= List of NFL players =

This article comprises lists of National Football League (NFL), American Football League (AFL), and All-America Football Conference (AAFC) players. (Note: The NFL began recognizing AAFC statistics in 2025.)

== By name ==
A • Ba–Boni • Bonn–By • Ca–Cline • Clink–Cz • D • E • F • G • Ha–Henn • Henr–Hy • I • J • K • L • Ma–McMul • McMur–My • N • O • P • Q • R • Sa–Sme • Smi–Sz • T • U–V • Wa–Wh • Wi–X • Y–Z

== By team ==
=== Current ===
- Arizona Cardinals all-time roster (A–Kin, Kir–Z)
- Atlanta Falcons all-time roster
- Baltimore Ravens all-time roster
- Buffalo Bills all-time roster
- Carolina Panthers all-time roster
- Chicago Bears all-time roster (A–K, L–Z)
- Cincinnati Bengals all-time roster
- Cleveland Browns all-time roster (A–J, K–Z)
- Dallas Cowboys all-time roster
- Denver Broncos all-time roster
- Detroit Lions all-time roster (A–Las, Lat–Z)
- Green Bay Packers all-time roster
- Houston Texans all-time roster
- Indianapolis Colts all-time roster (A–K, L–Z)
- Jacksonville Jaguars all-time roster
- Kansas City Chiefs all-time roster
- Las Vegas Raiders all-time roster
- Los Angeles Chargers all-time roster
- Los Angeles Rams all-time roster (A–Kin, Kir–Z)
- Miami Dolphins all-time roster
- Minnesota Vikings all-time roster
- New England Patriots all-time roster
- New Orleans Saints all-time roster
- New York Giants all-time roster (A–Kim, Kin–Z)
- New York Jets all-time roster (A–K, L–Z)
- Philadelphia Eagles all-time roster (A–Ke, Kh–Z)
- Pittsburgh Steelers all-time roster (A–K, L–Z)
- San Francisco 49ers all-time roster (A–K, L–Z)
- Seattle Seahawks all-time roster
- Tampa Bay Buccaneers all-time roster
- Tennessee Titans all-time roster
- Washington Commanders all-time roster (A–Ke, Kh–Z)

=== Defunct ===
- All-time rosters by defunct NFL franchises (Akron Indians/Pros–Cleveland Indians/Bulldogs, Cleveland Tigers/Indians–Miami Seahawks, Milwaukee Badgers–Washington Senators)
