= San Francisco 49ers all-time roster (L–Z) =

1,581 players have appeared in at least one regular season or postseason game in the National Football League (NFL) or All-America Football Conference (AAFC) for the San Francisco 49ers since 1946. This list includes those whose last names fall between "L" and "Z". For the rest of the players, see San Francisco 49ers all-time roster (A–K). This list is accurate through the end of the 2025 NFL season.

== L ==
- Matt LaBounty
- Travis LaBoy
- Bill LaFleur
- Roland Lakes
- Trey Lance
- Fred Land
- Mel Land
- Antonio Langham
- Dan LaRose
- Bill Larson
- Jim Lash
- Bud Laughlin
- Amos Lawrence
- Manny Lawson
- Steve Lawson
- Terry LeCount
- Dwayne Ledford
- Hal Ledyard
- Amp Lee
- Andy Lee
- Dwight Lee
- Elijah Lee
- Kevin Lee
- Mark Lee
- Tyrone Legette
- Ashley Lelie
- Corey Lemonier
- Deommodore Lenoir
- Jim Leonard
- Tony Leonard
- Brian Leonhardt
- Bobby Leopold
- Otis Leverette
- Chuck Levy
- Eddie Lewis
- Gary Lewis
- Jonas Lewis
- Keith Lewis
- Kevin Lewis
- Michael Lewis (born 1971)
- Michael Lewis (born 1980)
- Ron Lewis
- Kevin Lilly
- Verl Lillywhite
- Mike Lind
- Chris Lindstrom
- Don Lisbon
- Greg Liter
- Howie Livingston
- Brandon Lloyd
- J. W. Lockett
- Marc Logan
- Tim Long
- Jim Looney
- Joe Looney
- Bill Lopasky
- Ronnie Lott
- Derek Loville
- Alex Loyd
- Chase Lucas
- Corey Luciano
- Bobby Luna
- Darrell Luter
- Lenny Lyles
- Aaron Lynch
- Ben Lynch
- Anthony Lynn

== M ==
- Greg Mabin
- Ken MacAfee
- John Macaulay
- Alex Mack
- Marlon Mack
- Dee Mackey
- George Maderos
- Mike Magac
- Erik Magnuson
- Jaylen Mahoney
- Ned Maloney
- Jack Manley
- Charles Mann
- Mario Manningham
- Sean Manuel
- Chris Maragos
- Justin March
- Ken Margerum
- Cassius Marsh
- Rasheed Marshall
- Bob Martin
- Derrick Martin
- Jonathan Martin
- Keshawn Martin
- Marcus Martin
- Nick Martin
- Saladin Martin
- Tay Martin
- Adrian Martinez
- Len Masini
- Jordan Mason
- Lindsey Mason
- Riley Matheson
- Ned Mathews
- Al Matthews
- Clay Matthews, Sr.
- Jordan Matthews
- Marv Matuszak
- Andy Maurer
- Brett Maxie
- Jim Maxwell
- Marcus Maxwell
- Jared Mayden
- Taylor Mays
- Jason McAddley
- Ken McAlister
- Darcel McBath
- Christian McCaffrey
- Ed McCaffrey
- Max McCaffrey
- Jim McCann
- Nick McCloud
- Ray-Ray McCloud
- Dexter McCoil
- Milt McColl
- Dave McCormick
- Tom McCormick
- Walter McCormick
- Colt McCoy
- L. J. McCray
- Willie McCray
- George McCullough
- Tony McDaniel
- Kevin McDermott
- Ramos McDonald
- Ray McDonald
- Tim McDonald
- Vance McDonald
- Hugh McElhenny
- Leon McFadden
- Kay McFarland
- Willie McGee
- Ralph McGill
- T. Y. McGill
- Mike McGlinchey
- Reggie McGrew
- Mike McGruder
- Lamar McHan
- Don McIlhenny
- Guy McIntyre
- Jeff McIntyre
- Reggie McKenzie
- Scott McKillop
- Jerick McKinnon
- Colton McKivitz
- Bill McKoy
- Tim McKyer
- Chase McLaughlin
- Dana McLemore
- Wynton McManis
- Mark McMillian
- Clifton McNeil
- Jeremy McNichols
- R. W. McQuarters
- John Mellekas
- John Mellus
- Dan Melville
- Jerry Mertens
- Dale Messer
- Bob Meyers
- Art Michalik
- Willie Middlebrooks
- Bob Mike
- Steve Mike-Mayer
- Doug Mikolas
- John Milem
- Matt Millen
- Brit Miller
- Bruce Miller
- Clark Miller
- Hal Miller
- Jim Miller
- Johnny Miller
- Rod Milstead
- George Mira
- Rick Mirer
- Dale Mitchell
- Earl Mitchell
- Elijah Mitchell
- Kevin Mitchell
- Tom Mitchell
- Billy Mixon
- Dicky Moegle
- Ralf Mojsiejenko
- Bob Momsen
- Jim Monachino
- Wonder Monds
- Carl Monroe
- Joe Montana
- Blanchard Montgomery
- Monty Montgomery
- Jake Moody
- Nick Moody
- Brandon Moore
- Damontre Moore
- Dean Moore
- Gene Moore
- Jason Moore
- Jaylon Moore
- Jeff Moore
- Manfred Moore
- Marlon Moore
- Skyy Moore
- Tarvarius Moore
- Sean Moran
- Joe Morgan
- Josh Morgan
- Melvin Morgan
- Mike Moroski
- Earl Morrall
- Alfred Morris
- Darryl Morris
- Dennit Morris
- George Morris
- Dennis Morrison
- Thomas Morstead
- Dave Morton
- John Morton
- Johnnie Morton
- Frank Morze
- Emmanuel Moseley
- Drew Moss
- Randy Moss
- Raheem Mostert
- Gary Moten
- Howard Mudd
- Nick Mullens
- Louis Murphy
- Rob Murphy
- Bill Musgrave
- Malik Mustapha
- Chip Myers

== N ==
- Kai Nacua
- Hannibal Navies
- Randy Neal
- Siran Neal
- Joe Nedney
- Renaldo Nehemiah
- Bob Nelson
- Kyle Nelson
- Tom Neville
- Jeremy Newberry
- Craig Newsome
- Calvin Nicholas
- Mark Nichols
- Jack Nix
- Tory Nixon
- Leo Nomellini
- Hank Norberg
- Josh Norman
- Moran Norris
- Jim Norton
- Ken Norton Jr.
- Ray Norton
- Frank Nunley
- Mark Nzeocha

== O ==
- Bart Oates
- Jim Obradovich
- Ricky Odom
- Pat O'Donahue
- Pat O'Donnell
- George Odum
- Chike Okeafor
- Sam Okuayinonu
- Dave Olerich
- Isaiah Oliver
- Melvin Oliver
- Lance Olssen
- Charles Omenihu
- Brian O'Neal
- James Onwualu
- Tom Orosz
- Clancy Osborne
- Kassim Osgood
- Craig Osika
- Phil Ostrowski
- J. T. O'Sullivan
- Tom Owen
- James Owens
- R. C. Owens
- Terrell Owens

== P ==
- Jim Pace
- Lou Palatella
- Bubba Paris
- Anthony Parker
- Don Parker
- Dave Parks
- Limbo Parks
- James Parrish
- Tony Parrish
- Earle Parsons
- Tony Pashos
- Dennis Patera
- Chris Patrick
- Jacques Patrick
- Reno Patterson
- Quinton Patton
- Ricky Patton
- Logan Paulsen
- Charles Pavlich
- Erik Pears
- Ricky Pearsall
- Justin Peelle
- Brian Peets
- Bob Penchion
- Woody Peoples
- Taybor Pepper
- Joe Perry
- Scott Perry
- Mike Person
- Julian Peterson
- Todd Peterson
- Tony Peterson
- Will Peterson
- Dante Pettis
- Lawrence Phillips
- Mel Phillips
- Cody Pickett
- Lawrence Pillers
- Ed Pine
- Bradley Pinion
- Jason Pinnock
- Eddy Piñeiro
- Anthony Pleasant
- Austen Pleasants
- Ahmed Plummer
- Bruce Plummer
- Gary Plummer
- Jim Plunkett
- Owen Pochman
- Frank Pollack
- Darryl Pollard
- Bob Poole
- Marquez Pope
- Ted Popson
- Jeff Posey
- Charley Powell
- Tyvis Powell
- Jim Powers
- Roell Preston
- Daryl Price
- Pierson Prioleau
- Joe Prokop
- Matt Pryor
- Hal Puddy
- Craig Puki
- Dominick Puni
- Mike Purcell
- Brock Purdy
- Rollin Putzier

== Q ==
- Fred Quillan
- Chuck Quilter

== R ==
- Chilo Rachal
- Mike Raines
- Eason Ramson
- Sonny Randle
- Al Randolph
- Saleem Rasheed
- Rocky Rasley
- Tom Rathman
- Tim Rattay
- Kevin Reach
- Keith Reaser
- D. J. Reed
- Jeff Reed
- Joe Reed
- Jordan Reed
- Rayshun Reed
- Albert Reese
- Archie Reese
- Bill Reid
- Eric Reid
- Bill Remington
- Dick Renfro
- Jack Reynolds
- Bruce Rhodes
- Ray Rhodes
- Jerry Rice
- Kris Richard
- Mike Richardson
- Weston Richburg
- Wade Richey
- David Richie
- Hassan Ridgeway
- Elston Ridgle
- Jim Ridlon
- Preston Riley
- Bill Ring
- Steve Rivera
- Vern Roberson
- C. R. Roberts
- Larry Roberts
- Jamal Robertson
- Aldrick Robinson
- Brian Robinson Jr.
- Curtis Robinson
- Demarcus Robinson
- Jimmy Robinson
- Michael Robinson
- Rashard Robinson
- Trenton Robinson
- Ed Robnett
- Reggie Roby
- Walt Rock
- Del Rodgers
- Carlos Rogers
- Doug Rogers
- Len Rohde
- Mark Roman
- Bill Romanowski
- Ken Roskie
- Allen Rossum
- Karl Rubke
- Leo Rucka
- Joe Rudolph
- Chris Ruhman
- Mike Rumph
- Max Runager
- Damien Russell
- Logan Ryan
- Sean Ryan

== S ==
- Tino Sabuco
- Floyd Sagely
- Paul Salata
- Mike Salmon
- Deebo Samuel
- Garrison Sanborn
- Deion Sanders
- Emmanuel Sanders
- Bill Sandifer
- Dan Sandifer
- Mohamed Sanu
- Jesse Sapolu
- Tony Sardisco
- Al Satterfield
- Eric Saubert
- John Saunders
- Pete Schabarum
- John Schiechl
- John Schlecht
- Henry Schmidt
- Ricky Schmitt
- Larry Schreiber
- Lance Schulters
- Jim Schwantz
- Eric Scoggins
- Ben Scotti
- Kirk Scrafford
- Tom Seabron
- Paul Seal
- Richard Seigler
- Trey Sermon
- Wasswa Serwanga
- Bobby Setzer
- Ed Sharkey
- Charlie Shaw
- Josh Shaw
- Kendall Sheffield
- Todd Shell
- Jonathan Shelley
- JaCorey Shepherd
- Dakoda Shepley
- Trent Sherfield
- Stan Sheriff
- Richard Sherman
- Mike Sherrard
- Billy Shields
- Hal Shoener
- Mike Shumann
- Ron Shumon
- Chuck Sieminski
- Ricky Siglar
- Marques Sigle
- Sam Silas
- Ian Silberman
- Jerome Simpson
- Mike Simpson
- O. J. Simpson
- Barry Sims
- Nate Singleton
- Ron Singleton
- Emil Sitko
- Daryle Skaugstad
- Shayne Skov
- Buster Skrine
- Justin Skule
- Dan Skuta
- T. J. Slaughter
- Joey Slye
- DeAndre Smelter
- Fred Smerlas
- Justin Smiley
- Aldon Smith
- Alex Smith
- Alfonso Smith
- Artie Smith
- Charlie Smith
- Corey Smith
- Derek Smith
- Ernie Smith
- Frankie Smith
- George Smith
- Irv Smith Sr.
- J. D. Smith
- Jerry Smith
- Justin Smith
- Keith Smith
- Malcolm Smith
- Noland Smith
- Paul Smith
- Reggie Smith
- Saivion Smith
- Torrey Smith
- Trent Smith
- Troy Smith
- Norm Snead
- Willie Snead
- Jim Sniadecki
- Adam Snyder
- Freddie Solomon
- Gordy Soltau
- Isaac Sopoaga
- Dave Sparks
- Akeem Spence
- Julian Spence
- Shawntae Spencer
- Takeo Spikes
- C. J. Spillman
- Micheal Spurlock
- Steve Spurrier
- Bob St. Clair
- Joe Staley
- Norm Standlee
- Chad Stanley
- Matt Stanley
- Steve Stenstrom
- Jack Steptoe
- Mark Stevens
- Daleroy Stewart
- Quincy Stewart
- Monty Stickles
- Howard Stidham
- Bill Stits
- J. J. Stokes
- Tom Stolhandske
- Ron Stone
- Upton Stout
- Jeff Stover
- Rod Streater
- Kentavius Street
- Tai Streets
- Bishop Strickland
- Donald Strickland
- Frank Strong
- Jim Strong
- Vince Stroth
- Johnny Strzykalski
- Dana Stubblefield
- Danny Stubbs
- Jim Stuckey
- Nate Stupar
- Bob Sullivan
- John Sullivan
- Vinnie Sunseri
- Nick Susoeff
- Vinny Sutherland
- John Sutro
- Jason Suttle
- Brett Swain
- Justin Swift
- Tre Swilling
- Wayne Swinford
- Harry Sydney

== T ==
- Ralph Tamm
- Hamp Tanner
- Phillip Tanner
- Jaquiski Tartt
- Pita Taumoepenu
- Terry Tausch
- Terry Tautolo
- Bruce Taylor
- Curtis Taylor
- Jamar Taylor
- John Taylor
- Jullian Taylor
- Patrick Taylor
- Rosey Taylor
- Trent Taylor
- Tony Teresa
- John Theus
- Aaron Thomas
- Ambry Thomas
- Chase Thomas
- Chris Thomas
- Chuck Thomas
- Edward Thomas
- Jimmy Thomas
- John Thomas
- Lynn Thomas
- Mark Thomas
- Pierre Thomas
- Solomon Thomas
- Tommy Thompson
- Jeremy Thornburg
- Bruce Thornton
- Rupe Thornton
- Bruce Threadgill
- Billy Tidwell
- Andrew Tiller
- Spencer Tillman
- Ken Times
- Bob Titchenal
- Y. A. Tittle
- Levine Toilolo
- Laken Tomlinson
- Bob Toneff
- Jake Tonges
- Wayne Trimble
- Jerry Tubbs
- Winfred Tubbs
- B. J. Tucker
- Bill Tucker
- Manu Tuiasosopo
- Will Tukuafu
- Kemoko Turay
- Keena Turner
- Malik Turner
- Odessa Turner
- Wendell Tyler

== U ==
- Jeff Ulbrich
- Artie Ulmer
- Iheanyi Uwaezuoke

== V ==
- Marquez Valdes-Scantling
- Jeremiah Valoaga
- Skip Vanderbundt
- Bob Van Doren
- Mike Varajon
- Tommy Vardell
- Ruben Vaughan
- Ke'Shawn Vaughn
- Ted Vaught
- Raymond Ventrone
- Garin Veris
- Jason Verrett
- Joe Vetrano
- Ted Vincent
- George Visger
- Tristan Vizcaino
- Jim Vollenweider

== W ==
- Lowell Wagner
- Aaron Walker
- Adam Walker
- Darnell Walker
- Delanie Walker
- Elliott Walker
- Joe Walker
- Val Joe Walker
- Bev Wallace
- Cody Wallace
- Steve Wallace
- Garret Wallow
- Wesley Walls
- Austin Walter
- Michael Walter
- Charvarius Ward
- Jimmie Ward
- Kevin Ware
- Fred Warner
- Terrence Warren
- Dave Washington
- Gene Washington
- Marvin Washington
- Ted Washington
- Tim Washington
- Vic Washington
- Bob Waters
- Jordan Watkins
- Dekoda Watson
- John Watson
- Ricky Watters
- Dave Waymer
- Jed Weaver
- Jimmy Webb
- Jason Webster
- Ken Webster
- Jon Weeks
- Chris Weinke
- Mike Wells
- Ray Wells
- Ray Wersching
- Joe Wesley
- CJ West
- Robert West
- Brian Westbrook
- Bob White
- DaShaun White
- DeAndrew White
- Keion White
- Kevin White
- Brandon Whiting
- David Whitmore
- Donte Whitner
- Cole Wick
- Dave Wilcox
- Matt Wilhelm
- Michael Wilhoite
- David Wilkins
- Gabe Wilkins
- Jeff Wilkins
- Jerry Wilkinson
- Ken Willard
- Alfred Williams
- Andrew Williams
- Brandon Williams
- Chad Williams
- Darrell Williams Jr.
- Dave Williams
- Delvin Williams
- Gerard Williams
- Herb Williams
- Howie Williams
- Ian Williams
- James Williams (born 1967)
- James Williams (born 1968)
- Jamie Williams
- Jimmy Williams
- Joel Williams
- Johnny Williams
- Kevin Williams
- K'Waun Williams
- Kyle Williams
- Madieu Williams
- Melvin Williams
- Michael Williams
- Mykel Williams
- Newton Williams
- Renaud Williams
- Roy Williams
- Trent Williams
- Vince Williams
- Carlton Williamson
- Matt Willig
- Brayden Willis
- Jamal Willis
- Jordan Willis
- Patrick Willis
- Klaus Wilmsmeyer
- Billy Wilson
- Cedrick Wilson Sr.
- Jarrod Wilson
- Jeff Wilson
- Jerry Wilson
- Jim Wilson
- Karl Wilson
- Mike Wilson
- Tavon Wilson
- Troy Wilson
- Jamie Winborn
- Bob Windsor
- Lloyd Winston
- Dee Winters
- Mitch Wishnowsky
- Pete Wismann
- Dick Witcher
- Ahkello Witherspoon
- John Wittenborn
- Tom Wittum
- Charlie Woerner
- John Woitt
- Samuel Womack
- Bill Wondolowski
- Lee Woodall
- Don Woods
- Rashaun Woods
- Abe Woodson
- Rod Woodson
- John Woudenberg
- Tony Wragge
- Eric Wright (born 1959)
- Eric Wright (born 1985)
- Matthew Wright
- DeShawn Wynn

== Y ==
- Rock Ya-Sin
- Isaac Yiadom
- Wally Yonamine
- Bryant Young
- Charle Young
- Chase Young
- Sam Young
- Steve Young
- Sid Youngelman
- Walt Yowarsky

== Z ==
- Nick Zakelj
- Dominique Zeigler
- Joe Zelenka
- Tony Zendejas
- Anthony Zettel
