= List of NFL players (P) =

This is a list of players who have appeared in at least one regular season or postseason game in the National Football League (NFL), American Football League (AFL), or All-America Football Conference (AAFC) and have a last name that starts with "P". This list is accurate through the end of the 2025 NFL season.

== Pac–Par ==
- Calvin Pace
- Ivan Pace
- Jim Pace
- Orlando Pace
- Dave Pacella
- Vince Pacewic
- Chris Pacheco
- Isiah Pacheco
- Walter Packer
- Bob Padan
- Gary Padjen
- Max Padlow
- Stephen Paea
- Bob Paffrath
- Fred Pagac
- Jeoffrey Pagan
- Alan Page
- Chase Page
- Craig Page
- Eric Page
- Jarrad Page
- Paul Page
- Payton Page
- Solomon Page
- Derek Pagel
- Mike Pagel
- Joe Pagliei
- Louie Pahl
- Jeff Pahukoa
- Shane Pahukoa
- Lee Paige
- Stephone Paige
- Tony Paige
- Homer Paine
- Jeff Paine
- Carl Painter
- Curtis Painter
- Vinston Painter
- Glenn Pakulak
- Kache Palacio
- Michael Palardy
- Lou Palatella
- Lou Palazzi
- Alex Palczewski
- Lonnie Palelei
- Anton Palepoi
- Tenny Palepoi
- Jim Palermo
- Al Palewicz
- Tyler Palko
- Mike Palm
- Ashlee Palmer
- Carson Palmer
- Chuck Palmer
- David Palmer
- Derrell Palmer
- Dick Palmer
- Emile Palmer
- Gery Palmer
- Jesse Palmer
- Jordan Palmer
- Josh Palmer
- Les Palmer
- Michael Palmer
- Mike Palmer
- Mitch Palmer
- Nate Palmer
- Nathan Palmer
- Paul Palmer
- Randy Palmer
- Scott Palmer
- Sterling Palmer
- Tejhaun Palmer
- Tobais Palmer
- Tom Palmer
- Tony Palmer
- Trey Palmer
- Walter Palmore
- John Paluck
- Sam Palumbo
- Kevin Pamphile
- Tony Panaccion
- Don Panciera
- Chris Pane
- John Panelli
- Mike Panepinto
- Ken Panfil
- Hal Pangle
- Adam Pankey
- Irv Pankey
- Ernie Pannell
- Joe Panos
- Chris Pantale
- Ben Paolucci
- Nick Papac
- George Papach
- Vince Papale
- Oran Pape
- John Papit
- Joe Pappio
- Owen Pappoe
- Matt Paradis
- Jack Pardee
- Paul Pardonner
- Curt Pardridge
- Bob Paremore
- Donald Parham
- Dylan Parham
- Babe Parilli
- Bubba Paris
- Don Parish
- Jacob Parrish
- Ernie Park
- Kaulana Park
- Aaron Parker
- Ace Parker
- A. J. Parker
- Andy Parker
- Anthony Parker (born 1966)
- Anthony Parker (born 1975)
- Artimus Parker
- Brandon Parker
- Brian Parker
- Buddy Parker
- Carl Parker
- Charlie Parker
- Chris Parker
- Daren Parker
- Dave Parker
- De'Mond Parker
- DeVante Parker
- Don Parker
- Eric Parker
- Ervin Parker
- Frank Parker
- Freddie Parker
- Glenn Parker
- Howie Parker
- Jeff Parker
- Jeremiah Parker
- Jerry Parker
- Jim Parker
- Joe Parker
- Joel Parker
- Juqua Parker
- J'Vonne Parker
- Kenny Parker
- Kerry Parker
- Larry Parker
- Orlando Parker
- Preston Parker
- Ricky Parker
- Riddick Parker
- Robert Parker
- Rodney Parker
- Ron Parker
- Samie Parker
- Sirr Parker
- Steve Parker (born 1956)
- Steve Parker (born 1959)
- Steven Parker
- Vaughn Parker
- Willie Parker (born 1945)
- Willie Parker (born 1948)
- Willie Parker (born 1980)
- Cody Parkey
- Dave Parkin
- Colby Parkinson
- Doc Parkinson
- Billy Parks
- Cord Parks
- Dave Parks
- Jeff Parks
- Limbo Parks
- Mickey Parks
- Nathan Parks
- Rickey Parks
- Terrance Parks
- Tommy Parks
- Will Parks
- Chet Parlavecchio
- Bernie Parmalee
- Jalen Parmele
- Jim Parmer
- Babe Parnell
- Jermey Parnell
- Jeremy Parquet
- John Parrella
- Bill Parriott
- Gary Parris
- Timon Parris
- Bernie Parrish
- Don Parrish
- James Parrish
- Lemar Parrish
- Roscoe Parrish
- Tony Parrish
- Rick Parros
- David Parry
- Josh Parry
- Ox Parry
- Ara Parseghian
- Cliff Parsley
- Ray Parson
- Rich Parson
- Alex Parsons
- Bob Parsons
- Earle Parsons
- Lloyd Parsons
- Micah Parsons
- Dennis Partee
- Ty Parten
- Lou Partlow
- Rick Partridge

== Pas–Pen ==
- Zach Pascal
- Bill Paschal
- Doug Paschal
- Josh Paschal
- Marcus Paschal
- Gordon Paschka
- Bear Pascoe
- Bill Pashe
- Tony Pashos
- Keith Paskett
- George Paskvan
- Joe Pasqua
- Ron Pasquale
- Ralph Pasquariello
- Tony Pasquesi
- Patrick Pass
- Bill Passuelo
- Frank Pastin
- Dan Pastorini
- Alan Pastrana
- Austin Pasztor
- Mike Patanelli
- Lloyd Pate
- Rupert Pate
- Dennis Patera
- Jack Patera
- Greg Paterra
- Herb Paterra
- Jerome Pathon
- DeWayne Patmon
- Dezmon Patmon
- Tyler Patmon
- Aaron Patrick
- Ben Patrick
- Chris Patrick
- Frank Patrick (born 1915)
- Frank Patrick (born 1947)
- Garin Patrick
- Jacques Patrick
- John Patrick
- Johnny Patrick
- Lucas Patrick
- Mike Patrick
- Natrez Patrick
- Tim Patrick
- Wayne Patrick
- Maury Patt
- David Patten
- Joel Patten
- Patterson
- Billy Patterson
- Clete Patterson
- Cordarrelle Patterson
- Craig Patterson
- Dimitri Patterson
- Don Patterson
- Elton Patterson
- Elvis Patterson
- Eric Patterson
- Gordon Patterson
- Jaret Patterson
- Jarrett Patterson
- Javon Patterson
- Mike Patterson
- Paul Patterson
- Reno Patterson
- Riley Patterson
- Shawn Patterson
- Darrell Pattillo
- Mark Pattison
- Andre Patton
- Bob Patton
- Cliff Patton
- James Patton
- Jerry Patton
- Jimmy Patton
- Joe Patton
- Marvcus Patton
- Quinton Patton
- Ricky Patton
- Robert Patton
- Solomon Patton
- Walt Patulski
- Chris Paul
- Don Paul
- Don Paul
- Harold Paul
- Markus Paul
- Niles Paul
- Patrick Paul
- Tito Paul
- Whitney Paul
- Tony Paulekas
- Sam Paulescu
- Jeff Paulk
- Logan Paulsen
- Dainard Paulson
- David Paulson
- Frank Pauly
- Bryce Paup
- Ted Pavelec
- Stan Pavkov
- Charles Pavlich
- Joe Pawelek
- Scott Paxson
- Lonie Paxton
- Kwity Paye
- Karl Paymah
- Charlie Payne
- Daron Payne
- Donald Payne
- Ken Payne
- Kevin Payne
- Logan Payne
- Rod Payne
- Russell Payne
- Seth Payne
- Spencer Paysinger
- Eddie Payton
- Jarrett Payton
- Jordan Payton
- Rico Payton
- Sean Payton
- Walter Payton
- Dwight Peabody
- Chris Peace
- Larry Peace
- Elvis Peacock
- Johnny Peacock
- Isaiah Pead
- Charone Peake
- Clarence Peaks
- Dave Pear
- Harley Pearce
- James Pearce Jr.
- Pard Pearce
- Jim Pearcy
- Red Pearlman
- Alvin Pearman
- Erik Pears
- Morgan Pears
- Ricky Pearsall
- Aaron Pearson
- Barry Pearson
- Bert Pearson
- Dave Pearson
- Dennis Pearson
- Drew Pearson
- Dudley Pearson
- Henry Pearson
- J. C. Pearson
- Kalvin Pearson
- Lindy Pearson
- Mike Pearson
- Preston Pearson
- Willie Pearson
- Matt Peart
- Brent Pease
- George Pease
- Andrus Peat
- Todd Peat
- Jack Peavey
- Francis Peay
- Jared Peck
- Win Pedersen
- Doug Pederson
- Jim Pederson
- Josh Pederson
- Aeneas Peebles
- Danny Peebles
- Jim Peebles
- Art Peed
- Antwan Peek
- Justin Peelle
- Cedric Peerman
- Gordon Peery
- Rodney Peete
- Brian Peets
- Jayden Peevy
- Erric Pegram
- JJ Pegues
- Willis Peguese
- Dan Peiffer
- Domata Peko
- Kyle Peko
- Tupe Peko
- Doug Pelfrey
- Ray Pelfrey
- Bob Pellegrini
- Joe Pellegrini (born 1956)
- Joe Pellegrini (born 1957)
- Micah Pellerin
- Bill Pellington
- Scott Pelluer
- Steve Pelluer
- Claude Pelon
- Troy Pelshak
- Bubba Pena
- Jairo Penaranda
- Bob Penchion
- David Pender
- Jeris Pendleton
- John Penisini
- Michael Penix
- Chris Penn
- Donald Penn
- Jesse Penn
- Mike Pennel
- Trevor Penning
- Chad Pennington
- Leon Pennington
- Terrance Pennington
- Tom Pennington
- Jay Pennison
- Elijhaa Penny
- Rashaad Penny
- Carlos Pennywell
- Robert Pennywell
- Craig Penrose
- Leon Pense
- John Pentecost

== Peo–Pf ==
- George Peoples
- Woody Peoples
- Donovan Peoples-Jones
- Pepper
- Gene Pepper
- Taybor Pepper
- Jabrill Peppers
- Julius Peppers
- Charlie Peprah
- Frank Perantoni
- Mac Percival
- Bolo Perdue
- Pete Perez
- John Pergine
- Justin Perillo
- Bob Perina
- La'Mical Perine
- Samaje Perine
- Pete Perini
- Antonio Perkins
- Art Perkins
- Bill Perkins
- Bruce Perkins
- Bryce Perkins
- Don Perkins
- Don Perkins
- Horace Perkins
- Jim Perkins
- Johnny Perkins
- Joshua Perkins
- Kent Perkins
- Paul Perkins
- Ray Perkins (born 1941)
- Ray Perkins (born 1964)
- Ronnie Perkins
- Willis Perkins
- John Perko (born 1914)
- John Perko (born 1918)
- Mike Perko
- Tom Perko
- Phil Perlo
- Petey Perot
- George Perpich
- Pete Perreault
- Ralph Perretta
- Mike Perrie
- Breshad Perriman
- Brett Perriman
- Benny Perrin
- John Perrin
- Lonnie Perrin
- Mike Perrino
- Mike Perrotti
- A. T. Perry
- Bruce Perry
- Chris Perry
- Claude Perry
- Darren Perry
- Ed Perry
- Gerald Perry
- Gerry Perry
- Jamal Perry
- Jason Perry
- Jereme Perry
- Joe Perry
- Joshua Perry
- Leon Perry
- Lowell Perry
- Malcolm Perry
- Mario Perry
- Marlo Perry
- Michael Dean Perry
- Nick Perry
- Rod Perry
- Roderick Perry II
- Scott Perry
- Senorise Perry
- Tab Perry
- Todd Perry
- Vernon Perry
- Victor Perry
- William Perry
- Wilmont Perry
- Bob Perryman
- Dean Perryman
- Denzel Perryman
- Jim Perryman
- Ray Perryman
- Ara Person
- Mike Person
- Dick Pesonen
- Louie Pessolano
- Wally Pesuit
- John Petchel
- Boni Petcoff
- Lawrence Pete
- Christian Peter
- Jason Peter
- Nathan Peterman
- Stephen Peterman
- Anton Peters
- Brian Peters
- Corey Peters
- Floyd Peters
- Frank Peters
- Frosty Peters
- Jason Peters
- Marcus Peters
- Otha Peters
- Scott Peters
- Tony Peters
- Tyrell Peters
- Volney Peters
- Ike Petersen
- Ken Petersen
- Kurt Petersen
- Ted Petersen
- Brett Petersmark
- Adrian Peterson (born 1979)
- Adrian Peterson (born 1985)
- Andrew Peterson
- Ben Peterson
- Bill Peterson
- Cal Peterson
- Carl Peterson
- Greg Peterson
- Jerry Peterson
- Jim Peterson
- Joe Peterson
- Julian Peterson
- Kenny Peterson
- Kevin Peterson
- Les Peterson
- Mike Peterson
- Nelson Peterson
- Patrick Peterson
- Phil Peterson
- Ray Peterson
- Russ Peterson
- Todd Peterson
- Tony Peterson
- Will Peterson
- Nicholas Petit-Frere
- Johnny Petitbon
- Richie Petitbon
- Luke Petitgout
- Rob Petitti
- Leo Petree
- Bob Petrella
- Pepper Petrella
- Bob Petrich
- Bill Petrilas
- Steve Petro
- George Petrovich
- Jamie Petrowski
- Mitch Petrus
- Stan Petry
- Phil Pettey
- Neal Petties
- Brandon Pettigrew
- Gary Pettigrew
- Austin Pettis
- Dante Pettis
- Duane Pettitt
- Aaron Pettrey
- Dell Pettus
- Kenneth Pettway
- Bryce Petty
- John Petty
- Larry Petty
- Ross Petty
- Barry Pettyjohn
- David Petway
- Bob Peviani
- Leo Peyton
- Bob Pfohl

== Ph–Pi ==
- Art Pharmer
- Jeremiah Pharms
- Tommy Pharr
- Bob Phelan
- Don Phelps
- Leroy Phelps
- Perry Phenix
- Roman Phifer
- Gerry Philbin
- Todd Philcox
- Ed Philion
- Kyle Philips
- Adrian Phillips
- Andru Phillips
- Anthony Phillips
- Anwar Phillips
- Bobby Phillips
- Cam Phillips
- Carroll Phillips
- Charlie Phillips
- Clark Phillips III
- Darius Phillips
- Dashaun Phillips
- Del'Shawn Phillips
- Ewell Phillips
- George Phillips
- Harrison Phillips
- Irvin Phillips
- Jacob Phillips
- Jaelan Phillips
- Jason Phillips (born 1966)
- Jason Phillips (born 1986)
- Jermaine Phillips
- Jess Phillips
- Joe Phillips (born May 12, 1963)
- Joe Phillips (born July 15, 1963)
- John Phillips
- Jordan Phillips (born 1992)
- Jordan Phillips (born 2004)
- Justin Phillips
- Kenny Phillips
- Kim Phillips
- Kirk Phillips
- Kyle Phillips
- Lawrence Phillips
- Loyd Phillips
- Mel Phillips
- Mike Phillips
- Randy Phillips
- Ray Phillips (born 1954)
- Ray Phillips (born 1964)
- Red Phillips
- Reggie Phillips
- Rod Phillips
- Ryan Phillips
- Scottie Phillips
- Shaun Phillips
- Tyre Phillips
- Wes Phillips
- Darius Philon
- Dean Philpott
- Ed Philpott
- Charles Philyaw
- Dino Philyaw
- Mareno Philyaw
- Mike Phipps
- Zack Pianalto
- Al Piasecky
- Bob Picard
- Bill Piccolo
- Brian Piccolo
- Lou Piccone
- Bob Pickard
- Bill Pickel
- Bob Pickens
- Bruce Pickens
- Carl Pickens
- George Pickens
- Lyle Pickens
- Zacch Pickens
- Clay Pickering
- Cody Pickett
- Kenny Pickett
- Ryan Pickett
- Tim Pidgeon
- Mike Piel
- Milt Piepul
- Aaron Pierce
- Alec Pierce
- Antonio Pierce
- Artavis Pierce
- Bernard Pierce
- Brett Pierce
- Dameon Pierce
- Danny Pierce
- Dick Pierce
- Don Pierce
- Michael Pierce
- Steve Pierce
- Terry Pierce
- Damon Pieri
- Al Pierotti
- James Pierre
- Joe Pierre
- Olsen Pierre
- Kevin Pierre-Louis
- Jason Pierre-Paul
- Ross Pierschbacher
- Pete Pierson
- Reggie Pierson
- Shurron Pierson
- Nick Pietrosante
- Jim Pietrzak
- Bob Pifferini
- Bob Pifferini, Sr.
- Bert Piggott
- Carl Pignatelli
- Pete Pihos
- Chris Pike
- Mark Pike
- Tony Pike
- Kealoha Pilares
- Joe Pilconis
- Willie Pile
- Evan Pilgrim
- Brandon Pili
- Roger Pillath
- Zach Piller
- Lawrence Pillers
- Brian Pillman
- Frank Pillow
- Ernie Pinckert
- Stan Pincura
- Cyril Pinder
- Ed Pine
- Eddy Piñeiro
- John Pingel
- Bradley Pinion
- Larry Pinkard
- Allen Pinkett
- Eric Pinkins
- Cleveland Pinkney
- Jared Pinkney
- Lovell Pinkney
- Reggie Pinkney
- Jason Pinkston
- Todd Pinkston
- Artose Pinner
- Ray Pinney
- Andrew Pinnock
- Jason Pinnock
- Danny Pinter
- Scott Piper
- Joyce Pipkin
- Lenzy Pipkins
- Trey Pipkins
- Jerrell Pippens
- Woodie Pippens
- Hank Piro
- Rocco Pirro
- Joe Pisarcik
- Steve Pisarkiewicz
- Sabby Piscitelli
- Roman Piskor
- Chuck Pitcock
- Quinn Pitcock
- Ropati Pitoitua
- Jalen Pitre
- Dennis Pitta
- Anthony Pittman
- Antonio Pittman
- Bryan Pittman
- Charlie Pittman
- Danny Pittman
- David Pittman
- Jamiyus Pittman
- Julian Pittman
- Kavika Pittman
- Michael Pittman
- Michael Pittman Jr.
- Ralph Pittman
- Swede Pittman
- Alabama Pitts
- Chester Pitts
- Derrek Pitts
- Elijah Pitts
- Frank Pitts
- Hugh Pitts
- John Pitts
- Kyle Pitts
- Lafayette Pitts
- Mike Pitts
- Ron Pitts
- Joe Pivarnik
- Dave Pivec

== Pl–Po ==
- Ryan Plackemeier
- Joe Planansky
- Doug Plank
- Earl Plank
- Tony Plansky
- Ron Plantz
- Jerry Planutis
- Dick Plasman
- George Platukis
- Scott Player
- Anthony Pleasant
- Eddie Pleasant
- Marquis Pleasant
- Mike Pleasant
- Reggie Pleasant
- Austen Pleasants
- Joe Pliska
- Kurt Ploeger
- Milt Plum
- Ahmed Plummer
- Bruce Plummer
- Chad Plummer
- Gary Plummer
- Jake Plummer
- Terrance Plummer
- Tony Plummer
- Dave Plump
- Ted Plumridge
- Art Plunkett
- Jim Plunkett
- Joseph Plunkett
- Sherman Plunkett
- Warren Plunkett
- Bobby Ply
- Ray Poage
- Owen Pochman
- Jason Pociask
- Ethan Pocic
- Adam Podlesh
- Paul Podmajersky
- Ed Podolak
- Jim Podoley
- Billy Poe
- Dontari Poe
- Johnnie Poe
- John Pohlman
- Dick Poillon
- Lance Poimbeouf
- Anthony Poindexter
- John Pointer
- Quinton Pointer
- Frank Pokorny
- Isaiah Pola-Mao
- Troy Polamalu
- John Polanski
- Esa Pole
- Quentin Poling
- Bull Polisky
- Jachai Polite
- Lousaka Polite
- Tony Poljan
- Carlos Polk
- Chris Polk
- DaShon Polk
- Ja'Lynn Polk
- David Pollack
- Frank Pollack
- Mike Pollak
- Al Pollard
- Bernard Pollard
- Bob Pollard
- Darryl Pollard
- Frank Pollard
- Fritz Pollard
- Marcus Pollard
- Robert Pollard
- Tony Pollard
- Trent Pollard
- Tom Polley
- Tommy Polley
- Red Pollock
- Gordon Polofsky
- Larry Polowski
- Fran Polsfoot
- Randy Poltl
- Tyler Polumbus
- Christian Ponder
- David Ponder
- Elijah Ponder
- Willie Ponder
- Antwaune Ponds
- Ryan Pontbriand
- Brodney Pool
- David Pool
- Hamp Pool
- Barney Poole
- Bob Poole
- Brian Poole
- Jim Poole
- Keith Poole
- Ken Poole
- Larry Poole
- Nate Poole
- Nathan Poole
- Ollie Poole
- Ray Poole
- Shelley Poole
- Steve Poole
- Tauren Poole
- Tyrone Poole
- Will Poole
- Eli Popa
- Bucky Pope
- Daniel Pope
- Derrick Pope
- Geoff Pope
- Ken Pope
- Kendyll Pope
- Leonard Pope
- Lew Pope
- Marquez Pope
- Monsanto Pope
- P. J. Pope
- Spencer Pope
- Troymaine Pope
- John Popovich
- Milt Popovich
- Brady Poppinga
- Ted Popson
- Robert Porcher
- Tom Porell
- Chris Port
- Alvin Porter
- Darien Porter
- Daryl Porter
- Daryl Porter Jr.
- Jack Porter
- Jerry Porter
- Joe Porter
- Joey Porter
- Joey Porter Jr.
- Kerry Porter
- Kevin Porter
- Lew Porter
- Quinn Porter
- Reggie Porter
- Ricky Porter
- Rob Porter
- Ron Porter
- Rufus Porter
- Sean Porter
- Tracy Porter (born 1959)
- Tracy Porter (born 1986)
- Willie Porter
- Garry Porterfield
- Jose Portilla
- Clinton Portis
- Marico Portis
- David Posey
- DeVier Posey
- Jeff Posey
- Julian Posey
- Paul Posluszny
- Bobby Post
- Dickie Post
- Al Postus
- Hank Poteat
- Phil Poth
- John Poto
- Benning Potoa'e
- Earl Potteiger
- John Potter
- Kevin Potter
- Nate Potter
- Steve Potter
- Zach Potter
- Myron Pottios
- Bill Potts
- Charlie Potts
- Daddy Potts
- Roosevelt Potts
- Ernest Pough
- Sione Po'uha
- Maurkice Pouncey
- Mike Pouncey
- Darryl Pounds
- Shar Pourdanesh
- Jeremiah Poutasi
- Darius Powe
- Jerrell Powe
- Karl Powe
- Keith Powe
- Alvin Powell
- Andre Powell
- Art Powell
- Bilal Powell
- Brandon Powell
- Carl Powell
- Carlton Powell
- Charley Powell
- Cornell Powell
- Craig Powell
- Darnell Powell
- Dick Powell
- Eric Powell
- Jeff Powell
- Jemeel Powell
- Jesse Powell
- Marvin Powell (born 1955)
- Marvin Powell (born 1976)
- Preston Powell
- Roger Powell
- Ronald Powell
- Ronnie Powell
- Shawn Powell
- Stan Powell
- Steve Powell
- Tim Powell
- Ty Powell
- Tyvis Powell
- Walt Powell
- William Powell
- Ben Powers
- Clyde Powers
- Jerraud Powers
- Jim Powers
- John Powers
- Ricky Powers
- Sammy Powers
- Warren Powers (born 1965)
- Warren Powers (born 1942)
- Jackson Powers-Johnson
- Jordan Poyer
- Phil Pozderac

== Pr–Py ==
- Dean Prater
- Matt Prater
- Shaun Prater
- Dale Prather
- Guy Prather
- Germaine Pratt
- Paul Pratt
- Robert Pratt
- John Prchlik
- George Preas
- Gene Prebola
- Steve Preece
- Merv Pregulman
- Adam Prentice
- Travis Prentice
- Dak Prescott
- Hal Prescott
- Andre President
- Gimel President
- Brennan Presley
- De'Andre Presley
- Leo Presley
- Glenn Presnell
- Chris Pressley
- DeMario Pressley
- Jim Prestel
- Bill Preston
- Dave Preston
- Duke Preston
- John Preston
- Michael Preston
- Pat Preston
- Ray Preston
- Roell Preston
- Luke Prestridge
- Felto Prewitt
- Bill Priatko
- Art Price
- Billy Price
- Bobby Price
- Brian Price (born 1989)
- Brian Price (born 1994)
- Cotton Price
- Daryl Price
- Dennis Price
- Derek Price
- D'Vonte Price
- Eddie Price
- Ejuan Price
- Elex Price
- Ernie Price
- Givens Price
- Jabari Price
- Jim Price (born 1966)
- Jim Price (born 1940)
- Kenny Price
- Marcus Price
- Mitchell Price
- Myles Price
- Peerless Price
- Ricky Price
- Sammy Price
- Shawn Price
- Sheldon Price
- Stacy Price
- Taylor Price
- Terry Price
- Billy Pricer
- Dan Pride
- Troy Pride Jr.
- Tom Pridemore
- Bob Priestley
- Frank Primeau
- Greg Primus
- James Primus
- Deantre Prince
- Deneric Prince
- Isaiah Prince
- Ryan Prince
- Dom Principe
- Mike Prindle
- Alan Pringle
- Byron Pringle
- Mike Pringle
- Mike Pringley
- Bob Print
- Pierson Prioleau
- Anthony Prior
- Mike Prior
- Errol Prisby
- Nick Prisco
- Bill Pritchard
- Bosh Pritchard
- Mike Pritchard
- Ron Pritchard
- Billy Pritchett
- Kelvin Pritchett
- Nehemiah Pritchett
- Stanley Pritchett
- Wes Pritchett
- Steve Pritko
- Bryan Proby
- Ray Prochaska
- James Proche
- Cory Procter
- Dewey Proctor
- Rex Proctor
- Ricky Proehl
- Gene Profit
- Joe Profit
- Eddie Prokop
- Joe Prokop (born 1921)
- Joe Prokop (born 1960)
- Vince Promuto
- Jay Prosch
- Chris Prosinski
- C. J. Prosise
- Jack Protz
- Bob Prout
- Andrew Provence
- Ken Provencial
- Fred Provo
- Ted Provost
- Ronnie Prude
- Remi Prudhomme
- Perry Pruett
- Etric Pruitt
- Greg Pruitt
- James Pruitt
- Julius Pruitt
- Mickey Pruitt
- Mike Pruitt
- MyCole Pruitt
- Trevor Pryce
- Barry Pryor
- Calvin Pryor
- Joshua Pryor
- Kendric Pryor
- Matt Pryor
- Myron Pryor
- Terrelle Pryor
- Jim Psaltis
- Bob Ptacek
- Ben Pucci
- Mike Pucillo
- Hal Puddy
- Chet Pudloski
- Garry Puetz
- David Pugh
- Jethro Pugh
- Jordan Pugh
- Justin Pugh
- Marion Pugh
- Jarrod Pughsley
- Craig Puki
- Hayes Pullard
- Spencer Pulley
- Don Pumphrey
- Dominick Puni
- Andy Puplis
- Alfred Pupunu
- Mike Purcell
- Cal Purdin
- Tanner Purdum
- Brock Purdy
- Mike Purdy
- Pid Purdy
- Dave Pureifory
- Loucheiz Purifoy
- Maurice Purify
- Dave Purling
- Frank Purnell
- Jim Purnell
- Lovett Purnell
- Andre Purvis
- Ryan Purvis
- Vic Purvis
- Earl Putman
- Duane Putnam
- Will Putnam
- Fred Putzier
- Jeb Putzier
- Rollin Putzier
- Dave Puzzuoli
- Brad Pyatt
- Jack Pyburn
- Johnny Pyeatt
- Mike Pyle
- Palmer Pyle
- David Pyles
- Bob Pylman
- Jim Pyne
- George Pyne II
- George Pyne III
