= Indianapolis Colts all-time roster (L–Z) =

1,572 players have appeared in at least one regular season or postseason game in the National Football League (NFL) for the Indianapolis Colts franchise since 1953. This list includes those whose last names fall between "L" and "Z". For the rest of the players, see Indianapolis Colts all-time roster (A–K). This list is accurate through the end of the 2025 NFL season.

== L ==
- Mike Labinjo
- Ryan LaCasse
- Jacob Lacey
- Greg LaFleur
- Bruce Laird
- Chris Lammons
- Isaiah Land
- Greg Landry
- LaRon Landry
- Bob Langas
- Bill Lange
- Kendall Langford
- Reggie Langhorne
- Ron LaPointe
- Kurt Larson
- Lynn Larson
- Bill Laskey
- Brian Lattimore
- Laiatu Latu
- Luke Lawton
- Roosevelt Leaks
- Bob Leberman
- David Lee
- Keith Lee
- Monte Lee
- Ron Lee
- Jay Leeuwenburg
- Joe Lefeged
- Jeff Leiding
- Brian Leigeb
- Matt Lengel
- Riley Leonard
- Shaquille Leonard
- Jimmy Lesane
- Keith Lester
- Hal Lewis (1935)
- Joe Lewis
- Ryan Lewis
- Tyquan Lewis
- Ryan Lilja
- Ryan Lindley
- Phillip Lindsay
- Toni Linhart
- Jeff Linkenbach
- Jack Linn
- Aubrey Linne
- Gene Lipscomb
- Jack Little
- J. W. Lockett
- Jerry Logan
- David Long
- Joe Don Looney
- Tom Lopienski
- Tony Lorick
- Lance Louis
- Kirk Lowdermilk
- Dwight Lowery
- Orlando Lowry
- Jordan Lucas
- Derrel Luce
- Andrew Luck
- Mike Lush
- Scott Lutrus
- Lenny Lyles
- Corey Lynch

== M ==
- Marlon Mack
- Dee Mackey
- John Mackey
- David Macklin
- Tom MacLeod
- Anthony Madison
- Atonio Mafi
- Curt Maggitt
- Ryan Mahaffey
- Eric Mahlum
- Jack Maitland
- Don Majkowski
- Josh Mallard
- Will Mallory
- Tony Mandarich
- Peyton Manning
- Tim Manoa
- Butch Maples
- Gino Marchetti
- Cassius Marsh
- Greg Marshall
- Jacob Martin
- Jim Martin
- Robbie Martin
- Ronald Martin
- Sammy Martin
- Steve Martin
- Lindsey Mason
- Jason Mathews
- Ricardo Mathews
- Dedric Mathis
- Robert Mathis
- Trevor Matich
- Tom Matte
- Ron Mattes
- Frank Mattiace
- Marv Matuszak
- Carl Mauck
- Arthur Maulet
- Tommy Maxwell
- Vernon Maxwell
- Ray May
- Ron Mayo
- Joey Mbu
- Pat McAfee
- Reese McCall
- Don McCauley
- Jacques McClendon
- Skip McClendon
- Dave McCloughan
- Tony McCoy
- Emmanuel McDaniel
- Devon McDonald
- Dewey McDonald
- Quintus McDonald
- Kevin McDougal
- Ray McElroy
- Booger McFarland
- T. Y. McGill
- Mike McGlynn
- Keli McGregor
- Cameron McGrone
- Kaipo McGuire
- Lamar McHan
- Isaiah McKenzie
- Sean McKeon
- Steve McKinney
- Chase McLaughlin
- Chris McLemore
- Thomas McLemore
- Rodney McLeod
- Chuck McMillan
- Randy McMillan
- Sean McNanie
- Josh McNary
- Mike McNeill
- Jeremy McNichols
- Buck McPhail
- Dan McQuaid
- Adam Meadows
- Rashaan Melvin
- Dale Memmelaar
- Ken Mendenhall
- Jamon Meredith
- Jim Merritts
- Bo Metcalf
- Jack Mewhort
- Christine Michael
- Lou Michaels
- Arnold Mickens
- Frank Middleton
- Steve Mike-Mayer
- Jack Mildren
- Chuckie Miller
- Dan Miller
- Eddie Miller
- Fred Miller
- Kyle Miller
- Rolan Milligan
- Jim Mills
- Christopher Milton
- Barkevious Mingo
- Gardner Minshew
- Ed Mioduszewski
- Paul Miranda
- Adonai Mitchell
- Cameron Mitchell
- Lydell Mitchell
- Mike Mitchell
- Tom Mitchell
- Fili Moala
- Donte Moncrief
- D. J. Montgomery
- Monty Montgomery
- Ed Mooney
- Alvin Moore
- Corey Moore
- Devin Moore
- Henry Moore
- Jimmy Moore
- Kenneth Moore
- Kenny Moore II
- Larry Moore
- Lenny Moore
- Mewelde Moore
- Sio Moore
- Skai Moore
- Aaron Moorehead
- DaJuan Morgan
- Stanley Morgan
- Earl Morrall
- Darryl Morris
- Rob Morris
- Antonio Morrison
- Don Morrison
- Steve Morrison
- Jimmy Morrissey
- Mike Morton
- John Mosier
- Roland Moss
- Zack Moss
- Zefross Moss
- Adrian Moten
- Deiontrez Mount
- Bob Mrosko
- Henoc Muamba
- Al-Quadin Muhammad
- Mustafah Muhammad
- Daniel Muir
- Chad Muma
- Lloyd Mumphord
- James Mungro
- Nelson Munsey
- Rob Murphy
- Dan Murray
- Walter Murray
- Greg Murtha
- Jim Mutscheller
- Bob Myers
- Steve Myhra
- Tom Myslinski

== N ==
- Browning Nagle
- Eric Naposki
- Durell Nchami
- Dan Neal
- Leon Neal
- Andy Nelson
- Dennis Nelson
- Jim Nelson
- Kyle Nelson
- Quenton Nelson
- Doug Nettles
- Drake Nevis
- Billy Newsome
- Jonathan Newsome
- Jim Newton
- Mike Newton
- Yannick Ngakoue
- Ricky Nichols
- Robbie Nichols
- Hakeem Nicks
- Xavier Nixon
- James Noble
- Al Noga
- Don Nottingham
- Ken Novak
- Tom Nowatzke
- Terry Nugent
- Freddie Joe Nunn
- Buzz Nutter
- Chukie Nwokorie
- Dick Nyers

== O ==
- Victor Oatis
- Jim O'Brien
- Stu O'Dell
- Ifeadi Odenigbo
- Dayo Odeyingbo
- Cliff Odom
- George Odum
- Andrew Ogletree
- Quinn Ojinnaka
- Bobby Okereke
- Earl Okine
- Ray Oldham
- Bill Olds
- Bobby Olive
- Hubie Oliver
- Hans Olsen
- Seth Olsen
- Segun Olubi
- Calvin O'Neal
- Robert O'Neal
- Keith O'Neil
- Bob Ontko
- Joe Orduna
- Dan Orlovsky
- Jimmy Orr
- Herb Orvis
- Dwayne O'Steen
- Matt Overton
- Coleman Owen
- Luke Owens
- R. C. Owens
- Mike Ozdowski

== P ==
- Gary Padjen
- Mike Pagel
- Curtis Painter
- Nathan Palmer
- Irv Pankey
- Bubba Paris
- Anthony Parker
- Jim Parker
- Steve Parker
- David Parry
- Zach Pascal
- Jack Patera
- Jerome Pathon
- Dezmon Patmon
- Garin Patrick
- Joel Patten
- Eric Patterson
- Kwity Paye
- Dave Pear
- Preston Pearson
- Willis Peguese
- Tupe Peko
- Bill Pellington
- David Pender
- Jeris Pendleton
- Gene Pepper
- Bruce Perkins
- Ray Perkins
- Joe Perry
- Joshua Perry
- Jim Perryman
- Mike Person
- Christian Peter
- Ted Petersen
- Jerry Peterson
- Mike Peterson
- Neal Petties
- Carroll Phillips
- Ryan Phillips
- Shaun Phillips
- Alec Pierce
- Pete Pierson
- Reggie Pinkney
- Danny Pinter
- Lenzy Pipkins
- Quinn Pitcock
- Charlie Pittman
- Michael Pittman Jr.
- Ron Plantz
- Bruce Plummer
- Chad Plummer
- Sherman Plunkett
- Mike Pollak
- Marcus Pollard
- Barney Poole
- Tyrone Poole
- Kendyll Pope
- Ricky Porter
- Ron Porter
- Tracy Porter
- Roosevelt Potts
- Carl Powell
- Jerraud Powers
- Shaun Prater
- Germaine Pratt
- Robert Pratt
- George Preas
- D'Vonte Price
- Sheldon Price
- Billy Pricer
- Mike Prior
- Ricky Proehl
- James Pruitt
- Matt Pryor
- David Pugh
- Loucheiz Purifoy
- Brad Pyatt
- Palmer Pyle

== Q ==
- Kelcy Quarles

== R ==
- Bob Raba
- George Radachowsky
- Scott Radecic
- George Radosevich
- Jim Raiff
- Bernhard Raimann
- Chris Rainey
- LaJuan Ramsey
- Tom Ramsey
- Tate Randle
- Thomas Randolph
- Brian Ratigan
- Keiwan Ratliff
- John Ray
- Dave Rayner
- Montae Reagor
- Bert Rechichar
- Glen Redd
- Cory Redding
- Adam Redmond
- Will Redmond
- Chris Reed
- David Reed
- Mark Reed
- Guy Reese
- Darrell Reid
- Dexter Reid
- Spencer Reid
- Joe Reitz
- Roger Remo
- Dean Renfro
- Glenn Ressler
- Danny Rhodes
- Dominic Rhodes
- Luke Rhodes
- Xavier Rhodes
- Forrest Rhyne
- Simeon Rice
- Jamey Richard
- Anthony Richardson
- Jerry Richardson
- Mike Richardson
- Trent Richardson
- Willie Richardson
- Tom Ricketts
- Hassan Ridgeway
- Butch Riley
- Eugene Riley
- Andre Rison
- Philip Rivers
- Mike Roberg
- Charley Robinson
- Freddie Robinson
- Gijon Robinson
- Glenn Robinson
- Josh Robinson
- Patrick Robinson
- Courtney Roby
- Isaac Rochell
- Amari Rodgers
- Isaiah Rodgers
- Chester Rogers
- Da'Rick Rogers
- Nick Rogers
- Dave Rowe
- Andre Royal
- Chris Rucker
- Tim Rudnick
- T. J. Rushing
- Matt Ryan
- Mark Rypien

== S ==
- Brad Saar
- Sean Salisbury
- Jerome Sally
- Bryant Salter
- Johnny Sample
- Rigoberto Sanchez
- Bob Sanders
- Glenell Sanders
- Alex Sandusky
- Leo Sanford
- Darnell Sankey
- Tom Santi
- Gerome Sapp
- Samson Satele
- Howard Satterwhite
- Jeff Saturday
- Bill Saul
- Weslye Saunders
- Art Schlichter
- Joe Schmiesing
- Bo Schobel
- Bill Schultz
- Brad Scioli
- Steve Sciullo
- Chris Scott
- Daniel Scott
- Freddie Scott (born 1952)
- Freddie Scott (born 1974)
- Jake Scott
- Andrew Sendejo
- Jordan Senn
- Trey Sermon
- Clint Session
- Ed Sharkey
- George Shaw
- Jabaal Sheard
- Kendel Shello
- Kelvin Sheppard
- Dave Sherer
- Tim Sherwin
- Burrell Shields
- Lebron Shields
- Paul Shields
- John Shinners
- Don Shinnick
- A. Q. Shipley
- Sanders Shiver
- Boris Shlapak
- Darin Shoulders
- Spencer Shrader
- David Shula
- Don Shula
- Mike Siani
- Josh Sills
- Jamie Silva
- Dave Simmons
- John Simmons
- Stacey Simmons
- Tony Simmons
- Corey Simon
- John Simon
- Ed Simonini
- Dave Simonson
- Chad Simpson
- Jackie Simpson
- Ernie Sims
- Marvin Sims
- Tom Sims
- Tommy Sims
- John Sinnott
- Tony Siragusa
- Matt Slauson
- Scott Slutzker
- Torrance Small
- Eric Smedley
- Billy Ray Smith Sr.
- Braden Smith
- Bubba Smith
- Byron Smith
- Detron Smith
- D'Joun Smith
- Ed Smith
- Holden Smith
- Hunter Smith
- Ollie Smith
- Phil Smith
- Taj Smith
- Tevaun Smith
- Thomas Smith
- Tremon Smith
- Zeke Smith
- Mark Smolinski
- Justin Snow
- Al Snyder
- Pat Snyder
- Ron Solt
- Mike Sommer
- Jim Sorgi
- Bradley Sowell
- Ameer Speed
- E.J. Speed
- Sean Spence
- Cotton Speyrer
- Art Spinney
- Brian Stablein
- Taylor Stallworth
- Harry Stanback
- Tony Stargell
- Rohn Stark
- Joe Staysniak
- Howard Stevens
- Grover Stewart
- Jason Stewart
- Shyrone Stith
- Mark Stock
- Brandon Stokley
- Avatus Stone
- Steve Stonebreaker
- Matt Stover
- Michael Strachan
- Devin Street
- George Streeter
- Donald Strickland
- Mike Strofolino
- Grant Stuard
- Andy Studebaker
- Charlie Stukes
- Andy Stynchula
- Dan Sullivan
- Craig Swoope
- Erik Swoope
- Sam Sword
- Dick Szymanski

== T ==
- George Taliaferro
- Jacob Tamme
- Carl Taseff
- David Tate
- David Taylor
- Hosea Taylor
- Jim Bob Taylor
- Jonathan Taylor
- Keith Taylor
- Shakial Taylor
- Lance Teichelman
- Marvell Tell III
- Luke Tenuta
- Mike Tepper
- Martin Tevaseu
- Ahmad Thomas
- Donald Thomas
- Jaimie Thomas
- Jesse Thomas
- Josh Thomas (born 1981)
- Josh Thomas (born 1989)
- Kevin Thomas
- Mark Thomas
- Ratcliff Thomas
- Rodney Thomas II
- Spencer Thomas
- Arland Thompson
- Don Thompson
- Donnel Thompson
- Donnell Thompson
- Norm Thompson
- Ricky Thompson
- David Thornton
- Hugh Thornton
- Reggie Thornton
- Don Thorp
- Craphonso Thorpe
- Fuzzy Thurston
- Zurlon Tipton
- Jordan Todman
- Noah Togiai
- Gregory Toler
- Scott Tolzien
- Pat Tomberlin
- Ed Toner
- Marco Tongue
- Zollie Toth
- Michael Toudouze
- Deshea Townsend
- Jalen Travis
- Ross Travis
- Laquon Treadwell
- Morgan Trent
- Nate Triplett
- Larry Tripplett
- Bill Troup
- Jack Trudeau
- Justin Tryon
- Dalton Tucker
- JT Tuimoloau
- Van Tuinei
- Willie Tullis
- Tom Tupa
- Kemoko Turay
- Robert Turbin
- Bake Turner
- Floyd Turner
- Ricky Turner

== U ==
- Tony Ugoh
- Matt Ulrich
- Johnny Unitas
- Ben Utecht
- Ben Utt

== V ==
- Eric Vance
- Matt Vanderbeek
- Mike Vanderjagt
- Jason Vander Laan
- Mark Vander Poel
- Randy Van Divier
- Bob Van Duyne
- Tyler Varga
- Mike Varty
- Cassius Vaughn
- Chip Vaughn
- Jared Veldheer
- Clarence Verdin
- Billy Vessels
- Kipp Vickers
- Adam Vinatieri
- Scott Virkus
- Bob Vogel
- Rick Volk
- Kurt Vollers
- Scott Von der Ahe
- Jeremy Vujnovich

== W ==
- Henry Waechter
- Mark Walczak
- Erik Walden
- Anthony Walker Jr.
- Joe Walker
- Tony Walker
- Jackie Wallace
- Raymond Walls
- Steve Walsh
- Troy Walters
- Charvarius Ward
- Jihad Ward
- Jim Ward
- Lamont Warren
- Tyler Warren
- Charles Washington
- Joe Washington
- Marcus Washington
- Ronnie Washington
- Trey Washington
- Damon Watts
- Reggie Wayne
- Clarence Weathers
- J'Marcus Webb
- Jim Welch
- Mike Wells
- Jonathan Welsh
- Carson Wentz
- Björn Werner
- Derek West
- Jamaal Westerman
- Griff Whalen
- Philip Wheeler
- Blair White
- Bob White
- Brad White
- D. J. White
- Stan White
- Charlie Whitehurst
- Keyon Whiteside
- Bernard Whittington
- Doug Widell
- Jermaine Wiggins
- J. J. Wilcox
- Daryl Wilkerson
- Jordan Wilkins
- Terrence Wilkins
- Brandon Williams
- Chad Williams
- Chris Williams
- Duke Williams
- Frankie Williams
- John Williams (born 1945)
- John Williams (born 1960)
- Jonathan Williams
- Josh Williams
- Kendall Williams
- Kerwynn Williams
- Kevin Williams
- Newton Williams
- Oliver Williams
- Payton Williams
- Ricky Williams
- Sid Williams
- Steve Williams
- Teddy Williams
- Trey Williams
- Vaughn Williams
- Warren Williams
- Khari Willis
- Trevor Wilmot
- Butch Wilson
- Jamie Wilson
- Quincy Wilson
- Tavon Wilson
- Bill Windauer
- Robert Windsor
- Juwann Winfree
- Elmer Wingate
- Jim Winkler
- Billy Winn
- Blaise Winter
- Leo Wisniewski
- Will Wolford
- Samuel Womack
- Royce Womble
- George Wonsley
- Mike Wood
- Al Woods
- Antwaun Woods
- Jelani Woods
- Mike Woods
- Tito Wooten
- Vince Workman
- Chris Wormley
- Victor Worsley
- George Wright
- Johnnie Wright
- Steve Wright
- Terry Wright

== Y ==
- Rock Ya-Sin
- Phil Yeboah-Kodie
- Dave Yohn
- Anthony Young
- Buddy Young
- Dave Young
- Dick Young
- Fredd Young

== Z ==
- Steve Zabel
- Tom Zbikowski
- Jeff Zgonina
