= Indianapolis Colts all-time roster (A–K) =

1,572 players have appeared in at least one regular season or postseason game in the National Football League (NFL) for the Indianapolis Colts franchise since 1953. This list includes those whose last names fall between "A" and "K". For the rest of the players, see Indianapolis Colts all-time roster (L–Z). This list is accurate through the end of the 2025 NFL season.

== A ==
- Karim Abdul-Jabbar
- Ameer Abdullah
- Sid Abramowitz
- George Achica
- Kris Adams
- Matthew Adams
- Mike Adams
- Jahleel Addae
- Joseph Addai
- Mario Addison
- Adetomiwa Adebawore
- Daniel Adongo
- Al Afalava
- Alex Agase
- Mel Agee
- McTelvin Agim
- Dave Ahrens
- Kamar Aiken
- Austin Ajiake
- Trev Alberts
- Elijah Alexander
- Mo Alie-Cox
- Raul Allegre
- Brian Allen
- Dwayne Allen
- Jerry Allen
- Ryan Allen
- Don Alley
- Mack Alston
- O'Brien Alston
- Ashley Ambrose
- Alan Ameche
- Richard Amman
- Colt Anderson
- Don Anderson
- Flipper Anderson
- Henry Anderson
- Jack Anderson
- Jamaal Anderson
- Kim Anderson
- Larry Anderson
- Liam Anderson
- John Andrews
- Josh Andrews
- Shane Andrus
- Pat Angerer
- Charles Arbuckle
- Brandon Archer
- David Arkin
- Phil Armour
- Harvey Armstrong
- Devin Aromashodu
- Larry Asante
- Jess Atkinson
- Billy Austin
- Ocie Austin
- Thomas Austin
- Denico Autry
- Troy Auzenne
- Sisto Averno
- Donnie Avery
- Genard Avery
- Akeem Ayers

== B ==
- Joe Bachie
- Waine Bacon
- Michael Badgley
- Aaron Bailey
- Don Bailey
- Elmer Bailey
- Jim Bailey
- Darrell Baker
- Jason Baker
- Ron Baker
- Shannon Baker
- Brian Baldinger
- Gary Baldinger
- Karl Baldischwiler
- Bob Baldwin
- Ervin Baldwin
- Lance Ball
- Michael Ball
- Sam Ball
- Pat Ballage
- Quinton Ballard
- Vick Ballard
- Joey Banes
- Chip Banks
- Chuck Banks
- Roy Banks
- Ben Banogu
- Bradford Banta
- Mike Barber
- Earnest Barnes
- Lionel Barnes
- Mike Barnes
- Dick Barwegan
- Tarell Basham
- Idrees Bashir
- Hank Baskett
- Trevor Bates
- John Baylor
- Tim Baylor
- Pat Beach
- Joique Bell
- Kerwin Bell
- Mark Bell
- Mark Bellini
- Jason Belser
- Bill Benjamin
- Cornelius Bennett
- Tony Bennett
- Charles Benson
- Mitchell Benson
- Albert Bentley
- Kevin Bentley
- Ulysses Bentley IV
- Tim Berra
- Bertrand Berry
- Raymond Berry
- Tony Bertuca
- Antoine Bethea
- Tom Beutler
- Dean Biasucci
- Duane Bickett
- Dick Bielski
- Jack Bighead
- Cory Bird
- Julian Blackmon
- Mekhi Blackmon
- Robert Blackmon
- Lyle Blackwood
- Brian Blados
- Cary Blanchard
- Ernie Blandin
- Rodrigo Blankenship
- Tom Bleick
- Tony Blevins
- Forrest Blue
- Austin Blythe
- Briean Boddy-Calhoun
- Evan Boehm
- Ike Boettger
- Mark Boggs
- Rocky Boiman
- Deyshawn Bond
- Shane Bonham
- Tanor Bortolini
- Jon Bostic
- Matt Bouza
- Bobby Boyd
- Mark Boyer
- Ordell Braase
- Greg Bracelin
- Gary Brackett
- Ahmad Bradshaw
- Jeff Brady
- Kerry Brady
- Mike Bragg
- John Brandes
- Michael Brandon
- Chad Bratzke
- Quan Bray
- Tyler Brayton
- Larry Braziel
- LaVon Brazill
- K. J. Brent
- Julius Brents
- Monte Brethauer
- Dewell Brewer
- Doug Brien
- Jacoby Brissett
- Raheem Brock
- Ben Bronson
- Bill Brooks
- Chris Brooks
- Rodregis Brooks
- Bob Brotzki
- Willie Broughton
- Andre Brown
- Barry Brown
- Cornelius Brown
- Donald Brown
- Ed Brown
- Gordon Brown
- Jalil Brown
- Jerry Brown
- Ray Brown
- Sergio Brown
- Stevie Brown
- Timmy Brown
- Tony Brown
- Taven Bryan
- Walter Bryan
- Matt Bryant
- Steve Bryant
- Ray Buchanan
- DeForest Buckner
- Norm Bulaich
- Melvin Bullitt
- Brian Bulluck
- Randy Burke
- Jackie Burkett
- Jeff Burris
- James Burroughs
- Sammie Burroughs
- Trey Burton
- Tyreek Burwell
- Paul Butcher
- Darius Butler
- Ray Butler
- Victor Butler
- Camryn Bynum

== C ==
- Deon Cain
- David Caldwell)
- Jack Call
- Kevin Call
- Joe Campanella
- Ibraheim Campbell
- John Campbell
- Parris Campbell
- James Cannida
- Mark Cannon
- Wayne Capers
- Jaylon Carlies
- Roger Caron
- Roger Carr
- T. J. Carrie
- Chris Carter
- Delone Carter
- Tony Carter
- Milt Carthens
- Maurice Carthon
- Ran Carthon
- Mel Carver
- Kerry Cash
- Anthony Castonzo
- Chris Chandler
- Josh Chapman
- Kory Chapman
- Jeff Charleston
- Ricky Chatman
- Ernie Cheatham
- Gosder Cherilus
- Stan Cherry
- Anthony Chesley
- Larry Chester
- Raymond Chester
- Jim Cheyunski
- Tashard Choice
- Jason Chorak
- Dick Chorovich
- Eugene Chung
- Sam Clancy
- Dallas Clark
- Ken Clark
- Le'Raven Clark
- Rico Clark
- Conrad Clarks
- Bob Clemens
- Kameron Cline
- Dextor Clinkscale
- Colin Cloherty
- Michael Coe
- Mike Cofer
- Chase Coffman
- Gail Cogdill
- Terry Cole
- Trent Cole
- Leonard Coleman
- James Coley
- Trevon Coley
- Elmer Collett
- Austin Collie
- Kerry Collins
- Craig Colquitt
- Lloyd Colteryahn
- Jim Colvin
- Brannon Condren
- Larry Conjar
- Steve Conley
- Chris Conlin
- Kavell Conner
- Fred Cook
- Ed Cooke
- Johnie Cooks
- José Cortéz
- Quentin Coryatt
- Chad Cota
- Keke Coutee
- Larry Coutre
- John Covington
- Byron Cowart
- Aaron Cox
- Nate Craddock
- Joe Cribbs
- Josh Cribbs
- Jeff Criswell
- Zack Crockett
- Antonio Cromartie
- Cleveland Crosby
- Clifton Crosby
- Nick Cross
- Terry Crouch
- Rodney Culver
- Justice Cunningham
- Rick Cunningham
- Gary Cuozzo
- Bill Curry
- Craig Curry
- Shane Curry
- Mike Curtis
- Tom Curtis

== D ==
- Eugene Daniel
- Kenny Daniel
- Darrell Daniels
- Byron Darby
- Joe Dean Davenport
- Julién Davenport
- Najeh Davenport
- Jason David
- Cotton Davidson
- Akeem Davis
- Buster Davis
- Carey Davis
- Carl Davis
- Khalil Davis
- Lee Davis
- Milt Davis
- Norman Davis
- Preston Davis
- Raekwon Davis
- Sean Davis
- Ted Davis
- Travis Davis
- Vontae Davis
- Sean Dawkins
- Clifton Dawson
- Keyunta Dawson
- Sheldon Day
- Art DeCarlo
- Donnie Dee
- Jack Del Bello
- Jeff Delaney
- Rick DeMulling
- Trevor Denbow
- Autry Denson
- Richard Dent
- Brian DeRoo
- Pierre Desir
- Kyle DeVan
- Dan Dickel
- Eric Dickerson
- Curtis Dickey
- John Diehl
- Ryan Diem
- Zac Diles
- Ken Dilger
- Bucky Dilts
- Antonio Dixon
- Randy Dixon
- Titus Dixon
- Zachary Dixon
- Chris Doering
- Jason Doering
- JoJo Domann
- Marty Domres
- Ray Donaldson
- Art Donovan
- Phillip Dorsett
- DeDe Dorsey
- Mike Doss
- Glenn Doughty
- Josh Downs
- Jack Doyle
- Tom Drougas
- Ashton Dulin
- Jim Duncan
- Lenny Dunlap
- Perry Lee Dunn
- L. G. Dupre
- Steve Durham
- John Dutton

== E ==
- Jacob Eason
- Eric Ebron
- Samson Ebukam
- Brad Ecklund
- A. J. Edds
- Randy Edmunds
- Dan Edwards
- Johnathan Edwards
- Lavar Edwards
- Doug Eggers
- Sam Ehlinger
- Joe Ehrmann
- Stan Eisenhooth
- Andy Ekern
- Jake Eldrenkamp
- Brody Eldridge
- Keith Elias
- Bill Elko
- Mel Embree
- Steve Emtman
- Fred Enke
- Craig Erickson
- Trai Essex
- Carlos Etheredge
- Darren Evans

== F ==
- Anthony Fabiano
- Brandon Facyson
- Matthias Farley
- Marshall Faulk
- Jeff Faulkner
- Wiley Feagin
- Tom Feamster
- Grant Feasel
- Daniel Federkeil
- Joe Federspiel
- Jerome Felton
- Bobby Felts
- Joe Ferguson
- Josh Ferguson
- Ron Fernandes
- Ethan Fernea
- Greg Fields
- Jitter Fields
- Cedric Figaro
- Jim Finn
- Tom Finnin
- Eric Fisher
- Joe Flacco
- Coby Fleener
- Bryan Fletcher
- Bernie Flowers
- Dallis Flowers
- Dick Flowers
- Tre Flowers
- Anthony Floyd
- Moise Fokou
- Nick Foles
- Tim Foley
- Albert Fontenot
- Chris Foote
- Dan Footman
- Justin Forsett
- Eric Foster
- Daurice Fountain
- Aaron Francisco
- Aubrayo Franklin
- Cleveland Franklin
- Willie Franklin
- Zaire Franklin
- Derrick Frazier
- Blake Freeland
- Jerrell Freeman
- Josh Freeman
- Dwight Freeney
- Makoa Freitas
- Wesley French
- Will Fries
- Mike Fultz
- Devin Funchess
- Jake Funk

== G ==
- Neville Gallimore
- Chris Gambol
- Rusty Ganas
- Dylan Gandy
- Pierre Garçon
- Ron Gardin
- Ellis Gardner
- Gilbert Gardner
- Sauce Gardner
- Chris Gardocki
- Mike Garrett
- Ben Garry
- Dennis Gaubatz
- Matt Gay
- Clayton Geathers
- Clifton Geathers
- Ed George
- Jeff George
- Jeremiah George
- Frank Giannetti
- David Gibson
- DJ Giddens
- Sam Giguère
- Tom Gilburg
- John Gill
- Owen Gill
- Stephon Gilmore
- Hubert Ginn
- Matt Giordano
- Jordan Glasgow
- Nesby Glasgow
- Cody Glenn
- Tarik Glenn
- Gary Glick
- Phil Glover
- Tay Glover-Wright
- Mark Glowinski
- Johnathan Goddard
- Jerry Golsteyn
- Matt Goncalves
- Anthony Gonzalez
- Joaquin Gonzalez
- Denzelle Good
- Chris Goode
- Najee Goode
- Tom Goode
- Tyler Goodson
- Lennox Gordon
- Josh Gordy
- Frank Gore
- Adam Gotsis
- Anthony Gould
- Jermaine Grace
- Nick Graham
- Martín Gramática
- Kylen Granson
- Alan Grant
- Bob Grant
- Ryan Grant
- Steve Grant
- Marsharne Graves
- Carlton Gray
- Cecil Gray
- Derwin Gray
- Bubba Green
- Chaz Green
- E. G. Green
- Farrod Green
- Marshay Green
- T. J. Green
- Scott Greene
- Ken Gregory
- Wade Griffin
- Perry Griggs
- Dan Grimm
- Ed Grimsley
- Geneo Grissom
- Clif Groce
- Chris Gronkowski
- Lee Gross
- Blake Grupe
- Lawrence Guy
- Winston Guy
- Ramon Guzman

== H ==
- Matt Haack
- Drew Haddad
- Joe Haeg
- Tyjuan Hagler
- John Haines
- Nate Hairston
- De'von Hall
- Randy Hall
- Roy Hall
- Steve Hall
- Arlington Hambright
- Ken Hamlin
- Bob Hamm
- Jermaine Hampton
- Kevin Hancock
- Jon Hand
- Johnathan Hankins
- Jim Harbaugh
- James Harbour
- Don Hardeman
- Steve Hardin
- Jim Harness
- George Harold
- Nick Harper
- Shawn Harper
- DeMichael Harris
- Joe Harris
- Sean Harris
- Walt Harris
- Wendell Harris
- Bob Harrison
- Dwight Harrison
- Jonotthan Harrison
- Marvin Harrison
- Ronnie Harrison
- Jeff Hart
- Mike Hart
- Ben Hartsock
- Mario Harvey
- Matt Hasselbeck
- Derrick Hatchett
- Steve Hathaway
- Tim Hauck
- Stanley Havili
- Sam Havrilak
- Alex Hawkins
- Greg Hawthorne
- Kelvin Hayden
- Alvin Haymond
- Matt Hazel
- Kellen Heard
- Shawn Heffern
- Steve Heimkreiter
- Darryl Hemphill
- Ted Hendricks
- Bernard Henry
- Steve Henry
- Lonnie Hepburn
- Johnny Hermann
- Brian Herosian
- Todd Herremans
- Amarlo Herrera
- Mark Herrmann
- Jeff Herrod
- Dan Herron
- Jessie Hester
- Chris Hetherington
- Ryan Hewitt
- Craig Heyward
- Darrius Heyward-Bey
- Dallas Hickman
- Justin Hickman
- Brandon Hicks
- Dwight Hicks
- Rusty Hilger
- Anthony Hill
- Jerry Hill
- Michael Hill
- Corey Hilliard
- Tony Hills
- Mike Hilton
- Roy Hilton
- T. Y. Hilton
- Jermale Hines
- Nyheim Hines
- Chris Hinton
- Chuck Hinton
- Eddie Hinton
- Fred Hoaglin
- Krishawn Hogan
- Gary Hogeboom
- Kelly Holcomb
- Will Holden
- Dwight Hollier
- Cornell Holloway
- Rob Holmberg
- Darick Holmes
- Khaled Holmes
- Bernard Holsey
- John Holt
- Malik Hooker
- Dick Horn
- Justin Houston
- Marcus Howard
- Xavien Howard
- Garry Howe
- Delano Howell
- Brian Hoyer
- Brock Huard
- Nat Hudson
- Ken Huff
- Darvell Huffman
- Harry Hugasian
- Dante Hughes
- Jerry Hughes
- Montori Hughes
- Robert Hughes
- Evan Hull
- Ramon Humber
- Mike Humiston
- David Humm
- Ronald Humphrey
- Leonard Humphries
- Lamonte Hunley
- George Hunt
- Joey Hunt
- Margus Hunt
- Ivy Joe Hunter
- James Hunter
- Von Hutchins
- Trevor Hutton
- John Huzvar
- Glenn Hyde

== I ==
- Ben Ijalana
- Dontrelle Inman
- Trevor Insley
- Nate Irving
- Qadry Ismail

== J ==
- Andrew Jackson
- Deon Jackson
- D'Qwell Jackson
- Edwin Jackson
- Ken Jackson
- Marcus Jackson
- Mark Jackson
- Marlin Jackson
- Victor Jackson
- Waverly Jackson
- Nate Jacquet
- Brandon James
- Charles James
- Edgerrin James
- Javarris James
- June James
- Tommy James
- Ralph Jarvis
- Matt Jaworski
- Ricky Jean-Francois
- Joseph Jefferson
- Malik Jefferson
- Roy Jefferson
- Fletcher Jenkins
- Tim Jennings
- Andre Johnson
- Anthony Johnson (born 1967)
- Anthony Johnson (born 1993)
- Antonio Johnson
- Buddy Johnson
- Cam Johnson
- Charlie Johnson
- Cornelius Johnson
- Curtis Johnson
- Ed Johnson
- Ellis Johnson
- Eric Johnson
- Ezra Johnson
- Greg Johnson
- Jason Johnson
- Kelley Johnson
- Marcus Johnson
- Marshall Johnson
- Terrence Johnson
- Arthur Jones
- Bert Jones
- Brian Jones
- Bryant Jones
- Daniel Jones
- Dominique Jones
- Isaac Jones
- Jaylon Jones
- Joe Jones
- Josh Jones
- Matt Jones
- Richard Jones
- Ricky Jones
- Antony Jordan
- Steve Jordan
- Kelvin Joseph
- Vance Joseph
- Don Joyce
- Cato June
- Steve Justice
- Winston Justice
- Paul Justin
- Sid Justin

== K ==
- Michael Kaczmarek
- Mark Kafentzis
- Nikola Kalinic
- Kyle Kalis
- Tommy Kalmanir
- Jeremy Kapinos
- Khalid Kareem
- Deji Karim
- Tom Keane
- Tim Kearse
- Freddy Keiaho
- Kenton Keith
- Scott Kellar
- Dennis Kelly
- Ryan Kelly
- Jimmie Kennedy
- Gary Kerkorian
- Rex Kern
- Zach Kerr
- Thakarius Keyes
- Blair Kiel
- Danny Kight
- Brandon King
- Deon King
- Justin King
- Mitch King
- Shawn King
- Bill Kirchiro
- Mark Kirchner
- Mike Kirkland
- Lou Kirouac
- Dan Klecko
- Joe Klecko
- Steve Knight
- Matt Kofler
- Bill Koman
- Ron Kostelnik
- Ed Kovac
- Jim Krahl
- Barry Krauss
- Henry Krieger-Coble
- Ray Krouse
- George Kunz
