= List of NFL players (E) =

This is a list of players who have appeared in at least one regular season or postseason game in the National Football League (NFL), American Football League (AFL), or All-America Football Conference (AAFC) and have a last name that starts with "E". This list is accurate through the end of the 2025 NFL season.

== Ea–Eh ==
- Nate Eachus
- James Eaddy
- Ed Eagan
- Alex Eagle
- Eagle Feather
- Larry Eaglin
- Kay Eakin
- Biren Ealy
- Kony Ealy
- Ralph Earhart
- Glenn Earl
- Robin Earl
- Jim Earley
- Guy Early
- Quinn Early
- Blaine Earon
- Jug Earp
- Dominique Easley
- Kenny Easley
- Marcus Easley
- Walt Easley
- Doug Easlick
- Ricky Easmon
- Bo Eason
- Jacob Eason
- John Eason
- Nick Eason
- Nijrell Eason
- Roger Eason
- Tony Eason
- Andrew East
- Ron East
- Ray Easterling
- Nick Easton
- Omar Easy
- Irv Eatman
- Chad Eaton
- Lou Eaton
- Scott Eaton
- Tracey Eaton
- Vic Eaton
- Harry Ebding
- Rick Eber
- Jess Eberdt
- Dominik Eberle
- Hal Ebersole
- John Ebersole
- Jeremy Ebert
- Beanie Eberts
- Arnold Ebiketie
- Ray Ebli
- Nate Ebner
- Trestan Ebner
- Justin Eboigbe
- Eric Ebron
- Samson Ebukam
- Byron Eby
- Scott Eccles
- Adimchinobe Echemandu
- Brandin Echols
- Donnie Echols
- Fate Echols
- Mike Echols
- Terry Echols
- Keith Eck
- Gus Eckberg
- Kyle Eckel
- Ed Ecker
- Ox Eckhardt
- Bob Eckl
- Brad Ecklund
- Dolph Eckstein
- Jerry Eckwood
- Andrew Economos
- Floyd Eddings
- Robert Eddins
- A. J. Edds
- Nick Eddy
- Kasim Edebali
- Brad Edelman
- Julian Edelman
- Bill Edgar
- Shayne Edge
- Booker Edgerson
- Paul Edinger
- Cornelius Edison
- Dominique Edison
- Deke Edler
- Bobby Joe Edmonds
- Chase Edmonds
- Chris Edmonds (born 1978)
- Chris Edmonds (born 2001)
- Van Edmondson
- Ferrell Edmunds
- Randy Edmunds
- Terrell Edmunds
- Tremaine Edmunds
- Trey Edmunds
- Chuma Edoga
- Al Edwards
- Anthony Edwards
- Antonio Edwards
- Antuan Edwards
- Armanti Edwards
- Austin Edwards
- Ben Edwards
- Brad Edwards
- Braylon Edwards
- Bryan Edwards
- Bud Edwards
- Cap Edwards
- Cid Edwards
- Dan Edwards
- Dave Edwards (born 1939)
- Dave Edwards (born 1962)
- David Edwards
- Dennis Edwards
- Dixon Edwards
- Donnie Edwards
- Dovonte Edwards
- Dwan Edwards
- Earl Edwards
- Eddie Edwards
- Emmett Edwards
- Eric Edwards
- Glen Edwards
- Gus Edwards
- Herm Edwards
- Jimmy Edwards
- Johnathan Edwards
- Kalimba Edwards
- Kelvin Edwards
- Lac Edwards
- Lavar Edwards
- Lloyd Edwards
- Marc Edwards
- Mario Edwards
- Mario Edwards Jr.
- Marshall Edwards
- Mike Edwards
- Monk Edwards
- Patrick Edwards
- Randy Edwards
- Ray Edwards
- Robert Edwards
- Ron Edwards
- Stan Edwards
- Steve Edwards
- T. J. Edwards
- Terrence Edwards
- Tim Edwards
- Tom Edwards
- Trent Edwards
- Troy Edwards
- Turk Edwards
- Vernon Edwards
- Weldon Edwards
- Clyde Edwards-Helaire
- Dick Egan (born ?)
- Dick Egan (born 1904)
- Pannel Egboh
- Emeka Egbuka
- Emeke Egbule
- Doug Eggers
- Ron Egloff
- Michael Egnew
- Patrick Egu
- Kingsley Eguakun
- Samuel Eguavoen
- Chuck Ehin
- Parker Ehinger
- Tom Ehlers
- Sam Ehlinger
- Clyde Ehrhardt
- Joe Ehrmann

== Ei–En ==
- John Eibner
- Liam Eichenberg
- Tommy Eichenberg
- Ray Eichenlaub
- Edmund Eiden
- Jim Eiden
- Jim Eidson
- Tyler Eifert
- Milo Eifler
- Jim Eifrid
- Charley Eikenberg
- Pat Eilers
- Mike Eischeid
- Dieter Eiselen
- Larry Eisenhauer
- John Eisenhooth
- Stan Eisenhooth
- Alfred Eissler
- Chris Eitzmann
- Duke Ejiofor
- Isaiah Ekejiuba
- Austin Ekeler
- Andy Ekern
- Carl Ekern
- Daniel Ekuale
- Ebenezer Ekuban
- Ikem Ekwonu
- Abram Elam
- Cleveland Elam
- Jason Elam
- Kaiir Elam
- Matt Elam
- Onzy Elam
- Shane Elam
- Corn Elder
- Donnie Elder
- Jake Eldrenkamp
- Brody Eldridge
- Mohammed Elewonibi
- Clifton Eley
- Monroe Eley
- Pat Elflein
- Bruce Elia
- Homer Elias
- Keith Elias
- Don Eliason
- Ukeme Eligwe
- Jim Eliopulos
- Chief Elkins
- Ev Elkins
- Larry Elkins
- Mike Elkins
- Bill Elko
- Henry Ellard
- Ben Ellefson
- Jack Ellena
- Bill Ellenbogen
- Rich Ellender
- Gene Ellenson
- Carl Eller
- Dannell Ellerbe
- Emmanuel Ellerbee
- Don Ellersick
- Gary Ellerson
- Aaron Elling
- Andre Ellington
- Bruce Ellington
- Dante Ellington
- Al Elliott
- Carl Elliott
- Charlie Elliott
- DeAndre Elliott
- DeShon Elliott
- Doc Elliott
- Ezekiel Elliott
- Jake Elliott
- Jalen Elliott
- Jamin Elliott
- Javien Elliott
- Jayrone Elliott
- Jim Elliott
- John Elliott
- Jordan Elliott
- Jumbo Elliott
- Kevin Elliott
- Lenvil Elliott
- Lin Elliott
- Matt Elliott
- Ted Elliott
- Tony Elliott (born 1959)
- Tony Elliott (born 1964)
- Alex Ellis
- Allan Ellis
- Chris Ellis
- Clarence Ellis
- Craig Ellis
- Devale Ellis
- Drew Ellis
- Ed Ellis
- Gerry Ellis
- Greg Ellis
- Herb Ellis
- Jim Ellis
- John Ellis
- Justin Ellis
- Ken Ellis
- Kenrick Ellis
- Kwame Ellis
- Larry Ellis
- Ray Ellis
- Roger Ellis
- Sedrick Ellis
- Shaun Ellis
- Walt Ellis
- Atiyyah Ellison
- Glenn Ellison
- Jerry Ellison
- Keith Ellison
- Kevin Ellison
- Mark Ellison
- Omar Ellison
- Rhett Ellison
- Riki Ellison
- Willie Ellison
- Christian Elliss
- Jonah Elliss
- Kaden Elliss
- Luther Elliss
- Bud Ellor
- Swede Ellstrom
- Percy Ellsworth
- Charley Ellzey
- Hicham El-Mashtoub
- Dave Elmendorf
- Doug Elmore
- Shorty Elness
- Joey Eloms
- Jimbo Elrod
- Earl Elser
- Earl Elsey
- Neil Elshire
- Dutch Elston
- Trae Elston
- Leo Elter
- Jermaine Eluemunor
- John Elway
- Jack Elwell
- Harold Ely
- Larry Ely
- Paul Elzey
- Ben Emanuel
- Bert Emanuel
- Charles Emanuel
- Frank Emanuel
- Kyle Emanuel
- Keith Embray
- John Embree
- Jon Embree
- Mel Embree
- Pete Emelianchik
- Bob Emerick
- Martin Emerson
- Ox Emerson
- Vern Emerson
- Larry Emery
- Prince Emili
- Nick Emmanwori
- Carlos Emmons
- Frank Emmons
- Red Emslie
- Steve Emtman
- Justin Ena
- Kingsley Enagbare
- Dick Enderle
- Al Endress
- Vic Endress
- IK Enemkpali
- Paul Engebretsen
- Greg Engel
- Steve Engel
- John Engelberger
- Joe Engelhard
- Wuert Engelmann
- Eric England
- Derek Engler
- Rick Engles
- Auston English
- Doug English
- Keith English
- Larry English
- Harry Englund
- Bobby Engram
- Evan Engram
- Art Engstrom
- Steve Enich
- Curtis Enis
- Hunter Enis
- Fred Enke
- Rex Enright
- Quincy Enunwa
- Bill Enyart
- Jamar Enzor

== Ep–Ez ==
- A. J. Epenesa
- Alonzo Ephraim
- Pat Epperson
- Bobby Epps
- Dedrick Epps
- Jack Epps
- Marcus Epps
- Phil Epps
- Tory Epps
- Hayden Epstein
- Dick Erdlitz
- Arch Erehart
- Rich Erenberg
- Bud Ericksen
- Alex Erickson
- Bernie Erickson
- Bill Erickson
- Craig Erickson
- E. Erickson
- Hal Erickson
- Harold Erickson
- Mickey Erickson
- Swede Erickson
- Walden Erickson
- Tom Erlandson
- Tom Erlandson
- Donnie Ernsberger
- Jack Ernst
- Mike Ernst
- Paul Ernster
- Aireontae Ersery
- Zach Ertz
- Tyler Ervin
- Cameron Erving
- Ricky Ervins
- Bill Erwig
- Terry Erwin
- Russell Erxleben
- Herb Eschbach
- Gavin Escobar
- Len Eshmont
- Boomer Esiason
- D'Wayne Eskridge
- Al Espie
- Alex Espinoza
- Mike Esposito
- Mike Espy
- Clarence Esser
- Trai Essex
- Ron Essink
- Charlie Essman
- Greg Estandia
- Richard Estell
- Mike Estep
- Don Estes
- John Estes
- Larry Estes
- Patrick Estes
- Audric Estime
- Sam Etcheverry
- Carl Etelman
- Carlos Etheredge
- Dorian Etheridge
- David Etherly
- Joe Ethridge
- Ray Ethridge
- LeRoy Etienne
- Travis Etienne
- Trevor Etienne
- Earl Ettenhaus
- Bob Etter
- Don Ettinger
- Darius Eubanks
- John Eubanks
- Hiram Eugene
- Tim Euhus
- Kaleb Eulls
- Akayleb Evans
- Bob Evans
- Bobby Evans
- Byron Evans
- Charlie Evans
- Chris Evans
- Chuck Evans (born 1956)
- Chuck Evans (born 1967)
- Dale Evans
- Darren Evans
- Darrynton Evans
- David Evans
- Demetric Evans
- Dick Evans
- Donald Evans
- Doug Evans
- Earl Evans
- Ethan Evans
- Fred Evans (born 1921)
- Fred Evans (born 1983)
- Greg Evans
- Heath Evans
- Jack Evans
- Jahri Evans
- James Evans
- Jerry Evans
- Jim Evans
- John Evans
- Johnny Evans
- Jon Evans
- Jordan Evans
- Josh Evans (born 1972)
- Josh Evans (born 1991)
- Justin Evans
- Larry Evans
- Lee Evans
- Leomont Evans
- Leon Evans
- Lon Evans
- Marwin Evans
- Mike Evans (born 1946)
- Mike Evans (born 1967)
- Mike Evans (born 1993)
- Mitchell Evans
- Murray Evans
- Norm Evans
- Randall Evans
- Rashaan Evans
- Ray Evans (born 1922)
- Ray Evans (born 1924)
- Reggie Evans
- Russell Evans
- Scott Evans
- Troy Evans
- Vince Evans
- Zach Evans
- Paul Evansen
- Deshazor Everett
- Eric Everett
- Gerald Everett
- Jim Everett
- Kevin Everett
- Major Everett
- Thomas Everett
- Tyler Everett
- Steve Everitt
- William Evers
- Dick Evey
- Quinn Ewers
- Bradie Ewing
- Antone Exum
- Nick Eyre
- Donovan Ezeiruaku
- Liam Ezekiel
- Vilnis Ezerins
- Joshua Ezeudu
- Blake Ezor
- Erik Ezukanma
