= List of NFL players (O) =

This is a list of players who have appeared in at least one regular season or postseason game in the National Football League (NFL), American Football League (AFL), or All-America Football Conference (AAFC) and have a last name that starts with "O". This list is accurate through the end of the 2025 NFL season.

== Oa–Og ==
- Don Oakes
- Anthony Oakley
- Charley Oakley
- Ben Oas
- Bart Oates
- Brad Oates
- Victor Oatis
- Carleton Oats
- Efe Obada
- Ronnie O'Bard
- Vic Obeck
- Dunc Obee
- Terry Obee
- Roman Oben
- Ray Oberbroekling
- Tom Oberg
- Herman O'Berry
- Cyril Obiozor
- Ben Obomanu
- Harry O'Boyle
- Jim Obradovich
- Ed O'Bradovich
- Bill O'Brien
- Con O'Brien
- Dave O'Brien
- Davey O'Brien
- Fran O'Brien
- Gail O'Brien
- Jack O'Brien (born 1899)
- Jack O'Brien (born 1932)
- Jim O'Brien
- Ken O'Brien
- Mike O'Brien
- Mike Obrovac
- Henry Obst
- John O'Callaghan
- Ryan O'Callaghan
- Victor Ochi
- Aidan O'Connell
- Grat O'Connell
- Harry O'Connell
- Jake O'Connell
- Kevin O'Connell
- Milt O'Connell
- Patrick O'Connell
- Tommy O'Connell
- Bill O'Connor
- Bob O'Connor
- Dan O'Connor
- Frank O'Connor
- Pat O'Connor
- Paul O'Connor
- Red O'Connor
- Tom O'Connor
- Steve Octavien
- Dorian O'Daniel
- Don Odegard
- Stu O'Dell
- Mel Odelli
- Curly Oden
- Derrick Oden
- McDonald Oden
- Ifeadi Odenigbo
- Dayo Odeyingbo
- Rees Odhiambo
- Osa Odighizuwa
- Owa Odighizuwa
- Phil Odle
- Antwan Odom
- Chris Odom
- Cliff Odom
- Henry Odom
- Jason Odom
- Joe Odom
- Ricky Odom
- Sammy Joe Odom
- Steve Odom
- Nate Odomes
- Riley Odoms
- Pat O'Donahue
- Carter O'Donnell
- Dick O'Donnell
- Joe O'Donnell
- Neil O'Donnell
- Pat O'Donnell
- Neil O'Donoghue
- Jared Odrick
- Urban Odson
- Thomas Odukoya
- George Odum
- Rome Odunze
- Matt O'Dwyer
- Vern Oech
- John Oehler
- Arnie Oehlrich
- John Oelerich
- John Offerdahl
- Kendrick Office
- Tony Office
- Willie Offord
- A. J. Ofodile
- Dave Ogas
- Emmanuel Ogbah
- Eric Ogbogu
- Amen Ogbongbemiga
- Chris Ogbonnaya
- Otito Ogbonnia
- Cedric Ogbuehi
- Jeff Ogden
- Jonathan Ogden
- Ray Ogden
- Kendall Ogle
- Rick Ogle
- Alfred Oglesby
- Cedric Oglesby
- Evan Oglesby
- Paul Oglesby
- Alec Ogletree
- Andrew Ogletree
- Craig Ogletree
- Kevin Ogletree
- Pat Ogrin
- Dare Ogunbowale
- Adetokunbo Ogundeji
- Larry Ogunjobi
- Adewale Ogunleye

== Oh–Oo ==
- Ifeanyi Ohalete
- Ross O'Hanley
- Shaun O'Hara
- Ed O'Hearn
- Jack O'Hearn
- Michael Oher
- Earl Ohlgren
- Ohmer
- Rich Ohrnberger
- David Ojabo
- Michael Ojemudia
- Quinn Ojinnaka
- Adewale Ojomo
- Moro Ojomo
- John Ojukwu
- Azeez Ojulari
- BJ Ojulari
- Ty Okada
- Alex Okafor
- Frank Okam
- Tony Okanlawon
- Chike Okeafor
- Bobby Okereke
- Earl Okine
- Chukky Okobi
- Steve Okoniewski
- Chig Okonkwo
- Chukwuma Okorafor
- Kenny Okoro
- Ogbonnia Okoronkwo
- Amobi Okoye
- Christian Okoye
- C. J. Okoye
- Sam Okuayinonu
- Jeff Okudah
- Russell Okung
- Julian Okwara
- Romeo Okwara
- Albert Okwuegbunam
- Michael Ola
- Kitan Oladapo
- Oluwafemi Oladejo
- Chris Oladokun
- Cliff Olander
- Deji Olatoye
- Chris Olave
- Jamize Olawale
- Clint Oldenburg
- Bob Olderman
- Doug Oldershaw
- Chris Oldham
- Jim Oldham
- Ray Oldham
- Bill Olds
- Dan O'Leary
- Nick O'Leary
- Stan Olejniczak
- John Olenchalk
- Mitch Olenski
- Dave Olerich
- Aaron Oliker
- Elmer Oliphant
- Mike Oliphant
- Bobby Olive
- Shane Olivea
- Bill Oliver
- Bob Oliver
- Branden Oliver
- Bryce Oliver
- Chip Oliver
- Clancy Oliver
- Collin Oliver
- Darryl Oliver
- Ed Oliver
- Frank Oliver
- Greg Oliver
- Hubie Oliver
- Isaiah Oliver
- Jack Oliver
- Jeff Oliver
- Josh Oliver
- Louis Oliver
- Maurice Oliver
- Melvin Oliver
- Muhammad Oliver
- Paul Oliver
- Vince Oliver
- Winslow Oliver
- Brock Olivo
- Neal Olkewicz
- Qadree Ollison
- Charlie Olmstead
- Sewo Olonilua
- Jerry Olsavsky
- Eric Olsen
- Greg Olsen
- Hans Olsen
- Merlin Olsen
- Norm Olsen
- Orrin Olsen
- Phil Olsen
- Ralph Olsen
- Seth Olsen
- Igor Olshansky
- Benji Olson
- Carl Olson
- Erik Olson
- Forrest Olson
- Glenn Olson
- Harold Olson
- Larry Olsonoski
- Lance Olssen
- Les Olsson
- Al Olszewski
- Gunner Olszewski
- Johnny Olszewski
- Russ Oltz
- Segun Olubi
- Donovan Olumba
- Foyesade Oluokun
- Olusegun Oluwatimi
- Jim O'Mahoney
- Jim O'Malley
- Joe O'Malley
- Ryan O'Malley
- Tom O'Malley
- Patrick Omameh
- Charles Omenihu
- Omensky
- Frank Omiyale
- Xavier Omon
- Kenny Onatolu
- Andre O'Neal
- Brian O'Neal
- Calvin O'Neal
- Deltha O'Neal
- Jim O'Neal
- Ken O'Neal
- Leslie O'Neal
- Oren O'Neal
- Raiqwon O'Neal
- Robert O'Neal
- Steve O'Neal
- Bob O'Neil
- Chuck O'Neil
- Ed O'Neil
- Keith O'Neil
- Red O'Neil
- Bill O'Neill
- Brian O'Neill
- Kevin O'Neill
- Pat O'Neill
- Tip O'Neill
- Wally O'Neill
- Larry Onesti
- Dennis Onkotz
- Fendi Onobun
- Bob Ontko
- Josh Onujiogu
- Michael Onwenu
- James Onwualu
- Patrick Onwuasor
- Levi Onwuzurike
- David Onyemata

== Op–Oz ==
- Ed Opalewski
- Sua Opeta
- Dave Opfar
- Jim Opperman
- Toben Opurum
- Red O'Quinn
- Brian Orakpo
- Nate Orchard
- Joe Orduna
- Ruke Orhorhoro
- Frank Ori
- Mike Oriard
- Bob Oristaglio
- Anfernee Orji
- Bo Orlando
- Dan Orlich
- Dan Orlovsky
- Elliott Ormsbee
- Fred Orns
- Tom Orosz
- Charlie O'Rourke
- Chris Orr
- Jimmy Orr
- Kareem Orr
- Leon Orr
- Raheem Orr
- Shantee Orr
- Terry Orr
- Zach Orr
- Buck Ortega
- Ralph Ortega
- Keith Ortego
- Henry Orth
- Ricky Ortiz
- Chuck Ortmann
- Greg Orton
- Kyle Orton
- Amani Oruwariye
- Herb Orvis
- Ossie Orwoll
- Matthew Orzech
- Dave Osborn
- Duke Osborn
- K.J. Osborn
- Mike Osborn
- Chuck Osborne
- Clancy Osborne
- Eldonta Osborne
- Jim Osborne
- Richard Osborne
- Tom Osborne
- Vince Osby
- Kelechi Osemele
- Kassim Osgood
- James O'Shaughnessy
- Terry O'Shea
- Babatunde Oshinowo
- Willie Oshodin
- Sandy Osiecki
- Craig Osika
- Willie Osley
- Bill Osmanski
- Joe Osmanski
- Joseph Ossai
- Ted Ossowski
- Dwayne O'Steen
- Jim Ostendarp
- Joe Ostman
- Jerry Ostroski
- Chet Ostrowski
- Phil Ostrowski
- Dennis O'Sullivan
- J. T. O'Sullivan
- Paul Oswald
- Brock Osweiler
- Jeff Otah
- Jim Otis
- Esezi Otomewo
- Bill O'Toole
- Connor O'Toole
- Tyler Ott
- Lowell Otte
- Dick Ottele
- Brad Ottis
- Bo Otto
- Bob Otto
- Gus Otto
- Jim Otto
- Mike Otto
- Cade Otton
- Louis Oubre
- Greg Ours
- Wes Ours
- John Outlaw
- Robbie Ouzts
- Jeff Overbaugh
- Chad Overhauser
- Bill Overmyer
- DeMarvion Overshown
- David Overstreet
- Will Overstreet
- Don Overton
- Jerry Overton
- Matt Overton
- Odafe Oweh
- Al Owen
- Bill Owen
- Coleman Owen
- Steve Owen
- Tom Owen
- Artie Owens
- Billy Owens
- Brig Owens
- Burgess Owens
- Chad Owens
- Chris Owens
- Dan Owens
- Darrick Owens
- Dennis Owens
- Don Owens
- Gervarrius Owens
- Ike Owens
- James Owens
- Jeff Owens
- Jim Owens
- Joe Owens
- John Owens
- Jonathan Owens
- Luke Owens
- Marv Owens
- Mel Owens
- Montell Owens
- Morris Owens
- Pete Owens
- R. C. Owens
- Rich Owens
- Richard Owens
- Rip Owens
- Steve Owens
- Terrell Owens
- Terry Owens
- Tinker Owens
- Tyler Owens
- Chris Owusu
- Akwasi Owusu-Ansah
- Jeremiah Owusu-Koramoah
- Ken Oxendine
- Mike Ozdowski
- Devine Ozigbo
- Cheta Ozougwu
