= List of NFL players (U–V) =

This is a list of players who have appeared in at least one regular season or postseason game in the National Football League (NFL), American Football League (AFL) , or All-America Football Conference (AAFC) and have a last name that starts with "U" or "V". This list is accurate through the end of the 2025 NFL season.

== U ==
- Josh Uche
- Mitchell Ucovich
- Kenechi Udeze
- Oli Udoh
- Keith Uecker
- Tony Ugoh
- Rocky Uguccioni
- Jeff Uhlenhake
- Steve Uhrinyak
- George Uko
- Isaac Ukwu
- Jeff Ulbrich
- Ed Ulinski
- Harry Ulinski
- Jiggs Ullery
- Artie Ulmer
- Mike Ulmer
- Edefuan Ulofoshio
- Chuck Ulrich
- Hub Ulrich
- Matt Ulrich
- Mike Ulufale
- Princely Umanmielen
- Osi Umenyiora
- Frank Umont
- Rich Umphrey
- Mason Unck
- Brandon Underwood
- Dimitrius Underwood
- Jack Underwood
- John Underwood
- Marviel Underwood
- Olen Underwood
- Tiquan Underwood
- Wayne Underwood
- J. J. Unga
- Uani 'Unga
- Max Unger
- Joe Ungerer
- Johnny Unitas
- Pong Unitas
- Mitch Unrein
- Terry Unrein
- Morris Unutoa
- Eric Unverzagt
- Rick Upchurch
- Tuufuli Uperesa
- Courtney Upshaw
- Gene Upshaw
- Marvin Upshaw
- Regan Upshaw
- Andy Uram
- Alex Urban
- Brent Urban
- Gasper Urban
- Jerheme Urban
- Luke Urban
- Jim Urbanek
- Kraig Urbik
- Scott Urch
- Emil Uremovich
- Herm Urenda
- Brian Urlacher
- John Urschel
- Rube Ursella
- John Ursua
- Darryl Usher
- Eddie Usher
- Lou Usher
- Ben Utecht
- Mike Utley
- Ben Utt
- Iheanyi Uwaezuoke
- Eyioma Uwazurike
- Walt Uzdavinis
- C. J. Uzomah

== Va ==
- Sam Vacanti
- Kenny Vaccaro
- Ted Vactor
- Destiny Vaeao
- Pete Vainowski
- Dominic Vairo
- Halapoulivaati Vaitai
- Sione Vaki
- Marquez Valdes-Scantling
- Vern Valdez
- Carrington Valentine
- Ira Valentine
- Vincent Valentine
- Zack Valentine
- Joe Valerio
- Xazavian Valladay
- Tanner Vallejo
- Hakeem Valles
- Emilio Vallez
- Jeremiah Valoaga
- Steve Vallos
- Norm Van Brocklin
- Courtney Van Buren
- Ebert Van Buren
- Steve Van Buren
- Eric Vance
- Greedy Vance Jr.
- Joe Vance
- Ryan Van Demark
- Kyle Vanden Bosch
- Matt Vanderbeek
- Skip Vanderbundt
- Eddie Vanderdoes
- Leighton Vander Esch
- Mike Vanderjagt
- Ron Vander Kelen
- Jason Vander Laan
- Viv Vanderloo
- Mark Vander Poel
- Phil Vandersea
- Julian Vandervelde
- Al Vandeweghe
- Randy Van Divier
- Bob Van Doren
- Bob Van Duyne
- Alex Van Dyke
- Bruce Van Dyke
- DeMarcus Van Dyke
- Jimmy Van Dyke
- Ralph Van Dyke
- Chase Van Dyne
- Mark van Eeghen
- Hal Van Every
- Tim Van Galder
- Andrew Van Ginkel
- Billy Van Heusen
- Charlie Van Horn
- Doug Van Horn
- Keith Van Horne
- Sean Vanhorse
- Cole Van Lanen
- Ed Van Meter
- Norwood Vann
- Lukas Van Ness
- Nick Vannett
- Jeff Van Note
- Kyle Van Noy
- Tamarick Vanover
- Vernon Vanoy
- Alex Van Pelt
- Brad Van Pelt
- Bradlee Van Pelt
- Sedrick Van Pran-Granger
- Dick Van Raaphorst
- Jeff Van Raaphorst
- Greg Van Roten
- Clyde Van Sickle
- Ben VanSumeren
- Fred Vant Hull
- Art Van Tone
- Pete Van Valkenberg
- Zach VanValkenburg
- Jim Van Wagner
- Fred Vanzo
- Mike Varajon
- Tommy Vardell
- Johnny Vardian
- Tyler Varga
- Larry Vargo
- Frank Varrichione
- Mike Varty
- Nathan Vasher
- Vic Vasicek
- Louis Vasquez
- Roy Vassau
- Arunas Vasys
- Randy Vataha
- Charles Vatterott
- Harp Vaughan
- Josh Vaughan
- Pug Vaughan
- Ruben Vaughan
- Bill Vaughn
- Bob Vaughn
- Cassius Vaughn
- Chip Vaughn
- Clarence Vaughn
- Darrick Vaughn
- Deuce Vaughn
- Jon Vaughn
- Ke'Shawn Vaughn
- Khaleed Vaughn
- Tom Vaughn
- Zemaiah Vaughn
- Ted Vaught
- James Vaughters

== Ve–Vu ==
- Vita Vea
- Walt Veach
- Demetrin Veal
- Elton Veals
- Craig Veasey
- Jordan Veasy
- Norton Vedder
- Kaare Vedvik
- Jason Vega
- David Veikune
- Alan Veingrad
- Tony Veland
- Fernando Velasco
- Jared Veldheer
- Matt Veldman
- Devaughn Vele
- John Vella
- Joe Vellano
- Jim Vellone
- Justin Veltung
- Winston Venable
- Raymond Ventrone
- Ross Ventrone
- Fred Venturelli
- Sam Venuto
- Alijah Vera-Tucker
- Ross Verba
- Clarence Verdin
- Jimmy Verdon
- Ed Vereb
- Brock Vereen
- Carl Vereen
- Shane Vereen
- George Vergara
- Chris Verhulst
- Garin Veris
- Alterraun Verner
- Olivier Vernon
- Jason Verrett
- Norm Verry
- Jared Verse
- David Verser
- Mike Verstegen
- Brian Vertefeuille
- Billy Vessels
- John Vesser
- Joe Vetrano
- Jack Vetter
- Roy Vexall
- Walt Vezmar
- David Viaene
- Dick Vick
- Ernie Vick
- Marcus Vick
- Michael Vick
- Roger Vick
- Kendal Vickers
- Kipp Vickers
- Lawrence Vickers
- Lee Vickers
- Kevin Vickerson
- Binjimen Victor
- Josh Victorian
- Gene Vidal
- Kimani Vidal
- Vic Vidoni
- Nick Vigil
- Zach Vigil
- Tommy Vigorito
- Luiji Vilain
- Kindle Vildor
- Danny Villa
- Vince Villanucci
- Alejandro Villanueva
- Danny Villanueva
- Phil Villapiano
- Chris Villarrial
- Jonathan Vilma
- Theophile Viltz
- Adam Vinatieri
- Ralph Vince
- Kary Vincent Jr.
- Keydrick Vincent
- Shawn Vincent
- Ted Vincent
- Troy Vincent
- Scottie Vines
- Darius Vinnett
- Paul Vinnola
- Carson Vinson
- Fernandus Vinson
- Fred Vinson
- Tony Vinson
- Ken Vinyard
- Jalen Virgil
- Lawrence Virgil
- Dee Virgin
- Scott Virkus
- George Visger
- Larry Visnic
- Lionel Vital
- Dan Vitale
- Sandro Vitiello
- Tristan Vizcaino
- Mark Vlasic
- David Vobora
- Joe Vodicka
- Evan Vogds
- Bob Vogel
- Justin Vogel
- Paul Vogel
- Carroll Vogelaar
- Tim Vogler
- Bob Voight
- Mike Voight
- Walter Voight
- Stu Voigt
- Otto Vokaty
- Travis Vokolek
- Billy Volek
- Elmer Volgenau
- Rick Volk
- Jim Vollenweider
- Kurt Vollers
- Sebastian Vollmer
- Billy Volok
- Cordell Volson
- Pete Volz
- Wilbur Volz
- Scott Von der Ahe
- Kimo von Oelhoffen
- Uwe von Schamann
- Andy Von Sonn
- Andrew Vorhees
- Don Vosberg
- Doc Voss
- Lloyd Voss
- Tillie Voss
- Ed Voytek
- Mike Vrabel
- Tyler Vrabel
- Milt Vucinich
- Jeremy Vujnovich
