= Indianapolis Colts all-time roster =

The Indianapolis Colts all-time roster is split by name into the following two lists:

- Indianapolis Colts all-time roster (A–K)
- Indianapolis Colts all-time roster (L–Z)
