= Lists of American football players =

Lists of American football players include:

== Professional ==
- List of NFL players
- List of Pro Football Hall of Fame inductees
- List of American Football League players
- List of All-America Football Conference players
- List of current American Football Conference players
- List of current National Football Conference players
- List of NFL players born outside the United States
- List of National Football League Olympians
- List of NFL players by games played
- List of NFL players with chronic traumatic encephalopathy
- Lists of Pro Bowl players

== Other ==
- List of College Football Hall of Fame inductees (players)
- List of female gridiron football players
- List of gridiron football players who became professional wrestlers
- List of Heisman Trophy winners
- List of NCAA football records
- List of players who have converted from one football code to another

== See also ==
- NCAA Division I FBS field goal leaders
- NCAA Division I FBS passing leaders
- Category:Lists of NFL draftees by college football team
- Category:Lists of college football statistical leaders by team
