= List of NFL players (Y–Z) =

This is a list of players who have appeared in at least one regular season or postseason game in the National Football League (NFL), American Football League (AFL), or All-America Football Conference (AAFC) and have a last name that starts with "Y" or "Z". This list is accurate through the end of the 2025 NFL season.

== Y ==
- Rock Ya-Sin
- Izzy Yablock
- Vinnie Yablonski
- John Yaccino
- Joe Yackanich
- Ray Yagiello
- Ray Yakavonis
- Frank Yokas
- Bashir Yamini
- William Yanchar
- Carlos Yancy
- Marshal Yanda
- David Yankey
- Colson Yankoff
- Ron Yankowski
- Eric Yarber
- Ryan Yarborough
- Eddie Yarbrough
- Jim Yarbrough (born 1946)
- Jim Yarbrough (born 1963)
- George Yarno
- John Yarno
- Tommy Yarr
- Ron Yary
- Billy Yates
- Bob Yates
- Max Yates
- T. J. Yates
- Howie Yeager
- Jim Yeager
- Bill Yearby
- Craig Yeast
- Russ Yeast
- Jeff Yeates
- Will Yeatman
- James Yeats
- Kenny Yeboah
- Phil Yeboah-Kodie
- Don Yeisley
- Deon Yelder
- T. J. Yeldon
- Bill Yelverton
- Dick Yelvington
- Garo Yepremian
- Howard Yerges
- Tom Yewcic
- John Yezerski
- Isaac Yiadom
- Todd Yoder
- Dave Yohn
- Mack Yoho
- John Yonakor
- Wally Yonamine
- Cade York
- Ashton Youboty
- Jim Youel
- Maury Youmans
- Len Younce
- Adrian Young
- Al Young (born 1902)
- Al Young (born 1949)
- Albert Young
- Almon Young
- Andre Young
- Anthony Young
- Ben Young
- Bill Young
- Billy Young
- Bob Young
- Brian Young
- Bryant Young
- Bryce Young
- Buddy Young
- Byron Young (born 1998)
- Byron Young (born 2000)
- Cameron Young
- Charle Young
- Charley Young
- Chase Young
- Chris Young
- Dareke Young
- Darrel Young
- Dave Young
- David Young
- Dick Young
- Duane Young
- Floyd Young
- Fredd Young
- George Young
- Glen Young (born 1960)
- Glen Young (born 1969)
- Glenn Young
- Herm Young
- James Young
- Jim Young
- Joe Young
- Kenny Young
- Kevin Young
- Landon Young
- Lloyd Young
- Lonnie Young
- Lou Young
- Michael Young
- Mike Young
- Mitch Young
- Paul Young
- Randy Young (born 1898)
- Randy Young (born 1954)
- Renard Young
- Rickey Young
- Robert Young
- Rodney Young
- Roy Young
- Roynell Young
- Russ Young
- Ryan Young
- Sam Young (born 1905)
- Sam Young (born 1987)
- Scott Young
- Selvin Young
- Steve Young (born 1953)
- Steve Young (born 1961)
- Tavon Young
- Theo Young
- Titus Young
- Trevon Young
- Tyrone Young
- Usama Young
- Vince Young
- Waddy Young
- Walter Young
- Wilbur Young
- Willie Young (born 1943)
- Willie Young (born 1947)
- Willie Young (born 1985)
- George Youngblood
- Jack Youngblood
- Jim Youngblood
- Kevin Youngblood
- Sid Youngelman
- Tank Younger
- Frank Youngfleish
- Swede Youngstrom
- Christian Yount
- Mike Yount
- Frank Youso
- Dave Yovanovits
- John Yovicsin
- Walt Yowarsky
- John Yurchey
- Ben Yurosek

== Z ==
- Grey Zabel
- Steve Zabel
- Olamide Zaccheaus
- Ken Zachary
- Tony Zackery
- Frank Zadworney
- Paul Zaeske
- Bert Zagers
- Steve Zahursky
- Nick Zakelj
- Ernie Zalejski
- John Zamberlin
- Carl Zander
- Emanuel Zanders
- Mike Zandofsky
- Silvio Zaninelli
- Willie Zapalac
- Bailey Zappe
- Joe Zapustas
- Gust Zarnas
- Carroll Zaruba
- Dave Zastudil
- Rob Zatechka
- Roger Zatkoff
- Godfrey Zaunbrecher
- Chandler Zavala
- Jerry Zawadzkas
- Dave Zawatson
- Tom Zbikowski
- Rich Zecher
- Henry Zehrer
- Eric Zeier
- Dominique Zeigler
- Dusty Zeigler
- Kevin Zeitler
- Mike Zele
- Connie Zelencik
- Frank Zelencik
- Joe Zelenka
- Ray Zellars
- Jerry Zeller
- Joe Zeller
- Peppi Zellner
- Bob Zeman
- Ed Zeman
- Joaquin Zendejas
- Luis Zendejas
- Max Zendejas
- Tony Zendejas
- Zach Zenner
- Coleman Zeno
- Joe Zeno
- Lance Zeno
- Mike Zentic
- Ty Zentner
- Harold Zerbe
- Amos Zereoué
- Anthony Zettel
- Jeff Zgonina
- Frank Ziegler
- Paul Ziegler
- Chris Ziemann
- Lee Ziemba
- Dave Ziff
- Jack Zilly
- Justin Zimmer
- Geno Zimmerlink
- Corl Zimmerman
- Don Zimmerman
- Gary Zimmerman
- Giff Zimmerman
- Jeff Zimmerman
- Roy Zimmerman
- Bob Zimny
- Keith Zinger
- Zak Zinter
- Walt Zirinsky
- Vince Zizak
- Mickey Zofko
- Jon Zogg
- Clyde Zoia
- Scott Zolak
- Carl Zoll
- Dick Zoll
- Marty Zoll
- Eric Zomalt
- Joe Zombek
- Frank Zombo
- Lou Zontini
- John Zook
- Frank Zoppetti
- Mike Zordich
- Chris Zorich
- George Zorich
- Jim Zorn
- Isaiah Zuber
- Vic Zucco
- Greg Zuerlein
- Dave Zuidmulder
- Paul Zukauskas
- Jabari Zuniga
- Charlie Zunker
- Al Zupek
- Jeremy Zuttah
- Merle Zuver
- Tony Zuzzio
- Brandon Zylstra
- Shane Zylstra
- Jim Zyntell
