= San Francisco 49ers all-time roster =

The San Francisco 49ers all-time roster is split by name into the following two lists:

- San Francisco 49ers all-time roster (A–K)
- San Francisco 49ers all-time roster (L–Z)
