= List of NFL players (I) =

This is a list of players who have appeared in at least one regular season or postseason game in the National Football League (NFL), American Football League (AFL), or All-America Football Conference (AAFC) and have a last name that starts with "I". This list is accurate through the end of the 2025 NFL season.

== I ==
- Cosmo Iacavazzi
- Mike Iaquaniello
- Mohamed Ibrahim
- Israel Idonije
- Mekeli Ieremia
- Israel Ifeanyi
- Germain Ifedi
- Noah Igbinoghene
- Floyd Iglehart
- Juaquin Iglesias
- Donald Igwebuike
- Godwin Igwebuike
- Emil Igwenagu
- James Ihedigbo
- Carl Ihenacho
- Duke Ihenacho
- Ben Ijalana
- Siaki Ika
- Gabe Ikard
- Jack Ikegwuonu
- Hank Ilesic
- Ray Ilg
- Mark Ilgenfritz
- Tunch Ilkin
- Ted Illman
- George Iloka
- Roy Ilowit
- Ken Iman
- Martin Imhof
- Tut Imlay
- Richie Incognito
- Thomas Incoom
- Robert Ingalls
- Mark Ingle
- Tanner Ingle
- Tim Inglis
- Alec Ingold
- Brian Ingram
- Byron Ingram
- Clint Ingram
- Darryl Ingram
- Ed Ingram
- Jake Ingram
- Ja'Marcus Ingram
- Johnathan Ingram
- Keaontay Ingram
- Kevin Ingram
- Mark Ingram II
- Mark Ingram Sr.
- Melvin Ingram
- Steve Ingram
- Tyrion Ingram-Dawkins
- Burt Ingwersen
- Dontrelle Inman
- Jerry Inman
- Earl Inmon
- Dou Innocent
- Trevor Insley
- Marne Intrieri
- Junior Ioane
- Matt Ioannidis
- Joey Iosefa
- Andrei Iosivas
- Tony Ippolito
- Darwin Ireland
- Bill Irgens
- David Irons
- Gerald Irons
- Grant Irons
- Paul Irons
- Barlow Irvin
- Bruce Irvin
- Corvey Irvin
- Darrell Irvin
- Ken Irvin
- LeRoy Irvin
- Mark Irvin
- Michael Irvin
- Sedrick Irvin
- Tex Irvin
- Willie Irvin
- Bucky Irving
- David Irving
- Isaiah Irving
- Nate Irving
- Terry Irving
- Don Irwin
- Dutch Irwin
- Heath Irwin
- Jim Irwin
- Tim Irwin
- Trenton Irwin
- Adisa Isaac
- Keenan Isaac
- Ted Isaacson
- Wilmer Isabel
- Andy Isabella
- Sale Isaia
- Cecil Isbell
- Joe Isbell
- John Isenbarger
- Kemal Ishmael
- Danny Isidora
- Keith Ismael
- Qadry Ismail
- Raghib Ismail
- Jasen Isom
- Ray Isom
- Rickey Isom
- Ron Israel
- Steve Israel
- Jabari Issa
- Rod Issac
- Ralph Isselhardt
- Pete Ittersagen
- Jack Itzel
- Mike Iupati
- Duke Iversen
- Eddie Lee Ivery
- D. J. Ivey
- Jared Ivey
- Travis Ivey
- Joey Ivie
- John Ivlow
- Bob Ivory
- Chris Ivory
- Horace Ivory
- Corey Ivy
- Mortty Ivy
- Pop Ivy
- Mark Iwanowski
- Kenny Iwebema
- Prince Charles Iworah
- Brian Iwuh
- Chidi Iwuoma
- Joel Iyiegbuniwe
- Christian Izien
- George Izo
- Larry Izzo
- Ryan Izzo
