= Bob Harrison (defensive back) =

American defensive back

- Harrison in 1962

No. 20
- Position: Defensive back

Personal information
- Born: November 15, 1938 (age 87); St. Louis, Missouri, U.S.

Career information
- High school: Vashon
- College: Ohio (1957–1960)

Career history
- Baltimore Colts (1961); San Diego Chargers (1963)*
- * Offseason or practice squad member only

Robert Harrison (born November 15, 1938) is an American professional defensive back. He played for the Baltimore Colts of the National Football League (NFL).

== Life and career ==
Harrison was born in St. Louis, Missouri. He played high school football at Vashon High School, and graduated in 1957. He then enrolled at Ohio University to play college football for the Ohio Bobcats. He was on the freshman team in 1957, and was a three-year varsity letterman from 1958 to 1960.

In 1961, Harrison became a free agent, and he joined the Baltimore Colts of the National Football League (NFL). He started thirteen games for the team, and played in thirteen games during the 1961 NFL season. On May 1, 1962, he again became a free agent, and he returned to the Baltimore Colts on May 24, 1962, but was released from the team in August 1962. In 1963, he joined the San Diego Chargers of the American Football League (AFL), but was released from the team in August 1963.
