= Arizona Cardinals all-time roster =

The Arizona Cardinals all-time roster is split by name into the following two lists:

- Arizona Cardinals all-time roster (A–Kin)
- Arizona Cardinals all-time roster (Kir–Z)
