= List of NFL players (Q) =

This is a list of players who have appeared in at least one regular season or postseason game in the National Football League (NFL), American Football League (AFL), or All-America Football Conference (AAFC) and have a last name that starts with "Q". This list is accurate through the end of the 2025 NFL season.

== Q ==
- Jerry Quaerna
- Elijah Qualls
- Red Quam
- Bernard Quarles
- Kelcy Quarles
- Shelton Quarles
- Andrew Quarless
- Shaquille Quarterman
- John Quast
- Jess Quatse
- Frank Quayle
- Jeff Queen
- Patrick Queen
- Jeff Query
- David Quessenberry
- Paul Quessenberry
- Scott Quessenberry
- Brian Quick
- Greg Quick
- Jerry Quick
- Mike Quick
- Red Quigley
- Ryan Quigley
- Fred Quillan
- Frank Quillen
- Chuck Quilter
- Glover Quin
- Bill Quinlan
- Skeets Quinlan
- Brady Quinn
- Ivan Quinn
- Jonathan Quinn
- Kelly Quinn
- Marcus Quinn
- Mike Quinn
- Paddy Quinn
- Richard Quinn
- Robert Quinn
- Steve Quinn
- Trey Quinn
- Ed Quirk
- Teagan Quitoriano
- Brent Qvale
