= All-time rosters by defunct NFL franchises =

All-time rosters by defunct NFL franchises is split by name into the following three lists:

- All-time rosters by defunct NFL franchises (Akron Indians/Pros–Cleveland Indians/Bulldogs)
- All-time rosters by defunct NFL franchises (Cleveland Tigers/Indians–Miami Seahawks)
- All-time rosters by defunct NFL franchises (Milwaukee Badgers–Washington Senators)
