= Johnathan Edwards (American football) =

American football player (born 2001)

No. 35 – Indianapolis Colts
- Position: Cornerback
- Roster status: Active

Personal information
- Born: November 16, 2001 (age 25); St. Louis, Missouri, U.S.
- Listed height: 6 ft 1 in (1.85 m)
- Listed weight: 201 lb (91 kg)

Career information
- High school: Parkway North (St. Louis, Missouri)
- College: Indiana State (2021–2023); Tulane (2024)
- NFL draft: 2025: undrafted

Career history
- Indianapolis Colts (2025–present)

Career NFL statistics as of 2025
- Total tackles: 26
- Pass deflections: 3
- Stats at Pro Football Reference

Johnathan Edwards (born November 16, 2001) is an American professional football cornerback for the Indianapolis Colts of the National Football League (NFL). He played college football for the Indiana State Sycamores and Tulane Green Wave.

== Early life ==
Edwards is from St. Louis, Missouri. He attended Parkway North High School where he competed in football and track and field. At Parkway, he played football as both a defensive back and a wide receiver. He was an all-conference selection at both positions. He committed to play college football for the Indiana State Sycamores.

At Indiana State, Edwards recorded 32 tackles and seven pass breakups during the 2021 season. He then had 30 tackles and led the Missouri Valley Football Conference (MVFC) with nine pass breakups in 2022. He recorded 38 tackles, 0.5 tackles-for-loss (TFLs) and five pass breakups for Indiana State as a junior in 2023.

He then transferred to the Tulane Green Wave for his final season of college football in 2024. At Tulane, Edwards posted 24 tackles, one TFL and a pass breakup. In coverage, he allowed only 54% of passes to be completed for an average of only 8.6 yards-per-catch. At the conclusion of his collegiate career, he was invited to the 2025 Senior Bowl.

== Professional career ==
Pre-draft measurables
Height	Weight	Arm length	Hand span	Wingspan	40-yard dash	10-yard split	20-yard split	20-yard shuttle	Three-cone drill	Vertical jump	Broad jump	Bench press
6 ft 0 3/4 in (1.85 m)	201 lb (91 kg)	32 1/4 in (0.82 m)	8 7/8 in (0.23 m)	6 ft 4 7/8 in (1.95 m)	4.42 s	1.59 s	2.59 s	4.41 s	7.00 s	38.5 in (0.98 m)	10 ft 4 in (3.15 m)	13 reps
All values from Pro Day

After going unselected in the 2025 NFL draft, Edwards signed with the Indianapolis Colts as an undrafted free agent, receiving a contract that included $280,000 guaranteed, the sixth-highest among 2025 undrafted players. He was the only undrafted player to make the Colts' 53-man roster for the 2025 season. Edwards saw his first NFL game action on September 14, 2025, against the Denver Broncos. He made his first NFL start at cornerback on October 12 in a Week 6 matchup against the Arizona Cardinals.

On September 14, 2026, Edwards was waived by the Colts. He was re–signed to Indianapolis' practice squad the following day. He was promoted to the active roster on November 16.

== NFL career statistics ==
=== Regular season ===
Year	Team	Games		Tackles					Interceptions						Fumbles				
Year	Team	GP	GS	Cmb	Solo	Ast	Sck	TFL	Int	Yds	Avg	Lng	TD	PD	FF	Fum	FR	Yds	TD
2025	IND	14	5	26	19	7	0.0	0	0	0	0.0	0	0	3	0	0	0	0	0
Career		14	5	26	19	7	0.0	0	0	0	0.0	0	0	3	0	0	0	0	0
