= Carlos Etheredge =

American football player (born 1970)

No. 81, 82
- Position: Tight end

Personal information
- Born: August 10, 1970 (age 56); Albuquerque, New Mexico, U.S.
- Listed height: 6 ft 5 in (1.96 m)
- Listed weight: 236 lb (107 kg)

Career information
- High school: Del Norte (Albuquerque)
- College: Miami (FL)
- NFL draft: 1993: 6th round, 157th overall pick

Career history
- Indianapolis Colts (1993–1994); Jacksonville Jaguars (1995)*; Seattle Seahawks (1996)*; Amsterdam Admirals (1996–1997)
- * Offseason or practice squad member only

Awards and highlights
- National champion (1991)

Career NFL statistics
- Receptions: 1
- Receiving yards: 6
- Return yards: 23
- Stats at Pro Football Reference

Carlos Etheredge (born August 10, 1970) is an American former professional football player who was a tight end in the National Football League (NFL). He played college football for the Miami Hurricanes and was selected by the Indianapolis Colts in the sixth round of the 1993 NFL draft. He played for the Colts in 1994.
