= Mel Embree =

American football player (1927–1996)

Profile
- Position: End

Personal information
- Born: January 6, 1927; Los Angeles, California, U.S.
- Died: August 30, 1996 (aged 69); Los Angeles, California, U.S.
- Listed height: 6 ft 3 in (1.91 m)
- Listed weight: 190 lb (86 kg)

Career information
- High school: John H. Francis Polytechnic
- College: Pepperdine
- NFL draft: 1951: undrafted

Career history
- Calgary Stampeders (1951); Winnipeg Blue Bombers (1952); Baltimore Colts (1953); Chicago Cardinals (1954)

Career NFL statistics
- Receptions: 25
- Receiving yards: 292
- Receiving touchdowns: 1
- Stats at Pro Football Reference

Melvin Belton Embree (January 6, 1927 – August 30, 1996) was a gridiron football end who played in the National Football League (NFL) and the Canadian Football League (CFL). He played college football at Pepperdine.

== College career ==
Embree played football and ran track at Los Angeles City College for one year before transferring to Pepperdine University. Embree was named All-California Collegiate Athletic Association as a senior in 1950.

== Professional career ==
After graduating from Pepperdine, Embree was signed by the Calgary Stampeders of the Canadian Football League (CFL), playing in one game before being released. He was signed by the Winnipeg Blue Bombers, but missed some games due to a contract dispute and finished the season with 16 receptions for 423 yards and seven touchdowns, including five in his first four games. Embree was signed by the newly-formed Baltimore Colts at the end of the season and was a member of the team's inaugural roster. He was waived by the Colts the following season and was claimed by the Chicago Cardinals.
