= Limbo Parks =

American football player (born 1965)

No. 66
- Position: Offensive guard

Personal information
- Born: March 21, 1965 (age 61); Kansas City, Missouri, U.S.
- Listed height: 6 ft 3 in (1.91 m)
- Listed weight: 265 lb (120 kg)

Career information
- High school: Raytown (Raytown, Missouri)
- College: Arkansas
- NFL draft: 1987: undrafted

Career history
- San Francisco 49ers (1987)
- Stats at Pro Football Reference

Lemuel Tyrone "Limbo" Parks (born March 21, 1965) is an American former professional football player who was an offensive guard for the San Francisco 49ers of the National Football League (NFL). He played college football for the Arkansas Razorbacks.

== Early life ==
Parks was born in Kansas City, Missouri. He attended Raytown South High School in Raytown, Missouri.

== College career ==
Parks first played college football at Coffeyville Community College, where he was part of the Red Ravens 1983 National Junior College Athletic Association (NJCAA) National Championship team. In 1984, Parks was named an NJCAA Football All-American.

In 1985, Parks transferred to the University of Arkansas. Parks earned All-SWC honors in 1986.

== Professional career ==
By the beginning of the 1987 NFL season, Parks was working as a Pizza Hut delivery driver. With the majority of NFL players choosing to walk out after the second game of the season, Parks became one of a large number of replacement players, joining the San Francisco 49ers. He made three appearances for the team before the regular players returned for the sixth game. The three games, against the New York Giants, the Atlanta Falcons and the St. Louis Cardinals were all wins.

== Post-professional career ==
As of 2017, Parks was a high school teacher and football coach near his hometown of Kansas City, Missouri.
