= Brian O'Neal =

American football player (born 1970)

No. 31, 26
- Position: Fullback

Personal information
- Born: February 25, 1970 (age 56); Cincinnati, Ohio, U.S.
- Listed height: 6 ft 0 in (1.83 m)
- Listed weight: 233 lb (106 kg)

Career information
- High school: Purcell Marian (Cincinnati)
- College: Penn State
- NFL draft: 1994: undrafted
- Expansion draft: 1995: 19th round, 38th overall pick

Career history
- Philadelphia Eagles (1994); Carolina Panthers (1995)*; San Francisco 49ers (1995); Carolina Panthers (1997)*
- * Offseason or practice squad member only
- Stats at Pro Football Reference

Brian Louis O'Neal (born February 25, 1970) is an American former professional football player who was a fullback in the National Football League (NFL) for the Philadelphia Eagles and San Francisco 49ers. He played college football for the Penn State Nittany Lions.
