= Scott Von der Ahe =

American football player (born 1975)

No. 51
- Position: Linebacker

Personal information
- Born: October 12, 1975 (age 51); Lancaster, California, U.S.
- Listed height: 5 ft 11 in (1.80 m)
- Listed weight: 242 lb (110 kg)

Career information
- High school: Mission Viejo (Mission Viejo, California)
- College: Iowa; Arizona State
- NFL draft: 1997: 6th round, 182nd overall pick

Career history
- Indianapolis Colts (1997)

Career NFL statistics
- Tackles: 16
- Stats at Pro Football Reference

Scott Fraser Von der Ahe (born October 12, 1975) is an American former professional football player who was a linebacker in the National Football League (NFL). After playing college football for the Iowa and Arizona State Sun Devils, he was selected in the sixth round of the 1997 NFL draft with the 182nd overall pick. He played for the Indianapolis Colts in 1997.
