= Dave Yohn =

American football linebacker

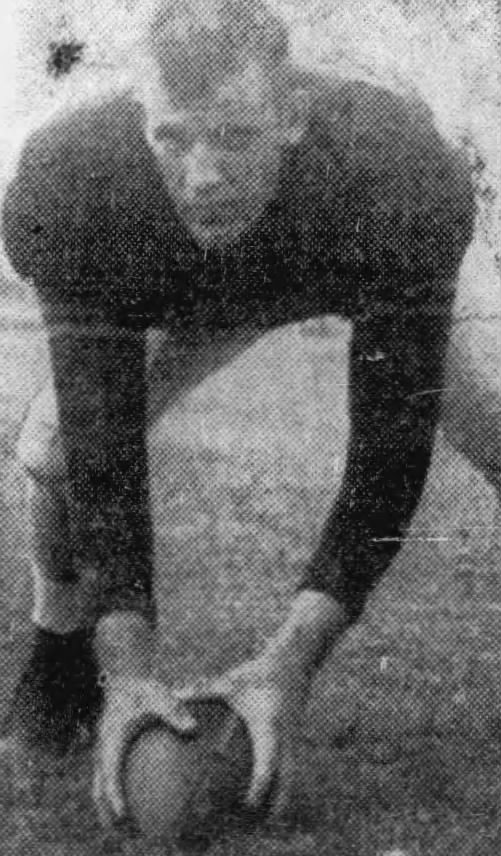
- Yohn in 1958

No. 51, 57
- Position: Linebacker

Personal information
- Born: October 10, 1937; Palmyra, Pennsylvania, U.S.
- Died: December 9, 2002 (aged 65)

Career information
- High school: Palmyra
- College: Gettysburg (1957–1958)

Career history
- Baltimore Colts (1962–1963); New York Jets (1963–1964)
- Stats at Pro Football Reference

John David Yohn (October 10, 1937 – December 9, 2002) was an American professional football linebacker. He played for the Baltimore Colts of the National Football League (NFL), and played for the New York Jets of the American Football League (AFL).

== Life and career ==
Yohn was born in Palmyra, Pennsylvania, and he played shot put at Palmyra High School. He then enrolled at Gettysburg College to play college football for the Gettysburg Bullets, where he played for the team from 1957 to 1958, and was captain in 1958. He served in the United States Marine Corps.

In December 1961, Yohn joined the Baltimore Colts of the National Football League (NFL). He played in four games during the 1962 NFL season, but was released from the team in September 1962. He was activated again in November 1962, but was released again in August 1963. He then joined the New York Jets of the American Football League (AFL), and played in fourteen games during the 1963 AFL season, but was released from the team in August 1964.

Yohn served as head coach of the football team at Middletown High School from 1968 to 1975.

== Death ==
Yohn died on December 9, 2002, at the age of 65.
