= Ruben Vaughan =

American football player (born 1956)

No. 72, 99, 69
- Positions: Defensive tackle, defensive end

Personal information
- Born: August 5, 1956 (age 70); Los Angeles, California, U.S.
- Listed height: 6 ft 2 in (1.88 m)
- Listed weight: 261 lb (118 kg)

Career information
- High school: David Starr Jordan (Los Angeles)
- College: Colorado
- NFL draft: 1979: 6th round, 138th overall pick

Career history
- San Francisco 49ers (1979); Los Angeles Raiders (1982); BC Lions (1983); Minnesota Vikings (1984); Oakland Invaders (1985)

Awards and highlights
- Second-team All-Big Eight (1978)

Career NFL statistics
- Sacks: 4
- Stats at Pro Football Reference

Ruben Vaughan (born August 5, 1956) is an American former professional football player who was a defensive tackle and defensive end in the National Football League (NFL). He played college football for the Colorado Buffaloes. He played in the NFL for the San Francisco 49ers in 1979, Los Angeles Raiders in 1982 and Minnesota Vikings in 1984.
