= Garin Patrick =

American football player (born 1971)

No. 64
- Position: Center

Personal information
- Born: August 31, 1971 (age 55); Canton, Ohio, U.S.
- Listed height: 6 ft 3 in (1.91 m)
- Listed weight: 269 lb (122 kg)

Career information
- High school: Louisville (OH) St. Thomas Aquinas
- College: Louisville
- NFL draft: 1994: undrafted

Career history
- Indianapolis Colts (1994)*; Indianapolis Colts (1995); Miami Dolphins (1996)*; Indianapolis Colts (1997)*; Rhein Fire (1998); Orlando Rage (2001)
- * Offseason or practice squad member only
- Stats at Pro Football Reference

Garin Patrick (born August 31, 1971) is an American former professional football player who was a center for the Indianapolis Colts of the National Football League (NFL) in 1995. He played college football for the Louisville Cardinals. He also played professionally for the Orlando Rage of the XFL in 2001.
