= Daryl Price =

American football player (born 1972)

No. 91, 96
- Position: Defensive end

Personal information
- Born: October 23, 1972 (age 54); Galveston, Texas, U.S.
- Listed height: 6 ft 3 in (1.91 m)
- Listed weight: 274 lb (124 kg)

Career information
- High school: Beaumont (TX) Central
- College: Colorado
- NFL draft: 1996: 4th round, 128th overall pick

Career history
- San Francisco 49ers (1996–1997); Jacksonville Jaguars (1998)*
- * Offseason or practice squad member only
- Stats at Pro Football Reference

Daryl Price (born October 23, 1972) is an American former professional football defensive end. He played in the National Football League (NFL) for the San Francisco 49ers from 1996 to 1997.
