= Hal Puddy =

American football player (1925–1975)

No. 46
- Position: Tackle

Personal information
- Born: August 18, 1925; Hood River, Oregon, U.S.
- Died: January 31, 1975 (aged 49); Port Angeles, Washington, U.S.
- Listed height: 6 ft 4 in (1.93 m)
- Listed weight: 205 lb (93 kg)

Career information
- High school: Hood River
- College: Oregon State
- NFL draft: 1948: undrafted

Career history
- San Francisco 49ers (1948)

Career NFL statistics
- Games: 6
- Stats at Pro Football Reference

Harold Marvin Puddy (August 18, 1925 – January 31, 1975) was an American professional football player who played at the tackle position on both offense and defense. He played college football for Oregon State and professional football for the San Francisco 49ers.

== Early life ==
Puddy was born in 1925 in Hood River, Oregon. He attended Hood River High School.

== College football ==
Puddy played college football for the Oregon State Beavers from 1945 to 1947. He also played as a center for the Oregon State basketball team. He received the U. G. Dubach Award for Citizenship while at Oregon State. He earned a degree in civil engineering from Oregon State.

== Professional football ==
Puddy played professional football in the All-America Football Conference (AAFC) for the San Francisco 49ers during their 1948 season. He appeared in a total of six games for the 49ers. Puddy later recalled his time with the 49ers: "I was a tackle, light but quick. Football was kind of boring, though, because we only worked out for two hours a day."

== Family and later years ==
Puddy was married in 1949. He and his wife had three children.

From 1948 to 1953, Puddy worked as a construction engineer in Oregon. He served as the city engineer of Hood River from 1953 to 1957 and later as the city administrator. He served as the city manager of Bend, Oregon, for nine years from 1962 to 1971. He was hired as the city manager of Port Angeles, Washington, in November 1971.

In January 1975, he died at age 49, from an apparent heart attack after jogging in Port Angeles.
