= Ed Pine =

American football player (1940–2008)

No. 54, 58
- Position: Linebacker

Personal information
- Born: July 13, 1940; Reno, Nevada, U.S.
- Died: August 1, 2008 (aged 68); Reno, Nevada, U.S.
- Listed height: 6 ft 4 in (1.93 m)
- Listed weight: 235 lb (107 kg)

Career information
- High school: Reno
- College: Utah
- NFL draft: 1962: 2nd round, 22nd overall pick
- AFL draft: 1962: 3rd round, 17th overall pick

Career history
- San Francisco 49ers (1962–1964); Pittsburgh Steelers (1965)

Career NFL statistics
- Fumble recoveries: 3
- Interceptions: 3
- Sacks: 3.5
- Stats at Pro Football Reference

Edward Harry Pine Jr. (July 13, 1940 – August 1, 2008) was an American football linebacker who played college football for Utah and professional football in the National Football League (NFL) for the San Francisco 49ers from 1962 to 1964 and for the Pittsburgh Steelers in 1965.

== Early life ==
A native of Reno, Nevada, he was a star athlete at Reno High School, competing in football, basketball, baseball, and track. He played college football at Utah from 1959 to 1961. He was described by the Deseret News in 1961 as "the hottest prospect in Utah football history." At the end of his senior year, he was invited to play in the Shrine Game in San Francisco in December 1961 and the Hula Bowl in January 1962.

== Professional football ==
He was selected by the San Francisco 49ers in the second round (22nd overall pick) of the 1962 NFL draft. He signed with the 49ers in December 1961. He played for the 49ers from 1962 to 1964, appearing in 42 games, 28 of them as a starter.

He also played for the Pittsburgh Steelers in 1965, appearing in eight games for the team.

== Later years ==
Pine died in 2008 in Reno, Nevada, at age 68.
