= Phil Yeboah-Kodie =

American football player (born 1971)

No. 57
- Position: Linebacker

Personal information
- Born: January 22, 1971 (age 55); Ghana
- Listed height: 6 ft 2 in (1.88 m)
- Listed weight: 225 lb (102 kg)

Career information
- College: Penn State
- NFL draft: 1995: 5th round, 146th overall pick
- CFL draft: 1994: 2nd round, 19th overall pick

Career history
- Denver Broncos (1995)*; Washington Redskins (1995); Carolina Panthers (1995); Indianapolis Colts (1996)
- * Offseason or practice squad member only

Awards and highlights
- Second-team All-Big Ten (1994)
- Stats at Pro Football Reference

Phil Anthony Yeboah-Kodie (born January 22, 1971) is a former American football linebacker in the National Football League (NFL) for the Washington Redskins, Carolina Panthers, and Indianapolis Colts. He played college football for the Penn State Nittany Lions football and was selected in the fifth round of the 1995 NFL draft by the Denver Broncos with the 146th overall pick.

Yeboah-Kodie was born in Ghana and grew up in Montreal, Canada.
