= Bob Ontko =

American football player (born 1964)

No. 51
- Position: Linebacker

Personal information
- Born: March 21, 1964 (age 62); Kingston, Pennsylvania, U.S.
- Listed height: 6 ft 3 in (1.91 m)
- Listed weight: 237 lb (108 kg)

Career information
- High school: Wyoming Valley West
- College: Penn State
- NFL draft: 1987: 9th round, 247th overall pick

Career history
- Indianapolis Colts (1987)

Awards and highlights
- National champion (1986)

Career NFL statistics
- Games played: 3
- Games started: 3
- Stats at Pro Football Reference

Robert Paul Ontko (born March 21, 1964) is an American former professional football player who was a linebacker for the Indianapolis Colts of the National Football League (NFL). He played college football for the Penn State Nittany Lions.

Pre-draft measurables
Height	Weight	Arm length	Hand span	40-yard dash	10-yard split	20-yard split	20-yard shuttle	Vertical jump	Broad jump	Bench press
6 ft 3 in (1.91 m)	233 lb (106 kg)	31 in (0.79 m)	8 in (0.20 m)	4.92 s	1.69 s	2.82 s	4.28 s	28.5 in (0.72 m)	9 ft 8 in (2.95 m)	23 reps
All values from NFL Combine
