= Stu O'Dell =

American football player (born 1951)

No. 57, 55
- Position: Linebacker

Personal information
- Born: November 27, 1951 (age 74); Linton, Indiana, U.S.
- Listed height: 6 ft 1 in (1.85 m)
- Listed weight: 220 lb (100 kg)

Career information
- High school: Mooresville (IN)
- College: Indiana
- NFL draft: 1974: 13th round, 332nd overall pick

Career history
- Washington Redskins (1974, 1976–1977); Baltimore Colts (1978)

Career NFL statistics
- Games played: 39
- Fumble recoveries: 2
- Stats at Pro Football Reference

Stewart Harry O'Dell (born November 27, 1951) is an American former professional football player who was a linebacker in the National Football League (NFL) for the Washington Redskins and Baltimore Colts. He played college football for the Indiana Hoosiers and was selected 332nd overall in the 13th round of the 1974 NFL draft. His football career was abruptly interrupted by a serious lower extremity injury.
