= Mike Varajon =

American football player (born 1964)

No. 46, 48
- Position: Running back

Personal information
- Born: July 12, 1964 (age 62); Detroit, Michigan, U.S.
- Listed height: 6 ft 1 in (1.85 m)
- Listed weight: 232 lb (105 kg)

Career information
- High school: Detroit Catholic Central (Novi, Michigan)
- College: Toledo
- NFL draft: 1987: undrafted

Career history
- Tampa Bay Buccaneers (1987)*; San Francisco 49ers (1987); New York Giants (1988)*
- * Offseason or practice squad member only

Career NFL statistics
- Rushing yards: 82
- Rushing average: 4.6
- Receptions: 3
- Receiving yards: 25
- Stats at Pro Football Reference

Michael Joseph Varajon (born July 12, 1964) is an American former professional football player who was a running back for the San Francisco 49ers of the National Football League (NFL). He played college football for the Toledo Rockets. He played with the 49ers as a replacement player during the 1987 NFL strike and also spent time with the Tampa Bay Buccaneers and New York Giants.
