= Andy Ekern =

American football player (born 1961)

No. 79
- Position: Tight end

Personal information
- Born: July 26, 1961 (age 65); Columbia, Missouri, U.S.
- Listed height: 6 ft 6 in (1.98 m)
- Listed weight: 265 lb (120 kg)

Career information
- High school: Mexico (Mexico, Missouri)
- College: Missouri
- NFL draft: 1983: 12th round, 326th overall pick

Career history
- New England Patriots (1983)*; Indianapolis Colts (1984)
- * Offseason or practice squad member only
- Stats at Pro Football Reference

Anderson "Andy" Ekern (born July 26, 1961) is an American former professional football tight end. He played for the Indianapolis Colts in 1984.
