= 1987 Indianapolis Colts season =

35th season in franchise history

- Owner: Robert Irsay
- General manager: Jim Irsay
- Head coach: Ron Meyer
- Offensive coordinator: John Becker
- Defensive coordinator: George Hill
- Home stadium: Hoosier Dome

Results
- Record: 9–6
- Division place: 1st AFC East
- Playoffs: Lost Divisional Playoffs (at Browns) 21–38
- All-Pros: 6: K Dean Biasucci; LB Duane Bickett; RB Eric Dickerson; C Ray Donaldson; OT Chris Hinton; OG Ron Solt
- Pro Bowlers: 6: K Dean Biasucci; LB Duane Bickett; RB Eric Dickerson; C Ray Donaldson; OT Chris Hinton; OG Ron Solt

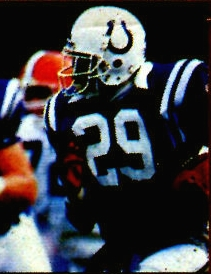
Eric Dickerson rushing the ball during an away game against the Cleveland Browns in 1987.

The 1987 Indianapolis Colts season was the 35th season for the team in the National Football League (NFL) and fourth in Indianapolis. It was also their first full season under head coach Ron Meyer, who had taken over a 0–13 Colts team the previous season after Rod Dowhower was fired.

The team finished the strike-shortened season with a record of 9–6 and won the AFC East division.

This season marked the first winning season, division championship, and playoff appearance for the Colts since 1977, when they were still in Baltimore. They also possessed the league's number one defense, surrendering only 238 points. It was their first season they had the NFL's top defense since 1968.

NFL Films produced a documentary about the team's season entitled Off and Running; it was narrated by Jeff Kaye.

== Offseason ==
=== NFL draft ===
1987 Indianapolis Colts Draft
Round	Selection	Player	Position	College
1	2	Cornelius Bennett	LB	Alabama
2	30	Choice to Washington		
3	58	Chris Gambol	OG	Iowa
4	85	Randy Dixon	OG	Pittsburgh
5	114	Roy Banks	WR	Eastern Illinois
6	142	Freddie Robinson	DB	Alabama
7	170	Mark Bellini	WR	Brigham Young
8	197	Choice to Tampa Bay		
8	200 (Choice from Buffalo)	Chuckie Miller	DB	UCLA
9	225	Choice to N.Y. Giants		
9	247 (Choice from Cleveland)	Bob Ontko	LB	Penn State
10	253	Chris Goode	DB	Alabama
11	281	Jim Reynosa	DE	Arizona State
12	309	David Adams	RB	Arizona

== Personnel ==
=== Front Office / Coaches ===
1987 Indianapolis Colts staff
Front office: President/treasurer – Robert Irsay; Vice president/general manager – Jim Irsay; Assistant general manager – Bob Terpening; Director of player personnel – Jack Bushofsky; Head coaches: Head coach – Ron Meyer; Assistant Head Coach / Offensive Line - Tom Lovat; Offensive coaches: Offensive coordinator – John Becker; Running backs – Leon Burtnett; Receivers – Chip Myers; Offensive assistant / Research and Development – Greg Briner	Defensive coaches: Defensive coordinator – George Hill; Defensive Line - John Marshall; Linebackers – Rick Venturi; Secondary – George Catavolos; Special teams coaches: Special teams / Assistant Offensive Line – Brad Seely; Strength and conditioning: Strength and conditioning – Tom Zupancic

=== NFL replacement players ===
After the league decided to use replacement players during the NFLPA strike, the following team was assembled:

1987 Indianapolis Colts replacement roster
Quarterbacks: 5 Blair Kiel QB/P; 7 Gary Hogeboom; 14 Terry Nugent; Running backs: 30 Mel Carver; 36 Chris McLemore; 37 Chuck Banks; 42 Gordon Brown; Jeff Atkins; Wide receivers: 80 Steve Bryant; 80 James Noble; 84 Kelley Johnson; 85 Tim Kearse; 86 Walter Murray; 87 Mark Bellini; Clyde Duncan; Todd Feldman; Tight ends: 81 Joe Jones; 83 Greg Hawthorne; 88 John Brandes; Deron Miller; Mike Russell	Offensive linemen: 60 Mark Boggs; 61 Marsharne Graves; 62 Jeff Criswell; 67 Ron Plantz; 68 Milt Carthens; 69 Sid Abramowitz; 73 Steve Knight; 79 Shawn Heffern; Defensive linemen: 62 Don Thorp; 63 Steve Knight; 65 Jim Merritts; 94 Chris Scott; 94 Scott Kellar; 95 Bob Hamm; 96 Bill Elko; 97 Frank Mattiace; Mark Smythe	Linebackers: 54 Will Benjamin; 52 Ricky Chatman; 56 Ed Grimsley; 92 Jeff Leiding; 51 Bob Ontko; 90 Gary Padjen; 90 Roger Remo; 59 Brad Saar; 57 Brian Bulluck; Defensive backs: 27 Terry Wright; 28 Lee Davis; 29 Jitter Fields; 33 Bryant Jones; 39 Mike Prior; 40 Pat Ballage; 41 John Simmons; 43 Jim Perryman; 45 Craig Curry; Richard Peavy; Special teams: 6 Steve Jordan K; Manny Matsakis K; 5 Craig Colquitt P

=== Final roster ===
1987 Indianapolis Colts roster
Quarterbacks (QB): 7 Gary Hogeboom; 14 Terry Nugent; 13 Sean Salisbury; 10 Jack Trudeau; Running backs (RB): 20 Albert Bentley; 29 Eric Dickerson; 34 George Wonsley; Wide receivers (WR): 86 Roy Banks; 87 Mark Bellini; 85 Matt Bouza; 80 Bill Brooks; 86 Walter Murray; Tight ends (TE): 81 Pat Beach; 84 Mark Boyer; 88 John Brandes; 49 Mike McCloskey	Offensive linemen (OL): 74 Bob Brotzki C; 71 Kevin Call T; 69 Randy Dixon T; 53 Ray Donaldson C; 75 Chris Hinton T; 65 Joel Patten T; 66 Ron Solt G; 64 Ben Utt G; Defensive linemen (DL): 79 Harvey Armstrong DE; 72 Byron Darby NT; 78 Jon Hand DE; 76 Jerome Sally NT; 99 Donnell Thompson DE; 62 Don Thorp DE	Linebackers (LB): 57 Dave Ahrens ILB; 50 Duane Bickett OLB; 98 Johnie Cooks OLB; 51 Kevin Hancock ILB; 58 June James OLB; 55 Barry Krauss ILB; 59 Orlando Lowry OLB; 93 Cliff Odom ILB; Defensive backs (DB): 38 Eugene Daniel CB; 25 Nesby Glasgow SS; 37 Chris Goode CB; 21 John Holt CB; 43 Jim Perryman CB/S; 39 Mike Prior FS; 47 Freddie Robinson FS; 26 Craig Swoope SS; 42 Willie Tullis CB; 27 Terry Wright CB; Special teams (ST): 4 Dean Biasucci K; 3 Rohn Stark P	Reserve: -- Chuck Banks RB (IR); 68 Willie Broughton NT (IR); 31 Leonard Coleman S (IR); 73 Chris Gambol T (IR); 56 Ed Grimsley LB (IR); 94 Scott Kellar NT (IR); 92 Jeff Leiding LB (IR); 32 Randy McMillan RB (PUP); 48 Chuckie Miller CB (IR); 52 Micah Moon LB (IR); 83 Tim Sherwin TE (IR); -- Mark Walczak TE (IR); Rookies in italics

== Preseason ==
=== Schedule ===
Week	Date	Opponent	Result	Record	Venue	Attendance	Recap
1	August 15	at Detroit Lions	W 22–19	1–0	Pontiac Silverdome	45,753	
2	August 22	at Minnesota Vikings	L 19–37	1–1	Hubert H. Humphrey Metrodome	49,304	
3	August 29	Houston Oilers	W 17–6	2–1	Hoosier Dome	51,975	
4	September 5	Tampa Bay Buccaneers	W 23–6	3–1	Hoosier Dome	50,111	

=== Game summaries ===
==== Week P1: at Detroit Lions ====
Preseason Week 1: Indianapolis Colts at Detroit Lions – Game summary

Quarter	1	2	3	4	Total
Colts	3	10	2	7	22
Lions	0	13	6	0	19

at Pontiac Silverdome, Pontiac, Michigan

- Date: August 15
- Game time: 7:00 p.m. EDT
- Game attendance: 45,753
- TV announcers (WTHR): Don Hein (play-by-play) and Darrel Burnett (color commentator)

==== Week P2: at Minnesota Vikings ====
Preseason Week 2: Indianapolis Colts at Minnesota Vikings – Game summary

Quarter	1	2	3	4	Total
Colts	3	10	0	0	13
Vikings	3	17	7	10	37

at Hubert H. Humphrey Metrodome, Minneapolis, Minnesota

- Date: August 22, 1987
- Game time: 7:00 p.m. EDT/6:00 p.m. CDT
- Game attendance: 49,304
- TV announcers (WTHR): Don Hein (play-by-play) and Darrel Burnett (color commentator)

==== Week P3: vs. Houston Oilers ====
Preseason Week 3: Houston Oilers at Indianapolis Colts – Game summary

Quarter	1	2	3	4	Total
Oilers	6	0	0	0	6
Colts	0	3	14	0	17

at Hoosier Dome, Indianapolis, Indiana

- Date: August 29
- Game time: 7:30 p.m. EDT
- Game attendance: 51,975
- TV announcers (WTHR): Don Hein (play-by-play) and Darrel Burnett (color commentator)

==== Week P4: vs. Tampa Bay Buccaneers ====
Preseason Week 4: Tampa Bay Buccaneers at Indianapolis Colts – Game summary

Quarter	1	2	3	4	Total
Buccaneers	6	10	0	0	16
Colts	3	20	0	0	23

at Hoosier Dome, Indianapolis, Indiana

- Date: September 5
- Game time: 7:30 p.m. EDT
- Game attendance: 50,111
- Referee: Ben Dreith
- TV announcers (WTHR): Don Hein (play-by-play) and Darrel Burnett (color commentator)

== Regular season ==
=== Schedule ===
Week	Date	Opponent	Result	Record	Venue	Attendance	Recap
1	September 13	Cincinnati Bengals	**L** 21–23	0–1	Hoosier Dome	59,387	Recap
2	September 20, 1987	**Miami Dolphins**	**L** 10–23	0–2	Hoosier Dome	57,524	Recap
3	September 27	at St. Louis Cardinals	**Canceled**	0–2	Busch Stadium		
4	October 4	at **Buffalo Bills**	**W** 47–6	1–2	Rich Stadium	9,860	Recap
5	October 11	**New York Jets**	**W** 6–0	2–2	Hoosier Dome	34,927	Recap
6	October 18	at Pittsburgh Steelers	**L** 7–21	2–3	Three Rivers Stadium	34,627	Recap
7	October 25	**New England Patriots**	**W** 30–16	3–3	Hoosier Dome	48,850	Recap
8	November 1	at **New York Jets**	**W** 19–14	4–3	Giants Stadium	60,863	Recap
9	November 8	San Diego Chargers	**L** 13–16	4–4	Hoosier Dome	60,459	Recap
10	November 15	at **Miami Dolphins**	**W** 40–21	5–4	Joe Robbie Stadium	65,433	Recap
11	November 22	at **New England Patriots**	**L** 0–24	5–5	Sullivan Stadium	56,906	Recap
12	November 29	Houston Oilers	**W** 51–27	6–5	Hoosier Dome	54,999	Recap
13	December 6	at Cleveland Browns	**W** 9–7	7–5	Cleveland Stadium	70,661	Recap
14	December 13	**Buffalo Bills**	**L** 3–27	7–6	Hoosier Dome	60,253	Recap
15	December 20	at San Diego Chargers	**W** 20–7	8–6	Jack Murphy Stadium	46,211	Recap
16	December 27	Tampa Bay Buccaneers	**W** 24–6	9–6	Hoosier Dome	60,468	Recap
Note: Intra-division opponents are in **bold** text.

=== Game summaries ===
==== Week 1: vs. Cincinnati Bengals ====
Week 1: Cincinnati Bengals at Indianapolis Colts – Game summary

Quarter	1	2	3	4	Total
**Bengals**	13	0	0	10	**23**
Colts	7	0	7	7	**21**

at Hoosier Dome, Indianapolis, Indiana

- Date: September 13
- Game time: 12:00 p.m. EDT
- Game weather: None (played indoors)
- Game attendance: 59,367
- Referee: Gene Barth
- TV announcers (NBC): Tom Hammond and Dave Casper

Game information

**First quarter**

- CIN – James Brooks 18-yard pass from Boomer Esiason (Jim Breech kick), 6:21. Bengals 7–0. **Drive: 13 plays, 79 yards, 5:43.**
- CIN – Rodney Holman 61-yard pass from Boomer Esiason (kick failed), 3:59. Bengals 13–0. **Drive: 2 plays, 61 yards, 0:48.**
- IND – Bill Brooks 52-yard pass from Jack Trudeau (Dean Biasucci kick), 1:25. Bengals 13–7. **Drive: 5 plays, 68 yards, 2:34.**

**Second quarter**

- No scoring plays

**Third quarter**

- IND – Albert Bentley 2-yard run (Dean Biasucci kick), 2:29. Colts 14–13. **Drive: 13 plays, 80 yards, 7:58.**

**Fourth quarter**

- CIN – Jim Breech 20-yard field goal, 10:36. Bengals 16–14. **Drive: 16 plays, 78 yards, 6:53.**
- CIN – James Brooks 1-yard run (Jim Breech kick), 7:50. Bengals 23–14. **Drive: 3 plays, 25 yards, 1:19.**
- IND – Tim Sherwin 1-yard pass from Jack Trudeau (Dean Biasucci kick), 2:33. Bengals 23–21. **Drive: 9 plays, 70 yards, 5:17.**

**Top passers**

- CIN – Boomer Esiason – 17/26, 236 yards, 2 TD
- IND – Jack Trudeau – 13/23, 206 yards, 2 TD, 3 INT

**Top rushers**

- CIN – James Brooks – 19 rushes, 86 yards, TD
- IND – Albert Bentley – 25 rushes, 77 yards, TD

**Top receivers**

- CIN – Rodney Holman – 3 receptions, 79 yards, TD
- IND – Bill Brooks – 6 receptions, 146 yards, TD

==== Week 2: vs. Miami Dolphins ====
Week 2: Miami Dolphins at Indianapolis Colts – Game summary

Quarter	1	2	3	4	Total
**Dolphins**	7	9	7	0	**23**
Colts	0	7	3	0	**10**

at Hoosier Dome, Indianapolis, Indiana

- Date: September 20
- Game time: 12:00 p.m. EDT
- Game weather: None (Played indoors)
- Game attendance: 57,524
- Referee: Fred Wyant
- TV announcers (NBC): Tom Hammond and Dave Casper

Game information

**First quarter**

- MIA – Troy Stradford 18-yard pass from Dan Marino (Fuad Reveiz kick), 5:37. Dolphins 7–0. **Drive: 11 plays, 81 yards, 5:33.**

**Second quarter**

- MIA – Fuad Reveiz 27-yard field goal, 12:37. Dolphins 10–0. **Drive: 8 plays, 57 yards, 3:43.**
- IND – Matt Bouza 17-yard pass from Gary Hogeboom (Dean Biasucci kick), 6:12. Dolphins 10–7. **Drive: 7 plays, 62 yards, 2:25.**
- MIA – Jim Jensen 6-yard pass from Dan Marino (kick failed), 1:12. Dolphins 16–7. **Drive: 11 plays, 80 yards, 5:00.**

**Third quarter**

- MIA – Mark Clayton 10-yard pass from Dan Marino (Fuad Reveiz kick), 7:19. Dolphins 23–7. **Drive: 8 plays, 60 yards, 3:50.**
- IND – Dean Biasucci 50-yard field goal, 1:32. Dolphins 23–10. **Drive: 7 plays, 30 yards, 3:21.**

**Fourth quarter**

- No scoring plays

**Top passers**

- MIA – Dan Marino – 23/32, 254 yards, 3 TD
- IND – Gary Hogeboom – 27/43, 282 yards, TD, INT

**Top rushers**

- MIA – Lorenzo Hampton – 13 rushes, 44 yards
- IND – Albert Bentley – 22 rushes, 84 yards

**Top receivers**

- MIA – Lorenzo Hampton – 7 receptions, 49 yards
- IND – Albert Bentley – 9 receptions, 69 yards

==== Week 4: at Buffalo Bills ====
Week 4: Indianapolis Colts at Buffalo Bills – Game summary

Quarter	1	2	3	4	Total
**Colts**	7	21	19	0	**47**
Bills	0	0	0	6	**6**

at Rich Stadium, Orchard Park, New York

- Date: October 4
- Game time: 12:00 p.m. EDT
- Game weather: 43 °F (6 °C); relative humidity 62%; wind 13 miles per hour (21 km/h; 11 kn)
- Game attendance: 9,860
- Referee: Dick Hantak
- TV announcers (NBC): Sam Nover (play-by-play) and Dave Casper (color commentator)

Team	Category	Player	Statistics
IND	Passing	Gary Hogeboom	17/25, 259 YDS, 5 TDs
IND	Rushing	Chuck Banks	16 CAR, 69 YDS
IND	Receiving	Walter Murray	7 REC, 161 YDS, 2 TDs
BUF	Passing	Willie Totten	4/12, 71 YDS, 1 TD
BUF	Rushing	Johnny Shepherd	7 CAR, 38 YDS
BUF	Receiving	Sheldon Gaines	6 REC, 98 YDS

Scoring summary

Quarter	Time	Drive			Team	Scoring information	Score	
Quarter	Time	Plays	Yards	TOP	Team	Scoring information	IND	BUF
1	2:48	3	56	0:49	Colts	Murray 37-yard touchdown reception from Hogeboom, Jordan kick good	7	0
2	7:04	7	68	3:05	Colts	Murray 11-yard touchdown reception from Hogeboom, Jordan kick good	14	0
2	1:38	8	71	2:09	Colts	Jones 37-yard touchdown reception from Hogeboom, Jordan kick good	21	0
2	0:18	2	40	0:16	Colts	Jones 18-yard touchdown reception from Hogeboom, Jordan kick good	28	0
3	14:10	2	21	0:36	Colts	Jones 18-yard touchdown reception from Hogeboom, Jordan kick good	35	0
3	12:30	—	—	—	Colts	Clark tackled in the end zone by Leiding for a safety	37	0
3	7:11	10	50	5:07	Colts	36-yard field goal by Jordan	40	0
3	4:50	2	44	0:37	Colts	Brown 18-yard touchdown run, Jordan kick good	47	0
4	8:52	3	12	0:52	Bills	Brown 8-yard touchdown reception from Totten, Schlopy kick no good	47	6
"TOP" = time of possession. For other American football terms, see Glossary of American football.							47	6

==== Week 5: vs. New York Jets ====
Week 5: New York Jets at Indianapolis Colts – Game summary

Quarter	1	2	3	4	Total
Jets	0	0	0	0	**0**
**Colts**	0	3	3	0	**6**

at Hoosier Dome, Indianapolis, Indiana

- Date: October 11
- Game time: 12:00 p.m. EDT
- Game weather: None (played indoors)
- Game attendance: 34,927
- Referee: Pat Haggerty
- TV announcers (NBC): Tom Hammond (play-by-play) and Sam Rutigliano (color commentator)

Team	Category	Player	Statistics
NYJ	Passing	David Norrie	17/35, 163 YDS, 3 INTs
NYJ	Rushing	Dennis Bligen	12 CAR, 35 YDS
NYJ	Receiving	Michael Harper	5 REC, 56 YDS
IND	Passing	Gary Hogeboom	15/28, 115 YDS, 1 TDs
IND	Rushing	Chuck Banks	25 CAR, 159 YDS
IND	Receiving	Chuck Banks	5 REC, 22 YDS

Scoring summary

Quarter	Time	Drive			Team	Scoring information	Score	
Quarter	Time	Plays	Yards	TOP	Team	Scoring information	NYJ	IND
2	1:57	5	36	2:51	Colts	35-yard field goal by Jordan	0	3
3	7:28	12	67	5:51	Colts	25-yard field goal by Jordan	0	6
"TOP" = time of possession. For other American football terms, see Glossary of American football.							0	6

==== Week 6: at Pittsburgh Steelers ====
Week 6: Indianapolis Colts at Pittsburgh Steelers – Game summary

Quarter	1	2	3	4	Total
Colts	0	7	0	0	**7**
**Steelers**	7	0	0	14	**21**

at Three Rivers Stadium, Pittsburgh, Pennsylvania

- Date: October 18
- Game time: 12:00 p.m. EDT
- Game weather: 53 °F (12 °C); relative humidity 62%; wind 6 miles per hour (9.7 km/h; 5.2 kn) (Scattered Clouds)
- Game attendance: 34,627
- Referee: Tom Dooley
- TV announcers (NBC): Tom Hammond (play-by-play) and Sam Rutigliano (color commentator)

Team	Category	Player	Statistics
IND	Passing	Blair Kiel	17/30, 195 YDS, 1 TD, 3 INTs
IND	Rushing	Gordon Brown	9 CAR, 32 YDS
IND	Receiving	Mark Bellini	5 REC, 69 YDS
PIT	Passing	Steve Bono	11/23, 138 YDS, 2 TDs, 1 INT
PIT	Rushing	Earnest Jackson	24 CAR, 134 YDS
PIT	Receiving	John Stallworth	5 REC, 54 YDS, 1 TD

Scoring summary

Quarter	Time	Drive			Team	Scoring information	Score	
Quarter	Time	Plays	Yards	TOP	Team	Scoring information	IND	PIT
1	7:06	2	11	0:42	Steelers	Stallworth 3-yard touchdown reception from Bono, Trout kick good	0	7
2	1:54	6	80	1:06	Colts	Murray 20-yard touchdown reception from Kiel, Jordan kick good	7	7
4	10:01	9	59	5:37	Steelers	Hoge 20-yard touchdown reception from Bono, Trout kick good	7	14
4	3:00	8	38	4:55	Steelers	Sanders 20-yard touchdown run, Trout kick good	7	21
"TOP" = time of possession. For other American football terms, see Glossary of American football.							7	21

==== Week 7: vs. New England Patriots ====
Week 7: New England Patriots at Indianapolis Colts – Game summary

Quarter	1	2	3	4	Total
Patriots	3	3	7	3	**16**
**Colts**	0	10	13	7	**30**

at Hoosier Dome, Indianapolis, Indiana

- Date: October 25
- Game time: 1:00 p.m. EST
- Game weather: None (played indoors)
- Game attendance: 48,850
- Referee: Bob McElwee
- TV announcers (NBC): Kevin Slaten (play-by-play) and Reggie Rucker (color commentator)

Team	Category	Player	Statistics
NE	Passing	Tony Eason	22/42, 246 YDS, 1 TD, 1 INT
NE	Rushing	Mosi Tatupu	12 CAR, 39 YDS
NE	Receiving	Stanley Morgan	7 REC, 102 YDS, 1 TD
IND	Passing	Jack Trudeau	17/28, 239 YDS, 1 TD
IND	Rushing	Albert Bentley	16 CAR, 65 YDS, 1 TD
IND	Receiving	Albert Bentley	4 REC, 53 YDS

Scoring summary

Quarter	Time	Drive			Team	Scoring information	Score	
Quarter	Time	Plays	Yards	TOP	Team	Scoring information	NE	IND
1	5:59	13	52	5:38	Patriots	30-yard field goal by Franklin	3	0
2	7:42	15	72	7:11	Patriots	31-yard field goal by Franklin	6	0
2	1:54	7	71	5:48	Colts	Bouza 25-yard touchdown reception from Trudeau, Biasucci kick good	6	7
2	0:28	6	33	0:46	Colts	48-yard field goal by Biasucci	6	10
3	11:11	9	55	3:49	Colts	38-yard field goal by Biasucci	6	13
3	6:56	6	36	2:36	Colts	24-yard field goal by Biasucci	6	16
3	5:14	—	—	—	Colts	Fumble recovery returned 28 yards for touchdown by Thompson, Biasucci kick good	6	23
3	1:42	9	76	3:32	Patriots	Morgan 17-yard touchdown reception from Eason, Franklin kick good	13	23
4	8:52	9	34	4:37	Patriots	49-yard field goal by Franklin	16	23
4	3:25	4	22	2:14	Colts	Bentley 12-yard touchdown run, Biasucci kick good	16	30
"TOP" = time of possession. For other American football terms, see Glossary of American football.							16	30

==== Week 8: at New York Jets ====
Week 8: Indianapolis Colts at New York Jets – Game summary

Quarter	1	2	3	4	Total
**Colts**	3	7	3	6	**19**
Jets	0	7	0	7	**14**

at Giants Stadium, East Rutherford, New Jersey

- Date: November 1
- Game time: 1:00 p.m. EST
- Game weather: 53 °F (12 °C); relative humidity 62%; wind 9 miles per hour (14 km/h; 7.8 kn)
- Game attendance: 60,863
- Referee: Ben Dreith
- TV announcers (NBC): Marv Albert (play-by-play) and Joe Namath (color commentator)

Team	Category	Player	Statistics
IND	Passing	Jack Trudeau	14/23, 192 YDS, 1 TD
IND	Rushing	Albert Bentley	29 CAR, 145 YDS
IND	Receiving	Pat Beach	4 REC, 31 YDS
NYJ	Passing	Ken O'Brien	15/29, 174 YDS, 1 INT
NYJ	Rushing	Johnny Hector	5 CAR, 37 YDS, 2 TDs
NYJ	Receiving	Al Toon	7 REC, 79 YDS

Scoring summary

Quarter	Time	Drive			Team	Scoring information	Score	
Quarter	Time	Plays	Yards	TOP	Team	Scoring information	IND	NYJ
1	7:56	12	59	7:04	Colts	36-yard field goal by Biasucci	3	0
2	10:23	5	89	2:53	Colts	Bouza 44-yard touchdown reception from Trudeau, Biasucci kick good	10	0
2	2:14	15	80	8:01	Jets	Hector 12-yard touchdown run, Leahy kick good	10	7
3	7:58	4	4	2:43	Colts	44-yard field goal by Biasucci	13	7
4	14:56	11	30	7:00	Colts	38-yard field goal by Biasucci	16	7
4	9:21	9	28	4:45	Colts	33-yard field goal by Biasucci	19	7
4	6:30	7	69	2:51	Jets	Hector 20-yard touchdown run, Leahy kick good	19	14
"TOP" = time of possession. For other American football terms, see Glossary of American football.							19	14

On October 31, the Los Angeles Rams traded Eric Dickerson to the Indianapolis Colts in a three team trade involving the Buffalo Bills. The Rams sent Dickerson to the Colts for six draft choices and two players. Buffalo obtained the rights to Cornelius Bennett from Indianapolis. Buffalo sent running back Greg Bell and three draft choices to the Rams, while Indianapolis added Owen Gill and three of their own draft picks to complete the deal with the Rams.

==== Week 9: vs. San Diego Chargers ====
Week 9: San Diego Chargers at Indianapolis Colts – Game summary

Quarter	1	2	3	4	Total
**Chargers**	0	0	6	10	**16**
Colts	3	10	0	0	**13**

at Hoosier Dome, Indianapolis, Indiana

- Date: November 8
- Game time: 1:00 p.m. EST
- Game weather: None (played indoors)
- Game attendance: 54,009
- Referee: Jerry Markbreit
- TV announcers (NBC): Marv Albert (play-by-play) and Joe Namath (color commentator)

Team	Category	Player	Statistics
SD	Passing	Dan Fouts	16/30, 214 YDS, 1 TD, 3 INTs
SD	Rushing	Curtis Adams	13 CAR, 52 YDS
SD	Receiving	Wes Chandler	4 REC, 73 YDS
IND	Passing	Jack Trudeau	12/18, 127 YDS
IND	Rushing	Eric Dickerson	35 CAR, 138 YDS
IND	Receiving	Matt Bouza	3 REC, 53 YDS

Scoring summary

Quarter	Time	Drive			Team	Scoring information	Score	
Quarter	Time	Plays	Yards	TOP	Team	Scoring information	SD	IND
1	6:26	16	59	8:34	Colts	37-yard field goal by Biasucci	0	3
2	10:39	4	5	1:31	Colts	27-yard field goal by Biasucci	0	6
2	0:55	13	80	6:28	Colts	Bentley 8-yard touchdown run, Biasucci kick good	0	13
3	11:04	10	55	3:56	Chargers	42-yard field goal by Abbott	3	13
3	3:12	6	21	2:43	Chargers	37-yard field goal by Abbott	6	13
4	12:47	7	47	2:55	Chargers	James 5-yard touchdown reception from Fouts, Abbott kick good	13	13
4	0:12	11	59	3:54	Chargers	39-yard field goal by Abbott	16	13
"TOP" = time of possession. For other American football terms, see Glossary of American football.							16	13

==== Week 10: at Miami Dolphins ====
Week 10: Indianapolis Colts at Miami Dolphins – Game summary

Quarter	1	2	3	4	Total
**Colts**	7	13	3	17	**40**
Dolphins	14	7	0	0	**21**

at Joe Robbie Stadium, Miami Gardens, Florida

- Date: November 15
- Game time: 1:00 p.m. EST
- Game weather: 77 °F (25 °C); relative humidity 76%; wind 14 miles per hour (23 km/h; 12 kn) (Scattered Clouds)
- Game attendance: 65,433
- Referee: Jim Tunney
- TV announcers (NBC): Dick Enberg (play-by-play) and Merlin Olsen (color commentator)

Team	Category	Player	Statistics
IND	Passing	Gary Hogeboom	22/37, 218 YDS, 1 TD
IND	Rushing	Eric Dickerson	30 CAR, 154 YDS, 1 TD
IND	Receiving	Matt Bouza	5 REC, 61 YDS
MIA	Passing	Dan Marino	14/34, 194 YDS, 2 TDs, 1 INT
MIA	Rushing	Troy Stradford	8 CAR, 28 YDS
MIA	Receiving	Tony Nathan	4 REC, 31 YDS

Scoring summary

Quarter	Time	Drive			Team	Scoring information	Score	
Quarter	Time	Plays	Yards	TOP	Team	Scoring information	IND	MIA
1	12:07	4	57	1:03	Dolphins	Hampton 6-yard touchdown run, Reveiz kick good	0	7
1	5:08	9	62	4:32	Dolphins	Johnson 4-yard touchdown reception from Marino, Reveiz kick good	0	14
1	0:56	10	77	4:12	Colts	Dickerson 4-yard touchdown run, Biasucci kick good	7	14
2	14:11	2	27	0:49	Colts	Brooks 7-yard touchdown reception from Hogeboom, Biasucci kick good	14	14
2	5:19	6	20	1:47	Colts	22-yard field goal by Biasucci	17	14
2	0:48	10	81	3:31	Dolphins	Banks 10-yard touchdown reception from Marino, Reveiz kick good	17	21
2	0:00	5	39	0:48	Colts	32-yard field goal by Biasucci	20	21
3	1:12	19	90	8:36	Colts	25-yard field goal by Biasucci	23	21
4	9:22	13	60	5:38	Colts	23-yard field goal by Biasucci	26	21
4	3:36	8	55	3:41	Colts	Bentley 17-yard touchdown run, Biasucci kick good	33	21
4	1:03	6	26	1:58	Colts	Bentley 2-yard touchdown run, Biasucci kick good	40	21
"TOP" = time of possession. For other American football terms, see Glossary of American football.							40	21

==== Week 11: at New England Patriots ====
Week 11: Indianapolis Colts at New England Patriots – Game summary

Quarter	1	2	3	4	Total
Colts	0	0	0	0	**0**
**Patriots**	0	10	14	0	**24**

at Sullivan Stadium, Foxborough, Massachusetts

- Date: November 22
- Game time: 1:00 p.m. EST
- Game weather: 24 °F (−4 °C); relative humidity 44%; wind 33 miles per hour (53 km/h; 29 kn); wind chill 9 °F (−13 °C) (Sunny)
- Game attendance: 56,906
- Referee: Gordon McCarter
- TV announcers (NBC): Don Criqui (play-by-play) and Bob Trumpy (color commentator)

Team	Category	Player	Statistics
IND	Passing	Gary Hogeboom	10/20, 122 YDS, 3 INTs
IND	Rushing	Eric Dickerson	27 CAR, 117 YDS
IND	Receiving	Bill Brooks	5 REC, 72 YDS
NE	Passing	Tom Ramsey	12/26, 183 YDS, 1 TD
NE	Rushing	Bob Perryman	10 CAR, 73 YDS
NE	Receiving	Stanley Morgan	5 REC, 102 YDS

Scoring summary

Quarter	Time	Drive			Team	Scoring information	Score	
Quarter	Time	Plays	Yards	TOP	Team	Scoring information	IND	NE
2	14:56	9	82	3:53	Patriots	Fryar 8-yard touchdown reception from Ramsey, Franklin kick good	0	7
2	1:08	5	24	0:40	Patriots	34-yard field goal by Franklin	0	10
3	9:16	—	—	—	Patriots	Scott returned blocked punt 3 yards for a touchdown, Franklin kick good	0	17
3	2:32	—	—	—	Patriots	Interception returned 45 yards for touchdown by Lippett, Franklin kick good	0	24
"TOP" = time of possession. For other American football terms, see Glossary of American football.							0	24

==== Week 12: vs. Houston Oilers ====
Week 12: Houston Oilers at Indianapolis Colts – Game summary

Quarter	1	2	3	4	Total
Oilers	0	10	7	10	**27**
**Colts**	7	21	3	20	**51**

at Hoosier Dome, Indianapolis, Indiana

- Date: November 29
- Game time: 1:00 p.m. EST
- Game weather: None (played indoors)
- Game attendance: 54,009
- Referee: Bob Frederic
- TV announcers (NBC): Tom Hammond (play-by-play) and Michael Jackson (color commentator)

Team	Category	Player	Statistics
HOU	Passing	Warren Moon	24/44, 327 YDS, 3 TDs, 2 INTs
HOU	Rushing	Mike Rozier	26 CAR, 122 YDS
HOU	Receiving	Drew Hill	7 REC, 134 YDS, 2 TDs
IND	Passing	Gary Hogeboom	8/15, 149 YDS, 1 TD
IND	Rushing	Eric Dickerson	27 CAR, 136 YDS, 2 TDs
IND	Receiving	Matt Bouza	3 REC, 29 YDS, 1 TD

Scoring summary

Quarter	Time	Drive			Team	Scoring information	Score	
Quarter	Time	Plays	Yards	TOP	Team	Scoring information	HOU	IND
1	11:07	9	82	3:53	Colts	Dickerson 19-yard touchdown run, Biasucci kick good	0	7
2	14:54	10	41	4:27	Oilers	28-yard field goal by Zendejas	3	7
2	13:21	3	76	1:33	Colts	Bentley 72-yard touchdown reception from Hogeboom, Biasucci kick good	3	14
2	12:19	2	27	0:51	Colts	Dickerson 13-yard touchdown run, Biasucci kick good	3	21
2	5:41	8	85	4:38	Oilers	Hill 7-yard touchdown reception from Moon, Zendejas kick good	10	21
2	0:10	5	68	0:34	Colts	Bentley 22-yard touchdown reception from Hogeboom, Biasucci kick good	10	28
3	9:39	8	30	4:18	Colts	36-yard field goal by Biasucci	10	31
3	2:27	15	80	7:12	Oilers	Williams 7-yard touchdown reception from Moon, Zendejas kick good	17	31
4	13:22	4	-3	1:55	Oilers	44-yard field goal by Zendejas	20	31
4	5:50	4	38	2:14	Colts	Bouza 4-yard touchdown reception from Trudeau, Biasucci kick good	20	41
4	4:48	4	83	1:46	Oilers	Hill 40-yard touchdown reception from Moon, Zendejas kick good	27	41
4	9:05	4	3	1:52	Colts	45-yard field goal by Biasucci	20	34
4	1:56	7	17	2:52	Colts	49-yard field goal by Biasucci	27	44
4	0:06	3	11	1:27	Colts	Wonsley 2-yard touchdown run, Biasucci kick good	27	51
"TOP" = time of possession. For other American football terms, see Glossary of American football.							27	51

==== Week 13: at Cleveland Browns ====
Week 13: Indianapolis Colts at Cleveland Browns – Game summary

Quarter	1	2	3	4	Total
**Colts** (7–5)	0	9	0	0	**9**
Browns (7–5)	0	0	7	0	**7**

at Cleveland Stadium • Cleveland, Ohio

- Date: December 6, 1987
- Game time: 1:00 p.m. EST
- Game weather: 32 °F (0 °C); relative humidity 74%; wind 7 miles per hour (11 km/h; 6.1 kn); wind chill 26 °F (−3 °C)
- Game attendance: 70,661
- Referee: Dick Jorgensen
- TV announcers (NBC): Charlie Jones (play-by-play) and Jimmy Cefalo (color commentator)

Team	Category	Player	Statistics
IND	Passing	Jack Trudeau	20/34, 192 YDS
IND	Rushing	Eric Dickerson	27 CAR, 98 YDS
IND	Receiving	Bill Brooks	7 REC, 85 YDS
CLE	Passing	Bernie Kosar	16/35, 178 YDS, 1 TD
CLE	Rushing	Kevin Mack	16 CAR, 61 YDS
CLE	Receiving	Webster Slaughter	4 REC, 56 YDS

Scoring summary

Quarter	Time	Drive			Team	Scoring information	Score	
Quarter	Time	Plays	Yards	TOP	Team	Scoring information	IND	CLE
2	8:44	5	21	1:53	Colts	33-yard field goal by Biasucci	3	0
2	4:00	7	44	3:39	Colts	37-yard field goal by Biasucci	6	0
2	0:09	10	62	1:55	Colts	41-yard field goal by Biasucci	9	0
3	3:38	5	36	3:08	Browns	Brennan 19-yard touchdown reception from Kosar, Jaeger kick good	9	7
"TOP" = time of possession. For other American football terms, see Glossary of American football.							9	7

- Point spread:
- Over/under:
- Time of game:

Colts	Game Statistics	Browns
18	First downs	15
30–114	Rushes–yards	26–87
192	Passing yards	178
20–34–0	Passes	16–35–0
1–9	Sacked–yards	3–18
183	Net passing yards	160
297	Total yards	247
48	Return yards	84
8–33.9	Punts	8–32.5
1–1	Fumbles–lost	2–1
3–20	Penalties–yards	4–20
30:42	Time of possession	29:18

==== Week 14: vs. Buffalo Bills ====
Week 14: Buffalo Bills at Indianapolis Colts – Game summary

Quarter	1	2	3	4	Total
**Bills**	7	6	0	14	**27**
Colts	0	3	0	0	**3**

at Hoosier Dome, Indianapolis, Indiana

- Date: December 13
- Game time: 1:00 p.m. EST
- Game weather: None (played indoors)
- Game attendance: 60,253
- Referee: Pat Haggerty
- TV announcers (NBC): Tom Hammond (play-by-play) and Dave Lapham (color commentator)

Team	Category	Player	Statistics
BUF	Passing	Jim Kelly	18/34, 167 YDS, 2 TDs
BUF	Rushing	Ronnie Harmon	18 CAR, 85 YDS
BUF	Receiving	Chris Burkett	4 REC, 62 YDS
IND	Passing	Jack Trudeau	6/15, 78 YDS, 2 INTs
IND	Rushing	Eric Dickerson	11 CAR, 19 YDS
IND	Receiving	Bill Brooks	5 REC, 55 YDS

Scoring summary

Quarter	Time	Drive			Team	Scoring information	Score	
Quarter	Time	Plays	Yards	TOP	Team	Scoring information	BUF	IND
1	7:49	13	75	7:11	Bills	Harmon 12-yard touchdown reception from Kelly, Norwood kick good	7	0
2	13:43	6	25	1:48	Bills	39-yard field goal by Norwood	7	3
2	8:07	4	9	1:43	Colts	30-yard field goal by Biasucci	10	3
2	1:57	13	69	6:10	Bills	25-yard field goal by Norwood	13	3
4	9:38	11	56	5:08	Bills	Johnson 8-yard touchdown reception from Kelly, Norwood kick good	20	3
4	1:11	—	—	—	Bills	Fumble recovery returned 0 yards for touchdown by Smith, Norwood kick good	27	3
"TOP" = time of possession. For other American football terms, see Glossary of American football.							27	3

==== Week 15: at San Diego Chargers ====
Week 15: Indianapolis Colts at San Diego Chargers – Game summary

Quarter	1	2	3	4	Total
**Colts**	7	6	0	7	**20**
Chargers	7	0	0	0	**7**

at Jack Murphy Stadium, San Diego, California

- Date: December 20
- Game time: 4:00 p.m. EST/1:00 p.m. PST
- Game weather: 53 °F (12 °C); relative humidity 80%; wind 7 miles per hour (11 km/h; 6.1 kn)
- Game attendance: 46,211
- Referee: Jerry Markbreit
- TV announcers (NBC): Don Criqui (play-by-play) and Paul Maguire (color commentator)

Team	Category	Player	Statistics
IND	Passing	Jack Trudeau	20/39, 201 YDS, 1 TD
IND	Rushing	Eric Dickerson	23 CAR, 115 YDS
IND	Receiving	Matt Bouza	5 REC, 35 YDS
SD	Passing	Dan Fouts	22/37, 257 YDS, 3 INTs
SD	Rushing	Curtis Adams	7 CAR, 26 YDS
SD	Receiving	Gary Anderson	7 REC, 68 YDS

Scoring summary

Quarter	Time	Drive			Team	Scoring information	Score	
Quarter	Time	Plays	Yards	TOP	Team	Scoring information	IND	SD
1	7:59	13	74	7:01	Chargers	Fouts 1-yard touchdown run, Abbott kick good	0	7
1	2:53	7	74	2:54	Colts	Brooks 42-yard touchdown reception from Hogeboom, Biasucci kick good	7	7
2	3:18	12	47	6:02	Colts	36-yard field goal by Biasucci	10	7
2	0:01	9	41	1:07	Colts	41-yard field goal by Biasucci	13	7
4	1:53	3	68	0:57	Colts	Bentley 3-yard touchdown run, Biasucci kick good	20	7
"TOP" = time of possession. For other American football terms, see Glossary of American football.							20	7

==== Week 16: vs. Tampa Bay Buccaneers ====
Week 16: Tampa Bay Buccaneers at Indianapolis Colts – Game summary

Quarter	1	2	3	4	Total
Buccaneers	3	0	0	3	**6**
**Colts**	7	3	7	7	**24**

at Hoosier Dome, Indianapolis, Indiana

- Date: December 27
- Game time: 1:00 p.m. EST
- Game weather: None (played indoors)
- Game attendance: 60,468
- Referee: Jim Tunney
- TV announcers (CBS): Jim Lampley (play-by-play), Ken Stabler (color commentator) and Will McDonough (sideline reporter)

Team	Category	Player	Statistics
TB	Passing		
TB	Rushing		
TB	Receiving		
IND	Passing		
IND	Rushing		
IND	Receiving		

Scoring summary

Quarter	Time	Drive			Team	Scoring information	Score	
Quarter	Time	Plays	Yards	TOP	Team	Scoring information	TB	IND
1	11:43	7	84	3:17	Colts	Dickerson 6-yard touchdown run, Biasucci kick good	0	7
1	4:02	7	39	2:54	Buccaneers	38-yard field goal by Igwebuike	3	7
2	0:08	8	68	0:58	Colts	30-yard field goal by Biasucci	3	10
3	5:39	2	70	1:05	Colts	Dickerson 34-yard touchdown run, Biasucci kick good	3	17
4	11:49	9	60	2:05	Buccaneers	39-yard field goal by Igwebuike	6	17
4	7:54	6	46	3:55	Colts	Bentley 2-yard touchdown run, Biasucci kick good	6	24
"TOP" = time of possession. For other American football terms, see Glossary of American football.							6	24

=== Standings ===
AFC East
	W	L	T	PCT	DIV	CONF	PF	PA	STK
^{(3)} Indianapolis Colts	9	6	0	.600	5–3	8–6	300	238	W2
New England Patriots	8	7	0	.533	6–2	8–4	320	293	W3
Miami Dolphins	8	7	0	.533	2–6	5–7	362	335	L1
Buffalo Bills	7	8	0	.467	4–4	6–6	270	305	L2
New York Jets	6	9	0	.400	3–5	6–5	334	360	L4

== Playoffs ==
Playoff Round	Date	Opponent (seed)	Result	Record	Venue	Attendance	Recap
Wild Card	First-round Bye						
Divisional	January 9	at Cleveland Browns (2)	L 21–38	0–1	Cleveland Stadium	78,586	Recap

=== Game summaries ===
==== AFC Divisional Playoffs: at (A2) Cleveland Browns ====
AFC Divisional Playoffs: Indianapolis Colts at Cleveland Browns – Game summary

Quarter	1	2	3	4	Total
Colts (0–1)	7	7	0	7	21
Browns (1–0)	7	7	7	17	38

at Cleveland Stadium • Cleveland, Ohio

- Date: January 9, 1988
- Game time: 12:30 p.m. EST
- Game weather: 16 °F (−9 °C)
- Game attendance: 78,546
- Referee: Red Cashion
- TV announcers (NBC): Don Criqui (play-by-play), Bob Trumpy (color commentator), Paul Maguire (sideline reporter), and Ahmad Rashad (sideline reporter)

Team	Category	Player	Statistics
IND	Passing	Jack Trudeau	21/33, 251 YDS, 2 TDs, 1 INT
IND	Rushing	Eric Dickerson	15 CAR, 50 YDS
IND	Receiving	Eric Dickerson	7 REC, 65 YDS, 1 TD
CLE	Passing	Bernie Kosar	20/31, 229 YDS, 3 TDs, 1 INT
CLE	Rushing	Earnest Byner	23 CAR, 122 YDS, 1 TD
CLE	Receiving	Ozzie Newsome; Earnest Byner	4 REC, 65 YDS; 4 REC, 36 YDS, 1 TD

Scoring summary

Quarter	Time	Drive			Team	Scoring information	Score	
Quarter	Time	Plays	Yards	TOP	Team	Scoring information	IND	CLE
1	8:14	15	86	6:37	Browns	Byner 10-yard touchdown reception from Kosar, Bahr kick good	0	7
1	2:14	10	74	5:49	Colts	Beach 2-yard touchdown reception from Trudeau, Biasucci kick good	7	7
2	1:51	6	66	3:42	Browns	Langhorne 39-yard touchdown reception from Kosar, Bahr kick good	7	14
2	0:42	7	59	1:01	Colts	Dickerson 19-yard touchdown reception from Trudeau, Biasucci kick good	14	14
3	1:56	13	86	5:36	Browns	Byner 2-yard touchdown run, Bahr kick good	14	21
4	11:09	8	43	3:51	Browns	22-yard field goal by Bahr	14	24
4	3:44	8	68	6:03	Browns	Brennan 2-yard touchdown reception from Kosar, Bahr kick good	14	31
4	1:07	10	82	2:29	Colts	Bentley 1-yard touchdown run, Biasucci kick good	21	31
4	0:39	—	—	—	Browns	Interception returned 48 yards for touchdown by Minnifield, Bahr kick good	21	38
"TOP" = time of possession. For other American football terms, see Glossary of American football.							21	38

- Point spread:
- Over/under:
- Time of game:

Colts	Game Statistics	Browns
23	First downs	25
21–63	Rushes–yards	34–175
265	Passing yards	229
22–39–2	Passes	20–31–1
2–14	Sacked–yards	2–14
251	Net passing yards	229
315	Total yards	404
124	Return yards	101
4–43.8	Punts	1–37.0
2–0	Fumbles–lost	1–0
7–75	Penalties–yards	4–20
27:34	Time of possession	32:26

== See also ==
- History of the Indianapolis Colts
- List of Indianapolis Colts seasons
- Colts–Patriots rivalry
