= 1986 Indianapolis Colts season =

34th season in franchise history

- Owner: Robert Irsay
- General manager: Jim Irsay
- Head coach: Rod Dowhower (fired on December 1, 0–13 record); Ron Meyer (interim, 3–0 record)
- Home stadium: Hoosier Dome

Results
- Record: 3–13
- Division place: 5th AFC East
- Playoffs: Did not qualify
- Pro Bowlers: 3: C Ray Donaldson; T Chris Hinton; P Rohn Stark

The 1986 Indianapolis Colts season was the 34th season for the team in the National Football League (NFL) and third in Indianapolis. The team finished the year with a record of 3 wins and 13 losses, placing last in AFC East division.

The Colts did not win a game until week 14, when they defeated the Atlanta Falcons. Prior to that, at least one sportswriter had theorized that the Colts wanted to finish with an 0–16 record, believing that they needed a franchise quarterback; as it turned out, Miami quarterback Vinny Testaverde was the consensus overall top pick in the forthcoming draft (although there were fears that he, like John Elway in 1983, would refuse to play for the team if they drafted him). The Colts’ record, which included wins in their final two games, ended up not being the worst in the league; the Tampa Bay Buccaneers finished with a 2–14 record and got the first pick (which they would eventually use on Testaverde).

Rod Dowhower entered the season in his second year as head coach, after having replaced Frank Kush in 1985. After the 0–13 start for the team, he was fired and replaced by Ron Meyer, who had himself been fired by the New England Patriots in 1984 and had not coached since. Meyer would lead the Colts to all three of their victories in 1986. The Colts' 12–36 (.250) record from 1984 to this season marks the worst 3-year stretch for the franchise since moving to Indianapolis. After the season, Karl Baldischwiler decided he had played his final NFL game.

== Offseason ==
=== Draft ===
1986 Indianapolis Colts draft
Round	Pick	Player	Position	College	Notes
1	4	Jon Hand	Defensive end	Alabama	
2	47	Jack Trudeau	Quarterback	Illinois	
4	86	Bill Brooks	Wide receiver	Boston University	
5	117	Scott Kellar	Nose tackle	Northern Illinois	
5	124	Gary Walker	Center	Boston University	
7	171	Steve O'Malley	Defensive tackle	Northern Illinois	
7	172	Chris White	Placekicker	Illinois	
7	190	Tommy Sims	Defensive back	Tennessee	
8	198	Trell Hooper	Defensive back	Memphis State	
9	228	Bob Brotzki	Tackle	Syracuse	
10	266	Peter Anderson	Guard	Georgia	
12	309	Steve Wade	Defensive tackle	Vanderbilt	
12	326	Isaac Williams	Defensive tackle	Florida State	
Made roster † Pro Football Hall of Fame * Made at least one Pro Bowl during career

== Personnel ==
=== Staff ===
1986 Indianapolis Colts staff
Front office: President and Treasurer – Robert Irsay; Vice President and General Manager – Jim Irsay; Assistant general manager – Bob Terpening; Director of player personnel – Jack Bushofsky; Director of pro personnel – Clyde Powers; Head coaches: Head coach – Rod Dowhower/Ron Meyer; Assistant head coach – Tom Lovat; Offensive coaches: Offensive coordinator/Running Backs – Billie Matthews; Quarterbacks – John Becker; Receivers – Chip Myers; Offensive Line – Tom Lovat; Assistant Offensive Line – Keith Rowen	Defensive coaches: Defensive coordinator – George Hill; Defensive Line – John Marshall; Linebackers – Rick Venturi; Secondary – George Catavolos; Special teams coaches: Special Teams – Keith Rowen; Strength and conditioning: Strength and Conditioning – Tom Zupancic

=== Roster ===
1986 Indianapolis Colts roster
Quarterbacks (QB): 7 Gary Hogeboom; 5 Blair Kiel; 10 Jack Trudeau; Running backs (RB): 20 Albert Bentley; 44 Owen Gill; 32 Randy McMillan; 34 George Wonsley; Wide receivers (WR): 80 Bill Brooks; 85 Matt Bouza; 88 James Harbour; 86 Walter Murray; Tight ends (TE): 81 Pat Beach LS; 84 Mark Boyer; 83 Tim Sherwin	Offensive linemen (OL): 72 Karl Baldischwiler T; 74 Bob Brotzki T; 71 Kevin Call T; 74 Roger Caron G; 53 Ray Donaldson C; 75 Chris Hinton T; 63 Mark Kirchner G; 66 Ron Solt G; Defensive linemen (DL): 79 Harvey Armstrong DE; 68 Willie Broughton NT; 90 John Haines DE; 78 Jon Hand DE; 94 Scott Kellar NT; 99 Donnell Thompson DE	Linebackers (LB): 57 Dave Ahrens ILB; 50 Duane Bickett OLB; 98 Johnie Cooks OLB; 92 Jeff Leiding OLB; 59 Orlando Lowry OLB; 93 Cliff Odom ILB; 58 Glen Redd ILB; Defensive backs (DB): 40 Pat Ballage SS; 31 Leonard Coleman CB; 38 Eugene Daniel CB; 23 Kenny Daniel CB/FS; 25 Nesby Glasgow SS; 29 Dwight Hicks FS; 21 John Holt CB; 35 Tate Randle FS; Special teams (ST): 4 Dean Biasucci K; 3 Rohn Stark P	Reserve: 62 Peter Anderson G (IR); 47 Dextor Clinkscale S (IR); 56 Lamonte Hunley LB (IR); 55 Barry Krauss LB (IR); 36 Dameon Reilly WR (IR); 88 Robbie Martin WR (IR); 45 Tommy Sims S (IR); 64 Ben Utt G (IR); 60 Gary Walker C (IR); Rookies in italics

== Schedule ==
Week	Date	Opponent	Result	Record	Venue	Attendance
1	September 7	at **New England Patriots**	**L** 3–33	0–1	Sullivan Stadium	55,208
2	September 14	at **Miami Dolphins**	**L** 10–30	0–2	Miami Orange Bowl	51,848
3	September 21	Los Angeles Rams	**L** 7–24	0–3	Hoosier Dome	59,012
4	September 28	**New York Jets**	**L** 7–26	0–4	Hoosier Dome	56,075
5	October 5	at San Francisco 49ers	**L** 14–35	0–5	Candlestick Park	57,252
6	October 12	New Orleans Saints	**L** 14–17	0–6	Hoosier Dome	53,512
7	October 19	at **Buffalo Bills**	**L** 13–24	0–7	Rich Stadium	50,050
8	October 26	**Miami Dolphins**	**L** 13–17	0–8	Hoosier Dome	58,350
9	November 2	Cleveland Browns	**L** 9–24	0–9	Hoosier Dome	57,962
10	November 9	**New England Patriots**	**L** 21–30	0–10	Hoosier Dome	56,890
11	November 16	at **New York Jets**	**L** 16–31	0–11	Giants Stadium	65,149
12	November 23	at Houston Oilers	**L** 17–31	0–12	Astrodome	31,792
13	November 30	San Diego Chargers	**L** 3–17	0–13	Hoosier Dome	47,950
14	December 7	at Atlanta Falcons	**W** 28–23	1–13	Atlanta–Fulton County Stadium	30,397
15	December 14	**Buffalo Bills**	**W** 24–14	2–13	Hoosier Dome	52,783
16	December 21	at Los Angeles Raiders	**W** 30–24	3–13	Los Angeles Memorial Coliseum	41,349
Note: Intra-division opponents are in **bold** text.

=== Standings ===
AFC East
	W	L	T	PCT	DIV	CONF	PF	PA	STK
^{(3)} New England Patriots	11	5	0	.688	7–1	8–4	412	307	W1
^{(4)} New York Jets	10	6	0	.625	6–2	8–4	364	386	L5
Miami Dolphins	8	8	0	.500	5–3	6–6	430	405	L1
Buffalo Bills	4	12	0	.250	1–7	3–11	287	348	L3
Indianapolis Colts	3	13	0	.188	1–7	2–10	229	400	W3

== See also ==
- History of the Indianapolis Colts
- List of Indianapolis Colts seasons
- Colts–Patriots rivalry
