= 1989 Indianapolis Colts season =

37th season in franchise history

- Head coach: Ron Meyer
- Home stadium: Hoosier Dome

Results
- Record: 8–8
- Division place: 2nd AFC East
- Playoffs: Did not qualify
- All-Pros: T Chris Hinton (2nd team)
- Pro Bowlers: C Ray Donaldson; T Chris Hinton; RB Eric Dickerson

The 1989 Indianapolis Colts season was the 37th season for the team in the National Football League and sixth in Indianapolis. The Indianapolis Colts finished the National Football League's 1989 season with a record of 8 wins and 8 losses, and finished tied for second in the AFC East division with the Miami Dolphins. However, the Colts finished ahead of Miami based on better conference record (7–5 vs. Dolphins' 6–8).

== Offseason ==
=== Draft ===
1989 Indianapolis Colts draft
| Round | Pick | Player | Position | College | Notes |
| 1 | 22 | Andre Rison * | Wide receiver | Michigan State | |
| 3 | 72 | Mitchell Benson | Defensive tackle | TCU | |
| 4 | 99 | Pat Tomberlin | Guard | Florida State | |
| 6 | 155 | Quintus McDonald | Linebacker | Penn State | |
| 7 | 182 | Ivy Joe Hunter | Running back | Kentucky | |
| 7 | 185 | Charles Washington | Safety | Cameron | |
| 8 | 212 | Kurt Larson | Linebacker | Michigan State | |
| 9 | 239 | William Mackall | Wide receiver | Tennessee-Martin | |
| 10 | 266 | Jim Thompson | Offensive tackle | Auburn | |
| 11 | 296 | Wayne Johnson | Quarterback | Georgia | |
| 12 | 314 | William DuBose | Running back | South Carolina State | |
| 12 | 323 | Steve Taylor | Quarterback | Nebraska | |
Made roster † Pro Football Hall of Fame * Made at least one Pro Bowl during career

=== Undrafted free agents ===
1989 undrafted free agents of note
| Player | Position | College |
|---|---|---|
| Rotnei Anderson | Running back | Oklahoma |
| Joe Huff | Linebacker | Indiana |
| Ben Jefferson | Guard | Maryland |
| Anthony Parker | Cornerback | Arizona State |
| Paul Reilly | Tight end | Kearney State |
| Cornelius Southall | Defensive back | Notre Dame |

== Personnel ==
=== Staff ===
1989 Indianapolis Colts staff
| Front office: President/treasurer – Robert Irsay; Vice president/general manager – Jim Irsay; Assistant general manager – Bob Terpening; Director of player personnel – Jack Bushofsky; Head coaches: Head coach – Ron Meyer; Offensive coaches: Offensive coordinator – Larry Kennan; Running backs – Leon Burtnett; Receivers – Milt Jackson; Offensive line – Dante Scarnecchia; Offensive assistant – Greg Briner | Defensive coaches: Defensive coordinator – Bill Muir; Linebackers – Rick Venturi; Secondary – George Catavolos; Special teams coaches: Special teams – Brad Seely; Strength and conditioning: Strength and conditioning – Tom Zupancic |

=== Roster ===
1989 Indianapolis Colts roster
| Quarterbacks (QB): 18 Wayne Johnson; 14 Tom Ramsey; 10 Jack Trudeau; Running backs (RB): 20 Albert Bentley KR; 29 Eric Dickerson; 45 Ivy Joe Hunter; Wide receivers (WR): 85 Matt Bouza; 80 Bill Brooks; 86 James Pruitt KR; 87 Andre Rison KR; 83 Clarence Verdin; Tight ends (TE): 81 Pat Beach; 84 Mark Boyer; 88 John Brandes LS | Offensive linemen (OL): 62 Brian Baldinger G; 71 Kevin Call T; 69 Randy Dixon G; 53 Ray Donaldson C; 67 Stan Eisenhooth C; 75 Chris Hinton T; 73 Zefross Moss T; 68 Pat Tomberlin T; 64 Ben Utt G; Defensive linemen (DL): 79 Harvey Armstrong NT; 95 Mitchell Benson NT; 76 Sam Clancy DE; 78 Jon Hand DE; 90 Ezra Johnson DE; 99 Donnell Thompson DE | Linebackers (LB): 51 Chip Banks OLB; 50 Duane Bickett OLB; 54 Jeff Herrod ILB; 59 Kurt Larson OLB; 96 Quintus McDonald LB; 93 Cliff Odom ILB; 56 Fredd Young ILB; Defensive backs (DB): 31 Michael Ball SS; 36 John Baylor CB; 38 Eugene Daniel CB; 37 Chris Goode CB; 43 Anthony Parker CB; 23 Bruce Plummer CB; 39 Mike Prior FS; 27 Keith Taylor FS; 49 Charles Washington SS; Special teams (ST): 4 Dean Biasucci K; 3 Rohn Stark P | Practice squad: 25 Cornell Holloway CB/S; 65 Ralph Jarvis DE; Reserve: 97 O'Brien Alston LB (IR); 17 Chris Chandler QB (IR); 63 Steve Knight DT (IR); Rookies in italics 47 active, 3 reserve, 2 practice squad |

== Regular season ==
=== Schedule ===
| Week | Date | Opponent | Result | Record | Game Site | Attendance |
|---|---|---|---|---|---|---|
| 1 | September 10 | San Francisco 49ers | **L** 24–30 | 0–1 | Hoosier Dome | 60,111 |
| 2 | September 17 | at Los Angeles Rams | **L** 17–31 | 0–2 | Anaheim Stadium | 63,995 |
| 3 | September 24 | Atlanta Falcons | **W** 13–9 | 1–2 | Hoosier Dome | 57,816 |
| 4 | October 1 | at **New York Jets** | **W** 17–10 | 2–2 | Giants Stadium | 65,542 |
| 5 | October 8 | **Buffalo Bills** | **W** 37–14 | 3–2 | Hoosier Dome | 58,890 |
| 6 | October 15 | at Denver Broncos | **L** 3–14 | 3–3 | Mile High Stadium | 74,680 |
| 7 | October 22 | at Cincinnati Bengals | **W** 23–12 | 4–3 | Riverfront Stadium | 57,642 |
| 8 | October 29 | **New England Patriots** | **L** 20–23 (OT) | 4–4 | Hoosier Dome | 59,356 |
| 9 | November 5 | at **Miami Dolphins** | **L** 13–19 | 4–5 | Joe Robbie Stadium | 52,680 |
| 10 | November 12 | at **Buffalo Bills** | **L** 7–30 | 4–6 | Rich Stadium | 79,256 |
| 11 | November 19 | **New York Jets** | **W** 27–10 | 5–6 | Hoosier Dome | 58,236 |
| 12 | November 26 | San Diego Chargers | **W** 10–6 | 6–6 | Hoosier Dome | 58,822 |
| 13 | December 3 | at **New England Patriots** | **L** 16–22 | 6–7 | Sullivan Stadium | 32,234 |
| 14 | December 10 | Cleveland Browns | **W** 23–17 (OT) | 7–7 | Hoosier Dome | 58,550 |
| 15 | December 17 | **Miami Dolphins** | **W** 42–13 | 8–7 | Hoosier Dome | 55,665 |
| 16 | December 24 | at New Orleans Saints | **L** 6–41 | 8–8 | Louisiana Superdome | 49,009 |
Note: Intra-division opponents are in **bold** text.

=== Standings ===
AFC East
| | W | L | T | PCT | DIV | CONF | PF | PA | STK |
|---|---|---|---|---|---|---|---|---|---|
| Buffalo Bills^{(3)} | 9 | 7 | 0 | .563 | 6–2 | 8–4 | 409 | 317 | W1 |
| Indianapolis Colts | 8 | 8 | 0 | .500 | 4–4 | 7–5 | 298 | 301 | L1 |
| Miami Dolphins | 8 | 8 | 0 | .500 | 4–4 | 6–8 | 331 | 379 | L2 |
| New England Patriots | 5 | 11 | 0 | .313 | 4–4 | 5–7 | 297 | 391 | L3 |
| New York Jets | 4 | 12 | 0 | .250 | 2–6 | 3–9 | 253 | 411 | L3 |

== Awards and records ==
- Clarence Verdin, AFC Kickoff Return Leader

== See also ==
- History of the Indianapolis Colts
- List of Indianapolis Colts seasons
- Colts–Patriots rivalry
