= 1990 Indianapolis Colts season =

38th season in franchise history

- Owner: Robert Irsay
- President: Jim Irsay
- Head coach: Ron Meyer
- Home stadium: Hoosier Dome

Results
- Record: 7–9
- Division place: 3rd AFC East
- Playoffs: Did not qualify
- All-Pros: P Rohn Stark (2nd team)
- Pro Bowlers: P Rohn Stark; KR Clarence Verdin

The 1990 Indianapolis Colts season was the 38th season for the team in the National Football League and seventh in Indianapolis. The Indianapolis Colts finished the National Football League's 1990 season with a record of 7 wins and 9 losses, and finished third in the AFC East division. Running back Eric Dickerson held out of training camp, during a contract dispute. The Colts suspended Dickerson four games for conduct detrimental to the team. He returned late in the season and rushed for 677 yards.

The Colts were embarrassed at home in week two by the putrid Patriots, losing 16–14 for New England's lone win of 1990.

On December 22, 1990, Monday Night Football was played two days early, on Saturday night. The 6–8 Colts played at home as underdogs against the Washington Redskins. Trailing 25–14 in the 4th quarter, rookie quarterback Jeff George led an improbable and spectacular comeback which included two touchdowns to tie the game with little time left. The Colts then intercepted Mark Rypien and returned the ball for the go-ahead touchdown. The Colts pulled off the upset in dramatic fashion with one of George's most memorable games of his career. He threw three touchdowns and no interceptions.

== Offseason ==
=== NFL draft ===
1990 Indianapolis Colts draft
Round	Pick	Player	Position	College	Notes
1	1	Jeff George	Quarterback	Illinois	
2	36	Anthony Johnson	Running back	Notre Dame	
4	83	Stacey Simmons	Wide receiver	Florida	
4	94	Bill Schultz	Guard	USC	
4	103	Alan Grant	Cornerback	Stanford	
4	106	Rick Cunningham	Offensive tackle	Texas A&M	
6	148	Tony Walker	Linebacker	Southeast Missouri State	
7	179	James Singletary	Linebacker	East Carolina	
8	206	Ken Clark	Running back	Nebraska	
8	213	Harvey Wilson	Defensive back	Southern	
9	232	Darvell Huffman	Wide receiver	Boston University	
11	290	Carnel Smith	Defensive end	Pittsburgh	
12	311	Gene Benhart	Quarterback	Western Illinois	
12	316	Dean Brown	Guard	Notre Dame	
Made roster

=== Undrafted free agents ===
1990 undrafted free agents of note
Player	Position	College
Bill Ames	Tight end	Washington
Dale Amos	Wide receiver	Franklin & Marshall
Reggie Barnes	Running back	N. E. Oklahoma State
Tim Finkelston	Wide receiver	Virginia
Chad Fortune	Tight End	Louisville
Tim Freeman	Tackle	Penn State
Ricky Johnson	Running back	Maryland
Doug Lowery	Defensive End	DePauw
Dwayne O'Connor	Tight End	Purdue
Alfred Rawls	Running back	Kentucky
David Rider	Cornerback-Safety	New Mexico State
Eugene Riley	Tight end	Ball State
Ron Robinson	Cornerback-Safety	Kentucky
Tony Siragusa	Defensive tackle	Pittsburgh
Mike Teeter	Defensive tackle	Michigan
Matt Vanderbeek	Defensive end	Michigan State
Ron Vargo	Center	Indiana
Reggie Williams	Wide receiver	Pittsburgh

== Personnel ==
=== Staff ===
1990 Indianapolis Colts staff
Front office: President/treasurer – Robert Irsay; Vice president/general manager – Jim Irsay; Assistant general manager – Bob Terpening; Director of player personnel – Jack Bushofsky; Head coaches: Head coach – Ron Meyer; Offensive coaches: Offensive coordinator – Larry Kennan; Running backs – Leon Burtnett; Receivers – Milt Jackson; Tight ends – Brad Seely; Offensive line – Dante Scarnecchia	Defensive coaches: Defensive coordinator – Bill Muir; Linebackers – Rick Venturi; Secondary – George Catavolos; Special teams coaches: Special teams – Brad Seely; Strength and conditioning: Strength and conditioning – Tom Zupancic

=== Roster ===
1990 Indianapolis Colts roster
Quarterbacks (QB): 11 Jeff George; 9 Mark Herrmann; 12 Rusty Hilger; Running backs (RB): 20 Albert Bentley; 29 Eric Dickerson; 45 Ivy Joe Hunter; 23 Anthony Johnson; Wide receivers (WR): 80 Bill Brooks; 84 Jessie Hester; 86 Stanley Morgan; 85 Stacey Simmons; 83 Clarence Verdin; Tight ends (TE): 81 Pat Beach; 89 Orson Mobley	Offensive linemen (OL): 62 Brian Baldinger G; 66 Chris Conlin G; 72 Rick Cunningham T; 69 Randy Dixon G; 53 Ray Donaldson C; 73 Zefross Moss T; 74 Bill Schultz G; 68 Pat Tomberlin G; Defensive linemen (DL): 79 Harvey Armstrong NT; 76 Sam Clancy DE; 94 Jeff Faulkner DE; 78 Jon Hand DE; 93 Ralph Jarvis DE; 98 Tony Siragusa NT; 99 Donnell Thompson DE	Linebackers (LB): 51 Chip Banks OLB; 50 Duane Bickett OLB; 54 Jeff Herrod ILB; 59 Kurt Larson OLB; 96 Quintus McDonald OLB; 97 Scott Radecic ILB; 58 Matt Vanderbeek ILB; 92 Tony Walker OLB; 56 Fredd Young ILB; Defensive backs (DB): 31 Michael Ball SS; 38 Eugene Daniel CB; 37 Chris Goode CB; 26 Alan Grant CB; 25 Cornell Holloway CB; 39 Mike Prior FS; 27 Keith Taylor SS; Special teams (ST): 4 Dean Biasucci K; 3 Rohn Stark P	Practice squad: 65 Joey Banes; 32 Ken Clark RB; 1 Darvell Huffman WR; 40 Reggie Thornton WR; Reserve: -- O'Brien Alston LB (IR); 36 John Baylor CB (IR); 71 Kevin Call T (IR); 87 Eugene Riley TE (IR); 10 Jack Trudeau QB (IR); 35 Reggie Williams WR; Rookies in italics 47 active, 6 reserve, 4 practice squad

== Regular season ==
=== Schedule ===
Week	Date	Opponent	Result	Record	Game Site	Attendance
1	September 9	at **Buffalo Bills**	**L** 10–26	0–1	Ralph Wilson Stadium	78,899
2	September 16	**New England Patriots**	**L** 14–16	0–2	Hoosier Dome	49,256
3	September 23	at Houston Oilers	**L** 10–24	0–3	Astrodome	50,093
4	September 30	at Philadelphia Eagles	**W** 24–23	1–3	Veterans Stadium	62,067
5	October 7	Kansas City Chiefs	**W** 23–19	2–3	Hoosier Dome	54,950
6	Bye					
7	October 21	Denver Broncos	**L** 17–27	2–4	Hoosier Dome	59,850
8	October 28	**Miami Dolphins**	**L** 7–27	2–5	Hoosier Dome	59,213
9	November 5	New York Giants	**L** 7–24	2–6	Hoosier Dome	58,688
10	November 11	at **New England Patriots**	**W** 13–10	3–6	Foxboro Stadium	28,924
11	November 18	**New York Jets**	**W** 17–14	4–6	Hoosier Dome	47,283
12	November 25	at Cincinnati Bengals	**W** 34–20	5–6	Riverfront Stadium	60,051
13	December 2	at Phoenix Cardinals	**L** 17–20	5–7	Sun Devil Stadium	38,043
14	December 9	**Buffalo Bills**	**L** 7–31	5–8	Hoosier Dome	53,268
15	December 16	at **New York Jets**	**W** 29–21	6–8	Giants Stadium	41,423
16	December 22	Washington Redskins	**W** 35–28	7–8	Hoosier Dome	58,173
17	December 30	at **Miami Dolphins**	**L** 17–23	7–9	Joe Robbie Stadium	59,547
Note: Intra-division opponents are in **bold** text.

=== Standings ===
AFC East
	W	L	T	PCT	DIV	CONF	PF	PA	STK
^{(1)} Buffalo Bills	13	3	0	.813	7–1	10–2	428	263	L1
^{(4)} Miami Dolphins	12	4	0	.750	7–1	10–2	336	242	W1
Indianapolis Colts	7	9	0	.438	3–5	5–7	281	353	L1
New York Jets	6	10	0	.375	2–6	4–10	295	345	W2
New England Patriots	1	15	0	.063	1–7	1–11	181	446	L14

== Season summary ==
=== Week 1 at Bills ===
Week One: Indianapolis Colts (0–0) at Buffalo Bills (0–0)

Quarter	1	2	3	4	Total
Colts	3	0	7	0	10
Bills	3	13	0	10	26

at Rich Stadium, Orchard Park, New York

- Date: September 9
- Game time: 4:00 p.m. EST
- Game weather: 59 °F or 15 °C
- Game attendance: 78,899
- Referee: Gerald Austin
- TV announcers (NBC): Jim Donovan and Cris Collinsworth
- Box Score, Box Score

Game information

First quarter

- BUF – Scott Norwood 24-yard field goal, 8:04. Bills 3–0.
- IND – Dean Biasucci 24-yard field goal, 0:12. Tie 3–3.

Second quarter

- BUF – Butch Rolle 3-yard pass from Jim Kelly (Scott Norwood kick), 5:14. Bills 10–3.
- BUF – Scott Norwood 31-yard field goal, 1:58. Bills 13–3.
- BUF – Scott Norwood 37-yard field goal, 0:08. Bills 16–3.

Third quarter

- IND – Stanley Morgan 25-yard pass from Jeff George (Dean Biasucci kick), 6:38. Bills 16–10.

Fourth quarter

- BUF – Scott Norwood 47-yard field goal, 6:08. Bills 19–10.
- BUF – Thurman Thomas 6-yard run (Scott Norwood kick), 1:37. Bills 26–10.

Top passers

- IND – Jeff George – 13/24, 160 yards, TD
- BUF – Jim Kelly – 28/37, 283 yards, TD

Top rushers

- IND – Albert Bentley – 15 rushes, 50 yards
- BUF – Thurman Thomas – 20 rushes, 84 yards, TD

Top receivers

- IND – Stanley Morgan – 2 receptions, 47 yards, TD
- BUF – Keith McKeller – 7 receptions, 78 yards

== See also ==
- History of the Indianapolis Colts
- List of Indianapolis Colts seasons
- Colts–Patriots rivalry
