= 1985 Indianapolis Colts season =

33rd season in franchise history

- Owner: Robert Irsay
- General manager: Jim Irsay
- Head coach: Rod Dowhower
- Home stadium: Hoosier Dome

Results
- Record: 5–11
- Division place: 4th AFC East
- Playoffs: Did not qualify

The 1985 Indianapolis Colts season was the 33rd season for the team in the National Football League (NFL) and second in Indianapolis. The Colts finished the year with a record of 5 wins and 11 losses, and fourth in the AFC East division. The Colts did improve on their 4–12 record from 1984, but missed the playoffs for the 8th straight season. This season was rather sluggish, as the Colts for most of the season alternated wins and losses. After starting out mediocre at 3–5, the Colts would then lose 6 straight to sit at 3–11 before winning their last 2 games to finish 5–11. This would be the only full season for head coach Rod Dowhower, as he was fired 13 games into the following season.

== Offseason ==
=== Draft ===
1985 Indianapolis Colts draft
Round	Pick	Player	Position	College	Notes
1	5	Duane Bickett *	Linebacker	USC	
2	32	Don Anderson	Cornerback	Purdue	
3	61	Anthony Young	Safety	Temple	
4	88	Willie Broughton	Defensive tackle	Miami (FL)	
5	117	Roger Caron	Tackle	Harvard	
Made roster * Made at least one Pro Bowl during career

== Personnel ==
=== Staff ===
1985 Indianapolis Colts staff
Front office: President and Treasurer – Robert Irsay; Vice President and General Manager – Jim Irsay; Assistant general manager – Bob Terpening; Director of player personnel – Jack Bushofsky; Director of pro personnel – Clyde Powers; Head coaches: Head coach – Rod Dowhower; Assistant head coach – Tom Lovat; Offensive coaches: Offensive coordinator/Running Backs – Billie Matthews; Quarterbacks – John Becker; Receivers – Chip Myers; Offensive Line – Tom Lovat; Assistant Offensive Line – Keith Rowen	Defensive coaches: Defensive coordinator – George Hill; Defensive Line – Steve Sidwell; Linebackers – Rick Venturi; Secondary – George Catavolos; Special teams coaches: Special Teams – Keith Rowen; Strength and conditioning: Strength and Conditioning – Tom Zupancic

=== Roster ===
1985 Indianapolis Colts roster
Quarterbacks (QB): 12 Matt Kofler; 18 Mike Pagel; Running backs (RB): 20 Albert Bentley; 32 Randy McMillan; 44 Owen Gill; 34 George Wonsley; Wide receivers (WR): 85 Matt Bouza; 87 Wayne Capers; 31 Robbie Martin; 80 Ricky Nichols; 86 Oliver Williams; Tight ends (TE): 81 Pat Beach LS; 84 Mark Boyer	Offensive linemen (OL): 61 Don Bailey C/G; 76 Karl Baldischwiler T; 71 Kevin Call T; 67 Roger Caron T; 53 Ray Donaldson C; 75 Chris Hinton T; 64 Ben Utt G; Defensive linemen (DL): 97 Charles Benson DE; 68 Willie Broughton NT; 95 Chris Scott DE; 91 Byron Smith DE; 99 Donnell Thompson DE; 94 Scott Virkus DE; 92 Brad White NT	Linebackers (LB): 57 Dave Ahrens ILB; 50 Duane Bickett OLB; 98 Johnie Cooks OLB; 56 Lamonte Hunley ILB; 55 Barry Krauss ILB; 56 Orlando Lowry OLB; 93 Cliff Odom ILB; Defensive backs (DB): 36 Don Anderson CB; 47 Leonard Coleman SS; 38 Eugene Daniel CB; 27 Preston Davis CB; 25 Nesby Glasgow SS; 42 Keith Lee CB; 35 Tate Randle FS; 37 Anthony Young FS; Special teams (ST): 2 Raúl Allegre K; 3 Rohn Stark P	Reserve: 88 James Harbour WR (IR); 63 Mark Kirchner G (IR); 48 Keli McGregor TE (IR); 83 Tim Sherwin TE (IR); 66 Ron Solt G (IR); 28 Mark Smith WR (IR); 96 Blaise Winter DE (IR); 69 Leo Wisniewski NT (IR); Rookies in italics

== Regular season ==
=== Schedule ===
Week	Date	Opponent	Result	Record	Venue	Attendance	Recap
1	September 8	at Pittsburgh Steelers	**L** 3–45	0–1	Three Rivers Stadium	57,279	Recap
2	September 15	at **Miami Dolphins**	**L** 13–30	0–2	Miami Orange Bowl	53,693	Recap
3	September 22	Detroit Lions	**W** 14–6	1–2	Hoosier Dome	60,042	Recap
4	September 29	at **New York Jets**	**L** 20–25	1–3	Giants Stadium	61,987	Recap
5	October 6	**Buffalo Bills**	**W** 49–17	2–3	Hoosier Dome	60,003	Recap
6	October 13	Denver Broncos	**L** 10–15	2–4	Hoosier Dome	60,128	Recap
7	October 20	at **Buffalo Bills**	**L** 9–21	2–5	Rich Stadium	28,430	Recap
8	October 27	Green Bay Packers	**W** 37–10	3–5	Hoosier Dome	59,708	Recap
9	November 3	**New York Jets**	**L** 17–35	3–6	Hoosier Dome	59,683	Recap
10	November 10	at **New England Patriots**	**L** 15–34	3–7	Sullivan Stadium	59,708	Recap
11	November 17	**Miami Dolphins**	**L** 20–34	3–8	Hoosier Dome	59,666	Recap
12	November 24	at Kansas City Chiefs	**L** 7–20	3–9	Arrowhead Stadium	21,762	Recap
13	December 1	**New England Patriots**	**L** 31–38	3–10	Hoosier Dome	56,740	Recap
14	December 8	at Chicago Bears	**L** 10–17	3–11	Soldier Field	59,997	Recap
15	December 15	at Tampa Bay Buccaneers	**W** 31–23	4–11	Tampa Stadium	25,577	Recap
16	December 22	Houston Oilers	**W** 34–16	5–11	Hoosier Dome	55,818	Recap
Note: Intra-division opponents are in **bold** text.

=== Standings ===
AFC East
	W	L	T	PCT	DIV	CONF	PF	PA	STK
Miami Dolphins^{(2)}	12	4	0	.750	6–2	9–3	428	320	W7
New York Jets^{(4)}	11	5	0	.688	6–2	9–3	393	264	W1
New England Patriots^{(5)}	11	5	0	.688	6–2	8–4	362	290	W1
Indianapolis Colts	5	11	0	.313	1–7	2–10	320	386	W2
Buffalo Bills	2	14	0	.125	1–7	2–12	200	381	L6

== See also ==
- History of the Indianapolis Colts
- Indianapolis Colts seasons
- Colts–Patriots rivalry
