= Gary Hogeboom =

American football player and reality television contestant (born 1958)

No. 14, 7, 5
- Position: Quarterback

Personal information
- Born: August 21, 1958 (age 68); Grand Rapids, Michigan, U.S.
- Listed height: 6 ft 4 in (1.93 m)
- Listed weight: 205 lb (93 kg)

Career information
- High school: Northview (Grand Rapids)
- College: Central Michigan (1976–1979)
- NFL draft: 1980: 5th round, 133rd overall pick

Career history
- Dallas Cowboys (1980–1985); Indianapolis Colts (1986–1988); Phoenix Cardinals (1989); Washington Redskins (1990)

Awards and highlights
- MAC Offensive Player of the Year (1979); All-MAC (1979)

Career NFL statistics
- Passing attempts: 1,325
- Passing completions: 743
- Completion percentage: 56.1%
- TD–INT: 49–60
- Passing yards: 9,436
- Passer rating: 71.9
- Stats at Pro Football Reference

Gary Keith Hogeboom (born August 21, 1958) is an American former professional football player, real estate developer, and television personality. He played as a quarterback in the National Football League (NFL) for the Dallas Cowboys, Indianapolis Colts, Phoenix Cardinals, and Washington Redskins. Hogeboom played college football for the Central Michigan Chippewas. He was a contestant on the CBS reality TV show Survivor: Guatemala.

== Early life ==
Hogeboom attended Northview High School, where he practiced football and basketball. He accepted a football scholarship from Central Michigan University.

As a junior in 1978, he became the starter at quarterback in a triple-option wishbone offense, registering 1,095 passing yards, 5 passing touchdowns, 329 rushing yards and 5 rushing touchdowns, while contributing to a 9–2 record. The next year, he posted 1,404 passing yards, 9 passing touchdowns, 417 rushing yards and 9 rushing touchdowns, leading his team to the school's first Mid-American Conference title with a 10–0–1 record.

He finished his career with 3,088 passing yards, 19 passing touchdowns, 957 rushing yards and 16 rushing touchdowns. He had a 19–2–1 records in his 2 seasons as a starter. In total he won 24 games in 28 starts. At the time, he was the school's All-time leader in touchdown passes (19), total offense yards (4,045 yards), pass completions (208), career passing yards (3,088) and was ranked third in passing yards for a season (1,404).

In 1989, he was inducted into the Central Michigan Athletics Hall Of Fame. In 1994, he was inducted into the Mid-American Conference Sports Hall of Fame. In 2000, he was inducted into the Grand Rapids Sports Hall of Fame.

== Professional career ==
=== Dallas Cowboys ===
Hogeboom was selected by the Dallas Cowboys in the fifth round (133rd overall) of the 1980 NFL draft. As a rookie, he earned a roster spot following the retirement of Roger Staubach. He was the third-string quarterback in his first 2 seasons.

==== 1982 season ====
In 1982, he passed Glenn Carano on the depth chart for the backup quarterback role behind Danny White. In the 1982 NFC title game against the Washington Redskins, he replaced a concussed White at the start of the second half and helped the team get back in the contest with 2 consecutive scoring drives, until making two critical interceptions, one returned by Darryl Grant for a touchdown that sealed the 31–17 loss. He completed 14 out of 29 attempts for 162 yards, 2 touchdowns and 2 interceptions. He began to garner attention and opened some eyes from Cowboys coaches and players alike with this performance.

==== 1983 season ====
Prior to the 1983 season, the Cowboy players and fans began to lobby for Hogeboom to be the starting quarterback. White had led the team to three straight NFC Championship game appearances after taking over for Hall of Famer Roger Staubach, but couldn't win a Super Bowl. The players also felt that White had betrayed them because of his public support for the NFL team owners during the 1982 NFL players strike. Furthermore, White was seen as quiet and standoffish, unlike the more vocal and personable Hogeboom.

The team gave Hogeboom more playing time in the pre-season, where he completed 42 out of 74 attempts for 475 yards, 4 touchdowns, 3 interceptions and a 77.1 quarterback rating.

White responded to the criticism by having his best statistical season ever in 1983, leading the Cowboys to a 12–2 record going into a home matchup against the Redskins. However, the Cowboys were beaten at home by a score of 31–10, while the Redskins would go on to finish the season at 14–2, advancing to their second straight Super Bowl. The Cowboys, meanwhile, would lose soundly 42–17 the next week to the San Francisco 49ers on Monday Night Football, and then lose 24–17 in the wildcard playoff game at home against the Los Angeles Rams. The rumblings for White to be benched got stronger. Hogeboom, meanwhile, frustrated with his backup status, requested a trade.

==== 1984 season ====
In the 1984 pre-season, Hogeboom completed 18 out of 32 attempts for 255 yards, one touchdown and no interceptions, compared to White's 46 out of 83 attempts for 609 yards, 3 touchdowns and 4 interceptions.

On August 28, he was named the starter during a press conference where head coach Tom Landry began by announcing that offensive tackle Phil Pozderac would be the starter at quarterback, then corrected himself by saying it would be "Hogenbloom".

Hogeboom started out well, completing 33 passes (club record) for 343 yards and one touchdown in a season opening win on Monday night on national TV against the Los Angeles Rams. However, in the next game against the New York Giants, linebacker Lawrence Taylor sacked him four times and the Cowboys lost, 28–7. Despite the Cowboys 5–3 record, White relieved Hogeboom three games in a row, so Landry went back to the more experienced White against the Indianapolis Colts and New York Giants.

After a poor performance by both quarterbacks against the Giants, Hogeboom regained the starting position. The constant change at quarterback didn't help to improve the team's inconsistent play, eventually resulting in a 14–3 loss to the previously winless Buffalo Bills. White would go on to start the last 4 games, putting an end to one of the most famous quarterback controversies in NFL history. Hogeboom produced a 6–4 record in 10 starts, posting 2,366 passing yards, 7 touchdowns and 14 interceptions.

==== 1985 season ====
In 1985, Hogeboom started 2 games and played in parts of 3 others, substituting for an injured White. Hogeboom was charged with the loss in two games, completing 70 passes for 978 yards, 5 touchdowns and 7 interceptions.

On April 28, 1986, he was traded to the Colts in exchange for switching positions in the second round of the 1986 NFL draft and a conditional draft choice (not exercised). With the Colts' 2nd-round pick, the Cowboys selected Darryl Clack, and with the Cowboys' 2nd-round pick, the Colts selected Jack Trudeau.

=== Indianapolis Colts ===
==== 1986 season ====
After acquiring Hogeboom the Indianapolis Colts traded Mike Pagel, who had been the previous starter at quarterback, to the Cleveland Browns, in exchange for a ninth round pick (#247-Bob Ontko) in the 1987 NFL draft.

The excitement was high at Hogeboom's arrival, as the franchise had not seen quality quarterback play since the days of Bert Jones. It was thought that giving head coach Rod Dowhower something to work with would yield great results, as he made his name with the St. Louis Cardinals where he helped develop Neil Lomax.

The Colts got off to a shaky start, losing in New England 33–3. The next week, against the Miami Dolphins, the Colts lost not only the game but also Hogeboom, who was injured after picking up an Albert Bentley fumble and being tackled by Dolphin's safety Lyle Blackwood at the end of a 50-yard run. On the play Hogeboom had the opportunity to run safely out of bounds, but instead tried to gain additional yards. Blackwood physically picked Hogeboom up and drove him into the ground, causing a serious right (throwing) shoulder separation. Colts General Manager Jim Irsay was upset about the play. "The way it looked on TV, it was a malicious tackle," he said. "If that's the case, I think a player should be suspended. You're talking about knocking out a team's starting quarterback."

Hogeboom was assumed to be lost for the season; rookie Jack Trudeau was forced into the starting lineup. The team struggled through the season, losing their first thirteen games. At 0-13, Dowhower was fired, and former Southern Methodist University and New England Patriots' coach Ron Meyer was brought in as his replacement.

Hogeboom surprised everyone by returning and starting for Meyer's first game as the Colts coach. The team faced the Atlanta Falcons, quite naturally a heavy underdog. Hogeboom played well, helping the Colts come from behind to win on a blocked punt at the end of the fourth quarter. The Colts shocked the league by winning the last three games of the season to finish up at 3–13, generating optimism heading into the next season.

==== 1987 season ====
With a potential player strike looming, the Colts started the 1987 season with two losses, the second with Jack Trudeau in place of an injured Hogeboom. It was at this point that the NFL Players' Association called a work stoppage. Hogeboom was one of the handful of players who chose to cross the picket lines and keep playing. At issue was specific language in Hogeboom's contract which potentially could have cost him all his remaining salary.

The owners decided to field teams of replacement players to fulfill their obligation to the ticket holders and television networks. Hogeboom led the Colts' replacement players to a 2–0 record before being injured in the second game. The injury was caused by veteran defensive end Marty Lyons, who flagrantly speared him on a quarterback sneak play, breaking a rib in his back and puncturing a lung. Although the Colts lost the last strike game with a new quarterback, the victories in the previous contests were crucial in securing the franchise's first playoff berth in ten years.

After the strike, Jack Trudeau started the next four games, compiling a 2–2 record. After a win against the New England Patriots, the Colts made a blockbuster trade to get star running back Eric Dickerson. Since Hogeboom's injury had healed, he was re-inserted as the starter, helping the team win against the Miami Dolphins, but they followed that up with another loss to the New England Patriots. The following week, Hogeboom led the Colts to a rousing home win versus the Houston Oilers. However, Hogeboom was to again be injured in this game. On a 22-yard touchdown pass to Albert Bentley, Hogeboom was struck on the inside part of his throwing arm by a blitzing Jeff Donaldson. This blow drove his arm up in an unnatural way, dislocating his right shoulder and sending him to the injured reserve list.

Jack Trudeau would finish out the season as the starter, taking the Colts to their first playoff game since 1977, which they would lose 38–21 against the Cleveland Browns.

==== 1988 season ====
Although Hogeboom started in the season opener and completed 15 out of 20 passes, he was demoted afterward to third-string quarterback, with rookie Chris Chandler earning the starting job.

Against the San Diego Chargers, coach Meyer unveiled the wishbone offense, in which Hogeboom would be used on occasions during the season. He also came off the bench for an injured Chandler, leading the team to a 17–14 win against the Buffalo Bills. At the end of the year, he was left unprotected—eligible to sign with any team that wanted him—under Plan B free agency.

=== Phoenix Cardinals ===
On March 3, 1989, Hogeboom was signed as a Plan B free agent with the Phoenix Cardinals, reuniting with head coach and former Cowboys assistant Gene Stallings. He was the highest signed player, agreeing to a four-year, $3.27 million contract, including a $250,000 signing bonus.

He was acquired because of Neil Lomax's problematic arthritic left hip, which eventually forced him to retire. Hogeboom was named the starter and posted career highs with 2,591 passing yards, 14 touchdowns and 19 interceptions, and finished with a 5–8 record. The next year Joe Bugel was hired as the new head coach. Hogeboom was waived on September 3, 1990.

=== Washington Redskins ===
On September 23, 1990, he signed as a free agent with the Washington Redskins for depth purposes after quarterback Mark Rypien was injured. He was released on December 28 to make room for defensive tackle Tracy Rocker.

Hogeboom played for eleven seasons (1980–1990) and passed for 9,346 yards, 49 touchdowns and 60 interceptions, along with 164 rushing yards and 4 rushing touchdowns.

== NFL career statistics ==
Legend
**Bold**	Career high

=== Regular season ===
Year	Team	Games			Passing									Rushing					Sacks	
Year	Team	GP	GS	Record	Cmp	Att	Pct	Yds	Y/A	Lng	TD	Int	Rtg	Att	Yds	Avg	Lng	TD	Sck	Yds
1980	DAL	2	0	0–0	0	0	0.0	0	0.0	0	0	0	0.0	0	0	0.0	0	0	0	0
1981	DAL	1	0	0–0	0	0	0.0	0	0.0	0	0	0	0.0	0	0	0.0	0	0	0	0
1982	DAL	4	0	0–0	3	8	37.5	45	5.6	26	0	1	17.2	3	0	0.0	0	0	0	0
1983	DAL	6	0	0–0	11	17	**64.7**	161	**9.5**	24	1	1	**90.6**	6	-10	-1.7	-1	0	0	0
1984	DAL	16	10	**6–4**	195	**367**	53.1	2,366	6.4	68	7	14	63.7	15	19	1.3	11	0	26	211
1985	DAL	16	2	0–2	70	126	55.6	978	7.8	58	5	7	70.8	8	48	**6.0**	**15**	**1**	14	118
1986	IND	5	5	3–2	85	144	59.0	1,154	8.0	60	6	6	81.2	10	20	2.0	6	**1**	18	144
1987	IND	6	6	4–2	99	168	58.9	1,145	6.8	**72**	9	5	85.0	3	3	1.0	2	0	8	63
1988	IND	9	1	0–1	76	131	58.0	996	7.6	58	7	7	77.7	11	-8	-0.7	6	**1**	12	88
1989	PHO	14	13	5–8	**204**	364	56.0	**2,591**	7.1	59	**14**	**19**	69.5	**27**	**89**	3.3	**15**	**1**	**40**	**266**
Career		79	37	18-19	743	1,325	56.1	9,436	7.1	72	49	60	71.9	83	161	1.9	15	4	118	890

=== Postseason ===
Year	Team	Games			Passing									Rushing					Sacks	
Year	Team	GP	GS	Record	Cmp	Att	Pct	Yds	Y/A	Lng	TD	Int	Rtg	Att	Yds	Avg	Lng	TD	Sck	Yds
1982	DAL	1	0	0–0	14	29	48.3	162	5.6	23	2	2	59.8	3	0	0.0	0	0	0	0
Career		1	0	0-0	14	29	48.3	162	5.6	23	2	2	59.8	0	0	0.0	0	0	0	0

== Survivor ==
In 2005, Hogeboom was a contestant on Survivor: Guatemala, the 11th season of the CBS reality TV show Survivor. He kept his professional sports past a secret and even claimed that he was a landscaper named Gary Hawkins. He did this out of fear that he would be eliminated right away if the other competitors assumed he was already wealthy, being a former NFL quarterback. Unfortunately for him, his plan failed when another contestant, Danni Boatwright, who worked in sports radio, recognized him immediately. Despite this confrontation between the two, Danni would be Gary's closest ally throughout the game. In fact, post-show interviews from other contestants revealed that they actually all knew his real identity but didn't care, because he was a strong, well-liked player.

Hogeboom was eliminated on Day 30 and became the third jury member, after saving himself from elimination by using the hidden immunity idol at a previous Tribal Council; his elimination was unrelated to the issue of his true identity, simply coming down to the powerful alliance of Rafe Judkins, Stephenie LaGrossa, Cindy Hall, Lydia Morales, and Judd Sergeant voting off non-alliance members. After Hogeboom was voted out, he confessed in his final words that his name was Gary Hogeboom and he was an ex-NFL quarterback. He went down in Survivor history as the first person to ever find and play a hidden immunity idol at Tribal Council.

== Personal life ==
Hogeboom is married with four children. He lives in Grand Haven, Michigan, where he is a private real estate developer. He also coaches the JV Girls basketball team at Grand Haven High School.
