= Pat Beach =

American football player (born 1959)

No. 81, 83, 89
- Position: Tight end

Personal information
- Born: December 28, 1959 (age 66); Grants Pass, Oregon, U.S.
- Listed height: 6 ft 4 in (1.93 m)
- Listed weight: 247 lb (112 kg)

Career information
- High school: Pullman (Pullman, Washington)
- College: Washington State
- NFL draft: 1982: 6th round, 140th overall pick

Career history
- Baltimore/Indianapolis Colts (1982–1991); New York Jets (1992)*; Philadelphia Eagles (1992); Phoenix Cardinals (1993)
- * Offseason or practice squad member only

Awards and highlights
- Second-team All-Pac-10 (1981)

Career NFL statistics
- Receptions: 163
- Receiving yards: 1,558
- Touchdowns: 14
- Stats at Pro Football Reference

Patrick Jesse Beach (born December 28, 1959) is an American former professional football player who was a tight end for 11 seasons in the National Football League (NFL) with the Baltimore/Indianapolis Colts, Philadelphia Eagles, and Phoenix Cardinals. He played college football for the Washington State Cougars in Pullman.

== Early life ==
Born in Grants Pass, Oregon, Beach moved to Pullman with his family at age eleven. A three-sport athlete at Pullman High School (football, basketball, track & field), he played college football in town at Washington State University (WSU) under head coach Jim Walden.

Beach led the Cougars to the Holiday Bowl in 1981 and was selected by the Colts in the sixth round (140th overall) of the 1982 NFL draft.

== Professional career ==
In his second NFL season in 1983, Beach scored the Baltimore Colts' last touchdown in a 20–10 win over the Houston Oilers on December 18, a twelve-yard completion from Mike Pagel with less than two minutes remaining. The franchise relocated to Indianapolis prior to the 1984 season.

Following the 1987 season, Beach caught a two-yard touchdown pass in the Colts' divisional playoff game against the Cleveland Browns, a 38–21 loss. In his career, he totaled 163 catches for 1,558 yards, averaging 9.6 yards per catch, and caught 14 touchdowns.

== NFL career statistics ==
Legend
**Bold**	Career high

=== Regular season ===
Year	Team	Games		Receiving				
Year	Team	GP	GS	Rec	Yds	Avg	Lng	TD
1982	BAL	9	1	4	45	**11.3**	17	1
1983	BAL	**16**	2	5	56	11.2	16	1
1985	IND	**16**	**16**	**36**	**376**	10.4	**30**	**6**
1986	IND	**16**	**16**	25	265	10.6	26	1
1987	IND	12	12	28	239	8.5	16	0
1988	IND	**16**	**16**	26	235	9.0	23	0
1989	IND	**16**	13	14	87	6.2	17	2
1990	IND	**16**	11	12	124	10.3	21	1
1991	IND	12	10	5	56	11.2	26	0
1992	PHI	**16**	7	8	75	9.4	16	2
1993	PHO	15	0	0	0	0.0	0	0
		160	104	163	1,558	9.6	30	14

=== Playoffs ===
Year	Team	Games		Receiving				
Year	Team	GP	GS	Rec	Yds	Avg	Lng	TD
1987	IND	1	**1**	**2**	**6**	**3.0**	**4**	**1**
1992	PHI	**2**	0	0	0	0.0	0	0
		3	1	2	6	3.0	4	1

== Personal ==
Beach married high school friend Robyn Crawford in 2007.
