= Duane Bickett =

American football player (born 1962)

No. 50
- Position: Linebacker

Personal information
- Born: December 1, 1962 (age 63); Los Angeles, California, U.S.
- Listed height: 6 ft 5 in (1.96 m)
- Listed weight: 251 lb (114 kg)

Career information
- High school: Glendale (Glendale, California)
- College: USC
- NFL draft: 1985: 1st round, 5th overall pick

Career history
- Indianapolis Colts (1985–1993); Seattle Seahawks (1994–1995); Carolina Panthers (1996)

Awards and highlights
- NFL Defensive Rookie of the Year (1985); Second-team All-Pro (1987); Pro Bowl (1987); PFWA All-Rookie Team (1985); Pac-10 Defensive Player of the Year (1984); First-team All-American (1984); First-team All-Pac-10 (1984)

Career NFL statistics
- Total tackles: 1,079
- Sacks: 53
- Forced fumbles: 9
- Fumble recoveries: 14
- Interceptions: 9
- Stats at Pro Football Reference

Duane Clair Bickett (born December 1, 1962) is an American former professional football player who was a linebacker in the National Football League (NFL) for 12 seasons with the Indianapolis Colts, Seattle Seahawks, and Carolina Panthers. Bickett played college football for the USC Trojans.

== Early life ==
Duane Bickett was born on December 1, 1962, in Los Angeles, California. He attended Glendale High School where he played high school football, basketball, and baseball. Bickett was a standout player in basketball and football. As a senior on the basketball team, he helped lead Glendale to a 2-A CIF state title. He was named the CIF 2-A Co-Player of the Year and earned All-CIF First-team honors while averaging 18.0 points per game. The Los Angeles Times also named Bickett as their player of the year.

In football, Bickett played on both offense and defense as a tight end and defensive end. As a senior, Bickett caught 47 passes for 581 yards and seven touchdowns. He was named to the Los Angeles Times All-Star team as an offensive selection, where his Glendale team finished in first in the Foothill League. Bickett received a football scholarship to attend the University of Southern California (USC).

== College career ==
Bickett played college football at USC from 1982 to 1984. Bickett was first recruited as a tight end before being converted to a linebacker prior to his sophomore year.

As a sophomore in 1982, Bickett was used as a backup linebacker. He recorded 31 tackles and three interceptions for the Trojans as they finished 8–3 on the season with a final #15 ranking in the AP poll.

In 1983, Bickett earned a starting role as a defensive end, although he did not play in a traditional three-point lineman stance. Bickett played as a third outside linebacker alongside fellow junior Jack Del Rio and senior Keith Browner. Bickett had a productive year, leading USC with 105 tackles and adding two interceptions. Despite spraining is knee in a mid-season loss against Arizona State, Bickett came back the following week against rivals Notre Dame. Bickett earned both academic and athletic honors, being named to the 1983 Pac-10 Conference All-Academic Football Team, 1983 Pac-10 All-Conference Honorable Mention, and 1983 Academic All-America Second-Team. The season was disappointing for USC, who finished at 4–6–1.

In 1984, Bickett returned to his traditional linebacker spot as a senior and USC returned to form. Bickett had his best collegiate season, with 151 tackles, 16 tackles for loss, 13 pass deflections, and one interception. USC went 9–3 on the year, winning the Pac-10 Conference Title with a key upset over #1-ranked Washington late in the season. Bickett was named the 1984 Pac-10 Defensive Player of the Year and earned All-America First-Team, All-Pac-10 First-Team, and Academic All-America First-Team honors. The #18-ranked Trojans faced #6 Ohio State in the 1985 Rose Bowl, upsetting the Buckeyes 20–17.

== Professional career ==
Bickett was selected by the Indianapolis Colts in the first round of the 1985 NFL draft with the fifth overall pick. He had a 12-year NFL career with the Indianapolis Colts, Seattle Seahawks, and Carolina Panthers.

=== Indianapolis Colts (1985–1993) ===
Bickett missed much of his rookie offseason due to a contract dispute. However, when he joined the team prior to the regular season opener he was an immediate starter and appeared in all 16 games at outside linebacker. Bickett had 30 tackles within the first four games, proving his worth as a top draft selection. Bickett's first NFL interception came in a week 5 thrashing of the Buffalo Bills. Bickett ran into the backfield and nearly sacked Buffalo quarterback Vince Ferragamo before throwing up his hands and catching an errant throw. His high production continued throughout the season, finishing the year with 141 total tackles, six sacks, one forced fumble, and one interception. Bickett led the Colts in tackles and sacks and was selected to the 1985 PWFA NFL All-Rookie Team and was named the 1985 NFL Defensive Rookie of the Year.

In 1986, Bickett had his highest career tackle total with 144 combined tackles and added five sacks, one forced fumble, and two interceptions. Bickett again had a quick start to the season, totalling 62 tackles and two sacks in first six games. Bickett was named the Colts' most valuable player by the team and was an alternate at the 1986 Pro Bowl. Despite Bickett's positive play, the Colts started the season at 0-13 and finished at 3–13 after firing head coach Rod Dowhower and replacing him with Ron Meyer.

The 1987 season was interrupted by a player's strike. All week three games were cancelled and games during weeks four through six were contested using "replacement players." In his first game back after the strike ended, Bickett helped seal the win against the New England Patriots. In the third quarter, he sacked Tony Eason who fumbled. The ball was recovered by Colts defensive end Donnell Thompson who returned it for a touchdown. Bickett played in all 12 games not affected by the strike, posting 113 total tackles, a career-high eight sacks, and two forced fumbles. He was named to the 1987 Pro Bowl and earned a 1987 All-Pro Second-Team selection. The Colts won the AFC East Division with a 9–6 record, making their first playoff appearance since moving to Indianapolis. They lost in the Divisional Round to the Cleveland Browns.

From 1988 to 1991, Bickett never recorded less than 100 combined tackles in a season. In the 1989 season, Bickett matched his career-high with eight sacks in addition to his 100 total tackles. Bickett and linebacker Jeff Herrod shared the Colts' team tackling lead throughout this era. In 1992, Bickett recorded 89 tackles and 6.5 sacks.

In 1993, Bickett's final season with the Colts, he was given the franchise tag increasing his salary to the average of the top five linebackers in the NFL. He posted 97 tackles and 3.5 sacks. Three of those sacks came in week four against the Cleveland Browns, where Bickett and the Colts stifled quarterbacks Bernie Kosar and Vinny Testaverde on the way to a 23–10 victory. Bickett was named AFC Defensive Player of the Week.

Following a disappointing 4–12 season, the Colts sought to rebuild. The team cut several veteran players, including Bickett, on February 17, 1994.

=== Seattle Seahawks (1994–1995) ===
Bickett signed a two-year, $1.4 million contract with the Seattle Seahawks on June 22, 1994.

During his time with the Seahawks, Bickett served as a backup linebacker and special teams player. In 1994, he appeared in seven games with one start with eight tackles on the season. In 1995, he appeared in 15 games and recorded seven tackles.

=== Carolina Panthers (1996) ===
On April 25, 1996, Bickett signed a one-year contract with the Carolina Panthers. Bickett continued as a backup linebacker and special teamer, but contributed in all 16 games of the regular season. He finished the year with 12 tackles and two sacks.

In only their second year in the NFL, the Panthers went 12–4 in 1996. They won the NFC West Division and defeated the defending Super Bowl champion Dallas Cowboys in the Divisional Round. Bickett had one assisted tackle against the Cowboys. In the 1996 NFC Championship Game, the Panthers lost to the eventual Super Bowl winning Green Bay Packers.

Bickett left the Panthers as an unrestricted free agent following the 1996 season, effectively ending his career.

== NFL statistics ==
Year	Team	Games		Tackles				Fumbles			Interceptions		
Year	Team	GP	GS	Tot	Solo	Ast	Sk	FF	FR	Yds	Int	Yds	TD
1985	IND	16	16	141	–	–	6.0	0	0	0	1	0	0
1986	IND	16	16	144	–	–	5.0	0	0	0	2	10	0
1987	IND	12	12	113	–	–	8.0	0	0	0	0	0	0
1988	IND	16	16	126	–	–	3.5	0	0	0	3	7	0
1989	IND	16	16	100	–	–	8.0	0	0	0	1	6	0
1990	IND	15	15	117	–	–	4.5	0	0	0	1	9	0
1991	IND	16	16	125	–	–	5.0	0	0	0	0	0	0
1992	IND	15	15	89	–	–	6.5	0	2	0	1	14	0
1993	IND	15	15	97	63	21	3.5	1	1	0	0	0	0
1994	SEA	7	1	8	7	1	0.0	0	0	0	0	0	0
1995	SEA	15	0	7	5	2	1.0	1	0	0	0	0	0
1996	CAR	16	0	12	7	5	2.0	0	0	0	0	0	0
Career		175	138	1,079	81	29	53.0	2	3	0	9	46	0

Note: Solo and assisted tackles were not consistently tracked prior to the 1994 season.

== Personal life ==
Bickett returned to California following his retirement from the NFL. He served as an assistant coach at Torrey Pines High School in San Diego, California.

Bickett's son, Louie Bickett, was a linebacker for the University of California.

Following his graduation from high school, Bickett's parents moved to Australia. Bickett's brother, Don, played professional basketball in Australia in the National Basketball League.
