= Jim Perryman =

American football player (born 1960)

No. 23, 43
- Position: Safety

Personal information
- Born: December 23, 1960 (age 65); Contra Costa County, California, U.S.
- Listed height: 6 ft 0 in (1.83 m)
- Listed weight: 180 lb (82 kg)

Career information
- High school: Seton-La Salle Catholic (Mt. Lebanon, Pennsylvania)
- College: Millikin
- NFL draft: 1983: undrafted

Career history
- Denver Gold (1983)*; Pittsburgh Maulers (1984); Oakland Invaders (1985)*; Buffalo Bills (1985–1986); Indianapolis Colts (1987–1988)
- * Offseason or practice squad member only
- Stats at Pro Football Reference

James T. Perryman Jr. (born December 23, 1960) is an American former professional football safety who played in the National Football League (NFL) with the Buffalo Bills and Indianapolis Colts. He played college football for the Millikin Big Blue.

== Early life ==
James T. Perryman Jr. was born on December 23, 1960, in Contra Costa County, California. He attended Seton-La Salle Catholic High School in Mt. Lebanon, Pennsylvania.

== College career ==
Perryman enrolled at Millikin University to play college football for the Big Blue. He was a member of the Big Blue from 1979 to 1982. He blocked five punts during a two-game span in 1980. Through November 14, 1980, he had nine blocked punts on the season. Perryman was noted as being Millikin's fastest player with a 4.45 second 40-yard dash. He was inducted into Millikin's athletics hall of fame in 1994.

== Professional career ==
Perryman was selected by the Denver Gold in the 20th round, with the 232nd overall pick, of the 1983 USFL draft. He signed with the team on January 10, 1983. He was released on February 2, a month before the start of the regular season.

On October 5, 1983, Perryman signed with the Pittsburgh Maulers for the 1984 USFL season. He was released on February 16, 1984, ten days before the start of the regular season. He re-signed with the Maulers on May 2 and played in seven games as a safety. The Maulers folded after the season.

On December 6, 1984, Perryman was selected by the Oakland Invaders in the 1984 USFL allocation draft. He was released on January 28, 1985, several weeks before the regular season.

Perryman signed with the Buffalo Bills on March 21, 1985. He was released on August 27, after the third preseason game, but later re-signed on October 12. He played in 11 games for the Bills as a backup safety and special teams player during the 1985 season, recording two sacks and two forced fumbles. He was noted as being the fastest player on the Bills and an "outstanding" special teams player. On November 17, 1985, against the Cleveland Browns, Perryman lined up at wide receiver for one play late in the second quarter. Bills quarterback Bruce Mathison threw the ball towards Perryman, who had run 40 yards down the field. However, he became tangled up with Browns defensive back Hanford Dixon and the pass fell incomplete. No penalty was called. Perryman had not played offense since high school. Perryman was placed on injured reserve the next season on August 18, 1986, and later released on September 24, 1986.

Perryman was signed by the Indianapolis Colts on May 11, 1987. He did not join the strikers during the 1987 NFL players strike. He played in 14 games overall, starting three, for the Colts during the 1987 season as a strong safety/cornerback, recording 18 solo tackles, five assisted tackles, one interception, one sack, and one fumble recovery. Perryman also played special teams. He appeared in one playoff game as well. He was released on August 29, 1988, after the fourth preseason game of the 1988 season. Perryman was re-signed on September 7 but released again on September 10.
