= Chuck Banks =

American football player (born 1964)

No. 36, 37
- Position: Fullback running back

Personal information
- Born: January 4, 1964 (age 62); Baltimore, Maryland, U.S.
- Listed height: 6 ft 2 in (1.88 m)
- Listed weight: 225 lb (102 kg)

Career information
- High school: Northwestern (Baltimore, Maryland)
- College: Ferrum; West Virginia Tech
- NFL draft: 1986: 12th round, 310th overall pick

Career history
- Houston Oilers (1986); Indianapolis Colts (1987); New York Jets (1989)*
- * Offseason or practice squad member only

Awards and highlights
- Northwestern HS Hall of Fame (2013); West Virginia Tech hall of fame (2012)

Career NFL statistics
- Rushing yards: 325
- Rushing average: 4.1
- Receptions: 16
- Receiving yards: 121
- Stats at Pro Football Reference

Charles Edward Banks Jr. (born January 4, 1964) is an American former professional football player who played running back in the National Football League (NFL) for the Houston Oilers/Tennessee Titans and the Indianapolis Colts.

He played college football at Ferrum College and transferred to West Virginia University Institute of Technology and in 1986 became the first player in school history to win a place on the NFL active 53 man roster. He was elected to the school's Hall of Fame in 2012.

He is currently the president of the NFL-PA Baltimore Chapter.

== Biography ==
=== Early life ===
Charles "Chuck" Banks was born January 4, 1964, in Baltimore, Maryland. He attended Northwestern High School Baltimore City, Maryland

=== College career ===
Banks entered West Virginia Tech as a Freshman in 1984, finding his way to varsity playing time almost immediately. Banks was the hero of a September 8, 1984, game against Georgetown College of Kentucky, when he broke a 65-yard touchdown run with just 1:17 remaining in the fourth quarter to lead the Golden Bears to a dramatic 16–15 come-from-behind victory.

Another career highlight came the following year, when he scored four rushing touchdowns for West Virginia Tech in a 35–10 victory over Davidson College on November 9, 1985.

Banks was projected as a potential 4th to 8th round draft pick in the upcoming 1986 NFL draft.

=== Professional career ===
Banks was selected in the 1986 USFL draft. He was selected as the number #62 overall pick by the Arizona Outlaws as a running back.

==== Houston Oilers ====
Banks was selected in the 12th round of the 1986 NFL Draft by the Houston Oilers of the National Football League. Houston's pick was the 310th overall in the lottery, which ran for 12 rounds and 333 picks. Banks was disappointed by the draft, later saying:

"After the 10th round I lost hope and left my room. I thought no one was going to take me. Then I came back and they told me the Oilers had drafted me in the 12th round."

Banks headed for Texas in June to attend Operation Headstart, a month-long rookie mini-camp held by the Oilers to ease acclimation of new players to the team.

Banks signed with the team on July 21, on the eve of the team opening its 1986 training camp at Angelo State University, along with five other Houston draft picks. When he made the Oilers squad as backup fullback, Banks became the first player in West Virginia Tech school history to make an NFL roster.

Banks got his opportunity in week two of the 1986 season when starting fullback Larry Moriarty suffered a shoulder injury, thrusting the largely unheralded rookie into the game. Banks rose to the challenge, picking up 43 yards on 10 carries and catching 2 passes for 26 more yards in his first significant NFL appearance.

After the game, Oilers head coach Jerry Glanville gave Banks a mixed review of his first effort:

"He did a good job of making people miss and he ran through some tackles. But he still does some things young players do. We ran the power sweep last week and he didn't block. He'll get those things down and he'll be a lot better than what you saw on Sunday."

The following game against the Pittsburgh Steelers proved to be a disaster, however, with Banks and a dinged-up Moriarty combining for negative 1 yard in eight carries as part of an anemic 81-yard effort for Glanville's run-heavy offense.

Banks was waived on November 1, 1986, to make roster space for safety Allen Lyday, returning to the team from the Injured Reserve list. The severance proved to be a brief one when Banks was re-signed by the Oilers on November 12, 1986, after running back Butch Woolfolk suffered a fractured left shoulder in a game against the Cincinnati Bengals.

Banks remained with the Oilers for the rest of the 1986 season and went with the team into its 1987 training camp. He was waived midway through the preseason, however, given his release on September 7, 1987.

==== Indianapolis Colts ====
The year 1987 was marred by a protracted players' strike, called after the games of the second week of the season were completed. The schedule for week 3 was cancelled and teams rushed to cobble together replacement rosters of players willing to cross the picket lines of the National Football League Players Association and break the strike.

Out of football after being cut by the Oilers, Chuck Banks was claimed by the Indianapolis Colts and signed to a contract by general manager Jim Irsay as a "replacement player" during the strike.

Banks had his biggest day as a pro during the second of the three games played by strikebreakers in the 1987 season, gaining 159 yards on 22 carries and adding 22 more yards on five catches in a 6–0 victory over the New York Jets. In a post-game news conference, head coach Ron Meyer called Banks' output in the game "exceptional," declaring "we expect it from our single back, no matter who it is, and in this case Chuck Banks was very, very productive."

For his part, the Baltimore native Banks felt mixed feelings playing for the team that had recently pulled up stakes and abandoned his home town: "At first I was angry; I went to a lot of games in Baltimore. But I'm a Colts fan, and I would love to stay and play with them once this [strike] is all over."

The third replacement game would not be so fortunate for Banks, however, with him knocked out of the contest with an ankle sprain in the first half after gaining only 17 yards.

With the strike over, Banks briefly remained on the Indianapolis Colts roster. Knee and ankle injuries proved too much, however, and the team placed him on the Injured Reserve list during the first week of November, effectively ending his NFL career.

During his NFL career, including both strike and non-strike competition, Banks appeared in 16 games, carrying the ball 79 times for 325 yards, an average of 4.1 yards per carry. He added another 121 yards gained on 16 passes caught. He never scored an NFL touchdown.

== Awards and honors ==
- Named NFL Offensive Player of the Week vs. the New York Jets with 159 yards on 25 carries on October 11, 1987
- Inducted into the West Virginia University Institution of Technology Football Hall of Fame in 2012
- Northwestern High School (Baltimore, Md.) Football Hall of Fame in 2016
- National Football League Players Association of Baltimore President (2022–present)
- Inducted into Ferrum College Football Hall of Fame in 2025
- President's Lifetime Achievement Award from former President Joe Biden 2025

== Footnotes ==
The football database
