= 1987 All-Pro Team =

Official list of the best NFL players in 1987

The 1987 All-Pro Team is composed of the National Football League players that were named to the Associated Press, Newspaper Enterprise Association, Pro Football Writers Association, Pro Football Weekly, and The Sporting News in 1987. Both first- and second- teams are listed for the AP and NEA teams. These are the five teams that are included in Total Football II: The Official Encyclopedia of the National Football League. In 1987 NEA went with a 3-4 format for their All-Pro defense.

== Teams ==
Offense
Position	First team	Second team
Quarterback	Joe Montana, San Francisco 49ers (AP, PFWA, PFW); John Elway, Denver Broncos (NEA, TSN)	John Elway, Denver Broncos (AP-2); Joe Montana, San Francisco 49ers (NEA-2)
Running back	Eric Dickerson, Los Angeles Rams/Indianapolis Colts (AP, NEA, PFWA, PFW, TSN); Charles White, Los Angeles Rams (AP, PFWA, PFW, TSN); Curt Warner, Seattle Seahawks (NEA)	Curt Warner, Seattle Seahawks (AP-2); Charles White, Los Angeles Rams (NEA-2); Herschel Walker, Dallas Cowboys (AP-2, NEA-2)
Wide receiver	Jerry Rice, San Francisco 49ers (AP, NEA, PFWA, PFW, TSN); J. T. Smith, St. Louis Cardinals (PFW, TSN); Gary Clark, Washington Redskins (AP); Mike Quick, Philadelphia Eagles (NEA); Steve Largent, Seattle Seahawks (PFWA)	Steve Largent, Seattle Seahawks (AP-2, NEA-2); Gary Clark, Washington Redskins (NEA-2); J.T. Smith, St. Louis Cardinals (AP-2)
Tight end	Mark Bavaro, New York Giants (AP, NEA, PFWA, PFW, TSN)	Kellen Winslow, San Diego Chargers (AP-2); Robert Awalt, St. Louis Cardinals (NEA-2)
Tackle	Anthony Muñoz, Cincinnati Bengals (AP, PFWA, PFW); Gary Zimmerman, Minnesota Vikings (AP, NEA, PFWA, PFW); Jackie Slater, Los Angeles Rams (NEA); Joe Jacoby, Washington Redskins (NEA); Chris Hinton, Indianapolis Colts (TSN)	Jim Lachey, San Diego Chargers (AP-2); Jim Covert, Chicago Bears (NEA-2); Jackie Slater, Los Angeles Rams (AP-2); Gary Zimmerman, Minnesota Vikings (NEA-2)
Guard	Mike Munchak, Houston Oilers (AP, NEA, PFWA, PFW, TSN); Bill Fralic, Atlanta Falcons (AP, PFWA, PFW, TSN); Ron Solt, Indianapolis Colts (NEA)	Ron Solt, Indianapolis Colts (AP-2); Bill Fralic, Atlanta Falcons (NEA-2); Tom Newberry, Los Angeles Rams (AP-2); Keith Bishop, Denver Broncos (NEA-2)
Center	Dwight Stephenson, Miami Dolphins (AP, PFWA, PFW); Mike Webster, Pittsburgh Steelers (NEA); Jay Hilgenberg, Chicago Bears (TSN)	Ray Donaldson, Indianapolis Colts (AP-2, NEA-2)

Special teams
Position	First team	Second team
Kicker	Morten Andersen, New Orleans Saints (AP, NEA, PFWA, PFW, TSN)	Dean Biasucci, Indianapolis Colts (AP-2, NEA-2)
Punter	Jim Arnold, Detroit (AP, NEA, PFWA, PFW, TSN)	Ralf Mojsiejenko, San Diego Chargers (AP-2, NEA-2)
Kick Returner	Sylvester Stamps, Atlanta Falcons (PFW, TSN); Vai Sikahema, St. Louis Cardinals (AP); Dennis Gentry, Chicago Bears (PFWA)	Dennis Gentry, Chicago Bears (AP-2)
Punt Returner	Mel Gray, New Orleans Saints (PFWA, PFW, TSN)	
Special Teams	Ron Wolfley, St. Louis Cardinals (PFW)	

Defense
Position	First team	Second team
Defensive end	Bruce Smith, Buffalo Bills (AP, PFWA, PFW, TSN); Reggie White, Philadelphia Eagles (AP, NEA, PFWA, PFW, TSN); Chris Doleman, Minnesota Vikings (NEA)	Charles Mann, Washington Redskins (AP-2); Bruce Clark, New Orleans Saints (NEA-2); Bruce Smith, Buffalo Bills (NEA-2); Chris Doleman, Minnesota Vikings (AP-2)
Defensive tackle	Steve McMichael, Chicago Bears (AP, PFWA, PFW, TSN); Michael Carter, San Francisco 49ers (AP, NEA, PFWA, TSN); Bill Maas, Kansas City Chiefs (PFW)	Tim Krumrie, Cincinnati Bengals (AP-2); Keith Millard, Minnesota Vikings (AP-2); Bill Maas, Kansas City Chiefs (NEA-2)
Middle linebacker	Mike Singletary, Chicago Bears, (AP, PFWA, PFW, TSN); Fredd Young, Seattle Seahawks (AP, NEA, PFWA, PFW, TSN); Karl Mecklenburg, Denver Broncos (NEA)	Shane Conlan, Buffalo Bills (AP-2, NEA-2); Mike Singletary, Chicago Bears (NEA-2); Karl Mecklenburg, Denver Broncos (AP-2)
Outside linebacker	Andre Tippett, New England Patriots, (AP, PFWA, PFW); Carl Banks, New York Giants (AP, NEA, PFWA, TSN); Rickey Jackson, New Orleans Saints (NEA, TSN); Lawrence Taylor, New York Giants (PFW)	Duane Bickett, Indianapolis Colts (AP-2, NEA-2); Andre Tippett, New England Patriots (NEA-2); Lawrence Taylor, New York Giants (AP-2)
Cornerback	Hanford Dixon, Cleveland Browns (AP, NEA, PFWA, PFW, TSN); Frank Minnifield, Cleveland Browns (PFWA, PFW, TSN); Darrell Green, Washington Redskins (NEA); Barry Wilburn, Washington Redskins (AP)	Dave Waymer, New Orleans Saints (AP-2); Jerry Gray, Los Angeles Rams (NEA-2); Frank Minnifield, Cleveland Browns (AP-2)
Safety	Ronnie Lott, San Francisco 49ers (AP, PFWA, PFW, TSN); Joey Browner, Minnesota Vikings (AP, NEA, PFWA, PFW, TSN); Keith Bostic, Houston Oilers (NEA)	Kenny Easley, Seattle Seahawks (NEA-2); Dave Duerson, Chicago Bears (AP-2); Ronnie Lott, San Francisco 49ers (NEA-2); Keith Bostic, Houston Oilers (AP-2)

== Key ==
- AP = Associated Press first-team All-Pro
- AP-2 = Associated Press second-team All-Pro
- NEA = Newspaper Enterprise Association first-team All-Pro team
- NEA-2 = Newspaper Enterprise Association second-team All-Pro team
- PFW = Pro Football Weekly All-Pro team
- PFWA = Pro Football Writers Association All-NFL
- TSN = The Sporting News All-Pro
