= Mark Bellini =

American football player (born 1964)

No. 87
- Position: Wide receiver

Personal information
- Born: January 19, 1964 (age 62); San Leandro, California, U.S.
- Listed height: 5 ft 11 in (1.80 m)
- Listed weight: 185 lb (84 kg)

Career information
- High school: San Leandro (California)
- College: BYU
- NFL draft: 1987: 7th round, 170th overall pick

Career history
- Indianapolis Colts (1987–1988); Phoenix Cardinals (1989)*; Seattle Seahawks (1990)*
- * Offseason or practice squad member only

Awards and highlights
- National champion (1984); Second-Team All-American (1985)

Career NFL statistics
- Receptions: 10
- Receiving yards: 133
- Stats at Pro Football Reference

Mark Joseph Bellini (born January 19, 1964) is an American former professional football player who was a wide receiver in the National Football League (NFL).

Bellini was born in San Leandro, California and played scholastically at San Leandro High School. He played collegiately at BYU, where he was a second-team All-American as a junior, and a member of their national champion team as a senior.

Pre-draft measurables
Height	Weight	Arm length	Hand span	Bench press
5 ft 10 7/8 in (1.80 m)	178 lb (81 kg)	30 in (0.76 m)	9 in (0.23 m)	8 reps
All values from NFL Combine

Bellini was selected by the Indianapolis Colts in the seventh round of the 1987 NFL draft with the 170th overall pick. He spent two seasons with the Colts
