= Tommy Sims (American football) =

American football player (born 1964)

No. 45
- Position: Defensive back

Personal information
- Born: September 29, 1964 (age 62); Americus, Georgia, U.S.
- Listed height: 6 ft 0 in (1.83 m)
- Listed weight: 190 lb (86 kg)

Career information
- High school: Americus
- College: Tennessee
- NFL draft: 1986: 7th round, 190th overall pick

Career history
- Indianapolis Colts (1986)

Career NFL statistics
- Games played: 1
- Stats at Pro Football Reference

Thomas Edward Sims Jr. (born September 29, 1964) is an American former professional football player who was a defensive back in the National Football League (NFL). He played college football for the Tennessee Volunteers. He was selected in the seventh round with the 190th overall pick by and played for the Indianapolis Colts in the 1986 NFL draft. He appeared in one game, the 1986 regular season opener for the Colts.
