= Terry Nugent (American football) =

American football player (born 1961)

No. 14
- Position: Quarterback

Personal information
- Born: December 15, 1961 (age 64); Merced, California, U.S.
- Listed height: 6 ft 4 in (1.93 m)
- Listed weight: 218 lb (99 kg)

Career information
- High school: Elk Grove (Elk Grove, California)
- College: Colorado State
- NFL draft: 1984: 6th round, 158th overall pick

Career history
- Cleveland Browns (1984)*; Tampa Bay Buccaneers (1986)*; Indianapolis Colts (1987); Denver Broncos (1988)*
- * Offseason or practice squad member only

Career NFL statistics
- Passing yards: 47
- TD–INT: 0-0
- Passer rating: 91.2
- Stats at Pro Football Reference

Terrence John Nugent (born December 5, 1961) is an American former professional football player who was a quarterback for the Indianapolis Colts of the National Football League (NFL). He played college football for the Colorado State Rams. He was selected by the Cleveland Browns in the sixth round of the 1984 NFL draft.
