= Albert Bentley =

American football player (born 1960)

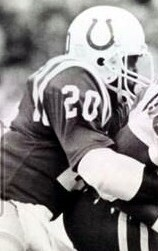
- Bentley in 1988

No. 20, 28
- Position: Running back

Personal information
- Born: August 15, 1960 (age 66); Immokalee, Florida, U.S.
- Listed height: 5 ft 11 in (1.80 m)
- Listed weight: 207 lb (94 kg)

Career information
- High school: Immokalee
- College: Miami (FL)
- Supplemental draft: 1984: 2nd round, 36th overall pick

Career history
- Michigan Panthers (1984); Oakland Invaders (1985); Indianapolis Colts (1985–1991); Pittsburgh Steelers (1992)

Awards and highlights
- National champion (1983); Second-team All-South Independent (1983)

Career NFL statistics
- Rushing attempts: 526
- Rushing yards: 2,355
- Average yards/attempt: 4.5
- Rushing touchdowns: 19
- Receptions: 226
- Receiving yards: 2,245
- Average yards/reception: 9.9
- Receiving touchdowns: 8
- Stats at Pro Football Reference

Albert Timothy Bentley (born August 15, 1960) is an American former professional football player who was a running back in the National Football League (NFL) and the United States Football League (USFL). Bentley began his professional career in the USFL with the Michigan Panthers and Oakland Invaders from 1984 to 1985. After the USFL folded, he played for the NFL's Indianapolis Colts and Pittsburgh Steelers from 1985 to 1992. Bentley played college football for the Miami Hurricanes.

== Early life ==
Albert Bentley was born on August 15, 1960, in Immokalee, Florida one of twelve children. He attended Immokalee High School where he was a tailback on the football team and a member of the wrestling and track and field teams. In his senior year, he was named Most Valuable Player on all three teams.

On the football team, Immokalee only won two games during Bentley's senior year. However, Bentley rushed for nearly 1,000 yards. He only received one football scholarship offer from Findlay University in Ohio. He declined that offer and chose to attend the University of Miami without a scholarship after speaking with then-head coach Lou Saban. Saban encouraged Bentley to try out and with the possibly of earning a scholarship.

== College career ==
Prior to Bentley's arrival, Saban left Miami following the 1978 season and was replaced by head coach Howard Schnellenberger. Bentley was a freshman walk-on at Miami in 1979, and saw limited playing time. In a Miami junior varsity game against Florida State, Bentley nearly returned a kickoff for a touchdown before a Florida State player came off the sidelines to tackle him near the end zone. The referees did not see the infraction, but the Miami coaching staff took notice of his playing ability. He saw varsity action as a kick returner throughout the rest of the season.

Bentley quit the football team during the 1980–81 season, opting to focus on his studies. He returned for the 1981 season, and again saw limited action as a non-scholarship player. He recorded 10 rushing attempts for 53 yards and nearly scored before fumbling the ball at the goal line. Most of Bentley's playing time came on kickoff and punt coverage.

In the spring of 1982, Schnellenberger offered Bentley a scholarship for his junior season. He shared fullback duties with Speedy Neal and recorded 64 carries for 247 yards and one touchdown.

In his senior season, Bentley became the Hurricanes' leading rusher with 144 attempts for 722 yards and five touchdowns. He also caught 32 passes for 294 yards and one touchdown. With quarterback Bernie Kosar and Bentley leading the team, the Hurricanes went 10–1 on the regular season finishing ranked #5 in the AP poll. They earned a place in the 1984 Orange Bowl against then-undefeated and #1-ranked Nebraska. In the third quarter, Bentley rushed for what became the winning touchdown of the Orange Bowl. Miami led 31–17 at the end of the third quarter, but Nebraska scored two touchdowns in the fourth quarter and opted for a two-point conversion on the final touchdown, which failed. Miami won 31–30 and were named consensus national champions with an 11–1 record.

Bentley was inducted into the University of Miami Sports Hall of Fame in 2007.

== Professional career ==
In January 1984, Bentley was selected by the Chicago Blitz with the seventh overall selection in the 1984 USFL draft. However, Bentley's contract negotiations with the Blitz stalled following the draft. As the 1984 USFL season got underway, the Blitz traded him to the Michigan Panthers who were looking to replace running back Ken Lacy after he moved to the NFL. Bentley signed with the Panthers and began his professional career in the USFL.

Bentley was later selected by the Indianapolis Colts in the second round (36th overall) of the 1984 NFL Supplemental Draft.

=== Michigan Panthers/Oakland Invaders (1984–1985) ===
Bentley signed with the Michigan Panthers on April 17, 1984, following week eight of the USFL season. Bentley was used mostly as a backup running back while also returning kickoffs for the remaining 10 games of the season. Bentley recorded 18 carries for 60 yards and returned 19 kickoffs for 425 yards on the year. The Panthers went 12–6 in the regular season and lost to the Los Angeles Express in the Divisional Round of the playoffs.

In 1985, the Panthers organization merged with the Oakland Invaders and continued playing under the Invaders name. Bentley stayed with Oakland, where he led the team with 191 rushes for 1,020 yards and four touchdowns, while adding 44 catches for 441 yards and three touchdowns. The Invaders went 13–4–1 on the regular season and defeated the Tampa Bay Bandits and Memphis Showboats in the playoffs to earn a spot in the 1985 USFL Championship Game. The Invaders lost 24–28 to the Baltimore Stars in what became the USFL's final game.

=== Indianapolis Colts (1985–1991) ===
Following the demise of the USFL, Bentley signed a contract with the Indianapolis Colts on September 3, 1985. The Colts had selected Bentley in the 1984 NFL Supplemental Draft and retained his NFL playing rights.

In his first year with the Colts, Bentley appeared in 15 games with 54 rushes for 288 yards and two touchdowns while returning 27 kickoffs for 674 yards and a career-high 25.0-yard average return. In week five against the Buffalo Bills, Bentley recorded his first 100-yard rushing performance in the NFL with 17 carries for 100 yards. Bentley scored one rushing touchdown each in the final two weeks of the season against the Tampa Bay Buccaneers and Houston Oilers, respectively. The Colts went 4–11 on the season.

In 1986, Bentley continued to serve as a backup to Randy McMillan, splitting time throughout the season with George Wonsley while also returning kickoffs. He recorded 73 carries for 351 yards and three touchdowns with 25 receptions for 230 yards. Bentley had 32 kick returns for 687 yards, averaging 21.5 yards per return. Bentley missed four games after being placed on injured reserve with a calf muscle injury, but still managed to be the Colts' second-leading rusher on the season. The Colts started the 1986 season at 0–13, firing head coach Rod Dowhower and replacing him with Ron Meyer. Meyer won the final three games, ending the Colts' season at 3–13.

In 1987, Bentley had his best statistical season in the NFL. However, a new Colts running back and the 1987 player's strike stood in his way. The NFL canceled all week three games and used replacement players for weeks four through six. At the conclusion of the strike, the Colts traded for running back Eric Dickerson. Bentley was Dickerson's backup for the remainder of the season, but still produced in the 12 games he appeared with 142 rushes for 631 yards and a career-high seven rushing touchdowns. He added 34 receptions for 447 yards and two touchdowns while also returning 22 kicks for 500 yards. The Colts won the AFC East Division at 9–6 and earned their first playoff appearance since moving to Indianapolis. They lost in the 1987-88 NFL playoffs Divisional Round 21–38 to the Cleveland Browns.

By 1988, Dickerson was taking the majority of the snaps at running back leaving Bentley to start only two games. Dickerson led the league in rushing, and Bentley found a complimentary role in the Colts' offense. He appeared in all 16 games with 45 carries for 230 yards and two touchdowns and added 26 receptions for 252 yards and one touchdown. As a kick returner, Bentley saw his largest career workload with 39 returns for 775 yards. The Colts finished with a 9–7 record, but missed the playoffs.

For the 1989 season, the Colts moved to a two-running back formation and Bentley saw an uptick in his playing time. He finished the season with 75 rushing attempts for 299 yards and one touchdown and had 52 receptions for 525 yards and three touchdowns. Bentley joined wide receivers Andre Rison and Bill Brooks as the first trio in Colts history to record 500 receiving yards each in one season. The Colts finished the season at 8-8.

In 1990, Bentley was again productive on the ground and had his best season as a pass catcher. He posted 137 carries for 556 yards and four touchdowns and added career-highs with a team-leading 71 receptions for 664 yards and two touchdowns. For the second consecutive season, Bentley was part of a trio of Colts receivers with over 500 yards, the others being Brooks and Jessie Hester. The Colts finished the season at 7–9.

In 1991, Bentley injured his shoulder in a preseason game against the Philadelphia Eagles. He missed week one, and upon his return in week two he suffered a knee injury against the Miami Dolphins. Bentley was placed on injured reserve and missed the rest of the 1991 season.

Bentley was prepared to take over the Colts starting role with the departure of Dickerson after the 1991 season. Bentley appeared in all four of the Colts 1992 preseason games, but with lingering doubts about his knee he was released on August 31, 1992.

=== Pittsburgh Steelers (1992) ===
Bentley signed with the Pittsburgh Steelers on September 16, 1992. Bentley returned one kickoff for 17 yards in two appearances with the Steelers before being released on November 16, 1992.

== Professional career statistics ==
=== USFL statistics ===
Year	Team	Games		Rushing					Receiving					Kick returns				
Year	Team	GP	GS	Att	Yds	Avg	Lng	TD	Rec	Yds	Avg	Lng	TD	KR	Yds	Avg	Lng	TD
1984	MIP	8	1	18	60	3.3	16	0	2	7	3.5	4	0	19	425	22.4	40	0
1985	OAK	18	–	191	1,020	5.3	57	4	42	441	10.5	33	3	7	177	25.3	38	0
Career		26	1	209	1,080	5.2	57	4	44	448	10.2	33	3	26	602	23.2	40	0

=== NFL statistics ===
Year	Team	Games		Rushing					Receiving					Kick returns				
Year	Team	GP	GS	Att	Yds	Avg	Lng	TD	Rec	Yds	Avg	Lng	TD	KR	Yds	Avg	Lng	TD
1985	IND	15	1	54	288	5.3	26	2	11	85	7.7	16	0	27	674	25.0	48	0
1986	IND	12	3	73	251	4.8	70	3	25	230	9.2	38	0	32	687	21.5	37	0
1987	IND	12	4	142	631	4.4	17	7	34	447	13.1	72	2	22	500	22.7	45	0
1988	IND	16	2	45	230	5.1	20	2	26	252	9.7	21	1	39	775	19.9	40	0
1989	IND	16	8	75	299	4.0	22	1	52	525	10.1	61	3	17	328	19.3	29	0
1990	IND	16	15	137	556	4.1	26	4	71	664	9.4	73	2	11	211	19.2	36	0
1991	IND	1	0	0	0	–	0	0	7	42	6.0	11	0	–	–	–	–	–
1992	PIT	2	0	0	0	–	0	0	0	0	–	0	0	1	17	17.0	17	0
Career		90	33	526	2,355	4.5	70	19	226	2,245	9.9	73	8	149	3192	21.4	48	0

== Personal life ==
Bentley returned to Florida upon retiring from the NFL. He lives in Naples, Florida where he works as a financial consultant.
