= Ed Grimsley =

American football player (1963-2026)

No. 56
- Position: Linebacker

Personal information
- Born: March 22, 1963; Canton, Ohio, U.S.
- Died: March 8, 2025 (aged 61)
- Listed height: 6 ft 0 in (1.83 m)
- Listed weight: 235 lb (107 kg)

Career information
- High school: McKinley (Canton)
- College: Akron (1981–1985)
- NFL draft: 1986: undrafted

Career history
- Indianapolis Colts (1987)
- Stats at Pro Football Reference

Edward Paul Grimsley (March 22, 1963 – March 8, 2025) was an American professional football player who was a linebacker for one season with the Indianapolis Colts of the National Football League (NFL). He played college football for the Akron Zips.

== Early life ==
Edward Paul Grimsley was born on March 22, 1963, in Canton, Ohio. He attended Canton McKinley High School in Canton. He was a team captain in high school.

== College career ==
Grimsley was a member of the Akron Zips of the University of Akron from 1981 to 1985. He was a letterman in 1981, 1982, 1983, and 1985. He started the final five games of his freshman year in 1981, posting 48 solo tackles and 45 assisted tackles overall that season. Grimsley earned All-Ohio Valley Conference and honorable mention All-American honors in 1982. He also missed two games that year due to a broken ankle. He missed six games in 1983 as well after fracturing and dislocating his left elbow. He played in the first two games of the 1984 season but was then medically redshirted with a foot injury. Grimsley was named an honorable mention Associated Press All-American his redshirt senior year in 1985.

== Professional career ==
After going undrafted in the 1986 NFL draft, Grimsley signed with the Indianapolis Colts a year later on May 11, 1987. He was released on August 31. On September 23, he was signed by the Colts again during the 1987 NFL players strike. Grimsley remained with the team after the strike ended. Overall, he played in five games, starting three, for the Colts that year, recording one sack and one fumble recovery. He was then placed on injured reserve on November 2, 1987. Grimsley was released on August 3, 1988.

== Personal life ==
Grimsley's brother John also played in the NFL. Another brother, Willard, played at Eastern Michigan University. Ed died on March 8, 2025.
