= Steve Jordan (placekicker) =

American football player (born 1963)

No. 6
- Position: Kicker

Personal information
- Born: March 20, 1963 (age 63); San Francisco, California, U.S.
- Listed height: 5 ft 10 in (1.78 m)
- Listed weight: 205 lb (93 kg)

Career information
- High school: Archbishop Riordan (San Francisco)
- College: USC
- NFL draft: 1985: undrafted

Career history
- San Francisco 49ers (1985)*; Los Angeles Rams (1986)*; Indianapolis Colts (1987)
- * Offseason or practice squad member only
- Stats at Pro Football Reference

Stephen Bernard Jordan (born March 20, 1963) is an American former professional football player who was a kicker for the Indianapolis Colts of the National Football League (NFL). He played college football for the USC Trojans.
