= Mark Boggs =

American football player (born 1964)

No. 60
- Position: Offensive tackle

Personal information
- Born: May 7, 1964 (age 62); Kankakee, Illinois, U.S.
- Listed height: 6 ft 5 in (1.96 m)
- Listed weight: 301 lb (137 kg)

Career information
- High school: Bradley-Bourbonnais Community (Bradley, Illinois)
- College: Ball State
- NFL draft: 1987: undrafted

Career history
- Los Angeles Rams (1987)*; Indianapolis Colts (1987)
- * Offseason or practice squad member only

Career NFL statistics
- Games played: 1
- Stats at Pro Football Reference

Mark Allen Boggs (born May 7, 1964) is an American former professional football player who was an offensive tackle for one game with the Indianapolis Colts of the National Football League (NFL). He played college football for the Ball State Cardinals. He was a replacement player for the Colts during the 1987 NFL strike before retiring from professional football to open a fitness center.
