= Roy Banks =

American football player (born 1965)

No. 86
- Position: Wide receiver

Personal information
- Born: November 29, 1965 (age 60); Detroit, Michigan, U.S.
- Listed height: 5 ft 10 in (1.78 m)
- Listed weight: 190 lb (86 kg)

Career information
- High school: Martin Luther King
- College: Eastern Illinois
- NFL draft: 1987: 5th round, 114th overall pick

Career history
- Indianapolis Colts (1987–1989); Buffalo Bills (1990)*
- * Offseason or practice squad member only
- Stats at Pro Football Reference

Roy Fitzpatrick Banks (born February 19, 1965) is an American former professional football wide receiver who played for the Indianapolis Colts of the National Football League (NFL). He was selected 114th overall by the Colts in the fifth round of the 1987 NFL draft. He played college football at Eastern Illinois University.

Pre-draft measurables
Height	Weight	Arm length	Hand span	40-yard dash	10-yard split	20-yard split	20-yard shuttle	Vertical jump	Broad jump	Bench press
5 ft 10 1/8 in (1.78 m)	188 lb (85 kg)	32 in (0.81 m)	9 1/2 in (0.24 m)	4.52 s	1.54 s	2.61 s	4.26 s	32.0 in (0.81 m)	9 ft 6 in (2.90 m)	4 reps
All values from NFL Combine
