= John Brandes =

American football player (born 1964)

No. 88, 82, 83, 85
- Position: Tight end

Personal information
- Born: April 2, 1964 (age 62); Fort Riley, Kansas, U.S.
- Listed height: 6 ft 2 in (1.88 m)
- Listed weight: 249 lb (113 kg)

Career information
- High school: Arlington-Lamar (Arlington, Texas)
- College: Cameron
- NFL draft: 1987: undrafted

Career history
- Indianapolis Colts (1987–1989); Washington Redskins (1990–1992); New York Giants (1992); San Francisco 49ers (1993)

Awards and highlights
- Super Bowl champion (XXVI)

Career NFL statistics
- Receptions: 5
- Receiving yards: 35
- Return yards: 10
- Stats at Pro Football Reference

John Wesley Brandes (born April 2, 1964) is an American former professional football player who was a tight end and long snapper in the National Football League (NFL) for the Indianapolis Colts, Washington Redskins, New York Giants, and San Francisco 49ers. He played college football for the Cameron Aggies.
