= Walter Murray (gridiron football) =

American gridiron football player (born 1962)

No. 86, 84, 83
- Position: Wide receiver

Personal information
- Born: December 13, 1962 (age 63); Berkeley, California, U.S.
- Listed height: 6 ft 4 in (1.93 m)
- Listed weight: 200 lb (91 kg)

Career information
- High school: Berkeley
- College: Hawaii (1982–1985)
- NFL draft: 1986: 2nd round, 45th overall pick

Career history
- Indianapolis Colts (1986–1987); San Francisco 49ers (1989)*; Edmonton Eskimos (1989); Hamilton Tiger-Cats (1990)
- * Offseason or practice squad member only

Awards and highlights
- First-team All-American (1985)

Career NFL statistics
- Receptions: 22
- Receiving yards: 373
- Touchdowns: 3
- Stats at Pro Football Reference

Walter Clyde Murray Jr. (born December 13, 1962) is an American former professional football player who was a wide receiver in the National Football League (NFL). He played college football at Hawaii.

== Early life ==
Walter Clyde Murray Jr. was born on December 13, 1962, in Berkeley, California. He attended Berkeley High School in Berkely. While at Berkeley High, he set a national record in the 300-meter hurdles with a time of 35.79 seconds. Murray was also part of the Berkeley High mile relay team that set a national record with 3:08.

== College career ==
Murray was a four-year letterman for the Hawaii Rainbow Warriors of the University of Hawaiʻi at Mānoa from 1982 to 1985. He caught 31 passes for 494 yards and five touchdowns in 1982, 44 passes for 773 yards and seven touchdowns in 1983, 37 passes for 625 yards and one touchdown in 1984, and 66 passes for 973 yards and seven touchdowns in 1985. His 66 receptions and seven receiving touchdowns in 1985 set single-season school records. Murray also returned nine kickoffs for 172 yards and rushed 22 times for 102 yards during his college career. As a senior in 1985, he was named a third-team All-American by the Associated Press and a first-team All-American by Gannett News Service.

== Professional career ==
Murray was selected by the Washington Redskins in the second round, with the 45th overall pick, of the 1986 NFL draft. He did not immediately sign with the Redskins however. The Redskins were only offering a signing bonus if Murray made the final roster but Murray but wanted the bonus immediately upon signing. On October 7, 1986, Murray, his agent, Redskins general manager Bobby Beathard, Indianapolis Colts owner Bob Irsay, and Colts general counsel Mike Chernoff all met at Irsay's office in Skokie, Illinois. Murray signed with the Redskins, whom then traded him to the Colts for Indianapolis' 1987 second-round pick. After informing the NFL of the trade, the Colts tore up Murray's Washington contract and signed him to a new deal. He played in five games for the Colts during the 1986 season, catching two passes for 34 yards. Murray appeared in 14 games, starting three, in 1987, recording 20 receptions for 339 yards and three touchdowns. He also played in one playoff game that year and caught one pass for 25 yards. He was released by the Colts on August 30, 1988.

Murray signed with the San Francisco 49ers on February 28, 1989. He was later released on September 2, 1989.

On September 22, 1989, it was reported that he had been signed to the practice roster of the Edmonton Eskimos of the Canadian Football League (CFL). He was later promoted to the active roster and dressed in five games during the 1989 CFL season, catching eight passes for 121 yards and two touchdowns.

In June 1990, Murray and Melvin Houston were traded to the Hamilton Tiger-Cats for "future considerations". However both head coaches admitted that the trade was actually compensation for the Eskimos having signed former Tiger-Cats multi-time All-Star Mike Walker, despite no compensation having been required anyway. CFL rules stated that any player who completes his contract is free to sign with any team. Eskimos coach Joe Faragalli said "They're happy and we feel good about compensating them." Murray dressed in two games for the Tiger-Cats in 1990, totaling four catches for 74 yards and two tackles.
