= Dean Biasucci =

American football player (born 1962)

No. 5, 4
- Position: Placekicker

Personal information
- Born: July 25, 1962 (age 64); Niagara Falls, New York, U.S.
- Listed height: 6 ft 0 in (1.83 m)
- Listed weight: 189 lb (86 kg)

Career information
- High school: Miramar (Miramar, Florida)
- College: Western Carolina
- NFL draft: 1984: undrafted

Career history
- Atlanta Falcons (1984)*; Indianapolis Colts (1984–1994); Pittsburgh Steelers (1995)*; St. Louis Rams (1995)
- * Offseason or practice squad member only

Awards and highlights
- 2× All-Pro (1987, 1988); Pro Bowl (1987); 3× First-team All-SoCon (1981, 1982, 1983)

Career NFL statistics
- Field goals attempted: 262
- Field goals made: 185
- Field goal %: 70.6
- Stats at Pro Football Reference

Dean Biasucci (born July 25, 1962) is an American former professional football player who was a placekicker in the National Football League (NFL) for the Indianapolis Colts and the St. Louis Rams. He played college football for the Western Carolina Catamounts.

== Early life ==
Biasucci played college football for the Western Carolina Catamounts, and was a member of the team that reached the 1983 NCAA Division I-AA Football Championship Game.

He scored 280 points (conference record) on 57 of 93 field goal attempts and 109 of 113 extra point attempts. His longest field goal was 52 yards and 80 percent of his kickoffs landed in the end zone. He was three-time first-team All-Southern Conference selection.

== Professional career ==
Biasucci was signed as an undrafted free agent by the Atlanta Falcons after the 1984 NFL draft. He played in one preseason game, making a 37-yard field goal attempt against the Minnesota Vikings. He was released before the start of the season on August 14.

On September 7, he was signed by the Indianapolis Colts to replace an injured Raul Allegre. Biasucci was the team's field goal kicker for four games and would remain the rest of the season as the kickoff specialist.

In 1985, he lost the placekicking competition against Allegre. He was released before the start of the season on August 27 and did not catch on with another team that year. In 1986, he was signed to participate in Colts training camp. He would pass Allegre on the depth chart and win the placekicker position.

Biasucci is the third all-time leading scorer for the Colts, collecting 783 points from 1984 to 1994.

== Personal life ==
Biasucci became an actor after his retirement, portraying himself in Jerry Maguire and receiving roles in other smaller movies such as New Alcatraz. He also had small guest appearances on ER and The West Wing. Biasucci was also a charter guest during an episode of the Bravo network reality show Below Deck Mediterranean.
