= Matt Bouza =

American football player (born 1958)

No. 81, 85
- Position: Wide receiver

Personal information
- Born: April 8, 1958 (age 68); San Jose, California, U.S.
- Listed height: 6 ft 3 in (1.91 m)
- Listed weight: 211 lb (96 kg)

Career information
- High school: Jesuit (Carmichael, California)
- College: California
- NFL draft: 1981: undrafted

Career history
- San Francisco 49ers (1981); Baltimore/Indianapolis Colts (1982–1989)

Career NFL statistics
- Receptions: 234
- Receiving yards: 3,064
- Receiving touchdowns: 17
- Stats at Pro Football Reference

Matthew Kyle Bouza (/ˈbuːzə/ BOO-zə; born April 8, 1958) is an American former professional football player in the National Football League (NFL), who played wide receiver for nine seasons, mainly with the Baltimore/Indianapolis Colts. Bouza played college football for the California Golden Bears.

== Early life ==
Matt Bouza was born on April 8, 1958, in San Jose, California. He attended Jesuit High School in Carmichael, California, a suburb of Sacramento. Bouza began his high school career as a quarterback before moving to tight end and defensive back, earning all-area honors for his defensive play.

== College career ==
Bouza received several scholarship offers, but chose to walk-on at the University of California, Berkeley. He was converted to wide receiver, and saw limited special teams action as a freshman. Bouza chose to redshirt in 1977 and in 1978 he earned a starting spot. However, his season was cut short after three games when he suffered a knee injury that sidelined him for the remaining games.

Bouza's junior season was his most productive, with 59 receptions for 831 yards and five touchdowns. He finished second in the Pac-10 Conference in receptions and seventh in NCAA Division I that season. As a senior, Bouza recorded 44 receptions for 651 yards and two touchdowns. He finished his college career with 111 receptions for 1,682 yards and 10 touchdowns, which was then the third highest career receiving total in Cal history.

== Professional career ==
=== San Francisco 49ers (1981) ===
Bouza went undrafted in the 1981 NFL draft, but was signed as a free agent by the San Francisco 49ers on May 8, 1981. Bouza was cut by the 49ers on August 31, 1981, but was re-signed the following day. Bouza was cut again following the 49ers week one game against the Detroit Lions.

The 49ers went 13–3 on the season, capped by winning Super Bowl XVI.

=== Baltimore/Indianapolis Colts (1982–1989) ===
Bouza was signed by the Baltimore Colts prior to the 1982 NFL season. Bouza spent the next eight seasons playing for the Colts, with two seasons in Baltimore before the Colts moved to Indianapolis prior to the 1984 NFL season.

Bouza's first NFL touchdown came in week 15 of the strike shortened 1982 NFL season. Bouza caught a 12-yard pass from quarterback Mike Pagel in a game that finished as a 20–20 tie against the Green Bay Packers.

Bouza's best statistical season was in 1986. Despite the Colts 3–13 record, Bouza led the team in receiving with 71 receptions for 830 yards and five touchdowns. In 93 appearances with the Colts, Bouza recorded 234 receptions for 3,064 yards and 17 touchdowns.
