= 1983 Baltimore Colts season =

31st season in franchise history; final one in Baltimore

- Owner: Robert Irsay
- General manager: Ernie Accorsi
- Head coach: Frank Kush
- Home stadium: Memorial Stadium

Results
- Record: 7–9
- Division place: T-4th AFC East
- Playoffs: Did not qualify
- Pro Bowlers: G Chris Hinton

The 1983 Baltimore Colts season was the 31st season for the team in the National Football League (NFL). This would be the franchise's final season in Baltimore as they moved to Indianapolis for the following season. The Colts finished the year with a record of 7 wins and 9 losses, and tied for fourth in the AFC East division with the New York Jets. However, the Colts finished ahead of New York based on better conference record (5–9 to Jets’ 4–8).

Having finished the 1982 season with the NFL's worst record at a winless 0–8–1, the Colts held the No. 1 pick in the 1983 NFL draft and expected to land the nation's top collegiate player to their 1983 roster. The Colts used the top pick on John Elway of Stanford. Elway, however, refused to play for the Colts and even considered joining the New York Yankees baseball organization unless he was traded. The Colts were forced to trade Elway to the Denver Broncos and Mike Pagel retained his position as starting quarterback. The Elway controversy became more interesting when Elway's Broncos visited Baltimore for the second game of the season. The Broncos won that game 17–10. Later, when the teams faced each other again in Denver for the second-to-last game of the season, the Colts took a 19–0 lead over the Broncos, only to blow the lead in the fourth quarter and lose 21–19. They won their final game as a Baltimore team against the Houston Oilers 20–10. The Colts' desertion left Baltimore without an NFL team until the Ravens began play in 1996. Professional football was reintroduced to the Baltimore market in 1994 with the creation of the Baltimore Stallions Canadian Football League team during what was essentially an ill-fated American expansion. From 1981 to this season, the Colts went a combined 9–31–1 (.232).

== Offseason ==
=== NFL draft ===
1983 Baltimore Colts draft
| Round | Pick | Player | Position | College | Notes |
| 1 | 1 | John Elway | Quarterback | Stanford | traded to the Denver Broncos |
| 2 | 29 | Vernon Maxwell | Linebacker | Arizona State | |
| 3 | 57 | George Achica | Nose tackle | USC | |
| 4 | 85 | Phil Smith | Wide receiver | San Diego State | |
| 5 | 113 | Sid Abramowitz | Offensive tackle | Tulsa | |
| 6 | 161 | Grant Feasel | Center | Abilene Christian | |
| 7 | 169 | Alvin Moore | Running back | Arizona State | |
| 9 | 225 | Jim Mills | Offensive tackle | Hawaii | |
| 9 | 241 | Chris Rose | Offensive tackle | Stanford | |
| 10 | 252 | Ronald Hopkins | Defensive back | Murray State | |
| 11 | 280 | Jim Bob Taylor | Quarterback | Georgia Tech | |
| 12 | 308 | Carl Williams | Wide receiver | Texas Southern | |
Made roster * Made at least one Pro Bowl during career

=== Undrafted free agents ===
1983 undrafted free agents of note
| Player | Position | College |
|---|---|---|
| John Miller | Linebacker | Mississippi State |

== Personnel ==
=== Staff ===
1983 Baltimore Colts staff
| Front office: President and treasurer – Robert Irsay; General manager – Ernie Accorsi; Director of player personnel – Jack Bushofsky; Director of pro personnel – Bob Terpening; Head coaches: Head coach – Frank Kush; Offensive coaches: Offensive coordinator/quarterbacks – Zeke Bratkowski; Running backs – Roger Theder; Receivers – Richard Mann; Tight ends – Mike Westhoff; Offensive line – Hal Hunter | Defensive coaches: Defensive line – Gunther Cunningham; Linebackers – Rick Venturi; Secondary – Bob Valesente; Special teams coaches: Special teams – Mike Westhoff |

=== Roster ===
1983 Baltimore Colts roster
| Quarterbacks (QB): 9 Mark Herrmann; 18 Mike Pagel; 8 Mark Reed; 12 Jim Bob Taylor; Running backs (RB): 33 Curtis Dickey; 32 Randy McMillan; 23 Alvin Moore; 20 Ricky Porter; 39 Newton Williams; Wide receivers (WR): 88 Bernard Henry; 84 Victor Oatis; 87 Tracy Porter; 89 Aundra Thompson; Tight ends (TE): 81 Pat Beach; 83 Tim Sherwin; 86 Dave Young | Offensive linemen (OL): 74 Sid Abramowitz T; 76 Karl Baldischwiler T; 53 Ray Donaldson C; 50 Grant Feasel C; 68 Jeff Hart T; 75 Chris Hinton G; 79 Lindsey Mason T; 64 Ben Utt G; 73 Steve Wright G; Defensive linemen (DL): 97 Quinton Ballard NT; 90 Mark Bell DE; 78 Steve Parker DE; 99 Donnell Thompson DE; 71 Henry Waechter DE; 69 Leo Wisniewski NT | Linebackers (LB): 52 Greg Bracelin OLB; 98 Johnie Cooks ILB; 51 Ricky Jones OLB; 55 Barry Krauss ILB; 56 Vernon Maxwell OLB; 49 Cliff Odom ILB; 60 Gary Padjen ILB; 54 Sanders Shiver OLB; Defensive backs (DB): 26 Kim Anderson FS; 30 Larry Anderson SS; 45 Jim Burroughs CB; 34 Jeff Delaney SS; 25 Nesby Glasgow FS; 29 Mark Kafentzis SS; 35 Tate Randle CB; 44 Kendall Williams CB; Special teams (ST): 2 Raúl Allegre K; 3 Rohn Stark P | Reserve: 85 Matt Bouza WR (IR); 80 Ray Butler WR (IR); 57 Mike Humiston LB (IR); 76 Jim Mills T (IR); 10 Art Schlichter QB (Susp.); -- John Sinnott T (IR); 86 Phil Smith WR (IR); Rookies in italics |

== Regular season ==
=== Schedule ===
| Week | Date | Opponent | Result | Record | Venue | Attendance |
|---|---|---|---|---|---|---|
| 1 | September 4 | at **New England Patriots** | **W** 29–23 (OT) | 1–0 | Sullivan Stadium | 45,526 |
| 2 | September 11 | Denver Broncos | **L** 10–17 | 1–1 | Memorial Stadium | 52,613 |
| 3 | September 18 | at **Buffalo Bills** | **L** 23–28 | 1–2 | Rich Stadium | 40,937 |
| 4 | September 25 | Chicago Bears | **W** 22–19 (OT) | 2–2 | Memorial Stadium | 34,350 |
| 5 | October 2 | at Cincinnati Bengals | **W** 34–31 | 3–2 | Riverfront Stadium | 48,104 |
| 6 | October 9 | **New England Patriots** | **W** 12–7 | 4–2 | Memorial Stadium | 35,618 |
| 7 | October 16 | **Buffalo Bills** | **L** 7–30 | 4–3 | Memorial Stadium | 38,565 |
| 8 | October 23 | **Miami Dolphins** | **L** 7–21 | 4–4 | Memorial Stadium | 32,343 |
| 9 | October 30 | at Philadelphia Eagles | **W** 22–21 | 5–4 | Veterans Stadium | 59,150 |
| 10 | November 6 | at **New York Jets** | **W** 17–14 | 6–4 | Shea Stadium | 53,323 |
| 11 | November 13 | Pittsburgh Steelers | **L** 13–24 | 6–5 | Memorial Stadium | 57,319 |
| 12 | November 20 | at **Miami Dolphins** | **L** 0-37 | 6–6 | Miami Orange Bowl | 54,482 |
| 13 | November 27 | at Cleveland Browns | **L** 23–41 | 6–7 | Cleveland Municipal Stadium | 65,812 |
| 14 | December 4 | **New York Jets** | **L** 6–10 | 6–8 | Memorial Stadium | 35,462 |
| 15 | December 11 | at Denver Broncos | **L** 19–21 | 6–9 | Mile High Stadium | 74,864 |
| 16 | December 18 | Houston Oilers | **W** 20–10 | 7–9 | Memorial Stadium | 20,418 |
Note: Intra-division opponents are in **bold** text.

=== Game summaries ===
==== Week 1 ====
| Team | 1 | 2 | 3 | 4 | OT | Total |
|---|---|---|---|---|---|---|
| • Colts | 3 | 10 | 7 | 3 | 6 | 29 |
| Patriots | 0 | 13 | 3 | 7 | 0 | 23 |

- Date: September 4
- Location: Sullivan Stadium, Foxboro, Massachusetts
- Game start: 1:00 p.m.
- Game weather: 78 °F (25.6 °C), wind 10 miles per hour (16 km/h; 8.7 kn)
- TV announcers (NBC): Don Criqui and Jim Turner

Scoring summary
| Q1 | BAL | Raúl Allegre 25 yard field goal | IND 3–0 |
| Q2 | NE | Stephen Starring 73 yard pass from Steve Grogan (kick failed) | NE 6–3 |
| Q2 | NE | Stanley Morgan 50 yard pass from Steve Grogan (John Smith kick) | NE 13–3 |
| Q2 | BAL | Bernard Henry 16 yard pass from Mike Pagel (Raúl Allegre kick) | NE 13–10 |
| Q2 | BAL | Raúl Allegre 52 yard field goal | Tie 13–13 |
| Q3 | NE | John Smith 39 yard field goal | NE 16–13 |
| Q3 | BAL | Bernard Henry 5 yard pass from Mike Pagel (Raúl Allegre kick) | BAL 20–16 |
| Q4 | NE | Robert Weathers 9 yard run (John Smith kick) | NE 23–20 |
| Q4 | BAL | Raúl Allegre 33 yard field goal | Tie 23–23 |
| Q4 | BAL | Johnie Cooks 52 yard fumble return | BAL 29–23 |

==== Week 15 at Broncos ====
Week Fifteen: Baltimore Colts (6–8) at Denver Broncos (8–6)

| Quarter | 1 | 2 | 3 | 4 | Total |
|---|---|---|---|---|---|
| Colts | 3 | 13 | 3 | 0 | **19** |
| **Broncos** | 0 | 0 | 0 | 21 | **21** |

at Mile High Stadium, Denver, Colorado

- Date: December 11, 1983
- Game time: 4:00 p.m. EST
- Game weather: 40 °F (4.4 °C)
- Game attendance: 74,864

Game information

**First quarter**

- BAL – Raúl Allegre 42-yard field goal, 1:20. Colts 3–0. Drive:

**Second quarter**

- BAL – Raúl Allegre 55-yard field goal, 10:55. Colts 6–0. Drive:
- BAL – Raúl Allegre 41-yard field goal, 7:23. Colts 9–0. Drive:
- BAL – Bernard Henry 40-yard pass from Mike Pagel (Raúl Allegre kick), 5:55. Colts 16–0. Drive:

**Third quarter**

- BAL – Raúl Allegre 26-yard field goal, 7:50. Colts 19–0. Drive:

**Fourth quarter**

- DEN – Clint Sampson 21-yard pass from John Elway (Rich Karlis kick), 10:52. Colts 19–7. Drive:
- DEN – Jesse Myles 26-yard pass from John Elway (Rich Karlis kick), 4:54. Colts 19–14. Drive:
- DEN – Gerald Willhite 26-yard pass from John Elway (Rich Karlis kick), 0:44. Broncos 21–19. Drive:

Top passers

- BAL – Mike Pagel – 13/27, 217 yards, TD, INT
- DEN – John Elway – 23/44, 345 yards, 3 TD

Top rushers

- BAL – Curtis Dickey – 19 rushes, 92 yards
- DEN – John Elway – 3 rushes, 23 yards

Top receivers

- BAL – Bernard Henry – 8 receptions, 169 yards, TD
- DEN – Steve Watson – 4 receptions, 98 yards

=== Standings ===
AFC East
| | W | L | T | PCT | DIV | CONF | PF | PA | STK |
|---|---|---|---|---|---|---|---|---|---|
| Miami Dolphins^{(2)} | 12 | 4 | 0 | .750 | 6–2 | 9–3 | 389 | 250 | W5 |
| New England Patriots | 8 | 8 | 0 | .500 | 4–4 | 6–6 | 274 | 289 | L1 |
| Buffalo Bills | 8 | 8 | 0 | .500 | 4–4 | 7–5 | 283 | 351 | L2 |
| Baltimore Colts | 7 | 9 | 0 | .438 | 3–5 | 5–9 | 264 | 354 | W1 |
| New York Jets | 7 | 9 | 0 | .438 | 3–5 | 4–8 | 313 | 331 | L2 |

== See also ==
- History of the Indianapolis Colts
- Indianapolis Colts seasons
- Colts–Patriots rivalry
