= 1984 Indianapolis Colts season =

32nd season in franchise history; first in Indianapolis

- Owner: Robert Irsay
- General manager: Jim Irsay
- Head coach: Frank Kush
- Home stadium: Hoosier Dome

Results
- Record: 4–12
- Division place: 4th AFC East
- Playoffs: Did not qualify

The 1984 Indianapolis Colts season was the 32nd season for the team in the National Football League (NFL) and first in Indianapolis, as they relocated from Baltimore after the 1983 NFL season. The Colts finished the year with a record of 4 wins and 12 losses, and fourth in the AFC East division. In their inaugural game in Indianapolis, they lost 23–14 to the New York Jets and did not win their first game there until week 5, when they defeated the Buffalo Bills 31–17. The Colts lost five games in a row (including one to the Bills, who started the season 0–11 and finished 2–14) to end the season. They missed the playoffs for the seventh consecutive season.

The Colts' 2,107 passing yards and 4,132 total yards gained on offense were the fewest in the league in 1984.

== Offseason ==
=== NFL draft ===
1984 Indianapolis Colts draft
Round	Pick	Player	Position	College	Notes
1	8	Leonard Coleman	Cornerback	Vanderbilt	
1	19	Ron Solt *	Guard	Maryland	
2	35	Blaise Winter	Defensive tackle	Syracuse	
3	66	Chris Scott	Defensive tackle	Purdue	
4	93	Craig Curry	Cornerback	Texas	
4	103	George Wonsley	Running back	Mississippi State	
5	120	Golden Tate	Wide receiver	Tennessee State	
5	130	Kevin Call	Tackle	Colorado State	
6	147	Dwight Beverly	Running back	Illinois	
8	205	Eugene Daniel	Cornerback	LSU	
11	290	Bob Stowe	Tackle	Illinois	
12	317	Steve Hathaway	Defensive end	West Virginia	
Made roster * Made at least one Pro Bowl during career

== Personnel ==
=== Staff ===
1984 Indianapolis Colts staff
Front office: President and treasurer – Robert Irsay; Vice-president and general manager – Jim Irsay; Assistant general manager – Bob Terpening; Director of player personnel – Jack Bushofsky; Head coaches: Head coach – Frank Kush; Offensive coaches: Offensive coordinator/quarterbacks – Zeke Bratkowski; Running backs – Roger Theder; Receivers – Richard Mann; Tight ends – Mike Westhoff; Offensive line – Hal Hunter	Defensive coaches: Defensive line – Gunther Cunningham; Linebackers – Rick Venturi; Secondary – George Catavolos; Special teams coaches: Special teams – Mike Westhoff; Strength and conditioning: Strength and Conditioning – Tom Zupancic

=== Roster ===
1984 Indianapolis Colts roster
Quarterbacks (QB): 9 Mark Herrmann; 18 Mike Pagel; 10 Art Schlichter; Running backs (RB): 32 Randy McMillan; 43 Frank Middleton; 23 Alvin Moore; 34 George Wonsley; Wide receivers (WR): 85 Matt Bouza; 80 Ray Butler; 88 Bernard Henry; 87 Tracy Porter; 86 Phil Smith; Tight ends (TE): 48 Mark Bell; 83 Tim Sherwin; 86 Dave Young	Offensive linemen (OL): 61 Don Bailey C; 72 Kevin Call T; 53 Ray Donaldson C; 63 Mark Kirchner T; 76 Jim Mills T; 71 Ted Petersen T; 66 Ron Solt G; 64 Ben Utt G; 73 Steve Wright T; Defensive linemen (DL): 95 Chris Scott DE; 91 Byron Smith DE; 99 Donnell Thompson DE; 94 Scott Virkus DE; 92 Brad White NT; 96 Blaise Winter DE	Linebackers (LB): 52 Greg Bracelin OLB; 98 Johnie Cooks OLB; 57 Mike Humiston ILB; 55 Barry Krauss ILB; 56 Vernon Maxwell OLB; 98 Cliff Odom ILB; 90 Gary Padjen ILB; Defensive backs (DB): 30 Larry Anderson SS; 38 Eugene Daniel CB; 27 Preston Davis CB; 25 Nesby Glasgow FS; 29 Mark Kafentzis SS; 28 Bo Metcalf CB; 21 George Radachowsky FS; 35 Tate Randle CB; 41 Vaughn Williams SS; Special teams (ST): 2 Raúl Allegre K; 5 Dean Biasucci K; 3 Rohn Stark P	Reserve: -- Karl Baldischwiler T (IR); 81 Pat Beach TE (IR); 45 Jim Burroughs CB (IR); 33 Curtis Dickey RB (IR); 79 Andy Ekern T (IR); 65 Ellis Gardner T/G (IR); 56 Steve Hathaway LB (IR); 75 Chris Hinton T (IR); 51 Ricky Jones LB (IR); 84 Victor Oatis WR (IR); 78 Steve Parker DE (IR); 39 Newton Williams RB (IR); 69 Leo Wisniewski NT (IR); Rookies in italics

== Schedule ==
Week	Date	Opponent	Result	Record	Venue	Attendance
1	September 2	**New York Jets**	**L** 14–23	0–1	Hoosier Dome	61,148
2	September 9	at Houston Oilers	**W** 35–21	1–1	Astrodome	43,820
3	September 16	St. Louis Cardinals	**L** 33–34	1–2	Hoosier Dome	60,274
4	September 23	at Miami Dolphins	**L** 7–44	1–3	Miami Orange Bowl	55,415
5	September 30	**Buffalo Bills**	**W** 31–17	2–3	Hoosier Dome	60,032
6	October 7	Washington Redskins	**L** 7–35	2–4	Hoosier Dome	60,012
7	October 14	at Philadelphia Eagles	**L** 7–16	2–5	Veterans Stadium	50,277
8	October 21	Pittsburgh Steelers	**W** 17–16	3–5	Hoosier Dome	60,026
9	October 28	at Dallas Cowboys	**L** 3–22	3–6	Texas Stadium	58,724
10	November 4	San Diego Chargers	**L** 10–38	3–7	Hoosier Dome	60,143
11	November 11	at **New York Jets**	**W** 9–5	4–7	Giants Stadium	51,066
12	November 18	**New England Patriots**	**L** 17–50	4–8	Hoosier Dome	60,009
13	November 25	at Los Angeles Raiders	**L** 7–21	4–9	Los Angeles Memorial Coliseum	40,289
14	December 2	at **Buffalo Bills**	**L** 15–21	4–10	Rich Stadium	20,693
15	December 9	**Miami Dolphins**	**L** 17–35	4–11	Hoosier Dome	60,411
16	December 16	at **New England Patriots**	**L** 10–16	4–12	Sullivan Stadium	22,383
Note: Intra-division opponents are in **bold** text.

=== Standings ===
AFC East
	W	L	T	PCT	DIV	CONF	PF	PA	STK
Miami Dolphins^{(1)}	14	2	0	.875	8–0	10–2	513	298	W2
New England Patriots	9	7	0	.563	6–2	9–3	362	352	W1
New York Jets	7	9	0	.438	3–5	7–7	332	364	L1
Indianapolis Colts	4	12	0	.250	2–6	4–8	239	414	L5
Buffalo Bills	2	14	0	.125	1–7	1–11	250	454	L2

== Regular season ==
=== Game summaries ===
==== Week 2: vs. Houston Oilers ====
Week 2: Indianapolis Colts at Houston Oilers

Quarter	1	2	3	4	Total
Colts	0	21	7	7	35
Oilers	7	7	0	7	21

at Astrodome • Houston, Texas

- Date: September 9, 1984
- Game time: 3:00 p.m. EST
- Game attendance: 43,820
- Referee: Fred Wyant
- TV announcers (NBC): Phil Stone (play-by-play) and Reggie Rucker (color commentator)
- Pro-Football-Reference.com

Game information

Colts

Oilers

Scoring summary

Quarter	Time	Drive			Team	Scoring information	Score	
Quarter	Time	Plays	Yards	TOP	Team	Scoring information	IND	HOU
1					Oilers	Campbell 2-yard touchdown run, Kempf kick good	0	7
2					Colts	Pagel 1-yard touchdown run, Biasucci kick good	7	7
2					Oilers	Campbell 15-yard touchdown run, Kempf kick good	7	14
2					Colts	Dickey 15-yard touchdown run, Biasucci kick good	14	14
2					Colts	Butler 31-yard touchdown reception from Pagel, Biasucci kick good	21	14
3					Colts	Butler 14-yard touchdown reception from Pagel, Biasucci kick good	28	14
4					Oilers	Campbell 1-yard touchdown run, Kempf kick good	28	21
4					Colts	Porter 33-yard touchdown reception from Pagel, Biasucci kick good	35	21
"TOP" = time of possession. For other American football terms, see Glossary of American football.							35	21

==== Week 8 vs. Pittsburgh ====
"Good Things come to those who hustle", are words attributed to Pittsburgh's eventual Hall of Fame coach Chuck Noll when he recalled Franco Harris Immaculate Reception in 1972. Those words were never so true when Ray Butler scored in the last minute of play-off a deflected pass to give the Colts a dramatic 17–16 win over the eventual AFC Central Division champion Steelers. The 54-yard score capped a 17-point fourth quarter for the Colts, as they moved on drives of 57, 77 and 80 yards for their third victory of the season.

== See also ==
- History of the Indianapolis Colts
- Indianapolis Colts seasons
- Colts–Patriots rivalry
