= Hal Hunter =

Hal Hunter may refer to:

- Hal Hunter (fullback), American football player
- Hal Hunter (American football, born 1932) (1932–2014), American football coach
- Hal Hunter (American football, born 1959), American football coach

== See also ==
- Harold Hunter (disambiguation)
