= History of the Indianapolis Colts =

American football team chronology

The Indianapolis Colts are a professional American football team based in Indianapolis, Indiana. They play in the South Division of the American Football Conference (AFC) in the National Football League (NFL). The organization began play in 1953 as the Baltimore Colts with the team located in Baltimore, Maryland; it relocated to Indianapolis following the 1983 season.

Carroll Rosenbloom brought an NFL franchise to Baltimore in 1953 and owned the team until 1972 when he traded the franchise to Robert Irsay. The Baltimore Colts won the NFL Championship in 1958, 1959 and 1968, with the Colts losing to the New York Jets in Super Bowl III. The Colts won their first Super Bowl title in 1970 over the Dallas Cowboys. During this time the organization was led by star quarterback Johnny Unitas until 1973 when he was traded to the San Diego Chargers. Following disappointing seasons and poor fan attendance, the franchise moved to Indianapolis in 1984. While in Baltimore the team achieved ten postseason appearances and won four championships.

The Colts organization struggled in the early days in Indianapolis, compiling an 88–135 record from 1984 to 1997. During that time the Colts were led by seven different head coaches and seventeen different starting quarterbacks. The organization made three postseason appearances during the time, with the most success coming in 1995 and 1996 under quarterback Jim Harbaugh. The 1995 team made it to the AFC Championship Game, which they lost to the Pittsburgh Steelers. Robert Irsay remained the principal owner of the Colts until his death in 1997 when the franchise was turned over to his son Jim Irsay.

Following a 3–13 season in 1997, the organization drafted quarterback Peyton Manning, who started for the Colts for thirteen seasons from 1998 until 2010. Under Manning, the Colts saw their greatest success and during his time with the team made 11 postseason appearances, with nine consecutive appearances from 2002 to 2010. The Colts won eight division titles during this time along with two conference championships in 2006 and 2009. The Colts won their second Super Bowl title overall and their first while in Indianapolis during the 2006 season. From 1998 to 2011, the Colts were coached by Jim Mora, Tony Dungy and Jim Caldwell. Following a 2–14 record in 2011 when Manning had been sidelined for the whole season, the Peyton Manning era came to an end in 2012, when the organization released him following multiple neck surgeries. The Colts began to rebuild and drafted quarterback Andrew Luck; Luck retired in 2019.

== NFL Baltimore Colts ==
The Baltimore Colts were the predecessor of the Indianapolis Colts, but they moved after the 1983 season due to a longstanding stadium dispute with the city of Baltimore.

== Relocation to Indianapolis ==
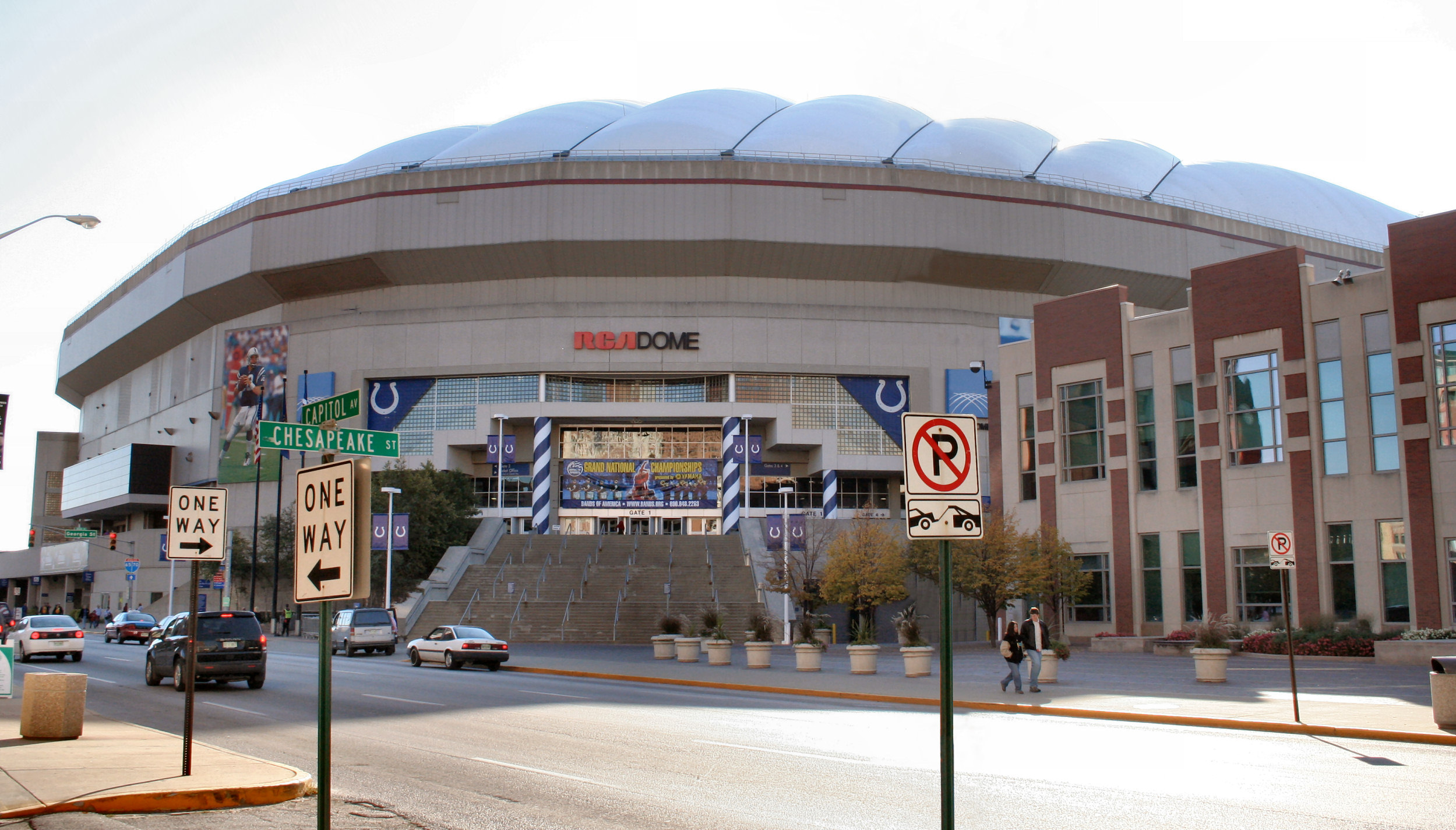
The RCA Dome in Indianapolis was built to attract an NFL team; the Colts would become that team.

In the 1970s, expansion of the NFL from 26 teams to 28, Indianapolis was one of ten cities considered for the two expansion teams. Despite the undoubted advantage of the metropolitan area's location at the junction of more major highways than any other metropolis, Indianapolis would be crossed off when the number of candidates was reduced from ten to four because it was clear the city had no remotely suitable stadium.

In 1979, Indianapolis community leaders created the Indiana Sports Corporation in order to attract major sports events to central Indiana. The next year, Indianapolis Mayor William Hudnut appointed a committee to study the feasibility of building a new stadium that could serve as home to a pro football team and in 1982 construction on the Hoosier Dome (later renamed the RCA Dome) began. On December 18, 1983, the Colts played what would become their final home game in the city of Baltimore. 27,934 fans showed up, 516 more fans than the crowd that had turned out for their first home game in 1947. In February 1984, after relations between Irsay and the city of Baltimore had deteriorated significantly, Baltimore Mayor Schaefer asked the Maryland General Assembly to approve $15 million for renovation to Memorial Stadium. The legislature did not approve the request until the following spring, after the Colts' lease had expired, and only half of that $15 million would go towards improvements that the Colts were seeking (The other half would be for the Baltimore Orioles baseball team). However, Baltimore reportedly did offer Irsay a generous $15 million loan at 6.5%, a guarantee of at least 43,000 tickets sold per game for six years, and the purchase of the team's Owings Mills training facility for $4 million. Despite numerous public reassurances that Irsay's ultimate desire was to remain in Baltimore, he nevertheless continued discussions with several cities hungry for an NFL franchise (New York City, Phoenix, Indianapolis, Birmingham, Jacksonville and Memphis) eventually narrowing the list of cities to two, Phoenix and Indianapolis. A real estate group in Phoenix, Arizona along with Arizona Governor Bruce Babbitt and other top Arizona officials, had secretly met with Irsay early in January. Preliminary talks seemed promising, and another meeting was scheduled. But when word of a second scheduled meeting leaked out and was reported by the Baltimore media on the Friday before the Super Bowl, Irsay canceled. Throughout the 1970s and early 1980s, local Indianapolis real estate developer Robert Welch was spending his own time and funds to lobby the NFL to bring an expansion team to the city, with Welch and other investors as team owner. Indiana Pacers' owner Herb Simon contacted Colts officials in order to take negotiations between the club and Indianapolis to the next level. Mayor Hudnut then assigned deputy mayor David Frick to begin secret negotiations with Colts counsel Michael Chernoff. Colts owner Robert Irsay visited on February 23.

"He (Irsay) was visibly moved", former deputy mayor Dave Frick later said in commenting on Irsay's reaction upon entering the brand new domed stadium. "Emotionally, he was making the move."

Meanwhile, in Baltimore, the situation worsened. Eventually, the Maryland legislature intervened and on March 27, one of its chambers passed legislation giving the city of Baltimore the right to seize ownership of the team by eminent domain, an idea first floated in a memo written by Baltimore Mayoral Aide Mark Wasserman. Robert Irsay said his move was a direct result of the legislation. Colts counsel Michael Chernoff later said of the eminent domain bill: "They not only threw down the gauntlet, but they put a gun to his head and cocked it and asked, 'Want to see if it's loaded?' They forced him to make a decision that day." The city of Indianapolis offered the Colts owner a $12.5 million loan, a $4 million training complex, and the use of the brand new $77.5 million, 57,980 seat Hoosier Dome. After Irsay agreed to the deal, 15 trucks were dispatched to the team's Owings Mills, Maryland training complex at 2:00 am on March 29 because it was feared the franchise would be seized early the following morning. Workers loaded all of the team's belongings and the trucks left for Indianapolis. By 10:00 am, the Colts were completely gone from Baltimore. Each of the Mayflower trucks took a slightly different route on the way to Indianapolis. This was done to confuse the Maryland police, who might have been called on to stop the move. Each van was met at the Indiana state line by Indiana state troopers who escorted them to the Colts' new home in Indianapolis. Later John Moag Jr., chairman of the Maryland Stadium Authority, stated in sworn testimony before the U.S. Senate subcommittee responsible for the Fan Freedom and Community Protection Act: "It was the failure of our local [Baltimore] and state elected officials in Maryland to provide the Colts with a firm proposal for a new stadium that led Mr. Irsay to accept an offer from Indianapolis to play in a new dome in that city."

Baltimore Mayor Schaefer, who had been promised a call by Irsay if the team were to move, appeared on the front page of the Baltimore Sun in tears. After the Colts left, he placed the building of a new stadium at the top of his legislative agenda.

In moving the team, Irsay acted without the NFL's approval, but due to the NFL's court loss to Al Davis in his lawsuit to move the Oakland Raiders to Los Angeles, the NFL was in no mood to try to stop Irsay from moving the Colts. Sportswriter Dave Anderson opined that,

[b]y moving the Colts' franchise in such a murky manner, Robert Irsay almost makes Al Davis look like a silver and black knight.

=== Baltimore moves on ===
Fans in Baltimore were not only heartbroken because of the loss of the team, but because of the loss of the team name. The Colts were named in honor of the city's Preakness Stakes and to acknowledge the hundreds of horse farms throughout the State of Maryland.

In elections that year, city voters voted 62 percent to 38 percent to repeal Question P, a 1974 amendment to the city's charter declaring "the 33rd Street stadium as a memorial to war veterans and prohibiting use of city funds for construction of any other stadium." The team's move triggered a flurry of legal activity. Later, in March 1986, representatives of Baltimore and the Colts organization reached a settlement under which all lawsuits regarding the relocation would be dismissed and the Colts would endorse a new NFL team for Baltimore. Nonetheless, many of the prominent old-time Colts players (many of whom had settled in the Baltimore area) chose to cut all ties to the relocated Colts team. Most notable and vocal among them was Johnny Unitas, who recognized himself solely as a player for the Baltimore Colts until the day he died.

Despite agreeing to do so in the settlement between the City of Baltimore and the Irsay family, the Irsay family refused to endorse Baltimore's bid for an NFL expansion franchise in 1993. This decision helped set in motion the relocation of the Cleveland Browns to Baltimore. On November 6, 1995, Browns owner Art Modell announced his intention to move Cleveland's team to Baltimore. The decision also triggered a flurry of legal activity. Finally, representatives of both cities and the NFL reached a settlement on February 9, 1996. It stipulated that the Browns’ name, colors, and history of the franchise were to remain in Cleveland. It kept the Browns legacy in Cleveland, and Modell took his players and organization to Baltimore, which would be officially regarded as an expansion team. After the Browns relocated to Baltimore, Modell offered the Irsay family $5 million for the rights to the Colts heritage. Jim Irsay replied that it would take at least $50 million to relinquish the Colts name. Therefore, the new Baltimore team was named the Ravens after a fan vote. The Ravens have since won Super Bowls following the 2000 and 2012 seasons.

== 1984–1997: Early struggles ==
=== 1984–1986: First seasons in Indianapolis ===
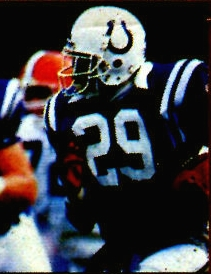
Eric Dickerson led the team in rushing and earned three Pro Bowl invitations during his tenure with the Colts.

The Colts moved to Indianapolis in 1984 and were met with much fanfare, with the team receiving over 143,000 requests for season tickets in just two weeks. Frank Kush remained the head coach of the team and quarterback Mike Pagel started eight games during the season, both members of the Baltimore Colts. However, as in Baltimore, the Colts were unable to find much success and finished the season with a 4–12 record and a fourth-place record in the AFC East. The 1984 team also had the fewest offensive yardage of any NFL team that season. Kush quit the team in December 1984 and was replaced by Hal Hunter who was eventually replaced by Rod Dowhower in 1985. Dowhower fared little better than his predecessor did and the Colts posted a 5–11 record, again for fourth in the AFC East, in 1985. The Colts entered 1986 again with Dowhower as head coach, but started the season with a 0–13 record, with many believing that the Colts would become the first NFL team to finish 0–16 and the first to finish winless since the 1976 Tampa Bay Buccaneers. Dowhower was fired with three games left in the season and was replaced by Ron Meyer. The Colts won their first game of the season against the Atlanta Falcons in week fourteen and finished the season with three straight wins to post a final record of 3–13.

=== 1987 ===
Ron Meyer continued to hold the head coaching position into 1987 but began the season much as they did in 1986, quickly losing their first two games. A players strike in late September caused one game to be cancelled during the season and for the league to revert to using replacement players. Following the strike the Colts were engaged in a large trade with the Los Angeles Rams and Buffalo Bills to acquire future Hall of Fame running back Eric Dickerson, with the Colts giving up six draft picks and two players. After acquiring Dickerson on October 31, the team started to win more consistently with a 6–3 record down the stretch, with a final record of 9–6 and a first-place finish in the AFC East. This division championship was the first for the team in Indianapolis and the first for the Colts organization since 1977. The team made the playoffs for the first time in Indianapolis and faced the Cleveland Browns at Cleveland Stadium, where they lost 38–21 to end an impressive season.

=== 1988–1994: Playoff drought ===
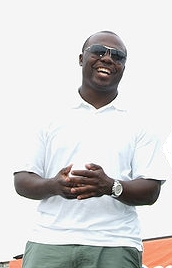
Marshall Faulk was drafted by the Colts in 1994.

The future looked bright for the Colts under Meyer and with Dickerson at running back. Unfortunately, Meyer did not deliver another playoff appearance for the rest of his tenure. In 1988, Dickerson played a full season and again led the league in rushing. However, the Colts began the season with a disappointing 1–5 record. The Colts ended the season with a 9–7 record but were easily beaten by the 12–4 Buffalo Bills for the AFC East division crown. The team continued to slip in 1989 and ended the season with an 8–8 record, good for second in the AFC East. In 1990, the Colts attempted to make another daring move by trading Andre Rison, Chris Hinton, and draft picks for the right to draft Jeff George with the first pick in the 1990 NFL draft. Even with the continued roster improvements and bold trades, the Colts fell to 7–9 in 1990, which put head coach Ron Meyer on the hot seat. The 1991 team faced much pressure in light of missing the previous three postseasons. The team failed to deliver on the expectations and began the season with an 0–9 record and eventually finished the season 1–15, the worst record of any Indianapolis Colts team. Head coach Ron Meyer was replaced after the first five games of the season by defensive coordinator Rick Venturi.

In 1992 Ted Marchibroda was brought in as the new head coach. Marchibroda had been the coach of the Baltimore Colts from 1975 to 1979 and had posted a 41–33 record overall. The Colts received the number one overall pick in the 1992 draft and used it to select defensive tackle Steve Emtman. Indianapolis also dealt start running back Eric Dickerson to the Los Angeles Raiders, thus disposing of many of the components of the 1991 team. With the many changes came different results on the field with the Colts going 9–7 in Marchiroda's first season. Despite the success in 1992, the team only had 1,102 rushing yards, the fewest for any team during the decade. The turnaround seen in 1992 did not continue into 1993 with the team starting the season with a 3–4 record en route to a 4–12 regular-season record, good for fifth in the AFC East. Changes were again implemented in the organization during the 1994 offseason, which saw the Colts trade Jeff George to the Atlanta Falcons and draft running back Marshall Faulk. Faulk went on to be the second great Indianapolis Colts running back following Eric Dickerson.

Along with many of the roster changes seen in the 1994 offseason, owner Robert Irsay also changed team management by replacing his son, Jim Irsay, with Bill Tobin as the general manager of the Colts. Besides the many draft trades and roster moves, Tobin was also instrumental in acquiring quarterback Jim Harbaugh in 1994. These and other changes allowed the Colts to change their fortunes in 1994 with the team improving to an 8–8 record, which was good enough for a third-place finish in the AFC East, but not good enough for a postseason appearance, which the team had not made in seven seasons.

=== 1995–1996: Cardiac Colts ===
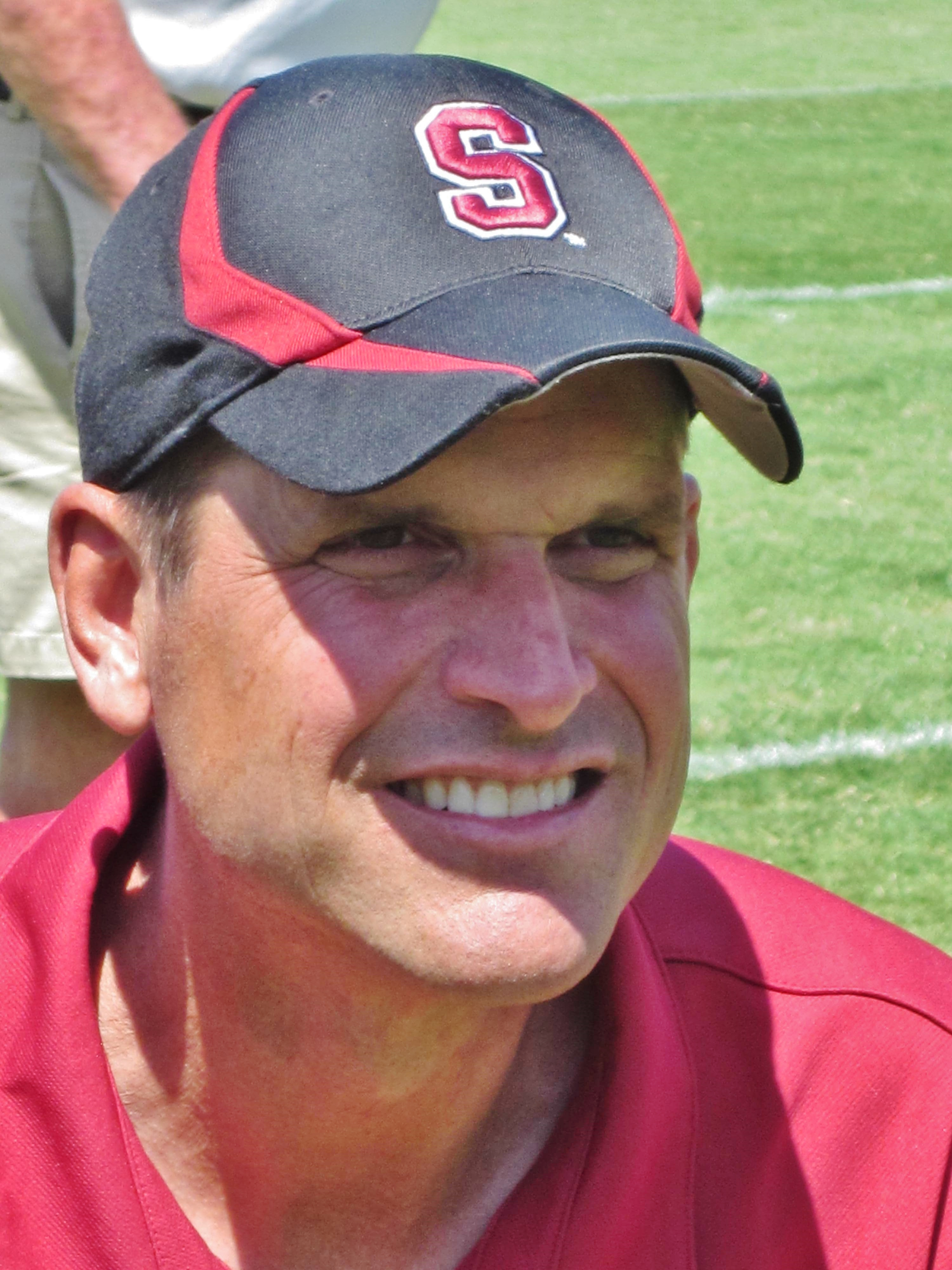
Jim Harbaugh was nicknamed "Captain Comeback" during his time with the Colts.

The continued roster improvement proved to take the Colts organization in the right direction and it was apparent in 1995. The Colts began the season with a 1–2 record, but following the bye week would end the season at 9–7. The 1995 Colts became known as the "Cardiac Colts" due to the close games they played in and the comebacks that they accomplished or almost accomplished. Quarterback Jim Harbaugh was most notable for giving the Colts a lead late in many games, earning him the nickname "Captain Comeback." Indianapolis made the playoffs for the first time in eight seasons and for only the second time in their history in Indianapolis. The Colts faced the San Diego Chargers in the wild-card round, where they defeated San Diego 35–20. The Colts then moved onto the Divisional round, where they defeated the Kansas City Chiefs 10–7 and moved onto the AFC Championship Game for the first time in Indianapolis and for the first time as a franchise since 1971. The Steelers were expected to defeat the Colts easily, but the game turned into a classic matchup. The game seemed to flow in the same fashion as so many other Colts games that year, with the Steelers taking a 13–9 lead into the fourth quarter. However, like other games during the season, Harbaugh put the Colts in position to possibly win the game, as receiver Floyd Turner scored a touchdown to give the Colts a 16–13 lead. The Steelers retook the lead, but left enough time for the Colts to march to the Steelers' 29-yard line with five seconds left. On the last play of the game, Harbaugh heaved a Hail Mary pass to receiver Aaron Bailey that rolled off Bailey's chest and onto the turf to end the game, propelling the Steelers to the victory and ending the Colts season in stunning fashion leaving them one reception away from a Super Bowl XXX appearance.

Ted Marchibroda opted to move back to Baltimore to coach the Baltimore Ravens, prompting the Colts to replace him with Lindy Infante. With their first pick in the 1996 draft, the Colts opted to draft wide receiver Marvin Harrison out of Syracuse. In Harrison's first season with the team, he led the Colts in receiving. Following their 1995 season, they continued to build on their success with a 4–0 start season. However, following the bye week, the Colts went 5–7 and ended the season again with a 9–7 record, which was good enough for third in the AFC East and a second consecutive playoff appearance. The team, however, was not as successful in the postseason as they were in 1995. The Colts lost to the Pittsburgh Steelers, this time by a score of 42–14.

=== 1997 ===
Team owner Robert Irsay, who brought the team to Indianapolis in 1984, died in January after health complications. Robert Irsay's death left complete ownership of the franchise to his son, Jim Irsay. Infante remained the head coach of the team into 1997, where he would lead the team to a disappointing 3–13 record, which placed them at fifth in the AFC East and gave the Colts the number one overall selection in the draft. The season prompted the new owner to begin to rebuild the franchise by building around the number one overall selection in the draft.

== 1998–2011: Peyton Manning era ==
=== 1998 offseason ===
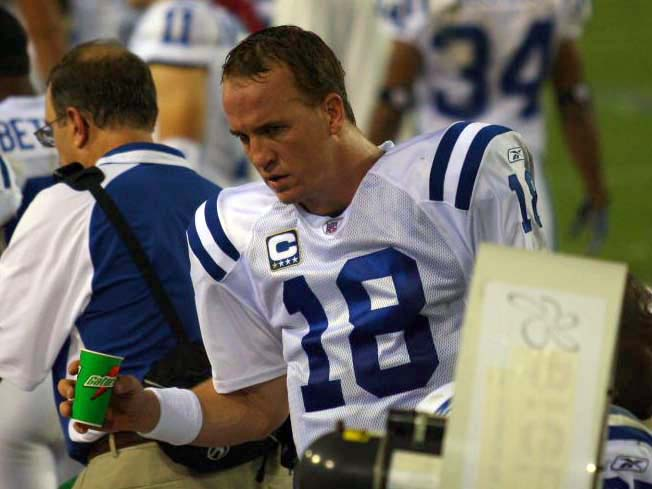
Peyton Manning was the starting quarterback for the Colts from 1998 until 2010.

Following the 1997 season, the Colts began to rebuild under owner Jim Irsay. Irsay began to change the culture of the organization by firing general manager Tobin and hiring Bill Polian to replace him. Polian was the general manager of the Buffalo Bills from 1986 to 1993 and helped guide the team to four consecutive Super Bowl appearances, winning the NFL Executive of the Year Award in 1988 and 1991. Following his time at Buffalo, Polian took the general manager position for the Carolina Panthers, an expansion team that began play in 1995. Polian was in Carolina from 1994 to 1997 and nearly helped guide the Panthers to a Super Bowl in only their second season, when they lost in the NFC Championship Game.

Polian immediately began to change the organization by trading quarterback Jim Harbaugh and firing head coach Lindy Infante and began to build the Colts through the draft. With the Colts having the first pick in the 1998 NFL draft, Polian and team administration worked towards deciding between Peyton Manning from Tennessee or Ryan Leaf from Washington State. Polian chose Manning with the Colts’ pick, with Leaf going to the San Diego Chargers with the second pick. Four years and five teams later, Ryan Leaf was out of football but Manning was on his way to a Hall of Fame career.

=== 1998: Manning’s rookie season ===
Jim Irsay and Bill Polian brought in Jim Mora to replace Lindy Infante as the head coach of the team for the 1998 season. Under Mora and rookie quarterback Peyton Manning, the Colts posted an identical record to the previous season, 3–13, and finished fifth in the AFC East division. Manning set NFL rookie records in all passing categories during the season by throwing for 3,739 yards and 26 touchdown passes during the season and becoming a member of the NFL All-Rookie First Team. Manning, however, also threw a league-high 28 interceptions during the season. Running back Marshall Faulk set a club seasonal mark during the season with 2,227 total yards from scrimmage.

=== 1999–2000: Playoff appearances ===
The Colts received the fourth overall pick in the 1999 NFL draft and used it to select running back Edgerrin James. The Colts also traded away Marshall Faulk to the St. Louis Rams for a second and fifth-round pick in the draft. Following the improvements made to the roster, the Colts began the 1999 season 2–2. After a home loss to the Miami Dolphins on October 10, the Colts went on to win eleven consecutive games and win the AFC East division, the first division championship for the Colts since 1987. The Colts were the second seed in the AFC with a 13–3 record. In the divisional round, the Colts hosted the Tennessee Titans, coming off their "Music City Miracle" victory, but lost 19–16.

In 2000, the Colts posted a 10–6 record, which was good enough for a second-place finish in the AFC East. The Colts made the playoffs as the sixth seed and went to Miami to face the Dolphins in the wild-card round. After leading at halftime, the Colts missed a late field goal and allowed the Dolphins to drive down the field and score the game-winning touchdown in a 23–17 final. Peyton Manning, Edgerrin James and Marvin Harrison all represented the Colts in the Pro Bowl.

=== 2001 ===
The Colts entered the 2001 season with high expectations after two consecutive playoff appearances and drafting Reggie Wayne in the draft. However, the Colts were unable to deliver on these expectations, posting a 6–10 record on the season and missing the postseason with a fourth-place finish in the AFC East. The Colts defense suffered throughout the season, giving up a total of 486 points, for an average of 30 points per game, behind only the 1981 Colts, 1980 Saints and 1966 Giants historically. Despite the lack of defensive support, Peyton Manning put up 4,131 yards throughout the season with Marvin Harrison posting 109 receptions. Following the disappointing season, Polian and the Colts' administration fired head coach Jim Mora.

=== 2002: Tony Dungy arrives ===
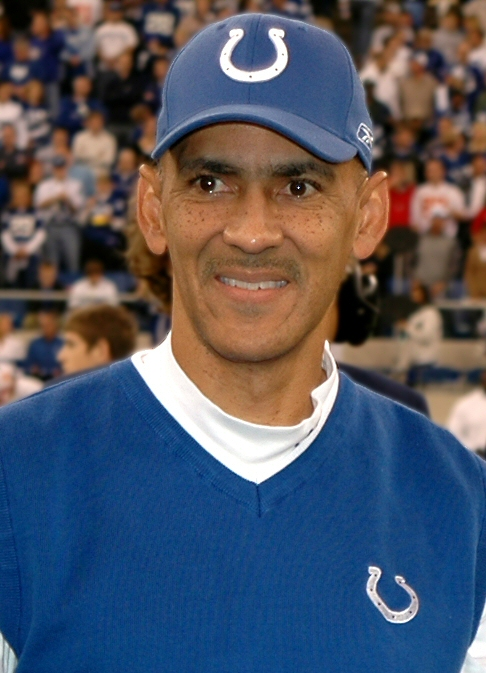
Tony Dungy was head coach of the Colts from 2002 until 2008.

The firing of Mora led to the hiring of head coach Tony Dungy, the former head coach of the Tampa Bay Buccaneers. Colts owner Jim Irsay was so committed to bringing Tony Dungy aboard that he, not Colts general manager Bill Polian, initiated the contact. Late on January 19, 2002, Irsay phoned Dungy at his home in Tampa. "I just wanted him to know from the start that there was no other coach on the planet I wanted to coach my football team", Irsay said. "Not Steve Spurrier. Not Bill Parcells."

Dungy and the team quickly began to change the atmosphere in the organization during the offseason and selected defensive end Dwight Freeney in the first round. Freeney was able to set an NFL rookie record in 2002 with nine forced fumbles, three of which occurred in a single game against former Syracuse football player, Donovan McNabb. Freeney was also the runner-up for the NFL Defensive Rookie of the Year Award. During the season, the Colts posted a 10–6 record and finished second behind the Tennessee Titans in the new AFC South division. The Colts, however, went on to lose in the wild-card round of the playoffs against the New York Jets, 41–0. Manning completed 14 out of 31 passes for 137 yards and two interceptions in the disappointing game.

=== 2003–2004: Division championships ===
Following the Colts' humiliating loss in the 2002 AFC Wild Card playoffs, the team set out with high expectations in 2003. However, the 2003 offseason was not without its controversy, with placekicker Mike Vanderjagt criticizing both quarterback Peyton Manning and Tony Dungy for their lack of emotion and criticizing the team by saying they were not improving. Manning responded to these accusations by calling Vanderjagt an "idiot kicker who got liquored up and ran his mouth off." However, cooler heads prevailed during the season and Vanderjagt kicked the game-winning field goal for the Colts in the season opener against the Cleveland Browns.

The Colts started the 2003 season with a 9–2 record and faced the New England Patriots, who were also 9–2, at the RCA Dome in a pivotal game for home-field advantage in the playoffs. The back and forth game ended with the Colts sitting on the Patriots' one-yard line with first and goal. Manning and the Colts were unable to score on all four downs and lost the game 38–34, dashing their hopes for the number one seed in the AFC. However, the team did finish the season with a 12–4 record and won the AFC South for the first time, the Colts' first division title since 1999. Quarterback Peyton Manning also won his first NFL Most Valuable Player Award, sharing it with Tennessee quarterback Steve McNair. Indianapolis won its first playoff game at home against the Denver Broncos in the AFC Wild Card round and traveled to Kansas City where they defeated the Chiefs to advance to the AFC Championship Game for the first time since 1995. The Colts faced the Patriots in a rematch, this time at Gillette Stadium. The game was played in occasional snow with temperatures around 32 °F (0 °C). The Patriots, as they did in their first meeting, beat the Colts, this time 24–14, to advance to Super Bowl XXXVIII.

The Colts began their 2004 season back at Gillette Stadium to face the defending Super Bowl champion New England Patriots. Colts kicker Mike Vanderjagt missed the game-tying field goal in the final seconds to give the Patriots a 27–24 victory over the Colts. Following the loss to the Patriots, the Colts went on to post a 12–4 record during the season and win the AFC South for the second consecutive season, with the third seed again in the playoffs. During the 2004 season, Peyton Manning had one of the best seasons ever by an NFL quarterback with the Colts setting an NFL record of 49 touchdown passes. The Colts also led the league in points scored with 522. Manning won his second consecutive NFL MVP award and completed 49 touchdown passes for the season, beating Dan Marino’s record of 48. The Colts defeated the Denver Broncos for the second consecutive years in the wild-card round and traveled to Foxborough, Massachusetts to face the Patriots again. Despite the prolific offense and the records broken by the Colts, they could not overcome the Patriots and lost to them in the playoffs 20–3, ending their season again short of a Super Bowl.

=== 2005: Pursuit to perfection ===
The Colts continued to improve their roster and began with attempting to re-sign veteran running back Edgerrin James, which they were not able to do, and franchise–tagged him. The Colts lost tight end Marcus Pollard and defensive end Brad Scioli, but were able to acquire cornerback Marlin Jackson from Michigan in the draft.

The 2005 Colts, led by quarterback Peyton Manning and head coach Tony Dungy, began the season with a 13–0 record, which included a 40–21 victory over the Patriots in Foxborough. Indianapolis lost its first game against the San Diego Chargers in week fifteen to end their perfect season. During the season, Manning and Marvin Harrison broke Steve Young and Jerry Rice’s NFL record for most touchdowns by a quarterback-receiver tandem, reaching 86 in a Monday Night Football home game against the St. Louis Rams in week six. In week sixteen, the Colts played without head coach Tony Dungy following the suicide of his son James earlier in the week. With the team resting most of its key players, the Colts lost their second straight to the eventual NFC Champion Seattle Seahawks. Dungy returned to the sidelines for the last regular-season game as the Colts beat the Arizona Cardinals 17–13 while resting most of the team's usual starters. The team's final record of 14–2 marked the best 16-game season in the franchise's history. The Colts finished the season with a third straight AFC South division championship, the number one overall seed in the playoffs, and home-field advantage.

However, on January 15, 2006, the Colts were eliminated in the divisional round by the eventual Super Bowl champion Pittsburgh Steelers, 21–18. Trailing 21–10 late in the game, the Colts regained possession and put eight points on the board to make it 21–18. After a Jerome Bettis fumble on the goal line, Nick Harper picked up the fumble and almost ran it back, but was tackled at the 40-yard line by Ben Roethlisberger. The Colts then drove down the field, only to have Mike Vanderjagt miss a 46-yard field goal attempt wide right. The game put an end to one of the most successful seasons in Indianapolis history and prevented the team and Manning from reaching the Super Bowl again.

=== 2006: Super Bowl XLI champions ===
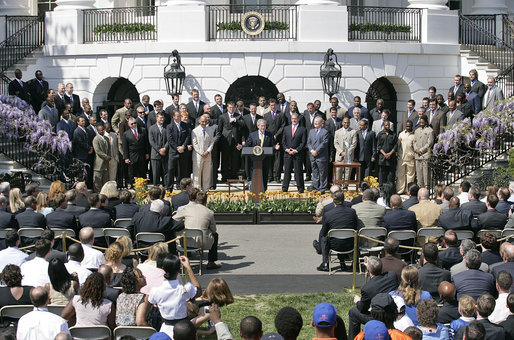
The White House ceremony honoring the 2006 NFL champion Indianapolis Colts.

The Colts again began to improve their roster during the 2006 offseason and did so by drafting running back Joseph Addai from LSU. The Colts lost running back Edgerrin James after the 2005 season when he signed with the Arizona Cardinals, and they acquired former Patriot kicker and free agent Adam Vinatieri to replace Mike Vanderjagt.

The Colts began the season as they had in 2005 with a 9–0 record, becoming the first team in NFL history to begin two consecutive seasons by winning nine games. However, the Colts proceeded to lose three of the next four, largely due to the league's worst run defense. But they were still able to capture their fourth consecutive AFC South championship by defeating the Cincinnati Bengals on Monday Night Football in week fifteen of the season with, ironically, a strong showing from their defense. The Colts finished the season with a 12–4 record, giving them the number three seed in the AFC for the playoffs. The record also marked their fifth consecutive season with ten victories or more. In week thirteen against the Tennessee Titans, Manning and Harrison became the all–time leader in quarterback-wide receiver touchdowns.

The banner hung in commemoration of the 2006 Super Bowl championship team.

The Colts defeated the Kansas City Chiefs 23–8 in the wild card round, despite Peyton Manning throwing three interceptions. The Colts’ defense managed to hold the Chiefs to 44 yards on the ground and two yards passing in the first half. The Chiefs did not earn a first down until 3:33 remained in the third quarter. The Colts continued this playoff momentum when they defeated the Baltimore Ravens 15–6 in the division playoff round at M&T Bank Stadium, thanks to kicker Adam Vinatieri's five field goals and another impressive defensive showing. The win brought the Colts back to the AFC Championship Game for the first time since 2003, where they faced the same team in the New England Patriots. This time the game was played at the RCA Dome and was the third AFC Championship game for the Colts in the Indianapolis era, their first at home, which also marked the first time that the game was played in a domed stadium. After trailing at one point 21–3, the Colts stormed back, defeating the arch-rival Patriots for the third consecutive time, with the final score 38–34 in a classic game. The 18-point comeback was the largest ever in an NFL conference championship game, and tied the record for the fourth largest NFL postseason comeback. The victory allowed the Colts to go to their first Super Bowl in their time in Indianapolis and their first as a franchise since Super Bowl V.

The Colts faced the Chicago Bears in Super Bowl XLI at Dolphin Stadium in Miami Gardens, Florida on February 4, 2007. After overcoming a rocky start that saw the Bears Devin Hester return the opening kickoff 92 yards for a touchdown and the Colts’ Peyton Manning throw an early interception, the Colts won the game 29–17. Rain fell throughout the game, for the first time in Super Bowl history, significantly contributing to the six turnovers committed by both teams in the first half. Peyton Manning was awarded the Super Bowl MVP after completing 25 of 38 passes for 247 yards and a touchdown, caught by Reggie Wayne. Colts' running backs Dominic Rhodes and Joseph Addai combined for 190 rushing yards and a touchdown, while kicker Adam Vinatieri converted 3 of his 4 field goal attempts. Defensively, safety Bob Sanders and cornerback Kelvin Hayden each intercepted Bears' quarterback Rex Grossman late in the game, with Hayden returning his for 56 yards and a touchdown, essentially sealing the Colts’ victory.

Indianapolis became the first "dome team" to win a Super Bowl in an outdoor stadium, the first to win in the rain, and the first to win after having the statistically worst rushing defense in the league during the regular season. Tony Dungy became only the third man to have won the Super Bowl as both a head coach and a player, as well as the first African-American head coach to win a Super Bowl. With their win, the Colts became the only team to date to win a Super Bowl from the AFC South while also becoming the first team to win a professional sports title for the city of Indianapolis since the days that the Indiana Pacers played in the American Basketball Association.

=== 2007–2008: Playoff losses ===
Earlier on February 19, 2007, the Colts placed the franchise tag on Dwight Freeney following the expiration of his rookie contract, which allowed Bill Polian and the Colts front office time to work on a long–term contract. On July 13, 2007, Freeney signed a six-year, $72 million contract with $30 million in guarantees, making Freeney the highest-paid defensive player in the NFL.

The Colts continued their dominance during the regular season in 2007 and began the season with a 7–0 record. In a game dubbed "Super Bowl XLI½," the undefeated Colts and New England Patriots met in the RCA Dome to battle for home-field advantage. The Patriots won the game 24–20 and went on to a 16–0 regular season. The Colts, on the other hand, finished 2007 with a 13–3 record, winning a club-record fifth straight division title and becoming the first NFL team with five consecutive seasons with 12 or more victories and became one of four NFL teams to open three consecutive seasons with 5–0 starts. Indianapolis joined Green Bay (1929–1931), Minnesota (1973–1975) and St. Louis (1999–2001) with three straight 5–0 starts and then becoming the first team in 76 years to start three consecutive seasons with 7–0 starts. Peyton Manning (288) broke the club record for career touchdown passes held by Johnny Unitas (287), while Tony Dungy notched his 74th win to break the franchise record he had shared with Don Shula (73) and Ted Marchibroda (73). Dungy became the only coach in Colts history to post 10 or more wins and earn playoff appearances in six straight seasons. Despite all of the success, the club fell in the divisional round to the San Diego Chargers, 28–24, in the final Colts game at the RCA Dome.

Head coach Tony Dungy announced that he would return for at least one more season, while the Colts also announced that assistant coach Jim Caldwell would assume the position of Colts head coach upon the retirement of Dungy. Also before the 2008 season, Colts quarterback Peyton Manning had his infected bursa sac removed, sidelining him for the entire pre-season.

The Colts opened the 2008 season in their new home, Lucas Oil Stadium, against the Chicago Bears. The Colts were defeated by the Bears and began the season with a 3–4 record. However, following a loss at the Tennessee Titans, the Colts strung together nine consecutive victories, which was good enough for a 12–4 final record and a fifth seed wild card position in the playoffs, extending their league mark to six consecutive seasons with 12 or more victories. Manning also won his third NFL MVP award during the season. The Colts, however, for the second straight year lost in the playoffs to the San Diego Chargers and ended the season in disappointment. Following the 2008 season, head coach Tony Dungy announced his retirement from the team, finishing his career as a Colt with a 92–33 record.

=== Lucas Oil Stadium ===
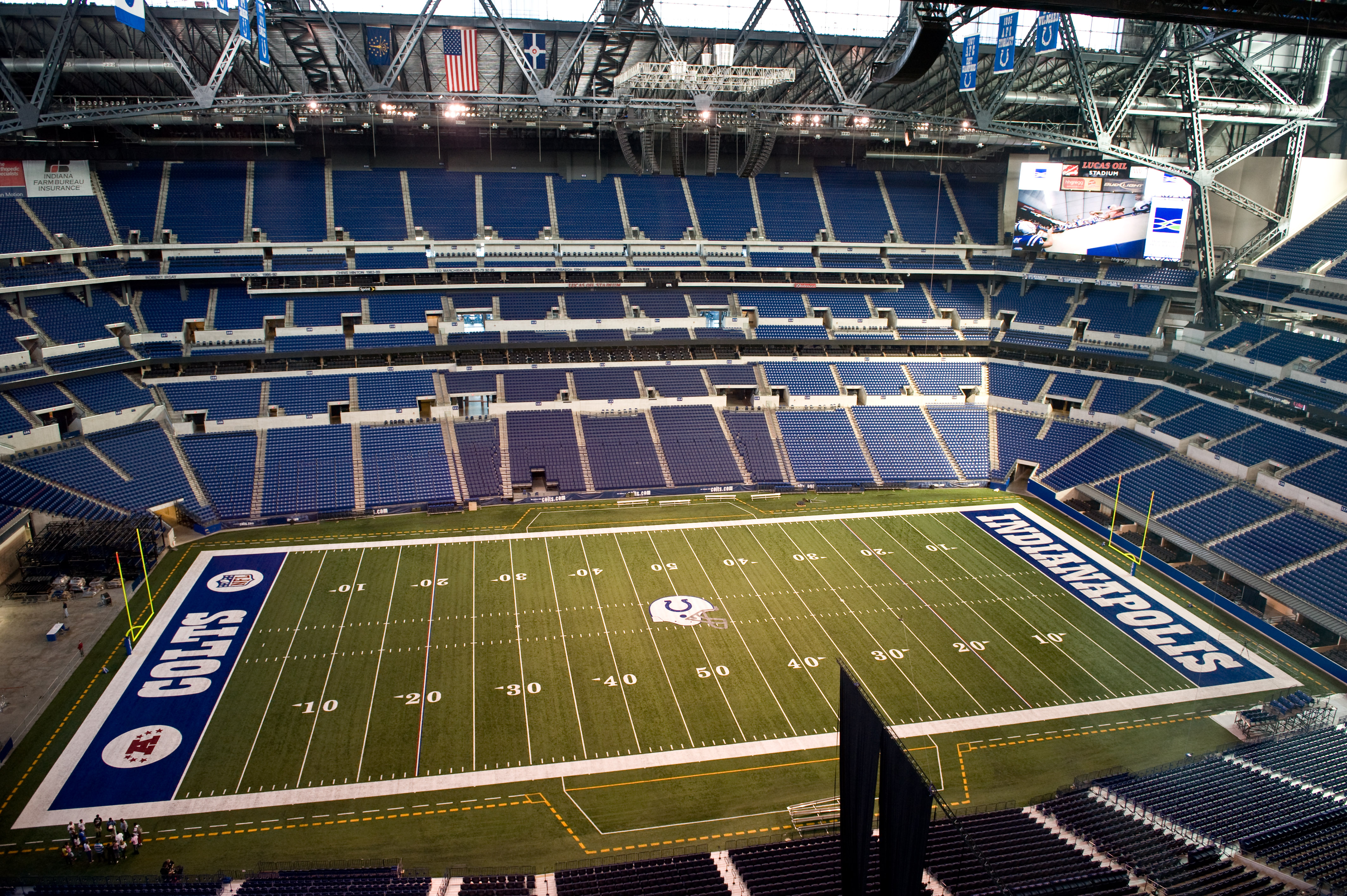
The Colts began playing home games at Lucas Oil Stadium in 2008.

After 24 years of playing at the RCA Dome, the Colts moved to their new home, Lucas Oil Stadium. The Colts began playing in Lucas Oil Stadium in the fall of 2008. In December 2004, the City of Indianapolis and Jim Irsay agreed to a new stadium deal that would benefit both the city and the team at an estimated cost of $675 million. In a deal estimated at $122 million, Lucas Oil won the naming rights to the stadium for 20 years.

It is a seven-level stadium with a retractable roof seating 63,000 for football. It can be reconfigured to seat 70,000 or more for NCAA basketball and football and concerts. It covers 1.8 million square feet (170,000 m^{2}). The stadium features a retractable roof allowing the Colts to play home games outdoors for the first time since arriving in Indianapolis. Using FieldTurf, the playing surface is roughly 25 ft (7.6 m) below ground level. The new stadium is bigger and better than the RCA Dome in many ways, including: 58 permanent concession stands, 90 portable concession stands, 13 escalators, 11 passenger elevators, 800 restrooms, HD scoreboards and replay monitors and 142 luxury suites. Other than being the home of the Colts, the stadium hosts games in both the Men's and Women's NCAA basketball tournaments and serves as the back–up host for all NCAA Final Four Tournaments. It also hosts numerous events and conventions. The stadium hosted the Super Bowl for the 2012 season (Super Bowl XLVI) with a potential economic impact estimated at $286,000,001.

In an ironic twist, a company based near Baltimore, "Controlled Demolition", oversaw the demolition of the RCA Dome. "It's a little ironic that a demolition company from Baltimore had the opportunity to take down the stadium to where the Colts fled when they left Baltimore", said Mark Loizeaux, president of Controlled Demolition and a Baltimore Ravens fan.

=== 2009: Conference champions ===
The Colts offense huddles during a 2009 game against the Jacksonville Jaguars.

The 2009 offseason saw many changes in the Colts organization, most notably being the fact the Jim Caldwell assumed the duties of head coach following Tony Dungy's retirement, with Clyde Christensen being promoted to offensive coordinator. The 2009 season also marked the twelfth season that Peyton Manning was the starting quarterback for the Colts.

Indianapolis began the season with their best mark as a franchise in 2009: the Colts set new records by winning their first 14 games, including a come–from–behind victory over the New England Patriots after a controversial 4th and 2 play. During the season Peyton Manning was sacked only ten times and Indianapolis had the opportunity to repeat New England's 16–0 2007 record. However, during the week sixteen matchup against the New York Jets, Jim Caldwell decided to pull the starting line, allowing their opponent an easy win. Caldwell, along with team president Bill Polian, suffered a barrage of attacks from Colts fans and football experts for letting the team's chance at a perfect season get away. Despite benching their starters, the Colts finished the season with a 14–2 record, matching 2005 for the most wins, and earned the number one seed in the AFC for the playoffs, while Manning also earned his fourth NFL MVP award.

The Colts faced the Baltimore Ravens in the divisional round and easily defeated them 20–3. Meanwhile, the Jets had made a completely unexpected playoff run by defeating the Cincinnati Bengals and San Diego Chargers and thus engaged the Colts in a rematch for the conference title. Running at full strength, Indianapolis handily defeated the Jets in the AFC Championship Game, 30–17, to make their second Super Bowl trip in three years. The Colts met the New Orleans Saints in Miami for Super Bowl XLIV, both teams the number-one seeds from their respective conferences. Despite a 10–0 lead in the first quarter, New Orleans managed to catch up, due in part to an onside kick after halftime. The game was decided in the fourth quarter on a Peyton Manning interception thrown to Saints cornerback Tracy Porter, which was returned for a touchdown. Inconsistent play and mistakes by the team sank their chances at another championship, with the Saints defeating the Colts 31–17.

=== 2010 ===
Following the Colts’ Super Bowl loss, the organization continued to rebuild and bring in quality players to counter the many veterans on the team. The 2010 season began with a stunning upset defeat in Houston, where the Texans beat them 34–24 and poor offensive line performance caused Peyton Manning to take several hits. The next week, the Colts hosted the New York Giants in the second "Manning Bowl", and as in 2006, Peyton easily overpowered his brother's team to win 38–14. However, the remainder of the season was filled with injuries and inconsistent play, with the Colts having, at one point, a 6–6 record, ending their streak of seven consecutive seasons with 12 or more victories. Nonetheless, the team was able to win its final four games, including a week 17 match–up with the Titans, to clinch their second straight AFC South title and 14th division title overall. They also clinched their ninth consecutive postseason appearance, tying the all-time record for consecutive postseason appearances by a team with the Dallas Cowboys, who made the playoffs every season between 1975 and 1983. Indianapolis entered the playoffs as the number three seed and faced the New York Jets again, this time in the wild-card round. A back and forth game ended with controversial play calling from head coach Jim Caldwell and a last-second field goal by the Jets again ended the Colts’ season short of a Super Bowl. Following the game, Peyton Manning became the focus of controversy because of his advancing age, 35 at the time, and surgery for a herniated neck disc.

=== 2011: Manning injury ===
Indianapolis went into the 2011 season with many questions not only about Peyton Manning's health but also his contract status. Manning signed an extension before the beginning of the season, but his availability for the season was in question due to surgery. The league was faced with a lockout from March to July that prevented Manning from using team training facilities to help recover, and when the preseason began he was left on the "Physically Unable to Perform" list. Originally ruled out for the season opener in Houston, Manning was eventually sidelined for the entire season due to multiple surgeries on his neck. Veteran quarterback Kerry Collins (who had retired a month before signing with the Colts) was signed to the team early in the year due to the dissatisfaction with backup quarterbacks Curtis Painter and Dan Orlovsky.

For the first time since 1997, the Colts were not commanded by Peyton Manning and instead were led by Collins in a 34–7 loss against the Houston Texans. The season continued to spiral without Manning and the team was quickly 0–3 and was forced to start Curtis Painter following an injury to Kerry Collins. The Colts continued to look abysmal under Painter with the team going 0–11, including a 62–7 loss to the New Orleans Saints, before Dan Orlovsky was put in to replace Painter against the New England Patriots. Orlovsky led an effort to beat the Patriots, but the Colts fell to them 31–24, to go 0–12 on the season. After much media speculation they would equal the 2008 Lions’ ignominy of losing all sixteen games, the Colts finally won at home against the Tennessee Titans and the Texans in Weeks 15 and 16, so that they finished with a 2–14 record, which was still the second-worst in the Indianapolis era. This record ensured the Colts the number one overall pick in the 2012 NFL draft and began to stir up controversy over Peyton Manning’s continued presence within the organization.

The Peyton Manning era came to an end on March 8, 2012, when Jim Irsay announced that Manning was officially being released from the roster after 13 seasons. Although Manning’s medical condition and throwing strength continued to improve, Irsay stated that the Colts were embarking on "an ambitious rebuilding project" and that due to Manning's age, 36, it was unlikely that he could win another Super Bowl before the rebuilding project was finished. In addition, the Colts would have owed him an additional $20 million if he'd stayed on the roster another week.

== 2012–2018: Rebuilding and the Andrew Luck era ==
=== 2012 offseason ===
Jim Irsay began rebuilding the Colts following the 2011 season and following the release of Peyton Manning, who later signed with the Denver Broncos. Irsay fired team president Bill Polian and his son Chris Polian, ending Bill Polian's 14-year stint with the organization. Head coach Jim Caldwell was also fired after three seasons. Irsay then hired Ryan Grigson, the director of player personnel for the Philadelphia Eagles, as the new general manager and hired Chuck Pagano, the defensive coordinator of the Baltimore Ravens, as the new head coach. The Colts also began to cut former veteran players from the Manning era, including Joseph Addai, Dallas Clark and Gary Brackett. The change in team structure all culminated with the selection of Stanford quarterback Andrew Luck with the number one overall pick in the draft as well as tight end Coby Fleener, also from Stanford, who was selected in the second round.

=== 2012–2014: Return to the playoffs ===
==== 2012 ====
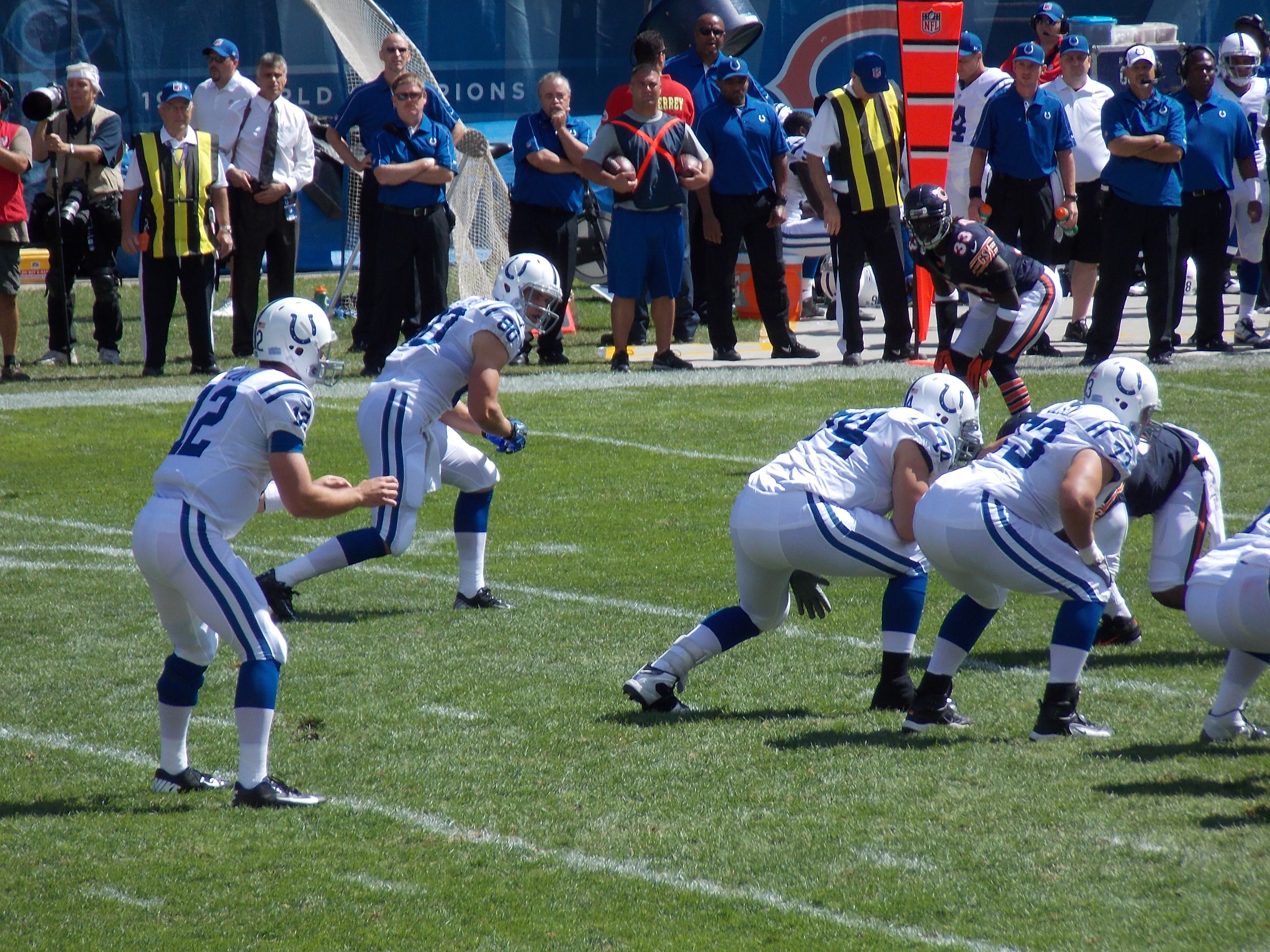
Andrew Luck in his rookie debut against the Chicago Bears.

The Colts entered the 2012 season with an entirely new coaching staff, along with a variety of new players and rookies. As a result of the disastrous 2011 season, many had low expectations for the team, reasoning that it would be a rebuilding year. In his rookie debut against the Chicago Bears, Andrew Luck threw for 309 yards and completed 23 of 45 passes, however, the Colts lost the game 41–21. The Colts went 1–2 in their first three games of the season, winning their first game of the season in week two against the Minnesota Vikings. During the bye week, the Colts announced that first-year head coach Chuck Pagano had been diagnosed with leukemia and would miss a significant chunk of the season. Offensive coordinator Bruce Arians, who was brought in during the offseason, served as the interim head coach until Pagano returned. In their first game without their head coach, the Colts faced the Green Bay Packers, who had compiled a 15–1 record the previous season. The Colts went on to stun the Packers and win the game 30–27, rallying from a 21–3 deficit in the first half.

Following the Green Bay win, Indianapolis went 5–1 in their next six games, with their only loss coming against the New York Jets. Visiting New England in week 11, the Colts had compiled a 6–3 record, with a playoff berth possible. The Colts lost to the Patriots for the third time in the past three seasons, but went on to win five of their next six games, giving them an 11–5 record on the season and guaranteeing them a berth in the postseason. Chuck Pagano returned to the sidelines in week 17 in a game against the Texans, which the Colts won 28–16. Luck set the rookie record for passing yards in week sixteen against the Kansas City Chiefs, throwing for 4,374 yards on the season. The Colts faced the Baltimore Ravens in their return to the playoffs; however, an inability to score in the red zone led to the Colts not scoring a single touchdown and eventually losing the game 24–9.

==== 2013 ====
The team's newfound success with Luck at the helm continued into 2013. In the season's third week, Luck returned to Northern California to face the San Francisco 49ers, led by his former Stanford head coach Jim Harbaugh. Supplementing a strong performance by the defense, Luck threw for 159 yards and rushed for 24, including a 6-yard touchdown scamper late in the fourth quarter that put the Colts up 20–7. Indy eventually won 27–7 in a game that saw newly acquired running back Trent Richardson score a touchdown on his first carry as a Colt.

Week 6 saw Peyton Manning’s return to Lucas Oil Stadium as the Colts hosted the 5–0 Denver Broncos. Emotions ran high at the game, where the Colts played a tribute video thanking Manning for his contributions to the team. The Colts raced out to a 26–14 halftime lead and went up 36–17 early in the fourth quarter. Although Manning and the Broncos stormed back with two late touchdowns, the Colts held on to beat their former hero 39–33. Although both quarterbacks played well, Luck registered a higher quarterback rating than his predecessor, completing 21 of 38 passes for 228 yards and 3 touchdowns. Luck added a rushing touchdown to open the scoring in the third quarter.

After their emotional defeat of the Broncos, the Colts beat Houston to claim a 6–2 record at the season's halfway point. Although the Colts again won the AFC South with an 11–5 record, the last half of the season saw some unexpected collapses, including a 38–8 loss to the St. Louis Rams and a 40–11 dismantling by the Arizona Cardinals, who were led by former Colts offensive coordinator and interim head coach Bruce Arians.

Entering the playoffs for the second straight year, the Colts hosted the Kansas City Chiefs in the wild-card round. The Colts had defeated the Chiefs 23-7 just two weeks earlier, but fell behind 38-10 early in the third quarter thanks to turnovers and an anemic offense. Midway through the third quarter, the defense stiffened and the offense came alive. The Colts stormed back with three third-quarter touchdowns and cut the Chiefs' lead to 41–38 early in the fourth period when Andrew Luck scooped up a Donald Brown fumble and lunged into the end zone from five yards out. On the ensuing drive, Kansas City took five minutes off the clock and extended their lead to six points on Ryan Succop's 43-yard field goal. After getting the ball back, the Colts took their first lead of the game when wide receiver T. Y. Hilton beat two Chiefs defenders and took it to the house on a 64-yard bomb from Andrew Luck. Leading 45–44, the Colts stopped Kansas City on fourth down and knelt three times to win the game. The victory went down as the second-largest playoff comeback in NFL history. Luck threw for 443 yards, four touchdowns, and three interceptions. Hilton finished the game with 224 yards and two touchdowns on 13 receptions.

The next week, the Colts traveled to face their old nemesis New England in the Divisional round. Luck threw four interceptions and the Colts allowed six rushing touchdowns — the second-most in NFL playoff history — in a season-ending 43–22 loss.

==== 2014 ====
Indianapolis opened the 2014 season 0–2 with losses to the Denver Broncos and the Philadelphia Eagles before storming back to enter their bye week at 6–3. The Colts again finished the season 11–5 and entered the playoffs as AFC South champions for the third straight year. The Colts also became the first team of the Super Bowl era to compile 300 or more passing yards in eight consecutive games.

In the wild-card round, the Colts played host to the Cincinnati Bengals. After a close first half, the Colts broke the game open in the second half by scoring 13 unanswered points. On Luck's only touchdown pass of the game, the third-year quarterback stepped up to avoid pressure and threw a 36-yard touchdown pass to receiver Donte Moncrief just as he was wrapped up around the ankles by a Bengals defender. The Colts defense also turned in an impressive performance, holding the Bengals to 254 total yards and sacking quarterback Andy Dalton three times en route to a 26–10 win. The game marked the Bengals' fifth Wild Card round loss in their last six seasons.

The Colts moved on to face former quarterback Peyton Manning and the Denver Broncos, who had defeated them 31–24 in Week 1 of the regular season. The Colts offensive line didn't allow a sack, letting Andrew Luck throw for 265 yards and two touchdowns. Although the Colts' performance was far from perfect, they capitalized on the Broncos’ mistakes. Manning struggled, completing 26 of 46 passes for 211 yards and consistently overthrowing receivers on deep routes. The Broncos could only convert 25 percent of their third-down attempts. The game played out much like the Colts' defeat of the Bengals a week earlier: taking a small lead at halftime before extending that lead in the second half. The Colts defeated the Broncos 24–13, marking Peyton Manning's ninth one-and-done loss in the playoffs, seven of which came when he helmed the Colts. It also marked Andrew Luck's third postseason victory, a milestone Manning didn't reach until his seventh year in the NFL.

Indianapolis moved on to once again face the New England Patriots in the AFC Championship game. In their first conference title game since the 2009 season, the Colts came out flat, trailing 17–7 at halftime before being eliminated 45–7 in the second-most lopsided AFC Championship game in NFL history. Andrew Luck played poorly in a rain-soaked affair, completing only 36 percent of his passes for 126 yards and two interceptions. Patriots quarterback Tom Brady threw three touchdown passes, and running back LeGarrette Blount embarrassed the Colts defense in the playoffs for the second straight year by rushing for 148 yards and three scores. The Patriots went on to defeat the Seattle Seahawks in Super Bowl XLIX. The defeat marked the Colts' sixth straight loss to the Patriots — not having won since the 2009 "4th and 2" game — and Andrew Luck's fourth failure in as many tries to defeat New England. Since Andrew Luck took over as quarterback in 2012, the Colts had suffered losses of 35, 21, 22, and 38 points to the Patriots in what was previously a back-and-forth rivalry.

Shortly after the Colts’ elimination, controversy arose over the Patriots’ possible underinflation of team footballs during the AFC Championship. This controversy eventually grew into the Deflategate scandal, prompting some in the sports world to call for New England's disqualification from Super Bowl XLIX.

=== 2015–2017: Luck injuries and quarterback struggles ===
==== 2015 ====
The Colts entered the 2015 season having gone 11–5 and won the AFC South in each of the previous three seasons. However, the Colts had a middling start to the year, and were 3–5 by the season's halfway point. The Colts’ three wins during the first half of the season had all come against divisional opponents, and two of them were engineered by 40-year-old backup quarterback Matt Hasselbeck, who replaced Andrew Luck during a shoulder injury. After a series of close losses, including a 26–29 overtime loss to the Carolina Panthers, the Colts fired offensive coordinator Pep Hamilton and elevated Rob Chudzinski to replace him. The move seemed to have paid off the next week, as the Colts defeated the Denver Broncos 27–24 in what would prove Peyton Manning's last game against his former team. However, it was revealed after the game that Luck had suffered a lacerated kidney on a hard hit by Broncos Linebacker Danny Trevathan, sidelining him for the rest of the season.

Hasselbeck returned to lead the Colts to two straight wins over Atlanta and Tampa Bay before a 45–10 loss to the Pittsburgh Steelers. Hasselbeck left the game due to neck and shoulder pain and was replaced by Charlie Whitehurst. Hasselbeck started the next three games — losses to divisional rivals Jacksonville and Houston and a win over Miami — but the battered veteran was replaced by Whitehurst in each contest. The Colts' quarterback situation had grown so dire by the season's last week that they signed quarterbacks Josh Freeman and Ryan Lindley the Tuesday before their final game. The two quarterbacks, who hadn't played NFL football all season, combined to lead the Colts to a 30–24 victory over the Tennessee Titans. Although the win put the Colts at 8–8, they were officially eliminated from playoff contention that week when the Houston Texans defeated Jacksonville to reach a 9–7 mark and win the AFC South. 2015 marked the first time the Colts had missed the playoffs since 2011 and only the third time in the past 17 seasons.

Although there was speculation that 2015 might be head coach Chuck Pagano’s last season, he was eventually given a contract extension along with general manager Ryan Grigson.

==== 2016 ====
The Colts’ 2016 season was a great start for Andrew Luck, but not for the Colts' defense. The Colts started their season with seven key defensive backs injured, including Vontae Davis, Clayton Geathers, and Darius Butler. Out of desperation, the Colts signed Antonio Cromartie for replacement of Davis. The defense allowed 340 passing yards, 63 rushing yards, 2 rushing touchdowns and 3 passing touchdowns. Matthew Stafford took advantage of one last chance Sunday and Matt Prater redeemed himself with a 43-yard field goal with 8 seconds to give the Detroit Lions a 39–35 victory at Indianapolis. Detroit won for only the second time in Indianapolis, countering an Andrew Luck-led drive that had seemingly rallied the Colts to an improbable last-minute victory. The Colts lost the next game to start at 0–2 for the second year in a row. The team finished at 8–8 once again, with only one winning streak longer than two games and missing the playoffs despite a weak division. They also got swept by the Houston Texans for the first time in franchise history.

==== 2017: No Luck ====
Andrew Luck was revealed to have suffered a lingering shoulder injury back in 2015, opting for surgery in the offseason. However, Luck was not ready to play by the season start, getting held out of offseason training activities and was eventually deactivated for the season as he required further surgery. This forced the Colts to trade receiver Phillip Dorsett to the New England Patriots for their third-string quarterback Jacoby Brissett. After an ineffective performance by opening day starter Scott Tolzien, Brissett became the starting quarterback for the remainder of the season. The Colts struggled in 2017, finishing the season 4–12 which lead to the firing of head coach Chuck Pagano following the season's conclusion.

==== 2018 ====
The Colts attempted to hire Patriots offensive coordinator Josh McDaniels to replace Pagano as head coach, even making an announcement about the purported hiring. However, McDaniels backed out after giving a verbal agreement, returning to the Patriots amidst major backlash. The Colts then managed to hire Frank Reich as head coach. Reich had previously served as the offensive coordinator for the Super Bowl champion Philadelphia Eagles, following a past tenure as Indianapolis' wide receivers coach. He was most famously Jim Kelly's backup quarterback on dominant Buffalo Bills teams from the 1990s.

Andrew Luck was cleared from his shoulder surgery and returned to action in 2018. Despite another weak start, the Colts won nine of their remaining ten games to clinch a Wild-Card playoff berth at 10–6, becoming only the third team in NFL history to make the playoffs after starting at 1–5. They defeated the rival Houston Texans in the Wild-Card round, but were blown out by the Kansas City Chiefs 13–31 in the Divisional round.

== 2019–2022: Post Andrew Luck era ==
=== 2019 ===
During the second half of a preseason game against the Chicago Bears on August 24, 2019, Andrew Luck announced that he had retired from the NFL. During the post-game press conference, Luck stated that he had not been planning to announce his retirement until the afternoon of August 25, but changed his mind when news broke during the game. Regarding his retirement, Luck said, "I've been stuck in this process. I haven't been able to live the life I want to live. It's taken the joy out of this game. The only way forward for me is to remove myself from football. This is not an easy decision. It's the hardest decision of my life. But it is the right decision for me."

Following Luck's retirement, backup quarterback Jacoby Brissett again became the starting quarterback for the Colts.

During the off-season between the 2019 and 2020 seasons, the Colts signed Philip Rivers as their starting quarterback.

=== 2020 ===
With Rivers, and the number-one ranked defense, the Colts went 11-5 and returned to the playoffs, but were sent home early after losing 27–24 to the Buffalo Bills. After 17 seasons, Rivers retired. Following the season offensive coordinator Nick Sirianni accepted the Head Coaching job for the Philadelphia Eagles.

=== 2021 ===
The Colts acquired QB Carson Wentz via trade in the following off-season. Second year players like runningback Jonathon Taylor and wide receiver Michael Pittman Jr. led the way on offense, while the defense remained top 10 in points allowed. The Colts were 9-7 going into the season finale against the Jacksonville Jaguars, where with a win they would make the playoffs, they lost causing them to miss the playoffs at 9–8. Following the loss many fans called for the firing of Head Coach Frank Reich, and for the release or trading of quarterback Carson Wentz. Following the season defensive coordinator Matt Eberflus accepted the Head Coaching job for the Chicago Bears.

=== 2022 ===
New defensive coordinator Gus Bradley and the defense led the way in 2022, while the offense struggled mightily. Recently acquired quarterback Matt Ryan struggled and eventually was replaced by Sam Ehlinger midseason. After a 3-5-1 start the Colts fired head coach Frank Reich, and shocked everyone when they announced Jeff Saturday, a retired center and then ESPN analyst, would be named interim head coach. Under Saturday the Colts went 1–7, including a loss to the Minnesota Vikings after leading the game 33–0 at half, setting a new record for the largest blown lead in NFL history. The Colts finished the year 4-12-1 earning them the 4th selection in the 2023 NFL draft.

== 2023–present: Shane Steichen era ==
=== 2023 ===
On February 14, 2023, Eagles offensive coordinator Shane Steichen was hired by the Indianapolis Colts as their head coach. In free agency, the Colts signed quarterback Gardner Minshew. They also signed kicker Matt Gay to the largest deal for a placekicker in NFL history.

On August 15, 2023, Colts head coach Shane Steichen named Richardson as the Colts starting quarterback over Gardner Minshew and Sam Ehlinger. Richardson became the first rookie quarterback in NFL history to rush for a touchdown in each of his first three games. On October 18, 2023, the Colts announced that Richardson would miss the remainder of the season with a Grade 3 AC joint sprain suffered against the Tennessee Titans. On October 24, 2023, he successfully underwent shoulder surgery to repair the sprain. Steichen subsequently named Minshew as the starter during Richardson's absence.

The Colts' Season in 2023 was marked by key injuries to the team, including to Richardson and All-Pro running back Jonathan Taylor. However, the Colts improved upon their 4–12–1 record in 2022, finishing 9–8 in 2023 and narrowly missing the playoffs with a loss to the Houston Texans in the season finale.

=== 2024 ===
With the 15th pick in the 2024 NFL draft, the Colts selected defensive end Laiatu Latu.

=== 2025 ===
On May 21, 2025, Colts owner and CEO Jim Irsay died at the age of 65. His three children, daughters Carlie Irsay-Gordon, Casey Foyt, and Kalen Jackson, each hold leadership roles and some ownership of the team.
