= Newton Williams =

Newton Williams may refer to:

- Newton Williams (American football)
- Newton Williams (footballer)
