= Henry Hunter =

Henry Hunter may refer to:

- Henry Hunter (RAF officer) (1893–1966)
- Henry Hunter (actor), American actor
- Henry Hunter (Home and Away), a fictional character in the Australian soap opera Home and Away
- Henry Hunter (divine) (1741–1802), minister who translated Leonard Euler and Johann Kaspar Lavater
- Henry Hunter (Mississippi politician) (d. 1822), territorial legislator
- Henry Hunter (architect) (1832–1892), Tasmanian architect
- Henry Hunter (Marvel Cinematic Universe)
- Henry Hunter Hall
- Henry Hunter Bryan

== See also ==
- Hunter Henry
- Harry Hunter (disambiguation)
