= Harold Hunter (disambiguation) =

Harold Hunter (1974–2006) was an American skateboarder and actor.

Harold Hunter may also refer to:

- Harold Hunter (basketball) (1926–2013), American basketball coach and player
- Buddy Hunter (Harold James Hunter, born 1947), American baseball player
- Harold D. Hunter, American Pentecostal scholar

== See also ==
- Hal Hunter (disambiguation)
- Harry Hunter (disambiguation)
