= Sid Abramowitz =

American football player (born 1960)

No. 74, 69
- Position: Tackle

Personal information
- Born: May 21, 1960 (age 66); Culver City, California, U.S.
- Listed height: 6 ft 6 in (1.98 m)
- Listed weight: 280 lb (127 kg)

Career information
- High school: Leavenworth (Leavenworth, Kansas)
- College: Air Force; Tulsa
- NFL draft: 1983: 5th round, 113th overall pick

Career history
- Baltimore Colts (1983); Seattle Seahawks (1984); New York Jets (1985); St. Louis Cardinals (1986)*; Indianapolis Colts (1987)
- * Offseason or practice squad member only

Awards and highlights
- Third-Team All-America (1982); 2x First-Team All-Missouri Valley Conference (1981-1982)

Career NFL statistics
- Games played: 22
- Games started: 4
- Stats at Pro Football Reference

Sidney H. Abramowitz (born May 21, 1960) is an American former professional football player who played offensive tackle for four seasons in the National Football League (NFL). He was selected by the Baltimore Colts in the fifth round of the 1983 NFL draft. Abramowitz played college football at Air Force and Tulsa.

== Early life ==
Sid Abramowitz was born on May 21, 1960, in Culver City, California. Abramowitz's father was an officer in the United States Army and the family moved to Leavenworth, Kansas when his father was transferred to Fort Riley. Abramowitz attended Leavenworth High School where he was a three-sport letterman in football, wrestling, and track and field.

== College career ==
Abramowitz began his college career at the U.S. Air Force Academy, but left after his first semester. He continued his college career at Tulsa, where he was forced to sit out for one year due to transfer rules.

At Tulsa, Abramowitz was a two-year starter at offensive tackle from 1981 to 1982. As a junior, he received All-Missouri Valley Conference First-Team honors and an All-America Team honorable mention. In 1981, Tulsa were co-champions of the Missouri Valley Conference with Drake. As a senior in 1982, Abramowitz was again named to the All-Missouri Valley Conference First-Team and to the 1982 All-America Third-team. Tulsa went 10-1 that season and won the Missouri Valley Conference.

Following his senior year, Abramowitz played in the 1982 Blue–Gray Football Classic, the East-West Shrine Game, and the Senior Bowl.

Abramowitz was inducted into the University of Tulsa Athletics Hall of Fame in 2006.

== Professional career ==
At the 1983 NFL draft, Abramowitz was drafted by the Baltimore Colts in the fifth round with the 113th overall selection. He was also drafted by the Arizona Wranglers of the United States Football League in the third round with the 26th overall selection of the 1983 USFL draft. Abramowitz chose to play in the NFL with Baltimore.

In his rookie season with the Colts, Abramowitz appeared in 14 games and started the season finale against the Houston Oilers. During the 1984 offseason, the Colts moved to Indianapolis. Abramowitz initially made the move with the team, but was cut on August 20, 1984.

Abramowitz then spent the 1984 season with the Seattle Seahawks, appearing in four games with one start. His lone start that season came in a Wildcard round playoff game against the defending-Super Bowl champion Los Angeles Raiders. He started as a last minute replacement for Ron Essink, who missed the game due to illness. The Seahawks beat the Raiders, but lost the following week in the Divisional Round to the Miami Dolphins. Abramowitz was released by the Seahawks in August 1985.

Abramowitz was signed by the New York Jets two days later. He appeared in one game for the Jets during the 1985 season before he was released on September 12, 1985.

In the 1986 offseason, Abramowitz was picked up by the St. Louis Cardinals. He was released in August 1986, and did not make the Cardinals' opening game roster.

After one year out of the league, Abramowitz was brought back by the Indianapolis Colts during the 1987 player's strike as a replacement player. Abramowitz played in the three "strike team" games that season and was released at the conclusion of the strike. Abramowitz was living in Indianapolis at the time, and was given a leave of absence from his sales job with Crescent Paper Company to play for the Colts.

== Personal life ==
Abramowitz was a member of the United States Army Reserve. While playing for the Baltimore Colts, Abramowitz was stationed at Fort Benjamin Harrison in Indianapolis when the team moved there in 1984. Following his retirement from the NFL, Abramowitz moved to Tulsa, Oklahoma before settling in Atlanta. He is Jewish.
