= Vaughn Williams =

American football player (born 1961)

No. 40
- Position: Safety

Personal information
- Born: December 14, 1961 (age 64); Denver, Colorado, U.S.
- Listed height: 6 ft 2 in (1.88 m)
- Listed weight: 193 lb (88 kg)

Career information
- High school: George Washington (Denver)
- College: Stanford
- NFL draft: 1984: undrafted

Career history
- San Francisco 49ers (1984); Indianapolis Colts (1984); San Francisco 49ers (1986)*
- * Offseason or practice squad member only
- Stats at Pro Football Reference

Vaughn Aaron Williams (born December 14, 1961) is an American former professional football safety who played in the National Football League (NFL) with the San Francisco 49ers and Indianapolis Colts. He played college football for the Stanford Cardinal.

== Early life ==
Vaughn Aaron Williams was born on December 14, 1961, in Denver, Colorado. He attended George Washington High School in Denver.

== College career ==
Williams enrolled at Stanford University to play college football for the Cardinal. He was also recruited by Nebraska, Notre Dame, UCLA, and Michigan but chose Stanford for its academics. He was a four-year letterman from 1980 to 1983. Williams recorded seven career interceptions for 88 yards and one touchdown.

== Professional career ==
After going undrafted in the 1984 NFL draft, Williams signed with the San Francisco 49ers on May 10. Scouts reportedly said Williams went undrafted due to being slow. He had a 4.8 to 4.9 second 40-yard dash. He was placed on injured reserve on August 27 and released on September 28.

Williams was signed by the Indianapolis Colts on October 10, 1984. He played in ten games, starting one, for the Colts at strong safety during the 1984 season. On October 14, 1984, against the Indianapolis Colts, he was targeted by quarterback Mike Pagel on offense but did not catch the pass. Williams was released on August 27, 1985, after the third game of the 1985 preseason.

Williams signed with the 49ers again on February 19, 1986. He was released before the start of the regular season.

== Coaching career ==
Williams was Stanford's defensive backs coach in 1994.
