= Harry Hunter (disambiguation) =

Harry Hunter was an Australian footballer.

Harry Hunter may also refer to:

- Harry Hunter (sailor) (1925–1988), British Olympic sailor
- Harry Hunter (1840–1906), English music hall performer and co-founder of Francis, Day & Hunter Ltd.
- Harry Hunter, a character in How to Save a Marriage and Ruin Your Life
- Harry Hunter, namesake of Hunter's Hot Springs in Oregon

== See also ==
- Henry Hunter (disambiguation)
- Harold Hunter (disambiguation)
