= Kevin Call =

American football player (born 1961)

No. 72, 71
- Position: Offensive tackle

Personal information
- Born: November 13, 1961 (age 64); Boulder, Colorado, U.S.
- Listed height: 6 ft 7 in (2.01 m)
- Listed weight: 302 lb (137 kg)

Career information
- High school: Fairview (CO)
- College: Colorado State
- NFL draft: 1984: 5th round, 130th overall pick

Career history
- Indianapolis Colts (1984–1993)

Awards and highlights
- First-team All-WAC (1983)

Career NFL statistics
- Games played: 130
- Games started: 87
- Fumble recoveries: 2
- Stats at Pro Football Reference

Kevin Bradley Call (born November 13, 1961) is an American former professional football player who was a tackle who for 10 seasons with the Indianapolis Colts of the National Football League (NFL). He played college football for the Colorado State Rams.

Call was a starter on the offensive line for all four of his seasons at Colorado State University. He was inducted into the Colorado State University Athletics Hall of Fame in 1999.
