= Gary Padjen =

American football player (born 1958)

No. 60, 90
- Position: Linebacker

Personal information
- Born: July 2, 1958 (age 68); Salt Lake, Utah, U.S.
- Listed height: 6 ft 2 in (1.88 m)
- Listed weight: 244 lb (111 kg)

Career information
- High school: Kearns (UT)
- College: Arizona State
- NFL draft: 1980: 11th round, 300th overall pick

Career history
- Dallas Cowboys (1980)*; Washington Redskins (1981)*; Baltimore Colts (1982–1983); Indianapolis Colts (1984,1987); Atlanta Falcons (1988)*
- * Offseason or practice squad member only

Career NFL statistics
- Fumble recoveries: 1
- Stats at Pro Football Reference

Gary Anthony Padjen (born July 2, 1958) is an American former professional football player who was a linebacker in the National Football League (NFL) for the Baltimore Colts and Indianapolis Colts. He played college football for the Arizona State Sun Devils.

== Early life ==
Padjen attended Kearns High School. In football, he was a member of two unbeaten teams. As a senior, he was one of the team's captains and received All-State honors at defensive tackle. In track, he won the state's shot put championship. He also competed in wrestling, where he was the state's runner-up.

He accepted a football scholarship from Arizona State University. As a freshman, he was a backup at middle guard. As a sophomore, he was converted into a linebacker and was named the starter at middle linebacker.

As a junior, he ranked sixth on the team in tackles. As a senior, he developed a reputation as one of the hardest hitters on the team and ranked first with 123 tackles.

== Professional career ==
=== Dallas Cowboys ===
Padjen was selected by the Dallas Cowboys in the 11th round (300th overall) of the 1980 NFL draft. He was waived on August 25.

=== Washington Redskins ===
On April 6, 1981, he was signed as a free agent by the Washington Redskins. He was released on August 27.

=== Baltimore Colts / Indianapolis Colts ===
On March 15, 1982, he was signed as a free agent by the Baltimore Colts, reuniting with his former college head coach Frank Kush. He appeared in 8 games with 3 starts at inside linebacker during the strike shortened season. He missed the game against the Miami Dolphins with an ankle injury. He posted 19 defensive tackles and 6 special teams tackles (tied for fifth on the team).

In 1983, he was named a special teams captain and led the team with 30 tackles.

In 1984, the franchise moved to Indianapolis and he was second on the team with 27 special teams tackles. He was released on August 27, 1985.

On February 24, 1986, he signed a contract with the Arizona Outlaws of the United States Football League, reuniting with his former college head coach Frank Kush. He did not have an opportunity to play, after the league folded before the start of the season.

In 1987, after the NFLPA strike was declared on the third week of the season, those contests were canceled (reducing the 16 game season to 15) and the NFL decided that the games would be played with replacement players. On September 24, Padjen was signed to be a part of the Colts replacement team. He played in one game, before suffering a thigh injury. He did not record any stat and announced his retirement on October 19.
