= Kendall Williams (American football) =

American football player (born 1959)

No. 44
- Positions: Cornerback, return specialist

Personal information
- Born: February 7, 1959 (age 67); Long Beach, California, U.S.
- Listed height: 5 ft 9 in (1.75 m)
- Listed weight: 180 lb (82 kg)

Career information
- High school: Long Beach Polytechnic
- College: Arizona State
- NFL draft: 1982: undrafted

Career history
- Dallas Cowboys (1982)*; Baltimore Colts (1982–1983)
- * Offseason or practice squad member only
- Stats at Pro Football Reference

Kendall Edwin Williams (born February 7, 1959) is an American former professional football cornerback who played for the Baltimore Colts of the National Football League (NFL). He played college football for the Arizona State Sun Devils.

== Early life ==
Kendall Edwin Williams was born on February 7, 1959, in Long Beach, California. He attended Long Beach Polytechnic High School.

== College career ==
Williams played junior college football at Long Beach City College in 1978. He transferred to Arizona State University, where he was a three-year letterman for the Sun Devils from 1979 to 1981. He became a starter in 1979.

== Professional career ==
After going undrafted in the 1982 NFL draft, Williams signed with the Dallas Cowboys on May 3. He was released on August 9, 1982, before the first game of the 1982 preseason.

Williams was signed by the Baltimore Colts on August 22, 1982. He was placed on the reserve/retired list on August 26 due to family problems back home in California. He was activated by the Colts again on May 25, 1983. Williams played in all 16 games, starting four, at cornerback during the 1983 season, recording one interception for 32 yards, one sack, 20 kick returns for 490 yards, and nine punt returns for 43 yards. He led the team in kick returns, kick return yards, and overall return yardage. He was released by the newly-renamed Indianapolis Colts on August 26, 1984.
