= Hal Hunter (American football, born 1959) =

American football coach (born 1959)

Maryland Terrapins football
- Title: Tackles & Tight ends

Personal information
- Born: June 8, 1959 (age 67); Canonsburg, Pennsylvania, U.S.

Career information
- High school: Belle Vernon Area (Belle Vernon, Pennsylvania)
- College: Northwestern

Career history
- William & Mary (1982) Outside linebackers coach & strength coach; Pittsburgh (1983–1984) Offensive line coach; Columbia (1985) Offensive line coach; IUP (1986) Offensive line coach; Akron (1987–1990) Offensive line coach; Vanderbilt (1991–1993) Tackles coach & tight ends coach; Vanderbilt (1994) Offensive line coach; LSU (1995–1998) Offensive line coach; LSU (1999) Assistant head coach; LSU (1999) Interim head coach; Indiana (2000–2001) Offensive coordinator; North Carolina (2002–2005) Offensive line coach; San Diego Chargers (2006–2011) Offensive line coach; San Diego Chargers (2012) Offensive coordinator; Indianapolis Colts (2013–2014) Assistant offensive line coach; Indianapolis Colts (2015) Offensive line coach; Cleveland Browns (2016) Offensive line coach; New York Giants (2018–2019) Offensive line coach; Houston Texans (2022) Assistant offensive line coach; Maryland (2025–present) Tackles/Tight ends

Head coaching record
- Regular season: NCAA: 1–0 (1.000)
- Career: NCAA: 1–0 (1.000)
- Coaching profile at Pro Football Reference

Harold Theo Hunter III (born July 8, 1959) is an American football coach who is the offensive tackle and tight ends coach for Maryland. He has previously served as offensive line coach for the New York Giants, Cleveland Browns, Indianapolis Colts, and San Diego Chargers of the National Football League (NFL). In 1999, he served as the interim head coach of LSU for one game, a 35–10 win over rival Arkansas, after Gerry DiNardo was fired. He was replaced when LSU hired Nick Saban.

== Coaching history ==
=== College ===
Hunter held positions at William & Mary, Pittsburgh, Columbia, Indiana (PA), Vanderbilt, LSU, Indiana and North Carolina from 1982 to 2005.

=== NFL ===
After his stint with North Carolina, he was hired by the San Diego Chargers in 2006 as offensive line coach and held that position until 2011, when he was promoted to offensive coordinator.

On January 30, 2013, Hunter was hired as assistant offensive line coach for the Indianapolis Colts. He was promoted to offensive line coach in 2015. On January 22, 2016, the Cleveland Browns hired hunter as offensive line coach.

On January 30, 2018, Hunter was hired as offensive line coach for the New York Giants under head coach Pat Shurmur.

On February 21, 2022, Hunter was hired as assistant offensive line coach for the Houston Texans.

== Personal life ==
Hunter's father, Hal, also coached in the NFL.

== Head coaching record ==
Year	Team	Overall	Conference	Standing	Bowl/playoffs
LSU Tigers (Southeastern Conference) (1999)
1999	LSU	1–0 (Note: Gerry DiNardo served as LSU's head coach for the first ten games of the 1999 season before he was fired. Hunter was appointed interim head coach for the final game of the season. LSU finished the year with an overall record of 3–8 and a mark of 1–7 in conference play.)	1–0	6th (Western)	
Total:		1–0			
