= Ben Utt =

American football player (born 1959)

No. 64
- Position: Guard

Personal information
- Born: June 13, 1959 (age 67); Richmond, California, U.S.
- Listed height: 6 ft 5 in (1.96 m)
- Listed weight: 275 lb (125 kg)

Career information
- High school: Vidalia (GA)
- College: Georgia Tech
- NFL draft: 1982: undrafted

Career history
- Dallas Cowboys (1981)*; Baltimore/Indianapolis Colts (1982–1989); Atlanta Falcons (1990)*
- * Offseason or practice squad member only
- Stats at Pro Football Reference

Benjamin Michael Utt (born June 13, 1959, in Richmond, California) is an American former professional football player who was a guard for eight seasons with the Baltimore/Indianapolis Colts in the National Football League (NFL). He played college football for the Georgia Tech Yellow Jackets.

Married to Elizabeth Utt and father to two children: Garrett and Olivia. Garrett played Division 1 football from 2007 to 2008 at Duke University, while Olivia plays volleyball for Tulane University.
