= Hal Hunter (American football, born 1932) =

American gridiron football coach (1932–2014)

Profile
- Position: Offensive guard / Linebacker

Personal information
- Born: June 3, 1932; Canonsburg, Pennsylvania, U.S.
- Died: August 28, 2014 (aged 82); Denver, North Carolina, U.S.

Career information
- High school: Canonsburg
- College: Pittsburgh (1953–1955)
- NFL draft: 1956: undrafted

Career history

Playing
- Pittsburgh Steelers (1956)*
- * Offseason or practice squad member only

Coaching
- Avella High School (1956); Berlin High School (1957); Washington & Jefferson (1958) Assistant coach; Richmond (1959–1961) Defensive line coach; West Virginia (1962–1963) Offensive line coach; Maryland (1964–1965) Offensive line coach; Duke (1966–1970) Offensive line coach; Kentucky (1971–1972) Offensive coordinator & offensive line coach; Indiana (1973–1976) Offensive line coach; California (PA) (1977–1980) Head coach & assistant athletic director; Hamilton Tiger-Cats (1981) Offensive coordinator; Baltimore/Indianapolis Colts (1982–1984) Offensive line coach; Indianapolis Colts (1984) Interim head coach; Pittsburgh Steelers (1985–1988) Offensive line: guards/centers coach; Cleveland Browns (1989) Offensive line coach; Cleveland Browns (1990) Special assistant to the head coach; Cleveland Browns (1991–1992) Offensive line coach
- Coaching profile at Pro Football Reference

Harold Theo Hunter Jr. (June 3, 1932 – August 28, 2014) was an American college and professional football coach. He participated in football, wrestling and track at Canonsburg High School in Canonsburg, Pennsylvania. He played college football at Pittsburgh, where he was a three-year letterman at offensive guard and linebacker. Hunter earned Associated Press Honorable Mention All-American honors for his senior season in 1955. He was also a three-year letterman in wrestling at Pittsburgh. He signed with the Pittsburgh Steelers in 1956. Hunter was a football coach at various high schools and colleges from 1956 to 1976, mainly serving as his team's offensive line coach. He was then the head coach at California State College from 1977 to 1980, accumulating a record of 9–30–1. He began his professional coaching career as the Hamilton Tiger-Cats' offensive coordinator in 1981. Hunter later served as an assistant coach for several National Football League (NFL) teams from 1982 to 1992, including a one-game stint as the interim head coach of the Indianapolis Colts in 1984.

== Early life ==
Hunter played high school football at Canonsburg High School in Canonsburg, Pennsylvania, where he was a three-year starter as an offensive and defensive tackle. In 1950, he was co-captain of the WPIAL Class A football champions while earning All-Conference, All-County, All-WPIAL and All-State honors. He was a three-year heavyweight in wrestling at Canonsburg, recording 18 pins with a total of 33 wins, six losses and four ties. Hunter also won three letters in track and field as a sprinter, shot putter, discus thrower and javelin thrower. He was inducted into the Washington-Greene County Chapter of the Pennsylvania Sports Hall of Fame in 2001. He also became an Eagle Scout while he was in high school.

== College career ==
Hunter was a three-year letterman at offensive guard and linebacker for the Pittsburgh Panthers from 1953 to 1955. He was a captain of the 1955 Panthers team that appeared in the 1956 Sugar Bowl. He earned All-East honors and was named Washington County Athlete of the Year in 1955. Hunter also garnered Associated Press Honorable Mention All-American accolades for his senior season in 1955. He was named United Press International's Lineman of the Week and won UPI's Unsung Hero Award for his play against the West Virginia Mountaineers in 1954. He graduated from Pittsburgh with an A. B. Degree. Hunter also later earned a master's degree from West Virginia University in 1962.

He also lettered three years as a heavyweight wrestler for the Panthers. He placed first in the 1953 Great Lakes Open, second in the 1954 Four-I Intercollegiate tournament and third in the 1957 Greco-Roman National Amateur Athletic Union tournament.

== Professional career ==
Hunter signed with the Pittsburgh Steelers of the NFL as an offensive guard after graduating from the University of Pittsburgh in 1956. He started three of the team's four preseason games before going home to be with his family after his father died of a heart attack. He did not make the Steelers active roster and was placed on the team's taxi squad.

== Coaching career ==
Hunter began coaching and teaching at Avella High School in Avella, Pennsylvania in 1956. He coached at Berlin High School in Berlin, Pennsylvania in 1957. He was an assistant coach for the Washington & Jefferson Presidents in 1958. Hunter served as defensive line coach for the Richmond Spiders from 1959 to 1961. He was then the offensive line coach for the West Virginia Mountaineers from 1962 to 1963, the Maryland Terrapins from 1964 to 1965, the Duke Blue Devils from 1966 to 1970 and the Kentucky Wildcats from 1971 to 1972. He was also the offensive coordinator at Kentucky. Hunter served as the offensive line coach for the Indiana Hoosiers from 1973 to 1976. He was the head coach and assistant athletic director for the California Vulcans of California State College from 1977 to 1980. He accumulated a 9–30–1 record with the Vulcans.

Hunter was the offensive coordinator for the Hamilton Tiger-Cats of the Canadian Football League in 1981 under head coach Frank Kush. He later served as the offensive line coach for the NFL's Baltimore/Indianapolis Colts from 1982 to 1984 under Kush. Upon Kush's resignation to become head coach of the Arizona Wranglers of the United States Football League, Hal became the Colts' interim head coach for the final game of the 1984 season. The Colts lost the game 16–10 to the New England Patriots. He was an offensive line coach working with the guards and centers of the Pittsburgh Steelers from 1985 to 1988. Hunter was the offensive line coach of the Cleveland Browns of the NFL in 1989 under coach Bud Carson and was nominated for Offensive Line Coach of the Year. He was then the Browns' special assistant to the head coach in 1990. After the firing of Carson in November 1990, Hunter was hired to be the Browns' offensive line coach by new head coach Bill Belichick on February 20, 1991. Hunter resigned at the end of the 1992 season, saying "I don't think I could live through another year with [Belichick]."

== Scouting career ==
Hunter began working as a scout for the NFL's San Francisco 49ers in 1994. He was later a scout for the Carolina Panthers of the NFL from 1995 until his retirement in 2006. He also served as personnel coordinator of the Panthers from 1998 to 2006.

== Personal life ==
His son, Hal, also coached in the NFL. Hunter died on August 28, 2014, in Denver, North Carolina after a brief illness.

== Head coaching record ==
=== College ===
Year	Team	Overall	Conference	Standing	Bowl/playoffs
California Vulcans (Pennsylvania State Athletic Conference) (1977–1980)
1977	California	2–8	0–6	7th (West)	
1978	California	2–7–1	1–4–1	6th (West)	
1979	California	3–7	1–5	7th (West)	
1980	California	2–8	1–5	7th (West)	
California:		9–30–1	3–20–1		
Total:		9–30–1			

=== NFL ===
Team	Year	Regular season					Postseason			
Team	Year	Won	Lost	Ties	Win %	Finish	Won	Lost	Win %	Result
IND	1984	0	1	0	.000	4th in AFC East	–	–	–	–
Total		0	1	0	.000					
