= Jack Bushofsky =

American football player, coach, scout, and executive

Biographical details
- Born: 1937 or 1938 (age 88–89)

Playing career
- 1958–1960: Austin Peay
- Position: Guard

Coaching career (HC unless noted)
- 1968–1972: Villanova (assistant)
- 1973–1976: Austin Peay

Administrative career (AD unless noted)
- 1977–1978: BLESTO (scout)
- 1979–1982: Tampa Bay Buccaneers (scout)
- 1983–1993: Indianapolis Colts (DPP)
- 1994–1997: Carolina Panthers (scout)
- 1998–2003: Carolina Panthers (DPP)

Head coaching record
- Overall: 13–29–1

Jack Bushofsky is an American former football player, coach, scout, and executive. He served as the head football coach at Austin Peay State University from 1973 to 1976, compiling a record of 13–29–1.

== Head coaching record ==
Year	Team	Overall	Conference	Standing	Bowl/playoffs
Austin Peay Governors (Ohio Valley Conference) (1973–1977)
1973	Austin Peay	2–8	1–6	T–7th	
1974	Austin Peay	3–7–1	1–5–1	7th	
1975	Austin Peay	3–8	3–4	5th	
1976	Austin Peay	5–6	3–4	T–4th	
Austin Peay:		13–29–1	8–19–1		
Total:		13–29–1			
