= Vernon Maxwell (American football) =

American football player (born 1961)

No. 56, 98, 57, 50, 92
- Position: Linebacker

Personal information
- Born: October 25, 1961 (age 65); Birmingham, Alabama, U.S.
- Listed height: 6 ft 2 in (1.88 m)
- Listed weight: 233 lb (106 kg)

Career information
- High school: Verbum Dei (Los Angeles, California)
- College: Arizona State
- NFL draft: 1983: 2nd round, 29th overall pick

Career history
- Baltimore / Indianapolis Colts (1983–1984); San Diego Chargers (1985)*; Detroit Lions (1985–1987); Seattle Seahawks (1989); Phoenix Cardinals (1990)*; Los Angeles Rams (1991)*; Hamilton Tiger-Cats (1991–1992)
- * Offseason or practice squad member only

Awards and highlights
- NFL Defensive Rookie of the Year (1983); PFWA All-Rookie Team (1983); Consensus All-American (1982); 3× First-team All-Pac-10 (1980, 1981, 1982)

Career NFL statistics
- Sacks: 21.5
- Fumble recoveries: 9
- Interceptions: 1
- Stats at Pro Football Reference

Vernon Leroy Maxwell (born October 25, 1961) is an American former professional football player who was a linebacker for seven seasons in the National Football League (NFL) during the 1980s. Maxwell played college football for the Arizona State Sun Devils, earning consensus All-American honors in 1982. He played professionally for the Baltimore/Indianapolis Colts, Detroit Lions and Seattle Seahawks, and was recognized as the NFL Defensive Rookie of the Year.

Maxwell was born in Birmingham, Alabama.
