= Victor Oatis =

American football player (born 1959)

No. 84
- Position: Wide receiver

Personal information
- Born: January 6, 1959 (age 67); Monroe, Louisiana, U.S.
- Listed height: 6 ft 0 in (1.83 m)
- Listed weight: 177 lb (80 kg)

Career information
- High school: Winnsboro (LA)
- College: Northwestern State
- NFL draft: 1983: 6th round, 147th overall pick

Career history
- Philadelphia Eagles (1983)*; Baltimore Colts (1983); Cleveland Browns (1985)*; Miami Dolphins (1985-1986)*
- * Offseason or practice squad member only

Career NFL statistics
- Receptions: 6
- Receiving yards: 93
- Stats at Pro Football Reference

Victor Oatis (born January 6, 1959) is an American former professional football player who was a wide receiver for the Baltimore Colts of the National Football League (NFL) in 1983. He played college football for the Northwestern State Demons.

Competing for the Demons track and field team, Oatis won the 1981 NCAA Division I Outdoor Track and Field Championships in the 4 × 100 m, leading off a team with Joe Delaney, Mario Johnson, and Mark Duper.
