= Cliff Odom =

American football player (born 1958)

No. 58, 49, 93
- Position: Linebacker

Personal information
- Born: August 15, 1958 (age 68); Beaumont, Texas, U.S.
- Listed height: 6 ft 2 in (1.88 m)
- Listed weight: 237 lb (108 kg)

Career information
- High school: French (Jefferson County, Texas)
- College: UT Arlington
- NFL draft: 1980: 3rd round, 72nd overall pick

Career history
- Cleveland Browns (1980); Los Angeles Raiders (1982)*; Baltimore/Indianapolis Colts (1982–1989); Miami Dolphins (1990–1993)
- * Offseason or practice squad member only

Career NFL statistics
- Sacks: 12
- Fumble recoveries: 11
- Interceptions: 1
- Stats at Pro Football Reference

Cliff Odom Sr. (born August 15, 1958) is an American former professional football player who was a linebacker in the National Football League (NFL). A third-round draft choice (72nd overall) in 1980, he played thirteen years in the NFL with the Cleveland Browns, Baltimore and Indianapolis Colts and Miami Dolphins. His son, Chris Odom, played in the NFL for the Cleveland Browns, the team who drafted Cliff but is currently playing for the Arlington Renegades.
