= Phil Smith (American football) =

American football player (born 1960)

No. 86, 83, 88, 71
- Positions: Wide receiver, return specialist

Personal information
- Born: April 28, 1960 (age 66); Los Angeles, California, U.S.
- Listed height: 6 ft 3 in (1.91 m)
- Listed weight: 190 lb (86 kg)

Career information
- High school: Junípero Serra (Gardena, California)
- College: San Diego State
- NFL draft: 1983: 4th round, 85th overall pick

Career history
- Baltimore/Indianapolis Colts (1983–1984); Philadelphia Eagles (1986); Los Angeles Rams (1987); BC Lions (1989)
- Stats at Pro Football Reference

Phillip Keith Smith (born April 28, 1960) is an American former professional football wide receiver and return specialist who played in the National Football League (NFL) with the Baltimore/Indianapolis Colts, Philadelphia Eagles, and Los Angeles Rams. He played college football for the San Diego State Aztecs.

== Early life ==
Phillip Keith Smith was born on April 28, 1960, in Los Angeles, California. He attended Junípero Serra High School in Gardena, California, and graduated in 1978.

== College career ==
Smith enrolled at San Diego State University to play college football for the Aztecs. He was a two-year letterman from 1981 to 1982. He caught 28 passes for 476 yards and two touchdowns in 1981 while also returning 22 kicks for 553 yards. Smith led the Western Athletic Conference in both kick returns and kick return yards. In 1982, he recorded 26 receptions for 355 yards and two touchdowns, and 18 kick returns for 450 yards.

== Professional career ==
Smith was selected by the Baltimore Colts in the fourth round, with the 85th overall pick, of the 1983 NFL draft. He signed with the team on May 19, 1983. He played in one game for the Colts during the 1983 season before being placed on the reserve/non-football injury list on November 1, 1983, due to serious sinus problems. Smith played in all 16 games for the newly-renamed Indianapolis Colts in 1984, totaling no catches on two targets and 32 kick returns for 651 yards and one touchdown. He led the team in kick return yards and scored the Colts' only return touchdown. He was released on July 28, 1985.

Smith signed with the Philadelphia Eagles on February 26, 1986. After a five-reception, 97-yard preseason game against the San Diego Chargers on August 16, Smith was promoted to starter ahead of Kenny Jackson. Smith played in three games, starting two, for the Eagles during the 1986 regular season, catching six passes for 94 yards on ten targets while also returning four punts for 18 yards. He was placed on injured reserve on September 26, 1986, and later released on August 25, 1987.

Smith later started two games for the Los Angeles Rams during the 1987 season, recording three receptions for 95 yards on six targets and two punt returns for five yards. He was released on November 4, 1987.

Smith signed with the BC Lions of the Canadian Football League for the 1989 season. He dressed in five games for the Lions as a slotback, catching seven passes for 114 yards while returning six kickoffs for 91 yards and one punt for nine yards.
