= Alvin Moore (American football) =

American football player (born 1959)

No. 23, 24
- Position: Running back

Personal information
- Born: May 3, 1959 (age 67); Randolph, Arizona, U.S.
- Listed height: 6 ft 0 in (1.83 m)
- Listed weight: 194 lb (88 kg)

Career information
- High school: Coolidge (Coolidge, Arizona)
- College: Arizona State (1978–1982)
- NFL draft: 1983: 7th round, 169th overall pick

Career history
- Baltimore/Indianapolis Colts (1983–1984); Detroit Lions (1985–1986); Seattle Seahawks (1987)

Career NFL statistics
- Rushing yards: 641
- Rushing average: 3.3
- Rushing touchdowns: 7
- Stats at Pro Football Reference

Alvin Moore (born May 3, 1959) is an American former professional football player who was a running back for five seasons in the National Football League (NFL) with the Baltimore/Indianapolis Colts, Detroit Lions and Seattle Seahawks. He was selected by the Colts in the seventh round of the 1983 NFL draft after playing college football for the Arizona State Sun Devils.

== Early life ==
Alvin Moore was born on May 3, 1959, in Randolph, Arizona. He attended Coolidge High School in Coolidge, Arizona.

== College career ==
Moore was a member of the Arizona State Sun Devils from 1978 to 1982. He lettered in 1978, 1979, 1981, and 1982. He rushed 94 times for 448 yards and two touchdowns while catching nine passes for 69 yards in 1978. He also threw a 54-yard touchdown that season. In 1979, Moore totaled 68 carries for 274 yards and a touchdown, and six receptions for 51 yards. In 1981, he rushed 67 times for 343 yards, and one touchdown while catching five passes for 35 yards. He recorded 85 rushing attempts for 348 yards and three touchdowns his senior year in 1982 while also catching 12 passes for 88 yards.

== Professional career ==
Moore was selected by the Baltimore Colts in the seventh round, with the 169th overall pick, of the 1983 NFL draft. He was also a territorial selection of the Arizona Wranglers of the United States Football League in 1983. He officially signed with the Colts on May 22. He played in 15 games for the Colts during his rookie year in 1983, rushing 57 times for 205 yards and one touchdown while catching six passes for 38 yards. He played in 13 games, starting two, for the newly-renamed Indianapolis Colts in 1984, recording 38 carries for 127 yards and two touchdowns, and nine receptions for 52 yards.

On July 25, 1985, Moore was traded to the Detroit Lions for Robbie Martin. Moore appeared in all 16 games, starting five, for the Lions during the 1985 season, rushing 80 times for 221 yards and four touchdowns while catching 19 passes for 154 yards and one touchdown as well. He also returned 13 kicks for 230 yards that season. He was released by the Lions on October 25, 1986, re-signed on November 8, and placed on injured reserve on December 29, 1986. Overall, he played in 13 games during the 1986 season, totaling 19 rushing attempts for 73 yards and eight receptions for 47 yards. Moore was released by the Lions on September 9, 1987.

Moore was signed by the Seattle Seahawks during the 1987 NFL players strike and appeared in one game for the team that season, rushing three times for 15 yards. He was released on October 19, 1987, after the strike ended.
