= Tracy Porter (wide receiver) =

American football player (born 1959)

No. 87, 89
- Position: Wide receiver

Personal information
- Born: June 1, 1959 (age 67); Baton Rouge, Louisiana, U.S.
- Listed height: 6 ft 2 in (1.88 m)
- Listed weight: 196 lb (89 kg)

Career information
- High school: Southern University Lab (LA)
- College: LSU
- NFL draft: 1981: 4th round, 99th overall pick

Career history
- Detroit Lions (1981–1982); Baltimore/Indianapolis Colts (1983–1984); New Orleans Saints (1986)*
- * Offseason or practice squad member only

Career NFL statistics
- Receptions: 79
- Receiving yards: 1,161
- Receiving touchdowns: 3
- Stats at Pro Football Reference

Tracy Randolph Porter (born June 1, 1959) is an American social activist, entrepreneur and former professional football player. He played as a wide receiver for the Detroit Lions and Baltimore/Indianapolis Colts in the National Football League (NFL).

Porter studied Business Administration at Louisiana State University in 1983. He played college football for the LSU Tigers. He is the CEO of Premiere Solutions, a fleet-management company based in California.

Porter is on the executive committee of the Sigma Pi Phi fraternity where he heads the national initiative to increase African-American diversity on company boards and is the chairman of the board at the National Football League Alumni Association.

He is not related to former New Orleans Saints cornerback Tracy Porter, although the younger Porter is a native of Port Allen, Louisiana, which sits on the opposite bank of the Mississippi River from Baton Rouge,, the elder Porter's hometown and home to LSU.
