= Bernard Henry (American football) =

American football player (born 1960)

No. 88, 82
- Position: Wide receiver

Personal information
- Born: April 9, 1960 (age 66); Los Angeles, California, U.S.
- Listed height: 6 ft 1 in (1.85 m)
- Listed weight: 180 lb (82 kg)

Career information
- High school: John C. Fremont (Los Angeles)
- College: Arizona State (1978–1981)
- NFL draft: 1982: undrafted

Career history
- Baltimore/Indianapolis Colts (1982–1985); Los Angeles Rams (1987)

Career NFL statistics
- Receptions: 51
- Receiving yards: 709
- Touchdowns: 6
- Stats at Pro Football Reference

Bernard Henry (born April 9, 1960) is an American former professional football player who was a wide receiver for five seasons in the National Football League (NFL) with the Baltimore/Indianapolis Colts and Los Angeles Rams. He played college football for the Arizona State Sun Devils.

== Early life and college ==
Bernard Henry was born on April 9, 1960, in Los Angeles, California. He attended John C. Fremont High School in Los Angeles.

Henry was a four-year letterman for the Arizona State Sun Devils of Arizona State University from 1978 to 1981. He caught six passes for 94 yards and one touchdown in 1978, 27 passes for 301 yards and one touchdown in 1979, eight passes for 75 yards in 1980, and 39 passes for 647 yards and eight touchdowns in 1981. His eight receiving touchdowns in 1981 were the most in the Pac-10 that season.

== Professional career ==
After going undrafted in the 1982 NFL draft, Henry signed with the Baltimore Colts on May 5, 1982. He played in six games for the Colts during the 1982 season and recorded seven receptions for 110 yards. He was released on August 29, 1983, but re-signed the next day. Henry appeared in 15 games, starting seven, in 1983, catching 30 passes for 416 yards and four touchdowns. He led the team in both receptions and receiving touchdowns for the 1983 season. Henry played in 14 games for the newly renamed Indianapolis Colts in 1984 and caught 11 passes for 139 yards and two touchdowns. He started the first game of the 1985 season, catching two passes for 31 yards, before being released on September 12, 1985.

On September 23, 1987, Henry signed with the Los Angeles Rams during the 1987 NFL players strike. He appeared in three games, starting two, for the Rams and made one 13-yard reception. He was released on October 19, 1987, after the strike ended.
