= Frank Kush =

American football player and coach (1929–2017)

Biographical details
- Born: January 20, 1929; Windber, Pennsylvania, U.S.
- Died: June 22, 2017 (aged 88); Phoenix, Arizona, U.S.

Playing career
- 1950–1952: Michigan State
- Position: Defensive lineman

Coaching career (HC unless noted)
- 1955–1957: Arizona State (line)
- 1958–1979: Arizona State
- 1981: Hamilton Tiger-Cats
- 1982–1984: Baltimore/Indianapolis Colts
- 1985: Arizona Outlaws

Head coaching record
- Overall: 176–54–1 (college); 11–4–1 (CFL); 11–28–1 (NFL); 8–10 (USFL)
- Bowls: 6–1

Accomplishments and honors

Championships
- 2 Border (1959, 1961); 7 WAC (1969–1973, 1975, 1977)

Awards
- AFCA Coach of the Year (1975); Walter Camp Coach of the Year Award (1975); 5× WAC Coach of the Year (1963, 1970, 1971, 1975, 1977); First-team All-American (1952)
- College Football Hall of Fame; Inducted in 1995 (profile)

Frank Joseph Kush (January 20, 1929 – June 22, 2017) was an American football player and coach. As a player he earned All-American honors in 1952 as a defensive lineman playing for the Michigan State Spartans.

He was head coach at Arizona State University from 1958 to 1979, compiling a record of 176–54–1. He was notorious for his brutal training methods in the Arizona heat and left collegiate coaching in 1980 embroiled in a lawsuit and with his program under the cloud of NCAA sanctions.

Kush was also the head coach of the Hamilton Tiger-Cats of the Canadian Football League (CFL) in 1981, the Baltimore and Indianapolis Colts of the National Football League (NFL) from 1982 to 1984, and the Arizona Outlaws of the United States Football League (USFL) in 1985.

Kush was inducted into the College Football Hall of Fame as a coach in 1995.

== Early life and playing career ==
Kush was born in Windber, Pennsylvania. He played three years as a 5'7", 160-pound defensive lineman at Michigan State University from 1950 to 1952, earning All-American honors in 1952 helping the Spartans capture a national championship in his last season.

== College coaching career ==
After a stint in the United States Army, where Kush rose to the rank of first lieutenant as he coached the Fort Benning football team, he accepted a position as line coach at Arizona State College under former assistant Spartan coach Dan Devine. When Devine left in December 1957 for the University of Missouri, Kush was soon promoted to head coach, a post he held for the next 22 years.

During his time at Arizona State, Kush earned a reputation as one of the most physically demanding coaches in the game. He was notorious for abusing his players both physically and emotionally. His daily football practices in the heat of the Arizona desert remain the stuff of legend. One drill was known as "Bull in the Ring." Players form a circle and Kush would put a player in the center. He would then call out a uniform number and blow his whistle. That player called would charge the player in the middle and the two would engage in padded full contact until Kush blew the whistle again. Whichever of the two players gave the best effort would go back to the circle, while the player "dogging it" would remain until Kush decided he could quit.

Another drill consisted of having only a center, quarterback, and two running backs line up on offense, with no other offensive lineman, and run running plays against the entire defense. Kush would run a running back into the line time and time again so he could get used to the punishment he would likely take in games.

The most famous of Kush's motivational techniques was called "Mount Kush." Mount Kush was a steep hill near Camp Tontozona, the Sun Devils' training camp near Payson. It featured several large rocks, cacti, and no shade from the Arizona sun. If Kush felt a player especially needed discipline, that player would have to run up and down that hill numerous times.

During his lengthy career in the desert, Kush compiled a record of 176–54–1 (.764), with only one losing season. In his first eleven years, he captured two conference titles and finished runner-up five times. That success led to him accepting the head coaching job at the University of Pittsburgh on January 4, 1969. However, just five days later, Kush had a change of heart and returned to Arizona State.

Kush's return would begin a memorable era in Sun Devil football history. The Sun Devils won five consecutive Western Athletic Conference championships from 1969 to 1973, going 50–6 (.893) in conference play during this time. During this time, Arizona State won the 1970 Peach Bowl and the first three editions of the Fiesta Bowl. In 1974, the team dropped to 7–5, but bounced back with authority the following year when they went undefeated at 12–0, capping the year with a thrilling 17–14 win over sixth-ranked Nebraska in the Fiesta Bowl, a game in which Kush's son, Danny, kicked three field goals, including the game winner.

During this era ASU was voted as national champions twice. ASU was ranked #1 in 1970 by the Poling System (1935–1984). In 1975, ASU was ranked 2nd place in both the AP and Coaches rankings. However, Sporting News Ranked ASU as the #1 team in College Football for the 1975 season.The National Championship Foundation also recognized ASU as the #1 ranked team in the nation the same year. Neither title is claimed by Arizona State.

A down year in 1976 saw the team fall to 4–7, but another comeback resulted the next year with a 9–3 mark. In that year's Fiesta Bowl, the Sun Devils lost a bowl game for the only time under Kush's leadership, with a 42–30 defeat to Penn State.

The Sun Devils moved to the Pacific-10 Conference for 1978. Kush's team didn't miss a beat, once again finishing 9–3 and defeating Rutgers in the Garden State Bowl. That win would be one of the final highlights of Kush's tenure as controversy and scandal the next year toppled him from his head coaching position.

Kush was very active off the field as well. Not long after becoming head coach, he helped lead the drive for the referendum that elevated Arizona State to university status. Years later, he recalled that officials at the University of Arizona were adamantly opposed to Arizona State becoming a university; they believed U of A should be the only university in the state–an argument that befuddled Kush, since as he put it, "These are supposed to be educated people."

=== Dismissal from Arizona State ===
In September 1979 former Sun Devil punter Kevin Rutledge filed a $1.1 million lawsuit against the school, accusing Kush and his staff of mental and physical harassment that forced him to transfer. The most dramatic charge was that Kush had punched Rutledge in the mouth after a bad punt in the October 28, 1978, game against the Washington Huskies. During the next few weeks, overzealous fans turned things ugly when the insurance office of Rutledge's father suffered a fire and the family's attorney received two death threats.

On October 13, 1979, Kush was fired as head coach for interfering with the school's internal investigation into Rutledge's allegations. Athletic director Fred Miller cited Kush's alleged attempts to pressure players and coaches into keeping quiet. The decision came just three hours before the team's home game against Washington. Kush was allowed to coach the game, with the Sun Devils pulling off an emotional 12–7 upset of the sixth-ranked Huskies, fueled by the angry crowd incensed by the decision. After the game ended, Kush was carried off the field by his team. The win gave him a 3–2 record on the season, but all three victories were later forfeited when it was determined that Arizona State had used ineligible players.

After nearly two years, Kush would be found not liable in the case, but remained absent from the sideline throughout 1980, the first time in more than 30 years that he had been away from the game. Litigation related to the Rutledge incident continued until 1986.

In 1980, the NCAA slapped Arizona State with two years' probation and a ban from postseason play in 1981 for multiple violations under Kush.

== Professional coaching career ==
Kush moved to the Canadian Football League the following year, serving as head coach of the Hamilton Tiger-Cats. In his only season with the team, he led his squad to an 11–4–1 mark and a berth in the CFL Eastern Conference championship game. Controversy followed him to the CFL, however, with Kush quarreling with some Ti-Cats players when he attempted to ban the common practice of taping shoes and ankles.

That performance helped Kush return to the United States when the Baltimore Colts hired him in 1982. Kush brought his heavy-handed coaching style with him to the NFL. His training camp tactics were brutal, even in an era when coaches tended to run roughshod over players. Eight-year NFL veteran guard Ken Huff told a journalist shortly after the Colts' 1982 training camp: "There's more hitting than I've ever done in an NFL camp. For example, one day we did live one-on-one blocking, then we did live half-line blocking, then live pass blocking, then live 11-on-11 blocking. That was an unusual day, but it was representative of the toughness of this camp." Rookie quarterback Mike Pagel, an ASU alumnus, contended that as grueling as Kush's training camp regimen with the Colts was, it paled to his training camps in the desert at Arizona State. Pagel, who played under Kush in 1978 and 1979, said, "This is nothing compared to that. There, we'd have three-a-days, and at the end, all you'd want to do is die."

During the strike-shortened 1982 season, the Colts had the dubious record of being the first NFL team since the 1976 Tampa Bay Buccaneers to not win a single game, finishing 0–8–1. Kush's reputation was such that quarterback John Elway, picked by the Colts first overall in the 1983 NFL draft, all but forced the Colts to trade him to the Denver Broncos after declaring he would never play for Kush. Elway and his father, coach Jack Elway, hated Kush so much that Elway threatened to sit out or play professional baseball rather than play for the Colts.

Controversy continued when during training camp in the summer of 1983, second year receiver Holden Smith poured root beer over Kush after having been cut from the team; Kush had ordered the entire squad to re-run a drill after accusing Smith of loafing. Smith contended that he was injured.

The Colts improved that season to a 7–9 record, then moved to Indianapolis during the off-season, much to the disappointment of Kush who had wanted the team to negotiate a move to Phoenix. After just four wins in fifteen games in 1984, Kush quit on December 13, just days before the final game of the season. Citing a desire to be closer to friends and family, Kush accepted a three-year contract with the United States Football League's Arizona Outlaws.

However, the league folded in August 1986, with Kush then living off his personal services contract with Outlaws owner Bill Tatham by offering assistance to beginners in a local youth football league, joking, "I'm the highest-paid Pop Warner coach in the country." Kush also used his disciplinarian image to serve as director of the Arizona Boys Ranch, a facility used to reform juvenile offenders.

== Life after coaching ==
In 1995, Kush was inducted into the College Football Hall of Fame. In part due to his work at the Arizona Boys Ranch, he was welcomed back to Arizona State as an informal goodwill ambassador a year later. On September 21, 1996, the school held Frank Kush Day and announced that the playing field at Sun Devil Stadium would be named "Frank Kush Field" in his honor. Reflecting Arizona State's rise to national prominence under Kush, the stadium's capacity more than doubled during his tenure, from 30,000 seats when it opened in 1958–the year Kush became head coach–to 70,311 seats when he was ousted. On the same night Arizona State went on to upset then #1 Nebraska in a dramatic 19–0 shutout, handing the Cornhuskers their first loss in over two seasons. In addition to the field honors, a bronze statue was placed outside the stadium.

On July 26, 2000, Kush was officially hired by Arizona State as an assistant to the athletic director, serving as a fund-raiser for the athletic department. He died on June 22, 2017, at the age of 88.

== Head coaching record ==
=== College ===
Year	Team	Overall	Conference	Standing	Bowl/playoffs	Coaches^{#}	AP^{°}
Arizona State Sun Devils (Border Conference) (1958–1961)
1958	Arizona State	7–3	4–1	2nd			
1959	Arizona State	10–1	5–0	1st			
1960	Arizona State	7–3	3–2	3rd			
1961	Arizona State	7–3	3–0	1st			
Arizona State Sun Devils (Western Athletic Conference) (1962–1977)
1962	Arizona State	7–2–1	1–1	NA (Note: Arizona State played fewer than qualifying number of conference games.)		18	
1963	Arizona State	8–1	3–0	NA		13	
1964	Arizona State	8–2	0–2	NA			
1965	Arizona State	6–4	3–1	2nd			
1966	Arizona State	5–5	3–2	T–2nd			
1967	Arizona State	8–2	4–1	2nd		20	
1968	Arizona State	8–2	5–1	T–2nd			
1969	Arizona State	8–2	6–1	1st			
1970	Arizona State	11–0	7–0	1st	W Peach	8	6
1971	Arizona State	11–1	7–0	1st	W Fiesta	6	8
1972	Arizona State	10–2	5–1	1st	W Fiesta	13	13
1973	Arizona State	11–1	6–1	T–1st	W Fiesta	10	9
1974	Arizona State	7–5	4–3	3rd			
1975	Arizona State	12–0	7–0	1st	W Fiesta	2	2
1976	Arizona State	4–7	4–3	3rd			
1977	Arizona State	9–3	6–1	T–1st	L Fiesta	18	18
Arizona State Sun Devils (Pacific-10 Conference) (1978–1979)
1978	Arizona State	9–3	4–3	T–4th	W Garden State	19	
1979	Arizona State	3–2 (Note: Arizona state later forfeited their three wins in 1979 under Kush. The final seven games of the season were coached by Bob Owens.)	2–1				
Arizona State:		176–54–1	92–25				
Total:		176–54–1					
National championship Conference title Conference division title or championship game berth
^{#}Rankings from final Coaches Poll.; ^{°}Rankings from final AP Poll.

=== NFL ===
Team	Year	Regular season					Postseason			
Team	Year	Won	Lost	Ties	Win %	Finish	Won	Lost	Win %	Result
BAL	1982	0	8	1	.056	14th in AFC	-	-	-	-
BAL	1983	7	9	0	.438	4th in AFC East	-	-	-	-
IND	1984	4	11	0	.267	4th in AFC East	-	-	-	-
Total		11	28	1	.288		-	-	-	
