= Newton Williams (American football) =

American football player (born 1959)

No. 45, 39
- Position: Running back

Personal information
- Born: May 10, 1959 (age 67); Charlotte, North Carolina, U.S.
- Listed height: 5 ft 10 in (1.78 m)
- Listed weight: 204 lb (93 kg)

Career information
- High school: Huntersville (NC) North Mecklenburg
- College: Arizona State
- NFL draft: 1982: 5th round, 139th overall pick

Career history
- San Francisco 49ers (1982); Baltimore Colts (1983)

Career NFL statistics
- Rushing yards: 77
- Rushing average: 2.8
- Receptions: 4
- Receiving yards: 46
- Stats at Pro Football Reference

Newton Williams (born May 10, 1959) is an American former professional football player who was a running back in the National Football League (NFL). He played for the San Francisco 49ers in 1982 and for the Baltimore Colts in 1983. He played college football for the Arizona State Sun Devils.
