= Mike Pagel =

American football player (born 1960)

No. 18, 10, 14
- Position: Quarterback

Personal information
- Born: September 13, 1960 (age 66); Douglas, Arizona, U.S.
- Listed height: 6 ft 2 in (1.88 m)
- Listed weight: 206 lb (93 kg)

Career information
- High school: Washington (Phoenix, Arizona)
- College: Arizona State (1978–1981)
- NFL draft: 1982: 4th round, 84th overall pick

Career history
- Baltimore / Indianapolis Colts (1982–1985); Cleveland Browns (1986–1990); Los Angeles Rams (1991–1993); Massachusetts Marauders (1994)

Awards and highlights
- First-team All-Pac-10 (1981)

Career NFL statistics
- Passing attempts: 1,509
- Passing completions: 756
- Completion percentage: 48.5%
- TD–INT: 49–63
- Passing yards: 9,414
- Passer rating: 63.3
- Rushing yards: 831
- Rushing touchdowns: 4
- Stats at Pro Football Reference

Career AFL statistics
- Completions: 205
- Attempts: 380
- Touchdowns: 46
- Interceptions: 14
- Passing yards: 2,713
- Stats at ArenaFan.com

Mike John Pagel (/ˈpeɪɡəl/ PAY-gəl; born September 13, 1960) is an American former professional football player who was a quarterback in the National Football League (NFL). He played college football for the Arizona State Sun Devils and was selected by the Baltimore Colts in the fourth round of the 1982 NFL draft.

== Professional career ==
=== Baltimore Colts ===
Drafted the same year as Art Schlichter, Pagel was drafted to be groomed as a backup. Generally, however, he out-played Schlichter. Pagel bounced in and out of the starting quarterback job for the Colts in his four seasons with the team, alternating with Schlichter, Matt Kofler, and Mark Herrmann. He was the last Colt to wear #18 before Peyton Manning.

=== Cleveland Browns ===
He was traded to Cleveland for the 1986 season and served for the next five years there strictly as a backup. In 1988, he took over for an injured Bernie Kosar and Don Strock and played well in a playoff loss to the Houston Oilers.

=== Los Angeles Rams ===
Pagel finished up the last three years with the Los Angeles Rams, never garnering more than mop-up duties.

== Life after football ==
Pagel now resides in suburban Cleveland, Ohio, and is a project manager for AT&T. He also serves as analyst for the pregame, halftime and postgame shows on WTAM and WMMS during Browns games and offers television color commentary on college games on Fox Sports Network. Pagel also provides video commentary on his own site Pagel On Point. In addition, he presently is the quarterback coach at Normandy High School in Parma, Ohio.

== NFL career statistics ==
Legend
**Bold**	Career high

Year	Team	Games			Passing									Rushing					Sacks	
Year	Team	GP	GS	Record	Cmp	Att	Pct	Yds	Y/A	Lng	TD	Int	Rtg	Att	Yds	Avg	Lng	TD	Sck	Yds
1982	BAL	9	9	0−8−1	111	221	50.2	1,281	5.8	53	5	7	62.4	19	82	4.3	32	1	16	129
1983	BAL	15	**15**	**7−8**	163	328	49.7	2,353	7.2	72	12	**17**	64.0	**54**	**441**	**8.2**	**33**	0	**40**	**278**
1984	IND	11	9	3−6	114	212	53.8	1,426	6.7	54	8	8	71.8	26	149	5.7	23	1	28	201
1985	IND	**16**	14	5−9	**199**	**393**	50.6	**2,414**	6.1	**80**	**14**	15	65.8	25	160	6.4	29	**2**	25	180
1986	CLE	1	0	−	2	3	**66.7**	53	**17.7**	45	0	0	**109.7**	2	0	0.0	0	0	0	0
1987	CLE	4	0	−	0	0	0.0	0	0.0	0	0	0	0.0	0	0	0.0	0	0	0	0
1988	CLE	5	4	2−2	71	134	53.0	736	5.5	28	3	4	64.1	4	1	0.3	5	0	1	9
1989	CLE	**16**	0	−	5	14	35.7	60	4.3	18	1	1	43.7	2	-1	-0.5	4	0	0	0
1990	CLE	**16**	3	0−3	69	148	46.6	819	5.5	32	3	8	48.2	3	-1	-0.5	0	0	5	40
1991	RAM	**16**	0	−	11	27	40.7	150	5.6	30	2	0	83.9	0	0	0.0	0	0	0	0
1992	RAM	**16**	0	−	8	20	40.0	99	5.0	22	1	2	33.1	1	0	0.0	0	0	0	0
1993	RAM	7	0	−	3	9	33.3	23	2.6	10	0	1	2.8	0	0	0.0	0	0	0	0
Career		132	54	17−36−1	756	1,509	50.1	9,414	6.2	80	49	63	63.3	136	831	6.1	33	4	115	837
