= Indiana Register of Historic Sites and Structures =

Register of historic sites in Indiana

Location of the state of Indiana in the United States, highlighted in red.

The Indiana Register of Historic Sites and Structures was created in 1981 by the Indiana General Assembly. The Survey and Registration Section of the Indiana Division of Historic Preservation and Archaeology oversees this state register. All places within Indiana that are listed on the National Register of Historic Places are automatically on Indiana's Register. Additional sites are on the state register, as the state's register does not require as many documents and sources for inclusion.

== State register ==
The following is a list of historic sites on the Indiana register, but not the national register. For a list of historic sites on both the national register and the state register, see National Register of Historic Places listings in Indiana.

| Name | Image | Location | County | Description |
|---|---|---|---|---|
| Bash Building | | Fort Wayne; 41.0813°N 85.1413°W | Allen | |
| Montgomery and Edith Beaver House | | Fort Wayne; 41.0604°N 85.1467°W | Allen | |
| Fox Island Nature Preserve Archaeological District | | Fort Wayne; 41.0193°N 85.2370°W | Allen | |
| William and Louise Thiel House | | Fort Wayne; 41.0787°N 85.1615°W | Allen | |
| Lambert-Noblitt House | | Columbus; 39.2174°N 85.9221°W | Bartholomew | |
| Issac and Lula Breeding Farm | | Edinburgh; 39.318°N 85.9546°W | Bartholomew | |
| George and Elizabeth Newlin House | | Columbus; 39.2288°N 85.9204°W | Bartholomew | |
| Howard School | | Perry Township; 39.9309°N 86.3825°W | Boone | |
| Jacob Jones House | | Lebanon; 40.0495°N 86.4687°W | Boone | |
| Jackson Township School Gymnasium | | Camden; 40.6100°N 86.5378°W | Carroll | |
| Carroll County Bridge#85 | | Delphi; 40.5951°N 86.6787°W | Carroll | Also known as the Paint Creek Bridge. |
| Reed Case House | | Delphi; 40.5917°N 86.6805°W | Carroll | |
| Law Offices and Pharos Newspaper Building | | Logansport; 40.7545°N 86.3659°W | Cass | |
| People's Bank Building | | Logansport; 40.7521°N 86.3667°W | Cass | |
| Walton-Tipton Township Public Library | | Walton; 40.6611°N 86.2427°W | Cass | |
| Montrose (John McCulloch House) | | Clarksville; 38.3051°N 85.7767°W | Clark | |
| Schwartz-Voigt Farm | | Jeffersonville; 38.3398°N 85.6906°W | Clark | |
| Avery House | | Frankfort; 40.2808°N 86.5166°W | Clinton | |
| Mary Ann Cole Archaeological Site | | Leavenworth; 38.1827°N 86.3280°W | Crawford | |
| Wolber-Stryker Stone Wall | | Lawrenceburg; 39.1272°N 84.9099°W | Dearborn | |
| Second Dearborn County Courthouse and Offices | | Wilmington; 39.0624°N 84.9454°W | Dearborn | |
| Charles Zoller House | | Greensburg; 39.3363°N 85.4797°W | Decatur | |
| Altona Baptist Church | | Altona; 41.3511°N 85.1563°W | DeKalb | |
| Samuel DePew House | | Richland Township; 41.3806°N 85.1712°W | DeKalb | |
| Keyser Township District School 5 | | Garrett; 41.3301°N 85.1352°W | DeKalb | |
| Robert Lindsey Bartlett House | | Salem Township; 40.0958°N 85.5717°W | Delaware | |
| High Street United Methodist Church | | Muncie; 40.1922°N 85.3882°W | Delaware | |
| McCain Archaeological Site | | | Dubois | |
| Johann Bernard Woebkenberg Farm | | | Dubois | |
| Dale-Zook House | | | Elkhart | |
| Elkhart River Race Industrial District | | | Elkhart | |
| Phelps House/Knickerbocker Weddings | | | Elkhart | |
| P. H. and F. M. Roots Company Factory | | | Fayette | |
| J.D. Fine Boggs House | | | Fountain | |
| Alley Ford Bridge#48 | | | Franklin | |
| Grass Creek Railroad Depot | | Grass Creek | Fulton | |
| Jasper Newton Davidson House | | | Gibson | |
| Moore Rockshelter Archaeological Site | | | Gibson | |
| Moss Opera House | | | Greene | |
| Arcadia Depot | | Arcadia | Hamilton | |
| Carmel Monon R.R. Depot | | Carmel | Hamilton | |
| Forest Park Log Cabin | | | Hamilton | |
| Old Carmel Library | | Carmel | Hamilton | |
| S. Waltz Farm | | | Hamilton | |
| Leora Brown School | | Corydon | Harrison | |
| Squire Boone Gristmill | | Mauckport; 38°3′51″N 86°8′4″W | Harrison | Grist mill of Daniel Boone's brother Squire Boone |
| Walker School (Lincoln Township District School #1) | | Brownsburg | Hendricks | |
| North Salem Commercial Historic District | | North Salem | Hendricks | |
| Wabash & Erie Canal | | | Huntington | |
| William Ferris House | | | Jay | |
| Redkey City Building | | Redkey | Jay | |
| Butler Elementary School | | | Jennings | |
| Jennings County Carnegie Library | | North Vernon | Jennings | |
| Grafton-Peek Building | | | Johnson | |
| William Barringer Brown House | | | Lake | |
| Wicker Memorial Park | | | Lake | |
| Martin and Susan Wood House | | | Lake | |
| Charles Danitschek Log Cabin | | | LaPorte | |
| Haskell and Barker Car and Manufacturing Company | | | LaPorte | |
| Logan-Taylor House | | | LaPorte | |
| Long Beach Town Center Building | | Long Beach | LaPorte | |
| Milwaukee Railroad Depot | | Bedford | Lawrence | |
| William Stickles Hotel | | Bedford | Lawrence | |
| Big Four Railroad Station | | Anderson; 40.1012°N 85.6786°W | Madison | |
| Interurban Depot Number 10 | | Summitville | Madison | |
| Mendon Episcopal Church | | | Madison | |
| Brookside Building | | Indianapolis; 39.7816°N 86.1227°W | Marion | |
| Charity Dye School No. 27 | | Indianapolis; 39.7904°N 86.1474°W | Marion | |
| Charles W. Fairbanks House | | Indianapolis; 39.8097°N 86.1573°W | Marion | |
| Chicago, Indianapolis, & Louisville Railroad Bridge#B178.9 | | Indianapolis; 39.8203°N 86.1366°W | Marion | |
| Daubenspeck Farm | | Indianapolis; 39.9173°N 86.1852°W | Marion | |
| Edwards-Aufderheide House | | Indianapolis; 39.8828°N 86.1542°W | Marion | |
| First German Reformed Church & School | | Indianapolis; 39.7815°N 86.1120°W | Marion | |
| Fisher House (Indianapolis) | | Indianapolis; 39.8630°N 86.1791°W | Marion | |
| Florence Fay School No. 21 | | Indianapolis; 39.7594°N 86.1158°W | Marion | |
| Fowler-Mundy Pioneer Cemetery | | Indianapolis; 39.6603°N 86.2058°W | Marion | |
| General Motors Buick Showroom Building | | Indianapolis; 39.7844°N 86.1579°W | Marion | |
| Holy Cross–Westminster Historic District | | Indianapolis; 39.7712°N 86.1335°W | Marion | |
| Hotel Barton | | Indianapolis; 39.7743°N 86.1538°W | Marion | |
| Indiana Dental College Building | | Indianapolis; 39.7696°N 86.1547°W | Marion | |
| Indianapolis Automobile Industry Thematic District | | Indianapolis, Speedway (various locations) | Marion | |
| Julius Gally Wines & Cigars | | Indianapolis; 39.7802°N 86.1505°W | Marion | |
| Kassebaum Building | | Indianapolis; 39.8704°N 86.1426°W | Marion | |
| Lawrence High School (Indiana) | | Lawrence; 39.8401°N 86.0219°W | Marion | |
| Minnie Hartmann School No. 78 | | Indianapolis; 39.7732°N 86.1030°W | Marion | |
| Oliver P. Morton School No. 29 | | Indianapolis; 39.7963°N 86.1444°W | Marion | |
| Paul C. Stetson School No. 76 | | Indianapolis; 39.8096°N 86.1444°W | Marion | |
| Reuben Wells | | Indianapolis; The Children's Museum of Indianapolis; 39°48′39″N 86°9′27″W | Marion | |
| Spring Valley Cemetery | | Lawrence; 39.8584°N 86.0108°W | Marion | |
| West Park Christian Church | | Indianapolis; 39.7662°N 86.2044°W | Marion | |
| Culver Railroad Station | | Culver | Marshall | |
| District #3 Schoolhouse | | | Marshall | |
| Immanuel Lutheran Church | | | Marshall | |
| Lewis Brooks Home | | | Martin | |
| Paw Paw Church & Cemetery | | | Miami | |
| Saint Charles Borromeo Catholic Church | | | Miami | |
| Borland House & Furst Quarry | | | Monroe | |
| John Campbell House | | | Monroe | |
| North Indiana Avenue Historic District | | | Monroe | |
| Montgomery County Bridge#49 | | | Montgomery | |
| Jones Schoolhouse | | | Morgan | |
| Newton County Bridge#57 | | The Conrad Bridge; 41°06′11.2″N 87°26′58.3″W | Newton | |
| Wilmot Milling Company | | | Noble | |
| David Brown House | | | Ohio | |
| Jeffrey and Janet Pickett Log House | | | Ohio | |
| James Alverson House | | | Owen | |
| J.J. Daniels House | | | Parke | J.J. Daniels House and former Rockville Motel |
| Governor Joseph Albert Wright House | | | Parke | |
| Clarence H. Martin House | | | Porter | |
| Bone Bank Archaeological Site | | | Posey | |
| Hovey Lake-Klein Archeological Site | | 37°49′49″N 87°57′13″W | Posey | Archaeological site of the Mississippian culture |
| Medaryville Calaboose | | | Pulaski | |
| Highnote House | | | Putnam | |
| Julian Family Home | | | Putnam | |
| John Eckert & Sons Hardware Store | | | Ripley | |
| Hackleman Log Cabin | | | Rush | |
| Downtown South Bend Multiple Resources Area | | South Bend | St. Joseph | |
| Union Station (South Bend) | | South Bend | St. Joseph | |
| Daniel Ward House | | | St. Joseph | |
| Vevay Historic District | | | Switzerland | |
| Agriculture Hall | | | Tippecanoe | |
| Joseph Hawkins House | | | Tippecanoe | |
| Hawkins-Bower House | | | Tippecanoe | |
| Levi & Lucy Morehouse Farm | | | Tippecanoe | |
| John Purdue Block | | | Tippecanoe | |
| Downtown Evansville Multiple Resource Area | | | Vanderburgh | |
| Old Fellows Temple | | Terre Haute | Vigo | |
| Alfred Pegg House | | | Vigo | |
| U.S. Trust Company Building | | | Vigo | |
| Hopewell Church | | | Wabash | |
| Presbyterian Church of Williamsport | | Williamsport | Warren | |
| Livonia Presbyterian Church | | Livonia | Washington | |
| Salem Presbyterian Church | | Salem | Washington | |
| Charles Deam House & Arboretum | | | Wells | |
| Leaman-Stewart Farm | | | Whitley | |
| Jonas Nolt Homestead | | | Whitley | |
| Swihart House | | | Whitley | |

== See also ==
- National Register of Historic Places listings in Indiana
- List of National Historic Landmarks in Indiana
- List of State Historic Sites in Indiana
