= WHJE =

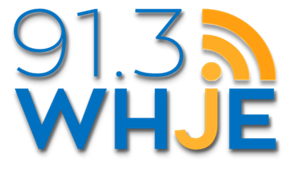
- Carmel, Indiana; United States
- Frequency: 91.3 MHz
- Branding: The Edge

Programming
- Format: Alternative

Ownership
- Owner: Carmel/Clay School Corporation

History
- First air date: 1963

Technical information
- Licensing authority: FCC
- Facility ID: 9004
- Class: A
- ERP: 400 watts
- HAAT: 30.0 meters
- Transmitter coordinates: 39°58′45.00″N 86°7′10.00″W

Links
- Public license information: Public file; LMS
- Webcast: Listen Live
- Website: whje.com

WHJE (91.3 FM) is a student-run radio station broadcasting an alternative format, licensed to Carmel, Indiana, United States. The station is currently owned by the Carmel Clay School Corporation. The transmitter is located atop Carmel High School, in Carmel, Indiana. WHJE is a Non-Commercial Educational high school station. All radio staff members are Carmel High School students ranging from sophomores through seniors.

WHJE was founded in 1963 by Carmel High School Principal Earl F. Lemme, and has been in continuous operation since then. The program is managed by Mr. Dominic James who has been in this position since the 2017-18 year.

WHJE has several notable alumni with prominent roles in broadcasting, including positions with the Indiana Pacers (NBA), Indiana Fever (WNBA), National Public Radio (NPR) and ESPN.Indianapolis Motor Speedway Radio network and Indianapolis Colts. SiriusXM NASCAR radio

Former logo

== Content and Coverage ==
The station broadcasts 15 varsity and junior varsity Carmel sports live from August to June, with the most listened-to games being varsity football in the fall, boys varsity basketball in the winter, and varsity baseball in the spring. Other prominent sports broadcast by WHJE include soccer (boys and girls), girls varsity basketball, junior-varsity basketball (boys and girls), Carmel Icehounds hockey, and varsity softball. Most years feature 100 or more individual sporting event broadcasts.

Students occupy all the roles of live broadcasts, and have recently broadcast from the Indianapolis Colts' Lucas Oil Stadium (2008, 2009, 2011, 2016, 2018, and 2019 IHSAA 6A football State Championship), and Banker's Life Fieldhouse (2012, 2013, 2018, 2019, and 2021 IHSAA 4A Boys Basketball State Championship). Students have also had the opportunity to broadcast Carmel Greyhounds baseball games from Victory Field, the home of the Indianapolis Indians "AAA" Minor League baseball club.

Students produce between 20 and 30 different weekly live shows, and produce between 10 and 20 weekly podcasts, depending on the time of year. Many of the episodes are now available for listening on the iTunes Podcasts app, TuneIn Radio, and other streaming services. Shows and podcasts range from topics such as high school, college, and pro sports to various genres of music like rock or pop.

== Awards ==
WHJE has won many awards at both the state, regional, and national level. In 2008, 2009, 2013, 2014, 2016, and 2020, WHJE was named "Best High School Radio Station" in the state of Indiana by the Indiana Association of School Broadcasters (IASB). In the 2018 Intercollegiate Broadcasting System (IBS) High School Radio Awards, WHJE was nominated for 25 categories, and took home 10 1st-Place trophies. In the 2019 edition of the IBS Awards, 62 submissions by WHJE were chosen as finalists in 45 categories, with over a dozen 1st-place awards.

They were also named one of "The 40 Best Little Radio Stations in the U.S." by Paste Magazine in September 2010.
