= 2023 Carmel mayoral election =

- November 7, 2023
Candidate	Sue Finkam	Miles Nelson
Party	Republican	Democratic
Popular vote	18,042	13,463
Percentage	56.6%	42.2%
- Precinct results Finkam: 40–50% 50–60% 60–70% 70–80% Nelson: 40–50% 50–60%
Mayor before election
James Brainard
Republican
Elected mayor
Sue Finkam
Republican

The 2023 Carmel mayoral election took place on November 7, 2023. Republican nominee Sue Finkam defeated Democrat Miles Nelson by a 14.4% margin to become the next mayor.

Incumbent Republican Mayor James Brainard, first elected in 1995, chose to retire, creating an open race for the position for the first time in 28 years. In the party primaries held on May 2, 2023, Republican City Councilor Sue Finkam bested two other GOP candidates to advance to the November 7 general election, while Democrat Miles Nelson ran unopposed in the Democratic primary and advanced automatically.

Finkam's general election campaign priorities included boosting fiscal responsibility by adopting zero-based budgeting in the first year, crime prevention and public safety, expanding community involvement in development projects (specifically multifamily housing projects), and increasing government transparency, as outlined in the vision plan published and promoted by her campaign. Nelson's campaign primarily focused on his opposition to the conservative parent advocacy group Moms for Liberty, and concerns he had about their possible influence on Carmel Clay Schools policy which is set by the school board. Notably, there is no conservative majority on the current school board following the 2022 school board elections.

== Background ==
Politically, Carmel has historically been a Republican stronghold, having consistently voted for Republicans in local, state, and federal elections for decades. Since 2020, however, Carmel has become increasingly competitive for both parties. In 2020, the city voted for Democratic presidential candidate Joe Biden, and in 2022, the Democrats won Carmel in the 2022 Indiana Secretary of State election, along with 2 of the 3 school board seats where the more conservative candidates lost, while Republican candidates prevailed in Carmel in the 2020 Indiana gubernatorial election, as well as the 2020 and 2022 Indiana's 5th congressional district House of Representatives elections. Councilor Miles Nelson's 2019 win in the city's West district marked the first time a Democrat had ever won a seat on the Carmel city council.

Mayor James Brainard was first elected to be Mayor of Carmel, Indiana in 1995 and took office in 1996. During his seven-term mayoralty, he championed redevelopment projects, including a well-known push for roundabouts, and the city's population more than doubled. As a result of his broad popularity, Brainard was not seriously challenged in any of his reelection bids through 2019. In 2019, Hamilton County Councilor Fred Glynn challenged Brainard in the Republican primary, receiving 44.2% of the vote. Glynn's 2019 campaign repeatedly criticized Brainard for his extensive public spending projects, overdevelopment and spending plans. Brainard announced his intention to retire in September 2022 after serving for seven terms.

== Republican primary ==
At-large Councilor and small business owner Kevin Rider announced his decision to run for the GOP nomination a week after Brainard's decision to retire, admitting that he had been having conversations about running earlier in the year as well. Councilor and businesswoman Sue Finkam, who represents Carmel's Northeast District, announced her intention to seek the GOP nomination a month later in November 2022. Fred Glynn, former Hamilton County Councilor who had previously challenged Mayor James Brainard in 2019, filed his paperwork to run less than two hours before the filing deadline closed.

Mayor James Brainard endorsed Councilor Kevin Rider on April 7 after initially refraining from endorsing anyone, stating that the primary results could "reverse the progress" Carmel had made during his tenure. His concerns appeared to be aimed at Fred Glynn's campaign priorities.

=== Candidates ===
==== Declared ====
- Sue Finkam, city councilor
- Fred Glynn, former Hamilton County councilor
- Kevin Rider, city councilor

==== Declined ====
- James Brainard, incumbent mayor

=== Endorsements ===
Sue Finkam

Statewide officials

- Kelly Mitchell, 54th Indiana State Treasurer (2014–2022)

Local officials

- Dottie Hancock, former Mayor of Carmel (1988–1992)

Organizations

- Fraternal Order of Police Lodge 185
Kevin Rider

Local officials

- James Brainard, Mayor of Carmel (1996–2024)
- Jane Reiman, former Mayor of Carmel (1980–1988)
- Jeff Worrell, city council president

Organizations

- International Association of Fire Fighters Local 4444

=== Debate ===
The GOP debate held some disagreements. Councilors Sue Finkam and Kevin Rider both tried to position themselves in alignment with Mayor Brainard, while noting they would temper some of his spending priorities. Councilor Sue Finkam accused Rider of threats towards her donors. At the debate, Finkam said, "Many, many professionals call us and say they get calls directly from Councilman Rider saying they will not do business with the city of Carmel if they donate to our campaign, period." Fred Glynn announced he would take no money from vendors who do business with Carmel, while Rider pointed to his positive campaign and also noted he had taken campaign contributions from people who do business with the city. Candidates agreed on the need for more communication from the City Hall, and all three candidates criticized some of the priorities decided on by the Carmel Redevelopment Commission, a non-elected board and a longstanding priority of Mayor Brainard's. The candidates also criticized the study for public transit in Carmel, agreeing that public transportation wasn't a priority.

Date	Time (ET)	Place	Moderators	Ref
March 28, 2023	6:30 pm	The Palladium at the Center for the Performing Arts, Carmel, Indiana	Ann Marie Shambaugh	

=== Results ===
Republican primary
Party	Candidate	Votes	%
Republican	Sue Finkam	4,692	35.8
Republican	Fred Glynn	4,236	32.3
Republican	Kevin Rider	4,190	31.9
Total votes		23,228	100.0

== Democratic primary ==
City Councilor Miles Nelson filed to run in January 2023, making him the only Democrat in the race. Nelson is a local business owner and the brother of Carmel Clay Schools Board Member and Board Secretary Jennifer Nelson-Williams.

=== Candidates ===
==== Declared ====
- Miles Nelson, city councilor

== Write-ins ==
=== Candidates ===
==== Declared ====
- Darin Johnson

== General election ==
=== Debate ===
Date	Time (ET)	Place	Moderators	Ref
October 2, 2023	7:00 pm	The Palladium at the Center for the Performing Arts, Carmel, Indiana	Ann Marie Shambaugh	

=== Polling ===
Poll source	Date(s) administered	Sample size (Note: Key: A – all adults RV – registered voters LV – likely voters V – unclear)	Margin of error	Sue Finkam	Miles Nelson	Undecided
Sue Finkam for Carmel Mayor (Note: Poll sponsored by Finkam's campaign.)	June 26–27, 2023	400 (RV)	± 4.8%	48%	35%	16%

=== Fundraising ===
Campaign finance reports as of October 20, 2023
Candidate	Raised	Spent	Cash on hand
Sue Finkam (R)	$820,965	$540,197	$280,768
Miles Nelson (D)	$460,084	$342,403	$117,681

=== Endorsements ===
Sue Finkam

Statewide officials

- Eric Holcomb, Governor of Indiana (2017–2025)
- Kelly Mitchell, 54th Indiana State Treasurer (2014–2022)

Local officials

- James Brainard, Mayor of Carmel (1996–present)
- Dottie Hancock, former Mayor of Carmel (1988–1992)

Organizations

- Fraternal Order of Police Lodge 185
- International Association of Fire Fighters Local 4444
Miles Nelson

U.S Senators

- Evan Bayh, U.S. Senator from Indiana (1999–2011), 46th Governor of Indiana (1989–1997)

State legislators

- J. D. Ford, state senator from the 29th district (2018–present)
- Victoria Garcia Wilburn, state representative for the 32nd district (2022–present)
- Fady Qaddoura, state senator from the 29th district (2020–present)

Organizations

- AFL-CIO
- Moms Demand Action

=== Results ===
2023 Carmel mayoral election
Party	Candidate	Votes	%	±%
Republican	Sue Finkam	18,042	56.6%	
Democratic	Miles Nelson	13,463	42.2%	
Write-in		371	1.2%	
Total votes		31,876	100.0	

== Notes ==
Partisan clients
