= Creekside Middle School =

Creekside Middle School may refer to:

- Creekside Middle School (Carmel, Indiana)
- Creekside Middle School (Castro Valley, California)
- Creekside Middle School (Rohnert Park, California)
- Creekside Middle School (Woodstock, Illinois)
- Creekside Middle School in Port Orange, Florida, part of Volusia_County_Schools
