= Shawn Heffern =

American football player (born 1964)

No. 79
- Position: Offensive tackle

Personal information
- Born: March 15, 1964 (age 62); Toledo, Ohio, U.S.
- Listed height: 6 ft 5 in (1.96 m)
- Listed weight: 270 lb (122 kg)

Career information
- High school: Carmel (Carmel, Indiana)
- College: Notre Dame
- NFL draft: 1987: undrafted

Career history
- Cleveland Browns (1987)*; Indianapolis Colts (1987)
- * Offseason or practice squad member only

Career NFL statistics
- Games played: 1
- Stats at Pro Football Reference

Shawn Patrick Heffern (born March 15, 1964) is an American former professional football player who was a tackle for the Indianapolis Colts of the National Football League (NFL). He played college football for the Notre Dame Fighting Irish after being highly recruited out of Carmel High School.
