= Avriel Shull =

American architect (1931–1976)

- Born: Avriel Joy Christie; February 9, 1931; Hamilton County, Indiana, U.S.
- Died: March 6, 1976 (aged 45); Noblesville, Hamilton County, Indiana, U.S.
- Resting place: Crown Hill Cemetery, NICH 47-D
- Occupations: Architectural designer/builder and interior decorator
- Years active: 1950s–1976
- Spouse: Richard K. Shull
- Children: 2

Avriel Shull (born Avriel Joy Christie; February 9, 1931 – March 6, 1976) was an American architectural designer/builder and interior decorator whose career spanned from the 1950s until her death in 1976. She is best known for her mid-century modern architectural designs, which contradicted the traditional tastes of mid-century Indiana. Most of Shull's projects were single-family homes around Hamilton and Marion counties in central Indiana, most notably the homes in Christie's Thornhurst Addition in Carmel, Indiana. Shull also designed a number of custom homes in Indianapolis' suburbs, in other Indiana towns, and in other states. In the 1970s Shull began selling house plans in do-it-yourself home building periodicals, which were sold in the United States and Canada. Shull also designed apartment buildings and commercial/industrial properties. Her first major project outside of Indiana was a public library in Elkins, West Virginia. She also designed restaurants, including one in California and one in Carmel, Indiana.

Born Avriel Joy Christie in Hamilton County, Indiana, she graduated from Carmel High School and attended Butler University and the John Herron School of Art in Indianapolis, Indiana. She left school before completing her degree in 1948 to launch her own commercial art business. In 1951 she married Richard K. Shull, an Indianapolis journalist who became a syndicated columnist and television critic. The couple had two daughters.

Shull is known for designing various homes in the Thornhurst Addition in Carmel, Indiana.

Shull died in 1976 of complications from diabetes. Christie's Thornhurst Addition was listed on the National Register of Historic Places in 2010 for its mid-century modern architecture and as the work of a master builder. Ladywood Estates was subsequently added to the National Register of Historic Places in 2019. The Avriel Shull architectural collection is housed at the Indiana Historical Society. Shull was a member of the National Association of Home Builders and the Builders Association of Greater Indianapolis.

== Youth and education ==
Born on February 9, 1931, Avriel Joy Christie was the daughter of Donald E. and Genevieve Christie of Carmel, Hamilton County, Indiana. At a young age, she became especially interested in clothing and interior design. After graduating from Carmel High School, she attended Butler University and the John Herron School of Art in Indianapolis, Indiana. She left school without earning a college degree and started her own commercial art business, Avriel Art Associates, in Indianapolis in 1948. Within a few years, she had switched to architectural design.

== Career ==
Following her marriage to Indianapolis newspaperman Richard K. Shull in 1951, she shifted her focus to building design and construction projects. Even though she lacked formal architectural training, Shull launched Avriel, her architectural design and construction firm in Carmel, Indiana, and specialized in modern-style home designs. Shull was a self taught architect. By 1954 she had designed and supervised the construction of her first home, a project that launched her career as an architectural designer and builder. The "Golden Unicorn", a modern-style home in Carmel, was named after the unicorn installed on an exterior wall.

Shull's first large-scale construction project was a suburban development on her parents' property, just west of what is now downtown Carmel, Indiana.In 1955 Shull's parents signed a certificate of survey for the first section of a new subdivision named Christie's Thornhurst Addition, unusual for its large concentration of Shull's strikingly-designed homes. Most post-World War II homes, especially in more conservative areas such as central Indiana, were revival-style or simple ranch homes. To attract homebuyers to Thornhurst, especially the growing number of U.S. military veterans and their families who were eligible for low-interest loans under the G.I. Bill, Shull designed modern homes to fit Federal Housing Administration guidelines. The FHA approved Shull's plans for the first three home designs for Thornhurst, which made them eligible for FHA financing.

In addition to the design work, Shull supervised construction, laying stone on many of the homes' exteriors herself; coordinated interior design; and assisted in furniture selection. Between 1956 and 1971 Shull designed and built twenty-one houses in Thornhurst. In 1957 the original plat was revised with a second addition. Shull contrasted with other Indianapolis architects such as Evans Woolen with her additions at Thornhurst. The project helped establish Avriel as a brand that represented modern architectural style. Soon, Shull began to expand her client list and portfolio with other projects.

While Shull's focus on modern-style homes set her apart from other designer/builders, she was certainly not alone. Notable architects such as Ludwig Mies van der Rohe and Joseph Eichler lead the way, influencing the work of others. Shull's designs shared some similarities with Eichler's California Contemporary homes: post-and-beam construction, which allowed for expansive, floor-to-ceiling windows and sliding glass doors; vertical siding; and decorative escutcheon plates on exterior doors. Shull's concept for a modern home design combined streamlined interiors with casual living spaces outdoors. Her interior sketches showed modern, informal living areas with easy-to-maintain furnishings.

Shull designed a few commercial and industrial properties, but most of her projects were single-family homes. In the 1960s and early 1970s, Shull-designed custom homes could be found in subdivisions around Hamilton and Marion counties, especially in upscale Indianapolis and Carmel suburban developments such as Springmill Estates, Williams Creek Heights, Somerset Hills, Devon Woods, Meridian Hills, Village Farms, Eden Estates and Williston Green. As Shull's reputation increased, so did the number of custom-built homes in other Indiana towns, such as Evansville, South Bend, and Brownsburg, and in other states. In the 1970s Shull began selling home design plans through Hudson Home Publications and other do-it-yourself home building periodicals, which were sold in the U.S. and Canada.

Shull's apartment designs include Somerset Lakes at 73rd Street and Keystone Avenue and the Ladywood Estates apartment community at the intersection of Emerson Way and Ladywood Drive in Indianapolis. Indianapolis attorney Frederick J. Capp hired her to design the Ladywood Estates complex in 1965. Shull's mid-century modern design for this project included post-and-beam construction, expansive panels of windows, stone masonry, and varied roof shapes.

Shull's other notable designs for commercial and industrial buildings the REA Terminal at English Avenue in Indianapolis and the Keystone Square Shopping Center in Carmel. She also designed the Woodland Springs Christian Church and the Woodland Springs Clubhouse in Carmel. Her first major project outside of Indiana was a design for the Elkins Public Library, in Elkins, West Virginia. She also did designs for restaurants, including the Totem Pole Restaurant in Carmel and one in San Bernardino, California.

== Marriage and family ==
On April 7, 1951, she married Richard K. Shull, an Indianapolis Times columnist. Richard Shull, who became Indianapolis's first TV critic, worked for the Indianapolis Times and later, the Indianapolis News. His syndicated column, "Shull's Mailbag", ran in 260 newspapers. He was inducted into the Indiana Journalism Hall of Fame in 2005 and died in 2007. The couple, known to friends as "Ave and Arky", had two daughters, Bambi (1960) and September (1966). Shull ran her design and construction business out of the home she designed for her family on a 40-acre tract of land north of Carmel. She died on March 6, 1976, of complications from diabetes. Shull was a Christian Scientist; a member of the Fifth Church of Christ, Scientist.

== Contributions ==
Shull left behind a number of modern-style homes. The Thornhurst Addition, which includes twenty-one of her designs, was listed on the National Register of Historic Places in 2010 and is noted for its mid-century modern architecture and the work of a master builder. Ladywood Estates was subsequently added to the National Register of Historic Places in 2019. Shull was a member of the National Association of Home Builders and the Builders Association of Greater Indianapolis. For more than twenty years, Shull designed and built modern single-family homes, apartment complexes, churches, shopping centers, libraries, and other commercial and industrial buildings that challenged traditional styles.

== Death ==
Shull died in 1976 of complications from diabetes.
