= David Brown House =

Historical building in Rising Sun, Indiana

Coordinates: 38°59′17.1″N 84°51′05.3″W

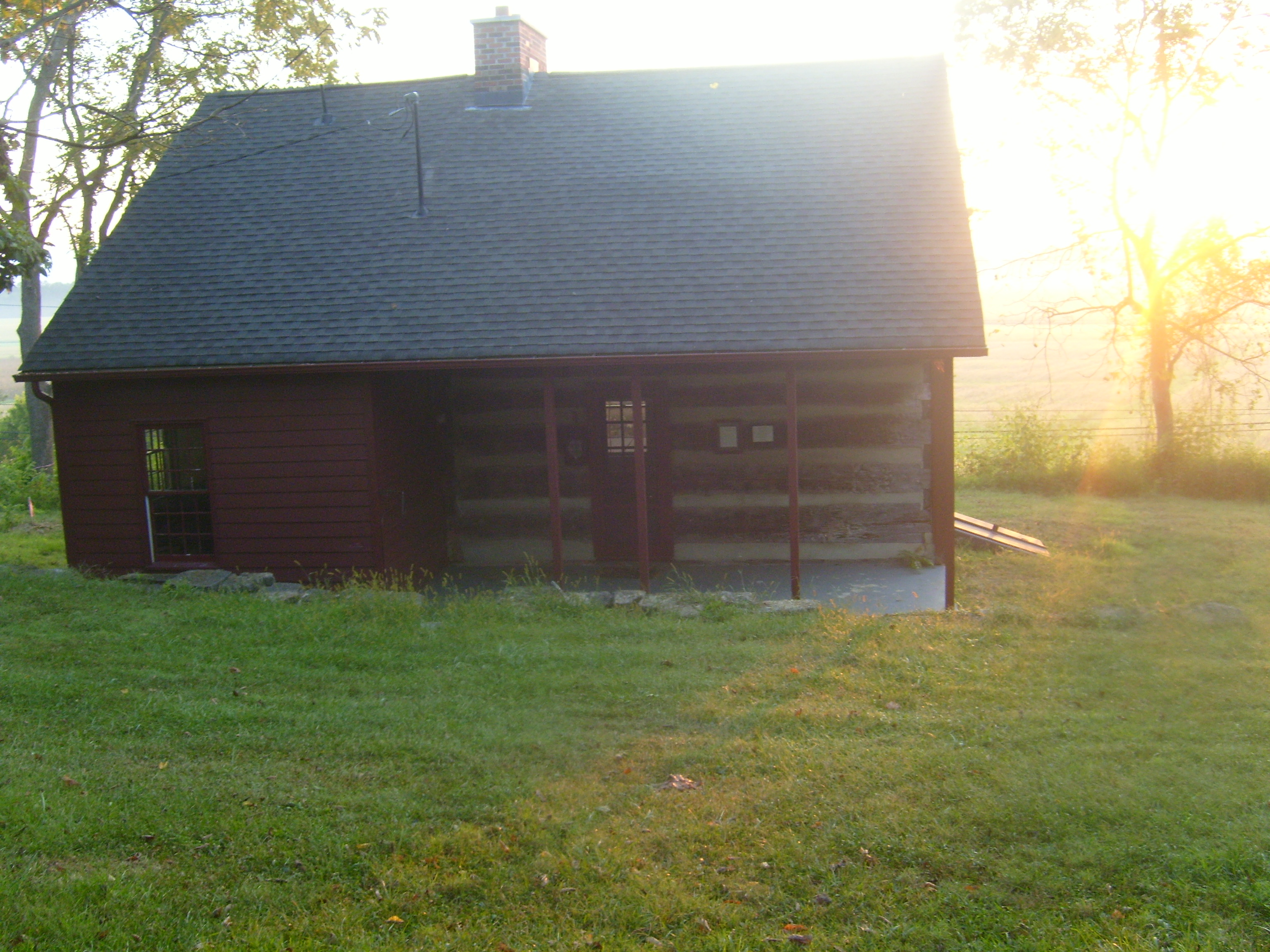
- West Facade

- Location within Indiana
- Location: Ohio County, Indiana

History
- Built: c.1825

Indiana Register of Historic Sites
- Designated: October 25, 1978

The David Brown House (constructed circa 1825) is located 4 miles (6.4 km) north of Rising Sun, Indiana and approximately 3 miles (4.8 km) south of Laughery Creek. The log home was placed on the Indiana Register of Historic Sites and Structures on October 25, 1978.

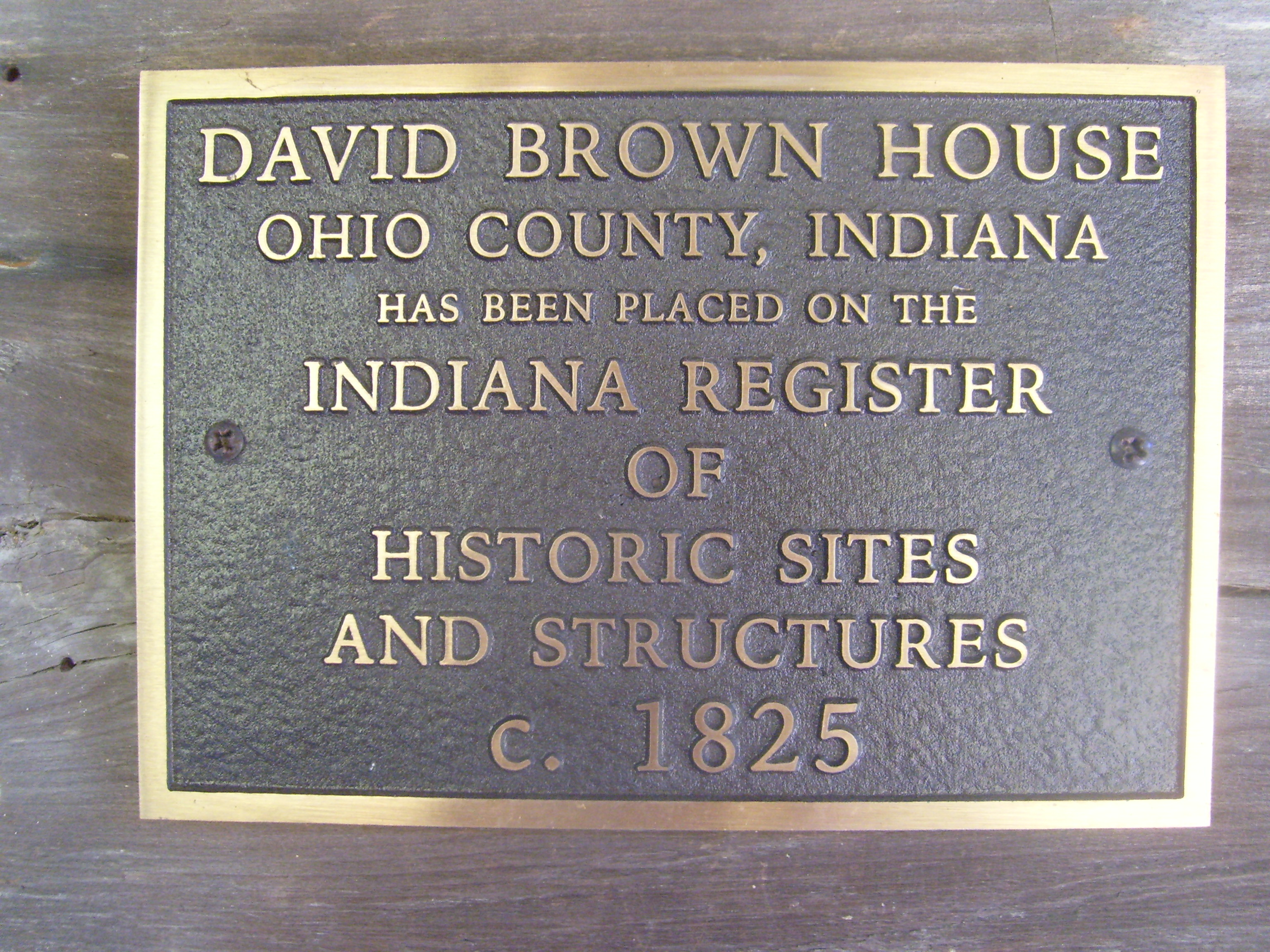
Historical Marker

This is an example of a pioneer Indiana home, a two-story log house on a bluff overlooking the Ohio River just west of Laughery Island. It was built in the block-house end method of log construction, from yellow poplar logs (average height 18", average thickness 10"). The logs are hand hewn on the inner and outer surfaces and the bark is intact on top and bottom. The space between the logs was chinked with log chips and stones for filler held in place by a daubing of lime mortar. When the home was rediscovered in 1971, most of the daubing was lost due to age and the shrinkage of the logs.

Originally this home was two rooms, one on top of another, 17' by 20', with a full field stone cellar below. The interior consisted of a stairway to the south, opposite the chimney, on the north side of the interior. Since "by 1800 iron foundries in the Ohio Valley were capable of casting stoves", this allowed for a chimney to be held within the structure. Additionally, there were two movable glazed sash windows in each room on the east side and two doors: one facing the river to the east and one opening to the west (or rear) of the home.

According to oral histories of the 19th century, the log house was altered. A shed kitchen was added to the rear (west side) of the house, later a four-room two-story addition was added to the north side, with door openings cut from the original structure on the first and second floors. At some point, clapboard siding was added to the exterior giving the home a typical frame farm house look.

Abandoned in the early 1900s, the house was rediscovered in 1971 (after the construction of an adjacent home). It was totally vine covered and dilapidated. Early thoughts were to raze the structure. The exterior siding was intact with the exception of a few clapboards on the eastern side of the home; it was then that the existence of the log structure was discovered. At that point restoration began. The addition was removed and a new frame two-story addition measuring 12' by 30' was constructed.

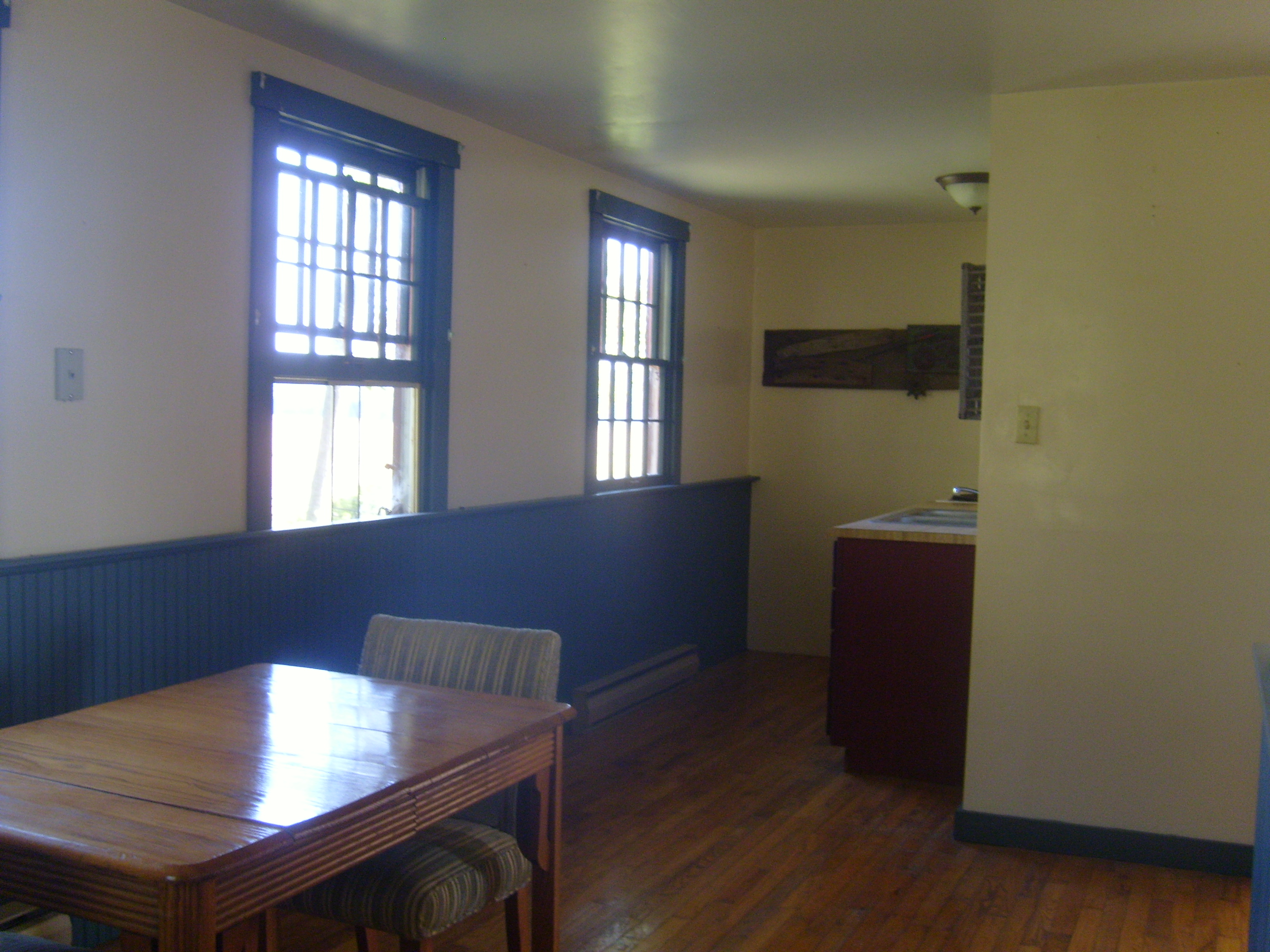
Addition that was rebuilt during renovation, modern kitchen added in 1971

This helped to maintain the original profile of the home. The new addition has modern conveniences which include a full bath and small but modern kitchen. Since these modern upgrades are contained in the addition, the original integrity of the home is unaltered.

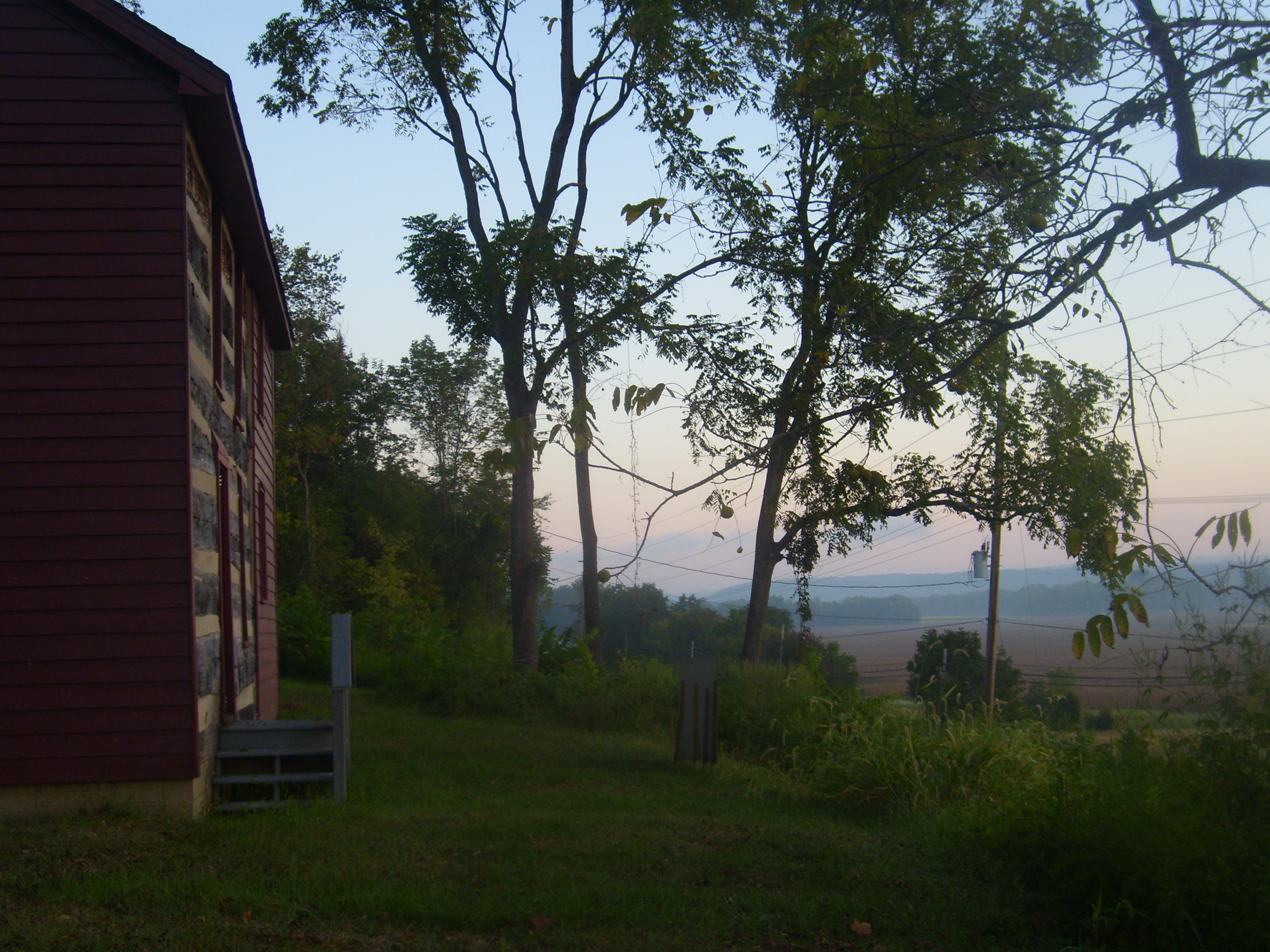
East facade picture taken looking north, toward Aurora, IN

The David Brown House is one of few log structures in the vicinity and is believed to be the oldest existing example of pioneer architecture in Ohio County, Indiana. It is associated with a prominent pioneer family giving it major significance to the history of Ohio County. Ethan Allen Brown purchased several thousand acres of land surrounding the Rising Sun region in 1802. His father and brothers emigrated to the area over the next 12 years. Ethan sold the property to David Brown (Ethan's older brother) in 1820. David, a lieutenant and Revolutionary War veteran, had a hand in building the home.

The property was inherited by David's only surviving child, Caroline Brown Moore, wife of Archibald Moore. Archibald is one of the "venerable pioneers of Rising Sun who is chiefly instrumental in giving prosperity and character to the town; and who took deep interest in founding and fostering schools and laying foundations of steady and solid growth to the place."

There is slight risk to the structure if the Federal Highway Commission chooses to widen State Road 56 in Indiana.

The structure is privately owned by the Halcomb Family of Aurora, Indiana and is not open to the public.

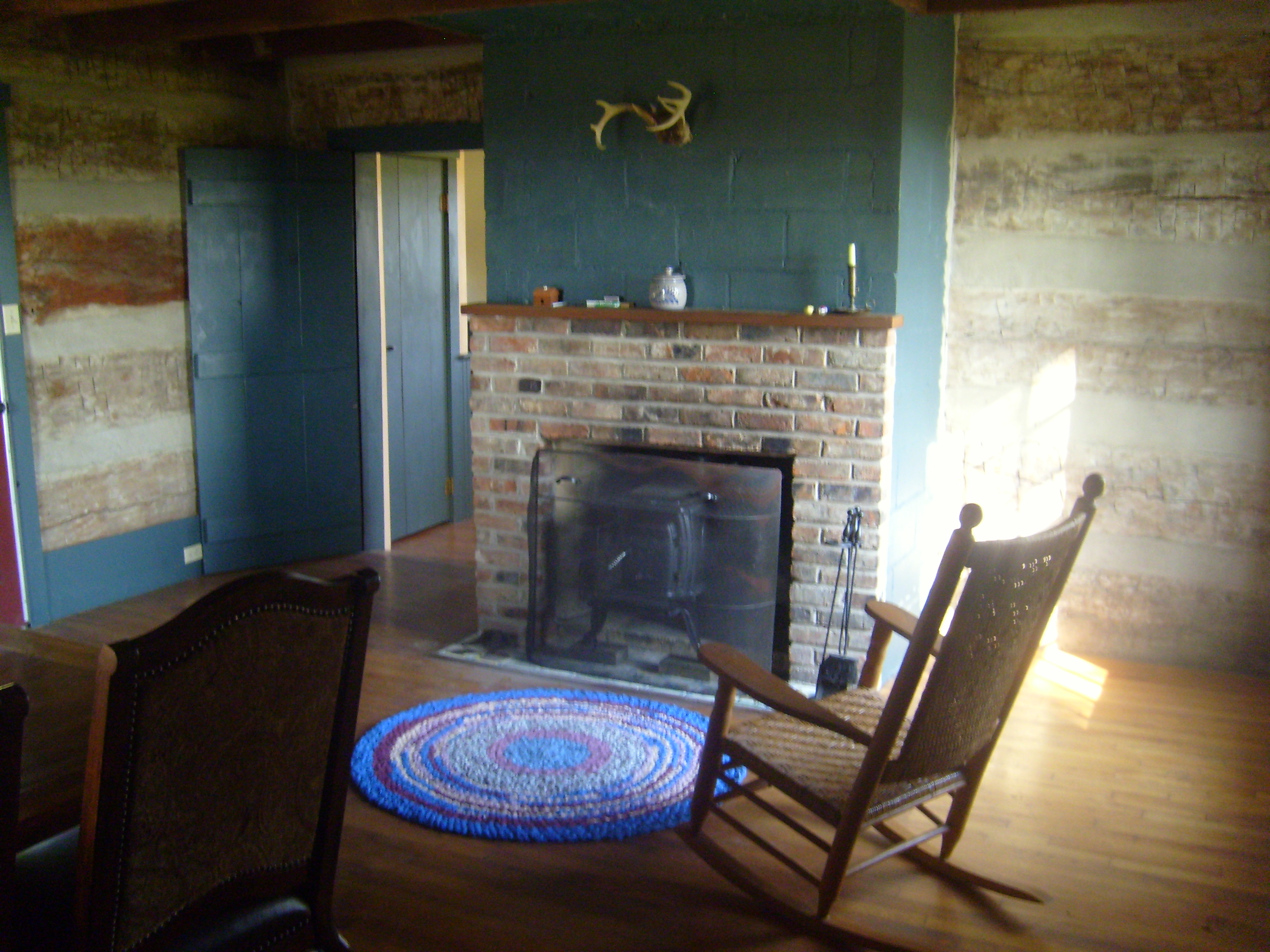
Living room fireplace added during renovation 1971, original was beyond repair

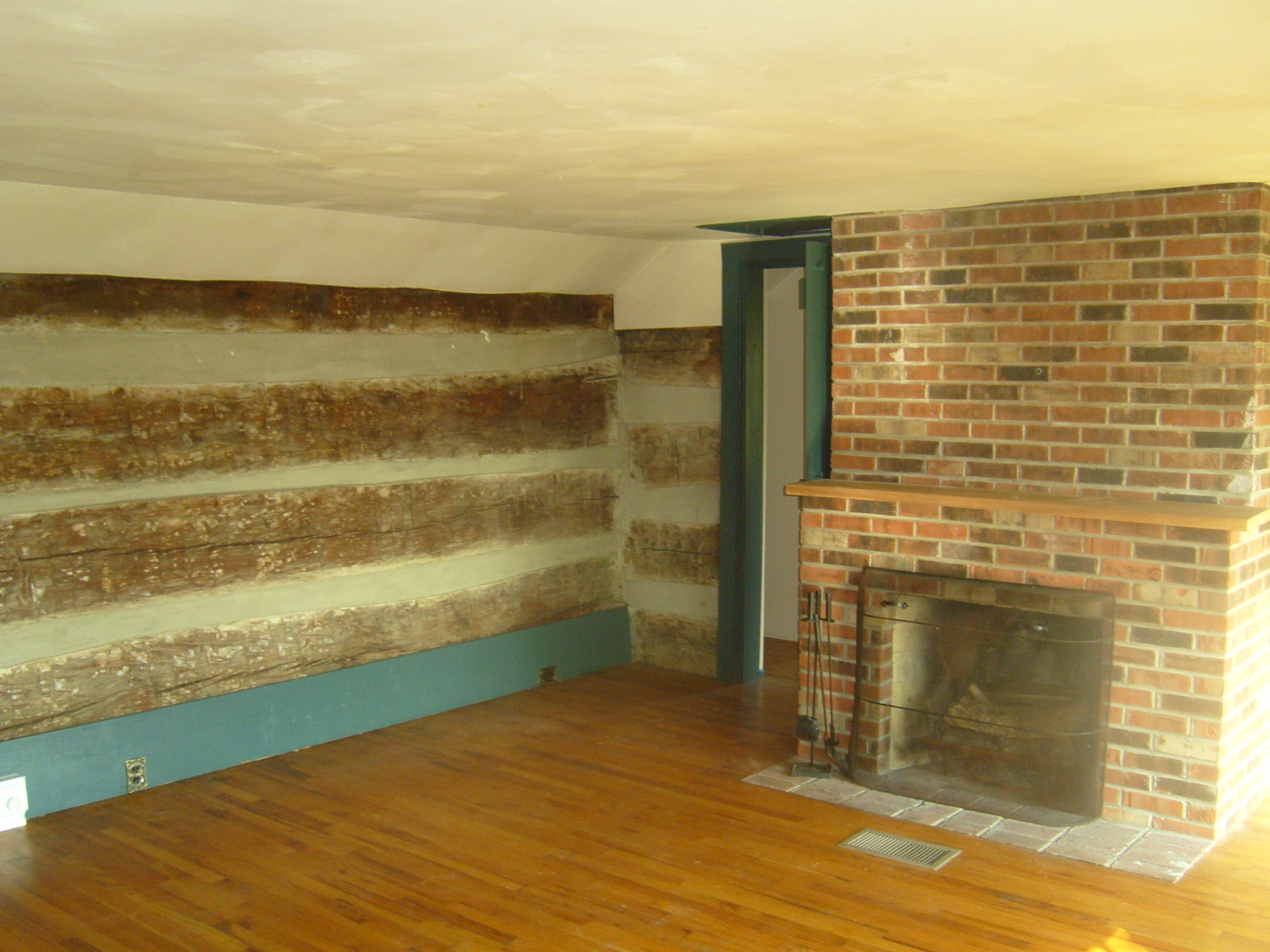
Original upstairs bedroom, fireplace added in renovation
