= Thornhurst Addition =

- U.S. National Register of Historic Places
- U.S. Historic district
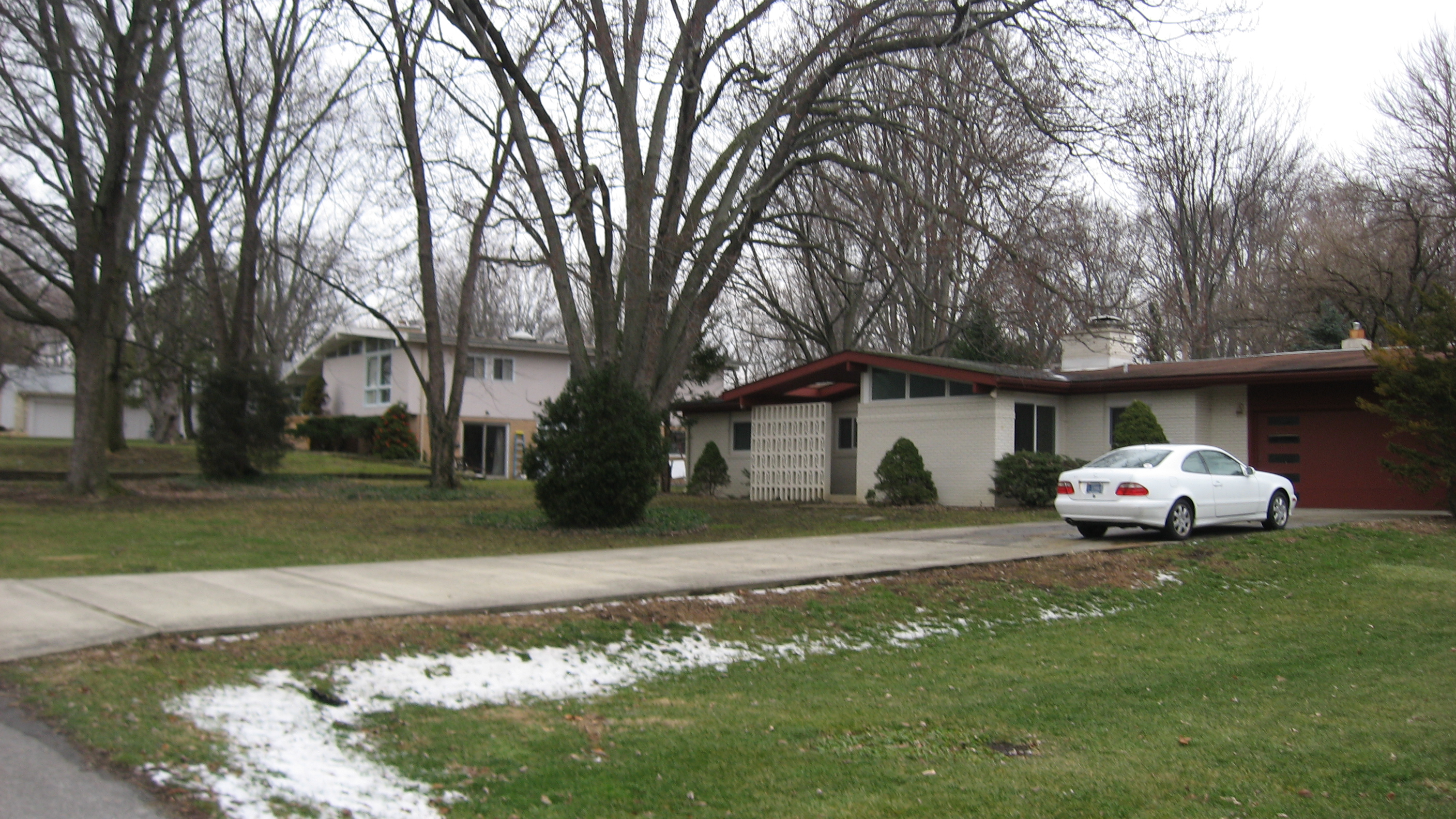
- Thornhurst Addition, January 2012

- Location within Indiana Location within the United States
- Location: Bounded by 650 to 742 W Main St, Thornhurst Dr and Rogers Ct, Carmel, Indiana
- Coordinates: 39°58′44″N 86°08′16″W
- Area: 11 acres (4.5 ha)
- Built: 1956-1971
- Architect: Shull, Avriel
- Architectural style: Modern Movement
- MPS: Historic Residential Suburbs in the United States, 1830-1960 MPS
- NRHP reference No.: 10000378
- Added to NRHP: June 24, 2010

Thornhurst Addition is a national historic district located at Carmel, Indiana. It encompasses 21 contributing buildings and one contributing site in a predominantly residential section of Carmel. It developed between about 1956 and 1971, and includes notable examples of Modern Movement style architecture designed by Avriel Shull (1931–1976). It includes homes of post and beam construction with huge aluminium window expanses, slate or stone entry floors, and clerestory windows.

It was listed on the National Register of Historic Places in 2010.
