= Jason Padgett =

American artist (born 1970)

Jason D. Padgett
- Born: 1970 (age 55–56); Anchorage, Alaska, U.S.
- Education: Tacoma Community College
- Occupation: Artist
- Years active: 2002–present
- Spouse: Elena Padgett
- Website: jason-padgett.pixels.com

Jason D. Padgett (born 1970) is an American artist diagnosed with acquired savant syndrome. As a young man, he dropped out of Tacoma Community College and worked as a salesman for his father's futon company. On the night of September 13, 2002, Padgett was attacked and robbed by two men outside a karaoke bar, an event that is purported to have changed his brain activity.

== Early life ==
Padgett was born in 1970 in Anchorage, Alaska, where he grew up. When he was nine years old, his parents divorced and Padgett moved with his mother and brother to the small town of Cantwell, Alaska. As a young man, he bungee jumped at least 30 times, skydived nineteen times, scuba dived with sharks, and earned a brown belt in karate. He soon dropped out of community college to sell futons full time.

== Attack ==
On September 13, 2002, Padgett went to a local karaoke bar with his friends in Tacoma, Washington. As he was leaving the karaoke bar, he was hit on the back of the head. He saw a white light, felt dizzy, fell down, and lost consciousness. As he came to and tried to stand up, he was punched and kicked by two men repeatedly.

At the Tacoma General Hospital, doctors diagnosed a bruised kidney and a concussion; Padgett was given medication and was sent home the same night. His alleged attackers were arrested and then released.

== Aftermath ==
After the attack, Padgett experienced post-traumatic stress disorder and debilitating social anxiety, as well as a change in his vision, which he described as "discrete picture frames with a line connecting them, but still at real speed," akin to being able to perceive the individual frames of a film. In addition, he described images perceived by his eyes and brain as having "a pixelated look." He assumed it was an effect of the medication he was prescribed; but it was later found that, because of his traumatic brain injury, Padgett had signs of obsessive–compulsive disorder and post-traumatic stress disorder. He also began viewing the world through a figurative lens of mathematical shapes.

The onset of OCD and PTSD happened immediately. He was engaged in obsessive–compulsive behaviors, such as avoiding germs. He would wash his hands 20 times in 30 minutes, trying to avoid touching something in the process that might be dirty. He avoided people by only leaving his home at night for food and hammering three layers of blankets over his windows to avoid sunlight. He would sleep for days and, on waking, try to go back to sleep. His personality had rapidly undergone a major shift.

=== Acquired savant syndrome ===
Immediately after the attack, Padgett said that he began seeing the world through a mathematical lens. He began sketching circles made of overlapping triangles, which helped him understand the concept of pi. These drawings helped him manage his OCD and PTSD. He contacted Wisconsin psychiatrist Dr. Darold Treffert, a world-recognized expert on savantism who eventually diagnosed Padgett with acquired savant syndrome. According to the New York Post, "Padgett is one of only 40 people in the world with "acquired savant syndrome", a condition in which prodigious talents in math, art or music emerge in previously normal individuals following a brain injury or disease."

Padgett continued drawing and returned to school where he met his now wife, Elena Padgett.

Padgett came to view the attack and its effects as a gift. Since the attack, he began selling his artwork on his website, wrote a book about the attack and the way it changed his life, and has given TEDx talks. Sony Pictures picked up the rights to make a movie about his life.

Fifteen years after the attack, one of Padgett's attackers, Brady Simmons, reached out and apologized to Padgett for the incident, which Padgett accepted.

In 2021, Padgett and his family moved to Carmel, Indiana after he wrote a program to determine a place to live.
