= Ladywood Estates =

- U.S. National Register of Historic Places
- U.S. Historic district
- Location within Indianapolis Location within Indiana Location within the United States
- Location: Roughly bounded by the 5200 blk. of Emerson Way, Ladywood Dr. & the hill west of Nob Ln., Indianapolis, Indiana
- Coordinates: 39°50′55″N 86°5′11″W
- Area: approx. 10 acres (4.0 ha)
- Built: 1967
- Architect: Avriel Shull
- Architectural style: Mid-century modern
- NRHP reference No.: 100004728
- Added to NRHP: December 2, 2019

Ladywood Estates is a historic district in Indianapolis, Indiana. Built in 1967, it consists of 14 contributing multi-family residential buildings, 16 contributing garage buildings, and one contributing object. Originally planned as apartments, the residential buildings vary in size and number of units. All structures maintain a mid-century modern design relating to the community's post-war era development. The buildings are limestone, brick, and wood siding, with post-and-beam construction typical of mid-century modern open design.

The community was planned by lawyer and developer Fredrick J. Capp, who purchased the land in 1965. Capp employed architectural designer Avriel Shull to design it.

It was listed as a historic district on the National Register of Historic Places in 2019.

== See also ==
- National Register of Historic Places listings in Marion County, Indiana
