= Carmel High School (Indiana) =

Public high school in Carmel, Indiana, United States

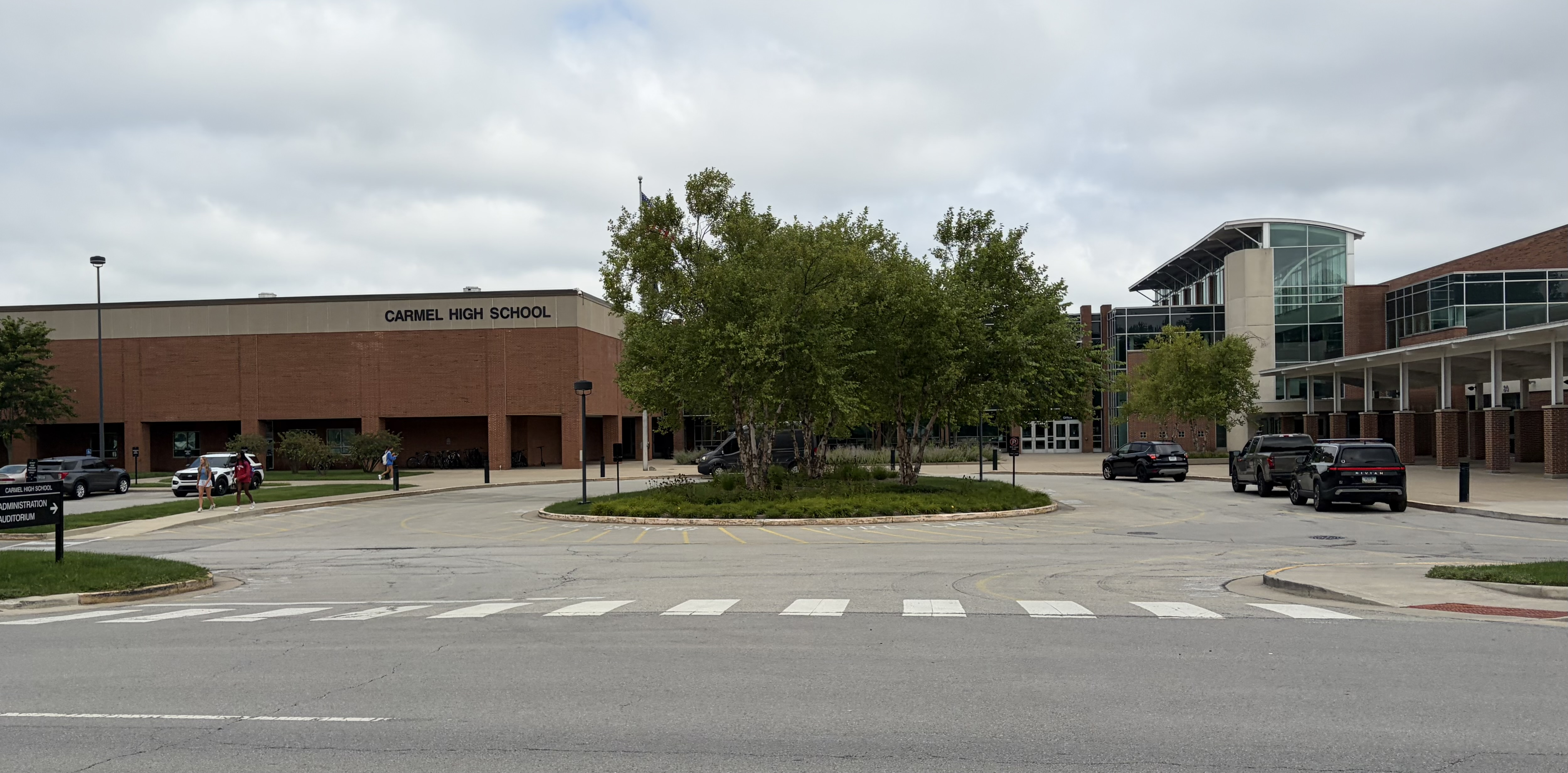
- Carmel High School in 2026

Location
- 520 East Main Street; Carmel, Indiana 46032; United States; 39°58′45″N 86°7′10″W

Information
- Type: Public high school
- Established: 1869
- School district: Carmel Clay Schools
- Principal: Tim Phares
- Teaching staff: 308.55 (on an FTE basis)
- Grades: 9–12
- Enrollment: 5,200 (2023–2024)
  - Grade 9: 1280
  - Grade 10: 1271
  - Grade 11: 1321
  - Grade 12: 1328
- Student to teacher ratio: 16.85
- Colors: Blue and gold
- Athletics conference: Independent
- Nickname: Greyhounds
- Rival: North Central High School (Indianapolis)
- Newspaper: HiLite Newsmagazine
- Yearbook: Pinnacle
- Website: www.ccs.k12.in.us/chs

Carmel High School (CHS) is a public high school in Carmel, Indiana, United States. It is part of the Carmel Clay School District and is the institution of its kind in the state, with over 5,100 students enrolled.

The school district boundary includes almost all of Carmel.

== Demographics ==
The demographic breakdown of the 5,192 students enrolled for the 2023–2024 school year was:

- Male – 49.8%
- Female – 50.2%
- Native American/Alaskan – 0.1%
- Asian – 16.8%
- Black – 4.3%
- Hispanic – 6.3%
- Native Hawaiian/Pacific islanders – 0.2%
- White – 68.1%
- Multiracial – 4.3%

13.2% of the students were eligible for free or reduced-price lunch. For the 2020–2021 school year, Carmel was a Title I school.

== Athletics ==
Carmel's teams, the Greyhounds, are part of the Metropolitan Interscholastic Conference. The school colors are blue and gold.

As of the 2025–2026 school year, the following varsity sports were offered:

- Baseball (boys)
- Basketball (girls and boys)
- Competition Cheerleading
- Cross country (girls and boys)
- Dance Team
- eSports (coed)
- Football (boys)
- Lacrosse (girls and boys)
- Golf (girls and boys)
- Soccer (girls and boys)
- Softball (girls)
- Swimming and diving (girls and boys)
- Tennis (girls and boys)
- Track and Field (girls and boys)
- Unified flag football (coed)
- Unified Track and Field (coed)
- Volleyball (girls and boys)
- Wrestling (boys and girls)

== Athletic state championships ==
As of June 2026, Carmel has 186 IHSAA state championships, the most of any school. They have the IHSAA record for most state titles in the same academic year, with seven in 2011–2012, 2016–2017, 2018–2019, and 2020–2021. They also have both the IHSAA and national record for most consecutive state championships in any sport by winning the Indiana Girl's Swimming & Diving State Championships 39 times from 1987 to 2025. At the 2023 IHSAA Boys Swimming & Diving State Championships, the Greyhounds broke the NFHS record in the 200 medley relay with a time of 1:26.88.

Sport	Year(s)
IHSAA sanctioned sports
Boys' basketball (5)	1977, 2012, 2013, 2019, 2021
Girls' basketball (1)	2008
Boys' cross country (18)	1976, 1977, 1978, 1979, 1981, 1982, 1987, 1988, 1993, 1996, 2008, 2012, 2013, 2015, 2017, 2018, 2022, 2023
Girls' cross country (21)	1982, 1984, 1985, 1986, 1987, 1988, 1995, 1996, 1997, 2001, 2008, 2010, 2011, 2012, 2013, 2014, 2015, 2016, 2020, 2024, 2025
Football (9)	1978, 1980, 1981, 1986, 1989, 2007, 2011, 2016, 2019
Boys' golf (7)	1970, 1971, 1982, 1989, 1990, 2018, 2019
Girls' golf (4)	1980, 2013, 2022, 2023
Boys' soccer (2)	2006, 2025
Girls' soccer (10)	1994, 1995, 1997, 2000, 2001, 2002, 2003, 2004, 2011, 2018
Softball (2)	1994, 2011
Boys' swimming (26)	1990, 1991, 1992, 1993, 1994, 1996, 1997, 2001, 2002, 2003, 2004, 2010, 2011, 2012, 2015, 2016, 2017, 2018, 2019, 2020, 2021, 2022, 2023, 2024, 2025
Girls' swimming (41)	1982, 1987, 1988, 1989, 1990, 1991, 1992, 1993, 1994, 1995, 1996, 1997, 1998, 1999, 2000, 2001, 2002, 2003, 2004, 2005, 2006, 2007, 2008, 2009, 2010, 2011, 2012, 2013, 2014, 2015, 2016, 2017, 2018, 2019, 2020, 2021, 2022, 2023, 2024, 2025
Boys' tennis (16)	1980, 1981, 1987, 2003, 2004, 2010, 2011, 2012, 2016, 2017, 2018, 2019, 2020, 2021, 2023, 2025
Girls' tennis (13)	1989, 1990, 2003, 2009, 2011, 2013, 2014, 2015, 2017, 2018, 2021, 2022, 2023
Boys' track (5)	2000, 2015, 2016, 2017, 2021
Girls' track (4)	1998, 1999, 2025, 2026
Unified Flag Football (1)	2023
Volleyball (1)	2014
Other sports
Competitive cheer (4)	2000, 2005, 2006, 2017(Co-Ed)
Boys' lacrosse (5)	2011, 2012, 2014, 2015, 2023
Girls' lacrosse (5)	2011, 2012, 2014, 2018, 2019, 2021, 2024, 2025

== Arts ==
The Carmel High School marching band were Indiana State Fair Band Day champions in 1984 and ISSMA State Champions in 1990, 2001, 2002, 2012, 2018, and 2022. The band was named a BOA National Class AAA Champion in 2001, and BOA Grand National Champion in 2005, 2012, 2016, 2017, 2018, 2022, and 2023.

In 2007, the marching band was named Bands of America Regional Champion in Indianapolis and Atlanta, Georgia.

At the 2008 BOA Grand National Finals, the marching band won the caption for best music. Later, the marching band was selected to play in the 2011 and 2022 Macy's Thanksgiving Day Parade.

The band has also received an invitation to play in the 2014 and 2027 Tournament of Roses Parade in Pasadena, California.

In 2016, the Carmel High School Marching Band set a record as the first group to ever tie for first place at the Bands of America Grand National Championships with a score of 97.45. Carmel won the tiebreaker over Avon High School (Indiana) and was crowned Grand National Champion. In 1999, 2013, 2015, 2017, 2018, and 2022, Carmel won the Indiana State School Music Association State Championship.

The band has appeared in Bands of America Grand National finals for over 25 consecutive years, and has won the national title seven times, in 2005, 2012, 2016, 2017, 2018, 2022 and 2023.

== Journalism ==
The Pinnacle yearbook has received recognition from the Columbia Scholastic Press Association, National Scholastic Press Association, and the Indiana High School Press Association. The publication has received the Gold Crown award and Indiana Hoosier Star Awards and has been included in the Walsworth Publishing Company's Gallery of Excellence. It operates an independent website.

The school newspaper, the HiLite, has received national recognition, including a "Superior" rating from Quill & Scroll, the Hoosier Star award, and other general awards from the Indiana High School Press Association, Columbia Scholastic Press Association (CSPA), as well as several individual awards for HiLite staff members. The HiLite was a gold medalist in the CSPA's annual critique, won a George H. Gallup Award from Quill and Scroll, and has been nominated to be a CSPA Crown finalist for the 2011–2012 publications. The newspaper maintains a staff of about 80 students.

The school operates the WHJE radio station on 91.3 MHz on the FM band. In 1999, WIRE, a local station that broadcasts on 91.5 MHz, proposed moving its broadcasting antenna closer to the school. When the school filed an FCC petition in opposition to the proposed antenna move, WIRE filed a response alleging that WHJE broadcasts music with indecent lyrics.

The school television station, CHTV, operates on Channel 99 on cable television. Their variety of work has received multiple accolades, such as Intercollegiate Broadcasting System Awards, primarily for their student-produced newscasts, sports broadcasts, and other student-produced reports. Statewide, the station receives general distinction from the Indiana Association of School Broadcasters each year, and in 2023, it was named the Emerging Media School of the Year. The station's staff maintains a YouTube channel with over 3,500 subscribers.

== History ==
Carmel High School began as Richland School in a Quaker meeting house in 1833 and received its first designated structure a few years later. In 1845, a frame school building was built near the same site. In 1867, the all-brick Carmel Academy was built on land where the Wesleyana Amistad Cristiana Church sits today. On September 23, 1887, on a small hill on the east side of First Avenue SE and Fifth Street SE, the cornerstone of the first Carmel High School was laid. The two-story brick building schooled grades one through ten. Because the town was founded on a boundary separating Clay and Delaware townships, the school was administered jointly by trustees of both. This new Carmel High School was opened in 1888 with its first graduating class in 1890. The first class to receive four years of education graduated in 1901.

In 1921, land was purchased on the east side of Carmel proper, and a new school was designed to house grades one through twelve. This facility would contain a gymnasium, a library, and a 600-seat auditorium. In 1955 Forest Stoops, the county superintendent, was hired, and the state legislature was persuaded to move the township boundary east to White River. Carmel Clay Schools began in 1956. By 1958, Carmel High School was opened at its present location. An addition was added to the gymnasium in 1961, and a large addition including a swimming pool, an auditorium, and new classrooms opened in 1969. A third, freestanding addition was opened in 1977, located between the 1921 building (affectionately known as Old North) and the new Carmel High School. A final construction project was begun in 1990 and dedicated in April 1999. In 2006, the CHS Freshman Center was opened. In 2014, students and alumni involved with the DECA program opened the Carmel Café & Market. Today, Carmel High School sits on 55 acres of land, and 22 are under roof.

== Viral TikTok ==
External videos
- Two TikToks by the school's DECA team showcasing a tour of the school
- via TikTok
- Take a tour of the school where champions are made!! (February 8, 2023)
- Did someone say part 2? (February 9, 2023)

On February 8, 2023, the school's DECA team posted a TikTok featuring a tour of the campus, which was followed by a part two the next day on February 9. The videos, which showcased various amenities at the school, including an on-campus bookstore, an auto shop, an Esports room, a jewelry room, a 10,000 seat football stadium, a market, radio, and planetarium, amongst other features, received a combined total of 34 million views on TikTok and versions posted to Twitter.

The videos drew attention to the school's amenities. This sparked responses from alumni of other schools, particularly those from poorer areas and started a discussion regarding the United States' education system and spending in the system. The debate was inflamed by the racial demographics of the school, which is majority white, leading to many pointing to this being an issue of racial inequities. Critics decried the stark difference between Carmel High School and schools in poor-income areas, which was often blamed on the supposed greater funding towards schools like Carmel; this claim was disputed in the libertarian magazine Reason, which pointed out that Carmel spends less per pupil compared to public high schools in Indianapolis.

Tim Phares, CHS principal, claimed that the incident was an entertaining but educational experience, adding that "[W]e are excited they seemingly hit the jackpot with millions of people viewing the tour of our exceptional school. Like with much of social media, they have also witnessed some negativity and the experience has provided multiple lessons about being online." The comments on the video have since been disabled.

== Notable alumni ==
- Ted Allen, television personality and author known
- Jeffrey Anderson, tuba player and educator
- Rich Balchan, soccer player
- Nishesh Basavareddy, tennis player
- Nate Becker, college football player
- Amy Bilquist, competitive swimmer
- Cole Brevard, NFL player
- David Broecker, biotechnology businessman
- Mike Delph, politician and former member of the Indiana Senate
- Stu Douglass, former college basketball player
- Eric Dick, professional soccer goalie
- Keeley Dowling, professional soccer
- Matt Elliott, NFL player
- A. J. Hammons, college and professional basketball
- Haste the Day, Christian heavy metal band
- Matt Hedges, professional soccer player
- Shawn Heffern, former professional football player
- Will Heldt, college football
- Mark Herrmann, former football player
- Steve Inskeep, journalist and author
- Drew Kibler, competition swimmer
- Kevin Krauter, singer, songwriter, and musician
- Sarah Litzsinger, actress and singer
- Jake Lloyd, former child actor
- Kyle Lloyd, professional baseball
- Josh McRoberts, former NBA player
- Jake Mitchell, Olympic swimmer
- Morgan Newton, college football quarterback and tight end
- Tommy O'Haver, film and television director
- Rajeev Ram, professional tennis player
- Austin Roberts, former NFL tight end; played for the Los Angeles Chargers
- Rob Schmitt, television news anchor and commentator
- Alex Shackell, Olympic swimmer
- Aaron Shackell, Olympic swimmer
- Billy Shepherd, former basketball player
- Avriel Shull, architect
- Sage Steele, television anchor and sportscaster
- Peter Suder, NBA player
- Olaoluwatomi Taiwo, basketball player
- Danielle Trotta, sportscaster and television host
- Todd Young, United States senator from Indiana

== See also ==
- List of high schools in Indiana
