= James Brainard =

American politician (born 1954)

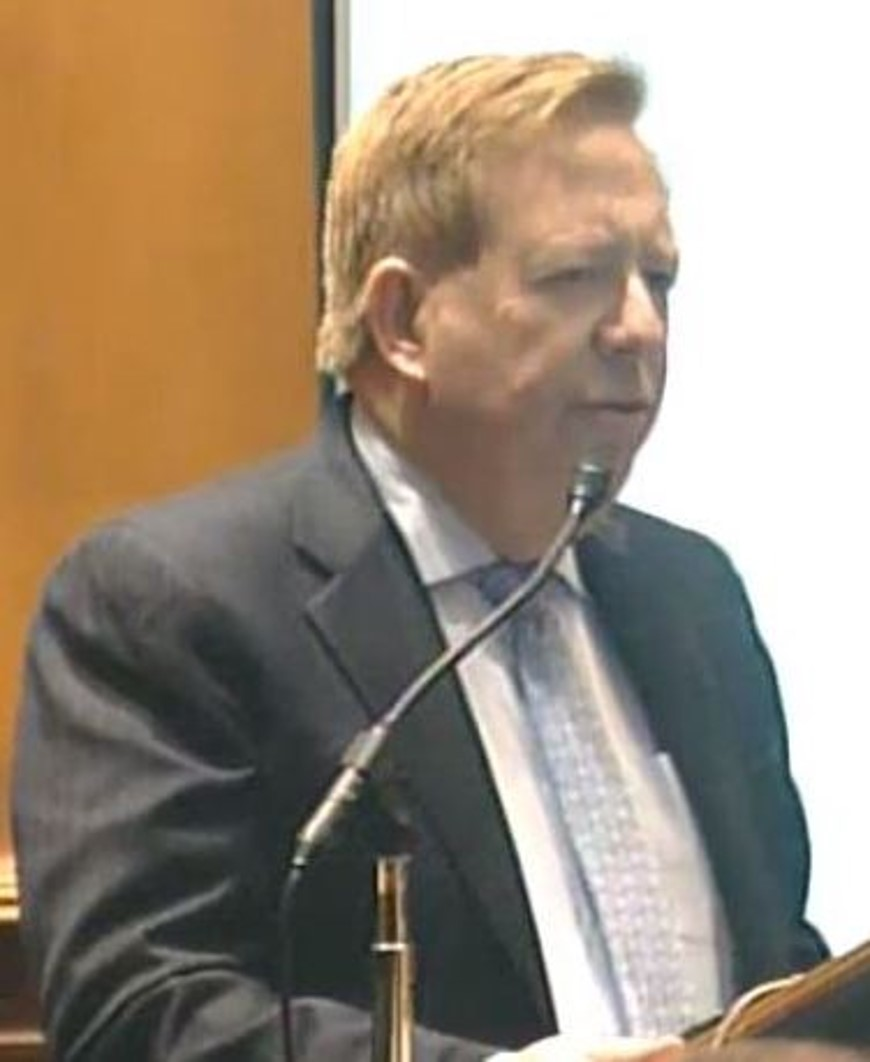

Mayor of Carmel, Indiana
- In office January 1, 1996 – January 1, 2024
- Preceded by: Ted Johnson
- Succeeded by: Sue Finkam

Personal details
- Born: June 8, 1954 (age 72) Manhattan, Kansas
- Party: Republican
- Education: Butler University (BA); Ohio Northern University (JD)
- Occupation: Lecturer; politician
- Website: Official website
- Nickname: Jim

James Brainard (born 1954) is a retired American politician of the Republican Party who served as the fifth mayor of Carmel, Indiana, a principal city in the Indianapolis metropolitan area, from 1996 to 2024. At the time he left office on January 1, 2024, he was one of Indiana's longest-serving mayors. During his tenure as mayor, Carmel's population grew from 25,000 in 1996 to 102,000 in 2021 and saw the creation of substantial downtown redevelopment. Brainard's term expired on January 1, 2024.

== Political views and career ==
=== Transportation policy ===
Under Brainard's administration, the City of Carmel eliminated dozens of traffic signals and dangerous intersections, replacing them with roundabouts. Carmel has more roundabouts than any other city in the United States. The policy has been credited with a reduction of carbon emissions, fatalities and intersection collisions.

=== Climate and energy ===
Brainard is described as a moderate Republican committed to fighting the effects of global warming. Brainard served as a Trustee and co-chair of the Energy Independence and Climate Protection Task Force for the U.S. Conference of Mayors. In November 2013, he was appointed to the Task Force on Climate Preparedness and Resilience by the President of the United States. In 2015, he traveled to four cities in India to represent the United States as part of the U.S. State Department's speaker's bureau. Also in 2015, he was asked to speak on energy and climate policy at the German-American Centers in five German cities. He has been a guest lecturer for Georgetown University, Butler University, Indiana University and Purdue University among others. Because of his views, Brainard was selected to be on President Obama's Task Force on Climate Preparedness and Resilience.

=== Fiscal and health policy ===
Because of Brainard's activity to create a health-conscious community, Carmel has received various awards for its healthy living.

Concerns have been raised in recent years about Brainard's handling of Carmel city finances. In 2015, the city overestimated tax revenues by more than $5 million and was forced to reallocate funds between accounts to meet then current obligations. In 2017, S&P downgraded Carmel's long-term bond rating from AA-plus to AA, noting a $300-million increase in debt over the prior 3 years. In its analysis, S&P noted: "In our view, this demonstrates the risk of high leverage and a heavy dependence on sometimes more volatile tax-increment revenues. We feel the city's crowded budget and high fixed costs leave it vulnerable to unanticipated economic or operational swings."

In response to a question about the Green New Deal, Brainard has said, "I think we have [to] find that middle ground where we can do things that encourage green jobs—do things that help the economy and reduce carbon at the same time."

=== Civil rights and diversity ===
In 2015, he proposed and the City Council passed a new ordinance designed to protect human rights regardless of race, religion, sexual orientation, or gender identity. The issue was first raised in Carmel during the election campaign and came to its closure during a time of heightened awareness. Brainard hosted an annual Iftar dinner for the local Muslim community and established a new Carmel Interfaith Alliance in the fall of 2015 designed to bring together pastors and religious leaders from a variety of faiths.

On June 1, 2020, in the wake of a nationwide increase in protests against police brutality and racism in policing, Brainard released a statement stating intent to sue the city of Minneapolis for alleged costs incurred in "increased security" as a result of said protests. The threat made national news, and Brainard publicly retracted the city's plan that evening.

=== Driving incidents ===
Brainard crashed city-leased vehicles several times during his tenure as mayor. In November 2002, he T-boned a school bus, which did not result in any injuries. In April 2017, he crossed the center line of a two-way road, striking a trailer being pulled behind a pick-up truck. In December 2018, Brainard was driving with movie producers filming at Carmel's Christkindlmarkt when he took a U-turn from the right lane. As his car moved into the left lane, Brainard struck the passenger side of a car traveling down the left lane.

== Awards ==
- 2023 Sagamore of the Wabash
- 2013 International Making Cities Livable Joseph P. Riley Jr. Award "for his inspirational leadership in creating a vibrant, multi-functional heart for Carmel, IN."
- 2012 American Council of Engineering Companies of Indiana (ACEC Indiana) Public Service Award
- 2011 Local Arts Leadership award for the "Support the Arts fund, which mandates that one percent of the city's general fund support local arts organizations."

== See also ==
- List of longest-serving United States mayors
