= Carmel Clay Public Library =

Public library in Carmel, Indiana

Coordinates: 39°58′39.5″N 86°07′18.4″W

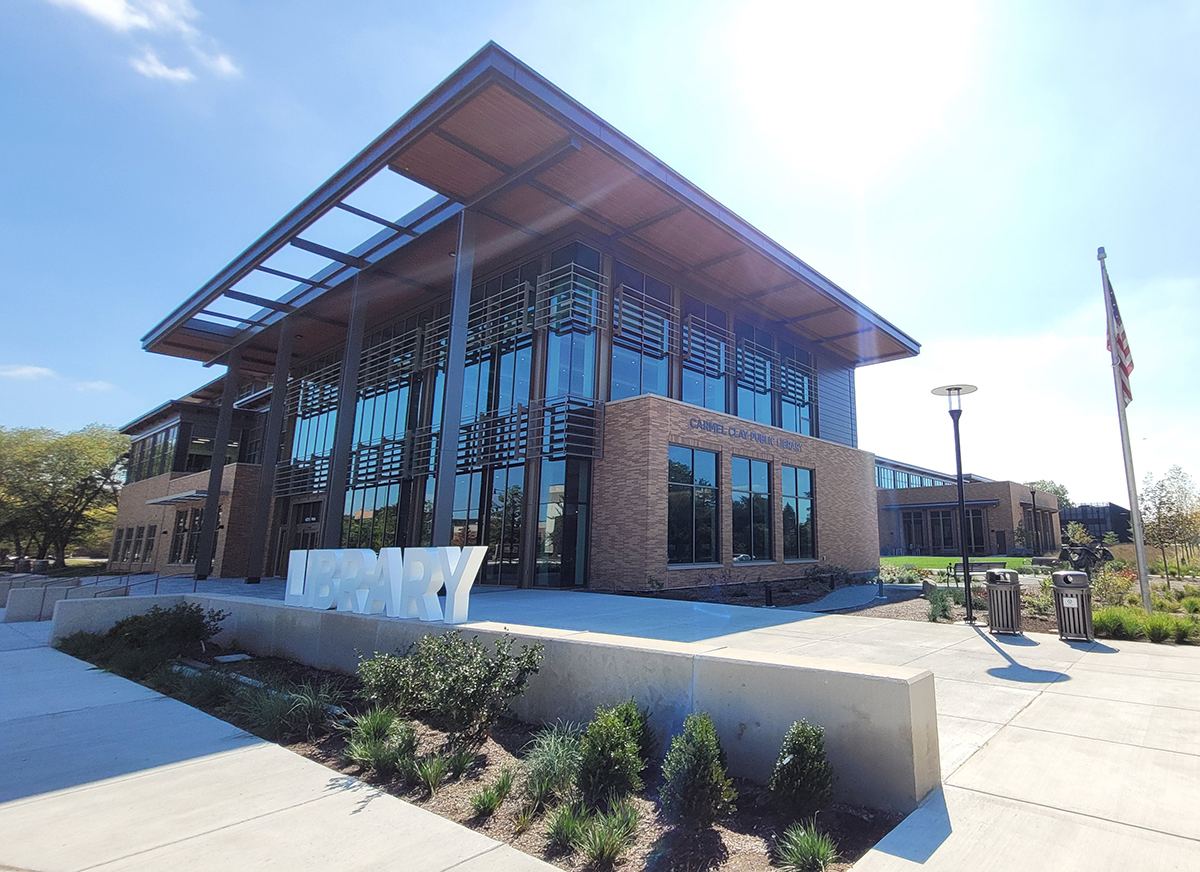
- Carmel Clay Public Library (2023)
- Location: 425 E. Main Street, Carmel, Indiana
- Established: 1904
- Branches: 2

Access and use
- Population served: 101,964 (2022 U.S. Census Population Estimate)

Other information
- Director: Bob Swanay
- Website: https://carmelclaylibrary.org

The Carmel Clay Public Library serves the community of Carmel, Indiana, offering materials to check out, public programs and events, technology, and spaces to meet and study. The library has two locations, the Main Library in central Carmel and the Joyce Winner West Branch in the Village of WestClay.

== Early history ==
The Carmel Library was unofficially created in 1896 by the Wednesday Literary Club, largely organized by a school teacher named Luther Haines. The library was officially founded in 1904 by a group of trustees. A grant of US$11,000 was given to the library on March 14, 1913, to expand the building by the Carnegie Corporation. The building was largely constructed between 1911 and 1914. The building was later transformed into a restaurant entitled "Woody's Library Restaurant," with books still present at the building. In 1972, the Carnegie library was replaced by a larger building. That facility was renovated in 1986, doubling its size, and was renamed Carmel Clay Public Library in reference to the city of Carmel and Clay Township.

== Modern history ==
The present 132,000 ft^{2} (12,300 m^{2}), two-story Main Library was constructed between 1997 and 1999. With the completion of a large-scale expansion and renovation project in 2022, the Main Library includes a Digital Media Lab, public meeting and study rooms, dedicated spaces for Youth Services and Teen Services, and an onsite coffee shop.

The library opened its first branch location, a 5,000 ft^{2} (460 m^{2}) facility in the Village of WestClay in 2020.

During the expansion and renovation, the library temporarily moved to a former Marsh Supermarkets building, storing some materials in the former refrigerators.
