= Carmel station =

Historic train station in Indiana, United States

- Carmel Monon Depot
- Formerly listed on the U.S. National Register of Historic Places
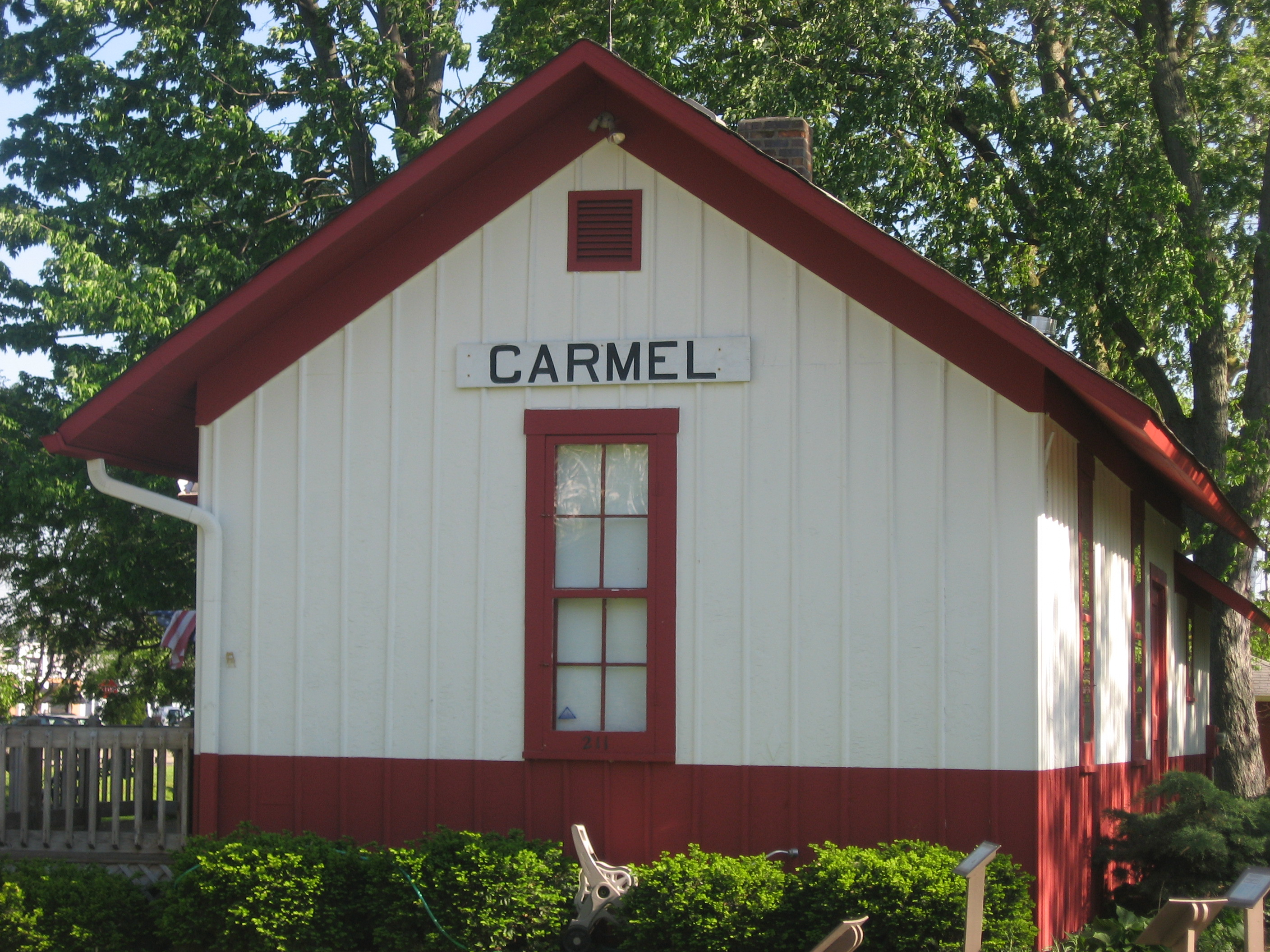
- Carmel Monon Depot, May 2013

- Location within Indiana Location within the United States
- Location: 211 1st St., SW., Carmel, Indiana
- Coordinates: 39°58′38″N 86°07′48″W
- Area: 0.23 acres (0.093 ha)
- Architectural style: Late Victorian
- NRHP reference No.: 13000420

Significant dates
- Added to NRHP: June 25, 2013
- Removed from NRHP: May 22, 2023

Carmel Monon Depot, also known as Monon Depot Museum, is a historic train station located at Carmel, Indiana. It was built in 1883 by the Monon Railroad, and is a one-story, rectangular frame building measuring 45 by 18 feet (13.7 by 5.5 m). It has a gable roof with wide overhanging eaves. It originally served as a passenger station and freight depot until services were discontinued in 1961 and 1974, respectively. It was moved to its present location in 1980, and in 1981 a 20-by-18-foot (6.1 by 5.5 m) addition was constructed. The building was subsequently renovated and houses a local history museum.

It was listed on the National Register of Historic Places in 2013, and was delisted in 2023.

Preceding station	Monon Railroad	Following station
Westfield toward Monon	Monon – Indianapolis	Nora toward Indianapolis
