= Carmel, Indiana =

- City
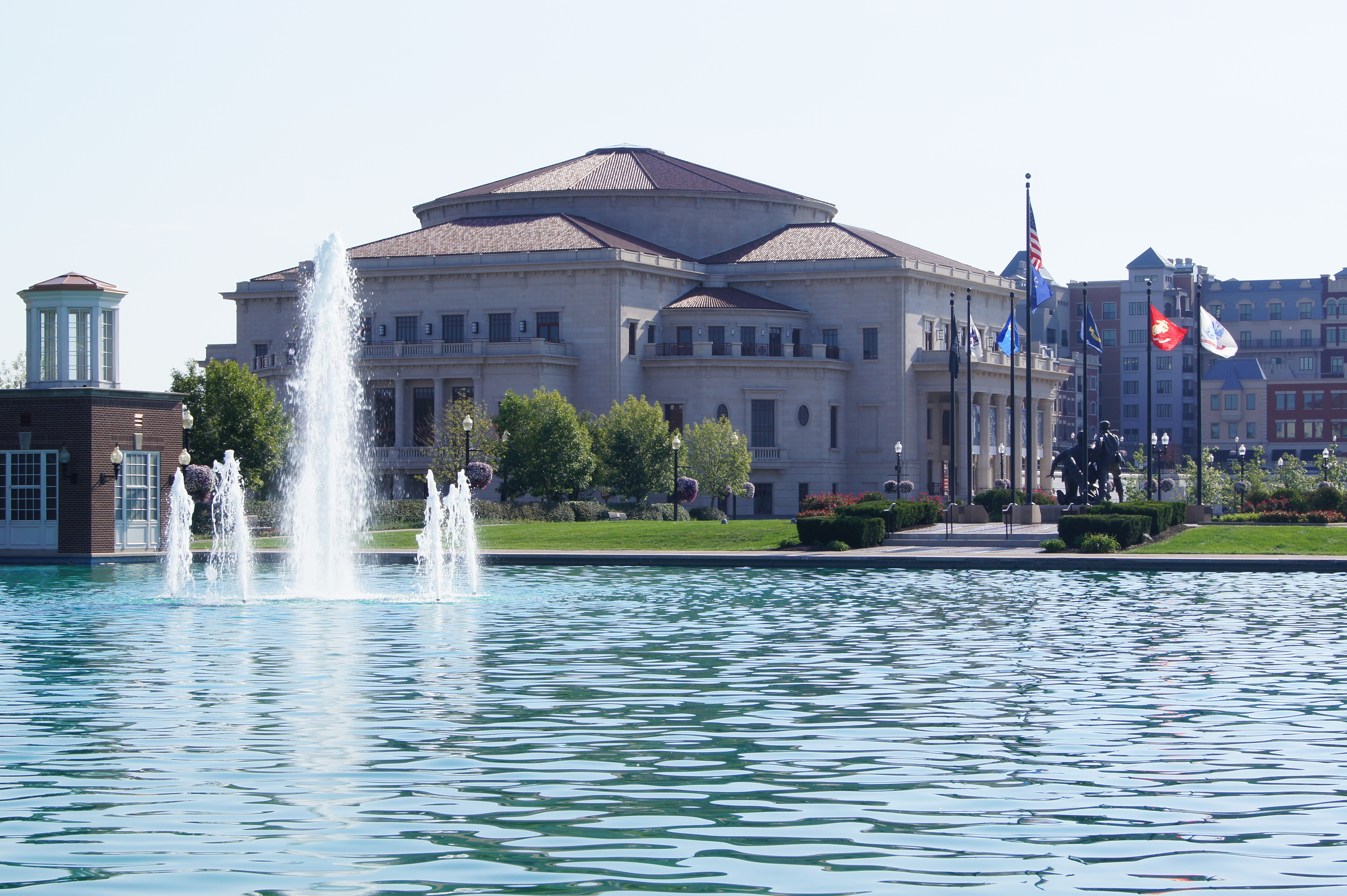
- The Palladium at the Center for the Performing Arts and Carmel City Center

- Flag Logo
- Motto: "Built For Big Dreams"
- Interactive map of Carmel, Indiana
- Location within Indiana Location within the United States
- Coordinates: 39°58′05″N 86°06′45″W
- Country: United States
- State: Indiana
- County: Hamilton
- Township: Clay
- Platted: 1837
- Incorporated: 1874 (town); January 1, 1976 (city)
- Named for: Carmel (biblical settlement)

Government
  - Mayor: Sue Finkam (R) (2024–present)

Area
  - Total: 50.17 sq mi (129.94 km^{2})
  - Land: 49.09 sq mi (127.13 km^{2})
  - Water: 1.08 sq mi (2.80 km^{2})
- Elevation: 843 ft (257 m)

Population (2020)
  - Total: 99,757
  - Estimate (2021): 100,777
  - Density: 2,032/sq mi (784.7/km^{2})
- Time zone: UTC−5 (EST)
  - Summer (DST): UTC−4 (EDT)
- ZIP codes: 46032, 46033, 46074, 46082, 46280, 46290
- Area codes: 317, 463
- FIPS code: 18-10342
- GNIS feature ID: 2393750
- Website: www.carmel.in.gov

Carmel (/ˈkɑːrməl/) is a suburban city in Hamilton County, Indiana, United States, immediately north of Indianapolis. With a population of 99,757 as of the 2020 census, the city spans 49 square miles (130 km^{2}) across Clay Township and is bordered by the White River to the east and the Boone County line to the west.

Carmel was home to one of the first electronic automated traffic signals in the country, and constructed 155 roundabouts between 1997 and 2025. The city is designed with walkability and pedestrian wellbeing in mind, with trails, parks and green spaces being common.

== History ==
In the 1820s, the government put the lands in the area on sale, leading many farmers to settle on the west bank of White River. The original settlers were predominantly Quakers.

Carmel was originally called "Bethlehem". It was platted and recorded in 1837 by Daniel Warren, Alexander Mills, John Phelps, and Seth Green, who donated their adjoining properties of equal size to create the town. The donated parcels were situated along the Indianapolis-Peru Road (now Westfield Boulevard). The Carmel Clay Historical Society also started its first activities in 1837.

The plot first established in Bethlehem, located at the intersection of Rangeline Road and Main Street, was marked by a clock tower donated by the local Rotary Club in 2002.

A post office was established as "Carmel" in 1846 because Indiana already had a post office called Bethlehem. The name Carmel is a reference to 1 Samuel 25:2 mentioning the biblical settlement Carmel. The town of Bethlehem was renamed "Carmel" and incorporated in 1874.

The Monon Railroad started operations in the city in 1883. Electricity and telephone lines arrived during the first decade of the 20th century. The city's first library was started by the local Wednesday Literary Club and schoolteacher Mahlon Luther Hains in 1904. With a grant from the Carnegie Foundation, the library was built at 40 East Main Streett in 1913. During the first half of the 20th century, the city was the host on and off of the Carmel Horse Show. The town's only bank closed in 1930.

In 1924, one of the first automatic traffic signals in the U.S. was installed at the intersection of Main Street and Rangeline Road. The signal was the invention of Leslie Haines and is currently in the old train station on the Monon Trail.

The Carmel Monon Depot, John Kinzer House, and Thornhurst Addition are listed on the National Register of Historic Places.

During the 1950s and 1960s, the city anticipated a demographic boom and built large new public schools, leading to the creation of the Carmel Clay School District in 1964 (and the Carmel Clay Educational Foundation in 1967). Six churches were built during the 1950s. The urban expansion was so fast that a 1958 Indianapolis Star article tagged it a "bedroom community", but one that could contribute to sustain the growth of Indianapolis. Construction of Interstate 465 started in 1967 and created the proper conditions for a rapid demographic growth. A new $330,000 library was built and opened in 1971.

The first Chamber of Commerce opened in 1960 but closed two years later. With the demographic boom of the 1970s, it reopened in 1970. Carmel Symphony Orchestra was launched by Latvian immigrant Viktors Ziedonis in 1976. That same year, Carmel was incorporated as a city. By the end of the 20th century, Carmel was one of Indiana's fastest growing cities. Suburban districts quickly replaced agricultural lands. The last farm operating within the city limits closed in 1993.

== Geography ==
Carmel occupies the southwestern part of Hamilton County, adjacent to Indianapolis and, with the annexation of Home Place in 2018, is now entirely coextensive with Clay Township. It is bordered to the north by Westfield, to the northeast by Noblesville, to the east by Fishers, to the south by Indianapolis in Marion County, and to the west by Zionsville in Boone County. The center of Carmel is 15 miles (24 km) north of the center of Indianapolis.

According to the 2010 census, Carmel has a total area of 48.545 square miles (125.73 km^{2}), of which 47.46 square miles (122.92 km^{2}) (or 97.76%) is land and 1.085 square miles (2.81 km^{2}) (or 2.24%) is water.

Major east–west streets in Carmel generally end in a 6 and include 96th Street (the southern border), 106th, 116th, 126th, 131st, 136th, and 146th (which marks the northern border). The numbering system is aligned to that of Marion and Hamilton counties. Main Street (131st) runs east–west through Carmel's Art & Design District; Carmel Drive runs generally east–west through the main shopping area, and City Center Drive runs east–west near Carmel's City Center project.

North–south streets are not numbered and include (west to east) Michigan, Shelborne, Towne, Ditch, Spring Mill, Meridian, Guilford, Rangeline, Keystone, Carey, Gray, Hazel Dell, and River. Some of these roads are continuations of corresponding streets in Indianapolis. Towne Road replaces the name Township Line Road at 96th Street, while Westfield Boulevard becomes Rangeline north of 116th Street. Meridian Street (US 31) and Keystone Parkway (formerly Keystone Avenue/SR 431) are the major thoroughfares, extending from 96th Street in the south and merging just south of 146th Street. The City of Carmel is noted for having well over 100 roundabouts within its borders.

== Demographics ==
Historical population
Census	Pop.	Note	%±
1880	92		—
1890	471		412.0%
1900	498		5.7%
1910	626		25.7%
1920	598		−4.5%
1930	682		14.0%
1940	771		13.0%
1950	1,009		30.9%
1960	1,442		42.9%
1970	6,691		364.0%
1980	18,272		173.1%
1990	25,380		38.9%
2000	37,733		48.7%
2010	79,191		109.9%
2020	99,757		26.0%
2025 (est.)	105,634		5.9%
U.S. Decennial Census; 2018 Estimate

=== Racial and ethnic composition ===
Carmel, Indiana – Racial and ethnic composition Note: the US Census treats Hispanic/Latino as an ethnic category. This table excludes Latinos from the racial categories and assigns them to a separate category. Hispanics/Latinos may be of any race.
Race / Ethnicity (NH = Non-Hispanic)	Pop 2000	Pop 2010	Pop 2020	% 2000	% 2010	% 2020
White alone (NH)	34,467	66,295	75,534	91.34%	83.72%	75.72%
Black or African American alone (NH)	550	2,299	3,256	1.46%	2.90%	3.26%
Native American or Alaska Native alone (NH)	45	104	65	0.12%	0.13%	0.07%
Asian alone (NH)	1,645	6,988	11,966	4.36%	8.82%	12.00%
Native Hawaiian or Pacific Islander alone (NH)	12	17	20	0.03%	0.02%	0.02%
Other race alone (NH)	48	169	451	0.13%	0.21%	0.45%
Mixed race or Multiracial (NH)	317	1,310	3,944	0.84%	1.65%	3.95%
Hispanic or Latino (any race)	649	2,009	4,521	1.72%	2.54%	4.53%
Total	37,733	79,191	99,757	100.00%	100.00%	100.00%

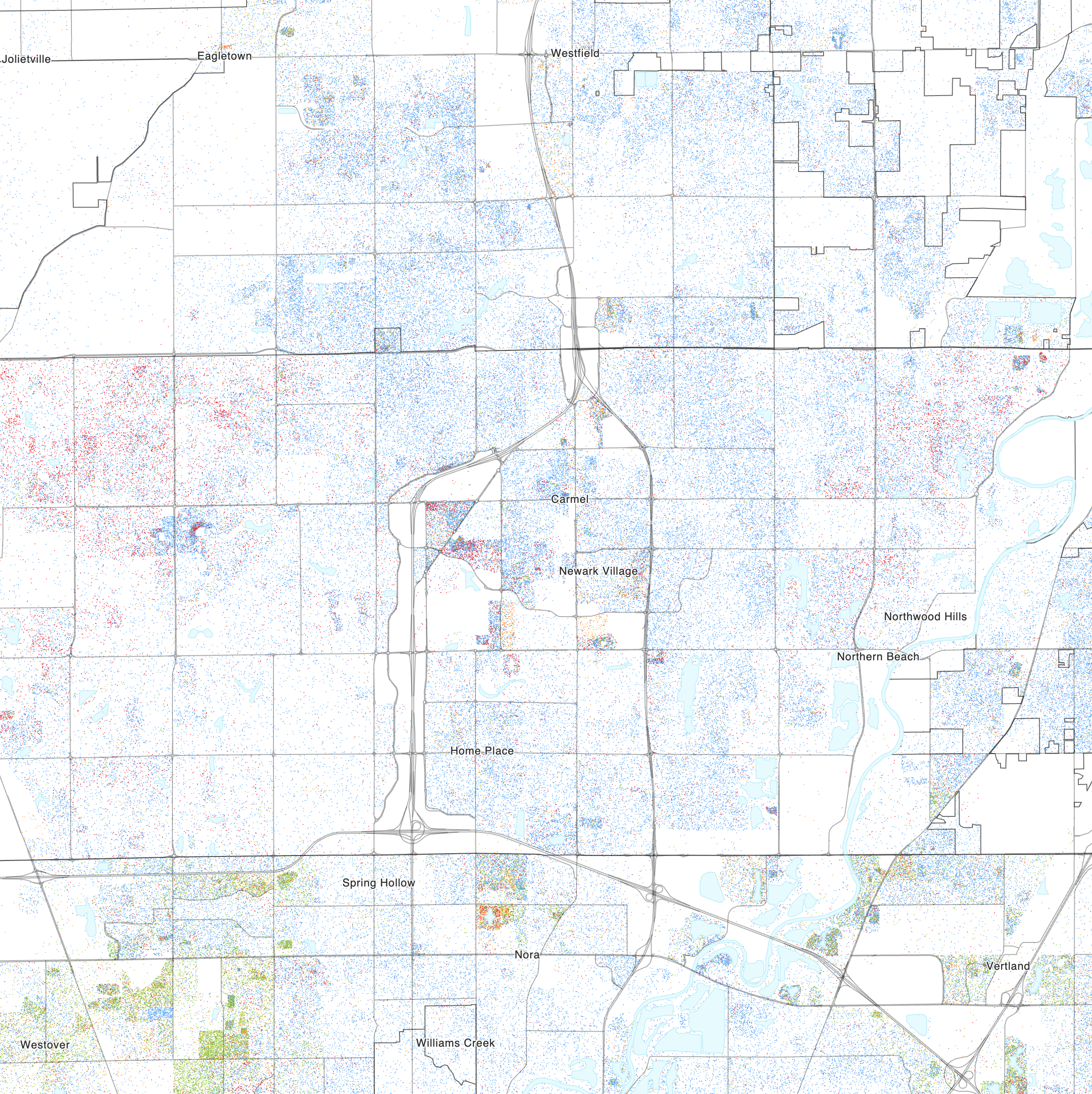
Map of racial distribution in Carmel, 2020 U.S. census. Each dot is one person: ⬤ White ⬤ Black ⬤ Asian ⬤ Hispanic ⬤ Multiracial ⬤ Native American/Other

=== 2020 census ===
As of the 2020 census, Carmel had a population of 99,757. The median age was 40.1 years. 25.5% of residents were under the age of 18 and 15.0% of residents were 65 years of age or older. For every 100 females there were 95.2 males, and for every 100 females age 18 and over there were 92.8 males age 18 and over.

99.9% of residents lived in urban areas, while 0.1% lived in rural areas.

There were 37,821 households in Carmel, of which 36.0% had children under the age of 18 living in them. Of all households, 62.3% were married-couple households, 12.9% were households with a male householder and no spouse or partner present, and 20.5% were households with a female householder and no spouse or partner present. About 23.0% of all households were made up of individuals and 8.5% had someone living alone who was 65 years of age or older.

There were 39,927 housing units, of which 5.3% were vacant. The homeowner vacancy rate was 1.1% and the rental vacancy rate was 8.6%.

Racial composition as of the 2020 census
Race	Number	Percent
White	76,344	76.5%
Black or African American	3,330	3.3%
American Indian and Alaska Native	119	0.1%
Asian	12,009	12.0%
Native Hawaiian and Other Pacific Islander	23	0.0%
Some other race	1,403	1.4%
Two or more races	6,529	6.5%
Hispanic or Latino (of any race)	4,521	4.5%

=== Income and housing ===
According to a 2024 estimate, the median household income in the city was $134,602.

The median home price between 2019 and 2023 was $455,500.

=== 2010 census ===
As of the census of 2010, there were 79,191 people, 28,997 households, and 21,855 families residing in the city. The population density was 1,668.6 inhabitants per square mile (644.3/km^{2}). There were 30,738 housing units at an average density of 647.7 units per square mile (250.1 units/km^{2}). The racial makeup of the city was 85.4% White, 3.0% African American, 0.2% Native American, 8.9% Asian, 0.7% from other races, and 1.8% from two or more races. Hispanic or Latino people of any race were 2.5% of the population.

There were 28,997 households, of which 41.7% had children under the age of 18 living with them, 66.6% were married couples living together, 6.3% had a female householder with no partner present, 2.4% had a male householder with no partner present, and 24.6% were non-families. 20.8% of all households were made up of individuals, and 6.7% had someone living alone who was 65 years of age or older. The average household size was 2.71 and the average family size was 3.18.

The median age in the city was 39.2 years. 29.4% of residents were under the age of 18; 5.3% were between the ages of 18 and 24; 25.2% were from 25 to 44; 29.7% were from 45 to 64; and 10.4% were 65 years of age or older. The gender makeup of the city was 48.7% male and 51.3% female.

== Economy ==
The Meridian Corridor serves as a large concentration of corporate office space within the city. It is home to more than 40 corporate headquarters and many more regional offices. Several large companies reside in Carmel, and it serves as the national headquarters for OPENLANE (formerly KAR Global), Allegion, CNO Financial Group, MISO, and Delta Faucet. Carmel also serves as the global headquarters for several fraternities and sororities.

Clay Terrace is one of the largest retail centers in Carmel and sits adjacent to Village Park Plaza, another retail hub lying just across the municipal border with Westfield. Other shopping areas include Carmel City Center, Mohawk Trails Plaza, and Merchants' Square. The Carmel Arts & Design District has a number of retail establishments along Main Street, Range Line Road, 3rd Avenue, and 2nd Street.

Founded in 2017, Carmel Christkindlmarkt is an open air Christmas market known for its Glühwein Pyramid, a 33-foot tall (10 m) structure lit with 3,000 bulbs. The market is one of Indiana's top tourist attractions hosting over 400,000 visitors annually.

=== Top employers ===
As of January 2017, the city's 10 largest employers were:

#	Employer	# of employees
1	CNO Financial Group	1,600
2	GEICO	1,250
3	RCI	1,125
4	Capital Group Companies	975
5	Liberty Mutual	900
6	KAR Auction Services (Adesa)	892
7	IU Health North	800
8	Midcontinent ISO	700
9	NextGear Capital	694
10	Allegion	595

== Arts and culture ==
=== Festivals ===
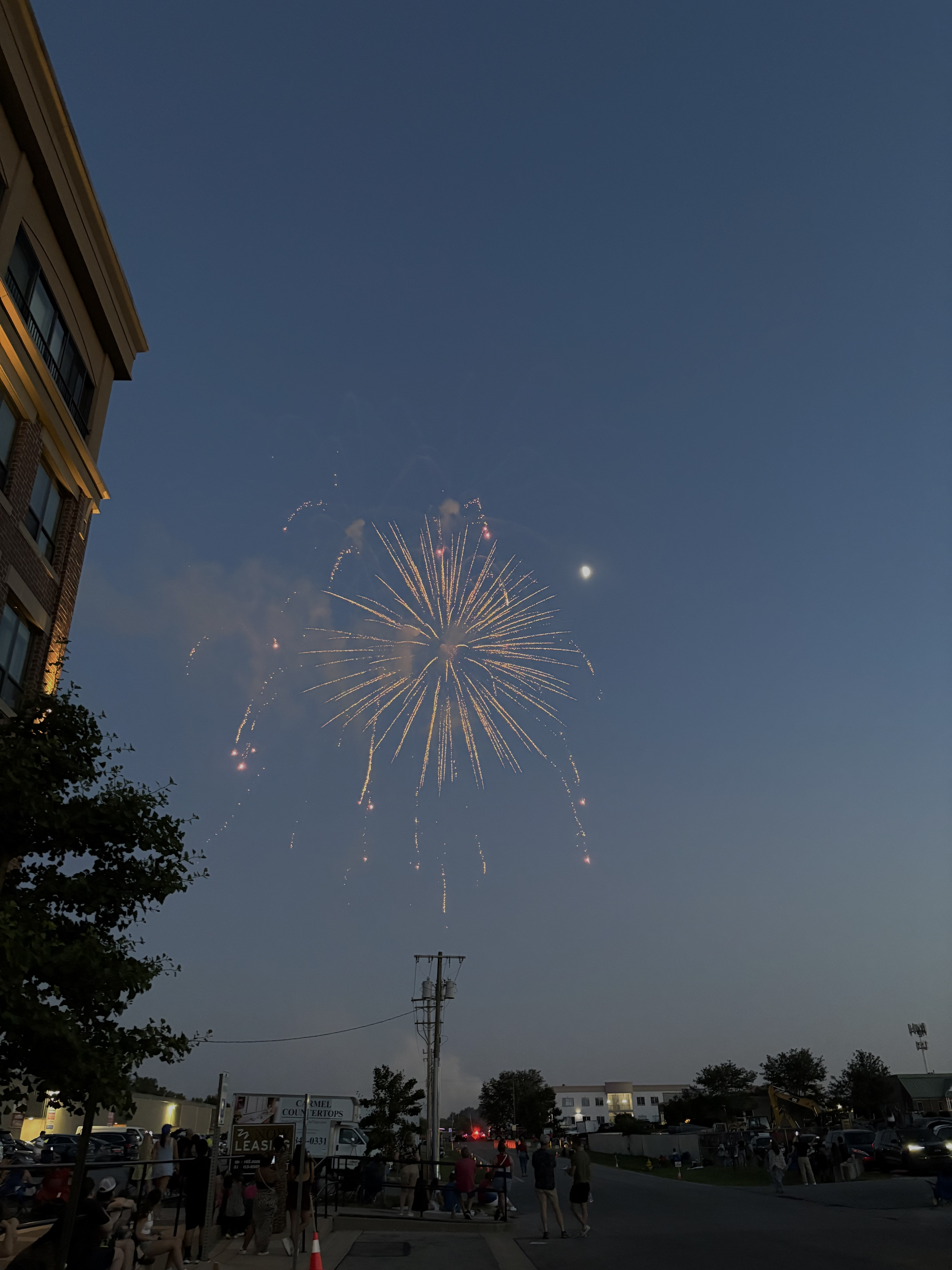
Fireworks launched from Carmel Ice Skadium parking lot during Carmel Fest

CarmelFest is the city's annual 4th of July celebration that has occurred since 1988. Since at least 2001, the festival has taken place over two days: July 3 and 4. CarmelFest includes a parade on July 4 that starts on AAA Way, heads west on E Carmel Drive, north on Rangeline Rd, east on Main St, and ends at the intersection of Main St and 4th Ave. The festival itself consists of live music and booths at both Carter Green and around the Carmel Fountain, connected by the Monon Trail. Petting zoos and carnival rides are set up in the parking lot behind City Hall. Fireworks are launched for 30 minutes and livestreamed. CarmelFest is organized by the Carmel Rotary Club and financially supported by local businesses including Republic Airways and Allied Solutions.

Carmel Pride is an annual Pride festival that takes place on Carter Green during the month of June, featuring performances, activities, and booths for food and merchandise vendors, and organizations. The festival was first organized by a group of Carmel High School students in 2021 and again in 2022. Later, the festival transitioned to having both adult and student organizers. In 2025, organizers stated it was the second-largest Pride festival in the state after Indy Pride with over 3,000 attendees. Carmel Pride has featured an evening drag show since its inception.

The Chinese Mooncake Festival has been held annually between August and October since 2013. It is a celebration of the Chinese Mid Autumn Festival and features a dragon parade and free mooncakes and tea. Initially, the festival took place at the green space bordering the Monon trail and Main St, but moved to the parking lot at 200 Rangeline Rd in 2016 after that space was developed. Since 2022, the festival has taken place at Midtown Plaza.

Indy GreekFest is a celebration of Greek Culture organized by the Holy Trinity Greek Orthodox Cathedral in Carmel, with proceeds supporting the church and a local food pantry. The festival includes Greek music, dance troupes, and vendors selling Greek food. GreekFest was founded in 1974 and moved to Carmel in 2009.

Other festivals include the Festival of Ice (with an outdoor ice sculpture gallery), Porchfest (a music festival where residents perform on their porches), Carmel Oktoberfest, EidFest, and Diwali: Festival of Lights.

=== Museums ===
The museum of the Carmel Clay Historical Society. Housed in the historic Monon Railroad Depot, this local history museum expanded with a new building in 2024.

The Great American Songbook Foundation, a national nonprofit museum and archives dedicated to celebrating American popular music and founded by singer and music history enthusiast Michael Feinstein, is headquartered in the Palladium at the Center for the Performing Arts.

=== Visual and performing arts ===
Designed to promote small businesses and local artisans, Carmel's Arts and Design District and City Center is in Old Town Carmel and flanked by Carmel High School on the east and the Monon Greenway on the west, with the state goal of celebrating the creativity and craftsmanship of the miniature art form. The district includes the Carmel Clay Public Library. The district hosts several annual events and festivals. The Carmel Artomobilia Collector Car Show showcases classic, vintage, exotic and rare cars, along with art inspired by automobile design. Every September, the Carmel International Arts Festival features a juried art exhibit of artists from around the world, concerts, dance performances, and hands-on activities for children.

Located in the Arts and Design District and opened in 1993, the Museum of Miniature Houses and Other Collections features scale model miniatures, primarily fine art dollhouses and room boxes. It is notable for displaying two room boxes from Narcissa Niblack Throne and its annual Attic Sale.

Carmel City Center is a one-million-square-foot (93,000 m^{2}), $300 million, mixed-use development located in the heart of Carmel. Carmel City Center is home to the Palladium at the Center for the Performing Arts, which includes a 1,600-seat concert hall, 500-seat theater, and 200-seat black box theater.

== Parks and recreation ==
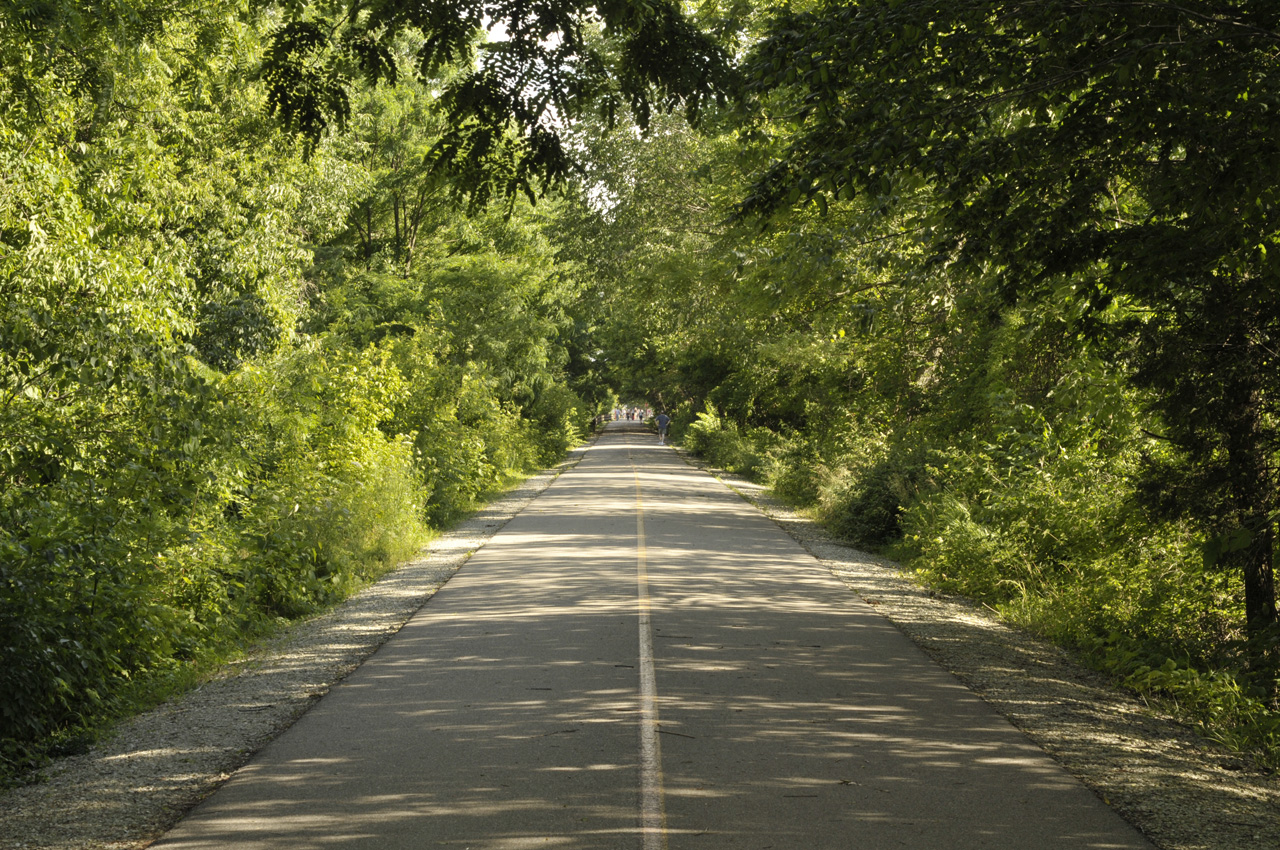
Monon Greenway in 2008

The Monon Greenway is a multi-use trail that is part of the Rails-to-Trails movement. It runs from 10th Street near downtown Indianapolis through Broad Ripple and then crosses into Carmel at 96th Street and continues north through 146th Street into Westfield and continues to Sheridan.

A water park and fitness center is the centerpiece of Carmel's Central Park.

Ground was broken for the Japanese Garden south of City Hall in 2007. The garden was dedicated in 2009 as the 15th anniversary of Carmel's Sister City relationship with Kawachinagano, Japan, was celebrated. An Azumaya-style tea gazebo was constructed in 2011 and dedicated on May 2 of that year.

== Government ==
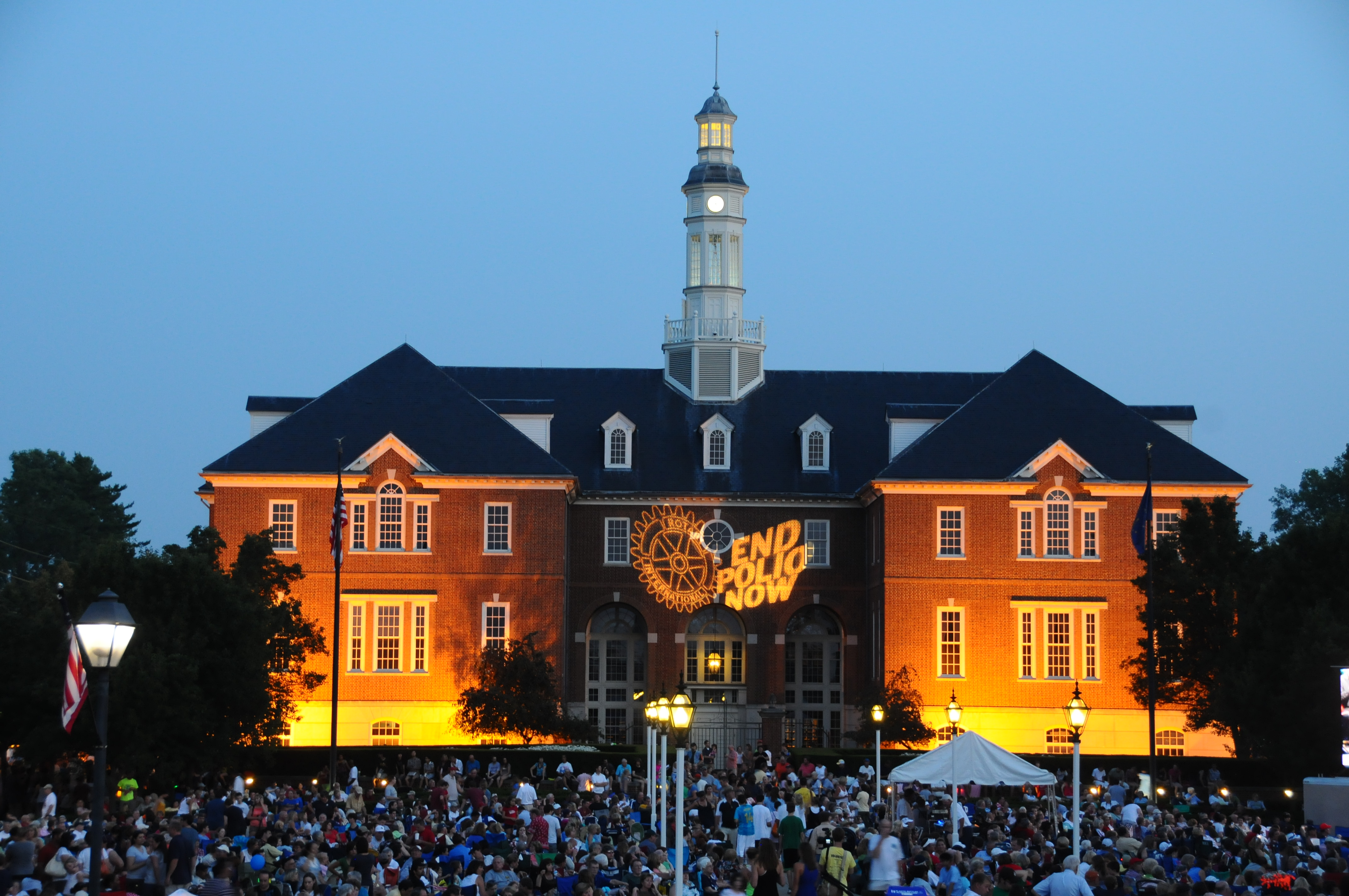
Carmel City Hall in 2010

The government consists of a mayor and a city council. The current mayor is Sue Finkam, who has served since 2024. The city leans Republican on a municipal level, but also leans Democratic in state and national elections since 2020, and is generally socially liberal.

=== Planned development ===
In mid-2017, the city council was considering a multimillion-dollar bond issue that would cover the cost of roundabouts, paths, roadwork, land acquisition by the Carmel Redevelopment Commission and would include the purchase of an antique carousel from a Canadian amusement park for an estimated purchase price of CAD $3 million, approximately US$2.25 million. However, a citizen-led petition drive against the purchase caused the city council to remove it from the bond issue.

According to the Indiana Department of Local Government Finance, as of 2019 the City of Carmel had an overall debt load of $1.3 billion.

=== List of mayors ===
No.	Portrait	Mayor	Term of office	Election	Party
1		Albert Pickett	January 1, 1976 – January 1, 1980	1975	Republican
2		Jane A. Reiman	January 1, 1980 – January 1, 1988	1979	Republican
2		Jane A. Reiman	January 1, 1980 – January 1, 1988	1983	Republican
3		Dorothy J. Hancock	January 1, 1988 – January 1, 1992	1987	Republican
4		Ted Johnson	January 1, 1992 – January 1, 1996	1991	Republican
5		James Brainard	January 1, 1996 – January 1, 2024	1995	Republican
5		James Brainard	January 1, 1996 – January 1, 2024	1999	Republican
5		James Brainard	January 1, 1996 – January 1, 2024	2003	Republican
5		James Brainard	January 1, 1996 – January 1, 2024	2007	Republican
5		James Brainard	January 1, 1996 – January 1, 2024	2011	Republican
5		James Brainard	January 1, 1996 – January 1, 2024	2015	Republican
5		James Brainard	January 1, 1996 – January 1, 2024	2019	Republican
6		Sue Finkam	January 1, 2024 – Incumbent	2023	Republican

== Education ==
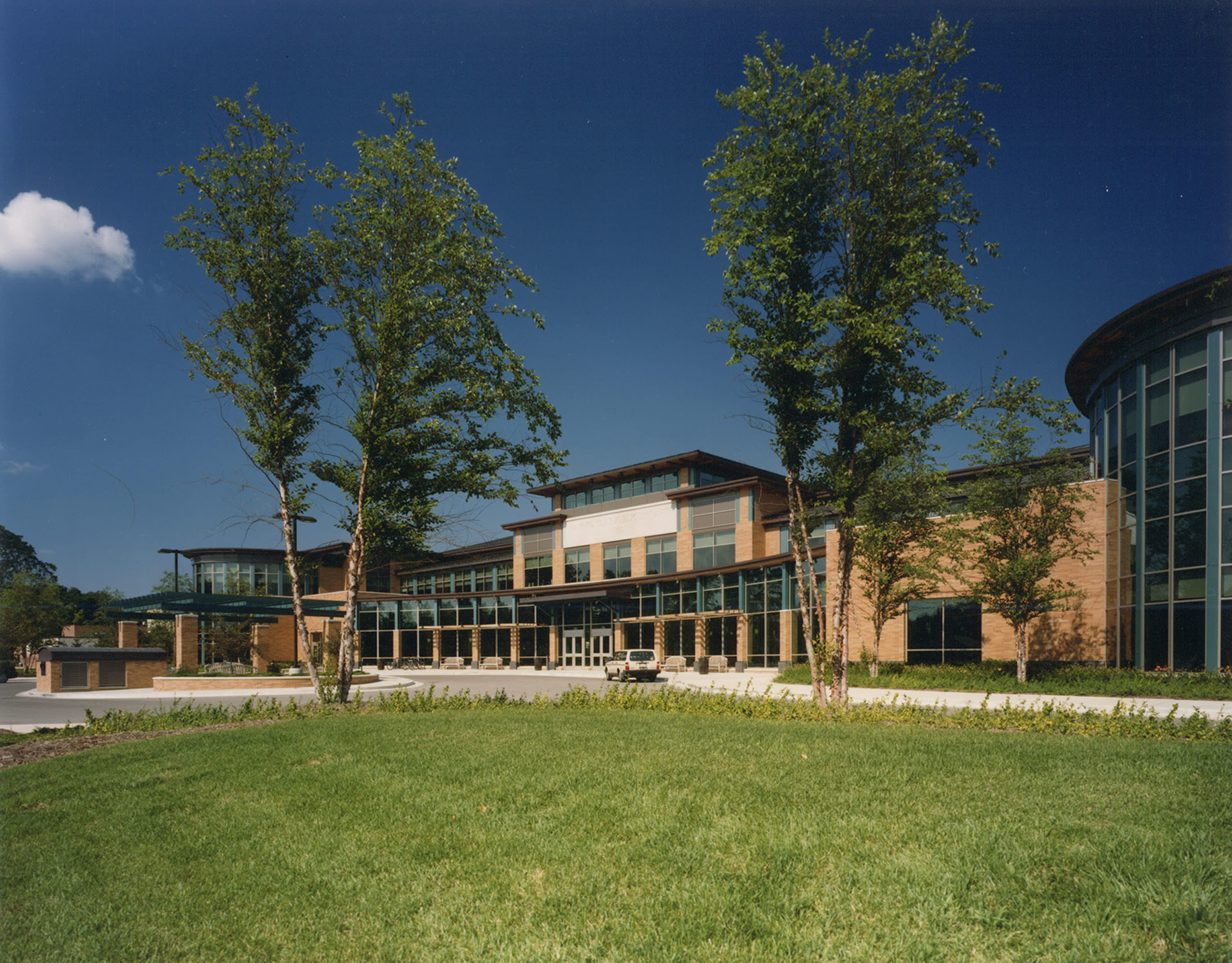
Carmel Clay Public Library

=== Public schools ===
The municipality is almost entirely in the Carmel Clay Schools school district. The Carmel Clay Schools district has 11 elementary schools (Kindergarten - Grade 5), three middle schools (Grades 6–8), and one high school (Grades 9–12). Student enrollment for the district is above 14,500.

The elementary schools include:

- Carmel Elementary (Feeds into Carmel Middle School)
- Cherry Tree Elementary (Feeds into Clay Middle School)
- Clay Center Elementary (Feeds into Creekside Middle School)
- College Wood Elementary (Feeds into Creekside Middle School)
- Forest Dale Elementary (Feeds into Carmel Middle School)
- Mohawk Trails Elementary (Feeds into Clay Middle School)
- Prairie Trace Elementary (Feeds into Clay Middle School)
- Smoky Row Elementary (Feeds into Carmel Middle School)
- Towne Meadow Elementary (Feeds into Creekside Middle School)
- West Clay Elementary (Feeds into Creekside Middle School)
- Woodbrook Elementary (Feeds into Clay Middle School)

The middle schools include:

- Carmel Middle School
- Clay Middle School
- Creekside Middle School

All middle schools feed into Carmel High School.

A small piece of Carmel is in the Westfield-Washington Schools school district.

=== Private schools ===
Carmel has several private schools, including:

- Coram Deo Academy (Kindergarten–Grade 12)
- Midwest Academy (Grades 3–12)
- Our Lady of Mount Carmel Catholic School (Kindergarten–Grade 8)
- Pilgrim Lutheran Preschool (Preschool)
- St. Elizabeth Seton Preschool (Preschool, Pre-Kindergarten, and Kindergarten)
- University High School (Grades 9–12)
- Walnut Grove Christian Prep School (Kindergarten–Grade 12)

== Transportation ==
Unusually for a city of this size, Carmel does not have a fixed-route bus system. The only public transportation available in the city is a van service similar to paratransit systems in other cities, Hamilton County Express. It requires making reservations in advance, and had a ridership of about 76,000 in 2024.

== Notable people ==
- Bernie Allen, baseball player
- Ted Allen, television personality
- Franklin Booth, pen-and-ink artist
- Steve Chassey, IndyCar driver
- Pete Dye, golf course designer
- Alex Hall, author known for Ben Drowned (2010)
- Mark Herrmann, Purdue and NFL quarterback
- Jay Howard, British racing driver
- Steve Inskeep, host of Morning Edition, National Public Radio
- Drew Kibler, Olympic swimmer
- Kyle Krisiloff, racing driver
- Rebecca Kubacki, former Republican member of the Indiana House of Representatives
- Midwxst, rapper
- Cameron Lindley, soccer player
- Jake Lloyd, former actor known for his portrayal of young Anakin Skywalker in Star Wars: Episode I – The Phantom Menace
- Josh McRoberts, former professional basketball player for the Dallas Mavericks
- Dorothy Letterman Mengering, mother of comedian and talk show host David Letterman
- Jason Padgett, math savant
- Mike Pence, 48th vice president of the United States
- Rajeev Ram, professional tennis player, winner of 2019 Australian Open – Mixed Doubles tournament
- Matt Reiswerg (born 1980), soccer player, coach, and administrator
- Takuma Sato, Japanese racing driver
- Lee Schmidt, golf course designer
- Rob Schmitt, reporter and Fox News co-host, now host at Newsmax TV
- Aaron Shackell, Olympic swimmer
- Alex Shackell, Olympic swimmer
- Avriel Shull, architectural designer/builder and interior decorator
- Zach Trotman, former professional hockey player (Boston Bruins, Pittsburgh Penguins)
- Sheldon Vanauken, author known for A Severe Mercy (1977)
- Seema Verma, health policy consultant and former administrator of the Centers for Medicare and Medicaid Services
- Todd Young, currently the senior United States senator from Indiana
- Andrew Lee, VPN magnate, crypto entrepreneur, and claimant to the head of the House of Yi

== Sister cities ==
=== Current ===
Carmel has six sister cities as designated by Sister Cities International.

- Kawachinagano, Osaka Prefecture, Japan (1994)
- Jelgava, Semigallia, Latvia (2022)
- Cortona, Tuscany, Italy (2022)
- Visakhapatnam, Andhra Pradesh, India (2023)
- Rueil-Malmaison, France (2023)
- Seiffen, Saxony, Germany (2023)

=== Former ===
- Shanghai, Pudong, China (2012–2024)

== See also ==
- List of edge cities
