= Carmel Clay Schools =

School district in Indiana

Address
- 5201 E. Main Street (131st) Carmel, Indiana, 46033; United States

District information
- Type: Public
- Motto: Experience Excellence...Explore Opportunities...Realize Potential
- Grades: K–12
- Superintendent: Tom Oestreich
- Chair of the board: Michael Kerschner (2019)
- Accreditation: AdvancED (2014)

Students and staff
- Students: 16,352 (2018-2019)

Other information
- Website: District Website

The Carmel Clay School District is a public school district located in Carmel, Indiana, serving Carmel, which has been coterminous with Clay Township since 2018. The district includes almost all of Carmel. The district operates 11 elementary schools (grades K-5), three middle schools (grades 6–8) and one high school, with an overall enrollment of 16,011 in the 2024-2025 school year. The district superintendent is Dr. Thomas Oestreich and the Board President is Jon Shapiro. The former superintendent, Micheal Beresford announced his retirement in July 2024, and Dr. Thomas Oestreich took over in July 2025.

The district is nationally recognized for excellence, has been awarded 10 National Blue Ribbon Awards, and is consistently rated the top-performing public school district in the State of Indiana. According to state test scores, 72% of students are at least proficient in math and 73% in reading.

== Schools ==
=== Elementary schools ===
- Carmel Elementary School (opened 1961, new building 2021)
- Cherry Tree Elementary School (opened 1989)
- Clay Center Elementary School (opened 2021)
- College Wood Elementary School (opened 1965, relocated 2004)
- Forest Dale Elementary School (opened 1979)
- Mohawk Trails Elementary School (opened 1972)
- Prairie Trace Elementary School (opened 1998)
- Smoky Row Elementary School (opened 1992)
- Towne Meadow Elementary School (opened 2000)
- West Clay Elementary School (opened 2006)
- Woodbrook Elementary School (opened 1970)

=== Middle schools ===
- Carmel Middle School (opened as Carmel Junior High School in 1964)
- Clay Middle School (opened as Clay Junior High School in 1974)
- Creekside Middle School (opened 2004)

=== High school ===
- Carmel High School

=== Former schools ===
- Orchard Park Elementary School (opened 1955, closed and used as city storage 2021, to be demolished because of structural issues from flooding)
