= List of Indianapolis Colts starting quarterbacks =

The Indianapolis Colts are a professional American football team based in Indianapolis, Indiana. They are currently members of the South Division of the American Football Conference (AFC) in the National Football League (NFL).

The club was officially founded in Baltimore, Maryland, in 1953, as the Baltimore Colts, replacing a previous team of that name that folded in 1950. After 31 seasons in Baltimore, Colts owner Robert Irsay moved the team to Indianapolis.

The Colts have had 33 starting quarterbacks (QB) in the history of their franchise. The Colts' past starting quarterbacks include Pro Football Hall of Fame inductee Johnny Unitas, as well as the Associated Press National Football League Most Valuable Player Award (MVP) winners Earl Morrall and Bert Jones. Unitas also won the MVP award three times in his career. The franchise's first starting quarterback was Fred Enke, who started 9 games in total for the Colts. The Colts' starting quarterback from 1998 to 2011 was 5-time MVP Peyton Manning. Manning's tenure was followed by Andrew Luck from 2012 to 2018, until his sudden retirement during the 2019 preseason. Originally meant to serve as a backup, Jacoby Brissett ended up starting 15 games for the Colts in the 2017 season due to Luck being injured, and threw for over 3,000 yards and 13 touchdowns; he returned to his backup role the following year. Following Luck's retirement prior to the 2019 season, Brissett became the Colts full-time starting quarterback. Prior to the 2020 season, the Colts signed free agent Philip Rivers, making Brissett again the backup quarterback. On February 18, 2021, the Colts traded a 2021 third-round pick and a 2022 second-round conditional pick to the Philadelphia Eagles for quarterback Carson Wentz. Brissett signed as a free agent with the Miami Dolphins, and Wentz became the Colts' starting quarterback. He started all seventeen of the Colts' games in the league's first season in the new format, before being traded to the Washington Commanders. Indianapolis then traded a 3rd-round pick in the 2022 NFL draft for longtime Atlanta Falcons star Matt Ryan, who started at quarterback in each of the Colts' first seven games to begin the 2022 season.

== History ==
The Colts struggled early on to find consistency and stability at the quarterback position with 5 different quarterbacks starting at least one game in the first two seasons of the franchise. George Shaw became the first Colts quarterback to complete a full season. The following year Shaw broke his leg in the fourth game of the season against the Chicago Bears allowing former Pittsburgh Steeler quarterback Johnny Unitas a chance to start. Over the next 16 seasons Unitas would start 182 games for the Colts. In this time Unitas was named to 10 Pro-Bowls, and won the MVP award 3 times. With Unitas under center the Colts also won 2 NFL Championships and a Super Bowl. In the final game of the 1968 preseason, the muscles in Unitas' arm were torn when he was hit by a member of the Dallas Cowboys defense. The Colts would turn to backup quarterback Earl Morrall to lead the offense. The Colts marched to a league-best 13–1 record and Morrall was named the 1968 MVP. Despite this strong season and the return of Unitas during the game the Colts lost the Super Bowl to the AFL's New York Jets and their quarterback Joe Namath. In 1970 the Colts, with Unitas under center, would return to the Super Bowl in 1970. After Unitas was injured in the second quarter Morrall stepped in and led the Colts from a 7-point deficit at half time to a 3-point victory over the Dallas Cowboys.

Unitas continued as the Colts' legendary QB, but age and injuries began to plague him further and in a hotly debated move, GM Joe Thomas traded him to the San Diego Chargers. The team wasted no time replacing Unitas by drafting Bert Jones in the 1973 NFL draft. During his eight-year tenure as the Colts' starting quarterback, Jones led the team to three consecutive AFC East division titles and was awarded the 1976 AP MVP award. The Colts regular season success wasn't replicated in the post season, however, with the team losing all three of their playoff games – first the Steelers in 1975 and 1976, then in 1977 a 37–31 loss to the Oakland Raiders, known as the "Ghost to the Post" game and the third longest playoff game ever. It would be the last playoff game ever played by the Baltimore Colts.

Jones began to become injury prone and between that and poor personnel moves, the Colts suffered hard times in the late 1970s/early 1980s. Jones was then traded to the Rams in 1982 and the Colts again began a search for a new starting quarterback. In the interim quarterback Mike Pagel filled in as the starter. In the 1983 NFL draft the Colts drafted quarterback John Elway, but in another hotly debated and oft-criticized move, Elway declined to play for the team that drafted him, insisting he would play professional baseball instead. The Colts' owner traded him to the Denver Broncos for quarterback Mark Herrmann, rights to offensive lineman Chris Hinton and a first-round pick in the 1984 NFL draft. Even at the time it was considered a horrible trade for the Colts and a coup for the Broncos. Mike Pagel therefore remained as the starter, though sometimes losing his position to top draft pick Art Schlichter, who was a notorious bust, due largely to a gambling addiction which affected his play and ultimately saw him kicked out of the league.

In the 1986, the Colts selected Jack Trudeau in the 2nd round of the draft. Trudeau would remain the starter for the next few years, though Gary Hogeboom and Chris Chandler were obtained and started at various times. In 1987 Trudeau lead the Colts in their first playoff game since the team moved to Indianapolis. The Colts lost the game against the Cleveland Browns by a score of 38 to 21.

In 1990, the Colts again had the 1st overall and selected quarterback Jeff George, who even then was known as a world-class talent with a questionable attitude. This proved to be accurate, as George's four years in Indianapolis would end with four years of erratic play (behind an admittedly so-so team) with a trade to the Atlanta Falcons.

In 1994 the Colts signed Jim Harbaugh. In 1995, Harbaugh and the Colts surprised everyone by reaching the playoffs. Harbaugh was voted to the Pro Bowl, named Comeback Player of the Year, and was runner-up in the AP NFL MVP voting. The post-season was even more surprising, as Harbaugh led the Colts all the way to the 1995 AFC Championship Game, ending a playoff drought of 24 years without a playoff win and narrowly missing a Super Bowl berth on the last play of the game. After a last-place 3–13 record in 1997, Harbaugh was traded to the Baltimore Ravens.

In 1998 the Colts, for the 4th time in 15 years, held the 1st overall pick in the draft and for the 3rd time in 15 years selected a quarterback – this time University of Tennessee's Peyton Manning. Manning started the first game of his rookie season and started every single Colts game since until the start of the 2011 season, when a recurring neck injury sidelined him. Despite a difficult rookie season, where he threw a league high 28 interceptions, Manning and the Colts responded by finishing 13–3 in 1999. The 10 game turnaround from the previous year set an NFL record. Even with this turnaround, the Colts lost in the playoffs. The following years would be marked by a near constant pattern. The Colts and Manning successes in the regular season were matched only by their failures in the post season. Manning was named to the Pro Bowl in 1999, 2000, 2002, 2003 and 2004, as well as winning the NFL MVP award in both 2003 and 2004. In 2004 Manning set a then NFL record when he threw 49 touchdowns in a single season. In spite of this the team failed in the playoffs, including early round exits in 1999, 2000, 2002 and 2005. In both 2003 and 2004 the Colts would lose to eventual Super Bowl winning New England Patriots in the AFC Championship Game and the Divisional Round respectively. In 2006 the Colts and Manning were finally able to beat the Patriots and their quarterback Tom Brady in the AFC Championship Game on their way to a victory in Super Bowl XLI against the Chicago Bears. Manning was named the Super Bowl MVP. The Colts and Manning would continue to have success, with Manning winning two further MVP awards in 2008 and 2009. In 2009 the Colts would return to the Super Bowl where they would lose to the New Orleans Saints.

== Starting quarterbacks by season ==
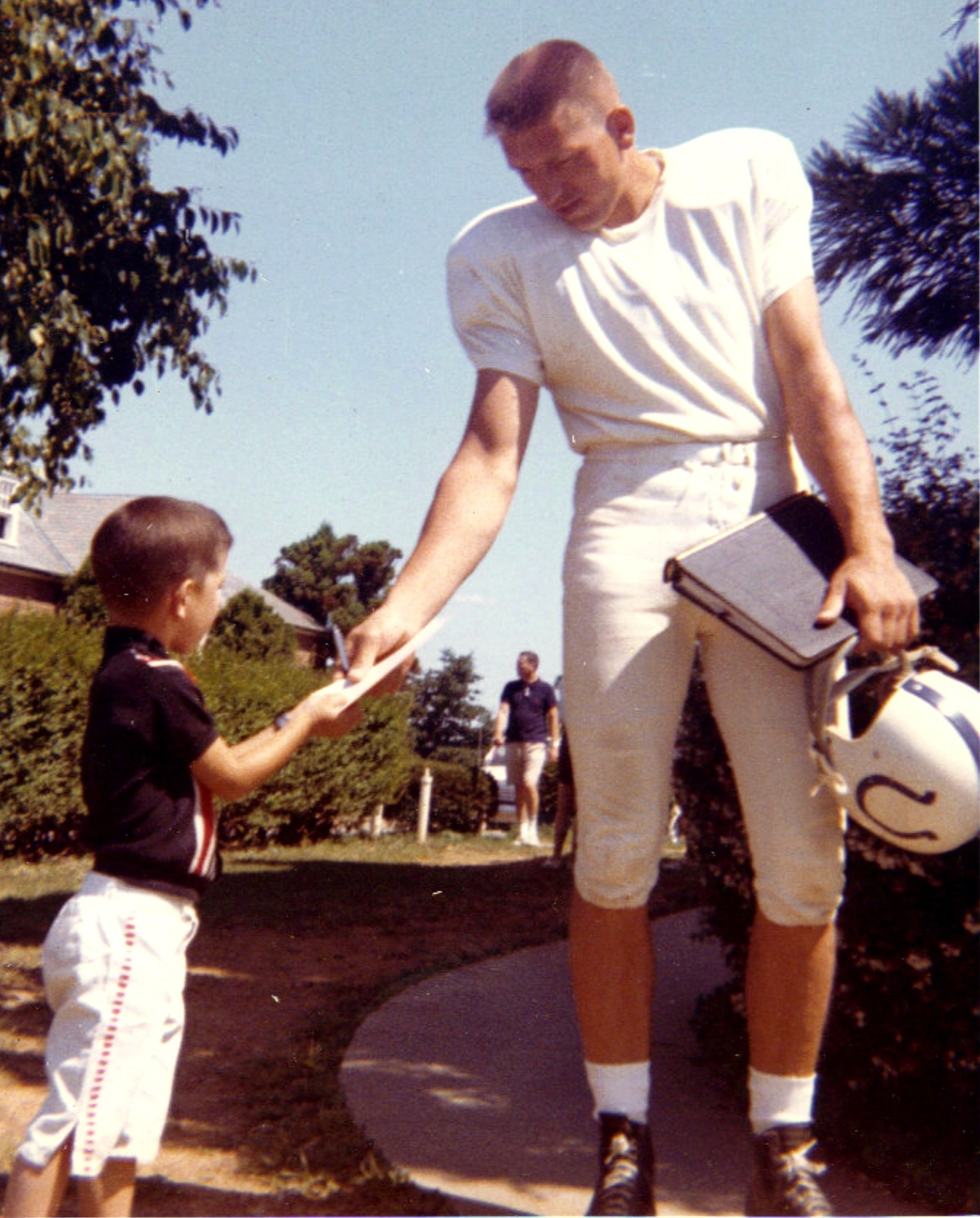
Pro Football Hall of Fame inductee Johnny Unitas was the Baltimore Colts' starting quarterback from 1956 to 1972.

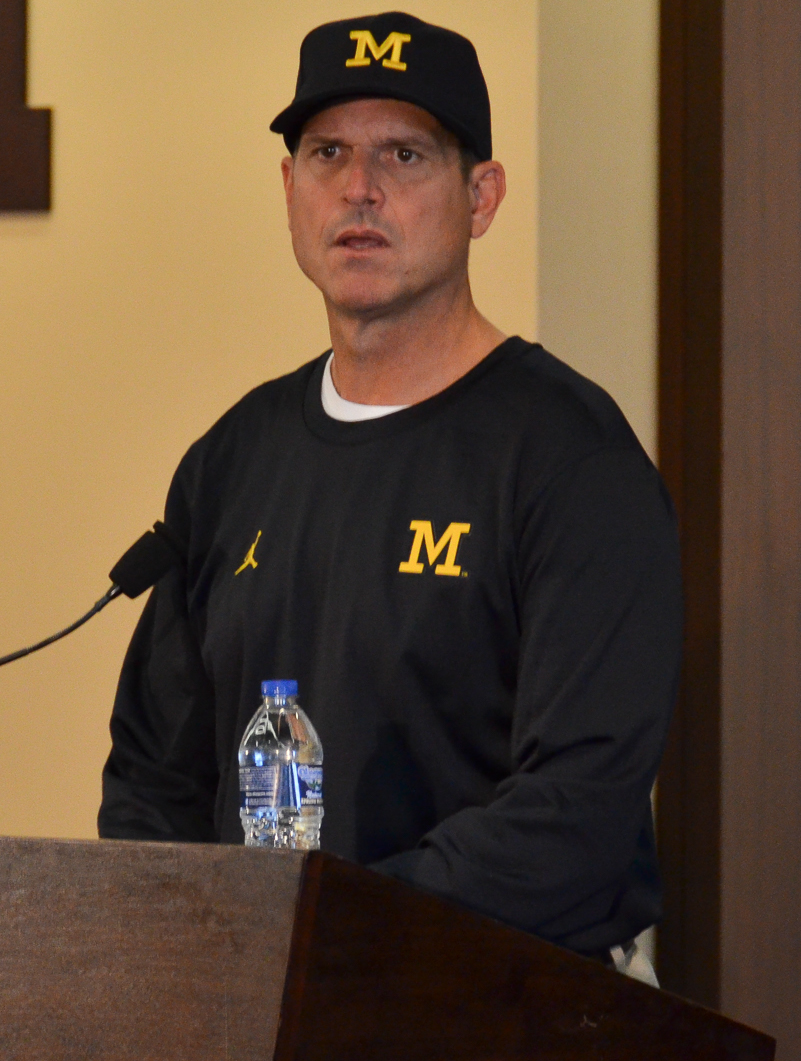
Jim Harbaugh was the Indianapolis Colts' starting quarterback from 1994 to 1997.

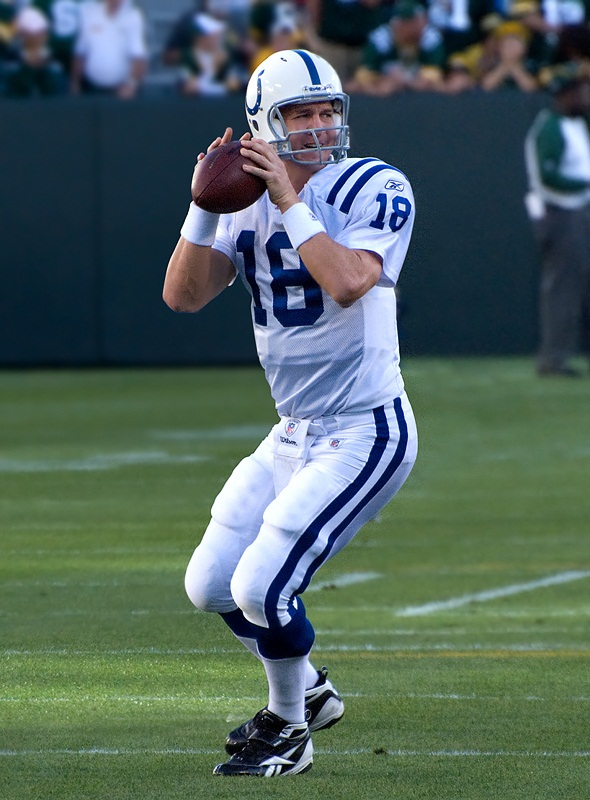
Peyton Manning was the starting quarterback for the Colts from 1998 until 2011.

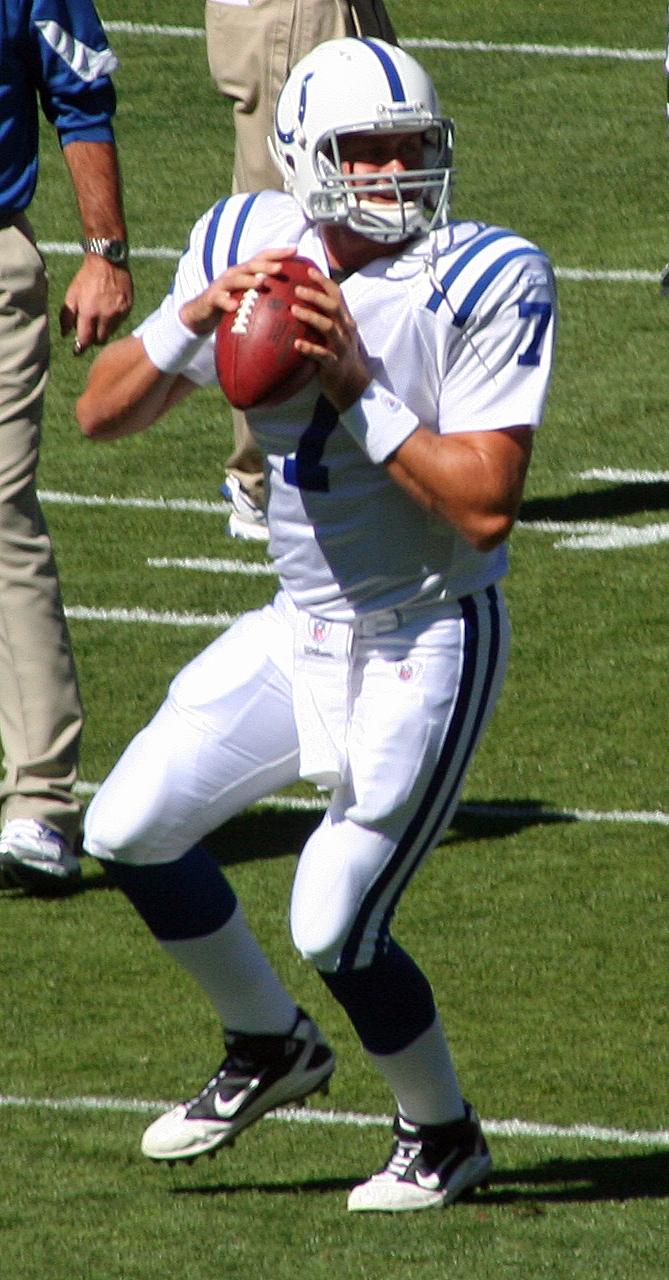
Curtis Painter started eight games in 2011.

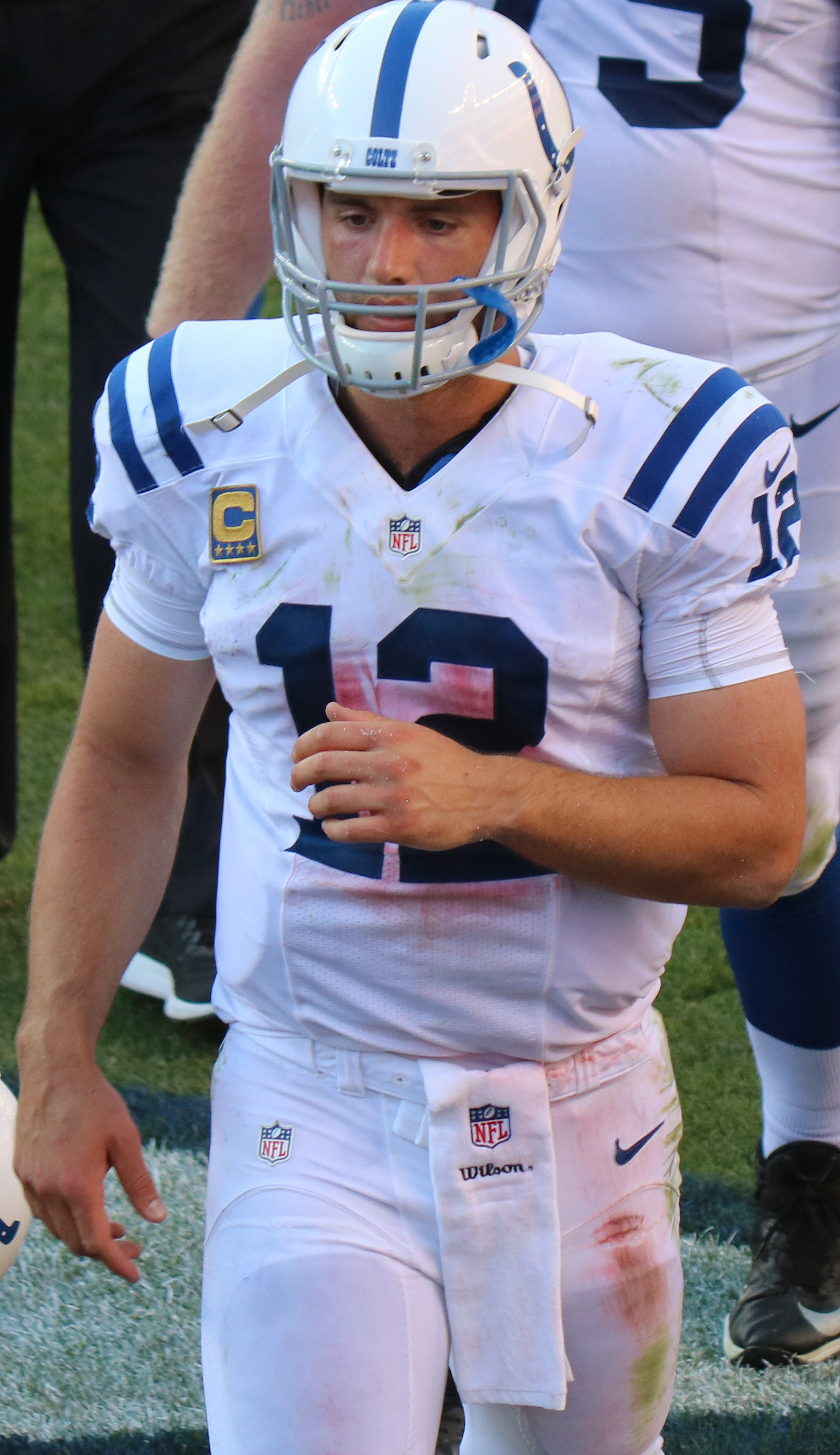
Andrew Luck was the starting quarterback for the Colts from 2012 to 2018.

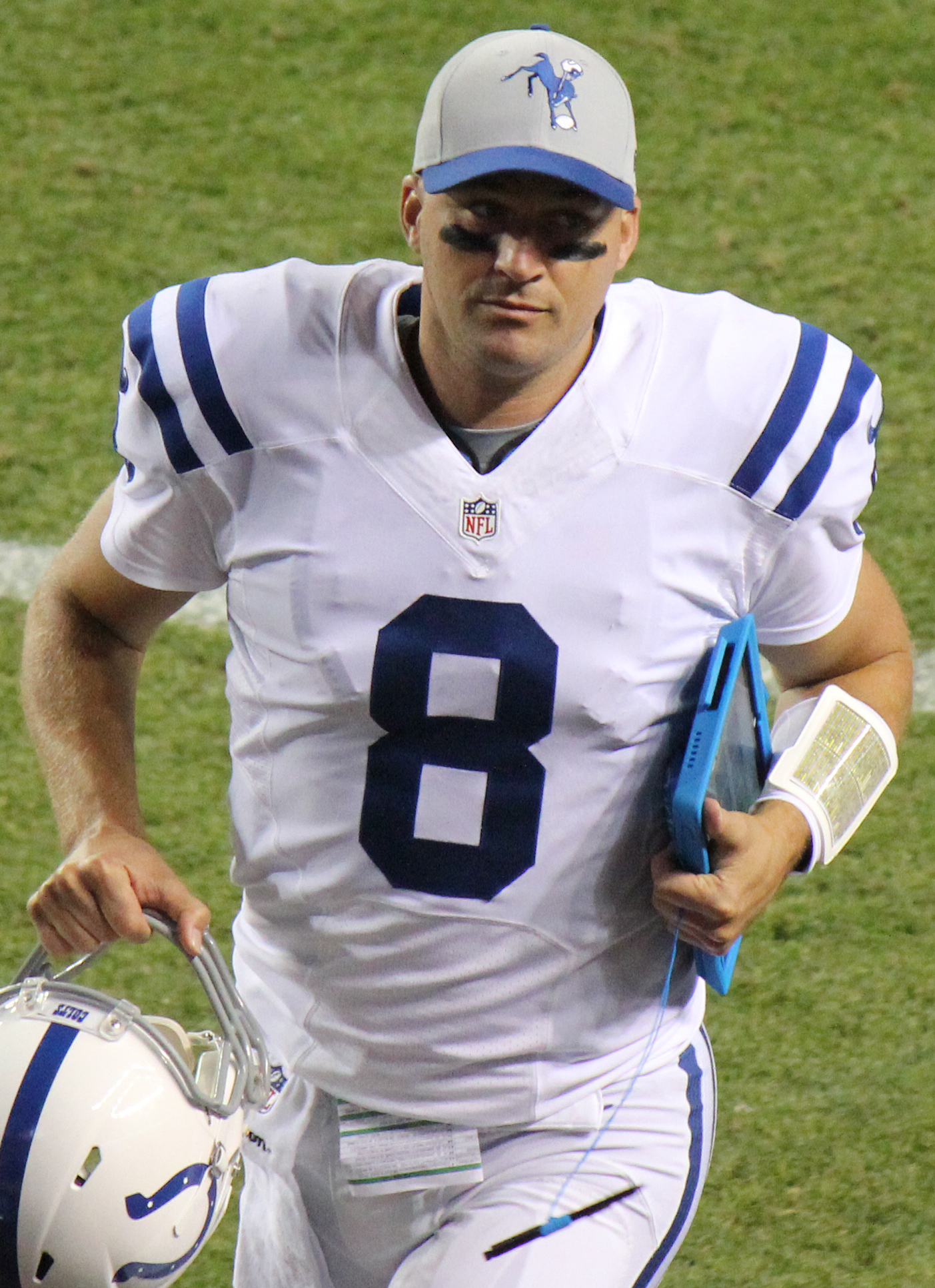
Matt Hasselbeck started eight games in 2015.

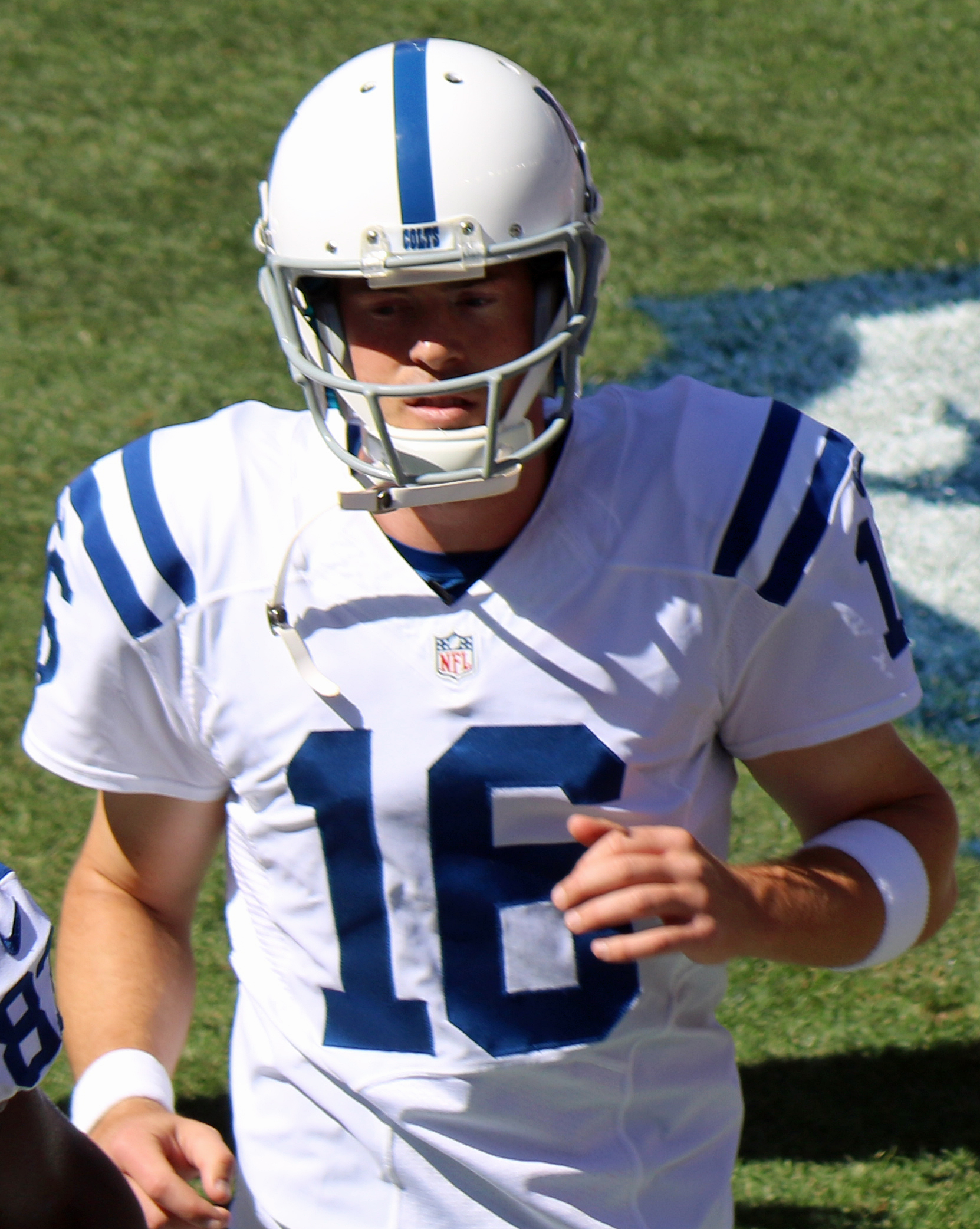
Scott Tolzien started one game each in 2016 and 2017 due to injuries to Luck.

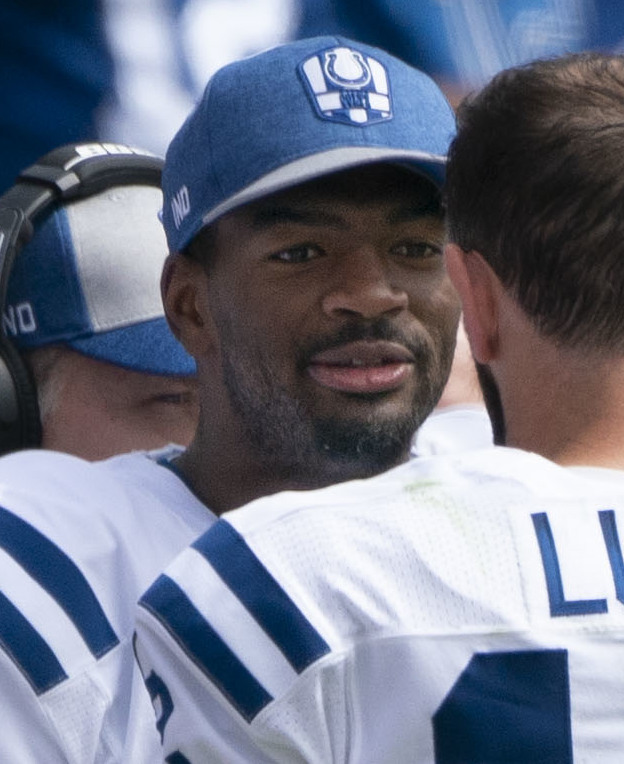
Jacoby Brissett started for the Colts during the 2017 and 2019 seasons.

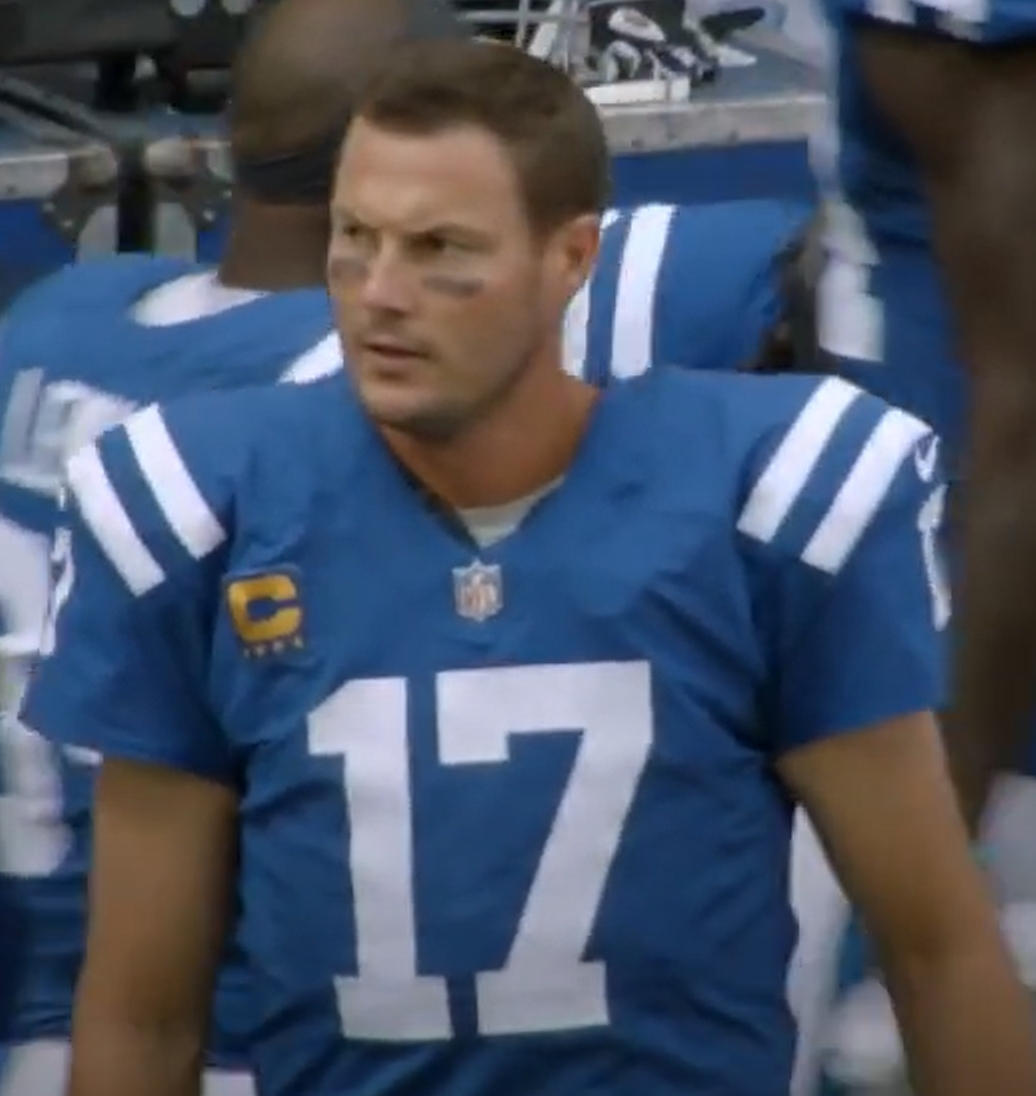
Philip Rivers was the starting quarterback for the Colts in 2020 and 2025.

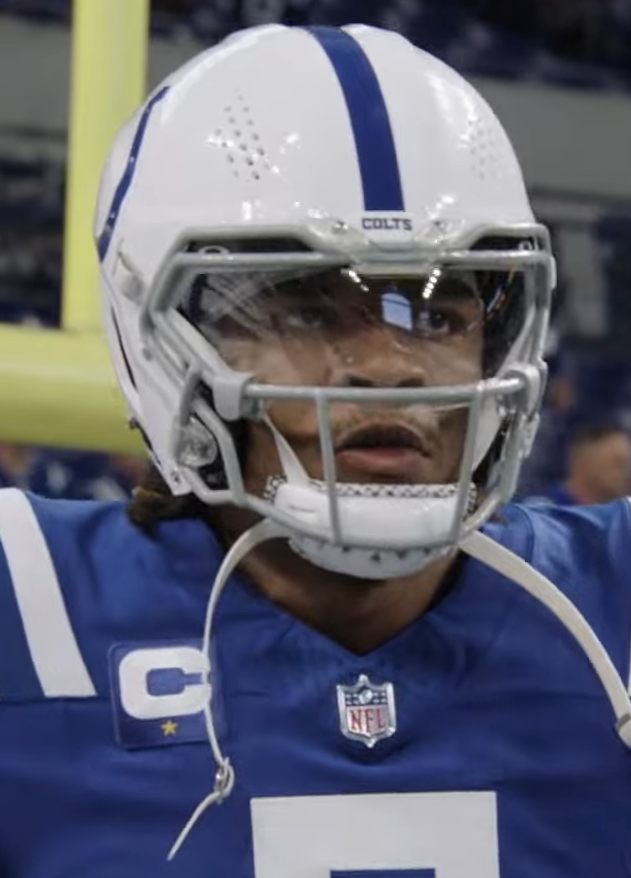
Anthony Richardson (2023–2024)

=== Regular season ===
Year	Column links to corresponding team season
(#)	Number of games started in the regular season
†	Inducted to the Pro Football Hall of Fame
+ ^{[b]}	MVP Award-winning season
*	Pro Bowl season
**	Season Currently in Progress (QB starts may not represent full-season)

Season	Quarterback(s) (games)	Ref(s)
Baltimore Colts (1953–1983)
1953	Fred Enke (8) / George Taliaferro (3) / Ed Mioduszewski (1)	
1954	Gary Kerkorian (10) / Fred Enke (1) / Cotton Davidson (1)	
1955	George Shaw (12)	
1956	Johnny Unitas^{†} (7) / George Shaw (5)	
1957	Johnny Unitas^{†*} (12)	
1958	Johnny Unitas^{†} ^{*}(10) / George Shaw (2)	
1959	Johnny Unitas^{†+*} (12)	
1960	Johnny Unitas^{†*} (12)	
1961^{[c]}	Johnny Unitas^{†*} (14)	
1962	Johnny Unitas^{†*} (14)	
1963	Johnny Unitas^{†*} (14)	
1964	Johnny Unitas^{†+*} (14)	
1965	Johnny Unitas^{†} (11) / Gary Cuozzo (2) / Tom Matte (1)	
1966	Johnny Unitas^{†*} (13) / Gary Cuozzo (1)	
1967	Johnny Unitas^{†+*} (14)	
1968	Earl Morrall^{+*} (14)	
1969	Johnny Unitas^{†} (12) / Earl Morrall (2)	
1970	Johnny Unitas^{†} (13) / Earl Morrall (1)	
1971	Earl Morrall (9) / Johnny Unitas^{†} (5)	
1972	Marty Domres (9) / Johnny Unitas^{†} (5)	
1973	Marty Domres (9) / Bert Jones (5)	
1974	Bert Jones (8) / Marty Domres (6)	
1975	Bert Jones (14)	
1976	Bert Jones^{+*} (14)	
1977	Bert Jones (14)	
1978^{[c]}	Bill Troup (11) / Bert Jones (3) / Mike Kirkland (2)	
1979	Greg Landry (12) / Bert Jones (4)	
1980	Bert Jones (15) / Greg Landry (1)	
1981	Bert Jones (15) / David Humm (1)	
1982^{[d]}	Mike Pagel (9)	
1983	Mike Pagel (15) / Mark Herrmann (1)	
Indianapolis Colts since 1984
1984	Mike Pagel (9) / Art Schlichter (5) / Mark Herrmann (2)	
1985	Mike Pagel (14) / Matt Kofler (1) / Art Schlichter (1)	
1986	Jack Trudeau (11) / Gary Hogeboom (5)	
1987^{[d]}	Jack Trudeau (8) / Gary Hogeboom (6) / Blair Kiel (1)	
1988	Chris Chandler (13) / Jack Trudeau (2) / Gary Hogeboom (1)	
1989	Jack Trudeau (12) / Chris Chandler (3) / Tom Ramsey (1)	
1990	Jeff George (12) / Jack Trudeau (4)	
1991	Jeff George (16)	
1992	Jeff George (10) / Jack Trudeau (5) / Mark Herrmann (1)	
1993	Jeff George (11) / Jack Trudeau (5)	
1994	Jim Harbaugh (9) / Don Majkowski (6) / Browning Nagle (1)	
1995	Jim Harbaugh^{*} (12) / Craig Erickson (3) / Paul Justin (1)	
1996	Jim Harbaugh (14) / Paul Justin (2)	
1997	Jim Harbaugh (11) / Paul Justin (4) / Kelly Holcomb (1)	
1998	Peyton Manning^{†} (16)	
1999	Peyton Manning^{†*} (16)	
2000	Peyton Manning^{†*} (16)	
2001	Peyton Manning^{†} (16)	
2002	Peyton Manning^{†*} (16)	
2003	Peyton Manning^{†+*} (16)	
2004	Peyton Manning^{†+*} (16)	
2005	Peyton Manning^{†*} (16)	
2006	Peyton Manning^{†*} (16)	
2007	Peyton Manning^{†*} (16)	
2008	Peyton Manning^{†+*} (16)	
2009	Peyton Manning^{†+*} (16)	
2010	Peyton Manning^{†*} (16)	
2011	Curtis Painter (8) / Dan Orlovsky (5) / Kerry Collins (3)	
2012	Andrew Luck^{*} (16)	
2013	Andrew Luck^{*} (16)	
2014	Andrew Luck^{*} (16)	
2015	Matt Hasselbeck (8) / Andrew Luck (7) / Josh Freeman (1)	
2016	Andrew Luck (15) / Scott Tolzien (1)	
2017	Jacoby Brissett (15) / Scott Tolzien (1)	
2018	Andrew Luck^{*} (16)	
2019	Jacoby Brissett (15) / Brian Hoyer (1)	
2020	Philip Rivers (16)	
2021	Carson Wentz (17)	
2022	Matt Ryan (12) / Sam Ehlinger (3) / Nick Foles (2)	
2023	Gardner Minshew (13) / Anthony Richardson (4)	
2024	Anthony Richardson (11) / Joe Flacco (6)	
2025	Daniel Jones (13) / Philip Rivers (3) / Riley Leonard (1)	
2026	Daniel Jones (11)	

=== Postseason ===
Year	Column links to corresponding team season
(#)	Postseason win–loss record
†	Inducted to the Pro Football Hall of Fame
+	NFL champions (1920–1969)
‡	Super Bowl champions
*	Conference champions

Season	Quarterback(s) (games)	Ref(s)
Baltimore Colts (1953–1983)
1958	Johnny Unitas^{†} ^{+*} (1–0)	
1959	Johnny Unitas^{†} ^{+*} (1–0)	
1964	Johnny Unitas^{†} ^{*} (0–1)	
1965	Tom Matte (0–1)	
1968	Earl Morrall ^{+*} (2–1)	
1970	Johnny Unitas^{†} ^{‡*} (3–0)	
1971	Johnny Unitas^{†} (1–1)	
1975	Bert Jones (0–1)	
1976	Bert Jones (0–1)	
1977	Bert Jones (0–1)	
Indianapolis Colts (1984–present)
1987	Jack Trudeau (0–1)	
1995	Jim Harbaugh (2–1)	
1996	Jim Harbaugh (0–1)	
1999	Peyton Manning (0–1)	
2000	Peyton Manning (0–1)	
2002	Peyton Manning (0–1)	
2003	Peyton Manning (2–1)	
2004	Peyton Manning (1–1)	
2005	Peyton Manning (0–1)	
2006	Peyton Manning ^{‡*} (4–0)	
2007	Peyton Manning (0–1)	
2008	Peyton Manning (0–1)	
2009	Peyton Manning ^{*} (2–1)	
2010	Peyton Manning (0–1)	
2012	Andrew Luck (0–1)	
2013	Andrew Luck (1–1)	
2014	Andrew Luck (2–1)	
2018	Andrew Luck (1–1)	
2020	Philip Rivers (0–1)	

== Statistics ==
Peyton Manning holds the record for the most starts as the Colts quarterback, as well as the most wins. Manning has also set franchise records in completions, passing attempts, completion percentage, passing yards, touchdowns and has the highest franchise passer rating while Johnny Unitas holds the record for most interceptions by a Colts quarterback. Manning has taken the most sacks of all the quarterbacks but Bert Jones has lost the most yards while being sacked. Jones also has the record for the longest completed pass by a Colts starting quarterback, with a 90-yard touchdown pass to wide receiver Roger Carr in a home win against the New York Jets in 1975.

Name	Name of the quarterback	Cmp%	Percentage of passes completed
GP	Games played (regular season)	Yds	Yards gained by passing
GS	Games started (regular season)	TD	Passing touchdowns
W	Number of wins as starting quarterback	Int	Interceptions thrown
L	Number of losses as starting quarterback	Lng	Longest completed pass thrown (yards)
T	Number of ties as starting quarterback	Sk	Number of times sacked
Cmp	Passes completed	Yds	Yards lost by sacks
Att	Passes attempted	Rate	Quarterback rating

Name	GP	GS	W	L	T	Cmp	Att	Cmp%	Yds	TD	Int	Lng	Sk	Yds	Rate
Peyton Manning	208	208	141	67	0	4682	7210	64.9	54828	399	198	86	231	1483	94.9
Johnny Unitas	206	182	117	61	4	2796	5110	54.7	39768	287	246	89	60	494	78.8
Bert Jones	98	92	46	46	0	1382	2464	56.1	17663	122	97	90	224	1948	78.8
Andrew Luck	86	86	53	33	0	2000	3290	60.8	23671	171	83	87	174	1124	89.5
Jim Harbaugh	53	46	20	26	0	746	1230	60.7	8705	49	26	85	130	737	86.6
Jeff George	52	49	14	35	0	874	1532	57.0	9551	41	46	75	146	1179	72.0
Mike Pagel	51	47	15	31	1	587	1154	50.9	7474	39	47	80	109	788	65.8
Jack Trudeau	61	47	18	29	0	812	1536	52.9	9647	41	62	84	92	657	64.4
Jacoby Brissett	46	30	11	19	0	552	928	59.5	6059	31	13	80	81	479	84.2
Earl Morrall	51	26	22	3	1	363	676	53.7	5666	47	40	84	32	283	80.3
Marty Domres	51	24	8	16	0	293	576	50.9	3471	21	31	66	42	312	59.3
Philip Rivers	19	19	11	8	0	427	635	67.2	4713	28	14	55	25	157	94.6
George Shaw	36	19	8	10	1	210	410	51.2	2820	21	31	82	0	0	59.0
Carson Wentz	17	17	9	8	0	322	516	62.4	3563	27	7	76	32	227	94.6
Chris Chandler	18	16	10	6	0	168	313	53.7	2156	10	15	82	21	145	66.2
Anthony Richardson	17	15	8	7	0	177	350	50.6	2400	11	13	69	21	144	67.8
Daniel Jones	15	15	8	7	0	302	446	67.7	3477	21	10	75	24	175	97.3
Gardner Minshew	16	13	7	6	0	305	490	62.2	3305	15	9	75	34	191	84.6
Greg Landry	43	13	3	10	0	308	533	57.8	3402	17	19	67	49	395	72.6
Gary Hogeboom	20	12	7	5	0	260	443	58.7	3295	22	18	72	38	295	81.6
Matt Ryan	12	12	4	7	1	308	460	67.0	3044	14	13	44	36	262	83.8
Bill Troup	40	11	3	8	0	162	316	51.3	1999	10	23	67	33	344	51.4
Gary Kerkorian	20	10	3	7	0	134	248	54.0	1783	11	15	78	0	0	66.6
Fred Enke	11	9	3	6	0	88	197	44.7	1225	8	18	55	0	0	40.7
Matt Hasselbeck	15	8	5	3	0	193	312	61.9	2121	11	6	57	18	108	85.7
Paul Justin	19	7	3	4	0	177	303	58.4	2097	7	7	44	20	166	77.7
Don Majkowski	12	6	3	3	0	97	176	55.1	1115	6	8	29	10	81	66.8
Joe Flacco	8	6	2	4	0	162	248	65.3	1761	12	7	65	18	123	90.5
Art Schlichter	13	6	0	6	0	91	202	45.0	1006	3	11	54	28	211	42.6
Mark Herrmann	11	4	2	2	0	74	136	54.4	928	2	13	74	15	132	41.2
Craig Erickson	6	3	2	1	0	50	83	60.2	586	3	4	39	10	68	73.7
Gary Cuozzo	28	3	1	2	0	105	208	50.5	1391	13	9	69	0	0	74.8
George Taliaferro	22	3	0	3	0	15	57	26.3	211	2	6	45	0	0	14.6
Sam Ehlinger	7	3	0	3	0	64	101	63.4	574	3	3	47	5	25	76.1
Scott Tolzien	4	2	0	2	0	32	55	58.2	344	1	4	32	7	50	52.4
Mike Kirkland	16	2	0	2	0	19	41	46.3	211	1	8	34	11	78	30.7
Nick Foles	3	2	0	2	0	25	42	59.5	224	0	4	49	8	48	34.3
Josh Freeman	1	1	1	0	0	15	28	53.6	149	1	1	57	1	7	65.9
Tom Matte	126	1	1	0	0	12	42	28.6	246	2	2	46	1	12	47.5
Browning Nagle	1	1	1	0	0	8	21	38.1	69	0	1	23	11	78	27.7
Blair Kiel	7	1	0	1	0	28	58	48.3	431	3	3	50	5	42	69.0
Riley Leonard	5	1	0	1	0	39	67	58.2	415	2	3	66	2	17	67.7
Brian Hoyer	4	1	0	1	0	35	65	53.8	372	4	4	23	5	47	65.7
Tom Ramsey	7	1	0	1	0	24	50	48.0	280	1	1	47	4	26	63.7
Matt Kofler	5	1	0	1	0	23	48	47.9	284	1	3	33	8	58	47.6
Kelly Holcomb	5	1	0	1	0	45	73	61.6	454	1	8	41	11	76	44.3
Ed Mioduszewski	12	1	0	1	0	11	30	36.7	113	2	2	17	0	0	42.8
David Humm	3	1	0	1	0	20	47	42.6	220	0	3	23	2	18	30.5
Cotton Davidson	24	1	0	1	0	28	66	42.4	309	0	6	29	0	0	19.1

== Notes ==
- ^{a} : In each game, a team picks one player to start in the quarterback (QB) position. Players may be substituted during the game, but the term "starting quarterback" refers to the player who started the game in that position.
- ^{b} : All Colts quarterbacks awarded the Associated Press National Football League Most Valuable Player Award (MVP) were also named to the Pro-Bowl in those same seasons.
- ^{c} : When the Colts entered the league in 1953 the Colts played a 12-game schedule. Starting in 1961 the NFL used a 14-game schedule, while since the 1978 NFL season all teams have played 16-game schedules.
- ^{d} : Strikes by the National Football League Players Association in the 1982 and 1987 seasons resulted in shortened seasons (9- and 15-game schedules, respectively).

== See also ==
- Lists of NFL starting quarterbacks
