= 1977 Baltimore Colts season =

23rd season in franchise history; final playoff appearance in Baltimore

- Owner: Robert Irsay
- General manager: Dick Szymanski
- Head coach: Ted Marchibroda
- Home stadium: Memorial Stadium

Results
- Record: 10–4
- Division place: T-1st AFC East
- Playoffs: Lost Divisional Playoffs (vs. Raiders) 31–37 (2OT)
- Pro Bowlers: T George Kunz; RB Lydell Mitchell; DT Mike Barnes; DE John Dutton; K Toni Linhart

The 1977 Baltimore Colts season was the 25th season for the team in the National Football League (NFL). Led by third-year head coach Ted Marchibroda, the Colts finished with 10 wins and 4 losses, tied for first in the AFC East division with the Miami Dolphins. The Colts had the tiebreaker over Miami based on better conference record (9–3 to 8–4), and the Dolphins missed the playoffs.

This was the final playoff appearance for the Colts as a Baltimore-based franchise. They would not make the playoffs again, or have a winning season, until ten years later in 1987, by which time the team moved to Indianapolis. As well, it would be the franchise's last playoff appearance in a non-strike year until 1995, and the team's last 10-win season until 1999, Peyton Manning's 2nd season. A Baltimore-based NFL team would not make the playoffs until the Ravens in 2000, winners of Super Bowl XXXV.

== Offseason ==
Colts' owner Robert Irsay fired general manager Joe Thomas in January 1977, due to a power struggle he was having with head coach Ted Marchibroda. The new general manager was former Colts center Dick Szymanski, who was the personnel director and a former scout.

=== NFL draft ===
1977 Baltimore Colts draft
| Round | Pick | Player | Position | College | Notes |
| 1 | 26 | Randy Burke | Wide receiver | Kentucky | |
| 2 | 53 | Mike Ozdowski | Defensive end | Virginia | |
| 6 | 168 | Calvin O'Neal | Linebacker | Michigan | Would play for the Colts in 1978. |
| 7 | 193 | Blanchard Carter | Offensive tackle | UNLV | Would play for the Tampa Bay Buccaneers |
| 8 | 220 | Ken Helms | Offensive tackle | Georgia | |
| 9 | 247 | Glen Capriola | Running back | Boston College | |
| 10 | 277 | Ron Baker | Guard | Oklahoma State | |
| 11 | 304 | Brian Ruff | Linebacker | The Citadel | |
| 12 | 331 | Bill Deutsch | Running back | North Dakota | |
Made roster

=== Undrafted free agents ===
1977 undrafted free agents of note
| Player | Position | College |
|---|---|---|
| Brian Sikorski | Quarterback | Villanova |

== Personnel ==
=== Staff ===
1977 Baltimore Colts staff
| Front office: President and Treasurer – Robert Irsay; General Manager – Dick Szymanski; Assistant General Manager – Ernie Accorsi; Head coaches: Head Coach – Ted Marchibroda; Offensive coaches: Receivers – Dick Bielski; Offensive Line – Whitey Dovell | Defensive coaches: Defensive Coordinator – Maxie Baughan; Defensive Line – Ed Khayat; Defensive Backfield – Frank Lauterbur; Special teams coaches: Special Teams – George Boutselis |

=== Roster ===
1977 Baltimore Colts roster
| Quarterbacks (QB): 7 Bert Jones; 15 Mike Kirkland; 12 Bill Troup; Running backs (RB): 48 Roosevelt Leaks; 34 Ron Lee; 23 Don McCauley; 26 Lydell Mitchell; Wide receivers (WR): 35 Glenn Doughty; 80 Marshall Johnson; 28 Howard Satterwhite; 86 Freddie Scott; 88 Ricky Thompson; Tight ends (TE): 83 Mack Alston; 87 Raymond Chester; 85 Jimmie Kennedy | Offensive linemen (OL): 50 Forrest Blue C; 69 Wade Griffin T; 62 Ken Huff G; 75 George Kunz T; 57 Ken Mendenhall C; 61 Robert Pratt G; 64 David Taylor T; 67 Bob Van Duyne G; Defensive linemen (DL): 63 Mike Barnes DT; 72 Fred Cook DE; 78 John Dutton DE; 76 Joe Ehrmann DT; 73 Ron Fernandes DE/DT; 74 Ken Novak DT | Linebackers (LB): 55 Dan Dickel MLB; 58 Derrel Luce OLB; 52 Tom MacLeod OLB; 54 Sanders Shiver OLB; 56 Ed Simonini MLB; 53 Stan White OLB; Defensive backs (DB): 47 Tim Baylor FS; 44 Lyle Blackwood FS; 40 Bruce Laird SS; 31 Nelson Munsey CB; 30 Doug Nettles CB; 25 Ray Oldham SS; 43 Norm Thompson CB; Special teams (ST): 49 David Lee P; 2 Toni Linhart K | Reserve: 60 Ron Baker G (IR); 84 Randy Burke WR (IR); 81 Roger Carr WR (IR); 66 Elmer Collett G (IR); 28 Perry Griggs WR (IR); 42 Lloyd Mumphord CB (IR); 51 Calvin O'Neal LB (IR); 71 Mike Ozdowski DE (IR); 27 Howard Stevens RB (IR); Rookies in italics |

== Regular season ==
=== Schedule ===
| Week | Date | Opponent | Result | Record | Venue | Attendance |
|---|---|---|---|---|---|---|
| 1 | September 18 | at Seattle Seahawks | **W** 29–14 | 1–0 | Kingdome | 58,991 |
| 2 | September 25 | at **New York Jets** | **W** 20–12 | 2–0 | Giants Stadium | 43,439 |
| 3 | October 2 | **Buffalo Bills** | **W** 17–14 | 3–0 | Memorial Stadium | 49,247 |
| 4 | October 9 | **Miami Dolphins** | **W** 45–28 | 4–0 | Memorial Stadium | 57,829 |
| 5 | October 16 | at Kansas City Chiefs | **W** 17–6 | 5–0 | Arrowhead Stadium | 63,076 |
| 6 | October 23 | at **New England Patriots** | **L** 3–17 | 5–1 | Schaefer Stadium | 60,958 |
| 7 | October 30 | Pittsburgh Steelers | **W** 31–21 | 6–1 | Memorial Stadium | 60,225 |
| 8 | November 7 | Washington Redskins | **W** 10–3 | 7–1 | Memorial Stadium | 57,740 |
| 9 | November 13 | at **Buffalo Bills** | **W** 31–13 | 8–1 | Rich Stadium | 39,444 |
| 10 | November 20 | New York Jets | **W** 33–12 | 9–1 | Memorial Stadium | 50,957 |
| 11 | November 27 | at Denver Broncos | **L** 13–27 | 9–2 | Mile High Stadium | 74,939 |
| 12 | December 5 | at **Miami Dolphins** | **L** 6–17 | 9–3 | Miami Orange Bowl | 68,977 |
| 13 | December 11 | Detroit Lions | **L** 10–13 | 9–4 | Memorial Stadium | 45,124 |
| 14 | December 18 | **New England Patriots** | **W** 30–24 | 10–4 | Memorial Stadium | 42,250 |
Note: Intra-division opponents are in **bold** text.

==== Week 1: at Seattle Seahawks ====
Week One: Seattle Seahawks vs. Baltimore Colts – Game summary

| Quarter | 1 | 2 | 3 | 4 | Total |
|---|---|---|---|---|---|
| **Colts** | 7 | 7 | 5 | 10 | **29** |
| Seahawks | 0 | 7 | 0 | 7 | **14** |

at Kingdome, Seattle

- Date: September 18
- Game time: 4:03 pm local/1:03 pm local
- Game weather: indoors
- Game attendance: 58,991
- Referee: Jim Tunney
- TV announcers (NBC): Stu Nahan and Floyd Little
- Gamebook

Game information

**First quarter**

- BAL – Don McCauley 6-yard run (Toni Linhart kick), 6:00 (BAL 7–0)

**Second quarter**

- SEA – Don Testerman 1-yard pass from Jim Zorn (John Leypoldt kick), 8:46 (Tied 7–7)
- BAL – Roosevelt Leaks 10-yard rush (Toni Linhart kick), 3:21 (BAL 14–7)

**Third quarter**

- BAL – Safety, Doug Nettles blocked punt out of end zone, 13:37 (BAL 16–7)
- BAL – Toni Linhart 38-yard field goal, 7:37 (BAL 19–7)

**Fourth quarter**

- BAL – Toni Linhart 42-yard field goal, 14:53 (BAL 22–7)
- SEA – Autry Beamon 17-yard blocked punt return (John Leypoldt kick), 9:32 (BAL 22–14)
- BAL – Roger Carr 21-yard pass from Bert Jones (Toni Linhart kick), 5:50 (BAL 29–14)

**Top passers**

- BAL – Bert Jones: 17/26, 220 yds, 1 TD
- SEA – Jim Zorn: 14/34, 164 yds, 1 TD, 4 INT

**Top rushers**

- BAL – Lydell Mitchell: 32 car, 114 yds
- SEA – Sherman Smith: 15 car, 58 yds

**Top receivers**

- BAL – Roger Carr: 2 rec, 66 yds, 1 TD
- SEA – Steve Largent: 4 rec, 73 yds

**Team** – pass – rush – total – to

- BAL – 220 – 206 – 426 – 1
- SEA – 151 – 104 – 255 – 4

==== Week 2 at Jets ====
Week Two: Baltimore Colts (1–0) at New York Jets (0–1)

| Quarter | 1 | 2 | 3 | 4 | Total |
|---|---|---|---|---|---|
| **Colts** | 7 | 7 | 6 | 0 | **20** |
| Jets | 0 | 3 | 0 | 9 | **12** |

at Giants Stadium, East Rutherford, New Jersey

- Date: September 25
- Game time: 1:00 p.m. EST
- Game weather: 55 °F or 12.8 °C
- Game attendance: 43,439

Game information

**First quarter**

- BAL – Roosevelt Leaks 6-yard run (Toni Linhart kick). Colts 7–0. Drive:

**Second quarter**

- BAL – Don McCauley 2-yard run (Toni Linhart kick). Colts 14–0. Drive:
- NYJ – Pat Leahy 25-yard field goal. Colts 14–3. Drive:

**Third quarter**

- BAL – Don McCauley 1-yard run (Toni Linhart kick). Colts 21–3. Drive:

**Fourth quarter**

- NYJ – Safety, David Lee ran out of end zone. Colts 21–5.
- NYJ – Charlie White 1-yard run (Pat Leahy kick). Colts 21–12. Drive:

Top passers

- BAL – Bert Jones – 9/15, 78 yards, INT
- NYJ – Richard Todd – 13/22, 140 yards, 2 INT

Top rushers

- BAL – Lydell Mitchell – 26 rushes, 68 yards
- NYJ – Charlie White – 12 rushes, 36 yards, TD

Top receivers

- BAL – Don McCauley – 5 receptions, 40 yards
- NYJ – Clark Gaines – 6 receptions, 47 yards

==== Week 3 ====
| Team | 1 | 2 | 3 | 4 | Total |
|---|---|---|---|---|---|
| Bills | 0 | 7 | 0 | 7 | 14 |
| • Colts | 0 | 10 | 0 | 7 | 17 |

- Date: October 2
- Location: Memorial Stadium
- Game weather: 72 °F or 22.2 °C, relative humidity 73%, wind 14 miles per hour (23 km/h; 12 kn)

==== Week 4 ====
| Team | 1 | 2 | 3 | 4 | Total |
|---|---|---|---|---|---|
| Dolphins | 14 | 14 | 0 | 0 | 28 |
| • Colts | 10 | 14 | 14 | 7 | 45 |

- Date: October 9
- Location: Memorial Stadium
- Game weather: 63 °F or 17.2 °C, relative humidity 82%, wind 13 miles per hour (21 km/h; 11 kn)
- Referee: Don Wedge

==== Week 5 ====
| Team | 1 | 2 | 3 | 4 | Total |
|---|---|---|---|---|---|
| • Colts | 14 | 0 | 3 | 0 | 17 |
| Chiefs | 0 | 6 | 0 | 0 | 6 |

- Date: October 16
- Location: Arrowhead Stadium
- Game weather: 46 °F or 7.8 °C, relative humidity 72%, wind 8 miles per hour (13 km/h; 7.0 kn)

==== Week 6 ====
| Team | 1 | 2 | 3 | 4 | Total |
|---|---|---|---|---|---|
| Colts | 0 | 0 | 3 | 0 | 3 |
| • Patriots | 7 | 0 | 10 | 0 | 17 |

- Date: October 23
- Location: Sullivan Stadium
- Game weather: 51 °F or 10.6 °C, relative humidity 45%, wind 15 miles per hour (24 km/h; 13 kn)

==== Week 7 ====
| Team | 1 | 2 | 3 | 4 | Total |
|---|---|---|---|---|---|
| Steelers | 0 | 0 | 7 | 14 | 21 |
| • Colts | 3 | 14 | 7 | 7 | 31 |

- Date: October 30
- Location: Memorial Stadium
- Game weather: 53 °F or 11.7 °C, relative humidity 54%, wind 8 miles per hour (13 km/h; 7.0 kn)
- Referee: Red Cashion

==== Week 8 ====
| Team | 1 | 2 | 3 | 4 | Total |
|---|---|---|---|---|---|
| Redskins | 0 | 3 | 0 | 0 | 3 |
| • Colts | 3 | 0 | 0 | 7 | 10 |

- Date: November 7
- Location: Memorial Stadium
- Game weather: 61 °F or 16.1 °C, relative humidity 93%, wind 16 miles per hour (26 km/h; 14 kn)
- Television network: ABC

==== Week 9 ====
| Team | 1 | 2 | 3 | 4 | Total |
|---|---|---|---|---|---|
| • Colts | 10 | 14 | 7 | 0 | 31 |
| Bills | 7 | 3 | 3 | 0 | 13 |

- Date: November 13
- Location: Rich Stadium
- Game weather: 29 °F or −1.7 °C, relative humidity 82%, wind 13 miles per hour (21 km/h; 11 kn), wind chill 18 °F or −7.8 °C
- Referee: Gordon McCarter

==== Week 10 ====
| Team | 1 | 2 | 3 | 4 | Total |
|---|---|---|---|---|---|
| Jets | 3 | 0 | 3 | 6 | 12 |
| • **Colts** | 6 | 13 | 7 | 7 | 33 |

- Date: November 20
- Location: Memorial Stadium
- Game start: 1:00 p.m. EST
- Game weather: 43 °F or 6.1 °C • Wind 6 mph (10 km/h; 5 kn)

Scoring summary
| 1 | NYJ | Pat Leahy 24-yard field goal | Jets 3–0 |
| 1 | BAL | Raymond Chester 53-yard pass from Bert Jones (kick failed) | Colts 6–3 |
| 2 | BAL | Toni Linhart 30-yard field goal | Colts 9–3 |
| 2 | BAL | Toni Linhart 31-yard field goal | Colts 12–3 |
| 2 | BAL | Glenn Doughty 33-yard pass from Bert Jones (Toni Linhart kick) | Colts 19–3 |
| 3 | NYJ | Pat Leahy 22-yard field goal | Colts 19–6 |
| 3 | BAL | Lydell Mitchell 28-yard pass from Bert Jones (Toni Linhart kick) | Colts 26–6 |
| 4 | NYJ | Jerome Barkum 18-yard pass from Matt Robinson (Pat Leahy kick) | Colts 26–12 |
| 4 | BAL | Robert Pratt 21-yard fumble return (Toni Linhart kick) | Colts 33–12 |

==== Week 11 ====
| Team | 1 | 2 | 3 | 4 | Total |
|---|---|---|---|---|---|
| Colts | 0 | 3 | 10 | 0 | 13 |
| • Broncos | 7 | 7 | 0 | 13 | 27 |

- Date: November 27
- Location: Mile High Stadium
- Game weather: 40 °F or 4.4 °C, relative humidity 48%, wind 15 miles per hour (24 km/h; 13 kn)
- Referee: Jim Tunney

==== Week 12 ====
| Team | 1 | 2 | 3 | 4 | Total |
|---|---|---|---|---|---|
| Colts | 6 | 0 | 0 | 0 | 6 |
| • Dolphins | 3 | 7 | 0 | 7 | 17 |

- Date: December 5
- Location: Orange Bowl
- Game weather: 79 °F or 26.1 °C, relative humidity 78%, wind 10 miles per hour (16 km/h; 8.7 kn)
- Television network: ABC

==== Week 13 ====
| Team | 1 | 2 | 3 | 4 | Total |
|---|---|---|---|---|---|
| • Lions | 0 | 3 | 0 | 10 | 13 |
| Colts | 0 | 0 | 3 | 7 | 10 |

- Date: December 11
- Location: Memorial Stadium
- Game weather: 22 °F or −5.6 °C, relative humidity 45%, wind 11 miles per hour (18 km/h; 9.6 kn), wind chill 11 °F or −11.7 °C
- Referee: Pat Haggerty
- TV announcers (CBS): Tim Ryan, Johnny Unitas

==== Week 14 ====
| Team | 1 | 2 | 3 | 4 | Total |
|---|---|---|---|---|---|
| Patriots | 0 | 14 | 10 | 0 | 24 |
| • Colts | 0 | 3 | 13 | 14 | 30 |

- Date: December 18
- Location: Memorial Stadium
- Game weather: 41 °F or 5 °C, relative humidity 81%, wind 15 miles per hour (24 km/h; 13 kn)
- Referee: Fred Silva

=== Standings ===
AFC East
| | W | L | T | PCT | DIV | CONF | PF | PA | STK |
|---|---|---|---|---|---|---|---|---|---|
| ^{(2)} Baltimore Colts | 10 | 4 | 0 | .714 | 6–2 | 9–3 | 295 | 221 | W1 |
| Miami Dolphins | 10 | 4 | 0 | .714 | 6–2 | 8–4 | 313 | 197 | W1 |
| New England Patriots | 9 | 5 | 0 | .643 | 4–4 | 7–5 | 278 | 217 | L1 |
| New York Jets | 3 | 11 | 0 | .214 | 2–6 | 2–10 | 191 | 300 | L2 |
| Buffalo Bills | 3 | 11 | 0 | .214 | 2–6 | 2–10 | 160 | 313 | L1 |

== Playoffs ==
Baltimore made it to the AFC playoffs as a No. 2 seed and hosted the defending Super Bowl champion Oakland Raiders in the divisional round. The Colts held a 31–28 lead with time running out, when the famous “Ghost to the Post” play to tight end Dave Casper advanced the Raiders to the Baltimore 14-yard line, where Errol Mann kicked the tying field goal to send the contest into overtime. After the first overtime went scoreless, Casper caught a 10-yard touchdown pass 43 seconds into the period to win the game for the Raiders.

| Round | Date | Opponent | Result | Record | Venue | Attendance |
|---|---|---|---|---|---|---|
| Divisional | December 24 | Oakland Raiders (4) | L 31–37^{2OT} | 0–1 | Memorial Stadium | 60,763 |

=== Divisional ===
| Team | 1 | 2 | 3 | 4 | OT | Total |
|---|---|---|---|---|---|---|
| • Raiders | 7 | 0 | 14 | 10 | 6 | 37 |
| Colts | 0 | 10 | 7 | 14 | 0 | 31 |

- Date:
  December 24
- Location: Memorial Stadium
- Game weather: 41 °F or 5 °C, relative humidity 56%, wind 9 miles per hour (14 km/h; 7.8 kn)
- Referee: Dick Jorgensen

== See also ==
- History of the Indianapolis Colts
- Indianapolis Colts seasons
- Colts–Patriots rivalry
