= 1978 Baltimore Colts season =

26th season in franchise history

- Owner: Robert Irsay
- General manager: Dick Szymanski
- Head coach: Ted Marchibroda
- Home stadium: Memorial Stadium

Results
- Record: 5–11
- Division place: T-4th AFC East
- Playoffs: Did not qualify
- Pro Bowlers: None

The 1978 Baltimore Colts season was the 26th season for the team in the National Football League (NFL). Under fourth-year head coach Ted Marchibroda, the Colts finished with 5 wins and 11 losses, tied for fourth in the AFC East division with the Buffalo Bills. Baltimore lost the tiebreaker to Buffalo based on head-to-head series (0–2). This was the first time under Marchibroda that Baltimore did not make the postseason.

The Colts' minus-181 point differential was easily the NFL's worst, 50 points behind the next worst team, the San Francisco 49ers.

With quarterback Bert Jones out for several weeks with a shoulder injury and quickly losing both starting offensive tackles for the year through injury, Baltimore started the season in catastrophic fashion, losing their first two games by a combined score of 80–0. The Colts' first win of the season, in week three over New England on Monday Night Football, is one of the biggest regular season upsets in NFL history. The Patriots were favored by an overwhelming 17½ points, but the Colts scored 27 points in the fourth quarter, including a 90-yard kickoff return by running back Joe Washington with under a minute left to take the lead for good. In the game, Washington became the first player to throw a touchdown, catch a pass for a touchdown, and return a kickoff for a touchdown in the same game.

== Offseason ==
=== NFL draft ===
1978 Baltimore Colts draft
Round	Pick	Player	Position	College	Notes
1	25	Reese McCall	Tight end	Auburn	
2	52	Mike Woods	Linebacker	Cincinnati	
Made roster * Made at least one Pro Bowl during career

=== Undrafted free agents ===
1978 undrafted free agents of note
Player	Position	College
Bill Banks	Linebacker	Penn State
Lou Bonato	Guard	Richmond
Ben Lazaro	Tackle	Villanova
Mike Sochko	Punter	Maryland
Dana Standefer	Quarterback	Franklin College
Henry White	Running back	Colgate

== Personnel ==
=== Staff ===
1978 Baltimore Colts staff
Front office: President and Treasurer – Robert Irsay; General Manager – Dick Szymanski; Assistant General Manager – Ernie Accorsi; Head coaches: Head Coach – Ted Marchibroda; Offensive coaches: Receivers – Dick Bielski; Offensive Line – Whitey Dovell	Defensive coaches: Defensive Coordinator – Maxie Baughan; Defensive Line – Ed Khayat; Defensive Backfield – Ralph Hawkins; Special teams coaches: Special Teams – George Boutselis

=== Roster ===
1978 Baltimore Colts roster
Quarterbacks (QB): 7 Bert Jones; 15 Mike Kirkland; 12 Bill Troup; Running backs (RB): 36 Don Hardeman; 48 Roosevelt Leaks; 34 Ron Lee; 23 Don McCauley; 20 Joe Washington; Wide receivers (WR): 84 Randy Burke; 81 Roger Carr; 35 Glenn Doughty; 80 Marshall Johnson; 45 Mike Siani; Tight ends (TE): 83 Mack Alston; 86 Reese McCall	Offensive linemen (OL): 60 Ron Baker G; 69 Wade Griffin T; 62 Ken Huff G; 57 Ken Mendenhall C; 79 Don Morrison T; 61 Robert Pratt G; 59 Geoff Reece C; 67 Bob Van Duyne T; Defensive linemen (DL): 72 Fred Cook DE; 78 John Dutton DE; 76 Joe Ehrmann DT; 66 Greg Marshall DT; 71 Mike Ozdowski DE; 74 Dave Rowe DT	Linebackers (LB): 58 Derrel Luce OLB; 52 Tom MacLeod OLB; 55 Stu O'Dell OLB; 51 Calvin O'Neal MLB; 54 Sanders Shiver OLB; 56 Ed Simonini MLB; 53 Stan White OLB; Defensive backs (DB): 47 Tim Baylor FS; 44 Lyle Blackwood FS; 28 Dwight Harrison CB; 40 Bruce Laird SS; 42 Lloyd Mumphord CB; 30 Doug Nettles CB; 43 Norm Thompson CB; Special teams (ST): 49 David Lee P; 2 Toni Linhart K	Reserve: 38 Monte Anthony RB (IR); 63 Mike Barnes DT (IR); 50 Forrest Blue C (IR); 21 Frank Dark CB (IR); 73 Ron Fernandes DE (IR); 75 George Kunz T (IR); 88 Herb Orvis DT (IR); 64 David Taylor T (IR); 59 Mike Woods LB (IR); Rookies in italics

== Regular season ==
=== Schedule ===
Week	Date	Opponent	Result	Record	Venue	Attendance
1	September 4	at Dallas Cowboys	**L** 0–38	0–1	Texas Stadium	64,224
2	September 10	**Miami Dolphins**	**L** 0–42	0–2	Memorial Stadium	47,730
3	September 18	at **New England Patriots**	**W** 34–27	1–2	Schaefer Stadium	57,284
4	September 24	at **Buffalo Bills**	**L** 17–24	1–3	Rich Stadium	55,270
5	October 1	Philadelphia Eagles	**L** 14–17	1–4	Memorial Stadium	50,314
6	October 8	at St. Louis Cardinals	**W** 30–17	2–4	Busch Memorial Stadium	47,479
7	October 15	**New York Jets**	**L** 10–33	2–5	Memorial Stadium	45,563
8	October 22	Denver Broncos	**W** 7–6	3–5	Memorial Stadium	54,057
9	October 29	at **Miami Dolphins**	**L** 8–26	3–6	Miami Orange Bowl	53,524
10	November 6	Washington Redskins	**W** 21–17	4–6	Memorial Stadium	57,631
11	November 12	at Seattle Seahawks	**W** 17–14	5–6	Kingdome	61,905
12	November 19	Cleveland Browns	**L** 24–45	5–7	Memorial Stadium	45,341
13	November 26	**New England Patriots**	**L** 14–35	5–8	Memorial Stadium	42,828
14	December 3	at **New York Jets**	**L** 16–24	5–9	Shea Stadium	50,248
15	December 9	at Pittsburgh Steelers	**L** 13–35	5–10	Three Rivers Stadium	41,957
16	December 17	**Buffalo Bills**	**L** 14–21	5–11	Memorial Stadium	25,415
Note: Intra-division opponents are in **bold** text.

=== Results ===
==== Week 3 ====
Week Three: Baltimore Colts (0–2) at New England Patriots (1–1)

Quarter	1	2	3	4	Total
**Colts**	0	7	0	27	**34**
Patriots	6	7	0	14	**27**

at Schaefer Stadium, Foxboro, Massachusetts

- Date: September 18
- Game time: 9:00 p.m. EST
- Game weather: 58 °F (14 °C)
- TV announcers (ABC): Frank Gifford, Howard Cosell and Don Meredith
- Pro-Football-Reference.com

Game information

**First quarter**

- NE – Andy Johnson 1-yard run (kick failed). Patriots 6–0. Drive:

**Second quarter**

- BAL – Don McCauley 3-yard run (Toni Linhart kick). Colts 7–6. Drive:
- NE – Stanley Morgan 62-yard pass from Steve Grogan (John Smith kick). Patriots 13–7. Drive:

**Fourth quarter**

- BAL – Roger Carr 54-yard pass from Joe Washington (Toni Linhart kick). Colts 14–13. Drive:
- BAL – Joe Washington 23-yard pass from Bill Troup (kick failed). Colts 20–13. Drive:
- BAL – Roger Carr 67-yard pass from Bill Troup (Toni Linhart kick). Colts 27–13. Drive:
- NE – Steve Grogan 4-yard run (John Smith kick), 3:17. Colts 27–20. **Drive: 11 plays, 60 yards.**
- NE – Sam Cunningham 1-yard run (John Smith kick), 1:33. Tie 27–27. Drive:
- BAL – Joe Washington 90-yard kickoff return (Toni Linhart kick). Colts 34–27.

Top passers

- BAL – Bill Troup – 10/15, 221 yards, 2 TD, INT
- NE – Steve Grogan – 11/33, 229 yards, TD, 3 INT

Top rushers

- BAL – Joe Washington – 16 rushes, 53 yards
- NE – Andy Johnson – 27 rushes, 109 yards, TD

Top receivers

- BAL – Roger Carr – 6 receptions, 187 yards, 2 TD
- NE – Stanley Morgan – 3 receptions, 125 yards, TD

=== Standings ===
1978 AFC East standings
	W	L	T	PCT	DIV	CONF	PF	PA	STK
^{(2)} New England Patriots	11	5	0	.688	6–2	9–3	358	286	L1
^{(4)} Miami Dolphins	11	5	0	.688	5–3	8–4	372	254	W3
New York Jets	8	8	0	.500	6–2	7–5	359	364	L2
Buffalo Bills	5	11	0	.313	2–6	4–10	302	354	W1
Baltimore Colts	5	11	0	.313	1–7	3–9	239	421	L5

== See also ==
- History of the Indianapolis Colts
- Indianapolis Colts seasons
- Colts–Patriots rivalry
