= 1979 Baltimore Colts season =

27th season in franchise history

- Owner: Robert Irsay
- General manager: Dick Szymanski
- Head coach: Ted Marchibroda
- Home stadium: Memorial Stadium

Results
- Record: 5–11
- Division place: 5th AFC East
- Playoffs: Did not qualify
- Pro Bowlers: RB Joe Washington

The 1979 Baltimore Colts season was the 27th season for the team in the National Football League (NFL). Under fifth-year head coach Ted Marchibroda, the Colts again finished with 5 wins and 11 losses, fifth in the AFC East division.

With persistent shoulder problems, quarterback Bert Jones was sidelined; replaced by veteran Greg Landry, the Colts continued to struggle. Marchibroda was fired after the season in late December, and succeeded by Mike McCormack.

== Offseason ==
=== NFL draft ===
1979 Baltimore Colts draft
Round	Pick	Player	Position	College	Notes
1	6	Barry Krauss	Linebacker	Alabama	
3	69	Kim Anderson	Safety	Arizona State	
5	115	Larry Braziel	Cornerback	USC	
6	150	Jim Moore	Tackle	Ohio State	
8	197	Steve Heimkreiter	Linebacker	Notre Dame	
8	207	Nesby Glasgow	Safety	Washington	
9	224	Russ Henderson	Punter	Virginia	
10	254	Steve Stephens	Tight end	Oklahoma State	
11	280	John Priestner	Linebacker	Western Ontario	
12	306	Charlie Green	Wide receiver	Kansas State	
Made roster * Made at least one Pro Bowl during career

=== Undrafted free agents ===
1978 undrafted free agents of note
Player	Position	College
Dwayne Berry	Linebacker	Cincinnati
Robert Salla	Safety	Temple
Jack Shrawder	Defensive tackle	East Stroudsburg State

== Personnel ==
=== Staff ===
1979 Baltimore Colts staff
Front office: President and Treasurer – Robert Irsay; General Manager – Dick Szymanski; Assistant General Manager – Ernie Accorsi; Head coaches: Head Coach – Ted Marchibroda; Offensive coaches: Receivers – Dick Bielski; Offensive Line – Ernie Zwahlen	Defensive coaches: Defensive Coordinator – Maxie Baughan; Defensive Line – Ed Khayat; Defensive Backfield – John Symank; Special teams coaches: Special Teams – George Boutselis

=== Roster ===
1979 Baltimore Colts roster
Quarterbacks (QB): 12 Jerry Golsteyn; 7 Bert Jones; 11 Greg Landry; Running backs (RB): 38 Cleveland Franklin; 29 Ben Garry; 36 Don Hardeman; 48 Roosevelt Leaks; 23 Don McCauley; 20 Joe Washington; Wide receivers (WR): 84 Randy Burke; 81 Roger Carr; 87 Brian DeRoo; 35 Glenn Doughty; 45 Mike Siani; Tight ends (TE): 83 Mack Alston; 86 Reese McCall	Offensive linemen (OL): 60 Ron Baker G; 69 Wade Griffin T; 52 Lee Gross C; 68 Jeff Hart T; 62 Ken Huff G; 57 Ken Mendenhall C; 61 Robert Pratt G; 67 Bob Van Duyne T; Defensive linemen (DL): 63 Mike Barnes DT; 72 Fred Cook DE; 76 Joe Ehrmann DT; 79 Greg Fields DE; 90 Jim Krahl DT; 88 Herb Orvis DT	Linebackers (LB): 55 Barry Krauss MLB; 54 Sanders Shiver OLB; 56 Ed Simonini MLB; 53 Stan White OLB; 59 Mike Woods OLB; 58 Steve Zabel OLB; Defensive backs (DB): 44 Lyle Blackwood FS; 47 Larry Braziel CB; 25 Nesby Glasgow FS; 40 Bruce Laird SS; 30 Doug Nettles CB; 37 Reggie Pinkney SS; 43 Norm Thompson CB; Special teams (ST): 10 Bucky Dilts P; 5 Steve Mike-Mayer K	Reserve: 73 Ron Fernandes DE (IR); 51 Steve Heimkreiter LB (IR); 75 George Kunz T (IR); 34 Ron Lee RB (IR); 65 Jimmy Moore T (Left squad); 51 Mike Ozdowski DE (IR); 50 John Priestner LB (IR); 64 David Taylor T (Ret.); Rookies in italics

== Regular season ==
=== Schedule ===
Week	Date	Opponent	Result	Record	Venue	Attendance
1	September 2	at Kansas City Chiefs	**L** 0–14	0–1	Arrowhead Stadium	50,442
2	September 9	Tampa Bay Buccaneers	**L** 26–29 (OT)	0–2	Memorial Stadium	36,374
3	September 16	at Cleveland Browns	**L** 10–13	0–3	Cleveland Stadium	72,070
4	September 23	at Pittsburgh Steelers	**L** 13–17	0–4	Three Rivers Stadium	49,483
5	September 30	**Buffalo Bills**	**L** 13–31	0–5	Memorial Stadium	31,904
6	October 7	**New York Jets**	**W** 10–8	1–5	Memorial Stadium	32,142
7	October 14	Houston Oilers	**L** 16–28	1–6	Memorial Stadium	45,021
8	October 21	at **Buffalo Bills**	**W** 14–13	2–6	Rich Stadium	50,581
9	October 28	**New England Patriots**	**W** 31–26	3–6	Memorial Stadium	41,029
10	November 4	Cincinnati Bengals	**W** 38–28	4–6	Memorial Stadium	37,740
11	November 11	at **Miami Dolphins**	**L** 0–19	4–7	Miami Orange Bowl	50,193
12	November 18	at **New England Patriots**	**L** 21–50	4–8	Schaefer Stadium	60,879
13	November 25	**Miami Dolphins**	**L** 24–28	4–9	Memorial Stadium	38,016
14	December 2	at **New York Jets**	**L** 17–30	4–10	Shea Stadium	47,744
15	December 9	Kansas City Chiefs	**L** 7–10	4–11	Memorial Stadium	25,684
16	December 16	at New York Giants	**W** 31–7	5–11	Giants Stadium	58,711
Note: Intra-division opponents are in **bold** text.

=== Standings ===
AFC East
	W	L	T	PCT	DIV	CONF	PF	PA	STK
^{(3)} Miami Dolphins	10	6	0	.625	5–3	6–6	341	257	L1
New England Patriots	9	7	0	.563	4–4	6–6	411	326	W1
New York Jets	8	8	0	.500	4–4	5–7	337	383	W3
Buffalo Bills	7	9	0	.438	4–4	5–7	268	279	L3
Baltimore Colts	5	11	0	.313	3–5	4–10	271	351	W1

== See also ==
- History of the Indianapolis Colts
- Indianapolis Colts seasons
- Colts–Patriots rivalry
