= Randall Burke =

Randall Burke may refer to:

- Randy Burke (1955–2025), American football player
- Randall Burke, a character in Burn Notice
