= Ghost to the Post =

Significant play involving the Oakland Raiders and the Baltimore Colts

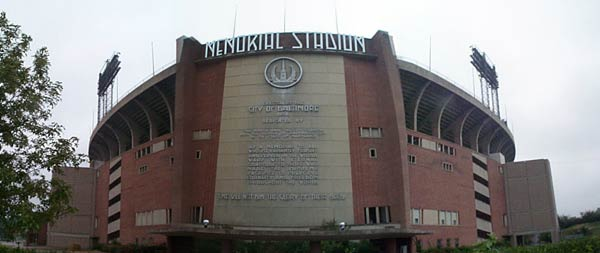
- Memorial Stadium, site of the game
Oakland Raiders (4) (11–3)	Baltimore Colts (2) (10–4)
37	31
Head coach: John Madden	Head coach: Ted Marchibroda
	1	2	3	4	OT	2OT	Total
OAK	7	0	14	10	0	6	37
BAL	0	10	7	14	0	0	31
- Date: December 24, 1977
- Stadium: Memorial Stadium; Baltimore, Maryland
- Referee: Dick Jorgensen
- Attendance: 59,925

TV in the United States
- Network: NBC
- Announcers: Curt Gowdy and John Brodie

Ghost to the Post is a significant play in NFL history. It refers to a 42-yard pass from Ken Stabler to Dave Casper, nicknamed "The Ghost" after Casper the Friendly Ghost, that set up a game-tying field goal in the final seconds of regulation in a double-overtime AFC divisional playoff game played between Casper's Oakland Raiders and the then-Baltimore Colts on December 24, 1977. Casper also caught the last pass of the game, a 10-yard touchdown pass. The game is currently the fifth-longest in NFL history, and has become synonymous with the play that made it famous.

== Game synopsis ==
The first half was mostly a defensive struggle. Oakland scored first on a 30-yard run by Clarence Davis. Baltimore returned with two second quarter scores, a 62-yard Bruce Laird interception return for a touchdown and a 36-yard field goal by Toni Linhart. The halftime score was 10–7 in favor of Baltimore.

The second half began with a scoring flurry. Dave Casper scored on an 8-yard touchdown reception on Oakland's first drive of the half. Marshall Johnson of the Colts then returned the ensuing kickoff 87 yards for a matching touchdown. Ted Hendricks blocked a third-quarter Baltimore punt, setting up a 10-yard Stabler-to-Casper touchdown pass, which made the score 21–17 in favor of the Raiders.

The fourth quarter saw impressive comebacks by both teams. Ron Lee scored on a 1-yard fourth down plunge for Baltimore, making the score 24–21 in favor of Baltimore. Oakland returned with a long drive culminating in a 1-yard Pete Banaszak run for a touchdown, making the score 28–24 in favor of Oakland. Baltimore returned with a 13-yard Lee run that left them with a 31–28 lead with just under 8 minutes to go, setting up the memorable play for Casper.

With 2:55 left on the clock in the 4th quarter, prior to taking possession of the ball following a Baltimore punt, Madden excitedly spoke on the sidelines with his quarterback. Stabler calmly looked at the frenzied Baltimore crowd and remarked "the fans are sure getting their money's worth today." Stabler connected with Clarence Davis for a first-down at the Raiders' 44-yard line. Following an incomplete pass on the next play, and with 2:17 remaining, Raiders' offensive coordinator Tom Flores called for a 2nd down pass designed to go to one of the two wide receivers running "in" patterns, but told Stabler to "take a peek at the Ghost to the post", referring to a deep pattern by Casper down the field and then angling to the goal post. On NFL's Greatest Games, Madden explained Casper's job on the play was normally to draw away the opposing team's safeties so the receivers could make a catch, but Flores had noticed the safeties had been playing closer to the line of scrimmage than usual, which is what prompted Flores to tell Stabler to look for Casper downfield. Casper himself claimed that although it was one of the team's most effective plays, he did not recall ever catching a pass on it all season.

In what football fans now refer to as "The Ghost to the Post", Casper ran a deep post pattern, and Stabler threw a high, arching pass that looked well over thrown and behind Casper. It was Casper's memorable change of direction, chase, and athletic over-the-head catch that became the signature moment for the game. Casper went down at the 14 yard line, setting up an Errol Mann field goal, with 29 seconds left, that tied the game and sent the game to overtime.

Just 43 seconds into the second overtime, Stabler hit Casper on another 10-yard touchdown pass that ended what was then the third-longest game in NFL history 37–31.

== Officials ==
- Referee: Dick Jorgensen (#60)
- Umpire: Al Conway (#27)
- Head linesman: Walt Peters (#44)
- Line judge: Jack Fette (#39)
- Back judge: Pat Knight (#73)
- Field judge: Bill O'Brien (#83)

== Significance of the game ==
To this date, the game is still the fifth-longest in pro football history. The game marked the last playoff appearance for the Baltimore-based Colts. The Raiders (the defending Super Bowl champion) would go on to lose the AFC Championship Game that year to the Broncos 20–17. NFL Films has released a film of the game as one of the most memorable in NFL history. Hall of Fame coach John Madden has called the moment one of the most memorable of his coaching career. Dave Casper has been named one of the best Tight Ends in NFL History and is a member of the Pro Football Hall of Fame, and this catch is cited as the most memorable in his career.
