= Don McCauley =

American football player (born 1949)

- Don McCauley in 1972

No. 23
- Position: Running back

Personal information
- Born: May 12, 1949 (age 77); Worcester, Massachusetts, U.S.
- Listed height: 6 ft 1 in (1.85 m)
- Listed weight: 211 lb (96 kg)

Career information
- High school: Garden City (Garden City, New York)
- College: North Carolina (1967–1970)
- NFL draft: 1971: 1st round, 22nd overall pick

Career history
- Baltimore Colts (1971–1981)

Awards and highlights
- Consensus All-America (1970); 2× ACC Player of the Year (1969, 1970); 2× First-team All-ACC (1969, 1970); North Carolina Tar Heels Jersey No. 23 honored

Career NFL statistics
- Rushing attempts: 770
- Rushing yards: 2,627
- Rushing touchdowns: 40
- Receptions: 333
- Receiving yards: 3,026
- Receiving touchdowns: 17
- Stats at Pro Football Reference
- College Football Hall of Fame

Donald Frederick McCauley Jr. (born May 12, 1949) is an American former professional football player who was a running back for the Baltimore Colts of the National Football League (NFL). He played college football for the North Carolina Tarheels from 1968 to 1970, during which time he was twice recognized as the Atlantic Coast Conference (ACC) player of the year. He was also consensus All-American in 1970 and finished ninth in voting for the Heisman Trophy.

Selected in the first round of the 1971 NFL draft, McCauley went on to have an 11-year NFL career with the Colts.

In 2001, McCauley was inducted into the College Football Hall of Fame.

== Early life ==
McCauley attended Garden City High School in Garden City, New York, where he was a power-hitting catcher on the baseball team, and powerful halfback on the football squad. His football skills earned him a full-ride scholarship to the University of North Carolina at Chapel Hill. Don is part of the McCauley family of Chapel Hill, North Carolina. Matthew McCauley (1750–1832), Don's great-grandfather, moved from Carrickfergus, County Antrim, Ireland, to Orange County, N.C., prior to the American Revolution and served in the 10th North Carolina Regiment of the Continental Army. Matthew McCauley and his brother William donated 250 acres towards the establishment of the University of North Carolina.

== College career ==
McCauley arrived at Chapel Hill in the fall of 1967. Under NCAA rules at the time, he spent the first year on the freshman team. Moved to the varsity squad in 1968, McCauley made an impression at spring practice.

=== 1968 ===
McCauley played in ten games for UNC during the 1968 season, primarily in a reserve role, gaining 360 yards on the ground, 313 yards through the air, and scoring three touchdowns.

=== 1969 ===
As a junior, McCauley began to make his mark as a premier Division I collegiate running back. In 10 games that year he gained 1,092 yards rushing, 238 yards receiving, and scored ten touchdowns. In the 23-3 win against Wake Forest that year, McCauley had 188 yards rushing, a mark that set a new UNC record for yards gained carrying the ball. After watching McCauley's big game against Wake Forest, UNC running back legend Charlie "Choo Choo" Justice anointed him "one of the best backs ever to wear a Carolina uniform." His 1,092 yards rushing would be the second most in ACC history and win McCauley the first of two ACC Player of the Year honors.

=== 1970 ===
In McCauley's senior season he led the nation in rushing with 1,720 yards, and all-purpose running with 2,021 yards. His 1,720 yards rushing broke the NCAA record held by O. J. Simpson and continued to stand the test of time half a century later, still ranking as the fifth highest total in ACC history and the highest at North Carolina. A consensus All-America selection and team captain his senior year, McCauley led the ACC in scoring in 1970 with 21 touchdowns. Over the course of his three years on the Tarheel varsity team, McCauley generated 3,172 rushing yards, 786 yards receiving, and 1,056 yards on kick returns — for a total of 5,014 all-purpose yards. He also led the team in punting with 48 punts for 1,845 yards — a 38.4 yard average. McCauley was a two-time First-team All-Conference selection, two-time Conference Player of the Year, and won the 1971 ACC Athlete of the Year award. He finished 9th in balloting for the 1970 Heisman Trophy, including 6 first place votes.

== Professional career ==
With the acquisition of the Miami Dolphins' first round draft pick, awarded to them as compensation for tampering in the hiring of then head coach of the Colts, Don Shula, Baltimore selected McCauley in the first round (22nd overall) in the 1971 NFL draft.

The 1971 NFL season was spent as a reserve to veteran halfback Tom Matte. He carried the ball 58 times for 246 yards (4.2 yards per carry) and scored 2 touchdowns during that rookie campaign. He also handled the ball periodically as a kickoff returner, bringing back 8 kicks with a 24.3 yard average. With Matte injured, McCauley was thrust into the limelight as a starter in the AFC Championship Game, in which he gained 50 yards on the ground and caught 2 passes for 24 more yards in a 21–0 loss to the Miami Dolphins.

McCauley's second pro season, 1972, was his best offensive year, in which he gained 675 yards on the ground — the most he would ever record — and another 256 in the air, logging a total of five touchdowns. One of his touchdowns came via a 93-yard kickoff return against the New York Jets in September, the longest scoring play of his career.

His third season, 1973, would be the last time he broke the 500-yard mark on the ground, with McCauley generating 514 yards on 144 carries (3.6 yards per carry average) in 13 games.

McCauley generated no fewer than 296 yards via pass receptions in any of his last six years, snagging more than fifty balls in a season twice. His high total as a pass-catcher would come in 1979, when he grabbed 55 balls for 575 yards (10.5 yards per catch average).

Don McCauley would actually finish his NFL career with more yards as a pass receiver (3,026) than as a runner (2,627).

McCauley was able to carve out a niche as an effective short-yardage back for the Colts over an 11-season career. He finished his career with 156 games played, during which he ran the ball 770 times for 2,627 yards — an average of 3.4 yards per carry.

Don McCauley scored 58 touchdowns during the course of his NFL career. He retired sixth all-time for the Colts in yards gained rushing.

== Life after football ==
Out of the game at the age of 33, McCauley retired to Huntington Bay, New York with his wife Tracey and three daughters- Krystin, Brooke and Brittney.

In 2001, Don McCauley was inducted into the College Football Hall of Fame.

== NFL career statistics ==
Legend
**Bold**	Career high

=== Regular season ===
Year	Team	Games		Rushing					Receiving				
Year	Team	GP	GS	Att	Yds	Avg	Lng	TD	Rec	Yds	Avg	Lng	TD
1971	BAL	13	0	58	246	**4.2**	19	2	3	6	2.0	8	0
1972	BAL	14	10	**178**	**675**	3.8	**36**	2	30	256	8.5	34	2
1973	BAL	13	**12**	144	514	3.6	24	2	25	186	7.4	34	0
1974	BAL	13	0	30	90	3.0	15	0	17	112	6.6	14	1
1975	BAL	14	0	60	196	3.3	18	**10**	14	93	6.6	32	1
1976	BAL	13	1	69	227	3.3	16	9	34	347	10.2	**44**	2
1977	BAL	14	0	83	234	2.8	16	6	51	495	9.7	34	2
1978	BAL	15	1	44	107	2.4	10	5	34	296	8.7	21	0
1979	BAL	15	1	59	168	2.8	13	3	**55**	**575**	**10.5**	35	3
1980	BAL	**16**	0	35	133	3.8	12	1	34	313	9.2	19	**4**
1981	BAL	**16**	0	10	37	3.7	8	0	36	347	9.6	31	2
		156	25	770	2,627	3.4	36	40	333	3,026	9.1	44	17

=== Playoffs ===
Year	Team	Games		Rushing					Receiving				
Year	Team	GP	GS	Att	Yds	Avg	Lng	TD	Rec	Yds	Avg	Lng	TD
1971	BAL	**2**	**1**	**18**	**59**	3.3	8	0	**2**	**24**	**12.0**	**16**	0
1975	BAL	1	0	3	3	1.0	2	0	1	9	9.0	9	0
1976	BAL	1	0	1	1	1.0	1	0	0	0	0.0	0	0
1977	BAL	1	0	2	9	**4.5**	**9**	0	**2**	11	5.5	12	0
		5	1	24	72	3.0	9	0	5	44	8.8	16	0
