= 1977 Oakland Raiders season =

NFL team season

- Owner: Al Davis
- General manager: Al Davis
- Head coach: John Madden
- Home stadium: Oakland–Alameda County Coliseum

Results
- Record: 11–3
- Division place: 2nd AFC West
- Playoffs: Won Divisional Playoffs (at Colts) 37–31 (2OT); Lost AFC Championship (at Broncos) 17–20

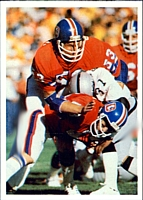
The Raiders playing the Broncos in the 1977-78 AFC Championship Game.

The 1977 Oakland Raiders season was the team's 18th season overall, and 8th season since joining the NFL. The Raiders entered the season as the defending Super Bowl champions. The team could not match its 13–1 record from 1976 and finished 11–3, which was only good enough for second place in the AFC West next to the Denver Broncos, who won 12 games (the two split victories over each other in the regular season).

The Raiders reached the AFC Championship Game for the fifth consecutive season, and their sixth in eight years. They lost the AFC Championship, however, to the division rival Denver Broncos. This marked the seventh time in ten seasons that the Raiders' season ended one game short of the Super Bowl. They did not return to the AFC Championship for the next two seasons.

The 1977 Raiders set a professional football record with 681 rushing attempts. Fullback Mark van Eeghen 324 times for 1273 yards, and running back Clarence Davis ran 194 times for 787 yards.

== Offseason ==
=== NFL draft ===
1977 Oakland Raiders Draft
Round	Selection	Player	Position	College
2	35	Mike Davis	DB	Colorado
2	56	Ted McKnight	RB	Minnesota-Duluth
4	112	Mickey Marvin	OG	Tennessee
5	126	Lester Hayes	DB	Texas A&M
5	139	Jeff Barnes	LB	California
7	190	Rich Martini	WR	California-Davis
8	223	Terry Robiskie	RB	Louisiana State
12	317	Rod Martin	LB	Southern California
12	334	Rolf Benirschke	PK	California-Davis

== Personnel ==
=== Staff / Coaches ===
1977 Oakland Raiders staff
Front office: Principal Owner/General Manager - Al Davis; Minority Co-Owner - Ed McGah; President of the General Partner / General Manager – Al Davis; Senior Executive – John Herrera; Scout/ Executive assistant, Personnel Director - Ken Herock; Executive Assistant / Scout - Al LoCasale; Head coaches: Head Coach – John Madden; Assistant Head Coach / Executive Assistant - Tom Flores; Offensive coaches: Offensive Backs – Lew Erber; Receivers Coach – Tom Flores; Offensive line – Ollie Spencer; Offensive Assistant - Joe Madro	Defensive coaches: Defensive Line – Tom Dahms; Linebackers – Don Shinnick; Defensive Backfield – Bob Zeman; Special teams coaches: Special Teams Coach – Joe Scannella

=== Roster ===
1977 Oakland Raiders roster
Quarterbacks (QB): 11 David Humm; 15 Mike Rae; 12 Ken Stabler; Running backs (RB): 40 Pete Banaszak; 28 Clarence Davis; 31 Carl Garrett; 29 Hubert Ginn; 35 Terry Robiskie; 30 Mark van Eeghen; Wide receivers (WR): 25 Fred Biletnikoff; 81 Morris Bradshaw; 21 Cliff Branch; 49 Mike Siani; Tight ends (TE): 46 Warren Bankston; 87 Dave Casper; 88 Ted Kwalick	Offensive linemen (OL): 64 George Buehler G; 50 Dave Dalby C; 70 Henry Lawrence T; 65 Mickey Marvin G; 78 Art Shell T; 66 Steve Sylvester C/G; 63 Gene Upshaw G; 75 John Vella T; Defensive linemen (DL): 72 John Matuszak DE; 76 Mike McCoy NT; 74 Dave Rowe NT; 60 Otis Sistrunk DE; 67 Pat Toomay DE	Linebackers (LB): 56 Jeff Barnes OLB; 39 Willie Hall ILB; 83 Ted Hendricks OLB; 58 Monte Johnson ILB; 53 Rod Martin ILB; 57 Randy McClanahan ILB; 52 Floyd Rice OLB; Defensive backs (DB): 24 Willie Brown CB; 20 Neal Colzie SS; 37 Lester Hayes CB; 42 Steve Jackson FS; 32 Jack Tatum FS; 26 Skip Thomas CB; 22 Jimmy Warren SS; Special teams (ST): 8 Ray Guy P; 14 Errol Mann K	Reserve: 43 George Atkinson S (IR); 36 Mike Davis S (IR); 34 Terry Kunz RB (IR); -- Everett Little G (IR); 89 Rich Martini WR (IR); 47 Charlie Phillips S (IR); 77 Charles Philyaw DE (IR); 41 Phil Villapiano LB (IR); Rookies in italics

== Regular season ==
=== Schedule ===
Week	Date	Opponent	Result	Record	Venue	Attendance
1	September 18	**San Diego Chargers**	**W** 24–0	1–0	Oakland–Alameda County Coliseum	51,022
2	September 25	at Pittsburgh Steelers	**W** 16–7	2–0	Three Rivers Stadium	50,398
3	October 3	at **Kansas City Chiefs**	**W** 37–28	3–0	Arrowhead Stadium	60,684
4	October 9	at Cleveland Browns	**W** 26–10	4–0	Cleveland Municipal Stadium	80,236
5	October 16	**Denver Broncos**	**L** 7–30	4–1	Oakland–Alameda County Coliseum	53,616
6	October 23	at New York Jets	**W** 28–27	5–1	Shea Stadium	56,734
7	October 30	at **Denver Broncos**	**W** 24–14	6–1	Mile High Stadium	75,007
8	November 6	**Seattle Seahawks**	**W** 44–7	7–1	Oakland–Alameda County Coliseum	50,929
9	November 13	Houston Oilers	**W** 34–29	8–1	Oakland–Alameda County Coliseum	53,667
10	November 20	at **San Diego Chargers**	**L** 7–12	8–2	San Diego Stadium	50,887
11	November 28	Buffalo Bills	**W** 34–13	9–2	Oakland–Alameda County Coliseum	51,558
12	December 4	at Los Angeles Rams	**L** 14–20	9–3	Los Angeles Memorial Coliseum	67,075
13	December 11	Minnesota Vikings	**W** 35–13	10–3	Oakland–Alameda County Coliseum	52,771
14	December 18	**Kansas City Chiefs**	**W** 21–20	11–3	Oakland–Alameda County Coliseum	50,304
Note: Intra-division opponents are in **bold** text.

=== Results ===
==== Week 1 ====
Quarter	1	2	3	4	Total
Chargers	0	0	0	0	**0**
**Raiders**	7	10	7	0	**24**

at Oakland Alameda County Coliseum, Oakland, California

- Game time: 1:00 p.m.
- Game weather: 66 °F (19 °C) (24.4 °C), wind 11 mph (18 km/h)
- TV announcers (NBC): Jim Simpson, Merlin Olsen
- Box Score

Scoring summary

Quarter	Time	Drive			Team	Scoring information	Score	
Quarter	Time	Plays	Yards	TOP	Team	Scoring information	Chargers	Raiders
1					Raiders	Cliff Branch 7-yard touchdown reception from Ken Stabler, Errol Mann kick good	0	7
2					Raiders	20-yard field goal by Errol Mann	0	10
2					Raiders	Dave Casper 1-yard touchdown reception from Ken Stabler, Errol Mann kick good	0	17
3					Raiders	Pete Banaszak 2-yard touchdown run, Errol Mann kick good	0	24
"TOP" = time of possession. For other American football terms, see Glossary of American football.							0	24

==== Week 2 ====
Team	1	2	3	4	Total
• Raiders	0	9	0	7	16
Steelers	0	0	0	7	7

- Date: September 25
- Location: Three Rivers Stadium, Pittsburgh, Pennsylvania
- Game start: 1:00 p.m.
- Game weather: 67 °F (19 °C), wind 9 mph (14 km/h)

Scoring summary
2	OAK	Errol Mann 21 yard field goal	Raiders 3–0
2	OAK	Errol Mann 40 yard field goal	Raiders 6–0
2	OAK	Errol Mann 41 yard field goal	Raiders 9–0
4	OAK	Mark van Eeghen 8 yard run (Errol Mann kick)	Raiders 16–0
4	PIT	Bennie Cunningham 43 yard pass from Terry Bradshaw (Roy Gerela kick)	Raiders 16–7

==== Week 3 ====
Team	1	2	3	4	Total
• Raiders	7	6	21	3	37
Chiefs	0	21	0	7	28

- Date: October 3
- Location: Arrowhead Stadium, Kansas City, Missouri
- Game start: 8:00 p.m.
- Television network: ABC

Scoring summary
1	OAK	Fred Biletnikoff 21 yard pass from Ken Stabler (Errol Mann) kick	Raiders 7–0
2	OAK	Errol Mann 42 yard field goal	Raiders 10–0
2	KC	Walter White 48 yard pass from Mike Livingston (Jan Stenerud kick)	Raiders 10–7
2	KC	Walter White 1 yard pass from Mike Livingston (Jan Stenerud kick)	Chiefs 14–10
2	KC	Henry Marshall 41 yard pass from Mike Livingston (Jan Stenerud kick)	Chiefs 21–10
2	OAK	Errol Mann 34 yard field goal	Chiefs 21–13
3	OAK	Pete Banaszak 1 yard run (Errol Mann kick)	Chiefs 21–20
3	OAK	Clarence Davis 37 yard run (Errol Mann kick)	Raiders 27–21
3	OAK	Clarence Davis 2 yard run (Errol Mann kick)	Raiders 34–21
4	KC	Lawrence Williams 13 yard run (Jan Stenerud kick)	Raiders 34–28
4	OAK	Errol Mann 22 yard field goal	Raiders 37–28

==== Week 6 ====
Team	1	2	3	4	Total
• Raiders	14	0	0	14	28
Jets	13	14	0	0	27

- Date: October 23
- Location: Shea Stadium, Flushing, New York
- Game start: 1:00 p.m.
- Game attendance: 56,734

Scoring summary
Q1	OAK	Mark van Eeghen 3 yard run (Errol Mann kick)	OAK 7–0
Q1	NYJ	Jerome Barkum 18 yard pass from Richard Todd (Pat Leahy kick)	Tie 7–7
Q1	OAK	Dave Casper 19 yard pass from Ken Stabler (Errol Mann kick)	OAK 14–7
Q1	NYJ	Wesley Walker 87 yard pass from Richard Todd (kick failed)	OAK 14–13
Q2	NYJ	Rich Caster 14 yard pass from Richard Todd (Pat Leahy kick)	NYJ 20–14
Q2	NYJ	Clark Gaines 14 yard pass from Richard Todd (Pat Leahy kick)	NYJ 27–14
Q4	OAK	Fred Biletnikoff 7 yard pass from Ken Stabler (Errol Mann kick)	NYJ 27–21
Q4	OAK	Mike Siani 24 yard pass from Ken Stabler (Errol Mann kick)	OAK 28–27

==== Week 11 ====
Team	1	2	3	4	Total
Bills	3	7	3	0	13
• Raiders	13	7	14	0	34

- Date: November 28
- Location: Oakland–Alameda County Coliseum, Oakland, California
- Game start: 6:00 p.m.
- Game attendance: 51,558
- Game weather: 56 °F (13 °C) • Wind 6 mph (9.7 km/h)
- Television network: ABC

Scoring summary
1	OAK	Cliff Branch 28 yard pass from Ken Stabler (kick failed)	Raiders 6–0
1	BUF	Carson Long 33 yard field goal	Raiders 6–3
1	OAK	Fred Biletnikoff 44 yard pass from Ken Stabler (Errol Mann kick)	Raiders 13–3
2	BUF	John Kimbrough 29 yard pass from Joe Ferguson (Carson Long kick)	Raiders 13–10
2	OAK	Pete Banaszak 1 yard run (Errol Mann kick)	Raiders 20–10
3	BUF	Carson Long 40 yard field goal	Raiders 20–13
3	OAK	Cliff Branch 12 yard pass from Ken Stabler (Errol Mann kick)	Raiders 27–13
3	OAK	Pete Banaszak 1 yard run (Errol Mann kick)	Raiders 34–13

==== Week 13 ====
- Network: CBS
- Announcers: Vin Scully, Alex Hawkins

Oakland capitalizing on Minnesota mistakes, scored three times in the first 8 minutes and kept their hopes for a playoff berth alive. "We Got Stomped", Vikings coach Bud Grant said after his team had lost a total of five fumbles and had three passes intercepted. Ken Stabler threw three touchdown passes one to Carl Garrett for 2 yards, and two others to Cliff Branch from 32 and 10 yards. Mark Van Eeghan who rushed for 112 yards on 28 yards got the Raiders day going with a 2-yard touchdown run. While Willie Hall of Super Bowl XI fame scored a fumble recovery touchdown off a Tommy Kramer blunder.

=== Standings ===
AFC West
	W	L	T	PCT	DIV	CONF	PF	PA	STK
Denver Broncos^{(1)}	12	2	0	.857	6–1	11–1	274	148	L1
Oakland Raiders^{(4)}	11	3	0	.786	5–2	10–2	351	230	W2
San Diego Chargers	7	7	0	.500	3–4	6–6	222	205	L2
Seattle Seahawks	5	9	0	.357	1–3	4–9	282	373	W2
Kansas City Chiefs	2	12	0	.143	1–6	1–11	225	349	L6

== Playoffs ==
Oakland made the playoffs as a wild card and won its divisional round game against the Baltimore Colts when Errol Mann tied the game with a late field goal, set up by a pass to tight end Dave Casper, a play known as the Ghost to the Post. In the second overtime, Casper caught another touchdown pass for the victory. The following week on New Year's Day, they lost the AFC Championship Game 20–17 in Denver.

Round	Date	Opponent	Result	Record	Venue	Attendance
Divisional	December 24	at Baltimore Colts	W 37–31 (2OT)	1–0	Memorial Stadium	60,763
AFC Championship	January 1, 1978	at Denver Broncos	L 17–20	1–1	Mile High Stadium	74,982

== Statistics ==
=== Passing ===
Player	Comp	Att	Yards	TD	INT
Ken Stabler	169	294	2176	20	20

=== Rushing ===
Player	Att	Yards	TD
Ken Stabler	3	−3	–

=== Receiving ===
Player	Rec	Yards	TD
Dave Casper	48	584	6
Cliff Branch	33	540	6
Fred Biletnikoff	33	446	5
