= Randy Burke =

American football player (1955–2025)

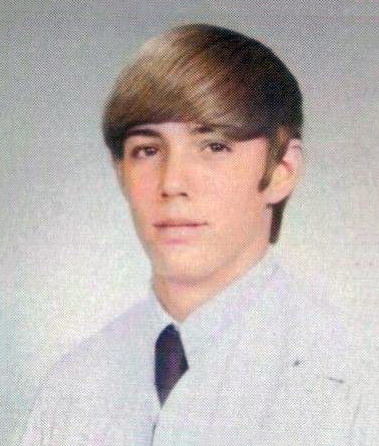
- Burke in 1973

No. 84, 88
- Position: Wide receiver

Personal information
- Born: May 26, 1955; Miami, Florida, U.S.
- Died: November 18, 2025 (aged 70)
- Listed height: 6 ft 2 in (1.88 m)
- Listed weight: 190 lb (86 kg)

Career information
- High school: Southwest Miami (Olympia Heights, Florida)
- College: Kentucky
- NFL draft: 1977: 1st round, 26th overall pick

Career history
- Baltimore Colts (1977–1981); Los Angeles Raiders (1983)*; Washington Federals (1984)
- * Offseason or practice squad member only

Career NFL statistics
- Receptions: 30
- Receiving yards: 489
- Receiving average: 16.3
- Receiving touchdowns: 3
- Stats at Pro Football Reference

Randall William Burke (May 26, 1955 – November 18, 2025) was an American professional football player who was a wide receiver for five seasons with the Baltimore Colts of the National Football League (NFL) from 1977 to 1981. He played college football for the Kentucky Wildcats before he was selected by the Colts in the first round of the 1977 NFL draft with the 26th overall pick. He also played for the Washington Federals of the United States Football League (USFL).

== Early life ==
Randall William Burke was born in Miami, Florida, on May 26, 1955. He attended Southwest Miami Senior High School in Olympia Heights, Florida, where he played football and ran track. Southwest went 0-9-1 in Burke's senior season, leaving Burke with little hope to receive a college football scholarship. He began to pursue a track scholarship, but through his high school track coach, he made contact with the University of Kentucky's football team and eventually earned a football scholarship to play for the Wildcats.

== College career ==
Burke attended the University of Kentucky from 1973 to 1977. The Wildcats used a run-oriented offense during Burke's time on the team, which led to minimal production from him. During his college career, Burke appeared in 33 games with 37 receptions for 428 yards and three touchdowns. Despite his limited role, Burke received an invite to the 1977 Senior Bowl where he set a then-Senior Bowl record of 11 receptions for 126 yards.

== Professional career ==
=== Baltimore Colts (1977–1981) ===
Burke's Senior Bowl performance, combined with a fast showing in the 40-yard dash, impressed NFL scouts. Burke was selected in the first round by the Baltimore Colts with the 26th overall pick in the 1977 NFL draft. Burke missed his entire rookie season in 1977 after suffering a separated shoulder during the first week of training camp. Injuries would plague his early career, as he would later suffer from knee issues that required surgery and a bad bruise on his heel to start the 1979 season.

In 1978, Burke appeared in 15 games, mainly on special teams. In the Colts' week six game against the St. Louis Cardinals, Burke blocked a punt from Steve Little. In week nine of the 1978 season, Burke was credited with a safety against the Miami Dolphins. In December 1978, Burke was indicted by a grand jury for insurance fraud and for making false reports to police. Burke reported his car stolen in May of that year, obtaining $2,100 from State Farm Insurance. His car was actually safe in Bowling Green, Kentucky. He was given a suspended $5,000 fine and a suspended 3 year jail sentence for his actions.

Burke saw more playing time at wide receiver during the 1979 season. He started in two games and had six receptions for 151 yards during the season. His best game was the season opener against the Kansas City Chiefs, where he recorded three receptions for 54 yards. His longest catch of the season went for 59 yards against the Buffalo Bills in week eight. Burke continued to produce on special teams, with eight tackles and four assisted tackles on kickoff coverage and three tackles on punt coverage.

Burke's best statistical season was in 1980. Burke recorded 14 receptions for 185 yards and three touchdowns. His first career touchdown reception came on a 19-yard pass from quarterback Bert Jones during a week four victory against the New York Jets. Burke also continued to appear on special teams. His season was cut short by a lingering week three thigh injury, and he missed six games throughout the 1980 season.

In 1981, his final season with the Colts, Burke had 10 receptions for 153 yards. His best offensive performance came in week 16 against the New England Patriots when he had five receptions for 69 yards. He continued to play well on special teams, leading the punt coverage unit with seven tackles and four assisted tackles, topped by a blocked punt against the Cleveland Browns in week eight.

Burke was cut from the Colts' roster on September 6, 1982.

=== Los Angeles Raiders (1983) ===
Burke was a member of the Los Angeles Raiders during their 1983 training camp, but was released before the start of the season.

=== Washington Federals (1984) ===
Burke played in one game for the Washington Federals of the United States Football League during the 1984 season, recording one reception for seven yards. He would eventually retire after the season, citing being "banged up" from his injuries.

== Personal life and death ==
Burke majored in business while attending college. After retiring from the NFL Burke worked at WKYT for 29 years as a senior marketing consultant. He retired in 2017. Burke died on November 18, 2025, at the age of 70.

== Professional career statistics ==
=== NFL ===
NFL career stats
Year	Team	Games		Receiving				
Year	Team	GP	GS	Rec	Yds	Avg	Lng	TD
1977	BAL	0	0	Injured Reserve				
1978	BAL	15	0	0	0	0.0	0	0
1979	BAL	16	2	6	151	25.2	59	0
1980	BAL	10	0	14	185	13.2	19	3
1981	BAL	16	1	10	153	15.3	24	0
Career		57	3	30	489	16.3	59	3

=== USFL ===
USFL career stats
Year	Team	Games		Receiving				
Year	Team	GP	GS	Rec	Yds	Avg	Lng	TD
1984	WAS	1	0	1	7	7.0	7	0
Career		1	0	1	7	7.0	7	0
