= Blanchard Carter =

American football player (born 1955)

No. 66
- Position: Offensive tackle

Personal information
- Born: June 3, 1955 (age 71); Stockton, California, U.S.
- Listed height: 6 ft 4 in (1.93 m)
- Listed weight: 250 lb (113 kg)

Career information
- High school: Edison (Stockton)
- College: UNLV
- NFL draft: 1977: 7th round, 193rd overall pick

Career history
- Baltimore Colts (1977)*; Tampa Bay Buccaneers (1977)
- * Offseason or practice squad member only

Career NFL statistics
- Games played: 13
- Fumble recoveries: 1
- Stats at Pro Football Reference

Blanchard Carter (born June 3, 1955) is an American former professional football player who was a tackle for the Tampa Bay Buccaneers of the National Football League (NFL) in 1977. He played college football for the UNLV Rebels.
