= Roger Carr =

American football player and coach (born 1952)

- Carr in 1977

No. 81, 87
- Position: Wide receiver

Personal information
- Born: July 1, 1952 (age 74); Seminole, Oklahoma, U.S.
- Listed height: 6 ft 3 in (1.91 m)
- Listed weight: 200 lb (91 kg)

Career information
- High school: Enid (OK) (1967–1968); Cotton Valley (LA) (1969–1970)
- College: Louisiana Tech
- NFL draft: 1974: 1st round, 24th overall pick

Career history

Playing
- Baltimore Colts (1974–1981); Seattle Seahawks (1982); San Diego Chargers (1983)

Coaching
- Louisiana Tech (1984) Graduate assistant; Northeast Louisiana (1987–1988) Wide receivers; Arkansas State (1991) Wide receivers; East Mississippi (1992–1993) Offensive coordinator; Samford (1994–1998) Offensive coordinator; Louisiana–Monroe (1999–2000) Offensive coordinator; St. Frederick High School (2001) Offensive coordinator; St. Frederick High School (2002–2003 ) Head coach; East Mississippi (2004–2007) Head coach

Awards and highlights
- Second-team All-Pro (1976); Pro Bowl (1976); NFL receiving yards leader (1976); First-team Little All-American (1972); Second-team Little All-American (1973)

Career NFL statistics
- Receptions: 271
- Receiving yards: 5,071
- Receiving touchdowns: 31
- Stats at Pro Football Reference

Roger Dale Carr (born July 1, 1952) is an American former professional football player who was a wide receiver for 10 seasons in the National Football League (NFL), primarily with the Baltimore Colts. Carr led the NFL in receiving yards in 1976, earning a Pro Bowl selection. He played college football for the Louisiana Tech Bulldogs.

Carr later served as a college and high school football coach at Louisiana Tech, Northeast Louisiana, Arkansas State, and East Mississippi Community College.

== Early life ==
Carr was born on July 1, 1952, in Seminole, Oklahoma. Carr attended Enid High School in Enid, Oklahoma for his freshman and sophomore years. He played on the Enid football team as an offensive guard and linebacker and competed on the track and field team, winning an Oklahoma state title in the decathlon as a sophomore. Prior to his junior year, he moved to Cotton Valley, Louisiana to live with his grandparents.

At Cotton Valley, Louisiana's high school transfer rules required that Carr sit-out of sports for his first year. In his senior year, he played basketball, baseball, and ran track. He did not play football as a Louisiana high schooler. The Cotton Valley track team was not well organized, but an open call for students to compete at a district track meet interested Carr. He entered the meet in the long jump, winning the competition. He went on to win the Louisiana state title with a 22' 11.75" jump. Carr received a scholarship to run track at Louisiana Tech.

== College career ==
Upon arriving at Louisiana Tech, football coach Maxie Lambright was introduced to Carr by track coach Jim Mize. Mize knew Carr to be a good punter, and he was given a tryout. Carr impressed as a punter, and earned a football scholarship. Once on the team, the Bulldogs' receivers coach, Mickey Slaughter, noticed Carr's speed and he was moved to wide receiver. Carr had never played wide receiver prior to arriving at Louisiana Tech.

In his freshman year, Louisiana Tech struggled and Carr's production was limited to 15 receptions for 374 yards and two touchdowns. The next season, the Bulldogs went 9-2 and won the Southland Conference, their first year in the league. Carr caught 29 passes for 738 yards and eight touchdowns.

During Carr's final two college seasons, Louisiana Tech became an NCAA Division II powerhouse. The Bulldogs, who were led defensively by future Pro Football Hall of Fame defensive end Fred Dean, went 24-1 and won two straight Division II national titles. Carr was named to the Little All-American team in both 1972 and 1973.

Carr left Louisiana Tech as the school's all-time touchdown reception leader. He was inducted into the Louisiana Tech University Athletic Hall of Fame in 2007.

== Professional career ==
The Baltimore Colts selected Carr in the first round of the 1974 NFL draft with the 24th overall selection. Carr was the second Colts selection of the first round, with John Dutton taken with the fifth overall selection.

=== Baltimore Colts (1974-1981) ===
==== 1974 season ====
The Colts were in a rebuilding period when Carr arrived. Quarterbacks Bert Jones and Marty Domres had taken over for the recently traded Johnny Unitas, and the team went 2-12 in Carr's rookie season. Carr suffered an injury in training camp, leading him to miss the first three games of the season. He made his NFL debut on October 6, 1974, in a 42-38 home loss to the New England Patriots, Carr caught just one pass. In the rematch in week 11, Carr caught two passes for 87 yards. His best performance came in the final game of the season. Though the Colts lost to the New York Jets 45-38, Carr caught six passes for 91 yards. Carr started the last eight games of the season and ended with 21 receptions for 405 yards.

==== 1975 season ====
In the 1975 season, Carr started all 14 games for the Colts. Under new head coach Ted Marchibroda, the Colts made a turnaround and finished the season at 10-4 while winning the AFC East Division. Carr's first career touchdown came on an 89-yard strike from Bert Jones in a week eight come-from-behind victory over the Buffalo Bills. Carr finished the game with two receptions for 136 yards and one touchdown. The following week, Carr caught a 90-yard touchdown reception from Jones, setting a then-franchise record for longest reception. Carr finished the year with 23 receptions for 517 yards and two touchdowns. The Colts lost in the first round of the playoffs to the Pittsburgh Steelers, who went on to win Super Bowl X.

==== 1976 season ====
Carr's breakout season came in 1976. Carr led the NFL in receiving yards, catching 43 passes for 1,112 yards and 11 touchdowns, with an average of 25.9 yards per catch. Carr's 25.9 average yards per catch remains a Colts record (as of 2023). Carr earned his only Pro Bowl selection that year, while also earning All-Pro Second Team honors. Colts quarterback Bert Jones won the NFL MVP award that year. The Colts repeated as AFC East Division champions, going 11-3 before again losing in the first round of the playoffs to the Pittsburgh Steelers.

His record-setting season took off in week two, where Carr had six receptions for 198 yards and three touchdowns. In week seven, Carr had five catches for 210 yards and two touchdowns, one of which was a 79-yard completion. In the final week of the season, he caught four passes for 114 yards and one touchdown against the Bills, giving him the receiving yards and receiving yard average title for the season.

==== 1977 season ====
Coming into the 1977 season, Carr held out of training camp and most of the preseason as part of a contract dispute. Carr's season was then shortened due to a knee injury suffered in practice following week two of the regular season. He only appeared in seven games with 11 receptions for 199 yards and one touchdown. Baltimore won the AFC East Division for the third straight year, finishing at 10-4. They lost to the Oakland Raiders in the Divisional Round of the playoffs.

==== 1978 season ====
The 1978 season saw the beginning of several down years for the Colts. The team went 5-11, missing the playoffs, as quarterback Bert Jones missed most of the season with a shoulder injury. Carr started in all 16 games and led the Colts in receiving with 30 receptions for 629 yards and six touchdowns.

In a week three victory over the New England Patriots Carr had six receptions for 187 yards and two touchdowns. The Colts entered the fourth quarter trailing 7-13. Carr opened the final quarter's scoring with a 54-yard touchdown reception from running back Joe Washington, putting the Colts up 14-13. Carr then caught his second touchdown on a 67-yard pass from quarterback Bill Troup. The Patriots answered with two touchdown runs before Washington sealed the 34-27 victory with a 90-yard kickoff return for a touchdown.

==== 1979 season ====
Injuries plagued Carr's 1979 season, leading him to miss seven games. He started in all nine games that he appeared in, with 27 receptions for 400 yards and one touchdown. Bert Jones's lingering injuries caused him to miss substantial playing time for the second season in row, and the Colts faltered under backup Greg Landry. The team finished 5-11 and Marchibroda was fired at the conclusion of the season.

==== 1980 season ====
Prior to the 1980 season, Carr sought to be traded from Baltimore. He hoped to finish his NFL career closer to his family in Louisiana and Oklahoma. During the offseason, he visited the Houston Oilers and he and the Colts seemed on the path to a trade. The Colts did not find a suitable trade partner, and Carr reported to training camp.

Bert Jones returned to form in 1980, leading to an increase in Carr's production. Carr led the Colts in receptions and receiving yards, and set a career high in receptions. He caught 61 passes for 924 yards and five touchdowns. Carr topped 100 receiving yards three times during the 1980 season. His best game came in week 14 against the Cincinnati Bengals where he recorded seven receptions for 133 yards. Under first year head coach Mike McCormack, the Colts went 7-9 and missed the playoffs for the third straight season.

==== 1981 season ====
In 1981, the Colts team faltered once again. The team went 2-14, only winning the opening and closing games of the year - both against the New England Patriots. This season proved to be the last of the Jones-Carr era with the Colts. Carr finished the year with 38 receptions for 584 yards and three touchdowns in 15 games (all starts). Following the season, coach Mike McCormack was fired and replaced by Frank Kush.

==== Trade to Seattle ====
Carr reported to the Colts' 1982 training camp, but initially refused to take part in drills and workouts. On July 27, 1982, Carr was suspended by the Colts for three weeks due to his remarks and actions towards new head coach Frank Kush.

Carr returned to training camp in mid-August, only to immediately receive another three-week suspension. Carr walked onto the practice field wearing red shorts, and was ordered off the field by Kush before being suspended for "conduct detrimental to the ball club."

After several weeks of speculation, Carr was traded to the Seattle Seahawks on September 4, 1982, in exchange for future draft considerations.

=== Seattle Seahawks (1982) ===
Carr joined a Seahawk team with a crowded wide receiver group, featuring Steve Largent and Paul Johns. In a strike-shortened 1982 season, Carr appeared in all nine games that were played, but saw limited action. He recorded 15 receptions for 265 yards and two touchdowns. After starting 0-2, the Seahawks replaced head coach Jack Patera with Carr's former Colts coach Mike McCormack. The Seahawks ended the truncated season at 4-5.

In the lead-up to the 1983 season, Carr demanded to be paid more or be traded to a team where he could receive more playing time. In July 1983, the Seahawks announced that Carr had retired from the NFL. However, Carr claimed that the Seahawks disclosed Carr's retirement prematurely. He contemplated joining the United States Football League, which was eyeing Tulsa, Oklahoma for a franchise location.

On August 24, 1983, the Seahawks traded Carr to the San Diego Chargers for draft considerations.

=== San Diego Chargers (1983) ===
Carr again suffered injury setbacks during his one season in San Diego. He appeared in four games and recorded only two receptions for 36 yards. Carr retired following the 1983 season.

== Professional statistics ==
Legend
	Led the league
**Bold**	Career high

Year	Team	Games		Receiving				
Year	Team	GP	GS	Rec	Yds	Avg	Lng	TD
1974	BAL	11	8	21	405	19.3	57	0
1975	BAL	14	14	23	517	22.5	**90**	2
1976	BAL	14	14	43	**1,112**	**25.9**	79	**11**
1977	BAL	7	0	11	199	18.1	45	1
1978	BAL	**16**	**16**	30	629	21.0	78	6
1979	BAL	9	9	27	400	14.8	37	1
1980	BAL	**16**	**16**	**61**	924	15.1	43	5
1981	BAL	15	15	38	584	15.4	43	3
1982	SEA	9	0	15	265	17.7	50	2
1983	SDG	4	0	2	36	18.0	23	0
Career		115	92	271	5,071	18.7	90	31

== Coaching career ==
Following his retirement from playing, Carr returned to Louisiana. In 1984, he served as a graduate assistant at his alma mater Louisiana Tech while finishing his degree. He then provided color commentary for radio broadcasts of Louisiana Tech football games in 1985.

Carr then served as the wide receivers coach at Northeast Louisiana University (now University of Louisiana at Monroe) for two seasons, from 1987-1988.

In 1991, Carr was hired by Arkansas State as their wide receivers coach, where he spent one year. In 1992, Carr was hired by the Miami Tribe of the Professional Spring Football League to be their wide receivers coach. However, the league folded 10 days before their inaugural season. Carr then moved to East Mississippi Community College in the fall of 1992, where he served as the offensive coordinator under Tom Goode for two seasons.

After coaching at the high school level, Carr returned to East Mississippi in 2004 as head coach and athletic director, taking over for Tom Goode. Carr coached EMCC from 2004 to 2007, when he was replaced by Buddy Stephens.
