= Dick Szymanski =

American football player and executive (1932–2021)

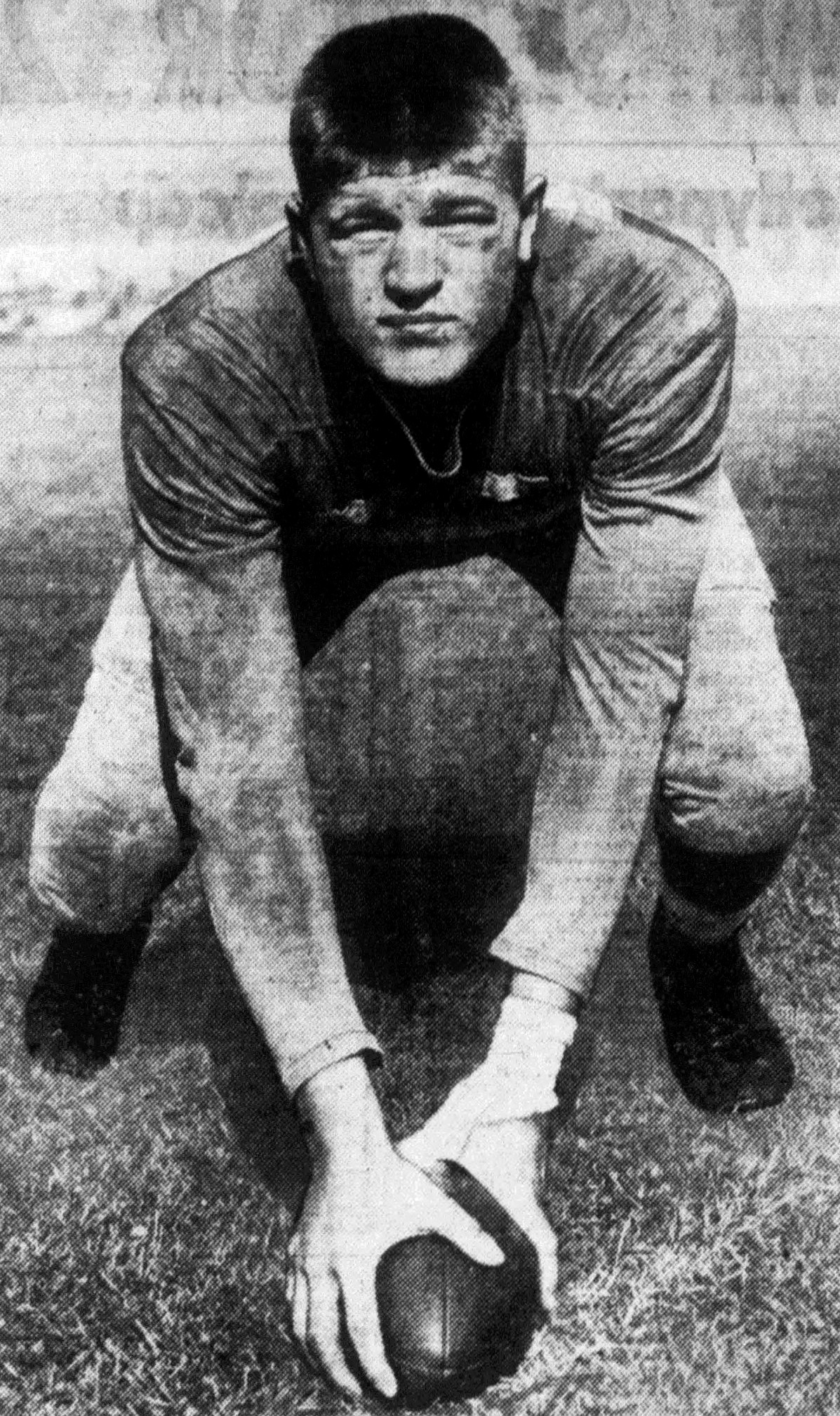
- Szymanski, circa 1951

No. 52
- Positions: Center, linebacker

Personal information
- Born: October 7, 1932; Toledo, Ohio, U.S.
- Died: October 28, 2021 (aged 89); Sanford, Florida, U.S.
- Listed height: 6 ft 3 in (1.91 m)
- Listed weight: 233 lb (106 kg)

Career information
- High school: Libbey (Toledo)
- College: Notre Dame (1951–1954)
- NFL draft: 1955: 2nd round, 16th overall pick

Career history

Playing
- Baltimore Colts (1955–1968)

Coaching
- Baltimore Colts (1974) Offensive line coach

Operations
- Baltimore Colts (1969–1972) Personnel assistant/scout; Baltimore Colts (1973) Asst. personnel director; Baltimore Colts (1974–1976) Director of pro personnel; Baltimore Colts (1977–1982) Executive vice president/general manager

Awards and highlights
- As a player: 3× NFL champion (1958, 1959, 1968); Second-team All-Pro (1955); 3× Pro Bowl (1955, 1962, 1964); National champion (1953); As an executive: Super Bowl champion (V)

Career NFL statistics
- Games played: 157
- Games started: 129
- Interceptions: 6
- Fumble recoveries: 5
- Stats at Pro Football Reference

Richard Frank Szymanski (Pronounced: Sa-MAN-skee) (October 7, 1932 – October 28, 2021) was an American professional football player, coach, and executive in the National Football League (NFL). As a player, Szymanski was a center and linebacker for the Baltimore Colts from 1955-1968. After retiring as a player, Szymanski remained with the Colts as a scout, personnel director, coach, and general manager from 1969-1982. Szymanski played college football at Notre Dame.

As a player, Szymanski won three NFL Championships (1958, 1959, and 1968). He was named to three Pro Bowls (1955, 1962, 1964) and earned one Second-Team All-Pro selection in 1955.

== Early life ==
Dick Szymanski was born on October 7, 1932, in Toledo, Ohio to Joseph and Helen Szymanski. He was the third of four children. His father worked for the Toledo Parks & Recreation Department and his mother ran a Polish bakery. Szymanski attended Libbey High School in Toledo, where he was an All-City selection in basketball and baseball and earned All-America honors in football.

Following his high school football career, Szymanski was offered scholarships to play for Ohio State, Michigan, and Notre Dame.

== College career ==
Szymanski played college football at the University of Notre Dame under head coaches Frank Leahy and Terry Brennan, where he was a four-year letterman at linebacker from 1951-1954. Szymanski won a national championship in 1953, as Notre Dame went 9-0-1 on the season. As a senior, despite suffering an injury that required surgery, Szymanski was the starting center for the College All-Star team that upset the Cleveland Browns, 30-27.

== Playing career ==
=== Baltimore Colts (1955–1968) ===
Szymanski was selected by the Baltimore Colts with the 16th overall pick in the second of the 1955 NFL draft.

In 1955, Szymanski started at center for all 12 games of his rookie year. He helped clear the way for fullback Alan Ameche, who led the league in rushing with 961 yards. Although the Colts went 5-6-1 on the year, Szymanski was selected to the 1955 Pro Bowl and was named to the 1955 All-Pro Second-team.

Szymanski was drafted into the U.S. Army prior to the 1956 season and spent a year stationed in Germany. Upon returning to the Colts for the 1957 season, he was moved from center to linebacker and appeared in five games. In 1958, Szymanski returned to playing center where he appeared in eight games before suffering a season-ending injury. He was one of the few Colts players not on the field during their 1958 NFL Championship win over the New York Giants.

In 1959, Szymanski moved back to linebacker, joining Don Shinnick and Bill Pellington as one of the best linebacker groups of the era. The Colts repeated as NFL Champions in a rematch against the Giants. In 1961, he returned to center where he played for the rest of his career.

From 1959 to 1964, Szymanski did not miss a game, starting in all 80 possible regular season games. During that stretch he earned two Pro Bowl selections in 1962 and 1964. The Colts reached the NFL Championship Game in 1964, losing to the Cleveland Browns.

In Szymanski's final season as a player, the Colts returned to the NFL Championship game in a rematch against the Browns, where they won 34-0. In Super Bowl III, the Colt suffered and upset to Joe Namath and the New York Jets. Szymanski retired from playing following the 1968 season.

Szymanski was referred to by Colts teammates as "Syzzie," and was known for his toughness in an era of football where injuries could cost a player his job. Colts teammate Art Donovan recalled the injury against the Chicago Bears in 1958 that caused Szymanski to miss the remainder of the season. Donovan wrote in his biography Fatso: Football When Men Were Really Men:

We were coming out of the locker room at Wrigley to get on the team bus and I offered [Szymanski] a hand. I think I asked him if I could carry his shoulder bag or something innocuous like that. At any rate, he got all indignant, yelling at me, ‘Don’t you worry about me, Fatso, I’m just fine! I’ll be seeing you in practice Tuesday and I’ll be kicking your ass!’ Yet whenever that bus hit a bump on the way to the airport, I noticed old Syzzie was squirming in pain. In those days, you just didn’t want to show it.

We drank beer all the way home on the plane, and that seemed to improve Syzzie’s outlook. But, sure enough, when I called his apartment the next morning to check up on him, his landlady told me he had checked into Union Memorial Hospital. I found out he was being operated on, so I stopped by that afternoon just in time to see him being wheeled back into his room on a gurney.

He was in pain, yelling for more shots. But as soon as he saw me standing at his bedside, suddenly there was nothing wrong with him. I told him to take the shots while he could get them. But suddenly he didn’t need shots anymore. I figured I better get the hell out of the hospital before Syzzie went into shock from refusing painkillers in front of a teammate. And I was the guy’s best friend. Imagine if a coach or an owner had walked in. He probably would have been doing jumping jacks.

== Executive career ==
=== Baltimore Colts (1969–1981) ===
Following his retirement as a player, Szymanski continued with Baltimore as a scout, personnel director, and general manager. From 1969 to 1972, he was a scout and personnel assistant. In 1970, Szymanski was a member of the Colts Super Bowl V winning team.

In 1973, Szymanski was promoted to assistant personnel director. In February 1974, Szymanski was again promoted to director of personnel. During the 1974 preseason, the Colts fired offensive line coach George Young and replaced him with Szymanski for the first several games of the season. He continued to serve as the director of pro personnel through the 1976 season.

Szymanski became the Colts general manager prior to the 1977 season, succeeding Joe Thomas. In his five seasons as general manager, the Colts saw a decline in their success under head coaches Ted Marchibroda and Mike McCormack. From 1977 to 1981, the Colts amassed a 29-49 record and made one playoff appearance in the 1977 season, losing in the Divisional Round to the Oakland Raiders. Szymanski resigned as general manager in May 1982.

== Personal life ==
From 1991-1992, Szymanski served as a chapter vice president with the NFL Alumni Association.

In 1994, Szymanski was inducted into the National Polish-American Sports Hall of Fame.

Szymanski was married in 1964 and had two children. He and his wife relocated to Florida following his retirement from the NFL.

Szymanski died on October 28, 2021, age 89, in Sanford, Florida.
