= Marshall Johnson =

American football player (born 1952)

- Johnson in 1977

No. 29, 80
- Positions: Wide receiver, running back, return specialist

Personal information
- Born: November 1, 1952 (age 74); Jacksonville, Texas, U.S.
- Listed height: 6 ft 1 in (1.85 m)
- Listed weight: 191 lb (87 kg)

Career information
- High school: Jacksonville
- College: Houston
- NFL draft: 1975: 4th round

Career history
- Baltimore Colts (1975–1978)

Career NFL statistics
- Games played: 32
- Starts: 1
- Kick return yards: 1,076 (22.0 average)
- Receiving yards: 137 (27.4 average)
- Receiving touchdowns: 2
- Stats at Pro Football Reference

Marshall Donell Johnson (born November 1, 1952) is an American former professional football player who was a wide receiver for the Baltimore Colts of the National Football League (NFL). He played college football for the Houston Cougars.

Johnson was selected in the fourth round of the 1975 NFL draft by the Colts, who made him the 80th overall selection. He played 14 games for Baltimore during the team's 1975 season, making his four catches on the year count by grabbing two touchdown passes. He was injured in a preseason game against the Chicago Bears ahead of the 1976 season, however, and missed the entire year following knee surgery.

He had a kickoff return for a touchdown in the 1977 AFC Divisional Game between the Colts and Oakland Raiders known for having the Ghost to the Post play.
