= Toni Linhart =

Austrian football player (1942–2013)

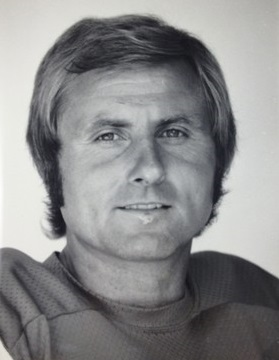
- Linhart in 1978

Personal information
- Full name: Anton Hans Jörg Linhart
- Date of birth: 24 July 1942
- Place of birth: Donawitz, Austria
- Date of death: 12 May 2013 (aged 70)
- Place of death: Timonium, Maryland, U.S.
- Height: 1.83 m (6 ft 0 in)
- Position: Defender

Senior career*
Years	Team	Apps	(Gls)
1961–1970	Wiener Sportclub	195	(7)
1970–1972	First Vienna FC	44	(0)
1973–1974	Badener AC		

International career
1963–1969	Austria	6	(1)
- * Club domestic league appearances and goals

Toni Linhart
No. 2
- Position: Kicker

Personal information
- Listed height: 6 ft 0 in (1.83 m)
- Listed weight: 180 lb (82 kg)

Career history
- New Orleans Saints (1972); Baltimore Colts (1974–1979); New York Jets (1979)

Awards and highlights
- NFL scoring leader (1976); Golden Toe Award (1976); Pro Bowl (1976)
- Stats at Pro Football Reference

Anton Hans Jörg "Toni" Linhart (24 July 1942 – 12 May 2013) was an Austrian football player. He played professional association football for 12 seasons in Europe and appeared 6 times for Austria before launching a successful second career as an American football placekicker in the United States, where in 1976 he led the National Football League (NFL) in scoring and was selected as a participant in the Pro Bowl for that season.

== Early life and education ==
Linhart was born in Donawitz, now part of Leoben, in Styria, and grew up Trofaiach. His father served in the German army during World War II and in June 1944 was stationed in France, where he was taken a Prisoner of War on the third day of the D-Day invasion. He was shipped to the United States, where he worked on a farm until repatriation. Linhart was a cousin of Peter Persidis, who was later a teammate at First Vienna FC.

Linhart was educated as an architectural engineer.

An accomplished skier, Linhart tried out for — and nearly made — Austria's 1960 Olympic downhill skiing team.

== Career ==
=== Association football ===
Linhart began his professional career in June 1962 with Wiener Sportclub in the Austrian Bundesliga; he appeared in 195 matches, primarily as a defender, and scored 7 goals. In 1970 he was transferred to First Vienna, where he played for two seasons, appearing in 44 matches.

Internationally, Linhart made 6 appearances for Austria between 1963 and 1969. He scored his only international goal in a friendly against Scotland in Glasgow on 8 May 1963 that was abandoned for rough play after a confrontation with Denis Law left Linhart injured. His goal was the only one by Austria before the match was suspended with a score of 4–1.

=== American football ===
After former Cornell kicker Pete Gogolak won a spot on the roster of the Buffalo Bills of the American Football League in 1964 as a specialist placekicker and demonstrated that kicking the ball "soccer-style", using the instep rather than the toe, improved accuracy and distance, an increasing number of teams added "soccer-style" specialist kickers. The first Austrian hired by an American football team was Toni Fritsch, who joined the Dallas Cowboys of the NFL in 1971. Linhart was scouted by J. D. Roberts, head coach of the New Orleans Saints of the NFL, and at a tryout three times in a row kicked the ball right into Roberts' hands, like a pass. He was signed by the Saints in 1972, becoming the second Austrian placekicker in the American pro game.

After joining the Saints' summer training camp, Linhart witnessed and played in his first professional American football game on 7 August 1972, hitting a game-winning 9-yard field goal with 9 seconds remaining in preseason action against the Philadelphia Eagles. He found it difficult to adjust to playing on Astroturf instead of grass, saying later, "In practice my left foot was always hurting from the sudden stopping when I landed on the hard surface. I preferred a softer field. The muddier it was, the better I liked it." Throughout the preseason, he competed for a roster spot with the Saints' veteran kicker Charlie Durkee, but he was ultimately relegated at a lesser salary to the team's non-roster "taxi squad". Later in 1972 Linhart was activated for two games, during which he went 2-for-5 kicking field goals, hitting all 5 of his extra point tries.

In 1973, the Saints fired Roberts and Linhart was immediately cut, since the new head coach "didn't believe in a soccer-style kicker". Linhart returned to Austria, where he played for Badener AC of Baden bei Wien.

He was signed by the Baltimore Colts on 29 May 1974, and this time following training camp made the roster as the Colts' regular kicker. He finished the 1974 season a perfect 22-for-22 kicking extra points, while going 12-for-20 on field goals, with a season (and career) long of 45 yards. He led the team with 58 points scored for the year.

Linhart hits a 31-yard game-winner in overtime of a 1975 game against the Miami Dolphins, keeping the Colts' playoff hopes alive.

One of Linhart's greatest moments in American football came late in the 1975 season in a game against the Miami Dolphins, winners of five straight AFC East division titles. With the Colts riding a 7-game winning streak and making a run for the playoffs, the game stood tied 7–7 with less than three minutes remaining in the only overtime period allowed. Adding to the drama, Linhart had missed a 29-yard attempt earlier in the game. As fog descended into Memorial Stadium and with more than 59,000 fans on the edge of their seats, Linhart drilled the walk-off game winner, capturing the AFC East crown and keeping Baltimore's playoff hopes alive. After the game, Linhart told a reporter in a "soft, almost high-pitched voice that sounds British" that the kick was merely a matter of execution. "You had better keep yourself calm ... There is no room for an emotional kicker in this game."

The year 1976 was unarguably Linhart's best as a professional football player in the United States. Linhart scored 109 points on the season, breaking the previous single-season record for a kicker held by Lou Michaels (107). His points total was second best in NFL history, behind only Colt flanker-back Lenny Moore's 120 in 1964. That season Linhart went 19-for-20 kicking field goals from inside the 40 yard line, converting 49 of 50 extra points. He led the league in scoring that season and was rewarded by selection as a first team All-Conference player by United Press International, Pro Football Weekly, and The Sporting News, as well as selection to the 1977 Pro Bowl.

In 1978, Pimlico Race Course pitted the famously athletic Linhart in a foot race against jockey Charley Cooke; Linhart won.

By 1979, Linhart's kicking accuracy had begun to decline. He took boos from fans in stride, saying, "I've never been bothered by the fans' reaction. I played World Cup soccer before over 120,000 people. I just give total concentration to my job." In Week 3 of the 1979 NFL season, he missed three field goal attempts in a game against the Cleveland Browns, and the Colts lost 16–13. He said later that he was kicking from the dirt infield of the baseball diamond and was unable to get under the ball to elevate it. In the locker room after the game, Colts owner Bob Irsay mockingly awarded him a $10,000 bonus, instantly, in the words of Baltimore Sun columnist Bill Tanton, "electrifying the room". Two days later, Linhart was waived and replaced by Steve Mike-Mayer.

Linhart found another opportunity with the New York Jets, who signed him before Week 8 to fill in for the injured Pat Leahy. In a November game against the Buffalo Bills, Linhart missed two extra points — the margin of defeat in a 14–12 loss for the Jets. The following week, Linhart missed an extra point and a field goal in a 23-13 Jets loss to the Chicago Bears. This would prove to be his final appearance in an NFL uniform; the Jets replaced him with Dave Jacobs.

Linhart played in a total of 82 games in the NFL, going 75-for-127 (59.1%) on field goals and scoring a total of 425 points. He went to the Pro Bowl twice.

== After football ==
During his time in the NFL, Linhart and his wife spent the off-season in Ft. Pierce, Florida, where he worked in architecture. After retiring from professional football at the end of the 1979 season, he lived in Baltimore, where he ran a direct marketing business and was involved in community service, including supporting the St. Vincent's Child Abuse Center. He returned to Europe to shop and visit once or twice a year.

== Death and legacy ==
On 12 May 2013, Toni Linhart died of cancer in Timonium, Maryland, at the age of 70.

Former Colts teammate Bruce Laird recalls Linhart as having been "the first kicker I ever knew who was an athlete first". Marty Domres, holder for Linhart on placekicks, said that Linhart was "way ahead of his time in seeing his craft as a professional." Domres recalled that Linhart developed his own specialized exercise regimen making use of medicine balls and rubber resistance bands, and former teammates remembered the demanding obstacle course he created in training camp, which they were also obliged to run.

At the time of his death, six Austrian-born players had made appearances in the NFL.
