= Mike Kirkland (American football) =

American football player (born 1954)

- Kirkland in 1977

No. 15
- Position: Quarterback

Personal information
- Born: June 29, 1954 (age 72); Pasadena, Texas, U.S.
- Listed height: 6 ft 1 in (1.85 m)
- Listed weight: 195 lb (88 kg)

Career information
- High school: Pasadena
- College: Arkansas
- NFL draft: 1976: 5th round, 143rd overall pick

Career history
- Baltimore Colts (1976–1978)

Career NFL statistics
- Passing attempts: 41
- Passing completions: 19
- Completion percentage: 46.3%
- TD–INT: 1–8
- Passing yards: 211
- Passer rating: 30.7
- Stats at Pro Football Reference

Mike Kirkland (born June 29, 1954) is an American former professional football player who was a quarterback for three seasons with the Baltimore Colts of the National Football League (NFL). He played college football for the Arkansas Razorbacks.

As a 13-year-old, Kirkland won the National Punt, Pass, and Kick competition, which included a 57-yard pass. A fifth-round pick in 1976 NFL draft after played college football at the University of Arkansas, Kirkland completed 19 of 41 passes for 211 yards and one touchdown and eight interceptions in the 1978 season.

As third-string quarterback, he started two NFL games, including the 1978 opener, when the top two players were injured. Kirkland was also a kicker and punter, helping to keep him on the Baltimore roster as a backup quarterback and special teams player.

Kirkland and Scott Bull competed for the starting quarterback position at Arkansas and were both drafted into the NFL in 1976 and played in the league.
