= Wade Griffin =

American football player (born 1954)

No. 69
- Position: Offensive tackle

Personal information
- Born: August 7, 1954 (age 72); Winona, Mississippi, U.S.
- Listed height: 6 ft 5 in (1.96 m)
- Listed weight: 260 lb (118 kg)

Career information
- High school: Winona
- College: Mississippi
- NFL draft: 1977: undrafted

Career history
- Baltimore Colts (1977–1981)

Career NFL statistics
- Games played: 77
- Games started: 63
- Fumble recoveries: 5
- Stats at Pro Football Reference

Wade Hampton Griffin Jr. (born August 7, 1954) is an American former professional football player who was an offensive tackle for the Baltimore Colts of the National Football League (NFL). He was signed by the Colts as an undrafted free agent in 1977. He played college football for the Ole Miss Rebels.
