= 1981 Baltimore Colts season =

29th season in franchise history

- Owner: Robert Irsay
- General manager: Dick Szymanski
- Head coach: Mike McCormack
- Home stadium: Memorial Stadium

Results
- Record: 2–14
- Division place: 4th AFC East
- Playoffs: Did not qualify
- Pro Bowlers: None

The 1981 Baltimore Colts season was the 29th season for the team in the National Football League (NFL). The Colts finished the NFL's 1981 season with a record of 2 wins and 14 losses, finishing in a tie with the New England Patriots for both last place in their division, the AFC East, and the worst record in the league. However, by virtue of beating the Patriots for their only two wins of the season, the Colts finished ahead of New England on a tiebreaker. Those wins came in the first and last weeks of the season, as the Colts lost their other fourteen games consecutively. They won those 2 games by a combined 3 points.

The Colts’ defense had one of the worst seasons in NFL history, setting records for points (533) and yards (6,793) allowed. (The points record was later surpassed by the 2024 Carolina Panthers, who allowed 534 in a 17-game season. The yardage record was later surpassed by the 2012 New Orleans Saints, who allowed 7,042.) The Colts gave up more than twice as many points as they scored (259). Conversely, the Patriots, with whom they were tied in the AFC East, only gave up 48 more points than they scored. The Colts’ pass defense surrendered a staggering 8.19 yards-per-dropback, the most surrendered by any team in NFL history.

The Colts’ -274 point differential (points scored vs. points allowed) is the second-worst since the 1970 merger, second only to the 1976 expansion Tampa Bay Buccaneers, who finished 0–14 (ironically, the next year's Colts team went winless as well). The 1981 Colts are the first of only two NFL teams since 1940 to suffer eleven losses in a season during which they never had a lead. (Note: The other team to never lead in eleven losses is the 1990 New England Patriots.) The Colts allowed 40 points in 4 separate games during the season (including 3 games in a row from weeks 6-8), which is still an NFL record. According to Football Outsiders, they have the worst overall defense and passing defense in their ranking's history.

The season included a bizarre incident in which, during the Colts’ 38–13 loss to the Philadelphia Eagles on November 15, team owner Bob Irsay called plays from the coaches’ booth. Quarterback Bert Jones told Sports Illustrated in 1986:

[Irsay] couldn’t have told you how many players there were on the field, never mind what plays we had. All he was trying to do was embarrass the coaches and the players. When he told me to run, I threw. When he told me to throw left, I ran right.

Head coach Mike McCormack and his staff were fired less than 24 hours after the season finale. Former Arizona State coach Frank Kush was immediately named McCormack's successor.

== Offseason ==
=== NFL draft ===
1981 Baltimore Colts draft
Round	Pick	Player	Position	College	Notes
1	12	Randy McMillan	Fullback	Pittsburgh	
1	18	Donnell Thompson	Defensive end	North Carolina	from Minnesota
3	68	Randy Van Divier	Tackle	Washington	
4	94	Tim Sherwin	Tight end	Boston College	
6	149	Bubba Green	Defensive tackle	Penn State	
7	178	Obed Ariri	Kicker	Clemson	
8	204	Ken Sitton	Defensive back	Oklahoma	
8	220	Hosea Taylor	Defensive tackle	Houston	
9	233	Tim Gooch	Defensive tackle	Kentucky	
10	256	Gregg Gerken	Linebacker	Northern Arizona	
10	259	Trent Bryant	Cornerback	Arkansas	
11	288	Holden Smith	Wide receiver	North Carolina	
12	315	Eric Scoggins	Linebacker	USC	
Made roster * Made at least one Pro Bowl during career

== Personnel ==
=== Staff ===
1981 Baltimore Colts staff
Front office: President and Treasurer – Robert Irsay; General Manager – Dick Szymanski; Assistant General Manager – Ernie Accorsi; Head coaches: Head Coach – Mike McCormack; Offensive coaches: Offensive Backfield – John Idzik; Receivers – Dick Bielski; Offensive Line – Ray Wietecha	Defensive coaches: Defensive Coordinator – Chuck Weber; Defensive Line – Ed Khayat; Defensive Backfield – John Symank; Special teams coaches: Special Teams – George Boutselis

=== Roster ===
1981 Baltimore Colts roster
Quarterbacks (QB): 10 David Humm; 7 Bert Jones; 14 Jay Venuto; Running backs (RB): 27 Curtis Dickey; 31 Zachary Dixon; 28 Cleveland Franklin; 23 Don McCauley; 32 Randy McMillan; 39 Marvin Sims; 21 Kevin Williams; Wide receivers (WR): 80 Ray Butler; 84 Randy Burke; 81 Roger Carr; 87 Brian DeRoo; 85 Dave Shula; Tight ends (TE): 86 Reese McCall; 83 Tim Sherwin	Offensive linemen (OL): 53 Ray Donaldson C; 78 Tim Foley T; 66 Chris Foote C; 69 Wade Griffin T; 68 Jeff Hart T; 62 Ken Huff G; 65 Jimmy Moore G; 61 Robert Pratt G; 79 Randy Van Divier T; Defensive linemen (DL): 72 Mike Fultz DT; 91 Bubba Green DT; 88 Herb Orvis DT; 71 Mike Ozdowski DE; 90 Hosea Taylor DE; 99 Donnell Thompson DE	Linebackers (LB): 50 Joe Federspiel MLB; 51 Ricky Jones OLB; 55 Barry Krauss OLB; 54 Sanders Shiver OLB; 52 Ed Smith MLB; Defensive backs (DB): 47 Larry Braziel CB; 25 Nesby Glasgow FS/CB; 42 Derrick Hatchett CB; 44 Steve Henry CB; 40 Bruce Laird SS; 37 Reggie Pinkney SS; Special teams (ST): 9 Mike Garrett P; 16 Mike Wood K	Reserve: 26 Kim Anderson S (IR); 63 Mike Barnes DT (IR); 58 Steve Heimkreiter LB (IR); 11 Greg Landry QB (IR); 29 Bill Schoepflin CB (IR); 56 Ed Simonini LB (IR); 20 Ken Sitton S (IR); 45 Holden Smith WR (DNR); 2 Brian Sullivan P/K (IR); 59 Mike Woods LB (IR); Rookies in italics

== Regular season ==
=== Schedule ===
Week	Date	Opponent	Result	Record	Venue	Attendance
1	September 6	at **New England Patriots**	**W** 29–28	1–0	Schaefer Stadium	49,572
2	September 13	**Buffalo Bills**	**L** 3–35	1–1	Memorial Stadium	45,772
3	September 20	at Denver Broncos	**L** 10–28	1–2	Mile High Stadium	74,804
4	September 27	**Miami Dolphins**	**L** 28–31	1–3	Memorial Stadium	41,630
5	October 4	at **Buffalo Bills**	**L** 17–23	1–4	Rich Stadium	77,811
6	October 11	Cincinnati Bengals	**L** 19–41	1–5	Memorial Stadium	33,060
7	October 18	San Diego Chargers	**L** 14–43	1–6	Memorial Stadium	41,921
8	October 25	at Cleveland Browns	**L** 28–42	1–7	Cleveland Municipal Stadium	78,986
9	November 1	at **Miami Dolphins**	**L** 10–27	1–8	Miami Orange Bowl	46,061
10	November 8	**New York Jets**	**L** 14–41	1–9	Memorial Stadium	31,521
11	November 15	at Philadelphia Eagles	**L** 13–38	1–10	Veterans Stadium	68,618
12	November 22	St. Louis Cardinals	**L** 24–35	1–11	Memorial Stadium	24,784
13	November 29	at **New York Jets**	**L** 0–25	1–12	Shea Stadium	53,593
14	December 6	Dallas Cowboys	**L** 13–37	1–13	Memorial Stadium	54,871
15	December 13	at Washington Redskins	**L** 14–38	1–14	RFK Stadium	46,706
16	December 20	**New England Patriots**	**W** 23–21	2–14	Memorial Stadium	17,073
Note: Intra-division opponents are in **bold** text.

=== Game summaries ===
==== Week 1: at New England Patriots ====
Week 1: Baltimore Colts at New England Patriots – Game summary

Quarter	1	2	3	4	Total
**Colts**	10	3	3	13	**29**
Patriots	0	14	0	14	**28**

at Schaefer Stadium, Foxborough, Massachusetts

- Date: September 6
- Game time: 1:00 p.m. EDT
- Game weather: Cloudy, 63 °F (17 °C)
- Game attendance: 49,572
- Box score

Game information

**First quarter**

- BAL – Mike Wood 48-yard field goal. Colts 3–0.
- BAL – Curtis Dickey 19-yard run (Mike Wood kick). Colts 10–0.

**Second quarter**

- NE – Mosi Tatupu 8-yard pass from Andy Johnson (John Smith kick). Colts 10–7.
- BAL – Mike Wood 19-yard field goal. Colts 13–7.
- NE – Carlos Pennywell 22-yard pass from Steve Grogan (John Smith kick). Patriots 14–13.

**Third quarter**

- BAL – Mike Wood 35-yard field goal. Colts 16–14.

**Fourth quarter**

- BAL – Randy McMillan 35-yard run (kick failed). Colts 22–14.
- NE – Don Calhoun 1-yard run (John Smith kick). Colts 22–21.
- BAL – Randy McMillan 2-yard run (Mike Wood kick). Colts 29–21.
- NE – Don Hasselbeck 4-yard pass from Steve Grogan (John Smith kick). Colts 29–28.

**Top passers**

- BAL – Bert Jones – 12/20, 113 yards
- NE – Steve Grogan – 14/27, 261 yards, 2 TD, 2 INT

**Top rushers**

- BAL – Randy McMillan – 16 rushes, 146 yards, 2 TD
- NE – Tony Collins – 15 rushes, 81 yards

**Top receivers**

- BAL – Roger Carr – 2 receptions, 34 yards
- NE – Don Hasselbeck – 6 receptions, 111 yards, TD

Statistics	BAL	NE
First downs	21	22
Total yards	346	388
Rushing yards	249	114
Net passing yards	97	274
Sacked–yards	2–16	3–11
Turnovers	1	3
Penalties–yards	10–75	8–84

==== Week 2: vs. Buffalo Bills ====
Week 2: Buffalo Bills at Baltimore Colts – Game summary

Quarter	1	2	3	4	Total
**Bills**	7	14	7	7	**35**
Colts	0	3	0	0	**3**

at Memorial Stadium, Baltimore, Maryland

- Date: September 13
- Game time: 2:00 p.m. EDT
- Game weather: Partly cloudy, 78 °F (26 °C)
- Game attendance: 45,772
- Box score

Game information

**First quarter**

- BUF – Joe Cribbs 33-yard pass from Joe Ferguson (Nick Mike-Mayer kick). Bills 7–0.

**Second quarter**

- BAL – Mike Wood 22-yard field goal. Bills 7–3.
- BUF – Jerry Butler 54-yard pass from Joe Ferguson (Nick Mike-Mayer kick). Bills 14–3.
- BUF – Mark Brammer 5-yard pass from Joe Ferguson (Nick Mike-Mayer kick). Bills 21–3.

**Third quarter**

- BUF – Buster Barnett 3-yard pass from Joe Ferguson (Nick Mike-Mayer kick). Bills 28–3.

**Fourth quarter**

- BUF – Roland Hooks 5-yard run (Nick Mike-Mayer kick). Bills 35–3.

**Top passers**

- BUF – Joe Ferguson – 16/28, 261 yards, 4 TD, INT
- BAL – Greg Landry – 7/17, 90 yards, INT

**Top rushers**

- BUF – Joe Cribbs – 17 rushes, 66 yards
- BAL – Curtis Dickey – 14 rushes, 35 yards

**Top receivers**

- BUF – Frank Lewis – 4 receptions, 82 yards
- BAL – Roger Carr – 4 receptions, 50 yards

Statistics	BUF	BAL
First downs	26	11
Total yards	430	147
Rushing yards	169	73
Net passing yards	261	74
Sacked–yards	0–0	5–46
Turnovers	3	3
Penalties–yards	9–65	1–5

==== Week 3: at Denver Broncos ====
Week 3: Baltimore Colts at Denver Broncos – Game summary

Quarter	1	2	3	4	Total
Colts	0	0	10	0	**10**
**Broncos**	0	14	14	0	**28**

at Mile High Stadium, Denver, Colorado

- Date: September 20
- Game time: 4:00 p.m. EDT/2:00 p.m. MDT
- Game weather: Sunny, 70 °F (21 °C)
- Game attendance: 74,804
- Box score

Game information

**First quarter**

- No scoring plays

**Second quarter**

- DEN – Ron Egloff 7-yard pass from Craig Morton (Fred Steinfort kick). Broncos 7–0.
- DEN – Steve Watson 29-yard pass from Craig Morton (Fred Steinfort kick). Broncos 14–0.

**Third quarter**

- BAL – Mike Wood 21-yard field goal. Broncos 14–3.
- BAL – Curtis Dickey 63-yard run (Mike Wood kick). Broncos 14–10.
- DEN – Steve Watson 18-yard pass from Craig Morton (Fred Steinfort kick). Broncos 21–10.
- DEN – Steve Watson 48-yard pass from Craig Morton (Fred Steinfort kick). Broncos 28–10.

**Fourth quarter**

- No scoring plays

**Top passers**

- BAL – Bert Jones – 7/19, 65 yards, INT
- DEN – Craig Morton – 20/28, 291 yards, 4 TD, 4 INT

**Top rushers**

- BAL – Curtis Dickey – 12 rushes, 115 yards, TD
- DEN – Rick Parros – 14 rushes, 65 yards

**Top receivers**

- BAL – Randy McMillan – 4 receptions, 29 yards
- DEN – Steve Watson – 7 receptions, 143 yards, 3 TD

Statistics	BAL	DEN
First downs	10	27
Total yards	209	442
Rushing yards	161	127
Net passing yards	48	315
Sacked–yards	2–17	3–26
Turnovers	3	4
Penalties–yards	8–63	9–65

==== Week 4: vs. Miami Dolphins ====
Week 4: Miami Dolphins at Baltimore Colts – Game summary

Quarter	1	2	3	4	Total
**Dolphins**	7	7	7	10	**31**
Colts	0	7	14	7	**28**

at Memorial Stadium, Baltimore, Maryland

- Date: September 27
- Game time: 2:00 p.m. EDT
- Game weather: Partly cloudy, 67 °F (19 °C)
- Game attendance: 41,630
- Box score

Game information

**First quarter**

- MIA – Tommy Vigorito 31-yard pass from David Woodley (Uwe von Schamann kick). Dolphins 7–0.

**Second quarter**

- MIA – Andra Franklin 10-yard run (Uwe von Schamann kick). Dolphins 14–0.
- BAL – Curtis Dickey 32-yard pass from Bert Jones (Mike Wood kick). Dolphins 14–7.

**Third quarter**

- BAL – Ray Butler 19-yard pass from Bert Jones (Mike Wood kick). Tied 14–14.
- MIA – Nick Giaquinto 14-yard pass from David Woodley (Uwe von Schamann kick). Dolphins 21–14.
- BAL – Ray Butler 67-yard pass from Bert Jones (Mike Wood kick). Tied 21–21.

**Fourth quarter**

- MIA – Andra Franklin 1-yard run (Uwe von Schamann kick). Dolphins 28–21.
- BAL – Curtis Dickey 1-yard run (Mike Wood kick). Tied 28–28.
- MIA – Uwe von Schamann 27-yard field goal. Dolphins 31–28.

**Top passers**

- MIA – David Woodley – 19/30, 309 yards, 2 TD
- BAL – Bert Jones – 20/27, 357 yards, 3 TD, INT

**Top rushers**

- MIA – Andra Franklin – 20 rushes, 76 yards, 2 TD
- BAL – Curtis Dickey – 13 rushes, 77 yards, TD

**Top receivers**

- MIA – Duriel Harris – 3 receptions, 73 yards
- BAL – Ray Butler – 4 receptions, 145 yards, 2 TD

Statistics	MIA	BAL
First downs	22	20
Total yards	428	514
Rushing yards	119	166
Net passing yards	309	348
Sacked–yards	0–0	1–9
Turnovers	0	1
Penalties–yards	4–35	6–52

==== Week 5: at Buffalo Bills ====
Week 5: Baltimore Colts at Buffalo Bills – Game summary

Quarter	1	2	3	4	Total
Colts	0	3	0	14	**17**
**Bills**	14	0	3	6	**23**

at Rich Stadium, Orchard Park, New York

- Date: October 4
- Game time: 1:00 p.m. EDT
- Game weather: Mostly cloudy, 47 °F (8 °C)
- Game attendance: 77,811
- Box score

Game information

**First quarter**

- BUF – Jerry Butler 16-yard pass from Joe Ferguson (Nick Mike-Mayer kick). Bills 7–0.
- BUF – Roosevelt Leaks 1-yard run (Nick Mike-Mayer kick). Bills 14–0.

**Second quarter**

- BAL – Mike Wood 32-yard field goal. Bills 14–3.

**Third quarter**

- BUF – Nick Mike-Mayer 34-yard field goal. Bills 17–3.

**Fourth quarter**

- BAL – Roger Carr 6-yard pass from Bert Jones (Mike Wood kick). Bills 17–10.
- BUF – Nick Mike-Mayer 44-yard field goal. Bills 20–10.
- BUF – Nick Mike-Mayer 45-yard field goal. Bills 23–10.
- BAL – Ray Butler 14-yard pass from Bert Jones (Nick Mike-Mayer kick). Bills 23–17.

**Top passers**

- BAL – Bert Jones – 22/36, 275 yards, 2 TD, INT
- BUF – Joe Ferguson – 14/29, 148 yards, TD, INT

**Top rushers**

- BAL – Curtis Dickey – 10 rushes, 78 yards
- BUF – Joe Cribbs – 17 rushes, 159 yards

**Top receivers**

- BAL – Curtis Dickey – 3 receptions, 80 yards
- BUF – Jerry Butler – 4 receptions, 73 yards, TD

Statistics	BAL	BUF
First downs	23	22
Total yards	378	366
Rushing yards	133	229
Net passing yards	245	137
Sacked–yards	4–30	1–11
Turnovers	2	1
Penalties–yards	10–55	7–49

==== Week 6: vs. Cincinnati Bengals ====
Week 6: Cincinnati Bengals at Baltimore Colts – Game summary

Quarter	1	2	3	4	Total
**Bengals**	3	14	7	17	**41**
Colts	0	5	0	14	**19**

at Memorial Stadium, Baltimore, Maryland

- Date: October 11
- Game time: 2:00 p.m. EDT
- Game weather: Mostly sunny, 53 °F (12 °C)
- Game attendance: 33,060
- Referee: Fred Wyant
- TV: NBC
- Box score

Game information

**First quarter**

- CIN – Jim Breech 38-yard field goal. Bengals 3–0.

**Second quarter**

- BAL – Pat McInally punt blocked out of end zone. Bengals 3–2.
- BAL – Mike Wood 19-yard field goal. Colts 5–3.
- CIN – Cris Collinsworth 18-yard pass from Ken Anderson (Jim Breech kick). Bengals 10–5.
- CIN – David Verser 20-yard pass from Ken Anderson (Jim Breech kick). Bengals 17–5.

**Third quarter**

- CIN – Dan Ross 2-yard pass from Ken Anderson (Jim Breech kick). Bengals 24–5.

**Fourth quarter**

- BAL – Cleveland Franklin 1-yard run (Mike Wood kick). Bengals 24–12.
- CIN – Jim Breech 24-yard field goal. Bengals 27–12.
- CIN – Pete Johnson 1-yard run (Jim Breech kick). Bengals 34–12.
- BAL – Reese McCall 65-yard pass from Bert Jones (Mike Wood kick). Bengals 34–19.
- CIN – Jimmy Hargrove 1-yard run (Jim Breech kick). Bengals 41–19.

**Top passer**

- CIN – Ken Anderson – 21/27, 257 yards, 3 TD
- BAL – Bert Jones – 22/30, 310 yards, TD, 2 INT

**Top rushers**

- CIN – Pete Johnson – 20 rushes, 75 yards, TD
- BAL – Zachary Dixon – 6 rushes, 23 yards

**Top receivers**

- CIN – Dan Ross – 7 receptions, 106 yards, TD
- BAL – Curtis Dickey – 11 receptions, 88 yards

Statistics	CIN	BAL
First downs	24	22
Total yards	378	350
Rushing yards	121	56
Net passing yards	257	294
Sacked–yards	0–0	4–42
Turnovers	0	4
Penalties–yards	5–54	6–51

==== Week 7: vs. San Diego Chargers ====
Week 7: San Diego Chargers at Baltimore Colts – Game summary

Quarter	1	2	3	4	Total
**Chargers**	7	16	7	13	**43**
Colts	7	0	7	0	**14**

at Memorial Stadium, Baltimore, Maryland

- Date: October 18
- Game time: 2:00 p.m. EDT
- Game weather: Cloudy, 53 °F (12 °C)
- Game attendance: 41,921
- Referee: Bob McElwee
- TV announcers (NBC): Phil Stone and Gene Washington
- Box score

Game information
- BAL – Roger Carr 29-yard pass from Bert Jones (Mike Wood kick). Colts 7–0.
- SD – Chuck Muncie 3-yard run (Rolf Benirschke kick). Tied 7–7.

**Second quarter**

- SD – John Cappelletti 12-yard pass from Dan Fouts (kick field). Chargers 13–7.
- SD – Charlie Joiner 23-yard pass from Dan Fouts (Rolf Benirschke kick). Chargers 20–7.
- SD – Rolf Benirschke 30-yard field goal. Chargers 23–7.

**Third quarter**

- SD – Chuck Muncie 3-yard run (Rolf Benirschke kick). Chargers 30–7.
- BAL – Curtis Dickey 5-yard pass from Bert Jones (Mike Wood kick). Chargers 30–14.

**Fourth quarter**

- SD – John Cappelletti 1-yard run (kick failed). Chargers 36–14.
- SD – Clarence Williams 7-yard pass from Dan Fouts (Rolf Benirschke kick). Chargers 43–14.

**Top passers**

- SD – Dan Fouts – 26/43, 298 yards, 3 TD
- BAL – Bert Jones – 20/37, 255 yards, 2 TD, 2 INT

**Top rushers**

- SD – James Brooks – 14 rushes, 72 yards
- BAL – Curtis Dickey – 6 rushes, 32 yards

**Top receivers**

- SD – Charlie Joiner – 6 receptions, 82 yards, TD
- BAL – Roger Carr – 3 receptions, 63 yards, TD

Statistics	SD	BAL
First downs	30	18
Total yards	470	264
Rushing yards	172	68
Net passing yards	298	196
Sacked–yards	0–0	6–59
Turnovers	1	3
Penalties–yards	6–30	5–45

==== Week 8: at Cleveland Browns ====
Week 8: Baltimore Colts at Cleveland Browns – Game summary

Quarter	1	2	3	4	Total
Colts	0	7	14	7	**28**
**Browns**	7	21	7	7	**42**

at Cleveland Municipal Stadium, Cleveland, Ohio

- Date: October 25
- Game time: 1:00 p.m. EST
- Game weather: Partly cloudy, 40 °F (4 °C)
- Game attendance: 78,986
- Box score

Game information

**First quarter**

- CLE – Ozzie Newsome 1-yard pass from Brian Sipe (Matt Bahr kick). Browns 7–0.

**Second quarter**

- CLE – Greg Pruitt 22-yard pass from Brian Sipe (Matt Bahr kick). Browns 14–0.
- CLE – Dave Logan 40-yard pass from Brian Sipe (Matt Bahr kick). Browns 21–0.
- BAL – Curtis Dickey 3-yard pass from Bert Jones (Mike Wood kick). Browns 21–7.
- CLE – Charles White 2-yard run (Matt Bahr kick). Browns 28–7.

**Third quarter**

- BAL – Greg Landry 11-yard fumble return (Mike Wood kick). Browns 28–14.
- BAL – Ray Butler 36-yard pass from Bert Jones (Mike Wood kick). Browns 28–21.
- CLE – Ricky Feacher 28-yard pass from Brian Sipe (Matt Bahr kick). Browns 35–21.

**Fourth quarter**

- BAL – Ray Butler 5-yard pass from Bert Jones (Mike Wood kick). Browns 35–28.
- CLE – Mike Pruitt 16-yard run (Matt Bahr kick). Browns 42–28.

**Top passers**

- BAL – Bert Jones – 17/37, 249 yards, 3 TD, 2 INT
- CLE – Brian Sipe – 30/41, 444 yards, 4 TD, 2 INT

**Top rushers**

- BAL – Randy McMillan – 14 rushes, 57 yards
- CLE – Mike Pruitt – 16 rushes, 87 yards, TD

**Top receivers**

- BAL – Roger Carr – 3 receptions, 58 yards
- CLE – Greg Pruitt – 9 receptions, 104 yards, TD

Statistics	BAL	CLE
First downs	18	30
Total yards	357	562
Rushing yards	118	131
Net passing yards	239	431
Sacked–yards	2–10	1–13
Turnovers	3	6
Penalties–yards	5–33	6–56

==== Week 9: at Miami Dolphins ====
Week 9: Baltimore Colts at Miami Dolphins – Game summary

Quarter	1	2	3	4	Total
Colts	0	10	0	0	**10**
**Dolphins**	7	7	10	3	**27**

at Miami Orange Bowl, Miami, Florida

- Date: November 1
- Game time: 1:00 p.m. EST
- Game weather: Mostly sunny, 78 °F (26 °C)
- Game attendance: 46,061
- Box score

Game information

**First quarter**

- MIA – David Woodley 3-yard run (Uwe von Schamann kick). Dolphins 7–0.

**Second quarter**

- BAL – Don McCauley 5-yard pass from Bert Jones (Mike Wood kick). Tied 7–7.
- MIA – Duriel Harris 22-yard pass from David Woodley (Uwe von Schamann kick). Dolphins 14–7.
- BAL – Mike Wood 44-yard field goal. Dolphins 14–10.

**Third quarter**

- MIA – Uwe von Schamann 41-yard field goal. Dolphins 17–10.
- MIA – Ronnie Lee 7-yard pass from David Woodley (Uwe von Schamann kick). Dolphins 24–10.

**Fourth quarter**

- MIA – Uwe von Schamann 32-yard field goal. Dolphins 27–10.

**Top passers**

- BAL – Bert Jones – 23/37, 248 yards, TD, 2 INT
- MIA – David Woodley – 14/25, 164 yards, 2 TD

**Top rushers**

- BAL – Curtis Dickey – 9 rushes, 31 yards
- MIA – Andra Franklin – 23 rushes, 101 yards

**Top receivers**

- BAL – Randy McMillan – 9 receptions, 78 yards
- MIA – Bruce Hardy – 4 receptions, 54 yards

Statistics	BAL	MIA
First downs	19	19
Total yards	308	310
Rushing yards	68	146
Net passing yards	240	164
Sacked–yards	1–8	0–0
Turnovers	3	0
Penalties–yards	7–58	6–55

==== Week 10: vs. New York Jets ====
Week 10: New York Jets at Baltimore Colts – Game summary

Quarter	1	2	3	4	Total
**Jets**	10	14	7	10	**41**
Colts	7	7	0	0	**14**

at Memorial Stadium, Baltimore, Maryland

- Date: November 8
- Game time: 4:00 p.m. EST
- Game weather: Clear, 49 °F (9 °C)
- Game attendance: 31,521
- Box score

Game information

**First quarter**

- NYJ – Pat Leahy 25-yard field goal. Jets 3–0.
- BAL – Randy McMillan 2-yard pass from Bert Jones (Mike Wood kick). Colts 7–3.
- NYJ – Wesley Walker 34-yard pass from Richard Todd (Pat Leahy kick). Jets 10–7.

**Second quarter**

- BAL – Randy McMillan 1-yard run (Mike Wood kick). Colts 14–10.
- NYJ – Mike Augustyniak 1-yard run (Pat Leahy kick). Jets 17–14.
- NYJ – Lam Jones 25-yard pass from Richard Todd (Pat Leahy kick). Jets 24–14.

**Third quarter**

- NYJ – Kevin Long 1-yard pass from Richard Todd (Pat Leahy kick). Jets 31–14.

**Fourth quarter**

- NYJ – Bruce Harper 3-yard run (Pat Leahy kick). Jets 38–14.
- NYJ – Pat Leahy 41-yard field goal. Jets 41–14.

**Top passers**

- NYJ – Richard Tod – 21/31, 277 yards, 3 TD
- BAL – Bert Jones – 24/33, 243 yards, TD, INT

**Top rushers**

- NYJ – Bruce Harper – 10 rushes, 44 yards, TD
- BAL – Zachary Dixon – 9 rushes, 54 yards

**Top receivers**

- NYJ – Wesley Walker – 3 receptions, 94 yards, TD
- BAL – Randy McMillan – 11 receptions, 68 yards, TD

Statistics	NYJ	BAL
First downs	28	21
Total yards	393	332
Rushing yards	122	114
Net passing yards	271	218
Sacked–yards	1–6	2–25
Turnovers	0	2
Penalties–yards	4–25	6–74

==== Week 11: at Philadelphia Eagles ====
Week 11: Baltimore Colts at Philadelphia Eagles – Game summary

Quarter	1	2	3	4	Total
Colts	6	0	0	7	**13**
**Eagles**	7	14	10	7	**38**

at Veterans Stadium, Philadelphia, Pennsylvania

- Date: November 15
- Game time: 1:00 p.m. EST
- Game weather: Partly cloudy, 51 °F (11 °C)
- Game attendance: 68,618
- Box score

Game information

**First quarter**

- PHI – Keith Krepfle 15-yard pass from Ron Jaworski (Tony Franklin kick). Eagles 7–0.
- BAL – Curtis Dickey 1-yard run (kick failed). Eagles 7–6.

**Second quarter**

- PHI – Wilbert Montgomery 5-yard run (Tony Franklin kick). Eagles 14–6.
- PHI – Wilbert Montgomery 1-yard run (Tony Franklin kick). Eagles 21–6.

**Third quarter**

- PHI – Tony Franklin 32-yard field goal. Eagles 24–6.
- PHI – Charlie Smith 30-yard pass from Ron Jaworski (Tony Franklin kick). Eagles 31–6.

**Fourth quarter**

- BAL – Zachary Dixon 17-yard pass from Bert Jones (Mike Wood kick). Eagles 31–13.
- PHI – Wally Henry 44-yard pass from Joe Pisarcik (Tony Franklin kick). Eagles 38–13.

**Top passers**

- BAL – Bert Jones – 8/17, 93 yards, TD, INT
- PHI – Ron Jaworski – 19/29, 294 yards, 2 TD, INT

**Top rushers**

- BAL – Curtis Dickey – 6 rushes, 17 yards, TD
- PHI – Wilbert Montgomery – 22 rushes, 115 yards, 2 TD

**Top receivers**

- BAL – Ray Butler – 3 receptions, 54 yards
- PHI – Harold Carmichael – 7 receptions, 93 yards

Statistics	BAL	PHI
First downs	9	34
Total yards	208	574
Rushing yards	36	235
Net passing yards	172	339
Sacked–yards	0–0	1–13
Turnovers	2	2
Penalties–yards	7–53	6–45

==== Week 12: vs. St. Louis Cardinals ====
Week 12: St. Louis Cardinals at Baltimore Colts – Game summary

Quarter	1	2	3	4	Total
**Cardinals**	14	7	7	7	**35**
Colts	10	0	7	7	**24**

at Memorial Stadium, Baltimore, Maryland

- Date: November 22
- Game time: 2:00 p.m. EST
- Game weather: Partly cloudy, 39 °F (4 °C)
- Game attendance: 24,784
- Box score

Game information

**First quarter**

- STL – Ottis Anderson 4-yard run (Neil O'Donoghue kick). Cardinals 7–0.
- BAL – Curtis Dickey 36-yard run (Mike Wood kick). Tied 7–7.
- STL – Dave Ahrens 14-yard interception return (Neil O'Donoghue kick). Cardinals 14–7.
- BAL – Mike Wood 40-yard field goal. Cardinals 14–10.

**Second quarter**

- STL – Neil Lomax 10-yard run (Neil O'Donoghue kick). Cardinals 21–10.

**Third quarter**

- BAL – Roger Carr 5-yard pass from Bert Jones (Mike Wood kick). Cardinals 21–17.
- STL – Wayne Morris 3-yard run (Neil O'Donoghue kick). Cardinals 28–17.

**Fourth quarter**

- BAL – Ray Butler 8-yard pass from Bert Jones (Mike Wood kick). Cardinals 28–24.
- STL – Ottis Anderson 11-yard run (Neil O'Donoghue kick). Cardinals 35–24.

**Top passers**

- STL – Neil Lomax – 12/21, 219 yards
- BAL – Bert Jones – 23/45, 230 yards, 2 TD, 2 INT

**Top rushers**

- STL – Ottis Anderson – 29 rushes, 130 yards, 2 TD
- BAL – Zachary Dixon – 12 rushes, 64 yards

**Top receivers**

- STL – Pat Tilley – 5 receptions, 158 yards
- BAL – Randy McMillan – 4 receptions, 59 yards

Statistics	STL	BAL
First downs	24	22
Total yards	452	385
Rushing yards	241	155
Net passing yards	211	230
Sacked–yards	1–8	0–0
Turnovers	3	2
Penalties–yards	7–60	6–54

==== Week 13: at New York Jets ====
Week 13: Baltimore Colts at New York Jets – Game summary

Quarter	1	2	3	4	Total
Colts	0	0	0	0	**0**
**Jets**	7	6	9	3	**25**

at Shea Stadium, Flushing, New York

- Date: November 29
- Game time: 1:00 p.m. EST
- Game weather: Partly cloudy, 42 °F (6 °C)
- Game attendance: 53,593
- Box score

Game information

**First quarter**

- NJY – Freeman McNeil 30-yard run (Pat Leahy kick). Jets 7–0.

**Second quarter**

- NYJ – Pat Leahy 37-yard field goal. Jets 10–0.
- NYJ – Pat Leahy 22-yard field goal. Jets 13–0.

**Third quarter**

- NYJ – Freeman Mcneil 1-yard run (kick failed). Jets 19–0.
- NYJ – Pat Leahy 27-yard field goal. Jets 22–0.

**Fourth quarter**

- NYJ – Pat Leahy 27-yard field goal. Jets 25–0.

**Top passers**

- BAL – Bert Jones – 10/24, 142 yards, INT
- NYJ – Richard Todd – 16/28, 143 yards

**Top rushers**

- BAL – Zachary Dixon – 12 rushes, 22 yards
- NYJ – Freeman McNeil – 24 rushes, 93 yards, 2 TD

**Top receivers**

- BAL – Ray Butler – 5 receptions, 88 yards
- NYJ – Bobby Jones – 4 receptions, 46 yards

Statistics	BAL	NYJ
First downs	11	22
Total yards	152	300
Rushing yards	49	161
Net passing yards	103	139
Sacked–yards	5–39	1–4
Turnovers	1	0
Penalties–yards	9–82	6–40

==== Week 14: vs. Dallas Cowboys ====
Week 14: Dallas Cowboys at Baltimore Colts – Game summary

Quarter	1	2	3	4	Total
**Cowboys**	17	10	0	10	**37**
Colts	6	0	7	0	**13**

at Memorial Stadium, Baltimore, Maryland

- Date: December 6
- Game time: 2:00 p.m. EST
- Game weather: Cold, 39 °F (4 °C), wind chill 29 °F (−2 °C)
- Game attendance: 54,871
- Referee: Ben Dreith
- TV announcers (CBS): Jim Kelly and John Dockery
- Box score

Game information

**First quarter**

- DAL – Ron Springs 1-yard run (Rafael Septién kick). Cowboys 7–0.
- DAL – Rafael Septién 42-yard field goal. Cowboys 10–0.
- DAL – Ron Springs 2-yard run (Rafael Septién kick). Cowboys 17–0.
- BAL – Curtis Dickey 20-yard run (kick failed). Cowboys 17–6.

**Second quarter**

- DAL – Ron Springs 2-yard pass from Glenn Carano (Rafael Septién kick). Cowboys 24–6.
- DAL – Rafael Septién 35-yard field goal. Cowboys 27–6.

**Third quarter**

- BAL – Curtis Dickey 20-yard run (Mike Wood kick). Cowboys 27–13.

**Fourth quarter**

- DAL – Rafael Septién 31-yard field goal. Cowboys 30–13.
- DAL – James Jones 59-yard run (Rafael Septién kick). Cowboys 37–13.

**Top passers**

- DAL – Drew Pearson – 1/1, 59 yards
- BAL – David Humm – 7/24, 90 yards, 2 INT

**Top rushers**

- DAL – Tony Dorsett – 30 rushes, 175 yards
- BAL – Curtis Dickey – 15 rushes, 130 yards, 2 TD

**Top receivers**

- DAL – Tony Hill – 2 receptions, 69 yards
- BAL – Ray Butler – 3 receptions, 40 yards

Statistics	DAL	BAL
First downs	29	9
Total yards	464	238
Rushing yards	354	156
Net passing yards	110	82
Sacked–yards	0–0	1–8
Turnovers	2	3
Penalties–yards	6–33	11–87

==== Week 15: at Washington Redskins ====
Week 15: Baltimore Colts at Washington Redskins – Game summary

Quarter	1	2	3	4	Total
Colts	7	0	7	0	**14**
**Redskins**	7	21	10	0	**38**

at RFK Stadium, Washington, D. C.

- Date: December 13
- Game time: 1:00 p.m. EST
- Game weather: Cloudy, 35 °F (2 °C)
- Game attendance: 46,706
- Box score

Game information

**First quarter**

- WAS – Virgil Seay 38-yard pass from Joe Theismann (Mark Moseley kick). Redskins 7–0.
- BAL – Ray Butler 10-yard pass from Bert Jones (Mike Wood kick). Tied 7–7.

**Second quarter**

- WAS – John Riggins 8-yard run (Mark Moseley kick). Redskins 14–7.
- WAS – John Riggins 14-yard run (Mark Moseley kick). Redskins 21–7.
- WAS – Joe Theismann 8-yard run (Mark Moseley kick). Redskins 28–7.

**Third quarter**

- WAS – Art Monk 13-yard pass from Joe Theismann (Mark Moseley kick). Redskins 35–7.
- BAL – Reese McCall 6-yard pass from Bert Jones (Mike Wood kick). Redskins 35–14.
- WAS – Mark Moseley 32-yard field goal. Redskins 38–14.

**Fourth quarter**

- No scoring plays

**Top passers**

- BAL – Bert Jones – 14/25, 217 yards, 2 TD, 2 INT
- WAS – Joe Theismann – 23/36, 339 yards, 2 TD, INT

**Top rushers**

- BAL – Curtis Dickey – 17 rushes, 56 yards
- WAS – Joe Washington – 20 rushes, 73 yards

**Top receivers**

- BAL – Roger Carr – 6 receptions, 114 yards
- WAS – Art Monk – 7 receptions, 148 yards, TD

Statistics	BAL	WAS
First downs	21	27
Total yards	337	486
Rushing yards	120	147
Net passing yards	217	339
Sacked–yards	1–0	0–0
Turnovers	2	1
Penalties–yards	3–73	6–60

==== Week 16: vs. New England Patriots ====
Week 16: New England Patriots at Baltimore Colts – Game summary

Quarter	1	2	3	4	Total
Patriots	7	7	0	7	**21**
**Colts**	10	7	6	0	**23**

at Memorial Stadium, Baltimore, Maryland

- Date: December 20
- Game time: 2:00 p.m. EST
- Game weather: Mostly sunny, 21 °F (−6 °C)
- Game attendance: 17,073
- Referee: Ben Dreith
- Box score

Game information

**First quarter**

- BAL – Mike Wood 30-yard field goal. Colts 3–0.
- NE – Sam Cunningham 4-yard run (John Smith kick). Patriots 7–3.
- BAL – Don McCauley 5-yard pass from Bert Jones (Mike Wood kick). Colts 10–7.

**Second quarter**

- NE – Don Westbrook 15-yard pass from Tom Owen (John Smith kick). Patriots 14–10.
- BAL – Ray Butler 53-yard pass from Bert Jones (Mike Wood kick). Colts 17–14.

**Third quarter**

- BAL – Ray Butler 37-yard pass from Bert Jones (kick failed). Colts 23–14.

**Fourth quarter**

- NE – Don Westbrook 2-yard pass from Matt Cavanaugh (John Smith kick). Colts 23–21.

**Top passers**

- NE – Matt Cavanaugh – 11/16, 145 yards, TD
- BAL – Bert Jones – 17/28, 267 yards, 3 TD, INT

**Top rushers**

- NE – Don Calhoun – 9 rushes, 34 yards
- BAL – Zachary Dixon – 13 rushes, 52 yards

**Top receivers**

- NE – Harold Jackson – 4 receptions, 71 yards
- BAL – Ray Butler – 2 receptions, 90 yards, 2 TD

Statistics	NE	BAL
First downs	20	19
Total yards	350	383
Rushing yards	77	128
Net passing yards	273	255
Sacked–yards	1–8	1–12
Turnovers	4	2
Penalties–yards	6–20	6–53

The Colts ended the 1981 season by snapping their 14-game losing streak and swept the Patriots. However, the win would cause the Colts to lose out on the first overall pick in the following draft, which would go to the Patriots, and the Colts would secure the second overall pick instead.

=== Standings ===
AFC East
	W	L	T	PCT	DIV	CONF	PF	PA	STK
^{(2)} Miami Dolphins	11	4	1	.719	5–2–1	8–3–1	345	275	W4
^{(4)} New York Jets	10	5	1	.656	6–1–1	8–5–1	355	287	W2
^{(5)} Buffalo Bills	10	6	0	.625	6–2	9–3	311	276	L1
Baltimore Colts	2	14	0	.125	2–6	2–10	259	533	W1
New England Patriots	2	14	0	.125	0–8	2–10	322	370	L9

== Records set ==
- Most Points Allowed, Season, 533
- Worst Point Differential, 16-game season, -274
- Most First-Half Points Allowed, 16-game season, 307
- Most Touchdowns Allowed, Season, 68
- Most First Downs Allowed Season, 406
- Fewest Punt Returns, Season, 12

== See also ==
- History of the Indianapolis Colts
- Indianapolis Colts seasons
- Colts–Patriots rivalry
- List of organizational conflicts in the NFL
