= 1982 Baltimore Colts season =

30th season in franchise history; second winless season since AFL/NFL merger

- Owner: Robert Irsay
- General manager: Ernie Accorsi
- Head coach: Frank Kush
- Home stadium: Memorial Stadium

Results
- Record: 0–8–1
- Conference place: 14th AFC
- Playoffs: Did not qualify
- Pro Bowlers: None

The 1982 Baltimore Colts season was the 30th season for the team in the National Football League (NFL), and the Colts’ penultimate season in Baltimore. It was their first under former Arizona State coach Frank Kush, who was hired to replace Mike McCormack after he recorded a 2–14 record in 1981.

The Colts finished the NFL's strike-shortened 1982 season without a victory, finishing with eight losses and one tie in their nine games. The Colts became the third team since the league’s expansion era began in 1960, after the 1960 Dallas Cowboys and the 1976 Tampa Bay Buccaneers, and the second team since the AFL-NFL merger to finish a regular season winless. Since then, the 2008 Detroit Lions and the 2017 Cleveland Browns have posted winless seasons; the Colts are the only one of these five teams that did not do so in a full, uninterrupted season (the Cowboys played twelve games, the Buccaneers fourteen, and the Lions and Browns sixteen, as per the league standards of the time). The Colts are also the only winless team to not have a winning percentage of .000 due to the tie giving them a percentage of .056 which is the worst non-zero win percentage for a team in post-1900s North American sports history. It would be the final season the Colts tied a game for 40 years. This record is only breakable by an NFL team going 0–16–1 (.029) in a season, an MLB team going 8–154 or worse, an NBA team going 4–78 or worse, or by an NHL team finishing with 9 points or fewer.

As mentioned above, the NFL's 1982 season was disrupted by a strike by the league's players. In the Colts’ first game after the end of the strike on November 21, they were shut out by the New York Jets 37–0. The following week, they were shut out by the Buffalo Bills 20–0, in a game in which the Colts’ offense never crossed the 50-yard line. Nevertheless, the week after that, they lost by only three points to the playoff-bound and defending AFC champion Cincinnati Bengals.

== Offseason ==
=== NFL draft ===
1982 Baltimore Colts draft
Round	Pick	Player	Position	College	Notes
1	2	Johnie Cooks	Linebacker	Mississippi State	
1	4	Art Schlichter	Quarterback	Ohio State	from L. A. Rams
2	28	Leo Wisniewski	Nose tackle	Penn State	
2	34	Rohn Stark *	Punter	Florida State	from L. A. Rams
3	57	Jim Burroughs	Cornerback	Michigan State	
4	84	Mike Pagel	Quarterback	Arizona State	
5	113	Terry Crouch	Guard	Oklahoma	
6	140	Pat Beach	Tight end	Washington State	
7	169	Fletcher Jenkins	Defensive tackle	Washington	
8	196	Tony Loia	Guard	Arizona State	
9	225	Tony Berryhill	Center	Clemson	
10	252	Tom Deery	Safety	Widener	
11	280	Lamont Meacham	Defensive back	Western Kentucky	
12	307	Johnnie Wright	Running back	South Carolina	
Made roster * Made at least one Pro Bowl during career

=== Undrafted free agents ===
1982 undrafted free agents of note
Player	Position	College
Bernard Henry	Wide Receiver	Arizona State

== Personnel ==
=== Staff ===
1982 Baltimore Colts staff
Front office: President and Treasurer – Robert Irsay; General manager – Ernie Accorsi; Director of Pro Personnel – Bob Terpening; Head coaches: Head coach – Frank Kush; Offensive coaches: Offensive Coordinator/Quarterbacks – Zeke Bratkowski; Running Backs – Roger Theder; Receivers – Richard Mann; Offensive Line – Hal Hunter; Assistant Offensive Line – Mike Westhoff	Defensive coaches: Defensive Coordinator – Bud Carson; Defensive Line – Gunther Cunningham; Linebackers – Rick Venturi; Secondary – Bob Valesente; Special teams coaches: Special Teams – Bob Valesente

=== Roster ===
1982 Baltimore Colts roster
Quarterbacks (QB): 11 David Humm; 18 Mike Pagel; 10 Art Schlichter; Running backs (RB): 33 Curtis Dickey; 31 Zachary Dixon; 28 Cleveland Franklin; 32 Randy McMillan; 38 Johnnie Wright; Wide receivers (WR): 87 Elmer Bailey; 85 Matt Bouza; 80 Ray Butler; 88 Bernard Henry; 84 Holden Smith; Tight ends (TE): 81 Pat Beach; 86 Reese McCall; 83 Tim Sherwin	Offensive linemen (OL): 75 Terry Crouch G; 53 Ray Donaldson C; 68 Jeff Hart T; 63 Nat Hudson G; 62 Ken Huff G; 78 Greg Murtha T; 79 John Sinnott T; 64 Ben Utt T/G; Defensive linemen (DL): 73 Cleveland Crosby DE; 72 Steve Durham DE; 92 James Hunter DE; 94 Fletcher Jenkins DE; 99 Donnell Thompson DE; 69 Leo Wisniewski NT	Linebackers (LB): 52 Greg Bracelin OLB; 98 Johnie Cooks ILB; 50 Joe Harris ILB; 57 Mike Humiston ILB; 51 Ricky Jones OLB; 55 Barry Krauss ILB; 49 Cliff Odom ILB; 90 Gary Padjen ILB; 54 Sanders Shiver OLB; 60 Dave Simmons OLB; Defensive backs (DB): 26 Kim Anderson FS; 30 Larry Anderson SS; 45 Jim Burroughs CB; 25 Nesby Glasgow FS; 42 Derrick Hatchett CB; 27 Darryl Hemphill SS; 48 Lamont Meacham CB; Special teams (ST): 1 Dan Miller K; 3 Rohn Stark P	Reserve: 34 Jeff Delaney S (IR); -- Tim Foley T (PUP); 72 Mike Fultz NT (IR); 44 Sid Justin CB (IR); -- Jimmy Moore G (PUP); 71 Mike Ozdowski DE (IR); 93 Harry Stanback DE (IR); -- Hosea Taylor DE (IR); -- Kendall Williams CB (Left squad); Rookies in italics

== Regular season ==
=== Schedule ===
Week	Date	Opponent	Result	Record	Venue	Attendance
1	September 12	**New England Patriots**	**L** 13–24	0–1	Memorial Stadium	39,055
2	September 19	at **Miami Dolphins**	**L** 20–24	0–2	Miami Orange Bowl	51,999
NFLPA strike
3	November 21	at **New York Jets**	**L** 0–37	0–3	Shea Stadium	46,970
4	November 28	at **Buffalo Bills**	**L** 0–20	0–4	Rich Stadium	33,985
5	December 5	Cincinnati Bengals	**L** 17–20	0–5	Memorial Stadium	23,598
6	December 12	at Minnesota Vikings	**L** 10–13	0–6	Metrodome	53,981
7	December 19	Green Bay Packers	**T** 20–20 (OT)	0–6–1	Memorial Stadium	25,920
8	December 26	at San Diego Chargers	**L** 26–44	0–7–1	Jack Murphy Stadium	49,711
9	January 2, 1983	**Miami Dolphins**	**L** 7–34	0–8–1	Memorial Stadium	19,073
Note: Intra-division opponents are in **bold** text.

=== Game summaries ===
==== Week 1: vs. New England Patriots ====
Week 1: New England Patriots at Baltimore Colts – Game summary

Quarter	1	2	3	4	Total
**Patriots**	3	7	7	7	**24**
Colts	3	7	3	0	**13**

at Memorial Stadium, Baltimore, Maryland

- Date: September 12
- Game time: 2:00 p.m. EDT
- Game weather: 73 °F (23 °C)
- Game attendance: 39,055
- Box score

Game information

**First quarter**

- BAL – Mike Wood 49-yard field goal. Colts 3–0.
- NE – Rex Robinson 24-yard field goal. Tied 3–3.

**Second quarter**

- BAL – Mike Pagel 1-yard run (Mike Wood kick). Colts 10–3.
- NE – Tony Collins 15-yard pass from Matt Cavanaugh (Rex Robinson kick). Tied 10–10.

**Third quarter**

- BAL – Mike Wood 30-yard field goal. Colts 13–10.
- NE – Ken Toler 30-yard pass from Matt Cavanaugh (Rex Robinson kick). Patriots 17–13.

**Fourth quarter**

- NE – Robert Weathers 1-yard run (Rex Robinson kick). Patriots 24–13.

**Top passers**

- NE – Matt Cavanaugh – 7/16, 103 yards, 2 TD, INT
- BAL – Art Schlichter – 6/18, 103 yards, INT

**Top rushers**

- NE – Tony Collins – 21 rushes, 137 yards
- BAL – Zachary Dixon – 8 rushes, 47 yards

**Top receivers**

- NE – Tony Collins – 4 receptions, 56 yards, TD
- BAL – Matt Bouza – 6 receptions, 76 yards

==== Week 2: at Miami Dolphins ====
Week 2: Baltimore Colts at Miami Dolphins – Game summary

Quarter	1	2	3	4	Total
Colts	0	17	0	3	**20**
**Dolphins**	14	0	10	0	**24**

at Miami Orange Bowl, Miami, Florida

- Date: September 19
- Game time: 4:00 p.m. EDT
- Game weather: 83 °F (28 °C)
- Game attendance: 51,999
- Referee: Pat Haggerty
- TV announcers (NBC): Gary Gerould and Jim Turner
- Box score

Game information

**First quarter**

- MIA – David Woodley 1-yard run (Uwe von Schamann kick). Dolphins 7–0.
- MIA – Bruce Hardy 4-yard pass from David Woodley (Uwe von Schamann kick). Dolphins 14–0.

**Second quarter**

- BAL – Ray Butler 53-yard pass from Mike Pagel (Mike Wood kick). Dolphins 14–7.
- BAL – Mike Wood 51-yard field goal. Dolphins 14–10.
- BAL – Barry Krauss 5-yard pass from Mike Wood (Mike Wood kick). Colts 17–14.

**Third quarter**

- MIA – Tommy Vigorito 33-yard run (Uwe von Schamann kick). Dolphins 21–17.
- MIA – Uwe von Schamann 29-yard field goal. Dolphins 24–17.

**Fourth quarter**

- BAL – Mike Wood 48-yard field goal. Dolphins 24–20.

**Top passers**

- BAL – Mike Pagel – 8/16, 124 yards, TD
- MIA – David Woodley – 16/25, 180 yards, TD

**Top rushers**

- BAL – Zachary Dixon – 20 rushes, 87 yards
- MIA – Tony Nathan – 14 rushes, 56 yards

**Top receivers**

- BAL – Ray Butler – 1 reception, 53 yards, TD
- MIA – Duriel Harris – 4 receptions, 78 yards

==== Week 3: at New York Jets ====
Week 3: Baltimore Colts at New York Jets – Game summary

Quarter	1	2	3	4	Total
Colts	0	0	0	0	**0**
**Jets**	10	17	7	3	**37**

at Shea Stadium, Flushing, New York

- Date: November 21
- Game time: 1:00 p.m. EST
- Game weather: 50 °F (10 °C)
- Game attendance: 46,970
- Referee: Fred Wyant
- TV announcers (NBC): Bob Costas and Bob Trumpy
- Box score

Game information

**First quarter**

- NYJ – Freeman McNeil 34-yard run (Pat Leahy kick). Jets 7–0.
- NYJ – Pat Leahy 43-yard field goal. Jets 10–0.

**Second quarter**

- NYJ – Mike Augustyniak 1-yard run (Pat Leahy kick). Jets 17–0.
- NYJ – Lam Jones 23-yard pass from Richard Todd (Pat Leahy kick). Jets 24–0.
- NYJ – Pat Leahy 37-yard field goal. Jets 27–0.

**Third quarter**

- NYJ – Freeman McNeil 32-yard pass from Richard Todd (Pat Leahy kick). Jets 34–0.

**Fourth quarter**

- NYJ – Pat Leahy 19-yard field goal. Jets 37–0.

**Top passers**

- BAL – Mike Pagel – 17/34, 230 yards, 2 INT
- NYJ – Richard Todd – 13/27, 231 yards, 2 TD

**Top rushers**

- BAL – Zachary Dixon – 10 rushes, 37 yards
- NYJ – Freeman McNeil – 22 rushes, 123 yards, TD

**Top receivers**

- BAL – Tim Sherwin – 5 receptions, 92 yards
- NYJ – Wesley Walker – 4 receptions, 84 yards

==== Week 4: at Buffalo Bills ====
Week 4: Baltimore Colts at Buffalo Bills – Game summary

Quarter	1	2	3	4	Total
Colts	0	0	0	0	**0**
**Bills**	3	14	0	3	**20**

at Rich Stadium, Orchard Park, New York

- Date: November 28
- Game time: 1:00 p.m. EST
- Game weather: 27 °F (−3 °C)
- Game attendance: 33,985
- Box score

Game information

**First quarter**

- BUF – Efren Herrera 47-yard field goal. Bills 3–0.

**Second quarter**

- BUF – Roosevelt Leaks 1-yard run (Efren Herrera kick). Bills 10–0.
- BUF – Roosevelt Leaks 1-yard run (Efren Herrera kick). Bills 17–0.

**Third quarter**

- No scoring plays

**Fourth quarter**

- BUF – Efren Herrera 41-yard field goal. Bills 20–0.

**Top passers**

- BAL – Mike Pagel – 3/17, 62 yards
- BUF – Joe Ferguson – 6/16, 63 yards

**Top rushers**

- BAL – Randy McMillan – 8 rushes, 16 yards
- BUF – Joe Cribbs – 20 rushes, 94 yards

**Top receivers**

- BAL – Curtis Dickey – 1 reception 25 yards
- BUF – Frank Lewis – 2 receptions, 32 yards

==== Week 5: vs. Cincinnati Bengals ====
Week 5: Cincinnati Bengals at Baltimore Colts – Game summary

Quarter	1	2	3	4	Total
**Bengals**	0	6	7	7	**20**
Colts	7	3	0	7	**17**

at Memorial Stadium, Baltimore, Maryland

- Date: December 5
- Game time: 4:00 p.m. EST
- Game weather: 61 °F (16 °C)
- Game attendance: 23,598
- Box score

Game information

**First quarter**

- BAL – Ray Butler 17-yard pass from Mike Pagel (Mike Wood kick). Colts 7–0.

**Second quarter**

- CIN – Steve Kreider 24-yard pass from Ken Anderson (kick failed). Colts 7–6.
- BAL – Mike Wood 33-yard field goal. Colts 10–6.

**Third quarter**

- CIN – M. L. Harris 1-yard pass from Ken Anderson (Jim Breech kick). Bengals 13–10.

**Fourth quarter**

- CIN – M. L. Harris 2-yard pass from Ken Anderson (Jim Breech kick). Bengals 20–10.
- BAL – Pat Beach 4-yard pass from Mike Pagel (Mike Wood kick). Bengals 20–17.

**Top passers**

- CIN – Ken Anderson – 22/29, 206 yards, 3 TD
- BAL – Mike Pagel – 11/20, 146 yards, 2 TD

**Top rushers**

- CIN – Pete Johnson – 21 rushes, 90 yards
- BAL – Curtis Dickey – 12 rushes, 66 yards

**Top receivers**

- CIN – Cris Collinsworth – 7 receptions, 79 yards
- BAL – Ray Butler – 2 receptions, 36 yards, TD

==== Week 6: at Minnesota Vikings ====
Week 6: Baltimore Colts at Minnesota Vikings – Game summary

Quarter	1	2	3	4	Total
Colts	0	3	7	0	**10**
**Vikings**	7	0	3	3	**13**

at Hubert H. Humphrey Metrodome, Minneapolis, Minnesota

- Date: December 12
- Game time: 1:00 p.m. EST/12:00 p.m. CST
- Game weather: None (played indoors)
- Game attendance: 53,981
- Referee: Jerry Markbreit
- Box score

Game information

**First quarter**

- MIN – Sammy White 24-yard pass from Tommy Kramer (Rick Danmeier kick). Vikings 7–0.

**Second quarter**

- BAL – Mike Wood 39-yard field goal. Vikings 7–3.

**Third quarter**

- BAL – Jim Burroughs 94-yard interception return (Mike Wood kick). Colts 10–7.
- MIN – Rick Danmeier 23-yard field goal. Tied 10–10.

**Fourth quarter**

- MIN – Rick Danmeier 40-yard field goal. Vikings 13–10.

**Top passers**

- BAL – Mike Pagel – 14/32, 116 yards, 2 INT
- MIN – Tommy Kramer – 19/35, 258 yards, TD, INT

**Top rushers**

- BAL – Curtis Dickey – 13 rushes, 42 yards
- MIN – Ted Brown – 20 rushes, 75 yards

**Top receivers**

- BAL – Randy McMillan – 5 receptions, 32 yards
- MIN – Sammy White – 3 receptions, 78 yards, TD

==== Week 7: vs. Green Bay Packers ====
Week 7: Green Bay Packers at Baltimore Colts – Game summary

Quarter	1	2	3	4	OT	Total
Packers	0	10	3	7	0	**20**
Colts	3	0	3	14	0	**20**

at Memorial Stadium, Baltimore, Maryland

- Date: December 19
- Game time: 2:00 p.m. EST
- Game weather: 29 °F (−2 °C)
- Game attendance: 25,920
- Box score

Game information

**First quarter**

- BAL – Dan Miller 23-yard field goal. Colts 3–0.

**Second quarter**

- GB – Jan Stenerud 40-yard field goal. Tied 3–3.
- GB – John Thompson 1-yard pass from Lynn Dickey (Jan Stenerud kick). Packers 10–3.

**Third quarter**

- BAL – Dan Miller 40-yard field goal. Packers 10–6.
- GB – Jan Stenerud 25-yard field goal. Packers 13–6.

**Fourth quarter**

- GB – Eddie Lee Ivery 1-yard run (Jan Stenerud kick). Packers 20–6.
- BAL – Matt Bouza 12-yard pass from Mike Pagel (Dan Miller kick). Packers 20–13.
- BAL – Randy McMillan 1-yard run (Dan Miller kick). Tied 20–20.

**Overtime**

- No scoring plays

**Top passers**

- GB – Lynn Dickey – 16/34, 213 yards, TD, INT
- BAL – Mike Pagel – 23/39, 211 yards, TD

**Top rushers**

- GB – Gerry Ellis – 11 rushes, 47 yards
- BAL – Curtis Dickey – 10 rushes, 39 yards

**Top receivers**

- GB – John Jefferson – 5 receptions, 101 yards
- BAL – Matt Bouza – 5 receptions, 73 yards, TD

==== Week 8: at San Diego Chargers ====
Week 8: Baltimore Colts at San Diego Chargers – Game summary

Quarter	1	2	3	4	Total
Colts	0	3	10	13	**26**
**Chargers**	7	16	14	7	**44**

at Jack Murphy Stadium, San Diego, California

- Date: December 26
- Game time: 4:00 p.m. EST/1:00 p.m. PST
- Game weather: 55 °F (13 °C)
- Game attendance: 49,711
- Referee: Fred Silva
- TV announcers (NBC): Charlie Jones and Len Dawson
- Box score

Game information

**First quarter**

- SD – Kellen Winslow 30-yard pass from Dan Fouts (Rolf Benirschke kick). Chargers 7–0.

**Second quarter**

- SD – Rolf Benirschke 45-yard field goal. Chargers 10–0.
- SD – Wes Chandler 41-yard pass from Dan Fouts (kick failed). Chargers 16–0.
- SD – Kellen Winslow 13-yard pass from Dan Fouts (Rolf Benirschke kick). Chargers 23–0.
- BAL – Dan Miller 46-yard field goal. Chargers 23–3.

**Third quarter**

- BAL – Matt Bouza 15-yard pass from Mike Pagel (Dan Miller kick). Chargers 23–10.
- BAL – Dan Miller 58-yard field goal. Chargers 23–13.
- SD – James Brooks 8-yard run (Rolf Benirschke kick). Chargers 30–13.
- SD – Wes Chandler 44-yard pass from Dan Fouts (Rolf Benirschke kick). Chargers 37–13.

**Fourth quarter**

- BAL – Curtis Dickey 1-yard run (pass failed). Chargers 37–19.
- SD – Kellen Winslow 28-yard pass from Dan Fouts (Rolf Benirschke kick). Chargers 44–19.
- BAL – Tim Sherwin 0-yard fumble return (Rolf Benirschke kick). Chargers 44–26.

**Top passers**

- BAL – Mike Pagel – 17/25, 186 yards, TD, INT
- SD – Dan Fouts – 18/30, 298 yards, 5 TD, INT

**Top rushers**

- BAL – Randy McMillan – 11 rushes, 39 yards
- SD – Chuck Muncie – 16 rushes, 126 yards

**Top receivers**

- BAL – Matt Bouza – 5 receptions, 72 yards, TD
- SD – Kellen Winslow – 7 receptions, 120 yards, 3 TD

==== Week 9: vs. Miami Dolphins ====
Week 9: Miami Dolphins at Baltimore Colts – Game summary

Quarter	1	2	3	4	Total
**Dolphins**	10	7	17	0	**34**
Colts	0	7	0	0	**7**

at Memorial Stadium, Baltimore, Maryland

- Date: January 2, 1983
- Game time: 2:00 p.m.
- Game weather: 37 °F (3 °C)
- Game attendance: 19,073
- Box score

Game information

**First quarter**

- MIA – Nat Moore 11-yard pass from David Woodley (Uwe von Schamann kick). Dolphins 7–0.
- MIA – Uwe von Schamann 34-yard field goal. Dolphins 10–0.

**Second quarter**

- BAL – Zacahry Dixon 11-yard run (Dan Miller kick). Dolphins 10–7.
- MIA – Jimmy Cefalo 34-yard pass from David Woodley (Uwe von Schamann kick). Dolphins 17–7.

**Third quarter**

- MIA – Andra Franklin 1-yard run (Uwe von Schamann kick). Dolphins 24–7.
- MIA – Uwe von Schamann 25-yard field goal. Dolphins 27–7.
- MIA – Bruce Hardy 4-yard pass from David Woodley (Uwe von Schamann kick). Dolphins 34–7.

**Fourth quarter**

- No scoring plays

**Top passers**

- MIA – David Woodley – 14/22, 239 yards, 3 TD
- BAL – Mike Pagel – 11/23, 135 yards, INT

**Top rushers**

- MIA – Andra Franklin – 19 rushes, 46 yards, TD
- BAL – Randy McMillan – 15 rushes, 67 yards

**Top receivers**

- MIA – Duriel Harris – 4 receptions, 83 yards
- BAL – Curtis Dickey – 3 receptions, 50 yards

=== Standings ===
AFC East
	W	L	T	PCT	DIV	CONF	PF	PA	STK
Miami Dolphins^{(2)}	7	2	0	.778	6–1	6–1	198	131	W3
New York Jets^{(6)}	6	3	0	.667	2–2	2–3	245	166	L1
New England Patriots^{(7)}	5	4	0	.556	3–1	5–3	143	157	W1
Buffalo Bills	4	5	0	.444	1–3	3–3	150	154	L3
Baltimore Colts	0	8	1	.056	0–5	0–7	113	236	L2

AFC
#	Team	W	L	T	PCT	PF	PA	STK
**Seeded postseason qualifiers**
1	Los Angeles Raiders	8	1	0	.889	260	200	W5
2 (Note: Miami finished ahead of Cincinnati based on better conference record (6–1 to Cincinnati’s 6–2).)	Miami Dolphins	7	2	0	.778	198	131	W3
3	Cincinnati Bengals	7	2	0	.778	232	177	W2
4 (Note: Pittsburgh finished ahead of San Diego based on better record against common opponents (3–1 to Chargers' 2–1). Conference tiebreak was initially used to eliminate New York Jets.) (Note: Pittsburgh and San Diego finished ahead of New York Jets based on conference record (Pittsburgh and San Diego 5–3 against Jets’ 2–3))	Pittsburgh Steelers	6	3	0	.667	204	146	W2
5	San Diego Chargers	6	3	0	.667	288	221	L1
6	New York Jets	6	3	0	.667	245	166	L1
7	New England Patriots	5	4	0	.556	143	157	W1
8 (Note: Cleveland finished ahead of Buffalo and Buffalo ahead of Seattle based on conference record (4–3 to Buffalo’s 3–3 to Seattle’s 3–5).)	Cleveland Browns	4	5	0	.444	140	182	L1
**Did not qualify for the postseason**
9	Buffalo Bills	4	5	0	.444	150	154	L3
10	Seattle Seahawks	4	5	0	.444	127	147	W1
11	Kansas City Chiefs	3	6	0	.333	176	184	W1
12	Denver Broncos	2	7	0	.222	148	226	L3
13	Houston Oilers	1	8	0	.111	136	245	L7
14	Baltimore Colts	0	8	1	.056	113	236	L2
**Tiebreakers**

== See also ==
- History of the Indianapolis Colts
- List of Indianapolis Colts seasons
- Colts–Patriots rivalry
