= 1980 Baltimore Colts season =

28th season in franchise history

- Owner: Robert Irsay
- General manager: Dick Szymanski
- Head coach: Mike McCormack
- Home stadium: Memorial Stadium

Results
- Record: 7–9
- Division place: 4th AFC East
- Playoffs: Did not qualify
- Pro Bowlers: None

The 1980 Baltimore Colts season was the 28th season for the team in the National Football League (NFL). The Colts finished the NFL's 1980 season with a record of 7 wins and 9 losses, and fourth position in the AFC East division.

== Offseason ==
=== NFL draft ===
1980 Baltimore Colts draft
Round	Pick	Player	Position	College	Notes
1	5	Curtis Dickey	Running back	Texas A&M	
1	24	Derrick Hatchett	Defensive back	Texas	from Dallas
2	32	Ray Donaldson *	Center	Georgia	
2	51	Tim Foley	Tackle	Notre Dame	from Dallas
4	88	Ray Butler	Wide receiver	USC	
6	144	Chris Foote	Center	USC	
7	170	Wes Roberts	Defensive end	TCU	
8	195	Ken Walter	Tackle	Texas Tech	
9	227	Mark Bright	Running back	Temple	
10	254	Larry Stewart	Tackle	Maryland	
11	280	Eddie Whitley	Tight end	Kansas State	
12	311	Randy Bielski	Kicker	Towson State	
12	324	Marvin Sims	Running back	Clemson	
Made roster * Made at least one Pro Bowl during career

== Personnel ==
=== Staff ===
1980 Baltimore Colts staff
Front office: President and Treasurer – Robert Irsay; General manager – Dick Szymanski; Assistant General Manager – Ernie Accorsi; Head coaches: Head coach – Mike McCormack; Offensive coaches: Offensive Backfield – John Idzik; Receivers – Dick Bielski; Offensive Line – Ray Wietecha	Defensive coaches: Defensive Coordinator – Chuck Weber; Defensive Line – Ed Khayat; Defensive Backfield – John Symank; Special teams coaches: Special Teams – George Boutselis

=== Roster ===
1980 Baltimore Colts roster
Quarterbacks (QB): 7 Bert Jones; 11 Greg Landry; Running backs (RB): 27 Curtis Dickey; 31 Zachary Dixon; 38 Cleveland Franklin; 23 Don McCauley; 39 Marvin Sims; 20 Joe Washington; Wide receivers (WR): 84 Randy Burke; 80 Ray Butler; 81 Roger Carr; 87 Brian DeRoo; 45 Mike Siani; Tight ends (TE): 83 Mack Alston; 86 Reese McCall	Offensive linemen (OL): 53 Ray Donaldson C/G; 66 Chris Foote C/G; 69 Wade Griffin T; 68 Jeff Hart T; 62 Ken Huff G; 75 George Kunz T; 57 Ken Mendenhall C; 61 Robert Pratt G; Defensive linemen (DL): 63 Mike Barnes DT; 72 Fred Cook DE; 76 Joe Ehrmann DT; 79 Greg Fields DE; 94 Gary Johnson DT; 88 Herb Orvis DT; 71 Mike Ozdowski DE	Linebackers (LB): 58 Steve Heimkreiter MLB; 55 Barry Krauss OLB; 54 Sanders Shiver OLB; 56 Ed Simonini MLB; 52 Ed Smith OLB; 59 Mike Woods OLB; Defensive backs (DB): 26 Kim Anderson CB; 44 Lyle Blackwood FS; 47 Larry Braziel CB; 25 Nesby Glasgow FS/CB; 42 Derrick Hatchett CB; 40 Bruce Laird SS; 37 Reggie Pinkney SS; Special teams (ST): 4 Mike Bragg P; 5 Steve Mike-Mayer K	Reserve: 41 Mark Bailey RB (IR); 73 Ron Fernandes DE (IR); 78 Tim Foley T (IR); 29 Ben Garry RB (IR); 51 Ricky Jones LB (IR); 65 Jimmy Moore T (IR); 67 Bob Van Duyne G (IR); Rookies in italics

== Regular season ==
=== Schedule ===
Week	Date	Opponent	Result	Record	Venue	Attendance
1	September 7	at **New York Jets**	**W** 17–14	1–0	Shea Stadium	50,777
2	September 14	Pittsburgh Steelers	**L** 17–20	1–1	Memorial Stadium	54,914
3	September 21	at Houston Oilers	**L** 16–21	1–2	Astrodome	47,878
4	September 28	**New York Jets**	**W** 35–21	2–2	Memorial Stadium	33,373
5	October 5	at **Miami Dolphins**	**W** 30–17	3–2	Miami Orange Bowl	50,631
6	October 12	at **Buffalo Bills**	**W** 17–12	4–2	Rich Stadium	73,634
7	October 19	**New England Patriots**	**L** 21–37	4–3	Memorial Stadium	53,924
8	October 26	St. Louis Cardinals	**L** 10–17	4–4	Memorial Stadium	33,506
9	November 2	at Kansas City Chiefs	**W** 31–24	5–4	Arrowhead Stadium	52,383
10	November 9	Cleveland Browns	**L** 27–28	5–5	Memorial Stadium	45,369
11	November 16	at Detroit Lions	**W** 10–9	6–5	Pontiac Silverdome	77,677
12	November 23	at **New England Patriots**	**L** 21–47	6–6	Schaefer Stadium	60,994
13	November 30	**Buffalo Bills**	**W** 28–24	7–6	Memorial Stadium	36,184
14	December 7	at Cincinnati Bengals	**L** 33–34	7–7	Riverfront Stadium	35,651
15	December 14	**Miami Dolphins**	**L** 14–24	7–8	Memorial Stadium	30,564
16	December 21	Kansas City Chiefs	**L** 28–38	7–9	Memorial Stadium	16,941
Note: Intra-division opponents are in **bold** text.

=== Game summaries ===
==== Week 1 ====
Team	1	2	3	4	Total
• Colts	0	7	7	3	17
Jets	0	0	14	0	14

- Date: September 7
- Location: Shea Stadium, Flushing, New York
- Game start: 4:00 p.m. EST
- Game weather: 75 °F or 23.9 °C, wind 12 miles per hour (19 km/h; 10 kn)
- TV announcers (NBC): Charlie Jones and Len Dawson

Scoring summary
2	BAL	Bert Jones 12 yard run (Steve Mike-Mayer kick)	Colts 7–0
3	BAL	Cleveland Franklin 1 yard run (Steve Mike-Mayer kick)	Colts 14–0
3	NYJ	Richard Todd 3 yard run (Pat Leahy kick)	Colts 14–7
3	NYJ	Darrol Ray 75 yard fumble return (Pat Leahy kick)	Tie 14–14
4	BAL	Steve Mike-Mayer 46 yard field goal	Colts 17–14

==== Week 2 ====
Pittsburgh Steelers (1-0) at Baltimore Colts (1-0)

Team	1	2	3	4	Total
• Steelers	3	10	0	7	20
Colts	0	7	10	0	17

- Date: Sep 14, 1980
- Location: Memorial Stadium (Baltimore) - Baltimore, Maryland
- Game start: 2:00 p.m. EST
- Game weather: 77 °F or 25 °C; wind 7 miles per hour (11 km/h; 6.1 kn)
- Referee: Ben Dreith
- TV announcers (NBC Sports): Charlie Jones and Len Dawson

==== Week 3 ====
Despite Houston's pride and joy Earl Campbell injured and their quarterback Ken Stabler intercepting two passes, the Colts couldn't capitalize on their opportunity as they fell to the Oilers. Rob Carpenter filled in for Campbell and did remarkably well as he carried for 114 yards on 24 carries and 1 touchdown (a 1-yard plunge). Stabler though not perfect did threw 16 of 19 passes for 219 yards and 1 touchdown pass (a 3-yarder to Rich Caster) while the Oilers defense sack Bert Jones 5 times.

==== Week 6 at Bills ====
Week Six: Baltimore Colts (3–2) at Buffalo Bills (5–0)

Quarter	1	2	3	4	Total
**Colts**	10	7	0	0	**17**
Bills	0	9	0	3	**12**

at Rich Stadium, Orchard Park, New York

- Date: October 12
- Game time: 1:00 p.m. EDT
- Game weather: 49 °F (9 °C)
- Game attendance: 73,634
- Referee: Jim Tunney
- TV: NBC
- Box Score

Game information

**First quarter**

- BAL – Mike Siani 38-yard pass from Bert Jones (Steve Mike-Mayer kick). Colts 7–0.
- BAL – Steve Mike-Mayer 21-yard field goal. Colts 10–0.

**Second quarter**

- BUF – Roosevelt Leaks 1-yard run. Colts 10–6.
- BAL – Don McCauley 1-yard run (Steve Mike-Mayer kick). Colts 17–6.
- BUF – Nick Mike-Mayer 49-yard field goal. Colts 17–9.

**Third quarter**

- No scoring

**Fourth quarter**

- BUF – Nick Mike-Mayer 20-yard field goal. Colts 17–12.

Top passers

- BAL – Bert Jones – 10/21, 206 yards, TD, INT
- BUF – Joe Ferguson – 17/36, 210 yards, INT

Top rushers

- BAL – Joe Washington – 22 rushes, 74 yards
- BUF – Joe Cribbs – 18 rushes, 76 yards

Top receivers

- BAL – Mike Siani – 4 receptions, 91 yards, TD
- BUF – Frank Lewis – 3 receptions, 52 yards

=== Standings ===
AFC East
	W	L	T	PCT	DIV	CONF	PF	PA	STK
^{(3)} Buffalo Bills	11	5	0	.688	4–4	8–4	320	260	W1
New England Patriots	10	6	0	.625	6–2	9–3	441	325	W2
Miami Dolphins	8	8	0	.500	3–5	4–8	266	305	L1
Baltimore Colts	7	9	0	.438	5–3	6–8	355	387	L3
New York Jets	4	12	0	.250	2–6	3–9	302	395	W1

== See also ==
- History of the Indianapolis Colts
- Indianapolis Colts seasons
- Colts–Patriots rivalry
