= List of Indianapolis Colts first-round draft picks =

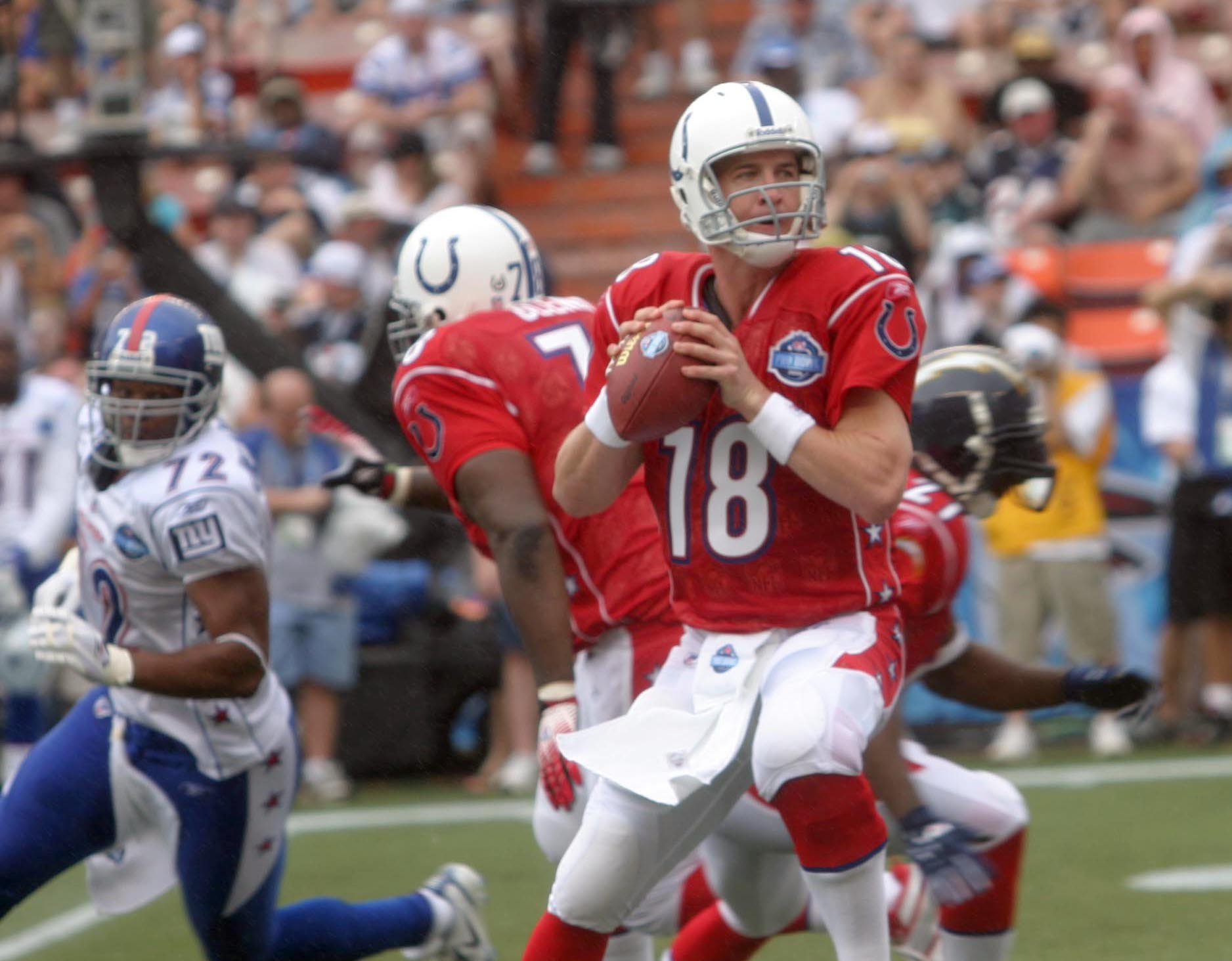
Peyton Manning, first overall pick of the 1998 draft

The Baltimore Colts joined the National Football League (NFL) in 1953 where they participated in their first NFL draft and selected Billy Vessels, a halfback from the University of Oklahoma. The team's most recent first-round selection was Tyler Warren, a tight end from Penn State in the 2025 NFL draft.

Every year during April, each NFL franchise seeks to add new players to its roster through a collegiate draft officially known as the NFL Annual Player Selection Meeting but more commonly known as the NFL Draft. Teams are ranked in inverse order based on the previous season's record, with the worst record picking first, and the second worst picking second and so on. The two exceptions to this order are made for teams that appeared in the previous Super Bowl; the Super Bowl champion always picks last, and the Super Bowl loser always picks second last. Teams have the option of trading away their picks to other teams for different picks, players, cash, or a combination thereof. Thus, it is not uncommon for a team's actual draft pick to differ from their assigned draft pick, or for a team to have extra or no draft picks in any round due to these trades.

The Colts have selected the number one overall pick in the draft on seven occasions, one of which was used to select Super Bowl XLI MVP Peyton Manning. They have also selected the second overall pick five times and the third overall pick twice. The team's five selections from Ohio State University are the most chosen by the Colts from one university.

== Key ==
Table key
^	Indicates the player was inducted into the Pro Football Hall of Fame.
*	Selected number one overall
†	Indicates the player was selected for the Pro Bowl at any time in their career.
—	The Colts did not draft a player in the first round that year.
Year	Each year links to an article about that particular NFL Draft.
Pick	Indicates the number of the pick within the first round
Position	Indicates the position of the player in the NFL
College	The player's college football team

== Player selections ==
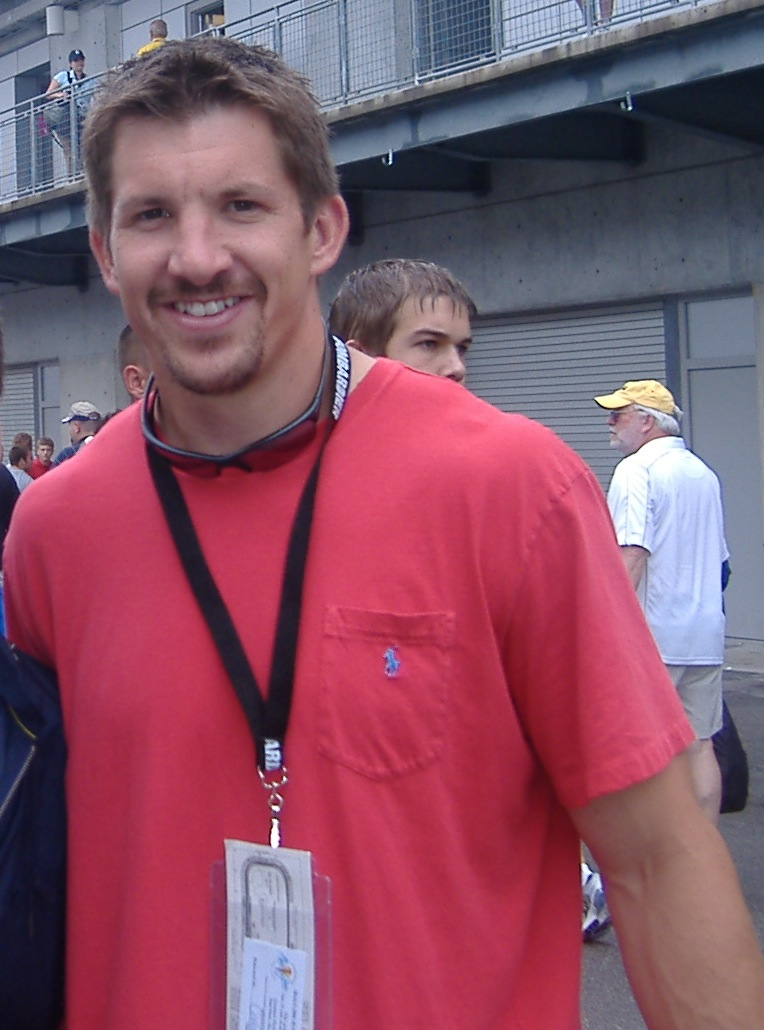
2003 Colts 1st-round pick Dallas Clark

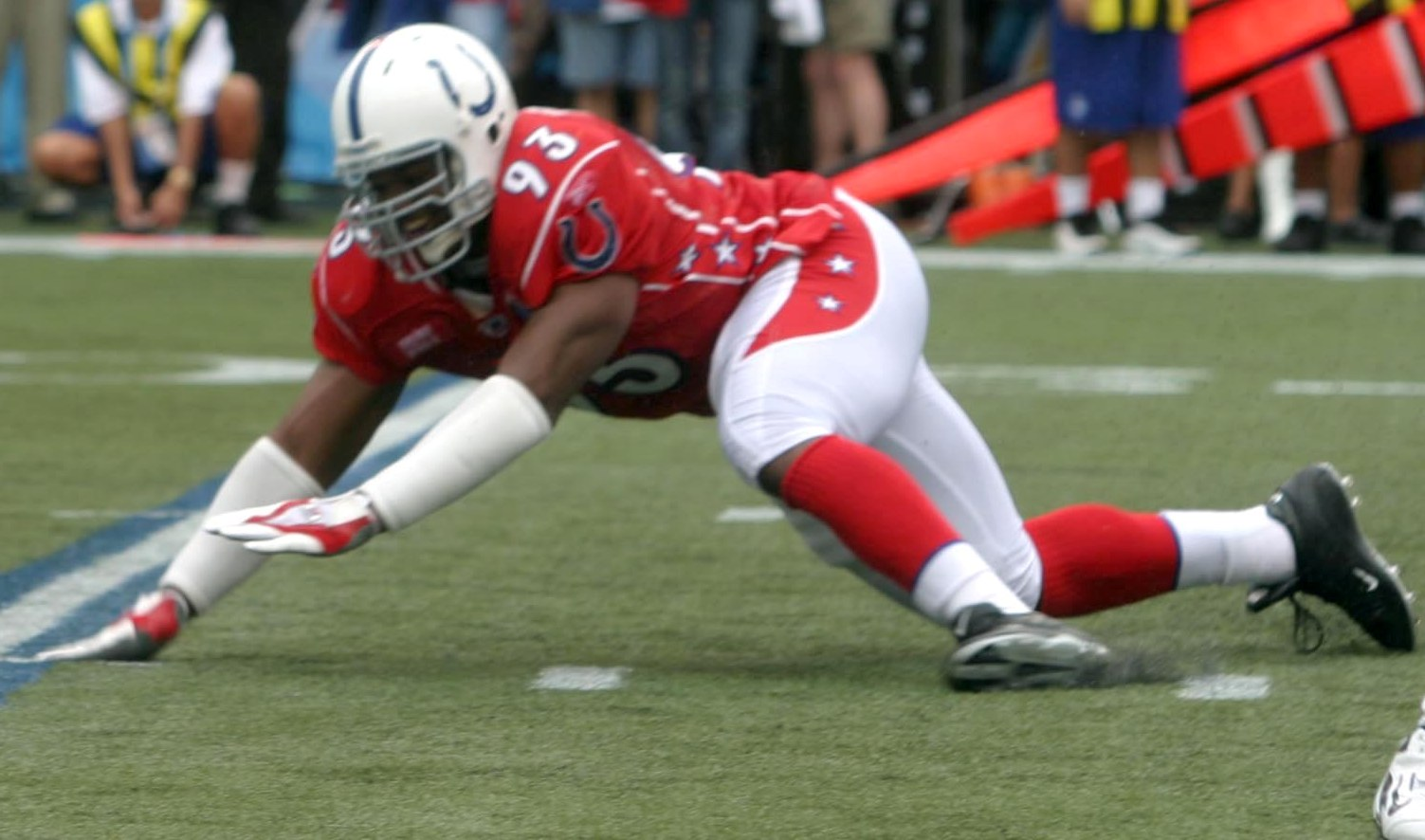
2002 Colts 1st-round pick Dwight Freeney in the Pro Bowl

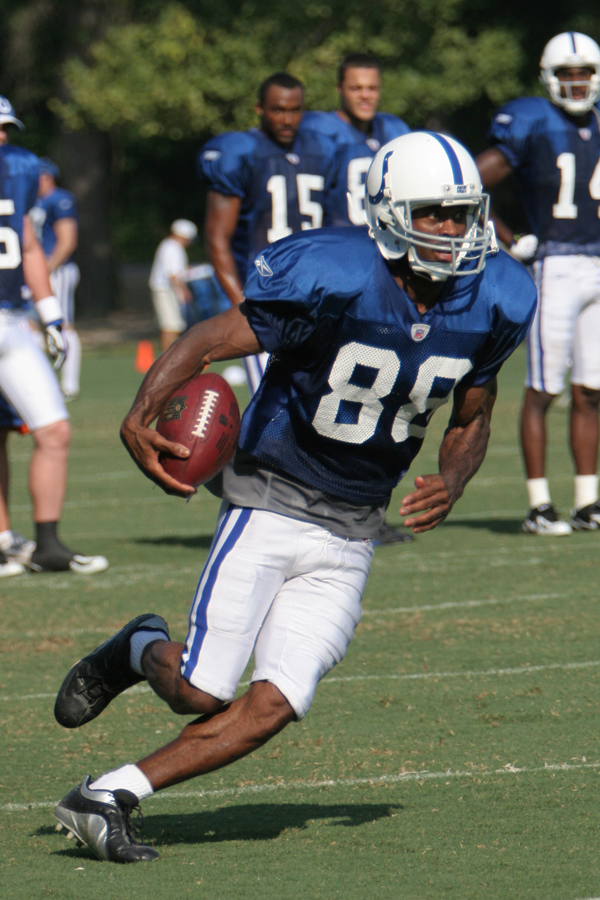
1996 Colts 1st-round pick Marvin Harrison

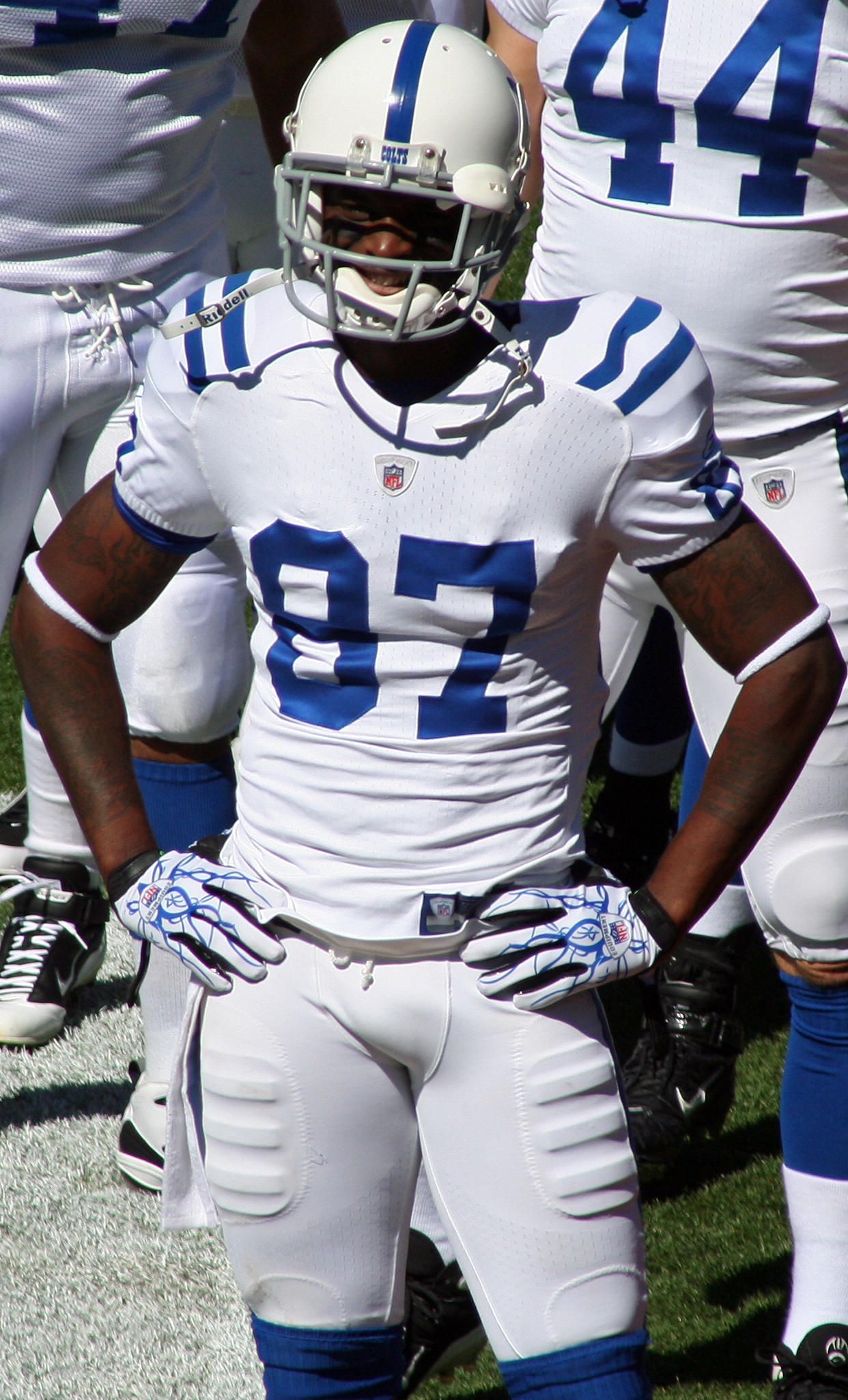
2001 Colts 1st-round pick Reggie Wayne

Indianapolis Colts first-round draft picks
Year	Pick	Player name	Position	College	Notes
1953	2	Billy Vessels	HB	Oklahoma	
1954	5	Cotton Davidson	QB	Baylor	
1955	1 *	George Shaw	QB	Oregon	
1955	3	Alan Ameche †	FB	Wisconsin	
1956	9	Lenny Moore ^	HB	Penn State	
1957	8	Jim Parker ^	G	Ohio State	
1958	11	Lenny Lyles †	CB	Louisville	
1959	12	Jackie Burkett	C	Auburn	
1960	10	Ron Mix ^	OT	USC	
1961	7	Tom Matte †	RB	Ohio State	
1962	9	Wendell Harris	CB	Louisiana State	
1963	5	Bob Vogel †	OT	Ohio State	
1964	8	Marv Woodson †	S	Indiana	
1965	14	Mike Curtis †	LB	Duke	
1966	15	Sam Ball	OT	Kentucky	
1967	1 *	Bubba Smith †	DE	Michigan State	
1967	20	Jim Detwiler	HB	Michigan	
1968	23	John Williams	OT	Minnesota	
1969	25	Eddie Hinton	WR	Oklahoma	
1970	18	Norm Bulaich †	RB	Texas Christian	
1971	22	Don McCauley	RB	North Carolina	
1971	26	Leonard Dunlap	CB	North Texas	
1972	22	Tom Drougas	OT	Oregon	
1973	2	Bert Jones †	QB	Louisiana State	
1973	10	Joe Ehrmann †	DT	Syracuse	
1974	5	John Dutton †	DT	Nebraska	
1974	24	Roger Carr †	WR	Louisiana Tech	
1975	3	Ken Huff	G	North Carolina	
1976	20	Ken Novak	DT	Purdue	
1977	26	Randy Burke	WR	Kentucky	
1978	25	Reese McCall	TE	Auburn	
1979	6	Barry Krauss	LB	Alabama	
1980	5	Curtis Dickey	RB	Texas A&M	
1980	24	Derrick Hatchett	CB	Texas	
1981	12	Randy McMillan	RB	Pittsburgh	
1981	18	Donnell Thompson	DE	North Carolina	
1982	2	Johnie Cooks	LB	Mississippi State	
1982	4	Art Schlichter	QB	Ohio State	
1983	1 *	John Elway ^	QB	Stanford	
1984	8	Leonard Coleman	CB	Vanderbilt	
1984	19	Ron Solt †	G	Maryland	
1985	5	Duane Bickett †	LB	USC	
1986	4	Jon Hand	DE	Alabama	
1987	2	Cornelius Bennett †	LB	Alabama	
1988	—	No Pick	—	—	
1989	22	Andre Rison †	WR	Michigan State	
1990	1 *	Jeff George	QB	Illinois	
1991	—	No Pick	—	—	
1992	1 *	Steve Emtman	DE	Washington	
1992	2	Quentin Coryatt	LB	Texas A&M	
1993	16	Sean Dawkins	WR	California	
1994	2	Marshall Faulk ^	RB	San Diego State	
1994	5	Trev Alberts	LB	Nebraska	
1995	15	Ellis Johnson	DT	Florida	
1996	19	Marvin Harrison ^	WR	Syracuse	
1997	19	Tarik Glenn †	OT	California	
1998	1 *	Peyton Manning ^	QB	Tennessee	
1999	4	Edgerrin James ^	RB	Miami (FL)	
2000	28	Rob Morris	LB	BYU	
2001	30	Reggie Wayne †	WR	Miami (FL)	
2002	11	Dwight Freeney ^	DE	Syracuse	
2003	24	Dallas Clark †	TE	Iowa	
2004	No pick (traded to Atlanta Falcons, used to select Michael Jenkins)				
2005	29	Marlin Jackson	CB	Michigan	
2006	30	Joseph Addai †	RB	LSU	
2007	32	Anthony Gonzalez	WR	Ohio State	
2008	No pick (traded to San Francisco 49ers, used to select Kentwan Balmer)				
2009	27	Donald Brown	RB	Connecticut	
2010	31	Jerry Hughes	DE	TCU	
2011	22	Anthony Castonzo	OT	Boston College	
2012	1 *	Andrew Luck †	QB	Stanford	
2013	24	Björn Werner	DE	Florida State	
2014	No pick (traded to Cleveland Browns, who then traded it to Philadelphia Eagles, used to select Marcus Smith)				
2015	29	Phillip Dorsett	WR	Miami (FL)	
2016	18	Ryan Kelly †	C	Alabama	
2017	15	Malik Hooker	S	Ohio State	
2018	6	Quenton Nelson †	G	Notre Dame	
2019	No pick (traded to Washington Redskins, used to select Montez Sweat)				
2020	No pick (traded to San Francisco 49ers, who then traded it to Tampa Bay Buccaneers, used to select Tristan Wirfs)				
2021	21	Kwity Paye	DE	Michigan	
2022	No pick (traded to Philadelphia Eagles, who then traded it to New Orleans Saints, who then traded it to Washington Commanders, used to select Jahan Dotson)				
2023	4	Anthony Richardson	QB	Florida	
2024	15	Laiatu Latu	DE	UCLA	
2025	14	Tyler Warren	TE	Penn State	
2026	—	No Pick	—	—	
