= Raheem Brock =

American football player (born 1978)

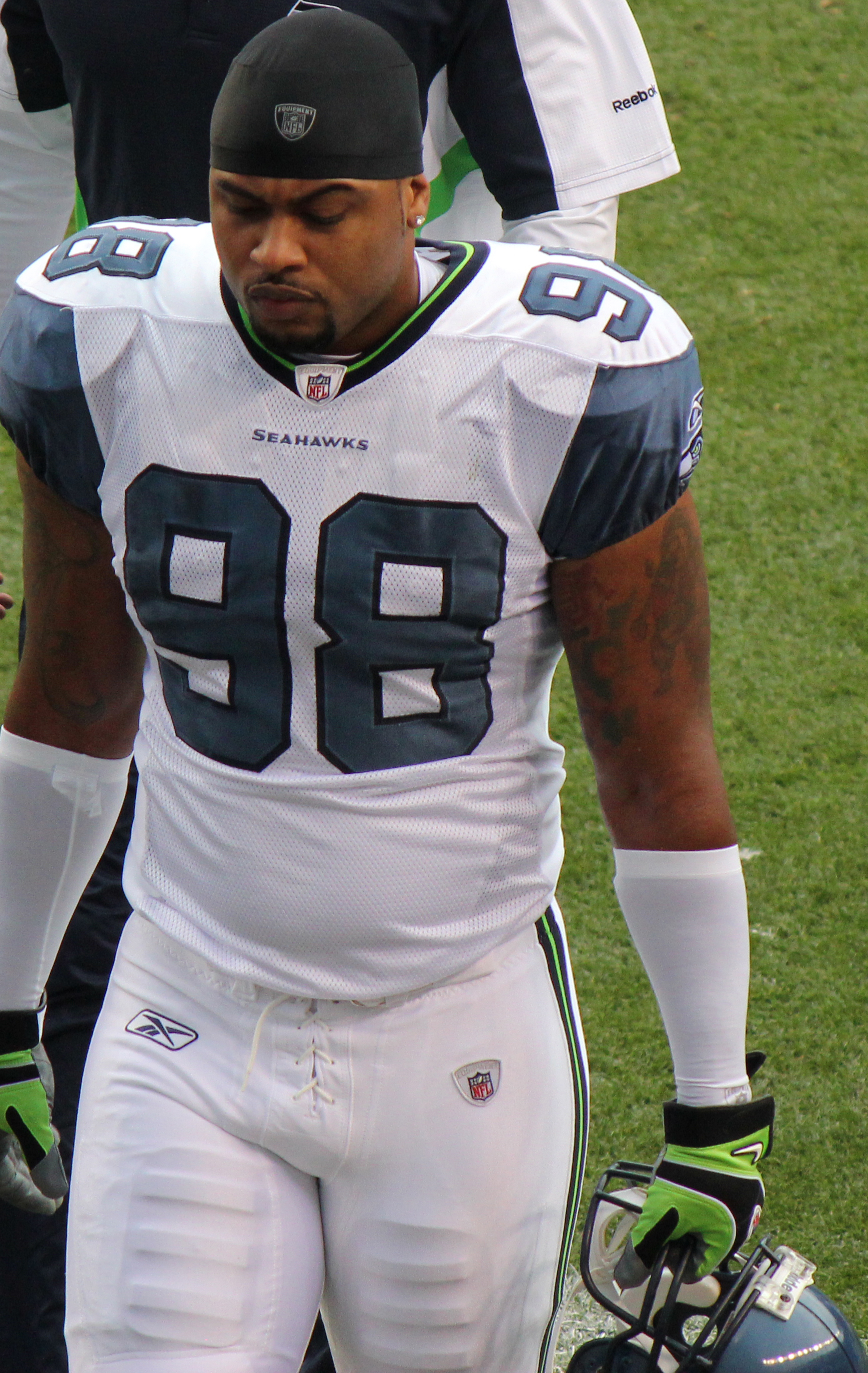
- Brock with the Seattle Seahawks in 2011

No. 79, 98
- Position: Defensive end

Personal information
- Born: June 10, 1978 (age 48); Philadelphia, Pennsylvania, U.S.
- Listed height: 6 ft 4 in (1.93 m)
- Listed weight: 274 lb (124 kg)

Career information
- High school: Dobbins (Philadelphia)
- College: Temple
- NFL draft: 2002: 7th round, 238th overall pick

Career history
- Indianapolis Colts (2002–2009); Tennessee Titans (2010)*; Seattle Seahawks (2010–2011)
- * Offseason or practice squad member only

Awards and highlights
- Super Bowl champion (XLI)

Career NFL statistics
- Total tackles: 364
- Sacks: 40.5
- Forced fumbles: 14
- Fumble recoveries: 16
- Stats at Pro Football Reference

Raheem Fukwan Brock (born June 10, 1978) is an American former professional football player who was a defensive end the National Football League (NFL). He played college football for the Temple Owls. He was selected by the Philadelphia Eagles in the seventh round of the 2002 NFL draft, but was never signed by them. Brock subsequently played for the Indianapolis Colts for eight years, winning Super Bowl XLI with them, and he also played with the Seattle Seahawks.

== Early life ==
Brock grew up in the Germantown area of Philadelphia. He is the son of Zachary Dixon, a former NFL running back and return man from 1979 to 1985. He spent most of his childhood with his mother, Patricia, but lived with his father in Maryland in fifth grade and spent much of his summers with him.

He attended Murrell Dobbins Tech in Philadelphia, Pennsylvania and was a letterman in football until his graduation in 1996. He played tight end, linebacker, and punter. As a freshman, he helped the team win the Philadelphia Public League championship. As a 6-foot-3, 240-pound senior, he was all-Philadelphia first-team selection by The Philadelphia Inquirer after racking up 88 tackles, five sacks and six interceptions as a linebacker.

== College career ==
Brock was a four-year letterman at defensive end for Temple University and started 39 career games. He finished his career with 184 tackles, 20 sacks, and 38 stops for losses. He graduated in May 2001 with an undergraduate's degree in marketing.

== Professional career ==
=== NFL draft ===
Despite his impressive pedigree and stats, Brock was downgraded by draft experts due to his less-than-desired height for a defensive end and lack of quickness and jumping ability to make up for it.

Brock was selected in the seventh round of the 2002 NFL draft by the Philadelphia Eagles, but his draft rights were renounced by the team on July 25, 2002, before the 2002 season began, due to an inability to fit him into their rookie salary cap. Brock's agent commented that there was significant interest from other teams about signing him and that "The Eagles will look bad if one of two things happen: if Raheem turns out to be a player at a position that's hard to find good players, or if one of the Eagles' defensive linemen gets injured."

=== Indianapolis Colts ===
Brock was claimed off waivers by the Indianapolis Colts on July 28, 2002. During his 8 seasons with the Colts, he started 104 regular-season games (76 at defensive end and 28 at tackle), frequently alternating with Dwight Freeney and Robert Mathis. He had 28.5 sacks and 408 tackles, while forcing 12 fumbles and recovering 15 fumbles. He helped the Colts win Super Bowl XLI and played his last game for them in Super Bowl XLIV. He was released on March 7, 2010. In 2013, he was named to The Indianapolis Star's "All-time Indianapolis Colts team."

=== Tennessee Titans ===
Brock signed with the Tennessee Titans on August 12, 2010. He was released on September 5.

=== Seattle Seahawks ===
Brock signed with the Seattle Seahawks on September 8, 2010.

During Brock's 2010 season with the Seahawks, he posted 9.0 regular season sacks, a career high, and recorded 2.5 sacks during the post season. His 11.5 sacks during 2010 are both career Highs and season highs for Brock.

He returned for one season in Seattle after failing to get a longer contract anywhere else. Seattle then drafted Bruce Irvin in the 1st round of the 2012 draft to replace Brock, leaving him as an unsigned free agent.

== NFL career statistics ==
Legend
**Bold**	Career high

=== Regular season ===
Year	Team	Games		Tackles					Interceptions					Fumbles			
Year	Team	GP	GS	Cmb	Solo	Ast	Sck	TFL	Int	Yds	TD	Lng	PD	FF	FR	Yds	TD
2002	IND	13	6	22	15	7	1.0	0	0	0	0	0	1	1	1	0	0
2003	IND	**16**	**16**	42	25	**17**	2.0	5	0	0	0	0	3	0	**3**	8	0
2004	IND	**16**	**16**	47	36	11	6.5	**13**	0	0	0	0	**4**	1	2	0	0
2005	IND	**16**	**16**	**51**	**42**	9	6.5	11	0	0	0	0	2	**4**	1	**15**	0
2006	IND	**16**	**16**	48	34	14	3.0	2	0	0	0	0	2	3	**3**	0	0
2007	IND	11	11	31	24	7	2.5	7	0	0	0	0	3	0	2	0	0
2008	IND	**16**	15	30	26	4	3.5	4	0	0	0	0	1	3	1	9	0
2009	IND	**16**	8	32	25	7	3.5	3	0	0	0	0	1	0	2	9	0
2010	SEA	**16**	0	32	26	6	**9.0**	7	0	0	0	0	3	1	1	0	0
2011	SEA	**16**	0	29	16	13	3.0	3	0	0	0	0	0	1	0	0	0
		152	104	364	269	95	40.5	55	0	0	0	0	20	14	16	41	0

=== Playoffs ===
Year	Team	Games		Tackles					Interceptions					Fumbles			
Year	Team	GP	GS	Cmb	Solo	Ast	Sck	TFL	Int	Yds	TD	Lng	PD	FF	FR	Yds	TD
2002	IND	1	0	3	3	0	0.0	0	0	0	0	0	0	0	0	0	0
2003	IND	3	3	6	4	2	0.0	1	0	0	0	0	0	0	0	0	0
2004	IND	2	2	**12**	**9**	3	1.0	**5**	0	0	0	0	**2**	0	0	0	0
2005	IND	1	1	7	5	2	0.0	1	0	0	0	0	0	0	0	0	0
2006	IND	**4**	**4**	**12**	8	4	1.0	3	0	0	0	0	0	0	**1**	0	0
2007	IND	1	1	1	1	0	0.0	0	0	0	0	0	0	0	0	0	0
2008	IND	1	1	2	2	0	0.0	1	0	0	0	0	0	0	**1**	0	0
2009	IND	3	0	**12**	6	**6**	0.0	0	0	0	0	0	**2**	**2**	0	0	0
2010	SEA	2	0	6	5	1	**2.0**	2	0	0	0	0	0	**2**	0	0	0
		18	12	61	43	18	4.0	13	0	0	0	0	4	4	2	0	0

== Personal life ==
Brock married Deziree Williams, whom he had met at Temple and dated throughout college, in June 2002. They had one daughter together, born in July 2003, before they divorced in October 2005.

On the morning of November 13, 2010, Brock was pulled over after being observed driving 85-90 mph in a 60 mph zone. A preliminary breath test indicated a blood alcohol concentration of .133; the legal limit in Washington is .08. Later breath tests at the University of Washington Police Department measured Brock's BAC at .115 and .111. On December 6, 2011, more than a year after his DUI arrest, Brock was charged with driving under the influence. The King County prosecutor's office reportedly lost the file and only found it after a journalist from Philadelphia inquired about the status of the case.

On June 16, 2011, Brock was arrested for walking out on a $27 bar tab. On November 23, 2011, Brock was convicted of theft in the incident, but the conviction was overturned upon appeal on April 27, 2012.

Brock founded The Raheem Brock Student-Athlete Scholarship in 2007, which was created with the intent of providing financial assistance to male and female students attending Dobbins C.T.E. High School pursuing a post-secondary education.
