= Randy McMillan =

American football player (1958–2026)

No. 32
- Position: Fullback

Personal information
- Born: December 17, 1958; Havre De Grace, Maryland, U.S.
- Died: January 7, 2026 (aged 67); Baltimore, Maryland, U.S.
- Listed height: 6 ft 0 in (1.83 m)
- Listed weight: 219 lb (99 kg)

Career information
- High school: The John Carroll School (Bel Air, Maryland); North Harford (Pylesville, Maryland)
- College: Harford CC (1977–78); Pittsburgh (1979–80)
- NFL draft: 1981: 1st round, 12th overall pick

Career history
- Baltimore/Indianapolis Colts (1981–1986); Miami Dolphins (1988)*
- * Offseason or practice squad member only

Awards and highlights
- First-team All-East (1980)

Career NFL statistics
- Rushing yards: 3,876
- Rushing average: 3.9
- Rushing touchdowns: 24
- Receptions: 164
- Receiving yards: 1,356
- Receiving touchdowns: 2
- Stats at Pro Football Reference

Lewis Lorando "Randy" McMillan (December 17, 1958 – January 7, 2026) was an American professional football player who was a fullback in the National Football League (NFL). McMillan played for the Baltimore/Indianapolis Colts from 1981 to 1986. He was selected by the Baltimore Colts in the first round of the 1981 NFL draft with the 12th overall pick. McMillan played collegiately for Harford Community College, earning All-American junior college honors, before transferring to the University of Pittsburgh.

== Early life ==
Randy McMillan was born on December 17, 1958, in Havre De Grace, Maryland, and was raised in Jarrettsville, Maryland. McMillan first attended The John Carroll School in Bel Air, Maryland, where he played football during his freshman and sophomore years. Before his junior year, he transferred to North Harford High School, where he played football, basketball, and ran track and field. As a senior, McMillan led North Harford in rushing and earned a selection to the 1976 All-American Team.

== College career ==
=== Harford Community College (1977–1978) ===
McMillan began his college football career at Harford Community College in Bel Air, Maryland. As a freshman, McMillan led the Harford Owls to their first undefeated season in team history. He suffered a broken ankle in the final game of the season. McMillan led the team in rushing with 1,002 yards and earned Maryland Junior College All-Region and All-State honors.

As a sophomore at Harford, McMillan again led the Owls to an undefeated season. His impressive stats of 187 carries for 1,546 yards (8.2 yard average) and 20 touchdowns earned him All-Region, All-State, and National Junior College All-American honors. Following his sophomore year at Harford, McMillan received a scholarship to continue his college football career at the University of Pittsburgh.

=== University of Pittsburgh (1978–1979) ===
In his Pitt debut, McMillan recorded 12 carries for 141 yards to defeat Kansas 24–0. He and freshman quarterback Dan Marino led the Panthers to an 11–1 record and finished the season ranked number seven in the AP poll. The Panthers defeated Arizona 16–10 in the 1979 Fiesta Bowl. McMillan finished his junior year with 721 rushing yards and 10 total touchdowns.

Pitt had high expectations coming into McMillan's senior season, with the Panthers ranked #3 in the AP preseason poll. Pitt and McMillan had a poor opening game to the season. McMillan fumbled twice and Marino threw five interceptions in close-call win against Boston College. The Panthers recovered from their slow start to go 11–1 for the second consecutive season. The team's final regular season game was a matchup against #5 ranked Penn State, which they won 14–9. Pitt earned a spot in the 1980 Gator Bowl against #18 ranked South Carolina, winning 37–9. In the Gator Bowl victory, McMillan had one touchdown run and one touchdown reception from quarterback Rick Trocano. McMillan again led Pitt in rushing with 633 yards and nine touchdowns. He earned an Honorable Mention in the 1980 All-America voting.

In the lead up to the 1981 NFL draft, McMillan was projected as the first fullback to be selected.

== Professional career ==
McMillan was drafted by the Baltimore Colts in the first round of the 1981 NFL draft with the 12th overall selection. McMillan grew up near Baltimore, and was considered a hometown selection by fans.

=== Baltimore/Indianapolis Colts (1981–1986) ===
==== 1981 season ====
McMillan joined a Colts backfield occupied by 1980 first round draft pick Curtis Dickey. Baltimore hoped to combine Dickey's speed with McMillan's toughness. McMillan made an instant impact, rushing for 146 yards and two touchdowns in his NFL debut, a 29–28 Colts victory over the New England Patriots, on September 6, 1981. Those 146 rushing yards were the second-most for a Colts player in his NFL debut. Overall, the Colts went 2–14, but despite the team's poor performance McMillan started all 16 games and amassed 149 rushes for 597 yards and three touchdowns, plus 50 receptions for 466 yards and one touchdown.

==== 1982 season ====
In the strike-shortened 1982 NFL season, Dickey suffered lingering injuries that provided McMillan more opportunities. McMillan again started all nine games of the truncated season, with 101 carries for 305 yards and one touchdown. McMillan's lone touchdown came in the Colts week 15 tie against the Green Bay Packers. McMillan plunged for a one-yard touchdown run to tie the game late in the fourth quarter, giving the Colts their only non-loss of the season. The Colts went 0–8–1 and became only the third team since the AFL-NFL merger to finish the season winless.

==== 1983 season ====
In 1983, McMillan started all 16 games and recorded 198 carries for 802 yards and five touchdowns, with 24 receptions for 195 yards and one touchdown. His best game of the season came in week nine against the Philadelphia Eagles. McMillan had 19 carries for 109 yards and one touchdown. McMillan and Dickey combined for 1,924 rushing yards, most in the AFC and second-most in the NFL. The Colts finished the season at 7–9.

In March 1984, Colts owner Robert Irsay relocated the team from Baltimore to Indianapolis. McMillan remained with the Colts in their new city.

==== 1984 season ====
In the Colts first season in Indianapolis, McMillan started in all 16 contests - adding to his streak of 57 consecutive starts. McMillan led the team in rushing with 163 rushing attempts for 705 yards and five touchdowns. In the Colts' week 5 victory over the Buffalo Bills, McMillan had 16 carries for 114 yards and two touchdowns. The Dickey-McMillan tandem continued to produce on the field, but the Colts faltered and ended the season at 4–12.

==== 1985 season ====
The 1985 season was another disappointing output for the Colts. Under first-year coach Rod Dowhower, the team finished 5–11 and missed the playoffs for the eighth consecutive season. McMillan posted his best statistical season, leading the team in rushing for the third time, with 190 carries for 858 yards and seven touchdowns. He split rushing duties with running back George Wonsley, as Curtis Dickey was sidelined with injuries before being released mid-season.

==== 1986 season ====
McMillan's final season in Indianapolis saw the team start at 0–13 before winning their final three games under interim coach Ron Meyer. McMillan had a poor start to the season, and did not score until week eight against the Miami Dolphins. His best game of the season came in the Colts' week 10 loss to the New England Patriots. McMillan had 20 carries for 76 yards and one touchdown. McMillan led the team in rushing for the second straight year, with 189 attempts for 609 yards and three touchdowns.

=== Leg injury ===
On April 26, 1987, McMillan was struck by a car while trying to cross the road near his home in Timonium, Maryland. He fractured his leg and received lacerations on his face. His injuries required surgery, with a rod being placed in his leg.

McMillan missed the entire 1987 NFL season due to his injuries. Throughout the season, McMillan and his agent feuded with Colts owner Robert Irsay over payments and access to the Colts training complex for rehabilitation. While McMillan was away, the Colts traded with the Los Angeles Rams for star running back Eric Dickerson. The combination of Dickerson's arrival and McMillan's injury led to him being cut by the team in August 1988.

McMillan left the Colts as their then-fifth all-time leading rusher, with 3,876 rushing yards.

=== Miami Dolphins (1988) ===
After being released by the Colts, McMillan was signed by the Miami Dolphins on August 11, 1988. He spent two weeks with the Dolphins before he was released on August 25, 1988.

== Later life and death ==
Following the end to his professional football career, McMillan managed a health club in White Marsh, Maryland.

In 2002, McMillan fell asleep at the wheel of his car, crashing into a guardrail. He suffered a spinal injury.

McMillan was elected to the Maryland State Athletic Hall of Fame, as well as North Harford High School, Harford Community College, and the Harford County Hall of Fame. He was also chosen as one of the Top 50 Athletes in the 250-year History of Harford County, MD.

McMillan died on January 7, 2026, at the age of 67.

== Professional statistics ==
Year	Team	Games		Rushing					Receiving				
Year	Team	GP	GS	Att	Yds	Avg	Lng	TD	Rec	Yds	Avg	Lng	TD
1981	BAL	16	16	149	597	4.0	42	3	50	466	9.3	31	1
1982	BAL	9	9	101	305	3.0	13	1	15	90	6.0	17	0
1983	BAL	16	16	198	802	4.1	39	5	24	195	8.1	27	1
1984	IND	16	16	163	705	4.3	31	5	19	201	10.6	44	0
1985	IND	15	14	190	858	4.5	38	7	22	115	5.2	17	0
1986	IND	16	16	189	609	3.2	28	3	34	289	8.5	45	0
Career		88	87	990	3,876	3.9	42	24	164	1,356	8.3	45	2
