= Jim Burroughs =

American football player (born 1958)

No. 45
- Position: Cornerback

Personal information
- Born: January 21, 1958 (age 68); Pahokee, Florida, U.S.
- Listed height: 6 ft 1 in (1.85 m)
- Listed weight: 190 lb (86 kg)

Career information
- High school: Pahokee
- College: Michigan State
- NFL draft: 1982: 3rd round, 57th overall pick

Career history
- Baltimore/Indianapolis Colts (1982–1984)

Awards and highlights
- First-team All-Big Ten (1981)

Career NFL statistics
- Interceptions: 6
- Fumble recoveries: 2
- Touchdowns: 1
- Stats at Pro Football Reference

James Edward Burroughs (born January 21, 1958) is an American former professional football player who was a cornerback on the National Football League (NFL) for three seasons with the Baltimore/Indianapolis Colts. Burroughs played college football at Michigan State University.
