= Curtis Dickey =

American football player (born 1956)

No. 27, 33
- Position: Running back

Personal information
- Born: November 27, 1956 (age 69); Madisonville, Texas, U.S.
- Listed height: 6 ft 1 in (1.85 m)
- Listed weight: 213 lb (97 kg)

Career information
- High school: Bryan (Bryan, Texas)
- College: Texas A&M (1976–1979)
- NFL draft: 1980: 1st round, 5th overall pick

Career history
- Baltimore/Indianapolis Colts (1980–1985); Cleveland Browns (1985–1986)

Awards and highlights
- First-team All-SWC (1978); Second-team All-SWC (1976); Texas A&M Athletic Hall of Fame (1988); Southwest Conference Hall of Fame (2018)

Career NFL statistics
- Rushing yards: 4,019
- Rushing average: 4.3
- Rushing touchdowns: 32
- Receptions: 134
- Receiving yards: 1,577
- Receiving touchdowns: 8
- Stats at Pro Football Reference

Curtis Raymond Dickey (born November 27, 1956) is an American former professional football player who was a running back in the National Football League (NFL) for seven seasons, spending most of his career with the Baltimore/Indianapolis Colts before finishing his career with the Cleveland Browns. He played college football for the Texas A&M Aggies.

== Early life ==
Curtis Dickey was born on November 27, 1956, in Madisonville, Texas. Dickey was one of six children, and grew up in Bryan, Texas. Dickey attended Bryan High School where he was a multi-sport star in football, basketball, and track. Dickey was a Texas All-State selection in football in both his junior and senior years. After his 1976 senior season, Dickey was considered the number one high school football prospect in the country. Although he was courted by other programs, Dickey chose to stay in his hometown to play football at Texas A&M University.

== College career ==
Dickey was a two-sport athlete at Texas A&M, earning varsity letters in all four years as a running back in football and a sprinter on the track team.

=== Football ===
Dickey excelled on the football field, finishing his Texas A&M career with the then-record for all-time rushing yards (currently, the second most all-time rushing yards). His college career stats included 697 rushes for 3,703 yards for a 5.3 yard average and 31 touchdowns.

In his freshman season (1976), Dickey and George Woodard led a dual backfield that propelled the Aggies to a 10–2 record and a #7 rank in the final AP poll. Texas A&M appeared in the 1976 Sun Bowl, defeating Florida 37–14. The following season, the dual-threat attack of Woodard and Dickey continued to produce, but the Aggies finished the season 8–4 and lost to USC in the Bluebonnet Bowl. Dickey's junior season was his best statistical season at Texas A&M. He led the team in rushing with 1,146 yards and nine touchdowns. The Aggies earned a bid to the Hall of Fame Classic, where Dickey set a bowl game record with 276 rushing yards. Texas A&M defeated Iowa State 28–12. Dickey was plagued by injuries during his senior season, but still led the team with 853 rushing yards and nine touchdowns. The Aggies went 6–5 and did not make a bowl appearance.

In 1988, Dickey was elected to the Texas A&M Athletic Hall of Fame

==== College football statistics ====
Year	Team	Games	Rushing				Receiving			
Year	Team	GP	Att	Yds	Avg	TD	Rec	Yds	Avg	TD
1976	Texas A&M	11	142	726	5.1	8	13	146	11.2	0
1977	Texas A&M	11	178	978	5.5	5	17	231	13.6	1
1978	Texas A&M	11	205	1,146	5.6	9	6	69	11.5	0
1979	Texas A&M	11	172	853	5.0	9	6	50	8.3	0
Career		44	697	3,703	5.3	31	42	496	11.8	1

=== Track and field ===
As a world-class sprinter, Dickey won the NCAA indoor championship in the 60-yard dash three times (1978–1980). His 10.11 in the 100 meters was the sixth fastest time in the world in 1978. He also posted a personal best of 6.10 seconds in the 55 meters. At the 1980 Southwest Texas Indoor Track and Field Championship, Dickey finished second behind Herkie Walls in the 60-yard dash (55 meters).

In February 1980, Dickey won the U.S. National Indoor Track and Field Championship in the 60-yard dash, posting a time of 6.09 seconds.

Prior to the 1980 NFL draft, there was speculation that Dickey may forego the draft to train for the 1980 Summer Olympics. However, the United States boycotted the games and Dickey entered the draft.

== Professional career ==
=== Baltimore/Indianapolis Colts (1980–1985) ===
==== 1980 season ====
Dickey was selected by the Baltimore Colts in the first round, fifth overall, of the 1980 NFL draft. In his rookie season, Dickey played in 15 games after missing the season opener. Dickey led the Colts in rushing with 800 yards and scored a total of 13 touchdowns (11 rushing, two receiving), tied for most in the AFC. From week nine against the Kansas City Chiefs to week 15 against the Miami Dolphins, Dickey had seven consecutive games where he scored a touchdown. His first career start came in week 12 against the New England Patriots where he also earned his first career 100-yard rushing game. He finished that game with 16 carries for 102 yards and two touchdowns.

Dickey set several Colts rookie records. His 13 total touchdowns was the most ever scored by a rookie, while his 11 rushing touchdowns were a rookie record and tied him with Tom Matte and Lydell Mitchell as franchise records. He also became only the third ever rookie to lead the Colts in rushing, with Alan Ameche and Norm Bulaich having done it before him.

Although Dickey had a record-setting rookie season, the Colts finished 7–9 and missed the playoffs.

==== 1981 season ====
In 1981, the Colts fared worse with a 2–14 record. Their only wins came in the first and last weeks of the regular season, both against the New England Patriots.

Dickey continued to perform well despite the team's poor record. He started 15 games, only missing one game due to injury. Dickey again led the Colts in rushing with 779 yards and was the team's leading scorer with 60 points from 10 total touchdowns (seven rushing, three receiving). The Colts used a two-pronged rushing attack of Dickey and rookie fullback Randy McMillan, who combined for 1,376 rushing yards and 14 total touchdowns.

Dickey's combined 23 touchdowns were the most ever in Colts history in a player's first two seasons.

==== 1982 season ====
The 1982 NFL season was shorted to a nine-game schedule due to a player's strike. Dickey's season was also cut short due to injuries. He appeared in eight games, with six starts. Dickey still finished the season as the Colts' third-leading rusher, behind McMillan and Zach Dixon, and tied for second on the team with 21 receptions. He finished with one touchdown, which he earned in week 16 against the San Diego Chargers.

The Colts ended the strike-shortened season with an 0–8–1 record, tying in week 15 against the Green Bay Packers. They became only the third team since the AFL-NFL merger to finish a regular season with a winless record.

==== 1983 season ====
In 1983, the Colts rebounded from their abysmal 1982 showing to a 7–9 record. Dickey also had a comeback season, starting all 16 games and had his most productive season in the NFL. He was the Colts leading rusher for the third time in four years, with 1,222 yards, and also was the team's leading receiving with 483 yards. He recorded four rushing touchdowns and three receiving touchdowns. The rushing duo of Dickey and McMillan led the AFC in rushing and was second-best in the NFL.

Following the 1983 season, Dickey began negotiating with the Houston Gamblers to switch to the upstart United States Football League due to a contract dispute with the Colts. However, Dickey decided to remain in the NFL and signed a new five-year contract to stay with the Colts. Later in the offseason, the team moved from Baltimore to Indianapolis, and Dickey joined them in their new city.

==== 1984 season ====
Expectations were high for Dickey's 1984 season. However, it was cut short by a knee injury. He missed six total games and ended the season on the injured reserve list before undergoing off-season arthroscopic surgery.

Dickey was productive when he was on the field, with 523 rushing yards and three rushing touchdowns. His best game of the season came in week three against the St. Louis Cardinals, where he had 23 rushes for 121 yards and one rushing touchdown while also throwing for a 63-yard touchdown reception to wide receiver Tracy Porter.

The Colts ended the season at 4–12, missing the playoffs for the seventh consecutive season. This was Dickey's last full season as a member of the Colts.

==== 1985 season ====
Dickey's knee injuries suffered in the 1984 season lingered into 1985, and he opened the season on the injured reserve list. He missed the first six weeks of the 1985 season before making his debut against the Buffalo Bills in week seven. Dickey came off the bench in that game, only recording three rushes for 11 yards.

Following the Colts' week 12 loss to the Kansas City Chiefs, Dickey was cut on November 25, 1985. Colts head coach Rod Dowhower cited a poor attitude as the reason for Dickey's mid-season release.

Dickey left the team as its then-fifth leading rusher in franchise history with 3,490 yards across six seasons.

=== Cleveland Browns (1985–1986) ===
==== 1985 season ====
The day following his release by the Colts, Dickey was claimed by the Cleveland Browns. He only appeared in one game with the Browns during the remainder of the 1985 regular season, recording two carries for six yards. He also recorded six rushes for 28 yards in the Browns' Divisional Round playoff loss to the Miami Dolphins.

==== 1986 season ====
In 1986, Dickey helped contribute to the Browns' 12–4 team. Dickey was relegated to backup role behind Kevin Mack, but still finished second on the team in rushing with 523 yards and six touchdowns. Led by quarterback Bernie Kosar, the Browns made it to the 1986 AFC Championship Game, where they lost 20–23 in overtime to the Denver Broncos.

Following the 1986 season, Dickey was cut by the Browns.

=== Professional statistics ===
Year	Team	Games		Rushing					Receiving				
Year	Team	GP	GS	Att	Yds	Avg	Lng	TD	Rec	Yds	Avg	Lng	TD
1980	BAL	15	5	176	800	4.5	51	11	25	204	8.2	32	2
1981	BAL	15	15	164	779	4.8	67	7	37	419	11.3	50	3
1982	BAL	8	6	66	232	3.5	25	1	21	228	10.9	34	0
1983	BAL	16	16	254	1,122	4.4	56	4	24	483	20.1	72	3
1984	IND	10	9	131	523	4.0	30	3	14	135	9.6	33	0
1985	IND	1	0	2	6	3.0	5	0	0	0	0.0	0	0
1985	CLE	6	0	9	34	3.8	11	0	3	30	10.0	11	0
1986	CLE	14	10	135	523	3.9	47	6	10	78	7.8	12	0
Career		85	61	937	4,019	4.3	67	32	134	1,577	11.8	72	8

== Personal life ==
Dickey returned to College Station, Texas after his football career ended, where he worked in the community. His nephew is former NFL player Ty Warren.
