= Hosea Taylor =

American football player (born 1958)

No. 90, 93
- Position: Defensive end

Personal information
- Born: December 3, 1958 (age 67); Jefferson, Texas, U.S.
- Listed height: 6 ft 5 in (1.96 m)
- Listed weight: 255 lb (116 kg)

Career information
- High school: Longview (Longview, Texas)
- College: Houston
- NFL draft: 1981: 8th round, 220th overall pick

Career history
- Baltimore Colts (1981–1983); Houston Gamblers (1984–1985)

Awards and highlights
- First-team All-American (1980); 2× First-team All-SWC (1978, 1979); Second-team All-SWC (1980)

Career NFL statistics
- Sacks: 2
- Fumble recoveries: 1
- Safeties: 1
- Stats at Pro Football Reference

Hosea Taylor (born December 3, 1958) is an American former professional football player who was a defensive end for the Baltimore Colts of the National Football League (NFL). He played 16 games in the 1981 NFL season and four games in the 1983 NFL season. Taylor played college football for the Houston Cougars and was a 1979 All-America and 1980 All-America selection.

Taylor graduated from Longview High School in Longview, Texas, in the late 1970s. His nephew Curtis Brown is a former cornerback for the Pittsburgh Steelers of the NFL.
