= Marvin Sims =

American football player (born 1957)

No. 39
- Position: Fullback

Personal information
- Born: June 18, 1957 (age 69); Columbus, Georgia, U.S.
- Listed height: 6 ft 4 in (1.93 m)
- Listed weight: 234 lb (106 kg)

Career information
- High school: Pacelli (Columbus)
- College: Clemson
- NFL draft: 1980: 12th round, 324th overall pick

Career history
- Baltimore Colts (1980–1981); New York Giants (1983)*
- * Offseason or practice squad member only

Career NFL statistics
- Rushing yards: 186
- Rushing average: 3.4
- Touchdowns: 2
- Stats at Pro Football Reference

Marvin Sims (born June 18, 1957) is an American former professional football player who was a fullback for the Baltimore Colts of the National Football League (NFL) from 1980 to 1981. He played college football for the Clemson Tigers.
