= Mike Wood (American football) =

American football player (born 1954)

No. 5, 19, 16
- Positions: Placekicker, punter

Personal information
- Born: September 3, 1954 (age 72); Kirkwood, Missouri, U.S.
- Listed height: 5 ft 11 in (1.80 m)
- Listed weight: 199 lb (90 kg)

Career information
- High school: Kirkwood (Missouri)
- College: Southeast Missouri State
- NFL draft: 1978: 8th round, 204th overall pick

Career history
- Minnesota Vikings (1978); St. Louis Cardinals (1978–1979); San Diego Chargers (1979–1980); Baltimore Colts (1981–1982); San Francisco 49ers (1983)

Awards and highlights
- Southeast Missouri State No. 67 retired

Career NFL statistics
- Field goals made: 29
- Field goal attempts: 49
- Field goal %: 59.2
- Longest field goal: 51
- Punts: 82
- Punt yards: 3,019
- Stats at Pro Football Reference

Michael Stephen Wood (born September 3, 1954) is an American former professional football player who was a placekicker and punter for five seasons in the National Football League (NFL) with the Minnesota Vikings, St. Louis Cardinals, San Diego Chargers and Baltimore Colts. He was selected by the Vikings in the eighth round of the 1978 NFL draft after playing college football for the Southeast Missouri State Redhawks.

== Early life and college ==
Michael Stephen Wood was born on September 3, 1954, in Kirkwood, Missouri. He attended Kirkwood High School in Kirkwood.

Wood was a four-year letterman for the Southeast Missouri State Redhawks of Southeast Missouri State University from 1974 to 1977. He set an NCAA record for career field goals. His number 67 was retired by Southeast Missouri State in 1978. Wood was inducted into the school's athletics hall of fame in 2002.

== Professional career ==
Wood was selected by the Minnesota Vikings in the eighth round, with the 204th overall pick, of the 1978 NFL draft. He played in seven games for the Vikings in 1978, punting 31 times for 1,100 yards. He was released on October 20, 1978.

Wood signed with the St. Louis Cardinals on October 26, 1978. He appeared in eight games for the Cardinals that year, recording 51 punts for 1,919 yards. He had the longest punt in the NFL that season with an 81-yarder. His two punts blocked were also tied for the most in the league that year with seven other players. Wood also completed a 29-yard pass while with the Cardinals in 1978. He was moved to placekicker in 1979 and played in three games for the Cardinals that season, converting two of seven field goals and six of seven extra points. He was released by the Cardinals on October 10, 1979.

Wood was signed by the San Diego Chargers on October 18, 1979. He appeared in nine games for the Chargers in 1979, converting 11 of 14 field goals and 28 of 31 extra points. He was named the Pro Football Weekly NFL Special Teams Player of the Week for Week 11 of the 1979 season. Wood also played in one playoff game that year, making two of two extra points and missing one field goal. Wood played in one game during the 1980 season before being placed on injured reserve on September 10, 1980.

In late August 1981, Wood was traded to the Baltimore Colts for a future draft pick. He played in all 16 for the only time of his career in 1981, converting ten of 18 field goals and 29 of 33 extra points. He appeared in six games for the Colts during the 1982 season, recording one of one field goals, six of six extra points, one fumble recovery, and a five-yard touchdown pass. Wood was released on December 15, 1982.

Wood signed with the San Francisco 49ers on July 16, 1983. He was placed on injured reserve on August 23, 1983, and missed the entire season. He was released in 1984.

== See also ==
- List of NCAA football retired numbers
