= Mike Woods (American football) =

American football player (1954–2009)

No. 30, 59
- Position: Linebacker

Personal information
- Born: November 1, 1954; Cleveland, Ohio, U.S.
- Died: May 29, 2009 (aged 54); Richmond Heights, Ohio, U.S.
- Listed height: 6 ft 2 in (1.88 m)
- Listed weight: 233 lb (106 kg)

Career information
- High school: Benedictine (Cleveland)
- College: Cincinnati
- NFL draft: 1978: 2nd round, 52nd overall pick

Career history
- Baltimore Colts (1978–1981)

Awards and highlights
- First-team All-American (1977)

Career NFL statistics
- Sacks: 3
- Fumble recoveries: 4
- Interceptions: 1
- Stats at Pro Football Reference

Michael Jay Woods (November 1, 1954 – May 29, 2009) was an American professional football player who was a linebacker for three seasons with the Baltimore Colts of the National Football League (NFL). He was selected by the Colts in the second round of the 1978 NFL draft. Woods played college football at Ellsworth Community College, the University of Tampa, and the University of Cincinnati.

== Early life ==
Woods participated in football, basketball and track and field at Benedictine High School in Cleveland, Ohio.

== College career ==
Woods first played college football at Ellsworth Community College. He then transferred to the University of Tampa. In 1975, he transferred to the University of Cincinnati after Tampa Spartans football was discontinued at the end of the 1974 season. He played for the Cincinnati Bearcats from 1975 to 1977. He was a first-team All-American in 1977 and the first graduate of the University of Cincinnati to earn All-American honors. Woods recorded 114 tackles as a senior. He was also selected to play in the Senior Bowl. He was inducted into the inaugural Bearcats Ring of Honor in 2006.

== Professional career ==
Woods was selected in the second round by the Baltimore Colts with the 52nd pick in the 1978 NFL draft. He played in 36 games for the Colts from 1979 to 1981, starting 19.

== Shooting ==
On May 21, 1982, Woods, who was still a member of the Colts at the time, went to a house in Cleveland to retrieve his father from all-night poker game. At the house he was shot in the neck in a robbery attempt. The injury paralyzed Woods, rendering him a quadriplegic for the last 27 years of his life. The shooter, 17-year-old Victor Gomez Jr., was arrested within a week.

Woods died on May 29, 2009.
