= Ernie Accorsi =

American football executive (1941–2026)

- Accorsi (far right), with Eli Manning and Tom Coughlin

Personal information
- Born: October 29, 1941; Hershey, Pennsylvania, U.S.
- Died: September 19, 2026 (aged 84); Camden, New Jersey, U.S.

Career information
- College: Wake Forest

Career history
- Baltimore Colts (1970–1974) Public relations director; National Football League (1975) Office staff; Baltimore Colts (1977–1981) Assistant general manager; Baltimore Colts (1982–1983) General manager; Cleveland Browns (1985–1992) Executive vice president & general manager; New York Giants (1994–1997) Assistant general manager; New York Giants (1998–2006) General manager

Awards and highlights
- New York Giants Ring of Honor
- Executive profile at Pro Football Reference

Ernest William Accorsi Jr. (October 29, 1941 – September 19, 2026) was an American professional football executive. He served as the general manager of three teams in the National Football League (NFL): the Baltimore Colts, Cleveland Browns, and New York Giants.

== Early life, education and early career ==
Accorsi was born in Hershey, Pennsylvania, on October 29, 1941. He was a 1963 graduate of Wake Forest University with a Bachelor of Arts in communication and membership in Theta Chi.

He served in the U.S. Army before getting his start in sports as a reporter for The Charlotte News. He later wrote for The Baltimore Sun and The Philadelphia Inquirer before moving to the athletic departments at Saint Joseph's University and then Penn State. He served as Penn State's Assistant Sports Publicity Director in the late 1960s.

== Professional football career ==
Accorsi began his NFL career in 1970 with the Baltimore Colts as its director of public relations, and worked on then-NFL Commissioner Pete Rozelle's staff in the league office from 1975 before rejoining the Colts two years later as an assistant general manager.

=== Baltimore Colts ===
Accorsi was promoted to general manager of the Colts in 1982. The Colts finished 0–8–1 in the strike-shortened 1982 season, thereby earning the right to select Stanford University quarterback John Elway with the first overall pick. Elway, however, refused to play for Baltimore, and using leverage as a draftee of the New York Yankees baseball club, forced a trade to the Denver Broncos. However, it was not Accorsi, but the team owner Bob Irsay who made the trade. According to Sports Illustrated, "If another team wanted to draft [Elway], it would have had to fork over three first-round draft picks in exchange. That was Accorsi's price. When no other team met it, the Colts drafted him. Elway said the Colts had wasted a draft choice. He would play baseball. 'I covered minor league baseball when I was a sports-writer,' recalled Accorsi .... 'Elway wasn't going to give up a chance at the Hall of Fame to play in Greensboro, North Carolina, which is exactly where he would have been sent. If we'd been patient we could have signed him.' Instead, Irsay traded him within a week, without consulting either Accorsi or then head coach Frank Kush. Denver gave up its own No. 1 pick in 1983 (offensive lineman Chris Hinton), its first pick in the 1984 draft (which they later used to draft Ron Solt) and quarterback Mark Herrmann."

The team finished 7–9 in 1983, but that would be their last season in Baltimore. Accorsi resigned as GM after the 1983 season, just before the team's move to Indianapolis.

=== Cleveland Browns ===
In 1985, Accorsi was hired by then Cleveland Browns owner Art Modell to serve as the team's new general manager and executive vice president of football operations, serving for seven seasons. Accorsi was responsible for the acquisition of quarterback Bernie Kosar in the 1985 supplemental draft. During his tenure, the Browns made five playoff appearances and got to the AFC Championship Game three times, but lost each time to Elway's Broncos. Accorsi resigned in 1992.

=== New York Giants ===
Accorsi joined the Giants in 1994 and served as an assistant to the general manager, legendary George Young, until he succeeded Young in 1998.

The Giants made one Super Bowl appearance under Accorsi in Super Bowl XXXV, which they lost to the Baltimore Ravens, 34–7. They won two NFC East division titles (2000 and 2005) while making the playoffs four times (2000, 2002, 2005, and 2006).

Accorsi's highest profile personnel move came at the 2004 NFL draft, where he traded Giants first-round draft choice quarterback Philip Rivers and three draft picks (a third-round pick in 2004 and first-round and 5th-round picks in 2005) to the San Diego Chargers for their first overall draft choice quarterback Eli Manning, which gave the Giants a young franchise quarterback. The move met with the approval of Giants fans, who cheered loudly when the trade was announced by Commissioner Paul Tagliabue.

Manning then led the Giants to playoff appearances in 2005 and 2006. In 2007, Manning led the Giants to three straight road playoff victories, culminating in a victory over the then-undefeated New England Patriots in Super Bowl XLII. Following the 2011 season, Manning would capture the Super Bowl XLVI title. Manning was named MVP of both Super Bowl XLII and XLVI, validating Accorsi's belief that Manning was a star talent.

Accorsi was also responsible for drafting Osi Umenyiora, Chris Snee, Justin Tuck, Mathias Kiwanuka, and Brandon Jacobs, as well as signing Antonio Pierce, Kareem McKenzie, Plaxico Burress, and Fred Robbins as free agents. He hired former head coach Tom Coughlin after the dismissal of Jim Fassel following the 2003 season.

Accorsi expressed a desire to retire several times prior to the end of the 2006 season (stating the 2002 and 2005 seasons in particular). Insisting that the team still had quality talent that could be handled well for his successor, he retired at the close of the 2006 season. He was replaced by Jerry Reese.

Although not a member of the staff in 2007, Accorsi was given a Super Bowl ring after the Giants win against the New England Patriots in Super Bowl XLII.

As a general manager for three teams, Accorsi went 138–140–2.

== Consultant career ==
On November 9, 2012, Accorsi was hired by the Carolina Panthers as a consultant after general manager Marty Hurney was fired.

On December 29, 2014, it was announced that Accorsi had been hired by the Chicago Bears as a consultant for their general manager search after Phil Emery was fired. That search resulted in the hiring of Ryan Pace.

On November 25, 2015, Accorsi was named a consultant for the Detroit Lions' search for a new general manager.

Accorsi was named as a special adviser to the team on January 10, 2016, after he assisted the Lions in their search for general manager Bob Quinn.

On December 4, 2017, John Mara stated in a press conference that Accorsi would assist the New York Giants in hiring a replacement for former general manager Jerry Reese.

On January 9, 2019, Michael Bidwill stated in a press conference that Accorsi had assisted the Arizona Cardinals in hiring Kliff Kingsbury as head coach.

He was a member of the 13-person panel that selected the Top 100 Players in Giants history.

== Personal life and death ==
Accorsi served as an analyst for the NFL Network coverage of the 2008 Senior Bowl.

Accorsi died in Camden, New Jersey, on September 19, 2026, at the age of 84.

== See also ==
- History of the New York Giants (1994–present)
