= Tim Sherwin =

American football player (born 1958)

No. 83, 87
- Position: Tight end

Personal information
- Born: May 4, 1958 (age 68); Troy, New York, U.S.
- Listed height: 6 ft 6 in (1.98 m)
- Listed weight: 243 lb (110 kg)

Career information
- College: Boston College
- NFL draft: 1981: 4th round, 94th overall pick

Career history
- Baltimore/Indianapolis Colts (1981–1987); New York Giants (1988)

Career NFL statistics
- Receptions: 76
- Receiving yards: 1,002
- Receiving touchdowns: 2
- Stats at Pro Football Reference

Timothy Sherwin (born May 4, 1958) is an American former professional football player who was a tight end for seven seasons in the National Football League (NFL) with the Baltimore/Indianapolis Colts and New York Giants. He played college football for the Boston College Eagles. He was selected by the Colts in the fourth round of the 1981 NFL draft with the 94th overall pick.
