= Ricky Jones (American football) =

American football player (born 1955)

No. 47, 51
- Position: Linebacker

Personal information
- Born: March 9, 1955 (age 71); Birmingham, Alabama, U.S.
- Listed height: 6 ft 1 in (1.85 m)
- Listed weight: 211 lb (96 kg)

Career information
- High school: Woodlawn (Birmingham)
- College: Tuskegee
- NFL draft: 1977: undrafted

Career history
- Cleveland Browns (1977–1979); Baltimore Colts (1980–1983)

Career NFL statistics
- Sacks: 2
- Fumble recoveries: 4
- Stats at Pro Football Reference

Ricky Jones (born March 9, 1955) is an American former professional football player who was a linebacker for seven seasons for the Cleveland Browns and Baltimore Colts of the National Football League (NFL). He played college football for the Tuskegee Golden Tigers.
