= Zachary Dixon =

American football player (born 1956)

No. 31, 34, 25
- Position: Running back

Personal information
- Born: March 5, 1956 (age 70); Boston, Massachusetts, U.S.
- Listed height: 6 ft 0 in (1.83 m)
- Listed weight: 200 lb (91 kg)

Career information
- High school: Cathedral (Boston)
- College: Temple
- NFL draft: 1979: 11th round, 297th overall pick

Career history
- Denver Broncos (1979); New York Giants (1979); Philadelphia Eagles (1980); Baltimore Colts (1980–1982); Seattle Seahawks (1983–1984)

Awards and highlights
- Second-team All-East (1978)

Career NFL statistics
- Rushing yards: 732
- Rushing average: 3.7
- Rushing touchdowns: 3
- Stats at Pro Football Reference

Zachary C. Dixon (born March 5, 1956) is an American former professional football player who was a running back in the National Football League (NFL) for the Denver Broncos, New York Giants, Philadelphia Eagles, Baltimore Colts and Seattle Seahawks. He played college football for the Temple Owls.

== Biography ==
Born in Boston, Dixon grew up in the Dorchester neighborhood. He played scholastically at Cathedral High School and collegiately at Dean College in Franklin, Massachusetts, and Temple University in Philadelphia.

He was originally drafted by the Denver Broncos in the 11th round of the 1979 NFL Draft. In six seasons he had 197 rushing attempts for 732 yards and 3 touchdowns as well as 41 receptions for 367 yards and 1 touchdown. Used primarily on special teams, he had 128 kickoff returns for 2,634 yards and 1 touchdown. In 1983, while playing for the Baltimore Colts and Seattle Seahawks, he led the NFL in kick returns (51) and kick return yards (1,171).

In the late 1980s, he briefly worked in the Maryland area for Circuit City Stores, Inc as a sales counselor.

He is the father of former Seahawks defensive end Raheem Brock. He is the brother of retired professional women's basketball player Medina Dixon.
