= Jeff Hart (gridiron football) =

American gridiron football player (born 1953)

Profile
- Position: Offensive tackle

Personal information
- Born: September 10, 1953 (age 73); Portland, Oregon, U.S.

Career information
- College: Oregon State
- NFL draft: 1975: 3rd round, 71st overall pick

Career history
- 1975: San Francisco 49ers
- 1976: New Orleans Saints
- 1977–1978: Winnipeg Blue Bombers
- 1979–1983: Baltimore Colts
- 1984–1985: Los Angeles Express

Awards and highlights
- First-team All-Pac-8 (1974)
- Stats at Pro Football Reference

Jeffrey Allen Hart (born September 10, 1953) is an American former professional football offensive lineman who played seven seasons in the National Football League (NFL), two seasons in the Canadian Football League (CFL), and two seasons in the United States Football League (USFL).
