= Cleveland Franklin =

American football player (born 1955)

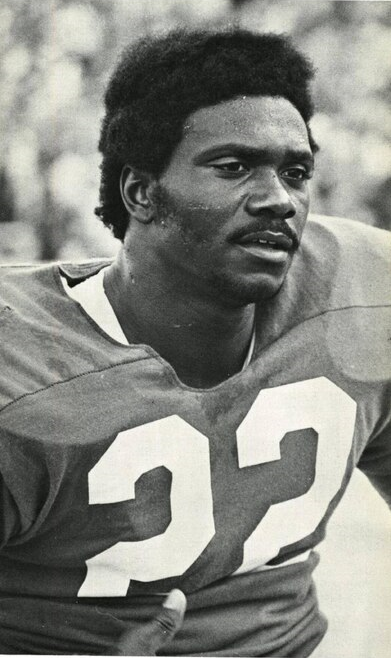
- Franklin with the Baylor Bears, c. 1976

No. 30, 38, 28
- Position: Running back

Personal information
- Born: April 24, 1955 (age 71); Brenham, Texas, U.S.
- Listed height: 6 ft 2 in (1.88 m)
- Listed weight: 216 lb (98 kg)

Career information
- High school: Brenham
- College: Baylor
- NFL draft: 1977: 8th round, 202nd overall pick

Career history
- Philadelphia Eagles (1977–1978); Baltimore Colts (1979–1982)

Awards and highlights
- Second-team All-SWC (1975)

Career NFL statistics
- Rushing attempts-yards: 208-635
- Receptions-yards: 36-258
- Touchdowns: 3
- Stats at Pro Football Reference

Cleveland Franklin (born April 24, 1955) is an American former professional football player who was a running back in the National Football League (NFL). He played college football for the Baylor Bears. He played in the NFL for the Philadelphia Eagles from 1977 to 1978 and the Baltimore Colts from 1980 to 1982.
