= Kim Anderson (American football) =

American football player (born 1957)

No. 26
- Position: Safety

Personal information
- Born: July 19, 1957 (age 69); Pasadena, California, U.S.
- Listed height: 5 ft 11 in (1.80 m)
- Listed weight: 183 lb (83 kg)

Career information
- High school: Pasadena
- College: Arizona State
- NFL draft: 1979: 3rd round, 69th overall pick

Career history
- Baltimore / Indianapolis Colts (1979–1984)

Awards and highlights
- First-team All-Pac-10 (1978)

Career NFL statistics
- Interceptions: 7
- Fumble recoveries: 6
- Touchdowns: 1
- Stats at Pro Football Reference

Kim Sherwood Anderson (born July 19, 1957) is an American former professional football player who was a safety in the National Football League (NFL). He played college football for the Arizona State Sun Devils and was selected by the Baltimore Colts in the third round of the 1979 NFL draft. Anderson finished his career in 1985 when he signed with the Arizona Outlaws of the United States Football League (USFL) on April 1, 1985.

== Football experience ==
He played college football at Pasadena City College and Arizona State University.

He played his entire five seasons in the NFL with the Colts and one season with the USFL's Arizona Outlaws in 1985.

== Honors and awards ==
In 1983, Anderson recorded one interception for a touchdown, placing him tied for ninth place overall that year. Also that same year, he recorded the second longest interception return with seventy one yards.

== Current life ==
Currently, Anderson works as an internet marketing consultant in Los Angeles.
