= Reese McCall =

American football player (born 1956)

No. 86, 81
- Position: Tight end

Personal information
- Born: June 16, 1956 (age 70); Bessemer, Alabama, U.S.
- Listed height: 6 ft 6 in (1.98 m)
- Listed weight: 239 lb (108 kg)

Career information
- College: Auburn
- NFL draft: 1978: 1st round, 25th overall pick

Career history
- Baltimore Colts (1978–1982); Detroit Lions (1983–1985)

Career NFL statistics
- Receptions: 94
- Receiving yards: 1,366
- Touchdowns: 12
- Stats at Pro Football Reference

Reese McCall II (born June 16, 1956) is an American former professional football player who was a tight end for eight seasons in the National Football League (NFL).

== Biography ==
McCall attended Auburn University, playing college football for the Auburn Tigers. He played in the Senior Bowl. He was drafted, in 1978, by the Baltimore Colts. He played with them until 1983, when he was acquired by the Detroit Lions, playing 3 seasons with them.

McCall had a son, Reese McCall III, who played soccer and basketball at Fairfield High School.
