= Derrick Hatchett =

American football player (born 1958)

No. 42, 21
- Position: Cornerback

Personal information
- Born: August 14, 1958 (age 68); Bryan, Texas, U.S.
- Listed height: 5 ft 11 in (1.80 m)
- Listed weight: 182 lb (83 kg)

Career information
- High school: John Jay (San Antonio, Texas)
- College: Texas
- NFL draft: 1980: 1st round, 24th overall pick

Career history
- Baltimore Colts (1980–1983); Houston Oilers (1983); Los Angeles Raiders (1984)*
- * Offseason or practice squad member only

Awards and highlights
- Second-team All-American (1979)

Career NFL statistics
- Interceptions: 7
- Fumble recoveries: 1
- Stats at Pro Football Reference

Derrick Kingston Hatchett (born August 14, 1958) is an American former professional football player who was a cornerback in the National Football League (NFL). He was a member of the Baltimore Colts from 1980 to 1983 and the Houston Oilers in 1983. He was released from the Colts and later signed with the Oilers after stating that he was punched by head coach Frank Kush, which the coach denied and threatened to sue in response.
