= 1976 Baltimore Colts season =

24th season in franchise history

- Owner: Robert Irsay
- General manager: Joe Thomas
- Head coach: Ted Marchibroda
- Home stadium: Memorial Stadium

Results
- Record: 11–3
- Division place: T-1st AFC East
- Playoffs: Lost Divisional Playoffs (vs. Steelers) 14–40
- Pro Bowlers: T George Kunz; QB Bert Jones; WR Roger Carr; RB Lydell Mitchell; DE John Dutton; K Toni Linhart

The 1976 Baltimore Colts season was the 24th season for the team in the National Football League. Led by second-year head coach Ted Marchibroda, the Colts finished with a record of 11 wins and 3 losses, tied for first in the AFC East division with the New England Patriots. Baltimore won the AFC East title based on a better division record (7–1 to Patriots' 6–2).

Marchibroda, the reigning NFL coach of the year, resigned a week before the regular season opener, due to a power struggle with general manager Joe Thomas and owner Robert Irsay. Baltimore had won its first two preseason games, then dropped the final four. Several Colts assistant coaches threatened to leave the team, and quarterback Bert Jones publicly came to his coach's defense. Thomas and Irsay quickly made amends with the coach before the season started. (Thomas would be fired by the team shortly after the season.)

The Colts’ offense was dominant in 1976: they led the league in scoring with 417 points (29.7 per game). Jones was named league MVP after passing for a league-best 3,104 yards, 9.27 yards-per-attempt, and a passer rating of 102.5, second best in the NFL. Running back Lydell Mitchell also had a spectacular year, rushing for 1,200 yards, and catching 60 passes. Wide receiver Roger Carr proved to be a valuable deep threat in the passing game, leading the league with 1,112 receiving yards and 25.9 yards per reception. All three offensive players made the Pro Bowl team.

== Offseason ==
=== 1976 expansion draft ===
Baltimore Colts selected during the expansion draft
Round	Overall	Name	Position	Expansion team
0	0	Mike Curtis	Linebacker	Seattle Seahawks
0	0	Bill Olds	Fullback	Seattle Seahawks
0	0	Dave Pear	Defensive tackle	Tampa Bay Buccaneers

=== Draft ===
1976 Baltimore Colts draft
Round	Pick	Player	Position	College	Notes
1	20	Ken Novak	Defensive tackle	Purdue	
3	81	Ed Simonini	Linebacker	Texas A&M	
3	90	Ron Lee	Running back	West Virginia	
5	134	Sanders Shiver	Linebacker	Carson–Newman	
5	143	Mike Kirkland	Quarterback	Arkansas	Played for Colts in 1978
8	228	Ricky Thompson	Wide receiver	Baylor	
9	258	Stu Levenick	Tackle	Illinois	
10	283	Tim Baylor	Defensive back	Morgan State	
11	310	Rick Gibney	Defensive tackle	Georgia Tech	
12	340	Frank Stavroff	Placekicker	Indiana	
14	394	Jeremiah Cummings	Defensive end	Albany State	
15	424	Gary Alexander	Tackle	Clemson	
16	449	Mike Fuhrman	Tight end	Memphis State	
16	451	Steve Ludwig	Center	Miami (FL)	
Made roster * Made at least one Pro Bowl during career

== Personnel ==
=== Staff ===
1976 Baltimore Colts staff
Front office: President and treasurer – Robert Irsay; General manager – Joe Thomas; Assistant general manager – Ernie Accorsi; Coaching staff: Head coach – Ted Marchibroda; Offensive coaches: Receivers – Pete McCulley; Offensive line – Whitey Dovell	Defensive coaches: Defensive coordinator/linebackers – Maxie Baughan; Defensive line – Jerry Smith; Defensive backfield – Frank Lauterbur; Special teams coaches: Special teams – George Boutselis

=== Final roster ===
1976 Baltimore Colts roster
Quarterbacks (QB): 7 Bert Jones; 15 Mike Kirkland; 12 Bill Troup; Running backs (RB): 48 Roosevelt Leaks; 34 Ron Lee; 23 Don McCauley; 26 Lydell Mitchell; 27 Howard Stevens; Wide receivers (WR): 81 Roger Carr; 35 Glenn Doughty; 86 Freddie Scott; 88 Ricky Thompson; Tight ends (TE): 87 Raymond Chester; 85 Jimmie Kennedy	Offensive linemen (OL): 50 Forrest Blue C; 66 Elmer Collett G; 62 Ken Huff G; 75 George Kunz T; 57 Ken Mendenhall C; 61 Robert Pratt G; 64 David Taylor T; 67 Bob Van Duyne T; Defensive linemen (DL): 63 Mike Barnes DT; 72 Fred Cook DE; 78 John Dutton DE; 76 Joe Ehrmann DT; 73 Ron Fernandes DE; 74 Ken Novak DT	Linebackers (LB): 59 Jim Cheyunski MLB; 55 Dan Dickel OLB; 58 Derrel Luce OLB; 54 Sanders Shiver OLB; 56 Ed Simonini MLB; 53 Stan White OLB; Defensive backs (DB): 47 Tim Baylor FS; 33 Randy Hall SS; 40 Bruce Laird SS; 42 Lloyd Mumphord CB; 25 Ray Oldham CB; 46 Bryant Salter FS; 20 Jackie Wallace FS; Special teams (ST): 49 David Lee P; 2 Toni Linhart K	Reserve: 29 Marshall Johnson WR (IR); 52 Tom MacLeod OLB (IR); 31 Nelson Munsey CB (IR); 30 Doug Nettles CB (IR); Rookies in italics

== Preseason ==
Week	Date	Opponent	Result	Record	Venue	Attendance
1	July 31	at Cleveland Browns	W 21–0	1–0	Memorial Stadium (Lincoln)	20,304
2	August 6	Washington Redskins	W 20–3	2–0	Memorial Stadium	35,575
3	August 14	at Chicago Bears	L 14–25	2–1	Soldier Field	54,338
4	August 20	New Orleans Saints	L 20–26 (OT)	2–2	Memorial Stadium	38,879
5	August 28	at Atlanta Falcons	L 7–21	2–3	Atlanta Stadium	24,986
6	September 2	at Detroit Lions	L 9–24	2–4	Pontiac Metropolitan Stadium	54,217

== Regular season ==
=== Schedule ===
Week	Date	Opponent	Result	Record	Venue	Attendance	Recap
1	September 12	at **New England Patriots**	**W** 27–13	1–0	Schaefer Stadium	43,512	Link
2	September 19	Cincinnati Bengals	**W** 28–27	2–0	Memorial Stadium	50,374	Link
3	September 26	at Dallas Cowboys	**L** 27–30	2–1	Texas Stadium	64,237	Link
4	October 3	Tampa Bay Buccaneers	**W** 42–17	3–1	Memorial Stadium	40,053	Link
5	October 10	**Miami Dolphins**	**W** 28–14	4–1	Memorial Stadium	58,832	Link
6	October 17	at **Buffalo Bills**	**W** 31–13	5–1	Rich Stadium	71,009	Link
7	October 24	at **New York Jets**	**W** 20–0	6–1	Shea Stadium	59,576	Link
8	November 1	Houston Oilers	**W** 38–14	7–1	Memorial Stadium	60,020	Link
9	November 7	at San Diego Chargers	**W** 37–21	8–1	San Diego Stadium	42,827	Link
10	November 14	**New England Patriots**	**L** 14–21	8–2	Memorial Stadium	58,226	Link
11	November 22	at **Miami Dolphins**	**W** 17–16	9–2	Miami Orange Bowl	62,104	Link
12	November 28	**New York Jets**	**W** 33–16	10–2	Memorial Stadium	44,023	Link
13	December 4	at St. Louis Cardinals	**L** 17–24	10–3	Busch Memorial Stadium	48,282	Link
14	December 12	**Buffalo Bills**	**W** 58–20	11–3	Memorial Stadium	50,451	Link
Note: Intra-division opponents are in **bold** text.

=== Standings ===
AFC East
	W	L	T	PCT	DIV	CONF	PF	PA	STK
^{(2)} Baltimore Colts	11	3	0	.786	7–1	11–1	417	246	W1
^{(4)} New England Patriots	11	3	0	.786	6–2	10–2	376	236	W6
Miami Dolphins	6	8	0	.429	5–3	6–6	263	264	L1
New York Jets	3	11	0	.214	2–6	3–9	169	383	L4
Buffalo Bills	2	12	0	.143	0–8	2–10	245	363	L10

== Postseason ==
The team returned to the playoffs as a No. 2 seed and hosted the Pittsburgh Steelers in the divisional round. The Colts fell behind 26–7 at the half, and lost 40–14. This game is better remembered for the post-game crash of a private plane into an unoccupied section of Memorial Stadium.

Round	Date	Opponent	Result	Record	Venue	Attendance	Recap
Divisional	December 19	Pittsburgh Steelers (3)	L 14–40	0–1	Memorial Stadium	60,020	Link

== See also ==
- History of the Indianapolis Colts
- Indianapolis Colts seasons
- Colts–Patriots rivalry
