= 1974 Baltimore Colts season =

22nd season in franchise history

- Owner: Robert Irsay
- General manager: Joe Thomas
- Head coach: Howard Schnellenberger; Joe Thomas
- Home stadium: Memorial Stadium

Results
- Record: 2–12
- Division place: 5th AFC East
- Playoffs: Did not qualify
- Pro Bowlers: LB Mike Curtis

The 1974 Baltimore Colts season was the 22nd season for the team in the National Football League. The Colts finished with a record of 2 wins and 12 losses, fifth in the AFC East.

Second-year head coach Howard Schnellenberger was fired after three games, after an argument with owner Robert Irsay over whether Marty Domres or Bert Jones should start at quarterback for the Colts.

General manager Joe Thomas took over the head coaching duties for the remainders of the season, but could direct the team to only two wins, both on the road, as the Colts failed to win a home game during the 1974 season. This would be the last time the Colts would fail to win a home game in a non-strike season until their abysmal 1–15 1991 season, when the team was based in Indianapolis.

== Offseason ==
=== NFL draft ===
1974 Baltimore Colts draft
| Round | Pick | Player | Position | College | Notes |
| 1 | 5 | John Dutton * | Defensive end | Nebraska | |
| 1 | 24 | Roger Carr * | Wide receiver | Louisiana Tech | |
| 2 | 32 | Fred Cook | Defensive end | Southern Miss | |
| 3 | 57 | Glenn Robinson | Linebacker | Oklahoma State | |
| 3 | 67 | Robert Pratt | Guard | North Carolina | |
| 4 | 84 | Tony Bell | Defensive back | Bowling Green | |
| 5 | 129 | Doug Nettles | Defensive back | Vanderbilt | |
| 6 | 140 | Danny Rhodes | Linebacker | Arkansas | |
| 7 | 161 | Noah Jackson | Guard | Tampa | |
| 7 | 170 | Dan Dickel | Linebacker | Iowa | |
| 7 | 174 | Freddie Scott | Wide receiver | Amherst | |
| 8 | 188 | Greg Latta | Tight end | Morgan State | |
| 8 | 198 | Paul Miles | Running back | Bowling Green | |
| 10 | 240 | Bob Van Duyne | Guard | Idaho | |
| 10 | 257 | Glenn Ellis | Defensive tackle | Elon | |
| 11 | 265 | Tim Rudnick | Defensive back | Notre Dame | |
| 12 | 292 | Dave Simonson | Tackle | Minnesota | |
| 12 | 307 | Bob Bobrowski | Quarterback | Purdue | |
| 13 | 317 | Randy Hall | Defensive back | Idaho | |
| 14 | 344 | Ed Collins | Wide receiver | Rice | |
| 15 | 369 | Pat Kelly | Linebacker | Richmond | |
| 16 | 396 | Dave Margavage | Tackle | Kentucky | |
| 17 | 421 | Tim Berra | Wide receiver | UMass | |
| 17 | 436 | Buzzy Lewis | Defensive back | Florida State | |
Made roster * Made at least one Pro Bowl during career

== Staff ==
1974 Baltimore Colts staff
| Front office: President and treasurer – Robert Irsay; General manager – Joe Thomas; Head coaches: Head coach – Howard Schnellenberger (fired after 0–3 start); Interim head coach - Joe Thomas (2–9); Offensive coaches: Receivers – Pete McCulley; Running backs - George Sefcik; Offensive coordinator/offensive line – George Young | Defensive coaches: Defensive coordinator/defensive backfield – Don Doll; Defensive line – Jerry Smith; Linebackers coach – Frank Lauterbur |

=== Final roster ===
1974 Baltimore Colts roster
| Quarterbacks (QB): 14 Marty Domres; 7 Bert Jones; 12 Bill Troup; Running backs (RB): 36 John Andrews; 23 Don McCauley; 26 Lydell Mitchell; 38 Bill Olds; 37 Joe Orduna; Wide receivers (WR): 84 Tim Berra; 81 Roger Carr; 35 Glenn Doughty; 86 Freddie Scott; 80 Ollie Smith; 28 Cotton Speyrer; Tight ends (TE): 87 Raymond Chester; 83 Ron Mayo | Offensive linemen (OL): 66 Elmer Collett G; 57 Ken Mendenhall C; 50 Dan Neal C; 68 Dennis Nelson T; 61 Robert Pratt G; 62 Glenn Ressler G; 60 Dave Simonson T; 64 David Taylor T; 67 Bob Van Duyne G; Defensive linemen (DL): 63 Mike Barnes DT/DE; 79 Jim Bailey DT; 72 Fred Cook DE; 78 John Dutton DE; 76 Joe Ehrmann DT; 74 Steve Williams DT/DE; 65 Bill Windauer DT | Linebackers (LB): 51 Tony Bertuca OLB; 32 Mike Curtis MLB; 55 Dan Dickel OLB; 52 Tom MacLeod OLB; 56 Danny Rhodes MLB; 53 Stan White OLB; Defensive backs (DB): 33 Randy Hall CB; 40 Bruce Laird SS; 31 Nelson Munsey CB; 30 Doug Nettles CB; 25 Ray Oldham CB; 43 Tim Rudnick SS; 21 Rick Volk FS; Special teams (ST): 49 David Lee P; 2 Toni Linhart K | Reserve: 71 Gery Palmer T (IR); Rookies in italics |

== Regular season ==
All-Pro linebacker Ted Hendricks signed a future contract with the World Football League, and was then traded by the Colts to the Green Bay Packers by general manager Joe Thomas. (Hendricks never ended up playing for the bankrupt WFL, and made four more Pro Bowls in his career.)

In an autopsy of the Colts 1974 season written for Street & Smith's Pro Football Annual, Buffalo Evening News writer Larry Felser observed that the patience of Baltimore fans was waning, with the perennially sold-out Memorial Stadium had failed to crack the 40,000 mark at the gate on multiple occasions. "When Joe Thomas arrived on the scene as general manager in 1972, he promised to tear down a decaying team and rebuild it into a champion," Felser wrote. "He produced on the first part of his vow; the Baltimore fans are waiting for the other shoe to drop."

=== Schedule ===
| Week | Date | Opponent | Result | Record | Venue | Attendance | Game Recap |
|---|---|---|---|---|---|---|---|
| 1 | September 15 | at Pittsburgh Steelers | **L** 0–30 | 0–1 | Three Rivers Stadium | 48,890 | Recap |
| 2 | September 22 | Green Bay Packers | **L** 13–20 | 0–2 | Memorial Stadium | 41,252 | Recap |
| 3 | September 29 | at Philadelphia Eagles | **L** 10–30 | 0–3 | Veterans Stadium | 64,205 | Recap |
| 4 | October 6 | at **New England Patriots** | **L** 3–42 | 0–4 | Schaefer Stadium | 59,502 | Recap |
| 5 | October 13 | **Buffalo Bills** | **L** 14–27 | 0–5 | Memorial Stadium | 40,626 | Recap |
| 6 | October 20 | at **New York Jets** | **W** 35–20 | 1–5 | Shea Stadium | 51,745 | Recap |
| 7 | October 27 | at **Miami Dolphins** | **L** 7–17 | 1–6 | Orange Bowl | 65,868 | Recap |
| 8 | November 3 | Cincinnati Bengals | **L** 14–24 | 1–7 | Memorial Stadium | 36,110 | Recap |
| 9 | November 10 | Denver Broncos | **L** 6–17 | 1–8 | Memorial Stadium | 33,244 | Recap |
| 10 | November 17 | at Atlanta Falcons | **W** 17–7 | 2–8 | Atlanta Stadium | 41,278 | Recap |
| 11 | November 24 | **New England Patriots** | **L** 17–27 | 2–9 | Memorial Stadium | 34,782 | Recap |
| 12 | December 1 | at **Buffalo Bills** | **L** 0–6 | 2–10 | Rich Stadium | 75,325 | Recap |
| 13 | December 8 | **Miami Dolphins** | **L** 16–17 | 2–11 | Memorial Stadium | 34,420 | Recap |
| 14 | December 15 | **New York Jets** | **L** 38–45 | 2–12 | Memorial Stadium | 31,651 | Recap |
Note: Intra-division opponents are in **bold** text.

=== Standings ===
AFC East
| | W | L | T | PCT | DIV | CONF | PF | PA | STK |
|---|---|---|---|---|---|---|---|---|---|
| Miami Dolphins | 11 | 3 | 0 | .786 | 6–2 | 9–2 | 327 | 216 | W3 |
| Buffalo Bills | 9 | 5 | 0 | .643 | 5–3 | 7–4 | 264 | 244 | L2 |
| New York Jets | 7 | 7 | 0 | .500 | 4–4 | 5–6 | 279 | 300 | W6 |
| New England Patriots | 7 | 7 | 0 | .500 | 4–4 | 4–7 | 348 | 289 | L3 |
| Baltimore Colts | 2 | 12 | 0 | .143 | 1–7 | 1–10 | 190 | 329 | L4 |

=== Season summary ===
==== Week 2 vs Packers ====
Week Two: Green Bay Packers (0–1) at Baltimore Colts (0–1)

| Quarter | 1 | 2 | 3 | 4 | Total |
|---|---|---|---|---|---|
| **Packers** | 3 | 10 | 7 | 0 | **20** |
| Colts | 3 | 3 | 0 | 7 | **13** |

at Memorial Stadium, Baltimore, Maryland

- Date: September 22
- Game time: 2:00 p.m. EST
- Game weather: 61 °F (16 °C)
- Game attendance: 41,252
- Box Score

Game information

**First quarter**

- GB – Chester Marcol 52-yard field goal. Packers 3–0. Drive:
- BAL – Toni Linhart 37-yard field goal. Tie 3–3. Drive:

**Second quarter**

- GB – MacArthur Lane 1-yard run (Chester Marcol kick). Packers 10–3. Drive:
- GB – Chester Marcol 39-yard field goal. Packers 13–3. Drive:
- BAL – Toni Linhart 23-yard field goal. Packers 13–6. Drive:

**Third quarter**

- GB – MacArthur Lane 13-yard run (Chester Marcol kick). Packers 20–6. Drive:

**Fourth quarter**

- BAL – Bill Olds 7-yard pass from Bert Jones (Toni Linhart kick). Packers 20–13. Drive:

Top passers

- GB – Jerry Tagge – 10/16, 109 yards, INT
- BAL – Bert Jones – 7/16, 88 yards, TD, INT

Top rushers

- GB – MacArthur Lane – 22 rushes, 36 yards, 2 TD
- BAL – Lydell Mitchell – 18 rushes, 63 yards

Top receivers

- GB – Jon Staggers – 3 receptions, 52 yards
- BAL – Lydell Mitchell – 5 receptions, 47 yards

== See also ==
- History of the Indianapolis Colts
- Indianapolis Colts seasons
- Colts–Patriots rivalry
