= List of Indianapolis Colts seasons =

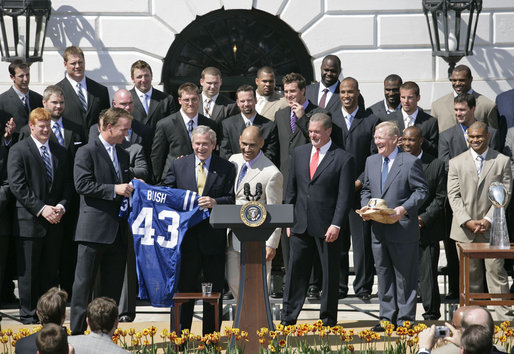
Then-U.S. President George W. Bush congratulates the Colts on their Super Bowl XLI victory.

The Indianapolis Colts, formerly the Baltimore Colts, are an American football team playing in the National Football League (NFL). This list documents the season-by-season records of the Colts franchise from 1953 to present, including postseason records and league awards for individual players or head coaches. In 1953, a Baltimore-based group led by Carroll Rosenbloom gained the rights to a new Baltimore franchise. Rosenbloom was granted an NFL team, and was awarded the holdings of the defunct Dallas Texans organization, the descendant of the last remaining Ohio League founding APFA member Dayton Triangles. The new team kept the Triangles' blue and white color scheme and was named the Colts after the unrelated previous team that folded after the 1950 NFL season. After 31 seasons in Baltimore, Colts owner Robert Irsay moved the team to Indianapolis, Indiana.

The Colts have won two Super Bowl championships (Super Bowl V and Super Bowl XLI). They also played in and lost Super Bowl III and Super Bowl XLIV. Before the AFL and NFL merged in 1970, they won three NFL Championships (1958, 1959, and 1968). By winning Super Bowl XLI the Colts became the first team that played its home games in a domed stadium to win a Super Bowl held in an outdoor stadium.

After the Colts owner Jim Irsay hired Tony Dungy in 2002, the Colts made the playoffs for nine straight seasons. They won five straight AFC South titles from 2003 to 2007 and had seven consecutive seasons of 12 or more victories from 2003 to 2009, the first time that has been achieved in the NFL's 90-year history. Much of the team's success throughout the 2000s was attributed to the trio of general manager Bill Polian, coach Dungy, and quarterback Peyton Manning.

In the 2013 season, the Colts secured their first division championship since Manning's departure and first under quarterback Andrew Luck and head coach Chuck Pagano. As of 2026, they are the only team in the AFC South to win a Super Bowl (the Tennessee Titans have not won any Super Bowls either in Tennessee or in their previous incarnation as the Houston Oilers, while the Colts won the Super Bowl in 1970 while in Baltimore and the 2006 title while in Indianapolis).

== Table key ==
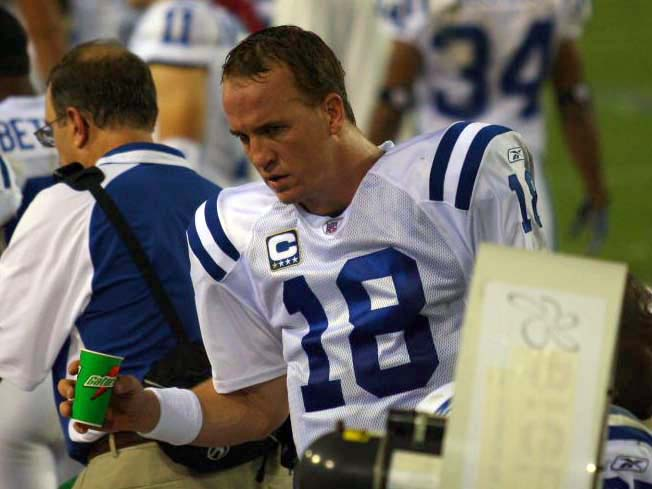
Peyton Manning won four MVP awards during his career with the Colts.

MVP	National Football League Most Valuable Player Award
SB MVP	Super Bowl Most Valuable Player Award
OPOY	National Football League Offensive Player of the Year Award
DPOY	National Football League Defensive Player of the Year Award
OROY	National Football League Offensive Rookie of the Year Award
DROY	National Football League Defensive Rookie of the Year Award
Pro Bowl MVP	National Football League Pro Bowl Most Valuable Player Award
CPOY	National Football League Comeback Player of the Year Award
COY	National Football League Coach of the Year Award
AFC Off. POY	AFC Offensive Player of the Year Award
AFC ROY	AFC Rookie of the Year Award
MOY	Walter Payton Man of the Year Award
NFL ROY	NFL Rookie of the Year Award

== Season records ==
NFL champions (1920–1969)^{§}	Super Bowl champions (1970–present)^{†}	Conference champions^{*}	Division champions^{^}	Wild card berth^{#}	One-game playoff berth^{+}

Season	Team	League	Conference	Division	Regular season^{[a]}				Postseason results	Awards^{[b]}^{[c]}	Head coach
Season	Team	League	Conference	Division	Finish	W	L	T	Postseason results	Awards^{[b]}^{[c]}	Head coach
Baltimore Colts
1953	1953	NFL	Western	—	5th	3	9	0			Keith Molesworth
1954	1954	NFL	Western	—	6th	3	9	0			Weeb Ewbank
1955	1955	NFL	Western	—	4th	5	6	1		Alan Ameche (OROY)	Weeb Ewbank
1956	1956	NFL	Western	—	4th	5	7	0		Lenny Moore (OROY)	Weeb Ewbank
1957	1957	NFL	Western	—	3rd	7	5	0			Weeb Ewbank
1958	1958	NFL^{§}	Western^{*}	—	1st^{*}	9	3	0	Won NFL Championship (1) (at Giants) 23–17^{[d]}	Weeb Ewbank (COY)	Weeb Ewbank
1959	1959	NFL^{§}	Western^{*}	—	1st^{*}	9	3	0	Won NFL Championship (2) (Giants) 31–16		Weeb Ewbank
1960	1960	NFL	Western	—	4th	6	6	0			Weeb Ewbank
1961	1961	NFL	Western	—	3rd	8	6	0			Weeb Ewbank
1962	1962	NFL	Western	—	4th	7	7	0			Weeb Ewbank
1963	1963	NFL	Western	—	3rd	8	6	0			Don Shula
1964	1964	NFL	Western^{*}	—	1st^{*}	12	2	0	Lost NFL Championship (at Browns) 0–27	Johnny Unitas (MVP); Don Shula (COY)	Don Shula
1965	1965	NFL	Western	—	2nd^{+}	10	3	1	Lost Conference Playoff (at Packers) 10–13		Don Shula
1966	1966	NFL	Western	—	2nd	9	5	0			Don Shula
1967^{[e]}	1967	NFL	Western	Coastal	2nd	11	1	2		Johnny Unitas (MVP); Don Shula (COY)	Don Shula
1968	1968	NFL^{§}	Western^{*}	Coastal^{^}	1st^{^}	13	1	0	Won Conference Playoffs (Vikings) 24–14; Won NFL Championship (at Browns) 34–0; Lost Super Bowl III (vs. Jets) 7–16	Earl Morrall (MVP); Don Shula (COY)	Don Shula
1969	1969	NFL	Western	Coastal	2nd	8	5	1			Don Shula
1970	1970	NFL^{†}	AFC^{*}	East^{^}	1st^{^}	11	2	1	Won Divisional Playoffs (Bengals) 17–0; Won AFC Championship (Raiders) 27–17; Won Super Bowl V (3) (vs. Cowboys) 16–13	Johnny Unitas (WP MOY)	Don McCafferty
1971	1971	NFL	AFC	East	2nd^{#}	10	4	0	Won Divisional Playoffs (at Browns) 20–3; Lost AFC Championship (at Dolphins) 0–21		Don McCafferty
1972	1972	NFL	AFC	East	3rd	5	9	0			Don McCafferty (1–4) John Sandusky (4–5)
1973	1973	NFL	AFC	East	5th	4	10	0			Howard Schnellenberger
1974	1974	NFL	AFC	East	5th	2	12	0			Howard Schnellenberger (0–3) Joe Thomas (2–9)
1975	1975	NFL	AFC	East^{^}	1st^{^}^{[f]}	10	4	0	Lost Divisional Playoffs (at Steelers) 10–28	Ted Marchibroda (COY)	Ted Marchibroda
1976	1976	NFL	AFC	East^{^}	1st^{^}^{[g]}	11	3	0	Lost Divisional Playoffs (Steelers) 14–40	Bert Jones (MVP, OPOY)	Ted Marchibroda
1977	1977	NFL	AFC	East^{^}	1st^{^}^{[h]}	10	4	0	Lost Divisional Playoffs (Raiders) 31–37 (2OT)^{[i]}		Ted Marchibroda
1978	1978	NFL	AFC	East	5th	5	11	0			Ted Marchibroda
1979	1979	NFL	AFC	East	5th	5	11	0			Ted Marchibroda
1980	1980	NFL	AFC	East	4th	7	9	0			Mike McCormack
1981	1981	NFL	AFC	East	4th	2	14	0			Mike McCormack
1982	1982	NFL	AFC	^{[j]}	14th	0	8	1			Frank Kush
1983	1983	NFL	AFC	East	4th	7	9	0		Vernon Leroy Maxwell (DROY)	Frank Kush
Indianapolis Colts
1984	1984	NFL	AFC	East	4th	4	12	0			Frank Kush (4–11) Hal Hunter (0–1)
1985	1985	NFL	AFC	East	4th	5	11	0		Duane Bickett (DROY)	Rod Dowhower
1986	1986	NFL	AFC	East	5th	3	13	0			Rod Dowhower (0–13) Ron Meyer (3–0)
1987	1987	NFL	AFC	East^{^}	1st^{^}^{[k]}	9	6	0	Lost Divisional Playoffs (at Browns) 21–38		Ron Meyer
1988	1988	NFL	AFC	East	3rd	9	7	0			Ron Meyer
1989	1989	NFL	AFC	East	3rd	8	8	0			Ron Meyer
1990	1990	NFL	AFC	East	3rd	7	9	0			Ron Meyer
1991	1991	NFL	AFC	East	5th	1	15	0			Ron Meyer (0–5) Rick Venturi (1–10)
1992	1992	NFL	AFC	East	3rd	9	7	0			Ted Marchibroda
1993	1993	NFL	AFC	East	5th	4	12	0			Ted Marchibroda
1994	1994	NFL	AFC	East	3rd	8	8	0		Marshall Faulk (OROY)	Ted Marchibroda
1995	1995	NFL	AFC	East	2nd^{#}	9	7	0	Won Wild Card Playoffs (at Chargers) 35–20; Won Divisional Playoffs (at Chiefs) 10–7; Lost AFC Championship (at Steelers) 16–20	Jim Harbaugh (CBPOY)	Ted Marchibroda
1996	1996	NFL	AFC	East	3rd^{#}	9	7	0	Lost Wild Card Playoffs (at Steelers) 14–42		Lindy Infante
1997	1997	NFL	AFC	East	5th	3	13	0			Lindy Infante
1998	1998	NFL	AFC	East	5th	3	13	0			Jim E. Mora
1999	1999	NFL	AFC	East^{^}	1st^{^}	13	3	0	Lost Divisional Playoffs (Titans) 16–19	Edgerrin James (OROY)	Jim E. Mora
2000	2000	NFL	AFC	East	2nd^{#}	10	6	0	Lost Wild Card Playoffs (at Dolphins) 17–23 (OT)		Jim E. Mora
2001	2001	NFL	AFC	East	4th	6	10	0			Jim E. Mora
2002	2002	NFL	AFC	South	2nd^{#}	10	6	0	Lost Wild Card Playoffs (at Jets) 0–41		Tony Dungy
2003	2003	NFL	AFC	South^{^}	1st^{^}	12	4	0	Won Wild Card Playoffs (Broncos) 41–10; Won Divisional Playoffs (at Chiefs) 38–31; Lost AFC Championship (at Patriots) 14–24	Peyton Manning (MVP)	Tony Dungy
2004	2004	NFL	AFC	South^{^}	1st^{^}	12	4	0	Won Wild Card Playoffs (Broncos) 49–24; Lost Divisional Playoffs (at Patriots) 3–20	Peyton Manning (MVP, OPOY)	Tony Dungy
2005	2005	NFL	AFC	South^{^}	1st^{^}	14	2	0	Lost Divisional Playoffs (Steelers) 18–21	Peyton Manning (WP MOY)	Tony Dungy
2006	2006	NFL^{†}	AFC^{*}	South^{^}	1st^{^}	12	4	0	Won Wild Card Playoffs (Chiefs) 23–8; Won Divisional Playoffs (at Ravens) 15–6; Won AFC Championship (Patriots) 38–34; Won Super Bowl XLI (4) (vs. Bears) 29–17	Peyton Manning (SB MVP)	Tony Dungy
2007	2007	NFL	AFC	South^{^}	1st^{^}	13	3	0	Lost Divisional Playoffs (Chargers) 24–28^{[l]}	Bob Sanders (DPOY)	Tony Dungy
2008	2008	NFL	AFC	South	2nd^{#}	12	4	0	Lost Wild Card Playoffs (at Chargers) 17–23 (OT)	Peyton Manning (MVP)	Tony Dungy
2009	2009	NFL	AFC^{*}	South^{^}	1st^{^}	14	2	0	Won Divisional Playoffs (Ravens) 20–3; Won AFC Championship (Jets) 30–17; Lost Super Bowl XLIV (vs. Saints) 17–31	Peyton Manning (MVP); Bill Polian (EOY)	Jim Caldwell
2010	2010	NFL	AFC	South^{^}	1st^{^}	10	6	0	Lost Wild Card Playoffs (Jets) 16–17		Jim Caldwell
2011	2011	NFL	AFC	South	4th	2	14	0			Jim Caldwell
2012	2012	NFL	AFC	South	2nd^{#}	11	5	0	Lost Wild Card Playoffs (at Ravens) 9–24	Bruce Arians (COY)^{[m]}	Chuck Pagano
2013	2013	NFL	AFC	South^{^}	1st^{^}	11	5	0	Won Wild Card Playoffs (Chiefs) 45–44; Lost Divisional Playoffs (at Patriots) 22–43		Chuck Pagano
2014	2014	NFL	AFC	South^{^}	1st^{^}	11	5	0	Won Wild Card Playoffs (Bengals) 26–10; Won Divisional Playoffs (at Broncos) 24–13; Lost AFC Championship (at Patriots) 7–45		Chuck Pagano
2015	2015	NFL	AFC	South	2nd	8	8	0			Chuck Pagano
2016	2016	NFL	AFC	South	3rd	8	8	0			Chuck Pagano
2017	2017	NFL	AFC	South	3rd	4	12	0			Chuck Pagano
2018	2018	NFL	AFC	South	2nd^{#}	10	6	0	Won Wild Card Playoffs (at Texans) 21–7; Lost Divisional Playoffs (at Chiefs) 13–31	Shaquille Leonard (DROY); Andrew Luck (CPOY)	Frank Reich
2019	2019	NFL	AFC	South	3rd	7	9	0			Frank Reich
2020	2020	NFL	AFC	South	2nd^{#}	11	5	0	Lost Wild Card Playoffs (at Bills) 24–27		Frank Reich
2021	2021	NFL	AFC	South	2nd	9	8	0			Frank Reich
2022	2022	NFL	AFC	South	3rd	4	12	1			Frank Reich (3–5–1) Jeff Saturday (1–7)
2023	2023	NFL	AFC	South	3rd	9	8	0			Shane Steichen
2024	2024	NFL	AFC	South	2nd	8	9	0			Shane Steichen
2025	2025	NFL	AFC	South	3rd	8	9	0			Shane Steichen

=== All-time records ===
Statistic	Wins	Losses	Ties	Win%
Baltimore Colts regular season record (1953–1983)	222	194	7	.533
Indianapolis Colts regular season record (1984–2025)	350	325	1	.518
All-time regular season record (1953–2025)	572	519	8	.524
Baltimore Colts post-season record (1953–1983)	8	7	—	.533
Indianapolis Colts post-season record (1984–2025)	15	18	—	.455
All-time post-season record (1953–2025)	23	25	—	.479
All-time regular and post-season record	595	544	8	.522

== Notes ==
- ^{a} The Finish, Won, Lost, and Ties columns list regular season results and exclude any postseason play. Regular season and postseason results are combined only at the bottom of the list.
- ^{b} All regular season MVPs listed are the Associated Press MVP. For the full list of other MVPs see National Football League Most Valuable Player Award.
- ^{c} All Coach of the Year Awards listed are the Associated Press award. For the full list of other coaching awards see National Football League Coach of the Year Award.
- ^{d} This game would be later known as The Greatest Game Ever Played.
- ^{e} The 1967 NFL season marks the first season in the league's history where the league was divided into two conferences which were subdivided into two divisions. Up to 1967, the league was either divided into two divisions, two conferences, or neither.
- ^{f} The Colts and Dolphins finished tied. However, the Colts finished ahead of Miami in the AFC East based on a head-to-head sweep (2–0).
- ^{g} The Colts and Patriots finished tied. However, the Colts finished ahead of New England based on a better division record (7–1 to Patriots' 6–2).
- ^{h} The Colts and Dolphins finished tied. However, the Colts finished ahead of Miami based on better conference record (9–3 to Dolphins' 8–4).
- ^{i} The game involved the infamous Ghost to the Post play.
- ^{j} 1982 was a strike-shortened season so the league was divided up into two conferences instead of its normal divisional alignment.
- ^{k} A 24-day players' strike reduced the 16-game season to 15, causing week 3 to be canceled.
- ^{l} This was the last game played in the RCA Dome.
- ^{m} Arians served as interim head coach for twelve games during the season due to Pagano's leukemia diagnosis, posting a 9–3 record en route to the AP NFL Coach of the Year award.
