= Tony Bertuca =

American football player (born 1950)

- Bertuca in 1975

No. 51
- Position: Linebacker

Personal information
- Born: January 4, 1950 (age 76); Chicago, Illinois, U.S.
- Listed height: 6 ft 2 in (1.88 m)
- Listed weight: 225 lb (102 kg)

Career information
- High school: St. Patrick (Chicago)
- College: Cal State-Chico
- NFL draft: 1971: undrafted

Career history
- Cincinnati Bengals (1971)*; Baltimore Colts (1974); Miami Dolphins (1977–1978)*
- * Offseason or practice squad member only

Career NFL statistics
- Games played: 14
- Starts: 0
- Stats at Pro Football Reference

Anthony Francis Bertuca (born January 4, 1950) is an American former professional football player who was a linebacker for one season with the Baltimore Colts of the National Football League (NFL). He played college football for the Montana Grizzlies and Chico State Wildcats.

== Early life and college ==
Tony Bertuca was born January 4, 1950, in Chicago, Illinois. He attended St. Patrick in that city.

Bertuca played college football at the University of Montana, Wenatchee Valley Junior College, and California State University, Chico. He also played college basketball for Chico State. He graduated from that school with a bachelor of arts degree in Physical Education in 1971.

== Professional career ==
Undrafted in the 1971 NFL draft, Bertuca attempted to make the Cincinnati Bengals as an undrafted free agent. Legendary head coach Paul Brown of the Bengals moved Bertuca from safety to linebacker in camp, telling him that he had NFL potential but lacked seasoning.

With his college football eligibility lapsed, Bertuca attempted to hone his football skills playing for the semi-professional Lake County Rifles of the Central State League, which he did for the 1972 and 1973 seasons. "We had to drive 700 miles to some games and play that same night," he recalled. "We practiced nights at a field that didn't have any lights, but by that time most of the guys were worn out from working all day on their regular jobs."

To pay the bills Bertuca worked as a bouncer in a bar owned by Chicago Bears linebacker Doug Buffone.

It was through the Lake County team that Bertuca received his key professional football break, when team booster Ray O'Brien, who had business connections with Chicagoland HVAC contractor Bob Irsay, owner of the Baltimore Colts recommended him as a pro prospect. Irsay passed on the information to Colts general manager Joe Thomas and an invitation to the team's 1974 training camp followed. Against all odds, the unheralded Bertuca made the team as an undrafted free agent.

Although ostensibly listed as a linebacker on the depth chart, the hard-hitting Bertuca was exclusively a special teams coverage player for Baltimore. He saw action in all 14 games of the 1974 season. After recording two quarterback sacks in preseason action, Baltimore head coach Howard Schnellenberger praised Bertuca effusively, declaring the upstart to be "a real dynamo."

"Tony is strong and reckless, the endearing trait a coach looks for in a special team player," Schnellenberger said. "His biggest asset is his overall speed."

He was also at the training camp of the Miami Dolphins in 1977 and 1978, but was unable to make the final roster for either of those clubs.
