= List of Indianapolis Colts head coaches =

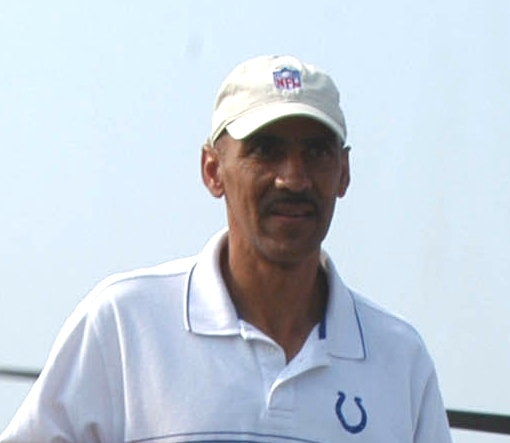
Tony Dungy is a former head coach of the Colts. He led them to their second Super Bowl victory in Miami (XLI).

The Indianapolis Colts are a professional American football team based in Indianapolis, Indiana. They are a member of the South Division of the American Football Conference (AFC) in the National Football League (NFL). In 1953, a Baltimore-based group led by Carroll Rosenbloom won the rights to a new Baltimore franchise. Rosenbloom was granted an NFL team, and was awarded the holdings of the defunct Dallas Texans organization. The team was known as the Baltimore Colts for 31 seasons before moving to Indianapolis in March 1984.

There have been 19 (Note: Although Bruce Arians was named as interim head coach during the 2012 season, he was not credited with the team's record while in charge.) head coaches for the Colts franchise. Keith Molesworth became the first coach of the Baltimore Colts in 1953, but he was reassigned to a different position with the team following the season. In terms of tenure, Weeb Ewbank has led the team for more games (112) and more complete seasons (nine) than any other head coach. He led the team to two of their NFL championships. Four Colts head coaches; Ewbank, Don Shula (3), Ted Marchibroda, and Tony Dungy have been named coach of the year by at least one major news organization. Ewbank, Shula, and Dungy are members of the Pro Football Hall of Fame, having been inducted in 1978, 1997, and 2016 respectively.

Six times in Colts history there were interim head coaches. In 1972, Don McCafferty was fired five games into the season. John Sandusky was named as the interim head coach for the rest of the season, during which he led the Colts to a 4–5 record, but he was not made the permanent coach the next year. In 1974, head coach Howard Schnellenberger started off the season 0–3 and was fired. Joe Thomas assumed the duties of head coach and finished the season at 2–12. In 1991, the Colts started off 0–5 and Ron Meyer was fired as head coach. Rick Venturi was named as the interim for the final 11 games. In 2005 Tony Dungy was forced to miss one game due to personal issues. Jim Caldwell was named as the one game interim. In 2012 offensive coordinator Bruce Arians was named as the interim head coach indefinitely after Chuck Pagano was diagnosed with leukemia four weeks into the 2012 NFL season. Arians led the Colts to a 9–3 record – the record being credited to Pagano – and made the playoffs. Following a 3–5–1 start, Frank Reich was fired and on November 7, 2022, the Indianapolis Colts named Jeff Saturday as the team's interim coach for the rest of the season, during which he led the Colts to a 1–7 record. He was not made the permanent coach the next year.

== Key ==
#	Number of coaches
GC	Games coached
W	Wins
L	Losses
T	Ties
Win%	Winning percentage
*	Elected to the Pro Football Hall of Fame
^	Elected into the Pro Football Hall of Fame as a player
†	Spent entire professional NFL head coaching career with the Colts

== Coaches ==
Note: Statistics are accurate through the end of the 2025 NFL season.

#	Image	Name	Term	Regular season					Playoffs			Awards	Reference
#	Image	Name	Term	GC	W	L	T	Win%	GC	W	L	Awards	Reference
Baltimore Colts
1		Keith Molesworth†	1953	12	3	9	0	.333	–	–	–		
2		Weeb Ewbank*	1954–1962	112	59	52	1	.527	2	2	0	AP NFL Coach of the Year (1958); UPI NFL Coach of the Year (1958)	
3		Don Shula*	1963–1969	98	71	23	4	.725	5	2	3	AP NFL Coach of the Year (1964, 1967, 1968); Sporting News NFL Coach of the Year (1964, 1968); Pro Football Weekly NFL Coach of the Year (1968)	
4		Don McCafferty	1970–1972	33	22	10	1	.667	5	4	1		
5		John Sandusky†	1972 (Note: John Sandusky was the interim head coach for nine games during the 1972 season.)	9	4	5	0	.444	–	–	–		
6		Howard Schnellenberger†	1973–1974	17	4	13	0	.235	–	–	–		
7		Joe Thomas†	1974 (Note: Joe Thomas was the interim head coach for 11 games during the 1974 season.)	11	2	9	0	.182	–	–	–		
8		Ted Marchibroda	1975–1979	74	41	33	0	.554	3	0	3	AP NFL Coach of the Year (1975); Sporting News NFL Coach of the Year (1975); Pro Football Weekly NFL Coach of the Year (1975); UPI NFL Coach of the Year (1975)	
9		Mike McCormack^	1980–1981	32	9	23	0	.281	–	–	–		
10		Frank Kush†	1982–1983	25	7	17	1	.300	–	–	–		
Indianapolis Colts
–		Frank Kush†	1984	15	4	11	0	.267	–	–	–		
11		Hal Hunter†	1984 (Note: Hal Hunter was the interim head coach for the final game of the 1984 season.)	1	0	1	0	.000	–	–	–		
12		Rod Dowhower†	1985–1986	29	5	24	0	.172	–	–	–		
13		Ron Meyer	1986–1991 (Note: Ron Meyer was the interim head coach for three games during the 1986 season.)	71	36	35	0	.507	2	0	2	UPI NFL Coach of the Year (1987)	
14		Rick Venturi	1991 (Note: Rick Venturi was the interim head coach for 11 games during the 1991 season.)	11	1	10	0	.100	–	–	–		
–		Ted Marchibroda	1992–1995	64	30	34	0	.469	3	2	1		
15		Lindy Infante	1996–1997	32	12	20	0	.375	1	0	1		
16		Jim Mora	1998–2001	64	32	32	0	.500	2	0	2		
17		Tony Dungy*	2002–2008	112	85	27	0	.759	13	7	6	Sporting News NFL Coach of the Year (2005); Maxwell Football Club NFL Coach of the Year (2005)	
18		Jim Caldwell	2009–2011	48	26	22	0	.542	4	2	2		
19		Chuck Pagano†	2012–2017 (Note: During the 2012 season, Chuck Pagano was diagnosed with leukemia. Bruce Arians was the interim head coach for 12 games, while Pagano underwent treatment. Arians led the team to a 9–3 record and won the AP NFL Coach of the Year for 2012. However, the record was credited to Pagano.)	96	53	43	0	.552	6	3	3		
20		Frank Reich	2018–2022 (Note: Originally, Indianapolis intended to hire Josh McDaniels as their head coach for the 2018 season. Though the Colts and McDaniels had verbally agreed to terms for a contract, McDaniels backed out of the agreement a day before his official introduction as head coach to return to his position as offensive coordinator of the New England Patriots. As such, Frank Reich was hired instead.)	74	40	33	1	.547	3	1	2		
21	Jeff Saturday 2022 (cropped)	Jeff Saturday†	2022 (Note: Jeff Saturday was the interim head coach for eight games during the 2022 season.)	8	1	7	0	.125	–	–	–		
22		Shane Steichen†	2023–present	51	25	26	0	.490	–	–	–		
