= Ron Fernandes =

American football player (1951–2023)

- Fernandes in 1977

No. 79, 73, 74
- Position: Defensive lineman

Personal information
- Born: September 11, 1951; Ypsilanti, Michigan, U.S.
- Died: December 5, 2023 (aged 72)
- Listed height: 6 ft 4 in (1.93 m)
- Listed weight: 251 lb (114 kg)

Career information
- High school: Ypsilanti
- College: Eastern Michigan
- NFL draft: 1973: 10th round, 260th overall pick

Career history
- Miami Dolphins (1973)*; New England Patriots (1973)*; Detroit Wheels (1974); Baltimore Colts (1976–1980); Washington Federals (1983)
- * Offseason or practice squad member only

Career NFL statistics
- Games played: 40
- Starts: 14
- Sacks: 10.5
- Safeties: 1
- Stats at Pro Football Reference

Ronald Michael Fernandes (September 11, 1951 – December 5, 2023) was a professional football player who was a defensive lineman for three seasons with the Baltimore Colts of the National Football League (NFL).

== Early life ==
Ron Fernandes was born September 11, 1951, in Ypsilanti, Michigan. His family moved to Rocky River, Ohio, where he attended Rocky River High School, earning athletic letters in baseball and football. He returned to Ypsilanti in the middle of his high school years, attending Ypsilanti High School where he earned additional letters in wrestling and football.

== Football career ==
He played college football for the Eastern Michigan Eagles and was selected 260th overall by the Miami Dolphins in the tenth round of the 1973 NFL draft. Fernandes was released by the Dolphins ahead of the 1973 NFL season and signed on with the New England Patriots, only to be cut once again before the season began. He was resigned by the Patriots during the season and was on the team's roster for the last 5 games of the year without seeing game action.

In 1974, Fernandes signed with the Detroit Wheels of the World Football League (WFL). At the end of the 1974 World Football League season it appeared that Fernandes' career as a professional football player was over, returning to work as a part-time member of the coaching staff at his alma mater.

He made a surprising comeback in 1976, winning a spot on the 43-man roster of the Baltimore Colts, registering five quarterback sacks — one of which was a safety — as a reserve defensive end. He came off the bench for the Colts in 13 games during the year.

Fernandes saw action in all 14 of the Colts' games during the 1977 season, cracking the starting lineup as right defensive tackle for 7 games in the aftermath of an injury to regular Joe Ehrmann. Fernandes found the switch of line positions from his natural position of defensive end to be difficult, telling the Baltimore Sun, "It's a completely different game than at end. You're still three feet apart [from the opponent], but it's a totally different world the way the offensive lineman blocks you. They can hit a tackle any way they want to, from any angle."

Unfortunately for Fernandes, a knee injury knocked him out of action ahead of the 1978 campaign, and he lost the entire year to injury.

A comeback was made for the 1979 Colts season, this time shifting positions to right defensive end, where he replaced disgruntled All-Pro John Dutton, who refused to return to the team owing to a bitter contract holdout poisoned by comments made by pugilistic owner Bob Irsay. Fernandes started 7 games and appeared in 13 during the year, with Dutton dealt away by the Colts to the Dallas Cowboys.

He spent the 1980 season on injured reserve and was released by the Colts in August 1981.

Fernandes played in three games, starting one, for the Washington Federals of the United States Football League in 1983.

== Later life ==
After his time in professional football came to an end he returned home to Michigan. He married his long time love, Brenda Reed, and had two daughters.

Fernandes died on December 5, 2023, at the age of 72.
