= Joe Thomas (American football executive) =

American football executive (1921–1983)

- Thomas, circa 1973

Personal information
- Born: March 18, 1921; Warren, Ohio, U.S.
- Died: February 10, 1983 (aged 61); Miami, Florida, U.S.

Career information
- College: Ohio Northern

Career history

Coaching
- Baltimore Colts (D-line) (1954); Baltimore Colts (Head coach) (1974)

Operations
- Minnesota Vikings (1960–1965) Director of player personnel; Miami Dolphins (1966–1971) Director of player personnel; Baltimore Colts (1972–1976) General manager; San Francisco 49ers (1977–1978) General manager; Miami Dolphins (1979–1982) Vice president

Career statistics
- Win–loss record: 2–9
- Winning %: .182
- Coaching profile at Pro Football Reference

Joseph Henry Thomas (March 18, 1921 – February 10, 1983) was a National Football League (NFL) general manager and also served as the head coach of the Baltimore Colts for part of the 1974 season.

== Biography ==
=== Early life ===
Joe Thomas was born March 18, 1921, and grew up in Cortland, Ohio.

He attended Ohio Northern University in Ada, Ohio, from which he received a Bachelor of Science degree. He was a two sport athlete at Ohio Northern, playing basketball and end on the football team.

During World War II, Thomas was a member of the United States Navy, playing service football at the Bainbridge Naval Training Center in 1943 and later at Great Lakes Naval Training Station. While playing for the Great Lakes Navy Bluejackets, Thomas played for legendary coach Paul Brown and his assistant Weeb Ewbank, becoming a protege of the latter.

After the war, Thomas began a coaching career at the high school level, leading teams at New Albany and Rensselaer high schools in Indiana.

Thomas then took a position as a line coach at DePauw University, where he remained for four years. Throughout his time as a college coach, Thomas stayed in touch with professional coaches Brown and Ewbank as a participant for six years in off-season football clinics organized by the Cleveland Browns.

He then enrolled at Indiana University from which he received a Master's degree in Physical Education, also working as an assistant coach on the staff of head coach Bernie Crimmins during this period. He also served as an assistant basketball coach on the staff of Branch McCracken for Indiana's 1952–53 NCAA championship season.

=== NFL and CFL assistant coach ===
When Weeb Ewbank was named head coach of the Baltimore Colts in 1954, he was quick to name Thomas to his staff as defensive line coach. Thomas would remain in Baltimore one year before moving on to other positions with the Los Angeles Rams of the NFL and the Toronto Argonauts of the Canadian Football League.

=== Football executive positions ===
Thomas was the first person hired by the NFL expansion Minnesota Vikings in 1960, building the team from the ground up.

In the summer of 1965, Thomas again became the first person hired by a professional football expansion franchise, this time the Miami Dolphins, assuming the role of player personnel director. Within six seasons, Thomas had assembled a team which won an American Football Conference title and advanced all the way to Super Bowl VI.

Following the Dolphins' loss to the Dallas Cowboys in the Super Bowl, Thomas became embroiled in a contract dispute with team owner Joe Robbie, culminating with Thomas' resignation on February 22, 1972. He was succeeded by Bobby Beathard three days later. Miami would win the next two Super Bowls with rosters largely assembled by Thomas.

=== Baltimore Colts GM ===
Thomas arranged for Robert Irsay to purchase the Los Angeles Rams from the estate of Dan Reeves for $19 million before exchanging them for Carroll Rosenbloom's Baltimore Colts in an unprecedented transaction which was completed on July 13, 1972. He became general manager of the Colts, succeeding Don Klosterman, who transitioned to the Rams in a similar capacity.

When the ballclub opened 1972 at 1–4, he fired head coach Don McCafferty on October 16 and replaced him with defensive line coach John Sandusky who was ordered by Thomas to start younger players over the veterans. The result was Johnny Unitas being benched for the remainder of the season in favor of Marty Domres. After the 5–9 Colts finished its first losing campaign in sixteen years, he dismissed Sandusky and his entire coaching staff on December 20.

He was reunited with Dolphins offensive coordinator Howard Schnellenberger who was named as Sandusky's successor eight weeks later on February 14, 1973. When the Colts went 4–13 over parts of two seasons with Schnellenberger at the helm, Thomas was named to replace him by Irsay following a 30–10 loss to the Philadelphia Eagles at Veterans Stadium on September 29, 1974. Irsay had first gone to the press box to inform Thomas that he was the new head coach and then to the locker room to announce his actions to the Colts players before breaking the news to Schnellenberger in a heated discussion in the coaches office.

Weeks prior to hiring Schnellenberger, Thomas purged the team of its veteran players, beginning with trading Unitas to the San Diego Chargers on January 22, 1973. Within the next ten days, Tom Matte would follow Unitas to San Diego, Bill Curry was sent to the Houston Oilers, Billy Newsome to the New Orleans Saints, Norm Bulaich to the Philadelphia Eagles and Jerry Logan to the Rams. The Newsome deal brought to the Colts the second overall selection in the 1973 NFL draft which was used to pick Bert Jones. In that draft and the one the following year, Thomas would also select a pair of blind-side offensive linemen in David Taylor and Robert Pratt and an entire defensive line of Joe Ehrmann, Mike Barnes, John Dutton and Fred Cook.

After the Colts qualified for the NFL playoffs by winning the AFC East title in each of two consecutive seasons in 1975 and 1976, Thomas lost a power struggle over player personnel decisions to head coach Ted Marchibroda and was fired by Irsay on January 21, 1977. The Colts had five different head coaches during Thomas' five-year tenure, one of whom was himself.

=== San Francisco 49ers GM ===
Thomas then was hired as GM of the San Francisco 49ers in 1977 by new owner Eddie DeBartolo at the recommendation of Al Davis and immediately fired head coach Monte Clark. The 49ers went 7–23 in his two seasons leading the franchise and his biggest trade, the surrender of five high draft picks for declining 31-year old halfback O. J. Simpson, proved to be a disaster. He also fired two more head coaches, Ken Meyer and Pete McCulley (and made 14 total roster changes). Thomas and his third 49ers head coach Fred O'Connor were dismissed on January 8, 1979, one day prior to Bill Walsh succeeding the latter.

According to longtime 49ers beat reporter Matt Maiocco, Thomas' attempt to annihilate the past and remake the 49ers in his own image included the destruction of historical memorabilia, with old photos, programs, and other artifacts disposed of en masse in a dumpster behind the team's Redwood City practice facility. Maiocco characterized this historical vandalism as "lasting harm" done to the organization that was "far worse than anything that shows up in the standings."

== Head coaching record ==
Team	Year	Regular season					Postseason
Team	Year	Won	Lost	Ties	Win %	Finish	Result
BAL	1974	2	9	0	.222	5th in AFC East	Missed playoffs
Total		2	9	0	.222		

== Personal life ==
Thomas married the former Judi Demian in 1969. They had a daughter, Paige, in June 1970.

Thomas died on February 10, 1983, at the age of 61. He was living in Miami and was VP of the Miami Dolphins at the time of his death.
