= Ted Marchibroda =

American football player and coach (1931–2016)

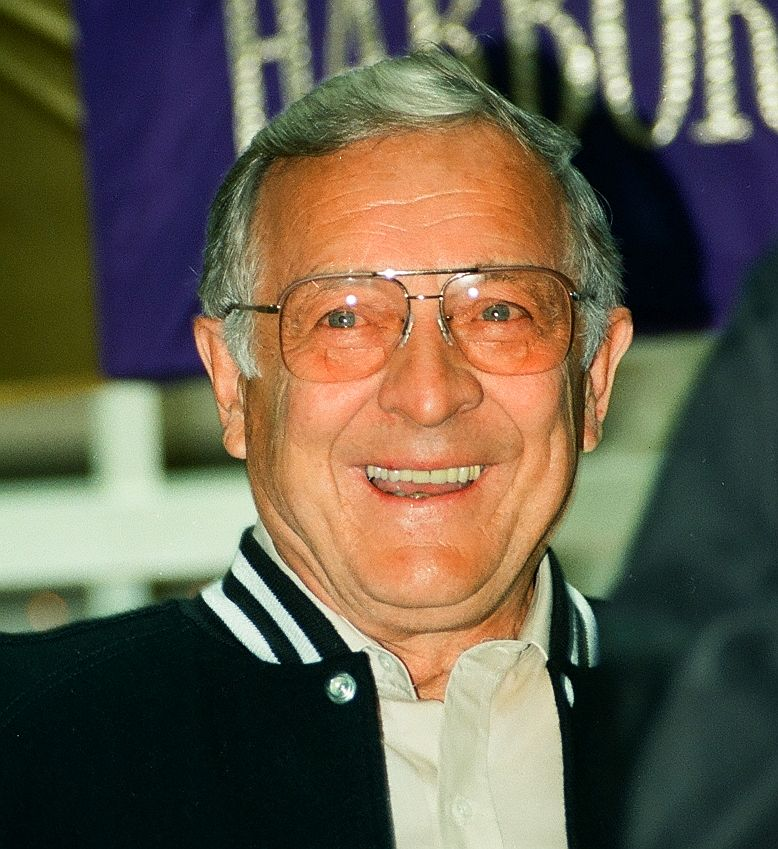
- Marchibroda in 1996

No. 14, 17, 18, 7
- Position: Quarterback

Personal information
- Born: March 15, 1931; Franklin, Pennsylvania, U.S.
- Died: January 16, 2016 (aged 84); Weems, Virginia, U.S.
- Listed height: 5 ft 10 in (1.78 m)
- Listed weight: 178 lb (81 kg)

Career information
- College: St. Bonaventure (1950–1951); Detroit (1952)
- NFL draft: 1953: 1st round, 5th overall pick

Career history

Playing
- Pittsburgh Steelers (1953, 1955–1956); Chicago Cardinals (1957)

Coaching
- Washington Redskins (1961–1965) Assistant coach; Los Angeles Rams (1966–1970) Assistant coach; Washington Redskins (1971–1974) Offensive coordinator; Baltimore Colts (1975–1979) Head coach; Chicago Bears (1981) Quarterbacks coach; Detroit Lions (1982–1983) Offensive coordinator; Philadelphia Eagles (1984–1985) Offensive coordinator; Buffalo Bills (1987–1991); Quarterbacks coach (1987–1988); Offensive coordinator (1989–1991); Indianapolis Colts (1992–1995) Head coach; Baltimore Ravens (1996–1998) Head coach

Awards and highlights
- NFL Coach of the Year (1975); Indianapolis Colts Ring of Honor (2002)

Career NFL statistics
- Passing attempts: 385
- Passing completions: 172
- Completion percentage: 44.7%
- TD–INT: 16–29
- Passing yards: 2,169
- Passer rating: 45.3
- Stats at Pro Football Reference

Head coaching record
- Regular season: 87–98–1 (.470)
- Postseason: 2–4 (.333)
- Career: 89–102–1 (.466)
- Coaching profile at Pro Football Reference

Theodore Joseph Marchibroda (March 15, 1931 – January 16, 2016) was an American professional football player and coach in the National Football League (NFL). He played four years in the NFL as a quarterback with the Pittsburgh Steelers (1953, 1955–1956) and Chicago Cardinals (1957). Marchibroda was later head coach of the Colts in two different cities and decades, first in Baltimore from 1975 to 1979 and then Indianapolis from 1992 to 1995. Upon joining the Baltimore Ravens in 1996, he became the only individual to serve as head coach with both of Baltimore's NFL teams and gained the unusual distinction of having three stints as an NFL head coach for two franchises in two cities, but with no two of those tenures being for the same franchise in the same city. His career NFL head coaching record was 87–98–1 (.470) and 2–4 in the playoffs.

== Early life ==
Ted Marchibroda was born on March 15, 1931, in Franklin, Pennsylvania. He attended Franklin High School, where he played football, basketball, and golf. Marchibroda was a gifted quarterback in football, playing four years of varsity. As a senior he earned Northwest Pennsylvania All-Star honors. In basketball, Marchibroda played three years of varsity and was named to the Pennsylvania All-State Team as a senior. In 1949, he was noted by an Erie, Pennsylvania sportswriter as "one of the greatest all-around athletes in Northwestern Pennsylvania history."

== Playing career ==
=== College career ===
Marchibroda began his college football career at Saint Bonaventure University, where he played quarterback from 1950 to 1951. In 1950, Marchibroda led St. Bonaventure to a 7–2 record and finished third in the small college standings with 95 completions on the season. In 1951, Marchibroda and St. Bonaventure went 5–4, but he continued to rank high in the collegiate passing statistics with 72 completions on 170 attempts for 1,146 yards. A notable matchup that season came when Marchibroda led St. Bonaventure to a 22–21 victory over the University of Louisville, whose freshman quarterback Johnny Unitas was making his collegiate debut.

Following the 1951 season, St. Bonaventure suspended its football team. Marchibroda left the school and joined the University of Detroit (now University of Detroit Mercy) for the 1952 football season. At Detroit, Marchibroda continued to excel at quarterback. Despite the team going 3–6 during his lone year in Detroit, Marchibroda gained national acclaim for his play. In a late season loss to Tulsa, Marchibroda set a then-collegiate record with 390 passing yards. Marchibroda led college players in total offense for the 1952 season with 1,813 yards.

Marchibroda served as the starting quarterback for the North team in the 1952 Blue–Gray Football Classic. Although his squad lost to the South 28–7, Marchibroda was named the North's outstanding player of the game.

=== Professional career ===
Marchibroda was selected in the first round of the 1953 NFL draft by his hometown Pittsburgh Steelers as the fifth overall pick and the first quarterback selected. Marchibroda was reunited with Steelers head coach Joe Bach, who previously coached him at St. Bonaventure. Marchibroda backed up quarterbacks Jim Finks and Bill Mackrides during the 1953 season, only appearing in four games.

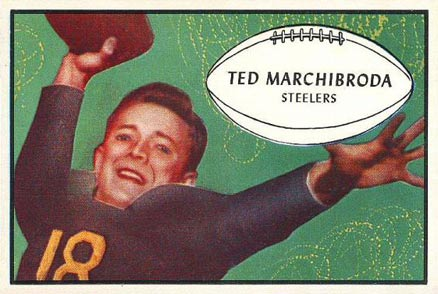
1953 Bowman football card

Marchibroda missed the 1954 season while serving in the U.S. Army and returned to the Steelers after his discharge in 1955. He again served as a backup quarterback, with seven appearances and two touchdown passes on the season. In 1956, Finks departed the Steelers, leaving Marchibroda as the starting quarterback. In his only NFL starting season, Marchibroda compiled a 4–7 record with 124 completions on 275 attempts for 1,585 passing yards and 12 touchdowns. He also rushed 39 times that season for 152 yards and two rushing touchdowns.

Marchibroda finished his professional playing career with the Chicago Cardinals in 1957, again serving as a backup. In 23 career NFL appearances, Marchibroda had 174 completions on 385 pass attempts for 2,169 yards, 16 touchdowns, and 29 interceptions.

== Coaching career ==
Marchibroda began his coaching career in 1961 as an assistant for the Washington Redskins under Bill McPeak before joining the Los Angeles Rams in 1966 under first-year head coach George Allen. He went with Allen to the Redskins in 1971 and was the offensive coordinator.

Marchibroda's first head coaching appointment was with the Baltimore Colts beginning on January 15, 1975. Inheriting a 2–12 ballclub that was one of the two worst in the NFL in 1974, he led one of the two biggest turnarounds in pro football history when the Colts ended the 1975 regular season at 10–4 and qualified for the playoffs by winning the AFC East title for the first of three consecutive years. All three postseason appearances ended in divisional round losses, first to the Steelers in both 1975 and 1976, and then to the Oakland Raiders in 1977.

His time with the Baltimore Colts nearly lasted only a season when he resigned on September 5, 1976, in response to team owner Robert Irsay verbally abusing his players after a loss in the final preseason match to the Detroit Lions at the Pontiac Silverdome three nights earlier on September 2. Marchibroda was also at odds with general manager Joe Thomas over player personnel decisions. He was rehired two days later on September 7 after offensive and defensive coordinators Whitey Dovell and Maxie Baughan threatened to quit and the players considered boycotting practice, all in support of Marchibroda.

His five years as Colts head coach concluded with a pair of 5–11 last-place finishes in 1978 and 1979. The team was crippled by Irsay's acrimonious contract disputes with Lydell Mitchell and John Dutton which resulted in the players being traded to the San Diego Chargers and Dallas Cowboys respectively, Bert Jones' shoulder injuries that limited him to only seven games within those last two seasons, and three years of questionable drafts. Marchibroda was relieved of his duties on December 27, 1979, and succeeded by Mike McCormack on January 17, 1980.

After a one-year hiatus, he served as quarterbacks coach for the Chicago Bears in 1981, offensive coordinator for the Detroit Lions in 1982 and 1983, and the same role with the Philadelphia Eagles in 1984 and 1985.

Marchibroda served as the quarterbacks coach and later offensive coordinator of the Buffalo Bills under head coach Marv Levy from 1987 to 1991. As offensive coordinator for the Bills, he was influential in the evolution of the hurry-up offense. Levy, Marchibroda, and quarterback Jim Kelly used their version of the hurry-up offense, the "K-Gun" offense, more than any previous NFL team. Kelly would hurry to the line of scrimmage, preventing the defense from making substitutions, and called audibles at the line. The NFL later imposed a rule that allowed time for defense substitutions if the offense made substitutions, except after the two-minute warning of either half.

Marchibroda returned to the Colts, now based in Indianapolis, for a second stint as head coach on January 28, 1992. Similar to his first time with the franchise, the Colts had ended the previous campaign at 1–15, fired Ron Meyer after five winless games and replaced him with Rick Venturi on an interim basis. Marchibroda led the Colts to a 9–7 record in 1992. Three seasons later, the Colts made the playoffs for only the second time since moving to Indianapolis, and the first time in a non-strike year since 1977, when the team was still in Baltimore. A Cinderella run to the playoffs ended a big play short of Super Bowl XXX when the Colts lost the 1995 AFC Championship Game to the Steelers. Despite this, Marchibroda parted ways with the Colts on February 9, 1996, after his demand for a contract extension of two years rather than one was rejected. Offensive coordinator Lindy Infante was promoted to succeed him on February 15.

Marchibroda's unemployment lasted only six days when he returned to Baltimore on February 15, 1996, as the first-ever head coach of a yet-to-be-named professional football team in Baltimore, which subsequently became the Baltimore Ravens. After three losing seasons in which the Ravens went 16–31–1, Marchibroda was notified that he was not going to be retained on December 28, 1998. Brian Billick was named to succeed him just over three weeks later on January 20, 1999.

== Broadcasting career ==
After leaving coaching, Marchibroda served alongside Bob Lamey as a radio color commentator for the Indianapolis Colts from 1999 to 2006.

== Death ==
Marchibroda died on January 16, 2016, from natural causes at his home in Weems, Virginia, at the age of 84. He was survived by his wife Ann, their four children, and six grandchildren.

== Accolades ==
- Marchibroda was named NFL Coach of the Year for 1975 by the Associated Press, Sporting News, and Pro Football Weekly; he was named AFC Coach of the Year by United Press International.
- Marchibroda is a member of the Indianapolis Colts Ring of Honor (2002).
- Marchibroda is a member of the University of Detroit Sports Hall of Fame (Class of 1983).
- Marchibroda is a member of the St. Bonaventure University Athletics Hall of Fame (Class of 1970).
- Marchibroda was inducted into the National Polish-American Sports Hall of Fame in 1976.

== Head coaching record ==
=== NFL ===
Team	Year	Regular season					Postseason			
Team	Year	Won	Lost	Ties	Win %	Finish	Won	Lost	Win %	Result
BAL	1975	10	4	0	.714	1st in AFC East	0	1	.000	Lost to Pittsburgh Steelers in AFC Divisional Game.
BAL	1976	11	3	0	.786	1st in AFC East	0	1	.000	Lost to Pittsburgh Steelers in AFC Divisional Game.
BAL	1977	10	4	0	.714	1st in AFC East	0	1	.000	Lost to Oakland Raiders in AFC Divisional Game.
BAL	1978	5	11	0	.313	5th in AFC East	–	–	–	–
BAL	1979	5	11	0	.313	5th in AFC East	–	–	–	–
IND	1992	9	7	0	.563	3rd in AFC East	–	–	–	–
IND	1993	4	12	0	.250	5th in AFC East	–	–	–	–
IND	1994	8	8	0	.500	3rd in AFC East	–	–	–	–
IND	1995	9	7	0	.563	2nd in AFC East	2	1	.667	Lost to Pittsburgh Steelers in AFC Championship Game.
BAL/IND total		71	67	0	.514		2	4	.333	–
BAL	1996	4	12	0	.250	5th in AFC Central	–	–	–	–
BAL	1997	6	9	1	.406	5th in AFC Central	–	–	–	–
BAL	1998	6	10	0	.375	4th in AFC Central	–	–	–	–
BAL total		16	31	1	.344		–	–	–	–
Total		87	98	1	.470		2	4	.333	–

== Coaching tree ==
NFL head coaches under whom Ted Marchibroda served:

- Bill McPeak: Washington Redskins (1961–1965)
- George Allen: Los Angeles Rams (1966–1970), Washington Redskins (1971–1974)
- Neill Armstrong: Chicago Bears (1981)
- Monte Clark: Detroit Lions (1982–1983)
- Marion Campbell: Philadelphia Eagles (1984–1985)
- Marv Levy: Buffalo Bills (1987–1991)

Assistant coaches under Ted Marchibroda who became NFL or college head coaches:

- Bill Belichick: Cleveland Browns (1991–1995), New England Patriots (2000–2023)
- Kirk Ferentz: Iowa (1999–present)
- Pat Hill: Fresno State (1997–2011)
- Lindy Infante: Green Bay Packers (1988–1991), Indianapolis Colts (1996–1997)
- Marvin Lewis: Cincinnati Bengals (2003–2018)
- Eric Mangini: New York Jets (2006–2008), Cleveland Browns (2009–2010)
- Jim Schwartz: Detroit Lions (2009–2013)
- Vince Tobin: Arizona Cardinals (1996–2000)
- Ken Whisenhunt: Arizona Cardinals (2007–2012), Tennessee Titans (2014–2015)

== See also ==
- List of NCAA major college football yearly total offense leaders
