= Randy Hall (American football) =

American football player (born 1952)

- Hall in 1977

No. 33
- Position: Safety

Personal information
- Born: February 8, 1952 (age 74); Coulee Dam, Washington, U.S.
- Listed height: 6 ft 3 in (1.91 m)
- Listed weight: 185 lb (84 kg)

Career information
- High school: Eastmont (East Wenatchee, Washington)
- College: Idaho (1970–1973)
- NFL draft: 1974: 13th round, 317th overall pick

Career history
- Baltimore Colts (1974–1976); Saskatchewan Roughriders (1978)

Career NFL statistics
- Games played: 27
- Games started: 0
- Stats at Pro Football Reference

Randy Lee Hall (born February 8, 1952) is an American former professional football player who was a defensive back in the National Football League (NFL). He played college football for the University of Idaho.

== Biography ==
Hall was born February 8, 1952, in Coulee Dam, Washington. He attended Eastmont High School in East Wenatchee, Washington.

Hall attended the University of Idaho in Moscow, Idaho, where he was originally offered a scholarship as a basketball player. He switched his attention to football after one year, eventually earning All-Big Sky Conference honors in 1972 and 1973 as a cornerback. Hall was also highly regarded as a baseball player, attending camp with the Kansas City Royals before calling it quits after sustaining a broken nose.

Hall missed the entire 1975 season with a foot injury.

Hall was drafted by the Baltimore Colts of the National Football League in the 1974 NFL draft, with the Colts selecting him in the 13th round, making him the 317th selection of the draft. He possessed what was regarded as excellent speed, having been timed at 9.8 seconds in the 100 yard dash and 4.6 seconds running the 40. He appeared in all 14 games in the 1974 season, playing mostly on special teams.

Hall missed the entire 1975 season due to a foot injury sustained in training camp, spending his time that year as a part-time assistant coach at Eastern Michigan. Hall returned to the Colts for the 1976 season, having been converted by the team from his college position of cornerback to free safety. He saw 13 games during that year, again spending most of his time as a member of the special teams.

A contract was signed in May 1977 and Hall again attempted to land a spot on the Colts' roster. He missed some time with a groin injury, however, and was released by the Colts during the final pruning of the roster down to the 48-man limit ahead of the 1977 season.

During his time with the Colts, Hall and his wife made their home in rural Genesee, Idaho.
