= 2007 New Orleans Bowl =

2007 R+L Carriers New Orleans Bowl
Memphis Tigers	Florida Atlantic Owls
(7–5)	(7–5)
C-USA	Sun Belt
27	44
Head coach: Tommy West	Head coach: Howard Schnellenberger
	1	2	3	4	Total
Memphis	7	13	7	0	27
Florida Atlantic	17	13	7	7	44
- Date: December 21, 2007
- Season: 2007
- Stadium: Louisiana Superdome
- Location: New Orleans, Louisiana
- MVP: FAU QB Rusty Smith
- Favorite: Memphis by 2½
- Referee: Dan Capron (Big Ten)
- Attendance: 25,146
- Payout: US$325,000 per team

United States TV coverage
- Network: ESPN2
- Announcers: Mark Jones, Bob Davie, and Stacey Dales

The 2007 R+L Carriers New Orleans Bowl was a post-season American college football bowl game. Part of the 2007-08 NCAA football bowl games season, it was played on December 21, 2007, at the Louisiana Superdome in New Orleans, Louisiana.

The Memphis Tigers of Conference USA, faced the Florida Atlantic Owls, winners of the Sun Belt Conference title for the first time in school history. Both teams had a regular-season record of 7–5.

The game was Memphis's third bowl game in four years. The Tigers' season was marked by the murder of defensive end Taylor Bradford on September 30, but the team carried on to a winning record and its first bowl appearance since the 2005 Motor City Bowl. The Owls have only played college football since 2001, and this game was their first bowl appearance. The seven years between the creation of the FAU college football team and this bowl appearance marked the quickest a team had ever appeared in a bowl game after its establishment. Florida Atlantic led the NCAA in turnover margin. FAU head coach Howard Schnellenberger led the Miami Hurricanes to a National Championship in 1983. At the time of the 2007 New Orleans Bowl, Schnellenberger was the third-oldest head coach in Division I football.

== Game summary ==
The 2007 New Orleans Bowl kicked off at 8:00 p.m. EST at the Louisiana Superdome in New Orleans, Louisiana. The game was broadcast nationally in the United States on ESPN2.

=== First Quarter ===
Florida Atlantic received the ball to begin the game. On the opening kickoff, the Owls managed an excellent kick return that placed the ball on their own 48-yard line. FAU used the field position to their advantage, and entered Memphis territory on the first play of the game from scrimmage. In just five plays, Florida Atlantic penetrated the Memphis red zone, and two more plays set up the Owls inside the Memphis five-yard line. With 12:03 remaining in the first quarter, FAU quarterback Rusty Smith connected on a four-yard touchdown pass to running back Charles Pierre. The touchdown was the first score of the game and with a successful extra point, the score gave the Owls the early lead, 7–0.

With over 12 minutes still remaining in the first quarter, Memphis received the Owls' kickoff to start their first possession of the game. A short return set up the Tigers at their own 33-yard line, and two quick rushes picked up their first first down of the game. On their third play, Memphis quarterback Martin Hankins connected on a 21-yard pass to wide receiver Carlton Robinzine, driving the Tigers into Owl territory. As had the Owls, Memphis advanced the ball steadily, and penetrated the Florida Atlantic red zone with ease. With 9:20 remaining, Hankins connected on his 23rd touchdown pass of the season, an eight-yard strike to tight end Brett Russell. The touchdown tied the score at 7–7 with more than half the first quarter still remaining. Each team had scored on its opening possession, and the game promised to turn into a high-scoring shootout.

Florida Atlantic's second possession of the game got off to an even better start than its first possession. Wide receiver Diivory Edgecomb, who was ranked second in the Sun Belt Conference in kick return yardage, broke free for a long 62-yard return that enabled the Owls to begin their possession deep in Memphis territory on the Memphis 28. Taking advantage of the excellent field position, Florida Atlantic picked up a quick first down, but once inside the Memphis 10-yard line, the Tiger defense stiffened and created the first defensive stop of the day. Due to the excellent field position, however, Florida Atlantic still managed to put points on the scoreboard via a 22-yard field goal by Warley Leroy. The kick was successful, and with 7:26 remaining in the first quarter, Florida Atlantic again took the lead, this time by a score of 10–7.

Memphis began its ensuing drive on its own 35-yard line after a short return. On the second play of the drive, Memphis backup running back T.J. Pitts was stopped for a one-yard loss. During the play, Pitts suffered an ankle injury and had to be carried off to the sideline. He suffered an ankle injury and did not return to the game. Perhaps hampered by the injury, Memphis was unable to pick up the first down and punted the ball away—the first such kick in the game. The punt gave Florida Atlantic its worst starting field position of the game, but the Owls were able to complete a 30-yard pass on their first play of the drive, erasing the deficit and setting up the offense in Memphis territory. FAU continued to move the ball effectively, picking up a quick first down before Diivory Edgecomb earned his second touchdown of the game on a 29-reception from Smith. The touchdown, which came with five minutes still remaining in the first quarter, gave the Owls a 17–7 lead over the Memphis Tigers. The drive had taken just four plays and covered 74 yards in only 1:34.

Memphis attempted to answer the quick Owl score with one of their own after taking possession on their own 30-yard line. Martin Hankins completed several passes to drive the Tigers to their 48-yard line before the drive stalled in the face of tough defense from Florida Atlantic. Memphis was forced to punt the ball away for the second time in as many possessions. Though the Tigers were foiled on offense, the kick pinned Florida Atlantic inside its own 20-yard line. Thanks to the poor field position and good defensive play from Memphis, the Owls failed to reach their own 40-yard line and were forced to punt the ball for the first time in the game. Punter Keegan Peterson failed to connect accurately with the ball, which bounced to a stop at the Memphis 37-yard line after traveling just 28 yards. A first-down run by Hankins put the ball at the 50-yard line as the first quarter ended. A long pass downfield fell incomplete, and the quarter ended with Memphis facing a second-and-ten situation and losing by a score of 17–7.

In the first quarter, Florida Atlantic got off to a hot start, scoring on every possession but the final one of the quarter. Thanks to their offensive effectiveness and several long kickoff returns, the Florida Atlantic Owls led Memphis 17–7 at the end of the first quarter.

=== Second Quarter ===
The second quarter began with Memphis in possession of the ball and facing second down at midfield. On the first play of the quarter, running back Joseph Doss dashed 12 yards for a first down. Memphis had success moving the ball, but wide receiver Maurice Jones apparently fumbled after a short catch. Jones, who was playing with a torn labrum, suffered a hit on the injured shoulder. Though the fumble was overturned on review, Jones was carted off the field on a stretcher, having aggravated his previous injury. Though Memphis still controlled the ball, its offense proved unable to pick up the first down, and kicker Joey Mack was sent in to attempt a 38-yard field goal in place of starting kicker Matt Reagan. The kick was good, and Memphis cut Florida Atlantic's lead to 17–10 with 12:15 remaining in the second quarter.

After the kickoff return, Florida Atlantic began its first drive of the second quarter from its own 41-yard line. On the first play, Memphis was called for a pass interference penalty, which gave FAU a first down in Memphis territory. Despite having been stopped with no score on its last drive of the first quarter, Florida Atlantic returned to the offensive efficiency that characterized its possessions at the beginning of the game. It took the Owls just four plays after the penalty to score their first touchdown of the second quarter, a 16-yard Chris Bonner reception. The drive took just 1:42 and gave FAU a 24–10 lead with 10:25 remaining in the first half.

Good coverage by the Owls' special teams on the kickoff pinned Memphis inside its own 15-yard line, and Memphis picked up a first down only with difficulty. Two long passes of 17 and 41 yards, however, reversed Memphis's field position, putting the Tigers deep in FAU territory and in position to score. Backed up inside their own 10-yard line, the FAU defense again stiffened to keep Memphis from crossing the goal line. After three straight plays were stopped for no gain or negative yardage, Memphis was forced to settle for a 35-yard field goal attempt that was successful. With 5:55 before halftime, Memphis cut the Owls' lead to 24–13. As before, however, good field position and a successful offense allowed Florida Atlantic to strike quickly for a score. Rusty Smith completed a 32-yard pass to Cortez Grant that made up most of the seven-play, 55-yard drive, which was capped by a four-yard reception by William Rose. Rose's touchdown gave FAU a 30–13 lead with 3:34 to play in the second quarter. Thanks to two false start penalties against Florida Atlantic on the extra point attempt, the normally-extra point attempt turned into a difficult kick, which was missed.

Facing a 17-point deficit and having only three and a half minutes before halftime, Memphis came out in a hurry-up offense. Three consecutive plays went for more than ten yards each, and generated three consecutive first downs. Inside the Florida Atlantic 30-yard line, the Owls managed to slow the Tigers' offense, forcing Memphis to convert a third down in order to keep the drive alive. Florida Atlantic continued to play tough defense, but after a sack on Memphis quarterback Martin Hankins was negated by a facemask penalty, the Tigers were able to finally punch the ball across the goal line on a 19-yard pass to Earnest Williams and gain their first touchdown of the second quarter. The touchdown and extra point cut FAU's lead to 30–20 with 52 seconds left on the clock.

Following the post-touchdown kickoff, the Memphis defense sacked Rusty Smith. Rather than chance an interception with a last-second interception, FAU head coach Howard Schnellenberger elected to let the clock run out and head into halftime with a 30–20 lead over Memphis.

=== Third quarter ===
Because Florida Atlantic began the game on offense, Memphis received the ball to start the second half of the game. After beginning at their own 31-yard line, Memphis maintained the offensive efficiency that it showed in its final drive of the first half. In just three plays, Memphis advanced the ball across the 50-yard line. A 16-yard pass by Hankins was followed by an 11-yard scramble for yet another first down. With short rushes and passes, Memphis continued to advance the ball deeper into FAU territory. Inside the 20-yard line, the Owls managed to force a third-and-long possession against Memphis, but the Tigers were able to convert the first down on a pass interference call against Florida Atlantic. Driving the ball inside the one-yard line, Memphis was called for a false start penalty, but on the next play, quarterback Martin Hankins threw a six-yard screen pass for a touchdown. The score came with 9:30 remaining in the quarter and cut Florida Atlantic's lead to just three points – the least it had been since the first quarter.

With their once-large lead having waned to a single field goal, FAU began its first drive of the second half hoping to put points on the scoreboard. A 55-yard kick return by Florida Atlantic seemed to put the Owls in excellent position to do just that, but three plays resulted in -11 yards, and FAU was limited to its first three-and-out possession of the game. The Owl punt rolled into the end zone for a touchback, and Memphis took over at its own 20-yard line. The Tigers earned two first downs, but a 10-yard holding penalty pushed Memphis back and allowed Florida Atlantic to stop the Tigers' offense and force a punt. Memphis punter Sutherland took the ball, but as he prepared to kick, two Owls broke through the Tigers' offensive line and blocked the kick. FAU recovered the kick, which was their third block of the season, at the Memphis 18-yard line and put their offense in point-blank range. Two plays after the block, Rusty Smith connected on a 16-yard pass to wide receiver Jason Harmon for a touchdown. The score, which came with 1:39 remaining in the quarter, was Florida Atlantic's first of the second half and restored FAU's lead to 10 points, 37–27.

On the kickoff, Memphis returner Michael Grandberry bobbled the football and was only able to bring it out to the Memphis 11-yard line. On the first play of the drive, Memphis quarterback Martin Hankins was tackled from behind, suffered an injury, and had to be escorted off the field. He did not return to the game, and his departure proved to be a critical deterrent to Memphis's hopes of victory. Replacing Hankins behind center was backup quarterback Will Hudgins. Hudgins was unable to pick up a first down after the Tigers committed a five-yard delay of game penalty. After the Memphis punt, Florida Atlantic took over on offense from its own 37-yard line with 29 seconds remaining in the quarter. On the second play of the drive, the Memphis defense came up with its biggest play of the game as LeRico Mathis picked off a pass by Smith and earned his third interception of the season.

The interception was returned to the Memphis 42-yard line as the third quarter came to an end. Florida Atlantic still led by 10 points, 37–27, but the interception denied Florida Atlantic a chance to extend its lead and gave Memphis a chance to make up at least part of the deficit heading into the fourth quarter.

=== Fourth Quarter ===
Following the Memphis interception on the final play of the third quarter, backup quarterback Will Hudgins returned to the field to take over the quarterback position from the injured Hankins. Hudgins was unable to advance the ball, and Memphis was forced to punt the ball away after going three-and-out. The punt was a good one, traveling 54 yards before being downed at the 4-yard line of Florida Atlantic. The poor field position didn't deter Florida Atlantic's offense, which completed a 30-yard pass on the second play of its first drive of the fourth quarter. The Owls drove down the field with success, reaching the Memphis 38-yard line with over 10:00 remaining in the game. There, the Memphis defense stopped FAU on three consecutive plays, forcing a fourth down. With three yards needed to earn a first down, Howard Schnellenberger elected to send in his offense rather than attempt a field goal. Two plays later, Diivory Hedgecomb rushed four yards for his first touchdown of the game. The score, which came with 9:12 remaining, gave Florida Atlantic a 44–27 lead. The 96-yard drive took 12 plays and 4:36.

Following the touchdown, Memphis desperately needed a touchdown to have even a chance of staying within striking distance of the quick-scoring Owls. Their cause was not helped by an illegal blocking penalty on the return, which pushed Memphis's starting field position back to their own 25-yard line. On the next three plays, the Memphis offense only managed two yards and was forced to punt the ball away yet again. Following the kick, FAU took over possession at its own 46-yard line. Despite good field position, the Owls were unable to earn a first down and punted the ball back to Memphis, which was forced to begin at its own 11-yard line with just 6:36 remaining and trailing by 17 points. Memphis again was unable to earn a first down, and after three inconsequential plays, punted the ball back to Florida Atlantic.

FAU took over at its own 12-yard line and proceeded to run out the final minutes of the game by continuing to rush the ball and only snapping the ball as the play clock ran down to zero. The final five minutes of the game passed quickly as the Owls controlled the flow of the clock, and FAU finalized its 17-point win, 44–27.

== Final statistics ==
Statistical comparison
	Tigers	Owls
1st downs	24	25
Total yards	398	465
Passing yards	281	350
Rushing yards	117	115
Penalties	5–45	5–29
3rd down conversions	9–18	4–10
4th down conversions	0–0	2–2
Turnovers	1	0
Time of Possession	28:49	31:11

Tigers Individual Leaders
Passing
Player	C/ATT^{*}	Yds	Pct	TD	INT
M. Hankins	25/39	281	64.1	3	0
W. Hudgens	1/5	0	20.0	0	0
M. Malouf	0/2	0	0.0	0	0
Rushing
Player	Car^{a}	Yds	Ave	TD	LG^{b}
J. Doss	20	91	4.6	0	16
M. Hankins	2	12	6.0	0	6
M. Malouf	2	11	5.5	0	6
W. Hudgens	6	10	1.7	0	4
T. Pitts	1	0	0.0	0	0
E. Williams	1	0	0.0	0	0
Receiving
Player	Rec^{c}	Yds	Ave	TD	LG^{b}
C. Singleton	4	63	15.8	1	41
B. Russell	4	45	11.3	1	16
J. Doss	5	42	8.4	0	15
D. Calhoun	4	40	10.0	0	17
E. Williams	3	37	12.3	1	19
C. Robinzine	2	25	12.5	0	21
D. Onarheim	1	10	10.0	0	10
G. Hinds	1	9	9.0	0	9
S. Black	1	5	5.0	0	5
M. Jones	1	5	5.0	0	5

^{*}Completions/Attempts ^{a}Carries ^{b}Long play ^{c}Receptions

Owls Individual Leaders
Passing
Player	C/ATT^{*}	Yds	Pct	TD	INT
R. Smith	25/32	336	78.1	5	1
S. Clayton	1/1	14	100.0	0	0
Rushing
Player	Car^{a}	Yds	Ave	TD	LG^{b}
C. Pierre	11	49	4.5	0	13
S. Clayton	4	32	8.0	0	12
D. Edgecomb	5	23	4.6	1	10
W. Rose	5	22	4.4	0	8
B. Manley	5	3	0.6	0	3
R. Housler	1	0	0.0	0	0
D. Walker	1	0	0.0	0	0
R. Smith	1	0	0.0	0	0
Receiving
Player	Rec^{c}	Yds	Ave	TD	LG^{b}
J. Harmon	7	97	13.9	1	29
L. Jean	4	73	18.3	0	30
C. Gent	3	52	17.3	0	32
W. Rose	6	52	8.7	1	15
D. Edgecomb	1	29	29.0	1	29
C. Bonner	2	27	13.5	1	16
J. Grant	1	14	14.0	0	14
C. Pierre	2	6	3.0	1	4

^{*}Completions/Attempts ^{a}Carries ^{b}Long play ^{c}Receptions

== Statistical summary ==
The 44–27 victory was the first Florida Atlantic bowl win in school history and Howard Schnellenberger's fifth bowl win as a head coach, bringing him to a perfect 5–0 record in bowl games. FAU became the youngest program in NCAA history to win a bowl game.

During the game, Memphis quarterback Martin Hankins passed the 3,000-yard mark for the season despite missing two games earlier in the year. During the game, he moved into first place all-time at Memphis in season passing yardage, completions, and touchdowns. Heading into the game, Memphis was ranked last in Division I in third-down defense, but ran an average of 78 plays on offense per game, enough for 7th in the NCAA.
