= Fred Cook (American football) =

American football player (born 1952)

- Cook in 1977

No. 72
- Position: Defensive end

Personal information
- Born: April 15, 1952 (age 74); Pascagoula, Mississippi, U.S.
- Listed height: 6 ft 4 in (1.93 m)
- Listed weight: 244 lb (111 kg)

Career information
- High school: Our Lady of Victory (MS)
- College: Southern Miss
- NFL draft: 1974: 2nd round, 32nd overall pick

Career history
- Baltimore Colts (1974–1980)

Career NFL statistics
- Games played: 104
- Starts: 104
- Sacks: 56
- Fumble recoveries: 14
- Interceptions: 2
- Stats at Pro Football Reference

Frederick Harrison Cook III (born April 15, 1952) is an American former professional football player. He played defensive end for the Baltimore Colts from 1974 through 1980.

== Early life and college ==
Cook played high school football for Our Lady of Victory in Mississippi, and to date is the only player from that school to make it to the pro level. Cook played college football for Southern Mississippi. Upon entering the university, Cook was one of the first African-Americans to play for the football program. After playing well on the freshman team, Cook was promoted to the varsity football team. He was a starter as a sophomore, ending the season with 68 tackles and 18 quarterback sacks, both school records. Graduation took apart the front line, as Cook was the lone returning starter for the 1972 season. The team only managed three wins, but Cook was still a dominant force, recording 19 sacks and 122 tackles. In 1974, his senior season, his tackles diminished, but he still lead the team in quarterback sacks. Cook was third-team All-American and played in both the senior bowl and Blue-Gray games.

== Professional career ==
Cook was selected by the Baltimore Colts in the second round of the 1972 NFL draft. The Colts had fallen on hard times. In 1974, under head coach Howard Schnellenberger the team was terrible, going 2–12, only getting wins versus the New York Jets and Atlanta Falcons. In 1975, the Colts had a new head coach in Ted Marchibroda and improved to 10–4. Cook started all 14 games, just as he did as a rookie the previous season. Cook picked off a Steve Grogan pass for his first career interception in the Colts 34–21 over the New England Patriots. Cook also scored the only touchdown of his career when he returned a fumble recovery for a score in another game that season. The Colts qualified for the playoffs three times during Cook's career, but they lost in each appearance. One of those was the "Ghost To The Post" game in which Oakland Raiders quarterback Ken Stabler hit tight end Dave Casper for the winning touchdown in the final minutes of the game. Oakland won 37–31.

Cook was a full-time starter in each of his seasons with the Colts, playing in 104 games for the franchise. On July 19, 1981, the Colts traded Cook, who was pending to be a free agent, to the Washington Redskins for a few draft picks. However, Cook was dealing injuries and never played for Washington.

== Personal life ==
In 2009, Southern Mississippi inducted Cook into their legends club. The club consist of former players, many of whom went on to careers in the NFL. Brett Favre, Ray Guy, Reggie Collier, and Sammy Winder are among the players in the club. When Hurricane Katrina struck Mississippi, Cook's elementary school was completely destroyed, and he himself lost two cars. He also lost the son of a friend to suicide not long after the storm. Though the losses left him battling depression, Cook vowed to not let it get him down. Not long after the storm, he returned to Baltimore for an alumni reunion.
