= Tom MacLeod =

American football player (born 1951)

- MacLeod in 1977

No. 56, 52
- Position: Linebacker

Personal information
- Born: January 10, 1951 (age 75); Proctor, Minnesota, U.S.
- Listed height: 6 ft 3 in (1.91 m)
- Listed weight: 225 lb (102 kg)

Career information
- High school: Proctor
- College: Minnesota
- NFL draft: 1973: 3rd round, 74th overall pick

Career history
- Green Bay Packers (1973); Baltimore Colts (1974–1977)

Career NFL statistics
- Games played: 64
- Starts: 60
- Quarterback sacks: 7.5 (Unofficial)
- Interceptions: 5
- Fumble recoveries: 6
- Stats at Pro Football Reference

Thomas William MacLeod (born January 10, 1951) is an American former professional football player who was a linebacker in the National Football League (NFL). He played college football for the Minnesota Golden Gophers and was selected by the Green Bay Packers in the 1973 NFL draft.

Four of MacLeod's five year NFL career was spent with the Baltimore Colts.

A starter as a rookie in his only campaign with the Packers, MacLeod was acquired along with a 1975 eighth-round selection (192nd overall–Northwestern State running back Mario Cage) by the Baltimore Colts for Ted Hendricks and a 1975 second-round pick (28th overall–traded to Los Angeles Rams for John Hadl) on August 13, 1974.

Although he missed the entire 1976 season due to injury, MacLeod was a starter in each of the four other seasons he spent in Baltimore until his retirement as an active player on July 20, 1978.
