= Tim Baylor =

American football player (born 1954)

- Baylor in 1977

No. 47
- Position: Defensive back

Personal information
- Born: May 23, 1954 (age 72); Washington, D.C., U.S.
- Listed height: 6 ft 6 in (1.98 m)
- Listed weight: 195 lb (88 kg)

Career information
- High school: Cardozo (Washington, D.C.)
- College: Morgan State
- NFL draft: 1976: 10th round, 283rd overall pick

Career history
- Baltimore Colts (1976–1978); Minnesota Vikings (1979)

Career NFL statistics
- Games played: 59
- Starts: 1
- Fumble recoveries: 3
- Stats at Pro Football Reference

Tim O. Baylor (born May 23, 1954) is an American former professional football player who was a defensive back in the National Football League (NFL). He played college football for the Morgan State Bears in Baltimore, Maryland, and was selected by the Baltimore Colts in the tenth round of the 1976 NFL draft. He played for the Colts for three seasons and the Minnesota Vikings for one season in 1979. Baylor was the tallest defensive back in history of the NFL at 6'6" He is a member of Iota Phi Theta fraternity.

== Post-football career ==
Even since retiring from the NFL, Baylor has been very involved in the business and political scene in Minneapolis, Minnesota community, where he currently resides. Baylor is founder and president of JADT Development Group, a residential and commercial construction firm, in Minneapolis. He also operates three McDonald's franchises in the Minneapolis–St. Paul area. Baylor has also served as a former member of the Minneapolis Planning Commission from 1992 to 2001, and ran as a candidate for Lieutenant Governor for the State of Minnesota in 2006.
