= Robert Irsay =

American professional football team owner (1923–1997)

- Irsay in 1976

Profile
- Position: Owner

Personal information
- Born: March 5, 1923; Chicago, Illinois, U.S.
- Died: January 14, 1997 (aged 73); Indianapolis, Indiana, U.S.

Career history
- Baltimore/Indianapolis Colts (1972–1996) (Note: While Irsay died on January 14, 1997, this was still during the 1996 season which is why 1996 is shown here instead of 1997) Owner

Awards and highlights
- Indianapolis Colts Ring of Honor

Robert Irsay (March 5, 1923 – January 14, 1997) was an American professional football team owner. He owned the National Football League (NFL)'s Baltimore/Indianapolis Colts franchise from 1972 until his death in 1997. He was the father of former Colts owner Jim Irsay.

== Biography ==
=== Early life and education ===
Robert Irsay was born on March 5, 1923, in Chicago, the son of Charles Israel and the former Elaine Nyitrai, Jewish immigrants from Hungary. The family name was changed to Irsay in 1931, when Bob was eight years old. He attended Lane Tech High School in Chicago. According to his estranged younger brother, Ronald, the family wasn't wealthy, "but my dad owned several buildings in Chicago and at one time was one of the largest tin knockers [sheet metal contractors] in the city.

The Irsay children were raised as Jews. In 1940, Irsay enrolled at the University of Illinois, joining Sigma Alpha Mu, a Jewish fraternity.

Years later, Irsay denied his Jewish heritage, contrary to his mother's testimony that his father was actually his step-father and that he was, and had always been, Catholic.

Irsay left the University of Illinois after attending for just three semesters plus the summer session of 1942. The United States was by then embroiled in World War II and on October 23, 1942, he joined the United States Marine Corps. Irsay was discharged just 5-1/2 months later as a sergeant, on April 3, 1943, without having served overseas. Irsay stated his military service as follows: "I was in the Army and the Navy and the Marines. The Navy assigned me to the Seabees. I saw minor action. I don't want to talk about it."

=== Commercial activity ===
In 1946, he was hired by his father's heating and ventilation business, the Acord Ventilating Company, where he worked as a salesman and bid on projects. He left employment there on the last day of 1951, which initiated a bitter family feud. As part of his severance package, Irsay was allowed to take a lucrative contract with the Caterpillar Tractor Company and several smaller contracts that he had negotiated, a building used in connection with that account, and several vehicles and shop equipment that allowed him to establish a new rival firm, the Robert Irsay Company, without incurring substantial bank debt. Five employees from Acord at the time of his departure followed him.

His brother Ron minced no words when queried about the company split three decades later: "I don't know how else to say this, but my brother tried to run my father out of business. Bob actually worked to try to destroy his own father. Oh, he's a real sweetheart, all right." His mother, then in her 80s, was even more outspoken about her eldest son: "He's a devil on earth, that one. He stole all our money and he said goodbye. He don't care for me. I don't even see him for 35 years.... When my husband got sick and got the heart attack, he took advantage. He was no good. He was a bad boy. I don't want to talk about him."

Despite Ron dropping out of college to attempt to save the family business, Acord Ventilation went into rapid decline immediately after Bob's departure, going out of business less than three years later.

=== NFL ownership ===
Irsay assumed ownership of the Baltimore Colts on July 13, 1972, after acquiring the Los Angeles Rams from the estate of Dan Reeves and swapping franchises with Carroll Rosenbloom, all on that day. His last-minute $19 million bid for the Rams was $2 million more than that of future Tampa Bay Buccaneers owner Hugh Culverhouse. Irsay's majority share in the Colts was initially 51%, with Willard Keland of Racine, Wisconsin, owning the rest. He additionally announced the appointment of Joe Thomas as Baltimore's new general manager, succeeding Don Klosterman who accompanied Rosenbloom to Los Angeles.

Irsay's first controversial act with the Colts was his changing of head coaches from Howard Schnellenberger to general manager Thomas after a 30–10 defeat to the Philadelphia Eagles at Veterans Stadium on September 29, 1974, which extended the team's season-opening losing streak to three. While on the Colts sideline during the second half, he voiced his preference for Bert Jones as the starting quarterback over Marty Domres by asking Schnellenberger about when he was going to make such a change. Schnellenberger's sarcastic reply resulted in his postgame dismissal. Irsay had first gone to the press box to inform Thomas that he was the new head coach, and then to the locker room to announce his actions to the Colts players, before breaking the news to Schnellenberger in a discussion in the coaches' office. Middle linebacker Mike Curtis voiced the players' displeasure by saying, "This just tears me up. In defense of Irsay, he's a nice guy, an emotional guy. He doesn't know a lot about football, but sometimes you lose control in an emotional situation."

Irsay's verbal abuse of his players after a loss in a final preseason match to the Detroit Lions at the Pontiac Silverdome on September 2, 1976, led to head coach Ted Marchibroda's resignation three days later on September 5. Marchibroda was also at odds with Thomas over player personnel decisions. He was rehired two days later on September 7 after offensive and defensive coordinators Whitey Dovell and Maxie Baughan threatened to quit and the players considered boycotting practice, all in support of Marchibroda.

Irsay's relationships with certain players in contract disputes as well as with his coaches, at times affected the Colts' on-field woes in the ensuing years. He was accused of bad faith bargaining and racial discrimination by running back Lydell Mitchell who was eventually sent to the San Diego Chargers on August 23, 1978. He added, "I don't think he cares about the team, it's just a toy to him." Dutton was dealt to the Dallas Cowboys on October 9, 1979. Irsay also continually second-guessed Marchibroda.

=== Moving the Colts ===
"I have not any intentions of moving the goddamn team. If I did, I will tell you about it, but I'm staying here."

— Robert Irsay, January 20, 1984

On January 20, 1984, Irsay appeared drunk before the Baltimore media and exclaimed, "This is my team!" He reiterated that, despite problems, the rumors that he was moving the team were untrue. With negotiations over improvements to Memorial Stadium at an impasse, one of the chambers of the Maryland state legislature passed a law on March 27, 1984, allowing the city of Baltimore to seize the Colts under eminent domain, which city and county officials had threatened to do. Irsay claimed the city promised him a new football stadium, something they denied, saying that poor attendance had precluded the option of a new stadium. The next day, fearing a dawn raid on the team's Owings Mills headquarters, Irsay accepted a deal offered by the city of Indianapolis.

Indianapolis mayor William H. Hudnut III contacted John Burnside Smith, then CEO of the Mayflower Transit Company, who arranged for fifteen trucks to pack the team's property hurriedly and transport it to Indianapolis in the early hours of the morning of March 29. An ecstatic crowd in Indianapolis greeted the arrival of its new NFL team, and the team received 143,000 season ticket requests in just two weeks.

Baltimore was without a National Football League team until another controversial move in 1996, when Art Modell brought the personnel of the Cleveland Browns there to become the Baltimore Ravens.

=== Personal life ===
He married Harriet Pogorzelski on July 12, 1947, at Temple Sholom in Chicago, with Rabbi Louis Binstock officiating. According to Irsay, he had a second Catholic wedding to Pogorzelski, the daughter of Polish immigrants. They raised their children Roman Catholic.

Bob and Harriet Irsay had three children – Thomas, Roberta, and Jim. Roberta was killed at age 14 in a 1971 automobile accident on I-294 outside Chicago. Thomas, who suffered from a severe mental disability, lived in a Florida facility until his death in 1999 at the age of 45.

Irsay, who had divorced Harriet, married Nancy Clifford on June 17, 1989, at Second Presbyterian Church in Indianapolis; Hudnut officiated the ceremony. Nancy Irsay died November 7, 2015, at the age of 65.

=== Death and legacy ===
Irsay suffered a stroke in November 1995 and was in intensive care at St. Vincent Indianapolis Hospital for several months. After his release he developed pneumonia, heart and kidney problems, for which he was transferred to the Mayo Clinic in Rochester, Minnesota. He died in Indianapolis on January 14, 1997. He is interred at Crown Hill Cemetery and Arboretum in Section 88, Lot 5 at the coordinates 39.818932°N 86.1762901°W.

After Irsay's death in Indianapolis on January 14, 1997, the Colts were inherited by his son, Jim. Bill Polian handled the day-to-day operations of the team as vice-chairman until his dismissal after the 2011 season. Polian was succeeded as vice chair by Jim Irsay's three daughters — Carlie Irsay-Gordon, Casey Foyt, and Kalen Jackson — who are each part owners and vice-chairs of the team.

Irsay was the first person inducted into the Indianapolis Colts Ring of Honor, being so memorialized on September 23, 1996.

== Notes ==
Sporting positions
Preceded by Carroll Rosenbloom	Baltimore/Indianapolis Colts owner 1972–1997	Succeeded by Jim Irsay
Preceded by Dan Reeves	Los Angeles Rams owner 1972	Succeeded by Carroll Rosenbloom
