= Bob Van Duyne =

American gridiron football player (born 1952)

- Van Duyne in 1977

No. 67
- Positions: Guard, Tackle

Personal information
- Born: May 15, 1952 (age 74); San Bernardino, California, U.S.
- Listed height: 6 ft 5 in (1.96 m)
- Listed weight: 243 lb (110 kg)

Career information
- High school: Burien (WA) Highline
- College: Idaho
- NFL draft: 1974: 10th round, 240th overall pick

Career history
- Baltimore Colts (1974–1980); Hamilton Tiger-Cats (1981); BC Lions (1982); Tampa Bay Bandits (1983)

Career NFL statistics
- Games played: 88
- Games Starts: 17
- Stats at Pro Football Reference

Robert Scott Van Duyne (born May 15, 1952) is an American former professional football player who was a guard for seven seasons with the Baltimore Colts of the National Football League (NFL). He played college football for the Idaho Vandals.

Van Duyne was regarded as a versatile reserve player by the Colts, able to play all three interior line positions — center, guard, and tackle. His primary role was that of a special teams player, appearing in all but five games during the first six seasons of his professional career.

Van Duyne was the starting right tackle for the Colts for the 1978 season, starting in 12 of the team's 14 games.
