= Robert Pratt (American football) =

American football player (born 1951)

- Pratt in 1977

No. 61
- Position: Guard

Personal information
- Born: May 25, 1951 (age 75); Richmond, Virginia, U.S.
- Listed height: 6 ft 3 in (1.91 m)
- Listed weight: 255 lb (116 kg)

Career information
- College: North Carolina
- NFL draft: 1974: 3rd round, 67th overall pick

Career history
- Baltimore Colts (1974–1981); Seattle Seahawks (1982–1985)

Awards and highlights
- NFL Lineman of the year (1983)

Career NFL statistics
- Games played: 170
- Starts: 150
- Stats at Pro Football Reference

Robert Pratt (born May 25, 1951) is an American former professional football player who was a guard in the National Football League (NFL). He graduated from St. Christopher's School in 1970 where he garnered All Prep League honors. He played college football for the North Carolina Tar Heels.

Pratt is a 2013 inductee into the Virginia Sports Hall of Fame.

== College career ==
Pratt earned a scholarship to the University of North Carolina at Chapel Hill where he played for Head Coach Bill Dooley. He was a three-year starter at left tackle and was an All American and All ACC selection. His team won two ACC Championships in 1971 and 1972. The 1972 team achieved the school's first 11–1 season culminating in a Sun Bowl victory against Texas Tech.

== Professional career ==
In the 1974 NFL draft, Pratt was selected in the third round by the Baltimore Colts. He started at left guard from 1975 to 1981, playing in 105 consecutive games. He helped his team win three straight AFC East Division Titles from 1975 to 1977. He was a key protector of NFL MVP and Pro Bowl quarterback Bert Jones.

In 1982, Pratt was traded to the Seattle Seahawks where he helped the franchise get into the playoffs in 1983 and 1984, the first such appearances in the franchise's history. He started in the AFC title game after the 1983 season. In 1983, he was voted by the organization as the Lineman of the Year.

After a twelve-year career, he retired in 1986.

== Personal life ==
Pratt lives in Richmond, Virginia. He is the chairman and CEO of Mid-Atlantic Golf, Inc., the owner of Sycamore Creek Golf Course in Manakin-Sabot, Virginia. He was inducted into the Virginia Sports Hall of Fame in 2013.
