= Nelson Munsey =

American football player (1948–2009)

- Munsey in 1977

No. 31
- Position: Cornerback

Personal information
- Born: July 2, 1948; Uniontown, Pennsylvania, U.S.
- Died: July 8, 2009 (aged 61); San Diego, California, U.S.
- Listed height: 6 ft 1 in (1.85 m)
- Listed weight: 188 lb (85 kg)

Career information
- High school: Uniontown
- College: Wyoming
- NFL draft: 1972: undrafted

Career history
- Baltimore Colts (1972–1977)

Career NFL statistics
- Interceptions: 7
- Interception yards: 71
- Touchdowns: 2
- Stats at Pro Football Reference

Nelson Emory Munsey (July 2, 1948 – July 8, 2009) was an American professional football player who was a cornerback in the National Football League (NFL). He was signed by the Baltimore Colts as an undrafted free agent in 1972. He played college football for the Wyoming Cowboys.

He was the older brother of Chuck Muncie who also played in the NFL for the New Orleans Saints and San Diego Chargers.

== Early life ==
After he starred as a running back at Uniontown Area High School in his hometown, Munsey switched to defensive back when he played at the University of Wyoming. Munsey's football career got a jump start when began to play for the Norfolk Neptunes in 1969. It was while playing for the Neptunes that he met Vivian Seaborne, the first black cheerleader for the Norfolk Neptunes.

== Professional career ==
Munsey had two touchdowns, seven interceptions and five fumble recoveries in 72 games with the Colts, all at right cornerback. His first touchdown was scored in his rookie year on a three-yard fumble recovery return in the first quarter of a 24–21 road loss to the San Francisco 49ers on November 12, 1972. His other one came in the fourth quarter on December 21, 1975 when he intercepted a Steve Grogan pass and returned it thirty yards to clinch a regular-season-ending 34–21 home victory over the New England Patriots and the first of three consecutive American Football Conference (AFC) Eastern Division championships for the Colts.

The 1975 season was the only one in his career in which Munsey started all the games played by the Colts. His last start of that campaign was a 28–10 road loss to the Pittsburgh Steelers in the AFC semifinals on December 27, 1975. The last NFL contest Munsey played was another conference semifinal match two years later on December 24, 1977 when the Colts lost to the Oakland Raiders 37–31 in double overtime at Baltimore's Memorial Stadium. On the game's deciding play, Dave Casper ran past Munsey to catch his third touchdown of the contest.

Munsey spent the 1978 season with the Minnesota Vikings but never saw any action.

== Death ==
Munsey died of a heart disease on July 8, 2009, just six days after his 61st birthday.
