= Dan Dickel =

American football player (born 1952)

- Dickel in 1977

No. 55, 57
- Position: Linebacker

Personal information
- Born: August 24, 1952 (age 74); Fort Riley, Kansas, U.S.
- Listed height: 6 ft 3 in (1.91 m)
- Listed weight: 225 lb (102 kg)

Career information
- High school: Mid-Prairie (Wellman, Iowa)
- College: Iowa
- NFL draft: 1974: 7th round, 170th overall pick

Career history
- Baltimore Colts (1974–1977); Detroit Lions (1978)

Career NFL statistics
- Games played: 60
- Starts: 1
- Interceptions: 1
- Fumble recoveries: 2
- Stats at Pro Football Reference

Daniel Lee Dickel (born August 24, 1952) is an American former professional football player who was a linebacker in the National Football League (NFL). He played linebacker/defensive end for the University of Iowa before being selected by the Baltimore Colts in the seventh round of the 1974 NFL draft.

== Early life ==
Dickel attended Mid-Prairie High School in Wellman, Iowa. After high school Dickel attended the University of Iowa. He was named the Hawkeyes team MVP in 1972 as well as leading the Hawkeyes in tackles for loss in 1972 and 1973. Dickel also was honored as being a co-captain in 1973 for Iowa.

== Professional career ==
Dickel spent five seasons in the NFL, four with the Baltimore Colts from 1974 to 1977, in which he played all 56 of the team's games, and one with the Detroit Lions in 1978. After playing every game from 1974-1977 with the Colts, almost exclusively as a special teams player and reserve, Dickel played in only four games in 1978 for the Lions.

== Coaching career ==
Dickel was the head football coach at Highland High School in Riverside, Iowa, Iowa City West High School in Iowa City, Iowa, and Kewanee High School in Kewanee, Illinois. He also served as an assistant coach at both Regina High School and Iowa City High School in Iowa City and West Liberty High School football team in West Liberty, Iowa.
