= Mike Barnes (defensive lineman) =

American football player (born 1950)

- Barnes in 1977

No. 63
- Positions: Defensive end, defensive tackle

Personal information
- Born: December 24, 1950 (age 75); Pittsburgh, Pennsylvania, U.S.
- Listed height: 6 ft 6 in (1.98 m)
- Listed weight: 255 lb (116 kg)

Career information
- High school: Peabody (PA)
- College: Miami (FL)
- NFL draft: 1973: 2nd round, 35th overall pick

Career history
- Baltimore Colts (1973–1981)

Awards and highlights
- Pro Bowl (1977)

Career NFL statistics
- Games played: 113
- Starts: 95
- Sacks: 44.5
- Fumble recoveries: 4
- Stats at Pro Football Reference

Mike Barnes (born December 24, 1950) is an American former professional football player who was a defensive tackle for the Baltimore Colts of the National Football League (NFL) from 1973 through 1981. He was selected to the Pro Bowl after the 1977 season.

== Biography ==
Mike Barnes was born in Pittsburgh, Pennsylvania on December 24, 1950. He attended Peabody High School in Pittsburgh, where he was a member of the football and swimming teams coached by former Baltimore Colts player George Radosevich. He played both ways on the gridiron, blocking and running as a fullback on offense and anchoring the line as a defensive tackle on defense.

Barnes played college football for the Miami Hurricanes. He started for the Hurricanes as a sophomore and junior at defensive end, before being moved to the defensive tackle position as a senior, where he amassed 177 tackles.

Barnes was drafted in the 2nd round of the 1973 NFL draft by the Baltimore Colts, who made the 6'6" defender the 35th pick overall.

In Baltimore, Barnes became an important member of the Colts' "Sack Pack," gaining his highest accolade as a member of the AFC's Pro Bowl team in 1977.

Barnes played his entire 9-year career in Baltimore, seeing action in 113 games, 95 of which he started. He retired from the NFL after the 1981 season.
