= Howard Schnellenberger =

American football player and coach (1934–2021)

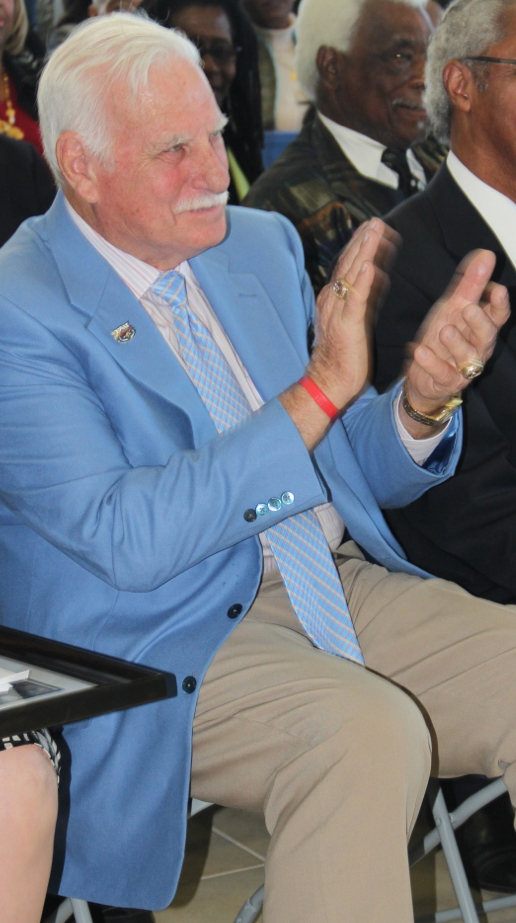
- Schnellenberger in 2012

Biographical details
- Born: March 16, 1934; Saint Meinrad, Indiana, U.S.
- Died: March 27, 2021 (aged 87); Boca Raton, Florida, U.S.

Playing career
- 1952–1956: Kentucky
- 1957–1958: Toronto Argonauts
- Position: End

Coaching career (HC unless noted)
- 1959–1960: Kentucky (WR/TE)
- 1961–1965: Alabama (OC)
- 1966–1969: Los Angeles Rams (ends)
- 1970–1972: Miami Dolphins (OC/WR/TE)
- 1973–1974: Baltimore Colts
- 1975–1978: Miami Dolphins (OC)
- 1979–1983: Miami (FL)
- 1985–1994: Louisville
- 1995: Oklahoma
- 2001–2011: Florida Atlantic

Administrative career (AD unless noted)
- 1998–1999: Florida Atlantic (director of football ops.)

Head coaching record
- Overall: 158–151–3 (college); 4–13 (NFL)
- Bowls: 6–0
- Tournaments: 2–1 (NCAA D-I-AA playoffs)

Accomplishments and honors

Championships
- National (1983); Sun Belt (2007)

Awards
- Eddie Robinson Coach of the Year Award (1983); Sun Belt Coach of the Year (2007); Paul "Bear" Bryant Lifetime Achievement Award (2021); First-team All-American (1955); First-team All-SEC (1955)

Howard Leslie Schnellenberger (March 16, 1934 – March 27, 2021) was an American football coach with long service at both the professional and college levels. He held head coaching positions with the National Football League (NFL)'s Baltimore Colts and in college for the University of Miami, University of Louisville, University of Oklahoma and Florida Atlantic University. He won a national championship with Miami in 1983.

Schnellenberger worked extensively as an assistant coach at the college and professional levels, including as part of the staff of the undefeated 1972 Miami Dolphins. He was responsible for recruiting Joe Namath to Alabama for Bear Bryant in 1961.

== Early life and education ==
Schnellenberger was born March 16, 1934, in Saint Meinrad, Indiana, to German American parents, Leslie and Rosena (Hoffman) Schnellenberger. He graduated from Flaget High School in Louisville, Kentucky, where he played football, basketball, and baseball and earned a scholarship to the University of Kentucky.

Schnellenberger played college football as an end for the Kentucky Wildcats, and was named a 1955 All-American by the Associated Press and Newspaper Enterprise Association.

== Canadian Football League ==
He then played professionally for two seasons with the CFL Toronto Argonauts.

== Coaching career ==
=== University of Kentucky ===
He subsequently worked as an assistant coach at Kentucky under head coach Blanton Collier in 1959 and 1960.

=== University of Alabama ===
In January 1961, Schnellenberger joined the coaching staff of the Alabama Crimson Tide as an assistant to head coach Bear Bryant. While on Bryant's staff, Schnellenberger helped recruit quarterbacks Joe Namath and Ken Stabler, and helped coach Alabama to three national championships (1961, 1964, and 1965) in five seasons. Schnellenberger left Alabama in early 1966 to take a job in the National Football League (NFL) as offensive ends coach of the Los Angeles Rams under George Allen. After four seasons with the Rams, Schnellenberger was hired by Don Shula of the Miami Dolphins in early 1970. Initially named as wide receivers coach, Schnellenberger was the Dolphins' offensive coordinator by July. He helped coach the Dolphins to their undefeated 1972 season and victory in Super Bowl VII.

=== Baltimore Colts ===
Schnellenberger signed a three-year contract to succeed John Sandusky as head coach of the Baltimore Colts on February 14, 1973. He was reunited with general manager Joe Thomas, with whom he had been colleagues while with the Miami Dolphins. He joined a team in the midst of an influx of younger players.

The Colts went 4–10–0 in his one full season but managed to upset the defending Super Bowl champion Dolphins towards the end of the 1973 season, though the Dolphins second team played most of the game.

His time with the Colts ended after a 30–10 defeat to the Philadelphia Eagles at Veterans Stadium on September 29, 1974, which extended the Colts' season-opening losing streak to three. While stalking the Colts sideline during the second half, team owner Robert Irsay, who had a preference for Bert Jones as the starting quarterback over Marty Domres, asked Schnellenberger about when he was going to make such a quarterback change. Schnellenberger's sarcastic reply resulted in his postgame dismissal. Irsay had first gone to the press box to inform Thomas that he was the new head coach and then to the locker room to announce the coaching change to the Colts players before finally breaking the news to Schnellenberger in a heated discussion in the coaches office.

Schnellenberger returned to the Dolphins coaching staff the following year and remained there until he was offered the head coaching job at the University of Miami.

=== University of Miami ===
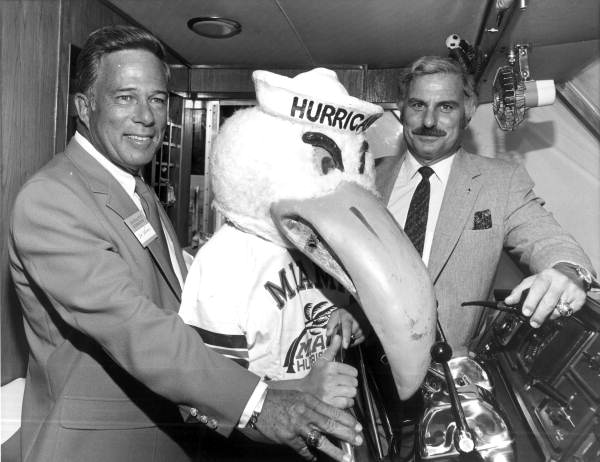
Schnellenberger (right) as University of Miami head coach in 1981

In 1979, Schnellenberger arrived to a University of Miami program that was struggling. The program was nearly dropped by the university just a few years earlier. Drawing from the boot camp methodology learned from mentors Bryant and Shula and a pro-style pass-oriented playbook not yet the norm in college football, Schnellenberger introduced a passing game at Miami that gave them advantage over teams not equipped to defend such an aggressive offensive passing attack. By his third season at Miami, the team had twice finished the season in the AP Poll's Top 25, something that had not happened for Miami since 1966.

Schnellenberger revolutionized recruiting South Florida high school talent by building a metaphorical "fence around South Florida" and recruiting only the "State of Miami." His eye for talent in this area led to many programs around the nation paying greater attention to South Florida high school prospects. Under his "State of Miami" plan, Schnellenberger's teams took the best from the three-county area around the city, went after the state's best, then aimed at targets among the nation's elite recruits; it became a model of how to recruit in college football.

He coached Miami to its first national championship in 1983, defeating Nebraska in the Orange Bowl. Following the season, Schnellenberger resigned to become part-owner, president, general manager and head coach of The Spirit of Miami of the United States Football League, a relocated Washington Federals franchise. In August, however, the USFL announced that it would shift to a fall schedule. The owner-to-be for the Federals backed out of the deal, knowing he could not hope to compete head-to-head with the Miami Dolphins. A new backer moved the team to Orlando as the Renegades, but Schnellenberger opted not to follow the team to Central Florida. Schnellenberger was replaced as head coach of the Hurricanes by Jimmy Johnson.

Schnellenberger was interviewed about his time at the University of Miami for the documentary The U, which premiered December 12, 2009, on ESPN.

Schnellenberger was inducted into the University of Miami Sports Hall of Fame in 1993.

=== University of Louisville ===
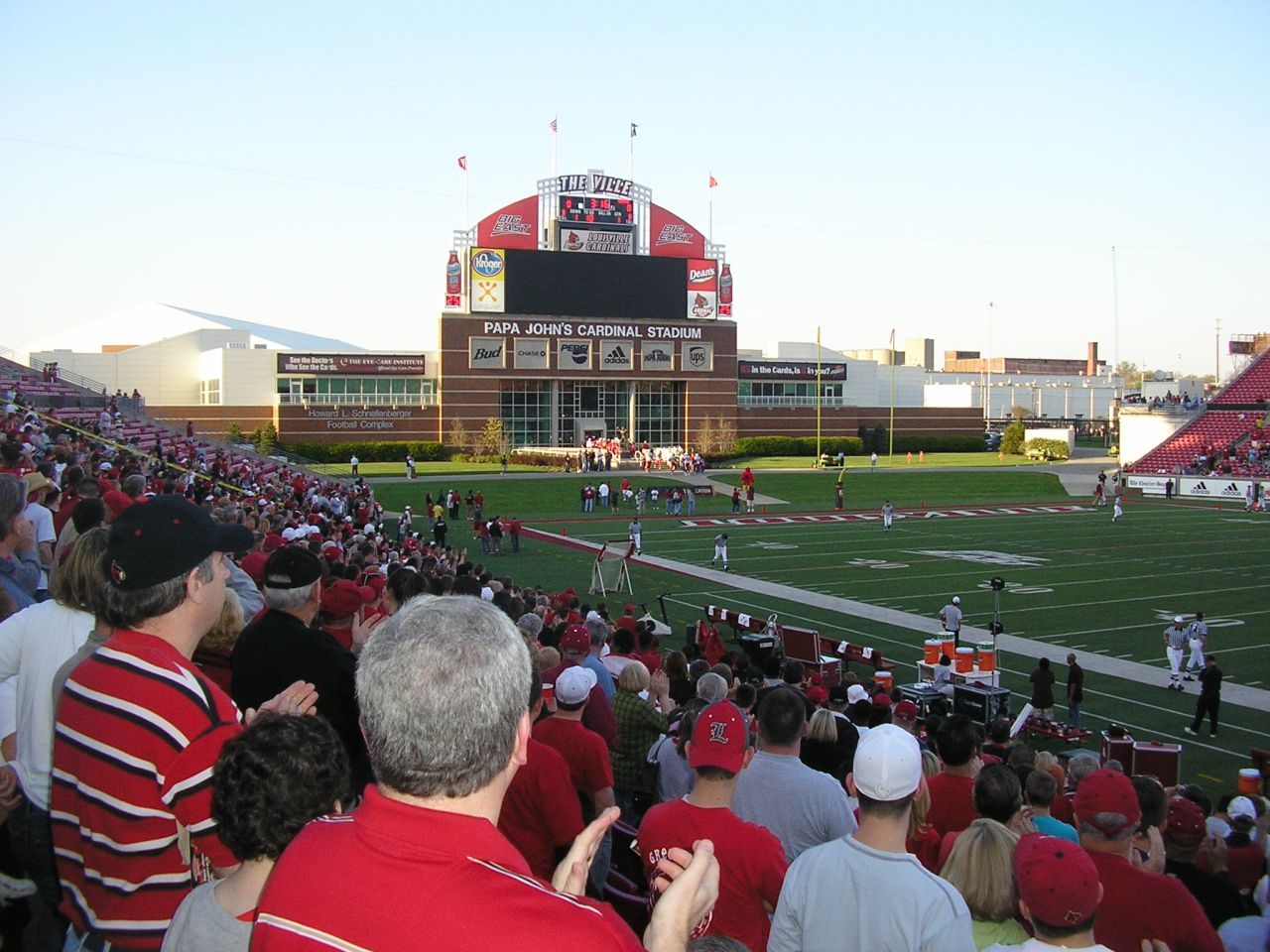
The Howard L. Schnellenberger Football Complex at Cardinal Stadium in Louisville, Kentucky in 2007

In 1985, Schnellenberger returned to his hometown to coach another struggling program, the University of Louisville Cardinals. Schnellenberger inherited a situation that was as bad, if not worse, than what he'd inherited at Miami. The Cardinals had not had a winning season since 1978, and only two winning records in the previous 12 years. They played at old Cardinal Stadium, a minor-league baseball stadium, and often hosted crowds so small that the school was forced to give tickets away. They also played in the long shadow of the school's powerful men's basketball team. The situation was so grave at Louisville that officials were considering dropping the football program down to NCAA Division I-AA. Nonetheless, at his opening press conference, he stunned reporters and fans by proclaiming the program "is on a collision course with the national championship. The only variable is time."

After going 8–24–1 in his first three years, Schnellenberger was able to turn the program around and go 24–9–1 the next three seasons. In 10 years, he led the Cardinals to their fourth and fifth bowl games in school history. They won them both, including a 34–7 thrashing of the Alabama Crimson Tide in the 1991 Fiesta Bowl, capping a 10–1–1 season and the school's then-highest appearance in the final AP poll (14th). The Fiesta Bowl appearance was the school's second-ever New Year's Day bowl game, after their win in the 1958 Sun Bowl.

Schnellenberger left Louisville after the 1994 season. He recalled in a 2012 interview that his departure was a direct result of the impending creation of Conference USA:

I didn't leave because of money. I wasn't looking to go anywhere until that president (Dr. Donald Swain) pulled that baloney and put us in that conference that I didn't want to be in. I wasn't going to coach in a conference where I didn't have a chance to compete for the national championship.

Schnellenberger was replaced by Ron Cooper. Although Schnellenberger's record at Louisville was two games under .500 (largely due to his first three years), he has remained in the good graces of Cardinal fans due to the poor state the program was in when he arrived, giving him a reputation as a "program builder." He is also credited with laying the foundation for the program's subsequent rise to prominence. The Cardinals went to nine straight bowl games from 1998 to 2006. The Howard L. Schnellenberger Football Complex at the current Cardinal Stadium is named after him; Schnellenberger initially proposed building the on-campus stadium during his tenure at Louisville and is credited with keeping the project alive.

=== University of Oklahoma ===
Late in the 1994 season, Oklahoma head coach Gary Gibbs was forced to resign, but was allowed to finish out the season. Schnellenberger was hired to replace him on December 16, 1994. Repeating his bluster upon taking the Louisville job, Schnellenberger declared, "They'll write books and make movies about my time here." He also traveled across the state, with the stated goal of renewing the enthusiasm in what he called "Sooner Nation." After watching his new team for the first time in the 1994 Copper Bowl (in which Oklahoma was routed by BYU 31–6), he alienated his soon-to-be players by declaring them "out of shape, unorganized and unmotivated" and that they disgraced Oklahoma's rich football tradition.

After a 3–0 start that had the Sooners ranked in the top 10, the season quickly came unraveled after a 38–17 loss to Colorado. That was the start of a stretch where the Sooners went only 2–5–1 the rest of the way, including a 2–5 record in conference play—Oklahoma's first losing record in conference play in 31 years and only the second since World War II. They were also defeated 12–0 by Oklahoma State—the Sooners' first loss to their in-state rival in 20 years. En route, the Sooners were penalized nine times per game, unusual for Schnellenberger-coached teams. The Sooners closed out the season with their second-straight shutout loss, 37–0 to No. 1 Nebraska, which denied the Sooners a winning record and a chance at a bowl game.

On December 19, 1995, Schnellenberger resigned unexpectedly after one season, stating that "in recent months a climate has developed toward the program, understandably in some cases and perhaps unfairly in others, that has changed my outlook on the situation. A change could help improve that climate."

Schnellenberger has not been held in high regard by Sooner fans, in part because he made no secret of his lack of interest in Oklahoma's football history (his comments after the 1994 Copper Bowl notwithstanding). Soon after his arrival, he ordered the destruction of several old football files (which were actually preserved without his knowledge). On his statewide tour, he vowed to put together a team that would make "Sooner Nation" forget about head coaches Bud Wilkinson and Barry Switzer.

In his only year at Oklahoma, Schnelleneberger lost by one-sided margins to both Kansas and Kansas State. Switzer was 16–0 during his career against the Wildcats and 14–2 against the Jayhawks.

After leaving Oklahoma, Schnellenberger decided to try the financial world and became a bond salesman, passing the certification exam on his third try.

=== Florida Atlantic University ===
After a few years out of the limelight, Schnellenberger resurfaced in 1998. At age 64 he was named director of football operations for Florida Atlantic University (FAU), with the task of building a football program from scratch: coming up with a strategic plan, raising funds and selecting a coach. He was able to raise $13 million in pledges (equivalent to $25.68 million in 2025), lobbied the state legislature, and by the time then-FAU President Anthony Catanese asked him to find a coach in 1999, Schnellenberger selected himself. Schnellenberger described his interest in FAU by noting "This one is so different. The others, we were working with adopted kids. These were our kids."

For the next two years, Schnellenberger led the fledgling team through fund-raising, recruiting and practice. For their first practice in 2000, the Owls had 160 walk-ons and 22 scholarship players. FAU football played their first game on September 1, 2001, losing to Slippery Rock 40–7 after the FAU administration failed to certify 13 Owls starters in time to play. The very next game the Owls upset the No. 22 team in I-AA, Bethune–Cookman, finishing their first season 4–6. They regressed to 2–9 the following season, but went 11–3 and made the I-AA semifinals in their third. During their fourth season, the Owls posted a 9–3 record while transitioning to Division I-A, but were ineligible for both a bowl game and the I-AA playoffs because of their transitioning status.

After playing four years at the Division I-AA level, FAU moved to the Sun Belt Conference and Division I-A level in 2005. This goal had been one of Schnellenberger's primary objectives upon creation of the program. After two seasons in the Sun Belt, FAU football won the 2007 Conference title and secured its first ever bowl invitation, defeating Memphis 44–27 in the New Orleans Bowl. In just the seventh year of the football program's history, and the third year playing in Division I-A, Florida Atlantic set an NCAA record by becoming the youngest program ever to receive an invitation to a bowl game. For his success in 2007, Schnellenberger was named Sun Belt Conference Coach of the Year.

In 2008, Schnellenberger led his 6–6 FAU Owls to a post-season bid at the Motor City Bowl against the Central Michigan Chippewas. This marked the first time a 6–6 Sun Belt Conference team that had not won the Conference Championship was invited to a post-season bowl. Although the Owls were underdogs, Schnellenberger extended his post-season bowl record to 6–0, the most of any coach without a loss, with a 24–21 win.

Schnellenberger, whose contract as head coach expired at the end of the 2011 season, announced his retirement on August 11, 2011, effective at season's end. When asked if he would consider coaching again, he replied, "You're not going to see me anywhere but here or at the beach." During his FAU career, he regularly pushed for a new on-campus football stadium; that goal was realized with the 2010 groundbreaking for the new FAU Stadium. Shortly before he announced his retirement, he was featured in a pre-opening ceremony in which he switched on the stadium lights for the first time. He led the Owls out for their first home game in the new facility on October 15.

On August 20, 2014, FAU announced that the field at its stadium would be named in honor of Howard Schnellenberger. During homecoming of 2019, Schnellenberger was inducted into the FAU Hall of Fame.

== Personal life ==
Schnellenberger married Beverlee Donnelly of Saint-Jean-sur-Richelieu, Quebec, in May 1959; they had three sons. Their oldest son Stephen was diagnosed as an infant with a rare form of endocrine cancer but lived a normal childhood and became an insurance broker in Florida; however, during a 2003 surgery, his heart stopped and he suffered brain damage that left him in a semi-comatose state. The Schnellenbergers cared for him at their home until his death on March 9, 2008.

Schnellenberger and his wife lived in Ocean Ridge, Florida. The home was described as "like a museum" in a 2017 profile for The New York Times due to displayed items from such notable figures as George H. W. Bush, Burt Reynolds, and Joe Namath.

Schnellenberger was known for his gravelly baritone voice and was known for smoking a trademark pipe, but he gave it up after he found out his son was diagnosed with cancer. During his time at Miami and Louisville, Schnellenberger was known for wearing a distinctive suede jacket and a conservative striped tie, echoing the dress of his mentors such as Bear Bryant, though he more often wore golf shirts as coach of FAU. He was also famous for his colorful press conference quips, so much so that the Louisville Eccentric Observer ran a feature called "SchnellSpeak of the Week".

Schnellenberger played the referee in the football game scene in the Robert Altman-directed 1970 war film M*A*S*H. He said of his cinematic experience, "That was hard work. I was there for two weeks. We had to wear football cleats eight hours a day."

After his retirement, Schnellenberger was retained by Florida Atlantic University (FAU) and named the first ever "Ambassador at large" his main responsibility was to help drive fundraising efforts for the athletic department. When the University of Miami and FAU met in 2013, the former coach was lauded as honorary captain for both teams.

== Death and legacy ==
Schnellenberger died on March 27, 2021, in Boca Raton, Florida, at the age of 87.

In 2023, Louisville and Miami jointly announced that the schools would compete for the new Schnellenberger Trophy for future rivalry matchups. The Louisville Sports Commission unveiled the trophy, which is a bronzed pair of Schnellenberger's famous cowboy boots.

== Head coaching record ==
=== NFL ===
| Team | Year | Regular season | | | | | Postseason |
| Team | Year | Won | Lost | Ties | Win % | Finish | Result |
|---|---|---|---|---|---|---|---|
| BAL | 1973 | 4 | 10 | 0 | .286 | 4th in AFC East | Missed playoffs |
| BAL | 1974 | 0 | 3 | 0 | .000 | 5th in AFC East | Replaced by Joe Thomas |
| Total | | 4 | 13 | 0 | .235 | | |

=== College ===
| Year | Team | Overall | Conference | Standing | Bowl/playoffs | Coaches^{#} | AP^{°} |
|---|---|---|---|---|---|---|---|
Miami Hurricanes (NCAA Division I-A independent) (1979–1983)
| 1979 | Miami | 5–6 | | | | | |
| 1980 | Miami | 9–3 | | | W Peach | 18 | 18 |
| 1981 | Miami | 9–2 | | | | | 8 |
| 1982 | Miami | 7–4 | | | | | |
| 1983 | Miami | 11–1 | | | W Orange | 1 | 1 |
| Miami: | | 41–16 | | | | | |
Louisville Cardinals (NCAA Division I-A independent) (1985–1994)
| 1985 | Louisville | 2–9 | | | | | |
| 1986 | Louisville | 3–8 | | | | | |
| 1987 | Louisville | 3–7–1 | | | | | |
| 1988 | Louisville | 8–3 | | | | | |
| 1989 | Louisville | 6–5 | | | | | |
| 1990 | Louisville | 10–1–1 | | | W Fiesta | 12 | 14 |
| 1991 | Louisville | 2–9 | | | | | |
| 1992 | Louisville | 5–6 | | | | | |
| 1993 | Louisville | 9–3 | | | W Liberty | 23 | 24 |
| 1994 | Louisville | 6–5 | | | | | |
| Louisville: | | 54–56–2 | | | | | |
Oklahoma Sooners (Big Eight Conference) (1995)
| 1995 | Oklahoma | 5–5–1 | 2–5 | 5th | | | |
| Oklahoma: | | 5–5–1 | 2–5 | | | | |
Florida Atlantic Owls (NCAA Division I-AA independent) (2001–2004)
| 2001 | Florida Atlantic | 4–6 | | | | | |
| 2002 | Florida Atlantic | 2–9 | | | | | |
| 2003 | Florida Atlantic | 11–3 | | | L NCAA Division I-AA Semifinal | | |
| 2004 | Florida Atlantic | 9–3 | | | | | |
Florida Atlantic Owls (Sun Belt Conference) (2005–2011)
| 2005 | Florida Atlantic | 2–9 | 2–5 | T–7th | | | |
| 2006 | Florida Atlantic | 5–7 | 4–3 | T–3rd | | | |
| 2007 | Florida Atlantic | 8–5 | 6–1 | T–1st | W New Orleans | | |
| 2008 | Florida Atlantic | 7–6 | 4–3 | T–3rd | W Motor City | | |
| 2009 | Florida Atlantic | 5–7 | 5–3 | T–3rd | | | |
| 2010 | Florida Atlantic | 4–8 | 3–5 | T–6th | | | |
| 2011 | Florida Atlantic | 1–11 | 0–8 | 9th | | | |
| Florida Atlantic: | | 58–74 | 22–23 | | | | |
| Total: | | 158–151–3 | | | | | |
National championship Conference title Conference division title or championship game berth
^{#}Rankings from final Coaches Poll.; ^{°}Rankings from final AP Poll.
