= David Taylor (American football) =

American football player (born 1949)

- Taylor in 1977

No. 64
- Position: Offensive tackle

Personal information
- Born: October 17, 1949 (age 77); Statesville, North Carolina, U.S.
- Listed height: 6 ft 4 in (1.93 m)
- Listed weight: 260 lb (118 kg)

Career information
- High school: Chapel Hill (Chapel Hill, North Carolina)
- College: Catawba
- NFL draft: 1973: 5th round, 114th overall pick

Career history
- Baltimore Colts (1973–1979)

Awards and highlights
- First-team Little All-American (1972)

Career NFL statistics
- Games played: 72
- Starts: 62
- Fumble recoveries: 1
- Stats at Pro Football Reference

David Merritt Taylor (born October 17, 1949) is an American former professional football player who was an offensive tackle in the National Football League (NFL). He played college football for the Catawba Indians and was selected by the Associated Press as a first-team tackle on the 1972 Little All-America college football team. He was selected by the Baltimore Colts in the fifth round of the 1973 NFL draft.

Taylor graduated from Chapel Hill High School in Chapel Hill, North Carolina.
