= Bert Jones =

American football player (born 1951)

- Jones in 1977

No. 7, 17
- Position: Quarterback

Personal information
- Born: September 7, 1951 (age 75); Ruston, Louisiana, U.S.
- Listed height: 6 ft 3 in (1.91 m)
- Listed weight: 210 lb (95 kg)

Career information
- High school: Ruston
- College: LSU
- NFL draft: 1973: 1st round, 2nd overall pick

Career history
- Baltimore Colts (1973–1981); Los Angeles Rams (1982)

Awards and highlights
- NFL Most Valuable Player (1976); NFL Offensive Player of the Year (1976); First-team All-Pro (1976); Second-team All-Pro (1977); Pro Bowl (1976); NFL passing yards leader (1976); George Halas Award (1979); Sporting News Player of the Year (1972); Consensus All-American (1972); First-team All-SEC (1972); NFL record: Most times sacked in a single game: 12 (tied with Warren Moon and Donovan McNabb)

Career NFL statistics
- Games played: 102
- Starts: 96
- Passing attempts: 2,551
- Passing completions: 1,430
- Completion percentage: 56.1%
- TD–INT: 124–101
- Passing yards: 18,190
- Passer rating: 78.2
- Stats at Pro Football Reference
- College Football Hall of Fame

Bertram Hays Jones (born September 7, 1951) is an American former professional football quarterback who played in the National Football League (NFL) for 10 seasons with the Baltimore Colts and Los Angeles Rams. He was named the NFL Most Valuable Player in 1976 with the Colts.

Jones played college football for the LSU Tigers, earning consensus All-American honors in 1972. He was selected by the Colts in the first round of the 1973 NFL draft with the second overall pick. He is the son of former NFL running back Dub Jones of the Cleveland Browns. In 2016, Jones was inducted into the College Football Hall of Fame.

== Biography ==
=== Early life ===
Bert Jones was born on September 7, 1951, in Ruston, Louisiana. His father, Dub Jones, was a halfback who played for ten years in the All-America Football Conference (AAFC) and National Football League (NFL).

He attended Ruston High School, where he was given the nickname "the Ruston Rifle".

=== College ===
Jones attended Louisiana State University (LSU) in Baton Rouge, Louisiana, where he played for the Tigers. While at LSU, Jones only started two games prior to the end of his junior year, but he started every game thereafter, leading LSU to a 12–2–1 record.

In 1971, Jones threw for 945 yards with nine touchdowns and four interceptions while splitting time with Paul Lyons. Against the wishes of LSU fans, Jones was forced to share quarterback duties with Lyons because of Jones's bickering with head coach Charlie McClendon over signal calling. Lyons himself threw for over 800 yards and 11 touchdowns that year.

In 1972 after taking over at quarterback, Jones threw for 1,446 yards with 14 touchdowns and seven interceptions on 199 pass attempts. Except for one week, LSU spent the entire season ranked in the AP Top 10. One of Jones's most famous moments came in the 1972 LSU vs. Ole Miss game, when he led LSU to a 17–16 last-second victory by hitting running back Brad Davis in the end zone for a touchdown as time expired. After the season, Jones became the first quarterback in LSU history to be awarded consensus All-America honors. Jones also finished fourth in the vote for the Heisman Trophy and was named the national collegiate Player of the Year by The Sporting News.

During his 17 games at LSU, Jones completed 52.6 percent of his passes for 3,225 yards and 28 touchdowns, which at the time was the most career passing yards and touchdowns of any quarterback in school history.

In 2016, Jones was inducted into the College Football Hall of Fame.

=== Professional career ===
Jones was projected by NFL scouts to be the first quarterback drafted in 1973. He was chosen second overall by the Baltimore Colts to be the Colts' heir apparent to Johnny Unitas, who was later traded to San Diego. His debut came on September 16, 1973, in a loss to the Cleveland Browns. During his eight-year tenure as the Colts' starting quarterback, Jones and his teammates enjoyed three consecutive AFC East division titles (1975–77). But in each of those years, the Colts lost in the first round of the playoffs. The 1977 playoff game (known as Ghost to the Post) is famous as the fifth longest game in NFL history; the Colts fell to the Oakland Raiders, 37–31. Jones missed most of 1978 and 1979 with a shoulder injury, and the Colts fell to last place in the AFC East those two seasons.

The 1976 regular season was Jones' finest as a professional; he threw for 3,104 yards and a career-high 24 touchdowns, compiling a passer rating of 102.5. He was one of only three quarterbacks to achieve a 100+ passer rating during the entire decade of the 1970s, joining Dallas' Roger Staubach (1971) and Oakland's Ken Stabler (1976). Jones was honored by the Associated Press as 1976's NFL Most Valuable Player and NFL Offensive Player of the Year, selected first-team All-Pro, and named to the Pro Bowl team. He was also selected second-team All-Pro following the 1977 season.

The remainder of Jones' playing career beyond 1977 was curtailed by several injuries, the first of which was a separated shoulder after a hit from Al Baker in the Colts' 13–7 win over the Detroit Lions at the Pontiac Silverdome on August 26, 1978, in the final preseason contest for both teams.

During an October 26, 1980 game against the St. Louis Cardinals, Jones made NFL history when he was sacked a record 12 times. This broke the record at the time held by many quarterbacks, including Jones's then back-up, Greg Landry, who had been sacked 11 times while he was a member of the Detroit Lions in a game against the Dallas Cowboys on October 6, 1975.

On the day the 1982 NFL draft began, he was traded to the Los Angeles Rams for a first- and second-round pick; those picks were used on Ohio State quarterback Art Schlichter and Florida State punter Rohn Stark. In 1982, his final season, Jones played in four games for the Rams before a neck injury forced him to retire.

In 1990, Jones participated in the first NFL Quarterback Challenge. He finished first in the retiree category and third in the regular competition (The regular competition taking the top three finishers from the alumni competition and adding them to the regular field of current quarterbacks). Given his strong performance, Bobby Beathard, then the general manager of the Chargers, wanted Jones to come out of retirement, but Jones was 38 at the time and chose not to try a comeback.

Longtime scout Ernie Accorsi is quoted as saying that if Bert Jones had played under different circumstances, he probably would have been the greatest player ever. John Riggins has been quoted as saying Jones was the toughest competitor he has ever witnessed. On the eve of Super Bowl XLII, New England Patriots head coach Bill Belichick, in discussing his choices for the greatest quarterbacks of all time, described Jones as the best "pure passer" he had ever seen.

In 2022, the Professional Football Researchers Association named Jones to the PFRA Hall of Very Good Class of 2022.

== NFL career statistics ==
Legend
	AP NFL MVP
	Led the league
**Bold**	Career high

Year	Team	Games			Passing								Rushing			
Year	Team	GP	GS	Record	Cmp	Att	Pct	Yds	Avg	TD	Int	Rtg	Att	Yds	Avg	TD
1973	BAL	8	5	1–4	43	108	39.8	539	5.0	4	12	28.8	18	58	3.2	0
1974	BAL	11	8	1–7	143	270	53.0	1,610	6.0	8	12	62.4	39	279	**7.2**	**4**
1975	BAL	14	14	10–4	203	344	59.0	2,483	7.2	18	8	89.1	**47**	**321**	6.8	3
1976	BAL	14	14	11–3	207	343	60.3	3,104	**9.0**	**24**	9	102.5	38	214	5.6	2
1977	BAL	14	14	10–4	224	393	57.0	2,686	6.8	17	11	80.8	28	146	5.2	2
1978	BAL	3	3	2–1	27	42	**64.3**	370	8.8	4	1	**114.2**	9	38	4.2	0
1979	BAL	4	4	3–1	43	92	46.7	643	7.0	3	3	67.4	10	40	4.0	1
1980	BAL	15	15	6–9	**248**	**446**	55.6	**3,134**	7.0	23	**21**	75.3	27	175	6.5	2
1981	BAL	15	15	2–13	244	426	57.3	3,094	7.3	21	20	76.9	20	85	4.3	0
1982	LAR	4	4	1–3	48	87	55.2	527	6.1	2	4	61.8	11	73	6.6	0
Career		102	96	47–49	1,430	2,551	56.1	18,190	7.1	124	101	78.2	247	1,429	5.8	14
