= List of Morningside Mustangs head football coaches =

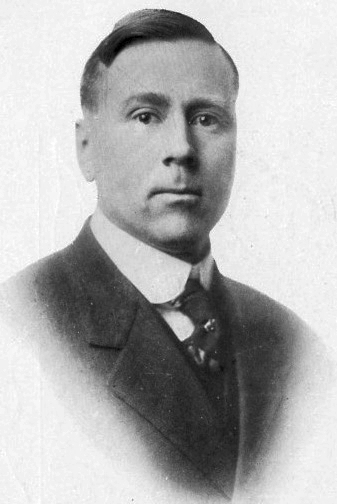
John L. Griffith was head coach at Morningside for three seasons in the early years of the program.

The Morningside Mustangs program is a college football team that represents Morningside University in the Great Plains Athletic Conference, a part of the NAIA. The team has had 23 head coaches since its first recorded football game in 1898. The current coach is Steve Ryan who first took the position for the 2002 season. The program did not field a varsity team in 2001 as the school transitioned from the National Collegiate Athletic Association (NCAA) to the National Association of Intercollegiate Athletics (NAIA).

== Key ==
Key to symbols in coaches list
General		Overall		Conference		Postseason (Note: Although the first Rose Bowl Game was played in 1902, it has been continuously played since the 1916 game, and is recognized as the oldest bowl game by the NCAA. "—" indicates any season prior to 1916 when postseason games were not played.)	
No.	Order of coaches (Note: A running total of the number of head coaches, with coaches who served separate tenures being counted only once. Interim head coaches are represented with "Int" and are not counted in the running total. "—" indicates the team played but either without a coach or no coach is on record. "X" indicates an interim year without play.)	GC	Games coached	CW	Conference wins	PW	Postseason wins
DC	Division championships	OW	Overall wins	CL	Conference losses	PL	Postseason losses
CC	Conference championships	OL	Overall losses	CT	Conference ties	PT	Postseason ties
NC	National championships	OT	Overall ties (Note: Overtime rules in college football were introduced in 1996, making ties impossible in the period since.)	C%	Conference winning percentage		
†	Elected to the College Football Hall of Fame	O%	Overall winning percentage (Note: When computing the win–loss percentage, a tie counts as half a win and half a loss.)				

== Coaches ==
No.	Name	Term	GC	OW	OL	OT	O%	CW	CL	CT	C%	PW	PL	CCs	Awards
1	Robert Van Horne	1898, 1900	6	2	3	1	.417	—	—	—	—	—	—	—	—
X	no team	1899	—	—	—	—	—	—	—	—	—	—	—	—	—
X	unknown	1901	5	2	3	0	.400	—	—	—	—	—	—	—	—
2	Charles G. Flanagan	1902	3	1	2	0	.333	—	—	—	—	—	—	—	—
3	Everett M. Sweeley	1903	8	5	3	0	.625	—	—	—	—	—	—	—	—
4	Eli F. Peckumn	1904	7	0	4	3	.214	—	—	—	—	—	—	—	—
5	John L. Griffith	1905–1907	23	13	6	4	.652	—	—	—	—	—	—	—	—
6	John W. Hollister	1908–1910	24	11	10	3	.521	—	—	—	—	—	—	—	—
7	Harry W. Ewing	1911	9	6	3	0	.667	—	—	—	—	—	—	—	—
8	Jason M. Saunderson	1912–1941	224	116	97	11	.542	—	—	—	—	—	—	—	—
9	Stafford Cassell	1942	8	2	6	0	.250	—	—	—	—	—	—	—	—
X	no team	1943–1944	—	—	—	—	—	—	—	—	—	—	—	—	—
10	Russell Hughes	1945	5	2	2	1	.500	—	—	—	—	—	—	—	—
11	Les Davis	1946–1947	17	7	9	1	.441	—	—	—	—	—	—	—	—
12	George H. Allen	1948–1950	29	16	11	2	.586	—	—	—	—	—	—	—	—
13	Clayton Droullard	1951–1954	33	16	16	1	.500	—	—	—	—	—	—	—	—
14	Dewey Halford	1955–1973	168	73	92	3	.443	—	—	—	—	—	—	—	—
15	John Dornon	1974–1976	27	4	22	1	.167	—	—	—	—	—	—	—	—
16	Steve Miller	1977–1979	29	4	23	2	.172	—	—	—	—	—	—	—	—
17	Lyle Eidsness	1980	11	3	8	0	.273	—	—	—	—	—	—	—	—
18	Tim McGuire	1981–1982	22	7	15	0	.318	—	—	—	—	—	—	—	—
19	Erv Mondt	1983–1988	66	19	46	1	.295	—	—	—	—	—	—	—	—
20	Dave Dolch	1989–1992	43	14	28	1	.337	—	—	—	—	—	—	—	—
21	Charlie Cowdrey	1993–1995	33	5	26	2	.182	—	—	—	—	—	—	—	—
22	Dave Elliott	1996–2000	55	7	48	0	.127	—	—	—	—	—	—	—	—
X	no team	2001	—	—	—	—	—	—	—	—	—	—	—	—	—
23	Steve Ryan	2002–	299	249	50	0	.833	—	—	—	—	—	—	—	—
