= Drake–Northern Iowa rivalry =

American college sports rivalry

- Drake Bulldogs Northern Iowa Panthers
- Sport: Multi-sport
- First meeting: October 3, 1900

Locations of the University of Northern Iowa
and Drake University

The Drake–Northern Iowa rivalry is the American collegiate athletics rivalry between the Bulldogs sports teams of Drake University and the Panthers sports teams of the University of Northern Iowa.

Both universities are located in the State of Iowa and are members of the Missouri Valley Conference. Drake's campus located in Des Moines and Northern Iowa's campus located in Cedar Falls are only 108 miles apart. The universities are two of the Big Four (NCAA Division I institutions in Iowa) schools, along with the University of Iowa and Iowa State University.

== Background ==
The University of Northern Iowa is a public institution founded in 1876. The Panthers joined the Missouri Valley Conference in 1991. Drake University is a private institution founded in 1881. The Bulldogs were one of the charter members of the Missouri Valley Conference. The schools have been in-state rivals since their founding; however, the rivalry intensified when the Panthers joined the Missouri Valley Conference.

== Baseball ==
Northern Iowa and Drake have played forty-eight official NCAA baseball games. Their first official intercollegiate meeting occurred in 1907; however, the teams played unofficial games dating back to 1885. Both Northern Iowa (2010) and Drake (1975) have since been re-classified from NCAA Division I to college club status.

The Panthers won the 2001 Missouri Valley Conference tournament advancing the NCAA Division I tournament regional round. The Bulldogs have not advance to the NCAA Division I tournament in the College World Series era (1947 to present).

Northern Iowa victories	Drake victories	Ties

No.	Date	Location	Winner	Score
1	May 18, 1907	Des Moines, IA	Northern Iowa	5–2
2	May 2, 1908	Des Moines, IA	Drake	10–3
3	May 30, 1908	Cedar Falls, IA	Drake	7–4
4	May 10, 1929	Des Moines, IA	Northern Iowa	5–0
5	May 12, 1929	Des Moines, IA	Northern Iowa	20–4
6	May 24, 1930	Cedar Falls, IA	Northern Iowa	7–3
7	May 25, 1930	Cedar Falls, IA	Northern Iowa	16–2
8	May 3, 1947	Des Moines, IA	Drake	3–1
9	May 4, 1947	Des Moines, IA	Northern Iowa	7–0
10	May 24, 1947	Cedar Falls, IA	Northern Iowa	11–4
11	May 25, 1947	Cedar Falls, IA	Northern Iowa	7–1
12	May 1, 1948	Des Moines, IA	Drake	5–0
13	June 5, 1948	Cedar Falls, IA	Northern Iowa	4–3
14	June 6, 1948	Cedar Falls, IA	Northern Iowa	18–5
15	June 4, 1949	Des Moines, IA	Drake	3–2
16	June 5, 1949	Des Moines, IA	Drake	4–1
17	April 29, 1950	Cedar Falls, IA	Northern Iowa	17–2
18	April 30, 1950	Cedar Falls, IA	Northern Iowa	8–1
19	May 19, 1951	Des Moines, IA	Northern Iowa	11–5
20	May 20, 1951	Des Moines, IA	Drake	6–5
21	May 26, 1951	Cedar Falls, IA	Northern Iowa	9–2
22	May 27, 1951	Cedar Falls, IA	Drake	13–12
23	May 16, 1952	Des Moines, IA	Northern Iowa	4–1
24	May 17, 1952	Des Moines, IA	Northern Iowa	2–1
25	May 18, 1952	Des Moines, IA	Northern Iowa	1–0

No.	Date	Location	Winner	Score
26	April 18, 1953	Cedar Falls, IA	Northern Iowa	9–1
27	April 19, 1953	Cedar Falls, IA	Northern Iowa	11–5
28	May 15, 1954	Des Moines, IA	Northern Iowa	5–3
29	May 16, 1954	Des Moines, IA	Drake	1–0
30	May 13, 1955	Cedar Falls, IA	Northern Iowa	2–1
31	May 14, 1955	Cedar Falls, IA	Northern Iowa	19–2
32	May 12, 1956	Des Moines, IA	Northern Iowa	10–8
33	May 13, 1956	Des Moines, IA	Northern Iowa	13–4
34	June 1, 1957	Cedar Falls, IA	Drake	3–1
35	April 18, 1959	Cedar Falls, IA	Northern Iowa	12–5
36	April 19, 1959	Cedar Falls, IA	Northern Iowa	15–2
37	May 7, 1960	Des Moines, IA	Northern Iowa	6–5
38	May 8, 1960	Des Moines, IA	Northern Iowa	9–0
39	April 8, 1961	Cedar Falls, IA	Northern Iowa	11–0
40	April 9, 1961	Cedar Falls, IA	Northern Iowa	15–1
41	April 7, 1962	Des Moines, IA	Northern Iowa	10–3
42	April 8, 1962	Des Moines, IA	Drake	4–1
43	April 6, 1963	Cedar Falls, IA	Drake	12–7
44	April 7, 1963	Cedar Falls, IA	Northern Iowa	4–1
45	April 18, 1964	Des Moines, IA	Northern Iowa	11–2
46	April 17, 1965	Cedar Falls, IA	Northern Iowa	4–1
47	May 14, 1966	Des Moines, IA	Drake	10–3
48	May 18, 1968	Des Moines, IA	Northern Iowa	23–10
Series: Northern Iowa leads 35–13

== Men's Basketball ==
The Panthers and Bulldogs first played in men's basketball in 1908; however, they only played six games prior to the 1980s. Northern Iowa upset top seed Kansas advancing to the NCAA Division I Sweet Sixteen in 2010. Drake appeared in the 1969 NCAA Division I Final Four (narrowly falling to UCLA) and has appeared in three NCAA Division I Elite Eights. They have combined for thirteen Missouri Valley Conference regular season championships (Northern Iowa 3, Drake 10) and seven Missouri Valley Conference tournament championships (Northern Iowa 5, Drake 2). The Panthers also won the 1990 Mid-Continent Conference tournament.

In 2019 Northern Iowa upset the number two seed co-regular season champion Drake in the Missouri Valley Conference tournament semifinals. The Bulldogs returned the favor in 2020 upsetting the number one seed Panthers in the Missouri Valley Conference tournament quarterfinals becoming the first eight or lower seed to defeat a one seed. The teams would have played again in the 2021 Missouri Valley Conference quarterfinal; however, the game was canceled due to COVID-19 issues within the Northern Iowa program causing Drake to advance in a walkover. They also met in the earlier rounds of the Missouri Valley Conference tournament on four occasions, splitting those games.

Northern Iowa victories	Drake victories	Ties

No.	Date	Location	Winner	Score
1	March 2, 1908	Cedar Falls, IA	Northern Iowa	53–27
2	January 17, 1914	Des Moines, IA	Drake	24–12
3	February 26, 1914	Cedar Falls, IA	Northern Iowa	37–12
4	January 15, 1915	Des Moines, IA	Drake	21–16
5	December 7, 1945	Des Moines, IA	Drake	36–33
6	December 6, 1947	Cedar Falls, IA	Drake	58–49
7	December 26, 1981	Des Moines, IA	Drake	62–58
8	December 18, 1982	Des Moines, IA	Drake	73–65
9	December 6, 1983	Cedar Falls, IA	Northern Iowa	67–55
10	December 19, 1986	Des Moines, IA	Drake	86–52
11	December 12, 1987	Des Moines, IA	Drake	88–77
12	February 7, 1989	Cedar Falls, IA	Northern Iowa	87–72
13	December 2, 1989	Des Moines, IA	Northern Iowa	71–63 ^{OT}
14	February 6, 1991	Cedar Falls, IA	Northern Iowa	83–67
15	January 6, 1992	Des Moines, IA	Northern Iowa	56–51
16	February 15, 1992	Cedar Falls, IA	Northern Iowa	96–84
17	February 4, 1993	Cedar Falls, IA	Drake	69–59
18	February 20, 1993	Des Moines, IA	Northern Iowa	64–62 ^{OT}
19	March 6, 1993	Saint Louis, MO	Drake	63–59
20	December 12, 1993	Cedar Falls, IA	Northern Iowa	71–54
21	February 12, 1994	Des Moines, IA	Northern Iowa	102–79
22	January 8, 1995	Cedar Falls, IA	Drake	78–67
23	February 25, 1995	Des Moines, IA	Drake	82–71
24	January 21, 1996	Cedar Falls, IA	Northern Iowa	82–76
25	February 24, 1996	Des Moines, IA	Northern Iowa	83–66
26	January 25, 1997	Des Moines, IA	Northern Iowa	81–68
27	February 22, 1997	Cedar Falls, IA	Northern Iowa	76–55
28	January 12, 1998	Cedar Falls, IA	Northern Iowa	74–60
29	February 14, 1998	Des Moines, IA	Northern Iowa	68–55
30	January 24, 1999	Des Moines, IA	Drake	78–72
31	February 22, 1999	Cedar Falls, IA	Northern Iowa	83–57
32	January 9, 2000	Des Moines, IA	Drake	58–54
33	February 26, 2000	Cedar Falls, IA	Northern Iowa	56–54
34	March 3, 2000	Saint Louis, MO	Drake	58–57
35	January 20, 2001	Des Moines, IA	Drake	65–63
36	February 10, 2001	Cedar Falls, IA	Northern Iowa	71–65 ^{OT}
37	March 2, 2001	Saint Louis, MO	Northern Iowa	59–53
38	January 2, 2002	Cedar Falls, IA	Northern Iowa	71–56
39	January 20, 2002	Des Moines, IA	Northern Iowa	77–71
40	January 12, 2003	Des Moines, IA	Drake	75–73
41	March 1, 2003	Cedar Falls, IA	Northern Iowa	59–48
42	January 17, 2004	Cedar Falls, IA	Northern Iowa	76–56
43	February 25, 2004	Des Moines, IA	Northern Iowa	84–79 ^{OT}
44	January 29, 2005	Des Moines, IA	Drake	81–72
45	February 16, 2005	Cedar Falls, IA	Northern Iowa	61–60
46	January 21, 2006	Cedar Falls, IA	Northern Iowa	91–72

No.	Date	Location	Winner	Score
47	January 28, 2006	Des Moines, IA	Northern Iowa	51–49
48	January 27, 2007	Des Moines, IA	Drake	74–61
49	February 8, 2007	Cedar Falls, IA	Drake	67–59
50	January 26, 2008	Des Moines, IA	Drake	58–54
51	February 16, 2008	Cedar Falls, IA	Drake	65–55
52	January 17, 2009	Des Moines, IA	Northern Iowa	81–59
53	February 18, 2009	Cedar Falls, IA	Drake	47–46
54	January 27, 2010	Cedar Falls, IA	Northern Iowa	67–51
55	February 10, 2010	Des Moines, IA	Northern Iowa	57–48
56	March 5, 2010	Saint Louis, MO	Northern Iowa	55–40
57	January 22, 2011	Cedar Falls, IA	Northern Iowa	69–49
58	February 5, 2011	Des Moines, IA	Drake	72–69
59	January 7, 2012	Des Moines, IA	Northern Iowa	83–68
60	January 22, 2012	Cedar Falls, IA	Northern Iowa	66–52
61	January 20, 2013	Cedar Falls, IA	Northern Iowa	85–55
62	February 16, 2013	Des Moines, IA	Northern Iowa	71–64
63	January 11, 2014	Cedar Falls, IA	Northern Iowa	76–66
64	February 18, 2014	Des Moines, IA	Drake	70–67
65	January 10, 2015	Des Moines, IA	Northern Iowa	64–40
66	February 7, 2015	Cedar Falls, IA	Northern Iowa	69–53
67	January 9, 2016	Cedar Falls, IA	Northern Iowa	77–44
68	February 6, 2016	Des Moines, IA	Northern Iowa	82–66
69	January 15, 2017	Cedar Falls, IA	Northern Iowa	79–60
70	January 28, 2017	Des Moines, IA	Northern Iowa	71–63
71	January 16, 2018	Cedar Falls, IA	Northern Iowa	68–54
72	February 10, 2018	Des Moines, IA	Drake	71–64
73	January 13, 2019	Cedar Falls, IA	Northern Iowa	57–54
74	February 9, 2019	Des Moines, IA	Drake	83–77
75	March 9, 2019	Saint Louis, MO	Northern Iowa	60–58
76	February 8, 2020	Cedar Falls, IA	Northern Iowa	83–73
77	February 29, 2020	Des Moines, IA	Northern Iowa	70–43
78	March 6, 2020	Saint Louis, MO	Drake	77–56
79	February 10, 2021	Des Moines, IA	Drake	80–59
80	February 17, 2021	Cedar Falls, IA	Drake	77–69
81	January 22, 2022	Cedar Falls, IA	Drake	82–74 ^{OT}
82	February 5, 2022	Des Moines, IA	Northern Iowa	74–69 ^{OT}
83	February 1, 2023	Des Moines, IA	Drake	88–81 ^{2OT}
84	February 15, 2023	Cedar Falls, IA	Drake	82–74
85	January 27, 2024	Des Moines, IA	Drake	77–63
86	February 24, 2024	Cedar Falls, IA	Northern Iowa	91–77
87	January 29, 2025	Des Moines, IA	Drake	66–52
88	February 23, 2025	Cedar Falls, IA	Drake	64–58 ^{OT}
89	February 15, 2026	Cedar Falls, IA	Northern Iowa	86–62
90	March 1, 2026	Des Moines, IA	Northern Iowa	75–53
Series: Northern Iowa leads 54–36

°The 2021 Missouri Valley Conference Tournament game scheduled for March 5 in Saint Louis was canceled due to a COVID-19 issue within the Northern Iowa program. Drake advanced to the semifinals in a walkover.

== Women's Basketball ==
Northern Iowa and Drake's first official basketball game was in 1975. They had met informally prior to 1975 and the formation of their intercollegiate women's basketball teams. Northern Iowa has not advanced past the NCAA Division I first round. Drake advanced to the 1982 NCAA Division I Elite Eight and the NCAA Division I Sweet Sixteen twice. The Panthers and Bulldogs combine for ten Missouri Valley Conference regular season championships (Northern Iowa 3, Drake 7) and ten Missouri Valley Conference tournament championships (Northern Iowa 2, Drake 8). The Bulldogs also won the 1984 Gateway Division.

The teams met in the 2017 and 2018 Missouri Valley Tournament championship with Drake prevailing on both occasions; however, Northern Iowa defeated Drake in the 2016 Women's National Invitational Tournament. They also met three times in the earlier rounds of the Missouri Valley Conference tournament with the Bulldogs winning all three of the games.

Northern Iowa victories	Drake victories	Ties

No.	Date	Location	Winner	Score
1	December 3, 1975	Cedar Falls, IA	Northern Iowa	84–39
2	December 13, 1976	Des Moines, IA	Drake	76–54
3	February 3, 1978	Des Moines, IA	Drake	77–44
4	February 17, 1978	Cedar Falls, IA	Drake	66–45
5	February 23, 1978	Des Moines, IA	Drake	93–67
6	November 30, 1978	Cedar Falls, IA	Drake	77–58
7	February 12, 1979	Des Moines, IA	Drake	92–60
8	February 22, 1979	Des Moines, IA	Drake	107–43
9	December 15, 1979	Des Moines, IA	Drake	77–53
10	November 22, 1980	Des Moines, IA	Drake	91–63
11	January 27, 1984	Des Moines, IA	Drake	85–41
12	February 24, 1984	Cedar Falls, IA	Drake	88–68
13	January 11, 1985	Cedar Falls, IA	Northern Iowa	80–79
14	February 8, 1985	Des Moines, IA	Drake	114–81
15	January 18, 1986	Cedar Falls, IA	Drake	86–76
16	February 15, 1986	Des Moines, IA	Drake	97–60
17	December 30, 1986	Cedar Falls, IA	Northern Iowa	64–61
18	February 28, 1987	Des Moines, IA	Drake	90–61
19	January 23, 1988	Des Moines, IA	Drake	77–53
20	February 20, 1988	Cedar Falls, IA	Drake	67–52
21	January 21, 1989	Des Moines, IA	Drake	108–72
22	February 18, 1989	Cedar Falls, IA	Drake	70–61
23	January 6, 1990	Cedar Falls, IA	Drake	77–69
24	February 3, 1990	Des Moines, IA	Drake	60–56 ^{OT}
25	January 12, 1991	Des Moines, IA	Drake	81–66
26	February 9, 1991	Cedar Falls, IA	Drake	68–47
27	January 4, 1992	Cedar Falls, IA	Drake	72–58
28	March 7, 1992	Des Moines, IA	Drake	69–59
29	January 23, 1993	Des Moines, IA	Drake	112–106 ^{4OT}
30	February 6, 1993	Cedar Falls, IA	Drake	78–71 ^{OT}
31	January 27, 1994	Cedar Falls, IA	Drake	80–50
32	February 26, 1994	Des Moines, IA	Drake	80–64
33	January 9, 1995	Des Moines, IA	Drake	88–61
34	February 2, 1995	Cedar Falls, IA	Drake	81–62
35	February 8, 1996	Cedar Falls, IA	Northern Iowa	91–88
36	February 20, 1996	Des Moines, IA	Drake	77–67
37	January 5, 1997	Des Moines, IA	Drake	90–74
38	February 1, 1997	Cedar Falls, IA	Drake	78–73
39	December 30, 1997	Des Moines, IA	Drake	99–79
40	February 28, 1998	Cedar Falls, IA	Drake	89–59
41	January 14, 1999	Cedar Falls, IA	Northern Iowa	84–73
42	February 21, 1999	Des Moines, IA	Drake	81–69
43	January 2, 2000	Des Moines, IA	Drake	78–69
44	March 4, 2000	Cedar Falls, IA	Drake	87–46
45	March 10, 2000	Springfield, MO	Drake	87–65
46	January 28, 2001	Cedar Falls, IA	Drake	91–69
47	February 24, 2001	Des Moines, IA	Drake	91–69
48	January 19, 2002	Des Moines, IA	Northern Iowa	81–66
49	February 17, 2002	Cedar Falls, IA	Drake	70–58
50	January 1, 2003	Des Moines, IA	Drake	62–51
51	March 6, 2003	Cedar Falls, IA	Northern Iowa	53–50
52	January 22, 2004	Des Moines, IA	Drake	65–58

No.	Date	Location	Winner	Score
53	February 22, 2004	Cedar Falls, IA	Drake	59–53
54	March 13, 2004	Springfield, MO	Drake	66–54
55	January 30, 2005	Des Moines, IA	Northern Iowa	68–54
56	February 24, 2005	Cedar Falls, IA	Northern Iowa	66–48
57	December 31, 2005	Cedar Falls, IA	Northern Iowa	69–46
58	March 2, 2006	Des Moines, IA	Drake	60–58
59	January 6, 2007	Des Moines, IA	Northern Iowa	61–55
60	February 1, 2007	Cedar Falls, IA	Northern Iowa	73–68
61	January 27, 2008	Des Moines, IA	Drake	66–63
62	February 24, 2008	Cedar Falls, IA	Northern Iowa	72–70
63	January 25, 2009	Des Moines, IA	Drake	70–60
64	February 19, 2009	Cedar Falls, IA	Northern Iowa	60–58
65	March 13, 2009	Saint Charles, MO	Drake	68–57
66	January 22, 2010	Des Moines, IA	Northern Iowa	59–46
67	February 18, 2010	Cedar Falls, IA	Northern Iowa	62–43
68	January 15, 2011	Des Moines, IA	Northern Iowa	89–51
69	February 12, 2011	Cedar Falls, IA	Northern Iowa	74–55
70	January 29, 2012	Des Moines, IA	Northern Iowa	82–77 ^{OT}
71	February 26, 2012	Des Moines, IA	Northern Iowa	68–66
72	January 27, 2013	Des Moines, IA	Drake	63–55
73	February 2, 2013	Cedar Falls, IA	Drake	82–67
74	February 4, 2014	Cedar Falls, IA	Drake	66–64
75	March 2, 2014	Des Moines, IA	Northern Iowa	99–97 ^{OT}
76	January 16, 2015	Cedar Falls, IA	Drake	76–72
77	February 13, 2015	Des Moines, IA	Drake	87–67
78	January 24, 2016	Des Moines, IA	Northern Iowa	79–73
79	February 19, 2016	Cedar Falls, IA	Northern Iowa	85–74
80	March 19, 2016	Cedar Falls, IA	Northern Iowa	64–58
81	January 17, 2017	Cedar Falls, IA	Drake	88–79 ^{2OT}
82	February 24, 2017	Des Moines, IA	Drake	70–57
83	March 12, 2017	Moline, IL	Drake	74–69 ^{OT}
84	January 19, 2018	Des Moines, IA	Drake	81–64
85	February 16, 2018	Cedar Falls, IA	Drake	72–67
86	March 11, 2018	Moline, IL	Drake	75–63
87	January 18, 2019	Cedar Falls, IA	Drake	88–64
88	February 15, 2019	Des Moines, IA	Drake	76–61
89	January 3, 2020	Des Moines, IA	Drake	104–87
90	March 6, 2020	Cedar Falls, IA	Northern Iowa	91–78
91	January 27, 2021	Des Moines, IA	Drake	96–79
92	February 24, 2021	Cedar Falls, IA	Drake	77–56
93	January 21, 2022	Des Moines, IA	Drake	65–57
94	February 19, 2022	Cedar Falls, IA	Drake	73–68
95	March 21, 2022	Des Moines, IA	Drake	62–55
96	January 11, 2023	Des Moines, IA	Northern Iowa	70–69
97	February 1, 2023	Cedar Falls, IA	Northern Iowa	45–43
98	February 3, 2024	Cedar Falls, IA	Drake	79–71
99	February 25, 2024	Des Moines, IA	Drake	79–77
100	February 1, 2025	Des Moines, IA	Drake	69–63
101	March 1, 2025	Cedar Falls, IA	Drake	80–79
102	February 1, 2026	Des Moines, IA	Northern Iowa	66–56
103	March 8, 2026	Cedar Falls, IA	Northern Iowa	65–58
Series: Drake leads 74–29

== Cross Country ==
Northern Iowa and Drake compete at the NCAA Division I level in men's and women's cross country. The Panther and Bulldog men's and women's teams have traditionally competed in NCAA Division I regionals and at the NCAA Division I championships. The men have won sixteen Missouri Valley Conference team championships (Northern Iowa 4, Drake 12) and women have won four Missouri Valley Conference team championships (Northern Iowa 2, Drake 2). Drake won the 1944, 1945, and 1946 NCAA Division I national cross country team championships.

Each school normally attends the other institutions home meet when held. The Panther Invitationals are hosted at Pheasant Ridge Golf Course in Cedar Falls, Iowa and the Drake Classic is hosted at Ewing Park in Des Moines, Iowa. They also compete against each other in Big Four Duels and other meets throughout the season.

== Football ==
The Missouri Valley Conference has not officially sanctioned football since 1985. Football was discontinued by the conference due to the attendance and financial requirements to maintain “major” or "I-A" or “FBS” conference status. As a result, Northern Iowa joined the Gateway Football Conference (now known as the Missouri Valley Football Conference) and Drake joined the Pioneer Football League. The Missouri Valley Football Conference league offices are still connected to the Missouri Valley Conference office in Saint Louis, Missouri.

Northern Iowa (33) and Drake (13) have combined for 46 football conference championships. The Panthers played in the 2005 FCS National Championship. The Bulldogs were undefeated in major college football in 1922. Northern Iowa and Drake first met on the gridiron in 1900. The teams are scheduled to meet September 12, 2026, in Cedar Falls.

Northern Iowa victories	Drake victories	Ties

No.	Date	Location	Winner	Score
1	October 3, 1900	Des Moines, IA	Drake	50–0
2	October 19, 1901	Cedar Falls, IA	Drake	33–2
3	October 25, 1902	Des Moines, IA	Drake	36–5
4	November 18, 1904	Des Moines, IA	Drake	26–6
5	November 15, 1913	Des Moines, IA	Drake	25–0
6	November 12, 1914	Des Moines, IA	Drake	14–3
7	November 8, 1941	Des Moines, IA	Drake	13–0
8	November 7, 1942	Cedar Falls, IA	Northern Iowa	27–12
9	November 10, 1945	Des Moines, IA	Drake	53–6
10	November 16, 1946	Cedar Falls, IA	Northern Iowa	46–0
11	November 1, 1947	Des Moines, IA	Tie	6–6
12	October 2, 1948	Cedar Falls, IA	Northern Iowa	6–0
13	October 14, 1950	Cedar Falls, IA	Drake	34–18
14	October 6, 1951	Des Moines, IA	Drake	39–6
15	September 20, 1952	Cedar Falls, IA	Drake	14–12
16	November 13, 1953	Des Moines, IA	Drake	27–20
17	October 9, 1954	Cedar Falls, IA	Drake	14–12
18	September 30, 1955	Des Moines, IA	Northern Iowa	21–14
19	September 29, 1956	Cedar Falls, IA	Northern Iowa	20–0
20	September 14, 1957	Des Moines, IA	Drake	34–12
21	October 4, 1958	Cedar Falls, IA	Northern Iowa	20–16
22	October 2, 1959	Des Moines, IA	Northern Iowa	14–6
23	October 1, 1960	Cedar Falls, IA	Northern Iowa	14–3
24	October 7, 1961	Des Moines, IA	Drake	21–6
25	October 13, 1962	Cedar Falls, IA	Drake	21–15

No.	Date	Location	Winner	Score
26	October 12, 1963	Des Moines, IA	Drake	21–12
27	October 10, 1964	Cedar Falls, IA	Northern Iowa	41–14
28	October 9, 1965	Des Moines, IA	Drake	31–7
29	September 24, 1966	Cedar Falls, IA	Drake	9–6
30	October 14, 1967	Des Moines, IA	Drake	10–7
31	October 12, 1968	Cedar Falls, IA	Northern Iowa	21–19
32	October 11, 1969	Des Moines, IA	Northern Iowa	23–13
33	October 10, 1970	Cedar Falls, IA	Northern Iowa	13–10
34	October 9, 1971	Des Moines, IA	Drake	28–0
35	October 14, 1972	Cedar Falls, IA	Drake	21–14
36	October 13, 1973	Des Moines, IA	Northern Iowa	31–3
37	October 12, 1974	Cedar Falls, IA	Northern Iowa	41–17
38	October 11, 1975	Des Moines, IA	Northern Iowa	27–24
39	September 5, 1981	Cedar Falls, IA	Drake	39–30
40	September 4, 1982	Des Moines, IA	Drake	40–13
41	September 3, 1983	Cedar Falls, IA	Northern Iowa	34–10
42	September 8, 1984	Des Moines, IA	Northern Iowa	33–28
43	September 7, 1985	Des Moines, IA	Drake	24–9
44	September 1, 2005	Cedar Falls, IA	Northern Iowa	52–17
45	August 31, 2006	Des Moines, IA	Northern Iowa	48–7
46	September 22, 2007	Des Moines, IA	Northern Iowa	45–7
47	September 7, 2013	Cedar Falls, IA	Northern Iowa	45–14
48	September 12, 2026	Cedar Falls, IA	Northern Iowa	56–14
Series: Drake leads 25–22–1

== Golf ==
Northern Iowa and Drake compete at the NCAA Division I level in men's and women's golf. The Panther and Bulldog men's and women's teams have traditionally competed in NCAA Division I regionals and at the NCAA Division I championship. The Northern Iowa men, Panther women, and Bulldog women have not yet won a Missouri Valley Conference team championship. The Drake men have won five Missouri Valley Conference team championships.

The Panthers usually attend the Zach Johnson Invitational held at Glen Oaks Country Club while the Bulldogs normally attend the UNI Invitational held at Pheasant Ridge Golf Course. They also compete against each other in Big Four Duels and other meets throughout the season.

== Rowing ==
The Drake women are currently the only team classified as an NCAA Division I rowing program. The Northern Iowa men and women, along with the Drake men, are currently classified as college club status.

Rowing is the oldest intercollegiate sport in the United States dating back to 1852 (prior to each institutions founding). The Panther and Bulldog men and women teams have transitioned in-between classification dating back to 1876 (Northern Iowa) and 1881 (Drake). The teams have competed against each other when in a similar classification.

== Men's Soccer ==
Northern Iowa has not competed at the NCAA Division I level in men's soccer. Drake has fielded an NCAA Division I men's soccer team since 1986. The Bulldogs advanced to the 2009 NCAA Division I Elite Eight and have won two Missouri Valley Conference tournament championships. Prior to 1986 the two teams competed against each other under the college club status.

== Women's Soccer ==
Northern Iowa and Drake's first official NCAA Division I women's soccer game was in 2002. Northern Iowa sanctioned women's soccer in 2000 and Drake sanction women's soccer in 2002. Prior to 2000 they competed against each other under the college club status. The Panthers have never advanced to the NCAA Division I tournament, while the Bulldogs have not advanced past the NCAA Division I tournament first round. Northern Iowa has not won a Missouri Valley Conference title. Drake has won six Missouri Valley Conference regular season championships and one Missouri Valley Conference tournament championship. The 2020 match was postponed to April 7, 2021, due to the COVID-19 pandemic.

The teams have split the two Missouri Valley Conference tournament matches played. Northern Iowa won in 2017 and Drake won in 2021.

Northern Iowa victories	Drake victories	Ties

No.	Date	Location	Winner	Score
1	November 11, 2002	Des Moines, IA	Northern Iowa	2–1
2	October 24, 2003	Cedar Falls, IA	Northern Iowa	2–1
3	October 17, 2004	Des Moines, IA	Drake	3–0
4	October 2, 2005	Des Moines, IA	Drake	4–0
5	October 8, 2006	Cedar Falls, IA	Drake	3–0
6	October 14, 2007	Des Moines, IA	Drake	5–0
7	October 1, 2008	Cedar Falls, IA	Drake	3–1
8	October 8, 2009	Des Moines, IA	Drake	2–1
9	October 28, 2010	Cedar Falls, IA	Drake	2–0
10	October 27, 2011	Des Moines, IA	Drake	1–0
11	September 27, 2012	Cedar Falls, IA	Tie	1–1
12	October 13, 2013	Des Moines, IA	Northern Iowa	1–0
13	October 4, 2014	Cedar Falls, IA	Tie	2–2
14	October 21, 2015	Des Moines, IA	Tie	1–1

No.	Date	Location	Winner	Score
15	October 11, 2016	Cedar Falls, IA	Tie	0–0
16	October 11, 2017	Des Moines, IA	Drake	2–1
17	November 3, 2017	Springfield, MO	Northern Iowa	2–0
18	October 17, 2018	Cedar Falls, IA	Drake	2–1
19	October 16, 2019	Des Moines, IA	Drake	2–0
20	April 7, 2021 ^{(2020)}	Cedar Falls, IA	Northern Iowa	1–0
21	October 28, 2021	Des Moines, IA	Drake	2–0
22	October 31, 2021	Waterloo, IA	Drake	3–2 ^{OT}
23	October 6, 2022	Cedar Falls, IA	Tie	1–1
24	September 17, 2023	Des Moines, IA	Drake	2–1
25	October 20, 2024	Cedar Falls, IA	Drake	2–1
26	October 18, 2025	Des Moines, IA	Drake	1–0
Series: Drake leads 16–5–5

== Softball ==
Northern Iowa and Drake's first official softball game was in 1976. They had met informally prior to the formation of their intercollegiate softball teams. Northern Iowa won the 1977 and 1982 AIAW College World Series (pre-NCAA Division I era). Both Northern Iowa and Drake have advanced in the NCAA Division I regional rounds. The Panthers and Bulldogs combine for six Missouri Valley Conference regular season championships (Northern Iowa 3, Drake 3) and six Missouri Valley Conference tournament championships (Northern Iowa 2, Drake 4).

The teams have split their four meetings in the Missouri Valley Conference tournament. The Panthers and Bulldogs met on six occasions in the AIAW regional rounds (pre-NCAA Division I) with Drake holding a 4 win to 2 win advantage.

Northern Iowa victories	Drake victories	Ties

No.	Date	Location	Winner	Score
1	May 22, 1976	Cedar Falls, IA	Northern Iowa	11–0
2	April 22, 1978	Des Moines, IA	Northern Iowa	13–3
3	April 23, 1978	Des Moines, IA	Northern Iowa	10–3
4	March 31, 1979	Cedar Falls, IA	Northern Iowa	1–0 ^{9 innings}
5	April 1, 1979	Cedar Falls, IA	Northern Iowa	5–1
6	May 26, 1979	Des Moines, IA	Drake	1–0 ^{12 innings}
7	May 28, 1979	Des Moines, IA	Drake	2–1
8	May 3, 1980	Des Moines, IA	Northern Iowa	6–3
9	May 4, 1980	Des Moines, IA	Drake	4–2
10	May 24, 1980	Cedar Falls, IA	Drake	5–1
11	May 16, 1981	Des Moines, IA	Northern Iowa	2–1
12	May 17, 1981	Des Moines, IA	Drake	5–1
13	April 9, 1983	Cedar Falls, IA	Northern Iowa	1–0
14	April 10, 1983	Cedar Falls, IA	Northern Iowa	2–1
15	March 30, 1985	Des Moines, IA	Drake	3–2 ^{9 innings}
16	March 31, 1985	Des Moines, IA	Drake	6–4
17	April 14, 1985	Cedar Falls, IA	Northern Iowa	3–0
18	March 15, 1986	Normal, IL	Drake	4–3 ^{11 innings}
19	April 12, 1986	Cedar Falls, IA	Drake	2–0
20	April 13, 1986	Cedar Falls, IA	Northern Iowa	4–0
21	May 15, 1986	Peoria, IL	Northern Iowa	1–0
22	April 18, 1987	Des Moines, IA	Northern Iowa	8–0
23	April 19, 1987	Des Moines, IA	Northern Iowa	16–1
24	February 7, 1988	Cedar Falls, IA	Northern Iowa	8–0
25	April 16, 1988	Cedar Falls, IA	Northern Iowa	5–0
26	April 17, 1988	Cedar Falls, IA	Northern Iowa	2–0
27	May 7, 1988	Springfield, MO	Northern Iowa	2–1
28	February 3, 1989	Cedar Falls, IA	Northern Iowa	3–1
29	March 11, 1989	Chicago, IL	Northern Iowa	6–0
30	March 25, 1989	Des Moines, IA	Northern Iowa	4–3
31	March 26, 1989	Des Moines, IA	Northern Iowa	5–2
32	February 3, 1990	Cedar Falls, IA	Drake	1–0 ^{8 innings}
33	April 7, 1990	Cedar Falls, IA	Drake	2–1
34	April 8, 1990	Cedar Falls, IA	Drake	7–1
35	May 13, 1990	Carbondale, IL	Northern Iowa	2–0
36	February 9, 1991	Cedar Falls, IA	Drake	6–0
37	March 29, 1991	Des Moines, IA	Northern Iowa	7–4
38	March 30, 1991	Des Moines, IA	Northern Iowa	10–0
39	March 31, 1991	Des Moines, IA	Northern Iowa	7–0
40	April 17, 1991	Cedar Falls, IA	Drake	4–0 ^{8 innings}
41	April 24, 1991	Cedar Falls, IA	Drake	4–2
42	May 9, 1991	Wichita, KS	Drake	4–2
43	May 2, 1992	Des Moines, IA	Drake	3–2 ^{11 innings}
44	May 3, 1992	Cedar Falls, IA	Northern Iowa	5–2
45	May 1, 1993	Cedar Falls, IA	Northern Iowa	4–3
46	May 2, 1993	Des Moines, IA	Drake	1–0
47	April 23, 1994	Cedar Falls, IA	Northern Iowa	2–0
48	April 24, 1994	Des Moines, IA	Northern Iowa	8–1
49	May 14, 1994	Springfield, MO	Drake	5–4
50	February 3, 1995	Cedar Falls, IA	Drake	8–1
51	April 22, 1995	Des Moines, IA	Drake	5–0
52	April 23, 1995	Cedar Falls, IA	Northern Iowa	6–5
53	March 2, 1996	Springfield, MO	Drake	3–2 ^{8 innings}
54	May 4, 1996	Cedar Falls, IA	Drake	6–0
55	May 5, 1996	Des Moines, IA	Northern Iowa	4–3
56	March 1, 1997	Springfield, MO	Northern Iowa	4–3
57	March 29, 1997	Macomb, IL	Northern Iowa	4–0
58	April 12, 1997	Des Moines, IA	Drake	2–0
59	April 13, 1997	Cedar Falls, IA	Northern Iowa	3–0
60	April 11, 1998	Cedar Falls, IA	Northern Iowa	6–5
61	April 12, 1998	Des Moines, IA	Northern Iowa	2–1
62	May 1, 1999	Des Moines, IA	Northern Iowa	7–4
63	May 2, 1999	Cedar Falls, IA	Northern Iowa	4–3
64	April 15, 2000	Cedar Falls, IA	Drake	3–1
65	April 16, 2000	Des Moines, IA	Northern Iowa	5–3
66	February 12, 2001	Monroe, LA	Northern Iowa	1–0
67	April 14, 2001 (1)	Des Moines, IA	Northern Iowa	3–2
68	April 14, 2001 (2)	Des Moines, IA	Northern Iowa	5–4
69	April 15, 2001	Des Moines, IA	Northern Iowa	5–0
70	February 10, 2002	Tucson, AZ	Northern Iowa	7–5
71	April 6, 2002 (1)	Cedar Falls, IA	Northern Iowa	9–0
72	April 6, 2002 (2)	Cedar Falls, IA	Drake	8–4
73	April 7, 2002	Cedar Falls, IA	Northern Iowa	9–6

No.	Date	Location	Winner	Score
74	February 8, 2003	Minneapolis, MN	Drake	3–2
75	March 29, 2003 (1)	Des Moines, IA	Drake	2–1
76	March 29, 2003 (2)	Des Moines, IA	Northern Iowa	2–0
77	March 30, 2003	Des Moines, IA	Northern Iowa	3–0
78	May 8, 2004 (1)	Cedar Falls, IA	Drake	3–1
79	May 8, 2004 (2)	Cedar Falls, IA	Drake	7–3
80	May 9, 2004	Cedar Falls, IA	Northern Iowa	9–8
81	May 7, 2005 (1)	Des Moines, IA	Drake	5–1
82	May 7, 2005 (2)	Des Moines, IA	Drake	3–0
83	May 8, 2005	Des Moines, IA	Northern Iowa	7–3
84	April 15, 2006 (1)	Cedar Falls, IA	Drake	3–2
85	April 15, 2006 (2)	Cedar Falls, IA	Drake	3–2
86	April 16, 2006	Cedar Falls, IA	Northern Iowa	8–5
87	February 11, 2007	Cedar Falls, IA	Northern Iowa	13–4
88	March 24, 2007 (1)	Des Moines, IA	Northern Iowa	5–2
89	March 24, 2007 (2)	Des Moines, IA	Drake	6–4
90	March 25, 2007	Des Moines, IA	Drake	8–2
91	April 5, 2008 (1)	Cedar Falls, IA	Drake	15–7
92	April 5, 2008 (2)	Cedar Falls, IA	Drake	10–1
93	April 6, 2008	Cedar Falls, IA	Drake	11–10
94	February 14, 2009	Minneapolis, MN	Northern Iowa	3–2 ^{8 innings}
95	May 2, 2009 (1)	Des Moines, IA	Northern Iowa	9–1
96	May 2, 2009 (2)	Des Moines, IA	Northern Iowa	2–1 ^{8 innings}
97	May 3, 2009	Des Moines, IA	Drake	2–1 ^{10 innings}
98	April 10, 2010 (1)	Cedar Falls, IA	Drake	3–1
99	April 10, 2010 (2)	Cedar Falls, IA	Drake	5–1
100	April 11, 2010	Cedar Falls, IA	Northern Iowa	1–0 ^{10 innings}
101	April 16, 2011 (1)	Des Moines, IA	Drake	3–2
102	April 16, 2011 (2)	Des Moines, IA	Drake	3–2
103	April 17, 2011	Des Moines, IA	Drake	7–0
104	April 6, 2012 (1)	Cedar Falls, IA	Northern Iowa	3–2
105	April 6, 2012 (2)	Cedar Falls, IA	Northern Iowa	5–1
106	April 7, 2012	Cedar Falls, IA	Northern Iowa	11–2
107	February 10, 2013	Cedar Falls, IA	Drake	6–0
108	April 15, 2014 (1)	Cedar Falls, IA	Northern Iowa	6–0
109	April 15, 2014 (2)	Cedar Falls, IA	Drake	4–1
110	April 23, 2014	Des Moines, IA	Drake	7–1
111	February 8, 2015	Cedar Falls, IA	Drake	7–1
112	April 14, 2015 (1)	Des Moines, IA	Drake	6–2
113	April 14, 2015 (2)	Des Moines, IA	Northern Iowa	3–1
114	April 22, 2015	Cedar Falls, IA	Northern Iowa	3–2
115	April 19, 2016 (1)	Cedar Falls, IA	Northern Iowa	8–0
116	April 19, 2016 (2)	Cedar Falls, IA	Northern Iowa	7–1
117	April 27, 2016	Des Moines, IA	Drake	3–2
118	April 18, 2017 (1)	Des Moines, IA	Northern Iowa	12–0
119	April 18, 2017 (2)	Des Moines, IA	Northern Iowa	3–0
120	April 25, 2017	Cedar Falls, IA	Northern Iowa	5–2
121	April 17, 2018 (1)	Cedar Falls, IA	Drake	4–0
122	April 17, 2018 (2)	Cedar Falls, IA	Drake	4–3
123	April 24, 2018	Des Moines, IA	Drake	6–0
124	April 9, 2019 (1)	Des Moines, IA	Drake	11–3
125	April 9, 2019 (2)	Des Moines, IA	Drake	3–1
126	April 23, 2019	Cedar Falls, IA	Drake	1–0
127	May 11, 2019	Peoria, IL	Drake	4–1
128	April 20, 2021 (1)	Des Moines, IA	Northern Iowa	2–1
129	April 20, 2021 (2)	Des Moines, IA	Drake	9–1
130	April 27, 2021	Cedar Falls, IA	Northern Iowa	13–5
131	April 19, 2022 (1)	Cedar Falls, IA	Northern Iowa	10–2
132	April 19, 2022 (2)	Cedar Falls, IA	Northern Iowa	7–4
133	April 26, 2022	Des Moines, IA	Northern Iowa	4–1
134	May 13, 2022	Springfield, MO	Northern Iowa	9–1
135	April 11, 2023	Cedar Falls, IA	Northern Iowa	9–1
136	April 18, 2023	Des Moines, IA	Northern Iowa	9–2
137	April 25, 2023	Cedar Falls, IA	Northern Iowa	11–2
138	May 11, 2023	Carbondale, IL	Northern Iowa	6–2
139	April 9, 2024	Des Moines, IA	Northern Iowa	7–0
140	April 17, 2024	Cedar Falls, IA	Northern Iowa	7–5
141	April 23, 2024	Des Moines, IA	Northern Iowa	6–0
142	April 8, 2025	Des Moines, IA	Drake	7–1
143	April 15, 2025	Cedar Falls, IA	Drake	8–7
144	April 16, 2025	Cedar Falls, IA	Northern Iowa	12–11
Series: Northern Iowa leads 83–61

°2020 games were canceled due to COVID-19 pandemic

== Swimming & Diving ==
The Northern Iowa women are currently the only team classified as an NCAA Division I swimming & diving program. The Northern Iowa men along with Drake men and women are currently classified as college club status.

The Panther and Bulldog men and women teams have transitioned in-between classification for swimming & diving. The Drake men's swimming team won the 1929 Missouri Valley Conference team championship. The Panther men and women, along with the Bulldog men, have never won the Missouri Valley Conference team championship.

== Men's Tennis ==
The Missouri Valley Conference first held a regular season team round robin format along with an end of the season conference team tournament during the 1996–97 season. From 1911 to 1912 season to the 1996–97 season the conference had only held a year end tournament to determine their team champion. Northern Iowa and Drake competed on six occasions in the team format prior to the Panthers re-classification as college club status in 2003. The Panthers and Bulldogs also competed in individual competitions at the NCAA Division I level each season.

Northern Iowa have not won a Missouri Valley Conference team championship or advanced to the NCAA Division I team tournament. Drake has won nine Missouri Valley Conference regular season championships and ten Missouri Valley Conference tournament championships. The Bulldogs also won two Summit League championships. Drake advanced to the second round of the NCAA Division I team championships in 2013 and 2015.

Northern Iowa victories	Drake victories	Ties

No.	Date	Location	Winner	Score
1	April 12, 1997	Des Moines, IA	Drake	8–1
2	April 11, 1998	Cedar Falls, IA	Drake	7–2
3	April 10, 1999	Des Moines, IA	Drake	6–3
4	April 22, 2000	Cedar Falls, IA	Drake	8–1

No.	Date	Location	Winner	Score
5	March 31, 2001	Des Moines, IA	Drake	6–1
6	March 27, 2002	Cedar Falls, IA	Drake	4–3
Series: Drake leads 6–0

== Women's Tennis ==
A regular season team round robin format along with an end of the season conference team tournament was first held by the Missouri Valley Conference during the 1996–97 season. The conference had previously only held a year end tournament to determine their team champion. The Panthers and Bulldogs have competed against each other every year in a team format since that season. Northern Iowa has not won a Missouri Valley Conference team championship or advanced to the NCAA Division I team tournament. Drake has won two regular season team Missouri Valley Conference championships and nine Missouri Valley Conference team tournament championships. The Bulldogs have yet to advance past the first round of the NCAA Division I team championships.

In addition, the Panthers and Bulldogs have competed in individual competitions at the NCAA Division I level each season since the founding of their programs.

Northern Iowa victories	Drake victories	Ties

No.	Date	Location	Winner	Score
1	April 5, 1997	Cedar Falls, IA	Drake	7–2
2	April 4, 1998	Des Moines, IA	Drake	6–3
3	April 3, 1999	Cedar Falls, IA	Drake	7–2
4	April 1, 2000	Des Moines, IA	Drake	8–1
5	April 28, 2000	Omaha, NE	Drake	5–2
6	March 31, 2001	Cedar Falls, IA	Northern Iowa	5–2
7	March 15, 2002	Des Moines, IA	Drake	5–2
8	March 13, 2003	Cedar Falls, IA	Drake	7–0
9	March 7, 2004	Des Moines, IA	Drake	6–1
10	March 4, 2005	Cedar Falls, IA	Drake	4–3
11	March 3, 2006	Des Moines, IA	Drake	4–3
12	April 1, 2007	Cedar Falls, IA	Northern Iowa	4–3
13	March 30, 2008	Des Moines, IA	Northern Iowa	4–3
14	March 29, 2009	Cedar Falls, IA	Drake	6–1
15	March 28, 2010	Des Moines, IA	Northern Iowa	4–3
16	April 3, 2011	Cedar Falls, IA	Northern Iowa	5–2
17	March 31, 2012	Des Moines, IA	Drake	4–3

No.	Date	Location	Winner	Score
18	April 27, 2012	Omaha, NE	Drake	4–1
19	March 30, 2013	Cedar Falls, IA	Drake	5–2
20	April 26, 2013	Wichita, KS	Drake	4–1
21	March 30, 2014	Des Moines, IA	Drake	6–1
22	March 28, 2015	Cedar Falls, IA	Drake	5–2
23	April 25, 2015	Evansville, IN	Drake	5–0
24	March 26, 2016	Des Moines, IA	Drake	5–2
25	April 1, 2017	Cedar Falls, IA	Northern Iowa	4–3
26	March 31, 2018	Des Moines, IA	Drake	4–3
27	April 5, 2019	Cedar Falls, IA	Drake	6–1
28	March 12, 2021	Cedar Falls, IA	Drake	7–0
29	March 4, 2022	Des Moines, IA	Drake	7–0
30	April 15, 2023	Cedar Falls, IA	Drake	6–1
31	March 29, 2024	Des Moines, IA	Drake	7–0
32	April 12, 2025	Cedar Falls, IA	Northern Iowa	4–3
Series: Drake leads 25–7

°The 2020 match in Des Moines was canceled due to the COVID-19 pandemic.

== Track & Field ==
Northern Iowa and Drake compete at the NCAA Division I level in men's and women's indoor and outdoor track & field. The Panther and Bulldog men's and women's teams have traditionally competed in NCAA Division I regionals and at the NCAA Division I championships in both indoor and outdoor competitions. The men have won twenty-two Missouri Valley Conference indoor team championships (Northern Iowa 14, Drake 8) and twenty Missouri Valley Conference outdoor team championships (Northern Iowa 10, Drake 10). The Northern Iowa women have won two Missouri Valley Conference indoor team championships and one Missouri Valley Conference outdoor team championship; while the Drake women have not yet won a team championship in Missouri Valley Conference indoor or outdoor competition.

The Panthers usually attend the Jim Duncan Invitational and the Drake Relays held at Drake Stadium. The Bulldogs normally attend the Jack Jennett Open at the UNI Dome. They also compete against each other in Big Four Duels and other meets throughout the season.

== Women's Volleyball ==
Northern Iowa and Drake first met in women's volleyball in 1975. The Panthers have appeared in twenty-three NCAA Division I tournaments, advancing the NCAA Division I Sweet Sixteen three times (1999, 2001, and 2002). Northern Iowa has won seventeen Missouri Valley Conference regular season championships and seventeen Missouri Valley Conference tournament championships. The Bulldogs have yet to win a Missouri Valley Conference title or advance to an NCAA Division I tournament. The Panthers and Bulldogs both appeared in the AIWA Tournament regional rounds from 1975 to 1980 (the predecessor to the NCAA Division I tournament).

The teams have played six times in the Missouri Valley Conference tournament with Northern Iowa winning five of the meetings.

The 2020 match-ups were postponed to January 2021 due to the COVID-19 Pandemic.

Northern Iowa victories	Drake victories	Ties

No.	Date	Location	Winner	Score
1	September 12, 1975	Lamoni, IA	Tie	1–1
2	November 10, 1976	Des Moines, IA	Northern Iowa	2–1
3	October 22, 1977	Cedar Falls, IA	Drake	2–0
4	November 11, 1977	Des Moines, IA	Drake	2–0
5	October 28, 1978	Des Moines, IA	Drake	2–0
6	November 10, 1978	Cedar Falls, IA	Northern Iowa	3–2
7	October 2, 1979	Des Moines, IA	Northern Iowa	3–2
8	October 5, 1979	Iowa City, IA	Northern Iowa	3–0
9	October 12, 1979	Minneapolis, MN	Northern Iowa	3–0
10	October 24, 1979	Columbia, MO	Northern Iowa	3–2
11	September 30, 1980	Des Moines, IA	Drake	3–2
12	October 3, 1980	Iowa City, IA	Tie	1–1
13	October 8, 1980	Iowa City, IA	Drake	3–1
14	September 12, 1981	Manhattan, KS	Drake	2–0
15	October 19, 1981	Des Moines, IA	Northern Iowa	3–1
16	November 3, 1981	Des Moines, IA	Northern Iowa	3–2
17	October 18, 1982	Brookings, SD	Drake	3–0
18	November 1, 1982	DeKalb, IL	Drake	3–1
19	September 28, 1983	Des Moines, IA	Northern Iowa	3–2
20	October 18, 1983	Cedar Falls, IA	Drake	3–0
21	September 27, 1984	Des Moines, IA	Drake	3–0
22	October 16, 1984	Cedar Falls, IA	Northern Iowa	3–2
23	September 24, 1985	Peoria, IL	Northern Iowa	3–0
24	October 12, 1985	Chicago, IL	Northern Iowa	3–0
25	October 22, 1985	Des Moines, IA	Northern Iowa	3–0
26	September 5, 1986	Cedar Falls, IA	Northern Iowa	3–0
27	September 24, 1986	Cedar Falls, IA	Northern Iowa	3–0
28	October 14, 1986	Terre Haute, IN	Northern Iowa	3–0
29	September 17, 1987	Boulder, CO	Northern Iowa	3–0
30	October 20, 1987	Des Moines, IA	Northern Iowa	3–1
31	September 3, 1988	Iowa City, IA	Northern Iowa	3–1
32	October 18, 1988	Cedar Falls, IA	Northern Iowa	3–0
33	September 9, 1989	Iowa City, IA	Northern Iowa	3–0
34	November 3, 1989	Des Moines, IA	Northern Iowa	3–0
35	September 8, 1990	Iowa City, IA	Northern Iowa	3–0
36	October 16, 1990	Cedar Falls, IA	Northern Iowa	3–0
37	September 8, 1991	Iowa City, IA	Northern Iowa	3–1
38	October 1, 1991	Des Moines, IA	Northern Iowa	3–0
39	October 13, 1992	Des Moines, IA	Northern Iowa	3–1
40	November 13, 1992	Cedar Falls, IA	Northern Iowa	3–0
41	October 6, 1993	Cedar Falls, IA	Northern Iowa	3–0
42	November 6, 1993	Des Moines, IA	Northern Iowa	3–0
43	October 1, 1994	Des Moines, IA	Northern Iowa	3–0
44	October 25, 1994	Cedar Falls, IA	Northern Iowa	3–0
45	November 19, 1994	Cedar Falls, IA	Northern Iowa	3–0
46	September 15, 1995	Cedar Falls, IA	Northern Iowa	3–1
47	October 11, 1995	Des Moines, IA	Northern Iowa	3–2
48	November 19, 1995	Normal, IL	Northern Iowa	3–1
49	October 11, 1996	Des Moines, IA	Drake	3–1
50	November 9, 1996	Cedar Falls, IA	Northern Iowa	3–1
51	November 23, 1996	Springfield, MO	Drake	3–1
52	September 19, 1997	Des Moines, IA	Northern Iowa	3–1
53	October 18, 1997	Cedar Falls, IA	Northern Iowa	3–2
54	September 26, 1998	Cedar Falls, IA	Northern Iowa	3–0
55	October 24, 1998	Des Moines, IA	Northern Iowa	3–0
56	November 21, 1998	Wichita, KS	Northern Iowa	3–1
57	September 18, 1999	Cedar Falls, IA	Northern Iowa	3–0

No.	Date	Location	Winner	Score
58	October 15, 1999	Des Moines, IA	Northern Iowa	3–0
59	September 29, 2000	Cedar Falls, IA	Northern Iowa	3–0
60	October 28, 2000	Des Moines, IA	Northern Iowa	3–1
61	October 12, 2001	Des Moines, IA	Northern Iowa	3–1
62	November 10, 2001	Cedar Falls, IA	Northern Iowa	3–0
63	September 20, 2002	Cedar Falls, IA	Northern Iowa	3–0
64	September 19, 2002	Des Moines, IA	Northern Iowa	3–0
65	October 4, 2003	Cedar Falls, IA	Northern Iowa	3–0
66	October 31, 2003	Des Moines, IA	Northern Iowa	3–0
67	October 15, 2004	Cedar Falls, IA	Northern Iowa	3–0
68	November 13, 2004	Des Moines, IA	Northern Iowa	3–1
69	September 16, 2005	Des Moines, IA	Northern Iowa	3–0
70	November 19, 2005	Cedar Falls, IA	Northern Iowa	3–0
71	October 7, 2006	Des Moines, IA	Northern Iowa	3–0
72	November 3, 2006	Cedar Falls, IA	Northern Iowa	3–0
73	September 22, 2007	Cedar Falls, IA	Northern Iowa	3–1
74	October 19, 2007	Des Moines, IA	Northern Iowa	3–0
75	September 18, 2008	Cedar Falls, IA	Northern Iowa	3–1
76	November 20, 2008	Des Moines, IA	Northern Iowa	3–1
77	September 18, 2009	Des Moines, IA	Northern Iowa	3–0
78	November 21, 2009	Cedar Falls, IA	Northern Iowa	3–2
79	September 25, 2010	Des Moines, IA	Northern Iowa	3–1
80	October 22, 2010	Des Moines, IA	Northern Iowa	3–1
81	October 14, 2011	Des Moines, IA	Northern Iowa	3–1
82	November 12, 2011	Cedar Falls, IA	Northern Iowa	3–1
83	October 6, 2012	Des Moines, IA	Northern Iowa	3–1
84	November 2, 2012	Cedar Falls, IA	Northern Iowa	3–0
85	October 5, 2013	Cedar Falls, IA	Northern Iowa	3–1
86	November 2, 2013	Des Moines, IA	Northern Iowa	3–0
87	September 22, 2014	Des Moines, IA	Northern Iowa	3–0
88	October 25, 2014	Cedar Falls, IA	Northern Iowa	3–0
89	October 17, 2015	Cedar Falls, IA	Northern Iowa	3–0
90	November 14, 2015	Des Moines, IA	Northern Iowa	3–2
91	October 8, 2016	Des Moines, IA	Northern Iowa	3–0
92	November 5, 2016	Cedar Falls, IA	Northern Iowa	3–0
93	October 17, 2017	Cedar Falls, IA	Northern Iowa	3–0
94	November 18, 2017	Des Moines, IA	Northern Iowa	3–0
95	September 21, 2018	Cedar Falls, IA	Northern Iowa	3–0
96	October 19, 2018	Des Moines, IA	Northern Iowa	3–2
97	October 18, 2019	Cedar Falls, IA	Northern Iowa	3–1
98	November 5, 2019	Des Moines, IA	Northern Iowa	3–1
99	January 22, 2021 ^{(2020)}	Des Moines, IA	Drake	3–1
100	January 29, 2021 ^{(2020)}	Cedar Falls, IA	Drake	3–1
101	October 1, 2021	Cedar Falls, IA	Drake	3–0
102	October 29, 2021	Des Moines, IA	Northern Iowa	3–2
103	October 11, 2022	Cedar Falls, IA	Northern Iowa	3–1
104	November 16, 2022	Des Moines, IA	Drake	3–1
105	November 23, 2022	Evansville, IN	Northern Iowa	3–2
106	October 16, 2023	Des Moines, IA	Northern Iowa	3–1
107	November 15, 2023	Cedar Falls, IA	Northern Iowa	3–1
108	November 22, 2023	Springfield, MO	Northern Iowa	3–2
109	October 14, 2024	Cedar Falls, IA	Northern Iowa	3–0
110	November 20, 2024	Des Moines, IA	Northern Iowa	3–0
111	September 30, 2025	Des Moines, IA	Northern Iowa	3–1
112	November 4, 2025	Cedar Falls, IA	Northern Iowa	3–1
Series: Northern Iowa leads 94–16–2

== Wrestling ==
Northern Iowa is a traditional contender in college wrestling winning the 1950 NCAA Division I national title. The Panthers also finished as runners-up in the 1946, 1947, 1949 and 1952 NCAA Division I tournaments. Drake competed in NCAA Division I wrestling until 1994 when their team was re-classified as college club status. The schools have competed in twelve varsity duels on the wrestling mat with the Panthers claiming all twelve team victories.

Northern Iowa victories	Drake victories	Ties

No.	Date	Location	Winner	Score
1	January 2, 1982	Cedar Falls, IA	Northern Iowa	44–0
2	February 4, 1983	Des Moines, IA	Northern Iowa	45–4
3	February 7, 1984	Cedar Falls, IA	Northern Iowa	42–3
4	February 1, 1985	Des Moines, IA	Northern Iowa	38–6
5	February 14, 1986	Cedar Falls, IA	Northern Iowa	43–0
6	February 20, 1987	Des Moines, IA	Northern Iowa	29–12
7	February 20, 1988	Cedar Falls, IA	Northern Iowa	42–3

No.	Date	Location	Winner	Score
8	February 18, 1989	Des Moines, IA	Northern Iowa	32–5
9	February 16, 1990	Cedar Falls, IA	Northern Iowa	30–8
10	February 8, 1991	Des Moines, IA	Northern Iowa	26–9
11	February 5, 1992	Cedar Falls, IA	Northern Iowa	32–5
12	January 30, 1993	Des Moines, IA	Northern Iowa	31–9
Series: Northern Iowa leads 12–0

== Club Sport(s) ==
Northern Iowa and Drake have competed in multiple other men's and women's sports classified as college club status since their founding including archery, badminton, beach volleyball, bowling, climbing, cricket, croquet, curling, cycling, disc golf, dodgeball, fencing, field hockey, gymnastics, handball, ice hockey, lacrosse, martial arts, racquetball, rugby, sailing, shooting/pistol, spikeball, table tennis, ultimate frisbee, volleyball (men only), water polo, and weightlifting.

== See also ==
- Big Four Classic
