= Leslie Davis =

Leslie Davis may refer to:

- Les Davis (1900–1966), American football coach
- Les Davis (American football) (1937–2007), American football player
- Leslie Davis (diplomat) (1876–1960), American diplomat
