= Griff (mascot) =

Live Bulldog mascot of Drake University

- Griff III poses for a picture in 2026
- University: Drake University
- Description: English Bulldog
- Origin of name: John L. Griffith
- Related mascot(s): Butler Blue

Griff is the official live mascot of Drake University. Griff III, the current iteration of Griff, is an English Bulldog whose real name is Gus. There have been three bulldogs to bear the name Griff at Drake, with the most recent, who assumed the name in May 2026, "taking the reigns" from Griff II at the end of the 2025-26 academic year. The name "Griff" can be attributed to former Drake football coach and creator of the Drake Relays, John L. Griffith, who became known for bringing his two English Bulldogs to the practices and games as he coached. Because of this tradition, Des Moines Register sports editor Art Gordon eventually dubbed the teams "the Bulldogs."

== Griff III ==
Griff III was born on February 22, 2025. He succeeded Griff II when he took over as Drake University's official live mascot in May of 2026 in a Changing of the Harness ceremony. Griff III is described by the University as being affectionate, social, eager to please, and very smart. “He’s curious, gentle, brave, and a very funny guy. He is highly food motivated, which will certainly help with training” said Erin Bell, live mascot program director.

Griff II played an important role in his successor’s interview process. The two have become fast friends, and Griff II will serve as his mentor during training and as his big brother at home. Griff III’s social media channels are as follows: Instagram: @drakeugriff, Facebook: Griff III, Drake University Live Mascot, TikTok: @drakeugriff.

== Griff II ==
Griff II (born July 12, 2018), informally known as George, became Drake's official live mascot effective before the 2020–21 school year. The name "George" is a nod to George T. Carpenter, the first president of Drake University. Officially introduced on July 1, 2020, he succeeded Griff I upon his retirement on June 30, 2020. An inauguration for Griff II was held in August 2020, involving a "changing of the harness" ceremony.

The arrival of Griff II also cemented the university's dedication to the Live Mascot program, with Griff II becoming known as "Des Moines' hometown dog."

Griff II is known for his storied history of community engagement, which ranges from appearances at sporting events and musicals to community outreach programs and even presidential debates.

Both Griff II and his predecessor, Griff I (also known as Griff the First), are handled by Erin Bell, the associate director of marketing and manager of the live mascot program. Her husband, Kevin, and their two children contribute to Griff II's success as well.

With Drake basketball winning their conference tournament in 2025, the Bulldogs were set to head back to March Madness. The NCAA's policy prohibits live mascots from attending the games, much to the chagrin of Drake fans and others nationwide who were introduced to Griff II through previous televised games. Fans started a fundraiser and began collecting signatures in an effort to petition the NCAA to change their policy, which was unsuccessful.

On December 3, 2025, Griff II announced his retirement as Drake's live mascot, effective May 2026. Bell noted that "Griff II is in great health, but after six years of dedicated service, he’s earned a long and happy retirement. We encourage everyone to come celebrate him throughout this final academic year—he deserves all the love and praise. And I assure you, he has been an active participant in the Griff III selection process. It’s no secret who calls the shots around here." Subsequently, an announcement was made about Griff III on December 4, with fans being invited to come greet the nine-month-old bulldog the next day.

== Griff I ==
Griff I (May 8, 2012—March 4, 2024), formally known simply as "Griff" and subsequently referred to as the "OG (Original Griff)", served from October 2015 until his retirement from the role on June 30, 2020. Griff I was chosen as the first-ever official live mascot of Drake University due to his "exceptional temperament and demeanor" in addition to his classic bulldog stature and appearance.

Born in Canada in 2012, Griff I succeeded Porterhouse as the live mascot of Drake University, although Porterhouse never served in any official capacity. Nevertheless, Griff followed in the pawprints of Porterhouse and served diligently for five years, welcoming countless students into the community and making frequent appearances at athletic events, Drake Relays, and a presidential debate during the 2019-20 election cycle.

Griff retired on June 30, 2020, leaving behind a lasting legacy and marking the official beginning of the live mascot program at the school. Throughout his tenure, he started "Griff Gives Back," an annual pet food collection campaign which has resulted in hundreds of thousands of pounds of food donated for The Pet Project Midwest. He was a certified therapy dog, unlike his successor, Griff II, who is only a de facto therapy dog.

In the Fall of 2020, a plaza including a bronze statue of Griff was built outside of Old Main. Griff I peacefully passed away on March 4, 2024, at the age of 11, surrounded by his family at the home of his handler, Erin Bell.

== Porterhouse ==
Porterhouse (died 2013) was an English Bulldog who served as the first "unofficial official" live mascot at Drake University. He was entered into the 2009 Beautiful Bulldog contest, which takes place annually during the week of Drake Relays. Typically, the winning bulldog is honored and celebrated during the relays, then passes the title to a new bulldog the following year. Porterhouse won the competition in 2009 and went on to capture the hearts of Drake students and alumni alike.

Porterhouse was a certified therapy dog who visited hospitals periodically. He also attended Drake athletic events, such as football and volleyball games. Seeing the love that the community had for the bulldog, Drake's at-the-time athletic director, Sandy Hatfield-Clubb, asked Porterhouse's owners (Erin & Kevin Bell) if they would allow him to serve as the school's first-ever live mascot.

Porterhouse could handle large crowds, loud environments, and a full schedule. He became known for his gentle demeanor, patience, and loyalty.

Porterhouse suddenly passed away in 2013, and the loss was mourned by many in the community. He was honored with a moment of silence before the Drake men's basketball game against Evansville, allowing fans to mourn and remember the "ultimate ambassador" for Drake and its community.

== See also ==
- List of individual dogs
