= Knapp Center =

Multi-purpose arena in Des Moines, Iowa

- "The Knapp"
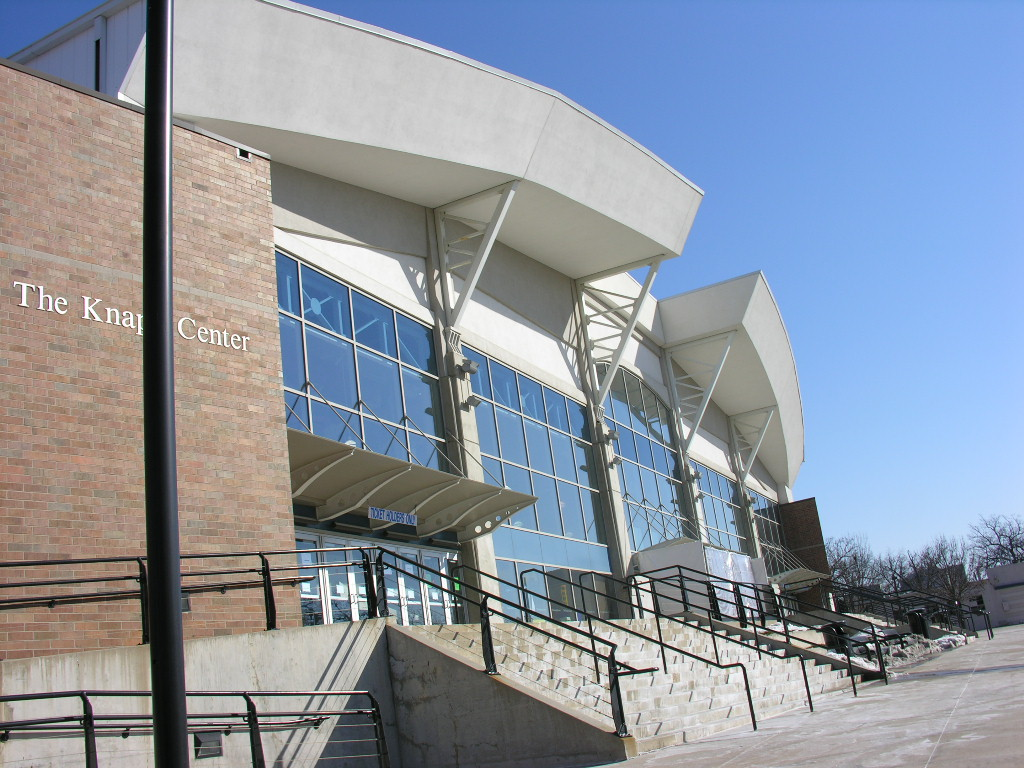
- Interactive map of Knapp Center
- Location: 2601 Forest Avenue; Des Moines, Iowa 50311 U.S.
- Coordinates: 41°36′16″N 93°39′7″W
- Owner: Drake University
- Operator: Drake University
- Capacity: 6,424 (2022–present); 7,152 (1992–2022)
- Surface: Hardwood

Construction
- Groundbreaking: 1990
- Opened: December 1, 1992
- Cost: $12.5 million ($28.7 million in 2025 dollars)
- Architects: RDG Planning & Design
- General contractor: Taylor Ball Construction Company

Tenant
- Drake Bulldogs (NCAA DI) (1992–present)

The Knapp Center is a 6,424-seat multi-purpose arena on the campus of Drake University in Des Moines, Iowa, United States. It was built in 1992.

The Knapp Center is the center building for three athletic buildings combined. The Bell Center to the west is a general athletic building with offices, a pool, gym, and locker rooms. To the east is the Shivers' Basketball Practice facility, which opened in 2014. The Knapp Center itself also holds a weight room by the northwest corner of the basketball court.

The namesake of the arena comes from William Knapp, who is the chairman of Iowa Realty and a member of the Drake University Board of Trustees. He played a key role in financing the arena with a $3 million gift towards construction.

After receiving a donation from Hy-Vee, the court was named in honor Drake alum and former Hy-Vee CEO Ron Pearson as "Ron Pearson Court" on September 18, 2010.

Renovations in the summer of 2022 reconfigured the lower bowl of seating, reducing capacity but filling in corners and adding premium seating options.

== Events ==
The arena is the home arena for Drake men's and women's basketball and Drake women's volleyball. The first Drake Bulldogs basketball game was played on December 5, 1992.

During a Missouri Valley Conference record 47 straight conference win streak spanning from 2016 to 2019, the Drake Bulldogs women's basketball team recorded a conference record 22 straight home conference wins during the span. Both records are second in NCAA women's history to UConn Huskies women's basketball.

During the Drake Relays the arena hosts the Beautiful Bulldog Contest and serves as a media center for athlete interviews along with providing additional locker room and warm-up facilities for athletes.

Each May, in addition to Drake University commencement ceremonies the arena hosts numerous area high school graduation ceremonies.

The arena has also hosted media and campaign spin rooms during on-campus political debates and hosted various academic lectures, including lectures from Maya Angelou, Tim Gunn, as well as appearances by former Presidents Jimmy Carter and Donald Trump.

== Gallery ==
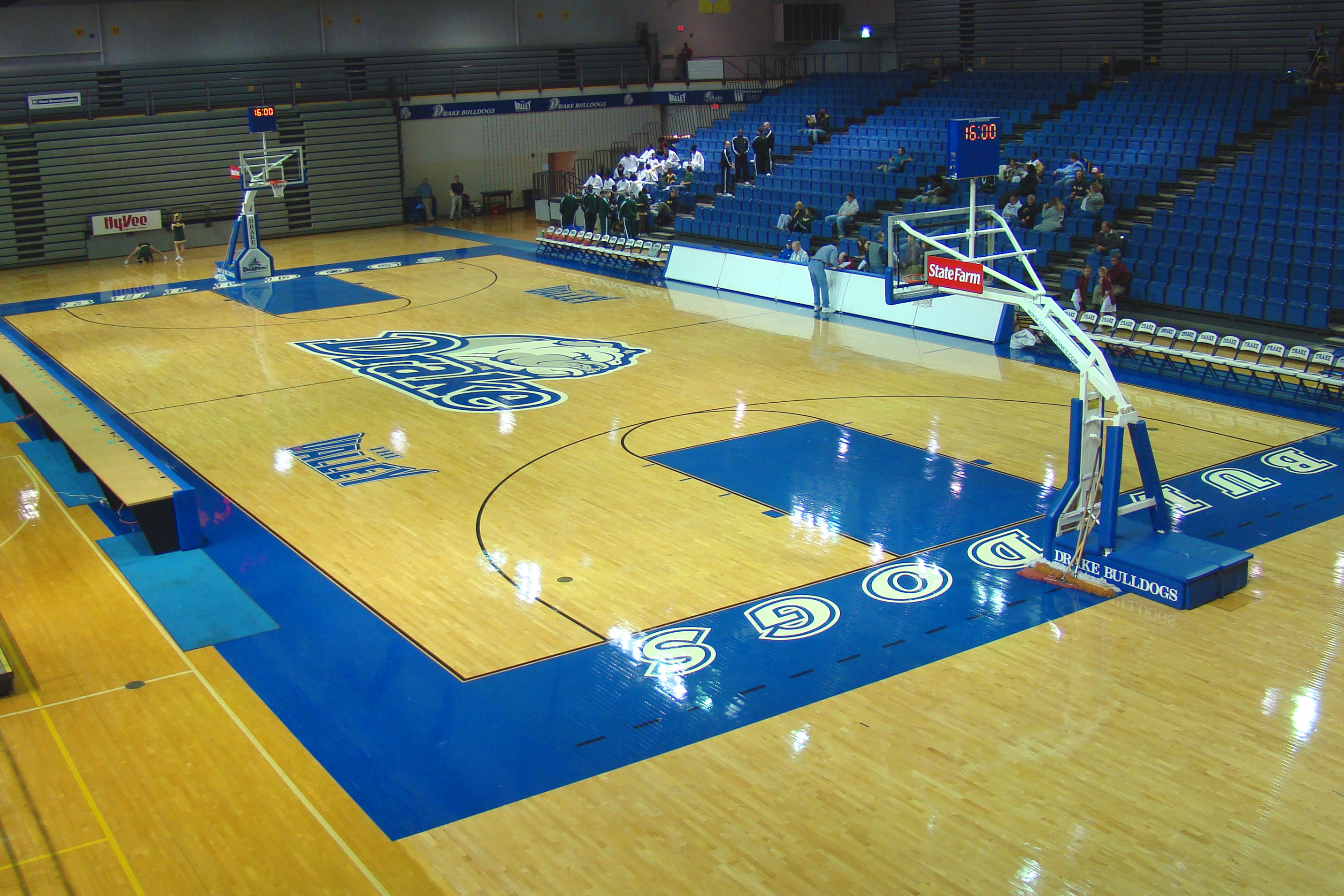
Inside the Knapp Center

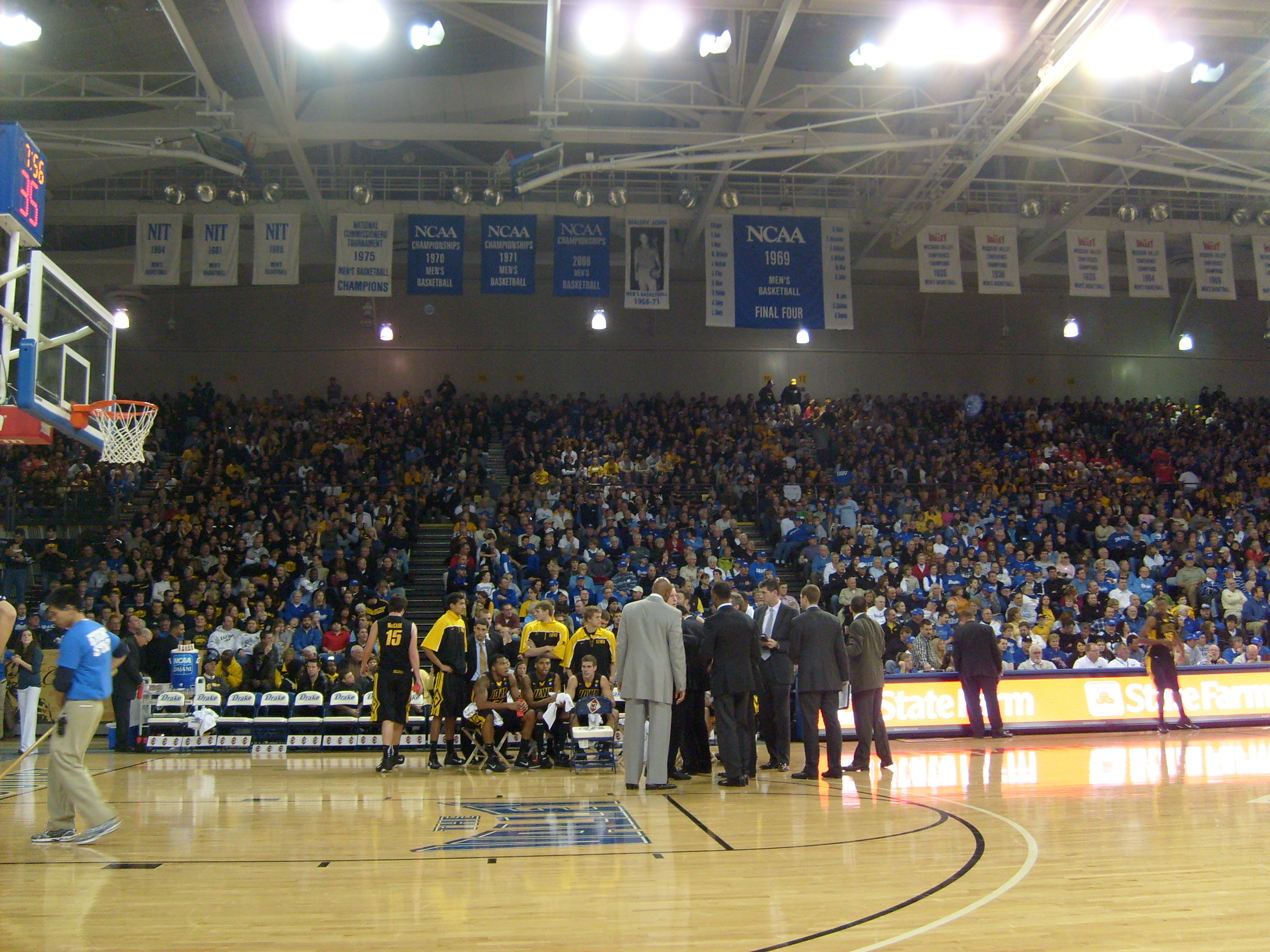
Inside the Knapp Center during the Iowa vs Drake game on December 18, 2010

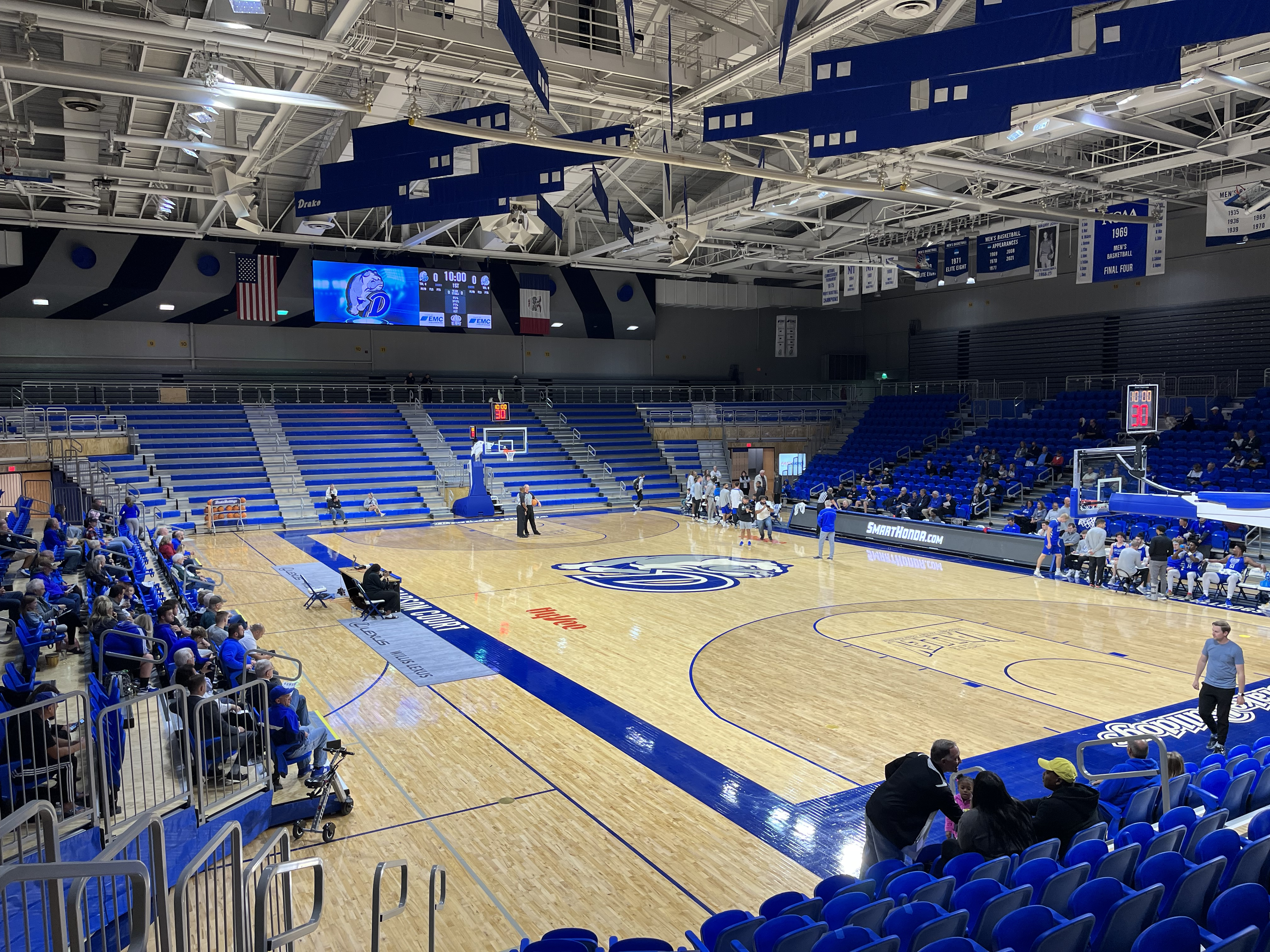
The Knapp Center during a scrimmage following 2022 renovations

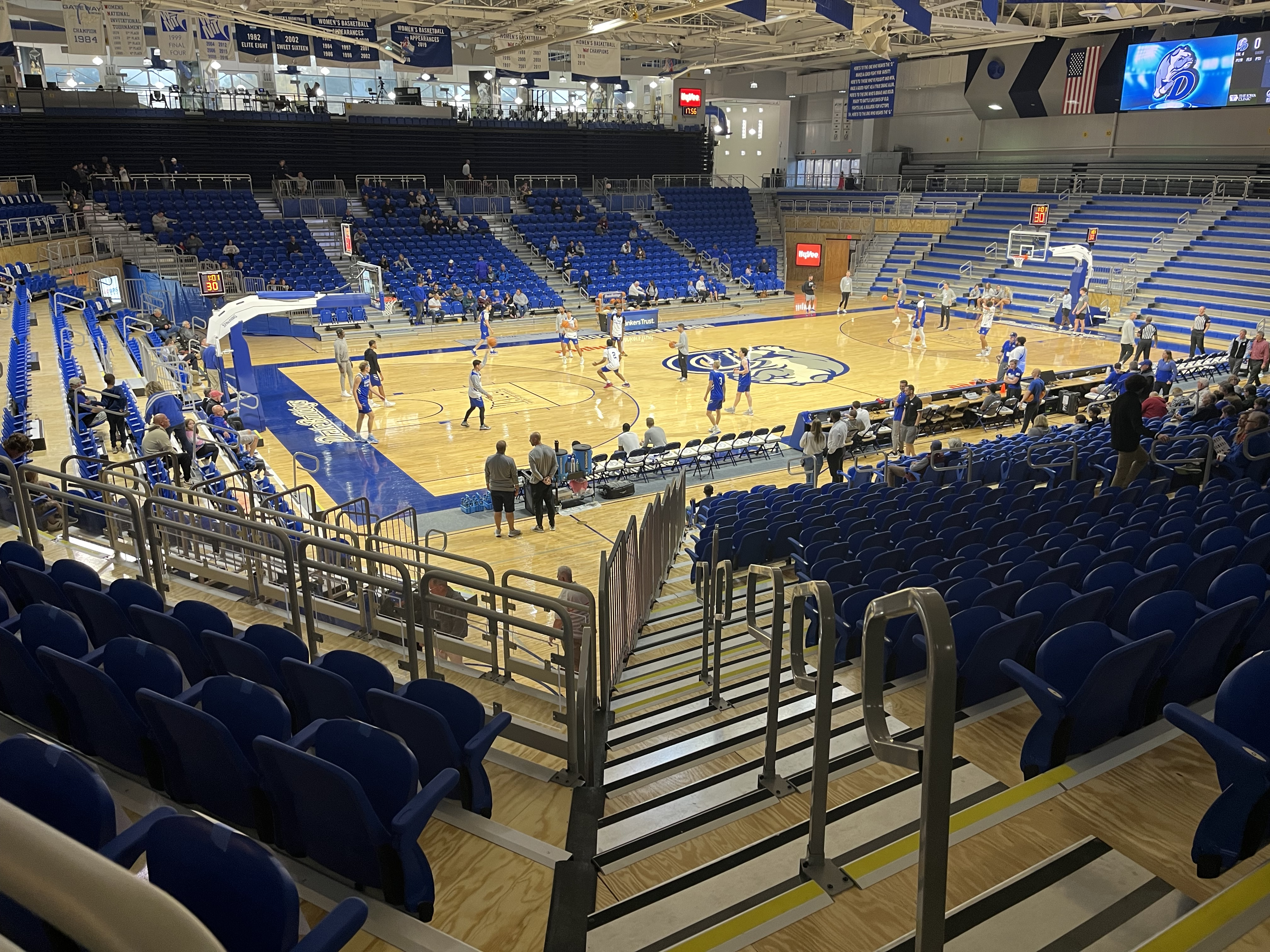
A 2022 preseason scrimmage

== See also ==
- List of NCAA Division I basketball arenas
