= Sanders Shiver =

American football player and coach (born 1955)

- Shiver in 1977

No. 54, 52, 96
- Position: Linebacker

Personal information
- Born: February 14, 1955 (age 71); Gadsden, South Carolina, U.S.
- Listed height: 6 ft 2 in (1.88 m)
- Listed weight: 227 lb (103 kg)

Career information
- High school: Lower Richland (Hopkins, South Carolina)
- College: Carson–Newman
- NFL draft: 1976: 5th round, 134th overall pick

Career history

Playing
- Baltimore Colts (1976–1983); Miami Dolphins (1984–1985)

Coaching
- Bowie State (1986–1988) Assistant; Bowie State (1989–1992) Head coach

Career NFL statistics
- Games played: 132
- Starts: 53
- Interceptions: 5
- Sacks: 5
- Fumble recoveries: 5
- Stats at Pro Football Reference

Sanders Shiver (/ˈʃaɪvər/ SHY-vər; born February 14, 1955) is an American former football player and coach. A fifth round draft choice out of Carson–Newman College—now known as Carson–Newman University—in 1976, he professionally played ten years as a linebacker in the National Football League (NFL) with the Baltimore Colts and Miami Dolphins.

Shiver served as the head football coach at Bowie State University in Bowie, Maryland from 1989 to 1992, compiling a record of 15–24–1. Shiver was an assistant coach at Bowie State from 1986 to 1988 under Dave Dolch, before succeeding him as head coach in December 1988 when Dolch left to become the head football coach at Morningside College in Sioux City, Iowa.

Shiver currently works for the public school system of Prince George's County, Maryland, is married, and has four daughters.

== Head coaching record ==
=== College ===
Year	Team	Overall	Conference	Standing	Bowl/playoffs
Bowie State Bulldogs (Central Intercollegiate Athletic Association) (1989–1992)
1989	Bowie State	7–3–1	5–1	1st (Northern)	
1990	Bowie State	3–6	2–4	T–5th (Northern)	
1991	Bowie State	4–5	2–5	8th	
1992	Bowie State	1–10	1–5	11th	
Bowie State:		15–24–1	10–15		
Total:		15–24–1			
National championship Conference title Conference division title or championship game berth
