= Drake Bulldogs =

Intercollegiate sports teams of Drake University

- University: Drake University
- Nickname: Bulldogs
- NCAA: Division I (FCS)
- Conference: Missouri Valley Conference (primary); Pioneer Football League; Metro Atlantic Athletic Conference (women's rowing); Mid-American Conference (men's tennis)
- Athletic director: Brian Hardin
- Location: Des Moines, Iowa
- Varsity teams: 18
- Football stadium: Drake Stadium (football, track)
- Basketball arena: Knapp Center
- Colors: Blue and white
- Mascot: Spike (costumed); Griff (live)
- Website: godrakebulldogs.com
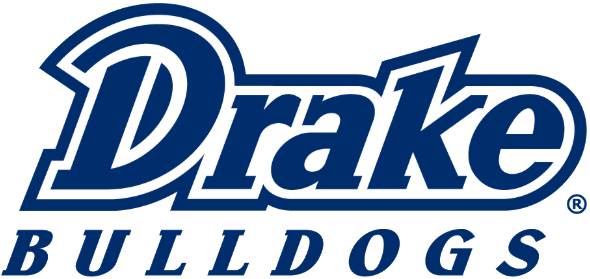

The Drake Bulldogs are the intercollegiate athletics teams that represent Drake University, located in Des Moines, Iowa, United States. The Bulldogs' athletic program is a member of the Missouri Valley Conference (MVC) and competes at the NCAA Division I level. Drake also sponsors teams in the Pioneer Football League, Metro Atlantic Athletic Conference, and Summit League. Drake's live bulldog mascot is Griff; the costumed mascot is Spike; and the school colors are blue and white.

== History ==
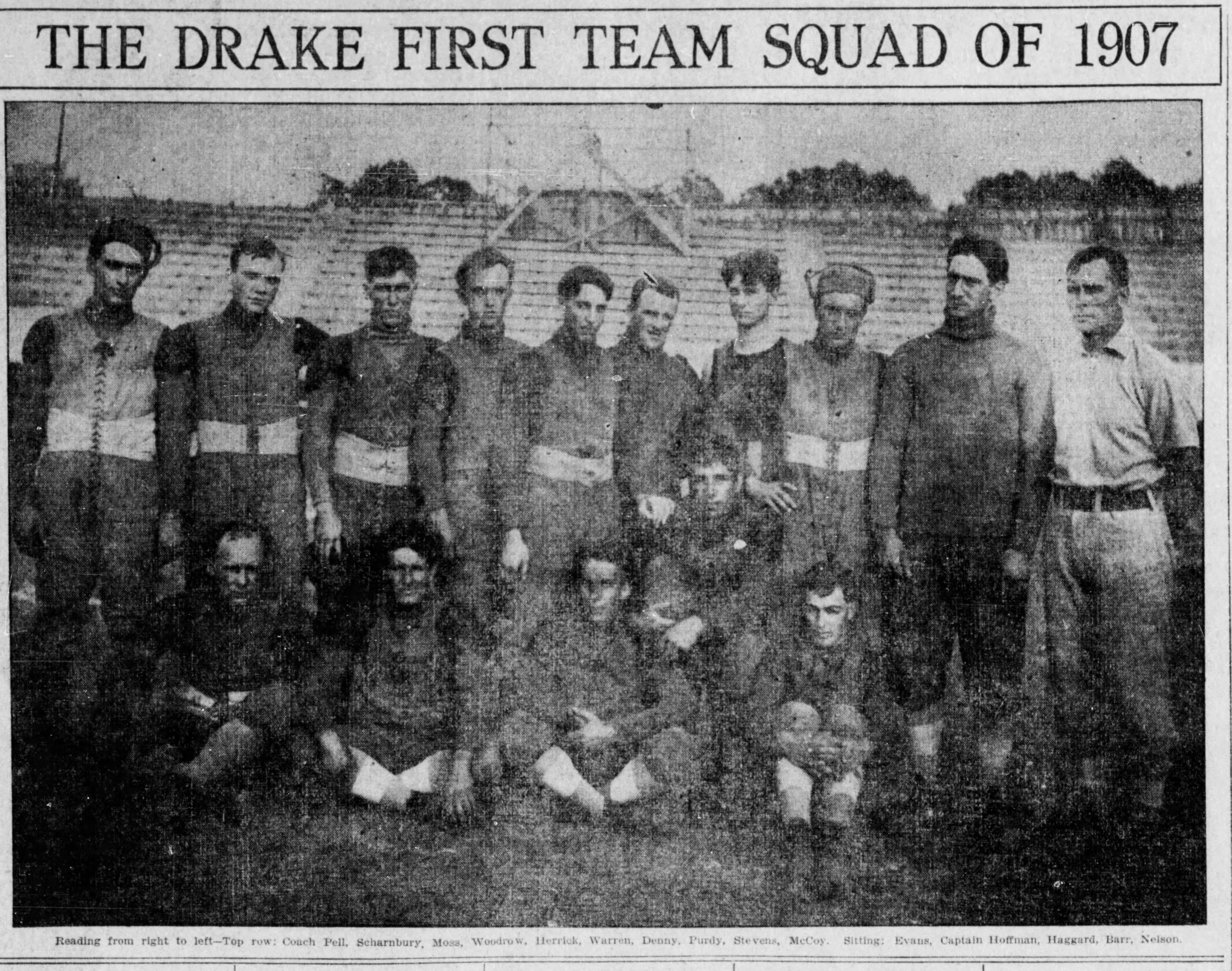
Drake football team of 1907

Drake University began its athletics program in 1893 with football, baseball, and men's track. The men's basketball program began in 1906. In 1907, Drake joined the Missouri Valley Conference, having previously played as an independent. The teams were known as "The Drakes" until 1908, when John L. Griffith, the newly appointed football coach, brought English Bulldogs to the sidelines of games, prompting Des Moines Register sports editor Art Gordon to dub the teams "the Bulldogs". Drake's live mascot, Griff, is named for Griffith as a result.

Griffith was later instrumental in another major component of Drake athletics when he organized the first Drake Relays in 1910. The Relays moved to Drake Stadium when it opened in 1925.

Drake played the first-ever night game at Soldier Field in 1930, falling to Oregon 14-7.

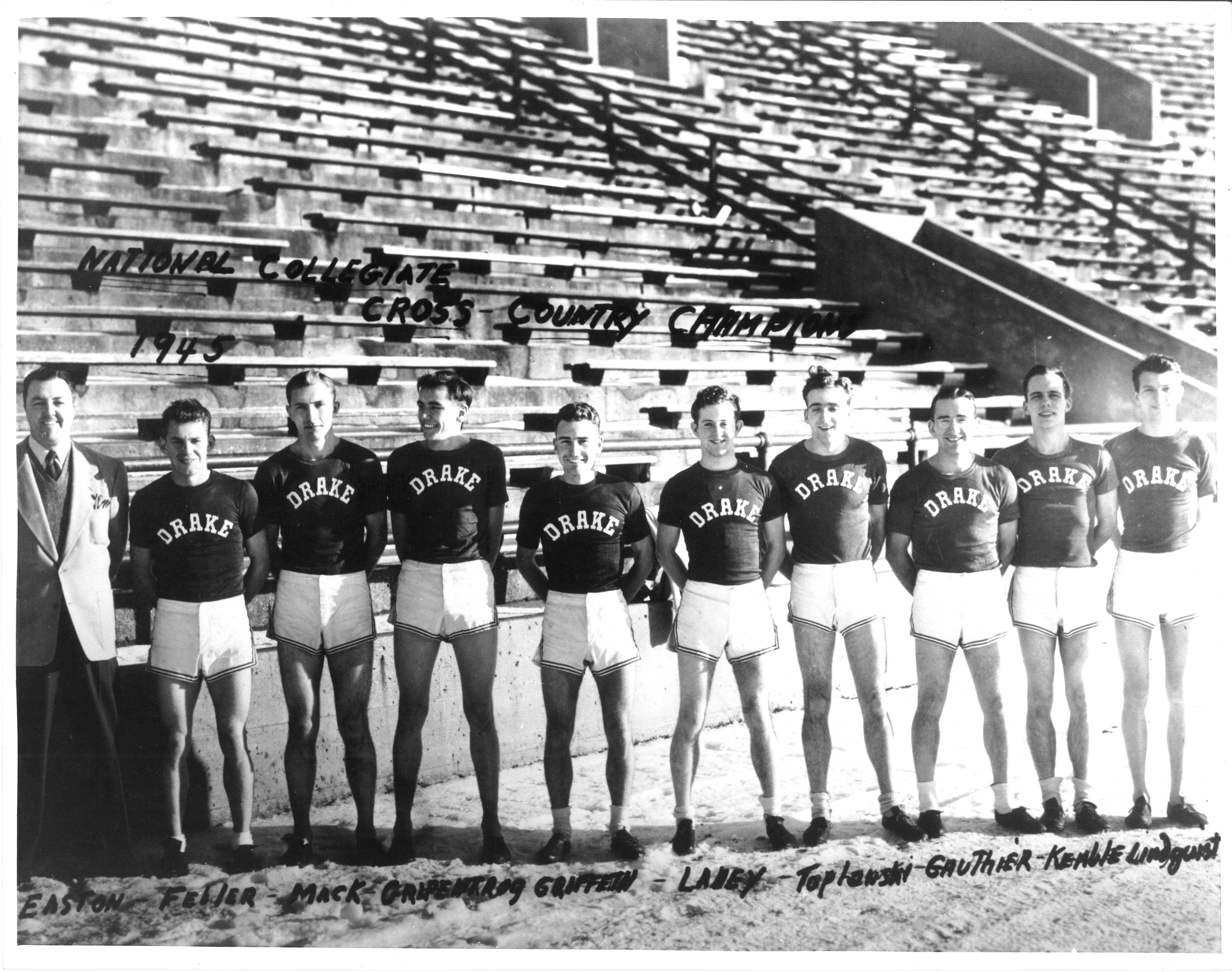
Drake's cross country team of 1945

Drake won the national championships for cross country in 1944, 1945, and 1946, with Fred Feiler winning the individual titles in 1944 and 1945. Feiler became the second Bulldog to win an individual national championship, joining 1935 high jump champion Linn Philson; Drake would later see Jim Ford (1952, 200 meters) and Rick Wanamaker (decathlon, 1970) win individual track titles.

On October 20, 1951, Drake's black football star Johnny Bright was assaulted in a game at Oklahoma A&M (now known as Oklahoma State). As a result of the incident and the failure of the Missouri Valley Conference to take action against Oklahoma A&M or the offending player, Drake and fellow conference member Bradley both withdrew from the conference. Bright would finish 5th in the balloting for the Heisman Trophy. Drake rejoined the Missouri Valley Conference for non-football sports in 1956.

In 1969, the men’s basketball team advanced to the national semifinals, losing narrowly to UCLA. Legend Dolph Pulliam becomes the first athlete to be selected in both the NBA and NFL drafts. Pulliam was drafted by the Boston Celtics and Dallas Cowboys in 1969.

Football returned to the MVC in 1971, 20 years after the Bright incident. Baseball was dropped in 1974. Following changes in NCAA regulation in 1985, football was briefly dropped before returning as a non-scholarship Division III sport; it later returned to Division I but remains non-scholarship.

Alumnus Zach Johnson has won two major championships, the 2007 Masters and the 2015 Open Championship.

== Sports sponsored ==
Drake University athletics began in 1893. and since 1910, the school has been home to and sponsor of what has become one of the world's premier collegiate athletic events, the annual Drake Relays track and field meet held in April.

| Men's sports | Women's sports |
|---|---|
| Basketball | Basketball |
| Cross country | Cross country |
| Football | Golf |
| Golf | Rowing |
| Soccer | Soccer |
| Tennis | Softball |
| Track and field^{1} | Tennis |
| | Track and field^{1} |
| | Volleyball |
^{1} – Track and field includes both indoor and outdoor.

== Drake Relays ==
Drake University also hosts the Drake Relays during April. This track and field event has been held since 1910, and, after the NCAA Championships, is the second-largest collegiate track and field event in the United States. Participants come from all over the world to compete in this three-day event, which also helps to draw large crowds of spectators to Des Moines. Many Olympic athletes can be found participating in these events, which commonly break national and world records.

== Facilities ==
| Facility | Year Opened | Sport | Capacity |
|---|---|---|---|
| Drake Stadium | 1925 | Football, Track & Field | 14,557 |
| Knapp Center | 1992 | Basketball, Volleyball | 7,152 |
| Rodger Knapp Tennis Center | 1992 | Tennis | 1,000 |
| Buel Field | 2005 | Softball | 1,000 |
| Mediacom Stadium | 2023 | Soccer | 4,000 |

== Notable Bulldogs ==
- Johnny Bright – football player
- Billy Cundiff – football player
- Adam Emmenecker – basketball player
- Eric Saubert - football player, Super Bowl LX Champion
- York Hentschel – football player
- Zach Johnson – professional golfer
- Karl Kassulke – football player
- Lewis Lloyd – basketball player
- Al McCoy – sports broadcaster
- McCoy McLemore – basketball player
- Bob Netolicky – basketball player
- Dolph Pulliam – basketball player
- Lee Stange – baseball player
- Bill Stevenson – football player
- Danielle Tyler - softball player
- Willie Wise – basketball player
- Felix Wright – football player
- Wanda Ford – basketball player
- Lorri Bauman – basketball player
- Willie McCarter - basketball player

=== Olympians ===
| Games | Athlete | Nat. | Sport |
|---|---|---|---|
| 1948 | Don Pettie | CAN | 100 meters, 200 meters |
| 1952 | Arnold Betton | USA | High Jump |
| 1952 | James Lavery | CAN | 400 meters, 4x400 relay |
| 1960 | Bob Soth | USA | 5,000 meters |
| 1996 | Dani Tyler | USA | softball |
| 2002 | Ann Swisshelm | USA | curling |
| 2014 | Ann Swisshelm | USA | curling |
