= Dani Tyler =

American softball player

Personal information
- Born: October 23, 1974 (age 51) River Forest, Illinois, U.S.
Medal record
Women's softball
Representing the United States
Olympic Games
Gold medal – first place	1996 Atlanta	Team competition

Danielle M. "Dani" Tyler (born October 23, 1974) is an American, former collegiate right-handed softball player and Olympic champion, originally from River Forest, Illinois. She played on the infield in several positions for the Drake Bulldogs in the Missouri Valley Conference, where she holds the school and ranks in the conference for career batting average records and was a three-time all-conference honoree. She played for the USA National Team from 1993-98, winning gold medals at the 1996 Atlanta Olympics, the 1998 World Championships, the 1994 Pan American Games qualifier, and the 1995 Super Ball Classic.

== Career ==
She competed at the 1996 Summer Olympics in Atlanta where she received a gold medal with the American team. Tyler collected three hits, scored a run with a triple and a double at the games.

Tyler played softball at Drake University.

Tyler later became an accountant, earning a CPA and working with Bansley & Kiener, LLP near Chicago.

== Statistics ==
=== Drake Bulldogs ===
YEAR	G	AB	R	H	BA	RBI	HR	3B	2B	TB	SLG	BB	SO	SB	SBA
1993	51	154	36	60	.389	28	8	1	8	94	.610%	9	14	0	0
1994	56	190	36	73	.384	50	9	3	17	123	.647%	6	8	2	2
1995	52	168	33	69	.410	37	4	1	11	94	.559%	17	5	2	2
TOTALS	159	512	105	202	.394	115	21	5	36	311	.607%	32	27	4	4
