= John Dornon =

American football coach

Biographical details
- Born: February 22, 1940; Harlan, Iowa, U.S.
- Died: January 14, 1996 (aged 55); Sioux City, Iowa, U.S.

Coaching career (HC unless noted)
- 1974–1976: Morningside

Head coaching record
- Overall: 4–22–1

John Dornon (February 22, 1940 – January 14, 1996) was an American football coach. He was the head football coach at Morningside College in Sioux City, Iowa. He held that position for three seasons, from 1974 until 1976. His coaching record at Morningside was 4–22–1.

== Head coaching record ==
Year	Team	Overall	Conference	Standing	Bowl/playoffs
Morningside Maroons (North Central Conference) (1974–1976)
1974	Morningside	0–9	0–7	8th	
1975	Morningside	3–6	2–5	T–5th	
1976	Morningside	1–7–1	0–5–1	7th	
Morningside:		4–22–1	2–17–1		
Total:		4–22–1			
