= Robert Van Horne (American football) =

American football coach

Coaching career (HC unless noted)
- 1898–1900: Morningside

Head coaching record
- Overall: 2–3–1

Robert Van Horne was an American college football coach. He was the first head football coach at Morningside College in Sioux City, Iowa. He held that position for the 1898 and 1900 seasons; there was no team on record for the 1899 season.

== Head coaching record ==
Year	Team	Overall	Conference	Standing	Bowl/playoffs
Morningside (Independent) (1898–1900)
1898	Morningside	0–1–1			
1899	No team				
1900	Morningside	2–2			
Morningside:		2–3–1			
Total:		2–3–1			
