= Russell Hughes (American football) =

American football coach (1914–1998)

Biographical details
- Born: February 18, 1914; Sutherland, Iowa, U.S.
- Died: February 8, 1998 (aged 83); Grinnell, Iowa, U.S.

Coaching career (HC unless noted)
- 1945: Morningside

Head coaching record
- Overall: 2–2–1

Russell B. Hughes (February 18, 1914 – February 8, 1998) was an American football coach. He was the head football coach at Morningside College in Sioux City, Iowa. He held that position for the 1945 season. His coaching record at Morningside 2–2–1.

Hughes later became a farmer. He died from complications of Alzheimer's on February 8, 1998, at the age of 83.

== Head coaching record ==
Year	Team	Overall	Conference	Standing	Bowl/playoffs
Morningside Maroons (North Central Conference) (1945)
1945	Morningside	2–2–1	NA	NA	
Morningside:		2–2–1			
Total:		2–2–1			
