= John L. Griffith =

American football player and coach, basketball coach (1877–1944)

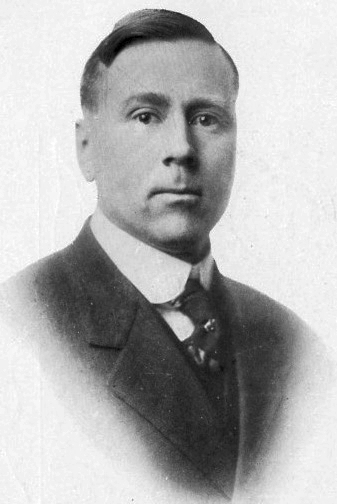
- Griffith pictured in The Quax 1918, Drake yearbook

Biographical details
- Born: August 20, 1877; Mount Carroll, Illinois, U.S.
- Died: December 7, 1944 (aged 67); Chicago, Illinois, U.S.

Playing career
- ?–1902: Beloit

Coaching career (HC unless noted)

Football
- c. 1903: Yankton
- 1905–1907: Morningside
- 1908–1915: Drake

Basketball
- 1909–1910: Drake
- 1912–1914: Drake

Administrative career (AD unless noted)
- 1902–1905: Yankton
- 1905–1908: Morningside
- 1908–1918: Drake
- 1922–1944: Big Ten (commissioner)

Head coaching record
- Overall: 49–31–7 (football, excluding Yankton)

John Lorenzo Griffith (August 20, 1877 – December 7, 1944) was an American football, basketball, and baseball player, track athlete, coach, and college athletics administrator. He served as the first commissioner of the Big Ten Conference from 1922 until his death in 1944.

Griffith attended Beloit College where he competed on the varsity football, baseball, basketball, and track and field teams.

== Coaching career ==
=== Morningside ===
Griffith was the head football coach at Morningside College in Sioux City, Iowa for three seasons, from 1905 until 1907. His coaching record at Morningside was 13–6–4.

=== Drake ===
Griffith was the tenth head football coach at Drake University in Des Moines, Iowa, serving for eight seasons, from 1908 until 1915, compiling a record of 36–25–3. During his time at Drake, he created the Drake Relays, in 1910.

== Head coaching record ==
=== Football ===
Year	Team	Overall	Conference	Standing	Bowl/playoffs
Morningside (Independent) (1905–1907)
1905	Morningside	6–1–2			
1906	Morningside	4–2–1			
1907	Morningside	2–3–1			
Morningside:		13–6–4			
Drake Bulldogs (Missouri Valley Intercollegiate Athletic Association) (1908–1915)
1908	Drake	6–2	1–2	5th	
1909	Drake	7–1	2–1	3rd	
1910	Drake	3–5	0–3	7th	
1911	Drake	5–2–1	0–2–1	6th	
1912	Drake	5–3	2–2	3rd	
1913	Drake	4–3–1	1–3	5th	
1914	Drake	4–3–1	0–3–1	T–5th	
1915	Drake	2–6	1–4	6th	
Drake:		36–25–3	7–20–2		
Total:					

== Personal life ==
He married Allice Kelley on 17 Aug 1904. Alice was born 8 Nov 1879 in Waterford WI to Frances Beardsley Kelley and John Lawrence Kelley. She graduated Beloit College in Beloit, WI in 1901, and taught school. Alice died 20 Dec 1961 and is buried beside her husband in Oakhill Cemetery, Mount Carroll, Carroll County, Illinois. They had one child, John Lawrence Grffith, who was born in 1916 and died in 1984. He married Katherine Johnson who was born in 1917 and died in 2001. They both are interred in the Church of the Holy Comforter Columbarium in Winnetka IL.
