= Les Davis =

American football coach

Biographical details
- Born: July 31, 1900
- Died: February 26, 1966 (aged 65)

Coaching career (HC unless noted)
- 1946–1947: Morningside

Head coaching record
- Overall: 7–9–1

Leslie H. Davis (July 31, 1900 – February 26, 1966) was an American football coach. He was the head football coach at Morningside College in Sioux City, Iowa. He held that position for the 1946 and 1947 seasons. His coaching record at Morningside was 7–9–1.

== Head coaching record ==
Year	Team	Overall	Conference	Standing	Bowl/playoffs
Morningside Maroons (North Central Conference) (1946–1947)
1946	Morningside	3–5–1	2–3–1	5th	
1947	Morningside	4–4	0–4	6th	
Morningside:		7–9–1	2–7–1		
Total:		7–9–1			
