= Dave Dolch =

American football player and coach (born 1955)

Biographical details
- Born: April 30, 1955 (age 71)

Playing career
- c. 1975: Western Maryland
- Position: Defensive back

Coaching career (HC unless noted)
- 1977–1978: Western Maryland (assistant)
- 1979–1982: Queen Anne's HS (MD)
- 1983–1984: Northern Colorado (assistant)
- 1985: Delaware State (assistant)
- 1986–1988: Bowie State
- 1989–1992: Morningside

Head coaching record
- Overall: 28–43–3 (college)
- Tournaments: 0–1 (NCAA D-II playoffs)

Dave Dolch (born April 30, 1955) is an American former football coach. He served as the head football coach at was the head football coach at Bowie State University in Bowie, Maryland from 1986 to 1988 and in Morningside College in Sioux City, Iowa from 1989 to 1992, compiling a career college football coaching record of 28–43–3.

Dolch graduated in 1973 from Northeast High School in Pasadena, Maryland. He then played college football at Western Maryland College—now known as McDaniel College—in Westminster, Maryland and was captain of the Green Terror as a senior.

== Head coaching record ==
=== College ===
Year	Team	Overall	Conference	Standing	Bowl/playoffs	NCAA^{#}
Bowie State Bulldogs (Central Intercollegiate Athletic Association) (1986–1988)
1986	Bowie State	0–9	0–7	6th (Southern)		
1987	Bowie State	4–6–1	2–4–1	5th (Southern)		
1988	Bowie State	8–2–1	4–1–1	T–2nd (Southern)	L NCAA Division II First Round	20
Bowie State:		12–17–2	6–12–2			
Morningside Chiefs (North Central Conference) (1989–1992)
1989	Morningside	2–9	0–9	10th		
1990	Morningside	7–4	5–4	T–4th		
1991	Morningside	2–8	1–7	T–8th		
1992	Morningside	5–5–1	4–4–1	6th		
Morningside:		16–26–1	10–24–1			
Total:		28–43–3				
^{#}Rankings from final NCAA Division II Football Committee poll.
