= Drake Relays =

American annual track and field competition

- Conference: Missouri Valley
- Sport: Track and field
- Founder: 1910; 116 years ago
- Organizing body: Drake University
- Related competitions: Penn Relays
- Website: godrakebulldogs.com/relays

The Drake Relays is an outdoor track and field event held in Des Moines, Iowa, in Drake Stadium on the campus of Drake University. Billed as America's Athletic Classic, it is regarded as one of the top track and field events in the United States. In 2020, the Drake Relays was named a Silver Level event on the World Athletics Continental Tour, one of only two competitions in the United States to earn Silver Level status.

== History ==
The inaugural Drake Relays were held in 1910. The first meet drew just 100 spectators and 82 athletes, all from Des Moines-area colleges and high schools. The second year attendance grew to 250 athletes and a crowd of some 500 spectators. In 1914, the Relays saw its first world record set. By 1922, the Relays had expanded to two days and drew 10,000 fans, becoming the first major track and field event broadcast on radio. For the 1926 Relays, Drake Stadium was built on the site of the prior host, Haskins Field.

Women's events were added beginning in 1961 with Wilma Rudolph competing in the 100 meters. The 1966 Relays began a streak of 48 consecutive Saturdays with a sellout. In 1969, a $175,000 tartan track was installed. The events at the Relays would go all-metric in 1976 and the track was rebuilt as a 400-meter oval in 1978. It was resurfaced in 1983, and in 1988 was renamed the "Jim Duncan Track" to honor the long time relays public address announcer.

Hundreds of Olympic gold medalists have competed at Drake Stadium including Caitlyn Jenner, Michael Johnson, Carl Lewis, Jesse Owens, Wilma Rudolph, Frank Shorter, Gwen Torrence, and Jeremy Wariner. Hundreds more Drake Relays competitors have gone onto compete in the Olympic Games, including 113 at the 2012 Olympic Games.

In 2006, a Friday evening session was added. In 2010, the Grand Blue Mile, a one-mile road race in downtown Des Moines, was added. The week of festivities currently opens with a parade on Saturday, continues with a Beautiful Bulldog Contest (Drake's mascot) on Sunday, the Grand Blue Mile on Tuesday, and an indoor pole vault on Wednesday with the decathlon and heptathlon beginning Wednesday and concluding alongside the distance carnival on Thursday.

Midwest grocer Hy-Vee became the presenting sponsor beginning in 2013, enabling the Relays to offer a $50,000 purse in running events and $25,000 purse in field events, making the Drake Relays the richest athletics event in the United States. ESPN2 aired 90 minutes of live-action coverage that year and ESPN3 aired an additional two hours. The 2013 field saw 25 Olympic medalists compete. Currently NBCSN airs 2–3 hours of coverage on Saturday with live online coverage via NBCSports.com throughout the event.

In January 2018 Drake Relays unveiled the Blue Standard, under which Iowa's top high school athletes automatically qualify based on their event performance. The Blue Standard is the top 25 percent of accepted entrant's results from past Drake Relays.

In March 2020, Xtream powered by Mediacom was named the presenting sponsor of the Drake Relays. Xtream's sponsorship allows the Drake Relays to maintain its status as a premier track and field event, to be called the "Drake Relays presented by Xtream powered by Mediacom".

In addition to the track meet, the Relays serves as a second homecoming for the university and sees other community events such as student street painting and a downtown Des Moines block party.

== Drake Stadium ==
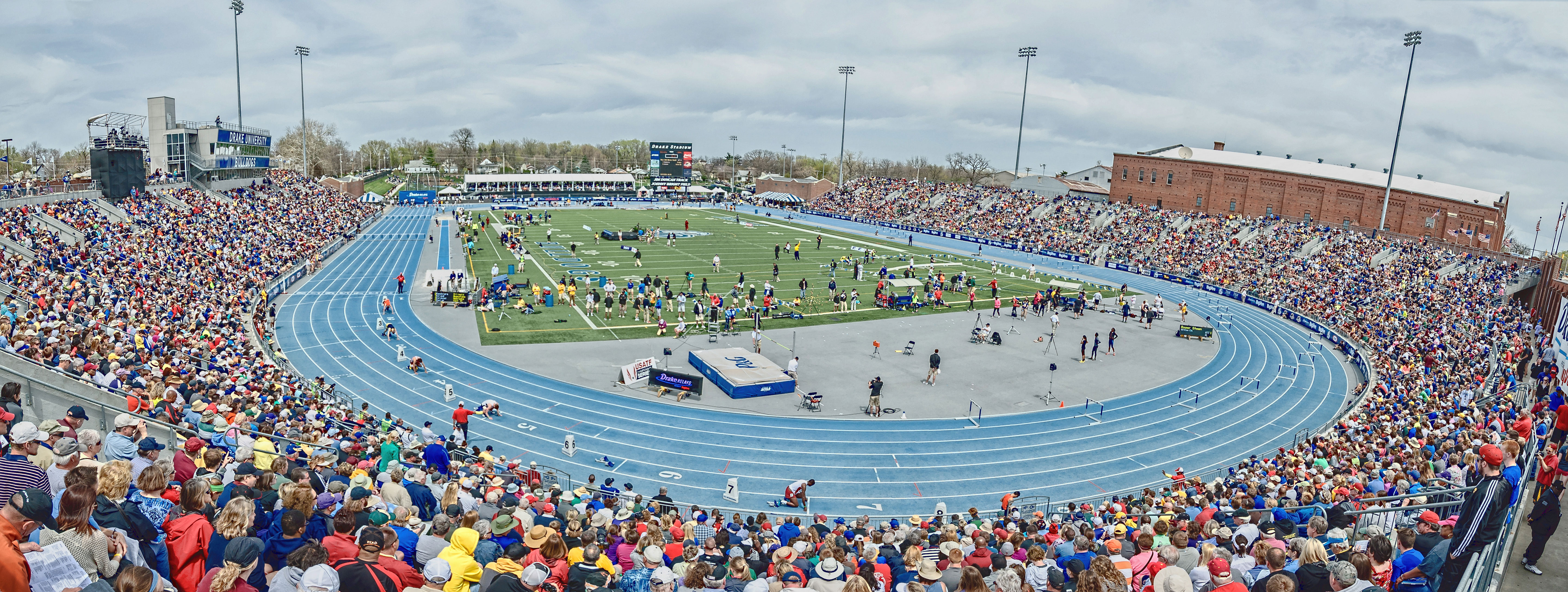
Drake Stadium during the Saturday session of the 2014 Drake Relays

Opened in 1925, the 14,557-seat stadium and its famous blue oval have hosted the Relays since 1926. A $15 million renovation in 2006 reduced capacity from 18,000 seats in order to expand the lanes, allow fans to watch throwing and running at the same time, and allow for more hosting of events. Another renovation following the 2016 relays saw a new track installed, constructed of the same material used for tracks in Beijing and London for the Summer Olympics.

== Directors ==
Eleven men have claimed the role of director of the Drake Relays since the very first officially organized track and field event took place more than 100 years ago back in the year 1910.

- John L. Griffith 1910–1918
  Griffith was the founder of the Drake Relays. He remained director for nine years and moved to the University of Illinois after World War I. He later became commissioner of the Big Ten Conference. Drake's live bulldog mascot, Griff, is named for him.
- M. B. Banks 1919–1921
  Banks also served as coach to the Drake football and basketball teams.
- K. L. (Tug) Wilson 1922–1925
  Wilson was a former Illinois and Olympic athlete. After his tenure as director, he went on to become athletic director at Northwestern University. Wilson was also a former Big Ten Conference commissioner.
- O. M. (Ossie) Solem 1926–1932
  Longtime Drake coach succeeded Wilson, later became head football coach at the University of Iowa and Syracuse University
- F. P. (Pitch) Johnson 1933–1940
- M. E. (Bill) Easton 1941–1947
- Tom Deckard 1948–1955
- Bob Karnes 1956–1969
- Bob Ehrhart 1970–2000
- Mark Kostek 2001–2005
- Brian Brown 2006–2016
  Brown participated in the relays himself and held the Drake Relays record in the high jump until 2014. For his first eight years as director, Brown had attempted to have his record broken by recruiting some of the best high jumpers in the country.
- Blake Boldon 2017–present

== Meet records ==
=== Men ===
Men's meeting records of the Drake Relays
Event	Record	Athlete	Nation.	Date	Ref.
100 m	10.01 (+1.9 m/s)	Harvey Glance	United States	24 April 1976	
200 m	20.02 (+1.7 m/s)	Wallace Spearmon	United States	28 April 2012	
400 m	44.08	Kirani James	Grenada	29 April 2016	
800 m	1:45.86	Randy Wilson	United States	28 April 1978	
1500 m	3:38.27	Steve Scott	United States	28 April 1984	
Mile	3:51.71	Alan Webb	United States	28 April 2007	
5000 m	13:21.39	Morgan McDonald	Australia	23 April 2021	
10,000 m	28:07.40	Kipsubai Koskei	Kenya	26 April 1980	
110 m hurdles	13.04 (+1.8 m/s)	Omar McLeod	Jamaica	29 April 2017	
400 m hurdles	48.15	Alison dos Santos	Brazil	24 April 2021	
3000 m steeplechase	8:31.02	Henry Marsh	United States	30 April 1977	
High jump	2.40 m (7 ft 10 1/4 in)	Derek Drouin	Canada	25 April 2014	
Pole vault	5.90 m (19 ft 4 1/4 in)	KC Lightfoot	United States	22 April 2024	
Long jump	8.26 m (27 ft 1 in)	Anthuan Maybank	United States	24 April 1993	
Triple jump	17.12 m (56 ft 2 in)	Christian Taylor	United States	27 April 2013	
Shot put	22.59 m (74 ft 1 1/4 in)	Payton Otterdahl	United States	24 April 2024	
Discus throw	64.59 m (211 ft 10 3/4 in)	Reggie Jagers	United States	28 April 2018	
Hammer throw	81.08 m (266 ft 0 in)	Rudy Winkler	United States	24 April 2025	
Decathlon	8265 pts	Till Steinforth	Germany	23–24 April 2025	
Decathlon	100m / Long jump / Shot put / High jump / 400m / 110m H / Discus / Pole vault / Javelin / 1500m; 10.65 (+1.4 m/s) / 7.90 m (+4.0 m/s) / 15.28 m / 1.98 m / 47.96 / 14.09 (+0.8 m/s) / 41.44 m / 4.75 m / 56.02 m / 4:50.10				
4 × 100 m relay	38.96	University of Alabama: Emmit King; Lamar Smith; Calvin Smith; Walter Monroe	United States; United States; United States; United States	30 April 1983	
4 × 200 m relay	1:20.53	University of Texas-El Paso: Obadele Thompson; Milton Mallard; Hayden Stephen; Andrew Tynes	Barbados; United States; United States; Bahamas	30 April 1994	
4 × 400 m relay	3:00.78	Southern Illinois University: Parry Duncan; Tony Adams; Elvis Forde; Michael Franks	United States; United States; Barbados; United States	28 April 1984	
Sprint medley relay (2,2,4,8)	3:12.19	Alabama State University: Lamar Smith; Calvin Smith; Terry Menefee; William Wuyke	United States; United States; United States; Venezuela	30 April 1983	
4 × 800 m relay	7:12.57	Iowa State University: Jason Gomez; Joven Nelson; Daniel Nixon; Festus Lagat	United States; United States; United States; Kenya	23 April 2021	
Distance medley relay	9:30.45	Southern Methodist University: Rob Topping; Russell Mitchell; Ben Bor; Paul Rugut	United States; United States Kenya	30 April 1983	
4×110 m Shuttle hurdles relay	52.94	USA Blue: Jason Richardson; Aleec Harris; Aries Merritt; David Oliver	United States; United States; United States; United States	25 April 2015	

=== Women ===
Women's meeting records of the Drake Relays
Event	Record	Athlete	Nation.	Date	Ref.
100 m	11.06 (±0.0 m/s)	LaShauntea Moore	United States	24 April 2010	
200 m	22.40 (+0.7 m/s)	Gwen Torrence	United States	30 April 1994	
400 m	50.13	Francena McCorory	United States	25 April 2015	
800 m	2:00.03	Ajee' Wilson	United States	24 April 2015	
1500 m	4:03.35	Jennifer Simpson	United States	26 April 2013	
Mile	4:23.69	Krissy Gear	United States	26 April 2025	
3000 m	8:56.03	Suzy Favor-Hamilton	United States	27 April 2002	
Two miles	9:16.78	Jennifer Simpson	United States	27 April 2018	
5000 m	15:23.21	Karissa Schweizer	United States	26 April 2018	
10,000 m	32:57.38	Patti Murray	United States	28 April 1988	
100 m hurdles	12.40 (+1.5 m/s)	Jasmin Stowers	United States	25 April 2015	
400 m hurdles	53.88	Dalilah Muhammad	United States	30 April 2022	
3000 m steeplechase	9:32.23	Leah Falland	United States	26 April 2018	
High jump	1.98 m (6 ft 5 3/4 in)	Chaunte Lowe	United States	28 April 2012	
Pole vault	4.88 m (16 ft 0 in)	Sandi Morris	United States	28 April 2018	
Long jump	6.78 m (22 ft 2 3/4 in)	Aisha James	United States	26 April 2003	
Triple jump	13.79 m (45 ft 2 3/4 in)	Shani Marks	United States	26 April 2003	
Shot put	19.37 m (63 ft 6 1/2 in)	Tia Brooks	United States	29 April 2016	
Discus throw	64.38 m (211 ft 2 1/2 in)	Becky Breisch	United States	24 April 2010	
Hammer throw	78.69 m (258 ft 2 in)	Brooke Andersen	United States	27 April 2023	
Heptathlon	6040 pts	Diana Pickler	United States	21–22 April 2009	
Heptathlon	100m H / High jump / Shot put / 200m / Long jump / Javelin / 800m; 13.63 (±0.0 m/s) / 1.78 m / 12.08 m / 24.48 (+1.7 m/s) / 6.14 m (+1.0 m/s) / 41.39 m / 2:16.73				
4 × 100 m relay	43.58	University of Texas: Morgan Snow; Allison Peter; Christy Udoh; Chalonda Goodman	United States; United States Virgin Islands; Nigeria; United States	28 April 2012	
4 × 200 m relay	1:31.96	Texas Southern University: Linda Eseimokumoh; Beatrice Utondu; Dyan Webber; Mary Onyali	Nigeria; Nigeria; United States; Nigeria	28 April 1989	
4 × 400 m relay	3:28.42	Purdue University: Chole Abbot; Brionna Thomas; Symone Black; Jahneya Mitchell	United States; United States; United States; United States	28 April 2018	
Sprint medley relay (2-2-4-8)	3:43.64	Arkansas State University: Regine Williams; Daina Harper; Taylor Ellis-Watson; Chrishuna Williams	United States; United States; United States; United States	25 April 2015	
4 × 800 m relay	8:27.42	University of Minnesota: Julie Schwengler; Jamie Cheever; Gabrielle Anderson; Heather Dorniden	United States; United States; United States; United States	27 April 2007	
Distance medley relay	11:03.25	Notre Dame University: Olivia Markezich; Kelly Hart; Erin Sullivan; Katie Wasserman	United States; United States; United States; United States	24 April 2021	
4 × 100 m Shuttle hurdles relay	50.50	USA Blue: Brianna Rollins; Dawn Harper-Nelson; Queen Harrison; Kristi Castlin	United States; United States; United States; United States	24 April 2015	

=== Mixed ===
Mixed meeting records of the Drake Relays
Event	Record	Athlete	Nation.	Date	Ref.
4 × 110 m Shuttle hurdles relay	54.42	Team Blue: Kristi Castlin; Spencer Adams; Nia Ali; Eddie Lovett	United States; United States; United States; United States Virgin Islands	30 April 2016	

== Results ==
2020s	2010s	2000s	1990s	1980s	1970s	1960s	1950s	1940s	1930s	1920s	1910s
2029	2019	2009	1999	1989	1979	1969	1959	1949	1939	1929	1919
2028	2018	2008	1998	1988	1978	1968	1958	1948	1938	1928	1918
2027	2017	2007	1997	1987	1977	1967	1957	1947	1937	1927	1917
2026	2016	2006	1996	1986	1976	1966	1956	1946	1936	1926	1916
2025	2015	2005	1995	1985	1975	1965	1955	1945	1935	1925	1915
2024	2014	2004	1994	1984	1974	1964	1954	1944	1934	1924	1914
2023	2013	2003	1993	1983	1973	1963	1953	1943	1933	1923	1913
2022	2012	2002	1992	1982	1972	1962	1952	1942	1932	1922	1912
2021	2011	2001	1991	1981	1971	1961	1951	1941	1931	1921	1911
2020	2010	2000	1990	1980	1970	1960	1950	1940	1930	1920	1910

== Future dates ==
- 117th Drake Relays - April 21–24, 2027
- 118th Drake Relays - April 26–29, 2028
