= 1972 New York Jets season =

1972 season of NFL team New York Jets

- Owner: Leon Hess
- Head coach: Weeb Ewbank
- Home stadium: Shea Stadium

Results
- Record: 7–7
- Division place: 2nd AFC East
- Playoffs: Did not qualify
- Pro Bowlers: T Winston Hill; WR Jerome Barkum; QB Joe Namath

The 1972 New York Jets season was the 13th season for the team and the third in the National Football League. It began with the team trying to improve upon its 6–8 record from 1971 under head coach Weeb Ewbank. The Jets star quarterback Joe Namath was healthy for a full season for the first time in three years but the rest of the squad was decimated by injuries and, after a strong start, the Jets finished with a record of 7–7.

During the 1972 preseason, a squad composed of the Jets’ rookies defeated the Long Island Chiefs of the Seaboard Football League, 29–3.(In 1974, the Houston Oilers rookie squad played a preseason game vs the minor league San Antonio Toros)

Namath threw for 496 yards and six touchdowns (on 15 of 28 passes) in a 44–34 victory over the Baltimore Colts in his first appearance at Baltimore’s Memorial Stadium in week two, but the next week, the Jets were humbled 26–20 by Houston, the Oilers' only victory of 1972 and their last before embarking on an 18-game losing streak.

The Jets were eliminated from playoff contention in the season’s thirteenth week, a Monday Night Game with the Raiders in which a battered and bruised Namath threw for 403 yards and nearly pulled off the upset. After the game Raiders coach John Madden went into the Jets locker room and shook Namath’s hand out of respect; it was the only time in his coaching career Madden ever did that. Eliminated from postseason play, the Jets’ coaches decided Namath would sit out the final game of the season to make sure no serious injuries were incurred prior to the 1973 season.

== Offseason ==
=== Draft ===
1972 New York Jets draft
| Round | Pick | Player | Position | College | Notes |
| 1 | 9 | Jerome Barkum * | Wide receiver | Jackson State | |
| 1 | 23 | Mike Taylor | Linebacker | Michigan | |
| 3 | 66 | Gary Hammond | Wide receiver | SMU | |
| 4 | 89 | Ed Galigher | Defensive tackle | UCLA | |
Made roster † Pro Football Hall of Fame * Made at least one Pro Bowl during career

== Roster ==
1972 New York Jets roster
| Quarterbacks (QB): 15 Bob Davis; 12 Joe Namath; 18 Al Woodall; Running backs (RB): 40 Hank Bjorklund; 32 Emerson Boozer; 36 Steve Harkey; 42 Cliff McClain; Wide receivers (WR): 83 Jerome Barkum; 7 Eddie Bell; 13 Don Maynard; 29 Rocky Turner; Tight ends (TE): 88 Rich Caster; 89 Wayne Stewart | Offensive linemen (OL): 61 Roger Finnie G; 75 Winston Hill T; 67 Dave Herman G; 71 John Mooring T; 66 Randy Rasmussen G; 52 John Schmitt C; 76 Bob Svihus T; Defensive linemen (DL): 80 John Elliott DT; 86 Joey Jackson DE; 57 John Little DT; 84 Mark Lomas DE; 81 Gerry Philbin DE; 53 Bill Zapalac DE | Linebackers (LB): 62 Al Atkinson MLB; 51 Ralph Baker OLB; 55 John Ebersole MLB; 60 Larry Grantham OLB; 50 Mike Taylor OLB; Defensive backs (DB): 19 Chris Farasopoulos FS; 33 W. K. Hicks FS; 48 Gus Hollomon SS; 46 Rich Sowells CB; 21 Steve Tannen CB; 45 Earlie Thomas CB; 27 Phil Wise SS; Special teams (ST): 3 Bobby Howfield K; 20 Steve O'Neal P | Practice squad: 82 Gary Arthur TE; 17 Gary Hammond WR; 44 John Riggins RB; Reserve: -- Richard Ciemny K (Left squad); 56 Paul Crane LB (IR); 85 Ed Galigher DT (IR); 63 Roy Kirksey G (IR); 41 Matt Snell RB (IR); 85 Steve Thompson DT (IR); Rookies in italics |

== Regular season ==
=== Schedule ===
| Week | Date | Opponent | Result | Record | Venue | Attendance |
|---|---|---|---|---|---|---|
| 1 | September 17 | at **Buffalo Bills** | **W** 41–24 | 1–0 | War Memorial Stadium | 46,206 |
| 2 | September 24 | at **Baltimore Colts** | **W** 44–34 | 2–0 | Memorial Stadium | 56,626 |
| 3 | October 1 | at Houston Oilers | **L** 20–26 | 2–1 | Astrodome | 51,423 |
| 4 | October 8 | **Miami Dolphins** | **L** 17–27 | 2–2 | Shea Stadium | 63,841 |
| 5 | October 15 | at **New England Patriots** | **W** 41–13 | 3–2 | Schaefer Stadium | 60,999 |
| 6 | October 22 | **Baltimore Colts** | **W** 24–20 | 4–2 | Shea Stadium | 62,948 |
| 7 | October 29 | **New England Patriots** | **W** 34–10 | 5–2 | Shea Stadium | 62,867 |
| 8 | November 5 | Washington Redskins | **L** 17–35 | 5–3 | Shea Stadium | 63,962 |
| 9 | November 12 | **Buffalo Bills** | **W** 41–3 | 6–3 | Shea Stadium | 62,853 |
| 10 | November 19 | at **Miami Dolphins** | **L** 24–28 | 6–4 | Miami Orange Bowl | 80,010 |
| 11 | November 23 | at Detroit Lions | **L** 20–37 | 6–5 | Tiger Stadium | 54,418 |
| 12 | December 3 | New Orleans Saints | **W** 18–17 | 7–5 | Shea Stadium | 62,496 |
| 13 | December 11 | at Oakland Raiders | **L** 16–24 | 7–6 | Oakland–Alameda County Coliseum | 54,843 |
| 14 | December 17 | Cleveland Browns | **L** 10–26 | 7–7 | Shea Stadium | 62,614 |
Note: Intra-division opponents are in **bold** text.

=== Game summaries ===
==== Week 2: at Baltimore Colts ====
New York Jets at Baltimore Colts

| Team | 1 | 2 | 3 | 4 | Total |
|---|---|---|---|---|---|
| • **Jets** | 6 | 21 | 3 | 14 | 44 |
| Colts | 7 | 13 | 0 | 14 | 34 |

- Date: September 24
- Location: Memorial Stadium, Baltimore, Maryland
- Game start: 2:00 p.m. EDT
- Game weather: 63 °F (17.2 °C), wind 8 miles per hour (13 km/h; 7.0 kn)
- Referee: Ben Dreith
- TV announcers (NBC): Charlie Jones and Sam DeLuca

Scoring summary
| 1 | Jets | Eddie Bell 65 yard pass from Joe Namath (kick failed) | Jets 6–0 |
| 1 | Colts | Sam Havrilak 40 yard pass from Johnny Unitas (Jim O'Brien kick) | Colts 7–6 |
| 2 | Colts | Jim O'Brien 14 yard field goal | Colts 10–6 |
| 2 | Colts | Jim O'Brien 32 yard field goal | Colts 13–6 |
| 2 | Jets | John Riggins 67 yard pass from Joe Namath (Bobby Howfield kick) | Tie 13–13 |
| 2 | Colts | Don McCauley 93 yard kickoff return (Jim O'Brien kick) | Colts 20–13 |
| 2 | Jets | Don Maynard 28 yard pass from Joe Namath (Bobby Howfield kick) | Tie 20–20 |
| 2 | Jets | Rich Caster 10 yard pass from Joe Namath (Bobby Howfield kick) | Jets 27–20 |
| 3 | Jets | Bobby Howfield 14 yard field goal | Jets 30–20 |
| 4 | Colts | Don McCauley 1 yard run (Jim O'Brien kick) | Jets 30–27 |
| 4 | Jets | Rich Caster 79 yard pass from Joe Namath (Bobby Howfield kick) | Jets 37–27 |
| 4 | Colts | Tom Matte 21 yard pass from Johnny Unitas (Jim O'Brien kick) | Jets 37–34 |
| 4 | Jets | Rich Caster 80 yard pass from Joe Namath (Bobby Howfield kick) | Jets 44–34 |

The rivalry between Joe Namath and Johnny Unitas had never resulted in both quarterbacks meeting for a full game until this meeting. Namath and Unitas exploded to a combined 872 passing yards. Namath threw for 496 yards and six touchdowns despite only 15 completions in 28 attempts. Unitas scored twice but was sacked six times. Don McCauley also scored twice for the Colts as the Jets won 44–34.

=== Standings ===
AFC East
| | W | L | T | PCT | DIV | CONF | PF | PA | STK |
|---|---|---|---|---|---|---|---|---|---|
| Miami Dolphins | 14 | 0 | 0 | 1.000 | 8–0 | 11–0 | 385 | 171 | W14 |
| New York Jets | 7 | 7 | 0 | .500 | 6–2 | 6–5 | 367 | 324 | L2 |
| Baltimore Colts | 5 | 9 | 0 | .357 | 4–4 | 5–6 | 235 | 252 | L2 |
| Buffalo Bills | 4 | 9 | 1 | .321 | 2–6 | 2–9 | 257 | 377 | W1 |
| New England Patriots | 3 | 11 | 0 | .214 | 0–8 | 0–11 | 192 | 446 | L1 |
