= 1971 New York Jets season =

1971 season of NFL team New York Jets

- Owner: Leon Hess
- Head coach: Weeb Ewbank
- Home stadium: Shea Stadium

Results
- Record: 6–8
- Division place: 3rd AFC East
- Playoffs: Did not qualify
- Pro Bowlers: T Winston Hill

The 1971 New York Jets season was the twelfth season for the team and the second in the National Football League. It began with the team trying to improve upon its 4–10 record from 1970 under head coach Weeb Ewbank.

Disaster struck before the regular season started and the Jets finished 6–8. Joe Namath was injured in a preseason game against the Detroit Lions and required knee surgery, All-Pro WR George Sauer, Jr unexpectedly retired at the peak of his career, and All-Pro defensive end Verlon Biggs exercised his option and signed with the Washington Redskins.

After missing nineteen consecutive Jets games in 1970 and 1971, Namath returned to action against the San Francisco 49ers in the third quarter (November 28, 1971) and threw for 258 yards and three touchdowns, but was intercepted by Johnny Fuller in the end zone on the final play of a 24–21 loss. He then started the final three games, and the Jets won the last two after suffering a 52–10 loss in a nationally televised game to the eventual Super Bowl champion Dallas Cowboys.

== Offseason ==
=== NFL draft ===
1971 New York Jets Draft
Round	Pick #	Overall	Name	Position	College
1	6	6	John Riggins	Running back	Kansas
2	6	32	John Mooring	Tackle	Tampa
3	6	58	Chris Farasopoulos	Defensive back	BYU
4	6	84	Bill Zapalac	Linebacker	Texas
6	6	136	Phil Wise	Tight end	Nebraska-Omaha
7	6	162	Scott Palmer	Defensive tackle	Texas
8	6	188	Roy Kirksey	Guard	Maryland State
9	6	214	John Curtis	Tight end	Springfield
10	6	240	Jim Betts	Defensive back	Michigan
11	6	266	Vernon Studdard	Wide receiver	Mississippi
12	6	292	Rich Sowells	Defensive back	Alcorn
13	6	318	John Eggold	Defensive end	Arizona
14	6	344	John Harpring	Guard	Michigan
15	6	370	Dan Dyches	Center	South Carolina
16	6	396	Steve Harkey	Running back	Georgia Tech
17	6	422	Greg Flaska	Defensive end	Western Michigan

== Roster ==
1971 New York Jets roster
Quarterbacks (QB): 15 Bob Davis; 12 Joe Namath; 18 Al Woodall; Running backs (RB): 32 Emerson Boozer; 36 Steve Harkey; 42 Cliff McClain; 37 George Nock; 44 John Riggins; Wide receivers (WR): 7 Eddie Bell; 88 Rich Caster; 13 Don Maynard; 22 Vern Studdard; Tight ends (TE): 82 Gary Arthur; 87 Pete Lammons; 89 Wayne Stewart	Offensive linemen (OL): 70 Dave Foley T; 67 Dave Herman G; 75 Winston Hill T; 71 John Mooring C; 66 Randy Rasmussen G; 52 John Schmitt C; 76 Bob Svihus T; Defensive linemen (DL): 64 Chuck Hinton DT; 57 John Little DT/DE; 84 Mark Lomas DE; 81 Gerry Philbin DE; 53 Bill Zapalac DE	Linebackers (LB): 62 Al Atkinson MLB; 51 Ralph Baker OLB; 56 Paul Crane OLB; 55 John Ebersole MLB; 60 Larry Grantham OLB; Defensive backs (DB): 43 John Dockery CB; 19 Chris Farasopoulos FS; 33 W. K. Hicks FS; 21 Steve Tannen CB; 45 Earlie Thomas CB; 27 Phil Wise SS; Special teams (ST): 3 Bobby Howfield K; 20 Steve O'Neal P	Reserve: 80 John Elliott DT (IR); 61 Roger Finnie DT (IR); 48 Gus Hollomon S (IR); 63 Roy Kirksey G (IR); 72 Scott Palmer DT (IR); 41 Matt Snell RB (IR); 46 Rich Sowells CB (IR); 85 Steve Thompson DT Retired; Rookies in italics

== Regular season ==
=== Schedule ===
Week	Date	Opponent	Result	Record	Venue	Attendance	Recap
1	September 19	at **Baltimore Colts**	**L** 0–22	0–1	Memorial Stadium	56,458	Recap
2	September 27	at St. Louis Cardinals	**L** 10–17	0–2	Busch Memorial Stadium	50,358	Recap
3	October 3	at **Miami Dolphins**	**W** 14–10	1–2	Miami Orange Bowl	70,670	Recap
4	October 10	at **New England Patriots**	**L** 0–20	1–3	Schaefer Stadium	61,357	Recap
5	October 17	**Buffalo Bills**	**W** 28–17	2–3	Shea Stadium	61,948	Recap
6	October 24	**Miami Dolphins**	**L** 14–30	2–4	Shea Stadium	62,130	Recap
7	October 31	at San Diego Chargers	**L** 21–49	2–5	San Diego Stadium	44,786	Recap
8	November 7	Kansas City Chiefs	**W** 13–10	3–5	Shea Stadium	62,812	Recap
9	November 14	**Baltimore Colts**	**L** 13–14	3–6	Shea Stadium	63,947	Recap
10	November 21	at **Buffalo Bills**	**W** 20–7	4–6	War Memorial Stadium	41,577	Recap
11	November 28	San Francisco 49ers	**L** 21–24	4–7	Shea Stadium	63,936	Recap
12	December 4	at Dallas Cowboys	**L** 10–52	4–8	Texas Stadium	66,689	Recap
13	December 12	**New England Patriots**	**W** 13–6	5–8	Shea Stadium	63,175	Recap
14	December 19	Cincinnati Bengals	**W** 35–21	6–8	Shea Stadium	63,151	Recap
Note: Intra-division opponents are in **bold** text.

=== Standings ===
AFC East
	W	L	T	PCT	DIV	CONF	PF	PA	STK
Miami Dolphins	10	3	1	.769	5–3	7–3–1	315	174	W1
Baltimore Colts	10	4	0	.714	6–2	8–3	313	140	L1
New England Patriots	6	8	0	.429	4–4	6–5	238	325	W1
New York Jets	6	8	0	.429	4–4	6–5	212	299	W2
Buffalo Bills	1	13	0	.071	1–7	1–10	184	394	L3

Note: Tie games were not officially counted in the standings until 1972.
