= 1973 New York Jets season =

1973 season of NFL team New York Jets

- Owner: Leon Hess
- Head coach: Weeb Ewbank
- Home stadium: Shea Stadium

Results
- Record: 4–10
- Division place: 4th AFC East
- Playoffs: Did not qualify
- Pro Bowlers: T Winston Hill; WR Jerome Barkum

The 1973 New York Jets season was the fourteenth season for the team and the fourth in the National Football League. It began with the team trying to improve upon its 7–7 record from 1972 under head coach Weeb Ewbank. The Jets finished with a record of 4–10 in the final season under head coach Weeb Ewbank, with their only wins coming against division rivals New England and Baltimore.

The Jets' offense was weakened when quarterback Joe Namath suffered a shoulder injury in the second game. The injury was the third time in four seasons that Namath had been sidelined. Namath did not play again until the second half of the tenth game of the season.

The memorandum of understanding signed by team original owner (as the New York Titans) Harry Wismer gave Shea Stadium's co-tenants, the New York Mets’, exclusive use of the stadium until they had completed their season. The Jets were required to open 1973 with several road games. As the Mets had a long playoff run to the World Series, the Jets' first six games were on the road.

The 1973 season would be the last for legendary coach Weeb Ewbank.

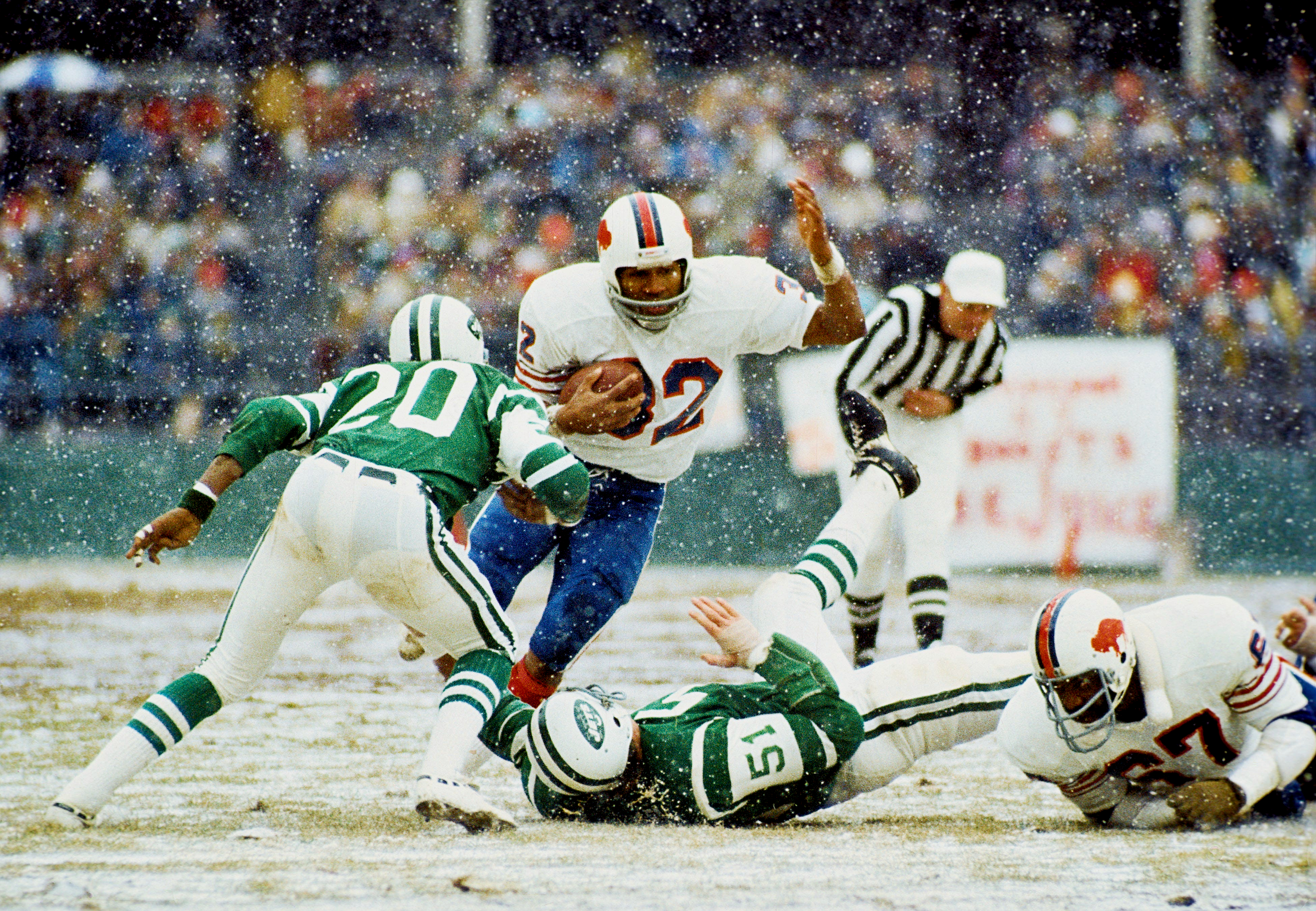
The Jets playing host to the Buffalo Bills at Shea Stadium during a 1973 home game.

== Offseason ==
=== Draft ===
1973 New York Jets draft
Round	Pick	Player	Position	College	Notes
1	13	Burgess Owens	Defensive back	Miami (FL)	
Made roster † Pro Football Hall of Fame * Made at least one Pro Bowl during career

== Roster ==
1973 New York Jets roster
Quarterbacks (QB): 6 Bill Demory; 12 Joe Namath; 18 Al Woodall; Running backs (RB): 1 Mike Adamle; 40 Hank Bjorklund; 32 Emerson Boozer; 42 Cliff McClain; 35 Jim Nance; 44 John Riggins; Wide receivers (WR): 26 Margene Adkins; 83 Jerome Barkum; 7 Eddie Bell; 82 David Knight; Tight ends (TE): 30 Dennis Cambal; 88 Rich Caster	Offensive linemen (OL): 54 Rick Harrell C; 67 Dave Herman G; 75 Winston Hill T; 71 John Mooring T; 78 Garry Puetz G; 66 Randy Rasmussen G; 52 John Schmitt C; 76 Bob Svihus T; 72 Robert Woods T; Defensive linemen (DL): 80 John Elliott DT/DE; 85 Ed Galigher DE; 86 Joey Jackson DE; 57 John Little DT; 84 Mark Lomas DE; 81 Richard Neal DT/DE; 87 Steve Thompson DT	Linebackers (LB): 62 Al Atkinson MLB; 51 Ralph Baker OLB; 55 John Ebersole MLB; 58 Bill Ferguson OLB; 59 Rob Spicer OLB; 50 Mike Taylor OLB; 53 Bill Zapalac OLB; Defensive backs (DB): 20 Delles Howell CB; 22 Burgess Owens SS; 46 Rich Sowells CB; 21 Steve Tannen FS; 45 Earlie Thomas CB; 29 Rocky Turner SS; 27 Phil Wise FS; Special teams (ST): 10 Julian Fagan P; 3 Bobby Howfield K	Reserve: 19 Chris Farasopoulos S (IR); -- Bob Parrish DT (IR); Rookies in italics

== Regular season ==
Week	Date	Opponent	Result	Record	Venue	Attendance
1	September 17	at Green Bay Packers	**L** 7–23	0–1	Milwaukee County Stadium	47,124
2	September 23	at **Baltimore Colts**	**W** 34–10	1–1	Memorial Stadium	55,942
3	September 30	at Buffalo Bills	**L** 7–9	1–2	Rich Stadium	77,425
4	October 7	at **Miami Dolphins**	**L** 3–31	1–3	Miami Orange Bowl	63,850
5	October 14	at **New England Patriots**	**W** 9–7	2–3	Schaefer Stadium	58,659
6	October 21	at Pittsburgh Steelers	**L** 14–26	2–4	Three Rivers Stadium	48,682
7	October 28	Denver Broncos	**L** 28–40	2–5	Shea Stadium	55,108
8	November 4	**Miami Dolphins**	**L** 14–24	2–6	Shea Stadium	57,791
9	November 11	**New England Patriots**	**W** 33–13	3–6	Shea Stadium	51,034
10	November 18	at Cincinnati Bengals	**L** 14–20	3–7	Riverfront Stadium	55,745
11	November 25	Atlanta Falcons	**L** 20–28	3–8	Shea Stadium	47,283
12	December 2	**Baltimore Colts**	**W** 20–17	4–8	Shea Stadium	51,167
13	December 9	at Philadelphia Eagles	**L** 23–24	4–9	Veterans Stadium	34,621
14	December 16	**Buffalo Bills**	**L** 14–34	4–10	Shea Stadium	47,740
Note: Intra-division opponents are in **bold** text.

Schedule notes:

- The October 14 game vs. the Patriots was originally scheduled to be played in New York, but due to the New York Mets’ involvement in the World Series, the sites for that game and the November 11 rematch were switched.
- The October 21 game vs. the Steelers was originally scheduled to be played in New York, but was moved to Pittsburgh due to the Mets' ongoing participation in the World Series.

=== Season summary ===
==== Week 2 ====
Team	1	2	3	4	Total
• **Jets**	3	0	10	21	34
Colts	3	7	0	0	10

- Date: September 23
- Location: Memorial Stadium • Baltimore, Maryland
- Game start: 1:00 p.m. EST
- Game attendance: 55,942
- Game weather: 71 °F (21.7 °C)
  Wind 10 miles per hour (16 km/h; 8.7 kn)
- TV announcers (NBC): Charlie Jones, Sam DeLuca

Scoring summary
1	NYJ	Bobby Howfield 22 yard field goal	Jets 3–0
1	BAL	George Hunt 17 yard field goal	Tie 3–3
2	BAL	Glenn Doughty 23 yard pass from Bert Jones (George Hunt kick)	Colts 10–3
3	NYJ	Eddie Bell 12 yard pass from Al Woodall (Bobby Howfield kick)	Tie 10–10
3	NYJ	Bobby Howfield 16 yard field goal	Jets 13–10
4	NYJ	Emerson Boozer 1 yard pass from Al Woodall (Bobby Howfield kick)	Jets 20–10
4	NYJ	Ralph Baker 22 yard interception return (Bobby Howfield kick)	Jets 27–10
4	NYJ	Rich Sowells 30 yard interception return (Bobby Howfield kick)	Jets 34–10

==== Week 5 ====
Team	1	2	3	4	Total
• Jets	3	0	3	3	9
Patriots	0	0	7	0	7

- Date: October 14
- Location: Schaefer Stadium, Foxboro, Massachusetts
- Game start: 1:00 p.m.
- Game weather: 64 °F (17.8 °C), wind 23 miles per hour (37 km/h; 20 kn)
- TV announcers (NBC): Charlie Jones, Sam DeLuca

Scoring summary
1	NYJ	Bobby Howfield 40 yard field goal	Jets 3–0
3	NYJ	Bobby Howfield 39 yard field goal	Jets 6–0
3	NE	Will Foster recovered fumble in end zone (Jeff White kick)	Patriots 7–6
4	NYJ	Bobby Howfield 22 yard field goal	Jets 9–7

==== Week 6 at Steelers ====
New York Jets (2–3) at Pittsburgh Steelers (4–1)

Quarter	1	2	3	4	Total
Jets	7	7	0	0	**14**
Steelers	0	9	3	14	**26**

at Three Rivers Stadium • Pittsburgh, Pennsylvania

- Date: October 21
- Game time: 1:00 p.m. EDT
- Game weather: 50 °F (10 °C) • Wind 9
- Game attendance: 48,682
- Referee: John McDonough
- TV announcers (NBC): Charlie Jones, Al DeRogatis
- Pro-Football-Reference.com

Game information

Jets

- Bill Demory
  6/15, 84 Yds, TD, 3 INT
- John Riggins
  15 Rush, 42 Yds, TD
- Rich Caster
  1 Rec, 28 Yds, TD

Steelers

- Terry Bradshaw
  8/18, 119 Yds, INT
- Franco Harris
  25 Rush, 102 Yds, TD
- Ron Shanklin
  3 Rec, 68 Yds, TD

Scoring summary

Quarter	Time	Drive			Team	Scoring information	Score	
Quarter	Time	Plays	Yards	TOP	Team	Scoring information	NYJ	PIT
1					Jets	Riggins 1-yard touchdown run, Howfield kick good	7	0
2					Steelers	27-yard field goal by Gerela	7	3
2					Steelers	29-yard field goal by Gerela	7	6
2					Jets	Caster 28-yard touchdown reception from Demory, Howfield kick good	14	6
2					Steelers	36-yard field goal by Gerela	14	9
3					Steelers	13-yard field goal by Gerela	14	12
4					Steelers	Shanklin 16-yard touchdown reception from Hanratty, Gerela kick good	14	19
4					Steelers	Harris 2-yard touchdown run, Gerela kick good	14	26
"TOP" = time of possession. For other American football terms, see Glossary of American football.							14	26

=== Standings ===
AFC East
	W	L	T	PCT	DIV	CONF	PF	PA	STK
Miami Dolphins	12	2	0	.857	7–1	9–2	343	150	W1
Buffalo Bills	9	5	0	.643	6–2	7–4	259	230	W4
New England Patriots	5	9	0	.357	1–7	3–8	258	300	L2
New York Jets	4	10	0	.286	4–4	4–7	240	306	L2
Baltimore Colts	4	10	0	.286	2–6	2–9	226	341	W2
