= Emerson Boozer =

American football player (born 1943)

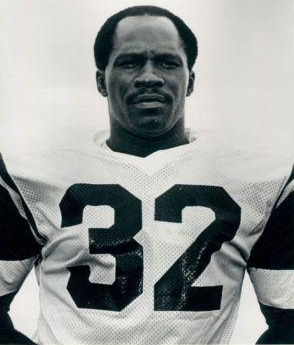
- Boozer in 1974

No. 32
- Position: Running back

Personal information
- Born: July 4, 1943 (age 83); Augusta, Georgia, U.S.
- Listed height: 5 ft 11 in (1.80 m)
- Listed weight: 195 lb (88 kg)

Career information
- High school: Laney (Augusta)
- College: Maryland State
- NFL draft: 1966: 7th round, 98 (By the Pittsburgh Steelers)th overall pick
- AFL draft: 1966: 6th round, 46th overall pick

Career history
- New York Jets (1966–1975)

Awards and highlights
- Super Bowl champion (III); AFL champion (1968); All-AFL (1967); 2× AFL All-Star (1966, 1968); AFL rushing touchdowns leader (1967); New York Jets Ring of Honor; 2× First-team All-American (1964, 1965)

Career NFL statistics
- Rushing yards: 5,135
- Rushing average: 4
- Rushing touchdowns: 52
- Stats at Pro Football Reference
- College Football Hall of Fame

Emerson Boozer (born July 4, 1943) is an American former professional football player who spent his entire career as a running back for the New York Jets in the American Football League (AFL) and National Football League (NFL). In the last year of separate drafts by the AFL and the NFL, Boozer signed with the AFL's Jets, rather than with an NFL team. He was a member of the Jets team that defeated the NFL's champion Baltimore Colts, 16–7, in Super Bowl III. He played 10 seasons for the Jets, and held the team record for total rushing yards and rushing touchdowns at the time he retired. The Jets inducted him into the team's Ring of Honor in 2015.

Boozer played college football at Maryland State College (now the University of Maryland Eastern Shore), where he was an All-American and set school rushing records. He was inducted into the College Football Hall of Fame in 2010, and the University of Maryland Eastern Shore Hall of Fame in 1982.

== Early life ==
Boozer was born in Augusta, Georgia on July 4, 1943. He attended Lucy Craft Laney High School in Augusta, where he was a fullback on the school's football team. In one football season at Laney, he scored 25 touchdowns and had 1,400 rushing yards. In November 1961, Boozer led Lucy Laney over Atlanta's Washington High to win the Georgia Class AA football championship game, 7–0. Boozer had scored 121 points going into the championship game. He rushed for 156 yards in the championship game, and scored the only touchdown on a 21-yard run.

Boozer's high school coach taught him how to "hit-and-spin" as a running back, a technique he took with him to college and professional football. This involved running at full speed toward the line of scrimmage where his blocker was trying to make an opening in the defensive line, and if there was no room to run further because the block was unsuccessful, Boozer would roll off the block and spin out in another direction with his feet still going through the entire process; in an effort to find an opening into which he could run.

During football at Lucy Laney, he once passed out in the heat, and had to be hospitalized and given saline. The treating doctor told Boozer that if they had waited any longer to take Boozer to the hospital he would have died.

Boozer's natural athletic ability came to the attention of football coaches at Laney High School. Despite his proven talent there, football scholarships were not widely offered to the black star. Boozer excelled as well at the college level, where he showed open field ability as a back as well as strength and intensity as a player that exceeded his 5 ft 11 in (1.8 m), 190-pound (86.2 m) size.

== College career ==
Boozer played for Maryland State College (now University of Maryland Eastern Shore) from 1962 to 1965 as a halfback, originally under College Football Hall of Fame head coach Vernon "Skip" McCain, and then coach Roosevelt "Sandy" Gilliam. A two-time All-American, Boozer rushed for a school-record 2,537 yards and 22 touchdowns on 374 carries, an average of 6.8 yards per rushing attempt. He led the team in rushing and scoring each year he played. Over his four-year career, he had individual touchdown running plays of 96, 80, 77, 75, 70 and 51 yards.

As a freshman in 1962, Boozer rushed for a 20-yard touchdown in Maryland State's first game of the season; and Boozer's first college game. The Baltimore Sun named Boozer a first-team halfback on its All-State small college football team in 1962. In reporting its selections, the Sun's sportswriter referred to Boozer as "probably the best running back in the state", on a team that also included future Pro Football Hall of Fame running back Leroy Kelly. Boozer was selected second-team All-Central Intercollegiate Athletic Association (CIAA) conference in 1963, as a sophomore.

Boozer was first team All-CIAA in 1964 and 1965. He also was selected a first-team Pittsburgh Courier All-American in 1964 and 1965. Boozer was hobbled by a leg injury during the first two games of his senior season, but still averaged 6.5 yards per carry in 97 attempts during the season; and rushed for over 100 yards in his last four games that year, including 168 yards against Delaware State in his last game.

Boozer was known as "Rusty" in college. He was college teammates with future Pro Football Hall of Fame player, and the first black head coach in modern NFL history, Art Shell, as well as his future New York Jets' teammate Earl Christy. His quarterback at Maryland State, Charlie "Duke" Stukes, later played for the Baltimore Colts against Boozer in professional football; as did Maryland State teammate Jim Duncan.

Boozer graduated with an industrial arts degree.

== Professional career ==
Boozer was drafted by teams in both the AFL and NFL. He was drafted in the seventh round of the 1966 NFL draft by the Pittsburgh Steelers (98th overall), and was drafted by the New York Jets in the sixth round of the 1966 AFL draft (46th overall). He chose the Jets. In developing their team, the Jets drafted players like Matt Snell, Jerry Philbin, and Ralph Baker in 1964, Joe Namath, George Sauer Jr., and Verlon Biggs in 1965, and Pete Lammons and Boozer in 1966, under director of player personnel and scout George Sauer Sr. and head coach and general manager Wilbur "Weeb" Ewbank. Ewbank had become the Jets' head coach and general manager in early 1963, and hired Sauer that year to help build the team. They also signed future Hall of Fame offensive tackle Winston Hill in 1963 as a free agent. By the 1967 season, these players would be part of a core group that went on to win Super Bowl III the following season.

By 1966, the Jets already had Snell at fullback and figured Boozer to be paired with him at halfback. Going into the 1966 season, Snell and veteran halfback Bill Mathis were the Jets' starting backfield; but it was reported that if Boozer could progress sufficiently then his breakaway speed at halfback could be a complement to Snell at fullback. During the team's four preseason games, Boozer received sufficient playing time to have as many total rushing yards as Mathis and Snell.

Mathis started the first nine games in 1966 at halfback; but he did not have more than seven carries in a game after the third game of the season. When coach Ewbank became disenchanted with his team's offensive failings in passing, he replaced Mathis with Boozer to create more of a rushing attack on offense; and Boozer started the last five games of the 1966 season. Boozer principally was a kick returner through the season's first eight games. In Boozer's first start at halfback, on November 20, 1966, Snell did not play and Boozer had 23 carries for 64 yards, and a rushing touchdown; while also returning a kickoff 96 yards for another touchdown. In the season's final game, Boozer had 23 carries for 117 yards, including a 54-yard run and a touchdown; and Snell had 22 carries for 124 yards and a touchdown.

The Jets finished the 1966 season, 6–6–2. On the year, Boozer had 455 yards rushing, a 4.7 yards per carry average, and five rushing touchdowns. He also had eight receptions for 133 yards, and returned 26 kickoffs for 659 yards (25.3 yards per return). Boozer was fifth in the AFL in kick return yards and seventh in all-purpose yardage. He was selected to play in the AFL All-Star Game at the end of the 1966 season. In 1966, Boozer was named the Pittsburgh Courier AFL Rookie of the Year.

Boozer continued as the starting halfback in 1967. His ability to block with intensity earned him a league-wide reputation. Boozer started the Jets' first 1967 preseason game and scored three touchdowns. He was the starter coming out of their training camp, in a backfield with Snell at fullback and Namath at quarterback.

During the 1967 preseason training camp period, the Jets were nearly driven apart by a racial incident among teammates at a local bar in Peekskill, New York. Owner Sonny Werblin eventually heard about it, and called all the players and coaches together for a meeting. He said the only two players on the team that he absolutely needed were Snell and Namath, and anyone else could pack their bags and leave if something like the bar incident was repeated. After that, there were no more conflicts, and the team began to build a rapport.

In 1967, the Jets improved to 8–5–1. Snell suffered a knee injury in the season's first game, and missed the next eight games. The Jets turned to Boozer as their primary rusher. In the first half of the 1967 season, Boozer displayed talent that drew comparisons to Gale Sayers. He often broke tackles and excelled in the open field. He had 13 touchdowns in only seven games; scoring three touchdowns in a September 24 game against the Denver Broncos and two touchdowns in two other games.

Boozer appeared ready to easily surpass the league touchdown record when he suffered a devastating knee injury in the eighth game of the season, on a tackle by the Kansas City Chiefs' Willie Mitchell and Sherrill Headrick; ending his season and altering his career. Boozer finished that season with 13 touchdowns, 442 yards on 119 carries, and 12 receptions for 205 yards. He also returned 11 kickoffs that season. He had 109 yards receiving in an early October game against the Miami Dolphins; including a 49-yard reception from quarterback Joe Namath for a touchdown. Despite playing in less than eight full games that year, Boozer led the AFL in rushing touchdowns for the season. The Sporting News named him second-team All-AFL. Teammate Pete Lammons believed that prior to Boozer's knee injury, he was superior to every other running back, including Gale Sayers.

Boozer's work ethic further revealed itself over the next two seasons. No longer a breakaway runner, he changed himself into more of an outstanding blocker and goal-line touchdown scorer. In 1968, he started nine games, with 441 yards on 143 carries (3.1 yards per carry) and five rushing touchdowns; with 12 receptions for 101 yards. Ewbank utilized Boozer in pass blocking schemes then new to football. In blocking for both Snell and Joe Namath, Boozer was part of two outstanding teams that narrowly lost just three games in 1968 and went 10–4 in 1969. In 1968, he was selected to play in the AFL All-Star Game for the second time, even with modest rushing statistics. Snell ran for 747 yards in 14 games (4.2 yards per carry) with six touchdowns that season, but was not selected to play in the All-Star Game.

The Jets were 11–3 in 1968, and defeated the Oakland Raiders for the 1968 AFL championship. Boozer had 11 carries for 51 yards, and one reception for 11 yards in that game. The Jets then played the heavily favored Baltimore Colts in Super Bowl III. Boozer and Winston Hill were the blockers during Snell's four-yard touchdown run against the Colts for the first score in the game; and the Jets only touchdown in the game. Boozer's blocking freed Snell often that day for effective running that was key to the landmark upset 16–7 win over the NFL's Colts. Snell rushed for 121 yards and Boozer for 19. Along with Boozer, there were five total Maryland State backs on the two teams' rosters that day: Charlie Stukes and Jim Duncan with the Colts, and former Colt Johnny Sample, Earl Christy, and Boozer on the Jets; Stukes, Duncan, and Christy being Boozer's former college teammates.

The Jets were 10–4 in 1969, again finishing first in the AFL's East Division. Boozer rushed for 604 yards on 130 carries that season, leading the team with a 4.6 yards per carry average; sixth best in the NFL. He also had four rushing touchdowns, and 20 receptions for 221 yards. In 1970, Boozer started 10 games, missing four games after suffering a rib injury; with Snell missing 11 games that season and Namath missing nine games. Boozer led the team in rushing attempts (139) and rushing yards (581), with five rushing touchdowns. He also had 28 receptions for 258 yards. Namath turned to Boozer more as a third-down pass catcher. The Jets fell to third in the AFC East Division with a 4–10 record.

In 1971, rookie John Riggins became the Jets starting fullback, with Boozer starting at halfback. Boozer had a career-high 188 rushing attempts, with 618 rushing yards (second on the Jets to Riggins's 769 yards), and five rushing touchdowns. He also had 11 receptions for 120 yards and another touchdown. Namath only started three games that season, and the Jets were 6–8. In high school, Riggins had watched Boozer play and admired Boozer's ability to stay on his feet even after being hit by defenders. As a teammate, Riggins said it was an honor when Boozer blocked for him. He said Boozer was the best blocking back he had ever seen, and that Boozer had the "knack of exploding" as a blocker.

In 1972, with Joe Namath back from injuries and starting 13 games, the Jets were one of the top offenses in football; being second in the NFL in points scored and total yards; though they finished the season 7–7. Boozer scored three touchdowns in the first game of the season; on a 12-yard pass reception, 15-yard run, and one-yard run; rushing for 50 yards in 13 carries. Boozer pulled a hamstring in the season's second game. He started only 10 games that season, appearing in 11; with less than 10 carries in six of those games. Despite this, he tied for the most combined touchdowns in the NFL with Ron Johnson (who played in every game in 1972), with 14.

Over his 11 games, Boozer still ran for 549 yards on 120 carries, with 11 rushing touchdowns; and had 11 receptions for 142 yards and three receiving touchdowns. On October 15, 1972, he rushed for 150 yards on 18 attempts against the New England Patriots, with touchdown runs of 37, 23, and eight yards in that game. Two weeks later, he scored three rushing touchdowns against the Patriots again of 19, 12 and five yards; rushing for 91 yards in 19 carries. He rushed for 106 yards on 22 carries in the final game of the season, with a three-yard touchdown run. Boozer's ability to block and score near the goal line impressed many as he led the NFL in rushing touchdowns for most of the year before injuries stopped him, with 11 touchdowns in 11 games; ending the season one behind Mercury Morris; who passed Boozer during the 10th week of the season.

In 1973, Boozer was the Jets' primary running back; Riggins starting only nine games that season. Boozer had a career-high 831 yards rushing on 182 carries, with three running touchdowns. He also had 22 receptions for 130 yards, and three receiving touchdowns. In a December 9 game against the Philadelphia Eagles, Boozer rushed for 160 yards on 21 carries. He had a one-yard touchdown run, a 12-yard touchdown reception, and a long run of 52 yards in the game.

In 1974, Boozer started 12 games and had 563 yards on 153 carries, with four rushing touchdowns; and 14 receptions for 161 yards and one receiving touchdown. Boozer scored the first regular-season overtime ("sudden death") touchdown in NFL history on a short pass from Joe Namath to beat the cross-town rival New York Giants; beginning an improbable six-game winning streak for the previously 1–7 Jet squad, coinciding with Namath regaining his top passing form comparable to his early years with the Jets. In his final season, 1975, Boozer started only four games, with 20 carries for 51 yards. He suffered an injured shoulder in the preseason and got off to a slow start; and even when Boozer was able to play, the Jets chose to give playing time to their younger running backs (Riggins and Carl Garrett). It was the only season of Boozer's career without a rushing touchdown.

Boozer announced his retirement in July 1976. At the time Boozer retired, he was the Jets' leader in career rushing yards (5,135). His 52 rushing touchdowns were a team record until 2004, when broken by Curtis Martin. He is still third all-time in Jets' history in total rushing yards, and his 52 rushing touchdowns is second all-time in Jets' history to Martin (through 2025). He has the third most points scored in team history among non-kickers. Boozer also had 139 receptions for 1,488 yards, and 12 receiving touchdowns in his Jets' career.

== Legacy and honors ==
Boozer was inducted into the College Football Hall of Fame in 2010, and the University of Maryland Eastern Shore Hall of Fame in 1982. The Jets inducted him into the team's Ring of Honor in 2015. He was inducted into the Suffolk Sports Hall of Fame on Long Island in the football category with the Class of 1996. Boozer is a member of The Pigskin Club Of Washington, D.C. National Intercollegiate All-American Football Players Honor Roll.

== Media career ==
After announcing his retirement in July 1976, Boozer joined CBS Sports as a television analyst for its coverage of NFL games. In 1976 and 1977, Boozer teamed with play-by-play announcers at CBS who included Bob Costas, Frank Glieber, and Gary Bender. CBS let him go in December 1982.

== NFL career statistics ==
Legend
	Won the Super Bowl
	Led the league
**Bold**	Career high

Year	Team	Games		Rushing						Receiving					Fumbles	
Year	Team	GP	GS	Att	Yds	Avg	Y/G	Lng	TD	Rec	Yds	Avg	Lng	TD	Fum	FR
1966	NYJ	**14**	7	97	455	**4.7**	32.5	**54**	5	8	133	16.6	26	0	0	0
1967	NYJ	8	8	119	442	3.7	55.3	48	10	12	205	**17.1**	**49**	**3**	1	0
1968	NYJ	12	9	143	441	3.1	36.8	33	5	12	101	8.4	23	0	5	**4**
1969	NYJ	**14**	13	130	604	4.6	43.1	50	4	20	222	11.1	29	0	3	1
1970	NYJ	10	10	139	581	4.2	58.1	27	5	**28**	**258**	9.2	33	0	2	1
1971	NYJ	**14**	**14**	**188**	618	3.3	44.1	19	5	11	120	10.9	36	1	**6**	3
1972	NYJ	11	10	120	549	4.6	49.9	37	**11**	11	142	12.9	**49**	**3**	3	0
1973	NYJ	13	12	182	**831**	4.6	**63.9**	52	3	22	130	5.9	15	**3**	**6**	2
1974	NYJ	13	12	153	563	3.7	43.3	20	4	14	161	11.5	29	1	3	3
1975	NYJ	9	4	20	51	2.6	5.7	8	0	1	16	16.0	16	1	0	0
Career		118	99	1,291	5,135	4.0	43.5	54	52	139	1,488	10.7	49	12	29	14

== Personal life ==
After retiring, Boozer moved to Long Island and lives in Huntington Station. He served as Huntington Station's director of parks and recreation for 20 years. He also opened a bar there, Em Boozer’s Pub 32; and served on the town’s Environmental Open Space and Parks Improvement Committee. In 2016, a turf field in Huntington Station was officially renamed after Boozer.

== In popular culture ==
Following retirement he briefly pursued an acting career, appearing in the blaxploitation crime drama Velvet Smooth (1976).

In the 1999 movie Big Daddy, Adam Sandler is wearing Boozer's New York Jets No. 32 jersey at the bar.

== See also ==
- List of American Football League players
