= Harkey =

Harkey is a surname. Notable people with the surname include:

- Alex Harkey (born 2001), American football player
- Bob Harkey (1930–2016), American racing driver
- Cory Harkey (born 1990), American football player
- Diane Harkey (born 1951), American politician
- Ira B. Harkey Jr. (1918–2006), American journalist and writer
- Lem Harkey (1934–2004), American football player
- Mike Harkey (born 1966), American baseball player
- Steve Harkey (born 1949), American football player
- Sarah Harkey (born 1989), American animation artist
