= Charlie Stukes =

American football player (born 1943)

No. 47
- Position: Cornerback

Personal information
- Born: September 13, 1943 (age 83); Chesapeake, Virginia, U.S.
- Listed height: 6 ft 3 in (1.91 m)
- Listed weight: 212 lb (96 kg)

Career information
- High school: Crestwood (Chesapeake)
- College: Maryland Eastern Shore
- NFL draft: 1967: 4th round, 100th overall pick

Career history
- Baltimore Colts (1967–1972); Los Angeles Rams (1973–1974)

Awards and highlights
- Super Bowl champion (V); NFL champion (1968)

Career NFL statistics
- Interceptions: 32
- Interception yards: 443
- Fumble recoveries: 3
- Touchdowns: 1
- Stats at Pro Football Reference

Charlie Stukes (born September 13, 1943) is an American former professional football player who was a defensive back in the National Football League (NFL). He started in Super Bowl V for the Baltimore Colts. Stukes played college football for the Maryland Eastern Shore Hawks and was selected by the Colts in the fourth round of the 1967 NFL/AFL draft. He previously worked as an assistant principal at Oscar Smith High School in Chesapeake, Virginia. In 2016 he was working at the same school as an administrator.

== Early life ==
Stukes was born on September 13, 1943, in Chesapeake, Virginia. He grew up in Bells Mills, and attended Crestwood High School, where he starred in football, basketball and baseball. He was a quarterback on the football team. Stukes was also a high-scoring basketball player on Crestwood's two-time state champion basketball team.

== College career ==
Stukes attended Maryland State College (now the University of Maryland Eastern Shore - UMES), an HBCU school that was part of the Central Intercollegiate Athletic Association (CIAA). He had been recruited by other CIAA schools (Morgan State, North Carolina A&T, and North Carolina Central), but chose Maryland State because young men he had played with in high school had gone there, and that influenced his decision. This included Clarence Clemons (a 2012 inductee into the Hawks Athletics Hall of Fame), who went on to fame as the saxophonist with Bruce Springsteen and the E Street Band.

Stukes starred in both football and baseball, and played basketball as well. He played football and baseball under coach Roosevelt "Sandy" Gilliam. Stukes was quarterback of the Hawks football team. When he graduated in 1967, he had passed for more yards than any quarterback in the school's history, and set a season record for touchdown passes. Stukes also was All-CIAA three years as a defensive back.

He was also a star player on the school's excellent baseball team, which won CIAA titles in 1966 and 1967. As a junior (1966) he ranked fourth in the nation in hitting, and fifth in his senior year (1967). He had 40 runs batted in (RBI) in just 15 games as a junior. As a senior, he averaged 2.73 stolen bases per game (30 steals in 11 games), an NCAA Division II record. He was scouted by Syd Thrift of the Pittsburgh Pirates, but ultimately chose to play professional football after being drafted by the Baltimore Colts.

When Stukes played for the Colts in Super Bowl III against the New York Jets in January 1969, four other Maryland State College players were on the Colts or Jets; the most players from any single school in that Super Bowl. These included three close contemporaries, Jim Duncan (drafted by the Colts in 1968), Emerson Boozer (drafted by the Jets in 1966), and Earl Christy (signed by the Jets in 1966), along with veteran Johnny Sample (playing for the Jets, but originally drafted by the Colts in 1958).

In 1982, Stukes was inducted into the University of Maryland Eastern Shore Hawks Athletics Hall of Fame for football.

== Professional career ==
The Baltimore Colts selected Stukes in the fourth round of the 1967 AFL/NFL draft (100th overall). He was with the Colts from 1967-72, becoming a starter in 1969, at left cornerback. He had 20 interceptions as a Colt. In a 1968 game against the Pittsburgh Steelers, he returned an interception 60 yards for a touchdown. He was the starting left cornerback in the Colts 16–13 victory over the Dallas Cowboys in Super Bowl V, where he had two solo tackles and two combined tackles. In 1971, he was tied for third in the NFL in interceptions, with eight.

In July 1973, the Colts traded Stukes to the Minnesota Vikings for a draft choice, and part of general manager Joe Thomas's efforts to move Colts' veterans to other teams. One month later, the Vikings traded Stukes to the Los Angeles Rams for a draft pick. He played his final two seasons for the Rams.

Stukes started every game both of his years in Los Angeles, now playing right cornerback, with five interceptions in 1973, and seven in 1974. The Rams were in the playoffs both years. In 1974, his final year in the NFL, Stukes was tied for sixth most interceptions in the league, with seven. He suffered an injured knee in a September 1975 pre-season game against the Philadelphia Eagles that ended his NFL career.

== Personal life ==
After retiring, Stukes became a football coach, assistant principal, and administrator at Oscar Smith High in Chesapeake, Virginia.

As of 2022, Stukes son, Dwayne Stukes, has held a number of coaching positions in the NFL, with the Tampa Bay Buccaneers (2006-2011), Chicago Bears (2013-14), New York Giants (2016-17), Jacksonville Jaguars (2019-20), Los Angeles Rams (2021) and Denver Broncos (2022). He was an assistant special teams coach for the 2021 Rams team that won Super Bowl LVI.

In 2016, Stukes was inducted into the Virginia Sports Hall of Fame.
