= Rich Caster =

American football player (1948–2024)

No. 88, 86, 82
- Position: Tight end

Personal information
- Born: October 16, 1948; Mobile, Alabama, U.S.
- Died: February 2, 2024 (aged 75); New York, U.S.
- Listed height: 6 ft 5 in (1.96 m)
- Listed weight: 228 lb (103 kg)

Career information
- High school: Williamson (Mobile)
- College: Jackson State
- NFL draft: 1970: 2nd round, 46th overall pick

Career history
- New York Jets (1970–1977); Houston Oilers (1978–1980); New Orleans Saints (1981); Washington Redskins (1981–1982)

Awards and highlights
- Super Bowl champion (XVII); 3× Pro Bowl (1972, 1974, 1975); NFL records: Career yards per reception by a tight end (minimum 200 career receptions): 17.3

Career NFL statistics
- Receptions: 322
- Receiving yards: 5,515
- Receiving touchdowns: 45
- Stats at Pro Football Reference

Richard C. Caster (October 16, 1948 – February 2, 2024) was an American professional football player who was a tight end for 14 seasons in the National Football League (NFL), primarily with the New York Jets. He also played occasionally as a wide receiver. He played college football for the Jackson State Tigers and was selected by the Jets in the second round of the 1970 NFL draft. Caster is the NFL all-time leader in career receiving yards per reception by a tight end (minimum 200 career receptions) with 17.3.

== NFL career statistics ==
Legend
	Won the Super Bowl
	Led the league
**Bold**	Career high

=== Regular season ===
Year	Team	Games		Receiving				
Year	Team	GP	GS	Rec	Yds	Avg	Lng	TD
1970	NYJ	14	6	19	393	20.7	72	3
1971	NYJ	14	**14**	26	454	17.5	57	6
1972	NYJ	14	13	39	**833**	**21.4**	80	**10**
1973	NYJ	14	**14**	35	593	16.9	49	4
1974	NYJ	13	13	38	745	19.6	89	7
1975	NYJ	14	**14**	**47**	820	17.4	**91**	4
1976	NYJ	14	**14**	31	391	12.6	41	1
1977	NYJ	10	10	10	205	20.5	58	1
1978	HOU	14	6	20	316	15.8	47	5
1979	HOU	**16**	**14**	18	239	13.3	36	1
1980	HOU	**16**	0	27	341	12.6	68	3
1981	NOR	4	0	7	108	15.4	31	0
1981	WAS	3	1	5	77	15.4	26	0
1982	WAS	1	0	0	0	0.0	0	0
		161	119	322	5,515	17.1	91	45

=== Playoffs ===
Year	Team	Games		Receiving				
Year	Team	GP	GS	Rec	Yds	Avg	Lng	TD
1978	HOU	2	2	**8**	**67**	**8.4**	**21**	0
1979	HOU	**3**	**3**	0	0	0.0	0	0
1980	HOU	1	0	0	0	0.0	0	0
1982	WAS	1	0	0	0	0.0	0	0
		8	5	8	67	8.4	21	0

== Personal life ==
His son, Max, is a professional wrestler who performed at All Elite Wrestling from 2020 to 2026. Caster died from complications of Parkinson's disease on February 2, 2024, at the age of 75.
