= Scott Palmer (American football) =

American football player (born 1948)

No. 72, 76
- Position: Defensive tackle

Personal information
- Born: September 15, 1948 (age 78); Cleburne, Texas, U.S.
- Listed height: 6 ft 3 in (1.91 m)
- Listed weight: 245 lb (111 kg)

Career information
- High school: Westbury
- College: Texas
- NFL draft: 1971: 7th round, 162nd overall pick

Career history
- New York Jets (1971); St. Louis Cardinals (1972)

Awards and highlights
- 2× National champion (1969, 1970)

Career NFL statistics
- Games played: 7
- Games started: 0
- Stats at Pro Football Reference

Derrell Scott Palmer (born September 15, 1948) is an American former professional football player who was a defensive tackle for two seasons in the National Football League (NFL). He played college football for the Texas Longhorns.

== Professional career ==
Palmer was selected by the New York Jets in the seventh round of the 1971 NFL draft. He played two games for the Jets in the 1971 season. The next season, Palmer played in five games for the St. Louis Cardinals.
