= Bill Demory =

American football player (1950–2025)

No. 6
- Position: Quarterback

Personal information
- Born: December 1, 1950; Indianola, Iowa, U.S.
- Died: February 14, 2025 (aged 74); Phoenix, Arizona, U.S.
- Listed height: 6 ft 2 in (1.88 m)
- Listed weight: 195 lb (88 kg)

Career information
- High school: Cortez (Phoenix, Arizona)
- College: Arizona
- NFL draft: 1973: undrafted

Career history
- New York Jets (1973–1974)

Career NFL statistics
- Passing attempts: 39
- Passing completions: 12
- Completion percentage: 30.8%
- TD–INT: 2–8
- Passing yards: 159
- Passer rating: 22.2
- Stats at Pro Football Reference

John William Demory Sr. (December 1, 1950 – February 14, 2025) was an American professional football player who was a quarterback for the New York Jets of the National Football League (NFL). He played college football for the Arizona Wildcats. After his football career, he became an economics professor at Central Arizona College.

== Football career ==
Demory attended the University of Arizona and played for the Wildcats before playing for the New York Jets of the NFL, for whom he started three games in weeks 5-7 of the 1973 season. In Demory's three starts, the Jets beat the New England Patriots, though Demory was only 1 for 7 on passing, and nonetheless received praise from coach Weeb Ewbank and the Jets' top quarterback Joe Namath, and lost to the Pittsburgh Steelers and the Denver Broncos.

== Later life and death ==
After football, Demory went to graduate school, receiving an M.B.A. from the University of Iowa and an M.A. in Economics and Entrepreneurship for Educators from the University of Delaware. He was a professor of economics at Central Arizona College.

Demory died from prostate cancer and Parkinson's disease on February 14, 2025, at the age of 74.
