= Chris Farasopoulos =

American football player (born 1949)

Profile
- Position: Defensive back

Personal information
- Born: July 20, 1949 (age 77); Piraeus, Greece

Career information
- College: Brigham Young University
- NFL draft: 1971: 3 / Pick 58th round

Career history
- 1971–1973: New York Jets
- 1974: New Orleans Saints
- Stats at Pro Football Reference

Chris Farasopoulos (born July 20, 1949) is a Greek-American former American football player who played for the Brigham Young Cougars, New York Jets, and the New Orleans Saints in the 1970s.

== Early life ==
Farasopoulos was born in Piraeus, Greece, and is the only son of Vasilios and Theodora Farasopoulos. He graduated from North Torrance High School and earned a BS in human performance from Brigham Young University.

== Career ==
Farasopoulos was selected 79th overall in the fourth round by the Baltimore Orioles in the 1967 Major League Baseball draft. He turned down the Orioles' $5,000 offer after they asked him to change his name "to something like Faras," which he felt "was like offering to take only half of me." He chose instead to accept a full and guaranteed football scholarship from Brigham Young University (BYU) where he was hailed as "the Galloping Greek" by the Arizona Republic. Best known for his agility and speed at BYU, Farasopoulos played defensive back as well as punt and kickoff return. In 1968, he set a Western Athletic Conference record for average yards returned per kickoff at 27.2, a record that stood until Chad Owens's 29.4 average yards per return years later. After selecting John Riggins and John Mooring in the first and second rounds of the 1971 NFL draft, the New York Jets chose Farasopoulos in the third round with the 58th pick overall. During his rookie season, he began a lasting friendship with teammates Riggins and Burgess Owens. He later played for the New Orleans Saints.

Following his football career, Farasopoulos held management positions at VLSI Technology Inc. and National Semiconductor. He then spent 13 years at Integrated Device Technology (IDCT) in various operations management positions, both at the Technology Center and the Static RAM Division in Salinas, California. Most recently, Farasopoulos was responsible for customer operations and business development as vice president with QuickSil of Fremont, California.

== Personal life ==
Farasopoulos is married and lives in California with his family, including his three daughters, two of whom are twins.

== See also ==
- List of NCAA major college yearly punt and kickoff return leaders
