= Gary Arthur =

American football player (born 1948)

No. 82
- Position: Tight end

Personal information
- Born: January 9, 1948 (age 78); Dayton, Ohio, U.S.
- Listed height: 6 ft 5 in (1.96 m)
- Listed weight: 250 lb (113 kg)

Career information
- High school: Chaminade Julienne (Dayton)
- College: Miami (OH)
- NFL draft: 1970: 5th round, 124th overall pick

Career history
- New York Jets (1970–1971)
- Stats at Pro Football Reference

Gary Arthur (born January 9, 1948) is an American former professional football player who was a tight end for the New York Jets of the National Football League (NFL) from 1970 to 1971. He played college football for the Miami RedHawks.
