= Al Woodall =

American football player (born 1945)

No. 18
- Position: Quarterback

Personal information
- Born: December 7, 1945 (age 80); Erwin, North Carolina, U.S.
- Listed height: 6 ft 5 in (1.96 m)
- Listed weight: 205 lb (93 kg)

Career information
- High school: Erwin
- College: Duke
- NFL draft: 1969: 2nd round, 52nd overall pick

Career history
- New York Jets (1969–1975)

Career NFL/AFL statistics
- Passing attempts: 503
- Passing completions: 246
- Completion percentage: 48.9%
- TD–INT: 18–23
- Passing yards: 2,970
- Passer rating: 60.3
- Stats at Pro Football Reference

Frank Alley Woodall (born December 7, 1945) is an American former professional football player who was a quarterback for the New York Jets in the American Football League (AFL) and National Football League (NFL). He played college football for the Duke Blue Devils, earning All-American honors. He played several seasons with the Jets in the AFL and NFL. He started several games in 1970, 1971, and 1973, subbing for an injured Joe Namath. Woodall retired after spending the 1975 season on injured reserve with torn knee ligaments.

== College career ==
Al Woodall was recruited by Duke University out of Erwin High School in Erwin, North Carolina. In 1966, he took over as starting quarterback for the Duke Blue Devils, replacing Todd Orvald, who had struggled. That season, Woodall completed 39 passes, which was the ninth most in the ACC. The next season, with Orvald graduated and Woodall the most experienced signal caller on the roster, he was penciled in as the starter. However, the football team, under head coach Tom Harp, struggled to a 4–6 record. Woodall, however, had a strong season stats wise. His 79 pass completions was good enough for second in the ACC, finishing behind Clemson's Jimmy Addison, who had 82. Woodall finished sixth in pass attempts with 150, but led the conference in pass completion percentage with 52.7, passing yards per attempt with 6.8 yards per attempt, and passing yards with 1,019.

== Pro career ==
In the 1969 draft, the Jets selected Woodall in the second round to provide insurance for starter Joe Namath. While Namath had led the Jets to a victory in Super Bowl III the season prior, there was concern over his chronic knee issues. As a rookie in 1969, Woodall appeared in only four games. He performed mop up duty in the Jets 34–16 loss to the Kansas City Chiefs and in their 40–7 blowout of the Cincinnati Bengals the following week. When the 1969 season ended, Woodall had completed 4 passes on 9 attempts, with two interceptions thrown against zero touchdown passes.

With the 1970 season looming, the Jets had concern at the quarterback position. Namath had invested in a nightclub called Bachelors III. While the club attracted movie stars, well-known pro athletes, it also attracted elements of the underground gambling scene. when Namath was directed by the league to divest himself from the nightclub because of the gambling element, Namath balked and threatened to retire from pro football. With Namath's status in question, Woodall began to take first-team reps, thinking he might be the starter going into the 1970 season. Namath back-pedaled from his retirement threats and sold his interest in the nightclub.

However, knee issues that Jets management had been concerned about became reality. Due to injury, Woodall drew the first start of his pro career, a 10–6 loss to the hapless Buffalo Bills. The Woodall-led Jets failed to reach the end zone, and instead, had to settle for two Jim Turner field goals. The Jets would lose the next two games, and finally broke their losing streak when they upset the George Allen led Los Angeles Rams 31–20. In that game Woodall went 10 for 17 with three touchdown passes, including an 11-yard pass to George Sauer that put the game out of reach. The next week the Jets faced the 1-9 Boston Patriots, led by quarterback Joe Kapp, who just two seasons prior had led the Minnesota Vikings to the Super Bowl. Woodall and the offense struggled, and Woodall was sacked twice, but the Jets managed to come away with a 17–3 victory. The following week the 4-7 Jets beat the 9-2 Vikings 20–10, but then lost to the Oakland Raiders, Miami Dolphins and Baltimore Colts to finish the season 4–10.

In 1971, Woodall was called upon to start five games, going 1-4 during that time, with the lone victory coming at the expense of the Dolphins. He did not appear in a game during the 1972 season, but would start six games during the 1973 season, going 1–5. He had been called in to relieve an ineffective Namath in the season opener against the Green Bay Packers, led by quarterback Scott Hunter. The Packers had been shutting out the Jets until Woodall came off the bench to lead a scoring drive the ended with a touchdown strike to David Knight. In 1974, under new Jets head coach Charley Winner, the Jets finished 7–7 with Woodall again just appearing in relief of Namath. Woodall's own status for the 1971 season was cause for concern he was injured in a 21-16 preseason loss to Kansas City.

By the time his career was over, Woodall had a 5–14 record as a starter in the NFL, while throwing 18 touchdowns and 23 interceptions.

During his time with the Jets, Woodall was a roommate of future hall of fame running back John Riggins. Woodall recounted that he learned more during his rookie training camp from Namath than he did the veteran Babe Parilli, who had been Namath's back-up during the Super Bowl run.

Woodall is an advocate for the NFLPA, teaching younger players to spend their money wisely and have a nest egg for once their careers are over.

Woodall was part of an infamous joke by Jets head coach Rex Ryan. Tired of facing questions about which one of his struggling quarterbacks, Mark Sanchez or Tim Tebow, were going to start, Ryan remarked that it was Al Woodall's week. Woodall, playing along with the joke, said he was ready to go when the Jets needed him.

Woodall was among the players who filed a class action lawsuit against the NFL over how the league had treated their head injuries, though he admitted that the mentality of the day, of showing how tough you were by playing through injuries, was a factor as well. Woodall said if given the chance, he'd do it all again, and has no regrets about playing in the NFL.
