= Sandy Gilliam =

American football and baseball coach (1932–2014)

Biographical details
- Born: 1932
- Died: May 16, 2014 (aged 81); Lancaster, South Carolina, U.S.

Playing career

Football
- ?: Allen
- Position: Quarterback

Coaching career (HC unless noted)

Football
- 1954–1963: Lancaster HS (SC)
- 1964–1968: Maryland State

Baseball
- 1965–1969: Maryland State

Administrative career (AD unless noted)
- ?–1969: Maryland State
- 1969–1973: Denver Broncos (scout)

Head coaching record
- Overall: 24–11–2 (college football); 87–17 (high school football)

Roosevelt "Sandy" Gilliam Jr. (1932 – May 16, 2014) was an American football and baseball coach. He served as the head football coach at Maryland State College—now known as the University of Maryland Eastern Shore—from 1964 to 1968. A Union, South Carolina native, Gilliam was a scout for the Denver Broncos of the American Football League (AFL) and National Football League (NFL) from 1969 to 1973.

== Head coaching record ==
=== College football ===
Year	Team	Overall	Conference	Standing	Bowl/playoffs
Maryland State Hawks (Central Intercollegiate Athletic Association) (1964–1968)
1964	Maryland State	4–2–1	4–1–1	5th	
1965	Maryland State	5–2	5–1	T–2nd	
1966	Maryland State	5–3	3–3	T–7th	
1967	Maryland State	5–2	5–1	2nd	
1968	Maryland State	5–2–1	3–2–1	5th	
Maryland State:		24–11–2	20–8–2		
Total:		24–11–2			
