= Rocky Turner =

American football player (born 1950)

No. 29
- Positions: Defensive back, wide receiver

Personal information
- Born: August 6, 1950 (age 76); Augusta, Georgia, U.S.
- Listed height: 6 ft 0 in (1.83 m)
- Listed weight: 190 lb (86 kg)

Career information
- High school: Augusta
- College: Chattanooga
- NFL draft: 1972: 10th round, 244th overall pick

Career history
- New York Jets (1972–1973)

Career NFL statistics
- Games played: 22
- Stats at Pro Football Reference

Harley "Rocky" Turner (born August 6, 1950) is an American former professional football player who was a defensive back and wide receiver for the New York Jets of the National Football League (NFL) from 1972 to 1974. He played college football for the Chattanooga Mocs and was selected by the Jets in the tenth round by the 1972 NFL draft. Turner was named on the Chattanooga Football All-Century Football Team in 2003 and became a pediatric dentist.
