= Mark Lomas =

American football player (1948–2025)

No. 84
- Positions: Defensive end, defensive tackle

Personal information
- Born: June 8, 1948; Los Angeles, California, U.S.
- Died: June 4, 2025 (aged 76)
- Listed height: 6 ft 4 in (1.93 m)
- Listed weight: 250 lb (113 kg)

Career information
- High school: Garden Grove (Garden Grove, California)
- College: Northern Arizona
- NFL draft: 1970: 8th round, 202nd overall pick

Career history
- New York Jets (1970–1976)

Career NFL statistics
- Games played: 67
- Games started: 61
- Fumble recoveries: 4
- Sacks: 31
- Stats at Pro Football Reference

Mark Arnold Lomas (June 8, 1948 – June 4, 2025) was an American professional football player who was a defensive lineman for five seasons with the New York Jets of the National Football League (NFL). He played college football for the Northern Arizona Lumberjacks.

== College career ==
Lomas played high school football at Garden Grove High School and then started college at Golden West Junior College before transferring to Northern Arizona University where he played two seasons for the Lumberjacks. He was an honorable mention small college All-American.

== Professional career ==
The Jets selected Lomas in the eighth round of the 1970 NFL Draft. As a rookie, Lomas started all 14 games for the Jets, beginning the season at left end and then shifting inside to tackle for the final 10 games of the season. Lomas' first game with the Jets, a 31-21 loss to the Cleveland Browns, happened to be the first ever Monday Night Football broadcast.

Lomas again started all 14 games in 1971, this time at right end, and shared the team's Heede Award (along with John Little) as the Jets most improved and dedicated defensive player. Lomas was again the starting right end in 1973 and was credited with sacking legendary Baltimore Colts quarterback Johnny Unitas three times in the Jets' Week 2 victory and then recovering a key fumble to set up a touchdown when the rivals met again in Week 12.

In 1974, Lomas for the first time in his professional career did not play in every Jets game after suffering an Achilles tendon injury in a Week 11 victory over the Miami Dolphins. Even playing an abbreviated season, he was credited with leading the team in sacks for the third-straight season. That Dolphins game would prove to be his last regular season action in the NFL, as Lomas missed the entire 1975 season rehabbing after aggravating the injury playing tennis in the offseason. Lomas attempted a comeback in 1976, but he broke his leg in the Jets' first preseason game, ending his NFL career.

== Personal life and death ==
During his playing career, Lomas worked as a substitute teacher in the offseason. Following his retirement, Lomas sold mobile cranes in Southern California, eventually opening his own business, CranesBoomAndJib.com.

Lomas was inducted in the Northern Arizona University Athletics Hall of Fame in 1981.

Lomas died on June 4, 2025, at the age of 76.
