= Roy Kirksey =

American football player and coach (1947–1981)

No. 63, 66, 65
- Positions: Guard, linebacker

Personal information
- Born: September 18, 1947; Greenville, South Carolina, U.S.
- Died: September 5, 1981 (aged 33); Taylors, South Carolina, U.S.
- Listed height: 6 ft 1 in (1.85 m)
- Listed weight: 235 lb (107 kg)

Career information
- High school: Washington (Greenville)
- College: Maryland Eastern Shore
- NFL draft: 1971: 8th round, 188th overall pick

Career history
- New York Jets (1971–1972); Philadelphia Eagles (1973–1974)
- Stats at Pro Football Reference

Roy Kirksey (September 18, 1947 – September 5, 1981) was an American football guard. He played for the New York Jets from 1971 to 1972 and for the Philadelphia Eagles from 1973 to 1974. He died on September 5, 1981, after his car went out of control and overturned in Greenville County, South Carolina.
