= Weeb Ewbank =

American football coach (1907–1998)

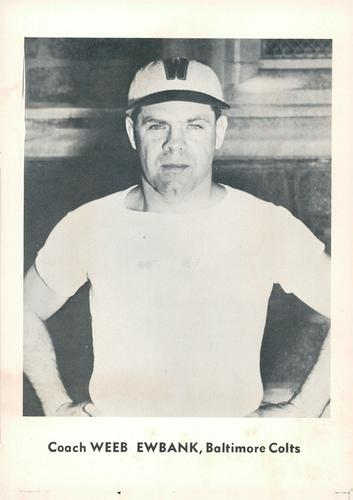

Personal information
- Born: May 6, 1907; Richmond, Indiana, U.S.
- Died: November 17, 1998 (aged 91); Oxford, Ohio, U.S.

Career information
- High school: Richmond
- College: Miami (OH)

Career history
- Van Wert HS (OH) (1928–1929); McGuffey HS (OH) (1930–1943); Great Lakes Navy (1943–1945) (assistant); Brown (1946) (assistant); Washington University (1947–1948); Cleveland Browns (1949–1953) (assistant); Baltimore Colts (1954–1962); New York Jets (1963–1973); Columbia (1975) (assistant)

Awards and highlights
- Super Bowl champion (III); 2× NFL champion (1958, 1959); AFL champion (1968); NFL Coach of the Year (1958); New York Jets Ring of Honor; New York Jets Jacket retired; Indiana Football Hall of Fame; Miami University Hall of Fame; Washington University in St. Louis Hall of Fame

Career statistics
- Regular season: 130–129–7 (.502)
- Postseason: 4–1 (.800)
- Career: NFL: 134–130–7 (.507); NCAA: 14–4 (.778)
- Coaching profile at Pro Football Reference
- Executive profile at Pro Football Reference
- Pro Football Hall of Fame

Wilbur Charles "Weeb" Ewbank (/ˈjuːbæŋk/ YOO-bank; May 6, 1907 – November 17, 1998) was an American professional football coach. He led the Baltimore Colts to consecutive NFL championships in 1958 and 1959 and the New York Jets to victory in Super Bowl III in January 1969. He is the only coach to win a championship in both the National Football League (NFL) and American Football League (AFL).

Raised in Indiana, Ewbank attended Miami University in Ohio, where he was a multi-sport star who led his baseball, basketball, and football teams to state championships. He immediately began a coaching career after graduating, working at Ohio high schools between 1928 and 1943, when he entered the U.S. Navy during World War II. While in the military, Ewbank was an assistant to Paul Brown on a service football team at Naval Station Great Lakes outside of Chicago. Ewbank was discharged in 1945 and coached college sports for three years before reuniting with Brown as an assistant with the Cleveland Browns, a professional team in the All-America Football Conference (AAFC). The Browns won all four AAFC championships. They joined the NFL with the league's merger in 1950, winning the championship that year.

Ewbank left the Browns after the 1953 season to become head coach of the Colts, a young NFL team that had struggled in its first season. In 1956, Ewbank brought in quarterback Johnny Unitas, who quickly became a star and helped lead a potent offense that included wide receiver Raymond Berry and fullback Alan Ameche to an NFL championship in 1958. The Colts repeated as champions in 1959, but the team's performance slipped over the next three seasons and Ewbank was fired three weeks after their final game of the 1962 season. He was soon picked up by the Jets, a team in the still new AFL. While his first few years were unsuccessful, Ewbank helped build the Jets into a contender after signing Alabama quarterback Joe Namath in 1965. The Jets won the AFL championship in 1968, and then went on to win Super Bowl III in one of the biggest upsets in NFL history.

Ewbank, who was known as a mild-mannered coach who favored simple but well-executed strategies, retired after the 1973 season and settled in Oxford, Ohio. He was inducted into the Pro Football Hall of Fame in 1978, and died twenty years later in Oxford on November 17, 1998, the 30th anniversary of the "Heidi Game".

== Early life and college ==
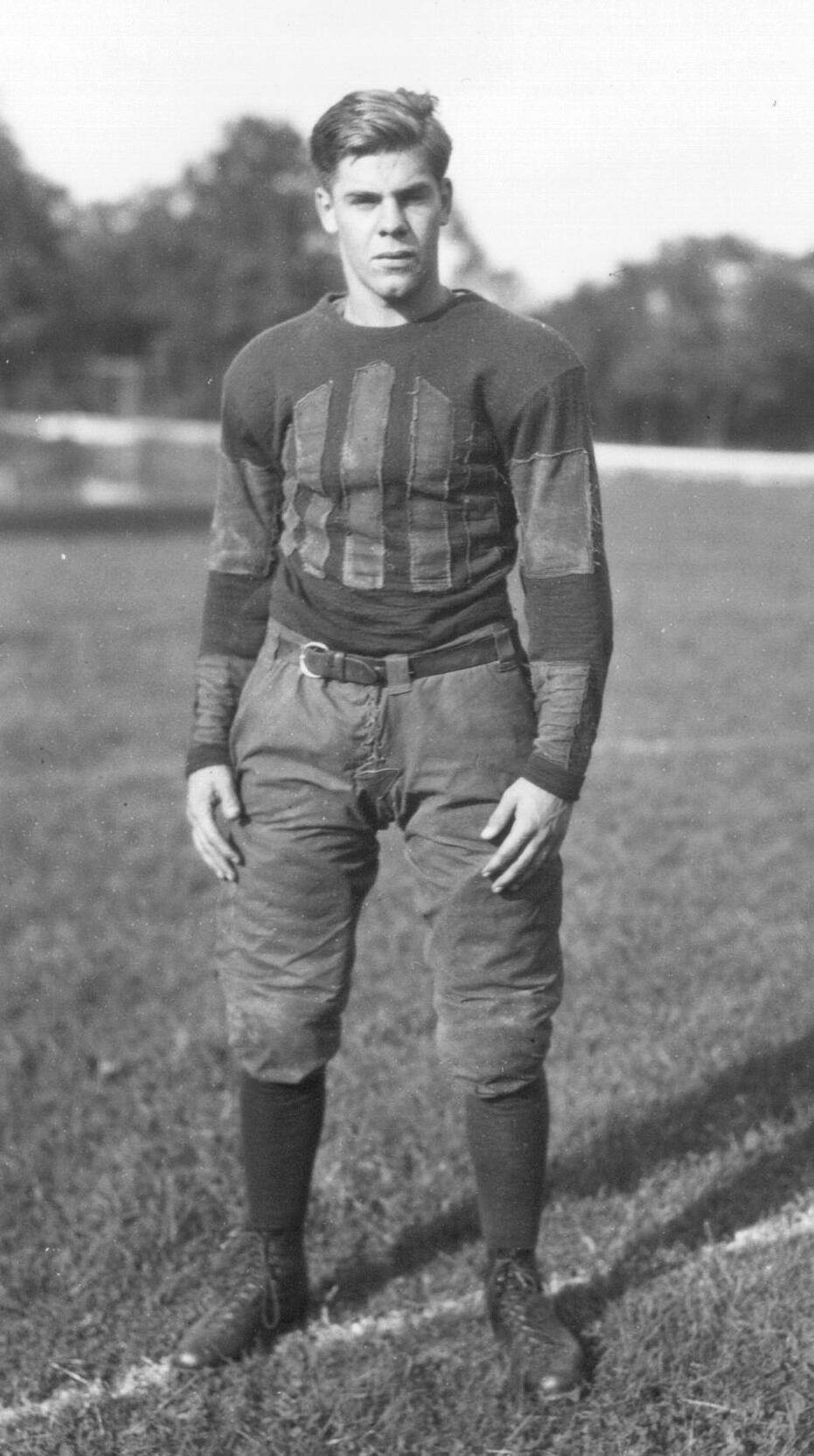
Ewbank in 1926

Born in Richmond, Indiana, Ewbank's father was a grocer who owned two stores in the small city. He attended Morton High School and played quarterback on the football team, was an outfielder in baseball, and was a member of the basketball team. He captained the football and basketball teams when he was a senior. As a teenager, Ewbank and his father drove to Dayton, Ohio, to see early football star Jim Thorpe and the Canton Bulldogs play. One of his younger brothers could not pronounce "Wilbur" correctly and called him "Weeb", the nickname he was known by for the rest of his life.

After graduating from high school in 1924, Ewbank attended Miami University in Oxford, Ohio. He played on the school's football team as a quarterback under head coach Chester Pittser. He was also the center fielder on the baseball team and a forward on the basketball team. While Ewbank was small in stature – he was only 5 feet 7 inches (1.70 m) and weighed 146 pounds (66 kg) – he was one of Miami's best athletes. He shared quarterback duties with Eddie Wohlwender on a squad that finished with an 8–1 win–loss record and won the Ohio Athletic Conference championship in 1927, his senior year. Miami's baseball team also won the Ohio Conference when he was a sophomore and took the Buckeye Athletic Association title when he was a senior. The basketball team won a state title when he was a junior. Ewbank was a member of Phi Delta Theta fraternity while at Miami.

== Coaching career ==
Shortly after graduating from Miami in 1928, Ewbank took his first coaching job at Van Wert High School in Van Wert, Ohio, overseeing the football, basketball, and baseball teams. He remained there until 1930, when he moved back to Oxford and took a position coaching football and basketball at McGuffey High School, a private institution run by Miami University. He also taught physical education at Miami. Ewbank took a break from coaching in 1932 to pursue a master's degree at Columbia University in New York City and filled in as Miami's basketball coach in 1939 after the previous coach left for another job, but otherwise held his coaching positions at McGuffey until 1943. Under his tutelage, the school's Green Devils football team had a win–loss record of 71–21 (.772) in thirteen seasons. This included a streak of three undefeated seasons between 1936 and 1939 and one season – 1936 – where the team did not allow any scoring by opponents.

Ewbank joined the U.S. Navy in 1943 as American involvement in World War II intensified. He was assigned for training to Naval Station Great Lakes north of Chicago, where Paul Brown, a former classmate who succeeded him as Miami's starting quarterback, was coaching the base football team. Brown had become a successful high school coach in Ohio before being named head football coach at Ohio State University in 1941. At Great Lakes, Ewbank was an assistant to Brown on the football team and coached the basketball team.

Following his discharge from the Navy at the end of the war in 1945, Ewbank became the backfield coach under Charles "Rip" Engle at Brown University. He also was head coach of the basketball team in the 1946–47 season, his only one at Brown.

Ewbank's next stop was as head football coach at Washington University in St. Louis for the 1947 and 1948 seasons. Ewbank guided the Bears to a 14–4 record in two seasons, (5–3 in 1947, 9–1 in 1948).

=== Cleveland Browns ===
Despite his success in St. Louis, Ewbank quit his job when he was given the chance to serve as an assistant under Paul Brown, who by 1949 was coaching the Cleveland Browns, a professional team in the All-America Football Conference (AAFC). Ewbank was brought in to oversee the Browns' linemen after backfield coach John Brickels quit to take a job at Miami University and tackles coach Bill Edwards left to become the head coach at Vanderbilt University. Ewbank expected to coach quarterbacks, having played the position in college, but Brown insisted that he oversee the tackles. "He knew I'd have to work very hard at this job and bring a fresh approach", Ewbank said many years later.

Led by quarterback Otto Graham, fullback Marion Motley, and ends Dante Lavelli and Mac Speedie, the Browns won the AAFC championship in 1949, their fourth straight title. The AAFC folded after the season, and the Browns were absorbed by the more established National Football League (NFL). The team finished the 1950 season with a 10–2 record and won the NFL championship by beating the Los Angeles Rams. The Browns reached the NFL championship each year between 1951 and 1953, but lost once to the Rams and twice to the Detroit Lions.

=== Baltimore Colts ===
Ewbank got his first professional head coaching job in early 1954 for the NFL's Baltimore Colts, a franchise that had started play the previous year. While it was a step up for Ewbank, Brown encouraged him not to take the job and told him he would not be successful. After Ewbank took the job, Brown accused him of passing information about the Browns' draft targets to the Colts. Brown had insisted that he stay with the Browns through the 1954 draft, and NFL commissioner Bert Bell agreed. During the draft, Ewbank allegedly sent the names of players Brown liked to the Colts through Baltimore sportswriter John Steadman, including end Raymond Berry, who went on to have a long and successful career.

The Colts struggled in Ewbank's first years as head coach, posting records of 3–9 in 1954 and 5–6–1 in 1955. In 1956, however, the team signed quarterback Johnny Unitas after he was cut by the Pittsburgh Steelers. Ewbank brought in Otto Graham to tutor Unitas, who complemented an improving team that included Berry, fullback Alan Ameche, halfback Lenny Moore and defensive back Don Shula.

The Colts began the 1956 season with a 3–3 record, and calls for Ewbank's firing intensified – just as they had the previous year. Team owner Carroll Rosenbloom supported him, however, saying that while he had considered a coaching change in the past, Ewbank could stay with the Colts "forever – or until he fouls up". When he came to Baltimore, Ewbank had promised to create a system like Paul Brown's in Cleveland, but said he would need time to turn the team into a winner. The Colts finished 1956 with a 5–7 record.

The team made a turnaround the following year, posting a 7–5 record, but still finished third in the NFL's Western Division behind the San Francisco 49ers and Detroit Lions. The team improved further in 1958, winning the Western Division with a 9–3 record and earning a spot in the NFL championship game against the New York Giants. Led by Unitas, Berry and Ameche, the team won the game 23–17 in sudden-death overtime. Often referred to as "The Greatest Game Ever Played", the championship was watched by a large national audience on television and helped make professional football one of the most viewed sports in the U.S. Ewbank was named coach of the year by the Associated Press and United Press International after the season.

Baltimore finished with a 9–3 record for the second year in a row in 1959 and repeated as NFL champions. The team's performance fell off in subsequent years, however, and after posting a 7–7 record in 1962, Rosenbloom fired Ewbank three weeks later. He was succeeded by former player Don Shula, a 33-year-old assistant coach with the Lions.

His legacy as a coach is mixed. Some remember Ewbank as a humble coach who had a good sense of humor and tried to stay out of the spotlight. He could also be harsh with his players, however. Before the 1958 championship game, he gave a speech telling his stars they needed to improve and had barely made the team. Unitas, he said, was obtained "with a seventy-five-cent phone call" and Ameche wasn't liked or wanted. Ewbank was not universally liked by his players. Second-string running back Jack Call later said the team won "in spite of, not because of" Ewbank. Other players saw him as overly easygoing, saying that while he was able to build teams up, he became too relaxed once he reached the top. Hall of Famer Raymond Berry stated in his book All the Moves I Had, "What it amounts to is that Ewbank knew exactly what he wanted his team to do and how to get them to do it well... Being under Weeb's system was the number one reason why Unitas and I had the careers we had."

In his autobiography, which he partially dedicated to Weeb Ewbank, Hall of Famer Art Donovan had this to say about his former coach: "When Weeb and Joe Thomas came in and introduced the keying defense—one that depended upon quickness and a players's ability to read offenses—man, I was in hog heaven. Weeb Ewbank made Arthur J. Donovan, Jr., a Hall of Fame football player. I loved him for that; I always will love him for that. I can honestly say that Weeb Ewbank became and remains one of the most important, cherished people in my life. With that out of the way, I can also honestly say that Weeb was a screwball who held insane grudges, concentrated too much on what I considered the unimportant aspects of the game, thought he was smarter than God, and deep down inside was one mean sonofabitch."

Ewbank left as the longest tenured head coach in the history of the Colts (112), with Ted Marchibroda passing him three decades later.

=== New York Jets ===
A five-man syndicate led by Sonny Werblin bought the New York Titans franchise of the American Football League (AFL), an NFL competitor, as part of bankruptcy proceedings in 1963. Shortly thereafter, the team changed its name to the New York Jets and hired Ewbank in April as its head coach and general manager. Ewbank took over a team that had not had a winning record in its first three years of existence and hired a coaching staff that included Chuck Knox, Walt Michaels, and Clive Rush, all future head coaches. When he was hired, Ewbank said he had a five-year plan to succeed in Baltimore, and "I don't see why we can't build a winner here in five years."

While the Jets won their first three games with Ewbank as coach, his first several years were unsuccessful. The team, meanwhile, had to deal with numerous logistical issues stemming from its second-tier status among New York's sports teams. The Jets switched stadiums from the Polo Grounds in Manhattan after the 1963 season to the new Shea Stadium in Queens, but shared it with baseball's New York Mets. Concerned about possible damage to the stadium's natural turf, the Mets would not allow the Jets to practice at Shea, forcing the team to hold practices at the Rikers Island jail complex. The Jets posted 5–8–1 records for three consecutive seasons (1963–1965).

Despite limited on-field success in Ewbank's first years, the Jets began to put the pieces of a winning team in place. In 1964, they outbid cross-town NFL rival New York Giants for Matt Snell, a top running back prospect out of Ohio State. Linebacker Larry Grantham became a consistent All-Pro selection and safety Dainard Paulson had 12 interceptions in 1964, which remains a team record. An even bigger coup came in 1965, when the Jets signed Joe Namath, a star quarterback at Alabama under coach Bear Bryant. The St. Louis Cardinals selected Namath as the twelfth overall pick of the NFL draft, but Namath later said he chose the Jets in part because he got along with Ewbank and was impressed by how he had developed Unitas while with the Colts.

Namath quickly became a star for the Jets. The team improved to 6–6–2 in 1966 and 8–5–1 in 1967, when Namath became the first to throw for more than 4,000 yards in a single season. By 1968, Ewbank's team was becoming one of the top teams in the AFL. All of its main starters returned from the year before, and the Jets brought in All-Pro guard Bob Talamini from the Houston Oilers. The Jets started with a 3–2 record, but won eight of nine to finish the regular season 11–3 and win the AFL East Division by four games. One of the Jets' losses in 1968 was on the road in mid-November against the Oakland Raiders that later came to be known as the Heidi Game. After Jim Turner kicked a field goal for the Jets that gave them a 32–29 lead with just over a minute left to play, NBC cut away from the game to a scheduled broadcast of the children's movie Heidi. The Raiders went on to win the game by scoring two touchdowns in the final 42 seconds. Ewbank's wife Lucy called the locker room to congratulate him on the win, only to learn the team had lost.

The Jets' first-place finish in their division in 1968 set up a rematch with the Raiders – the defending AFL champions and winners of the AFL West – for the league championship. Namath threw three touchdowns as the Jets won 27–23, putting them through to the third World Championship game, a matchup between the winner of the AFL and NFL now known as Super Bowl III. The Jets were 19-point underdogs to the Colts, who had continued to succeed after Ewbank's departure with Don Shula as head coach and the services of Unitas as quarterback, although the 1968 season saw Earl Morrall play as the starter due to a sore elbow suffered by Unitas, and Morrall won the league MVP that year. Nevertheless, Namath publicly guaranteed a Jets win before the game, which rankled Ewbank. Ewbank liked that the Colts were favored, thinking it would make them complacent, and did not want to agitate them by boasting about the Jets' chances.

Ewbank and the Jets played an unconventional game against the Colts, opting for an uncharacteristically conservative strategy in part because star wideout Don Maynard was nursing a hamstring injury. Also on film, the Jets noticed the Colts while talented on defense, were very predictable. They did not shift out of a defense once it was called from the sideline. So Namath called most of the plays at the line of scrimmage after viewing the Colts' defense instead of calling the offensive plays in the huddle. The tactic worked against the Colts, and the Jets built a 16–0 lead going into the game's fourth quarter by relying on Snell's running and Namath's ability to complete short passes against a steady Colts' blitz. Snell had 121 yards on 30 carries. The Jets' defense, meanwhile, held back a Colts offense that scored 460 points throughout the team's 15–1 regular- and post-season record up to that point. New York intercepted four Baltimore passes, three thrown by Earl Morrall and one by Unitas, who entered the game in the second half. The Jets won the game 16–7, aided by Ewbank's familiarity with many of the Colts' players and strategies.

The Jets had a 10–4 record in 1969, but lost a divisional playoff to the Kansas City Chiefs. Ewbank was named the AFL's coach of the year after the season, but the team did not post a winning record in any of the following four years. In December 1972, Ewbank announced that he would retire as head coach after the 1973 season, saying he wanted to spend more time with his wife. He continued as general manager, however, and was named the team vice president. Charley Winner, the former coach of the St. Louis Cardinals and the husband of Ewbank's daughter Nancy, was appointed as his replacement in early 1973. The 1973 Jets season is the subject of the book The Last Season of Weeb Ewbank by Paul Zimmerman. After the team lost seven of its first eight games in 1974, Ewbank resigned as vice president and general manager. He agreed to coach quarterbacks at Columbia University in 1975.

== Later life and honors ==
Ewbank moved back to Oxford in retirement and wrote a book in 1977 called Football Greats. He was inducted into the Pro Football Hall of Fame in 1978, but said later that year that he was glad to be out of coaching. With the expansion of the NFL, he said, talent had become diluted and fielding a good team was difficult. Coaches, meanwhile, customarily took the blame for a team's failures, and the sport had become too violent.

Ewbank's coaching style was laid-back but efficient, combining his mild personality with an orderliness inherited from Paul Brown. "Weeb combined a low-key style with a flair for the most dramatic of accomplishments", former NFL commissioner Paul Tagliabue said in 1998. "He led two of the legendary teams during the era of pro football's greatest growth. But he preferred to stay in the background and let the players take the credit." He favored well-practiced execution of a limited number of plays over complicated offensive and defensive systems. Paul Brown "had the exact same approach: Don't do too much, but what you do, execute it flawlessly", Raymond Berry said in 2013, adding that the Colts' 1958 championship team had only six passing plays.

Ewbank is the only man to coach two professional football teams to championships, and the only man to win the NFL championship, the AFL championship and a Super Bowl. His regular-season career record in the NFL and AFL was 130–129–7, and his playoff record was 4–1. Ewbank was selected as the head coach on the AFL All-Time Team in 1970. In addition to the Pro Football Hall of Fame, he was inducted into the Miami University Athletic Hall of Fame in 1969, the Indiana Football Hall of Fame in 1974 and the Talawanda School District Athletic Hall of Fame in 1999. He also won the Walter Camp Distinguished American Award in 1987 and was inducted into the Jets' Ring of Honor in 2010.

Ewbank suffered a dislocated hip in the aftermath of the Jets' 1968 AFL championship game win, and had other health issues in his later years. He broke his leg and had two hip replacements in the 1990s. He also had myasthenia in his right eye. Ewbank died at 91 on November 17, 1998, the 30th anniversary of the "Heidi Game", after suffering from heart problems. He and his wife Lucy had three daughters, Luanne, Nancy and Jan. His daughter Nancy married Charley Winner.

== Head coaching record ==
=== College football ===
Year	Team	Overall	Conference	Standing	Bowl/playoffs
Washington University Bears (Independent) (1947–1948)
1947	Washington University	5–3			
1948	Washington University	9–1			
Washington University:		14–4			
Total:		14–4			

=== AFL/NFL ===
Team	Year	Regular season					Postseason			
Team	Year	Won	Lost	Ties	Win %	Finish	Won	Lost	Win %	Result
BAL	1954	3	9	0	.250	6th NFL Western	–	–	–	–
BAL	1955	5	6	1	.455	4th NFL Western	–	–	–	–
BAL	1956	5	7	0	.417	4th NFL Western	–	–	–	–
BAL	1957	7	5	0	.583	3rd NFL Western	–	–	–	–
BAL	1958	9	3	0	.750	1st NFL Western	1	0	1.000	Won NFL Championship over New York Giants
BAL	1959	9	3	0	.750	1st NFL Western	1	0	1.000	Won NFL Championship over New York Giants
BAL	1960	6	6	0	.500	4th NFL Western	–	–	–	–
BAL	1961	8	6	0	.571	T–3rd NFL Western	–	–	–	–
BAL	1962	7	7	0	.500	4th NFL Western	–	–	–	–
BAL Total		59	52	1	.532		2	0	1.000	
NYJ	1963	5	8	1	.385	4th AFL East	–	–	–	–
NYJ	1964	5	8	1	.385	3rd AFL East	–	–	–	–
NYJ	1965	5	8	1	.385	2nd AFL East	–	–	–	–
NYJ	1966	6	6	2	.500	3rd AFL East	–	–	–	–
NYJ	1967	8	5	1	.615	2nd AFL East	–	–	–	–
NYJ	1968	11	3	0	.786	1st AFL East	2	0	1.000	Super Bowl III champions
NYJ	1969	10	4	0	.714	1st AFL East	0	1	.000	Lost to Kansas City Chiefs in Interdivisional Playoffs
NYJ	1970	4	10	0	.286	3rd AFC East	–	–	–	–
NYJ	1971	6	8	0	.429	3rd AFC East	–	–	–	–
NYJ	1972	7	7	0	.500	2nd AFC East	–	–	–	–
NYJ	1973	4	10	0	.286	4th AFC East	–	–	–	–
NYJ Total		71	77	6	.480		2	1	.667	
Total		130	129	7	.502		4	1	.800	
Source: Pro Football Reference

== Coaching tree ==
Assistants under Weeb Ewbank who became NCAA or NFL head coaches:

- Irwin Uteritz: Washington University Bears (1949–1952)
- John Bridgers: Baylor Bears (1959–1968)
- Don Shula: Baltimore Colts (1963–1969), Miami Dolphins (1970–1995)
- Frank Lauterbur: Toledo Rockets (1963–1970), Iowa Hawkeyes (1971–1973)
- Bob Shaw: Saskatchewan Roughriders (1963–1964), Toronto Argonauts (1965–1966), Otterbein College (1985–1987)
- Clive Rush: New England Patriots (1969–1970), Merchant Marine Academy (1976)
- Don McCafferty: Baltimore Colts (1970–1972), Detroit Lions (1973)
- John Sandusky: Baltimore Colts (1972)
- Chuck Knox: Los Angeles Rams (1973–1977), (1992–1994), Buffalo Bills (1978–1982), Seattle Seahawks (1983–1991)
- Charley Winner: St. Louis Cardinals (1966–1970) New York Jets (1974–1975)
- Joe Thomas: Baltimore Colts (1974)
- Walt Michaels: New York Jets (1977–1982), New Jersey Generals (1983–1985)
- Buddy Ryan: Philadelphia Eagles (1986–1990), Arizona Cardinals (1994–1995)

== See also ==
- American Football League players, coaches, and contributors
- List of National Football League head coaches with 50 wins
