= John Riggins =

American football player (born 1949)

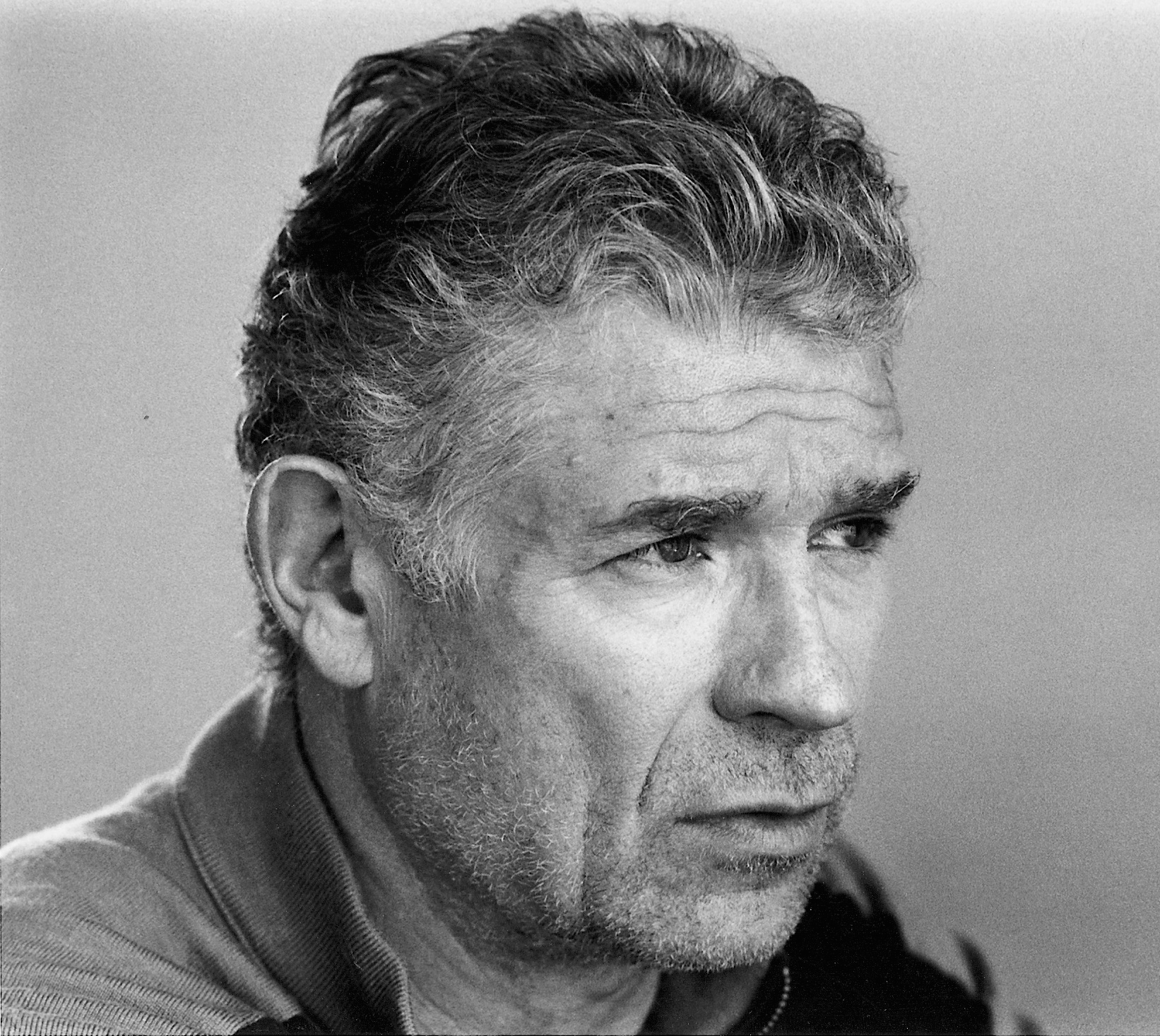
- Riggins in 2014

No. 44
- Position: Running back

Personal information
- Born: August 4, 1949 (age 77); Seneca, Kansas, U.S.
- Listed height: 6 ft 2 in (1.88 m)
- Listed weight: 230 lb (104 kg)

Career information
- High school: Centralia (Centralia, Kansas)
- College: Kansas (1967–1970)
- NFL draft: 1971: 1st round, 6th overall pick

Career history
- New York Jets (1971–1975); Washington Redskins (1976–1985)

Awards and highlights
- Super Bowl champion (XVII); Super Bowl MVP (XVII); NFL Comeback Player of the Year (1978); First-team All-Pro (1983); Pro Bowl (1975); 2× NFL rushing touchdowns leader (1983, 1984); NFL 1980s All-Decade Team; Bert Bell Award (1983); Washington Commanders No. 44 retired; Washington Commanders 90 Greatest; Washington Commanders Ring of Fame; 2× first-team All-Big Eight (1968, 1970); Second-team All-Big Eight (1969); NFL record: Most rushing yards in a postseason: 610 (1982)

Career NFL statistics
- Rushing yards: 11,352
- Rushing average: 3.9
- Rushing touchdowns: 104
- Receptions: 250
- Receiving yards: 2,090
- Receiving touchdowns: 12
- Stats at Pro Football Reference
- Pro Football Hall of Fame

Robert John Riggins (born August 4, 1949), nicknamed "Riggo" and "the Diesel", is a former American professional football running back who played in the National Football League (NFL) for the New York Jets and Washington Redskins. He played college football for the Kansas Jayhawks. Riggins was known for his "bell cow" running style and productivity well into the later years of his career.

In 1983, Riggins rushed for a then-NFL record of 24 touchdowns and led the league in rushing touchdowns the following season. Although he earned only one Pro Bowl appearance in his career, Riggins had his greatest success in the postseason and was named MVP of Super Bowl XVII where he scored one touchdown and rushed for 166 yards in the win for the Redskins. Riggins was inducted into the Pro Football Hall of Fame in 1992.

== Early life ==
Riggins was born in Seneca, Kansas, and is of Irish, English, and Czech ancestry, and attended Centralia High School in Centralia, Kansas. While there, he was a three-sport athlete, earning high school All-American recognition in football, all-state honors in basketball and twice winning the Class B 100-yard dash state title. Riggins high school is now located on John Riggins Avenue, which runs through a main part of Centralia. In October 2012, John with his brothers Frank (Junior) and Bill Riggins were on hand to dedicate the Centralia High School football field renaming it Riggins Field in honoring their parents, Franklin Eugene and Mildred Riggins.

== College career ==
Riggins attended the University of Kansas and played for the Jayhawks, where he was an All-American and two-time All-Big Eight Conference first-team selection. Riggins led the Jayhawks to a Big Eight Conference championship win in 1968. The team then went to the 1969 Orange Bowl, which they lost to Penn State, 15–14.

During his senior season in 1970, Riggins rushed for 1,131 yards and scored a then school-record 14 touchdowns. He finished his career with 2,659 rushing yards, which broke Gale Sayers's career rushing record for the school. Riggins is now ranked fifth for Kansas' all-time rushing leaders and 14th for total yards.

While at Kansas, Riggins majored in journalism.

== Professional career ==
=== New York Jets ===
Riggins was the first running back selected in the 1971 NFL draft, at sixth in the first round, by the New York Jets. As a rookie he became the first Jet to lead the team in both rushing and receiving. On October 15, 1972, the Jets set a team-record of 333 rushing yards against the New England Patriots, beating them 41–13. Riggins, who had 168 yards, and Emerson Boozer, who had 150 yards, became the only running back duo in franchise history who both rushed for 150 yards in a game. Although he missed the final two games in 1972 because of knee surgery, Riggins rushed for 944 yards, four yards less than Matt Snell's franchise record.

Riggins was among the top ten rushers in the American Football Conference in 1974 despite missing four games with a shoulder injury. After only four years with the Jets, he was already the fourth-leading rusher in team history with 2,875 yards. In 1975, Riggins became the first player in franchise history to rush for 1,000 or more yards in a season. On December 21, 1975, he ran for 121 yards against the Dallas Cowboys which gave him 1,005 for the season. In what turned out to be his last season with the Jets, Riggins made his only appearance in the Pro Bowl.

Riggins was named the Jets' MVP (now known as the Martin Award) in 1972 and 1975.

=== Washington Redskins ===
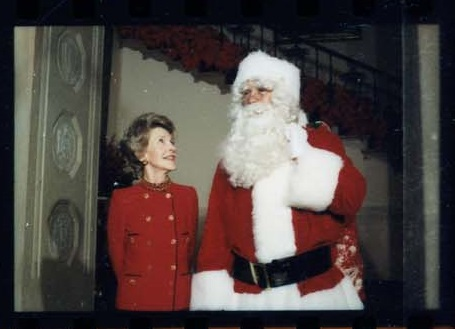
Riggins dressed as Santa Claus at the White House with Nancy Reagan in 1984

In 1976, Riggins signed as a free agent with the Washington Redskins, who offered him a five-year, $1.5 million contract, compared to the $63,000 he earned in his final year with the Jets. He was used mostly in short-yardage situations in his first season with Washington and missed much of the 1977 season with a knee injury. However, Riggins gained more than 1,000 yards each of the next two seasons and was a major part of the Redskins' offense.

==== Contract dispute ====
During training camp in July 1980, Riggins requested to renegotiate his $300,000-per-year contract and the Redskins refused. He then chose to leave camp and the Redskins placed him on the left camp-retired list, a move that made him ineligible to play for any other team in the league. Riggins sat out the 1980 season and did not rejoin the Redskins until 1981, when new Washington head coach Joe Gibbs traveled to Kansas to make a peace offering.

"He had a camouflage outfit on", Gibbs recalled.

He had been hunting, him and a buddy. He had a beer can in his hand. It was 10 o'clock in the morning and he's meeting his coach for the first time and I'm thinking [sarcastically], 'This guy really impresses me.' But I went in there, and halfway through the conversation he says, 'You need to get me back there. I'll make you famous. I thought to myself, 'Oh, my God, he's an egomaniac.' I thought, 'I'll get him back and then I'll trade him. I'm not putting up with a fruitcake.' So I fly back to Washington, and two days later he calls me. He says, 'Joe, I made up my mind, and I'm going to play next season.' I thought it was great. I've got him back, and I'll trade that sucker. But then he says, 'There's only one thing I want in my contract.' I ask what it was. He says, 'A no-trade clause.'

Riggins's return also came at the suggestion of Ed Garvey, who was the executive director of the NFL Players Association.

Eleven months after he left, Riggins returned to training camp in 1981 with a new contract, telling the media "I'm bored, I'm broke, and I'm back."

==== Return to the Redskins ====
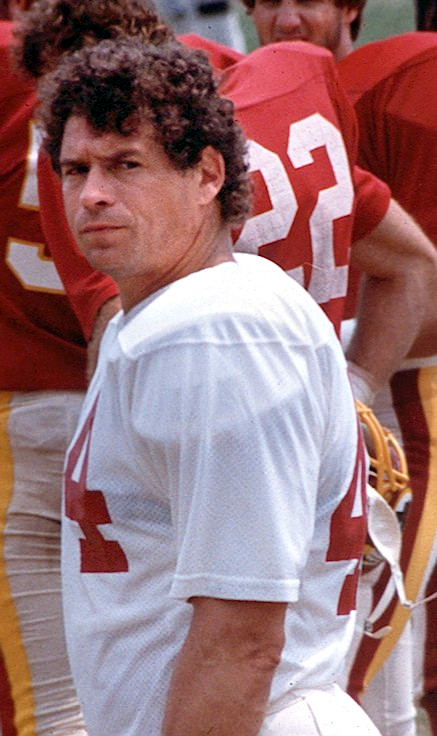
Riggins with the Washington Redskins in 1983

Upon Riggins's return in 1981, he managed just 714 rushing yards but scored 13 touchdowns.

During the strike-shortened 1982 season, Riggins led the team with 553 rushing yards, but averaged just 3.1 yards per carry. He was much more successful during the playoffs, during which he gained 444 yards in victories over the Detroit Lions, Minnesota Vikings (where he had a franchise playoff record 185 yards), and Dallas Cowboys, and helped the Redskins reach Super Bowl XVII. Riggins rushed for a then-Super Bowl record 166 yards on 38 carries as the Redskins beat the Miami Dolphins 27–17. He was then named Super Bowl MVP.

A play that was designed for gaining short yardage called "70 chip" turned out to be the key play of the game. With 10 minutes remaining, Riggins took a handoff on 4th-and-inches, shrugged off a tackle attempt by cornerback Don McNeal, and ran for a 43-yard touchdown. The Super Bowl win was the Redskins' first championship victory since 1942. Riggins' total of 610 yards amounted to 43 percent of Washington's offense in the four playoff games. His four consecutive playoff games with over 100 yards was an NFL postseason record. On December 6, 2007, Riggins' run was voted by fans as the Redskins' Greatest Moment.

The 610 rushing yards and 625 yards from scrimmage he gained in the 1982 playoffs are both single NFL postseason records.

In 1983, Riggins rushed for 1,347 yards, scored a then-NFL record 24 touchdowns, won the Bert Bell Award, and was named All-Pro for the first time in his career. Riggins went on to have another outstanding postseason, rushing for 242 yards and five touchdowns in their two playoff games, extending his NFL record of postseason games with at least 100 rushing yards to six. However, he only rushed for 64 yards and a touchdown in the Redskins' 38–9 Super Bowl XVIII loss against the Los Angeles Raiders.

Two other career milestones happened in the 1983 season for Riggins. On November 20, 1983, he set an NFL record by scoring in his 12th consecutive game during a 42–20 win over the Los Angeles Rams. His record would end at 13 consecutive games the following week. Then on December 17, 1983, Mark Moseley set an NFL kicking record by scoring 161 points in a season, which also made him the league leader in scoring that season. Riggins, who scored 144 points, was second on the season scoring list. This was the first time since 1951 that the top two scorers in a season played on the same team.

Riggins gained 1,239 yards in 1984 and tied for the league lead in rushing TDs (14), despite a bad back. He went over 1,000 yards on Nov. 18, 1984 at the age of 35 years, 3 months and 9 days, becoming the oldest player to rush for over 1,000 yards, eclipsing the record previously held by John Henry Johnson. It is a record that still stands today. In 1985, he rushed for more than 100 yards in three of his last four starts before being replaced by George Rogers as the starter. He retired after that season.

Riggins played 175 games in 14 seasons, had 13,442 total yards (11,352 rushing and 2,090 receiving) and 116 total touchdowns (104 rushing and 12 receiving). Riggins rushed over 1,000 yards five times in his career and over 100 yards in 35 games, including a then-record six in post-season. He rushed 251 times for 996 yards in the playoffs. He also had 12 touchdowns in nine post-season contests, good for fourth all-time tied with Terrell Davis and Marshawn Lynch. He was the second player ever to rush for over 100 touchdowns in NFL history, and the first to do it since Jim Brown reached the milestone in 1965.

== Legacy ==
On October 21, 1990, Riggins and Joe Theismann were inducted into the Redskins' Ring of Fame. As Riggins's name was called, he ran onto the field in full Redskins uniform, including pads, and was received by the crowd at RFK Stadium with thunderous applause. Riggins later explained that he "just had to hear [the roar of the crowd] one more time".

In 1992, he was inducted into the Pro Football Hall of Fame.

On October 13, 2007, Riggins was inducted into the University of Kansas' Ring of Honor at Memorial Stadium.

On November 8, 2026, Riggins number 44 jersey was retired by the Washington Commanders at Northwest Stadium.

== Career statistics ==
Legend
	Super Bowl MVP
	Won the Super Bowl
	NFL record
	Led the league
**Bold**	Career high

=== NFL ===
==== Regular season ====
Year	Team	Games		Rushing					Receiving				
Year	Team	GP	GS	Att	Yds	Avg	Lng	TD	Rec	Yds	Avg	Lng	TD
1971	NYJ	14	14	180	769	4.3	25	1	**36**	231	6.4	32	2
1972	NYJ	12	11	207	944	**4.6**	40	7	21	230	11.0	**67**	1
1973	NYJ	11	9	134	482	3.6	15	4	23	158	6.9	19	0
1974	NYJ	10	10	169	680	4.0	34	5	19	180	9.5	32	2
1975	NYJ	14	14	238	1,005	4.2	42	8	30	**363**	12.1	34	1
1976	WAS	14	14	162	572	3.5	15	3	21	172	8.2	18	1
1977	WAS	5	5	68	203	3.0	12	0	7	95	**13.6**	53	2
1978	WAS	15	15	248	1,014	4.1	31	5	31	299	9.6	33	0
1979	WAS	16	15	260	1,153	4.4	**66**	9	28	163	5.8	23	**3**
1980	WAS	0	0	DNP–contract dispute									
1981	WAS	15	4	195	714	3.7	24	13	6	59	9.8	22	0
1982	WAS	8	8	177	553	3.1	19	3	10	50	5.0	11	0
1983	WAS	15	15	**375**	**1,347**	3.6	44	**24**	5	29	5.8	14	0
1984	WAS	14	14	327	1,239	3.8	24	**14**	7	43	6.1	11	0
1985	WAS	12	11	176	677	3.8	51	8	6	18	3.0	8	0
Career		175	159	2,916	11,352	3.9	66	104	250	2,090	8.4	67	12

==== Postseason ====
Year	Team	Games		Rushing					Receiving				
Year	Team	GP	GS	Att	Yds	Avg	Lng	TD	Rec	Yds	Avg	Lng	TD
1976	WAS	1	1	7	30	4.3	16	0	**4**	**29**	7.3	13	0
1982	WAS	4	4	**136**	**610**	**4.5**	**43**	4	1	15	**15.0**	**15**	0
1983	WAS	3	3	87	306	3.5	23	**6**	1	1	1.0	1	0
1984	WAS	1	1	21	50	2.4	8	2	—	—	—	—	0
Career		9	9	251	996	4.0	43	12	6	45	7.5	15	0

=== College ===
NCAA football statistics
Season	Rushing				Receiving			
Season	Att	Yds	Avg	TD	Rec	Yds	Avg	TD
1968	139	866	**6.2**	6	0	0	0	0
1969	170	662	3.9	1	2	23	**11.5**	0
1970	**209**	**1,131**	5.4	**12**	**7**	**44**	6.3	**2**
Totals	518	2,659	5.1	19	9	67	7.4	2

== Career highlights ==
=== Awards and honors ===
NFL

- Super Bowl champion (XVII)
- Super Bowl MVP (XVII)
- NFL Comeback Player of the Year (1978)
- First-team All-Pro (1983)
- Pro Bowl (1975)
- 2× NFL rushing touchdowns leader (1983, 1984)
- NFL 1980s All-Decade Team
- Bert Bell Award (1983)
- Washington Redskins 90 Greatest
- Washington Redskins Ring of Fame
- Pro Football Hall of Fame (1992)

College

- 2× First-team All-Big Eight (1968, 1970)
- University of Kansas Ring of Honor (2007)

=== NFL records ===
- Most rushing attempts and rushing yards in a single postseason: 136 attempts, 610 yards; 4 playoff games (1982)
- Oldest player to rush for 150+ yards in a game: 35 years, 71 days
- Oldest player to rush for 3 touchdowns in a game: 36 years, 70 days
- Oldest player to have a game with 100+ rushing yards & 1 rushing touchdown: 36 years, 84 days
- Oldest player to have 30+ rushing attempts in a game: 36 years, 84 days
- Oldest player to rush for 100+ yards in a playoff game: 34 years, 157 days (breaking his own record he set one week earlier)
- Oldest player to rush for 150+ yards in a playoff game: 33 years, 179 days
- Oldest player to rush for 175+ yards in a playoff game: 33 years, 164 days
- Most 100-yard rushing games after 35th birthday: 8
- Most games with 20 rushing attempts after 35th birthday: 11
- Oldest player to have 300+ rushing attempts in a season: 35
- Oldest player to have 1,200 rushing yards in a season: 35
- Oldest player to have 10+ rushing touchdowns in a season: 35
- Oldest player to score 20+ touchdowns in a season: 34
- Oldest player to have 350+ rushing attempts in a season: 34
- Oldest player to have 1,300 rushing yards in a season: 34
- Oldest player to have 20+ rushing touchdowns in a season: 34
- Most rushing attempts after 30th birthday: 1,510
- Most rushing touchdowns after 30th birthday: 71
- Most games with 20 rushing attempts after 30th birthday: 36
- Only running back in NFL history with more rushing yards in his 30s than in his 20s.

== After football ==
=== Acting ===
In 1994, he began acting lessons and has since starred in off-off-Broadway productions of the plays Gillette and A Midsummer Night's Dream (in which he played Bottom). His television credits include Guiding Light, Law & Order: Criminal Intent and One Tree Hill.

Riggins' acting career began at Centralia High when a teacher cast him as the lead role in his junior play. His career as a professional actor started in 1992 when he appeared in "Illegal Motion" at the Olney Theatre Center for the Arts. He starred as a beleaguered head football coach accused of inappropriate recruiting practices.

=== Commentating ===
Since retiring from professional football, Riggins has worked as a sports commentator on television and radio.

In 1998, Riggins and Chris Russo hosted Riggins and Russo on Sundays during the football season. The show was aired on WCBS-TV in New York City, focusing primarily on the Jets' and Giants' upcoming games.

Since 2006, Riggins has served as color commentator on Westwood One for the network's weekly national radio broadcast of Sunday Night Football.

On July 18, 2006, Triple X ESPN Radio was launched with Riggins hosting The John Riggins Show. Riggins could be heard in the Washington, D.C. area weekdays from 4-7pm on 94.3 FM, 92.7 FM & 730 AM, WXGI 950 AM in Richmond, Virginia and WXTG-FM 102.1 FM in Virginia Beach, Virginia and WXTG (AM) 1490 in Hampton, Virginia. The last show of the series aired on its second anniversary, July 18, 2008. With the merger of Triple X into WTEM to form ESPN 980, Riggins' afternoon show was replaced by WTEM's afternoon drive show, The Sports Reporters. Riggins stayed with ESPN 980 as a commentator at large.

On January 3, 2008, Riggins co-hosted the 74th Orange Bowl pre-game show. That same night, the Kansas Jayhawks defeated the Virginia Tech Hokies 24–21. It came 39 years after Riggins and the Jayhawks last played in the game in 1969. He offered congratulations to his alma mater in his closing comments, saying "The KU ship's been out at sea since '48. It finally came to port tonight!"

In September 2008, it was announced that Riggins would co-host the program Sirius Blitz with Adam Schein on Satellite Radio Stations Sirius 124 and XM 105. Following his involvement with Sirius Blitz Riggins began hosting his own show, The John Riggins Show, which simulcasts on television and radio on MASN-TV and WTOP-HD3, which airs each weekday afternoon. Riggins has been critical on his radio shows of the current management of the Washington Redskins under owner Dan Snyder.

Previously, he had been a panelist on Redskins Report until that show was canceled in December 2008 due to budget cuts.

In 2016, Riggins returned to ESPN 980 Redskins radio in a variety of roles. Weekly appearances consisted of a one-hour appearance on Tuesdays with Bram Weinstein, a Thursday appearance on Moving Drive with Kevin Sheehan & Chris Cooley and a Friday appearance on Inside The Locker Room with Doc Walker, Brian Mitchell and Scott Jackson. Additionally, Riggins co-hosted the Washington Redskins Radio Network pregame show with Kevin Sheehan before every Redskins game.

== Personal life ==
Riggins has been married twice and has six children: Robert, Portia, Emil, Liberty, Hannah and Coco. He now resides in Cabin John, Maryland near the Potomac River with his wife Lisa Marie.

It was at the 1985 National Press Club's Salute to Congress that Riggins drunkenly told Supreme Court Justice Sandra Day O'Connor to "loosen up, Sandy baby" because she was "too uptight" when the two met at dinner. Riggins then fell asleep under the table. The next time Justice O'Connor and John Riggins met at a function years later, he gave her a dozen roses.
