= W. K. Hicks =

American football player (born 1942)

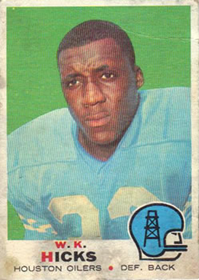

No. 33
- Positions: Cornerback, safety

Personal information
- Born: July 14, 1942; Texarkana, Texas, U.S.
- Died: May 8, 2020 (aged 77); Houston, Texas, U.S.

Career information
- College: Texas Southern
- NFL draft: 1964: undrafted

Career history
- Houston Oilers (1964–1969); New York Jets (1970–1972); Florida Blazers (1974)

Awards and highlights
- AFL All-Star (1966); Second-team All-AFL (1965); AFL interceptions leader (1965); First-team National Association of Intercollegiate Athletics All-America Team (1963)

Career NFL statistics
- Interceptions: 40
- Return yards: 645
- Stats at Pro Football Reference

Wilmer Kenzie " W. K." Hicks Jr. (July 14, 1942 – May 8, 2020) was an American professional football player who was a defensive back for the American Football League (AFL)'s Houston Oilers (1964–1969), and for the National Football League (NFL)'s New York Jets (1970–1972). In 1965, Hicks led the AFL in interceptions (9) and was named second-team All-AFL. He was selected to play in the AFL All-Star Game the following season. Before his professional career, Hicks played college football for the Texas Southern Tigers. As a senior in 1963, he was named a first-team NAIA All-American and first team All-Southwestern Athletic Conference at defensive back.

== Early life ==
Hicks was born on July 14, 1942, in Texarkana, Texas, to Jodye and Wilmer Kenzie Hicks Sr. Hicks's father had played college football at halfback for Texas College in Tyler, Texas. Hicks attended Dunbar High School in Texarkana. He was captain of the football, basketball and track and field teams at Dunbar. He was an all-star linebacker on the football team. Hicks was also a good enough baseball player to have once been offered a professional contract by the Baltimore Orioles to play second base.

== College career ==
Hicks received 10 college scholarship offers, but chose to attend Texas Southern University (TSU), located in Houston, as his father had died and he wanted to be near his home. TSU football coach Alexander Durley had gone to school with Hicks's father, also influencing Hicks's decision. It has also been reported that Hicks attended TSU on a basketball scholarship. Hicks played football for the Texas Southern Tigers in the Southwestern Athletic Conference (SWAC). The SWAC was created in 1920 to serve a group of historically black colleges and universities (HBCU), with TSU joining the SWAC in 1954.

Hicks was a 6 ft 1 in (1.85 m) 190 lb (86.2 kg) defensive back on TSU's football team. He also returned punts. Hicks led the SWAC in interceptions and ran the 100-yard dash in 9.9 seconds or 9.8 seconds. He led TSU in interceptions three times, and set a school career record with 19 interceptions, including a record four interceptions in a single game. Among his TSU teammates was future NFL Pro Bowl wide receiver Homer Jones.

As a sophomore safety in 1961, Hicks was named All-SWAC at defensive back. He led TSU in interceptions and tackles that year. As a senior in 1963, he was selected All-SWAC again at the end of the 1963 season. It has also been reported that he was selected among the SWAC's best defensive backs from 1961 to 1963. In December 1963, Hicks was named a first-team District 6B National Association of Intercollegiate Athletics (NAIA) All-American as a defensive back. At the time, District 6B consisted of HBCU schools in Texas, Arkansas, Louisiana, and Mississippi.

Over his college career, Hicks made key plays in TSU victories. In a late September 1961 game against Southern University, Hicks blocked an extra point conversion attempt in TSU's 14–6 victory. Hicks intercepted three passes in the third quarter of an early October 1961 game against Prairie View. Two of those interceptions were in the end zone and stopped Prairie View scoring drives. His 36-yard punt return against Prairie View in early October 1962 helped set up the game-winning touchdown. His interception on TSU's three-yard line in a November 1963 game against Arkansas AM&N was a key play in TSU's 6–0 victory. Just one week earlier, Hicks had intercepted a fourth quarter pass in the endzone against Jackson State, and then with less than one minute to play he intercepted another pass to stop a Jackson State scoring drive and preserve a 6–0 TSU win.

== Professional career ==
=== Houston Oilers ===
Hicks had been scouted by the Minnesota Vikings of the National Football League (NFL) at TSU, but was not drafted by any NFL or AFL teams in 1964. He was signed by Red Conkright of the Houston Oilers in the American Football League (AFL). Hicks was moved to starting right cornerback during the Oilers' 1964 preseason after cornerback Tony Banfield suffered an injury. Encouragement from Oilers' safety Fred Glick during the preseason helped Hicks in believing that Hicks could play in professional football.

Hicks was the standout player during the Oilers' 1964 training camp. Known by the nickname "Contact", during an exhibition game against the Boston Patriots' he hit wide receiver Jim Colclough so hard after one reception that Colclough was knocked unconscious. When Colclough revived, he was only able to stand few seconds before falling to his knees, and then attempted to walk on his knees before being helped off of the field. Hicks also did well in exhibition games against established AFL stars Lance Alworth and Lionel Taylor. In his rookie season of 1964, Hicks started seven of 14 games in which he appeared, and had five interceptions. In an October 4 game against the Kansas City Chiefs, Hicks intercepted two passes against future Pro Football Hall of Fame quarterback Len Dawson.

In Hicks's second season (1965) he started all 14 games. Hicks led the AFL in interceptions (9) and interception return yards (156). He also returned one punt and seven kickoffs (for 181 yards). In a September 19 game against the Boston Patriots Hicks had two interceptions. In an October 31 game against the Buffalo Bills, Hicks's late fourth quarterback interception set up George Blanda's game-winning field goal for the Oilers. He had three interceptions overall in that game. Only two touchdown passes were thrown against him individually in 1965.

In 1965, Hicks was named to the All-AFL second team by the Associated Press (AP), Newspaper Enterprise Association (NEA) and United Press International (UPI). The Houston media expressed surprise that San Diego Chargers' head coach Sid Gillman did not select Hicks as a member of the 1965 AFL All-Star Team, instead selecting Leslie "Speedy" Duncan from the Chargers (who was also a top punt and kickoff returner) and Denver's Willie Brown (who only played half of the season) ahead of Hicks.

Hicks served United State Air Force Reserve duty after the 1965 season, returning to the Oilers at the end of June 1966. Hicks started 12 games in 1966 with three interceptions, but was named to the AFL All-Star Game for the only time in his career. He was selected by Boston Patriots' head coach Mike Holovak. On October 16, he had two interceptions against future Pro Football Hall of Fame quarterback Joe Namath. In 1967, he started all 14 Oilers' games with three interceptions and one fumble recovery. In the second game of the season against the Buffalo Bills, Hicks intercepted a Jack Kemp pass and returned it 62 yards.

Hicks started all 14 Oilers games again in 1968, playing both right cornerback and free safety. He had three interceptions. Hicks ended his AFL and Oiler career in 1969 with four interceptions in nine starts, playing free safety. In the AFL era with the Oilers, he had 27 interceptions, which was 17th most in the history of the league. After the 1969 season, the AFL fully merged into the National Football League.

=== New York Jets ===
During the January 1970 NFL draft, the Oilers traded Hicks to the New York Jets for a fifth-round draft choice (Ron Saul). Hicks played for the New York Jets for three seasons and recorded 13 combined interceptions, with eight coming in 1970. In 1970, playing free safety, Hicks's eight interceptions were tied for third best in the NFL. During the 1970 season, he had two games with two interceptions in each game. On October 18 he had two interceptions against Johnny Unitas and the Baltimore Colts; and on November 29 he had two interceptions against the Minnesota Vikings.

Hicks started 12 games for the Jets in 1971, playing free safety. He had four interceptions and a fumble recovery. He closed his NFL career with three starts in 1972 and one interception, to get to 40 for a career. His final career interception came against Earl Morrall and the 1972 Miami Dolphins on November 19, 1972; returning it 43 yards. This was Hicks's last NFL season. At the time, he was one of just 38 players with 40 total interceptions in football history.

=== World Football League ===
He ended his professional career by playing for the Florida Blazers of the World Football League in 1974. He played little in the Blazers' first two games, and was released in July, before the Blazers' third game.

== Legacy ==
Houston Oilers' defensive backs coach Walt Schlinkman said of Hicks, "'You've seen him out there on the practice field . . . What else can you say about him except that he's a natural. He has good hands, good feet, speed, quick reactions and the knack of being in the right place at the right time. That's something you can't bring out by coaching. It's just there'". Schlinkman also found Hicks to be a quick study in learning receivers' traits by film study, and applying that in games.

== Personal life and death ==
In 1989, Hicks became doorman at the Lancaster Hotel in downtown Houston, where he worked for 20 years. He also became and head captain at the Lancaster. Hicks had been hired by the hotel's concierge Dilys Lentz, who had asked him to become the hotel's ambassador to every guest who arrived there. When the 87-year old Lentz retired in 2012, she stated she was particularly proud of having hired Hicks, who became well known for his geniality and the attention he gave to each individual he encountered. He was known in Houston, and in 2008 the Houston Chronicle sought him out for an interview and article on his observations and opinions about how the city had grown and changed during his time at the Lancaster. Hicks died on May 8, 2020 at the age of 77, in Houston.

== See also ==
- Other American Football League players
