= Joey Jackson =

American gridiron football player (born 1950)

Joe Jackson
No. 86, 76
- Positions: Defensive end, linebacker

Personal information
- Born: May 7, 1950 (age 76); Cincinnati, Ohio, U.S.
- Listed height: 6 ft 4 in (1.93 m)
- Listed weight: 270 lb (122 kg)

Career information
- High school: Withrow (Cincinnati)
- College: New Mexico State
- NFL draft: 1972: 6th round, 139th overall pick

Career history
- New York Jets (1972–1973); New York Stars (1974); Charlotte Hornets (1974); Jacksonville Express (1975); Minnesota Vikings (1977); Edmonton Eskimos (1978)

Awards and highlights
- All Rookie Team 1972; New Mexico State Hall of Fame

Career NFL statistics
- Games played: 20
- Stats at Pro Football Reference

William Joseph Jackson (born May 7, 1950) is an American former professional football player who was a defensive end in the National Football League (NFL) for the New York Jets and Minnesota Vikings. He finished second in quarterback sacks as a rookie. He is currently an evangelist to athletes and conference speaker to Christian men's groups throughout the United States. He also played in the World Football League (WFL) and Canadian Football League (CFL).

He attended and played for the New Mexico State University and was also elected to the New Mexico State University hall of fame. He was later picked in the sixth round of the 1972 NFL draft by the New York Jets. He was in the Superstar Sports Magazine all rookie team.
