= Hank Bjorklund =

American football player (born 1950)

No. 40
- Position: Running back

Personal information
- Born: June 5, 1950 (age 76); Glen Head, New York, U.S.
- Listed height: 6 ft 1 in (1.85 m)
- Listed weight: 200 lb (91 kg)

Career information
- High school: North Shore (Glen Head)
- College: Princeton
- NFL draft: 1972: 12th round, 299th overall pick

Career history
- New York Jets (1972–1974)

Awards and highlights
- First-team All-East (1971); Second-team All-East (1970)

Career NFL statistics
- Games played: 30
- Rushing yards: 171
- Stats at Pro Football Reference

John Henry Bjorklund (born June 5, 1950) is an American former professional football player who was a running back for the New York Jets of the National Football League (NFL) from 1972 to 1974. He played college football for the Princeton Tigers.
