= Gus Hollomon =

American football player (born 1945)

No. 34, 48
- Positions: Defensive back, Punter

Personal information
- Born: October 23, 1945 (age 81); Beaumont, Texas, U.S.
- Listed height: 6 ft 3 in (1.91 m)
- Listed weight: 195 lb (88 kg)

Career information
- High school: French (Beaumont)
- College: Houston
- NFL draft: 1968: 4th round, 111th overall pick

Career history
- Denver Broncos (1968-1969); New York Jets (1970–1972)

Career NFL/AFL statistics
- Interceptions: 8
- Fumble recoveries: 4
- Sacks: 1
- Punts: 47
- Punt yards: 1,868
- Longest punt: 57
- Stats at Pro Football Reference

Gus Martin Hollomon (born October 23, 1945) is an American former professional football player who was a defensive back in the American Football League (AFL) and National Football League (NFL). He played college football for the Houston Cougars .

== Football career ==
He played five seasons for the AFL's Denver Broncos (1968–1969) and the NFL's New York Jets (1970–1972).
