= Steve Thompson (defensive tackle, born 1945) =

American football player (born 1945)

No. 85, 87, 86
- Positions: Defensive tackle, Defensive end

Personal information
- Born: February 12, 1945 (age 81); Seattle, Washington, U.S.
- Listed height: 6 ft 5 in (1.96 m)
- Listed weight: 250 lb (113 kg)

Career information
- High school: Lake Stevens (Lake Stevens, Washington)
- College: Washington (1963-1967)
- NFL draft: 1968: 2nd round, 44th overall pick

Career history
- New York Jets (1968–1970, 1972–1973); Portland Storm (1974); BC Lions (1975)

Awards and highlights
- Super Bowl champion (III); AFL champion (1968); 2× First-team All-Pac-8 (1966, 1967)

Career NFL/AFL statistics
- Fumble recoveries: 1
- Sacks: 8.5
- Stats at Pro Football Reference

Steve Thompson (born February 12, 1945) is an American former professional football player who was a defensive tackle in the National Football League (NFL). He played high school football at Lake Stevens High School and college football at the Washington Huskies in Seattle under head coach Jim Owens.

Selected in the second round of the 1968 NFL/AFL draft (44th overall), Thompson spent five seasons with the New York Jets in 1968–1970 and 1972–1973 before playing with the Portland Storm of the World Football League (WFL) in 1974 and the B.C. Lions of the Canadian Football League (CFL) in 1975.

From 1991 to August 2015, he was the senior pastor at Victory Foursquare Church in Marysville, Washington. He received a doctoral degree in Transformational Leadership from Bakke Graduate University in 2020.
