= Bobby Howfield =

English player of association football and American football

- Born: 3 December 1936 (age 89); Watford, England
Association football career
- Position: Forward
Youth career
- 1957: Millwall
Senior career*
Years	Team	Apps	(Gls)
1957–1959	Watford	47	(9)
1959	Crewe Alexandra	5	(0)
1959–1962	Aldershot	76	(44)
1962–1963	Watford	45	(13)
1963–1965	Fulham	26	(9)
1965	New York Americans	?	(?)
1965–1967	Aldershot	34	(10)
1967–1968	Chelmsford City	?	(?)
- * Club domestic league appearances and goals
Bobby Howfield
Profile
- Position: Placekicker
Personal information
- Listed height: 5 ft 9 in (1.75 m)
- Listed weight: 180 lb (82 kg)
Career history
- 1968–1970: Denver Broncos
- 1971–1974: New York Jets
- Stats at Pro Football Reference

Robert Michael Howfield (born 3 December 1936) is an English former professional sportsman who played both association football and American football.

== Early and personal life ==
Howfield was born in Watford. His son Ian Howfield kicked for the Houston Oilers in 1991.

== Career ==
=== Association football ===
Howfield played as a forward, known for his volatility. Howfield began his association football career with local side Bushey F.C., before signing amateur terms with Millwall in May 1957. He became a professional with Watford in September 1957, playing for the club until July 1959, when he moved to Crewe Alexandra. In October 1959, however, he moved to Aldershot, where his 23 league goals in the 1961–62 season were a club record for a number of years. He played for the club until July 1962 when he returned to Watford for a "substantial fee".

Howfield moved to Fulham in November 1965 for £6000, having made 101 appearances and scored 25 goals in his two spells with the club. He scored three goals for Fulham in the last ten goal performance by a top-flight club.

During 1965 Howfield went to play with the New York Americans of the International Soccer League. He returned to Aldershot in August 1965, playing for the Hampshire club until 1967, before playing non-League football with Chelmsford City.

=== American football ===
Known for his powerful kicks, Howfield returned to America to take up American football as a placekicker. Between 1968 and 1970 he played for the Denver Broncos. Following the 1970 season, the Broncos traded Howfield to the New York Jets for Jim Turner. He played for the Jets until 1974.

== Later life ==
After his retirement from sport, Howfield worked in the insurance department of a Denver bank, and he still lives close to the city.
