= Cliff McClain =

American football player (born 1947)

No. 42
- Position: Running back

Personal information
- Born: December 29, 1947 (age 78); Orlando, Florida, U.S.
- Listed height: 6 ft 0 in (1.83 m)
- Listed weight: 217 lb (98 kg)

Career information
- High school: Orlando
- College: South Carolina State
- NFL draft: 1970: 5th round, 108th overall pick

Career history
- New York Jets (1970–1973); Florida Blazers (1974)

Career NFL statistics
- Rushing attempts: 79
- Rushing yards: 445
- Rushing TDs: 2
- Stats at Pro Football Reference

Clifford M. McClain (born December 29, 1947) is an American former professional football player who was a running back for the New York Jets of the National Football League (NFL). He played college football for the South Carolina State Bulldogs.

After four seasons as a backup running back with the Jets, McClain signed as a free agent with the St. Louis Cardinals before the 1974 season, which led to the Jets receiving linebacker Jamie Rivers and offensive guard Roger Bernhardt as compensation. During the 1974 preseason, he was traded to the Chicago Bears as part of a package for wide receiver Earl Thomas, but was cut by the Bears. He then played the 1974 season for the Florida Blazers of the World Football League (WFL). McClain attempted to rejoin the NFL in 1975 but was cut after a tryout with the Atlanta Falcons.
