= Bob Svihus =

American football player (born 1943)

No. 76
- Position: Offensive tackle

Personal information
- Born: June 21, 1943 (age 83); Los Angeles, California, U.S.
- Listed height: 6 ft 4 in (1.93 m)
- Listed weight: 245 lb (111 kg)

Career information
- High school: Sequoia (Redwood City, California)
- College: USC (1961-1964)
- NFL draft: 1965: 4th round, 53rd overall pick
- AFL draft: 1965: 3rd round, 19th overall pick

Career history
- Oakland Raiders (1965–1970); New York Jets (1971–1973)

Awards and highlights
- AFL champion (1967); National champion (1962); Second-team All-AAWU (1964)

Career NFL/AFL statistics
- Games played: 122
- Games started: 102
- Fumble recoveries: 1
- Stats at Pro Football Reference

Robert Craig Svihus (born June 21, 1943) is an American former professional football player who was an offensive tackle in the American Football League (AFL) and the National Football League (NFL) for the Oakland Raiders and New York Jets. He played college football for the USC Trojans.

== Early life ==
Svihus attended Sequoia High School, where he practiced football, basketball and baseball.

In football he played at guard and tackle, while being a part of the 1959 and 1960 undefeated teams. As a senior, he received All S.P.A.L. and All Northern California honors.

In 1991, he was inducted into the San Mateo County Sports Hall of Fame.

== College career ==
Svihus accepted a football scholarship from the University of Southern California. As a sophomore in 1962, he was a part of an undefeated team that won the Rose Bowl and the national championship.

As a senior in 1964, he became a starter at left tackle and received second-team All-AAWU honors.

== Professional career ==
=== Oakland Raiders ===
Svihus was selected by the Oakland Raiders in the third round (19th overall) of the 1965 AFL draft and by the Dallas Cowboys in the fourth round (53rd overall) of the 1965 NFL draft.

He chose to sign with the Oakland Raiders, becoming a starter at left tackle as a rookie, to protect quarterback Tom Flores. He would keep the job until 1969, while protecting quarterback Daryle Lamonica and missing only one game. In 1967, he played in Super Bowl II, a 14–33 loss against the Green Bay Packers.

In 1970 after the AFL–NFL merger, he was replaced at left tackle by future Hall of Famer Art Shell and started only 1 game. On August 26, 1971, he was traded to the New York Jets in exchange for a second round pick (#39-John Babinecz).

=== New York Jets ===
Svihus was the starter at left tackle from 1971 to 1972, protecting quarterback Joe Namath. In 1973, he only started 4 games after being passed on the depth chart by Robert Woods. He retired on September 10, 1974.

== Personal life ==
Svihus co-wrote a book with Wayne Hawkins (Oakland Raiders offensive guard) and Dave Dalby (Oakland Raiders center) called Raider: How Offensive can you be? A 25-year history of the Oakland Raiders. The book was published by Peninsula Publishing in Monterey, California and was written in 1986–1987.

== See also ==
- Other American Football League players
