= Bill Zapalac =

American football player (born 1948)

No. 53
- Positions: Linebacker, defensive end

Personal information
- Born: September 1, 1948 (age 78); Bellville, Texas, U.S.
- Listed height: 6 ft 5 in (1.96 m)
- Listed weight: 225 lb (102 kg)

Career information
- High school: McCallum (Austin, Texas)
- College: Texas
- NFL draft: 1971: 4th round, 84th overall pick

Career history
- New York Jets (1971–1973)

Awards and highlights
- 2× National champion (1969, 1970)

Career NFL statistics
- Games played: 33
- Stats at Pro Football Reference

Willie Frank Zapalac Jr. (born September 1, 1948) is an American former professional football player who was a linebacker and defensive end for the New York Jets of the National Football League (NFL). He played college football for the Texas Longhorns football.

== College football ==
Zapalac attended the University of Texas at Austin and played college football for the Longhorns. He was a 3-time academic all-conference and twice was named Academic All American in 1969 and 1970. In 1970, he was elected as one of the four captains and was named to the National Football Foundation Academic All American team. Zapalac started 33 straight games while playing 3 different positions on Texas teams that had a combined record of 30–2–1. He graduated from the school of Architectural Engineering with Honors. In 2011, he was inducted in the University of Texas Hall of Honor.

== Professional Athletic career ==
Zapalac was a fourth-round selection (84th overall pick) in the 1971 NFL draft by the New York Jets. He played for three years with the Jets (1971–1973).

== Professional career ==
Since retiring from football, Bill has worked in the construction industry since 1974. For the past 28 years he has been president of Zapalac/Reed Construction in Austin, Texas. University of Texas 2023 Distinguished Alumni of Civil, Architectural, Environmental Engineering department.
