= Rich Sowells =

American football player (born 1948)

No. 46, 29
- Position: Cornerback

Personal information
- Born: October 27, 1948; Prairie View, Texas, U.S.
- Died: August 24, 2024 (aged 75)
- Listed height: 6 ft 0 in (1.83 m)
- Listed weight: 179 lb (81 kg)

Career information
- High school: Sam Houston (Huntsville, Texas)
- College: Alcorn State
- NFL draft: 1971: 12th round, 292nd overall pick

Career history
- New York Jets (1971–1976); Houston Oilers (1977)

Career NFL statistics
- Games played - started: 78 - 13
- Interceptions: 10
- Touchdowns: 1
- Stats at Pro Football Reference

Richard Allen Sowells (born October 27, 1948 - died August 23, 2024) was an American former professional football cornerback in the National Football League (NFL). He played seven seasons for the New York Jets and the Houston Oilers.
