= Steve Harkey =

American football player (born 1949)

No. 36
- Position: Running back

Personal information
- Born: August 3, 1949 (age 77); Atlanta, Georgia, U.S.
- Listed height: 6 ft 0 in (1.83 m)
- Listed weight: 215 lb (98 kg)

Career information
- High school: The Westminster Schools (Atlanta)
- College: Georgia Tech
- NFL draft: 1971: 16th round, 396th overall pick

Career history
- New York Jets (1971–1972)

Career NFL statistics
- Rushing attempts-yards: 65-191
- Receptions-yards: 14-142
- Stats at Pro Football Reference

Stephen Douglas Harkey (born August 3, 1949) is an American former professional football player who was a running back for the New York Jets of the National Football League (NFL). He played college football for the Georgia Tech Yellow Jackets.
