= Phil Wise (American football) =

American football player (1949–2026)

No. 27, 29
- Position: Defensive back

Personal information
- Born: April 25, 1949; Omaha, Nebraska, U.S.
- Died: March 12, 2026 (aged 76); Minneapolis, Minnesota, U.S.
- Listed height: 6 ft 0 in (1.83 m)
- Listed weight: 190 lb (86 kg)

Career information
- College: South Dakota; Nebraska–Omaha
- NFL draft: 1971: 6th round, 136th overall pick

Career history
- New York Jets (1971–1976); Minnesota Vikings (1977–1979)

Career NFL statistics
- Interceptions: 6
- Fumble recoveries: 9
- Defensive TDs: 1
- Stats at Pro Football Reference

Phil Wise (April 25, 1949 – March 12, 2026) was an American professional football player who was a defensive back in the National Football League (NFL). He was selected by the New York Jets in the sixth round (136th overall) of the 1971 NFL draft. Wise was 6 ft 0 in (1.83 m), 192 lb (87 kg) safety who played college football for the South Dakota Coyotes and Nebraska–Omaha Mavericks. Wise played in nine NFL seasons from 1971 to 1976 with the Jets, and 1977 to 1979 with the Minnesota Vikings. He finished his NFL career with 92 games and six interceptions.

Wise was also a member on The KQ92 Morning Show with Tom Barnard on KQRS-FM in Minneapolis, Minnesota. He died on March 12, 2026, at the age of 76. He was interred at Forest Lawn Memorial Park in Omaha.
