= John Ebersole (American football) =

American football player (born 1948)

No. 55
- Position: Linebacker

Personal information
- Born: November 5, 1948 (age 78); Altoona, Pennsylvania, U.S.
- Listed height: 6 ft 3 in (1.91 m)
- Listed weight: 235 lb (107 kg)

Career information
- High school: Altoona Area
- College: Penn State
- NFL draft: 1970: 4th round, 98th overall pick

Career history
- New York Jets (1970–1977)
- Stats at Pro Football Reference

John Joel Ebersole (born November 5, 1948) is an American former professional football player who was a linebacker for the New York Jets of the National Football League (NFL) from 1970 to 1977. He played college football for the Penn State Nittany Lions and was selected in the fourth round of the 1970 NFL draft.
