= Earlie Thomas =

American football player (1945–2022)

No. 45, 48
- Position: Cornerback

Personal information
- Born: December 11, 1945; Denton, Texas, U.S.
- Died: July 3, 2022 (aged 76)
- Listed height: 6 ft 1 in (1.85 m)
- Listed weight: 190 lb (86 kg)

Career information
- College: Colorado State
- NFL draft: 1970: 11th round, 280th overall pick

Career history
- New York Jets (1970–1974); Denver Broncos (1975)

Career NFL statistics
- Interceptions: 7
- Interception yards: 151
- Touchdowns: 1
- Stats at Pro Football Reference

Earlie Bee Thomas (December 11, 1945 – July 3, 2022) was an American professional football player who was a cornerback in the National Football League (NFL). He was selected by the New York Jets in the 11th round of the 1970 NFL draft. He played college football for the Colorado State Rams.

Born in Denton, Texas, Thomas also played for the Denver Broncos.
