= John Mooring =

American football player (born 1947)

No. 71, 73
- Positions: Tackle, center

Personal information
- Born: May 8, 1947 (age 79); Falfurrias, Texas, U.S.
- Listed height: 6 ft 6 in (1.98 m)
- Listed weight: 255 lb (116 kg)

Career information
- High school: Falfurrias
- College: Tampa
- NFL draft: 1971: 2nd round, 32nd overall pick

Career history
- New York Jets (1971–1973); New Orleans Saints (1974)
- Stats at Pro Football Reference

John Mooring (born May 8, 1947) is an American former professional football player who was a tackle and center in the National Football League (NFL). He played college football for the Tampa Spartans football and was selected in the second round of the 1971 NFL draft. Mooring played in the NFL for the New York Jets from 1971 to 1973 and for the New Orleans Saints in 1974.
