= Ralph Baker (linebacker) =

American football player (born 1942)

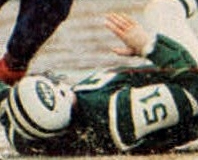

No. 51
- Position: Linebacker

Personal information
- Born: August 25, 1942 (age 84); Lewistown, Pennsylvania, U.S.
- Listed height: 6 ft 3 in (1.91 m)
- Listed weight: 232 lb (105 kg)

Career information
- High school: Lewistown
- College: Penn State
- NFL draft: 1964: 3rd round, 38th overall pick
- AFL draft: 1964: 6th round, 43rd overall pick

Career history

Playing
- New York Jets (1964–1974)

Coaching
- New York Jets (1980–1984) Linebackers coach

Awards and highlights
- Super Bowl champion (III); AFL champion (1968); AFCA Coaches All-America Game 1963

Career NFL/AFL statistics
- Interceptions: 19
- Fumble recoveries: 2
- Total touchdowns: 2
- Sacks: 14
- Stats at Pro Football Reference

Ralph Robert Baker (born August 25, 1942) is an American former professional football player and coach.

A talented linebacker at Penn State, Baker was selected in both the 1964 AFL and NFL drafts—the Pittsburgh Steelers selected him with their third round pick, while the New York Jets used their sixth round pick to select him. Baker elected to sign with New York and played linebacker position for 141 games over 11 seasons (1964–1974). This included the Jets' Super Bowl III victory.

== College career ==
Baker played college football at Penn State University. He co-captained the 1963 Penn State team and played in the East-West, Coaches’ All-America and College All-Star games plus the Hula Bowl. He also appeared in two Gator Bowls. Baker played both ways as a center on offense and linebacker on defense for the Nittany Lions. He was a member of Sigma Pi fraternity.

== Professional career ==
Baker was selected in the third round of the 1964 NFL draft by the Steelers and in the sixth round of the AFL draft by the Jets, he played 11 seasons from 1964 to 1974 at OLB and MLB for the Jets. His 141 games, all as a starter, are 25th most in club history. He was defensive captain from 1973-74, notched 19 career interceptions and 14 sacks. Baker made two memorable plays in the 1968 postseason. He recovered an errant lateral from Daryle Lamonica to Charley Smith in the AFL championship game at Shea stadium to halt the Raiders’ attack with 2 minutes to go, preserving the win. Then, in Super Bow III, Baker recovered a Tom Matte fumble to set up a Jets’ field goal in third quarter.

He retired during training camp in 1975 and remained with club for a year as a scout. Becoming the 1st former Jet player to join the club's coaching staff in 1980, Baker was the NY Jets Linebackers coach for 5 seasons from 1980-84 where he mentored fellow Penn State linebackers... Greg Buttle and Lance Mehl as players on the Jets roster.

== Personal and later life ==
Baker spent the many years in the Pennsylvania school system. He was teacher and assistant football coach at East Juniata High in 1976. He served as head coach of football, basketball and track at his alma mater, Lewistown High. In 1978 he earned master’s degree in education from Penn State and was assistant principal at Chief Logan High in Burnham. He was principal at TriValley High in Hegins in 1979. He retired as principal of Tuscarora Junior High School in Mifflintown, Pennsylvania, in 2010.

Baker has a wife Betsy, daughter Carolyn, and son Kevin.

== See also ==
- List of American Football League players
