= John Little (American football) =

American football player (1947–1997)

No. 57, 80, 72
- Positions: Defensive tackle, defensive end

Personal information
- Born: May 3, 1947; Tallulah, Louisiana, U.S.
- Died: July 9, 1997 (aged 50); Hot Coffee, Mississippi, U.S.
- Listed height: 6 ft 3 in (1.91 m)
- Listed weight: 241 lb (109 kg)

Career information
- High school: Langston (AR)
- College: Oklahoma State
- NFL draft: 1970: 14th round, 358th overall pick

Career history
- New York Jets (1970–1974); Houston Oilers (1975–1976); Buffalo Bills (1977)

Awards and highlights
- Second-team All-American (1969); 2× First-team All-Big Eight (1968, 1969); Second-team All-Big Eight (1967)

Career NFL statistics
- Sacks: 18
- Fumble recoveries: 3
- Stats at Pro Football Reference

John D. Little Jr. (May 3, 1947 – July 9, 1997) was an American professional football defensive end who played in the National Football League (NFL) for the New York Jets, the Houston Oilers, and the Buffalo Bills. Little played college football at Oklahoma State University. He played in college at Oklahoma State. His first five seasons in the NFL were with the Jets. He played in 110 NFL games starting in 39.

He was from Hot Springs, Arkansas.
