= 1974 New York Jets season =

1974 season of NFL team New York Jets

- Owner: Leon Hess
- Head coach: Charley Winner
- Home stadium: Shea Stadium

Results
- Record: 7–7
- Division place: 3rd AFC East
- Playoffs: Did not qualify
- Pro Bowlers: TE Rich Caster

The 1974 New York Jets season was the fifteenth season for the team and the fifth in the National Football League. It began with the team trying to improve upon its 4–10 record from 1973 under new head coach Charley Winner. After beginning the season 1–7, the Jets won six straight and finished with a record of 7–7. During the streak were home upsets of playoff-bound Miami and Buffalo, wins over the other division teams New England and Baltimore, and a victory over the crosstown rival Giants which was the first NFL game decided in overtime.

== Offseason ==
=== Draft ===
1974 New York Jets draft
Round	Pick	Player	Position	College	Notes
1	6	Carl Barzilauskas	Defensive tackle	Indiana	
2	31	Gordie Browne	Tackle	Boston College	
3	58	Godwin Turk	Linebacker	Southern	Played with Jets in 1975
3	74	Roscoe Word	Defensive back	Jackson State	
5	110	Gary Baccus	Linebacker	Oklahoma	
6	135	Bill Wyman	Center	Texas	
6	137	Wayne Jones	Running back	Mississippi State	
7	162	Burney Veazey	Tight end	Ole Miss	
8	187	Greg Gantt	Punter	Alabama	
8	192	Larry Lightfoot	Running back	Livingston	
8	197	Ron Rydalch	Defensive tackle	Utah	
9	214	Robert Burns	Running back	Georgia	
10	239	Sam Baker	Guard	Georgia	
11	266	Eugene Bird	Defensive back	Southern Miss	
11	267	Bill Buckley	Wide receiver	Mississippi State	
12	291	John Ricca	Defensive end	Duke	
13	318	John Tate	Linebacker	Jackson State	
14	343	Greg Fountain	Guard	Mississippi State	
15	370	Willie Brister	Tight end	Southern	
16	395	Jazz Jackson	Running back	Western Kentucky	
17	422	Doug Lowrey	Guard	Arkansas State	
Made roster

== Roster ==
1974 New York Jets roster
Quarterbacks (QB): 6 Bill Demory; 12 Joe Namath; 18 Al Woodall; Running backs (RB): 1 Mike Adamle; 40 Hank Bjorklund; 32 Emerson Boozer; 33 Bob Burns; 43 Jazz Jackson; 44 John Riggins; Wide receivers (WR): 83 Jerome Barkum; 7 Eddie Bell; 82 David Knight; 37 Marv Owens; 89 Lou Piccone; Tight ends (TE): 86 Willie Brister; 88 Rich Caster	Offensive linemen (OL): 68 Roger Bernhardt G; 79 Gordie Browne T; 75 Winston Hill T; 59 Howard Kindig C; 50 Wayne Mulligan C; 77 Garry Puetz G; 66 Randy Rasmussen G; 63 Travis Roach G; 72 Robert Woods T; Defensive linemen (DL): 77 Carl Barzilauskas DT; 85 Ed Galigher DE; 57 John Little DE; 81 Richard Neal DE; 74 Joe Schmiesing DT; 70 Larry Woods DT	Linebackers (LB): 62 Al Atkinson MLB; 51 Ralph Baker OLB; 55 John Ebersole OLB; 58 Bill Ferguson OLB; 53 Rich Lewis OLB; 52 Steve Reese OLB; 54 Jamie Rivers MLB; Defensive backs (DB): 20 Delles Howell CB; 22 Burgess Owens SS; 46 Rich Sowells CB; 21 Steve Tannen FS; 45 Earlie Thomas CB; 27 Phil Wise FS; 47 Roscoe Word CB; Special teams (ST): 8 Greg Gantt P; 5 Pat Leahy K	Reserve: 26 Margene Adkins WR (IR); 23 Jerry Bond S (IR); 3 Bobby Howfield K (IR); 11 J. J. Jones QB (IR); 53 Warren Koegel C (IR); 84 Mark Lomas DE (IR); 56 Godwin Turk LB (IR); Rookies in italics

== Regular season ==
=== Schedule ===
Week	Date	Opponent	Result	Record	Venue	Attendance	Recap
1	September 15	at Kansas City Chiefs	**L** 16–24	0–1	Arrowhead Stadium	74,854	Recap
2	September 22	at Chicago Bears	**W** 23–21	1–1	Soldier Field	50,213	Recap
3	September 29	at **Buffalo Bills**	**L** 12–16	1–2	Rich Stadium	76,978	Recap
4	October 7	at **Miami Dolphins**	**L** 17–21	1–3	Miami Orange Bowl	60,727	Recap
5	October 13	**New England Patriots**	**L** 0–24	1–4	Shea Stadium	57,825	Recap
6	October 20	**Baltimore Colts**	**L** 20–35	1–5	Shea Stadium	51,745	Recap
7	October 27	Los Angeles Rams	**L** 13–20	1–6	Shea Stadium	56,110	Recap
8	November 3	Houston Oilers	**L** 22–27	1–7	Shea Stadium	47,218	Recap
9	November 10	at New York Giants	**W** 26–20 (OT)	2–7	Yale Bowl	64,327	Recap
10	November 17	at **New England Patriots**	**W** 21–16	3–7	Schaefer Stadium	57,115	Recap
11	November 24	**Miami Dolphins**	**W** 17–14	4–7	Shea Stadium	57,162	Recap
12	December 1	San Diego Chargers	**W** 27–14	5–7	Shea Stadium	44,888	Recap
13	December 8	**Buffalo Bills**	**W** 20–10	6–7	Shea Stadium	61,091	Recap
14	December 15	at **Baltimore Colts**	**W** 45–38	7–7	Memorial Stadium	31,651	Recap
Note: Intra-division opponents are in **bold** text.

=== Standings ===
AFC East
	W	L	T	PCT	DIV	CONF	PF	PA	STK
Miami Dolphins	11	3	0	.786	6–2	9–2	327	216	W3
Buffalo Bills	9	5	0	.643	5–3	7–4	264	244	L2
New York Jets	7	7	0	.500	4–4	5–6	279	300	W6
New England Patriots	7	7	0	.500	4–4	4–7	348	289	L3
Baltimore Colts	2	12	0	.143	1–7	1–10	190	329	L4

== Season summary ==
=== Week 9 at Giants ===
Week Nine: New York Jets (1–7) at New York Giants (2–6)

Quarter	1	2	3	4	OT	Total
Jets	7	3	3	7	6	26
Giants	3	10	7	0	0	20

at Yale Bowl, New Haven, Connecticut

- Date: November 10, 1974
- Game time: 1:00 p.m. EST
- Game weather: 50 °F (10 °C)
- Game attendance: 64,327
- Box Score

Game information

First quarter

- NYJ – David Knight 19-yard pass from Joe Namath (Pat Leahy kick). Jets 7–0. Drive:
- NYG – Pete Gogolak 26-yard field goal. Jets 7–3. Drive:

Second quarter

- NYG – Bob Tucker 2-yard pass from Craig Morton (Pete Gogolak kick). Giants 10–7. Drive:
- NYJ – Pat Leahy 34-yard field goal. Tie 10–10. Drive:
- NYG – Pete Gogolak 22-yard field goal. Giants 13–10. Drive:

Third quarter

- NYJ – Pat Leahy 22-yard field goal. Tie 13–13. Drive:
- NYG – Bob Grim 12-yard pass from Craig Morton (Pete Gogolak kick). Giants 20–13. Drive:

Fourth quarter

- NYJ – Joe Namath 3-yard run (Pat Leahy kick). Tie 20–20. Drive:

Overtime

- NYJ – Emerson Boozer 5-yard pass from Joe Namath. Jets 26–20. Drive:

Top passers

- NYJ – Joe Namath – 20/31, 236 yards, 2 TD
- NYG – Craig Morton – 21/32, 237 yards, 2 TD

Top rushers

- NYJ – Robert Burns – 21 rushes, 101 yards
- NYG – Joe Dawkins – 11 rushes, 49 yards

Top receivers

- NYJ – Rich Caster – 3 receptions, 68 yards
- NYG – Walker Gillette – 5 receptions, 83 yards

== Awards and honors ==
- Joe Namath, NFL Comeback Player of the Year
