= 1975 New York Jets season =

1975 season of NFL team New York Jets

- Owner: Leon Hess
- Head coach: Charley Winner (2-7); Ken Shipp (1-4)
- Home stadium: Shea Stadium

Results
- Record: 3–11
- Division place: T-4th AFC East
- Playoffs: Did not qualify
- Pro Bowlers: RB John Riggins; TE Rich Caster

The 1975 New York Jets season was the 16th season for the team and the sixth in the National Football League. It began with the team trying to improve upon its 7–7 record from 1974 under head coach Charley Winner. The Jets failed to do so, and finished with a record of 3–11, the worst in franchise history at the time. Winner was fired after nine games and replaced with assistant Ken Shipp, who finished the season winning once in five games.

This would be the first of three consecutive 3–11 seasons, as they would repeat this win–loss record in 1976 and 1977. They tied the New England Patriots for last place in their division, the AFC East, but were awarded fourth place by virtue of their head-to-head sweep over the Patriots during the season.

The Jets’ pass defense surrendered 8.12 yards-per-attempt (including quarterback sacks), the second-most in NFL history. (Note: The 1981 Colts are the only NFL team to surrender more yards per opposing pass attempt.)

One of the only bright spots was fullback John Riggins rushing for 1,000 yards in a season (1,005) becoming the first Jet runner to eclipse that mark. Riggins also broke the record for most yards rushing in a season by a New York Jet (breaking the previous record of 948 set by Matt Snell).

== Offseason ==
=== NFL draft ===
1975 New York Jets draft
Round	Pick	Player	Position	College	Notes
2	37	Anthony Davis	Running back	USC	
2	37	Richard Wood	Linebacker	USC	
5	118	Joe Wysock	Guard	Miami (FL)	
6	153	Tom Alward	Guard	Nebraska	
8	193	James Scott	Wide receiver	Trinity Valley C. C.	
9	224	Ed Taylor	Cornerback	Memphis State	
Made roster

== Roster ==
1975 New York Jets roster
Quarterbacks (QB): 11 J. J. Jones; 12 Joe Namath; Running backs (RB): 32 Emerson Boozer; 35 Steve Davis; 26 Carl Garrett; 36 Bob Gresham; 43 Jazz Jackson; 44 John Riggins; Wide receivers (WR): 83 Jerome Barkum; 7 Eddie Bell; 82 David Knight; 89 Lou Piccone; Tight ends (TE): 86 Willie Brister; 88 Rich Caster	Offensive linemen (OL): 67 Darrell Austin G/T; 79 Gordie Browne T; 65 Joe Fields C/G; 75 Winston Hill T; 50 Wayne Mulligan C; 77 Garry Puetz G; 66 Randy Rasmussen G; 72 Robert Woods T; Defensive linemen (DL): 77 Carl Barzilauskas DT; 76 Jim Bailey DE/DT; 85 Ed Galigher DT; 81 Richard Neal DE; 87 Billy Newsome DE; 70 Larry Woods DT	Linebackers (LB): 53 Ken Bernich OLB; 55 John Ebersole MLB; 57 Rich Lewis OLB; 52 Steve Reese MLB; 56 Godwin Turk OLB; 58 Richard Wood OLB; Defensive backs (DB): 29 Carl Capria FS; 23 Jerry Davis CB; 48 George Hoey CB; 22 Burgess Owens SS; 46 Rich Sowells CB; 38 Ed Taylor FS/SS; 47 Roscoe Word CB; Special teams (ST): 8 Greg Gantt P; 5 Pat Leahy K	Reserve: 62 Al Atkinson LB (IR); 33 Bob Burns RB (IR); 20 Delles Howell S (IR); 84 Mark Lomas DE (IR); 54 Jamie Rivers LB (IR); 80 James Scott WR (IR); 21 Steve Tannen CB/S (IR); 27 Phil Wise S (IR); 18 Al Woodall QB (IR); 64 Joe Wysock G (IR); Rookies in italics

== Schedule ==
Week	Date	Opponent	Result	Record	Game site	Attendance
1	September 21	at **Buffalo Bills**	**L** 42–14	0–1	Rich Stadium	77,837
2	September 28	at Kansas City Chiefs	**W** 30–24	1–1	Arrowhead Stadium	73,939
3	October 5	**New England Patriots**	**W** 36–7	2–1	Shea Stadium	57,365
4	October 12	at Minnesota Vikings	**L** 29–21	2–2	Metropolitan Stadium	47,739
5	October 19	**Miami Dolphins**	**L** 43–0	2–3	Shea Stadium	47,191
6	October 26	**Baltimore Colts**	**L** 45–28	2–4	Shea Stadium	55,137
7	November 2	**Buffalo Bills**	**L** 24–23	2–5	Shea Stadium	58,343
8	November 9	at **Miami Dolphins**	**L** 27–7	2–6	Miami Orange Bowl	72,896
9	November 16	at **Baltimore Colts**	**L** 52–19	2–7	Memorial Stadium	52,097
10	November 23	St. Louis Cardinals	**L** 37–6	2–8	Shea Stadium	53,169
11	November 30	Pittsburgh Steelers	**L** 20–7	2–9	Shea Stadium	52,618
12	December 7	at **New England Patriots**	**W** 30–28	3–9	Schaefer Stadium	53,989
13	December 15	at San Diego Chargers	**L** 24–16	3–10	San Diego Stadium	49,706
14	December 21	Dallas Cowboys	**L** 31–21	3–11	Shea Stadium	37,279
Note: Intra-division opponents are in **bold** text.

=== Standings ===
AFC East
	W	L	T	PCT	DIV	CONF	PF	PA	STK
^{(3)} Baltimore Colts	10	4	0	.714	6–2	8–3	395	269	W9
Miami Dolphins	10	4	0	.714	6–2	7–4	357	222	W1
Buffalo Bills	8	6	0	.571	5–3	7–4	420	355	L1
New York Jets	3	11	0	.214	2–6	3–8	258	433	L2
New England Patriots	3	11	0	.214	1–7	2–9	258	358	L6
