= 1970 St. Louis Cardinals (NFL) season =

American football team season

1970 St. Louis Cardinals season
- Head coach: Charley Winner
- Home stadium: Busch Memorial Stadium

Results
- Record: 8–5–1
- Division place: 3rd NFC East
- Playoffs: Did not qualify
- Pro Bowlers: T Ernie McMillan; TE Jackie Smith; RB MacArthur Lane; LB Larry Stallings; CB Roger Wehrli; FS Larry Wilson

The 1970 St. Louis Cardinals season was the 51st season the team was in the league. The team improved on their previous output of 4–9–1, winning eight games. Despite them shutting out three consecutive opponents (and holding a fourth, the defending Super Bowl champion Kansas City Chiefs, without a touchdown in a 6–6 draw), they failed to reach the playoffs for the 22nd straight season, thanks to three consecutive losses in December. The Cardinals entered their regular season finale at Washington needing to defeat the Redskins, plus for losses by the Cowboys (to the Oilers) and the Giants (to the Rams), to reach the playoffs. It all became academic after the Cardinals lost 28-27 to the Redskins and the Cowboys mauled the Oilers 52–10 to win the NFC East.

Prior to the season-ending skid, the Cardinals swept the Dallas Cowboys, with the second victory a 38–0 destruction on Monday Night Football at the Cotton Bowl. Dallas did not lose again until it fell to the Baltimore Colts in Super Bowl V. The Cardinals swept the Cowboys only one other time, in 1989, (one year after the Cardinals' relocation to Arizona), when Dallas went 1-15 under first-year coach Jimmy Johnson. (The Cardinals and Cowboys have not been division rivals since 2001, as the now-Arizona Cardinals were moved to the NFC West in 2002.)

== Offseason ==
=== NFL draft ===
1970 St. Louis Cardinals draft
Round	Pick	Player	Position	College	Notes
1	8	Larry Stegent	Running back	Texas A&M	
2	33	Jim Corrigall	Linebacker	Kent State	
2	38	Chuck Hutchison	Guard	Ohio State	from N. Y. Giants
3	58	Charlie Pittman	Running back	Penn State	
3	69	Eric Harris	Defensive back	Colorado	from Washington
4	86	Greg Lens	Defensive tackle	Trinity (TX)	
4	91	Don Parish	Linebacker	Stanford	
5	111	Tom Lloyd	Tackle	Bowling Green	
5	127	Barry Pierson	Defensive back	Michigan	
6	136	James Manuel	Tackle	Toledo	
7	164	Jim McFarland	Tight end	Nebraska	
8	189	Tom Banks *	Center	Auburn	
8	201	Mike Holmgren	Quarterback	USC	
9	214	Paul White	Running back	UTEP	
10	242	Tony Plummer	Safety	Pacific	
11	267	Mike Siwek	Defensive tackle	Western Michigan	
Made roster * Made at least one Pro Bowl during career

=== Undrafted free agents ===
1970 undrafted free agents of note
Player	Position	College
Charlie Hayes	Tackle	Weber State
Dave Schneider	Guard	Houston

== Personnel ==
=== Staff / Coaches ===
1970 St. Louis Cardinals staff
Front office: Principal Owner/de facto General Manager - Bill Bidwill; Partial Owner / Team President - Charles Bidwill Jr.; Head coaches: Head Coach – Charley Winner; Offensive coaches: Offensive Backfield - Leeman Bennett; Offensive line – Red Miller; Receivers Coach / Game Scouting – Ken Shipp	Defensive coaches: Defensive Coordinator - Chuck Drulis; Linebackers Coach – Ken Blue; Defensive Line – Dick Voris; Defensive Backs - Chuck Drulis

=== Roster ===
1970 St. Louis Cardinals roster
Quarterbacks: 10 Pete Beathard; 17 Jim Hart; 18 David Olivo ×; Running backs: 39 Cid Edwards; 36 MacArthur Lane; 28 Charlie Pittman; 23 Johnny Roland; 27 Roy Shivers; 30 Paul White; Wide receivers: 31 Jerry Daanen; 44 John Gilliam; 88 Fred Hyatt; 80 Dave Williams; Tight ends: 89 Robert Brown; 83 Jim McFarland; 81 Jackie Smith	Offensive linemen: 54 Tom Banks C ×; 76 Vern Emerson T; 55 Irv Goode G; 65 Chuck Hutchison G; 66 Mike LaHood G; 73 Ernie McMillan T; 50 Wayne Mulligan C; 74 Bob Reynolds T; 63 Clyde Williams G; Defensive linemen: 74 Fred Heron DT; 70 Rolf Krueger DE; 75 Bob Rowe DT; 82 Joe Schmiesing DE/DT; 68 Mike Siwek DT; 87 Cal Snowden DE; 79 Chuck Walker DE	Linebackers: 56 Chip Healy OLB; 51 Dave Olerich MLB; 57 Don Parish OLB; 53 Jamie Rivers MLB; 34 Rocky Rosema OLB; 67 Larry Stallings OLB; Defensive backs: 24 Terry Brown FS; 20 Miller Farr CB; 43 Tony Plummer CB; 21 Jerry Stovall SS; 22 Roger Wehrli CB; 8 Larry Wilson FS; 41 Nate Wright CB; Special teams: 25 Jim Bakken K; 26 Chuck Latourette P/SS	Reserve lists: 45 Eric Harris CB (IR); 35 Larry Stegent RB (IR); ×Taxi Squad only rookies in italics

== Schedule ==
Week	Date	Opponent	Result	Record	Venue	Attendance
1	September 18	at Los Angeles Rams	**L** 13–34	0–1	Los Angeles Memorial Coliseum	63,130
2	September 27	**Washington Redskins**	**W** 27–17	1–1	Busch Memorial Stadium	44,246
3	October 4	**Dallas Cowboys**	**W** 20–7	2–1	Busch Memorial Stadium	50,780
4	October 11	New Orleans Saints	**W** 24–17	3–1	Busch Memorial Stadium	45,294
5	October 18	at **Philadelphia Eagles**	**W** 35–20	4–1	Franklin Field	59,002
6	October 25	at **New York Giants**	**L** 17–35	4–2	Yankee Stadium	62,984
7	November 1	Houston Oilers	**W** 44–0	5–2	Busch Memorial Stadium	47,911
8	November 8	Boston Patriots	**W** 31–0	6–2	Busch Memorial Stadium	46,446
9	November 16	at **Dallas Cowboys**	**W** 38–0	7–2	Cotton Bowl	69,323
10	November 22	at Kansas City Chiefs	**T** 6–6	7–2–1	Municipal Stadium	50,711
11	November 29	**Philadelphia Eagles**	**W** 23–14	8–2–1	Busch Memorial Stadium	46,581
12	December 6	at Detroit Lions	**L** 3–16	8–3–1	Tiger Stadium	56,362
13	December 13	**New York Giants**	**L** 17–34	8–4–1	Busch Memorial Stadium	50,845
14	December 20	at **Washington Redskins**	**L** 27–28	8–5–1	RFK Stadium	50,415
Note: Intra-division opponents are in **bold** text.

=== Standings ===
NFC East
	W	L	T	PCT	DIV	CONF	PF	PA	STK
Dallas Cowboys	10	4	0	.714	5–3	7–4	299	221	W5
New York Giants	9	5	0	.643	6–2	6–5	301	270	L1
St. Louis Cardinals	8	5	1	.615	5–3	6–5	325	228	L3
Washington Redskins	6	8	0	.429	3–5	4–7	297	314	W2
Philadelphia Eagles	3	10	1	.231	1–7	1–9–1	241	332	W1

Note: Tie games were not officially counted in the standings until 1972.
