= List of New York Jets head coaches =

There have been 22 head coaches in the history of the New York Jets football franchise. The team began as the New York Titans in the American Football League in 1960, but was renamed the New York Jets three years later. The Jets remained in the American Football League until the merger with the National Football League prior to the 1970 season. The current head coach of the Jets is Aaron Glenn, who was hired on January 22, 2025.

Sammy Baugh became the first head coach of the New York Titans in 1960, serving for two seasons before team owner Harry Wismer replaced him with Clyde "Bulldog" Turner. In terms of tenure, Weeb Ewbank has coached more games (158) and more complete seasons (11) than any other head coach in franchise history. He led the Jets to the AFL championship in 1968 and the AFL–NFL championship in Super Bowl III. Walt Michaels led the team to the AFC championship game in 1982; he was also honored as the Pro Football Weekly NFL Coach of the Year and UPI AFC Coach of the Year in 1978. Coaches Baugh, Turner and Ewbank are all members of the Pro Football Hall of Fame; Baugh and Turner were inducted as players, while Ewbank was inducted as a coach/administrator.

Three times in Jets history, the team has had an "interim" head coach. In 1975, Charley Winner was fired as head coach after leading the Jets to a 2–7 record. The team offensive coordinator Ken Shipp was named the interim coach for the remainder of the season, during which he won only one of five games. Shipp was succeeded by Lou Holtz for the 1976 season. Holtz resigned as Jets head coach with one game left in the 1976 season; Mike Holovak was named interim coach for the season finale against the Cincinnati Bengals. In 2024, Robert Saleh was fired five games into the season, upon which defensive coordinator Jeff Ulbrich took over as interim head coach.

Bill Belichick was twice named head coach of the Jets but never coached a single game or practice in that capacity. In 1997, he was named head coach for six days before the deal to allow Bill Parcells to leave the New England Patriots for the Jets was brokered, and Belichick became defensive coordinator; then, when Parcells stepped down after the 1999 season Belichick was named to replace him, but resigned the next day.

Herman Edwards is the only Jets head coach to lead the team to the playoffs more than twice; Rex Ryan is the only one with more than two postseason wins. Todd Bowles and Robert Saleh are the only ones to coach the Jets for more than two seasons without making the playoffs.

Two Jets head coaches have played for the Jets; Walt Michaels, who as a defensive assistant coach had to suit up and play in the 1963 season opener due to injuries, and Aaron Glenn, a 1994 first-round draft pick who played cornerback for the team from 1994 to 2001.

== Key ==
#	Number of coaches (Note: A running total of the number of Jets head coaches. Thus, any head coach who has two or more terms is only counted once.)
GC	Games coached
W	Wins
L	Losses
T	Ties
Win%	Winning percentage
†	Elected into the Pro Football Hall of Fame as a coach
‡	Elected into the Pro Football Hall of Fame as a player
*	Spent entire NFL head coaching career with the Jets

== Coaches ==
#	Image	Name	Term (Note: Each year is linked to an article about that particular NFL season.)			Regular season					Playoffs				Accomplishments	Ref.
#	Image	Name	Yrs	First	Last	GC	W	L	T	W%	GC	W	L	W%	Accomplishments	Ref.
New York Titans
1		Sammy Baugh‡	2	1960	1961	28	14	14	0	.500	—					
2		Bulldog Turner*‡	1	1962		14	5	9	0	.357	—					
New York Jets
3		Weeb Ewbank†	11	1963	1973	154	71	77	6	.481	3	2	1	.667	1 Super Bowl Championship (III); 1 AFL Championship (1968); 2 AFL playoff berths	
4		Charley Winner	2	1974	1975	23	9	14	0	.391	—					
5		Ken Shipp*	1	1975*^{[b]}		5	1	4	0	.200	—					
6		Lou Holtz*	1	1976*^{[c]}		13	3	10	0	.231	—					
7		Mike Holovak	1	1976^{[d]}		1	0	1	0	.000	—					
8		Walt Michaels*	6	1977	1982	87	39	47	1	.454	4	2	2	.500	2 Playoff berths Pro Football Weekly NFL Coach of the Year (1978); UPI NFL Coach of the Year (1978)	
9		Joe Walton*	7	1983	1989	111	53	57	1	.482	3	1	2	.333	2 Playoff berths	
10		Bruce Coslet	4	1990	1993	64	26	38	0	.406	1	0	1	.000	1 Playoff berth	
11		Pete Carroll	1	1994		16	6	10	0	.375	—					
12		Rich Kotite	2	1995	1996	32	4	28	0	.125	—					
13		Bill Parcells†	3	1997	1999	48	29	19	0	.604	2	1	1	.500	1 AFC East Championship (1998); 1 Playoff berth	
14		Al Groh*	1	2000		16	9	7	0	.563	—					
15		Herm Edwards	5	2001	2005	80	39	41	0	.488	5	2	3	.400	1 AFC East Championship (2002); 3 Playoff berths	
16		Eric Mangini	3	2006	2008	48	23	25	0	.479	1	0	1	.000	1 Playoff berth	
17		Rex Ryan	6	2009	2014	96	46	50	0	.479	6	4	2	.667	2 Playoff berths	
18		Todd Bowles	4	2015	2018	64	24	40	0	.375	—					
19		Adam Gase	2	2019	2020	32	9	23	0	.281	—					
20		Robert Saleh	4	2021	2024^{[e]}	56	20	36	0	.357	—					
21		Jeff Ulbrich*	1	2024^{[f]}		12	3	9	0	.250	—					
22		Aaron Glenn*	1	2025	present	17	3	14	0	.176	—					
Totals			67	1960	2025	1,017	436	573	8	.433	25	12	13	.480		

== Footnotes ==
- ^{a} The Win–loss percentage is calculated using the formula: $\frac{Wins+\frac{1}{2}Ties}{Games}$
- ^{b} Ken Shipp was the interim head coach for five games in the 1975 season.
- ^{c} Holtz resigned as Jets head coach 13 games into the season; he was replaced by Mike Holovak for the last game of the season.
- ^{d} Holovak coached the last game of the 1976 season, after Lou Holtz had resigned as Jets head coach.
- ^{e} Saleh was fired 5 games into the 2024 season, replaced by interim coach Jeff Ulbrich.
- ^{f} Ulbrich coached the final 12 games of the 2024 season after Robert Saleh was fired.
