= 1975 Buffalo Bills season =

16th season in franchise history

- Owner: Ralph Wilson
- Head coach: Lou Saban
- Home stadium: Rich Stadium

Results
- Record: 8–6
- Division place: 3rd AFC East
- Playoffs: Did not qualify
- Pro Bowlers: RB O.J. Simpson; G Joe DeLamielleure

The 1975 Buffalo Bills season was the franchise's sixth season in the NFL, and its 16th overall. The Bills earned their third consecutive winning season, but failed to improve on their 9–5 record and playoff appearance from last year and finished 8–6 and out of the playoffs.

== Season summary ==
The Bills led the league in points scored, with 420 (30.0 per game). This amount is the most points scored by any team in a 14-game season after the merger, and the most points scored by any team in the 1970s. The Bills were the only team in NFL history to average at least 30 points per game and miss the playoffs, until being joined by the Kansas City Chiefs in 2004.

Buffalo won their first four games by an average of 17 points. They were 5–2 at the halfway point of the season, and one game behind the 6–1 Miami Dolphins in the AFC East. Buffalo then lost four of their final seven games, ultimately falling two games short of the division title.

Bills' running back O. J. Simpson rushed for 1817 yards on the season, and set a then-record with 23 touchdowns scored for the season. Fullback Jim Braxton had 823 yards rushing. Buffalo's ground game dominated the league, with a total of 2974 rushing yards, over 300 yards more than the second best rushing total.

The 1975 Bills have the distinction of giving up the most total passing yards (3,080) in a 14-game schedule during the merger era. However, the Bills' 45 takeaways on defense led the league in 1975. Defensive back Robert James and safety Doug Jones were lost to the season with knee injuries.

== Offseason ==
=== NFL draft ===
Buffalo's defense gave up the fourth-most yards in the NFL in 1974, and so the Bills' first two picks in the 1975 draft were a pair of Nebraska linebackers – Tom Ruud and Bob Nelson—both of whom played for Buffalo for three seasons. N.C. State running back Roland Hooks played in every Bills game from 1976–1981. He is best known for his "Hail Mary" reception against New England in Week Twelve of the 1981 season, a catch which was instrumental in putting Buffalo into the postseason that year.

1975 Buffalo Bills draft
Round	Pick	Player	Position	College	Notes
1	19	Tom Ruud	Linebacker	Nebraska	
2	42	Bob Nelson	Linebacker	Nebraska	
2	50	Glenn Loft	Defensive back	Drake	
4	102	Tom Donchez	Running back	Penn State	
5	115	John McCrumbly	Linebacker	Texas A&M	
7	166	Gil Chapman	Running back	Michigan	
7	174	Reggie Cherry	Running back	Houston	
7	175	Harry Banks	Defensive back	Michigan	
8	201	John Hill	Defensive tackle	Duke	
10	253	Roland Hooks	Running back	NC State	
11	279	Tom Drake	Defensive back	Michigan	
12	305	Mark Johnson	Defensive end	Missouri	
13	331	Mark Dienhart	Offensive tackle	St. Thomas (MN)	
14	357	Robert Evans	Wide receiver	Morris Brown	
15	383	Chris Kupec	Quarterback	North Carolina	
16	408	Tom Fine	Tight end	Notre Dame	
17	435	Jeff Turcotte	Defensive end	Colorado	
Made roster

== Personnel ==
=== Staff/coaches ===
1975 Buffalo Bills staff
Front office: Majority Owner / Team President – Ralph Wilson; Vice President & General Manager – Bob Lustig; Vice president / Minority Owner – Pat McGroder; L. Budd Thalman - Vice President / Public Relations; Harvey Johnson - Director of Player Personnel; Elbert Dubenion - Talent Scout; Jim Cipriano - Ticket Director; Head coaches: Head coach – Lou Saban; Offensive coaches: Receivers – Bob Shaw; Offensive line – Jim Ringo	Defensive coaches: Defensive line – Stan Jones; Linebackers – John Ray; Defensive backfield – Bill Atkins; Special teams coaches: Ed Cavanaugh - Special teams; Strength and conditioning: Eddie Abramoski - Trainer; Bob Reese - Trainer; Tony Marchitte - Equipment Manager

=== Final roster ===
1975 Buffalo Bills roster
Quarterbacks (QB): 12 Joe Ferguson; 17 Gary Marangi; Running backs (RB): 34 Jim Braxton; 21 Gary Hayman; 23 Steven Schnarr; 32 O. J. Simpson; Wide receivers (WR): 81 Bob Chandler; 40 J. D. Hill; 80 John Holland; Tight ends (TE): 88 Reuben Gant; 87 Paul Seymour	Offensive linemen (OL): 60 Bill Adams G; 68 Joe DeLamielleure G; 70 Dave Foley T; 74 Donnie Green T; 76 Halvor Hagen T; 67 Reggie McKenzie G; 53 Mike Montler C; 61 Willie Parker C; Defensive linemen (DL): 72 Don Croft DT; 74 Earl Edwards DT; 71 Mike Kadish DT; 85 Walt Patulski DE; 65 Pat Toomay DE; 75 Jeff Winans DE; 62 Jeff Yeates DT	Linebackers (LB): 59 Doug Allen OLB; 30 Bo Cornell OLB; 50 Mark Johnson OLB; 52 Merv Krakau MLB; 57 John McCrumbly MLB; 54 Tom Ruud MLB; 55 John Skorupan OLB; Defensive backs (DB): 22 Steve Freeman FS; 43 Tony Greene CB; 28 Dwight Harrison CB; 26 Ed Jones SS; 41 Royce McKinney SS; 42 Frank Oliver CB; 37 Ike Thomas FS; 33 Vic Washington FS; Special teams (ST): 7 Marv Bateman P; 3 John Leypoldt K	Reserve: -- Harry Banks CB (IR); 25 Roland Hooks RB (IR); 20 Robert James CB (IR); 24 Doug Jones S (IR); 56 Bob Nelson LB (IR); 27 Ahmad Rashad WR (IR); Rookies in italics

== Regular season ==
=== Schedule ===
Week	Date	Opponent	Result	Record	Venue	Attendance
1	September 21	**New York Jets**	**W** 42–14	1–0	Rich Stadium	77,837
2	September 28	at Pittsburgh Steelers	**W** 30–21	2–0	Three Rivers Stadium	49,348
3	October 5	Denver Broncos	**W** 38–14	3–0	Rich Stadium	79,864
4	October 12	at **Baltimore Colts**	**W** 38–31	4–0	Memorial Stadium	43,907
5	October 20	New York Giants	**L** 14–17	4–1	Rich Stadium	79,428
6	October 26	**Miami Dolphins**	**L** 30–35	4–2	Rich Stadium	79,141
7	November 2	at **New York Jets**	**W** 24–23	5–2	Shea Stadium	58,343
8	November 9	**Baltimore Colts**	**L** 35–42	5–3	Rich Stadium	77,320
9	November 17	at Cincinnati Bengals	**L** 24–33	5–4	Riverfront Stadium	56,666
10	November 23	**New England Patriots**	**W** 45–31	6–4	Rich Stadium	65,655
11	November 27	at St. Louis Cardinals	**W** 32–14	7–4	Busch Memorial Stadium	41,899
12	December 7	at **Miami Dolphins**	**L** 21–31	7–5	Miami Orange Bowl	78,701
13	December 14	at **New England Patriots**	**W** 34–14	8–5	Schaefer Stadium	58,393
14	December 20	Minnesota Vikings	**L** 13–35	8–6	Rich Stadium	54,993
Note: Intra-division opponents are in **bold** text.

=== Season summary ===
==== Week 1 vs Jets ====
Quarter	1	2	3	4	Total
Jets	7	7	0	0	**14**
**Bills**	14	7	14	7	**42**

at Rich Stadium, Orchard Park, New York

- Date: September 21
- Game time: 1:00 p.m.
- Game weather: 56 °F (13 °C), wind 13 mph (21 km/h)
- Pro-Football-Reference.com

Game information

**First quarter**

- Bills – O. J. Simpson 2 yard run (John Leypoldt kick) – **Bills 7–0**
- Bills – Jim Braxton 3 yard pass from Joe Ferguson (John Leypoldt kick) – **Bills 14–0**
- Jets – Rich Caster 28 yard pass from Joe Namath (Pat Leahy kick) – **Bills 14–7**

**Second quarter**

- Bills – O. J. Simpson 5 yard run (John Leypoldt kick) – **Bills 21–7**
- Jets – Eddie Bell 12 yard pass from Joe Namath (Pat Leahy kick) – **Bills 21–14**

**Third quarter**

- Bills – Paul Seymour 2 yard pass from Joe Ferguson (John Leypoldt kick) – **Bills 28–14**
- Bills – Joe Ferguson 1 yard run (John Leypoldt kick) – **Bills 35–14**

**Fourth quarter**

- Bills – Pat Toomay 44 yard interception return (John Leypoldt kick) – **Bills 42–14**

**Jets**

- Joe Namath
  14/36, 173 Yds, 2 TD, 4 INT
- John Riggins
  10 Rush, 61 Yds
- Rich Caster
  6 Rec, 103 Yds, TD

**Bills**

- Joe Ferguson
  7/13, 67 Yds, 2 TD
- O. J. Simpson
  32 Rush, 173 Yds, 3 TD
- Bob Chandler
  3 Rec, 34 Yds

==== Week 2 at Steelers ====
	1	2	3	4	Total
Bills (1-0)	0	10	13	7	**30**
Steelers (1-0)	0	0	7	14	**21**

==== Week 3 vs Broncos ====
Team	1	2	3	4	Total
Broncos	0	7	7	0	14
• Bills	10	14	14	0	38

- Date: October 5
- Location: Rich Stadium
- Game start: 1:00 p.m. EST
- Game weather: 58 °F (14 °C), wind 11 mph (18 km/h)

Scoring summary
1	BUF	John Leypoldt 39 yard field goal	Bills 3–0
1	BUF	Jim Braxton 3 yard run (John Leypoldt kick)	Bills 10–0
2	BUF	Jim Braxton 19 yard pass from Joe Ferguson (John Leypoldt kick)	Bills 17–0
2	DEN	Floyd Little 35 yard pass from Charley Johnson (Jim Turner kick)	Bills 17–7
2	BUF	J. D. Hill 16 yard pass from Joe Ferguson (John Leypoldt kick)	Bills 24–7
3	BUF	O. J. Simpson 16 yard run (John Leypoldt kick)	Bills 31–7
3	BUF	Jim Braxton 4 yard run (John Leypoldt kick)	Bills 38–7
3	DEN	Rick Upchurch 80 yard pass from John Hufnagel (Jim Turner kick)	Bills 38–14

==== Week 4 at Colts ====
	1	2	3	4	Total
Bills (3-0)	10	14	7	7	**38**
Colts (1-2)	14	7	7	3	**31**

==== Week 5 vs Giants ====
Team	1	2	3	4	Total
• Giants	0	7	0	10	17
Bills	7	7	0	0	14

- Date: October 20
- Location: Rich Stadium, Orchard Park, New York
- Game start: 9:00 p.m. EST
- Game weather: 50 °F (10 °C) • 13 miles per hour (21 km/h; 11 kn)
- **TV announcers (**ABC Monday Night Football): Frank Gifford, Howard Cosell, and Alex Karras

==== Week 6 vs Dolphins ====
	1	2	3	4	Total
Dolphins (4-1)	0	14	7	14	**35**
Bills (4-1)	13	10	0	7	**30**

==== Week 7 at Jets ====
	1	2	3	4	Total
Bills (4-2)	7	0	10	7	**24**
Jets (2-4)	3	13	7	0	**23**

==== Week 8 vs Colts ====
	1	2	3	4	Total
Colts (3-4)	0	21	0	21	**42**
Bills (5–2)	7	21	0	7	**35**

==== Week 9 at Bengals ====
	1	2	3	4	Total
Bills (5-3)	3	7	7	7	**24**
Bengals (7-1)	6	14	3	10	**33**

MNF

==== Week 10 vs Patriots ====
	1	2	3	4	Total
Patriots (3-6)	7	14	7	3	**31**
Bills (5-4)	14	10	7	14	**45**

==== Week 11 at Cardinals ====
	1	2	3	4	Total
Bills (6-4)	6	7	6	13	**32**
Cardinals (8-2)	7	0	0	7	**14**

Thursday game

==== Week 12 at Dolphins ====
	1	2	3	4	Total
Bills (7-4)	0	0	14	7	**21**
Dolphins (8-3)	7	14	3	7	**31**

==== Week 13 at Patriots ====
	1	2	3	4	Total
Bills (7-5)	6	7	14	7	**34**
Patriots (3-9)	0	7	0	7	**14**

==== Week 14 vs Vikings ====
	1	2	3	4	Total
Vikings (11-2)	14	7	14	0	**35**
Bills (8-5)	0	7	6	0	**13**

Saturday game

- Snow

=== Standings ===
AFC East
	W	L	T	PCT	DIV	CONF	PF	PA	STK
^{(3)} Baltimore Colts	10	4	0	.714	6–2	8–3	395	269	W9
Miami Dolphins	10	4	0	.714	6–2	7–4	357	222	W1
Buffalo Bills	8	6	0	.571	5–3	7–4	420	355	L1
New York Jets	3	11	0	.214	2–6	3–8	258	433	L2
New England Patriots	3	11	0	.214	1–7	2–9	258	358	L6

== Awards and honors ==
=== All-Pros ===
First Team

- Joe DeLamielleure, Guard
- O. J. Simpson, Running back

Second Team

- Reggie McKenzie, Guard

== See also ==
- Electric Company
