= 1968 St. Louis Cardinals (NFL) season =

American football team season

1968 St. Louis Cardinals season
- Head coach: Charley Winner
- Home stadium: Busch Memorial Stadium

Results
- Record: 9–4–1
- Division place: 2nd Century
- Playoffs: Did not qualify

The 1968 St. Louis Cardinals season was the 49th season the team was in the National Football League (NFL). The team improved on their previous output of 6–7–1, winning nine games. Despite the improvement, they failed to qualify for the playoffs for the 20th consecutive season.

== Offseason ==
=== NFL draft ===
1968 St. Louis Cardinals draft
Round	Pick	Player	Position	College	Notes
1	13	MacArthur Lane *	Running Back	Utah State	
2	40	Fred Hyatt	Wide receiver	Auburn	
2	42	Bob Atkins	Defensive Back	Grambling	
4	87	Don Fitzgerald	Running Back	Kent State	
4	96	Joe Schmiesing	Defensive end	New Mexico State	
5	123	Rocky Rosema	Linebacker	Michigan	
Made roster * Made at least one Pro Bowl during career

== Personnel ==
=== Staff / Coaches ===
1968 St. Louis Cardinals staff
Front office: Principal Owner/de facto General Manager - Bill Bidwill; Partial Owner / Team President - Charles Bidwill Jr.; Head coaches: Head Coach – Charley Winner; Offensive coaches: Quarterbacks / Passing Offense - Harry Gilmer; Offensive Backs - Red Cochran; Offensive line / Rushing Offense – Red Miller; Receivers Coach / Game Scouting – Ken Shipp	Defensive coaches: Defensive Coordinator - Chuck Drulis; Linebackers Coach – Don Shroyer; Defensive Line – Dick Voris; Defensive Backs - Chuck Drulis

=== Roster ===
1968 St. Louis Cardinals roster
Quarterbacks: 17 Jim Hart; 12 Charley Johnson; Running backs: 33 Willis Crenshaw; 39 Cid Edwards; 36 MacArthur Lane; 23 Johnny Roland; 27 Roy Shivers; Wide receivers: 40 Bobby Joe Conrad; 31 Jerry Daanen; 88 Fred Hyatt; 47 Bobby Lee; 80 Dave Williams; Tight ends: 83 Chuck Logan; 81 Jackie Smith	Offensive linemen: 61 Bob DeMarco C; 69 Bobby Duncum T; 76 Vern Emerson T ×; 55 Irv Goode G; 64 Ken Gray G; 51 Dick Kasperek C; 73 Ernie McMillan T; 74 Bob Reynolds T; 66 Rick Sortun G; 54 Ted Wheeler G; 63 Clyde Williams G/T; Defensive linemen: 83 Don Brumm DE; 72 Dan Goich DT ×; 74 Fred Heron DT; 89 Dave Long DE; 75 Bob Rowe DT; 82 Joe Schmiesing DE; 79 Chuck Walker DE/DT	Linebackers: 59 Ernie Clark OLB; 60 Dave Meggyesy OLB; 53 Jamie Rivers MLB; 34 Rocky Rosema OLB; 67 Larry Stallings OLB; 57 Mike Strofolino MLB; Defensive backs: 48 Bob Atkins CB; 20 Mike Barnes SS; 29 Brady Keys CB; 42 Lonnie Sanders CB; 43 Mack Sauls CB/S; 21 Jerry Stovall SS; 8 Larry Wilson FS; Special teams: 25 Jim Bakken K; 26 Chuck Latourette P/SS	Reserve lists: 32 Phil Rogers WR (Military); 16 Tim Van Galder QB (Military); ×Taxi Squad only rookies in italics

== Schedule ==
Week	Date	Opponent	Result	Record	Venue	Attendance
1	September 16	Los Angeles Rams	**L** 13–24	0–1	Busch Memorial Stadium	49,757
2	September 22	at San Francisco 49ers	**L** 17–35	0–2	Kezar Stadium	27,557
3	September 29	at **New Orleans Saints**	**W** 21–20	1–2	Tulane Stadium	79,021
4	October 6	Dallas Cowboys	**L** 10–27	1–3	Busch Memorial Stadium	48,296
5	October 13	at **Cleveland Browns**	**W** 27–21	2–3	Cleveland Municipal Stadium	79,349
6	October 20	Washington Redskins	**W** 41–14	3–3	Busch Memorial Stadium	46,456
7	October 27	**New Orleans Saints**	**W** 31–17	4–3	Busch Memorial Stadium	45,476
8	November 3	at Philadelphia Eagles	**W** 45–17	5–3	Franklin Field	59,208
9	November 10	**Pittsburgh Steelers**	**T** 28–28	5–3–1	Busch Memorial Stadium	45,432
10	November 17	at Baltimore Colts	**L** 0–27	5–4–1	Memorial Stadium	60,238
11	November 24	Atlanta Falcons	**W** 17–12	6–4–1	Busch Memorial Stadium	43,246
12	December 1	at **Pittsburgh Steelers**	**W** 20–10	7–4–1	Pitt Stadium	22,682
13	December 8	at New York Giants	**W** 28–21	8–4–1	Yankee Stadium	62,709
14	December 14	**Cleveland Browns**	**W** 27–16	9–4–1	Busch Memorial Stadium	39,746
Note: Intra-division opponents are in **bold** text.

== Standings ==
NFL Century
	W	L	T	PCT	DIV	CONF	PF	PA	STK
Cleveland Browns	10	4	0	.714	4–2	7–3	394	273	L1
St. Louis Cardinals	9	4	1	.692	5–0–1	8–1–1	325	289	W4
New Orleans Saints	4	9	1	.308	2–4	3–7	246	327	W1
Pittsburgh Steelers	2	11	1	.154	0–5–1	1–8–1	244	397	L5

Note: Tie games were not officially counted in the standings until 1972.
