= 1975 Baltimore Colts season =

23rd season in franchise history

- Owner: Robert Irsay
- General manager: Joe Thomas
- Head coach: Ted Marchibroda
- Home stadium: Memorial Stadium

Results
- Record: 10–4
- Division place: T-1st AFC East
- Playoffs: Lost Divisional Playoffs (at Steelers) 10–28
- Pro Bowlers: T George Kunz; RB Lydell Mitchell; DE John Dutton

The 1975 Baltimore Colts season was the 23rd season for the team in the National Football League. Under first-year head coach Ted Marchibroda, the Colts finished the 1975 season with 10 wins and 4 losses, and tied for first in the AFC East division with the Miami Dolphins; Baltimore won the division tiebreaker based on a head-to-head sweep of Miami — the first sweep of the Dolphins in their six years under head coach Don Shula.

The Colts won their opener, lost four straight, then swept their final nine games and narrowly edged the Dolphins for the division title. The turnaround season became forever known by Colts fans afterward as The Miracle on 33rd Street.

This was the first of three consecutive AFC East titles for the Colts. Hired in January, Marchibroda was previously the offensive coordinator for the Washington Redskins under head coach George Allen. The 1975 Colts coaching staff included 23-year-old assistant Bill Belichick, his first association with an NFL team and first coaching position.

== Offseason ==
=== Draft ===
1975 Baltimore Colts Draft
Round	Selection	Player	Position	College	Notes
1	3	Ken Huff	G	North Carolina	
3	53	Mike Washington	CB	Alabama	
3	56	Dave Pear	DT	Washington	
4	80	Marshall Johnson	WR	Houston	
4	93	Paul Linford	DT	BYU	
5	105	Roosevelt Leaks	RB	Texas	
6	131	Don Westbrook	WR	Nebraska	
7	157	Kim Jones	RB	Colorado State	
7	160	Steve Joachim	QB	Temple	
7	168	Derrel Luce	LB	Baylor	
8	184	John Bushong	DE	Western Kentucky	
8	187	Greg Denboer	TE	Michigan	
8	192	Mario Cage	RB	Northwestern Louisiana	
9	209	Royce McKinney	DB	Kentucky State	
10	236	Phil Waganheim	P	Maryland	
11	261	David Hazel	WR	Ohio State	
12	288	Brad Storm	LB	Iowa State	
13	313	John Roman	G	Idaho State	
14	340	Mike Smith	C	SMU	
15	365	John Goodie	RB	Langston	
16	392	Bill Malouf	QB	Ole Miss	
16	399	Mike Evavold	DT	MacAlester	
16	416	Robert Smith	DB	Maryland	
17	417	David McKnight	LB	Georgia	
17	426	Mike Bengard	DE	Northwestern (Iowa)	
17	440	Frank Russel	WR	Maryland	

== Personnel ==
=== Staff ===
1975 Baltimore Colts staff
Front office: President and treasurer – Robert Irsay; General manager – Joe Thomas; Assistant general manager – Ernie Accorsi; Coaching staff: Head coach – Ted Marchibroda; Staff assistant - Bill Belichick; Offensive coaches: Receivers – Pete McCulley; Offensive line – Whitey Dovell	Defensive coaches: Defensive coordinator – Maxie Baughan; Defensive line – Jerry Smith; Defensive backfield – Frank Lauterbur; Special teams coaches: Special teams – George Boutselis

=== Final roster ===
1975 Baltimore Colts roster
Quarterbacks (QB): 14 Marty Domres; 7 Bert Jones; Running backs (RB): 48 Roosevelt Leaks; 23 Don McCauley; 26 Lydell Mitchell; 38 Bill Olds; 27 Howard Stevens; Wide receivers (WR): 81 Roger Carr; 35 Glenn Doughty; 29 Marshall Johnson; 86 Freddie Scott; Tight ends (TE): 87 Raymond Chester; 85 Jimmie Kennedy	Offensive linemen (OL): 50 Forrest Blue C; 66 Elmer Collett G; 73 Ed George T; 62 Ken Huff G; 75 George Kunz T; 57 Ken Mendenhall C; 61 Robert Pratt G; 64 David Taylor T; 67 Bob Van Duyne G; Defensive linemen (DL): 63 Mike Barnes DT; 72 Fred Cook DE; 78 John Dutton DE; 76 Joe Ehrmann DT; 65 Dave Pear DT; 71 Glenn Robinson DE	Linebackers (LB): 59 Jim Cheyunski MLB; 55 Dan Dickel OLB; 58 Derrel Luce OLB; 52 Tom MacLeod OLB; 51 Mike Varty MLB; 53 Stan White OLB; Defensive backs (DB): 40 Bruce Laird SS; 42 Lloyd Mumphord CB; 31 Nelson Munsey CB; 30 Doug Nettles CB; 25 Ray Oldham CB/S; 21 Rick Volk FS; 20 Jackie Wallace FS; Special teams (ST): 49 David Lee P; 2 Toni Linhart K	Reserve: 32 Mike Curtis LB (IR); 33 Randy Hall S (IR); 46 Kim Jones RB (IR); 34 Mike Washington CB (IR); Rookies in italics

== Regular season ==
=== Schedule ===
Week	Date	Opponent	Result	Record	Venue	Attendance	Recap
1	September 21	at Chicago Bears	**W** 35–7	1–0	Soldier Field	54,152	Recap
2	September 28	Oakland Raiders	**L** 20–31	1–1	Memorial Stadium	40,657	Recap
3	October 5	at Los Angeles Rams	**L** 13–24	1–2	Los Angeles Memorial Coliseum	62,491	Recap
4	October 12	**Buffalo Bills**	**L** 31–38	1–3	Memorial Stadium	43,907	Recap
5	October 19	at **New England Patriots**	**L** 10–21	1–4	Schaefer Stadium	51,417	Recap
6	October 26	at **New York Jets**	**W** 45–28	2–4	Shea Stadium	55,137	Recap
7	November 2	Cleveland Browns	**W** 21–7	3–4	Memorial Stadium	35,235	Recap
8	November 9	at **Buffalo Bills**	**W** 42–35	4–4	Rich Stadium	77,320	Recap
9	November 16	**New York Jets**	**W** 52–19	5–4	Memorial Stadium	52,097	Recap
10	November 23	at **Miami Dolphins**	**W** 33–17	6–4	Orange Bowl	61,986	Recap
11	November 30	Kansas City Chiefs	**W** 28–14	7–4	Memorial Stadium	42,122	Recap
12	December 7	at New York Giants	**W** 21–0	8–4	Shea Stadium	49,863	Recap
13	December 14	**Miami Dolphins**	**W** 10–7^{OT}	9–4	Memorial Stadium	59,398	Recap
14	December 21	**New England Patriots**	**W** 34–21	10–4	Memorial Stadium	48,678	Recap
Note: Intra-division opponents are in **bold** text.

=== Standings ===
AFC East
	W	L	T	PCT	DIV	CONF	PF	PA	STK
^{(3)} Baltimore Colts	10	4	0	.714	6–2	8–3	395	269	W9
Miami Dolphins	10	4	0	.714	6–2	7–4	357	222	W1
Buffalo Bills	8	6	0	.571	5–3	7–4	420	355	L1
New York Jets	3	11	0	.214	2–6	3–8	258	433	L2
New England Patriots	3	11	0	.214	1–7	2–9	258	358	L6

== Playoffs ==
The team made it to the playoffs as a No. 3 seed and traveled to Pittsburgh to play the Steelers in the divisional round. Tied at seven at the half, Pittsburgh outscored the Colts 21–3 in the second half. The Steelers defense forced four turnovers and held the Colts to 154 total yards of offense in their 28–10 win.

Round	Date	Opponent (seed)	Result	Record	Venue	Recap
Divisional	December 27	at Pittsburgh Steelers (1)	L 10–28	Three Rivers Stadium	49,053	Recap

== Awards and honors ==
- Sporting News Executive of the Year: Joe Thomas
- AP Coach of the Year, PFW Coach of the Year, Sporting News Coach of the Year, UPI AFC Coach of the Year: Ted Marchibroda

== See also ==
- History of the Indianapolis Colts
- Indianapolis Colts seasons
- Colts–Patriots rivalry
