= Godwin Turk =

American football player (born 1950)

No. 56, 55
- Position: Linebacker

Personal information
- Born: October 15, 1950 (age 76); Houston, Texas, U.S.
- Listed height: 6 ft 3 in (1.91 m)
- Listed weight: 230 lb (104 kg)

Career information
- High school: Wheatley (Houston)
- College: Southern
- NFL draft: 1974: 3rd round, 58th overall pick

Career history
- New York Jets (1974–1975); Denver Broncos (1976–1978)

Awards and highlights
- First-team Little All-American (1973)

Career NFL statistics
- Interceptions: 4
- Interception yards: 56
- Fumble recoveries: 3
- Stats at Pro Football Reference

Godwin Lee Turk (born October 15, 1950) is an American former professional football player who was a linebacker in the National Football League (NFL). He played college football for the Southern Jaguars. Turk played in the NFL for the New York Jets (1974–1975) and the Denver Broncos (1976–1978).

== High school and college ==
Following graduation from Phillis Wheatley High School in Houston, Texas, Turk first enrolled at the University of California, Berkeley where he played on the football team. He then transferred to Southern University in Baton Rouge, Louisiana where he completed his college football eligibility.

== Professional career ==
=== New York Jets ===
Turk was selected as a linebacker by the New York Jets as the 58th overall pick, the sixth selection in the third round, in the 1974 NFL draft. He had surgery on August 14, 1974, to repair ligament damage to his left shoulder suffered during the 1974 pre-season. The extensive recovery period from the surgery prevented him from playing any regular season games during his rookie year (1974) with the Jets. Turk participated in all 14 games in the 1975 season for the Jets, recording two interceptions. He wore #56 while he was with the Jets and was listed as being 6'3" tall and weighing 230 lbs. Prior to the 1976 NFL season, Turk was traded to the Denver Broncos for pick 129, 17th pick in the 5th round, of the 1977 NFL draft. The player the Jets selected in 1977 with the 129th pick was Gary Gregory, an offensive tackle from Baylor University.

=== Denver Broncos ===
Turk played for the Denver Broncos from 1976 through 1978. He wore # 55. He was a linebacker who participated mostly on special teams. He was on the Bronco's active roster for 42 games and he was a starter for 5 of those games. He was on the Broncos 1977 American Football Conference Champion's roster when they played the Dallas Cowboys in Super Bowl XII. Turk is infamous for dislocating his own shoulder while over exuberantly spiking the ball in jubilation after recovering a turnover during a regular season home game in Denver.
