= Stingley =

Stingley is a surname. Notable people with the surname include:

- Darryl Stingley (1951–2007), American football player
- Derek Stingley Sr. (born 1971), American football player and coach
- Derek Stingley Jr. (born 2001), American football player
