= Steve Burks =

American football player (born 1953)

No. 82
- Position: Wide receiver

Personal information
- Born: August 6, 1953 (age 73); Little Rock, Arkansas, U.S.
- Listed height: 6 ft 5 in (1.96 m)
- Listed weight: 211 lb (96 kg)

Career information
- High school: Cabot (Cabot, Arkansas)
- College: Arkansas State (1971–1974)
- NFL draft: 1975: 4th round, 91st overall pick

Career history
- New England Patriots (1975–1977)

Career NFL statistics
- Receptions: 13
- Receiving yards: 264
- Receiving average: 20.3
- Rushing yards: 2
- Return yards: 65
- Stats at Pro Football Reference

Steven Bruce Burks (born August 6, 1953) is an American former professional football player who was a wide receiver in the National Football League (NFL) for the New England Patriots. He played college football for the Arkansas State Red Wolves.

== Early life ==
Burks was born on August 6, 1953, and grew up in Cabot, Arkansas. He was a multi-sport athlete while attending Cabot High School, where in his senior year, he won the state decathlon and was all-county in basketball. In addition, Burks was an all-state and all-star selection in football and basketball. He was selected with the 458th overall pick in the 19th round of the 1971 MLB draft by the New York Yankees.

== College career ==
Burks played college football for the Arkansas State Red Wolves from 1971 to 1974. He played as a quarterback and tied the team's single-game rushing touchdown record with seven in 1973 against Abilene Christian. In Burks's final year, he attempted 56 passes, completing 26 of them, for 264 yards, two touchdowns and two interceptions. He also added on 373 rushing yards, four rushing touchdowns and six receptions for 54 yards.

== Professional career ==
Burks was selected in the fourth round with the 91st overall pick in the 1975 NFL draft by the New England Patriots. In his rookie season, he played in 13 games, recording six catches for 158 yards and 65 kick return yards. In 1976, Burks caught two passes for 27 yards and rushed for two yards. In his final year, he registered five catches for 79 yards.

== Career statistics ==
=== NFL ===
==== Regular season ====
Legend
| **Bold** | Career high |

| Year | Team | Games | | Receiving | | | | | Rushing | | | | |
| Year | Team | GP | GS | Rec | Yds | Avg | Lng | TD | Att | Yds | Avg | Lng | TD |
|---|---|---|---|---|---|---|---|---|---|---|---|---|---|
| 1975 | NE | **13** | 0 | **6** | **158** | **26.3** | **76** | 0 | 0 | 0 | — | 0 | 0 |
| 1976 | NE | 8 | **1** | 2 | 27 | 13.5 | 17 | 0 | **1** | **2** | **2.0** | **2** | 0 |
| 1977 | NE | **13** | 0 | 5 | 79 | 15.8 | 22 | 0 | 0 | 0 | — | 0 | 0 |
| Career | | 34 | 1 | 13 | 264 | 20.3 | 76 | 0 | 1 | 2 | 2.0 | 2 | 0 |

==== Postseason ====
| Year | Team | Games | | Receiving | | | | | Rushing | | | | |
| Year | Team | GP | GS | Rec | Yds | Avg | Lng | TD | Att | Yds | Avg | Lng | TD |
|---|---|---|---|---|---|---|---|---|---|---|---|---|---|
| 1976 | NE | 1 | 0 | 0 | 0 | — | 0 | 0 | 0 | 0 | — | 0 | 0 |
| Career | | 1 | 0 | 0 | 0 | — | 0 | 0 | 0 | 0 | — | 0 | 0 |
