= List of Cal State Northridge Matadors in the NFL draft =

This is a list of Cal State Northridge Matadors football players in the NFL draft.

== Key ==
B	Back	K	Kicker	NT	Nose tackle
C	Center	LB	Linebacker	FB	Fullback
DB	Defensive back	P	Punter	HB	Halfback
DE	Defensive end	QB	Quarterback	WR	Wide receiver
DT	Defensive tackle	RB	Running back	G	Guard
E	End	T	Offensive tackle	TE	Tight end

== Draft picks ==
Year	Round	Pick	Overall	Player	Team	Position
1972	13	12	331	Leon Pettigrew	San Francisco 49ers	T
1972	13	25	333	Ted Covington	Oakland Raiders	WR
1973	6	15	145	Doug Jones	Kansas City Chiefs	DB
1976	5	21	136	Melvin Wilson	New York Giants	DB
1990	8	19	218	Barry Voorhees	New York Giants	T
