= Steven Schnarr =

American football player (born 1952)

No. 23
- Position: Running back

Personal information
- Born: July 30, 1952 (age 74); Philadelphia, Pennsylvania, U.S.
- Listed height: 6 ft 2 in (1.88 m)
- Listed weight: 216 lb (98 kg)

Career information
- High school: Grove City
- College: Otterbein
- NFL draft: 1975: undrafted

Career history
- Buffalo Bills (1975)
- Stats at Pro Football Reference

Steven Donald Schnarr (born July 30, 1952) is an American former professional football player who was a running back for the Buffalo Bills of the National Football League (NFL). He played college football for the Otterbein Cardinals.

Born in Philadelphia, Schnarr attended Grove City High School in Ohio and later played college football for the Otterbein Cardinals. At Otterbein, he was selected first-team All-Ohio Athletic Conference as a senior while being chosen Otterbein's most improved and best offensive player. He ran for 756 yards and 10 touchdowns while breaking school records for single-season rush attempts and yards in one game, also tying for most rushes in a game. He was invited to play in the All-Ohio Shrine Bowl.

Schnarr joined the Buffalo Bills as an undrafted free agent in 1975. He was the final roster cut but later re-joined the team as a special teams member. He played 12 games for the team and returned four kicks for 80 yards. He was released by the team prior to the 1976 season.
