= John McCrumbly =

American football player (1953–2025)

No. 57
- Position: Linebacker

Personal information
- Born: July 28, 1953; Dallas, Texas, U.S.
- Died: October 13, 2025 (aged 72); Mansfield, Texas, U.S.
- Listed height: 6 ft 1 in (1.85 m)
- Listed weight: 245 lb (111 kg)

Career information
- High school: Woodrow Wilson (Dallas)
- College: Texas A&M
- NFL draft: 1975: 5th round, 115th overall pick

Career history
- Buffalo Bills (1975)
- Stats at Pro Football Reference

John Paul McCrumbly (July 28, 1953 – October 13, 2025) was an American professional football player who was a linebacker for the Buffalo Bills of the National Football League (NFL). After playing college football at Tyler Junior College and Texas A&M University, McCrumbly played a season for the Bills in 1975.

== Early life ==
McCrumbly played linebacker and fullback at Woodrow Wilson High School in Dallas in the school's early days of racial integration. He made the varsity football team as a sophomore. He became the school's first black football star. When McCrumbly was a junior, he rushed for more than 1,900 yards and scored 19 touchdowns as Woodrow Wilson made it to the state semifinals. He was a consensus all-state selection in 1970.

McCrumbly subsequently played linebacker for Tyler Junior College, where he was a second-team National Junior College Athletic Association (NJCAA) All-American in 1971 and 1972. The 1972 Tyler Junior College team led the NJCAA in total defense. McCrumbly then played linebacker at Texas A&M University, where he played alongside Aggies linebackers Garth TenNapel and Ed Simonini.

== Career ==
After being drafted by the NFL's Buffalo Bills in the fifth round (115th selection overall) of the 1975 NFL draft, McCrumbly played 13 games for the Bills at linebacker that season, starting two games. McCrumbly moved into a weak group of linebackers with the Bills; he played next to Bo Cornell, who was changing positions from running back, and John Skorupan, an established linebacker who had been hurt in 1974. Buffalo released McCrumbly on waivers in August 1976 after not playing in the team's last two preseason games.

== Later life ==
After his season in the NFL, McCrumbly came back to Texas and began a long career in security with the Dallas Independent School District. As of 2011, he lived in the Dallas neighborhood where he grew up.

McCrumbly died at home in Mansfield, Texas, on October 13, 2025, at the age of 72.
