= Darryl Stingley =

American football player (1951–2007)

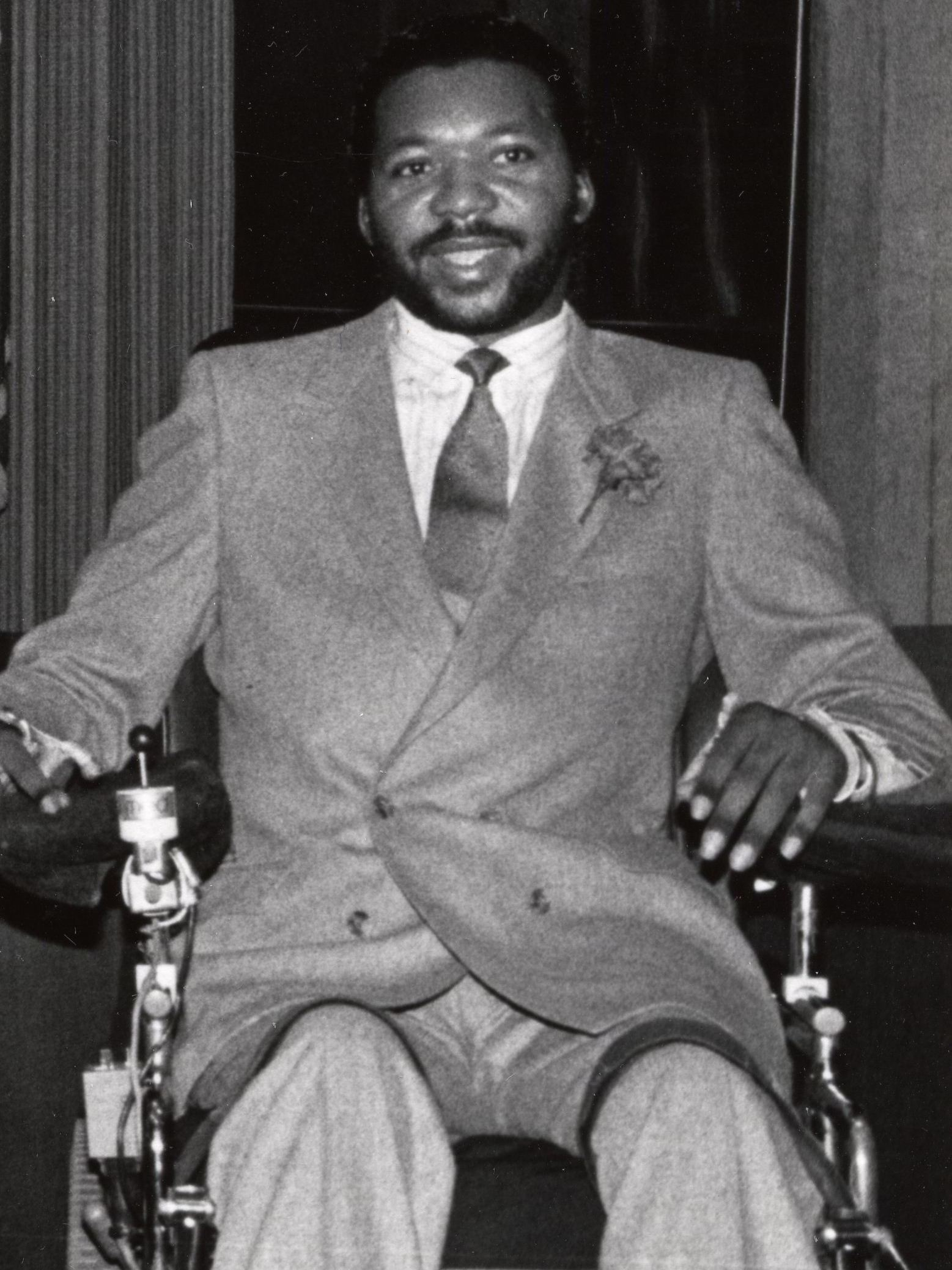
- Stingley in 1985

No. 84
- Position: Wide receiver

Personal information
- Born: September 18, 1951; Chicago, Illinois, U.S.
- Died: April 5, 2007 (aged 55); Chicago, Illinois, U.S.
- Listed height: 6 ft 0 in (1.83 m)
- Listed weight: 194 lb (88 kg)

Career information
- High school: John Marshall (Chicago)
- College: Purdue (1970–1972)
- NFL draft: 1973: 1st round, 19th overall pick

Career history
- New England Patriots (1973–1977)

Awards and highlights
- 1973 North–South Shrine Game selection; 1973 Coaches All-American Game selection; 1973 College All-Star Game; 1972 All-American (HM), All-Big Ten; Chicago Sports Hall of Fame (2004); Purdue Athletic Hall of Fame (2004); Jaycees' Ten Outstanding Young Men of America Award

Career NFL statistics
- Receptions: 110
- Receiving yards: 1,883
- Receiving touchdowns: 14
- Stats at Pro Football Reference

Darryl Floyd Stingley (September 18, 1951 – April 5, 2007) was an American professional football player who was a wide receiver for five seasons with the New England Patriots of the National Football League (NFL). His career was ended at age 26 by an on-field spinal cord injury. He died from heart disease and pneumonia complicated by tetraplegia.

== Early life ==
Stingley was born to Hilda M. Stingley & Harold E. Stingley Sr. and raised on Chicago's West Side. He was a standout running back and honor student at John Marshall High School, and graduated in 1969. Stingley accepted a football scholarship to Purdue University, where he was converted into a wide receiver under head coach Bob DeMoss.

Selected nineteenth overall in the first round of the 1973 NFL draft, he was the third player taken by the Patriots in the first round, along with offensive lineman John Hannah (4) of Alabama and fullback Sam Cunningham (11) of Southern California.

== Professional career ==
Stingley had 110 receptions for 1,883 yards and 14 touchdowns in 60 regular season games for the Patriots. He also had 28 carries for 244 yards and two touchdowns, 19 punt returns for 136 yards and eight kickoff returns for 187 yards. He had over 500 combined yards rushing, receiving and returning both punt and kickoffs in 1973 and 1975. He finished his career with 2,450 combined yards rushing, receiving, and returning both punts and kickoffs. He ran for a 23-yard touchdown in 1974 during the Pats' 42–3 win over the Baltimore Colts on October 6. Stingley both ran for a 34-yard touchdown and caught a 21-yard touchdown pass in their 21–17 win over the Kansas City Chiefs on September 18, 1977, his 26th birthday. He is one of only three Patriots players to catch a touchdown pass on his birthday, and is the only wide receiver to run for a touchdown and have a touchdown reception on his birthday.

=== Injury ===
In a 1978 preseason game against the Oakland Raiders at Oakland Coliseum on August 12, Stingley was hit by Raiders defensive back Jack Tatum. As Stingley stretched for an overthrown pass, he and Tatum collided. Stingley's helmet made contact with Tatum's shoulder pad, compressing his spinal cord and breaking his fourth and fifth cervical vertebrae. He eventually regained limited movement in his right arm but spent the rest of his life as a tetraplegic. The injury came just after Stingley had finished negotiating a contract extension that would have made him one of the highest-paid receivers in the NFL. The new contract was to be announced when the Patriots returned from the West Coast. Instead, it was never signed.

Although controversial, the hit was not against NFL rules at the time since it was not helmet-to-helmet contact (it was a shoulder-to-helmet contact). No penalty was called on the play. Today, however, the NFL has banned all blows to the head or neck of a defenseless player and has disallowed players to launch themselves in tackling defenseless players.

The incident became a symbol of violence in football. Stingley reportedly described it as a "freak accident." Because Stingley was a young player at the height of his career, his injuries attracted significant public attention. Partly in response to Stingley's injuries, the NFL changed its rules and conventions to curtail aggressive plays. Stingley told the Chicago Tribune that he approved of more restrictive officiating, saying "It has opened the game up to allow receivers to get downfield. And it has made the game more exciting."

The Raiders coach, John Madden, and many of his teammates extended their sympathies to Stingley. Madden's postgame rush to the hospital was the beginning of a close friendship. During his visit, Madden found himself the lone visitor in the hospital. No one from the Patriots was there until Madden called their team and the team's charter plane, in takeoff mode, finally returned to the gate. Raiders offensive guard Gene Upshaw also befriended Stingley and later was instrumental in securing benefits for disabled players through the NFL Players' Association.

A settlement was reached with the NFL, with the Patriots agreeing to pay for all of Stingley's medical expenses for the rest of his life as well as his and his children's education.

== NFL career statistics ==
Legend
**Bold**	Career high

=== Regular season ===
Year	Team	Games		Receiving					Rushing				
Year	Team	GP	GS	Rec	Yds	Avg	Lng	TD	Att.	Yds	Avg.	Lng	TD
1973	NE	**14**	10	23	339	14.7	25	2	6	**64**	10.7	19	0
1974	NE	5	2	10	139	13.9	20	1	5	63	**12.6**	23	**1**
1975	NE	**14**	**14**	21	378	18.0	45	2	6	39	6.5	21	0
1976	NE	13	13	17	370	**21.8**	58	4	**8**	45	5.6	27	0
1977	NE	**14**	**14**	**39**	**657**	16.8	**68**	**5**	3	33	11.0	**34**	**1**
		60	53	110	1,883	17.1	68	14	28	244	8.7	34	2

=== Playoffs ===
Year	Team	Games		Receiving					Rushing				
Year	Team	GP	GS	Rec	Yds	Avg	Lng	TD	Att.	Yds	Avg.	Lng	TD
1976	NWE	**1**	**1**	**2**	**36**	**18.0**	**24**	0	0	0	0.0	0	0
		1	1	2	36	18.0	24	0	0	0	0.0	0	0

== Post-football activities ==
On May 9, 1992, having completed his remaining 24 credit hours through a correspondence course program, Darryl Stingley received his bachelor of physical education from Purdue University.

Even though Stingley said he forgave Tatum, the pair never reconciled. Tatum reached out to Stingley several times, including while promoting his own autobiography. HBO invited both men to appear on the 25th anniversary of the incident but Stingley refused after he learned of the title of Tatum's 1996 biography, Final Confessions of NFL Assassin Jack Tatum, the third with that term in its title. Stingley worried Tatum's efforts to contact him were profit-motivated. However, in a 1992 article in Jet, Stingley said that while he had forgiven Tatum a long time ago, Tatum had opportunities to contact him any time after the injury but did not make an effort.

Stingley later served as executive director of player personnel for the Patriots. Stingley co-authored a 1983 memoir, Happy to Be Alive, with Mark Mulvoy. In 1993, he started a nonprofit organization to help troubled youth in west Chicago. Darryl has three sons – Darryl Stingley Jr.; John Smith-Stingley, a Chicago police detective, and Derek Stingley, who played defensive back in the Arena Football League. Stingley's grandson Derek Stingley Jr. was the #1 rated player for the class of 2019 by Rivals.com and was selected third overall in the 2022 NFL draft by the Houston Texans.

== Death ==
On April 5, 2007, Stingley died at Northwestern Memorial Hospital in Chicago after being discovered unresponsive in his home. His death was attributed to heart disease and pneumonia complicated by tetraplegia. The Cook County medical examiner, Kendall Von Crowns, MD, listed Stingley's manner of death as an accident.
