= William Henry Spencer High School =

Spencer High School

Location
- 1000 Fort Benning Road; Columbus, Muscogee County, Georgia 31903; United States; 32°26′1″N 84°56′19″W

Information
- Established: 1930
- School district: Muscogee County School District
- Principal: Rosa Patterson
- Teaching staff: 64.30 (on an FTE basis)
- Grades: 9–12
- Enrollment: 1,016 (2024–2025)
- Student to teacher ratio: 15.80
- Campus size: 37 Acres
- Colors: Green and gold
- Mascot: Owl
- Team name: Greenwave
- Website: sites.muscogee.k12.ga.us/spencer/

William Henry Spencer High School, is at 1000 Fort Benning Road in Columbus, Georgia, United States. The school colors are green and gold. The school mascot is the Owl, representing wisdom. The school also defines itself as "The Greenwave."

The original school was established on November 29, 1930, by the Columbus Public Schools as the first African American high school in Columbus. The school was named in honor of Dr. William Henry Spencer, Supervisor of the Colored Schools in Muscogee County. The teaching staff consisted of 15 members.

== History ==
The first Spencer High School was built on 10th Avenue at 8th Street. The facility served as the home of Marshall Junior High School after Spencer High School relocated to 1830 Shepherd Drive in 1953. Marshall Junior High operated in this location until it was destroyed by fire.

The second Spencer High School was located at 1830 Shepherd Drive (now Marshall Middle School). The Shepherd Drive location was designated as the Columbus city high school that military-dependent students from neighboring Fort Benning would attend after the 5th Circuit Court's 1971 desegregation order was handed down. Prior to this time, Fort Benning agreed it would never build a high school on the military reservation and would instead send their high school-age children to either Baker High, where children of enlisted personnel were bussed, or Columbus High, where children whose parents were officers were bussed. In essence, the desegregation of Spencer High was accomplished with the reallocation of military dependents from Fort Benning, together with non-minority students from outlying Columbus neighborhoods.

In 1978, the Muscogee County School Board voted to close Spencer High School and move the students to a new high school located at 4340 Victory Drive on the Fort Benning military reservation. The name of this new high school was intended to be "Southwest High School," and its colors were to be blue and white. Incidentally, blue and white were the school colors for Baker High School (closed in 1991), about a mile west of the current Spencer High campus. A group of young men, having taken the name "The Golden Owls," came to the rescue of Spencer High School. They appeared before both the School Board and City Council convinced both organizations to preserve the Spencer High School name and its colors of green and gold.

The 4340 Victory Drive facility developed engineering issues such as foundation settling, cracked floors and tilting walls. As a result, in November 2016, the City of Columbus and the Muscogee County School District authorized funding to build a new facility.

The newest Spencer High School opened in August 2018, is located at 1000 Fort Benning Road, and is designed to accommodate around 1,100 students. This includes a rapidly expanding computer science and electronic game design magnet program, growing from an estimated 120 to more than 200 students. Spencer High School is now a 200,000-square-foot, three-floor facility:

- First floor: administrative offices, auditorium, gym, library, cafeteria, juice bar and spirit store (run by marketing students), career center and rooms for automotive technology, cosmetology, marketing, art, band/orchestra, chorus and dance.
- Second floor: classrooms for English language arts, math and social studies.
- Third floor: classrooms for science and computer labs.

In addition, Spencer is able to offer each sport its own space, including an artificial turf field for football and soccer (for varsity practice and junior varsity games), a smaller grass field, track, baseball and softball fields, and storage, locker, wrestling and weight rooms.

== Other information ==
=== Sports ===
The Georgia Interscholastic Association held state championship sport competitions from 1948 to 1970. In 1971, GIA high schools joined the Georgia High School Association.

Spencer High School won the GIA Football State Championship in 1950, 1952, 1956 and 1967. Coach Odis Spencer was the head coach at Spencer for 26 years. He and his staff won 4 state championships. They won 5 Runner-up titles. They claimed 10 Regional titles. They also won 10 sectional titles. At present, he is the only Black Coach in the State of Georgia who has been selected for the Georgia Coaches Hall of Fame. Coach Spencer was the GIA Coach of the Year four times. Spencer High School was the 1973 co-State Champion in Track and Field.

=== Interscholastic Rifle Championships ===
Spencer High was a powerhouse in 50-foot gallery small-bore rifle marksmanship from 1972 through 1988. During this period, the Superintendent's Trophy (basically the All-City Championships) was retired in 1975 and again in 1978 after three consecutive wins. Spencer's rifle team won the Georgia State Interscholastic Rifle Championship in 1976. Spencer won the State Championship again in 1979, 1980, 1982, 1984 and 1985.

== Notable alumni ==
- Gary Downs, former NFL player
- Albert J. Edmonds, U.S. Air Force lieutenant general
- Randy Fuller, former NFL player
- Ernie Green (class of 1958), former NFL player
- Michael Registe, American criminal profiled on America's Most Wanted
- Barbara A. Robinson, member of the Maryland Senate
- Kevin D. Rome, university administrator, 16th president of Fisk University
- Steve Reese, former NFL player
- Eddie Rush, NBA referee
- Otis Sistrunk, former NFL player
- Maretta Taylor, educator and legislator; also on the faculty
- Cleo Walker, former NFL player
- Moe Williams, former NFL player
- Gladys A. Robinson, member of North Carolina State Senate
