= Kevin D. Rome =

American academic administrator

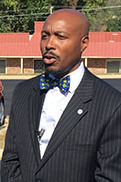

16th President of Fisk University
- In office July 1, 2017 – August 25, 2020
- Preceded by: H. James Williams
- Succeeded by: Vann R. Newkirk

19th President of Lincoln University
- In office June 1, 2013 – June 30, 2017
- Preceded by: Carolyn Mahoney
- Succeeded by: Jerald Woolfolk

Personal details
- Spouse: Stephanie Baker
- Children: 2
- Education: Morehouse College (BA); University of Georgia (MA); University of Texas at Austin (PhD)
- Profession: Academic administrator

Kevin D. Rome Sr. (born May 29, 1966) is an American university administrator. He served as the 16th president of Fisk University, a historically black university in Nashville, Tennessee. He was previously the president of Lincoln University from 2013 to 2017.

== Early life ==
Kevin Darnell Rome was born May 29, 1966. He was educated at the Spencer High School in Columbus, Georgia. He graduated from Morehouse College, where he earned a bachelor's degree in English in 1989. He earned a master's degree of education in College Student Personnel from the University of Georgia in 1991 and a PhD in Higher Education Administration from the University of Texas at Austin in 2001.

== Career ==
Rome was assistant vice chancellor for student life and diversity at Indiana University – Purdue University Indianapolis, vice president for campus life at Clayton State University, and vice president for student services at Morehouse College. He was also the vice chancellor for student affairs and enrollment management at North Carolina Central University until 2013.

Rome was the president of Lincoln University from 2013 to 2017. During his tenure, he focused on rebranding the school and recruiting students from all over Missouri, especially "better-prepared students." In November 2016, he urged students to focus on building careers and pursuing leadership positions instead of protesting. Rome succeeded Frank L. Sims as the 16th president of Fisk University in June 2017. Rome departed Fisk in August 2020, following the filing of a restraining order alleging that he had threatened a man that he had an intimate relationship with. The man also alleged that Rome drugged him. Rome and his attorney stated the allegations were false and no official charges were filed against Rome at the time of his removal.

== Personal life ==
Rome is a lifetime member of Phi Beta Sigma. Rome and his wife, Stefanie Baker Rome, have twins; son, Kevin and daughter Kendel. He met his wife in 2000 on a blind date in Los Angeles, where he traveled to be a contestant on Wheel of Fortune and won $5,000.
