= William Henry Spencer =

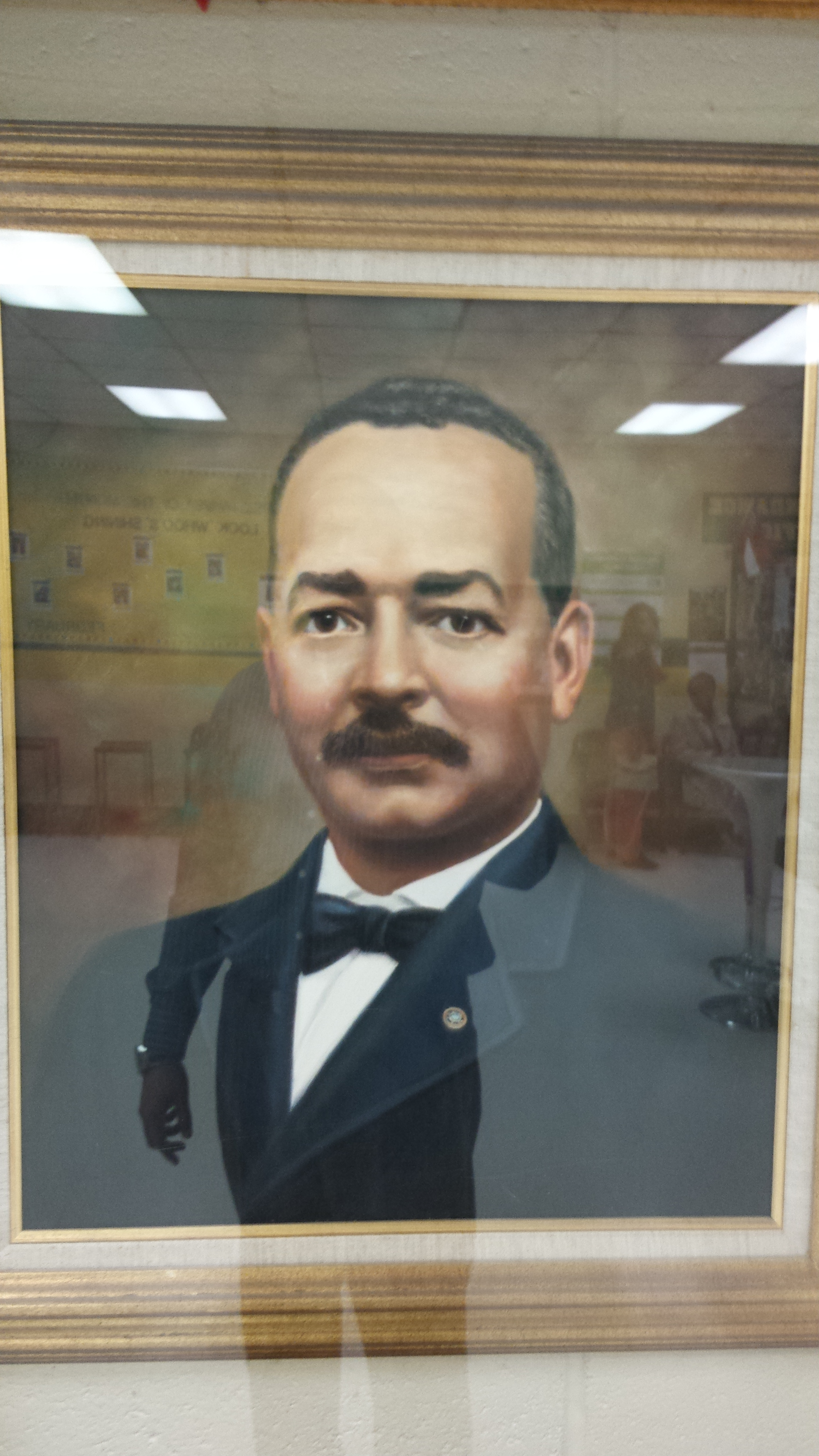
William Henry Spencer

William Henry Spencer (September 1857 – May 30, 1925) was an Afro-American educator in Columbus, Georgia, in the late 19th and early 20th centuries.

== Early years ==
He was born September 1857 to Henry Spencer, a blacksmith, in Columbus, Muscogee County, Georgia. He was raised by his father along with his sisters: Mary, Dora, Hattie, Ella, Leila and Lidia; and a brother, Samuel.

Spencer attended the Asbury Chapel, a Columbus public school designated for African-American children.

After graduating, he applied for and received a certificate for teaching in 1875, marking the beginning of a 50 year career in education.

Spencer began teaching in the Harris County schools. He soon found a position in the Columbus Public Schools. Spencer taught at 5th Avenue School in Columbus under Mr. Peters.

== Family life ==
Spencer married Martha Love in 1879.

They had five children: Ethel, Annie, Alma, Pearl and William Henry Jr.

The Spencers lived on 4th Avenue in Columbus. Today, the Spencer House is on the National Register of Historic Places.

== Career ==
After the American Civil War ended, schools to educate the Freedman were established across the south. In Columbus, the Bureau of Refugees, Freedmen and Abandoned Lands established Claflin School in 1868.

By 1872, schools for African-Americans became a part of the city school system. Columbus Public Schools had 1,174 African-American students attending. Julia Hampton was one of the first African-American teachers in the system. The first school was in rented quarters, Temperance Hall.

In the 1870s, much was done to continue the establishment of schools for blacks. A. J. Ketchum became one of the first black principals in the school system. George Foster Peabody gave the Columbus black schools $600. At that time there were 5 black teachers and 13 white teachers. In June 1875, the school board bought the African Methodist Church on Mercer Street for $800 with 1-acre (4,000 m^{2}) of land. This was converted for school purposes and a two-story frame building with four rooms was built on the site. In October 1888, the street and the school name was changed to 6th Street.

By 1880 the school board acquired Claflin School. Spencer was placed in charge of Claflin School in spite of his not receiving a college degree. He was promoted on his ability and passion for the education of African-Americans in Columbus.

Miss Anna Love and Miss Lucy Love, both graduates of the Columbus Public Schools, were elected teachers at Claflin. A report on school enrollment shows total black enrollment was 517, surpassing white enrollment at 462.

In 1882, black schools were overcrowded with enrollment of 827, 599 attending. In May, 160 Black citizens petitioned the Board asking that the grades of their school be raised a year to a total of 9 years. This was not granted since the schools were already overcrowded. It was suggested that an additional story be added to 6th Street school.

The Black citizens of Columbus continued to press the Board for a high school but there was no suitable building to do so.

Spencer continued on as principal of Claflin. In addition to Claflin, there were three other schools for blacks: Sixth Avenue, Fourth Street and 28th Street schools.

As the African-American population grew in Columbus, more schools for blacks were created and Spencer was named Supervisor of Colored Schools while retaining his position as principal at 6th Avenue School.

He improved himself academically and eventually was able to enroll at Clark College in Atlanta.

He was given broad powers in his new role on almost everything affecting the education of African-Americans - from the improvements of the physical facilities, to the hiring and firing of teachers. He was adamant in promoting efforts to improve the curriculum of the black schools in Columbus.

Spencer's main educational goal was to persuade the Columbus Public Schools to provide an accredited high school for African-Americans.

Up until this time, the schools for blacks in Columbus only went to the ninth grade. Parents had to send their children to schools outside of Columbus, usually to Atlanta, if they wanted to go beyond the ninth grade. Eventually, the Board did add one more grade, but Spencer was adamant that a fully accredited high school for African-Americans be created in the City of Columbus. A conditional promise was elicited from the Board contingent on the availability of funds.

Spencer did not live to see his dream become a reality. He was stricken with appendicitis and died on May 30, 1925.

The Board, however, did live up to its promise and erected a fully accredited high school for African-Americans on Tenth Avenue in 1930. The school was named William Henry Spencer High School his honor.
