= Willis Crenshaw =

American football player (1941–2025)

No. 33
- Position: Running back

Personal information
- Born: July 16, 1941; St. Louis, Missouri, U.S.
- Died: October 20, 2025 (aged 84)
- Listed height: 6 ft 2 in (1.88 m)
- Listed weight: 230 lb (104 kg)

Career information
- High school: Soldan (St. Louis)
- College: Kansas State (1959-1963)
- NFL draft: 1963: 9th round, 114th overall pick
- AFL draft: 1963: 26th round, 204th overall pick

Career history
- St. Louis Cardinals (1964–1969); Denver Broncos (1970); New England Patriots (1971)*
- * Offseason or practice squad member only

Career NFL statistics
- Rushing yards: 2,428
- Rushing average: 3.7
- Receptions: 104
- Receiving yards: 797
- Total touchdowns: 18
- Stats at Pro Football Reference

Willis Clarence Crenshaw Jr. (July 16, 1941 – October 20, 2025) was an American professional football player who was a running back in the National Football League (NFL) from 1964 through 1970. He played college football for the Kansas State Wildcats.

== High school and college career ==
Born in St. Louis, Missouri, on July 16, 1941, Crenshaw played for Soldan High School and Kansas State University, where he started out at wide receiver and was a star player; played in the 1963 College All Star Football Game. In high school, his main sport was pole vaulting, with a personal best of 13 feet 2 inches (4.01 m); he started out with a double scholarship at Kansas State, where he recalled being one of approximately 50 Black students, before focusing on football after weight training.

== Professional career ==
=== St Louis Cardinals ===
Crenshaw was selected by the St. Louis Cardinals in the ninth round in 1963 NFL draft. In 1968, he led the team in rushing with 813 yds and touchdowns (7).

=== Denver Broncos ===
In 1970, he was traded to the Denver Broncos in exchange for a third-round draft pick; he played one season, although he was listed for the 1971 season.

== NFL career statistics ==
Legend
**Bold**	Career high

Year	Team	Games		Rushing					Receiving				
Year	Team	GP	GS	Att	Yds	Avg	Lng	TD	Rec	Yds	Avg	Lng	TD
1964	STL	14	3	60	297	**5.0**	49	1	8	58	7.3	19	0
1965	STL	14	10	127	437	3.4	27	0	**23**	**232**	**10.1**	**78**	**1**
1966	STL	14	7	94	360	3.8	33	0	15	46	3.1	19	0
1967	STL	14	1	44	149	3.4	23	0	6	30	5.0	12	0
1968	STL	14	14	**203**	**813**	4.0	**66**	**6**	**23**	**232**	**10.1**	42	**1**
1969	STL	14	5	55	172	3.1	26	3	11	94	8.5	31	0
1970	DEN	12	12	69	200	2.9	25	5	18	105	5.8	35	**1**
		96	52	652	2,428	3.7	66	15	104	797	7.7	78	3

== Later life and death ==
Crenshaw later worked selling life insurance, for Monsanto, and as a financial planner. He died on October 20, 2025, at the age of 84.
