= Kim Jones (American football) =

American football player (born 1952)

No. 39
- Position: Running back

Personal information
- Born: January 19, 1952 (age 74); Waterloo, Iowa, U.S.
- Listed height: 6 ft 4 in (1.93 m)
- Listed weight: 238 lb (108 kg)

Career information
- High school: Columbus (Waterloo)
- College: Colorado State
- NFL draft: 1975: 7th round, 157th overall pick

Career history
- Baltimore Colts (1975)*; New Orleans Saints (1976–1979); Denver Broncos (1980)*
- * Offseason or practice squad member only
- Stats at Pro Football Reference

Kim Richard Jones (born January 19, 1952) is an American former professional football player who was a running back for the New Orleans Saints of the National Football League (NFL). He played college football for the Colorado State Rams.
