= Delles Howell =

American football player (born 1948)

- Howell in 1977

No. 20
- Position: Defensive back

Personal information
- Born: August 22, 1948 (age 78); Vallejo, California, U.S.
- Listed height: 6 ft 3 in (1.91 m)
- Listed weight: 200 lb (91 kg)

Career information
- High school: Monroe (LA) Carroll
- College: Grambling State
- NFL draft: 1970: 4th round, 88th overall pick

Career history
- New Orleans Saints (1970–1972); New York Jets (1973–1975)

Career NFL statistics
- Games played: 71
- Games started: 5
- Interceptions: 17
- Stats at Pro Football Reference

Delles Ray Howell (born August 22, 1948) is an American former professional football player who was a defensive back in the National Football League (NFL). He played college football for the Grambling State Tigers. At 6'3", weighing in at 200 pounds, he was selected by the New Orleans Saints in the fourth round (88th overall pick) in the 1970 NFL draft. He played in the NFL for the Saints (1970–1972) and the New York Jets (1973–1975). He was traded along with Richard Neal from the Saints to the Jets for a pair of 1973 picks in the second and third rounds (51st and 66th overall–Steve Baumgartner and Pete Van Valkenburg respectively) on January 29, 1973.

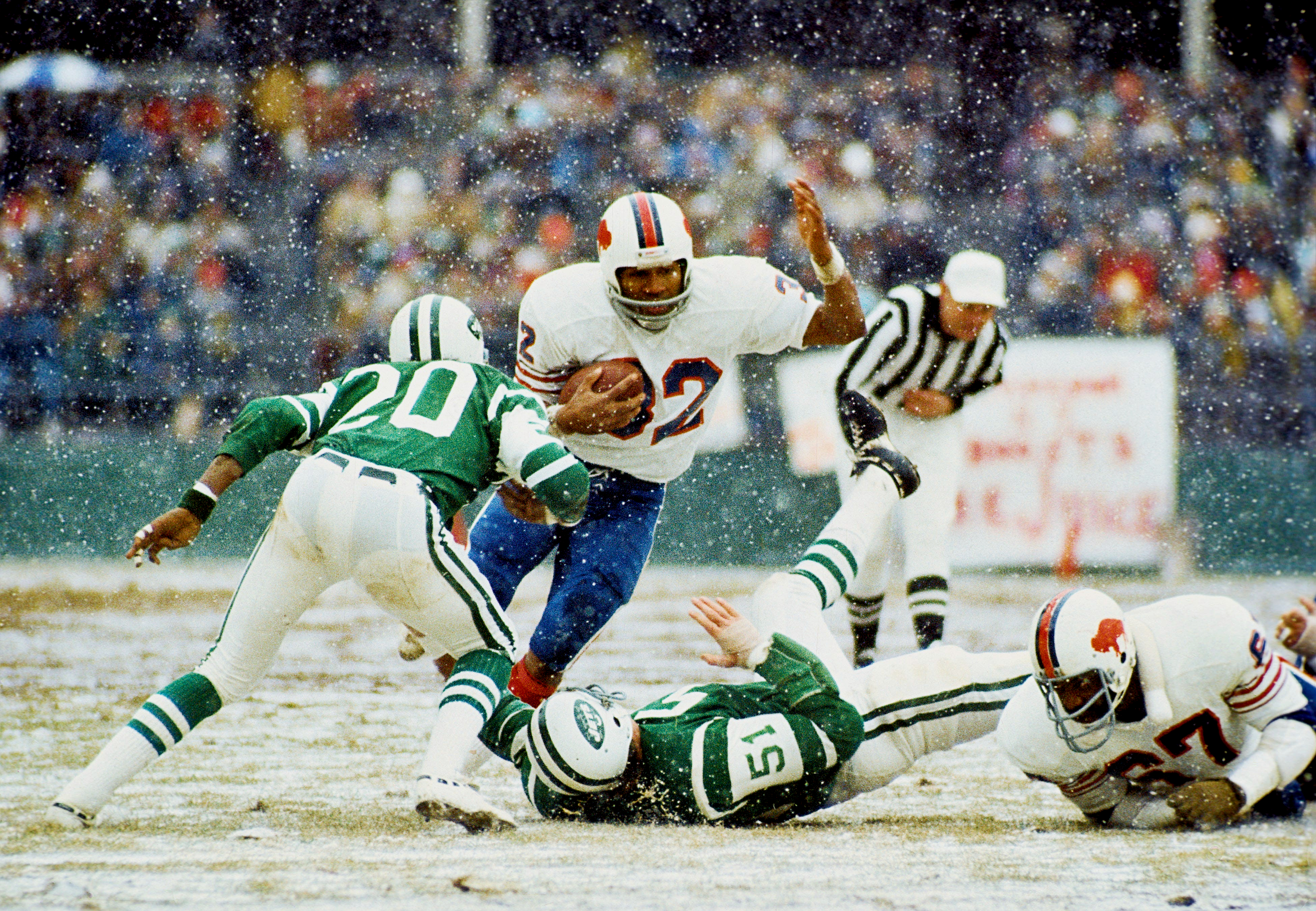
Howell (20) guarding O. J. Simpson for the Jets in 1973.
