= J. J. Jones (quarterback) =

American football player (1952–2009)

No. 11
- Position: Quarterback

Personal information
- Born: April 16, 1952; Memphis, Tennessee, U.S.
- Died: July 9, 2009 (aged 57); Seattle, Washington, U.S.
- Listed height: 6 ft 1 in (1.85 m)
- Listed weight: 190 lb (86 kg)

Career information
- College: Fisk
- NFL draft: 1974: undrafted

Career history
- New York Jets (1974–1975); Calgary Stampeders (1976–1977); TC JETS (Binghamton, New York) (1978–1980)

Career NFL statistics
- Passing attempts: 57
- Passing completions: 16
- Completion percentage: 28.1%
- TD–INT: 1–5
- Passing yards: 181
- Passer rating: 9.6
- Stats at Pro Football Reference

John Eddie "J. J." Jones (April 16, 1952 – July 9, 2009) was an American professional football player who was a quarterback in the National Football League (NFL). He was signed by the New York Jets as an undrafted free agent in 1975, the team's first African-American quarterback. He also played with the Calgary Stampeders of the Canadian Football League (CFL) from 1976 to 1977. He played college football for the Fisk Bulldogs.

He had three children.

Jones died in a house fire in 2009.
