= Tony Plummer =

American football player (born 1947)

No. 43, 35, 21
- Position: Defensive back

Personal information
- Born: January 21, 1947 (age 79); Dallas, Texas, U.S.
- Listed height: 5 ft 11 in (1.80 m)
- Listed weight: 188 lb (85 kg)

Career information
- High school: Redwood City (CA) Sequoia
- College: Pacific
- NFL draft: 1970: 10th round, 242nd overall pick

Career history
- St. Louis Cardinals (1970); Atlanta Falcons (1971–1973); Los Angeles Rams (1974)
- Stats at Pro Football Reference

Tony Plummer (born January 21, 1947) is an American former professional football player who was a defensive back in the National Football League (NFL). He played college football for the Pacific Tigers. Plummer played in the NFL for the St. Louis Cardinals in 1970, Atlanta Falcons from 1971 to 1973 and Los Angeles Rams in 1974.
