= Willie Brister =

American football player (born 1952)

No. 86
- Position: Tight end

Personal information
- Born: January 28, 1952 (age 74); Tylertown, Mississippi, U.S.
- Listed height: 6 ft 4 in (1.93 m)
- Listed weight: 236 lb (107 kg)

Career information
- High school: Baton Rouge (LA)
- College: Southern
- NFL draft: 1974: 15th round, 370th overall pick

Career history
- New York Jets (1974–1975)

Career NFL statistics
- Games played: 24
- Receptions: 6
- Receiving yards: 93
- Receiving TDs: 0
- Stats at Pro Football Reference

Willie Jerry Brister (born January 28, 1952) is an American former professional football player who was a tight end for the New York Jets of the National Football League (NFL) from 1974 to 1975. He played college football for the Southern Jaguars.
