= 1975 New England Patriots season =

Season of National Football League team the New England Patriots

- Owner: Billy Sullivan
- General manager: Chuck Fairbanks
- Head coach: Chuck Fairbanks
- Home stadium: Schaefer Stadium

Results
- Record: 3–11
- Division place: T-4th AFC East
- Playoffs: Did not qualify
- All-Pros: None
- Pro Bowlers: None

The 1975 New England Patriots season was the franchise's sixth season in the National Football League and 16th overall. The Patriots ended the season with a record of three wins and eleven losses, and finished tied for fourth in the AFC East Division. The Patriots had put up their best season in nearly a decade in 1974, finishing the year with a 7–7 record and earning their first season with at least a .500 winning percentage since 1966. However, New England continued its forgetful period of the '70s, as they finished 3–11 and missed the playoffs for the 12th straight season. New England started terribly, losing its first 4 games, each by 7 or more points. After winning 3 of their next 4 games, the Patriots would lose their final six games to conclude the season. Although they tied the New York Jets for last place in the AFC East, they lost the tiebreaker by virtue of New York winning both matchups during the season.

== Draft ==
1975 New England Patriots draft
Round	Pick	Player	Position	College	Notes
1	16	Russ Francis *	Tight end	Oregon	
2	41	Rod Shoate	Linebacker	Oklahoma	
3	66	Peter Cusick	Defensive tackle	Ohio State	
4	86	Allen Carter	Running back	USC	
4	91	Steve Burks	Wide receiver	Arkansas State	
5	116	Steve Grogan	Quarterback	Kansas State	
5	117	Steve Freeman	Defensive back	Mississippi State	
7	172	Lawrence Williams	Wide receiver	Texas Tech	
11	272	Rene Garrett	Defensive back	Idaho State	
12	297	Matt Kendon	Defensive tackle	Idaho State	
12	306	Condredge Holloway	Quarterback	Tennessee	
13	328	Joe Harvey	Defensive end	Northern Michigan	
14	353	Tom Gossom	Wide receiver	Auburn	
15	378	Don Clayton	Running back	Murray State	
16	403	Kerry Marbury	Running back	West Virginia	
17	428	Myke Horton	Tackle	UCLA	
Made roster * Made at least one Pro Bowl during career

== Staff ==
1975 New England Patriots staff
Front office: President – Robert L. Marr; Vice president/treasurer – George Sargent; Assistant general manager – Peter Hadhazy; Director of player personnel – Bucko Kilroy; Personnel executive director – J. I. Albrecht; Head coaches: General manager/head coach – Chuck Fairbanks; Assistant head coach/defensive line – Hank Bullough; Offensive coaches: Quarterbacks – John Polonchek; Running backs – Ron Erhardt; Receivers – Ray Perkins; Offensive line – Red Miller	Defensive coaches: Inside linebackers – Charlie Sumner; Outside linebackers – Rollie Dotsch; Defensive backs – Larrye Weaver; Special teams coaches: Special teams – Jim Valek; Special teams assistant – Tom Yewcic

== Roster ==
1975 New England Patriots roster
Quarterbacks (QB): 15 Neil Graff; 14 Steve Grogan; 16 Jim Plunkett; Running backs (RB): 44 Don Calhoun; 21 Allen Carter; 39 Sam Cunningham; 32 Andy Johnson; 31 Leon McQuay; Wide receivers (WR): 82 Steve Burks; 84 Darryl Stingley; 18 Randy Vataha; Tight ends (TE): 81 Russ Francis; 86 Bob Windsor	Offensive linemen (OL): 61 Sam Adams G; 62 Steve Corbett G; 68 Bill DuLac G; 58 Doug Dumler C; 70 Leon Gray T; 73 John Hannah G; 63 Shelby Jordan T; 67 Bill Lenkaitis C; Defensive linemen (DL): 85 Julius Adams DE; 76 Peter Cusick NT; 71 Ray Hamilton NT; 74 Craig Hanneman DE; 64 Martin Imhof DE; 78 Tony McGee DE; 72 Jerry Patton DE	Linebackers (LB): 59 Bob Geddes ILB; 50 Sam Hunt ILB; 52 Steve King OLB; 57 Steve Nelson ILB; 55 Kevin Reilly OLB; 54 Steve Zabel OLB; Defensive backs (DB): 27 Ron Bolton CB; 22 Dick Conn FS; 24 Bob Howard CB; 29 Durwood Keeton SS; 47 Jim Massey CB; 34 Prentice McCray SS; 25 Deac Sanders FS; Special teams (ST): 2 Mike Patrick P; 1 John Smith K	Reserve: 35 Leon Crosswhite RB (IR); 51 Maury Damkroger LB (IR); 72 Mel Lunsford DE (Left squad); 88 Al Marshall WR (IR); 75 Arthur Moore NT (IR); 77 Tom Neville T (IR); 56 Rod Shoate LB (IR); 90 George Webster LB (IR); 23 Joe Wilson RB (IR); Rookies in italics

== Regular season ==
=== Schedule ===
Week	Date	Opponent	Result	Record	Venue	Attendance	Game Recap
1	September 21	Houston Oilers	**L** 0–7	0–1	Schaefer Stadium	51,934	Recap
2	September 28	**Miami Dolphins**	**L** 14–22	0–2	Schaefer Stadium	60,602	Recap
3	October 5	at **New York Jets**	**L** 7–36	0–3	Shea Stadium	57,365	Recap
4	October 12	at Cincinnati Bengals	**L** 10–27	0–4	Riverfront Stadium	51,220	Recap
5	October 19	**Baltimore Colts**	**W** 21–10	1–4	Schaefer Stadium	51,417	Recap
6	October 26	San Francisco 49ers	**W** 24–16	2–4	Schaefer Stadium	60,358	Recap
7	November 2	at St. Louis Cardinals	**L** 17–24	2–5	Busch Memorial Stadium	45,907	Recap
8	November 9	at San Diego Chargers	**W** 33–19	3–5	San Diego Stadium	24,349	Recap
9	November 16	Dallas Cowboys	**L** 31–34	3–6	Schaefer Stadium	60,905	Recap
10	November 23	at **Buffalo Bills**	**L** 31–45	3–7	Rich Stadium	65,655	Recap
11	December 1	at **Miami Dolphins**	**L** 7–20	3–8	Miami Orange Bowl	61,963	Recap
12	December 7	**New York Jets**	**L** 28–30	3–9	Schaefer Stadium	53,989	Recap
13	December 14	**Buffalo Bills**	**L** 14–34	3–10	Schaefer Stadium	58,393	Recap
14	December 21	at **Baltimore Colts**	**L** 21–34	3–11	Memorial Stadium	48,678	Recap
Note: Intra-division opponents are in **bold** text.

=== Standings ===
AFC East
	W	L	T	PCT	DIV	CONF	PF	PA	STK
Baltimore Colts^{(3)}	10	4	0	.714	6–2	8–3	395	269	W9
Miami Dolphins	10	4	0	.714	6–2	7–4	357	222	W1
Buffalo Bills	8	6	0	.571	5–3	7–4	420	355	L1
New York Jets	3	11	0	.214	2–6	3–8	258	433	L2
New England Patriots	3	11	0	.214	1–7	2–9	258	358	L6

== See also ==
- New England Patriots seasons
