= Mike Siwek =

American football player (born 1948)

No. 68
- Position: Defensive tackle

Personal information
- Born: April 12, 1948 (age 78); Mishawaka, Indiana, U.S.
- Listed height: 6 ft 3 in (1.91 m)
- Listed weight: 265 lb (120 kg)

Career information
- High school: St. Joseph's
- College: Western Michigan
- NFL draft: 1970: 11th round, 267th overall pick

Career history
- St. Louis Cardinals (1970); Washington Redskins (1972)*
- * Offseason or practice squad member only
- Stats at Pro Football Reference

Michael Joseph Siwek (born April 12, 1948) is an American former professional football player who was a defensive tackle for the St. Louis Cardinals of National Football League (NFL). He played college football for the Western Michigan University.
