= Gordie Browne =

American football player (born 1951)

No. 79
- Position: Tackle

Personal information
- Born: December 5, 1951 (age 74); Franklin, Massachusetts, U.S.
- Listed height: 6 ft 5 in (1.96 m)
- Listed weight: 265 lb (120 kg)

Career information
- High school: Chambersburg (PA), Millis (MA)
- College: Boston College
- NFL draft: 1974: 2nd round, 31st overall pick

Career history
- New York Jets (1974–1975)
- Stats at Pro Football Reference

Gordie Browne (born December 5, 1951) is an American former professional football player who was a tackle for the New York Jets of the National Football League (NFL) from 1974 to 1975. He played college football for the Boston College Eagles.
