= Greg Gantt =

American football player (1951–2011)

No. 8
- Position: Punter

Personal information
- Born: October 30, 1951; Birmingham, Alabama, U.S.
- Died: October 26, 2011 (aged 59); Birmingham, Alabama, U.S.
- Listed height: 5 ft 11 in (1.80 m)
- Listed weight: 188 lb (85 kg)

Career information
- High school: Birmingham (AL) Woodlawn
- College: Alabama
- NFL draft: 1974: 8th round, 187th overall pick

Career history
- New York Jets (1974–1975)

Awards and highlights
- National champion (1973); 2× First-team All-SEC (1972, 1973); Second-team All-SEC (1971)

Career NFL statistics
- Punts: 134
- Punt yards: 4,845
- Longest punt: 71
- Stats at Pro Football Reference

Greg Gantt (October 30, 1951 – October 26, 2011) was an American professional football punter. He played for the New York Jets from 1974 to 1975.

He died of complications of heart disease and diabetes on October 26, 2011, in Birmingham, Alabama at age 59.
