= Royce McKinney =

American football player (born 1953)

No. 41
- Position: Defensive back

Personal information
- Born: November 3, 1953 (age 73); River Rouge, Michigan, U.S.
- Listed height: 6 ft 1 in (1.85 m)
- Listed weight: 190 lb (86 kg)

Career information
- High school: River Rouge
- College: Kentucky State
- NFL draft: 1975: 9th round, 209th overall pick

Career history
- Buffalo Bills (1975)
- Stats at Pro Football Reference

Royce McKinney (born November 3, 1953) is an American former professional football player who was a defensive back for the Buffalo Bills of the National Football League (NFL) in 1975. He played college football for the Kentucky State Thorobreds.
