= Paul White (American football, born 1948) =

American football player (1948–2001)

- White, circa 1971

No. 38, 30
- Position: Running back

Personal information
- Born: September 17, 1948; San Antonio, Texas, U.S.
- Died: June 23, 2001 (aged 52); San Antonio, Texas, U.S.
- Listed height: 6 ft 0 in (1.83 m)
- Listed weight: 200 lb (91 kg)

Career information
- High school: Thomas Jefferson (San Antonio)
- College: UTEP
- NFL draft: 1970: 9th round, 214th overall pick

Career history
- St. Louis Cardinals (1970–1971)
- Stats at Pro Football Reference

Paul Nathaniel White (September 17, 1948 – June 23, 2001) was an American professional football running back who played for the St. Louis Cardinals of the National Football League (NFL). He played college football for the UTEP Miners and was selected by the Cardinals in the ninth round of the 1970 NFL draft.

== Early life ==
Paul Nathaniel White was born on September 17, 1948, in San Antonio, Texas. He played high school football at Thomas Jefferson High School in San Antonio as a flanker and linebacker. He earned San Antonio Express-News All-City honors at linebacker in 1965.

== College career ==
White enrolled at the The University of Texas at El Paso to play college football for the Miners. He hoped to play flanker at UTEP but was converted to running back. He played for the freshman team in 1966 and the varsity team from 1967 to 1969. White rushed 161 times for 572 yards and eight touchdowns during his varsity career while also catching 29 passes for 404 yards and four touchdowns. He only played in three games his senior year due to mono.

== Professional career ==
White was selected by the St. Louis Cardinals in the ninth round, with the 214th overall pick, of the 1970 NFL draft. He was released on September 14 before the start of the 1970 regular season. On November 22, it was reported that White had been re-signed by the Cardinals to replace Charlie Pittman, who was placed on the "move list". It was speculated that White would be used on special teams. He played in the final five games for the Cardinals, returning three kickoffs for 65 yards.

White hoped to see more playing time in 1971 under new head coach Bob Hollway. However, he only ended up appearing in six games, recording one carry for three yards before missing the rest of the year due to knee surgery. He was released on July 19, 1972, during training camp after a physical showed that his knee had not full recovered.

== Personal life ==
White died on June 23, 2001, in San Antonio. His obituary said that he was an "outstanding community leader, coach, friend, and father."
