= Marv Owens =

American football player (born 1950)

No. 37
- Position: Wide receiver

Personal information
- Born: June 16, 1950 (age 76); Orange County, California, U.S.
- Listed height: 5 ft 11 in (1.80 m)
- Listed weight: 203 lb (92 kg)

Career information
- High school: Fullerton Union
- College: San Diego State
- NFL draft: 1972: 14th round, 361st overall pick

Career history
- Minnesota Vikings (1972)*; St. Louis Cardinals (1973); New York Jets (1974)
- * Offseason or practice squad member only
- Stats at Pro Football Reference

Marvin Duane Owens (born June 16, 1950) is an American former professional football player who was a wide receiver for the St. Louis Cardinals and the New York Jets of National Football League (NFL). He played college football for the San Diego State University.
