= Rich Lewis =

American football player (born 1950)

No. 55, 56, 53, 57
- Position: Linebacker

Personal information
- Born: June 8, 1950 (age 76); Lynwood, California, U.S.
- Listed height: 6 ft 3 in (1.91 m)
- Listed weight: 220 lb (100 kg)

Career information
- High school: Grant (Portland, Oregon)
- College: Portland State
- NFL draft: 1972: undrafted

Career history
- Houston Oilers (1972); Buffalo Bills (1973–1974); New York Jets (1974–1975)

Career NFL statistics
- Sacks: 1
- Fumble recoveries: 2
- Interceptions: 1
- Stats at Pro Football Reference

Richard L. Lewis (born June 8, 1950) is an American former professional football player who was a linebacker in the National Football League (NFL) for the Houston Oilers, Buffalo Bills, and New York Jets. He played college football for the Portland State Vikings. He also played in the Canadian Football League (CFL) for the Toronto Argonauts in the 1976–79 seasons and the Hamilton Tiger-Cats in 1977.
