= Steve Reese (American football) =

American football player (born 1952)

No. 52
- Position: Linebacker

Personal information
- Born: January 7, 1952 (age 74); Columbus, Georgia, U.S.
- Listed height: 6 ft 2 in (1.88 m)
- Listed weight: 229 lb (104 kg)

Career information
- High school: William H. Spencer (GA)
- College: Louisville
- NFL draft: 1974: undrafted

Career history
- New York Jets (1974–1975); Tampa Bay Buccaneers (1976)
- Stats at Pro Football Reference

Stephen Reese (born January 7, 1952) is a former National Football League (NFL) linebacker who played for the New York Jets and Tampa Bay Buccaneers from 1974 to 1976. He attended William H. Spencer High School and then the University of Louisville before being signed by the Jets.
