= Bob Burns (running back) =

American football player (born 1952)

No. 33
- Position: Running back

Personal information
- Born: January 12, 1952 (age 74); Tampa, Florida, U.S.
- Listed height: 6 ft 3 in (1.91 m)
- Listed weight: 212 lb (96 kg)

Career information
- High school: Chamberlain (Tampa)
- College: Georgia
- NFL draft: 1974: 9th round, 214th overall pick

Career history
- New York Jets (1974)

Career NFL statistics
- Rushing attempts: 40
- Rushing yards: 158
- Total TDs: 1
- Stats at Pro Football Reference

Robert Henry Burns (born January 12, 1952) is an American former professional football player who was a running back for the New York Jets of the National Football League (NFL). He graduated in 1970 from Chamberlain High School in Tampa, Florida where he was on the football, baseball and track teams. He played college football for the Georgia Bulldogs. He is the father of Major League Baseball (MLB) player Billy Burns.

Burns played only the 1974 season for the Jets. His best game came against the New York Giants, which was played at the Yale Bowl in New Haven, Connecticut. Filling in for the injured FB John Riggins, Burns gained with 101 yards on 21 attempts in the 26–20 Jets win.
