= Wayne Mulligan =

American football player (born 1947)

No. 50
- Positions: Center, Guard

Personal information
- Born: May 5, 1947 (age 79); Baltimore, Maryland, U.S.
- Listed height: 6 ft 3 in (1.91 m)
- Listed weight: 250 lb (113 kg)

Career information
- High school: Calvert Hall College (Towson, Maryland)
- College: Clemson (1965-1968)
- NFL draft: 1969: 8th round, 201st overall pick

Career history
- St. Louis Cardinals (1969–1973); New York Jets (1974–1975)

Career NFL statistics
- Games played: 87
- Games started: 65
- Fumble recoveries: 4
- Stats at Pro Football Reference

Wayne Eugene Mulligan (born May 5, 1947) is an American former professional football player who was a center for seven seasons with the St. Louis Cardinals and the New York Jets of the National Football League (NFL). He played college football for the Clemson Tigers.

== Amateur career ==
Mulligan played high school football at Calvert Hall where he helped lead them to a Baltimore Catholic League title in 1964. He went to college at Clemson University where he was the starting center from 1966-1968 and helped the Tigers to consecutive ACC championships in 1966-1967.

== Pro career ==
Mulligan was selected in the eighth round (201st overall) in the 1969 NFL/AFL draft by the St. Louis Cardinals. He was Jim Hart's center for five years before being traded to the Chicago Bears before the 1974 season. Just a few days later, the Bears traded Mulligan to the New York Jets where he became Joe Namath's center for two seasons. Mulligan retired after the 1975 season. He played 87 games in the National Football League over his seven year career.

== After Football ==
Mulligan resides in South Carolina and is the father of three adult children: Stacey, Kelley, and Patrick; and the grandfather of eight.
