= Charley Winner =

American football player and coach (1924–2023)

Profile
- Position: Head Coach

Personal information
- Born: July 2, 1924; Somerville, New Jersey, U.S.
- Died: July 18, 2023 (aged 99); Bonita Springs, Florida, U.S.

Career information
- College: Washington University in St. Louis

Career history

Playing
- Washington University in St. Louis (1946–1948)

Coaching
- Case Tech (1950–1953) (asst.); Baltimore Colts (1954–1965) (asst.); St. Louis Cardinals (1966–1970); Washington Redskins (1971–1972) (asst.); New York Jets (1973) (asst.); New York Jets (1974–1975); Cincinnati Bengals (1975–1979) (asst.); Miami Dolphins (1981–1991) (director of personnel)

Awards and highlights
- 2× NFL champion (1958, 1959)

Career statistics
- Win–loss record: 44–44–5
- Winning %: .500
- Games: 93
- Coaching profile at Pro Football Reference

Charles H. Winner (July 2, 1924 – July 18, 2023) was an American football player and coach.

== Life and career ==
Winner was born in Somerville, New Jersey and, during World War II, flew seventeen missions in a B-17 Flying Fortress plane, spending six weeks in a German prisoner of war camp. Upon his release from the service he played running back at Washington University in St. Louis, where Weeb Ewbank was head coach. After Ewbank moved on to coach for the Cleveland Browns, Winner took an assistant position with the nearby Case Tech Rough Riders, present-day Case Western Reserve University, while also serving as a scout for the Cleveland Browns. In 1950, he married Ewbank's daughter, Nancy. When Ewbank was hired as head coach of the Baltimore Colts in 1954, Winner went along and helped the team capture NFL titles in both 1958 and 1959. At the conclusion of the 1962 NFL season, Ewbank was dismissed, but Winner stayed under new coach Don Shula from 1963 to 1965.

On February 10, 1966, Winner was hired as head coach of the St. Louis Cardinals. In five seasons at the helm, Winner managed a 35–30–5 record, but after failing to reach the postseason, he was fired on January 6, 1971. The Cardinals posted winning records in three of Winner's five seasons with the Cardinals but fell short of the playoffs each time. In 1966 the Cardinals won their first five games, but they then lost four of their last five games to finish at 8–5–1 and in fourth place in the NFL East Division. In 1968, St. Louis finished a half game behind the Cleveland Browns (9–4–1 to 10–4) in the NFL Century Division despite sweeping both regular-season meetings with the Browns. In 1970 St. Louis rolled to an 8–2–1 record at the end of November, including three consecutive shutouts over the Houston Oilers (44–0), Boston Patriots (31–0), and Dallas Cowboys (38–0, on Monday Night Football in Dallas). With the NFC East championship in sight, however, the Cardinals stumbled in December, losing to the Detroit Lions, New York Giants and Washington Redskins to finish at 8–5–1 and third place in the division behind Dallas and the Giants.

Winner was soon hired by George Allen of the Washington Redskins. Winner worked two years for the Redskins, helping them reach the NFL playoffs during each season and their first Super Bowl berth ever in 1972. On February 1, 1973, he rejoined Ewbank as an assistant with the Jets and was also designated his successor following the end of the 1973 NFL season. Winner struggled to achieve success with the Jets, finishing 7–7 in 1974, having won the last six games in a row after winning just once in the first eight. The following year saw the team win only two of the first nine games, a decline that resulted in his dismissal on November 19, three days after a 52–19 loss to the Colts.

Two months later, Winner was hired as an assistant with the Cincinnati Bengals, spending the next four years with the team before once again being fired following the 1979 NFL season. Renewing acquaintances with Don Shula in 1981, Winner was hired to serve as player personnel director for the Miami Dolphins. He spent two years in that role before shifting to pro personnel, performing many of the same duties as a general manager, especially negotiating player contracts. On June 1, 1992, he announced his retirement.

== Death ==
Winner died in Bonita Springs, Florida on July 18, 2023, at the age of 99.

== Head coaching record ==
Team	Year	Regular season					Postseason			
Team	Year	Won	Lost	Ties	Win %	Finish	Won	Lost	Win %	Result
STL	1966	8	5	1	.615	4th in NFL Eastern	-	-	-	
STL	1967	6	7	1	.462	3rd in Century Division	-	-	-	
STL	1968	9	4	1	.692	2nd in Century Division	-	-	-	
STL	1969	4	9	1	.308	3rd in Century Division	-	-	-	
STL	1970	8	5	1	.615	3rd in NFC East	-	-	-	
STL Total		35	30	5	.536		-	-	-	
NYJ	1974	7	7	0	.500	3rd in AFC East	-	-	-	
NYJ	1975	2	7	0	.222	T-4th in AFC East	-	-	-	
NYJ Total		9	14	0	.391		-	-	-	
Total		44	44	5	.500		-	-	-	
