= Jazz Jackson =

American football player (born 1952)

No. 43
- Position: Running back

Personal information
- Born: March 5, 1952 (age 74); Knoxville, Tennessee, U.S.
- Listed height: 5 ft 8 in (1.73 m)
- Listed weight: 167 lb (76 kg)

Career information
- High school: Austin-East (Knoxville)
- College: Western Kentucky
- NFL draft: 1974: 16th round, 395th overall pick

Career history
- New York Jets (1974–1976)

Career NFL statistics
- Games played: 33
- Starts: 2
- Rushing attempts: 27
- Rushing yards: 91
- Total TDs: 2
- Stats at Pro Football Reference

Clarence "Jazz" Jackson, Jr. (born March 5, 1952) is an American former professional football player who was a running back for three seasons with the New York Jets in the National Football League (NFL) from 1974 to 1976. He played college football for the Western Kentucky Hilltoppers. Jackson played 33 career games with the Jets.

Jackson was released by the Jets on November 1, 1976. He was signed as a free agent by the Cleveland Browns on June 1, 1977, but did not land a spot on the roster.
