= Carl Barzilauskas =

American football player (1951–2023)

No. 77, 75
- Position: Defensive tackle

Personal information
- Born: March 19, 1951; Waterbury, Connecticut, U.S.
- Died: December 20, 2023 (aged 72); Bloomington, Indiana, U.S.
- Listed height: 6 ft 6 in (1.98 m)
- Listed weight: 280 lb (127 kg)

Career information
- High school: John F. Kennedy (Waterbury)
- College: Indiana
- NFL draft: 1974: 1st round, 6th overall pick

Career history
- New York Jets (1974–1977); Green Bay Packers (1978–1979)

Awards and highlights
- PFWA All-Rookie Team (1974); Second-team All-Big Ten (1973)

Career NFL statistics
- Sacks: 16.5
- Fumble recoveries: 5
- Interceptions: 1
- Stats at Pro Football Reference

Carl Joseph "Barzo" Barzilauskas (March 19, 1951 – December 20, 2023) was an American professional football player who was a defensive tackle for six seasons in the National Football League (NFL) for the New York Jets and the Green Bay Packers. He played college football for the Indiana Hoosiers

After his retirement from professional football, Barzilauskas was active as the proprietor of various businesses in his adopted hometown of Bloomington, Indiana.

== Early life ==
Carl Barzilauskas was born March 19, 1951, in Waterbury, Connecticut. He attended John F. Kennedy High School in Waterbury and completed a one year enrollment at the private Cheshire Academy in that state. Although he had already grown to a height of 6'6" and a weight of 275 pounds in high school, Barzilauskas was not widely sought after by collegiate football programs — a fact which he later attributed to the weak status of his academy team.

== College career ==
He was recruited by head coach John Pont to Indiana University Bloomington, where he played defensive tackle on the Hoosiers' varsity football team from 1970 to 1973.

The 6'6" Barzilauskas was one of the most formidable defensive linemen of his era in college football. Listed at a playing weight of 265 during his 1972 junior year, opponents claimed he was bigger in the flesh. One opponent declared, "He was more like 295. I don't think I'll face a bigger man all season unless it's at Notre Dame. You line up across from him and all you see are his knuckles."

== Professional career ==
Barzilauskas was selected in the first round (sixth pick overall) by the New York Jets in the 1974 NFL draft. As such he was the third-highest professional draft pick in the history of Indiana University — status which remained true at the time of his death. Barzilauskas was also selected in the second round by New York Stars of the fledgling World Football League in that league's 1974 draft.

The attention paid by the WFL provided Barzilauskas with significant contract leverage. After the Stars signed away defensive tackle John Elliott from the Jets, the team was unwilling to take any chances. In April 1974, Barzilauskas was inked to a contract for $650,000, a record amount paid to a rookie in the NFL at that date, exceeding the landmark amount paid by the team to quarterback Joe Namath in 1965.

He was immediately thrust into the starting lineup.

Barzilauskas quickly gained a reputation for brashness as a professional rookie, declaring in one early interview that "There are certain things that have disappointed me about the NFL. One of them is the reputation of some of the players. Some of them are living off their reputations — they aren't that tough. I'm a little surprised, I thought the NFL would be tougher than it has been so far."

The 6 ft 6 in (1.98 m) defensive tackle had a successful rookie campaign in the 1974 NFL season, logging five sacks and finishing as runner up to future Hall of Famer Jack Lambert in the balloting for Defensive Rookie of the Year.

Barzilauskas played for the Jets until the trade to the Green Bay Packers on June 6, 1978, for fourth & fifth round selections (98th and 125th overall — Johnnie Lynn and Stan Blinka respectively) in the 1979 NFL draft.

Barzilauskas was bit by the injury bug during the 1979 NFL season, his final campaign. After missing time with successive knee and ankle injuries, a shoulder injury suffered in practice on October 4 forced the Packers to place him on the injured reserve list, effectively shutting him down. The injury resulted in nerve damage, with numbness extending from his neck to his fingers and leaving him unable to lift his right arm fully two months after the incident.

Barzilauskas described the disabling practice injury as "no big hit" and "a freak thing." However, he acknowledged "it will never be 100 percent, and there's a chance if I get hit again, I'd lose use of the arm forever."

"If it's over, it's over, there's nothing I can do about it," he told a New York journalist by phone from his home in Indiana. "I'd like to play again but I know I'm not going to try to go on and on if I'm going to be injured forever. It just isn't worth it."

Barzilauskas never saw game action again. His career ended after having played 70 NFL contests, during which he recorded a total of 16.5 sacks

== Life after football ==
After retiring from the NFL, Barzilauskas became deeply involved in commercial activities. Even while he was an NFL player he was proprietor of a bar in downtown Bloomington, Indiana, called Barzo's Blitz. He also established an exercise facility, Barzo's Fitness Center. He was a partner in numerous and various other business enterprises, including Realco and Small Town Properties (real estate), First Health Care and Advanced Medical, Inc. (health care), two Colorado Steakhouse franchises (food service), and A-1 Printing.

== Death and legacy ==
Barzilauskas died at a hospice in Bloomington, Indiana, on December 20, 2023, at the age of 72.

Barzilauskas was inducted into the Indiana Football Hall of Fame in 2000. He was the longtime president of the Indiana National Football League Players Association (INFLPA) and president of the Indiana chapter of the National Football Foundation.

Barzilauskas was the nephew of former NFL guard Fritz Barzilauskas, himself a high first round draft selection who played for the Boston Yanks and New York Giants from 1947 to 1951.
