= Richard Neal (American football) =

American football player (1947–1983)

No. 80, 87, 81, 68
- Positions: Defensive end, Defensive tackle

Personal information
- Born: September 27, 1947; Minden, Louisiana, U.S.
- Died: April 3, 1983 (aged 35); St. Louis, Missouri, U.S.
- Listed height: 6 ft 3 in (1.91 m)
- Listed weight: 260 lb (118 kg)

Career information
- High school: Booker T. Washington (Shreveport, Louisiana)
- College: Southern
- NFL draft: 1969: 2nd round, 45th overall pick

Career history
- New Orleans Saints (1969–1972); New York Jets (1973–1977); New Orleans Saints (1978)

Career NFL statistics
- Fumble recoveries: 13
- Sacks: 38
- Stats at Pro Football Reference

Richard Neal (September 27, 1947 - April 3, 1983) was an American football defensive end in the National Football League for the New Orleans Saints and the New York Jets. Neal played college football at Southern University. He was traded along with Delles Howell from the Saints to the Jets for a pair of 1973 picks in the second and third rounds (51st and 66th overall–Steve Baumgartner and Pete Van Valkenburg respectively) on January 29, 1973. He died of heart failure at the age of 35 in St. Louis. He was on a business trip for his company at his death.
