= David Knight (American football) =

Italian gridiron football player (born 1951)

No. 82
- Position: Wide receiver

Personal information
- Born: February 1, 1951 (age 75); Trieste, Italy
- Listed height: 6 ft 1 in (1.85 m)
- Listed weight: 182 lb (83 kg)

Career information
- High school: Mount Vernon (Alexandria, Virginia, U.S.)
- College: William & Mary
- NFL draft: 1973: 11th round, 272nd overall pick

Career history
- New York Jets (1973–1977)

Awards and highlights
- First-team All-East (1972); Second-team All-East (1971)

Career NFL statistics
- Receptions: 73
- Receiving yards: 1,189
- Touchdowns: 7
- Stats at Pro Football Reference

David Randall Knight (born February 1, 1951) is an Italian-born former professional American football player who played wide receiver for five seasons for the New York Jets in the National Football League (NFL).
