= Doug Jones (American football) =

American football player (born 1950)

No. 32, 24, 46
- Position: Safety

Personal information
- Born: May 31, 1950 (age 76); San Diego, California, U.S.
- Listed height: 6 ft 2 in (1.88 m)
- Listed weight: 202 lb (92 kg)

Career information
- High school: Lincoln (San Diego)
- College: Arizona State; Valley State
- NFL draft: 1973: 6th round, 145th overall pick

Career history
- Kansas City Chiefs (1973–1974); Buffalo Bills (1976–1978); Detroit Lions (1979)

Career NFL statistics
- Interceptions: 6
- Touchdowns: 1
- Fumble recoveries: 3
- Stats at Pro Football Reference

Douglas Charles Jones (born May 31, 1950) is an American former professional football player who was a safety for six seasons with the Kansas City Chiefs, Buffalo Bills, and the Detroit Lions in the National Football League (NFL). He played college football for the Arizona State Sun Devils and Cal State Northridge Matadors.
