= Joe Schmiesing =

American football player (born 1945)

No. 82, 84, 75, 74
- Positions: Defensive end, Defensive tackle

Personal information
- Born: April 1, 1945 (age 81); Melrose, Minnesota, U.S.
- Listed height: 6 ft 4 in (1.93 m)
- Listed weight: 245 lb (111 kg)

Career information
- High school: Sauk Centre (Sauk Centre, Minnesota)
- College: Minnesota (1964); New Mexico State (1966-1967)
- NFL draft: 1968: 4th round, 96th overall pick

Career history
- St. Louis Cardinals (1968–1971); Detroit Lions (1972); Baltimore Colts (1973); New York Jets (1974)

Career NFL statistics
- Sacks: 10
- Stats at Pro Football Reference

Joseph Frank Schmiesing (born April 1, 1945) is an American former professional football player who was a defensive lineman in the National Football League. He played college football for the New Mexico State Aggies. He played seven seasons in the NFL for the St. Louis Cardinals, Detroit Lions, Baltimore Colts, and New York Jets.
