= Ken Shipp =

American football coach (1929–2012)

Profile
- Position: Coach

Personal information
- Born: February 3, 1929; Old Hickory, Tennessee, U.S.
- Died: March 5, 2012 (aged 83); Murfreesboro, Tennessee, U.S.

Career information
- College: Middle Tennessee State

Career history
- St. Louis Cardinals (1968–1970) Receivers coach & game scouting; New Orleans Saints (1971–1972) Offensive coordinator; New York Jets (1973–1975) Offensive coordinator; New York Jets (1975) Interim head coach; Detroit Lions (1976) Offensive coordinator; Houston Oilers (1977–1978) Offensive coordinator

Head coaching record
- Career: 1–4
- Coaching profile at Pro Football Reference

Kenneth Allen Shipp (February 3, 1929 – March 5, 2012) was an American college and professional football coach. He served as an offensive coordinator and receivers coach in the National Football League (NFL) and briefly as the interim head coach of the New York Jets during the 1975 season. He assumed the job after the firing of Charley Winner, who was 2–7 on the season. The team was 1–4 under Shipp.

Shipp was noted for his sense of humor as an NFL coach. He had stints at Trinity, Florida State, Tulsa, South Carolina and Miami before entering the NFL, where he had positions with St. Louis and New Orleans. Archie Manning, whom Shipp coached in New Orleans, describes him as "a smart man and a good coach." A 1947 graduate of Middle Tennessee State University, he is the namesake of the Ken Shipp Endowed Scholarship at his alma mater as well as the Ken Shipp Scholarship Fund of the Community Foundation of Middle Tennessee.

== 1978 ==
Shipp last coached in the NFL in 1978, when he was on the staff of Bum Phillips with the Houston Oilers. Shipp had been the team's offensive coordinator since replacing King Hill in 1977, and he had butted heads with his starting quarterback Dan Pastorini during that time. During the Oilers’ Week 4 matchup against the Los Angeles Rams, with the Rams leading 10-6 in the fourth quarter and the Oilers driving to try and take the lead, Shipp sent in a deep passing play to try to move the ball deeper into Rams territory. Despite having running back Earl Campbell at his disposal, who Pastorini wanted to keep giving the ball to as he had been producing well, the quarterback chose not to overrule the coach and called the pass. It was intercepted, and the Oilers never got the ball back.

After the game, Shipp blamed Pastorini for the interception, claiming he had been the one to call the play instead of Shipp. Pastorini, infuriated, came to the practice facility the next morning and got into a loud argument with Shipp for blaming him and walked out, telling Phillips he could no longer play with Shipp and asking for a trade. Phillips sided with his quarterback and relieved Shipp of his duties shortly thereafter; in his autobiography, Pastorini cited the removal of Shipp as the turning point for the Oilers as they went 10-6 that season and advanced to the AFC Championship Game.

== Death ==
Ken Shipp died in Murfreesboro, Tennessee on March 5, 2012, aged 83.
