= Jamie Rivers (American football) =

American football player (born 1945)

No. 53, 54
- Position: Linebacker

Personal information
- Born: September 22, 1945 (age 81); Youngstown, Ohio, U.S.
- Listed height: 6 ft 2 in (1.88 m)
- Listed weight: 245 lb (111 kg)

Career information
- High school: South (Youngstown)
- College: Bowling Green (1963-1966)
- NFL draft: 1967: 5th round, 123rd overall pick

Career history
- St. Louis Cardinals (1968–1973); New York Jets (1974–1975)

Career NFL statistics
- Fumble recoveries: 6
- Interceptions: 4
- Sacks: 3.5
- Stats at Pro Football Reference

James Albert Rivers (born September 22, 1945) is an American former professional football player who was a linebacker for eight seasons in the National Football League (NFL). Rivers played college football for the Bowling Green Falcons.

Rivers was the St. Louis Cardinals fifth-round selection in the 1967 NFL/AFL draft. He started nine games in 1968 and was named the Cardinals team Rookie of the Year. Rivers played in St. Louis from 1968 to 1973. He was traded to the New York Jets in 1974 where he played his last two seasons.
