= 1975 NFL season =

American football season

Regular season
- Duration: September 21 – December 21, 1975

Playoffs
- Start date: December 27, 1975
- AFC Champions: Pittsburgh Steelers
- NFC Champions: Dallas Cowboys

Super Bowl X
- Date: January 18, 1976
- Site: Orange Bowl, Miami, Florida
- Champions: Pittsburgh Steelers

Pro Bowl
- Date: January 26, 1976
- Site: Louisiana Superdome, New Orleans

AFC teams: West, Central, East
NFC teams: West, Central, East

A game ball presented to First Lady Betty Ford

The 1975 NFL season was the 56th regular season of the National Football League.

Instead of a traditional Thanksgiving Day game hosted by the Dallas Cowboys, the league scheduled a Buffalo Bills at St. Louis Cardinals contest. This was the first season since 1966 that the Cowboys did not play on that holiday.

The playoff format was changed so that the division champions with the best regular season records were made the home teams for the divisional round, with the division champion advancing to the conference championship game with the best record hosting the title game. Previously, game sites rotated by division. The caveat stipulating that a wild card team cannot face its own division champion in the divisional round was kept in force.

The season ended with Super Bowl X when the Pittsburgh Steelers repeated as champions by defeating the Dallas Cowboys 21–17 at the Orange Bowl in Miami.

== Draft ==
The 1975 NFL draft was held from January 28 to 29, 1975, at New York City's Hilton at Rockefeller Center. With the first pick, the Atlanta Falcons selected quarterback Steve Bartkowski from the University of California.

== New officials ==
Jerry Seeman, who would go on to serve as referee for Super Bowl XXIII and Super Bowl XXV before a 10-year tenure as the NFL's Director of Officiating from 1991 to 2001, was hired as a line judge. Fred Swearingen, the referee in the 1972 Raiders-Steelers playoff game which produced the Immaculate Reception, was demoted to his former position, field judge (now back judge). Gene Barth, the line judge on Jim Tunney's crew the previous four seasons, was promoted.

== Major rule changes ==
- After a fourth down incomplete pass goes in or through the end zone, the other team will take possession at the previous line of scrimmage. Previously, it resulted in a touchback.
- The penalty for pass interference on the offensive team is reduced from 15 yards to 10.
- If there are fouls by both teams on the same play but one results in a player ejection, the penalties will offset but the player will still be ejected.
- Referees were equipped with wireless microphones to announce penalties and clarify complex or unusual rulings to both fans and the media. The NFL thus became the first professional league in North America to adopt this technology.

== Division races ==
Starting in 1970, through 2001, there were three divisions (Eastern, Central and Western) in each conference. The winners of each division, and a fourth "wild card" team based on the best non-division winner, qualified for the playoffs. The tiebreaker rules were changed to start with head-to-head competition, followed by division records, records against common records, and records in conference play.

=== National Football Conference ===
Week	Eastern		Central		Western		Wild Card	
1	4 teams	1–0–0	Detroit, Minnesota	1–0–0	4 teams	0–1–0	4 teams	1–0–0
2	Dallas, Washington	2–0–0	Detroit, Minnesota	2–0–0	Los Angeles	1–1–0	2 teams	2–0–0
3	Dallas	3–0–0	Minnesota	3–0–0	Los Angeles	2–1–0	3 teams	2–1–0
4	Dallas	4–0–0	Minnesota	4–0–0	Los Angeles	3–1–0	Washington, Detroit	3–1–0
5	Dallas	4–1–0	Minnesota	5–0–0	Los Angeles	4–1–0	St. Louis, Detroit	3–2–0
6	Dallas	5–1–0	Minnesota	6–0–0	Los Angeles	5–1–0	Washington*	4–2–0
7	Dallas*	5–2–0	Minnesota	7–0–0	Los Angeles	6–1–0	Washington*	5–2–0
8	Washington*	6–2–0	Minnesota	8–0–0	Los Angeles	6–2–0	St. Louis	6–2–0
9	St. Louis	7–2–0	Minnesota	9–0–0	Los Angeles	7–2–0	Dallas, Detroit, Washington	6–3–0
10	St. Louis	8–2–0	Minnesota	10–0–0	Los Angeles	8–2–0	Dallas	7–3–0
11	Dallas*	8–3–0	Minnesota	10–1–0	Los Angeles	9–2–0	St. Louis	8–3–0
12	St. Louis	9–3–0	Minnesota	11–1–0	Los Angeles	10–2–0	Dallas	8–4–0
13	St. Louis	10–3–0	Minnesota	11–2–0	Los Angeles	11–2–0	Dallas	9–4–0
14	St. Louis	11–3–0	Minnesota	12–2–0	Los Angeles	12–2–0	Dallas	10–4–0

=== American Football Conference ===
Week	Eastern		Central		Western		Wild Card	
1	Baltimore, Buffalo	1–0–0	3 teams	1–0–0	Denver, Oakland	1–0–0	4 teams	1–0–0
2	Buffalo	2–0–0	Cincinnati, Houston	2–0–0	Denver, Oakland	2–0–0	2 teams	2–0–0
3	Buffalo	3–0–0	Cincinnati	3–0–0	Oakland	3–0–0	5 teams	2–1–0
4	Buffalo	4–0–0	Cincinnati	4–0–0	Oakland	3–1–0	Pittsburgh*	3–1–0
5	Buffalo*	4–1–0	Cincinnati	5–0–0	Denver*	3–2–0	Pittsburgh*	4–1–0
6	Miami	5–1–0	Cincinnati	6–0–0	Oakland	4–2–0	Houston	5–1–0
7	Miami	6–1–0	Pittsburgh*	6–1–0	Oakland	5–2–0	Cincinnati*	6–1–0
8	Miami	7–1–0	Pittsburgh*	7–1–0	Oakland	5–2–0	Cincinnati*	7–1–0
9	Miami	7–2–0	Pittsburgh*	8–1–0	Oakland	7–2–0	Cincinnati*	8–1–0
10	Miami	7–3–0	Pittsburgh	9–1–0	Oakland	8–2–0	Cincinnati	8–2–0
11	Miami	8–3–0	Pittsburgh	10–1–0	Oakland	9–2–0	Cincinnati	9–2–0
12	Miami	9–3–0	Pittsburgh	11–1–0	Oakland	10–2–0	Cincinnati	10–2–0
13	Baltimore*	9–4–0	Pittsburgh	12–1–0	Oakland	10–3–0	Cincinnati	10–3–0
14	Baltimore	10–4–0	Pittsburgh	12–2–0	Oakland	11–3–0	Cincinnati	11–3–0

== Final standings ==
AFC East
	W	L	T	PCT	DIV	CONF	PF	PA	STK
^{(3)} Baltimore Colts	10	4	0	.714	6–2	8–3	395	269	W9
Miami Dolphins	10	4	0	.714	6–2	7–4	357	222	W1
Buffalo Bills	8	6	0	.571	5–3	7–4	420	355	L1
New York Jets	3	11	0	.214	2–6	3–8	258	433	L2
New England Patriots	3	11	0	.214	1–7	2–9	258	358	L6

AFC Central
	W	L	T	PCT	DIV	CONF	PF	PA	STK
^{(1)} Pittsburgh Steelers	12	2	0	.857	6–0	10–1	373	162	L1
^{(4)} Cincinnati Bengals	11	3	0	.786	3–3	8–3	340	246	W1
Houston Oilers	10	4	0	.714	2–4	7–4	293	226	W3
Cleveland Browns	3	11	0	.214	1–5	2–8	218	372	L1

AFC West
	W	L	T	PCT	DIV	CONF	PF	PA	STK
^{(2)} Oakland Raiders	11	3	0	.786	5–1	8–3	375	255	W1
Denver Broncos	6	8	0	.429	3–3	4–7	254	307	L1
Kansas City Chiefs	5	9	0	.357	3–3	3–8	282	341	L4
San Diego Chargers	2	12	0	.143	1–5	2–9	189	345	L1

NFC East
	W	L	T	PCT	DIV	CONF	PF	PA	STK
^{(3)} St. Louis Cardinals	11	3	0	.786	6–2	9–2	356	276	W3
^{(4)} Dallas Cowboys	10	4	0	.714	6–2	8–3	350	268	W2
Washington Redskins	8	6	0	.571	4–4	7–4	325	276	L2
New York Giants	5	9	0	.357	1–7	3–8	216	306	W2
Philadelphia Eagles	4	10	0	.286	3–5	4–7	225	302	W1

NFC Central
	W	L	T	PCT	DIV	CONF	PF	PA	STK
^{(1)} Minnesota Vikings	12	2	0	.857	5–1	8–2	377	180	W1
Detroit Lions	7	7	0	.500	4–2	6–5	245	262	L1
Chicago Bears	4	10	0	.286	2–4	4–7	191	379	W1
Green Bay Packers	4	10	0	.286	1–5	4–7	226	285	W1

NFC West
	W	L	T	PCT	DIV	CONF	PF	PA	STK
^{(2)} Los Angeles Rams	12	2	0	.857	5–1	9–2	312	135	W6
San Francisco 49ers	5	9	0	.357	3–3	4–7	255	286	L4
Atlanta Falcons	4	10	0	.286	3–3	3–8	240	289	L1
New Orleans Saints	2	12	0	.143	1–5	2–9	165	360	L7

=== Tiebreakers ===
- Baltimore finished ahead of Miami in the AFC East based on head-to-head sweep (2–0).
- N.Y. Jets finished ahead of New England in the AFC East based on head-to-head sweep (2–0).
- Minnesota was the top NFC playoff seed based on point rating system (Vikings were 1st in NFC in points scored and 2nd in NFC in points allowed for a combined rating of 3 while Rams were 5th in NFC in points scored and 1st in NFC in points allowed for a combined rating of 6).
- Chicago finished ahead of Green Bay in the NFC Central based on better division record (2–4 to Packers' 1–5).

== Playoffs ==
Dec 28 – Metropolitan Stadium
4	Dallas	17
Jan 4 – Los Angeles Memorial Coliseum
1	Minnesota	14
NFC
4	Dallas	37
Dec 27 – Los Angeles Memorial Coliseum
2	Los Angeles	7
NFC Championship
3	St. Louis	23
Jan 18 – Miami Orange Bowl
2	Los Angeles	35
Divisional round
N4	Dallas	17
Dec 28 – Oakland Coliseum
A1	Pittsburgh	21
Super Bowl X
4	Cincinnati	28
Jan 4 – Three Rivers Stadium
2	Oakland	31
AFC
2	Oakland	10
Dec 27 – Three Rivers Stadium
1	Pittsburgh	16
AFC Championship
3	Baltimore	10
1	Pittsburgh	28

== Awards ==
Most Valuable Player	Fran Tarkenton, quarterback, Minnesota Vikings
Coach of the Year	Ted Marchibroda, Baltimore Colts
Offensive Player of the Year	Fran Tarkenton, quarterback, Minnesota Vikings
Defensive Player of the Year	Mel Blount, cornerback, Pittsburgh Steelers
Offensive Rookie of the Year	Mike Thomas, running back, Washington Redskins
Defensive Rookie of the Year	Robert Brazile, linebacker, Houston Oilers
Man of the Year	Ken Anderson, quarterback, Cincinnati Bengals
Comeback Player of the Year	Dave Hampton, running back, Atlanta Falcons
Super Bowl Most Valuable Player	Lynn Swann, wide receiver, Pittsburgh Steelers

== Coaching changes ==
=== Offseason ===
- Atlanta Falcons: Marion Campbell began his first full season as head coach. He replaced Norm Van Brocklin, who was fired after starting the 1974 season at 2–6.
- Baltimore Colts: Ted Marchibroda joined the Colts as head coach. Howard Schnellenberger was fired after three games into the 1974 season, and General Manager Joe Thomas then served for the remainder of the season.
- Chicago Bears: Abe Gibron was fired and replaced by Jack Pardee.
- Cleveland Browns: Forrest Gregg replaced the fired Nick Skorich.
- Green Bay Packers: Dan Devine left to join the Notre Dame Fighting Irish. Former Packers quarterback Bart Starr was named to replace Devine.
- Houston Oilers: Bum Phillips replaced Sid Gillman.
- Kansas City Chiefs: Hank Stram, the team's only head coach in franchise history, was relieved of his duties. Paul Wiggin was named as the team's new head coach.

=== In-season ===
- New Orleans Saints: John North was fired after a 1–5 start to the season. Ernie Hefferle then served as interim.
- New York Jets: Charley Winner was fired nine games into the season after only posting two wins. Offensive coordinator Ken Shipp served as interim for the last five games.

== Stadium changes ==
- The home of the Atlanta Falcons, Atlanta Stadium, was renamed Atlanta–Fulton County Stadium, reflecting Fulton County as a co-owner of the stadium
- The Detroit Lions moved from Tiger Stadium to the Silverdome in Pontiac, Michigan
- The New Orleans Saints moved from Tulane Stadium to the Louisiana Superdome
- While Giants Stadium in East Rutherford, New Jersey, remained under construction, the New York Giants move from the Yale Bowl in New Haven, Connecticut, to Shea Stadium, temporarily sharing it with the Jets

== Uniform changes ==
- The Cleveland Browns switched from white to orange pants (stripe to match helmet). The face masks were changed from gray to white.
- The Denver Broncos changed face masks from gray to white.
- The Houston Oilers switched from blue to white helmets.
- The New Orleans Saints switched from gold to white pants.
- The New York Giants introduced new uniforms that featured blue jerseys, red trim, and white pants; and white jerseys, red trim, and blue pants. This new design emphasized a widen striping pattern with the accent color white. The lowercase "ny" helmet logo was replaced by a striped uppercase "NY", while the face masks were changed from gray to white.

== Television ==
This was the second year under the league's four-year broadcast contracts with ABC, CBS, and NBC to televise Monday Night Football, the NFC package, and the AFC package, respectively. CBS restored The NFL Today title for its pregame show. Brent Musburger was named as its new host, former player Irv Cross as an analyst, and former Miss America Phyllis George as one of its reporters.

NBC's pregame show GrandStand made its debut, hosted by Jack Buck (who had left CBS after the previous season) and Bryant Gumbel.
