= 1979 New York Jets season =

1979 season of NFL team New York Jets

- Owner: Leon Hess
- Head coach: Walt Michaels
- Home stadium: Shea Stadium

Results
- Record: 8–8
- Division place: 3rd AFC East
- Playoffs: Did not qualify
- Pro Bowlers: T Marvin Powell

The 1979 New York Jets season was the 20th season for the franchise and its tenth in the National Football League. It began with the team trying to improve upon its 8–8 record from 1978 under head coach Walt Michaels. The Jets again finished the season with a record of 8–8.

Matt Robinson started the season at quarterback, but was hurt and Richard Todd started 15 games at quarterback as the Jets played .500 football, posting an 8–8 record for the second straight season, finishing in third place. With the 1979 season, the Jets became one of only three non-expansion teams to not make the playoffs in the 1970s (the others being the New York Giants and New Orleans Saints). Richard Todd had a very poor season by throwing 2,660 yards, just 16 touchdowns, a whopping 22 interceptions, and completed just 51.2 percent of his passes to go with his 66.5 passer rating.

== Offseason ==
=== Draft ===
1979 New York Jets draft
Round	Pick	Player	Position	College	Notes
1	14	Marty Lyons	DT	Alabama	
2	41	Mark Gastineau *	DE	East Central	
3	68	Donald Dykes	CB	Southeastern Louisiana	
4	96	Eric Cunningham	T	Penn State	
4	98	Johnnie Lynn	CB	UCLA	
5	123	Kelly Kirchbaum	LB	Kentucky	
5	125	Stan Blinka	LB	Sam Houston State	
6	149	Bill Dufek	OG	Michigan	
7	179	Emmett King	RB	Houston	
7	187	Keith Brown	DB	Minnesota	
8	198	Marshall K. Harris	DT	TCU	
8	205	Willie Beamon	LB	Boise State	
9	232	Gordy Sprattler	RB	North Dakota State	
10	262	Steve Sybeldon	OT	North Dakota	
10	263	Ed McGlasson	C	Youngstown State	
11	288	Danny Sanders	QB	Carson-Newman	
12	314	Paul Darby	WR	Southwest Texas State	
Made roster † Pro Football Hall of Fame * Made at least one Pro Bowl during career

=== Undrafted free agents ===
1979 undrafted free agents of note
Player	Position	College
Jim Boran	Linebacker	Columbia
John Gallo	Tackle	Rutgers
Kevin Mannix	Running back	Rutgers

== Personnel ==
=== Staff ===
1979 New York Jets staff
Front office: Leon Hess – Owner; Jim Kensil – President/CEO; Mike Hickey – Director of player personnel; Jim Royer – Director of pro personnel; Carroll Huntress – Scout; Connie Carberg – Personnel assistant; Head coaches: Walt Michaels – Head coach; Offensive coaches: John Idzik – Offensive coordinator; Bob Ledbetter – Running backs; Bob Fry – Offensive line	Defensive coaches: John Mazur – Defensive coordinator; Dan Sekanovich – Defensive line; Joe Gardi – Linebackers/special teams

=== Roster ===
1979 New York Jets roster
Quarterbacks (QB): 17 Matt Robinson; 4 Pat Ryan; 14 Richard Todd; Running backs (RB): 34 Woody Bennett; 25 Scott Dierking; 21 Clark Gaines; 42 Bruce Harper; 33 Kevin Long; 44 Tom Newton; Wide receivers (WR): 84 Paul Darby; 80 Roger Farmer; 81 Derrick Gaffney; 86 Bobby Jones; Tight ends (TE): 83 Jerome Barkum; 82 Mickey Shuler	Offensive linemen (OL): 60 Dan Alexander G; 68 Eric Cunningham G; 65 Joe Fields C; 67 Ed McGlasson C; 79 Marvin Powell T; 66 Randy Rasmussen G; 61 John Roman T; 70 Stan Waldemore; 72 Chris Ward T; Defensive linemen (DL): 99 Mark Gastineau DE; 73 Joe Klecko DT; 93 Marty Lyons DE; 76 Lawrence Pillers DE; 74 Abdul Salaam DT; 71 Bob Winkel DT	Linebackers (LB): 54 Stan Blinka MLB; 51 Greg Buttle OLB; 55 Ron Crosby OLB; 63 John Hennessy OLB; 53 Mike McKibben OLB; 50 John Sullivan MLB; Defensive backs (DB): 26 Donald Dykes CB; 40 Bobby Jackson CB; 29 Johnny Lynn CB; 37 Tim Moresco FS; 22 Burgess Owens FS; 48 Ken Schroy SS; 23 Shafer Suggs SS; Special teams (ST): 1 Dave Jacobs K; 15 Chuck Ramsey P	Reserve: -- Willie Beamon LB (IR); 95 Marshall Harris DE (Left squad); 56 Larry Keller LB (IR); 57 Kelly Kirchbaum LB (IR); 5 Pat Leahy K (IR); 31 Barrett Paige RB (IR); 20 Darnell Powell RB (IR); 86 Bob Raba TE (IR); 85 Wesley Walker WR (IR); Rookies in italics

== Regular season ==
=== Schedule ===
Week	Date	Opponent	Result	Record	Venue	Attendance
1	September 2	Cleveland Browns	**L** 22–25 (OT)	0–1	Shea Stadium	48,472
2	September 9	at **New England Patriots**	**L** 3–56	0–2	Schaefer Stadium	53,113
3	September 16	Detroit Lions	**W** 31–10	1–2	Shea Stadium	49,612
4	September 23	at **Buffalo Bills**	**L** 31–46	1–3	Rich Stadium	68,731
5	September 30	**Miami Dolphins**	**W** 33–27	2–3	Shea Stadium	51,496
6	October 7	at **Baltimore Colts**	**L** 8–10	2–4	Memorial Stadium	32,142
7	October 15	Minnesota Vikings	**W** 14–7	3–4	Shea Stadium	54,479
8	October 21	Oakland Raiders	**W** 28–19	4–4	Shea Stadium	55,802
9	October 28	at Houston Oilers	**L** 24–27 (OT)	4–5	Astrodome	45,825
10	November 4	at Green Bay Packers	**W** 27–22	5–5	Lambeau Field	54,201
11	November 11	**Buffalo Bills**	**L** 12–14	5–6	Shea Stadium	50,647
12	November 18	at Chicago Bears	**L** 13–23	5–7	Soldier Field	52,635
13	November 26	at Seattle Seahawks	**L** 7–30	5–8	Kingdome	59,977
14	December 2	**Baltimore Colts**	**W** 30–17	6–8	Shea Stadium	47,744
15	December 9	**New England Patriots**	**W** 27–26	7–8	Shea Stadium	45,131
16	December 15	at **Miami Dolphins**	**W** 27–24	8–8	Miami Orange Bowl	49,915
Note: Intra-division opponents are in **bold** text.

=== Standings ===
AFC East
	W	L	T	PCT	DIV	CONF	PF	PA	STK
^{(3)} Miami Dolphins	10	6	0	.625	5–3	6–6	341	257	L1
New England Patriots	9	7	0	.563	4–4	6–6	411	326	W1
New York Jets	8	8	0	.500	4–4	5–7	337	383	W3
Buffalo Bills	7	9	0	.438	4–4	5–7	268	279	L3
Baltimore Colts	5	11	0	.313	3–5	4–10	271	351	W1

=== Week 1: vs. Cleveland Browns ===
Matt Robinson was named starting quarterback for the Jets against the Cleveland Browns but hid a thumb injury on his throwing hand from three days before the game, until swelling forced him to acknowledge the injury to an angered Walt Michaels and team president Jim Kensil. The injury was treated and Robinson had the tape taken off late in the game with the Jets leading, but a Brian Sipe drive aided by a roughing the passer call against Mark Gastineau led to a game-tying Don Cockroft field goal; forced to play in overtime, Robinson's thumb swelled again and the result was a sloppy pass that was intercepted and led to the game-winning Cockroft field goal. Michaels seethed, "You work, you plan all week, and then the kid hides an injury from you." He refused to play Robinson the rest of the season.

=== Week 2: at New England Patriots ===
The Jets were crushed 56–3 in a game where Steve Grogan of the Patriots set a club touchdown record that would stand until Tom Brady broke it in 2007.

=== Week 7: vs. Minnesota Vikings ===
In the first Monday Night Football game to be broadcast from the New York City area, the Jets beat the Minnesota Vikings 14-7 in front of a raucous crowd, many of whom showed up intoxicated and began throwing bottles onto the field. One Shea Stadium security worker described the scene as worse than the celebration that ensued after the Mets won the 1969 World Series. In all, more than 30 fans and three security guards were hurt and two people were arrested.

=== Week 13: at Seattle Seahawks ===
Seahawks cornerback Cornell Webster blocked a punt by the Jets' Chuck Ramsey, leading to a Seattle score in a 30–7 Seahawks win. Following the game Michaels called out Ramsey in front of Jets players by snarling, "I can fart farther than you can kick!"
