= NFL regular season =

Sports season

The National Football League (NFL) regular season begins on the weekend following the first Monday of September (i.e., the weekend following the Labor Day holiday) and ends in early January, after which that season's playoffs tournament begins. It consists of 272 games, with each of the NFL's 32 teams playing 17 games during an 18-week period with one "bye" week off.

Since 2012, the NFL generally schedules games in five time slots during the week. The first game of the week is played on Thursday night, kicking off at 8:15 pm ET except for the kickoff game and Thanksgiving games, which kick off at 8:20 pm. The majority of games are played on Sunday, most kicking off at 1 pm ET, with some late afternoon games starting at either 4:05 or 4:25 pm ET. Additionally, one Sunday night game is played every week at 8:20 pm ET. Finally, one or two Monday night games start at 8:15 pm ET (if two games are played one of the games will start at 7:30 pm or 9 pm). In addition to these regularly scheduled games, there are occasionally games at other times, such as a Saturday afternoon or evening, the annual Thanksgiving Day games in which two daytime Thursday games are played in addition to the normal Thursday night game, and since 2023 a Black Friday (day after Thanksgiving) afternoon game.

In place since 2006, the current broadcasting contract establishes broadcast partners for each game. The Sunday afternoon games are broadcast either on CBS or Fox. CBS has the broadcast rights for teams in the American Football Conference while Fox has the rights for teams in the National Football Conference. In games where teams from both conferences play each other, the network with the broadcast rights for the "away" team will broadcast the game. In each local television market, three Sunday afternoon games are shown. One of the two networks shows two games back-to-back in each time slot, while the other network has the right to broadcast a single game, showing one game in either time slot; the networks generally alternate weeks (but not always) when each has the right to show both games.

In addition to the regular Sunday afternoon games, there are regularly three prime time games each week (Monday night football on select weeks may have two games, along with late season Saturday night games). With the exception of the NFL Kickoff Game and the Thanksgiving night game, which are broadcast by NBC, the Thursday night game is broadcast by Amazon Prime Video. The Sunday night game is broadcast by NBC, while the Monday night game is broadcast by ESPN/ABC. The Black Friday game is also broadcast by Prime Video.

The NFL uses a strict scheduling algorithm to determine which teams play each other from year to year, based on the current division alignments and the final division standings from the previous season. The current formula has been in place since 2021, the last year that the NFL expanded its regular season. Generally, each team plays the other three teams in its own division once at home and once away, all four teams from a single division in the AFC once, all four teams from a single division in the NFC once, two additional intraconference games, and one additional interconference game.

== Game times ==
Since 1990, the majority of NFL regular-season games are played on Sundays at 1:00 pm, or around 4:05 to 4:25 pm ET (see below). The late afternoon (ET) window is usually reserved for games hosted in the Pacific Time Zone or Mountain Time Zone, plus one or more marquee contests. The current NFL television contract awards the American broadcast of these games to Fox or CBS, usually with Fox showing games where the visiting team is from the NFC, and CBS showing games where the visiting team is from the AFC. Each of these Sunday afternoon games is televised on a regional basis to a few or several areas around the country, therefore each viewer can only see a maximum of two games during each broadcast window, whereas the remaining games are exclusive to the NFL Sunday Ticket premium package.

Every Sunday of the regular season, either CBS or Fox will air two games in a doubleheader package, while the other network may show only one game (with the exception of weeks 1 and 18 in which both networks have a doubleheader). Late games scheduled to air on the network showing only one game are scheduled to start at 4:05 pm ET, while the second game of a doubleheader will kick off later at 4:25 pm; this is to reduce conflicts with 1:00 pm games that have run late.

The schedule allows for four other regular time slots, in which these games are broadcast nationally across the country:

1. One Sunday Night Football game, which has been regularly scheduled since 1987, and has aired on NBC since 2006.
2. One Monday Night Football game on most weeks, (except for three to four weeks in which one game airs exclusively on ESPN+ and three on ABC since 2022) which has been regularly scheduled since 1970, and has been appearing on ESPN since 2006. Also from 2006 to 2020, two games were on the first Monday of the season. The practice of holding a Monday night game during the last week of the season ended after the 2002 season due to low ratings and a competitive imbalance involved for potential playoff teams who would have one less day of rest before the postseason. With the expansion of the season to 18 weeks in 2021, no Week 1 MNF doubleheader was scheduled that season.
3. Since 2002, the league has also scheduled games on Thursday nights. This is in addition to the Thanksgiving Day games traditionally hosted by Detroit (since 1920) and Dallas (since 1966). Starting in 2002 the NFL Kickoff Game, traditionally hosted by the defending Super Bowl champions, has been held on the Thursday preceding the start of the rest of the games. Since 2006, additional Thursday night games have been added to the season (with the games counting as part of the "week" including the upcoming Sunday), at first only after Thanksgiving, and since 2012, during nearly every week of the season.
4. Some late season games in every season since 1970, except for 2013, have been played on Saturdays. (Note: Due to the Sports Broadcasting Act of 1961, which prevents NFL and NCAA games from being played at the same time, Saturday games are only played in December and January, after the conclusion of the NCAA regular season. The Act also prevents competition for stadiums shared between college and NFL football.)

Since the 2006 season, the NFL has used a "flexible scheduling" system for the last seven weeks of the regular season when there is a Sunday night game. In 2014, that was expanded to include weeks 5 – 17 and since 2022 to include Monday nights on weeks 12–17 and in 2023 and 2024 to include weeks 13-17 for Thursday nights. This flexible scheduling allows for regional games originally scheduled for Sunday afternoon to be moved to the marquee Sunday Night matchup, to be broadcast to a national audience instead.

== History ==
Number of regular season games per team
1935–1936	12 games
1937–1942	11 games (12 weeks)
1943–1945	10 games (12 weeks)
1946	11 games (12 weeks)
1947–1960	12 games (variable weeks)
1961–1965	14 games (14 weeks)
1966	14 games (15 weeks, odd number of teams)
1967–1977	14 games (14 weeks)
1978–1981	16 games (16 weeks)
1982	9 games (17 weeks, strike)
1983–1986	16 games (16 weeks)
1987	15 games (16 weeks, strike)
1988–1989	16 games (16 weeks)
1990–1992	16 games (17 weeks)
1993	16 games (18 weeks, additional bye week)
1994–2000	16 games (17 weeks)
2001	16 games (18 weeks, September 11 attacks)
2002–2020	16 games (17 weeks)
2021–present	17 games (18 weeks)

In its early years after 1920, the NFL did not have a set schedule, and teams played as few as one and as many as sixteen games, many against independent professional, college, or amateur teams. From 1926 through 1946, they played from eleven to fourteen games per season, depending on the number of teams in the league. From 1947 through 1960, each NFL team played 12 games per season. The American Football League began play in 1960 and introduced a balanced schedule of 14 games per team over a fifteen-week season, in which each of the eight teams played each of the other teams twice, with one bye week. Competition from the new league caused the NFL to expand and follow suit with a fourteen-game schedule in 1961.

Also in 1961, the U.S. Congress passed the Sports Broadcasting Act of 1961 in response to a court decision which ruled that the NFL's method of negotiating television broadcasting rights violated antitrust laws. The law allows the league to sell the rights to all regular season and postseason games to the networks, but prohibits the league from directly competing with high school and college football games. Since high school and college teams typically play games on Friday and Saturday, respectively, the NFL cannot hold games on those days until those seasons generally end in mid-December.

From 1961 through 1977, the NFL schedule consisted of fourteen regular season games played over fourteen weeks, except in 1966. Opening weekend typically was the weekend after Labor Day, or rarely two weekends after Labor Day. Teams played six or seven exhibition games. In 1966 (and 1960), the NFL had an odd number of franchises, so one team was idle each week.

In 1978, the league changed the schedule to include sixteen regular season games and four exhibition games. From 1978 through 1989, the sixteen games were played over sixteen weeks.

Prior to 1982, Sunday afternoon games hosted in the Central Time Zone instead primarily kicked off at 2:00 pm ET/1:00 pm local time. The home games of the then-Baltimore Colts also typically kicked off at 2:00 pm ET due to Maryland's blue laws at the time. Since 1982, Central Time Zone games have primarily started at noon CT with the rest of the 1:00 pm ET early games. Colts home games also moved to 4:00 pm ET with the rest of the late afternoon games until the team's relocation to Indianapolis in 1984. Maryland's blue laws were later modified, allowing the Baltimore Ravens to play their home games at 1:00 pm ET since their 1996 inaugural season.

In 1990, the NFL re-introduced a bye week to the schedule, which it had not had since 1966. Each team played sixteen regular season games over seventeen weeks. During the season, on a rotating basis, each team would have the weekend off. As a result, opening weekend was moved up to Labor Day weekend. The league had an odd number of teams (31) from 1999 to 2001. During that period, at least one team had to be given a bye on any given week. For the 1993 season, the league experimented with the schedule by adding a second bye week for each team, resulting in an 18-week regular season. In 2001, the September 11th attacks resulted in the league postponing its Week 2 games, leading to another 18-week season. A seventeenth regular season game was added in 2021.

Since the 2002 season, the league has scheduled a nationally televised regular season NFL Kickoff Game on the Thursday night after Labor Day, prior to the first Sunday of NFL games to kick off the season. The first one, featuring the San Francisco 49ers and the New York Giants, was held on September 5, 2002, largely to celebrate New York City's resilience in the wake of the September 11, 2001 attacks. Since 2004, the NFL has indicated that the opening game will normally be hosted by the defending Super Bowl champions as the official start of their title defense. Under this scheduling system, the earliest the regular season could begin is September 4, as it was in the 2008, 2014, and 2025 seasons, due to September 1 falling on a Monday, while the latest possible is September 10, as it was in the 2009, 2015, and 2020 seasons, and will be in the 2026 season, due to September 1 falling on a Tuesday.

== Current scheduling formula ==
POS	AFC East	AFC North	AFC South	AFC West
1st	Patriots	Steelers	Jaguars	Broncos
2nd	Bills	Ravens	Texans	Chargers
3rd	Dolphins	Bengals	Colts	Chiefs
4th	Jets	Browns	Titans	Raiders
POS	NFC East	NFC North	NFC South	NFC West
1st	Eagles	Bears	Panthers	Seahawks
2nd	Cowboys	Packers	Buccaneers	Rams
3rd	Commanders	Vikings	Falcons	49ers
4th	Giants	Lions	Saints	Cardinals

This chart of the 2025 season standings displays an application of the NFL scheduling formula. The Seahawks in 2025 (highlighted in green) finished in first place in the NFC West. Thus, in 2026, the Seahawks will play two games against each of its division rivals (highlighted in light blue), one game against each team in the NFC East and AFC West (highlighted in yellow), and one game each against the first-place finishers in the NFC North, NFC South (highlighted in orange) and AFC East (highlighted in pink).

Currently, the fourteen different opponents each team faces over the 17-game regular season schedule are set using a predetermined formula:

- Each team plays twice against each of the other three teams in its division: once at home, and once on the road (six games).
- Each team plays once against each of the four teams from a predetermined division (based on a three-year rotation) within its own conference: two at home, and two on the road (four games).
- Each team plays once against one team from the remaining two divisions within its conference that finished in the same placement in the final divisional standings in the prior season: (Note: For example, a team that finished first in the previous season will play another first-place team.) one at home, one on the road (two games).
- Each team plays once against each of the four teams from a predetermined division (based on a four-year rotation) in the other conference: two at home, and two on the road (four games).
- Each team also plays an extra interconference "17th game" against one team from the division in the other conference it played two years before that. Additionally, the opponent is decided based on where the two teams finish in their respective divisions in the previous season (Note: For example, a team that finished last in its division the previous season will play another last-place team of their respective division.) (one game).

Under this formula, all teams are guaranteed to play every other team in their own conference at least once every three years, and to play every team in the other conference at least once every four years. The formula also guarantees a similar schedule for every team in a division each season, as all four teams will play fourteen out of their seventeen games against common opponents or each other.

Non-divisional intraconference matchups can occur over consecutive years if two teams happen to finish in the same place consistently. For example, even though the Colts and Patriots are in different divisions within the same conference, the two teams played each other every season between 2003 and 2012, largely because both teams often finished in first place in their divisions each previous season. Similarly, the Jets and Browns played each other every season between 2015 and 2020 because both teams often landed in fourth place in their divisions.

Outside intradivisional matchups (each of which is played twice-yearly), the home team for each match-up is also determined by the league according to a set rotation designed to largely alternate home and away designations over successive years. This rotation was slightly adjusted in 2010 for teams playing against the NFC West and AFC West, after several east-coast teams (such as the New England Patriots and New York Jets in 2008) all had to make four cross-country trips to play games in San Diego, San Francisco, Oakland, and Seattle in one season.

Although this scheduling formula determines each of the thirty-two teams' respective opponents, the league usually does not release the final regular season schedule with specific dates and times until the spring; the NFL needs several months to coordinate the entire season schedule to align with various secondary objectives — such as accommodating scheduling conflicts, not forcing teams to play too many consecutive games at home or on the road, avoiding giving any one team significantly more rest time than their opponent, and maximizing potential TV ratings. Since 2010, in an attempt to discourage playoff-bound teams from resting their starters and playing their reserves, every regular season has ended with only divisional matchups in the final week.

== Past formulas ==
Between 1970 and the 2002 expansion to 32 teams, the league used scheduling rubrics with similarities to the present model, though they were adjusted for the number of teams and divisions.

The only time between the merger and 2002 (when the league was realigned into eight divisions of four teams each) that the league was completely "balanced" was in 1995 to 1998 (with six divisions of five teams each). When the league did not have equal numbers of teams in every division, every team's opposition could not be determined by the same means.

While teams playing against their division rivals twice each has been a tradition since 1933, when divisions were first introduced (the first standardized schedule), not all teams would play the same number of divisional games due to the imbalances noted in the preceding paragraph. For example, the AFC Central between 1999 and 2001 consisted of six teams as a partial result of the Cleveland Browns relocation controversy, requiring teams to play ten intradivision games in a 16-game schedule.

=== 1970 to 1977 ===
Following the merger, every team in the Central and West divisions of each conference would play six division games, five non-division conference games, and three interconference games, except one team in each conference who played a fourth interconference game to balance the fourteen-game schedule. Teams in the East divisions would play eight division games, three non-division conference games, and three interconference games. For each conference, four groups of opponents were set:

1. A set of three interconference opponents, who would theoretically formed a repeating cycle every thirteen seasons, with each matchup occurring three times per cycle (Note: This also applied to those teams — always from the Central or West divisions of either conference and always one per season — who played four interconference games in a season, although matchups involving these teams would have occurred more than three times every thirteen seasons.)
2. For Central and West division teams playing three interconference games: two intraconference opponents from the five-team East Division of their own conference, theoretically rotating every five seasons
3. For Central and West division teams playing four interconference games: one intraconference opponent from the five-team East Division of their own conference (Note: Theoretically, this would alter the cycle of rotating intraconference opponents to a longer cycle as the team playing four interconference games in the NFC was rotated on an eight-year cycle between all eight teams in the NFC Central and NFC West.)
4. For all East division teams: three intraconference opponents rotating on a cycle of five years or longer.

In 1976 and 1977, one interconference game was deleted from almost all teams’ schedules to make room for games against the expansion Seattle Seahawks or Tampa Bay Buccaneers, both of which played special schedules. In 1976, Seattle was a member of the NFC West and Tampa Bay was a member of the AFC West; that season, Seattle played each of the other 13 NFC teams once, Tampa Bay played each of the other 13 AFC teams once, and Seattle and Tampa Bay played each other once. In 1977, Seattle moved to the AFC West and Tampa Bay to the NFC Central; that season, Seattle played each of the other 13 AFC teams once, Tampa Bay played each of the other 13 NFC teams once, and Seattle and Tampa Bay played each other once.

=== 1978 to 1994 ===
In 1978, the NFL scheduling was substantially changed because the pre-setting of all opponents many years beforehand had produced extremely frequent large inequalities in strength of schedule. The NFL attempted to remedy this by basing non-division conference opponents upon position in the preceding season, so that most non-division conference games would be played between teams finishing in the same position during the preceding season. Unlike between 1970 and 1977, there would be no rotary schedule for non-division games within a team's own conference. However, interconference games remained based on a rotation, with most teams now playing four opponents from a division in the other conference on a three-year cycle. There was a special so-called "last place" or "fifth-place" schedule for teams who finished in last place in a five-team division. In addition to their division games, a team who finished in last place in the previous season would also primarily play the other teams who finished in last place in their respective divisions (the intraconference one would be played twice to fill a void otherwise taken by a third team that finished the same place), plus all the clubs in the four team division in their conference. An example of this is also shown to the right. Teams in a four-team division (Note: Between 1978 and 1994, the AFC Central (Bengals, Browns, Oilers and Steelers) and NFC West (Falcons, 49ers, Rams and Saints) were the two four-team divisions.) played only six divisional games, as opposed to the eight that teams in five-team divisions had played. This void would be filled by having to play against the fifth-place teams in their conference in addition to their regular scheduling, hence tying to the fifth-place schedule.

POS	AFC East	AFC Central	AFC West
1st	Bills	Bengals	Raiders
2nd	Dolphins	Oilers	Chiefs
3rd	Colts	Steelers	Seahawks
4th	Jets	Browns	Chargers
5th	Patriots		Broncos
POS	NFC East	NFC Central	NFC West
1st	Giants	Bears	49ers
2nd	Eagles	Buccaneers	Saints
3rd	Redskins	Lions	Rams
4th	Cowboys	Packers	Falcons
5th	Cardinals	Vikings	

This is an example of the formula used for determining opponents for teams that finished in last place in each of the five-team divisions between 1978 and 1994, when the league consisted of 28 teams playing 16 games each. The 1990 New England Patriots finished in last place in the AFC East. Therefore, in 1991, they played all of their division rivals (marked in blue) twice each, one game against each team in the four-team AFC Central (marked in yellow), two games against the last-place finisher in the AFC West (marked in orange), and one game each against the last-place finishers in the NFC East and NFC Central (marked in red).

During these years, teams in five-team divisions who did not finish last would not face any fifth-place team outside their division, whether or not those teams were intraconference.

This scheduling system meant that, apart from the AFC Central and NFC West, all of whose teams would regularly meet every three years, teams would not necessarily play teams outside their division on a regular basis, although teams who never finished fifth would play teams in the other conference who likewise avoided last position on the same three-season cycle.

For example, between 1970 (when the leagues merged) and 2002 (when the NFL expanded to 32 teams), the Denver Broncos and the Miami Dolphins played only six times, including a stretch where they met only once between 1976 and 1997 due to frequent fifth-place finishes by both teams and a cancelled 1987 game, while the Philadelphia Eagles and Kansas City Chiefs met just four times in the same period, not playing each other at all between 1973 and 1991.

=== 1995 to 1998 ===
When the divisions were balanced between 1995 and 1998, each team would play a home and away series against their divisional rivals (8 games), two teams from each of the other divisions within the conference (two having finished the same place, and two others determined by where they placed in the standings), and four teams from a division in the other conference by the aforementioned rotary basis. Initially, team standings would determine which team in the interconference division would not be played. The team not opposed would have the "polar opposite" place (i.e.: 1st is the polar opposite of 5th) in their division, although after 1997 all teams outside the AFC Central were scheduled to play every team in the opposite conference four times (twice at home and twice away) between 1995 and 2009. An example of this schedule can be seen to the right.

POS	AFC East	AFC Central	AFC West
1st	Patriots	Steelers	Broncos
2nd	Bills	Jaguars	Chiefs
3rd	Colts	Bengals	Chargers
4th	Dolphins	Oilers	Raiders
5th	Jets	Ravens	Seahawks
POS	NFC East	NFC Central	NFC West
1st	Cowboys	Packers	Panthers
2nd	Eagles	Vikings	49ers
3rd	Redskins	Bears	Rams
4th	Cardinals	Buccaneers	Falcons
5th	Giants	Lions	Saints

This is an example of the formula used for determining a team's opponents between 1995 and 1998, when the league consisted of six divisions of five teams each. The 1996 San Francisco 49ers finished in second place in the NFC West. Therefore, in 1997, the 49ers played all their division rivals (marked in blue) twice each, one game each against the other second-place finishers in the NFC (marked in orange), one game against one additional team in the NFC East and NFC Central (marked in red), and one game against each team in the AFC West (marked in yellow) except for the 4th-place Raiders (marked in silver).

=== Regular season expansion (2021–present) ===
Prior to the 2011 collective bargaining agreement (CBA), there had been proposals to expand the regular season schedule to 17 or 18 games per team. However, a longer regular season proposal was defeated in the 2011 labor negotiations between the owners and the players association.

One of the proposals for the 17th and 18th games was to have every team play at least one game abroad every year. Another idea put forth by Houston Texans owner Bob McNair before his death was to move the traditional regional rivalries that are currently played in the preseason (such as the Governor's Cups) into a permanent annual part of each NFL team's schedule. The NFL Players' Association opposed extending the season, largely because of injury concerns, and extending the season would require that such an extension be included in the next CBA. The collective bargaining agreement signed in 2011 maintained the sixteen-game regular season schedule.

The 2020 CBA allowed for an expansion of the regular season to seventeen games. The team owners voted in March 2021 to institute the expanded schedule beginning with the 2021 season. Each team's 17th game will match them up against an interconference opponent from a division that specified team was not going to play against before the addition of the 17th game and from the division schedule rotation from two seasons prior, with AFC teams hosting the extra games in odd-numbered years, while NFC teams host extra games in even-numbered years. Since that time, the NFL has continued to push for an 18-game regular season; however, the current CBA mandates a maximum 17-game season until its expiration in 2031. In addition, the CBA has a provision that the maximum number of international games that can be played in a season is 10 until the 2025 season.

== Scheduled division matchups ==
This chart displays the current schedule of division matchups, based on the three-year intraconference and four-year interconference rotations in place since 2002, and the additional interconference "17th game" in place since 2021.

In each year, all four teams in each division listed at the top will play one game against all four teams in both of the divisions to which it has been assigned — one from the AFC, the other from the NFC. In addition, every division is assigned to play its extra interconference game against one team from the division it played two years before.

Season	Scheduled division matchups								
Season		AFC East	AFC North	AFC South	AFC West	NFC East	NFC North	NFC South	NFC West
2026	AFC	West	South	North	East	South	East	North	West
2026	NFC	North	South	East	West	West	South	North	East
2026	17th game	NFC West	NFC East	NFC North	NFC South	AFC North	AFC South	AFC West	AFC East
2027	AFC	South	West	East	North	East	West	South	North
2027	NFC	East	West	South	North	South	West	East	North
2027	17th game	NFC South	NFC North	NFC West	NFC East	AFC West	AFC North	AFC East	AFC South
2028	AFC	North	East	West	South	North	South	West	East
2028	NFC	West	East	North	South	North	East	West	South
2028	17th game	NFC North	NFC South	NFC East	NFC West	AFC South	AFC East	AFC North	AFC West
2029	AFC	West	South	North	East	West	North	East	South
2029	NFC	South	North	West	East	West	South	North	East
2029	17th game	NFC East	NFC West	NFC South	NFC North	AFC East	AFC West	AFC South	AFC North

== Regular season games played outside the U.S. ==
To date, several NFL regular season games have been played outside the U.S. The first was the 2005 game between the Arizona Cardinals and the San Francisco 49ers, which was played in Mexico City.

In October 2006, NFL club owners approved a plan to stage up to two international regular season games per season beginning in 2007 and continuing through at least 2011. The New York Giants and the Miami Dolphins played at Wembley Stadium in London on October 28, 2007, for the first of these games. A second game in London took place on Sunday 26 October 2008, when the San Diego Chargers took on the nominal “home team” New Orleans Saints, also at Wembley. The New England Patriots were the designated visitors when they beat the Tampa Bay Buccaneers 35–7 on October 25, 2009.

The long-term plan was originally to have two international games played every year, on a 16-year rotating schedule that would guarantee that each team would get to play twice over that span: once as the home team and once as the away team. This was abandoned when the St. Louis Rams, who were co-owned with Arsenal, a prominent soccer team in London, signed a three-year agreement to be the home team in the International Series games in London. This plan has since been re-established after the Rams announced that they would not be returning to England in 2013; the Rams would return to London as host team in 2016.

Since, the NFL has announced that the Jacksonville Jaguars will play one home game a season at Wembley, up to and including 2016, later extended to 2020. Their first game, versus the San Francisco 49ers, saw the 49ers winning comfortably. A second game was played at Wembley for the first time, with the Minnesota Vikings hosting and beating the Pittsburgh Steelers. Meanwhile, a record three fixtures were announced from the 2014 season, with the Jacksonville Jaguars hosting the Dallas Cowboys, the Atlanta Falcons hosting the Detroit Lions and the Oakland Raiders hosting the Miami Dolphins at Wembley.

The Buffalo Bills played one regular season game each year from 2008 through 2013 in Toronto as part of the Bills Toronto Series; two preseason games were also played as part of the same series. Poor ticket sales, fan disgust in Buffalo and the death of Bills owner Ralph Wilson prompted the cancellation of the series in 2014.

From the 2022 season, each team will host at least one international game every eight years.

== Disruptions of the schedule ==
=== Conflicts with other sports leagues and organizations ===
From the beginnings of the NFL, some teams shared stadiums with Major League Baseball teams, with MLB teams holding leases giving them priority. The NFL was required to schedule around September baseball games. In October, this frequently resulted in NFL teams having to reschedule on short notice if the MLB team in their city made the playoffs: on some occasions, the NFL game could be moved to Saturday or Monday. The NFL would often schedule October division games so that teams would be able to swap home game dates if it appeared that the MLB playoff schedule would make a stadium unavailable to the NFL. Perhaps the most extreme case was in 1973, during a season in which the New York Jets played at Shea Stadium; the Jets were forced to play their first six games on the road, including being forced to move a home game against the Steelers from New York to Pittsburgh, because the Mets were playing in the World Series. As more MLB teams started to move into baseball-only stadiums by the 1990s and 2000s, this became less of a problem.

Since 2020, when the Raiders moved from Oakland to Las Vegas, no stadium has been shared by an MLB and NFL team. However, five NFL teams currently share a venue with a Major League Soccer team, and five share venues with college football teams:

Venue	Team	Team shared with	League
Soldier Field	Chicago Bears	Chicago Fire FC	MLS
Hard Rock Stadium	Miami Dolphins	Miami Hurricanes	Atlantic Coast Conference
Lincoln Financial Field	Philadelphia Eagles	Temple Owls	American Conference
Mercedes-Benz Stadium	Atlanta Falcons	Atlanta United FC	MLS
Bank of America Stadium	Carolina Panthers	Charlotte FC	MLS
Gillette Stadium	New England Patriots	New England Revolution	MLS
Allegiant Stadium	Las Vegas Raiders	UNLV Rebels	Mountain West Conference
Lumen Field	Seattle Seahawks	Seattle Sounders FC	MLS
Acrisure Stadium	Pittsburgh Steelers	Pittsburgh Panthers	Atlantic Coast Conference
Raymond James Stadium	Tampa Bay Buccaneers	South Florida Bulls	American Conference

However, there are still nine NFL and MLB venues that share parking lots — as such, the NFL typically schedules these teams to play on the road when their MLB counterpart is at home:

NFL franchise	MLB stadium nearby	MLB franchise
Baltimore Ravens	Oriole Park at Camden Yards	Baltimore Orioles
Cincinnati Bengals	Great American Ballpark	Cincinnati Reds
Dallas Cowboys	Globe Life Field	Texas Rangers
Detroit Lions	Comerica Park	Detroit Tigers
Kansas City Chiefs	Kauffman Stadium	Kansas City Royals
Philadelphia Eagles	Citizens Bank Park	Philadelphia Phillies
Pittsburgh Steelers	PNC Park	Pittsburgh Pirates
Seattle Seahawks	T-Mobile Park	Seattle Mariners

While both NFL and MLB teams play in downtown stadiums in Cleveland, Denver and Minneapolis, the teams do not share the same parking lots as they play in different parts of the downtown area. Therefore, it is possible for the Browns, Broncos and Vikings to play home games on the same day the Guardians, Rockies and Twins, respectively, play at home.

In 2013, the Super Bowl XLVII champion Baltimore Ravens were forced to open on the road due to their MLB counterparts, the Baltimore Orioles, being scheduled at home on the same day as the Week 1 NFL Kickoff game, and the Orioles declined to either reschedule or relocate their home game. (Note: MLB typically releases the schedule for an upcoming season prior to the end of the previous season, forcing the NFL to accommodate the scheduling needs of teams who share parking lots or stadiums with MLB teams, while MLS typically releases their season schedule well ahead of the NFL’s schedule release.)

The Super Bowl XLVIII champion Seattle Seahawks averted this conflict for the 2014 season opener, as their MLB counterparts, the Seattle Mariners, played on the road; their respective venues also share the same parking lot. The Seattle Sounders FC also played on the road during the opening week of the 2014 NFL season, assuring no scheduling conflicts. The Buffalo Bills also hosted one game a year at the Rogers Centre, which is the home of the Toronto Blue Jays, but this was only an issue in the preseason, since all such regular season games were scheduled after the end of the World Series.

=== Labor disputes ===
The 1982 and 1987 seasons were both shortened by labor disputes. The 1982 strike lasted 57 days. Weeks 3 through 10 were canceled, but an additional week was added to make a 9-game schedule; the rescheduled week consisted of 12 intradivision games and two intraconference games (Jets–Chiefs, Cowboys–Vikings). The 1982 playoff matchups were determined by conference standings only. The 1987 strike and subsequent lockout lasted 24 days but only one week of the schedule was lost. Weeks 4 through 6 were played with non-union replacement players. The rest of the season was played as originally scheduled, for a total of 15 games per team.

In the event that the 2011 season had been disrupted because of a then-ongoing labor dispute, the NFL had arranged its schedule to facilitate easier cancellations and postponements. In addition to an emergency scenario of an eight-game schedule beginning in late November, the NFL also arranged its full-length schedule such that weeks 2 and 4 had no division games and all week 3 matchups could be moved into each team's respective bye week. The league also had a contingency plan to postpone Super Bowl XLVI one week, which (assuming a full playoff schedule, but eliminating the bye-week before the Super Bowl and moving the Super Bowl back one week) would allow a 14-game schedule with all six division games for each team to be played beginning as late as October 16.

=== Natural disasters ===
Several games have been postponed or relocated because of natural disasters. In 1989, Candlestick Park was damaged by the Loma Prieta earthquake. The San Francisco 49ers would play their game on October 22, 1989, against the New England Patriots at Stanford Stadium. A few days before the start of the 2005 NFL season, the Louisiana Superdome was severely damaged by Hurricane Katrina, and much of the city of New Orleans was destroyed. The Saints' eight scheduled home games were moved to other locations, including Giants Stadium, the Alamodome in San Antonio, and Tiger Stadium on the campus of Louisiana State University. On September 14, 2008, the Houston Texans were scheduled to host the Baltimore Ravens. The game was postponed until November 9 because of Hurricane Ike (which caused some damage to Reliant Stadium) and several other changes had to be made to the schedule. On August 29, 2021, Hurricane Ida made landfall in Louisiana, causing severe damage to New Orleans; the New Orleans Saints' season opener against the Green Bay Packers, scheduled for September 12 at the Superdome, was moved to TIAA Bank Field in Jacksonville, Florida.

The Miami Dolphins have been involved in a number of games that were moved to a different time and date. A few of those games would include 1992 against the New England Patriots (Hurricane Andrew), 2004 against the Tennessee Titans (Hurricane Ivan) and the Pittsburgh Steelers (Hurricane Jeanne), 2005 against the Kansas City Chiefs (Hurricane Wilma), 2017 against the Tampa Bay Buccaneers (Hurricane Irma), and others.

The roof of the Hubert H. Humphrey Metrodome collapsed on December 12, 2010, after a severe heavy snowstorm, resulting in the stadium being unusable for the remainder of the season. The last two of the Vikings' home games had to be moved: one to Ford Field in Detroit (which also led to the game being postponed to the following Monday night) and another to TCF Bank Stadium, the University of Minnesota's college football stadium. In December 2010, a Minnesota Vikings–Philadelphia Eagles game originally scheduled for the afternoon of Sunday, December 26, a time at which it could have been successfully completed, had two weeks earlier been flexed by NBC to Sunday night and was postponed to Tuesday, December 28, due to a strong Nor'easter. In 2014, the Week 12 visit of the Jets to Buffalo was moved to Detroit (and from Sunday to Monday) due to severe snow in Western New York the previous week. A similar snowstorm occurred again in 2022, and the Bills moved their Week 11 game against the Browns to Detroit (unlike in 2014, the game was able to be played at its regularly scheduled time).

=== Other major news events ===
The American Football League, the precursor to today's American Football Conference, postponed Week 12 of the 1963 season because of the assassination of President Kennedy, on Friday, November 22. The AFL's games were made up by adding a 15th week to a 14-week schedule. The older and more established National Football League went ahead and played as scheduled on Sunday, November 24, 1963, but no games were televised.

In 2001, Week 2 of the season was postponed because of the September 11 attacks. At the end of the originally planned 17-week schedule, Week 2 games were played on Sunday, January 6 and Monday, January 7, 2002. The post-season schedule was moved back a week, including Super Bowl XXXVI (the NFL temporarily eliminated the bye week before the Super Bowl for the 2001 and 2002 seasons after moving the start of the season back a week, leaving them with no choice but to push the game back a week after the earlier postponements.)

In 2020, the league added contingencies in its schedule similar to those made for the labor dispute in 2011 in case the season had to be delayed because of the COVID-19 pandemic. Every game in Week 2 featured teams that shared the same bye week later in the season, which would have allowed these games to be made up on the teams' original byes. Weeks 3 and 4 were set up so that there were no divisional games and that every team at home in Week 3 was away in Week 4 and vice versa. This would have allowed the NFL to cancel these two weeks without eliminating any divisional games and keeping each team's home and away games balanced. These scheduling changes, along with eliminating the week off before the Super Bowl and moving the Super Bowl back three weeks, would have allowed the NFL to play a 14-game schedule beginning October 29 while still playing the Super Bowl in February.

== See also ==
- List of NFL seasons
- NFL preseason
- NFL playoffs
