= History of the Seattle Seahawks =

History of the American football team

The Seattle Seahawks are a professional American football team organized in 1976 and based in Seattle, Washington, US, that plays in the National Football League. This article details the history of the Seattle Seahawks American football club.

== Overview ==
As one of the agreed parts of the 1970 AFL–NFL Merger, the NFL began planning to expand from 26 to 28 teams. Ralph Wilson was the first to propose a team for Seattle; due to the decrepit stadium situation at War Memorial Stadium and the reluctance of Buffalo, New York officials to replace it. In early 1971, he openly threatened to move his Buffalo Bills to Seattle. Buffalo officials acquiesced and built what is now Rich Stadium in 1973, keeping the Bills in Buffalo, where they remain. Hall of fame running back Hugh McElhenny, a Seattle resident and University of Washington alumnus, signed a contract with a group called the Seattle Sea Lions in hopes of bringing an NFL franchise to the city. In anticipation, he named himself general manager of the non-existent "Seattle Kings" in May 1972, and the next year the franchise gained the backing of Edward Nixon, brother of president Richard Nixon. However, McElhenny's plan ultimately fell through.

On June 15, 1972, Seattle Professional Football Inc., a group of Seattle business and community leaders started by Herman Sarkowsky and Ned Skinner, announced its intention to acquire an NFL franchise for Seattle. Almost two years later on June 4, 1974, the NFL awarded the group an expansion franchise. On December 5, 1974, NFL Commissioner Pete Rozelle announced the official signing of the franchise agreement by Lloyd W. Nordstrom, representing the Nordstrom family as majority partners for the consortium, the cost of the franchise was $16 million. Nordstrom died of a heart attack on January 20, 1976, just months before the Seahawks played their first game; son Elmer then oversaw the team on behalf of the Nordstroms.

On March 5, 1975, John Thompson, a former University of Washington executive, was hired as the general manager of the yet-unnamed team. The nickname Seahawks was selected on June 17, 1975, after a public naming contest which drew more than 20,000 entries and over 1,700 different names. 151 people had submitted the name in the list, such as Clark McMillan and Hazel Cooke (who each received a framed piece of literature for their efforts). Five names were selected as finalists: Sockeyes, Mariners, Olympics, Evergreens, and Seahawks. Nordstrom and his group telephoned Rozelle and Jim Kensil (league executive director) for a response on the names, and their favorable reaction to Seahawks led to the use of the name for the team. The nickname was previously used by the Miami Seahawks of the All-America Football Conference (AAFC) in 1946.

Thompson recruited and hired Jack Patera, the Minnesota Vikings' defensive line coach, to be the Seahawks' first head coach. Patera, age 42, was introduced at a press conference on January 3, 1976. Thompson served as general manager for the first seven seasons, which resulted in a 39–62 (.386) record with no playoff appearances and only two non-losing seasons: 9–7 in 1978 and 1979. The expansion draft was held in late March with Seattle and the Tampa Bay Buccaneers alternating picks for 39 rounds, selecting unprotected players from the other 26 teams in the league. With the second overall pick of the 1976 NFL draft in early April, the Seahawks selected defensive tackle Steve Niehaus of Notre Dame. The team took the field for the first time on August 1 in a pre-season game against the San Francisco 49ers in the brand new Kingdome.

The Seahawks are the only NFL team to switch conferences twice. The franchise began play in 1976 in the NFC West division, but switched conferences with the Buccaneers after one season and joined the AFC West. This realignment was dictated by the league as part of the 1976 expansion plan, so that both expansion teams could play each other twice and every other NFL franchise. Between 1977 and 2002, their division rivals were Denver, San Diego, Kansas City, and Oakland/Los Angeles.

Seattle has won eleven division titles in their franchise history: two AFC West titles (1988 and 1999) and ten NFC West titles (2004, 2005, 2006, 2007, 2010, 2013, 2014, 2016, 2020 and 2025). They have won the NFC Championship Game four times in 2005, 2013, 2014, and 2025 and lost the AFC Championship Game once in 1983; as a result, they are the only team to have appeared in both the AFC and NFC Conference Championship games. The Seahawks have two Super Bowl victories in 2013 and 2025 and two losses (2005 and 2014). Prior to 2005, Seattle had the longest drought of playoff victories of any NFL team, dating back to the 1984 season. That drought was ended with a 20–10 win over the Washington Redskins in the 2005 playoffs. In 2010, the Seahawks became the first team in NFL history to win their division with a losing record (7-9) in a full season. They'd participate in the 2010 playoffs, beating the defending Super Bowl champion New Orleans Saints in the Wild Card round—a game that featured the infamous "Beast Quake" run by running back Marshawn Lynch—before losing to the Chicago Bears in the Divisional round. As of January 2025, the all-time Seahawks playoff record is 20–19.

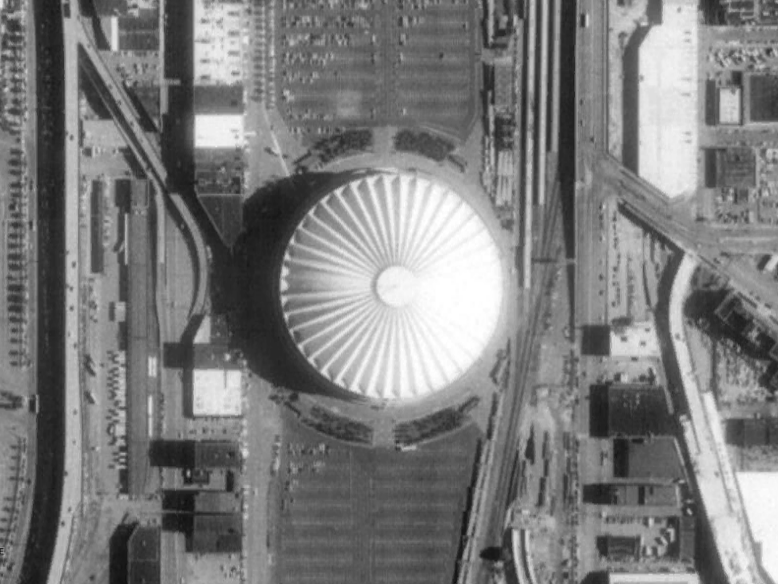
The Kingdome (1976–2000)

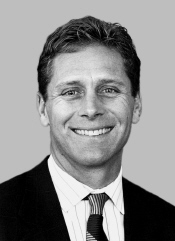
Steve Largent, Hall of Fame wide receiver for the Seattle Seahawks.

== Beginnings: 1976–1978 ==
The Seahawks had their biggest "win" before ever taking the field for a regular season game. On August 26, 1976, the Seahawks traded an eighth round pick in 1977 to the Houston Oilers for Steve Largent. The franchise's first win came on October 17 when they beat their expansion brethren Tampa Bay Buccaneers 13–10 at Tampa Bay. On November 7 they won their first game at home, 30–13 over the Atlanta Falcons. Those were the lone victories in an inaugural 2–12 season. However, the exciting play of Jim Zorn and Largent served notice of the entertainment to come.

The Seahawks hosted the 1977 Pro Bowl in the Kingdome on January 17, 1977, and a sellout crowd of 63,214 saw the AFC beat the NFC 24–14. It was the first sellout in Pro Bowl history.

In a reversal of the cunning that brought them Largent, the Seahawks traded their first round pick in 1977 to the Dallas Cowboys in exchange for a first and 3 second round draft picks. Dallas selected Tony Dorsett, who threatened to play in the Canadian Football League if he was drafted by the Seahawks, with the pick obtained from Seattle.

The 1977 season began with four straight losses before Tampa Bay came to town. The Seahawks won "Expansion Bowl II" by a score of 30–23. Two weeks later the season highlight happened on October 30 when quarterback Jim Zorn came back from missing four games with an injury to throw four touchdown passes in a 56–17 win over the Buffalo Bills at the Kingdome. The 1977 Seahawks finished with a record of 5–9, to establish a then record for wins by a second year franchise.

In 1978, the Seahawks achieved their first winning season with a 9–7 record as WR Steve Largent finished second in the NFL with 1,168 receiving yards, Jack Patera was named NFL Coach of the Year and Jim Zorn was named AFC Player of the Year by the Touchdown Club of Washington, D.C. Season highlights included becoming the first team since 1965 to sweep the Raiders (27–7 win at home and a 17–16 win in Oakland).

1979 saw the Seahawks attract a national following after their first Monday Night Football appearance on October 29, 1979. After trailing 14–0 against the Atlanta Falcons, Seattle battled back to win 31–28. A fake field goal pass from Zorn to kicker Efren Herrera led Howard Cosell to exclaim "the Seahawks are giving the nation a lesson in entertaining football!" The good vibe was short-lived, as the next week the Seahawks set an NFL record for the lowest total offense in one game (minus 7 yards) in a 24–0 loss to the Los Angeles Rams at the Kingdome. The team rebounded from that embarrassment to win 5 of their last 6 games, including a 30–7 victory over the New York Jets on MNF, to finish with a 9–7 record.

== 1979–1982: Final Patera years ==
Great hopes after consecutive wins were crushed in 1980. The Seahawks lost their last 9 games to turn a 4–3 record into a 4–12 season, losing all eight home games. The collapse did enable the Seahawks to select safety Kenny Easley out of UCLA in the first round of the 1981 draft.

In 1981, the Seahawks lost five of their first six games on their way to a 6–10 record. Steve Largent had another stellar season with 1,224 receiving yards. Dave Krieg made his first career start in place of an injured Zorn on December 6, 1981, completing 20 of 26 passes in a 27–23 win over the Jets.

In the strike-shortened season of 1982, the Seahawks fired Patera during the strike after losing their first two games. Interim coach Mike McCormack finished the rest of the season and the Seahawks compiled a 4–5 record.

== 1983–1991: The Chuck Knox era ==
=== 1983 ===
After a disappointing 1982 season (shortened due to a players' strike), the Seahawks moved interim coach Mike McCormack back into the front office and hired Chuck Knox as head coach. In 1983, the Seahawks were battling for a playoff berth with a 6–6 record when they beat the Kansas City Chiefs 51–48 at the Kingdome in week thirteen. They won two of the next three games to finish at 9–7 and earn their first playoff berth. In the wild-card playoffs, the Seahawks shut down division rival Denver and rookie quarterback John Elway 31–7.

The next week at the Orange Bowl, Seattle beat the Miami Dolphins in a dramatic fashion, coming from behind, driving 66 yards in 5 plays, ending with a dramatic Curt Warner TD run. Reserve linebacker Sam Merriman recovered a fumble on Miami's kick return to seal the 27–20 victory, defeating up-and-coming rookie quarterback Dan Marino. The Seahawks' miracle season ended in the AFC Championship Game as they lost to the eventual Super Bowl XVIII champion Los Angeles Raiders 30–14. Despite the 1983 season ending on a sour note, it was the first breakthrough season for the Seahawks. Running back Curt Warner rushed for 1449 yards, scored 14 touchdowns, and was named AFC Rookie of the Year; head coach Knox was named AFC Coach of the Year.

=== 1984 ===
The first game of 1984 was costly, as Curt Warner suffered a season ending knee injury in the 33–0 win over the Cleveland Browns, the first Opening Day win in team history. Without Warner, the "Ground Chuck" offense became "Air Knox". Led by QB Dave Krieg, the Seahawks enjoyed a then franchise record 8-game winning streak and a 12–4 record. The Seahawk defense posted 3 shutouts. One of the shutouts occurred on November 4 where they beat the Chiefs 45–0 in a game highlighted by 4 touchdowns off interception returns (still an NFL record). A season ending 2-game losing streak cost them the division title and forced a wild card game against the Raiders. The Seahawks rode running back Dan Doornink and prevailed 13–7 in the team's last playoff victory for 21 years, avenging last year's AFC Championship Game loss. The Seahawks, in turn, fell to the Super Bowl bound Miami Dolphins 31–10 in the divisional playoffs, with the Dolphins exacting revenge for their loss in the divisional playoffs at the hands of the Seahawks the previous year. Chuck Knox was named AFC Coach of the Year for a consecutive season.

=== 1985–1990 ===
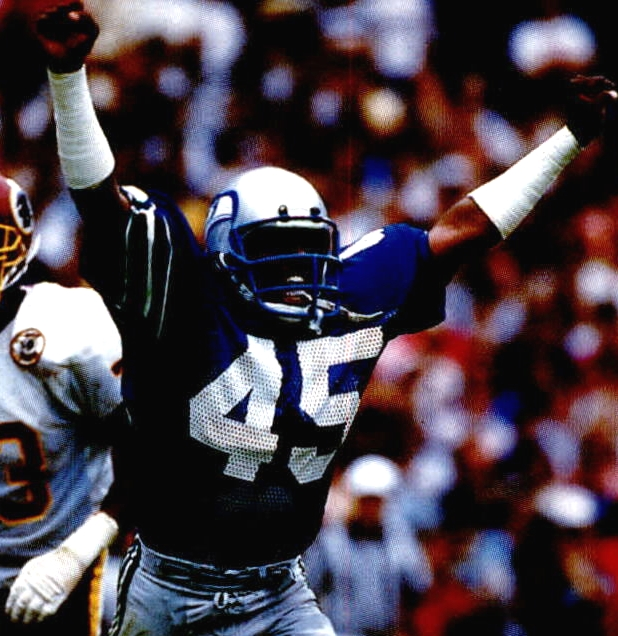
Hall of Fame safety Kenny Easley, a defensive unit leader for Seattle in the 1980s, was a top defensive player in the NFL and one of the Seahawks' all-time greatest players.

The 1985 campaign was one of the most frustrating in the team's history. Seattle went through an alternating pattern of winning two consecutive games and losing two consecutively, to end at 8–8. Quarterback Dave Krieg passed for 3,602 yards on the season. A final game loss at home to Denver was a microcosm of the season, as the Seahawks squandered an early lead and an attempt at a game-tying field goal hit the upright as time expired.

The 1986 season is generally considered one of the "ones that got away". A 5–2 start was ruined by a 4-game losing streak. Improbably, the team then went on a roll that saw them win their final 5 games in convincing fashion. Included in the run were a 31–14 road victory over the Dallas Cowboys on Thanksgiving, a 37–0 shutout of the Los Angeles Raiders on Monday Night Football and a season ending 41–16 victory over the Super Bowl bound Denver Broncos. Despite a 10–6 record, the Seahawks failed to qualify for the playoffs due to a tiebreaker. They were the only team to beat both Super Bowl teams (Denver and the New York Giants) in 1986.

1987 began with great expectations and predictions of a Super Bowl appearance. The Seahawks had won a lottery for the first pick in a supplemental draft, and they selected Oklahoma University linebacker Brian Bosworth, the 1985 and 1986 Dick Butkus award winner. The 1987 team, like Bosworth, never did live up to expectations. After an early-season 24-day labor dispute, the team qualified for the playoffs as a wild card with a 9–6 record. A 23–20 overtime loss to the Houston Oilers in the playoffs was marred by a controversial call nullifying an apparent Fredd Young interception deep in Oilers territory in the sudden-death period.

Before the 1988 season began, the team gained new ownership for the first time, as California land developer Ken Behring purchased the team from the Nordstrom family. That season, the team won its first AFC West division title, beating the Los Angeles Raiders 43–37 on the road to finish with a 9–7 record. The Seahawks lost 21–13 in the divisional playoffs to the Super Bowl bound Cincinnati Bengals. The next year, Behring named former Los Angeles Raiders head coach Tom Flores team president and general manager.

1989 saw the Seahawks fall to a 7–9 record. During the season, the overhyped and underperforming Brian Bosworth suffered a career-ending shoulder injury, and became an actor. Also retiring was wide receiver Steve Largent, the last remaining player from the team's inaugural 1976 season.

Despite a poor early-season performance in 1990, the Seahawks managed to recover and go 9–7, but were competing in a strong division and so missed the playoffs.

== 1991–1995: Turmoil and mediocrity ==
These years were the most tumultuous of the franchise's history so far. 1991 was Chuck Knox's last year as head coach of the Seahawks. After finishing with a 7–9 record, he resigned to rejoin the Los Angeles Rams. The year also saw Seattle make another bad draft choice in quarterback Dan McGwire, the brother of baseball star Mark McGwire. Widely expected to take over as starting quarterback, he struggled on the field and ultimately never got that position. The Seahawks held onto McGwire until 1995, then traded him to the Dolphins.

Team President/general manager Tom Flores assumed the head coaching duties for the 1992 season. Longtime quarterback Dave Krieg was ousted in 1992 and replaced by three different quarterbacks (first-round pick Dan McGwire, Stan Gelbaugh and Kelly Stouffer). 1992 was also the Seahawks' worst year ever when they finished 2–14 and scoring just 140 points in the regular season. The Seattle offense was historically inept, and the only bright spot for the 1992 season was defensive tackle Cortez Kennedy being declared NFL Defensive Player of the Year.

In 1993, the Seahawks drafted Rick Mirer out of the University of Notre Dame with the second pick in the draft, hoping to make him the franchise's quarterback of the future. Mirer looked to be on his way to stardom as he shared the NFL's Offensive Rookie of the Year Award with former college teammate Jerome Bettis in his first season. The honeymoon soon turned sour as his inconsistent play in the following three seasons led to several benchings and eventually his departure in a trade to the Chicago Bears following the 1996 season.

In 1994, the Seahawks temporarily moved to nearby Husky Stadium on the campus of the University of Washington for the preseason and 3 regular season games as repairs were being made to the Kingdome after an acoustic tile fell inside the stadium. Upon returning to the Kingdome, the team finished with a 6–10 record; Tom Flores was replaced as president by David Behring, son of owner Ken Behring, and as head coach by University of Miami coach Dennis Erickson. The 1995 season was only average, with the Seahawks going 8–8, following by a 7–9 campaign in 1996.

== 1996–1998: Paul Allen takes over ==
In January 1996, Seahawks owner Ken Behring announced that he was moving the franchise to Los Angeles, where the team would play at Anaheim Stadium (the same venue that the Rams had abandoned for St. Louis, Missouri the previous year). Behring claimed safety concerns (specifically the building's structural integrity in the event of an earthquake) as his reason for breaking the team's lease with King County. However, seismologists found Behring's claims to be unproven. Also, the Los Angeles area is even more earthquake-prone than Seattle. Although Behring moved the team's operations to Anaheim, his plans for a full move were scuttled when lawyers discovered that the Seahawks were locked into the Kingdome through 2005; additionally, the NFL threatened Behring with fining him $500,000 each day if he did not return the team from Southern California. Having seen his effort to permanently relocate the franchise thwarted, Behring decided to sell. A potential buyer was found in Microsoft co-founder Paul Allen, who reached an agreement to buy the club if a new stadium would be built. After funding a special statewide election for stadium financing, a new stadium for the Seahawks went forward and Allen purchased the team.

Under the new ownership, Bob Whitsitt was installed as president of the club and big-name players such as Chad Brown, Warren Moon, and Ricky Watters were brought in raising hopes in Seattle that a page had been turned. What followed instead was more mediocrity as the club in 1997 and 1998 failed to get over the .500 mark with consecutive 8-8 marks. This led to head coach Dennis Erickson ultimately being fired at the end of the 1998 season. This period was not without its memorable moments, specifically Vinny Testaverde's "Phantom Touchdown" in a regular season game, an officiating error that became a primary factor in the NFL's reinstatement of instant replay. The error resulted in a 32–31 loss to the New York Jets.

The NFL officially apologized for the officiating error. Instant replay was reinstated in the NFL the following season. Referee Phil Luckett, who headed the crew that made the touchdown call (the call itself was made by head linesman Earnie Frantz), was later reassigned at his request to back judge, and is also infamous for another controversial issue during the Thanksgiving game on November 26 between the Pittsburgh Steelers and the Detroit Lions.

== 1999–2008: The Mike Holmgren era ==
=== 1999–2001 ===
In 1999, the Seahawks made their biggest coaching hire with the appointment of Green Bay Packers head coach Mike Holmgren. Coming off his success with the Packers, Holmgren was given the dual role of general manager and head coach. The hiring brought instant credibility to the franchise as under Holmgren's guidance, the Seahawks won their second division title and first playoff berth since 1988. That year included a memorable 27–7 win over Holmgren's former team, the Green Bay Packers on Monday Night Football but despite a strong 8–2 start, the Seahawks lost 5 of their last 6 to close out the regular season 9–7. This skid continued on into the playoffs as the Seahawks lost the final game in the Kingdome 20–17 to Dan Marino and the Miami Dolphins in the AFC Wild Card round; the game was Marino's only career road playoff win.

For the 2000 and 2001 seasons the Seahawks moved to Husky Stadium while their new stadium was being built. The Seahawks drafted running back Shaun Alexander in 2000 as their running back of the future. The move to Husky Stadium could not halt the Seahawks' decline, as they finished a disappointing 6–10 in 2000.

Holmgren then traded for Green Bay Packers backup quarterback Matt Hasselbeck and made him the starting quarterback. But Hasselbeck struggled in the first half of the 2001 season compiling a 5–7 record. Hasselbeck was replaced by former Super Bowl winner Trent Dilfer who steadied the ship and led the Seahawks to a 9–7 finish and a narrow playoff miss in the team's final season in the AFC.

=== 2002: Return to the NFC West ===
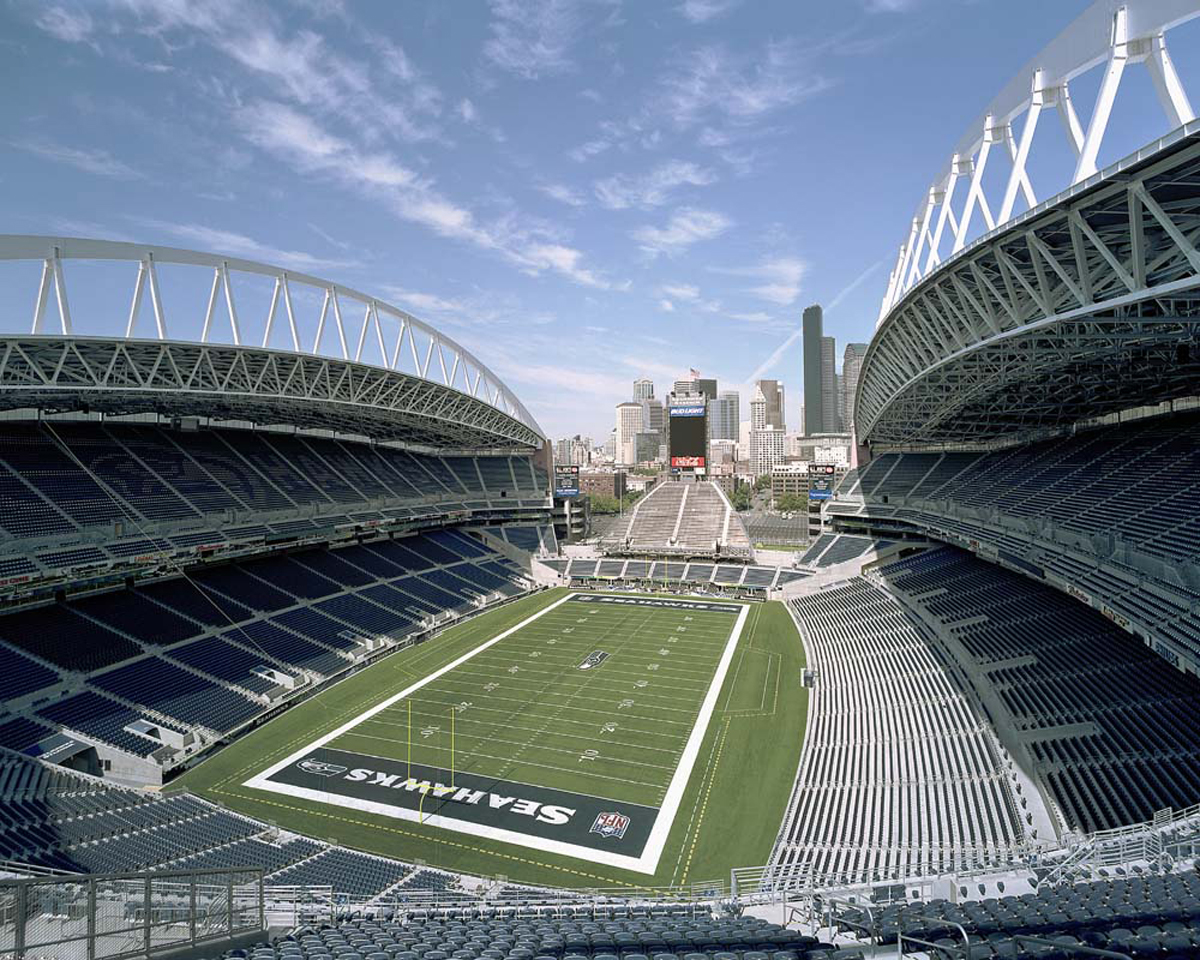
Lumen Field, home of the Seahawks since 2002.

Big changes were afoot in 2002. When the Seahawks left Husky Stadium at the end of the 2001 season they were part of the AFC West, but when they moved into Seahawks Stadium they were now part of the NFC West, where they were based in their inaugural season 26 years earlier. This was because of the 2002 divisional realignment caused by the addition of the expansion Houston Texans, and to keep traditional divisional rivalries, such as Dallas-Washington despite Dallas being further west than St. Louis. The year was one of ups-and-downs as Dilfer was injured in Week 7 and Hasselbeck became the starting quarterback. He ended the season on a 3-game winning streak, and Shaun Alexander led the NFC with 18 touchdowns. But the team finished with a 7–9 record and rumblings began over whether Holmgren was up to having dual roles as de facto general manager and head coach.

=== 2003 ===
Before the 2003 season, Holmgren relinquished his general manager duties so that he could concentrate exclusively on coaching the team. This move was especially hard for Holmgren as one of the factors for him leaving the Packers was to step out of the shadow of long-time general manager Ron Wolf. With their head coach focused solely on the coaching side, the Seahawks made the playoffs as a wild card with a 10–6 record and finished with an impressive 8–0 mark at home. The Seahawks faced Holmgren's former team, the Green Bay Packers at Lambeau Field. The Seahawks came out strong but blew several opportunities (including a crucial endzone drop by receiver Koren Robinson) and were forced to go to overtime. It was during the coin-flip where quarterback Hasselbeck made the prediction "we want the ball, and we're going to score." Unfortunately for the Seahawks, an Al Harris interception returned for a touchdown sealed their fate, as they lost 33–27.

=== 2004 ===
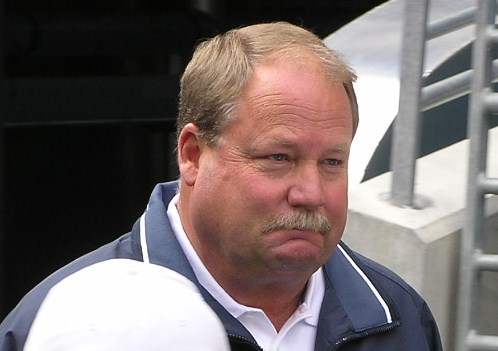
Seahawks Head Coach Mike Holmgren in 2004.

The Seahawks entered the 2004 season with lofty expectations. Publications such as Sports Illustrated predicted that the team would represent the NFC in Super Bowl XXXIX. The Seahawks started off strongly, going 3–0 including a 34–0 shutout of the lowly San Francisco 49ers at home. The season took a dramatic turn for the worse, however, when the Seahawks blew a 27–10 lead late in the fourth quarter to their division-rivals, the St. Louis Rams. Trailing 27–10 late in the fourth quarter, the Rams scored to pull within ten with 5:34 remaining on the clock. This was followed by a 41-yard touchdown pass to Kevin Curtis, making the score 27–24. After the Seahawks failed to convert on a critical third down, leaving 1:14 on the game clock, the Rams tied the game on the ensuing possession, sending the game into overtime. In the extra period, the Rams won the game on a stunning 52-yard touchdown catch by Shaun McDonald. The Seahawks never fully recovered from the shocking loss and went on to win only six of their last twelve games.

The Seahawks had another memorable fourth quarter meltdown against the Dallas Cowboys on Monday Night Football. As Seattle led 39–28 late in the fourth quarter, Vinny Testaverde completed a touchdown pass to Keyshawn Johnson, leaving 1:45 on the game clock. Jason Witten recovered the ensuing onside kick, and Julius Jones was heavily featured in the Cowboys' 57-yard drive to win the game. Jones finished with a game-high 198 rushing yards for the night.

The Seahawks won their first NFC West title with a 28–26 win over the Atlanta Falcons in the final regular season game. The team's celebrations were overshadowed by bickering between Holmgren and running back Shaun Alexander, stemming from Holmgren's decision to bench Alexander for precautionary reasons midway through the team's final game of the season. Alexander missed the 2004 rushing title by a single yard, with the honor instead going to New York Jets running back Curtis Martin. The Seahawks ended their 2004 season by losing to the St. Louis Rams 27–20 in the NFC Wild Card game, the first playoff game at Qwest Field, in what was their third loss to the Rams.

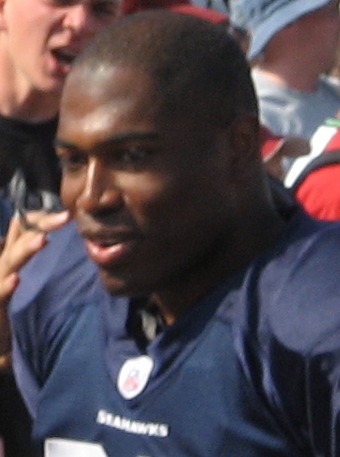
Shaun Alexander in 2006

=== 2005: First Conference Championship ===
The 2005 season saw them advance to the Super Bowl for the first time in the team's history. They were the NFC representative in Super Bowl XL, a game they lost to the Pittsburgh Steelers. The Seahawks compiled a 13–3 record in the regular season, easily winning the NFC West and clinching home field advantage in the NFC playoffs. There, they beat the Washington Redskins and Carolina Panthers to win the George Halas Trophy and advance to the Super Bowl, the first in franchise history.

==== Super Bowl XL ====
Seattle fell short in its bid for its first NFL title, losing to the Pittsburgh Steelers at Super Bowl XL in Detroit, Michigan, on February 5, 2006, by a score of 21–10. Although the Seahawks outgained the Steelers, 396 yards to 339, and led in time of possession, those differences were erased after the first quarter in which Seattle could only muster a field goal. Pittsburgh won on the strength of three big plays converted for touchdowns, including the longest run in Super Bowl history. Seattle, on the other hand, was plagued by highly questionable penalties, dropped passes, and an interception during a drive deep into Pittsburgh territory.

The controversial penalty calls made during Super Bowl XL were met with criticism from both fans and members of the media, many of whom suggested that the officials had wrongly nullified several key plays made by the Seahawks offense. Jason Whitlock encapsulated the views of a few when he wrote the day after the game, "Leavy and his crew ruined Super Bowl XL. Am I the only one who would like to hear them defend their incompetence?" In response to the criticisms, NFL spokesman Greg Aiello said in a statement, "The game was properly officiated, including, as in most NFL games, some tight plays that produced disagreement about the calls made by the officials." The game ended a playoff season that was plagued by complaints about officiating.

Seahawks head coach Mike Holmgren fueled the debate upon returning to Seattle, saying during a Seahawks rally, "We knew it was going to be tough going up against the Pittsburgh Steelers. I didn't know we were going to have to play the guys in the striped shirts as well." Al Michaels commented during a Sunday Night Football game a few months later, "The fact that Holmgren was not fined for that statement speaks volumes to me." Michaels explained he was alluding to Holmgren's need to "blow off steam", but also suggested a perceived admission by the NFL that something went wrong in that game. Both Michaels and John Madden noted Seattle's mistakes, such as poor clock management at the end of each half.

In 2010, before meeting with Seattle-area media on the new NFL rule changes, referee Bill Leavy unexpectedly apologized to the Seahawks for his mistakes in the game.

"It was a tough thing for me. I kicked two calls in the fourth quarter and I impacted the game and as an official you never want to do that. It left me with a lot of sleepless nights and I think about it constantly. I'll go to my grave wishing that I'd been better. I know that I did my best at that time, but it wasn't good enough. When we make mistakes, you got to step up and own them. It's something that all officials have to deal with, but unfortunately when you have to deal with it in the Super Bowl it's difficult."

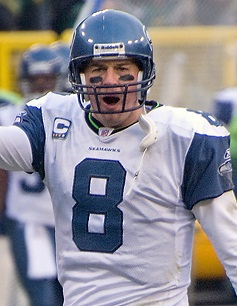
Matt Hasselbeck played as the Seahawks quarterback from 2001 to 2010 and led the team to their first Super Bowl appearance in 2005.

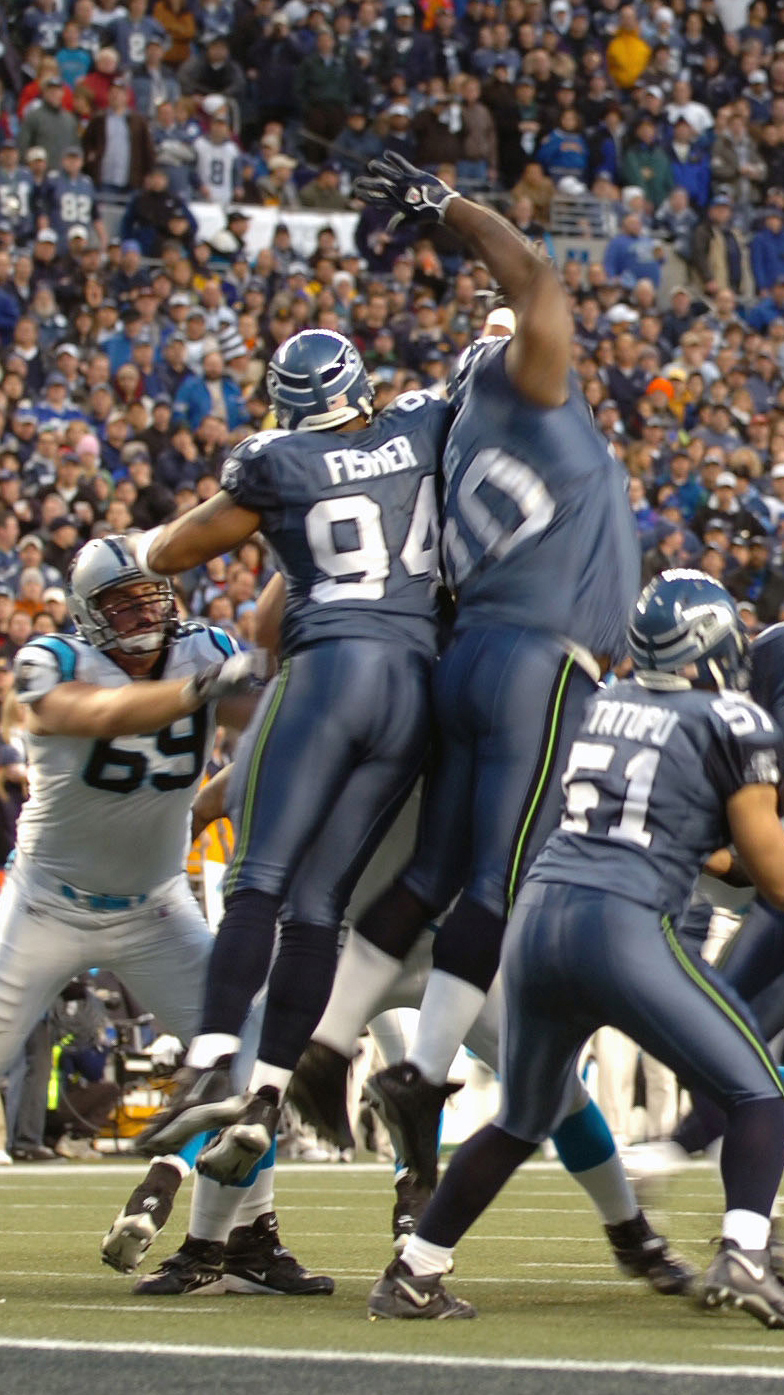
Some Seahawks block a point-after touchdown attempt by the Carolina Panthers in 2006.

=== 2006 ===
The Seahawks repeated as NFC West champions with a 9–7 record; their season included a pair of two-point wins over the St. Louis Rams and a 34–24 pounding of the Green Bay Packers on Monday Night Football. The Seahawks hosted the Dallas Cowboys in the NFC Wildcard Playoffs; trailing 20–13 the Seahawks pounced on a botched Tony Romo throw to Terry Glenn in Dallas' endzone for a safety, then scored on a 37-yard Hasselbeck touchdown. The Cowboys drove downfield but on the ensuing field goal attempt Romo (the holder) blew the snap and was stopped in his rush to the endzone. A desperate last-second Romo throw was batted down, and the Seahawks won 21–20. The Seahawks fell 27–24 in overtime to the eventual NFC champion Chicago Bears in the divisional round of the NFC playoffs.

=== 2007 ===
The Seattle Seahawks finished the regular season with a 10–6 record, winning their fourth consecutive NFC West title, and defeated the Washington Redskins 35–14 in the first round of the playoffs, to advance to an NFC Divisional Round Playoff game against the Green Bay Packers, where they were defeated 42–20.

=== 2008 ===
The Seattle Seahawks made little noise in free agency, although they did address their need for change at running back, by cutting oft-injured former league MVP Shaun Alexander and signing both speedster Julius Jones from the Dallas Cowboys and the more powerful T. J. Duckett from the Detroit Lions. A major free agency casualty was suffered, however, when kicker Josh Brown, who hit 6 last minute game winning field goals in his 5-year Seahawks career (including 4 during the 2006 season, an NFL single season record), left for the division-rival St. Louis Rams. It was also announced that this season, Holmgren's tenth as head coach, was also to be his last; defensive backs coach Jim L. Mora (the son of former New Orleans Saints and Indianapolis Colts head coach Jim E. Mora) was to replace Holmgren at season's end.

Injuries plagued the team from the very outset, with receivers Deion Branch and Bobby Engram both missing the first three games and Nate Burleson suffering a season-ending knee injury in the first game, a 34–10 loss to the Buffalo Bills. Quarterback Matt Hasselbeck was also hounded by a back injury, which forced him off the field for a total of nine games, contributing to a six-game losing streak during the second half of the season. Although the Seahawks won two of their last three games, including a 13–3 victory over the New York Jets in Holmgren's last home game at Qwest Field, the team finished third in the NFC West and end up with a record of 4–12, the worst the franchise had seen since 1992. This also marked the first time since 2002 the Seahawks missed the playoffs.

== 2009: Jim L. Mora's only season ==
The 2009 offseason began with Jim L. Mora taking over the head coaching job over Holmgren. A big splash was made in the free agency market when the Seahawks managed to land talented wide receiver T. J. Houshmandzadeh from the Cincinnati Bengals and All-Pro running back Edgerrin James from division rival Arizona. In the draft, the Seahawks used their 4th overall pick on linebacker Aaron Curry from Wake Forest University, and sought to bolster their offensive line in the second round with 49th overall pick Max Unger.

Despite an undefeated preseason record and a 28–0 shutout of the St. Louis Rams in the first week, things quickly began to unravel when Matt Hasselbeck again found himself sidelined after a hit by Patrick Willis in a Week 2 matchup against the San Francisco 49ers left him with fractured ribs. Backup Seneca Wallace went 0–2 as his replacement, including a heartbreaking 25–19 loss to the Chicago Bears in which kicker Olindo Mare missed two field goal attempts. Though they were on the fringes of the playoff hunt all the way up to Week 13, the team's season ended on four straight losses, three of which were blowouts against the Houston Texans, Tampa Bay Buccaneers and Green Bay Packers. Meanwhile, general manager Tim Ruskell resigned late in the season when he could not be guaranteed an extension at the end of the year. Though finishing with a slightly better record than the previous season at 5–11, it was not enough for Mora to save his job, as his controversial calling-out of Mare after the Chicago loss and questioning the toughness of injured first-string center Chris Spencer caused a backlash among fans, and he was fired at the end of the season to make room for new head coach Pete Carroll.

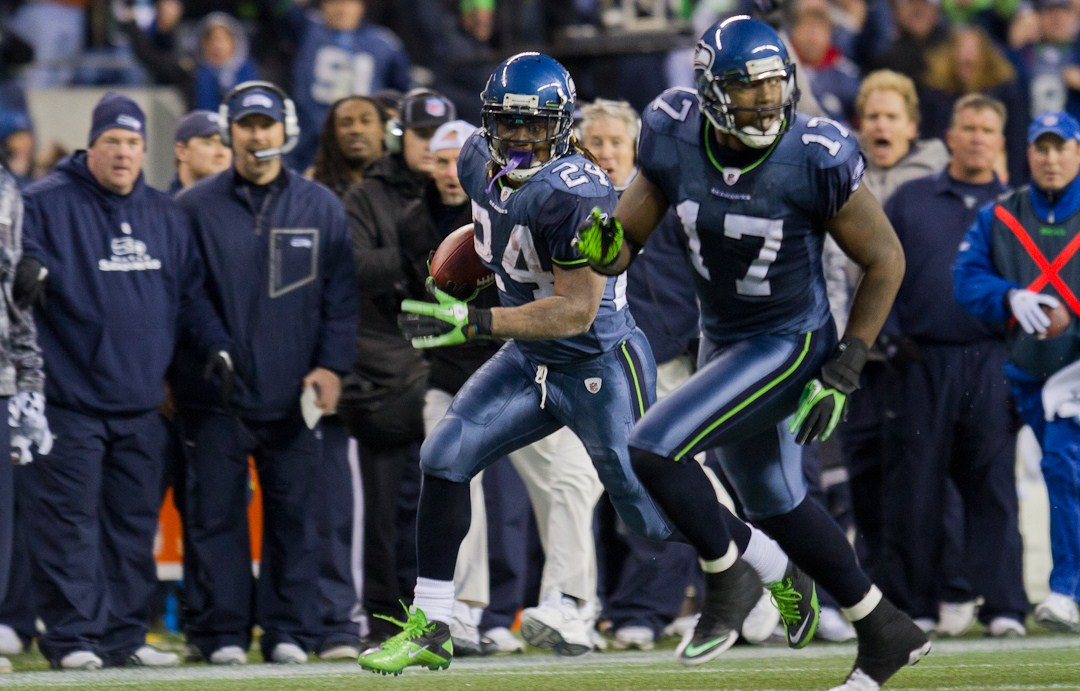
Marshawn Lynch and Mike Williams during Lynch's spectacular run

== 2010–2023: Pete Carroll era ==
=== 2010 ===
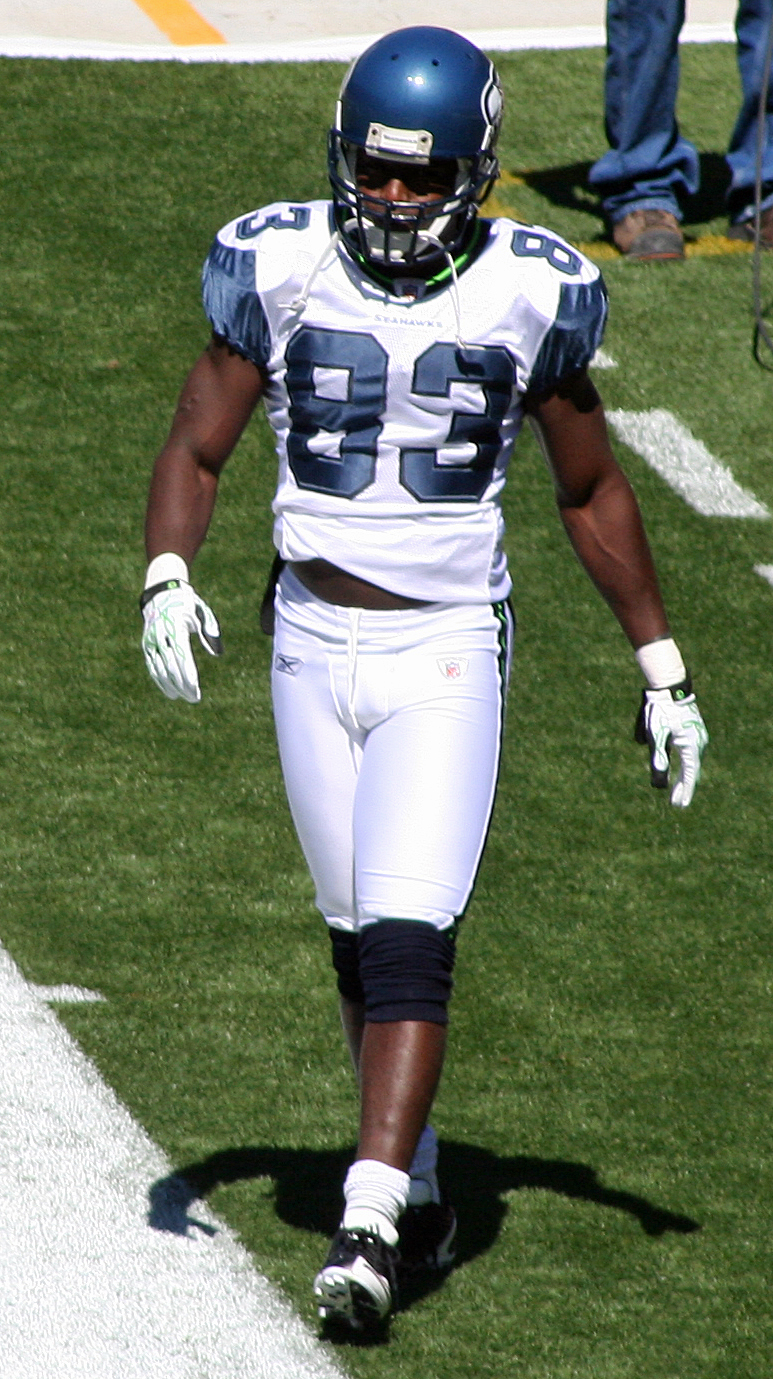
When healthy, Deion Branch was a solid receiving option for the Seahawks from 2006 to 2010.

Then-USC Trojans head coach Pete Carroll took over as the Seahawks head coach in 2010.

Thanks to a trade with the Denver Broncos the previous year, the Seahawks had two first-round picks in the draft, which they used to select left tackle Russell Okung from Oklahoma State University and safety Earl Thomas from the University of Texas. Their second-round pick was used to draft wide receiver Golden Tate from Notre Dame University. Among the many roster moves the team made included signing running back Leon Washington, defensive end Raheem Brock, and wide receiver Mike Williams; releasing wide receiver T. J. Houshmandzadeh, running back Julius Jones and fullback Owen Schmitt. The Seahawks also traded for backup quarterback Charlie Whitehurst during the offseason, and running back Marshawn Lynch in Week 5.

The team got off to a promising 4–2 start, with Seattle returning two kickoffs for touchdowns in Week 3 for a 27–20 win over the San Diego Chargers and the Seahawks defense causing six sacks of Chicago Bears quarterback Jay Cutler in a Week 5 23–20 win. The team displayed plenty of weaknesses, however, and each of their losses during the regular season was by no fewer than 15 points. Blowout losses included a two-week stretch against the Oakland Raiders and New York Giants where the team was outscored 78–10. Despite coming into the final week of the season with a 6–9 record, they were still eligible to a playoff spot thanks to the extreme weakness of the NFC West, and Whitehurst's backup performance in their regular season finale against the St. Louis Rams was enough to clinch the NFC West title with a 16–6 win, making the Seahawks the first division champion in NFL history to finish the season with a losing record.

In the playoffs' Wild Card match up, the Seahawks hosted the defending Super Bowl champion New Orleans Saints, who had previously beaten the Seahawks 34–19 in Week 11. Though they fell behind by 10 points on two separate occasions during the game, a 4-touchdown performance by Hasselbeck (two to Brandon Stokley) and an electrifying 67-yard touchdown run by Marshawn Lynch late in the game (a play which would come to be known around the league as the "Beast Quake" due to the small earthquake caused by the crowd's raucous reaction to the play) propelled the Seahawks to a stunning 41–36 upset over the Saints. It was also Hasselbeck's final home game in a Seahawks uniform, where he had played from 2001 to 2010.

The Seahawks then traveled to Chicago for a rematch with the Bears in the divisional round, but as most experts predicted, the latter won the game easily: thanks to two passing touchdowns and two rushing touchdowns by Jay Cutler, the Bears jumped out to a 21–0 halftime lead and eventually defeated the Seahawks 35–24. It marked the third time in five years that the Seahawks were eliminated in the divisional round, and the second time by the Bears.

=== 2011 ===
In 2011, the Seahawks let Hasselbeck go and made free agent acquisition Tarvaris Jackson their starting quarterback. Other notable additions included wide receiver Sidney Rice, tight end Zach Miller, and cornerback Brandon Browner, who had spent the last four years playing in the Canadian Football League. In the draft, the Seahawks' selections included linebacker K.J. Wright in the 3rd round, and cornerback Richard Sherman. They also signed rookie wide receiver Doug Baldwin as an undrafted free agent.

The Seahawks opened the season 2–6, but went on a 5–1 run as the secondary of Browner, Sherman, and 2010 draftees Kam Chancellor and Earl Thomas established a hard-hitting identity, earning the collective nickname "The Legion of Boom". Baldwin finished the season as the team's leading receiver, catching 51 passes for 788 yards and 4 touchdowns. Unfortunately, the division was much stronger than in the previous year, and team finished the season with back-to-back division losses against the San Francisco 49ers and the Arizona Cardinals. They once again finished the year 7-9, good enough this time for third place in the NFC West and out of the playoffs.

=== 2012 ===
==== Russell Wilson's rookie year ====
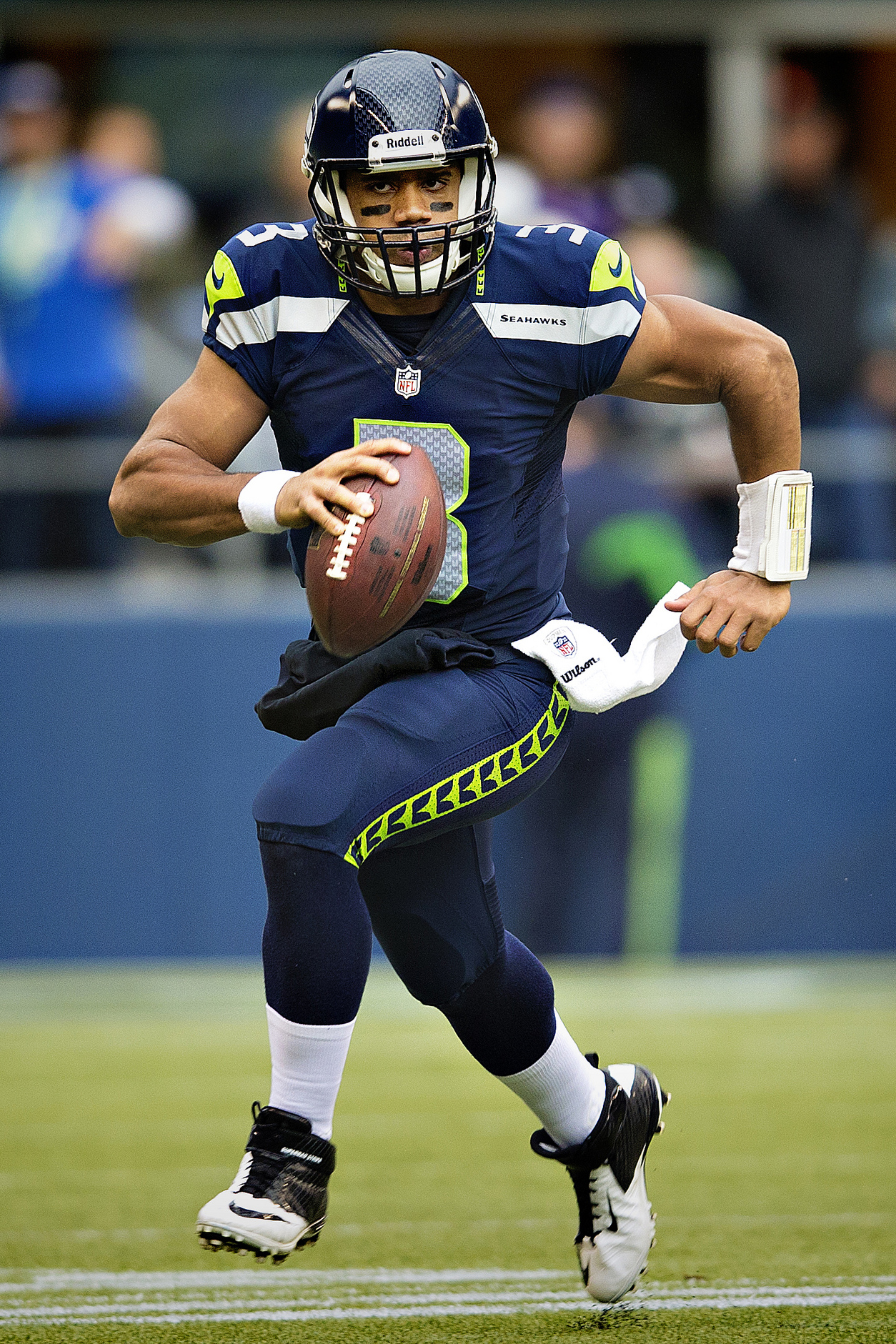
The Seahawks picked quarterback Russell Wilson in the third round of the 2012 NFL draft.

During the offseason, the Seahawks changed their logo and uniforms. The team signed former Green Bay Packers backup quarterback Matt Flynn to replace departing quarterback Tarvaris Jackson, and also drafted rookie quarterback Russell Wilson as the 75th pick in the third round of the 2012 NFL draft. Though Flynn was signed with the intention of being the starter for the 2012 season, Wilson's preseason performances were impressive enough that coach Carroll decided to name Wilson the starter for Week 1 against the Arizona Cardinals.

The season started sluggishly. The team went 2–2 in the first four games, including a controversial 14–12 Monday night win in Week 3 over the Green Bay Packers in which the sloppy officiating by replacement referees caused enough of a media outcry to convince the NFL and its Referees Association to reach a deal. Although the Seahawks reached the end of Week 12 with a middling 6–5 record, signs of a breakout by Russell Wilson were apparent in a come-from-behind victory over the New England Patriots in Week 6, and convincing wins over the Minnesota Vikings and New York Jets in consecutive weeks.

The Week 13 game on the road against the Chicago Bears was a turning point in the season for the Seahawks. Down 14–10 late in the fourth quarter, Wilson orchestrated a 97-yard touchdown drive to take the lead, and when the Bears tied the game at the end of regulation, the Seahawks drove the ball another 80 yards in the first possession of overtime to seal a 23–17 win. From there, the Seahawks went on a rampage, winning its next three games against the Arizona Cardinals, Buffalo Bills, and San Francisco 49ers by a combined score of 150–30. They finished the season with an 11–5 record and qualified for the playoffs as the Wild Card. as the 49ers' 11–4–1 record edged the Seahawks out for the NFC West title.

Their Wild Card game was played in Washington against the fourth-seeded Washington Redskins. Despite falling behind early in the first quarter by a score of 14–0, the Seahawks scored 24 unanswered points in the second and fourth quarters to win 24–14. It was their first road playoff win since 1983. They then traveled to Atlanta to play the Divisional playoff game against the top-seeded Atlanta Falcons. Once again, the Seahawks found themselves down big early, taking a 20–0 deficit to the locker room at halftime. A frantic fourth-quarter comeback allowed them to take the lead 28–27 with less than a minute to go in the game, but the Falcons were able to mount a quick drive and score a field goal with under 10 seconds left, and the Seahawks lost by the score of 30–28.

Highlights of the season include Russell Wilson starting all games for the Seahawks, becoming the first rookie quarterback since Jim Zorn in their inaugural season to do so. Wilson finished the year tying the record for touchdown passes by a rookie quarterback with 26, a record he shares with Peyton Manning. His three touchdown runs in the Week 15 game against the Bills was also a franchise record. Wilson received an invitation to the 2013 Pro Bowl, along with running back Marshawn Lynch, offensive tackle Russell Okung, center Max Unger, free safety Earl Thomas, and kick returner Leon Washington.

=== 2013: First Super Bowl Title ===
In the offseason, the Seahawks looked to bolster their pass rush through free agency, signing defensive lineman Michael Bennett from the Tampa Bay Buccaneers and Cliff Avril of the Detroit Lions. They also acquired wide receiver Percy Harvin in a trade with the Minnesota Vikings for the Seahawks' first-round draft pick in the 2013 draft. Despite not having a first-round pick, the Seahawks managed to make 11 picks in the draft, including running back Christine Michael in the 2nd round, tight end Luke Willson in the 5th round, and offensive tackle Michael Bowie in the 7th round. Departures included running back Leon Washington who was released in the offseason, and fullback Michael Robinson who was cut during training camp, but returned to the team after injuries to Derrick Coleman and Spencer Ware.

The Seahawks got out to a fast start in the regular season, winning their first four games for the first time in franchise history. Wins during this stretch included a 29-3 trouncing of the San Francisco 49ers in Week 2, and an overtime win over the Houston Texans in Week 4 in which cornerback Richard Sherman returned an interception 58 yards to tie the game late in regulation. Their first loss was a 34–28 defeat in Week 5 at the hands of the Indianapolis Colts, notable for a blocked field goal attempt by kicker Steven Hauschka that was returned by the Colts for a touchdown. Injuries to many of the starting offensive line players caused difficulties in the middle of the season, with left tackle Russell Okung and right tackle Breno Giacomini both missing long stretches of time, and although Percy Harvin dazzled the crowd with an acrobatic catch and a long punt return in the game against the Minnesota Vikings in Week 11, a nagging hip injury kept him off the field for the rest of the season. Despite these setbacks, the Seahawks managed to rattle off seven straight wins, taking control of the conference in Week 13 with a 34–7 blowout of the New Orleans Saints where the home crowd set a new Guinness World Record for the loudest outdoor stadium with a 137.6 decibel reading at one point during the game, reclaiming the record from the Kansas City Chiefs who had broken the record in Week 6. Although the Seahawks were the first team to clinch a playoff berth, losses to the 49ers and Arizona Cardinals in weeks 14 and 16 prevented them from clinching the division until the end of the season. Fortunately, the Seahawks defeated the St. Louis Rams handily in the regular season finale by a score of 27–9, clinching their second NFC West championship since Pete Carroll became head coach, as well as wrapping up homefield advantage throughout the NFC playoffs with the #1 seed.

The Seahawks' 13–3 regular season record marked the second time in franchise history that the team had won 13 regular season games (the previous time being in 2005). Other franchise milestones achieved included their best ever 12-game start (11–1), as well as the first time the team has won 11 or more games in back-to-back seasons. In addition, six Seahawks were named to the 2014 Pro Bowl as a result of their performances: quarterback Russell Wilson, running back Marshawn Lynch, center Max Unger, cornerback Richard Sherman, strong safety Kam Chancellor and free safety Earl Thomas.

Their first playoff game was played on January 11 against the New Orleans Saints, in a rematch of both the Week 13 regular season game as well as the 2010 Wild Card game. Once again, the Seahawks prevailed on the back of a late rushing touchdown by Marshawn Lynch, and staved off a furious comeback attempt by the Saints to win 23–15. On January 19, they played in the NFC Championship Game versus their division rivals, the San Francisco 49ers. Despite a fumble by Russell Wilson on the first play from scrimmage, the Seahawks kept the game close in the first half, trailing 10–3. From there, the Seahawks got a 40-yard touchdown rush from Lynch, a 35-yard touchdown reception from Jermaine Kearse, plus interceptions of 49ers quarterback Colin Kaepernick from strong safety Kam Chancellor and linebacker Malcolm Smith in the fourth quarter. The game was capped off by a dramatic defensive stand, in which the 49ers threatened to score a game-winning touchdown in the final minute. With 22 seconds left to play, however, Kaepernick's throw to receiver Michael Crabtree in the end zone was deflected by Sherman into the hands of Malcolm Smith, securing the victory for the Seahawks in a play that has since gone down in Seahawks lore as "The Tip".

The Seahawks won by a final score of 23–17, sending the Seahawks to Super Bowl XLVIII as the NFC representative, their second trip to the Super Bowl in franchise history.

==== Super Bowl XLVIII ====
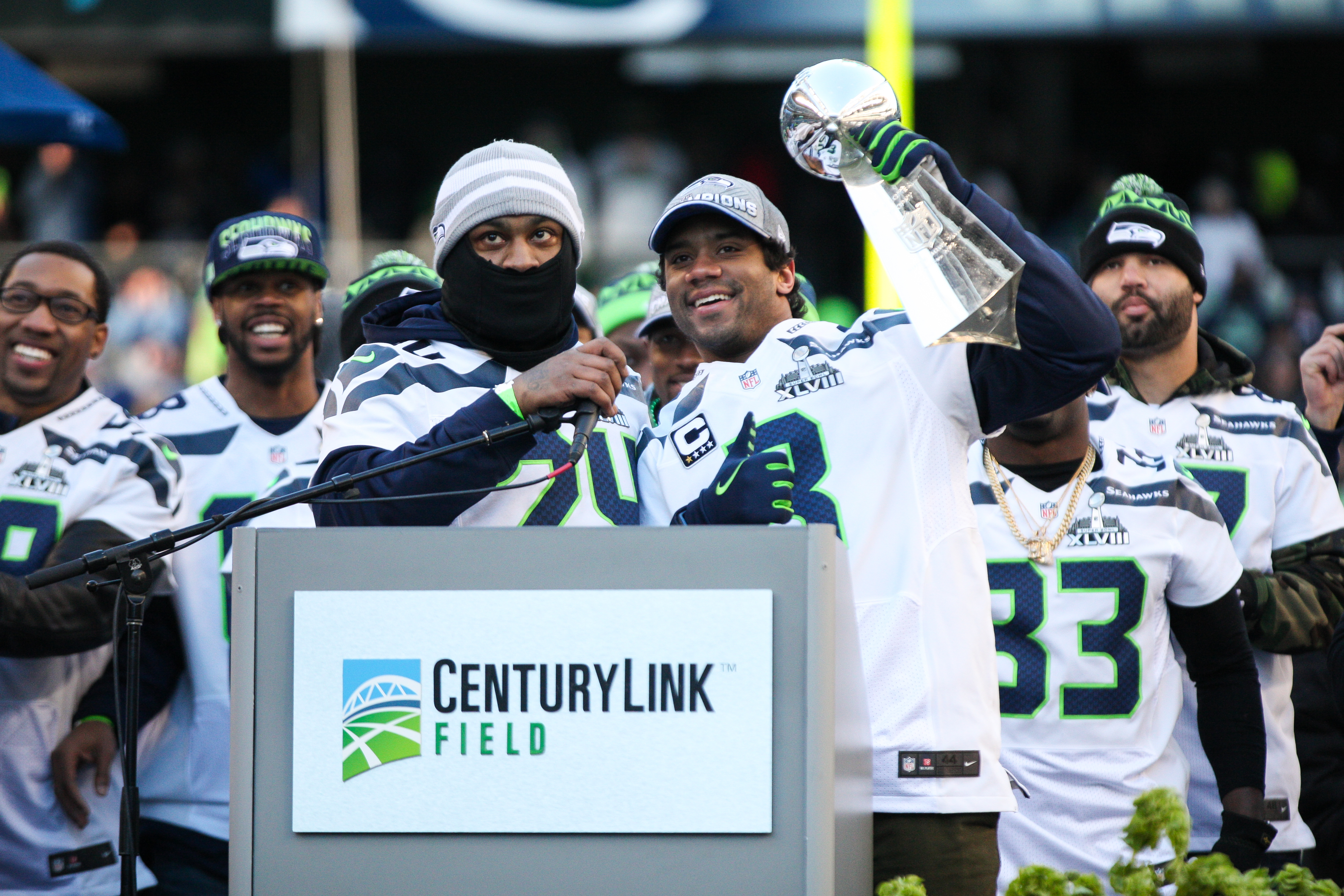
Russell Wilson and Marshawn Lynch celebrating the Super Bowl XLVIII victory at the CenturyLink Field in Seattle, February 5, 2014

On February 2, 2014, the Seahawks played in Super Bowl XLVIII against the Denver Broncos, pitting the league's #1 defense (Seattle) against the #1 offense (Denver). The Broncos offense, led by future Hall of Fame quarterback Peyton Manning, had broken a number of NFL offense records including most points scored in a single season. Leading up to the Super Bowl, many were hailing the Denver Broncos as the best offense ever to play the game. (Denver and Seattle were division rivals in the AFC West before Seattle was moved to the NFC West in 2002). After kicking off to start the first half, the Seahawks immediately benefited from a miscue by the Broncos when the first snap of the game went over the head of Peyton Manning, which went into the end zone for a safety 12 seconds into the game. Seattle added two field goals in the first quarter to take an 8–0 lead. After Kam Chancellor intercepted a pass by Manning on the following drive, the Seahawks drove the ball 37 yards capped off by a 1-yard touchdown run by Marshawn Lynch to make the score 15–0. On the very next drive, Manning was picked off yet again by Malcolm Smith, who returned the interception 69 yards for a touchdown, blowing the game wide open with a 22–0 lead that the Seahawks eventually took into the locker room for halftime.

The Seahawks received the second half kickoff, which Percy Harvin took 87 yards for yet another touchdown (12 seconds into the second half), making the Seahawks the first team to score an offensive, defensive, and special teams touchdown since the Los Angeles Raiders in Super Bowl XVIII. Russell Wilson also recorded two passing touchdowns, one to Doug Baldwin and one to Jermaine Kearse. Although the Broncos broke the shutout with a 14-yard touchdown catch by Demaryius Thomas, that was all their scoring. The Seahawks won Super Bowl XLVIII by a final score of 43–8.

The win marked the Seahawks' first Super Bowl Championship in franchise history. Russell Wilson finished with 206 passing yards and two touchdowns having won the Super Bowl in just his second year in the NFL, while the Seahawks defense logged four takeaways. Malcolm Smith was named Super Bowl MVP thanks in large part to his interception return and a fumble recovery in the second half.

Upon returning to Seattle, the Seahawks, in true fashion, put together a parade to thank their fans (The 12th Man) and their city of over 13 million Seahawks fans.

=== 2014: Second consecutive Super Bowl appearance ===
The Seahawks entered the 2014 season as defending Super Bowl champions for the first time in franchise history. However, several key players left in the offseason. Sidney Rice retired, Chris Clemons signed with the Jacksonville Jaguars, Golden Tate signed with the Detroit Lions, and Brandon Browner signed with the New England Patriots. The Seahawks were also without their first round pick in the 2014 NFL draft due to their trade for wide receiver Percy Harvin the year prior.

As reigning champs, the Seahawks hosted the annual NFL Kickoff Game, handily defeating the Green Bay Packers 36–16. However, a 30–21 loss the following week to the San Diego Chargers was a reality check, and they finished their first six games at 3–3. During this time, Percy Harvin was traded to the New York Jets due to underperformance and reports of personality clashes with teammates. A week 11 loss to the Kansas City Chiefs put the team at 6-4, three full games behind the Arizona Cardinals for the NFC West lead. But the Seahawks were able to turn the season around, winning their last six games of the season to catch a swooning Cardinals team and finish 12-4, one game ahead of Arizona. During this winning streak, the Seahawks decisively won the prime-time rematch of the previous year's NFC Championship game against the San Francisco 49ers at Levi's Stadium in Santa Clara, California by a score of 19–3, a game in which cornerback Richard Sherman intercepted two passes from 49ers quarterback Colin Kaepernick.

Russell Wilson finished the year completing 63% of his passes for 3,475 yards, notching 20 touchdown passes versus seven interceptions. Marshawn Lynch had 1,306 yards rushing and 13 rushing touchdowns. Doug Baldwin was the team's leading receiver with 66 receptions for 825 yards and three touchdowns.

By virtue of having the #1 seed in the playoffs, the Seahawks earned a first-round bye and home-field advantage throughout the playoffs. In the Divisional Round, they hosted the Carolina Panthers, who were only the second team in league history to win their division and a playoff with a losing record (the first being the Seahawks in 2010). The Seahawks took a 14–7 lead in the second quarter and never looked back, winning 31–17. Kam Chancellor intercepted a pass from Cam Newton and returned it 88 yards for a touchdown to seal the victory.

The following week, they hosted the Packers again, as they had to begin the season. But a plague of miscues including a fumbled kickoff return by Doug Baldwin and four interceptions by Russell Wilson put the Seahawks on their heels, and they were shut out in the first half by a score of 16–0. The Seahawks successfully pulled off a fake punt to score a touchdown thrown by punter Jon Ryan to offensive lineman Garry Gilliam, but Wilson's fourth interception led to a Packers field goal that put them behind 19–7 with 4:07 left to play. The Seahawks drove down the field to score a touchdown with 2:09 remaining to close the deficit to 19-14, and after an improbable onside kick recovery and a 24-yard touchdown run from Marshawn Lynch, followed by a successful 2-point conversion to tight end Luke Willson, the Seahawks had managed to take a 22–19 lead with 1:25 left on the clock. The Packers were able to kick a field goal to tie the game in regulation, but the Seahawks won the coin toss to begin overtime, and Wilson connected on a 35-yard pass to Jermaine Kearse in the end zone to cap the unlikely comeback and win the Seahawks' second consecutive NFC title by a final score of 28–22.

The Seahawks' back-to-back conference championship wins made them the first team since the 2004 New England Patriots to reach consecutive Super Bowls. They also became the first NFC team since the 1997 Green Bay Packers to repeat as NFC Champions, the first team to go to consecutive Super Bowls as the #1 seed in the playoffs since the 1990–1991 Buffalo Bills, and the first NFC team to go to consecutive Super Bowls as the #1 seed in the playoffs since the 1982–1983 Washington Redskins.

==== Super Bowl XLIX ====
On Sunday, February 1, 2015, in Super Bowl XLIX, the Seahawks faced off against Tom Brady and the New England Patriots, seeking to become the first team to win two consecutive Super Bowls since the Patriots themselves won Super Bowl XXXVIII and Super Bowl XXXIX following the 2003 and 2004 seasons, respectively.

Bad injury luck plagued the Seahawks before the game even began. Kam Chancellor tore his medial collateral ligament in practice the day before, and had to play the game in a knee brace. During the game, cornerback Jeremy Lane suffered a compound arm fracture and torn anterior cruciate ligament after returning an interception by Brady. Cliff Avril left the game in the second half with a concussion.

Though leading 24–14 with less than 13 minutes left in the game, the Seahawks' depleted defense began to show signs of weakness. Patriots wide receiver Julian Edelman became Brady's primary target, and the Patriots scored 14 unanswered points in the fourth quarter to take a 28-24 lead with 2:02 remaining. The Seahawks began driving to retake the lead late in the game, and a juggling catch by Jermaine Kearse advanced the Seahawks to the New England 5-yard line. With only one timeout remaining, and a run by Marshawn Lynch taking the offense to the 1-yard line, the Seahawks attempted a slant pass to Ricardo Lockette in the end zone. But former Seahawk Brandon Browner successfully blocked Lockette off his route, and the pass was intercepted by Patriots cornerback Malcolm Butler. Although the Patriots were pinned at their own 1-yard line, an encroachment penalty by Seahawks defensive end Michael Bennett effectively ended any chances of the Seahawks getting the ball back, and the Seahawks ultimately lost 28–24.

The Seahawks became the first team to blow a double-digit lead in the fourth quarter of the Super Bowl. The interception at the end immediately became the most iconic play of the game, and the decision to attempt a pass instead of running the ball at the 1-yard line was roundly criticized by players and analysts alike. The Seattle Times called the play "the Worst Call in Super Bowl history". In hindsight, the play call has garnered its defenders; with some arguing that the lack of timeouts required at least one pass play to be called, and that the Patriots were expecting a run in this situation. Nonetheless, NFL.com ranked the interception the #5 greatest play of all time.

=== 2015: The quest for a fourth Super Bowl appearance ===
The 2015 season marked the 40th season of play for the Seahawks.

Prior to the 2015 draft, the Seahawks made a blockbuster trade with the New Orleans Saints, trading Seattle's first-round pick for All-Pro Saints tight end Jimmy Graham. For this reason, the Seahawks did not have a first-round pick, but did make a total of eight picks in the draft, including defensive end Frank Clark in the second round, wide receiver and return specialist Tyler Lockett in the third round. Among the major free agency signings made by the team included cornerback Cary Williams, who replaced outgoing corner Walter Thurmond who had signed with the Philadelphia Eagles.

The season began with two consecutive road losses. Despite taking a 31–24 lead late in the fourth quarter against the St. Louis Rams, a defensive breakdown allowed a touchdown by the Rams in the final minute, and the Rams prevailed in overtime 34–31. The following week, the Seahawks traveled to Green Bay to face the Green Bay Packers, and lost 27–17, their first loss by double digits in 59 regular season games (67 games including the postseason). However, the team righted the ship with two straight wins against the hapless Chicago Bears and the Detroit Lions on Monday Night Football—the latter win ending controversially when a last-second play by Lions receiver Calvin Johnson was fumbled at the 1-yard line and linebacker KJ Wright batted the ball out of the back of the end zone. Although this could have been ruled a penalty against the Seahawks, which would have given possession to the Lions at the 1/2-yard line, no penalty was called.

The Seahawks struggled for much of the year. They lost their next two games against the Cincinnati Bengals and the Carolina Panthers, blowing leads of 17 and 9 points against each opponent. Two straight wins against the San Francisco 49ers and the Dallas Cowboys followed, although the Cowboys game was marred by a serious and eventually career-ending neck injury to Seahawks receiver Ricardo Lockette. A loss to the division-leading Arizona Cardinals followed, after which was another win against the 49ers which was highlighted by rookie running back Thomas Rawls piling up 209 rushing yards in relief for an ailing Marshawn Lynch, who was sidelined for several games with a back injury.

In week 12, the Seahawks faced the Pittsburgh Steelers for the third time since losing to them in Super Bowl XL. The game ended up being an offensive shootout, and a late touchdown by Doug Baldwin sealed a 39–30 victory, getting them over .500 for the first time in 2015. It was their first win against the Steelers since 2003. However, the team suffered another devastating injury as Jimmy Graham suffered a broken patella early in the game, and was lost for the year.

The Seahawks regained their stride during the homestretch, finishing the year 4–1, the one loss being in Week 16 against the Rams, who swept the Seahawks in the regular season for the first time since 2004. They finished the year 10–6, good enough for second place in the division (Arizona won the NFC West with a 13–3 record, earning the #2 seed) and earning the #6 seed in the NFC Playoffs. Also worth noting was that the Seahawks overall team record rose above .500 for the first time in franchise history; their Week 14 win against the Baltimore Ravens brought the record to 313–312–0.

The Seahawks began their postseason run by traveling to Minnesota to face the Vikings in the wild card round, in one of the coldest games in NFL history, as the temperature on the field at game time was −6 °F (−21 °C). Minnesota held the Seahawks scoreless until the fourth quarter, but could not reach the end zone themselves and had to settle for field goals the whole game. The Seahawks managed to score a touchdown and a field goal deep in the fourth quarter to take a 10–9 lead, but the Vikings seemed poised to score a fourth field goal and win until Vikings kicker Blair Walsh missed a 27-yard chip shot, allowing the Seahawks to escape with the victory. However, the Seahawks' luck ran out in the divisional round, against the #1 seed Carolina Panthers. In one of the most disastrous first halves in team history, the Panthers ran the Seahawks off the field to the tune of a 31–0 halftime lead. The Seahawks made it a game in the second half, bringing the score all the way back to 31–24, but failed to recover an onside kick in the final two minutes of play to seal their fate.

Still, the Seahawks enjoyed their fourth consecutive year of ten or more wins, extending their longest streak in franchise history. The Seahawks also sent seven players to the Pro Bowl, including Russell Wilson, Michael Bennett, Earl Thomas, and Tyler Lockett.

=== 2016 ===
The Seahawks began the 2016 season 4–1. In their next game against the Arizona Cardinals, they ended the game 6-6, the first tie in franchise history. The Seahawks had some impressive victories, including the complete dismantling of the Carolina Panthers 40–7. In week 15, they beat the Los Angeles Rams 24–3 to clinch their third NFC West title in the last four years. The Seahawks finished the season as the third seed in the NFC at 10–5–1. They went on to dominate the Detroit Lions in the wild-card round 26–6, but lost in the Divisional Round to the eventual NFC champion Atlanta Falcons 36–20. Overall, it was their fifth consecutive season with at least 10 wins, setting a franchise record; as well as their fifth consecutive year with a playoff appearance, tying a franchise record set during the 2003-2007 seasons.

=== 2017: Missing the playoffs ===
The 2017 season was the final season of the original Legion of Boom playing together, as well as the 21st and last full season under the ownership of Paul Allen, who died during the 2018 season. The Seahawks were hoping to improve their 10–5–1 record from 2016. However, it didn't happen because of a lack of consistency in the running game, special teams, and the offensive line combined with numerous injuries. The Seahawks started the season well at 8–4. They had an impressive win when they held the eventual Super Bowl LII champions, the Philadelphia Eagles, to just 10 points in their 24–10 victory. However, they lost 3 of their next 4 games, including a 42–7 home loss at the hands of the Los Angeles Rams. They finished the season 9–7, marking the first time since 2011 that the Seahawks failed to achieve double-digit wins. It was also the first time since that same year that they did not qualify for the playoffs. Russell Wilson finished as the league's leader in touchdown passes with 34, and finished as the team's leading rusher with 586 yards.

=== 2018: Return to the playoffs ===
There were low expectations for the Seahawks in the 2018 season. Many key players left the team. Cornerback Richard Sherman, defensive lineman Cliff Avril, and punter Jon Ryan were all released. Tight ends Jimmy Graham and Luke Willson, wide receiver Paul Richardson, and running back Thomas Rawls all departed in free agency. Kam Chancellor announced his retirement on July 1, 2018, due to the neck injury he sustained in week 10 of the previous season. In week 4 against the Arizona Cardinals, free safety Earl Thomas broke a bone in his left leg and missed the remainder of the season. Some of the players that were picked in the 2018 NFL draft include first rounder running back Rashaad Penny, standout tight end Will Dissly, eventual Pro Bowler punter Michael Dickson, and the first one-handed player in NFL history, Shaquem Griffin.

Paul Allen, owner of the Seahawks since 1997, died of cancer on October 15, 2018, at the age of 65.

The Seahawks started the season on the wrong foot, starting 0–2 and having given up 12 sacks and averaging 68 yards rushing a game. They won their next two games narrowly, but the Seahawks completely turned around the season in week 5. Although they lost to the Los Angeles Rams 33–31, they put up an impressive 190 rushing yards and won the turnover battle 2–0. The Seahawks then won their next two, including against the Oakland Raiders in their first NFL International Series game in London, England. They then fell to both of the Los Angeles teams, the Chargers and the Rams, but then went on a rampage, winning 6 of their next 7. Some notable wins, were against the 6–2 Carolina Panthers and against the eventual MVP Patrick Mahomes and the 11–3 Kansas City Chiefs. With that win, they clinched the a playoff berth and eventually finished the season as the 5th seed in the NFC at 10–6.

In the Wild Card game, they dueled with the 4th seed Dallas Cowboys. The Seahawks, however, could never get their run game going and, combined with kicker Sebastian Janikowski's injury at the end of the first half, led to them being down 10 with 2:08 remaining, the score being 24–14. The Seahawks rallied for a touchdown and subsequent two point conversion to cut the deficit to 2, but failed to recover Michael Dickson's drop kick onside kick, ending the game with a final score of 24–22.

=== 2019 ===
The Seahawks again started the season down many key players. They officially terminated the contract of strong safety Kam Chancellor and also wide receiver Doug Baldwin after failed physicals. They also traded defensive end Frank Clark to the Kansas City Chiefs. However, they did pick up many notable players. One was top wide receiver prospect DK Metcalf with the 64th pick of the draft. They beefed up their defensive line by signing defensive end Ezekiel Ansah to a one-year contract, and traded Jacob Martin, Barkevious Mingo, and a third-round pick for defensive end Jadeveon Clowney.

The Seahawks started the 2019 season 2–0 with wins over the Cincinnati Bengals and the Pittsburgh Steelers, marking their first 2–0 start since the 2013 season, in which they won the Super Bowl. They proceeded to fall to the New Orleans Saints, falling 6 points short of a 20-point comeback. This was their first home loss in September in the Pete Carroll era. The Seahawks rebounded, winning two straight divisional matchups, beating the Arizona Cardinals 27–10 on the road and the Los Angeles Rams on Thursday Night 30–29 at home. During their week 6 matchup against the Cleveland Browns, tight end Will Dissly tore his Achilles tendon and was placed on injured reserve for a consecutive season. The Seahawks ended up winning the game 32–28. The following week, the Seahawks played the Baltimore Ravens, who had signed Earl Thomas in the offseason. The Ravens prevailed, winning 30–16, marking Russell Wilson's only game with a passer rating of under 100 the whole season as well as his first interception. The Seahawks edged out the Atlanta Falcons 27–20 in their next game, which marked the first time the Seahawks were 4–0 on the road since 1980. The Seahawks managed to rally past the Tampa Bay Buccaneers 40–34 in overtime, with Russell Wilson throwing a season high 5 touchdowns, with Jacob Hollister, picked up off waivers from the New England Patriots and Tyler Lockett catching two apiece. The Seahawks played a thriller on the road against the 8-0 San Francisco 49ers, prevailing in a consecutive overtime game, 27–24, with Jason Myers making the game-winning field goal as time expired. The Seahawks continued the forward momentum and won their next two games, but lost to the Rams 28–12 for their first and only road loss of the season. The Seahawks' 7–1 road record was the best in franchise history. The Seahawks rebounded against the Carolina Panthers 30–24, clinching a playoff spot, but lost their final two consecutive home divisional games, including a nail-biting week 17 rematch with the 49ers in which Jacob Hollister fell just inches from the goalline on 4th and goal. The two losses were influenced by the loss of three running backs in the last few games of the season, Chris Carson, Rashaad Penny, and C. J. Prosise. This lead them to sign ex-Seahawks running-back Marshawn Lynch, who was in his second retirement.

The Seahawks finished as the 5th seed in the NFC, and played a Week 12 rematch against the Philadelphia Eagles for the wild-card round. While the Seahawks' pass rush was nearly non-existent during the season (registering just 28 sacks the entire season) they went on a rampage, recording 7 sacks during the game. DK Metcalf also broke the NFL record for most receiving yards by a rookie in their postseason debut with 160 yards. The Seahawks won, ironically, with the same score as the matchup earlier in the season, 17–9. In the Divisional round, the Seahawks matched up against the 13–3 Green Bay Packers. The Seahawks fell behind early, trailing 21–3 at halftime. However, the Seahawks came roaring back, thanks to two Marshawn Lynch touchdowns as well as one from Tyler Lockett, and trailed 28–23 late in the fourth quarter. The Seahawks managed to get the ball back with 4:54 remaining, but could not get a touchdown and were forced to punt. Their season ended on a controversial first-down pass from Aaron Rodgers to Jimmy Graham, resulting in the Packers winning 28–23.

=== 2020: Division champions ===
The Seahawks made some big moves during the offseason, adding All-Pro star safety Jamal Adams from the New York Jets in a blockbuster trade in exchange for safety Bradley McDougald, a first-round and third-round pick in 2021, and a 2022 first-round pick, and lockdown corner Quinton Dunbar from the Washington Football Team to bolster their secondary. They also added wide receiver Phillip Dorsett from the Patriots veteran tight-end Greg Olsen from the Panthers. and running back Carlos Hyde from the Houston Texans, who racked up 1070 yards in the 2019 season, to fill in for a still injured Rashaad Penny. A notable loss was Jadeveon Clowney signing with the Tennessee Titans after a long free agency stalemate.

Due to the COVID-19 pandemic, the NFL preseason was canceled for the 2020 season in its entirety.

In the first game of the season, the Seahawks started on the road against the Atlanta Falcons. In this game, the Seahawks abandoned their "run first" philosophy and answered fans calls to "let Russ cook." Russell Wilson had a career day, completing 31/35 passes (88.6%) for 322 yards, 4 touchdowns and no interceptions. The Seahawks breezed past the Falcons 38–25, but the defense surrendered 450 passing yards to Falcons quarterback Matt Ryan. In the next two home games, each with no fans present (due to COVID-19 concerns), the Seahawks edged out the New England Patriots and the Dallas Cowboys, with Wilson throwing 5 touchdown passes in each, setting the NFL record for most touchdown passes through the first three games of the season. The Seahawks defense continued to give up a lot of passing yards, allowing 397 and 472 in those two games, respectively. A win over the Miami Dolphins followed by a comeback victory over the Minnesota Vikings marked the first 5–0 start in franchise history. The Seahawks suffered their first loss of the season at the hands of the Arizona Cardinals, which ended with a Zane Gonzalez field goal in the waning seconds of overtime. The Seahawks bounced back with a 37–27 victory over their division rivals, the San Francisco 49ers, with their defense allowing just 117 yards and one touchdown through the first three quarters of play. However, any progress made by the Seahawks defense was erased the following week against the Buffalo Bills, as they allowed 415 yards, an 81.6% completion percentage, and 4 total touchdowns to quarterback Josh Allen as the Seahawks suffered their second loss in three weeks, having given up 44 points, the most since Pete Carroll took over as head coach. They suffered their third loss in four outings against the Los Angeles Rams.

On November 19, 2020, the Seahawks announced that CenturyLink Field was renamed to Lumen Field due to CenturyLink rebranding as Lumen Technologies starting on their Thursday night rematch with the Cardinals. They won the game 28–21, with their defense turning a corner, holding the Cardinals' top-ranked offense to 314 yards, compared to 519 in their last meeting. Dunlap had 2 sacks and three quarterback hits, including the game winning sack on fourth down with under a minute to play. The defensive momentum continued into the next matchup with the Philadelphia Eagles, where the defense had 6 sacks, an interception, and didn't allow a first down until the Eagles' 6th drive. They also allowed 250 total yards and 17 points, both season bests. Their offense was shut down by the New York Giants as they were upset 17–12, but they bounced back against the then-winless New York Jets 40–3. After a narrow 20–15 win over the Washington Football Team, the Seahawks' defense dominated the Rams, beating them 20–9 and clinching the NFC West for the first time since 2016. They rounded out the season with a 26–23 win over the 49ers.

The Seahawks achieved a record of 12–4 for just the third time in team history, as well as tying for the second best record in franchise history. Finishing 12–4 landed them in the 3rd seed of the NFC and set up a third meeting with the Rams. Quarterback Russell Wilson finished the regular season with 40 passing touchdowns, besting his own record of 35. He came up just 8 yards short of breaking the franchise record of 4,219 passing yards, also set by himself back in 2016. Wide receiver DK Metcalf broke Steve Largent's record for receiving yards in a season with 1,303. Wide receiver Tyler Lockett broke Bobby Engram and Doug Baldwin's record of receptions in a season with 100. Kicker Jason Myers did not miss a field goal the entire season, with a streak of 35 makes extending into last season. The Seahawks fell to the rival-Rams for the first home playoff loss in the Pete Carroll era by a score of 30–20. The game marked their third playoff loss in the last four years, compared to just one win. Their offense only mustered 2 touchdowns, one of which came when down by 17 late in the fourth quarter. Wilson played badly throughout thanks to poor offensive line play. In addition to being sacked five times, he completed just 11 of 27 passes for 174 yards, 2 touchdowns, and 1 interception, with the interception being a 42-yard pick six.

=== 2021 ===
The Seahawks started off the season 2–2, including a week two matchup with the Titans in which they surrendered 183 yards and three rushing touchdowns to Derrick Henry and lost in overtime despite a 14-point fourth quarter lead. During the third quarter of the team's week five matchup against the Rams, quarterback Russell Wilson dislocated his right middle finger when hit defender Aaron Donald while attempting a pass. Backup Geno Smith took over at quarterback for the remainder of the game. In Smith's first drive under center, he led the sluggish Seahawks offense on a 98-yard touchdown drive. The comeback attempt fell short when Smith later through an interception during the Seahawks' final drive of the game. Smith would start the next three games for the Seahawks, losing two more before winning against the Jaguars. In that game, he completed 20/24 pass attempts, including his first 14 consecutively, threw two touchdown passes, ran for one, and had zero interceptions. Following the bye week, Wilson returned from his injury and started against the Packers. With Wilson back at quarterback, the Seahawks lost their next three games. After that, they finished out the season with four wins and two more losses, ending with a 7–10 record. This was the most losses the Seahawks had finished with since 2009 and the first time they finished fourth in their division since 2000.

=== 2022: Post-Wilson era ===
The Seattle Seahawks had low expectations following their poor performance in 2021 and the release of star linebacker Bobby Wagner. On March 8, 2022, the Seahawks agreed to trade quarterback Russell Wilson and a 2022 second-round draft pick to the Denver Broncos for quarterback Drew Lock, tight end Noah Fant, defensive lineman Shelby Harris, two first-round picks (2022 (9th overall) and 2023, respectively), two second-round picks (2022 (40th overall) and 2023, respectively) and a 2022 fifth-round pick. The Seahawks were widely criticized for the trade while the Broncos were generally praised and expected to now be able to compete with the Chiefs for the AFC West. However, the Wilson-led Broncos failed to qualify for the playoffs, winning just five games, with Wilson passing for just 16 touchdowns (his career low) compared to 11 interceptions.

The Seahawks, on the other hand, exceeded expectations. With Smith starting at quarterback they begin their season with a primetime matchup against Wilson and the Broncos, in which the Seahawks outlasted the Broncos 17–16. They lost their next two games before rebounding to beat the Lions in a 48–45 shootout, in which running back Rashaad Penny exploded for 151 rushing yards, to even their record at 2–2. During a loss to the Saints, Penny suffered a broken fibula and a severe ankle sprain, causing him to miss the remainder of the season. Kenneth Walker III filled in as the lead rusher. The Seahawks went on to win their next four games, resulting in a 6–3 record. However, they lost their momentum, losing five out of their next six games to fall out of the playoff picture. They managed to win their final two games, finishing with a 9–8 record and securing the seventh seed in the NFC thanks to the Lions topping the Packers on Sunday Night Football. In the Wild Card round, the Seahawks kept it close in the first half against the division rival and Super Bowl favorite 49ers, leading by one going into the third quarter. However, they collapsed in the second half, losing 41–23.

Walker III finished the season with 1,050 rushing yards and nine touchdowns, becoming just the second player in franchise history with 1,000 rushing yards as a rookie. Smith finished with the best stats of his career: a league-leading 69.8% completion percentage, for 4,282 yards, 30 touchdowns, 11 interceptions, and a 100.9 passer rating. His performance earned him his first Pro-Bowl appearance and the AP and PFWA Comeback Player of the Year award.

=== 2023: Pete Carroll's final season ===
The 2023 season proved to be a turning point where the Seahawks started with a 6–3 record and they went on to a 4-game losing streak. They would later match their 9-8 record from last season, however it wasn't enough for them to make the playoffs.

On January 10, 2024, the Seahawks fired Pete Carroll from his role as head coach, having been the longest-tenured coach in the franchise's history. Although he was allowed to remain on with the team in an advisory role, Carroll was hired two weeks later to become the head coach of the Las Vegas Raiders.

== 2024–present: Mike MacDonald era ==
=== 2024: Narrowly missing playoffs ===
On January 31, 2024, the Seattle Seahawks hired Baltimore Ravens defensive coordinator Mike Macdonald as the team's new head coach. The 2024 season saw the Seahawks finish with a 10–7 record, narrowly missing the playoffs, losing a strength of victory tie–breaker to their NFC West rival Los Angeles Rams.

=== 2025: 50th anniversary; second Super Bowl title ===
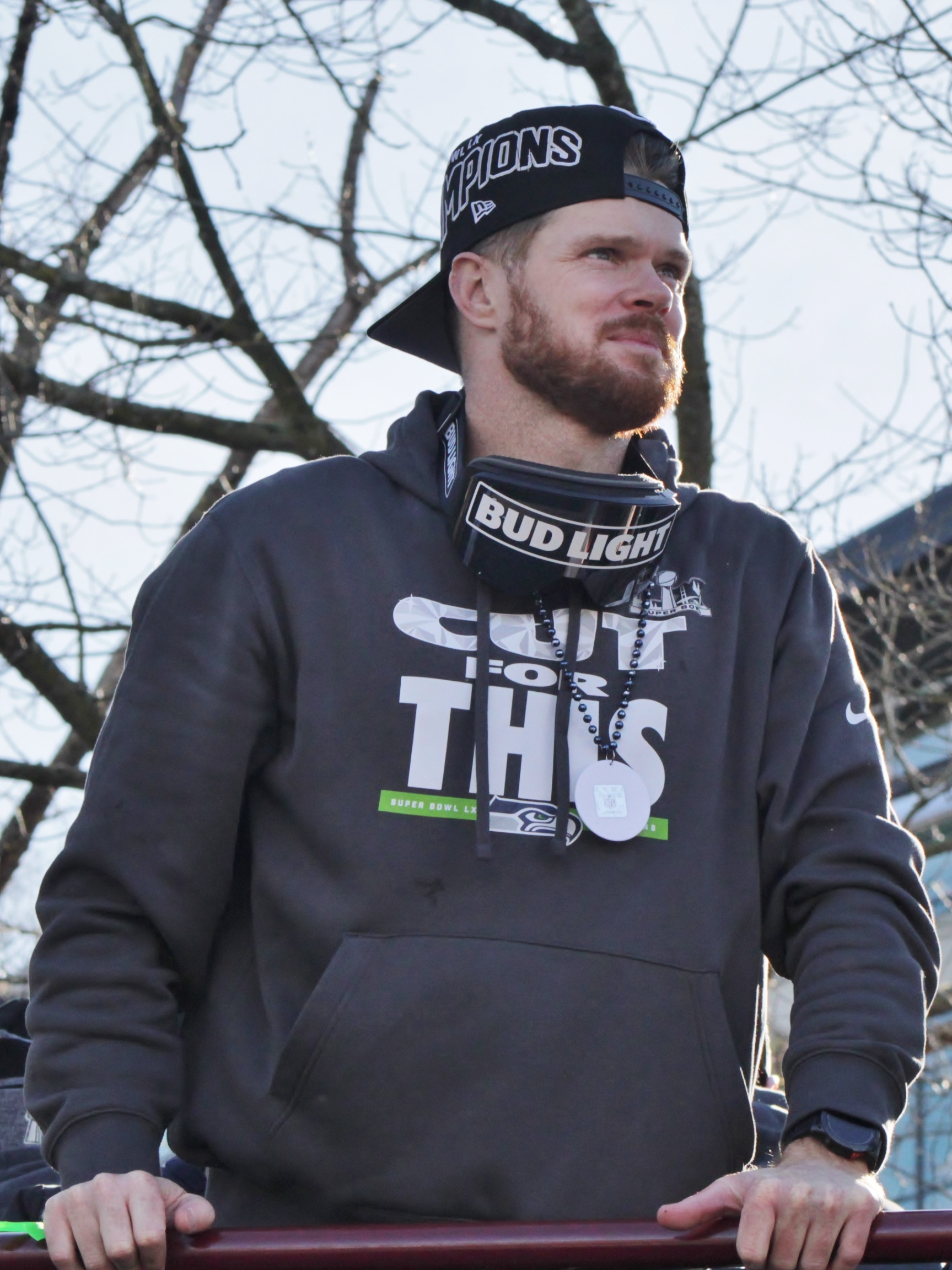
Sam Darnold led the Seahawks to their second Super Bowl title in 2025.

During the offseason, the Seahawks revamped most of their offense, as Geno Smith was traded to the Las Vegas Raiders, DK Metcalf was traded to the Pittsburgh Steelers, and Tyler Lockett was released. Smith was replaced with free agent quarterback Sam Darnold, who had come off a career year with the Minnesota Vikings in 2024. The Seahawks signed free agent receiver Cooper Kupp, who had left the Rams after the 2024 season. They also drafted Grey Zabel and Tory Horton in the 2025 draft and made a trade before the deadline for All-Pro returner and receiver Rashid Shaheed. On the defensive side of the ball, the Seahawks signed linebacker DeMarcus Lawrence, resigned Ernest Jones IV and drafted hybrid safety Nick Emmanwori. Jaxon Smith-Njigba became the team's top receiving target after Metcalf's departure, and quickly became one of the game's elite receivers, as he broke the Seahawks single season record in receiving yards with 1,793, which was good enough to win the league's receiving yards title. Smith-Njigba also won First Team All-Pro and Offensive Player of the Year honors.

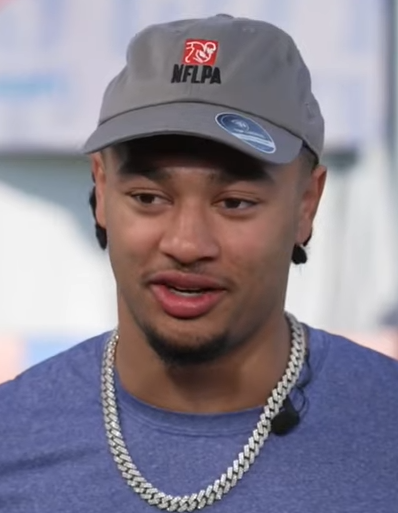
Jaxon Smith-Njigba set the Seahawks single season receiving yards record in 2025 with 1,793.

The Seahawks got off to a 7–3 start before winning their final seven games, including a week 16 comeback win against the Rams and a week 18 game against the 49ers that determined the division title and the NFC's number 1 seed. The Seahawks were statistically one of the best teams in the NFL on both sides of the ball. The Seahawks finished third in scoring offense, averaging 28.4 points per game, and had "The Dark Side", which was the number one scoring defense, allowing just 17.2 points per game. The Seahawks finished the year 14–3, the highest regular season win total in franchise history, as well as the top spot in the NFC playoffs. On top of that, Sam Darnold became just the second quarterback in NFL history to have 14 win seasons in back-to-back years. After missing the first round with a bye, the Seahawks hosted their division rival San Francisco 49ers in the Divisional Round, where they won handily, 41–6. In the NFC Championship Game, they faced another division rival: the Los Angeles Rams, where they won 31–27 to advance to the Super Bowl for the fourth time in franchise history.

==== Super Bowl LX ====
In a rematch of Super Bowl XLIX, the Seahawks faced off against the New England Patriots, seeking their revenge for their loss to them in that game. The game was mostly dominated by defense, as the Seahawks led 9–0 at halftime, and 12–0 coming into the fourth quarter, making it just the second Super Bowl in history to not have a single touchdown throughout the first three quarters. (Note: After Super Bowl LIII) The Seahawks finally scored the game's first touchdown in the fourth quarter to make it 19–0. The Seahawks defense completely shut down the Patriots offense, as despite two late touchdowns, Patriots quarterback Drake Maye turned the ball over three times, losing a fumble and throwing two interceptions, one of which being a pick-six that sealed the game. The Seahawks won 29–13 to get their revenge against the Patriots and clinch their second Super Bowl title in team history, with Kenneth Walker III winning Super Bowl MVP. The Seahawks also became the first team in NFL history to go an entire postseason run without a single offensive turnover.
