= Ed McGlasson =

American football player (born 1956)

No. 67, 54, 59
- Position: Center

Personal information
- Born: July 11, 1956 (age 70); Annapolis, Maryland, U.S.
- Listed height: 6 ft 4 in (1.93 m)
- Listed weight: 248 lb (112 kg)

Career information
- High school: Bullis School (Potomac, Maryland)
- College: Maryland; Youngstown State
- NFL draft: 1979: 10th round, 263rd overall pick

Career history
- New York Jets (1979); Los Angeles Rams (1980); New York Giants (1981); Philadelphia Eagles (1983)*
- * Offseason or practice squad member only

Career NFL statistics
- Games played: 24
- Stats at Pro Football Reference

Edward Tandy McGlasson (born July 11, 1956) is an American former professional football player who was an offensive lineman in the National Football League (NFL). Born and raised in Potomac, Maryland, he played college football for the Youngstown State Penguins. McGlasson played in the NFL for the Los Angeles Rams, New York Jets and New York Giants before entering full-time ministry. He has spoken at numerous conferences across the country.

After getting healed from a knee injury that led to his conversion, McGlasson eventually entered the ministry after another knee injury ended his NFL career.

McGlasson has written a book entitled The Difference a Father Makes: Calling Out the Magnificent Destiny in Your Children, published in 2004 by Ampelon Publishing. He pastors the Stadium Vineyard Church in Anaheim, California.
