= Kelly Kirchbaum =

American football player (born 1957)

No. 62, 51, 54
- Position: Linebacker

Personal information
- Born: June 14, 1957 (age 69); Fort Knox, Kentucky, U.S.
- Listed height: 6 ft 2 in (1.88 m)
- Listed weight: 240 lb (109 kg)

Career information
- High school: North Hardin (Radcliff, Kentucky)
- College: Kentucky (1975–1978)
- NFL draft: 1979: 5th round, 123rd overall pick

Career history
- New York Jets (1979–1980); Kansas City Chiefs (1980); Houston Oilers (1982)*; Tampa Bay Bandits (1983–1985); Denver Dynamite (1987); Philadelphia Eagles (1987)
- * Offseason or practice squad member only

Awards and highlights
- ArenaBowl champion (1987); Second-team All-Arena (1987)
- Stats at Pro Football Reference
- Stats at ArenaFan.com

Kelly L. Kirchbaum (born June 14, 1957) is an American former professional football player who was a linebacker for two seasons in the National Football League (NFL) with the Kansas City Chiefs and Philadelphia Eagles. He was selected by the New York Jets in the fifth round of the 1979 NFL draft after playing college football for the Kentucky Wildcats. Kirchbaum also played for the Tampa Bay Bandits of the United States Football League (USFL) and the Denver Dynamite of the Arena Football League (AFL).

== Early life and college ==
Kelly L. Kirchbaum was born on June 14, 1957, in Fort Knox, Kentucky. He participated in both football and wrestling at North Hardin High School in Radcliff, Kentucky. He was inducted into the North Hardin High School Athletic Hall of Fame in 2007.

Kirchbaum was a four-year letterman for the Kentucky Wildcats of the University of Kentucky from 1975 to 1978. He recorded one interception in 1977.

== Professional career ==
Kirchbaum was selected by the New York Jets in the fifth round, with the 123rd overall pick, of the 1979 NFL draft. He was placed on injured reserve on August 21, 1979, and spent the entire season there. He was placed on injured reserve again on September 1, 1980, and was later waived on December 16, 1980.

Kirchbaum was claimed off waivers by the Kansas City Chiefs on December 18, 1980. He played in one game for the Chiefs during the 1980 season. He was released on July 25, 1981.

Kirchbaum signed with the Houston Oilers on June 7, 1982, and was released on August 3, 1982.

On September 7, 1982, Kirchbaum signed with the Tampa Bay Bandits of the United States Football League (USFL) for the 1983 USFL season. He played in eight games, all starts, for the Bandits in 1983, recording one sack and one fumble recovery. He started 17 games, recovering one fumble, in 1984 as the team finished with a 14–4 record and lost in the Eastern Conference semifinals to the Birmingham Stallions. Kirchbaum posted one sack and two fumble recoveries for Tampa Bay in 1985. The USFL folded after the 1985 season.

Kirchbaum played in three games for the Denver Dynamite of the Arena Football League (AFL) during the league's inaugural 1987 season, posting nine solo tackles, four assisted tackles, one forced fumble, one fumble recovery, and one pass breakup. He also played offense during his time in the AFL as the league played under ironman rules. The Dynamite finished the season with a 4–2 record and won ArenaBowl I against the Pittsburgh Gladiators. For his performance during the 1987 season, Kirchbaum was named second-team All-Arena as an offensive lineman/defensive lineman.

On September 25, 1987, Kirchbaum signed with the Philadelphia Eagles during the 1987 NFL players strike. He played in three games for the Eagles and recovered one fumble. He was released on October 19, 1987, after the strike ended.
