= Paul Darby =

American football player (born 1956)

No. 84
- Position: Wide receiver

Personal information
- Born: October 22, 1956 (age 70); Austin, Texas, U.S.
- Listed height: 5 ft 10 in (1.78 m)
- Listed weight: 192 lb (87 kg)

Career information
- High school: Lyndon B. Johnson (Austin)
- College: Texas State
- NFL draft: 1979: 12th round, 314th overall pick

Career history
- New York Jets (1979–1980); Miami Dolphins (1982)*; Philadelphia Eagles (1983)*
- * Offseason or practice squad member only

Career NFL statistics
- Receptions: 3
- Receiving yards: 48
- Receiving touchdowns: 1
- Stats at Pro Football Reference

Paul Willie Darby (born October 22, 1956) is an American former professional football player who was a wide receiver in the National Football League (NFL) for the New York Jets from 1979 to 1980. He played college football for the Texas State Bobcats.
