= Jim Kensil =

Personal information
- Born: August 19, 1930; Philadelphia, Pennsylvania, U.S.
- Died: January 16, 1997 (aged 66); Massapequa, New York, U.S.

Career history
- New York Jets (1977–1988) President/general manager
- Executive profile at Pro Football Reference

Jim Kensil (August 19, 1930 – January 16, 1997) was an American football executive who served as the president and general manager of the New York Jets from 1977 to 1988 and as the executive director of the National Football League from 1968 to 1977, where he worked under NFL Commissioner Pete Rozelle.

Kensil was born in Philadelphia, Pennsylvania and attended the University of Pennsylvania. After a short stint as a sportswriter for the Associated Press, he joined the NFL as a public relations director, and spent the rest of his career in professional football.

He died of heart failure on January 16, 1997, in Massapequa, New York at age 66.
