= New York Jets all-time roster (L–Z) =

1,553 players have appeared in at least one regular season or postseason game in the National Football League (NFL) or American Football League (AFL) for the New York Jets franchise since 1960. This list includes those whose last names fall between "L" and "Z". For the rest of the players, see New York Jets all-time roster (A–K). This list is accurate through the end of the 2025 NFL season.

== L ==
- Jeff Lageman
- Pat Lamberti
- Pete Lammons
- Emmanuel Lamur
- Dawan Landry
- LaRon Landry
- Skip Lane
- Harvey Langi
- Ellis Lankster
- Jamari Lattimore
- Lance Laury
- Ty Law
- Al Lawson
- Carl Lawson
- Shaq Lawson
- Luke Lawton
- Allen Lazard
- Pat Leahy
- Courtney Ledyard
- Darron Lee
- Delphfrine Lee
- Jordan Leggett
- Lance LeGree
- Corey Lemonier
- Cecil Leonard
- Jim Leonhard
- Jeremy LeSueur
- Alex Lewis
- Kenny Lewis
- LeQuan Lewis
- Mo Lewis
- Rich Lewis
- Sherman Lewis
- Sid Lewis
- George Lilja
- Alec Lindstrom
- Toni Linhart
- Pete Liske
- John Little
- Kevin Lockett
- Ernie Logan
- Mark Lomas
- Kevin Long
- Spencer Long
- Dean Look
- Ronnie Lott
- David Loverne
- Omare Lowe
- Dwight Lowery
- Nick Lowery
- Ray Lucas
- Jim Luscinski
- Frankie Luvu
- Rick Lyle
- Lester Lyles
- Johnnie Lynn
- Marty Lyons

== M ==
- Ron Mabra
- J. P. Machado
- Dee Mackey
- Kyle Mackey
- Siupeli Malamala
- Josh Malone
- Mark Malone
- Robert Malone
- Nick Mangold
- Braden Mann
- Ed Marinaro
- Bob Marques
- Brandon Marshall
- Jalin Marshall
- Jonathan Marshall
- Leonard Marshall
- Nick Marshall
- Tank Marshall
- Wilber Marshall
- Blanche Martin
- Bob Martin
- Curtis Martin
- Jacob Martin
- Jamar Martin
- Josh Martin
- Ronald Martin
- Saladin Martin
- Steve Martin
- Tracy Martin
- Tommy Marvaso
- Derrick Mason
- Eddie Mason
- Bill Mathis
- Terance Mathis
- Trevor Matich
- John Matlock
- Rishard Matthews
- Josh Mauga
- Francisco Mauigoa
- Lorenzo Mauldin
- Arthur Maulet
- Kevin Mawae
- Sherriden May
- Aaron Maybin
- Marcus Maye
- Michael Mayes
- Don Maynard
- Bob McAdams
- Carl McAdams
- Kevin McArthur
- Justin McCareins
- Pete McCartney
- Matt McChesney
- Cliff McClain
- Albert McClellan
- Darrell McClover
- Josh McCown
- Marcelino McCrary-Ball
- Jim McCusker
- Wahoo McDaniel
- Conor McDermott
- Will McDonald IV
- Bradley McDougald
- Dexter McDougle
- Greg McElroy
- Reggie McElroy
- Ed McGlasson
- Chester McGlockton
- Connor McGovern
- Jon McGraw
- Braiden McGregor
- Elijah McGuire
- Garrett McIntyre
- Everett McIver
- Kareem McKenzie
- Mike McKibben
- Takkarist McKinley
- Joe McKnight
- Chase McLaughlin
- Steve McLendon
- Erik McMillan
- John McMullan
- Austin McNamara
- Emanuel McNeil
- Freeman McNeil
- Dave Meggett
- Lance Mehl
- Armand Membou
- Chuck Mercein
- Giradie Mercer
- Mark Merrill
- Mike Merriweather
- Scott Mersereau
- John Metchie
- Rich Miano
- Walt Michaels
- Ray Mickens
- Dave Middendorf
- Doug Middleton
- Rontez Miles
- Brett Miller
- Justin Miller
- Dee Milliner
- Jalen Mills
- Denzel Mims
- Cedric Minter
- Rick Mirer
- Bob Mischak
- Adonai Mitchell
- Johnny Mitchell
- Max Mitchell
- Mike Mitchell
- Mike Mock
- Matt Monger
- Art Monk
- Jarius Monroe
- D. J. Montgomery
- Ty Montgomery
- Will Montgomery
- Brandon Moore
- Derland Moore
- Elijah Moore
- Malachi Moore
- Rashad Moore
- Rob Moore
- Ronald Moore
- John Mooring
- Joe Moreino
- Earthwind Moreland
- Jake Moreland
- Fran Morelli
- Tim Moresco
- Steve Morley
- Thomas Morstead
- Chad Morton
- Kelvin Moses
- Morgan Moses
- C. J. Mosley (born 1983)
- C. J. Mosley (born 1992)
- Santana Moss
- Joe Mott
- Daniel Muir
- Davlin Mullen
- Matthew Mulligan
- Wayne Mulligan
- Nick Mumley
- Dan Murray
- Adrian Murrell
- Marques Murrell
- Jason Myers
- Josh Myers
- Leonard Myers
- Ryan Myers

== N ==
- Kai Nacua
- Browning Nagle
- Joe Namath
- Jim Nance
- Hamsah Nasirildeen
- JoJo Natson
- Lorenzo Neal
- Richard Neal
- Sharrod Neasman
- Nik Needham
- John Neidert
- Kenny Neil
- David Nelson
- Robert Nelson
- Keith Neubert
- Tim Newman
- Xavier Newman-Johnson
- Billy Newsome
- Tom Newton
- Gerald Nichols
- Parry Nickerson
- Doug Nienhuis
- George Nock
- David Norrie
- Mike Nugent
- Kene Nwangwu

== O ==
- Ben Obomanu
- Ken O'Brien
- Victor Ochi
- Tom O'Connor
- Don Odegard
- Neil O'Donnell
- Matt O'Dwyer
- Eric Ogbogu
- Cedric Ogbuehi
- Alfred Oglesby
- Alec Ogletree
- Chukwuma Okorafor
- Clint Oldenburg
- Isaiah Oliver
- Jeff Oliver
- Jim O'Mahoney
- Steve O'Neal
- Bob O'Neil
- Dennis Onkotz
- Patrick Onwuasor
- Richard Osborne
- Kelechi Osemele
- Dennis O'Sullivan
- Burgess Owens
- Marv Owens
- Chris Owusu

== P ==
- Calvin Pace
- Payton Page
- Derek Pagel
- Joe Pagliei
- Tony Paige
- Lonnie Palelei
- Al Palewicz
- Scott Palmer
- Chris Pantale
- Babe Parilli
- Artimus Parker
- Orlando Parker
- Tommy Parks
- Will Parks
- Bernie Parmalee
- James Parrish
- Bill Pashe
- Riley Patterson
- Dainard Paulson
- Charone Peake
- Joe Pellegrini (born 1956)
- Joe Pellegrini (born 1957)
- Claude Pelon
- Mike Pennel
- Chad Pennington
- La'Mical Perine
- Bill Perkins
- Pete Perreault
- Breshad Perriman
- Bryce Petty
- Roman Phifer
- Gerry Philbin
- Del'Shawn Phillips
- Harrison Phillips
- Kyle Phillips
- Lou Piccone
- Bill Pickel
- Damon Pieri
- Kevin Pierre-Louis
- Lawrence Pillers
- Eddy Piñeiro
- Jason Pinnock
- Ropati Pitoitua
- Anthony Pleasant
- Sherman Plunkett
- Jason Pociask
- Brodney Pool
- Brian Poole
- Steve Poole
- Daniel Pope
- Troymaine Pope
- Kevin Porter
- Hank Poteat
- Sione Po'uha
- Art Powell
- Bilal Powell
- Craig Powell
- Darnell Powell
- Marvin Powell
- Walt Powell
- Dennis Price
- Jim Price
- Anthony Prior
- Joe Prokop
- Bob Prout
- Trevor Pryce
- Calvin Pryor
- Terrelle Pryor
- Garry Puetz
- Tanner Purdum

== Q ==
- Ryan Quigley
- Brent Qvale

== R ==
- Bob Raba
- George Radachowsky
- Bill Rademacher
- Ian Rafferty
- Pat Ragusa
- Chuck Ramsey
- Patrick Ramsey
- Dennis Randall
- Sheldon Rankins
- Hamilcar Rashed Jr.
- Kenyon Rasheed
- Randy Rasmussen
- Darrol Ray
- Kalif Raymond
- Bert Rechichar
- Haason Reddick
- Sheldrick Redwine
- D. J. Reed
- Ed Reed
- James Reed
- Steve Reese
- Frank Reich
- Bob Reifsnyder
- Trevor Reilly
- Mike Remmers
- Bob Renn
- Konrad Reuland
- Darrelle Revis
- Darius Reynaud
- Josh Reynolds
- LaRoy Reynolds
- Kerry Rhodes
- Jim Richards
- Perry Richards
- Huey Richardson
- Jeff Richardson
- Sheldon Richardson
- Tony Richardson
- Ryan Riddle
- Dante Ridgeway
- Stevan Ridley
- John Riggins
- Bobby Riley
- Elijah Riley
- Eric Riley
- Eron Riley
- Larry Riley
- Lee Riley
- Phillip Riley
- Jamie Rivers
- Travis Roach
- Andre Roberts
- Darryl Roberts
- Wes Roberts
- William Roberts
- Dewayne Robertson
- Bill Robinson
- Damien Robinson
- Edmond Robinson
- Gregg Robinson
- James Robinson
- Jerry Robinson
- Khiry Robinson
- Larry Robinson
- Mark Robinson
- Matt Robinson
- Rashard Robinson
- Paul Rochester
- Aaron Rodgers
- Steve Rogers
- John Roman
- Ken Rose
- Jim Rosecrans
- Dave Ross
- Jeremy Ross
- Bob Rowley
- Jeremy Ruckert
- Ben Rudolph
- Coleman Rudolph
- Carl Russ
- Joe Ryan
- Pat Ryan
- Sean Ryan

== S ==
- Troy Sadowski
- Tom Saidock
- Abdul Salaam
- Greg Salas
- Johnny Sample
- Mark Sanchez
- Rick Sapienza
- Ricky Sapp
- Howard Satterwhite
- George Sauer, Jr.
- Jalen Saunders
- Khalen Saunders
- Corey Sawyer
- Wes Saxton
- Chaz Schilens
- Caleb Schlauderaff
- Anthony Schlegel
- Henry Schmidt
- Joe Schmiesing
- John Schmitt
- Adam Schreiber
- Ken Schroy
- Gerhard Schwedes
- Bob Schweickert
- Wes Schweitzer
- Bart Scott
- Jaleel Scott
- Todd Scott
- Tony Scott
- Bob Scrabis
- Austin Seferian-Jenkins
- Austin Seibert
- Paul Seiler
- Kendall Sheffield
- Brady Sheldon
- Brandon Shell
- Jacoby Shepherd
- Nathan Shepherd
- Lito Sheppard
- Jamien Sherwood
- Billy Shields
- Bill Shockley
- Spencer Shrader
- Mickey Shuler
- Mark Shumate
- Trevor Siemian
- Don Silvestri
- Arnie Simkus
- Matt Simms
- Deon Simon
- John Simpson
- Curt Singer
- Jackson Sirmon
- Quentin Skinner
- Buster Skrine
- Webster Slaughter
- Matt Slauson
- Tanzel Smart
- Stone Smartt
- Allen Smith
- Arian Smith
- Brad Smith
- Brandon Smith
- Brent Smith
- Christopher Smith
- Devin Smith
- Don Smith
- Eric Smith
- Geno Smith
- Hayden Smith
- Jason Smith
- Jeff Smith
- Keidron Smith
- Mazi Smith
- Otis Smith
- Reggie Smith
- Tyron Smith
- Vyncint Smith
- Wade Smith
- Mark Smolinski
- Matt Snell
- Kurt Sohn
- Scott Solomon
- Butch Songin
- Treg Songy
- Jerald Sowell
- Rich Sowells
- Ryan Spadola
- Blake Spence
- Cody Spencer
- Rob Spicer
- C. J. Spiller
- Marc Spindler
- Kirk Springs
- Zac Stacy
- Ron Stallworth
- Julian Stanford
- Tony Stargell
- Marshall Starks
- Jason Staurovsky
- Brandon Stephens
- Bruce Stephens
- Harold Stephens
- Mac Stephens
- Steve Stephens
- Neal Sterling
- ArDarius Stewart
- Daleroy Stewart
- Quincy Stewart
- Wayne Stewart
- Qwan'tez Stiggers
- Ed Stinson
- Dwight Stone
- Omar Stoutmire
- Derrick Strait
- Chris Streveler
- Tony Stricker
- Donald Strickland
- Michael Stromberg
- George Strugar
- Dan Stryzinski
- Chansi Stuckey
- Jim Stuckey
- Vern Studdard
- Zach Sudfeld
- Shafer Suggs
- John Sullivan
- Chazz Surratt
- Bob Svihus
- Kevin Swayne
- Jim Sweeney
- Tony Sweet
- Tre Swilling
- Clovis Swinney
- Jeff Sydner
- J.J. Syvrud
- Rich Szaro
- Dave Szott

== T ==
- Bob Talamini
- Mike Taliaferro
- Steve Tannen
- Billy Taylor
- Ed Taylor
- Ja'Sir Taylor
- Jason Taylor
- Leonard Taylor III
- Malik Taylor
- Mason Taylor
- Michael Taylor
- Troy Taylor
- Tyrod Taylor
- Tim Tebow
- Pat Terrell
- Rick Terry
- Vinny Testaverde
- Martin Tevaseu
- Corky Tharp
- Azareye'h Thomas
- Blair Thomas
- Bryan Thomas
- Demaryius Thomas
- Earlie Thomas
- Eric Thomas
- John Thomas
- Josh Thomas
- Lawrence Thomas
- Randy Thomas
- Solomon Thomas
- Kenbrell Thompkins
- Jamie Thompson
- Steve Thompson
- James Thornton
- Jim Tiller
- Joe Tippmann
- Joe Todd
- Richard Todd
- Eric Tomlinson
- LaDainian Tomlinson
- Laken Tomlinson
- Reggie Tongue
- Al Toon
- LaVerne Torczon
- Jo-Jo Townsell
- Ross Travis
- Jack Trudeau
- Isaiah Trufant
- Jason Trusnik
- Jay Tufele
- Tom Tupa
- Godwin Turk
- Matt Turk
- Bake Turner
- Billy Turner
- Jim Turner
- Marcus Turner
- Maurice Turner
- Patrick Turner
- Rob Turner
- Rocky Turner
- Vince Turner
- Stacy Tutt
- Will Tye
- Maurice Tyler

== U ==
- C. J. Uzomah

== V ==
- Xazavian Valladay
- Alex Van Dyke
- Greg Van Roten
- Kaare Vedvik
- Alijah Vera-Tucker
- Michael Vick
- Roger Vick
- Jonathan Vilma
- Kimo von Oelhoffen

== W ==
- Stan Waldemore
- Clive Walford
- Donnie Walker
- Mykal Walker
- Wesley Walker
- Darrin Walls
- Henry Walls
- Ed Wals
- Austin Walter
- Matt Walters
- Sam Walton
- Chris Ward
- Dedric Ward
- Tim Ward
- Carter Warren
- Al Washington
- Brian Washington
- Clyde Washington
- Leon Washington
- Marvin Washington
- Rashad Washington
- Jim Waskiewicz
- Bob Watters
- Craig Watts
- Eric Watts
- Steve Weatherford
- Larry Webster
- Ted Wegert
- Sammy Weir
- Doug Wellsandt
- Bob Werl
- Greg Werner
- Trevon Wesco
- Dave West
- Mel West
- Willie West
- Jamaal Westerman
- Ja'Markis Weston
- Marty Wetzel
- Ken Whisenhunt
- Charlie White
- Dwayne White
- Javin White
- Jordan White
- Lee White
- Mike White
- Steve White
- Jordan Whitehead
- Blake Whitlatch
- Hall Whitley
- Casey Wiegmann
- Jermaine Wiggins
- Daniel Wilcox
- J. J. Wilcox
- Bert Wilder
- Rachad Wildgoose
- Brandon Wilds
- Muhammad Wilkerson
- Avery Williams
- Brent Williams
- David Williams
- Harry Williams
- Isaiah Williams (born 1993)
- Isaiah Williams (born 2001)
- Kevin Williams
- Leonard Williams
- Marcus Williams
- Mike Williams
- Quincy Williams
- Quinnen Williams
- Terry Williams
- Avery Williamson
- Matt Willig
- Jordan Willis
- Ladell Wills
- Charles Wilson
- Garrett Wilson
- Jarrod Wilson
- Karl Wilson
- Kyle Wilson
- Quincy Wilson
- Tracy Wilson
- Zach Wilson
- Jason Wiltz
- Perrion Winfrey
- Chris Wing
- Bob Winkel
- Kellen Winslow II
- Anthony Wint
- Brian Winters
- Terrence Wisdom
- Phil Wise
- Mike Withycombe
- Mike Witteck
- Samuel Womack
- Bill Wood
- Dick Wood
- Richard Wood
- Al Woodall
- Tory Woodbury
- Danny Woodhead
- John Woodring
- Al Woods
- Jelani Woods
- Larry Woods
- Robert Woods
- Damien Woody
- Roscoe Word
- Paul Worrilow
- Junior Wren
- Gordon Wright
- Kenyatta Wright
- Wallace Wright

== Y ==
- Ryan Yarborough
- Bill Yearby
- Craig Yeast
- Kenny Yeboah
- Dave Yohn
- David Young
- Lonnie Young
- Ryan Young
- Sid Youngelman
- Dave Yovanovits

== Z ==
- Willie Zapalac
- Dave Zawatson
- Eric Zomalt
- Mike Zordich
- Greg Zuerlein
- Jabari Zuniga
