= 1978 New York Jets season =

1978 season of NFL team New York Jets

- Owner: Leon Hess
- Head coach: Walt Michaels
- Home stadium: Shea Stadium

Results
- Record: 8–8
- Division place: 3rd AFC East
- Playoffs: Did not qualify
- Pro Bowlers: WR Wesley Walker

The 1978 New York Jets season was the nineteenth season for the franchise and the ninth in the National Football League. It began with the team trying to improve upon its 3–11 record from each of the previous three seasons under head coach Walt Michaels. Following an opening-game upset over the Miami Dolphins at Shea Stadium, the Jets stayed in contention for most of the season before finishing with an 8–8 record, with Matt Robinson starting 11 games and going 6–5 at quarterback.

== Offseason ==
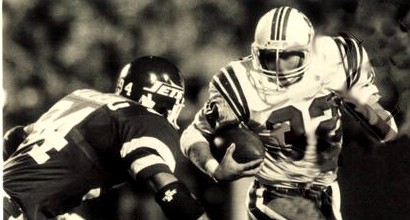
This photo from 1985 shows the Jets’ uniform redesigned and adopted in 1978. Note the green helmet and modified shoulder/sleeve treatment.

The Jets overhauled their uniforms and logos for the 1978 season, abandoning the jerseys they had worn since 1963 and the helmet and logo they’d used since 1965 in favor of a more modern look using the same kelly-green-and-white color scheme. The new helmets were solid green with white facemasks, and a stylized “JETS” wordmark in white on each side. The mark featured angular lettering and a silhouette of a modern jet airplane extending horizontally to the right from the top of the “J” above the “ETS”. The jerseys featured large TV numerals on the shoulders and two thick parallel stripes on the sleeves, while the pants had a single green stripe from hip to knee on each side.

=== NFL draft ===
1978 New York Jets draft
Round	Pick	Player	Position	College	Notes
1	4	Chris Ward	Offensive tackle	Ohio State	
2	31	Mark Merrill	Linebacker	Minnesota	
3	61	Mickey Shuler	Tight end	Penn State	
4	88	Dodie Donnell	Running back	Nebraska	
5	113	Randy Sidler	Linebacker	Penn State	
6	141	Bobby Jackson	Cornerback	Florida State	
6	143	Gregg Robinson	Defensive tackle	Dartmouth	
7	169	Levi Armstrong	Defensive back	UCLA	
7	170	Jim Earley	Running back	Michigan State	
8	197	Derrick Gaffney	Wide Receiver	Florida	
8	203	Mike Mock	Linebacker	Texas Tech	
8	213	Roy Eppes	Safety	Clemson	
9	225	Reggie Grant	Cornerback	Oregon	
9	227	Neil Hutton	Cornerback	Penn State	
10	254	Louis Richardson	Defensive end	Florida State	
11	281	Pat Ryan	Quarterback	Tennessee	
12	311	Alan Williams	Punter	Florida	
Made roster

=== Undrafted free agents ===
1978 undrafted free agents of note
Player	Position	College
Jerry Andrewlavage	Punter	Colgate
Mario Benimeo	Defensive tackle	Montclair State
Don Covin	Cornerback	Trenton State
Matt Cumberworth	Guard	Louisville
Don Fenner	Defensive tackle	C.W. Post
Jim Harrell	Wide receiver	Ohio State
Bobby Jones	Wide receiver	
Nick Lowery	Kicker	Dartmouth
Walt Majewski	Center	Wisconsin–River Falls
Bob Nelson	Quarterback	Shippensburg
Rich Pennella	Punter	Louisville
Terry Ramsey	Linebacker	Connecticut
Bruce Stephens	Wide receiver	Columbia
Chuck White	Wide receiver	Maryland

== Personnel ==
=== Staff ===
1978 New York Jets staff
Front office: Leon Hess – Owner; Jim Kensil – President/CEO; Mike Hickey – Director of player personnel; Jim Royer – Pro personnel coordinator; Ernie Zampese – Scout; Carroll Huntress – Scout; Connie Nicholas – Personnel assistant; Head coaches: Walt Michaels – Head coach; Offensive coaches: John Idzik – Offensive coordinator; Bob Ledbetter – Running backs; Dan Henning – Receivers; Bob Fry – Offensive line	Defensive coaches: Dan Sekanovich – Defensive line; Joe Gardi – Linebackers/special teams; John Mazur – Defensive backs

=== Roster ===
1978 New York Jets roster
Quarterbacks (QB): 17 Matt Robinson; 4 Pat Ryan; Running backs (RB): 25 Scott Dierking; 21 Clark Gaines; 42 Bruce Harper; 33 Kevin Long; 44 Tom Newton; 20 Darnell Powell; Wide receivers (WR): 80 Kevin Bell; 81 Derrick Gaffney; 86 Bobby Jones; 85 Wesley Walker; Tight ends (TE): 83 Jerome Barkum; 88 Mark Iwanowski; 82 Mickey Shuler	Offensive linemen (OL): 60 Dan Alexander G; 67 Darrell Austin G; 65 Joe Fields C; 78 John Gibney C; 79 Marvin Powell T; 66 Randy Rasmussen G; 61 John Roman T; 70 Stan Waldemore G/T; 72 Chris Ward T; Defensive linemen (DL): 73 Joe Klecko DE; 71 Joe Moreino DE; 77 Joe Pellegrini NT; 76 Lawrence Pillers DE; 64 Gregg Robinson DE; 74 Abdul Salaam NT	Linebackers (LB): 63 John Hennessy ILB; 52 Mike Hennigan ILB; 56 Larry Keller OLB; 59 Bob Martin OLB; 58 Mark Merrill ILB; 50 Mike Mock OLB; Defensive backs (DB): 49 Reggie Grant CB; 40 Bobby Jackson CB; 37 Tim Moresco SS; 22 Burgess Owens FS; 48 Ken Schroy FS; 23 Shafer Suggs SS; 38 Ed Taylor CB; Special teams (ST): 5 Pat Leahy K; 15 Chuck Ramsey P	Reserve: 51 Greg Buttle LB (IR); 47 Jim Earley RB (IR); -- Gary Evans G (IR); -- Neil Hutton S (Left squad); 69 Greg Murphy DE (IR); 86 Bob Raba TE (IR); 34 Larry Riley CB (IR); 54 Randy Sidler LB (IR); 87 Bruce Stephens WR (IR); 14 Richard Todd QB (IR); Rookies in italics

== Regular season ==
=== Schedule ===
Week	Date	Opponent	Result	Record	Venue	Attendance
1	September 3	**Miami Dolphins**	**W** 33–20	1–0	Shea Stadium	49,598
2	September 10	at **Buffalo Bills**	**W** 21–20	2–0	Rich Stadium	40,985
3	September 17	Seattle Seahawks	**L** 17–24	2–1	Shea Stadium	46,911
4	September 24	at Washington Redskins	**L** 3–23	2–2	R.F. Kennedy Stadium	54,729
5	October 1	Pittsburgh Steelers	**L** 17–28	2–3	Shea Stadium	52,058
6	October 8	**Buffalo Bills**	**W** 45–14	3–3	Shea Stadium	44,545
7	October 15	at **Baltimore Colts**	**W** 33–10	4–3	Memorial Stadium	45,563
8	October 22	St. Louis Cardinals	**W** 23–10	5–3	Shea Stadium	49,244
9	October 29	at **New England Patriots**	**L** 21–55	5–4	Schaefer Stadium	60,585
10	November 5	at Denver Broncos	**W** 31–28	6–4	Mile High Stadium	74,983
11	November 12	at Philadelphia Eagles	**L** 9–17	6–5	Veterans Stadium	60,249
12	November 19	**New England Patriots**	**L** 17–19	6–6	Shea Stadium	55,568
13	November 26	at **Miami Dolphins**	**W** 24–13	7–6	Orange Bowl	49,255
14	December 3	**Baltimore Colts**	**W** 24–16	8–6	Shea Stadium	50,248
15	December 10	at Cleveland Browns	**L** 34–37 (OT)	8–7	Cleveland Stadium	36,881
16	December 17	Dallas Cowboys	**L** 7–30	8–8	Shea Stadium	52,532
Note: Intra-division opponents are in **bold** text.

=== Game summaries ===
==== Week 1 ====
Team	1	2	3	4	Total
Dolphins	0	6	7	7	20
• Jets	10	10	7	6	33

- Date: September 3
- Location: Shea Stadium, Flushing, New York
- Game start: 1:00 p.m.
- Game attendance: 49,598
- Game weather: 72 °F (22.2 °C); wind 7 miles per hour (11 km/h; 6.1 kn)

Scoring summary
1	NYJ	Wesley Walker 47 yard pass from Richard Todd (Pat Leahy kick)	Jets 7–0
1	NYJ	Pat Leahy 36 yard field goal	Jets 10–0
2	NYJ	Pat Leahy 22 yard field goal	Jets 13–0
2	MIA	Delvin Williams 58 yard run (kick failed)	Jets 13–6
2	NYJ	Mickey Shuler 1 yard pass from Richard Todd (Pat Leahy kick)	Jets 20–6
3	NYJ	Wesley Walker 43 yard pass from Richard Todd (Pat Leahy kick)	Jets 27–6
3	MIA	Nat Moore 1 yard pass from Don Strock (Garo Yepremian kick)	Jets 27–13
4	NYJ	Pat Leahy 46 yard field goal	Jets 30–13
4	NYJ	Pat Leahy 36 yard field goal	Jets 33–13
4	MIA	Loaird McCreay 5 yard pass from Guy Benjamin (Garo Yepremian kick)	Jets 33–20

==== Week 6 ====
Team	1	2	3	4	Total
Bills	7	0	0	7	14
• Jets	14	21	10	0	45

- Date: October 8
- Location: Shea Stadium, Flushing, New York
- Game start: 1:00 p.m. EST
- Game attendance: 44,545
- Game weather: 50 °F (10 °C) • Wind 15 miles per hour (24 km/h; 13 kn)
- Referee: Dick Jorgensen

Scoring summary
1	NYJ	Kevin Long 5 yard run (Pat Leahy kick)	Jets 7–0
1	NYJ	Burgess Owens 40 yard interception return (Pat Leahy kick)	Jets 14–0
1	BUF	Reuben Gant 16 yard pass from Joe Ferguson (Tom Dempsey kick)	Jets 14–7
2	NYJ	Kevin Long 16 yard run (Pat Leahy kick)	Jets 21–7
2	NYJ	Kevin Long 3 yard run (Pat Leahy kick)	Jets 28–7
2	NYJ	Bruce Harper 82 yard punt return (Pat Leahy kick)	Jets 35–7
3	NYJ	Derrick Gaffney 18 yard pass from Matt Robinson (Pat Leahy kick)	Jets 42–7
3	NYJ	Pat Leahy 38 yard field goal	Jets 45–7
4	BUF	Bob Chandler 15 yard pass from Bill Munson (Tom Dempsey kick)	Jets 45–14

==== Week 8 ====
- Television Network: CBS
- Announcers: Don Criqui, Nick Buoniconti and Sonny Jurgensen

Pat Leahy kicked three field goals and Scott Dierking scored a pair of touchdowns as the Jets are still in the hunt for a wild card berth. Leahy who entered the game with an NFL leading 55 points connected on kicks of 20, 38 and 45 yards, the last two in a 13-point third quarter that broke a 10-10 halftime tie. Dierking, who had only one pro touchdowns in his first two seasons, punched over from the 2-yard line and went in from the 11. For the day, Dierking gained 94 yards.

==== Week 10 ====
Team	1	2	3	4	Total
• Jets	0	17	7	7	31
Broncos	14	14	0	0	28

- Date: November 5
- Location: Mile High Stadium
- Game start: 4:00 p.m. EST
- Game attendance: 74,983
- Game weather: 48 °F (8.9 °C); wind 10 miles per hour (16 km/h; 8.7 kn)

Scoring summary
Q1	DEN	Keyworth 5 yard run (Turner kick)	DEN 7–0
Q1	DEN	Thompson 4 yard fumble return (Turner kick)	DEN 14–0
Q2	NYJ	Long 4 yard run (Leahy kick)	DEN 14–7
Q2	DEN	Moses 14 yard pass from Penrose (Turner kick)	DEN 21–7
Q2	DEN	Jackson 28 yard interception return (Turner kick)	DEN 28–7
Q2	NYJ	Gaffney 4 yard pass from Robinson (Leahy kick)	DEN 28–14
Q2	NYJ	Leahy 38 yard field goal	DEN 28–17
Q3	NYJ	Dierking 3 yard run (Leahy kick)	DEN 28–24
Q4	NYJ	Walker 75 yard pass from Robinson (Leahy kick)	NYJ 31–28

==== Week 12 ====
Team	1	2	3	4	Total
• Patriots	0	10	0	9	19
Jets	7	0	3	7	17

- Date: November 19
- Location: Shea Stadium
- Game start: 1:00 p.m. EST
- Game weather: 49 °F (9.4 °C); wind 14 miles per hour (23 km/h; 12 kn)
- Referee: Pat Haggerty
- Television network: NBC

Scoring summary
1	NYJ	Kevin Long 1 yard rush (Pat Leahy kick)	NYJ 7-0
2	NWE	David Posey 47 yard field goal	NYJ 7-3
2	NWE	Horace Ivory 1 yard rush (David Posey kick)	NWE 10-7
3	NYJ	Pat Leahy 45 yard field goal	tie 10-10
4	NWE	Horace Ivory 11 yard rush (kick failed)	NWE 16-10
4	NYJ	Wesley Walker 56 yard pass from Matt Robinson (Pat Leahy kick)	NYJ 17-16
4	NWE	David Posey 24 yard field goal	NWE 19-17

A personal foul call against Burgess Owens led to a Patriots go-ahead field goal in the fourth quarter. The Jets nearly came back to win the game, but Pat Leahy missed a 33 yard field goal to the right with 31 seconds remaining.

=== Standings ===
1978 AFC East standings
	W	L	T	PCT	DIV	CONF	PF	PA	STK
^{(2)} New England Patriots	11	5	0	.688	6–2	9–3	358	286	L1
^{(4)} Miami Dolphins	11	5	0	.688	5–3	8–4	372	254	W3
New York Jets	8	8	0	.500	6–2	7–5	359	364	L2
Buffalo Bills	5	11	0	.313	2–6	4–10	302	354	W1
Baltimore Colts	5	11	0	.313	1–7	3–9	239	421	L5

== Awards and records ==
- Wesley Walker, NFL Leader in Receiving Yards, (1,169)
