= 1977 New York Jets season =

1977 season of NFL team New York Jets

- Owner: Leon Hess
- Head coach: Walt Michaels
- Home stadium: Shea Stadium

Results
- Record: 3–11
- Division place: 4th AFC East
- Playoffs: Did not qualify
- Pro Bowlers: none

The 1977 New York Jets season was the 18th season for the team and the 8th in the National Football League. It began with the team trying to improve upon its 3–11 record from 1976 under new head coach Walt Michaels and beginning the post-Joe Namath era. However, the Jets struggled and finished with a third consecutive 3–11 season.

They won a major off the field court decision. As per the memorandum of understanding signed in late 1961 by team original owner (as the New York Titans) Harry Wismer, Shea Stadium’s co-tenants, the New York Mets, would have exclusive use of the stadium until they had completed their season. The Jets were, in most years, required to open the season with several road games, a problem made worse in 1969 and 1973 when the Mets had long playoff runs. Feeling that this arrangement was a disadvantage, the team announced in 1977 that they would play two home games a year during the month of September at the Giants’ new home in New Jersey, Giants Stadium. Litigation began between New York City and the Jets over the issue, and in the lawsuit’s settlement, the city agreed to allow the Jets to play two September home games a season at Shea beginning in 1978 for the remaining six years in the Jets' lease. In 1977, the Jets were to play one September game at Giants Stadium and an October 2 game at Shea. From 1967 through this season—a span of 11 seasons—the Jets did not play a home game at Shea Stadium in the month of September. As of 2017, the Jets are the first (and so far, only) team in NFL history to finish 3 straight seasons with only 3 wins. During the NFL's 16-game schedule from the 1978 season to the 2020 season, no team finished 3–13 three years in a row, and no team has yet to finish 3–14 three years in a row under the 17-game schedule used since the 2021 season.

== Offseason ==
=== Draft ===
1977 New York Jets draft
Round	Pick	Player	Position	College	Notes
1	4	Marvin Powell	OT	USC	
2	33	Wesley Walker	WR	California	
3	72	Tank Marshall	DT	Texas A&M	
4	90	Scott Dierking	RB	Purdue	
5	116	Perry Griggs	WR	Troy State	
5	129	Gary Gregory	OT	Baylor	
6	144	Joe Klecko * ^{†}	DT	Temple	
7	168	Charlie White	RB	Bethune-Cookman	
7	171	Bob Grupp	P	Duke	
7	195	Kevin Long	RB	South Carolina	
8	200	Dan Alexander	OG	LSU	
8	210	Ed Thompson	LB	Ohio State	
9	227	Matt Robinson	QB	Georgia	
10	256	John Hennessy	LB	Michigan	
11	307	Dave Butterfield	DB	Nebraska	
12	312	Phil Gargis	QB	Auburn	
12	313	Dave Conrad	OT	Maryland	
Made roster † Pro Football Hall of Fame * Made at least one Pro Bowl during career

== Personnel ==
=== Staff ===
1977 New York Jets staff
Front office: Leon Hess – Owner; Jim Kensil – President/CEO; Al Ward – General manager; Mike Holovak – Director of player personnel (until May 20, 1977); Mike Hickey – Director of player personnel (after May 21, 1977); Ernie Zampese – Scout; Carroll Huntress – Scout; Connie Nicholas – Personnel assistant; Head coaches: Walt Michaels – Head coach; Offensive coaches: John Idzik – Offensive coordinator; Bob Ledbetter – Running backs; Dan Henning – Receivers; Bob Fry – Offensive line	Defensive coaches: Dan Sekanovich – Defensive line; Joe Gardi – Linebackers/special teams; John Mazur – Defensive backs

=== Roster ===
1977 New York Jets roster
Quarterbacks (QB): 10 Marty Domres; 17 Matt Robinson; 14 Richard Todd; Running backs (RB): 25 Scott Dierking; 21 Clark Gaines; 42 Bruce Harper; 33 Kevin Long; 44 Tom Newton; 30 Charlie White; Wide receivers (WR): 88 Rich Caster; 85 Wesley Walker; Tight ends (TE): 83 Jerome Barkum; 86 Bob Raba	Offensive linemen (OL): 60 Dan Alexander G; 67 Darrell Austin G; 71 Jeff Bleamer T; 65 Joe Fields C; 72 Ken Helms T; 79 Marvin Powell T; 77 Garry Puetz T; 66 Randy Rasmussen G; 61 John Roman G; Defensive linemen (DL): 64 Al Burton DE; 63 John Hennessy DE; 73 Joe Klecko DT; 68 Tank Marshall DT; 81 Richard Neal DE; 76 Lawrence Pillers DE; 74 Abdul Salaam DT	Linebackers (LB): 51 Greg Buttle OLB; 55 John Ebersole MLB; 52 Mike Hennigan MLB; 57 Jim Jerome OLB; 56 Larry Keller OLB; 53 Al Palewicz OLB; Defensive backs (DB): 37 Billy Hardee CB; 27 Ron Mabra CB; 22 Burgess Owens FS; 24 Artimus Parker SS; 48 Ken Schroy FS; 23 Shafer Suggs SS; 38 Ed Taylor CB; 39 Maurice Tyler CB; Special teams (ST): 5 Pat Leahy K; 15 Chuck Ramsey P	Reserve: 77 Carl Barzilauskas DT (IR); -- Don Coleman LB (IR); 80 Shelton Diggs WR (IR); 45 Louie Giammona RB (IR); 62 Gary Gregory T (IR); 82 David Knight WR (IR); 59 Bob Martin LB (IR); 69 Greg Murphy DE (IR); Rookies in italics

== Schedule ==
Week	Date	Opponent	Result	Record	Venue	Attendance
1	September 18	at Houston Oilers	**L** 0–20	0–1	Astrodome	39,488
2	September 25	**Baltimore Colts**	**L** 12–20	0–2	Giants Stadium	43,439
3	October 2	**New England Patriots**	**W** 30–27	1–2	Shea Stadium	38,227
4	October 9	at **Buffalo Bills**	**W** 24–19	2–2	Rich Stadium	32,046
5	October 16	at **Miami Dolphins**	**L** 17–21	2–3	Miami Orange Bowl	43,446
6	October 23	Oakland Raiders	**L** 27–28	2–4	Shea Stadium	56,734
7	October 30	at **New England Patriots**	**L** 13–24	2–5	Schaefer Stadium	61,042
8	November 6	**Miami Dolphins**	**L** 10–14	2–6	Shea Stadium	51,582
9	November 13	Seattle Seahawks	**L** 0–17	2–7	Shea Stadium	42,923
10	November 20	at **Baltimore Colts**	**L** 12–33	2–8	Memorial Stadium	50,957
11	November 27	Pittsburgh Steelers	**L** 20–23	2–9	Shea Stadium	47,385
12	December 4	at New Orleans Saints	**W** 16–13	3–9	Louisiana Superdome	40,464
13	December 11	**Buffalo Bills**	**L** 10–14	3–10	Shea Stadium	31,929
14	December 18	at Philadelphia Eagles	**L** 0–27	3–11	Veterans Stadium	19,241
Note: Intra-division opponents are in **bold** text.

=== Game summaries ===
==== Week 1: at Houston Oilers ====
Quarter	1	2	3	4	Total
Jets	0	0	0	0	**0**
**Oilers**	0	7	0	13	**20**

at Houston Astrodome, Houston, Texas

- Date: September 18
- Game time: 3:00 p.m.
- Game weather: dome
- Box Score

Game information

**Second quarter**

- HOU – Don Hardeman 1 yard run (Skip Butler kick)

**Fourth quarter**

- HOU – Dan Pastorini 1 yard run (Skip Butler kick)
- HOU – Rob Carpenter 1 yard run (kick failed)

**Passing**

- NYJ – Richard Todd 10/25, 115 yards, INT
- HOU – Dan Pastorini 20/32, 137 yards

**Rushing**

- NYJ – Charlie White 13 att, 43 yards
- HOU – Don Hardeman 12 att, 55 yards, TD

**Receiving**

- NYJ – David Knight 3 rec, 40 yards
- HOU – Ken Burrough 3 rec, 57 yards

==== Week 2 vs. Colts ====
Week Two: Baltimore Colts (1–0) at New York Jets (0–1)

Quarter	1	2	3	4	Total
**Colts**	7	7	6	0	**20**
Jets	0	3	0	9	**12**

at Giants Stadium, East Rutherford, New Jersey

- Date: September 25
- Game time: 1:00 p.m. EST
- Game weather: 55 °F (13 °C)
- Game attendance: 43,439
- Box Score

Game information

**First quarter**

- BAL – Roosevelt Leaks 6-yard run (Toni Linhart kick). Colts 7–0. Drive:

**Second quarter**

- BAL – Don McCauley 2-yard run (Toni Linhart kick). Colts 14–0. Drive:
- NYJ – Pat Leahy 25-yard field goal. Colts 14–3. Drive:

**Third quarter**

- BAL – Don McCauley 1-yard run (Toni Linhart kick). Colts 21–3. Drive:

**Fourth quarter**

- NYJ – Safety, David Lee ran out of end zone. Colts 21–5.
- NYJ – Charlie White 1-yard run (Pat Leahy kick). Colts 21–12. Drive:

Top passers

- BAL – Bert Jones – 9/15, 78 yards, INT
- NYJ – Richard Todd – 13/22, 140 yards, 2 INT

Top rushers

- BAL – Lydell Mitchell – 26 rushes, 68 yards
- NYJ – Charlie White – 12 rushes, 36 yards, TD

Top receivers

- BAL – Don McCauley – 5 receptions, 40 yards
- NYJ – Clark Gaines – 6 receptions, 47 yards

==== Week 11 vs. Steelers ====
Week Eleven: Pittsburgh Steelers (6–4) at New York Jets (2–8)

Quarter	1	2	3	4	Total
**Steelers**	6	14	0	3	**23**
Jets	6	7	0	7	**20**

at Shea Stadium, Flushing, New York

- Date: November 27
- Game time: 1:00 p.m.
- Game weather: 31 °F (−1 °C)
- Game attendance: 47,385
- Referee: Jerry Markbreit
- TV announcers (NBC): Jim Simpson and Merlin Olsen
- Box Score

Game information

**First quarter**

- NYJ – Pat Leahy 33-yard field goal. Jets 3–0. Drive:
- PIT – John Stallworth 37-yard pass from Terry Bradshaw (kick blocked). Steelers 6–3. Drive:
- NYJ – Pat Leahy 47-yard field goal. Tie 6–6. Drive:

**Second quarter**

- PIT – Lynn Swann 5-yard pass from Terry Bradshaw (Roy Gerela kick). Steelers 13–6. Drive:
- NYJ – Scott Dierking 5-yard pass from Matt Robinson (Pat Leahy kick). Tie 13–13. Drive:
- PIT – Franco Harris 1-yard run (Roy Gerela kick). Steelers 20–13. Drive:

**Third quarter**

- No scoring

**Fourth quarter**

- PIT – Roy Gerela 37-yard field goal. Steelers 23–13. Drive:
- NYJ – Bruce Harper 4-yard pass from Richard Todd (Pat Leahy kick). Steelers 23–20. Drive:

Top passers

- PIT – Terry Bradshaw – 10/28, 143 yards, 2 TD, INT
- NYJ – Matt Robinson – 7/19, 80 yards, TD, 3 INT

Top rushers

- PIT – Franco Harris – 21 rushes, 83 yards, TD
- NYJ – Scott Dierking – 23 rushes, 107 yards

Top receivers

- PIT – Lynn Swann – 4 receptions, 54 yards, TD
- NYJ – Scott Dierking – 3 receptions, 26 yards, TD

==== Week 13: vs. Buffalo Bills ====
Joe Ferguson hit Bob Chandler with two touchdown passes as the Bills defeated the Jets 14-10 at Shea Stadium. Pat Leahy opened the scoring, early in the 2nd quarter with a 25-yd Field goal. Richard Todd connected with Wesley Walker to put the Jets ahead with less than two minutes remaining in the final quarter, but Ferguson moved the Bills 92 yards, tossing the winning touchdown with 40 seconds left.

=== Standings ===
AFC East
	W	L	T	PCT	DIV	CONF	PF	PA	STK
^{(2)} Baltimore Colts	10	4	0	.714	6–2	9–3	295	221	W1
Miami Dolphins	10	4	0	.714	6–2	8–4	313	197	W1
New England Patriots	9	5	0	.643	4–4	7–5	278	217	L1
New York Jets	3	11	0	.214	2–6	2–10	191	300	L2
Buffalo Bills	3	11	0	.214	2–6	2–10	160	313	L1
