= 1980 New York Jets season =

1980 season of NFL team New York Jets

- Owner: Leon Hess
- Head coach: Walt Michaels
- Home stadium: Shea Stadium

Results
- Record: 4–12
- Division place: 5th AFC East
- Playoffs: Did not qualify
- Pro Bowlers: T Marvin Powell

The 1980 New York Jets season was the 21st season for the franchise and its eleventh in the National Football League. It began with the team trying to improve upon its 8–8 record from 1979 under head coach Walt Michaels, and being widely predicted to improve further and reach the postseason for the first time since 1969. The Jets finished the season with a record of 4–12.

During the season, the Jets were the only team to lose to the notorious New Orleans Saints team, dubbed the “Aints”. On a day with a wind-chill temperature of 5 °F (−15 °C) and kicking with a gale of 46mph, the Jets failed to hold on to a 13–7 lead after three quarters, losing by a single point, 21–20.

History would repeat itself 11 years later, when the Jets lost 28–27 at home to the Indianapolis Colts, the Colts’ lone victory of that season.

== Offseason ==
=== Draft ===
1980 New York Jets draft
Round	Pick	Player	Position	College	Notes
1	2	Lam Jones	Wide receiver	Texas	from San Francisco
2	40	Darrol Ray	Safety	Oklahoma	
2	47	Ralph Clayton	Wide receiver	Michigan	
3	69	Lance Mehl *	Linebacker	Penn State	
4	95	Jesse Johnson	Defensive back	Colorado	
5	123	Jim Zidd	Linebacker	Kansas	
6	149	George Visger	Defensive tackle	Colorado	
6	152	Tom Schremp	Defensive end	Wisconsin	
7	178	Bob Batton	Running back	UNLV	
7	190	Bennie Leverett	Running back	Bethune–Cookman	
8	205	Jeff Dziama	Linebacker	Boston College	
9	234	Joe Peters	Defensive tackle	Arizona State	
10	260	Guy Bingham	Center	Montana	
11	290	James Zachery	Linebacker	Texas A&M	
12	317	David Dumars	Defensive back	Northeast Louisiana	
Made roster * Made at least one Pro Bowl during career

=== Undrafted free agents ===
1980 undrafted free agents of note
Player	Position	College
Guy Albanese	Cornerback	Middle Tennessee
Ben Bottone	Linebacker	Rhode Island
Lawrence Cole	Safety	Nebraska
Brian Doherty	Running back	Holy Cross
Ed Gallagher	Tackle	Pittsburgh
Mike Gay	Tackle	Kansas
Tony Merendino	Quarterback	Chattanooga

== Personnel ==
=== Staff ===
1980 New York Jets staff
Front office: Leon Hess – Owner; Jim Kensil – President/CEO; Mike Hickey – Director of player personnel; Jim Royer – Director of pro personnel; Carroll Huntress – Scout; Connie Carberg – Personnel assistant; Head coaches: Walt Michaels – Head coach; Offensive coaches: Bob Ledbetter – Running backs; Bob Fry – Offensive line	Defensive coaches: John Mazur – Defensive coordinator; Dan Sekanovich – Defensive line; Joe Gardi – Linebackers/special teams

=== Roster ===
1980 New York Jets roster
Quarterbacks (QB): 11 Craig Penrose; 4 Pat Ryan; 14 Richard Todd; Running backs (RB): 25 Scott Dierking; 42 Bruce Harper; 24 Kenny Lewis; 33 Kevin Long; 44 Tom Newton; Wide receivers (WR): 81 Derrick Gaffney; 86 Bobby Jones; 80 Lam Jones; 85 Wesley Walker; Tight ends (TE): 83 Jerome Barkum; 82 Mickey Shuler	Offensive linemen (OL): 60 Dan Alexander G; 64 Guy Bingham G/C; 68 Eric Cunningham G; 65 Joe Fields C; 79 Marvin Powell T; 61 John Roman T; 70 Stan Waldemore G/C; 72 Chris Ward T; Defensive linemen (DL): 99 Mark Gastineau DE; 90 Chris Godfrey DE; 73 Joe Klecko DE; 93 Marty Lyons DT; 92 Wes Roberts DE; 74 Abdul Salaam DT; 71 Bob Winkel DT	Linebackers (LB): 54 Stan Blinka MLB; 51 Greg Buttle OLB; 55 Ron Crosby OLB; 56 Lance Mehl OLB; 50 John Sullivan MLB; Defensive backs (DB): 49 Steve Carpenter FS; 26 Donald Dykes CB; 45 Jerry Holmes CB; 40 Bobby Jackson CB; 27 Jesse Johnson CB/S; 37 Tim Moresco SS; 28 Darrol Ray FS; 48 Ken Schroy SS; Special teams (ST): 5 Pat Leahy K; 15 Chuck Ramsey P	Reserve: 30 Bobby Batton RB (IR); 22 Ralph Clayton RB (IR); 84 Paul Darby WR (IR); 94 Ralph DeLoach DE (IR); 21 Clark Gaines FB (IR); 29 Johnny Lynn CB (IR); 53 Mike McKibben LB (IR); 66 Randy Rasmussen G (IR); 69 Tom Schremp DE (Left squad); Rookies in italics

== Regular season ==
=== Schedule ===
Week	Date	Opponent	Result	Record	Venue	Attendance
1	September 7	**Baltimore Colts**	**L** 14–17	0–1	Shea Stadium	50,777
2	September 14	at **Buffalo Bills**	**L** 10–20	0–2	Rich Stadium	65,315
3	September 21	San Francisco 49ers	**L** 27–37	0–3	Shea Stadium	50,608
4	September 28	at **Baltimore Colts**	**L** 21–35	0–4	Memorial Stadium	33,373
5	October 5	**New England Patriots**	**L** 11–21	0–5	Shea Stadium	53,604
6	October 12	at Atlanta Falcons	**W** 14–7	1–5	Atlanta–Fulton County Stadium	57,458
7	October 19	Seattle Seahawks	**L** 17–27	1–6	Shea Stadium	52,496
8	October 27	**Miami Dolphins**	**W** 17–14	2–6	Shea Stadium	53,046
9	November 2	at **New England Patriots**	**L** 21–34	2–7	Schaefer Stadium	60,834
10	November 9	**Buffalo Bills**	**L** 24–31	2–8	Shea Stadium	45,677
11	November 16	at Denver Broncos	**L** 24–31	2–9	Mile High Stadium	72,114
12	November 23	Houston Oilers	**W** 31–28 (OT)	3–9	Shea Stadium	52,358
13	November 30	at Los Angeles Rams	**L** 13–38	3–10	Anaheim Stadium	59,743
14	December 7	at Cleveland Browns	**L** 14–17	3–11	Cleveland Municipal Stadium	78,454
15	December 14	New Orleans Saints	**L** 20–21	3–12	Shea Stadium	38,077
16	December 20	at **Miami Dolphins**	**W** 24–17	4–12	Miami Orange Bowl	41,854
Note: Intra-division opponents are in **bold** text.

=== Standings ===
AFC East
	W	L	T	PCT	DIV	CONF	PF	PA	STK
^{(3)} Buffalo Bills	11	5	0	.688	4–4	8–4	320	260	W1
New England Patriots	10	6	0	.625	6–2	9–3	441	325	W2
Miami Dolphins	8	8	0	.500	3–5	4–8	266	305	L1
Baltimore Colts	7	9	0	.438	5–3	6–8	355	387	L3
New York Jets	4	12	0	.250	2–6	3–9	302	395	W1

=== Season summary ===
==== Week 2 at Bills ====
Week Two: New York Jets (0–1) at Buffalo Bills (1–0)

Quarter	1	2	3	4	Total
Jets	3	0	0	7	**10**
**Bills**	0	10	10	0	**20**

at Rich Stadium, Orchard Park, New York

- Date: September 14
- Game time: 1:00 p.m.
- Game weather: 68 °F (20 °C)
- Game attendance: 65,315
- Referee: Pat Haggerty
- TV announcers (NBC): Don Criqui and John Brodie
- Box Score

Game information

First quarter

- NYJ – Pat Leahy 44-yard field goal. Jets 3–0.

Second quarter

- BUF – Joe Cribbs 1-yard run (Nick Mike-Mayer kick). Bills 7–3.
- BUF – Nick Mike-Mayer 47-yard field goal. Bills 10–3.

Third quarter

- BUF – Nick Mike-Mayer 38-yard field goal. Bills 13–3.
- BUF – Jeff Nixon 50-yard interception return (Nick Mike-Mayer kick). Bills 20–3.

Fourth quarter

- NYJ – Clark Gaines 11-yard pass from Richard Todd (Pat Leahy kick). Bills 20–10.

Top passers

- NYJ – Richard Todd – 19/34, 168 yards, TD, INT
- BUF – Joe Ferguson – 18/29, 207 yards

Top rushers

- NYJ – Clark Gaines – 14 rushes, 94 yards
- BUF – Roosevelt Leaks – 12 rushes, 58 yards

Top receivers

- NYJ – Clark Gaines – 12 receptions, 91 yards
- BUF – Reuben Gant – 4 receptions, 84 yards
