= List of Northern Iowa Panthers in the NFL draft =

This is a list of Northern Iowa Panthers football players in the NFL draft.

== Key ==
B	Back	K	Kicker	NT	Nose tackle
C	Center	LB	Linebacker	FB	Fullback
DB	Defensive back	P	Punter	HB	Halfback
DE	Defensive end	QB	Quarterback	WR	Wide receiver
DT	Defensive tackle	RB	Running back	G	Guard
E	End	T	Offensive tackle	TE	Tight end

== Selections ==
Year	Round	Pick	Overall	Player	Team	Position
1966	5	10	74	Randy Schultz	Cleveland Browns	RB
1966	18	1	261	Doug Korver	Atlanta Falcons	C
1968	17	23	458	Roy Pederson	Baltimore Colts	LB
1976	10	24	289	Bill Salmon	Minnesota Vikings	QB
1976	16	9	440	Mike Timmermans	Green Bay Packers	G
1982	11	17	296	Steve Sandon	New England Patriots	QB
1990	6	22	159	Bryce Paup	Green Bay Packers	LB
1991	3	2	57	James Jones	Cleveland Browns	DT
1993	5	17	129	Kenny Shedd	New York Jets	WR
1997	3	28	88	Dedric Ward	New York Jets	WR
1999	5	4	137	Tyree Talton	Detroit Lions	DB
2000	2	29	60	Brad Meester	Jacksonville Jaguars	C
2001	5	28	159	Eddie Berlin	Tennessee Titans	WR
2002	5	34	169	Ryan Hannam	Seattle Seahawks	TE
2008	3	33	96	Chad Rinehart	Washington Redskins	G
2008	7	18	225	Brandon Keith	Arizona Cardinals	T
2015	3	22	86	David Johnson	Arizona Cardinals	RB
2016	4	29	127	Deiondre' Hall	Chicago Bears	DB
2018	5	23	159	Daurice Fountain	Indianapolis Colts	WR
2021	3	29	93	Spencer Brown	Buffalo Bills	T
2021	4	11	115	Elerson Smith	New York Giants	LB
2022	1	19	19	Trevor Penning	New Orleans Saints	T
2024	6	23	199	Khristian Boyd	New Orleans Saints	DT

== Notable undrafted players ==
Note: No drafts held before 1936

Debut year	Player name	Position	Debut NFL/AFL team	Notes
1960	Dennis Remmert	LB	Buffalo Bills	—
1981	Steve Wright	T	Dallas Cowboys	—
1986	Bill Bealles	T	New Orleans Saints	—
1986	Ken Knapczyk	WR	Chicago Bears	—
1986	Troy Thomas	T	Washington Redskins	—
1987	Steve Harris	RB	Minnesota Vikings	—
1987	Larry Miller	QB	Minnesota Vikings	—
1987	Frank Ori	G	Minnesota Vikings	—
1987	Kevin Webster	G	Minnesota Vikings	—
1990	Joe Fuller	DB	San Diego Chargers	—
1993	Willie Beamon	DB	New York Giants	—
1994	Kurt Warner	QB	Green Bay Packers	Pro Football Hall of Fame, Super Bowl champion (XXXIV)
2000	Mike Furrey	WR	Indianapolis Colts	—
2001	Ryan Helming	QB	Kansas City Chiefs	—
2002	Daryon Brutley	CB	Buffalo Bills	—
2002	Kenny Harris	CB	San Francisco 49ers	—
2002	Jake Soliday	WR	Arizona Cardinals	—
2003	Derrick Frost	P	Philadelphia Eagles	—
2004	Benny Sapp	S	Kansas City Chiefs	—
2005	Andy Thorn	TE	Philadelphia Eagles	—
2010	Austin Howard	T	Philadelphia Eagles	—
2011	Ryan Mahaffey	FB	Indianapolis Colts	—
2012	L. J. Fort	LB	Cleveland Browns	—
2015	Xavier Williams	DT	Arizona Cardinals	—
2016	Makinton Dorleant	CB	Green Bay Packers	—
2017	Karter Schult	DE	Cleveland Browns	—
2018	Elijah Campbell	S	Cleveland Browns	—
2022	Isaiah Weston	WR	Cleveland Browns	—
2023	Benny Sapp III	SS	Green Bay Packers	—
2024	Demarcus Governor	CB	Las Vegas Raiders	—
2024	Sam Schnee	WR	Tennessee Titans	—
2025	Jared Penning	G	Baltimore Ravens	—
