= List of Lafayette Leopards in the NFL draft =

This is a list of Lafayette Leopards football players in the NFL draft.

== Key ==
| B | Back | K | Kicker | NT | Nose tackle |
| C | Center | LB | Linebacker | FB | Fullback |
| DB | Defensive back | P | Punter | HB | Halfback |
| DE | Defensive end | QB | Quarterback | WR | Wide receiver |
| DT | Defensive tackle | RB | Running back | G | Guard |
| E | End | T | Offensive tackle | TE | Tight end |

== Selections ==
| Year | Round | Pick | Overall | Player | Team | Position |
|---|---|---|---|---|---|---|
| 1942 | 12 | 2 | 102 | Walt Zirinsky | Cleveland Rams | B |
| 1945 | 12 | 11 | 120 | Ed Podgorski | Green Bay Packers | T |
| 1946 | 21 | 3 | 193 | Charley Loiacano | Pittsburgh Steelers | C |
| 1956 | 19 | 6 | 223 | Bob Fyvie | Baltimore Colts | T |
| 1978 | 10 | 8 | 258 | Rob Stewart | Seattle Seahawks | WR |
| 1987 | 7 | 20 | 188 | Chris Thatcher | Cincinnati Bengals | G |

== Notable undrafted players ==
| Debut Year | Player | Position | Debut Team | Notes Source: |
|---|---|---|---|---|
| 1970 | Ed Baker | QB | New York Giants | — |
| 1982 | Stephen Biale | G | Dallas Cowboys | — |
| 1985 | Nick Kowgios | RB | New York Giants | — |
| 1989 | Tony Miller | RB | New York Jets | — |
| 1990 | Frank Baur | QB | New York Giants | |
| 1990 | Philip Ng | WR | New York Giants | — |
| 2000 | Jim Goff | G | New York Giants | |
| 2006 | Blake Costanzo | LB | New York Jets | — |
| 2015 | Ross Scheuerman | RB | Pittsburgh Steelers | — |
| 2023 | Malik Hamm | LB | Baltimore Ravens | — |
