= Randall Evans =

American gridiron football player (born 1991)

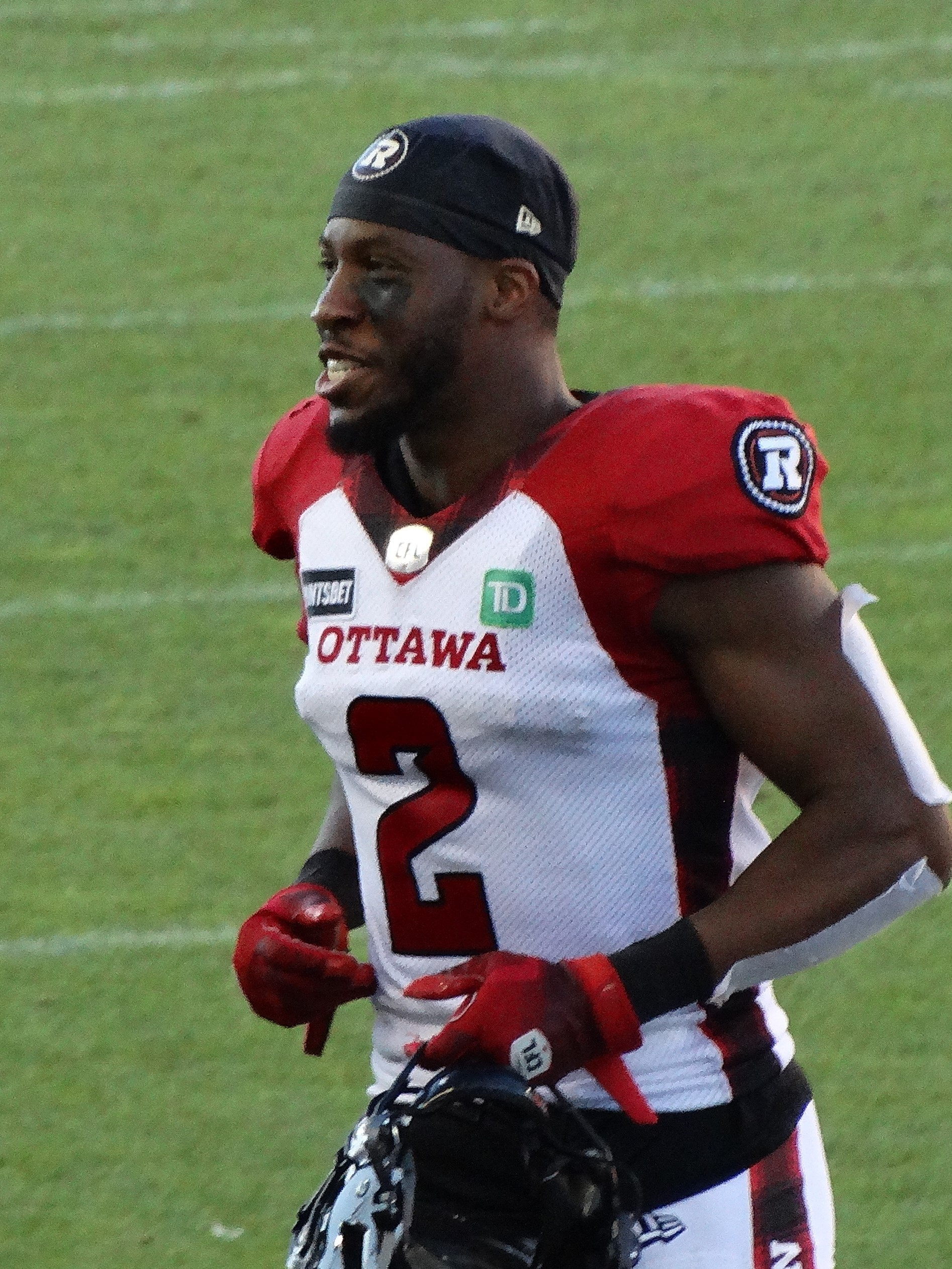
- Evans with the Ottawa Redblacks in 2022

Profile
- Position: Defensive back

Personal information
- Born: December 26, 1991 (age 34); Miami, Florida, U.S.
- Listed height: 6 ft 0 in (1.83 m)
- Listed weight: 195 lb (88 kg)

Career information
- High school: Miami Palmetto (Pinecrest, Florida}
- College: Kansas State
- NFL draft: 2015: 6th round, 196th overall pick

Career history
- Philadelphia Eagles (2015); San Diego / Los Angeles Chargers (2016–2017)*; Hamilton Tiger-Cats (2018); Ottawa Redblacks (2018–2022); Montreal Alouettes (2023)*
- * Offseason or practice squad member only

Awards and highlights
- First-team All-Big 12 (2014)
- Stats at Pro Football Reference
- Stats at CFL.ca

Randall Lemont Evans (born December 26, 1991) is an American professional football defensive back who is a free agent. He was selected by the Philadelphia Eagles in the sixth round of the 2015 NFL draft. He played college football at Kansas State. He has also been a member of the San Diego / Los Angeles Chargers, Hamilton Tiger-Cats, Ottawa Redblacks and Montreal Alouettes.

== Early life ==
Evans lettered all four years at Miami Palmetto High School and helped the Panthers earn a 9–3 record and reach the 2nd round of the state playoffs as junior. He intercepted seven passes and recorded 65 tackles as a junior and came back with five interceptions and 50 tackles as a senior. He participated in the inaugural Miami-Dade/Broward Public vs. Private All-Star Game in January 2010.

He played collegiately at Kansas State.

== Professional career ==
=== Philadelphia Eagles ===
Evans was selected in the sixth round of the 2015 NFL draft as the 196th overall pick by the Philadelphia Eagles. On September 4, 2015 Evans was cut in the final preseason cuts. On September 6, 2015, Evans was signed to the Eagles practice squad. On January 2, 2016, Evans was promoted to the active roster after the Eagles placed nose tackle Bennie Logan on injured reserve with a calf injury. On August 28, 2016, Evans was waived by the Eagles.

=== San Diego Chargers ===
On December 7, 2016, Evans was signed to the San Diego Chargers' practice squad. He signed a reserve/future contract with the Chargers on January 3, 2017. He was waived on September 2, 2017.

=== Hamilton Tiger-Cats ===
Evans joined the Hamilton Tiger-Cats of the Canadian Football League (CFL) in time for the 2018 season, playing one game with the team before being released.

=== Ottawa Redblacks ===
Evans was signed onto the practice roster of the Ottawa Redblacks of the CFL on August 8, 2018. In his first season in Ottawa Evans played in five games and contributed with 15 defensive tackles. Evans, had a breakout year in 2019, Evans suited up for 17 games in 2019, recording 56 defensive tackles and 12 more tackles on special teams. After the 2020 season was cancelled Evans re-signed with the Redblacks on January 26, 2021. Evans continued his strong play during the 2021 season, playing in all 14 regular season games and accumulating a career-high 70 defensive tackles to go along with 12 special teams tackles, four quarterback sacks, two interceptions and two forced fumbles. Evans and the Redblacks agreed to another contract extension on February 1, 2022. In 2022, he played in nine games and recorded 36 tackles before being released on August 22, 2022.

=== Montreal Alouettes ===
Evans was signed to the practice squad of the Montreal Alouettes of the CFL on August 8, 2023 but was released on August 21.

== Personal ==
Evans is the son of Sheldon Evans and Melissa Doctor. He graduated from Kansas State University with two bachelor's degrees; one in sociology with an emphasis in criminology and the other in American ethnic studies.
