= Scott Dierking =

American football player (born 1955)

No. 25
- Position: Running back

Personal information
- Born: May 24, 1955 (age 71); Naval Station Great Lakes, Illinois, U.S.
- Listed height: 5 ft 10 in (1.78 m)
- Listed weight: 218 lb (99 kg)

Career information
- High school: Community (West Chicago, Illinois)
- College: Purdue
- NFL draft: 1977: 4th round, 90th overall pick

Career history
- New York Jets (1977–1983); Tampa Bay Buccaneers (1984)

Awards and highlights
- Second-team All-American (1976); First-team All-Big Ten (1976)

Career NFL statistics
- Rushing attempts: 734
- Rushing yards: 2,915
- Receptions: 124
- Receiving yards: 1,028
- Total TDs: 23
- Stats at Pro Football Reference

Scott Edward Dierking (born May 24, 1955) is an American former professional football player who was a running back in the National Football League (NFL). He played for the New York Jets from 1977 to 1983 after being selected in the fourth round of the 1977 NFL draft. He played college football for the Purdue Boilermakers.

== College career ==
Before his NFL career, he played for Purdue University. In 1976, Dierking was named First-team All-Big Ten Conference.

=== Statistics ===
| Year | Team | Rushing | | | | | Receiving | | |
| Year | Team | Att | Yards | Avg | Yds/G | TD | Rec | Yards | TD |
|---|---|---|---|---|---|---|---|---|---|
| 1973 | Purdue | 33 | 170 | 5.2 | 15.5 | 2 | 2 | 33 | 0 |
| 1974 | Purdue | 164 | 779 | 4.8 | 70.8 | 5 | 10 | 186 | 0 |
| 1975 | Purdue | 180 | 914 | 5.1 | 83.1 | 7 | 9 | 125 | 0 |
| 1976 | Purdue | 201 | 1,000 | 5.0 | 90.9 | 11 | 8 | 92 | 0 |
| Totals | | 578 | 2,863 | 5.0 | 65.1 | 25 | 29 | 436 | 0 |

During his playing career, he was sometimes referred to as the human "coke machine" because of his build and toughness.

== NFL career statistics ==
Legend
| **Bold** | Career high |

=== Regular season ===
| Year | Team | Games | | Rushing | | | | | Receiving | | | | |
| Year | Team | GP | GS | Att | Yds | Avg | Lng | TD | Rec | Yds | Avg | Lng | TD |
|---|---|---|---|---|---|---|---|---|---|---|---|---|---|
| 1977 | NYJ | 14 | 5 | 79 | 315 | 4.0 | 21 | 0 | 4 | 29 | 7.3 | 15 | **1** |
| 1978 | NYJ | 15 | 13 | 170 | 681 | 4.0 | 26 | 4 | 19 | 152 | 8.0 | 17 | 0 |
| 1979 | NYJ | 16 | 14 | **186** | **767** | 4.1 | **40** | 3 | 10 | 121 | **12.1** | **27** | 0 |
| 1980 | NYJ | 16 | 13 | 156 | 567 | 3.6 | 15 | **6** | 19 | 138 | 7.3 | 22 | **1** |
| 1981 | NYJ | 16 | 4 | 74 | 328 | 4.4 | 15 | 1 | 26 | 228 | 8.8 | 23 | **1** |
| 1982 | NYJ | 9 | 0 | 38 | 130 | 3.4 | 11 | 1 | 12 | 80 | 6.7 | 13 | **1** |
| 1983 | NYJ | 16 | 1 | 28 | 113 | 4.0 | 31 | 3 | **33** | **275** | 8.3 | 19 | 0 |
| 1984 | TAM | 8 | 2 | 3 | 14 | **4.7** | 9 | 0 | 1 | 5 | 5.0 | 5 | **1** |
| | | 110 | 52 | 734 | 2,915 | 4.0 | 40 | 18 | 124 | 1,028 | 8.3 | 27 | 5 |

=== Playoffs ===
| Year | Team | Games | | Rushing | | | | | Receiving | | | | |
| Year | Team | GP | GS | Att | Yds | Avg | Lng | TD | Rec | Yds | Avg | Lng | TD |
|---|---|---|---|---|---|---|---|---|---|---|---|---|---|
| 1981 | NYJ | 1 | 0 | 0 | 0 | 0.0 | 0 | 0 | **7** | **52** | **7.4** | **16** | 0 |
| 1982 | NYJ | 3 | 0 | **6** | **16** | **2.7** | **9** | **1** | 4 | 22 | 5.5 | 7 | 0 |
| | | 4 | 0 | 6 | 16 | 2.7 | 9 | 1 | 11 | 74 | 6.7 | 16 | 0 |

== Personal life ==
His son, Dan Dierking, attended Wheaton Warrenville South High School in Wheaton, Illinois where he broke several of Harold "Red" Grange's records and carried his 2006 football team to a state championship; he subsequently won the 2006 Illinois Player of the Year Award. He attended Purdue University as a scholarship running back/full back. He was the team's starting FB for the 2009 season, was Purdue's finest cover man on special teams and was voted team captain for the 2010 season.
