= Vincent Gamache =

American football player (born 1961)

No. 2, 3
- Position: Punter

Personal information
- Born: November 18, 1961 (age 64); Los Angeles, California, U.S.
- Listed height: 5 ft 11 in (1.80 m)
- Listed weight: 174 lb (79 kg)

Career information
- High school: Venice (Los Angeles)
- College: Cal State Fullerton
- NFL draft: 1985: undrafted

Career history
- Los Angeles Raiders (1985)*; Seattle Seahawks (1986); Los Angeles Raiders (1987); San Francisco 49ers (1988)*
- * Offseason or practice squad member only

Career NFL statistics
- Punts: 92
- Punt yards: 3,567
- Longest punt: 55
- Stats at Pro Football Reference

Vincent Gamache (born November 18, 1961) is an American former professional football player who was a punter in the National Football League (NFL). He played college football for the Cal State Fullerton Titans. He played in the NFL for the Seattle Seahawks in 1986 and Los Angeles Raiders in 1987.
