= Darrel Hopper =

American football player (born 1963)

No. 47, 91, 28
- Position: Cornerback

Personal information
- Born: March 14, 1963 (age 63); Los Angeles, California, U.S.
- Listed height: 6 ft 1 in (1.85 m)
- Listed weight: 196 lb (89 kg)

Career information
- High school: Carson (Carson, California)
- College: USC
- NFL draft: 1985: undrafted

Career history
- Seattle Seahawks (1985)*; San Diego Chargers (1987); Ottawa Rough Riders (1989–1990)
- * Offseason or practice squad member only
- Stats at Pro Football Reference

Darrel G. Hopper (born March 14, 1963) is an American former professional football cornerback who played for the San Diego Chargers of the National Football League (NFL). He played college football at University of Southern California.
