= Roger Caron (American football) =

American football player and coach (born 1962)

No. 67, 74
- Position: Offensive tackle

Personal information
- Born: June 3, 1962 (age 64); Boston, Massachusetts, U.S.
- Listed height: 6 ft 5 in (1.96 m)
- Listed weight: 282 lb (128 kg)

Career information
- High school: Norwell (Norwell, Massachusetts)
- College: Harvard
- NFL draft: 1985: 5th round, 117th overall pick

Career history

Playing
- Indianapolis Colts (1985–1986); Buffalo Bills (1987)*; New Orleans Saints (1988)*
- * Offseason or practice squad member only

Coaching
- Williams (1987–1993) (offensive line); Pomona-Pitzer (1994–2004) (head coach); Cheshire Academy (CT) (2005–2006) (head coach); Pomona-Pitzer (2007–2016) (head coach); Ransom Everglades School (FL) (2018–present) (head coach)

Career NFL statistics
- Games played: 10
- Games started: 1
- Stats at Pro Football Reference

Roger Caron (born June 3, 1962) is an American football coach and former player. He played professionally as an offensive tackle for two seasons in the National Football League (NFL) with the Indianapolis Colts. He played college football at Harvard University and was selected by the Colts in the fifth round of the 1985 NFL draft. Caron served two stints as the head coach for the Pomona-Pitzer Sagehens, the joint team of Pomona College and Pitzer College, from 1994 to 2004 and 2007 to 2016, compiling a record of 72–110.

Caron graduated Harvard with a degree in European history in 1985. While at Harvard he was named NCAA Division I-AA first-team Kodak and AP All-American and twice named first-team All-Ivy League. After his stint with the Colts he secured his first coaching job as an assistant with Williams College, where he helped the school's football program to a 45–9–2 record over seven years, which included a 23-game winning streak and 14 straight wins within its "Little Three" division. Caron was also the head wrestling coach at Williams from 1987 to 1994.

Caron now works as a high school history and social sciences teacher, the coordinator of student athlete recruitment, and the head football coach at Ransom Everglades School in Miami, Florida.

== Head coaching record ==
=== College football ===
Year	Team	Overall	Conference	Standing	Bowl/playoffs
Pomona-Pitzer Sagehens (Southern California Intercollegiate Athletic Conference) (1994–1995)
1994	Pomona-Pitzer	1–8	0–6	7th	
1995	Pomona-Pitzer	6–3	4–2	T–2nd	
Pomona-Pitzer Sagehens (NCAA Division III independent) (1996–2002)
1996	Pomona-Pitzer	6–2			
1997	Pomona-Pitzer	6–2			
1998	Pomona-Pitzer	6–2			
1999	Pomona-Pitzer	7–1			
2000	Pomona-Pitzer	4–4			
2001	Pomona-Pitzer	2–6			
2002	Pomona-Pitzer	4–4			
Pomona-Pitzer Sagehens (Southern California Intercollegiate Athletic Conference) (2003–2004)
2003	Pomona-Pitzer	5–4	3–3	5th	
2004	Pomona-Pitzer	4–5			
Pomona-Pitzer Sagehens (Southern California Intercollegiate Athletic Conference) (2007–2016)
2007	Pomona-Pitzer	2–7	1–5	T–6th	
2008	Pomona-Pitzer	2–7	1–5	6th	
2009	Pomona-Pitzer	4–5	2–4	5th	
2010	Pomona-Pitzer	1–8	1–5	T–5th	
2011	Pomona-Pitzer	0–9	0–6	7th	
2012	Pomona-Pitzer	1–8	1–6	7th	
2013	Pomona-Pitzer	2–7	2–5	T–5th	
2014	Pomona-Pitzer	1–8	1–6	T–6th	
2015	Pomona-Pitzer	2–7	1–6	7th	
2016	Pomona-Pitzer	6–3	5–2	T–2nd	
Pomona-Pitzer:		72–110			
Total:		72–110			
