= Clark Gaines =

American football player and coach (born 1954)

No. 21
- Position: Running back

Personal information
- Born: February 1, 1954 (age 72); Elberton, Georgia, U.S.
- Listed height: 6 ft 1 in (1.85 m)
- Listed weight: 206 lb (93 kg)

Career information
- High school: Elberton (GA) Elbert Co.
- College: Wake Forest
- NFL draft: 1976: undrafted

Career history
- New York Jets (1976–1980); Kansas City Chiefs (1981–1982)

Awards and highlights
- PFWA All-Rookie Team (1976); First-team All-ACC (1975)

Career NFL statistics
- Rushing attempts: 582
- Rushing yards: 2,552
- Total TDs: 14
- Stats at Pro Football Reference

Clark Daniel Gaines (born February 1, 1954) is an American former professional football player who was a running back in the National Football League (NFL). He was also a coach in the United States Football League (USFL). He played for the New York Jets and the Kansas City Chiefs over the course of his seven-year NFL career. Gaines was the running backs and special teams coach for the New Jersey Generals of the USFL.

== Early life ==
Gaines was one of only 13 African American students to volunteer to integrate Elbert County High School in Elberton, Georgia. He was coached by Boyd Outz. After graduating from Elbert County Comprehensive High School, Gaines attended Lees-McRae College and graduated from Wake Forest University. In his two seasons as a Demon Deacon, Gaines gained 1,258 yards on 336 carries (3.7 avg.), and was team captain and an All-ACC selection his senior year.

== Professional career ==
Gaines made his professional debut in the NFL in 1976 with the New York Jets. In his rookie season, Gaines ran for 724 yards and hauled in 41 receptions for the Jets. Having been overlooked in the draft due to injuries, Gaines signed with the Jets as a free agent and became the first rookie ever selected as Jets' MVP. In the 1976 season, he led all NFL rookies with 724 yards rushing despite not starting until the seventh game, set a franchise record with four 100-yard rushing games in a single season, and was selected AFC Offensive Rookie of the Year by NFL Players Association.

After being sidelined due to injuries in 1978, Gaines returned in 1979 as a dominant force for the Jets once again. In the 1979 season, he became the first Jet ever to lead the team in rushing and receiving twice, finishing the season fourth among AFC rushing leaders, tied for first in the AFC in yards per carry, and fumbled only once in 186 carries. The Sporting News named him the best running back in the AFC East and the most individual offensive improvement in the division in 1979.

On September 21, 1980, Gaines broke a Jets franchise record with 17 catches in a single game against the San Francisco 49ers, a franchise record that still stands. Gaines is currently third, and first among running backs, in the NFL record books for receptions per game. He was the first undrafted running back to reach 500 yards rushing as a rookie, and one of six in NFL history to do so.

He "wore many hats" for the Jets: although technically a running back, he was also a prolific receiver, was an intimidating blocker in short yardage situations, and played special teams.

Gaines broke his leg in a game against the New England Patriots, in Week 5 of the 1980 NFL season. The following year, the Jets attempted to activate him off injured reserve, by clearing waivers. Instead, the Kansas City Chiefs claimed him. He finished his playing career in Kansas City.

== NFL career statistics ==
Legend
| **Bold** | Career high |

| Year | Team | Games | | Rushing | | | | | Receiving | | | | |
| Year | Team | GP | GS | Att | Yds | Avg | Lng | TD | Rec | Yds | Avg | Lng | TD |
|---|---|---|---|---|---|---|---|---|---|---|---|---|---|
| 1976 | NYJ | 14 | 8 | 157 | 724 | 4.6 | 33 | **3** | 41 | 400 | **9.8** | 27 | 2 |
| 1977 | NYJ | 14 | **13** | 158 | 595 | 3.8 | 19 | **3** | **55** | **469** | 8.5 | **31** | 1 |
| 1978 | NYJ | **16** | 1 | 44 | 154 | 3.5 | 33 | 2 | 3 | 23 | 7.7 | 13 | 0 |
| 1979 | NYJ | **16** | 9 | **186** | **905** | **4.9** | **52** | 0 | 29 | 219 | 7.6 | 15 | 0 |
| 1980 | NYJ | 5 | 5 | 36 | 174 | 4.8 | 15 | 0 | 36 | 310 | 8.6 | 16 | **3** |
| 1981 | KAN | 1 | 0 | 0 | 0 | 0.0 | 0 | 0 | 0 | 0 | 0.0 | 0 | 0 |
| 1982 | KAN | 9 | 0 | 1 | 0 | 0.0 | 0 | 0 | 2 | 17 | 8.5 | 10 | 0 |
| | | 75 | 36 | 582 | 2,552 | 4.4 | 52 | 8 | 166 | 1,438 | 8.7 | 31 | 6 |

== NFLPA ==
Gaines has been employed with the NFL Players Association for 22 years, and in April 2008 was promoted to Assistant Executive Director.

== Personal life ==
Gaines's jersey is retired at Elbert County Comprehensive High School. In 2009, he received the Elbert County Native Citizen Award by the Elbert County Chamber of Commerce.
