= Miami Palmetto Senior High School =

Public secondary school in Pinecrest, Florida, United States

Location
- 7431 SW 120th Street; Pinecrest, Florida, (Miami-Dade County, Florida) 33156; United States; 25°39′45″N 80°18′57″W

Information
- Type: Public secondary
- Motto: Latin: Vis Per Scientiam (Strength through knowledge)
- Established: September 1958; 68 years ago
- School district: Miami-Dade County Public Schools
- Principal: Victoria Dobbs
- Teaching staff: 104.00 (FTE) (2023–2024)
- Grades: 9–12
- Gender: Co-educational
- Enrollment: 2,672 (2023–2024)
- Student to teacher ratio: 25.69 (2023-2024)
- Campus: Suburban
- Colors: Columbia Blue; White
- Song: Neath Palmetto High!
- Mascot: Panther
- Newspaper: The Panther
- Yearbook: Palm Echo
- School hours: 7:20–2:20
- Website: Official website
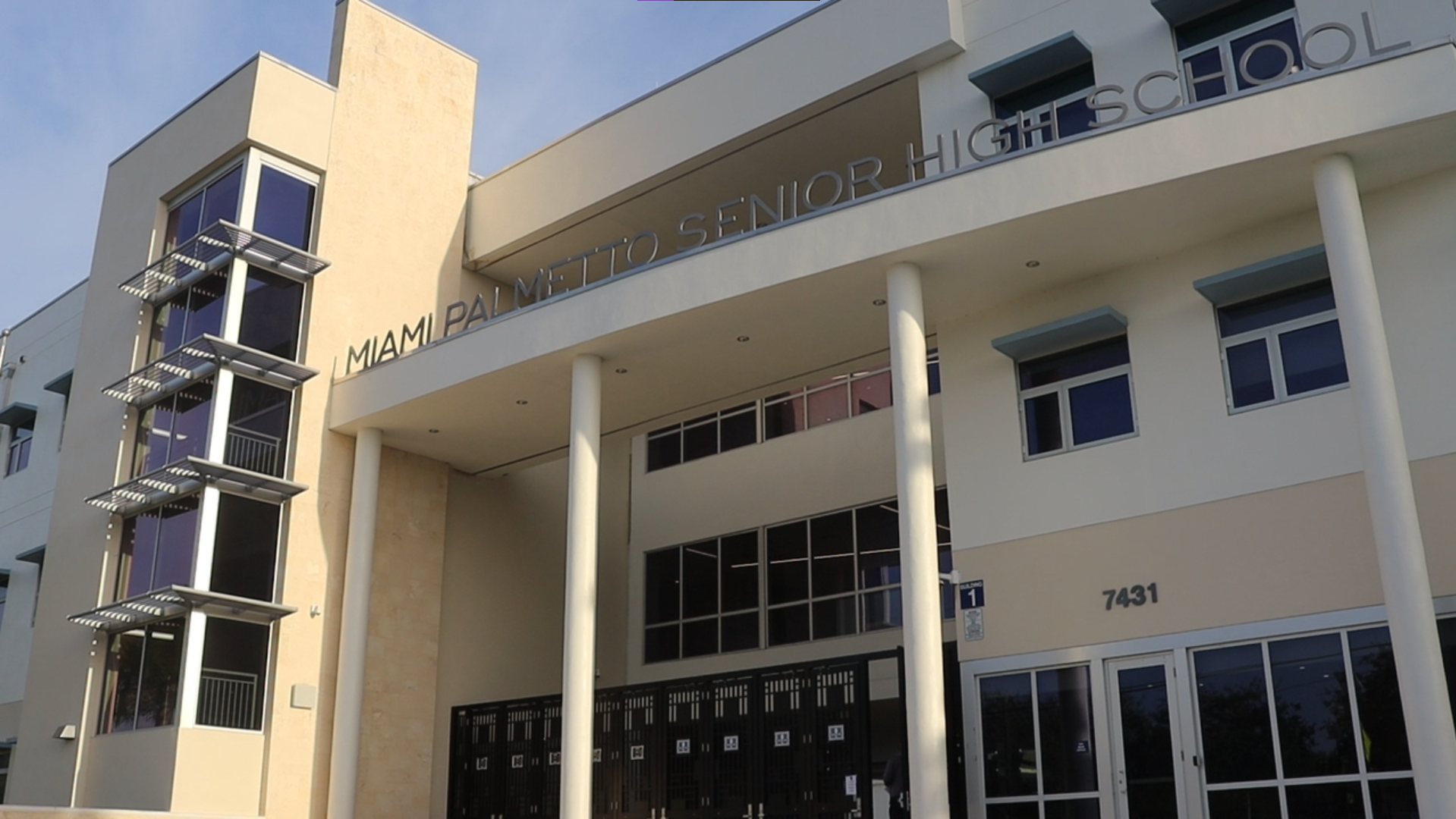
- The front gate of the school as of April 13, 2022

Miami Palmetto Senior High School is a public high school located at 7431 S.W. 120th Street in Pinecrest, Florida. The school is on 23 acres (9.3 ha) in southwest Miami-Dade County, and is part of the Miami-Dade County Public Schools district. Miami Norland Senior High is Miami Palmetto's sister school by original blueprints. The school has been named a Blue Ribbon School of Excellence. Its principal is Victoria Dobbs.

The school serves Pinecrest, Palmetto Bay, and sections of Kendall, West Perrine and Palmetto Estates.

== History ==
Miami Palmetto was built in 1958. Miami Palmetto had a cost of $1,654,400 (equivalent to $14.1 million in 2025). The expected enrollment was 1,500.

It serves a culturally and socioeconomically diverse population. Miami Palmetto is the home school for the residents of Pinecrest, Palmetto Bay, West Perrine, and Palmetto Estates. The school enjoys strong support from the municipal governments of the two primary areas zoned to Palmetto Senior, the Village of Pinecrest and the Village of Palmetto Bay. Both provide noteworthy cash or in-kind donations and have active Educational Advisory Compact agreements that facilitate working with MDCPS. Pinecrest gives $10,000 to the school every year, and Palmetto Bay in 2015 sponsored a community-wide 5K Color Run fundraiser benefit. An active PTSA also contributes substantial resources (funding, programming, volunteer manpower). Palmetto, for years, was a three-year high school, but after the 1997 addition, it expanded to be a four-year high school. In the school's history, a few scandals have surfaced, one in which lacrosse players shared racist remarks through a group chat to later be counseled, and an incident where a student stabbed a classmate and her teacher with scissors. Miami Palmetto is currently participating in a pilot program of AP Capstone.

In 2017, Miami-Dade Public Schools began an extensive three phase reconstruction of the school which was originally budgeted to cost $44 million. The overall remodel includes 120,900 square feet of new construction including a new three-story building to house administrative offices; student services; vocational labs, such as Web Design, drafting and design, health science, and business technology. The remodel also includes a new art wing, photo studio lab, gymnastics space, dance room, music room, and black box theater; new cafeteria building, technology labs, and an indoor and outdoor dining facility adjacent to a central courtyard. The new building, which was completed as Phase 1 of the project, opened in January 2020.

== School Trends ==
=== Academics ===
The curriculum offers a choice of twenty-eight AP courses, and students have the highest pass rate for AP exams in the county. The school's pass rate for AP Chemistry for the 2015 exam was the highest in the State of Florida. Over 50% of students take at least one AP class, and over 50% have a GPA higher than 4.0. Graduates are admitted to a wide variety of the nation's top colleges and universities. Miami Palmetto students score higher on other state and national assessments than other standard (non-magnet) public schools in Miami-Dade County. In addition, as a neighborhood (non-magnet) school, Miami Palmetto serves all student populations. The school's Special Olympics athletes win at state level competitions every year. According to Newsweek's 2001 List of the 1,000 Top U.S. Schools, Miami Palmetto is ranked at 251 in the nation (23rd in the state of Florida). According to the 2007 list, the school is ranked at 72 in the nation. This ranking is based on self-reported statistics, including:

- On-time graduation (91%)
- Graduates immediately enrolling in college (95%)
- Various standardized test scores (45%)
- AP/IB/AICE courses offered per graduate (5%)

== Miami Palmetto Media ==
Miami Palmetto has four publications: the newspaper, The Panther, the morning announcements and television production, Panther TVP, the yearbook, Palm Echo and sports media, Panther Sports Network, They are all managed by student staffs.

== Athletics ==
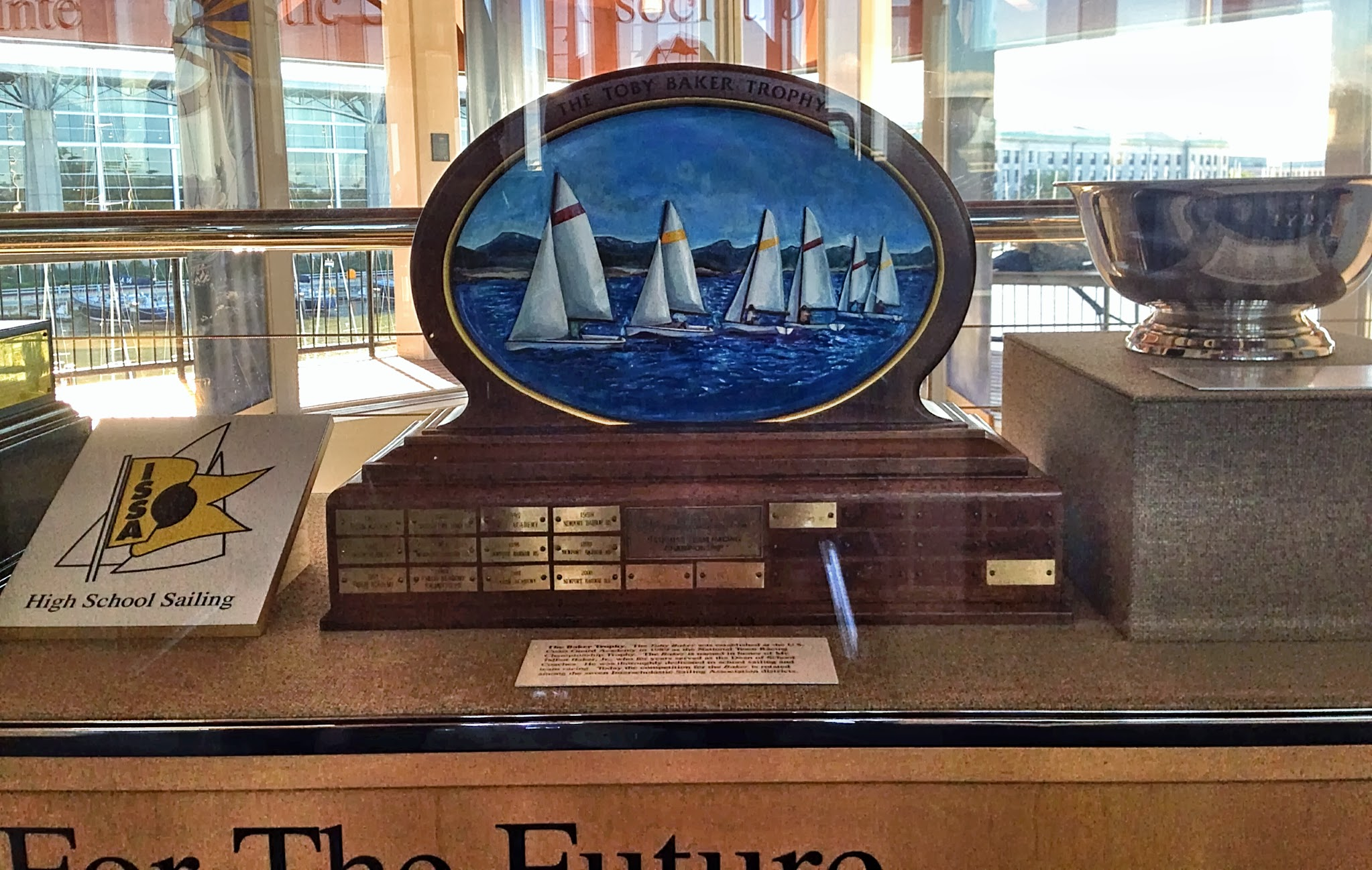
Baker Trophy won by Palmetto in 1994, maintained at the United States Naval Academy

International championships

- Coed sailing – British Schools Dinghy Racing Association Team Racing Champion (by invitation) – 1994

National championships

- Coed sailing – National High School Dinghy Championship (Mallory Trophy) – champion 1994; runner-up 1997
- Coed sailing – national high school team racing champion (Baker Trophy) – 1994
- Single-handed sailing – national interscholastic sailing association champion (Cressy Trophy) – 1989

== Notable alumni ==
- Jeff Bezos – founder of Amazon.com and Blue Origin
- Ketanji Brown Jackson – U.S. Supreme Court associate justice
- Camila Cabello – Grammy-nominated singer, former member of Fifth Harmony; did not graduate.
- Alan Campos – former NFL player for the Dallas Cowboys
- Vinnie Chulk – former professional baseball player, Cleveland Indians, San Francisco Giants, and Toronto Blue Jays
- Erik Compton – professional golfer, runner-up at 2014 U.S. Open
- Barry Collier – basketball coach, Nebraska Cornhuskers men's basketball team
- Derek Connolly – screenwriter of Safety Not Guaranteed and Jurassic World
- Lamart Cooper – former Arena Football League player who held the league record for most kick return TDs and was the main receiver for Kurt Warner during his time with the Iowa Barnstormers
- Larry Crawford – four-time Canadian Football League All-Star and 2023 inductee in the CFL Hall of Fame
- Randall Evans – former NFL player for the Philadelphia Eagles and Canadian Football League
- Katherine Fernandez Rundle — State Attorney for Miami-Dade County, Florida
- Alex Flinn – author of young adult novels
- Tom Foley – third base coach for the Tampa Bay Rays; former Major League Baseball player
- Robin Fraser – former U.S national soccer team member; MLS player with Los Angeles Galaxy; former head coach of Chivas USA
- Nikki Fried – politician, Florida Commissioner of Agriculture, Chair of the Florida Democratic Party
- Terri Garber – actress, played Ashton Main in miniseries North and South
- Glenn Geffner – radio play-by-play announcer for Miami Marlins
- Dominic L. Pudwill Gorie – astronaut
- Ben Greenman – novelist, journalist, and ghostwriter: best-selling author of Mo Meta Blues, The Slippage; writer for The New Yorker; collaborator with Brian Wilson, Sly Stone, and others.
- Matt Gribble – Olympic swimmer, 2-time NCAA champion
- Tim Hardaway Jr. – basketball player, shooting guard for Miami Heat
- Sylvia Hitchcock – Miss USA and Miss Universe 1967
- Bill Hurst – former MLB player with Miami Marlins
- Jonathan James – teen hacker who penetrated NASA and DOD computer systems at age 15
- Candy Jernigan – illustrator, graphic designer, avant-garde multimedia artist
- Fiona Kelleghan – writer and editor, chiefly in fields of science fiction, fantasy and mystery fiction
- Blake Lee - Actor
- Debbie Liebling – entertainment executive and film producer
- Ron Magill – wildlife expert and communications director of Zoo Miami
- Roger Manganelli – bassist for Less Than Jake
- Jo Mersa Marley - musician; grandson of Bob Marley
- Rohan Marley – owner of Marley Coffee & Tuff Gong Clothing; son of Bob Marley
- Jason Marshall Jr. – NFL player for the Miami Dolphins
- Paul McKinley – dean at Saybrook College, Yale University
- Matt Mehana – vocalist for I Set My Friends On Fire
- Bill Miller – former chairman and chief investment officer of Legg Mason Capital Management
- Orson Mobley – former NFL player with the Denver Broncos
- Vivek Murthy – Surgeon General of the United States
- Chris Myers – former NFL player for the Denver Broncos and Houston Texans
- Al Palewicz – former NFL player for the Kansas City Chiefs and New York Jets
- Katie Phang – attorney and television host
- Jennifer Rodriguez – speed skater, world champion and 2-time Olympic bronze medalist
- Wade Rowdon – former MLB player with Cincinnati Reds, Chicago Cubs, and Baltimore Orioles
- Cecil Sapp – former NFL player for the Denver Broncos and Houston Texans
- Kimbo Slice – bareknuckle boxer and mixed martial artist
- Brashard Smith – NFL player for the Kansas City Chiefs
- Leonard Taylor III – NFL player for the New York Jets and New England Patriots
- Dave Williamson – stand-up comedian

== See also ==
- Miami-Dade County Public Schools
