= Alex Carter (defensive end) =

American football player (born 1963)

No. 75, 96
- Position: Defensive end

Personal information
- Born: September 6, 1963 (age 63); Miami, Florida, U.S.
- Listed height: 6 ft 3 in (1.91 m)
- Listed weight: 255 lb (116 kg)

Career information
- High school: South Miami
- College: Tennessee State
- NFL draft: 1985: undrafted

Career history
- Buffalo Bills (1985–1986)*; Miami Dolphins (1987)*; Cleveland Browns (1987); Edmonton Eskimos (1988); Ottawa Rough Riders (1989)*
- * Offseason or practice squad member only

Career NFL statistics
- Sacks: 1
- Stats at Pro Football Reference

Alexander Carter (born September 6, 1963) is an American former professional football player who was a defensive end for the Cleveland Browns of the National Football League (NFL) during the 1987 NFL Players Strike. He played college football for the Tennessee State Tigers.
