= Joe Pellegrini (defensive tackle) =

American football player (born 1956)

No. 77
- Position: Defensive tackle

Personal information
- Born: August 9, 1956 (age 70); Aberdeen, Washington, U.S.
- Listed height: 6 ft 2 in (1.88 m)
- Listed weight: 270 lb (122 kg)

Career information
- High school: Hoquiam (Hoquiam, Washington)
- College: Idaho (1974–1977)
- NFL draft: 1978: undrafted

Career history
- Oakland Raiders (1978)*; New York Jets (1978–1979)
- * Offseason or practice squad member only

Awards and highlights
- Second-team All-Big Sky (1977)
- Stats at Pro Football Reference

Joseph Pellegrini Jr. (born August 9, 1956) is an American former professional football player who was a defensive tackle for the New York Jets of the National Football League (NFL). He played college football for the Idaho Vandals.

== Early life ==
Joseph Pellegrini Jr. was born on August 9, 1956, in Aberdeen, Washington. He attended Hoquiam High School in Hoquiam, Washington.

== College career ==
Pellegrini enrolled at the University of Idaho to play college football for the Vandals. He was an offensive lineman in 1974 and a defensive tackle from 1975 to 1977. He became a starter in college after the player ahead of him on the depth chart suffered an illness and lost 17 pounds during one practice. Pellegrini suffered a season-ending knee injury on October 2, 1976. As a senior in 1977, he posted 74 tackles and 16 sacks, earning second-team All-Big Sky Conference honors. He had three sacks in one game during the 1977 season. At the conclusion of his college career, Pellegrini was invited to play in the East–West Shrine Game.

== Professional career ==
Pellegrini signed with the Oakland Raiders after going undrafted in the 1978 NFL draft. He was waived on August 17, 1978, after the second preseason game.

Pellegrini was claimed off waivers by the New York Jets on August 18, 1978. He made the Jets' regular season roster. He played in nine games, starting one, for the Jets during the 1978 season, recording one sack, one forced fumble, and one fumble recovery. Pellegrini was slated to be a backup in 1979 but started the preseason opener after Gregg Robinson and Marshall Harris left the team and Abdul Salaam suffered an ankle injury. Pellegrini started four games for the Jets during the 1979 regular season before being released on October 2, 1979.

By 1981, Pellegrini was working at First National Bank in Boise, Idaho, reportedly having turned down a contract offer from the Tampa Bay Buccaneers. In August 1981, The Idaho Statesman reported that the Jets had moved Pellegrini from defensive tackle to center and placed him on injured reserve. Pellegrini called the Statesman and told them that a different Joe Pellegrini—who signed with the team as a center and had not played at defensive tackle—was now playing for the Jets.
