= Ken Knapczyk =

American football player and coach (born 1963)

Kenneth Knapczyk
No. 88
- Position: Wide receiver

Personal information
- Born: April 21, 1963 (age 63); Mokena, Illinois, U.S.
- Listed height: 5 ft 11 in (1.80 m)
- Listed weight: 190 lb (86 kg)

Career information
- High school: Lincoln-Way Central (New Lenox, Illinois)
- College: Joliet JC (1982–1983); Northern Iowa (1984)
- NFL draft: 1985: undrafted

Career history

Playing
- Chicago Chargers (1985); Chicago Bears (1986–1987); Cincinnati Bengals (1988)

Coaching
- Fergus Falls CC (1997) Assistant coach; Howard Payne (1998–2000) Assistant coach; Northern State (2001–2003) Offensive coordinator & quarterbacks coach; Saint Anselm (2004) Offensive coordinator & quarterbacks coach; Saint Anselm (2005–2007) Head coach; Dean (2008–2010) Associate head coach; Gateway Charter HS (FL) (2011–2012) Head coach; East Ridge HS (FL) (2013) Head coach; Poinciana HS (FL) (2014–2017) Head coach; Fort Pierce Westwood HS (FL) (2018) Offensive coordinator; Titusville HS (FL) (2019) Head coach

Career NFL statistics
- Receptions: 4
- Receiving yards: 62
- Return yards: 14
- Stats at Pro Football Reference

Kenneth John Knapczyk (born April 21, 1963) is an American football coach and former player. He served as the head football coach at Saint Anselm College in Goffstown, New Hampshire from 2005 to 2007, compiling a record of 1–29.

== Head coaching record ==
=== College ===
Year	Team	Overall	Conference	Standing	Bowl/playoffs
Saint Anselm Hawks (Northeast-10 Conference) (2005–2007)
2005	Saint Anselm	1–9	0–9	10th	
2006	Saint Anselm	0–10	0–9	10th	
2005	Saint Anselm	0–10	0–9	10th	
Saint Anselm:		1–29	0–7		
Total:		1–29			
