= Pete McCartney =

American football player (born 1962)

No. 71
- Position: Offensive tackle

Personal information
- Born: June 15, 1962 (age 64); United States
- Listed height: 6 ft 6 in (1.98 m)
- Listed weight: 260 lb (118 kg)

Career information
- High school: East Rockaway
- College: Louisville
- NFL draft: 1985: undrafted

Career history
- Dallas Cowboys (1985)*; New York Jets (1987)
- * Offseason or practice squad member only

Career NFL statistics
- Games played: 3
- Games started: 1
- Stats at Pro Football Reference

Peter Daniel McCartney (born June 16, 1962) is an American former professional football player who was a tackle for the New York Jets of the National Football League (NFL). He played college football for the Louisville Cardinals.
