= Bobby Batton =

American football player (born 1957)

No. 30
- Position: Running back

Personal information
- Born: March 17, 1957 (age 69); Yazoo City, Mississippi, U.S.
- Listed height: 5 ft 11 in (1.80 m)
- Listed weight: 185 lb (84 kg)

Career information
- High school: Mission (San Francisco, California)
- College: UNLV
- NFL draft: 1980: 7th round, 178th overall pick

Career history
- New York Jets (1980); Washington Redskins (1982)*
- * Offseason or practice squad member only

Career NFL statistics
- Rushing yards: 4
- Rushing average: 1.3
- Stats at Pro Football Reference

Bobby Batton (born March 17, 1957) is an American former professional football player who was a running back for the New York Jets of the National Football League (NFL) in 1980. He played college football for the UNLV Rebels.
