= Kevin Long (running back) =

American football player (1955–2024)

No. 33
- Position: Running back

Personal information
- Born: January 20, 1955; Clinton, South Carolina, U.S.
- Died: September 10, 2024 (aged 69)
- Listed height: 6 ft 1 in (1.85 m)
- Listed weight: 212 lb (96 kg)

Career information
- High school: Clinton
- College: South Carolina
- NFL draft: 1977: 7th round, 195th overall pick

Career history
- New York Jets (1977–1981); Chicago Blitz (1983); Arizona Wranglers (1984); Arizona Outlaws (1985)

Career NFL statistics
- Rushing attempts: 574
- Rushing yards: 2,190
- Rushing TDs: 25
- Stats at Pro Football Reference

Kevin Fernando Long (January 20, 1955 – September 10, 2024) was an American professional football player who was a running back in the National Football League (NFL) and United States Football League (USFL). He played college football for the South Carolina Gamecocks.

== College ==
Long attended the University of South Carolina and was a standout fullback for the Gamecocks. He rushed for 2,372 yards, ranked eighth overall on Carolina's all-time list as of 2006. His average per rush was 5.3 yards and he was the first Gamecock player to compile 1,000 yards in a season (1975). In 2002, Long was inducted into the University of South Carolina Athletic Hall of Fame, and in 2003, into the State of South Carolina Athletic Hall of Fame.

== NFL/USFL ==
Long was selected in the 7th round (195th overall) by the New York Jets in the 1977 NFL draft and played five solid seasons for the Jets, until 1981. However, he is probably best remembered as a former USFL player. He played three seasons in the newly formed league, first for the Chicago Blitz in 1983, and then for the Arizona Wranglers in 1984. Due to the full-team trade that occurred during the first off-season between Chicago and Arizona, the 1984 Arizona team was basically the same team that had played in Chicago in 1983. After the 1984 season, Arizona then merged with the Oklahoma Outlaws franchise, and he played for the new Arizona Outlaws team in 1985.

== NFL career statistics ==
Legend
**Bold**	Career high

=== Regular season ===
Year	Team	Games		Rushing					Receiving				
Year	Team	GP	GS	Att	Yds	Avg	Lng	TD	Rec	Yds	Avg	Lng	TD
1977	NYJ	14	4	56	170	3.0	12	0	5	17	3.4	7	0
1978	NYJ	**16**	**16**	**214**	**954**	**4.5**	**27**	**10**	**26**	**204**	7.8	17	0
1979	NYJ	12	6	116	442	3.8	25	7	10	115	**11.5**	**27**	0
1980	NYJ	15	7	115	355	3.1	18	6	20	137	6.9	16	0
1981	NYJ	**16**	0	73	269	3.7	19	2	13	66	5.1	18	**3**
		73	33	574	2,190	3.8	27	25	74	539	7.3	27	3

=== Playoffs ===
Year	Team	Games		Rushing					Receiving				
Year	Team	GP	GS	Att	Yds	Avg	Lng	TD	Rec	Yds	Avg	Lng	TD
1981	NYJ	**1**	0	**8**	**28**	**3.5**	**8**	**1**	0	0	0.0	0	0
		1	0	8	28	3.5	8	1	0	0	0.0	0	0

== Personal life and death ==
Long worked in sales for a vending machine company. He was married and had three daughters. His eldest daughter won a track and field scholarship to the University of Georgia. His second daughter plays volleyball at the College of Charleston. Long died on September 10, 2024, at the age of 69.
