= Reggie Grant =

American football player (born 1955)

No. 49
- Position: Defensive back

Personal information
- Born: September 2, 1955 (age 71); Atlanta, Georgia, U.S.
- Listed height: 5 ft 9 in (1.75 m)
- Listed weight: 185 lb (84 kg)

Career information
- High school: Sealth (Seattle, Washington)
- College: Oregon (1974–1977)
- NFL draft: 1978: 9th round, 225th overall pick

Career history
- New York Jets (1978); Ottawa Rough Riders (1979)
- Stats at Pro Football Reference

Reginald Leon Grant (born September 2, 1955) is an American former professional football player who was a defensive back for one season with the New York Jets of the National Football League (NFL). He played college football for the Oregon Ducks and was selected by the Jets in the ninth round of the 1978 NFL draft. He was also a member of the Ottawa Rough Riders of the Canadian Football League (CFL).

== Early life and college ==
Reginald Leon Grant was born on September 2, 1955, in Atlanta, Georgia. He attended Chief Sealth International High School in Seattle, Washington.

Grant was a member of the Oregon Ducks of the University of Oregon from 1974 to 1977 and a three-year letterman from 1975 to 1977. In 1977, he recorded two interceptions for 20 yards, 12 kick returns for 187 yards, and four punt returns for 68 yards and a touchdown.

== Professional career ==
Grant was selected by the New York Jets in the ninth round, with the 225th overall pick, of the 1978 NFL draft. He officially signed with the team on June 19. He was released on September 20 but re-signed seven days later. Overall, Grant played in 14 games for the Jets during the 1978 season. He was released on August 21, 1979.

Grant played in one game for the Ottawa Rough Riders of the Canadian Football League in 1979.
