= Leonard Taylor III =

American football player (born 2002)

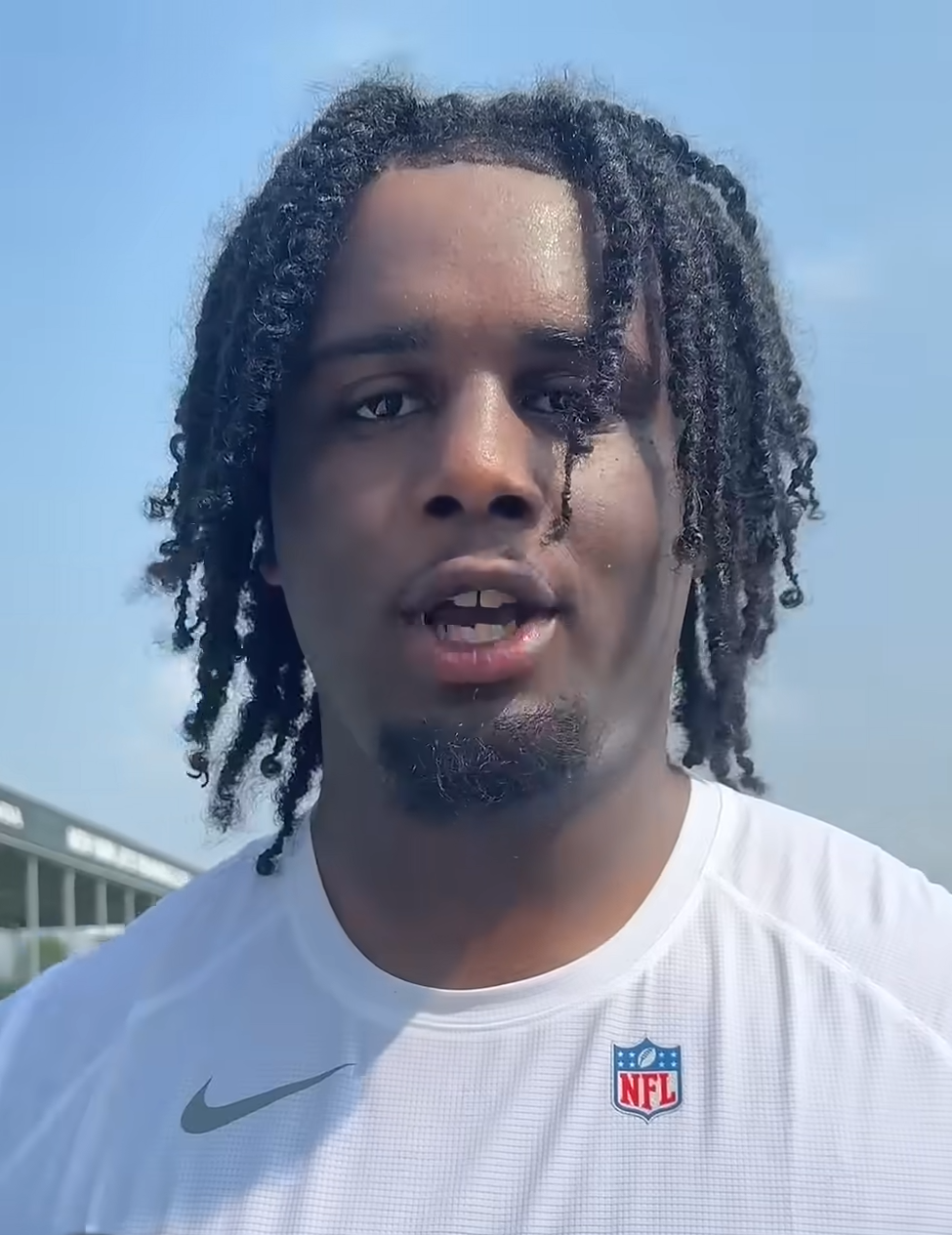
- Taylor with the New York Jets in 2025

No. 93 – New England Patriots
- Position: Defensive tackle
- Roster status: Active

Personal information
- Born: May 29, 2002 (age 24); Miami, Florida, U.S.
- Listed height: 6 ft 3 in (1.91 m)
- Listed weight: 305 lb (138 kg)

Career information
- High school: Miami Palmetto (Pinecrest, Florida)
- College: Miami (FL) (2021–2023)
- NFL draft: 2024: undrafted

Career history
- New York Jets (2024–2025); New England Patriots (2025–present)

Career NFL statistics as of 2025
- Tackles: 35
- Sacks: 1.5
- Pass deflections: 2
- Stats at Pro Football Reference

Leonard Taylor III (born May 29, 2002) is an American professional football defensive tackle for the New England Patriots of the National Football League (NFL). He played college football for the Miami Hurricanes.

== Early life ==
Taylor was born on May 29, 2002, in Miami, Florida, and attended Miami Palmetto Senior High School in Pinecrest, Florida. As a senior, he had 51 tackles, five sacks and an interception in seven games. He was selected to play in both the 2021 Under Armour All-America Game and 2021 All-American Bowl. A five-star recruit, Taylor committed to the University of Miami to play college football.

== College career ==
Taylor played in nine games as a true freshman at Miami in 2021, recording 21 tackles and two sacks. As a junior in 2022, he had 24 tackles, three sacks and an interception. Taylor declared for the 2024 NFL draft following the 2023 season.

== Professional career ==
Pre-draft measurables
Height	Weight	Arm length	Hand span	Wingspan	40-yard dash	10-yard split	20-yard split	20-yard shuttle	Three-cone drill	Vertical jump	Broad jump
6 ft 3 1/2 in (1.92 m)	303 lb (137 kg)	33 7/8 in (0.86 m)	9 in (0.23 m)	6 ft 8 5/8 in (2.05 m)	5.12 s	1.76 s	2.96 s	4.71 s	7.68 s	30.0 in (0.76 m)	9 ft 1 in (2.77 m)
All values from NFL Combine/Pro Day

=== New York Jets ===
Taylor signed with the New York Jets as an undrafted free agent on May 3, 2024. Taylor made the Jets' 53-man roster out of training camp. He made 14 appearances for New York during his rookie campaign, recording one pass deflection, 1.5 sacks, and 24 combined tackles.

Taylor played in two games for the Jets in 2025, logging one pass deflection and three combined tackles. On October 14, 2025, Taylor was waived by the Jets.

=== New England Patriots ===
On October 16, 2025, Taylor signed with the New England Patriots' practice squad. He made three regular season appearances for New England, compiling eight combined tackles.

In the AFC Championship against the Denver Broncos, Taylor tipped the ball on a game-tying field goal attempt by Broncos kicker Will Lutz in the fourth quarter. The Patriots would go on to win 10–7, advancing to Super Bowl LX. On February 11, 2026, he signed a reserve/futures contract with New England.
