= Treg Songy =

American football player (1962–2002)

No. 36, 21
- Position: Defensive back

Personal information
- Born: June 15, 1962; Houston, Texas, U.S.
- Died: December 13, 2002 (aged 40)
- Listed height: 6 ft 2 in (1.88 m)
- Listed weight: 200 lb (91 kg)

Career information
- High school: St. Augustine (New Orleans)
- College: Tulane (1981–1984)
- NFL draft: 1985: 12th round, 320th overall pick

Career history
- New Orleans Saints (1985)*; Ottawa Rough Riders (1986); New York Jets (1987)
- * Offseason or practice squad member only
- Stats at Pro Football Reference

Treg Joseph Songy (Tray; June 15, 1962 – December 13, 2002) was an American professional football player who was a defensive back for the New York Jets of the National Football League (NFL). He played college football for the Tulane Green Wave and was selected by the New Orleans Saints in the 12th round of the 1985 NFL draft.

== Early life ==
Treg Joseph Songy was born on June 15, 1962, in Houston, Texas. He grew up as a New Orleans Saints fan. In 1970, he was selling popcorn in Tulane Stadium when Tom Dempsey kicked his NFL-record 63-yard field goal. Songy played high school football at St. Augustine High School in New Orleans, Louisiana, winning the state title in 1978 and 1979.

== College career ==
In December 1980, Songy committed to Tulane University to play college football. He was a four-year starter and four-year letterman at safety for the Green Wave from 1981 to 1984. In his first college game on September 5, 1981, against Ole Miss, he gave up a game-winning touchdown with a minute left. Songy drew criticism for taunting during the 1984 season. He played in 42 career games, and had five interceptions for 145 yards and one touchdown.

== Professional career ==
Scouts told Songy he would be selected in the third or fourth round of the 1985 NFL draft. As the draft went on and Songy was not selected, he fell asleep. He was awoken by a phone call from New Orleans Saints' scouting director Joe Wooley. Songy, thinking it was a prank, replied "Yeah, Joe, this is Joe Esposito." Songy was then selected by the Saints in the 12th round, with the 320th overall pick. He was released on August 19, 1985, after the second preseason game.

Songy signed with the Ottawa Rough Riders of the Canadian Football League (CFL) for the 1986 CFL season. He played in six games for the Rough Riders, recording one interception for 18 yards. He also spent some time on the practice roster. Songy was released on October 1, 1986.

On September 23, 1987, Songy was signed by the New York Jets during the 1987 NFL players strike. He played in two games for the Jets as a reserve cornerback. He was released on October 19, 1987, after the strike ended.

== Death ==
Songy died on December 13, 2002.
