= Jim Earley =

American football player (born 1956)

No. 47
- Position: Running back

Personal information
- Born: January 23, 1956 (age 70); Dayton, Ohio, U.S.
- Listed height: 6 ft 1 in (1.85 m)
- Listed weight: 230 lb (104 kg)

Career information
- High school: Dunbar (Dayton)
- College: Michigan State (1974–1977)
- NFL draft: 1978: 7th round, 170th overall pick

Career history
- New York Jets (1978)
- Stats at Pro Football Reference

James H. Earley (born January 23, 1956) is an American former professional football player who was a running back for one season with the New York Jets of the National Football League (NFL). He played college football for the Michigan State Spartans and was selected by the Jets in the seventh round of the 1978 NFL draft.

== Early life ==
James H. Earley was born on January 23, 1956, in Dayton, Ohio. He attended Dunbar High School in Dayton.

== College career ==
Earley was a four-year letterman for the Michigan State Spartans of Michigan State University from 1974 to 1977. He rushed 22 times for 122 yards as a freshman in 1974. In 1975, he recorded 23 carries for 151 yards and one touchdown. Earley totaled 64 rushing attempts for 354 yards and one touchdown during the 1976 season while also catching five passes for 42 yards. As a senior in 1976, he recorded 109 rushing attempts for 668 yards, three touchdowns, and a Big Ten-leading 6.1 yards per attempt while also totaling 17 receptions for 148 yards and one touchdown.

== Professional career ==
Earley was selected by the New York Jets in the seventh round, with the 170th overall pick, of the 1978 NFL draft. He played in two games during the 1978 season before being placed on injured reserve on October 4, 1978. He retired on July 12, 1979.
