= Nick Kowgios =

American football player (born 1962)

No. 30
- Position: Running back

Personal information
- Born: November 19, 1962 (age 63); Yonkers, New York, U.S.
- Listed height: 6 ft 0 in (1.83 m)
- Listed weight: 216 lb (98 kg)

Career information
- High school: Hackley (Tarrytown, New York)
- College: Lafayette
- NFL draft: 1985: undrafted

Career history
- New York Giants (1985)*; Detroit Lions (1987)
- * Offseason or practice squad member only

Career NFL statistics
- Rushing yards: 2
- Rushing average: 2
- Receptions: 1
- Receiving yards: 3
- Stats at Pro Football Reference

Nicholas Kowgios (born November 19, 1962) is an American former professional football player who was a running back for the Detroit Lions of the National Football League (NFL). He played college football for the Lafayette Leopards.
