= Larry Miller (American football) =

American football player (born 1962)

No. 5
- Position: Quarterback

Personal information
- Born: February 8, 1962 (age 64); Chicago, Illinois, U.S.
- Listed height: 6 ft 4 in (1.93 m)
- Listed weight: 220 lb (100 kg)

Career information
- College: Northern Iowa
- NFL draft: 1985: undrafted

Career history
- Minnesota Vikings (1987)

Career NFL statistics
- Passing completions: 1
- Passing attempts: 6
- Completion %: 16.7
- TD–INT: 0–1
- Passer rating: 0
- Stats at Pro Football Reference

Lawrence Miller (born February 8, 1962) is an American former professional football player who was a quarterback for the Minnesota Vikings of the National Football League (NFL). He played college football for the Northern Iowa Panthers.
