= Chuck Ramsey =

American football player (born 1952)

No. 15
- Position: Punter

Personal information
- Born: February 24, 1952 (age 74); Rock Hill, South Carolina, U.S.
- Listed height: 6 ft 2 in (1.88 m)
- Listed weight: 191 lb (87 kg)

Career information
- High school: West (TN)
- College: Wake Forest
- NFL draft: 1974: 6th round, 141st overall pick

Career history
- New York Jets (1977–1984)

Awards and highlights
- First-team All-American (1973); 2× First-team All-ACC (1972, 1973)

Career NFL statistics
- Punts: 553
- Punt yards: 22,128
- Longest punt: 79
- Stats at Pro Football Reference

Lowell Wallace "Chuck" Ramsey (born February 24, 1952), is an American former professional football player who was a punter for eight seasons with the New York Jets of the National Football League (NFL). Previously he played with the Chicago Fire of the World Football League (WFL).

During his time as a Jet, in fact, throughout his entire NFL career, he averaged exactly 40 yards per punt and only had 4 punts blocked. He punted 553 times for 22,128 yards. He averaged 42.4 yards per punt in 1980, and his longest punt was 79 yards in his first full season, 1978.

== NFL career statistics ==
Legend
**Bold**	Career high

=== Regular season ===
Year	Team	Punting									
Year	Team	GP	Punts	Yds	Net Yds	Lng	Avg	Net Avg	Blk	Ins20	TB
1977	NYJ	12	62	2,298	1,837	61	37.1	29.6	0	8	8
1978	NYJ	**16**	74	2,964	2,215	**79**	40.1	29.9	0	9	7
1979	NYJ	**16**	73	2,979	2,519	64	40.8	34.5	0	22	10
1980	NYJ	**16**	73	3,096	2,527	59	**42.4**	34.1	**1**	15	10
1981	NYJ	**16**	**81**	**3,290**	**2,881**	65	40.6	**35.6**	0	**26**	**13**
1982	NYJ	9	35	1,348	1,155	54	38.5	32.1	**1**	8	2
1983	NYJ	**16**	**81**	3,218	2,751	56	39.7	33.5	**1**	17	5
1984	NYJ	**16**	74	2,935	2,533	64	39.7	33.8	**1**	19	8
Career		117	553	22,128	18,418	79	40.0	33.1	4	124	63

=== Playoffs ===
Year	Team	Punting									
Year	Team	GP	Punts	Yds	Net Yds	Lng	Avg	Net Avg	Blk	Ins20	TB
1981	NYJ	1	4	132	121	41	33.0	30.3	0	0	0
1982	NYJ	**2**	**11**	**420**	**400**	**47**	**38.2**	**33.3**	**1**	**3**	0
Career		3	15	552	521	47	36.8	32.6	1	3	0
