= Al Palewicz =

American football player (born 1950)

No. 57, 53
- Position: Linebacker

Personal information
- Born: March 23, 1950 (age 76); Fort Worth, Texas, U.S.
- Listed height: 6 ft 1 in (1.85 m)
- Listed weight: 215 lb (98 kg)

Career information
- High school: Pinecrest (FL) Miami Palmetto
- College: Miami (FL)
- NFL draft: 1973: 8th round, 197th overall pick

Career history
- Kansas City Chiefs (1973–1975); New York Jets (1977)
- Stats at Pro Football Reference

Al Palewicz (born March 23, 1950) is an American former professional football player who was a linebacker in the National Football League (NFL). He played college football for the Miami Hurricanes. Palewicz played in the NFL for the Kansas City Chiefs from 1973 to 1975 and New York Jets in 1977.
