= Mark Merrill =

American football player (1955–2018)

No. 58, 50, 59, 62, 52
- Position: Linebacker

Personal information
- Born: May 5, 1955; Hennepin County, Minnesota, U.S.
- Died: April 12, 2018 (aged 62); New Brighton, Minnesota, U.S.
- Listed height: 6 ft 4 in (1.93 m)
- Listed weight: 237 lb (108 kg)

Career information
- College: Minnesota
- NFL draft: 1978: 2nd round, 31st overall pick

Career history
- New York Jets (1978–1979); Chicago Bears (1979); Denver Broncos (1981–1982); Green Bay Packers (1982); Buffalo Bills (1983–1984); Los Angeles Raiders (1984)

Awards and highlights
- Second-team All-Big Ten (1977)

Career NFL statistics
- Sacks: 1
- Fumble recoveries: 2
- Stats at Pro Football Reference

Mark Merrill (May 5, 1955 – April 12, 2018) was a linebacker in the National Football League (NFL). His parents are Verna Anderson Merrill and Walter Leo Kelly Merrill.

== Career ==
Merrill was drafted in the second round of the 1978 NFL draft by the New York Jets with the 31st overall pick. He split that season between the Jets and the Chicago Bears. After a season away from the NFL, he would spend the 1981 NFL season with the Denver Broncos before splitting the following year between the Broncos and the Green Bay Packers. He spent the next season with the Buffalo Bills before once again splitting the next seasons, this time between the Bills and the Los Angeles Raiders.

He played at the collegiate level at the University of Minnesota.
