= Bruce Stephens =

American football player (born 1956)

No. 87
- Position: Wide receiver

Personal information
- Born: October 31, 1956 (age 70); Columbus, Georgia, U.S.
- Listed height: 5 ft 9 in (1.75 m)
- Listed weight: 170 lb (77 kg)

Career information
- High school: Central (Phenix City, Alabama)
- College: Columbia
- NFL draft: 1978: undrafted

Career history
- New York Jets (1978)
- Stats at Pro Football Reference

Bruce Anthony Stephens (born October 31, 1956) is an American former professional football player who was a wide receiver for the New York Jets of the National Football League (NFL). He played college football for the Columbia Lions.

Born in Columbus, Georgia, Stephens attended Central High School of Clay County in Lineville, Alabama. In addition to playing football, he was also a sprinter, running a 9.8 100-meter dash. Although recruited to play college football for teams such as the Georgia Bulldogs, Army Black Knights and Princeton Tigers, Stephens walked-on with the Columbia Lions and made the freshman team in 1974. He then became a starting running back for the varsity team in 1975 and was a top player at the school through 1977. A member of the Alpha Phi Alpha fraternity, Stephens was an honor society student at Columbia and was named the football team's most valuable player as a senior in 1977, graduating in 1978 with a degree in economics.

Stephens went unselected in the 1978 NFL draft, but was signed as an undrafted free agent by the New York Jets to play wide receiver. He made the team out of training camp as a return specialist. He appeared in six games and had three kickoff returns for 42 yards with a long of 16, although in one game he had a 68-yard return that was called back by penalty. He was placed on injured reserve in October, ending his season. He was the team's returner in preseason in 1979 but was released after fumbling a kickoff.
