= Mike Mock =

Norwegian gridiron football player (born 1955)

No. 50
- Position: Linebacker

Personal information
- Born: February 25, 1955 (age 71); Trondheim, Norway
- Listed height: 6 ft 1 in (1.85 m)
- Listed weight: 225 lb (102 kg)

Career information
- High school: Longview (TX)
- College: Texas Tech
- NFL draft: 1978: 8th round, 203rd overall pick

Career history
- New York Jets (1978)

Awards and highlights
- First-team All-SWC (1977)

Career NFL statistics
- Games played: 15
- Stats at Pro Football Reference

Michael Earl Mock (born February 25, 1955) is a former American football linebacker. He played for the New York Jets in 1978. He was selected by the Jets in the eighth round of the 1978 NFL draft with the 203rd overall pick.
