= Charlie White (American football) =

American football player (born 1953)

No. 30, 28
- Position: Running back

Personal information
- Born: August 31, 1953 (age 73); Suffern, New York, U.S.
- Listed height: 6 ft 0 in (1.83 m)
- Listed weight: 222 lb (101 kg)

Career information
- High school: Spring Valley (Spring Valley, New York)
- College: Bethune–Cookman
- NFL draft: 1977: 7th round, 168th overall pick

Career history
- New York Jets (1977); Tampa Bay Buccaneers (1978); San Diego Chargers (1979)*; Baltimore Colts (1980)*
- * Offseason or practice squad member only
- Stats at Pro Football Reference

Charles Frankie White (born August 31, 1953) is an American former professional football running back who played in the National Football League (NFL) with the New York Jets and Tampa Bay Buccaneers. He played college football for the Bethune–Cookman Wildcats and was selected by the Jets in the seventh round of the 1977 NFL draft.

== Early life ==
Charles Frankie White was born on August 31, 1953, in Suffern, New York. He participated in football and track at Spring Valley High School in Spring Valley, New York.

== College career ==
White played two years of junior college football at Iowa Central Community College. He then had a brief stint at Colorado State University but left the team because he did not like how the head coach discplined players. White transferred to Bethune–Cookman College, where he played two seasons with the Wildcats. He scored 12 career touchdowns at Bethune–Cookman while averaging 7.4 yards-per-carry. He was also used as a blocking back.

== Professional career ==
White was selected by the New York Jets in the seventh round, with the 168th overall pick, of the 1977 NFL draft. He played in 13 games, starting four, at running back for the Jets during the 1977 season, totaling 50 carries for 151 yards and one touchdown, two receptions on four targets for five yards and one touchdown, and two fumbles. He was released on August 24, 1978, before the final preseason game.

White signed with the Tampa Bay Buccaneers on November 1, 1978. He appeared in seven games, starting one, at fullback for Tampa Bay in 1978, recording 11 rushes for 42 yards, two catches on three targets for 31 yards, one fumble, and one fumble recovery.

On May 31, 1979, White was traded to the San Diego Chargers for an undisclosed draft pick. He was released on August 15, 1979, after the second of four preseason games.

White signed with the Baltimore Colts on February 27, 1980. He was released on August 12 after the first game of the 1980 preseason.

== Personal life ==
White is a member of the Rockland County Sports Hall of Fame. He owned a construction business for 20 years before retiring in 2017.
