= Tim Moresco =

American football player (born 1954)

No. 37
- Position: Safety

Personal information
- Born: October 3, 1954 (age 72); Ithaca, New York, U.S.
- Listed height: 5 ft 11 in (1.80 m)
- Listed weight: 176 lb (80 kg)

Career information
- High school: Ithaca
- College: Syracuse
- NFL draft: 1977: 6th round, 149th overall pick

Career history
- Green Bay Packers (1977); New York Jets (1978–1980)

Awards and highlights
- First-team All-East (1976)

Career NFL statistics
- Fumble recoveries: 2
- Sacks: 1
- Safeties: 1
- Stats at Pro Football Reference

Tim Moresco (born October 3, 1954) is an American former professional football player who was a safety in the National Football League (NFL). He played college football for the Syracuse Orange. Moresco was selected by the Green Bay Packers in the sixth round of the 1977 NFL draft and played that season with the team. The following three seasons he would play with the New York Jets.
