= Bob Ledbetter =

American football player and coach (1934–1983)

Biographical details
- Born: September 24, 1934; Tupelo, Mississippi, U.S.
- Died: October 7, 1983 (aged 49); Smithtown, New York, U.S.
- Education: Mississippi Industrial

Coaching career (HC unless noted)
- 1968–1971: Southern Illinois (assistant)
- 1972–1973: Norfolk State
- 1974–1975: New Orleans Saints (RB)
- 1977–1982: New York Jets (RB)
- 1983: New York Giants (RB)

Head coaching record
- Overall: 8–12

Robert Ledbetter (September 24, 1933 – October 7, 1983) was an American football player and coach. He served as the head football coach at Norfolk State University from 1972 to 1973, compiling a record of 8–12.

== Head coaching record ==
Year	Team	Overall	Conference	Standing	Bowl/playoffs
Norfolk State Spartans (Central Intercollegiate Athletic Association) (1972–1973)
1972	Norfolk State	3–7	3–2	T–2nd (Northern)	
1973	Norfolk State	5–5	5–3	3rd	
Norfolk State:		8–12	8–5		
Total:		8–12			
