= Bob Raba =

American football player (born 1955)

No. 86, 85, 91
- Position: Tight end

Personal information
- Born: April 23, 1955 (age 71); Washington, D.C., U.S.
- Listed height: 6 ft 1 in (1.85 m)
- Listed weight: 222 lb (101 kg)

Career information
- High school: Walt Whitman
- College: Maryland
- NFL draft: 1977: undrafted

Career history
- New York Jets (1977–1979); Baltimore Colts (1980); Washington Redskins (1981)
- Stats at Pro Football Reference

Robert William Raba (born April 23, 1955) is an American former professional football player who was a tight end in the National Football League (NFL) for the New York Jets, the Baltimore Colts, and the Washington Redskins. He played college football for the Maryland Terrapins.
