= Ed Taylor (American football) =

American football player (born 1953)

No. 38, 45
- Position: Cornerback

Personal information
- Born: May 13, 1953 (age 73); Memphis, Tennessee, U.S.
- Listed height: 6 ft 0 in (1.83 m)
- Listed weight: 174 lb (79 kg)

Career information
- High school: South Side (TN)
- College: Memphis
- NFL draft: 1975: 9th round, 224th overall pick

Career history
- New York Jets (1975–1979); Miami Dolphins (1979–1981)

Career NFL statistics
- Interceptions: 8
- INT yards: 77
- Fumble recoveries: 2
- Stats at Pro Football Reference

Everett Earl "Ed" Taylor (born May 13, 1953) is an American former professional football player who was a defensive back in the National Football League (NFL). He played college football for the Memphis Tigers and was selected by the New York Jets in the ninth round of the 1975 NFL draft.

Taylor also played for the Miami Dolphins.

Competing for the Memphis Tigers track and field team, Taylor won the 1973 NCAA University Division Outdoor Track and Field Championships in the 4 × 110 yard relay.
