= Gregg Robinson =

American football player (born 1956)

No. 64
- Position: Defensive end

Personal information
- Born: August 16, 1956 (age 70); Palmer, Massachusetts, U.S.
- Listed height: 6 ft 6 in (1.98 m)
- Listed weight: 255 lb (116 kg)

Career information
- High school: Minnechaug Regional
- College: Dartmouth
- NFL draft: 1978: 6th round, 142nd overall pick

Career history
- New York Jets (1978)
- Stats at Pro Football Reference

Gregg Alan Robinson (born August 16, 1956) is an American former professional football player who was a defensive end for the New York Jets of National Football League (NFL). He played college football for the Dartmouth College.
