= Tom Newton =

American football player (born 1954)

Profile
- Position: Running back

Personal information
- Born: March 8, 1954 (age 72); Carmel, Florida, U.S.

Career information
- College: California

Career history
- 1977–1982: New York Jets
- 1984–1985: Oakland Raiders
- Stats at Pro Football Reference

Tom Newton (born March 8, 1954) is an American former professional football player who was a running back in the National Football League (NFL) for six seasons with the New York Jets and two seasons for the Oakland Raiders. He played college football for the California Golden Bears. He finished his NFL career with a total of 772 yards and nine touchdowns.

Newton was born in Carmel, Florida, and has one child, a daughter named Khalishia Newton.
