= 1983 New York Jets season =

1983 season of NFL team New York Jets

- Owner: Leon Hess
- Head coach: Joe Walton
- Home stadium: Shea Stadium

Results
- Record: 7–9
- Division place: 5th AFC East
- Playoffs: Did not qualify
- Pro Bowlers: T Marvin Powell; DT Joe Klecko; DE Mark Gastineau

The 1983 New York Jets season was the 24th season for the team and the 14th in the National Football League. It began with the team trying to improve upon its 6–3 record from 1982 and return to the playoffs under first-year head coach Joe Walton. The Jets, who finished the season with a record of 7–9, played their twentieth and final season at Shea Stadium before relocating their home games to Giants Stadium in East Rutherford, New Jersey, starting with the following season.

== Roster ==
1983 New York Jets roster
| Quarterbacks (QB): 16 Ken O'Brien; 10 Pat Ryan; 14 Richard Todd; Running backs (RB): 31 Marion Barber; 25 Scott Dierking; 42 Bruce Harper; 34 Johnny Hector; 30 Rocky Klever; 22 Kenny Lewis; 24 Freeman McNeil; Wide receivers (WR): 89 Preston Brown; 86 Nick Bruckner; 81 Derrick Gaffney; 80 Lam Jones; 85 Wesley Walker; Tight ends (TE): 83 Jerome Barkum; 88 Tom Coombs; 82 Mickey Shuler | Offensive linemen (OL): 60 Dan Alexander G; 64 Guy Bingham C/G; 65 Joe Fields C; 59 George Lilja C; 68 Reggie McElroy G/T; 62 Joe Pellegrini G; 79 Marvin Powell T; 72 Chris Ward T; Defensive linemen (DL): 78 Barry Bennett DT; 99 Mark Gastineau DE; 94 Rusty Guilbeau DE; 73 Joe Klecko DT; 93 Marty Lyons DE; 77 Kenny Neil DE; 76 Ben Rudolph DT/DE; 74 Abdul Salaam DT | Linebackers (LB): 54 Stan Blinka MLB; 50 Bob Crable MLB; 55 Ron Crosby OLB; 52 Jim Eliopulos OLB; 56 Lance Mehl OLB; 57 John Woodring OLB; Defensive backs (DB): 47 Jerry Holmes CB; 40 Bobby Jackson CB; 29 Johnny Lynn CB; 20 Davlin Mullen CB; 28 Darrol Ray FS; 48 Ken Schroy SS; 21 Kirk Springs FS; Special teams (ST): 5 Pat Leahy K; 15 Chuck Ramsey P | Reserve: 35 Mike Augustyniak RB (IR); 63 Ted Banker C (IR); 51 Greg Buttle LB (IR); 37 Marcene Emmett S (IR); 38 George Floyd S (IR); 84 Bobby Humphery WR (IR); 27 Jesse Johnson S (IR); 71 Jim Luscinski T (IR); 87 Kurt Sohn WR (IR); 70 Stan Waldemore G (IR); 90 John Walker DT (IR); Rookies in italics |

== Regular season ==
=== Schedule ===
| Week | Date | Opponent | Result | Record | Venue | Attendance |
|---|---|---|---|---|---|---|
| 1 | September 4 | at San Diego Chargers | **W** 41–29 | 1–0 | Jack Murphy Stadium | 51,004 |
| 2 | September 11 | Seattle Seahawks | **L** 10–17 | 1–1 | Shea Stadium | 50,066 |
| 3 | September 18 | at **New England Patriots** | **L** 13–23 | 1–2 | Sullivan Stadium | 43,182 |
| 4 | September 25 | Los Angeles Rams | **W** 27–24 (OT) | 2–2 | Shea Stadium | 52,070 |
| 5 | October 3 | at **Buffalo Bills** | **W** 34–10 | 3–2 | Rich Stadium | 79,933 |
| 6 | October 9 | at Cleveland Browns | **L** 7–10 | 3–3 | Cleveland Municipal Stadium | 78,235 |
| 7 | October 16 | **Miami Dolphins** | **L** 14–32 | 3–4 | Shea Stadium | 58,615 |
| 8 | October 23 | Atlanta Falcons | **L** 21–27 | 3–5 | Shea Stadium | 46,878 |
| 9 | October 30 | at San Francisco 49ers | **W** 27–13 | 4–5 | Candlestick Park | 54,796 |
| 10 | November 6 | **Baltimore Colts** | **L** 14–17 | 4–6 | Shea Stadium | 53,323 |
| 11 | November 13 | **Buffalo Bills** | **L** 17–24 | 4–7 | Shea Stadium | 48,513 |
| 12 | November 21 | at New Orleans Saints | **W** 31–28 | 5–7 | Louisiana Superdome | 68,606 |
| 13 | November 27 | **New England Patriots** | **W** 26–3 | 6–7 | Shea Stadium | 48,620 |
| 14 | December 4 | at **Baltimore Colts** | **W** 10–6 | 7–7 | Memorial Stadium | 35,462 |
| 15 | December 10 | Pittsburgh Steelers | **L** 7–34 | 7–8 | Shea Stadium | 53,996 |
| 16 | December 16 | at **Miami Dolphins** | **L** 14–34 | 7–9 | Miami Orange Bowl | 59,975 |
Note: Intra-division opponents are in **bold** text.

=== Standings ===
AFC East
| | W | L | T | PCT | DIV | CONF | PF | PA | STK |
|---|---|---|---|---|---|---|---|---|---|
| ^{(2)} Miami Dolphins | 12 | 4 | 0 | .750 | 6–2 | 9–3 | 389 | 250 | W5 |
| New England Patriots | 8 | 8 | 0 | .500 | 4–4 | 6–6 | 274 | 289 | L1 |
| Buffalo Bills | 8 | 8 | 0 | .500 | 4–4 | 7–5 | 283 | 351 | L2 |
| Baltimore Colts | 7 | 9 | 0 | .438 | 3–5 | 5–9 | 264 | 354 | W1 |
| New York Jets | 7 | 9 | 0 | .438 | 3–5 | 4–8 | 313 | 331 | L2 |

=== Game summaries ===
==== Week 4 ====
| Team | 1 | 2 | 3 | 4 | OT | Total |
|---|---|---|---|---|---|---|
| Rams | 14 | 0 | 3 | 7 | 0 | 24 |
| • Jets | 7 | 7 | 7 | 3 | 3 | 27 |

- Date: September 25
- Location: Shea Stadium, Flushing, New York
- Game start: 4:00 p.m. EDT
- Game weather: 60 °F (15.6 °C); wind 10 miles per hour (16 km/h; 8.7 kn)
- Referee: Fred Silva
- TV announcers (CBS): Pat Summerall and John Madden

Scoring summary
| 1 | LA | Eric Dickerson 85 yard run (Chuck Nelson kick) | LA 7–0 |
| 1 | NYJ | Wesley Walker 15 yard pass from Richard Todd (Pat Leahy kick) | Tie 7–7 |
| 1 | LA | Eric Dickerson 5 yard run (Chuck Nelson kick) | LA 14–7 |
| 2 | NYJ | Jerry Holmes 57 yard blocked field goal return (Pat Leahy kick) | Tie 14–14 |
| 3 | LA | Chuck Nelson 34 yard field goal | LA 17–14 |
| 3 | NYJ | Wesley Walker 37 yard pass from Richard Todd (Pat Leahy kick) | NYJ 21–17 |
| 4 | NYJ | Pat Leahy 22 yard field goal | NYJ 24–17 |
| 4 | LA | Mike Guman 2 yard pass from Vince Ferragamo (Chuck Nelson kick) | Tie 24–24 |
| OT | NYJ | Pat Leahy 26 yard field goal | NYJ 27–24 |

The game is notable for a melee that broke out between the two teams after Jackie Slater shoved Mark Gastineau in response to the latter performing his signature "Sack Dance" when making a play on Rams quarterback Vince Ferragamo. In all, 37 players would be fined a total of $15,750 as a result, while the NFL deemed Gastineau's celebration "unsportsmanlike conduct" and banned it the following offseason.

==== Week 15 ====
| Quarter | 1 | 2 | 3 | 4 | Total |
|---|---|---|---|---|---|
| **Steelers** | 7 | 13 | 7 | 7 | **34** |
| Jets | 0 | 0 | 7 | 0 | **7** |

at Shea Stadium, Flushing, New York

- Date: December 10
- Game time: 12:30 p.m. EST
- Game weather: 45 °F (7.2 °C), wind 12 miles per hour (19 km/h; 10 kn)
- Game attendance: 53,996
- Referee: Bob McElwee
- TV announcers (NBC): Dick Enberg and Merlin Olsen
- Box Score

Scoring summary

| Quarter | Time | Drive | | | Team | Scoring information | Score | |
| Quarter | Time | Plays | Yards | TOP | Team | Scoring information | Steelers | Jets |
|---|---|---|---|---|---|---|---|---|
| 1 | | | | | Steelers | Gregg Garrity 17-yard touchdown reception from Terry Bradshaw, Gary Anderson kick good | 7 | 0 |
| 2 | | | | | Steelers | Calvin Sweeney 10-yard touchdown reception from Terry Bradshaw, Gary Anderson kick good | 14 | 0 |
| 2 | | | | | Steelers | 29-yard field goal by Gary Anderson | 17 | 0 |
| 2 | | | | | Steelers | 40-yard field goal by Gary Anderson | 20 | 0 |
| 3 | | | | | Steelers | Bennie Cunningham 13-yard touchdown reception from Cliff Stoudt, Gary Anderson kick good | 27 | 0 |
| 3 | | | | | Jets | Johnny Lam Jones 27-yard touchdown reception from Pat Ryan, Pat Leahy kick good | 27 | 7 |
| 4 | | | | | Steelers | Calvin Sweeney 18-yard touchdown reception from Cliff Stoudt, Gary Anderson kick good | 34 | 7 |
| "TOP" = time of possession. For other American football terms, see Glossary of American football. | | | | | | | 34 | 7 |

Last home game played at Shea Stadium
