= 1982 New York Jets season =

1982 season of NFL team New York Jets

- Owner: Leon Hess
- Head coach: Walt Michaels
- Offensive coordinator: Joe Walton
- Defensive coordinator: Joe Gardi
- Home stadium: Shea Stadium

Results
- Record: 6–3
- Division place: 6th AFC
- Playoffs: Won Wild card playoffs (at Bengals) 44–17; Won Divisional Playoffs (at Raiders) 17–14; Lost AFC Championship (at Dolphins) 0–14
- Pro Bowlers: C Joe Fields; T Marvin Powell; WR Wesley Walker; RB Freeman McNeil; DE Mark Gastineau

The 1982 New York Jets season was the 23rd season for the franchise and its 13th in the National Football League. It began with the team trying to improve upon its 10–5–1 record from 1981 and return to the playoffs under head coach Walt Michaels. The season was marred by an eight-week players’ strike, cancelling eight scheduled games (one game was made up at the end of the season), and eliminating divisional play for the season; the top eight teams from each conference advanced to the playoffs. The Jets finished the season with a record of 6–3 and sixth place in the American Football Conference. They defeated the Cincinnati Bengals 44–17 and Los Angeles Raiders 17–14 in the first two rounds of the playoffs to advance to their first AFC Championship Game. There, they fell to their division rivals, the Miami Dolphins, 14–0.

== Offseason ==
=== Draft ===
1982 New York Jets draft
Round	Pick	Player	Position	College	Notes
1	23	Bob Crable	LB	Notre Dame	
2	51	Reggie McElroy	OT	West Texas State	
3	79	Dwayne Crutchfield	RB	Iowa State	
4	107	George Floyd	DB	Eastern Kentucky	
5	135	Mark Jerue	LB	Washington	
6	163	Lonell Phea	WR	Houston	
7	191	Tom Coombs	TE	Idaho	
8	219	Lawrence Texada	RB	Henderson State	
9	247	Rocky Klever	RB	Montana	
10	275	Darryl Hemphill	DB	West Texas State	
11	302	Perry Parmelee	WR	Santa Clara	
12	330	Tom Carlstrom	G	Nebraska	
Made roster † Pro Football Hall of Fame * Made at least one Pro Bowl during career

=== Undrafted free agents ===
1982 undrafted free agents of note
Player	Position	College
Dan DeLia	Defensive back	Boston University

== Roster ==
1982 New York Jets roster
Quarterbacks (QB): 10 Pat Ryan; 14 Richard Todd; Running backs (RB): 35 Mike Augustyniak; 31 Marion Barber; 45 Dwayne Crutchfield; 25 Scott Dierking; 42 Bruce Harper; 24 Freeman McNeil; 44 Tom Newton; Wide receivers (WR): 81 Derrick Gaffney; 86 Bobby Jones; 80 Lam Jones; 87 Kurt Sohn; 85 Wesley Walker; Tight ends (TE): 83 Jerome Barkum; 88 Tom Coombs; 82 Mickey Shuler	Offensive linemen (OL): 60 Dan Alexander G; 64 Guy Bingham C/G; 65 Joe Fields C; 71 Jim Luscinski T; 62 Joe Pellegrini C/G; 79 Marvin Powell T; 61 John Roman T; 70 Stan Waldemore G; 72 Chris Ward T; Defensive linemen (DL): 78 Barry Bennett DT; 99 Mark Gastineau DE; 94 Rusty Guilbeau DE; 93 Marty Lyons DT; 77 Kenny Neil DE; 76 Ben Rudolph DT; 74 Abdul Salaam DT	Linebackers (LB): 54 Stan Blinka MLB; 51 Greg Buttle OLB; 50 Bob Crable OLB; 55 Ron Crosby OLB; 56 Lance Mehl OLB; 57 John Woodring MLB; Defensive backs (DB): 38 George Floyd FS; 47 Jerry Holmes CB; 40 Bobby Jackson CB; 27 Jesse Johnson SS; 29 Johnny Lynn CB; 28 Darrol Ray FS; 48 Ken Schroy SS; 21 Kirk Springs CB/S; Special teams (ST): 5 Pat Leahy K; 15 Chuck Ramsey P	Reserve: 91 Charles Cook DT (IR); 58 Mark Jerue LB (IR); 73 Joe Klecko DE (IR); 30 Rocky Klever RB (IR); 68 Reggie McElroy G (IR); 34 John Nitti RB (IR); Rookies in italics

== Schedule ==
=== Regular season ===
Week	Original week	Date	Opponent	Result	Record	Venue	Attendance
1	1	September 12	**Miami Dolphins**	**L** 28–45	0–1	Shea Stadium	53,360
2	2	September 19	at **New England Patriots**	**W** 31–7	1–1	Schaefer Stadium	53,515
—	3	September 26	at Baltimore Colts		1–1	Memorial Stadium	Cancelled due to 1982 NFL players strike
—	4	October 3	Houston Oilers		1–1	Shea Stadium	Cancelled due to 1982 NFL players strike
—	5	October 10	Denver Broncos		1–1	Shea Stadium	Cancelled due to 1982 NFL players strike
—	6	October 18	Buffalo Bills		1–1	Shea Stadium	Cancelled due to 1982 NFL players strike
—	7	October 24	at Kansas City Chiefs		1–1	Arrowhead Stadium	Postponed
—	8	October 31	New England Patriots		1–1	Shea Stadium	Cancelled due to 1982 NFL players strike
—	9	November 7	at Buffalo Bills		1–1	Rich Stadium	Cancelled due to 1982 NFL players strike
—	10	November 14	at Pittsburgh Steelers		1–1	Three Rivers Stadium	Cancelled due to 1982 NFL players strike
3	11	November 21	**Baltimore Colts**	**W** 37–0	2–1	Shea Stadium	46,970
4	12	November 28	Green Bay Packers	**W** 15–13	3–1	Shea Stadium	53,872
5	13	December 6	at Detroit Lions	**W** 28–13	4–1	Pontiac Silverdome	79,361
6	14	December 12	Tampa Bay Buccaneers	**W** 32–17	5–1	Shea Stadium	28,147
7	15	December 19	at **Miami Dolphins**	**L** 19–20	5–2	Miami Orange Bowl	67,702
8	16	December 26	at Minnesota Vikings	**W** 42–14	6–2	Hubert H. Humphrey Metrodome	58,672
9	17	January 2, 1983	at Kansas City Chiefs	**L** 13–37	6–3	Arrowhead Stadium	11,902
Note: Intra-division opponents are in **bold** text.

=== Season summary ===
==== Week 1: vs. Miami Dolphins ====
Week One: Miami Dolphins (0–0) at New York Jets (0–0)

Quarter	1	2	3	4	Total
**Dolphins**	14	10	21	0	**45**
Jets	7	7	0	14	**28**

at Shea Stadium • Flushing, New York

- Date: September 12
- Game time: 4:00 p.m. EDT
- Game weather: 75 °F (23.9 °C) • Wind 9 miles per hour (14 km/h; 7.8 kn)
- Game attendance: 53,360
- Referee: Dick Jorgensen
- TV: NBC
- Pro-Football-Reference.com

Game information

Dolphins

- David Woodley
  14/22, 98 Yds, INT
- Andra Franklin
  29 Rush, 103 Yds, 2 TD
- Jimmy Cefalo
  2 Rec, 25 Yds

Jets

- Richard Todd
  18/30, 233 Yds, 3 TD, 3 INT
- Freeman McNeil
  13 Rush, 116 Yds
- Jerome Barkum
  4 Rec, 71 Yds, TD

Scoring summary

Quarter	Time	Drive			Team	Scoring information	Score	
Quarter	Time	Plays	Yards	TOP	Team	Scoring information	MIA	NYJ
1					Dolphins	Andra Franklin 1-yard touchdown run, Uwe von Schamann kick good	7	0
1					Jets	Wesley Walker 29-yard touchdown reception from Richard Todd, Pat Leahy kick good	7	7
1					Dolphins	Punt returned 59 yards for touchdown by Tommy Vigorito, Uwe von Schamann kick good	14	7
2					Dolphins	Andra Franklin 1-yard touchdown run, Uwe von Schamann kick good	21	7
2					Dolphins	25-yard field goal by Uwe von Schamann	24	7
2					Jets	Mike Augustyniak 2-yard touchdown run, Pat Leahy kick good	24	14
3					Dolphins	David Woodley 15-yard touchdown reception from Tony Nathan, Uwe von Schamann kick good	31	14
3					Dolphins	Interception returned 35 yards for touchdown by Glenn Blackwood, Uwe von Schamann kick good	38	14
3					Dolphins	Interception returned 19 yards for touchdown by Don McNeal, Uwe von Schamann kick good	45	14
4					Jets	Jerome Barkum 7-yard touchdown reception from Richard Todd, Pat Leahy kick good	45	21
4					Jets	Wesley Walker 5-yard touchdown reception from Richard Todd, Pat Leahy kick good	45	28
"TOP" = time of possession. For other American football terms, see Glossary of American football.							45	28

==== Week 2: at New England Patriots ====
Week Two: New York Jets (0–1) at New England Patriots (1–0)

Quarter	1	2	3	4	Total
**Jets**	0	10	7	14	**31**
Patriots	0	0	7	0	**7**

at Schaefer Stadium

- Date: September 19, 1982
- Game weather: 62 °F (16.7 °C), relative humidity 60%, wind 14 miles per hour (23 km/h; 12 kn)
- Referee: Red Cashion
- TV announcers: Bob Costas and Bob Trumpy

Game information

Jets

- Richard Todd
  17/27, 165 Yds, TD
- Freeman McNeil
  19 Rush, 106 Yds, TD
- Wesley Walker
  6 Rec, 64 Yds, TD

Patriots

- Matt Cavanaugh
  6/17, 64 Yds, 3 INT
- Tony Collins
  13 Rush, 41 Yds
- Robert Weathers
  3 Rec, 24 Yds

Scoring summary

Quarter	Time	Drive			Team	Scoring information	Score	
Quarter	Time	Plays	Yards	TOP	Team	Scoring information	NYJ	NWE
2					Jets	17-yard field goal by Pat Leahy	3	0
2					Jets	Richard Todd 7-yard touchdown run, Pat Leahy kick good	10	0
3					Jets	Mike Augustyniak 6-yard touchdown run, Pat Leahy kick good	17	0
3					Patriots	Kickoff returned 98 yards for touchdown by Ricky Smith, Rex Robinson kick good	17	7
4					Jets	Freeman McNeil 1-yard touchdown run, Pat Leahy kick good	24	7
4					Jets	Scott Dierking 13-yard touchdown reception from Richard Todd, Pat Leahy kick good	31	7
"TOP" = time of possession. For other American football terms, see Glossary of American football.							31	7

==== Week 3: vs. Baltimore Colts ====
Week Three: Baltimore Colts (0–2) at New York Jets (1–1)

Quarter	1	2	3	4	Total
Colts	0	0	0	0	**0**
**Jets**	10	17	7	3	**37**

at Shea Stadium

- Date: November 21, 1982
- Game weather: 50 °F (10 °C), relative humidity 90%, wind 9 miles per hour (14 km/h; 7.8 kn)
- Referee: Fred Wyant
- TV announcers: Bob Costas and Bob Trumpy

Game information

Colts

- Mike Pagel
  17/34, 230 Yds, 2 INT
- Zachary Dixon
  10 Rush, 37 Yds
- Tim Sherwin
  5 Rec, 92 Yds

Jets

- Richard Todd
  17/27, 165 Yds, TD
- Freeman McNeil
  19 Rush, 106 Yds, TD
- Wesley Walker
  6 Rec, 64 Yds, TD

Scoring summary

Quarter	Time	Drive			Team	Scoring information	Score	
Quarter	Time	Plays	Yards	TOP	Team	Scoring information	BAL	NYJ
1					Jets	Freeman McNeil 34-yard touchdown run, Pat Leahy kick good	0	7
1					Jets	43-yard field goal by Pat Leahy	0	10
2					Jets	Mike Augustyniak 1-yard touchdown run, Pat Leahy kick good	0	17
2					Jets	Lam Jones 23-yard touchdown reception from Richard Todd, Pat Leahy kick good	0	24
2					Jets	37-yard field goal by Pat Leahy	0	27
3					Jets	Freeman McNeil 32-yard touchdown reception from Richard Todd, Pat Leahy kick good	0	34
4					Jets	19-yard field goal by Pat Leahy	0	37
"TOP" = time of possession. For other American football terms, see Glossary of American football.							0	37

==== Week 4: vs Green Bay Packers ====
Week Four: Green Bay Packers (2–1) at New York Jets (2–1)

Quarter	1	2	3	4	Total
Packers	6	7	0	0	**13**
**Jets**	6	0	9	0	**15**

at Shea Stadium

- Date: November 28, 1982
- Game time: 1:00 p.m.
- Game weather: 32 °F (0 °C), relative humidity 56%, wind 11 miles per hour (18 km/h; 9.6 kn), wind chill 24 °F (−4.4 °C)
- Game attendance: 53,872
- Referee: Gordon McCarter
- TV announcers: Jack Buck, Hank Stram

Game information

Packers

- Lyn Dickey
  19/30, 225 Yds, 2 TD
- Eddie Lee Ivery
  9 Rush, 29 Yds
- Phil Epps
  3 Rec, 64 Yds, 2 TD

Jets

- Richard Todd
  20/36, 240 Yds, TD, INT
- Freeman McNeil
  16 Rush, 85 Yds, TD
- Lam Jones
  4 Rec, 56 Yds, TD

Scoring summary

Quarter	Time	Drive			Team	Scoring information	Score	
Quarter	Time	Plays	Yards	TOP	Team	Scoring information	GNB	NYJ
1					Packers	Phil Epps 24-yard touchdown reception from Lynn Dickey, Jan Stenerud kick no good	6	0
1					Jets	Lam Jones 23-yard touchdown reception from Richard Todd, Pat Leahy kick no good	6	6
2					Packers	Phil Epps 23-yard touchdown reception from Lynn Dickey, Jan Stenerud kick good	13	6
3					Jets	Mike Augustyniak 4-yard touchdown run, Pat Leahy kick no good	13	12
3					Jets	25-yard field goal by Pat Leahy	13	15
"TOP" = time of possession. For other American football terms, see Glossary of American football.							13	15

==== Week 5: at Detroit Lions ====
Week Five: New York Jets (3–1) at Detroit Lions (2–2)

Quarter	1	2	3	4	Total
**Jets**	7	14	0	7	**28**
Lions	3	0	7	3	**13**

at Pontiac Silverdome

- Date: December 6, 1983
- Game weather: Indoors (dome)
- Referee: Chuck Heberling
- TV announcers: Frank Gifford, Howard Cosell, Don Meredith

Game information

Jets

- Richard Todd
  23/32, 384 Yds, 3 TD, INT
- Freeman McNeil
  16 Rush, 49 Yds
- Wesley Walker
  5 Rec, 164 Yds, 3 TD

Lions

- Gary Danielson
  14/37, 222 Yds, TD, 3 INT
- Billy Sims
  12 Rush, 43 Yds
- Billy Sims
  6 Rec, 85 Yds

Scoring summary

Quarter	Time	Drive			Team	Scoring information	Score	
Quarter	Time	Plays	Yards	TOP	Team	Scoring information	NYJ	DET
1					Lions	31-yard field goal by Eddie Murray	0	3
1					Jets	Dwayne Crutchfield 1-yard touchdown run, Pat Leahy kick good	7	3
2					Jets	Wesley Walker 56-yard touchdown reception from Richard Todd, Pat Leahy kick good	14	3
2					Jets	Wesley Walker 41-yard touchdown reception from Richard Todd, Pat Leahy kick good	21	3
3					Lions	Mark Nichols 48-yard touchdown reception from Gary Danielson, Eddie Murray kick good	21	10
4					Lions	22-yard field goal by Eddie Murray	21	13
4					Jets	Wesley Walker 19-yard touchdown reception from Richard Todd, Pat Leahy kick good	28	13
"TOP" = time of possession. For other American football terms, see Glossary of American football.							28	13

==== Week 6: vs. Tampa Bay Buccaneers ====
Week Six: Tampa Bay Buccaneers (2–3) at New York Jets (4–1)

Quarter	1	2	3	4	Total
Buccaneers	0	3	7	7	**17**
**Jets**	14	0	9	9	**32**

at Shea Stadium

- Date: December 12, 1982
- Game weather: 23 °F (−5 °C), cloudy
- Referee: Ben Dreith
- TV announcers: John Madden and Pat Summeral

Game information

Buccaneers

- Doug Williams
  18/38, 204 Yds, TD, 2 INT
- Doug Williams
  3 Rush, 19 Yds
- James Wilder Sr.
  11 Rec, 116 Yds, TD

Jets

- Richard Todd
  23/32, 384 Yds, TD, INT
- Freeman McNeil
  14 Rush, 53 Yds, 2 TD
- Wesley Walker
  4 Rec, 54 Yds

Scoring summary

Quarter	Time	Drive			Team	Scoring information	Score	
Quarter	Time	Plays	Yards	TOP	Team	Scoring information	TAM	NYJ
1					Jets	Freeman McNeil 4-yard touchdown run, Pat Leahy kick good	0	7
1					Jets	Freeman McNeil 5-yard touchdown run, Pat Leahy kick good	0	14
2					Buccaneers	32-yard field goal by Bill Capece	3	14
3					Jets	34-yard field goal by Pat Leahy	3	17
3					Buccaneers	James Wilder Sr. 1-yard touchdown run, Bill Capece kick good	10	17
3					Jets	Mickey Shuler 1-yard touchdown reception from Richard Todd, Pat Leahy kick no good	10	23
4					Jets	Scott Dierking 1-yard touchdown run, Pat Leahy kick no good	10	29
4					Jets	29-yard field goal by Pat Leahy	10	32
4					Buccaneers	James Wilder Sr. 15-yard touchdown reception from Doug Williams, Bill Capece kick good	17	32
"TOP" = time of possession. For other American football terms, see Glossary of American football.							17	32

==== Week 7: at Miami Dolphins ====
Week Seven: New York Jets (5–1) at Miami Dolphins (4–1)

Quarter	1	2	3	4	Total
Jets	6	10	0	3	**19**
**Dolphins**	10	7	0	3	**20**

at Orange Bowl, Miami, Florida

- Date: December 18, 1982
- Game time: 12:30 p.m. EDT
- Game weather: Sunny, 56 °F (13.3 °C)
- Game attendance: 67,702
- Referee: Bob McElwee
- TV: NBC
- Box Score

Team	Category	Player	Statistics
Jets	Passing	Richard Todd	16/29, 174 Yds, 2 TD, 2 INT
Jets	Rushing	Freeman McNeil	21 Rush, 89 Yds
Jets	Receiving	Wesley Walker	7 Rec, 96 Yds, TD
Dolphins	Passing	David Woodley	12/25, 148 Yds, TD, 2 INT
Dolphins	Rushing	Andra Franklin	17 Rush, 75 Yds, TD
Dolphins	Receiving	Duriel Harris	4 Rec, 74 Yds, TD

Scoring summary

Quarter	Time	Drive			Team	Scoring information	Score	
Quarter	Time	Plays	Yards	TOP	Team	Scoring information	NYJ	MIA
1					Jets	Wesley Walker 22-yard touchdown reception from Richard Todd, Pat Leahy kick no good (wide left)	6	0
1					Dolphins	47-yard field goal by Uwe von Schamann	6	3
1					Dolphins	Andra Franklin 25-yard touchdown run, Uwe von Schamann kick good	6	10
2					Jets	Derrick Gaffney 45-yard touchdown reception from Richard Todd, Pat Leahy kick good	13	10
2					Dolphins	Duriel Harris 36-yard touchdown reception from David Woodley, Uwe von Schamann kick good	13	17
2					Jets	40-yard field goal by Pat Leahy	16	17
4					Jets	49-yard field goal by Pat Leahy	19	17
4	0:03				Dolphins	47-yard field goal by Uwe von Schamann	19	20
"TOP" = time of possession. For other American football terms, see Glossary of American football.							19	20

==== Week 8: at Minnesota Vikings ====
Week Eight: New York Jets (5–2) at Minnesota Vikings (4–3)

Quarter	1	2	3	4	Total
**Jets**	7	14	7	14	**42**
Vikings	0	7	0	7	**14**

at Hubert H. Humphrey Metrodome

- Date: December 26, 1982
- Game weather: Indoors (dome)
- Referee: Gene Barth
- TV: NBC

Game information

Jets

- Richard Todd
  15/22, 236 Yds, TD
- Freeman McNeil
  18 Rush, 82 Yds, 2 TD
- Mickey Shuler
  3 Rec, 80 Yds, TD

Vikings

- Tommy Kramer
  32/56, 328 Yds, TD, 3 INT
- Ted Brown
  15 Rush, 57 Yds
- Joe Senser
  10 Rec, 115 Yds

Scoring summary

Quarter	Time	Drive			Team	Scoring information	Score	
Quarter	Time	Plays	Yards	TOP	Team	Scoring information	MIN	NYJ
1					Jets	Freeman McNeil 2-yard touchdown run, Pat Leahy kick good	7	0
2					Jets	Fumble recovery returned 80 yards for touchdown by Bobby Jackson, Pat Leahy kick good	14	0
2					Jets	Freeman McNeil 1-yard touchdown run, Pat Leahy kick good	21	0
2					Vikings	Tommy Kramer 1-yard touchdown run, Rick Danmeier kick good	21	7
3					Jets	Mickey Shuler 20-yard touchdown reception from Pat Ryan, Pat Leahy kick good	28	7
4					Vikings	Ted Brown 16-yard touchdown reception from Tommy Kramer, Rick Danmeier kick good	28	14
4					Jets	Bruce Harper 39-yard touchdown reception from Richard Todd, Pat Leahy kick good	35	14
4					Jets	Interception returned 77 yards for touchdown by Bobby Jackson, Pat Leahy kick good	42	14
"TOP" = time of possession. For other American football terms, see Glossary of American football.							42	14

==== Week 9: at Kansas City Chiefs ====
Week Nine: New York Jets (6–2) at Kansas City Chiefs (2–6)

Quarter	1	2	3	4	Total
Jets	6	0	0	7	**13**
**Chiefs**	7	20	0	10	**37**

at Arrowhead Stadium

- Date: January 2, 1983
- Game time: 1:00 p.m.
- Game weather: 28 °F (−2.2 °C), relative humidity 83%, wind 12 miles per hour (19 km/h; 10 kn), wind chill 18 °F (−7.8 °C)
- Referee: Pat Haggerty
- TV: NBC

Game information

Jets

- Richard Todd
  14/29, 109 Yds, INT
- Freeman McNeil
  12 Rush, 83 Yds
- Wesley Walker
  4 Rec, 56 Yds

Chiefs

- Bill Kenney
  18/27, 223 Yds, 3 TD, INT
- James Hadnot
  10 Rush, 58 Yds
- Carlos Carson
  4 Rec, 95 Yds, TD

Scoring summary

Quarter	Time	Drive			Team	Scoring information	Score	
Quarter	Time	Plays	Yards	TOP	Team	Scoring information	NYJ	KC
1					Jets	30-yard field goal by Pat Leahy	3	0
1					Jets	20-yard field goal by Pat Leahy	6	0
1					Chiefs	Carlos Carson 28-yard touchdown reception from Bill Kenney, Nick Lowery kick good	6	7
2					Chiefs	Henry Marshall 13-yard touchdown reception from Bill Kenney, Nick Lowery kick good	6	14
2					Chiefs	Interception returned 42 yards for touchdown by Gary Green, Nick Lowery kick good	6	21
2					Chiefs	44-yard field goal by Nick Lowery	6	24
2					Chiefs	43-yard field goal by Nick Lowery	6	27
3					Chiefs	Henry Marshall 5-yard touchdown reception from Bill Kenney, Nick Lowery kick good	6	34
3					Chiefs	44-yard field goal by Nick Lowery	6	37
3					Jets	Mickey Shuler 10-yard touchdown reception from Pat Ryan, Pat Leahy kick good	13	37
"TOP" = time of possession. For other American football terms, see Glossary of American football.							13	37

=== Postseason ===
Round	Date	Opponent (seed)	Result	Record	Venue	Recap
Wild Card	January 9	at Cincinnati Bengals (3)	**W** 44–17	1–0	Riverfront Stadium	57,560
Divisional	January 15	at Los Angeles Raiders (1)	**W** 17–14	2–0	Los Angeles Memorial Coliseum	90,038
AFC Championship	January 23	at Miami Dolphins (2)	**L** 0–14	2–1	Miami Orange Bowl	67,396

==== Wild card: at Cincinnati Bengals ====
Wild Card: New York Jets (6–3) at Cincinnati Bengals (7–2)

Quarter	1	2	3	4	Total
Jets	3	17	3	21	**44**
Bengals	14	0	3	0	**17**

at Riverfront Stadium

- Date: January 9, 1983
- Game time: 12:30 p.m.
- Game weather: 33 °F (0.6 °C), relative humidity 75%, wind 11 miles per hour (18 km/h; 9.6 kn), wind chill 24 °F (−4.4 °C)
- Referee: Chuck Heberling

Game information

Jets

- Richard Todd
  20/28, 269 Yds, TD, INT
- Freeman McNeil
  21 Rush, 202 Yds, TD
- Wesley Walker
  8 Rec, 145 Yds, TD

Bengals

- Ken Anderson
  26/35, 354 Yds, 2 TD, 3 INT
- Pete Johnson
  9 Rush, 26 Yds
- Cris Collinsworth
  7 Rec, 103 Yds

Scoring summary

Quarter	Time	Drive			Team	Scoring information	Score	
Quarter	Time	Plays	Yards	TOP	Team	Scoring information	NYJ	CIN
1					Bengals	Isaac Curtis 32-yard touchdown reception from Ken Anderson, Jim Breech kick good	0	7
1					Jets	33-yard field goal by Pat Leahy	3	7
1					Bengals	Dan Ross 2-yard touchdown reception from Ken Anderson, Jim Breech kick good	3	14
2					Jets	Derrick Gaffney 14-yard touchdown reception from Freeman McNeil, Pat Leahy kick good	10	14
2					Jets	Wesley Walker 4-yard touchdown reception from Richard Todd, Pat Leahy kick good	17	14
2					Jets	24-yard field goal by Pat Leahy	20	14
3					Jets	47-yard field goal by Pat Leahy	23	14
3					Bengals	20-yard field goal by Jim Breech	23	17
4					Jets	Freeman McNeil 20-yard touchdown run, Pat Leahy kick good	30	17
4					Jets	Interception returned 98 yards for touchdown by Darrol Ray, Pat Leahy kick good	37	17
4					Jets	Dwayne Crutchfield 1-yard touchdown run, Pat Leahy kick good	44	17
"TOP" = time of possession. For other American football terms, see Glossary of American football.							44	17

==== Divisional: at Los Angeles Raiders ====
Divsional: New York Jets (7–3) at Los Angeles Raiders (9–1)

Quarter	1	2	3	4	Total
**Jets**	7	3	0	7	**17**
Raiders	0	0	14	0	**14**

at Los Angeles Memorial Coliseum, Los Angeles

- Date: January 15, 1983
- Game time: 1:00 p.m., PST
- Game weather: 66 °F (18.9 °C); wind 6 miles per hour (9.7 km/h; 5.2 kn)
- Referee: Ben Dreith

Game information

Jets

- Richard Todd
  15/24, 277 Yds, TD, 2 INT
- Freeman McNeil
  23 Rush, 101 Yds
- Wesley Walker
  7 Rec, 169 Yds, TD

Raiders

- Jim Plunkett
  21/33, 266 Yds, TD, 3 INT
- Marcus Allen
  16 Rush, 36 Yds
- Malcom Barnwell
  2 Rec, 82 Yds, TD

Scoring summary

Quarter	Time	Drive			Team	Scoring information	Score	
Quarter	Time	Plays	Yards	TOP	Team	Scoring information	NYJ	LARd
1					Jets	Wesley Walker 20-yard touchdown reception from Richard Todd, Pat Leahy kick good	7	0
2					Jets	30-yard field goal by Pat Leahy	10	0
3					Raiders	Marcus Allen 3-yard touchdown run, Chris Bahr kick good	10	7
3					Raiders	Malcolm Barnwell 57-yard touchdown reception from Jim Plunkett, Chris Bahr kick good	10	14
4					Jets	Scott Dierking 1-yard touchdown run, Pat Leahy kick good	17	14
"TOP" = time of possession. For other American football terms, see Glossary of American football.							17	14

==== AFC Championship: at Miami Dolphins ====
AFC Championship: New York Jets (8–3) at Miami Dolphins (9–2)

Quarter	1	2	3	4	Total
Jets	0	0	0	0	**0**
**Dolphins**	0	0	7	7	**14**

at Miami Orange Bowl

- Date: January 23, 1983
- Game weather: 69 °F (20.6 °C), relative humidity 97%, wind 10 miles per hour (16 km/h; 8.7 kn)
- Referee: Pat Haggerty

Game information

Jets

- Richard Todd
  15/37, 103 Yds, 5 INT
- Freeman McNeil
  17 Rush, 46 Yds
- Lam Jones
  3 Rec, 35 Yds

Dolphins

- David Woodley
  9/21, 87 Yds, 3 INT
- David Woodley
  8 Rush, 46 Yds
- Tommy Vigorito
  3 Rec, 29 Yds

Scoring summary

Quarter	Time	Drive			Team	Scoring information	Score	
Quarter	Time	Plays	Yards	TOP	Team	Scoring information	NYJ	MIA
3					Dolphins	Woody Bennett 7-yard touchdown run, Uwe von Schamann kick good	0	7
4					Dolphins	Interception returned 35 yards for touchdown by A. J. Duhe, Uwe von Schamann kick good	0	14
"TOP" = time of possession. For other American football terms, see Glossary of American football.							0	14

The "Mud Bowl", in which the Jets were angered by the condition of the Orange Bowl’s grass field, which was not covered and was inundated with a huge amount of rainfall from a series of storms that swept through South Florida the week preceding the game (it was still overcast on the Sunday of the game but only had a minor drizzle). Don Shula responded by stating that he hadn't checked the weather reports because he was focused on getting the Dolphins ready for the game, and that both teams would face the same conditions in any case. A. J. Duhe intecepted three passes, returning the last for the game-sealing touchdown.

=== Standings ===
AFC East
	W	L	T	PCT	DIV	CONF	PF	PA	STK
^{(2)} Miami Dolphins	7	2	0	.778	6–1	6–1	198	131	W3
^{(6)} New York Jets	6	3	0	.667	2–2	2–3	245	166	L1
^{(7)} New England Patriots	5	4	0	.556	3–1	5–3	143	157	W1
Buffalo Bills	4	5	0	.444	1–3	3–3	150	154	L3
Baltimore Colts	0	8	1	.056	0–5	0–7	113	236	L2

AFC
#	Team	W	L	T	PCT	PF	PA	STK
**Seeded postseason qualifiers**
1	Los Angeles Raiders	8	1	0	.889	260	200	W5
2 (Note: Miami finished ahead of Cincinnati based on better conference record (6–1 to Cincinnati’s 6–2).)	Miami Dolphins	7	2	0	.778	198	131	W3
3	Cincinnati Bengals	7	2	0	.778	232	177	W2
4 (Note: Pittsburgh finished ahead of San Diego based on better record against common opponents (3–1 to Chargers' 2–1). Conference tiebreak was initially used to eliminate New York Jets.) (Note: Pittsburgh and San Diego finished ahead of New York Jets based on conference record (Pittsburgh and San Diego 5–3 against Jets’ 2–3))	Pittsburgh Steelers	6	3	0	.667	204	146	W2
5	San Diego Chargers	6	3	0	.667	288	221	L1
6	New York Jets	6	3	0	.667	245	166	L1
7	New England Patriots	5	4	0	.556	143	157	W1
8 (Note: Cleveland finished ahead of Buffalo and Buffalo ahead of Seattle based on conference record (4–3 to Buffalo’s 3–3 to Seattle’s 3–5).)	Cleveland Browns	4	5	0	.444	140	182	L1
**Did not qualify for the postseason**
9	Buffalo Bills	4	5	0	.444	150	154	L3
10	Seattle Seahawks	4	5	0	.444	127	147	W1
11	Kansas City Chiefs	3	6	0	.333	176	184	W1
12	Denver Broncos	2	7	0	.222	148	226	L3
13	Houston Oilers	1	8	0	.111	136	245	L7
14	Baltimore Colts	0	8	1	.056	113	236	L2
**Tiebreakers**

== Awards and honors ==
- Freeman McNeil, NFL rushing leader
