= 1981 New York Jets season =

1981 season of NFL team New York Jets

- Owner: Leon Hess
- Head coach: Walt Michaels
- Offensive coordinator: Joe Walton
- Defensive coordinator: Joe Gardi
- Home stadium: Shea Stadium

Results
- Record: 10–5–1
- Division place: 2nd AFC East
- Playoffs: Lost Wild Card Playoffs (vs. Bills) 27–31
- Pro Bowlers: C Joe Fields; T Marvin Powell; DE Joe Klecko; DE Mark Gastineau

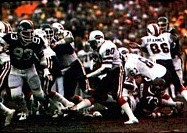
The Jets playing the Bills in the 1981 AFC wild card game.

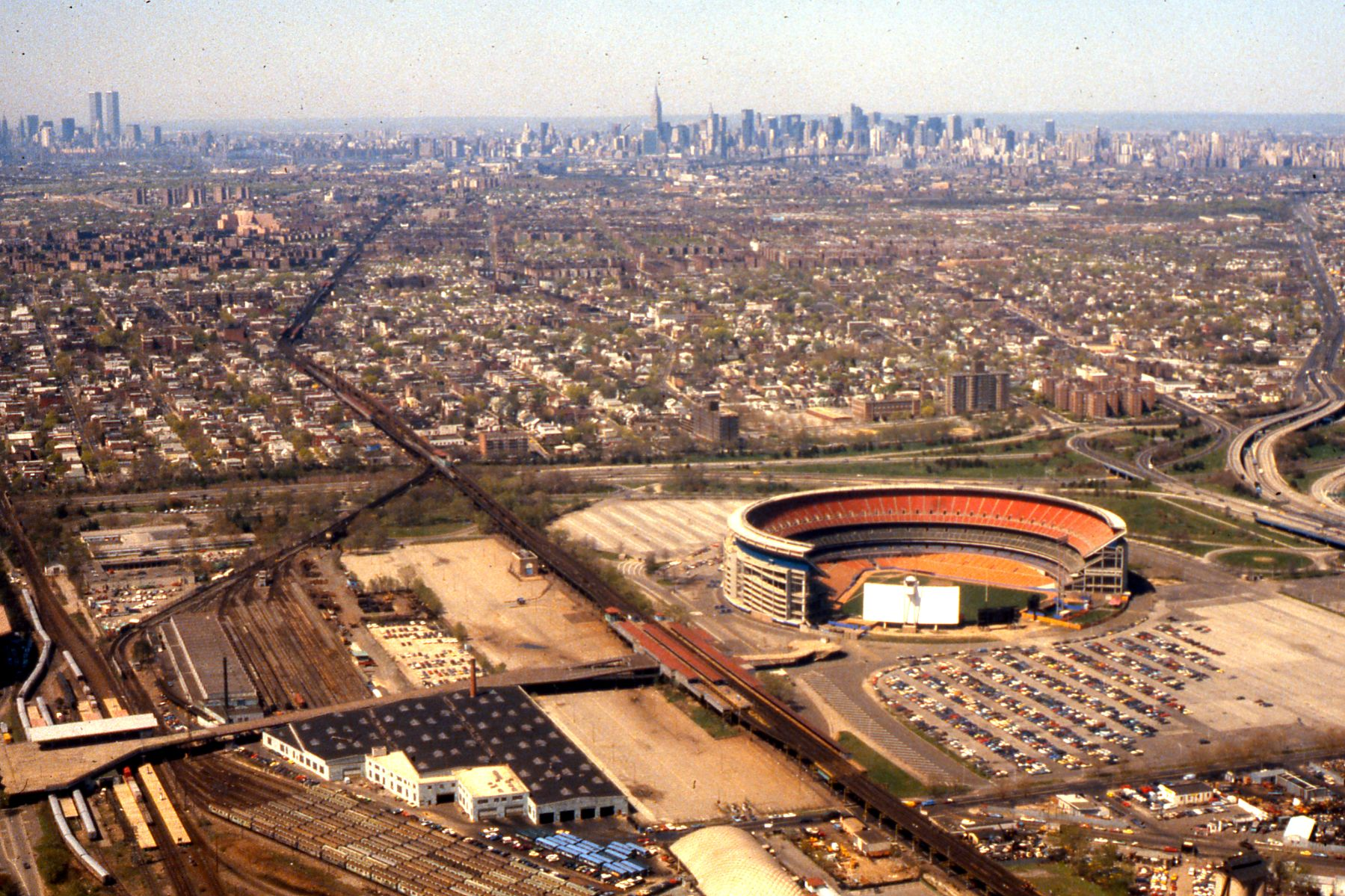
Shea Stadium in 1981

The 1981 New York Jets season was the 22nd season for the franchise and its twelfth in the National Football League (NFL). It began with the team trying to improve upon its 4–12 record from 1980 under head coach Walt Michaels. The Jets sputtered early, starting 0–3 and (combined with the previous season's 4–12 finish) fueling a quarterback controversy and altercation between quarterback Richard Todd and sports writer Steve Serby and speculation about Michaels’ job. After the 0–3 start, however, the Jets would catch fire, and go on a 10–2–1 run. The team ultimately finished the season with a record of 10–5–1 and qualified for the playoffs for the first time since 1969, breaking a twelve-season drought. In the playoffs, however, they fell to their division rivals, the Buffalo Bills, 31–27.

== Offseason ==
=== Draft ===
1981 New York Jets draft
Round	Pick	Player	Position	College	Notes
1	2	Freeman McNeil *	RB	UCLA	
2	30	Marion Barber Jr.	RB	Minnesota	made roster beginning in 1982
3	60	Ben Rudolph	DT	Long Beach State	
4	86	Al Washington	LB	Ohio State	
5	113	Tyrone Keys	DE	Mississippi State	
6	142	John Woodring	LB	Brown	
7	169	Kenny Neil	DE	Iowa State	
8	195	Lloyd Jones	WR	BYU	
8	213	J. C. Watts	DB	Oklahoma	
9	225	Admiral Dewey Larry	DB	UNLV	
10	251	Marty Wetzel	LB	Tulane	
11	278	Ed Gall	DT	Maryland	
12	308	Mike Moeller	T	Drake	
Made roster † Pro Football Hall of Fame * Made at least one Pro Bowl during career

=== Undrafted free agents ===
1981 undrafted free agents of note
Player	Position	College
Todd Benson	Linebacker	Maryland
Ted Blackwell	Running back	Rutgers
Kent Clausen	Linebacker	Montana
Gary England	Guard	Nebraska
Scott Fanz	Guard	Maryland
John Nitti	Running back	Yale
Joe Pellegrini	Guard	Harvard
John Wojtowicz	Guard	Penn State

== Personnel ==
=== Staff ===
1981 New York Jets staff
Front office: Leon Hess – Owner; Jim Kensil – President/CEO; Mike Hickey – Director of player personnel; Jim Royer – Director of pro personnel; Carroll Huntress – Scout; Connie Carberg – Personnel assistant; Head coaches: Walt Michaels – Head coach; Offensive coaches: Joe Walton – Offensive coordinator; Bob Ledbetter – Running backs; Bob Fry – Offensive line; Pete McCulley – Receivers	Defensive coaches: Joe Gardi – Defensive coordinator

=== Roster ===
1981 New York Jets roster
Quarterbacks (QB): 10 Pat Ryan; 14 Richard Todd; Running backs (RB): 25 Scott Dierking; 42 Bruce Harper; 33 Kevin Long; 24 Freeman McNeil; 44 Tom Newton; Wide receivers (WR): 81 Derrick Gaffney; 89 Bobby Jones; 80 Lam Jones; 87 Kurt Sohn; 85 Wesley Walker; Tight ends (TE): 83 Jerome Barkum; 82 Mickey Shuler; 86 Steve Stephens	Offensive linemen (OL): 60 Dan Alexander G; 64 Guy Bingham C/G; 65 Joe Fields C; 79 Marvin Powell T; 66 Randy Rasmussen G; 61 John Roman T; 70 Stan Waldemore G/C; 72 Chris Ward T; Defensive linemen (DL): 99 Mark Gastineau DE; 73 Joe Klecko DE; 93 Marty Lyons DT; 77 Kenny Neil DE; 76 Ben Rudolph DT; 74 Abdul Salaam DT	Linebackers (LB): 54 Stan Blinka MLB; 51 Greg Buttle OLB; 55 Ron Crosby OLB; 56 Lance Mehl OLB; 52 Al Washington OLB; 58 Marty Wetzel OLB; 57 John Woodring MLB; Defensive backs (DB): 26 Donald Dykes CB; 47 Jerry Holmes CB; 27 Jesse Johnson CB/S; 29 Johnny Lynn CB/S; 28 Darrol Ray FS; 48 Ken Schroy SS; 45 Kirk Springs CB/S; Special teams (ST): 5 Pat Leahy K; 15 Chuck Ramsey P	Reserve: 35 Mike Augustyniak RB (IR); 31 Marion Barber RB (IR); 59 Kent Clausen LB (IR); 40 Bobby Jackson CB (IR); 20 Kenny Lewis RB (IR); 53 Mike McKibben LB (IR); 34 John Nitti RB (IR); 62 Joe Pellegrini C (IR); Rookies in italics

== Regular season ==
=== Schedule ===
Week	Date	Opponent	Result	Record	Venue	Attendance
1	September 6	at **Buffalo Bills**	**L** 0–31	0–1	Rich Stadium	79,754
2	September 13	Cincinnati Bengals	**L** 30–31	0–2	Shea Stadium	49,454
3	September 20	at Pittsburgh Steelers	**L** 10–38	0–3	Three Rivers Stadium	52,973
4	September 27	Houston Oilers	**W** 33–17	1–3	Shea Stadium	50,309
5	October 4	at **Miami Dolphins**	**T** 28–28	1–3–1	Miami Orange Bowl	68,723
6	October 11	**New England Patriots**	**W** 28–24	2–3–1	Shea Stadium	55,093
7	October 18	**Buffalo Bills**	**W** 33–14	3–3–1	Shea Stadium	54,607
8	October 25	Seattle Seahawks	**L** 3–19	3–4–1	Shea Stadium	49,678
9	November 1	at New York Giants	**W** 26–7	4–4–1	Giants Stadium	74,740
10	November 8	at **Baltimore Colts**	**W** 41–14	5–4–1	Memorial Stadium	31,521
11	November 15	at **New England Patriots**	**W** 17–6	6–4–1	Schaefer Stadium	45,342
12	November 22	**Miami Dolphins**	**W** 16–15	7–4–1	Shea Stadium	59,962
13	November 29	**Baltimore Colts**	**W** 25–0	8–4–1	Shea Stadium	53,593
14	December 6	at Seattle Seahawks	**L** 23–27	8–5–1	Kingdome	53,105
15	December 12	at Cleveland Browns	**W** 14–13	9–5–1	Cleveland Municipal Stadium	56,866
16	December 20	Green Bay Packers	**W** 28–3	10–5–1	Shea Stadium	56,340
Note: Intra-division opponents are in **bold** text.

=== Season summary ===
==== Week 15 at Browns ====
Week Fifteen: New York Jets (8–5–1) at Cleveland Browns (5–9)

Quarter	1	2	3	4	Total
Jets	0	14	0	0	**14**
Browns	0	3	7	3	**13**

at Municipal Stadium • Cleveland, Ohio

- Date: December 12
- Game time: 12:30 p.m. EDT
- Game weather: 32 °F (0 °C) • Wind 6 miles per hour (9.7 km/h; 5.2 kn)
- Game attendance: 56,866
- Referee: Jerry Seeman
- TV announcers (NBC): Dick Enberg
- Pro-Football-Reference.com

Game information

Jets

- Richard Todd
  15/28, 159 Yds, 2 TD, 2 INT
- Scott Dierking
  13 Rush, 76 Yds
- Johnny Lam Jones
  5 Rec, 83 Yds, TD

Browns

- Brian Sipe
  20/35, 280 Yds, TD
- Mike Pruitt
  15 Rush, 41 Yds
- Ozzie Newsome
  5 Rec, 79 Yds

Scoring summary

Quarter	Time	Drive			Team	Scoring information	Score	
Quarter	Time	Plays	Yards	TOP	Team	Scoring information	NYJ	CLE
2					Jets	Johnny Lam Jones 28-yard touchdown reception from Richard Todd, Pat Leahy kick good	7	0
2					Browns	26-yard field goal by Matt Bahr	7	3
2					Jets	Bruce Harper 7-yard touchdown reception from Richard Todd, Pat Leahy kick good	14	3
3					Browns	Calvin Hill 8-yard touchdown reception from Brian Sipe, Matt Bahr kick good	14	10
4					Browns	20-yard field goal by Matt Bahr	14	13
"TOP" = time of possession. For other American football terms, see Glossary of American football.							14	13

=== Playoffs ===
Round	Date	Opponent (seed)	Result	Record	Venue	Attendance
Wildcard	December 27	Buffalo Bills (5)	**L** 27–31	0–1	Shea Stadium	57,050

==== AFC: Buffalo Bills 31, New York Jets 27 ====
Buffalo Bills vs. New York Jets – Game summary

Quarter	1	2	3	4	Total
**Bills**	17	7	0	7	**31**
Jets	0	10	3	14	**27**

at Shea Stadium, Flushing, Queens, New York

- Game time: 12:00 p.m. EST
- Game weather: 35 °F (2 °C), drizzle
- Game attendance: 57,050
- Referee: Bob McElwee
- TV announcers (NBC): Charlie Jones (play-by-play) and Len Dawson (color commentator)

Game information
- **Scoring**
  - BUF – Romes 26 fumble return (Mike-Mayer kick) BUF 7–0
  - BUF – Lewis 50 pass from Ferguson (Mike-Mayer kick) BUF 14–0
  - BUF – field goal Mike-Mayer 29 BUF 17–0
  - BUF – Lewis 26 pass from Ferguson (Mike-Mayer kick) BUF 24–0
  - NYJ – Shuler 30 pass from Todd (Leahy kick) BUF 24–7
  - NYJ – field goal Leahy 26 BUF 24–10
  - NYJ – field goal Leahy 19 BUF 24–13
  - BUF – Cribbs 45 run (Mike-Mayer kick) BUF 31–13
  - NYJ – Jones 30 pass from Todd (Leahy kick) BUF 31–20
  - NYJ – Long 1 run (Leahy kick) BUF 31–27

=== Standings ===
AFC East
	W	L	T	PCT	DIV	CONF	PF	PA	STK
^{(2)} Miami Dolphins	11	4	1	.719	5–2–1	8–3–1	345	275	W4
^{(4)} New York Jets	10	5	1	.656	6–1–1	8–5–1	355	287	W2
^{(5)} Buffalo Bills	10	6	0	.625	6–2	9–3	311	276	L1
Baltimore Colts	2	14	0	.125	2–6	2–10	259	533	W1
New England Patriots	2	14	0	.125	0–8	2–10	322	370	L9
