= 1984 New York Jets season =

1984 season of NFL team New York Jets

- Owner: Leon Hess
- Head coach: Joe Walton
- Home stadium: Giants Stadium

Results
- Record: 7–9
- Division place: 3rd AFC East
- Playoffs: Did not qualify
- Pro Bowlers: RB Freeman McNeil; DE Mark Gastineau; DT Joe Klecko

The 1984 New York Jets season was the 25th season for the team and the fifteenth in the National Football League. It began with the team trying to improve upon its 7–9 record from 1983 under head coach Joe Walton. After playing the previous 20 seasons at Shea Stadium in Queens, 1984 marked their first season of playing its home games at Giants Stadium in The Meadowlands, which was also the home of the NFC’s New York Giants. Mark Gastineau made NFL history by recording 22 sacks, to establish a then-new official single season record. The Jets finished the season with a record of 7–9.

== Offseason ==
=== Draft ===
1984 New York Jets draft
| Round | Pick | Player | Position | College | Notes |
| 1 | 10 | Russell Carter | Cornerback | SMU | |
Made roster † Pro Football Hall of Fame * Made at least one Pro Bowl during career

== Roster ==
1984 New York Jets roster
| Quarterbacks (QB): 17 Bob Avellini; 7 Ken O'Brien; 10 Pat Ryan; Running backs (RB): 31 Marion Barber; 23 Dennis Bligen; 34 Johnny Hector; 25 Cedric Minter; 49 Tony Paige; Wide receivers (WR): 83 Nick Bruckner; 88 Chy Davidson; 84 Bobby Humphery; 80 Lam Jones; 87 Kurt Sohn; 85 Wesley Walker; Tight ends (TE): 84 Glenn Dennison; 89 Rocky Klever; 82 Mickey Shuler | Offensive linemen (OL): 60 Dan Alexander G; 63 Ted Banker T; 64 Guy Bingham C; 65 Joe Fields C; 68 Reggie McElroy T; 79 Marvin Powell T; 53 Jim Sweeney G; 70 Stan Waldemore G; Defensive linemen (DL): 95 Tom Baldwin DT; 78 Barry Bennett DT; 74 Ron Faurot DE; 99 Mark Gastineau DE; 73 Joe Klecko DT/DE; 93 Marty Lyons DE; 76 Ben Rudolph DE/DT | Linebackers (LB): 58 Bobby Bell OLB; 51 Greg Buttle OLB; 59 Kyle Clifton MLB; 52 Jim Eliopulos OLB; 94 Rusty Guilbeau OLB; 56 Lance Mehl OLB; 57 John Woodring MLB; Defensive backs (DB): 46 Fernanza Burgess SS; 27 Russell Carter CB; 22 Mike Dennis CB; 38 George Floyd CB/S; 29 Johnny Lynn CB; 20 Davlin Mullen CB; 28 Darrol Ray FS; 21 Kirk Springs SS; Special teams (ST): 5 Pat Leahy K; 15 Chuck Ramsey P | Reserve: -- Tron Armstrong WR (IR); 35 Mike Augustyniak RB (IR); -- Ronny Cone RB (IR); 50 Bob Crable LB (IR); 81 Derrick Gaffney WR (IR); -- Billy Griggs TE (IR); 39 Harry Hamilton S (IR); 42 Bruce Harper RB (IR); 40 Bobby Jackson CB (IR); 24 Freeman McNeil RB (IR); 48 Ken Schroy S (IR); Rookies in italics |

== Regular season ==
=== Schedule ===
| Week | Date | Opponent | Result | Record | Venue | Attendance |
|---|---|---|---|---|---|---|
| 1 | September 2 | at **Indianapolis Colts** | **W** 23–14 | 1–0 | Hoosier Dome | 61,148 |
| 2 | September 6 | Pittsburgh Steelers | **L** 17–23 | 1–1 | Giants Stadium | 70,564 |
| 3 | September 16 | Cincinnati Bengals | **W** 43–23 | 2–1 | Giants Stadium | 64,193 |
| 4 | September 23 | at **Buffalo Bills** | **W** 28–26 | 3–1 | Rich Stadium | 48,330 |
| 5 | September 30 | **New England Patriots** | **L** 21–28 | 3–2 | Giants Stadium | 68,978 |
| 6 | October 7 | at Kansas City Chiefs | **W** 17–16 | 4–2 | Arrowhead Stadium | 51,843 |
| 7 | October 14 | at Cleveland Browns | **W** 24–20 | 5–2 | Cleveland Municipal Stadium | 55,673 |
| 8 | October 21 | Kansas City Chiefs | **W** 28–7 | 6–2 | Giants Stadium | 66,782 |
| 9 | October 28 | at **New England Patriots** | **L** 20–30 | 6–3 | Sullivan Stadium | 60,513 |
| 10 | November 4 | Miami Dolphins | **L** 17–31 | 6–4 | Giants Stadium | 72,655 |
| 11 | November 11 | **Indianapolis Colts** | **L** 5–9 | 6–5 | Giants Stadium | 51,066 |
| 12 | November 18 | at Houston Oilers | **L** 20–31 | 6–6 | Astrodome | 40,141 |
| 13 | November 26 | at **Miami Dolphins** | **L** 17–28 | 6–7 | Miami Orange Bowl | 74,884 |
| 14 | December 2 | New York Giants | **L** 10–20 | 6–8 | Giants Stadium | 74,975 |
| 15 | December 8 | **Buffalo Bills** | **W** 21–17 | 7–8 | Giants Stadium | 45,378 |
| 16 | December 16 | at Tampa Bay Buccaneers | **L** 21–41 | 7–9 | Tampa Stadium | 43,817 |
Note: Intra-division opponents are in **bold** text.

=== Game summaries ===
==== Week 1 ====
| Team | 1 | 2 | 3 | 4 | Total |
|---|---|---|---|---|---|
| • Jets | 0 | 7 | 9 | 7 | 23 |
| Colts | 0 | 7 | 0 | 7 | 14 |

- Date: September 2
- Location: Hoosier Dome, Indianapolis, Indiana
- Game start: 4:00 p.m.
- Game weather: Indoors (dome)
- Referee: Gordon McCarter

Scoring summary
| Q2 | IND | Dickey 3 yard run (Allegre kick) | IND 7–0 |
| Q2 | NYJ | Shuler 13 yard pass from Ryan (Leahy kick) | Tie 7–7 |
| Q3 | NYJ | Leahy 29 yard field goal | NYJ 10–7 |
| Q3 | NYJ | Shuler 8 yard pass from Ryan (kick failed) | NYJ 16–7 |
| Q4 | IND | Middleton 3 yard run (Allegre kick) | NYJ 16–14 |
| Q4 | NYJ | Buttle 4 yard fumble return (Leahy kick) | NYJ 23–14 |

==== Week 3 ====
| Team | 1 | 2 | 3 | 4 | Total |
|---|---|---|---|---|---|
| Bengals | 9 | 0 | 7 | 7 | 23 |
| • Jets | 6 | 7 | 10 | 20 | 43 |

- Date: September 16
- Location: Giants Stadium, East Rutherford, New Jersey
- Game start: 1:00 p.m.
- Game weather: 56 °F (13.3 °C); wind 13 miles per hour (21 km/h; 11 kn)
- Referee: Red Cashion

Scoring summary
| Q1 | NYJ | Leahy 22 yard field goal | NYJ 3–0 |
| Q1 | CIN | Breech 21 yard field goal | Tie 3–3 |
| Q1 | NYJ | Leahy 39 yard field goal | NYJ 6–3 |
| Q1 | CIN | Brooks 3 yard pass from Anderson (pass failed) | CIN 9–6 |
| Q2 | NYJ | McNeil 15 yard run (Leahy kick) | NYJ 13–9 |
| Q3 | CIN | Harris 80 yard pass from Anderson (Breech kick) | CIN 16–13 |
| Q3 | NYJ | Leahy 32 yard field goal | Tie 16–16 |
| Q3 | NYJ | Shuler 9 yard pass from Ryan (Leahy kick) | NYJ 23–16 |
| Q4 | NYJ | Leahy 36 yard field goal | NYJ 26–16 |
| Q4 | NYJ | McNeil 33 yard run (Leahy kick) | NYJ 33–16 |
| Q4 | NYJ | Leahy 29 yard field goal | NYJ 36–16 |
| Q4 | NYJ | Harper 9 yard run (Leahy kick) | NYJ 43–16 |
| Q4 | CIN | Esiason 1 yard run (Breech kick) | NYJ 43–23 |

==== Week 9 ====
New York Jets at New England Patriots

| Team | 1 | 2 | 3 | 4 | Total |
|---|---|---|---|---|---|
| Jets | 10 | 10 | 0 | 0 | 20 |
| • **Patriots** | 0 | 6 | 10 | 14 | 30 |

- Date: October 28
- Location: Sullivan Stadium, Foxboro, Massachusetts
- Game start: 1:00 p.m. EST
- Game weather: 59 °F (15 °C), wind 13 mph (21 km/h)
- Referee: Chuck Heberling
- Source: Pro-Football-Reference.com

Scoring summary
| 1 | Jets | Pat Leahy 46-yard field goal | Jets 3–0 |
| 1 | Jets | Rocky Klever 7-yard pass from Ken O'Brien (Pat Leahy kick) | Jets 10–0 |
| 2 | Patriots | Tony Franklin 20-yard field goal | Jets 10–3 |
| 2 | Jets | Pat Leahy 18-yard field goal | Jets 13–3 |
| 2 | Jets | Marion Barber 2-yard run (Pat Leahy kick) | Jets 20–3 |
| 2 | Patriots | Tony Franklin 27-yard field goal | Jets 20–6 |
| 3 | Patriots | Tony Franklin 47-yard field goal | Jets 20–9 |
| 3 | Patriots | Craig James 25-yard run (Tony Franklin kick) | Jets 20–16 |
| 4 | Patriots | Stephen Starring 5-yard pass from Tony Eason (Tony Franklin kick) | Patriots 23–20 |
| 4 | Patriots | Tony Collins 4-yard run (Tony Franklin kick) | Patriots 30–20 |

Raymond Berry's first game as Patriots' head coach.

=== Standings ===
AFC East
| | W | L | T | PCT | DIV | CONF | PF | PA | STK |
|---|---|---|---|---|---|---|---|---|---|
| ^{(1)} Miami Dolphins | 14 | 2 | 0 | .875 | 8–0 | 10–2 | 513 | 298 | W2 |
| New England Patriots | 9 | 7 | 0 | .563 | 6–2 | 9–3 | 362 | 352 | W1 |
| New York Jets | 7 | 9 | 0 | .438 | 3–5 | 7–7 | 332 | 364 | L1 |
| Indianapolis Colts | 4 | 12 | 0 | .250 | 2–6 | 4–8 | 239 | 414 | L5 |
| Buffalo Bills | 2 | 14 | 0 | .125 | 1–7 | 1–11 | 250 | 454 | L2 |
