= George Floyd (American football) =

American football player (born 1960)

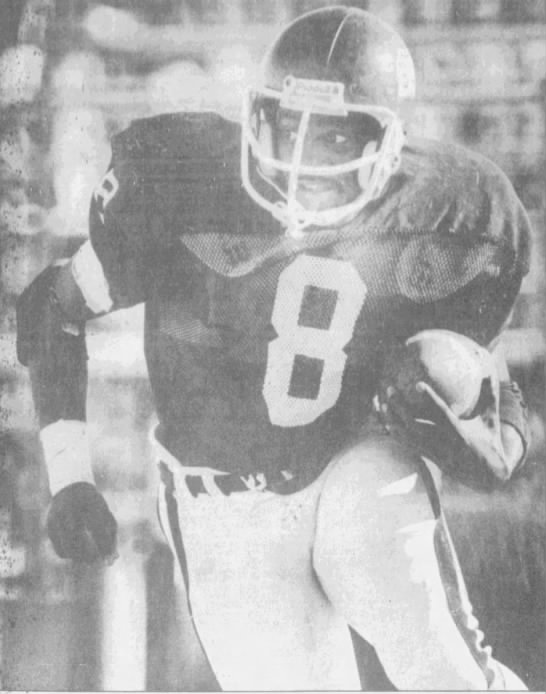
- Floyd in 1980

No. 38
- Position: Defensive back

Personal information
- Born: December 21, 1960 (age 65); Tampa, Florida, U.S.
- Listed height: 5 ft 11 in (1.80 m)
- Listed weight: 190 lb (86 kg)

Career information
- High school: Hernando (Brooksville, Florida)
- College: Eastern Kentucky
- NFL draft: 1982: 4th round, 107th overall pick

Career history
- New York Jets (1982–1984)

Awards and highlights
- FCS national champion (1979); 2× First-team All-OVC (1980, 1981)
- Stats at Pro Football Reference
- College Football Hall of Fame

George Floyd Jr. (born December 21, 1960) is an American former professional football player who was a defensive back for two seasons with the New York Jets in the National Football League. Growing up in Brooksville, Florida, Floyd attended Hernando High School, where he was selected for The Tampa Tribune's all-area football team in all three of his varsity years. Floyd played college football for the Eastern Kentucky University (EKU) Colonels, and won the 1979 National Collegiate Athletic Association (NCAA) Division I-AA football championship.

Over his collegiate career, Floyd won numerous awards, including Ohio Valley Conference (OVC) Athlete of the Year after the 1981 regular season, an award given to the best male overall athlete in the conference regardless of sport. Kodak and Associated Press named Floyd to their All-America teams in 1980 and 1981, honors given annually to the best college football players in the United States at their respective positions.

Selected by the New York Jets in the 1982 NFL draft, Floyd appeared in ten games during the team's 1982 season, including three playoff games. After missing the 1983 season because of a knee injury, he appeared in eight games during the 1984 season before retiring because of another knee injury during the 1985 NFL preseason, where teams played exhibition games before their regular seasons began.

Floyd is the joint holder of five records at EKU as of 2023. He was inducted into the College Football Hall of Fame and the halls of fame of EKU and Hernando High School. In 2009, EKU named Floyd to their All-Century team, composed of the best football players in the EKU history for its first hundred years.

== Early life ==
George Floyd Jr. was born on December 21, 1960, in Tampa, and grew up in Brooksville, both in Florida. He attended the Hernando High School and played football and basketball for the Hernando high school team, nicknamed the Leopards. In Floyd's sophomore season, Hernando finished as Gulf Coast Conference (GSS) football champions. After Floyd's sophomore, junior, and senior years, The Tampa Tribune (the Tribune) named him to their all-area football team. With the accomplishment, Floyd became the first player of any high school named to the Tribune's team during all three varsity seasons. He was selected for the GSS All-Star team, an honorific team composed of the best football players in the conference, after his sophomore and junior years.

Floyd finished his senior season in 1977 with nine total interceptions, which established a school record that stood for four years. The Florida Sports Writers Association named Floyd to their second-team Class 3A (Note: Class 3A being a school classification) all-state squad in January 1978. He served as captain of the Leopards' defensive unit each year he played for Hernando. In 2011, Floyd was inducted into Hernando High School's Hall of Fame. He wanted to play college football for the University of Georgia as a high school senior, but instead attended Eastern Kentucky University (EKU) of the Ohio Valley Conference (OVC).

== Collegiate career ==
Floyd's first start with the EKU Colonels came as a freshman against the Murray State Racers at roverback, where he led the defense with twelve tackles. He finished the season with twenty-six tackles, eighth most on the team, with four tackles for loss (TFLs) and one fumble recovery as the Colonels finished with an 8–2 record. The team's eight wins tied a school record for most wins in a season.

In Floyd's sophomore year, he had a three-interception game against Austin Peay in a 35–10 EKU victory in September. Against Jackson State in November, he had sixteen tackles, one interception and one fumble recovery. The Colonels finished with an 11–2 record and defeated the Lehigh Engineers 30–7 to win the 1979 NCAA Division I-AA football championship, (Note: NCAA Division I-AA was renamed to the NCAA Division I Football Championship Subdivision before the 2006 season.) the first in EKU's history. After the season, head football coaches in the conference named him to the second-team All-OVC, composed of the second-best players at every position in the conference. Floyd led the OVC with thirteen punt returns and seven interceptions. He started every game, his sixty-eight tackles were fourth-most on the Colonels and he led the team with four fumble recoveries.

Before the 1980 season, OVC football head coaches voted Floyd to the preseason All-OVC Team. In a game against Youngstown State Floyd returned an interception one hundred yards, tying a conference record, and scored a touchdown. He won OVC Defensive Player of the Year, made the OVC All-Conference first-team, and was named a Kodak and an Associated Press All-American (an honor given annually to the best college football players in the United States at their respective positions) as the Colonels finished with a 10–3 record and lost to the Boise State Broncos in the championship game 31–29. He finished the regular season tied for most interceptions in the OVC, with five, and finished with sixty-three tackles, seven TFLs and one fumble recovery. On special teams, Floyd returned 17 punts for 142 yards.

Before the 1981 season, an EKU media guide described Floyd as "one of the most consistent players EKU has ever had in the secondary" and as a "very intense player". He was co-captain of the team his senior year. In a game against Murray State, Floyd intercepted a pass from quarterback Gino Gibbs on the EKU two-yard line with sixteen seconds left in the game. EKU won 24–20. After the regular season, Floyd won OVC Defensive Player of the Year, was voted to the First-team All-OVC, was selected as a Kodak and an Associated Press All-American, and won OVC Athlete of the Year (given to the best male overall athlete in the OVC, regardless of sport). In the postseason, Floyd had a two-interception game against Boise State in a 23–17 EKU victory, though the Colonels lost in the championship game to the Idaho State Bengals 34–23 and finished with a 12–2 record. (Note: An article in The Courier-Journal credits Floyd with only one interception in the game against Boise State.) He finished the year with seventy-two tackles and ten interceptions; on special teams, he returned thirty-six punts for 314 yards and a touchdown.

At the end of his tenure with EKU, Floyd was in the school's record book eight times, and, as of 2023, he holds or ties five school records: for longest interception return (100 yards), most punt returns in a single season (36), most interceptions in a single season (10), most career interceptions (22), and most career interception return yards (328). In 1999, Floyd was inducted into the College Football Hall of Fame, and, in 2007, EKU inducted him into their Hall of Fame. Floyd was elected to EKU's All-Century team, composed of the best football players in EKU history for its first hundred years, in 2009.

== Professional career ==
The New York Jets selected Floyd in the fourth round of the 1982 NFL draft with the 107th overall selection. Floyd signed a contract with the Jets in June 1982. In Jets training camp, Floyd was the third-string free safety, behind starter Darrol Ray and Jesse Johnson, and competed for a spot as a kick returner with Kurt Sohn, Lonell Phea, and Kolas Elion. Floyd appeared at both safety spots (free safety and strong safety). Bill Verigan of the New York Daily News projected "only a very few, perhaps three or four" of the Jets new players to make the team. Floyd made the team after final cuts.

During the 1982 NFL strike, Floyd worked out at EKU; when he returned to New York, he worked in construction, installing windows in skyscrapers. Floyd appeared in ten games for the 1982 New York Jets, including three playoff games, as the Jets finished the shortened regular season (Note: As a result of the strike, the season schedule was reduced from 16 games to 9 and the playoffs expanded the then-standard 10 to 16 teams (eight from each conference) for this one season only.) with a 6–3 record and lost in the AFC Championship Game to the Miami Dolphins 14–0. According to Pete Reinwald of the Tribune, Floyd saw limited action over the season on special teams and as a backup safety.

Prior to the 1983 season, Floyd tried out for punt returner along with Kirk Springs and Davlin Mullen. During the preseason, Floyd moved from safety to cornerback, and averaged 15.2 yards per return as a punt returner and 30.2 yards per return as a kickoff returner, with one interception. In a preseason game against the New Orleans Saints, Floyd suffered a sprained knee on a kickoff return he fumbled. The Jets placed Floyd on their injured reserve list (IRL), and Floyd missed the entire 1983 season.

Floyd was placed on the IRL again before the 1984 season with a hyperextended knee that bothered him intermittently throughout the preseason. He was activated from the IRL in late October and became a starter in early November for injured right cornerback Russell Carter. Paul Needell of the New York Daily News described Floyd as the fifth-best corner on the Jets by the time he was a starter, and Rowe described Floyd and Mullen as the Achilles' heel of the Jets defense on November 19.

Over the course of the 1984 season, Floyd started two games for the Jets and appeared in eight as the team finished with a 7–9 record and missed the playoffs. In the 1985 preseason, Floyd re-injured his knee and was placed on the IRL. The Jets waived Floyd in October 1985 (an NFL process in which a team releases a player and makes him available to all other NFL teams), after which he retired. When he played in the NFL, Floyd stood at 5 feet 11 inches (180 cm) and weighed 190 pounds (86 kg).

== Personal life ==
As a junior in high school, Floyd wanted to join the United States Army. By his senior year in college, he wanted to play professionally for a team in Texas. He majored in physical education at EKU, a subject he wanted to teach before being drafted. Before reporting to training camp for New York, Floyd worked as a student teacher at Tates Creek Junior High School in Lexington, Kentucky. After his NFL career, Floyd was employed as an assistant coach at Bellevue High School in Kentucky. He taught physical education for eighteen years at Bellevue and Boone County High Schools. As of 2023, he is a defensive backs coach for Conner High School in Kentucky and works as an assistant principal at Boone County High School. Floyd has a master's degree from Northern Kentucky University.

Floyd has two sisters and a brother; he married Cheryl Johnson in March 1983. Floyd's two sons played college football, one for the Louisville Cardinals and another for Louisville and the Chattanooga Mocs.

After the murder of George Floyd, an unrelated Black American man, in Minneapolis in May 2020, a photograph of the football player was erroneously included in a montage at the funeral. The montage was broadcast on various news networks.
