= 1976 New York Jets season =

1976 season of NFL team New York Jets

- Owner: Leon Hess
- Head coach: Lou Holtz (resigned following Week 13, 3–10 record); Mike Holovak (interim, 0–1 record)
- Home stadium: Shea Stadium

Results
- Record: 3–11
- Division place: 4th AFC East
- Playoffs: Did not qualify
- Pro Bowlers: None

The 1976 New York Jets season was the seventeenth season for the team and the seventh in the National Football League. It began with the team trying to improve upon its 3–11 record from 1975 under new head coach Lou Holtz. The Jets again finished with a record of 3–11, which combined with the resignation of Holtz with one game left in the season to become coach at the University of Arkansas, prompted John Facenda to say about the Jets during the NFL Films highlight film for that season “Perhaps the best thing to say about the 1976 New York Jets season is that it’s over”.

The only teams that the Jets defeated in 1976 were the 2–12 Buffalo Bills (twice) and the 0–14 Tampa Bay Buccaneers. The Jets were 0–9 vs. teams with a winning record.

The 1976 season was also the twelfth and final year with the Jets for quarterback Joe Namath. (Note: Namath would play one final season with the 1977 L.A. Rams)

== Offseason ==
=== 1976 expansion draft ===
New York Jets selected during the expansion draft
Round	Overall	Name	Position	Expansion team
0	0	Anthony Davis	Running back	Tampa Bay Buccaneers
0	0	Jerry Davis	Defensive back	Seattle Seahawks
0	0	Larry Woods	Defensive tackle	Seattle Seahawks

=== Draft ===
1976 New York Jets draft
Round	Pick	Player	Position	College	Notes
1	6	Richard Todd	Quarterback	Alabama	
2	33	Shafer Suggs	Safety	Ball State	
3	67	Greg Buttle	Linebacker	Penn State	
5	129	Steve King	Offensive tackle	Michigan	
6	163	Bob Martin	Linebacker	Nebraska	
7	188	Abdul Salaam	Defensive end	Kent State	
7	199	James Richards	Running back	Florida	
8	211	Joe Davis	Guard	USC	
8	214	Louie Giammona	Running back	Utah State	
9	244	Ronnie Moore	Wide receiver	VMI	
11	296	Lawrence Pillers	Defensive end	Alcorn State	
12	326	Don Buckey	Wide receiver	North Carolina State	
12	327	Dave Buckey	Quarterback	North Carolina State	
14	380	Al Gluchoski	Center	West Virginia	
15	410	Rick Faulk	Punter	San Francisco State	
16	437	James Godwin	Running back	Fayetteville	
17	464	Darwin Willie	Tight end	Tulane	
Made roster † Pro Football Hall of Fame * Made at least one Pro Bowl during career

== Personnel ==
=== Staff ===
1976 New York Jets staff
Front office: Leon Hess – Owner; Al Ward – General manager; Mike Holovak – Director of player personnel; Carroll Huntress – Scout; Connie Nicholas – Scout; Head coaches: Lou Holtz – Head coach (first 13 games); Mike Holovak – Interim head coach (final game); Offensive coaches: Dan Henning – Wide receivers; Joe Gardi – Tight ends/special teams; Bob Fry – Offensive line	Defensive coaches: Walt Michaels – Defensive coordinator

=== Roster ===
1976 New York Jets roster
Quarterbacks (QB): 11 Steve Joachim; 12 Joe Namath; 14 Richard Todd; Running backs (RB): 35 Steve Davis; 21 Clark Gaines; 45 Louie Giammona; 38 Bob Gresham; Wide receivers (WR): 83 Jerome Barkum; 84 Clint Haslerig; 82 David Knight; 89 Lou Piccone; 80 Howard Satterwhite; Tight ends (TE): 88 Rich Caster; 86 Richard Osborne	Offensive linemen (OL): 67 Darrell Austin G/C; 65 Joe Fields C; 75 Winston Hill T; 71 Al Krevis T; 78 Garry Puetz G/T; 66 Randy Rasmussen G; 61 John Roman T; 72 Robert Woods T; Defensive linemen (DL): 77 Carl Barzilauskas DT; 74 Larry Faulk DT; 85 Ed Galigher DT; 81 Richard Neal DE; 76 Lawrence Pillers DE	Linebackers (LB): 51 Greg Buttle OLB; 55 John Ebersole MLB; 52 Mike Hennigan OLB; 59 Bob Martin OLB; 56 Larry Keller OLB; 54 Steve Poole MLB; Defensive backs (DB): 47 Tommy Marvaso SS; 22 Burgess Owens FS; 46 Rich Sowells CB; 23 Shafer Suggs CB; 38 Ed Taylor CB; 27 Phil Wise SS; Special teams (ST): 3 Duane Carrell P; 5 Pat Leahy K	Reserve: -- Don Coleman LB (IR); -- Joe Davis G (IR); -- Steve King T (IR); -- Mark Lomas DE (IR); 49 Ed Marinaro RB (IR); 50 Wayne Mulligan C (IR); 87 Billy Newsome DE (IR); 53 Carl Russ LB (IR); -- Clarence Sanders LB (PUP); 48 Ken Schroy S (IR); Rookies in italics

== Schedule ==
Week	Date	Opponent	Result	Record	Venue	Attendance
1	September 12	at Cleveland Browns	**L** 17–38	0–1	Cleveland Stadium	67,496
2	September 19	at Denver Broncos	**L** 3–46	0–2	Mile High Stadium	62,669
3	September 26	at **Miami Dolphins**	**L** 0–16	0–3	Miami Orange Bowl	49,754
4	October 3	at San Francisco 49ers	**L** 6–17	0–4	Candlestick Park	42,961
5	October 10	**Buffalo Bills**	**W** 17–14	1–4	Shea Stadium	59,110
6	October 18	at **New England Patriots**	**L** 7–41	1–5	Schaefer Stadium	50,883
7	October 24	**Baltimore Colts**	**L** 0–20	1–6	Shea Stadium	59,576
8	October 31	at **Buffalo Bills**	**W** 19–14	2–6	Rich Stadium	41,285
9	November 7	**Miami Dolphins**	**L** 7–27	2–7	Shea Stadium	53,344
10	November 14	Tampa Bay Buccaneers	**W** 34–0	3–7	Shea Stadium	46,426
11	November 21	**New England Patriots**	**L** 24–38	3–8	Shea Stadium	49,983
12	November 28	at **Baltimore Colts**	**L** 16–33	3–9	Memorial Stadium	44,023
13	December 5	Washington Redskins	**L** 16–37	3–10	Shea Stadium	46,638
14	December 12	Cincinnati Bengals	**L** 3–42	3–11	Shea Stadium	31,067
Note: Intra-division opponents are in **bold** text.

=== Standings ===
AFC East
	W	L	T	PCT	DIV	CONF	PF	PA	STK
Baltimore Colts^{(2)}	11	3	0	.786	7–1	11–1	417	246	W1
New England Patriots^{(4)}	11	3	0	.786	6–2	10–2	376	236	W6
Miami Dolphins	6	8	0	.429	5–3	6–6	263	264	L1
New York Jets	3	11	0	.214	2–6	3–9	169	383	L4
Buffalo Bills	2	12	0	.143	0–8	2–10	245	363	L10

== In popular culture ==
- The television series Barney Miller referenced the game between the Buccaneers playing in New York versus the Jets, in the third-season episode “The Recluse”, in which Yemana (Jack Soo) had tickets to the Jets/Tampa Bay game. When asked “Why?’, his response, “They were on sale”. The Tampa Bay Buccaneers finished 0–14 the same season.
