= 1983 Pro Bowl =

National Football League all-star game

1983 NFL Pro Bowl
AFC	NFC
19	20
Head coach: Walt Michaels (New York Jets)	Head coach: Tom Landry (Dallas Cowboys)
	1	2	3	4	Total
AFC	9	3	7	0	19
NFC	0	10	0	10	20
- Date: February 6, 1983
- Stadium: Aloha Stadium; Honolulu, Hawaii
- Co-MVPs: Dan Fouts (San Diego Chargers), John Jefferson (Green Bay Packers)
- Referee: Fred Silva
- Attendance: 47,207

TV in the United States
- Network: ABC
- Announcers: Frank Gifford, Howard Cosell, Fran Tarkenton & Lynn Swann

The 1983 Pro Bowl was the NFL's 33rd annual all-star game which featured the outstanding performers from the 1982 season. The game was played on Sunday, February 6, 1983, at Aloha Stadium in Honolulu, Hawaii before a crowd of 47,207. The final score was NFC 20, AFC 19.

Walt Michaels of the New York Jets led the AFC team against an NFC team coached by Dallas Cowboys head coach Tom Landry. The referee was Fred Silva.

Dan Fouts of the San Diego Chargers and John Jefferson of the Green Bay Packers were named the game's Most Valuable Players. A late touchdown pass from Danny White of the Dallas Cowboys to Jefferson provided the NFC margin of victory.

Players on the winning NFC team received $10,000 apiece while the AFC participants each took home $5,000 which were double the payouts of the previous year.

== AFC roster ==
=== Offense ===
Position	Starter(s)	Reserve(s)
Quarterback	14 Dan Fouts, San Diego	14 Ken Anderson, Cincinnati
Running back	32 Marcus Allen, L.A. Raiders; 24 Freeman McNeil, N.Y. Jets	46 Chuck Muncie, San Diego
Fullback	37 Andra Franklin, Miami	
Wide receiver	89 Wes Chandler, San Diego; 80 Cris Collinsworth, Cincinnati	85 Wesley Walker, N.Y. Jets; 82 John Stallworth, Pittsburgh
Tight end	89 Kellen Winslow, San Diego	89 Dan Ross, Cincinnati
Offensive tackle	78 Anthony Muñoz, Cincinnati; 79 Marvin Powell, New York Jets	79 Larry Brown, Pittsburgh
Offensive guard	73 John Hannah, New England; 63 Doug Wilkerson, San Diego	64 Ed Newman, Miami
Center	65 Joe Fields, N.Y. Jets	52 Mike Webster, Pittsburgh

=== Defense ===
Position	Starter(s)	Reserve(s)
Defensive end	99 Mark Gastineau, N.Y. Jets; 67 Art Still, Kansas City	77 Ben Williams, Buffalo
Defensive tackle	79 Gary Johnson, San Diego; 76 Fred Smerlas, Buffalo	73 Bob Baumhower, Miami
Outside linebacker	52 Robert Brazile, Houston; 83 Ted Hendricks, L.A. Raiders	56 Chip Banks, Cleveland
Inside linebacker	58 Jack Lambert, Pittsburgh	53 Randy Gradishar, Denver
Cornerback	37 Lester Hayes, L.A. Raiders; 40 Mike Haynes, New England	24 Gary Green, Kansas City
Free safety	26 Gary Barbaro, Kansas City	
Strong safety	31 Donnie Shell, Pittsburgh	45 Kenny Easley, Seattle

=== Special teams ===
Position	Starter(s)	Reserve(s)
Punter	11 Luke Prestridge, Denver	
Placekicker	6 Rolf Benirschke, San Diego	
Kick returner	80 Rick Upchurch, Denver	

== NFC roster ==
=== Offense ===
Position	Starter(s)	Reserve(s)
Quarterback	7 Joe Theismann, Washington	11 Danny White, Dallas
Running back	33 Tony Dorsett, Dallas	38 George Rogers, New Orleans; 20 Billy Sims, Detroit
Fullback	31 William Andrews, Atlanta	
Wide receiver	87 Dwight Clark, San Francisco; 80 James Lofton, Green Bay	87 Charlie Brown, Washington; 83 John Jefferson, Green Bay
Tight end	88 Jimmie Giles, Tampa Bay	82 Paul Coffman, Green Bay
Offensive tackle	67 Pat Donovan, Dallas; 78 Mike Kenn, Atlanta	70 Keith Dorney, Detroit
Offensive guard	51 Randy Cross, San Francisco; 68 R. C. Thielemann, Atlanta	72 Kent Hill, Los Angeles Rams
Center	57 Jeff Van Note, Atlanta	54 Larry McCarren, Green Bay

=== Defense ===
Position	Starter(s)	Reserve(s)
Defensive end	72 Ed Jones, Dallas; 63 Lee Roy Selmon, Tampa Bay	68 Dennis Harrison, Philadelphia
Defensive tackle	54 Randy White, Dallas; 78 Doug English, Detroit	99 Dan Hampton, Chicago
Outside linebacker	56 Lawrence Taylor, N.Y. Giants; 53 Hugh Green, Tampa Bay	59 Matt Blair, Minnesota
Inside linebacker	53 Harry Carson, N.Y. Giants	53 Bob Breunig, Dallas
Cornerback	24 Everson Walls, Dallas; 36 Mark Haynes, N.Y. Giants	42 Ronnie Lott, San Francisco
Free safety	21 Nolan Cromwell, L.A. Rams	22 Dwight Hicks, San Francisco
Strong safety	23 Tony Peters, Washington	

=== Special teams ===
Position	Starter(s)	Reserve(s)
Punter	13 Dave Jennings, N.Y. Giants	
Placekicker	3 Mark Moseley, Washington	
Kick returner	21 Mike Nelms, Washington	
