= Richard Todd (American football) =

American football player (born 1953)

No. 14, 11
- Position: Quarterback

Personal information
- Born: November 19, 1953 (age 72); Birmingham, Alabama, U.S.
- Listed height: 6 ft 2 in (1.88 m)
- Listed weight: 207 lb (94 kg)

Career information
- High school: Davidson (Mobile, Alabama)
- College: Alabama (1972–1975)
- NFL draft: 1976: 1st round, 6th overall pick

Career history
- New York Jets (1976–1983); New Orleans Saints (1984–1985); New York Jets (1986)

Awards and highlights
- National champion (1973); First-team All-SEC (1975)

Career NFL statistics
- Passing attempts: 2,967
- Passing completions: 1,610
- Completion percentage: 54.3%
- TD–INT: 124–161
- Passing yards: 20,610
- Passer rating: 67.6
- Rushing yards: 932
- Rushing touchdowns: 14
- Stats at Pro Football Reference

Carl Richard Todd (born November 19, 1953) is an American former professional football player who was a quarterback for the New York Jets and New Orleans Saints of the National Football League (NFL) from 1976 to 1986. Like former Jets quarterback Joe Namath and Raiders quarterback Ken Stabler, he played college football for the Alabama Crimson Tide under coach Paul "Bear" Bryant. Todd was selected by the Jets in the first round of the 1976 NFL draft with the sixth overall pick.

== College career ==
In high school, Todd attended Davidson High School in Mobile, Alabama. Individually, Todd owned the state shot-put record at the time. He then went on to play for Bear Bryant at the University of Alabama, where he was a three-year starter at quarterback. During his time at Alabama, the Crimson Tide ran the wishbone offense. In his sophomore year, Todd shared the quarterback position with Gary Rutledge. In a game against Virginia Tech, which the Tide won 77–6, Todd was one of four backs who ran for over 100 yards. The 1973 season concluded in the Sugar Bowl, with a 24–23 loss to Notre Dame, for the 1973 National Championship. In that game, Todd caught a 25-yard touchdown pass.

In 1974, injuries plagued Todd. The Tide went on to have a rematch with Notre Dame, this time in the Orange Bowl. Todd threw for Alabama's only touchdown in the fourth quarter and helped convert two points, but the Tide again lost to Notre Dame, 13–11. In the Sugar Bowl at the end of the 1975 season, his college career ended in New Orleans against Penn State. Todd threw for over 200 yards, and led Alabama to its first bowl victory in eight years. Alabama never lost an SEC game or beat Notre Dame while Richard Todd was the starting quarterback

- 1973: 18/33 for 325 yards with 4 TD vs 2 INT. 560 yards and 2 TD rushing.
- 1974: 36/67 for 656 yards with 5 TD vs 2 INT. 265 yards and 5 TD rushing.
- 1975: 47/89 for 661 yards with 7 TD vs 3 INT. 429 yards and 9 TD rushing.

He would end his college career with 16 TD and 7 INT in 189 PA while running for 1,254 yards and 16 TD.

== Professional career ==
The New York Jets selected Todd sixth overall in the first round of the 1976 NFL draft. Todd would be the last Alabama quarterback taken in the first round until Tua Tagovailoa, who was selected by the Miami Dolphins as the fifth overall pick of the 2020 NFL draft. The intention was for Todd to replace another Alabama legend, Joe Namath, who had led the Jets to their last playoff win in Super Bowl III in 1969. Todd stated that playing on the same team with Namath was "a dream come true." After the 1976 season, Namath was released and Todd, who was 23 years old, was named the starter.

In his first five seasons, he threw more interceptions than touchdowns and was booed by fans and criticized by the press. He is also known for an incident in which he shoved reporter Steve Serby into a locker after Serby supported backup quarterback Matt Robinson as starter, instead of him. In a 1980 game against the San Francisco 49ers, in which the Jets had fallen far behind early, Todd, throwing under a prevent zone defense, set a then-NFL record with 42 completions (the record would stand until Drew Bledsoe completed 45 passes in a single game during the 1994 season); the 49ers however won the game, 37–27. Todd threw 30 interceptions in 1980, and the Jets finished 4–12. Late in the 1980 season, Todd's Jets hosted the winless New Orleans Saints; Todd completed only 10 of 27 passes and was intercepted twice, as the Saints grabbed a 21–20 win for their only win of the 1980 season. Also that year, Todd set an NFL record for throwing an interception in 15 games in one season.

In 1981, Todd led the Walt Michaels-coached Jets to their first winning record (10–5–1) since 1969, thanks in part to a defense nicknamed the "New York Sack Exchange." In the AFC Wild Card Playoff game against the Buffalo Bills, he led a comeback after the team had fallen behind, 24–0, but fell short, as a late pass was intercepted near the Bills' goal line. The following year, he led the Jets back to the playoffs. New York defeated the defending AFC champion Cincinnati Bengals, 44–17, then beat the Los Angeles Raiders, 17–14, before facing the Dolphins in Miami in the AFC Championship Game. The game was played in the mud and rain, where Todd threw five interceptions in the game and the Jets lost, 14–0. His final year with New York saw a change at head coach, as Walt Michaels was replaced with Jets offensive coordinator Joe Walton. The Jets finished the season at 7-9 and Todd was traded to the New Orleans Saints after the season. His final game as a Jet was ignominious, as he not only threw two interceptions that were returned for a touchdown by the same player (Miami's Mike Kozlowski), but also drew a 15-yard unsportsmanlike penalty for throwing the ball at defensive tackle Mike Charles after a sack.

Todd played only two seasons in New Orleans, as he replaced another aging, interception-prone (and former Super Bowl winning) Alabama legend at quarterback, Ken Stabler. His first year with the Saints was the worst year of his career, as he threw 19 interceptions and just 11 touchdown passes. In 1985, the Saints went 5–11, a troubling season that included changes in coaching and ownership, and saw Todd losing playing time to Louisiana native Bobby Hebert, who had come to the Saints from the USFL, where he had won a championship with the Michigan Panthers.

Todd briefly returned to the Jets in 1986 after a knee injury to then QB Ken O’Brien, but did not play.

According to The New York Times, Todd was released from the Jets on October 29, 1986.

Todd finished his career with 1,610 completions in 2,967 attempts for 20,610 yards and 124 touchdowns, with 161 interceptions. He also rushed for 932 yards and 14 touchdowns.

== Personal ==
On Nov. 9, 2026, Todd was the reported victim of an assault at his Florence, Ala., home. His wife, Debra Darby "Lulu" Todd, was arrested and charged with a count of second-degree domestic violence. Court records allege that Debra Todd struck Richard Todd multiple times with a pair of pliers during a domestic incident. Richard Todd did not seek treatment at a hospital.

== NFL career statistics ==
Legend
	Led the league
**Bold**	Career high

=== Regular season ===
Year	Team	Games			Passing									Rushing					Sacks	
Year	Team	GP	GS	Record	Cmp	Att	Pct	Yds	Y/A	Lng	TD	Int	Rtg	Att	Yds	Avg	Lng	TD	Sck	Yds
1976	NYJ	13	6	2–4	65	162	40.1	870	5.4	44	3	12	33.2	28	107	3.8	22	1	29	233
1977	NYJ	12	11	3–8	133	265	50.2	1,863	7.0	**87**	11	17	60.3	24	46	1.9	13	2	24	203
1978	NYJ	5	5	2–3	60	107	56.1	849	7.9	49	6	10	61.6	14	18	1.3	10	0	15	122
1979	NYJ	15	15	8–7	171	334	51.2	2,660	**8.0**	72	16	22	66.5	36	93	2.6	21	**5**	25	222
1980	NYJ	**16**	**16**	4–12	264	479	55.1	3,329	6.9	55	17	**30**	62.7	**49**	**330**	**6.7**	**31**	**5**	**42**	**326**
1981	NYJ	**16**	**16**	**10–5–1**	279	497	56.1	3,231	6.5	49	**25**	13	81.8	32	131	4.1	19	0	30	224
1982	NYJ	9	9	6–3	153	261	58.6	1,961	7.5	56	14	8	**87.3**	13	-5	-0.4	7	1	23	206
1983	NYJ	**16**	**16**	7–9	**308**	**518**	**59.5**	**3,478**	6.7	64	18	26	70.3	35	101	2.9	17	0	**42**	314
1984	NOR	15	14	6–8	161	312	51.6	2,178	7.0	74	11	19	60.6	28	111	4.0	15	0	33	267
1985	NOR	2	0	0–0	16	32	50.0	191	6.0	56	3	4	60.3	0	0	0.0	0	0	1	10
Career		119	108	48–59–1	1,610	2,967	54.3	20,610	6.9	87	124	161	67.6	259	932	3.6	31	14	264	2,127

=== Playoffs ===
Year	Team	Games			Passing									Rushing					Sacks	
Year	Team	GP	GS	Record	Cmp	Att	Pct	Yds	Y/A	Lng	TD	Int	Rtg	Att	Yds	Avg	Lng	TD	Sck	Yds
1981	NYJ	1	1	0–1	28	51	54.9	377	**7.4**	37	**2**	4	**59.0**	2	11	**5.5**	11	0	5	29
1982	NYJ	**3**	**3**	**2–1**	**50**	**89**	**56.2**	**649**	7.3	**49**	**2**	**8**	49.3	**12**	**21**	1.8	**12**	0	**8**	**51**
Career		4	4	2–2	78	140	55.7	1,026	7.3	49	4	12	52.9	14	32	2.3	12	0	13	80

== See also ==
- List of NFL quarterbacks who have posted a perfect passer rating
- List of NFL quarterbacks who have posted a passer rating of zero
- List of most consecutive starts by a National Football League quarterback
