= Pat Leahy (American football) =

American football player (born 1951)

No. 5
- Position: Placekicker

Personal information
- Born: March 19, 1951 (age 75); St. Louis, Missouri, U.S.
- Listed height: 6 ft 0 in (1.83 m)
- Listed weight: 194 lb (88 kg)

Career information
- High school: Augustinian (St. Louis)
- College: Saint Louis
- NFL draft: 1973: undrafted

Career history
- St. Louis Cardinals (1973–1974)*; New York Jets (1974–1991)
- * Offseason or practice squad member only

Awards and highlights
- First-team All-Pro (1978)

Career NFL statistics
- Field goals attempted: 426
- Field goals made: 304
- Field goal percentage: 71.4%
- Longest field goal: 55
- Extra points attempted: 584
- Extra points made: 558
- Extra point percentage: 95.5%
- Points scored: 1,470
- Stats at Pro Football Reference

Patrick Joseph Leahy (born March 19, 1951) is an American former professional football player who was a placekicker for the New York Jets of the National Football League (NFL). He played college soccer for the Saint Louis Billikens.

== Early life ==
Leahy attended Augustinian Academy. He accepted a soccer scholarship from Saint Louis University. As a starting midfielder, he helped lead the school to 4 soccer NCAA finals, winning 3 national championships, while also receiving All-American honors.

In 1994, he was inducted into the Billiken Hall of Fame. In 2007, he was inducted into the Missouri Sports Hall of Fame Inductee.

== Professional career ==
=== St. Louis Cardinals ===
Leahy was signed as an undrafted free agent by the St. Louis Cardinals after the 1973 NFL draft, having participated in an open try-out, even though he didn't play football in college.

In 1974, he was re-signed to be a part of training camp. Even though the Cardinals made the unusual move of keeping 2 kickers on the final roster, they chose to keep Jim Bakken and fellow rookie and ex-soccer player Sergio Albert. Leahy was waived on August 29.

=== New York Jets ===
In 1974 he was signed by the New York Jets as a free agent, after Bobby Howfield suffered a leg injury. He began on a standby basis until replacing Howfield.

In 1979 he suffered a right knee sprain during a practice while running pass patterns simulating an opposing team's wide receiver. He played in only 6 games after being placed on the injured reserve list.

In 1985 he set the franchise record for the longest field goal of 55 yards. In 1986, he set the franchise record for consecutive successful field goals made with 22, which was broken by Jay Feely in 2009.

In 1991, he played in 15 games but was replaced by Raul Allegre for the season finale because of a sciatic nerve condition.

On July 6, 1992, he announced his retirement because of a recurring sciatic nerve condition in his right leg. At the time, he ranked third in scoring in NFL history, was the Jets all-time leading scorer, with 1,470 points and scored 100 points or more in seven seasons. Over the course of his career, Leahy completed 71.4% of his field goal attempts and 95.5% of his extra points. He currently ranks 24th on the list of highest NFL career scoring leaders.

== Career regular season statistics ==
Career high/best bolded

Regular season statistics
Season	Team (record)	G	FGM	FGA	%	<20	20-29	30-39	40-49	50+	LNG	BLK	XPM	XPA	%	PTS
1974	NYJ (7–7)	6	6	11	54.5	0–0	3–5	2–4	1–2	0–0	45	0	18	19	94.7	36
1975	NYJ (3–11)	14	13	21	61.9	0–0	3–3	3–5	7–12	0–1	47	0	27	30	90.0	66
1976	NYJ (3–11)	14	11	16	68.8	1–1	5–5	3–5	2–5	0–0	47	0	16	20	80.0	49
1977	NYJ (3–11)	14	15	25	60.0	0–1	7–8	6–8	2–6	0–2	48	0	18	21	85.7	63
1978	NYJ (8–8)	**16**	22	30	73.3	2–2	5–5	9–12	6–9	0–2	47	0	41	42	97.6	107
1979	NYJ (8–8)	6	8	13	61.5	1–1	2–2	5–8	0–2	0–0	34	0	12	15	80.0	36
1980	NYJ (4–12)	**16**	14	22	63.6	0–0	4–4	4–9	6–8	0–1	49	0	36	36	**100.0**	78
1981	NYJ (10–5–1)	**16**	25	36	69.4	0–0	11–13	6–8	**8–12**	0–3	49	0	38	39	97.4	113
1982	NYJ (6–3)	9	11	17	64.7	1–1	3–5	4–5	3–6	0–0	49	0	26	31	83.9	59
1983	NYJ (7–9)	**16**	16	24	66.7	**4–4**	3–4	5–7	4–8	0–1	49	0	36	37	97.3	84
1984	NYJ (7–9)	**16**	17	24	70.8	2–2	5–6	7–8	2–5	1–3	52	0	38	39	97.4	89
1985	NYJ (11–5)	**16**	**26**	34	76.5	2–2	11–11	6–8	4–8	**3–5**	**55**	0	43	**45**	95.6	**121**
1986	NYJ (10–6)	**16**	16	19	84.2	1–1	5–5	4–4	5–8	1–1	50	0	**44**	44	**100.0**	92
1987	NYJ (6–9)	12	18	22	81.8	0–0	11–11	5–6	2–4	0–1	42	0	31	31	**100.0**	85
1988	NYJ (8–7–1)	**16**	23	28	82.1	0–0	9–9	7–8	7–10	0–1	48	0	43	43	**100.0**	112
1989	NYJ (4–12)	**16**	14	21	66.7	1–1	6–7	3–4	4–8	0–1	46	0	29	30	96.7	71
1990	NYJ (6–10)	**16**	23	26	**88.5**	2–2	12–12	6–7	3–5	0–0	47	0	32	32	**100.0**	101
1991	NYJ (8–8)	15	**26**	**37**	70.3	3–3	**13–16**	**9–11**	1–5	0–2	40	0	30	30	**100.0**	108
Career (18 seasons)		250	304	426	71.4	20–21	118–131	94–127	67–123	5–24	55	0	558	584	95.5	1470

== Personal life ==
Leahy and his wife, Colleen, currently live in St. Louis and have three children: Lizzy, Cullen, and the youngest Nora.
