= Jerome Barkum =

American football player (born 1950)

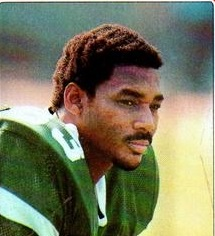

No. 83
- Positions: Wide receiver, tight end

Personal information
- Born: July 18, 1950 (age 76); Gulfport, Mississippi, U.S.
- Listed height: 6 ft 4 in (1.93 m)
- Listed weight: 218 lb (99 kg)

Career information
- High school: 33rd Avenue (Gulfport)
- College: Jackson State
- NFL draft: 1972: 1st round, 9th overall pick

Career history
- New York Jets (1972–1983)

Awards and highlights
- Pro Bowl (1973); First-team Little All-American (1971)

Career NFL statistics
- Receptions: 326
- Receiving yards: 4,789
- Receiving TDs: 40
- Stats at Pro Football Reference

Jerome Phillip Barkum (born July 18, 1950) is an American former professional football player who was a wide receiver and tight end for 12 years with the New York Jets of the National Football League (NFL).

== Football career ==
He was drafted by the Jets out of Jackson State University with the ninth overall pick in the first round of the 1972 NFL draft. At Jackson State, Barkum was selected to the 1971 Little All-America Team as a Wide Receiver.

In his second year with the Jets in 1973, he was selected to the Pro Bowl as a WR. Later in his career, Barkum transitioned to the Tight End position, remaining a viable go-to receiver for the Jets offense. In his career, Barkum recorded 40 touchdown receptions, but was noted for rarely spiking the football at a time when such celebrations were increasingly frequent.

Barkum's most memorable catch in the NFL was made in Shea Stadium in a 1981 clash against the Miami Dolphins in the last seconds of the game to lift the Jets to victory 16–15. The Jets made the playoffs that year for the first time since their loss to the Chiefs in the 1969 AFL Divisional Round.

In the 1982 season, Barkum was a part of the Jets team that made it to the AFC Championship. He was released by the Jets after the 1983 season. Barkum's 40 touchdown receptions rank him fourth in Jets history.

He briefly attended the 1984 preseason camp with the New York Giants, but was waived before the season started. Roughly one month later, the Washington Redskins brought Barkum to camp for a tryout in the wake of several injuries, but he was officially cut on August 28, 1984.

In 2011, Barkum joined two other players in a class action lawsuit against the NFL regarding head injuries.

== NFL career statistics ==
Legend
| **Bold** | Career high |

=== Regular season ===
| Year | Team | Games | | Receiving | | | | |
| Year | Team | GP | GS | Rec | Yds | Avg | Lng | TD |
|---|---|---|---|---|---|---|---|---|
| 1972 | NYJ | 14 | 1 | 16 | 304 | **19.0** | 52 | 2 |
| 1973 | NYJ | 14 | 14 | **44** | **810** | 18.4 | **63** | 6 |
| 1974 | NYJ | 14 | 14 | 41 | 524 | 12.8 | 39 | 3 |
| 1975 | NYJ | 13 | 13 | 36 | 549 | 15.3 | 56 | 5 |
| 1976 | NYJ | 4 | 3 | 5 | 54 | 10.8 | 25 | 1 |
| 1977 | NYJ | 14 | 14 | 26 | 450 | 17.3 | 40 | 6 |
| 1978 | NYJ | **16** | **16** | 28 | 391 | 14.0 | 27 | 3 |
| 1979 | NYJ | 13 | 13 | 27 | 401 | 14.9 | 40 | 4 |
| 1980 | NYJ | **16** | 11 | 13 | 244 | 18.8 | 28 | 1 |
| 1981 | NYJ | **16** | **16** | 39 | 495 | 12.7 | 40 | **7** |
| 1982 | NYJ | 9 | 9 | 19 | 182 | 9.6 | 29 | 1 |
| 1983 | NYJ | 15 | 13 | 32 | 385 | 12.0 | 34 | 1 |
| | | 158 | 137 | 326 | 4,789 | 14.7 | 63 | 40 |

=== Playoffs ===
| Year | Team | Games | | Receiving | | | | |
| Year | Team | GP | GS | Rec | Yds | Avg | Lng | TD |
|---|---|---|---|---|---|---|---|---|
| 1981 | NYJ | 1 | 1 | 2 | **41** | **20.5** | **37** | 0 |
| 1982 | NYJ | **3** | **3** | **4** | 40 | 10.0 | 12 | 0 |
| | | 4 | 4 | 6 | 81 | 13.5 | 37 | 0 |

== Post-Football ==
In 2013, Barkum founded and became CEO of Smooth Jams Jazz on Roku TV and via website apps.
