= Howard Satterwhite =

American football player (born 1953)

No. 80, 28
- Position: Wide receiver

Personal information
- Born: May 24, 1953 (age 73); Monthalia, Texas, U.S.
- Listed height: 5 ft 11 in (1.80 m)
- Listed weight: 185 lb (84 kg)

Career information
- High school: Flatonia (TX)
- College: Sam Houston State
- NFL draft: 1974: undrafted

Career history
- Washington Redskins (1974)*; Chicago Bears (1975)*; New York Jets (1976); Baltimore Colts (1977)
- * Offseason or practice squad member only
- Stats at Pro Football Reference

Howard Satterwhite (born May 24, 1953) is an American former professional football player who was a wide receiver in the National Football League (NFL). He played college football for the Sam Houston State Bearkats. He played in the NFL for the New York Jets in 1976 and for the Baltimore Colts in 1977.
