= Steve Serby =

American sports reporter

- Born: July 22, 1949 (age 77); Brooklyn, New York, U.S.
- Education: Ohio University
- Occupation: Sportswriter
- Writing career
- Period: 1972–present
- Subject: Sports

Stephan Carey Serby (born July 22, 1949) is a sports reporter who writes for the New York Post. Although known primarily as a New York Jets beat reporter, he has also written many columns on other National Football League franchises, particularly the New York Giants. He has also written or co-authored books on several different sports and sports figures.

== Early life ==
Serby received a Bachelor of Journalism from Ohio University in 1971. He took an entry-level position with the Post in 1972, was promoted to an editorial assistant in September 1972 only a week later and was elevated to sportswriter in 1972.

== Career ==
Serby was named the Post's New York Jets beat writer in 1977 and became a national NFL columnist in 1983. He has also contributed Mock Drafts during the NFL Draft season.

In addition to his NFL writing, he writes throughout the year on various New York sports teams, including the Knicks, Yankees, Mets, and St. John's University basketball.

Since 2004, he has written a "Sunday Q&A" column, interviewing notable sports figures.

=== Books ===
Serby co-authored Lawrence Taylor's autobiography, LT: Over The Edge: Tackling Quarterbacks, Drugs, and a World Beyond Football in 1987. In 2009 he wrote No Substitute for Sundays: Brett Favre and His Year in the Huddle with the New York Jets.

=== Controversy ===
In football circles, he is remembered for a physical confrontation with Jets quarterback Richard Todd in which Serby was pushed into a locker as a result of Serby's support for back-up Matt Robinson for the starter's job. Al Sharpton verbally attacked both Steve Serby and his employer for a column in which Serby commended Tom Coughlin for putting star wide receiver Plaxico Burress on the injured reserve list after an incident where Burress shot himself in the leg with an unlicensed firearm.

== Awards and honors ==
Serby was named the 2025 New York Sportswriter of the Year.
