= Walt Michaels =

American football player and coach (1929–2019)

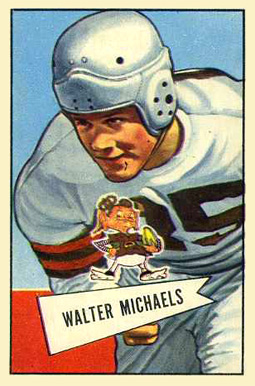
- Michaels on a 1952 Bowman football card

No. 35, 34
- Position: Linebacker

Personal information
- Born: October 16, 1929; Swoyersville, Pennsylvania, U.S.
- Died: July 10, 2019 (aged 89); Plains, Pennsylvania, U.S.
- Listed height: 6 ft 0 in (1.83 m)
- Listed weight: 231 lb (105 kg)

Career information
- College: Washington and Lee (1947–1950)
- NFL draft: 1951: 7th round, 86th overall pick

Career history

Playing
- Green Bay Packers (1951); Cleveland Browns (1952–1961); New York Jets (1963)

Coaching
- Oakland Raiders (1962) Defensive backs coach; New York Jets (1963–1972) Defensive coordinator; Philadelphia Eagles (1973–1975) Defensive coordinator; New York Jets (1976) Defensive coordinator; New York Jets (1977–1982) Head coach; New Jersey Generals (1984–1985) Head coach; Scranton Stallions (1990) Head coach

Awards and highlights
- 2× NFL champion (1954-1955); Second-team All-Pro (1958); 5× Pro Bowl (1955–1959); Cleveland Browns Legends

Career NFL/AFL statistics
- Interceptions: 11
- Fumble recoveries: 8
- Total touchdowns: 2
- Stats at Pro Football Reference

Head coaching record
- Regular season: 39–47–1 (.454)
- Postseason: 2–2 (.500)
- Career: 41–49–1 (.456)
- Coaching profile at Pro Football Reference

Walter Edward Michaels (originally Majka) (October 16, 1929 – July 10, 2019) was an American professional football player and coach who was best remembered for his six-year tenure as head coach of the National Football League (NFL)'s New York Jets from 1977 to 1982. In 1977, Michaels was inducted into the Virginia Sports Hall of Fame, the National Polish American Sports Hall of Fame and into the Suffolk Sports Hall of Fame on Long Island in the football Category with the Class of 1997.

== Early life and playing career ==
=== Collegiate and early NFL career ===
Michaels was born to a Polish family, son of a coal miner from Swoyersville, Pennsylvania. The family's surname is originally Majka, but was anglicized to Michaels in school. Michaels was a two-sport athlete at the local high school, then went on to play collegiately as a fullback at Washington & Lee University. During the 1950 season, he helped the Generals reach the Gator Bowl, but was unable to play in the contest due to an appendicitis attack he suffered one week before the New Year's Day game. In the 1951 NFL draft, he was selected in the seventh round by the Cleveland Browns, but was traded to the Green Bay Packers during the summer training camp. Michaels was used primarily on special teams during his rookie season in Green Bay.

=== Return to Cleveland Browns (1952–61) ===
On April 29, 1952, Michaels was traded back to the Browns for three offensive linemen, and played a key role in the team's defense over the next decade at linebacker. Often used to call the defensive signals, Michaels intercepted 11 passes, including four in 1952, and also returned two of them for touchdowns. In those 10 years, Michaels helped the Browns play in five NFL Championship games, winning consecutive contests in 1954 and 1955.

== Coaching career ==
=== Oakland Raiders assistant (1962) ===
On April 3, 1962, Michaels entered the coaching ranks when he was hired by the American Football League's Oakland Raiders as the team's defensive backs coach. He would spend only one season there, with the success he enjoyed with the Browns nowhere to be found. The Raiders lost their first 13 games before winning the season finale, playing in Frank Youell Field, a temporary stadium.

=== New York Jets assistant (1963–73) ===
After the 1962 season, Michaels joined the staff of the American Football League's New York Jets as defensive line coach. He played as an emergency fill-in at linebacker in the opening game of the 1963 season versus Boston. In 1967, with the departure of J.D. Donaldson, Michaels's responsibility shifted to linebackers and the secondary. He also became the "unofficial" defensive coordinator, creating the team's defensive game plans. The Jets defeated the Baltimore Colts (and his brother, Colts kicker Lou Michaels) in Super Bowl III.

In the years that immediately followed, Michaels seemingly emerged as the heir apparent to replace Jets head coach Weeb Ewbank, following the departure of fellow assistant Clive Rush.

=== Philadelphia Eagles assistant (1973–75) ===
However, Michaels' career fortunes changed dramatically on February 1, 1973, when Ewbank hired his son-in-law, Charley Winner, and designated him his successor after the upcoming season. Michaels immediately resigned and within two weeks later had signed to become the defensive coordinator of the Philadelphia Eagles, working under former Browns' teammate Mike McCormack.

Three mediocre seasons in Philadelphia followed, with McCormack and his staff dismissed at the end of the 1975 NFL season. After Winner was also dismissed as Jets head coach, Michaels returned to New York, again resuming his role as the main coach on defense under new head coach Lou Holtz.

=== New York Jets assistant (1976) ===
Holtz's one season at the professional level turned out to be a disaster, leading him to resign in the days prior to the last game of the season. On January 4, 1977, Michaels was officially selected as head coach of the Jets, beginning six seasons of wildly contrasting results.

=== New York Jets head coach (1977–83) ===
Michaels' first season saw the team win only three of 14 games, but over the next two years, the Jets managed to split their 16 contests in each year. The five-game improvement in 1978 was good enough to win Michaels the AFC Coach of the Year award.

The 1979 season was another 8–8 campaign that was marred by a quarterback controversy. Starter Richard Todd was demoted and new starter Matt Robinson was named for the season opener against the Cleveland Browns. But days before the game, Robinson injured his throwing-hand thumb during horseplay with Joe Klecko. Robinson tried to hide the injury, but was forced to reveal it the night before the game. The thumb was treated and the Jets took a 22–19 lead in the final quarter. Robinson had the tape on his injured thumb removed thinking the game was over, but Brian Sipe led a game-tying Browns drive, and in overtime Robinson, unable to grip the ball, threw a sloppy pass for Wesley Walker that was intercepted and turned into a Browns game-winning field goal. Michaels never used Robinson again even after Todd got injured. Another incident during 1979 illustrated the fragile dynamic of Michaels' tenure with the Jets. On November 26 when the Jets were crushed 30–7 by the Seattle Seahawks in the Kingdome; one Seahawks score was set up as cornerback Cornell Webster blocked a Chuck Ramsey punt which followed a Jets turnover on a mishandled snap. Following the game Michaels called out Ramsey in front of teammates by snarling, "I can fart farther than you can kick!"

A rough 4–12 season in 1980 was followed by an 0–3 start in 1981. Following a 31–30 loss to the Bengals an ugly Monday press conference occurred. Michaels angrily confronted New York Daily News writer Bill Verigan an hour before the press conference, then in the ensuing conference Michaels' eyes were described as "glazed" and his speech "slurred." Despite this the Jets surged to win ten games, securing their first playoff berth since 1969, also their first berth since joining the NFL in 1970. The year's success ended with a 31–27 defeat to the Buffalo Bills in the AFC wild card game. During the strike-shortened 1982 NFL season, the Jets went 6–3, then pounded the Cincinnati Bengals 44–17 in the first round of that year's expanded playoff system. Traveling to face the top-seeded Los Angeles Raiders the following week, the Jets pulled off a 17–14 upset. Michaels dealt with a phone call at halftime that upset him to the point where he launched into a verbal attack onto who he thought did it: Raiders managing general partner Al Davis, although this was proven false. One game away from Super Bowl XVII, the Jets arrived at Miami's Orange Bowl on January 23, 1983, to find that the field had not been covered, despite a heavy rainstorm. The subsequent AFC Championship game became known as the "Mud Bowl", where the Jets lost 14–0 to the Miami Dolphins.

On February 10, 1983, 17 days after the loss to the Dolphins, Michaels resigned, citing a need for a break from football. He had been under severe emotional strain during the last weeks of the 1982 regular season, taking time each week to visit his terminally ill mother in Pennsylvania. Reportedly, Jets owner Leon Hess and president Jim Kensil pressured Michaels into resigning.

=== New Jersey Generals, USFL (1984–85) ===
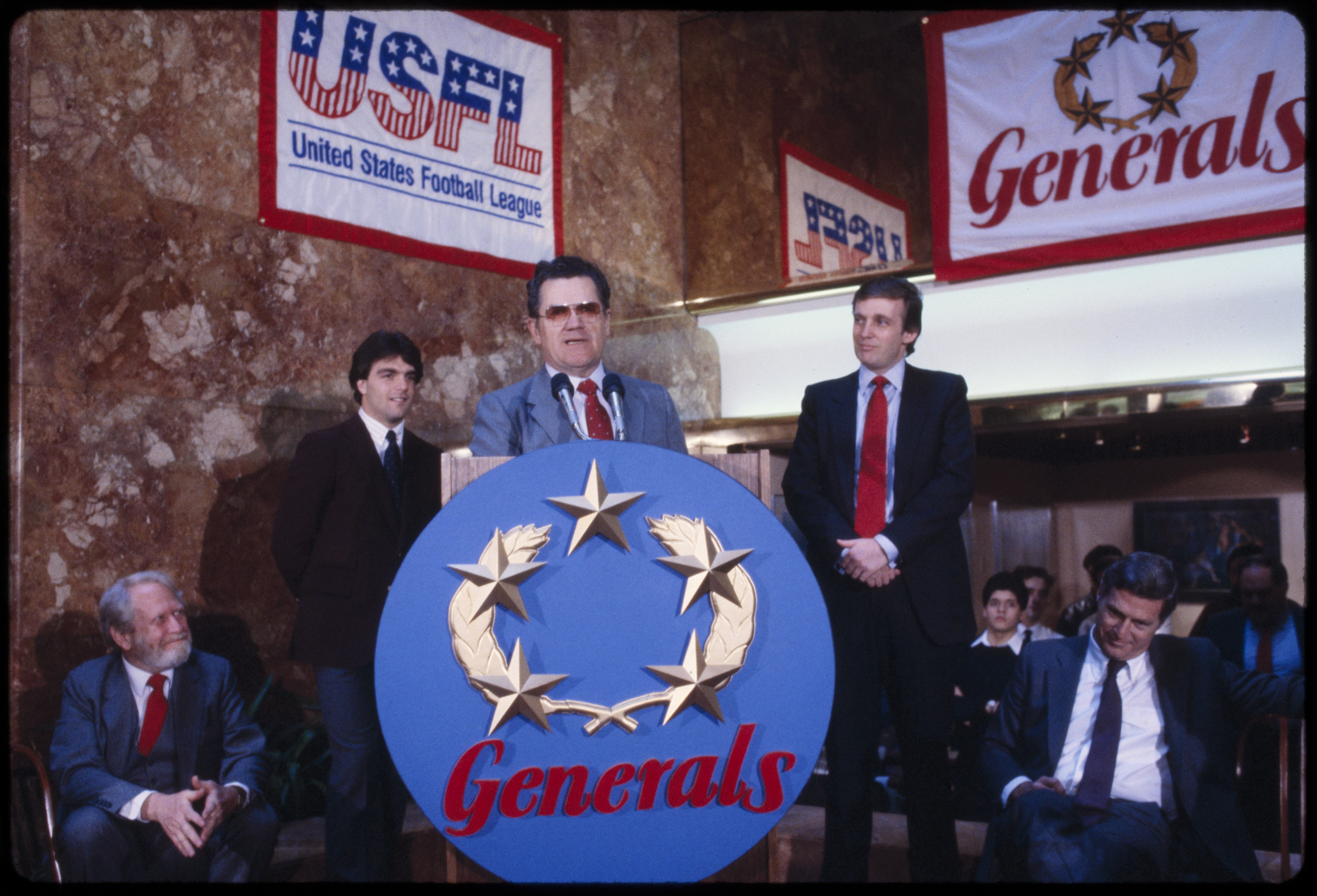
Michaels at a 1985 New Jersey Generals press conference in Trump Tower

Michaels would then coach the New Jersey Generals in the USFL for two years beginning in 1984. One month after the conclusion of the 1985 season, Michaels and his staff were let go by Generals' team owner Donald Trump after the team merged with the Houston Gamblers. The Generals never played another game, however, as the 1986 season was cancelled and the league folded after winning a mere $1 verdict in its antitrust lawsuit against the NFL.

=== ILAF (International League of American Football) ===
On December 21, 1989, Michaels was hired as coach of the Helsinki franchise in the new International League of American Football, a developmental league and the forerunner of the now defunct World League of American Football and NFL Europe.

== Head coaching record ==
=== NFL ===
Team	Year	Regular season					Postseason			
Team	Year	Won	Lost	Ties	Win %	Finish	Won	Lost	Win %	Result
NYJ	1977	3	11	0	.214	5th in AFC East	-	-	-	
NYJ	1978	8	8	0	.500	3rd in AFC East	-	-	-	
NYJ	1979	8	8	0	.500	3rd in AFC East	-	-	-	
NYJ	1980	4	12	0	.250	5th in AFC East	-	-	-	
NYJ	1981	10	5	1	.656	2nd in AFC East	0	1	.000	Lost to the Buffalo Bills in AFC Wild-Card Game
NYJ	1982 *	6	3	0	.667	6th in AFC Division	2	1	.667	Lost to the Miami Dolphins in AFC Championship Game
Total		39	47	1	.454		2	2	.500	

- Note: The 1982 season was reduced to 9 games due to an 8-week player strike.

=== USFL ===
Team	Year	Regular season					Postseason			
Team	Year	Won	Lost	Ties	Win %	Finish	Won	Lost	Win %	Result
NJG	1984	14	4	0	.778	2nd in Atlantic Division	0	1	.000	Lost to the Philadelphia Stars in Eastern Conference Semifinals
NJG	1985	11	7	0	.611	2nd in Eastern Conference	0	1	.000	Lost to the Baltimore Stars in Eastern Conference Quarterfinals
Total		25	11	0	.694		0	2	.000	

== See also ==
- List of American Football League players
