= Wesley Walker =

American football player (born 1955)

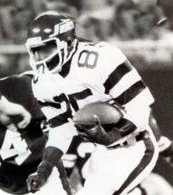
- Walker with the New York Jets in 1981

No. 85
- Position: Wide receiver

Personal information
- Born: May 26, 1955 (age 71); San Bernardino, California, U.S.
- Listed height: 6 ft 0 in (1.83 m)
- Listed weight: 179 lb (81 kg)

Career information
- High school: Carson (Carson, California)
- College: California (1973–1976)
- NFL draft: 1977: 2nd round, 33rd overall pick

Career history
- New York Jets (1977–1989)

Awards and highlights
- First-team All-Pro (1978); 2× Pro Bowl (1978, 1982); NFL receiving yards leader (1978); PFWA All-Rookie Team (1977); New York Jets Ring of Honor; Second-team All-Pac-8 (1975, 1976)

Career NFL statistics
- Receptions: 438
- Receiving yards: 8,306
- Receiving touchdowns: 71
- Stats at Pro Football Reference

Wesley Darcel Walker (born May 26, 1955) is an American former professional football player who was a wide receiver for the New York Jets of the National Football League (NFL) from 1977 to 1989.

== Early life ==
Walker graduated from Carson High School in Carson, California, where he set many receiving and return records, and was an All-American for the California Golden Bears, catching 86 passes for 2,206 yards and 22 touchdowns over the course of four seasons, an average of 25.7 yards per catch. Walker also participated on the California Golden Bears track and field team, anchoring their 4 × 100 m relay team to a 2nd-place finish at the 1975 NCAA Division I Outdoor Track and Field Championships.

== Professional career ==
Connie Carberg, the first female scout in NFL history was credited with helping the Jets in their selection of Walker 33rd overall in the second round of the 1977 NFL draft. Walker had a limited start in his first weeks as a starter, catching six total passes in his first three games, although the October 2 game against the New England Patriots saw him catch his first touchdown pass from Richard Todd. He had his biggest game against the Oakland Raiders on October 23 with a game of 178 yards on four catches with a touchdown. In total of 14 games, he caught 35 passes for 740 yards with three touchdowns. The following season saw him break out. On opening day against Miami, he caught two touchdown passes while finishing with 108 yards on four receptions in a 33–20 victory. Six weeks later, he caught five passes for 154 yards with a touchdown in his best game in yardage for the year, which saw two more 100-yard games in a full slate of sixteen games. He caught 48 passes for 1,169 yards (averaging 24.3 yards per reception) with eight touchdowns. For his efforts, he was named to the Pro Bowl. He was the first Jet to lead the league in receiving yards since Don Maynard did so in the American Football League era and is currently the last Jet to lead the category as of 2023.

Walker played in just nine games in 1979, catching 23 passes for 569 yards with five touchdowns. In the ninth week against Houston, he caught four passes for 111 yards, but he suffered a knee injury on a tackle by safety Mike Reinfeldt that knocked him out for the game and ultimately the rest of the year. Walker sprained his neck in the preseason before managing to get back in time for opening day in 1980. He then missed six games with a deep thigh bruise in the middle of the season. In total, he caught 18 passes for 376 yards with one touchdown.

Walker played in 13 games for the 1981 season, catching 47 passes for 770 yards with nine touchdowns. In his first playoff game as a receiver, facing the Buffalo Bills, he caught three passes for 24 yards in the 31–27 loss. The strike-shortened 1982 season saw Walker lose no steps in nine games. He caught 39 passes for 620 yards with six touchdowns while receiving a Pro Bowl selection. He had his first three-touchdown game on December 6 in a 28–13 win over Detroit. In the Wild Card round against the Cincinnati Bengals, he caught eight passes for 145 yards for a touchdown in the 44–17 victory. He continued his ways in the Divisional Round versus Los Angeles, catching seven passes for 169 yards and a touchdown to opening the scoring in a 17–14 victory. It would not extend to the AFC Championship against Miami, where he caught one pass for zero yards in a 14–0 loss.

His best receiving season came in 1983, when he had 61 receptions to go with 868 yards and eight touchdowns in a full season of play. He played in twelve games in 1984 and caught 41 passes for 623 yards with seven touchdowns. He played the same number of games the following year and caught 34 passes for 725 yards with five touchdowns while the Jets made the playoffs. He caught four passes for 54 yards in a 26–14 loss to New England. In 1986, he appeared in each game and caught 49 passes for 1,016 yards with a career-high twelve touchdowns. Four of them (a career best in a game for Walker) came in the September 21 game against Miami, which included both the game-tying and game-winning touchdown from Ken O'Brien in a wild 51–45 victory. The Jets made the playoffs for the fourth and final time with Walker on the roster. In the Wild Card game versus Kansas City, he caught two passes for 45 yards in the 35–15 victory. In the Divisional Round game against Cleveland, he caught the first score of the game from Pat Ryan while catching one other pass in a game that the Jets lost 23–20 in double overtime.

Walker played in just five games in 1987, which was marred by a strike that saw Walker and other players not cross the picket lines while replacement players were used for three weeks. He separated his shoulder early against the Seattle Seahawks and ended up missing the rest of the season, having caught nine whole passes for 190 yards and one touchdown. He played in just six games of the 1988 season due to ankle issues, catching eight passes for 89 yards, with his last catch being against Atlanta on November 26. On April 12, 1990, the Jets cut Walker, and he retired not long after that.

He was noted for his great speed, averaging over 20 yards per reception over many seasons (his career average was 19 yards per reception). Legally blind in his left eye, Walker eventually retired as an all-time leader for the Jets. He had caught 438 passes for 8,306 yards and 71 touchdowns, which was second all-time to Don Maynard in each category in Jets history (he has stayed 2nd in receptions and touchdowns as of 2024). On October 8, 2012, he was inducted into the Jets Ring of Honor alongside teammate Mark Gastineau.

== NFL career statistics ==
Legend
	Led the league
**Bold**	Career high

=== Regular season ===
Year	Team	Games		Receiving				
Year	Team	GP	GS	Rec	Yds	Avg	Lng	TD
1977	NYJ	14	14	35	740	21.1	87	3
1978	NYJ	**16**	**16**	48	**1,169**	24.4	77	8
1979	NYJ	9	9	23	569	**24.7**	71	5
1980	NYJ	10	7	18	376	20.9	47	1
1981	NYJ	13	13	47	770	16.4	49	9
1982	NYJ	9	9	39	620	15.9	56	6
1983	NYJ	**16**	**16**	**61**	868	14.2	64	7
1984	NYJ	12	10	41	623	15.2	44	7
1985	NYJ	12	10	34	725	21.3	**96**	5
1986	NYJ	**16**	8	49	1,016	20.7	83	**12**
1987	NYJ	5	4	9	190	21.1	59	1
1988	NYJ	**16**	10	26	551	21.2	50	7
1989	NYJ	6	3	8	89	11.1	31	0
		154	129	438	8,306	19.0	96	71

=== Playoffs ===
Year	Team	Games		Receiving				
Year	Team	GP	GS	Rec	Yds	Avg	Lng	TD
1981	NYJ	1	1	3	24	8.0	11	0
1982	NYJ	**3**	**3**	**16**	**314**	19.6	**49**	**2**
1985	NYJ	1	1	4	54	13.5	24	0
1986	NYJ	2	0	4	94	**23.5**	42	1
		7	5	27	486	18.0	49	3

== Personal life ==
Walker is now a retired physical education teacher at Park View Elementary School in Kings Park, New York, and an occasional sports radio show commentator. He has two sons and a daughter. His older son, John, was a 3x All-American lacrosse player at The United States Military Academy at West Point. His younger son, Austin, played lacrosse at Johns Hopkins University. He is also the godfather of Alexandra Florant, the daughter of the track and field star Carl Florant.

Like many former NFL players, Walker has a variety of ailments as a direct result from his playing days, which he detailed in a revealing 2016 interview with Long Island Pulse Magazine. He graduated from Mercy College.

Walker was inducted into the Suffolk Sports Hall of Fame on Long Island in the Football Category with the Class of 2000.
