= Marty Wetzel =

American football player (born 1958)

No. 58
- Position: Linebacker

Personal information
- Born: January 29, 1958 (age 68); New Orleans, Louisiana, U.S.
- Listed height: 6 ft 3 in (1.91 m)
- Listed weight: 235 lb (107 kg)

Career information
- High school: East Jefferson (Metairie, Louisiana)
- College: Tulane
- NFL draft: 1981: 10th round, 251st overall pick

Career history
- New York Jets (1981)
- Stats at Pro Football Reference

William Martin Wetzel (born January 29, 1958) is an American former professional football linebacker in the National Football League (NFL) who played for the New York Jets. He played college football at Tulane University.
