= Kenny Lewis (American football) =

American football player (born 1957)

No. 24, 20, 22
- Position: Running back

Personal information
- Born: October 2, 1957 (age 69); Danville, Virginia, U.S.
- Listed height: 6 ft 0 in (1.83 m)
- Listed weight: 190 lb (86 kg)

Career information
- High school: George Washington (Danville)
- College: Virginia Tech
- NFL draft: 1980: 5th round, 125th overall pick

Career history
- Oakland Raiders (1980)*; New York Jets (1980–1983)
- * Offseason or practice squad member only

Career NFL statistics
- Rushing yards: 43
- Rushing average: 3.9
- Receptions: 9
- Receiving yards: 82
- Stats at Pro Football Reference

Kenneth Lewis (born October 2, 1957) is an American former professional football player who was a running back in the National Football League (NFL) for the New York Jets. He played college football for the Virginia Tech Hokies where he earned his undergraduate degree.

== Biography ==
After leaving the National Football League, Mr. Lewis returned to his high school alma mater, George Washington High School, to coach track and football and teach physical education. While there, he completed his master's degree in public school administration from the University of Virginia in 1987. He later served as assistant principal at Gibson Middle School, Westwood Middle School, and George Washington High School. He then became a co-principal at George Washington High School then moved to Langston Focus School as principal. He also served as Director of Alternative Education and Principal at Gibson Middle School. In 2013, he became Director of Student Intervention at the administrative level of Danville Public Schools. He retired from Danville Public Schools in June 2014. He has also served as principal of Abundant Life Christian Academy.

Lewis founded the Danville Church-Based Tutorial Program (DCBTP) in 1996. He attended a conference led by Dr. Donald Hunter of the Louisiana State Department of Education who is also an ordained Baptist minister. Mr. Lewis learned about how Dr. Hunter had implemented a community-based tutorial program in Louisiana and wanted to do the same for Danville, Va. Lewis received help from Danville Public Schools Superintendent, Dr. Andy Overstreet, and Mayor Rubie Archie. Dr. Hunter was flown to Danville and DCBTP was birthed in six founding churches.

In 2021, the DCCTP program had grown to 42 church and community sites and served over 500 students. The name changed in 2021 to Danville Church and Community Tutorial Center.

== Personal life ==
Lewis, the youngest of five children, lost his mother at the age of 1 1/2 and his father when he was 17 years old. He married his wife, Theresa, in 1984.

Lewis now lives back in his hometown of Danville, Virginia.
