= Jim Luscinski =

American football player (born 1958)

No. 71
- Positions: Tackle, guard

Personal information
- Born: December 16, 1958 (age 67); Arlington, Massachusetts, U.S.
- Listed height: 6 ft 5 in (1.96 m)
- Listed weight: 275 lb (125 kg)

Career information
- High school: Hanover (Hanover, Massachusetts)
- College: Norwich
- NFL draft: 1980: undrafted

Career history
- New York Jets (1980)*; Philadelphia Eagles (1981)*; New York Jets (1982)
- * Offseason or practice squad member only

Career NFL statistics
- Games played: 6
- Stats at Pro Football Reference

Jim Luscinski (born December 16, 1958) is an American former professional football player who was a tackle and guard for the New York Jets of the National Football League (NFL) in 1982. He played college football for the Norwich Cadets.
