= Nick Bruckner =

American football player (born 1961)

No. 86, 83, 22
- Position: Wide receiver

Personal information
- Born: May 19, 1961 (age 65); Queens, New York City, New York, U.S.
- Listed height: 5 ft 11 in (1.80 m)
- Listed weight: 185 lb (84 kg)

Career information
- High school: Selden (NY) Newfield
- College: Syracuse
- NFL draft: 1983: undrafted

Career history
- New York Jets (1983–1985)

Career NFL statistics
- Receptions: 1
- Receiving yards: 11
- Return yards: 42
- Stats at Pro Football Reference

Nick Bruckner (born May 19, 1961) is an American former professional football player who was a wide receiver for the New York Jets of the National Football League (NFL) from 1983 to 1985. He played college football for the Syracuse Orange.
