= Tom Coombs =

American football player (born 1959)

No. 88
- Position: Tight end

Personal information
- Born: May 31, 1959 (age 67); Eureka, California, U.S.
- Listed height: 6 ft 3 in (1.91 m)
- Listed weight: 236 lb (107 kg)

Career information
- High school: Olympia (WA) Capital
- College: Puget Sound; Idaho State
- NFL draft: 1982: 7th round, 191st overall pick

Career history
- New York Jets (1982–1983); Green Bay Packers (1985)*
- * Offseason or practice squad member only

Career NFL statistics
- Receptions: 1
- Receiving yards: 1
- Stats at Pro Football Reference

Thomas Barton Coombs (born May 31, 1959) is an American former professional football player who was a tight end for the New York Jets of the National Football League (NFL) from 1982 to 1983. He played college football for the Puget Sound Loggers and Idaho State Bengals.
