= Kenny Neil =

American football player (born 1959)

No. 77, 75
- Position: Defensive lineman

Personal information
- Born: January 8, 1959 (age 67); Cincinnati, Ohio, U.S.
- Listed height: 6 ft 4 in (1.93 m)
- Listed weight: 244 lb (111 kg)

Career information
- High school: Aiken
- College: Iowa State
- NFL draft: 1981: 7th round, 169th overall pick

Career history
- New York Jets (1981–1983); Houston Oilers (1987)

Career NFL statistics
- Games Played: 42
- Sacks: 10
- Stats at Pro Football Reference

Kenny Neil (born January 8, 1959) is an American former professional football player, who played defensive lineman for the New York Jets and Houston Oilers.
