= Reggie McElroy =

American football player (born 1960)

No. 68, 77, 70, 60
- Position: Offensive tackle

Personal information
- Born: March 4, 1960 (age 66); Beaumont, Texas, U.S.
- Listed height: 6 ft 6 in (1.98 m)
- Listed weight: 290 lb (132 kg)

Career information
- High school: Beaumont Charlton-Pollard (TX)
- College: West Texas A&M
- NFL draft: 1982: 2nd round, 51st overall pick

Career history
- New York Jets (1982–1989); Los Angeles Raiders (1991–1992); Kansas City Chiefs (1993); Minnesota Vikings (1994); Denver Broncos (1995–1996)

Career NFL statistics
- Games played: 165
- Games started: 90
- Fumble recoveries: 2
- Stats at Pro Football Reference

Reginald Lee McElroy (born March 4, 1960) is a former National Football League (NFL) offensive lineman from 1982 through 1996.

As of 2023, he worked as a football coach for Blue Valley Northwest High School in Overland Park, Kansas, as well as teaching PE at Shawnee Mission Horizons High School.

He is the older brother of former running back and kick returner, Leeland McElroy, who played for the Arizona Cardinals.
