= Davlin Mullen =

American football player (born 1960)

No. 20
- Position: Defensive back

Personal information
- Born: February 17, 1960 (age 66); McKeesport, Pennsylvania, U.S.
- Listed height: 6 ft 1 in (1.85 m)
- Listed weight: 175 lb (79 kg)

Career information
- High school: Clairton (PA)
- College: Western Kentucky
- NFL draft: 1983: 8th round, 217th overall pick

Career history
- New York Jets (1983–1986)

Career NFL statistics
- Interceptions: 4
- Stats at Pro Football Reference

Davlin Mullen (born February 17, 1960) is an American former professional football player who was a defensive back for the New York Jets of the National Football League (NFL) from 1983 to 1986. He played college football for the Western Kentucky Hilltoppers.
