= Rusty Guilbeau =

American football player (born 1958)

No. 94
- Position: Linebacker

Personal information
- Born: November 20, 1958 (age 67); Opelousas, Louisiana, U.S.
- Listed height: 6 ft 4 in (1.93 m)
- Listed weight: 242 lb (110 kg)

Career information
- High school: Sunset (LA)
- College: McNeese State
- NFL draft: 1982: 3rd round, 73rd overall pick

Career history
- St. Louis Cardinals (1982)*; New York Jets (1982–1986); Cleveland Browns (1987)
- * Offseason or practice squad member only

Career NFL statistics
- Sacks: 3
- Fumble recoveries: 1
- Stats at Pro Football Reference

David Ruston Guilbeau (born November 20, 1958) is an American former professional football player who was a linebacker in the National Football League (NFL). He played for the New York Jets from 1982 to 1986 and for the Cleveland Browns in 1987.
