= Joe Pellegrini (offensive lineman) =

American football player (born 1957)

No. 62, 64
- Positions: Guard, center

Personal information
- Born: April 8, 1957 (age 69); Boston, Massachusetts, U.S.
- Listed height: 6 ft 4 in (1.93 m)
- Listed weight: 265 lb (120 kg)

Career information
- High school: Archbishop Williams (Braintree, Massachusetts)
- College: Harvard
- NFL draft: 1981: undrafted

Career history
- New York Jets (1981–1983); Atlanta Falcons (1984–1986)

Career NFL statistics
- Games played: 53
- Games started: 15
- Fumble recoveries: 1
- Stats at Pro Football Reference

Joseph Anthony Pellegrini (born April 8, 1957) is an American former professional football player who was an offensive lineman for five seasons with the New York Jets and the Atlanta Falcons of the National Football League (NFL). He played college football for the Harvard Crimson.

Pellegrini hails from Hingham, Massachusetts. He attended Archbishop Williams High School in Braintree, Massachusetts, participating in football and track and field throwing events, though he admits he was not a great athlete. Pellegrini graduated as valedictorian and enrolled at Harvard University.

At Harvard, Pellegrini played for the Crimson football team while also doing track and field. He skipped his senior season in an attempt to qualify for the 1980 Summer Olympics as a discus thrower, training in West Germany, although he was ultimately unable to compete due to the boycott. Pellegrini tried returning to the football team in 1981, but was not invited to training camp by head coach Joe Restic. He instead earned his degree in geology.

In 1981, Pellegrini signed a free agent deal with the New York Jets after a tryout, though he was placed on injured reserve that season due to a back injury. He earned a first-year salary of $25,000.

== Personal life ==
Pellegrini's younger brother, Dave, became an NCAA champion in the weight throw at Princeton. The two often competed against each other in Ivy League throwing events.
