= Ben Rudolph =

American football player (born 1957)

No. 76
- Positions: Defensive tackle, defensive end

Personal information
- Born: August 29, 1957 (age 69); Evergreen, Alabama, U.S.
- Listed height: 6 ft 5 in (1.96 m)
- Listed weight: 271 lb (123 kg)

Career information
- High school: Fairhope (AL)
- College: Long Beach State
- NFL draft: 1981: 3rd round, 60th overall pick

Career history
- New York Jets (1981–1985); Los Angeles Express (1985); New York Jets (1986); Dallas Cowboys (1987)*
- * Offseason or practice squad member only

Career NFL statistics
- Sacks: 10.5
- Fumble recoveries: 2
- Stats at Pro Football Reference

Benjamin Rudolph (born August 29, 1957) is an American former professional football player who was a defensive tackle/defensive end in the National Football League (NFL). Rudolph was selected in the third round (60th overall pick) of the 1981 NFL draft by the New York Jets out of Long Beach State University.
