= Jesse Johnson (American football) =

American football player (born 1957)

No. 27
- Position: Cornerback

Personal information
- Born: August 23, 1957 (age 69); Fort Collins, Colorado, U.S.
- Listed height: 6 ft 3 in (1.91 m)
- Listed weight: 185 lb (84 kg)

Career information
- High school: East (Cheyenne, Wyoming)
- College: Colorado
- NFL draft: 1980: 4th round, 95th overall pick

Career history
- New York Jets (1980–1983); New Jersey Generals (1984); Pittsburgh Maulers (1984)

Career NFL statistics
- Fumble recoveries: 1
- Stats at Pro Football Reference

Jesse Johnson (born August 23, 1957) is an American former professional football player. Johnson played college football at the University of Colorado. He was selected 95th overall by the New York Jets in the fourth round of the 1980 NFL Draft. He played four seasons for the Jets, splitting his time between cornerback and safety.

After playing football, Johnson spent nearly 30 years working for Altria.

As of 2023, he splits his time between Midlothian, Virginia and Naples, Florida.
