= Stan Waldemore =

American football player (born 1955)

No. 70
- Positions: Guard, tackle

Personal information
- Born: February 20, 1955 (age 71); Newark, New Jersey, U.S.
- Listed height: 6 ft 4 in (1.93 m)
- Listed weight: 263 lb (119 kg)

Career information
- High school: Essex Catholic (NJ)
- College: Nebraska
- NFL draft: 1978: 3rd round, 70th overall pick

Career history
- New York Jets (1978–1984)

Career NFL statistics
- Games played: 79
- Games started: 38
- Fumble recoveries: 2
- Stats at Pro Football Reference

Stan Waldemore (born February 20, 1955) is an American former professional football player who was an offensive tackle and offensive guard for the New York Jets of the National Football League (NFL) from 1978 to 1984. He played college football for the Nebraska Cornhuskers. Waldemore played 62 games in his NFL career.
