= Mike Augustyniak =

American football player (born 1956)

No. 35
- Position: Fullback

Personal information
- Born: July 17, 1956 (age 70); Fort Wayne, Indiana, U.S.
- Listed height: 6 ft 0 in (1.83 m)
- Listed weight: 225 lb (102 kg)

Career information
- High school: Leo (Leo-Cedarville, Indiana)
- College: Purdue
- NFL draft: 1980: undrafted

Career history
- New Orleans Saints (1980)*; New York Jets (1981–1983)
- * Offseason or practice squad member only

Career NFL statistics
- Rushing yards: 567
- Rushing average: 3.7
- Rushing touchdowns: 7
- Stats at Pro Football Reference

Michael Eugene Augustyniak (born July 17, 1956) is an American former professional football player who was a running back for the New York Jets of the National Football League (NFL). He played college football for the Purdue Boilermakers, where he was member of the 1978 Peach Bowl Champions and the 1979 Bluebonnet Bowl Champions. While he was undrafted out of college; he ultimately signed with the New York Jets, reaching the 1982 AFC Title Game (aka The "Mud Bowl")

He was inducted into the Indiana Football Hall of Fame in October, 2017.
