= Bobby Jackson (cornerback) =

American football player (born 1956)

No. 40
- Position: Cornerback

Personal information
- Born: December 23, 1956 (age 69); Albany, Georgia, U.S.
- Listed height: 5 ft 9 in (1.75 m)
- Listed weight: 178 lb (81 kg)

Career information
- High school: Albany
- College: Florida State
- NFL draft: 1978: 6th round, 140th overall pick

Career history
- New York Jets (1978–1985)

Awards and highlights
- PFWA All-Rookie Team (1978)

Career NFL statistics
- Interceptions: 21
- Fumble recoveries: 3
- Touchdowns: 3
- Stats at Pro Football Reference

Robert Charles Jackson (born December 23, 1956) is an American former professional football player who was a cornerback for the New York Jets of the National Football League (NFL). He retired with 21 career interceptions and 3 fumble recoveries.

== College ==
Jackson started at Florida State University and in 1993 was inducted into the FSU Hall of Fame.

Jackson once held the all time interception record at FSU, since broken by Terrell Buckley. Jackson also held the single game-punt return average of 45.3 yard per return (minimum three returns) -- a record since broken by Jet star Leon Washington.

== Professional career ==
His professional career began when he was selected 140th overall in the sixth round of the National Football League draft of 1978. He went on to start all 16 games at cornerback his rookie year. He also tied for the team lead with 5 interceptions and was named to the “AFC All-Rookie Team” as a starter.
