= John Woodring =

American football player (born 1959)

No. 57
- Position: Linebacker

Personal information
- Born: April 4, 1959 (age 67); Philadelphia, Pennsylvania, U.S.
- Listed height: 6 ft 2 in (1.88 m)
- Listed weight: 232 lb (105 kg)

Career information
- High school: Springfield (Springfield, Pennsylvania)
- College: Brown
- NFL draft: 1981: 6th round, 142nd overall pick

Career history
- New York Jets (1981–1985)

Career NFL statistics
- Sacks: 1
- Fumble recoveries: 7
- Stats at Pro Football Reference

John Woodring (born April 4, 1959) is an American former professional football player who was a linebacker in the National Football League (NFL). He played for the New York Jets from 1981 to 1985. He played college football for the Brown Bears.
