= Ken Schroy =

American football player (born 1952)

No. 48
- Position: Safety

Personal information
- Born: September 22, 1952 (age 74); Valley Forge, Pennsylvania, U.S.
- Listed height: 6 ft 2 in (1.88 m)
- Listed weight: 198 lb (90 kg)

Career information
- College: Maryland
- NFL draft: 1975: 10th round, 248th overall pick

Career history
- New York Jets (1977–1984)

Career NFL statistics
- Interceptions: 16
- Fumble recoveries: 11
- Defensive touchdowns: 1
- Stats at Pro Football Reference

Kenneth Michael Schroy (born September 22, 1952) is an American former professional football player who was a safety for eight seasons in the National Football League (NFL) with the New York Jets.

Schroy played high school football at Quakertown Community Senior High School in Quakertown, scoring 27 touchdowns and rushing for 2,399 yards. He is currently the only player in Quakertown High School history to have his number (46) retired.

Schroy played college football for the Maryland Terrapins and was selected in 1975 by the Philadelphia Eagles (10th round, 248 overall), but never played for the team.
