= Kirk Springs =

American football player (born 1958)

No. 45, 21
- Position: Safety

Personal information
- Born: August 16, 1958 (age 68); Cincinnati, Ohio, U.S.
- Listed height: 6 ft 0 in (1.83 m)
- Listed weight: 192 lb (87 kg)

Career information
- High school: Woodward (Cincinnati)
- College: Miami (OH)
- NFL draft: 1980: undrafted

Career history
- Seattle Seahawks (1980)*; New York Jets (1981–1985); Indianapolis Colts (1987)*
- * Offseason or practice squad member only

Career NFL statistics
- Interceptions: 4
- Fumble recoveries: 7
- Sacks: 0.5
- Stats at Pro Football Reference

Kirk Edward Springs (born August 16, 1958) is an American former professional football player who was a safety for five seasons with the New York Jets of the National Football League (NFL). He played college football for the Miami RedHawks.

Springs' most memorable NFL play came in a Monday Night Football contest at New Orleans on November 21, 1983, when he returned a Russell Erxleben punt 76 yards for a touchdown with less than four minutes remaining to lift the Jets to a 31–28 victory over the New Orleans Saints. The Jets scored 17 unanswered points in the fourth quarter to deny the Saints their first MNF victory. The loss eventually cost the Saints their first winning season and playoff berth, as New Orleans finished 8–8 under Bum Phillips.
