= New York Jets all-time roster (A–K) =

1,553 players have appeared in at least one regular season or postseason game in the National Football League (NFL) or American Football League (AFL) for the New York Jets franchise since 1960. This list includes those whose last names fall between "A" and "K". For the rest of the players, see New York Jets all-time roster (L–Z). This list is accurate through the end of the 2025 NFL season.

== A ==
- Israel Abanikanda
- Oday Aboushi
- Donnie Abraham
- John Abraham
- Sid Abramowitz
- Ray Abruzzese
- Mike Adamle
- Davante Adams
- Jamal Adams
- Josh Adams
- Phillip Adams
- Tony Adams
- Margene Adkins
- Louie Aguiar
- Freedom Akinmoladun
- Dan Alexander
- David Alexander
- Gerald Alexander
- Kwon Alexander
- Rogers Alexander
- Darnell Alford
- Lynwood Alford
- Tuineau Alipate
- Don Allard
- Raul Allegre
- Antonio Allen
- Braelon Allen
- Steve Alvers
- Jace Amaro
- Dave Ames
- Matt Ammendola
- Adrian Amos
- Henry Anderson
- Richie Anderson
- Stevie Anderson
- Josh Andrews
- Jim Apple
- Gary Arthur
- B. J. Askew
- Bill Atkins
- Al Atkinson
- Jeremiah Attaochu
- Steve Atwater
- Mike Augustyniak
- Blessuan Austin
- Darrell Austin
- Ray Austin

== B ==
- Jason Babin
- Dion Bailey
- Henry Bailey
- Jim Bailey
- Zack Bailey
- Bill Bain
- Bill Baird
- Chris Baker
- Josh Baker
- Larry Baker
- Ralph Baker
- Don Baldwin
- Tom Baldwin
- Dave Ball
- Kalen Ballage
- Corey Ballentine
- Ted Banker
- Bradford Banta
- Kurt Barber
- Marion Barber, Jr.
- Jerome Barkum
- Kevan Barlow
- Tom Barndt
- Antwan Barnes
- Darian Barnes
- Ernie Barnes
- T. J. Barnes
- Zaire Barnes
- Tyler Baron
- David Barrett
- Eric Barton
- Carl Barzilauskas
- Tarell Basham
- David Bass
- Brenden Bates
- Michael Bates
- Ted Bates
- Mike Battle
- Bobby Batton
- Nick Bawden
- Brad Baxter
- Colin Baxter
- Fred Baxter
- Tom Bayless
- Sanjay Beach
- Kelvin Beachum
- Aaron Beasley
- Aubrey Beavers
- Anthony Becht
- Andrew Beck
- Mekhi Becton
- Bobby Bell
- Eddie Bell (born 1931)
- Eddie Bell (born 1946)
- Kahlil Bell
- Kevin Bell
- Le'Veon Bell
- Yeremiah Bell
- Josh Bellamy
- B. J. Bello
- Nick Bellore
- Jacob Bender
- Lou Benfatti
- Barry Bennett
- Woody Bennett
- Troy Benson
- Jarrick Bernard-Converse
- Roger Bernhardt
- Kenneth Bernich
- Braxton Berrios
- Aaron Berry
- Randy Beverly
- Verlon Biggs
- Guy Bingham
- Freddie Bishop
- Hank Bjorklund
- Korie Black
- Tarik Black
- Ronald Blair
- Jeff Blake
- Cary Blanchard
- Derrick Blaylock
- Jeff Bleamer
- Dennis Bligen
- Stan Blinka
- Harry Boatswain
- Adam Bob
- Hubert Bobo
- John Bock
- Tommy Bohanon
- Dewey Bohling
- Brooks Bollinger
- Johnny Bookman
- Dorian Boose
- John Booty
- Emerson Boozer
- Brandon Bostick
- Stephen Bowen
- David Bowens
- Braedon Bowman
- Mark Boyer
- Tim Boyle
- Ben Braden
- Kyle Brady
- Solomon Brannan
- Doug Brien
- Jowon Briggs
- Walter Briggs
- Mike Brim
- Vincent Brisby
- Bubby Brister
- Willie Brister
- Matt Brock
- Bob Brooks
- Clifford Brooks
- Terrence Brooks
- Jay Brophy
- A. B. Brown
- Arthur Brown
- Chris Brown
- Corwin Brown
- Daniel Brown
- Duane Brown
- James Brown
- Kareem Brown
- Kyron Brown
- Mark Brown
- Preston Brown
- Tre Brown
- Gordie Browne
- Charlie Browning
- Jarvis Brownlee
- Jason Brownlee
- Nick Bruckner
- Mark Brunell
- Roderick Bryant
- Don Buckey
- Terrell Buckley
- Tom Budrewicz
- Randy Bullock
- Todd Burger
- Fernanza Burgess
- James Burgess
- Joe Burke
- John Burke
- Chris Burkett
- Brandon Burks
- Deontay Burnett
- Lamont Burns
- Robert Burns
- Plaxico Burress
- Juston Burris
- Leon Burton
- Shane Burton
- Josh Bush
- Bob Butler
- Terry Butler
- Greg Buttle
- Keith Byars
- Dennis Byrd

== C ==
- Travaris Cadet
- Dave Cadigan
- Glenn Cadrez
- Lawrence Cager
- Dan Callahan
- Dennis Cambal
- Elijah Campbell
- Ibraheim Campbell
- Ken Campbell
- Khary Campbell
- Michael Campbell
- Maurice Canady
- Sheldon Canley
- Trenton Cannon
- Carl Capria
- Anders Carlson
- James Carpenter
- Rob Carpenter
- Ron Carpenter
- Steve Carpenter
- Duane Carrell
- Ahmad Carroll
- Jim Carroll
- Kern Carson
- Bruce Carter
- Dexter Carter
- Gerald Carter
- Jonathan Carter
- Michael Carter
- Michael Carter II
- Quincy Carter
- Russell Carter
- Tyrone Carter
- Chad Cascadden
- Blake Cashman
- Tony Casillas
- Rich Caster
- Sergio Castillo
- Chandler Catanzaro
- Mike Catapano
- Curtis Ceaser
- Oliver Celestin
- Pat Chaffey
- Mike Chalenski
- Irvin Charles
- Matt Chatham
- Jesse Chatman
- Tony Chickillo
- John Chirico
- Ed Chlebek
- Steve Chomyszak
- Robby Chosen
- Wayne Chrebet
- Marqui Christian
- Dick Christy
- Earl Christy
- Andre Cisco
- Ryan Clady
- Morris Claiborne
- Chuck Clark
- Dean Clark
- Jeremy Clark
- Jordan Clark
- Adrien Clarke
- Kellen Clemens
- Anthony Clement
- Chuck Clements
- Micheal Clemons
- Kyle Clifton
- David Clowney
- Randall Cobb
- Reggie Cobb
- Gene Cockrell
- Tim Cofield
- Adrian Colbert
- Keelan Cole
- Marquice Cole
- Robin Cole
- Drew Coleman
- Erik Coleman
- Kenyon Coleman
- Keo Coleman
- Marcus Coleman
- Tevin Coleman
- Xavier Coleman
- Laveranues Coles
- Trent Collins
- Willie Colon
- Tom Compton
- Tyler Conklin
- T. J. Conley
- John Conner
- J.R. Conrad
- Brett Conway
- Curtis Conway
- Brady Cook
- Dalvin Cook
- Emanuel Cook
- Ed Cooke
- Tom Coombs
- Thurlow Cooper
- Xavier Cooper
- Brandon Copeland
- Quinton Coples
- Malachi Corley
- Martin Cornelson
- Anthony Corvino
- Eric Coss
- Jerricho Cotchery
- Blake Countess
- Sam Cowart
- Bryan Cox
- Bob Crable
- Paul Crane
- Josh Cribbs
- Jeff Criswell
- Antonio Cromartie
- Ron Crosby
- Jamison Crowder
- Isaiah Crowell
- Buddy Crutchfield
- Dwayne Crutchfield
- Jeff Cumberland
- Ed Cummings
- Kenwin Cummings
- Eric Cunningham
- Jermaine Cunningham
- Vinny Curry
- Travis Curtis

== D ==
- Frank D'Agostino
- Lou D'Agostino
- Casey Dailey
- Mike D'Amato
- Paul Darby
- James Darling
- Sam Darnold
- Chy Davidson
- Ashtyn Davis
- Bob Davis
- Chris Davis
- Corey Davis
- Darrell Davis
- Demario Davis
- Isaiah Davis
- Jarrad Davis
- Jerry Davis
- Kellen Davis
- Steve Davis
- Troy Davis
- Tyrone Davis
- Andrew Davison
- Dale Dawkins
- Noah Dawkins
- Terry Day
- James Dearth
- Eric Decker
- Nick DeFelice
- Ralph DeLoach
- Sam DeLuca
- Bill Demory
- Mike Dennis
- Glenn Dennison
- Keith Denson
- Steve DeOssie
- Pierre Desir
- Mike DeVito
- Scott Dierking
- Shelton Diggs
- Cal Dixon
- Marcus Dixon
- Ronnie Dixon
- Titus Dixon
- John Dockery
- Leon Dombrowski
- Marty Domres
- Dylan Donahue
- Roger Donnahoo
- Al Dorow
- Hugh Douglas
- Marques Douglas
- Leger Douzable
- Marcus Dowtin
- Dakota Dozier
- Joel Dreessen
- Chris Dressel
- Vladimir Ducasse
- Robert Ducksworth
- Mitch Dudek
- Roger Duffy
- Mike Dukes
- Damon Dunn
- Isaiah Dunn
- K. D. Dunn
- Charlie Dupre
- Laurent Duvernay-Tardif
- Tim Dwight
- Donald Dykes
- Sean Dykes
- Andre Dyson

== E ==
- Kony Ealy
- Jim Earley
- Quinn Early
- Tony Eason
- Irv Eatman
- John Ebersole
- Brandin Echols
- A. J. Edds
- Chuma Edoga
- Braylon Edwards
- Lac Edwards
- Samuel Eguavoen
- Abram Elam
- Onzy Elam
- Donnie Elder
- Pat Elflein
- Jim Eliopulos
- John Elliott
- Jumbo Elliott
- Kenrick Ellis
- Kwame Ellis
- Roger Ellis
- Shaun Ellis
- IK Enemkpali
- Quincy Enunwa
- Jamar Enzor
- Dedrick Epps
- Phil Epps
- Boomer Esiason
- Donald Evans
- Jim Evans
- Josh Evans

== F ==
- Nuu Faaola
- Jason Fabini
- Julian Fagan
- David Fales
- Luke Falk
- Alan Faneca
- George Fant
- Chris Farasopoulos
- Matthias Farley
- Robert Farmer
- Roger Farmer
- James Farrior
- Olumuyiwa Fashanu
- Folorunso Fatukasi
- Jeff Faulkner
- Ron Faurot
- Brett Favre
- Jay Feely
- Dan Feeney
- Dick Felt
- Bill Ferguson
- D'Brickashaw Ferguson
- Jason Ferguson
- Nick Ferguson
- Dan Ficca
- Sam Ficken
- Jay Fiedler
- Jerry Fields
- Joe Fields
- Justin Fields
- Sharif Finch
- Matt Finkes
- Roger Finnie
- Anthony Firkser
- Joe Fishback
- Ryan Fitzpatrick
- Joe Flacco
- Donnie Fletcher
- Charlie Flowers
- Larry Flowers
- George Floyd
- Marcus Floyd
- Don Flynn
- Dave Foley
- Glenn Foley
- Nick Folk
- Wayne Fontes
- Matt Forte
- Derrick Foster
- Jerome Foster
- Leki Fotu
- Sid Fournet
- Bobby Fowler
- Ryan Fowler
- John Franklin-Myers
- Bubba Franks
- Elvis Franks
- Paul Frase
- Dalton Freeman
- Scott Frost
- Jim Furey

== G ==
- Derrick Gaffney
- Clark Gaines
- Harry Galbreath
- Ed Galigher
- Nick Gallery
- John Galvin
- Greg Gantt
- Mark Garalczyk
- Tony Garbarczyk
- Barry Gardner
- Sauce Gardner
- Sam Garnes
- Carl Garrett
- Mark Gastineau
- Clyde Gates
- Vernon Gholston
- Breno Giacomini
- Louie Giammona
- Jarron Gilbert
- Marcus Gilchrist
- Mardy Gilyard
- Xavier Gipson
- Mike Gisler
- Chris Glaser
- Aaron Glenn
- Howard Glenn
- Jason Glenn
- Kerry Glenn
- Chris Godfrey
- B. J. Goodson
- Mike Goodson
- Jonathan Goodwin
- Alex Gordon
- Cornell Gordon
- Dwayne Gordon
- Frank Gore
- Toby Gowin
- Scott Gragg
- Ben Graham
- Jeff Graham
- Scottie Graham
- T. J. Graham
- Reggie Grant
- Larry Grantham
- Jim Gray
- Moses Gray
- Alex Green
- Eric Green
- Howard Green
- Johnny Green
- Ray Green
- Victor Green
- Shonn Greene
- Carl Greenwood
- Ken Gregory
- Bob Gresham
- John Griffin
- Ryan Griffin
- Billy Griggs
- Jonathan Grimes
- Lee Grosscup
- Pat Gucciardo
- Dick Guesman
- Javelin Guidry
- Rusty Guilbeau
- Mark Gunn
- Obum Gwacham

== H ==
- Bryce Hager
- Jay Hagood
- Mike Haight
- Nate Hairston
- Saalim Hakim
- Breece Hall
- Bryce Hall
- Galen Hall
- John Hall
- Bobby Hamilton
- Harry Hamilton
- Rick Hamilton
- Steve Hammond
- Saquan Hampton
- Brian Hansen
- Carl Hansen
- Chad Hansen
- Jake Hanson
- Billy Hardee
- Justin Hardee
- Mecole Hardman
- Steve Harkey
- Mike Harmon
- Alan Harper
- Bruce Harper
- Michael Harper
- Rick Harrell
- David Harris
- Jim Harris
- Marcell Harris
- Damon Harrison
- Jonotthan Harrison
- Pete Hart
- Ben Hartsock
- Percy Harvin
- Carlton Haselrig
- Clint Haslerig
- Jim Haslett
- J.T. Hassell
- James Hasty
- Matthew Hatchette
- Chris Hayes
- Melvin Hayes
- Raymond Hayes
- Tae Hayes
- Windrell Hayes
- Abner Haynes
- Jo Jo Heath
- Bruce Hector
- Johnny Hector
- Gene Heeter
- De'Angelo Henderson
- Erin Henderson
- Jamie Henderson
- Jerome Henderson
- Karl Henke
- John Hennessy
- Thomas Hennessy
- Mike Hennigan
- Khalil Herbert
- Nate Herbig
- Dave Herman
- Grant Hermanns
- Chris Herndon
- Don Herndon
- Neville Hewitt
- Cliff Hicks
- Eric Hicks
- W. K. Hicks
- Jason Hill
- Stephen Hill
- Winston Hill
- Lex Hilliard
- Chuck Hinton
- Victor Hobson
- Reggie Hodges
- James Hodgins
- George Hoey
- Chris Hogan
- Marc Hogan
- Gus Hollomon
- T. J. Hollowell
- Scott Holman
- Rob Holmberg
- Jalyn Holmes
- Jerry Holmes
- Santonio Holmes
- Gordy Holz
- Roy Hord, Jr.
- Bobby Houston
- Cedric Houston
- Austin Howard
- Carl Howard
- Erik Howard
- Harry Howard
- Delles Howell
- Bobby Howfield
- Julian Howsare
- Mike Hudock
- Jim Hudson
- John Hudson
- Bryce Huff
- Bobby Humphery
- Tommy Humphrey
- Eddie Hunter
- Stan Hunter
- Wayne Hunter
- Paul Hynes

== I ==
- Cosmo Iacavazzi
- James Ihedigbo
- Ben Ijalana
- Chris Ivory
- Mark Iwanowski
- Larry Izzo

== J ==
- Bennett Jackson
- Bobby Jackson
- Charles Jackson
- Jazz Jackson
- Joey Jackson
- Lamar Jackson
- Dave Jacobs
- Proverb Jacobs
- Craig James
- Dick Jamieson
- Chuck Janerette
- Jaiquawn Jarrett
- Vince Jasper
- Quinton Jefferson
- Jarvis Jenkins
- Jordan Jenkins
- Kerry Jenkins
- Kris Jenkins
- Dave Jennings
- Steve Joachim
- Billy Joe
- Albert Johnson
- Anthony Johnson (born 1967)
- Anthony Johnson (born 1993)
- Chris Johnson
- Curley Johnson
- Darrien Johnson
- Jermaine Johnson II
- Jesse Johnson
- Johnny Johnson
- Josh Johnson
- Ken Johnson
- Keyshawn Johnson
- Leon Johnson
- Malcolm Johnson
- Mario Johnson
- Olrick Johnson
- Pepper Johnson
- Randell Johnson
- Trevor Johnson
- Troy Johnson
- Trumaine Johnson
- Ty Johnson
- Tyler Johnson
- Wesley Johnson
- Mark Johnston
- Doug Jolley
- Kingsley Jonathan
- Adrian Jones
- Bobby Jones
- Cam Jones
- Derrick Jones
- Donald Jones
- Eddie Jones
- Gary Jones
- Jermaine Jones
- Jimmie Jones
- J. J. Jones (born 1952)
- J. J. Jones (born 1992)
- Ken Jones
- Lam Jones
- Marvin Jones
- Scott Jones
- Taiwan Jones
- Thomas Jones
- LaMont Jordan
- Greg Joseph
- Vance Joseph
- Lamarcus Joyner
- Fred Julian

== K ==
- Karl Kaimer
- Ryan Kalil
- Jeremy Kapinos
- Brad Kassell
- Joe Katchik
- Norm Katnik
- Eric Kattus
- Bronson Kaufusi
- Jermaine Kearse
- Brad Keeney
- Bryson Keeton
- Dustin Keller
- Larry Keller
- Dennis Kelly
- Joe Kelly
- Pat Kelly
- Pete Kendall
- John Kenerson
- Jeremy Kerley
- Alex Kessman
- John Kidd
- Howard Kindig
- Gordon King
- Henry King
- Kobe King
- Kliff Kingsbury
- Javon Kinlaw
- Roy Kirksey
- Joe Klecko
- Rocky Klever
- Jack Klotz
- David Knight
- Leander Knight
- Zonovan Knight
- Warren Koegel
- R.J. Kors
- Ed Kovac
- Joe Kowalewski
- Al Krevis
- Tyler Kroft
- Alex Kroll
- Matt Kroul
- Zack Kuntz
- Jamie Kurisko
