= 1987 New York Jets season =

1987 football season

- Owner: Leon Hess
- General manager: Jim Kensil
- Head coach: Joe Walton
- Offensive coordinator: Rich Kotite
- Defensive coordinator: Bud Carson
- Home stadium: Giants Stadium

Results
- Record: 6–9
- Division place: 5th AFC East
- Playoffs: Did not qualify
- Pro Bowlers: WR Al Toon

The 1987 New York Jets season was the 28th season for the team and the club's 18th season in the National Football League (NFL). It began with the team trying to improve upon its 10–6 record from 1986 under head coach Joe Walton. The season was marred by a players' strike that resulted in the cancellation of all week-3 games, as well as Weeks 4 through 6 being played mostly with replacement players. The Jets finished the season with a record of 6–9. For the second time in his career, Ken O'Brien had the lowest rate of interceptions among quarterbacks. He had 8 interceptions in 393 passing attempts.

== Offseason ==
=== Draft ===
1987 New York Jets draft
Round	Pick	Player	Position	College	Notes
1	21	Roger Vick	Fullback	Texas A&M	
2	42	Alex Gordon	Linebacker	Cincinnati	
3	75	Onzy Elam	Linebacker	Tennessee State	
5	129	Kirby Jackson	Cornerback	Mississippi State	
6	161	Tracy Martin	Wide receiver	North Dakota	
7	187	Gerald Nichols	Defensive tackle	Florida State	
8	196	Eddie Hunter	Running back	Virginia Tech	
8	214	Mike Rice	Punter	Montana	
9	241	Ron McLean	Defensive tackle	Cal State Fullerton	
10	268	Sid Lewis	Cornerback	Penn State	
11	300	Kirk Timmer	Linebacker	Montana State	
12	327	Bill Ransdell	Quarterback	Kentucky	
Made roster

=== Undrafted free agents ===
1987 undrafted free agents of note
Player	Position	College
Walter Briggs	Quarterback	Montclair State
Kirk Bumett	Wide receiver	Furman
John Chirico	Running back	Columbia
Bobby Curtis	Linebacker	Savannah State
Ted Gaffney	Linebacker	Boston College
Eddie Garrett	Running back	Michigan
Joseph Giaquinto	Wide receiver	Boston College
Dennis Hochman	Kicker	Sonoma State
Mark Johnson	Safety	Western Kentucky
Chris Jones	Tackle	Delaware State
Bill Sanders	Tight end	Sacramento State
Scott Saylor	Tackle	West Vriginia
John Thomas	Tackle	Toledo
Craig Vittum	Tackle	Norwich

== Personnel ==
1987 New York Jets staff
Front office: Owner – Leon Hess; President/general manager – Jim Kensil; Head coaches: Head coach – Joe Walton; Offensive coaches: Offensive coordinator/receivers – Rich Kotite; Quarterbacks Coach Zeke Bratkowski; Running backs coach – Bobby Hammond	Defensive coaches: Defensive coordinator – Bud Carson; Defensive line coach – Ray Callahan; Linebackers coach - Dan Radakovich; Special Assist to the head coach/secondary Coach- Mike Faulkiner; Special teams coaches: Special Teams Coach - Larry Pasquale

== NFL replacement players ==
After the league decided to use replacement players during the NFLPA strike, the following team was assembled:

1987 New York Jets replacement roster
Quarterbacks: 17 David Norrie; 11 Walter Briggs; Running backs: 23 Derrick Foster RB; 29 Joe Burke FB; 33 John Chirico FB; 42 Maurice Turner FB; 45 Eddie Hunter RB; Wide receivers: 19 Bobby Riley; 80 Scott Holman; 81 Derrick Gaffney; 83 Greg Washington; 84 Michael Harper; 86 Stan Hunter; 89 John Fuocco; Tight ends: 82 Jamie Kurisko; 87 Eric Riley; 88 Tony Sweet	Offensive linemen: 61 Vinny Tuzeo T; 62 Eric Coss T; 64 Martin Cornelson C; 66 Vince Jasper T; 67 Anthony Corvino T; 69 Tom Humphrey T; 71 Pete McCartney T; 72 Ken Jones G; 76 John Thomas G; 79 Chris Brown T; Defensive linemen: 70 Tony Garbarczyk DE; 72 Tony Chickillo DE; 94 Scott Mersereau NT; 97 Adam Bethea DE; 99 Mark Gastineau DE; 74 Rodney Kinlaw NT; 98 George Crane DT	Linebackers: 51 Jim Haslett ILB; 52 Wally Case OLB; 55 Mike Witteck ILB; 58 Lynwood Alford OLB; 90 Jay Brophy ILB; 91 Ladell Wills OLB; 92 Ken Rose OLB; 96 Henry Walls OLB; Defensive backs: 21 Treg Songy S; 22 Sean Dykes CB; 40 Marc Hogan CB; 49 Larry Robinson CB; 25 George Radachowsky S; 44 Trent Collins S; Special teams: 11 Pat Ragusa K; 14 Tom O'Connor P

== Roster ==
1987 New York Jets roster
Quarterbacks (QB): 8 Tom Flick; 7 Ken O'Brien; 10 Pat Ryan; Running backs (RB): 31 Marion Barber; 23 Dennis Bligen; 30 Nuu Faaola; 34 Johnny Hector; 24 Freeman McNeil; 43 Roger Vick; Wide receivers (WR): 86 Tracy Martin; 87 Kurt Sohn; 88 Al Toon; 83 Jo-Jo Townsell; Tight ends (TE): 81 Billy Griggs; 89 Rocky Klever; 82 Mickey Shuler	Offensive linemen (OL): 60 Dan Alexander G/T; 63 Ted Banker G; 64 Guy Bingham C; 79 Mike Haight G; 72 Gordon King T; 68 Reggie McElroy T; 53 Jim Sweeney T; Defensive linemen (DL): 97 Don Baldwin DE; 78 Barry Bennett DE; 98 Jerome Foster DE; 99 Mark Gastineau DE; 73 Joe Klecko NT; 91 Marty Lyons DE; 94 Scott Mersereau NT; 77 Gerald Nichols DT	Linebackers (LB): 54 Troy Benson ILB; 59 Kyle Clifton ILB; 50 Bob Crable OLB; 52 Onzy Elam OLB; 55 Alex Gordon OLB; 57 Kevin McArthur ILB; 58 Matt Monger OLB; 92 Ken Rose OLB; Defensive backs (DB): 22 Sean Dykes CB; 39 Harry Hamilton FS; 47 Jerry Holmes CB; 28 Carl Howard CB; 48 Bobby Humphery CB; 21 Sid Lewis CB; 36 Rich Miano SS; 25 George Radachowsky FS; 38 Mike Zordich SS; Special teams (ST): 4 Dave Jennings P; 5 Pat Leahy K	Reserve: 95 Tom Baldwin DE (IR); -- Darryl Caldwell G (IR); 27 Russell Carter CB (IR); 65 Joe Fields G (IR); 35 Kerry Glenn CB (IR); 84 Michael Harper WR (IR); 51 Jim Haslett LB (IR); 26 Lester Lyles FS (IR); 56 Lance Mehl LB (IR); 85 Wesley Walker WR (IR); Rookies in italics

== Regular season ==
=== Schedule ===
Week	Date	Opponent	Result	Record	Venue	Attendance
1	September 13	at **Buffalo Bills**	**W** 31–28	1–0	Rich Stadium	76,718
2	September 21	**New England Patriots**	**W** 43–24	2–0	Giants Stadium	70,847
3	September 27	at Pittsburgh Steelers	Cancelled due to players' strike			
4	October 4	Dallas Cowboys	**L** 24–38	2–1	Giants Stadium	12,370
5	October 11	at **Indianapolis Colts**	**L** 0–6	2–2	Hoosier Dome	34,927
6	October 18	**Miami Dolphins**	**W** 37–31 (OT)	3–2	Giants Stadium	18,249
7	October 25	at Washington Redskins	**L** 16–17	3–3	Robert F. Kennedy Memorial Stadium	53,497
8	November 1	**Indianapolis Colts**	**L** 14–19	3–4	Giants Stadium	60,863
9	November 9	Seattle Seahawks	**W** 30–14	4–4	Giants Stadium	60,452
10	November 15	at Kansas City Chiefs	**W** 16–9	5–4	Arrowhead Stadium	40,718
11	November 22	**Buffalo Bills**	**L** 14–17	5–5	Giants Stadium	58,407
12	November 29	Cincinnati Bengals	**W** 27–20	6–5	Giants Stadium	41,135
13	December 7	at **Miami Dolphins**	**L** 28–37	6–6	Joe Robbie Stadium	62,592
14	December 13	at **New England Patriots**	**L** 20–42	6–7	Sullivan Stadium	60,617
15	December 20	Philadelphia Eagles	**L** 27–38	6–8	Giants Stadium	30,572
16	December 27	at New York Giants	**L** 7–20	6–9	Giants Stadium	68,318
Note: Intra-division opponents are in **bold** text.

=== Season summary ===
==== Week 1 ====
Team	1	2	3	4	Total
• Jets	0	14	10	7	31
Bills	0	7	7	14	28

- Date: September 13
- Location: Rich Stadium, Orchard Park, New York
- Game start: 1:00 p.m. EST
- Game weather: 70 °F (21.1 °C); wind 9 miles per hour (14 km/h; 7.8 kn)
- Referee: Fred Wyant
- TV announcers (NBC): Marv Albert and Joe Namath

Scoring summary
Q2	BUF	Johnson 26-yard pass from Kelly (Norwood kick)	BUF 7–0
Q2	NYJ	Walker 55-yard pass from O'Brien (Leahy kick)	Tie 7–7
Q2	NYJ	Shuler 4-yard pass from O'Brien (Leahy kick)	NYJ 14–7
Q3	NYJ	Leahy 29-yard field goal	NYJ 17–7
Q3	BUF	Burkett 6-yard pass from Kelly (Norwood kick)	NYJ 17–14
Q3	NYJ	Hector 2-yard run (Leahy kick)	NYJ 24–14
Q4	BUF	Riddick 2-yard run (Norwood kick)	NYJ 24–21
Q4	NYJ	Hector 1-yard run (Leahy kick)	NYJ 31–21
Q4	BUF	Riddick 1-yard pass from Kelly (Norwood kick)	NYJ 31–28

==== Week 2 ====
Team	1	2	3	4	Total
Patriots	0	3	7	14	24
• Jets	6	0	21	16	43

- Date: September 21
- Location: Giants Stadium, East Rutherford, New Jersey
- Game start: 9:00 p.m. EST
- Game weather: 62 °F (16.7 °C); wind 10 miles per hour (16 km/h; 8.7 kn)
- Referee: Jerry Seeman
- TV announcers (ABC): Frank Gifford, Al Michaels, Dan Dierdorf

Scoring summary
Q1	NYJ	Leahy 37-yard field goal	NYJ 3–0
Q1	NYJ	Leahy 34-yard field goal	NYJ 6–0
Q2	NE	Franklin 32-yard field goal	NYJ 6–3
Q3	NYJ	Toon 58-yard pass from O'Brien (Leahy kick)	NYJ 13–3
Q3	NYJ	Hector 5-yard run (Leahy kick)	NYJ 20–3
Q3	NE	Tippett 29-yard fumble return (Franklin kick)	NYJ 20–10
Q3	NYJ	Hector 9-yard run (Leahy kick)	NYJ 27–10
Q4	NYJ	Safety, Lyons tackled Tatupu in end zone	NYJ 29–10
Q4	NE	Baty 1-yard pass from Eason (Franklin kick)	NYJ 29–17
Q4	NYJ	Fa'aola 1-yard run (Leahy kick)	NYJ 36–17
Q4	NE	Starring 12-yard pass from Eason (Franklin kick)	NYJ 36–24
Q4	NYJ	Fa'aola 1-yard run (Leahy kick)	NYJ 43–24

==== Week 5 ====
Team	1	2	3	4	OT	Total
Dolphins	10	0	7	14	0	31
• Jets	0	17	0	14	6	37

- Date: October 18
- Location: Giants Stadium, East Rutherford, New Jersey
- Game start: 1:00 p.m. EST
- Game weather: 61 °F (16.1 °C); wind 10 miles per hour (16 km/h; 8.7 kn)
- Referee: Dick Jorgensen
- TV announcers (NBC): Marv Albert and Joe Namath

Scoring summary
Q1	MIA	Beecher 19-yard field goal	MIA 3–0
Q1	MIA	Smith 5-yard pass from Mackey (Beecher kick)	MIA 10–0
Q2	NYJ	Harper 35-yard pass from Ryan (Ragusa kick)	MIA 10–7
Q2	NYJ	E. Hunter 7-yard pass from Ryan (Ragusa kick)	NYJ 14–10
Q2	NYJ	Ragusa 34-yard field goal	NYJ 17–10
Q3	MIA	Mackey 1-yard run (Beecher kick)	Tie 17–17
Q4	NYJ	Bligen 7-yard run (Ragusa kick)	NYJ 24–17
Q4	NYJ	S. Hunter 5-yard pass from Ryan (Ragusa kick)	NYJ 31–17
Q4	MIA	Mackey 5-yard run (Beecher kick)	NYJ 31–24
Q4	MIA	Lewis 1-yard pass from Mackey (Beecher kick)	Tie 31–31
OT	NYJ	E. Hunter 8-yard pass from Ryan	NYJ 37–31

==== Week 8 ====
Team	1	2	3	4	Total
Seahawks	0	0	14	0	14
• Jets	0	10	10	10	30

- Date: November 9
- Location: Giants Stadium, East Rutherford, New Jersey
- Game start: 9:00 p.m. EST
- Game weather: 62 °F (16.7 °C); wind 17 miles per hour (27 km/h; 15 kn)
- Referee: Gene Barth
- TV announcers (ABC): Frank Gifford, Al Michaels, Dan Dierdorf

Scoring summary
Q2	NYJ	Townsell 91-yard punt return (Leahy kick)	NYJ 7–0
Q2	NYJ	Leahy 35-yard field goal	NYJ 10–0
Q3	NYJ	Leahy 36-yard field goal	NYJ 13–0
Q3	SEA	Warner 3-yard run (Johnson kick)	NYJ 13–7
Q3	SEA	Largent 29-yard pass from Krieg (Johnson kick)	SEA 14–13
Q3	NYJ	Griggs 4-yard pass from O'Brien (Leahy kick)	NYJ 20–14
Q4	NYJ	Hector 1-yard run (Leahy kick)	NYJ 27–14
Q4	NYJ	Leahy 26-yard field goal	NYJ 30–14

==== Week 9 ====
Team	1	2	3	4	Total
• Jets	3	0	3	10	16
Chiefs	0	3	6	0	9

- Date: November 15
- Location: Arrowhead Stadium, Kansas City, Missouri
- Game start: 1:00 p.m. EST
- Game weather: 57 °F (13.9 °C); wind 16 miles per hour (26 km/h; 14 kn)
- Referee: Fred Silva
- TV announcers (NBC): Don Criqui and Paul Maguire

Scoring summary
Q1	NYJ	Leahy 39-yard field goal	NYJ 3–0
Q2	KC	Lowery 42-yard field goal	Tie 3–3
Q3	KC	Lowery 43-yard field goal	KC 6–3
Q3	NYJ	Leahy 24-yard field goal	Tie 6–6
Q3	KC	Lowery 18-yard field goal	KC 9–6
Q4	NYJ	Toon 18-yard pass from O'Brien (Leahy kick)	NYJ 13–9
Q4	NYJ	Leahy 21-yard field goal	NYJ 16–9

==== Week 11 ====
Team	1	2	3	4	Total
Bengals	0	10	7	3	20
• Jets	7	10	0	10	27

- Date: November 29
- Location: Giants Stadium, East Rutherford, New Jersey
- Game start: 1:00 p.m. EST
- Game weather: 45 °F (7.2 °C); wind 18 miles per hour (29 km/h; 16 kn)
- Referee: Bob McElwee
- TV announcers: Marv Albert and Joe Namath

Scoring summary
Q1	NYJ	McNeil 18-yard pass from O'Brien (Leahy kick)	NYJ 7–0
Q2	NYJ	Leahy 24-yard field goal	NYJ 10–0
Q2	CIN	Brown 17-yard pass from Esiason (Breech kick)	NYJ 10–7
Q2	NYJ	Hector 1-yard run (Leahy kick)	NYJ 17–7
Q2	CIN	Breech 31-yard field goal	NYJ 17–10
Q3	CIN	Kattus 3-yard pass from Esiason (Breech kick)	Tie 17–17
Q4	CIN	Breech 35-yard field goal	CIN 20–17
Q4	NYJ	Leahy 23-yard field goal	Tie 20–20
Q4	NYJ	Miano 67-yard blocked field goal return (Leahy kick)	NYJ 27–20

=== Standings ===
AFC East
	W	L	T	PCT	DIV	CONF	PF	PA	STK
^{(3)} Indianapolis Colts	9	6	0	.600	5–3	8–6	300	238	W2
New England Patriots	8	7	0	.533	6–2	8–4	320	293	W3
Miami Dolphins	8	7	0	.533	2–6	5–7	362	335	L1
Buffalo Bills	7	8	0	.467	4–4	6–6	270	305	L2
New York Jets	6	9	0	.400	3–5	6–5	334	360	L4

== Awards and records ==
- Johnny Hector, Led AFC, Touchdowns, 11 TD's
