= 1988 New York Jets season =

1988 season of NFL team New York Jets

- Owner: Leon Hess
- Head coach: Joe Walton
- Offensive coordinator: Rich Kotite
- Defensive coordinator: Bud Carson
- Home stadium: The Meadowlands

Results
- Record: 8–7–1
- Division place: 4th AFC East
- Playoffs: Did not qualify
- Pro Bowlers: TE Mickey Shuler; WR Al Toon; FS Erik McMillan

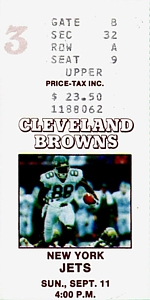
A ticket for a September 1988 game between the Jets and the Cleveland Browns.

The 1988 New York Jets season was the 29th season for the team and the 19th in the National Football League. It began with the team trying to improve upon its 6–9 record from 1987 under head coach Joe Walton. The Jets finished the season with a record of 8–7–1. Although for the second straight year they failed to qualify for the playoffs, they would play the spoiler, as a victory over their cross-town rival New York Giants in week 16 kept the Giants out of the playoffs due to a series of tiebreakers. For the third time in his career, Ken O'Brien had the lowest rate of interceptions among quarterbacks. He had 7 interceptions in 424 passing attempts.

The Jets endured a major distraction when Mark Gastineau, the team's main pass rusher who appeared to be experiencing a career-renaissance, abruptly retired in midseason to tend to ailing actress Brigitte Nielsen.

== Offseason ==
=== Draft ===
1988 New York Jets draft
Round	Pick	Player	Position	College	Notes
1	8	Dave Cadigan	Offensive tackle	USC	
2	37	Terry Williams	Cornerback	Bethune-Cookman	
3	63	Erik McMillan	Safety	Missouri	
3	74	James Hasty	Cornerback	Washington State	
5	119	Mike Withycombe	Offensive guard	Fresno State	
6	146	Paul Frase	Defensive end	Syracuse	
7	172	Gary Patton	Running back	Eastern Michigan	
8	203	Keith Neubert	Tight end	Nebraska	
9	230	Ralph Tamm	Offensive guard	West Chester	
10	257	John Booty	Cornerback	TCU	
11	287	John Galvin	Linebacker	Boston College	
12	314	Albert Goss	Defensive Tackle	Jackson State	
Made roster † Pro Football Hall of Fame * Made at least one Pro Bowl during career

=== Undrafted free agents ===
1988 undrafted free agents of note
Player	Position	College
Phil Alfieri	Defensive end	Oregon
Kelly Averitt	Tackle/Guard	Tennessee Tech
Greg Calcagno	Quarterback	Santa Clara
Harold Collins	Wide receiver	UTEP
Byron Dixon	Cornerback/Safety	Holy Cross
Keith Ferrell	Linebacker	Morehead State
Ricky Flowers	Wide receiver	Jackson State
Blair Fowler	Defensive tackle	UTEP
John Garrett	Center	Syracuse
Leon Hall	Defensive end	East Carolina
Bruce Hatfield	Linebacker	Tennessee Tech
Dave Ingalls	Center	Maine
Greg Johns	Linebacker	Penn State
Matt Kemper	Guard/Tackle	Miami (OH)
Brad Lambert	Cornerback/Safety	Kansas State
Eric Lewis	Wide receiver	North Carolina
Darryl Pearson	Wide receiver	Alabama State
Richard Petitbon	Linebacker	Maryland
Edwin Ross	Safety	Alabama State
Tom Schulting	Wide receiver	Iowa State
Russell Sheffield	Defensive end	Baylor
Mike Swanson	Defensive Tackle	Temple
Darryl Wright	Punter	Maryland

== Personnel ==
1988 New York Jets staff
Front office: Owner – Leon Hess; President/general manager – Jim Kensil; Head coaches: Head coach – Joe Walton; Offensive coaches: Offensive coordinator/receivers coach – Rich Kotite; Quarterbacks Coach - Zeke Bratkowski; Running backs coach – Bobby Hammond; Offensive line coach – Dan Radakovich	Defensive coaches: Defensive coordinator – Bud Carson; Defensive line coach = Wally Chambers; Linebackers coach - Jim Vechiarella; Secondary - Mike Faulkner; Special teams coaches: Special teams coach - Larry Pasquale; Quality control - Ray Callahan

== Roster ==
1988 New York Jets roster
Quarterbacks (QB): 7 Ken O'Brien; 10 Pat Ryan; Running backs (RB): 31 Marion Barber; 30 Nuu Faaola; 34 Johnny Hector; 24 Freeman McNeil; 43 Roger Vick; Wide receivers (WR): 84 Michael Harper; 87 Kurt Sohn; 88 Al Toon; 83 Jo-Jo Townsell; 85 Wesley Walker; Tight ends (TE): 80 K. D. Dunn; 81 Billy Griggs; 86 Keith Neubert; 82 Mickey Shuler	Offensive linemen (OL): 60 Dan Alexander G; 63 Ted Banker G; 61 Jeff Criswell T; 79 Mike Haight G; 68 Reggie McElroy T; 53 Jim Sweeney C; 76 Mike Withycombe G; Defensive linemen (DL): 95 Tom Baldwin DE; 91 Paul Frase DE; 74 Mark Garalczyk DE; 93 Marty Lyons DE; 94 Scott Mersereau NT; 77 Gerald Nichols NT	Linebackers (LB): 54 Troy Benson OLB; 59 Kyle Clifton ILB; 90 Robin Cole OLB; 51 John Galvin ILB; 55 Alex Gordon OLB; 57 Kevin McArthur OLB; 92 Ken Rose OLB; Defensive backs (DB): 42 John Booty CB/S; 40 James Hasty CB; 28 Carl Howard CB; 48 Bobby Humphery CB; 36 Rich Miano SS; 25 George Radachowsky FS; 33 Terry Williams CB; 38 Mike Zordich FS; Special teams (ST): 5 Pat Leahy K; 6 Joe Prokop P; 75 Adam Schreiber LS	Reserve: 64 Guy Bingham C (IR); 66 Dave Cadigan T (IR); 50 Bob Crable LB (IR); -- Bobby Curtis LB (IR); -- Glenn Dennison TE (IR); 52 Onzy Elam LB (IR); 35 Kerry Glenn CB (PUP); 89 Rocky Klever TE (IR); -- Mark Krerowicz G (IR); -- Jamie Kurisko TE (IR); 15 Kyle Mackey QB (IR); 22 Erik McMillan S (IR); 46 Mike Mitchell CB (IR); 58 Matt Monger LB (IR); -- Tim O'Malley LB (IR); 19 Bobby Riley WR (IR); -- Bill Sanders TE (IR); 67 Ralph Tamm C/G (IR); Rookies in italics 47 active, 18 reserve

=== Starters ===
POS	Name	GS
QB	7 Ken O'Brien	12
RB	24 Freeman McNeil	16
FB	43 Roger Vick	12
WR	88 Al Toon	15
WR	85 Wesley Walker	10
TE	82 Mickey Shuler	15
LT	61 Jeff Criswell	12
LG	79 Mike Haight	9
C	53 Jim Sweeney	16
RG	60 Dan Alexander	13
RT	68 Reggie McElroy	16

POS	Name	GS
LDE	99 Mark Gastineau	7
NT	94 Scott Mersereau	15
RDE	93 Marty Lyons	16
LOLB	55 Alex Gordon	13
LILB	54 Troy Benson	16
RILB	59 Kyle Clifton	15
ROLB	57 Kevin McArthur	16
LCB	48 Bobby Humphery	16
RCB	40 James Hasty	15
SS	36 Rich Miano	16
FS	22 Erik McMillan	13

== Regular season ==
=== Schedule ===
Week	Date	Opponent	Result	Record	Venue	Attendance
1	September 4	at **New England Patriots**	**L** 3–28	0–1	Sullivan Stadium	44,027
2	September 11	at Cleveland Browns	**W** 23–3	1–1	Cleveland Municipal Stadium	74,434
3	September 18	Houston Oilers	**W** 45–3	2–1	Giants Stadium	64,483
4	September 25	at Detroit Lions	**W** 17–10	3–1	Pontiac Silverdome	29,250
5	October 2	Kansas City Chiefs	**T** 17–17 (OT)	3–1–1	Giants Stadium	66,110
6	October 9	at Cincinnati Bengals	**L** 19–36	3–2–1	Riverfront Stadium	57,482
7	October 17	**Buffalo Bills**	**L** 14–37	3–3–1	Giants Stadium	70,218
8	October 23	at **Miami Dolphins**	**W** 44–30	4–3–1	Joe Robbie Stadium	68,292
9	October 30	Pittsburgh Steelers	**W** 24–20	5–3–1	Giants Stadium	64,862
10	November 6	at **Indianapolis Colts**	**L** 14–38	5–4–1	Hoosier Dome	59,233
11	November 13	**New England Patriots**	**L** 13–14	5–5–1	Giants Stadium	48,358
12	November 20	at **Buffalo Bills**	**L** 6–9 (OT)	5–6–1	Rich Stadium	78,389
13	November 27	**Miami Dolphins**	**W** 38–34	6–6–1	Giants Stadium	52,752
14	December 4	at Kansas City Chiefs	**L** 34–38	6–7–1	Arrowhead Stadium	30,059
15	December 10	**Indianapolis Colts**	**W** 34–16	7–7–1	Giants Stadium	46,284
16	December 18	New York Giants	**W** 27–21	8–7–1	Giants Stadium	69,770
Note: Intra-division opponents are in **bold** text.

=== Game summaries ===
==== Week 1 ====
Team	1	2	3	4	Total
Jets	3	0	0	0	3
• Patriots	3	3	10	12	28

- Date: September 4
- Location: Sullivan Stadium, Foxboro, Massachusetts
- Game start: 4:00 p.m.
- Game weather: 63 °F (17.2 °C), wind 14 miles per hour (23 km/h; 12 kn)

==== Week 2 ====
Team	1	2	3	4	Total
• Jets	3	3	3	14	23
Browns	3	0	0	0	3

- Date: September 11
- Location: Cleveland Municipal Stadium, Cleveland, Ohio
- Game start: 4:00 p.m.
- Game weather: 65 °F (18.3 °C) • wind 5 miles per hour (8.0 km/h; 4.3 kn)
- Referee: Tom Dooley
- TV announcers (NBC): Mel Proctor and Al DeRogatis

Scoring summary
1	NYJ	Pat Leahy 22 yard field goal	Jets 3–0
1	CLE	Matt Bahr 47 yard field goal	Tie 3–3
2	NYJ	Pat Leahy 29 yard field goal	Jets 6–3
3	NYJ	Pat Leahy 23 yard field goal	Jets 9–3
4	NYJ	Roger Vick 1 yard run (Pat Leahy kick)	Jets 16–3
4	NYJ	Roger Vick 3 yard run (Pat Leahy kick)	Jets 23–3

==== Week 3 ====
Team	1	2	3	4	Total
Oilers	3	0	0	0	3
• Jets	14	14	3	14	45

- Date: September 18
- Location: Giants Stadium, East Rutherford, New Jersey
- Game start: 1:00 p.m.
- Game weather: 67 °F (19.4 °C), wind 12 miles per hour (19 km/h; 10 kn)
- Referee: Bob McElwee
- Television network: NBC

==== Week 4 ====
Team	1	2	3	4	Total
• Jets	3	7	0	7	17
Lions	3	0	7	0	10

- Date: September 25
- Location: Pontiac Silverdome, Pontiac, Michigan
- Game weather: indoors (dome)
- Referee: Gordon McCarter
- TV announcers (NBC): Merle Harmon and Joe Namath

==== Week 5 ====
Team	1	2	3	4	OT	Total
Chiefs	0	0	3	14	0	17
Jets	3	7	0	7	0	17

- Date: October 2
- Location: Giants Stadium, East Rutherford, New Jersey
- Game start: 4:00 p.m.
- Game weather: 70 °F (21.1 °C), wind 14 miles per hour (23 km/h; 12 kn)
- Referee: Ben Dreith
- Television network: NBC

==== Week 6 ====
Team	1	2	3	4	Total
Jets	9	3	7	0	19
• Bengals	6	13	7	0	26

- Date: October 9
- Location: Riverfront Stadium, Cincinnati
- Game start: 1:00 p.m.
- Game weather: 51 °F (10.6 °C), wind 9 miles per hour (14 km/h; 7.8 kn)
- Referee: Dick Hantak
- TV announcers (NBC): Don Criqui and Bob Trumpy

==== Week 7 ====
Team	1	2	3	4	Total
• Bills	17	14	3	3	37
Jets	0	7	7	0	14

- Date: October 17
- Location: Giants Stadium, East Rutherford, New Jersey
- Game start: 9:00 p.m. EST
- Game weather: 63 °F (17.2 °C), wind 13 miles per hour (21 km/h; 11 kn)
- Referee: Dick Jorgensen
- TV announcers (ABC): Frank Gifford, Al Michaels, and Dan Dierdorf

==== Week 8 ====
Team	1	2	3	4	Total
• Jets	6	24	7	7	44
Dolphins	7	3	13	7	30

- Date: October 23
- Location: Joe Robbie Stadium, Miami, Florida
- Game start: 4:00 p.m.
- Game weather: 77 °F (25 °C), wind 11 miles per hour (18 km/h; 9.6 kn)
- Referee: Bob McElwee
- TV announcers (NBC): Dick Enberg and Merlin Olsen

==== Week 9 ====
Team	1	2	3	4	Total
Steelers	10	0	0	10	20
• Jets	0	10	7	7	24

- Date: October 30
- Location: Giants Stadium, East Rutherford, New Jersey
- Game start: 1:00 p.m.
- Game weather: 46 °F (7.8 °C), wind 14 miles per hour (23 km/h; 12 kn)
- Referee: Tom Dooley
- Television network: NBC

Scoring summary
1	PIT	Gary Anderson 25 yard field goal	Steelers 3–0
1	PIT	Rodney Carter 24 yard pass from Bubby Brister (Gary Anderson kick)	Steelers 10–0
2	NYJ	Pat Leahy 41 yard field goal	Steelers 10–3
2	NYJ	Mickey Shuler 2 yard pass from Ken O'Brien (Pat Leahy kick)	Tie 10–10
3	NYJ	Johnny Hector 2 yard run (Pat Leahy kick)	Jets 17–10
4	PIT	Gary Anderson 21 yard field goal	Jets 17–13
4	NYJ	Freeman McNeil 5 yard run (Pat Leahy kick)	Jets 24–13
4	PIT	Earnest Jackson 17 yard run (Gary Anderson kick)	Jets 24–20

==== Week 10 ====
Team	1	2	3	4	Total
Jets	0	14	0	0	14
• Colts	7	3	21	7	38

- Date: November 6
- Location: Hoosier Dome, Indianapolis, Indiana
- Game start: 4:00 p.m.
- Game weather: indoors (dome)

==== Week 11 ====
Team	1	2	3	4	Total
• Patriots	0	0	7	7	14
Jets	0	3	3	7	13

- Date: November 13
- Location: Giants Stadium, East Rutherford, New Jersey
- Game start: 1:00 p.m.
- Game weather: 50 °F (10 °C), wind 18 miles per hour (29 km/h; 16 kn)

==== Week 12 ====
Team	1	2	3	4	OT	Total
Jets	0	3	0	3	0	6
• **Bills**	0	0	3	3	3	9

- Date: November 20
- Location: Rich Stadium • Orchard Park, New York
- Game start: 1:00 p.m. EST
- Game attendance: 78,389
- Game weather: 43 °F (6.1 °C) • wind 10 miles per hour (16 km/h; 8.7 kn)

Scoring summary
2	NYJ	Pat Leahy 23 yard field goal	Jets 3–0
3	BUF	Scott Norwood 25 yard field goal	Tie 3–3
4	BUF	Scott Norwood 26 yard field goal	Bills 6–3
4	NYJ	Pat Leahy 40 yard field goal	Tie 6–6
OT	BUF	Scott Norwood 30 yard field goal	Bills 9–6

==== Week 13 ====
Team	1	2	3	4	Total
Dolphins	7	7	20	0	34
• Jets	7	17	0	14	38

- Date: November 27
- Location: Giants Stadium, East Rutherford, New Jersey
- Game start: 1:00 p.m.
- Game weather: 54 °F (12.2 °C), wind 9 miles per hour (14 km/h; 7.8 kn)
- Referee: Jerry Seeman
- TV announcers (NBC): Don Criqui and Bob Trumpy

==== Week 14 ====
Team	1	2	3	4	Total
Jets	10	10	7	7	34
• Chiefs	14	7	0	17	38

- Date: December 4
- Location: Arrowhead Stadium, Kansas City, Missouri
- Game start: 3:00 p.m.
- Game weather: 35 °F (1.7 °C), wind 11 miles per hour (18 km/h; 9.6 kn)

==== Week 15 ====
Team	1	2	3	4	Total
Colts	6	7	3	0	16
• Jets	10	0	21	3	34

- Date: December 10
- Location: Giants Stadium, East Rutherford, New Jersey
- Game start: 12:30 p.m.
- Game weather: 31 °F (−0.6 °C), wind 14 miles per hour (23 km/h; 12 kn)
- Referee: Johnny Grier
- TV announcers (NBC): Dick Enberg and Merlin Olsen

==== Week 16 ====
Team	1	2	3	4	Total
Giants	0	7	7	7	21
• Jets	10	3	7	7	27

- Date: December 18
- Location: Giants Stadium, East Rutherford, New Jersey
- Game start: 1:00 p.m.
- Game weather: 25 °F (−3.9 °C), wind 15 miles per hour (24 km/h; 13 kn)
- Referee: Gordon McCarter
- TV announcers (CBS): Verne Lundquist and Terry Bradshaw

Scoring summary
1		NYJ	Pat Leahy 41 yard field goal	Jets 3–0
1		NYJ	Mickey Shuler 5 yard pass from Ken O'Brien (Pat Leahy kick)	Jets 10–0
2		NYJ	Pat Leahy 20 yard field goal	Jets 13–0
2		NYG	Stephen Baker 5 yard pass from Phil Simms (Paul McFadden kick)	Jets 13–7
3		NYJ	Freeman McNeil 6 yard run (Pat Leahy kick)	Jets 20–7
3		NYG	Stephen Baker 9 yard pass from Phil Simms (Paul McFadden kick)	Jets 20–14
4		NYG	Lionel Manuel 9 yard pass from Phil Simms (Paul McFadden kick)	Giants 21–20
4	:37	NYJ	Al Toon 5 yard pass from Ken O'Brien (Pat Leahy kick)	Jets 27–21

=== Standings ===
AFC East
	W	L	T	PCT	DIV	CONF	PF	PA	STK
^{(2)} Buffalo Bills	12	4	0	.750	7–1	10–2	329	237	L1
Indianapolis Colts	9	7	0	.563	5–3	7–5	354	315	W1
New England Patriots	9	7	0	.563	5–3	7–5	250	284	L1
New York Jets	8	7	1	.531	3–5	6–7–1	372	354	W2
Miami Dolphins	6	10	0	.375	0–8	3–9	319	380	L1
