= 1989 New York Jets season =

1989 season of NFL team New York Jets

- Owner: Leon Hess
- Head coach: Joe Walton
- Offensive coordinator: Rich Kotite
- Defensive coordinator: Ralph Hawkins
- Home stadium: The Meadowlands

Results
- Record: 4–12
- Division place: 5th AFC East
- Playoffs: Did not qualify
- Pro Bowlers: FS Erik McMillan

The 1989 New York Jets season was the 30th season for the franchise and the 20th in the National Football League. It began with the team trying to improve upon its 8–7–1 record from 1988 under head coach Joe Walton, hoping to return to the playoffs for the first time since 1986.

Instead, the Jets finished the season with a record of 4–12, their worst since 1980. They lost six of their first seven games to start the year and finished with three consecutive losses, two of which were shutouts. Their last place finish in the AFC East, combined with fan discontent at the Jets’ play, led to Walton’s firing at the end of the season.

== Offseason ==
=== NFL draft ===
1989 New York Jets draft
Round	Pick	Player	Position	College	Notes
1	14	Jeff Lageman	Linebacker	Virginia	
2	42	Dennis Byrd	Defensive End	Tulsa	
3	70	Joe Mott	Linebacker	Iowa	
4	98	Ron Stallworth	Defensive End	Auburn	
5	126	Tony Martin *	Wide receiver	Mesa State	
6	151	Marvin Washington	Defensive End	Idaho	
6	153	Titus Dixon	Wide receiver	Troy State	
7	181	Stevon Moore	Safety	Ole Miss	
8	209	A. B. Brown	Running Back	West Virginia	
9	237	Pat Marlatt	Defensive tackle	West Virginia	
10	265	Adam Bob	Linebacker	Texas A&M	
11	293	Artie Holmes	Safety	Washington State	
12	321	Willie Snead	Wide receiver	Florida	
Made roster * Made at least one Pro Bowl during career

=== Undrafted free agents ===
1989 undrafted free agents of note
Player	Position	College
Reggie Barnes	Running back	Delaware State
Eric Dahlquist	Quarterback	Kenyon (OH)
James Harris	Quarterback	Lehigh
Tim Healy	Running back	Delaware
Tony Miller	Running back	Lafayette
Irvin Smith	Defensive Back	Maryland
Greg Werner	Tight end	DePauw

== Personnel ==
1989 New York Jets staff
Front office: Owner – Leon Hess; President – Steve Gutman; Head coaches: Head coach/general manager – Joe Walton; Offensive coaches: Offensive coordinator/receivers coach – Rich Kotite; Quarterbacks coach - Zeke Bratkowski; Running backs coach - Bobby Hammond; Offensive line coach - Rod Humeniuk	Defensive coaches: Defensive coordinator – Ralph Hawkins; Defensive line coach = Wally Chambers; Linebackers coach - Jim Vechiarella; Secondary - Mike Faulkiner; Special teams coaches: Special teams coach - Larry Pasquale; Quality control - Ray Callahan

== Roster ==
1989 New York Jets roster
Quarterbacks (QB): 11 Tony Eason; 15 Kyle Mackey; 7 Ken O'Brien; 10 Pat Ryan; Running backs (RB): 30 Brad Baxter FB; 29 A. B. Brown KR; 34 Johnny Hector; 24 Freeman McNeil; 43 Roger Vick; Wide receivers (WR): 87 Chris Burkett; 89 Phil Epps; 88 Al Toon; 83 Jo-Jo Townsell; Tight ends (TE): 84 Chris Dressel; 86 Keith Neubert; 83 Greg Werner	Offensive linemen (OL): 60 Dan Alexander G; 66 Dave Cadigan G; 61 Jeff Criswell T; 79 Mike Haight G; 70 Jeff Oliver G/T; 74 Curt Singer T; 53 Jim Sweeney C; Defensive linemen (DL): 90 Dennis Byrd DE; 91 Paul Frase DE; 94 Scott Mersereau NT; 77 Gerald Nichols NT; 96 Ron Stallworth DE; 97 Marvin Washington DE	Linebackers (LB): 54 Troy Benson OLB; 52 Adam Bob ILB; 59 Kyle Clifton ILB; 55 Alex Gordon OLB; 56 Jeff Lageman OLB; 51 Joe Mott OLB; 92 Ken Rose OLB; Defensive backs (DB): 42 John Booty SS; 35 Kerry Glenn CB; 40 James Hasty CB; 28 Carl Howard CB; 48 Bobby Humphery CB; 20 Leander Knight FS; 22 Erik McMillan FS; 25 George Radachowsky SS; Special teams (ST): 5 Pat Leahy K; 6 Joe Prokop P; 75 Adam Schreiber LS	Practice squad: 17 Sanjay Beach WR; 69 Jon Burman T; Reserve: 31 Marion Barber RB (IR); 81 Billy Griggs TE (IR); 84 Michael Harper WR (IR); 93 Marty Lyons DE (IR); 57 Kevin McArthur LB (IR); 68 Reggie McElroy T (IR); 36 Rich Miano S (IR); 27 Stevon Moore S (IR); 82 Mickey Shuler TE (IR); 23 Irvin Smith CB (IR); 85 Wesley Walker WR (IR); 33 Terry Williams CB (IR); 76 Mike Withycombe G/T (IR); Rookies in italics 47 active, 13 reserve, 2 practice squad

== Regular season ==
=== Schedule ===
Week	Date	Opponent	Result	Record	Venue	Attendance
1	September 10	**New England Patriots**	**L** 24–27	0–1	Giants Stadium	64,541
2	September 17	at Cleveland Browns	**L** 24–38	0–2	Cleveland Stadium	73,516
3	September 24	at **Miami Dolphins**	**W** 40–33	1–2	Joe Robbie Stadium	65,908
4	October 1	**Indianapolis Colts**	**L** 10–17	1–3	Giants Stadium	65,542
5	October 9	Los Angeles Raiders	**L** 7–14	1–4	Giants Stadium	68,040
6	October 15	at New Orleans Saints	**L** 14–29	1–5	Louisiana Superdome	59,521
7	October 22	at **Buffalo Bills**	**L** 3–34	1–6	Rich Stadium	76,811
8	October 29	San Francisco 49ers	**L** 10–23	1–7	Giants Stadium	62,805
9	November 5	at **New England Patriots**	**W** 27–26	2–7	Foxboro Stadium	53,366
10	November 12	**Miami Dolphins**	**L** 23–31	2–8	Giants Stadium	65,923
11	November 19	at **Indianapolis Colts**	**L** 10–27	2–9	Hoosier Dome	58,236
12	November 26	Atlanta Falcons	**W** 27–7	3–9	Giants Stadium	40,429
13	December 3	at San Diego Chargers	**W** 20–17	4–9	Jack Murphy Stadium	38,954
14	December 10	Pittsburgh Steelers	**L** 0–13	4–10	Giants Stadium	41,037
15	December 17	at Los Angeles Rams	**L** 14–38	4–11	Anaheim Stadium	53,063
16	December 23	**Buffalo Bills**	**L** 0–37	4–12	Giants Stadium	21,148
Note: Intra-division opponents are in **bold** text.

=== Standings ===
AFC East
	W	L	T	PCT	DIV	CONF	PF	PA	STK
^{(3)} Buffalo Bills	9	7	0	.563	6–2	8–4	409	317	W1
Indianapolis Colts	8	8	0	.500	4–4	7–5	298	301	L1
Miami Dolphins	8	8	0	.500	4–4	6–8	331	379	L2
New England Patriots	5	11	0	.313	4–4	5–7	297	391	L3
New York Jets	4	12	0	.250	2–6	3–9	253	411	L3

== Milestones ==
- Ken O'Brien had his third season with at least 3,000 yards passing.
