= 1990 New York Jets season =

1990 season of NFL team New York Jets

- Owner: Leon Hess
- General manager: Dick Steinberg
- Head coach: Bruce Coslet
- Defensive coordinator: Pete Carroll
- Home stadium: Giants Stadium

Results
- Record: 6–10
- Division place: 4th AFC East
- Playoffs: Did not qualify
- Pro Bowlers: None

The 1990 New York Jets season was the 31st season for the team and the 21st in the National Football League. It began with the team, under new head coach Bruce Coslet, trying to improve from winning only four games in 1989 under Joe Walton. The Jets finished the season at 6–10.

== Offseason ==
The Jets modified their uniforms for the 1990 season, adding a thin black outline to the numerals, striping and helmet decals and changing the facemask color from white to black. The team also added a set of green pants, to be worn with its white jerseys. The green pants had a single white stripe with thin black borders from hip to knee on each side. The new uniforms debuted in the regular-season opener on September 9 at Cincinnati; the team wore its previous uniforms, without the black trim, in preseason games.

=== Coaching change ===
On December 26, 1989, the New York Jets fired head coach Joe Walton after seven seasons following a 4–12 record to end the 1989 NFL season. His entire coaching staff was also dismissed. On February 6, 1990, the team hired Cincinnati Bengals offensive coordinator Bruce Coslet as their new head coach. Among Coslet’s hires was Minnesota Vikings defensive backs coach Pete Carroll, who became his defensive coordinator.

=== NFL draft ===
Round	Pick	Player	Position	School/Club team
1	2	Blair Thomas	Running Back	Penn State
2	28	Reggie Rembert	Wide Receiver	West Virginia
3	56	Tony Stargell	Defensive Back	Tennessee State
4	84	Troy Taylor	Quarterback	California
5	112	Tony Savage	Defensive Tackle	Washington State
6	140	Terance Mathis	Wide Receiver	New Mexico
7	167	Dwayne White	Guard	Alcorn State
7	168	Basil Proctor	Linebacker	West Virginia
8	196	Roger Duffy	Guard	Penn State
9	223	Dale Dawkins	Wide Receiver	Miami (FL)
10	251	Brad Quast	Linebacker	Iowa
11	278	Derrick Kelson	Defensive Back	Purdue
12	306	Darrell Davis	Defensive End	TCU

=== Undrafted free agents ===
1990 undrafted free agents of note
Player	Position	College
Donnie Allen	Wide receiver	Georgia Southern
Demetrious Douglas	Linebacker	Georgia
Kevin Greene	Kicker	Syracuse

== Personnel ==
=== Staff ===
1990 New York Jets staff
Front office: Chairman of the board – Susan Hess; President – Steve Gutman; Vice president/general manager – Dick Steinberg; Director of player personnel – Ron Wolf; Director of pro personnel – Jim Royer; Head coaches: Head coach – Bruce Coslet; Offensive coaches: Quarterbacks – Joe Daniels; Running backs – Kippy Brown; Receivers – Chip Myers; Offensive line – Larry Beightol; Offensive assistant/tight ends – Bob Wylie	Defensive coaches: Defensive coordinator – Pete Carroll; Defensive line – Greg Robinson; Linebackers – Monte Kiffin; Defensive assistant/defensive backs – Ed Donatell; Special teams coaches: Special teams coordinator – Foge Fazio; Strength and conditioning: Strength and conditioning – Greg Mackrides; Assistant Strength and Conditioning - Lee Brandon

=== Roster ===
1990 New York Jets roster
Quarterbacks (QB): 11 Tony Eason; 7 Ken O'Brien; 14 Troy Taylor; Running backs (RB): 30 Brad Baxter FB; 34 Johnny Hector; 24 Freeman McNeil; 32 Blair Thomas; Wide receivers (WR): 87 Chris Burkett; 89 Dale Dawkins; 81 Terance Mathis; 85 Rob Moore; 83 Jo-Jo Townsell PR; Tight ends (TE): 80 Mark Boyer; 84 Chris Dressel; 47 Pat Kelly; 86 Doug Wellsandt	Offensive linemen (OL): 61 Jeff Criswell T; 62 Roger Duffy C; 79 Mike Haight G; 78 Scott Jones T; 64 Trevor Matich G; 72 Brett Miller T; 53 Jim Sweeney C/G; 67 Dwayne White G; 63 Dave Zawatson G/T; Defensive linemen (DL): 90 Dennis Byrd DT; 98 Darrell Davis DE; 56 Jeff Lageman DE; 94 Scott Mersereau DT; 77 Gerald Nichols DT; 96 Ron Stallworth DE; 97 Marvin Washington DE	Linebackers (LB): 59 Kyle Clifton MLB; 52 John Galvin MLB; 95 Troy Johnson OLB; 51 Joe Mott OLB; 57 Mac Stephens OLB; Defensive backs (DB): 42 John Booty CB/S; 40 James Hasty CB; 26 Ken Johnson FS; 23 Michael Mayes CB; 22 Erik McMillan FS; 21 Don Odegard CB; 45 Tony Stargell CB; 48 Brian Washington SS; Special teams (ST): 5 Pat Leahy K; 6 Joe Prokop P	Practice squad: 69 Mark Hofland T; Reserve: 54 Troy Benson LB (IR); 29 A. B. Brown RB (IR); 66 Dave Cadigan G (IR); 49 Travis Curtis S (IR); 44 Patrick Egu RB (IR); 91 Paul Frase DE (NF-Ill.); 58 Joe Kelly LB (IR); 93 Marty Lyons DE (IR); 92 Emanuel McNeil DT (IR); 20 Dennis Price CB (IR); 88 Al Toon WR (IR); 33 Terry Williams CB (PUP); Rookies in italics 47 active, 12 reserve, 1 practice squad

== Regular season ==
=== Schedule ===
Week	Date	Opponent	Result	Record	Venue	Attendance
1	September 9	at Cincinnati Bengals	**L** 20–25	0–1	Riverfront Stadium	56,467
2	September 16	Cleveland Browns	**W** 24–21	1–1	Giants Stadium	67,354
3	September 24	**Buffalo Bills**	**L** 7–30	1–2	Giants Stadium	69,927
4	September 30	at **New England Patriots**	**W** 37–13	2–2	Foxboro Stadium	36,724
5	October 7	at **Miami Dolphins**	**L** 16–20	2–3	Joe Robbie Stadium	69,678
6	October 14	San Diego Chargers	**L** 3–39	2–4	Giants Stadium	63,311
7	October 21	at **Buffalo Bills**	**L** 27–30	2–5	Rich Stadium	79,002
8	October 28	at Houston Oilers	**W** 17–12	3–5	Houston Astrodome	56,337
9	November 4	Dallas Cowboys	**W** 24–9	4–5	Giants Stadium	68,086
10	November 11	**Miami Dolphins**	**L** 3–17	4–6	Giants Stadium	68,362
11	November 18	at **Indianapolis Colts**	**L** 14–17	4–7	Hoosier Dome	47,283
12	November 25	Pittsburgh Steelers	**L** 7–24	4–8	Giants Stadium	57,806
13	December 2	at San Diego Chargers	**L** 17–38	4–9	Jack Murphy Stadium	40,877
14	Bye					
15	December 16	**Indianapolis Colts**	**L** 21–29	4–10	Giants Stadium	41,423
16	December 23	**New England Patriots**	**W** 42–7	5–10	Giants Stadium	30,250
17	December 30	at Tampa Bay Buccaneers	**W** 16–14	6–10	Tampa Stadium	46,543
Note: Intra-division opponents are in **bold** text.

=== Game summaries ===
==== Week 2 ====
Cleveland Browns (1–0) at New York Jets (0–1)

Team	1	2	3	4	Total
Browns	7	0	7	7	21
• Jets	14	10	0	0	24

- Date: September 16
- Location: Giants Stadium, East Rutherford, New Jersey
- Game start: 1:00 p.m.
- Game weather: 67 °F (19.4 °C); wind 12 miles per hour (19 km/h; 10 kn)
- Referee: Bob McElwee
- TV announcers (NBC): Marv Albert and Paul Maguire

Scoring summary
1	CLE	Eric Metcalf 98 yard kickoff return (Jerry Kauric kick)	CLE 7–0
1	NYJ	Freeman McNeil 2 yard run (Pat Leahy kick)	Tie 7–7
1	NYJ	Johnny Hector 6 yard run (Pat Leahy kick)	NYJ 14–7
2	NYJ	Pat Leahy 47 yard field goal	NYJ 17–7
2	NYJ	Brad Baxter 1 yard run (Pat Leahy kick)	NYJ 24–7
3	CLE	Reggie Langhorne 4 yard pass from Bernie Kosar (Jerry Kauric kick)	NYJ 24–14
4	CLE	Leroy Hoard 9 yard run (Jerry Kauric kick)	NYJ 24–21

=== Standings ===
AFC East
	W	L	T	PCT	DIV	CONF	PF	PA	STK
^{(1)} Buffalo Bills	13	3	0	.813	7–1	10–2	428	263	L1
^{(4)} Miami Dolphins	12	4	0	.750	7–1	10–2	336	242	W1
Indianapolis Colts	7	9	0	.438	3–5	5–7	281	353	L1
New York Jets	6	10	0	.375	2–6	4–10	295	345	W2
New England Patriots	1	15	0	.063	1–7	1–11	181	446	L14
