= Corvino =

Corvino may refer to:

- Anthony Corvino (born 1965), American football player
- Corvino, a character in Volpone
- John Corvino, professor of philosophy at Wayne State University
