= Donald Baldwin =

Donald or Don Baldwin may refer to:

- Donald Charles Baldwin (born 1953), American musician, arranger, and composer
- Don Baldwin (figure skater) (born 1977), American pair skater
- Don Baldwin (American football) (born 1964), American football player
- Donny Baldwin (born 1951), American drummer
