= Onzy =

Onzy is a given name. Notable people with the given name include:

- Onzy Elam (born 1964), American football player
- Onzy Matthews (1930–1997), American jazz pianist, singer, arranger, and composer
