= Scott Holman =

Scott Holman may refer to:

- Scott Holman (American football) (born 1962), former National Football League wide receiver
- Scott Earl Holman (born 1954), jazz pianist
- Scott Holman (baseball) (born 1958), former Major League Baseball pitcher
