= New York Jets all-time roster =

The New York Jets all-time roster is split by name into the following two lists:

- New York Jets all-time roster (A–K)
- New York Jets all-time roster (L–Z)
