= Nanuet Senior High School =

Public high school in Nanuet, New York, United States

Location
- 103 Church Street; Nanuet, New York 10954; 41°5′16″N 74°0′5″W

Information
- Type: Public
- Established: 1959
- School district: Nanuet Union Free School District
- Principal: Michael Mahoney
- Teaching staff: 66.92 (FTE)
- Grades: 9–12
- Enrollment: 761 (2023–2024)
- Student to teacher ratio: 11.37
- Colors: Black and gold
- Mascot: Golden Knight
- Accreditation: Blue Ribbon 2016, 2022
- Affiliations: Section 1 (NYSPHSAA)
- Website: nshs.nanuetsd.org

Nanuet Senior High School is a public high school located in Nanuet, New York. It is formally known as "Nanuet Senior High School: The John P. Burke Building," named after the school's long-time principal. The Nanuet Senior High School houses grades 9–12.

== School structure ==
Its leadership team consists of a principal and two assistant principals. In addition there are four guidance counselors, a dean, a nurse, a student assistance counselor, a psychologist, a school resource officer, and department chairpersons. It is part of the Nanuet Union Free School District.

== Curriculum ==
Nanuet's program offers courses in art, English, French, health, mathematics, music, physical education, science, social studies, Spanish language and technology.

== Athletics ==
Athletic teams are usually referred to as the "Nanuet Golden Knights."

Sports Teams:

- Cheerleading
- Cross Country
- Field Hockey (girls)
- Football
- Soccer
- Tennis
- Volleyball (girls)
- Basketball
- Bowling
- Track and Field
- Wrestling (boys)
- Lacrosse
- Golf
- Softball (girls)
- Baseball (boys)

== Notable alumni ==
- Charlie Adler: Known for his work on such cartoons as Tiny Toons, Rocko's Modern Life, and Cow and Chicken.
- Joseph Glover: Professor of mathematics, past provost of the University of Florida.
- Kenneth Kiesler: American symphony orchestra and opera conductor
- Jamie Kurisko: American football tight end
- James Maritato: professional wrestler known for his work with World Wrestling Entertainment and Extreme Championship Wrestling.
- Greg Reitman: Environmentalist, film director, and producer.
- Ronald Thomas (cellist): American classical cellist
- Scott Wittman: known for his work as a director, lyricist, and writer for Broadway, concerts, and television.
