= Derrick Gaffney =

American football player (1955–2025)

No. 81
- Position: Wide receiver

Personal information
- Born: May 24, 1955; Jacksonville, Florida, U.S.
- Died: March 17, 2025 (aged 69)
- Listed height: 6 ft 1 in (1.85 m)
- Listed weight: 181 lb (82 kg)

Career information
- High school: Raines (Jacksonville)
- College: Florida
- NFL draft: 1978: 8th round, 197th overall pick

Career history
- New York Jets (1978–1984, 1987)

Awards and highlights
- SEC record for longest touchdown reception (1977)

Career NFL statistics
- Receptions: 156
- Receiving yards: 2,613
- Touchdowns: 7
- Stats at Pro Football Reference

Derrick Tyrone Gaffney (May 24, 1955 – March 17, 2025) was an American professional football player who was a wide receiver for eight seasons with the New York Jets of the National Football League (NFL) during the 1970s and 1980s. Gaffney played college football for the Florida Gators.

== Background ==
Gaffney was born in Jacksonville, Florida, in 1955. He attended William M. Raines High School in Jacksonville, and he played high school football for the Raines Vikings

Gaffney died on March 17, 2025, at the age of 69.

== College career ==
Gaffney accepted an athletic scholarship to attend the University of Florida in Gainesville, Florida, where he played for coach Doug Dickey's Gators teams from 1974 to 1977. Memorably, Gaffney caught a ninety-nine-yard touchdown reception from Cris Collinsworth in the Gators' season-opening 48–3 victory over the Rice Owls in 1977, which tied the then-current NCAA record and remains the longest touchdown pass in Southeastern Conference (SEC) history. He finished that game with 14 receptions for 319 yards and two TDs. While he was a Florida undergraduate, Gaffney was also a member of Alpha Phi Alpha Fraternity.

== Professional career ==
The New York Jets chose Gaffney in the eighth round (197th pick overall) in the 1978 NFL draft, and he played for the Jets from 1978 to 1984 and again in 1987. His single best season was his rookie year in 1978, when he caught thirty-eight passes for 691 yards. Gaffney started sixty-eight of 100 games in which he played for the Jets, and finished his NFL career with 156 receptions for 2,613 yards and seven touchdowns.

In 2024, The Florida Times-Union named Gaffney the 69th best athlete in the history of Jacksonville and the surrounding counties.

== NFL career statistics ==
Legend
**Bold**	Career high

=== Regular season ===
Year	Team	Games		Receiving				
Year	Team	GP	GS	Rec	Yds	Avg	Lng	TD
1978	NYJ	**16**	**16**	**38**	**691**	18.2	**50**	**3**
1979	NYJ	**16**	**16**	32	534	16.7	43	1
1980	NYJ	13	5	24	397	16.5	36	2
1981	NYJ	**16**	13	14	246	17.6	39	0
1982	NYJ	9	2	11	207	**18.8**	45	1
1983	NYJ	**16**	10	17	243	14.3	35	0
1984	NYJ	12	7	19	285	15.0	29	0
1987	NYJ	2	0	1	10	10.0	10	0
		100	69	156	2,613	16.8	50	7

=== Playoffs ===
Year	Team	Games		Receiving				
Year	Team	GP	GS	Rec	Yds	Avg	Lng	TD
1981	NYJ	1	**1**	4	**64**	**16.0**	**26**	0
1982	NYJ	**3**	0	**5**	57	11.4	20	**1**
		4	1	9	121	13.4	26	1

== Gaffney football family ==
Gaffney's oldest brother, Don Gaffney, was the starting quarterback for the Florida Gators from the middle of the 1973 season through the end of 1975, and was the first African-American to become the starter at the quarterback position for the Gators. Brothers Derrick, Warren, and Johnny, also played for the Gators in the 70s, while another brother, Reggie, played baseball and football at Florida A&M.

Gaffney is the father of former NFL wide receiver Jabar Gaffney and the uncle of former NFL cornerback Lito Sheppard. Both Jabar Gaffney and Lito Sheppard played for the Florida Gators in the early 2000s.

== See also ==
- Florida Gators football, 1970–79
- List of Alpha Phi Alpha brothers
- List of Florida Gators in the NFL draft
- List of New York Jets players
