= Kyle Clifton =

American football player (born 1962)

No. 59
- Position: Linebacker

Personal information
- Born: August 23, 1962 (age 64); Olney, Texas, U.S.
- Listed height: 6 ft 4 in (1.93 m)
- Listed weight: 236 lb (107 kg)

Career information
- High school: Bridgeport (Bridgeport, Texas)
- College: TCU
- NFL draft: 1984: 3rd round, 64th overall pick

Career history
- New York Jets (1984–1996)

Awards and highlights
- 3× NFL combined tackles leader (1985, 1986, 1988)

Career NFL statistics
- Tackles: 1,484
- Sacks: 5.5
- Interceptions: 12
- Forced fumbles: 13
- Stats at Pro Football Reference

Ronald Kyle Clifton (born August 23, 1962) is an American former professional football player who was a linebacker for 13 seasons with the New York Jets of the National Football League (NFL). After playing college football for the TCU Horned Frogs, he was selected by the Jets in the third round of the 1984 NFL draft with the 64th overall pick.

He led the NFL in solo tackles with 160 in 1985, 174 in 1986 and 162 in 1988. Additionally, he was in the top 10 of NFL solo tacklers in 1984, 1985, 1986, 1988, 1989, 1990, and 1991. He briefly took the lead in career combined tackles away from Clay Matthews in 1993. He announced his retirement on February 14, 1997. At the time of his retirement, he was the second-leading tackler in NFL history and remains the Jets' all-time leading tackler. Clifton made 1,484 tackles over the course of his professional career ranking him 10th overall in combined tackles since 1987. Clifton attended high school in Bridgeport, Texas.

== NFL career statistics ==
Year	Team	Games		Tackles				Interceptions			Fumbles	
Year	Team	GP	GS	Cmb	Solo	Ast	Sck	Int	Yds	TD	FF	FR
1984	NYJ	16	9	113	–	–	0.0	1	0	0	0	1
1985	NYJ	16	16	160	–	–	0.0	3	10	0	2	2
1986	NYJ	16	16	174	–	–	0.0	2	8	0	1	1
1987	NYJ	12	8	51	–	–	0.0	0	0	0	0	0
1988	NYJ	16	15	162	–	–	0.0	0	0	0	0	2
1989	NYJ	16	16	162	–	–	2.0	0	0	0	2	1
1990	NYJ	16	16	199	–	–	0.5	3	49	0	1	1
1991	NYJ	16	16	146	–	–	1.0	1	3	0	2	0
1992	NYJ	16	16	138	–	–	1.0	1	1	0	3	4
1993	NYJ	16	16	143	–	–	1.0	1	3	0	2	2
1994	NYJ	16	5	32	19	13	0.0	0	0	0	0	1
1995	NYJ	16	0	4	1	3	0.0	0	0	0	0	0
1996	NYJ	16	0	0	0	0	0.0	0	0	0	0	0
Career		204	149	1,484	20	16	5.5	12	74	0	13	15
