= Lee Brandon =

American coach

- Occupation: Sports coach
- Website: leebrandon.com

Lee Brandon is an American coach.

== Biography ==
Early in her career, in 1979, Brandon sustained a severe injury, nearly losing her left arm in a fall through a glass door. Following an experimental procedure, she made a full recovery. Following this event, Brandon developed the AB-Inforcer core biofeedback and spine stabilization training system. The system has been used by various sports teams, including the Atlanta Falcons.

In 1990, Brandon joined the New York Jets' coaching staff. She became the first female strength coach in NFL history. Previously, she served as a U.S. Olympic coach four times.

In addition to her coaching career, Brandon has competed in long-drive golf. At the age of 35, she entered a golf contest and achieved a 265-yard drive. Later, she participated in the RE/MAX World Long Drive Championship and won the women's division.

In 2001, Brandon achieved a drive of 291 yards and 3 inches, winning the women's division of the World Long Drive competition.

In 2003, Brandon won the Women's World Long Drive Invitational Championship.
