= Vince Jasper =

American football player (born 1964)

No. 66
- Position: Offensive guard

Personal information
- Born: November 30, 1964 (age 61); Hawarden, Iowa, U.S.
- Listed height: 6 ft 4 in (1.93 m)
- Listed weight: 270 lb (122 kg)

Career information
- High school: Harry A. Burke
- College: Iowa State
- NFL draft: 1987: undrafted

Career history
- New Orleans Saints (1987)*; New York Jets (1987)
- * Offseason or practice squad member only
- Stats at Pro Football Reference

Vince Jasper (born November 30, 1964) is an American former professional football player who was an offensive lineman for the New York Jets of the National Football League (NFL) in 1987. He played college football for the Iowa State Cyclones.
