= Tracy Martin =

American football player (born 1964)

No. 86, 82
- Position: Wide receiver

Personal information
- Born: December 4, 1964 (age 61); Minneapolis, Minnesota, U.S.
- Listed height: 6 ft 3 in (1.91 m)
- Listed weight: 205 lb (93 kg)

Career information
- High school: Brooklyn Center (Brooklyn Center, Minnesota)
- College: North Dakota
- NFL draft: 1987: 6th round, 161st overall pick

Career history
- New York Jets (1987); Pittsburgh Steelers (1989)*; Green Bay Packers (1990)*; Saskatchewan Roughriders (1991); Green Bay Packers (1991)*; Minnesota Fighting Pike (1996)
- * Offseason or practice squad member only

Career NFL statistics
- Return yards: 180
- Stats at Pro Football Reference

Tracy Aaron Martin (born December 4, 1964) is an American former professional football player who was a wide receiver for the New York Jets of the National Football League (NFL). He played college football for the North Dakota Fighting Hawks. He was selected by the Jets in the sixth round of the 1987 NFL draft. He also played professionally for the Saskatchewan Roughriders of the Canadian Football League (CFL).
