= Johnny Hector =

American football player (born 1960)

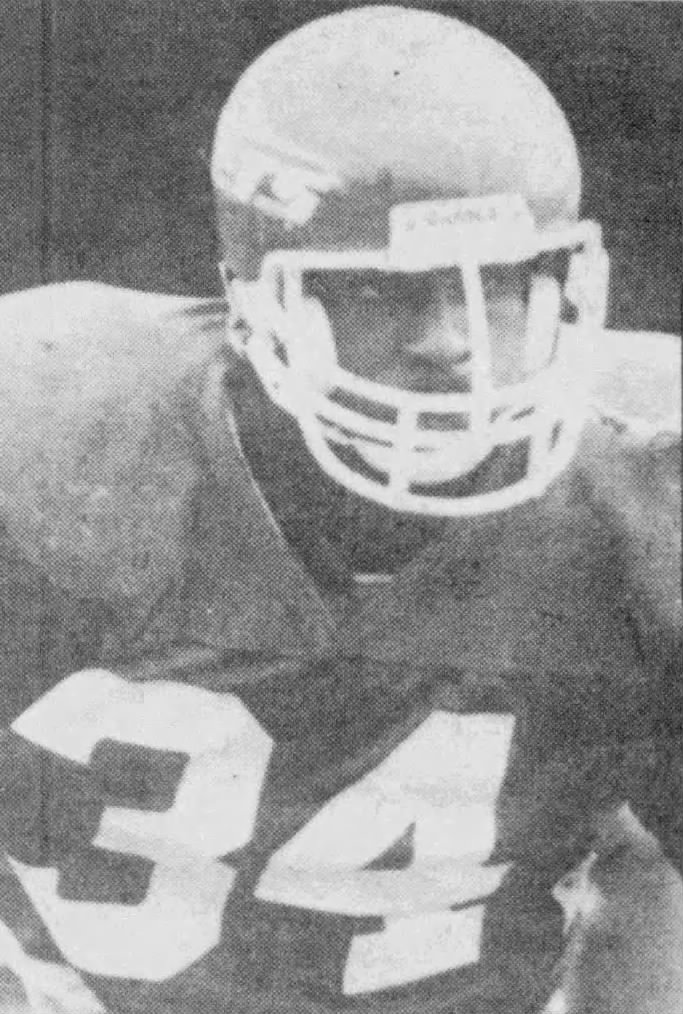
- Hector in 1987

No. 34
- Position: Running back

Personal information
- Born: November 26, 1960 (age 65); Lafayette, Louisiana, U.S.
- Listed height: 5 ft 11 in (1.80 m)
- Listed weight: 200 lb (91 kg)

Career information
- High school: New Iberia Senior (New Iberia, Louisiana)
- College: Texas A&M
- NFL draft: 1983: 2nd round, 51st overall pick

Career history
- New York Jets (1983–1992)

Awards and highlights
- NFL rushing touchdowns co-leader (1987)

Career NFL statistics
- Rushing yards: 4,280
- Rushing average: 4.1
- Rushing touchdowns: 41
- Stats at Pro Football Reference

Johnny Lyndell Hector (born November 26, 1960) is an American former professional football player for 10 seasons the New York Jets of the National Football League (NFL). He played college football for the Texas A&M Aggies and was selected 51st overall by the New York Jets in the second round of the 1983 NFL draft. Standing 5 ft 11 in (1.80 m) and 200 lbs., Hector played Jets from 1983 to 1992. His best season as a pro came during the 1987 season when he was tied with Charles White for most rushing touchdowns in the league with 11. During the mid to late 1980s, he served as a member of the 'Two-Headed Monster' backfield along with Freeman McNeil, creating a one-two punch at running back among the most potent in the league.

Hector compiled 4,280 rushing yards on 1,051 carries and 41 touchdowns; he also caught 188 passes for 1,661 yards and three touchdowns. His last NFL touchdown was against the New England Patriots on December 23, 1990.

He played high school football at New Iberia Senior High School in New Iberia, Louisiana and graduated in 1979. He lives in Lafayette, Louisiana with his wife, Karla.

== NFL career statistics ==
Legend
	Led the league
**Bold**	Career high

=== Regular season ===
Year	Team	Games		Rushing					Receiving				
Year	Team	GP	GS	Att	Yds	Avg	Lng	TD	Rec	Yds	Avg	Lng	TD
1983	NYJ	10	1	16	85	5.3	42	0	5	61	**12.2**	22	1
1984	NYJ	13	2	124	531	4.3	**64**	1	20	182	9.1	26	0
1985	NYJ	14	5	145	572	3.9	22	6	17	164	9.6	28	0
1986	NYJ	13	5	164	605	3.7	41	8	33	302	9.2	23	0
1987	NYJ	11	6	111	435	3.9	20	**11**	32	249	7.8	27	0
1988	NYJ	**16**	1	137	561	4.1	19	10	26	237	9.1	30	0
1989	NYJ	15	**9**	**177**	**702**	4.0	24	3	**38**	**330**	8.7	**32**	**2**
1990	NYJ	15	3	91	377	4.1	22	2	8	72	9.0	25	0
1991	NYJ	14	1	62	345	**5.6**	47	0	7	51	7.3	16	0
1992	NYJ	5	1	24	67	2.8	14	0	2	13	6.5	9	0
		126	34	1,051	4,280	4.1	64	41	188	1,661	8.8	32	3

=== Playoffs ===
Year	Team	Games		Rushing					Receiving				
Year	Team	GP	GS	Att	Yds	Avg	Lng	TD	Rec	Yds	Avg	Lng	TD
1985	NYJ	**1**	0	4	13	3.3	7	0	**1**	**11**	**11.0**	**11**	**1**
1991	NYJ	**1**	**1**	**11**	**43**	**3.9**	**8**	0	0	0	0.0	0	0
		2	1	15	56	3.7	8	0	1	11	11.0	11	1
