= Joe Walton =

American football player and coach (1935–2021)

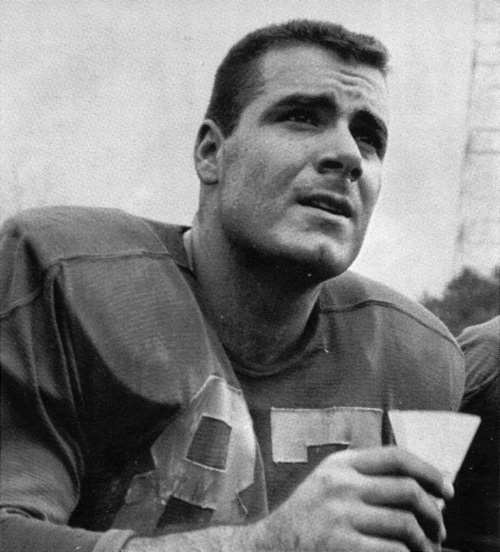
- Walton at Pittsburgh in 1956

No. 81, 80
- Positions: End, defensive end

Personal information
- Born: December 15, 1935; Beaver Falls, Pennsylvania, U.S.
- Died: August 15, 2021 (aged 85); Englewood, Florida, U.S.
- Listed height: 5 ft 11 in (1.80 m)
- Listed weight: 202 lb (92 kg)

Career information
- High school: Beaver Falls
- College: Pittsburgh (1953–1956)
- NFL draft: 1957: 2nd round, 14th overall pick

Career history

Playing
- Washington Redskins (1957–1960); New York Giants (1961–1963)

Coaching
- Westchester/Long Island Bulls (1967–1969) Assistant coach; New York Giants (1969–1973); Wide receivers coach (1969–1970); Offensive coordinator (1971–1973); Washington Redskins (1974–1980); Running backs coach (1974–1977); Offensive coordinator (1978–1980); New York Jets (1981–1989); Offensive coordinator (1981–1982); Head coach (1983–1989); Pittsburgh Steelers (1990–1991) Offensive coordinator; Robert Morris (1994–2013) Head coach

Operations
- New York Giants (1965–1968) Scout; New York Jets (1988–1989) General manager

Awards and highlights
- Unanimous All-American (1956); Second-team All-American (1955); 2× First-team All-Eastern (1955, 1956); 6× NEC champion (1996–2000, 2010)

Career NFL statistics
- Receptions: 178
- Receiving yards: 2,628
- Receiving touchdowns: 28
- Stats at Pro Football Reference

Head coaching record
- Regular season: 53–57 (.482)
- Postseason: 1–2 (.333)
- Career: NFL: 54–59 (.478); NCAA: 115–92 (.556)
- Coaching profile at Pro Football Reference
- Executive profile at Pro Football Reference

Joseph Frank Walton (December 15, 1935 – August 15, 2021) was an American professional football player and coach who retired after 20 years as the head coach and creator of the football program at Robert Morris University. Walton played eight seasons in the National Football League (NFL) as a pass catching tight end for the Redskins and Giants. He served as head coach of the New York Jets for seven seasons, guiding them to the playoffs twice. He also served as an assistant coach for the New York Giants, the Washington Redskins, the New York Jets and the Pittsburgh Steelers during a 20-year period.

== Early life and playing career ==
Walton was born in Beaver Falls, Pennsylvania, in 1935, the son of former Washington Redskins guard Frank "Tiger" Walton. Like his father, Walton was a football star at Beaver Falls High School; both also starred at the University of Pittsburgh before playing in the NFL for the Washington Redskins, followed by coaching the Redskins and Pittsburgh Steelers.

After initially enrolling at Indiana University Bloomington, Walton attended the University of Pittsburgh on a football scholarship. While there, Walton helped lead the Pittsburgh Panthers to the 1956 Sugar Bowl following the 1955 season and then to the 1956 Gator Bowl in his senior season. In 1955, his junior year Walton was selected an All-American. In 1956, he was named the co-captain of Pitt's team, was a unanimous selection as a first-team All-American and was named to the Academic All-American team.

Walton was selected in the second round with the 14th overall pick of the 1957 NFL draft by the Redskins and played with them from 1957 to 1960. In July 1961, he was involved in a three-team trade with the Redskins, Dallas Cowboys and New York Giants. The Giants received Walton and end Jim Podoley from the Redskins, the Redskins received Fred Dugan from the Cowboys and placekicker John Aveni, end Jerry Daniels, and defensive halfback Dave Whitsell from the Giants, and the Cowboys received placekicker Allen Green and a sixth round for the 1962 NFL draft from the Giants that the team later used to draft George Andrie. Walton played for the Giants from 1961 to 1963. He was placed on injured reserve due to shoulder and knee injures during the 1964 season. He announced his retirement as an active player on June 21, 1965.

Walton scored three touchdown catches as a TE in one game. He did so twice during the 1962 season: October 28, 1962 against Washington and December 16, 1962, against Dallas. Walton's record was tied on September 25, 2014, by Larry Donnell of the New York Giants. October 28, 1962, Walton also caught teammate quarterback Y. A. Tittle's single-game record-tying seventh touchdown pass.

== Coaching career ==
=== NFL ===
Walton began his NFL coaching career as a scout for the New York Giants (1965–1968), then transitioned to wide receivers coach (1969–1973). To gain coaching experience from George Allen he moved on to the Redskins as running backs coach (1974–1977) then offensive coordinator from 1978 to 1980. Walton moved to the New York Jets and served as offensive coordinator there for the 1981 and 1982 seasons. His work as offensive coordinator led the Jets to hand over the head-coaching position to him on February 10, 1983, when he succeeded Walt Michaels whose retirement had been announced the previous day. Walton served as the head coach of the New York Jets from 1983 to 1989 and his teams achieved a 53–57–1 record. He guided the Jets into the NFL postseason twice.

After the 1988 season, the Jets gave Walton a three-year extension deal. The 1989 season proved to be a nightmare for Walton and the Jets. They lost six of their first seven games of the season and never recovered on their way to a 4–12 finish (the worst record since 1980), with the last two home games being shutout losses. Fan discontent with the team led to chants of "Joe Must Go" that urged owner Leon Hess to fire him. On December 23, 1989 (three days after the final game), Walton and his staff was fired by Jets general manager Dick Steinberg, who had been hired to manage the team a week earlier. He was replaced by Bruce Coslet.

Walton was recruited by head coach Chuck Noll in 1990 to serve as the offensive coordinator for the Pittsburgh Steelers. He served for two years until Chuck Noll retired after the 1991 season. Walton's NFL protégés include Rich Kotite, Bud Carson, Joe Theismann, Fran Tarkenton, Norm Snead, Ken O'Brien and Richard Todd.

=== College ===
On July 27, 1993, Walton was named the head coach at Robert Morris University of its newly formed Colonials football team. He remained in this position until the conclusion of the 2013 season.

Walton was hired in 1993 to build the program from scratch. After posting 13 wins as an independent his first two years at the helm, Walton led the Colonials into NEC football in 1996 by winning the first of five consecutive conference championships. During the five-year run, Robert Morris posted a 39–13 overall record and 26–2 mark in league play, and recorded the only undefeated season in school history with a 10–0 mark in the 2000 campaign. The Colonials won back-to-back ECAC Bowls in 1996 and 1997, and were crowned NCAA I-AA non-scholarship national champions in both 1999 and 2000.

The Colonials would go on to win a sixth NEC title in 2010 and earn the first-ever FCS playoff bid for the conference. The winningest coach in NEC history, Walton retired with 114 career victories and a 74–47 record against conference opponents during his 20-year run. He was four times as NEC Coach of the Year (1996, 1997, 1999 and 2010), and was an Eddie Robinson Coach of the Year candidate in 2010.

Walton has also helped a fledgling program send three of its brightest stars to the National Football League (NFL). The program's running back Tim Hall (1994–95) was drafted by the Oakland Raiders in the sixth round (183rd player overall) of the 1996 NFL Draft. Hall played two years for the Oakland Raiders in 1996–97. Former offensive lineman Hank Fraley (1996–1999), a member of the NEC's first Hall of Fame induction class in 2010, spent 10 years in the NFL from 2000 to 2010 with the Philadelphia Eagles, the Cleveland Browns and the St. Louis Rams. Fraley has been Offensive Line coach for the Minnesota Vikings since 2015. Former defensive back Robb Butler played with the San Diego Chargers in 2004. Also to see time in NFL camps from Robert Morris under Walton include former wide receiver DeLonte Perkins (Green Bay Packers), former quarterback Tim Levcik (Miami Dolphins, Pittsburgh Steelers), AJ Dalton (Detroit Lions).

In 2005, Robert Morris University opened Joe Walton Stadium, the new home to the RMU Colonials. Walton's contract to remain the head coach at Robert Morris ran through 2013. In January 2012, RMU announced that Walton would retire at the end of the 2013 season, which would mark his 20th year as Robert Morris Head Coach, and assistant head coach and former Steelers defensive lineman John Banaszak would replace Walton upon his retirement.

== Personal life and honors ==
After returning to the Pittsburgh area in 1990 to coach for the Steelers, Walton moved back to his hometown Beaver Falls with his late wife, Ginger, who died in September 2007 after 47 years of marriage. They have two daughters, Jodi and Stacy, and one son, Joe and six grandchildren.

Walton lived in Beaver Falls with his wife Patty Sheehan Walton, whom he married December 10, 2011.

Since retiring from coaching, Walton was inducted into the RMU Athletic Hall of Fame in November 2013. Joe Theismann emceed the dinner banquet honoring Walton. He was named to the Northeast Conference 2013-14 Hall of Fame class and was the 2014 Recipient of the Bob Prince Award presented to him by Steeler Owner Dan Rooney at the Art Rooney Award Dinner in Pittsburgh in April 2014. Joe Walton was inducted into the Larry Bruno Foundation's Hall of Achievement in 2012.

He died on August 15, 2021, at age 85.

== Head coaching record ==
=== NFL ===
Team	Year	Regular season					Postseason			
Team	Year	Won	Lost	Ties	Win %	Finish	Won	Lost	Win %	Result
NYJ	1983	7	9	0	.438	5th in AFC East	-	-	-	
NYJ	1984	7	9	0	.438	3rd in AFC East	-	-	-	
NYJ	1985	11	5	0	.688	2nd in AFC East	0	1	.000	Lost to New England Patriots in AFC Wild Card Game
NYJ	1986	10	6	0	.625	2nd in AFC East	1	1	.500	Lost to Cleveland Browns in AFC Divisional Game
NYJ	1987	6	9	0	.400	5th in AFC East	-	-	-	
NYJ	1988	8	7	1	.531	4th in AFC East	-	-	-	
NYJ	1989	4	12	0	.250	5th in AFC East	-	-	-	
Total		53	57	1	.482		1	2	.333	

=== College ===
Year	Team	Overall	Conference	Standing	Bowl/playoffs
Robert Morris Colonials (NCAA Division I-AA independent) (1994–1995)
1994	Robert Morris	7–1–1			
1995	Robert Morris	6–4			
Robert Morris Colonials (Northeast Conference) (1996–2013)
1996	Robert Morris	9–2	3–1	T–1st	W ECAC Bowl
1997	Robert Morris	8–3	4–0	1st	W ECAC Bowl
1998	Robert Morris	4–6	4–1	T–1st	
1999	Robert Morris	8–2	7–0	1st	
2000	Robert Morris	10–0	8–0	1st	
2001	Robert Morris	6–3	6–1	2nd	
2002	Robert Morris	3–7	2–5	T–6th	
2003	Robert Morris	6–4	4–3	T–3rd	
2004	Robert Morris	6–5	3–4	T–4th	
2005	Robert Morris	2–8	1–6	8th	
2006	Robert Morris	7–4	5–2	T–2nd	
2007	Robert Morris	4–6	3–3	T–3rd	
2008	Robert Morris	5–6	4–3	T–3rd	
2009	Robert Morris	5–6	5–3	T–3rd	
2010	Robert Morris	8–3	7–1	T–1st	L NCAA Division I First Round
2011	Robert Morris	2–9	2–6	8th	
2012	Robert Morris	4–7	3–5	T–6th	
2013	Robert Morris	5–6	3–3	3rd	
Robert Morris:		115–92–1	74–47		
Total:		115–92–1			
National championship Conference title Conference division title or championship game berth
