= Greg Werner =

American football player (born 1966)

No. 80
- Position: Tight end

Personal information
- Born: October 21, 1966 (age 60); Batesville, Indiana, U.S.
- Listed height: 6 ft 4 in (1.93 m)
- Listed weight: 236 lb (107 kg)

Career information
- High school: Mount Vernon (Fortville, Indiana)
- College: DePauw
- NFL draft: 1989: undrafted

Career history
- New York Jets (1989); Philadelphia Eagles (1990)*
- * Offseason or practice squad member only

Career NFL statistics
- Receptions: 8
- Receiving yards: 115
- Stats at Pro Football Reference

Greg Werner (born October 21, 1966) is an American former professional football player who was a tight end in the National Football League (NFL). He played college football for the DePauw Tigers.

== College career ==
Werner played football and baseball at DePauw University. As senior, he caught 47 passes for 634 yards and nine touchdowns and was named an NCAA Division III All-American. He finished his collegiate career with 119 career pass receptions for 1,742 yards. Werner was inducted into the DePauw Athletic Hall of Fame in 2006.

== Professional career ==
Werner was signed by the New York Jets as an undrafted free agent in 1989. He was released and re-signed by the Jets multiple times during his rookie season. Werner finished the year with eight receptions for 115 yards in 10 games played. Werner was signed by the Philadelphia Eagles, but was cut at the end of training camp.

== Personal life ==
Werner's son, Pete Werner, played college football for the Ohio State Buckeyes and was selected by the New Orleans Saints in the 2021 NFL draft and another son, Dan, played at Harvard. Werner currently lives in Indianapolis, Indiana, and works as an orthodontist.
