= Darrell Davis =

American football player (born 1966)

No. 98, 56
- Position: Defensive end

Personal information
- Born: March 10, 1966 (age 60); Houston, Texas, U.S.
- Listed height: 6 ft 2 in (1.88 m)
- Listed weight: 258 lb (117 kg)

Career information
- High school: Midland (Midland, Texas)
- College: TCU
- NFL draft: 1990: 12th round, 306th overall pick

Career history
- New York Jets (1990–1991); Buffalo Bills (1992)*; Montreal Machine (1992)
- * Offseason or practice squad member only

Career NFL statistics
- Sacks: 6
- Fumble recoveries: 2
- Touchdowns: 1
- Stats at Pro Football Reference

Darrell Odell Davis (born March 10, 1966) is an American former professional football player who was a defensive end in the National Football League (NFL). He played for the New York Jets from 1990 to 1991. He played college football for the TCU Horned Frogs and was selected by the Jets in the 12th round of the 1990 NFL draft.
