= Walter Briggs (American football) =

American football player (born 1965)

No. 16
- Position: Quarterback

Personal information
- Born: August 6, 1965 (age 61); Elmira, New York, U.S.
- Listed height: 6 ft 1 in (1.85 m)
- Listed weight: 205 lb (93 kg)

Career information
- High school: Hackensack
- College: Montclair State
- NFL draft: 1987: undrafted

Career history
- New York Jets (1987)
- Stats at Pro Football Reference

Walter Robert Briggs (born August 6, 1965) is an American former professional football player who was a quarterback for the New York Jets of the National Football League (NFL). He played college football for the Montclair State Red Hawks.
