= Ken Johnson (defensive back) =

American football player (born 1966)

No. 22, 26
- Position: Defensive back

Personal information
- Born: September 14, 1966 (age 60); Thomaston, Georgia, U.S.
- Listed height: 6 ft 2 in (1.88 m)
- Listed weight: 203 lb (92 kg)

Career information
- High school: Robert E. Lee (Thomaston)
- College: Florida A&M
- NFL draft: 1989: undrafted

Career history
- Minnesota Vikings (1989–1990); New York Jets (1990)
- Stats at Pro Football Reference

Kenneth Lee Johnson (born September 14, 1966) is an American former professional football player who was a defensive back in the National Football League (NFL). He played college football for the Florida A&M Rattlers.

== Early years and education ==
Born in Thomaston, Georgia, he attended the Robert E. Lee Institute (GA) and Florida A&M University.

== Professional football ==
He entered the NFL in 1989 as an undrafted free agent, signing for the Minnesota Vikings. There he played under defensive backs coach Pete Carroll, appearing in one game during the 1989 season. He played four more games for the Vikings in 1990, but was cut after their week 4 game against the Tampa Bay Buccaneers before re-signing to their practice squad. On November 7, 1990, he was signed by the New York Jets, where Carroll was now defensive coordinator, as cover for the injured Brian Washington. He played four more games for the Jets, but these proved to be his final games in the NFL.
