= Lynwood Alford =

American football player (born 1963)

Profile
- Position: Linebacker

Personal information
- Born: August 22, 1963 (age 63); Aliquippa, Pennsylvania, U.S.

Career information
- College: Coffeyville (Kansas) JC; Syracuse
- NFL draft: 1987: undrafted

Career history
- New York Jets (1987)
- Stats at Pro Football Reference

Lynwood A. Alford (born August 22, 1963) is an American former professional football player who was a linebacker for the New York Jets of the National Football League (NFL). He played college football for the Syracuse Orange.

Alford grew up in Beaver Falls, Pennsylvania. His father, Lynwood Alford, Sr. (born January 1944 in Beaver Falls), was a close childhood friend of Beaver Falls native Joe Namath. Alford attended Aliquippa High School where he was a standout in football. After graduating from high school in 1981, he attended Coffeyville (Kansas) Junior College. In December 1982, he was offered a scholarship to play football at Syracuse University. He played for Syracuse from 1983 to 1985. He subsequently played with the New York Jets in 1987. After appearing in his first game in the NFL, Alford told The New York Times: "It was a dream come true. It was something that I'll never forget, something that I'll tell my grandchildren. I don't care if I was just on the kickoff return unit. I was in the game."
