= Eddie Hunter (American football) =

American football player (born 1965)

No. 45, 37
- Position: Running back

Personal information
- Born: January 20, 1965 (age 61); Reno, Nevada, U.S.
- Listed height: 5 ft 10 in (1.78 m)
- Listed weight: 205 lb (93 kg)

Career information
- High school: Bishop McNamara (Forestville, Maryland)
- College: Virginia Tech
- NFL draft: 1987: 8th round, 196th overall pick

Career history
- New York Jets (1987); Tampa Bay Buccaneers (1987); New York Jets (1988)*
- * Offseason or practice squad member only

Career NFL statistics
- Rushing yards: 210
- Rushing average: 3.8
- Total touchdowns: 2
- Stats at Pro Football Reference

Edward Lee Hunter (born January 20, 1965) is an American former professional football player who was a running back in the National Football League (NFL) for the New York Jets and Tampa Bay Buccaneers. He played college football for the Virginia Tech Hokies. 1986 Second Team All-South Independent
