= Joe Burke (American football) =

American football player (born 1961)

No. 29
- Position: Running back

Personal information
- Born: February 9, 1961 (age 65); Albany, New York
- Listed height: 6 ft 0 in (1.83 m)
- Listed weight: 200 lb (91 kg)

Career information
- High school: Bishop Maginn
- College: Rutgers
- NFL draft: 1983: undrafted

Career history
- New York Jets (1987)
- Stats at Pro Football Reference

Joseph Richard Burke (born February 9, 1961) is an American former professional football player who was a running back in the National Football League (NFL). He played for the New York Jets in 1987.
