= John Chirico =

American football player (born 1965)

No. 33
- Position: Running back

Personal information
- Born: August 15, 1965 (age 61); Brooklyn, New York, U.S.
- Listed height: 6 ft 0 in (1.83 m)
- Listed weight: 220 lb (100 kg)

Career information
- High school: Chaminade
- College: Columbia
- NFL draft: 1987: undrafted

Career history
- New York Jets (1987)

Career NFL statistics
- Rushing yards: 22
- Rushing average: 1.8
- Touchdowns: 1
- Stats at Pro Football Reference

John J. Chirico (born August 15, 1965) is an American former professional football player who was a running back for the New York Jets of the National Football League (NFL). He played college football for the Columbia Lions.
