= Nuu Faaola =

American football player (born 1964)

No. 30, 34
- Position: Running back

Personal information
- Born: January 15, 1964 (age 62); Honolulu, Hawaii, U.S.
- Listed height: 5 ft 11 in (1.80 m)
- Listed weight: 215 lb (98 kg)

Career information
- High school: Honolulu (HI) Farrington
- College: Hawaii
- NFL draft: 1986: 9th round, 245th overall pick

Career history
- New York Jets (1986–1989); Miami Dolphins (1989); Cleveland Browns (1990)*
- * Offseason or practice squad member only

Career NFL statistics
- Rushing yards: 71
- Rushing average: 3.6
- Touchdowns: 2
- Stats at Pro Football Reference

Nu'u Fa'aola (born January 15, 1964) is a Samoan-American former professional football running back who played in the National Football League (NFL) from 1986 to 1989. He played for the New York Jets and Miami Dolphins primarily on special teams after playing collegiately at the University of Hawaiʻi at Mānoa. Fa'aola attended Farrington High School in Honolulu, Hawai'i. He was originally a ninth round draft selection for the Jets in the 1986 NFL draft.

== In media ==
During his playing days he dated future Miss America Carolyn Sapp, starred in a 1991 autobiographical television movie, Miss America: Behind the Crown which depicted her as the victim of physical abuse at Faaola's hands. Records indicate she filed a police report against him and obtained a restraining order in October 1990 (Good Housekeeping magazine, Sept. 1992.)
