= Guy Bingham =

Japanese-born American football player (born 1958)

No. 64, 65, 57
- Positions: Center, long snapper

Personal information
- Born: February 25, 1958 (age 68); Gunma Ken, Japan
- Listed height: 6 ft 3 in (1.91 m)
- Listed weight: 255 lb (116 kg)

Career information
- High school: J. M. Weatherwax (Aberdeen, Washington)
- College: Montana
- NFL draft: 1980: 10th round, 260th overall pick

Career history
- New York Jets (1980–1988); Atlanta Falcons (1989–1991); Washington Redskins (1992–1993)

Career NFL statistics
- Games played: 199
- Games started: 32
- Fumble recoveries: 3
- Stats at Pro Football Reference

Guy Richard Bingham (born February 25, 1958) is a Japanese-born former professional American football center and long snapper who played in the National Football League (NFL) for the New York Jets, Atlanta Falcons and Washington Redskins. He played college football for the Montana Grizzlies and was selected 260th overall by the Jets in the tenth round of the 1980 NFL draft.

Bingham attended and played high school football at J. M. Weatherwax High School in Aberdeen, Washington. On September 25, 2009, he donated back a football to J. M. Weatherwax High School during halftime at the high school's football game. The football was signed by him and his teammates when he played with the New York Jets. Bingham and former NFL player Mark Bruener, who also graduated from J. M. Weatherwax, were made honorary captains at this game.
