= Larry Pasquale =

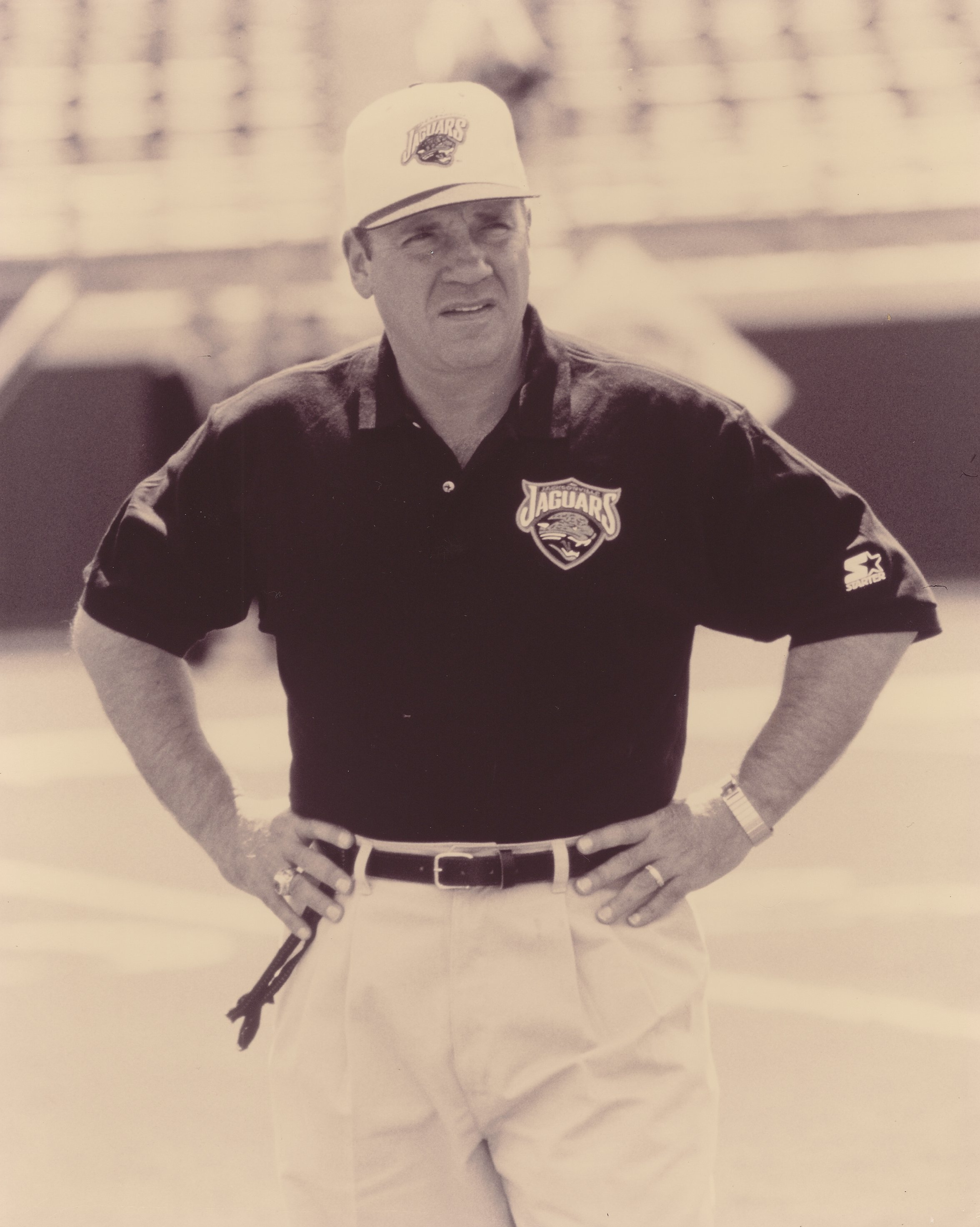
- Pasquale with Jaguars

Personal information
- Born: April 21, 1941 (age 85); Brooklyn, New York, U.S.

Career information
- High school: Lafayette
- College: Bridgeport

Career history
- Montreal Alouettes (1977–1978) Special teams coordinator; Detroit Lions (1979) Special teams coordinator; New York Jets (1980–1989) Special teams coordinator; San Diego Chargers (1990–1991) Special teams coordinator; Philadelphia Eagles (1992–1994) Special teams coordinator; Jacksonville Jaguars (1995–1999) Special teams coordinator; St. Louis Rams (2000) Special teams coordinator

Larry Pasquale (born April 21, 1941) is a former American and Canadian football coach, and sports broadcaster. His 39-year football coaching career included jobs with multiple teams in the National Football League (NFL), Canadian Football League (CFL), and several college and high school football teams. During his career, he was regarded as one of the most respected special teams coaches in the NFL, earning Special Teams Coach of the Year Honors. After retiring from coaching, Pasquale enjoyed an eight-year career as a television and radio sports broadcaster.

== Early life ==
Larry Joseph Pasquale was born on April 21, 1941, in Brooklyn, New York. As a child, he grew up in Brooklyn with his parents, Mary Teresa and Joseph Pasquale. Mary immigrated to Brooklyn as a child from Sicily, Italy.

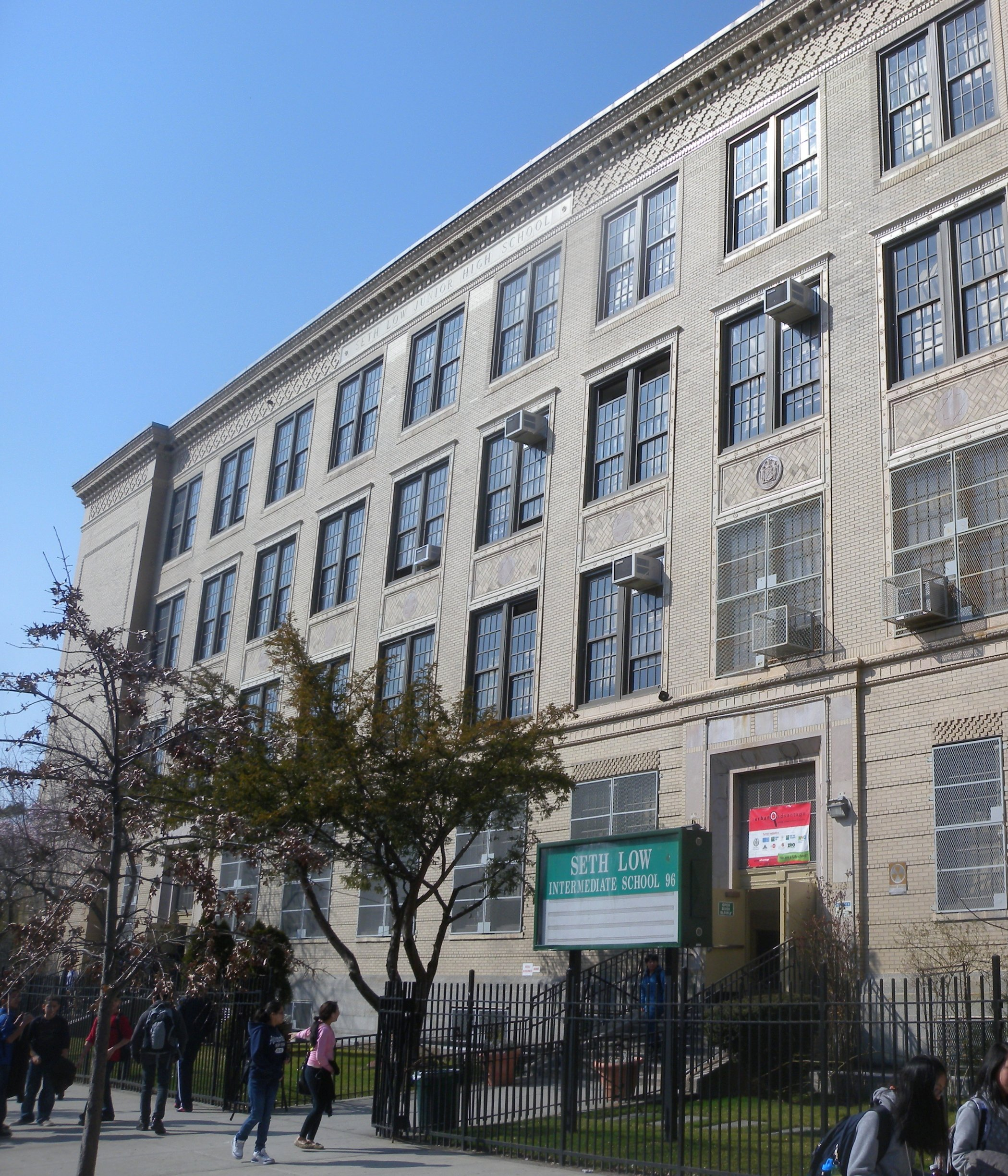
Seth Low Jr High

Pasquale attended PS 97, Seth Low Junior High School, and Lafayette High School. He played football in high school, where he earned First-Team All-City High School Quarterback honors. After graduating from Lafayette HS in 1958, he attended Georgia Military College Prep School and the University of Bridgeport in Connecticut. Pasquale majored in Physical Education. At Bridgeport, he earned both Bachelor and Master of Science Degrees. He also completed post-graduate courses at Columbia University and Fairfield University.

== Career ==
=== Early Coaching and Collegiate career ===
Pasquale began his coaching career at age 22 and served as a multi-sport high school coach in Chappaqua, NY, Greenwich, CT and Danbury, CT. He advanced to a college football coaching career with positions at Slippery Rock University, Boston University, the U.S. Naval Academy, University of Massachusetts Amherst and Idaho State University.

=== Professional Football ===
Pasquale's first professional coaching job was for the Montreal Alouettes under head coach Marv Levy; the Alouettes won the CFL's top prize, the Grey Cup, in 1977. In 1979, he began a 22-year NFL coaching career, with jobs for the Detroit Lions, New York Jets, San Diego Chargers, Philadelphia Eagles, Jacksonville Jaguars, and the St. Louis Rams.

=== Career highlights ===
Pasquale was named NFL Special Teams Coach of the Year in 1990 and was nominated for the award again in 1995 and 1997. He coached in the AFC Championship Game in 1983, 1997, and 2000. In five seasons with the Jaguars, his special teams unit scored ten touchdowns while only giving up only one in the regular season, and his special teams blocked 11 punts in his five years. While Pasquale coached the St. Louis Rams' special teams in 2000, Rams kicker Jeff Wilkins was perfect on field goals and extra points, and the Rams led the league in kickoff touchbacks. Also that season, punt returner Az-Zahir Hakim's punt return average led the NFC. While coaching the Jets, Pasquale had the NFL's number one ranked punt-coverage teams in 1981, 1986, 1987, and 1988 and were ranked second in 1989. In 1984, the Jets also ranked #1 in kick-off return team. Pasquale led the Jets to an 80 percent success rate on fake field goals and fake punts, while never allowing an opponent to convert a faked kick. Pasquale coached San Diego Chargers' special teams to the top of the NFL in kickoff return average and punt coverage in his first season. During that season, Pasquale turned around a 27th ranked unit to first in the top four special teams categories (kick-off, kick-off return, punt and punt return).

Pasquale's special teams scored more than 40 touchdowns in his career while allowing only 4 blocked punts. Pasquale was a favorite of filmmaker NFL Films for his motivational speeches, which frequently made appearances in NFL Films' highlight videos.

Pasquale was a co-founder of the NFL Coaches' Association that helped bring better pension and health benefits for NFL assistant coaches, and instituted an interim pension plan (Rule of 75) which provided coverage for coaches from ages 58–65 based on years of service to the league.

=== Broadcasting career ===
After retiring from coaching, Pasquale began a broadcasting career as an analyst for the New York Jets on MSG Radio (2001–2002) and then served as an analyst for This Week in Football on the YES network for seven seasons. Pasquale's "Coach's Class" video segment and weekly Jets and New York Giants game plan columns also appeared on YESNetwork.com.

=== Personal life ===
Pasquale married lifelong educator Joann Evelyn Freudendorf in Brooklyn on April 4, 1964. Together they moved 22 times as he advanced through his football coaching career. They have three children: Lisa Pasquale Semmes, Darrell Pasquale and Lauren Pasquale Bartlett, and seven grandchildren. The couple currently resides in Ponte Vedra, Florida.
