= Ted Banker =

American football player (born 1961)

No. 63, 68
- Positions: Guard, tackle

Personal information
- Born: February 17, 1961 (age 65); Millstadt, Illinois, U.S.
- Listed height: 6 ft 2 in (1.88 m)
- Listed weight: 270 lb (122 kg)

Career information
- High school: Althoff (Belleville, Illinois)
- College: Southeast Missouri State
- NFL draft: 1983: undrafted

Career history
- New York Jets (1983–1988); Cleveland Browns (1989–1990)

Career NFL statistics
- Games played: 75
- Games started: 50
- Fumble recoveries: 2
- Stats at Pro Football Reference

Theodore William Banker (born February 17, 1961) is an American former professional football player who was a guard in the National Football League (NFL) for six seasons for the Cleveland Browns and New York Jets.

Banker played college football at Southeast Missouri State, where he was a four-year letterman in football. He won all MIAA honors and was team captain for 1981 and 1982, and was team MVP in 1982.

Banker played in the NFL as an offensive lineman for six years — five with the Jets and one with the Browns.

Banker is the only player in NFL history to play at all five offensive line positions in the same season (center, left and right offensive guard, left and right offensive tackle).
