= Anthony Corvino =

American football player (born 1965)

No. 67
- Position: Guard/Tackle

Personal information
- Born: September 15, 1965 (age 61); Beacon Falls, Connecticut, U.S.
- Listed height: 6 ft 1 in (1.85 m)
- Listed weight: 262 lb (119 kg)

Career information
- High school: H. Frank Carey (Franklin Square, New York)
- College: Southern Connecticut State
- NFL draft: 1987: undrafted

Career history
- New York Jets (1987); Brooklyn Mariners (1988); Detroit Drive (1989); Washington Commandos (1990); Connecticut Coyotes (1995)

Awards and highlights
- ArenaBowl champion (1989)

Career NFL statistics
- Games played: 2
- Stats at Pro Football Reference

Career AFL statistics
- Games played: 8
- Sacks: 1
- Stats at ArenaFan.com

Anthony F. Corvino (born September 15, 1965) is an American former professional football player who was a guard and tackle for one season with the New York Jets of the National Football League (NFL). He played college football for the Southern Connecticut State Owls. Corvino also played professionally for three three seasons in the Arena Football League (AFL) with the Detroit Drive, Washington Commandos, and Connecticut Coyotes.

== Early life and education ==
Corvino was born on September 15, 1965, in Beacon Falls, Connecticut. He attended H. Frank Carey Junior-Senior High School in Franklin Square, New York, graduating in 1983. He committed to Southern Connecticut State University, attending the school for four years: from 1983 to 1986. He was named All-New England as a senior and also lettered in lacrosse.

== Professional career ==
After graduating, Corvino was signed by the New York Jets as an undrafted free agent during the 1987 NFL strike. He was a replacement player, and appeared in two games as a substitute. He wore number 67, and played tackle and guard. He was released at the end of the strike.

In 1988, he played for the semi-professional Brooklyn Mariners. They played the Racine Raiders in the national semi-pro championship, (Note: Also called the "Semi-Pro Super Bowl.") losing 3–5.

Corvino returned to the professional ranks in 1989, playing for the Detroit Drive of the Arena Football League (AFL). He appeared in two games as they won the Arena championship game. He left the Drive in 1990 for the Washington Commandos. With the Commandos, he appeared in just one game, making one sack.

After spending five years out of professional football, Corvino returned in 1995 with the Connecticut Coyotes in the Arena League, making the final roster. He played in five total games with them, making 5.5 tackles.
