= Scott Holman (American football) =

American football player (born 1962)

No. 82, 80
- Position: Wide receiver

Personal information
- Born: September 27, 1962 (age 64); Portland, Oregon, U.S.
- Listed height: 6 ft 2 in (1.88 m)
- Listed weight: 195 lb (88 kg)

Career information
- High school: Beaverton (Beaverton, Oregon)
- College: Oregon
- NFL draft: 1986: undrafted

Career history
- St. Louis Cardinals (1986); New York Jets (1987)

Career NFL statistics
- Receptions: 18
- Receiving yards: 196
- Stats at Pro Football Reference

Scott Huntington Holman (born September 27, 1962) is an American former wide receiver in the National Football League (NFL).

== College career ==
Holman played for the Oregon Ducks and was a starter as a junior and senior. He finished his collegiate career with 48 receptions for 782 yards and four touchdowns.

== Professional career ==
Holman was signed by the St. Louis Cardinals in 1986 as an undrafted free agent. He was cut at the end of training camp, but was later re-signed by the team after injuries to the Cardinals receiving corps. Holman played in three games with one start before being waived a second time, catching three passes for 41 yards. In 1987, Holman was signed by the New York Jets in the off season but was originally cut during training camp. He was re-signed by the Jets as a replacement player during the 1987 NFL players strike. Holman had 15 receptions for 155 yards in three games and was released by the Jets when the strike ended.

== Personal ==
Holman's son, Berkeley, was a wide receiver for Northwestern.
