= Dave Cadigan =

American football player (born 1965)

No. 66, 68
- Positions: Tackle, guard

Personal information
- Born: April 6, 1965 (age 61); Needham, Massachusetts, U.S.
- Listed height: 6 ft 4 in (1.93 m)
- Listed weight: 280 lb (127 kg)

Career information
- High school: Newport Harbor (Newport Beach, California)
- College: USC
- NFL draft: 1988: 1st round, 8th overall pick

Career history
- New York Jets (1988–1993); Cincinnati Bengals (1994)

Awards and highlights
- Consensus All-American (1987); First-team All-Pac-10 (1987); Second-team All-Pac-10 (1986)

Career NFL statistics
- Games played: 82
- Games started: 64
- Fumble recoveries: 1
- Stats at Pro Football Reference

David Patrick Cadigan (born April 6, 1965) is an American former professional football player who was an offensive tackle in the National Football League (NFL).

== Early life ==
Cadigan was born in Needham, Massachusetts. He prepped at Newport Harbor High School in Newport Beach, California.

== College career ==
Cadigan was selected in 1988 in the first round with the eighth overall pick from the University of Southern California.

== Professional career ==
Cadigan played for the New York Jets between 1988 and 1993 and for the Cincinnati Bengals in 1994.
