= Don Baldwin (American football) =

American football player (born 1964)

No. 74, 75, 79, 97
- Position: Defensive end

Personal information
- Born: July 9, 1964 (age 62); St. Charles, Missouri, U.S.
- Listed height: 6 ft 3 in (1.91 m)
- Listed weight: 263 lb (119 kg)

Career information
- High school: St. Charles West (St. Charles, Missouri)
- College: Purdue
- NFL draft: 1986: undrafted

Career history
- New York Jets (1986–1987); Toronto Argonauts (1988–1989); Ottawa Rough Riders (1989)
- Stats at Pro Football Reference

Donald Wayne Baldwin (born July 9, 1964) is an American former professional football player who was a defensive end for the New York Jets of the National Football League (NFL) as well as the Toronto Argonauts and the Ottawa Rough Riders of the Canadian Football League (CFL). He played college football for the Purdue Boilermakers.

== College football career ==
Baldwin played at Purdue University for the Boilermakers from 1982 to 1985.

== Professional football career ==
=== New York Jets ===
Baldwin played eight games with the New York Jets in 1987, as a defensive tackle.

The 1987 NFL season was affected by a strike for four weeks, with Week 3 games not being played and Weeks 4–6 games being played using replacement players. However, some players chose to "cross the picket line" and play during the strike anyway. Baldwin crossed the picket line for the Week 6 game, a matchup against the Miami Dolphins which the Jets won 37–31.

=== Toronto Argonauts ===
==== 1988 season ====
Baldwin played five games with the Toronto Argonauts in 1988, his most prolific season in the Canadian Football League. He made five tackles, five sacks, and one interception, as well as recovered two of the opposing team's fumbles.

==== 1989 season ====
Baldwin only played two games with the Argonauts in 1989 before switching teams.

=== Ottawa Rough Riders ===
At some point during the 1989 season, Baldwin joined the Ottawa Rough Riders. He played three games with the team that season.
