= Kevin McArthur =

American football player (born 1962)

No. 57
- Position: Linebacker

Personal information
- Born: May 11, 1962 (age 64); Cameron, Louisiana, U.S.
- Listed height: 6 ft 2 in (1.88 m)
- Listed weight: 244 lb (111 kg)

Career information
- High school: Lake Charles (Lake Charles, Louisiana)
- College: Lamar
- NFL draft: 1984: undrafted

Career history
- Los Angeles Raiders (1984)*; New York Jets (1984–1989); Montreal Machine (1992)
- * Offseason or practice squad member only

Career NFL statistics
- Sacks: 3
- Interceptions: 1
- Stats at Pro Football Reference

Kevin Lee McArthur (born May 11, 1962) is an American former professional football player who was a linebacker for the New York Jets of the National Football League. He played college football for the Lamar Cardinals. He is a member of Omega Psi Phi.
