= George Radachowsky =

American football player (born 1962)

No. 21, 25
- Positions: Safety, cornerback

Personal information
- Born: September 7, 1962 (age 64); Danbury, Connecticut, U.S.
- Listed height: 5 ft 11 in (1.80 m)
- Listed weight: 186 lb (84 kg)

Career information
- High school: Danbury
- College: Boston College (1980–1983)
- NFL draft: 1984: 7th round, 188th overall pick

Career history
- Los Angeles Rams (1984)*; Indianapolis Colts (1984–1985); New York Jets (1987–1989); San Diego Chargers (1991)*
- * Offseason or practice squad member only

Awards and highlights
- First-team All-ECAC (1983); Second-team All-East (1983)

Career NFL statistics
- Interceptions: 2
- Sacks: 1.5
- Touchdowns: 1
- Stats at Pro Football Reference

George Joseph Radachowsky Jr. (born September 7, 1962) is an American former professional football player who was a defensive back for five seasons in the National Football League (NFL) with the Indianapolis Colts and New York Jets. He was selected by the Los Angeles Rams in the seventh round of the 1984 NFL draft after playing college football for the Boston College Eagles.

== Early life ==
George Joseph Radachowsky Jr. was born on September 7, 1962, in Danbury, Connecticut. He attended Rogers Park Junior High School for ninth grade. He then attended Danbury High School and was a three-year letterman in football, basketball, and baseball. He was also a team captain in all three sports his senior year. He earned All-State, All-Area, and All-County honors in football. Radachowsky was inducted into the Danbury High School Hall of Fame in 2018.

== College career ==
Radachowsky was a four-year letterman for the Eagles at Boston College from 1980 to 1983. He recorded one interception as a freshman in 1980. He returned seven interceptions for 51 yards in 1981 while also returning four kickoffs for 74 yards and three punts for two yards, garnering Associated Press (AP) honorable mention All-East recognition. His seven interceptions were tied for third-most in the country in 1981. He totaled 57 tackles, two interceptions, and five punt returns for 65 yards in 1982. Radachowsky accumulated 39 tackles, four interceptions, and ten pass deflections his senior year in 1983, earning AP second-team All-East and first-team All-ECAC accolades. He played in the East-West Shrine Game after his senior season.

Radachowsky also played baseball for the Eagles during his sophomore and junior years, and was the team's starting center fielder. He graduated from Boston College with a Bachelor of Science in marketing in 1984, and was inducted into the school's Varsity Club Hall of Fame in 2010.

== Professional career ==
Radachowsky was selected by the Los Angeles Rams in the seventh round, with the 188th overall pick, of the 1984 NFL draft. He officially signed with the team on July 9.

On August 27, 1984, he was traded to the Indianapolis Colts for a 1985 eleventh round draft pick, which the Rams used to select Doug Flutie, who Radachowsky played with at Boston College. Radachowsky played in all 16 games for the Colts during his rookie year in 1984. He appeared in three games in 1985 before being placed on injured reserve on September 30, 1985. He re-signed with the Colts on April 1, 1986, before being released on August 18, 1986.

Radachowsky signed with the New York Jets on May 10, 1987. He was released on August 31, re-signed on September 24, released again on October 26, re-signed again on October 28, released again on November 3, and finally re-signed again on November 27. Overall, he played in eight games, starting three, for the Jets during the 1987 season and recorded two interceptions for 45 yards. He played in nine games, starting three, for the Jets the next year in 1988, totaling 1.5 sacks. He was released on September 4, 1989, but re-signed the next day. Radachowsky appeared in all 16 games, starting a career-high 12, in 1989 and returned a blocked field goal 78 yards for a touchdown. He was later released on August 27, 1990.

Radachowsky was signed by the San Diego Chargers on March 30, 1991, but released later that year.

== Personal life ==
Radachowsky ran for Danbury City Council in 2023 but was not elected.
