= Tom Baldwin (American football) =

American football player (1961–2000)

No. 95
- Position: Defensive lineman

Personal information
- Born: May 13, 1961; Evergreen Park, Illinois, U.S.
- Died: May 2, 2000 (aged 38); Naperville, Illinois, U.S.
- Listed height: 6 ft 4 in (1.93 m)
- Listed weight: 274 lb (124 kg)

Career information
- High school: Thornton Fractional South (Lansing, Illinois)
- College: Wisconsin, Tulsa
- NFL draft: 1984: 9th round, 234th overall pick

Career history
- New York Jets (1984–1988); Detroit Lions (1989)*
- * Offseason or practice squad member only

Career NFL statistics
- Fumble recoveries: 2
- Sacks: 3.5
- Touchdowns: 1
- Stats at Pro Football Reference

Thomas Burke Baldwin (May 13, 1961 – May 2, 2000) was an American professional football defensive lineman in the National Football League (NFL). He was selected by the New York Jets in the ninth round of the 1984 NFL draft out of Tulsa. He played four seasons for the Jets.
