= Roger Vick =

American football player (born 1964)

No. 43, 49
- Position: Fullback

Personal information
- Born: August 11, 1964 (age 62); Conroe, Texas, U.S.
- Listed height: 6 ft 3 in (1.91 m)
- Listed weight: 232 lb (105 kg)

Career information
- High school: Tomball (Tomball, Texas)
- College: Texas A&M
- NFL draft: 1987: 1st round, 21st overall pick

Career history
- New York Jets (1987–1989); Philadelphia Eagles (1990); Orlando Thunder (1992)

Awards and highlights
- First-team All-SWC (1986)

Career NFL statistics
- Rushing yards: 1,289
- Average: 3.9
- Touchdowns: 10
- Stats at Pro Football Reference

Roger Hamilton Vick (born August 11, 1964) is an American former professional football player who was a fullback in the National Football League (NFL) for the New York Jets and Philadelphia Eagles from 1987 to 1990. He played college football for the Texas A&M Aggies. He also played on the Orlando Thunder in the World League of American Football (WLAF).

== College career statistics ==
Legend
**Bold**	Career high

Year	Team	Games	Rushing				Receiving			
Year	Team	GP	Att	Yds	Avg	TD	Rec	Yds	Avg	TD
1983	Texas A&M	8	91	425	**4.7**	2	5	36	7.2	0
1984	Texas A&M	**11**	91	322	3.5	3	13	98	7.5	0
1985	Texas A&M	**11**	171	764	4.5	8	10	**160**	**16.0**	**2**
1986	Texas A&M	10	**220**	**960**	4.4	**10**	**20**	128	6.4	0
		40	573	2,471	4.3	23	48	422	8.8	2

== NFL career ==
Pre-draft measurables
Height	Weight	Arm length	Hand span	40-yard dash	10-yard split	20-yard split	20-yard shuttle	Vertical jump	Broad jump	Bench press
6 ft 2 1/2 in (1.89 m)	223 lb (101 kg)	31 in (0.79 m)	10 1/2 in (0.27 m)	4.61 s	1.58 s	2.69 s	4.25 s	34.0 in (0.86 m)	9 ft 11 in (3.02 m)	12 reps
All values from the NFL Combine

Vick was the second fullback selected in the first round of the 1987 NFL draft, after Alonzo Highsmith who was drafted third overall by the Houston Oilers. The selection of Vick is a notable moment in draft history, primarily due to the audible outburst of despair made by a fan in attendance.

Pete Rozelle: "The New York Jets' first round selection, fullback-"
Unnamed fan: "OH NO!"
Rozelle: "Roger Vick, Texas A&M"

— NFL Commissioner Pete Rozelle announcing Vick's selection in the 1987 draft

Vick's best season came in 1988 when he rushed for 540 yards on 128 carries (4.2 YPC) and three touchdowns. He also had 19 catches for 120 yards that season.
