= Jamie Kurisko =

American football player (born 1961)

No. 82
- Position: Tight end

Personal information
- Born: December 22, 1963 (age 62); Nyack, New York, U.S.
- Listed height: 6 ft 4 in (1.93 m)
- Listed weight: 236 lb (107 kg)

Career information
- High school: Nanuet (Nanuet, New York)
- College: Southern Connecticut State
- NFL draft: 1987: undrafted

Career history
- New York Jets (1987–1988)

Career NFL statistics
- Games played: 3
- Stats at Pro Football Reference

Jamie A. Kurisko (born December 22, 1963) is an American former professional football player who was a tight end for the New York Jets of the National Football League (NFL). He played college football for the Southern Connecticut State Owls.
