= Onzy Elam =

American football player (born 1964)

No. 52, 53
- Position: Linebacker

Personal information
- Born: December 1, 1964 (age 61); Miami, Florida, U.S.
- Listed height: 6 ft 2 in (1.88 m)
- Listed weight: 225 lb (102 kg)

Career information
- High school: Miami Northwestern
- College: Tennessee State (1982–1986)
- NFL draft: 1987: 3rd round, 75th overall pick

Career history
- New York Jets (1987–1988); Washington Redskins (1989)*; Dallas Cowboys (1989)
- * Offseason or practice squad member only
- Stats at Pro Football Reference

Onzy Warren Elam (born December 1, 1964) is an American former professional football linebacker who played three seasons in the National Football League (NFL) with the New York Jets and Dallas Cowboys. He was selected by the Jets in the third round of the 1987 NFL draft after playing college football at Tennessee State University.

== Early life and college ==
Onzy Warren Elam was born on December 1, 1964, in Miami, Florida. He attended Miami Northwestern Senior High School in Miami.

Elam played college football for the Tennessee State Tigers of Tennessee State University. He was redshirted in 1982 as a strong safety. He converted to linebacker in 1983 and was a four-year letterman from 1983 to 1986. Elam was inducted into the school's athletics hall of fame in 2024.

== Professional career ==
Pre-draft measurables
Height	Weight	Arm length	Hand span	40-yard dash	10-yard split	20-yard split	20-yard shuttle	Vertical jump	Broad jump	Bench press
6 ft 1 3/4 in (1.87 m)	216 lb (98 kg)	30 3/4 in (0.78 m)	9 in (0.23 m)	4.71 s	1.63 s	2.73 s	4.35 s	29.5 in (0.75 m)	9 ft 2 in (2.79 m)	19 reps
All values from NFL Combine

Elam was selected by the New York Jets in the third round, with the 75th overall pick, of the 1987 NFL draft. He officially signed with the team on July 23. He played in five games for the Jets during the 1987 season. Elam appeared in four games in 1988 before being placed on injured reserve on October 4, 1988. He became a free agent after the season.

Elam signed with the Washington Redskins on February 22, 1989. He was released on August 29, 1989.

Elam was signed by the Dallas Cowboys on September 27, 1989. He played in one game for the Cowboys before being released on October 3, 1989.
