= Bobby Humphery =

American football player (born 1961)

No. 84, 48, 44, 39
- Positions: Cornerback, wide receiver

Personal information
- Born: August 23, 1961 (age 65); Lubbock, Texas, U.S.
- Listed height: 5 ft 10 in (1.78 m)
- Listed weight: 178 lb (81 kg)

Career information
- High school: Estacado (Lubbock, Texas)
- College: New Mexico State
- NFL draft: 1983: 9th round, 247th overall pick

Career history
- New York Jets (1984–1989); Los Angeles Rams (1990); San Diego Chargers (1991)*; San Antonio Riders (1992); Sacramento Gold Miners (1993–1994); San Antonio Texans (1995)
- * Offseason or practice squad member only

Awards and highlights
- 1984 PFW: 1st Team All-Conf.; Pro Football Writers: 1st Team All-NFL; PFW: 1st Team All-NFL; Sporting News: 1st Team All-NFL

Career NFL statistics
- Interceptions: 5
- Fumble recoveries: 15
- Touchdowns: 5
- Stats at Pro Football Reference

Robert Charles Humphery (born August 23, 1961) is an American former professional football player who played cornerback for seven seasons in the NFL. He also played in the WLAF and CFL. He was selected by the New York Jets in the ninth round (247th overall) of the 1983 NFL Draft.
