= Alex Gordon (gridiron football) =

American gridiron football player (born 1964)

No. 55, 58, 96
- Position: Linebacker

Personal information
- Born: September 14, 1964 (age 62); Jacksonville, Florida, U.S.
- Listed height: 6 ft 5 in (1.96 m)
- Listed weight: 246 lb (112 kg)

Career information
- High school: Englewood (Jacksonville)
- College: Cincinnati
- NFL draft: 1987: 2nd round, 42nd overall pick

Career history
- New York Jets (1987–1989); Los Angeles Raiders (1990); Cincinnati Bengals (1991–1993); Memphis Mad Dogs (1995); Toronto Argonauts (1996)

Awards and highlights
- Grey Cup champion (1996); PFWA All-Rookie Team (1987)

Career NFL statistics
- Sacks: 12
- Fumble recoveries: 4
- Interceptions: 1
- Stats at Pro Football Reference

Alex Groncier Gordon (born September 14, 1964) is an American former professional football player who was a linebacker who played in the National Football League (NFL) from 1987 through 1993. He played college football for the Cincinnati Bearcats. Gordon was initiated into the Omega Psi Phi fraternity at Cincinnati, through the Psi Theta chapter.

Pre-draft measurables
Height	Weight	Arm length	Hand span	40-yard dash	10-yard split	20-yard split	20-yard shuttle	Vertical jump	Broad jump	Bench press
6 ft 4 3/4 in (1.95 m)	239 lb (108 kg)	34 in (0.86 m)	9 3/4 in (0.25 m)	4.85 s	1.68 s	2.80 s	4.62 s	29.0 in (0.74 m)	9 ft 7 in (2.92 m)	13 reps
All values from NFL Combine

According to an August 1987 Sports Illustrated article, Chicago Bears coach Mike Ditka wanted to draft Gordon in the first round (No. 26 overall) in the 1987 NFL draft. However, Ditka was overruled by the Bears' front office, which instead selected Michigan quarterback Jim Harbaugh. The Jets selected Gordon in the second round with the 42nd overall pick that year.

In 1995, Gordon began playing in the Canadian Football League (CFL) for the U.S. expansion Memphis Mad Dogs. In that one season, he led the team with 61 tackles and 7 sacks.

In 1996, after the Mad Dogs folded, he was selected by the Toronto Argonauts during the dispersal draft. He went on to win the 84th Grey Cup with the Argonauts that season.
