= Paul Frase =

American football player (born 1965)

No. 91, 97, 95
- Positions: Defensive tackle, defensive end

Personal information
- Born: May 5, 1965 (age 61); Elmira, New York, U.S.
- Listed height: 6 ft 5 in (1.96 m)
- Listed weight: 267 lb (121 kg)

Career information
- High school: Spaulding (Rochester, New Hampshire)
- College: Syracuse
- NFL draft: 1988: 6th round, 146th overall pick
- Expansion draft: 1995: 9th round, 17th overall pick

Career history
- New York Jets (1988–1994); Jacksonville Jaguars (1995–1996); Green Bay Packers (1997); Baltimore Ravens (1998)

Awards and highlights
- Second-team All-East (1987)

Career NFL statistics
- Tackles: 232
- Sacks: 11
- Fumble recoveries: 3
- Stats at Pro Football Reference

Paul Frase (born May 5, 1965) is an American former professional football player who played in the National Football League (NFL) for 11 seasons, from 1988 to 1998. He grew up in Barrington, New Hampshire and studied psychology at Syracuse University. Frase played with the New York Jets (1988–1994, where his teammates honored him with the Ed Block Courage Award), the Jacksonville Jaguars (1995–1996), Green Bay Packers (1997), and the Baltimore Ravens (1998). Frase was selected by the Jets in the sixth round of the 1988 NFL draft with the 146th overall pick.

During the 1995 season, Frase received the Ed Block Courage Award for an unprecedented second time in the award's 18-year history. He was selected by the Jacksonville Jaguars in the 1995 NFL expansion draft.

== Personal life ==
Paul Frase married Alison Rockett-Frase in 1992, and have had two children.

Frase, along with his wife, founded Joshua Frase Foundation in 1996. The foundation was named after their son Joshua, who had Myotubular myopathy and lived to the age of 15. Frase released a book, ''Game Changer" in 2023 about his experiences.

Frase now lives Jacksonville, Florida.
