= Michael Harper (gridiron football) =

American gridiron football player (born 1961)

No. 88, 84
- Position: Wide receiver

Personal information
- Born: May 11, 1961 (age 65); Kansas City, Missouri, U.S.
- Listed height: 5 ft 10 in (1.78 m)
- Listed weight: 180 lb (82 kg)

Career information
- High school: Hickman Mills (MO)
- College: USC
- NFL draft: 1984: 11th round, 293rd overall pick

Career history
- Los Angeles Rams (1984)*; Calgary Stampeders (1984–1985); Los Angeles Rams (1985)*; New York Jets (1986–1989)
- * Offseason or practice squad member only

Career NFL statistics
- Receptions: 25
- Receiving yards: 352
- Receiving touchdowns: 1
- Stats at Pro Football Reference

Michael Harper (born May 11, 1961) is an American former professional football player who was a wide receiver in the National Football League (NFL) for the New York Jets and in the Canadian Football League (NFL) for the Calgary Stampeders. Harper played college football for the USC Trojans.
