= Kerry Glenn =

American football player (born 1962)

No. 35
- Position: Cornerback

Personal information
- Born: January 3, 1962 (age 64); East St. Louis, Illinois, U.S.
- Listed height: 5 ft 9 in (1.75 m)
- Listed weight: 175 lb (79 kg)

Career information
- High school: East St. Louis
- College: Minnesota
- NFL draft: 1985: 10th round, 262nd overall pick

Career history
- New York Jets (1985–1988); Cleveland Browns (1989)*; New York Jets (1989); Miami Dolphins (1990–1992)
- * Offseason or practice squad member only

Career NFL statistics
- Interceptions: 7
- Fumble recoveries: 3
- Sacks: 2
- Stats at Pro Football Reference

Kerry Raymond Glenn (born January 3, 1962) is an American former professional football player who was a cornerback for eight seasons with the New York Jets and Miami Dolphins in the National Football League (NFL). He played college football for the Minnesota Golden Gophers and was selected by the Jets in the 10th round of the 1985 NFL draft. He was a Pro Bowl alternate in 1991 for special teams.
