= Dan Alexander (offensive lineman) =

American football player (born 1955)

No. 60
- Positions: Guard, tackle

Personal information
- Born: June 17, 1955 (age 71); Houston, Texas, U.S.
- Listed height: 6 ft 4 in (1.93 m)
- Listed weight: 260 lb (118 kg)

Career information
- High school: Lamar (Houston)
- College: LSU
- NFL draft: 1977: 8th round, 200th overall pick

Career history
- New York Jets (1977–1989)

Career NFL statistics
- Games played: 192
- Games started: 183
- Fumble recoveries: 5
- Stats at Pro Football Reference

Daniel Lamarr Alexander (born June 17, 1955) is an American former professional football player who was an offensive tackle and guard for 13 seasons with the New York Jets of the National Football League (NFL). Alexander played college football for the LSU Tigers and was selected 200th overall in the eighth round of the 1977 NFL draft.

Alexander played his entire 13-year NFL career with the Jets, seeing action in 192 games, in which he started 183.
