= Gerald Nichols =

American football player (born 1964)

No. 77, 74, 93
- Position: Defensive tackle

Personal information
- Born: February 10, 1964 (age 62); St. Louis, Missouri, U.S.
- Listed height: 6 ft 2 in (1.88 m)
- Listed weight: 261 lb (118 kg)

Career information
- High school: Hazelwood East (Spanish Lake, Missouri)
- College: Florida State
- NFL draft: 1987: 7th round, 187th overall pick

Career history
- New York Jets (1987–1990); Tampa Bay Buccaneers (1991); Miami Dolphins (1992)*; Philadelphia Eagles (1993); Washington Redskins (1993); London Monarchs (1995)
- * Offseason or practice squad member only

Career NFL statistics
- Sacks: 12.5
- Fumble recoveries: 1
- Stats at Pro Football Reference

Gerald William Nichols (born February 10, 1964) is an American former professional football player who was a defensive lineman in the National Football League (NFL) for the New York Jets, Tampa Bay Buccaneers, Philadelphia Eagles, and Washington Redskins. He played college football for the Florida State Seminoles and was selected in the seventh round of the 1987 NFL draft. He lives in Sarasota, Florida and is retired from the National Football League. He was a 1985 Second team All-South independent football, 1986 First Team All-South Independent football selection
