= Troy Benson =

American football player (born 1963)

No. 54
- Position: Linebacker

Personal information
- Born: July 30, 1963 (age 63); Altoona, Pennsylvania, U.S.
- Listed height: 6 ft 2 in (1.88 m)
- Listed weight: 235 lb (107 kg)

Career information
- High school: Altoona Area
- College: Pittsburgh
- NFL draft: 1985: 5th round, 120th overall pick

Career history
- New York Jets (1985–1990)

Awards and highlights
- First-team All-East (1984)

Career NFL statistics
- Sacks: 2
- Interceptions: 1
- Fumble recoveries: 1
- Stats at Pro Football Reference

Troy B. Benson (born July 30, 1963) is an American former professional football player who was a linebacker for six seasons with the New York Jets of the National Football League (NFL). He played college football for the Pittsburgh Panthers and was selected by the Jets in the fifth round of the 1985 NFL draft. He is the younger brother of former New York Giants tackle Brad Benson.
