= 1986 New York Jets season =

1986 season of NFL team New York Jets

- Owner: Leon Hess
- Head coach: Joe Walton
- Offensive coordinator: Rich Kotite
- Defensive coordinator: Bud Carson
- Home stadium: Giants Stadium

Results
- Record: 10–6
- Division place: 2nd AFC East
- Playoffs: Won Wild Card Playoffs (vs. Chiefs) 35–15; Lost Divisional Playoffs (at Browns) 20–23 (2OT)
- Pro Bowlers: TE Mickey Shuler; WR Al Toon

The 1986 New York Jets season was the 27th season for the team and the seventeenth in the National Football League. It began with the team trying to improve upon its 11–5 record from 1985 and return to the playoffs under head coach Joe Walton. The Jets finished the season with a record of 10–6, qualifying for the top Wild Card spot in the playoffs despite losing their last five games of the season. They defeated the Kansas City Chiefs 35–15 in the wild-card round, but lost to the Cleveland Browns in the divisional round. The loss to the Browns is infamous in Jets history. Leading 20–10 in the 4th quarter, the Jets collapsed when Mark Gastineau hammered Browns quarterback Bernie Kosar seconds after he released a pass; Gastineau was flagged for roughing the passer and the Browns rallied to force overtime and win 23–20 early in the game's second overtime.

The week-3 game against Miami was memorable as Ken O'Brien and Dolphins quarterback Dan Marino fought a wild shootout that culminated in the Jets winning 51–45 in overtime. Marino threw for 448 yards and six TD passes while O'Brien accumulated 479 yards, four touchdowns, and one interception for what would statistically be the best game of his career.

After 11 games, the Jets were 10-1, and the New York Giants were 9-2, with many thinking there would be an all-New York Super Bowl for the first time. The Giants would indeed go on to finish 14–2 and win Super Bowl XXI.

== Offseason ==
=== NFL draft ===
1986 New York Jets draft
Round	Pick	Player	Position	College	Notes
1	22	Mike Haight	OT	Iowa	
2	49	Doug Williams	Tackle	Texas A&M	
3	79	Tim Crawford	LB	Texas Tech	
4	105	Rogers Alexander	LB	Penn State	
5	132	Ron Hadley	LB	Washington	
7	189	Bob White	Tackle	Rhode Island	
8	215	Robert Ducksworth	DB	Southern Miss	
9	245	Nuu Faaola	RB	Hawaii	
10	272	Carl Carr	LB	North Carolina	
11	299	Vince Amoia	RB	Arizona State	
12	328	Sal Cesario	Tackle	Cal Poly	
Made roster † Pro Football Hall of Fame * Made at least one Pro Bowl during career

== Roster ==
1986 New York Jets roster
Quarterbacks (QB): 7 Ken O'Brien; 10 Pat Ryan; Running backs (RB): 31 Marion Barber; 30 Nuu Faaola; 34 Johnny Hector; 24 Freeman McNeil; 49 Tony Paige; Wide receivers (WR): 84 Michael Harper; 87 Kurt Sohn; 88 Al Toon; 83 Jo-Jo Townsell; 85 Wesley Walker; Tight ends (TE): 81 Billy Griggs; 89 Rocky Klever; 82 Mickey Shuler	Offensive linemen (OL): 60 Dan Alexander G; 63 Ted Banker G; 64 Guy Bingham C; 65 Joe Fields C; 79 Mike Haight G; 72 Gordon King T; 53 Jim Sweeney T; Defensive linemen (DL): 95 Tom Baldwin NT; 78 Barry Bennett DE; 98 Jerome Foster DE; 93 Marty Lyons DE; 74 Derland Moore NT; 76 Ben Rudolph DE	Linebackers (LB): 54 Troy Benson ILB; 59 Kyle Clifton ILB; 50 Bob Crable OLB; 94 Rusty Guilbeau OLB; 55 Charles Jackson OLB; 57 Kevin McArthur ILB; 58 Matt Monger OLB; Defensive backs (DB): 27 Russell Carter CB; 39 Harry Hamilton FS; 47 Jerry Holmes CB; 28 Carl Howard CB; 48 Bobby Humphery CB; 26 Lester Lyles SS; 29 Johnny Lynn FS; 36 Rich Miano SS; Special teams (ST): 13 Dave Jennings P; 5 Pat Leahy K	Reserve: 43 Vince Amoia RB (IR); 52 Tim Crawford LB (IR); 99 Mark Gastineau DE (IR); 73 Joe Klecko NT (IR); 35 Kerry Glenn CB (IR); 80 Lam Jones WR (IR); 68 Reggie McElroy T (IR); 56 Lance Mehl LB (IR); 21 Kirk Springs S (IR); Rookies in italics

=== Depth chart ===
Defense
1986 New York Jets roster

FS
Harry Hamilton
Johnny Lynn

WLB	ILB	ILB	SLB
Bob Crable	Lance Mehl	Kyle Clifton	⋅
⋅	⋅	⋅	⋅

SS
Lester Lyles
⋅

CB
Jerry Holmes
⋅

DE	NT	DE
Barry Bennett	Joe Klecko	Marty Lyons
Mark Gastineau	Tom Baldwin	⋅

CB
Russell Carter
⋅

Offense
1986 New York Jets roster

WR
Al Toon
⋅

LT	LG	C	RG	RT
Jim Sweeney	Ted Banker	Joe Fields	Dan Alexander	Reggie McElroy
⋅	⋅	Guy Bingham	⋅	Gordon King

TE
Mickey Shuler
Rocky Klever

WR
Wesley Walker
⋅

QB
Ken O'Brien
⋅

RB
Freeman McNeil
Johnny Hector

FB
Tony Paige
⋅

Special teams
PK Pat Leahy
P Dave Jennings
KR Bobby Humphery
PR Kurt Sohn

== Schedule ==
=== Regular season ===
Week	Date	Opponent	Result	Record	Venue	Attendance
1	September 7	at **Buffalo Bills**	**W** 28–24	1–0	Rich Stadium	79,951
2	September 11	**New England Patriots**	**L** 6–20	1–1	Giants Stadium	72,422
3	September 21	**Miami Dolphins**	**W** 51–45 (OT)	2–1	Giants Stadium	71,025
4	September 28	at **Indianapolis Colts**	**W** 26–7	3–1	Hoosier Dome	56,075
5	October 5	**Buffalo Bills**	**W** 14–13	4–1	Giants Stadium	69,504
6	October 12	at **New England Patriots**	**W** 31–24	5–1	Sullivan Stadium	60,342
7	October 20	Denver Broncos	**W** 22–10	6–1	Giants Stadium	73,759
8	October 26	New Orleans Saints	**W** 28–23	7–1	Giants Stadium	44,246
9	November 2	at Seattle Seahawks	**W** 38–7	8–1	Kingdome	62,497
10	November 9	at Atlanta Falcons	**W** 28–14	9–1	Atlanta–Fulton County Stadium	53,476
11	November 16	**Indianapolis Colts**	**W** 31–16	10–1	Giants Stadium	65,149
12	November 24	at **Miami Dolphins**	**L** 3–45	10–2	Miami Orange Bowl	70,206
13	November 30	Los Angeles Rams	**L** 3–17	10–3	Giants Stadium	70,539
14	December 7	at San Francisco 49ers	**L** 10–24	10–4	Candlestick Park	58,091
15	December 13	Pittsburgh Steelers	**L** 24–45	10–5	Giants Stadium	58,044
16	December 21	at Cincinnati Bengals	**L** 21–52	10–6	Riverfront Stadium	51,619
Note: Intra-division opponents are in **bold** text.

=== Game summaries ===
==== Week 1 at Buffalo Bills ====
New York Jets (0–0) at Buffalo Bills (0–0)

Quarter	1	2	3	4	Total
Jets	7	7	0	14	**28**
Bills	7	3	0	14	**24**

at Rich Stadium • Orchard Park, New York

- Date: September 7
- Game time: 4:00 p.m. EDT
- Game weather: 56 °F (13.3 °C) • Wind 12 miles per hour (19 km/h; 10 kn)
- Game attendance: 79,951
- Referee: Jerry Markbreit
- TV announcers (NBC): Marv Albert and Bob Griese
- Pro-Football-Reference.com

Game information

Jets

- Ken O'Brien
  18/25, 318 Yds, 2 TD
- Freeman McNeil
  21 Rush, 72 Yds
- Al Toon
  6 Rec, 119 Yds, TD

Bills

- Jim Kelly
  20/33, 292 Yds, 3 TD
- Greg Bell
  17 Rush, 44 Yds
- Andre Reed
  5 Rec, 95 Yds, TD

The Jets spoiled the debut of Bills quarterback Jim Kelly.

Scoring summary

Quarter	Time	Drive			Team	Scoring information	Score	
Quarter	Time	Plays	Yards	TOP	Team	Scoring information	NYJ	BUF
1	8:55				Bills	Bell 2-yard touchdown reception from Kelly, Norwood kick good	0	7
1	6:14				Jets	Paige 2-yard touchdown run, Leahy kick good	7	7
2	3:51				Jets	Toon 46-yard touchdown reception from O'Brien, Leahy kick good	14	7
2	3:05				Bills	19-yard field goal by Norwood	14	10
4	14:00				Bills	Reed 55-yard touchdown reception from Kelly, Norwood kick good	14	17
4	9:58				Jets	Hector 1-yard touchdown run, Leahy kick good	21	17
4	5:24				Jets	Walker 71-yard touchdown reception from O'Brien, Leahy kick good	28	17
4	3:55				Bills	Metzelaars 4-yard touchdown reception from Kelly, Norwood kick good	28	24
"TOP" = time of possession. For other American football terms, see Glossary of American football.							28	24

==== Week 2: vs. New England Patriots ====
The NFL scheduled the Jets to host the Patriots in a rare Thursday night game. The Jets were limited to two field goals as Tony Collins caught two touchdowns in a 20–6 Jets loss where the two teams combined for just 486 yards of offense.

==== Week 3 vs. Dolphins ====
Week Three: Miami Dolphins (1–1) at New York Jets (1–1)

Quarter	1	2	3	4	OT	Total
Dolphins	7	14	17	7	0	**45**
**Jets**	3	28	0	14	6	**51**

at Giants Stadium, East Rutherford, New Jersey

- Date: September 21
- Game time: 1:00 p.m. EST
- Game weather: 69 °F (21 °C)
- Game attendance: 71,025
- Referee: Pat Haggerty
- TV announcers (NBC): Dick Enberg & Merlin Olsen
- Box Score, Box Score

Game information

First quarter

- NYJ – Pat Leahy 32-yard field goal, 4:29. Jets 3–0.
- MIA – James Pruitt 6-yard pass from Dan Marino (Fuad Reveiz kick), 2:36. Dolphins 7–3.

Second quarter

- NYJ – Johnny Hector 1-yard run (Pat Leahy kick), 12:09. Jets 10–7.
- NYJ – Johnny Hector 8-yard run (Pat Leahy kick), 10:00. Jets 17–7.
- MIA – Dan Johnson 1-yard pass from Dan Marino (Fuad Reveiz kick), 7:26. Jets 17–14.
- MIA – Mark Duper 13-yard pass from Dan Marino (Fuad Reveiz kick), 5:06. Dolphins 21–17.
- NYJ – Wesley Walker 65-yard pass from Ken O'Brien (Pat Leahy kick), 3:12. Jets 24–21.
- NYJ – Wesley Walker 50-yard pass from Ken O'Brien (Pat Leahy kick), 0:34. Jets 31–21.

Third quarter

- MIA – Mark Duper 46-yard pass from Dan Marino (Fuad Reveiz kick), 10:48. Jets 31–28.
- MIA – Fuad Reveiz 44-yard field goal, 7:12. Tie 31–31.
- MIA – Bruce Hardy 1-yard pass from Dan Marino (Fuad Reveiz kick), 4:12. Dolphins 38–31.

Fourth quarter

- NYJ – Dennis Bligen 7-yard run (Pat Leahy kick), 8:42. Tie 38–38.
- MIA – Mark Clayton 4-yard pass from Dan Marino (Fuad Reveiz kick), 2:56. Dolphins 45–38.
- NYJ – Wesley Walker 21-yard pass from Ken O'Brien (Pat Leahy kick), 0:00. Tie 45–45.

Overtime

- NYJ – Wesley Walker 43-yard pass from Ken O'Brien, 12:25. Jets 51–45.

Top passers

- MIA – Dan Marino – 30/50, 448 Yds, 6 TD, 2 INT
- NYJ – Ken O'Brien – 29/43, 479 Yds, 4 TD, INT

Top rushers

- MIA – Tony Nathan – 4 Rush, 36 Yds
- NYJ – Johnny Hector – 22 Rush, 82 Yds, 2 TD

Top receivers

- MIA – Mark Clayton – 8 Rec, 174 Yds, TD
- NYJ – Wesley Walker – 6 Rec, 194 Yds, 4 TD

The Jets-Dolphins rivalry reached an apex in this week-3 matchup as Ken O'Brien and Dan Marino unleashed ten combined touchdowns, the last a 43-yard score to Wesley Walker and a 51–45 overtime win for the Jets.

==== Week 4: at Indianapolis Colts ====
The two teams combined for six fumbles and three interceptions as Pat Leahy booted four field goals and Ken O'Brien had a touchdown throw for the Jets’ 26–7 win.

==== Week 5: vs. Buffalo Bills ====
The Jets limited Jim Kelly to 211 yards, one touchdown, and one interception as Mickey Shuler caught the winning 36-yard touchdown for a 14–13 New York win.

==== Week 6: at New England Patriots ====
Johnny Hector and Steve Grogan had memorable performances as the Jets raced to a 24–0 halftime lead. Subbing for injured Tony Eason, Grogan stormed the Patriots back in the second half with three touchdowns and a career-high 401 passing yards. Hector, with a career-high 143 rushing yards, also scored three times, and in the final minute Grogan completed a deep pass to Irving Fryar, but Fryar fumbled to the Jets, ending a 31–24 Jets win.

==== Week 7: Monday Night Football at Denver Broncos ====
The two teams used four quarterbacks (John Elway, Gary Kubiak, Ken O'Brien, and Pat Ryan) and combined for ten quarterback sacks, 22 penalties (for 172 yards), and just 490 yards of offense as the Jets ran away with a 22–10 win.

==== Week 8: vs. New Orleans Saints ====
Despite being shut out 17–0 in the fourth quarter, the Jets beat the Saints 28–23. Al Toon caught three touchdowns against his son's future team and Freeman McNeil added a fourth score. The Jets grabbed three fumbles and picked off the Saints twice.

==== Week 9: at Seattle Seahawks ====
Gale Gilbert was intercepted twice as the Jets crushed the Seahawks 38–7. Ken O'Brien threw for 431 yards and four touchdowns as the Jets put up 553 yards of offense.

==== Week 10: at Atlanta Falcons ====
Three Ken O'Brien touchdowns in the second quarter were enough to upend the Falcons in a 28–14 final. O'Brien and Falcons quarterback David Archer combined for 672 passing yards.

==== Week 11: vs. Indianapolis Colts ====
The Jets picked off Jack Trudeau four times and won 31–16, their ninth straight win putting them at a seemingly commanding 10–1.

==== Week 12: Monday Night Football at Miami Dolphins ====
Mounting injuries for the Jets had steadily weakened the club and the repercussions began in a 45–3 massacre by the Dolphins in Miami. Dan Marino tossed four touchdowns and Lorenzo Hampton blasted to 188 all-purpose yards and three scores. Ken O'Brien completed just 11 of 21 passes with an interception, and Pat Ryan took over under center but was picked off himself; the Jets also fumbled twice.

==== Week 13: vs. LA Rams ====
Three years after the infamous set-to between Jackie Slater and Mark Gastineau the Rams returned to The Meadowlands and won 17–3. Despite 350 yards of offense the Jets managed the one field goal while coughing up four turnovers and committing eight penalties to one Rams foul.

==== Week 14: at San Francisco 49ers ====
Four Niners backs (including ex-Buffalo Bill Joe Cribbs) rushed for 198 yards and three scores as the Niners won 24–10, knocking the Jets to 10–4.

==== Week 15 vs. Steelers ====
Week Fifteen: Pittsburgh Steelers (5–9) at New York Jets (10–4)

Quarter	1	2	3	4	Total
**Steelers**	0	17	0	28	**45**
Jets	0	14	3	7	**24**

at Giants Stadium, East Rutherford, New Jersey

- Date: December 13, 1986
- Game time: 12:30 PM EST
- Game weather: Clear, 32 °F (0 °C)
- Game attendance: 58,044
- Referee: Dick Hantak
- TV announcers (NBC): Dick Enberg & Merlin Olsen
- Pro-Football-Reference.com, The Football Database

Game information

**First quarter** No Scoring **Second quarter**

- PIT – Walter Abercrombie 1-yard run (Gary Anderson kick), 12:10. Steelers 7–0. Drive:
- NYJ – Jo-Jo Townsell 93-yard kickoff return (Pat Leahy kick), 11:54. Tie 7–7.
- PIT – Gary Anderson 36-yard field goal, 9:07. Steelers 10–7. Drive:
- PIT – Walter Abercrombie 7-yard pass from Mark Malone (Gary Anderson kick), 1:54. Steelers 17–7. Drive:
- NYJ – Kurt Sohn 24-yard pass from Ken O'Brien (Pat Leahy kick), 0:14. Steelers 17–14. Drive:

**Third quarter**

- NYJ – Pat Leahy 18-yard field goal, 9:04. Tie 17–17. Drive:

**Fourth quarter**

- PIT – Mark Malone 1-yard run (Gary Anderson kick), 11:11. Steelers 24–17. Drive:
- PIT – John Stallworth 40-yard pass from Mark Malone (Gary Anderson kick), 7:48. Steelers 31–17. Drive:
- PIT – Lupe Sanchez 67-yard interception return (Gary Anderson kick), 6:00. Steelers 38–17.
- NYJ – Mickey Shuler 5-yard pass from Pat Ryan (Pat Leahy kick), 2:47. Steelers 38–24. Drive:
- PIT – Walter Abercrombie 1-yard run (Gary Anderson kick), 0:37. Steelers 45–24. Drive:

Top passers

- PIT – Mark Malone – 16/27, 189 yards, 2 TD, INT
- NYJ – Ken O'Brien – 20/30, 197 yards, TD, 3 INT

Top rushers

- PIT – Earnest Jackson – 23 rushes, 101 yards
- NYJ – Freeman McNeil – 23 rushes, 137 yards

Top receivers

- PIT – John Stallworth – 5 receptions, 94 yards, TD
- NYJ – Mickey Shuler – 8 receptions, 69 yards, TD

In a Saturday NFL doubleheader with the Broncos–Redskins game following, the Jets hosted the Steelers and were buried 45–24. Ken O'Brien and Pat Ryan combined for 262 yards and two touchdowns but were intercepted three times as five Steelers backs rushed for 175 yards and three touchdowns.

==== Week 16: at Cincinnati Bengals ====
The AFC East slipped away from the Jets as they were crushed 52–21 by the Bengals. Boomer Esiason exploded to five touchdowns as the Jets had to settle for a wildcard playoff spot.

== Postseason ==
Round	Date	Opponent (seed)	Result	Venue	Attendance
Wild Card	December 28	Kansas City Chiefs (5)	W 35–15	Giants Stadium	69,307
Divisional	January 3, 1987	at Cleveland Browns (1)	L 20–23 (2OT)	Cleveland Municipal Stadium	78,106

=== AFC Wild Card Playoffs ===
Wild Card vs Kansas City Chiefs

Quarter	1	2	3	4	Total
Chiefs	6	0	0	9	15
Jets	7	14	7	7	35

at Giants Stadium, East Rutherford, New Jersey

- Date: December 28, 1986
- Game time: 12:30 p.m. EST
- Game attendance: 75,212
- Referee: Red Cashion
- TV announcers (NBC): Marv Albert and Bob Griese
- Scoring
  - KC – Smith 1 run (kick failed)
  - NYJ – McNeil 4 run (Leahy kick)
  - NYJ – McNeil 1 pass from Ryan (Leahy kick)
  - NYJ – Toon 11 pass from Ryan (Leahy kick)
  - NYJ – McArthur 21 interception return (Leahy kick)
  - KC – Lewis recovered blocked punt in end zone (Lowery kick)
  - NYJ – Griggs 6 pass from Ryan (Leahy kick)
  - KC – Safety, Jennings ran out of end zone

=== AFC Divisional Playoff ===
Cleveland Browns 23, New York Jets 20 (2OT)

Quarter	1	2	3	4	OT	2OT	Total
Jets	7	3	3	7	0	0	20
Browns	7	3	0	10	0	3	23

at Cleveland Stadium, Cleveland, Ohio

- Game time: 12:30 p.m. EST
- Game attendance: 79,720
- Referee: Ben Dreith
- TV announcers (NBC): Don Criqui and Bob Trumpy

== Standings ==
AFC East
	W	L	T	PCT	DIV	CONF	PF	PA	STK
^{(3)} New England Patriots	11	5	0	.688	7–1	8–4	412	307	W1
^{(4)} New York Jets	10	6	0	.625	6–2	8–4	364	386	L5
Miami Dolphins	8	8	0	.500	5–3	6–6	430	405	L1
Buffalo Bills	4	12	0	.250	1–7	3–11	287	348	L3
Indianapolis Colts	3	13	0	.188	1–7	2–10	229	400	W3
