= 1985 New York Jets season =

1985 season of NFL team New York Jets

- Owner: Leon Hess
- General manager: Jim Kensil
- Head coach: Joe Walton
- Offensive coordinator: Rich Kotite
- Defensive coordinator: Bud Carson
- Home stadium: Giants Stadium

Results
- Record: 11–5
- Division place: 2nd AFC East
- Playoffs: Lost Wild Card Playoffs (vs. Patriots) 14–26
- Pro Bowlers: QB Ken O'Brien; RB Freeman McNeil; DT Joe Klecko; DE Mark Gastineau; LB Lance Mehl

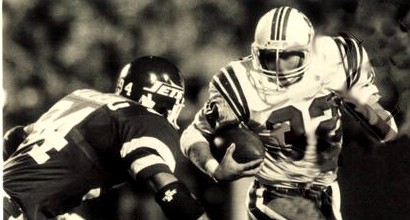
The Jets playing against the New England Patriots in week 7

The 1985 New York Jets season was the 26th season for the team and the 16th in the National Football League. It began with the team trying to improve upon its 7–9 record from 1984 under head coach Joe Walton. Among quarterbacks, Ken O'Brien had the lowest rate of interceptions, with only eight interceptions in 488 passing attempts. The Jets finished the season with a record of 11–5, qualifying for the top Wild Card spot in the playoffs. On October 14, during a Monday Night Halftime ceremony, the Jets retired Joe Namath's number 12, and helped inspire the Jets to a 23–7 victory over the Dolphins. In the Wild Card round of the playoffs, they fell at home to the eventual AFC champion New England Patriots 26–14.

NFL Films produced a documentary about the team's season entitled Just The Beginning; it was narrated by Jeff Kaye.

== Offseason ==
=== Draft ===
1985 New York Jets draft
Round	Pick	Player	Position	College	Notes
1	10	Al Toon *	Wide receiver	Wisconsin	
2	40	Lester Lyles	Cornerback	Virginia	
3	67	Donnie Elder	Cornerback	Memphis State	
4	94	Doug Allen	Wide receiver	Arizona State	
5	120	Troy Benson	Linebacker	Pittsburgh	
5	124	Brian Luft	Defensive tackle	USC	
5	134	Tony Smith	Wide receiver	San Jose State	
Made roster † Pro Football Hall of Fame * Made at least one Pro Bowl during career

== Personnel ==
=== Staff ===
1985 New York Jets staff
Front office: Owner – Leon Hess; President/general manager – Jim Kensil; Head coaches: Head coach – Joe Walton; Offensive coaches: Offensive coordinator – Rich Kotite; Quarterbacks – Zeke Bratkowski; Running backs – Bobby Hammond; Offensive line – Bill Austin	Defensive coaches: Defensive coordinator – Bud Carson; Linebackers – Dan Radakovich; Linebackers – Mike Faulkiner; Special teams coaches: Special teams – Larry Pasquale

=== Roster ===
1985 New York Jets roster
Quarterbacks (QB): 7 Ken O'Brien; 10 Pat Ryan; Running backs (RB): 23 Dennis Bligen; 34 Johnny Hector; 24 Freeman McNeil; 49 Tony Paige FB; Wide receivers (WR): 84 Bobby Humphery; 87 Kurt Sohn; 88 Al Toon; 83 Jo-Jo Townsell; 85 Wesley Walker; Tight ends (TE): 81 Billy Griggs; 89 Rocky Klever; 82 Mickey Shuler	Offensive linemen (OL): 60 Dan Alexander G; 63 Ted Banker G/T; 64 Guy Bingham C; 65 Joe Fields C; 68 Reggie McElroy T; 79 Marvin Powell T; 53 Jim Sweeney G; Defensive linemen (DL): 95 Tom Baldwin NT; 78 Barry Bennett DE; 99 Mark Gastineau DE; 73 Joe Klecko NT; 93 Marty Lyons DE; 76 Ben Rudolph DE	Linebackers (LB): 59 Kyle Clifton ILB; 50 Bob Crable OLB; 55 Charles Jackson OLB; 56 Lance Mehl ILB; 58 Matt Monger OLB; 57 John Woodring OLB; Defensive backs (DB): 38 Larry Flowers SS; 35 Kerry Glenn CB; 39 Harry Hamilton FS; 28 Carl Howard CB; 40 Bobby Jackson CB; 26 Lester Lyles SS; 29 Johnny Lynn CB/FS; 36 Rich Miano FS; 20 Davlin Mullen CB; 21 Kirk Springs SS; Special teams (ST): 13 Dave Jennings P; 5 Pat Leahy K	Reserve: 31 Marion Barber RB (IR); 54 Troy Benson LB (IR); 27 Russell Carter CB (IR); 86 Glenn Dennison TE (IR); 37 Donnie Elder CB (IR); 94 Rusty Guilbeau LB (IR); 80 Lam Jones WR (IR); 90 Brian Luft DE (IR); 48 Ken Schroy S (IR); 70 Stan Waldemore G (IR); Rookies in italics

== Preseason ==
=== Schedule ===
Week	Date	Opponent	Result	Record	Venue	Attendance
1	August 10	Philadelphia Eagles	L 17–37	0–1	Giants Stadium	30,097
2	August 17	at Cincinnati Bengals	L 20–24	0–2	Riverfront Stadium	40,371
3	August 24	at New York Giants	L 31–34 (OT)	0–3	Giants Stadium	63,174
4	August 31	at Green Bay Packers	W 30–20	1–3	Lambeau Field	56,753

== Regular season ==
=== Schedule ===
Week	Date	Opponent	Result	Record	Venue	Attendance
1	September 8	at Los Angeles Raiders	**L** 0–31	0–1	Los Angeles Memorial Coliseum	57,123
2	September 15	**Buffalo Bills**	**W** 42–3	1–1	Giants Stadium	63,449
3	September 22	at Green Bay Packers	**W** 24–3	2–1	Milwaukee County Stadium	53,667
4	September 29	**Indianapolis Colts**	**W** 25–20	3–1	Giants Stadium	61,987
5	October 6	at Cincinnati Bengals	**W** 29–20	4–1	Riverfront Stadium	51,785
6	October 14	**Miami Dolphins**	**W** 23–7	5–1	Giants Stadium	73,807
7	October 20	at **New England Patriots**	**L** 13–20	5–2	Sullivan Stadium	58,163
8	October 27	Seattle Seahawks	**W** 17–14	6–2	Giants Stadium	69,320
9	November 3	at **Indianapolis Colts**	**W** 35–17	7–2	Hoosier Dome	59,683
10	November 10	at **Miami Dolphins**	**L** 17–21	7–3	Miami Orange Bowl	73,965
11	November 17	Tampa Bay Buccaneers	**W** 62–28	8–3	Giants Stadium	65,344
12	November 24	**New England Patriots**	**W** 16–13 (OT)	9–3	Giants Stadium	74,100
13	November 28	at Detroit Lions	**L** 20–31	9–4	Pontiac Silverdome	65,531
14	December 8	at **Buffalo Bills**	**W** 27–7	10–4	Rich Stadium	23,122
15	December 14	Chicago Bears	**L** 6–19	10–5	Giants Stadium	74,752
16	December 22	Cleveland Browns	**W** 37–10	11–5	Giants Stadium	59,073
Note: Intra-division opponents are in **bold** text.

== Regular season game summaries ==
=== Week 1 (Sunday, September 8, 1985): at Los Angeles Raiders ===
Week 1: New York Jets at Los Angeles Raiders – Game summary

Quarter	1	2	3	4	Total
Jets (0–1)	0	0	0	0	0
Raiders (1–0)	7	14	7	3	31

at Los Angeles Memorial Coliseum • Los Angeles, California

- Date: September 8, 1985
- Game time: 4:00 p.m. EDT
- Game attendance: 57,123
- Referee: Tom Dooley
- TV announcers (NBC): Dick Enberg (play-by-play) and Merlin Olsen (color commentator)

Team	Category	Player	Statistics
NYJ	Passing	Ken O'Brien	16/29, 192 YDS, 2 INTs
NYJ	Rushing	Freeman McNeil	17 CAR, 44 YDS
NYJ	Receiving	Mickey Shuler	7 REC, 88 YDS
RAI	Passing	Jim Plunkett	14/21, 242 YDS, 1 TD
RAI	Rushing	Marcus Allen	20 CAR, 76 YDS, 2 TDs
RAI	Receiving	Todd Christensen	6 REC, 87 YDS

Scoring summary

Quarter	Time	Drive			Team	Scoring information	Score	
Quarter	Time	Plays	Yards	TOP	Team	Scoring information	NYJ	RAI
1	1:13				Raiders	Allen 1-yard touchdown run, Bahr kick good	0	7
2	12:10				Raiders	Williams 41-yard touchdown reception from Plunkett, Bahr kick good	0	14
2	5:08				Raiders	Allen 3-yard touchdown run, Bahr kick good	0	21
3	11:38	—	—	—	Raiders	Interception returned 76 yards for touchdown by Toran, Bahr kick good	0	28
4	8:29				Raiders	20-yard field goal by Bahr	0	31
"TOP" = time of possession. For other American football terms, see Glossary of American football.							0	31

- Point spread:
- Over/under:
- Time of game:

Jets	Game statistics	Raiders
14	First downs	19
24–62	Rushes–yards	35–122
192	Passing yards	258
16–29–2	Passes	15–22–0
10–61	Sacked–yards	4–24
131	Net passing yards	234
193	Total yards	356
0	Return yards	125
7–43	Punts	4–37
1–0	Fumbles–lost	0–0
2–10	Penalties–yards	7–60
28:21	Time of possession	31:39

=== Week 2 (Sunday, September 15, 1985): vs. Buffalo Bills ===
Week 2: Buffalo Bills at New York Jets – Game summary

Quarter	1	2	3	4	Total
Bills (0–2)	3	0	0	0	3
Jets (1–1)	0	21	14	7	42

at Giants Stadium • East Rutherford, New Jersey

- Date: September 15, 1985
- Game time: 1:00 p.m. EDT
- Game attendance: 63,449
- Referee: Pat Haggerty
- TV announcers (NBC): Marv Albert (play-by-play) and Bob Griese (color commentator)

Team	Category	Player	Statistics
BUF	Passing		
BUF	Rushing		
BUF	Receiving		
NYJ	Passing		
NYJ	Rushing		
NYJ	Receiving		

Scoring summary

Quarter	Time	Drive			Team	Scoring information	Score	
Quarter	Time	Plays	Yards	TOP	Team	Scoring information	BUF	NYJ
"TOP" = time of possession. For other American football terms, see Glossary of American football.							3	42

- Point spread:
- Over/under:
- Time of game:

Bills	Game statistics	Jets
	First downs	
	Rushes–yards	
	Passing yards	
	Passes	
	Sacked–yards	
	Net passing yards	
	Total yards	
	Return yards	
	Punts	
	Fumbles–lost	
	Penalties–yards	
	Time of possession	

=== Week 3 (Sunday, September 22, 1985): at Green Bay Packers ===
Week 3: New York Jets at Green Bay Packers – Game summary

Quarter	1	2	3	4	Total
Jets (2–1)	7	0	10	7	24
Packers (1–2)	3	0	0	0	3

at Milwaukee County Stadium • Milwaukee, Wisconsin

- Date: September 22, 1985
- Game time: 4:00 p.m. EDT
- Game attendance: 53,667
- Referee: Bob Frederic
- TV announcers (NBC): Marv Albert (play-by-play) and Bob Griese (color commentator)

Team	Category	Player	Statistics
NYJ	Passing		
NYJ	Rushing		
NYJ	Receiving		
GB	Passing		
GB	Rushing		
GB	Receiving		

Scoring summary

Quarter	Time	Drive			Team	Scoring information	Score	
Quarter	Time	Plays	Yards	TOP	Team	Scoring information	NYJ	GB
"TOP" = time of possession. For other American football terms, see Glossary of American football.							24	3

- Point spread:
- Over/under:
- Time of game:

Jets	Game statistics	Packers
	First downs	
	Rushes–yards	
	Passing yards	
	Passes	
	Sacked–yards	
	Net passing yards	
	Total yards	
	Return yards	
	Punts	
	Fumbles–lost	
	Penalties–yards	
	Time of possession	

=== Week 4 (Sunday, September 29, 1985): vs. Indianapolis Colts ===
Week 4: Indianapolis Colts at New York Jets – Game summary

Quarter	1	2	3	4	Total
Colts (1–3)	0	10	7	3	20
Jets (3–1)	6	12	7	0	25

at Giants Stadium • East Rutherford, New Jersey

- Date: September 29, 1985
- Game time: 4:00 p.m. EDT
- Game attendance: 61,987
- Referee: Dick Jorgensen
- TV announcers (NBC): Don Criqui (play-by-play) and Bob Trumpy (color commentator)

Team	Category	Player	Statistics
IND	Passing		
IND	Rushing		
IND	Receiving		
NYJ	Passing		
NYJ	Rushing		
NYJ	Receiving		

Scoring summary

Quarter	Time	Drive			Team	Scoring information	Score	
Quarter	Time	Plays	Yards	TOP	Team	Scoring information	IND	NYJ
"TOP" = time of possession. For other American football terms, see Glossary of American football.							20	25

- Point spread:
- Over/under:
- Time of game:

Colts	Game statistics	Jets
	First downs	
	Rushes–yards	
	Passing yards	
	Passes	
	Sacked–yards	
	Net passing yards	
	Total yards	
	Return yards	
	Punts	
	Fumbles–lost	
	Penalties–yards	
	Time of possession	

=== Week 5 (Sunday, October 6, 1985): at Cincinnati Bengals ===
Week 5: New York Jets at Cincinnati Bengals – Game summary

Quarter	1	2	3	4	Total
Jets (4–1)	7	7	12	3	29
Bengals (1–4)	7	6	0	7	20

at Riverfront Stadium • Cincinnati, Ohio

- Date: October 6, 1985
- Game time: 4:00 p.m. EDT
- Game attendance: 51,785
- Referee: Ben Dreith
- TV announcers (NBC): Don Criqui (play-by-play) and Bob Trumpy (color commentator)

Team	Category	Player	Statistics
NYJ	Passing		
NYJ	Rushing		
NYJ	Receiving		
CIN	Passing		
CIN	Rushing		
CIN	Receiving		

Scoring summary

Quarter	Time	Drive			Team	Scoring information	Score	
Quarter	Time	Plays	Yards	TOP	Team	Scoring information	NYJ	CIN
"TOP" = time of possession. For other American football terms, see Glossary of American football.							29	20

- Point spread:
- Over/under:
- Time of game:

Jets	Game statistics	Bengals
	First downs	
	Rushes–yards	
	Passing yards	
	Passes	
	Sacked–yards	
	Net passing yards	
	Total yards	
	Return yards	
	Punts	
	Fumbles–lost	
	Penalties–yards	
	Time of possession	

=== Week 6 (Monday, October 14, 1985): vs. Miami Dolphins ===
Week 6: Miami Dolphins at New York Jets – Game summary

Quarter	1	2	3	4	Total
Dolphins (4–2)	0	0	7	0	7
Jets (5–1)	0	6	10	7	23

at Giants Stadium • East Rutherford, New Jersey

- Date: October 14, 1985
- Game time: 9:06 p.m. EDT
- Game weather: Cloudy & Foggy • 65 °F (18 °C) • Wind SE 7 miles per hour (11 km/h; 6.1 kn)
- Game attendance: 73,807
- Referee: Red Cashion
- TV announcers (ABC): Frank Gifford (play-by-play), Joe Namath (color commentator) and O. J. Simpson (color commentator)

Team	Category	Player	Statistics
MIA	Passing		
MIA	Rushing		
MIA	Receiving		
NYJ	Passing		
NYJ	Rushing		
NYJ	Receiving		

Scoring summary

Quarter	Time	Drive			Team	Scoring information	Score	
Quarter	Time	Plays	Yards	TOP	Team	Scoring information	MIA	NYJ
"TOP" = time of possession. For other American football terms, see Glossary of American football.							7	23

- Point spread:
- Over/under:
- Time of game: 2 hours, 45 minutes

Dolphins	Game statistics	Jets
	First downs	
	Rushes–yards	
	Passing yards	
	Passes	
	Sacked–yards	
	Net passing yards	
	Total yards	
	Return yards	
	Punts	
	Fumbles–lost	
	Penalties–yards	
	Time of possession	

=== Week 7 (Sunday, October 20, 1985): at New England Patriots ===
Week 7: New York Jets at New England Patriots – Game summary

Quarter	1	2	3	4	Total
Jets (5–2)	0	3	3	7	13
Patriots (4–3)	3	3	0	14	20

at Sullivan Stadium • Foxboro, Massachusetts

- Date: October 20, 1985
- Game time: 4:00 p.m. EDT
- Game weather: Cloudy • 54 °F (12 °C) • Wind NNW 10 miles per hour (16 km/h; 8.7 kn)
- Game attendance: 58,163
- Referee: Fred Silva
- TV announcers (NBC): Marv Albert (play-by-play) and Bob Griese (color commentator)

Team	Category	Player	Statistics
NYJ	Passing	Ken O'Brien	15/31, 246 YDS, 1 INT
NYJ	Rushing	Johnny Hector	21 CAR, 80 YDS
NYJ	Receiving	Wesley Walker	6 REC, 140 YDS
NE	Passing	Steve Grogan	11/32, 171 YDS, 1 TD, 1 INT
NE	Rushing	Craig James	22 CAR, 94 YDS
NE	Receiving	Stanley Morgan	3 REC, 71 YDS

Scoring summary

Quarter	Time	Drive			Team	Scoring information	Score	
Quarter	Time	Plays	Yards	TOP	Team	Scoring information	NYJ	NE
1	1:56				Patriots	19-yard field goal by Franklin	0	3
2	9:30				Patriots	53-yard field goal by Leahy	3	3
2	2:37				Patriots	44-yard field goal by Franklin	3	6
3	5:48				Patriots	52-yard field goal by Leahy	6	6
4	10:22				Patriots	Fryar 36-yard touchdown reception from Grogan, Franklin kick good	6	13
4	6:50				Jets	Paige 2-yard touchdown run, Leahy kick good	13	13
4	3:27				Patriots	Grogan 3-yard touchdown run, Franklin kick good	13	20
"TOP" = time of possession. For other American football terms, see Glossary of American football.							13	20

- Point spread:
- Over/under:
- Time of game: 3 hours, 4 minutes

Jets	Game statistics	Patriots
	First downs	
	Rushes–yards	
	Passing yards	
	Passes	
	Sacked–yards	
	Net passing yards	
	Total yards	
	Return yards	
	Punts	
	Fumbles–lost	
	Penalties–yards	
	Time of possession	

=== Week 8 (Sunday, October 27, 1985): vs. Seattle Seahawks ===
Week 8: Seattle Seahawks at New York Jets – Game summary

Quarter	1	2	3	4	Total
Seahawks (4–4)	0	14	0	0	14
Jets (6–2)	0	0	7	10	17

at Giants Stadium • East Rutherford, New Jersey

- Date: October 27, 1985
- Game time: 1:01 p.m. EST
- Game weather: Sunny • 69 °F (21 °C) • Wind SW 11 miles per hour (18 km/h; 9.6 kn) to 16 miles per hour (26 km/h; 14 kn)
- Game attendance: 69,320
- Referee: Jerry Seeman
- TV announcers (NBC): Dick Enberg (play-by-play) and Merlin Olsen (color commentator)
- Gamebook

External videos
- 1985 Seahawks at Jets – Full game broadcast
- 1985 Seahawks at Jets – NFL Films highlights

Team	Category	Player	Statistics
SEA	Passing	Dave Krieg	9/20, 148 YDS, 1 TD, 2 INTs
SEA	Rushing	Randall Morris	23 CAR, 88 YDS
SEA	Receiving	Daryl Turner	2 REC, 78 YDS, 1 TD
NYJ	Passing	Ken O'Brien	13/25, 182 YDS, 2 TDs, 1 INT
NYJ	Rushing	Freeman McNeil	22 CAR, 151 YDS
NYJ	Receiving	Rocky Klever	3 REC, 43 YDS

Scoring summary

Quarter	Time	Drive			Team	Scoring information	Score	
Quarter	Time	Plays	Yards	TOP	Team	Scoring information	SEA	NYJ
2	9:08	6	80	2:26	Seahawks	Turner 45-yard touchdown reception from Krieg, Johnson kick good	7	0
2	0:46	—	—	—	Seahawks	Fumble recovery returned 79 yards for touchdown by Green, Johnson kick good	14	0
3	4:10	9	69	6:02	Jets	McNeil 16-yard touchdown reception from O'Brien, Leahy kick good	14	7
4	12:47	3	2	1:28	Jets	41-yard field goal by Leahy	14	10
4	5:11	7	91	4:02	Jets	Walker 15-yard touchdown reception from O'Brien, Pat Leahy kick good	14	17
"TOP" = time of possession. For other American football terms, see Glossary of American football.							14	17

- Point spread:
- Over/under:
- Time of game: 3 hours, 15 minutes

Seahawks	Game statistics	Jets
	First downs	
	Rushes–yards	
	Passing yards	
	Passes	
	Sacked–yards	
	Net passing yards	
	Total yards	
	Return yards	
	Punts	
	Fumbles–lost	
	Penalties–yards	
	Time of possession	

=== Week 9 (Sunday, November 3, 1985): at Indianapolis Colts ===
Week 9: New York Jets at Indianapolis Colts – Game summary

Quarter	1	2	3	4	Total
Jets (7–2)	14	21	0	0	35
Colts (3–6)	0	3	7	7	17

at Hoosier Dome • Indianapolis, Indiana

- Date: November 3, 1985
- Game time: 4:00 p.m. EST
- Game weather: None (indoor stadium)
- Game attendance: 59,483
- Referee: Jerry Markbreit
- TV announcers (NBC): Don Criqui (play-by-play) and Bob Trumpy (color commentator)

Team	Category	Player	Statistics
NYJ	Passing		
NYJ	Rushing		
NYJ	Receiving		
IND	Passing		
IND	Rushing		
IND	Receiving		

Scoring summary

Quarter	Time	Drive			Team	Scoring information	Score	
Quarter	Time	Plays	Yards	TOP	Team	Scoring information	NYJ	IND
"TOP" = time of possession. For other American football terms, see Glossary of American football.							35	17

- Point spread:
- Over/under:
- Time of game:

Jets	Game statistics	Colts
	First downs	
	Rushes–yards	
	Passing yards	
	Passes	
	Sacked–yards	
	Net passing yards	
	Total yards	
	Return yards	
	Punts	
	Fumbles–lost	
	Penalties–yards	
	Time of possession	

=== Week 10 (Sunday, November 10, 1985): at Miami Dolphins ===
Week 10: New York Jets at Miami Dolphins – Game summary

Quarter	1	2	3	4	Total
Jets (7–3)	0	3	7	7	17
Dolphins (6–4)	0	7	7	7	21

at Miami Orange Bowl • Miami, Florida

- Date: November 10, 1985
- Game time: 4:01 p.m. EDT
- Game weather: Mostly Sunny • 84 °F (29 °C) • Wind E 14 miles per hour (23 km/h; 12 kn)
- Game attendance: 73,965
- Referee: Bob McElwee
- TV announcers (NBC): Dick Enberg (play-by-play) and Merlin Olsen (color commentator)

Team	Category	Player	Statistics
NYJ	Passing		
NYJ	Rushing		
NYJ	Receiving		
MIA	Passing		
MIA	Rushing		
MIA	Receiving		

Scoring summary

Quarter	Time	Drive			Team	Scoring information	Score	
Quarter	Time	Plays	Yards	TOP	Team	Scoring information	NYJ	MIA
"TOP" = time of possession. For other American football terms, see Glossary of American football.							17	21

- Point spread:
- Over/under:
- Time of game:

Jets	Game statistics	Dolphins
	First downs	
	Rushes–yards	
	Passing yards	
	Passes	
	Sacked–yards	
	Net passing yards	
	Total yards	
	Return yards	
	Punts	
	Fumbles–lost	
	Penalties–yards	
	Time of possession	

=== Week 11 (Sunday, November 17, 1985): vs. Tampa Bay Buccaneers ===
Week 11: Tampa Bay Buccaneers at New York Jets – Game summary

Quarter	1	2	3	4	Total
Buccaneers (4–4)	14	7	7	0	28
Jets (8–3)	17	24	14	7	62

at Giants Stadium • East Rutherford, New Jersey

- Date: November 17, 1985
- Game time: 1:16 p.m. EST
- Game weather: Partly Sunny • 59 °F (15 °C) • Wind NW 7 miles per hour (11 km/h; 6.1 kn)
- Game attendance: 65,344
- Referee: Gordon McCarter
- TV announcers (CBS): Verne Lundquist (play-by-play) and Terry Bradshaw (color commentator)

Team	Category	Player	Statistics
TB	Passing		
TB	Rushing		
TB	Receiving		
NYJ	Passing		
NYJ	Rushing		
NYJ	Receiving		

Scoring summary

Quarter	Time	Drive			Team	Scoring information	Score	
Quarter	Time	Plays	Yards	TOP	Team	Scoring information	TB	NYJ
"TOP" = time of possession. For other American football terms, see Glossary of American football.							28	62

- Point spread:
- Over/under:
- Time of game: 3 hours, 29 minutes

Buccaneers	Game statistics	Jets
	First downs	
	Rushes–yards	
	Passing yards	
	Passes	
	Sacked–yards	
	Net passing yards	
	Total yards	
	Return yards	
	Punts	
	Fumbles–lost	
	Penalties–yards	
	Time of possession	

=== Week 12 (Sunday, November 24, 1985): vs. New England Patriots ===
Week 12: New England Patriots at New York Jets – Game summary

Quarter	1	2	3	4	OT	Total
Patriots (8–4)	0	3	0	10	0	13
Jets (9–3)	6	0	7	0	3	16

at Giants Stadium • East Rutherford, New Jersey

- Date: November 24, 1985
- Game time: 1:01 p.m. EST
- Game weather: Sunny • 53 °F (12 °C) • Wind NW 12 miles per hour (19 km/h; 10 kn) to 22 miles per hour (35 km/h; 19 kn)
- Game attendance: 74,100
- Referee: Bob Frederic
- TV announcers (NBC): Charlie Jones (play-by-play) and Merlin Olsen (color commentator)

Team	Category	Player	Statistics
NE	Passing		
NE	Rushing		
NE	Receiving		
NYJ	Passing		
NYJ	Rushing		
NYJ	Receiving		

Scoring summary

Quarter	Time	Drive			Team	Scoring information	Score	
Quarter	Time	Plays	Yards	TOP	Team	Scoring information	NE	NYJ
"TOP" = time of possession. For other American football terms, see Glossary of American football.							13	16

- Point spread:
- Over/under:
- Time of game: 3 hours, 39 minutes

Patriots	Game statistics	Jets
	First downs	
	Rushes–yards	
	Passing yards	
	Passes	
	Sacked–yards	
	Net passing yards	
	Total yards	
	Return yards	
	Punts	
	Fumbles–lost	
	Penalties–yards	
	Time of possession	

=== Week 13 (Thursday, November 28, 1985): at Detroit Lions ===
Week 13: New York Jets at Detroit Lions – Game summary

Quarter	1	2	3	4	Total
Jets (9–4)	0	3	7	10	20
Lions (7–6)	3	14	7	7	31

at Pontiac Silverdome • Pontiac, Michigan

- Date: November 28, 1985
- Game time: 12:30 p.m. EST
- Game weather: None (indoor stadium)
- Game attendance: 65,531
- Referee: Chuck Heberling
- TV announcers (NBC): Dick Enberg (play-by-play), Merlin Olsen (color commentator) and Ahmad Rashad (sideline reporter)

Team	Category	Player	Statistics
NYJ	Passing		
NYJ	Rushing		
NYJ	Receiving		
DET	Passing		
DET	Rushing		
DET	Receiving		

Scoring summary

Quarter	Time	Drive			Team	Scoring information	Score	
Quarter	Time	Plays	Yards	TOP	Team	Scoring information	NYJ	DET
"TOP" = time of possession. For other American football terms, see Glossary of American football.							20	31

- Point spread:
- Over/under:
- Time of game:

Jets	Game statistics	Lions
	First downs	
	Rushes–yards	
	Passing yards	
	Passes	
	Sacked–yards	
	Net passing yards	
	Total yards	
	Return yards	
	Punts	
	Fumbles–lost	
	Penalties–yards	
	Time of possession	

=== Week 14 (Sunday, December 8, 1985): at Buffalo Bills ===
Week 14: New York Jets at Buffalo Bills – Game summary

Quarter	1	2	3	4	Total
Jets (10–4)	0	21	0	6	27
Bills (2–12)	0	0	7	0	7

at Rich Stadium • Orchard Park, New York

- Date: December 8, 1985
- Game time: 1:00 p.m. EST
- Game attendance: 23,122
- Referee: Ben Dreith
- TV announcers (NBC): Marv Albert (play-by-play) and Bob Griese (color commentator)

Team	Category	Player	Statistics
NYJ	Passing		
NYJ	Rushing		
NYJ	Receiving		
BUF	Passing		
BUF	Rushing		
BUF	Receiving		

Scoring summary

Quarter	Time	Drive			Team	Scoring information	Score	
Quarter	Time	Plays	Yards	TOP	Team	Scoring information	NYJ	BUF
"TOP" = time of possession. For other American football terms, see Glossary of American football.							27	7

- Point spread:
- Over/under:
- Time of game:

Jets	Game statistics	Bills
	First downs	
	Rushes–yards	
	Passing yards	
	Passes	
	Sacked–yards	
	Net passing yards	
	Total yards	
	Return yards	
	Punts	
	Fumbles–lost	
	Penalties–yards	
	Time of possession	

=== Week 15 (Saturday, December 14, 1985): vs. Chicago Bears ===
Week 15: Chicago Bears at New York Jets – Game summary

Quarter	1	2	3	4	Total
Bears (14–1)	3	7	3	6	19
Jets (10–5)	3	0	3	0	6

at Giants Stadium • East Rutherford, New Jersey

- Date: December 14, 1985
- Game time: 12:30 p.m. EST
- Game attendance: 74,752
- Referee: Fred Wyant
- TV announcers (CBS): Pat Summerall (play-by-play), John Madden (color commentator) and Irv Cross (sideline reporter)

Team	Category	Player	Statistics
CHI	Passing		
CHI	Rushing		
CHI	Receiving		
NYJ	Passing		
NYJ	Rushing		
NYJ	Receiving		

Scoring summary

Quarter	Time	Drive			Team	Scoring information	Score	
Quarter	Time	Plays	Yards	TOP	Team	Scoring information	CHI	NYJ
"TOP" = time of possession. For other American football terms, see Glossary of American football.							19	6

- Point spread:
- Over/under:
- Time of game:

Bears	Game statistics	Jets
	First downs	
	Rushes–yards	
	Passing yards	
	Passes	
	Sacked–yards	
	Net passing yards	
	Total yards	
	Return yards	
	Punts	
	Fumbles–lost	
	Penalties–yards	
	Time of possession	

=== Week 16 (Sunday, December 22, 1985): vs. Cleveland Browns ===
Week 16: Cleveland Browns at New York Jets – Game summary

Quarter	1	2	3	4	Total
Browns (8–8)	7	3	0	0	10
Jets (11–5)	10	7	10	10	37

at Giants Stadium • East Rutherford, New Jersey

- Date: December 22, 1985
- Game time: 1:00 p.m. EST
- Game attendance: 59,073
- Referee: Dick Jorgensen
- TV announcers (NBC): Don Criqui (play-by-play) and Bob Trumpy (color commentator)

Team	Category	Player	Statistics
CLE	Passing		
CLE	Rushing		
CLE	Receiving		
NYJ	Passing		
NYJ	Rushing		
NYJ	Receiving		

Scoring summary

Quarter	Time	Drive			Team	Scoring information	Score	
Quarter	Time	Plays	Yards	TOP	Team	Scoring information	CLE	NYJ
"TOP" = time of possession. For other American football terms, see Glossary of American football.							10	37

- Point spread:
- Over/under:
- Time of game:

Browns	Game statistics	Jets
	First downs	
	Rushes–yards	
	Passing yards	
	Passes	
	Sacked–yards	
	Net passing yards	
	Total yards	
	Return yards	
	Punts	
	Fumbles–lost	
	Penalties–yards	
	Time of possession	

=== Standings ===
AFC East
	W	L	T	PCT	DIV	CONF	PF	PA	STK
^{(2)} Miami Dolphins	12	4	0	.750	6–2	9–3	428	320	W7
^{(4)} New York Jets	11	5	0	.688	6–2	9–3	393	264	W1
^{(5)} New England Patriots	11	5	0	.688	6–2	8–4	362	290	W1
Indianapolis Colts	5	11	0	.313	1–7	2–10	320	386	W2
Buffalo Bills	2	14	0	.125	1–7	2–12	200	381	L6

== Playoffs ==
Round	Date	Opponent (seed)	Time	TV	Result	Record	Game Site	Attendance	Recap
Wild Card	December 28	New England Patriots (5)	4:00 p.m. EST	NBC	L 14–26	0–1	Giants Stadium	70,958	

== Playoff Game summaries ==
=== AFC Wild Card Playoffs (Saturday, December 28, 1985): vs. New England Patriots ===
AFC Wild Card Playoffs: (A5) New England Patriots at (A4) New York Jets – Game summary

Quarter	1	2	3	4	Total
Patriots (12–5)	3	10	10	3	26
Jets (11–6)	0	7	7	0	14

at Giants Stadium • East Rutherford, New Jersey

- Date: December 28, 1985
- Game time: 4:07 p.m. EST
- Game weather: Partly Cloudy • 33 °F (1 °C) • Wind NW 15 miles per hour (24 km/h; 13 kn) to 30 miles per hour (48 km/h; 26 kn)
- Game attendance: 70,958
- Referee: Jerry Seeman
- TV announcers (NBC): Marv Albert (play-by-play), Bob Griese (color commentator) and Ahmad Rashad (sideline reporter)

Team	Category	Player	Statistics
NE	Passing		
NE	Rushing		
NE	Receiving		
NYJ	Passing		
NYJ	Rushing		
NYJ	Receiving		

Scoring summary

Quarter	Time	Drive			Team	Scoring information	Score	
Quarter	Time	Plays	Yards	TOP	Team	Scoring information	NE	NYJ
"TOP" = time of possession. For other American football terms, see Glossary of American football.							26	14

- Point spread:
- Over/under:
- Time of game: 3 hours, 0 minutes

Patriots	Game statistics	Jets
	First downs	
	Rushes–yards	
	Passing yards	
	Passes	
	Sacked–yards	
	Net passing yards	
	Total yards	
	Return yards	
	Punts	
	Fumbles–lost	
	Penalties–yards	
	Time of possession	

== Awards and honors ==
- Ken O'Brien, NFL passing leader (96.2 passer rating)
