= 1986–87 NFL playoffs =

American football tournament

- Dates: December 28, 1986–January 25, 1987
- Season: 1986
- Teams: 10
- Games played: 9
- Super Bowl XXI site: Rose Bowl; Pasadena, California
- Defending champions: Chicago Bears
- Champion: New York Giants (5th title)
- Runner-up: Denver Broncos
- Conference runners-up: Cleveland Browns; Washington Redskins
NFL playoffs
← 1985–86	1987–88 →

The National Football League playoffs for the 1986 season began on December 28, 1986. The postseason tournament concluded with the New York Giants defeating the Denver Broncos in Super Bowl XXI, 39–20, on January 25, 1987, at the Rose Bowl in Pasadena, California.

== Participants ==
Within each conference, the three division winners and the two non-division winners with the best overall regular season records qualified for the playoffs. The NFL did not use a fixed-bracket playoff system. The three division winners were seeded 1–3 based on their overall won-lost-tied record, and received a first-round bye while the wild card teams were seeded 4 and 5, and played in the first round, dubbed the wild-card playoffs or wild-card weekend, with the 4 seed hosting. The second round, the divisional playoffs, had a restriction where two teams from the same division could not meet: the surviving wild card team visited the division champion outside its division that had the higher seed, and the remaining two teams from that conference played each other. The two surviving teams from each conference's divisional playoff games then met in the respective AFC and NFC Conference Championship games, hosted by the higher seed. Finally the Super Bowl, the championship round of the playoffs, was played at a neutral site, with the designated home team based on an annual rotation by conference.

Playoff seeds
Seed	AFC	NFC
1	Cleveland Browns (Central winner)	New York Giants (East winner)
2	Denver Broncos (West winner)	Chicago Bears (Central winner)
3	New England Patriots (East winner)	San Francisco 49ers (West winner)
4	New York Jets (wild card)	Washington Redskins (wild card)
5	Kansas City Chiefs (wild card)	Los Angeles Rams (wild card)

== Bracket ==
Note: The New York Giants (the NFC one seed) did not play the Washington Redskins (the four seed) in the Divisional playoff round because both teams were in the same division.

Jan 4 – Mile High Stadium
3	New England	17
Dec 28 – Giants Stadium	Jan 11 – Cleveland Stadium
2	Denver	22
AFC
5	Kansas City	15	2	Denver	23*
Jan 3 – Cleveland Stadium
4	NY Jets	35	1	Cleveland	20
AFC Championship
4	NY Jets	20
Jan 25 – Rose Bowl
1	Cleveland	23**
Divisional round
Wild-card round	A2	Denver	20
Jan 3 – Soldier Field
N1	NY Giants	39
Super Bowl XXI
4	Washington	27
Dec 28 – RFK Memorial Stadium	Jan 11 – Giants Stadium
2	Chicago	13
NFC
5	LA Rams	7	4	Washington	0
Jan 4 – Giants Stadium
4	Washington	19	1	NY Giants	17
NFC Championship
3	San Francisco	3
1	NY Giants	49

* Indicates OT victory
** Indicates 2OT victory

== Schedule ==
In the United States, NBC broadcast the AFC playoff games, while CBS televised the NFC games and Super Bowl XXI.

Round	Away team	Score	Home team	Date	Kickoff (ET / UTC−5)	TV
Wild-card round	Kansas City Chiefs	15–35	New York Jets	December 28, 1986	12:30 p.m.	NBC
Wild-card round	Los Angeles Rams	7–19	Washington Redskins	December 28, 1986	4:00 p.m.	CBS
Divisional round	New York Jets	20–23 (2OT)	Cleveland Browns	January 3, 1987	12:30 p.m.	NBC
Divisional round	Washington Redskins	27–13	Chicago Bears	January 3, 1987	4:00 p.m.	CBS
Divisional round	San Francisco 49ers	3–49	New York Giants	January 4, 1987	12:30 p.m.	CBS
Divisional round	New England Patriots	17–22	Denver Broncos	January 4, 1987	4:00 p.m.	NBC
Conference championships	Denver Broncos	23–20 (OT)	Cleveland Browns	January 11, 1987	12:30 p.m.	NBC
Conference championships	Washington Redskins	0–17	New York Giants	January 11, 1987	4:00 p.m.	CBS
Super Bowl XXI Rose Bowl Pasadena, California	Denver Broncos	20–39	New York Giants	January 25, 1987	6:00 p.m.	CBS

== Wild-card round ==
=== Sunday, December 28, 1986 ===
==== AFC: New York Jets 35, Kansas City Chiefs 15 ====
Kansas City Chiefs vs. New York Jets – Game summary

Quarter	1	2	3	4	Total
Chiefs	6	0	0	9	15
Jets	7	14	7	7	35

at Giants Stadium, East Rutherford, New Jersey

- Game time: 12:30 p.m. EST
- Game attendance: 75,212
- Referee: Red Cashion
- TV announcers (NBC): Marv Albert (play-by-play) and Bob Griese (color commentator)
- Recap, Game Book

Game information

First quarter

- KC – Jeff Smith 1-yard run (kick failed, wide right). Chiefs 6–0.
- NYJ – Freeman McNeil 1-yard run (Pat Leahy kick). Jets 7–6.

Second quarter

- NYJ – Freeman McNeil 1-yard pass from Pat Ryan (Pat Leahy kick). Jets 14–6.
- NYJ – Al Toon 11-yard pass from Pat Ryan (Pat Leahy kick). Jets 21–6.

Third quarter

- NYJ – Kevin McArthur 21-yard interception return (Pat Leahy kick), 14:47. Jets 28–6.

Fourth quarter

- KC – Albert Lewis blocked punt recovery in end zone (Nick Lowery kick). Jets 28–13.
- NYJ – Billy Griggs 6-yard pass from Pat Ryan (Pat Leahy kick). Jets 35–13.
- KC – Safety, Dave Jennings ran out of end zone. Jets 35–15.

Top passers

- KC – Todd Blackledge – 12/21, 80 yards, 2 INT
- NYJ – Pat Ryan – 16/23, 153 yards, 3 TD

Top rushers

- KC – Boyce Green – 8 rushes, 15 yards
- NYJ – Freeman McNeil – 31 rushes, 135 yards, TD

Top receivers

- KC – Henry Marshall – 6 receptions, 72 yards
- NYJ – Al Toon – 4 receptions, 48 yards, TD

Quarterback Pat Ryan led the Jets to victory with three touchdown passes, while New York's defense held the Chiefs to 241 yards (the lowest total allowed by their defense all season) and forced three turnovers, in Kansas City's first postseason appearance since 1971.

The Chiefs scored first as backup quarterback Todd Blackledge, filling in for injured starter Bill Kenney, led the team on a 67-yard drive capped by running back Jeff Smith's 1-yard touchdown run, but Nick Lowery was unsuccessful with the following PAT. On their ensuing possession, the Jets faced fourth down and 6 on the Kansas City 33-yard line. Rather than attempt a long field goal, Ryan faked a pitch to Freeman McNeil and rushed for a 24-yard gain. Two plays later, McNeil scored on a 4-yard rushing touchdown to give the Jets a 7–6 lead.

New York now had the momentum and would not give it up for the rest of the game. On Kansas City's ensuing drive, New York defenders Harry Hamilton and Russell Carter shared a tackle on running back Larry Moriarty, forcing a fumble that was recovered by linebacker Kyle Clifton. Ryan then converted the turnover with a 1-yard touchdown pass to McNeil. The Chiefs were forced to punt on their next possession due to a sack by Mark Gastineau, and the Jets increased their lead to 21–6 with another score. The key player on this drive was receiver Al Toon, who made a 30-yard reception from Ryan, and later finished the drive with an 11-yard touchdown catch.

On the first play of the third quarter, Jets linebacker Kevin McArthur increased his team's lead to 28–6 by returning an interception 21 yards for a touchdown, which would be the only score of the quarter. Most of it would be taken up by the Chiefs' ensuing drive, which ended with a failed fourth and 1 conversion attempt. In the fourth quarter, they finally managed to score when cornerback Albert Lewis recovered a blocked punt in the end zone for a touchdown. However, this was quickly countered on the Jets next possession as Ryan completed a 38-yard pass to Wesley Walker before finishing it with a 6-yard touchdown throw to tight end Billy Griggs (his first NFL reception). The only other score of the game would be an intentional safety when Jets punter Dave Jennings ran out of the end zone in the game's closing minutes.

McNeil finished the game with 135 rushing yards, three receptions for 16 yards, and two touchdowns.

This was the second postseason meeting between the Chiefs and Jets. Kansas City won the only prior meeting when both teams were in the AFL. This was the first home postseason win for the Jets since the 1968 American Football League Championship Game. It would also be the last playoff win for the Jets until 1998.

Previous playoff games
Kansas City leads 1–0 in all-time playoff games

1969

Kansas City Chiefs 13 @ New York Jets 6

1969 AFL Divisional playoffs

==== NFC: Washington Redskins 19, Los Angeles Rams 7 ====
Los Angeles Rams vs. Washington Redskins – Game summary

Quarter	1	2	3	4	Total
Rams	0	0	0	7	7
Redskins	10	3	3	3	19

at Robert F. Kennedy Memorial Stadium, Washington, D.C.

- Game time: 4:00 p.m. EST
- Game attendance: 54,567
- Referee: Gordon McCarter
- TV announcers (CBS): Pat Summerall (play-by-play) and John Madden (color commentator)

Game information

First quarter

- WAS – Jess Atkinson 25-yard field goal. Redskins 3–0.
- WAS – Kelvin Bryant 14-yard pass from Jay Schroeder (Jess Atkinson kick). Redskins 10–0.

Second quarter

- WAS – Jess Atkinson 20-yard field goal. Redskins 13–0.

Third quarter

- WAS – Jess Atkinson 38-yard field goal. Redskins 16–0.

Fourth quarter

- RAMS – Kevin House 12-yard pass from Jim Everett (Mike Lansford kick). Redskins 16–7.
- WAS – Jess Atkinson 19-yard field goal. Redskins 19–7.

Top passers

- RAMS – Jim Everett – 9/18, 136 yards, TD, 2 INT
- WAS – Jay Schroeder – 13/23, 90 yards, TD

Top rushers

- RAMS – Eric Dickerson – 26 rushes, 158 yards
- WAS – George Rogers – 29 rushes, 115 yards

Top receivers

- RAMS – Kevin House – 3 receptions, 70 yards, TD
- WAS – Art Monk – 5 receptions, 34 yards

Although they outgained Washington in total yards 324–228, the Rams turned over the ball six times en route to a defeat against the Redskins.

In the first quarter, a fumble lost by Los Angeles running back Eric Dickerson led to Washington kicker Jess Atkinson's 25-yard field goal. The Redskins then extended their lead, 10–0, driving 60 yards to quarterback Jay Schroeder's 14-yard touchdown to running back Kelvin Bryant. A key play on the drive was a controversial pass interference penalty against Rams Pro Bowl cornerback LeRoy Irvin, which gave the Redskins 28 yards; 13 from the initial penalty and another 15 against Irvin for arguing with officials about it. LA had a great chance to respond when quarterback Jim Everett completed a 45-yard pass to Kevin House on the Redskins 28, but the drive ended with no points when Dickerson lost another fumble.

In the second quarter, Rams tight end David Hill lost a fumble due to a hit by Monte Coleman. Linebacker Neal Olkewicz recovered the ball and returned 19 yards to Rams 30-yard line, setting up Atkinson's 20-yard field goal. Hill's fumble was confirmed by a replay review that lasted nearly five minutes, prompting Redskins safety Curtis Jordan to declare "I thought they were trying to get in touch with Oliver North." This was the first time in NFL postseason history a replay was used to confirm a field call of a fumble.

Atkinson made two more field goals in the second half. The Rams' lone score of the game was Everett's 12-yard touchdown pass to House during the final quarter at the end of a 96-yard drive that was set up by Dickerson's 65-yard run. It seemed that Dickerson was headed for the end zone but he was caught from behind by Redskins defensive back Darrell Green. Later on, the Rams had a chance to score again, but Dickerson lost his third fumble of the day, this one while trying to convert a fourth and 1 on the Redskins 39.

Redskins running back George Rogers finished the game with 119 rushing yards, while Dickerson rushed for 158. Atkinson, who had been signed by Washington a few weeks before this game and had not kicked any field goals in over a year, set a postseason franchise record with four field goals.

This was the fourth postseason meeting between the Rams and Redskins. Los Angeles had won two of the prior three meetings.

Previous playoff games
Los Angeles/ Cleveland Rams leads 2–1 in all-time playoff games

1945

Washington Redskins 14 @ Cleveland Rams 15

1945 NFL Championship Game

1974

Washington Redskins 10 @ Los Angeles Rams 19

1974 NFC Divisional playoffs

1983

Los Angeles Rams 7 @ Washington Redskins 51

1983 NFC Divisional playoffs

== Divisional round ==
=== Saturday, January 3, 1987 ===
==== AFC: Cleveland Browns 23, New York Jets 20 (2OT) ====
New York Jets vs. Cleveland Browns – Game summary

Quarter	1	2	3	4	OT	2OT	Total
Jets	7	3	3	7	0	0	20
Browns	7	3	0	10	0	3	23

at Cleveland Stadium, Cleveland, Ohio

- Game time: 12:30 p.m. EST
- Game attendance: 79,720
- Referee: Ben Dreith
- TV announcers (NBC): Don Criqui (play-by-play) and Bob Trumpy (color commentator)

Game information

First quarter

- NYJ – Wesley Walker 42-yard pass from Pat Ryan (Pat Leahy kick). Jets 7–0.
- CLE – Herman Fontenot 37-yard pass from Bernie Kosar (Mark Moseley kick). Tied 7–7.

Second quarter

- CLE – Mark Moseley 38-yard field goal. Browns 10–7.
- NYJ – Pat Leahy 46-yard field goal. Tied 10–10.

Third quarter

- NYJ – Pat Leahy 37-yard field goal. Jets 13–10.

Fourth quarter

- NYJ – Freeman McNeil 25-yard run (Pat Leahy kick). Jets 20–10.
- CLE – Kevin Mack 1-yard run (Mark Moseley kick). Jets 20–17.
- CLE – Mark Moseley 22-yard field goal. Tied 20–20.

First overtime

- No scoring plays.

Second overtime

- CLE – Mark Moseley 27-yard field goal. Browns 23–20.

Top passers

- NYJ – Ken O'Brien – 11/19, 134 yards
- CLE – Bernie Kosar – 33/64, 489 yards, TD, 2 INT

Top rushers

- NYJ – Freeman McNeil – 25 rushes, 71 yards, TD
- CLE – Kevin Mack – 20 rushes, 63 yards, TD

Top receivers

- NYJ – Al Toon – 5 receptions, 93 yards
- CLE – Ozzie Newsome – 6 receptions, 114 yards

Thirty-eight-year-old Browns kicker Mark Moseley, a former Washington Redskin whom Cleveland had talked out of retirement in order to replace the injured Matt Bahr less than two months earlier, made the game-winning 27-yard field goal after 2:02 elapsed of the second overtime period, making this the third longest game in NFL history and giving Cleveland their first postseason win since 1969.

After Mosely missed a 46-yard field goal attempt on Cleveland's opening possession, the Jets scored first on their third drive of the game with an 82-yard drive. Quarterback Pat Ryan started it off with a 28-yard completion to Al Toon and finished it with a 42-yard touchdown pass to wide receiver Wesley Walker on a flea flicker play. Cleveland responded with Kosar completing passes to Ozzie Newsome for gains of 21 and 23 yards as he led the team 98 yards to score on his 37-yard completion to running back Herman Fontenot. Midway through the second quarter, Jeff Gossett's 39-yard punt pinned New York back on their own 4-yard line. The Jets were unable to get a first down with their drive, and to make matters worse, a 3rd down sack on Ryan by a gang of Browns defenders knocked him out of the game. New York's punt gave Cleveland on the ball at midfield, and they were able to take advantage of the field position, as Kosar's 25-yard completion to fullback Kevin Mack set up a 38-yard Mosely field goal that gave the Browns a 10–7 lead. The Jets, now led by Ken O'Brien, responded with less than two minutes left in the half on a last-second field goal drive to tie the game, featuring his season-long 16-yard run on fourth down and four to keep the drive alive.

Cleveland had to punt on the opening drive of the third quarter, and Kurt Sohn gave the Jets great field position with a 9-yard return to the Browns 41-yard line. New York then drove to a 37-yard Pat Leahy field goal to break the tie. Cleveland responded with a drive to the Jets 26-yard line, but it ended with no points on another missed field goal attempt by Moseley. Early in the fourth quarter, the Browns drove all the way to the New York 3-yard line, only to come up empty when Russell Carter intercepted a pass from Kosar in the end zone. Then after a punt, Kosar's next pass attempt was intercepted again, this time by Jerry Holmes, which set up Freeman McNeil's 25-yard touchdown run on the next play to give his team a 20–10 lead with 4:14 left in regulation. This led Jets announcer Charley Steiner to prematurely declare, "The Jets are gonna win this football game!"

But the Browns then drove 68-yards to score on Mack's 1-yard touchdown run with 1:57 left on the clock, on a drive that was aided by a roughing the passer penalty on Mark Gastineau that nullified an incompletion on second down and 24 from Cleveland's 18-yard line. After a failed onside kick attempt, the Browns stopped New York on two consecutive runs and then sacked O'Brien on a quarterback draw, bringing up 4th down on the Browns 48-yard line. Then they got another lucky break when a punt that would have pinned them inside their own 10-yard line was called back by a Jets holding penalty. On the second punt, Gerald McNeil returned the ball 10 yards to the Browns 32 with 53 seconds on the clock and no timeouts left. Following a 26-yard pass interference penalty on Carl Howard, Kosar completed a 37-yard pass to wide receiver Webster Slaughter on the Jets 5-yard line with 37 seconds to go. However, the Browns hurt themselves with excessive celebration after the catch, costing them several seconds before Kosar could break them up and get his team back to the line of scrimmage. The clock ran down to 15 seconds before the next snap, in which Kosar threw a pass that was broken up and nearly intercepted by Carter. Now with 11 seconds and no timeouts remaining, the Browns decided to play for overtime and had Moseley kick a game-tying 22-yard field goal.

After forcing the Jets to punt on the opening drive of overtime, Cleveland had a great chance to win after Kosar's 35-yard completion to Reggie Langhorne landed them at the Jets 5-yard line. They attempted a field goal on first down, but Moseley missed the 23-yard attempt. Still their defense continued to hold down New York, forcing them to punt on two more possessions. After the first punt, disaster nearly struck Cleveland when Mack fumbled the ball near his own 40-yard line, but Browns guard Paul Farren recovered it. With 2:38 left in the first overtime period, Cleveland got the ball on their own 31 following Dave Jennings' playoff record 14th punt of the game. After moving the ball to the Jets 42, receiver Brian Brennan made a key play when he broke up an errant pass that was nearly intercepted by Lester Lyles. This turned out to be crucial as the Browns running game would go on to take total control of the drive. First, Fontenot rushed for seven yards and then Mack added 26 yards on his next three carries, moving the ball to the 9-yard line to set up Moseley's second game-winning field goal attempt. This time, his kick was good, winning the game for the Browns after 17:02 of overtime play on an 11-play, 59-yard drive.

Kosar set postseason records for completions (33), attempts (64), and passing yards (483), but threw only one touchdown pass and two interceptions. Newsome caught six passes for 114 yards. Mack rushed 20 times for 63 yards and a touchdown, while also catching 5 passes for 51 yards. Toon was the Jets leading receiver with 5 receptions for 93 yards. The Browns tied a playoff record by recording nine sacks in the game, three by defensive tackle Carl Hairston. Cleveland finished the game with 558 yards of total offense. 45 of the Browns' 75 rushing yards in the game were gained on their final drive.

Through the 2025 playoffs, this is the only double overtime game won by the home team.

The game was featured as one of the NFL's Greatest Games as the Marathon by the Lake.

This was the first postseason meeting between the Jets and Browns.

==== NFC: Washington Redskins 27, Chicago Bears 13 ====
Washington Redskins vs. Chicago Bears – Game summary

Quarter	1	2	3	4	Total
Redskins	7	0	7	13	27
Bears	0	13	0	0	13

at Soldier Field, Chicago, Illinois

- Game time: 4:00 p.m. EST/3:00 p.m. CST
- Game attendance: 65,524
- Referee: Bob McElwee
- TV announcers (CBS): Dick Stockton (play-by-play) and Dan Dierdorf (color commentator)

Game information

First quarter

- WAS – Art Monk 28-yard pass from Jay Schroeder (Jess Atkinson kick). Redskins 7–0.
- CHI – Willie Gault 50-yard pass from Doug Flutie (Kevin Butler kick). Tied 7–7.

Second quarter

- CHI – Kevin Butler 23-yard field goal. Bears 10–7.
- CHI – Kevin Butler 41-yard field goal. Bears 13–7.
- WAS – Art Monk 23-yard pass from Jay Schroeder (Jess Atkinson kick). Redskins 14–13.

Third quarter

- WAS – George Rogers 1-yard run (Jess Atkinson kick). Redskins 21–13.
- WAS – Jess Atkinson 35-yard field goal. Redskins 24–13.

Fourth quarter

- WAS – Jess Atkinson 25-yard field goal. Redskins 27–13.

Top passers

- WAS – Jay Schroeder – 15/32, 184 yards, 2 TD, INT
- CHI – Doug Flutie – 11/31, 134 yards, TD, 2 INT

Top rushers

- WAS – George Rogers – 25 rushes, 72 yards, TD
- CHI – Walter Payton – 14 rushes, 38 yards

Top receivers

- WAS – Art Monk – 5 receptions, 81 yards, 2 TD
- CHI – Willie Gault – 5 receptions, 82 yards, TD

The Redskins converted two turnovers into two touchdowns in the second half to overcome the defending champion Bears' 13–7 halftime lead. Chicago finished the game with just 220 yards and 14 first downs, while losing four turnovers.

Chicago had a chance to score early when Dennis Gentry returned the opening kickoff 60 yards to the Redskins' 35-yard line. But after a three-minute drive, the Bears ended up netting just three yards due to penalties and Kevin Butler missed a 49-yard field goal attempt on the last play. Later in the quarter, Washington took a 7–0 lead by driving 69 yards to score on Jay Schroeder's 28-yard touchdown pass to wide receiver Art Monk. Chicago countered with 10:07 remaining in the second quarter on wide receiver Willie Gault's 50-yard touchdown reception from quarterback Doug Flutie. On the Redskins' next possession, Mike Richardson intercepted a pass from Schroeder and returned it 43 yards to the Washington 4-yard line. Still, the Bears could not get into the end zone and settled for a 10–7 lead with Butler's 23-yard field goal. Shortly before halftime, Butler made a 41-yard field goal to extend Chicago's lead to 13–7. The Redskins, thanks to a Vernon Dean interception of a tipped Doug Flutie pass, moved into position for a field goal late in the half, but Steve Cox's last second 50-yard field goal attempt came up short.

However, the Redskins took over the game in the second half. In the third quarter, defensive back Darrell Green returned an interception from Flutie 17 yards to the Bears 26-yard line that set up Schroeder's 23-yard touchdown pass to Monk. Chicago seemed primed to respond when Gentry returned their kickoff 48 yards to the Redskins 42, but after advancing to the Washington 17-yard line, running back Walter Payton lost a fumble due to a hit by defensive tackle Darryl Grant, and safety Alvin Walton recovered the ball. Washington then drove 83 yards, aided by a 17-yard pass interference penalty against Richardson in the end zone, for a touchdown on a George Rogers one-yard run less than a minute into the fourth quarter. Washington place kicker Jess Atkinson made two field goals in the final quarter to close out the scoring, the second one set up by Lew Barnes' muffed punt return that was recovered by Eric Yarber.

In only his second NFL start, Flutie was mauled by the Redskins' defense, completing only 11 of 31 passes, with five completions in the second half. Payton was held to 38 rushing yards on 14 carries. Gentry returned three kickoffs for 127 yards.

This was the sixth postseason meeting between the Redskins and Bears. Chicago previously won three of the five meetings coming in.

Previous playoff games
Chicago leads 3–2 in all-time playoff games

1937

Chicago Bears 21 @ Washington Redskins 28

1937 NFL Championship Game

1940

Chicago Bears 73 @ Washington Redskins 0

1940 NFL Championship Game

1942

Chicago Bears 6 @ Washington Redskins 14

1942 NFL Championship Game

1943

Washington Redskins 21 @ Chicago Bears 41

1943 NFL Championship Game

1984

Chicago Bears 23 @ Washington Redskins 19

1984 NFC Divisional playoffs

=== Sunday, January 4, 1987 ===
==== NFC: New York Giants 49, San Francisco 49ers 3 ====
San Francisco 49ers vs. New York Giants – Game summary

Quarter	1	2	3	4	Total
49ers	3	0	0	0	3
Giants	7	21	21	0	49

at Giants Stadium, East Rutherford, New Jersey

- Game time: 12:30 p.m. EST
- Game attendance: 75,691
- Referee: Jerry Markbreit
- TV announcers (CBS): Pat Summerall (play-by-play) and John Madden (color commentator)

Game information

First quarter

- NYG – Mark Bavaro 24-yard pass from Phil Simms (Raul Allegre kick). Giants 7–0.
- SF – Ray Wersching 26-yard field goal. Giants 7–3.

Second quarter

- NYG – Joe Morris 45-yard run (Raul Allegre kick). Giants 14–3.
- NYG – Bobby Johnson 15-yard pass from Phil Simms (Raul Allegre kick). Giants 21–3.
- NYG – Lawrence Taylor 34-yard interception return (Raul Allegre kick). Giants 28–3.

Third quarter

- NYG – Phil McConkey 28-yard pass from Phil Simms (Raul Allegre kick). Giants 35–3.
- NYG – Zeke Mowatt 29-yard pass from Phil Simms (Raul Allegre kick). Giants 42–3.
- NYG – Joe Morris 2-yard run (Raul Allegre kick). Giants 49–3.

Fourth quarter

- No scoring plays.

Top passers

- SF – Joe Montana – 8/15, 98 yards, 2 INT
- NYG – Phil Simms – 9/19, 136 yards, 4 TD

Top rushers

- SF – Roger Craig – 5 rushes, 17 yards
- NYG – Joe Morris – 24 rushes, 159 yards, 2 TD

Top receivers

- SF – Dwight Clark – 3 receptions, 52 yards
- NYG – Mark Bavaro – 2 receptions, 47 yards, TD

NY Giants quarterback Phil Simms completed only nine of 19 passes for 134 yards, but threw four touchdowns and no interceptions and sat out the fourth quarter while the New York defense allowed only 29 rushing yards, 184 total yards, and a field goal. They also forced four turnovers.

On the 49ers' first drive of the game, wide receiver Jerry Rice caught a very long pass from quarterback Joe Montana and appeared to be on his way for a 50-yard touchdown; however, the future Hall of Famer inexplicably fumbled the football into the Giants end zone without being touched; (John Madden said during the telecast that the artificial turf at Giants Stadium may have been a factor.) Giants safety Kenny Hill recovered the ball in the end zone for a touchback. New York then drove 80 yards in 10 plays to score on Simms' 24-yard touchdown to tight end Mark Bavaro. San Francisco responded with a 26-yard field goal by Ray Wersching, but in the second quarter, Giants safety Herb Welch intercepted a pass from Montana and lateralled the ball to Elvis Patterson, who ran for 16 yards before being tackled. New York then converted with the turnover into a touchdown on Joe Morris' 45-yard run.

On the Giants next possession, they scored on a 12-play, 57-yard drive in which they burned the 49ers with a fake field goal, starting out in normal kicking formation before switching into a shotgun formation with holder Jeff Rutledge as the quarterback. San Francisco's field goal blocking unit was caught without enough defensive backs on the field and Rutledge ended up throwing the ball to a wide open Bavaro for a 23-yard gain on the 49ers 5-yard line. A penalty pushed them back 10 yards, but New York still scored on third down with Simms' 15-yard pass to receiver Bobby Johnson. The situation only got worse for San Francisco from there, as Montana was knocked out of the game due to a hit by nose tackle Jim Burt, while linebacker Lawrence Taylor intercepted his pass and returned it 34 yards for a touchdown, giving the Giants a 28–3 halftime lead.

Simms threw two third quarter touchdown passes, a 28-yard completion to Phil McConkey and a 29-yarder to tight end Zeke Mowatt. Near the end of the quarter, New York linebacker Pepper Johnson intercepted backup quarterback Jeff Kemp's pass and returned the ball 27 yards to the 49ers 5-yard line, setting up the final score of the game on Morris' 2-yard run with 16 seconds left in the third quarter.

After the game when 49er head coach Bill Walsh was asked if Rice's fumble made a difference in the outcome of the game, Walsh replied sarcastically, "Yeah, [that play] did. If it weren't for the fumble, the final score would have been 49 to 10."

Morris finished the game with 24 carries for 159 yards and two touchdowns, along with one receptions for two yards.

The 49ers' loss meant that the following week's title game was the first NFC Championship Game to not involve either them, the Cowboys, or the Rams.

This was fourth postseason meeting between the 49ers and Giants. San Francisco took two of the previous three meetings.

Previous playoff games
San Francisco leads 2–1 in all-time playoff games

1981

New York Giants 24 @ San Francisco 49ers 38

1981 NFC Divisional playoffs

1984

New York Giants 10 @ San Francisco 49ers 21

1984 NFC Divisional playoffs

1985

San Francisco 49ers 3 @ New York Giants 17

1985 NFC Wild Card playoffs

==== AFC: Denver Broncos 22, New England Patriots 17 ====
New England Patriots vs. Denver Broncos – Game summary

Quarter	1	2	3	4	Total
Patriots	0	10	7	0	17
Broncos	3	7	10	2	22

at Mile High Stadium, Denver, Colorado

- Game time: 4:00 p.m. EST/2:00 p.m. MST
- Game attendance: 75,262
- Referee: Jerry Seeman
- TV announcers (NBC): Dick Enberg (play-by-play) and Merlin Olsen (color commentator)

Game information

First quarter

- DEN – Rich Karlis 27-yard field goal. Broncos 3–0.

Second quarter

- NE – Stanley Morgan 19-yard pass from Tony Eason (Tony Franklin kick). Patriots 7–3.
- DEN – John Elway 22-yard run (Rich Karlis kick). Broncos 10–7.
- NE – Tony Franklin 38-yard field goal. Tied 10–10.

Third quarter

- DEN – Rich Karlis 22-yard field goal. Broncos 13–10.
- NE – Stanley Morgan 45-yard pass from Tony Eason (Tony Franklin kick). Patriots 17–13.
- DEN – Vance Johnson 48-yard pass from John Elway (Rich Karlis kick). Broncos 20–17.

Fourth quarter

- DEN – Safety, Tony Eason sacked by Rulon Jones in end zone. Broncos 22–17.

Top passers

- NE – Tony Eason – 13/24, 194 yards, 2 TD
- DEN – John Elway – 13/32, 257 yards, TD, 2 INT

Top rushers

- NE – Tony Collins – 5 rushes, 46 yards
- DEN – Sammy Winder – 19 rushes, 102 yards

Top receivers

- NE – Stanley Morgan – 3 receptions, 100 yards, 2 TD
- DEN – Vance Johnson – 4 receptions, 89 yards, TD

Broncos quarterback John Elway ran for a touchdown and passed for another one as he led Denver to a victory, while running back Sammy Winder rushed for 102 yards and caught a pass for 16. Although New England won the turnover battle (2–0), they were outgained by Denver in total yards 441 to 271, while their quarterback Tony Eason was sacked six times.

In the first quarter, Elway's completions to Steve Sewell and Steve Watson for gains of 39 and 21 yards propelled the team on a drive to the Patriots 4-yard line. From there, Elway tried to run the ball for a score, but was tackled just short of the end zone. Believing he had crossed the plane, Elway angrily spiked the ball into the ground, drawing a penalty that pushed the team back five yards and they ended up having to settle for Rich Karlis' field goal to go up 3–0. In the second quarter, the Patriots took the lead when Eason completed a 19-yard touchdown pass to wide receiver Stanley Morgan to cap an 87-yard drive. However, the Broncos countered with an 82-yard drive to score on Elway's 22-yard touchdown run. Later in the second quarter, New England linebacker Johnny Rembert's interception of an Elway pass on the Broncos 29-yard line led to Tony Franklin's 38-yard field goal, tying the game at 10 by the end of the half.

In the third quarter, Denver drove 80 yards in 15 plays on a drive that consumed more than nine minutes and ended with Karlis' 22-yard field goal to give them a 13–10 lead. The Patriots responded with a trick play, a flea flicker that involved fullback Mosi Tatupu taking a handoff and then pitching the ball back to Eason, who threw a 45-yard touchdown pass to Morgan to retake the lead, 17–13. But Elway then threw a 48-yard touchdown pass to wide receiver Vance Johnson for the go-ahead score on the last play of the third quarter, giving the team a 20–17 lead.

New England had four possessions in the fourth quarter, but the first three ended in punts, while Broncos defensive end Rulon Jones ended the last one by sacking Eason in the end zone for a safety with 1:32 left in the game.

Elway had a rough day in the winning effort, completing only 13 of 32 passes for 257 yards, with one touchdown and two interceptions. Eason completed 13/24 passes for 194 yards and two touchdowns, while also rushing for 23 yards. His top target was Morgan, who caught three passes for 100 yards and two scores. Broncos punter Mike Horan averaged 49 yards per kick on his five punts, and placed three of them in the 20, including the final one that set up Jones' game-clinching safety.

This was the first postseason meeting between the Patriots and Broncos.

== Conference championships ==
=== Sunday, January 11, 1987 ===
==== AFC: Denver Broncos 23, Cleveland Browns 20 (OT) ====
Denver Broncos vs. Cleveland Browns – Game summary

Quarter	1	2	3	4	OT	Total
Broncos	0	10	3	7	3	23
Browns	7	3	0	10	0	20

at Cleveland Stadium, Cleveland, Ohio

- Game time: 12:30 p.m. EST
- Game attendance: 79,973
- Referee: Chuck Heberling
- TV announcers (NBC): Dick Enberg (play-by-play), Merlin Olsen and Bob Griese (color commentators)

Game information

First quarter

- CLE – Herman Fontenot 6-yard pass from Bernie Kosar (Mark Moseley kick). Browns 7–0.

Second quarter

- DEN – Rich Karlis 19-yard field goal. Browns 7–3.
- DEN – Gerald Willhite 1-yard run (Rich Karlis kick). Broncos 10–7.
- CLE – Mark Moseley 29-yard field goal. Tied 10–10.

Third quarter

- DEN – Rich Karlis 26-yard field goal. Broncos 13–10.

Fourth quarter

- CLE – Mark Moseley 24-yard field goal. Tied 13–13.
- CLE – Brian Brennan 48-yard pass from Bernie Kosar (Mark Moseley kick). Browns 20–13.
- DEN – Mark Jackson 5-yard pass from John Elway (Rich Karlis kick). Tied 20–20.

Overtime

- DEN – Rich Karlis 33-yard field goal. Broncos 23–20.

Top passers

- DEN – John Elway – 22/38, 244 yards, TD, INT
- CLE – Bernie Kosar – 18/32, 259 yards, 2 TD, 2 INT

Top rushers

- DEN – Sammy Winder – 26 rushes, 83 yards
- CLE – Kevin Mack – 26 rushes, 94 yards

Top receivers

- DEN – Steve Watson – 3 receptions, 55 yards
- CLE – Brian Brennan – 4 receptions, 72 yards, TD

This game is best remembered for The Drive in Cleveland and Denver sports lore when the Broncos drove 98 yards in 15 plays to tie the game with 37 seconds left in regulation and Denver kicker Rich Karlis kicked the game-winning 33-yard field goal 5:48 into overtime.

The Browns scored first when quarterback Bernie Kosar threw a 6-yard touchdown pass to running back Herman Fontenot at the end of an 86-yard drive. But then Cleveland turned the ball over on three consecutive drives. First Ricky Hunley intercepted Kosar's pass on the last play of the first quarter. Then after a punt, linebacker Jim Ryan picked off a Kosar pass and returned it 21 yards to the Browns 9-yard line. Denver then drove to the 1-yard line, but were halted there and decided to settle for Rich Karlis' 19-yard field goal. After the ensuing kickoff, running back Kevin Mack lost a fumble that was recovered by Ken Woodard on the Cleveland 37. On the next play, Denver quarterback John Elway's 34-yard scramble moved the ball to the 4-yard line. Once again, they ended up facing fourth down on the 1-yard line, but this time they decided to go for the touchdown and Gerald Willhite scored on a sweep right. Cleveland managed to respond with Kosar's 42-yard completion to receiver Clarence Weathers, setting up Mark Moseley's 29-yard field goal to tie the score at 10 with less than a minute left in the half.

In the second half, Elway threw his first interception of the game, a pass that was picked off near the sidelines by rookie Mark Harper. But the Broncos defense rose to the occasion and managed to force a punt. Elway then led Denver inside the Browns 20-yard line where Karlis made a 26-yard field goal to break the tie with 2:50 left in the third quarter.

Cleveland responded with a field goal of their own, a 24-yarder from Moseley to tie the game at 13. Then after a punt, Kosar completed a 48-yard touchdown pass to Brian Brennan, making the score 20–13 with 5:43 left in regulation. On the ensuing kickoff, returner Ken Bell misplayed the kick and it hit the ground in front of him, bouncing to the 2-yard line before he managed to dive on the ball. Elway then led his team 98 yards to tie the game on wide receiver Mark Jackson's 5-yard touchdown reception with 37 seconds left in regulation. Jackson also made a big play earlier on the drive, catching a 20-yard pass from Elway on third down and 18 from the Browns 48-yard line with 1:47 to go. Overall, the drive covered 98 yards in 15 plays without ever facing a fourth down, and only facing a third down three times.

After forcing Cleveland to punt on the opening drive of overtime, Elway led the Broncos 60 yards to set up Karlis' game winning 33-yard field goal. The key play of the drive was a 28-yard completion to Steve Watson on third down and 12 at midfield. Two carries by Sammy Winder then moved the ball to the 16-yard line where Karlis made his game winning kick, which barely made it inside the left upright.

This game was later featured on NFL's Greatest Games.

Until the 2018 season, this was the only AFC Championship Game to go to overtime.

This was the first postseason meeting between the Broncos and Browns. The Broncos would defeat the Browns twice more in two of the next three AFC Championship Games.

==== NFC: New York Giants 17, Washington Redskins 0 ====
Washington Redskins vs. New York Giants – Game summary

Quarter	1	2	3	4	Total
Redskins	0	0	0	0	0
Giants	10	7	0	0	17

at Giants Stadium, East Rutherford, New Jersey

- Game time: 4:00 p.m. EST
- Game attendance: 76,891
- Referee: Pat Haggerty
- TV announcers (CBS): Pat Summerall (play-by-play) and John Madden (color commentator)

Game information

First quarter

- NYG – Raul Allegre 47-yard field goal. Giants 3–0.
- NYG – Lionel Manuel 11-yard pass from Phil Simms (Raul Allegre kick). Giants 10–0.

Second quarter

- NYG – Joe Morris 1-yard run (Raul Allegre kick). Giants 17–0.

Third quarter

- No scoring plays.

Fourth quarter

- No scoring plays.

Top passers

- WAS – Jay Schroeder – 20/50, 195 yards, INT
- NYG – Phil Simms – 7/14, 90 yards, TD

Top rushers

- WAS – Kelvin Bryant – 6 rushes, 25 yards
- NYG – Joe Morris – 29 rushes, 87 yards, TD

Top receivers

- WAS – Art Monk – 8 receptions, 126 yards
- NYG – Lionel Manuel – 2 receptions, 36 yards, TD

The Giants shut out the Redskins, allowing only 150 passing yards and 40 rushing yards. New York won the coin toss. With the winds at Giants Stadium blowing at 32 miles per hour, the Giants chose to defend one end of the field. While this meant that Washington would receive both the opening and second half kickoffs, the Giants were able to avoid kicking into the wind for the first and third quarters. After the Redskins were forced to punt on their opening possession, punter Steve Cox could only manage to kick the ball in the strong wind 23 yards to the Washington 47-yard line. Six plays and 17 yards later, the Giants scored on Raúl Allegre's 47-yard field goal, his longest of the season after joining the team in week 4. After the ensuing kickoff, the Redskins were forced to punt again and Cox managed to only punt the ball 27 yards to the Washington 38-yard line. From there, New York advanced to the Redskins 26. On third down and 10, quarterback Phil Simms threw an incomplete pass and center Bart Oates was called for holding. Rather than take the incompletion to bring up fourth down, Redskins coach Joe Gibbs accepted the holding penalty, hoping to push and keep the Giants out of field goal range. But on the next play, Simms completed a 25-yard pass to Lionel Manuel for a first down. A few plays later, Simms finished the drive with an 11-yard touchdown pass to Manuel on third down and goal.

Washington's best chance to score came in the second quarter, when a 48-yard reception by receiver Art Monk set up a field goal attempt, but it never got off the ground because quarterback Jay Schroeder fumbled the snap. On their next drive, Simms completed a 30-yard pass to tight end Mark Bavaro and later rushed eight yards to the Redskins 1-yard line on a quarterback bootleg. On the next play, running back Joe Morris completed the 51-yard drive by taking it into the end zone from there. Just before halftime, Morris gave the Redskins a scoring opportunity by losing a fumble deep in New York territory. But Washington came up empty when "The Big Blue Wrecking Crew" stopped them on a fourth and 1 conversion attempt.

In the second half, Washington completely abandoned their running game, passing the ball on all but one of their plays, but to no avail. By the end of the game, Schroeder was sacked four times, intercepted once by linebacker Gary Reasons and finished with just 20 of 50 completions for 195 yards.

Washington's lone bright spot of the day was Monk, who caught eight passes for 126 yards.

This was the second postseason meeting between the Redskins and Giants. Washington won the only previous meeting.

Previous playoff games
Washington leads 1–0 in all-time playoff games

1943

Washington Redskins 28 @ New York Giants 0

1943 NFL Eastern Div. playoff

== Super Bowl XXI: New York Giants 39, Denver Broncos 20 ==
Super Bowl XXI – Denver Broncos vs. New York Giants – Game summary

Quarter	1	2	3	4	Total
Broncos (AFC)	10	0	0	10	20
Giants (NFC)	7	2	17	13	39

at Rose Bowl, Pasadena, California

- Date: January 25, 1987
- Game attendance: 101,063
- Referee: Jerry Markbreit
- TV announcers (CBS): Pat Summerall (play-by-play) and John Madden (color commentator)

This was the first Super Bowl meeting between the Broncos and Giants.
