= Al Toon =

American football player (born 1963)

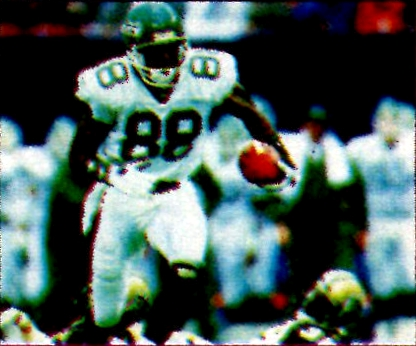
- Toon with the New York Jets in 1986

No. 88
- Position: Wide receiver

Personal information
- Born: April 30, 1963 (age 63); Newport News, Virginia, U.S.
- Listed height: 6 ft 4 in (1.93 m)
- Listed weight: 200 lb (91 kg)

Career information
- High school: Menchville (Newport News, Virginia)
- College: Wisconsin (1981–1984)
- NFL draft: 1985: 1st round, 10th overall pick

Career history
- New York Jets (1985–1992)

Awards and highlights
- First-team All-Pro (1986); Second-team All-Pro (1988); 3× Pro Bowl (1986–1988); NFL receptions leader (1988); New York Jets All-Time Four Decade Team; New York Jets Ring of Honor; 2× First-team All-Big Ten (1983, 1984)

Career NFL statistics
- Receptions: 517
- Receiving yards: 6,605
- Receiving touchdowns: 31
- Stats at Pro Football Reference

Albert Lee Toon Jr. (born April 30, 1963) is an American former professional football player who was a wide receiver for the New York Jets of the National Football League (NFL) for eight seasons. A two-time First-team All-Big Ten pick at the University of Wisconsin, Toon set several school football records for the Wisconsin Badgers. The three-time Pro Bowl selectee played his entire NFL career with the Jets from 1985 to 1992, leading his team and the league in receptions during the late 1980s. He is considered to be among the Jets' all-time greatest wide receivers and overall players in franchise history.

== Early life ==
In high school Toon was well known for his accomplishments in track and field. Toon is one of three Newport News Peninsula District athletes to surpass 50 feet in the triple jump, which he did three times. He reached 23 feet in the long jump. Toon used that jumping ability as a wide receiver on Menchville High School's football team.

Toon played football and ran track at the University of Wisconsin–Madison from 1981 to 1984. Toon set a Big Ten single game receiver record while at the UW and established new school career football records for receptions (131), receiving yards (2,103) and touchdown catches (19) at the end of this three season tenure for the Wisconsin Badgers. He also set Big Ten and school records in track and field in the Triple Jump while qualifying for the Olympic Trials in 1983 in the 110 High Hurdles and the Triple Jump.

== Professional career ==
He was selected by the New York Jets in the first round (10th overall) of the 1985 NFL draft. Toon made three catches for 67 yards in his first game against the Buffalo Bills in the 2nd week on September 15. He made a catch in eleven games, with his first touchdown being against the Indianapolis Colts on November 3 on a 17-yard catch from Ken O'Brien. His first big game came the following week with 156 yards on 10 catches against Miami, the most yards and receptions he had the whole season. In total, he caught 46 passes for 662 yards and three touchdowns. In the playoffs that season against the New England Patriots, he caught nine passes for 93 yards in the 26–14 loss. He had a breakout performance the following year, catching 85 passes for 1,176 yards with eight touchdowns. He was named an All-Pro and to the Pro Bowl while leading the team in receptions, which he would do for the next five seasons. In the Wild Card game that year, Toon caught four passes for 48 yards, which included a touchdown in the second quarter in the 35–15 victory (which ended up being the only postseason victory for Toon as a player). In the Divisional Round against the Cleveland Browns, he caught five passes for 93 yards in the 23–20 loss in double overtime. His large stature in physicality and prowess as a blocker made him a suitable target on a variety of tough assignments for catches.

The following season, he caught 67 passes for 976 yards for five touchdowns in twelve games. He was named to the Pro Bowl once again. The following 1988 season, he caught a league high 93 passes for 1,067 yards and five touchdowns while being named to the Pro Bowl and an All-Pro. He was the first Jet to lead the league in receptions since George Sauer in 1967; Toon is currently the last Jet to lead the league in receptions. He played in just eleven games in 1989, catching 63 passes for 693 yards with two touchdowns. He caught 57 passes for 757 yards in 1990 with six touchdowns under new head coach Bruce Coslet, who called Toon a "consummate team player" while naming him team captain.

He closed out his last full season in 1991 with 74 catches for 963 yards with no touchdowns. Toon made his last playoff appearance in the 1991 Wild Card game against the Houston Oilers. He caught a 10-yard touchdown pass from O'Brien to tie the game for the Jets in the second quarter, but the Jets lost 17–10. Toon caught eight passes for 96 yards. He played in just nine games in 1992 and caught 31 passes for 311 yards and two touchdowns. Toon suffered a concussion against the Denver Broncos after a hit by Michael Brooks on November 8 during a reception that he caught, which went for eight yards while making it 101 straight games with at least one catch as a player. The hit knocked him unconscious and out of the game, which ended up being his last.

On November 28, 1992, Toon announced his retirement from the league, doing so after hearing from a handful of doctors that had each told him that he should not risk another blow to the head, as he had suffered five concussions in the last six seasons and nine in his career. He had set franchise records for receptions in a season (93) and consecutive games (110) at the time of his retirement. He was second in receptions (517) in team history to Don Maynard and third to Maynard and Wesley Walker in receiving yards (6,605).

Toon is one of two retired players in NFL history to play fewer than 110 games and still record over 500 receptions. The other is Hall of Famer Kellen Winslow Sr. Toon had more catches in his first five seasons (355) than any player in league history and reached 400 receptions in 81 games, which was third only to Winslow and Lionel Taylor (each 72) in history. In 2011, he was selected to the Jets Ring of Honor.

== After football ==
In 1995, Toon was one of nine founding members of Capitol Bank, a local community bank on whose board of directors he still serves. He was previously a president of the University of Wisconsin's National W Club, a varsity letter winners club. He also developed AT8 Companies to own, develop, and manage his commercial real estate portfolio. He also became both a Taco Bell franchisee and Hilton Garden Inn franchisee after his eight-year NFL stint. Additionally as a Community Center board member he and his team of locals developed the Boy's and Girl's Club of Dane County.

He probably should go down in history as one of the best wide receivers to ever play for the Jets. There weren't too many better than Al Toon playing anywhere in the NFL.

— Frank Ramos, New York Jets Director of Public Relations, Sack Exchange: The Definitive Oral History of the 1980s New York Jets

Toon served on the board of directors of the National Guardian Life Insurance Company (NGL). He also served on the board of directors of the Green Bay Packers. Toon is now an owner of one of the largest privately owned and operated multifaceted design/build landscape companies in the Midwest, Olson Toon Landscaping, Inc. He is an investor in Wisconsin Burger King Franchise companies since 1992. Toon, who suffered from post-concussion syndrome, has improved to the point that he was able to compete in a triathlon in 2004.

== Personal life ==
Toon is married to Jane and has a son and three daughters. His son, Nick, was a football standout in high school at Middleton, Wisconsin and played as a receiver for the Wisconsin Badgers, as his father did. His son passed him for all-time receptions and yards at the school in 2011. Nicholas Toon was drafted by the New Orleans Saints in the 4th round of the 2012 NFL draft and played four years in the NFL. He now owns and runs an online retail sales business along with a focus on real estate ownership and management with his wife.

His daughter, Kirby, attended UW–Madison as a preferred walk-on in volleyball. Kirby currently is working for Kimberly Clark. His other daughters, Molly and Sydney, also played volleyball. Molly was a Final Four participant while playing volleyball at the University of Michigan and worked for Aerotek in Arizona, while Toon's youngest daughter, Sydney played two seasons of volleyball at University of Wisconsin Whitewater following her prep experience at Middleton High School. His daughter Molly was murdered in an apparent murder-suicide case by her husband in 2021.

== NFL career statistics ==
=== Regular season ===
Year	Team	Games		Receiving				
Year	Team	GP	GS	Rec	Yds	Avg	Lng	TD
1985	NYJ	15	8	46	662	14.4	78	3
1986	NYJ	16	16	85	1,176	13.8	62	8
1987	NYJ	12	11	68	976	14.4	58	5
1988	NYJ	15	15	93	1,067	11.5	42	5
1989	NYJ	11	10	63	693	11.0	37	2
1990	NYJ	14	12	57	757	13.3	46	6
1991	NYJ	15	15	74	963	13.0	32	0
1992	NYJ	9	8	31	311	10.0	32	2
Career		107	95	517	6,605	12.8	78	31
