= Rocky Klever =

American football player (born 1959)

No. 30, 89
- Positions: Tight end, running back

Personal information
- Born: July 10, 1959 (age 67); Portland, Oregon, U.S.
- Listed height: 6 ft 3 in (1.91 m)
- Listed weight: 225 lb (102 kg)

Career information
- High school: West Anchorage (AK)
- College: Montana
- NFL draft: 1982: 9th round, 247th overall pick

Career history
- New York Jets (1982–1988)

Career NFL statistics
- Receptions: 46
- Receiving yards: 514
- Touchdowns: 3
- Stats at Pro Football Reference

Victor Kenneth "Rocky" Klever (born July 10, 1959) is an American former professional football player who was a tight end for the New York Jets of the National Football League (NFL). Raised in Anchorage, Alaska, he played college football for the Montana Grizzlies and was selected by the New York Jets in the ninth round of the 1982 NFL draft. Klever played his entire career with the Jets, over which he served as a backup in a variety of roles and started as a tight end over several seasons.

Klever played as a quarterback at West Anchorage High School, where he won the state title in 1975 and was named to the all-state team (an honorific team composed of the best players in the state) in 1976 and 1977. Attending the University of Montana, he converted to a tailback and set a school record for most career rushing yards which stood for approximately twenty years.

The Jets originally intended Kelver to play as a fullback, though he converted to tight end in 1984. After suffering two herniated discs and missing the entire 1988 season, Klever was waived (an NFL process in which a team releases a player and makes him available to all other NFL teams) prior to the next season.

He was inducted into the hall of fame of the University of Montana in 2016, the Montana Football Hall of Fame in 2018, and the Alaska High School Hall of Fame in 2006. As of 2020, Klever lives in Linwood, New Jersey.

== Early life ==
Victor Kenneth "Rocky" Klever was born on July 10, 1959, in Portland, Oregon, and raised in Anchorage, Alaska. His mother gave him the nickname "Rocky" after the actor Rock Hudson. When his parents divorced, he moved with his mother to Alaska, where he attended West Anchorage High School. In high school, Klever played basketball and football. He also played American Legion baseball.

Klever played football as a quarterback and was named to the honorary Cook Inlet Football Conference team for two years, composed of the best players in the high school conference. His football team won the state title in 1975; Klever himself was selected as an all-state (an honorific team composed of the best players in the state) quarterback in 1976 and 1977, and as an all-state safety in his senior year. He graduated in 1977 and attended the University of Montana, nicknamed the Grizzlies.

== Collegiate career ==
Klever switched positions to a tailback. He finished with 2,228 career rushing yards, which set a school record that stood for twenty years (broken by Yohance Humphery). In 2016, the University of Montana inducted him into their hall of fame.

== Professional career ==
The New York Jets selected Kelver in the ninth round of the 1982 NFL draft with the 247th overall selection. The team believed he would play as a fullback. Klever missed the Jets 1982 season with a broken finger, though according to an article in The New York Times he "showed some impressive moves during rookie training camp". The Jets released him in 1983, though re-signed him later in the season to play on special teams. He played in five games as a fullback in 1983 as the Jets finished with a 7–9 win–loss record, tied for last in the AFC East. The team missed the NFL playoffs.

In 1984, Klever changed positions to tight end and was listed third on the Jets depth chart for the position. He caught his first NFL touchdown pass from Ken O'Brien, which was also O'Brien's first NFL touchdown pass. Klever played in all 16 of the Jets games as he recorded three receptions on five targets for 29 yards and one touchdown; New York finished with a 7–9 record and missed the playoffs. During the team's 1985 season, when Glenn Dennison injured his back, he became the second-string tight end behind Mickey Shuler. Klever finished the year with career highs in receiving yards (183) and touchdowns (2) and again played in all 16 Jets games as the club made the 1985–86 NFL playoffs, losing against the New England Patriots in the Wild Card round. He caught one reception in the game.

In September 1986, the Jets depth chart listed him as "the second-string tight end, third-string quarterback, second-string punter, kicker, kickoff man and third-string holder". The New York Times described him as a "mainstay of the special teams" that same month. For the third consecutive season, Klever played in all 16 of the Jets games, starting a career-high 11, with career highs in targets (33) and receptions (15). New York again made the playoffs, winning the Wild Card game against the Kansas City Chiefs but losing in the Divisional against the Cleveland Browns in overtime 23–20. He started both games as the second-string tight end.

Due to herniated discs, he missed the entire 1988 season, after which he failed a team physical in 1989 due to the herniation and was waived (an NFL process in which a team releases a player and makes him available to all other NFL teams). He finished his NFL career with 46 receptions for 514 yards and three touchdowns. When he played in the NFL, Klever stood at 6 feet 3 inches (191 cm) and weighed 225 pounds (102 kg).

== Personal life ==
No major trading card companies put him on a trading card. After retiring from the NFL, Klever owned a Gold's Gym and worked at a New Jersey high school as an assistant football coach. In 1994, Klever worked as a representative for a T-shirt company in Cape May Court House, New Jersey. He met his former wife, Michele, at the University of Montana. Klever has three daughters and a son. Klever owned a liquor store for twelve years and a bar for fourteen, both of which were located in Wildwood, New Jersey. As of 2009, Klever was divorced.

In December 1999, Sports Illustrated listed Klever as the fifteenth-greatest sports figure from the state of Alaska over the past century. The Montana Football Hall of Fame inducted him to their hall as a part of their 2018 class. The Alaska High School Hall of Fame inducted him to their hall as a part of their inaugural 2006 class. As of 2020, Klever lives in Linwood, New Jersey.
