= Freeman McNeil =

American football player (born 1959)

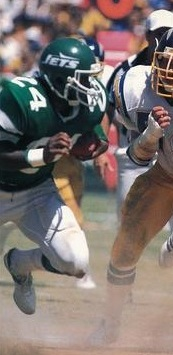
- McNeil (left) with the New York Jets in 1983

No. 24
- Position: Running back

Personal information
- Born: April 22, 1959 (age 67); Jackson, Mississippi, U.S.
- Listed height: 5 ft 11 in (1.80 m)
- Listed weight: 216 lb (98 kg)

Career information
- High school: Phineas Banning (Los Angeles, California)
- College: UCLA (1977–1980)
- NFL draft: 1981: 1st round, 3rd overall pick

Career history
- New York Jets (1981–1992)

Awards and highlights
- First-team All-Pro (1982); 3× Pro Bowl (1982, 1984, 1985); NFL rushing leader (1982); New York Jets Ring of Honor; First-team All-American (1980); Third-team All-American (1979); 2× First-team All-Pac-10 (1979–1980)

Career NFL statistics
- Rushing yards: 8,074
- Rushing average: 4.5
- Rushing touchdowns: 38
- Stats at Pro Football Reference

Freeman McNeil (born April 22, 1959) is an American former professional football player who was a running back for the New York Jets of the National Football League (NFL). He played college football for the UCLA Bruins. He was selected by the Jets in the first round of the 1981 NFL draft with the third overall pick.

== Early life ==
McNeil was born in Jackson, Mississippi. His family later relocated to Los Angeles, California.

McNeil led Banning High School to the 1976 Los Angeles City 4-A football title. At 5 ft 11 in (1.80 m), 214 lb (97 kg) he attended the University of California, Los Angeles (UCLA) as a running back, where he was a two-time All-Pac-10 selection. In his final game, he caught a deflected pass from quarterback Jay Schroeder that was tipped by USC defensive back Jeff Fisher and went 57 yards for the winning touchdown with two minutes left in the Bruins' 20–17 win.

In four seasons at UCLA, McNeil rushed for 3,195 yards and 21 touchdowns, with an average of more than 5 yards per carry.

== Professional career ==
McNeil played in 12 NFL seasons for the New York Jets from 1981 to 1992. During the mid to late 1980s he was a member of the Jets' "Two Headed Monster" backfield along with teammate Johnny Hector, a tandem that ranked among the league's elite. When he retired he was the Jets all-time leading rusher with 8,074 yards; he was surpassed by Curtis Martin and currently ranks second in Jets team history. In 1982, McNeil led the NFL in rushing with 786 yards. He was the first Jet to the lead the league in rushing. He is one of a few running backs in NFL history to average at least 4.0 yards per carry in every season he played.

During the wild card round of the 1982–83 NFL playoffs, McNeil ran for what was thought to be an NFL postseason record 211 yards, while also adding a rushing touchdown and a passing touchdown, during a win over the Cincinnati Bengals. The victory was the Jets' first postseason win in 14 seasons. The following week, it was determined that McNeil had run for 202 yards instead, and that a statistician's error gave credit to McNeil for a run by Bruce Harper in the game's second quarter.

From 1990 to 1992 McNeil was the lead plaintiff in a case won by jury verdict that struck down the NFL's Plan B free agency system, under which teams could protect 37 players. McNeil and the seven other plaintiffs were among the protected players listed by their teams. The system was deemed too restrictive and a violation of antitrust laws. However, Freeman was not one of the four plaintiffs awarded damages. The suit is considered a major step in the achievement of free agency rights by the NFL Players Association.

== NFL career statistics ==
Legend
| | Led the league |
| **Bold** | Career high |

| Year | Team | Games | | Rushing | | | | | | Receiving | | | | | Fumbles | |
| Year | Team | GP | GS | Att | Yds | Avg | Y/G | Lng | TD | Rec | Yds | Avg | Lng | TD | Fum | FR |
|---|---|---|---|---|---|---|---|---|---|---|---|---|---|---|---|---|
| 1981 | NYJ | 11 | 6 | 137 | 623 | 4.5 | 56.6 | 43 | 2 | 18 | 171 | 9.5 | 18 | 1 | 5 | 0 |
| 1982 | NYJ | 9 | 9 | 151 | 786 | 5.2 | 87.3 | 48 | **6** | 16 | 187 | 11.7 | 32 | 1 | 7 | 0 |
| 1983 | NYJ | 9 | 9 | 160 | 654 | 4.1 | 72.7 | 19 | 1 | 21 | 172 | 8.2 | 21 | **3** | 4 | **1** |
| 1984 | NYJ | 12 | 12 | 229 | 1,070 | 4.7 | 89.2 | 53 | 5 | 25 | 294 | 11.8 | 32 | 1 | 4 | **1** |
| 1985 | NYJ | 14 | 13 | **294** | **1,331** | 4.5 | **95.1** | **69** | 3 | 38 | **427** | 11.2 | 25 | 2 | **9** | 0 |
| 1986 | NYJ | 12 | 11 | 214 | 856 | 4.0 | 71.3 | 40 | 5 | **49** | 410 | 8.4 | 26 | 1 | 8 | 0 |
| 1987 | NYJ | 9 | 8 | 121 | 530 | 4.4 | 58.9 | 30 | 0 | 24 | 262 | 10.9 | **57** | 1 | 1 | 0 |
| 1988 | NYJ | **16** | **16** | 219 | 944 | 4.3 | 59.0 | 28 | **6** | 34 | 288 | 8.5 | 25 | 1 | 3 | 0 |
| 1989 | NYJ | 11 | 7 | 80 | 352 | 4.4 | 32.0 | 19 | 2 | 31 | 310 | 10.0 | 25 | 1 | 1 | 0 |
| 1990 | NYJ | **16** | 4 | 99 | 458 | 4.6 | 28.6 | 29 | **6** | 16 | 230 | **14.4** | **59** | 0 | 1 | 0 |
| 1991 | NYJ | 13 | 1 | 51 | 300 | **5.9** | 23.1 | 58 | 2 | 7 | 56 | 8.0 | 13 | 0 | 1 | **1** |
| 1992 | NYJ | 12 | 1 | 43 | 170 | 4.0 | 14.2 | 18 | 0 | 16 | 154 | 9.6 | 32 | 0 | 1 | **1** |
| Career | | 144 | 97 | 1,798 | 8,074 | 4.5 | 56.1 | 69 | 38 | 295 | 2,961 | 10.0 | 59 | 12 | 45 | 4 |

== Honors and awards ==
In 2005, McNeil was inducted into the Nassau County Sports Hall of Fame.
