= Dave Jennings (American football) =

American football punter and sportscaster (1952–2013)

No. 13, 4
- Position: Punter

Personal information
- Born: June 8, 1952; New York, New York, U.S.
- Died: June 19, 2013 (aged 61); Upper Saddle River, New Jersey, U.S.
- Listed height: 6 ft 4 in (1.93 m)
- Listed weight: 203 lb (92 kg)

Career information
- High school: Garden City (Hempstead, New York)
- College: St. Lawrence
- NFL draft: 1974: undrafted

Career history
- Houston Oilers (1974)*; New York Giants (1974–1984); New York Jets (1985–1987)
- * Offseason or practice squad member only

Awards and highlights
- 2× First-team All-Pro (1979, 1980); 3× Second-team All-Pro (1978, 1981, 1982); 4× Pro Bowl (1978–1980, 1982); 2× NFL punting yards leader (1979, 1980); NFL average punting yards leader (1980); PFWA All-Rookie Team (1974); New York Giants Ring of Honor; 53rd greatest New York Giant of all-time

Career NFL statistics
- Punts: 1,154
- Punting yards: 47,567
- Average punt: 41.2
- Longest punt: 73
- Stats at Pro Football Reference

David Tuthill Jennings (June 8, 1952 – June 19, 2013) was an American professional football punter who played in the National Football League (NFL) for 14 seasons, primarily with the New York Giants. He played college football for the St. Lawrence Saints and began his NFL career in 1974 with the Giants, where he spent his first 11 seasons. In his final three seasons, he was a member of the New York Jets.

During his Giants career, Jennings led the league in punting yards twice during the 1979 and 1980 seasons in addition to having the most average punting yards during the latter. Jennings also received four Pro Bowl and two first-team All-Pro selections. After retiring as a player, he was a radio color commentator for Jets and Giants games from 1988 2007. He was inducted to the New York Giants Ring of Honor in 2011 and named among the 100 greatest New York Giants of all-time in 2024.

== Life and career ==
Jennings played both college football and college basketball and graduated from St. Lawrence University in 1974. As a high school student, he did not play football. He lettered in both football and basketball at St. Lawrence, and was inducted to the St. Lawrence Saints hall of fame in 1988.

After graduating from St. Lawrence, Jennings was not drafted, and briefly signed with the Houston Oilers as a practice squad member until he was released and recruited to the New York Giants as a free agent. He played for the Giants from 1974 to 1984, and then moved to play for the New York Jets from 1984 to 1987. During his professional career, he went to the 1978, 1979, 1980, and 1982 Pro Bowl games. He also led the league for total punts in the 1979 season, and in punting yards in both the 1979 and 1980 seasons. He retired after the 1987 season.

After his career playing professional football, Jennings began work as a radio color commentator. He commented on Jets games from 1988 to 2001 for New York sports radio station WFAN. He then moved to commenting on Giants games from 2002 until 2007, when he was replaced by former Giants linebacker Carl Banks. During this time, Jennings worked as a game analyst alongside fellow WFAN Giants announcers Bob Papa and Dick Lynch. In addition to his booth work, Jennings was a part of the Giants pre- and post-game shows, covering player interviews from the locker room.

Dave Jennings was diagnosed with Parkinson's disease in 1995, and publicly revealed his condition in 2005. It was speculated around when he retired from broadcasting in 2008 that fatigue due to Parkinson's may have been the cause of his change in broadcasting roles and eventual retirement. He was inducted into the Giants' Ring of Honor in 2011 as one of the best punters in the franchise's history. Jennings died due to complications with Parkinson's on June 19, 2013, eleven days after his 61st birthday.

== NFL career statistics ==
Legend
	Led the league
**Bold**	Career high

=== Regular season ===
Year	Team	Punting									
Year	Team	GP	Punts	Yds	Net Yds	Lng	Avg	Net Avg	Blk	Ins20	TB
1974	NYG	14	68	2,709	1,991	64	39.8	28.4	2	-	12
1975	NYG	14	76	3,107	2,663	64	40.9	35.0	0	-	4
1976	NYG	14	74	3,054	2,354	61	41.3	30.6	**3**	11	10
1977	NYG	14	100	3,993	3,233	58	39.9	32.3	0	19	4
1978	NYG	**16**	95	3,995	3,151	68	42.1	33.2	0	18	11
1979	NYG	**16**	**104**	**4,445**	**3,818**	72	42.7	36.7	0	19	9
1980	NYG	**16**	94	4,211	3,445	63	**44.8**	36.6	0	16	**13**
1981	NYG	**16**	97	4,198	3,397	62	43.3	35.0	0	19	12
1982	NYG	9	49	2,096	1,829	**73**	42.8	**37.3**	0	16	3
1983	NYG	**16**	84	3,386	3,003	66	40.3	35.3	1	**29**	5
1984	NYG	**16**	90	3,598	2,919	54	40.0	31.4	**3**	22	10
1985	NYJ	**16**	74	2,978	2,499	66	40.2	33.8	0	23	8
1986	NYJ	**16**	85	3,353	3,068	55	39.4	36.1	0	27	6
1987	NYJ	12	64	2,444	2,224	58	38.2	34.8	0	12	6
Career		205	1,154	47,567	39,594	73	41.2	34.0	9	231	113

=== Playoffs ===
Year	Team	Punting									
Year	Team	GP	Punts	Yds	Net Yds	Lng	Avg	Net Avg	Blk	Ins20	TB
1981	NYG	**2**	8	349	311	51	**43.6**	**38.9**	0	2	0
1984	NYG	**2**	10	381	357	47	38.1	35.7	0	**5**	0
1985	NYJ	1	5	192	180	49	38.4	36.0	0	1	0
1986	NYJ	**2**	**17**	**646**	**556**	**55**	38.0	30.9	**1**	1	**1**
Career		7	40	1,568	1,404	55	39.2	34.2	1	9	1
