= Jim Sweeney (American football, born 1962) =

American football player and coach (1962–2022)

No. 53, 66
- Positions: Center, guard, tackle

Personal information
- Born: August 8, 1962; Pittsburgh, Pennsylvania, U.S.
- Died: October 1, 2022 (aged 60); Albany, New York, U.S.
- Listed height: 6 ft 4 in (1.93 m)
- Listed weight: 297 lb (135 kg)

Career information
- High school: Seton-La Salle (Mt. Lebanon, Pennsylvania)
- College: Pittsburgh
- NFL draft: 1984: 2nd round, 37th overall pick

Career history

Playing
- New York Jets (1984–1994); Seattle Seahawks (1995); Pittsburgh Steelers (1996–1999)

Coaching
- Duquesne (OL) (2000–2002); Peters Township HS (OL) (2003–2006); South Fayette HS (OL) (2007–2010); Albany (OL) (2014–2021)

Awards and highlights
- PFWA All-Rookie Team (1984); Third-team All-American (1983); First-team All-East (1983)

Career NFL statistics
- Games played: 228
- Games started: 176
- Fumble recoveries: 2
- Stats at Pro Football Reference

James Joseph Sweeney (August 8, 1962 – October 1, 2022) was an American professional football player who was a center and guard for 16 seasons in the National Football League (NFL). After his playing career, he became an assistant coach.

== Early life and college ==
Sweeney was born in Pittsburgh and attended Seton-La Salle Catholic High School in Mt. Lebanon, Pennsylvania. At the University of Pittsburgh, he played all five offensive line positions and tight end for the Pittsburgh Panthers from 1980 to 1983, including two seasons as starter. As a senior in 1983, he played at center and guard, and he won second-team All-American honors from The Sporting News. Sweeney graduated from Pittsburgh in 1984 with a Bachelor of Science in sociology and administration of justice.

== Professional playing career ==
The New York Jets selected Sweeney in the second round, with the 37th overall selection in the 1984 NFL draft. Sweeney played for the Jets from 1984 to 1994. With the Jets, he played in ten games with two starts as a rookie in 1984. That year, he was selected as a member of the Pro Football Writers of America NFL All-Rookie Team. In 1985, he started all 16 games at left guard. In 1986 and 1987, Sweeney was the starting left tackle. From 1988 to 1994, he started at center for the Jets. The Jets released Sweeney in March 1995.

Sweeney signed a three-year contract for $2.8 million with the Seattle Seahawks. In 1995, Sweeney started all 16 games at center. He played the final four seasons of his career with his hometown Pittsburgh Steelers from 1996 to 1999, this time mostly off the bench with one start each in 1997 and 1998.

== Coaching career ==
From 2000 to 2002, Sweeney was the offensive line coach at Duquesne University under head coach Greg Gattuso. He later coached at the high school level in the Pittsburgh area, first with Peters Township High School in McMurray as offensive line coach from 2003 to 2006. He then served as offensive line coach for South Fayette High School from 2007 to 2010, where he was part of the 2010 Western Pennsylvania Interscholastic Athletic League championship team.

In 2010, Sweeney worked for the Arizona Cardinals coaching the offensive line during training camp as a temporary fill-in for Russ Grimm. In 2011, he participated in the NFL and NCAA coaching internship program at Frostburg State University. He was offensive line consultant for the Pittsburgh Power of the Arena Football League in 2013.

On January 14, 2014, Sweeney became offensive line coach at SUNY Albany, in his second coaching job under Greg Gattuso. After the 2021 season, Albany opted not to renew Sweeney's contract.

== Personal life and death ==
Sweeney died on October 1, 2022, at age 60.
