= Matt Monger =

American football player (born 1961)

No. 58, 57
- Position: Linebacker

Personal information
- Born: November 15, 1961 (age 65); Denver, Colorado, U.S.
- Listed height: 6 ft 1 in (1.85 m)
- Listed weight: 235 lb (107 kg)

Career information
- High school: Miami (OK)
- College: Oklahoma State
- NFL draft: 1985: 8th round, 208th overall pick

Career history
- New York Jets (1985–1988); Houston Oilers (1989)*; Buffalo Bills (1989–1990)
- * Offseason or practice squad member only

Career NFL statistics
- Games played: 56
- Games started: 1
- Fumble recoveries: 3
- Stats at Pro Football Reference

Matt Monger (born November 15, 1961) is an American former professional football player who was a linebacker in the National Football League (NFL). He played college football for the Oklahoma State Cowboys and was selected by the New York Jets in the eighth round of the 1985 NFL draft. He played for the Jets from 1985 to 1987 and for the Buffalo Bills from 1989 to 1990. During his time in the NFL, Matt completed his MBA and begin working as a Financial Advisor with Merrill Lynch.

=== High School Sports ===
Monger attended Miami High School (the Wardogs) in Miami, Oklahoma. He was a multi-sport athlete. In football (running back / fullback), he was named All-State by the Oklahoma Coaches Association his senior year. He also led the state in rushing in their division.

In wrestling, he was named All-State by the Oklahoma Coaches Association his senior year (the first Wardog wrestler to earn this honor), and finished as the Class 4A state runner-up in the 178-pound weight class.

After graduating high school, he did not receive any football scholarship offers and decided to walk on at Oklahoma State University, where a year before, Jimmy Johnson was named the program's head coach.

=== College Sports - Oklahoma State University Football ===
Monger walked on to Oklahoma State's football team in 1980. He did not make the active game day roster during his first year. Johnson has assembled a coaching staff that would later have a lot of success in college and the NFL (including Dave Wannstedt; Butch Davis; Pat Jones; Larry Coker, who later won a national championship as the University of Miami's head coach; and Reggie Herring).

After his first year on in the program, Johnston told Monger that he might be better of concentrating on his studies. Monger refused to quit and continue his quest to play for the Cowboys. While continuing to practice, he was moved from the offense to defense. And through a series of injuries, he found himself promoted to the game day squad, primarily due to the belief in him by Reggie Herring (whose belief, Monger has opening stated, changed the trajectory of his playing career).

Monger went on the lead the team in tackles in 1983 and 1984. In 1984, he had 175 tackles which (to this day, November 18, 2026) is still number two on the all-time tackle list for the Oklahoma State Cowboys.

=== Professional Sports - NFL ===
Monger was drafted by the New York Jets in the eighth round of the 1985 NFL Draft, the 208th pick. After four season with the Jets, he spend one season with the Houston Oilers before finishing his NFL career playing three seasons with the Buffalo Bills. One of those seasons included an appearance with the Bill in the 1991 Super Bowl versus the New York Giants.
