= Johnny Lynn =

American football player and coach (born 1956)

John Lynn
Profile
- Position: Defensive back

Personal information
- Born: December 19, 1956 (age 69); Los Angeles, California, U.S.
- Listed height: 6 ft 0 in (1.83 m)
- Listed weight: 196 lb (89 kg)

Career information
- High school: John Muir (Pasadena, California)
- College: UCLA
- NFL draft: 1979: 4th round, 98th overall pick

Career history

Playing
- New York Jets (1979–1986)

Coaching
- Arizona (1987–1993) Assistant coach; Tampa Bay Buccaneers (1994–1995) Defensive backs coach; San Francisco 49ers (1996) Defensive backs coach; New York Giants (1997–2001) Defensive backs coach; New York Giants (2002–2003) Defensive coordinator; Baltimore Ravens (2004–2005) Defensive backs coach; San Francisco 49ers (2006–2008) Defensive backs coach; San Francisco 49ers (2009–2010) Defensive backs coach; Philadelphia Eagles (2011) Cornerbacks coach; Oakland Raiders (2012–2014) Defensive backs coach; Denver Broncos (2017) Assistant defensive backs coach

Career NFL statistics
- Games played: 97
- Games started: 48
- Interceptions: 17
- Stats at Pro Football Reference
- Coaching profile at Pro Football Reference

Johnnie Ross Lynn (born December 19, 1956) is an American football coach and former player. He was a defensive back who played for the New York Jets for seven seasons from 1979 to 1986. He became a secondary coach after his playing career ended. He coached for the Tampa Bay Buccaneers from 1994 to 1995, the San Francisco 49ers in 1996, the New York Giants from 1997 to 2003 (where he was defensive coordinator from 2002 to 2003), the Baltimore Ravens from 2004 to 2005, the 49ers again from 2006 to 2010, the Philadelphia Eagles in 2011, the Oakland Raiders from 2012 to 2014, and most recently for the Denver Broncos in 2017.
