= Joe Fields =

American football player (born 1953)

No. 65, 69
- Positions: Center, guard

Personal information
- Born: November 14, 1953 (age 72); Woodbury, New Jersey, U.S.
- Listed height: 6 ft 2 in (1.88 m)
- Listed weight: 250 lb (113 kg)

Career information
- High school: Gloucester Catholic (Gloucester City, New Jersey)
- College: Widener
- NFL draft: 1975: 14th round, 349th overall pick

Career history
- New York Jets (1975–1987); New York Giants (1988)

Awards and highlights
- First-team All-Pro (1982); 2× Second-team All-Pro (1981, 1985); 2× Pro Bowl (1981, 1982)

Career NFL statistics
- Games played: 186
- Games started: 155
- Stats at Pro Football Reference

Joseph Charles Fields Jr. (born November 14, 1953) is an American former professional football player who was a center and guard in the National Football League (NFL) for the New York Jets and the New York Giants.

== Early life and education ==
Fields was raised in Deptford Township, New Jersey and graduated from Gloucester Catholic High School in Gloucester City, New Jersey in 1971.

== NFL career ==
Fields played college football at Widener University in Chester, Pennsylvania and was drafted in the 14th round of the 1975 NFL draft by the New York Jets. Fields was a two-time Pro Bowl selection during the 1981 and 1982 seasons. He played for the Jets for 12 years before spending his final year in the National Football League with the New York Giants in 1988. Following the 1988 season, he was not offered a contract by the Giants and retired.

== Post-retirement ==
In 1989, he released a book, Nose to Nose: Survival in the Trenches of the NFL, co-authored with his friend and former roommate Joe Klecko. Klecko and Fields had lined up across from each other in Jets' practices for eleven years.

He became director of contractor services for a New Jersey patio and stonework company. and resides in Woodstown, New Jersey.

In 2016, Fields was inducted into the Widener University Athletic Hall of Fame.
