= Dennis Bligen =

American football player (born 1962)

No. 23, 38
- Position: Running back

Personal information
- Born: March 3, 1962 (age 64); Manhattan, New York City, New York, U.S.
- Listed height: 5 ft 11 in (1.80 m)
- Listed weight: 215 lb (98 kg)

Career information
- High school: Murry Bergtraum (Manhattan)
- College: St. John's
- NFL draft: 1984: undrafted

Career history
- New York Jets (1984–1986); Tampa Bay Buccaneers (1986); New York Jets (1987)

Career NFL statistics
- Rushing yards: 300
- Rushing average: 4.1
- Touchdowns: 3
- Stats at Pro Football Reference

Dennis Bligen (born March 3, 1962) is an American former professional football player who was a running back in the National Football League (NFL). He played college football for the St. John's Red Storm. He played in the NFL for the New York Jets from 1984 to 1986 and in 1987 and for the Tampa Bay Buccaneers in 1986.
