= Tony Paige (American football) =

American football player (born 1962)

No. 49
- Position: Running back

Personal information
- Born: October 14, 1962 (age 64); Washington, D.C., U.S.
- Listed height: 5 ft 10 in (1.78 m)
- Listed weight: 225 lb (102 kg)

Career information
- High school: DeMatha Catholic (Hyattsville, Maryland)
- College: Virginia Tech
- NFL draft: 1984: 6th round, 149th overall pick

Career history
- New York Jets (1984–1986); Detroit Lions (1987–1989); Miami Dolphins (1990–1992)

Career NFL statistics
- Rushing yards: 853
- Rushing average: 3.1
- Total touchdowns: 29
- Stats at Pro Football Reference

Anthony Ricardo Paige (born October 14, 1962) is an American former professional football player who was a running back for nine seasons with the New York Jets, Detroit Lions, and Miami Dolphins of the National Football League (NFL). He played college football for the Virginia Tech Hokies. Paige was selected by the Jets in the sixth round of the 1984 NFL draft. He led the Jets in touchdowns (10) as a rookie starter. After nine seasons in the league, he retired at the age of 30.

== Playing career ==
Paige’s football career began at DeMatha Catholic High School in Maryland, where he would later be elected into the school’s Hall of Fame. He then donned the Chicago maroon and burnt orange at Virginia Tech. Paige is considered one of the finest blocking and receiving fullbacks to ever play for the Hokies and was also inducted into the school’s Sports Hall of Fame.

== Agent and broadcasting career ==
Paige has been an NFL agent since 1994, representing players like Cam Newton of the Carolina Panthers, Randy Starks of the Miami Dolphins and 4-time Pro Bowl selection Kris Jenkins, now a Studio Analyst for SNY and CBS. He is with the Washington, D.C.–based representation firm Perennial Sports and Entertainment.
