= Ken O'Brien =

American football player and coach (born 1960)

No. 7
- Position: Quarterback

Personal information
- Born: November 27, 1960 (age 65); Rockville Centre, New York, U.S.
- Listed height: 6 ft 4 in (1.93 m)
- Listed weight: 210 lb (95 kg)

Career information
- High school: Jesuit (Carmichael, California)
- College: Sacramento State, UC Davis
- NFL draft: 1983: 1st round, 24th overall pick

Career history

Playing
- New York Jets (1983–1992); Green Bay Packers (1993)*; Philadelphia Eagles (1993)
- * Offseason or practice squad member only

Coaching
- UC Davis (1997) Quarterbacks coach; USC (1998–1999) Quarterbacks coach

Awards and highlights
- 2× Pro Bowl (1985, 1991); NFL passer rating leader (1985)

Career NFL statistics
- Passing attempts: 3,602
- Passing completions: 2,110
- Completion percentage: 58.6%
- TD–INT: 128–98
- Passing yards: 25,094
- Passer rating: 80.4
- Stats at Pro Football Reference
- College Football Hall of Fame

Kenneth John O'Brien Jr. (born November 27, 1960) is an American former professional football player who was a quarterback in the National Football League (NFL) for the New York Jets and Philadelphia Eagles. One of the six quarterbacks in the famed quarterback class of 1983, O'Brien was the first quarterback in the franchise history of the Jets to finish with the highest passer rating in a season. He held the team record for most consecutive pass completions (17) in a game. In 1997, he was inducted into the College Football Hall of Fame.

== Early life and college ==
O'Brien played for Jesuit High School in Carmichael, California.

O'Brien started his collegiate football career in 1978 at Sacramento State as a reserve before transferring to University of California, Davis to play under coach Jim Sochor. In his senior year, 1982, he was an NCAA Division II All-American. He led UCD to a 10–0 regular season mark and to the Division II championship game. He was ranked #2 in total offense and #3 in passing efficiency in Division II. He also won the Babe Slater Award for being the most outstanding male athlete at UC Davis.

O'Brien was the first player to play for both teams in the Causeway Classic.

O'Brien was selected as All-Far Western Conference QB three times and was selected to the College Football Hall of Fame in 1997.

== Professional career ==
The New York Jets selected O'Brien as the 24th pick in the first round of the 1983 NFL draft, shocking observers who expected the team to choose quarterback Dan Marino, a future member of the Pro Football Hall of Fame, who was selected three picks later by the Miami Dolphins. The Jets fans who attended the draft, held in New York City, were surprised and outraged by the choice; O'Brien was so obscure that New York television reporter Sal Marchiano twice mangled his name while reporting on fan reaction to the draft. (O'Brien said after his retirement, "Who blames [the fans], right? Who, in New York, has heard of Cal, University of California, Davis? Nobody ... I'm not sure I would have reacted any differently. Heck, some of my cousins grew up as Jets fans. They were probably doing the same thing.") Don Shula, who coached the division rival Miami Dolphins (which drafted Dan Marino later in the round) famously asked "Who's he?" Years later, Mike Hickey, a Jets personnel director stated that O'Brien was chosen because he felt that he was smart enough to run the complicated offense of first-year head coach Joe Walton (hired after the firing of defensive-minded Walt Michaels), as O'Brien was reported to have an IQ of 130 to go along with an arm that would be ideal for Shea Stadium and its wind (the Jets moved away from Shea the season after drafting O'Brien to less windy Giants Stadium). Hickey also stated that the Pittsburgh Steelers (three picks ahead of New York) not selecting hometown Marino was a key factor and that the final choice was between O'Brien and Darrell Green (later chosen by Washington and a future Hall of Famer).

In 1985, O'Brien was the highest-rated quarterback in the NFL, finishing the season with a rating of 96.2 while having the lowest interception rate; he was selected to the Pro Bowl that year. The Jets went 11–5 that year to reach the postseason for the first time since 1982. He went 13-of-17 for 149 yards against the New England Patriots with a touchdown and an interception as the Jets lost 26–14. O'Brien later led the NFL with the lowest interception rate in 1987 and 1988.

On September 21, 1986, O'Brien engaged in a famous duel with Dan Marino when the Jets played the Miami Dolphins. The eventual 51–45 victory saw a combined total of combined for 927 yards and ten passing touchdowns, with O'Brien throwing for 479 with four touchdowns. On November 2 of that same year, he set history against the Seattle Seahawks. He threw for 431 yards while going 26-for-32 to become the first quarterback to achieve a perfect passer rating (158.3) while throwing for 400 yards. This would not be done again until Nick Foles in 2013. O'Brien did a second game with a perfect rating in the December 23, 1990 game against the New England Patriots by going 11-of-12 for 210 yards with two touchdowns.

O'Brien threw 25 touchdown passes for the second-straight season and helped the Jets post a 10–6 record in 1986, but a sore arm bothered him down the stretch, which saw the team lose five games in a row to stumble into the playoffs. Pat Ryan (who won two games as starter) started in the wild-card round versus Kansas City, which they won. O'Brien only came in action for the divisional round game versus Cleveland when Ryan got hurt early. O'Brien went 11-of-19 for 134 yards while being sacked six times with no touchdowns as the Browns won in double overtime.

O'Brien went to the Pro Bowl twice, in 1985 and 1991. He returned to the playoffs in the latter year as the Jets faced the Houston Oilers. He went 21-of-31 for 221 yards with a touchdown and three interceptions as the Jets lost 17–10. He retired after spending the 1993 season with the Philadelphia Eagles where he started only four games and mostly served as a backup for Randall Cunningham and Bubby Brister. Despite his occasional flashes with over 25,000 passing yards, O'Brien had a quarterback record of 50–59–1 as a starter, which saw him start over ten games for a team seven times while having a winning record just three times.

== NFL career statistics ==
Legend
	Pro Bowl selection
	Led the league
**Bold**	Career high

Year	Team	Games			Passing								
Year	Team	GP	GS	Record	Cmp	Att	Pct	Yds	Avg	TD	Int	Lng	Rtg
1984	NYJ	10	5	1–4	116	203	57.1	1,402	6.9	6	7	49	74.0
1985	NYJ	**16**	**16**	**11−5**	297	488	60.9	**3,888**	**8.0**	**25**	8	**96**	**96.2**
1986	NYJ	15	14	8−6	**300**	482	**62.2**	3,690	7.7	**25**	20	83	85.8
1987	NYJ	12	12	5−7	234	393	59.5	2,696	6.9	13	8	59	82.8
1988	NYJ	14	12	6−5–1	236	424	55.7	2,567	6.1	15	7	50	78.6
1989	NYJ	15	12	4−8	288	477	60.4	3,346	7.0	12	18	57	74.3
1990	NYJ	**16**	**16**	6–10	226	411	55.0	2,855	6.9	13	10	69	77.3
1991	NYJ	**16**	**16**	8–8	287	**489**	58.7	3,300	6.7	10	11	53	76.6
1992	NYJ	10	3	1–2	55	98	56.1	642	6.6	5	6	55	67.6
1993	PHI	5	4	0−4	71	137	51.8	708	5.2	4	**3**	41	67.4
Career		129	110	50–59–1	2,110	3,602	58.6	25,094	7.0	128	98	96	80.4

== Coaching career ==
After retiring, O'Brien had a stint as an assistant coach for the University of Southern California, where he coached Heisman Trophy winner and former Cincinnati Bengals, Oakland Raiders, and Arizona Cardinals quarterback Carson Palmer.

== Personal life ==
O'Brien and his wife Stacey have four children, with his first grandchild coming in 2018. As of 2019, O'Brien works at IWP Wealth Management in Manhattan Beach, California.

== See also ==
- List of NFL quarterbacks who have posted a perfect passer rating
