= Billy Griggs (American football) =

American football player (born 1962)

No. 81
- Position: Tight end

Personal information
- Born: August 4, 1962 (age 64); Camden, New Jersey, U.S.
- Listed height: 6 ft 3 in (1.91 m)
- Listed weight: 230 lb (104 kg)

Career information
- High school: Pennsauken (NJ)
- College: Virginia
- NFL draft: 1984: 8th round, 203rd overall pick

Career history
- New York Jets (1984–1989); Kansas City Chiefs (1989)*; Pittsburgh Steelers (1990)*
- * Offseason or practice squad member only

Career NFL statistics
- Receptions: 25
- Receiving yards: 262
- Receiving touchdowns: 1
- Stats at Pro Football Reference

William Edward Griggs III (born August 4, 1962) is an American former professional football tight end for the New York Jets. Griggs went to college at the University of Virginia and played tight end under the legendary UVA head coach George Welsh. He played for the Jets from 1984 to 1989, catching 25 passes for 262 yards. His first NFL reception was a touchdown catch in the Jets victory over the Kansas City Chiefs in the 1986 playoffs. He served as the offensive line and defensive line coach at Pennsauken High School in Pennsauken, New Jersey in 2011.

Griggs is the older brother of the late former NFL outside linebacker, David Griggs.
