= Kurt Sohn =

American football player (born 1957)

No. 87
- Position: Wide receiver

Personal information
- Born: June 26, 1957 (age 69); Ithaca, New York, U.S.
- Listed height: 5 ft 11 in (1.80 m)
- Listed weight: 180 lb (82 kg)

Career information
- High school: Huntington (NY)
- College: Nassau Community College; Fordham; NC State
- NFL draft: 1980: undrafted

Career history
- Los Angeles Rams (1980)*; New York Jets (1981–1988)
- * Offseason or practice squad member only

Career NFL statistics
- Receptions: 79
- Receiving yards: 1,018
- Touchdowns: 10
- Stats at Pro Football Reference

Kurt Sohn (born June 26, 1957) is an American former professional football player who was a wide receiver for eight seasons with the New York Jets of the National Football League (NFL) from 1981 to 1988. After growing up in Huntington (New York) and excelling in both football and lacrosse, he graduated from Huntington High School (New York) in 1975. He went to Fordham and Nassau Community College. He finished his professional career with 79 receptions for 1,018 yards and 10 touchdowns. He was a valuable special teams player as well, serving as both a punt and kick returner. He had 68 PRs for 519 yards and 63 KRs for 1,164 yards.

Kurt Sohn is currently married and lives in Palm Beach Gardens, FL. He has three daughters, Kerri, April and Wendy, with his first wife and a son with his current wife.
