= Carl Howard =

American football player (born 1961)

No. 21, 25, 28
- Positions: Cornerback, Safety

Personal information
- Born: September 20, 1961 (age 65); Newark, New Jersey, U.S.
- Listed height: 6 ft 2 in (1.88 m)
- Listed weight: 188 lb (85 kg)

Career information
- High school: Irvington (Irvington, New Jersey)
- College: Rutgers
- NFL draft: 1984: undrafted

Career history
- Dallas Cowboys (1984); Houston Oilers (1985); Tampa Bay Buccaneers (1985); New York Jets (1985–1990)

Career NFL statistics
- Interceptions: 5
- Fumble recoveries: 1
- Sacks: 3
- Stats at Pro Football Reference

Carl Delano Howard, Jr. (born September 20, 1961) is an American former professional football player who was a cornerback in the National Football League (NFL) for the Dallas Cowboys, Tampa Bay Buccaneers, and New York Jets. He played college football for the Rutgers Scarlet Knights.

== Early life ==
Howard attended Irvington High School, where he practiced football, baseball and track.

He walked on at Rutgers University in 1980. He became a three-year starter at left cornerback and is mostly remembered for returning a blocked punt against the United States Military Academy for a 12-yard touchdown.

== Professional career ==
=== Dallas Cowboys ===
Howard was signed as an undrafted free agent by the Dallas Cowboys after the 1984 NFL draft. He was used as a backup cornerback and special teams, before being placed on the injured reserve list on November 20. He was waived on September 2, 1985.

=== Houston Oilers ===
On September 4, 1985, he was claimed off waivers by the Houston Oilers, before being released on September 7.

=== Tampa Bay Buccaneers ===
Howard was signed as a free agent by the Tampa Bay Buccaneers on October 15, 1985. He was mainly used in special teams, until being cut on November 12 to make room for Ricky Easmon.

=== New York Jets ===
On December 5, 1985, he signed as a free agent with the New York Jets. After being waived on August 30, 1986, he was later re-signed during the season and played in 10 games (3 starts). In the playoffs against the Cleveland Browns, he was involved in a late hit penalty on quarterback Bernie Kosar, that is cited by many observers as the turning point in the 20–23 overtime loss. Although Mark Gastineau received the penalty officially, Howard also hit the player. He also had a 25-yard pass interference penalty in the game.

In 1987, he started 9 games at right cornerback. He was waived on September 12, 1989, after giving up a 31-yard reception that set up the winning touchdown in the season opener. He was re-signed 7 days later.

Howard was cut on August 27, 1990, only to be re-signed on September 19. He was released on October 10.
