= Harry Hamilton =

American football player (born 1962)

No. 39
- Position: Safety

Personal information
- Born: November 29, 1962 (age 63); Jamaica, New York, U.S.
- Listed height: 6 ft 0 in (1.83 m)
- Listed weight: 190 lb (86 kg)

Career information
- High school: Nanticoke (PA) Fine
- College: Penn State
- NFL draft: 1984: 7th round, 176th overall pick

Career history
- New York Jets (1984–1987); Tampa Bay Buccaneers (1988–1991)

Awards and highlights
- National champion (1982); Third-team All-American (1983); First-team All-East (1983); Second-team All-East (1982)

Career NFL statistics
- Interceptions: 23
- Fumble recoveries: 10
- Sacks: 1
- Stats at Pro Football Reference

Harry Edwin Hamilton (born November 29, 1962) is an American former professional football player who was a safety in the National Football League (NFL). Hamilton was the first Black African-American to graduate from John S. Fine High School, Nanticoke, Pennsylvania. He played college football for the Penn State Nittany Lions.

== Early life ==
His father Stan Hamilton was a civil rights activist in New York in the 1960s and a writer of Sesame Street. In 1972, the family moved to a horse farm owned by Stan Hamilton and his father-in-law, after a flood damaged their house in Wilkes-Barre. They were the only black people in the area and Hamilton suffered abuse at school, being called racial slurs and seeing a burning cross on a bonfire during a football pep rally. He set several track records at school and proved to be an adept Western-style horse rider and football player. After graduating, the family moved back to Wilkes-Barre.

== Football career ==
Having graduated with honors, he was recruited by a number of colleges for his excellence in academics and athletics before selecting Penn State. During his collegiate career, he was an Academic All-American safety at Penn State University following the 1982 National Championship season and 1983 seasons. After which, he played eight seasons as a safety in the National Football League with the New York Jets and Tampa Bay Buccaneers before retiring in 1993.

== Post-football career ==
During his professional football career, Hamilton attended law school and immediately put his Juris Doctor degree to work for legal services in Tampa, Florida before embarking on a career in the United States Army Judge Advocate General's Corps.

In March 2018, Hamilton was charged with a number of offenses including burglary, criminal trespassing, a misdemeanor count of simple assault and two summary offenses of harassment after he confronted his son about drug abuse. He was also accused of forcing his way into his ex-wife's home and assaulting his son. Hamilton was arraigned and released on $25,000 unsecured bail.
