= Russell Carter (American football) =

American football player (born 1962)

No. 27, 29
- Position: Cornerback

Personal information
- Born: February 10, 1962 (age 64); Ardmore, Pennsylvania, U.S.
- Listed height: 6 ft 2 in (1.88 m)
- Listed weight: 195 lb (88 kg)

Career information
- High school: Lower Merion (Ardmore)
- College: SMU
- NFL draft: 1984: 1st round, 10th overall pick

Career history
- New York Jets (1984–1987); Los Angeles Raiders (1988–1989)

Awards and highlights
- Unanimous All-American (1983); SWC Defensive Player of the Year (1983); 2× First-team All-SWC (1982, 1983)

Career NFL statistics
- Sacks: 6
- Interceptions: 4
- Fumble recoveries: 3
- Stats at Pro Football Reference

Russell Edmonds Carter, Jr. (born February 10, 1962) is an American former professional football player who was a safety in the National Football League (NFL) for six seasons during the 1980s. Carter played college football for Southern Methodist University, and then played professionally for the New York Jets and Los Angeles Raiders of the NFL.

== Early life and education ==
Born and raised in Ardmore, Pennsylvania, a suburb of Philadelphia, Carter attended Lower Merion High School. He played college football at Southern Methodist University in Dallas, Texas, from 1980 to 1983. As a senior, was recognized as a consensus first-team All-American.

Carter was also an All-American sprinter for the SMU Mustangs track and field team, finishing 2nd in the 4 × 400 m at the 1983 NCAA Indoor Track and Field Championships.

== Professional career ==
The New York Jets selected Carter in the first round (tenth pick overall) of the 1984 NFL draft. He played for the Jets from 1984 to 1987. He spent his final two NFL seasons with the Los Angeles Raiders in 1988 and 1989. In six NFL seasons, Carter appeared in sixty-four games, started forty-seven of them, intercepted four passes, and recovered three fumbles.
