= Amazing-Man =

Amazing-Man may refer to:

- Amazing-Man (Centaur Publications) (John Aman), created by Bill Everett in 1939 published by Centaur Publications through the 1940s
- Amazing-Man (DC Comics), a name used by a succession of three characters
- Amazing Man, an episode of the American television drama series Highway to Heaven

== See also ==
- 'Mazing Man, a comedic DC Comics character created in 1986
