= Rise and Walk: The Dennis Byrd Story =

1994 American drama film directed by Michael Dinner

- Based on: Rise and Walk: The Trial and Triumph of Dennis Byrd by: Dennis Byrd; Mike D'Orso
- Screenplay by: Sally Nemeth; John Miglis; Mark Levin
- Directed by: Michael Dinner
- Starring: Peter Berg; Kathryn Morris; Wolfgang Bodison; Johann Carlo; Steve Fitchpatrick; Patrick Warburton
- Composer: W. G. Snuffy Walden
- Country of origin: United States
- Original language: English

Production
- Producer: Paul Kurta
- Cinematography: Tim Suhrstedt
- Editors: Warren Bowman; James Austin Stewart
- Running time: 88 minutes
- Production company: Fox West Pictures

Original release
- Network: Fox
- Release: February 28, 1994

Rise and Walk: The Dennis Byrd Story is a 1994 American drama film directed by Michael Dinner and written by Sally Nemeth, John Miglis and Mark Levin. It is based on the 1993 book Rise and Walk: The Trial and Triumph of Dennis Byrd by Dennis Byrd and Mike D'Orso. The film stars Peter Berg, Kathryn Morris, Wolfgang Bodison, Johann Carlo, Steve Fitchpatrick and Patrick Warburton. The film premiered on Fox on February 28, 1994.

== Plot ==
The narrative of the film centers around former New York Jets defensive end Dennis Byrd and his attempts to walk again after he was partially paralyzed after suffering a fractured vertebra in his neck after colliding with teammate Scott Mersereau while attempting to sack former Kansas City Chiefs quarterback Dave Krieg in a game in November 1992.

== Cast ==
- Peter Berg as Dennis Byrd
- Kathryn Morris as Angela
- Wolfgang Bodison as Marvin Washington
- Johann Carlo as Joanne
- Steve Fitchpatrick as Jeff Lageman
- Patrick Warburton as Scott Mersereau
- Carrie Snodgress as Mrs. Byrd
- Zakes Mokae as Harding
- Steven Anderson
- William Forward
- Dennis Howard
- Allan Royal
- Richie Allan
- Bert Remsen as Mr. Robinson
- Dan Lauria as The Coach
- James Troesh as Mr. Montrose
- Ryan Slater as Young Dennis
- Brent O'Plotnik as Young Doug
- Jay Michael Ferguson as Young Danny
- Johnny Judkins as Doug
- David Harrod as Danny
- McKenzie Smith as Ashtin
- Matthew Tompkins as Eddie
- David Eversole as Tulsa Coach
- Juli Erickson as Grandma
- Larry Flynn as Cooley
- Mitch Jelniker as Mike Jacklin
- Reverend McNabb as Himself
- Walker Randall as Darnell
- Allan Graf as Jets Assistant Coach
- David Allen as Lineman
- Reese Morrison as Kansas City QB
- Ryan Phillips as Tulsa Defensive Capt.
- Keith Warrior as Tulsa Quarterback
- Nathan Wooten as Dodson
- William Pulley as Angela's Father
- Wanda Wooley as Angela's Mother
