= Bellevue East High School =

Coordinates: 41°08′46″N 95°54′13″W

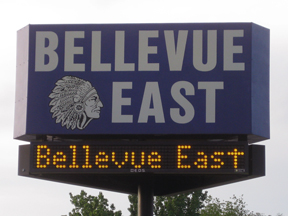

Location
- 1401 High School Drive; Bellevue, Nebraska 68005

Information
- School type: High school
- Founded: 1962
- School district: Bellevue P.S.
- Superintendent: Jeff Rippe
- Principal: Jeffery Wagner
- Staff: 98.20 (FTE)
- Grades: 9-12
- Enrollment: 1,482 (2018–19)
- Student to teacher ratio: 15.09
- Language: English
- Area: Bellevue, Nebraska
- Colors: Purple, silver and white
- Mascot: Chieftains
- Team name: Chieftains
- Website: Bellevue East HS

Bellevue East High School is a four-year public secondary school in Bellevue, a suburb south of Omaha, Nebraska. The current facility opened in 1962 as Bellevue High School and was renamed Bellevue East in 1977, following the opening of Bellevue West. It is part of the Bellevue Public School System, with approximately 1,450 students in grades 9 through 12.

== Athletics ==
State championships
Season	Sport	Number of championships	Year
Fall	Football	0	
Fall	Cross country, boys	0	
Fall	Cross country, girls	0	
Fall	Volleyball	0	
Fall	Softball	0	
Fall	Golf, girls	0	
Fall	Tennis, boys	0	
Fall	Unified bowling	0	
Winter	Basketball, boys	0	
Winter	Basketball, girls	3	2002, 2006, 2011
Winter	Swimming & Diving, boys	0	
Winter	Swimming & Diving, girls	0	
Winter	Wrestling, boys	3	1961, 1964, 1972
Winter	Wrestling, girls	0	
Winter	Bowling, boys	0	
Winter	Bowling, girls	0	
Spring	Baseball	0	
Spring	Soccer, boys	0	
Spring	Soccer, girls	0	
Spring	Track and field, boys	1	1991
Spring	Track and field, girls	3	1991, 1992, 1993
Spring	Golf, boys	0	
Spring	Tennis, girls	0	
Total		10	

Bellevue East's marching band won the Class A championship in the 2021 NSBA state marching contest.

== Performing arts ==
BEHS Vocal Music is under the direction of Carly Fox and has one competitive show choir. including the mixed-section group "Take II" .

Currently under the direction of Jeremy Krug and Kaitlyn Keck, BEHS has seven bands along with many smaller ensembles. Those being their Marching Band, Wind Ensemble, Symphonic Band, Winter Winds, Jazz 1, Jazz 2, and Campus Band. Marching Band runs from late May all the way until around the start of November. From there, it splits off into Wind Ensemble and Symphonic Band for the concert season that runs through the rest of the year. Campus Band is a concert band that goes throughout the entire school year, consisting entirely on students that don't do Marching Band. Winter Winds is a group of students that participate in an indoor marching season that takes place from around the middle of November to April. Jazz 1 and Jazz 2 run throughout the school year, and can consist of students from Wind Ensemble, Symphonic Band, and Campus Band.

Bellevue East's Marching Band and Winter Winds shows have been written most recently by Michael J. Miller, famously known as the brass writer for the DCI group, Colts.

== Notable alumni ==
- Jerry DePoyster, Class of 1964: football player
- Jim Webb, Class of 1965: United States Senator from Virginia, screenwriter, and author
- Robert Hays, Class of 1965: actor
- Bonnie McElveen-Hunter, Class of 1968: businesswoman and former U.S. Ambassador to Finland
- Rik Bonness, Class of 1972: professional football player
- Barclay Knapp, Class of 1975: Senior Fellow at Johns Hopkins University, CEO & Co-Founder of M2M Spectrum Networks.
- Buddy Carlyle, Class of 1996: Major League Baseball player
- Tyler Cloyd, Class of 2005: Major League Baseball player
- Yvonne Turner, Class of 2006: WNBA Basketball player
- Mikey Gow, Class of 2026 (transferred): Ambidextrous high school quarterback
