= Josh Cooper (wide receiver) =

American football player (born 1989)

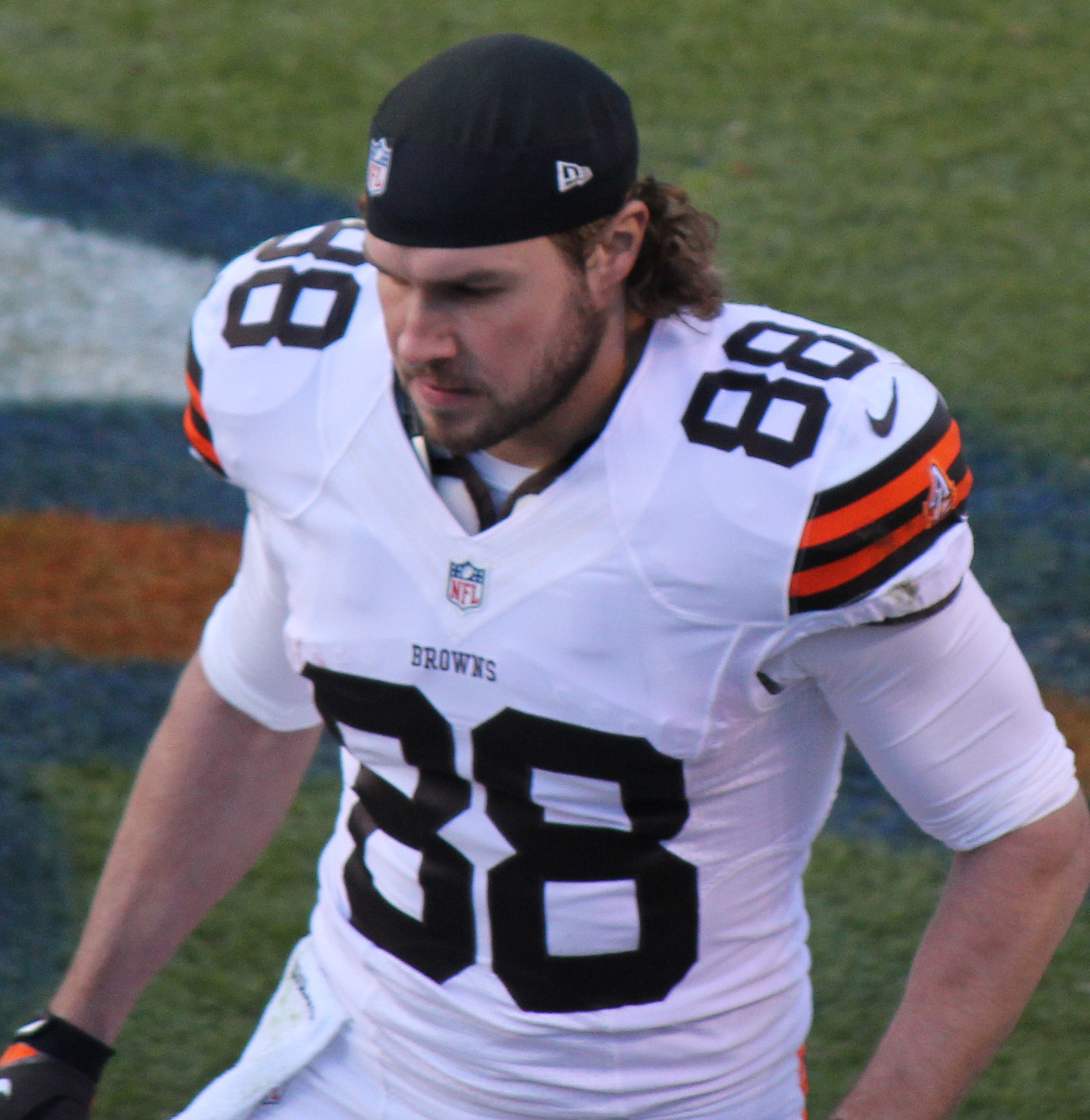
- Cooper in 2012

No. 88
- Position: Wide receiver

Personal information
- Born: January 8, 1989 (age 37); Mustang, Oklahoma, U.S.
- Listed height: 5 ft 10 in (1.78 m)
- Listed weight: 190 lb (86 kg)

Career information
- High school: Mustang
- College: Oklahoma State
- NFL draft: 2012: undrafted

Career history
- Cleveland Browns (2012–2013); Minnesota Vikings (2014)*
- * Offseason or practice squad member only

Awards and highlights
- Second-team All-Big 12 (2011)

Career NFL statistics
- Receptions: 17
- Receiving yards: 166
- Receiving average: 9.8
- Receiving TDs: 0
- Stats at Pro Football Reference

Josh Cooper (born January 8, 1989) is an American former professional football player who was a wide receiver in the National Football League (NFL). He played college football for the Oklahoma State Cowboys.

== Early life ==
Cooper attended and played football at Mustang High School in Mustang, Oklahoma. During his senior season in high school, Cooper caught 81 passes for 1,328 yards and had 15 touchdowns while the team went 10–2. On defense, Cooper accounted for 84 tackles and 6 interceptions. He also kicked eight successful field goals.

== College career ==
Josh Cooper played college football at Oklahoma State University. He was a redshirt in 2007. In 2008 as a freshman, Cooper had 2 catches for 10 ten yards, and 0 touchdowns. In 2009 as a sophomore, Cooper had 20 receptions for 234 yards, and 1 touchdown. In 2010 as a junior, Cooper had 68 catches, 736 receiving yards, and five touchdowns ranking second behind eventual first round draft choice Justin Blackmon. Cooper also returned punts in college, averaging 9.6 yards per return for his career. He returned 1 for a touchdown.

== Professional career ==
=== Pre-Draft Combines ===
225 lb. bench press repetitions: 11
40 yard dash: 3.97
20 yard dash: 1.45
10 yard dash: .67
Vertical jump: 45"
Broad jump: 16'7"
20 yard shuttle: 4
3-cone drill: 5.12

=== Cleveland Browns ===
Cooper signed with the Cleveland Browns as an undrafted free agent after the 2012 NFL draft. He thought he'd have a good chance to stay with Cleveland because he was a favorite target of QB Brandon Weeden, having built a chemistry from when they played together as part of Oklahoma State Cowboys football. His best game came against the bengals at home, catching two passes for 132 yards and a career long 17 yard reception. He was released on May 19, 2014. Due to his injury.

=== Minnesota Vikings ===
The Minnesota Vikings signed Cooper on June 13, 2014. He was waived on July 25, 2014.
