= Nadia (film) =

- Directed by: Alan Cooke
- Written by: Jim McGinn
- Produced by: James Thompson; Wayne Threm
- Starring: Leslie Weiner; Johann Carlo; Joe Bennett
- Cinematography: Frank Beascoechea
- Edited by: Raymond Bridgers
- Music by: Christopher L. Stone
- Release date: June 11, 1984
- Running time: 100 minutes
- Countries: United States; Yugoslavia
- Language: English

Nadia is a 1984 made-for-television biopic directed by Alan Cooke about Olympic gymnast Nadia Comăneci. Comăneci herself had nothing to do with the production of the film (the content of which was described to her by others). She stated at the time of its release that those involved with the film never made contact with her: "I sincerely don't even want to see it, I feel so badly about it. It distorts my life so totally."

== Plot ==
As a young child, Romanian Nadia Comăneci was discovered by domineering gymnastics coach Béla Károlyi. Károlyi and his wife Márta trained Comăneci in their gymnastics school for eight years. Comăneci eventually became a world champion gymnast. In 1976, at the age of 14, she became the first woman to ever score a perfect 10 at the Olympics; she ended the competition with seven 10s, three gold medals, one silver, and one bronze and became an instant celebrity in Romania and around the world. However, the pressure was too much for Comăneci to handle. She was separated from the Károlyis by the Romanian government and became overweight and out-of-shape. She eventually rebounded, though, and led her country to the 1979 World Championship gold.

== Cast ==
- Leslie Weiner as Young Nadia Comăneci
- Johann Carlo as Older Nadia Comăneci
- Joe Bennett as Béla Károlyi
- Talia Balsam as Márta Károlyi
- Conchata Ferrell as Mili Simonescu
- Carl Strano as Nicholae Vieru
- Jonathan Banks as Gheorge Comăneci
- Carrie Snodgress as Stefania Comăneci
- Karrie Ullman as Young Teodora Ungureanu
- Simone Blue as Older Teodora Ungureanu
- Marcia Frederick as Nadia Comăneci (stunts)
- Karin Aderente as Ludmilla Tourischeva and as Older Teodora Ungureanu (stunts)
