= Mustang, Oklahoma =

City in Oklahoma, US

- City
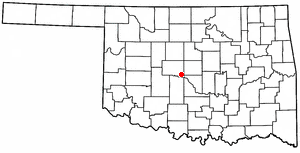
- Location of Mustang, Oklahoma

- Location in the United States
- Coordinates: 35°23′30″N 97°43′29″W
- Country: United States
- State: Oklahoma
- County: Canadian

Government
  - Type: Council-manager

Area
  - Total: 12.01 sq mi (31.10 km^{2})
  - Land: 11.98 sq mi (31.04 km^{2})
  - Water: 0.027 sq mi (0.07 km^{2})
- Elevation: 1,335 ft (407 m)

Population (2020)
  - Total: 19,879
  - Density: 1,658.8/sq mi (640.47/km^{2})
- Time zone: UTC-6 (Central (CST))
  - Summer (DST): UTC-5 (CDT)
- ZIP code: 73064
- Area code: 405
- FIPS code: 40-50100
- GNIS feature ID: 2411202
- Website: www.cityofmustang.org

Mustang is a city in the southeastern corner of Canadian County, Oklahoma, United States. It is part of the Oklahoma City metropolitan area. Mustang's population was 19,879 at the 2020 census, a 14.3% increase from 17,398 in 2010. The city is now primarily known as a bedroom community for Oklahoma City.

== History ==
The Mustang post office was established in 1895, but the town was not formally established until Charles G. Jones, former mayor of Oklahoma City, filed the plat in November, 1901. During that same year, the Oklahoma City and Western Railroad (acquired later by the St. Louis and San Francisco Railway (Frisco)) built a line from Oklahoma City to Chickasha that passed through Mustang.

== Geography ==
According to the United States Census Bureau, the city has a total area of 12.0 square miles (31 km^{2}), of which 12.0 sq mi (31 km^{2}) are land and 0.04 sq mi (0.10 km^{2}) is water.

== Demographics ==
Historical population
Census	Pop.	Note	%±
1930	107		—
1940	214		100.0%
1950	210		−1.9%
1960	198		−5.7%
1970	2,637		1,231.8%
1980	7,496		184.3%
1990	10,434		39.2%
2000	13,156		26.1%
2010	17,398		32.2%
2020	19,879		14.3%
2022 (est.)	22,232		11.8%

=== 2020 census ===
As of the 2020 census, Mustang had a population of 19,879. The median age was 38.0 years. 25.9% of residents were under the age of 18 and 15.8% of residents were 65 years of age or older. For every 100 females there were 95.5 males, and for every 100 females age 18 and over there were 92.0 males age 18 and over.

99.6% of residents lived in urban areas, while 0.4% lived in rural areas.

There were 7,440 households in Mustang, of which 37.7% had children under the age of 18 living in them. Of all households, 56.5% were married-couple households, 14.7% were households with a male householder and no spouse or partner present, and 23.5% were households with a female householder and no spouse or partner present. About 21.3% of all households were made up of individuals and 10.0% had someone living alone who was 65 years of age or older.

There were 7,777 housing units, of which 4.3% were vacant. Among occupied housing units, 74.2% were owner-occupied and 25.8% were renter-occupied. The homeowner vacancy rate was 1.7% and the rental vacancy rate was 6.8%.

Racial composition as of the 2020 census
Race	Percent
White	77.0%
Black or African American	1.7%
American Indian and Alaska Native	4.0%
Asian	1.3%
Native Hawaiian and Other Pacific Islander	0.1%
Some other race	3.0%
Two or more races	12.9%
Hispanic or Latino (of any race)	9.5%

=== 2000 census ===
As of the 2000 census, 13,156 people, 4,721 households, and 3,800 families were residing in the city. The population density was 1,095.9 people per mi^{2} (422.9/km^{2}). The 4,930 housing units averaged 410.7 per square mile (158.5/km^{2}). The racial makeup of the city was 91.63% White, 0.59% African American, 3.33% Native American, 0.50% Asian, 0.09% Pacific Islander, 0.78% from other races, and 3.08% from two or more races. About 3.01% of the population was Hispanic or Latino of any race.

Of the 4,721 households, 42.6% had children under the age of 18 living with them, 66.6% were married couples living together, 10.1% had a female householder with no husband present, and 19.5% were not families. About 16.3% of all households were made up of individuals, and 6.5% had someone living alone who was 65 years of age or older. The average household size was 2.76, and the average family size was 3.09.

In the city, the age distribution was 29.6% under 18, 7.9% from 18 to 24, 31.5% from 25 to 44, 22.5% from 45 to 64, and 8.6% who were 65 or older. The median age was 34 years. For every 100 females, there were 94.8 males. For every 100 females age 18 and over, there were 90.6 males.

The median income for a household in the city was $50,284, and for a family was $53,018. Males had a median income of $36,406 versus $24,856 for females. The per capita income for the city was $20,860. 5.6% of the population and 4.0% of families were below the poverty line. 7.6% of those under the age of 18 and 8.7% of those 65 and older were living below the poverty line.

== Economy ==
Mustang's economy was based on agriculture until the middle of the 20th century. Major crops included wheat, oats, corn, cotton, sweet potatoes, watermelons, and cantaloupes. Until the 1920s, peach and other fruit orchards were the primary crops for local farmers. Truck farming remained prevalent into the 1940s, when the dairy and beef industries gained supremacy. In the 1960s, the town began evolving into a bedroom community for Oklahoma City.

== Education ==
Mustang Public Schools is the school district, covering the City of Mustang and the areas in Oklahoma City immediately surrounding the city. Mustang High School is the district's only high school and county's largest.

== Government ==
Mustang has a council-manager form of government. The mayor is Michael Ray, elected November, 2025.

== Sports ==
Mustang is the home base of the Canadian Valley Rangerettes Mounted Drill Team. The Rangerettes are the three-time United States Equestrian Drill Association National Open Drill Champions. The team captured the sport's highest prize, the SportsQuest Cup, in 2008, 2009, and 2011. The team also won the Kessler prize in 2012.

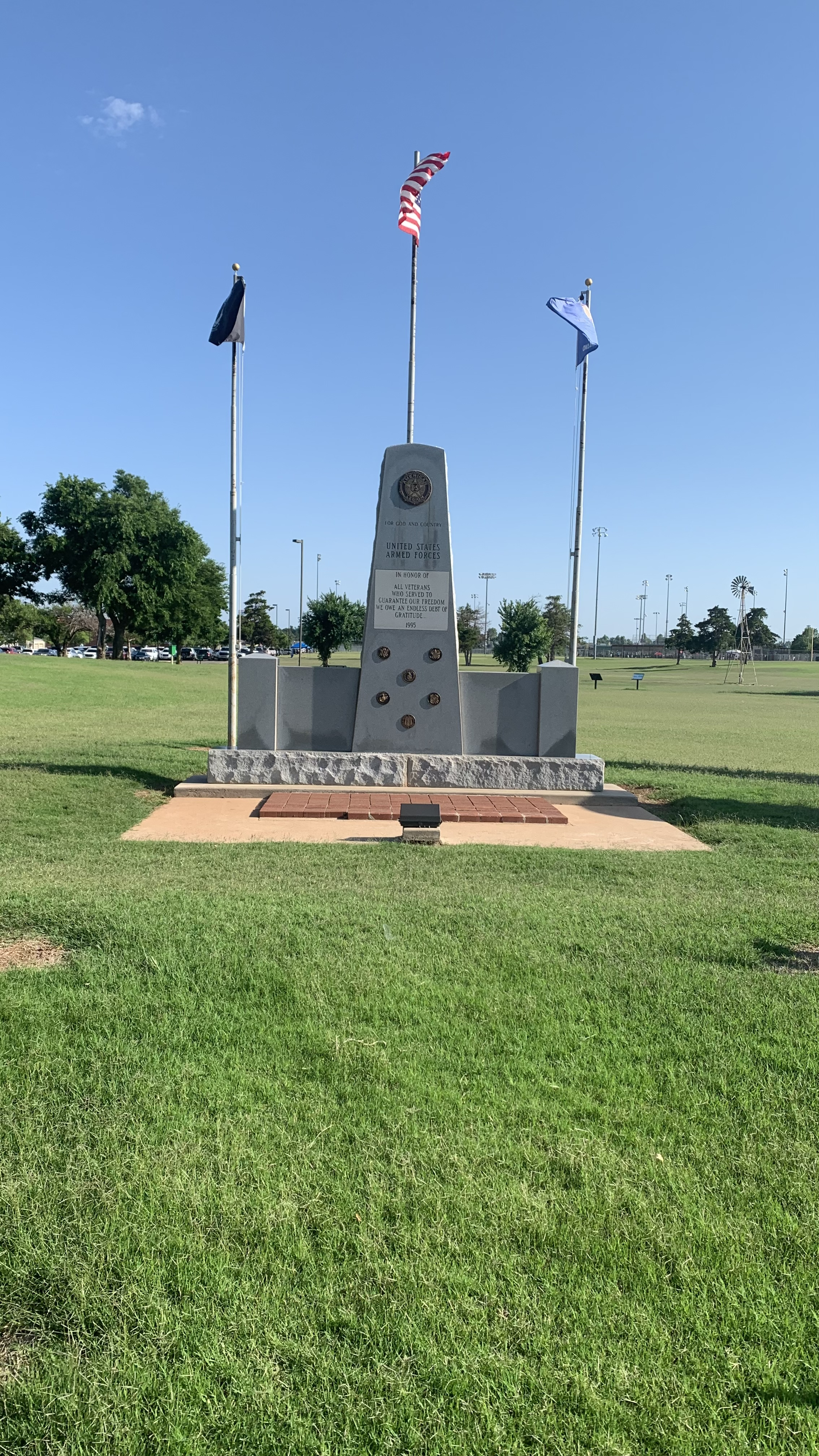
A stone engraved with message commemorating those who served in the United States Armed Forces in Wild Horse Park.

== Notable places ==
Wild Horse Park is a park that contains the city hall, two playgrounds, a memorial for those who served in the U.S. armed forces, a baseball stadium, a pond, a water park, town center (which includes a library, a senior citizens center and more), a dog park, a soccer field and more. The park is often used for town events and is used to set off fireworks at every 4th of July.

== Notable people ==
- Dan Bailey, Minnesota Vikings kicker
- Dennis Byrd, New York Jets defensive lineman
- Josh Cooper, Cleveland Browns wide receiver
- Kendall Cross, Olympic gold medalist in freestyle wrestling
- Shane Hamman, IPF and USPF Powerlifting Medalist, Olympic weightlifter
- Bartees Strange, musician
