= Larry Kimbrough =

American baseball player (1923–2001)

- Pitcher / Outfielder / Infielder
- Born: September 23, 1923; Philadelphia, Pennsylvania, U.S.
- Died: January 29, 2001 (aged 77); Philadelphia, Pennsylvania, U.S.
- Batted: Switch Threw: Switch

Negro league baseball debut
- 1942, for the Philadelphia Stars

Last appearance
- 1948, for the Homestead Grays

Negro leagues statistics
- Win–loss record: 1–5
- Earned run average: 6.75
- Strikeouts: 14
- Stats at Baseball Reference

Teams
- Philadelphia Stars (1942–1944, 1946); Homestead Grays (1948)

Larry Nathaniel Kimbrough (September 23, 1923 – January 29, 2001), nicknamed "Schoolboy", was an American pitcher in Negro league baseball during the 1940s. A rare switch pitcher, he played for the Philadelphia Stars and the Homestead Grays. He also made appearances as an outfielder and infielder.

== Biography ==
A native of Philadelphia, Pennsylvania, Kimbrough graduated from Benjamin Franklin High School, where he starred on the school's baseball team, tossing a no-hitter in 1941. A natural left-hander, he learned to throw right-handed as a child while recuperating from an injury. He stated "I could throw them as hard left-handed as I could right-handed, with a better curveball left-handed."

Kimbrough played in the second Negro National League from 1942 to 1944, missed 1945 while serving in the United States Army, and again played in 1946 and 1948. Overall, he pitched in 13 games (four starts), compiling a 1–5 win–loss record with a 6.75 earned run average (ERA) while striking out 14 batters in 44 innings pitched. As a position player, he played as an outfielder, third baseman, and shortstop. He had a .265 batting average (9-for-34) with four runs batted in (RBIs).

Independent accounts verifying that Kimbrough operated as a switch pitcher during his baseball career are lacking, but Kimbrough himself claimed that he earned a complete game victory in 1943 pitching from both sides. Other accounts verify his pitching win but not that he used both arms as a pitcher in that specific game.

Kimbrough later worked for the United States Post Office for 33 years. He was an inductee of the Pennsylvania Sports Hall of Fame. Kimbrough died in Philadelphia in 2001, aged 77; he was survived by his wife and four daughters.
