= Mustang High School =

Coordinates: 35.385177°N 97.725818°W

Location
- 801 S Snyder Dr; Mustang, Oklahoma 73064; United States

Information
- Type: Co-Educational; Public; Secondary; Special-Ed
- Established: 1902
- School district: Mustang Public Schools
- NCES District ID: 4021000
- Authority: OSDE
- CEEB code: 372500
- NCES School ID: 402100001046
- Principal: Dr. Kathy Knowles
- Teaching staff: 181.80 (on an FTE basis)
- Enrollment: 3,858 (2023-2024)
- Student to teacher ratio: 21.02
- Campus: Suburban
- Colors: Red, black, and white
- Athletics: Basketball, baseball, cross country, football, soccer, softball, swimming, tennis, volleyball, track
- Athletics conference: OSSAA Class 6A
- Mascot: Morsey
- Nickname: Broncos
- Team name: Mustang Broncos
- Rivals: Yukon High School "Millers"
- USNWR ranking: 11,885
- Website: mhs.mustangps.org

Mustang High School, often shortened to MHS, is a public school located in Mustang, Oklahoma, United States. It is the only secondary school in the Mustang Public Schools public school district and serves around 6,800 students.

The complex contains a large band room, an auditorium, a performing arts center, and three gymnasiums.

The district (of which, this is the sole comprehensive high school) covers Mustang and parts of Oklahoma City. The district extends into portions of OKC in Cleveland County and Oklahoma County.

== Sports ==
Mustang offers baseball, softball, boys' basketball, girls' basketball, cheer, boys' cross country, girls' cross country, football, boys' golf, girls' golf, pom, boys' soccer, girls' soccer, swimming, boys' tennis, girls' tennis, boys' track, girls' track, volleyball, and wrestling.

Runner Gabe Simonsen broke the state record for Oklahoma in the two-mile run with a time of 8:56.07 in 2021.

The school has a nationally competitive marching-band program formerly known as the Nightriders. Due to controversy in 2020, the band was renamed, now the Mustang Marching Band. They placed 17th nationally in 2021 with their show titled "Shark World."

Mustang is a 6A school.

== Notable alumni ==
- Dennis Byrd - former NFL defensive lineman
- Kendall Cross - Olympic freestyle wrestler, gold medalist at 1996 Summer Olympics
- Josh Cooper - former NFL wide receiver
- Dax Fulton - professional baseball player
- Shane Hamman - Olympic weightlifter
- Josh Heskew former Nebraska Cornhuskers football, National Champion also played for Oklahoma Wranglers.
- Ty Fanning - Known for Chicago Med (2015), Hollis (2015) and Search Party (2016).
- Lane Factor - Known for Reservation Dogs (2021), The Fabelmans (2022).

== See also ==
- Mikey Gow
- Jacobe Johnson - Oklahoma University Defensive Back
- Tristan Epp - R&B/indie artist
