= Mike Slaton =

American football player (born 1964)

No. 35
- Positions: Cornerback, safety

Personal information
- Born: September 25, 1964 (age 62); Sacramento, California, U.S.
- Listed height: 6 ft 2 in (1.88 m)
- Listed weight: 194 lb (88 kg)

Career information
- High school: Bellevue (NE) West
- College: South Dakota
- NFL draft: 1986: 9th round, 232nd overall pick

Career history
- Minnesota Vikings (1986)*; New York Jets (1987)*; Minnesota Vikings (1987)
- * Offseason or practice squad member only
- Stats at Pro Football Reference

Michael Lee Slaton (born September 25, 1964) is an American former professional football cornerback and safety in the National Football League (NFL). He was selected by the Minnesota Vikings in the ninth round of the 1986 NFL draft.

After graduating Bellevue West High School, Slaton played college football for the University of South Dakota. In 2004, he was inducted in the Coyote Sports Hall of Fame. He was selected by the Minnesota Vikings in the ninth round, with the 232nd overall pick, in the 1986 NFL draft.
