= List of Highway to Heaven episodes =

Highway to Heaven is an American television drama series which ran on NBC from 1984 to 1989.

== Series overview ==
Season	Episodes	Originally released	
Season	Episodes	First released	Last released
1	25	September 19, 1984	May 8, 1985
2	24	September 18, 1985	May 7, 1986
3	25	September 24, 1986	May 6, 1987
4	24	September 16, 1987	April 27, 1988
5	13	October 12, 1988	August 4, 1989

== Episodes ==
=== Season 1 (1984–85) ===
The Pilot was filmed from March to April 1984; Season 1 was filmed from August 1984 to March 1985.

No. overall	No. in season	Title	Directed by	Written by	Original release date	Prod. code	Rating/share (households)
1	1	"Highway to Heaven (Pilot)"	Michael Landon	Michael Landon	September 19, 1984	7849-A	20.6/35
2	2	"Highway to Heaven (Pilot)"	Michael Landon	Michael Landon	September 19, 1984	7849-B	20.6/35
Angel Jonathan Smith is assigned to help the residents of a retirement home that may be sold, but Mark Gordon, an embittered ex-cop and brother of the home's female supervisor, is suspicious of him, especially when she starts seeing Jonathan socially. Guest Stars: Helen Hayes, Eddie Quillan: Originally shown as a feature-length Pilot TV Movie, which was later cut into two separate episodes for syndication.
3	3	"To Touch the Moon"	Michael Landon	Michael Landon	September 26, 1984	7803	17.4/28
Jonathan comes into the lives of the widow of an astronaut who landed on the Moon and her terminally ill son, while Mark deals with a juvenile delinquent abandoned by his family. The young hood is surprisingly well-received by the widow, and helps her deal with the forthcoming tragedy. Guest Star: Barret Oliver
4	4	"The Return of the Masked Rider"	Michael Landon	Dan Gordon	October 3, 1984	7805	18.1/29
Jonathan and Mark's latest assignment is in a ghetto populated by gang members and aging men who once starred in a Western TV show, as well as a gym where a retired boxer trains his grandson for an upcoming fight against the gang leader, with a prominent championship at stake. When the gang tries to ensure that their man will win by kidnapping the old boxer, Jonathan motivates the retired actors to be the Old West heroes who inspired kids to do right, and they in turn rally the neighborhood residents to stand up to the gang and rescue the grandfather. Guest Star: John Agar
5	5	"Song of the Wild West"	Victor French	Story by : Maryanne Kasica and Michael Scheff; Teleplay by : Dan Gordon, Maryanne Kasica and Michael Scheff	October 17, 1984	7807	16.1/26
Jonathan helps an aspiring singer follow in her late mother's footsteps despite her father's objections. Guest Stars: Ronee Blakley, Michele Greene, Jerry Hardin, Clifton James, Harry Johnson, and J.S. 'Joe' Young
6	6	"One Fresh Batch of Lemonade: Part 1"	Michael Landon	Dan Gordon	October 24, 1984	7806	17.2/27
A baseball player hoping to get into the pros is injured in a motorcycle accident. Guest Stars: Ken Olandt, James Troesh
7	7	"One Fresh Batch of Lemonade: Part 2"	Michael Landon	Dan Gordon	October 31, 1984	7809	16.3/26
Jonathan enlists a gymnast to help rehabilitate Deke Larson following his accident. Guest Stars: Virginia Capers, Bart Conner
8	8	"A Divine Madness"	Michael Landon	Dan Gordon	November 7, 1984	7810	16.1/25
A construction magnate believes he's King Arthur and his son wants him declared incompetent. Guest Stars: Jonathan Frakes, Ron Moody, Helen Kleeb
9	9	"Catch a Falling Star"	Michael Landon	Michael Landon	November 14, 1984	7808	17.7/27
Jonathan and Mark help a busy movie star learn to spend time with his children, who he had been neglecting. Guest Star: Daniel Davis
10	10	"Help Wanted: Angel"	Michael Landon	Dan Gordon	November 21, 1984	7811	14.9/25
An old screenwriter's prayers are answered when Jonathan and Mark agree to support his movie about the lonely people in his neighborhood, including a woman Mark falls in love with but who is hiding a terrible secret. Guest Star: Stella Stevens
11	11	"Dust Child"	Victor French	Paul W. Cooper	November 28, 1984	7804	18.1/28
A Vietnam War veteran and his wife welcome the 15-year-old girl he fathered overseas into their house. However, the couple's teenage son is not so welcoming to his Vietnamese half-sister; even less so are their neighbors, and the boy's schoolmates. Guest Stars: Jenny Sullivan, James Whitmore, Jr.
12	12	"Hotel of Dreams"	Michael Landon	Story by : Paul Wolff; Teleplay by : Paul W. Cooper	December 12, 1984	7812	17.0/26
Jonathan and Mark get jobs at a hotel where they give the guests what they deserve. Guest Star: Brian Kerwin
13	13	"Another Song for Christmas"	Michael Landon	Dan Gordon	December 19, 1984	7813	15.3/25
If this one sounds like a variation on A Christmas Carol by Charles Dickens, it should. Mark and Jonathan are tasked with getting "Honest Eddy" Barton, a crooked-as-they-come used-car dealer, into the Holiday spirit. Guest Stars: Geoffrey Lewis, Matt Shakman, Kellie Martin
14	14	"Plane Death"	Victor French	Michael Landon	January 9, 1985	7814	16.4/23
An old friend of Mark's disappears after discovering the illegal cargo inside a model airplane. Guest Stars: David Faustino, Ramon Bieri
15	15	"One-Winged Angels"	Michael Landon	Story by : Jan Heininger and Hugh Corcoran; Teleplay by : Jan Heininger	January 16, 1985	7815	19.5/28
Jonathan falls in love with the divorcee he's been assigned to help. Guest Star: Wil Wheaton
16	16	"Going Home, Going Home"	Michael Landon	Dan Gordon	January 23, 1985	7816	19.5/29
Mark loses consciousness in an auto accident and finds himself and Jonathan back in time to when his grandfather was about to lose his ranch. Guest Stars: John McLiam, Sean De Veritch
17	17	"As Difficult as ABC"	Victor French	Parke Perine	January 30, 1985	7817	20.5/29
An illiterate basketball player loses his scholarship due to a heart condition. Guest Star: Deborah Lacey, Beah Richards
18	18	"A Child of God"	Michael Landon	Michael Landon	February 6, 1985	7818	20.0/29
A young woman is shunned by her minister father for having a child out of wedlock, then becomes terminally ill. Guest Stars: Nora Boland, William Windom
19	19	"A Match Made in Heaven"	Michael Landon	Story by : James Troesh and Theresa Troesh; Teleplay by : Michael Landon	February 20, 1985	7819	17.9/27
A quadriplegic friend of Jonathan's wonders if his relationship with a woman is meant to be. Guest Stars: James Troesh, Margie Impert
20	20	"The Banker and the Bum"	Michael Landon	Dan Gordon	February 27, 1985	7820	18.1/28
A mayoral candidate intent on turning a local park into a parking lot is made to trade places with a park bum who, in turn, may help save the candidate's marriage. Guest Star: Ned Beatty (dual role)
21	21	"The Brightest Star"	Victor French	Christopher Beaumont	March 6, 1985	7821	19.3/29
Jonathan and Mark return a runaway child star to her dysfunctional parents. Guest Stars: Trish Van Devere, Gerald S. O'Loughlin, Carrie Wells
22	22	"An Investment in Caring"	Michael Landon	Parke Perine	March 13, 1985	7822	18.2/28
Jonathan helps a neighborhood being threatened by a corporate takeover. Guest Stars: Eileen Heckart, Dane Clark, Andrew Duggan
23	23	"The Right Thing"	Victor French	Michael Landon	March 27, 1985	7823	18.4/29
An old man, depressed over his wife's death, is forced into a rest home by his daughter-in-law. He loses his appetite and talks of dying, until his grandson goes walking, then running, with him, and they win a 5K race. Guest Stars: Michael Durrell, Lew Ayres, Matthew Laborteaux
24	24	"Thoroughbreds: Part 1"	Michael Landon	Dan Gordon	May 1, 1985	7824	17.0/28
An attraction develops between a trainer's daughter and the son of a horse-breeding farmer. Guest Stars: Helen Hunt, John Hammond, Noble Willingham, Stephen Elliott, Richard Bull
25	25	"Thoroughbreds: Part 2"	Michael Landon	Dan Gordon	May 8, 1985	7825	17.1/30
Lizzy MacGill and Garth Armstrong elope, but their relationship is jeopardized by Lizzy needing treatment for her cancer. Guest Star: Elizabeth Storm

=== Season 2 (1985–86) ===
Season 2 was filmed from July 1985 to March 1986.

No. overall	No. in season	Title	Directed by	Written by	Original release date	Prod. code	Rating/share (households)
26	1	"A Song for Jason: Part 1"	Michael Landon	Dan Gordon	September 18, 1985	7851	18.9/32
Jonathan and Mark get jobs at Camp Good Times, a camp for young cancer patients, particularly one boy who suffers from overprotection by his well-meaning but selfish mother...whose impossible demands create hardship not only for him, but also for the rest of their otherwise-cancer-free family. Guest Stars: Brian Lane Green, Robin Riker, Giovanni Ribisi
27	2	"A Song for Jason: Part 2"	Michael Landon	Dan Gordon	September 25, 1985	7852	20.9/33
Jonathan and Mark's work at Camp Good Times involves helping a boy whose rock-star father avoids him and a teenager smitten with a counselor. Guest Stars: Joshua John Miller, Barry Williams
28	3	"Bless the Boys in Blue"	Victor French	Dan Gordon	October 2, 1985	7853	22.4/35
When Mark complains that Jonathan has too much advantage as an angel, "The Boss" apparently agrees that Jonathan should be in Mark's shoes and then gives Jonathan and Mark an assignment as policemen with no divine abilities. Guest Star: Elvia Allman
29	4	"Cindy"	Michael Landon	Dan Gordon	October 23, 1985	7854	18.9/29
In a modern retelling of Cinderella, a waitress aspires to be an actress. Guest Stars: Bill Macy, Alice Ghostley, Kip Gilman
30	5	"The Devil and Jonathan Smith"	Michael Landon	Dan Gordon	October 30, 1985	7857	19.4/30
When Mark sells his soul to the Devil to save the life of a boy he accidentally ran over, Jonathan must get help from two con men to get him out of it. Guest Stars: Anthony Zerbe, Conrad Janis, Michael Berryman, Phil Rubenstein, Joseph V. Perry, Buck Young, and R. D. Robb
31	6	"Birds of a Feather"	Michael Landon	Maxine Herman	November 6, 1985	7859	20.2/31
Factory workers face the consequences for ignoring evidence of water contamination in order to keep their jobs. Guest Stars: Philip Abbott, Rick Hurst, Paul Walker
32	7	"Popcorn, Peanuts and Crackerjacks"	Michael Landon	Vince R. Gutierrez	November 13, 1985	7856	19.5/29
Jonathan and Mark come to the aid of a minor-league baseball team that's never won a game and an old vendor, once a player for the black leagues, who gets kicked out of the stadium. Guest Stars: Moses Gunn, Keenan Wynn, Lynn Hamilton
33	8	"The Smile in the Third Row"	Michael Landon	Lan O'Kun	November 20, 1985	7860	20.7/31
An actor starring in a failing Broadway play thinks he sees God sitting in the audience. Guest Star: Lorne Greene, David Lander
34	9	"The Secret"	William F. Claxton	Paul W. Cooper	November 27, 1985	7855	20.5/33
When Jonathan must return to Heaven to face disciplinary action, Mark is left on his own to help when the daughter of his friends learns that she's adopted and sets out to find her real mother. Guest Star: Shannen Doherty
35	10	"The Monster: Part 1"	Victor French	Dan Gordon	December 4, 1985	7861	21.3/31
A disfigured artist falls for a blind girl and Jonathan's quadriplegic lawyer friend denies having marital problems. Guest Star: Eve Brent Ashe
36	11	"The Monster: Part 2"	Victor French	Dan Gordon	December 11, 1985	7862	23.1/35
Scotty defends Julian on charges of attacking Rachel, who's in a coma. Guest Star: Peter Billingsley
37	12	"The Good Doctor"	William F. Claxton	Rift Fournier	December 18, 1985	7858	21.1/33
The doctor for a football team who got a player addicted to painkillers and pep pills is forced to confront his own addictions. Guest Star: Michael Constantine
38	13	"Alone"	Michael Landon	Michael Landon	January 8, 1986	7863	23.1/35
A mentally challenged runaway with a cat as his only friend wishes that someone would love him. Guest Stars: Frank Birney, John Franklin
39	14	"Close Encounters of the Heavenly Kind"	Victor French	Paul W. Cooper	January 15, 1986	7864	19.9/29
Jonathan and Mark emerge from a meteorite crater to help an unemployed man keep custody of his orphaned grandson. Guest Stars: Harold J. Stone, Louise Latham
40	15	"Change of Life"	Michael Landon	Dan Gordon	January 29, 1986	7866	23.8/34
A movie star and her hairdresser (Mark) have their wish to trade places granted by God. Guest Stars: John McCook, Anne-Marie Martin
41	16	"Keep Smiling"	Michael Landon	Michael Landon	February 5, 1986	7865	22.8/35
Jonathan is assigned to help his widow move on with her life and be happy again. Guest Stars: Dorothy McGuire, Richard McGonagle
42	17	"The Last Assignment"	Michael Landon	Michael Landon	February 12, 1986	7867	22.0/32
An errant angel has been on probation for 200 years because he keeps spreading happiness by breaking the rules. Guest Star: Ed Asner
43	18	"To Bind the Wounds"	Michael Landon	Dan Gordon	February 19, 1986	7868	22.2/33
The father of a soldier killed in action in Vietnam is met with indifference when he tries to establish a scholarship in his son's name. Guest Star: Eli Wallach
44	19	"Heaven on Earth"	Michael Landon	David O. Young	February 26, 1986	7869	19.7/29
Following two tragedies for which Mark feels responsible, Jonathan gives him the power to start over. Guest Star: Alyson Croft
45	20	"Summit"	Dan Gordon	Dan Gordon	March 5, 1986	7870	21.0/32
A dying woman wishes to see her son, who was left in the Soviet Union during World War II and is now the Deputy Premier. Guest Stars: Nehemiah Persoff, Frank Welker
46	21	"The Torch"	Michael Landon	Lan O'Kun	March 12, 1986	7871	21.1/32
A Holocaust survivor and his son are targeted by neo-Nazis. Guest Stars: Herschel Bernardi, Paul Koslo, Mark-Paul Gosselaar, Robert O'Reilly
47	22	"Sail Away"	Michael Landon	Lan O'Kun	April 2, 1986	7872	18.3/29
A novelist and his grandson find inspiration on a small island. Guest Stars: David Bowe, Lew Ayres, Laurie Prange
48	23	"Children's Children"	Victor French	David Thoreau	April 30, 1986	7873	19.1/32
A reporter interviews the director of a home for unwed mothers, but intends to write a story exposing the director's long-hidden secret. Guest Star: Bibi Besch
49	24	"Friends"	Michael Landon	Michael Landon	May 7, 1986	7874	17.2/30
Jonathan and Mark are substitute teachers at a high school where Jonathan assigns a lonely obese girl to tutor a jock. Guest Star: Darren Dalton

=== Season 3 (1986–87) ===
It's presently unclear when Season 3 began filming, but it can be confirmed that filming wrapped in March 1987.

No. overall	No. in season	Title	Directed by	Written by	Original release date	Prod. code	Rating/share (households)
50	1	"A Special Love: Part 1"	Michael Landon	Dan Gordon	September 24, 1986	7901	16.7/27
Jonathan and Mark talk a youngster into joining the Special Olympics and help out a couple who are unable to have children. Guest Stars: Paul Walker, James Troesh, Margie Impert
51	2	"A Special Love: Part 2"	Michael Landon	Dan Gordon	October 1, 1986	7902	17.3/29
Todd's parents won't let Scotty and Diane adopt him until Todd's elder brother discovers the truth about him. Guest Star: Josh Brolin
52	3	"For the Love of Larry"	Michael Landon	Michael Landon	October 8, 1986	7903	21.1/33
A dog tries to draw attention to a father and son trapped in a Jeep that's gone off the road and crashed. Guest Star: Ryan Bollman
53	4	"Another Kind of War, Another Kind of Peace"	Dan Gordon	Story by : Dan Gordon and Sally Baker; Teleplay by : Dan Gordon	October 15, 1986	7904	18.9/29
Despite sponsoring their immigration, a cab driver wants nothing to do with the wife and child his deceased son left in Vietnam. A lonely older neighbor takes them to a carnival and offers to share his apartment. Guest Stars: Eugene Roche, Ernest Borgnine
54	5	"That's Our Dad"	Victor French	Geoffrey Fischer	October 29, 1986	7905	16.8/27
A pair of orphans wish to be adopted by a family sitcom star who is really a cold-hearted cynic. Guest Stars: R. J. Williams, Ned Beatty
55	6	"Love at Second Sight"	Michael Landon	James Kearns	November 5, 1986	7908	19.1/29
A fellow angel doesn't want his widow to remarry. Guest Stars: John McLiam, Peggy Doyle, Nana Visitor
56	7	"Love and Marriage"	Michael Landon	Dan Gordon	November 12, 1986	7907	18.7/28
57	8	"Love and Marriage"	Michael Landon	Dan Gordon	November 12, 1986	7907	18.7/28
Three generations of arguing couples go on a road trip to find out what brought them together. Guest Stars: Bill Erwin, Valorie Armstrong, Robert Mandan: Originally shown as a feature-length episode, which was later cut into two separate episodes for syndication.
58	9	"Code Name: FREAK"	Michael Landon	Vince R. Gutierrez	November 19, 1986	7906	14.5/22
A 12-year-old boy genius is an outcast at college where he has a popular jock for a roommate. Guest Stars: Jeff B. Davis, Jack Ging
59	10	"Man to Man"	Michael Landon	Robert Schaefer	November 26, 1986	7910	16.4/25
A tycoon who is dying of leukemia tries to mend his relationship with his teenage son. Guest Stars: Joe Dorsey, Lee Montgomery
60	11	"Jonathan Smith Goes to Washington"	Michael Landon	Dan Gordon	December 3, 1986	7909	15.7/24
A senator is bent on getting a bill through Congress that would cut funds required for the production of drugs to cure rare diseases, but learns that passage of the bill will have fatal consequences affecting his family. Guest Star: Eddie Albert
61	12	"Oh Lucky Man"	Dan Gordon	David Thoreau	December 10, 1986	7912	16.8/26
Mark plans to give the $5 million he won to a boys' club, but loses it to a pair of con artists. Guest Stars: Shannon Tweed, Roy Thinnes
62	13	"Basinger's New York"	Michael Landon	Lan O'Kun	December 17, 1986	7913	19.1/30
On Christmas Eve, a New York City columnist learns there are still miracles in the world. Guest Star: Richard Mulligan
63	14	"All That Glitters"	Michael Landon	Dan Gordon	January 7, 1987	7911	18.5/27
A hustler finds a case containing a million dollars, dresses as a priest to escape from the gangsters who lost the case and then hides out with the money in the same church where "Father" Jonathan and "Father" Mark are helping victims of an urban fire. Guest Stars: Didi Conn, John Pleshette
64	15	"Wally"	Michael Landon	Michael Landon	January 14, 1987	7914	19.7/30
Jonathan and Mark's latest assignment concerns an elderly street puppeteer who is marked for a favored position in heaven. Guest Star: Dick Van Dyke
65	16	"A Song of Songs"	Michael Landon	Dan Gordon	January 21, 1987	7917	19.5/28
A jazz pianist tries to start over following a heart attack. Guest Stars: James Earl Jones, Rosalind Cash
66	17	"A Night to Remember"	Michael Landon	David Thoreau	January 28, 1987	7916	19.5/29
High school seniors pray for dates to the prom. Victor French’s nose injury was written into the episode. Guest Star: Mitchell Anderson
67	18	"A Mother and a Daughter"	Michael Landon	Elaine Newman and Ed Burnham	February 4, 1987	7915	18.1/28
Jonathan will be promoted to Heaven if he succeeds in reuniting a movie star with her daughter, who's writing a vicious expose of her mother, and Mark, who doesn't want Jonathan to go, is thinking of sabotaging the assignment. Guest Stars: Gloria DeHaven, Judith Chapman
68	19	"Normal People"	Michael Landon	Paul W. Cooper	February 11, 1987	7918	17.0/25
Hostility ensues when a halfway house for mental patients is established in a neighborhood. Guest Star: Brian Austin Green
69	20	"The Hero"	Michael Landon	Michael Landon	February 18, 1987	7919	18.6/28
A Vietnam War veteran is unable to receive government aid for dental work because his dental problems are not related to his military service. Guest Star: James Stacy
70	21	"Parents' Day"	Michael Landon	David Thoreau	February 25, 1987	7920	18.0/27
A student is arrested for drug possession, then brings the same charge against his father, a crusading TV news anchor who's secretly a cocaine addict. Guest Star: Robert Culp
71	22	"A Father's Faith"	Michael Landon	Ginny Weissman	March 4, 1987	7921	17.9/27
A fisherman friend of Mark's is paying too much attention to his comatose son, which threatens to destroy both his livelihood and his family. Guest Stars: Eli Wallach and Anne Jackson
72	23	"Heavy Date"	Michael Landon	Michael Landon	March 18, 1987	7922	19.1/30
A young man with no ambition in life falls in love with a pregnant girl. Guest Stars: Brittain Frye, Pat O'Bryan, Lorie Griffin
73	24	"Ghost Rider"	Michael Landon	Dan Gordon	April 1, 1987	7923	18.5/29
A spy novelist buys her hero's sports car, which comes with his ghost. Guest Stars: Alan Abelew, Didi Conn
74	25	"The Gift of Life"	Michael Landon	Dan Gordon	May 6, 1987	7924	14.1/25
Jonathan and Mark are hired as bodyguards for a wealthy man with no principles and no friends. Guest Star: Leslie Nielsen

=== Season 4 (1987–88) ===
Season 4 was filmed from May 1987 to March 1988. The show managed to finish filming this Season just as the 1988 WGA Strike was about to begin.

No. overall	No. in season	Title	Directed by	Written by	Original release date	Prod. code	Rating/share (households)
75	1	"Man's Best Friend: Part 1"	Michael Landon	Michael Landon	September 16, 1987	7951	16.6/28
A wealthy couple are unable to have more children, so they hire a surrogate. A dog runs away, but encounters a pack of coyotes in a secluded forest. Jonathan miraculously frightens them away by temporarily transforming into a male African lion. Guest Stars: Elisabeth Harnois, William Schallert
76	2	"Man's Best Friend: Part 2"	Michael Landon	Michael Landon	September 23, 1987	7952	15.6/27
Alex is reunited with his dog, but may lose him again when a foster family accepts him. Guest Star: Danny Pintauro
77	3	"Fighting for Your Life"	Michael Landon	Lan O'Kun	September 30, 1987	7955	13.5/23
A boxer reconsiders taking dives when a fighter he's been training is asked to take one himself. Guest Star: Clint Lilley
78	4	"The People Next Door"	Michael Landon	Vince R. Gutierrez	October 21, 1987	7956	14.9/23
A doctor is forced to confront a terrible secret when a black family plans to live next door to him. Guest Stars: David Spielberg, Míriam Colón
79	5	"I Was a Middle-Aged Werewolf"	Michael Landon	Michael Landon	October 28, 1987	7958	12.0/18
Jonathan turns into a werewolf on Halloween to help out a frightened trick-or-treater. Guest Star: Raffi Di Blasio
80	6	"Playing for Keeps"	Michael Landon	James Kearns	November 4, 1987	7954	13.1/21
Jonathan and Mark type-cast a retired comic and his movie-star son in a new play about a young man struggling to relate to his father. Guest Stars: Eric Douglas, Donald O'Connor
81	7	"Amazing Man"	Michael Landon	Elaine Newman & Ed Burnham	November 11, 1987	7957	15.6/24
A youngster turns to a comic book superhero to deal with his father's death. Guest Star: Pat Crawford Brown
82	8	"All the Colors of the Heart"	Michael Landon	Story by : Parke Perine and Tom Sullivan; Teleplay by : Parke Perine	November 18, 1987	7960	13.7/22
A blind athlete expecting to gain his sight must counsel a surfer threatened with losing his own. Guest Stars: Brandon Bluhm, Peter Kowanko, Tom Sullivan
83	9	"Why Punish the Children?"	Michael Landon	Paul W. Cooper	November 25, 1987	7961	13.7/24
Jonathan and Mark deal with a penal system that doesn't allow inmate mothers to see their children. Guest Stars: Mary Pat Gleason, Bebe Drake
84	10	"A Dream of Wild Horses"	Michael Landon	Story by : Laura Braunstein and Mary Cappelli Cruise; Teleplay by : Laura Braunstein, Mary Cappelli Cruise and Dan Gordon	December 2, 1987	7962	13.4/22
The patriarch of a family feels too old to take care of his horse ranch. Guest Star: Richard Farnsworth
85	11	"In with the 'In' Crowd"	Michael Landon	David Thoreau	December 9, 1987	7963	14.0/22
A policewoman goes undercover at a high school to expose a group of drug users, but could get suspended when Mark jeopardizes the operation. Guest Star: Cooper Layne
86	12	"With Love, the Claus"	Michael Landon	Dan Gordon	December 23, 1987	7959	14.1/25
At Christmastime, a man claiming to be Santa Claus wants a department store to stop using his name for promoting war toys and is arrested. The lawyers involved are a bickering divorced couple who are Jonathan and Mark's assignment - with the ex-husband defending "Santa" and the ex-wife representing the store. Guest Stars: Bill Erwin, Wendie Malick, John Calvin
87	13	"A Mother's Love"	Michael Landon	Vince R. Gutierrez	January 6, 1988	7964	17.4/26
To fulfill a promise to their dying mother, four brothers go on the run from a court order that would split them up. Guest Stars: Byron Thames, Doreen Lang
88	14	"Country Doctor"	Michael Landon	Dan Gordon	January 13, 1988	7953	16.2/24
A country doctor is working himself to death. Guest Star: Roscoe Lee Browne
89	15	"Time in a Bottle"	Michael Landon	Parke Perine	January 20, 1988	7965	16.9/26
A lawyer who's hit rock bottom agrees to defend his friend, another homeless man who's charged with robbing a liquor store. Guest Star: Alan Fudge
90	16	"Back to Oakland"	Michael Landon	David Thoreau	February 3, 1988	7967	15.5/24
The old saying "You can't go home again" may prove true when Mark returns to his old beat, which has become a racist storm. Guest Star: Eugene Jackson
91	17	"We Have Forever: Part 1"	Michael Landon	Michael Landon	February 10, 1988	7966	15.8/24
After his widow's death, Jonathan hopes to be reunited with her in Heaven, but when his request is refused he rebels and is stripped of his divine powers. Guest Star: Dorothy McGuire
92	18	"We Have Forever: Part 2"	Michael Landon	Michael Landon	February 17, 1988	7968	16.8/26
After turning his back on everyone and everything, a now-human and embittered Jonathan is offered shelter and help from a young woman. Guest Star: Leann Hunley
93	19	"The Correspondent"	Michael Landon	Lan O'Kun	February 24, 1988	7969	14.0/21
A correspondent about to be executed by revolutionaries somewhere in South America is shown what he's missed and lost by putting work ahead of his family. Guest Stars: Will Estes, Darren McGavin
94	20	"Aloha"	Michael Landon	Parke Perine	March 2, 1988	7970	12.8/19
A Hawaiian singer learns to overcome self-pity and pride when she's injured in a truck accident. Guest Star: Hartley Silver
95	21	"A Dolphin Song for Lee: Part 1"	Michael Landon	Dan Gordon	March 16, 1988	7971	14.4/23
Jonathan and Mark help a teenage cancer patient save the dolphins. Guest Star: Christine Healy
96	22	"A Dolphin Song for Lee: Part 2"	Michael Landon	Dan Gordon	March 23, 1988	7972	14.0/23
After Lee's operation, she continues her save-the-dolphins campaign. Guest Star: Natalie Gregory
97	23	"Heaven Nose, Mister Smith"	Michael Landon	Lan O'Kun	March 30, 1988	7973	13.8/22
Jonathan is dispatched to stop an angel from breaking up his son's marriage and receives help from an unexpected source. Guest Stars: Bob Hope, Bill Macy, John Pleshette
98	24	"The Whole Nine Yards"	Michael Landon	David Chomsky	April 27, 1988	7974	13.8/23
Jonathan and Mark enable a female wide receiver to play for a junior-high football team. Guest Stars: Chad Allen, Dinah Lacey, Beau Starr

=== Season 5 (1988–89) ===
Season 5 was filmed from August to December 1988. Only the first three episodes aired that year, with episode 4 airing in March 1989, and the last nine episodes airing later that summer. Many of the episodes this season were released posthumously after the death of Victor French on June 15, 1989, with the last episode airing on August 4 of that year.

No. overall	No. in season	Title	Directed by	Written by	Original release date	Prod. code	U.S. viewers (millions)	Rating/share (households)
99	1	"Whose Trash Is It Anyway?"	Michael Landon	David Thoreau	October 12, 1988	8001	16.5	12.8/20
Mark's friend Pete Nelson is running for mayor against a ruthless opponent. Jealousy prompts the mayor's son to plant drugs in the locker of Pete's son Jeff, creating scandal. Mark sets out to clear Jeff's name. Guest Star: David Spielberg
100	2	"Hello and Farewell"	Michael Landon	Vince R. Gutierrez	December 7, 1988	8003	16.7	11.8/18
101	3	"Hello and Farewell"	Michael Landon	Vince R. Gutierrez	December 7, 1988	8004	16.7	11.8/18
A nurse is still reeling from the Vietnam War and a 17-year-old discovers he is adopted. Kim goes to a veterans' counseling group and Jonathan consoles Major Hastings about his son. Guest Star: Matthew Perry: Originally shown as a feature-length episode, which was later cut into two separate episodes for syndication.
102	4	"The Silent Bell"	Michael Landon	Parke Perine	March 21, 1989	8005	18.4	12.5/19
A church council decision that Christianity must be taught in a multi-ethnic school causes major upheaval among the staff and students at the school. Guest Stars: Mimi Kuzyk, Dennis Lipscomb
103	5	"The Reunion"	Michael Landon	David Ketchum and Tony DiMarco	June 2, 1989	8011	10.7	7.4/16
Mark goes to his high school reunion where some of his friends' memories prove to be bittersweet. Guest Stars: Jesse Henecke, Lloyd Bochner, Eve Brent
104	6	"The Source"	Michael Landon	Elaine Newman and Ed Burnham	June 9, 1989	8007	10.4	7.4/15
A teenage girl tells two high school reporters (one of whom is the principal's son) that a school bus driver was coming on to her just before an accident. The story is published without verifying the facts, thus wrecking the driver's reputation and his career. Guest Star: Michele Scarabelli
105	7	"The Squeaky Wheel"	Michael Landon	Paul W. Cooper	June 16, 1989	8009	10.1	7.7/17
Following a false fire alarm, a vet in a wheelchair joins a crusade for the handicapped. Guest Star: Mary Pat Gleason
106	8	"Goodbye, Mr. Zelinka"	Michael Landon	Jerry Winnick	June 23, 1989	8008	10.1	7.3/17
A beloved teacher is forced to retire because of his age. Jonathan and Mark rally his students and the teaching staff against the school board in an effort to prevent the enforced retirement. Guest Stars: Brian Krause, Lew Ayres
107	9	"Choices"	Michael Landon	Parke Perine	June 30, 1989	8012	11.4	8.3/19
A Vietnamese couple come to America to find their sons after ten years of being separated. Jonathan and Mark help them achieve their goal, inadvertently tearing apart the sons' adoptive family when the elder son feels morally obligated to return to Vietnam with his biological parents. Guest Star: Haing S. Ngor
108	10	"Summer Camp"	Michael Landon	Story by : Tom Sullivan; Teleplay by : Jodie Lewis	July 14, 1989	8002	11.2	7.7/17
After being scarred for life in a fire, an actress/model takes a counseling job at a camp for blind children run by sightless athlete Frank Riley (last seen in "All the Colors of the Heart"). Meanwhile, a reluctant philanthropist's bigotry threatens the growing friendship between his son (who can see) and a fellow camper (who can't). Guest Stars: Priscilla Barnes, Tom Sullivan
109	11	"The Inner Limits"	Michael Landon	Lan O'Kun	July 21, 1989	8006	10.9	7.7/17
Hoping to overcome his mother's insistence that his paralyzed brother is fully aware and get him the institutional care he needs, a young man consults a doctor, only to be advised that his brother is not only fully aware but capable of communication. Guest Star: Julianna McCarthy
110	12	"It's a Dog's Life"	Michael Landon	Parke Perine	July 28, 1989	8010	10.1	7.1/16
After complaining that Jonathan's angelic powers give him an unfair advantage, Mark thinks Jonathan has been turned into a dog as he deals with a runaway kid and his ditzy parents. Guest Star: Kimberley Conrad
111	13	"Merry Christmas from Grandpa"	Michael Landon	Michael Landon	August 4, 1989	8013	10.5	7.1/16
On Christmas Eve, Jonathan presents a future ravaged by pollution to three different people: a tycoon, a farmer and the President of the United States. Guest Star: Harriet Sansom Harris
