= Mikey Gow =

Ambidextrous high school quarterback

Micheal Gow
Missouri Baptist Spartans
- Position: Quarterback

Personal information
- Born: 2007 (age 18–19); Bellevue, Nebraska, U.S.
- Listed height: 6 ft 1 in (1.85 m)
- Listed weight: 170 lb (77 kg)

Career information
- High school: Bellevue East High School; Mustang High School; Omaha North High School
- College: Missouri Baptist University

Micheal “Mikey” Gow (born 2007) is an American ambidextrous Freshman quarterback who plays for the Missouri Baptist Spartans

== Early life ==
At age 9, an injury prevented Gow from using his right arm for almost a year. His mother suggested that he try throwing with his left arm. He developed the use of his left arm but he claims that his right arm is stronger and more fluid.

== High school ==
Gow played American football for Bellevue East High School in Nebraska. Gow started as a freshman quarterback during the 2021 season and had a 2–7 record. He started his sophomore year at Bellevue East but on September 2, 2022, he broke his right wrist in a 42–0 loss to Norfolk. It was the second game of the 2022 season and it was determined that Gow would miss the rest of the season.

A video posted of Gow demonstrating his ability was posted to SportsCenter's Twitter page May 18, 2022 and it accumulated over 2 million views. The 30-second video which showed him throwing footballs accurately with both hands became a viral video. After seeing the video, NFL quarterback Lamar Jackson stated that Gow will be a #1 overall pick in the NFL. As of May 2022, Gow was being scouted by Notre Dame, Michigan, Oklahoma State and Texas.

Gow transferred to Mustang High School in Oklahoma for the 2023 football season.

In 2024, Gow was selected for the U20 U.S. Tackle National Team to compete in the IFAF Junior World Championship. He was the backup QB for the team who finished 4th in the tournament. Gow is returning to Nebraska to play for Omaha North High School in the 2024–25 school year.

== College ==
Gow committed to Missouri Baptist University to play Quarterback in February 2026.

On September 26th, Gow would make his college debut for the Spartans against Mount Mercy University. Gow would lead the Spartans to a 16-point comeback victory with Missouri Baptist scoring 28 unanswered points.

Gow would go 10 of 13 for 159 passing yards throwing two touchdowns, along with 57 rushing yards on 12 carries.

== See also ==
- Switch pitcher, baseball pitchers who can throw the ball with either arm
