= Bellevue West High School =

Location
- 1501 Thurston Ave; Bellevue, Nebraska 68123; 41°09′48″N 95°56′11″W

Information
- School type: Senior high school
- Founded: 1977
- School board: Bellevue Public Schools
- Principal: Kevin Rohlfs
- Staff: 94.80 (FTE)
- Grades: 9-12
- Enrollment: 1,558 (2023–2024)
- Student to teacher ratio: 16.43
- Language: English
- Colors: Purple, gold, and white
- Mascot: The Thunderbirds
- Team name: Thunderbirds
- Website: Bellevue West H.S.

Bellevue West High School is a public secondary school located in Bellevue, Nebraska, United States. It had a 2013 enrollment of 1,584 students. The principal is Kevin Rohlfs. The school's athletic teams are the Thunderbirds, and their school colors are purple, gold, and white. The school's cross-town rival is Bellevue East. Bellevue West is accredited by the North Central Association Commission on Accreditation and School Improvement. The school also serves as an off-campus location for the Omaha, Nebraska, Metropolitan Community College.

== Extracurricular activities ==
=== Athletics ===
==== Boys Athletics ====
- Fall: Football, Tennis, Cross Country
- Winter: Basketball, Bowling, Swimming & Diving, Wrestling
- Spring: Baseball, Golf, Soccer. Track & Field

==== Girls Athletics ====
- Fall: Cross Country, Golf, Softball, Volleyball
- Winter: Basketball, Bowling, Swimming & Diving
- Spring: Soccer, Track & Field, Tennis

=== State championships ===
State championships
Season	Sport/activity	Number of championships	Year
Fall	Volleyball	12	1989, 1990, 1992, 1993, 1994, 1995, 1996, 1997, 2003, 2004, 2005, 2006
Fall	Football	2	2016, 2019
Winter	Bowling, boys'	4	2001, 2005, 2006, 2007
Winter	Bowling, boys'	3	2004, 2006, 2007
Winter	Basketball, boys'	6	2000, 2004, 2005, 2014, 2020, 2023, 2024
Winter	Basketball, girls'	3	2007, 2009, 2010
Spring	Baseball	1	1978
Total		28	

=== Non-athletic programs ===
==== Music ====
The school's instrumental music department has four concert bands (Concert, Symphonic, Wind Symphony, and Wind Ensemble), two jazz bands, and a marching band.

The school's vocal music department consists of three main concert choirs (Concert Choir, Arie Armonie, West High Singers) as well as a varsity-level competitive show choir (West Connection), a contemporary a cappella group (Project 424) and other small ensembles.

==== Theater ====
W.A.S.T (West After School Theater) is Bellevue West’s drama club. Meetings occur after school once a week.

The theater department puts on several shows every year. Including the spring musical, fall play, 24 hour play festival, ten minute play festival, and one act showcase.

West is home to thespian troupe #4238.

== Notable alumni ==
- Chucky Hepburn, Professional basketball player, Toronto Raptors class of 2021
- Mike Slaton, NFL player for the Minnesota Vikings
- Erick Strickland, professional basketball player, class of 1992
- Thakoon Panichgul, Thai-American fashion designer, class of 1993
- Cade Povich, MLB Pitcher with the Baltimore Orioles
- Mark Traynowicz, NFL player for the Buffalo Bills and Arizona Cardinals
