= Dennis Byrd =

American football player (1966–2016)

- Byrd in 2012

No. 90
- Position: Defensive end

Personal information
- Born: October 5, 1966; Oklahoma City, Oklahoma, U.S.
- Died: October 15, 2016 (aged 50); Claremore, Oklahoma, U.S.
- Listed height: 6 ft 5 in (1.96 m)
- Listed weight: 270 lb (122 kg)

Career information
- High school: Mustang (Mustang, Oklahoma)
- College: Tulsa
- NFL draft: 1989: 2nd round, 42nd overall pick

Career history
- New York Jets (1989–1992)

Awards and highlights
- New York Jets No. 90 retired

Career NFL statistics
- Sacks: 28
- Safeties: 1
- Stats at Pro Football Reference

Dennis DeWayne Byrd (October 5, 1966 – October 15, 2016) was an American professional football player who was a defensive end and defensive tackle for the New York Jets of the National Football League (NFL). He played college football for the Tulsa Golden Hurricane. He played for the Jets for four seasons beginning in 1989. Over his four seasons, he recorded 28 sacks and 110 tackles. His career ended when he was paralyzed following a collision with a teammate during a game. Through rehabilitation, he later managed to walk again.

Byrd was killed in a car crash near Claremore, Oklahoma, on October 15, 2016, ten days after his 50th birthday.

== Career ==
Byrd attended Mustang High School in Mustang, Oklahoma. In his senior year, he was named an All-State defensive end. He enrolled at the University of Tulsa, where he played college football for the Tulsa Golden Hurricane. Byrd started for the Golden Hurricane defense for four seasons, registering 321 tackles and 20 quarterback sacks. College Football News selected Byrd as an All-American honorable mention after his senior season, where he had 108 tackles, 11 sacks, and 35 quarterback hurries.

Pre-draft measurables
Height	Weight	40-yard dash	10-yard split	20-yard split	20-yard shuttle	Vertical jump	Broad jump	Bench press
6 ft 4 5/8 in (1.95 m)	261 lb (118 kg)	4.97 s	1.72 s	2.89 s	4.58 s	29.0 in (0.74 m)	8 ft 8 in (2.64 m)	22 reps
All values from NFL Combine

The New York Jets of the National Football League (NFL) selected Byrd in the second round of the 1989 NFL draft, with the hope that he could succeed Mark Gastineau. He played for the Jets as a backup defensive end in a 3–4 defense in 1989, registering seven sacks. The Jets switched to a 4–3 defense in 1990, and Byrd became a defensive tackle that season. Byrd made 13 sacks in 1990 and seven sacks in 1991. He again played as a defensive end in 1992. Byrd missed a month of the 1992 season due to a shoulder injury.

== Injury and recovery ==
Byrd suffered a neck injury during an NFL game against the Kansas City Chiefs on November 29, 1992. During the play, he rushed in an attempt to sack Chiefs quarterback Dave Krieg, but Krieg stepped up to avoid the tackle, and Byrd collided with Jets teammate Scott Mersereau. He ducked his head at the last moment before he collided with Mersereau's chest. The head-first collision broke his fifth cervical vertebrae and left him unable to walk.

During his recovery, the Jets briefly used an ichthys logo bearing his uniform number, No. 90. After extensive physical therapy, Byrd walked again, but could no longer return to playing football.

Byrd returned to the Meadowlands for the Jets' home opener on September 5, 1993, walking to midfield as an honorary captain for the coin toss. During a halftime ceremony, Jets president Steve Gutman presented him with a trophy for the Most Inspirational Player Award, which would thereafter be called the Dennis Byrd Award.

== Later life ==
The Jets retired Byrd's No. 90 during a half-time ceremony on October 28, 2012, against the Miami Dolphins. However, it had been informally retired for some time before then; the Jets had not reissued No. 90 since Byrd's injury.

Byrd was the co-author with journalist Michael D'Orso of an autobiographical work titled Rise and Walk: The Trial and Triumph of Dennis Byrd and the subject of a made-for-television film Rise and Walk: The Dennis Byrd Story. Peter Berg played him in the movie.

Byrd spent several years traveling across the country and sharing his life story. He served as defensive line coach at Owasso High School in Owasso, Oklahoma and later at Lincoln Christian School in Tulsa. He lived outside of Tulsa with his wife, the former Angela Hales, and their four children. He was a devout Pentecostal.

During the week leading up to the 2010–11 AFC Divisional matchup between the Jets and the Patriots, Byrd sent Jets' head coach Rex Ryan his tattered, cut up jersey that had been cut from his body on the day of his injury along with an inspirational letter addressed to the Jets. Ryan was so moved by this that he invited him to come out and personally address the team prior to the Patriots game. The inspired Jets carried his jersey to the coin toss prior to the game; the Jets won 28–21.

== Personal life ==
Byrd was the third child of five born to Daniel and Nancy Byrd. He was born in Oklahoma City. Dennis and his wife Angela were married December 20, 1986 and had four children.

== Death ==
Byrd was killed at approximately 11:15 a.m. on October 15, 2016, in a two-vehicle collision on Oklahoma State Highway 88 between Claremore and Oologah. According to the Oklahoma Highway Patrol report, a 17-year-old driver from Claremore veered his Ford Explorer into the oncoming lane, colliding with Byrd's Hummer H2. Byrd was 50 years old. His 12-year-old son, who was a passenger, was also injured in the crash.
