= Mustang Public Schools =

School district in Oklahoma, USA

Mustang Public Schools, often shortened to MPS, is a public school system headquartered in Mustang, Oklahoma and serving pre-kindergarten through 12th grade in Mustang and Oklahoma City.

The district, mostly in Canadian County, includes all of Mustang and parts of Oklahoma City (OKC). The district extends into portions of OKC in Cleveland County and Oklahoma County.

The district is known state-wide for its unparalleled growth. The number of students in the district increases by about 1000 each year, with about 1,500 more students attending in 2021 than 2020. The district is the largest in the county.

== Schools ==
=== Secondary ===
High school:

- Mustang High School

Middle schools:

- Mustang Middle School
- Mustang North Middle School
- Central Middle School

=== Primary ===
Intermediate schools:

- Canyon Ridge Intermediate
- Mustang Horizon Intermediate
- Meadow Brook Intermediate

Elementary and Prekindergarten:

- Centennial Elementary
- Mustang Creek Elementary
- Mustang Elementary
- Lakehoma Elementary
- Mustang Trails Elementary
- Mustang Valley Elementary
- Prairie View Elementary
- Riverwood Elementary
- Sunset Hill Elementary

=== All-purpose / Vocational ===
- Mustang Education Center
