= Johann Carlo =

American actress

- Born: May 21, 1957 (age 68); Buffalo, New York, U.S.

Johann Carlo (born May 21, 1957) is an American actress.

== Early life ==
Carlo was born in Buffalo, New York.

== Career ==
She made her Broadway debut in 1983, appearing as Louise in Plenty. In 1991, she returned to Broadway for La Bête. She was commissioned by the Whitney Museum to write, direct and perform in the musical It's Still Life, which went on to tour in India and Morocco. She has also written and acted in several performance pieces.

In 1986, she was cast as Dixie, the cabbie who introduced the King of Cartoons from Pee-wee's Playhouse. Dixie appeared only in the show's first season.

Carlo has also been seen in the TV shows Crime Story (1986), Law & Order (1991, 1997) and Chicago Hope (1995). She had a recurring role on The Sopranos (1999) as Bonnie DiCaprio.

Carlo's film debut was in 1989 as a performance artist in Merchant Ivory's Slaves of New York, singing "Say Hi to Your Guy", a song she wrote, with Michael Butler. She appeared in Reversal of Fortune (1990), Quiz Show (1994), Looking for Richard (1996), and Happiness (1998).

== Filmography ==
=== Film ===
Year	Title	Role	Notes
1989	Prisoners of Inertia	Lisa	
1989	Slaves of New York	Performance artist	
1990	Reversal of Fortune	Nancy	
1994	Quiz Show	Toby Stempel	
1995	Fair Game	Jodi Kirkpatrick	
1996	Looking for Richard	—N/a	Documentary
1998	Happiness	Betty Grasso	
1999	24 Nights	Geneva	
1999	Cherry	Nurse	
2001	The Next Big Thing	'Absolutist' Woman	
2011	Silver Tongues	Flora	
2011	Margaret	Neighbor	

=== Television ===
Year	Title	Role	Notes
1984	Nadia	Older Nadia Comăneci	Television film
1984	ABC Afterschool Special	Patti DiAngelo	Episode: "Out of Step"
1984, 1985	CBS Schoolbreak Special	Mary Judson / Consuela Fabian	2 episodes
1985	Tales from the Darkside	Iris	Episode: "In the Cards"
1985	Doubletake	Prostitute	Miniseries
1986	Pee-wee's Playhouse	Dixie	13 episodes
1986–1987	Crime Story	Cori Luca	12 episodes
1991, 1997	Law & Order	Mrs. Jeffrey Zabner / Colman	2 episodes
1994	Rise and Walk: The Dennis Byrd Story	Joanne	Television film
1995	Chicago Hope	Mrs. Concannon	Episode: "Freeze Outs"
1995	Ed McBain's 87th Precinct: Lightning	Sarah Meyer	Television film
1995	Central Park West	Lisa Monroe	2 episodes
1999	The Sopranos	Bonnie DiCaprio	2 episodes
1999	Third Watch	Sylvia Rossetti	Episode: "Impulse"
2002	Hysterical Blindness	Susan	Television film
2010, 2013	Boardwalk Empire	Teresina Capone	2 episodes
