= Bellevue Public Schools =

School District in Nebraska, United States

Bellevue Public Schools operates 15 elementary schools (K-6; some schools also offer pre-kindergarten programs), three middle schools (7–8), and two high schools (9–12) in Bellevue in the U.S. state of Nebraska. The district has 662 teachers (FTEs) serving 9,666 students.

The district includes most of Bellevue, and almost all of Offutt Air Force Base.

School facts
School	Students	FTE teachers	Student/teacher ratio	Notes
Avery Elementary School	303			Originally named South School, Avery Elementary was opened in 1916. It is home to the Avery Tigers.
Belleaire Elementary School	249			Bellaire Elementary was opened in 1952. It is home to the Bellaire Panthers.
Bellevue East High School	1701	85.8	15.8	
Bellevue Elementary				
Bellevue West High School	1665	86.6	16.3	
Bertha Barber Elementary School	180	12.1	14.9	
Betz Elementary School	338	22.1	15.3	
Birchcrest Elementary School	327	20.3	16.1	
C H A P School	51	5.4	9.4	Special education, pre-kindergarten to 12th grade
Central Elementary School	161	10.4	15.5	
Fairview Elementary School	363	27.7	13.1	
Fort Crook Elementary School	358	24.1	14.9	
Lemay Elementary School	419	28.8	14.5	
Leonard Lawrence Elementary School	508	29.3	17.3	
Logan Fontenelle Middle School	741	47.7	15.5	Seventh-grade educational teams are named Team Valor and Integrity. Eighth-grade teams are All-Stars and Supreme. Combined team is named Unity. The Patriots teams is a special needs team. School nickname is the Warriors.
Lewis & Clark Middle School				Seventh grade educational teams are named Travelers, Rangers, and Navigators. Eighth grade teams are Explorers and Surveyors. School nickname is the Scouts.
Mission Middle School	667	47.4	30	Seventh grade educational teams are named Phoenix, and Intrepid. Eighth grade educational teams are named Thunder and Storm. School nickname is Braves.
Peter Sarpy Elementary School	446	30.3	14.7	
Twin Ridge Elementary School	293	19.1	15.3	
Two Springs Elementary School	370	23.3	15.9	
Wake Robin Elementary School	359	19.6	18.3	

Note: Based on 2002–2003 school year data

== See also ==
- List of school districts in Nebraska
