= Highway to Heaven =

American television series (1984–1989)

- Genre: Fantasy; Family drama
- Created by: Michael Landon
- Directed by: Michael Landon; Victor French; Dan Gordon; William F. Claxton
- Starring: Michael Landon; Victor French
- Composer: David Rose
- Country of origin: United States
- Original language: English
- No. of seasons: 5
- No. of episodes: 111 (list of episodes)

Production
- Executive producer: Michael Landon
- Producer: Kent McCray
- Camera setup: Single-camera
- Running time: 48–49 minutes
- Production company: Michael Landon Productions

Original release
- Network: NBC
- Release: September 19, 1984 – August 4, 1989

Highway to Heaven is an American fantasy drama television series that ran on NBC from September 19, 1984, to August 4, 1989. The series starred its creator and co-director Michael Landon as Jonathan Smith, an angel sent to Earth to help people in need. Victor French, Landon's co-star from his previous television series, Little House on the Prairie, co-starred as Mark Gordon, a retired policeman who travels with and helps Smith with the tasks or "assignments" to which he is referred. Landon directed most of the show's episodes, and French directed many of the remaining ones. It was Landon's third and final TV series and his only one set in the present day, unlike Little House on the Prairie, and Landon's first TV series, Bonanza, both of which were Westerns. It was the final screen appearance for French, who died two months before the final episode aired, aged 54 years old.

Highway to Heaven aired for five seasons, running a total of 111 episodes. It consistently earned respectable ratings; it was in the Nielsen Top 20 in its first season, and ranked in the Top 40 for its first four seasons.

== Plot and themes ==
Jonathan Smith is a "probationary" angel sent to Earth to help people in need. In the course of an "assignment", he meets Mark Gordon, an embittered retired policeman now bouncing from job to job. At first distrustful of Jonathan, Mark helps him complete his assignment and comes to believe in his true nature. He volunteers to assist Jonathan in helping troubled people on Earth, feeling that Jonathan needs a companion in his lonely mission, and "The Boss" (a.k.a. God) approves. Jonathan and Mark are given assignments in which they help troubled souls overcome their problems.

Each episode typically begins with Jonathan and Mark arriving in a new city and taking jobs as business employees or civil service workers as part of their latest assignment. Due to Jonathan's angelic nature, the two can work as police officers, medical personnel, teachers, social workers or other skilled employees (background checks or employment history verification being divinely provided or somehow never looked into), allowing for a variety of identities and scenarios. Both Jonathan and Mark face the same difficulties as people on Earth trying to rectify these problems and have little to aid them beyond a bare outline of their assignment. At certain times Jonathan presents gifts to others, such as decorating a drab nursing home with flowers or giving someone a bicycle. These material gifts likely come from "The Boss", but when asked, he answers only "A friend of mine provided them." When necessary, "The Boss" provides the protagonists with divine intervention or as Jonathan and Mark refer to it, "The Stuff". An early season-one episode, "The Return of the Masked Rider", establishes that Jonathan is not given "The Stuff" if he acts contrary to God's will. This rule would be often referred to in later episodes but would also be at times ignored or forgotten; for example, in the episode "The Secret" Jonathan uses "The Stuff" in direct defiance of God's orders.

Early episodes generally left it ambiguous whether Jonathan is an angel in the original sense of the term or a deceased human being, but the cold open of the season-one episode "Hotel of Dreams" has a scene in which Jonathan mentions to Mark that he died of lung cancer attributed to his tobacco smoking habit. In the season-two episode "Keep Smiling" it is revealed that "Jonathan Smith" is Arthur Thompson, a man who lived on Earth from September 7, 1917 to March 21, 1948. The season three episode "Love at Second Sight" further explains that angels sent to Earth are given different bodies so that they will not be recognized by anyone who knew them when they were alive.

The series aimed to address contemporary social and emotional issues with sensitivity, and also with humor, particularly between Jonathan and Mark. Their personalities often clash (Jonathan being more sensible and compassionate, but sometimes naïve, and Mark being more pragmatic and cynical), but they always support each other. Jonathan's mission on Earth is to do enough good to gain his wings and, presumably, ascend to Heaven. As Jonathan and Mark develop a close relationship and Jonathan is in better favor with his superiors, Mark is torn between losing his best friend as opposed to being happy for Jonathan's being promoted to Heaven and considers impeding the process.

== Production ==
=== Development ===
Landon said in a 1985 People interview that he made a promise to God when his daughter was in a coma that he would create something to help people.

Recalling how he came up with the idea for Highway to Heaven, director/executive producer/star Michael Landon said, "I was driving through Beverly Hills to pick up my kids on a Friday night, and people were honking at each other. There is no worse place for that than Beverly Hills; I think when people have a little bit more money, they believe that the Red Sea will part and their car will go forward. And I thought, 'Why is everybody so angry? If they would just spend that same time being nice ... It’s obvious the flow of traffic is going to go much better if everybody has his opportunity.'"

NBC executives were skeptical when Landon pitched the idea to them, feeling it would be an easy target for television critics, but Landon was persistent, even vowing that if the pilot episode failed to perform well with test audiences, he would produce a second pilot for the series for no pay.

Victor French and Michael Landon in character as Mark Gordon and Jonathan Smith, respectively

=== Casting ===
Landon personally chose Victor French for the part of Mark Gordon, having become familiar with French and his acting technique while working with him on Little House on the Prairie and Bonanza.

Quadriplegic actor James Troesh had a small part in the two-part season-one episode "A Fresh Batch of Lemonade" as attorney Scotty Wilson. He later persuaded Landon to do an episode ("A Match Made in Heaven") in which Scotty becomes romantically involved with Mark Gordon's cousin Diane, loosely based on Troesh's real-life romance with his wife. Both Troesh and Margie Impert (who played Diane) continued to make appearances on the show during seasons two and three.

=== Filming ===
The final scene of the feature-length pilot episode was filmed along Dawn Road, south of Tucson, Arizona. Part of this scene was spliced together with footage of Mark picking Jonathan up in his car to form the show's title sequence. This additional footage (which does not appear in the story content of any episode) was filmed along Soledad Canyon Road near Acton, California.

Most scenes of the series were filmed on location in Los Angeles. Other filming locations included Simi Valley, Stanislaus National Forest, and Tuolumne County, all in California. The second-season episode "To Bind the Wounds" was partially filmed at Davis-Monthan Air Force Base in Tucson, where the World War II B-25 Mitchell Bomber was located. Though the crew scouted locations, Landon himself never visited filming locations before the shoot, preferring the spontaneity of working in an unfamiliar location and trusting his crew to pick somewhere suited to the script's needs. Scenes which were filmed on sound stages instead of on location (for purposes of controlled lighting and other special needs) were shot consecutively, with the crew often filming scenes for several different episodes in a single day. Mark's car, central to travel by Mark and Jonathan in the series, was a 1977 Ford LTD II.

=== Theme song ===
The melancholy theme for Highway to Heaven was composed by David Rose.

== Cancellation ==
In June 1988, amid the 1988 Writers Guild of America strike, NBC decided that season five would be Highway to Heaven's last since the show was falling in the ratings. The show's 5th-season premiere aired in the fall; after that one episode, the series was removed from NBC's regular broadcast schedule entirely. A two-hour special aired on December 7, but Highway To Heaven was not at that point reinstated as a regular series, though 10 further episodes had been filmed.

Michael Landon made an appearance on The Tonight Show Starring Johnny Carson on March 10, 1989, and explained the series' cancellation. One further Highway to Heaven episode was broadcast on March 21, but again the series was not scheduled regularly. Finally, the nine remaining season 5 episodes were burned off and aired in a Friday time slot in the summer of 1989 beginning June 2. The series finale (which was a Christmas-themed episode) aired on August 4.

Even if the series had performed well enough to warrant renewal, Victor French would have been unable to continue with it, since he had been diagnosed with lung cancer in March 1989 shortly after completing filming for the fifth season. He died that June.

== Michael Landon's 30-year run on NBC network ==
The cancellation of Highway to Heaven also marked the end of Landon's 30-year relationship with NBC, in which he co-starred on Bonanza and Little House on the Prairie; on the latter, like with Highway to Heaven, he also served as an executive producer and director for the majority of episodes. Landon's last public appearance was on NBC, as a guest on The Tonight Show Starring Johnny Carson, less than two months before he died in July 1991. During his 30-year run on NBC primetime programming, he was a frequent host of special events and co-hosted nearly a decade of Rose Bowl Parade coverage broadcast worldwide, along with KNBC anchor Kelly Lange.

== Broadcast history and nielsen ratings ==
Season	Episodes	Originally released	
Season	Episodes	First released	Last released
1	25	September 19, 1984	May 8, 1985
2	24	September 18, 1985	May 7, 1986
3	25	September 24, 1986	May 6, 1987
4	24	September 16, 1987	April 27, 1988
5	13	October 12, 1988	August 4, 1989

For its first three seasons, Highway to Heaven consistently ranked among the Top 25 shows on network TV. Part of NBC's success for 1984–1985 was a result of the show's popularity.

Season	Time slot (ET)	Rank	Rating
1984–85	Wednesday at 8:00–9:00 pm	19	17.7
1985–86	Wednesday at 8:00–9:00 pm	13	20.1
1986–87	Wednesday at 8:00–9:00 pm	24	17.2
1987–88	Wednesday at 8:00–9:00 pm	38	14.6
1988–89	Wednesday at 8:00–9:00 pm (Episode 1); Wednesday at 8:00–10:00 pm (Episodes 2, 3); Tuesday at 8:00–9:00 pm (Episode 4); Friday at 8:00–9:00 pm (Episode 5–13)		

== Syndication ==
Beginning in September 1989, the series was syndicated by Genesis Entertainment. Since then, it has also been rerun on cable networks UP and INSP, digital subchannel networks Cozi TV, Retro TV & Light TV, and the LeSEA Broadcasting Networks of WHT (World Harvest Television) and FETV (Family Entertainment Television). It has also aired on BYUtv.

All five seasons were released for streaming on Netflix in June 2017, and Hallmark Movies Now, Dove Channel, Christian-based VOD service Pure Flix, and the FilmOn channel on Roku. In 2020 the series was added to the Living Scriptures streaming service. The series, as of 2025, remains available on the Freeview (UK) platform broadcasting on, Great! TV channel and its free to air sister channels.

== Home media ==
In Region 1, A&E Home Video (under license from the estate and production company of Michael Landon) released the first three seasons on DVD in 2005–06. The episodes contained in these releases were the edited, syndicated versions and not the original broadcast versions. Due to poor sales, the final two seasons were never released.

In 2013, Mill Creek Entertainment acquired the rights to the series. They subsequently re-released the first four seasons on DVD in June, with Season 1 containing original uncut episodes and Season 3 containing mostly uncut episodes. Season 4 was released on June 3, 2014. The fifth and final season was released on September 16, 2014. All seasons would be released as a box set in November 2014.

In Region 2, Paramount Home Entertainment and CBS DVD have released all five seasons on DVD in France under the title Les Routes Du Paradis (The Roads of Paradise),

Seasons 1 to 4 have been released in Germany under the title Ein Engel auf Erden, while in the Netherlands, the first two seasons have been released on DVD.

Revelation Films acquired the rights to the series in the UK and has released all five seasons on DVD, in addition to Highway to Heaven – The Complete Collection (released in November 2013), a 30-disc set featuring all 111 episodes of the series, as well as bonus features.

In Region 4, Paramount Home Entertainment & CBS DVD released the first three seasons on DVD in Australia for the first time in 2008/2009. The episodes contained in these releases are the edited, syndicated versions and not the original broadcast versions. Seasons 4 and 5 were to be released on DVD on December 24, 2009, but the releases never materialized.

In 2012, Madman Entertainment acquired the rights to the series and subsequently released all five seasons on DVD. These releases, like the previous releases from Paramount, contain edited episodes, not the original broadcast versions.

Most recently, the entire series has been remastered in HD from the original film negatives and most episodes now appear to be complete. The transfers have also been opened out on the sides and slightly cropped top and bottom to create a 1.78:1 aspect ratio image, as opposed to the original 1.33:1.

The remastered series has been released in complete Blu-ray and DVD box sets in the US (Visual Entertainment Inc.) and Germany (Pidax Film).

DVD name	Ep #	Release dates					
DVD name	Ep #	Region 1	Region 2 (France)	Region 2 (Germany)	Region 2 (Germany remastered)	Region 2 (UK)	Region 4
Season 1	25	May 14, 2013	April 17, 2008	December 11, 2008	December 12, 2014	June 4, 2012	March 7, 2012
Season 2	24	October 1, 2013	October 9, 2008	March 5, 2009	May 8, 2015	October 29, 2012	March 7, 2012
Season 3	25	January 21, 2014	June 18, 2009	December 12, 2009	September 18, 2015	February 11, 2013	March 7, 2012
Season 4	24	June 3, 2014	June 18, 2009	March 4, 2010	December 11, 2015	July 29, 2013	October 3, 2012
Season 5	13	September 16, 2014	December 1, 2009	N/A	March 18, 2016	October 7, 2013	October 2, 2013
Complete Series	111	November 11, 2014	N/A	N/A	March 23, 2018	November 25, 2013	N/A

== Reboot film series ==
Lifetime produced a film series reboot, starring Jill Scott and Barry Watson and directed by Stacey K. Black. The film premiered on November 6, 2021.

== Reboot television series ==
On May 6, 2026, it was announced that Fox had greenlit a television series reboot to premiere sometime during the 2027–28 season.

== See also ==
- List of films about angels
- God Friended Me – similar concept
- Heaven Help Us - a recently deceased couple return to earth to help people, with the assistance of an angel.
- Touched by an Angel – similar concept
- Twice in a Lifetime – an aspiring angel helps guide the prematurely deceased into heaven
- Heaven Can Wait
- City of Angels
