= Switch pitcher =

Baseball pitcher who can throw with both arms

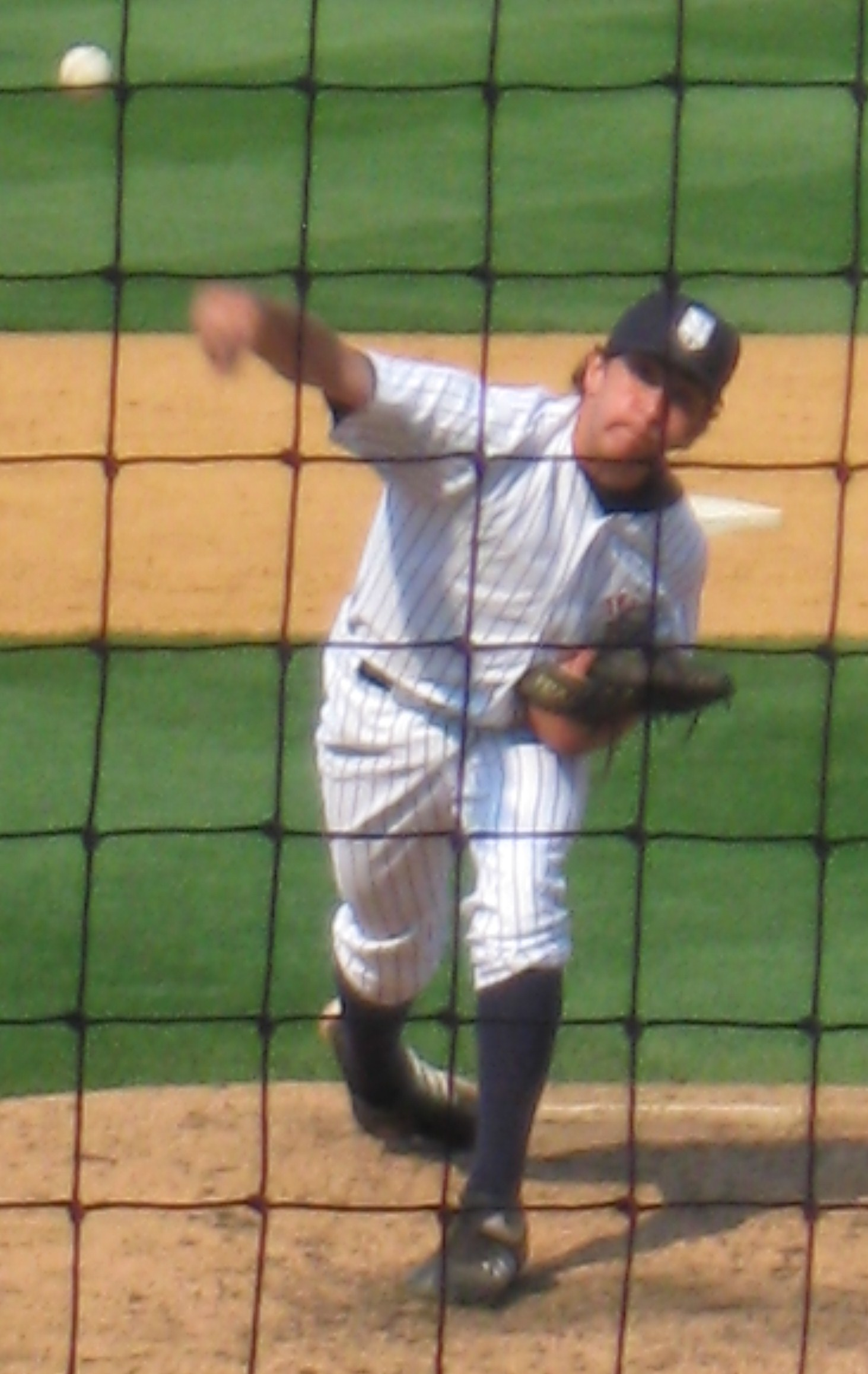
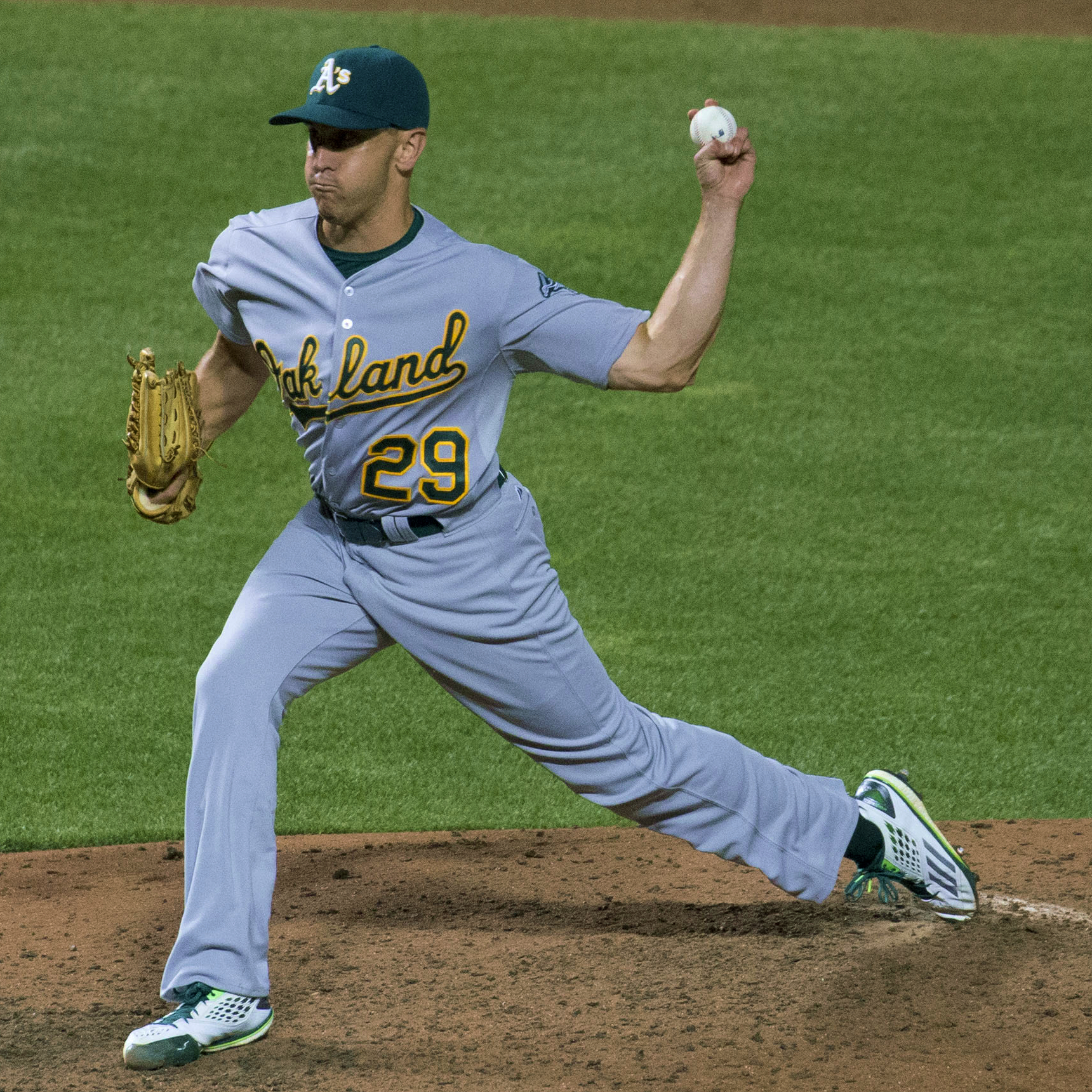
Pat Venditte pitching right-handed for the Staten Island Yankees in 2008 and left-handed for the Oakland Athletics in 2015

In baseball, a switch pitcher is an ambidextrous pitcher who is able to pitch with either the right or left hand from the pitcher's mound. (Note: The term should not be confused with a pitcher who bats either right-handed or left-handed, as a switch hitter.) Switch pitchers are rare at higher levels of competition, with Pat Venditte being the only pitcher to regularly throw with both arms in Major League Baseball since 1901.

== History ==
=== Professional baseball ===
==== 19th century ====
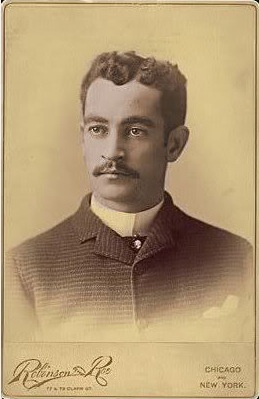
Tony Mullane

Four 19th-century pitchers are known to have thrown with both hands:

- Tony Mullane, whose major-league career spanned from 1881 to 1894, is listed as both as switch pitcher and switch hitter.
- Larry Corcoran, whose major-league career lasted from 1880 to 1887, is listed as a right-handed pitcher and switch hitter, but he pitched four innings alternating between his right arm and left arm on June 16, 1884, due to injury.
- Elton "Ice Box" Chamberlain, whose major-league career was from 1886 to 1896, was listed as a right-handed pitcher and batter. He pitched four innings left-handed in a minor-league game on May 9, 1888.
- George Wheeler, whose major-league career spanned from 1896 to 1899, was listed as both as switch pitcher and switch hitter, but he "threw left-handed a handful of times."

==== 20th century ====
Paul Richards, a major league catcher from 1932 to 1946, occasionally was a switch pitcher for the Muskogee Chiefs in the minor league Western Association. He hurt his left arm playing football in 1929 or 1930 and no longer pitched as a lefty. He also claimed that in high school, he threw two complete games in two days, throwing with both arms in both games.

In a 1940 newspaper article, Jimmy Brown, who played in the major leagues between 1937 and 1946, primarily for the St. Louis Cardinals, said that he learned to throw with either arm at a young age after breaking his right arm and was a switch pitcher during high school. Brown played exclusively as an infielder during his major-league career.

Larry Kimbrough pitched in Negro league baseball from 1942 to 1948. He was naturally left-handed, but he learned to throw right-handed as a child while recovering from an injury. He said, "I could throw them as hard left-handed as I could right-handed, with a better curveball left-handed." Independent accounts verifying that Kimbrough operated as a switch pitcher during his baseball career are lacking, but Kimbrough claimed that he earned a complete game victory in 1943 pitching from both sides.

A 1944 newspaper article noted that Cal McLish, then a right-handed rookie pitcher with the Brooklyn Dodgers, could throw with either arm, but there is no record of McLish ever doing so in a major-league game. McLish claimed to have thrown one pitch left-handed during a game in Venezuela.

Ulysses Greene pitched for the independent Indianapolis Clowns from 1958 until at least 1961, throwing with both hands. The Clowns were a barnstorming team with comedic acts, which included Greene performing a jitterbug dance routine. Clowns owner Syd Pollock stated that MLB teams were interested in signing Greene in 1960, though Greene never played in affiliated baseball.

Right-handed pitcher Jorge Rubio, who pitched for the California Angels in 1966 and 1967, claimed that he had experimented as a switch pitcher in high school and could throw with "the same speed left-handed" but with less control. Following the 1967 season, he pitched some games left-handed in winter league baseball to rest his right arm and continued doing so into spring training.

Shozo Yoshinari pitched in three games for the California League's Lodi Crushers in 1966. He had signed with the San Francisco Giants, who released him before he played in the affiliated minor leagues. He had pitched in the Japanese minor leagues for the Yomiuri Giants in 1964.

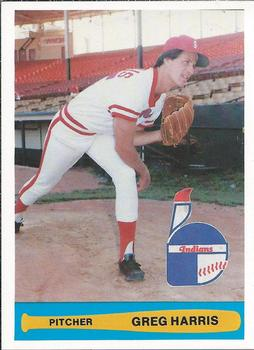
Greg A. Harris

No pitcher in the American League or National League is known to have switch pitched in a game in the 20th century until Greg A. Harris of the Montreal Expos in 1995. Harris, a natural right-hander, said in 1986 that he was capable of pitching with either arm in a game. He did not throw left handed in a regular season game until September 28, 1995, the penultimate game of his career. Pitching for Montreal against the Cincinnati Reds in the ninth inning, Harris retired Reggie Sanders pitching right handed, then switched to his left hand for the next two left-handed batters, Hal Morris and Eddie Taubensee. Harris walked Morris but got Taubensee to ground out. Harris then went back to his right hand to retire Bret Boone with another groundout to end the inning.

Jamie Irving was primarily a right-handed pitcher for the Johnstown Steal of the independent Frontier League from 1995 to 1998, but occasionally threw left handed. He had switch pitched for Harvard, where he started back-to-back games, first as a righty then as a lefty, and served as his own reliever as a lefty after starting a game as a right-handed pitcher. He switch pitched in high school, though he had elbow surgery his sophomore season, limiting him to being a lefty.

==== 21st century ====
Pat Venditte pitched with both arms in the major leagues from 2015 to 2020. He was drafted by the New York Yankees in 2008 and pitched for six different MLB teams as a reliever, appearing in 61 games with a 4.73 earned run average (ERA).

Jurrangelo Cijntje was drafted by the Seattle Mariners in the first round of the 2024 MLB draft. He pitched in High-A, Double-A, and the All-Star Futures Game in 2025. He threw primarily right handed, throwing left handed to some left-handed batters. In 2026, the Mariners classified him as solely a right-handed pitcher.

=== Amateur baseball ===
Newspaper articles in 1947 noted that freshman Roy Gibbons (Note: His name also appears as Roy Gibbens in some sources.) of Texas A&M was a switch pitcher. Gibbons was later ruled ineligible as a college player, because he had played in a professional minor league. Baseball Reference indicates Gibbons played for the Tucson Cowboys, but detail is lacking. (Note: Baseball-Reference.com has pages for both "Roy Gibbons" and "Roy Gibbens", as having played for Tucson in 1940 and 1941, respectively.) There is no record of Gibbons pitching ambidextrously for Tucson.

Ángel Macías was a Mexican switch pitcher who, exclusively as a right hander, threw a perfect game in the 1957 Little League World Series championship game, the only known perfect game in the youth tournament. His team from Monterrey later met President Dwight Eisenhower. Macías was a position player in the Los Angeles Angels farm system in 1962 and 1963 and then played in the Mexican League for 12 years.

Brandon Berdoll switch pitched for Temple Junior College in Texas. He could throw fastballs between 85 and 90 miles per hour (137 and 145 km/h) as well as curveballs with each arm. Atlanta drafted Berdoll in the 27th round of the 2003 MLB draft, but he never played professionally. He gave up baseball due to injuries and went on to operate a sawmill.

Matt Brunnig was a switch pitcher for Harvard beginning in 2003. He could throw 90 mph (140 km/h) right-handed and 85 mph (137 km/h) left-handed. As a freshman, he started from the right side and pitched some relief as a lefty. He only pitched with both arms in the same game a few times. When playing in the outfield between pitching appearances, he would typically throw with the other arm to rest the arm he just pitched with. He only pitched right-handed as a senior in 2006.

Venditte pitched for Creighton, pitching only right-handed during his freshman season of 2005. He then began switch pitching during his sophomore season of 2006.

Ryan Perez of Judson University played collegiate summer baseball with the Hyannis Harbor Hawks of the Cape Cod Baseball League in 2014. Perez won the league's all-star game MVP award after pitching from both sides. Cleveland drafted Perez in the 12th round of the 2015 MLB draft. He pitched professionally in the New York–Penn League in 2015 and 2016, then in the Mexican League in 2018, apparently pitching only left-handed.

Anthony Seigler, drafted 23rd overall by the New York Yankees in the 2018 MLB draft, was both a switch pitcher and switch hitter in high school. Professionally, he is a position player who made his MLB debut with the Milwaukee Brewers in 2025. As a catcher and infielder, Seigler throws with his right hand, but in the outfield, he throws with his left hand.

Cijntje pitched for Mississippi State in 2023 and 2024, pitching with both his right and left hands. In 2024, he was a second-team All-American. He was also a switch pitcher and switch hitter in high school in Florida and for Curaçao in the 2016 Little League World Series.

== Training methods ==
Switch pitchers are often taught to throw ambidextrously at a young age. For instance, Venditte's father trained him in ambidextrous throwing from the age of three, Brunnig's father taught him from age five, Cijntje began training when he was six, and Berdoll started practicing throwing with both arms at age 10.

Mizuno makes a special six-fingered glove for switch pitchers. Harris used one in his 1995 game, and the company made gloves for Venditte from the age of seven. Cijntje used a special glove made by Wilson.

Major league right-handed pitcher Yu Darvish throws with his left hand when training to keep both arms strong and balanced, but he has not pitched left-handed in a game. Other pitchers, including McLish, Tug McGraw, Dave Ferriss, and coach Larry Rothschild reportedly practiced pitching with their off hand.

== Switch pitchers and switch hitters ==
There have been several instances of switch pitchers pitching to switch hitters, which can result in delay or confusion as both players may try to gain an advantage. Hitters traditionally feel they have an advantage by batting from the opposite side of the plate from the pitcher's throwing arm (e.g. batting left-handed when facing a right-handed pitcher), and pitchers traditionally feel they have an advantage by throwing with the same arm as the batter hits from (e.g. throwing right-handed to a right-handed batter).

In a minor-league game in the Western Association on July 23, 1928, shortstop Paul Richards was called in to pitch for the Muskogee Chiefs against the Topeka Jayhawks. Richards pitched both right-handed and left-handed, including facing a switch hitter, Charlie Wilson. This briefly resulted in the pitcher and batter switching hands and batter's boxes, respectively, several times until Richards broke the stalemate by alternating hands with each pitch, regardless of where Wilson positioned himself. Wilson walked.

In 2008, Venditte, pitching for the Staten Island Yankees, faced switch hitter Ralph Henriquez of the Brooklyn Cyclones. When Venditte switched his modified glove to his left hand in order to pitch right-handed, Henriquez switched to batting left-handed. A series of changes continued for several minutes, until the umpires and managers conferred and decided to allow only one change of side by each player during the at bat. Henriquez struck out, batting right-handed as Venditte pitched as a righty. This incident prompted the Professional Baseball Umpires Corp. to issue a new rule about switch-pitching, which MLB later adopted. Switch pitchers must indicate which hand they will use to pitch, "by wearing his glove on his non-throwing hand and placing his foot on the pitching rubber." The pitcher must continue using this hand for the duration of the at bat, with exceptions allowed in the event of injury or the use of a pinch hitter. After the pitcher makes his choice, the batter can then select which side of the plate to bat from. This rule, Rule 5.07(f) is colloquially known as the "Pat Venditte Rule." The Korean Baseball Organization adopted a similar rule in 2015.

== See also ==
- Mikey Gow, a football quarterback who can pass the ball with either arm
- Switch hitter
