= James Troesh =

American actor

- Born: November 12, 1956; Whittier, California, US
- Died: October 1, 2011 (aged 54); Burbank, California, US
- Occupations: Actor; Screenwriter; Disability advocate
- Notable work: Highway to Heaven

James Troesh, also known as Jim Troesh (November 12, 1956 – October 1, 2011), was an actor, screenwriter and entertainment industry disability advocate.

== Career ==
He was a writer and actor for the TV series Highway to Heaven (1984–89). Other TV appearances include Airwolf, Boston Legal, and the TV movie Rise and Walk: The Dennis Byrd Story. He was one of few quadriplegic actors to be successful in the entertainment industry and the first quadriplegic actor to ever join the Screen Actors Guild.

== Personal life ==
He was paralyzed at the age of 14 following an accident at his home, which rendered him quadriplegic for the remainder of his life. He died from respiratory failure in 2011.
