= Scott Mersereau =

American football player (born 1965)

No. 94
- Positions: Defensive tackle, defensive end

Personal information
- Born: April 8, 1965 (age 61); Riverhead, New York, U.S.
- Listed height: 6 ft 4 in (1.93 m)
- Listed weight: 275 lb (125 kg)

Career information
- High school: Riverhead
- College: Southern Connecticut State
- NFL draft: 1987: 5th round, 136th overall pick

Career history
- Los Angeles Rams (1987)*; New York Jets (1987–1993); Green Bay Packers (1994)*
- * Offseason or practice squad member only

Career NFL statistics
- Sacks: 19
- Interceptions: 3
- Fumble recoveries: 3
- Stats at Pro Football Reference

Scott Robert Mersereau (born April 8, 1965) is an American former professional football player who was a defensive lineman for the New York Jets of the National Football League (NFL). He played college football for the Southern Connecticut Owls. He played for the Jets for seven seasons, beginning in 1987. He was selected by the Los Angeles Rams in the fifth round of the 1987 NFL draft.

Mersereau is most known for a collision with teammate, the late Dennis Byrd, in which Byrd was paralyzed from a neck injury during an NFL game against the Kansas City Chiefs on November 29, 1992. During the play, Byrd rushed in an attempt to sack Chiefs quarterback Dave Krieg, but Krieg stepped up to avoid the tackle, and Byrd collided with Mersereau. Byrd ducked his head at the last moment before he collided with Mersereau's chest. The head-first collision resulted in a broken C-5 vertebra that left Byrd paralyzed. Byrd later recovered, but didn't play football again. Byrd died in October, 2016, in a traffic-related accident.

Mersereau initially thought he only had a sprained ankle, and played through the remainder of the 1992 season and all of the 1993 season. However, he required regular painkiller injections through the 1993 season due to severe back pain, and was released by the Jets after that season. When he tried to sign on with the Green Bay Packers, he failed the team physical, with the team doctor telling him he had three cracked vertebrae in his lower back. Mersereau believes he suffered his back injury in the collision with Byrd.

Mersereau suffered from excruciating back pain for several years, and had two unsuccessful operations on his back. A 1996 spinal fusion was finally successful, though not until after an extended recovery that left him bedridden for six months. He has since married and currently works as a financial advisor. Additionally, Mersereau has four children and coaches football at Boca Raton Community High School in his spare time.

On February 18, 2017, Mersereau was charged in Boca Raton, Florida with child cruelty after allegedly grabbing, pushing and twice punching a 15-year-old boy. Mersereau, who was reported as being intoxicated at the time, was upset the exterior of his South Florida home had been egged, and believed the teen was responsible. Mersereau was reportedly released on $3,000 bail.
