= 2003 Indianapolis Colts season =

51st season in franchise history

- Owner: Jim Irsay
- General manager: Bill Polian
- Head coach: Tony Dungy
- Home stadium: RCA Dome

Results
- Record: 12–4
- Division place: 1st AFC South
- Playoffs: Won Wild Card Playoffs (vs. Broncos) 41–10; Won Divisional Playoffs (at Chiefs) 38–31; Lost AFC Championship (at Patriots) 14–24
- Pro Bowlers: QB Peyton Manning; WR Marvin Harrison; DE Dwight Freeney; K Mike Vanderjagt

Uniform
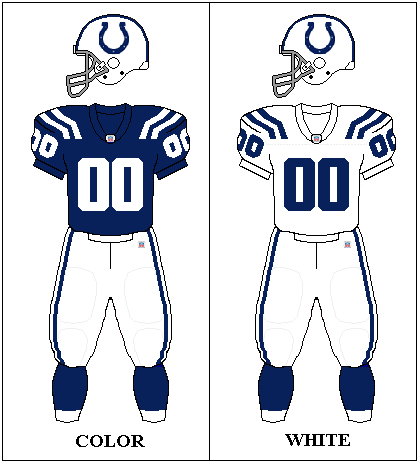

The 2003 Indianapolis Colts season was the 51st season for the team in the National Football League (NFL) and 20th in Indianapolis. The Colts improved on their 10–6 record from 2002, going 12–4 and reaching the postseason for the second straight season. After the season, quarterback Peyton Manning was named league MVP along with Steve McNair of the division rival Tennessee Titans.

After defeating the Denver Broncos and the Kansas City Chiefs in the first two rounds, the Colts advanced to their first AFC Championship Game in eight years, losing to the eventual Super Bowl champion New England Patriots in the first of five playoff meetings between Tom Brady and Peyton Manning. This was the final season that the team wore blue facemasks on their helmets.

== Offseason ==
Additions	Subtractions
WR Brandon Stokley (Ravens)	LB Mike Peterson (Jaguars)
DT Montae Reagor (Broncos)	DT James Cannida (Redskins)
LB Jim Nelson (Vikings)	DE Chukie Nwokorie (Packers)
	FB Jim Finn (Giants)

=== NFL draft ===
2003 Indianapolis Colts draft
Round	Pick	Player	Position	College	Notes
1	24	Dallas Clark *	Tight end	Iowa	
2	58	Mike Doss	Safety	Ohio State	
3	90	Donald Strickland	Cornerback	Colorado	
4	122	Steve Sciullo	Guard	Marshall	
5	138	Robert Mathis *	Defensive end	Alabama A&M	from Houston
5	162	Keyon Whiteside	Linebacker	Tennessee	
6	198	Cato June *	Linebacker	Michigan	
6	208	Makoa Freitas	Tackle	Arizona	
Made roster * Made at least one Pro Bowl during career

=== Undrafted free agents ===
2003 undrafted free agents of note
Player	Position	College
Tom Arth	Quarterback	John Carroll
Gary Brackett	Linebacker	Rutgers
Anthony Floyd	Safety	Louisville
Tom Lopienski	Fullback	Notre Dame
Aaron Moorehead	Wide Receiver	Illinois
Jason Stewart	Defensive tackle	Fresno State

== Roster ==
Indianapolis Colts 2003 final roster
Quarterbacks: 11 Brock Huard; 18 Peyton Manning; 16 Cory Sauter; Running backs: 32 Edgerrin James; 36 Tom Lopienski FB; 33 Dominic Rhodes KR; 35 Ricky Williams; Wide receivers: 11 JaJuan Dawson; 88 Marvin Harrison; 85 Aaron Moorehead; 83 Brandon Stokley; 86 Troy Walters KR/PR; 87 Reggie Wayne; 10 Terrence Wilkins KR/PR; Tight ends: 44 Dallas Clark; 80 Joe Dean Davenport; 49 Pete Mitchell; 81 Marcus Pollard	Offensive linemen: 64 Rick DeMulling G; 71 Ryan Diem T; 76 Makoa Freitas T; 78 Tarik Glenn T; 56 Tupe Peko G/C; 63 Jeff Saturday C; 74 Steve Sciullo G; Defensive linemen: 92 Chad Bratzke DE; 79 Raheem Brock DE; 93 Dwight Freeney DE; 98 Robert Mathis DE; 90 Montae Reagor DT; 99 Brad Scioli DE/DT; 75 Larry Tripplett DT; 96 Josh Williams DT	Linebackers: 58 Gary Brackett MLB; 59 Cato June OLB; 94 Rob Morris MLB; 57 Jim Nelson OLB; 50 David Thornton OLB; 53 Marcus Washington OLB; 52 Keyon Whiteside OLB; Defensive backs: 28 Idrees Bashir FS; 41 Cory Bird SS; 31 Clifton Crosby CB; 34 Jason Doering FS; 20 Mike Doss SS; 39 Anthony Floyd FS; 25 Nick Harper CB; 21 Walt Harris CB; 27 David Macklin CB; 30 Donald Strickland FS/SS; Special teams: 17 Hunter Smith P; 48 Justin Snow LS; 13 Mike Vanderjagt K	Reserve lists: 6 Tom Arth QB (NF-Inj.); 29 Joseph Jefferson CB/S (IR); 73 Adam Meadows T (IR); 23 James Mungro RB (IR); 95 David Pugh DT (NF-Inj.); 84 Brad Pyatt WR (IR); 42 Detron Smith FB (IR); 54 Donnel Thompson LB (IR); 26 Waine Bacon CB (IR); 37 Willie Miles CB (IR); Practice squad: 43 Brian Allen RB; 60 Joe Iorio C; 69 Jim Newton T; 62 Rex Richards T; rookies in italics 53 active, 10 inactive, 4 practice squad

== Regular season ==
=== Schedule ===
Week	Date	Opponent	Result	Record	Venue
1	September 7	at Cleveland Browns	**W** 9–6	1–0	Cleveland Browns Stadium
2	September 14	**Tennessee Titans**	**W** 33–7	2–0	RCA Dome
3	September 21	**Jacksonville Jaguars**	**W** 23–13	3–0	RCA Dome
4	September 28	at New Orleans Saints	**W** 55–21	4–0	Louisiana Superdome
5	October 6	at Tampa Bay Buccaneers	**W** 38–35 (OT)	5–0	Raymond James Stadium
6	October 12	Carolina Panthers	**L** 20–23 (OT)	5–1	RCA Dome
7	Bye				
8	October 26	**Houston Texans**	**W** 30–21	6–1	RCA Dome
9	November 2	at Miami Dolphins	**W** 23–17	7–1	Pro Player Stadium
10	November 9	at **Jacksonville Jaguars**	**L** 23–28	7–2	Alltel Stadium
11	November 16	New York Jets	**W** 38–31	8–2	RCA Dome
12	November 23	at Buffalo Bills	**W** 17–14	9–2	Ralph Wilson Stadium
13	November 30	New England Patriots	**L** 34–38	9–3	RCA Dome
14	December 7	at **Tennessee Titans**	**W** 29–27	10–3	The Coliseum
15	December 14	Atlanta Falcons	**W** 38–7	11–3	RCA Dome
16	December 21	Denver Broncos	**L** 17–31	11–4	RCA Dome
17	December 28	at **Houston Texans**	**W** 20–17	12–4	Reliant Stadium

Note: Division opponents in bold text.

=== Standings ===
AFC South
	W	L	T	PCT	DIV	CONF	PF	PA	STK
^{(3)} Indianapolis Colts	12	4	0	.750	5–1	9–3	447	336	W1
^{(5)} Tennessee Titans	12	4	0	.750	4–2	8–4	435	324	W3
Jacksonville Jaguars	5	11	0	.313	2–4	3–9	276	331	L1
Houston Texans	5	11	0	.313	1–5	3–9	255	380	L4

=== Game summaries ===
==== Week 1: at Cleveland Browns ====
Week 1: Indianapolis Colts at Cleveland Browns

Quarter	1	2	3	4	Total
**Colts**	0	3	3	3	**9**
Browns	3	0	0	3	**6**

at Cleveland Browns Stadium, Cleveland, Ohio

- Game time: 1:00 p.m. EDT
- Game weather: 73 °F (23 °C), Sunny
- Game attendance: 73,358
- Referee: Walt Anderson
- TV announcers (CBS): Kevin Harlan and Randy Cross
- Recap, Game Book

Game information

**First quarter**

- CLE – Phil Dawson 19-yard field goal, 0:53. Browns 3–0. **Drive: 12 plays, 76 yards, 8:12.**

**Second quarter**

- IND – Mike Vanderjagt 22-yard field goal, 0:00. Tied 3–3. **Drive: 6 plays, 6 yards, 0:29.**

**Third quarter**

- IND – Mike Vanderjagt 46-yard field goal, 3:43. Colts 6–3. **Drive: 11 plays, 52 yards, 6:02.**

**Fourth quarter**

- CLE – Phil Dawson 20-yard field goal, 8:44. Tied 6–6. **Drive: 18 plays, 86 yards, 9:59.**
- IND – Mike Vanderjagt 45-yard field goal, 0:00. Colts 9–6. **Drive: 11 plays, 65 yards, 2:39.**

Top passers

- IND – Peyton Manning – 27/43, 211 yards, 2 INT
- CLE – Kelly Holcomb – 20/29, 182 yards, 2 INT

Top rushers

- IND – Edgerrin James – 15 rushes, 67 yards
- CLE – William Green – 21 rushes, 86 yards

Top receivers

- IND – Marvin Harrison – 9 receptions, 44 yards
- CLE – Dennis Northcutt – 5 receptions, 57 yards

The Colts had high expectations leading into the 2003 season, and hoped to start the season on the right track after a humiliating loss the New York Jets in the 2002 AFC Divisional Playoffs. Peyton Manning struggled for most of the game, throwing two interceptions in the first half. Kelly Holcomb and the Cleveland Browns suffered from similar problems, however, as Holcomb twice drove the Browns inside of the Indianapolis ten yard line, but failed to score a touchdown on either drive. With the game tied 6–6 in the fourth quarter, Manning flawlessly drove the Colts from their own 8 yard line to the Cleveland 25, the highlight of the drive being a 15-yard connection to wide receiver Reggie Wayne on a 3rd and 10 situation. With six seconds left, coach Tony Dungy called timeout and sent in kicker Mike Vanderjagt to attempt the game-winning field goal, which he connected on. This kick was Vanderjagt's first game winner since being labeled as an idiot kicker by Manning in the offseason after charging that Manning needed to show more emotion in games.

==== Week 2: vs. Tennessee Titans ====
Week 2: Tennessee Titans at Indianapolis Colts

Quarter	1	2	3	4	Total
Titans	0	7	0	0	**7**
**Colts**	3	14	3	13	**33**

at RCA Dome, Indianapolis, Indiana

- Game time: 1:00 p.m. EDT
- Game weather: Game played indoors (Domed stadium)
- Game attendance: 56,999
- Referee: Jeff Triplette
- TV announcers (CBS): Ian Eagle and Solomon Wilcots
- Recap, Game Book

Game information

**First quarter**

- IND – Mike Vanderjagt 29-yard field goal, 6:06. Colts 3–0. **Drive: 12 plays, 73 yards, 6:17.**

**Second quarter**

- TEN – Tyrone Calico 7-yard pass from Steve McNair (Gary Anderson kick), 8:47. Titans 7–3. **Drive: 9 plays, 38 yards, 6:02.**
- IND – Edgerrin James 2-yard run (Mike Vanderjagt kick), 6:14. Colts 10–7. **Drive: 4 plays, 57 yards, 2:33.**
- IND – Marvin Harrison 35-yard pass from Peyton Manning (Mike Vanderjagt kick), 0:56. Colts 17–7. **Drive: 5 plays, 81 yards, 1:25.**

**Third quarter**

- IND – Mike Vanderjagt 41-yard field goal, 7:42. Colts 20–7. **Drive: 4 plays, 3 yards, 0:59.**

**Fourth quarter**

- IND – Mike Vanderjagt 23-yard field goal, 9:26. Colts 23–7. **Drive: 14 plays, 57 yards, 7:05.**
- IND – Mike Vanderjagt 48-yard field goal, 6:52. Colts 26–7. **Drive: 4 plays, -6 yards, 2:12.**
- IND – Nick Harper 75-yard interception return (Mike Vanderjagt kick), 0:22. Colts 33–7.

Top passers

- TEN – Steve McNair – 15/24, 138 yards, TD
- IND – Peyton Manning – 14/21, 173 yards, TD

Top rushers

- TEN – Eddie George – 15 rushes, 46 yards
- IND – Edgerrin James – 30 rushes, 120 yards, TD

Top receivers

- TEN – Derrick Mason – 10 receptions, 98 yards
- IND – Marvin Harrison – 3 receptions, 59 yards, TD

==== Week 3: vs. Jacksonville Jaguars ====
Week 3: Jacksonville Jaguars at Indianapolis Colts

Quarter	1	2	3	4	Total
Jaguars	0	3	0	10	**13**
**Colts**	0	0	17	6	**23**

at RCA Dome, Indianapolis, Indiana

- Game time: 1:00 p.m. EDT
- Game weather: Game played indoors (Domed stadium)
- Game attendance: 55,770
- Referee: Bernie Kukar
- TV announcers (CBS): Don Criqui and Steve Tasker
- Recap, Game Book

Game information

**First quarter**

- No scoring plays

**Second quarter**

- JAX – Seth Marler 49-yard field goal, 10:11. Jaguars 3–0. **Drive: 6 plays, 17 yards, 2:08.**

**Third quarter**

- IND – Reggie Wayne 28-yard pass from Peyton Manning (Mike Vanderjagt kick), 10:02. Colts 7–3. **Drive: 9 plays, 66 yards, 4:58.**
- IND – Reggie Wayne 4-yard pass from Peyton Manning (Mike Vanderjagt kick), 5:22. Colts 14–3. **Drive: 7 plays, 52 yards, 3:11.**
- IND – Mike Vanderjagt 46-yard field goal, 3:37. Colts 17–3. **Drive: 4 plays, 6 yards, 1:33.**

**Fourth quarter**

- IND – Mike Vanderjagt 36-yard field goal, 10:17. Colts 20–3. **Drive: 7 plays, 23 yards, 3:29.**
- JAX – Seth Marler 37-yard field goal, 8:57. Colts 20–6. **Drive: 5 plays, 40 yards, 1:20.**
- IND – Mike Vanderjagt 29-yard field goal, 2:29. Colts 23–6. **Drive: 10 plays, 51 yards, 6:28.**
- JAX – Matthew Hatchette 8-yard pass from Byron Leftwich (Seth Marler kick), 1:02. Colts 23–13. **Drive: 5 plays, 32 yards, 1:27.**

Top passers

- JAX – Mark Brunell – 12/23, 90 yards
- IND – Peyton Manning – 21/33, 216 yards, 2 TD, INT

Top rushers

- JAX – Fred Taylor – 17 rushes, 126 yards
- IND – Edgerrin James – 27 rushes, 76 yards

Top receivers

- JAX – Matthew Hatchette – 4 receptions, 45 yards, TD
- IND – Reggie Wayne – 10 receptions, 141 yards, 2 TD

After being down 3–0 at halftime, the Colts scored 17 third quarter points followed by six points in the fourth quarter to beat Jacksonville 23-13 and improve to 3–0. A standout moment from the game occurred when Colts' rookie DB Mike Doss caused a fumble by Jaguars' RB Fred Taylor. Doss reportedly quipped, "Hey, Fred, you forgot something." In retaliation, Taylor told reporters ahead of their next encounter, "I'm going to bust his (butt). I'm going to punish him."

==== Week 4: at New Orleans Saints ====
Week 4: Indianapolis Colts at New Orleans Saints

Quarter	1	2	3	4	Total
**Colts**	14	10	24	7	**55**
Saints	0	10	3	8	**21**

at Louisiana Superdome, New Orleans, Louisiana

- Game time: 8:30 p.m. EDT/7:30 p.m. CDT
- Game weather: Game played indoors (Domed stadium)
- Game attendance: 70,020
- Referee: Bill Leavy
- TV announcers (ESPN): Mike Patrick, Joe Theismann, Paul Maguire and Suzy Kolber
- Recap, Game Book

Game information

**First quarter**

- IND – Ricky Williams 17-yard pass from Peyton Manning (Mike Vanderjagt kick), 12:35. Colts 7–0. **Drive: 3 plays, 23 yards, 1:33.**
- IND – Marvin Harrison 14-yard pass from Peyton Manning (Mike Vanderjagt kick), 6:34. Colts 14–0. **Drive: 8 plays, 61 yards, 4:24.**

**Second quarter**

- IND – Marvin Harrison 79-yard pass from Peyton Manning (Mike Vanderjagt kick), 9:51. Colts 21–0. **Drive: 1 play, 79 yards, 0:14.**
- NO – John Carney 38-yard field goal, 6:04. Colts 21–3. **Drive: 9 plays, 43 yards, 3:47.**
- IND – Mike Vanderjagt 41-yard field goal, 3:12. Colts 24–3. **Drive: 5 plays, 25 yards, 2:52.**
- NO – Deuce McAllister 1-yard run (John Carney kick), 0:42. Colts 24–10. **Drive: 8 plays, 71 yards, 2:30.**

**Third quarter**

- IND – Mike Vanderjagt 42-yard field goal, 9:27. Colts 27–10. **Drive: 10 plays, 53 yards, 5:33.**
- IND – Dominic Rhodes 12-yard pass from Peyton Manning (Mike Vanderjagt kick), 8:24. Colts 34–10. **Drive: 2 plays, 12 yards, 0:48.**
- NO – John Carney 43-yard field goal, 5:11. Colts 34–13. **Drive: 9 plays, 65 yards, 3:13.**
- IND – Marvin Harrison 32-yard pass from Peyton Manning (Mike Vanderjagt kick), 1:38. Colts 41–13. **Drive: 7 plays, 72 yards, 3:33.**
- IND – Dallas Clark 11-yard pass from Peyton Manning (Mike Vanderjagt kick), 0:04. Colts 48–13. **Drive: 3 plays, 18 yards, 0:55.**

**Fourth quarter**

- IND – Dwight Freeney 19-yard fumble return (Mike Vanderjagt kick), 14:19. Colts 55–13.
- NO – Jerome Pathon 11-yard pass from Todd Bouman (Todd Bouman–James Fenderson pass), 9:31. Colts 55–21. **Drive: 9 plays, 79 yards, 4:48.**

Top passers

- IND – Peyton Manning – 20/25, 314 yards, 6 TD
- NO – Aaron Brooks – 16/28, 166 yards, 2 INT

Top rushers

- IND – Ricky Williams – 9 rushes, 34 yards
- NO – Deuce McAllister – 17 rushes, 101 yards, TD

Top receivers

- IND – Marvin Harrison – 6 receptions, 158 yards, 3 TD
- NO – Ernie Conwell – 6 receptions, 88 yards

The Colts offense was nearly flawless as Peyton Manning and Marvin Harrison hooked up six times for 158 yards and three touchdowns. Harrison accounted for half of Manning's 308 passing yards while Ricky Williams, Marcus Pollard, and Dallas Clark threw in good receiving days as well. The Colts rushing attack was not as strong without Edgerrin James but Indianapolis still picked up 101 yards on the ground.

==== Week 5: at Tampa Bay Buccaneers ====
Week 5: Indianapolis Colts at Tampa Bay Buccaneers

Quarter	1	2	3	4	OT	Total
**Colts**	0	0	7	28	3	**38**
Buccaneers	14	7	7	7	0	**35**

at Raymond James Stadium, Tampa, Florida

- Game time: 9:00 p.m. EDT
- Game weather: 82 °F (28 °C), Partly cloudy, isolated showers
- Game attendance: 65,647
- Referee: Johnny Grier
- TV announcers (ABC): Al Michaels, John Madden and Lisa Guerrero
- Recap, Game Book

Game information

**First quarter**

- TB – Keenan McCardell 74-yard pass from Brad Johnson (Martin Gramatica kick), 9:52. Buccaneers 7–0. **Drive: 1 play, 74 yards, 0:14.**
- TB – Keenan McCardell 57-yard fumble return (Martin Gramatica kick), 4:55. Buccaneers 14–0

**Second quarter**

- TB – Reggie Barlow 3-yard pass from Brad Johnson (Martin Gramatica kick), 10:16. Buccaneers 21–0. **Drive: 11 plays, 71 yards, 6:21.**

**Third quarter**

- IND – Marvin Harrison 37-yard pass from Peyton Manning (Mike Vanderjagt kick), 13:05. Buccaneers 21–7. **Drive: 5 plays, 73 yards, 1:55.**
- TB – Keenan McCardell 15-yard pass from Brad Johnson (Martin Gramatica kick), 1:14. Buccaneers 28–7. **Drive: 12 plays, 85 yards, 7:28.**

**Fourth quarter**

- IND – Ricky Williams 1-yard run (Mike Vanderjagt kick), 12:01. Buccaneers 28–14. **Drive: 8 plays, 75 yards, 4:13.**
- TB – Ronde Barber 29-yard interception return (Martin Gramatica kick), 5:09. Buccaneers 35–14
- IND – James Mungro 3-yard run (Mike Vanderjagt kick), 3:37. Buccaneers 35–21. **Drive: 4 plays, 12 yards, 1:32.**
- IND – Marvin Harrison 28-yard pass from Peyton Manning (Mike Vanderjagt kick), 2:29. Buccaneers 35–28. **Drive: 6 plays, 58 yards, 1:08.**
- IND – Ricky Williams 1-yard run (Mike Vanderjagt kick), 0:35. Tied 35–35. **Drive: 5 plays, 85 yards, 1:06.**

**Overtime**

- IND – Mike Vanderjagt 29-yard field goal, 3:47. Colts 38–35. **Drive: 15 plays, 76 yards, 6:46.**

Top passers

- IND – Peyton Manning – 34/47, 386 yards, 2 TD, INT
- TB – Brad Johnson – 26/39, 318 yards, 3 TD, INT

Top rushers

- IND – Ricky Williams – 13 rushes, 56 yards, TD
- TB – Michael Pittman – 16 rushes, 106 yards

Top receivers

- IND – Marvin Harrison – 11 receptions, 176 yards, 2 TD
- TB – Keenan McCardell – 4 receptions, 106 yards, 2 TD

In Tampa on Monday Night, the Bucs scored 21 unanswered points and held a 35–14 lead with 5:09 remaining. The game began to change hands when Brad Pyatt returned the ensuing kickoff 90 yards. James Mungro scored a short touchdown, the Colts recovered an onside kick, and Peyton Manning threw a touchdown to Marvin Harrison to cut the lead to a touchdown. With 35 seconds left, Ricky Williams scored a touchdown from 3 yards out to tie the game. With four minutes to go in overtime, Mike Vanderjagt missed a potential game-winning 40-yard field goal wide right, but it was called back by a rare leaping penalty when Bucs DE Simeon Rice landed on his own player. Vanderjagt's ensuing 29 yard attempt was blocked, but kept going and bounced off the right upright and through the posts.

==== Week 6: vs. Carolina Panthers ====
Week 6: Carolina Panthers at Indianapolis Colts

Quarter	1	2	3	4	OT	Total
**Panthers**	3	0	14	3	3	**23**
Colts	0	13	0	7	0	**20**

at RCA Dome, Indianapolis, Indiana

- Game time: 1:00 p.m. EDT
- Game weather: Game played indoors (Domed stadium)
- Game attendance: 57,082
- Referee: Larry Nemmers
- TV announcers (Fox): Ron Pitts and Tim Ryan
- Recap, Game Book

Game information

**First quarter**

- CAR – John Kasay 29-yard field goal, 2:32. Panthers 3–0. **Drive: 7 plays, 47 yards, 4:17.**

**Second quarter**

- IND – James Mungro 1-yard run (Mike Vanderjagt kick), 13:33. Colts 7–3. **Drive: 8 plays, 81 yards, 3:59.**
- IND – Mike Vanderjagt 39-yard field goal, 8:19. Colts 10–3. **Drive: 6 plays, 15 yards, 2:31.**
- IND – Mike Vanderjagt 22-yard field goal, 0:15. Colts 13–3. **Drive: 12 plays, 76 yards, 6:10.**

**Third quarter**

- CAR – Stephen Davis 28-yard run (John Kasay kick), 13:59. Colts 13–10. **Drive: 1 play, 28 yards, 0:08.**
- CAR – Steve Smith 52-yard pass from Jake Delhomme (John Kasay kick), 10:22. Panthers 17–13. **Drive: 5 plays, 85 yards, 2:17.**

**Fourth quarter**

- CAR – John Kasay 23-yard field goal, 11:17. Panthers 20–13. **Drive: 5 plays, 21 yards, 2:48.**
- IND – Reggie Wayne 25-yard pass from Peyton Manning (Mike Vanderjagt kick), 0:45. Tied 20–20. **Drive: 9 plays, 91 yards, 2:23.**

**Overtime**

- CAR – John Kasay 47-yard field goal, 9:21. Panthers 23–20. **Drive: 10 plays, 43 yards, 5:39.**

Top passers

- CAR – Jake Delhomme – 12/20, 181 yards, TD, INT
- IND – Peyton Manning – 23/34, 293 yards, TD, INT

Top rushers

- CAR – DeShaun Foster – 16 rushes, 85 yards
- IND – Ricky Williams – 17 rushes, 57 yards

Top receivers

- CAR – Steve Smith – 6 receptions, 103 yards, TD
- IND – Marvin Harrison – 8 receptions, 119 yards

==== Week 8: vs. Houston Texans ====
Week 8: Houston Texans at Indianapolis Colts

Quarter	1	2	3	4	Total
Texans	0	14	0	7	**21**
**Colts**	3	14	10	3	**30**

at RCA Dome, Indianapolis, Indiana

- Game time: 4:15 p.m. EST
- Game weather: Game played indoors (Domed stadium)
- Game attendance: 56,132
- Referee: Walt Coleman
- TV announcers (CBS): Gus Johnson and Brent Jones
- Recap, Game Book

Game information

**First quarter**

- IND – Mike Vanderjagt 31-yard field goal, 0:44. Colts 3–0. **Drive: 10 plays, 71 yards, 6:28.**

**Second quarter**

- HOU – Domanick Davis 15-yard run (Kris Brown kick), 11:14. Texans 7–3. **Drive: 2 plays, 28 yards, 0:37.**
- HOU – Billy Miller 1-yard pass from David Carr (Kris Brown kick), 4:55. Texans 14–3. **Drive: 8 plays, 79 yards, 4:39.**
- IND – Marcus Pollard 1-yard pass from Peyton Manning (Mike Vanderjagt kick), 1:54. Texans 14–10. **Drive: 7 plays, 69 yards, 3:01.**
- IND – Reggie Wayne 2-yard pass from Peyton Manning (Mike Vanderjagt kick), 0:15. Colts 17–14. **Drive: 4 plays, 23 yards, 0:42.**

**Third quarter**

- IND – Reggie Wayne 57-yard pass from Peyton Manning (Mike Vanderjagt kick), 14:03. Colts 24–14. **Drive: 2 plays, 68 yards, 0:57.**
- IND – Mike Vanderjagt 29-yard field goal, 4:34. Colts 27–14. **Drive: 12 plays, 81 yards, 5:41.**

**Fourth quarter**

- HOU – Domanick Davis 2-yard run (Kris Brown kick), 12:31. Colts 27–21. **Drive: 12 plays, 66 yards, 7:03.**
- IND – Mike Vanderjagt 22-yard field goal, 5:16. Colts 30–21. **Drive: 13 plays, 67 yards, 7:15.**

Top passers

- HOU – Tony Banks – 12/17, 88 yards, INT
- IND – Peyton Manning – 22/30, 269 yards, 3 TD

Top rushers

- HOU – Domanick Davis – 25 rushes, 109 yards, 2 TD
- IND – Edgerrin James – 23 rushes, 104 yards

Top receivers

- HOU – Jabar Gaffney – 4 receptions, 58 yards
- IND – Reggie Wayne – 6 receptions, 96 yards, 2 TD

==== Week 9: at Miami Dolphins ====
Week 9: Indianapolis Colts at Miami Dolphins

Quarter	1	2	3	4	Total
**Colts**	0	9	7	7	**23**
Dolphins	7	0	7	3	**17**

at Pro Player Stadium, Miami Gardens, Florida

- Game time: 1:00 p.m. EST
- Game weather: 82 °F (28 °C), Partly Sunny
- Game attendance: 73,258
- Referee: Tom White
- TV announcers (CBS): Greg Gumbel, Phil Simms and Armen Keteyian
- Recap, Game Book

Game information

**First quarter**

- MIA – Ricky Williams 3-yard run (Olindo Mare kick), 0:41. Dolphins 7–0. **Drive: 4 plays, 53 yards, 2:06.**

**Second quarter**

- IND – Mike Vanderjagt 50-yard field goal, 11:11. Dolphins 7–3. **Drive: 5 plays, 14 yards, 2:08.**
- IND – Mike Vanderjagt 44-yard field goal, 2:20. Dolphins 7–6. **Drive: 14 plays, 65 yards, 6:45.**
- IND – Mike Vanderjagt 25-yard field goal, 0:00. Colts 9–7. **Drive: 6 plays, 72 yards, 1:35.**

**Third quarter**

- IND – Edgerrin James 1-yard run (Mike Vanderjagt kick), 9:18. Colts 16–7. **Drive: 11 plays, 74 yards, 5:42.**
- MIA – Chris Chambers 28-yard pass from Brian Griese (Olindo Mare kick), 7:27. Colts 16–14. **Drive: 4 plays, 69 yards, 1:51.**

**Fourth quarter**

- IND – Troy Walters 3-yard pass from Peyton Manning (Mike Vanderjagt kick), 9:40. Colts 23–14. **Drive: 13 plays, 91 yards, 8:18.**
- MIA – Olindo Mare 23-yard field goal, 3:10. Colts 23–17. **Drive: 8 plays, 50 yards, 2:52.**

Top passers

- IND – Peyton Manning – 23/37, 266 yards, TD, INT
- MIA – Brian Griese – 18/29, 231 yards, TD

Top rushers

- IND – Edgerrin James – 26 rushes, 89 yards, TD
- MIA – Ricky Williams – 13 rushes, 36 yards, TD

Top receivers

- IND – Marvin Harrison – 6 receptions, 60 yards
- MIA – Randy McMichael – 6 receptions, 88 yards

==== Week 10: at Jacksonville Jaguars ====
Week 10: Indianapolis Colts at Jacksonville Jaguars

Quarter	1	2	3	4	Total
Colts	7	13	0	3	**23**
**Jaguars**	7	0	7	14	**28**

at Alltel Stadium, Jacksonville, Florida

- Game time: 1:00 p.m. EST
- Game weather: 62 °F (17 °C)
- Game attendance: 45,037
- Referee: Ron Winter
- TV announcers (CBS): Ian Eagle and Solomon Wilcots
- Recap, Game Book

Game information

**First quarter**

- IND – Marvin Harrison 30-yard pass from Peyton Manning (Mike Vanderjagt kick), 10:07. Colts 7–0. **Drive: 7 plays, 52 yards, 2:31.**
- JAX – Fred Taylor 5-yard run (Seth Marler kick), 1:19. Tied 7–7. **Drive: 7 plays, 43 yards, 4:06.**

**Second quarter**

- IND – Mike Vanderjagt 27-yard field goal, 11:08. Colts 10–7. **Drive: 13 plays, 61 yards, 5:11.**
- IND – Mike Vanderjagt 26-yard field goal, 6:51. Colts 13–7. **Drive: 6 plays, 57 yards, 2:22.**
- IND – Marcus Pollard 13-yard pass from Peyton Manning (Mike Vanderjagt kick), 0:28. Colts 20–7. **Drive: 11 plays, 62 yards, 4:21.**

**Third quarter**

- JAX – Byron Leftwich 4-yard run (Seth Marler kick), 8:26. Colts 20–14. **Drive: 13 plays, 80 yards, 6:34.**

**Fourth quarter**

- JAX – Jimmy Smith 43-yard pass from Byron Leftwich (Seth Marler kick), 11:32. Jaguars 21–20. **Drive: 7 plays, 93 yards, 3:59.**
- IND – Mike Vanderjagt 27-yard field goal, 9:44. Colts 23–20. **Drive: 5 plays, 70 yards, 1:48.**
- JAX – Fred Taylor 32-yard run (Seth Marler kick), 1:08. Jaguars 28–23. **Drive: 2 plays, 31 yards, 0:20.**

Top passers

- IND – Peyton Manning – 28/45, 347 yards, 2 TD, 2 INT
- JAX – Byron Leftwich – 12/22, 179 yards, TD

Top rushers

- IND – Edgerrin James – 15 rushes, 44 yards
- JAX – Fred Taylor – 28 rushes, 152 yards, 2 TD

Top receivers

- IND – Marcus Pollard – 3 receptions, 92 yards, TD
- JAX – Jimmy Smith – 4 receptions, 87 yards, TD

By the start of the fourth quarter, the Jaguars rallied with two touchdowns to take the lead. On the next possession, Peyton Manning connected with Marcus Pollard, who raced 70 yards to set up a go–ahead field goal. The Jaguars then moved deep into Colts' territory, but a fumbled field goal snap by punter/holder Mark Royals thwarted their efforts. After the Colts went three–and–out and a strong punt return set Jacksonville up at the Indianapolis 31–yard line, Fred Taylor made a 32–yard run, evading Mike Doss as he fell, to score a touchdown and put the Jaguars ahead with just a minute remaining. Manning's attempt to respond ended in an interception, sealing the Jaguars' first–ever victory over the Colts in a surprising upset. After the game, Doss remarked, "I guess you'd have to say he got the final word today." Taylor expressed that his frustration arose from Doss forcing his head to the ground after he recovered the fumble, expressing "I felt he truly disrespected me,"

==== Week 11: vs. New York Jets ====
Week 11: New York Jets at Indianapolis Colts

Quarter	1	2	3	4	Total
Jets	7	3	21	0	**31**
**Colts**	10	14	14	0	**38**

at RCA Dome, Indianapolis, Indiana

- Game time: 4:05 p.m. EST
- Game weather: Game played indoors (Domed stadium)
- Game attendance: 56,801
- Referee: Pete Morelli
- TV announcers (CBS): Greg Gumbel, Phil Simms and Armen Keteyian
- Recap, Game Book

Game information

**First quarter**

- IND – Mike Vanderjagt 31-yard field goal, 9:34. Colts 3–0. **Drive: 11 plays, 53 yards, 5:26.**
- NYJ – Jonathan Carter 62-yard pass from Chad Pennington (Doug Brien kick), 7:20. Jets 7–3. **Drive: 4 plays, 73 yards, 2:14.**
- IND – Troy Walters 46-yard pass from Peyton Manning (Mike Vanderjagt kick), 3:56. Colts 10–7. **Drive: 6 plays, 76 yards, 3:24.**

**Second quarter**

- IND – Edgerrin James 1-yard run (Mike Vanderjagt kick), 6:41. Colts 17–7. **Drive: 8 plays, 54 yards, 4:30.**
- NYJ – Doug Brien 43-yard field goal, 1:55. Colts 17–10. **Drive: 8 plays, 47 yards, 4:46.**
- IND – Edgerrin James 4-yard run (Mike Vanderjagt kick), 0:07. Colts 24–10. **Drive: 7 plays, 67 yards, 1:48.**

**Third quarter**

- NYJ – Curtis Conway 28-yard pass from Chad Pennington (Doug Brien kick), 13:41. Colts 24–17. **Drive: 2 plays, 46 yards, 1:19.**
- IND – Edgerrin James 1-yard run (Mike Vanderjagt kick), 10:18. Colts 31–17. **Drive: 6 plays, 46 yards, 3:23.**
- NYJ – Jonathan Carter 90-yard kickoff return (Doug Brien kick), 10:05 . Colts 31–24. **Drive: 0 plays, 0 yards, 0:13.**
- NYJ – Santana Moss 48-yard pass from Chad Pennington (Doug Brien kick), 6:50. Tied 31–31. **Drive: 3 plays, 89 yards, 1:25.**
- IND – Hunter Smith 21-yard run (Mike Vanderjagt kick), 3:12. Colts 38–31. **Drive: 7 plays, 78 yards, 3:38.**

**Fourth quarter**

- No scoring plays

Top passers

- NYJ – Chad Pennington – 11/14, 219 yards, 3 TD
- IND – Peyton Manning – 26/37, 401 yards, TD

Top rushers

- NYJ – Curtis Martin – 13 rushes, 105 yards
- IND – Edgerrin James – 36 rushes, 127 yards, 3 TD

Top receivers

- NYJ – Santana Moss – 3 receptions, 67 yards, TD
- IND – Reggie Wayne – 9 receptions, 141 yards

==== Week 12: at Buffalo Bills ====
Week 12: Indianapolis Colts at Buffalo Bills

Quarter	1	2	3	4	Total
**Colts**	0	3	0	14	**17**
Bills	0	7	0	7	**14**

at Ralph Wilson Stadium, Orchard Park, New York

- Game time: 1:00 p.m. EST
- Game weather: 70 °F (21 °C), Mostly Sunny
- Game attendance: 73,004
- Referee: Bernie Kukar
- TV announcers (CBS): Dick Enberg, Dan Dierdorf and Bonnie Bernstein
- Recap, Game Book

Game information

**First quarter**

- No scoring plays

**Second quarter**

- IND – Mike Vanderjagt 24-yard field goal, 8:42. Colts 3–0. **Drive: 12 plays, 49 yards, 4:26.**
- BUF – Drew Bledsoe 1-yard run (Rian Lindell kick), 2:07. Bills 7–3. **Drive: 13 plays, 66 yards, 6:35.**

**Third quarter**

- No scoring plays

**Fourth quarter**

- BUF – Sammy Morris 7-yard run (Rian Lindell kick), 14:51. Bills 14–3. **Drive: 8 plays, 60 yards, 3:35.**
- IND – Edgerrin James 14-yard run (run failed), 10:40. Bills 14–9. **Drive: 9 plays, 61 yards, 4:11.**
- IND – Edgerrin James 1-yard run (Peyton Manning–James Mungro pass), 1:38. Colts 17–14. **Drive: 16 plays, 83 yards, 6:00.**

Top passers

- IND – Peyton Manning – 26/42, 229 yards
- BUF – Drew Bledsoe – 15/28, 135 yards, INT

Top rushers

- IND – Edgerrin James – 28 rushes, 108 yards, 2 TD
- BUF – Travis Henry – 22 rushes, 77 yards

Top receivers

- IND – Aaron Moorehead – 5 receptions, 71 yards
- BUF – Eric Moulds – 3 receptions, 38 yards

==== Week 13: vs. New England Patriots ====
Week 13: New England Patriots at Indianapolis Colts

Quarter	1	2	3	4	Total
**Patriots**	10	14	7	7	**38**
Colts	0	10	14	10	**34**

at RCA Dome, Indianapolis, Indiana

- Game time: 1:00 p.m. EST
- Game weather: Game played indoors (Domed stadium)
- Game attendance: 57,102
- Referee: Bill Leavy
- TV announcers (CBS): Greg Gumbel, Phil Simms, and Armen Keteyian
- Recap, Game Book

Game information

**First quarter**

- NE – Adam Vinatieri 43-yard field goal, 9:04. Patriots 3–0. **Drive: 11 plays, 50 yards, 5:56.**
- NE – Mike Cloud 4-yard run (Adam Vinatieri kick), 2:32. Patriots 10–0. **Drive: 6 plays, 36 yards, 2:32.**

**Second quarter**

- NE – Dedric Ward 31-yard pass from Tom Brady (Adam Vinatieri kick), 11:54. Patriots 17–0. **Drive: 9 plays, 73 yards, 4:03.**
- IND – Mike Vanderjagt 40-yard field goal, 7:04. Patriots 17–3. **Drive: 10 plays, 53 yards, 4:50.**
- IND – Marcus Pollard 8-yard pass from Peyton Manning (Mike Vanderjagt kick), 0:12. Patriots 17–10. **Drive: 11 plays, 86 yards, 3:20.**
- NE – Bethel Johnson 92-yard kickoff return (Adam Vinatieri kick), 0:00. Patriots 24–10. **Drive: 0 plays, 0 yards, 0:12.**

**Third quarter**

- NE – Mike Cloud 1-yard run (Adam Vinatieri kick), 7:36. Patriots 31–10. **Drive: 11 plays, 61 yards, 5:33.**
- IND – Reggie Wayne 13-yard pass from Peyton Manning (Mike Vanderjagt kick), 1:20. Patriots 31–17. **Drive: 9 plays, 44 yards, 4:04.**
- IND – Marvin Harrison 26-yard pass from Peyton Manning (Mike Vanderjagt kick), 0:14. Patriots 31–24. **Drive: 1 play, 26 yards, 0:06.**

**Fourth quarter**

- IND – Troy Walters 6-yard pass from Peyton Manning (Mike Vanderjagt kick), 10:21. Tied 31–31. **Drive: 9 play, 69 yards, 3:47.**
- NE – Deion Branch 13-yard pass from Tom Brady (Adam Vinatieri kick), 8:36. Patriots 38–31. **Drive: 4 plays, 31 yards, 1:45.**
- IND – Mike Vanderjagt 29-yard field goal, 3:27. Patriots 38–34. **Drive: 4 plays, 0 yards, 0:18.**

Top passers

- NE – Tom Brady – 26/35, 236 yards, 2 TD, 2 INT
- IND – Peyton Manning – 29/48, 278 yards, 4 TD, INT

Top rushers

- NE – Kevin Faulk – 15 rushes, 42 yards
- IND – Edgerrin James – 25 rushes, 88 yards

Top receivers

- NE – Deion Branch – 6 receptions, 64 yards, TD
- IND – Marvin Harrison – 7 receptions, 88 yards, TD

The Colts hosted the Patriots in the first meeting between the two clubs since October 2001 and the first meeting since divisional realignment took the Colts out of the AFC East into the AFC South. With both teams at 9–2 it was the latest in a season in which two teams with no more than two losses had ever met. The Patriots opened up with a flurry; an Adam Vinatieri field goal was followed by the sacking of Peyton Manning and a fumble recovery, followed by a Mike Cloud rushing score. Dedric Ward then caught a 31-yard Tom Brady touchdown throw for a 17–0 Patriots lead. Peyton Manning led two scoring drives that left the score 17–10 New England with 12 seconds in the first half, but on the ensuing kick to end the half Bethel Johnson ran the ball back for a 92-yard touchdown.

The Patriots increased their lead to 31–10 on another Cloud rushing score, but the tide turned decisively as Brady threw two picks late in the third quarter; Manning completed a 13-yard touchdown to Reggie Wayne on fourth down, then found Marvin Harrison for a 23-yard score. A six-yard Troy Walters touchdown catch in the fourth tied the game at 31, then Bethel Johnson had another huge kickoff return, setting up a 13-yard Brady to Deion Branch touchdown. Kevin Faulk was then steamrolled in the Pats' redzone and fumbled the ball, leading to a 29-yard Mike Vanderjagt kick and a 38–34 Patriots lead. The Patriots were forced to punt in the final minutes and Ken Walter laid a huge egg as his punt landed at the 50. The Colts drove to the Patriots 2-yard line entering the final minute and Patriots linebacker Willie McGinest suffered a momentary leg injury that necessitated stopping the clock. On first down Edgerrin James was stopped at the 1; on second he was stopped and Manning called the Colts' final timeout; on third he threw to the left side of the endzone but the ball sailed over everyone's heads; finally on fourth with 15 seconds remaining James was stopped at the 1 by McGinest, Ted Washington, and Rodney Harrison. The 38–34 thriller left the Patriots shaken ("I've never seen anything like it," Rodney Harrison said afterward) and left them 10–2 and the Colts 9–3.

==== Week 14: at Tennessee Titans ====
Week 14: Indianapolis Colts at Tennessee Titans

Quarter	1	2	3	4	Total
**Colts**	3	9	17	0	**29**
Titans	10	0	3	14	**27**

at The Coliseum, Nashville, Tennessee

- Game time: 1:00 p.m. EST/12:00 p.m. CST
- Game weather: 42 °F (6 °C), Sunny and Cold
- Game attendance: 68,809
- Referee: Terry McAulay
- TV announcers (CBS): Dick Enberg, Dan Dierdorf and Bonnie Bernstein
- Recap, Game Book

Game information

**First quarter**

- TEN – Gary Anderson 40-yard field goal, 10:25. Titans 3–0. **Drive: 9 plays, 44 yards, 4:35.**
- IND – Mike Vanderjagt 21-yard field goal, 6:46. Tied 3–3. **Drive: 9 plays, 52 yards, 3:39.**
- TEN – Steve McNair 2-yard run (Gary Anderson kick), 1:47. Titans 10–3. **Drive: 9 plays, 80 yards, 4:59.**

**Second quarter**

- IND – Mike Vanderjagt 35-yard field goal, 8:56. Titans 10–6. **Drive: 9 plays, 26 yards, 3:25.**
- IND – Mike Vanderjagt 36-yard field goal, 1:48. Titans 10–9. **Drive: 12 plays, 67 yards, 5:29.**
- IND – Mike Vanderjagt 23-yard field goal, 0:02. Colts 12–10. **Drive: 9 plays, 24 yards, 1:37.**

**Third quarter**

- IND – Edgerrin James 2-yard run (Mike Vanderjagt kick), 9:33. Colts 19–10. **Drive: 9 plays, 54 yards, 5:27.**
- IND – Mike Vanderjagt 26-yard field goal, 7:16. Colts 22–10. **Drive: 4 plays, 7 yards, 2:08.**
- TEN – Gary Anderson 40-yard field goal, 2:40. Colts 22–13. **Drive: 11 plays, 54 yards, 4:36.**
- IND – Edgerrin James 5-yard run (Mike Vanderjagt kick), 0:37. Colts 29–13. **Drive: 4 plays, 68 yards, 2:03.**

**Fourth quarter**

- TEN – Robert Holcombe 1-yard pass from Steve McNair (Steve McNair run), 9:24. Colts 29–21. **Drive: 12 plays, 69 yards, 6:13.**
- TEN – Derrick Mason 2-yard pass from Steve McNair (pass failed), 1:52. Colts 29–27. **Drive: 7 plays, 48 yards, 0:48.**

Top passers

- IND – Peyton Manning – 22/34, 228 yards
- TEN – Steve McNair – 22/38, 235 yards, 2 TD

Top rushers

- IND – Edgerrin James – 28 rushes, 97 yards, 2 TD
- TEN – Eddie George – 11 rushes, 51 yards

Top receivers

- IND – Marvin Harrison – 10 receptions, 124 yards
- TEN – Derrick Mason – 6 receptions, 64 yards, TD

==== Week 15: vs. Atlanta Falcons ====
Week 15: Atlanta Falcons at Indianapolis Colts

Quarter	1	2	3	4	Total
Falcons	0	0	7	0	**7**
**Colts**	14	10	14	0	**38**

at RCA Dome, Indianapolis, Indiana

- Game time: 1:00 p.m. EST
- Game weather: Game played indoors (Domed stadium)
- Game attendance: 57,103
- Referee: Johnny Grier
- TV announcers (Fox): Kenny Albert and Brian Baldinger
- Recap, Game Book

Game information

**First quarter**

- IND – Reggie Wayne 14-yard pass from Peyton Manning (Mike Vanderjagt kick), 13:22. Colts 7–0. **Drive: 1 play, 14 yards, 0:05.**
- IND – Brandon Stokley 4-yard pass from Peyton Manning (Mike Vanderjagt kick), 1:45. Colts 14–0. **Drive: 7 plays, 49 yards, 4:08.**

**Second quarter**

- IND – Mike Vanderjagt 43-yard field goal, 10:09. Colts 17–0. **Drive: 8 plays, 59 yards, 3:41.**
- IND – Marvin Harrison 17-yard pass from Peyton Manning (Mike Vanderjagt kick), 2:40. Colts 24–0. **Drive: 7 plays, 80 yards, 3:10.**

**Third quarter**

- IND – Brandon Stokley 37-yard pass from Peyton Manning (Mike Vanderjagt kick), 12:51. Colts 31–0. **Drive: 5 plays, 60 yards, 2:09.**
- ATL – T. J. Duckett 17-yard run (Jay Feely kick), 4:57. Colts 31–7. **Drive: 6 plays, 41 yards, 1:58.**
- IND – Marvin Harrison 16-yard pass from Peyton Manning (Mike Vanderjagt kick), 2:35. Colts 38–7. **Drive: 5 plays, 80 yards, 2:22.**

**Fourth quarter**

- No scoring plays

Top passers

- ATL – Michael Vick – 6/19, 47 yards, INT
- IND – Peyton Manning – 25/30, 290 yards, 5 TD

Top rushers

- ATL – T. J. Duckett – 18 rushes, 74 yards, TD
- IND – Edgerrin James – 20 rushes, 126 yards

Top receivers

- ATL – Brian Finneran – 3 receptions, 38 yards
- IND – Marvin Harrison – 7 receptions, 117 yards, 2 TD

==== Week 16: vs. Denver Broncos ====
Week 16: Denver Broncos at Indianapolis Colts

Quarter	1	2	3	4	Total
**Broncos**	14	14	0	3	**31**
Colts	7	10	0	0	**17**

at RCA Dome, Indianapolis, Indiana

- Game time: 8:30 p.m. EST
- Game weather: Game played indoors (Domed stadium)
- Game attendance: 57,149
- Referee: Jeff Triplette
- TV announcers (ESPN): Mike Patrick, Joe Theismann, Paul Maguire and Suzy Kolber
- Recap, Game Book

Game information

**First quarter**

- IND – Gary Brackett 31-yard interception return (Mike Vanderjagt kick), 12:59. Colts 7–0.
- DEN – Mike Anderson 2-yard run (Jason Elam kick), 9:55. Tied 7–7. **Drive: 6 plays, 75 yards, 3:04.**
- DEN – Jake Plummer 6-yard run (Jason Elam kick), 2:06. Broncos 14–7. **Drive: 8 plays, 57 yards, 5:44.**

**Second quarter**

- IND – Edgerrin James 16-yard run (Mike Vanderjagt kick), 14:10. Tied 14–14. **Drive: 6 plays, 57 yards, 2:56.**
- DEN – Jake Plummer 1-yard run (Jason Elam kick), 6:20. Broncos 21–14. **Drive: 12 plays, 81 yards, 7:50.**
- DEN – Rod Smith 15-yard pass from Jake Plummer (Jason Elam kick), 1:11. Broncos 28–14. **Drive: 7 plays, 67 yards, 3:58.**
- IND – Mike Vanderjagt 40-yard field goal, 0:04. Broncos 28–17. **Drive: 7 plays, 45 yards, 1:07.**

**Third quarter**

- No scoring plays

**Fourth quarter**

- DEN – Jason Elam 24-yard field goal, 4:26. Broncos 31–17. **Drive: 15 plays, 82 yards, 9:34.**

Top passers

- DEN – Jake Plummer – 14/17, 238 yards, TD, INT
- IND – Peyton Manning – 12/23, 146 yards

Top rushers

- DEN – Quentin Griffin – 28 rushes, 136 yards
- IND – Edgerrin James – 10 rushes, 42 yards, TD

Top receivers

- DEN – Ashley Lelie – 5 receptions, 115 yards
- IND – Marvin Harrison – 6 receptions, 85 yards

==== Week 17: at Houston Texans ====
Week 17: Indianapolis Colts at Houston Texans

Quarter	1	2	3	4	Total
**Colts**	0	3	0	17	**20**
Texans	0	10	7	0	**17**

at Reliant Stadium, Houston, Texas

- Game time: 1:00 p.m. EST/12:00 p.m. CST
- Game weather: Game played indoors (Retractable roof closed)
- Game attendance: 70,680
- Referee: Ed Hochuli
- TV announcers (CBS): Ian Eagle, Solomon Wilcots and Marcus Allen
- Recap, Game Book

Game information

**First quarter**

- No scoring plays

**Second quarter**

- IND – Mike Vanderjagt 39-yard field goal, 10:51. Colts 3–0. **Drive: 11 plays, 54 yards, 5:04.**
- HOU – Domanick Davis 11-yard run (Kris Brown kick), 5:23. Texans 7–3. **Drive: 8 plays, 68 yards, 5:28.**
- HOU – Kris Brown 36-yard field goal, 1:49. Texans 10–3. **Drive: 4 plays, 1 yard, 1:33.**

**Third quarter**

- HOU – Domanick Davis 13-yard run (Kris Brown kick), 10:34. Texans 17–3. **Drive: 8 plays, 63 yards, 4:26.**

**Fourth quarter**

- IND – Edgerrin James 6-yard run (Mike Vanderjagt kick), 14:57. Texans 17–10. **Drive: 11 plays, 67 yards, 5:36.**
- IND – Brandon Stokley 5-yard pass from Peyton Manning (Mike Vanderjagt kick), 3:50. Tied 17–17. **Drive: 1 play, 5 yards, 0:05.**
- IND – Mike Vanderjagt 43-yard field goal, 0:00. Colts 20–17. **Drive: 12 plays, 65 yards, 2:40.**

Top passers

- IND – Peyton Manning – 26/38, 220 yards, TD, INT
- HOU – David Carr – 13/23, 105 yards, INT

Top rushers

- IND – Edgerrin James – 27 rushes, 171 yards, TD
- HOU – Domanick Davis – 20 rushes, 99 yards, 2 TD

Top receivers

- IND – Brandon Stokley – 9 receptions, 67 yards, TD
- HOU – Andre Johnson – 5 receptions, 51 yards

== Postseason ==
Round	Date	Opponent (seed)	Result	Record	Venue	Recap
Wild Card	January 4	Denver Broncos (6)	W 41–10	1–0	RCA Dome	Recap
Divisional	January 11	at Kansas City Chiefs (2)	W 38–31	2–0	Arrowhead Stadium	Recap
AFC Championship	January 18	at New England Patriots (1)	L 14–24	2–1	Gillette Stadium	Recap

=== Game summaries ===
==== AFC Wild Card: vs. Denver Broncos ====
AFC Wild Card Playoffs: (6) Denver Broncos at (3) Indianapolis Colts

Quarter	1	2	3	4	Total
Broncos	3	0	0	7	10
Colts	14	17	10	0	41

at RCA Dome, Indianapolis, Indiana

- Game time: 4:30 p.m. EST
- Game weather: Indoors (dome)
- Game attendance: 56,586
- Referee: Johnny Grier
- TV announcers (CBS): Greg Gumbel, Phil Simms and Armen Keteyian
- Recap, Game Book

Game information

First quarter

- IND – Brandon Stokley 31-yard pass from Peyton Manning (Mike Vanderjagt kick), 11:55. Colts 7–0. Drive: 6 plays, 70 yards, 3:05.
- DEN – Jason Elam 49-yard field goal, 3:41. Colts 7–3. Drive: 12 plays, 47 yards, 8:14.
- IND – Marvin Harrison 46-yard pass from Peyton Manning (Mike Vanderjagt kick), 0:24. Colts 14–3. Drive: 8 plays, 81 yards, 3:17.

Second quarter

- IND – Marvin Harrison 23-yard pass from Peyton Manning (Mike Vanderjagt kick), 7:28. Colts 21–3. Drive: 8 plays, 80 yards, 3:49.
- IND – Brandon Stokley 87-yard pass from Peyton Manning (Mike Vanderjagt kick), 1:51. Colts 28–3. Drive: 1 play, 87 yards, 0:10.
- IND – Mike Vanderjagt 27-yard field goal, 0:00. Colts 31–3. Drive: 6 plays, 49 yards, 0:55.

Third quarter

- IND – Reggie Wayne 7-yard pass from Peyton Manning (Mike Vanderjagt kick), 5:19. Colts 38–3. Drive: 12 plays, 64 yards, 5:45.
- IND – Mike Vanderjagt 20-yard field goal, 0:55. Colts 41–3. Drive: 6 plays, 17 yards, 3:38.

Fourth quarter

- DEN – Rod Smith 7-yard pass from Jake Plummer (Jason Elam kick), 7:04. Colts 41–10. Drive: 12 plays, 62 yards, 6:18.

Top passers

- DEN – Jake Plummer – 20/33, 181 yards, TD, 2 INT
- IND – Peyton Manning – 22/26, 377 yards, 5 TD

Top rushers

- DEN – Clinton Portis – 17 rushes, 68 yards
- IND – Edgerrin James – 17 rushes, 78 yards

Top receivers

- DEN – Rod Smith – 5 receptions, 66 yards, TD
- IND – Brandon Stokley – 4 receptions, 144 yards, 2 TD

==== AFC Divisional Playoff: at Kansas City Chiefs ====
AFC Divisional Playoffs: (3) Indianapolis Colts at (2) Kansas City Chiefs

Quarter	1	2	3	4	Total
Colts	14	7	10	7	38
Chiefs	3	7	14	7	31

at Arrowhead Stadium, Kansas City, Missouri

- Game time: 1:00 p.m. EST/12:00 p.m. CST
- Game weather: 51 °F (11 °C), clear
- Game attendance: 79,159
- Referee: Gerald Austin
- TV announcers (CBS): Dick Enberg, Dan Dierdorf and Bonnie Bernstein
- Recap, Game Book

Game information

First quarter

- IND – Brandon Stokley 29-yard pass from Peyton Manning (Mike Vanderjagt kick), 9:20. Colts 7–0. Drive: 10 plays, 70 yards, 5:40.
- KC – Morten Andersen 22-yard field goal, 3:38. Colts 7–3. Drive: 11 plays, 73 yards, 5:42.
- IND – Edgerrin James 11-yard run (Mike Vanderjagt kick), 0:37. Colts 14–3. Drive: 6 plays, 76 yards, 3:01.

Second quarter

- KC – Dante Hall 9-yard pass from Trent Green (Morten Andersen kick), 8:35. Colts 14–10. Drive: 12 plays, 77 yards, 7:02.
- IND – Tom Lopienski 2-yard pass from Peyton Manning (Mike Vanderjagt kick), 4:29. Colts 21–10. Drive: 9 plays, 71 yards, 4:06.

Third quarter

- IND – Mike Vanderjagt 45-yard field goal, 9:24. Colts 24–10. Drive: 11 plays, 51 yards, 5:08.
- KC – Priest Holmes 1-yard run (Morten Andersen kick), 5:26. Colts 24–17. Drive: 8 plays, 55 yards, 3:58.
- IND – Reggie Wayne 19-yard pass from Peyton Manning (Mike Vanderjagt kick), 1:48. Colts 31–17. Drive: 7 plays, 64 yards, 3:38.
- KC – Dante Hall 92-yard kickoff return (Morten Andersen kick), 1:35. Colts 31–24. Drive: 0 plays, 0 yards, 0:13.

Fourth quarter

- IND – Edgerrin James 1-yard run (Mike Vanderjagt kick), 11:14. Colts 38–24. Drive: 10 plays, 81 yards, 5:21.
- KC – Priest Holmes 1-yard run (Morten Andersen kick), 4:22. Colts 38–31. Drive: 17 plays, 76 yards, 6:52.

Top passers

- IND – Peyton Manning – 22/30, 304 yards, 3 TD
- KC – Trent Green – 18/30, 212 yards, TD

Top rushers

- IND – Edgerrin James – 26 rushes, 125 yards, 2 TD
- KC – Priest Holmes – 24 rushes, 176 yards, 2 TD

Top receivers

- IND – Marvin Harrison – 6 receptions, 98 yards
- KC – Tony Gonzalez – 4 receptions, 55 yards

This offensive shootout became the second game without a punt in NFL history, and first since the Buffalo Bills played the San Francisco 49ers in 1992. Colts quarterback Peyton Manning threw for 304 yards and three touchdowns, while Edgerrin James ran for a career postseason high 125 yards and two scores. On the Kansas City side, Dante Hall caught a touchdown and returned a kickoff for another; and Priest Holmes, who set the regular-season rushing touchdown record, rushed for 176 yards, caught 5 passes for 32 yards, and scored twice. Kansas City quarterback Trent Green threw for 212 yards and a touchdown while also rushing for 18 yards in his first career postseason game. The Chiefs defense failed to stop the Colt's offense. Kansas City's defensive coordinator Greg Robinson was asked to resign the following week.

==== AFC Championship: at New England Patriots ====
AFC Championship: (3) Indianapolis Colts at (1) New England Patriots

Quarter	1	2	3	4	Total
Colts	0	0	7	7	14
Patriots	7	8	6	3	24

at Gillette Stadium, Foxborough, Massachusetts

- Game time: 3:00 p.m. EST
- Game weather: 32 °F (0 °C), cloudy, occasional snow
- Game attendance: 68,436
- Referee: Walt Coleman
- TV announcers (CBS): Greg Gumbel, Phil Simms, Armen Keteyian and Bonnie Bernstein
- Recap, Game Book

Game information

First quarter

- NE – David Givens 7-yard pass from Tom Brady (Adam Vinatieri kick), 8:16. Patriots 7–0. Drive: 13 plays, 65 yards, 6:44.

Second quarter

- NE – Adam Vinatieri 31-yard field goal, 12:44. Patriots 10–0. Drive: 13 plays, 67 yards, 5:42.
- NE – Adam Vinatieri 25-yard field goal, 8:06. Patriots 13–0. Drive: 11 plays, 52 yards, 4:22.
- NE – Justin Snow fumble out of bounds in the end zone for a safety, 4:08. Patriots 15–0

Third quarter

- IND – Edgerrin James 2-yard run (Mike Vanderjagt kick), 9:44. Patriots 15–7. Drive: 12 plays, 52 yards, 5:16.
- NE – Adam Vinatieri 27-yard field goal, 7:20. Patriots 18–7. Drive: 6 plays, 48 yards, 2:24.
- NE – Adam Vinatieri 21-yard field goal, 1:32. Patriots 21–7. Drive: 8 plays, 66 yards, 4:45.

Fourth quarter

- IND – Marcus Pollard 7-yard pass from Peyton Manning (Mike Vanderjagt kick), 2:27. Patriots 21–14. Drive: 13 plays, 67 yards, 3:43.
- NE – Adam Vinatieri 34-yard field goal, 0:50. Patriots 24–14. Drive: 4 plays, 4 yards, 0:51.

Top passers

- IND – Peyton Manning – 23/47, 237 yards, TD, 4 INT
- NE – Tom Brady – 22/37, 237 yards, TD, INT

Top rushers

- IND – Edgerrin James – 19 rushes, 78 yards, TD
- NE – Antowain Smith – 22 rushes, 100 yards

Top receivers

- IND – Marcus Pollard – 6 receptions, 90 yards, TD
- NE – Troy Brown – 7 receptions, 88 yards

== Awards and records ==
- Peyton Manning, Bert Bell Award

== See also ==
- History of the Indianapolis Colts
- Indianapolis Colts seasons
- Colts–Patriots rivalry
