= 2004 Indianapolis Colts season =

52nd season in franchise history

- Owner: Jim Irsay
- General manager: Bill Polian
- Head coach: Tony Dungy
- Home stadium: RCA Dome

Results
- Record: 12–4
- Division place: 1st AFC South
- Playoffs: Won Wild Card Playoffs (vs. Broncos) 49–24; Lost Divisional Playoffs (at Patriots) 3–20
- Pro Bowlers: QB Peyton Manning; RB Edgerrin James; WR Marvin Harrison; OT Tarik Glenn; DE Dwight Freeney

Uniform
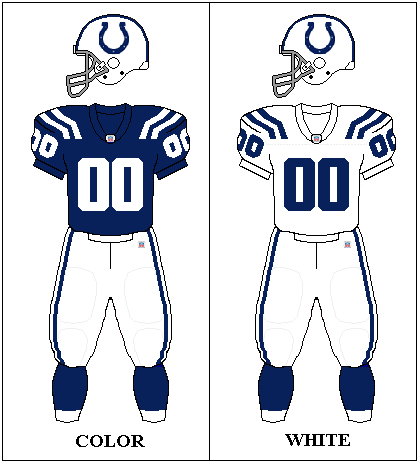

The 2004 Indianapolis Colts season was the 52nd season for the team in the National Football League (NFL) and 21st in Indianapolis. The 2004 Colts season began with the team trying to maintain or improve on their 12–4 record from 2003, and advance further into the playoffs. The Colts finished the season 12–4, and defeated the Denver Broncos for the second straight time in the playoffs, but they were halted in the Divisional round by the defending and eventual Super Bowl champion New England Patriots, their second straight loss in the playoffs to them.

Peyton Manning had one of the best seasons ever by an NFL quarterback (and the best season of his Indianapolis career), throwing 49 touchdown passes and breaking the previous record of 48 held by Dan Marino. At season's end, Peyton Manning was named the NFL MVP. For the season the Colts set an NFL record with 51 total touchdown passes. The Colts led the NFL with 522 points scored. The Colts tallied more points in the first half of each of their games of the 2004 season (277 points) than seven other NFL teams managed in the entire season.

Despite throwing 49 touchdown passes, Peyton Manning attempted fewer than 500 passes for the first time in his NFL career. Sports statistics site Football Outsiders calculates that Manning had the best-ever season by a quarterback, play-for-play, in 2004.

The 2004 Colts are the only team in NFL history to convert five or more passing touchdowns in a game four different times during the regular season.

== Offseason ==
=== Free Agency ===
During Free Agency, the Colts failed to re-sign linebacker Marcus Washington and cornerback Walt Harris. Both signed with the Washington Redskins in free agency.

=== NFL draft ===
2004 Indianapolis Colts draft
Round	Pick	Player	Position	College	Notes
2	44	Bob Sanders *	Safety	Iowa	from Pittsburgh
3	68	Ben Hartsock	Tight end	Ohio State	from Cleveland
3	69	Gilbert Gardner	Linebacker	Purdue	from Atlanta
4	107	Kendyll Pope	Linebacker	Florida State	from Pittsburgh
4	125	Jason David	Cornerback	Washington State	from Philadelphia via Atlanta
5	141	Jake Scott	Guard	Idaho	from Cleveland
6	173	Von Hutchins	Cornerback	Mississippi	from Cleveland
6	193	Jim Sorgi	Quarterback	Wisconsin	
7	229	David Kimball	Kicker	Penn State	from St Louis
Made roster * Made at least one Pro Bowl during career

=== Undrafted free agents ===
2004 undrafted free agents of note
Player	Position	College
Josh Thomas	Defensive end	Syracuse
Ben Utecht	Tight end	Minnesota

== Roster ==
Indianapolis Colts 2004 final roster
Quarterbacks: 5 Travis Brown; 18 Peyton Manning; 12 Jim Sorgi; Running backs: 32 Edgerrin James; 23 James Mungro; 33 Dominic Rhodes; Wide receivers: 88 Marvin Harrison; 85 Aaron Moorehead; 84 Brad Pyatt; 83 Brandon Stokley; 86 Troy Walters; 87 Reggie Wayne; Tight ends: 44 Dallas Clark; 80 Ben Hartsock; 81 Marcus Pollard	Offensive linemen: 64 Rick DeMulling C; 71 Ryan Diem OT; 76 Makoa Freitas OT; 78 Tarik Glenn OT; 61 Trevor Hutton G; 65 Ryan Lilja G; 56 Tupe Peko G; 63 Jeff Saturday C; 73 Jake Scott G; Defensive linemen: 79 Raheem Brock DE; 93 Dwight Freeney DE; 98 Robert Mathis DE; 90 Montae Reagor DT; 99 Brad Scioli DE; 75 Larry Tripplett DT; 96 Josh Williams DT	Linebackers: 58 Gary Brackett MLB; 51 Gilbert Gardner OLB; 59 Cato June OLB; 94 Rob Morris MLB; 55 Kendyll Pope OLB; 97 Nick Rogers OLB; 50 David Thornton OLB; Defensive backs: 26 Waine Bacon CB; 28 Idrees Bashir FS; 41 Cory Bird SS; 42 Jason David CB; 20 Mike Doss SS; 39 Anthony Floyd FS; 25 Nick Harper CB; 27 Von Hutchins CB; 29 Joseph Jefferson CB; 21 Bob Sanders SS; 38 Gerome Sapp SS; Special teams: 10 Martin Gramatica K; 17 Hunter Smith P; 48 Justin Snow LS; 13 Mike Vanderjagt K	Reserve lists: 72 Thomas Houchin DE (IR); 57 Jim Nelson LB (IR); 30 Donald Strickland CB (IR); 91 Josh Thomas DE (IR); 47 Ben Utecht TE (PUP); -- Patrick Venzke T (IR); 52 Keyon Whiteside LB (IR); Practice squad: 6 Tom Arth QB; 35 Ran Carthon RB; 49 Bryan Fletcher TE; 14 Eric Hill WR (IR); 36 Tom Lopienski FB; 53 Andre Sommersell LB; 11 John Standeford WR; 60 Jason Stewart DT; 31 Jarrell Weaver S; Rookies in italics 53 active, 8 inactive, 8 practice squad

== Preseason ==
Date	Opponent	Result	Game Site	NFL Recap
August 14, 2004	at San Diego Chargers	W 21–17	Qualcomm Stadium	Recap
August 21, 2004	New York Jets	L 7–31	RCA Dome	Recap
August 28, 2004	Buffalo Bills	W 30–17	RCA Dome	Recap
September 3, 2004	at Cincinnati Bengals	L 13–16	Paul Brown Stadium	Recap

== Regular season ==
=== Schedule ===
Week	Date	Opponent	Result	Record	Game Site	NFL Recap
1	September 9	at New England Patriots	**L** 24–27	0–1	Gillette Stadium	Recap
2	September 19	at **Tennessee Titans**	**W** 31–17	1–1	The Coliseum	Recap
3	September 26	Green Bay Packers	**W** 45–31	2–1	RCA Dome	Recap
4	October 3	at **Jacksonville Jaguars**	**W** 24–17	3–1	Alltel Stadium	Recap
5	October 10	Oakland Raiders	**W** 35–14	4–1	RCA Dome	Recap
6	Bye					
7	October 24	**Jacksonville Jaguars**	**L** 24–27	4–2	RCA Dome	Recap
8	October 31	at Kansas City Chiefs	**L** 35–45	4–3	Arrowhead Stadium	Recap
9	November 8	Minnesota Vikings	**W** 31–28	5–3	RCA Dome	Recap
10	November 14	**Houston Texans**	**W** 49–14	6–3	RCA Dome	Recap
11	November 21	at Chicago Bears	**W** 41–10	7–3	Soldier Field	Recap
12	November 25	at Detroit Lions	**W** 41–9	8–3	Ford Field	Recap
13	December 5	**Tennessee Titans**	**W** 51–24	9–3	RCA Dome	Recap
14	December 12	at **Houston Texans**	**W** 23–14	10–3	Reliant Stadium	Recap
15	December 19	Baltimore Ravens	**W** 20–10	11–3	RCA Dome	Recap
16	December 26	San Diego Chargers	**W** 34–31 (OT)	12–3	RCA Dome	Recap
17	January 2	at Denver Broncos	**L** 14–33	12–4	Invesco Field	Recap
Note: Intra-division opponents are in **bold** text.

== Standings ==
AFC South
	W	L	T	PCT	DIV	CONF	PF	PA	STK
^{(3)} Indianapolis Colts	12	4	0	.750	5–1	8–4	522	351	L1
Jacksonville Jaguars	9	7	0	.563	2–4	6–6	261	280	W1
Houston Texans	7	9	0	.438	4–2	6–6	309	339	L1
Tennessee Titans	5	11	0	.313	1–5	3–9	344	439	W1

AFC
#	Team	Division	W	L	T	PCT	DIV	CONF	SOS	SOV	STK
Division leaders
1	Pittsburgh Steelers	North	15	1	0	.938	5–1	11–1	.484	.479	W14
2	New England Patriots	East	14	2	0	.875	5–1	10–2	.492	.478	W2
3 (Note: Indianapolis clinched the AFC #3 seed instead of San Diego based upon head-to-head victory.)	Indianapolis Colts	South	12	4	0	.750	5–1	8–4	.500	.458	L1
4	San Diego Chargers	West	12	4	0	.750	5–1	9–3	.477	.411	W1
Wild cards
5 (Note: New York Jets clinched the AFC #5 seed instead of Denver based upon better record against common opponents (New York Jets were 5–0 to Denver’s 3–2 against San Diego, Cincinnati, Houston, and Miami).)	New York Jets	East	10	6	0	.625	3–3	7–5	.523	.406	L2
6	Denver Broncos	West	10	6	0	.625	3–3	7–5	.484	.450	W2
Did not qualify for the postseason
7 (Note: Jacksonville and Baltimore finished ahead of Buffalo because they each defeated Buffalo head-to-head.) (Note: Jacksonville finished ahead of Baltimore based upon better record against common opponents (Jacksonville were 3–2 against Baltimore’s 2–3 versus Pittsburgh, Indianapolis, Buffalo and Kansas City).)	Jacksonville Jaguars	South	9	7	0	.563	2–4	6–6	.527	.479	W1
8	Baltimore Ravens	North	9	7	0	.563	3–3	6–6	.551	.472	W1
9	Buffalo Bills	East	9	7	0	.563	3–3	5–7	.512	.382	L1
10	Cincinnati Bengals	North	8	8	0	.500	2–4	4–8	.543	.453	W2
11 (Note: Houston finished ahead of Kansas City based upon head-to-head victory.)	Houston Texans	South	7	9	0	.438	4–2	6–6	.504	.402	L1
12	Kansas City Chiefs	West	7	9	0	.438	3–3	6–6	.551	.509	L1
13 (Note: Oakland finished ahead of Tennessee based upon head-to-head victory.)	Oakland Raiders	West	5	11	0	.313	1–5	3–9	.570	.450	L2
14	Tennessee Titans	South	5	11	0	.313	1–5	3–9	.512	.463	W1
15 (Note: Miami finished ahead of Cleveland based upon head-to-head victory.)	Miami Dolphins	East	4	12	0	.250	1–5	2–10	.555	.438	L1
16	Cleveland Browns	North	4	12	0	.250	1–5	3–9	.590	.469	W1
Tiebreakers (Note: When breaking ties for three or more teams under the NFL's rules, they are first broken within divisions, then comparing only the highest-ranked remaining team from each division.)

== Game summaries ==
=== Week 1: at New England Patriots ===
Quarter	1	2	3	4	Total
Colts	0	17	0	7	24
Patriots	3	10	14	0	27

at Gillette Stadium, Foxborough, Massachusetts

- Game time: 9:00 pm EST/8:00 pm CST
- Game weather: 73 °F (23 °C), Cloudy, warm, and humid
- Game attendance: 68,756
- TV announcers: (ABC) Al Michaels, John Madden

=== Week 2: at Tennessee Titans ===
Quarter	1	2	3	4	Total
Colts	3	0	7	21	31
Titans	7	3	7	0	17

at The Coliseum, Nashville, Tennessee

- Game time: 1:00 pm EST/12:00 pm CST
- Game weather: 71 °F (22 °C), Sunny
- Game attendance: 68,932

=== Week 3: vs. Green Bay Packers ===
Quarter	1	2	3	4	Total
Packers	14	3	7	7	31
Colts	21	14	0	10	45

at RCA Dome, Indianapolis

- Game time: 4:15 pm EST/3:15 pm CST
- Game weather: Game played indoors
- Game attendance: 57,280
- TV announcers: Joe Buck, Troy Aikman, Pam Oliver (Sideline Reporter)

==== Week 4: at Jacksonville Jaguars ====
Week 4: Indianapolis Colts at Jacksonville Jaguars – Game summary

Quarter	1	2	3	4	Total
Colts	7	3	7	7	24
Jaguars	0	3	3	11	17

at Alltel Stadium, Jacksonville, Florida

- Date: October 3
- Game time: 1:00 p.m. EDT
- Game weather: 85°, relative humidity 62%, wind 5 mph, wind chill 0
- Game attendance: 55,770
- Referee: Walt Anderson

=== Week 5: vs. Oakland Raiders ===
Quarter	1	2	3	4	Total
Raiders	0	7	0	7	14
Colts	7	14	0	14	35

at RCA Dome, Indianapolis

- Game time: 1:00 pm EST/12:00 pm CST
- Game weather: Game played indoors
- Game attendance: 57,230

==== Week 7: vs. Jacksonville Jaguars ====
Week 7: Jacksonville Jaguars at Indianapolis Colts – Game summary

Quarter	1	2	3	4	Total
Jaguars	0	10	3	14	27
Colts	0	14	0	10	24

at RCA Dome, Indianapolis, Indiana

- Date: October 24
- Game time: 1:00 pm EST/12:00 pm CST
- Game weather: None (indoor stadium)
- Game attendance: 56,615
- Referee: Terry McAulay

A fumble by Colts' TE Dallas Clark allowed the Jaguars to capitalize with a field goal, giving them a 16–14 lead as the fourth quarter began. In response, Manning led the Colts down the field to score a field goal, reclaiming the lead. On the subsequent drive, Leftwich connected with Smith for a 25–yard touchdown and then successfully targeted WR Ernest Wilford for a two–point conversion. The Colts quickly answered back, with Manning finding Harrison for a 39–yard touchdown that leveled the score. During the Jaguars' next possession, Leftwich completed two passes of over 10 yards, advancing into Indianapolis territory. On a 3rd–and–7, Leftwich located Wilford, which positioned the Jaguars within field goal range. K Josh Scobee then successfully converted a 53–yard field goal, allowing the Jaguars to take the lead with under a minute left in the game. With no timeouts left, the Colts were unable to mount a comeback, resulting in a 27–24 victory for the Jaguars, marking their first win in Indianapolis. This win propelled them to the top of the AFC South standings. This would ultimately be the Colts' sole defeat in their RCA Dome that season.

=== Week 8: at Kansas City Chiefs ===
Quarter	1	2	3	4	Total
Colts	7	7	14	7	35
Chiefs	7	24	0	14	45

at Arrowhead Stadium, Kansas City, Missouri

- Game time: 1:00 pm EST/12:00 pm CST
- Game weather: 67 °F (19 °C), Clear
- Game attendance: 78,312

=== Week 9: vs. Minnesota Vikings ===
Quarter	1	2	3	4	Total
Vikings	0	6	8	14	28
Colts	7	7	7	10	31

at RCA Dome, Indianapolis

- Game time: 9:00 pm EST/8:00 pm CST
- Game weather: Game played indoors
- Game attendance: 57,307
- TV announcers: Al Michaels, John Madden

=== Week 10: vs. Houston Texans ===
Quarter	1	2	3	4	Total
Texans	0	0	7	7	14
Colts	7	14	21	7	49

at RCA Dome, Indianapolis

- Game time: 1:00 pm EST/12:00 pm CST
- Game weather: Game played indoors
- Game attendance: 56,511

=== Week 11: at Chicago Bears ===
Quarter	1	2	3	4	Total
Colts	7	20	14	0	41
Bears	3	0	0	7	10

at Soldier Field, Chicago

- Game time: 1:00 pm EST/12:00 pm CST
- Game weather: 43 °F (6 °C), Partly Cloudy
- Game attendance: 61,908

=== Week 12: at Detroit Lions ===
Quarter	1	2	3	4	Total
Colts	13	14	14	0	41
Lions	6	3	0	0	9

at Ford Field, Detroit

- Game time: 12:30 pm EST/11:30 pm CST
- Game weather: Game played indoors
- Game attendance: 63,107

=== Week 13: vs. Tennessee Titans ===
Quarter	1	2	3	4	Total
Titans	24	0	0	0	24
Colts	17	14	10	10	51

at RCA Dome, Indianapolis

- Game time: 1:00 pm EST/12:00 pm CST
- Game weather: Game played indoors
- Game attendance: 57,278

=== Week 14: at Houston Texans ===
Quarter	1	2	3	4	Total
Colts	14	0	3	6	23
Texans	0	7	7	0	14

at Reliant Stadium, Houston

- Game time: 1:00 pm EST/12:00 pm CST
- Game weather: 68 °F (20 °C), Clear
- Game attendance: 70,762

=== Week 15: vs. Baltimore Ravens ===
Quarter	1	2	3	4	Total
Colts	3	3	14	0	20
Ravens	3	0	7	0	10

at RCA Dome, Indianapolis

- Game time: 8:30 pm EST/7:30 pm CST
- Game weather: Game played indoors
- Game attendance: 57,240
- TV: ESPN

=== Week 16: vs. San Diego Chargers ===
Quarter	1	2	3	4	OT	Total
Chargers	7	10	7	7	0	31
Colts	0	9	7	15	3	34

at RCA Dome, Indianapolis

- Game time: 1:00 pm EST/12:00 pm CST
- Game weather: Game played indoors
- Game attendance: 57,330
- TV: CBS

=== Week 17: at Denver Broncos ===
Quarter	1	2	3	4	Total
Colts	7	7	0	0	14
Broncos	7	13	10	3	33

at Invesco Field, Denver

- Game time: 4:15 pm EST/3:15 pm CST
- Game weather: 32 °F (0 °C), Cloudy
- Game attendance: 75,149
- TV announcers: Jim Nantz, Phil Simms

== Postseason schedule ==
Playoff round	Date	Opponent (seed)	Result	Record	Host stadium	NFL recap
Wild Card	January 9	Denver Broncos (6)	W 49–24	1–0	RCA Dome	Recap
Divisional	January 16	at New England Patriots (2)	L 3–20	1–1	Gillette Stadium	Recap

== Postseason results ==
=== AFC Wild-Card Playoff Game: vs. Denver Broncos ===
Quarter	1	2	3	4	Total
Broncos	0	3	14	7	24
Colts	14	21	0	14	49

at RCA Dome, Indianapolis

- Game time: 1:00 pm EST/12:00 pm CST
- Game weather: Game played indoors
- Game attendance: 56,609
- TV: CBS

=== AFC Divisional Playoff game: at New England Patriots ===
Quarter	1	2	3	4	Total
Colts	0	3	0	0	3
Patriots	0	6	7	7	20

at Gillette Stadium, Foxborough, Massachusetts

- Game time: 4:45 pm EST/4:45 pm CST
- Game weather: 25 °F (−4 °C), Cloudy, Cold, Snow
- Game attendance: 68,756
- TV: CBS

== Awards and records ==
- Peyton Manning, Bert Bell Award

== See also ==
- History of the Indianapolis Colts
- Indianapolis Colts seasons
- Colts–Patriots rivalry
