= 2005 AFC Divisional playoff game (Pittsburgh–Indianapolis) =

Notable NFL playoff game

2005 Pittsburgh Steelers–Indianapolis Colts playoff game
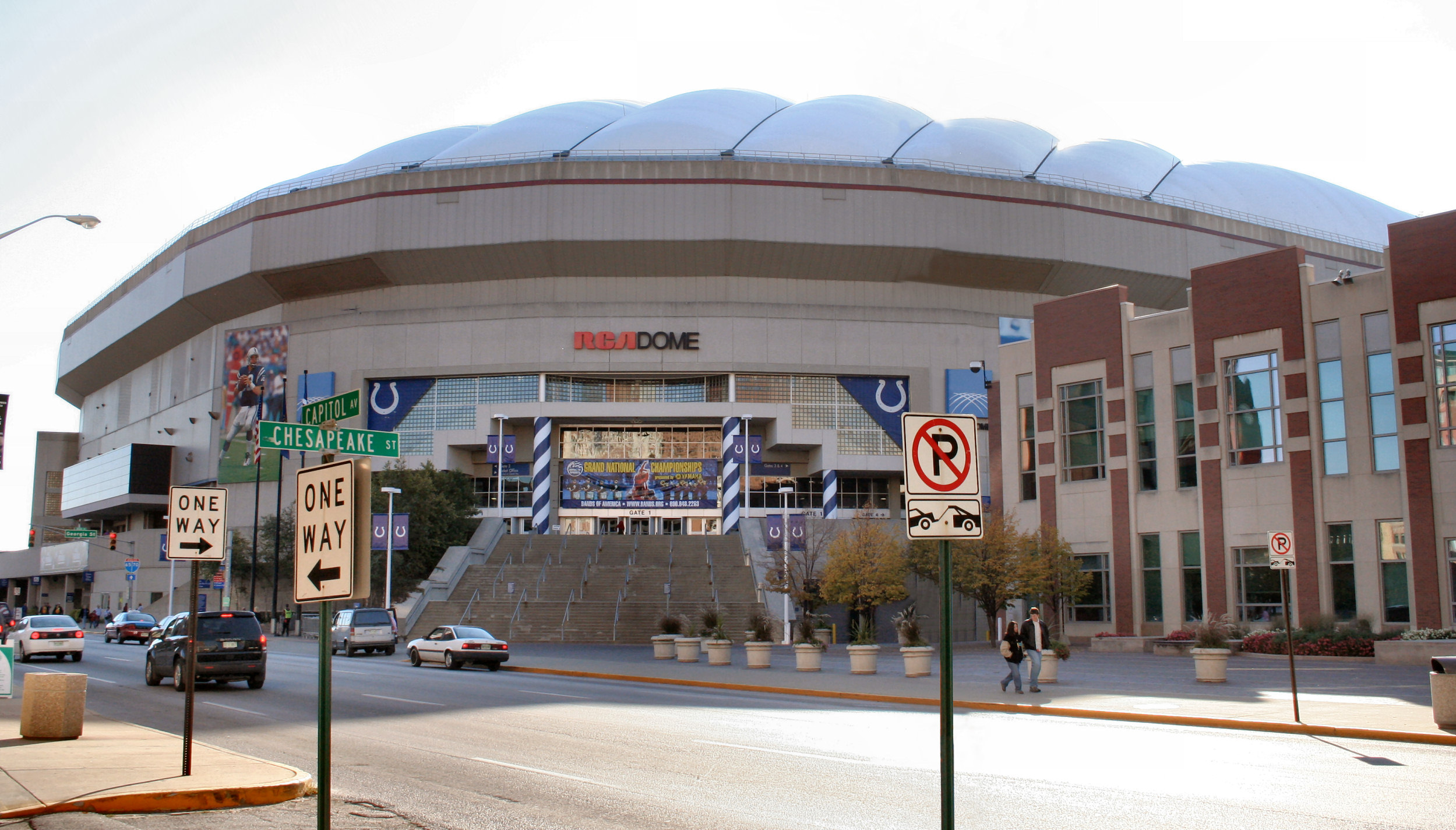
- RCA Dome, site of the game
Pittsburgh Steelers (6) (11–5)	Indianapolis Colts (1) (14–2)
21	18
Head coach: Bill Cowher	Head coach: Tony Dungy
	1	2	3	4	Total
PIT	14	0	7	0	21
IND	0	3	0	15	18
- Date: January 15, 2006
- Stadium: RCA Dome; Indianapolis, Indiana
- Favorite: Colts by 9.5
- Referee: Pete Morelli
- Attendance: 57,449

TV in the United States
- Network: CBS
- Announcers: Dick Enberg (play-by-play); Dan Dierdorf (color analyst); Armen Keteyian (sideline reporter)

The 2005 Pittsburgh Steelers–Indianapolis Colts playoff game was a National Football League (NFL) Divisional Round playoff game between the sixth-seeded Pittsburgh Steelers and the top-seeded Indianapolis Colts, taking place during the 2005–06 NFL playoffs at the RCA Dome in Indianapolis, Indiana on January 15, 2006.

Although memorable for other reasons, the game is best remembered for a late-game fumble by Steelers running back Jerome Bettis forced by Colts player Gary Brackett just as the Steelers appeared to have the game won, which was recovered by Colts player Nick Harper and returned near midfield until Ben Roethlisberger made a shoestring tackle to prevent what would have likely been a game-winning touchdown for the Colts. The play, which became known both as The Immaculate Redemption (as a play on the earlier Immaculate Reception that the Steelers were on the winning side of) and The Tackle (not to be confused with an earlier play during Super Bowl XXXIV), has since entered Pittsburgh sports lore, and while initially appearing to be fatal helped the Steelers pull off an upset victory over the Colts. With the victory, the Steelers advanced to the AFC Championship Game, the first-ever number six seed to advance to either an AFC or NFC Championship Game, en route to the team's victory in Super Bowl XL, its first Super Bowl victory in 26 years. In the game's aftermath, organizational changes by the Colts preceded its first Super Bowl victory since moving to Indianapolis in 1984 only one year later.

The game has been featured on NFL Films Game of the Week, and is often marked as one of the greatest NFL games of all time, as well as one of the biggest upsets in NFL history.

== Background ==
Entering the 2005 NFL season, both teams were expected to be playoff contenders following strong seasons from the year before. How both teams entered the playoffs would be different, however.

=== Pittsburgh Steelers ===
Pittsburgh attempted to replicate its success from 2004, when it finished 15–1 behind one of the league's stingiest defenses, a strong running game, and the unexpected success of rookie quarterback Ben Roethlisberger before losing to the eventual Super Bowl champion New England Patriots in the 2004 AFC Championship Game. (A game that would later be referenced in the Patriots Spygate scandal.) The Steelers started off 7–2 before a midseason injury to Roethlisberger led to him missing three games and the Steelers going on a three-game losing streak. A four-game winning streak at the end of the season helped the Steelers barely edge off the Kansas City Chiefs for the AFC's final playoff spot. (The four game streak was sparked by a decisive win over the Chicago Bears during which Bettis, en route to a 101-yard game, drove Chicago's middle linebacker Brian Urlacher and two other defenders for a five-yard touchdown run.)

Finishing 11–5, the team had tied the rival Cincinnati Bengals for the AFC North division title, but lost the division to the Bengals on tiebreakers despite splitting the season series. The two teams would meet in the AFC Wild Card Round, best remembered for Bengals quarterback Carson Palmer tearing his ACL on the game's second play from scrimmage on a controversial hit by Steelers defensive end Kimo von Oelhoffen, which at the time was legal and didn't involve a penalty. The Steelers won 31–17, advancing to face the Colts.

=== Indianapolis Colts ===
For the Colts, 2005 marked the fourth season of head coach Tony Dungy, after he had retooled the defense to his Tampa 2 style while leaving the high-octane offense, led by quarterback Peyton Manning, untouched. While the Colts made the playoffs in each of Dungy's first three years in Indianapolis, the team struggled to get past the rival New England Patriots, mainly due to the subpar defense that was in place prior to Dungy's arrival. The team started off 13–0 before losing two of its final three games, winning the AFC South and finishing an NFL-best 14–2, having home-field advantage throughout the playoffs, as well as a first-round bye.

2005 also marked the eighth season for both Manning and Colts kicker Mike Vanderjagt. Vanderjagt, who was the NFL's all-time most accurate kicker after eight seasons, had a contentious relationship with Manning at best. Following the Colts' elimination from the postseason in 2002, Vanderjagt made critical comments about Manning and Dungy to a Canadian television station. Vanderjagt questioned Manning's leadership skills and was critical of Dungy's level-headed temperament. During an interview at the 2003 Pro Bowl, the normally stoic Manning referred to Vanderjagt as the team's "idiot kicker" and accused him of being intoxicated during the interview. However, the two appeared to have made amends (at least publicly) by the 2005 playoffs.

=== Pregame news and notes ===
The matchup would be a rematch of the two teams' Week 12 matchup on Monday Night Football, which the Colts handily defeated the Steelers at the RCA Dome 26–7, during the Steelers aforementioned three-game losing streak and was also Roethlisberger's first game back from injury. Steelers receiver Hines Ward said after that game, which brought the Colts up to 11–0, that "It’s tough to go undefeated, but they have the potential."

The game would mark the fifth postseason meeting between the two teams, and the first to take place in Indianapolis; the two teams met at Memorial Stadium in Baltimore in 1976 (during the Colts' time in Baltimore) while the other three matchups (1975, 1995, and 1996) were all in Pittsburgh at Three Rivers Stadium, the first one being the introduction of the Terrible Towel. This would be the only postseason meeting between the two at the RCA Dome; the two teams have yet to meet in the postseason at their current stadiums, Acrisure Stadium and Lucas Oil Stadium. The Steelers won all previous postseason matchups.

The night before the game, Colts cornerback Nick Harper was involved in an altercation with his wife that resulted in him getting cut with a knife in his right leg, requiring stitches. Harper nearly missed the game, but was able to play and would foreshadow his notable play in the game.

The game had been expected to be a victory for the Colts in a possible matchup to face the New England Patriots in the AFC Championship game the following week and leading a "passing the torch" moment between Manning and Tom Brady. However, the Denver Broncos defeated the Patriots the previous day 27–13, giving the Patriots their first postseason loss during the Brady–Belichick era. The victor would face the Broncos instead, either at home (for the Colts) or in Denver (for the Steelers) at Invesco Field at Mile High.

== The game ==
The Steelers drove 84 yards and scored on their opening possession. Pittsburgh quarterback Ben Roethlisberger completed six consecutive passes for 76 yards, including a 36-yard completion to tight end Heath Miller and a 6-yard touchdown pass to Antwaan Randle El. Later in the first quarter, Roethlisberger's 45-yard completion to Hines Ward moved the ball to the Colts 8-yard line, and they scored another touchdown with his 7-yard pass to Miller, increasing the Steelers' lead to 14–0.

Five minutes into the second quarter, Indianapolis advanced the ball 96 yards to the Steelers 2-yard line and taking 9:39 off the clock, then Mike Vanderjagt kicked a field goal, cutting their deficit to 14–3.

Late in the third quarter, Steelers linebacker James Farrior (who finished the game with eight tackles and 2 1/2 sacks) sacked Manning at the Colts 1-yard line on third down, and Randle El returned Hunter Smith's ensuing punt 20 yards to the Indianapolis 30. Five plays later, Jerome Bettis scored a 1-yard touchdown run, making the score 21–3. But this time, Indianapolis struck back, driving 72 yards in six plays and scoring with Manning's 50-yard touchdown pass to tight end Dallas Clark. During the drive, Manning waved off the punt team being sent on the field by Dungy on 4th down and 2 at the Colts' 36-yard line, which Dungy allowed; the ensuing snap led to a 13-yard pass play to Brandon Stokley to eventually set up Clark's touchdown. The Steelers were forced to punt on their ensuing drive, after taking over seven minutes off the clock, leaving just 6:03 left in the game by the time Indianapolis got the ball back.

One play after the punt, an interception by Pittsburgh safety Troy Polamalu was overturned by instant replay, which the league would later admit was a mistake. Taking advantage of his second chance, Manning completed a 9-yard pass to Clark, a 20-yard pass to Marvin Harrison, and a 24-yard pass to Reggie Wayne, moving the ball to the Steelers 3-yard line. Running back Edgerrin James finished the drive with a 3-yard touchdown run, and then Manning threw a pass to Wayne for a successful 2-point conversion, cutting the Colts deficit to 21–18. The Steelers were forced to punt on their ensuing drive. With 1:20 left in the game, Manning was sacked on 4th and 16 by Joey Porter at the Colts' 2-yard line, and the ball was turned over to the Steelers on downs.

=== Bettis' fumble ===
Because the Colts still had all three timeouts remaining, the Steelers could not take a quarterback kneel, and had to try to advance the ball or score. A field goal would have put the Steelers up by six, while a touchdown would essentially seal the win for Pittsburgh. A forward pass ran the risk of an interception, and with the Steelers only needing two yards to score, combined with Bettis' historically low fumble percentage, the Steelers opted to run the ball in for the game-clinching score.

On Pittsburgh's first play of their final drive, as Bettis tried to run for a touchdown, he fumbled for the first time all season when linebacker Gary Brackett popped the ball from Bettis' hands with his helmet. Indianapolis defensive back Nick Harper recovered the ball and appeared to be on his way for a touchdown that would have given the Colts the lead when Roethlisberger barely made a season saving tackle at the Colts' 42-yard line, recovering from getting spun around to grab Harper's ankle, which brought him down; Jerame Tuman downed Harper to end the play.

Eventually, the Colts then advanced to the Pittsburgh 28-yard line, but key stops by rookie Bryant McFadden while trying to go for a touchdown forced the Colts to go for a field goal. However, Vanderjagt, who had been perfect at home in the playoffs, subsequently missed a 46-yard game-tying field goal attempt wide right with 17 seconds left, and the Steelers ran out the clock. Vanderjagt, who took his helmet off on the field and threw it down in disgust, would be penalized for unsportsmanlike conduct.

== Aftermath ==
=== Pittsburgh ===
The Steelers, buoyed by the momentum of pulling off one of the biggest upsets in NFL history, went to Denver to defeat the Broncos 34–17, giving head coach Bill Cowher his first win in the AFC Championship Game on the road and his only decisive win in the games, having previously played the game at home five times (1994, 1995, 1997, 2001, and 2004) losing four of those matchups and only winning the 1995 AFC Championship Game (coincidentally against the Colts) on a dropped Hail Mary pass by then-Colts quarterback Jim Harbaugh to Aaron Bailey. The Steelers advanced to Super Bowl XL, their first Super Bowl appearance since Super Bowl XXX ten years prior. The Steelers defeated the Seattle Seahawks 21–10 to win their fifth Vince Lombardi Trophy and the first since the Steelers dynasty years of the 1970s. Bettis retired immediately after the game and was inducted into the Pro Football Hall of Fame in 2015; Cowher resigned one year later after 15 seasons as Steelers head coach and was elected into the Pro Football Hall of Fame himself in 2020.

The Steelers' victory marked the first time since the playoffs were expanded to six teams per conference in 1990 that a number six-seeded team defeated the top seed in the playoffs; only the strike shortened season New York Jets (in 1982), Philadelphia Eagles (in 2008), Green Bay Packers (in 2010), and Tennessee Titans (in 2019) have since repeated this feat, with the Packers going on to win Super Bowl XLV (coincidentally, beating the Steelers in that game); the NFL expanded to seven teams per conference for the 2020 NFL season, making the feat more likely. In the second year of the expanded format, the San Francisco 49ers (in 2021) became the next team to do so.

Within seconds of the Bettis fumble, a Steelers fan watching the game at a bar had a heart attack. The fan survived the heart attack and would have a pacemaker installed.

=== Indianapolis ===
Vanderjagt's missed field goal would be his last play as a Colt, as his contract expired and the Colts (fed up with his off-field antics at this point) elected not to renew his deal, replacing him with former Patriots kicker Adam Vinatieri, who would go on to have a second career with the Colts and become both the Patriots and Colts' all-time leading scorer. Vanderjagt would sign with the Dallas Cowboys but would be cut midseason and left the NFL altogether.

Along with Vanderjagt, it would also mark the last game in a Colts uniform for Hall of Fame running back Edgerrin James, who departed for the Arizona Cardinals via free agency after becoming the Colts' all-time leading rusher.

Despite losing James, replacing Vanderjagt with Vinatieri would prove to make a difference for the Colts, who would go on to win Super Bowl XLI the following season. Despite no longer being on the team, Colts owner Jim Irsay still sent James a Super Bowl ring. James would eventually play in the Super Bowl as a member of the Cardinals, losing Super Bowl XLIII against the Steelers 27–23.

== Quotes ==
=== Tunch Ilkin's reactions ===
The game would be notable for former Steelers offensive lineman and then-current Pittsburgh Steelers Radio Network analyst Tunch Ilkin for his quotes regarding the game near the end:

[After Joey Porter's 4th down sack on Peyton Manning] "Call up the travel agent, make the reservations, we are off to Denver."

"For all of you fantasy football players out there who have Jerome, you have to be pretty excited right about now." (Bill Hillgrove) "Wouldn't it be something if he got his second touchdown of the game. [ball is snapped] Here's the give to Jerome, the ball is..."[Bettis fumbles at this point, with Harper's recovery] (Ilkin) "Fumble, FUMBLE, HE PICKED IT UP, OH NO! OH MY GOSH!" (Hillgrove) "NICK HARPER HAS IT..." (Ilkin) "OH MY GOSH, SOMEBODY'S GOTTA TACKLE HIM!" [Roethlisberger makes the tackle on Harper] (Hillgrove) "Jerome Bettis, who rarely fumbles, fumbles at the goal line, Nick Harper picks it up, and the Colts are still alive with 1:09 to go!" (Ilkin) "Oh my Gosh. Oh my gosh, all you got to do is fall on the ball. What a turn of events. Okay, you've got 1:09 left, the Colts got the ball on the 42 yard line. The game is not over, cancel the reservations to Denver. We got finish this one out here. Unbelieveable!"

Hillgrove and Ilkin both discussed how accurate Vanderjagt had been during the season, with Ilkin saying, "law of averages says he misses this one". He went to correct himself again following Vanderjagt's miss:

(Hillgrove) "Here's the snap, the kick is on its way. It's high enough..." (Hillgrove & Ilkin) "NO GOOD!" (Hillgrove) "IT'S NO GOOD!" (Ilkin) "OH MAN!" (Hillgrove) "It's no good!" (Ilkin) "CALL UP THE TRAVEL AGENT, REMAKE THOSE RESERVATIONS. WE ARE OFF TO DENVER."

Ilkin became known within a week for jumping the gun on a Steelers victory, so he waited until the Steelers-Broncos game was clearly decided before making similar comments about "going to Detroit".

=== CBS ===
The national broadcasting team of Dick Enberg and Dan Dierdorf on CBS, while more neutral, were equally as surprised as the local broadcasting teams of the events late in the game:

(Dan Dierdorf) Now there's three times out here left for the Colts. [ball is snapped] They gotta keep them out of the end zone. (Dick Enberg) Bettis... [Bettis fumbles] FUMBLED THE BALL. PICKED UP BY NICK HARPER. OH MY! HARPER WITH ROETHLISBERGER TO BEAT. ROETHLISBERGER MAKES THE TACKLE AT THE 43 YARD LINE. CAN YOU BELIEVE THIS? (Dierdorf) NO I CAN'T! [pause] (Enberg) And Ben Roethlisberger saved the game for the Steelers. (Dierdorf) And there are people who are out the door who are streaming back to their seats!

(Enberg) It's a bit surprising they did not buy more yardage for Vanderjagt, who now must kick this 46 yard field goal, to tie. [ball is snapped and kicked] And it's NO GOOD! (Dierdorf) He missed it. (Enberg) NOT EVEN CLOSE! WIDE RIGHT! [pause] (Dierdorf) That is a shock. Mike Vanderjagt has been money over the years for the Colts.

[during the final kneel-down by the Steelers] (Dierdorf) And how happy are the fans in Denver that they are going to be hosting the AFC Championship game.

Coincidentally, Enberg had also called the two teams' aforementioned previous postseason matchup in the 1995 AFC Championship Game while working for NBC and even referenced that game's last play during the Colts' final drive.

== See also ==
- Immaculate Reception
- Miracle at the Meadowlands
- Miracle at the New Meadowlands
- Wide Right
- Fail Mary
- The Fumble
- 2005 Pittsburgh Steelers season
- 2005 Indianapolis Colts season
- List of nicknamed NFL games and plays
