= Gary Brackett =

American football player (born 1980)

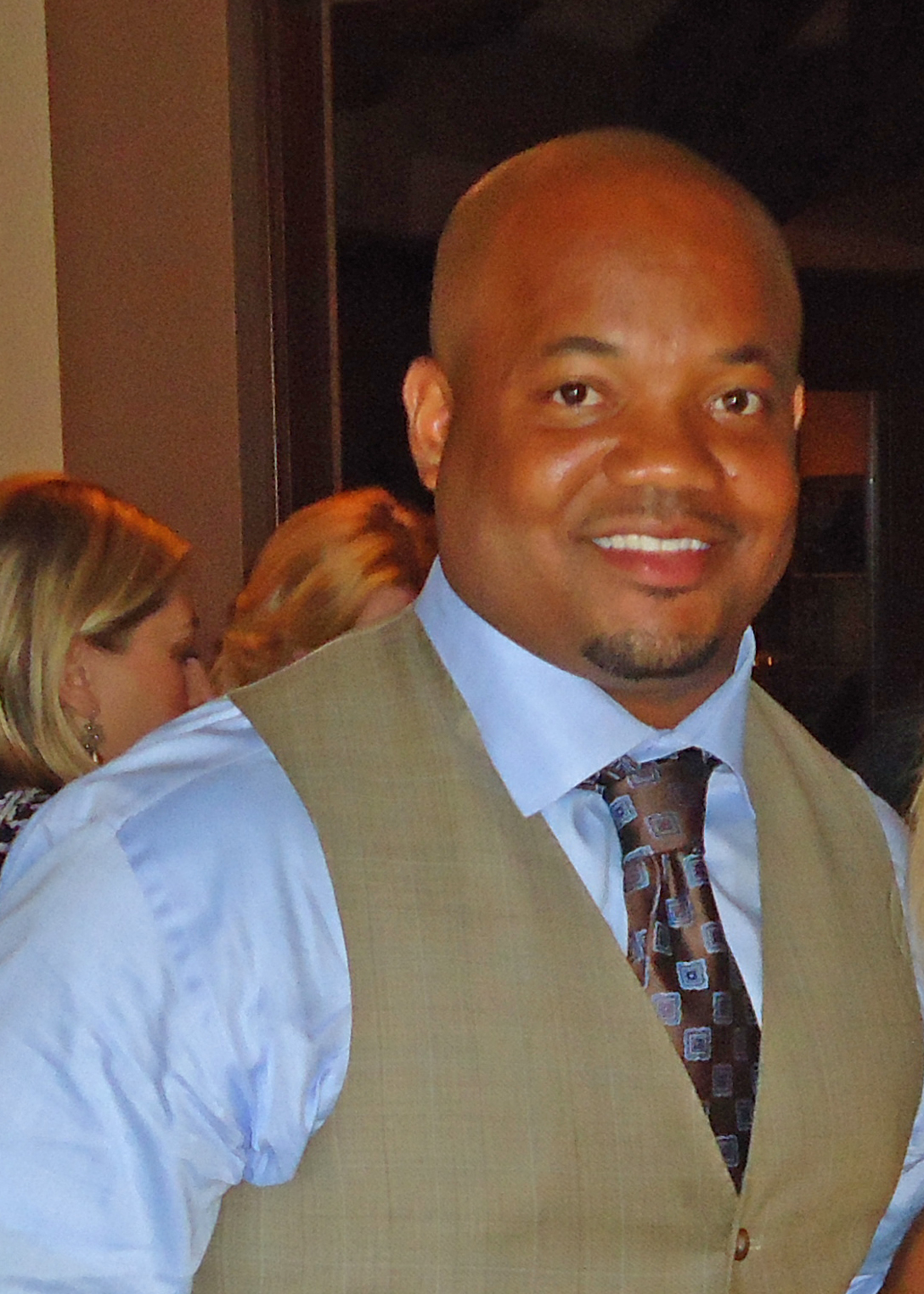

No. 58
- Position: Linebacker

Personal information
- Born: May 23, 1980 (age 46); Glassboro, New Jersey, U.S.
- Listed height: 5 ft 11 in (1.80 m)
- Listed weight: 235 lb (107 kg)

Career information
- High school: Glassboro
- College: Rutgers
- NFL draft: 2003: undrafted

Career history
- Indianapolis Colts (2003–2011)

Awards and highlights
- Super Bowl champion (XLI)

Career NFL statistics
- Total tackles: 712
- Sacks: 4
- Forced fumbles: 5
- Fumble recoveries: 3
- Pass deflections: 29
- Interceptions: 12
- Touchdowns: 1
- Stats at Pro Football Reference

Gary Lawrence Brackett (born May 23, 1980) is an American former professional football player who was a linebacker in the National Football League (NFL). He played college football for the Rutgers Scarlet Knights, and signed with the Indianapolis Colts as an undrafted free agent in 2003. Brackett played for the Colts for his entire 9-year career, and was part of their Super Bowl XLI winning team.

== Early life ==
Brackett attended Glassboro High School in Glassboro, New Jersey. He was a two-time All-South Jersey selection, a two-time All-Group I choice, and a two-time All-Tri-County Conference choice.

== College career ==
Brackett was a walk-on to the Rutgers University football team. By his senior year, he was captain of the defensive team and won the team's defensive MVP honors.

== Professional career ==
On April 27, 2003, the Indianapolis Colts signed Brackett as an undrafted free agent after he was not selected in the 2003 NFL draft.

Brackett competed for a roster spot as a backup linebacker and special teams player during training camp in 2003. He impressed the coaching staff with his ability covering kickoffs. He made his professional regular season debut during the Indianapolis Colts' season-opener at the Cleveland Browns. He finished their 9–6 win with one solo tackle. On October 26, 2003, Brackett collected a season-high six combined tackles (five solo) during a 30–21 victory against the Houston Texans in Week 8. In Week 12, Brackett made three solo tackles and made his first career sack as the Colts defeated the Buffalo Bills 17–14. He sacked Bills' quarterback Drew Bledsoe for a nine-yard loss during the second quarter.

In 2005, he had 127 tackles, three interceptions and a sack. In the divisional round against the Steelers, he forced a fumble from Jerome Bettis that teammate Nick Harper would have returned for a touchdown had Ben Roethlisberger not made a touchdown saving tackle. In 2006, he was named defensive captain of the Colts and had 120 tackles. He started for the Colts in their Super Bowl XLI win over the Chicago Bears. In 2007 Brackett recorded 116 tackles and four interceptions. He recorded 99 tackles in both 2008 and 2009. He started for the Colts in their Super Bowl XLIV loss to the New Orleans Saints. He was released following the 2011 season on March 9, 2012. And after the Colts released Brackett, he quickly announced his retirement from the NFL.

During his career, Brackett was twice named AFC Defensive Player-of-the-Week.

== NFL career statistics ==
Legend
	Led the league
**Bold**	Career high

=== Regular season ===
Year	Team	Games		Tackles					Interceptions					Fumbles			
Year	Team	GP	GS	Cmb	Solo	Ast	Sck	TFL	Int	Yds	TD	Lng	PD	FF	FR	Yds	TD
2003	IND	16	0	31	27	4	**1.0**	3	1	31	**1**	31	1	0	0	0	0
2004	IND	15	1	37	25	12	0.0	1	2	2	0	2	3	0	0	0	0
2005	IND	16	16	**127**	**92**	**35**	**1.0**	0	3	50	0	31	6	0	0	0	0
2006	IND	14	14	122	87	**35**	0.0	4	0	0	0	0	2	**3**	0	0	0
2007	IND	16	16	116	86	30	0.5	2	**4**	**128**	0	**49**	**7**	1	**1**	0	**1**
2008	IND	12	12	100	71	29	0.0	1	0	0	0	0	1	1	**1**	**68**	**1**
2009	IND	14	14	99	80	19	**1.0**	4	1	8	0	8	5	0	**1**	0	0
2010	IND	12	12	74	53	21	0.5	**6**	0	0	0	0	3	0	0	0	0
2011	IND	1	1	6	5	1	0.0	0	1	27	0	27	1	0	0	0	0
		116	86	712	526	186	4.0	21	12	246	1	49	29	5	3	68	2

=== Playoffs ===
Year	Team	Games		Tackles					Interceptions					Fumbles			
Year	Team	GP	GS	Cmb	Solo	Ast	Sck	TFL	Int	Yds	TD	Lng	PD	FF	FR	Yds	TD
2003	IND	3	0	16	7	**9**	0	0	0	0	0	0	0	0	0	0	0
2004	IND	2	1	16	13	3	0	0	0	0	0	0	1	0	0	0	0
2005	IND	1	1	10	8	2	0	0	0	0	0	0	0	**1**	0	0	0
2006	IND	4	4	**23**	**17**	6	0	**2**	0	0	0	0	1	0	**1**	0	0
2007	IND	1	1	4	2	2	0	0	0	0	0	0	0	0	0	0	0
2009	IND	3	3	18	14	4	**1**	**2**	0	0	0	0	**2**	0	0	0	0
2010	IND	1	1	7	3	4	0	0	0	0	0	0	1	0	0	0	0
		15	11	94	64	30	1	4	0	0	0	0	5	1	1	0	0

== Life after the NFL ==
Brackett earned a Master of Business Administration degree after retirement and opened a series of restaurants in Indianapolis, including CharBlue downtown.

== Personal life ==
During a 17-month span, starting in 2003, Brackett lost his mother, father, and brother.

In 2009 Brackett was the 11th annual recipient of the Arthur S. Arkush Humanitarian Award, presented to an NFL player "whose contributions to the community and charitable organizations are especially outstanding." He won the award for his work with the IMPACT Foundation, a charity he founded in the spring of 2007.

In 2011, Brackett published Winning: From Walk-On to Captain, In Football and Life, a memoir about his life, including his accomplishments and struggles with family, college, and the NFL.

Gary and his wife Ragan have three children: Gabrielle, Gary Jr., and, Georgia Reese
