= Keyon =

Keyon is a given name. Notable people with the given name include:

- Keyon Dooling (born 1980), American basketball player
- Keyon Harrold (born 1980), American jazz trumpeter, vocalist, songwriter and producer
- Keyon Martin (born 2001), American football player
- Keyon Nash (born 1979), American football player
- Keyon Whiteside (born 1980), American football player
