= Marcus Pollard =

American football player (born 1972)

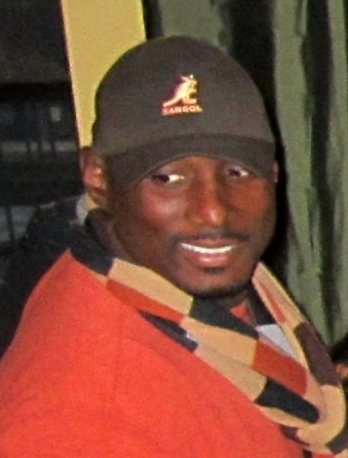
- Pollard in 2012

Jacksonville Jaguars
- Positions: Director of player engagement and youth football

Personal information
- Born: February 8, 1972 (age 54); Valley, Alabama, U.S.
- Listed height: 6 ft 3 in (1.91 m)
- Listed weight: 255 lb (116 kg)

Career information
- High school: Valley (Valley, Alabama)
- College: SCCC (1990–1992); Bradley (1992–1994)
- NFL draft: 1995: undrafted

Career history
- Indianapolis Colts (1995–2004); Detroit Lions (2005–2006); Seattle Seahawks (2007); New England Patriots (2008)*; Atlanta Falcons (2008)
- * Offseason or practice squad member only

Career NFL statistics
- Receptions: 349
- Receiving yards: 4,280
- Receiving touchdowns: 40
- Stats at Pro Football Reference

Marcus LaJuan Pollard (born February 8, 1972) is an American former professional football tight end who is currently the director of player engagement and youth football for the Jacksonville Jaguars. He played 14 seasons in the National Football League (NFL) with the Indianapolis Colts, Detroit Lions, Seattle Seahawks, and Atlanta Falcons. Pollard was also an off-season member of the New England Patriots.

== Early life ==
Marcus Pollard was born on February 8, 1972, in Valley, Alabama and attended Valley High School, where he played both football and basketball.

== College career ==
=== Seward County Community College ===
Pollard began his college basketball career at Seward County Community College in Liberal, Kansas from 1990 to 1992. While at Seward, Pollard averaged 12.3 points per game and won 28 total games. As a sophomore, Pollard averaged 14.9 points and 9.3 rebounds per game.

=== Bradley University ===
Pollard transferred to Bradley University in Peoria, Illinois for his junior and senior seasons. Pollard started 49 of 58 games at Forward during his two years with Bradley, where he averaged 7.3 points and 5.0 rebounds per game with a 49.7% field goal percentage. In the 1993–94 season, Pollard helped Bradley complete a turnaround from their previous 11–16 record. Bradley finished with a 23–8 record, having reached the third round of the National Invitational Tournament.

Pollard was inducted into the Bradley Athletics Hall of Fame in 2005 and the Missouri Valley Conference Hall of Fame in 2017.

== Professional career ==
=== Indianapolis Colts (1995–2004) ===
Despite not having played college football, Pollard was signed by the Indianapolis Colts as an undrafted free agent in 1995. He spent 10 seasons with the Colts, initially as a blocking tight end. However, Pollard quickly developed into a reliable pass-catching tight end, and ended his time in Indianapolis with a total of 263 receptions for 3,391 yards and 35 touchdowns.

Pollard's breakout season with the Colts came in 1998. He started 11 of 16 games and had 24 receptions for 309 yards and four touchdowns. The 2001 season was Pollard's best, when he totaled 47 receptions for 739 yards and eight touchdowns. On November 11, 2004, Pollard caught two touchdowns to help the Colts to a 31–28 victory over the Minnesota Vikings.

After the emergence of tight end Dallas Clark in Indianapolis left Pollard expendable, Pollard was released following the 2004 season.

=== Detroit Lions (2005–2006) ===
Pollard spent two seasons with the Detroit Lions, where he started 21 of 31 games. His most productive season in Detroit came in 2005, where Pollard started all 16 games and recorded 46 receptions for 516 yards and three touchdowns. He was released by the Lions following the 2006 season.

=== Seattle Seahawks (2007) ===
The Seattle Seahawks signed Pollard for the 2007 season, his only year in Seattle. Pollard started 10 of the 14 games he appeared in, with 28 receptions for 273 yards and two touchdowns.

=== New England Patriots (2008) ===
Pollard signed with the New England Patriots prior to the 2008 season. However, he was released in August before the regular season began.

=== Atlanta Falcons (2008) ===
After being released from the Patriots, Pollard was picked up by the Atlanta Falcons at the beginning of the 2008 season. He was there for one year before retiring.

== NFL career statistics ==
=== Regular season ===
Year	Team	Games		Receiving				
Year	Team	GP	GS	Rec	Yds	Avg	Lng	TD
1995	IND	8	0	0	0	0.0	0	0
1996	IND	16	4	6	86	14.3	48	1
1997	IND	16	6	10	116	11.6	28	0
1998	IND	16	11	24	309	12.9	44	4
1999	IND	16	12	34	374	11.0	33	4
2000	IND	16	14	30	439	14.6	50	3
2001	IND	16	16	47	739	15.7	86	8
2002	IND	15	15	43	478	11.1	41	6
2003	IND	14	13	40	541	13.5	70	3
2004	IND	13	13	29	309	10.7	31	6
2005	DET	16	16	46	516	11.2	86	3
2006	DET	15	5	12	100	8.3	22	0
2007	SEA	14	10	28	273	9.8	22	2
2008	ATL	1	0	0	0	0.0	0	0
Career		192	135	349	4,280	12.3	86	40

=== Postseason ===
Year	Team	Games		Receiving				
Year	Team	GP	GS	Rec	Yds	Avg	Lng	TD
1995	IND	2	0	0	0	0.0	0	0
1996	IND	1	0	0	0	0.0	0	0
1999	IND	1	1	1	10	10.0	10	0
2000	IND	1	1	1	13	13.0	13	0
2002	IND	1	1	1	16	16.0	16	0
2003	IND	3	3	10	156	15.6	32	1
2004	IND	2	2	3	30	10.0	25	0
2007	SEA	2	2	1	3	3.0	3	0
2008	ATL	1	0	2	7	3.5	6	0
Career		14	10	19	235	12.4	32	1

== Front office career ==
Since 2013, Pollard has served as the Director of Player Engagement and Youth Football for the Jacksonville Jaguars.

== Personal life ==
Pollard and his wife, Amani, were cast members of the reality television show The Amazing Race 19. They finished the competition in third place out of 11 teams. They have four children. Pollard's son, Micah, currently plays college football for the University of Michigan.
