= Rocky Freitas =

American football player and administrator (1945–2022)

No. 76, 74
- Position: Offensive tackle

Personal information
- Born: September 7, 1945; Kailua, Hawaii, U.S.
- Died: June 8, 2022 (aged 76)
- Listed height: 6 ft 6 in (1.98 m)
- Listed weight: 270 lb (122 kg)

Career information
- High school: Honolulu (HI) Kamehameha
- College: Oregon State (1963-1966)
- NFL draft: 1967: 3rd round, 73rd overall pick

Career history

Playing
- Detroit Lions (1968–1977); Tampa Bay Buccaneers (1978)

Operations
- Hawaii (2012) Interim athletic director

Awards and highlights
- Second-team All-Pro (1972); Pro Bowl (1972)

Career NFL statistics
- Games played: 134
- Games started: 117
- Fumble recoveries: 2
- Stats at Pro Football Reference

Rockne Crowningburg (Rocky) Freitas (September 7, 1945 – June 8, 2022) was an American professional football player who was an offensive tackle for the Detroit Lions and the Tampa Bay Buccaneers in an eleven-year career that lasted from 1968 to 1978 in the National Football League (NFL). He was also elected to the board of trustees for the Office of Hawaiian Affairs.

Freitas played college football at Oregon State University and was drafted in the third round of the 1967 NFL/AFL draft by the Pittsburgh Steelers. He was selected to the Pro Bowl after the 1972 season. His son Makoa was selected in the 2003 NFL draft by the Indianapolis Colts.

Following his NFL career, Freitas served in various leadership roles in education, including at Ke Aliʻi Pauahi Foundation, Kamehameha Schools, and GRG Enterprises. He also served as the chancellor of Hawaiʻi Community College for six years, as vice president for university relations for the University of Hawaiʻi System, and as associate athletic director for the University of Hawaiʻi at Mānoa. As a vice president of the University of Hawaii System, Freitas was instrumental in negotiating a move of the UH football team from the Western Athletic Conference to the Mountain West Conference in 2010 during the 2010–2014 NCAA conference realignment. Freitas served as the chancellor for the University of Hawaiʻi at West Oʻahu from 2013 until his retirement in 2015.
