= Idrees Bashir =

American football player (born 1978)

No. 28, 33, 44
- Position: Safety

Personal information
- Born: December 7, 1978 (age 47); Decatur, Georgia, U.S.
- Listed height: 6 ft 2 in (1.88 m)
- Listed weight: 198 lb (90 kg)

Career information
- High school: Dunwoody (GA)
- College: Memphis
- NFL draft: 2001: 2nd round, 37th overall pick

Career history
- Indianapolis Colts (2001–2004); Carolina Panthers (2005); Detroit Lions (2006–2007)

Career NFL statistics
- Total tackles: 256
- Forced fumbles: 3
- Fumble recoveries: 5
- Pass deflections: 16
- Interceptions: 6
- Stats at Pro Football Reference

Idrees Bashir (/ˈɪdriːs bəˈʃɪər/ ID-reess bə-SHEER; born December 7, 1978) is an American former professional football player who was a safety in the National Football League (NFL). He played college football for the Memphis Tigers. He was selected by the Indianapolis Colts in the second round of the 2001 NFL draft.

Bashir was also a member of the Carolina Panthers and Detroit Lions.

== Professional career ==
Bashir, a defensive back out of University of Memphis, was selected in the second round of the 2001 NFL draft by the Indianapolis Colts with the 37th overall pick. Bashir played in 51 games over 4 seasons (2001–2004) with the Colts, amassing 234 tackles and 5 INT's. After signing with the Panthers prior to the 2005 season, Bashir appeared in 11 games, and had only 2 tackles. He finished the season on the injured reserve with a hamstring injury.

On January 2, 2007, Bashir was signed by the Detroit Lions.

== NFL career statistics ==
Legend
**Bold**	Career high

=== Regular season ===
Year	Team	Games		Tackles					Interceptions					Fumbles			
Year	Team	GP	GS	Cmb	Solo	Ast	Sck	TFL	Int	Yds	TD	Lng	PD	FF	FR	Yds	TD
2001	IND	**15**	**15**	**83**	**59**	**24**	0.0	0	1	0	0	0	**5**	0	0	0	0
2002	IND	14	14	50	36	14	0.0	1	**2**	4	0	4	**5**	**1**	1	0	0
2003	IND	9	9	43	29	14	0.0	0	**2**	**9**	0	**9**	4	**1**	1	0	0
2004	IND	13	13	58	41	17	0.0	**2**	0	0	0	0	1	**1**	1	0	0
2005	CAR	11	0	2	1	1	0.0	0	0	0	0	0	0	0	0	0	0
2007	DET	9	1	20	15	5	0.0	0	1	0	0	0	1	0	**2**	0	0
		71	52	256	181	75	0.0	3	6	13	0	9	16	3	5	0	0

=== Playoffs ===
Year	Team	Games		Tackles					Interceptions					Fumbles			
Year	Team	GP	GS	Cmb	Solo	Ast	Sck	TFL	Int	Yds	TD	Lng	PD	FF	FR	Yds	TD
2002	IND	1	1	**9**	**5**	**4**	0.0	0	0	0	0	0	0	0	0	0	0
2003	IND	**2**	**2**	5	3	2	0.0	0	0	0	0	0	0	0	0	0	0
2004	IND	**2**	**2**	5	4	1	0.0	0	0	0	0	0	0	0	0	0	0
		5	5	19	12	7	0.0	0	0	0	0	0	0	0	0	0	0
