= Ricky Williams (American football, born 1978) =

American football player (born 1978)

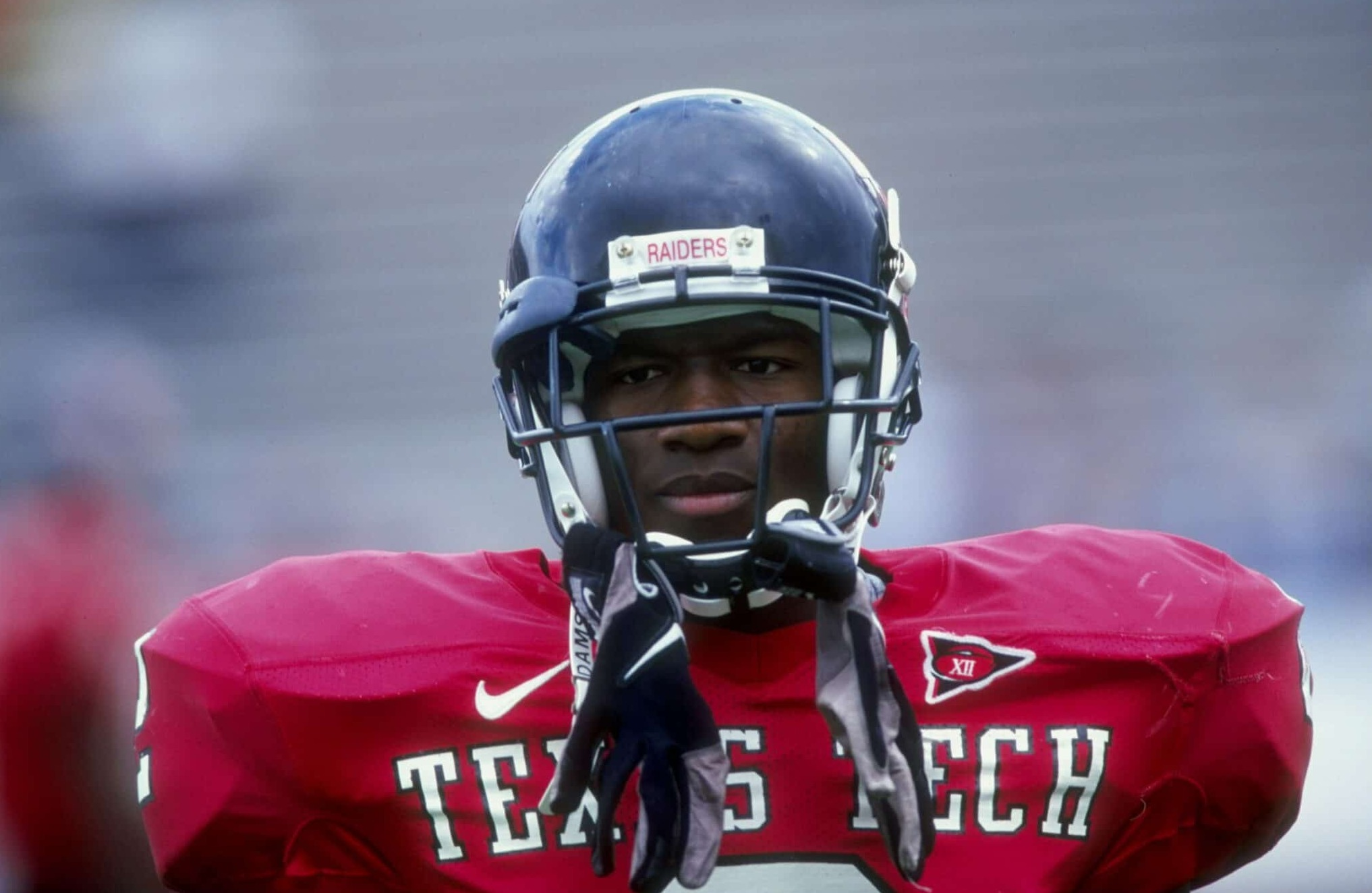
- Williams with Texas Tech

No. 35
- Position: Running back

Personal information
- Born: August 29, 1978 (age 48); Dallas, Texas, U.S.
- Listed height: 5 ft 7 in (1.70 m)
- Listed weight: 195 lb (88 kg)

Career information
- High school: Duncanville (TX)
- College: Texas Tech
- NFL draft: 2002: undrafted

Career history
- New Orleans Saints (2002)*; Indianapolis Colts (2002–2003)
- * Offseason or practice squad member only

Awards and highlights
- First-team All-Big 12 (2001)

Career NFL statistics
- Rushing attempts: 59
- Rushing yards: 190
- Rushing touchdowns: 2
- Receptions: 23
- Receiving yards: 177
- Receiving touchdowns: 2
- Stats at Pro Football Reference

Ricky Antwan Williams (born August 29, 1978) is an American former professional football player who was a running back for the Indianapolis Colts of the National Football League (NFL). He played college football for the Texas Tech Red Raiders. Williams was born in Dallas, Texas.
