= Jim Newton (American football) =

American football player (born 1978)

No. 69, 62
- Position: Tackle

Personal information
- Born: October 13, 1978 (age 48); Omaha, Nebraska, U.S.
- Listed height: 6 ft 9 in (2.06 m)
- Listed weight: 297 lb (135 kg)

Career information
- High school: Newbury Park (Newbury Park, California)
- College: Utah State (1998–2002)
- NFL draft: 2003: undrafted

Career history
- Indianapolis Colts (2003–2004); Arizona Cardinals (2004–2005)*; Indianapolis Colts (2005)*
- * Offseason or practice squad member only

Career NFL statistics
- Games played: 3
- Stats at Pro Football Reference

James Christopher Newton (born October 13, 1978) is an American former professional football tackle who played in the National Football League (NFL) for the Indianapolis Colts and Arizona Cardinals. He played college football for the Utah State Aggies.

== Early life ==
Newton was born on October 13, 1978, in Omaha, Nebraska. He attended Newbury Park High School in Newbury Park, California.

== College career ==
Newton played college football for the Utah State Aggies from 1998 to 2002 and was a three-year starter. Listed at 6-foot-10-inches, he is believed to be the tallest football player in Utah State history.

== Professional career ==
=== Indianapolis Colts (first stint) ===
After going undrafted in the 2003 NFL draft, Newton signed with the Indianapolis Colts as an undrafted free agent. On August 31, he was waived and signed to the practice squad. Throughout the season, Newton was elevated to the active roster three times on special teams. On November 12, he was signed to the practice squad, where he stayed for the remainder of the year. On September 5, Newton was released.

=== Arizona Cardinals ===
On September 8, 2004, Newton was signed to the practice squad of the Arizona Cardinals. On January 4, 2005, he signed a reserve/futures contract with the team. On August 22, Newton was waived.

=== Indianapolis Colts (second stint) ===
On August 23, 2005, Newton was claimed off waivers by the Colts. On September 3, he was released by the team.
