= Tom Lopienski =

American football player (born 1979)

No. 36
- Position: Fullback

Personal information
- Born: June 12, 1979 (age 47); Parkersburg, West Virginia, U.S.
- Listed height: 6 ft 0 in (1.83 m)
- Listed weight: 246 lb (112 kg)

Career information
- High school: Walsh Jesuit (Cuyahoga Falls, Ohio)
- College: Notre Dame
- NFL draft: 2003: undrafted

Career history
- Indianapolis Colts (2003–2004); Tampa Bay Buccaneers (2005)*
- * Offseason or practice squad member only

Career NFL statistics
- Games played: 6
- Games started: 0
- Receptions (playoffs): 1
- Receiving yards (playoffs): 2
- Receiving touchdowns (playoffs): 1
- Stats at Pro Football Reference

Thomas Joseph Lopienski (born June 12, 1979) is an American former professional football player who was a fullback for two seasons with the Indianapolis Colts of the National Football League (NFL). He played college football for the Notre Dame Fighting Irish.

== Early life and college ==
Lopienski was born on June 12, 1979, in Parkersburg, West Virginia. He played high school football at Walsh Jesuit High School in Ohio, and college football at the University of Notre Dame.

== Professional career ==
=== Indianapolis Colts ===
Lopienski appeared in the last four games of the 2003 regular season for the Colts. On January 11, 2004, in a 38-31 divisional round victory over the Kansas City Chiefs in the 2003–04 NFL playoffs, he caught a 2-yard touchdown pass from Peyton Manning in the second quarter. Ironically, that touchdown pass would go on to be the only time Lopienski ever touched the ball during an NFL regular season or playoff game. He also played the following week in the AFC Championship Game, where the Colts lost to the New England Patriots by a score of 24–14.

In the 2004 season, Lopienski played in the Colts’ first two regular season games. He finished his NFL career having played six total regular games.

=== Tampa Bay Buccaneers ===
Lopienski signed a reserve/future contract with the Tampa Bay Buccaneers on January 28, 2005. He was waived on April 26, 2005.
