= Brad Pyatt =

American football player (born 1980)

No. 84, 88, 19
- Position: Wide receiver

Personal information
- Born: April 16, 1980 (age 46); Arvada, Colorado, U.S.
- Listed height: 5 ft 11 in (1.80 m)
- Listed weight: 195 lb (88 kg)

Career information
- High school: Arvada West (Arvada, CO)
- College: Kentucky; Northern Colorado
- NFL draft: 2003: undrafted

Career history
- Indianapolis Colts (2003–2005); St. Louis Rams (2006)*; Miami Dolphins (2006)*; Pittsburgh Steelers (2006)*; Colorado Crush (2007–2008)
- * Offseason or practice squad member only

Career NFL statistics
- Receptions: 3
- Receiving yards: 14
- Kickoff returns: 29
- Kickoff return yds: 774
- Punt returns: 20
- Punt return yds: 158
- Stats at Pro Football Reference

Career AFL statistics
- Receptions: 162
- Receiving yards: 1,845
- Touchdowns: 31
- Kickoff Returns: 3
- Kickoff Return Yards: 53
- Stats at ArenaFan.com

Bradley James Pyatt (born April 16, 1980) is an American entrepreneur and former professional football player. He played as a wide receiver in the National Football League (NFL) and Arena Football League (AFL) and was signed by the Indianapolis Colts as an undrafted free agent in 2003. He also played college football for the Kentucky Wildcats and Northern Colorado Bears. Pyatt is the founder of the sports nutrition company MusclePharm and co-founder of the plant-based protein bar brand TRUBAR and the cognitive performance supplement brand IQ Pouch.

== Early life and education ==
Pyatt is an Arvada West High School graduate and played for long-time high school coaching legend Dave Logan on the Wildcats’ Class 5A 1997 state championship team. He was a two-time high school All-American, two-time All-Colorado and All-State selection in 1996 and 1997. He was among the most-sought wide receivers in the country, recruited by over 50 colleges, led by: Southern California, Miami, Colorado, Kentucky, Michigan State, and Arizona.

== Football career ==
=== College career ===
Pyatt played at University of Kentucky and University of Northern Colorado after graduating high school despite having scholarship offers from Southern California and Miami. After 3 years with the Kentucky Wildcats and multiple injuries, Pyatt transferred to University of Northern Colorado in 2002.

=== Professional career ===
==== National Football League ====
Pyatt was signed by the National Football League’s (NFL) Indianapolis Colts as a free agent on July 16, 2003, and then played for three seasons in the NFL as the Colts' wide receiver. He returned 19 kickoffs for 544 yards - a 28.6 yard-per-return average - and 12 punts for 110 yards, an average of 9.2 yards per return over his first eight games.

Some of his accomplishments include a 38-yard kickoff return versus the Tennessee Titans on September 14, 2003, and a 50-yard kickoff return against the New Orleans Saints on September 28, 2003. One of the highlights of his playing career is his 90-yard kickoff return versus the Tampa Bay Buccaneers on October 6, 2003. The Colts recovered from the 21-point deficit at less than four minutes remaining, and won this comeback 38-35 when the play set up a touchdown during overtime. This comeback is considered the third best in NFL to-date by experts and analysts.

==== Arena Football League ====
Pyatt’s NFL career also included playing for the St. Louis Rams, Miami Dolphins, and Pittsburgh Steelers. In 2007, he joined the Colorado Crush as part of the Arena Football League for 2 years. He retired from playing pro-football in 2008.

==== Career statistics ====
Pyatt's professional football career spanned from 2003 to 2008 with the Indianapolis Colts and Colorado Crush. Over his professional career he caught 165 passes for 1,859 yards and 31 receiving touchdowns, (of which 3 receptions and 14 receiving yards were in the NFL).

== Coaching career ==
After his professional football career, Pyatt returned to his alma mater, Arvada West High School in Colorado, where he served as head football coach in 2014. He is the school’s seventh coach in 50 years. In 2024, he led the Wildcats to their first playoff win since 2018, defeating Fort Collins 59–29 in the opening round of the Class 5A state tournament.

Pyatt played for legendary Arvada West coach Dave Logan and has revived Logan’s coaching philosophies to train his team with the traditions and legacies of previous teams from the late 1990s.

As a coach, Pyatt draws from his experience as a player in the NFL and AFL where he played for Pro Football Hall of Fame coach Tony Dungy, quarterback Peyton Manning, General Manager Bill Polian of the Indianapolis Colts, and Pro Football Hall of Fame quarterback and Colorado Crush owner, John Elway. Pyatt specifically credits Manning and Dungy with teaching him about leadership, preparation, and how to treat people on and off the field.

During his tenure, he focused on rebuilding the football program and developing student-athletes. In 2020 he received regional recognition as Coach of the Year.

== Business career ==
=== MusclePharm ===
Pyatt founded MusclePharm, a sports nutrition company, in 2008 and served as its chief executive officer. Under his leadership, the company entered distribution partnerships with major retailers including GNC.

During Pyatt’s tenure, MusclePharm entered endorsement and promotional relationships with athletes and sports organizations, including golfer Tiger Woods and collaborations with Arnold Schwarzenegger, and became the official nutrition partner of the Ultimate Fighting Championship (UFC), Major League Baseball’s Cincinnati Reds, and European soccer’s Manchester City.

In September 2015, the U.S. Securities and Exchange Commission (SEC) charged MusclePharm and four individuals, including Pyatt, with committing a series of accounting and disclosure violations. The SEC's investigation found that MusclePharm omitted or understated nearly a half-million dollars’ worth of perks bestowed upon its executives, including approximately $244,000 paid to CEO Brad Pyatt related to automobiles, apparel, meals, golf club memberships, and his personal tax and legal services. MusclePharm and the four individuals settled the cases without admitting or denying the SEC’s findings. MusclePharm agreed to pay a $700,000 penalty and hire an independent monitor for one year among other undertakings. Pyatt agreed to pay a $150,000 penalty.

After serving as MusclePharm’s president and CEO for 8 years, Pyatt resigned from the company in March 2016. His severance included $1.1 million cash.

=== TRUBAR ===
Pyatt later co-founded TRUBAR, a plant-based protein bar brand, with his wife Stephanie Pyatt. According to reports, TRUBAR was acquired by Turkish company ETİ Gıda for C$201 million in 2025.

=== IQ Pouch ===
In 2026, Pyatt launched IQ Pouch, a cognitive performance supplement brand.
