= Jim Nelson (American football) =

American football player (born 1975)

No. 50, 57, 56
- Position: Linebacker

Personal information
- Born: April 16, 1975 (age 51); Riverside, California, U.S.
- Listed height: 6 ft 1 in (1.85 m)
- Listed weight: 234 lb (106 kg)

Career information
- High school: McDonogh School (MD)
- College: Penn State
- NFL draft: 1998: undrafted

Career history
- San Francisco 49ers (1998)*; Green Bay Packers (1998–1999); Minnesota Vikings (2000–2002); Indianapolis Colts (2003–2004); Baltimore Ravens (2005)
- * Offseason or practice squad member only

Career NFL statistics
- Tackles: 196
- Interceptions: 4
- Fumble recoveries: 5
- Stats at Pro Football Reference

James Robert Nelson (born April 16, 1975) is an American former professional football player who was a linebacker in the National Football League (NFL). He played college football for the Penn State Nittany Lions before playing in the NFL for the Green Bay Packers, Minnesota Vikings, Indianapolis Colts, and Baltimore Ravens.
