= Makoa Freitas =

American football player (born 1979)

No. 76
- Position: Offensive tackle

Personal information
- Born: November 23, 1979 (age 46); Honolulu, Hawaii, U.S.
- Listed height: 6 ft 4 in (1.93 m)
- Listed weight: 300 lb (136 kg)

Career information
- High school: Kamehameha-Kapalama (Honolulu)
- College: Arizona
- NFL draft: 2003: 6th round, 208th overall pick

Career history

Playing
- Indianapolis Colts (2003–2005)

Coaching
- Kahuku HS (2017) Interim head coach

Awards and highlights
- Second-team All-Pac-10 (2002)

Career NFL statistics
- Games played: 28
- Games started: 6
- Stats at Pro Football Reference

Rockne Makoa Freitas (born November 23, 1979) is an American former professional football player who was an offensive lineman in the National Football League (NFL). He played college football for the Arizona Wildcats. He is the son of former NFL player Rocky Freitas.

== Early life ==
Freitas attended Kamehameha High School. He earned PrepStar All-America honors, also he was selected to the Western 100 honors from the Tacoma News Tribune. He also was selected to the first-team all-state honors by the Honolulu Star-Bulletin during high school.

== College career ==
He played college football at the University of Arizona. He was honorable mention All-Pac-10 during his tenure at Arizona.

== Professional career ==
In April 2003, he was selected by the Indianapolis Colts in the sixth round (208th overall) of the 2003 NFL draft. He was waived on August 31, 2003, and signed to the practice squad on September 2. He was promoted to the active roster on September 27 and played in 12 games, starting six, during the 2003 season.

Freitas played in 16 games, no starts, for the Colts in 2004. He was placed on injured reserve on September 3, 2005. He was waived by the Colts on July 28, 2006.

== Coaching career ==
Freitas was named the interim head coach for the varsity football team at Kahuku High & Intermediate School in 2017 after head coach Vavae Tata was let go. He led the Red Raiders to an 11–2 record and an OIA championship before losing to Saint Louis in the Open Division title game. Despite his success, he was replaced by the junior varsity head coach, Sterling Carvalho. He is currently an offensive assistant for the junior varsity football team at Kahuku High School.

== Personal life ==
Freitas is currently a comptroller at Brigham Young University and is an accountant by trade.
