= Nick Harper (gridiron football) =

American gridiron football player (born 1974)

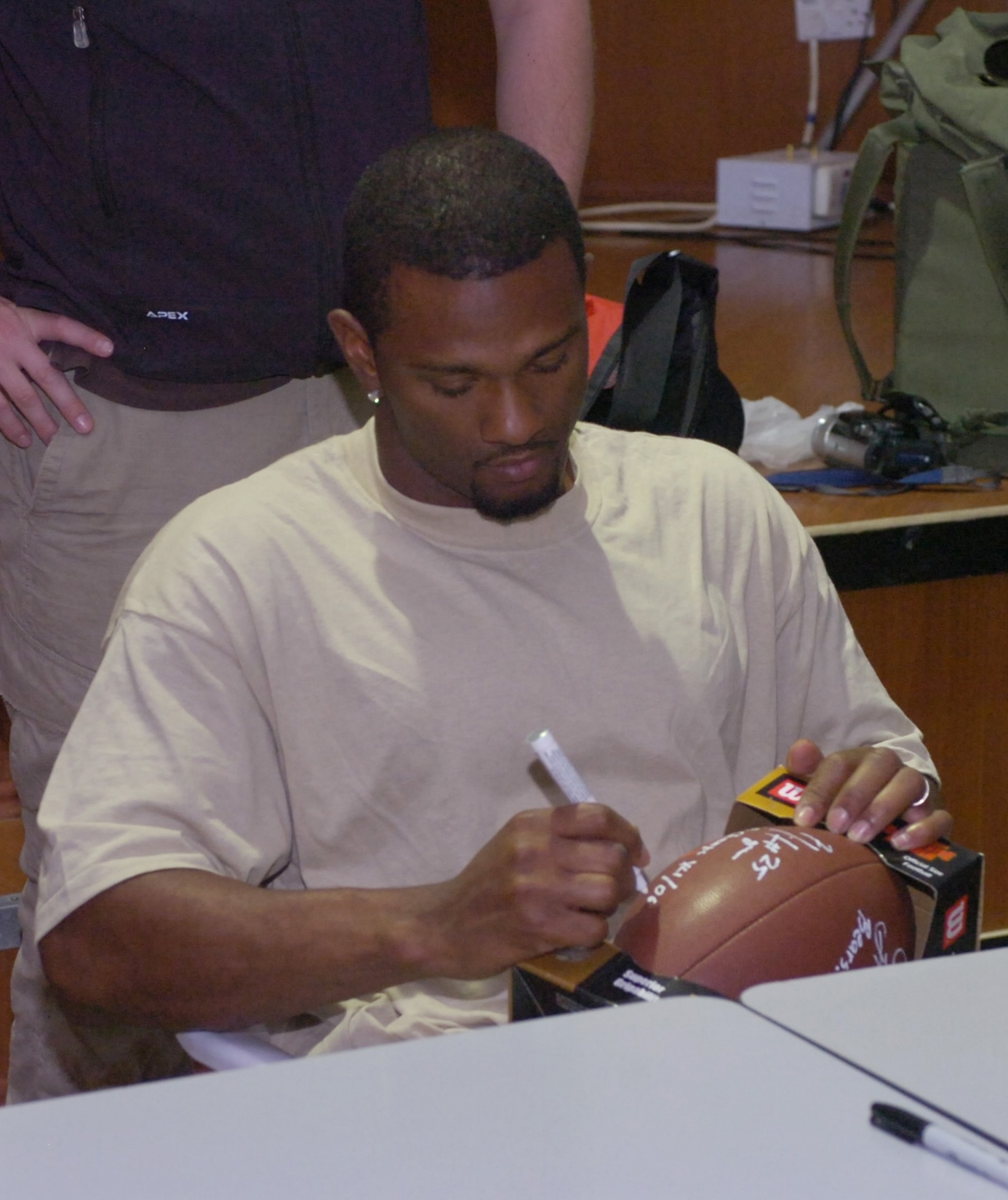

No. 25, 20
- Position: Cornerback

Personal information
- Born: September 10, 1974 (age 52); Milledgeville, Georgia, U.S.
- Listed height: 5 ft 10 in (1.78 m)
- Listed weight: 182 lb (83 kg)

Career information
- High school: Baldwin (GA)
- College: Fort Valley State
- NFL draft: 2001: undrafted

Career history
- Hamilton Tiger-Cats (2000); Indianapolis Colts (2001–2006); Tennessee Titans (2007–2009)

Awards and highlights
- Super Bowl champion (XLI); All-SIAC (1999)

Career NFL statistics
- Total tackles: 626
- Forced fumbles: 2
- Fumble recoveries: 5
- Pass deflections: 90
- Interceptions: 21
- Defensive touchdowns: 1
- Stats at Pro Football Reference

Nicholas Necosi Harper (born September 10, 1974) is an American former professional football player who was a cornerback in the National Football League (NFL). He was signed by the Hamilton Tiger-Cats as a street free agent in 2000. He played college football for the Fort Valley State Wildcats.

Harper played for the Indianapolis Colts and Tennessee Titans. He earned a Super Bowl ring with the Colts in Super Bowl XLI.

== Early life ==
Harper attended Baldwin High School and was a letterman in football, wrestling, baseball, and track & field. In football, as a senior, he won first-team All-Conference honors and was named the team MVP.

== College career ==
Harper played college football at Fort Valley State University in Fort Valley, Georgia.

== Professional career ==
=== Hamilton Tiger-Cats ===
After being declared ineligible for his senior season at Fort Valley State in 2000, Harper signed with the Hamilton Tiger-Cats of the Canadian Football League and appeared in 18 games for the team.

=== Indianapolis Colts ===
Harper signed with the Indianapolis Colts on January 16, 2001.

In 2005, the Colts finished first in the AFC with a 14–2 record. On January 14, 2006, the day before the divisional round of the playoffs against the Pittsburgh Steelers, Harper was involved in an altercation with his wife Daniell that resulted in him getting cut with a knife in his right leg, requiring three stitches. The Harpers asserted the incident was accidental, and Daniell did not face charges. With under two minutes remaining in the game and trailing 21–18, Harper picked up a Jerome Bettis fumble near the Indianapolis goal line and returned it to their 43-yard line before getting tackled by Steelers' quarterback Ben Roethlisberger. Colts commentators and teammates said had Harper returned the football along the sideline instead of the middle of the field, or had his leg been fully healthy, the Colts would have won the game. Indianapolis would end up missing the potential game-tying field goal, and Pittsburgh went on to win Super Bowl XL. In a 2016 retrospective on the game, The Indianapolis Star described Harper being tackled as the "play that cost the Colts a Super Bowl".

The following season, the Colts won Super Bowl XLI, giving Harper his first and only Super Bowl ring.

=== Tennessee Titans ===
Before the 2007 season, Harper signed a 3-year deal with the Tennessee Titans as a free agent. Harper played in and started 14 games and registered 80 tackles, three interceptions, 14 passes defensed, a forced fumble and a fumble recovery in his first season with the Titans.

In 2008, Harper finished second on the team with 17 passes defensed.

== NFL career statistics ==
Legend
**Bold**	Career high

=== Regular season ===
Year	Team	Games		Tackles					Interceptions					Fumbles			
Year	Team	GP	GS	Cmb	Solo	Ast	Sck	TFL	Int	Yds	TD	Lng	PD	FF	FR	Yds	TD
2001	IND	13	2	32	25	7	0.0	0	2	17	0	14	8	0	1	0	0
2002	IND	**16**	1	49	43	6	0.0	0	0	0	0	0	5	0	0	0	0
2003	IND	**16**	13	**97**	**83**	14	0.0	**7**	**4**	**121**	**1**	**75**	14	0	0	0	0
2004	IND	14	14	77	58	**19**	0.0	1	3	12	0	12	8	0	1	**15**	0
2005	IND	15	**15**	66	60	6	0.0	2	3	41	0	21	**15**	0	1	7	0
2006	IND	15	**15**	75	58	17	0.0	2	3	18	0	19	9	0	0	0	0
2007	TEN	14	14	78	64	14	0.0	3	3	62	0	32	11	**1**	**2**	0	0
2008	TEN	13	13	71	68	3	0.0	1	2	11	0	11	14	**1**	0	0	0
2009	TEN	11	11	81	69	12	0.0	2	1	4	0	4	6	0	0	0	0
		127	98	626	528	98	0.0	18	21	286	1	75	90	2	5	22	0

=== Playoffs ===
Year	Team	Games		Tackles					Interceptions					Fumbles			
Year	Team	GP	GS	Cmb	Solo	Ast	Sck	TFL	Int	Yds	TD	Lng	PD	FF	FR	Yds	TD
2002	IND	1	0	6	4	**2**	0.0	0	0	0	0	0	0	0	0	0	0
2003	IND	3	0	11	9	**2**	0.0	0	0	0	0	0	**2**	**1**	0	0	0
2004	IND	2	2	5	5	0	0.0	**1**	0	0	0	0	1	0	0	0	0
2005	IND	1	1	9	9	0	0.0	0	0	0	0	0	1	0	**1**	**35**	0
2006	IND	**4**	**4**	**14**	**13**	1	0.0	0	**1**	**9**	0	**9**	**2**	**1**	0	0	0
2007	TEN	1	1	0	0	0	0.0	0	0	0	0	0	0	0	0	0	0
2008	TEN	1	1	3	3	0	0.0	0	0	0	0	0	1	0	0	0	0
		13	9	48	43	5	0.0	1	1	9	0	9	7	2	1	35	0
