= Keyon Whiteside =

American football player (born 1980)

No. 52
- Position: Linebacker

Personal information
- Born: January 31, 1980 (age 46); Forest City, North Carolina, U.S.
- Listed height: 6 ft 0 in (1.83 m)
- Listed weight: 229 lb (104 kg)

Career information
- High school: Chase (Forest City)
- College: Tennessee
- NFL draft: 2003: 5th round, 162nd overall pick

Career history
- Indianapolis Colts (2003)*; Cincinnati Bengals (2003); Indianapolis Colts (2003–2005)
- * Offseason or practice squad member only

Awards and highlights
- BCS national champion (1998)

Career NFL statistics
- Games played: 12
- Games started: 0
- Tackles: 4
- Stats at Pro Football Reference

Keyon Shontel Whiteside (born January 31, 1980) is an American former professional football player who was a linebacker in the National Football League (NFL). He played college football for the Tennessee Volunteers and was selected by the Indianapolis Colts in the fifth round of the 2003 NFL draft.

== Early life and college ==
Whiteside participated in football, basketball and track at Chase High School in Forest City, North Carolina. He was inducted into the Rutherford County Sports Hall of Fame in 2018.

He played college football at the University of Tennessee from 1998 to 2002. He was redshirted in 1998, and was part of the Volunteers team that won the 1998 national championship.

== Professional career ==
Whiteside was selected by the Indianapolis Colts in the fifth round, with the 162nd overall pick, of the 2003 NFL draft. He played two seasons for the Colts. He officially signed with the team on July 24, 2003. He was waived on August 31, 2003.

Whiteside was claimed off waivers by the Cincinnati Bengals on September 1, 2003. He was waived by the Bengals on October 22, 2003.

Whiteside was signed to the practice squad of the Colts on October 27, 2003. He was promoted to the active roster on November 19 and played in five games for the Colts during the 2003 season, recording one solo tackle and one assisted tackle. Whiteside appeared in seven games for the Colts in 2004, totaling two solo tackles. He was placed on injured reserve on November 11, 2004. He was placed on the physically unable to perform list on June 14, 2005. Whiteside was waived by the Colts on July 28, 2006.
