= Manning family =

Prominent family in American football

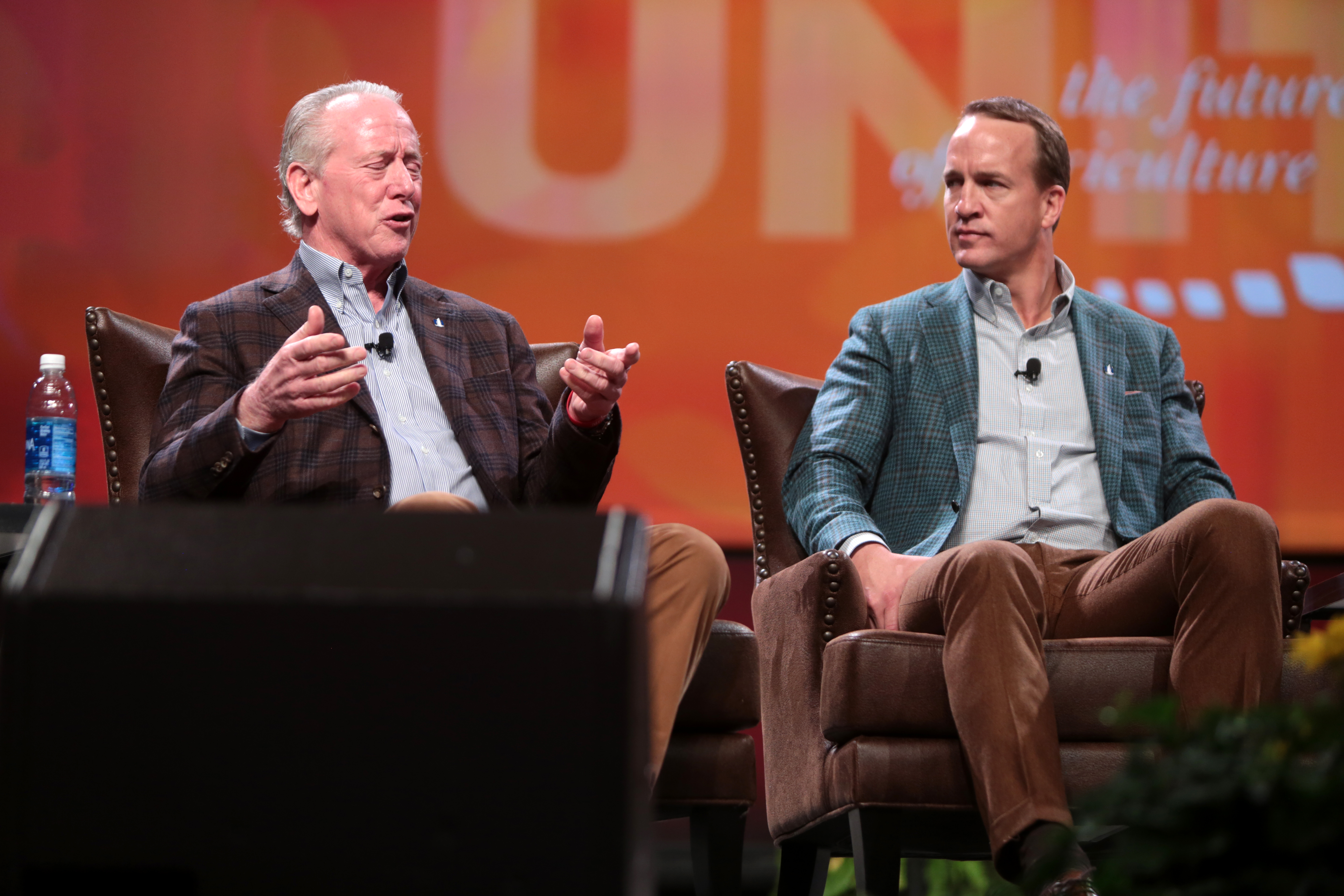
Archie Manning and his son Peyton

The Mannings are an American family who have gained fame via numerous family members playing American football (specifically the position of quarterback) and are considered to be a dynasty within the sport. Archie Manning from Mississippi was the first Manning to play in the National Football League (NFL), spending the majority of his career playing for the New Orleans Saints based in New Orleans, Louisiana. The Manning family has since resided in Louisiana.

Three members of the Manning family – Archie, Peyton, and Eli – have had successful collegiate and professional football careers playing collegiately in the National Collegiate Athletic Association (NCAA), specifically in the Southeastern Conference (SEC), and professionally in the National Football League (NFL). The Mannings' football awards include two College Football Hall of Fame inductions, three SEC player of the year awards, 20 cumulative Pro Bowl selections, seven first-team All-Pro selections, five NFL MVP awards, six Super Bowl appearances, four Super Bowl victories, three Super Bowl MVP awards, five ESPY Awards, and one Pro Football Hall of Fame induction. Two members went on into the field of sports broadcasting after their retirement from football and have four Sports Emmy Awards. In 2023, Archie, Cooper, Peyton, and Eli were inducted into the National High School Football Hall of Fame as part of its inaugural class.

Arch Manning – Archie's grandson, son of Cooper and nephew of Peyton and Eli – became the third generation of Mannings to play quarterback in the SEC as a member of the Texas Longhorns. He started his first game in 2024 (the Longhorns' first season in the SEC after moving from the Big 12 Conference).

== History ==
=== First generation ===
- Archie played collegiately for Ole Miss, and professionally for the New Orleans Saints, Houston Oilers, and the Minnesota Vikings. He is a two-time Pro Bowl selection, a first team All-American, and an inductee in the College Football Hall of Fame.

=== Second generation ===
Archie's three sons have played football to varying degrees:

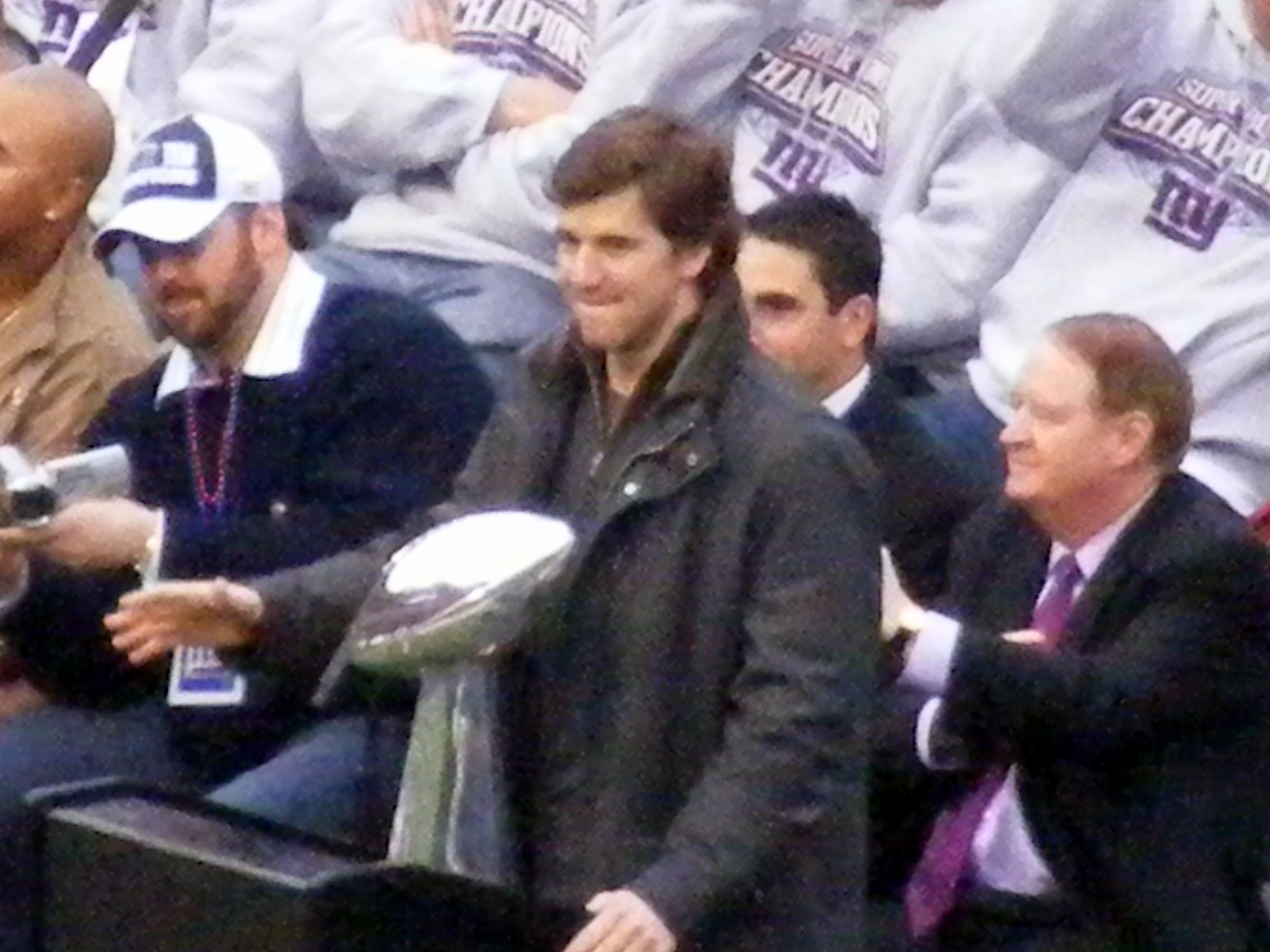
Eli Manning standing behind the Lombardi Trophy, making a speech at the rally celebrating the Giants win in Super Bowl XLII. Combined, Eli and older brother Peyton have won four Super Bowls (two each).

- Cooper played football in high school as a wide receiver and committed to play at his father's alma mater of Ole Miss, but was forced to stop playing after being diagnosed with spinal stenosis while still in high school.
- Peyton played collegiately at Tennessee, where he was a consensus All-American, and professionally for the Indianapolis Colts and the Denver Broncos, making two Super Bowl appearances with each team and winning one Super Bowl with each team. He is a five-time NFL MVP, MVP of Super Bowl XLI, a 14-time Pro Bowl selection, an inductee in both the College Football and Pro Football Hall of Fame, and has five ESPY Awards (three for Best NFL Player, one for Best Championship Performance, and one for Outstanding Team with the Colts in 2007).
- Eli played collegiately at Ole Miss and professionally for the New York Giants, winning two Super Bowls (along with two Super Bowl MVPs), and is a four-time Pro Bowl selection.

=== Third generation ===
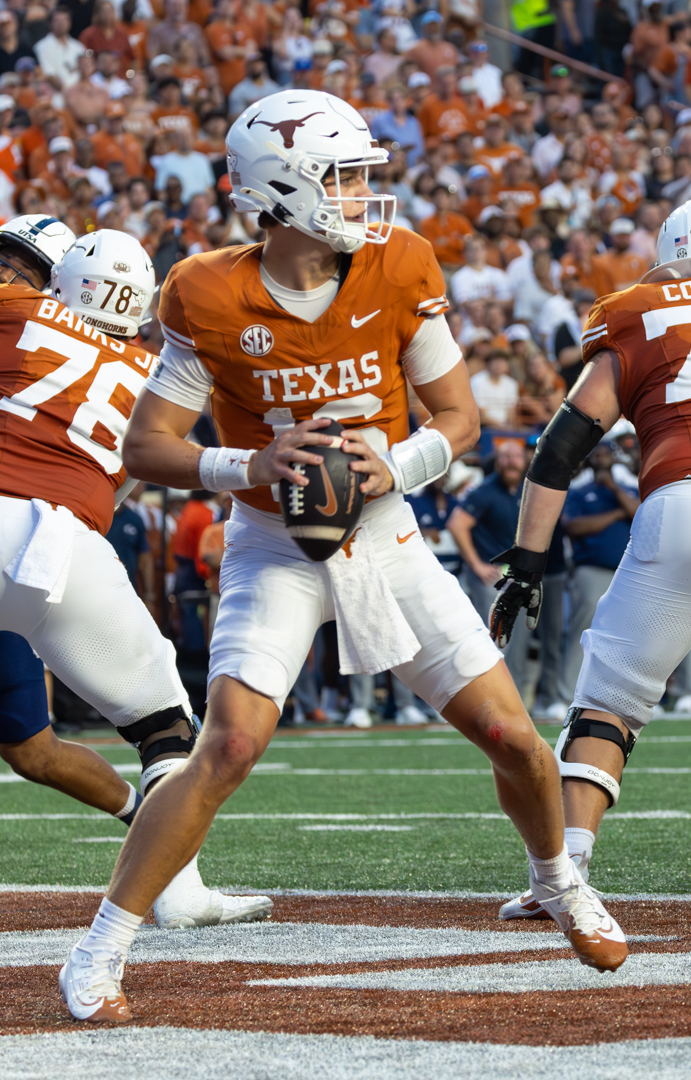
Arch Manning, the third generation of the Manning family to play quarterback in the SEC as a member of the Texas Longhorns

- Arch, the oldest son of Cooper, is a collegiate QB for the Texas Longhorns. After only playing in brief spot duty as a true freshman in 2023, he made his first start in 2024 as a redshirt freshman (which was also the first season for Texas as a member of the SEC after moving from the Big XII, making him the third generation of Mannings to play quarterback in the SEC).

== Manning Bowl ==
Peyton and Eli Manning played against each other three times in the regular season during their professional careers. These encounters were colloquially dubbed the "Manning Bowl", and Peyton's teams, twice with the Colts and once with the Broncos, held a 3–0 record over Eli and the New York Giants. The first Manning Bowl was held on September 10, 2006, and Peyton's Colts defeated Eli's Giants by a score of 26–21. In NBC’s first Sunday Night Football broadcast in its history, the game was introduced by Al Michaels as “In 87 seasons in the National Football League, counting this afternoon, 12,183 games have been played. Never has a brother started against a brother at quarterback”. The second Manning Bowl was held on September 19, 2010, with Peyton and the Colts beating Eli's Giants again by a score of 38–14. The third and final Manning Bowl was held on September 15, 2013, and Peyton and the Broncos beat Eli's Giants 41–23. They faced each other in two Pro Bowls, in 2009 and 2013, both won by the NFC. However, they never faced each other in the playoffs as both always played in separate conferences and never made the Super Bowl at the same time.

Additionally, each quarterback coincidentally played in a Super Bowl held at his brother's home stadium; in February 2012, Eli’s Giants defeated the New England Patriots in Super Bowl XLVI at Lucas Oil Stadium, Peyton's home stadium with Indianapolis. Two years later in February 2014, Peyton’s Broncos lost to the Seattle Seahawks in Super Bowl XLVIII at MetLife Stadium, Eli's home stadium with New York.

== Family tree ==
Archie (born 1949)
  - Cooper (born 1974)
    - May (born 2002)
    - Arch (born 2004)
    - Heid (born 2006)
  - Peyton (born 1976)
    - Marshall (born 2011)
    - Mosley (born 2011)
  - Eli (born 1981)
    - Ava (born 2011)
    - Lucy (born 2013)
    - Caroline (born 2015)
    - Charles (born 2018)
