= Peyton Manning =

American football player (born 1976)

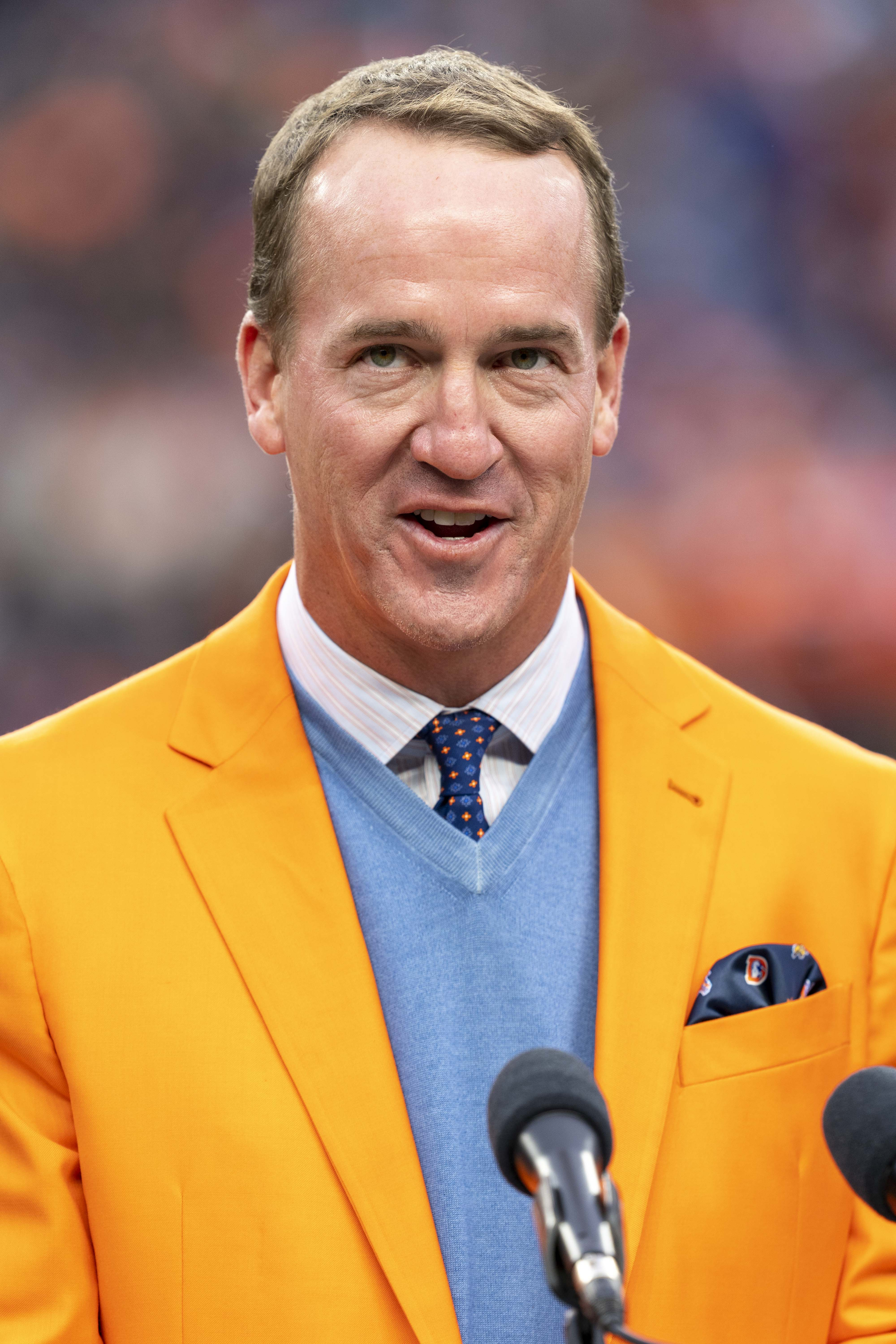
- Manning in Denver in 2021

No. 18
- Position: Quarterback

Personal information
- Born: March 24, 1976 (age 50); New Orleans, Louisiana, U.S.
- Listed height: 6 ft 5 in (1.96 m)
- Listed weight: 230 lb (104 kg)

Career information
- High school: Isidore Newman (New Orleans)
- College: Tennessee (1994–1997)
- NFL draft: 1998: 1st round, 1st overall pick

Career history
- Indianapolis Colts (1998–2011); Denver Broncos (2012–2015)

Awards and highlights
- 2× Super Bowl champion (XLI, 50); Super Bowl MVP (XLI); 5× NFL Most Valuable Player (2003, (Note: Co-winner with Steve McNair.) 2004, 2008, 2009, 2013); 2× NFL Offensive Player of the Year (2004, 2013); NFL Comeback Player of the Year (2012); Walter Payton NFL Man of the Year (2005); 7× First-team All-Pro (2003–2005, 2008, 2009, 2012, 2013); 3× Second-team All-Pro (1999, 2000, 2006); 14× Pro Bowl (1999, 2000, 2002–2010, 2012–2014); 3× NFL passing yards leader (2000, 2003, 2013); 4× NFL passing touchdowns leader (2000, 2004, 2006, 2013); 3× NFL passer rating leader (2004–2006); 2× NFL completion percentage leader (2003, 2012); NFL 2000s All-Decade Team; NFL 100th Anniversary All-Time Team; SI Sportsman of the Year (2013); Indianapolis Colts Ring of Honor; Indianapolis Colts No. 18 retired; Denver Broncos Ring of Fame; Denver Broncos No. 18 honored; Consensus All-American (1997); 2× Third-team All-American (1995, 1996); SEC Male Athlete of the Year (1998); Tennessee Volunteers No. 16 retired; NFL records: Most passing touchdowns in a season: 55 (2013); Most passing yards in a season: 5,477 (2013); Most touchdown passes in a game: 7 (tied); Games with a perfect passer rating: 4 (tied) (Note: With Lamar Jackson); Most MVP awards won (5)

Career NFL statistics
- Passing attempts: 9,380
- Passing completions: 6,125
- Completion percentage: 65.3%
- TD–INT: 539–251
- Passing yards: 71,940
- Passer rating: 96.5
- Stats at Pro Football Reference
- Pro Football Hall of Fame
- College Football Hall of Fame

Peyton Williams Manning (born March 24, 1976) is an American former professional football quarterback who played in the National Football League (NFL) for 18 seasons. Nicknamed "the Sheriff", he spent 14 seasons with the Indianapolis Colts and four with the Denver Broncos. Manning is considered one of the greatest quarterbacks of all time. A member of the Manning football dynasty, he is the second son of former NFL quarterback Archie Manning, older brother of former NFL quarterback Eli Manning, and uncle of Texas Longhorns quarterback Arch Manning. He played college football for the Tennessee Volunteers, winning the Maxwell, Davey O'Brien, and Johnny Unitas Golden Arm awards in 1997 en route to victory in the 1997 SEC Championship Game.

Manning was selected first overall in the 1998 NFL draft by the Colts and served as their starting quarterback from 1998 to 2010. He helped transform the struggling Colts franchise into consistent playoff contenders, leading them to 11 playoff appearances, eight division titles, three AFC Championship Games, two Super Bowl appearances, and one championship title in Super Bowl XLI, the franchise's first in over three decades and first since relocating to Indianapolis. Manning was also named Super Bowl MVP in the victory. After undergoing neck surgery that sidelined him for the 2011 season, Manning was released by the Colts and signed with the Broncos. Serving as the Broncos' starting quarterback from 2012 to 2015, he helped them clinch their division each season and reach two Super Bowls. Manning's career ended with a victory in Super Bowl 50, making him the first starting quarterback to win the Super Bowl for more than one franchise.

Manning holds many NFL records, including most MVP awards, quarterback first-team All-Pro selections, 4,000-yard passing seasons, single-season passing yards, and single-season passing touchdowns. He is also third in career passing yards and career passing touchdowns. Helping lead both the Colts and Broncos to two Super Bowl appearances each, Manning is the only quarterback with multiple Super Bowl starts for different franchises. He was inducted to the Pro Football Hall of Fame in 2021 and the College Football Hall of Fame in 2017.

== Early life ==
Peyton Williams Manning went to Isidore Newman School in New Orleans, Louisiana, where he led the Greenies football team to a 34–5 record during his three seasons as the starter. He passed for 7,207 yards and 92 touchdowns and rushed for 13 touchdowns while leading the Greenies to the postseason all three years. He was named Mr. Football USA, Gatorade Circle of Champions National Player-of-the-Year, and Columbus (Ohio) Touchdown Club National Offensive Player-of-the-Year in 1993. While at Newman, he began wearing the #18 jersey in honor of his older brother Cooper, who had to give up football due to spinal stenosis. Younger brother Eli also wore the number when he became starting quarterback. Newman has since retired the #18 jersey and it can be seen hanging in the school gym. Manning was among the most sought-after high school players in the country and was recruited by about 60 colleges, including Florida, Florida State, LSU, Michigan, Tennessee, Texas, Texas A&M, and his father's alma mater Ole Miss. While in high school, Manning played basketball and baseball in addition to football.

== College career ==
Eight days before signing day, Manning chose to play college football for the University of Tennessee Volunteers under head coach Phillip Fulmer. Many fans were surprised that he did not pick the Ole Miss Rebels, for whom his father Archie played and older brother Cooper committed to, with his parents receiving many angry phone calls and letters. He became Tennessee's all-time leading passer with 11,201 yards and 89 touchdowns and won 39 of 45 games as a starter, breaking the Southeastern Conference (SEC) record for career wins.

=== 1994 season ===
As a freshman, Manning began the season as the third-string quarterback. In the season opener against UCLA, he was one of three quarterbacks to come off the bench after starter Jerry Colquitt suffered a season-ending injury on the seventh play of the game. However, he was not able to generate any offense, only handing the ball off three times, and was pulled from the game. Two weeks later, in a 31–0 loss to the #1 Florida Gators, Manning completed his first collegiate pass. During the season's fourth game, against Mississippi State, starter Todd Helton got injured and he took over. The Vols lost 24–21, but Manning threw his first two collegiate touchdowns in the game. He was named the team's starter and remained so for the rest of his college career. In his first start, the following week against Washington State, the Vols won 10–9. They won all but one of their remaining games, finishing the season 8–4 with a 45–23 victory over Virginia Tech in the 1994 Gator Bowl. He finished his first collegiate season 89 of 144 for 1,141 passing yards, 11 touchdowns, and six interceptions.

=== 1995 season ===
Manning and the Vols opened the 1995 season with victories over East Carolina and SEC rival Georgia before traveling to Gainesville to face the Florida rival Gators. Against Florida, Manning threw 326 yards and two touchdowns, leading the Vols to a 30–21 halftime lead. However, the Gators outscored the Vols 41–7 in the second half, winning 62–37. This was the Vols' only loss of the season, as they won their remaining eight regular season games, including a 41–14 win over rival Alabama, where Manning connected with wide receiver Joey Kent for a 80-yard touchdown on the Vols' first offensive play. The Vols defeated Ohio State by a score of 20–14 in the Citrus Bowl. The Vols ended the season ranked third, and he came in sixth place in Heisman Trophy voting. He finished his sophomore season 244 of 380 for 2,954 passing yards, 22 touchdowns, and four interceptions.

=== 1996 season ===
The Vols opened the 1996 season ranked No. 2 behind Nebraska. However, after winning their first two games against UNLV and UCLA, the Vols again lost to Florida by a score of 35–29, with Manning throwing four interceptions. The Vols almost made a historic comeback on the Gators in the game, rallying the score to 35–29 before falling short. After winning their next four games, the Vols were defeated by Memphis, even though Manning threw 296 yards. The Vols won the rest of their games, including a 48–28 win in the Citrus Bowl over Northwestern, a game in which Manning threw 408 yards and four touchdowns; he was named the game's MVP. His 243 pass completions and 63.9% completion percentage led the SEC that year. He finished the 1996 season with 3,287 passing yards, 20 touchdowns, and 12 interceptions. He also came in eighth place in Heisman Trophy voting. Manning completed his degree in three years, a Bachelor of Arts in speech communication. He was predicted to be the top overall pick in the NFL draft, but announced his decision to stay at Tennessee for his senior year in an event at Thompson-Boling Arena.

==== Sexual assault allegation ====
In 1996, while attending the University of Tennessee, Manning was accused of sexual assault by trainer Jamie Ann Naughright after she alleged that he pressed his genitals against her face during a foot examination. Manning said that he was pulling a prank by "mooning" Malcolm Saxon, a cross country runner who was in the room as Naughright bent over to examine him. Saxon initially supported Manning's story before stating in an affidavit and a written letter to Manning that Manning had intentionally exposed himself to Naughright, but did not mention witnessing any physical contact during the incident. Naughright settled with the university for $300,000 for its alleged failure in four incidents and resigned from the school. She also made a list of 33 complaints about the school. Naughright filed a defamation lawsuit against Manning and three other parties in 2002, claiming that Manning defamed her in a book he wrote with his father and author John Underwood in which he described her as having a "vulgar mouth". The lawsuit was settled after the court ruled there was sufficient evidence for it to be heard by a jury. Terms of the settlement were not disclosed due to confidentiality terms.

=== 1997 season ===
In his senior season, Manning and the Vols opened the season with victories against Texas Tech and UCLA, but for the third time in his career, Manning fell to Florida 33–20. The Vols won the rest of their regular season games, finishing 10–1, and advanced to the SEC Championship game against Auburn. Down 20–7 in the second quarter, Manning led the Vols to a 30–29 comeback victory. Throwing 373 yards and four touchdowns, he was named the game's MVP, but injured himself in the process. The #3 Vols were matched-up with #2 Nebraska in the Orange Bowl; if Tennessee won and top-ranked Michigan lost to Washington State in the Rose Bowl, the Vols would have won the national championship. However, the Vols' defense could not stop Nebraska's rushing attack, giving up over 400 rushing yards in a 42–17 loss.

As a senior, Manning won many awards; he was a consensus first-team All-American, SEC Player of the Year, the Maxwell Award winner, the Davey O'Brien Award winner, the Johnny Unitas Award winner, and the Best College Player ESPY award winner, among others. He finished as the runner-up to Charles Woodson in the 1997 Heisman Trophy voting. He became the fourth player in school history to finish as the runner-up. In 2005, Tennessee retired Manning's number (16). One of the streets leading to Neyland Stadium was renamed to Peyton Manning Pass. Manning finished his final season at Tennessee with 3,819 passing yards, 36 touchdowns, and 11 interceptions. While at the University of Tennessee, Manning excelled academically and was elected to the Omicron Delta Kappa and Phi Beta Kappa society in 1997. He also received the National Football Foundation National Scholar-Athlete Award.

=== Post-collegiate honors ===
Manning was inducted into the Tennessee Athletics Hall of Fame in 2016. He was also named the 2016 Tennessean of the Year by the Tennessee Sports Hall of Fame. Manning was elected to the College Football Hall of Fame in 2017, his first year of eligibility for the honor, and was inducted during a ceremony in December. He joined his father Archie in the Hall of Fame, making them the first father and son duo to both be inducted as players.

== Professional career ==
Pre-draft measurables
Height	Weight	Arm length	Hand span	40-yard dash	Wonderlic
6 ft 5 1/4 in (1.96 m)	230 lb (104 kg)	31 1/2 in (0.80 m)	10 1/8 in (0.26 m)	4.80 s	28
All values from NFL Combine

=== Overview ===
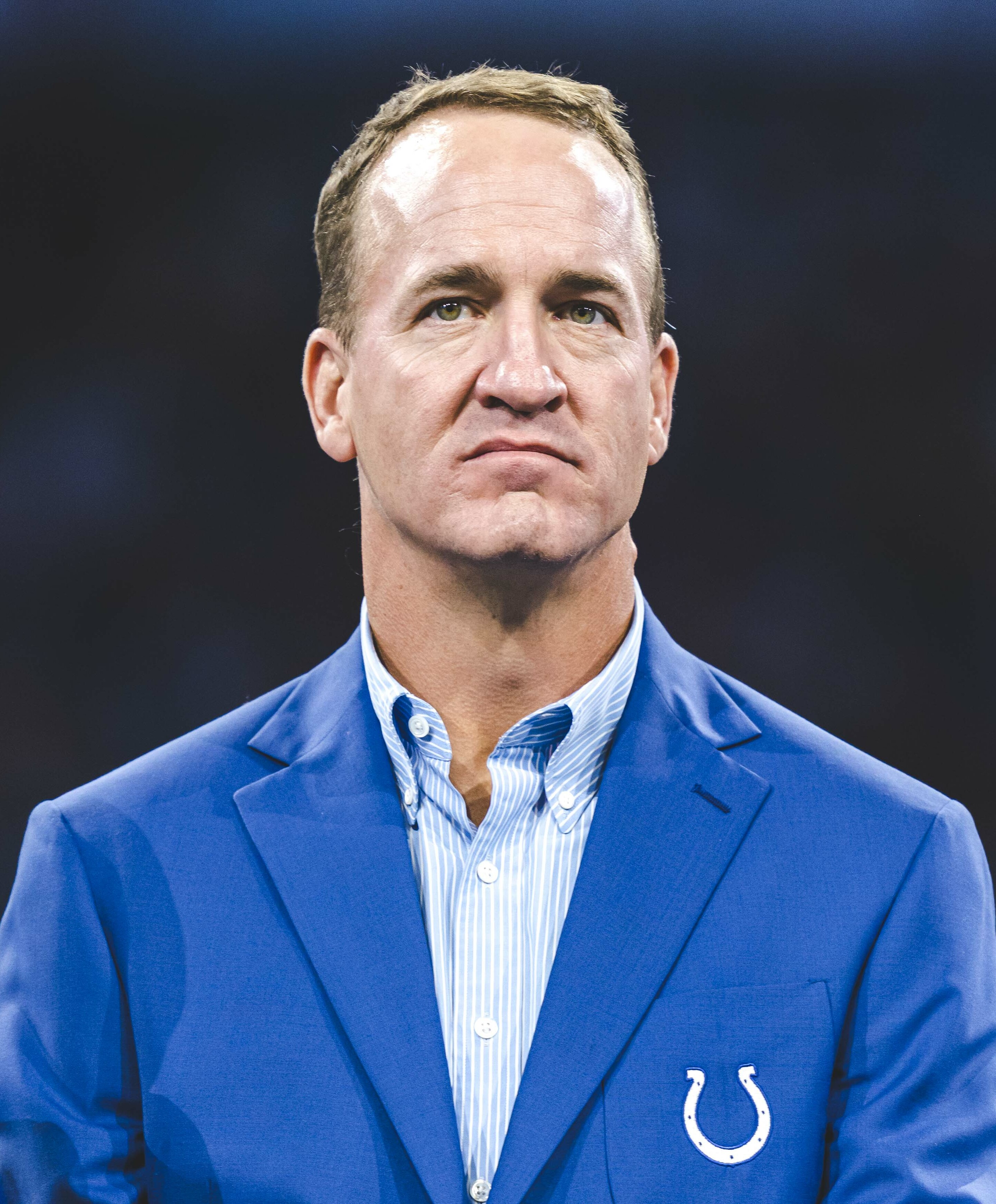
Manning (pictured in 2022) was inducted into the Colts' Ring of Honor in 2017

Manning was selected by the Indianapolis Colts as the first overall pick in the 1998 NFL draft. He became the second player in Tennessee's school history to be drafted #1 overall, the first since George Cafego in the 1940 NFL draft. He started as a rookie and went on to play for the Colts for 13 full seasons before being sidelined by a neck injury, which cost him the entire 2011 season. After recovering from the injury, he was released by the Colts and joined the Denver Broncos for whom he played from the 2012 season to the 2015 season. Excluding the year lost to the neck injury, Manning played in 17 NFL seasons.

Manning is considered to be one of the greatest NFL quarterbacks of all time. He was named the NFL's most valuable player a record five times (four times with the Colts, once with the Broncos), was named to the Pro Bowl 14 times, and named a first-team All-Pro seven times. As a starter up until the end of the 2015 season, he had a career winning percentage of .702 in the regular season. He held the NFL record for career touchdown passes from 2014 to 2019 and the career passing yards record from 2015 to 2018. Manning is also the only quarterback in NFL history to appear in four Super Bowls with a different head coach each time, playing under Tony Dungy, Jim Caldwell, John Fox, and Gary Kubiak when he reached the league's championship.

The most commonly cited criticism of Manning's professional career is that despite great success and impressive statistics during the regular season, he did not have similar levels of success in the postseason. His career postseason record as a starter was a more modest 14–13 compared to his 186–79 regular season record. However, Manning won two Super Bowls in Super Bowl XLI and Super Bowl 50 and was named MVP in the former. During the early part of Manning's career, commentators noted that "his record-breaking stats were written off because of the Colts' postseason failures." Conversely, Manning's final season in 2015 was statistically his weakest, but saw him end his career with a Super Bowl victory through the assistance of the Broncos' No Fly Zone defense.

=== Indianapolis Colts ===
==== 1998 season ====
Despite concerns about his arm strength and mobility, Manning was selected first overall in the 1998 NFL draft by the Indianapolis Colts. Although many considered Washington State quarterback Ryan Leaf to be his rival for the first selection in the draft, as Leaf had a higher quarterback rating, all six experts Sports Illustrated consulted believed that Manning was superior. Five said that they would take him first in the draft; Sid Gillman said about Manning, "this is a pro quarterback."

The Colts' scouts initially favored Leaf, but the team's management and coaches liked Manning's attitude, particularly as Manning showed up prepared to a scheduled interview meeting with the Colts' staff while Leaf arrived late. Colts general manager Bill Polian, who had the final say on the draft selection, recalled Manning saying "I'll leave you with this thought. If you take me, I promise you we will win a championship. If you don't, I promise I'll come back and kick your ass." Contrary to what he heard about their athletic ability, Polian said that Manning "far and away had the stronger arm, threw a tighter ball" than Leaf.

In Manning's rookie season under head coach Jim Mora, he threw 3,739 yards and 26 touchdowns, set five different NFL rookie records including most touchdown passes in a season and most interceptions in a rookie year, and was named to the NFL All-Rookie First Team. In his NFL debut, Manning was 21-of-37 for 302 passing yards, one touchdown, and three interceptions. He threw his first career touchdown, a six-yard pass to Marvin Harrison, in the fourth quarter of the 24–15 loss to the Miami Dolphins. Manning's first win came against fellow rookie Leaf, 17–12 over the San Diego Chargers in week 5. Two weeks later, Manning faced off against Steve Young; he threw three touchdowns, tying a Colts rookie record, but the San Francisco 49ers kicked a late field goal to win 34–31. In November against the New York Jets, Manning threw three touchdowns in a 24–23 win; he was named AFC Offensive Player of the Week for this performance. It was the first game-winning drive of Manning's career, as he threw the game-winning touchdown pass to Marcus Pollard. Manning was certainly a bright spot in 1998 for the Colts with 3,739 passing yards and 26 passing touchdowns, but also threw a league high 28 interceptions as the team struggled to a 3–13 record with a defense that gave up more than 27 points per game. The Colts lost many close games, including five games where they led by double digits at some point.

==== 1999 season ====
Manning and the Colts started the 1999 season splitting the first two games with the Buffalo Bills (31–14 win) and New England Patriots (31–28 loss). In week 3, against the San Diego Chargers, Manning threw over 404 yards, scored his first professional rushing touchdown, and was named AFC Offensive Player of the Week for his effort in the 27–19 victory. The Colts responded by winning 11 of their remaining 12 games, finishing 13–3 and the AFC East division. In week 11, against the Philadelphia Eagles, Manning threw a then career-high 80-yard touchdown pass to Terrence Wilkins in the 44–17 victory. The ten-game turnaround from the previous year set an NFL record. His seven game-winning drives were tied for the most in NFL history until Matthew Stafford had eight in the 2016 season. Manning finished the year with 4,135 passing yards and 26 passing touchdowns, and was named both Second-team All-Pro and to the Pro Bowl, both firsts for him. He finished third in the NFL in pass completions, passing yards, and passing touchdowns. As the second seed in the AFC, the Colts earned a first round bye and faced the Tennessee Titans in the Divisional Round of the playoffs. The Colts lost 19–16 to the Super Bowl-bound Titans and Manning was limited to 19-of-42 passing attempts for 227 passing yards and one touchdown run. In the Pro Bowl, he threw 270 yards and two touchdowns in the 51–31 loss.

==== 2000 season ====
The Colts started the season splitting two games with the Kansas City Chiefs (27–14 win) and Oakland Raiders (38–31 loss). The Colts responded with a Monday Night Football victory against the Jacksonville Jaguars, a 43–14 win in which Manning threw 430 yards and four touchdowns; Manning was named the AFC Offensive Player of the Week for this performance. The Colts won four of their next five games, including a 30–23 win against the New England Patriots in which Manning had the first perfect passer rating of his career, but then lost four of the five games following that. The Colts regained their momentum, winning their final three games, including a 31–10 win over the Minnesota Vikings in week 17. Manning threw four touchdowns in the win and was again named AFC Offensive Player of the Week. The win gave the Colts a 10–6 record as well as a Wild Card spot in the playoffs. He finished the season with league-highs across the board with 357 pass completions for 4,413 passing yards and 33 passing touchdowns, and was named Second-team All-Pro and to the Pro Bowl. In the Wild Card Round, the Colts lost to the Miami Dolphins 23–17 in overtime. Manning threw 194 yards and a touchdown in the loss.

==== 2001 season ====
Manning and the Colts introduced the no-huddle offense, and used it to great effect in a week 1 rout over the New York Jets, 45–24. Two weeks later, the Colts advanced to 2–0 with a 42–26 win over the Buffalo Bills, with Manning throwing 421 yards, four touchdowns, and two interceptions. He was named AFC Offensive Player of the Week for this game. However, the Colts lost the following week in a 38–17 loss to the New England Patriots, which was the first meeting between Manning and Tom Brady. The Colts continued their slide, losing their following two games. The Colts briefly rebounded, winning two games, but then lost seven of their last nine games. In the stretch, Manning threw a career-high 86-yard touchdown pass to Marcus Pollard in the 34–20 loss to the New Orleans Saints. After a 40–21 home loss to the San Francisco 49ers, in which Manning threw a career-high four interceptions in the game, coach Jim Mora uttered his famous "Playoffs? Don't talk about playoffs", at the press conference. Despite the 6–10 record, Manning finished the season with 4,131 passing yards, 26 passing touchdowns, and four rushing touchdowns as the offense produced the second most points in the league. However, the defense allowed the most points in the league and Mora was fired after the season.

==== 2002 season ====
Before the 2002 season, Tony Dungy became Manning's second head coach in the NFL. The Colts began the 2002 season with a 4–1 record before a three-game losing streak sent them to 4–4. The Colts responded by winning all but two of their remaining games, including a 35–13 victory over the Philadelphia Eagles in which Manning had a perfect passer rating for the second time in his career, giving them a 10–6 record and a spot in the playoffs. He finished the 2002 season with 4,200 passing yards and 27 passing touchdowns and was named to the Pro Bowl. The Colts were defeated by the New York Jets in the Wild Card Round, 41–0, with Manning passing for 137 yards and two interceptions, falling 0–3 in the playoffs to start his career.

==== 2003 season: First MVP ====
The most valuable player is the one that makes the most players valuable.

— ~ Peyton Manning

The 2003 Colts began the season 5–0, including a 55–21 blowout over the New Orleans Saints in which Manning recorded his third perfect passer rating game and threw six touchdown passes, earning him AFC Offensive Player of the Week honors. On Monday Night Football, against the defending champion Tampa Bay Buccaneers, the Colts trailed 35–14 in the final five minutes. After one short touchdown drive, the Colts recovered the onside kick. Manning threw a 28-yard touchdown pass to Marvin Harrison on 4th and 6 to make it 35–28. With 1:41 remaining, Manning got the ball back and drove the offense 85 yards for the game-tying touchdown. He set up the winning 29-yard field goal in overtime for a 38–35 win. It was the only time in NFL history a team won a game after trailing by 21 points in the final four minutes of regulation. Manning threw 386 yards in the game.

After an overtime loss to the Carolina Panthers in week 6, the Colts won all but three of their remaining games, finishing 12–4. On November 30, the Colts faced the 9–2 New England Patriots in what had a memorable ending in one of the NFL's top rivalries of the 2000s. The Colts trailed 31–10 late in the third quarter before Manning threw three touchdown passes in a span of six minutes to tie the game. Trailing 38–34 in the final minutes, the Colts had three plays at the one-yard line to try to score the winning touchdown. Running back Edgerrin James was stopped on fourth down by linebacker Willie McGinest and the Patriots won. In a week 14 win against the Atlanta Falcons, Manning threw five touchdowns and was named Offensive Player of the Week a second time. After the game, Manning was awarded Player of the Week honors for the third time that season. During the season, Manning was named the AFC Offensive Player of the Month for September and was named the AP NFL co-MVP along with Titans quarterback Steve McNair. Manning also received the ESPY Award for Best NFL Player. Manning led the league with 379 pass completions for 4,267 passing yards and threw 29 touchdowns; he was named first-team All-Pro and to the Pro Bowl.

In the Wild Card Round, Manning and the Colts defeated the Denver Broncos, 41–10, for his first playoff win. He threw 377 yards and five touchdowns in the game, earning him a perfect passer rating, his second of the season and the fourth of his career. In the Divisional Round, Manning led the Colts to a 38–31 win over the Kansas City Chiefs. In the victory, he threw 304 yards and three touchdowns. In the AFC Championship, Manning was shut down by the New England Patriots' top-ranked defense and posted the third-lowest passer rating of his career at 35.5. The Patriots' defense intercepted Manning four times and sacked him another four, as the Colts lost the game by a score of 24–14.

==== 2004 season: Second MVP ====
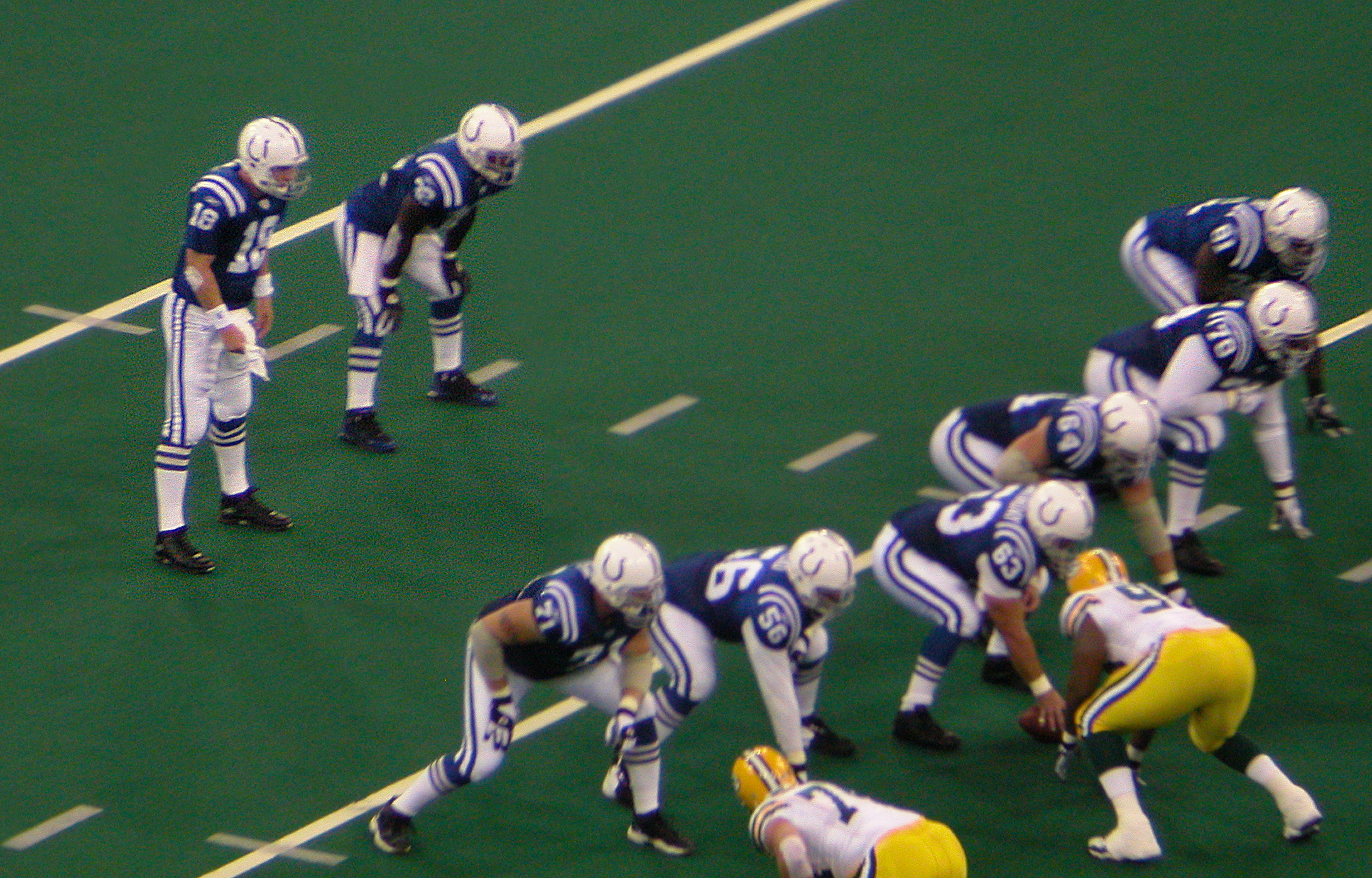
Manning and the Colts line up against the Green Bay Packers in 2004.

The 2004 Colts opened the season with a 27–24 loss to the New England Patriots after placekicker Mike Vanderjagt missed a game-tying field goal in the closing seconds of the game. The Colts won their next four games including a 45–31 win over the Green Bay Packers in which Manning threw five touchdowns, earning him AFC Offensive Player of the Week honors, but then lost their next two games to the Jacksonville Jaguars and the Kansas City Chiefs, despite Manning throwing 840 yards combined in the two games. The Colts responded well, winning their next eight games before losing their final regular season game to Denver, a game in which Manning played only the first series. During the month of November, Manning was named the AFC Offensive Player of the Week twice; once for his five-touchdown performance in a 49–14 blowout over the Houston Texans and once for his performance in a 41–9 road win against the Detroit Lions on Thanksgiving in which he threw six touchdowns in less than three quarters. For his performances in November, Manning earned AFC Offensive Player of the Month honors. He was named AFC Offensive Player of the Week for a fourth time in the week 16 game against the San Diego Chargers where he led the Colts to a 34–31 victory after trailing by 15 in the fourth quarter. With the Colts facing a 4th and 4 at their own 26, Manning waved the punt team off the field and completed a 19-yard pass to wide receiver Reggie Wayne for the first down. He finished the drive with a 21-yard touchdown pass to Brandon Stokley, his 49th touchdown pass of the season, breaking Dan Marino's record of 48. After the two-point conversion to tie, Manning got the ball first in overtime and set up the winning field goal. The Colts clinched the AFC's third seed with the win.

During the season, Manning threw 4,557 yards, had a then record 121.1 passer rating, and a then-record 49 touchdown passes while throwing only 10 interceptions. He was a unanimous first-team All-Pro selection. Manning's 2004 season was voted the second greatest passing season of all time by ESPN in 2013. He achieved this despite the 2004 season being the only season of his career where he threw less than 500 passes. He finished with a league-high 13.6 yards per pass completion and 9.2 yards per pass attempt in 2004. Manning's 9.9% touchdown rate for the season was tied for the sixth highest rate in NFL history (with George Blanda in 1961), and it ranks as the highest by a quarterback in the 21st century. His 49 touchdown passes is currently the third highest ever and his 121.1 passer rating is the second highest ever. He was selected as the 2004 NFL MVP drawing 49 of 50 votes, was named NFL Offensive Player of the Year, and was named the Best NFL Player at the ESPY Awards for the second consecutive year. Manning also received the ESPY Award for Best Record-Breaking Performance for his 49 touchdown passes. The Colts finished the season with a 12–4 record and their second straight AFC South title. The Colts scored a franchise record 522 points. Three Colts receivers had 1,000 yard seasons with at least 10 touchdowns that season, also a record. Sports statistics cite Football Outsiders calculates that Manning had the best season for a quarterback, play-by-play, in 2004.

In the Wild Card Round against the Denver Broncos at home, Manning threw 458 yards and four touchdowns in the 49–24 victory. However, the Colts' 2004 season ended in Foxborough for a second straight season with a 20–3 loss against New England in the Divisional Round, and Manning recorded a season-low passer rating of 69.3. It was Manning's seventh consecutive loss to the Patriots in Foxborough and the Colts' three points were their lowest single game point total since their opening game of the 2003 season.

==== 2005 season ====
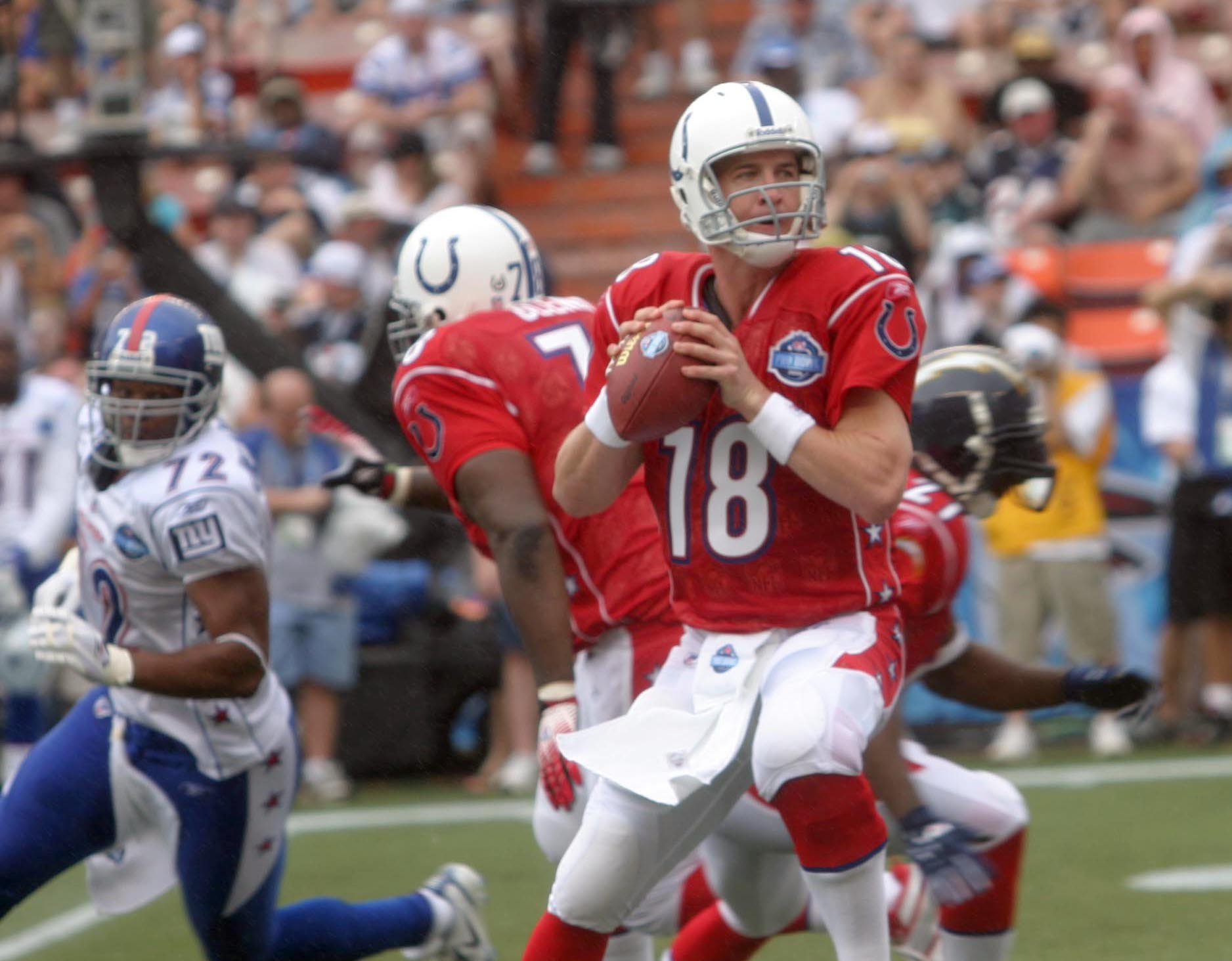
Manning at the 2006 Pro Bowl

In 2005, the Colts had a greatly improved defense over that of recent years. Combining this with their offense, they won their first 13 games, including a 40–21 rout over the two-time defending Super Bowl champion New England Patriots. This was Manning's first road win against the Patriots in eight attempts, and his three touchdown passes earned him AFC Offensive Player of the Week honors. By week 15, the Colts had a perfect 13–0 record, and secured the AFC South and home-field advantage throughout the playoffs. Nevertheless, head coach Tony Dungy made the decision to play all of his regular starters against the San Diego Chargers. However, the Colts played a sub-par game against the Chargers and fell short of the win; the score was 26–17. Manning finished the 2005 season with 3,747 passing yards, which was the first time he threw less than 4,000 yards since his rookie season in 1998, largely because Manning sat out much of the final two games with the top AFC seed clinched. His quarterback rating of 104.1 was the highest in the league for the season.

In the playoffs, the Pittsburgh Steelers visited the RCA Dome for the second AFC Divisional Round game of the 2005 season. In the fourth quarter with only a few minutes left in the game, Manning threw what looked to be the game-ending interception to safety Troy Polamalu, but the interception was overturned (a call the NFL later admitted was incorrect). The Colts went on to score and got the ball back down three points near the end of the game. On fourth down, Manning was sacked near his own goal line and the game seemed to be over as the Steelers were one yard from a touchdown. On the next play, the ball was fumbled by running back Jerome Bettis and picked up by Colts defender Nick Harper who appeared to have a clear path down the sideline for what might have been the game-winning score. However, Steelers' quarterback Ben Roethlisberger dove in front of Harper and tackled him in the leg, saving a touchdown. On the ensuing drive, the Colts moved down the field to the Steelers 27-yard line, before Mike Vanderjagt missed a field goal as time ran out. Manning finished the loss 22 of 38 for 290 yards and a touchdown.

Manning came in second place for the MVP award to Seattle Seahawks running back Shaun Alexander, ending his streak at two years. He was named the 2005 winner of the Walter Payton Man of the Year Award and nominated for the FedEx Air Player of the Year Award, along with Tom Brady and Carson Palmer. Manning was named first-team All-Pro for the third consecutive year and named to the Pro Bowl squad.

==== 2006 season: Super Bowl XLI championship ====
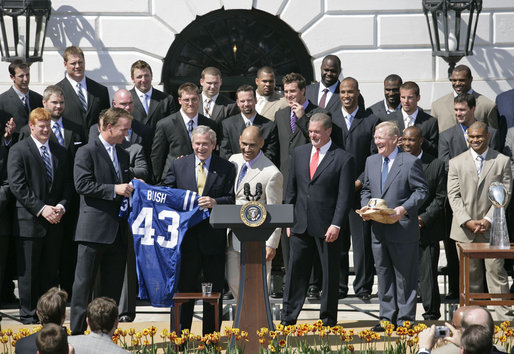
Manning and the 2006 Colts visit President George W. Bush at the White House.

Manning opened the 2006 season against his brother Eli and the New York Giants on Sunday Night Football. It was the first NFL game with starting quarterbacks who were brothers, and the Colts won 26–21. Manning threw 400 yards against the Houston Texans in a 43–24 victory, which earned him AFC Offensive Player of the Week honors. Manning also won the award for his 345 yards and four touchdown passes against the Washington Redskins in week 7. A second trip to New Jersey, this time to face the New York Jets, led to another Colts win. After taking the lead twice in the fourth quarter, Manning led a third scoring drive to finish with a one-yard quarterback sneak rushing touchdown in the last minute for a 31–28 win.

In a road game against the Denver Broncos, Manning again led three scoring drives in the fourth quarter in a 34–31 shootout win. He completed 32-of-39 passes for 345 yards and three touchdowns. Following a second straight season with a win at New England and a home win against Buffalo, the Colts were the NFL's last unbeaten team at 9–0. The Colts became the first team in NFL history to record consecutive 9–0 starts to a season. Their first loss came in a 21–14 road loss to the Dallas Cowboys. Plagued by a run defense that allowed over 100 yards in every game, the Colts were 11–4 heading into their final game. Against the Miami Dolphins, Manning threw 282 yards, two touchdowns, and rushed for another touchdown. The Colts won 27–22, were AFC South division champions, and clinched the third seed in the AFC playoffs. Manning was named AFC Offensive Player of the Week. He ended the regular season with 4,397 passing yards and a league-leading 31 touchdown passes. His passer rating (101.0) was the highest in the league for the third year in a row. Manning helped the offense set an NFL record for third-down conversion rate in a season (56.1%).

Despite three interceptions, Manning completed 30 out of 38 passes for 268 yards and a touchdown as the Colts beat the Kansas City Chiefs in the Wild Card Round by a score of 23–8. The following week, the Colts were limited to five field goals and no touchdowns, but defeated the Baltimore Ravens, 15–6. Manning was 15 of 30 for 170 yards and two interceptions in the Divisional Round victory. In the AFC Championship against the rival New England Patriots, the Colts trailed 14–3 when Manning threw an interception that was returned for a touchdown by Asante Samuel to give New England a 21–3 lead. Manning led the Colts to 32 points in the second half for a 38–34 victory, the final score coming late in the fourth quarter as Manning led the Colts on an 80-yard touchdown drive to take the lead for the first time in the game. He finished the game with 349 passing yards, one passing touchdown, and one rushing touchdown. The comeback was the largest deficit ever overcome in a conference championship.

Completing 25-of-38 passes for 247 yards, a touchdown, and an interception, Manning led the Colts to a 29–17 victory over the Chicago Bears in Super Bowl XLI and was named Super Bowl MVP. He became the first Colts player to receive the honor, as Dallas Cowboys linebacker Chuck Howley was MVP of Super Bowl V, the franchise's previous title. For his role in the Colts' championship run, Manning won the ESPY for Best Championship Performance. Manning was also named to the Pro Bowl and named Second-team All-Pro. After the Super Bowl win, Manning restructured his contract to save the Colts $8.2 million in salary cap space.

==== 2007 season ====
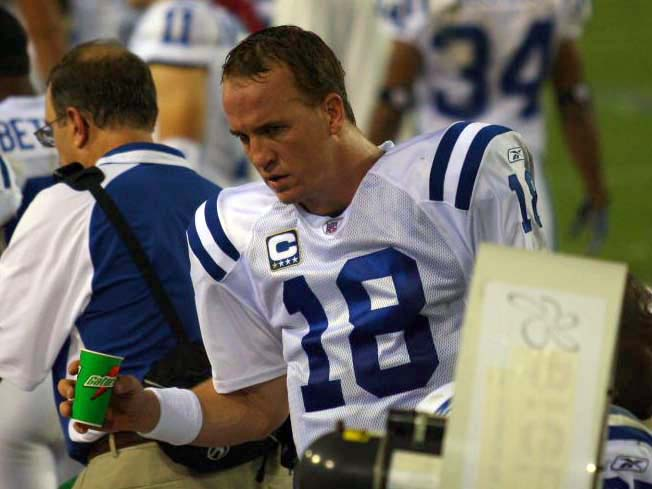
Manning in 2007 at Jacksonville on Monday Night Football

The Colts opened the NFL season with seven wins, putting them against an undefeated New England Patriots squad in a match-up that was called "Super Bowl 41 1/2." Manning and Joseph Addai helped the Colts to a 13–7 halftime lead, and an early fourth-quarter touchdown increased the lead to 20–10. However, Brady led the Patriots to two late touchdowns, giving Manning and the Colts their first loss of the season, 24–20. Manning finished the game with 225 passing yards, one passing touchdown, and a rushing touchdown.

Manning did not bounce back from the loss well. Against the San Diego Chargers, he threw a career-worst and franchise-record six interceptions. Despite this, he was able to rally the Colts from a 23–0 deficit to 23–21. He also gave Adam Vinatieri an opportunity to take the lead with a field goal, but Vinatieri's 29-yard attempt missed, and the Colts fell to 7–2. Manning did not play particularly well against the Kansas City Chiefs either, throwing no touchdowns. However, he managed to lead the Colts on a late drive for a game-winning field goal, rushing for two yards on 4th and 1 in the process. Manning finished the game with 163 passing yards, allowing him to overtake 40,000 in his career. The victory was Manning's 100th.

The Colts won their next five games, securing yet another AFC South title, as well as the AFC's second-seed in the playoffs. In that stretch was a week 13 28–25 victory over the Jacksonville Jaguars where he was 20 of 29 for 288 passing yards, four touchdowns, and an interception. For his performance against the Jaguars, he was named as the AFC Offensive Player of the Week. In the final game of the regular season, Manning played only two series before being replaced by back-up Jim Sorgi; the Colts lost the game to the Tennessee Titans, 16–10. Manning finished the season with 4,040 passing yards, 31 touchdown passes, and a quarterback rating of 98.0. In the Divisional Round, Manning and the Colts lost to the San Diego Chargers, 28–24. Manning helped the Colts to four leads but could not lead a final touchdown drive for the win. Manning finished the game with 402 yards and three touchdowns. He was seen cheering on his brother Eli and the New York Giants in their upset of the previously undefeated New England Patriots during Super Bowl XLII.

==== 2008 season: Third MVP ====
On July 14, 2008, Manning had surgery to remove an infected bursa sac in his left knee. Manning, who wore a knee brace due to problems since he was in college, sat out all four preseason games and missed most of training camp.

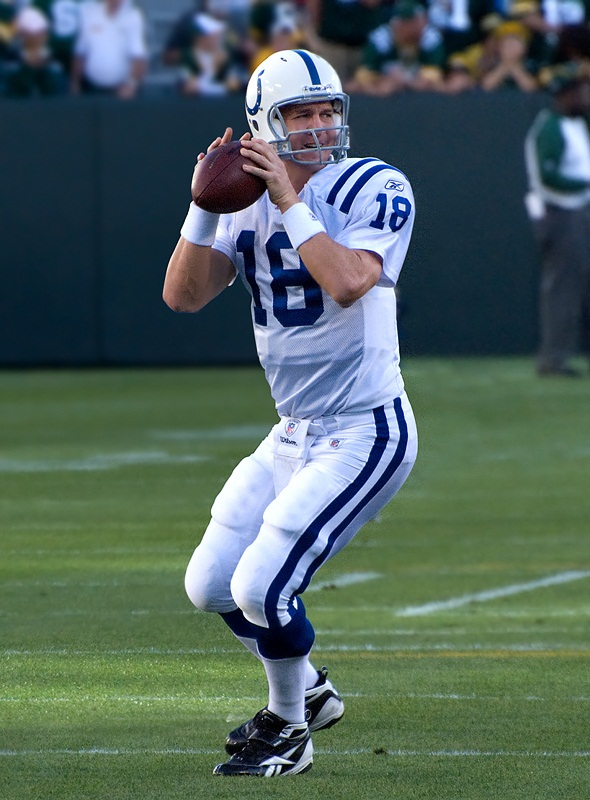
Manning during the 2008 preseason in Green Bay

Manning and the Colts started the 2008 season with a 1–2 record. In week 5, Manning used the fourth quarter to bring the Colts back from a 27–10 deficit in the last five minutes against the Houston Texans to a 31–27 victory. It was the first time an NFL team won a game in regulation after trailing by 17 points in the last five minutes. Manning threw a seven-yard touchdown pass on 4th and 6 to rookie tight end Tom Santi to make the deficit 27–17. Houston quarterback Sage Rosenfels, starting for the injured Matt Schaub, then fumbled the ball on a scramble, and it was returned 68 yards for a touchdown by Gary Brackett. After another Rosenfels fumble, Manning threw the 5-yard game-winning touchdown pass to Reggie Wayne. The Colts scored three touchdowns in 2:10.

On October 12, Manning led the Colts to a 31–3 blowout win at Lucas Oil Stadium against the Baltimore Ravens to avoid their first 0–3 start at home since the 1997 season. Manning was named AFC Offensive Player of the Week for the 17th time in his career for his effort of three touchdown passes and 271 yards passing. It was revealed during the game by CBS commentators Jim Nantz and Phil Simms that Manning had a second surgery on his knee before the season started. Colts coach Tony Dungy confirmed this report the day after the game.

The Colts had their largest defeat of the season, 34–14, against the Green Bay Packers the following week. Manning threw two interceptions that were returned for touchdowns. After a setback to the undefeated Tennessee Titans in week 8, the Colts opened up November with their annual showdown against the New England Patriots on Sunday Night Football. Tied at 15 in the fourth quarter, Manning set up Adam Vinatieri for a 52-yard field goal that proved to be the winning points in an 18–15 victory. Manning completed 21-of-29 passes for 254 yards and two touchdowns.

In a week 10 road game against the Pittsburgh Steelers, who had the league's highest-ranked defense, they trailed 17–7 in the second quarter before Manning found tight end Dallas Clark for a two-yard touchdown to end the half 17–14. Down 20–17 in the fourth quarter, Manning found running back Dominic Rhodes uncovered for a 17-yard touchdown pass that would put the Colts up 24–20 for the rest of the game. It was Manning's fourth game-winning drive (35th of his career) of the season. He completed 21 of 40 for 240 yards and three touchdowns (the 50th game of his career with 3+ touchdown passes). It was the first time the Colts won in Pittsburgh since 1968, breaking a streak of 12 straight losses. Against the Houston Texans, Manning threw 320 yards and two touchdowns while leading five consecutive scoring drives in a 33–27 victory, the third in a row for the Colts. Manning won AFC Offensive Player of the Week for the second time this season (18th time, career).

Following the Texans game, the Colts reeled off four consecutive wins to make their winning streak seven games. Needing a win to clinch the fifth seed in the playoffs, Manning had one of his best career performances against the Jacksonville Jaguars on Thursday Night Football. He completed his first 17 passes of the game. In addition to completing his last six completions the prior week against the Detroit Lions, Manning's 23 straight completions fell one shy of the NFL record. The Colts trailed 14–0 in the first half and 24–14 to start the fourth quarter. Manning led his seventh fourth quarter win of the season and the Colts put the game away with a defensive touchdown for a 31–24 victory to clinch a seventh consecutive playoff berth. Manning completed 29-of-34 passes (85.7%) for 364 yards and three touchdowns. It increased his NFL record streak of seasons with 25 touchdown passes to 11. Manning and the Colts tied an NFL record by winning three games in a season in which they trailed by at least 14 points. For his efforts, Manning won AFC Offensive Player of the Week for the third time in the 2008 season. It was the 19th time he won the award, passing Dan Marino for the most all-time since the award was originated in 1984. He also was selected as the FedEx Air Player of the Week. With the Colts' playoff seeding secured, Manning only played the opening drive in a shutout against the division-leading Titans in week 17. He completed all seven of his passes for 95 yards and a touchdown, extending his NFL record to nine seasons with 4,000 yards passing, and also extended the record to a sixth straight season he led the Colts to at least 12 wins. At the end of the 2008 season, Manning was named NFL MVP for the third time, tying Brett Favre for the most MVP awards in NFL history.

The day following the MVP award, the Colts faced their 2007 nemesis, the San Diego Chargers, in the Wild Card Round. Down 14–10 at the half, Manning put the Colts ahead 17–14 in the third quarter as he completed a 72-yard touchdown pass to wide receiver Reggie Wayne. However, the Chargers tied the game in the fourth quarter as kicker Nate Kaeding nailed a 22-yard field goal. When San Diego won the overtime coin toss, they scored a touchdown on the first possession, ending the Colts' season for the second consecutive season. Manning was 25 of 42 for 310 yards and a touchdown in the loss. At the end of the season, Tony Dungy retired.

==== 2009 season: Fourth MVP and Super Bowl XLIV appearance ====
Manning and his teammates in a game against the Jacksonville Jaguars

Under new head coach Jim Caldwell, Manning started the 2009 season with three consecutive wins and won AFC Offensive Player of the Month for the fourth time in his career. In week 4, against the Seattle Seahawks, Manning threw 353 yards and two touchdowns for his fourth consecutive 300-yard passing game, setting a new franchise record in the 34–17 win.

Manning helped lead the Colts to three more wins to get to a 7–0 record. Against the Houston Texans in week 9, Manning became the first quarterback to throw over 40,000 yards in a decade in the 20–17 victory. He threw a career-high 25 passes in the first quarter, which were the most in any opening quarter since 1991, and had a career-high 40 pass attempts in the first half. He set a franchise record for most 300-yard passing games in a season with his seventh 300-yard effort of the season, which was an NFL record through the first eight games of a season. In week 10, a 35–34 victory over the New England Patriots, he threw 327 yards, four touchdowns, and two interceptions. His performance against the Patriots earned him AFC Offensive Player of the Week honors. Two weeks later, against Houston, Manning claimed his 34th comeback win in the fourth quarter, tying him with John Elway and Johnny Unitas for the second most in NFL history. In week 15 against the Jacksonville Jaguars, Manning won his 23rd consecutive regular season game, breaking Jim McMahon's NFL record of 22 straight wins with the Chicago Bears from 1984 to 1987. Despite having a perfect regular season on the line, Manning was limited in the final two games of the regular season with all clinching scenarios locked up for the Colts. The Colts dropped both games to go into the playoffs with a 14–2 record. Manning finished with 4,500 passing yards, 33 touchdowns, and 16 interceptions, which earned him second in the league in those passing categories. At the end of the regular season, Manning was awarded his fourth MVP, breaking the NFL record for most MVPs by a single player. He was also selected to the AP All-Pro team for the fifth time in his career. He finished the regular season tying his then NFL record with seven game-winning drives in 2009.

In the Divisional Round against the Baltimore Ravens, Manning threw two touchdown passes late in the first half to build a 17–3 halftime lead. He completed 30 passes for 246 yards in leading his eighth straight victory over the Ravens. In the AFC Championship against the New York Jets, Manning overcame a 17–6 deficit late in the second quarter to lead the Colts to 24 unanswered points in a 30–17 win. The 11-point comeback was the third largest in a conference championship game. Manning set a playoff record with his seventh 300-yard passing game in the postseason.

Facing his hometown New Orleans Saints in Super Bowl XLIV, Manning led the Colts to a 10–0 lead after their two first quarter drives, throwing a touchdown pass to wide receiver Pierre Garçon to cap off a 96-yard drive, which tied the longest in Super Bowl history. After running just six plays in the second quarter, the Colts led 10–6 at halftime. The Saints recovered an onside kick to start the second half and took their first lead, 13–10. Manning led a go-ahead touchdown drive to regain the lead. Leading 17–16 at the start of the fourth quarter, placekicker Matt Stover missed a 51-yard field goal for the Colts. The Saints scored the go-ahead touchdown and two-point conversion to take a 24–17 lead with 5:42 left. Manning took over and moved the Colts to the Saints' 31-yard line. Facing a 3rd and 5 with 3:24 left, his pass intended for Reggie Wayne was intercepted by Tracy Porter, who returned it 74 yards for a critical touchdown and a 31–17 Saints lead. Manning drove the Colts down to the 5-yard line in the last minute, but his 4th and goal pass was dropped by Wayne at the goal line. The Saints won their first Super Bowl in franchise history, dropping Manning to 9–9 in the postseason and a 1–1 record in the Super Bowl. Manning finished the Super Bowl with 333 passing yards on 31-of-45 attempts, one touchdown, and one interception.

==== 2010 season ====
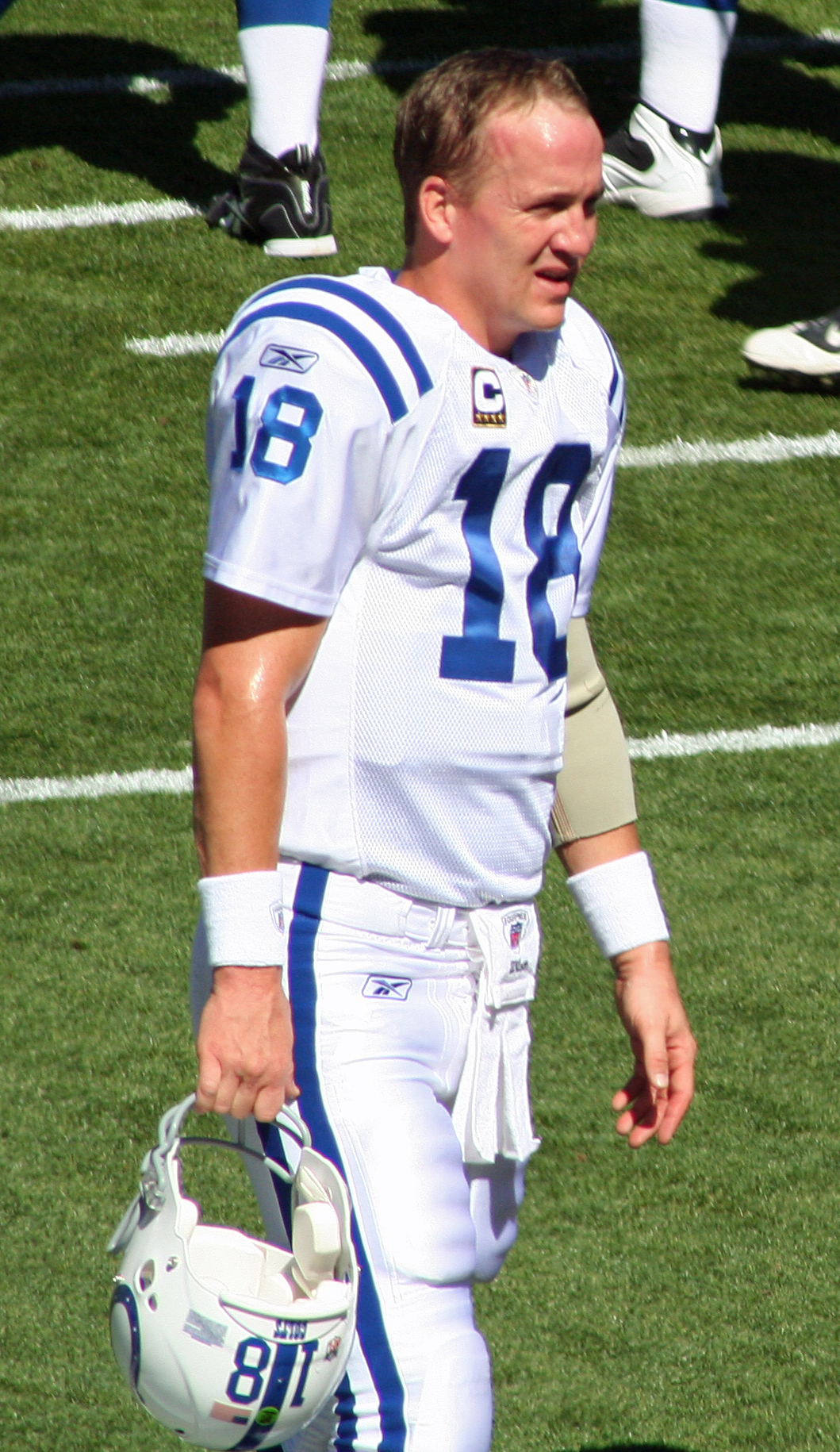
Manning at a pregame against Denver in September 2010

In a season-opening loss to the Houston Texans, Manning set career highs with 57 pass attempts and 40 completions, throwing three touchdowns and 433 yards, the fourth highest opening-weekend total ever. In his third game, Manning threw 325 yards, three touchdowns, and no interceptions, making the first time since 1960 a quarterback began a season with three consecutive games of at least three touchdown passes and zero interceptions. In week 9, against the Philadelphia Eagles, Manning made his 200th consecutive regular season start.

In week 14, against the Tennessee Titans, he went over 4,000 passing yards for the 11th time in a season, and tied Dan Marino with his 63rd regular season game with at least 300 passing yards. Manning was named AFC Offensive Player of the Week for this game. The Colts ended up winning the AFC South for the seventh time in eight years, and Manning became the first quarterback in NFL history to lead his team to nine consecutive postseason berths. It was the 208th consecutive regular season start of his career, breaking Gene Upshaw's record. For the season, Manning finished with an NFL-record 450 completions on 679 attempts and a career-high 4,700 passing yards. Manning's passing yards were a franchise record until it was broken by Andrew Luck in 2014.

The Colts' season ended in a 17–16 loss to the New York Jets in the Wild Card Round of the playoffs. Manning finished his last game with the Colts 18 of 26 for 225 yards and one touchdown.

On the NFL Top 100 Players of 2011, Manning was ranked as the second best player by his peers in the first edition of the players' ranking list.

==== 2011 season: Last season in Indianapolis; injuries ====
To me, he's the greatest of all time. He's a friend of mine, and someone that I always watch and admire, because he always wants to improve, he always wants to get better, and he doesn't settle for anything less than the best. So, when you watch the best and you're able to learn from the best, hopefully that helps me get better.

— Tom Brady on Peyton Manning in 2011.

The Colts placed their franchise tag on Manning on February 15, 2011. On July 30, 2011, the Colts signed Manning to a 5-year, $90 million contract after negotiations in which he made it clear that he did not need to be the highest-paid player in the NFL.

After a May 23 neck surgery, Manning could not use the Colts' facilities for practice and workouts due to the NFL lockout. Reluctant to have witnesses to his recovery, he used the Colorado Rockies baseball team's trainers at Coors Field in Denver. Manning was unable to complete his throwing motion, and his arm strength significantly diminished. Based on an MRI, doctors told him in the late summer that he needed spinal fusion surgery and that at his age (35 years old at the time) they could not guarantee his return to the NFL. On September 7, the Colts officially ruled Manning out for the season opener against the Houston Texans, ending his consecutive starts streak of 208 games (227 including the playoffs); the team signed Kerry Collins out of retirement and named him interim starting quarterback. After seeking other options, Manning had the second surgery on September 8.

At any rate, he was kept on the roster without going on injured reserve, despite the fact that owner Jim Irsay did not believe that he would return to play that year. Manning started practicing throwing footballs again in mid-December, with teammate Joseph Addai even claiming his passes looked "game ready." However, Manning did not play a single game in the 2011 season, and the Colts went 2–14 without him, only the third season since Manning was a rookie that the Colts did not win at least ten games.

With the Colts having the first overall pick in the upcoming 2012 draft, which contained highly rated quarterback Andrew Luck out of Stanford, and with Manning due a $28 million roster bonus, he was released on March 7, 2012. Earlier, the Colts dismissed vice-chairman Bill Polian, who in his previous capacity as general manager drafted Manning, general manager Chris Polian, and head coach Jim Caldwell as a precursor to rebuilding the team.

In an emotional press conference, Manning told Colts fans, "Thank you very much from the bottom of my heart. I truly have enjoyed being your quarterback." Upon his release, Irsay announced that no Colt will ever wear the No. 18 jersey again. However, it would not be formally retired until five years later on October 8, 2017.

On the NFL Top 100 Players of 2012, he was ranked 50th by his peers despite not playing in the 2011 season.

=== Denver Broncos ===
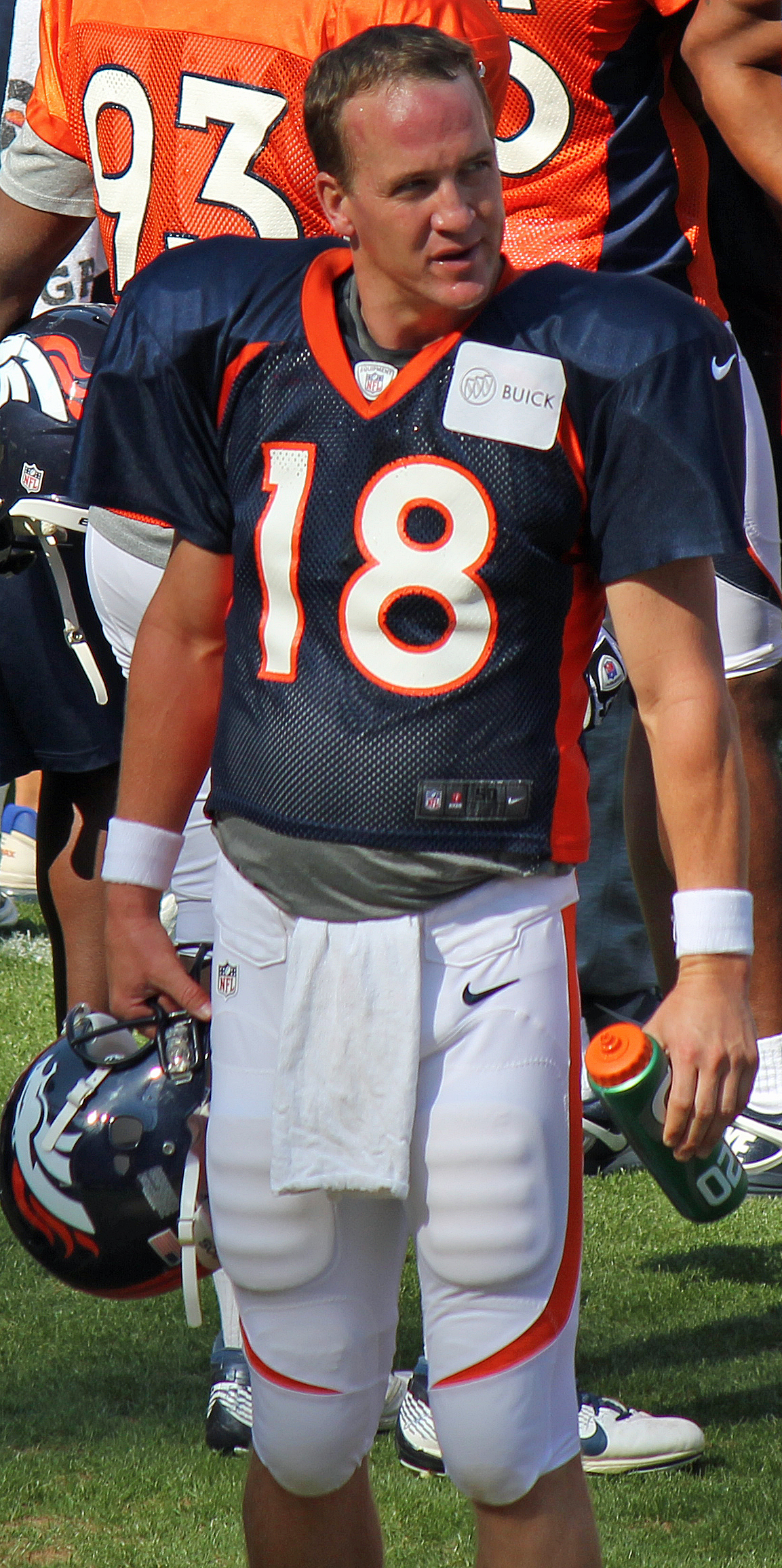
Manning at a scrimmage in Denver in August 2012

Manning was one of the most highly sought after free agents going into the 2012 season. Several teams sought out to meet with Manning including the Miami Dolphins, the Tennessee Titans, the Arizona Cardinals, and the Denver Broncos. After visiting both the Arizona Cardinals and the Denver Broncos, Manning ultimately selected Denver after meeting with John Elway, a retired Broncos Hall-of-Famer quarterback who was now the team's Executive Vice President of Football Operations and General Manager, and Broncos head coach John Fox. Manning reached an agreement with the Broncos on a five-year contract worth $96 million on March 20, 2012. Although the #18 is retired in honor of quarterback Frank Tripucka, Manning received permission from Tripucka to wear it.

==== 2012 season ====
Manning made his regular season debut as a Denver Bronco in the prime time game on the first Sunday of the 2012 season, against the Pittsburgh Steelers. In the game, Manning completed 19-of-26 passes for 253 yards, two touchdowns, and no interceptions. He posted a 129.2 QB rating in the 31–19 win, and made history in the third quarter when he connected to wide receiver Demaryius Thomas on a 71-yard touchdown pass. The touchdown was Manning's first in the NFL with a team other than the Colts, and marked the 400th of his career, making him the third quarterback, after Dan Marino and Brett Favre, to accomplish the feat and the fastest of the three to reach that mark. In a week 6 game against the San Diego Chargers, he was 24 of 30 for 309 yards, three passing touchdowns, and one interception in the 35–24 victory. In the game, the Broncos trailed 24–0 at halftime and Manning led the Broncos to 35 unanswered points. His performance against the Chargers gave him AFC Offensive Player of the Week honors, his first since coming to Denver. Despite preseason concerns about his recovery, by late October, ESPN stated that Manning "has silenced the critics" about his arm strength. Manning was named to the 2013 Pro Bowl, his 12th. In week 17, a 38–3 victory over the Kansas City Chiefs, he was 23 of 29 for 304 yards and three touchdowns to close out the regular season. He earned AFC Offensive Player of the Week honors for his performance against the Chiefs. He finished the season with 4,659 yards, 37 touchdowns, and 11 interceptions. Manning set single-season franchise records for pass attempts, pass completions, passing yards, and touchdowns in the 2012 season, each of these milestones he would surpass again in 2013.

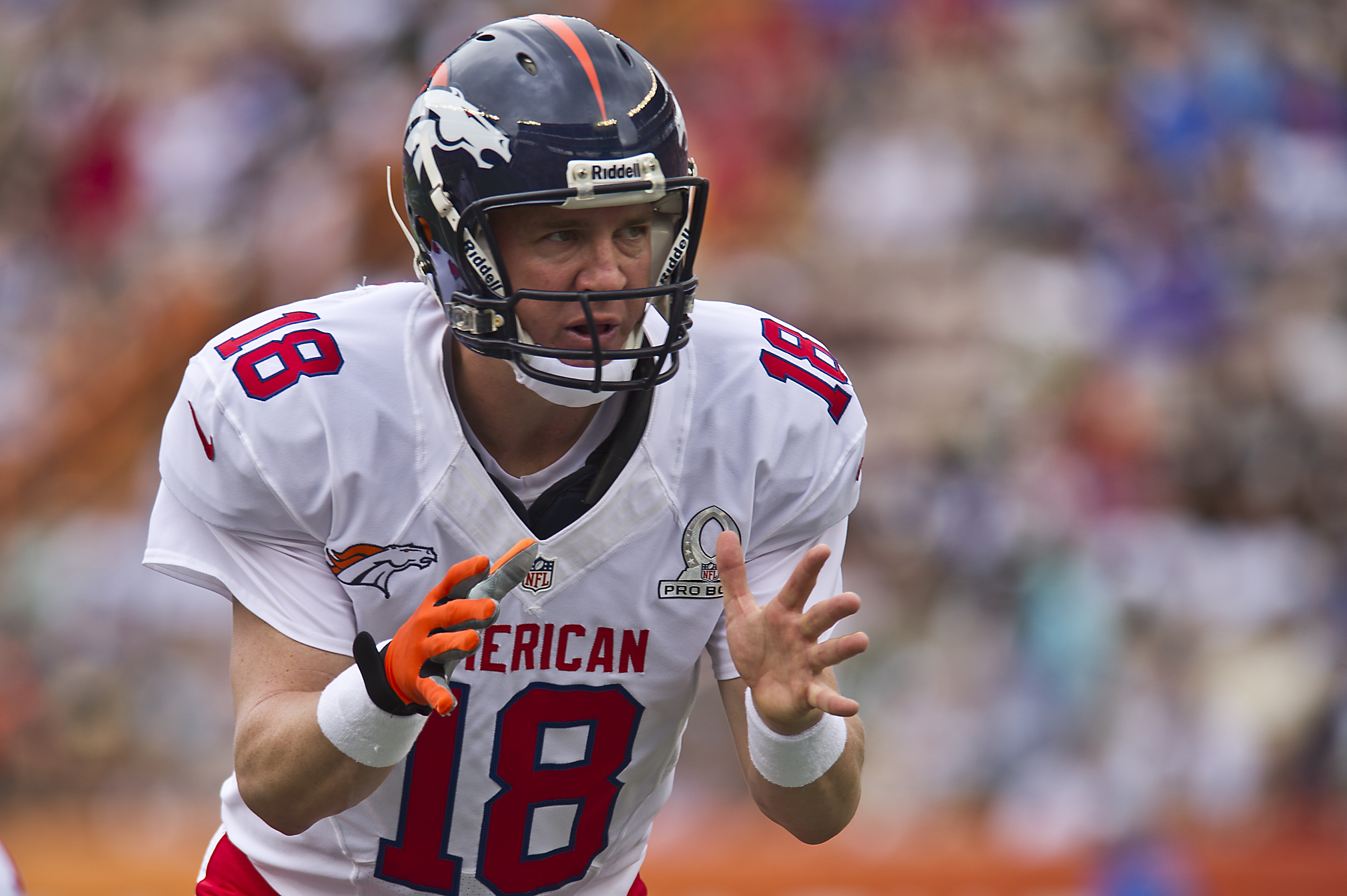
Manning at the 2013 Pro Bowl

The Broncos made the playoffs and earned a first-round bye, but lost 38–35 in double overtime in the Divisional Round to the Baltimore Ravens, who went on to win Super Bowl XLVII that season. Manning finished the game 28 of 43 for 290 passing yards, three touchdowns, and two interceptions.

On February 2, 2013, Manning was awarded the AP National Football League Comeback Player of the Year Award, named a first-team All-Pro selection, and finished second in MVP voting. On the NFL Top 100 Players of 2013, he was ranked as the second best player in the NFL by his peers.

==== 2013 season: Fifth MVP and Super Bowl XLVIII appearance ====
On the opening game of the 2013 NFL season, Manning became the sixth player in NFL history and the first since 1969 to throw seven touchdowns in a game, doing so against the defending Super Bowl XLVII champions, the Baltimore Ravens. He added to this feat by not throwing an interception, tying Y. A. Tittle as one of only two players to have a 7:0 touchdown to interception ratio in a single game (although the Philadelphia Eagles' Nick Foles later matched that feat in Week 9 of the same season against the Oakland Raiders). His historic performance against the Ravens gave him AFC Offensive Player of the Week Honors.

Against the Raiders in Week 3, Manning broke the record for most touchdown passes in the first three games of a season after throwing 12, surpassing Tom Brady's 2011 record. His performance against the Raiders gave him his second AFC Offensive Player of the Week honor in three weeks. In a Week 5 win over the Dallas Cowboys, Manning completed 33-of-42 passes for 414 yards, four passing touchdowns and his first rushing touchdown in five years via a one-yard bootleg just before halftime, but also threw his first interception of the season en route to a 51–48 victory; he was intercepted by cornerback Morris Claiborne. Two weeks later, Manning returned to Indianapolis for the first time in the regular season since being released by the Colts. In an emotional pregame ceremony, the Colts showed a tribute video to Manning. In his first game back at Indianapolis, he was 29 of 49 for 386 yards, three touchdowns, and one interception but was sacked a season-high four times as the Broncos fell 39–33.

On November 24, the Broncos faced the New England Patriots. The Broncos raced out to a 24–0 lead at halftime. However, the Patriots came back and won 34–31 in overtime. In the loss, Manning had a season-low 150 passing yards to go along with two touchdowns and one interception. After the tough loss, the Broncos defeated the Kansas City Chiefs in the following game by a score of 35–28. He had 403 passing yards, five touchdowns, and two interceptions in the victory. He followed that up with 397 passing yards and four passing touchdowns in the 51–28 victory over the Tennessee Titans. In Week 16, against the Houston Texans, Manning broke Brady's record for most touchdown passes in a season with 51 on a 25-yard touchdown pass to tight end Julius Thomas. For the third time in the 2013 season, he earned AFC Offensive Player of the Week honors. In the Week 17 season finale against the Raiders, only playing in the first half, he had 266 passing yards and four passing touchdowns to finish the season with 55 touchdown passes and a league-record 5,477 yards, breaking Drew Brees' mark by one yard. His 450 completions were at the time tied for second most all time. The Broncos scored an NFL record 606 points, becoming the first team ever to eclipse 600 points in a season.

Manning passed for at least 400 yards in a record-tying three games, matching Dan Marino's 1984 season. They had more 50-point games in a season than any other team in NFL history, with three. Four Broncos receivers recorded at least ten touchdowns—an NFL record—and Manning set a season record with nine games with four or more touchdown passes.

His 115.1 passer rating ranks seventh all time and he joined Brady as the only two quarterbacks at the time to achieve a passer rating of 110.0 or higher in more than one season. The Broncos went on to win their Divisional Round playoff game against the San Diego Chargers by a score of 24–17. Manning finished 25 of 36 for 230 passing yards, two touchdowns, and one interception.

In another postseason meeting between Manning and Brady, the Broncos defeated the New England Patriots in the AFC Championship by a score of 26–16. Manning was 32-of-43 for 400 passing yards and two passing touchdowns in the victory. Manning became the third starting quarterback to make the Super Bowl with two teams after Craig Morton and Kurt Warner.

In Super Bowl XLVIII, the Broncos lost to the Seattle Seahawks by a score of 43–8. Manning was up against the Seahawks' young starting quarterback Russell Wilson, who idolized Manning and attended one of Manning's passing camps as a teenager, and later met Manning at a Broncos pre-draft interview. The Seahawks' number one ranked defense proved too much for the Broncos' number one ranked offense to overcome, while the Broncos' defense also struggled due to injuries. The Broncos' first play from scrimmage set the tone for the game. While Manning was stepping forward to call an audible, center Manny Ramirez snapped the ball too early and it flew past Manning's head into the end zone, where running back Knowshon Moreno recovered it, but was then downed for a safety. Manning set a Super Bowl record with 34 completions (broken by Tom Brady the following year in Super Bowl XLIX), but the record-setting offense did not record a first down until the second quarter, and did not score any points until the final seconds of the third quarter. While Manning threw one touchdown pass and one successful two-point conversion, he also threw two costly interceptions, one of which was returned for a touchdown by Malcolm Smith in the second quarter, who went on to win Super Bowl MVP.

On the NFL Top 100 Players of 2014, he was ranked as the best player in the league by his peers.

==== 2014 season: NFL all-time leader in passing touchdowns ====
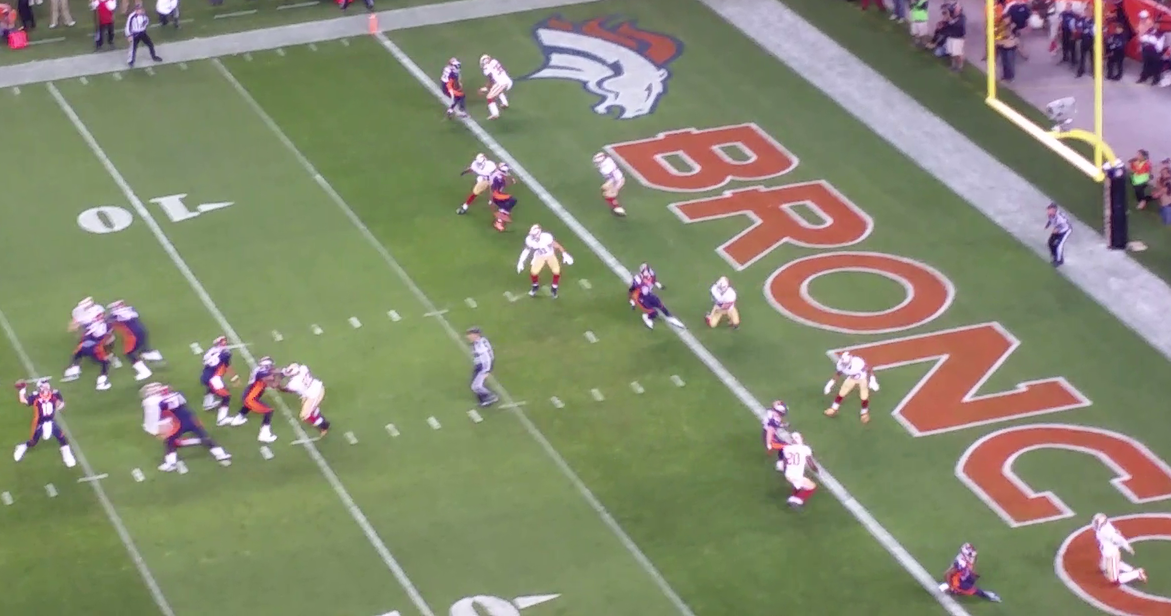
Manning (left) throwing his record-breaking touchdown pass #509 to Demaryius Thomas, October 19, 2014

On August 28, 2014, Manning was fined $8,268 for taunting D. J. Swearinger during a preseason game against the Houston Texans. With the Broncos' 31–24 win in their opening game of the 2014 NFL season against the Colts, Manning became, along with Brett Favre, only one of two starting quarterbacks in NFL history to have beaten all 32 teams. Two weeks later was a Super Bowl XLVIII rematch with the Seattle Seahawks. Despite the 26–20 overtime loss, Manning had 303 passing yards, two passing touchdowns, and one interception by Kam Chancellor as the Broncos fared better than in the previous year's Super Bowl. On October 5, 2014, in a stellar performance against the Arizona Cardinals, Manning threw for a career-high 479 passing yards, tied his career-high with an 86-yard touchdown pass to Demaryius Thomas, threw his 500th career touchdown pass to Julius Thomas, and tied Dan Marino for the most 400-yard games by a quarterback in a 41–20 victory over the previously undefeated Cardinals.

On October 19, 2014, against the San Francisco 49ers on NBC Sunday Night Football, Manning threw his 509th career touchdown pass to Demaryius Thomas, passing Brett Favre to become the NFL's all-time leader in passing touchdowns. His historic touchdown was part of a 318-yard, four-touchdown passing performance where he earned AFC Offensive Player of the Week honors for the 27th and final time in his career. Overall, he finished the 2014 season with 4,727 passing yards, 39 touchdowns, and 15 interceptions. At the end of the regular season, Manning was selected to his 14th Pro Bowl appearance, which at the time tied him with Tony Gonzalez, Bruce Matthews, and Merlin Olsen for most Pro Bowl selections in a career. The Broncos finished with a 12–4 record and earned a first-round bye. However, his season ended after the Broncos lost in the Divisional Round of the playoffs to his former team, the Colts, 24–13. Manning finished 26-for-46 for 211 yards and a touchdown. However, he went just 7-for-18 (38.9%) in the first half, his lowest completion percentage in a first half of any game since 2007. For Manning, the loss was the ninth time he went one-and-done in the postseason. After the season ended, the Broncos and head coach John Fox parted ways. On the NFL Top 100 Players of 2015, he was ranked as the fifth best player by his peers.

==== 2015 season: Super Bowl 50 championship ====
It's not wanting to win that makes you a winner; it's refusing to fail.

— ~ Peyton Manning

After much speculation, Manning announced in the offseason that he would return for his 18th season in the NFL, this time under his fifth head coach, Gary Kubiak. In the season opener against the Baltimore Ravens, Manning's play seemed to have deteriorated, going 24–40 for 175 yards and one interception, but a pick-six by cornerback Aqib Talib and late interception by Darian Stewart aided the Broncos in their 19–13 victory. On November 1, against the Green Bay Packers, he finished with a season-high 340 passing yards and an interception in the dominant 29–10 victory. The Broncos got off to a dominant 7–0 start to the season; however, the streak ended in a loss at Indianapolis, losing 27–24. During that winning streak and the loss in Indianapolis, Manning played better, throwing over 250 yards and nine touchdowns in six of the seven games. However, he never had a game without an interception, bringing his 8-game TD–INT ratio to 9–13, and the Broncos needed a hardworking defense for victories.

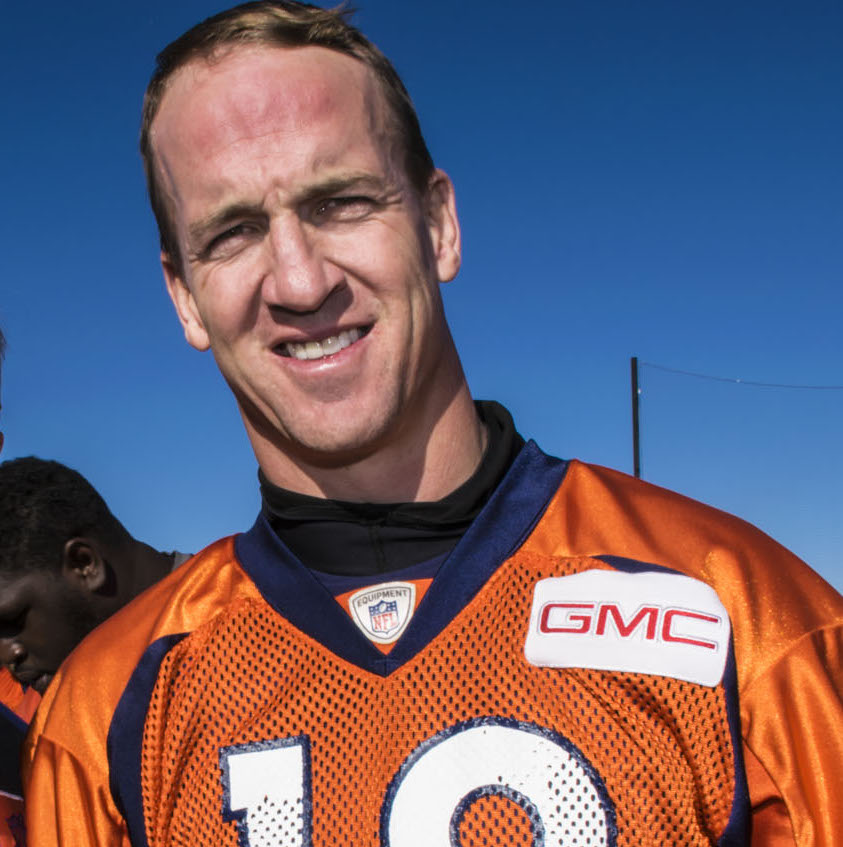
Manning in 2015

In week 10, in the second divisional game against Kansas City, the game's biggest highlight was Manning breaking Brett Favre's record for career passing yards with a four-yard pass to running back Ronnie Hillman in the first quarter. Despite the accomplishment, however, Manning went 5-for-20 for 35 yards and four interceptions with a 0.0 passer rating before Kubiak benched him during the third quarter. Brock Osweiler filled in for Manning for the rest of the game as the Broncos lost 29–13. Manning's record lasted until the 2018 season when Drew Brees broke it in week 5 against the Washington Redskins. A day later, sources said that Manning suffered a bout of plantar fasciitis. It was later announced that the injury would keep him out of week 11, making it the first time he missed a game in a season he played. Osweiler replaced Manning and performed well in a 17–15 win over the Chicago Bears, leading to questions about whether Manning would keep his role when healthy in a week 12 showdown against the New England Patriots. The next day, Kubiak, citing Manning's injuries, announced that Osweiler would start against New England. On December 15, it was announced that Osweiler would make his fifth consecutive start, against the Pittsburgh Steelers, even though Manning returned to practice and the Broncos went seven straight quarters without scoring a touchdown on offense. The Broncos were 4–2 in six games without Manning, giving them an 11–4 record heading into the final week of the regular season.

On December 27, 2015, Al Jazeera America released a report conducted by the Al Jazeera Investigative Unit investigating professional athletes' use of Performance-enhancing drugs (PEDs) which named Manning, among other prominent athletes, as having received illegal drugs from Charles Sly, a pharmacist who worked at the Guyer Anti-Aging Clinic in Indianapolis during the fall of 2011. In July 2016, the NFL cleared Manning of the allegations after it found no evidence to support the claims.

Manning was listed as active for the week 17 regular season finale against the San Diego Chargers, but for the first time since his freshman year at college, he was listed as a backup. In the third quarter, with the Broncos down 13–7, Manning entered the game in relief of Osweiler, who was intercepted twice and fumbled once. He and the Broncos went on to beat the Chargers, 27–20, to secure the AFC West and top seed in the AFC. Despite the Broncos' 12–4 record (and Manning's 8–2 record in games that he played in), Manning had the worst season statistically of his career, as he threw a career-low nine touchdown passes and 17 interceptions in just 10 games, and posted a quarterback rating of 67.9, which was the lowest rating of his career, and the first time he had a rating below 84 since his rookie season. Manning's 59.8 completion percentage was the second lowest of his career, only behind his rookie season. Manning's 17 interceptions were second to Jaguars quarterback Blake Bortles, who threw 18 interceptions but started all 16 games.

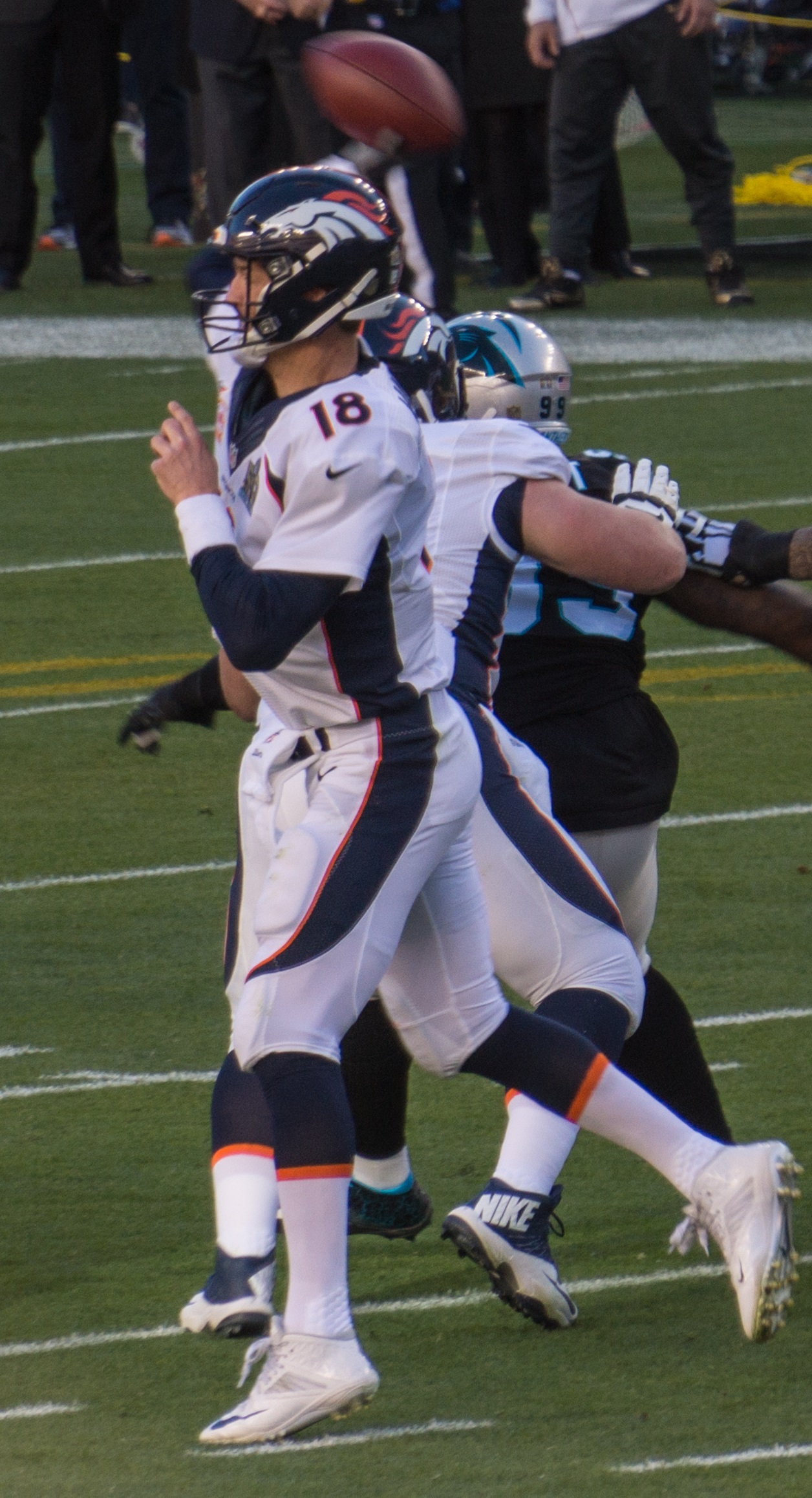
Manning in Super Bowl 50 against the Carolina Panthers

The Broncos, by virtue of having the AFC's #1 seed, earned home-field advantage throughout the NFL playoffs. The Broncos defeated the Pittsburgh Steelers in the Divisional Round by a score of 23–16 to advance to the AFC Championship game to host the defending Super Bowl champions, the New England Patriots. Manning was 21-of-37 for 222 yards with no touchdowns or interceptions in the win over the Steelers. The AFC Championship game was the 17th, and ultimately final, meeting between Manning and his longtime rival Tom Brady. Despite a late comeback attempt from the Patriots, the Broncos won 20–18 to advance to Super Bowl 50. Manning had 176 passing yards, two touchdowns, and no interceptions in the win.

On February 7, 2016, the Broncos defeated the Carolina Panthers 24–10 in Super Bowl 50 as the Broncos' defense shut down the favored Panthers' top-ranked offense and regular season MVP Cam Newton. The game set a record for the largest age difference between opposing Super Bowl quarterbacks at 13 years; Manning was 39 and Newton was 26 (the record has since been surpassed twice). Manning finished the game 13-of-23 for 141 yards and one interception while being sacked five times, scoring his only passing points with 3:08 left in the fourth quarter when he connected with wide receiver Bennie Fowler for a two-point conversion, which ended up being the final pass of his career. Manning became the oldest starting quarterback to both play in and win a Super Bowl at age 39, until Tom Brady surpassed the record at age 41 in Super Bowl LIII and again at age 43 in Super Bowl LV. Manning also became the first quarterback to start in two Super Bowls each with multiple franchises under different head coaches each time (Dungy, Caldwell, Fox, and Kubiak) and the first quarterback to lead two franchises to a Super Bowl victory. The victory gave Manning his 200th overall win including regular season and playoffs, making him the starting quarterback with the most combined regular season and postseason wins in NFL history. Brady has since surpassed Manning's record in 2016.

=== Retirement ===
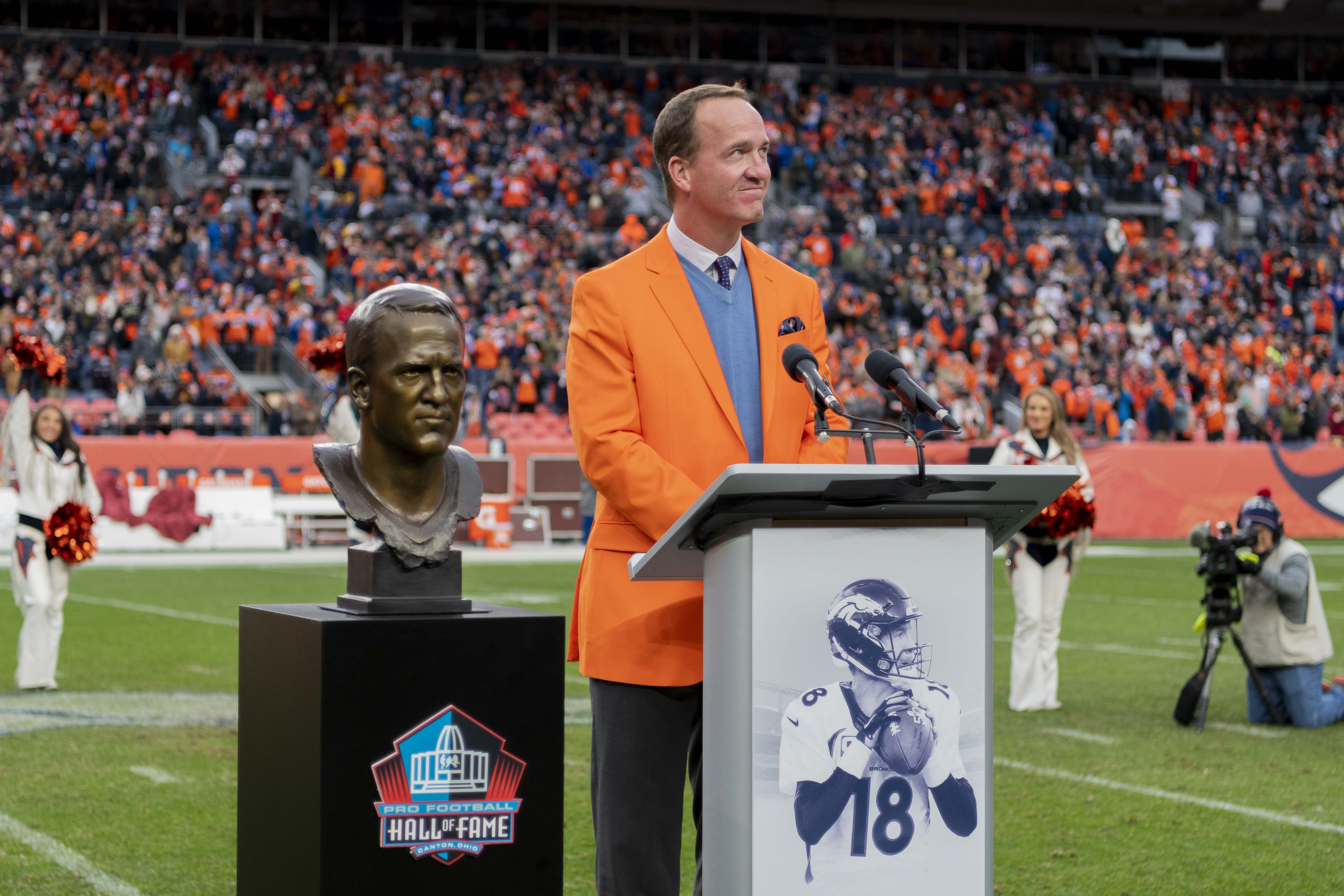
Manning being inducted into the Denver Broncos' Ring of Fame in 2021

Manning announced his retirement, after 18 seasons, on March 7, 2016. The last words of his retirement speech were, "I've fought a good fight. I've finished my football race and after 18 years, it's time. God bless all of you and God bless football." After 18 seasons in the NFL, Manning received the 2016 ESPY Icon Award. He won a total of nine ESPY Awards during his career.

On October 7, 2017, in a ceremony attended by hundreds of fans, the Colts unveiled a bronze statue of Manning outside its Lucas Oil Stadium. Manning was inducted into the Indianapolis Colts Ring of Honor and was the first player to have his jersey retired by the Colts since they moved to Indianapolis. In 2019, Manning was named to the NFL 100 All-Time Team.

On February 6, 2021, Manning was elected into the Pro Football Hall of Fame in his first year of eligibility, with the committee taking only 13 seconds to debate his selection. On June 9, 2021, Manning was unanimously elected to the Denver Broncos Ring of Fame. Manning was inducted into the Pro Football Hall of Fame on August 8, 2021, and the Broncos Ring of Fame on October 31, 2021. Peyton, along with Eli, were named to the 2022 SEC Football Legends Class.

=== "The Manning Bowl" ===
Peyton and Eli Manning played against each other three times in the regular season during their professional careers. These encounters were colloquially dubbed "The Manning Bowl", and Peyton's teams, twice with the Colts and once with the Broncos, held a 3–0 record over Eli and the New York Giants. The first Manning Bowl was held on September 10, 2006, and Peyton's Colts defeated Eli's Giants by a score of 26–21. The second Manning Bowl was held on September 19, 2010, with Peyton and the Colts beating Eli's Giants again by a score of 38–14. The third and final Manning Bowl was held on September 15, 2013, and Peyton and the Broncos beat Eli's Giants 41–23. They faced each other in two Pro Bowls, in 2009 and 2013, both won by the NFC. However, they never faced each other in the playoffs as both always played in separate conferences and never made the Super Bowl at the same time.

Additionally, each quarterback coincidentally played in a Super Bowl held at his brother's home stadium; in February 2012, Eli's Giants defeated the New England Patriots in Super Bowl XLVI at Lucas Oil Stadium, Peyton's home stadium with Indianapolis. Two years later in February 2014, Peyton's Broncos lost to the Seattle Seahawks in Super Bowl XLVIII at MetLife Stadium, Eli's home stadium with New York.

== Career statistics ==
Legend
	AP NFL MVP
	Super Bowl MVP
	Won the Super Bowl
	NFL record
	Led the league
**Bold**	Career high

=== NFL ===
==== Regular season ====
Year	Team	Games			Passing										Rushing					Sacked		Fumbles (Note: Fumbles lost data taken from Pro Football Reference career game log)	
Year	Team	GP	GS	Record	Cmp	Att	Pct	Yds	Y/A	Y/G	Lng	TD	Int	Rtg	Att	Yds	Y/A	Lng	TD	Sck	SckY	Fum	Lost
1998	IND	16	16	3–13	326	575	56.7	3,739	6.5	233.7	78	26	**28**	71.2	15	62	4.1	15	0	22	109	3	1
1999	IND	16	16	13–3	331	533	62.1	4,135	7.8	258.4	80	26	15	90.7	35	73	2.1	13	2	14	116	6	3
2000	IND	16	16	10–6	357	571	62.5	4,413	7.7	275.8	78	33	15	94.7	37	116	3.1	14	1	20	131	5	2
2001	IND	16	16	6–10	343	547	62.7	4,131	7.6	258.2	**86**	26	23	84.1	35	**157**	**4.5**	**33**	**4**	**29**	**232**	7	3
2002	IND	16	16	10–6	392	591	66.3	4,200	7.1	262.5	69	27	19	88.8	**38**	148	3.9	13	2	23	145	6	2
2003	IND	16	16	12–4	379	566	67.0	4,267	7.5	266.7	79	29	10	99.0	28	26	0.9	10	0	18	107	6	1
2004	IND	16	16	12–4	336	497	67.6	4,557	**9.2**	284.8	80	49	10	**121.1**	25	38	1.5	19	0	13	101	5	1
2005	IND	16	16	**14–2**	305	453	67.3	3,747	8.3	234.2	80	28	10	104.1	33	45	1.4	12	0	17	81	5	2
2006	IND	16	16	12–4	362	557	65.0	4,397	7.9	274.8	68	31	9	101.0	23	36	1.6	12	**4**	14	86	2	1
2007	IND	16	16	13–3	337	515	65.4	4,040	7.8	252.5	73	31	14	98.0	20	−5	−0.3	4	3	21	124	6	1
2008	IND	16	16	12–4	371	555	66.8	4,002	7.2	250.1	75	27	12	95.0	20	21	1.1	12	1	14	86	1	0
2009	IND	16	16	**14–2**	393	571	**68.8**	4,500	7.9	281.3	80	33	16	99.9	19	−13	−0.7	3	0	10	74	2	0
2010	IND	16	16	10–6	**450**	**679**	66.3	4,700	6.9	293.8	73	33	17	91.9	18	18	1.0	27	0	16	91	3	1
2011	IND	0	0	Did not play due to injury																			
2012	DEN	16	16	13–3	400	583	68.6	4,659	8.0	291.2	71	37	11	105.8	23	6	0.3	10	0	21	137	2	2
2013	DEN	16	16	13–3	**450**	659	68.3	**5,477**	8.3	**342.3**	78	**55**	10	115.1	32	−31	−1.0	1	1	18	120	**10**	**6**
2014	DEN	16	16	12–4	395	597	66.2	4,727	7.9	295.4	**86**	39	15	101.5	24	−24	−1.0	4	0	17	118	5	2
2015	DEN	10	9	7–2	198	331	59.8	2,249	6.8	224.9	75	9	17	67.9	6	−6	−1.0	−1	0	16	95	1	0
Career		266	265	186–79	6,125	9,380	65.3	71,940	7.7	270.5	86	539	251	96.5	431	667	1.5	33	18	303	1,953	75	28

==== Postseason ====
Year	Team	Games			Passing										Rushing					Sacked		Fumbles	
Year	Team	GP	GS	Record	Cmp	Att	Pct	Yds	Y/A	Y/G	Lng	TD	Int	Rtg	Att	Yds	Y/A	Lng	TD	Sck	SckY	Fum	Lost
1999	IND	1	1	0–1	19	42	45.2	227	5.4	227.0	33	0	0	62.3	2	**22**	**11.0**	**15**	**1**	0	0	0	0
2000	IND	1	1	0–1	17	32	53.1	194	6.1	194.0	30	1	0	82.0	1	−2	−2.0	−2	0	0	0	0	0
2002	IND	1	1	0–1	14	31	45.2	137	4.4	137.0	17	0	2	31.2	1	2	2.0	2	0	1	13	0	0
2003	IND	3	3	2–1	67	103	65.0	918	8.9	306.0	**87**	**9**	4	106.4	4	3	0.8	3	0	5	41	1	0
2004	IND	2	2	1–1	54	75	**72.0**	696	**9.3**	348.0	49	4	2	**107.4**	2	8	4.0	7	**1**	2	12	1	0
2005	IND	1	1	0–1	22	38	57.9	290	7.6	290.0	50	1	0	90.9	0	0	—	0	0	5	43	0	0
2006	IND	4	4	**4–0**	**97**	**153**	63.4	**1,034**	6.8	258.5	53	3	**7**	70.5	**8**	3	0.4	7	**1**	6	41	1	1
2007	IND	1	1	0–1	33	48	68.8	402	8.4	**402.0**	55	3	2	97.7	1	−6	−6.0	−6	0	0	0	0	0
2008	IND	1	1	0–1	25	42	59.5	310	7.4	310.0	72	1	0	90.4	1	−1	−1.0	−1	0	1	8	0	0
2009	IND	3	3	2–1	87	128	68.0	956	7.5	318.7	46	6	2	99.0	3	−2	−0.7	0	0	4	30	0	0
2010	IND	1	1	0–1	18	26	69.2	225	8.7	225.0	57	1	0	108.7	0	0	—	0	0	1	6	0	0
2012	DEN	1	1	0–1	28	43	65.1	290	6.7	290.0	32	3	2	88.3	1	−1	−1.0	−1	0	3	17	2	1
2013	DEN	3	3	2–1	91	128	71.1	910	7.1	303.3	37	5	3	94.2	3	−2	−0.7	0	0	1	1	1	1
2014	DEN	1	1	0–1	26	46	56.5	211	4.6	211.0	32	1	0	75.5	0	0	—	0	0	2	11	1	1
2015	DEN	3	3	3–0	51	92	55.4	539	5.9	179.7	34	2	1	75.4	5	10	2.0	12	0	**9**	**75**	**4**	**2**
Career		27	27	14–13	649	1,027	63.2	7,339	7.1	271.8	87	40	25	87.4	32	34	1.1	15	3	40	298	11	6

==== Super Bowl ====
Year	SB	Team	Opp.	Passing								Result
Year	SB	Team	Opp.	Cmp	Att	Pct	Yds	Y/A	TD	Int	Rtg	Result
2006	XLI	IND	CHI	25	38	65.8	247	6.5	**1**	1	81.8	**W** 29–17
2009	XLIV	IND	NO	31	45	68.9	**333**	**7.4**	**1**	1	**88.5**	L 31–17
2013	XLVIII	DEN	SEA	**34**	**49**	**69.4**	280	5.7	**1**	**2**	73.5	L 43–8
2015	50	DEN	CAR	13	23	56.5	141	6.1	0	1	56.6	**W** 24–10
Career				103	155	66.5	1,001	6.5	3	5	77.4	W−L 2–2

=== College ===
Year	Team	Games (Note: Manning's statistics from his four bowl game appearances are excluded, as bowl game statistics were not officially counted toward season or career totals prior to 2002.)			Passing								Rushing			
Year	Team	GP	GS	Record	Cmp	Att	Pct	Yds	Y/A	TD	Int	Rtg	Att	Yds	Avg	TD
1994	Tennessee	12	8	7–1	89	144	61.8	1,141	7.9	11	6	145.2	21	−26	−1.2	1
1995	Tennessee	12	12	11–1	244	380	64.2	2,954	7.8	22	4	146.5	41	6	0.1	5
1996	Tennessee	12	12	10–2	243	380	63.9	3,287	8.7	20	12	147.7	42	−131	−3.1	3
1997	Tennessee	13	13	11–2	287	477	60.2	3,819	8.0	36	11	147.7	49	−30	−0.6	3
Career		49	45	39–6	863	1,381	62.5	11,201	8.1	89	33	147.1	153	–181	–1.2	12

== Career highlights ==
=== Awards and honors ===
NFL

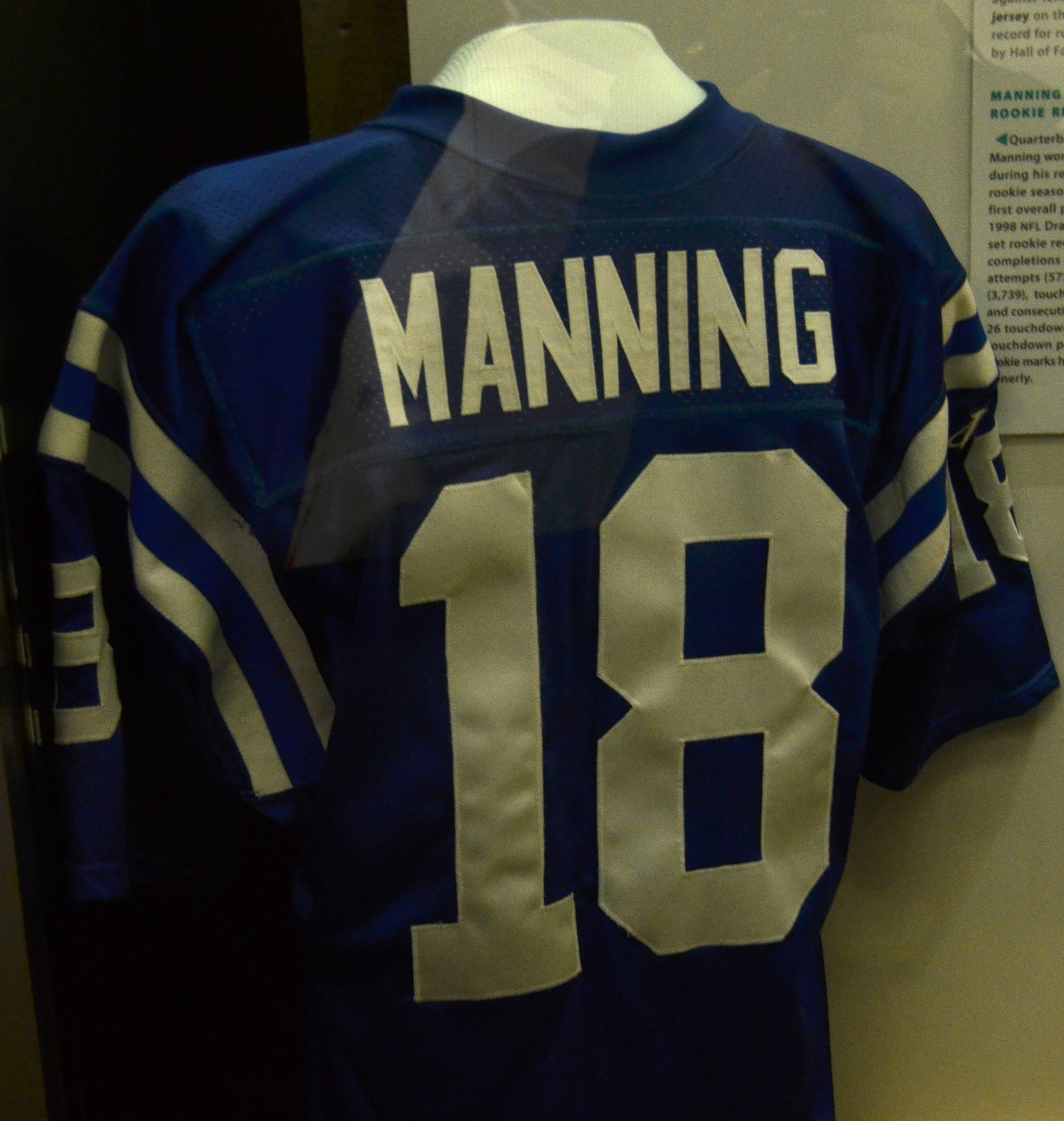
Manning's #18 jersey exhibited at the Pro Football Hall of Fame. Manning himself was inducted in 2021.

- 2× Super Bowl champion (XLI, 50)
- Super Bowl MVP (2007)
- 5× NFL MVP (2003, 2004, 2008, 2009, 2013; record)
- 2× Newspaper Enterprise Association NFL MVP (2003, 2004)
- 2× NFL Offensive Player of the Year (2004, 2013)
- NFL Comeback Player of the Year (2012)
- 3× NFL passing yards leader (2000, 2003, 2013)
- 4× NFL passing touchdowns leader (2000, 2004, 2006, 2013)
- 3× NFL passer rating leader (2004–2006)
- 2× NFL completion percentage leader (2003, 2012)
- 4× Total quarterback rating leader: 2006, 2008, 2012, 2013
- 14× Pro Bowl (1999–2000, 2002–2010, 2012–2014)
- Pro Bowl MVP (2004)
- 7× First-team All-Pro (2003–2005, 2008–2009, 2012–2013)
- 3× Bert Bell Award (2003, 2004, 2013)
- NFL All-Rookie first-team (1998)
- Walter Payton Man of the Year Award (2005)
- Byron "Whizzer" White Humanitarian Award (2005)
- Bart Starr Award (2005)
- Pro Bowl MVP (2005)
- 4× FedEx Air Player of the Year (2003, 2004, 2012, 2013)
- 27× AFC Offensive Player of the Week
- 10× Pro Football Weekly NFL Offensive Player of the Week
- 8× AFC Offensive Player of the Month
- 5× NFL Top 100 — 2nd (2011), 50th (2012), 2nd (2013), 1st (2014), 5th (2015)
- No. 8 on The Top 100: NFL's Greatest Players
- Number 18 retired by the Indianapolis Colts
- Number 18 retired by the Denver Broncos
- Statue outside Lucas Oil Stadium in Indianapolis

NCAA

- Consensus All-American (1997)
- 2× Third-team All-American (1995, 1996)
- Maxwell Award winner (1997)
- Davey O'Brien Award (1997)
- James E. Sullivan Award (1997)
- Johnny Unitas Golden Arm Award (1997)
- Campbell Trophy (1997)
- 1997 SEC Player of the Year
- SEC Freshman of the Year (1994)
- 2× First-team All-SEC (1995, 1997)
- Second-team All-SEC (1996)
- SEC Male Athlete of the Year (1998)
- Number 16 retired by the Tennessee Volunteers

Halls of Fame

- College Football Hall of Fame inductee (class of 2017)
- Pro Football Hall of Fame inductee (class of 2021)
- Colorado Sports Hall of Fame (class of 2018)
- Indiana Sports Hall of Fame (class of 2020)
- Louisiana Sports Hall of Fame (class of 2019)
- Tennessee Sports Hall of Fame (class of 2019)
- University of Tennessee Athletics Hall of Fame (2019)

Media

- 2013 Sports Illustrated Sportsman of the Year
- Five-time ESPY Award winner:
  - Three-time Best NFL Player – 2004, 2005, 2014
  - 2007 Best Championship Performance
  - 2007 Outstanding Team (with the Indianapolis Colts)

Sports Emmy Awards

- 2022 Outstanding Live Series (as executive producer of the Monday Night Football "Manningcast" on ESPN2)
- 2023 Outstanding Personality/Sports Event Analyst
- 2024 Outstanding Live Series (as executive producer of the Monday Night Football "Manningcast" on ESPN2)

=== Records ===
==== NFL records ====
Manning holds a number of individual NFL career records:

- Most AP NFL Most Valuable Player Awards: 5 (2003, 2004, 2008, 2009, 2013)
- Most First-Team All-Pro selections for a quarterback: 7 (2003–2005, 2008–2009, 2012–2013)
- First quarterback to reach 200 career wins (playoffs and regular season)
- Most touchdown passes, season: 55 (2013)
- Most seasons with at least 4,000 passing yards: 14 (1999–2004, 2006–2010, 2012–2014)
- Most passing yards, season: 5,477 (2013)
- Yards per game in a single season: 342.3 (2013) (tied with Drew Brees)
- Most NFL teams beaten: 32 (tied with Brett Favre, Drew Brees, and Tom Brady)
- Most consecutive seasons with at least 25 touchdown passes: 13 (1998–2010)
- Most games with a perfect passer rating, career: 4 (includes 1 playoff game) (tied with Lamar Jackson)
- Most consecutive games started to open a career: 208
- Most consecutive games with at least 2 touchdown passes: 15 (2013–2014)
- Most consecutive games with at least 4 touchdown passes: 5 (games 7–11, 2004)
- Most games with at least four touchdown passes, season: 9 (2013)
- Only quarterback with at least six touchdown passes in three games
- One of eight quarterbacks with at least seven touchdown passes in a game
- Highest completion percentage by a quarterback in one month in NFL history (min. 75 attempts): 81.8% (December 2008)
- Most consecutive regular season wins as a starter: 23 (2008–2009)
- Only quarterback to lead five consecutive 4th-quarter comeback wins (games 7–11, 2009)
- One of four quarterbacks to defeat the other 31 teams during the regular season
- Most interceptions thrown by a rookie quarterback: 28

==== Indianapolis Colts franchise records ====
- Most passing yards, career: 54,828
- Most touchdown passes, career: 399
- Most completions, career: 4,682
- Completion percentage, career: 64.9
- Most touchdown passes, season: 49 (2004)
- Most completions, season: 450 (2010)
- Completion percentage, season: 68.8 (2009)

==== Denver Broncos franchise records ====
- Completion percentage, career: 66.5
- Most passing yards, season: 5,477 (2013)
- Most touchdown passes, season: 55 (2013)
- Most completions, season: 450 (2013)
- Completion percentage, season: 68.6 (2012)

== Personal life ==
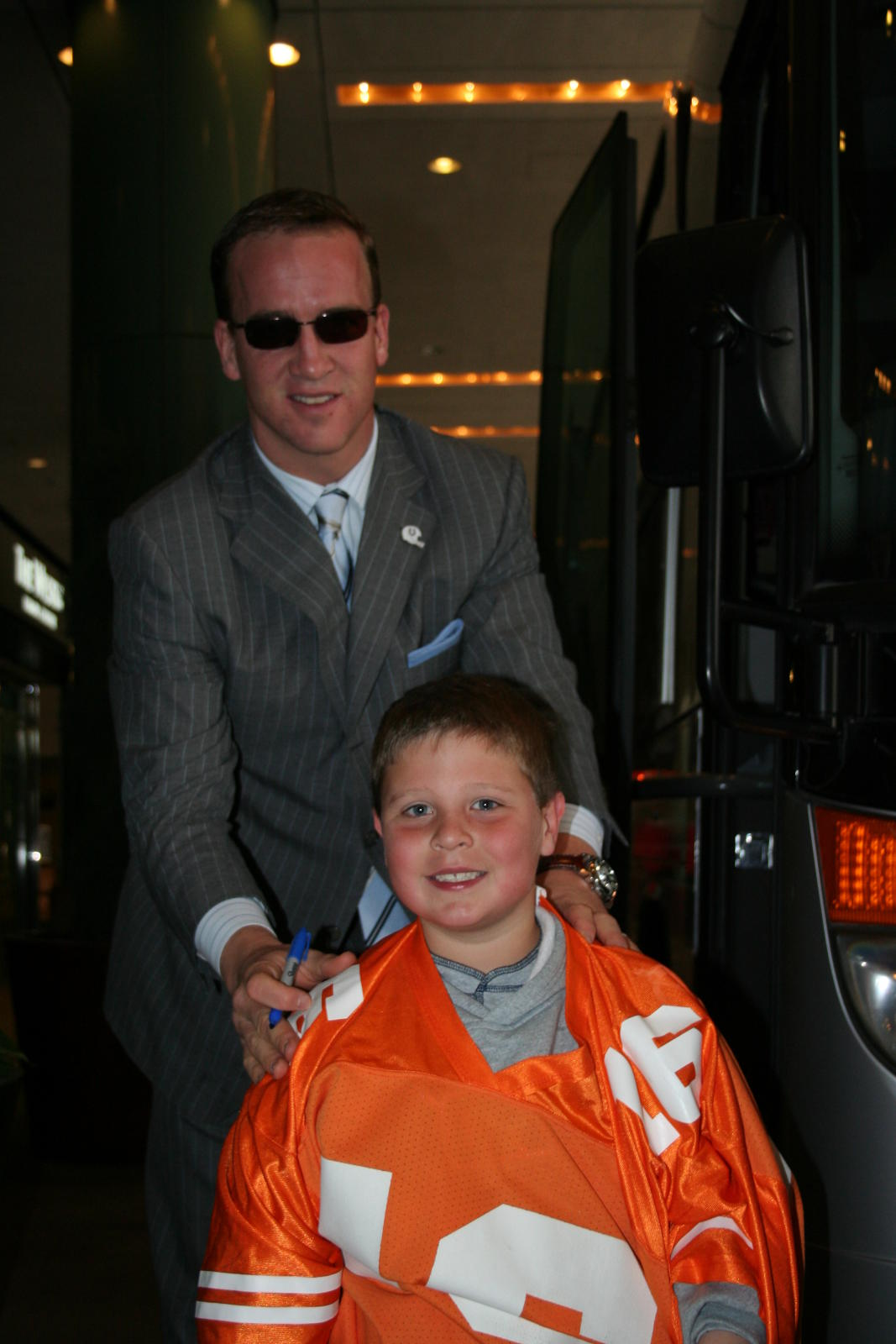
Manning with a fan in 2006

Manning was born in New Orleans, Louisiana, the second son of Olivia (née Williams) and former NFL quarterback Archie Manning. His younger brother is two-time Super Bowl champion Eli Manning. Some have described the Mannings as football's "royal family".

Manning married his wife, Ashley, in Memphis on St. Patrick's Day, 2001. A graduate of the University of Virginia, Ashley was introduced to him by her parents' next-door neighbor the summer before Manning's freshman year in college. The couple has twins: a son, Marshall Williams, and a daughter, Mosley Thompson, who were born on March 31, 2011. They live in Denver, Colorado. Upon his arrival in Denver, Manning temporarily lived in a house owned by Mike Shanahan until purchasing his own home for $4.575 million.

Manning is a Presbyterian Christian. At age 13, he said, "I committed my life to Christ, and that faith has been most important to me ever since." Manning said his priorities ranked in order are "...faith, family, friends, and football." Manning said he prays every night and before games and added, "I hope (and pray) I don't do too many things that displease Him before I get to Heaven myself. I believe, too, that life is much better and freer when you're committed to God in that way."

Manning reportedly memorized the Colts' playbook within a week after being drafted, and in 2012, he was able to precisely recall the details and timing of a specific play that he used at Tennessee 16 years earlier.

During the summer, Archie, Peyton, Eli, and oldest sibling Cooper run the Manning Passing Academy, a five-day camp that aims to improve the offensive skills of quarterbacks, wide receivers, tight ends, and running backs. In addition to the Mannings, the camp has included many prominent football players as coaches, such as Colts wide receivers Marvin Harrison and Reggie Wayne.

Manning, along with his father Archie, co-authored a book titled Manning: A Father, His Sons, and a Football Legacy, which was released in 2000. The book covers Archie's and Cooper's lives and careers, and Manning's life and career up to the time that the book was released, and examines football from both Archie's and Manning's points-of-view. Manning wrote about Jamie Ann Naughright, who accused him of sexual assault, stating that she had a "vulgar mouth". He described his conduct toward her as "crude, maybe, but harmless". Naughright sued for defamation, resulting in an undisclosed settlement in 2003 and a court order imposing a condition on both Manning and Naughright preventing them from ever talking about the settlement or each other again.

Mark Kiszla, a sports columnist for the Denver Post, in a column about Manning's future plans, said that Manning's net worth "is estimated to be in excess of $150 million" and "That's not enough money to buy an NFL franchise by himself, although an ownership group that included Manning as president with a financial stake in the team would be led by a brilliant football mind." He has donated over $8,000 to Republican politicians, among them Fred Thompson, Bob Corker, and former President George W. Bush. During the 2016 presidential race, Manning contributed to the campaign of Jeb Bush. On October 26, 2012, Manning bought 21 Papa John's Pizza stores, all in Colorado. He sold his shares of the stores in February 2018.

During his professional career, Manning earned the nickname, "the Sheriff". The nickname had its origin traced to a Monday Night Football broadcast in 2009 when analyst Jon Gruden described Manning's ability to use audibles at the line of scrimmage on the road.

In honor of Manning, the University of Tennessee offers a Peyton Manning Scholarship to incoming freshmen.

=== Other work ===
Manning has been credited with helping to improve the city of Indianapolis. A curator at the Indiana State Museum stated that "There is no Super Bowl held here without Peyton. There is no Lucas Oil Stadium without Peyton. Without Peyton, the Colts would probably be in L.A. right now." He became one of the NFL's most marketable players, appearing in several television and printed advertisements for some of the NFL's biggest sponsors.

On March 24, 2007, his 31st birthday, Manning hosted NBC's Saturday Night Live (season 32, episode 16). His brother Eli also hosted the show five years later. The episode earned the show's highest household rating in more than 10 months in the metered markets. He appeared on SNL again in 2008, the Saturday Night Live 40th Anniversary Special in 2015, and on Weekend Update on the January 29, 2022, episode hosted by Willem Dafoe.

On May 27, 2007, Manning waved the green flag to begin the 91st Indianapolis 500. On February 18, 2018, he drove the pace car during the 2018 Daytona 500. Before the latter, he made a guest appearance on Fox NASCAR's pre-race show alongside race pole-sitter and fellow Nationwide Insurance spokesman Alex Bowman.

In 2009, Manning guest voiced (with his brothers Eli and Cooper) on an episode of The Simpsons called "O Brother, Where Bart Thou?" in which Bart dreams of having a baby brother and sees famous brothers like The Marx Brothers, The Blues Brothers, The Wright Brothers, The Mario Brothers, and The Manning Brothers. He also voiced Guapo in the 2017 movie Ferdinand.

Manning hosted the 2017 ESPY Awards on July 12, 2017.

Manning is the host of Peyton's Places, a documentary series about football on ESPN+, in which Manning interviews players, coaches, and celebrities. The series was renewed for a third season in December 2020. The series is currently produced by Manning's own production studio, Omaha Productions, which he co-founded in 2020 and is named after his trademark audible call. Through the studio, Manning also serves as a producer on the sports documentary series Quarterback and Full Court Press.

In 2021, Peyton hosted a revival of the quiz show College Bowl, with his brother Cooper as his "sidekick". The series was renewed in 2022 for a second season.

In 2021, Peyton and Eli began hosting an alternative broadcast of Monday Night Football called the Manningcast on ESPN2 and ESPN+. The show features segments with special guest stars from entertainment, politics, and sports while the Manning brothers watch and commentate on the game.

Manning has also expressed interest in becoming a potential owner of the Denver Broncos.

In 2023, it was announced Manning would join the University of Tennessee as a professor in the College of Communication and Information. Most recently, his Omaha Productions company had secured a deal with 20th Television.

On June 3, 2025, it was announced Manning would be joining the ownership group of the National Women's Soccer League (NWSL) team Denver Summit FC. Manning had a supporting role as Laird in the 2025 movie Is This Thing On? which was directed by Bradley Cooper with Will Arnett as the lead.

=== Philanthropy ===
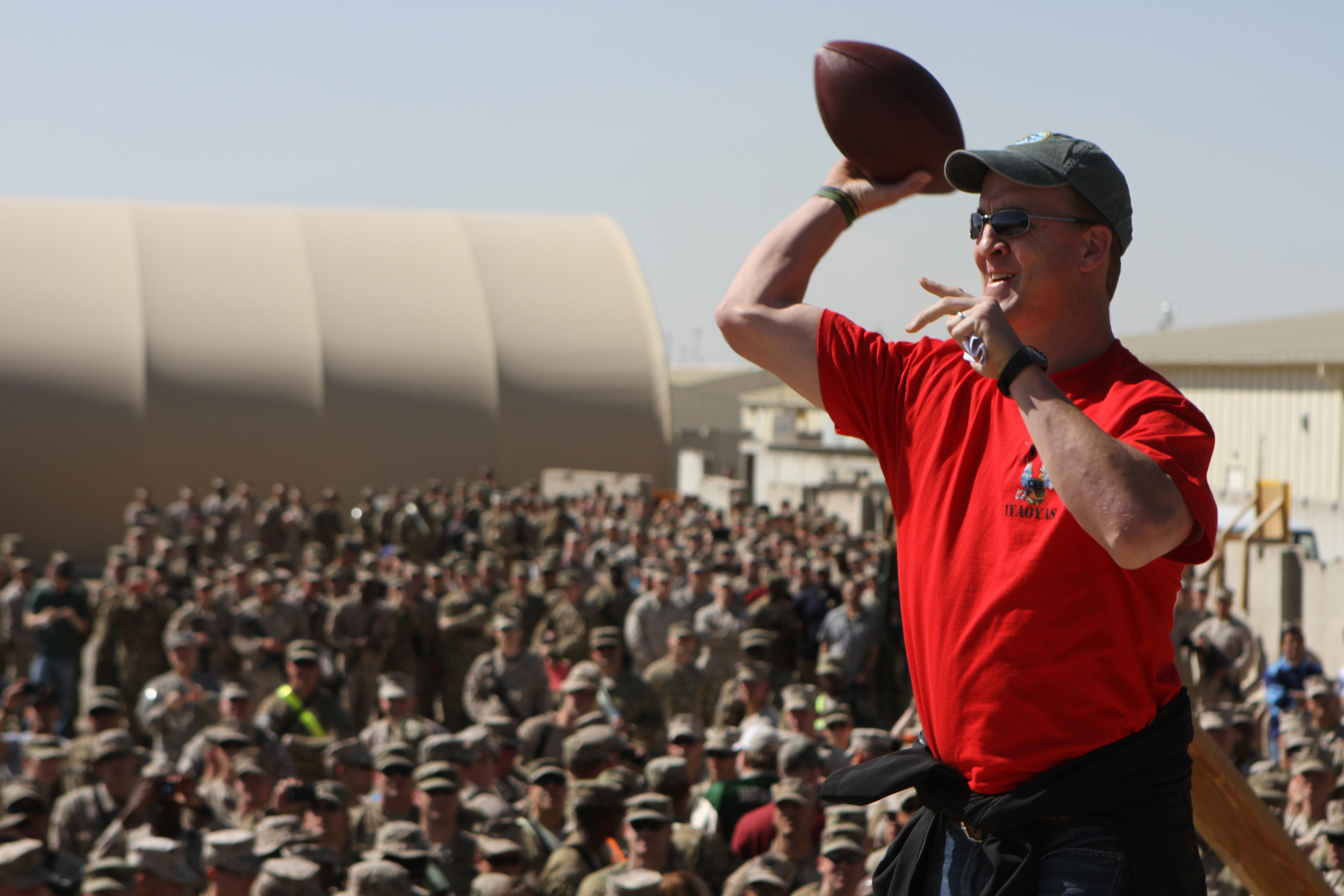
Manning in 2013

Shortly after beginning his NFL career, Manning started his own charity called the Peyback Foundation. The Peyback Foundation's mission is to help disadvantaged kids, and focuses its efforts in Louisiana, Tennessee, Indiana, and Colorado. For his work with the foundation, Manning received the Samuel S. Beard Award for Greatest Public Service by an Individual 35 Years or Under, which is given out annually by Jefferson Awards.

Manning, along with his brother Eli, volunteered their assistance in the wake of Hurricane Katrina. Among the tasks performed, the Mannings assisted in the delivery of 30,000 pounds of water, Gatorade, baby formula, diapers, and pillows to the people of New Orleans.

In September 2007, St. Vincent Hospital in Indianapolis renamed its children's hospital to Peyton Manning Children's Hospital at St. Vincent. Manning and his wife made a donation of an undisclosed amount to St. Vincent's and have a relationship with the hospital since he came to Indianapolis.

In 2022, the Peyback foundation teamed up with Georgia Tech to launch a scholarship in honor of Manning's former Broncos teammate Demaryius Thomas. The foundation also launched scholarships at six historically black colleges and universities.

In 2024, Manning was honored with the Mizel Institute Community Enrichment Award. In 2025, Manning donated $4 million to the University of Tennessee College of Communication and Information.

== See also ==
- Manning family
- Tom Brady–Peyton Manning rivalry
- List of first overall National Football League draft picks
- List of gridiron football quarterbacks passing statistics
- List of most consecutive starts by a National Football League quarterback
- List of NFL quarterbacks who have posted a perfect passer rating
- List of National Football League career passing completions leaders
- List of National Football League career quarterback wins leaders
- List of National Football League quarterback playoff records
- List of Super Bowl starting quarterbacks
- NFL players with most consecutive starts
- NFL players with the most consecutive games with at least one touchdown pass
