= Sunday Night Football =

Sunday Night Football may refer to:

- NBC Sunday Night Football, the Sunday night broadcast of American NFL games by NBC since 2006
- ESPN Sunday Night Football, the Sunday night broadcast of American NFL games from 1987 to 2005 by ESPN
- NFL on TNT, the Sunday night broadcast of American NFL games from 1990 to 1997 by TNT
- Sunday Night Football radio coverage on Westwood One
- Sunday Night Football (Australian TV program), an Australian football sports broadcast television program that aired on the Seven Network from 1991 to 2000 and again in 2014

== See also ==
- European Football Show, sometimes referred to as Sunday Night European Football
- Monday Night Football
- Thursday Night Football
