= Sunday Night Football (Australian TV program) =

- Genre: Sports broadcast
- Presented by: Bruce McAvaney (anchor)
- Starring: Dennis Cometti (commentator); Tom Harley (special comments); Leigh Matthews (special comments); Tim Watson (field commentator); Matthew Richardson (field commentator)
- Country of origin: Australia
- Original language: English
- No. of seasons: 11

Production
- Running time: 180 minutes

Original release
- Network: Seven Network (1991–2000, 2014); 7mate (2014); Fox Footy (Simulcasts)
- Release: 28 April 1991 – 9 April 2000; 6 April 2014 – 29 June 2014

Sunday Night Football is an Australian rules football sports broadcast television program that aired on the Seven Network on 28 April 1991 until 9 April 2000. It was returned to broadcast on Seven from 6 April 2014 until 29 June 2014 in VIC, SA, WA, TAS, and on 7mate from 6 April 2014 to 29 June 2014 in NSW & QLD.

== See also ==
- Friday Night Football
- Saturday Night Footy
- Seven Sport § Australian rules football
