= 2003 Wisconsin Badgers football team =

American college football season

2003 Wisconsin Badgers football

Music City Bowl, L 14–28 vs. Auburn
- Conference: Big Ten Conference
- Record: 7–6 (4–4 Big Ten)
- Head coach: Barry Alvarez (14th season)
- Offensive coordinator: Brian White (5th season)
- Offensive scheme: Multiple
- Defensive coordinator: Kevin Cosgrove (9th season)
- Base defense: 4–3
- MVP: Lee Evans
- Captains: Lee Evans; Jim Leonhard; Jeff Mack; Jim Sorgi
- Home stadium: Camp Randall Stadium

2003 Big Ten Conference football standings
| | Conf. | | | Overall |
| Team | W | | L | W | | L |
|---|---|---|---|---|---|---|
| No. 6 Michigan $ | 7 | – | 1 | 10 | – | 3 |
| No. 4 Ohio State % | 6 | – | 2 | 11 | – | 2 |
| No. 18 Purdue | 6 | – | 2 | 9 | – | 4 |
| No. 8 Iowa | 5 | – | 3 | 10 | – | 3 |
| No. 20 Minnesota | 5 | – | 3 | 10 | – | 3 |
| Michigan State | 5 | – | 3 | 8 | – | 5 |
| Wisconsin | 4 | – | 4 | 7 | – | 6 |
| Northwestern | 4 | – | 4 | 6 | – | 7 |
| Penn State | 1 | – | 7 | 3 | – | 9 |
| Indiana | 1 | – | 7 | 2 | – | 10 |
| Illinois | 0 | – | 8 | 1 | – | 11 |
% – BCS at-large representative; $ – Conference champion; Rankings from AP Poll

The 2003 Wisconsin Badgers football team was an American football team that represented the University of Wisconsin–Madison as a member of the Big Ten Conference during the 2003 NCAA Division I-A football season. In their 14th year under head coach Barry Alvarez, the Badgers compiled a 7–6 record (4–4 in conference games), finished in a tie for seventh place in the Big Ten, and outscored opponents by a total of 355 to 306. The Badgers defeated unranked West Virginia and Akron to open the season. In week 3, the Badgers, ranked No. 14, were upset by unranked UNLV, 23–5. They then won four consecutive games, including a 17–10 victory over No. 3 defending national champion Ohio State, breaking the Buckeyes' 19-game winning streak. They then lost five of their six final games, concluding with a 28–14 loss to unranked Auburn in the Music City Bowl. The Badgers were not ranked in the final polls.

Key players included:

- Wide receiver Lee Evans led the team in both receiving (64 catches for 1,213 yards) and scoring (78 points). Against Michigan State, he had 10 receptions for 258 yards and five touchdowns.
- Quarterback Jim Sorgi threw for 2,251 pasing yards and 17 touchdowns.
- Running back Dwayne Smith led the team with 857 rushing yards.
- Free safety Jim Leonhard led the Big Ten with seven interceptions. He also led the team with 63 solo tackles and 98 total tackles. Leonhard was selected by ESPN as a first-team All-American.

The team played its home games at Camp Randall Stadium in Madison, Wisconsin.

== Schedule ==
| Date | Time | Opponent | Rank | Site | TV | Result | Attendance |
|---|---|---|---|---|---|---|---|
| August 30 | 11:00 a.m. | at West Virginia* | No. 21 | Mountaineer Field; Morgantown, WV | ESPN | W 24–17 | 60,663 |
| September 6 | 2:30 p.m. | Akron* | No. 18 | Camp Randall Stadium; Madison, WI | ESPN Plus | W 48–31 | 75,401 |
| September 13 | 11:00 a.m. | UNLV* | No. 14 | Camp Randall Stadium; Madison, WI | ESPN2 | L 5–23 | 78,043 |
| September 20 | 11:00 a.m. | North Carolina* | | Camp Randall Stadium; Madison, WI | ESPN | W 38–27 | 77,439 |
| September 27 | 5:00 p.m. | at Illinois | | Memorial Stadium; Champaign, IL | ESPN2 | W 38–20 | 58,495 |
| October 4 | 11:00 a.m. | at Penn State | | Beaver Stadium; University Park, PA | ESPN | W 30–23 | 107,851 |
| October 11 | 8:00 p.m. | No. 3 Ohio State | No. 23 | Camp Randall Stadium; Madison, WI | ESPN | W 17–10 | 79,793 |
| October 18 | 11:00 a.m. | No. 13 Purdue^{†} | No. 14 | Camp Randall Stadium; Madison, WI (College GameDay) | ESPN | L 23–26 | 79,541 |
| October 25 | 11:00 a.m. | at Northwestern | No. 20 | Ryan Field; Evanston, IL | ESPN2 | L 7–16 | 36,233 |
| November 8 | 11:00 a.m. | at No. 24 Minnesota | | Hubert H. Humphrey Metrodome; Minneapolis, MN (rivalry) | ESPN | L 34–37 | 59,543 |
| November 15 | 11:00 a.m. | No. 21 Michigan State | | Camp Randall Stadium; Madison, WI | ESPN2 | W 56–21 | 79,256 |
| November 22 | 2:30 p.m. | No. 17 Iowa | | Camp Randall Stadium; Madison, WI (rivalry) | ABC | L 21–27 | 79,931 |
| December 31 | 11:00 a.m. | vs. Auburn* | | The Coliseum; Nashville, TN (Music City Bowl) | ESPN | L 14–28 | 55,109 |
*Non-conference game; ^{†}Homecoming; Rankings from AP Poll released prior to the game; All times are in Central time

== Game summaries ==
=== West Virginia ===
Wisconsin vs West Virginia – Game summary

| Quarter | 1 | 2 | 3 | 4 | Total |
|---|---|---|---|---|---|
| No. 21 Badgers | 7 | 0 | 3 | 14 | 24 |
| Mountaineers | 10 | 0 | 7 | 0 | 17 |

at Milan Puskar Stadium

- Date: August 30, 2003
- Game time: 11:00 a.m.
- Game weather: 73 °F (23 °C); Overcast; Wind at SW 10 MPH
- Game attendance: 60,663
- Referee: John Carson
- TV announcers (ESPN): Mark Jones (Play-by-play), Bob Davie (Color) & Holly Rowe (Sideline)

Game information

First quarter

- WIS – Kareem Timbers 0-yard blocked punt return (Scott Campbell kick), 13:44. Wisconsin 7–0.
- WVU – Quincy Wilson 10-yard TD run (Brad Cooper kick), 0:57. West Virginia 10–7. Drive: 13 plays, 80 yards, 5:45.

Second quarter

No scoring

Third quarter

- WVU – Quincy Wilson 2-yard TD run (Brad Cooper kick), 11:10. West Virginia 17–7. Drive: 7 plays, 66 yards, 2:20.
- WIS – Scott Campbell 29-yard field goal, 5:36. West Virginia 17–10. Drive: 11 plays, 69 yards, 5:34.

Fourth quarter

- WIS – Lee Evans 20-yard pass from Jim Sorgi (Scott Campbell kick), 13:02. Tie 17–17. Drive: 5 plays, 33 yards, 1:47.
- WIS – Anthony Davis 1-yard TD run (Scott Campbell kick), 2:57. Wisconsin 24–17. Drive: 7 plays, 67 yards, 2:20.

Top passers

- WVU – Rasheed Marshall – 10/16, 98 yards
- WIS – Jim Sorgi – 20/34, 215 yards, TD

Top rushers

- WVU – Quincy Wilson – 24 rushes, 99 yards, 2 TD
- WIS – Anthony Davis – 30 rushes, 167 yards, TD

Top receivers

- WVU – Aaron Neal – 4 receptions, 45 yards
- WIS – Lee Evans – 7 receptions, 70 yards, TD

Top defenders

- WVU – Mike Lorello – 12 tackles, 4 TFL
- WIS – Jim Leonhard – 10 tackles, TFL

=== Akron ===
Akron vs Wisconsin – Game summary

| Quarter | 1 | 2 | 3 | 4 | Total |
|---|---|---|---|---|---|
| Zips | 3 | 7 | 14 | 7 | 31 |
| No. 18 Badgers | 17 | 14 | 3 | 14 | 48 |

at Camp Randall Stadium

- Date: September 6, 2003
- Game time: 2:30 p.m.
- Game weather: 83 °F (28 °C); Clear; Wind at SW 10 MPH
- Game attendance: 75,401
- Referee: Steve Newman
- TV: ESPN+

Game information

First quarter

- AKR – Jason Swiger 30-yard field goal, 12:34. Akron 3–0. Drive: 7 plays, 17 yards, 2:20.
- WIS – Anthony Davis 10-yard TD run (Scott Campbell kick), 10:50. Wisconsin 7–3. Drive: 5 plays, 65 yards, 1:40.
- WIS – Anthony Davis 20-yard TD run (Scott Campbell kick), 1:45. Wisconsin 14–3. Drive: 12 plays, 80 yards, 5:01.
- WIS – Scott Campbell 27-yard field goal, 0:03. Wisconsin 17–3. Drive: 4 plays, -1 yards, 1:18.

Second quarter

- AKR – Jason Montgomery 30-yard pass from Charlie Frye (Jason Swiger kick), 12:21. Wisconsin 17–10. Drive: 8 plays, 84 yards, 2:39.
- WIS – Lee Evans 6-yard pass from Jim Sorgi (Scott Campbell kick), 9:59. Wisconsin 24–10. Drive: 6 plays, 72 yards, 2:17.
- WIS – Anthony Davis 14-yard TD run (Scott Campbell kick), 1:25. Wisconsin 31–10. Drive: 5 plays, 52 yards, 1:53.

Third quarter

- AKR – Bobby Hendry 2-yard TD run (Jason Swiger kick), 11:42. Wisconsin 31–17. Drive: 11 plays, 84 yards, 3:13.
- AKR – Charlie Frye 2-yard TD run (Jason Swiger kick), 6:15. Wisconsin 31–24. Drive: 9 plays, 76 yards, 3:14.
- WIS – Scott Campbell 35-yard field goal, 2:58. Wisconsin 34–24. Drive: 9 plays, 45 yards, 3:14.

Fourth quarter

- AKR – Dan Basch 7-yard TD run (Jason Swiger kick), 11:13. Wisconsin 34–31. Drive: 12 plays, 91 yards, 3:43.
- WIS – Lee Evans 99-yard pass from Jim Sorgi (Scott Campbell kick), 6:26. Wisconsin 41–31. Drive: 1 plays, 99 yards, 0:12.
- WIS – Dwayne Smith 34-yard TD run (Scott Campbell kick), 4:08. Wisconsin 48–31. Drive: 4 plays, 96 yards, 1:20.

Top passers

- AKR – Charlie Frye – 31/49, 372 yards, TD, 2 INT
- WIS – Jim Sorgi – 14/25, 281 yards, 2 TD, INT

Top rushers

- AKR – Bobby Hendry – 24 rushes, 101 yards, TD
- WIS – Anthony Davis – 29 rushes, 247 yards, 3 TD

Top receivers

- AKR – Jason Montgomery – 4 receptions, 67 yards, TD
- WIS – Lee Evans – 9 receptions, 214 yards, 2 TD

Top defenders

- AKR – Diontre Earl – 12 tackles, 2 TFL, sack
- WIS – Jeff Mack – 14 tackles, TFL, sack, QB hurry

=== UNLV ===
UNLV vs Wisconsin – Game summary

| Quarter | 1 | 2 | 3 | 4 | Total |
|---|---|---|---|---|---|
| Rebels | 10 | 6 | 7 | 0 | 23 |
| No. 14 Badgers | 0 | 5 | 0 | 0 | 5 |

at Camp Randall Stadium

- Date: September 13, 2003
- Game time: 11:00 a.m.
- Game weather: 69 °F (21 °C); Light rain; Wind at S 9 MPH
- Game attendance: 78,043
- Referee: Dave Witvoet
- TV: ESPN2

Game information

First quarter

- UNV – Dillon Pieffer 26-yard field goal, 8:51. UNLV 3–0. Drive: 6 plays, 17 yards, 1:43.
- UNV – Jamaal Brimmer 55-yard fumble return (Dillon Pieffer kick), 4:26. UNLV 10–0.

Second quarter

- WIS – Alex Lewis 13-yard safety, 14:55. UNLV 10–2.
- WIS – Scott Campbell 27-yard field goal, 13:04. UNLV 10–5. Drive: 5 plays, 41 yards, 1:51.
- UNV – Earvin Johnson 6-yard pass from Kurt Nantkes (Dillon Pieffer kick failed), 8:03. UNLV 16–5. Drive: 3 plays, 14 yards, 1:06.

Third quarter

- UNV – Earvin Johnson 8-yard pass from Kurt Nantkes (Dillon Pieffer kick), 12:14. UNLV 23–5. Drive: 3 plays, 24 yards, 1:22.

Fourth quarter

No scoring

Top passers

- UNV – Kurt Nantkes – 12/25, 93 yards, 2 TD
- WIS – Jim Sorgi – 11/25, 222 yards, 2 INT

Top rushers

- UNV – Dominique Dorsey – 26 rushes, 100 yards
- WIS – Dwayne Smith – 18 rushes, 92 yards

Top receivers

- UNV – Earvin Johnson – 5 receptions, 41 yards, 2 TD
- WIS – Brandon Williams – 6 receptions, 83 yards

Top defenders

- UNV – Jamaal Brimmer – 11 tackles, 2 TFL, 2 sacks, fumble recovery for TD, 2 INT
- WIS – Jeff Mack – 9 tackles, 0.5 TFL, pass breakup

=== North Carolina ===
North Carolina vs Wisconsin – Game summary

| Quarter | 1 | 2 | 3 | 4 | Total |
|---|---|---|---|---|---|
| Tar Heels | 7 | 10 | 3 | 7 | 27 |
| Badgers | 14 | 7 | 7 | 10 | 38 |

at Camp Randall Stadium

- Date: September 20, 2003
- Game time: 11:00 a.m.
- Game weather: 58 °F (14 °C); Clear; Wind at SE 6 MPH
- Game attendance: 77,439
- Referee: Jack Childress
- TV: ESPN

Game information

First quarter

- UNC – Michael Waddell 97-yard kickoff return (Dan Orner kick), 14:47. North Carolina 7–0.
- WIS – Stanley Booker 5-yard TD run (Mike Allen kick), 6:26. Tie 7–7. Drive: 7 plays, 46 yards, 3:03.
- WIS – Stanley Booker 1-yard TD run (Mike Allen kick), 1:20. Wisconsin 14–7. Drive: 3 plays, 3 yards, 1:21.

Second quarter

- UNC – Darian Durant 1-yard TD run (Dan Orner kick), 13:51. Tie 14–14. Drive: 8 plays, 50 yards, 2:22.
- WIS – Lee Evans 44-yard pass from Jim Sorgi (Mike Allen kick), 10:59. Wisconsin 21–14. Drive: 7 plays, 80 yards, 2:56.
- UNC – Dan Orner 25-yard field goal, 5:14. Wisconsin 21–17. Drive: 10 plays, 81 yards, 5:26.

Third quarter

- WIS – Stanley Booker 2-yard TD run (Mike Allen kick), 8:48. Wisconsin 28–17. Drive: 6 plays, 35 yards, 2:47.
- UNC – Dan Orner 51-yard field goal, 4:47. Wisconsin 28–20. Drive: 10 plays, 81 yards, 5:26.

Fourth quarter

- WIS – Darrin Charles 17-yard pass from Jim Sorgi (Mike Allen kick), 13:38. Wisconsin 35–20. Drive: 11 plays, 80 yards, 6:09.
- WIS – Mike Allen 20-yard field goal, 1:30. Wisconsin 38–20. Drive: 5 plays, 41 yards, 1:51.
- UNC – Jesse Holley 26-yard pass from C.J. Stephens (Dan Orner kick), 0:00. Wisconsin 38–27. Drive: 7 plays, 70 yards, 1:16.

Top passers

- UNC – Darian Durant – 12/24, 139 yards, INT
- WIS – Jim Sorgi – 12/20, 193 yards, 2 TD, 2 INT

Top rushers

- UNC – Jacque Lewis – 6 rushes, 82 yards
- WIS – Stanley Booker – 28 rushes, 119 yards, 3 TD

Top receivers

- UNC – Jarwarski Pollock – 5 receptions, 67 yards, 2 TD
- WIS – Lee Evans – 5 receptions, 80 yards, TD

Top defenders

- UNC – Mahlon Carey – 14 tackles, 2 INT
- WIS – Anttaj Hawthorne – 8 tackles, 3 TFL, forced fumble

=== Illinois ===
Wisconsin vs Illinois – Game summary

| Quarter | 1 | 2 | 3 | 4 | Total |
|---|---|---|---|---|---|
| Badgers | 14 | 7 | 7 | 10 | 38 |
| Fighting Illini | 0 | 10 | 10 | 0 | 20 |

at Memorial Stadium

- Date: September 27, 2003
- Game time: 5:00 p.m.
- Game weather: 65 °F (18 °C); Partly Cloudy; Wind at W 15 MPH
- Game attendance: 58,495
- Referee: Richard Honig
- TV: ESPN

Game information

First quarter

- WIS – Dwayne Smith 19-yard TD run (Mike Allen kick), 12:32. Wisconsin 7–0. Drive: 4 plays, 45 yards, 1:14.
- WIS – Dwayne Smith 2-yard TD run (Mike Allen kick), 8:02. Wisconsin 14–0. Drive: 9 plays, 68 yards, 3:04.

Second quarter

- WIS – Jim Sorgi 8-yard TD run (Mike Allen kick), 12:30. Wisconsin 21–0. Drive: 14 plays, 80 yards, 8:00.
- ILL – John Gockman 27-yard field goal, 10:54. Wisconsin 21–3. Drive: 4 plays, 14 yards, 1:36.
- ILL – Ibrahim Halsey 4-yard pass from Jon Beutjer (John Gockman kick), 0:32. Wisconsin 21–10. Drive: 18 plays, 75 yards, 6:32.

Third quarter

- ILL – John Gockman 47-yard field goal, 13:14. Wisconsin 21–13. Drive: 4 plays, -5 yards, 0:19.
- WIS – Dwayne Smith 5-yard TD run (Mike Allen kick), 9:19. Wisconsin 28–13. Drive: 2 plays, 80 yards, 0:16.
- ILL – Ibrahim Halsey 4-yard TD run (John Gockman kick), 5:14. Wisconsin 28–20. Drive: 10 plays, 68 yards, 4:05.

Fourth quarter

- WIS – Jim Sorgi 4-yard TD run (Mike Allen kick), 12:59. Wisconsin 35–20. Drive: 14 plays, 69 yards, 7:15.
- WIS – Mike Allen 18-yard field goal, 3:54. Wisconsin 38–20. Drive: 12 plays, 75 yards, 7:12.

Top passers

- ILL – Jon Beutjer – 23/41, 207 yards, TD, INT
- WIS – Jim Sorgi – 7/12, 131 yards

Top rushers

- ILL – Ibrahim Halsey – 10 rushes, 43 yards, TD
- WIS – Dwayne Smith – 34 rushes, 193 yards, 3 TD

Top receivers

- ILL – Kelvin Hayden – 9 receptions, 97 yards
- WIS – Lee Evans – 4 receptions, 45 yards

Top defenders

- ILL – Matt Sinclair – 21 tackles
- WIS – Jeff Mack – 9 tackles

=== Penn State ===
Wisconsin vs Penn State – Game summary

| Quarter | 1 | 2 | 3 | 4 | Total |
|---|---|---|---|---|---|
| Badgers | 7 | 10 | 6 | 7 | 30 |
| Nittany Lions | 3 | 6 | 7 | 7 | 23 |

at Beaver Stadium

- Date: October 4, 2003
- Game time: 11:00 a.m.
- Game weather: 52 °F (11 °C); Rainy; Wind at SW 10-20 MPH
- Game attendance: 107,851
- Referee: D. Lipski
- TV: ESPN

Game information

First quarter

- PSU – Robbie Gould 35-yard field goal, 9:15. Penn State 3–0. Drive: 4 plays, 6 yards, 0:21.
- WIS – Lee Evans 30-yard pass from Jim Sorgi (Mike Allen kick), 5:27. Wisconsin 7–3. Drive: 7 plays, 80 yards, 3:48.

Second quarter

- PSU – Sean McHugh 1-yard TD run (TEAM kick failed), 13:12. Penn State 9–7. Drive: 15 plays, 74 yards, 7:15.
- WIS – Mike Allen 46-yard field goal, 10:42. Wisconsin 10–9. Drive: 6 plays, 17 yards, 2:36.
- WIS – Brandon Williams 20-yard pass from Jim Sorgi (Mike Allen kick), 0:11. Wisconsin 17–9. Drive: 4 plays, 23 yards, 0:25.

Third quarter

- WIS – Jim Leonhard 65-yard punt return (Mike Allen kick failed), 2:17. Wisconsin 23–9.
- PSU – Matt Kranchick 73-yard pass from Michael Robinson (Robbie Gould kick), 1:44. Wisconsin 23–16. Drive: 3 plays, 80 yards, 0:33.

Fourth quarter

- WIS – Stanley Booker 6-yard TD run (Mike Allen kick), 9:42. Wisconsin 30–16. Drive: 13 plays, 80 yards, 7:02.
- PSU – Gerald Smith 5-yard pass from Michael Robinson (Robbie Gould kick), 8:43. Wisconsin 30–23. Drive: 4 plays, 70 yards, 0:59.

Top passers

- PSU – Michael Robinson – 22/43, 379 yards, 2 TD
- WIS – Jim Sorgi – 9/26, 140 yards, 2 TD

Top rushers

- PSU – Austin Scott – 10 rushes, 22 yards
- WIS – Stanley Booker – 24 rushes, 119 yards, TD

Top receivers

- PSU – Matt Kranchick – 4 receptions, 136 yards, TD
- WIS – Brandon Williams – 3 receptions, 60 yards, TD

Top defenders

- PSU – Derek Wake – 9 tackles, 2.5 TFL, sack
- WIS – Alex Lewis – 11 tackles, 1.5 TFL, forced fumble

=== Ohio State ===
Ohio State vs Wisconsin – Game summary

| Quarter | 1 | 2 | 3 | 4 | Total |
|---|---|---|---|---|---|
| No. 3 Buckeyes | 0 | 3 | 0 | 7 | 10 |
| No. 23 Badgers | 0 | 7 | 3 | 7 | 17 |

at Camp Randall Stadium

- Date: October 11, 2003
- Game time: 8:00 p.m.
- Game weather: 72 °F (22 °C); Light Rain; Wind at S 15 MPH
- Game attendance: 79,793
- Referee: Dave Witvoet
- TV announcers (ESPN): Ron Franklin (Play-by-play), Mike Gottfried (Color) & Adrian Karsten (Sideline)

Game information

First quarter

No scoring

Second quarter

- WIS – Stanley Booker 2-yard TD run (Mike Allen kick), 14:54. Wisconsin 7–0. Drive: 13 plays, 63 yards, 7:26.
- OSU – Mike Nugent 24-yard field goal, 4:02. Wisconsin 7–3. Drive: 8 plays, 12 yards, 2:55.

Third quarter

- WIS – Mike Allen 38-yard field goal, 5:09. Wisconsin 10–3. Drive: 6 plays, 18 yards, 3:10.

Fourth quarter

- OSU – Michael Jenkins 6-yard pass from Craig Krenzel (Mike Nugent kick), 6:09. Tie 10–10. Drive: 7 plays, 75 yards, 2:05.
- WIS – Lee Evans 79-yard pass from Matt Schabert (Mike Allen kick), 5:20. Wisconsin 17–10. Drive: 2 plays, 80 yards, 0:49.

Top passers

- OSU – Craig Krenzel – 14/26, 202 yards, TD, INT
- WIS – Matt Schabert – 2/3, 104 yards, TD

Top rushers

- OSU – Lydell Ross – 7 rushes, 28 yards
- WIS – Stanley Booker – 31 rushes, 125 yards, TD

Top receivers

- OSU – Drew Carter – 3 receptions, 90 yards
- WIS – Lee Evans – 1 receptions, 79 yards, TD

Top defenders

- OSU – Robert Reynolds – 12 tackles, 2.5 TFL
- WIS – Jonathan Welsh – 6 tackles, TFL, sack, forced fumble, QB hurry

=== Purdue ===
Purdue vs Wisconsin – Game summary

| Quarter | 1 | 2 | 3 | 4 | Total |
|---|---|---|---|---|---|
| No. 13 Boilermakers | 14 | 3 | 3 | 6 | 26 |
| No. 14 Badgers | 7 | 6 | 0 | 10 | 23 |

at Camp Randall Stadium

- Date: October 18, 2003
- Game time: 11:00 a.m.
- Game weather: 57 °F (14 °C); Clear; Wind at W 5-10 MPH
- Game attendance: 79,541
- Referee: Steve Newman
- TV: ESPN

Game information

First quarter

- PUR – Jerod Void 2-yard TD run (Ben Jones kick), 12:50. Purdue 7–0. Drive: 7 plays, 59 yards, 1:57.
- PUR – Taylor Stubblefield 6-yard pass from Kyle Orton (Ben Jones kick), 5:31. Purdue 14–0. Drive: 9 plays, 70 yards, 5:05.
- WIS – Anthony Davis 28-yard TD run (Mike Allen kick), 3:14. Purdue 14–7. Drive: 6 plays, 62 yards, 2:08.

Second quarter

- WIS – Jeff Mack 55-yard fumble return (Mike Allen kick failed), 13:45. Purdue 14–13.
- PUR – Ben Jones 42-yard field goal, 4:11. Purdue 17–13. Drive: 14 plays, 51 yards, 4:59.

Third quarter

- PUR – Ben Jones 20-yard field goal, 10:16. Purdue 20–13. Drive: 18 plays, 71 yards, 4:39.

Fourth quarter

- WIS – Mike Allen 25-yard field goal, 9:42. Purdue 20–16. Drive: 10 plays, 69 yards, 3:27.
- PUR – Ben Jones 26-yard field goal, 8:15. Purdue 23–16. Drive: 6 plays, 68 yards, 1:21.
- WIS – Jim Leonhard 63-yard punt return (Mike Allen kick), 2:55. Tie 23–23.
- PUR – Ben Jones 18-yard field goal, 0:03. Purdue 26–23. Drive: 11 plays, 82 yards, 2:45.

Top passers

- PUR – Kyle Orton – 38/55, 411 yards, TD
- WIS – Jim Sorgi – 6/9, 118 yards, INT

Top rushers

- PUR – Jerod Void – 11 rushes, 44 yards, TD
- WIS – Anthony Davis – 18 rushes, 96 yards, TD

Top receivers

- PUR – Taylor Stubblefield – 16 receptions, 130 yards, TD
- WIS – Lee Evans – 3 receptions, 76 yards

Top defenders

- PUR – Stuart Schweigert – 11 tackles, 2 TFL, 2 sacks
- WIS – Alex Lewis – 9 tackles, 6.5 TFL, 5 sacks, forced fumble

=== Northwestern ===
Wisconsin vs Northwestern – Game summary

| Quarter | 1 | 2 | 3 | 4 | Total |
|---|---|---|---|---|---|
| No. 20 Badgers | 0 | 7 | 0 | 0 | 7 |
| Wildcats | 6 | 3 | 7 | 0 | 16 |

at Ryan Field

- Date: October 25, 2003
- Game time: 11:00 a.m.
- Game weather: 54 °F (12 °C); Cloudy; Wind at W 6 MPH
- Game attendance: 36,233
- Referee: Richard Honig
- TV: ESPN2

Game information

First quarter

- NU – Jason Wright 53-yard pass from Brett Basanez (Joel Howells kick blocked), 3:42. Northwestern 6–0. Drive: 4 plays, 80 yards, 1:06.

Second quarter

- WIS – Dwayne Smith 18-yard TD run (Scott Campbell kick), 6:55. Wisconsin 7–6. Drive: 7 plays, 52 yards, 2:49.
- NU – Brian Huffman 25-yard field goal, 1:44. Northwestern 9–7. Drive: 12 plays, 82 yards, 5:11.

Third quarter

- NU – Jason Wright 1-yard TD run (Brian Huffman kick), 2:08. Northwestern 16–7. Drive: 11 plays, 80 yards, 4:20.

Fourth quarter

No scoring

Top passers

- NU – Brett Basanez – 10/23, 176 yards, TD, 2 INT
- WIS – Matt Schabert – 20/36, 193 yards, INT

Top rushers

- NU – Jason Wright – 18 rushes, 97 yards, TD
- WIS – Dwayne Smith – 10 rushes, 31 yards, TD

Top receivers

- NU – Jason Wright – 1 receptions, 53 yards, TD
- WIS – Lee Evans – 6 receptions, 90 yards

Top defenders

- NU – Tim McGarigle – 14 tackles, INT
- WIS – Jim Leonhard – 19 tackles, 1.5 TFL, sack, INT

=== Minnesota ===
Wisconsin vs Minnesota – Game summary

| Quarter | 1 | 2 | 3 | 4 | Total |
|---|---|---|---|---|---|
| Badgers | 3 | 10 | 14 | 7 | 34 |
| No. 24 Golden Gophers | 10 | 14 | 3 | 10 | 37 |

at Hubert H. Humphrey Metrodome

- Date: November 8, 2003
- Game time: 11:00 a.m.
- Game weather: 72 °F (22 °C); Dome
- Game attendance: 59,543
- Referee: Bill LeMonnier
- TV: ESPN

Game information

First quarter

- MIN – Laurence Maroney 30-yard TD run (Rhys Lloyd kick), 14:04. Minnesota 7–0. Drive: 3 plays, 66 yards, 0:56.
- MIN – Rhys Lloyd 34-yard field goal, 7:56. Minnesota 10–0. Drive: 14 plays, 52 yards, 4:27.
- WIS – Mike Allen 27-yard field goal, 0:13. Minnesota 10–3. Drive: 17 plays, 75 yards, 7:43.

Second quarter

- MIN – Asad Abdul-Khaliq 13-yard TD run (Rhys Lloyd kick), 10:52. Minnesota 17–3. Drive: 11 plays, 75 yards, 4:21.
- WIS – Mike Allen 23-yard field goal, 4:54. Minnesota 17–6. Drive: 12 plays, 76 yards, 5:58.
- MIN – Thomas Tapeh 6-yard TD run (Rhys Lloyd kick), 2:01. Minnesota 24–6. Drive: 8 plays, 79 yards, 2:53.
- WIS – Owen Daniels 27-yard pass from Jim Sorgi (Mike Allen kick), 1:25. Minnesota 24–13. Drive: 5 plays, 65 yards, 0:36.

Third quarter

- WIS – Lee Evans 17-yard pass from Jim Sorgi (Mike Allen kick), 12:47. Minnesota 24–20. Drive: 5 plays, 65 yards, 0:36.
- MIN – Rhys Lloyd 34-yard field goal, 9:17. Minnesota 27–20. Drive: 7 plays, 60 yards, 3:30.
- WIS – Darrin Charles 12-yard pass from Jim Sorgi (Mike Allen kick), 1:35. Tie 27–27. Drive: 8 plays, 69 yards, 4:56.

Fourth quarter

- MIN – Marion Barber III 11-yard TD run (Rhys Lloyd kick), 11:13. Minnesota 34–27. Drive: 7 plays, 60 yards, 2:33.
- WIS – Owen Daniels 26-yard pass from Jim Sorgi (Mike Allen kick), 7:15. Tie 34–34. Drive: 9 plays, 80 yards, 3:58.
- MIN – Rhys Lloyd 35-yard field goal, 0:00. Minnesota 37–34. Drive: 11 plays, 62 yards, 2:49.

Top passers

- MIN – Benji Kamrath – 6/10, 93 yards
- WIS – Jim Sorgi – 23/34, 305 yards, 4 TD, INT

Top rushers

- MIN – Marion Barber III – 27 rushes, 139 yards, TD
- WIS – Stanley Booker – 20 rushes, 68 yards

Top receivers

- MIN – Jared Ellerson – 3 receptions, 68 yards
- WIS – Owen Daniels – 3 receptions, 70 yards, 2 TD

Top defenders

- MIN – Ben West – 11 tackles, 2 TFL, sack
- WIS – Jim Leonhard – 11 tackles, TFL

=== Michigan State ===
Michigan State vs Wisconsin – Game summary

| Quarter | 1 | 2 | 3 | 4 | Total |
|---|---|---|---|---|---|
| No. 21 Spartans | 0 | 7 | 7 | 7 | 21 |
| Badgers | 14 | 14 | 21 | 7 | 56 |

at Camp Randall Stadium

- Date: November 15, 2003
- Game time: 11:00 a.m.
- Game weather: 40 °F (4 °C); Dome
- Game attendance: 79,256
- Referee: Stave Pamon
- TV announcers (ESPN): Pam Ward (Play-by-play) & Chris Spielman (Color)

Game information

First quarter

- WIS – Lee Evans 9-yard pass from Jim Sorgi (Mike Allen kick), 11:22. Wisconsin 7–0. Drive: 9 plays, 65 yards, 3:38.
- WIS – Dwayne Smith 3-yard TD run (Mike Allen kick), 0:27. Wisconsin 14–0. Drive: 5 plays, 54 yards, 1:30.

Second quarter

- WIS – Lee Evans 75-yard pass from Jim Sorgi (Mike Allen kick), 4:21. Wisconsin 21–0. Drive: 8 plays, 88 yards, 2:35.
- MSU – Kyle Brown 21-yard pass from Jeff Smoker (Dave Rayner kick), 2:51. Wisconsin 21–7. Drive: 3 plays, 25 yards, 1:20.
- WIS – Lee Evans 18-yard pass from Jim Sorgi (Mike Allen kick), 1:39. Wisconsin 28–7. Drive: 3 plays, 81 yards, 1:06.

Third quarter

- WIS – Lee Evans 70-yard pass from Jim Sorgi (Mike Allen kick), 9:13. Wisconsin 35–7. Drive: 1 plays, 70 yards, 0:12.
- MSU – Aaron Alexander 30-yard pass from Jeff Smoker (Dave Rayner kick), 7:49. Wisconsin 35–14. Drive: 5 plays, 64 yards, 1:18.
- WIS – Lee Evans 18-yard pass from Jim Sorgi (Mike Allen kick), 4:05. Wisconsin 42–14. Drive: 7 plays, 62 yards, 3:41.
- WIS – Dwayne Smith 14-yard TD run (Mike Allen kick), 1:32. Wisconsin 49–14. Drive: 3 plays, 53 yards, 1:20.

Fourth quarter

- WIS – Dwayne Smith 26-yard TD run (Mike Allen kick), 13:11. Wisconsin 56–14. Drive: 2 plays, 35 yards, 0:45.
- MSU – Drew Stanton 13-yard TD run (Dave Rayner kick), 4:56. Wisconsin 56–21. Drive: 10 plays, 96 yards, 4:07.

Top passers

- MSU – Jeff Smoker – 16/31, 207 yards, 2 TD, 2 INT
- WIS – Jim Sorgi – 16/24, 380 yards, 5 TD

Top rushers

- MSU – DeAndra' Cobb – 16 rushes, 88 yards
- WIS – Dwayne Smith – 21 rushes, 207 yards, 3 TD

Top receivers

- MSU – Aaron Alexander – 2 receptions, 43 yards, TD
- WIS – Lee Evans – 10 receptions, 258 yards, 5 TD

Top defenders

- MSU – Seth Mitchell – 11 tackles, 1.5 TFL
- WIS – Alex Lewis – 6 tackles, 3.5 TFL, 2 sacks, forced fumble, 2 QB hurries

=== Iowa ===
Iowa vs Wisconsin – Game summary

| Quarter | 1 | 2 | 3 | 4 | Total |
|---|---|---|---|---|---|
| No. 17 Hawkeyes | 7 | 10 | 7 | 3 | 27 |
| Badgers | 14 | 7 | 0 | 0 | 21 |

at Camp Randall Stadium

- Date: November 22, 2003
- Game time: 2:30 p.m.
- Game weather: 38 °F (3 °C); Drizzle; Wind at NE 13 MPH
- Game attendance: 79,931
- Referee: Dennis Lipski
- TV announcers (ABC): Tim Brant (Play-by-play) & Ed Cunningham (Color)

Game information

First quarter

- IOW – Ramon Ochoa 18-yard TD run (Nate Kaeding kick), 11:05. Iowa 7–0. Drive: 3 plays, 66 yards, 0:55.
- WIS – Anthony Davis 1-yard TD run (Mike Allen kick), 7:32. Tie 7–7. Drive: 2 plays, 5 yards, 0:42.
- WIS – Anthony Davis 4-yard TD run (Mike Allen kick), 0:15. Wisconsin 14–7. Drive: 10 plays, 80 yards, 4:55.

Second quarter

- WIS – Dwayne Smith 1-yard TD run (Mike Allen kick), 10:08. Wisconsin 21–7. Drive: 6 plays, 36 yards, 2:46.
- IOW – Ramon Ochoa 6-yard pass from Nathan Chandler (Nate Kaeding kick), 4:42. Wisconsin 21–14. Drive: 6 plays, 26 yards, 2:40.
- IOW – Nate Kaeding 50-yard field goal, 0:11. Wisconsin 21–17. Drive: 6 plays, 18 yards, 0:28.

Third quarter

- IOW – Fred Russell 1-yard TD run (Nate Kaeding kick), 2:11. Iowa 24–21. Drive: 1 plays, 1 yards, 0:05.

Fourth quarter

- IOW – Nate Kaeding 28-yard field goal, 13:59. Iowa 27–21. Drive: 5 plays, 33 yards, 1:49.

Top passers

- IOW – Nathan Chandler – 8/26, 66 yards, TD, 2 INT
- WIS – John Stocco – 5/9, 84 yards

Top rushers

- IOW – Fred Russell – 18 rushes, 137 yards, TD
- WIS – Dwayne Smith – 29 rushes, 119 yards, TD

Top receivers

- IOW – Ramon Ochoa – 2 receptions, 15 yards, TD
- WIS – Lee Evans – 4 receptions, 76 yards

Top defenders

- IOW – Chad Greenway – 11 tackles, 0.5 TFL, pass breakup
- WIS – Kyle McCorison – 10 tackles, 2.5 TFL, sack, INT, 2 QB hurries

=== Auburn ===
Wisconsin vs Auburn – Game summary

| Quarter | 1 | 2 | 3 | 4 | Total |
|---|---|---|---|---|---|
| Badgers | 0 | 6 | 0 | 8 | 14 |
| Tigers | 0 | 7 | 7 | 14 | 28 |

at The Coliseum

- Date: December 31, 2003
- Game time: 11:00 a.m.
- Game weather: 50 °F (10 °C); Mostly sunny; Wind at Var. 7 MPH
- Game attendance: 55,109
- Referee: Jack Childress
- TV: ESPN

Game information

First quarter

No scoring

Second quarter

- WIS – Mike Allen 20-yard field goal, 9:44. Wisconsin 3–0. Drive: 14 plays, 65 yards, 6:58.
- AUB – Ronnie Brown 1-yard TD run (John Vaughn kick), 4:37. Auburn 7–0. Drive: 10 plays, 79 yards, 5:07.
- WIS – Mike Allen 35-yard field goal, 2:42. Auburn 7–6. Drive: 6 plays, 57 yards, 1:55.

Third quarter

- AUB – Cadillac Williams 1-yard TD run (John Vaughn kick), 1:32. Auburn 14–6. Drive: 16 plays, 80 yards, 7:16.

Fourth quarter

- WIS – Lee Evans 12-yard pass from Jim Sorgi (Owen Daniels catch), 8:52. Tie 14–14. Drive: 8 plays, 52 yards, 3:57.
- AUB – Ronnie Brown 2-yard TD run (John Vaughn kick), 3:30. Auburn 21–14. Drive: 6 plays, 87 yards, 2:16.
- AUB – Cadillac Williams 1-yard TD run (John Vaughn kick), 1:37. Auburn 28–14. Drive: 2 plays, 6 yards, 1:00.

Top passers

- AUB – Jason Campbell – 10/22, 138 yards, INT
- WIS – Jim Sorgi – 13/22, 169 yards, TD, INT

Top rushers

- AUB – Cadillac Williams – 18 rushes, 68 yards, 2 TD
- WIS – Anthony Davis – 17 rushes, 77 yards

Top receivers

- AUB – Jeris McIntyre – 3 receptions, 74 yards
- WIS – Lee Evans – 4 receptions, 51 yards, TD

Top defenders

- AUB – Karlos Dansby – 10 tackles, 1.5 TFL, 1.5 sacks, 2 forced fumbles, pass breakup
- WIS – Alex Lewis – 10 tackles, 1.5 TFL, sack

== Personnel ==
=== Roster ===
2003 Wisconsin Badgers football team roster
Players
Coaches
Offense

| Pos. | # | Name | Class |
|---|---|---|---|
| G | 58 | Kalvin Barrett | Jr |
| TE | 88 | Mark Bell | Jr |
| FB | 45 | Matt Bernstein | So |
| WR | 1 | Byron Brown | Sr |
| G | 67 | Dan Buenning | Jr |
| WR | 87 | Darrin Charles | Jr |
| G | 50 | Jonathan Clinkscale | Jr |
| WR | 11 | Owen Daniels | So |
| RB | 28 | Anthony Davis | Jr |
| OT | 75 | Morgan Davis | Jr |
| WR | 3 | Lee Evans (C) | Sr |
| WR | 26 | Zach Hampton | Fr |
| WR | 13 | Travann Hayes | Jr |
| WR | 29 | Paul Hubbard | Fr |
| G | 76 | Matt Lawrence | So |
| OT | 61 | Mike Lorenz | Jr |
| WR | 7 | Ernest Mason | Fr |
| OT | 68 | Fred Nieforth | Sr |
| TE | 84 | Jason Pociask | So |
| WR | 9 | Jonathan Orr | So |
| TE | 85 | Tony Paciotti | Jr |
| C | 52 | Jason Palermo | So |
| RB | 20 | Jerrone Pettus | Jr |
| TE | 84 | Jason Pociask | So |
| C | 53 | Donovan Raiola | So |
| FB | 37 | Greg Root | So |
| QB | 16 | Matt Schabert | Jr |
| RB | 30 | Dwayne Smith | So |
| QB | 19 | Jim Sorgi (C) | Sr |
| RB | 32 | Booker Stanley | Fr |
| QB | 2 | John Stocco | Fr |
| WR | 15 | Luke Swan | Fr |
| OT | 72 | Joe Thomas | Fr |
| WR | 8 | Brandon White | So |
| WR | 25 | Brandon Williams | So |
| OT | 78 | Jake Wood | So |

Defense

| Pos. | # | Name | Class |
|---|---|---|---|
| S | 7 | Ryan Aiello | Sr |
| CB | 6 | Brett Bell (injured) | Jr |
| S | 42 | Robert Brooks | Jr |
| LB | 10 | Chris Catalano | Jr |
| LB | 56 | Jason Clemens | Sr |
| DT | 97 | Nick Cochart | Sr |
| CB | 4 | Chuckie Cowans | Jr |
| S | 44 | Patrick Ellestad | Jr |
| DT | 73 | Matt Gajda | Sr |
| LB | 47 | Elliot Goode | So |
| DT | 77 | Anttaj Hawthorne | Jr |
| DE | 90 | Erasmus James | Sr |
| DT | 74 | Jason Jefferson | Jr |
| DE | 98 | Darius Jones | Jr |
| S | 18 | Jim Leonhard (C) | Jr |
| LB | 12 | Alex Lewis | Sr |
| DE | 91 | Traison Lewis | Jr |
| LB | 46 | Jeff Mark (C) | Sr |
| LB | 43 | Kyle McCorison | Sr |
| DE | 95 | Joe Monty | Fr |
| DB | 22 | Roderick Rogers | Fr |
| CB | 21 | Levonne Rowan | So |
| S | 14 | Dontez Sanders | So |
| CB | 2 | Scott Starks | Jr |
| S | 16 | Joe Stellmacher | Fr |
| LB | 34 | Kareem Timbers | Jr |
| LB | 24 | LaMarr Watkins | So |
| DE | 92 | Jonathan Welsh | Jr |
| LB | 41 | Mark Zalewski | Fr |

Special teams

| Pos. | # | Name | Class |
|---|---|---|---|
| K | 99 | Mike Allen | Jr |
| K | 29 | Scott Campbell | Sr |
| P | 94 | Ken DeBauche | Fr |
| LS | 86 | Matt Katula | Jr |
| P | 31 | R. J. Morse | Jr |

Head coach

- Barry Alvarez

Coordinators/assistant coaches

- Brian White – Offensive Coordinator/Running Backs
- Kevin Cosgrove – Defensive Coordinator/Inside Linebackers
- Jeff Horton – Quarterbacks
- Jim Hueber – Offensive Line and Run Game Coordinator
- Rob Ianello – Tight Ends
- Ron Lee – Defensive Backs
- Henry Mason – Wide Receivers
- Brian Murphy – Outside Linebackers/Special Teams
- John Palermo – Assistant Head Coach/Defensive Line

Legend

- (C) Team captain
- (S) Suspended
- (I) Ineligible
- Injured
- Redshirt

Roster

=== Regular starters ===
| Position | Player |
|---|---|
| Quarterback | Jim Sorgi |
| Running back | Anthony Davis |
| Fullback | Matt Bernstein |
| Wide receiver | Lee Evans |
| Wide receiver | Brandon Williams |
| Tight end | Tony Paciotti |
| Left tackle | Morgan Davis |
| Left guard | Dan Buenning |
| Center | Donovan Raiola |
| Right guard | Jonathan Clinkscale |
| Right tackle | Mike Lorenz |

| Position | Player |
|---|---|
| Defensive end | Darius Jones |
| Defensive tackle | Anttaj Hawthorne |
| Defensive tackle | Jason Jefferson |
| Defensive end | Jonathan Welsh |
| Outside linebacker | Jeff Mack |
| Inside linebacker | Alex Lewis |
| Outside linebacker | Kareem Timbers |
| Cornerback | Scott Starks |
| Strong safety | Ryan Aiello |
| Free safety | Jim Leonhard |
| Cornerback | Levonne Rowan |

== 2004 NFL draft ==
| Player | Position | Round | Overall Selection | NFL team |
|---|---|---|---|---|
| Lee Evans | Wide Receiver | 1 | 13 | Buffalo Bills |
| Alex Lewis | Linebacker | 5 | 140 | Detroit Lions |
| Jim Sorgi | Quarterback | 6 | 193 | Indianapolis Colts |
