= 2005 Indianapolis Colts season =

53rd season in franchise history

- Owner: Jim Irsay
- General manager: Bill Polian
- Head coach: Tony Dungy
- Home stadium: RCA Dome

Results
- Record: 14–2
- Division place: 1st AFC South
- Playoffs: Lost Divisional Playoffs (vs. Steelers) 18–21
- Pro Bowlers: QB Peyton Manning; RB Edgerrin James; WR Marvin Harrison; OT Tarik Glenn; C Jeff Saturday; DE Dwight Freeney; OLB Cato June; FS Bob Sanders

Uniform
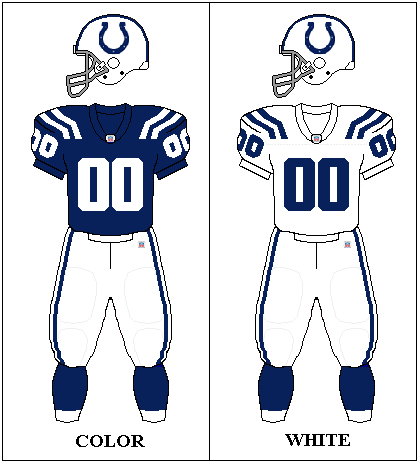

The 2005 Indianapolis Colts season was the franchise's 53rd season in the National Football League (NFL), the 22nd in Indianapolis and the fourth season under head coach Tony Dungy. The Colts improved on their 12–4 record from 2004 and finished the season 14–2. Indianapolis started the season with a 13-game winning streak and were heavily favored to go to and win Super Bowl XL. The Colts' rival, the New England Patriots, lost to the Denver Broncos in the Divisional round of the playoffs. The following day, the Colts were favored over the Pittsburgh Steelers because they had easily beaten them in their previous meeting. However, the Colts lost their first playoff game in heartbreaking fashion to the eventual Super Bowl champion Steelers, when kicker Mike Vanderjagt missed a crucial field goal.

The 2005 Colts set an NFL record by winning twelve games in which they never trailed at any point in the contest and still stands as of today. (Note: Record still stands as of the 2023 season; the previous record-holder was the 1978 Miami Dolphins, who had 11 such games.)

The 2005 Colts were the first team to start the season with 13 straight wins and lose an opening playoff game, although this would be repeated by the 2011 Green Bay Packers. They were also the first team to start the season with 13 straight wins and not win the Super Bowl, although this would be repeated by the 2007 New England Patriots who went 16–0 in the regular season, the Colts again in 2009 when they started 14–0 and went 14–2, the 2011 Green Bay Packers who started 13–0 and went 15–1, and by the 2015 Carolina Panthers who began the season 14–0 and went 15–1.

The Colts would, however, win the Super Bowl the next year with a 12–4 record over the Chicago Bears with a score of 29–17.

This was also the last season the Colts started games at different local times with other teams in the Eastern Time Zone, as the State of Indiana began observing Daylight Saving Time in 2006.

== Offseason ==
The Colts had a busy offseason with the main focus to sign star running back Edgerrin James to a new contract. However, that did not happen, and the Colts decided to take the initiative of sticking him with the franchise tag . (The franchise tag is a way to keep a player on the roster for one more year, but for a much larger salary than specified on the contract.) The Colts also signed RT Ryan Diem to a seven-year contract that included a $12 million signing bonus, which made him one of the highest-paid offensive tackles in the league.

The Colts were not able to re-sign TE Marcus Pollard (Detroit Lions, free agent) or DE Brad Scioli (free-agent) during the offseason.

== 2005 NFL draft ==
2005 Indianapolis Colts Draft Selections
Round	Pick	Player	Position	Height	Weight	College
1	29	Marlin Jackson	CB	6–0	196	Michigan
2	60	Kelvin Hayden	CB	6–0	195	Illinois
3	92	Vincent Burns	DT	6–2	260	Kentucky
4	129	Dylan Gandy	G	6–3	302	Texas Tech
4	135	Matt Giordano	SS	5–11	192	California
5	148	Jonathan Welsh	DE	6–4	235	Wisconsin
5	165	Rob Hunt	C	6–3	298	North Dakota State
5	173	Tyjuan Hagler	OLB	6–0	236	Cincinnati
6	202	Dave Rayner	K	6–2	210	Michigan State
7	243	Anthony Davis	RB	5–7	200	Wisconsin

== Roster ==
Indianapolis Colts 2005 final roster
Quarterbacks: 18 Peyton Manning; 12 Jim Sorgi; Running backs: 31 Kory Chapman; 32 Edgerrin James; 23 James Mungro FB; 33 Dominic Rhodes; Wide receivers: 88 Marvin Harrison; 85 Aaron Moorehead; 83 Brandon Stokley; 86 Troy Walters; 87 Reggie Wayne; Tight ends: 44 Dallas Clark; 81 Bryan Fletcher; 80 Ben Hartsock; 47 Ben Utecht	Offensive linemen: 71 Ryan Diem OT; 78 Tarik Glenn OT; 57 Dylan Gandy G; 65 Ryan Lilja G; 63 Jeff Saturday C; 73 Jake Scott G/OT; 69 Matt Ulrich G; 60 Kurt Vollers OT; Defensive linemen: 79 Raheem Brock DE; 93 Dwight Freeney DE; 98 Robert Mathis DE; 90 Montae Reagor DT; 95 Darrell Reid DE; 97 Corey Simon DT; 91 Josh Thomas DE; 75 Larry Tripplett DT; 96 Josh Williams DT	Linebackers: 58 Gary Brackett MLB; 51 Gilbert Gardner OLB; 55 Johnathan Goddard OLB; 59 Cato June OLB; 94 Rob Morris MLB; 53 Keith O'Neil OLB; 50 David Thornton OLB; Defensive backs: 42 Jason David CB; 20 Mike Doss SS; 43 Matt Giordano FS; 25 Nick Harper CB; 26 Kelvin Hayden CB; 27 Von Hutchins CB; 28 Marlin Jackson CB; 36 Dexter Reid SS; 21 Bob Sanders FS; 38 Gerome Sapp FS; Special teams: 6 José Cortez K; 17 Hunter Smith P; 48 Justin Snow LS; 13 Mike Vanderjagt K	Reserve lists: 5 Travis Brown QB (IR); 72 Vincent Burns DE (IR); 54 Rocky Calmus OLB (IR); 64 Cody Campbell C/G (IR); 76 Makoa Freitas OT (IR); 74 Joaquin Gonzalez T (IR); 29 Joseph Jefferson CB (IR); 56 Tyjuan Hagler OLB (PUP); -- Kendyll Pope OLB (Susp.); 84 Brad Pyatt WR (IR); -- Stephen Scaldaferri K (IR); 99 Jonathan Welsh DE (IR); 52 Keyon Whiteside LB (PUP); Practice squad: 3 Tom Arth QB; 10 Roscoe Crosby WR; 9 Montiese Culton WR (IR); 37 Eric Hill CB; 62 Mike Johnson C; 67 Bo Lacy OT; 40 Chris Laskowski LB; 34 Brandon Lynch S (IR); 15 Dave Rayner K; 11 John Standeford WR; rookies in italics 53 active, 15 inactive, 8 practice squad

== Schedule ==
=== Preseason ===
Week	Date	Opponent	Result	Record	Venue	Recap
1	August 6	Atlanta Falcons	L 21–27	0–1	(Japan) Tokyo Dome (Tokyo)	Recap
2	August 13	Buffalo Bills	L 10–17	0–2	RCA Dome	Recap
3	August 20	Chicago Bears	L 17–24	0–3	RCA Dome	Recap
4	August 27	at Denver Broncos	L 24–37	0–4	Invesco Field	Recap
5	September 2	at Cincinnati Bengals	L 0–38	0–5	Paul Brown Stadium	Recap

=== Regular season ===
Week	Date	Opponent	Result	Record	Venue	Recap
1	September 11	at Baltimore Ravens	W 24–7	1–0	M&T Bank Stadium	Recap
2	September 18	Jacksonville Jaguars	W 10–3	2–0	RCA Dome	Recap
3	September 25	Cleveland Browns	W 13–6	3–0	RCA Dome	Recap
4	October 2	at Tennessee Titans	W 31–10	4–0	The Coliseum	Recap
5	October 9	at San Francisco 49ers	W 28–3	5–0	Monster Park	Recap
6	October 17	St. Louis Rams	W 45–28	6–0	RCA Dome	Recap
7	October 23	at Houston Texans	W 38–20	7–0	Reliant Stadium	Recap
8	Bye					
9	November 7	at New England Patriots	W 40–21	8–0	Gillette Stadium	Recap
10	November 13	Houston Texans	W 31–17	9–0	RCA Dome	Recap
11	November 20	at Cincinnati Bengals	W 45–37	10–0	Paul Brown Stadium	Recap
12	November 28	Pittsburgh Steelers	W 26–7	11–0	RCA Dome	Recap
13	December 4	Tennessee Titans	W 35–3	12–0	RCA Dome	Recap
14	December 11	at Jacksonville Jaguars	W 26–18	13–0	Alltel Stadium	Recap
15	December 18	San Diego Chargers	L 17–26	13–1	RCA Dome	Recap
16	December 24	at Seattle Seahawks	L 13–28	13–2	Qwest Field	Recap
17	January 1	Arizona Cardinals	W 17–13	14–2	RCA Dome	Recap

=== Standings ===
AFC South
	W	L	T	PCT	DIV	CONF	PF	PA	STK
^{(1)} Indianapolis Colts	14	2	0	.875	6–0	11–1	439	247	W1
^{(5)} Jacksonville Jaguars	12	4	0	.750	4–2	9–3	361	269	W3
Tennessee Titans	4	12	0	.250	2–4	3–9	299	421	L3
Houston Texans	2	14	0	.125	0–6	1–11	260	431	L2

== Week-by-week results ==
=== Week 1: at Baltimore Ravens ===
Quarter	1	2	3	4	Total
Colts	0	3	14	7	24
Ravens	0	0	0	7	7

at M&T Bank Stadium, Baltimore

- Game time: 8:30 pm EST/7:30 pm CST
- Game weather: 76 °F (24 °C), Clear
- Game attendance: 70,501
- Referee: Bill Carollo
- TV announcers (ESPN): Mike Patrick, Joe Theismann, Paul Maguire, and Suzy Kolber

In the first Sunday night football game of the 2005 NFL regular season, the Colts came into town to face the Baltimore Ravens. This game was a game of mistakes by Baltimore, and taking advantage of miscues for Indianapolis. Baltimore QB Kyle Boller threw an interception for a touchdown before being injured, and his replacement, Anthony Wright ended up throwing two more interceptions. Baltimore kicker Matt Stover missed three field goals, and gave the Colts more opportunities to score. The Colts also had three takeaways, and the Ravens had none, however, the Colts punted seven times while Baltimore only punted four times. Indianapolis QB Peyton Manning finished the game 21 for 36, with 254 yards passing, and two touchdown passes. Ravens QB Anthony Wright finished the game 19 for 31, with 214 yards passing, one touchdown, and two interceptions. Indianapolis RB Edgerrin James had 88 yards on 23 carries, and Ravens RB Jamal Lewis had 48 yards on 16 carries.

With the impressive win, Indianapolis began the season at 1–0. This ended up as the Colts’ first win in Baltimore since moving to Indianapolis.

==== Scoring summary ====
Q2 – IND – 0:15 – Mike Vanderjagt 20-yard FG (3–0 IND)

Q3 – IND – 8:43 – 28-yard TD pass from Peyton Manning to Marvin Harrison (Vanderjagt kick) (10–0 IND)

Q3 – IND – 5:08 – 26-yard TD pass from Peyton Manning to Ben Utecht (Vanderjagt kick) (17–0 IND)

Q4 – IND – 2:39 – 30-yard interception return for TD by Cato June (Vanderjagt kick) (24–0 IND)

Q4 – BAL – 0:13 – 17-yard TD pass from Anthony Wright to Daniel Wilcox (Stover kick) (24–7 IND)

=== Week 2: vs. Jacksonville Jaguars ===
Quarter	1	2	3	4	Total
Jaguars	0	0	3	0	3
Colts	0	0	0	10	10

at RCA Dome, Indianapolis

- Game time: 12:00 pm EST/11:00 pm CST
- Game weather: Game played indoors (domed stadium)
- Game attendance: 56,460
- Referee: Scott Green
- TV announcers (CBS): Gus Johnson, Brent Jones

During last week's game at Baltimore, the Colts' defense was the talk of the week, not their offense. This week was similar as the Colts surrendered only 3 points to the Jaguars. This game between AFC South division rivals was dominated by the running game for both teams, and the defensive lines. Colts QB Peyton Manning was 13 of 28 for 122 yards passing, with no touchdowns and an interception while Jacksonville QB Byron Leftwich finished the game 16 of 29 for 198 yards passing. Edgerrin James finished his day off with 27 carries for 128 yards rushing, and Jacksonville RB Fred Taylor finished with 16 carries for 81 yards. Jacksonville had seven fumbles in this game, but recovered every one of them. This game was scoreless until there was less than seven minutes to go in the third quarter.

With the win, the Colts improved to 2–0.

==== Scoring summary ====
Q3 – JAC – 6:59 – Josh Scobee 28-yard FG (3–0 JAC)

Q4 – IND – 8:27 – Ran Carthon 6-yard TD run (Vanderjagt kick) (7–3 IND)

Q4 – IND – 1:50 – Mike Vanderjagt 41-yard FG (10–3 IND)

=== Week 3: vs. Cleveland Browns ===
Quarter	1	2	3	4	Total
Browns	0	3	0	3	6
Colts	7	3	3	0	13

at RCA Dome, Indianapolis

- Game time: 12:00 pm EST/11:00 pm CST
- Game weather: Game played indoors (domed stadium)
- Game attendance: 57,127
- Referee: Jeff Triplette
- TV announcers (CBS): Don Criqui, Steve Tasker

Colts RB Edgerrin James topped the 100-yard mark for the second straight game, and he also scored his first rushing touchdown of the year in this game. His 2-yard touchdown run was the only touchdown scored, and the kickers for both teams both kicked in two field goals each. The Browns defended the deep pass and the potent Colts offense all game, and the Colts just ran the ball. Both of the quarterbacks combined for only 11 incomplete passes. Colts QB Peyton Manning finished the game 19 for 23 with 228 yards passing and one interception as Browns QB Trent Dilfer finished 22 of 29 for 208 passing yards.

In this game, QB Peyton Manning was the second-fastest quarterback to reach 30,000 career passing yards. He did it in 115 games, while Miami Dolphins QB Dan Marino did it in 114 games. This win against the Browns was the Colts' seventh-consecutive win in the RCA Dome.

With the win, the Colts improved to 3–0.

==== Scoring summary ====
Q1 – IND – 4:11 – Edgerrin James 2-yard TD run (Vanderjagt kick) (7–0 IND)

Q2 – CLE – 13:13 – Phil Dawson 40-yard FG (7–3 IND)

Q2 – IND – 3:14 – Mike Vanderjagt 20-yard FG (10–3 IND)

Q3 – IND – 7:07 – Mike Vanderjagt 23-yard FG (13–3 IND)

Q4 – CLE – 14:09 – Phil Dawson 22-yard FG (13–6 IND)

=== Week 4: at Tennessee Titans ===
Quarter	1	2	3	4	Total
Colts	7	10	7	7	31
Titans	3	0	0	7	10

at LP Field, Nashville, Tennessee

- Game time: 12:00 pm EST/11:00 pm CST
- Game weather: 82 °F (28 °C), Sunny and Clear
- Game attendance: 69,149
- Referee: Walt Anderson
- TV announcers (CBS): Kevin Harlan, Randy Cross

The Indianapolis offense finally showed up this game, as QB Peyton Manning threw for 264 yards and four touchdown passes. Two of those touchdown passes were to WR Marvin Harrison and those two touchdowns tied the record for the most touchdowns between a quarterback and a receiver. RB Edgerrin James had 21 carries for 90 yards, and Marvin Harrison had 9 catches for 109 yards.

The Colts have only allowed 26 points to be scored against them in four games so far, which is a franchise record. The Titans never really got anything going on offense, and Tennessee quarterback Steve McNair was their leading rusher for the team in this game.

With the win, the Colts improved to 4–0.

==== Scoring summary ====
Q1 – IND – 11:31 – 25-yard TD pass from Peyton Manning to Reggie Wayne (Vanderjagt kick) (7–0 IND)

Q1 – TEN – 4:58 – Rob Bironas 34-yard FG (7–3 IND)

Q2 – IND – 7:17 – Mike Vanderjagt 20-yard FG (10–3 IND)

Q2 – IND – 1:17 – 11-yard pass from Peyton Manning to Marvin Harrison (Vanderjagt kick) (17–3 IND)

Q3 – IND – 7:55 – 8-yard pass from Peyton Manning to Edgerrin James (Vanderjagt kick) (24–3 IND)

Q4 – IND – 13:09 – 24-yard TD pass from Peyton Manning to Marvin Harrison (Vanderjagt kick) (31–3 IND)

Q4 – TEN – 4:31 – 6-yard TD pass from Steve McNair to Bo Scaife (Bironas kick) (31–10 IND)

=== Week 5: at San Francisco 49ers ===
Quarter	1	2	3	4	Total
Colts	7	7	0	14	28
49ers	0	0	3	0	3

at Monster Park, San Francisco

- Game time: 3:05 pm EST/2:00 pm CST
- Game weather: 64 °F (18 °C), Sunny and Clear
- Game attendance: 68,084
- Referee: Larry Nemmers
- TV announcers (CBS): Dick Enberg, Dan Dierdorf, and Armen Keteyian

San Francisco 49ers QB Alex Smith had his troubles all game as he finished 9 for 23 with 74 passing yards, five turnovers (four of them were interceptions), and five sacks. Colts QB Peyton Manning completed 23 of his 31 passes, threw for one touchdown, and two interceptions. Colts MLB Cato June picked off Alex Smith twice, returning one of them for a touchdown. Colts RB Edgerrin James finished the day with 21 carries for 105 yards and a touchdown, and 49ers RB Kevan Barlow ran for 99 yards off of 18 carries.

Also of note, after Cato June's interception return, kicker Mike Vanderjagt scored his 900th point in the NFL. Also, after Manning got his first career win over the 49ers in this game, that left only four teams that he has not beaten yet.

With the impressive win, the Colts improved to 5–0.

==== Scoring summary ====
Q1 – IND – 7:41 – Dominic Rhodes 6-yard TD run (Vanderjagt kick) (7–0 IND)

Q2 – IND – 6:29 – 24-yard interception return for TD by Cato June (Vanderjagt kick) (14–0 IND)

Q3 – SF – 9:41 – Joe Nedney 30-yard FG (14–3 IND)

Q4 – IND – 14:55 – Edgerrin James 4-yard TD run (Vanderjagt kick) (21–3 IND)

Q4 – IND – 5:58 – 18-yard TD pass from Peyton Manning to Troy Walters (Vanderjagt kick) (28–3 IND)

=== Week 6: vs. St. Louis Rams ===
Quarter	1	2	3	4	Total
Rams	17	3	0	8	28
Colts	0	14	10	21	45

at RCA Dome, Indianapolis

- Game time: 9:00 pm EST/8:00 pm CST
- Game weather: Game played indoors (Domed stadium)
- Game attendance: 57,307
- Referee: Gerry Austin
- TV announcers (ABC): Al Michaels, John Madden, and Sam Ryan

The St. Louis Rams came into a Week 6 matchup with the Colts on Monday Night Football with QB Peyton Manning and WR Marvin Harrison tied with Steve Young and Jerry Rice on the list of the most touchdowns between a quarterback and receiver. That eventually changed in the fourth quarter, as Manning and Harrison made NFL history, again.

The Rams jumped out to a 17–0 lead on the Colts in the RCA Dome in front of a Monday Night Football audience, and few could believe it. The 5–0 Colts were down 17 points at the end of the first quarter, and the 2–3 Rams had all the confidence in the world. That drastically changed in the second half, however. After two interceptions by MLB Cato June that set up two touchdowns, an interception and a fumble recovery by CB Nick Harper that also set up two touchdown scores, the Colts scored all 45 of their points in three quarters and held the Rams to just 11 points in those quarters.

Peyton Manning and Marvin Harrison also made history that night by completing their 86th career touchdown pass to pass Steve Young and Jerry Rice on the list of most touchdowns between a quarterback and receiver. Cato June also left the game as the NFL leader in interceptions. He had three interceptions in the past two games (one for a touchdown). Also of note, Rams QB Marc Bulger went out of the game with a shoulder injury, and backup QB Jamie Martin replaced him for the rest of the game.

With the comeback win, the Colts improved to 6–0.

==== Scoring summary ====
Q1 – STL – 12:04 – Steven Jackson 21-yard TD run (Jeff Wilkins kick) (7–0 STL)

Q1 – STL – 8:17 – Jeff Wilkins 29-yard FG (10–0 STL)

Q1 – STL – 3:31 – 57-yard TD pass from Marc Bulger to Kevin Curtis (Wilkins kick) (17–0 STL)

Q2 – IND – 9:44 – Edgerrin James 1-yard TD run (Mike Vanderjagt kick) (17–7 STL)

Q2 – IND – 1:57 – 3-yard TD pass from Peyton Manning to Reggie Wayne (Vanderjagt kick) (17–14 STL)

Q2 – STL – 0:30 – Jeff Wilkins 49-yard FG (20–14 STL)

Q3 – IND – 10:02 – Mike Vanderjagt 22-yard FG (20–17 STL)

Q3 – IND – 3:16 – Edgerrin James 8-yard TD run (Vanderjagt kick) (24–20 IND)

Q4 – IND – 14:58 – Dominic Rhodes 1-yard TD run (Vanderjagt kick) (31–20 IND)

Q4 – IND – 9:25 – 6-yard TD pass from Peyton Manning to Marvin Harrison (Vanderjagt kick) (38–20 IND)

Q4 – IND – 8:12 – Edgerrin James 1-yard TD run (Vanderjagt kick) (45–20 IND)

Q4 – STL – 3:28 – 9-yard TD pass from Jamie Martin to Cam Cleeland (Marshall Faulk 2-point conversion) (45–28 IND)

=== Week 7: at Houston Texans ===
Quarter	1	2	3	4	Total
Colts	7	7	10	14	38
Texans	0	14	0	6	20

at Reliant Stadium, Houston

- Game time: 1:00 pm EST/12:00 pm CST
- Game weather: Game played indoors
- Game attendance: 70,621
- Referee: Bill Carollo
- TV announcers (CBS): Don Criqui, Steve Beuerlein

The Texans had a fast start, as they forced two first-half turnovers and had the game tied at 14 at halftime. However, that did not hold up in the second half as the Colts scored 24 second-half points and held Houston to −4 total yards on offense. There was even a drive when Texans QB David Carr was sacked on three straight plays, and on those last two sacks, he fumbled the ball. But, Houston recovered both fumbles, and punted the ball after those three horrible plays. Colts QB Peyton Manning was 21 for 27 with 237 passing yards, two touchdowns, and an interception, and David Carr was 6 of 9 with 48 passing yards, one touchdown, and an interception.

With the win, the Colts improved to 7–0. Also of note, this win gave coach Tony Dungy his 100th career win in the NFL. He is the 34th head coach to win 100 games.

==== Scoring summary ====
Q1 – IND – 3:42 – Edgerrin James 1-yard TD run (Mike Vanderjagt kick) (7–0 IND)

Q2 – IND – 11:22 – 31-yard TD pass from Peyton Manning to Dallas Clark (Vanderjagt kick) (14–0 IND)

Q2 – HOU – 3:15 – Domanick Davis 8-yard TD run (Kris Brown kick) (14–7 IND)

Q2 – HOU – 0:30 – 8-yard TD pass from David Carr to Jabar Gaffney (Brown kick) (14–14)

Q3 – IND – 11:18 – Edgerrin James 9-yard TD run (Vanderjagt kick) (21–14 IND)

Q3 – IND – 0:17 – Mike Vanderjagt 36-yard FG (24–14 IND)

Q4 – IND – 11:38 – 7-yard TD pass from Peyton Manning to Marvin Harrison (Vanderjagt kick) (31–14 IND)

Q4 – IND – 8:07 – Montae Reagor 37-yard fumble return TD (38–14 IND)

Q4 – HOU – 7:56 – Jerome Mathis 89-yard kick return TD (2-point conversion failed) (38–20 IND)

=== Week 9: at New England Patriots ===
Quarter	1	2	3	4	Total
Colts	7	14	10	9	40
Patriots	7	0	7	7	21

at Gillette Stadium, Foxborough, Massachusetts

- Game time: 9:00 pm EST/8:00 pm CST
- Game weather: 51 °F (11 °C), Clear and Cool
- Game attendance: 68,756
- Referee: Bernie Kukar
- TV announcers (ABC): Al Michaels, John Madden, and Sam Ryan

"They showed why they're pretty much the best team in the league."
~Rosevelt Colvin

Coming into this game, Colts quarterback Peyton Manning was 0–7 against the Patriots in Foxboro. Manning finished the game 28 for 37 with 321 yards and three touchdowns. He helped guide the Colts to score on seven of their eight possessions.

The Colts forced the Patriots to do some uncharacteristic things just to catch up. Pats coach Bill Belichick called for an onside kick, and to go for a first down on fourth down and 4. The Colts held onto the ball for over 36 minutes of the game, and controlled the tempo all the way to the end. Throughout the game you could see the frustration on the Patriots as Tom Brady was seen yelling "Are we gonna fight? Are we gonna lay down?" at his teammates throughout the game

Patriots QB Tom Brady finished the game 22 of 33 for 265 yards and three touchdowns, running back Corey Dillon ran the ball for 40 yards on 12 carries, and Edgerrin James ran the ball for 104 yards on 34 carries. The Colts had two receivers top 100 yards receiving, Marvin Harrison and Reggie Wayne, and both of them had nine receptions each. On the very last play of the game, Colts DE Robert Mathis recorded a sack to keep his streak alive at eight straight games with at least one sack. With the win, the Colts improved to 8–0 and were the only undefeated team in the league.

==== Scoring summary ====
Q1 – IND – 12:30 – 1-yard TD pass from Peyton Manning to Marvin Harrison (Mike Vanderjagt kick) (7–0 IND)

Q1 – NE – 5:52 – 16-yard TD pass from Tom Brady to Deion Branch (Adam Vinatieri kick) (7–7)

Q2 – IND – 11:50 – Edgerrin James 2-yard TD run (Vanderjagt kick) (14–7 IND)

Q2 – IND – 0:09 – 10-yard TD pass from Peyton Manning to Reggie Wayne (Vanderjagt kick) (21–7 IND)

Q3 – IND – 8:36 – Dominic Rhodes 4-yard TD run (Vanderjagt kick) (28–7 IND)

Q3 – NE – 5:46 – 31-yard TD pass from Tom Brady to Daniel Graham (Vinatieri kick) (28–14 IND)

Q3 – IND – 8:30 – Mike Vanderjagt 35-yard FG (31–14 IND)

Q4 – IND – 13:58 – Mike Vanderjagt 20-yard FG (34–14 IND)

Q4 – NE – 10:15 – 19-yard TD pass from Tom Brady to Troy Brown (Vinatieri kick) (34–21 IND)

Q4 – IND – 5:53 – 30-yard TD pass from Peyton Manning to Marvin Harrison (2-point conversion failed) (40–21 IND)

=== Week 10: vs. Houston Texans ===
Quarter	1	2	3	4	Total
Texans	0	7	10	0	17
Colts	7	14	7	3	31

at RCA Dome, Indianapolis

- Game time: 1:00 pm EST/12:00 pm CST
- Game weather: Game played indoors (domed stadium)
- Game attendance: 57,209
- Referee: Pete Morelli
- TV announcers (CBS): Gus Johnson, Steve Tasker

Colts QB Peyton Manning finished his game off 26 of 35 with 297 passing yards, three touchdowns, and was sacked once, while Texans QB David Carr went 16 for 25 with 138 passing yards, one touchdown, and was sacked three times. RB Edgerrin James carried the football 26 times for 122 yards. The Houston Texans offense could only muster up two first downs the entire game, and one was by penalty in the second quarter. Colts DE Robert Mathis failed to record a sack in this game, the first time all season that he has not had at least one sack in a game.

Through week 10, the Colts were still the only undefeated team in the league improving to 9–0.

==== Scoring summary ====
Q1 – IND – 4:29 – 14-yard TD pass from Peyton Manning to Dallas Clark (Mike Vanderjagt kick) (7–0 IND)

Q2 – IND – 11:14 – Edgerrin James 5-yard TD run (Vanderjagt kick) (14–0 IND)

Q2 – IND – 5:36 – 21-yard TD pass from Peyton Manning to Brandon Stokley (Vanderjagt kick) (21–0 IND)

Q2 – HOU – 1:53 – Jonathan Wells 14-yard TD run (Kris Brown kick) (21–7 IND)

Q3 – HOU – 8:26 – 13-yard TD pass from David Carr to Jabar Gaffney (Brown kick) (21–14 IND)

Q3 – IND – 5:54 – 30-yard TD pass from Peyton Manning to Marvin Harrison (Vanderjagt kick) (28–14 IND)

Q3 – HOU – 0:59 – Kris Brown 24-yard FG (28–17 IND)

Q4 – IND – 11:30 – Mike Vanderjagt 45-yard FG (31–17 IND)

=== Week 11: at Cincinnati Bengals ===
Quarter	1	2	3	4	Total
Colts	14	21	7	3	45
Bengals	10	17	7	3	37

at Paul Brown Stadium, Cincinnati

- Game time: 4:15 pm EST/3:15 pm CST
- Game weather: 55 °F (13 °C), Partly Cloudy
- Game attendance: 65,995
- Referee: Tom White
- TV announcers (CBS): Jim Nantz, Phil Simms, and Bonnie Bernstein

Prior to this game, Bengals wide receiver Chad Johnson made his weekly guarantee that the opposing cornerback could not stop him. The Colts cornerbacks could not stop Johnson, as he had 8 receptions for 189 yards and one touchdown. But, the Bengals still lost to the Colts in a shootout, and the Colts remained the only undefeated team in the NFL, at 10–0. Colts QB Peyton Manning finished the game 24 for 40 with 365 passing yards, 3 touchdowns, and one interception. The opposing quarterback, Carson Palmer also had marvelous stats, as he finished with 25 pass completions on 38 attempts, two touchdowns, and one interception. As Chad Johnson led the Bengals in receiving, TE Dallas Clark led the Colts in receiving with six catches for 125 yards. There were only a total of three punts in the entire game, two by the Colts and one by the Bengals. In the first six possessions of the game, there were five touchdowns and a field goal. During those six possessions, both Manning and Palmer had perfect 158.3 quarterback ratings.

The Colts were the seventeenth team to start a season 10–0 and the first to do so since the Denver Broncos during the 1998 NFL season. Colts WR Marvin Harrison also reached 900 receptions for his career in this game, and he is the fastest player to do so in NFL history.

==== Scoring summary ====
Q1 – IND – 8:56 – Dominic Rhodes 4-yard TD run (Mike Vanderjagt kick) (7–0 IND)

Q1 – CIN – 4:47 – Shayne Graham 43-yard FG (7–3 IND)

Q1 – IND – 4:30 – 66-yard TD pass from Peyton Manning to Reggie Wayne (Vanderjagt kick) (14–3 IND)

Q1 – CIN – 3:23 – 68-yard TD pass from Carson Palmer to Chad Johnson (Graham kick) (14–10 IND)

Q2 – IND – 14:12 – 9-yard TD pass from Peyton Manning to Bryan Fletcher (Vanderjagt kick) (21–10 IND)

Q2 – CIN – 9:13 – Rudi Johnson 1-yard TD run (Graham kick) (21–17 IND)

Q2 – IND – 7:11 – Edgerrin James 1-yard TD run (28–17 IND)

Q2 – IND – 3:41 – 21-yard TD pass from Peyton Manning to Dallas Clark (Vanderjagt kick) (35–17 IND)

Q2 – CIN – 1:29 – Shayne Graham 41-yard FG (35–20 IND)

Q2 – CIN – 0:12 – Rudi Johnson 1-yard TD run (Graham kick) (35–27 IND)

Q3 – CIN – 12:52 – 15-yard TD pass from Carson Palmer to Chris Henry (Graham kick) (35–34)

Q3 – IND – 4:29 – Edgerrin James 2-yard TD run (Vanderjagt kick) (42–34 IND)

Q4 – IND – 6:16 – Mike Vanderjagt 19-yard FG (45–34 IND)

Q4 – CIN – 1:23 – Shayne Graham 44-yard FG (45–37 IND)

=== Week 12: vs. Pittsburgh Steelers ===
Quarter	1	2	3	4	Total
Steelers	7	0	0	0	7
Colts	10	6	7	3	26

at RCA Dome, Indianapolis

- Game time: 9:00 pm EST/8:00 pm CST
- Game weather: Game played indoors (domed stadium)
- Game attendance: 57,442
- Referee: Bill Leavy
- TV announcers (ABC): Al Michaels, John Madden, and Sam Ryan

"It’s tough to go undefeated, but they have the potential."
~Hines Ward

'Monday Night Game The Colts defeated another tough AFC opponent in week 12, and were still undefeated. After handing the Steelers another defeat, the Colts solidified their presence as one of the best teams in the NFL. After the Steelers went three-and-out on their first possession of the game, the Colts scored on the first play of their first drive when quarterback Peyton Manning threw an 80-yard touchdown strike to WR Marvin Harrison. Harrison blew by cornerback Ike Taylor, and the Colts never looked back. They controlled the tempo throughout the entire game. Manning finished the game 15 of 25 with 245 passing yards, had two touchdowns, and one interception. On the other hand, Steelers QB Ben Roethlisberger, did not fare as well. He finished 17 of 26 with 133 passing yards, had one touchdown, and two interceptions. The Colts snapped Roethlisberger's nine-game road winning streak. Roethlisberger had never lost a game on the road during his first season in 2004, and had not yet lost on the road in 2005 before coming to Indianapolis. Marvin Harrison led all receivers in the game with four catches for 128 yards and one touchdown.

The Colts were the eleventh team to start a season 11–0, and the first to do so since the Denver Broncos during the 1998 NFL season. Also, after Manning got his first career win over the Steelers in this game, that left only three teams that he had not yet beaten. This would be the Colt's last home win over the Steelers until 2023.

==== Scoring summary ====
Q1 – IND – 13:16 – 80-yard TD pass from Peyton Manning to Marvin Harrison (Mike Vanderjagt kick) (7–0 IND)

Q1 – IND – 6:07 – Mike Vanderjagt 29-yard FG (10–0 IND)

Q1 – PIT – 1:14 – 12-yard TD pass from Ben Roethlisberger to Hines Ward (Jeff Reed kick) (10–7 IND)

Q2 – IND – 5:22 – Mike Vanderjagt 48-yard FG (13–7 IND)

Q2 – IND – 0:00 – Mike Vanderjagt 44-yard FG (16–7 IND)

Q3 – IND – 11:47 – 12-yard TD pass from Peyton Manning to Bryan Fletcher (Vanderjagt kick) (23–7 IND)

Q4 – IND – 1:38 – Mike Vanderjagt 28-yard FG (26–7 IND)

=== Week 13: vs. Tennessee Titans ===
Quarter	1	2	3	4	Total
Titans	0	3	0	0	3
Colts	7	7	14	7	35

at RCA Dome, Indianapolis, Indiana

- Game time: 1:00 pm EST/12:00 pm CST
- Game weather: Game played indoors (domed stadium)
- Game attendance: 57,228
- Referee: Tony Corrente
- TV announcers (CBS): Gus Johnson, Steve Tasker

The Colts continued their undefeated streak this week as they mightily defeated the Tennessee Titans 35–3. So far, the Colts had won seven of their last nine games by at least 17 points, and averaged more than 35 points per game. Colts quarterback Peyton Manning completed 13 of 17 passes for 187 passing yards and three touchdowns, giving him a 151.2 QB rating. Titans QB Steve McNair was 22 of 33 with 220 yards passing and had one fumble.

The Colts were the fifth team in NFL history to start a season 12–0, and also clinched a playoff spot with this win against the Titans. But the Colts had to wait one more week to clinch the AFC South Championship and a first-round bye in the playoffs. Peyton Manning also made history in this game, becoming the first quarterback in NFL history to throw 25 touchdown passes in eight straight seasons. Also, on the Colts' opening drive, WR Marvin Harrison became the 12th receiver in league history to top 12,000 yards receiving in his career.

==== Scoring summary ====
Q1 – IND – 8:08 – 10-yard TD pass from Peyton Manning to Marvin Harrison (Mike Vanderjagt kick) (7–0 IND)

Q2 – IND – 4:11 – 13-yard TD pass from Peyton Manning to Bryan Fletcher (Vanderjagt kick) (14–0 IND)

Q2 – TEN – 0:29 – Rob Bironas 24-yard FG (14–3 IND)

Q3 – IND – 9:40 – 27-yard TD pass from Peyton Manning to Reggie Wayne (Vanderjagt kick) (21–3 IND)

Q3 – IND – 1:28 – Edgerrin James 2-yard TD run (Vanderjagt kick) (28–3 IND)

Q4 – IND – 11:44 – Larry Tripplett 60-yard fumble return TD (35–3 IND)

=== Week 14: at Jacksonville Jaguars ===
Quarter	1	2	3	4	Total
Colts	7	10	6	3	26
Jaguars	0	3	0	15	18

at Alltel Stadium, Jacksonville, Florida

- Game time: 1:00 pm EST/12:00 pm CST
- Game weather: 55 °F (13 °C), Cloudy
- Game attendance: 67,164
- Referee: Jeff Triplette
- TV announcers (CBS): Dick Enberg, Dan Dierdorf, and Armen Keteyian

The Indianapolis Colts were now one step closer to perfection, as they only had only four games left to match the record set by the 1972 Miami Dolphins for most consecutive wins to begin a season. Colts quarterback Peyton Manning picked apart the Jacksonville secondary all game, finishing the game with 24 of 36 for 324 yards passing and two touchdowns, while being sacked a season-high 3 times. Jaguars QB David Garrard (who was starting in the place of Byron Leftwich) was 26 of 35 for 250 passing yards, and had one touchdown. Also of note: the Colts snapped the Jaguars' five-game winning streak.

After the Colts defeated the Jaguars, they became only the fourth team in NFL history to start a season 13–0, after the 1934 Chicago Bears, the 1972 Miami Dolphins, and the 1998 Denver Broncos. Also, with this win, the Colts clinched the AFC South Division Championship, a first-round bye in the NFL playoffs, and home-field advantage throughout the playoffs.

==== Scoring summary ====
Q1 – IND – 4:40 – 9-yard TD pass from Peyton Manning to Marvin Harrison (Mike Vanderjagt kick) (7–0 IND)

Q2 – JAC – 14:11 – Josh Scobee 27-yard FG (7–3 IND)

Q2 – IND – 9:21 – 65-yard TD pass from Peyton Manning to Marvin Harrison (Vanderjagt kick) (14–3 IND)

Q2 – IND – 0:00 – Mike Vanderjagt 40-yard FG (17–3 IND)

Q3 – IND – 8:14 – Mike Vanderjagt 34-yard FG (20–3 IND)

Q3 – IND – 0:45 – Mike Vanderjagt 38-yard FG (23–3 IND)

Q4 – IND – 12:13 – Mike Vanderjagt 46-yard FG (26–3 IND)

Q4 – JAC – 4:08 – David Garrard 5-yard TD run (Scobee kick) (26–10 IND)

Q4 – JAC – 1:54 – 1-yard TD pass from David Garrard to Jimmy Smith (David Garrard 2-point conversion) (26–18 IND)

=== Week 15: vs. San Diego Chargers ===
Quarter	1	2	3	4	Total
Chargers	10	3	3	10	26
Colts	0	0	17	0	17

at RCA Dome, Indianapolis

- Game time: 1:00 pm EST/12:00 pm CST
- Game weather: Game played indoors (domed stadium)
- Game attendance: 57,389
- Referee: Terry McAulay
- TV announcers (CBS): Dick Enberg, Dan Dierdorf, and Armen Keteyian

The Colts came into Week 15 of the NFL season still undefeated, and faced the San Diego Chargers at home. San Diego started the game with 4 scores in the first 3 quarters of the game, before the Colts could even score. By the time the Colts finally put some points on the scoreboard, they were down 16–0 to the Chargers. Marty Schottenheimer and the Chargers were in the middle of a playoff hunt, and they were not going to go down easy. But after San Diego jumped out to a 16-point lead, the Colts came back in the third quarter with three scores of their own, to put them up by one point at the beginning of the fourth quarter, 17–16. However, they were not able to score the rest of the game, and the Chargers scored twice in the fourth quarter, once on a field goal and another on an 83-yard touchdown run by RB Michael Turner. The loss to the Chargers was the first loss of the season for the Colts, but the last team to go 13–0, the 1998 Denver Broncos, lost their 14th and 15th games, before winning their last regular season game, and they went on to win Super Bowl XXXIII.

With the loss, the Colts fell to 13–1.

==== Scoring summary ====
Q1 – SD – 9:13 – 29-yard TD pass from Drew Brees to Keenan McCardell (Nate Kaeding kick) (7–0 SD)

Q1 – SD – 1:56 – Nate Kaeding 36-yard FG (10–0 SD)

Q2 – SD – 0:15 – Nate Kaeding 20-yard FG (13–0 SD)

Q3 – SD – 9:30 – Nate Kaeding 48-yard FG (16–0 SD)

Q3 – IND – 6:41 – Mike Vanderjagt 32-yard FG (16–3 SD)

Q3 – IND – 3:42 – Edgerrin James 1-yard TD run (Vanderjagt kick) (16–10 SD)

Q3 – IND – 11:44 – 1-yard TD pass from Peyton Manning to Dallas Clark (Vanderjagt kick) (17–16 IND)

Q4 – SD – 6:41 – Nate Kaeding 49-yard FG (19–17 SD)

Q4 – SD – 2:09 – Michael Turner 83-yard TD run (Kaeding kick) (26–17 SD)

=== Week 16: at Seattle Seahawks ===
Quarter	1	2	3	4	Total
Colts	3	3	0	7	13
Seahawks	7	7	7	7	28

at Qwest Field, Seattle

- Game time: 4:15 pm EST/3:15 pm CST
- Game weather: 57 °F (14 °C), Overcast
- Game attendance: 67,855
- Referee: Bill Vinovich
- TV announcers (CBS): Jim Nantz, Phil Simms, and Bonnie Bernstein

After the Colts' loss to the San Diego Chargers last week, Colts coach Tony Dungy elected to keep most of his starters benched for the entire Christmas Eve game against the Seattle Seahawks, excepting the first drive of the game. However, Dungy's decision did not come from the sidelines, because two days earlier, his eldest son, James, had committed suicide in his apartment. So, assistant coach Jim Caldwell took over for Tony as he spent the week with his family.

Colts QB Peyton Manning played only a couple series and backup QB Jim Sorgi got some extended playing time. Dungy decided that since they had clinched a playoff spot, the AFC South Division Championship, home-field advantage throughout the playoffs, and the No. 1 seed in the playoffs, he had nothing else to really play for, and he did not want to risk his players getting injured before the playoffs. Seattle was playing to win because if they beat the Colts, they would clinch the No. 1 seed in the playoffs in the NFC.

The Seahawks beat the Colts 28–13, and NFL MVP Shaun Alexander scored three touchdowns in the game and tied Priest Holmes for the NFL record for touchdowns in a season with 27. The Colts-Seahawks game set records well before kickoff. The game featured the highest scoring and winningest teams against each other, and each looking to set a franchise record for most wins in a season. In addition, the schedule makers set a record with the first regular season game where the teams combined for at least 25 victories. With the loss, the Colts fell to 13–2.

==== Scoring summary ====
Q1 – IND – 7:51 – Mike Vanderjagt 24-yard FG (3–0 IND)

Q1 – SEA – 5:42 – Shaun Alexander 2-yard TD run (Josh Brown kick) (7–3 SEA)

Q2 – SEA – 11:46 – 15-yard TD pass from Matt Hasselbeck to Jerramy Stevens (Brown kick) (14–3 SEA)

Q2 – IND – 0:37 – Mike Vanderjagt 32-yard FG (14–6 SEA)

Q3 – SEA – 10:57 – 6-yard TD pass from Matt Hasselbeck to Shaun Alexander (Brown kick) (21–6 SEA)

Q4 – SEA – 3:58 – Shaun Alexander 1-yard TD run (Brown kick) (28–6 SEA)

Q4 – IND – 1:59 – 6-yard TD pass from Jim Sorgi to Troy Walters (Vanderjagt kick) (28–13 SEA)

=== Week 17: vs. Arizona Cardinals ===
Quarter	1	2	3	4	Total
Cardinals	0	3	7	3	13
Colts	7	3	7	0	17

at RCA Dome, Indianapolis

- Game time: 1:00 pm EST/12:00 pm CST
- Game weather: Game played indoors (domed stadium)
- Game attendance: 57,211
- Referee: Ron Winter
- TV announcers (FOX): Matt Vasgersian, Neil O'Donnell

In the last game of the regular season, Colts’ coach Tony Dungy made his return to the sidelines after the death of his eldest son. The Colts faced the Arizona Cardinals at the RCA Dome, and in front of an emotional and proud crowd. The Colts won this game, 17–13 over the Cardinals, and they dedicated the last two games of the regular season to James Dungy. Colts QB Peyton Manning only played on the first drive of this game, just like the previous game, and Jim Sorgi played at the quarterback position for the rest of the game.

With the win, the Colts finished their regular season at 14–2.

==== Scoring summary ====
Q1 – IND – 4:44 – 14-yard TD pass from Jim Sorgi to Ben Utecht (Mike Vanderjagt kick) (7–0 IND)

Q2 – ARI – 13:04 – Neil Rackers 28-yard FG (7–3 IND)

Q2 – IND – 2:41 – Mike Vanderjagt 44-yard FG (10–3 IND)

Q3 – IND – 11:26 – 18-yard TD pass from Jim Sorgi to Troy Walters (Vanderjagt kick) (17–3 IND)

Q3 – ARI – 8:29 – 25-yard TD pass from Josh McCown to Larry Fitzgerald (Rackers kick) (17–10 IND)

Q4 – ARI – 10:59 – Neil Rackers 42-yard FG (17–13 IND)

== Tony Dungy and family experience tragedy ==
On December 22, 2005, Colts coach Tony Dungy was notified that his eldest son, James Dungy, was found unresponsive in his apartment in Lutz, Florida by James' girlfriend. A deputy from the Hillsborough County Sheriff's Department performed CPR on the 18-year-old Dungy before an ambulance transported him to University Community Hospital, where James was pronounced dead. The Operations Manager at the Hillsborough County Medical Examiners Department said that the cause of death was an apparent suicide. On February 17, 2006, after the autopsy was performed, Dr. Jacqueline Lee of the Hillsborough County Medical Examiner's Office stated that Dungy had hanged himself from a bedroom ceiling fan with a leather belt.

Colts coach Tony Dungy did not perform his usual head coaching duties in the next regular season game for the Colts, as he had taken a brief vacation to mourn the loss of his son. Assistant head coach / quarterbacks coach Jim Caldwell took over for Dungy in a Week 16 showdown with the Seattle Seahawks, in which the Colts lost, 13–28. Dungy did return to the next game, which happened to be the last game of the regular season. The Colts won that game, 17–13 over the Arizona Cardinals. The Colts dedicated the last two games of the season to James Dungy, with Tony Dungy returning to the sideline in their Divisional Playoff game against Pittsburgh.

Two months before his death, James Dungy had also been treated for a prescription drug overdose on October 21, 2005.

== Postseason ==
Playoff round	Date	Opponent (seed)	Result	Record	Game site	NFL.com recap
Wild Card	First-round bye					
Divisional	January 15, 2006	Pittsburgh Steelers (6)	L 18–21	0–1	RCA Dome	Recap

=== AFC Divisional Playoffs: vs. (#6) Pittsburgh Steelers ===
AFC Divisional Playoff: (#6) Pittsburgh Steelers (11–5) at (#1) Indianapolis Colts (14–2)

Quarter	1	2	3	4	Total
Steelers	14	0	7	0	21
Colts	0	3	0	15	18

at RCA Dome • Indianapolis, Indiana

- Date: January 15, 2006
- Game time: 1:00 p.m. EDT
- Game weather: Indoors (dome)
- Game attendance: 57,449
- Referee: Pete Morelli
- TV announcers (CBS): Dick Enberg, Dan Dierdorf, and Armen Keteyian
- Game Book

Game information

Steelers

- Ben Roethlisberger
  14/24, 197 Yds, 2 TD, INT
- Willie Parker
  17 Rush, 59 Yds
- Hines Ward
  3 Rec, 68 Yds

Colts

- Peyton Manning
  22/38, 290 Yds, TD
- Edgerrin James
  13 Rush, 56 Yds, TD
- Reggie Wayne
  7 Rec, 97 Yds

The Steelers took a 14–0 lead in the first quarter with quarterback Ben Roethlisberger’s six-yard touchdown pass to wide receiver Antwaan Randle El on the game's opening drive, and tight end Heath Miller’s seven-yard touchdown reception. The Colts could only manage a field goal in the second quarter while running back Jerome Bettis’s one-yard touchdown run late in the third quarter increased the Steelers' lead, 21–3.

The Colts rallied in the final quarter to cut the deficit 21–18, with quarterback Manning's 50-yard touchdown pass to tight end Dallas Clark and running back Edgerrin James’s 3-yard touchdown run (and Reggie Wayne’s successful two-point conversion reception). James' touchdown came a few plays after an interception by Pittsburgh safety Troy Polamalu was overturned by instant replay (a reversal that the league would later admit was a mistake ). But with 1:20 left in the game, Manning was sacked on fourth and 16 at the Colts' 2-yard line, and the ball was turned over to the Steelers on downs.

At this point, the game appeared to be over. However, the Steelers were forced to advance the ball towards another score instead of taking a quarterback kneel because the Colts still had three timeouts remaining. But on Pittsburgh's first play, in which Bettis tried to punch it in for an insurance touchdown, he fumbled for the first time all season when linebacker Gary Brackett popped it from Bettis' hands with his helmet. Indianapolis defensive back Nick Harper recovered the ball and appeared to be on his way for an Indy touchdown that would've given the Colts the lead when Roethlisberger made a season-saving tackle at the Colts' 42-yard line (midfield), spinning around and grabbing his ankle. Eventually, the Colts then advanced to the Pittsburgh 28-yard line, but kicker Mike Vanderjagt, who had been perfect at home in the playoffs, missed a 46-yard game-tying field goal attempt wide right with 17 seconds remaining, and the Steelers ran out the clock.

With the heartbreaking loss, the Colts ended their season at 14–3 and became the first #1 seed to lose to a #6 seed since the 1990 expansion of the playoffs to six teams per conference. The Steelers would go on to win Super Bowl XL.

Scoring summary

Quarter	Time	Drive			Team	Scoring information	Score	
Quarter	Time	Plays	Yards	TOP	Team	Scoring information	PIT	IND
1	9:25	10	84	5:35	Steelers	Antwaan Randle El 6-yard touchdown reception from Ben Roethlisberger, Jeff Reed kick good	7	0
1	3:12	7	72	2:53	Steelers	Heath Miller 7-yard touchdown reception from Ben Roethlisberger, Jeff Reed kick good	14	0
2	1:20	15	96	9:39	Colts	20-yard field goal by Mike Vanderjagt	14	3
3	1:26	6	30	3:21	Steelers	1 Jerome Bettis-yard touchdown run, Jeff Reed kick good	21	3
4	14:09	6	72	2:17	Colts	Dallas Clark 50-yard touchdown reception from Peyton Manning, Mike Vanderjagt kick good	21	10
4	4:24	6	80	1:39	Colts	Edgerrin James 3-yard touchdown run, 2-point pass good	21	18
"TOP" = time of possession. For other American football terms, see Glossary of American football.							21	18

== See also ==
- History of the Indianapolis Colts
- Indianapolis Colts seasons
- Colts–Patriots rivalry
