= 2003 Music City Bowl =

2003 Gaylord Hotels Music City Bowl presented by Bridgestone
- 6th Music City Bowl
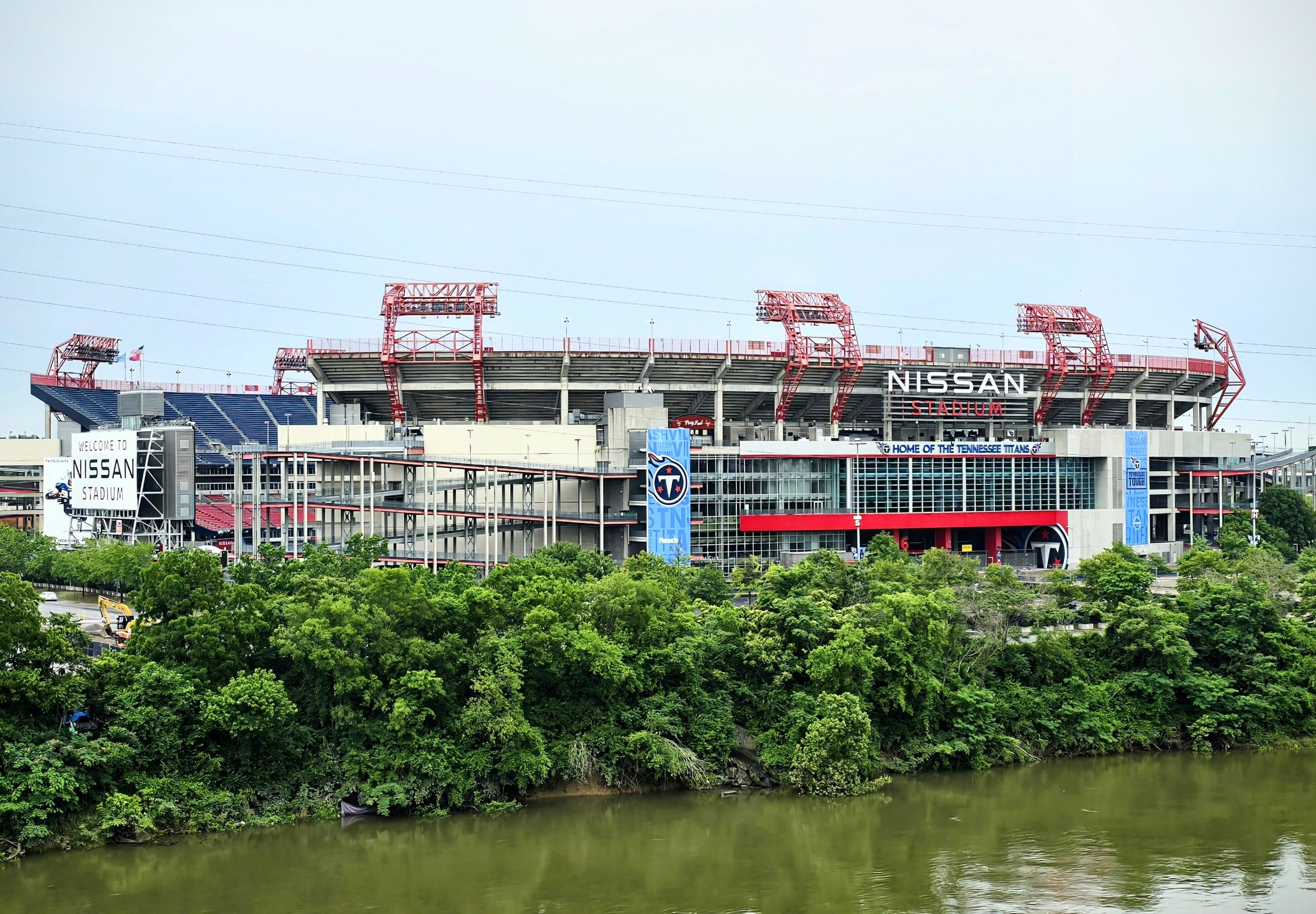
- The Coliseum in Nashville, Tennessee, hosted the Music City Bowl.
Wisconsin Badgers	Auburn Tigers
(7–5)	(7–5)
Big Ten	SEC
14	28
Head coach: Barry Alvarez	Head coach: Tommy Tuberville
	1	2	3	4	Total
Wisconsin	0	6	0	8	14
Auburn	0	7	7	14	28
- Date: December 31, 2003
- Season: 2003
- Stadium: The Coliseum
- Location: Nashville, Tennessee
- MVP: QB Jason Campbell, Auburn
- Referee: Jack Childress (ACC)
- Attendance: 55,109
- Payout: US$912,912 per team

United States TV coverage
- Network: ESPN
- Nielsen ratings: 2.44

The 2003 Music City Bowl was played on December 31, 2003, in Nashville, Tennessee, and featured the Wisconsin Badgers and the Auburn Tigers. It was the sixth edition of the game. Sponsored by Gaylord Hotels and Bridgestone, it was officially named the Gaylord Hotels Music City Bowl presented by Bridgestone.

== Recap of game ==
After a scoreless first quarter, Wisconsin kicked a 20-yard field goal in the second quarter to go up 3–0. Auburn running back Ronnie Brown scored on a 1-yard touchdown run, to give Auburn a 7–3 lead. Wisconsin kicked another field goal before halftime, and ended up trailing only 7–6.

In the third quarter, Carnell Williams scored on a 1-yard touchdown run, to give the Tigers a 14–6 lead over Wisconsin. With 8:14 left in the fourth quarter, quarterback Jim Sorgi fired a 12-yard touchdown pass to Lee Evans. The 2-point conversion attempt to Owen Daniels was successful, and the score was tied at 14. Ronnie Brown scored on a 2-yard touchdown run, and Carnell Williams scored on a 1-yard touchdown run, as Auburn pulled away for a 28–14 win.

Both teams were awarded $912,912 for their participation in the game.
