= AAW =

AAW may refer to:

== Aviation and military ==
- Afriqiyah Airways, an airline based in Tripoli, Libya, by ICAO airline code
- Anti-aircraft warfare
- X-53 Active Aeroelastic Wing

== Other uses ==
- Ad-Aware, software
- All American Wrestling independent professional wrestling company in Berwyn, Illinois
- Against All Will, an American rock band
- American Association of Woodturners
- Arts Academy in the Woods in Fraser, Michigan, US
- Solong language, a language of Papua New Guinea, by ISO 639-3 language code
