= Fraser High School (Michigan) =

Location
- 34270 Garfield Road; Fraser, Michigan 48026; United States
- Coordinates: 42.5503°N 82.9470°W

Information
- Type: Public high school
- School district: Fraser Public Schools
- NCES District ID: 2614820
- NCES School ID: 261482005179
- Principal: Ryan Sines
- Teaching staff: 105.93 (FTE)
- Grades: 9-12
- Enrollment: 1,431 (2024–2025)
- Student to teacher ratio: 13.51
- Colors: Navy & gold
- Mascot: Ramblers
- Website: fhs.fraser.k12.mi.us

Fraser High School is a high school located in Fraser, Michigan within the metro Detroit region. It is the only high school in the Fraser Public Schools district. The school serves grades 9 through 12.

== Athletics ==
Fraser is a member of the Michigan High School Athletic Association and competes in the Macomb Area Conference.

The school has appeared in five MHSAA Finals for girls volleyball, most recently in 2006. The Ramblers had three consecutive appearances in the 2002, 2003, and 2004 seasons, winning back-to-back Class A Championships in the latter years.

Currently, Fraser sponsors eleven girls' and eleven boys' varsity sports and is Title IX compliant.

== Recognition ==
In April 2022, teacher Stacie Yokhana received a Milken Educator Award. She is the first recipient from Fraser Public Schools since 1990.

Also in 2022, a Fraser student/teacher team was nominated to participate in a National History Day competition Sacrifice for Freedom®: World War II in the Pacific Student & Teacher Institute; a six-month long research project culminating in a presentation given at the Pearl Harbor National Memorial in June of that same year.
