= Fraser Public Schools =

Public school district in Michigan

Address
- 33466 Garfield Road Fraser, Macomb County, Michigan, 48026; United States

District information
- Motto: Where learning drives innovation.
- Grades: PreKindergarten–12
- President: Scott Wallace
- Superintendent: Dr. Carrie Wozniak
- Schools: 8
- Budget: $77,724,000 2022–2023 expenditures
- NCES District ID: 2614820

Students and staff
- Students: 4,409 (2024–2025)
- Teachers: 285.04 (on an FTE basis) (2024–2025)
- Staff: 578.31 FTE (2024–2025)
- Student–teacher ratio: 15.47 (2024–2025)

Other information
- Website: www.fraser.k12.mi.us

Fraser Public Schools is a public school district in Macomb County, Michigan, in Metro Detroit. It serves Fraser and parts of Clinton Township and Roseville.

== History ==
The first Fraser High School was built in 1926 at Caroline and Masonic Streets, and its first class graduated in 1930. In 1957, the high school moved to the building that became Richards Middle School, and the previous high school became Kennedy Junior High School. The high school moved to its current site in 1970.

Kennedy Junior High closed at the end of the 1982-1983 school year and its building was leased to Macomb Community College. Currently it is used by the charter school Arts Academy in the Woods.

In 1998, voters passed a construction bond issue that funded the demolition and rebuilding of much of Richards Middle School. Between 2005 and 2023, voters passed about $167 million in bond issues, reinvesting in the district's existing facilities.

== Schools ==
Schools in Fraser Public Schools district
School	Address	Notes
Fraser High School	34270 Garfield Road, Fraser	Grades 9-12. Built 1970.
Richards Middle School	33500 Garfield Road, Fraser	Grades 7-8. Built 1957.
Walt Disney Elementary	36155 Kelly Road, Clinton Township	Grades K-6. Built 1958.
Thomas Edison Elementary	17470 Sewell Avenue, Fraser	Grades K-6. Built 1960.
Eisenhower Elementary	31275 Eveningside, Fraser	Grades K-6. Built 1957.
Ralph Waldo Emerson Elementary	32151 Danna, Fraser	Grades K-6. Built 1965.
Salk Elementary	17601 Fifteen Mile Road, Clinton Township	Grades K-6. Built 1960.
Mark Twain Elementary	30601 Calahan, Roseville	Grades K-6. Built 1960.
Dooley Little Learners Center	16170 Canberra, Roseville	Preschool programs. Built 1965.
