= Alex Lewis (linebacker) =

American football player (born 1981)

No. 59, 52
- Position: Linebacker

Personal information
- Born: June 11, 1981 (age 45); Delran Township, New Jersey, U.S.
- Listed height: 6 ft 0 in (1.83 m)
- Listed weight: 230 lb (104 kg)

Career information
- High school: Delran
- College: Wisconsin
- NFL draft: 2004: 5th round, 140th overall pick

Career history
- Detroit Lions (2004–2008); Omaha Nighthawks (2010)

Awards and highlights
- First-team All-Big Ten (2003)

Career NFL statistics
- Total tackles: 177
- Sacks: 2
- Forced fumbles: 3
- Fumble recoveries: 2
- Interceptions: 1
- Stats at Pro Football Reference

Alex Lewis (born June 11, 1981) is an American former professional football player who was a linebacker in the National Football League (NFL) from 2004–08 for the Detroit Lions.

== College career ==
Lewis played college football from 2000–01 with SUNY Morrisville, earning conference player of the year honors in 2001 with a reported 100 tackles and ten sacks, before transferring to the Wisconsin Badgers where he played in 2002–03.

With Wisconsin, Lewis holds the record for most tackles for a loss in a game with 6.5, which he accumulated on October 18, 2003 vs. Purdue. His performance in this game includes five sacks, good for a tie for second-most in program history. A two-year starter joining the Badgers with two years eligibility, Lewis led the Badgers in tackles in 2002, his junior season, and earned All-Big Ten First Team honors in 2003, as a senior.

== Professional career ==
Pre-draft measurables
Height	Weight	Arm length	Hand span	40-yard dash	10-yard split	20-yard split	20-yard shuttle	Three-cone drill	Vertical jump	Broad jump	Bench press
5 ft 11 3/4 in (1.82 m)	227 lb (103 kg)	32 1/2 in (0.83 m)	9 1/2 in (0.24 m)	4.74 s	1.64 s	2.73 s	4.28 s	6.84 s	41.0 in (1.04 m)	10 ft 5 in (3.18 m)	25 reps
All values from NFL Combine/Pro Day

Lewis was selected by the Detroit Lions in the fifth round of the 2004 NFL draft with the 140th overall pick.

Lewis had his most statistically prolific season of his NFL career as a rookie in 2004, playing in 15 games making 59 tackles (44 solo), two sacks, and an interception as he saw time on the field both defensively and on special teams. Lewis opened the 2005 season as a starting strong-side linebacker, but suffered a season-ending ankle injury during that game, spending the remainder of the season on injured reserve.

Lewis bounced back from injury with 48 tackles (37 solo), forcing the first fumble of his NFL career, in 2006, playing 11 games, starting two, for the Lions that year. Following a successful 2006 campaign, Lewis was viewed as a reliable back-up option behind Boss Bailey at the strong-side LB position for the 2007 season, with his speed, recognition skills, and short zone passing coverage hailed as strengths. Lewis made 14 appearances, with one start, in 2007, forcing another fumble, recovering it (for the first time in his NFL career) and making 29 tackles (24 solo). Lewis would play his final year in the NFL for the infamous 2008 Detroit Lions, who became the first NFL team in history to finish a season 0-16. Lewis made 11 appearances with four starts, logging 41 tackles (31 solo) and forcing and recovering a fumble.

Lewis would be released by the Lions in July 2009.
