= Levonne Rowan =

American football player (born 1982)

No. 24
- Position: Cornerback

Personal information
- Born: November 2, 1982 (age 44); Millcreek, Pennsylvania, U.S.
- Listed height: 5 ft 11 in (1.80 m)
- Listed weight: 198 lb (90 kg)

Career information
- College: Wisconsin

Career history
- Philadelphia Eagles (2006)*; Oakland Raiders (2007)*; → Amsterdam Admirals (2007); Winnipeg Blue Bombers (2009)*
- * Offseason or practice squad member only

Levonne Rowan Jr. (born November 2, 1982) is an American former football defensive back. He played college football at Wisconsin. He also played professional football in 2007 for the Amsterdam Admirals of the NFL Europe. In 2026, he was inducted into the Pennsylvania Sports Hall of Fame, Metro Erie Chapter.
