= Vincent Burns =

American football player (1981–2024)

No. 72
- Position: Defensive end

Personal information
- Born: June 21, 1981; Valdosta, Georgia, U.S.
- Died: July 17, 2024 (aged 43)

Career information
- High school: Lowndes (Valdosta)
- College: Northern Arizona (2000); Kentucky (2001–2004)
- NFL draft: 2005: 3rd round, 92nd overall pick

Career history
- Indianapolis Colts (2005–2006)

Awards and highlights
- 2× Second-team All-SEC (2002, 2003)

Vincent Eric Burns Jr. (June 21, 1981 – July 17, 2024), nicknamed "Sweet Pea", was an American professional football defensive end who played college football at Northern Arizona University and the University of Kentucky. He was selected by the Indianapolis Colts in the third round of the 2005 NFL draft. Burns suffered an injury that sidelined him during the 2005 season and then spent the 2006 season on the Colts' practice squad, ultimately never playing a game in the NFL. Burns died on July 17, 2024, at the age of 43.
