= Arts Academy in the Woods =

Arts Academy in the Woods (AAW)
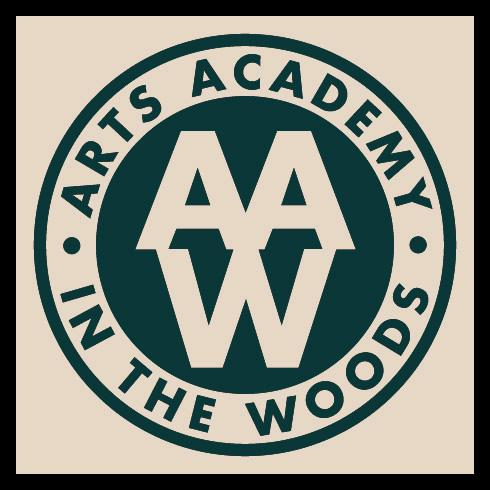

Location
- 32101 Caroline Street; Fraser, Michigan; United States
- 42.5324°N 82.9519°W

Information
- Type: Arts-oriented, charter, magnet high school and middle school
- Established: 2003
- Principal: Mrs. Francis (acting)
- Grades: 6-12
- Enrollment: 300+
- Colors: Green and white
- Affiliation: Fraser Public Schools
- Website: www.artsacad.net

Arts Academy in the Woods (AAW) is a charter, magnet high school and middle school located in Fraser, Michigan, United States. The school's educational focus is on the arts, primarily visual art, music, and performance art.

== Overview ==
Arts Academy in the Woods is chartered by the Macomb Intermediate School District's Board of Education, which oversees its operations, including finances and curriculum. The school is tuition-free and open to all Michigan students, grades 6-12, with an interest in the arts. Any secondary school student who qualifies as a resident of the State of Michigan is eligible to attend.

The academy opened in August 2001, initially only to students entering the 9th grade. The 2002-2003 year included 9th and 10th grade students. 11th grade was added in 2003-2004, and finally, a senior class (12th grade) was added in the 2004-2005 school year. 8th grade classes were held at the academy for the first time in 2019, with 6th and 7th grade classes opening in the following years.

AAW allows students to major in the arts, while also attending "regular" high school classes. The arts program is combined with a full academic curriculum including math, science, English, and languages.

== Media ==
=== School year 2008–2009 ===
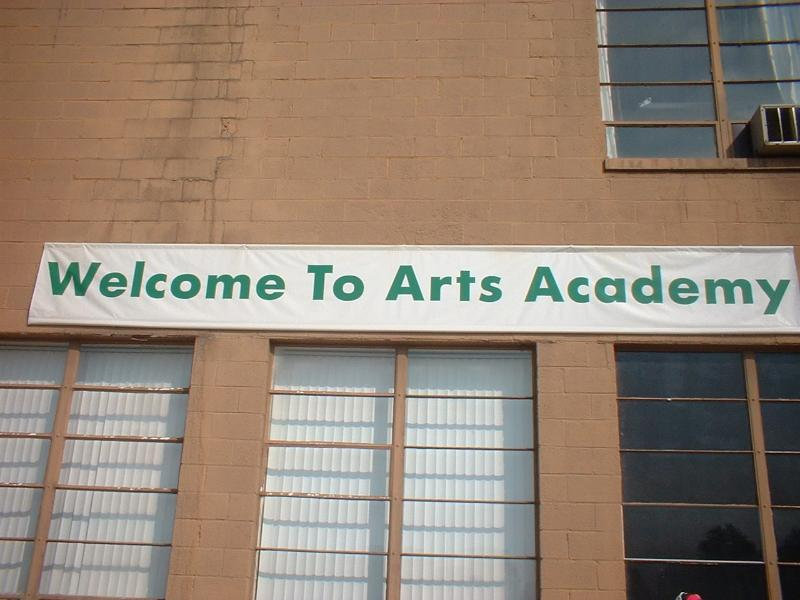
AAW welcome sign

=== School year 2007–2008 ===
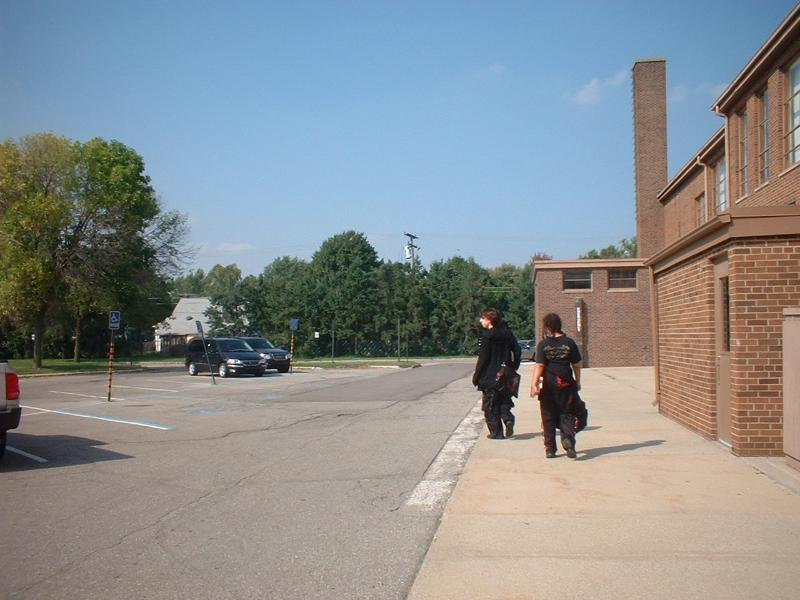
School exterior and parking lot

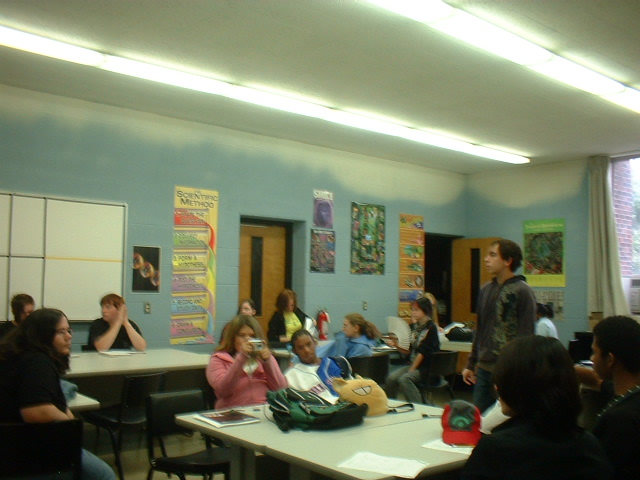
AAW Japanese Club
