= Robert Reynolds (American football) =

American football player (born 1981)

No. 51
- Position: Linebacker

Personal information
- Born: May 20, 1981 (age 45); Bowling Green, Kentucky, U.S.
- Listed height: 6 ft 3 in (1.91 m)
- Listed weight: 242 lb (110 kg)

Career information
- High school: Bowling Green
- College: Ohio State
- NFL draft: 2004: 5th round, 165th overall pick

Career history
- Tennessee Titans (2004–2007)

Awards and highlights
- BCS national champion (2002)

Career NFL statistics
- Total tackles: 43
- Fumble recoveries: 1
- Stats at Pro Football Reference

Robert Reynolds (born May 20, 1981) is an American former professional football player who was a linebacker in the National Football League (NFL). He was selected by the Tennessee Titans in the fifth round of the 2004 NFL draft. He played college football for the Ohio State Buckeyes.

== College career ==
Reynolds is known for an incident in college referred to as the Reynolds–Sorgi incident, where Reynolds intentionally choked Wisconsin Badgers quarterback Jim Sorgi, injuring Sorgi's trachea, after the play had been whistled dead.

On October 28, 2011, Reynolds made a public apology for the incident, citing his wife and four children as the reason he wanted to clear his reputation and be accountable for his actions. Reynolds also stated that he and Sorgi had made amends years prior to the interview.

== Professional career ==
Reynolds was selected by the Tennessee Titans in the fifth round (165th overall) of the 2004 NFL draft. He appeared in 14 games his rookie season including one start, recording 14 tackles.

In 2005, Reynolds appeared in all but one game for the Titans including one start and recorded a career-high 23 tackles (14 solo). In a Week 2 game against the Baltimore Ravens, Reynolds blocked a Dave Zastudil punt in the fourth quarter. The ball was recovered by Ravens safety Will Demps, who was tackled by Reynolds in the end zone for a safety.

Reynolds appeared in just four games in 2006, recording five tackles. He was placed on season-ending injured reserve on November 10 with a quadriceps injury.

A restricted free agent in the 2007 offseason, Reynolds was tendered a contract by the Titans on March 1. He signed the one-year tender offer on April 6, but was placed on injured reserve by the team on July 18.

== Personal life ==
Reynolds and his older brother, Patrick, are also believed to be the only siblings to win national championships at the BCS level (Robert) and at the I-AA level (Patrick, senior lineman for Western Kentucky's National Championship team). Both won in the 2002 season.
