= Fraser, Michigan =

- City
- Motto: "A Centennial Community"
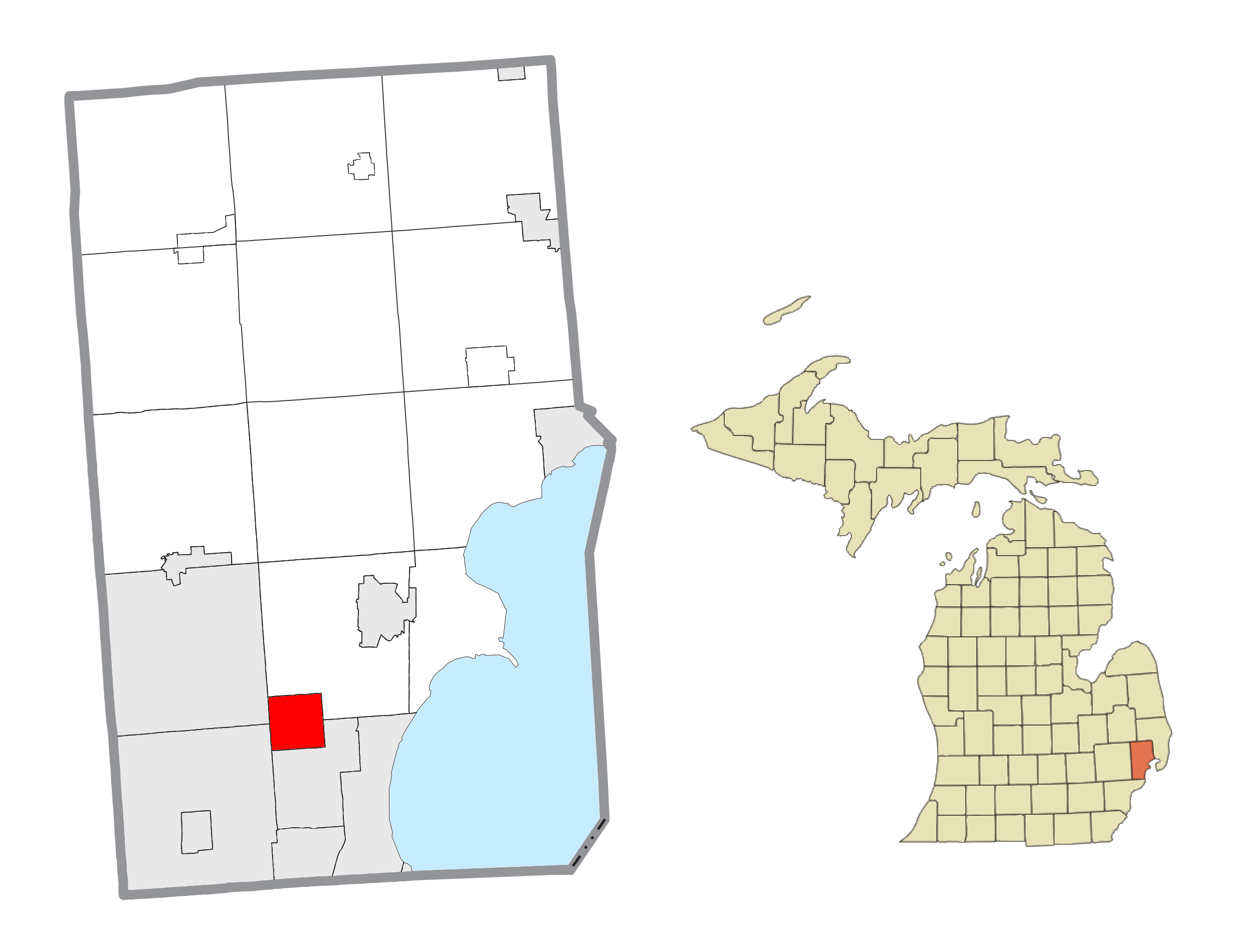
- Location within Macomb County

- Location within Michigan Location within the United States
- Coordinates: 42°32′11″N 82°57′02″W
- Country: United States
- State: Michigan
- County: Macomb

Government
  - Mayor: Michael Lesich

Area
  - Total: 4.16 sq mi (10.77 km^{2})
  - Land: 4.14 sq mi (10.73 km^{2})
  - Water: 0.015 sq mi (0.04 km^{2})
- Elevation: 610 ft (186 m)

Population (2020)
  - Total: 14,726
  - Estimate (2023): 14,434
  - Density: 3,484/sq mi (1,345.2/km^{2})
- Time zone: UTC-5 (Eastern (EST))
  - Summer (DST): UTC-4 (EDT)
- ZIP Code: 48026
- Area code: 586
- FIPS code: 26-30420
- GNIS feature ID: 0626432
- Website: www.frasercitymi.gov

Fraser is a city in Macomb County in the U.S. state of Michigan. A northern suburb of Detroit, Fraser is located roughly 15 miles (24.1 km) northeast of downtown Detroit. As of the 2020 census, the city had a population of 14,726.

== History ==
The village of Fraser was incorporated by an act of the state legislature in 1894. It was named for a lawyer from Detroit named Alexander J. Frazer. The city of Fraser was established by home rule charter November 7, 1956, and adopted by the electors on December 26, 1956.

== Geography ==
Fraser is in southern Macomb County, six miles (10 km) southwest of Mount Clemens, the county seat, and 15 miles (24 km) northeast of downtown Detroit. The city is nearly square, bounded by 15 Mile Road, Kelly Road, 13 Mile Road, and Hayes Road. It is bordered to the north and northeast by Clinton Charter Township, to the southeast and south by Roseville, to the southwest by Warren, and to the northwest by Sterling Heights. Highway M-97 (Groesbeck Highway) passes through the southeast part of the city, connecting Mount Clemens and Detroit.

According to the U.S. Census Bureau, Fraser has a total area of 4.16 square miles (10.77 km^{2}), of which 4.14 square miles (10.72 km^{2}) are land and 0.02 square miles (0.05 km^{2}), or 0.38%, are water. Harrington Drain and its tributary, Sweeny Drain, flow northward through the city, Harrington Drain joining the Clinton River, a tributary of Lake St. Clair, in Mount Clemens.

== Climate ==
This climatic region is typified by large seasonal temperature differences, with warm to hot (and often humid) summers and cold (sometimes severely cold) winters. According to the Köppen Climate Classification system, Fraser has a humid continental climate, abbreviated "Dfb" on climate maps.

== Demographics ==
Historical population
| Census | Pop. | Note | %± |
|---|---|---|---|
| 1900 | 252 | | — |
| 1910 | 220 | | −12.7% |
| 1920 | 247 | | 12.3% |
| 1930 | 600 | | 142.9% |
| 1940 | 747 | | 24.5% |
| 1950 | 1,379 | | 84.6% |
| 1960 | 7,027 | | 409.6% |
| 1970 | 11,868 | | 68.9% |
| 1980 | 14,560 | | 22.7% |
| 1990 | 13,899 | | −4.5% |
| 2000 | 15,297 | | 10.1% |
| 2010 | 14,480 | | −5.3% |
| 2020 | 14,726 | | 1.7% |
| 2023 (est.) | 14,434 | | −2.0% |
U.S. Decennial Census

=== 2020 census ===
As of the 2020 census, Fraser had a population of 14,726. The median age was 44.0 years. 18.7% of residents were under the age of 18 and 19.8% of residents were 65 years of age or older. For every 100 females there were 87.0 males, and for every 100 females age 18 and over there were 83.8 males age 18 and over.

100.0% of residents lived in urban areas, while 0.0% lived in rural areas.

There were 6,279 households in Fraser, of which 25.9% had children under the age of 18 living in them. Of all households, 42.4% were married-couple households, 17.6% were households with a male householder and no spouse or partner present, and 34.2% were households with a female householder and no spouse or partner present. About 32.7% of all households were made up of individuals and 15.9% had someone living alone who was 65 years of age or older.

There were 6,469 housing units, of which 2.9% were vacant. The homeowner vacancy rate was 0.6% and the rental vacancy rate was 4.1%.

Racial composition as of the 2020 census
| Race | Number | Percent |
|---|---|---|
| White | 12,022 | 81.6% |
| Black or African American | 1,338 | 9.1% |
| American Indian and Alaska Native | 59 | 0.4% |
| Asian | 315 | 2.1% |
| Native Hawaiian and Other Pacific Islander | 4 | 0.0% |
| Some other race | 70 | 0.5% |
| Two or more races | 918 | 6.2% |
| Hispanic or Latino (of any race) | 401 | 2.7% |

=== 2010 census ===
As of the census of 2010, there were 14,480 people, 6,105 households, and 3,954 families living in the city. The population density was 3,497.6 inhabitants per square mile (1,350.4/km^{2}). There were 6,448 housing units at an average density of 1,557.5 per square mile (601.4/km^{2}). The racial makeup of the city was 92.0% White, 3.9% African American, 0.5% Native American, 1.5% Asian, 0.3% from other races, and 1.8% from two or more races. Hispanic or Latino residents of any race were 2.1% of the population.

There were 6,105 households, of which 29.0% had children under the age of 18 living with them, 46.4% were married couples living together, 14.1% had a female householder with no husband present, 4.3% had a male householder with no wife present, and 35.2% were non-families. 31.4% of all households were made up of individuals, and 14.5% had someone living alone who was 65 years of age or older. The average household size was 2.36 and the average family size was 2.96.

The median age in the city was 42.9 years. 21.4% of residents were under the age of 18; 7.8% were between the ages of 18 and 24; 24.1% were from 25 to 44; 30.6% were from 45 to 64; and 16.2% were 65 years of age or older. The gender makeup of the city was 46.4% male and 53.6% female.

=== 2000 census ===
As of the census of 2000, there were 15,297 people, 6,062 households, and 4,122 families living in the city. The population density was 3,652.5 inhabitants per square mile (1,410.2/km^{2}). There were 6,178 housing units at an average density of 1,475.2 per square mile (569.6/km^{2}). The racial makeup of the city was 96.67% White, 0.91% African American, 0.26% Native American, 0.93% Asian, 0.01% Pacific Islander, 0.21% from other races, and 1.01% from two or more races. Hispanic or Latino residents of any race were 1.33% of the population.

There were 6,062 households, out of which 31.7% had children under the age of 18 living with them, 53.0% were married couples living together, 12.5% had a female householder with no husband present, and 32.0% were non-families. 28.2% of all households were made up of individuals, and 12.7% had someone living alone who was 65 years of age or older. The average household size was 2.49 and the average family size was 3.08.

In the city, 24.2% of the population was under the age of 18, 7.9% was from 18 to 24, 29.1% from 25 to 44, 23.4% from 45 to 64, and 15.4% was 65 years of age or older. The median age was 39 years. For every 100 females, there were 87.1 males. For every 100 females age 18 and over, there were 81.8 males.

The median income for a household in the city was $50,339, and the median income for a family was $64,119. Males had a median income of $50,243 versus $29,254 for females. The per capita income for the city was $22,864. About 3.4% of families and 4.2% of the population were below the poverty line, including 5.3% of those under age 18 and 4.4% of those age 65 or over.

== Education ==
Fraser Public Schools is the public school system in Fraser. The district scores above the state average on the MEAP Test.

Also located in Fraser is the Arts Academy in the Woods, a free public charter academy dedicated to students interested in pursuing fine and performing arts.

== Sports ==
In 2006, the girls' varsity basketball team, coached by David Kuppe, became the second Macomb County girls' basketball team to make it to the state finals.

In 1981, Fraser's football team was led by Mark Garalczyk to the state championships.

== Notable people ==
- The Amazing Johnathan, entertainer and Las Vegas icon
- Charles Davis, former Jacksonville Jaguars and Purdue tight end
- Joe Decker, former Major League Baseball pitcher
- August Charles Fruehauf, founder of the Fruehauf Corporation
- Rylend Grant, screenwriter/comic book creator
- Jason Hartless, musician
- Pat Hentgen, former Major League Baseball pitcher; Cy Young Award winner
- Chad LaRose, former Carolina Hurricanes Stanley Cup winner
- Maribeth Monroe, actress
- Jim Sorgi, former Indianapolis Colts quarterback
