= Lee Evans (American football) =

American football player (born 1981)

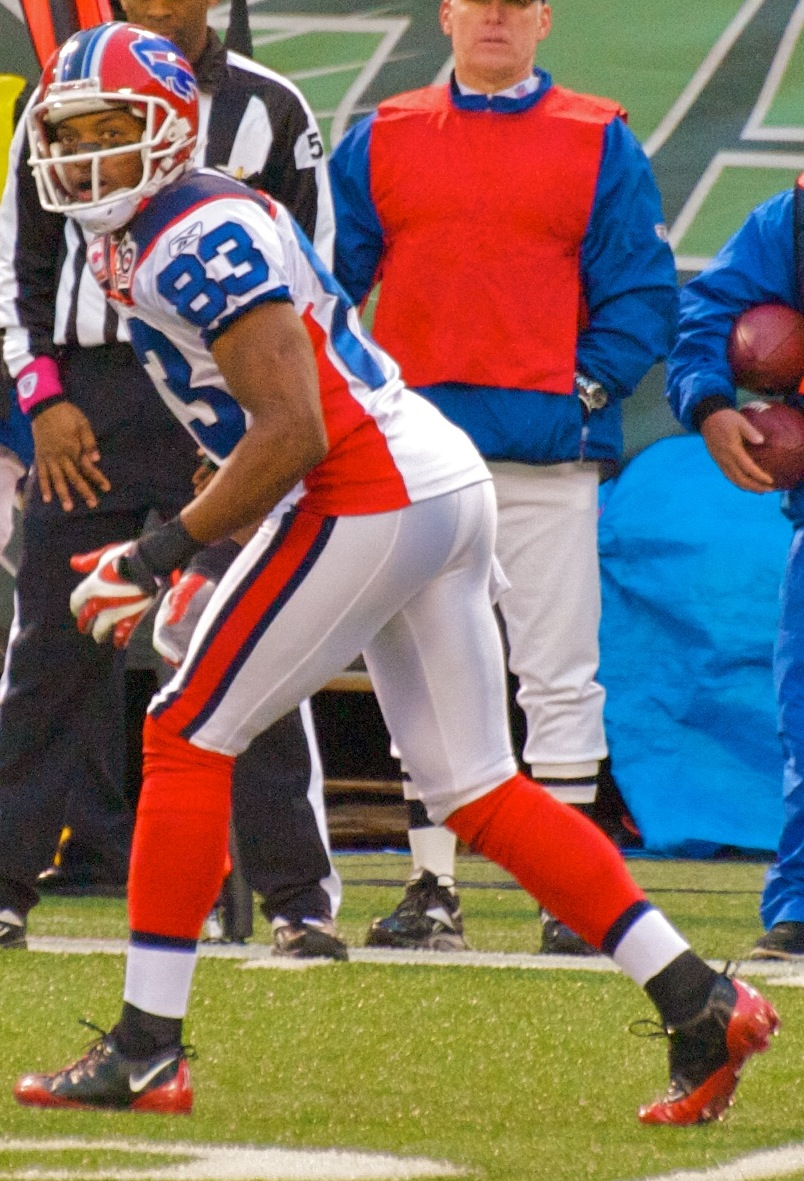
- Evans with the Buffalo Bills in 2009

No. 83
- Position: Wide receiver

Personal information
- Born: March 11, 1981 (age 45); Bedford, Ohio, U.S.
- Listed height: 5 ft 10 in (1.78 m)
- Listed weight: 197 lb (89 kg)

Career information
- High school: Bedford
- College: Wisconsin (1999–2003)
- NFL draft: 2004: 1st round, 13th overall pick

Career history
- Buffalo Bills (2004–2010); Baltimore Ravens (2011); Jacksonville Jaguars (2012)*
- * Offseason or practice squad member only

Awards and highlights
- First-team All-American (2001); 2× First-team All-Big Ten (2001, 2003)

Career NFL statistics
- Receptions: 381
- Receiving yards: 6,008
- Receiving touchdowns: 43
- Stats at Pro Football Reference

Lee Evans III (born March 11, 1981) is an American former professional football player who was a wide receiver in the National Football League (NFL). He played college football for the Wisconsin Badgers. Evans was selected by the Buffalo Bills in the first round of the 2004 NFL draft with the 13th overall pick. He also played for the Baltimore Ravens.

As the highest drafted receiver for the Bills since Jerry Butler, Evans emerged as a dangerous deep threat for the team. He still ranks among the top five receivers in Bills history in terms of receptions, yards, and touchdowns, despite never making the Pro Bowl.

== Early life ==
Evans was born in Bedford, Ohio, a suburb located southeast of Cleveland, and attended Bedford High School. Evans was also a high hurdler, with personal-bests of 13.59 seconds in the 110 metres hurdles and 37.32 seconds in the 300 metres hurdles.

== College career ==
Evans caught 30 passes for 528 yards and 5 touchdowns in his freshman season at Wisconsin in 2000.

In 2001, Evans put together an incredible season despite having three different quarterbacks (Brooks Bollinger, Jim Sorgi, and Matt Schabert) during the year. Evans caught 75 passes for 1,545 yards (an average of 20.1 yards per reception) and 9 touchdowns.

Evans tore his ACL in the 2002 Spring Game and missed the entire season.

In Evans's last year at Wisconsin in 2003, he caught 64 passes for 1,213 yards and 13 touchdowns. A notable game that year was the 56–21 victory against the Michigan State Spartans: Evans caught 10 passes for 258 yards and 5 touchdowns.

== Professional career ==
Pre-draft measurables
Height	Weight	Arm length	Hand span	40-yard dash	10-yard split	20-yard split	20-yard shuttle	Three-cone drill	Vertical jump	Broad jump	Wonderlic
5 ft 10 7/8 in (1.80 m)	197 lb (89 kg)	32 3/8 in (0.82 m)	9 1/8 in (0.23 m)	4.40 s	1.60 s	2.63 s	4.02 s	6.74 s	34.5 in (0.88 m)	10 ft 0 in (3.05 m)	27
All values from NFL Combine

=== Buffalo Bills ===
The Buffalo Bills selected Evans with the 13th overall pick in the first round of the 2004 NFL draft. Lee was the first wide receiver since Eric Moulds in 1996 to be taken by the Bills in the first round.

Evans was initially assigned the jersey number 84. Evans, as a reference to his full name, had always worn the number 3 in college, a number that was not allowed to be used in the National Football League for wide receivers. At that time, receivers and tight ends were only allowed to wear uniform numbers 80–89. Evans, in order to include the number 3 somewhere in his jersey number, instead chose 83, which required special permission; the Bills had set aside the number after the retirement of former Bills great Andre Reed.

The Bills' first-round draft pick moved into the starting lineup in his first season and emerged as one of the Bills' best players on offense. He caught 48 passes for 843 yards and 9 touchdowns as a rookie. The nine touchdowns remains a Bills rookie record.

During a game between the Bills and Miami Dolphins on December 4, 2005, Evans faced off against his former teammate on the Wisconsin Badgers, Chris Chambers. Evans set then career highs with receiving yards (117) and touchdowns (3), but Chambers set Miami franchise records for receptions (15) and receiving yards (238) as well as scoring the game-winning touchdown in the final seconds.

Evans quickly became a fan-favorite among Bills fans. After the departure of Eric Moulds, he established himself as the Bills' top receiver in 2006 with 82 receptions for 1,292 receiving yards and 8 touchdowns. He became a big ally for then starting quarterback J. P. Losman in the passing game, establishing himself as a deep threat at wide receiver. On November 19, 2006, in a game against the Houston Texans, he set the Buffalo Bills record for receiving yards in one quarter (205) and one game (265). He also became the first player in league history to record two 80-yard-plus touchdowns in one quarter when he caught two 83-yard touchdown passes in the first quarter.

In a 2007 game against the New York Jets, Evans wrestled a long pass away from Jets rookie cornerback Darrelle Revis, which resulted in an 85-yard touchdown reception to clinch the game for the Bills as they won 13–3.

Evans underwent minor shoulder surgery in the 2008 offseason. Coach Dick Jauron stated that the shoulder had been bothering Evans for the previous two years. The offseason surgery did not seem to slow Evans down in the 2008 season as he recorded his second 1,000 yards receiving season with 63 receptions, 1,017 yards, and three touchdowns, including an 87-yard score from Losman, who had since been relegated to the backup for Trent Edwards. Despite his strong play the Bills missed the postseason at 7–9. The next two seasons were less successful for Evans, as his yardage and touchdown count regressed both years with Terrell Owens and later Stevie Johnson taking over Evans' role as Buffalo's top receiver.

On December 12, 2010, Evans injured his ankle against the Cleveland Browns and was placed on injured reserve, which would be the last time he suited up for the Bills. Evans finished his Buffalo career with the third most receiving yards (5,934) and touchdowns (43) in franchise history, in addition to the fourth most receptions (377), which included six passes that each went for more than 70 yards.

=== Baltimore Ravens ===
On August 12, 2011, Evans was traded to the Baltimore Ravens for a 4th round pick in the 2012 NFL draft. He missed a fair amount of the season with injuries. Evans played in 9 games, and finished the season with four receptions for 74 yards. In the AFC Championship Game, a pass was thrown to Evans in the end zone that if caught, would have likely secured a trip to Super Bowl XLVI for the Ravens. The football hit Evans in the hands, but was knocked out by New England Patriots cornerback Sterling Moore. Two plays later, Billy Cundiff missed a field goal that would have sent the game into overtime, and the Patriots won.

=== Jacksonville Jaguars ===
On April 15, 2012, Evans signed a one-year contract with the Jacksonville Jaguars. He was released on August 12.

=== Retirement ===
In 2012, after he was released by the Jacksonville Jaguars, Evans announced his retirement.

== NFL career statistics ==
Legend
**Bold**	Career high

=== Regular season ===
Year	Team	Games		Receiving					
Year	Team	GP	GS	Tgt	Rec	Yds	Avg	Lng	TD
2004	BUF	16	11	74	48	843	17.6	69	**9**
2005	BUF	16	15	92	48	743	15.5	65	7
2006	BUF	16	15	**137**	**82**	**1,292**	15.8	83	8
2007	BUF	16	16	113	55	849	15.4	85	5
2008	BUF	16	16	102	63	1,017	16.1	**87**	3
2009	BUF	16	16	96	44	612	13.9	50	7
2010	BUF	13	13	84	37	578	15.6	54	4
2011	BAL	9	2	26	4	74	**18.5**	32	0
Total		118	104	724	381	6,008	15.8	87	43

=== Postseason ===
Year	Team	Games		Receiving					
Year	Team	GP	GS	Tgt	Rec	Yds	Avg	Lng	TD
2011	BAL	2	0	5	4	69	17.3	30	0
Total		2	0	5	4	69	17.3	30	0
