= Jonathan Welsh (American football) =

American football player (born 1982)

No. 99
- Position: Defensive end

Personal information
- Born: June 9, 1982 (age 44); Houston, Texas, U.S.
- Listed height: 6 ft 4 in (1.93 m)
- Listed weight: 231 lb (105 kg)

Career information
- High school: Booker T. Washington (Houston)
- College: Wisconsin
- NFL draft: 2005: 5th round, 148th overall pick

Career history
- Indianapolis Colts (2005–2006)

Career NFL statistics
- Games played: 6
- Total tackles: 4
- Stats at Pro Football Reference

Jonathan Welsh (born June 9, 1982) is an American former professional football player who was a defensive end in the National Football League (NFL). From 2005 to 2007, he played for the Indianapolis Colts. He played college football for the Wisconsin Badgers and was selected by the Colts in the fifth round of the 2005 NFL draft.
