= Jim Sorgi =

American football player (born 1980)

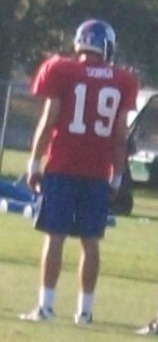
- Sorgi with the New York Giants in 2010

No. 12, 19
- Position: Quarterback

Personal information
- Born: December 3, 1980 (age 45); Fraser, Michigan, U.S.
- Listed height: 6 ft 5 in (1.96 m)
- Listed weight: 196 lb (89 kg)

Career information
- High school: Fraser
- College: Wisconsin (1999–2003)
- NFL draft: 2004: 6th round, 193rd overall pick

Career history
- Indianapolis Colts (2004–2009); New York Giants (2010)

Awards and highlights
- Super Bowl champion (XLI)

Career NFL statistics
- TD–INT: 6–1
- Passing yards: 929
- Passer rating: 89.9
- Stats at Pro Football Reference

James Joseph Sorgi Jr. (born December 3, 1980) is an American former professional football player who was a quarterback in the National Football League (NFL). He played college football for the Wisconsin Badgers and was selected by the Indianapolis Colts in the sixth round of the 2004 NFL draft. Sorgi served as the backup to Peyton Manning for several years, and won a ring when the Colts won Super Bowl XLI. Once he was released by the Colts, he signed with the New York Giants as the backup to Eli Manning, but was injured in a preseason game, and was placed on IR.

== Early life ==
Sorgi attended Fraser High School in Fraser, Michigan and was a letterwinner in football, basketball, and baseball. In football, he was the two-time Team Most Valuable Player, and as a senior, he garnered All-League honors, All-County honors, and All-State honors, and was a USA Today Honorable Mention All-USA selection. In baseball, he posted a batting average of .450 as a senior.

== College career ==
Sorgi played college football for the Wisconsin Badgers. Sorgi was Wisconsin's career pass efficiency leader (141.2), co-holder of most passing touchdowns in one game (five) and sixth in career passing yards in Wisconsin history.

In an incident on October 11, 2003, referred to as the Reynolds–Sorgi incident, Ohio State linebacker Robert Reynolds intentionally choked Sorgi, injuring Sorgi's trachea, after the play had been whistled dead. Sorgi was unable to play for the remainder of the game, struggling to breathe and unable to speak. On October 28, 2011, Reynolds made a public apology for the incident, citing his wife and four children as the reason he wanted to clear his reputation and be accountable for his actions. Reynolds also stated that he and Sorgi had made amends years prior to the interview.

- 2000: 45/67 for 592 yards with 6 touchdowns vs 1 interception.
- 2001: 64/132 for 1,096 yards with 9 touchdowns vs 8 interception. 30 carries for 34 yards and 2 touchdowns.
- 2002: 38/70 for 536 yards with 1 touchdown vs 2 interception.
- 2003: 140/248 for 2,251 yards with 17 touchdown vs 9 interception.

== Professional career ==
Pre-draft measurables
Height	Weight	40-yard dash	20-yard shuttle	Three-cone drill	Vertical jump	Broad jump	Wonderlic
6 ft 3 3/8 in (1.91 m)	207 lb (94 kg)	4.68 s	4.31 s	7.10 s	32.5 in (0.83 m)	10 ft 0 in (3.05 m)	15
All values from Pro Day

=== Indianapolis Colts ===
Sorgi was selected 193rd overall in the sixth round in the 2004 NFL draft by the Indianapolis Colts. While there, Sorgi proved to be an adequate back-up to starting quarterback Peyton Manning. In his first season, Sorgi played against the Denver Broncos, throwing for 175 yards and 2 touchdowns. That was his only appearance that season. In the 2005 NFL season, he gained slightly more playing time, and completed 42 of 61 attempts for 444 yards. The bulk of his playing time in 2005 came against the Seattle Seahawks at the end of the regular season.

In the 2008 season, he did not take the field until the final regular season game. He had a majority of the playing time in the 2008 preseason, as Manning was recovering from knee surgery. As of the end of the 2008 regular season, he had six career touchdown passes and one interception. On December 9, 2009, Sorgi was placed on injured reserve due to a torn labrum in his right shoulder. Sorgi was released by Indianapolis on March 5, 2010.

=== New York Giants ===
Sorgi signed with the New York Giants on March 9, 2010. Entering camp, Sorgi was expected to back up starting quarterback Eli Manning, but in a preseason game against the New York Jets, Sorgi tore the capsule in his right shoulder, and was later placed on season-ending Injured Reserve. Following the season, he became an unrestricted free agent.

== Personal life ==
Sorgi currently resides in Pittsboro, Indiana with his wife Lana and sons, Jimmy III, Jack and Jace. Jack is currently committed to Sorgi's alma mater, Wisconsin.

He is the co-owner of Pro Team Tactical Performance.
