= 2001 Indianapolis Colts season =

49th season in franchise history

- Owner: Jim Irsay
- General manager: Bill Polian
- Head coach: Jim Mora
- Home stadium: RCA Dome

Results
- Record: 6–10
- Division place: 4th AFC East
- Playoffs: Did not qualify
- Pro Bowlers: WR Marvin Harrison; TE Ken Dilger

The 2001 Indianapolis Colts season was the 49th season for the team in the National Football League (NFL) and 18th in Indianapolis. The Colts failed to improve on their 10–6 record from 2000 and finished the season with a record of 6–10, finished fourth in the AFC East division, and missed the playoffs for the first time since 1998. In the process the Colts allowed 486 points in sixteen games, an average of 30 points per match and the franchise worst since the 1981 Colts who allowed 533. At the time only the aforementioned Colts, the 1980 New Orleans Saints and the 1966 New York Giants (in a 14-game schedule) had ever allowed more points. This would be the last time the Colts would miss the playoffs until 2011 and the only time in the 2000s decade in which they didn't qualify.

This was the Colts' final season as a member of the AFC East, as they would move to the newly formed AFC South in the 2002 league re-alignment. It was also the final season Mark Rypien would play in the NFL.

== Offseason ==
Additions	Subtractions
DT Christian Peter (Giants)	QB Kelly Holcomb (Browns)
LB Sean Harris (Bears)	S Jason Belser (Chiefs)
DT Mike Wells (Bears)	LB Cornelius Bennett (retirement)
LB Ryan Phillips (Giants)	DT Larry Chester (Panthers)

=== NFL draft ===
2001 Indianapolis Colts draft
Round	Pick	Player	Position	College	Notes
1	30	Reggie Wayne *	WR	Miami (FL)	from NY Giants
2	37	Idrees Bashir	FS	Memphis	from Dallas
3	91	Cory Bird	SS	Virginia Tech	from NY Giants
4	118	Ryan Diem	OT	Northern Illinois	
5	152	Raymond Walls	CB	Southern Mississippi	
6	193	Jason Doering	FS	Wisconsin	from NY Giants
7	220	Rick DeMulling	OG	Idaho	
Made roster † Pro Football Hall of Fame * Made at least one Pro Bowl during career

=== Undrafted free agents ===
2001 undrafted free agents of note
Player	Position	College
Nick Harper	Cornerback	Fort Valley State
Aaron Jones	Wide receiver	Utah State
Dave Meyer	Quarterback	Virginia Tech
Dominic Rhodes	Running Back	Midwestern State
Dwayne Wilmot	Wide receiver	Maine

== Personnel ==
=== Staff ===
2001 Indianapolis Colts staff
Front office: Owner and chief executive officer – Jim Irsay; President – Bill Polian; Director of football operations – Dom Anile; Director of pro player personnel – Clyde Powers; Assistant director of football operations – Chris Polian; Director of player development – Steve Champlin; Coordinator of player personnel – John Becker; Director of college scouting – Mike Butler; Head coaches: Head coach – Jim E. Mora; Assistant head coach/defensive backs – George Catavolos; Offensive coaches: Offensive coordinator – Tom Moore; Quarterbacks – John Hufnagel; Running backs – Gene Huey; Receivers – Jay Norvell; Tight ends – Tony Marciano; Offensive line – Howard Mudd	Defensive coaches: Defensive coordinator – Vic Fangio; Defensive line – Todd Grantham; Linebackers – Mike Murphy; Defensive assistant – John Pagano; Special teams coaches: Special teams – Kevin Spencer; Strength and conditioning: Strength and conditioning – Jon Torine; Assistant strength and conditioning – Richard Howell

=== Roster ===
Indianapolis Colts 2001 final roster
Quarterbacks: 18 Peyton Manning; 16 Mark Rypien; Running backs: 36 Jim Finn FB; 43 Kevin McDougal; 44 Wes Ours; 33 Dominic Rhodes KR; 30 Shyrone Stith; Wide receivers: 88 Marvin Harrison; 83 Trevor Insley PR; 12 Desmond Kitchings; 15 Tony Simmons; 87 Reggie Wayne; 80 Terrence Wilkins KR/PR; Tight ends: 49 Joe Dean Davenport; 85 Ken Dilger; 81 Marcus Pollard	Offensive linemen: 64 Rick DeMulling G; 71 Ryan Diem G/T; 78 Tarik Glenn T; 74 Waverly Jackson G/T; 76 Steve McKinney G; 73 Adam Meadows T; 50 Larry Moore C/G; 63 Jeff Saturday C; Defensive linemen: 93 Lionel Barnes DE; 92 Chad Bratzke DE; 62 Ellis Johnson DT; 91 Chukie Nwokorie DE; 67 Hans Olsen DT; 99 Brad Scioli DE; 90 Mark Thomas DE; 96 Josh Williams DT; 95 Mike Wells DT	Linebackers: 94 Rob Morris MLB; 51 Mike Morton OLB; 52 Mike Peterson OLB; 56 Ryan Phillips OLB; 98 Sam Sword MLB; 54 Donnel Thompson MLB; 53 Marcus Washington OLB; Defensive backs: 28 Idrees Bashir FS; 41 Cory Bird SS; 26 Rodregis Brooks CB; 20 Jeff Burris CB; 37 Chad Cota SS; 31 Clifton Crosby CB; 34 Jason Doering FS; 25 Nick Harper CB; 27 David Macklin CB; 42 Raymond Walls CB; Special teams: 17 Hunter Smith P; 48 Justin Snow LS; 13 Mike Vanderjagt K	Reserve lists: 2 Troy Albea WR (IR); 69 Ben Gilbert G (IR); 84 Drew Haddad WR (IR); 47 Jermaine Hampton CB (IR); 55 Sean Harris LB (IR); 32 Edgerrin James RB (IR); 86 Jerome Pathon WR (IR); 97 Christian Peter DT (IR); 72 Tim Ridder G (IR); Practice squad: 10 Isaac Jones WR; 61 Rob Murphy G; 11 Cory Sauter QB; rookies in italics 53 active, 9 inactive, 3 practice squad

== Regular season ==
=== Schedule ===
Week	Date	Opponent	Result	Record	Venue	Attendance
1	September 9	at New York Jets	W 45–24	1–0	Giants Stadium	78,606
2 (Note: The Colts were originally scheduled to host the Denver Broncos during Week 2 of the original NFL schedule (September 16) at RCA Dome. However, due to the September 11 attacks, the game was rescheduled to Week 17.)	September 23	Buffalo Bills	W 42–26	2–0	RCA Dome	56,135
3	September 30	at New England Patriots	L 13–44	2–1	Foxboro Stadium	60,292
4	Bye					
5	October 14	Oakland Raiders	L 18–23	2–2	RCA Dome	56,972
6	October 21	New England Patriots	L 17–38	2–3	RCA Dome	56,022
7	October 25	at Kansas City Chiefs	W 35–28	3–3	Arrowhead Stadium	74,212
8	November 4	at Buffalo Bills	W 30–14	4–3	Ralph Wilson Stadium	63,786
9	November 11	Miami Dolphins	L 24–27	4–4	RCA Dome	57,127
10	November 18	at New Orleans Saints	L 20–34	4–5	Louisiana Superdome	70,020
11	November 25	San Francisco 49ers	L 21–40	4–6	RCA Dome	56,393
12	December 2	at Baltimore Ravens	L 27–39	4–7	PSINet Stadium	69,382
13	December 10	at Miami Dolphins	L 6–41	4–8	Pro Player Stadium	73,858
14	December 16	Atlanta Falcons	W 41–27	5–8	RCA Dome	55,603
15	December 23	New York Jets	L 28–29	5–9	RCA Dome	56,302
16	December 30	at St. Louis Rams	L 17–42	5–10	Trans World Dome	66,084
17	January 6	Denver Broncos	W 29–10	6–10	RCA Dome	56,192

=== Standings ===
AFC East
	W	L	T	PCT	PF	PA	STK
^{(2)} New England Patriots	11	5	0	.688	371	272	W6
^{(4)} Miami Dolphins	11	5	0	.688	344	290	W2
^{(6)} New York Jets	10	6	0	.625	308	295	W1
Indianapolis Colts	6	10	0	.375	413	486	W1
Buffalo Bills	3	13	0	.188	265	420	L1

=== Game summaries ===
==== Week 1: at New York Jets ====
Week 1: Indianapolis Colts at New York Jets – Game summary

Quarter	1	2	3	4	Total
Colts	3	28	7	7	45
Jets	7	7	3	7	24

at Giants Stadium, East Rutherford, New Jersey

- Date: September 9
- Game time: 1:00 p.m. EDT
- Game weather: Sunny, 81 °F (27 °C)
- Game attendance: 78,606
- Referee: Perry Havener
- TV announcers (CBS): Greg Gumbel, Phil Simms and Armen Keteyian

Game information

First quarter

- NYJ – Laveranues Coles 38-yard pass from Vinny Testaverde (John Hall kick), 10:58. Jets 7-0. Drive: 3 plays, 39 yards, 1:28.
- IND - Mike Vanderjagt 37-yard field goal, 6:20. Jets 7-3. Drive: 10 plays, 53 yards, 4:38.

Second quarter

- IND - Edgerrin James 29-yard run (Mike Vanderjagt kick), 14:55. Colts 10-7. Drive: 10 plays, 75 yards, 4:28.
- IND - Edgerrin James 1-yard run (Mike Vanderjagt kick), 7:29. Colts 17-7. Drive: 4 plays, 22 yards, 2:17.
- NYJ - Curtis Martin 6-yard run (John Hall kick), 3:30. Colts 17-14. Drive: 1 play, 6 yards, 0:07.
- IND - Jerome Pathon 21-yard pass from Peyton Manning (Mike Vanderjagt kick), 1:29. Colts 24-14. Drive: 8 plays, 80 yards, 2:01.
- IND - Terrence Wilkins 78-yard punt return (Mike Vanderjagt kick), 0:20. Colts 31-14.

Third quarter

- NYJ - John Hall 22-yard field goal, 11:27. Colts 31-17. Drive: 7 plays, 15 yards, 2:42.
- IND - Marcus Pollard 5-yard pass from Peyton Manning (Mike Vanderjagt kick), 5:46. Colts 38-17. Drive: 11 plays, 75 yards, 5:41.

Fourth quarter

- NYJ - Richie Anderson 5-yard pass from Vinny Testaverde (John Hall kick), 14:56. Colts 38-24. Drive: 10 plays, 64 yards, 5:50.
- IND - Chukie Nwokorie 95-yard fumble return (Mike Vanderjagt kick), 5:17. Colts 45-24. Drive: 11 plays, 65 yards, 7:20.

Top passers

- IND - Peyton Manning - 22/32, 231 yards, 2 TD, 2 INT
- NYJ - Vinny Testaverde - 17/25, 175 yards, 2 TD

Top rushers

- IND - Edgerrin James - 28 rushes, 135 yards, 2 TD
- NYJ - Curtis Martin - 20 rushes, 79 yards, TD

Top receivers

- IND - Jerome Pathon - 8 receptions, 93 yards, TD
- NYJ - Anthony Becht - 4 receptions, 58 yards

==== Week 2: vs. Buffalo Bills ====
Week 2: Buffalo Bills at Indianapolis Colts – Game summary

Quarter	1	2	3	4	Total
Bills	7	10	3	6	26
Colts	14	21	7	0	42

at RCA Dome, Indianapolis, Indiana

- Date: September 23
- Game time: 1:00 p.m. EDT
- Game weather: Played indoors (domed stadium)
- Game attendance: 56,135
- Referee: Bill Carollo
- TV announcers (CBS): Don Criqui and Steve Tasker

Game information

First quarter

- BUF - Nate Clements 48-yard interception return (Jake Arians kick), 12:50. Bills 7-0. Drive: 4 plays, 15 yards, 2:10.
- IND - Edgerrin James 1-yard run (Mike Vanderjagt kick), 5:12. Tied 7-7. Drive: 10 plays, 90 yards, 5:29.
- IND - Jerome Pathon 60-yard pass from Peyton Manning (Mike Vanderjagt kick), 1:35. Colts 14-7. Drive: 2 plays, 76 yards, 0:52.

Second quarter

- BUF - Travis Henry 4-yard run (Jake Arians kick), 12:00. Tied 14-14. Drive: 8 plays, 84 yards, 4:35.
- IND - Marvin Harrison 39-yard pass from Peyton Manning (Mike Vanderjagt kick), 11:19. Colts 21-14. Drive: 2 plays, 61 yards, 0:41.
- IND - Marvin Harrison 39-yard pass from Peyton Manning (Mike Vanderjagt kick), 9:11. Colts 28-14. Drive: 2 plays, 41 yards, 0:35.
- BUF - Jake Arians 48-yard field goal, 4:13. Colts 28-17. Drive: 9 plays, 31 yards, 4:58.
- IND - Marvin Harrison 7-yard pass from Peyton Manning (Mike Vanderjagt kick), 1:00. Colts 35-17. Drive: 9 plays, 80 yards, 3:13.

Third quarter

- BUF - Jake Arians 49-yard field goal, 10:35. Colts 35-20. Drive: 8 plays, 41 yards, 4:25.
- IND - Peyton Manning 1-yard run (Mike Vanderjagt kick), 5:57. Colts 42-20. Drive: 10 plays, 60 yards, 4:38.

Fourth quarter

- BUF - Peerless Price 40-yard pass from Rob Johnson (pass failed), 1:25. Colts 42-26. Drive: 14 plays, 80 yards, 6:04.

Top passers

- BUF - Rob Johnson - 24/37, 257 yards, TD, INT
- IND - Peyton Manning - 23/29, 421 yards, 4 TD, 2 INT

Top rushers

- BUF - Rob Johnson - 5 rushes, 63 yards
- IND - Edgerrin James - 23 rushes, 111 yards, TD

Top receivers

- BUF - Larry Centers - 7 receptions, 56 yards
- IND - Jerome Pathon - 9 receptions, 168 yards, TD

==== Week 3: at New England Patriots ====
Week 3: Indianapolis Colts at New England Patriots – Game summary

Quarter	1	2	3	4	Total
Colts	0	0	7	6	13
Patriots	7	13	3	21	44

at Foxboro Stadium, Foxborough, Massachusetts

- Date: September 30
- Game time: 1:00 p.m. EDT
- Game weather: Cloudy, 59 °F (15 °C)
- Game attendance: 60,292
- Referee: Bernie Kukar
- TV announcers (CBS): Gus Johnson & Brent Jones

Game information

First quarter

- NE – Antowain Smith 4-yard run (Adam Vinatieri kick), 4:23. Patriots 7–0. Drive: 6 plays, 80 yards, 2:45.

Second quarter

- NE – Adam Vinatieri 47-yard field goal, 5:50. Patriots 10–0. Drive: 7 plays, 37 yards, 3:11.
- NE – Otis Smith 78-yard interception return (Adam Vinatieri kick), 1:42. Patriots 17–0.
- NE – Adam Vinatieri 48-yard field goal, 0:00. Patriots 20–0. Drive: 4 plays, 23 yards, 0:21.

Third quarter

- NE – Adam Vinatieri 35-yard field goal, 9:37. Patriots 23–0. Drive: 4 plays, −2 yards, 1:22.
- IND – Peyton Manning 10-yard run (Mike Vanderjagt kick), 0:53. Patriots 23–7. Drive: 7 plays, 64 yards, 3:30.

Fourth quarter

- NE – Kevin Faulk 8-yard run (Adam Vinatieri kick), 13:24. Patriots 30–7. Drive: 5 plays, 62 yards, 2:29.
- NE – Ty Law 23-yard interception return (Adam Vinatieri kick), 12:24. Patriots 37–7.
- IND – Marcus Pollard 17-yard pass from Peyton Manning (pass failed), 8:51. Patriots 37–13. Drive: 11 plays, 54 yards, 3:33.
- NE – Antowain Smith 2-yard run (Adam Vinatieri kick), 3:39. Patriots 44–13. Drive: 8 plays, 52 yards, 5:12.

Top passers

- IND – Peyton Manning – 20/34, 196 yards, TD, 3 INT
- NE – Tom Brady – 13/23, 168 yards

Top rushers

- IND – Edgerrin James – 17 rushes, 55 yards
- NE – Antowain Smith – 22 rushes, 94 yards, 2 TD

Top receivers

- IND – Marcus Pollard – 4 receptions, 63 yards, TD
- NE – Antowain Smith – 3 receptions, 58 yards

== Season summary ==
The Colts suffered the second losing season of Peyton Manning's career. After opening with great wins over the Jets and Buffalo, the Colts were crushed twice in three games by the Patriots with a loss to Oakland in between. Two more wins followed to bring the Colts to 4–3, but they followed this up with two more losses heading into their matchup with the San Francisco 49ers at home on November 25. The 49ers entered the game having only lost twice to that point in the season, but had struggled to put up points and had barely beaten the Carolina Panthers, who would only record one win that season, the week before.

The Colts, needing the victory, instead turned the ball over five times. Manning threw four interceptions, two to Ahmed Plummer and two more to Zack Bronson including one that was returned for a touchdown. The 49ers scored 23 total points off of the five Indianapolis turnovers. Despite outgaining the 49ers, the Colts lost the game 40–21 and after the game, head coach Jim Mora sharply criticized his offense's effort, especially Manning's four interceptions.

During the press conference, a reporter asked Mora a question about the Colts' playoff chances now that the team was 4–6. Mora, who had not heard what was said, asked him to repeat the question. When the question was repeated, Mora responded by dismissing the suggestion that the Colts could make the postseason in the following manner:

What's that? Ah, *garbled*, playoffs?! Don't talk about — playoffs?! You kidding me?! Playoffs?! I just hope we can win a game! Another game!

A few days later, Manning spoke to reporters ahead of the Colts' next game with the defending Super Bowl champion Baltimore Ravens and sharply criticized Mora's handling of the situation. He said that he did not appreciate being called out in public like he had been and that if Mora had a problem with him he should have spoken to him directly. This caused Mora to backtrack on his previous statements, but the damage was done.

The Colts went on to finish 6–10 and Mora was fired after the season for refusing to fire then defensive coordinator Vic Fangio. Mora felt the team needed better players on defense rather than fire Fangio as Mora could not fire a friend. Vic Fangio was fired anyway, and eventually became the defensive coordinator for the expansion Houston Texans the following year.

Manning threw 23 interceptions during the season, the highest number of his career following his rookie season. He was sacked a career-high 29 times.

== See also ==
- Colts–Patriots rivalry
- History of the Indianapolis Colts
- Indianapolis Colts seasons
