= Nate Hobgood-Chittick =

American football player (1974–2017)

No. 95, 94, 76
- Position: Defensive tackle

Personal information
- Born: November 30, 1974; New Haven, Connecticut, U.S.
- Died: November 11, 2017 (aged 42); Sherman Oaks, California, U.S.
- Listed height: 6 ft 3 in (1.91 m)
- Listed weight: 290 lb (132 kg)

Career information
- High school: William Allen (Allentown, Pennsylvania)
- College: North Carolina
- NFL draft: 1998: undrafted

Career history
- New York Giants (1998); Indianapolis Colts (1998); St. Louis Rams (1999–2000); San Francisco 49ers (2000); Kansas City Chiefs (2001); St.Louis Rams (2002)*; Kansas City Chiefs (2002); Arizona Cardinals (2004)*
- * Offseason or practice squad member only

Awards and highlights
- Super Bowl champion (XXXIV)

Career NFL statistics
- Total tackles: 34
- Sacks: 1.5
- Fumble recoveries: 1
- Stats at Pro Football Reference

Nate Broe Hobgood-Chittick (November 30, 1974 – November 11, 2017) was an American professional football player who was a defensive tackle for four seasons in the National Football League (NFL). He played college football for the North Carolina Tar Heels and was signed as an undrafted free agent by the New York Giants, and spent time with the Indianapolis Colts, St. Louis Rams, San Francisco 49ers, and Kansas City Chiefs.

== Early life and education ==
Hobgood-Chittick was born in New Haven, Connecticut, on November 30, 1974. He attended William Allen High School in Allentown, Pennsylvania, and played college football at the University of North Carolina at Chapel Hill, where he received a full collegiate football scholarship.

At North Carolina, Hobgood-Chittick was roommates with teammate Jeff Saturday, and later recalled that "Jeff kicked our asses all over the practice field. I could count on one hand the number of times I beat him in a one-on-one drill, and if it happened, I celebrated."

== Professional career ==
Hobgood-Chittick later brought Saturday to the attention of the Indianapolis Colts during the 1998 season, telling Sports Illustrated in 2012:

I had no footing at all with that franchise, so I stood outside Bill Polian's door in my dirty sweats, saying a prayer. I walked in and said, 'There's a guy selling electrical supplies in Raleigh right now who whipped all those first-round draft choices at North Carolina every day.' Polian looked at me and said, 'I love it. Let's get him in here for a workout.'

Saturday went on to be selected to six Pro Bowls over his NFL career, and win Super Bowl XLI with the Indianapolis Colts. Hobgood-Chittick also was a member of the St. Louis Rams team that won Super Bowl XXXIV over the Tennessee Titans.

== Personal life ==
Upon retiring, Hobgood-Chittick earned his master's degree in social work from California State University, Long Beach, and became a financial advisor.

On November 11, 2017, at age 42, Hobgood-Chittick died of a heart attack in Sherman Oaks, California.
