= Jeff Saturday =

American football player and sports analyst (born 1975)

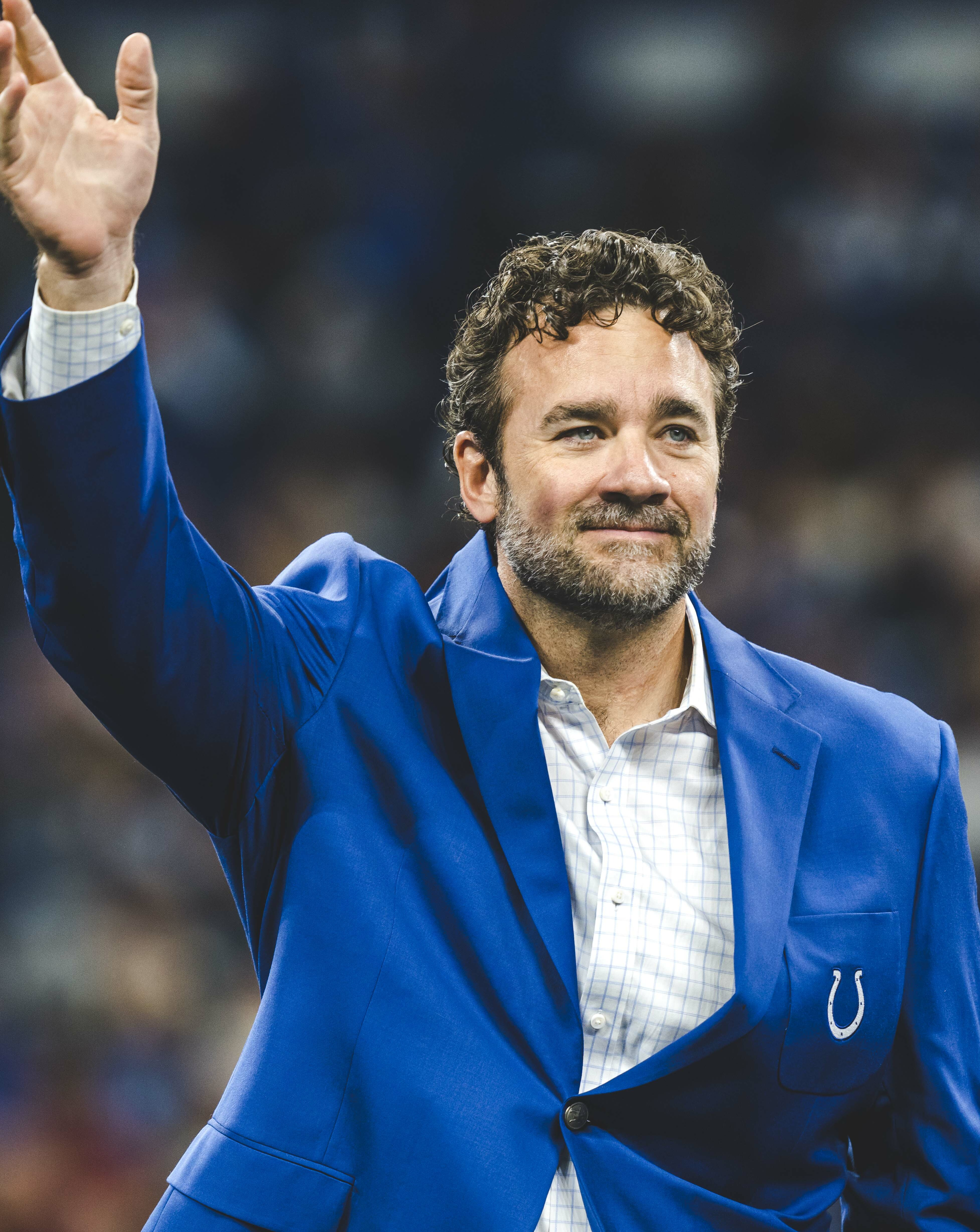
- Saturday in 2022

No. 63
- Position: Center

Personal information
- Born: June 18, 1975 (age 51); Atlanta, Georgia, U.S.
- Listed height: 6 ft 2 in (1.88 m)
- Listed weight: 295 lb (134 kg)

Career information
- High school: Shamrock (Decatur, Georgia)
- College: North Carolina (1993–1997)
- NFL draft: 1998: undrafted

Career history

Playing
- Baltimore Ravens (1998)*; Indianapolis Colts (1999–2011); Green Bay Packers (2012)
- * Offseason or practice squad member only

Coaching
- Hebron Christian Academy (GA) (2017–2020) Head coach; Indianapolis Colts (2022) Interim head coach

Awards and highlights
- Super Bowl champion (XLI); 2× First-team All-Pro (2005, 2007); 2× Second-team All-Pro (2006, 2009); 6× Pro Bowl (2005–2007, 2009, 2010, 2012); NFL Alumni Offensive Lineman of the Year (2007); Indianapolis Colts Ring of Honor (2015); 2× First-team All-ACC (1996, 1997)

Career NFL statistics
- Games played: 211
- Games started: 202
- Fumble recoveries: 11
- Stats at Pro Football Reference

Head coaching record
- Regular season: NFL: 1–7 (.125)
- Postseason: –
- Career: 1–7 (.125)
- Coaching profile at Pro Football Reference

Jeffrey Bryant Saturday (born June 18, 1975) is an American former professional football center and coach in the National Football League (NFL). He played as a center in the NFL, primarily with the Indianapolis Colts. He was a six-time Pro Bowl selection, and won a Super Bowl with the Colts.

Saturday played college football for the North Carolina Tar Heels and was signed by the Baltimore Ravens as an undrafted free agent in 1998, but was cut by the team without playing a game. Saturday then signed with Indianapolis, with whom he played 13 seasons, won Super Bowl XLI over the Chicago Bears and was selected to four All-Pro teams and five Pro Bowls. In his final NFL season, he made his sixth Pro Bowl as a member of the Green Bay Packers. Saturday is currently a sports analyst for ESPN. He was the interim head coach for the Colts for the final eight weeks of the Colts' 2022 season following the firing of Frank Reich.

== Early life ==
Saturday was born in Atlanta, Georgia. He attended Shamrock High School in Decatur, Georgia, in 1993.

His high school coach Ron Gartrell said in a 2012 Sports Illustrated story on Saturday, "Eighty percent of our offense was behind Jeff. On defense we put Jeff on one side and all our other good players on the other side, because teams ran away from Jeff." However, Gartrell could not sell Southeastern Conference schools on Saturday's abilities; in the same interview, he said that coaches at Georgia and Tennessee considered Saturday too short to play in the conference. He received a scholarship offer from the University of North Carolina partly because of Gartrell's friendship with UNC's then-defensive coordinator Carl Torbush.

== College career ==
Saturday received an athletic scholarship to attend the University of North Carolina at Chapel Hill, where he was a four-year letterman for coach Mack Brown's North Carolina Tar Heels football team from 1994 to 1997. As a junior in 1996 and again as a senior in 1997, he was one of the Tar Heels' team captains. He was recognized as a first-team All-Atlantic Coast Conference (ACC) selection at center in 1996 and 1997, and an Academic All-ACC selection in 1997.

== Professional career ==
Pre-draft measurables
Height	Weight	Arm length	Hand span	40-yard dash	10-yard split	20-yard split	20-yard shuttle	Three-cone drill	Vertical jump	Broad jump	Bench press
6 ft 2 3/8 in (1.89 m)	292 lb (132 kg)	31 1/2 in (0.80 m)	10 1/8 in (0.26 m)	5.24 s	1.81 s	3.03 s	4.85 s	8.52 s	25.0 in (0.64 m)	8 ft 4 in (2.54 m)	25 reps
All values from NFL Combine

=== Baltimore Ravens ===
According to Sports Illustrated, Saturday was ranked as the No. 11 center available in the 1998 NFL draft. He was described as "somewhat an overachiever, has worked to make himself better," but also as "an undersized guy [who] simply has trouble matching up against power NTs that can overwhelm him". He went undrafted. The Baltimore Ravens signed him as a free agent on April 27, 1998, only to waive him on June 12, 1998. He then returned to Raleigh, North Carolina, and took a job as a manager at an electrical supply store.

=== Indianapolis Colts ===
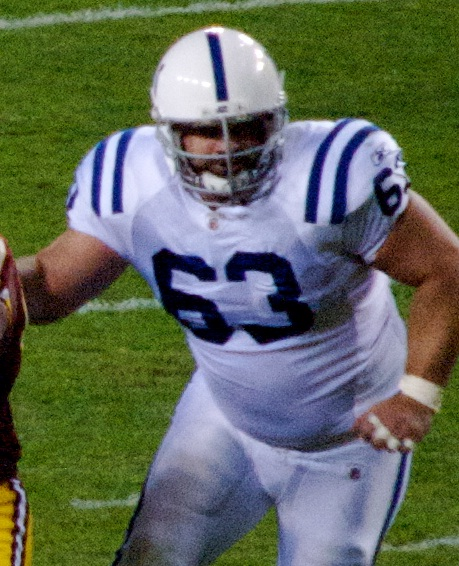
Saturday in 2010

Saturday first came to the attention of the Indianapolis Colts during the 1998 season, when former college teammate Nate Hobgood-Chittick was on the roster. As Hobgood-Chittick would recall in 2012,

I had no footing at all with that franchise, so I stood outside [Bill] Polian's door in my dirty sweats, saying a prayer. I walked in and said, "There's a guy selling electrical supplies in Raleigh right now who whipped all those first-round draft choices at North Carolina every day." Polian looked at me and said, "I love it. Let's get him in here for a workout."

The Colts signed him as a free agent on January 7, 1999. In his rookie season, Saturday backed up starting guard Steve McKinney, and earned his first NFL start at left guard on November 21, 1999, against the Philadelphia Eagles. After only two regular season starts in 1999, Saturday started all 16 regular season games of the 2000 season at center for the Colts, and continued to start every game thereafter—for a total of 85 consecutive games—before sitting out two games with an injury in December 2004. Saturday finished his time with the Colts as the team's starting center for 12 straight seasons, and was the anchor of the Colts' offensive line, which gave up the fewest quarterback sacks among all NFL teams in the 2004, 2005, and 2006 seasons. Saturday attempted a pass once, during a game in 2004, but it fell incomplete.

Though the Colts won at least 10 regular season games for five consecutive years under head coach Tony Dungy, the team could not get to the Super Bowl, losing in the AFC playoffs from 2002 to 2005. In 2006, the Colts went 12–4 in the regular season and earned the third seed in the AFC. On January 21, 2007, Saturday helped the Colts win the AFC Championship Game against the New England Patriots when he recovered a teammate's fumble in the end zone and scored a touchdown. Saturday also provided the key block on the game-winning touchdown run by Joseph Addai, pancaking Vince Wilfork. Peyton Manning, the Colts' quarterback at the time and a longtime friend, claimed that Saturday wants this play to be known as "The Block." Two weeks later, Saturday helped the Colts win Super Bowl XLI against the Chicago Bears.

On February 26, 2009, Saturday signed a three-year $13.3 million contract with the Colts including a $7.45 million signing bonus. He was ranked 59th by his fellow players on the NFL Top 100 Players of 2011.

During his time with the Colts, Saturday started 188 of 197 games. He became a free agent after the 2011 season.

=== Green Bay Packers ===
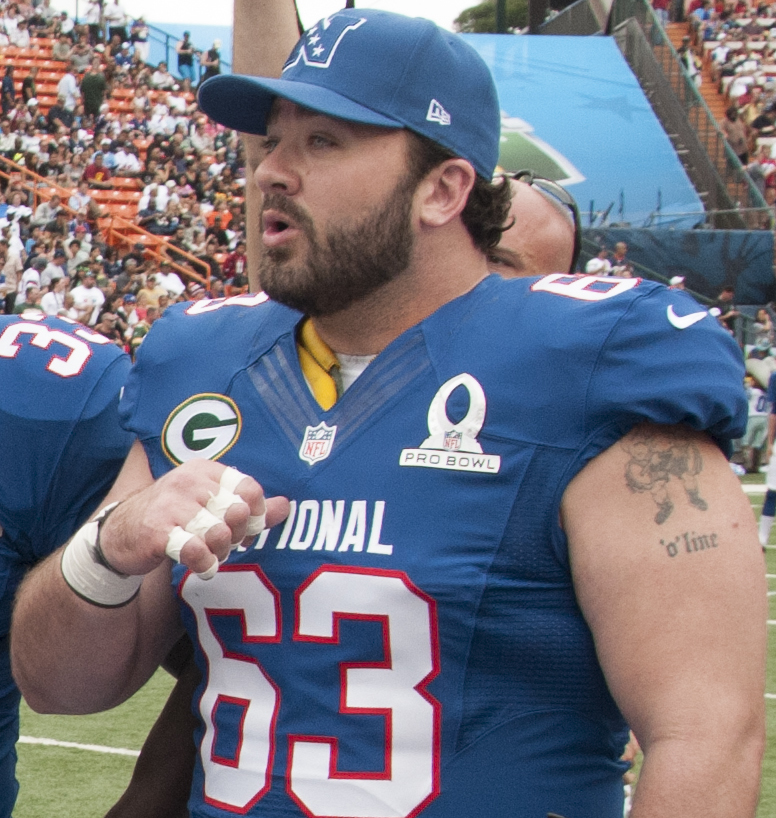
Saturday at the 2013 Pro Bowl

Saturday signed a two-year deal with the Green Bay Packers for $7.75 million on March 23, 2012. After an up-and-down season, Saturday was benched on December 21, 2012. Despite this, Saturday was later announced as the back-up center for the NFC in the 2013 Pro Bowl. In the Pro Bowl, despite being on opposite teams, Saturday and long-time Colts teammate Peyton Manning shared a final snap.

=== Retirement ===
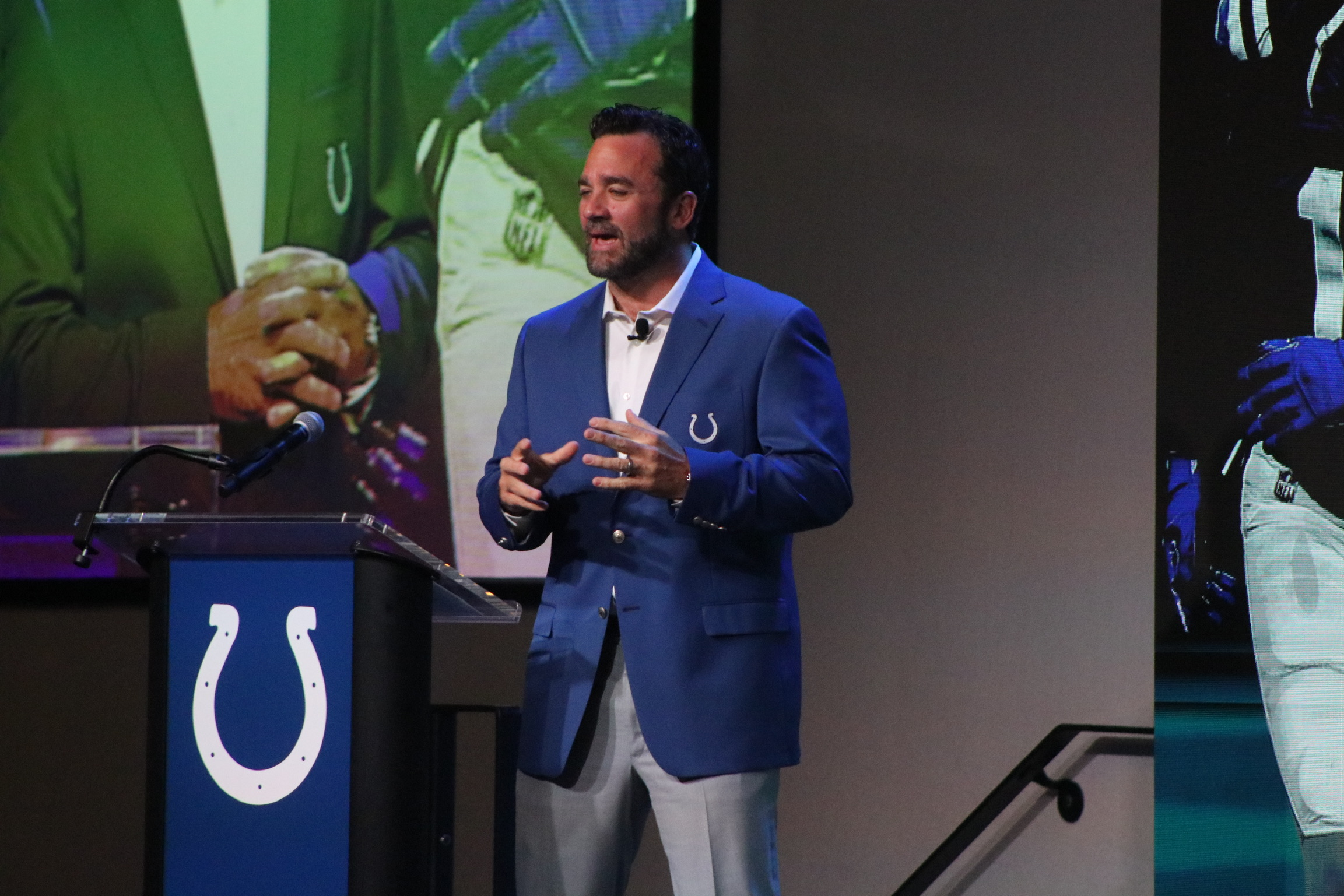
Saturday hosting an Indianapolis Colts fan event in May 2019.

On January 25, 2013, Saturday announced he would retire following the 2013 Pro Bowl Game. On March 7, 2013, Saturday signed a 1-day contract with the Colts to retire with the team with which he spent 13 of his 14 seasons.

=== Honors and awards ===
Saturday was voted onto six Pro Bowl teams in 2005, 2006, 2007, 2009, 2010, and 2012. For the 2005 and 2007 seasons, he was named to the Associated Press NFL All-Pro First-team. He was selected as Offensive Lineman of the Year by the National Football League Alumni organization for 2007.

Saturday was inducted into the Indianapolis Colts Ring of Honor during the week 2 game against the New York Jets on September 21, 2015.

Saturday was inducted into the Georgia Sports Hall of Fame, in Macon, Georgia, as a member of the 2017 class.

== NFL career statistics ==
Year	Team	Games	Starts
1999	IND	11	2
2000	IND	16	16
2001	IND	16	16
2002	IND	16	16
2003	IND	16	16
2004	IND	14	14
2005	IND	16	16
2006	IND	16	16
2007	IND	16	16
2008	IND	12	12
2009	IND	16	16
2010	IND	16	16
2011	IND	16	16
2012	GB	14	14
Career		211	202

== Coaching career ==
=== Hebron Christian Academy ===
On January 20, 2017, Saturday was named the head coach of Hebron Christian Academy, in Dacula, Georgia.

On February 14, 2020, Saturday resigned from the position of head coach at Hebron Christian. During his time there, he went 20–16 while making the playoffs every year, winning three playoff games (including one state quarterfinals appearance in 2019).

=== Indianapolis Colts ===
On November 7, 2022, the Indianapolis Colts named Saturday as the team's interim head coach after the team fired Frank Reich following a 3–5–1 start. The move generated widespread surprise and criticism, notably from former NFL head coach Bill Cowher, and fellow former offensive lineman Joe Thomas, given Saturday's lack of previous coaching experience beyond the high school level and presence of several former NFL head coaches on the staff. Saturday was the first NFL head coach with no prior college or professional coaching experience since Norm Van Brocklin with the Minnesota Vikings in 1961. Colts owner Jim Irsay defended the move and said that Saturday could potentially remain head coach beyond 2022. General manager Chris Ballard said that the Colts had tried to hire Saturday in 2019 as an offensive line coach and also for a position prior to the 2022 season.

Saturday made his head coaching debut against the Las Vegas Raiders, which the Colts won, 25–20.

On December 17, 2022, Saturday's Colts team lost to the Minnesota Vikings by a final score of 39–36. The Colts blew a 33-point lead, which surpassed the 1992 Houston Oilers for the largest blown lead in NFL history. Coincidentally, Frank Reich, whom Saturday replaced as Colts head coach, was the quarterback who led the comeback victory for the Buffalo Bills over the Oilers.

In February 2023, the Colts hired Shane Steichen as their head coach after keeping Saturday as interim and potential head coach for the 2023 season. Saturday has since returned to ESPN.

== Head coaching record ==
=== NFL ===
Team	Year	Regular season					Postseason			
Team	Year	Won	Lost	Ties	Win %	Finish	Won	Lost	Win %	Result
IND*	2022	1	7	0	.125	3rd in AFC South	—	—	—	—
Total		1	7	0	.125		0	0	.000	

* Interim head coach

=== High school ===
Year	Team	Overall	Conference	Standing	Bowl/playoffs
Hebron Christian Lions () (2017–2020)
2017	Hebron Christian	7–5	5–4	5th	
2018	Hebron Christian	6–6	4–3	2nd	
2019	Hebron Christian	8–5	4–0	1st	
2020	Hebron Christian	3–7	1–4	4th	
Hebron Christian:		24–23	14–11		
Total:		24–23			
National championship Conference title Conference division title or championship game berth

== Personal life ==
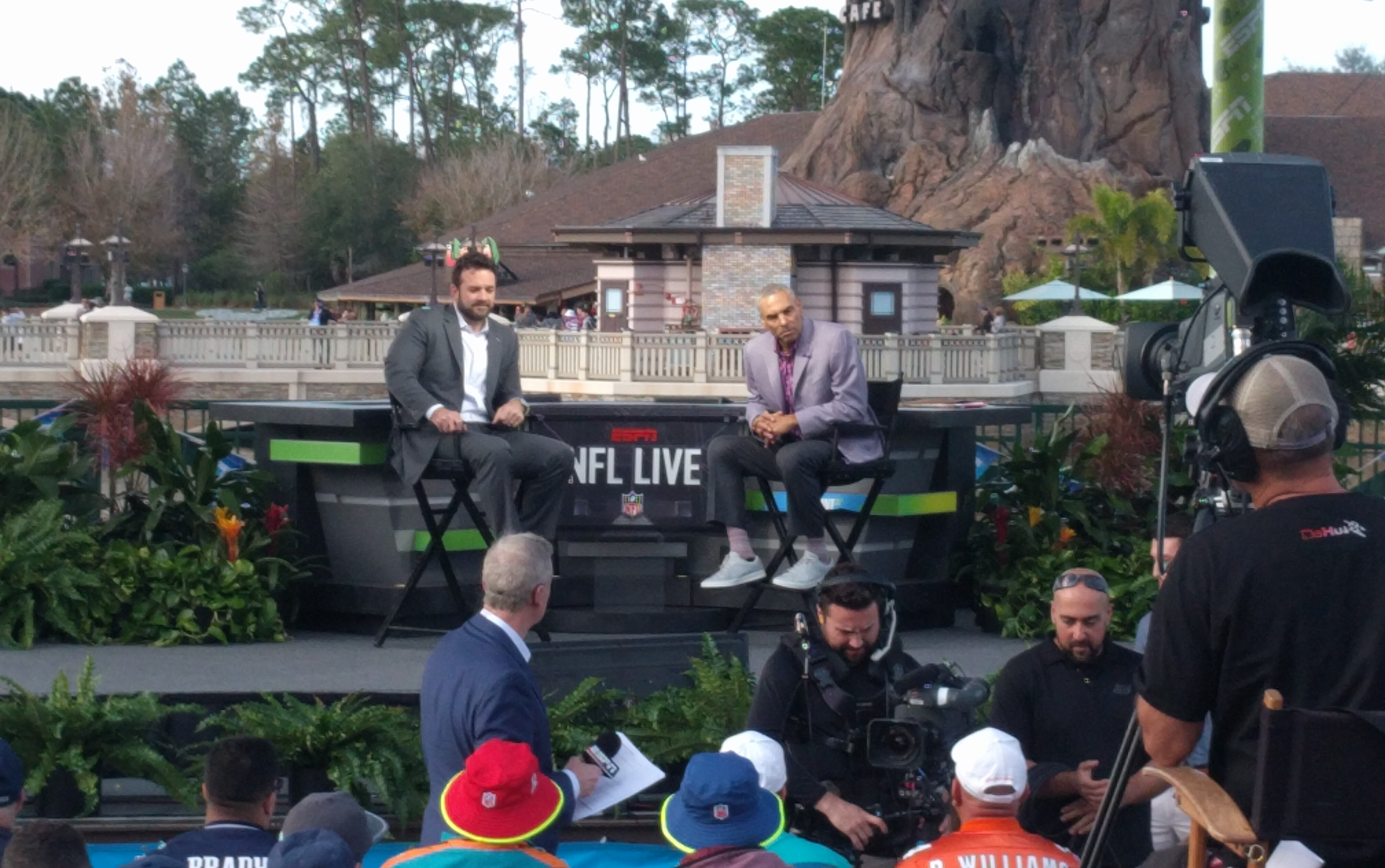
Saturday (left) and Herm Edwards on NFL Live in 2017

Saturday was a member of the executive committee of the National Football League Players' Association, where he was the key negotiator in completing the 2011 Collective Bargaining Agreement (CBA) between the NFL and NFLPA. Saturday joined ESPN in 2013 and has appeared on network programming such as NFL Live and SportsCenter. Following his tenure as the Colts head coach, Saturday rejoined ESPN in 2023.

Saturday's eldest son, Jeffrey, played wide receiver for the North Carolina Tar Heels football team from 2019 to 2022.
