= Reggie Wayne =

American football player and coach (born 1978)

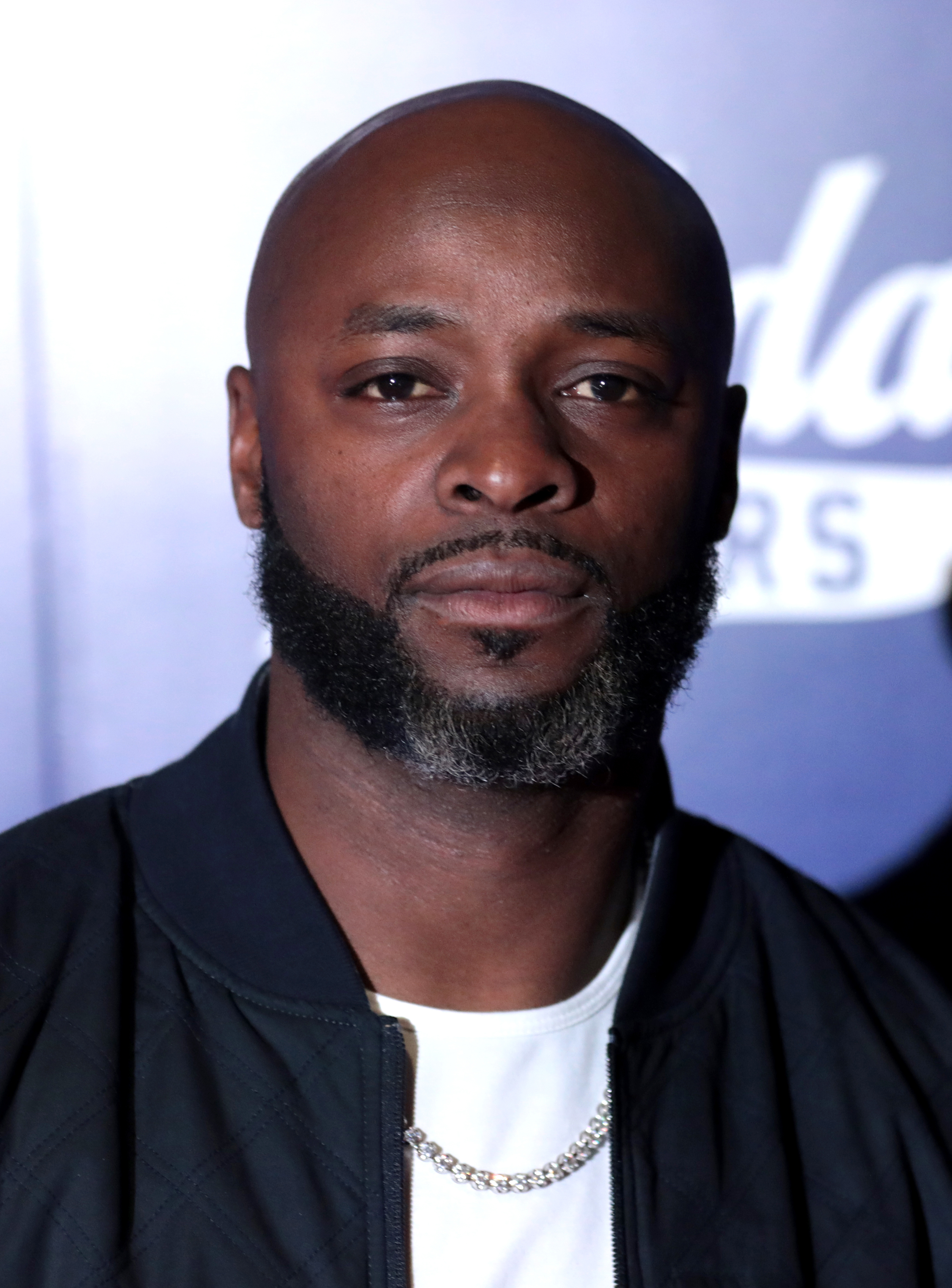
- Wayne in 2023

Indianapolis Colts
- Title: Wide receivers coach

Personal information
- Born: November 17, 1978 (age 48); New Orleans, Louisiana, U.S.
- Listed height: 6 ft 0 in (1.83 m)
- Listed weight: 203 lb (92 kg)

Career information
- Position: Wide receiver (No. 87)
- High school: John Ehret (Marrero, Louisiana)
- College: Miami (FL) (1997–2000)
- NFL draft: 2001: 1st round, 30th overall pick

Career history

Playing
- Indianapolis Colts (2001–2014); New England Patriots (2015)*
- * Offseason or practice squad member only

Coaching
- Indianapolis Colts (2022–present) Wide receivers coach

Awards and highlights
- Super Bowl champion (XLI); First-team All-Pro (2010); 2× Second-team All-Pro (2007, 2009); 6× Pro Bowl (2006–2010, 2012); NFL receiving yards leader (2007); Indianapolis Colts Ring of Honor; Big East Rookie of the Year (1997); Second-team All-Big East (1997)

Career NFL statistics
- Receptions: 1,070
- Receiving yards: 14,345
- Receiving touchdowns: 82
- Stats at Pro Football Reference

Reginald Wayne (born November 17, 1978) is an American professional football coach and a former professional wide receiver who played 14 seasons with the Indianapolis Colts of the National Football League (NFL). He is currently the wide receivers coach for the Colts. He played college football for the Miami Hurricanes, and was selected by the Colts in the first round of the 2001 NFL draft with the 30th overall pick. A six-time Pro Bowl selection, Wayne was a member of the Colts' Super Bowl XLI winning team. He ranks second in Colts' franchise history to Marvin Harrison in major receiving categories: receptions, receiving yards, targets, and receiving touchdowns. On December 14, 2014, Wayne played in both his 209th game and his 142nd win as a member of the Colts, breaking the franchise records set by Peyton Manning.

== Early life ==
Wayne is the youngest of three sons. His father, Ralph, is a former linebacker for Grambling State. A New Orleans Saints fan in his youth, he was more interested in baseball growing up but chose football by the time he attended John Ehret High School.

== College career ==
Wayne attended the University of Miami, where he was a four-year starter for the Hurricanes. He set a school record of 173 career catches (including 36 consecutive games with a reception). He is one of only five wide receivers in school history to post 20 or more touchdowns in his career, along with Michael Irvin, Lamar Thomas, Leonard Hankerson, and Andre Johnson. Wayne's 48 receptions during the 1997 season set a school record for freshmen, which still stands today. Wayne also ran track and field at the University of Miami, where he recorded a personal best of 21.87 seconds in the 200 meters. Wayne graduated with a degree in liberal arts; his roommate was future Baltimore Ravens safety Ed Reed. Wayne was also teammates with future Indianapolis Colts teammate Edgerrin James while at 'The U'.

Wayne was inducted into the University of Miami Sports Hall of Fame at their 43rd Annual Induction Banquet held on March 24, 2011.

== Professional career ==
Pre-draft measurables
Height	Weight	Arm length	Hand span	40-yard dash	Vertical jump
6 ft 0 in (1.83 m)	198 lb (90 kg)	32 in (0.81 m)	9 in (0.23 m)	4.45 s	36.0 in (0.91 m)
All values from NFL Combine

=== Indianapolis Colts ===
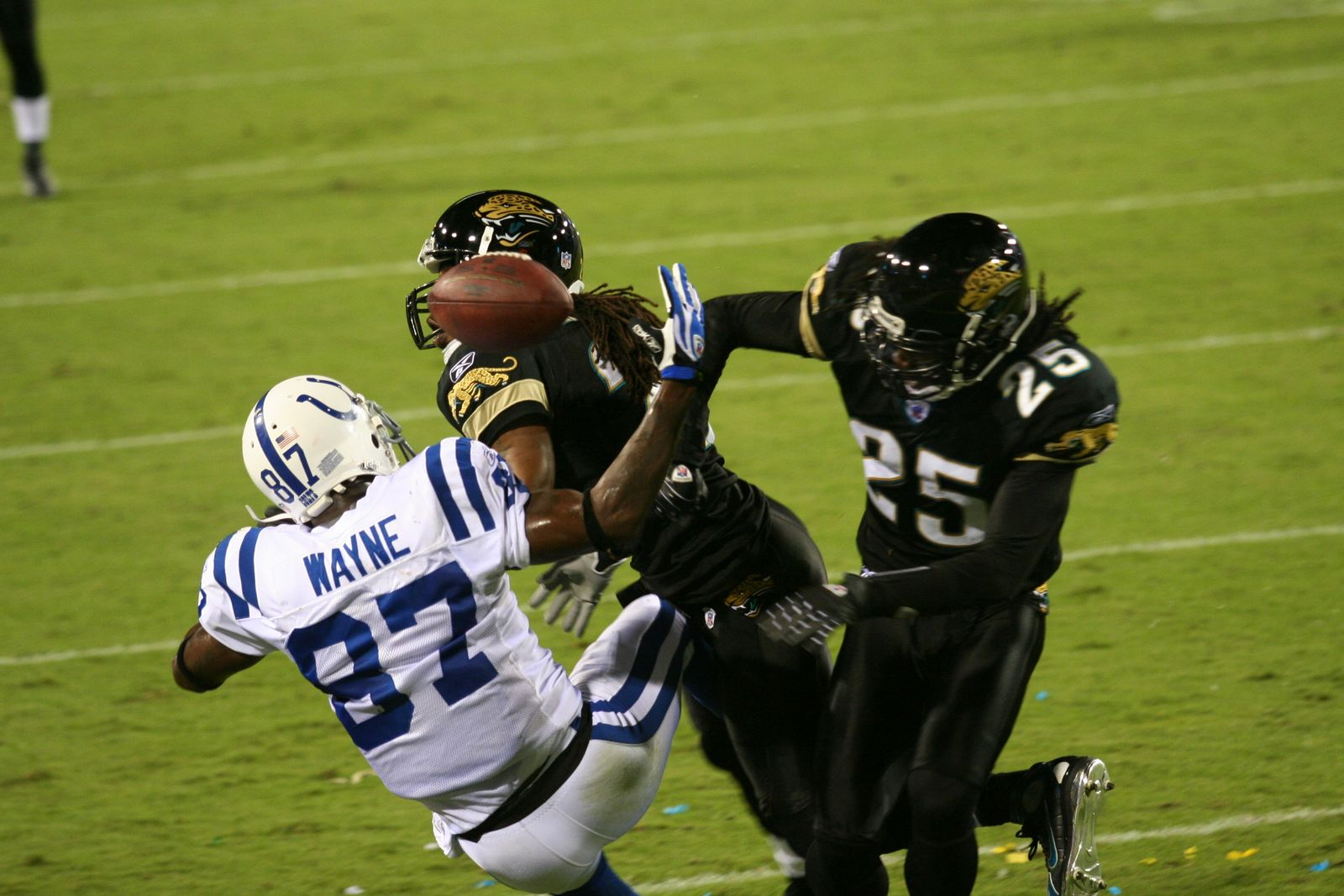
Wayne fights for the ball in a game against the Jacksonville Jaguars, 2007

==== 2001 ====
Wayne was selected by the Indianapolis Colts as the 30th selection in the 2001 NFL draft, the sixth of 34 wide receivers taken in a draft class that included eight future pro-bowlers at the position. He was expected to eventually complement the Colts' other star receiver, Marvin Harrison. He played all 211 games of his career for the Colts.

Wayne made his NFL debut in Week 2 against the Buffalo Bills. He made his first NFL reception in Week 4 against the Oakland Raiders. As a rookie, Wayne caught 27 passes for 345 receiving yards. He only made nine starts and missed three games altogether due to a high ankle sprain.

==== 2002 ====
In Week 3, against the Houston Texans, Wayne scored his first NFL touchdown on a 43-yard reception from Peyton Manning. In Week 10, against the Philadelphia Eagles, he had six receptions for 121 yards and a touchdown in the 35–13 victory, his first game going over the 100-yard mark. In Week 14 against the Tennessee Titans, he had five receptions for 103 yards. In Week 16 against the New York Giants, he had six receptions for 104 yards and two touchdowns. In his second NFL season, Wayne caught 49 passes for 716 yards and four touchdowns in 16 games and seven starts.

==== 2003 ====
In Week 3 of the 2003 season against the Jacksonville Jaguars, Wayne had ten receptions for 141 yards and two touchdowns in the 23–13 victory. In Week 8, in a 30–21 victory over the Houston Texans, he had two receiving touchdowns. In Week 11, against the New York Jets, he had nine receptions for 141 yards in the 38–31 victory. In the 2003 season, Wayne caught 68 balls for 838 yards and seven touchdowns.

Wayne recorded a receiving touchdown in both of the Colts' playoff victories in the Wild Card Round against the Denver Broncos and the Divisional Round against the Kansas City Chiefs.

==== 2004 ====
In Week 2 of the 2004 season, Wayne had seven receptions for 119 yards and a touchdown in the 31–17 victory over the Tennessee Titans. In Week 3, he had 11 receptions for 184 receiving yards and a touchdown in a 45–31 win over the Green Bay Packers. In Week 8, against the Kansas City Chiefs, he had six receptions for 119 receiving yards and two touchdowns. In Week 11 against the Chicago Bears, he had six receptions for 106 yards and a touchdown in the 41–10 victory. In the 2004 season, Wayne caught 77 passes for 1,210 yards and 12 touchdowns during a season in which Colts quarterback Peyton Manning threw a then-record 49 touchdowns. Wayne had ten receptions for 221 yards and two touchdowns in the Wild Card Round, the third-most receiving yards in a postseason game at the time as the Colts beat the Denver Broncos 49–24.

==== 2005 ====
In Week 9 of the 2005 season, Wayne had nine receptions for 124 receiving yards and one receiving touchdown in the 40–21 victory over the New England Patriots. In Week 11, he had five receptions for 117 yards and one touchdown in the 45–37 victory over the Cincinnati Bengals. In Week 17, against the Arizona Cardinals, the 13–2 Colts rested most of their top players in preparation for the playoffs, and Wayne had zero receptions for the last time in his remaining 134 regular season games. In 2005, Wayne had 83 receptions for 1,055 receiving yards and five receiving touchdowns.

In the playoffs, Wayne had 97 yards, a two-point conversion, and a critical 22-yard reception to set up a potential game-tying field goal in a 21–18 loss to the eventual Super Bowl champion Pittsburgh Steelers in the Divisional Round.

==== 2006 ====
In 2006, Wayne signed a six-year, $39.5 million contract. In Week 2, Wayne had six receptions for 135 receiving yards in the 43–24 win over the Houston Texans. In Week 7 against Washington, he had seven receptions for 122 yards and a touchdown in the 36–22 victory. He had ten receptions for 138 yards and three touchdowns in Week 8 against the Denver Broncos. In Week 11, against the Dallas Cowboys, he had seven receptions for 111 yards and a touchdown. In Week 14 against the Jacksonville Jaguars, he had eight receptions for 110 yards. He recorded 86 receptions for 1,310 receiving yards and nine touchdowns. As a result, Wayne was selected to his first Pro Bowl.

In the postseason, Wayne had five receptions in each of the first three games. In the Wild Card Round against the Kansas City Chiefs, Wayne had a receiving touchdown in the 23–8 victory. In the Divisional Round against the Baltimore Ravens, he had five receptions for 51 yards in the 15–6 victory where all of the Colts' points came from field goals. In the AFC Championship against the New England Patriots, he had five receptions for 68 yards in the 38–34 victory, the Colts first over New England in the postseason. He helped the Colts defeat the Chicago Bears in Super Bowl XLI with a 53-yard touchdown reception in the first quarter.

==== 2007 ====
Wayne started off the 2007 season with seven receptions for 115 receiving yards and two receiving touchdowns against the New Orleans Saints in a 41–10 victory in Week 1. In Week 7 against the Jacksonville Jaguars, he had nine receptions for 131 receiving yards in the 29–7 victory. In Week 8, he recorded seven receptions for 168 yards with a touchdown in a 31–7 win over the Carolina Panthers. In Week 10 against the San Diego Chargers, he had ten receptions for 140 yards and a touchdown. In Week 13, in the Colts' second divisional game against the Jaguars, he had eight receptions for 158 yards and a touchdown in the 28–25 victory. In Week 16 against the Houston Texans, he had ten receptions for 143 receiving yards and a touchdown in the 38–15 victory. In 2007, Wayne responded to a rash of injuries on the team, including Harrison and tight end Dallas Clark, by setting a then-career-high in receptions (104), and a career-high in yards (1,510). He led the league in receiving yards and was selected to go to the Pro Bowl for the second consecutive year.

In the Divisional Round of the playoffs, Wayne had a receiving touchdown in the 28–24 loss to the San Diego Chargers.

==== 2008 ====
Wayne opened the 2008 season with a receiving touchdown four of the Colts' first five games. In that stretch was an eight-catch, 118-yard, one-touchdown game against the Baltimore Ravens in Week 6, a 31–3 victory. In the 2008 season, Wayne posted a Pro Bowl season for the third consecutive year with 82 catches for 1,145 yards and six touchdowns. He had a 65-yard score on the opening drive of Week 10 against the Pittsburgh Steelers. In the Wild Card Round, he had 129 yards including a 72-yard touchdown, but the Colts lost in overtime, eliminated in the first round by the San Diego Chargers for the second consecutive year.

==== 2009 ====
In the Colts' 2009 season opener against the Jacksonville Jaguars, Wayne had ten receptions for 162 yards and a touchdown in the 14–12 victory. In Week 3, against the Arizona Cardinals, he had seven receptions for 126 receiving yards and a touchdown in the 31–10 victory. In Week 8, against the San Francisco 49ers, he had 12 receptions for 147 yards and a touchdown in the 18–14 victory. In Week 10, he caught the winning touchdown pass with 0:14 left against the New England Patriots in what is now known as the "4th and 2" game. He had ten receptions for 126 yards and two touchdowns in the win over New England. In Week 15, against the Jacksonville Jaguars, he had five receptions for 132 yards and a touchdown in the 35–31 victory. He totaled 100 receptions for 1,264 receiving yards and ten receiving touchdowns on the season. Wayne was also selected as a starter for the Pro Bowl, but could not play due to the Colts playing in the Super Bowl. In Super Bowl XLIV, Wayne had five catches for 46 yards, but the Colts lost 31–17 to the New Orleans Saints.

==== 2010 ====
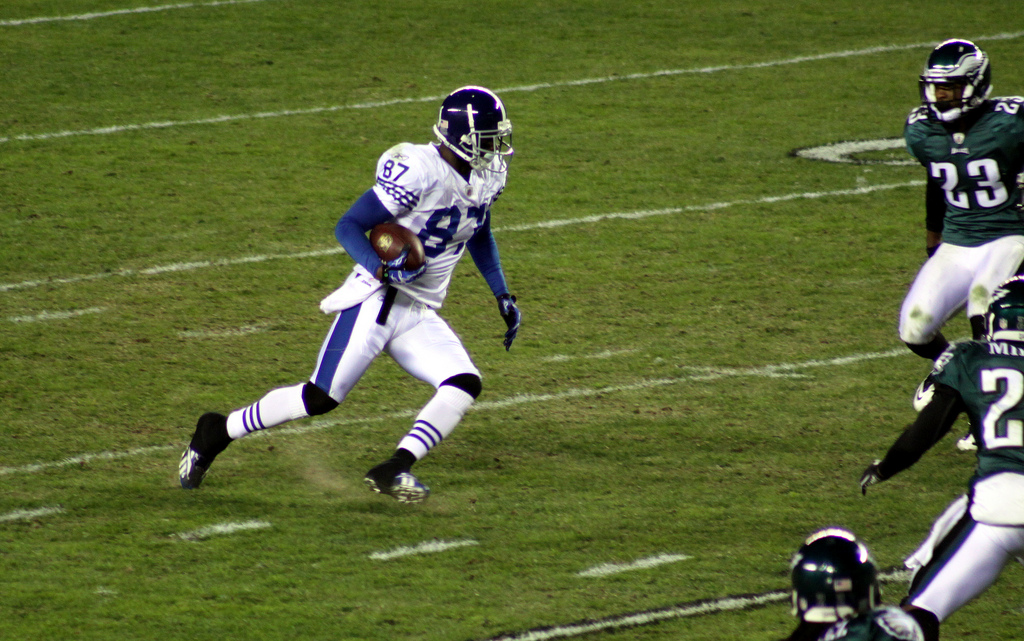
Wayne playing against the Philadelphia Eagles in 2010

In 2010, Wayne was second in the NFL receptions with 111 (a career-high), and third in receiving yards with 1,355. During a season where the Colts heavily relied on Peyton Manning to win games, Wayne again cemented himself as one of the top receivers in the NFL. This included a franchise-record 15 receptions which he converted into 196 yards against Jacksonville in Week 4, and 14 receptions for 200 yards in Week 13 against Dallas. Wayne was selected to his fifth Pro Bowl and earned first team All-Pro honors for the first time. He was ranked 31st by his fellow players on the NFL Top 100 Players of 2011.

==== 2011 ====
Wayne's numbers were lower than usual in 2011 without Peyton Manning starting at quarterback, though he still led team in receptions (75) and receiving yards (960). He had four touchdown receptions as well. He had three games going over the 100-yard mark on the year, including a season-high 122 against the Carolina Panthers in Week 12.

==== 2012 ====
On March 13, 2012, the Colts re-signed Wayne to a three-year contract. Wayne started off the season with nine receptions for 135 yards against the Chicago Bears. Before the Colts' Week 5 matchup with the Green Bay Packers, the news of head coach Chuck Pagano's leukemia surfaced. Wayne's history with Pagano goes back to his college years, where Pagano was the Hurricanes' defensive backs coach, and Pagano's hiring as the Colts' head coach was a large factor in Wayne's decision to re-sign with Indianapolis. In response, Wayne caught 13 passes for a career-high 212 receiving yards and a game-winning touchdown from rookie quarterback Andrew Luck; Wayne earned the AFC Offensive Player of the Week award due to his performance, the first of his career. In Week 12 against Buffalo Bills, Wayne broke Cris Carter's record of consecutive games with three or more receptions with 59 games. He also passed former Washington Redskins receiver Art Monk for 12th on the NFL's all-time receptions list during the first half. In the 2012 season, Wayne had 106 receptions for 1,355 receiving yards and five receiving touchdowns. He was named to his sixth Pro Bowl.

During the Wild Card Round against the Baltimore Ravens, Wayne had 114 yards on nine receptions and moved into second in career playoff catches with 92–59 behind leader Jerry Rice. However, the Colts lost the game, 24–9. He was ranked 21st by his fellow players on the NFL Top 100 Players of 2013.

Wayne was selected as the wide receiver for USA Football's 2012 All-Fundamentals Team, which honors 26 NFL players each year for executing the fundamentals of their position.

==== 2013 ====
In the 2013 season, Wayne recorded five receptions for 100 yards and a touchdown against Jacksonville in Week 4, a 37–3 victory. In a Week 6 loss to San Diego, Wayne became the ninth player to reach 1,000 career receptions. However, a week later, Wayne tore his ACL during a 39–33 victory over Denver, in Peyton Manning's first bout against the Colts since leaving Indianapolis in 2012; it was announced the next day that he would miss the remainder of the 2013 season. The injury also ended his consecutive games played streak at 189, the third-longest for a wide receiver in NFL history.

==== 2014 ====
With the retirement of Tony Gonzalez, 36-year-old Wayne entered 2014 as the active leader in career receiving yards. He gained 98 more on nine receptions in a 31–24 season-opening loss to the Denver Broncos, and 119 on seven receptions in Week 4 against the Tennessee Titans. In Week 8, Wayne became the ninth receiver in NFL history to record 14,000 receiving yards. He suffered an elbow injury in the game and missed the following week's matchup against the Pittsburgh Steelers. Near the conclusion of the Colts' 2014 season, it was announced that Wayne had played with a torn triceps since Week 6, which would require an offseason surgery to repair. He finished the 2014 season with 64 receptions for 779 receiving yards and two receiving touchdowns.

He had just one reception in the Colts' three post-season games, concluding his career with franchise records for postseason receptions (93); receiving yards (1,254), receiving touchdowns (9), and games with 100+ yards receiving (3, shared with Dallas Clark and T. Y. Hilton).

On March 6, 2015, the Colts announced that they would not re-sign Wayne, which made him a free agent on March 10.

=== New England Patriots ===
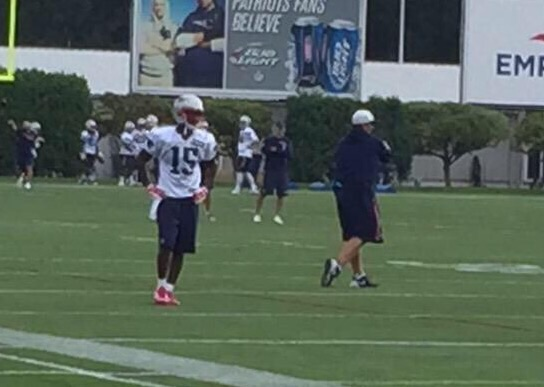
Wayne at practice with the New England Patriots, 2015

On August 24, 2015, Wayne signed a one-year contract with the New England Patriots worth up to $3 million. On September 5, 2015, Wayne requested and was granted his release from the Patriots.

On January 15, 2016, after not playing the entire 2015 season, Wayne announced his retirement from professional football, saying, "It was fun, but it's time. It's just time. Whenever you can admit that you're done, you know you're done." At the time of his retirement, he finished his NFL career 7th all-time in career receptions, 8th all-time in receiving yards, and 17th in career touchdown receptions.

== Career statistics ==
Legend
	Won the Super Bowl
	Led the league
**Bold**	Career high

=== NFL ===
==== Regular season ====
Year	Team	Games		Receiving					Rushing					Fumbles	
Year	Team	GP	GS	Rec	Yds	Avg	Lng	TD	Att	Yds	Avg	Lng	TD	Fum	Lost
2001	IND	13	9	27	345	12.8	43	0	—	—	—	—	—	0	0
2002	IND	16	7	49	716	14.6	49	4	—	—	—	—	—	2	1
2003	IND	16	16	68	838	12.3	57T	7	—	—	—	—	—	0	0
2004	IND	16	16	77	1,210	**15.7**	71T	**12**	**1**	−4	−4.0	−4	0	0	0
2005	IND	16	16	83	1,055	12.7	66T	5	—	—	—	—	—	1	0
2006	IND	16	16	86	1,310	15.2	51T	9	—	—	—	—	—	1	0
2007	IND	16	16	104	**1,510**	14.5	64	10	**1**	4	4.0	4	0	**3**	**3**
2008	IND	16	16	82	1,145	14.0	65T	6	—	—	—	—	—	0	0
2009	IND	16	16	100	1,264	12.6	65T	10	—	—	—	—	—	0	0
2010	IND	16	16	**111**	1,355	12.2	50	6	—	—	—	—	—	1	1
2011	IND	16	16	75	960	12.8	56T	4	—	—	—	—	—	0	0
2012	IND	16	15	106	1,355	12.8	33	5	**1**	−5	−5.0	−5	0	1	1
2013	IND	7	7	38	503	13.2	35	2	**1**	**5**	**5.0**	**5**	0	0	0
2014	IND	15	15	64	779	12.2	**80**	2	—	—	—	—	—	1	1
Career		211	197	1,070	14,345	13.4	80	82	4	0	0.0	5	0	10	7

==== Postseason ====
Year	Team	Games		Receiving					Fumbles	
Year	Team	GP	GS	Rec	Yds	Avg	Lng	TD	Fum	Lost
2002	IND	1	1	3	17	5.7	7	0	0	0
2003	IND	3	3	15	172	11.5	20	**2**	0	0
2004	IND	2	2	13	**256**	19.7	49	**2**	**1**	**1**
2005	IND	1	1	7	97	13.9	24	0	0	0
2006	IND	4	4	**17**	216	12.7	53	**2**	0	0
2007	IND	1	1	7	76	10.9	21	1	0	0
2008	IND	1	1	4	129	**32.2**	**72**	1	0	0
2009	IND	3	3	16	164	10.2	25	1	**1**	0
2010	IND	1	1	1	1	1.0	1	0	0	0
2012	IND	1	1	9	114	12.7	20	0	0	0
2014	IND	3	3	1	12	12.0	12	0	0	0
Career		21	21	93	1,254	13.5	72	9	2	1

=== College ===
Season	Team	Games		Receiving			
Season	Team	GP	GS	Rec	Yds	Avg	TD
1997	Miami	11	10	**48**	640	13.3	2
1998	Miami	9	9	42	629	15.0	4
1999	Miami	12	12	40	486	12.1	4
2000	Miami	11	11	43	**755**	**17.5**	**10**
Total		43	42	173	2,510	14.3	20

== Post-playing career ==
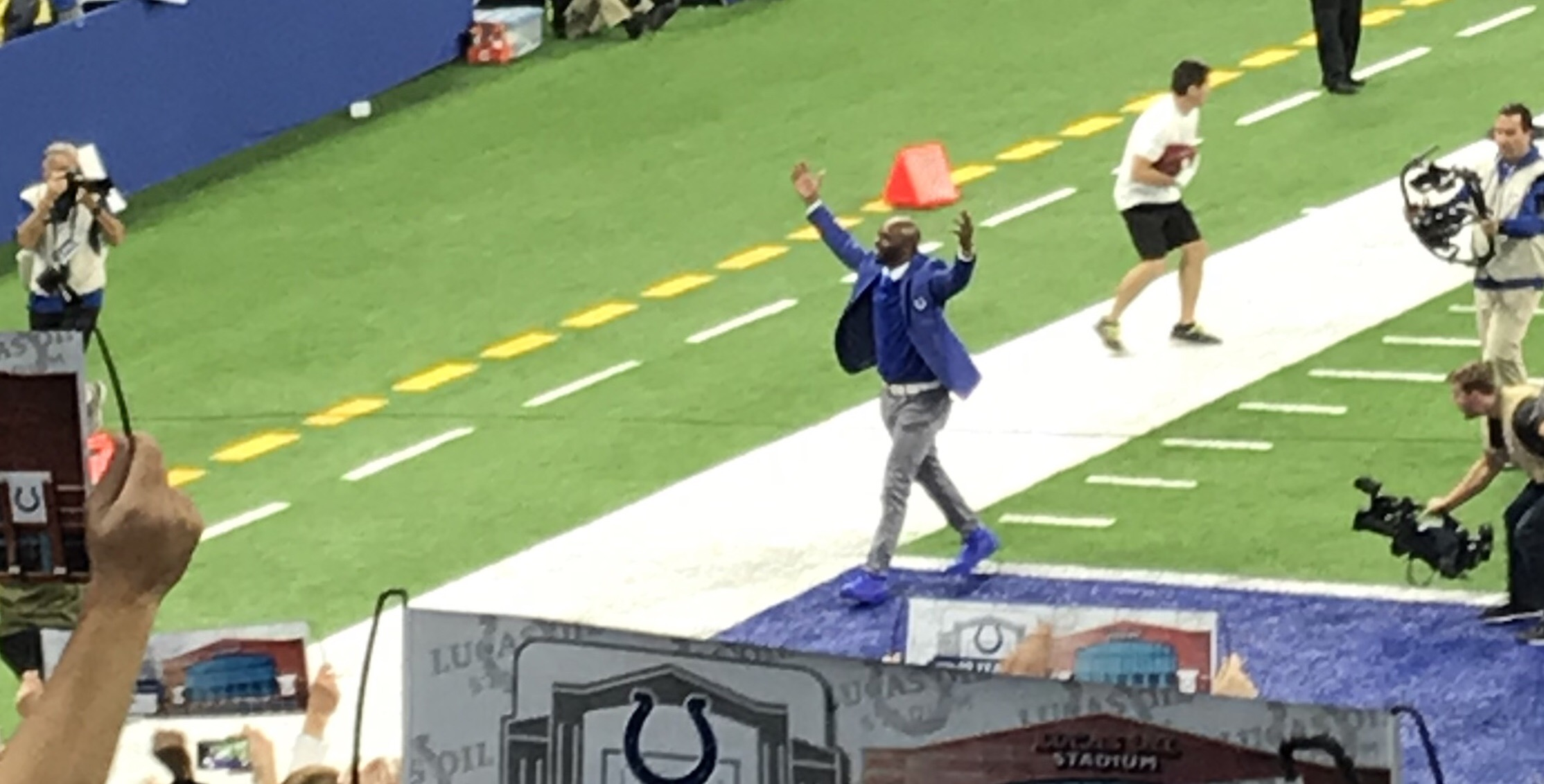
Wayne after being inducted into the Indianapolis Colts' Ring of Honor, November 2018

On November 18, 2018, Wayne became the 15th player to be inducted into the team's Ring of Honor, in a ceremony attended by former teammates including Marvin Harrison, Manning and Saturday. On January 2, 2020, Wayne was named one of 15 modern-era finalists for election into the Pro Football Hall of Fame in Canton, Ohio. He and Pittsburgh Steelers safety Troy Polamalu are the only two finalists for 2020 to be nominated in their first year of eligibility. As of 2021, Wayne has been nominated four times for the Pro Football Hall of Fame, but has not yet been selected.

For the 2021 NFL draft, Wayne joined Bleacher Report as a positional expert. He applauded the Giants' first-round pick of Kadarius Toney. Wayne went on to compare him to Percy Harvin and called him the toughest wide receiver in the draft.

=== Coaching career ===
On April 30, 2018, the Colts announced that Wayne would join the team as a volunteer receivers coach. On March 14, 2022, Wayne was officially hired as the wide receivers coach for the Colts as part of head coach Frank Reich's staff. Following the firing of Reich, it was announced that Wayne would retain his same role in the initial coaching staff of new head coach, Shane Steichen, in February 2023.

== Personal life ==
In 2012, a hotel valet stole his luxury vehicle from an Indianapolis hotel where Wayne left his car. The valet was arrested standing outside the car with a blood alcohol content of .13 percent.
