= Indianapolis Colts Ring of Honor =

Team hall of fame

Coordinates: 39°45′36.2″N 86°9′49.7″W

The Indianapolis Colts Ring of Honor honors former players, coaches, club officials, and fans who made outstanding contributions to the Indianapolis Colts football organization. Originally a ring around the former RCA Dome in Indianapolis, Indiana, it currently encircles Lucas Oil Stadium.

The Ring of Honor began on September 23, 1996, with the induction of then owner, Robert Irsay. Since then, fourteen players (11 offensive, 2 defensive, and 1 special team), two head coaches, two general managers, another owner, and an honor to the fans have been added. Tony Dungy was the first to be added to the ring of honor in Lucas Oil Stadium.

The 12th Man addition to the ring was the last to be added in the RCA Dome. While the ring membership is not increased annually, there was at least one inductee added every season from 2015 to 2019.

== Inductees ==
Pro Football Hall of Fame finalist
Inducted or Enshrined in the Pro Football Hall of Fame

N°	Name	Position	Years With Club	Inducted
—	Robert Irsay	Owner	1972–1997	1996
80	Bill Brooks	WR	1986–1992	1998
75	Chris Hinton	OT, OG	1983–1989	2001
—	Ted Marchibroda	Head coach	1975–1979; 1992–1995	2002
4	Jim Harbaugh	QB	1994–1997	2005
—	12th Man (removed)†	Fans	—	2007
—	Tony Dungy	Head coach	2002–2008	2010
88	Marvin Harrison	WR	1996–2008	2011
32	Edgerrin James	RB	1999–2005	2012
29	Eric Dickerson	RB	1987–1991	2013
28	Marshall Faulk	RB	1994–1998	2013
63	Jeff Saturday	C	1999–2011	2015
—	Bill Polian	President/General Manager	1998–2011	2016
18	Peyton Manning	QB	1998–2011	2017
87	Reggie Wayne	WR	2001–2014	2018
93	Dwight Freeney	DE	2002–2012	2019
98	Robert Mathis	DE	2003–2016	2021
78	Tarik Glenn	OT	1997–2006	2022
44	Dallas Clark	TE	2003–2011	2024
—	Jim Irsay	General Manager/Owner	1972–2025	2025
4	Adam Vinatieri	K	2006–2019	2026

† The Colts removed the 12th Man reference in 2016, retroactively renaming the honor "Colts Nation"
