= Marvin Harrison =

American football player (born 1972)

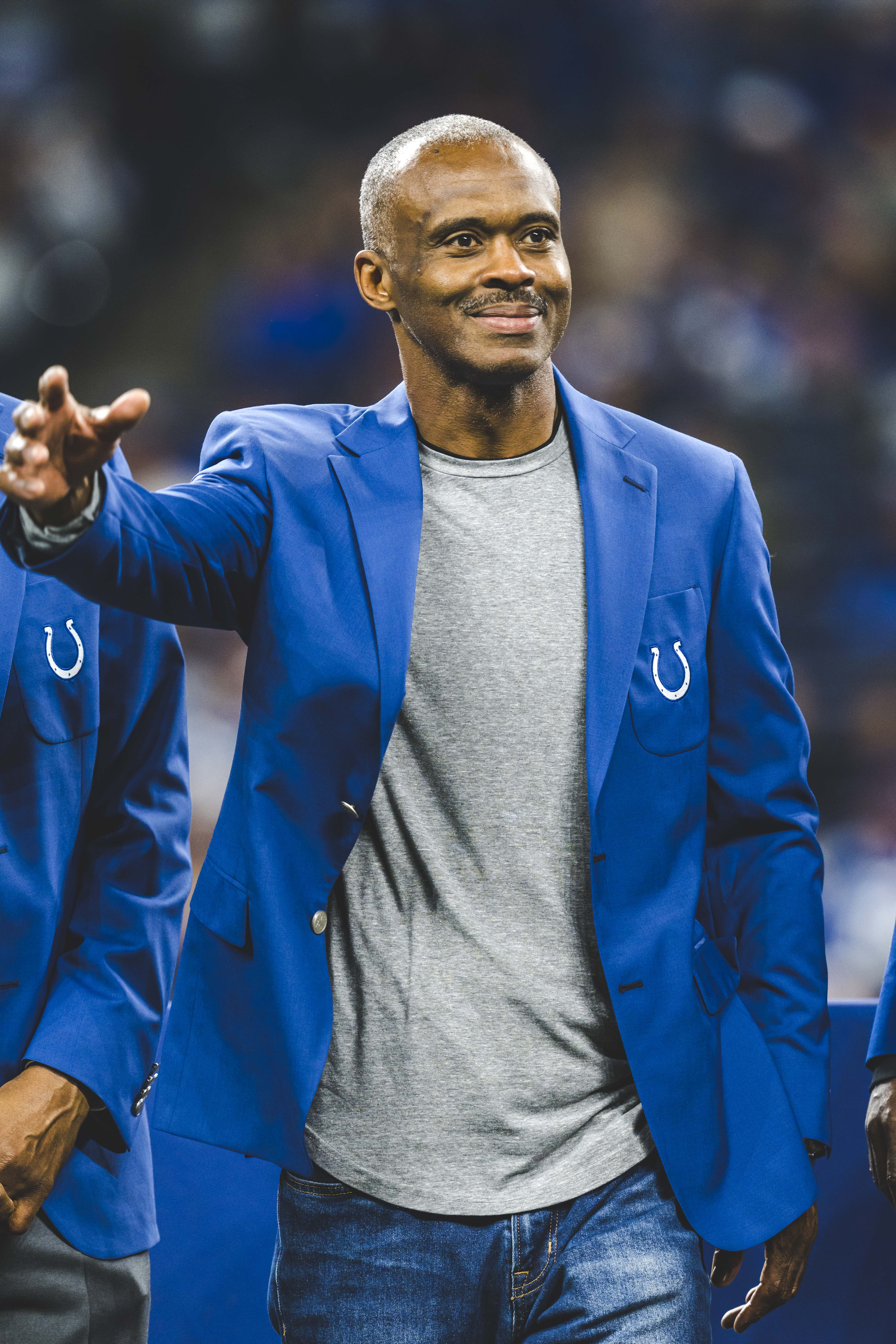
- Harrison in 2022

No. 88
- Position: Wide receiver

Personal information
- Born: August 25, 1972 (age 54); Philadelphia, Pennsylvania, U.S.
- Listed height: 6 ft 0 in (1.83 m)
- Listed weight: 185 lb (84 kg)

Career information
- High school: Roman Catholic (Philadelphia)
- College: Syracuse (1992–1995)
- NFL draft: 1996: 1st round, 19th overall pick

Career history
- Indianapolis Colts (1996–2008)

Awards and highlights
- Super Bowl champion (XLI); 3× First-team All-Pro (1999, 2002, 2006); 5× Second-team All-Pro (2000, 2001, 2003–2005); 8× Pro Bowl (1999–2006); 2× NFL receiving yards leader (1999, 2002); 2× NFL receptions leader (2000, 2002); NFL receiving touchdowns co-leader (2005); NFL 2000s All-Decade Team; NFL 100th Anniversary All-Time Team; Indianapolis Colts Ring of Honor; First-team All-American (1995); Big East Special Teams Player of the Year (1995); 3× All-Big East (1993-1995)

Career NFL statistics
- Receptions: 1,102
- Receiving yards: 14,580
- Receiving touchdowns: 128
- Stats at Pro Football Reference
- Pro Football Hall of Fame
- College Football Hall of Fame

Marvin Darnell Harrison Sr. (born August 25, 1972) is an American former professional football wide receiver who played in the National Football League (NFL) for 13 seasons with the Indianapolis Colts. Harrison played college football for the Syracuse Orange and was selected by the Colts in the first round of the 1996 NFL draft. He is considered one of the greatest wide receivers in NFL history.

An eight-time Pro Bowler and All-Pro member, Harrison held the record for most receptions in a single season (143) until it was broken by Michael Thomas (149) in 2019. Harrison was also a member of the team that won Super Bowl XLI. He was inducted to the Pro Football Hall of Fame in 2016 and the College Football Hall of Fame in 2026.

== Early life ==
Harrison was born in Philadelphia, Pennsylvania. He attended and played high school football at Roman Catholic High School in Philadelphia.

== College career ==
Harrison attended Syracuse University; he was a three-year starter for the football team, playing with quarterback Donovan McNabb in his final year. He was named as a captain for the 1995 season. In a game against West Virginia in the 1995 season, he had a 96-yard touchdown reception from Donovan McNabb. He was the Big East Special Teams Player of the Year in 1995. In the 1996 Gator Bowl, he had seven catches for 173 yards in a 41–0 win over Clemson. Harrison's 1,131 yards were a school record for a single season until Amba Etta-Tawo broke it in 2016. Harrison set a school record with 2,718 career receiving yards, which stood until 2017 when it was broken by Steve Ishmael in the final game of his career. Harrison also returned 42 punts for 542 yards and two touchdowns and ranked second to Rob Moore in school history with 20 receiving touchdowns. He was named All-Big East in 1993, 1994, and 1995. Harrison graduated with a degree in retail management.

On January 14, 2026, Harrison was inducted into the College Football Hall of Fame.

== Professional career ==
Pre-draft measurables
Height	Weight	Arm length	Hand span	Wonderlic
5 ft 11 7/8 in (1.83 m)	181 lb (82 kg)	30 3/4 in (0.78 m)	9 3/4 in (0.25 m)	19
All values from NFL Combine

Harrison was selected by the Indianapolis Colts in the first round as the 19th selection in the 1996 NFL draft, a selection which was obtained in a trade that sent Jeff George to the Atlanta Falcons. Harrison went on to become one of the most productive receivers from that draft class, which included Keyshawn Johnson, Eric Moulds, Bobby Engram, Muhsin Muhammad, Eddie Kennison, Terry Glenn, Amani Toomer, Joe Horn, and Terrell Owens among others.

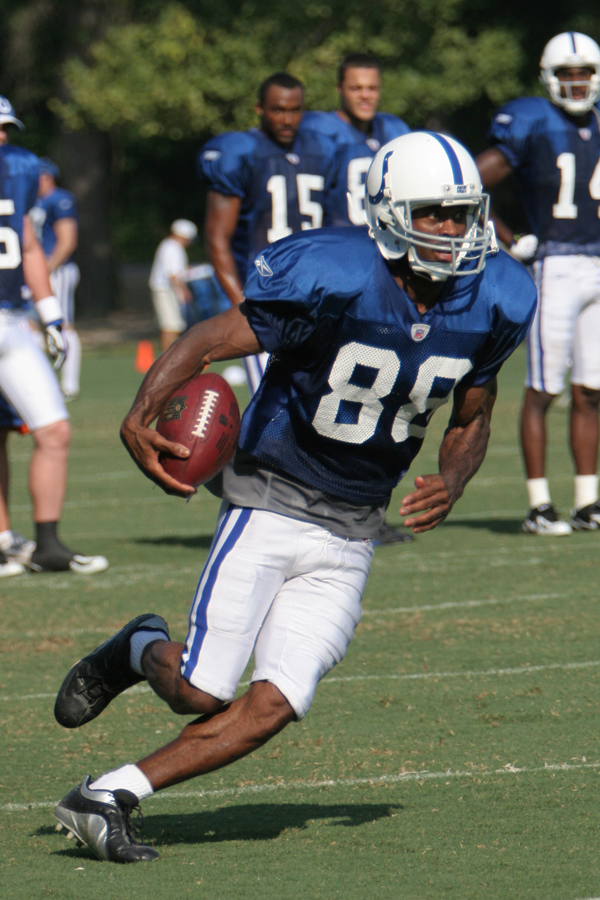
Harrison with the Indianapolis Colts in 2007

=== 1996 ===
Harrison made his NFL debut in Week 1 of the 1996 NFL season against the Arizona Cardinals with six receptions for 85 yards and a touchdown reception from quarterback Jim Harbaugh in the 20–13 victory. In Week 2 against the Jets, he had five punt returns for 102 yards and earned AFC Special Teams Player of the Week for his performance in the 21–7 win. In Week 15 against the Philadelphia Eagles, he had six receptions for 106 yards and touchdown in the 37–10 victory. In the following game, a 24–19 win over the Kansas City Chiefs, he had six receptions for 103 yards and three touchdowns. He was named AFC Offensive Player of the Week for his game against the Chiefs. He finished his rookie season with 64 receptions for 836 receiving yards and eight receiving touchdowns in 16 games and 15 starts as the Colts went 9–7. Among rookie wide receivers, he finished fourth in receiving yards, third in receptions, and tied for second in receiving touchdowns. In his playoff debut, Harrison had three receptions for 71 yards in a 42–14 loss to the Pittsburgh Steelers in the Wild Card Round.

=== 1997 ===
From Week 11 to Week 13, Harrison had a three-game streak of scoring a receiving touchdown. In the 1997 season, Harrison recorded 73 receptions for 866 yards and six touchdowns as the Colts went 3–13.

=== 1998 ===
The 1998 NFL Draft had the arrival of Peyton Manning who became the franchise quarterback for the Colts. During their careers, Manning and Harrison were arguably one of the most productive quarterback-wide receiver duos in NFL history. In the Colts' 1998 regular season opener, Harrison had five receptions for 102 yards and a touchdown in a 24–15 loss to the Miami Dolphins. In Week 7, against the San Francisco 49ers, he had three receiving touchdowns in the 34–31 loss. In Week 11, against the New York Jets, he had nine receptions for 128 yards and a touchdown in the 24–23 victory. Harrison missed the Colts' final four regular season games after going on Injured Reserve. In the 1998 season, he had 59 receptions for 776 yards and seven touchdowns in 12 games and starts as the Colts went 3–13.

=== 1999 ===
In the 1999 season, Harrison had a breakout season. He started off the regular season with eight receptions for 121 yards and two touchdowns in a 31–14 win over the Bills. In the following game, he had seven receptions for 105 yards and three touchdowns in a 31–28 loss to the Patriots. In the following game, he had 13 receptions for 196 yards and a touchdown in the 27–19 win over the Chargers. He was named AFC Offensive Player of the Month for September. In Week 7, against the Bengals, he had eight receptions for 156 yards and a touchdown in the 31–10 victory. From Week 13 to Week 16, he had four consecutive games with over 100 receiving yards (125 against the Dolphins, 118 against the Patriots, 117 against Washington, and 138 against the Browns), all wins for the Colts. He had 115 receptions for 1,663 receiving yards and 12 receiving touchdowns in 16 games and starts as the Colts went 13–3 and won the AFC East. He earned Pro Bowl and first team All-Pro honors.

=== 2000 ===
Harrison started off the 2000 season with nine receptions for 115 yards in a 27–14 win over the Chiefs. In the following game, he had ten receptions for 141 yards and a touchdown in the 38–31 loss to the Raiders. In a Week 6 loss to the Patriots, he had 13 receptions for 159 yards and a touchdown in the 24–16 loss. In the following game, a 37–24 victory over the Seahawks, he had seven receptions for 134 yards. In the following game, a 30–23 victory over the Patriots, he had five receptions for 156 yards and two touchdowns. In the regular season finale against the Vikings, Harrison had 12 receptions for 109 yards and three touchdowns in the 31–10 victory. In the 2000 season, he had a league-leading 102 receptions for 1,413 receiving yards and 14 receiving touchdowns in 16 games and starts as the Colts went 10–6. He was named to his second Pro Bowl for his performance in the 2000 season.

=== 2001 ===
In Week 2 of the 2001 season, Harrison had seven receptions for 146 yards and three touchdowns in the 42–26 win over the Bills. In Week 6, he had eight receptions for 157 yards and a touchdown in the 38–17 loss to the Patriots. In Week 9, he had nine receptions for 174 yards and three touchdowns in the loss to the Dolphins. In the Colts' regular season finale against the Broncos, he had nine receptions for 128 yards and two touchdowns in the 29–10 victory. In the 2001 season, Harrison had 109 receptions for 1,524 receiving yards and 15 receiving touchdowns in 16 games and starts as the Colts went 6–10. He was named to his third consecutive Pro Bowl for his performance in the 2001 season.

=== 2002 ===
In Week 2 of the 2002 season, Harrison had 11 receptions for 144 yards and a touchdown in the 21–13 loss to the Dolphins. In Week 5, he had nine receptions for 145 yards and a touchdown in the win over the Bengals. In Week 10, in a victory over the Eagles, he had six receptions for 137 yards and two touchdowns. In Week 11, he had 14 receptions for 138 yards and two touchdowns in the 20–3 win over the Cowboys. He won AFC Offensive Player of the Month for November. In Week 15 against the Browns, he had nine receptions for 172 yards and two touchdowns in the 28–23 victory. For his game against the Browns, he won AFC Offensive Player of the Week. In 2002, Harrison broke Herman Moore's single-season receptions record by 20 receptions. He finished the Colts' 10–6 season with 143 catches for a league-leading 1,722 receiving yards and 11 touchdowns. He was named to his fourth consecutive Pro Bowl and earned first team All-Pro honors for the second time. Harrison receiving yardage marked the fourth most in NFL history for a single season at the time. The record stood until December 22, 2019, when Michael Thomas of the New Orleans Saints broke that record with 149. He finished runner-up to Priest Holmes for AP Offensive Player of the Year.

=== 2003 ===
In Week 4 of the 2003 season, Harrison had six receptions for 158 yards and three touchdowns in the 55–21 win over the Saints. In the following game against the Buccaneers, he had 11 receptions for 176 yards and two touchdowns in the 38–35 win. In the game the Colts were down 35–14 in the fourth quarter. Harrison's second touchdown brought the deficit to seven points. For his game against the Buccaneers, he won AFC Offensive Player of the Week. In the 2003 season, Harrison recorded 94 receptions for 1,272 receiving yards and ten receiving touchdowns in 15 games and starts as the Colts went 12–4 and won the AFC South. He was named to his fifth consecutive Pro Bowl. In the Colts' Wild Card Round victory over the Broncos, Harrison had seven receptions for 133 yards and two touchdowns.

=== 2004 ===
In Week 8 of the 2004 season, Harrison had five receptions for 119 yards and two touchdowns in the 45–35 loss to the Chiefs. In Week 12, in a win over the Lions, he had 12 receptions for 127 yards and three touchdowns. In the 2004 season, he recorded 86 receptions for 1,113 receiving yards and 15 receiving touchdowns in 16 games and starts as the Colts went 12–4 and won the AFC South. He was named to his sixth consecutive Pro Bowl.

=== 2005 ===
In 2005, Harrison had five 100+ yard receiving games in a seven-game stretch late in the season. He finished the 2005 season with 82 receptions for 1,146 receiving yards and a league-leading 12 touchdowns in 15 games and starts as the Colts went 14–2 and won the AFC South. He was named to his seventh consecutive Pro Bowl in recognition of his 2005 season.

=== 2006 ===
In the first two games of the 2006 season, Harrison had consecutive games over 100 yards in wins over the Giants and Texans. In Week 9, Harrison had eight receptions for 145 yards and two touchdowns in the 27–20 win over the Patriots. In Week 15, he had three touchdowns in the 34–16 win over the Bengals. In December 2006, Harrison became just the fourth player in NFL history to record 1,000 receptions, joining Jerry Rice (1,549), Cris Carter (1,101), and Tim Brown (1,094). He is one of only seven wide receivers in NFL history to reach 100 touchdowns. For December 2006, he won AFC Offensive Player of the Month. He finished the 2006 season with 95 receptions for 1,366 receiving yards and 12 receiving touchdowns in 16 games and starts. The Colts finished with a 12–4 record and won the AFC South. He was named to his eighth consecutive Pro Bowl and earned first team All-Pro honors for the third time. In the AFC Championship against the Patriots, he converted a two-point conversion on a pass from Manning in the third quarter. In Super Bowl XLI, Harrison had five receptions for 59 yards as he won his first Super Bowl with a 29–17 win over the Chicago Bears.

=== 2007 ===
In the 2007 season, Harrison appeared in only five regular season games due to a knee injury. It marked only the second time Harrison had missed regular-season action due to injuries and the first since 1998. He returned for the Colts' postseason loss to the Chargers in the Divisional Round.

=== 2008 ===
On December 14, 2008, in a game against the Detroit Lions, Harrison caught his 1,095th career reception, passing Tim Brown for third all time. He passed Cris Carter to become second on the all-time NFL reception record list with 1,102 receptions during a 23–0 Colts victory over the Tennessee Titans on December 28, 2008. He finished the 2008 season with 60 receptions for 636 receiving yards and five receiving touchdowns in 15 games and starts as the Colts went 12–4.

=== Retirement ===
After the 2008 NFL season, Harrison asked for and was granted his release by the Colts. After sitting out the entire 2009 season, Harrison quietly retired from the NFL. Harrison retired having recorded at least one reception in every game (regular season and postseason) that he played.

Harrison was inducted into the Indianapolis Colts Ring of Honor during the week 12 game against the Carolina Panthers on November 27, 2011. He is widely considered one of the greatest wide receivers in NFL history and was inducted into the Pro Football Hall of Fame in 2016.

Harrison was named to the Pro Football Hall of Fame First Team for the 2000s decade. Harrison was named to the NFL 100th Anniversary All-Time Team.

== Career statistics ==
Legend
	Won the Super Bowl
	Led the league
**Bold**	Career high

=== NFL ===
==== Regular season ====
Year	Team	Games		Receiving					Rushing					Fumbles	
Year	Team	GP	GS	Rec	Yds	Avg	Lng	TD	Att	Yds	Avg	Lng	TD	Fum	Lost
1996	IND	16	15	64	836	13.1	41	8	**3**	**15**	**5.0**	**15**	0	1	1
1997	IND	16	15	73	866	11.9	44	6	2	-7	-3.5	0	0	**2**	0
1998	IND	12	12	59	776	13.2	61T	7	—	—	—	—	—	0	0
1999	IND	16	16	115	1,663	**14.5**	57T	12	1	4	4.0	4	0	**2**	1
2000	IND	16	16	102	1,413	13.9	78T	14	—	—	—	—	—	**2**	1
2001	IND	16	16	109	1,524	14.0	68	**15**	1	3	3.0	3	0	0	0
2002	IND	16	16	**143**	**1,722**	12.0	69	11	2	10	**5.0**	8	0	0	0
2003	IND	15	15	94	1,272	13.5	79T	10	1	3	3.0	3	0	**2**	**2**
2004	IND	16	16	86	1,113	12.9	59	**15**	—	—	—	—	—	1	1
2005	IND	15	15	82	1,146	14.0	**80T**	12	—	—	—	—	—	0	0
2006	IND	16	16	95	1,366	14.4	68T	12	—	—	—	—	—	1	1
2007	IND	5	5	20	247	12.4	42	1	—	—	—	—	—	0	0
2008	IND	15	15	60	636	10.6	67T	5	—	—	—	—	—	1	1
Total		190	188	1,102	14,580	13.2	80T	128	10	28	2.8	15	0	12	8

==== Postseason ====
Year	Team	Games		Receiving					Fumbles	
Year	Team	GP	GS	Rec	Yds	Avg	Lng	TD	Fum	Lost
1996	IND	1	1	3	71	**23.7**	**48**	0	0	0
1999	IND	1	1	5	65	13.0	25	0	0	0
2000	IND	1	1	5	63	12.6	30	0	0	0
2002	IND	1	1	4	47	11.8	17	0	0	0
2003	IND	3	3	**16**	**250**	15.6	46	**2**	**1**	**1**
2004	IND	2	2	9	95	10.6	24	0	0	0
2005	IND	1	1	3	52	17.3	24	0	0	0
2006	IND	4	4	15	193	12.9	42	0	**1**	0
2007	IND	1	1	2	27	13.5	17	0	**1**	**1**
2008	IND	1	1	3	20	6.7	9	0	0	0
Total		16	16	65	883	13.6	48	2	3	2

=== College ===
College statistics
Season	Games		Receiving			
Season	GP	GS	Rec	Yds	Avg	TD
1992	10	0	2	13	6.5	0
1993	11	9	41	813	19.8	7
1994	10	10	36	761	**21.1**	5
1995	11	11	**56**	**1,131**	20.2	**8**
Total	42	30	135	2,718	20.1	20

== Career highlights ==
=== Awards and honors ===
NFL

- Super Bowl champion (XLI)
- 3× First-team All-Pro (1999, 2002, 2006)
- 5× Second-team All-Pro (2000, 2001, 2003–2005)
- 8× Pro Bowl (1999–2006)
- 2× NFL receiving yards leader (1999, 2002)
- 2× NFL receptions leader (2000, 2002)
- NFL receiving touchdowns co-leader (2005)
- NFL 2000s All-Decade Team
- NFL 100th Anniversary All-Time Team
- Indianapolis Colts Ring of Honor

College

- First-team All-American (1995)
- Big East Special Teams Player of the Year (1995)
- 3× All-Big East (1993–1995)

=== Records ===
==== NFL records ====
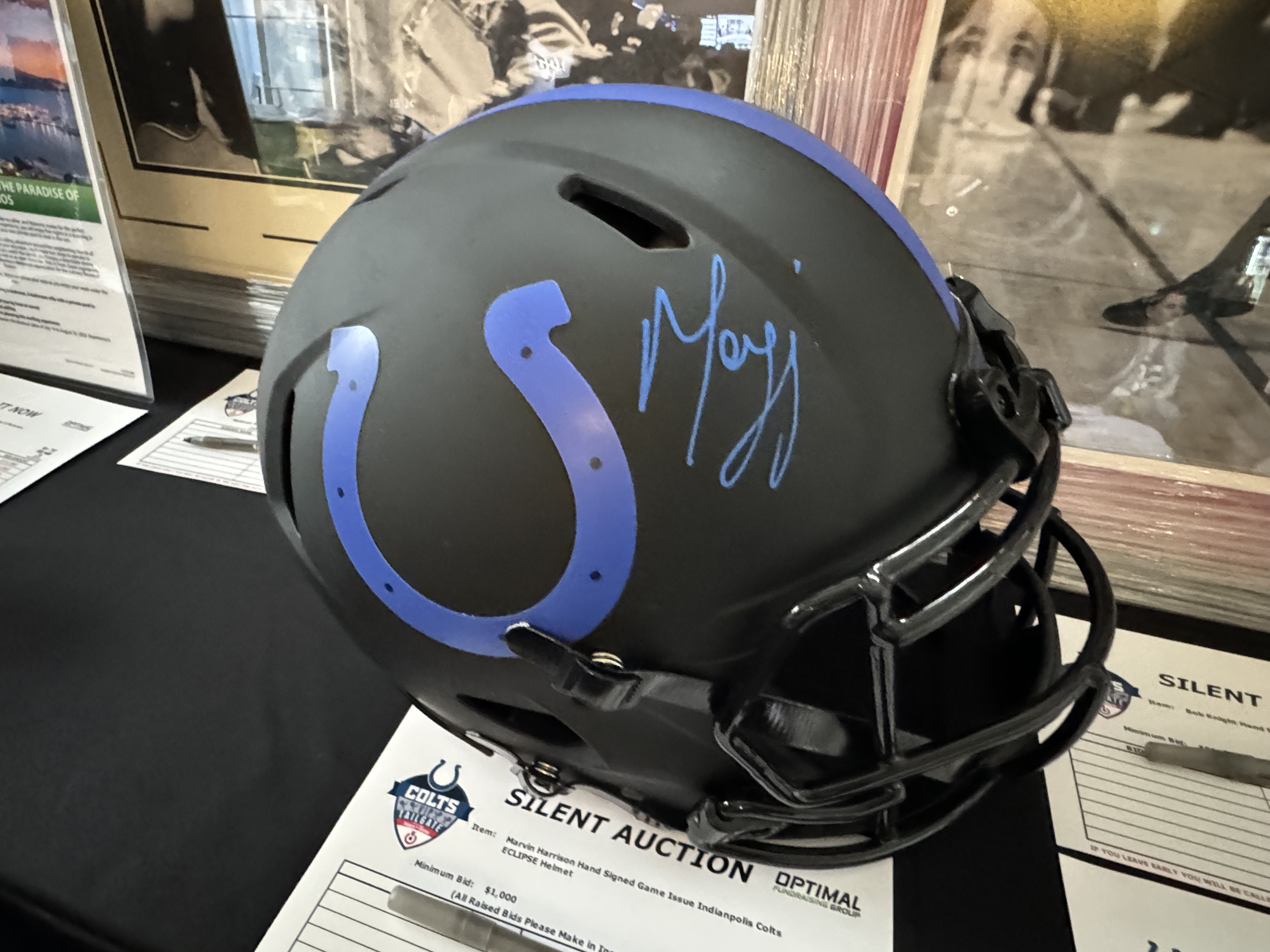
An Indianapolis Colts helmet autographed by Marvin Harrison at a silent auction in 2023

- Most receptions in an 8-season period (826), 1999–2006; 9 season period (885), 1998–2006; 10 season period (958), 1997–2006; 11 season period (1,022), 1996–2006
- Most consecutive games with at least 6 receptions (16) and 9 receptions (6)
- Most consecutive seasons with at least 5 touchdowns (11) – shared with Jerry Rice, Don Hutson, Cris Carter, Tim Brown, Terrell Owens, Frank Gore
- Most consecutive seasons with at least 6 touchdowns (11) – shared with Terrell Owens, Jerry Rice, Don Hutson
- Most consecutive seasons with at least 5 touchdown receptions (11) – shared with Jerry Rice, Don Hutson, Cris Carter, Tim Brown, Terrell Owens
- Most consecutive seasons with at least 6 touchdown receptions (11) – shared with Jerry Rice, Don Hutson
- Most consecutive seasons with at least 10 touchdown receptions (8)
- Most consecutive seasons with at least 11 touchdown receptions (4) – tied with Lance Alworth, Art Powell
- Most consecutive seasons with at least 14 touchdown receptions (2) – tied with Jerry Rice
- Consecutive seasons with 82+ receptions (8); 1999–2006
- Most games in a single season (2002) with at least 6 receptions (15), 8 receptions (12), 9 receptions (10)-tied by Julio Jones, 11 receptions (5)
- Marvin Harrison and Peyton Manning currently hold the NFL record for most completions between a wide receiver and quarterback with 953.
- Marvin Harrison and Peyton Manning currently hold the NFL record for passing touchdowns between a wide receiver and quarterback with 114.
- Marvin Harrison and Peyton Manning currently hold the NFL record for passing yards between a wide receiver and quarterback with 12,766.
- Marvin Harrison and Peyton Manning currently hold the NFL record for completions in a season between a wide receiver and quarterback with 143 in 2002.
- First player to record two seasons of 1,600 yards receiving in NFL history (1999 & 2002)
- First player to have 50+ receptions in his first 11 seasons in NFL history.
- Most consecutive seasons with at least 1,000 all-purpose yards and at least ten touchdown receptions (8), 1999–2006
- On December 18, 2006, Harrison and Indianapolis Colt teammate Reggie Wayne became the only NFL wide receiver tandem to catch 75 receptions and 1,000 yards in three straight seasons. The game was on Monday Night and was played against the Cincinnati Bengals.
- On December 10, 2006, made his 1,000th reception against the Jacksonville Jaguars. He is the fastest player to do so reaching the mark in 167 career games
- On December 28, 2008, made his 1,100th career reception against the Tennessee Titans in his last regular season game and his last game in Indianapolis. He is the fastest player to do so reaching the mark in 190 career games.
- Most receptions over first 7 seasons (665), 8 seasons (759), 9 seasons (845), 10 seasons (927), 11 seasons (1,022) and 13 seasons (1,102) of career of any NFL receiver
- Most consecutive games with a reception to start a career (190)
- Most average receptions per game in a career (5.8) – 1996–2008
- Most consecutive games with 8+ receiving yards (190), (206 if counting playoffs) – every game
- Most consecutive games with a 6+ yard reception (190), (206 if counting playoffs) – every game
- Most consecutive games with an 8+ yard reception (177), (192 if counting playoffs)

==== Indianapolis Colts franchise records ====
- Career receptions (1,102)
- Career receiving yards (14,580)
- Career receiving touchdowns (128)
- Career targets (1,781)
- Receptions per game, career (5.8)
- Receiving yards per game, career (76.7)
- Receptions, single season (143 in 2002)
- Receiving yards, single season (1,722 in 2002)
- Receiving touchdowns, single season (15 in 2001)
- Targets, single season (205 in 2002)
- Receptions per game, single season (8.9 in 2002)

== Personal life ==
Harrison's older son, Marvin Harrison Jr., is an NFL wide receiver. He played college football for the Ohio State Buckeyes and was selected in the first round of the 2024 NFL draft, 4th overall, by the Arizona Cardinals. Harrison's younger son, Jett Harrison, is also a wide receiver and committed to the Buckeyes in July 2026.

=== Legal issues ===
Harrison was sued in a civil lawsuit by Dwight Dixon, a convicted drug dealer, after Dixon was shot outside Chuckie's Garage, a North Philadelphia business owned by Harrison, on April 29, 2008. The two men had been in a fight minutes prior to the shooting over something that happened a few weeks earlier when Dixon and Harrison got into a verbal argument after Harrison denied Dixon entry into Playmakers, a sports bar owned and operated by Harrison. Dixon alleged that Harrison was the gunman who shot at him. On January 6, 2009, Philadelphia District Attorney Lynne Abraham confirmed the gun that fired shots at Dixon was the same model as Harrison's gun but said they had been unable to determine who pulled the trigger.

Abraham also said that she was not going to pursue charges in the case due to conflicting witness statements. In fact, within a week of the first shooting, Marvin Harrison was not considered a suspect. Dixon, who had initially given the police a false name and claimed he was robbed by two men when interviewed at the hospital, was then convicted of filing a false report for the incident on January 28, 2009. Dixon was sentenced to six months probation. His attorney reportedly sought a new trial; the conviction violated Dixon's parole in an unrelated case. Harrison was also sued by Robert Nixon, a victim who was caught in the crossfire of the shooting who identified Harrison as the shooter in a statement to the police.

Dixon died on July 21, 2009, after he was shot several times while he was in his car outside a building two blocks away from the sports bar. At the hospital after the shooting, detectives questioned Dixon before surgery. He asserted that it stemmed from the Harrison incident a year prior and that Harrison had hired a gunman to shoot him. An informant also made a statement to the effect that the gunman who killed Dixon was Lonnie Harrison, Marvin Harrison's cousin. On June 16, 2010, Shaun Assael of ESPN The Magazine reported that police confiscated a 9mm handgun from Harrison during a routine traffic stop on Wednesday in Philadelphia. They tested the gun to see if it matched three spent 9mm shell casings found inside the truck driven by Dwight Dixon at the scene of an April 2008 shooting. Dixon's claim, he was now deceased, was that the casings came from a second gun which Marvin Harrison fired. Authorities had already matched other bullets to a separate gun which Harrison owns—which he claimed was in his home on the day of the shooting. The police found the gun during a search of Harrison's Escalade. Harrison was stopped as he was driving the wrong way on a one-way street.

Harrison claimed he did not have a gun. But the police believed that they saw Harrison put what appeared to be a weapon in the center console between the two front seats. They concluded that they had probable cause to search the vehicle and they found the gun; however, Harrison was not charged.

Another incident occurred in 2014 when Harrison narrowly escaped a Philadelphia shooting.
