= 2007 Pro Bowl =

National Football League all-star game

2007 NFL Pro Bowl
NFC	AFC
28	31
Head coach: Sean Payton (New Orleans Saints)	Head coach: Bill Belichick (New England Patriots)
	1	2	3	4	Total
NFC	0	14	0	14	28
AFC	0	14	7	10	31
- Date: February 10, 2007
- Stadium: Aloha Stadium; Honolulu, Hawaii
- MVP: Carson Palmer (Cincinnati Bengals)
- Referee: Larry Nemmers
- Attendance: 50,410

Ceremonies
- National anthem: Jasmine Trias
- Coin toss: Honolulu Mayor Mufi Hannemann

TV in the United States
- Network: CBS
- Announcers: Greg Gumbel, Phil Simms, Dan Dierdorf, and Shannon Sharpe

The 2007 Pro Bowl was the National Football League's all-star game for the 2006 season. The game took place on February 10, 2007, at Aloha Stadium in Honolulu, Hawaii. The game was held on a Saturday instead of the usual Sunday after the Super Bowl because of a request by broadcaster CBS. The 2007 Pro Bowl marked the 28th consecutive time that the National Football League's all-star game was held in Honolulu. The NFC was coached by Sean Payton of the New Orleans Saints. The AFC was coached by Bill Belichick of the New England Patriots.

AFC quarterback Carson Palmer was selected as the Most Valuable Player of the game. This Pro Bowl is mainly remembered for Sean Taylor's big hit on Buffalo Bills punter Brian Moorman.

== Scoring summary ==
- 1st Quarter
  - None.
- 2nd Quarter
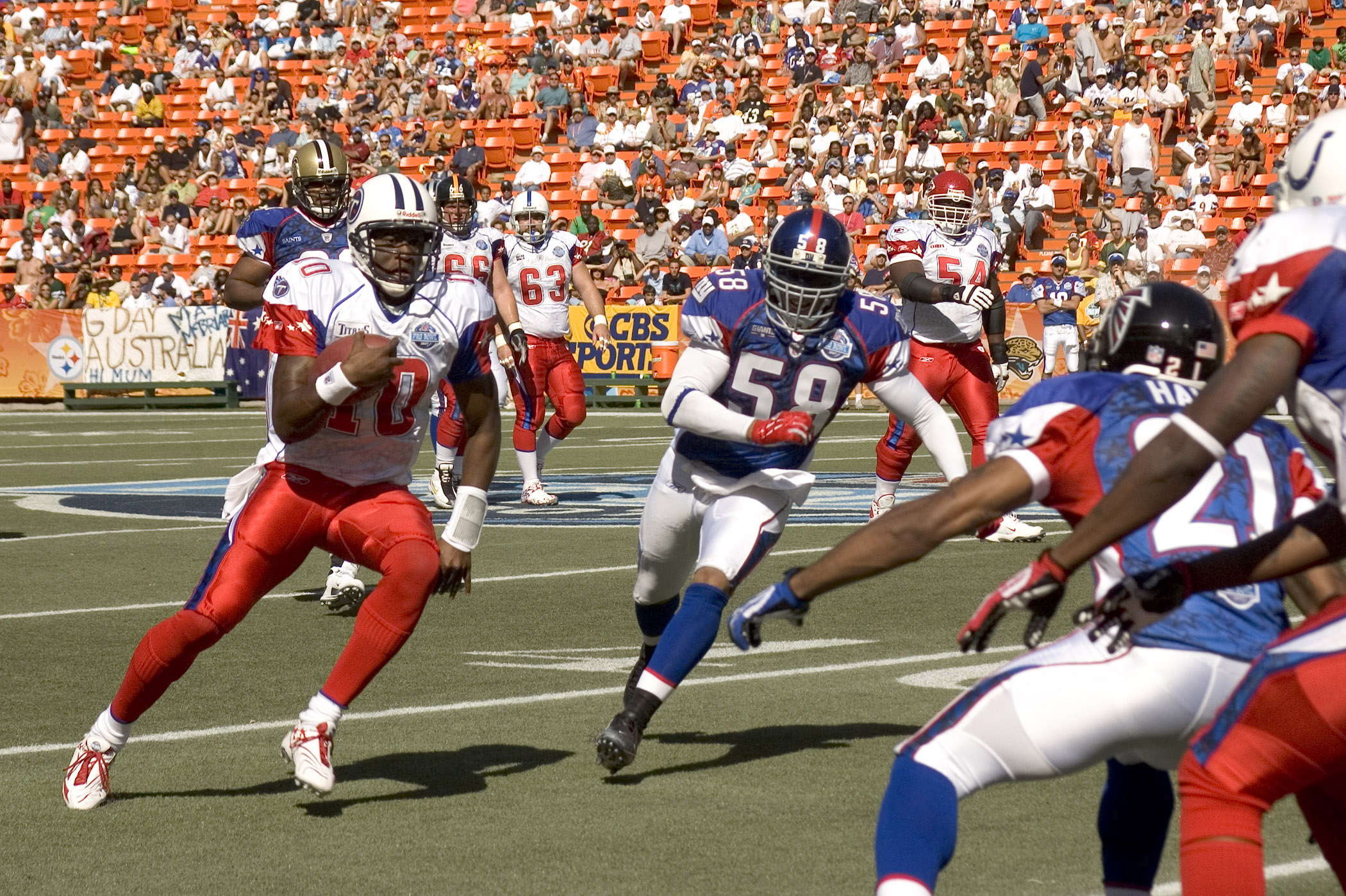
  AFC quarterback Vince Young scrambles past Antonio Pierce for a first down during the third quarter.
  - NFC – Tiki Barber 1-yard run (Robbie Gould kick), 12:24. NFC 7–0. Drive: 9 plays, 67 yards, 10:40.
  - AFC – Reggie Wayne 72-yard pass from Carson Palmer (Nate Kaeding kick), 11:19. Tied 7–7. Drive: 4 plays, 74 yards, 1:05.
  - AFC – Adalius Thomas 70-yard fumble return (Nate Kaeding kick), 7:42. AFC 14–7.
  - NFC – Frank Gore 1-yard run (Gould kick), 4:09. Tied 14–14. Drive: 7 plays, 53 yards, 3:33.
- 3rd Quarter
  - AFC – LaDainian Tomlinson 3-yard run (Nate Kaeding kick), 9:36. AFC 21–14. Drive: 9 plays, 57 yards, 5:19.
- 4th Quarter
  - AFC – Chad Johnson 42-yard pass from Palmer (Nate Kaeding kick), 12:47. AFC 28–14. Drive: 3 plays, 71 yards, 1:24.
  - NFC – Steven Jackson 4-yard run (Failed 2 pt. conversion pass from Tony Romo), 2:52. AFC 28–20. Drive: 4 plays, 11 yards, 1:25.
  - NFC – Anquan Boldin 47-yard pass from Tony Romo (S. Smith 2 pt. conversion pass from Tony Romo), 1:48. Tied 28–28. Drive: 4 plays, 58 yards, 1:04.
  - AFC – Nate Kaeding 21-yard FG, 0:00. AFC 31–28. Drive: 7 plays, 63 yards, 1:48.

== AFC roster ==
=== Offense ===
Position:	Starters:	Reserves:
Quarterback	18 Peyton Manning, Indianapolis	9 Carson Palmer, Cincinnati; 17 Philip Rivers, San Diego^{[b]} 10 Vince Young, Tennessee^{[a]}^{[e]}
Running back	21 LaDainian Tomlinson, San Diego	27 Larry Johnson, Kansas City; 39 Willie Parker, Pittsburgh
Fullback	41 Lorenzo Neal, San Diego	
Wide receiver	80 Andre Johnson, Houston; 85 Chad Johnson, Cincinnati	88 Marvin Harrison, Indianapolis; 87 Reggie Wayne, Indianapolis
Tight end	85 Antonio Gates, San Diego	88 Tony Gonzalez, Kansas City
Offensive tackle	71 Willie Anderson, Cincinnati^{[b]} 75 Jonathan Ogden, Baltimore^{[b]} 78 Tarik Glenn, Indianapolis^{[c]} 73 Marcus McNeill, San Diego^{[a]}^{[c]}	72 Matt Light, New England^{[a]}
Offensive guard	66 Alan Faneca, Pittsburgh; 68 Will Shields, Kansas City	54 Brian Waters, Kansas City
Center	63 Jeff Saturday, Indianapolis	61 Nick Hardwick, San Diego

=== Defense ===
Position:	Starters:	Reserves:
Defensive end	99 Jason Taylor, Miami; 94 Aaron Schobel, Buffalo	56 Derrick Burgess, Oakland
Defensive tackle	93 Richard Seymour, New England^{[b]} 76 Jamal Williams, San Diego; 98 Casey Hampton, Pittsburgh^{[c]}	98 John Henderson, Jacksonville^{[a]}
Outside linebacker	96 Adalius Thomas, Baltimore; 56 Shawne Merriman, San Diego	55 Terrell Suggs, Baltimore
Inside linebacker	56 Al Wilson, Denver^{[b]} 54 Zach Thomas, Miami^{[c]}	52 Ray Lewis, Baltimore^{[a]}^{[b]} 57 Bart Scott, Baltimore^{[a]}
Cornerback	24 Champ Bailey, Denver; 27 Rashean Mathis, Jacksonville	21 Chris McAlister, Baltimore
Strong safety	43 Troy Polamalu, Pittsburgh	
Free safety	20 Ed Reed, Baltimore	47 John Lynch, Denver

=== Special teams ===
Position:	Player:
Punter	8 Brian Moorman, Buffalo
Placekicker	10 Nate Kaeding, San Diego
Kick returner	22 Justin Miller, N.Y. Jets
Special teamer	81 Kassim Osgood, San Diego
Long snapper	50 David Binn, San Diego^{[d]}

== NFC roster ==
=== Offense ===
Position:	Starters:	Reserves:
Quarterback	9 Drew Brees, New Orleans	10 Marc Bulger, St. Louis; 9 Tony Romo, Dallas
Running back	21 Frank Gore, San Francisco	21 Tiki Barber, N.Y. Giants; 39 Steven Jackson, St. Louis
Fullback	38 Mack Strong, Seattle	
Wide receiver	81 Torry Holt, St. Louis^{[b]} 89 Steve Smith, Carolina; 80 Donald Driver, Green Bay^{[c]}	81 Anquan Boldin, Arizona; 11 Roy Williams, Detroit^{[a]}
Tight end	83 Alge Crumpler, Atlanta	80 Jeremy Shockey, N.Y. Giants^{[b]} 82 Jason Witten, Dallas^{[a]}
Offensive tackle	71 Walter Jones, Seattle; 70 Jammal Brown, New Orleans^{[b]} 76 Flozell Adams, Dallas^{[a]}^{[c]}	60 Chris Samuels, Washington
Offensive guard	76 Steve Hutchinson, Minnesota; 73 Shawn Andrews, Philadelphia^{[b]} 71 Larry Allen, San Francisco^{[c]}	74 Ruben Brown, Chicago^{[a]}
Center	57 Olin Kreutz, Chicago^{[b]} 78 Matt Birk, Minnesota^{[c]}	65 Andre Gurode, Dallas^{[a]}

=== Defense ===
Position:	Starters:	Reserves:
Defensive end	90 Julius Peppers, Carolina; 91 Will Smith, New Orleans	74 Aaron Kampman, Green Bay
Defensive tackle	91 Tommie Harris, Chicago^{[b]} 93 Kevin Williams, Minnesota; 77 Kris Jenkins, Carolina^{[c]}	94 Pat Williams, Minnesota^{[a]}
Outside linebacker	55 Lance Briggs, Chicago^{[b]} 94 DeMarcus Ware, Dallas; 59 Julian Peterson, Seattle^{[c]}	55 Derrick Brooks, Tampa Bay^{[a]}
Inside linebacker	54 Brian Urlacher, Chicago^{[b]} 51 Lofa Tatupu, Seattle^{[c]}	58 Antonio Pierce, N.Y. Giants^{[a]}
Cornerback	20 Ronde Barber, Tampa Bay; 21 DeAngelo Hall, Atlanta	26 Lito Sheppard, Philadelphia^{[b]} 27 Walt Harris, San Francisco^{[a]}
Strong safety	24 Adrian Wilson, Arizona	
Free safety	20 Brian Dawkins, Philadelphia^{[b]} 31 Roy Williams, Dallas^{[c]}	21 Sean Taylor, Washington^{[a]}

=== Special teams ===
Position:	Player:
Punter	1 Mat McBriar, Dallas
Placekicker	9 Robbie Gould, Chicago
Kick returner	23 Devin Hester, Chicago
Special teamer	94 Brendon Ayanbadejo, Chicago
Long snapper	83 Dave Moore, Tampa Bay^{[d]}

Notes:

^{a} Replacement selection due to injury or vacancy
^{b} Injured player; selected but did not play
^{c} Replacement starter; selected as reserve
^{d} "Need player"; named by coach
^{e} Tom Brady was first alternate, but he declined

== Number of selections by team ==
- 11 selections:
  - San Diego Chargers
- 8 selections:
  - Chicago Bears
- 7 selections:
  - Dallas Cowboys, Baltimore Ravens
- 5 selections:
  - Indianapolis Colts
- 4 selections:
  - Kansas City Chiefs, Minnesota Vikings, Pittsburgh Steelers, Seattle Seahawks
- 3 selections:
  San Francisco 49ers, Carolina Panthers, Cincinnati Bengals, Denver Broncos, New Orleans Saints, Philadelphia Eagles, St. Louis Rams, New York Giants, Tampa Bay Buccaneers
- 2 selections:
  - Arizona Cardinals, Atlanta Falcons, Buffalo Bills, Green Bay Packers, Jacksonville Jaguars, Miami Dolphins, New England Patriots, Washington Redskins
- 1 selection:
  - Tennessee Titans, Houston Texans, New York Jets, Oakland Raiders, Detroit Lions
- No selections:
  - Cleveland Browns

== Officials ==
- Referee: Larry Nemmers
- Umpire: Chad Brown
- Head Linesman: Ron Phares
- Line Judge: Tom Barnes
- Field Judge: Tom Sifferman
- Side Judge: Doug Toole
- Back Judge: Richard Reels
- Alternate: Walt Coleman

== 2007 Pro Bowl Cheerleading Squad ==
=== AFC ===
- Leslie Anderson, Baltimore Ravens
- Aimee, Buffalo Bills
- Deanna Hazeley, Cincinnati Bengals
- Holly Flahery, Denver Broncos
- Tiffany Engelking, Houston Texans
- Kristie Minton, Indianapolis Colts
- Amy Froemming, Jacksonville Jaguars
- Shanna Hill, Kansas City Chiefs
- Jaime Edmondson, Miami Dolphins
- Briana Lee, New England Patriots
- Megan Myers, Oakland Raiders
- Stacie Gazonas, San Diego Chargers
- Jennifer Hill, Tennessee Titans
- Brooke Bodnar, New York Jets

=== NFC ===
- Brooke Castaneda, Arizona Cardinals
- Jamie Ratliff, Atlanta Falcons
- Kelly Randazzo, Carolina Panthers
- Megan Fox, Dallas Cowboys
- Stephanie Baker, Minnesota Vikings
- Kristen Aucoin, New Orleans Saints
- Amanda Wynn, Philadelphia Eagles
- Janelle Delgado, San Francisco 49ers
- Colleen Murphy, Seattle Seahawks
- Erin Donnelly, St. Louis Rams
- Jessica Diaz, Tampa Bay Buccaneers
- Kimberly Linberger, Washington Redskins

== Sources ==
- "Palmer leads AFC to Pro Bowl win over NFC". NFL.com wire reports. February 10, 2007.
- "NFL Gamebook – 2007 Pro Bowl" (PDF). NFL.com. February 10, 2007.
