= Raymond Walls =

American football player (born 1979)

No. 22, 23
- Position: Cornerback

Personal information
- Born: July 24, 1979 (age 47); Kentwood, Louisiana, U.S.
- Listed height: 5 ft 10 in (1.78 m)
- Listed weight: 180 lb (82 kg)

Career information
- High school: Kentwood
- College: Southern Miss
- NFL draft: 2001: 5th round, 152nd overall pick

Career history
- Indianapolis Colts (2001–2002); Cleveland Browns (2002); Baltimore Ravens (2003–2004); Arizona Cardinals (2005); San Diego Chargers (2006)*
- * Offseason or practice squad member only

Career NFL statistics
- Games played: 41
- Starts: 3
- Tackles: 48
- Interceptions: 4
- Passes defended: 6
- Stats at Pro Football Reference

Raymond Omonical Tyshone Walls (born July 24, 1979) is an American former professional football player who was a cornerback in the National Football League (NFL). He played college football for the Southern Miss Golden Eagles and was selected in the fifth round of the 2001 NFL draft with the 152nd overall pick. In his career, he played for the Indianapolis Colts, Cleveland Browns, Baltimore Ravens, and Arizona Cardinals.
