= Tarik Glenn =

American football player (born 1976)

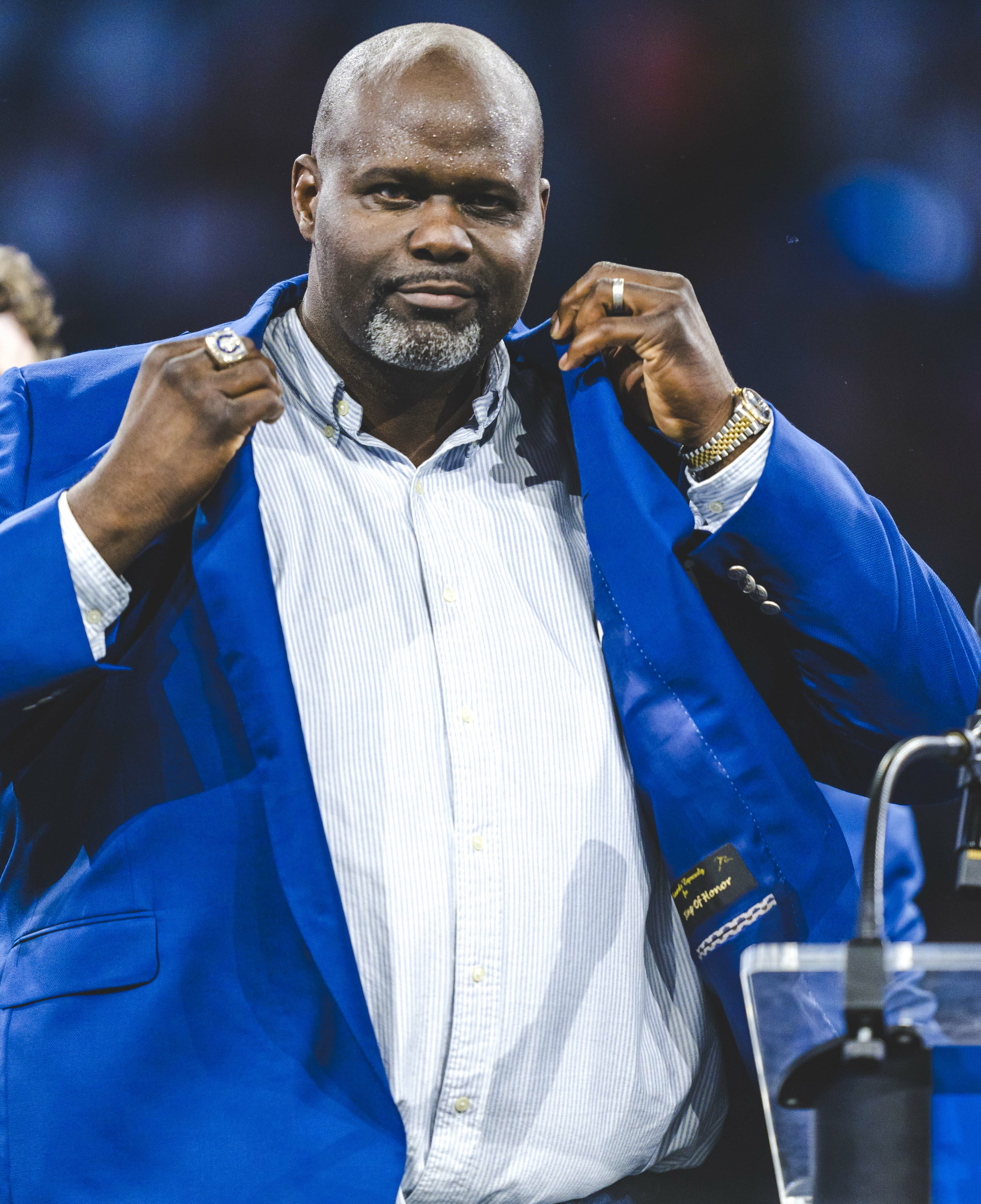
- Glenn in 2022

No. 78
- Position: Offensive tackle

Personal information
- Born: May 25, 1976 (age 50); Cleveland, Ohio, U.S.
- Listed height: 6 ft 5 in (1.96 m)
- Listed weight: 332 lb (151 kg)

Career information
- High school: O'Dowd (Oakland, California)
- College: California
- NFL draft: 1997: 1st round, 19th overall pick

Career history
- Indianapolis Colts (1997–2006)

Awards and highlights
- Super Bowl champion (XLI); 3× Pro Bowl (2004–2006); PFWA All-Rookie Team (1997); Indianapolis Colts Ring of Honor; First-team All-Pac-10 (1996); Second-team All-Pac-10 (1995)

Career NFL statistics
- Games played: 154
- Games started: 154
- Fumble recoveries: 2
- Stats at Pro Football Reference

Tarik Glenn (born May 25, 1976) is an American former professional football player who was an offensive tackle for 10 seasons with the Indianapolis Colts of the National Football League (NFL). He played college football for the California Golden Bears and was selected by the Colts in the first round of the 1997 NFL draft. Glenn made three Pro Bowls and was a part of the Colts team that beat the Chicago Bears in Super Bowl XLI.

== Early life and college ==
Glenn performed as two-way lineman at Bishop O'Dowd High School in Oakland, California, and later attended the University of California, Berkeley, where he was a four-year letterman and two-year starter. He started his career at defensive tackle before moving to offensive tackle in his junior year.

== Professional career ==
Pre-draft measurables
Height	Weight	Arm length	Hand span	40-yard dash	10-yard split	20-yard split	Vertical jump	Bench press
6 ft 5 1/4 in (1.96 m)	354 lb (161 kg)	33 5/8 in (0.85 m)	9 1/2 in (0.24 m)	5.75 s	1.95 s	3.35 s	23.0 in (0.58 m)	20 reps
All values from NFL Combine

Glenn was selected by the Indianapolis Colts in the first round (19th overall) of the 1997 NFL draft. He started all 16 games in seven of his 10 professional seasons, missing six games in 2003 with a knee injury. He made his first Pro Bowl appearance in the 2004 season, which wound up being the first of 3 consecutive Pro Bowls that he participated in. However, when the NFL told Glenn that he would also appear in the 2006 Pro Bowl, they later informed him that he did not receive enough votes, and that he would be an alternate. Glenn did end up participating in the 2006 Pro Bowl replacing the injured Willie Roaf. Tony Dungy, who generally backed the NFL, stated that he was disappointed with the way in which the NFL handled this particular situation.

On July 24, 2007, following winning Super Bowl XLI the season before, Glenn announced his retirement, saying he had lost his passion for football. Glenn was inducted into the Indianapolis Colts Ring of Honor at halftime of a Colts 2022 regular season game against the Washington Commanders.

== Personal life ==
In August 2011, Glenn became President of D.R.E.A.M. Alive, Inc., an Indianapolis-based non-profit organization founded by Glenn and his wife, Maya.

Glenn completed his BA degree in Social Welfare from UC Berkeley in 1999. He pursued a Master of Business Administration in the Executive Education program at the Purdue University Krannert School of Management, and graduated in December 2012.
