= Chris Polian =

American football executive

Cleveland Browns
- Title: Senior Personnel Executive

Personal information
- Born: New York City, U.S.

Career information
- College: John Carroll University

Career history
- Sacramento Gold Miners (1993) Personnel assistant; Carolina Panthers (1994–1997) Personnel assistant; Indianapolis Colts (1998–2000) Director of pro scouting; Indianapolis Colts (2001–2003) Assistant director of football operations; Indianapolis Colts (2004) Assistant general manager/football operations; Indianapolis Colts (2005–2009) Vice president of football operations; Indianapolis Colts (2009–2011) Vice president and general manager; Atlanta Falcons (2012) Executive scout; Jacksonville Jaguars (2013–2019) Director of pro personnel; Washington Football Team / Commanders (2021–2023) Director of pro personnel; Cleveland Browns (2024–present); Advisor to the general manager (2024-2025); Senior personnel executive (2026-present)

Awards and highlights
- Super Bowl champion (XLI)
- Executive profile at Pro Football Reference

Chris Polian is an American football executive who is a senior personnel executive for the Cleveland Browns of the National Football League (NFL). He previously served over ten years as a scout and executive with the Indianapolis Colts, including as their general manager, and has also worked for the Carolina Panthers, Atlanta Falcons, Jacksonville Jaguars, and Washington Football Team / Commanders. He is the son of former NFL general manager and Pro Football Hall of Famer Bill Polian and brother of college coach Brian Polian.

== Career ==
Polian was born in New York City and grew up there along with Kansas City, Winnipeg and Chicago before settling in Buffalo, New York after his father Bill Polian was hired as the general manager of the Buffalo Bills in the mid 1980s. He later attended John Carroll University and played for their football team before graduating with a bachelor's degree in communications in 1993.

Polian's professional career began as a personnel assistant for the Sacramento Gold Miners in 1993. The following year he followed his father and joined the Carolina Panthers, an expansion team, as an assistant and scout. After his father left the Panthers for the Indianapolis Colts in 1998, he followed him and became their director of pro scouting. After serving several other executive roles with the team, such as assistant director and vice president of football operations, he was promoted to general manager in 2009. Following a 2–14 season in 2011, both he and his father were dismissed from the team. He was part of the 2006 Colts team that won Super Bowl XLI.

He then worked for the Atlanta Falcons in 2012, scouting players from the Pac-12 Conference, prior to joining the Jacksonville Jaguars as their director of pro personnel in 2013. He served that role until being dismissed following the 2019 season. He spent the 2020 season out of football and before joining the Washington Football Team as their director of pro personnel in 2021. In 2024, Polian was hired by the Cleveland Browns as an advisor to general manager Andrew Berry.

== Personal life ==
Polian is the son of Pro Football Hall of Fame general manager Bill Polian and has two brothers, Brian and Dennis. He is married with three children.
