= Bill Polian =

American football executive (born 1942)

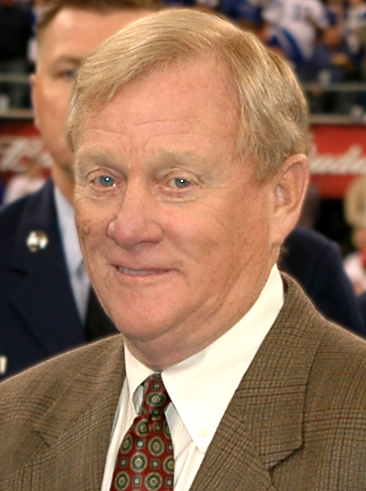
- Polian in 2007

Personal information
- Born: December 8, 1942 (age 83); The Bronx, New York, U.S.

Career information
- High school: Mount Saint Michael Academy (The Bronx, New York)
- College: NYU

Career history
- Montreal Alouettes (1976–1977) Scout; Kansas City Chiefs (1978–1982) Scout; Chicago Blitz (1983) Personnel director; Winnipeg Blue Bombers (1984) Personnel director; Buffalo Bills (1985) Pro personnel director; Buffalo Bills (1986–1992) General manager; Carolina Panthers (1995–1997) General manager; Indianapolis Colts (1998–2009) General manager and team president; Indianapolis Colts (2009–2011) Team president; Alliance of American Football (2019) Head of football

Awards and highlights
- Super Bowl champion (XLI); Grey Cup champion (1984); 6× NFL Executive of the Year (1988, 1991, 1995, 1996, 1999, 2009); Indianapolis Colts Ring of Honor; Buffalo Bills Wall of Fame
- Executive profile at Pro Football Reference
- Pro Football Hall of Fame

William Patrick Polian Jr. (born December 8, 1942) is an American former professional football executive. He rose to league prominence as the general manager of the Buffalo Bills, building a team that participated in four straight Super Bowls—the most consecutive appearances by any team—but lost each time. Following his stint in Buffalo, Polian went on to become the general manager of the expansion Carolina Panthers. He then served as general manager and team president of the Indianapolis Colts of the National Football League (NFL) from 1998 to 2011, where they reached two Super Bowls, winning Super Bowl XLI. He subsequently served as an NFL analyst for ESPN. Polian was elected to the Pro Football Hall of Fame in 2015. Polian co-founded the now-defunct Alliance of American Football in 2018.

Throughout the course of his career, Polian was awarded the NFL Executive of the Year award an NFL record six times, winning it twice with the Bills, twice with the Panthers, and twice with the Colts.

== Early life and college ==
Polian grew up in the Fordham section of the Bronx in New York City and graduated from Mount Saint Michael Academy in 1960. He attended the United States Merchant Marine Academy and graduated from New York University in 1964 with a history degree. At NYU, Polian played at safety for the NYU Violets football club team. He lived in Cornwall, New York from 1977 to 1983.

== Professional career ==
=== Early career ===
Polian began his career in professional football as a scout for the Montreal Alouettes in 1976, followed Marv Levy to the Kansas City Chiefs in 1978, eventually leaving the team in 1982 and joining the Chicago Blitz of the United States Football League, as personnel director in 1983. The Blitz shut down in 1984, and Polian moved back to the Canadian Football League, where he assembled a Grey Cup winning team with the Winnipeg Blue Bombers. Early on in his career, he was a coach for the now defunct football teams at Manhattan College and the Trinity School, both in New York City.

=== Buffalo Bills ===
Polian was general manager for the Buffalo Bills from 1986 to 1992. When Polian was promoted to general manager of the Bills on December 30, 1985, the Bills were suffering from back-to-back 2–14 seasons and fan interest was at an all-time low. Polian was originally hired as director of pro personnel for the Bills on August 2, 1984. Polian was instrumental in the signing of Bruce Smith to his first NFL contract, after which he was promoted to GM in 1985. While GM of the Bills, Polian won the NFL Executive of the Year Award twice, in 1988 and in 1991. After the 1992 season, on February 4, 1993, after the Bills had appeared in, and lost, their third straight Super Bowl, Polian was fired as general manager.

In 2012, Polian became the 28th inductee into the Buffalo Bills Wall of Fame.

=== Carolina Panthers ===
Polian was general manager of the Carolina Panthers from 1995 to 1997. He tried to create the quickest Super Bowl winner in history, and nearly did so, building a team that went to the NFC Championship Game in only its second year of existence. This feat led him to a promotion, becoming not just the GM, but the president of the Indianapolis Colts.

=== Indianapolis Colts ===
In 1998, Polian was hired as president and decided to build through the draft as the Indianapolis Colts would have the No. 1 overall pick for 1998; the Colts picked Peyton Manning. In 2002, Polian hired head coach Tony Dungy.

During his tenure, the Colts led the NFL with eight consecutive playoff appearances and seven consecutive seasons of 12 or more regular-season victories. They won seven division titles (1999, 2003–07, 09), won Super Bowl XLI against the Chicago Bears, and made a second Super Bowl appearance in Super Bowl XLIV under coach Jim Caldwell but lost to the New Orleans Saints. From 2000 to 2009, the Colts (115–45) set the NFL mark for most wins in a decade, and their nine playoff berths tied the NFL record set by Dallas in the 1970s. Polian stepped down as general manager in 2009, being succeeded by his son Chris, but remained with the team as president and vice-chairman.

In 2006, according to Jay Glazer of FOX Sports, Polian reportedly shoved a New York Jets employee by pinning him against a wall, for placing speakers too close to the field during warmups. The league required Polian to issue a written apology to the Jets employee.

Polian and his son Chris were fired by owner Jim Irsay after the Colts finished with a 2–14 record in the 2011 season.

On January 31, 2015, it was announced that Polian had been elected to the Pro Football Hall of Fame. On January 1, 2017, Polian became the 13th inductee into the Indianapolis Colts Ring of Honor.

=== Alliance of American Football and other ventures ===
After leaving the Colts, Polian joined ESPN, where he contributed to various studio programming and was an analyst for NFL games on ESPN Radio. Polian retired from ESPN in 2019.

In March 2018, Polian announced the creation of an off-season professional football league, called the Alliance of American Football, which he co-founded with Charlie Ebersol. The league began playing in February 2019, with television broadcasts produced by CBS Sports, and airing on CBS, CBS Sports Network, TNT, and NFL Network. On April 2, 2019, the league's football operations were suspended by controlling owner Thomas Dundon, who purchased his stake in the league shortly after it began play.

In January 2022, the Chicago Bears brought in Polian to help lead their search for a new head coach and general manager. The Bears went on to hire Colts defensive coordinator Matt Eberflus and Kansas City Chiefs director of player personnel Ryan Poles for the respective positions.

== Personal life ==
Polian is married to Eileen and has four kids: Lynn, Chris, Brian, and Dennis. Polian has nine grandkids: Annie, William, Jack, Caroline, Kate, Aidan, Charlotte, Finn, and Millie. Polian joined ESPN in 2012 as an NFL analyst.
