= 2008 Indianapolis Colts season =

56th season of American football franchise

- Owner: Jim Irsay
- General manager: Bill Polian
- Head coach: Tony Dungy
- Offensive coordinator: Tom Moore
- Defensive coordinator: Ron Meeks
- Home stadium: Lucas Oil Stadium

Results
- Record: 12–4
- Division place: 2nd AFC South
- Playoffs: Lost Wild Card Playoffs (at Chargers) 17–23 (OT)
- Pro Bowlers: QB Peyton Manning; WR Reggie Wayne; DE Dwight Freeney; DE Robert Mathis

Uniform
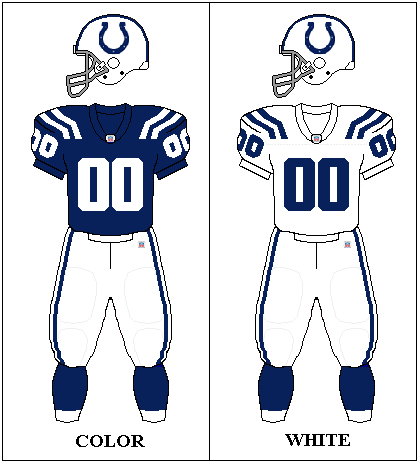

The 2008 Indianapolis Colts season was the 56th season for the team in the National Football League (NFL) and the 25th in Indianapolis. It was the first season since 2002 that the Colts did not win the AFC South title. However, after a 3–4 start on the season Peyton Manning led the Colts to a nine-game winning streak, a 12–4 record, and a wild card berth in the playoffs. The Colts' season came to an end in San Diego when they were defeated in the wild-card round against the San Diego Chargers.

The 2008 season was the Colts' inaugural season playing at Lucas Oil Stadium after playing at the RCA Dome for 24 seasons. This marks Tony Dungy's seventh and final season as head coach of the Colts, and Peyton Manning's 11th season as the starting quarterback. As a result of his play over the final two months of the regular season, Manning was awarded his third MVP award.

When the Colts won their seventh straight game in Week 15, they became the only team in the history of the NFL to have seven consecutive wins in five consecutive seasons. With their regular season record of 12–4, they became the first franchise in NFL history to have twelve wins in six consecutive seasons (the New England Patriots hold the record with 8 seasons, 2010–2017).

== Offseason ==
=== Coaching announcement ===
On January 21, 2008 Tony Dungy announced he would return for at least one more season. The Colts also announced that Assistant Head Coach Jim Caldwell would be promoted to Associate head coach and would assume the position of Colts Head Coach whenever Tony Dungy decides to retire.

=== Off-field activity ===
In May, ESPN The Magazine released the findings of its annual survey of over 80,000 fans entitled the "Ultimate Standings: Fan Satisfaction Rankings". The Colts ranked as the best major league sports franchise out of 122 teams from MLB, NFL, NBA, and the NHL. In August, ESPN.com ranked Colts' fans as the 16th best in the National Football League.

=== Released ===
- DT Booger McFarland
- LB Rob Morris
- WR Craphonso Thorpe
- DE Ed Johnson

=== Trades ===
- Traded FB Luke Lawton to the Philadelphia Eagles for a 2009 conditional draft pick.

=== Free agents ===
Pos.	Player	Tag	Result
OLB	Rocky Boiman	UFA	Signed with Eagles
TE	Dallas Clark	UFA	Re-signed with Colts
TE	Bryan Fletcher	RFA	Re-signed with Colts
C/G	Dylan Gandy	RFA	Re-signed with Colts
S	Matt Giordano	RFA	Re-signed with Colts
DT	Ed Johnson	ERFA	Re-signed with Colts
DT	Dan Klecko	UFA	Signed with Eagles
G	Ryan Lilja	UFA	Re-signed with Colts
WR	Aaron Moorehead	UFA	
DT/DE	Darrell Reid	RFA	Re-signed with Colts
TE	Mike Seidman	UFA	
G	Jake Scott	UFA	Signed with Titans
RB	Dominic Rhodes	UFA	Signed with Colts, from Raiders
DE	Josh Thomas	UFA	Re-signed with Colts
WR	Craphonso Thorpe	ERFA	Released
TE	Ben Utecht	RFA	Signed with Bengals
UFA: Unrestricted free agent; RFA: Restricted free agent; ERFA: Exclusive rights free agent

== 2008 NFL draft ==
2008 Indianapolis Colts Draft Selections
Draft order		Player	Position	Height	Weight	College
Round	Choice	Player	Position	Height	Weight	College
2	59	Mike Pollak	Center	6' 4"	292 lb (132 kg)	Arizona State
3	93	Philip Wheeler	Linebacker	6' 2"	238 lb (108 kg)	Georgia Tech
4	127	Jacob Tamme	Tight end	6' 5"	240 lb (110 kg)	Kentucky
5	161	Marcus Howard	Defensive end	6' 0"	237 lb (108 kg)	Georgia
6	196	Tom Santi	Tight end	6' 3"	250 lb (110 kg)	Virginia
6	201	Steve Justice	Center	6' 3"	293 lb (133 kg)	Wake Forest
6	202	Mike Hart	Running back	5' 8"	206 lb (93 kg)	Michigan
6	205	Pierre Garçon	Wide receiver	5' 11"	210 lb (95 kg)	Mount Union
7	236	Jamey Richard	Center	6' 4"	295 lb (134 kg)	Buffalo

== Roster ==
Indianapolis Colts 2008 final roster
Quarterbacks: 18 Peyton Manning; 12 Jim Sorgi; Running backs: 29 Joseph Addai; 27 Lance Ball; 49 Najeh Davenport KR; 38 Dominic Rhodes; 35 Chad Simpson KR; Wide receivers: 85 Pierre Garçon KR; 11 Anthony Gonzalez; 83 Roy Hall; 88 Marvin Harrison; 87 Reggie Wayne; Tight ends: 44 Dallas Clark; 47 Gijon Robinson; 84 Jacob Tamme	Offensive linemen: 71 Ryan Diem T; 76 Daniel Federkeil G/T; 74 Charlie Johnson G/T; 53 Steve Justice C/G; 78 Mike Pollak G; 61 Jamey Richard C/G; 63 Jeff Saturday C; 67 Tony Ugoh T; Defensive linemen: 79 Raheem Brock DE; 96 Keyunta Dawson DT; 68 Eric Foster DT; 93 Dwight Freeney DE; 92 Marcus Howard DE; 99 Antonio Johnson DT; 94 Curtis Johnson DE; 98 Robert Mathis DE; 90 Daniel Muir DT; 95 Darrell Reid DE; 91 Josh Thomas DE	Linebackers: 58 Gary Brackett MLB; 52 Buster Davis MLB; 56 Tyjuan Hagler OLB; 54 Freddy Keiaho OLB; 51 Jordan Senn OLB; 55 Clint Session OLB; 50 Philip Wheeler OLB; Defensive backs: 41 Antoine Bethea FS; 33 Melvin Bullitt SS; 43 Matt Giordano FS/SS; 26 Kelvin Hayden CB; 20 Dante Hughes CB; 23 Tim Jennings CB; 31 Keiwan Ratliff CB/PR; 21 Bob Sanders SS; 40 Jamie Silva SS; Special teams: 17 Hunter Smith P; 48 Justin Snow LS; 4 Adam Vinatieri K	Reserve lists: 25 Michael Coe CB (IR); 30 Clifton Dawson RB (IR); 37 Nick Graham CB (IR); 32 Mike Hart RB (IR); 28 Marlin Jackson CB (IR); 65 Ryan Lilja G (PUP); 34 T. J. Rushing CB (IR); 86 Tom Santi TE (IR); Practice squad: 42 Brannon Condren S; 39 Brandon Foster CB; 14 Sam Giguère WR; 72 Corey Hilliard T; 80 Jamie Petrowski TE; 6 Taj Smith WR; 36 Brandon Sumrall CB/S (IR); 75 Michael Toudouze T; rookies in italics 53 active, 9 inactive, 7 practice squad

== Staff ==
Indianapolis Colts 2008 staff
Front office: Owner/CEO – Jim Irsay; President – Bill Polian; Senior executive vice president – Pete Ward; Executive vice president – Bob Terpening; Vice president of football operations – Chris Polian; Director of football administration – Steve Champlin; Director of player personnel – Tom Telesco; Consultant to player personnel – Dom Anile, Sr.; Director of pro player personnel – Clyde Powers; Head coaches: Head coach – Tony Dungy; Associate head coach/quarterbacks – Jim Caldwell; Offensive coaches: Offensive coordinator – Tom Moore; Running backs – Gene Huey; Wide receivers – Clyde Christensen; Tight ends – Ricky Thomas; Offensive line – Howard Mudd; Offensive quality control – Pete Metzelaars	Defensive coaches: Defensive coordinator – Ron Meeks; Defensive line – John Teerlinck; Linebackers – Mike Murphy; Defensive backs – Alan Williams; Special assistant to the defense – Rod Perry; Defensive assistant – Bill Teerlinck; Special teams coaches: Special teams – Russ Purnell; Strength and conditioning: Strength and conditioning – Jon Torine; Assistant strength and conditioning – Richard Howell

== Schedule ==
=== Preseason ===
Week	Date	Opponent	Result	Record	Venue	Recap
HOF	August 3	Washington Redskins	L 16–30	0–1	Fawcett Stadium	Recap
1	August 9	at Carolina Panthers	L 20–23	0–2	Bank of America Stadium	Recap
2	August 16	at Atlanta Falcons	W 16–9	1–2	Georgia Dome	Recap
3	August 24	Buffalo Bills	L 7–20	1–3	Lucas Oil Stadium	Recap
4	August 28	Cincinnati Bengals	L 7–27	1–4	Lucas Oil Stadium	Recap

=== Regular season ===
Week	Date	Opponent	Result	Record	Venue	Recap
1	September 7	Chicago Bears	L 13–29	0–1	Lucas Oil Stadium	Recap
2	September 14	at Minnesota Vikings	W 18–15	1–1	Hubert H. Humphrey Metrodome	Recap
3	September 21	Jacksonville Jaguars	L 21–23	1–2	Lucas Oil Stadium	Recap
4	Bye					
5	October 5	at Houston Texans	W 31–27	2–2	Reliant Stadium	Recap
6	October 12	Baltimore Ravens	W 31–3	3–2	Lucas Oil Stadium	Recap
7	October 19	at Green Bay Packers	L 14–34	3–3	Lambeau Field	Recap
8	October 27	at Tennessee Titans	L 21–31	3–4	LP Field	Recap
9	November 2	New England Patriots	W 18–15	4–4	Lucas Oil Stadium	Recap
10	November 9	at Pittsburgh Steelers	W 24–20	5–4	Heinz Field	Recap
11	November 16	Houston Texans	W 33–27	6–4	Lucas Oil Stadium	Recap
12	November 23	at San Diego Chargers	W 23–20	7–4	Qualcomm Stadium	Recap
13	November 30	at Cleveland Browns	W 10–6	8–4	Cleveland Browns Stadium	Recap
14	December 7	Cincinnati Bengals	W 35–3	9–4	Lucas Oil Stadium	Recap
15	December 14	Detroit Lions	W 31–21	10–4	Lucas Oil Stadium	Recap
16	December 18	at Jacksonville Jaguars	W 31–24	11–4	Jacksonville Municipal Stadium	Recap
17	December 28	Tennessee Titans	W 23–0	12–4	Lucas Oil Stadium	Recap

== Standings ==
AFC South
	W	L	T	PCT	DIV	CONF	PF	PA	STK
^{(1)} Tennessee Titans	13	3	0	.813	4–2	9–3	375	234	L1
^{(5)} Indianapolis Colts	12	4	0	.750	4–2	10–2	377	298	W9
Houston Texans	8	8	0	.500	2–4	5–7	366	394	W1
Jacksonville Jaguars	5	11	0	.313	2–4	3–9	302	367	L2

== Game recaps ==
=== Week 1: vs. Chicago Bears ===
Quarter	1	2	3	4	Total
Bears	7	8	7	7	29
Colts	3	3	7	0	13

at Lucas Oil Stadium, Indianapolis

- Game time: 8:15 pm EDT
- Game weather: 74 °F (23 °C) (Mostly Cloudy)
- Game attendance: 66,822
- Referee: John Parry
- TV announcers (NBC): Al Michaels (play-by-play), John Madden (color commentator), and Andrea Kremer (field reporter)

The Colts began their 2008 campaign with their first official home game at Lucas Oil Stadium. For this Sunday night interconference duel, they took on the Chicago Bears in a rematch of Super Bowl XLI. In the first quarter, Indianapolis was first out of the gate as kicker Adam Vinatieri got a 39-yard field goal. The Bears responded with RB Matt Forte getting a 50-yard TD run. In the second quarter, the Colts responded with Vinatieri nailing a 34-yard field goal. However, Chicago increased its lead with kicker Robbie Gould getting a 41-yard field goal, DE Adewale Ogunleye tackling RB Joseph Addai in his endzone for a safety (first time Indy gave up a safety since November 2000), and Gould nailing a 25-yard field goal. In the third quarter, Indianapolis tried to rally as QB Peyton Manning completed a 6-yard TD pass to WR Reggie Wayne, yet the Bears replied with LB Lance Briggs returned a fumble 21 yards for a touchdown. In the fourth quarter, Chicago sealed the win with FB Jason McKie getting a 1-yard TD run.

With the loss, the Colts began their season at 0–1.

Scoring Summary

- 1st Quarter
  - IND – Adam Vinatieri 39 yard field goal, 5:52. Colts 3–0. Drive: 11 plays, 59 yards, 5:05.
  - CHI – Matt Forte 50 yard run (Gould kick), 4:59. Bears 7–3. Drive: 3 plays, 54 yards, 0:53.
- 2nd Quarter
  - IND – Adam Vinatieri 34 yard field goal, 9:38. Bears 7–6. Drive: 9 plays, 66 yards, 4:04.
  - CHI – Robbie Gould 41 yard field goal, 4:43. Bears 10–6. Drive: 10 plays, 43 yards, 4:55.
  - CHI – Joseph Addai tackled by Adewale Ogunleye for a safety, 4:05. Bears 12–6.
  - CHI – Robbie Gould 25 yard field goal, 0:00. Bears 15–6. Drive: 10 plays, 55 yards, 3:59.
- 3rd Quarter
  - IND – Reggie Wayne 6 yard pass from Peyton Manning (Vinetieri kick), 9:18. Bears 15–13. Drive: 7 plays, 52 yards, 3:47.
  - CHI – Lance Briggs 21 yard fumble return (Gould kick), 1:52. Bears 22–13.
- 4th Quarter
  - CHI – Jason McKie 1 yard run (Gould kick), 8:56. Bears 29–13. Drive: 8 plays, 48 yards, 4:46.

=== Week 2: at Minnesota Vikings ===
Quarter	1	2	3	4	Total
Colts	0	0	7	11	18
Vikings	6	3	6	0	15

at Hubert H. Humphrey Metrodome, Minneapolis

- Game time: 12:00 pm CDT/1:00 pm EDT
- Game weather: Game played indoors (domed stadium)
- Game attendance: 63,585
- Referee: Gene Steratore
- TV announcers (CBS): Greg Gumbel and Dan Dierdorf

Hoping to rebound from their home loss to the Bears, the Colts flew to the Hubert H. Humphrey Metrodome for a Week 2 interconference duel with the Minnesota Vikings. In the first half, Indianapolis trailed as Vikings kicker Ryan Longwell got a 45-yard and a 27-yard field goal in the first quarter, along with a 53-yard field goal in the second quarter. It marked the first time that the Colts got shut out in the first half since October 2006.

In the third quarter, Minnesota increased its lead with Longwell nailing a 46-yard and a 28-yard field goal. Afterwards, Indianapolis started to rally as RB Joseph Addai got a 1-yard TD run. In the fourth quarter, the Colts drew closer as QB Peyton Manning completed a 32-yard TD pass to WR Reggie Wayne, followed by a 2-point conversion run by RB Dominic Rhodes. Afterwards, near the end of game, Indianapolis completed its comeback as kicker Adam Vinatieri nailing the game-winning 47-yard field goal.

With the win, the Colts improved to 1–1.

Scoring Summary

- 1st Quarter
  - MIN – Ryan Longwell 45 yard field goal, 10:10. Vikings 3–0. Drive: 6 plays, 31 yards, 2:14.
  - MIN – Ryan Longwell 27 yard field goal, 0:09. Vikings 6–0. Drive: 8 plays, 43 yards, 3:56.
- 2nd Quarter
  - MIN – Ryan Longwell 53 yard field goal, 0:00. Vikings 9–0. Drive: 3 plays, 45 yards, 0:21.
- 3rd Quarter
  - MIN – Ryan Longwell 46 yard field goal, 10:38. Vikings 12–0. Drive: 8 plays, 34 yards, 4:22.
  - MIN – Ryan Longwell 28 yard field goal, 4:09. Vikings 15–0. Drive: 8 plays, 36 yards, 3:31.
  - IND – Joseph Addai 1 yard run (Vinatieri kick), 1:24. Vikings 15–7. Drive: 6 plays, 80 yards, 2:45.
- 4th Quarter
  - IND – Reggie Wayne 32 yard pass from Peyton Manning (Dominic Rhodes run), 5:54. Tied 15–15. Drive: 3 plays, 61 yards, 1:15.
  - IND – Adam Vinatieri 47 yard field goal, 0:03. Colts 18–15. Drive: 5 plays, 21 yards, 1:04.

=== Week 3: vs. Jacksonville Jaguars ===
Quarter	1	2	3	4	Total
Jaguars	0	10	7	6	23
Colts	7	7	0	7	21

at Lucas Oil Stadium, Indianapolis, Indiana

- Game time: 4:15 pm EDT
- Game weather: Game played indoors (Roof closed)
- Game attendance: 65,938
- Referee: Walt Coleman
- TV announcers (CBS): Dick Enberg and Randy Cross

Coming off their last-second road win over the Vikings, the Colts went home for a Week 3 AFC South duel with the Jacksonville Jaguars. In the first quarter, Indy was first out of the gates as QB Peyton Manning completed a 4-yard TD pass to WR Marvin Harrison. In the second quarter, the Jaguars took the lead with kicker Josh Scobee getting a 26-yard field goal, along with CB Rashean Mathis returning an interception 61 yards for a touchdown. The Colts reclaimed the lead before halftime as RB Joseph Addai got a 3-yard TD run.

In the third quarter, Jacksonville regained the lead with RB Maurice Jones-Drew getting a 6-yard TD run. In the fourth quarter, the Jaguars increased their lead with Scobee kicking a 21-yard field goal. Afterwards, Indianapolis responded with Addai's 2-yard TD run. However, the Jaguars got the last laugh as Scobee nailed the game-winning 51-yard field goal.

With the loss, the Colts entered their bye week at 1–2.

Scoring Summary

- 1st Quarter
  - IND – Marvin Harrison 4 yard pass from Peyton Manning (Vinatieri kick), 11:03. Colts 7–0. Drive: 7 plays, 80 yards, 3:57.
- 2nd Quarter
  - JAC – Josh Scobee 27 yard field goal, 12:33. Colts 7–3. Drive: 13 plays, 75 yards, 7:09.
  - JAC – Rashean Mathis 61 yard interception return (Scobee kick), 5:10. Jaguars 10–7.
  - IND – Joseph Addai 3 yard run (Vinatieri kick), 1:28. Colts 14–10. Drive: 11 plays, 74 yards, 3:42.
- 3rd Quarter
  - JAC – Maurice Jones-Drew 6 yard run (Scobee kick), 1:17. Jaguars 17–14. Drive: 7 plays, 71 yards, 3:59.
- 4th Quarter
  - JAC – Josh Scobee 21 yard field goal, 2:33. Jaguars 20–14. Drive: 18 plays, 82 yards, 12:18.
  - IND – Joseph Addai 2 yard run (Vinatieri kick), 1:07. Colts 21–20. Drive: 11 plays, 77 yards, 1:26.
  - JAC – Josh Scobee 51 yard field goal, 0:04. Jaguars 23–21. Drive: 7 plays, 47 yards, 1:03.

=== Week 5: at Houston Texans ===
Quarter	1	2	3	4	Total
Colts	10	0	0	21	31
Texans	0	17	3	7	27

at Reliant Stadium, Houston, Texas

- Game time: 12:00 pm CDT/1:00 pm EDT
- Game weather: 82 °F (28 °C) (Mostly Cloudy)
- Game attendance: 70,118
- Referee: Tony Corrente
- TV announcers (CBS): Greg Gumbel and Dan Dierdorf

Coming off their bye week, the Colts flew to Reliant Stadium for a Week 5 AFC South duel with the Houston Texans. In the first quarter, Indianapolis drew first blood as kicker Adam Vinatieri got a 46-yard field goal, along with RB Joseph Addai getting a 1-yard TD run. In the second quarter, the Texans responded with RB Steve Slaton getting a 1-yard TD run, kicker Kris Brown getting a 37-yard field goal, and QB Sage Rosenfels completing a 5-yard TD pass to WR Andre Johnson.

In the third quarter, Houston increased its lead with Brown nailing a 43-yard field goal. In the fourth quarter, the Texans continued its run as Slaton got a 1-yard TD run. The Colts rallied with QB Peyton Manning completing a 7-yard TD pass to rookie TE Tom Santi, LB Gary Brackett returning a fumble 68 yards for a touchdown, and Manning completing a 5-yard TD pass to WR Reggie Wayne.

With the win, Indianapolis improved to 2–2.

Scoring Summary

- 1st Quarter
  - IND – Adam Vinatieri 46 yard field goal, 9:42. Colts 3–0. Drive: 9 plays, 45 yards, 5:18.
  - IND – Joseph Addai 1 yard run (Vinatieri kick), 2:16. Colts 10–0. Drive: 10 plays, 64 yards, 5:22.
- 2nd Quarter
  - HOU – Steve Slaton 1 yard run (Brown kick), 12:06. Colts 10–7. Drive: 9 plays, 71 yards, 5:10.
  - HOU – Kris Brown 37 yard field goal, 7:09. Tied 10–10. Drive: 7 plays, 50 yards, 3:21.
  - HOU – Andre Johnson 5 yard pass from Sage Rosenfels (Brown kick), 0:27. Texans 17–10. Drive: 9 plays, 61 yards, 2:51.
- 3rd Quarter
  - HOU – Kris Brown 43 yard field goal, 0:21. Texans 20–10. Drive: 15 plays, 67 yards, 8:47.
- 4th Quarter
  - HOU – Steve Slaton 1 yard run (Brown kick), 8:18. Texans 27–10. Drive: 7 plays, 80 yards, 3:59.
  - IND – Tom Santi 7 yard pass from Peyton Manning (Vinatieri kick), 4:04. Texans 27–17. Drive: 11 plays, 81 yards, 4:14.
  - IND – Gary Brackett 68 yard fumble return (Vinatieri kick), 3:36. Texans 27–24.
  - IND – Reggie Wayne 5 yard pass from Peyton Manning (Vinatieri kick), 1:54. Colts 31–27. Drive: 2 plays, 20 yards, 0:42.

=== Week 6: vs. Baltimore Ravens ===
Quarter	1	2	3	4	Total
Ravens	0	0	3	0	3
Colts	17	7	7	0	31

at Lucas Oil Stadium, Indianapolis, Indiana

- Game time: 1:00 pm EDT
- Game weather: 75 °F (24 °C) (Sunny)
- Game attendance: 66,153
- Referee: Jerome Boger
- TV announcers (CBS): Jim Nantz and Phil Simms

Coming off their comeback divisional road win over the Texans, the Colts went home for a Week 6 duel with the Baltimore Ravens. In the first quarter, Indianapolis got a fast start as QB Peyton Manning completed a 67-yard TD pass to WR Marvin Harrison and a 22-yard TD pass to WR Reggie Wayne, while kicker Adam Vinatieri got a 37-yard field goal. In the second quarter, the Colts continued their dominating start as Manning completed a 5-yard TD pass to Harrison. In the third quarter, Indianapolis continued its victory march as RB Dominic Rhodes got a 1-yard TD run. The Ravens would get their only score of the game as kicker Matt Stover nailed a 37-yard field goal.

With the win, not only did the Colts improve to 3–2, but they finally got their first win in their new stadium.

Scoring Summary

- 1st Quarter
  - IND – Marvin Harrison 67 yard pass from Peyton Manning (Vinatieri kick), 9:43. Colts 7–0. Drive: 4 plays, 79 yards, 1:36.
  - IND – Reggie Wayne 11 yard pass from Peyton Manning (Vinatieri kick), 2:43. Colts 14–0. Drive: 10 plays, 61 yards, 4:55.
  - IND – Adam Vinatieri 37 yard field goal, 0:38. Colts 17–0. Drive: 4 plays, 9 yards, 1:13.
- 2nd Quarter
  - IND – Marvin Harrison 5 yard pass from Peyton Manning (Vinatieri kick), 1:48. Colts 24–0. Drive: 5 plays, 52 yards, 3:46.
- 3rd Quarter
  - IND – Dominic Rhodes 1 yard run (Vinatieri kick), 9:25. Colts 31–0. Drive: 11 plays, 80 yards, 5:35.
  - BAL – Matt Stover 37 yard field goal, 1:15. Colts 31–3. Drive: 15 plays, 62 yards, 8:10.
- 4th Quarter
  - No Scoring Plays

=== Week 7: at Green Bay Packers ===
Quarter	1	2	3	4	Total
Colts	7	0	0	7	14
Packers	3	14	10	7	34

at Lambeau Field, Green Bay, Wisconsin

- Game time: 3:15 pm CDT/4:15 pm EDT
- Game weather: 60 °F (16 °C) (Mostly Cloudy)
- Game attendance: 71,010
- Referee: Ron Winter
- TV announcers (CBS): Jim Nantz and Phil Simms

Coming off their home rout over the Ravens, the Colts flew to Lambeau Field for a Week 7 interconference duel with the Green Bay Packers. In the first quarter, Indianapolis trailed early as Packers kicker Mason Crosby got a 31-yard field goal. The Colts would take the lead as RB Dominic Rhodes got a 3-yard TD run. In the second quarter, Green Bay regained the lead as QB Aaron Rodgers completed a 12-yard TD pass to TE Donald Lee, along with RB Ryan Grant getting an 11-yard TD run.

In the third quarter, the Packers increased their lead as Free Safety Nick Collins returned an interception 62 yards for a touchdown, along with Crosby nailing a 29-yard field goal. In the fourth quarter, Green Bay finished its domination as Safety Aaron Rouse returned an interception 99 yards for a touchdown. Indianapolis's only response would be Rhodes' 1-yard TD run.

With the loss, the Colts fell to 3–3.

Scoring Summary

- 1st Quarter
  - GB – Mason Crosby 31 yard field goal, 8:06. Packers 3–0. Drive: 13 plays, 67 yards, 6:54.
  - IND – Dominic Rhodes 3 yard run (Vinatieri kick), 4:06. Colts 7–3. Drive: 10 plays, 70 yards, 4:00.
- 2nd Quarter
  - GB – Donald Lee 12 yard pass from Aaron Rodgers (Crosby kick), 14:15. Packers 10–7. Drive: 8 plays, 80 yards, 4:51.
  - GB – Ryan Grant 11 yard run (Crosby kick), 2:49. Packers 17–7. Drive: 11 plays, 89 yards, 6:51.
- 3rd Quarter
  - GB – Nick Collins 62 yard interception return (Crosby kick), 12:28. Packers 24–7.
  - GB – Mason Crosby 29 yard field goal, 2:37. Packers 27–7. Drive: 12 plays, 53 yards, 6:24.
- 4th Quarter
  - GB – Aaron Rouse 99 yard interception return (Crosby kick), 4:27. Packers 34–7.
  - IND – Dominic Rhodes 1 yard run (Vinatieri kick), 1:41. Packers 34–14. Drive: 11 plays, 86 yards, 2:46.

=== Week 8: at Tennessee Titans ===
Quarter	1	2	3	4	Total
Colts	7	0	7	7	21
Titans	3	3	8	17	31

at LP Field, Nashville, Tennessee

- Game time: 7:30 pm CDT/8:30 pm EDT
- Game weather: 45 °F (7 °C) (Clear)
- Game attendance: 69,143
- Referee: Mike Carey
- TV announcers (ESPN): Mike Tirico (play-by-play), Ron Jaworski and Tony Kornheiser (color commentators), Suzy Kolber and Michele Tafoya (sideline reporters)

Hoping to rebound from their road loss to the Packers, the Colts went to LP Field for a Week 8 MNF interconference duel with the undefeated Tennessee Titans. In the first quarter, Indianapolis trailed early as Titans kicker Rob Bironas got a 34-yard field goal. The Colts responded with QB Peyton Manning completing a 10-yard TD pass to TE Dallas Clark. In the second quarter, Tennessee drew closer as Bironas got a 44-yard field goal.

In the third quarter, Indianapolis increased its lead as Manning hooked up with Clark again on a 19-yard TD pass. Afterwards, the Titans tied the game as RB LenDale White got a 1-yard TD run. In the fourth quarter, Tennessee pulled away as Bironas nailed a 48-yard field goal, White got another 1-yard TD run, and RB Chris Johnson got a 16-yard TD run. The Colts tried to rally as Manning got a 1-yard TD run, but the Titans defense stiffened and prevailed. This was also the Colts' last regular season loss until December 27, 2009, when their former division rival New York Jets ended the Colts' hopes of a perfect season.

With the loss, Indianapolis fell to 3–4.

Scoring Summary

- 1st Quarter
  - TEN – Rob Bironas 34 yard field goal, 9:47. Titans 3–0. Drive: 11 plays, 40 yards, 5:17.
  - IND – Dallas Clark 10 yard pass from Peyton Manning (Vinatieri kick), 1:21. Colts 7–3. Drive: 4 plays, 37 yards, 1:21.
- 2nd Quarter
  - TEN – Rob Bironas 44 yard field goal, 14:19. Colts 7–6. Drive: 9 plays, 40 yards, 4:13.
- 3rd Quarter
  - IND – Dallas Clark 19 yard pass from Peyton Manning (Vinatieri kick), 11:10. Colts 14–6. Drive: 9 plays, 64 yards, 3:54.
  - TEN – LenDale White 1 yard run (Collins to Hall), 3:24. Tied 14–14. Drive: 14 plays, 80 yards, 7:45.
- 4th Quarter
  - TEN – Rob Bironas 48 yard field goal, 14:50. Titans 17–14. Drive: 6 plays, 17 yards, 1:09.
  - TEN – LenDale White 1 yard run (Bironas kick), 4:42. Titans 24–14. Drive: 13 plays, 66 yards, 6:51.
  - TEN – Chris Johnson 16 yard run (Bironas kick), 3:38. Titans 31–14. Drive: 1 play, 16 yards, 0:07.
  - IND – Peyton Manning 1 yard run (Vinatieri kick), 1:20. Titans 31–21. Drive: 11 plays, 71 yards, 2:14.

=== Week 9: vs. New England Patriots ===
Quarter	1	2	3	4	Total
Patriots	0	6	6	3	15
Colts	7	0	8	3	18

at Lucas Oil Stadium, Indianapolis, Indiana

- Game time: 8:15 pm EST
- Game weather: 62 °F (17 °C) (Partly Cloudy)
- Game attendance: 66,508
- Referee: Bill Carollo
- TV announcers (NBC): Al Michaels (play-by-play), John Madden (color commentator), and Andrea Kremer (field reporter)

Trying to rebound from their MNF divisional road loss to the Titans, the Colts went home for a Week 9 Sunday night duel with their hated rival, the New England Patriots. In the first quarter, Indianapolis got off to a fast start as QB Peyton Manning completed a 12-yard TD pass to WR Anthony Gonzalez. In the second quarter, the Patriots responded as kicker Stephen Gostkowski got a 29-yard and a 35-yard field goal. In the third quarter, New England took the lead as RB BenJarvus Green-Ellis got a 6-yard TD run (with a failed 2-point conversion). The Colts would answer with Manning hooking up with Gonzalez again on a 9-yard TD pass, along with completing a 2-point conversion pass to WR Reggie Wayne. In the fourth quarter, the Patriots tied the game with Gostkowski getting a 25-yard field goal, yet Indy replied with former Patriot kicker Adam Vinatieri nailing a 52-yard field goal. Afterwards, Indianapolis's defense prevented New England's last attempt at a comeback.

With the win, the Colts improved to 4–4.

Scoring Summary

- 1st Quarter
  - IND – Anthony Gonzalez 12 yard pass from Peyton Manning (Vinatieri kick), 2:22. Colts 7–0. Drive: 15 plays, 91 yards, 9:02.
- 2nd Quarter
  - NE – Stephen Gostkowski 29 yard field goal, 10:24. Colts 7–3. Drive: 13 plays, 56 yards, 6:58.
  - NE – Stephen Gostkowski 29 yard field goal, 1:31. Colts 7–6. Drive: 13 plays, 61 yards, 6:18.
- 3rd Quarter
  - NE – BenJarvus Green-Ellis 6 yard run (Two-point conversion attempt failed), 7:18. Patriots 12–7. Drive: 15 plays, 72 yards, 7:48.
  - IND – Anthony Gonzalez 9 yard pass from Peyton Manning (Manning to Wayne), 3:18. Colts 15–12. Drive: 9 plays, 57 yards, 4:00.
- 4th Quarter
  - NE – Stephen Gostkowski 25 yard field goal, 11:38. Tied 15–15. Drive: 15 plays, 69 yards, 6:39.
  - IND – Adam Vinatieri 52 yard field goal, 8:09. Colts 18–15. Drive: 8 plays, 48 yards, 3:28.

=== Week 10: at Pittsburgh Steelers ===
Quarter	1	2	3	4	Total
Colts	7	7	3	7	24
Steelers	7	10	0	3	20

at Heinz Field, Pittsburgh

- Game time: 4:15 pm EST
- Game weather: 44 °F (7 °C) (Cloudy)
- Game attendance: 64,043
- Referee: John Parry
- TV announcers (CBS): Jim Nantz and Phil Simms

Coming off their Sunday night home win over the Patriots, the Colts flew to Heinz Field for a Week 10 duel with the Pittsburgh Steelers. In the first quarter, Indianapolis trailed early as Steelers RB Mewelde Moore got a 1-yard TD run. The Colts immediately responded with QB Peyton Manning completing a 65-yard TD pass to WR Reggie Wayne. In the second quarter, Pittsburgh answered with Moore getting another 1-yard TD run, along with kicker Jeff Reed getting a 42-yard field goal. Indianapolis closed out the half with Manning completing a 2-yard TD pass to TE Dallas Clark.

In the third quarter, the Colts tied the game with kicker Adam Vinatieri getting a 36-yard field goal. In the fourth quarter, the Steelers regained the lead as Reed nailed a 24-yard field goal. Indianapolis took the lead as Manning completing a 17-yard TD pass to RB Dominic Rhodes, along with the defense preventing any Pittsburgh comeback.

The Colts improved to 5–4 and defeated the Steelers on the road in Pittsburgh for the first time since the 1968 season, ending a 12-game road losing streak to them.

Scoring Summary

- 1st Quarter
  - PIT – Mewelde Moore 1 yard run (Reed kick), 9:10. Steelers 7–0. Drive: 10 plays, 62 yards, 5:53.
  - IND – Reggie Wayne 65 yard pass from Peyton Manning (Vinatieri kick), 7:52. Tied 7–7. Drive: 4 plays, 77 yards, 1:26.
- 2nd Quarter
  - PIT – Mewelde Moore 1 yard run (Reed kick), 13:23. Steelers 14–7. Drive: 8 plays, 77 yards, 4:19.
  - PIT – Jeff Reed 42 yard field goal, 4:22. Steelers 17–7. Drive: 9 plays, 34 yards, 4:28.
  - IND – Dallas Clark 2 yard pass from Peyton Manning (Vinatieri kick), 0:09. Steelers 17–14. Drive: 6 plays, 30 yards, 1:18.
- 3rd Quarter
  - IND – Adam Vinatieri 36 yard field goal, 8:18. Tied 17–17. Drive: 12 plays, 56 yards, 6:46.
- 4th Quarter
  - PIT – Jeff Reed 24 yard field goal, 8:01. Steelers 20–17. Drive: 14 plays, 64 yards, 8:27.
  - IND – Dominic Rhodes 17 yard pass from Peyton Manning (Vinatieri kick), 3:10. Colts 24–20. Drive: 4 plays, 32 yards, 1:40.

=== Week 11: vs. Houston Texans ===
Quarter	1	2	3	4	Total
Texans	6	7	7	7	27
Colts	3	6	14	10	33

at Lucas Oil Stadium, Indianapolis, Indiana

- Game time: 1:00 pm EST
- Game weather: Game played indoors (Roof closed)
- Game attendance: 66,201
- Referee: Carl Cheffers
- TV announcers (CBS): Gus Johnson and Steve Tasker

Coming off their road win over the Steelers, the Colts went home for a Week 11 AFC South rematch with the Houston Texans. In the first quarter, Indianapolis trailed early as Texans kicker Kris Brown got a 28-yard field goal. The Colts responded with kicker Adam Vinatieri getting a 40-yard field goal. Houston would answer with Brown making a 34-yard field goal. In the second quarter, Indy tied the game as Vinatieri got a 39-yard field goal. The Texans retook the lead as RB Ahman Green got a 1-yard TD run. Indianapolis closed out the half as Vinatieri made a 32-yard field goal.

In the third quarter, the Colts took the lead as QB Peyton Manning completed a 23-yard TD pass to RB Joseph Addai. Houston would reply as RB Steve Slaton got a 71-yard TD run, yet Indy regained the lead as Addai got a 7-yard TD run. In the fourth quarter, the Texans tried to come back as Green got a 2-yard field goal, yet Indianapolis pulled away with Vinatieri nailing a 31-yard field goal. On the Texans' final drive, QB Sage Rosenfels was intercepted by safety Melvin Bullitt (who was filling in again for the injured Bob Sanders). Ironically, it was Bullitt who picked off Rosenfels on the Texans' final drive when they played the Colts in Week 5. Manning then took a knee, preserving the Colts' third consecutive victory.

With the season-sweep, the Colts improved to 6–4.

Scoring summary

- 1st Quarter
  - HOU – Kris Brown 28-yard field goal, 9:25. Texans 3–0. Drive: 10 plays, 70 yards, 5:39.
  - IND – Adam Vinatieri 40-yard field goal, 5:43. Tied 3–3. Drive: 9 plays, 27 yards, 3:42.
  - HOU – Kris Brown 34-yard field goal, 3:02. Texans 6–3. Drive: 5 plays, 56 yards, 2:41.
- 2nd Quarter
  - IND – Adam Vinatieri 39-yard field goal, 11:39. Tied 6–6. Drive: 14 plays, 53 yards, 6:24.
  - HOU – Ahman Green 1-yard run (Brown kick), 2:56. Texans 13–6. Drive: 9 plays, 41 yards, 4:56.
  - IND – Adam Vinatieri 32-yard field goal, 0:10. Texans 13–9. Drive: 13 plays, 66 yards, 2:46.
- 3rd Quarter
  - IND – Joseph Addai 23-yard pass from Peyton Manning (Vinatieri kick), 11:14. Colts 16–13. Drive: 10 plays, 81 yards, 3:52.
  - HOU – Steve Slaton 71-yard run (Brown kick), 9:42. Texans 20–16. Drive: 3 plays, 79 yards, 1:38.
  - IND – Joseph Addai 7-yard run (Vinatieri kick), 6:19. Colts 23–20. Drive: 7 plays, 80 yards, 3:16.
- 4th Quarter
  - IND – Marvin Harrison 10-yard pass from Peyton Manning (Vinatieri kick), 15:00. Colts 30–20. Drive: 11 plays, 73 yards, 4:32.
  - HOU – Ahman Green 2 yard run (Brown kick), 9:00. Colts 30–27. Drive: 10 plays, 77 yards, 6:02.
  - IND – Adam Vinatieri 31-yard field goal, 1:57. Colts 33–27. Drive: 16 plays, 69 yards, 7:02.

=== Week 12: at San Diego Chargers ===
Quarter	1	2	3	4	Total
Colts	3	7	7	6	23
Chargers	0	10	0	10	20

at Qualcomm Stadium, San Diego, California

- Game time: 5:15 pm PST/8:15 pm EST
- Game weather: 58 °F (14 °C) (Clear)
- Game attendance: 68,428
- Referee: Gene Steratore
- TV announcers (NBC): Al Michaels (play-by-play), John Madden (color commentator), and Andrea Kremer (field reporter)

Coming off their divisional home win over the Texans, the Colts flew to Qualcomm Stadium for a Week 12 Sunday night game with the San Diego Chargers. In the first quarter, Indianapolis took the lead as kicker Adam Vinatieri got a 23-yard field goal. In the second quarter, the Chargers took the lead as kicker Nate Kaeding made a 35-yard field goal, while QB Philip Rivers completed a 39-yard TD pass to WR Vincent Jackson. The Colts would tie the game as QB Peyton Manning completed a 13-yard TD pass to WR Anthony Gonzalez.

In the third quarter, Indianapolis took the lead as Manning completed a 1-yard TD pass to RB Dominic Rhodes. In the fourth quarter, the Colts added onto their lead as Vinatieri got a 38-yard field goal. San Diego cut the Colts' lead to 3 as Rivers completed a 1-yard TD pass to FB Jacob Hester, and then Kaeding kicked a 47-yard field goal to tie the game. However, Indianapolis sealed the deal as Vinatieri nailed the game-winning 51-yard field goal. By making the kick, Vinatieri redeemed himself after missing a game-winning 29-yard field goal against San Diego in the previous season.

With the win, the Colts improved to 7–4.

Scoring Summary

- 1st Quarter
  - IND – Adam Vinatieri 23 yard field goal, 1:45. Colts 3–0. Drive: 12 plays, 62 yards, 5:40.
- 2nd Quarter
  - SD – Nate Kaeding 35 yard field goal, 11:47. Tied 3–3. Drive: 9 plays, 66 yards, 4:59.
  - SD – Vincent Jackson 39 yard pass from Philip Rivers (Kaeding kick), 5:05. Chargers 10–3. Drive: 9 plays, 89 yards, 4:35.
  - IND – Anthony Gonzalez 13 yard pass from Peyton Manning (Vinatieri kick), 0:43. Tied 10–10. Drive: 9 plays, 71 yards, 4:18.
- 3rd Quarter
  - IND – Dominic Rhodes 1 yard pass from Peyton Manning (Vinatieri kick), 3:54. Colts 17–10. Drive: 13 plays, 66 yards, 7:10.
- 4th Quarter
  - IND – Adam Vinatieri 38 yard field goal, 11:51. Colts 20–10. Drive: 13 plays, 62 yards, 4:10.
  - SD – Jacob Hester 1 yard pass from Philip Rivers (Kaeding kick), 5:40. Colts 20–17. Drive: 12 plays, 70 yards, 6:12.
  - SD – Nate Kaeding 47 yard field goal, 1:35. Tied 20–20. Drive: 8 plays, 58 yards, 1:45.
  - IND – Adam Vinatieri 51 yard field goal, 0:02. Colts 23–20. Drive: 8 plays, 37 yards, 1:30.

=== Week 13: at Cleveland Browns ===
Quarter	1	2	3	4	Total
Colts	3	0	0	7	10
Browns	3	3	0	0	6

at Cleveland Browns Stadium, Cleveland, Ohio

- Game time: 1:00 pm EST
- Game weather: 36 °F (2 °C) (Clouds & Rain)
- Game attendance: 72,411
- Referee: Terry McAulay
- TV announcers (CBS): Dick Enberg and Randy Cross

Coming off the Sunday Night road win over the Chargers, the Colts flew to Cleveland Browns Stadium for a Week 13 duel with the Cleveland Browns. In the first quarter, Indianapolis trailed early as Browns kicker Phil Dawson got a 34-yard field goal. The Colts would respond with kicker Adam Vinatieri getting a 30-yard field goal. In the second quarter, Cleveland took the lead as Dawson nailed a 25-yard field goal. After a scoreless third quarter, Indianapolis's defense made the game's key play in the fourth quarter, as DE Dwight Freeney forced a fumble, allowing fellow DE Robert Mathis to return the fumble recovery 37 yards for a touchdown. From there on out, Indy's defense prevented any possible comeback.

With the win, the Colts improved to 8–4.

Scoring Summary

- 1st Quarter
  - CLE – Phil Dawson 34 yard field goal, 9:09. Browns 3–0. Drive: 10 plays, 30 yards, 5:32.
  - IND – Adam Vinatieri 30 yard field goal, 2:02. Tied 3–3. Drive: 12 plays, 65 yards, 7:06.
- 2nd Quarter
  - CLE – Phil Dawson 25 yard field goal, 7:36. Browns 6–3. Drive: 16 plays, 66 yards, 9:23.
- 3rd Quarter
  - No Scoring Plays
- 4th Quarter
  - IND – Robert Mathis 37 yard fumble return (Vinatieri kick), 9:55. Colts 10–6.

=== Week 14: vs. Cincinnati Bengals ===
Quarter	1	2	3	4	Total
Bengals	0	3	0	0	3
Colts	7	7	14	7	35

at Lucas Oil Stadium, Indianapolis, Indiana

- Game time: 1:00 pm EST
- Game weather: Game played indoors (Roof closed)
- Game attendance: 66,402
- Referee: Jeff Triplette
- TV announcers (CBS): Ian Eagle and Solomon Wilcots

With a low-scoring road win over the Browns behind them, the Colts went home for a Week 14 game with the Cincinnati Bengals. In the first quarter, Indy got the early lead as RB Dominic Rhodes got a 17-yard touchdown run. The Bengals would answer in the second quarter with kicker Shayne Graham nailing a 19-yard field goal, yet Indianapolis replied with QB Peyton Manning completing a 5-yard TD pass to WR Marvin Harrison. Manning would even deliver two third-quarter scores for the Colts, as he completed a 2-yard touchdown pass to wide receiver Anthony Gonzalez and a 4-yard touchdown pass to TE Dallas Clark. Indianapolis closed out the game with CB Kelvin Hayden returning an interception 85 yards for a touchdown.

With their win, the Colts improved to 9–4.

Scoring Summary

- 1st Quarter
  - IND – Dominic Rhodes 17 yard run (Vinatieri kick), 0:44. Colts 7–0. Drive: 9 plays, 79 yards, 4:58.
- 2nd Quarter
  - CIN – Shayne Graham 19 yard field goal, 6:11. Colts 7–3. Drive: 8 plays, 78 yards, 4:16.
  - IND – Marvin Harrison 5 yard pass from Peyton Manning (Vinatieri kick), 0:34. Colts 14–3. Drive: 2 plays, 7 yards, 0:32.
- 3rd Quarter
  - IND – Anthony Gonzalez 2 yard pass from Peyton Manning (Vinatieri kick), 6:22. Colts 21–3. Drive: 15 plays, 81 yards, 8:45.
  - IND – Dallas Clark 4 yard pass from Peyton Manning (Vinatieri kick), 2:26. Colts 28–3. Drive: 3 plays, 69 yards, 1:29.
- 4th Quarter
  - IND – Kelvin Hayden 85 yard interception return (Vinatieri kick), 5:15. Colts 35–3.

=== Week 15: vs. Detroit Lions ===
Quarter	1	2	3	4	Total
Lions	3	7	3	8	21
Colts	7	14	0	10	31

at Lucas Oil Stadium, Indianapolis, Indiana

- Game time: 1:00 pm EST
- Game weather: Game played indoors (Roof closed)
- Game attendance: 66,281
- Referee: Pete Morelli
- TV announcers (Fox): Thom Brennaman and Brian Billick

Coming off their win over the Bengals, the Colts stayed at home for their Week 15 interconference game with the winless Detroit Lions. Indianapolis delivered the game's opening hit in the first quarter as running back Dominic Rhodes got a 1-yard touchdown run. The Lions would respond with a 51-yard field goal from kicker Jason Hanson. The Colts would add onto their lead in the second quarter as rookie running back Chad Simpson got a 2-yard touchdown run, yet Detroit answered with quarterback Dan Orlovsky completing a 33-yard touchdown pass to wide receiver Calvin Johnson. Indianapolis would close out the half quarterback Peyton Manning completing a 3-yard touchdown pass to tight end Dallas Clark.

The Lions would begin to catch up in the third quarter as Hanson got a 30-yard field goal. In the fourth quarter, Detroit tied the game with running back Kevin Smith getting a 1-yard touchdown run, followed by Orlovsky's 2-point conversion pass to tight end Casey FitzSimmons. The Colts would pull away with Rhodes getting another 1-yard touchdown run, followed by kicker Adam Vinatieri nailing a 31-yard field goal.

With the win, Indianapolis improved to 10–4.

Scoring Summary

- 1st Quarter
  - IND – Dominic Rhodes 1 yard run (Vinatieri kick), 7:41. Colts 7–0. Drive: 14 plays, 78 yards, 7:22.
  - DET – Jason Hanson 51 yard field goal, 4:50. Colts 7–3. Drive: 4 plays, 3 yards, 1:15.
- 2nd Quarter
  - IND – Chad Simpson 2 yard run (Vinatieri kick), 5:34. Colts 14–3. Drive: 9 plays, 56 yards, 3:13.
  - DET – Calvin Johnson 33 yard pass from Dan Orlovsky (Hanson kick), 3:42. Colts 14–10. Drive: 3 plays, 69 yards, 1:53.
  - IND – Dallas Clark 3 yard pass from Peyton Manning (Vinatieri kick), 0:53. Colts 21–10. Drive: 8 plays, 78 yards, 2:49.
- 3rd Quarter
  - DET – Jason Hanson 30 yard field goal, 10:04. Colts 21–13. Drive: 6 plays, 10 yards, 2:15.
- 4th Quarter
  - DET – Kevin Smith 1 yard run (Orlovsky to FitzSimmons), 12:58. Tied 21–21. Drive: 13 plays, 91 yards, 7:39.
  - IND – Dominic Rhodes 1 yard run (Vinatieri kick), 8:43. Colts 28–21. Drive: 7 plays, 88 yards, 4:13.
  - IND – Adam Vinatieri 31 yard field goal, 0:44. Colts 31–21. Drive: 11 plays, 67 yards, 4:42.

=== Week 16: at Jacksonville Jaguars ===
Quarter	1	2	3	4	Total
Colts	0	7	7	17	31
Jaguars	7	10	7	0	24

at Jacksonville Municipal Stadium, Jacksonville, Florida

- Game time: 8:15 pm EST
- Game weather: 66 °F (19 °C) (Clear)
- Game attendance: 65,648
- Referee: Walt Anderson
- TV announcers (NFL): Bob Papa and Cris Collinsworth

Coming off their home win over the Lions, the Colts flew to Jacksonville Municipal Stadium for a Week 16 AFC South rematch with the Jacksonville Jaguars on Thursday night. Indianapolis trailed early in the first quarter as Jaguars David Garrard completed a 28-yard touchdown pass to wide receiver Dennis Northcutt. In the second quarter, the Colts' deficit increased to 14 points as Garrard scored on a 2-yard touchdown run. Indianapolis responded with quarterback Peyton Manning's 41-yard touchdown pass to wide receiver Reggie Wayne. The Colts had an opportunity to cut the Jacksonville lead to 4, but Adam Vinatieri missed a 30-yard field goal. The scoreless Colts possession left 1:03 on the clock, enough time to enable Jacksonville to close out the half with a 44-yard field goal from kicker Josh Scobee.

The Colts would hack at the Jaguars' lead in the third quarter with Manning's 10-yard touchdown pass to running back Dominic Rhodes, yet Jacksonville answered with running back Montell Owens to take a 24–14 lead. In the fourth quarter, Indianapolis took the lead on the following scores: Manning's 1-yard touchdown pass to tight end Dallas Clark, kicker Adam Vinatieri's 45-yard field goal, and defensive back Keiwan Ratliff's 35-yard interception return for a touchdown. The Jaguars would get a late-game drive into Colts' territory, yet defensive end Dwight Freeney delivered the game-winning sack, preserving Indianapolis' slim lead.

With the win, not only did the Colts improve to 11–4, but they also clinched the AFC's No. 5 seed. They also gave head coach Tony Dungy his 10th-straight playoff appearance (an NFL record).

Scoring Summary

- 1st Quarter
  - JAC – Dennis Northcutt 28 yard pass from David Garrard (Scobee kick), 11:05. Jaguars 7–0. Drive: 8 plays, 62 yards, 4:01.
- 2nd Quarter
  - JAC – David Garrard 2 yard run (Scobee kick), 11:43. Jaguars 14–0. Drive: 17 plays, 93 yards, 9:35.
  - IND – Reggie Wayne 41 yard pass from Peyton Manning (Vinatieri kick), 8:46. Jaguars 14–7. Drive: 5 plays, 63 yards, 2:58.
  - JAC – Josh Scobee 44 yard field goal, 0:06. Jaguars 17–7. Drive: 8 plays, 54 yards, 1:02.
- 3rd Quarter
  - IND – Dominic Rhodes 10 yard pass from Peyton Manning (Vinatieri kick), 10:32. Jaguars 17–14. Drive: 9 plays, 75 yards, 4:34.
  - JAC – Montell Owens 2 yard run (Scobee kick), 2:33. Jaguars 24–14. Drive: 14 plays, 76 yards, 7:58.
- 4th Quarter
  - IND – Dallas Clark 1 yard pass from Peyton Manning (Vinatieri kick), 12:36. Jaguars 24–21. Drive: 11 plays, 81 yards, 4:57.
  - IND – Adam Vinatieri 45 yard field goal, 6:34. Tied 24–24. Drive: 10 plays, 52 yards, 4:55.
  - IND – Keiwan Ratliff 35 yard interception return (Vinatieri kick), 4:58. Colts 31–24.

=== Week 17: vs. Tennessee Titans ===
Quarter	1	2	3	4	Total
Titans	0	0	0	0	0
Colts	10	6	0	7	23

at Lucas Oil Stadium, Indianapolis, Indiana

- Game time: 1:00 pm EST
- Game weather: Game played indoors (Roof closed)
- Game attendance: 66,721
- Referee: Tony Corrente
- TV announcers (CBS): Ian Eagle and Solomon Wilcots

Coming off their playoff-clinching road win over the Jaguars, the Colts closed out the regular season at home in a Week 17 AFC South rematch with the Tennessee Titans. The Titans, having already clinched the number one seed in the AFC and having home-field advantage, only played second- and third-string players for the entirety of the game. Indianapolis would get the early first quarter lead as quarterback Peyton Manning completed a 55-yard touchdown pass to running back Joseph Addai, followed by kicker Adam Vinatieri getting a 28-yard field goal. The Colts would increase their lead in the second quarter as Vinatieri nailed a 21-yard and a 38-yard field goal. After a scoreless third quarter, Indianapolis closed out the game in the fourth quarter as center Jamey Richard recovered rookie running back Lance Ball's fumble in the endzone for a touchdown.

With the shutout win, the Colts closed out the regular season at 12–4 and captured the AFC's #5 seed and also their 6th straight season with 12+ wins.

Peyton Manning (7–7 for 95 yards, 1 touchdown) would acquire his NFL record ninth-straight 4,000-yard passing season, wide receiver Marvin Harrison (7 receptions for 31 yards) would pass Cris Carter for second on the NFL's all-time career receptions list with 1,102, and tight end Dallas Clark (6 receptions for 59 yards) would set a franchise record for the most single-season receiving yards by a tight end with 848.

Scoring Summary

- 1st Quarter
  - IND – Joseph Addai 55 yard pass from Peyton Manning (Vinatieri kick), 9:24. Colts 7–0. Drive: 9 plays, 90 yards, 5:48.
  - IND – Adam Vinatieri 28 yard field goal, 0:20. Colts 10–0. Drive: 14 plays, 70 yards, 7:18.
- 2nd Quarter
  - IND – Adam Vinatieri 21 yard field goal, 10:19. Colts 13–0. Drive: 10 plays, 51 yards, 5:02.
  - IND – Adam Vinatieri 38 yard field goal, 2:31. Colts 16–0. Drive: 12 plays, 42 yards, 5:53.
- 3rd Quarter
  - No Scoring Plays
- 4th Quarter
  - IND – Jamey Richard fumble recovery in the endzone (Vinatieri kick), 6:48. Colts 23–0. Drive: 6 plays, 60 yards, 3:48.

== Postseason schedule ==
Week	Date	Kickoff	Opponent (seed)	Result	Record	Game site	TV	NFL Recap
Wild Card	January 3, 2009	8:15 pm EST	at San Diego Chargers (4)	17–23 (OT)	12–5	Qualcomm Stadium	NBC	Recap

== Postseason results ==
=== AFC Wild Card: at San Diego Chargers ===
Quarter	1	2	3	4	OT	Total
Colts	7	3	7	0	0	17
Chargers	0	14	0	3	6	23

at Qualcomm Stadium, San Diego, California

- Game time: 5:15 pm PST/8:15 pm EST
- Game weather: 53 °F (12 °C) (Cloudy)
- Game attendance: 68,082
- Referee: Ron Winter
- TV announcers (NBC): Al Michaels (play by play), John Madden (color commentator), & Andrea Kremer (sideline reporter)

Entering the postseason as the AFC's fifth seed, the Colts began their playoff run at Qualcomm Stadium in the AFC's Wild Card game against the No. 4 San Diego Chargers, in a rematch of their Week 12 contest. Indianapolis got the lead in the first quarter as running back Joseph Addai got a 1-yard touchdown run. The Chargers would strike back in the second quarter as running back LaDainian Tomlinson got a 3-yard touchdown run. The Colts would answer with kicker Adam Vinatieri's 43-yard field goal, yet San Diego got the halftime lead with running back Darren Sproles getting a 9-yard touchdown run.

Indianapolis would regain the lead in the third quarter as league MVP/quarterback Peyton Manning completed a 72-yard touchdown pass to wide receiver Reggie Wayne, but the Chargers would tie the game in the fourth quarter as kicker Nate Kaeding nailed a 22-yard field goal. Afterwards, in overtime, the Colts would never get the ball as San Diego took the period's first drive and capped it off with Sproles' game-ending 22-yard touchdown run. This would be the second straight time the Chargers beat the Colts in a playoff game.

With the loss, Indianapolis' season would end with an overall record of 12–5.

== Individual accomplishments ==
- On January 2, 2009, Peyton Manning was awarded his third Associated Press NFL MVP award.

== See also ==
- History of the Indianapolis Colts
- Indianapolis Colts seasons
- Colts–Patriots rivalry
