= 2003–04 NFL playoffs =

American football tournament

- Dates: January 3–February 1, 2004
- Season: 2003
- Teams: 12
- Games played: 11
- Super Bowl XXXVIII site: Reliant Stadium; Houston, Texas
- Defending champions: Tampa Bay Buccaneers (did not qualify)
- Champion: New England Patriots (2nd title)
- Runner-up: Carolina Panthers
- Conference runners-up: Indianapolis Colts; Philadelphia Eagles
NFL playoffs
← 2002–03	2004–05 →

The National Football League playoffs for the 2003 season began on January 3, 2004. The postseason tournament concluded with the New England Patriots defeating the Carolina Panthers in Super Bowl XXXVIII, 32–29, on February 1, at Reliant Stadium in Houston, Texas.

Beginning with the 2003–04 season, the NFL changed the selection procedures regarding officials for playoff games. The league suspended the prior practice of assembling "all-star" officiating crews of highly rated individual officials. Instead, the league began using the entire crews that were highest rated during the regular season, preserving familiarity and cohesiveness in the officiating. The "all-star" crews were later resumed, beginning with the 2005–06 Conference Championships.

== Participants ==
Within each conference, the four division winners and the top two non-division winners with the best overall regular season records) qualified for the playoffs. The four division winners are seeded 1–4 based on their overall won-lost-tied record, and the wild card teams are seeded 5–6. The NFL does not use a fixed bracket playoff system, and there are no restrictions regarding teams from the same division matching up in any round. In the first round, dubbed the wild-card playoffs or wild-card weekend, the third-seeded division winner hosts the sixth-seed wild card, and the fourth seed hosts the fifth. The 1 and 2 seeds from each conference received a first-round bye. In the second round, the divisional playoffs, the number 1 seed hosts the worst-surviving seed from the first round (seed 4, 5, or 6), while the number 2 seed will play the other team (seed 3, 4, or 5). The two surviving teams from each conference's divisional playoff games met in the respective AFC and NFC Conference Championship games, hosted by the higher seed. Although the Super Bowl, the championship round of the playoffs, is played at a neutral site, the designated home team is based on an annual rotation by conference.

Playoff seeds
Seed	AFC	NFC
1	New England Patriots (East winner)	Philadelphia Eagles (East winner)
2	Kansas City Chiefs (West winner)	St. Louis Rams (West winner)
3	Indianapolis Colts (South winner)	Carolina Panthers (South winner)
4	Baltimore Ravens (North winner)	Green Bay Packers (North winner)
5	Tennessee Titans (wild card)	Seattle Seahawks (wild card)
6	Denver Broncos (wild card)	Dallas Cowboys (wild card)

== Bracket ==
Jan 3 – Bank of America Stadium	Jan 10 – Edward Jones Dome
6	Dallas	10
3	Carolina	29**
3	Carolina	29	Jan 18 – Lincoln Financial Field
2	St. Louis	23
NFC
Jan 4 – Lambeau Field	3	Carolina	14
Jan 11 – Lincoln Financial Field
1	Philadelphia	3
5	Seattle	27	NFC Championship
4	Green Bay	17
4	Green Bay	33*	Feb 1 – Reliant Stadium
1	Philadelphia	20*
Wild Card playoffs
Divisional playoffs
Jan 4 – RCA Dome	N3	Carolina	29
Jan 11 – Arrowhead Stadium
A1	New England	32
6	Denver	10	Super Bowl XXXVIII
3	Indianapolis	38
3	Indianapolis	41	Jan 18 – Gillette Stadium
2	Kansas City	31
AFC
Jan 3 – M&T Bank Stadium	3	Indianapolis	14
Jan 10 – Gillette Stadium
1	New England	24
5	Tennessee	20	AFC Championship
5	Tennessee	14
4	Baltimore	17
1	New England	17

* Indicates OT periods

== Schedule ==
In the United States, ABC broadcast the first two Wild Card playoff games. Fox then televised the rest of the NFC games. CBS broadcast the rest of the AFC playoff games and Super Bowl XXXVIII.

Round	Away team	Score	Home team	Date	Kickoff (ET / UTC−5)	TV
Wild-card round	Tennessee Titans	20–17	Baltimore Ravens	January 3, 2004	4:30 p.m.	ABC
Wild-card round	Dallas Cowboys	10–29	Carolina Panthers	January 3, 2004	8:00 p.m.	ABC
Wild-card round	Seattle Seahawks	27–33 (OT)	Green Bay Packers	January 4, 2004	1:00 p.m.	Fox
Wild-card round	Denver Broncos	10–41	Indianapolis Colts	January 4, 2004	4:30 p.m.	CBS
Divisional round	Carolina Panthers	29–23 (2OT)	St. Louis Rams	January 10, 2004	4:30 p.m.	Fox
Divisional round	Tennessee Titans	14–17	New England Patriots	January 10, 2004	8:00 p.m.	CBS
Divisional round	Indianapolis Colts	38–31	Kansas City Chiefs	January 11, 2004	1:00 p.m.	CBS
Divisional round	Green Bay Packers	17–20 (OT)	Philadelphia Eagles	January 11, 2004	4:30 p.m.	Fox
Conference championships	Indianapolis Colts	14–24	New England Patriots	January 18, 2004	3:00 p.m.	CBS
Conference championships	Carolina Panthers	14–3	Philadelphia Eagles	January 18, 2004	6:30 p.m.	Fox
Super Bowl XXXVIII Reliant Stadium Houston, Texas	Carolina Panthers	29–32	New England Patriots	February 1, 2004	6:30 p.m.	CBS

== Wild-card round ==
=== Saturday, January 3, 2004 ===
==== AFC: Tennessee Titans 20, Baltimore Ravens 17 ====
Tennessee Titans vs. Baltimore Ravens – Game summary

Quarter	1	2	3	4	Total
Titans	7	0	7	6	20
Ravens	7	3	0	7	17

at M&T Bank Stadium, Baltimore, Maryland

- Game time: 4:30 p.m. EST
- Game weather: 43 °F (6 °C), fair
- Game attendance: 69,452
- Referee: Jeff Triplette
- TV announcers (ABC): Mike Patrick (play-by-play), Joe Theismann, Paul Maguire (color commentators), and Suzy Kolber (sideline reporter)

Game information

First quarter

- TEN – Chris Brown 6-yard run (Gary Anderson kick) 8:54. Titans 7–0. Drive: 10 plays, 67 yards, 5:03.
- BAL – Will Demps 56-yard interception return (Matt Stover kick), 6:12. Tied 7–7.

Second quarter

- BAL – Matt Stover 43-yard field goal, 1:55. Ravens 10–7. Drive: 9 plays, 55 yards, 4:23.

Third quarter

- TEN – Justin McCareins 49-yard pass from Steve McNair (Gary Anderson kick), 7:59. Titans 14–10. Drive: 6 plays, 79 yards, 3:16.

Fourth quarter

- TEN – Gary Anderson 45-yard field goal, 9:13. Titans 17–10. Drive: 4 plays, 3 yards, 2:20.
- BAL – Todd Heap 35-yard pass from Anthony Wright (Matt Stover kick), 4:30. Tied 17–17. Drive: 9 plays, 71 yards, 4:43.
- TEN – Gary Anderson 46-yard field goal, 0:29. Titans 20–17. Drive: 8 plays, 35 yards, 2:15.

Top passers

- TEN – Steve McNair – 14/23, 159 yards, TD, 3 INT
- BAL – Anthony Wright – 20/37, 214 yards, TD, 2 INT

Top rushers

- TEN – Eddie George – 25 rushes, 88 yards
- BAL – Jamal Lewis – 14 rushes, 35 yards

Top receivers

- TEN – Justin McCareins – 2 receptions, 62 yards, TD
- BAL – Travis Taylor – 7 receptions, 82 yards

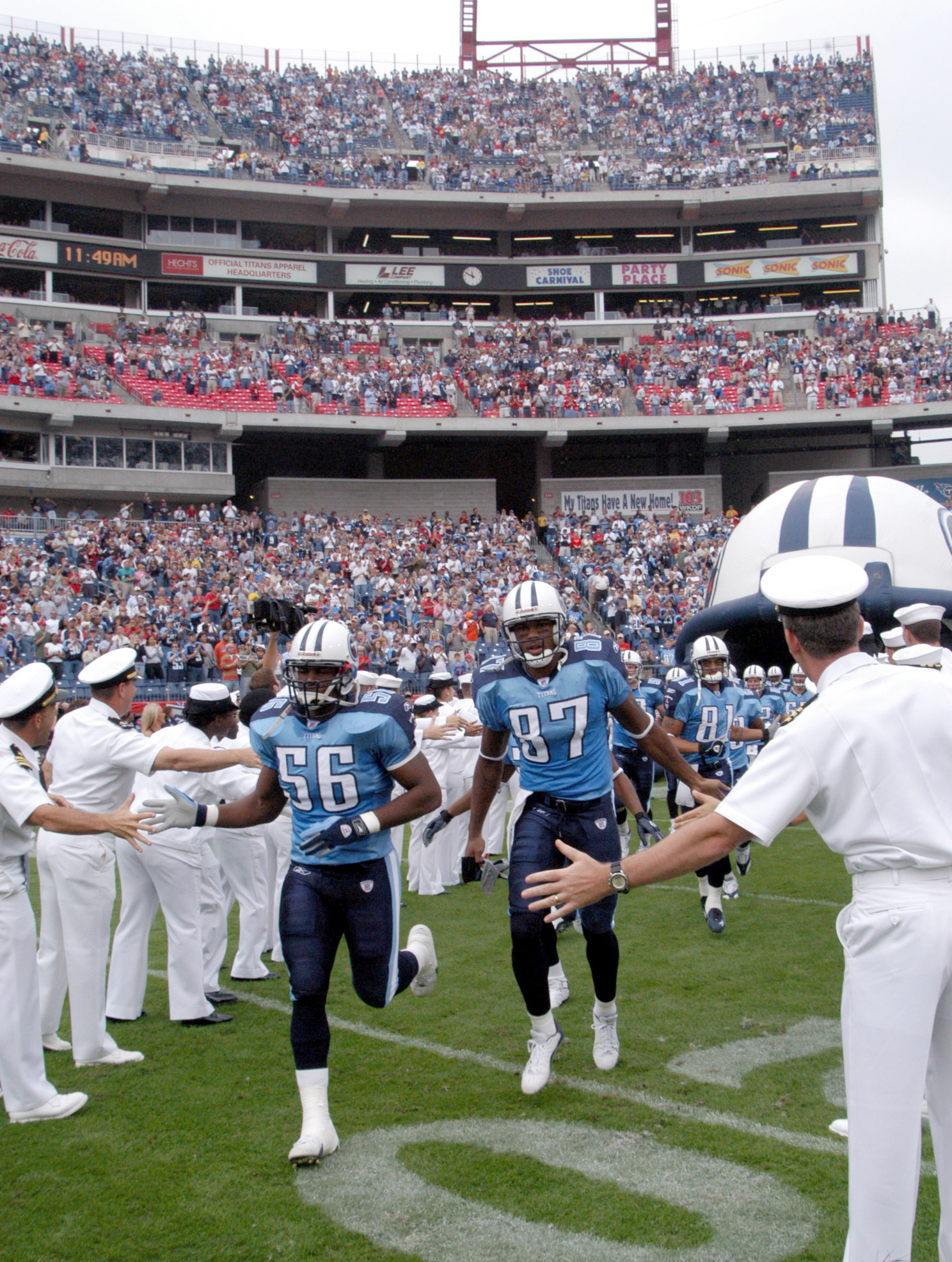
Tennessee's team is welcomed on to the field against Houston in week 6 of the 2003 season

In a defensive struggle, Gary Anderson kicked the winning 46-yard field goal for the Titans with 29 seconds left. The winning kick was set up after a 15-yard unnecessary roughness penalty on Ravens offensive tackle Orlando Brown Sr. forced the Ravens to punt and enabled the Titans to start their final drive from their own 37-yard line. Titans quarterback Steve McNair threw three interceptions. Meanwhile, the Ravens running back Jamal Lewis, the league's regular season rushing leader, was limited to 35 yards on 14 carries.

On the Titans' opening drive of the game, McNair completed passes to Drew Bennett and Frank Wycheck for gains of 17 and 14 yards, while Eddie George rushed five times for 25 yards on a 10-play, 67-yard drive. Running back Chris Brown finished the drive with a 6-yard touchdown run to give the Titans a 7–0 lead. The Ravens were forced to punt on their ensuing drive, but three plays later, safety Ed Reed tipped a pass from McNair into the arms of cornerback Will Demps, who returned it 56 yards for a touchdown.

Early in the second quarter, a 15-yard punt return from Titans wide receiver Derrick Mason gave his team the ball at the Ravens 35-yard line. McNair then led them to the 17-yard line, but Reed intercepted a pass from him and returned it 23 yards to the 29. After an exchange of punts, Ravens quarterback Anthony Wright completed four passes for 56 yards and rushed for 11, setting up a 43-yard field goal by Matt Stover giving the Ravens a 10–7 halftime lead.

Midway through the third quarter, McNair's 49-yard touchdown pass to Justin McCareins gave the Titans a 14–10 lead. Then in the fourth quarter, Titans cornerback Samari Rolle intercepted a pass from Wright at the Ravens' 30-yard line, setting up a 45-yard field goal from Anderson. But Wright led the Ravens back, completing five passes for 80 yards on their ensuing drive. Tight end Todd Heap caught three of Wright's passes for 55 yards, and finished the drive with a leaping 35-yard catch in the back of the end zone to tie the game.

After an exchange of punts, the Titans took the ball on their own 37-yard line and drove 35 yards to Ravens' 28-yard line where Anderson's 46-yard field goal with 33 seconds left gave them the win. This would be the Titans' last playoff win until 2017.

This was the second postseason meeting between the Titans and Ravens. The Ravens won the only previous meeting.

Previous playoff games
Baltimore leads 1–0 in all-time playoff games

2000

Baltimore Ravens 24 @ Tennessee Titans 10

2000 AFC Divisional playoffs

==== NFC: Carolina Panthers 29, Dallas Cowboys 10 ====
Dallas Cowboys vs. Carolina Panthers – Game summary

Quarter	1	2	3	4	Total
Cowboys	0	3	0	7	10
Panthers	6	10	7	6	29

at Ericsson Stadium, Charlotte, North Carolina

- Game time: 8:00 p.m. EST
- Game weather: 63 °F (17 °C), partly cloudy
- Game attendance: 73,014
- Referee: Walt Coleman
- TV announcers (ABC): Al Michaels (play-by-play), John Madden (color commentator), and Lisa Guerrero (sideline reporter)

Game information

First quarter

- CAR – John Kasay 18-yard field goal, 8:40. Panthers 3–0. Drive: 7 plays, 77 yards, 3:47.
- CAR – John Kasay 38-yard field goal, 1:02. Panthers 6–0. Drive: 7 plays, 21 yards, 1:57.

Second quarter

- CAR – Stephen Davis 23-yard run (John Kasay kick), 6:10. Panthers 13–0. Drive: 8 plays, 51 yards, 3:49.
- DAL – Billy Cundiff 37-yard field goal, 1:12. Panthers 13–3. Drive: 10 plays, 59 yards, 4:58.
- CAR – John Kasay 19-yard field goal, 0:01. Panthers 16–3. Drive: 6 plays, 71 yards, 1:11.

Third quarter

- CAR – Steve Smith 32-yard pass from Jake Delhomme (John Kasay kick), 9:44. Panthers 23–3. Drive: 4 plays, 63 yards, 1:28.

Fourth quarter

- CAR – John Kasay 32-yard field goal, 12:45. Panthers 26–3. Drive: 10 plays, 46 yards, 5:43.
- DAL – Quincy Carter 9-yard run (Billy Cundiff kick), 7:36. Panthers 26–10. Drive: 9 plays, 47 yards, 5:09.
- CAR – John Kasay 34-yard field goal, 3:12. Panthers 29–10. Drive: 4 plays, –5 yards, 1:47.

Top passers

- DAL – Quincy Carter – 21/36, 154 yards, INT
- CAR – Jake Delhomme – 18/29, 273 yards, TD

Top rushers

- DAL – Troy Hambrick – 8 rushes, 29 yards
- CAR – Stephen Davis – 26 rushes, 104 yards, TD

Top receivers

- DAL – Joey Galloway – 4 receptions, 59 yards
- CAR – Steve Smith – 5 receptions, 135 yards, TD

The Cowboys' turnaround season under head coach Bill Parcells came to a crashing halt. The Panthers outgained the Cowboys in total yards 380–204 and held the ball for 34:23. Cowboys quarterback Quincy Carter threw for only 154 yards and an interception, while being sacked three times. Meanwhile, Panthers quarterback Jake Delhomme threw for 273 yards and a touchdown to Steve Smith, who had five receptions for 135 yards and added 22 return yards on special teams. Stephen Davis ran for 104 yards and another touchdown, while Muhsin Muhammad caught four passes for 103 yards. John Kasay kicked five field goals for the Panthers.

On the Panthers' third play of the game, Delhomme completed a 70-yard pass to Smith on the Cowboys' 1-yard line, setting up Kasay's first field goal. Later in the first quarter, Toby Gowin's 31-yard punt gave the Panthers the ball at the Cowboys' 41-yard line, and the Panthers scored another field goal to take a 6–0 lead. On the Cowboys' ensuing drive, Carter completed a 28-yard pass to Joey Galloway and Troy Hambrick ran for 16 yards, giving the Cowboys a first down at the Panthers' 20-yard line. But two plays later, fullback Richie Anderson fumbled the ball and Panthers safety Mike Minter recovered it.

Later in the second quarter, Gowin once again gave the Panthers great field position with a 17-yard punt to the Panthers' 49-yard line, and this time they managed to get the ball into the end zone with a 23-yard touchdown run by Davis, giving the Panthers a 13–0 lead. Carter managed to respond on the Cowboys' ensuing drive, completing an 18-yard pass to Galloway, a 21-yard pass to Terry Glenn, and a 12-yard pass to Anderson. Billy Cundiff finished the drive with a 37-yard field goal to cut the score to 13–3 with 1:03 left in the second quarter. But after the ensuing kickoff, Delhomme's 57-yard completion to Muhammad set up Kasay's third field goal on the last play of the half.

The Panthers continued to dominate the game in the second half. Smith returned a Gowin punt seven yards to the Panthers' 37-yard line. Then after a 24-yard reception by Muhammad, he caught a 7-yard pass and capped the drive with a 32-yard touchdown catch. Later on, he returned a punt to his own 40-yard line, setting up a 38-yard drive that ended with Kasay's fourth field goal, increasing the Panthers lead to 26–3.

Cowboys receiver Michael Bates returned the ensuing kickoff 41 yards to the Panthers 47-yard line, sparking a desperate rally. Carter then completed six consecutive passes and finished the drive with a 9-yard touchdown run, cutting the score to 26–10. The Cowboys' defense managed to force a punt on the Panthers' next drive, but two plays later, Julius Peppers intercepted a screen pass from Carter and returned it 34 yards to the Cowboys' 11-yard line. Four plays later, Kasay kicked his fifth field goal with 3:04 left in the game to close out the scoring.

This was the second postseason meeting between the Cowboys and Panthers. The Panthers won the only previous meeting.

Previous playoff games
Carolina leads 1–0 in all-time playoff games

1996

Dallas Cowboys 17 @ Carolina Panthers 26

1996 NFC Divisional playoffs

=== Sunday, January 4, 2004 ===
==== NFC: Green Bay Packers 33, Seattle Seahawks 27 (OT) ====
Seattle Seahawks vs. Green Bay Packers – Game summary

Quarter	1	2	3	4	OT	Total
Seahawks	3	3	14	7	0	27
Packers	0	13	0	14	6	33

at Lambeau Field, Green Bay, Wisconsin

- Game time: 1:00 p.m. EST/12:00 p.m. CST
- Game weather: 20 °F (−7 °C), cloudy
- Game attendance: 71,457
- Referee: Bernie Kukar
- TV announcers (Fox): Joe Buck (play-by-play), Troy Aikman, Cris Collinsworth (color commentators), and Chris Myers (sideline reporter)

Game information

First quarter

- SEA – Josh Brown 30-yard field goal, 7:01. Seahawks 3–0. Drive: 10 plays, 57 yards, 4:53.

Second quarter

- GB – Ryan Longwell 31-yard field goal, 9:13. Tied 3–3. Drive: 5 plays, 37 yards, 2:01.
- SEA – Josh Brown 35-yard field goal, 6:50. Seahawks 6–3. Drive: 8 plays, 51 yards, 2:23.
- GB – Bubba Franks 23-yard pass from Brett Favre (Ryan Longwell kick), 4:37. Packers 10–6. Drive: 5 plays, 80 yards, 2:13.
- GB – Ryan Longwell 27-yard field goal, 0:46. Packers 13–6. Drive: 6 plays, 30 yards, 1:32.

Third quarter

- SEA – Shaun Alexander 1-yard run (Josh Brown kick), 9:28. Tied 13–13. Drive: 10 plays, 74 yards, 5:32.
- SEA – Shaun Alexander 1-yard run (Josh Brown kick), 1:57. Seahawks 20–13. Drive: 11 plays, 77 yards, 4:57.

Fourth quarter

- GB – Ahman Green 1-yard run (Ryan Longwell kick), 10:01. Tied 20–20. Drive: 12 plays, 60 yards, 6:56.
- GB – Ahman Green 1-yard run (Ryan Longwell kick), 2:44. Packers 27–20. Drive: 12 plays, 51 yards, 6:46.
- SEA – Shaun Alexander 1-yard run (Josh Brown kick), 0:51. Tied 27–27. Drive: 7 plays, 67 yards, 1:53.

Overtime

- GB – Al Harris 52-yard interception return, 10:35. Packers 33–27.

Top passers

- SEA – Matt Hasselbeck – 25/45, 305 yards, INT
- GB – Brett Favre – 26/38, 319 yards, TD

Top rushers

- SEA – Shaun Alexander – 20 rushes, 45 yards, 3 TD
- GB – Ahman Green – 23 rushes, 66 yards, 2 TD

Top receivers

- SEA – Koren Robinson – 7 receptions, 88 yards
- GB – Javon Walker – 5 receptions, 111 yards

Packers cornerback Al Harris returned an interception 52 yards for the game-winning touchdown 4:25 into overtime, making this the first playoff game ever to be won in overtime with a defensive touchdown. The game is memorable for Seahawks quarterback Matt Hasselbeck's ironic comment after winning the coin toss for the start of overtime, telling the microphoned referee, and thus the crowd at Lambeau Field and the national television audience, "We want the ball, and we're going to score."

After forcing a punt, the Seahawks scored on their opening drive, with Hasselbeck completing two passes to Koren Robinson for 25 yards and Shaun Alexander rushing for 22 on the way to a 30-yard field goal by Josh Brown. In the second quarter, Tom Rouen's 38-yard punt gave the Packers the ball at midfield. Packers quarterback Brett Favre then completed a 29-yard pass to fullback William Henderson to set up a 31-yard field goal from Ryan Longwell. The Seahawks came back with a 51-yard drive, featuring a 28-yard reception by Bobby Engram, and scored another Brown field goal to retake the lead. But on the first play of the Packers' ensuing drive, Favre completed a 44-yard pass to Javon Walker. Then after a 13-yard run from Ahman Green, Favre threw a 23-yard touchdown pass to tight end Bubba Franks. The Seahawks were forced to punt from their own 7 on their next drive, and receiver Antonio Chatman returned the ball six yards to the Seahawks' 39-yard line. Two plays later, Favre's 23-yard completion to Donald Driver set up Longwell's 27-yard field goal with 41 seconds left in the half, giving the Packers a 13–6 lead.

The Seahawks took the second half kickoff and stormed down the field, driving 74 yards in 10 plays. Hasselbeck started out the drive with a 25-yard pass to Darrell Jackson, followed it up with a 15-yard completion to Itula Mili, and later completed a 14-yard pass to Mili. Alexander finished the drive with a 1-yard touchdown run on fourth down to tie the game. Then after forcing a punt, Hasselbeck completed five of seven passes for 72 yards, including a 33-yard pass to Robinson, and Alexander scored with another 1-yard touchdown run to give the Seahawks a 20–13 lead. Packers fullback Nick Luchey returned the ensuing kickoff 12 yards to his own 40-yard line, and Favre subsequently led the Packers 60 yards in 11 plays, taking over seven minutes off the clock. At the end of the drive, Green's 1-yard touchdown run tied the game with 9:56 left in the fourth quarter.

The Seahawks went three and out on their next drive, and Chatman returned Rouen's punt 21 yards to the Seahawks' 49-yard line. Favre once again led the Packers on another long scoring drive, moving the ball 49 yards in 12 plays and consuming 6:51 off the clock. Green finished the drive with another 1-yard touchdown run, and Longwell's extra point gave the Packers a 27–20 lead with 2:39 left in regulation. But Hasslbeck responded by completing three of five passes for 59 yards, including a 34-yard pass to Engram, on the way to Alexander's third 1-yard touchdown run to tie the game. Favre's 27-yard completion to Walker on the Packers ensuing drive gave them a chance to win, but Longwell missed a 47-yard field goal attempt on the last play of regulation, and it went into overtime.

After the Seahawks won the overtime coin flip, Hasselbeck inadvertently spoke into the referee's microphone, "We want the ball and we're gonna score!" After both teams went 3 and out on their first drives of the extra period, the Seahawks drove to their own 45-yard line before Harris intercepted Hasselbeck's pass and returned it 52 yards for the winning touchdown.

Favre completed 26 of 38 passes for 319 yards (his second highest post season total) and a touchdown. This was his 14th consecutive playoff game with a touchdown pass, a playoff record. Walker caught five passes for 111 yards. This would be the final game for John Randle in his Hall of Fame career.

This was the first postseason meeting between the Seahawks and Packers.

==== AFC: Indianapolis Colts 41, Denver Broncos 10 ====
Denver Broncos vs. Indianapolis Colts – Game summary

Quarter	1	2	3	4	Total
Broncos	3	0	0	7	10
Colts	14	17	10	0	41

at RCA Dome, Indianapolis, Indiana

- Game time: 4:30 p.m. EST
- Game weather: Played indoors, domed stadium
- Game attendance: 56,586
- Referee: Johnny Grier
- TV announcers (CBS): Greg Gumbel (play-by-play), Phil Simms (color commentator), and Armen Keteyian (sideline reporter)

Game information

First quarter

- IND – Brandon Stokley 31-yard pass from Peyton Manning (Mike Vanderjagt kick), 11:55. Colts 7–0. Drive: 6 plays, 70 yards, 3:05.
- DEN – Jason Elam 49-yard field goal, 3:41. Colts 7–3. Drive: 12 plays, 47 yards, 8:14.
- IND – Marvin Harrison 46-yard pass from Peyton Manning (Mike Vanderjagt kick), 0:24. Colts 14–3. Drive: 8 plays, 81 yards, 3:17.

Second quarter

- IND – Marvin Harrison 23-yard pass from Peyton Manning (Mike Vanderjagt kick), 7:28. Colts 21–3. Drive: 8 plays, 80 yards, 3:49.
- IND – Brandon Stokley 87-yard pass from Peyton Manning (Mike Vanderjagt kick), 1:51. Colts 28–3. Drive: 1 play, 87 yards, 0:10.
- IND – Mike Vanderjagt 27-yard field goal, 0:00. Colts 31–3. Drive: 6 plays, 49 yards, 0:55.

Third quarter

- IND – Reggie Wayne 7-yard pass from Peyton Manning (Mike Vanderjagt kick), 5:19. Colts 38–3. Drive: 12 plays, 64 yards, 5:45.
- IND – Mike Vanderjagt 20-yard field goal, 0:55. Colts 41–3. Drive: 6 plays, 17 yards, 3:38.

Fourth quarter

- DEN – Rod Smith 7-yard pass from Jake Plummer (Jason Elam kick), 7:04. Colts 41–10. Drive: 12 plays, 62 yards, 6:18.

Top passers

- DEN – Jake Plummer – 23/30, 181 yards, TD, 2 INT
- IND – Peyton Manning – 22/26, 377 yards, 5 TD

Top rushers

- DEN – Clinton Portis – 17 rushes, 68 yards
- IND – Edgerrin James – 17 rushes, 78 yards

Top receivers

- DEN – Rod Smith – 5 receptions, 66 yards
- IND – Brandon Stokley – 4 receptions, 144 yards, 2 TD

Colts quarterback Peyton Manning earned his first playoff victory as he completed 22 of 26 passes for 377 yards and five touchdowns, giving him a perfect passer rating of 158.3 as the Colts crushed the Broncos, scoring on every possession until running back Edgerrin James lost a fumble with 14:14 left in the fourth quarter. Manning passed for four touchdowns in the first half alone, including one to Marvin Harrison where he got up and scored after falling down untouched. Both Harrison and Brandon Stokley scored two touchdowns for the Colts, with Reggie Wayne added the fifth. Meanwhile, the Colts' defense picked off two passes from Broncos quarterback Jake Plummer and recovered a fumble. Harrison recorded a career postseason high seven receptions for 133 yards and two touchdowns, while Stokley caught four passes for 144 yards and two scores.

The Colts took the opening kickoff and stormed down the field. James gained 39 yards on the first five plays of the drive, and then Manning finished it with a 31-yard touchdown pass to Stokley. The Broncos responded on their ensuing drive, advancing the ball 49 yards in 12 plays and taking 8:13 off the clock. Jason Elam capped off the drive with a 49-yard field goal to cut their deficit to 7–3, but it was as close as the Broncos would ever get for the rest of the game. After the kickoff, Harrison caught three passes for 70 yards, including a pass in which he made a diving catch around three Broncos players. All of them thought Harrison was down by contact and started to leave the field, but no one had actually touched him, and Harrison got back up and ran 46 yards for a touchdown.

After forcing a punt, the Colts drove 80 yards in nine plays. James rushed for 17 yards on the drive, while Manning started it off with a 25-yard completion to tight end Marcus Pollard and finished it with a 23-yard touchdown pass to Harrison, giving the Colts a 21–3 lead with 11:07 left in the second quarter. The Broncos managed to move the ball to the Colts' 36-yard line on their ensuing drive, but a 15-yard penalty on guard Dan Neil pushed them out of field goal range and forced them to punt. Micah Knorr managed to pin the Colts back at their own 13-yard line with his punt, but on the first play after that, Manning threw an 87-yard touchdown pass to Stokley. Plummer's 18-yard completion to Rod Smith helped the Broncos advance to the Colts' 37-yard line on the Broncos' next possession, but then he threw an interception to cornerback David Macklin, who returned it 21 yards to the Colts' 45-yard line. After the turnover, Manning completed four passes for 48 yards, moving the ball to the Broncos' 10-yard line where Mike Vanderjagt made a 27-yard field goal on the last play of the half, giving the Colts a 31–3 halftime lead.

The Colts' defense stepped up in the third quarter, forcing three turnovers. The Broncos took the second half kickoff and drove to the Colts 23-yard line, featuring a 34-yard reception by Smith. But then Plummer was sacked on third down and Elam's 46-yard field goal attempt was blocked. After the botched field goal, the Colts drove 64 yards and scored with Manning's fifth touchdown pass, a 7-yard toss to Wayne. Three plays after the ensuing kickoff, Colts linebacker Rob Morris recovered a fumble from Plummer on the Broncos' 20-yard line, setting up a 20-yard field goal from Vanderjagt. Then four plays after the ensuing kickoff, Macklin recorded his second interception from Plummer and returned it 32 yards to the Broncos' 49-yard line.

This time, the Colts were unable to get any points. Three plays after the interception, Broncos linebacker Reggie Hayward recovered a fumble from James on the Broncos' 38-yard line. After that, the Broncos drove 62 yards in 12 plays and scored with Plummer's 7-yard touchdown pass to Smith, cutting their deficit to 41–10. But by then, there was only seven minutes left in the game.

This was the first postseason meeting between the Broncos and Colts.

== Divisional round ==
=== Saturday, January 10, 2004 ===
==== NFC: Carolina Panthers 29, St. Louis Rams 23 (2OT) ====
Carolina Panthers vs. St. Louis Rams – Game summary

Quarter	1	2	3	4	OT	2OT	Total
Panthers	0	10	6	7	0	6	29
Rams	3	6	3	11	0	0	23

at Edward Jones Dome, St. Louis, Missouri

- Game time: 4:30 p.m. EST/3:30 p.m. CST
- Game weather: Played indoors, domed stadium
- Game attendance: 66,165
- Referee: Mike Carey
- TV announcers (Fox): Dick Stockton (play-by-play), Daryl Johnston (color commentator), and Tony Siragusa (sideline reporter)

Game information

First quarter

- STL – Jeff Wilkins 20-yard field goal, 5:34. Rams 3–0. Drive: 11 plays, 81 yards, 6:37.

Second quarter

- STL – Jeff Wilkins 26-yard field goal, 13:26. Rams 6–0. Drive: 6 plays, 17 yards, 2:15.
- CAR – Muhsin Muhammad fumble recovery in the end zone (John Kasay kick), 11:22. Panthers 7–6. Drive: 4 plays, 68 yards, 2:04.
- STL – Jeff Wilkins 24-yard field goal, 6:58. Rams 9–7. Drive: 8 plays, 48 yards, 4:24.
- CAR – John Kasay 45-yard field goal, 1:07. Panthers 10–9. Drive: 9 plays, 32 yards, 5:51.

Third quarter

- STL – Jeff Wilkins 51-yard field goal, 11:25. Rams 12–10. Drive: 8 plays, 42 yards, 3:35.
- CAR – John Kasay 52-yard field goal, 7:45. Panthers 13–12. Drive: 7 plays, 49 yards, 3:40.
- CAR – John Kasay 34-yard field goal, 0:43. Panthers 16–12. Drive: 13 plays, 64 yards, 6:29.

Fourth quarter

- CAR – Brad Hoover 7-yard run (John Kasay kick), 8:50. Panthers 23–12. Drive: 7 plays, 73 yards, 4:18.
- STL – Marshall Faulk 1-yard run (Dane Looker pass from Marc Bulger), 2:39. Panthers 23–20. Drive: 15 plays, 57 yards, 3:50.
- STL – Jeff Wilkins 33-yard field goal, 0:00. Tied 23–23. Drive: 5 plays, 43 yards, 2:39.

First overtime

- No scoring plays.

Second overtime

- CAR – Steve Smith 69-yard pass from Jake Delhomme, 14:50. Panthers 29–23. Drive: 3 plays, 65 yards, 1:11.

Top passers

- CAR – Jake Delhomme – 16/26, 290 yards, TD, INT
- STL – Marc Bulger – 27/46, 332 yards, 3 INT

Top rushers

- CAR – DeShaun Foster – 21 rushes, 95 yards
- STL – Marshall Faulk – 19 rushes, 53 yards, TD

Top receivers

- CAR – Steve Smith – 6 receptions, 163 yards, TD
- STL – Isaac Bruce – 7 receptions, 116 yards

The Panthers stunned the favored Rams in double-overtime, the fifth longest game in NFL history, in a thrilling finish to a game that featured big swings in momentum.

The Rams scored on their first drive of the game, with Marc Bulger completing passes to Dane Looker and Isaac Bruce for gains of 24 and 17 yards on the way to a 20-yard Jeff Wilkins field goal. They went on to add another field goal on their first drive of the second quarter, set up by Tommy Polley's 37-yard interception return to the Panthers' 22-yard line. On the first play after the ensuing kickoff, the Panthers managed to take the momentum with a 65-yard run by Stephen Davis, giving them a first down on the Rams' 4-yard line. Eventually faced with third and goal from the 5, quarterback Jake Delhomme was tackled behind the line and fumbled the ball while attempting a shovel pass, but it rolled into the end zone where receiver Muhsin Muhammad recovered it for a touchdown that gave the Panthers a 7–6 lead. The Rams got the ball back on their own 46-yard line due to a 15-yard face mask penalty by Mike Minter while tackling Arlen Harris at the end of a 30-yard return, and retook the lead with a third field goal from Wilkins. However, the Panthers also received good field position to start their next series, as Brad Hoover returned the next kickoff 19 yards to the Panthers' 41-yard line. Delhomme then led the Panthers to the Rams' 27-yard line where John Kasay kicked a 45-yard field goal, giving the Panthers a 10–9 lead at the end of the half.

For the third time in three quarters, the Rams scored a field goal on their first drive, this one a franchise playoff record 51-yard kick from Wilkins that was set up by Bruce's 24-yard reception. However, the Panthers stormed back with three unanswered scoring drives. Kasay soon responded with a franchise playoff record field goal of his own, this one from 52 yards, to retake the Panthers' lead at 13–12. Following a Rams punt, the Panthers drove 64 yards in 14 plays and scored again on Kasay's 34-yard kick. Then in the fourth quarter, Minter intercepted a pass from Bulger on the Panthers 27-yard line. The Panthers subsequently drove 73 yards, including a 36-yard catch by Steve Smith, to score on Hoover's 7-yard touchdown run and increase their lead to 23–12.

The Panthers now seemed to be in control of the game, especially when Deon Grant intercepted Bulger's pass on the first play after the ensuing kickoff and returned it 16 yards to the Rams' 28-yard line. But the Panthers went three and out, and on their third down play, defensive tackle Tyoka Jackson's 11-yard sack pushed them to the outer limits of field goal range, where Kasay missed a 53-yard kick attempt with 6:26 left in regulation.

The Rams took the ball back and drove 57 yards in 15 plays, featuring a 22-yard reception by Marshall Faulk on fourth down and two, and scored with Faulk's 1-yard touchdown run. Bulger's subsequent 2-point conversion pass to Looker cut the score to 23–20 with 2:39 to go. Then Wilkins recovered his own onside kick, setting up a 43-yard drive that ended with his 33-yard field goal. The field goal would cause some controversy, as the Rams held the ball inside the Panthers' 20-yard line with less than a minute remaining, and one timeout. But Rams head coach Mike Martz elected to play for the tie, allowing the clock to run down and kick the tying field goal, rather than let his quick-scoring offense try for the winning touchdown. Wilkins sent the game into overtime when he booted his fifth field goal of the afternoon through the uprights to tie the score at 23 as time expired in regulation.

Both teams blew scoring chances in the first overtime period. The Panthers would march down to the Rams' 22-yard line on their first drive in overtime, and Kasay made a 40-yard field goal that would have won the game. But the Panthers were flagged for delay of game, and Kasay's second attempt from 45 yards was wide right. On the Rams' ensuing possession, Wilkins attempted a 53-yard field goal, but it fell short. On the first play after Wilkins' miss, Muhammad caught a 22-yard pass on the Rams' 35-yard line. But two sacks and a false start penalty pushed the Panthers all the way back to their own side of the field and they ended up punting the ball away.

The Rams took the ball back and drove into Panthers territory, however an errant Bulger pass was intercepted by Panthers cornerback Ricky Manning. On the first play of the second overtime period, Delhomme needed only ten seconds to throw a 69-yard touchdown pass to Smith to win the game. It marked the first double-overtime game and longest NFL game since the 1986 playoffs.

Delhomme completed 16 of 26 passes for 290 yards, a touchdown, and an interception. Smith caught six passes for 163 yards and a touchdown. Bulger threw for 332 yards, but was intercepted three times. Bruce caught seven passes for 116 yards. Panthers kick returner Rod Smart returned five kickoffs for 123 yards, while Harris returned five for 124. Rams defensive end Brian Young had two sacks.

This turned out to be the last hurrah for The Greatest Show on Turf, as the Rams would head into a steady decline over the next several seasons. It was also the last playoff game for the Rams in St. Louis before returning to Los Angeles in 2016 and their last home playoff game overall until 2017.

This was the first postseason meeting between the Panthers and Rams.

==== AFC: New England Patriots 17, Tennessee Titans 14 ====
Tennessee Titans vs. New England Patriots – Game summary

Quarter	1	2	3	4	Total
Titans	7	0	7	0	14
Patriots	7	7	0	3	17

at Gillette Stadium, Foxborough, Massachusetts

- Game time: 8:00 p.m. EST
- Game weather: 4 °F (−16 °C), clear and very cold
- Game attendance: 68,436
- Referee: Bill Carollo
- TV announcers (CBS): Greg Gumbel (play-by-play), Phil Simms (color commentator), and Armen Keteyian (sideline reporter)

Game information

First quarter

- NE – Bethel Johnson 41-yard pass from Tom Brady (Adam Vinatieri kick), 10:59. Patriots 7–0. Drive: 6 plays, 69 yards, 2:52.
- TEN – Chris Brown 5-yard run (Gary Anderson kick), 7:31. Tied 7–7. Drive: 6 plays, 61 yards, 3:28.

Second quarter

- NE – Antowain Smith 1-yard run (Adam Vinatieri kick), 13:46. Patriots 14–7. Drive: 11 plays, 57 yards, 5:02.

Third quarter

- TEN – Derrick Mason 11-yard pass from Steve McNair (Gary Anderson kick), 4:14. Tied 14–14. Drive: 11 plays, 70 yards, 7:47.

Fourth quarter

- NE – Adam Vinatieri 46-yard field goal, 4:06. Patriots 17–14. Drive: 8 plays, 13 yards, 2:34.

Top passers

- TEN – Steve McNair – 18/26, 210 yards, TD, INT
- NE – Tom Brady – 21/41, 201 yards, TD

Top rushers

- TEN – Eddie George – 16 rushes, 48 yards
- NE – Antowain Smith – 16 rushes, 69 yards, TD

Top receivers

- TEN – Derrick Mason – 7 receptions, 90 yards, TD
- NE – Bethel Johnson – 2 receptions, 55 yards, TD

In one of the coldest games in NFL history, with temperatures reaching 4 °F (−16 °C), the Patriots survived the cold and NFL co-MVP Steve McNair, relying on yet another game-winning field goal from kicker Adam Vinatieri late in the fourth quarter and a key defensive stand.

Tom Brady stormed out the gates with a 19-yard completion to Kevin Faulk with his first pass attempt. A few plays later, the Titans' defensive scheme confused him and caused him to burn a timeout, but it was well spent. On the next play, he threw a 41-yard touchdown pass to Bethel Johnson. McNair struck back with a 15-yard completion to Derrick Mason and a 24-yard pass to running back Eddie George, moving the ball to the Patriots' 22-yard line. Roman Phifer almost ended the drive by intercepting a pass from McNair, but defensive end Richard Seymour was penalized for roughing the passer and the Titans got the ball back with a first down on the Patriots' 9-yard line. Two plays later, Chris Brown scored a 5-yard touchdown run to tie the game.

After the ensuing kickoff, Brady completed a pass to Dedric Ward for 22 yards on a 38-yard drive to the Titans' 26-yard line. The drive ended with no points when Vinatieri missed a 44-yard field goal attempt, but on the next play, safety Rodney Harrison intercepted a pass from McNair and returned it seven yards to the Patriots' 43-yard line. Brady subsequently completed four of six passes for 49 yards and rushed for three on the way to a 1-yard touchdown run by Antowain Smith to retake the lead less than two minutes into the second quarter. Later in the quarter, the Titans drove 51 yards in nine plays to the Patriots' 13-yard line, featuring a 29-yard completion from McNair to Mason. But the Patriots' defense kept them out the end zone and blocked Gary Anderson's 31-yard field goal attempt.

Early in the third quarter, McNair led the Titans on a 70-yard scoring drive, completing five consecutive passes for 59 yards and capping it off with an 11-yard touchdown pass to Mason. The rest of the third quarter was scoreless, but midway through the fourth quarter, Troy Brown's 10-yard punt return gave the Patriots great field position at the Titans' 40-yard line. The Patriots gained only 13 yards on their ensuing possession (including a critical 4-yard completion from Brady to Brown on fourth down and 3), but it was enough for Vinatieri to make a 46-yard field goal, giving the Patriots a 17–14 lead with 4:02 left in regulation.

The Titans took the ensuing kickoff and drove to the Patriots' 33-yard line. But two penalties, a 10-yard intentional grounding call and a holding penalty, pushed them back 20 yards. McNair threw an 11-yard completion on the next play, but after that, Drew Bennett had the ball knocked out of his hands on fourth down and 12, and the Titans turned the ball over on downs with 1:38 left.

This was the second postseason meeting between the Titans and Patriots. The Titans won the only prior meeting as the Houston Oilers.

Previous playoff games
Tennessee/ Houston Oilers leads 1–0 in all-time playoff games

1978

Houston Oilers 31 @ New England Patriots 14

1978 AFC Divisional playoffs

=== Sunday, January 11, 2004 ===
==== AFC: Indianapolis Colts 38, Kansas City Chiefs 31 ====
Indianapolis Colts vs. Kansas City Chiefs – Game summary

Quarter	1	2	3	4	Total
Colts	14	7	10	7	38
Chiefs	3	7	14	7	31

at Arrowhead Stadium, Kansas City, Missouri

- Game time: 1:00 p.m. EST/12:00 p.m. CST
- Game weather: 51 °F (11 °C), clear
- Game attendance: 79,159
- Referee: Gerald Austin
- TV announcers (CBS): Dick Enberg (play-by-play), Dan Dierdorf (color commentator), and Bonnie Bernstein (sideline reporter)

Game information

First quarter

- IND – Brandon Stokley 29-yard pass from Peyton Manning (Mike Vanderjagt kick), 9:20. Colts 7–0. Drive: 10 plays, 70 yards, 5:40.
- KC – Morten Andersen 22-yard field goal, 3:38. Colts 7–3. Drive: 11 plays, 73 yards, 5:42.
- IND – Edgerrin James 11-yard run (Mike Vanderjagt kick), 0:37. Colts 14–3. Drive: 6 plays, 76 yards, 3:01.

Second quarter

- KC – Dante Hall 9-yard pass from Trent Green (Morten Andersen kick), 8:35. Colts 14–10. Drive: 12 plays, 77 yards, 7:02.
- IND – Tom Lopienski 2-yard pass from Peyton Manning (Mike Vanderjagt kick), 4:29. Colts 21–10. Drive: 9 plays, 71 yards, 4:06.

Third quarter

- IND – Mike Vanderjagt 45-yard field goal, 9:24. Colts 24–10. Drive: 11 plays, 51 yards, 5:08.
- KC – Priest Holmes 1-yard run (Morten Andersen kick), 5:26. Colts 24–17. Drive: 8 plays, 55 yards, 3:58.
- IND – Reggie Wayne 19-yard pass from Peyton Manning (Mike Vanderjagt kick), 1:48. Colts 31–17. Drive: 7 plays, 64 yards, 3:38.
- KC – Dante Hall 92-yard kickoff return (Morten Andersen kick), 1:35. Colts 31–24.

Fourth quarter

- IND – Edgerrin James 1-yard run (Mike Vanderjagt kick), 11:14. Colts 38–24. Drive: 10 plays, 81 yards, 5:21.
- KC – Priest Holmes 1-yard run (Morten Andersen kick), 4:22. Colts 38–31. Drive: 17 plays, 76 yards, 6:52.

Top passers

- IND – Peyton Manning – 22/30, 304 yards, 3 TD
- KC – Trent Green – 18/30, 212 yards, TD

Top rushers

- IND – Edgerrin James – 26 rushes, 125 yards, 2 TD
- KC – Priest Holmes – 24 rushes, 176 yards, 2 TD

Top receivers

- IND – Marvin Harrison – 6 receptions, 98 yards
- KC – Tony Gonzalez – 4 receptions, 55 yards

This offensive shootout became the second puntless game in NFL playoff history. For the second game in a row, Colts punter Hunter Smith took the day off while quarterback Peyton Manning completed 22 of 30 passes for 304 yards and three touchdowns (to Reggie Wayne, Brandon Stokley and Tom Lopienski respectively), while Edgerrin James ran for a career postseason high 125 yards and two scores. On the Chiefs' side, Dante Hall caught a touchdown and returned seven kickoffs for 207 yards and another score, and Priest Holmes, who set the regular-season rushing touchdown record in 2003, rushed for 176 yards, caught five passes for 32 yards, and scored twice. The Chiefs' 33-year-old quarterback Trent Green threw for 212 yards and a touchdown while also rushing for 18 yards in his first career postseason game. A touchdown pass called back by a penalty and Holmes' third-quarter fumble, which set up a Colts' field goal, turned out to be too much for the Chiefs to overcome. Chiefs defensive coordinator Greg Robinson resigned the following week in disgrace. "He is the master," Chiefs defensive end Eric Hicks said of Manning. "That was an amazing performance. I never would have thought a quarterback would play two games in a row like that. They took us behind the woodshed and just beat us. It was embarrassing."

Manning started off the day leading the Colts 70 yards and finished the opening drive with a 29-yard touchdown pass to Stokley. The Chiefs responded with a 73-yard drive, with Holmes gaining 44 yards on five carries before Morten Andersen kicked a 22-yard field goal to cut the score to 7–3. The Colts stormed right back, driving 76 yards in six plays. Manning completed a 38-yard pass to Marvin Harrison on the drive, and James finished it with an 11-yard touchdown run. But then the Chiefs came back, driving 77 yards in 12 plays, converting three third downs, and finishing the drive with a 9-yard touchdown pass from Green to Hall in the second quarter.

After that, Manning led the Colts 71 yards and scored with a 2-yard touchdown pass to Tom Lopienski, giving them a 21–10 lead. Once again, the Chiefs drove deep into Colts territory, but this time they failed to score. First, Tony Gonzalez's 27-yard touchdown catch was called back by a pass interference penalty, and then Andersen missed a 31-yard field goal attempt.

The end of the first half briefly interrupted the barrage of scoring, but it quickly resumed in the second. On the second play of the half, Holmes' 48-yard run moved the ball to the Colts' 22-yard line. But on the next play, Colts cornerback David Macklin stripped the ball from Holmes and recovered it. After that, the Colts drove to the Chiefs' 22-yard line before the Chiefs' first key defensive play of the game, defensive tackle Shawn Barber tackling James for a 5-yard loss on third down, forced them to settle for a Mike Vanderjagt field goal, increasing their lead to 24–10. But the Chiefs were not about to go down. Hall returned the ensuing kickoff 26 yards to his own 44-yard line. Then Holmes made up for his earlier mistake by carrying the ball on six of the eight plays of the Chiefs' possession, gaining 44 yards and finishing the drive with a 1-yard touchdown run. Not to be outdone, Manning responded with five consecutive completions for 57 yards, including a 19-yard touchdown pass to Wayne to put the Colts back up by 14 points. But this margin turned out to be short lived; Hall returned the ensuing kickoff 92 yards for a touchdown.

But once again, the Chiefs' defense had no ability to stop the Colts. Manning led them on a 10-play, 81-yard drive that ended with James' 1-yard touchdown run with 10:38 left in the game. The Chiefs responded with a touchdown of their own, but it took too long. By the time Holmes finished the 17-play, 76-yard drive with a 1-yard touchdown run, only 4:16 remained in the game. The Colts then put the game away by running the clock down to eight seconds on their ensuing drive. This game is known among Chiefs fans in the pantheon of great Chiefs playoff losses as "The No Punt Game".

This was the second postseason meeting between the Colts and Chiefs. The Colts won the only prior meeting.

Previous playoff games
Indianapolis leads 1–0 in all-time playoff games

1995

Indianapolis Colts 10 @ Kansas City Chiefs 7

1995 AFC Divisional playoffs

==== NFC: Philadelphia Eagles 20, Green Bay Packers 17 (OT) ====
Green Bay Packers vs. Philadelphia Eagles – Game summary

Quarter	1	2	3	4	OT	Total
Packers	14	0	0	3	0	17
Eagles	0	7	0	10	3	20

at Lincoln Financial Field, Philadelphia, Pennsylvania

- Game time: 4:30 p.m. EST
- Game weather: 25 °F (−4 °C), clear
- Game attendance: 67,707
- Referee: Ed Hochuli
- TV announcers (Fox): Joe Buck (play-by-play), Troy Aikman, Cris Collinsworth (color commentators), and Pam Oliver (sideline reporter)

Game information

First quarter

- GB – Robert Ferguson 40-yard pass from Brett Favre (Ryan Longwell kick), 7:54. Packers 7–0. Drive: 1 play, 40 yards, 0:17.
- GB – Robert Ferguson 17-yard pass from Brett Favre (Ryan Longwell kick), 1:31. Packers 14–0. Drive: 8 plays, 86 yards, 3:30.

Second quarter

- PHI – Duce Staley 17-yard pass from Donovan McNabb (David Akers kick), 6:32. Packers 14–7. Drive: 6 plays, 77 yards, 6:32.

Third quarter

- No scoring

Fourth quarter

- PHI – Todd Pinkston 17-yard pass from Donovan McNabb (David Akers kick), 14:48. Tied 14–14. Drive: 8 plays, 89 yards, 15:27.
- GB – Ryan Longwell 21-yard field goal, 10:22. Packers 17–14. Drive: 5 plays, 48 yards, 0:57.
- PHI – David Akers 37-yard field goal, 0:05. Tied 17–17. Drive: 12 plays, 61 yards, 2:11.

Overtime

- PHI – David Akers 31-yard field goal, 10:18. Eagles 20–17. Drive: 6 plays, 21 yards, 2:39.

Top passers

- GB – Brett Favre – 15/28, 180 yards, 2 TD, INT
- PHI – Donovan McNabb – 21/39, 248 yards, 2 TD

Top rushers

- GB – Ahman Green – 25 rushes, 156 yards
- PHI – Donovan McNabb – 11 rushes, 107 yards

Top receivers

- GB – Robert Ferguson – 8 receptions, 146 yards, 2 TD
- PHI – Todd Pinkston – 7 receptions, 95 yards, TD

Ahman Green's franchise postseason record 156 rushing yards and an early 14–0 lead was not enough to lift the Packers to victory. Facing fourth down and 26 yards to go, with 1:12 left in the fourth quarter and the Packers leading 17–14, Eagles quarterback Donovan McNabb completed a 28-yard pass to Freddie Mitchell on a famous play now known as "4th and 26". The play set up David Akers' 37-yard field goal to send the game into overtime. In the extra period, an interception by Brian Dawkins set up another Akers field goal to win the game.

Midway through the first quarter, Packers lineman Nick Barnett recovered a fumble from McNabb on the Eagles' 40-yard line, and Brett Favre threw a 40-yard touchdown pass to Robert Ferguson on the next play. James Thrash returned the ensuing kickoff 36 yards to the 44-yard line. Then McNabb made up for his mistake with a 41-yard run to the Packers' 15-yard line. But the drive stalled at the 14-yard line and ended with no points when Akers missed a 31-yard field goal attempt. After the missed field goal, Green rushed three times for 31 yards before Favre threw his second touchdown pass to Ferguson, giving the Packers a 14–0 lead with 1:16 left in the first quarter.

In the second quarter, McNabb led the Eagles on a scoring drive, completing five consecutive passes for 77 yards, including a 45-yard pass to Todd Pinkston. On the last play, his 7-yard touchdown pass to Duce Staley cut the deficit to 14–7. The Packers took the kickoff and drove 67 yards to the Eagles' 1-yard line, featuring a 33-yard run by Green, but on fourth down, Green was stuffed by linemen Jerome McDougle and Mark Simoneau for no gain and the Packers turned the ball over on downs.

Late in the third quarter, the Eagles drove 88 yards in eight plays to tie the game, despite two 10-yard penalties against them on the drive. McNabb was responsible for all of the yards on the drive, rushing for 37 yards and completing four passes for 72, including a 12-yard touchdown pass to Pinkston that tied the game on the first play of the fourth quarter.

Later on, Antonio Chatman's 10-yard punt return gave the Packers great field position on their own 49-yard line. On the next play, Favre threw a 44-yard completion to Javon Walker. The Eagles' defense kept the Packers out of the end zone, but Ryan Longwell kicked a 21-yard field goal to give them a 17–14 lead. After an exchange of punts, the Eagles got the ball on their own 20-yard line with 2:22 left in regulation.

Staley started out the drive with a 22-yard run. Over the next three plays, McNabb was sacked for a 16-yard loss and threw two incompletions, bringing up 4th and 26 to go with just 1:16 left in the game. But he managed to overcome the situation with a 28-yard completion to Mitchell to keep the drive alive. He then added a 3-yard run, a 9-yard pass to Mitchell, and a 10-yard completion to Pinkston to get his team into field goal range, where Akers' 37-yard field goal sent the game into overtime.

The Eagles won the coin toss in overtime, but they were forced to punt after three plays and Chatman returned the ball 15 yards to the 42-yard line. However, Dawkins intercepted Favre's first pass of the ensuing drive and returned it 35 yards to the Packers' 34-yard line. An 11-yard run by Staley and an 8-yard reception by Pinkston then set up a 31-yard field goal from Akers to win the game.

Although he was sacked eight times and lost a fumble, McNabb had a solid performance in the game, completing 21 of 39 passes for 248 yards and two touchdowns, while also rushing for 107 yards on 11 carries. His 107 rushing yards were a postseason record for a quarterback. Pinkston caught seven passes for 95 yards and a touchdown, while Thrash returned five kickoffs for 125 yards.

This was the second postseason meeting between the Packers and Eagles. The Eagles won the only prior meeting.

Previous playoff games
Green Bay and Philadelphia are tied 1–1 in all-time playoff games

1960

Green Bay Packers 13 @ Philadelphia Eagles 17

1960 NFL Championship Game

== Conference championships ==
=== Sunday, January 18, 2004 ===
==== AFC: New England Patriots 24, Indianapolis Colts 14 ====
Indianapolis Colts vs. New England Patriots – Game summary

Quarter	1	2	3	4	Total
Colts	0	0	7	7	14
Patriots	7	8	6	3	24

at Gillette Stadium, Foxborough, Massachusetts

- Game time: 3:00 p.m. EST
- Game weather: 32 °F (0 °C), cloudy, occasional snow
- Game attendance: 68,436
- Referee: Walt Coleman
- TV announcers (CBS): Greg Gumbel (play-by-play), Phil Simms (color commentator), Armen Keteyian, and Bonnie Bernstein (sideline reporters)

Game information

First quarter

- NE – David Givens 7-yard pass from Tom Brady (Adam Vinatieri kick), 8:16. Patriots 7–0. Drive: 13 plays, 65 yards, 6:44.

Second quarter

- NE – Adam Vinatieri 31-yard field goal, 12:44. Patriots 10–0. Drive: 13 plays, 67 yards, 5:42.
- NE – Adam Vinatieri 25-yard field goal, 8:06. Patriots 13–0. Drive: 11 plays, 52 yards, 4:22.
- NE – Justin Snow fumble out of bounds in the end zone for a safety, 4:08. Patriots 15–0

Third quarter

- IND – Edgerrin James 2-yard run (Mike Vanderjagt kick), 9:44. Patriots 15–7. Drive: 12 plays, 52 yards, 5:16.
- NE – Adam Vinatieri 27-yard field goal, 7:20. Patriots 18–7. Drive: 6 plays, 48 yards, 2:24.
- NE – Adam Vinatieri 21-yard field goal, 1:32. Patriots 21–7. Drive: 8 plays, 66 yards, 4:45.

Fourth quarter

- IND – Marcus Pollard 7-yard pass from Peyton Manning (Mike Vanderjagt kick), 2:27. Patriots 21–14. Drive: 13 plays, 67 yards, 3:43.
- NE – Adam Vinatieri 34-yard field goal, 0:50. Patriots 24–14. Drive: 4 plays, 4 yards, 0:51.

Top passers

- IND – Peyton Manning – 23/47, 237 yards, TD, 4 INT
- NE – Tom Brady – 22/37, 237 yards, TD, INT

Top rushers

- IND – Edgerrin James – 19 rushes, 78 yards, TD
- NE – Antowain Smith – 22 rushes, 100 yards

Top receivers

- IND – Marcus Pollard – 6 receptions, 90 yards, TD
- NE – Troy Brown – 7 receptions, 88 yards

The Patriots' defense dominated the Colts, only allowing 14 points, intercepting four passes from Peyton Manning (three of them by Ty Law), recording four sacks (three by Jarvis Green), and forcing a safety. Although the Patriots' offense fared no better and only scored one touchdown, Vinatieri's five field goals made up for the difference as the Patriots won, 24–14, to advance to their second Super Bowl appearance in three seasons.

The Patriots took the opening kickoff and scored on their first drive, advancing the ball 65 yards in 13 plays. Tom Brady completed four passes to receiver David Givens for 40 yards on the drive, including a 7-yard touchdown pass, and converted a fourth down on his own 44-yard line with a 2-yard run. Manning seemed ready to counter, driving the Colts 68 yards to the Patriots' 5-yard line, but on third down and 3, his pass was intercepted by Rodney Harrison in the end zone. After the interception, the Patriots drove 67 yards to the Colts' 13-yard line where Vinatieri's 31-yard field goal increased their lead to 10–0.

The Patriots' defense continued to dominate the Colts in the second quarter. On the first play after the ensuing kickoff, Law intercepted a pass from Manning and returned it six yards to the 41-yard line. The Patriots then drove 52 yards and increased their lead to 13–0 with a second Vinatieri field goal. Brady completed three passes for 42 yards on the drive, including a 17-yarder to Givens and a 16-yard completion to Troy Brown on fourth down and 8. For the first time in the entire postseason, the Colts were forced to punt on their next drive. Apparently, they were very out of practice, because the snap from center Justin Snow sailed over the head of punter Hunter Smith. The ball went into the end zone, and Smith was forced to knock it out of bounds for a safety, making the score 15–0.

The Colts had a great opportunity to score when cornerback David Macklin recovered a fumble from receiver Bethel Johnson three plays after the free kick, giving the Colts a first down on the Patriots 41-yard line. But five plays later, Harrison forced a fumble while tackling Marvin Harrison, and cornerback Tyrone Poole recovered it.

Trailing 15–0 at halftime, the Colts finally managed to build some momentum in the third quarter. First, Dominic Rhodes gave them great field position by returning the second half kickoff 35 yards to the 49-yard line. Then running back Edgerrin James spearheaded a 52-yard scoring drive, carrying the ball on seven of 12 plays for 32 yards and capping it off with a 2-yard touchdown run to cut the score to 15–7. But the Patriots took over the rest of the quarter. After Patrick Pass returned the ensuing kickoff 21 yards to the 43-yard line, Brady completed passes to Larry Centers for 28 yards, Brown for 17, and Kevin Faulk for 8, setting up Vinatieri's third field goal to increase their lead to 18–7. Three plays after the ensuing kickoff, the Colts were forced to punt. Antowain Smith then rushed four times for 53 yards on the Patriots' next possession, advancing the ball to the Colts' 3-yard line where Vinatieri kicked his fourth field goal. Two plays after the ensuing kickoff, Law recorded his second interception from Manning on the Colts' 31-yard line. But this time, the Patriots failed to score because cornerback Walt Harris picked off a pass from Brady in the end zone.

After the turnover, the Colts drove 57 yards to the Patriots' 31-yard line. But then Manning threw his third interception to Law with 8:17 left in the fourth quarter. After forcing a punt, Manning led the Colts back, completing eight of nine passes for 64 yards and finishing the drive with a 7-yard touchdown pass to Marcus Pollard with 2:22 left in regulation. The Colts failed to recover their ensuing onside kick attempt, but forced a punt with 2:01 left. However, the Patriots' defense limited Manning to four consecutive incompletions, causing the Colts to turn the ball over on downs. Then after making the Colts use up all of their timeouts, Vinatieri's fifth field goal increased the Patriots' lead to 24–14. The Colts attempted one last desperation drive, but ended up turning the ball over on downs again with seven seconds left in the game.

Brady completed 22 of 37 passes for 237 yards, a touchdown, and an interception. Smith rushed for 100 yards. Pollard caught six passes for 90 yards and a touchdown. Rhodes returned five kickoffs for 121 yards, rushed for 16 yards, and caught two passes for 17 yards.

Colts players would later publicly complain that the game officials did not properly call illegal contact, pass interference, and defensive holding penalties on the Patriots' defensive backs. This, and similar complaints made by other NFL teams, would prompt the NFL during the 2004 offseason to instruct all of the league's officials to strictly enforce these types of fouls.

This was the first postseason meeting between the Colts and Patriots.

==== NFC: Carolina Panthers 14, Philadelphia Eagles 3 ====
Carolina Panthers vs. Philadelphia Eagles – Game summary

Quarter	1	2	3	4	Total
Panthers	0	7	7	0	14
Eagles	0	3	0	0	3

at Lincoln Financial Field, Philadelphia, Pennsylvania

- Game time: 6:30 p.m. EST
- Game weather: 33 °F (1 °C), cloudy
- Game attendance: 65,158
- Referee: Bernie Kukar
- TV announcers (Fox): Joe Buck (play-by-play), Troy Aikman, Cris Collinsworth (color commentators), and Pam Oliver (sideline reporter)

Game information

First quarter

- No scoring plays.

Second quarter

- CAR – Muhsin Muhammad 24-yard pass from Jake Delhomme (John Kasay kick), 10:12. Panthers 7–0. Drive: 8 plays, 79 yards, 4:48.
- PHI – David Akers 41-yard field goal, 2:56. Panthers 7–3. Drive: 14 plays, 44 yards, 7:16.

Third quarter

- CAR – DeShaun Foster 1-yard run (John Kasay kick), 4:11. Panthers 14–3. Drive: 4 plays, 37 yards, 2:07.

Fourth quarter

- No scoring plays.

Top passers

- CAR – Jake Delhomme – 9/14, 101 yards, TD
- PHI – Donovan McNabb – 10/22, 100 yards, 3 INT

Top rushers

- CAR – Stephen Davis – 19 rushes, 76 yards
- PHI – Duce Staley – 13 rushes, 79 yards

Top receivers

- CAR – Muhsin Muhammad – 2 receptions, 39 yards, TD
- PHI – Chad Lewis – 4 receptions, 69 yards

The Panthers' defense shut down the Eagles' offense, only allowing a field goal and holding Donovan McNabb to just 10 of 22 completions for 100 yards. Rookie cornerback Ricky Manning intercepted McNabb three times, while the Panthers' defense recorded a total of five sacks. McNabb also sustained a lower-rib injury early in the game but stayed in until the second half. Although the Panthers' offense only scored 14 points, it was more than enough for the team to earn their first trip to the Super Bowl with a 14–3 win. For the Eagles, it was their third straight NFC Championship Game loss, and the second straight at home.

After a scoreless first quarter, the Panthers mounted the only long scoring drive of the game, advancing the ball 79 yards and scoring with Jake Delhomme's 24-yard touchdown pass to Muhsin Muhammad. The Eagles responded by driving 44 yards and scoring with a 41-yard field goal from David Akers. The Eagles then forced a punt and drove to their own 44-yard line, but McNabb was intercepted by Manning and the score remained 7–3 at halftime.

The Eagles took the second half kickoff and drove to the Panthers' 18-yard line before Manning ended the drive with his second interception. Then after a punt, Manning recorded his third interception and returned it 13 yards to the Eagles' 37-yard line. Four plays later, DeShaun Foster's 1-yard touchdown run increased the Panthers' lead to 14–3.

In the fourth quarter, the Eagles had one last chance to come back, driving 74 yards in 11 plays to the Panthers' 11-yard line. But linebacker Dan Morgan picked off a pass from backup quarterback Koy Detmer in the end zone with 5:16 left. The next time the Eagles got the ball back, they turned the ball over on downs and the Panthers ran out the clock to win the game.

Carolina became the first NFC team since the 1987 Redskins to reach the Super Bowl not as the first seed or second seed in the conference.

This was the first postseason meeting between the Panthers and Eagles.

== Super Bowl XXXVIII: New England Patriots 32, Carolina Panthers 29 ==
Super Bowl XXXVIII – Carolina Panthers vs. New England Patriots – Game summary

Quarter	1	2	3	4	Total
Panthers (NFC)	0	10	0	19	29
Patriots (AFC)	0	14	0	18	32

at Reliant Stadium, Houston, Texas

- Date: February 1, 2004
- Game attendance: 71,525
- Referee: Ed Hochuli
- TV announcers (CBS): Greg Gumbel (play-by-play), Phil Simms (color commentator), Armen Keteyian, and Bonnie Bernstein (sideline reporters)

This was the first Super Bowl meeting between the Panthers and Patriots.
