= Cooper High School (Abilene, Texas) =

Coordinates: 32.4063°N 99.7488°W

O.H. Cooper High School

Location
- 3639 Sayles Blvd; Abilene, Texas 79605; United States

Information
- School type: Public high school
- Established: 1960
- School district: Abilene Independent School District
- Principal: Lyndsey Williamson
- Staff: 107.82 (FTE)
- Grades: 9–12
- Student to teacher ratio: 14.80
- Colors: Royal blue and scarlet
- Athletics conference: UIL Class AAAAA
- Mascot: Cougar
- Nickname: Coogs
- Feeder schools: Madison & Clack middle schools
- Website: Cooper High School

O.H. Cooper High School (commonly referred to as Abilene Cooper) is a public high school located in Abilene, Texas. It opened in 1960, in part to handle the increase in school age youth resulting from the Post World War II Baby Boom. It is one of three 4-year high schools within Abilene Independent School District.

Cooper High is named for Oscar Henry Cooper, who was president of Baylor University from 1898 to 1902. Prior to such time, his advocacy for a state-supported and state-controlled university led to the establishment of the University of Texas. After his time at Baylor, Dr. Cooper was president of Hardin–Simmons University in Abilene until 1909. Thereafter, he headed "Cooper's Boys' School" in Abilene until 1915.

It is the zoned high school of Dyess Air Force Base.

== Faculty and academics ==
Abilene is the home of Dyess Air Force Base, and retired officers, and spouses of officers, from Dyess became teachers at Cooper. Retired US Air Force Colonel James Alderman, a mathematics and science teacher at the school, explained to his students that he worked on the development of the Gamma Ray Spectrometer and did research relating to nuclear fusion while in the United States Air Force. Retired US Air Force Colonel James Zumwalt taught Honors Calculus and, in 1981–1982, was zoo keeper over his homeroom class that called itself the "Zoo." Members of the Zoo included many of the top graduating students in 1982 and yet still managed to win the intramural sports championship.

In the years 1979 to 1982, Cooper consistently fielded teams for UIL competitions that finished in the top of their subject areas, including Speech, Creative Writing, Orchestra, Math, Band, and Choir. Cooper graduates frequently were named as Scholars, Finalists, Semi-finalists, and Commended by the National Merit Scholarship Program. Six members of the Class of 1982 received the Scholar designation.

== Athletics ==
=== Volleyball ===
The Cooper High School Volleyball Team won the state 4A championship in 1967, defeating San Antonio Harlandale 15–0; 11–15; 15–7.

=== Golf ===
The Cooper High School Golf Team won the 5A State Championship in 1982, 1983, and 1984.

Bob Estes, Class of 1984, won the individual state title in 1983. As a collegiate golfer at the University of Texas, Bob was selected as an All-American, received the Jack Nicklaus award, and was named 1988 College Player of the Year. Mike Standly, Class of 1982, played for the University of Houston, finished in second place to Scott Verplank at the 1986 NCAA championship, won his first tournament in 1993, the Freeport-McMoRan Classic in New Orleans, and can still be found on professional golf tours.

=== Tennis ===
The Cooper High School Tennis Team has made appearances at the Texas state competition 8 times in its history, ranking 5th in the state for all-time appearances in conference 5A. It competed in 1985, 1986, 1987, 1989, 1992 and won the championship for three consecutive years in 1993, 1994 and 1995.

Ricky Meyers won the state singles title in 1976 and Ryan Hughes did the same in 1995. David Meyers and Scott Meyers (identical twins) won boys doubles state in 1982.

Jana Hanks won the state singles title in 1975 and 1976, Susie Ingram and Julie Jones won the state doubles title in 1976, and Leanne Hill and Stephanie Burnam won the state doubles title in 1982.

As of November, 2009, The Cooper Tennis Team is ranked 8th in the state in conference 4A.

==== Tennis State Championships ====
- Boys Singles
  - 1976 – Ricky Meyers (4A)
  - 1995 – Ryan Hughes (5A)
- Boys Doubles
  - 1982 – Scott & David Meyers (5A)
- Girls Singles
  - 1975 – Jana Hanks (4A)
  - 1976 – Jana Hanks (4A)
- Girls Doubles
  - 1976 – Susie Ingram & Julie Jones (4A)
  - 1982 – Leanna Hill & Stephanie Burnam (5A)
- Team Championships
  - 1986 – lost to San Antonio Churchill High School 3–10
  - 1987 – lost to Tyler Lee High School 6–9
  - 1993 – def. Klein High School 9–2
  - 1994 – def. Houston Clear Lake High School 15–3
  - 1995 – def. Plano High School 9–3

=== Baseball ===
Baseball teams from Cooper won the state championship game in 1987 and 1988.

=== Gymnastics ===
Cooper has won the following titles:

==== Gymnastics Championships ====
- Men
  - 1973 – Donovan Sparhawk(Parallel Bars)
  - 1975 – Steve Rutledge (Rings)
  - 1976 – Steve Rutledge (Rings)
  - 1978 – Larry Hanson (Floor)
  - 1979 – Team Champions: David Hardy (Floor), David Watson, (Parallel Bars), J.T. Fletcher (Pommels, Vault, High Bar, All-Around)
  - 1983 – Bobby Cluck (Pommels), David Henson (High Bar)
  - 1984 – David Henson (High Bar)
  - 1988 – Greg Joyner (Vault, High Bar)
  - 1989 – Chris Reese (Rings), Greg Joyner (Vault)
  - 1990 – Andrew Clamann (Pommels)
  - 1991 – Team Champions: Andrew Clamann (Pommels), Jimmy Chai Kong (Rings), Greg Clark (Parallel Bars)
  - 1992 – Team Champions: Landon King (Rings), Eddie Marentes (Parallel Bars)
  - 1993 – Landon King (Rings, Parallel Bars)
  - 2003 – Nate Dalo (Rings)
- Women
  - 1978 – Cathy Cubine (Bars)
  - 1979 – Cathy Cubine (Beam, All-Around)
  - 1980 – Cathy Cubine (Bars, Floor, All-Around), Missy Urquhart (Vault)
  - 1981 – Missy Urquhart (Bars, Beam, Floor)

=== Football ===
==== Professional Players ====
Dominic Rhodes and Justin Snow were members of the 2007 NFL champion Indianapolis Colts.

Ray Berry played for the Minnesota Vikings and Seattle Seahawks from 1987 to 1993

Terry Orr played for the Washington Redskins and San Diego Chargers from 1986 to 1993

== Fine arts ==
Cooper has programs relating to the fine and performing arts. 215 individuals have been named to the Texas All-State roster, with at least one Cooper student making All-State Choir, Band or Orchestra every year since 1971.

Cooper has a band. Often among the largest high school marching bands in Texas in the 1980s and 1990s, the band made frequent appearances at the State Marching Contest. The band marched in the 1990 Rose Parade, one of only a handful of Texas High School bands to have ever done so.

=== TMEA All-State Musicians ===
Cooper has had over 200 individuals be named to Texas All-State Bands, Choirs and Orchestras since 1971.

==== Band ====
- Piccolo – 4: 1994, 1995, 1996, 1999
- Flute – 10: 1975, 1976, 1977, 1986, 1987 (2), 1993, 1997, 2000, 2001
- B♭ Clarinet – 15: 1985, 1986, 1987, 1990, 1991, 1992 (2), 1993, 1994 (2), 1995, 2001, 2002, 2004, 2005, 2012
- Bass Clarinet – 2: 1988, 2021
- Oboe – 5: 1975, 1976, 1977, 1996, 2023
- Bassoon – 3: 1972, 1974, 1975
- Alto Saxophone – 6: 1993, 2001, 2002, 2003, 2008, 2018
- Baritone Saxophone – 1: 2006
- Cornet/Trumpet – 8: 1986 (2), 1987, 1988, 1989, 1990, 1996, 2000
- Horn – 4: 1971, 1974, 2020, 2022
- Tenor Trombone – 14: 1986 (2), 1987 (2), 1988, 1989, 1992, 1995 (2), 1999, 2000, 2001, 2002, 2005
- Bass Trombone – 2: 1984, 1985
- Euphonium – 4: – 2001, 2004, 2006, 2008
- Tuba – 2: – 2009, 2010
- Percussion – 10: 1986, 1987, 1989, 1990, 1991, 1992, 1995, 1996, 2001, 2019, 2023
- Harp – 1: 1972

==== Choir ====
- Soprano 1 – 8: 1975, 1980, 1981, 1984, 1985, 1991, 1996, 2003
- Soprano 2 – 20: 1975 (2), 1976, 1979, 1980, 1984, 1989 (2), 1995, 1998, 1999 (2), 2001, 2002, 2003 (3), 2004, 2005
- Alto 1 – 18: 1972, 1974, 1975 (2), 1979, 1981, 1982, 1983, 1984 (3), 1989, 1992, 1996, 1997 (2), 1999, 2003
- Alto 2 – 13: 1975, 1979, 1980, 1982, 1984, 1988, 1989, 1991, 1992, 1993, 2001, 2005
- Tenor 1 – 12: 1974, 1975, 1976, 1979, 1980, 1981, 1982, 1983, 1985, 1988, 1989, 1995
- Tenor 2 – 16: 1974, 1977, 1979, 1981, 1982, 1984, 1985, 1986, 1990, 1991, 1992 (2), 1993 (2), 2004, 2005, 2011
- Bass 1 – 11: 1977, 1982, 1985 (2), 1986, 1988, 1989, 1994, 2002, 2004 (2)
- Bass 2 – 10: 1974, 1975, 1976, 1977 (2), 1985, 1986, 1990, 1994, 1995

==== Orchestra ====
- Oboe - 1: 1974
- Violin 1 – 4: 1972, 1974, 1993, 1994
- Violin 2 – 2: 1973, 1974
- Cello – 5: 1972, 1976, 1977, 1978, 1990
- String Bass – 7: 1986, 1987, 1988, 1989, 1990, 1999, 2001

== Notable alumni ==
- Cory Aldridge, professional baseball player
- Randy Allen, Highland Park football coach
- Ray Berry, professional football player
- Bob Estes, professional golfer
- Jeff Ireland, former General Manager of the Miami Dolphins
- Dave Johnson, former professional baseball player
- Ashley Estes Kavanaugh, personal secretary to George W. Bush
- Dowell Loggains, assistant coach, Chicago Bears, Tennessee Titans
- Jack Mildren, professional football player, Lieutenant Governor of Oklahoma
- Terry Orr, professional football player
- Andrae Patterson, professional basketball player
- Dominic Rhodes, professional football player
- Robert Sloan, former president, Baylor University
- Justin Snow, professional football player
- Rawson Stovall, video game producer, author, and first nationally syndicated reviewer of video games
- Steven Stucky, Pulitzer Prize-winning classical composer
- Bernie Tiede, convicted murderer, subject of movie Bernie

== See also ==
- Jack Mildren
- Forest Park High School (Beaumont, Texas)
- Post World War II Baby Boom
- Buzz Bissinger
- Friday Night Lights (film)
- Permian High School
