= Tom Santi =

American football player (born 1985)

No. 86
- Position: Tight end

Personal information
- Born: November 22, 1985 (age 40); New Orleans, Louisiana, U.S.
- Listed height: 6 ft 3 in (1.91 m)
- Listed weight: 250 lb (113 kg)

Career information
- High school: Montgomery Bell Academy (TN)
- College: Virginia
- NFL draft: 2008: 6th round, 196th overall pick

Career history
- Indianapolis Colts (2008–2010)

Awards and highlights
- Second-team All-ACC (2007)

Career NFL statistics
- Receptions: 18
- Receiving yards: 171
- Receiving touchdowns: 1
- Stats at Pro Football Reference

Michael Thomas Santi (born November 22, 1985) is an American former professional football player who was a tight end in the National Football League (NFL). He was selected 196th overall by the Indianapolis Colts in the sixth round of the 2008 NFL draft, and played two seasons for them. Before that, he played college football for the Virginia Cavaliers. In high school, he was a tight end at Montgomery Bell Academy in Nashville, Tennessee.

Pre-draft measurables
Height	Weight	Arm length	Hand span	40-yard dash	10-yard split	20-yard split	20-yard shuttle	Vertical jump	Broad jump	Bench press
6 ft 3 1/2 in (1.92 m)	250 lb (113 kg)	33 1/4 in (0.84 m)	9 3/8 in (0.24 m)	4.81 s	1.70 s	2.79 s	4.27 s	36.0 in (0.91 m)	10 ft 1 in (3.07 m)	14 reps
