= All-State Choir =

All-State Choir is a statewide choral event in each individual American state, usually for one weekend during the school year. The choirs are honor groups composed of a highly select group of high school students who are the top music students from their respective schools, with the Kansas Music Educators Association calling the all-state musicians "truly the best of the best," and American Choral Directors Association saying it's a "prestigious ensemble."

Participation is competitive. For instance, in Texas, 1,810 students are chosen from 70,000 who begin the audition process. Some states have audition processes that can include making it through various levels of auditions in front of judging panels, with some having several rounds of auditions including region choir, pre-area candidacy, then area, all before making it to the all-state level. Auditions can include both prepared pieces and sight reading.

All-state choir is held by the Educational Music Association body of each respective state. On all-state weekends, students converge in one city, staying in a hotel together with several rehearsals and social events. They often get to work with renowned guest conductors, preparing collegiate-level music to be performed for large audiences like at the Buell Theater in the Denver Performing Arts Complex with a capacity of almost 3,000 seats.
