= Ed Johnson (American football) =

American football player (born 1983)

No. 99, 92
- Position: Defensive tackle

Personal information
- Born: December 18, 1983 (age 42); Detroit, Michigan, U.S.
- Listed height: 6 ft 2 in (1.88 m)
- Listed weight: 296 lb (134 kg)

Career information
- College: Penn State
- NFL draft: 2007: undrafted

Career history
- Indianapolis Colts (2007–2009); Carolina Panthers (2010)

Awards and highlights
- PFW / PFWA All-Rookie Team (2007)

Career NFL statistics
- Total tackles: 81
- Sacks: 1
- Forced fumbles: 1
- Interceptions: 1
- Stats at Pro Football Reference

Edward Andre Johnson (born December 18, 1983) is an American former professional football player who was a defensive tackle in the National Football League (NFL). He was signed by the Indianapolis Colts as undrafted free agent in 2007. He played college football for the Penn State Nittany Lions.

== Early life ==
Johnson was a multi-sport star at Crockett Technical High School in Detroit, playing football, basketball and track and field. He won the class B state championship in the 100m and 200m dash in both 1997 and 1998.

== Professional career ==
=== Indianapolis Colts ===
Johnson had an immediate impact in his NFL debut, registering 3 solo tackles in the Colt's Week 1 victory over the New Orleans Saints in relief of the injured Anthony McFarland. He would lead Colts linemen in tackles in 2007 with 72, including a season-high 9 tackles in the Colts' AFC Divisional Playoff loss to the San Diego Chargers. He finished the season ranked in the top 20 in tackles among NFL rookies.

The only defensive lineman to start all 16 games for the Colts in 2007, Johnson received the Thomas W. Moses Sr./Noble Max Award, given annually by Indianapolis media to a player "who has overcome adversity in his career, or whose on-field accomplishments exceeded normal expectations."

On September 10, 2008, it was reported that Johnson had been stopped by Hamilton County, Indiana police on I-465 for speeding and was also found to have marijuana in his possession. He was arrested and released after posting bond. After a brief internal investigation, the Colts cut Johnson from the team less than 24 hours later.

On May 5, 2009, Johnson was re-signed by the Colts, with new head coach Jim Caldwell saying that they would give him a second chance, hoping that he learned from his mistakes.

On October 13, 2009, Johnson was waived by the Colts for the second time. At the press conference announcing the move, Caldwell said that the decision was based more on "production than anything else."

=== Carolina Panthers ===
On February 16, 2010, Johnson signed with the Carolina Panthers.
