= Justin Snow =

American football player (born 1976)

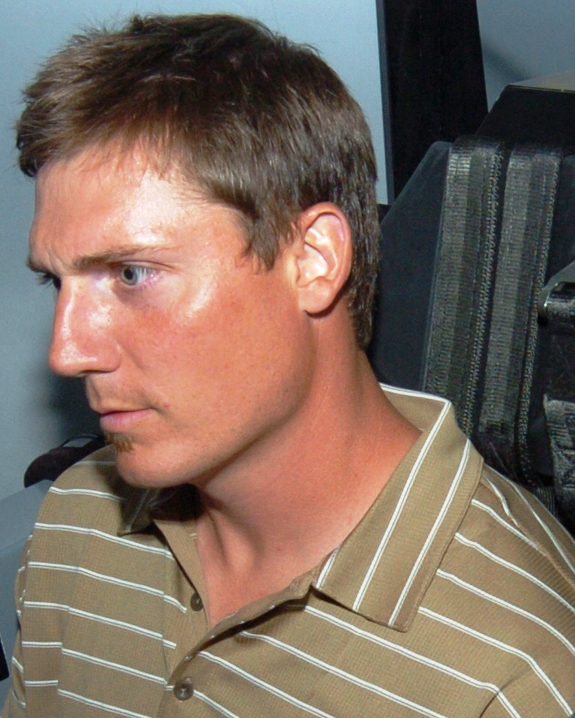
- Snow in June 2007

No. 48, 54
- Position: Long snapper

Personal information
- Born: December 21, 1976 (age 49); Ft. Worth, Texas, U.S.
- Listed height: 6 ft 3 in (1.91 m)
- Listed weight: 245 lb (111 kg)

Career information
- High school: Cooper (Abilene, Texas)
- College: Baylor
- NFL draft: 2000: undrafted

Career history
- Indianapolis Colts (2000–2011); Washington Redskins (2012)

Awards and highlights
- Super Bowl champion (XLI)

Career NFL statistics
- Games played: 200
- Total tackles: 39
- Stats at Pro Football Reference

Justin Snow (born December 21, 1976) is an American former professional football player who was a long snapper in the National Football League (NFL). He played college football for the Baylor Bears. He signed as an undrafted free agent in 2000 with the Indianapolis Colts, who he played twelve seasons with, winning Super Bowl XLI with the Colts against the Chicago Bears.

He was also a member of the Washington Redskins.

== Early life ==
Snow was born in Abilene, Texas, and attended Cooper High School where he was an AP and a Texas Sportswriters Association All-State First-team selection, and, as a senior, recorded ten sacks, 70 tackles, three forced fumbles, and two fumble recoveries.

== College career ==
Snow attended Baylor University and was a four-year letterman in football as both a defensive end and long snapper. He finished his college career with five sacks, and 189 tackles (15 tackles for loss). He graduated with Bachelor's and Master's degrees in Speech Pathology.

== Professional career ==
=== Indianapolis Colts ===
Snow went drafted in the 2000 NFL draft, however he signed with the Indianapolis Colts as a free agent and began serving as the team's long snapper and a backup tight end. In 2003, Snow and kicker Mike Vanderjagt, along with the holder (Hunter Smith) became the first snapper, holder and kicker trio in the league's history to go an entire season, including the playoffs, without missing a field goal or point-after attempt. Snow played with former Cooper High School teammate Dominic Rhodes on the Colts. Super Bowl XLI, a game in which three players that once resided in Abilene, Texas participated. Snow and Rhodes both played for the Colts and for Cooper High School, and Danieal Manning played for the Chicago Bears and attended Abilene Christian University. Prior to Super Bowl XLI, only one other person that once lived in Abilene, Texas had played in the Super Bowl, Terry Orr. Orr played for Cooper High School in Abilene as well as the Washington Redskins where he played in Super Bowls XXII and XXVI. On August 31, 2012, Snow was cut from the Colts ending his twelve-year career as a Colt.

=== Washington Redskins ===
Snow signed with the Washington Redskins on September 11, 2012. On November 6, Snow was waived by the Redskins after they activated Nick Sundberg from injured reserve.
