= Dominic Rhodes =

American gridiron football player (born 1979)

No. 33, 38, 30
- Position: Running back

Personal information
- Born: January 17, 1979 (age 47); Waco, Texas, U.S.
- Listed height: 5 ft 9 in (1.75 m)
- Listed weight: 203 lb (92 kg)

Career information
- High school: Cooper (Abilene, Texas)
- College: Tyler JC (1997–1998); Midwestern State (1999–2000)
- NFL draft: 2001: undrafted

Career history
- Indianapolis Colts (2001–2006); Oakland Raiders (2007); Indianapolis Colts (2008); Buffalo Bills (2009)*; Florida Tuskers (2010); Indianapolis Colts (2010); Virginia Destroyers (2011–2012); Montreal Alouettes (2013)*
- * Offseason or practice squad member only

Awards and highlights
- Super Bowl champion (XLI); UFL champion (2011); UFL's Offensive Player of the Year (2011)

Career NFL statistics
- Rushing yards: 3,286
- Rushing touchdowns: 26
- Receiving yards: 1,025
- Receiving touchdowns: 4
- Return yards: 3,374
- Return touchdowns: 2
- Stats at Pro Football Reference
- Stats at CFL.ca (archive)

Dominic Dondrell Rhodes (born January 17, 1979) is an American former professional football player who was a running back in the National Football League (NFL). He played college football for the Midwestern State Mustangs and was signed by the Indianapolis Colts as an undrafted free agent in 2001.

Rhodes was also a member of the Oakland Raiders between stints with the Colts and Buffalo Bills. He earned a Super Bowl ring with the Colts in Super Bowl XLI, defeating the Chicago Bears, and set an NFL record for rushing yards by an undrafted rookie, with 1,104 yards. Rhodes also played for the Virginia Destroyers and the Florida Tuskers of the United Football League (UFL).

== College career ==
After attending Abilene Cooper High School, Rhodes was recruited by many major college programs including Texas Tech and Texas Christian University. He signed instead with Tyler Junior College in Tyler, Texas. Rhodes played two years at Tyler Junior College, where he earned All-American honors and twice was named an all-conference selection. Rhodes then attended Midwestern State University where he was a standout running back.

== Professional career ==
Pre-draft measurables
Height	Weight	40-yard dash	10-yard split	20-yard split	Vertical jump	Bench press
5 ft 9 in (1.75 m)	209 lb (95 kg)	4.52 s	1.59 s	2.58 s	32.0 in (0.81 m)	14 reps
All values from Pro Day

=== Indianapolis Colts (first stint) ===
After two years at Midwestern State University, Rhodes decided to go to the NFL. Despite his college experience, he was not chosen in the 2001 NFL draft. He was signed as an undrafted free agent by the Indianapolis Colts.

In a 2001 game against the Kansas City Chiefs, Rhodes returned a kickoff for a touchdown. In that game, the Indianapolis Colts' starting running back, Edgerrin James, injured his knee and ended his season. As a result, Rhodes was the starting running back for the rest of the Colts' 2001 season. That year, Rhodes ran for the most rushing yards by an undrafted rookie in NFL history, with 1,104, despite only starting the final nine games of the season. Rhodes missed the entire 2002 season due to a torn ACL. After recovering, he backed up James from 2003 to 2005.

During the 2006 NFL season, Rhodes split time with rookie running back Joseph Addai, as James left for the Arizona Cardinals. Rhodes finished the year with 641 yards and five touchdowns. On February 4, 2007, in Super Bowl XLI, he was the leading rusher with 113 yards on 21 carries that saw him score a one-yard touchdown before halftime to give the Colts a 16–14 lead in a game they ultimately won 29–17 to give Rhodes a Super Bowl ring.

=== Oakland Raiders ===
Rhodes became a free agent for the 2007 free agency period. On March 9, he signed a two-year, $7.5 million contract with the Oakland Raiders. On July 3, he was suspended for four games for violating the NFL's substance abuse policy.

Rhodes was released by the Raiders on April 28, two days after they drafted running back Darren McFadden fourth overall in the 2008 NFL draft.

=== Indianapolis Colts (second stint) ===
On May 7, 2008, Rhodes returned to the Colts on a one-year, $605,000 contract. During the 2008–09 season, Rhodes split time with Joseph Addai and ran for 538 yards and a team-leading six rushing touchdowns. He contributed in the passing game as well, recording 302 yards and three TDs receiving.

During the offseason, on April 19, 2009, Rhodes signed with the Buffalo Bills on a two-year deal. The Bills ended up releasing Rhodes during the preseason, without him playing a single down for them.

=== Florida Tuskers ===
Rhodes was signed by the UFL's Florida Tuskers for their 2010 season. During the 2010 season, Rhodes set UFL single-season records for total touchdowns (10), rushing yards (547) and all-purpose yards (918). He was also third in the UFL in yards from scrimmage (652) and second in kickoff return average (21.7). Rhodes scored at least one touchdown in each of the first seven games of the eight-game season.

Rhodes and the Tuskers qualified for the 2010 UFL Championship Game, but were ultimately defeated by the defending champions Las Vegas Locomotives 23–20.

=== Indianapolis Colts (third stint) ===
On December 7, 2010, just 10 days removed from the UFL Championship game, the Indianapolis Colts announced that they had signed Dominic Rhodes for the remainder of the 2010 season as well as the playoffs. Rhodes played in their remaining three games that year, and finished the season with 37 carries for 172 yards and no touchdowns. He also played in their playoff loss to the New York Jets but would not be signed for the 2011 season, becoming a free agent.

Less than a week before the 2011 regular season began, NFL Commissioner Roger Goodell announced he was suspending nine different free agents, one of whom was Rhodes. The suspension was to be for a full year and likely a result of failing a third drug test. Since Rhodes was soon to be 33 years old, it was widely believed that no team would be willing to wait a year for him to play. Thus, the suspension was also widely believed to signal the end of his NFL career.

=== Virginia Destroyers ===
The Virginia Destroyers (formerly Florida Tuskers) announced on September 8 that they had re-signed Dominic Rhodes for the 2011 season, their inaugural season in Virginia. In a week 4 win over the Sacramento Mountain Lions, Rhodes ran for 217 yards and three touchdowns, both UFL single game records. Rhodes would be named the UFL's offensive player of the year for 2011.

After going 4–1 in the shortened season, Rhodes and the Destroyers defeated the two-time defending UFL Champion Las Vegas Locos 17–3 in the 2011 UFL Championship Game in front of a jam-packed crowd at the Virginia Beach Sportsplex. Rhodes ran for 90 yards and a touchdown in the game.

Rhodes is actually one of four former NFL players to win a Super Bowl and a UFL Championship. Rhodes' teammates on the 2011 Virginia Destroyers included LB Diyral Briggs (Packers, SB XLV), DT Jay Alford (Giants, SB XLII) and WR John Standeford (Colts, and Rhodes' teammate during SB XLI) who all share the same claim.

=== Montreal Alouettes ===
On March 27, 2013, at age 34, Rhodes signed with the Montreal Alouettes of the Canadian Football League. He was released on June 16, 2013.

== NFL career statistics ==
Year	Team	Games		Rushing				
Year	Team	GP	GS	Att	Yds	Avg	Lng	TD
2001	IND	15	10	233	1,104	4.7	77	9
2002	IND	0	0	Did not play due to injury				
2003	IND	11	0	37	157	4.2	25	0
2004	IND	16	0	53	254	4.8	55	1
2005	IND	13	1	40	118	2.9	24	4
2006	IND	16	16	187	641	3.4	17	5
2007	OAK	10	2	75	302	4.0	25	1
2008	IND	15	4	152	538	3.5	38	6
2010	IND	3	0	37	172	4.6	15	0
Career		99	33	814	3,286	4.0	77	26

== Personal ==
=== Legal troubles ===
On February 20, 2007, Rhodes was driving 81 mph (130 km/h) in a 55 mph (89 km/h) zone on Interstate 65 in Indianapolis, Indiana at 3 a.m. He was pulled over by the Indiana State Police and arrested for drunk driving. Rhodes claimed at the time that he had only "two or three" alcoholic drinks; he failed two sobriety tests with a blood alcohol content of 0.09%. He subsequently pleaded guilty and on March 21, 2007, was given a suspended 180-day sentence and fined $2,000.
