= Bob Sanders =

American football player (born 1981)

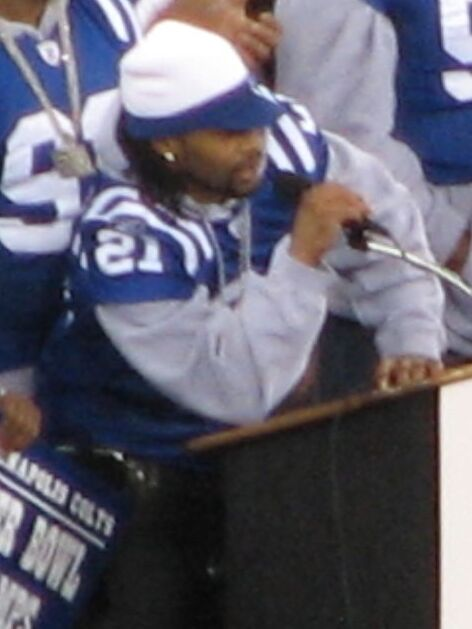
- Sanders with the Indianapolis Colts in 2007

No. 21, 31
- Position: Safety

Personal information
- Born: February 24, 1981 (age 45); Erie, Pennsylvania, U.S.
- Listed height: 5 ft 8 in (1.73 m)
- Listed weight: 206 lb (93 kg)

Career information
- High school: Cathedral Prep (Erie)
- College: Iowa (2000–2003)
- NFL draft: 2004: 2nd round, 44th overall pick

Career history
- Indianapolis Colts (2004–2010); San Diego Chargers (2011)

Awards and highlights
- Super Bowl champion (XLI); NFL Defensive Player of the Year (2007); 2× First-team All-Pro (2005, 2007); 2× Pro Bowl (2005, 2007); Second-team All-American (2003); 3× First-team All-Big Ten (2001–2003)

Career NFL statistics
- Total tackles: 307
- Sacks: 3.5
- Forced fumbles: 2
- Fumble recoveries: 3
- Interceptions: 6
- Defensive touchdowns: 1
- Stats at Pro Football Reference

Demond "Bob" Sanders (born February 24, 1981) is an American former professional football player who was a safety in the National Football League (NFL) for eight seasons. He played college football for the Iowa Hawkeyes and was selected by the Indianapolis Colts in the second round of the 2004 NFL draft. He won Super Bowl XLI with the Colts. He was also named NFL Defensive Player of the Year in 2007 and also played for the San Diego Chargers in his final season in 2011.

Sanders was nicknamed "the Sandman" because of his hard hits and tackles, and was also called "the Eraser" by former Colts' coach Tony Dungy because of his tendency to erase the mistakes of his teammates. He spent the majority of his career battling injuries, having played more than six games in a single season only twice, in 2005 and 2007.

== Early life ==
Sanders attended Central Tech High School as a freshman before transferring to Cathedral Preparatory School in Erie, Pennsylvania and was a student and a letterman in football as a running back and as a safety. In football, he was a four-year letterman, a two-time All-Conference selection. As a junior, he was a third-team All-State selection. As a senior, he was a team captain, and a first-team All-State selection and finished his senior season with 900 rushing yards and 17 touchdowns while leading his team to a 13–1 record and a trip to the state championship game, where they suffered a last second defeat to two-time defending champions Central Bucks West.

Sanders graduated from Cathedral Preparatory School in 2000. He also kick boxed during his childhood.

== College career ==
Sanders was offered an athletic scholarship to attend the University of Iowa, and play for the Iowa Hawkeyes football team based on a recommendation to head coach Kirk Ferentz from Joe Moore. Sanders played as a freshman and was named honorable mention All-Big Ten. Sanders was named to three All-Big Ten teams. He was named second-team All-American as a senior. At Iowa, Sanders improved his 40-yard run time from 4.6 to 4.3 seconds and his vertical jump from 30 to 44 inches. While at Iowa Sanders earned the nickname "Hit Man" for his physical style of play and big hits. In his last game at Kinnick Stadium, Sanders forced three fumbles including a fumble at the goal line.

== Professional career ==
Pre-draft measurables
| Height | Weight | Arm length | Hand span | 40-yard dash | 10-yard split | 20-yard split | 20-yard shuttle | Three-cone drill | Vertical jump | Broad jump | Bench press |
|---|---|---|---|---|---|---|---|---|---|---|---|
| 5 ft 8 3/8 in (1.74 m) | 204 lb (93 kg) | 29 3/4 in (0.76 m) | 8 7/8 in (0.23 m) | 4.40 s | 1.54 s | 2.54 s | 3.91 s | 6.70 s | 41.5 in (1.05 m) | 10 ft 8 in (3.25 m) | 15 reps |
All values from NFL Combine

=== Indianapolis Colts ===
==== 2004 ====
As a rookie, Sanders played primarily as a backup safety and a special teams player. Though his season would be shortened by both foot and knee injuries, he had some good performances during the regular season; on November 14, he made 13 total tackles while returning a fumble recovery 37 yards for his first NFL touchdown against the Houston Texans during their week 10 matchup. He managed 9 tackles and a fumble recovery against the Kansas City Chiefs for week 8.

==== 2005–2006 ====
Sanders played only four games in the 2006 regular season due to a knee injury he suffered early. In those four games, he racked up 27 tackles. He was soon dubbed "the Eraser", due to his reckless and punishing hits on opposing players which prevented many of the big plays that the opposing teams might have otherwise made happen. The Colts had the worst rushing defense in the NFL statistically, allowing at least 100 yards rushing in every game. During the playoffs, however, Sanders continued his comeback from injury, and breathed new life into the defense. With Sanders, the 2006 Colts had the second best run defense in the playoffs with only 73.3 rushing yards allowed per game. Sanders went on to help the Colts on the road to their victory in Super Bowl XLI. Sanders made a pivotal play in the AFC title game against the New England Patriots. With the Patriots looking to clinch the game with a first down with under three minutes to play and holding a 34–31 lead, Sanders dove in front of Patriots wide receiver Troy Brown and deflected the pass, forcing the Patriots to punt and giving Peyton Manning the chance to drive for the game-winning touchdown.

Sanders made several key plays in the Super Bowl against the Chicago Bears, forcing a fumble from running back Cedric Benson early in the game and intercepting quarterback Rex Grossman early in the 4th quarter after cornerback Kelvin Hayden intercepted Grossman on the previous drive with both picks helping seal the 29–17 win.

==== 2007: Defensive Player of the Year ====
For the 2007 NFL season Sanders was named AFC Defensive Player of the Week for Week 2, following the 11 tackles and 2.5 sacks he recorded against division rival Tennessee Titans at Nashville. He was largely responsible for shutting down Vince Young at the end of the game, clinching the victory for the Colts 22–20. Sanders ended the year with 96 total tackles, 3.5 sacks, two interceptions and six pass deflections. With him in the lineup, the Colts again fielded one of the best pass defenses in the league while also leading a successful run stopping defense. Sanders was noted by coach Tony Dungy as a prototypical safety for his Tampa 2 defense and became known for his coming down into the box on run support as a big factor in the Colts' run defense.

On December 28, 2007, Sanders was signed to a five-year, $37.5 million contract with $20 million guaranteed. At the time, the contract made him the highest paid safety in the history of the NFL.

On January 7, 2008, Sanders was named AP Defensive Player of the Year for the 2007 NFL season, the first Colt to earn the award and only the fourth safety in NFL history to win it. He earned 31 votes from a nationwide panel of 50 media members who regularly cover the NFL. With Sanders in the lineup, the Colts became stingier and more physical as Sanders played closer to the line of scrimmage. Sanders received much of the credit for the turnaround in Indy's soft defense, which saw its yards per carry average cut from 5.3 in 2006 to 3.8 in 2007.

==== 2008–2011 ====
Sanders was expected to start the 2008 training camp on the PUP list, but general manager Bill Polian had stated that Sanders would come back in the middle of training camp. On August 24, Sanders made his 2008 debut, along with fellow injured teammate Dwight Freeney in the week 3 preseason matchup against the Buffalo Bills.

On September 17, 2008, the Colts announced Bob Sanders would be out for the next 4–6 weeks because of a high ankle sprain. The injury occurred in the Colts' second game of the season against the Minnesota Vikings. Sanders would be replaced by second-year safety Melvin Bullitt.

Sanders made his return from the injury list, along with teammate Joseph Addai, for the week 9 matchup against the Patriots. After a five-game absence, Sanders had a solid performance and helped hold the Patriots off in the last seconds with the game-sealing interception with 4 minutes to go in the 4th quarter, his first interception of the season. During the postgame press conference, Tony Dungy stated that Sanders was "physically, very [very] close to 100%" coming off of the ankle injury.

Sanders again missed time for the season, sitting out of the week 11 game versus the Houston Texans, due to a knee injury apparently sustained the previous week against the Pittsburgh Steelers. The knee injury caused him to again miss time for the second consecutive week. Sanders' knee injuries came about by the cause of swelling, a condition that he experienced since a serious injury to his knee sidelined him during his rookie season.

After missing the last two games of the regular season, Sanders total game appearances amounted to six. In those six games, he collected 39 total tackles and one interception. Sanders played in the postseason but the Colts' season was cut short by the San Diego Chargers in their wild card playoff matchup, losing 23–17.

In 2009, Sanders started two games before being placed on injured reserve on November 6 with an arm injury. He recorded six tackles and one interception in his two games.

In 2010, Sanders exited the first game of the season with an injury. On September 14, 2010, it was reported that Sanders could possibly miss the entire season with a torn biceps tendon. On December 8, he was put on injured reserve, which ended his season.

On February 18, 2011, Sanders was released from the Colts after only playing nine total games in the previous three seasons. In a team statement he said, "I want to thank Mr. (Jim) Irsay for the opportunity to play with the Colts. I appreciate all he and the organization did for me throughout my career, and I always will consider myself a Colt. I want to thank the fans also for their great support. They played a big part in making my seven years with the team very rewarding."

=== San Diego Chargers ===
Sanders signed a one-year deal with the San Diego Chargers for the 2011 season. On September 28, 2011, he was placed on injured reserve (IR) due to swelling in his knee after playing the Patriots a couple of weeks earlier. It was the fourth season in a row Sanders ended the season on IR.

== NFL career statistics ==
Legend
| | Won the Super Bowl |
| | NFL Defensive Player of the Year |
| **Bold** | Career high |

| General | | Games | | Tackles | | | | Interceptions | | | | | | Fumbles | |
| Year | Team | GP | GS | Comb | Solo | Ast | Sck | PD | Int | Yds | Avg | Lng | TD | FF | FR |
|---|---|---|---|---|---|---|---|---|---|---|---|---|---|---|---|
| 2004 | IND | 6 | 4 | 34 | 29 | 5 | 0.0 | 1 | — | — | 0.0 | — | **1** | 0 | **2** |
| 2005 | IND | 14 | 14 | 91 | **71** | 20 | 0.0 | 4 | 1 | 0 | 0.0 | 0 | 0 | **1** | 1 |
| 2006 | IND | 4 | 4 | 27 | 19 | 8 | 0.0 | 2 | 1 | 0 | 0.0 | 0 | 0 | **1** | 0 |
| **2007** | IND | 15 | 15 | **96** | **71** | **25** | **3.5** | **6** | **2** | **32** | 16.0 | **29** | 0 | 0 | 1 |
| 2008 | IND | 6 | 6 | 39 | 25 | 14 | 0.0 | 2 | 1 | 0 | 0.0 | 0 | 0 | 0 | 0 |
| 2009 | IND | 2 | 2 | 3 | 2 | 1 | 0.0 | 1 | 1 | 29 | **29.0** | **29** | 0 | 0 | 0 |
| 2010 | IND | 1 | 1 | — | — | — | — | — | — | — | 0.0 | — | — | 0 | 0 |
| 2011 | SD | 2 | 2 | 12 | 7 | 5 | 0.0 | 0 | — | — | 0.0 | — | — | 0 | 0 |
| Career | | 50 | 48 | 302 | 224 | 78 | 3.5 | 16 | 6 | 61 | 10.2 | 29 | 1 | 2 | 4 |
