= Tim Jennings =

American football player (born 1983)

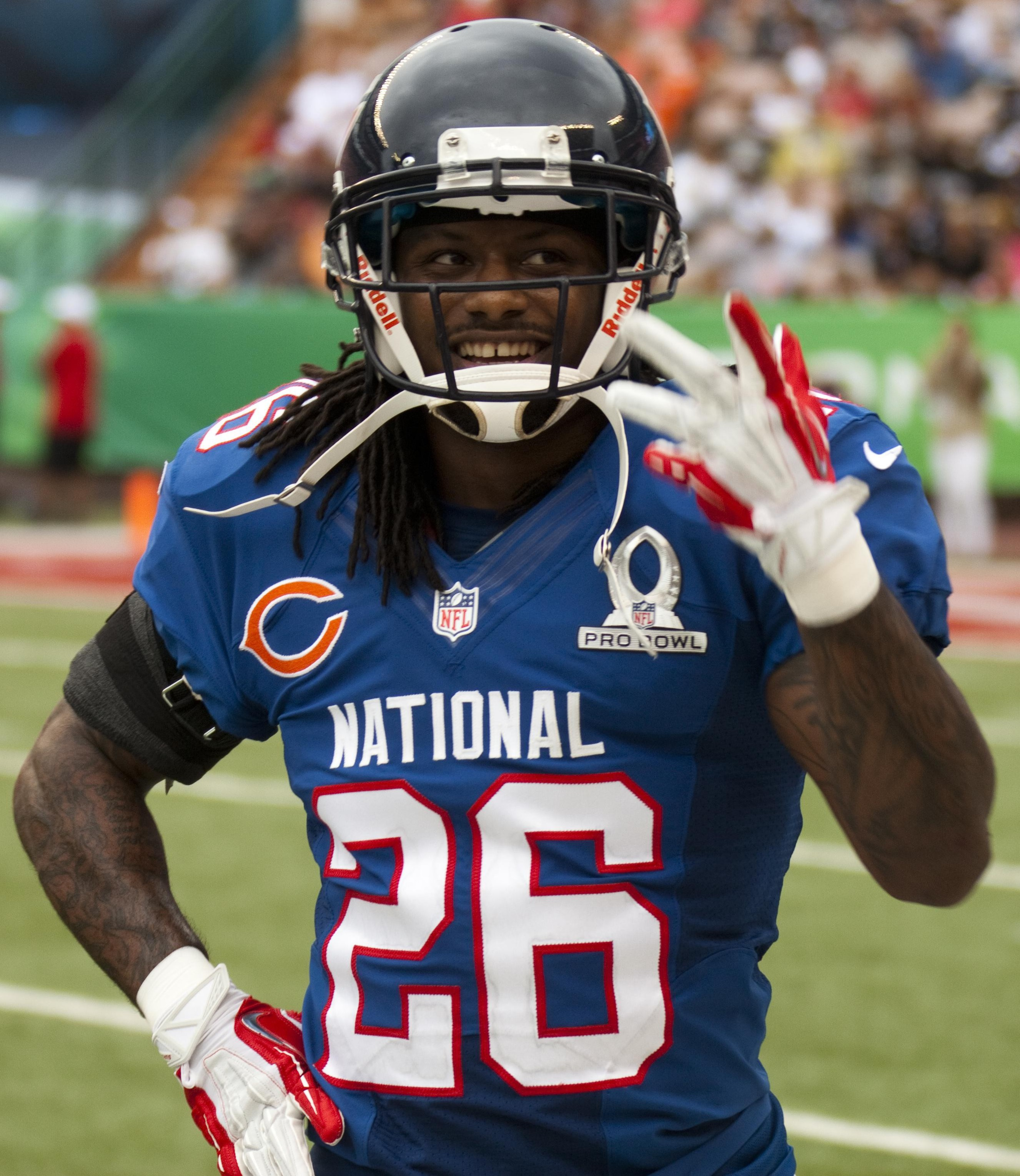
- Jennings at the 2013 Pro Bowl

No. 27, 23, 26, 28
- Position: Cornerback

Personal information
- Born: December 24, 1983 (age 42); Orangeburg, South Carolina, U.S.
- Listed height: 5 ft 8 in (1.73 m)
- Listed weight: 185 lb (84 kg)

Career information
- High school: Orangeburg-Wilkinson
- College: Georgia (2002–2005)
- NFL draft: 2006: 2nd round, 62nd overall pick

Career history

Playing
- Indianapolis Colts (2006–2009); Chicago Bears (2010–2014); Tampa Bay Buccaneers (2015)

Coaching
- Denmark High School (GA) (2021–present)

Awards and highlights
- Super Bowl champion (XLI); Second-team All-Pro (2012); 2× Pro Bowl (2012, 2013); NFL interceptions leader (2012); First-team All-SEC (2005)

Career NFL statistics
- Total tackles: 480
- Forced fumbles: 8
- Fumble recoveries: 7
- Pass deflections: 79
- Interceptions: 20
- Defensive touchdowns: 3
- Stats at Pro Football Reference

Timothy DeShawn Jennings (born December 24, 1983) is an American former professional football player who was a cornerback in the National Football League (NFL). He played college football for the Georgia Bulldogs, and was selected by the Indianapolis Colts in the second round of the 2006 NFL draft.

Jennings also played for the Chicago Bears and Tampa Bay Buccaneers. He won Super Bowl XLI with the Colts.

== Professional career ==
Pre-draft measurables
| Height | Weight | Arm length | Hand span | 40-yard dash | 10-yard split | 20-yard split | 20-yard shuttle | Vertical jump | Broad jump | Bench press |
|---|---|---|---|---|---|---|---|---|---|---|
| 5 ft 7 3/4 in (1.72 m) | 185 lb (84 kg) | 29 3/4 in (0.76 m) | 9 1/8 in (0.23 m) | 4.38 s | 1.46 s | 2.54 s | 4.34 s | 37.5 in (0.95 m) | 9 ft 9 in (2.97 m) | 17 reps |
All values from NFL Combine/Pro Day

=== Indianapolis Colts ===
Jennings was selected by the Indianapolis Colts in the 2006 NFL draft, and was a member of the Super Bowl XLI champion team as a rookie. From 2006 to 2009, Jennings recorded four interceptions and played in 53 games.

=== Chicago Bears ===
==== 2010 ====
Jennings signed with the Chicago Bears in free agency and earned a starting position in coach Lovie Smith's defense. In 2010 against the Buffalo Bills, Jennings returned an interception for a touchdown to lead the Bears a 22–19 victory.

Jennings was part of the team that advanced to the 2010 NFC Championship Game, ultimately falling just short of a berth in Super Bowl XLV.

==== 2011 ====
During a middling 2011 season, Jennings was benched by the Bears coaching staff after a poor game against the Seattle Seahawks in Week 15. However, Jennings rebounded and eventually developed into one of the best cover corners in the NFL. During his time in Chicago, Jennings and hard-hitting Charles Tillman formed one of the best cornerback tandems in the league.

==== 2012 ====
In March 2012, Jennings was re-signed to a 2-year contract, and was later reunited with former Colts teammate Kelvin Hayden. Against his former team in the season opener, Jennings intercepted first-overall draft pick Andrew Luck twice, marking the first time in Jennings's career that he recorded two interceptions in a single game. He also forced another interception by deflecting Luck's pass to safety Chris Conte. The following week, Jennings recorded five tackles, two passes defended, and intercepted Aaron Rodgers in a 23–10 loss to the Packers. After week three of the 2012 season against the St. Louis Rams, Jennings became the first Bears player to record an interception in four consecutive games (dating back to the 2011 season finale) since Dave Duerson in 1986. Jennings was later named the NFC Defensive Player of the Month for September. His seven interceptions led the NFL. In Week 13 against the Seattle Seahawks, Jennings sustained a shoulder injury, and was ruled out of the following game against the Minnesota Vikings. Jennings was replaced by former Colts teammate Kelvin Hayden. As of Week 16, Jennings led the Bears with 15 pass breakups, and his three games with more than one interception is a team record. On December 26, Jennings was named to his first career Pro Bowl. Jennings finished the season with nine interceptions, leading the league, making him the first Bears player since Mark Carrier in 1990 to lead the league in interceptions. Jennings was later named to the second team of the 2012 All-Pro Team, his first.

==== 2013 ====
In 2013, Jennings recorded a team-leading four interceptions, the second-most in his career, behind 2012's nine interceptions. In the past two seasons, Jennings has recorded 13 interceptions, the second-most in the league behind Richard Sherman's 16. Jennings was an unrestricted free agent for the 2014 season until January 2, 2014, when he was re-signed by the Bears to a 4-year contract. On January 20, 2014, Jennings was named to the Pro Bowl roster to replace Richard Sherman, becoming the second Bears cornerback to make two consecutive Pro Bowls, after Tillman in 2011–12.

==== 2015 ====
On August 30, 2015, Jennings was released by the Bears.

=== Tampa Bay Buccaneers ===
Jennings signed with the Buccaneers on September 3, 2015. Jennings was released from the Buccaneers on November 9, 2015.

== NFL career statistics ==
Legend
| | Led the league |
| **Bold** | Career high |

=== Regular season ===
| Year | Team | Games | | Tackles | | | | | Interceptions | | | | | Fumbles | | | |
| Year | Team | GP | GS | Cmb | Solo | Ast | Sck | TFL | Int | Yds | TD | Lng | PD | FF | FR | Yds | TD |
|---|---|---|---|---|---|---|---|---|---|---|---|---|---|---|---|---|---|
| 2006 | IND | 11 | 0 | 7 | 7 | 0 | 0.0 | 0 | 0 | 0 | 0 | 0 | 0 | 0 | 0 | 0 | 0 |
| 2007 | IND | 11 | 4 | 31 | 30 | 1 | 0.0 | 1 | 0 | 0 | 0 | 0 | 3 | 1 | 0 | 0 | 0 |
| 2008 | IND | **16** | 12 | 66 | 51 | **15** | 0.0 | 3 | 2 | 9 | 0 | 6 | 7 | **2** | **2** | 0 | 0 |
| 2009 | IND | 15 | 5 | 57 | 44 | 13 | 0.0 | 2 | 2 | 13 | 0 | 13 | 10 | 0 | 0 | 0 | 0 |
| 2010 | CHI | **16** | 13 | 56 | 41 | **15** | 0.0 | 2 | 1 | 39 | 0 | 39 | 7 | 1 | 1 | 0 | 0 |
| 2011 | CHI | **16** | 15 | **77** | **69** | 8 | 0.0 | **4** | 2 | 2 | 0 | 1 | 10 | 1 | 1 | 0 | 0 |
| 2012 | CHI | 14 | 14 | 60 | 55 | 5 | 0.0 | 1 | **9** | 105 | 1 | 31 | **21** | 0 | 0 | 0 | 0 |
| 2013 | CHI | **16** | **16** | 58 | 50 | 8 | 0.0 | 0 | 4 | **111** | **2** | **48** | 13 | **2** | 1 | 0 | 0 |
| 2014 | CHI | **16** | **16** | 51 | 37 | 14 | 0.0 | 2 | 0 | 0 | 0 | 0 | 7 | 1 | 1 | **17** | 0 |
| 2015 | TAM | 6 | 3 | 17 | 12 | 5 | 0.0 | 1 | 0 | 0 | 0 | 0 | 1 | 0 | 1 | 0 | 0 |
| Career | | 137 | 98 | 480 | 396 | 84 | 0.0 | 16 | 20 | 279 | 3 | 48 | 79 | 8 | 7 | 17 | 0 |

=== Playoffs ===
| Year | Team | Games | | Tackles | | | | | Interceptions | | | | | Fumbles | | | |
| Year | Team | GP | GS | Cmb | Solo | Ast | Sck | TFL | Int | Yds | TD | Lng | PD | FF | FR | Yds | TD |
|---|---|---|---|---|---|---|---|---|---|---|---|---|---|---|---|---|---|
| 2007 | IND | 1 | 0 | 2 | 2 | 0 | 0.0 | 0 | 0 | 0 | 0 | 0 | 1 | 0 | 0 | 0 | 0 |
| 2008 | IND | 1 | 1 | 7 | 6 | 1 | 0.0 | 0 | 0 | 0 | 0 | 0 | **2** | **1** | 0 | 0 | 0 |
| 2009 | IND | **3** | 0 | 2 | 2 | 0 | 0.0 | 0 | 0 | 0 | 0 | 0 | 0 | 0 | 0 | 0 | 0 |
| 2010 | CHI | 2 | **2** | **10** | **7** | **3** | 0.0 | 0 | 0 | 0 | 0 | 0 | **2** | 0 | 0 | 0 | 0 |
| Career | | 7 | 3 | 21 | 17 | 4 | 0.0 | 0 | 0 | 0 | 0 | 0 | 5 | 1 | 0 | 0 | 0 |

== Coaching career ==
After his playing career, he became the defensive backs coach at Denmark High School.

== Personal life ==
Jennings is the younger cousin of former NFL cornerback Donnie Abraham.
