= 2006 Indianapolis Colts season =

54th season in franchise history; second Super Bowl win

- Owner: Jim Irsay
- General manager: Bill Polian
- Head coach: Tony Dungy
- Offensive coordinator: Tom Moore
- Defensive coordinator: Ron Meeks
- Home stadium: RCA Dome

Results
- Record: 12–4
- Division place: 1st AFC South
- Playoffs: Won Wild Card Playoffs (vs. Chiefs) 23–8; Won Divisional Playoffs (at Ravens) 15–6; Won AFC Championship (vs. Patriots) 38–34; Won Super Bowl XLI (vs. Bears) 29–17
- All-Pros: 3: WR Marvin Harrison (1st team); QB Peyton Manning (2nd team); C Jeff Saturday (2nd team)
- Pro Bowlers: 5: QB Peyton Manning; WR Marvin Harrison; WR Reggie Wayne; OT Tarik Glenn; C Jeff Saturday

Uniform
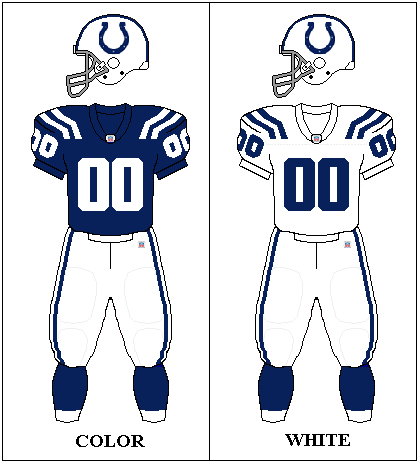

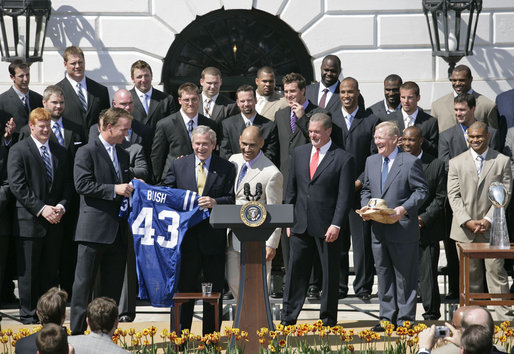
President George W. Bush congratulates the Colts

The 2006 Indianapolis Colts season was the franchise's 54th season in the National Football League (NFL), the 23rd in Indianapolis and the 5th season under head coach Tony Dungy. The team failed to improve on their regular season record of 14–2 from the 2005 season, finishing at 12–4. However, they did improve upon their postseason performance and advanced further into the playoffs, winning Super Bowl XLI.

For the fourth consecutive season, the Colts had won 12 or more games. They also won the AFC South for the fourth time in a row, and they defeated the Kansas City Chiefs in the Wild Card round and the Baltimore Ravens in the Divisional round, before winning the AFC Championship, beating the New England Patriots 38–34 to advance to Super Bowl XLI, in which they dominated the Chicago Bears, winning 29–17 on February 4, 2007, at Dolphin Stadium. This was the franchise's first Super Bowl since Super Bowl V in 1970, and first since relocating to Indianapolis, as well as their fourth title in their history (1958, 1959, 1970, and 2006). They were just the second football team in a domed stadium to win the Super Bowl after the 1999 St. Louis Rams.

The 2006 Colts surrendered 5.33 rushing yards per attempt, by far the worst since the merger, and seventh-worst in NFL history. Still, the Colts won the championship with the help of the most statistically efficient offense in the league. During this season, the Colts, who were very successful in the 2000s despite being impacted by the Patriots dynasty, made history by becoming the first team that played in an indoor stadium to win a Super Bowl in an outdoor stadium and for helping Tony Dungy to become the first African American coach to win a Super Bowl. In 2019, the NFL ranked the 2006 Colts as the 37th-best NFL team of all time.

This was also the first season the Colts started games at the same local time with other teams in the Eastern Time Zone, as the State of Indiana began observing Daylight Saving Time earlier in the year.

== Offseason ==
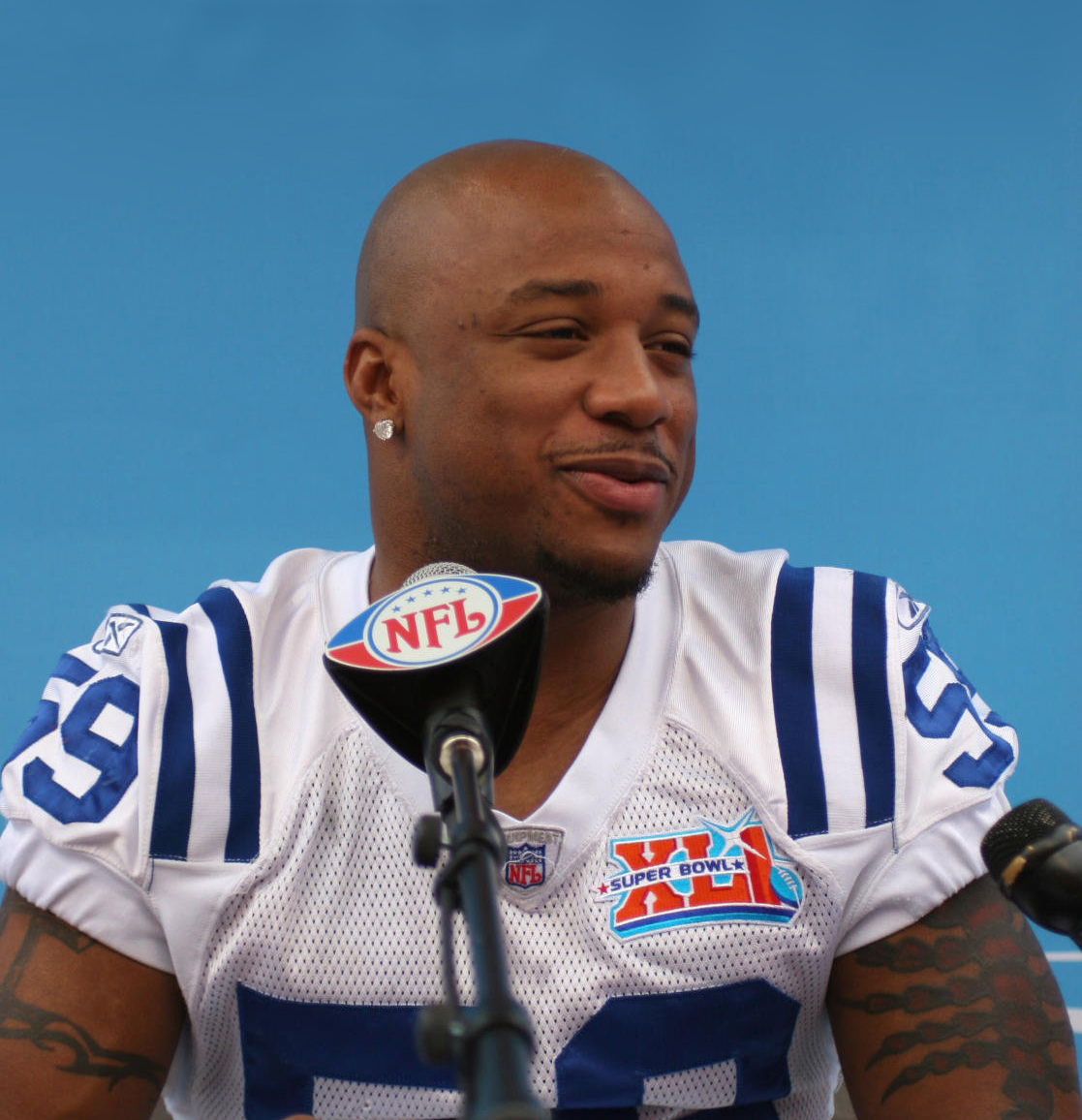
Cato June, who was the 2006 Colts leading tackler, at a Super Bowl XLI press conference

The offseason marked the dissolution of the trio of Edgerrin James, Peyton Manning, and Marvin Harrison, affectionately nicknamed the "Triplets" by Colts fans. While the latter two signed long-term contracts, James' contract expired at the end of the 2005 season. He signed with the Arizona Cardinals in the off-season as a free-agent. Other key losses included Larry Tripplett (Buffalo Bills, free-agent) and David Thornton (Tennessee Titans, free-agent). The Colts opted not to re-sign kicker Mike Vanderjagt, instead inking ex-New England Patriots kicker Adam Vinatieri to a lucrative deal. Former Tampa Bay Buccaneers quarterback Shaun King was signed to compete with Jim Sorgi for the backup quarterback position, but was later cut and replaced with Josh Betts.

== 2006 NFL draft ==
2006 Indianapolis Colts draft
Round	Pick	Player	Position	College	Notes
1	30	Joseph Addai *	RB	LSU	
2	62	Tim Jennings *	CB	Georgia	
3	94	Freddy Keiaho	LB	San Diego State	
5	162	Michael Toudouze	OG	TCU	
6	199	Charlie Johnson	OT	Oklahoma State	
6	207	Antoine Bethea *	S	Howard	Compensatory selection
7	238	T. J. Rushing	CB	Stanford	from Tennessee via Indianapolis
Made roster * Made at least one Pro Bowl during career

=== Undrafted free agents ===
2006 undrafted free agents of note
Player	Position	College
Josh Betts	Quarterback	Miami
Daniel Federkeil	Tackle	Calgary

== Staff ==
Indianapolis Colts 2006 coaching staff
Front office: Owner/CEO – James Irsay; President – Bill Polian; Senior executive vice president – Pete Ward; Executive vice president – Bob Terpening; Vice president of football operations – Chris Polian; Director of player personnel – Tom Telesco; Director of pro player personnel – Clyde Powers; Head coaches: Head coach – Tony Dungy; Assistant head coach/quarterbacks – Jim Caldwell; Offensive coaches: Offensive coordinator – Tom Moore; Running backs – Gene Huey; Wide receivers – Clyde Christensen; Tight ends – Ricky Thomas; Offensive line – Howard Mudd; Offensive quality control – Pete Metzelaars	Defensive coaches: Defensive coordinator – Ron Meeks; Defensive line – John Teerlinck; Linebackers – Mike Murphy; Defensive backs – Alan Williams; Special assistant to the defense – Rod Perry; Defensive assistant – Bill Teerlinck; Defensive quality control – Carlos Woods; Special teams coaches: Special teams – Russ Purnell; Strength and conditioning: Strength and conditioning – Jon Torine; Assistant strength and conditioning – Richard Howell

== Roster ==
Indianapolis Colts 2006 final roster
Quarterbacks: 18 Peyton Manning; 12 Jim Sorgi; Running backs: 29 Joseph Addai; 30 DeDe Dorsey; 33 Dominic Rhodes; Wide receivers: 88 Marvin Harrison; 85 Aaron Moorehead; 11 Ricky Proehl; 84 John Standeford; 87 Reggie Wayne; 10 Terrence Wilkins KR/PR; Tight ends: 44 Dallas Clark; 81 Bryan Fletcher; 86 Ben Utecht	Offensive linemen: 71 Ryan Diem T; 76 Daniel Federkeil T; 57 Dylan Gandy G; 78 Tarik Glenn T; 74 Charlie Johnson T; 65 Ryan Lilja G; 63 Jeff Saturday C; 73 Jake Scott G; 69 Matt Ulrich G; Defensive linemen: 79 Raheem Brock DT; 93 Dwight Freeney DE; 61 Dan Klecko DT; 98 Robert Mathis DE; 92 Anthony McFarland DT; 95 Darrell Reid DE/DT; 64 Bo Schobel DE; 91 Josh Thomas DE	Linebackers: 50 Rocky Boiman OLB; 58 Gary Brackett MLB; 51 Gilbert Gardner OLB; 56 Tyjuan Hagler OLB; 59 Cato June OLB; 54 Freddy Keiaho OLB; 99 Ryan LaCasse OLB; 94 Rob Morris MLB/OLB; 53 Keith O'Neil OLB; Defensive backs: 41 Antoine Bethea FS/SS; 42 Jason David CB; 43 Matt Giordano FS; 25 Nick Harper CB; 26 Kelvin Hayden CB; 28 Marlin Jackson FS; 27 Tim Jennings CB; 36 Dexter Reid SS; 34 T. J. Rushing CB/KR/PR; 21 Bob Sanders SS; Special teams: 17 Hunter Smith P; 48 Justin Snow LS; 4 Adam Vinatieri K	Reserve lists: 47 Jerome Collins TE (IR); 20 Mike Doss S (IR); 96 Johnathan Goddard DE (IR); 23 James Mungro RB (IR); 55 Kendyll Pope LB (Susp.); 90 Montae Reagor DT (NF-Inj.); 97 Corey Simon DT (NF-Inj.); 83 Brandon Stokley WR (IR); 99 Jonathan Welsh DE (IR); Practice squad: 15 Devin Aromashodu WR; 9 Josh Betts QB; 62 Albert Bimper C; 72 Vincent Burns DT (IR); 31 Kory Chapman RB; 39 Tanard Davis CB; 49 Aaron Halterman TE; 45 Luke Lawton FB; 75 Michael Toudouze T; rookies in italics 53 active, 10 inactive, 8 practice squad

== Preseason ==
Week	Date	Opponent	Result	Record	Venue	Recap
1	August 10	at St. Louis Rams	L 17–19	0–1	Edward Jones Dome	Recap
2	August 20	Seattle Seahawks	L 17–30	0–2	RCA Dome	Recap
3	August 26	at New Orleans Saints	W 27–14	1–2	Mississippi Veterans Memorial Stadium	Recap
4	September 1	Cincinnati Bengals	L 3–20	1–3	RCA Dome	Recap

== Regular season ==
=== Schedule ===
Week	Date	Opponent	Result	Record	Venue	Recap
1	September 10	at New York Giants	**W** 26–21	1–0	Giants Stadium	Recap
2	September 17	**Houston Texans**	**W** 43–24	2–0	RCA Dome	Recap
3	September 24	**Jacksonville Jaguars**	**W** 21–14	3–0	RCA Dome	Recap
4	October 1	at New York Jets	**W** 31–28	4–0	Giants Stadium	Recap
5	October 8	**Tennessee Titans**	**W** 14–13	5–0	RCA Dome	Recap
6	Bye					
7	October 22	Washington Redskins	**W** 36–22	6–0	RCA Dome	Recap
8	October 29	at Denver Broncos	**W** 34–31	7–0	Invesco Field at Mile High	Recap
9	November 5	at New England Patriots	**W** 27–20	8–0	Gillette Stadium	Recap
10	November 12	Buffalo Bills	**W** 17–16	9–0	RCA Dome	Recap
11	November 19	at Dallas Cowboys	**L** 14–21	9–1	Texas Stadium	Recap
12	November 26	Philadelphia Eagles	**W** 45–21	10–1	RCA Dome	Recap
13	December 3	at **Tennessee Titans**	**L** 17–20	10–2	LP Field	Recap
14	December 10	at **Jacksonville Jaguars**	**L** 17–44	10–3	Alltel Stadium	Recap
15	December 18	Cincinnati Bengals	**W** 34–16	11–3	RCA Dome	Recap
16	December 24	at **Houston Texans**	**L** 24–27	11–4	Reliant Stadium	Recap
17	December 31	Miami Dolphins	**W** 27–22	12–4	RCA Dome	Recap

Note: Intra-division opponents are in bold text.

=== Game summaries ===
==== Week 1: at New York Giants ====
Week 1: Indianapolis Colts at New York Giants – Game summary

Quarter	1	2	3	4	Total
**Colts**	3	13	0	10	**26**
Giants	0	7	7	7	**21**

at Giants Stadium, East Rutherford, New Jersey

- Date: September 10
- Game time: 8:15 p.m. EDT
- Game weather: Cloudy, 71 °F (22 °C)
- Game attendance: 78,622
- Referee: Walt Anderson
- TV announcers (NBC): Al Michaels and John Madden
- Box score

Game information

**First quarter**

- IND – Adam Vinatieri 26-yard field goal, 6:07. Colts 3–0. **Drive: 17 plays, 58 yards, 8:53.**

**Second quarter**

- IND – Adam Vinatieri 32-yard field goal, 12:23. Colts 6–0. **Drive: 11 plays, 51 yards, 3:25.**
- IND – Dallas Clark 2-yard pass from Peyton Manning (Adam Vinatieri kick), 2:25. Colts 13–0. **Drive: 10 plays, 70 yards, 4:47.**
- NYG – Plaxico Burress 34-yard pass from Eli Manning (Jay Feely kick), 0:32. Colts 13–7. **Drive: 8 plays, 86 yards, 1:53.**
- IND – Adam Vinatieri 48-yard field goal, 0:00. Colts 16–7. **Drive: 5 plays, 31 yards, 0:32.**

**Third quarter**

- NYG – Jeremy Shockey 15-yard pass from Eli Manning (Jay Feely kick), 7:10. Colts 16–14. **Drive: 11 plays, 69 yards, 7:50.**

**Fourth quarter**

- IND – Dominic Rhodes 1-yard run (Adam Vinatieri kick), 13:13. Colts 23–14. **Drive: 8 plays, 21 yards, 3:18.**
- NYG – Brandon Jacobs 1-yard run (Jay Feely kick), 8:01. Colts 23–21. **Drive: 11 plays, 78 yards, 5:12.**
- IND – Adam Vinatieri 32-yard field goal, 1:12. Colts 26–21. **Drive: 7 plays, 19 yards, 2:39.**

**Top passers**

- IND – Peyton Manning – 25/41, 276 yards, TD, INT
- NYG – Eli Manning – 20/34, 247 yards, 2 TD, INT

**Top rushers**

- IND – Dominic Rhodes – 16 rushes, 29 yards, TD
- NYG – Tiki Barber – 18 rushes, 110 yards

**Top receivers**

- IND – Marvin Harrison – 9 receptions, 113 yards
- NYG – Plaxico Burress – 4 receptions, 80 yards, TD

Indianapolis opened the regular season on the road against the New York Giants on September 10, 2006. In a much-hyped and highly anticipated matchup dubbed "The Manning Bowl", Colts QB Peyton Manning led the Colts against the Giants and QB Eli Manning, who is his younger brother. This contest marked the first time in NFL history that two brothers started at QB opposite one another. On an opening drive that lasted nearly nine minutes, the Colts went 58 yards on 17 plays, only to be held to a 26-yard Adam Vinatieri field goal in his first regular-season appearance as a Colt. Indianapolis scored again on another Vinatieri field goal, this one a 32-yarder, before finally finding the endzone on a 2-yard pass from Peyton Manning to TE Dallas Clark. The Giants trimmed the Colts' lead on a 34-yard touchdown pass from Eli Manning to WR Plaxico Burress, though the Colts responded promptly with another field goal before the half expired. The Giants struck first in the third quarter with another touchdown pass from Eli Manning, this time 15 yards to TE Jeremy Shockey. It proved to be too little too late, however, as the Colts increased their lead on a 1-yard touchdown run by RB Dominic Rhodes. A 1-yard touchdown run by Giants RB Brandon Jacobs made the game interesting in the final minutes, but Indianapolis responded with one last field goal and timely defensive plays down the stretch, and were able to seal the victory.

==== Week 2: vs. Houston Texans ====
Week 2: Houston Texans at Indianapolis Colts – Game summary

Quarter	1	2	3	4	Total
Texans	0	3	0	21	**24**
**Colts**	14	6	10	13	**43**

at RCA Dome, Indianapolis, Indiana

- Date: September 17
- Game time: 1:00 p.m. EST
- Game weather: None (played indoors)
- Game attendance: 56,614
- Referee: Jeff Triplette
- TV announcers (CBS): Kevin Harlan and Rich Gannon
- Box score

Game information

**First quarter**

- IND – Brandon Stokley 10-yard pass from Peyton Manning (Adam Vinatieri kick), 12:48. Colts 7–0. **Drive: 3 plays, 16 yards, 1:27.**
- IND – Joseph Addai 21-yard pass from Peyton Manning (Adam Vinatieri kick), 8:17. Colts 14–0. **Drive: 6 plays, 63 yards, 2:31.**

**Second quarter**

- IND – Adam Vinatieri 39-yard field goal, 6:02. Colts 17–0. **Drive: 8 plays, 44 yards, 3:16.**
- HOU – Kris Brown 43-yard field goal, 1:54. Colts 17–3. **Drive: 10 plays, 55 yards, 4:08.**
- IND – Adam Vinatieri 43-yard field goal, 0:00. Colts 20–3. **Drive: 9 plays, 44 yards, 1:54.**

**Third quarter**

- IND – Bryan Fletcher 15-yard pass from Peyton Manning (Adam Vinatieri kick), 8:07. Colts 27–3. **Drive: 13 plays, 82 yards, 6:53.**
- IND – Adam Vinatieri 38-yard field goal, 3:17. Colts 30–3. **Drive: 8 plays, 35 yards, 3:07.**

**Fourth quarter**

- HOU – Owen Daniels 33-yard pass from David Carr (Kris Brown kick), 11:36. Colts 30–10. **Drive: 7 plays, 80 yards, 2:35.**
- IND – Dominic Rhodes 2-yard run (Adam Vinatieri kick), 7:56. Colts 37–10. **Drive: 6 plays, 76 yards, 3:40.**
- HOU – Mark Bruener 1-yard pass from David Carr (Kris Brown kick), 5:12. Colts 37–17. **Drive: 6 plays, 64 yards, 2:44.**
- IND – Ran Carthon 3-yard run (kick failed), 2:28. Colts 43–17. **Drive: 9 plays, 65 yards, 2:44.**
- HOU – Andre Johnson 10-yard pass from David Carr (Kris Brown kick), 0:45. Colts 43–24. **Drive: 6 plays, 61 yards, 1:43.**

**Top passers**

- HOU – David Carr – 22/26, 219 yards, 3 TD
- IND – Peyton Manning – 26/38, 400 yards, 3 TD

**Top rushers**

- HOU – Ron Dayne – 11 rushes, 37 yards
- IND – Joseph Addai – 16 rushes, 82 yards

**Top receivers**

- HOU – Eric Moulds – 4 receptions, 59 yards
- IND – Reggie Wayne – 6 receptions, 135 yards

In their Week 2 home-opener against AFC South rival Houston, Indianapolis continued its offensive dominance by starting the game with a 10-yard touchdown pass from QB Peyton Manning to WR Brandon Stokley and a 21-yard touchdown pass from Manning to rookie running back Joseph Addai. In the second quarter, kicker Adam Vinatieri successfully converted a 39-yard field goal attempt to push the Colts' lead to 17–0. The Texans responded with a field goal of their own, but the Colts tacked on another field goal as time expired to end the half. The third quarter witnessed more scoring as Peyton Manning completed a touchdown drive on the first possession of the half, this one a 15-yard touchdown pass to TE Bryan Fletcher. Five minutes later, Adam Vinatieri converted another field goal for Indianapolis, this time from 38 yards out. Houston showed signs of life in the fourth quarter as QB David Carr completed a 33-yard touchdown pass to TE Owen Daniels. Indianapolis would respond, however, with a 2-yard touchdown run by RB Dominic Rhodes. The Texans answered on Carr's 1-yard touchdown pass to TE Mark Bruener, but the Colts scored yet again, this time on a 3-yard TD run by RB Ran Carthon. Houston scored one more time in the final moments as David Carr completed a 10-yard touchdown pass to WR Andre Johnson, but the game was never as close as the final score indicated. This victory improved the Colts' record against the Texans to 9–0. Also noteworthy, QB Peyton Manning surpassed Johnny Unitas for the most pass completions in franchise history. Manning accomplished this feat on his third completion of the game.

Peyton Manning finished the game 26 of 38 with 400 yards passing and three touchdowns. David Carr finished with 219 passing yards on 22 of 26 passes completed and also had three touchdown passes as well. Neither quarterback threw an interception, but Carr did fumble the football three times. Colts RB Joseph Addai finished the game with a career-high 82 rushing yards, and also had a touchdown reception. Peyton Manning was sacked twice in this game, and David Carr was sacked four times.

==== Week 3: vs. Jacksonville Jaguars ====
Week 3: Jacksonville Jaguars at Indianapolis Colts – Game summary

Quarter	1	2	3	4	Total
Jaguars	7	0	0	7	**14**
**Colts**	0	7	7	7	**21**

at RCA Dome, Indianapolis, Indiana

- Date: September 24
- Game time: 1:00 p.m. EDT
- Game weather: None (played indoors)
- Game attendance: 57,041
- Referee: Pete Morelli
- TV announcers (CBS): Greg Gumbel and Dan Dierdorf
- Box score

Game information

**First quarter**

- JAX – Byron Leftwich 4-yard run (Josh Scobee kick), 7:31. Jaguars 7–0. **Drive: 11 plays, 78 yards, 7:29.**

**Second quarter**

- IND – Terrence Wilkins 82-yard punt return (Martin Gramatica kick), 11:42. Tied 7–7.

**Third quarter**

- IND – Dallas Clark 30-yard pass from Peyton Manning (Martin Gramatica kick), 11:55. Colts 14–7. **Drive: 7 plays, 80 yards, 3:05.**

**Fourth quarter**

- IND – Peyton Manning 2-yard run (Martin Gramatica kick), 8:30. Colts 21–7. **Drive: 8 plays, 61 yards, 3:23.**
- JAX – Maurice Jones-Drew 7-yard pass from Byron Leftwich (Josh Scobee kick), 3:32. Colts 21–14. **Drive: 12 plays, 49 yards, 4:58.**

**Top passers**

- JAX – Byron Leftwich – 16/28, 107 yards, TD, 2 INT
- IND – Peyton Manning – 14/31, 219 yards, TD

**Top rushers**

- JAX – Maurice Jones-Drew – 13 rushes, 103 yards
- IND – Dominic Rhodes – 14 rushes, 48 yards

**Top receivers**

- JAX – Maurice Jones-Drew – 4 receptions, 32 yards, TD
- IND – Marvin Harrison – 6 receptions, 94 yards

Playing again in front of the home crowd, the Colts faced a big test in their AFC South rivals, the Jacksonville Jaguars. Jacksonville scored first on a 4-yard touchdown run by QB Byron Leftwich. The Colts were not able to respond until early in the second quarter when WR/PR Terrence Wilkins returned a punt 82 yards for a touchdown. Indianapolis grabbed the lead for the first time in the game during the third quarter on QB Peyton Manning's 30-yard touchdown pass to TE Dallas Clark. In the fourth quarter, Manning increased Indianapolis' lead on an uncharacteristic two-yard touchdown run. That score put the Colts up 21–7. The Jaguars, though, would get to within a touchdown late in the game on Byron Leftwich's 7-yard TD pass to RB Maurice Jones-Drew. That score, however, proved to be the last of the game as Indianapolis hung on for the victory, and improved their record to 3–0.

Quarterback Peyton Manning finished the game 14 of 31 with 219 passing yards for one touchdown pass, while Byron Leftwich finished 16 of 28 with 107 passing yards for one touchdown pass. Leftwich also threw two interceptions. RB Maurice Jones-Drew had 103 rushing yards for Jacksonville, and Marvin Harrison had 6 catches for 94 yards receiving. Jacksonville Kicker Josh Scobee missed both of his field goals, and they proved crucial in the game in the late stages.

==== Week 4: at New York Jets ====
Week 4: Indianapolis Colts at New York Jets – Game summary

Quarter	1	2	3	4	Total
**Colts**	7	7	0	17	**31**
Jets	0	14	0	14	**28**

at Giants Stadium, East Rutherford, New Jersey

- Date: October 1
- Game time: 1:00 p.m. EDT
- Game weather: Cloudy, 62 °F (17 °C)
- Game attendance: 77,190
- Referee: Gerry Austin
- TV announcers (CBS): Greg Gumbel and Dan Dierdorf
- Box score

Game information

**First quarter**

- IND – Dominic Rhodes 6-yard run (Martin Gramatica kick), 12:28. Colts 7–0. **Drive: 4 plays, 26 yards, 1:34.**

**Second quarter**

- NYJ – Jerricho Cotchery 33-yard pass from Chad Pennington (Mike Nugent kick), 10:10. Tied 7–7. **Drive: 5 plays, 65 yards, 3:12.**
- NYJ – Kevan Barlow 1-yard run (Mike Nugent kick), 4:44. Jets 14–7. **Drive: 11 plays, 50 yards, 5:26.**
- IND – Joseph Addai 2-yard run (Martin Gramatica kick), 0:16. Tied 14–14. **Drive: 11 plays, 85 yards, 4:28.**

**Third quarter**

- No scoring plays

**Fourth quarter**

- IND – Martin Gramatica 20-yard field goal, 12:58. Colts 17–14. **Drive: 15 plays, 78 yards, 6:33.**
- NYJ – Kevan Barlow 5-yard run (Mike Nugent kick), 7:55. Jets 21–17. **Drive: 11 plays, 62 yards, 5:03.**
- IND – Bryan Fletcher 2-yard pass from Peyton Manning (Marin Gramatica kick), 2:34. Colts 24–21. **Drive: 12 plays, 68 yards, 5:21.**
- NYJ – Justin Miller 103-yard kickoff return (Mike Nugent kick), 2:20. Jets 28–24.
- IND – Peyton Manning 1-yard run (Martin Gramatica kick), 0:50. Colts 31–28. **Drive: 9 plays, 56 yards, 1:30.**

**Top passers**

- IND – Peyton Manning – 21/30, 217 yards, TD
- NYJ – Chad Pennington – 17/23, 207 yards, TD, INT

**Top rushers**

- IND – Joseph Addai – 20 rushes, 84 yards, TD
- NYJ – Cedric Houston – 12 rushes, 49 yards

**Top receivers**

- IND – Marvin Harrison – 7 receptions, 79 yards
- NYJ – Laveranues Coles – 6 receptions, 81 yards

The Colts traveled to The Meadowlands for a showdown with the New York Jets. This would be the second time this season that the Colts played at Giants Stadium, as they played the New York Giants in the regular season opener. Indianapolis scored first on a 6-yard touchdown run by running back Dominic Rhodes. The second quarter, though, was taken over by the Jets as they tied the game on QB Chad Pennington's 33-yard touchdown pass to WR Jerricho Cotchery, and took the lead on RB Kevan Barlow's 1-yard touchdown run. The Colts tied the game just before halftime on a 2-yard touchdown run by rookie RB Joseph Addai. After a scoreless third quarter, kicker Martin Gramatica, filling in for the injured Adam Vinatieri, made a 20-yard field goal early in the fourth to give Indianapolis the lead, 17–14. But New York regained the lead, scoring on a Kevan Barlow 5-yard touchdown score. Colts QB Peyton Manning rallied the Colts on their next possession, leading them on a scoring drive that led to a 2-yard touchdown pass to TE Bryan Fletcher. Illustrating perfectly the back-and-forth nature of the contest, the lead changed hands once again as DB Justin Miller returned the ensuing kickoff 103 yards for a touchdown to quickly move all the momentum to New York's side. But Indianapolis took the setback in stride as Manning methodically marched the Colts up the field and scored the game's final points on a 1-yard quarterback sneak. Facing a long field and with only eight seconds on the clock, on the game's last play Chad Pennington completed a pass up the middle to RB Leon Washington, who lateraled the ball to wide receiver Brad Smith in a desperate attempt to score a touchdown reminiscent of "The Play" between Stanford University and the University of California. Five laterals and three fumbles later, the Colts ended any hope of a Jets miracle comeback by recovering the final fumble of the play as time expired.

Quarterback Peyton Manning finished the game 21 of 30 for 217 passing yards and one touchdown, Chad Pennington was 17 of 23 for 207 yards passing and had one touchdown pass and one interception. Manning was sacked twice while Pennington was sacked three times. Colts rookie running back Joseph Addai had a career-high 84 yards rushing as the Colts improved their record to 4–0.

==== Week 5: vs. Tennessee Titans ====
Week 5: Tennessee Titans at Indianapolis Colts – Game summary

Quarter	1	2	3	4	Total
Titans	7	3	3	0	**13**
**Colts**	0	0	7	7	**14**

at RCA Dome, Indianapolis, Indiana

- Date: October 8
- Game time: 1:00 p.m. EDT
- Game weather: None (played indoors)
- Game attendance: 57,021
- Referee: Mike Carey
- TV announcers (CBS): Don Criqui and Rich Baldinger
- Box score

Game information

**First quarter**

- TEN – Vince Young 19-yard run (Rob Bironas kick), 6:41. Titans 7–0. **Drive: 7 plays, 88 yards, 3:44.**

**Second quarter**

- TEN – Rob Bironas 22-yard field goal, 5:38. Titans 10–0. **Drive: 7 plays, 47 yards, 3:48.**

**Third quarter**

- IND – Marvin Harrison 13-yard pass from Peyton Manning (Martin Gramatica kick), 6:09. Titans 10–7. **Drive: 12 plays, 90 yards, 6:30.**
- TEN – Rob Bironas 47-yard field goal, 1:33. Titans 13–7. **Drive: 10 plays, 38 yards, 4:36.**

**Fourth quarter**

- IND – Reggie Wayne 2-yard pass from Peyton Manning (Martin Gramatica kick), 5:10. Colts 14–13. **Drive: 10 plays, 43 yards, 4:28.**

**Top passers**

- TEN – Vince Young – 10/21, 63 yards, INT
- IND – Peyton Manning – 20/31, 166 yards, 2 TD, INT

**Top rushers**

- TEN – Travis Henry – 19 rushes, 123 yards
- IND – Dominic Rhodes – 20 rushes, 84 yards

**Top receivers**

- TEN – Brandon Jones – 3 receptions, 40 yards
- IND – Brandon Stokley – 5 receptions, 57 yards

Following their close win against the Jets, the Colts returned home for a Week 5 matchup with AFC South rival Tennessee. The Titans took the lead early as rookie QB Vince Young ran 19 yards for a touchdown in what would be the first quarter's only score. In the second quarter, Tennessee expanded its lead to 10–0 on a 22-yard Rob Bironas field goal. Indianapolis cut the deficit with six minutes left in the third quarter on QB Peyton Manning's 13-yard touchdown strike to WR Marvin Harrison. However, Tennessee countered on Rob Bironas' 47-yard field goal, which gave the Titans a 13–7 lead going into the fourth quarter. Showing the resolve that allowed them to come from behind in their two previous games, the Indianapolis offense delivered what turned out to be the game-clinching score with only five minutes left in the fourth quarter on a 2-yard touchdown pass from Peyton Manning to WR Reggie Wayne to give the Colts a 14–13 lead. That ended up being the final score after Vince Young could not convert on a hail mary pass in the end zone. With the win, the Colts stayed undefeated and expanded their lead in the AFC South to two games over second place Jacksonville.

Peyton Manning finished the game 20 of 31 for 166 passing yards with 2 touchdown passes and one interception, and Vince Young finished with 63 passing yards on 10 of 21 pass attempts and threw one interception also. Tennessee running back Travis Henry had 123 rushing yards in the loss.

==== Week 7: vs. Washington Redskins ====
Week 7: Washington Redskins at Indianapolis Colts – Game summary

Quarter	1	2	3	4	Total
Redskins	0	14	0	8	**22**
**Colts**	7	6	20	3	**36**

at RCA Dome, Indianapolis, Indiana

- Date: October 22
- Game time: 4:15 p.m. EDT
- Game weather: None (played indoors)
- Game attendance: 57,274
- Referee: Scott Green
- TV announcers (Fox): Dick Stockton and Troy Aikman
- Box score

Game information

**First quarter**

- IND – Dallas Clark 1-yard pass from Peyton Manning (Adam Vinatieri kick), 6:59. Colts 7–0. **Drive: 11 plays, 92 yards, 5:56.**

**Second quarter**

- WAS – Chris Cooley 13-yard pass from Mark Brunell (Nick Novak kick), 13:19. Tied 7–7. **Drive: 7 plays, 45 yards, 2:35.**
- IND – Adam Vinatieri 30-yard field goal, 8:41. Colts 10–7. **Drive: 10 plays, 62 yards, 4:38.**
- WAS – Antwaan Randle El 87-yard punt return (Nick Novak kick), 2:24. Redskins 14–10.
- IND – Adam Vinatieri 19-yard field goal, 0:08. Redskins 14–13. **Drive: 10 plays, 52 yards, 2:16.**

**Third quarter**

- IND – Marvin Harrison 4-yard pass from Peyton Manning (Adam Vinatieri kick), 12:59. Colts 20–14. **Drive: 4 plays, 55 yards, 2:01.**
- IND – Reggie Wayne 51-yard pass from Peyton Manning (Adam Vinatieri kick), 8:11. Colts 27–14. **Drive: 4 plays, 81 yards, 2:02.**
- IND – Marvin Harrison 1-yard pass from Peyton Manning (pass failed), 2:46. Colts 33–14. **Drive: 7 plays, 66 yards, 3:11.**

**Fourth quarter**

- IND – Adam Vinatieri 47-yard field goal, 4:41. Colts 36–14. **Drive: 10 plays, 46 yards, 5:30.**
- WAS – James Thrash 5-yard pass from Mark Brunell (Mark Brunell pass to Chris Cooley), 0:18. Colts 36–22. **Drive: 14 plays, 99 yards, 4:23.**

**Top passers**

- WAS – Mark Brunell – 27/37, 226 yards, 2 TD
- IND – Peyton Manning – 25/35, 342 yards, 4 TD

**Top rushers**

- WAS – Ladell Betts – 10 carries, 52 yards
- IND – Joseph Addai – 11 rushes, 85 yards

**Top receivers**

- WAS – Chris Cooley – 4 receptions, 42 yards, TD
- IND – Reggie Wayne – 7 receptions, 122 yards, TD

Coming off their bye week, the Colts gave a solid offensive performance at home against the Washington Redskins. Indianapolis won the contest 36–22 despite being down 14–13 at halftime. QB Peyton Manning, who was hit hard by defenders twice in the first half, rebounded resoundingly in the second half with 3 touchdown passes in the third quarter. On a day when Manning was almost perfect, he and WR Marvin Harrison connected for two touchdowns. The performance also saw the pair move up in their respective career yardage lists; Manning passed Jim Hart to move into 14th place in all-time passing yards and Harrison passed Irving Fryar to move into eighth on the career receiving yardage chart. Washington QB Mark Brunell threw for two touchdowns and no interceptions, but his performance could not prevent the Redskins' third consecutive loss going into their bye week.

Colts quarterback Peyton Manning finished the game 25 of 35 for 342 yards passing and four touchdowns, while Washington quarterback Mark Brunell completed 27 of his 37 pass attempts for 226 yards passing and two touchdowns. Colts rookie RB Joseph Addai had a career-high 85 yards rushing on 11 carries, and Redskins RB Ladell Betts carried the football 10 times for 52 yards. Colts WR Reggie Wayne had his first big game of the season, as he had 7 catches for 122 yards receiving and one touchdown. In 2011, Tony Dungy speculated that the hard hits Peyton Manning suffered in the first half of the game were the start of the neck issues that would ultimately lead to Peyton Manning leaving the Colts in 2012.

==== Week 8: at Denver Broncos ====
Week 8: Indianapolis Colts at Denver Broncos – Game summary

Quarter	1	2	3	4	Total
**Colts**	3	3	14	14	**34**
Broncos	0	14	7	10	**31**

at Invesco Field at Mile High, Denver, Colorado

- Date: October 29
- Game time: 4:15 p.m. EST/2:15 p.m. MST
- Game weather: Partly sunny, 70 °F (21 °C)
- Game attendance: 76,767
- Referee: Terry McAulay
- TV announcers (CBS): Jim Nantz and Phil Simms
- Box score

Game information

**First quarter**

- IND – Adam Vinatieri 42-yard field goal, 1:45. Colts 3–0. **Drive: 14 plays, 67 yards, 8:08.**

**Second quarter**

- DEN – Jake Plummer 1-yard run (Jason Elam kick), 11:16. Broncos 7–3. **Drive: 9 plays, 78 yards, 5:29.**
- IND – Adam Vinatieri 30-yard field goal, 5:10. Broncos 7–6. **Drive: 11 plays, 59 yards, 6:06.**
- DEN – Javon Walker 15-yard pass from Jake Plummer (Jason Elam kick), 0:22. Broncos 14–6. **Drive: 11 plays, 80 yards, 4:48.**

**Third quarter**

- IND – Reggie Wayne 12-yard pass from Peyton Manning (Adam Vinatieri kick), 12:04. Broncos 14–13. **Drive: 6 plays, 56 yards, 1:54.**
- IND – Reggie Wayne 5-yard pass from Peyton Manning (Adam Vinatieri kick), 8:54. Colts 20–14. **Drive: 3 plays, 12 yards, 1:22.**
- DEN – Mike Bell 1-yard run (Jason Elam kick), 0:00. Broncos 21–20. **Drive: 14 plays, 87 yards, 8:54.**

**Fourth quarter**

- IND – Adam Vinatieri 48-yard field goal, 11:37. Colts 23–21. **Drive: 8 plays, 50 yards, 3:23.**
- DEN – Mike Bell 1-yard run (Jason Elam kick), 6:54. Broncos 28–23. **Drive: 8 plays, 81 yards, 4:43.**
- IND – Reggie Wayne 19-yard pass from Peyton Manning (Peyton Manning pass to Reggie Wayne), 3:35. Colts 31–28. **Drive: 7 plays, 80 yards, 3:19.**
- DEN – Jason Elam 49-yard field goal, 1:49. Tied 31–31. **Drive: 5 plays, 49 yards, 1:46.**
- IND – Adam Vinatieri 37-yard field goal, 0:02. Colts 34–31. **Drive: 8 plays, 62 yards, 1:47.**

**Top passers**

- IND – Peyton Manning – 32/39, 345 yards, 3 TD
- DEN – Jake Plummer – 13/21, 174 yards, TD

**Top rushers**

- IND – Joseph Addai – 17 rushes, 93 yards
- DEN – Mike Bell – 15 rushes, 136 yards, 2 TD

**Top receivers**

- IND – Reggie Wayne – 10 receptions, 138 yards, 3 TD
- DEN – Tony Scheffler – 4 receptions, 51 yards

After a convincing win over a struggling Redskins team in Week 7, the Colts faced one of their toughest opponents of the year in the Denver Broncos. The Broncos sat atop the AFC West standings with a 5–1 record thanks in large part to a strong running game and a dominating defense that had only allowed two touchdowns on the season. Both defenses played well in the first quarter, which ended with the Colts leading 3–0. Denver took the lead early in the second quarter on a Jake Plummer one-yard touchdown run. Indianapolis cut the lead to one on their next drive, which ended in a 30-yard Adam Vinatieri field goal, but the Broncos answered with a 15-yard touchdown pass from QB Jake Plummer to WR Javon Walker just before halftime to expand their lead to 14–6. On their first drive of the half Indianapolis came within one point of the lead on a 12-yard touchdown pass from QB Peyton Manning to WR Reggie Wayne. On the Colts' next possession, Wayne and Manning hooked up again for another touchdown, this one a 5-yard TD pass to take the lead 20–14. But the Broncos came back with a one-yard touchdown run by Mike Bell, giving them a one-point lead at the end of the third quarter. After a Vinatieri field goal and another Denver touchdown, the Colts were down by 5 points with a little over half of the fourth quarter remaining. After the Colts received the kickoff, they marched down the field. The drive ended with a 19-yard touchdown pass from Manning to Wayne, the third time they hooked up for a touchdown in the game. The Colts were now up by one point and decided to go for the two-point conversion to go up by a field goal. The conversion was a success as Manning found Reggie Wayne in the end zone again. Jason Elam came through for Denver and made a 49-yard field goal to tie the game at 31. The final drive of the game resulted in an Adam Vinatieri field goal with two seconds left to put Indianapolis up by three.

Manning ended the game with three touchdown passes, all of them to Reggie Wayne. Rookie RB Joseph Addai had a career-high 93 yards rushing on only 17 carries. DE Dwight Freeney was credited with half a sack, his first of the season.

==== Week 9: at New England Patriots ====
Week 9: Indianapolis Colts at New England Patriots – Game summary

Quarter	1	2	3	4	Total
**Colts**	7	10	7	3	**27**
Patriots	0	14	3	3	**20**

at Gillette Stadium, Foxboro, Massachusetts

- Date: November 5
- Game time: 8:15 p.m. EST
- Game weather: Clear, 31 °F (−1 °C)
- Game attendance: 68,756
- Referee: Ron Winter
- TV announcers (NBC): Al Michaels and John Madden
- Box score

Game information

**First quarter**

- IND – Marvin Harrison 5-yard pass from Peyton Manning (Adam Vinatieri kick), 4:30. Colts 7–0. **Drive: 9 plays, 68 yards, 4:43.**

**Second quarter**

- NE – Corey Dillon 1-yard run (Stephen Gostkowski kick), 14:25. Tied 7–7. **Drive: 11 plays, 83 yards, 5:05.**
- IND – Joseph Addai 2-yard run (Adam Vinatieri kick), 9:56. Colts 14–7. **Drive: 8 plays, 82 yards, 4:29.**
- NE – Corey Dillon 4-yard run (Stephen Gostkowski kick), 4:14. Tied 14–14. **Drive: 11 plays, 59 yards, 5:42.**
- IND – Adam Vinatieri 23-yard field goal, 1:46. Colts 17–14. **Drive: 6 plays, 23 yards, 2:28.**

**Third quarter**

- IND – Marvin Harrison 4-yard pass from Peyton Manning (Adam Vinatieri kick), 6:56. Colts 24–14. **Drive: 8 plays, 73 yards, 2:35.**
- NE – Stephen Gostkowski 49-yard field goal, 5:18. Colts 24–17. **Drive: 6 plays, 30 yards, 1:38.**

**Fourth quarter**

- IND – Adam Vinatieri 31-yard field goal, 10:17. Colts 27–17. **Drive: 8 plays, 33 yards, 2:47.**
- NE – Stephen Gostkowski 26-yard field goal, 6:01. Colts 27–20. **Drive: 9 plays, 53 yards, 4:16.**

**Top passers**

- IND – Peyton Manning – 20/36, 326 yards, 2 TD, INT
- NE – Tom Brady – 20/35, 201 yards, 4 INT

**Top rushers**

- IND – Joseph Addai – 18 rushes, 43 yards, TD
- NE – Laurence Maroney – 13 rushes, 63 yards

**Top receivers**

- IND – Marvin Harrison – 8 receptions, 145 yards, 2 TD
- NE – Benjamin Watson – 4 receptions, 54 yards

The Colts headed to Gillette Stadium for a highly anticipated Sunday Night Football matchup with the New England Patriots in Week 9. In the first quarter, an interception in the end zone by Colts rookie FS Antoine Bethea set up the Colts' first scoring drive, a 68-yard march that ended with a 5-yard touchdown pass from QB Peyton Manning to WR Marvin Harrison for the only score of the quarter. Already banged up on defense, the Patriots lost SS Rodney Harrison to a shoulder injury in the first quarter, and he never returned to the game. The second quarter was a lot more eventful after two scores by Patriots RB Corey Dillon, a TD run by Colts rookie RB Joseph Addai, and a field goal by Colts kicker Adam Vinatieri.

The Patriots played from behind for the rest of the game and could not catch up to the Colts. Patriots QB Tom Brady was intercepted four times in the defeat, and Colts LB Cato June intercepted two of those passes. Also of note, Colts WR Marvin Harrison had 8 catches in the game for 145 yards and two touchdowns. The victory marked the Colts' second straight versus the Patriots after having lost the previous six. With the win, the Colts became just the second team in NFL history to begin consecutive seasons 8–0 (the Green Bay Packers began three consecutive seasons 8–0 from 1929 to 1931). Also, with 326 yards passing QB Peyton Manning threw for over 300 yards in three consecutive games for the first time in his career.

==== Week 10: vs. Buffalo Bills ====
Week 10: Buffalo Bills at Indianapolis Colts – Game summary

Quarter	1	2	3	4	Total
Bills	3	7	3	3	**16**
**Colts**	0	10	7	0	**17**

at RCA Dome, Indianapolis, Indiana

- Date: November 12
- Game time: 1:00 p.m. EST
- Game weather: None (played indoors)
- Game attendance: 57,306
- Referee: Tony Corrente
- TV announcers (CBS): Dick Enberg and Randy Cross
- Box score

Game information

**First quarter**

- BUF – Rian Lindell 22-yard field goal, 6:52. Bills 3–0. **Drive: 14 plays, 63 yards, 8:08.**

**Second quarter**

- IND – Reggie Wayne 1-yard pass from Peyton Manning (Adam Vinatieri kick), 11:09. Colts 7–3. **Drive: 9 plays, 58 yards, 5:13.**
- IND – Adam Vinatieri 31-yard field goal, 2:44. Colts 10–3. **Drive: 13 plays, 78 yards, 6:47.**
- BUF – Terrence McGee 68-yard fumble return (Rian Lindell kick), 0:31. Tied 10–10.

**Third quarter**

- IND – Joseph Addai 5-yard run (Adam Vinatieri kick), 10:30. Colts 17–10. **Drive: 9 plays, 74 yards, 4:30.**
- BUF – Rian Lindell 30-yard field goal, 8:47. Colts 17–13. **Drive: 4 plays, 0 yards, 1:43.**

**Fourth quarter**

- BUF – Rian Lindell 43-yard field goal, 10:35. Colts 17–16. **Drive: 9 plays, 36 yards, 4:25.**

**Top passers**

- BUF – J. P. Losman – 8/12, 83 yards
- IND – Peyton Manning – 27/39, 236 yards, TD

**Top rushers**

- BUF – Anthony Thomas – 28 rushes, 109 yards
- IND – Joseph Addai – 13 rushes, 78 yards, TD

**Top receivers**

- BUF – Lee Evans – 5 receptions, 70 yards
- IND – Ben Utecht – 7 receptions, 66 yards

The Colts defeated the Buffalo Bills in Week 10, 17–16, becoming the first team in NFL history to start consecutive seasons 9–0. The game's scoring consisted of four touchdowns and three field goals. Buffalo struck first, as they converted a field goal attempt by K Rian Lindell. The Colts then followed with a score of their own, a 1-yard TD pass from QB Peyton Manning to WR Reggie Wayne to take the lead with 11:14 left in the half. The Colts had a 7-point lead near the end of the half, but Buffalo swung the momentum their way as Terrence McGee returned a fumble 68-yards for a touchdown to tie the game at 10.

On the opening possession of the third quarter, the drive ended in a 5-yard touchdown run by Colts rookie RB Joseph Addai. Terrence McGee then took Adam Vinatieri's kickoff 88 yards to the Colts 12-yard line. Buffalo could not come up with anything on the rest of the drive and had to settle for another field goal. On the opening drive of the fourth quarter, Lindell made another field goal for the Bills to reduce the Colts' lead to 1 point. When the Bills drove down the field on their next possession, they had a chance to take the lead, but Rian Lindell missed his field goal, and the Colts ran out the clock to move to 9–0. With the Colts' win and a loss by the Jacksonville Jaguars, 13–10 to the Houston Texans, the Colts were now four games ahead in the AFC South.

==== Week 11: at Dallas Cowboys ====
Week 11: Indianapolis Colts at Dallas Cowboys – Game summary

Quarter	1	2	3	4	Total
Colts	0	7	7	0	**14**
**Cowboys**	0	0	7	14	**21**

at Texas Stadium, Irving, Texas

- Date: November 19
- Game time: 4:15 p.m. EST/3:15 p.m. CST
- Game weather: Clear, 63 °F (17 °C)
- Game attendance: 63,706
- Referee: Bill Vinovich
- TV announcers (CBS): Jim Nantz and Phil Simms
- Box score

Game information

**First quarter**

- No scoring plays

**Second quarter**

- IND – Reggie Wayne 23-yard pass from Peyton Manning (Adam Vinatieri kick), 0:10. Colts 7–0. **Drive: 14 plays, 88 yards, 2:53.**

**Third quarter**

- DAL – Kevin Burnett 39-yard interception return (Mike Vanderjagt kick), 14:09. Tied 7–7.
- IND – Dallas Clark 4-yard pass from Peyton Manning (Adam Vinatieri kick), 5:09. Colts 14–7. **Drive: 10 plays, 71 yards, 4:28.**

**Fourth quarter**

- DAL – Marion Barber III 5-yard run (Mike Vanderjagt kick), 11:36. Tied 14–14. **Drive: 15 plays, 68 yards, 8:33.**
- DAL – Marion Barber III 1-yard run (Mike Vanderjagt kick), 6:00. Cowboys 21–14. **Drive: 7 plays, 80 yards, 3:51.**

**Top passers**

- IND – Peyton Manning – 20/39, 254 yards, 2 TD, 2 INT
- DAL – Tony Romo – 19/23, 226 yards, INT

**Top rushers**

- IND – Joseph Addai – 13 rushes, 50 yards
- DAL – Julius Jones – 22 rushes, 79 yards

**Top receivers**

- IND – Reggie Wayne – 7 receptions, 111 yards, TD
- DAL – Terry Glenn – 6 receptions, 78 yards

The Colts suffered their first defeat of the season, 21–14, at the hand of the Dallas Cowboys and became the last team to lose during the 2006 NFL season. The game was full of turnovers, and neither team could take care of the scoring opportunities. Colts QB Peyton Manning threw two interceptions and one of those was returned for a touchdown by Cowboys OLB Kevin Burnett early in the second half. The first quarter was back-and-forth as each possession ended with turnover after turnover. After Cowboys QB Tony Romo was sacked by DE Dwight Freeney, Colts WR Marvin Harrison fumbled, and after the Cowboys punted, Manning was sacked by Jay Ratliff and Bradie James recovered the fumble. After a couple of punts by both teams, Peyton Manning & Co. pushed the Cowboys deep in their own territory thanks to the great rushing by rookie RB Joseph Addai. The Colts reached the 4-yard line, and on third down, Manning attempted a pass to the endzone, but in a controversial situation, SS Roy Williams nudged TE Dallas Clark near the end zone, and while Clark fell down, Williams intercepted a Peyton Manning pass for the second time in his career, and gave the Cowboys the ball at their own 7-yard line. The Cowboys scored all of their points in the second half after a first half that was full of turnovers.

Colts QB Peyton Manning went 20 of 39 for 254 passing yards with two touchdown passes and two interceptions, Cowboys QB Tony Romo was 19 of 23 with 226 passing yards and had one interception. Colts WR Reggie Wayne had 7 catches for 111 yards, and Cowboys RB Julius Jones rushed the football 22 times for 79 yards. Also of note, former Colts kicker Mike Vanderjagt missed two of his three field goals during the game.

==== Week 12: vs. Philadelphia Eagles ====
Week 12: Philadelphia Eagles at Indianapolis Colts – Game summary

Quarter	1	2	3	4	Total
Eagles	0	7	7	7	**21**
**Colts**	7	17	7	14	**45**

at RCA Dome, Indianapolis, Indiana

- Date: November 26
- Game time: 8:15 p.m. EST
- Game weather: None (played indoors)
- Game attendance: 57,296
- Referee: Bill Carollo
- TV announcers (NBC): Al Michaels and John Madden
- Box score

Game information

**First quarter**

- IND – Joseph Addai 15-yard run (Adam Vinatieri kick), 10:06. Colts 7–0. **Drive: 9 plays, 79 yards, 4:54.**

**Second quarter**

- IND – Joseph Addai 10-yard run (Adam Vinatieri kick), 14:55. Colts 14–0. **Drive: 5 plays, 74 yards, 1:53.**
- IND – Joseph Addai 15-yard run (Adam Vinatieri kick), 8:58. Colts 21–0. **Drive: 9 plays, 60 yards, 5:38.**
- PHI – L. J. Smith 1-yard pass from Jeff Garcia (David Akers kick), 1:19. Colts 21–7. **Drive: 10 plays, 88 yards, 5:28.**
- IND – Adam Vinatieri 44-yard field goal, 0:00. Colts 24–7. **Drive: 7 plays, 33 yards, 1:19.**

**Third quarter**

- IND – Reggie Wayne 11-yard pass from Peyton Manning (Adam Vinatieri kick), 6:39. Colts 31–7. **Drive: 9 plays, 89 yards, 5:47.**
- PHI – Reggie Brown 3-yard pass from Jeff Garcia (David Akers kick), 0:43. Colts 31–14. **Drive: 11 plays, 75 yards, 5:56.**

**Fourth quarter**

- PHI – Brian Westbrook 6-yard run (David Akers kick), 10:13. Colts 31–21. **Drive: 3 plays, 27 yards, 1:16.**
- IND – Joseph Addai 4-yard run (Adam Vinatieri kick), 3:38. Colts 38–21. **Drive: 13 plays, 70 yards, 6:35.**
- IND – Kelvin Hayden 26-yard fumble return (Adam Vinatieri kick), 3:25. Colts 45–21.

**Top passers**

- PHI – Jeff Garcia – 19/23, 140 yards, 2 TD
- IND – Peyton Manning – 14/20, 183 yards, TD, INT

**Top rushers**

- PHI – Brian Westbrook – 20 rushes, 124 yards, TD
- IND – Joseph Addai – 24 rushes, 171 yards, 4 TD

**Top receivers**

- PHI – Brian Westbrook – 7 receptions, 46 yards
- IND – Reggie Wayne – 4 receptions, 77 yards, TD

This Week 12 showdown between the Colts and Eagles was originally scheduled for 1:00 ET, but due to the NFL's "flexible-scheduling" system this year, the NFL moved the game to Sunday night at 8:15 ET. This was the Colts' third primetime game this year on NBC, and the Eagles' first. There were 10 scores in this game, 5 each half. The first three scores of the game were by Colts rookie RB Joseph Addai. He had a 15-yard TD run, a 10-yard TD run, and another 15-yard TD run after that. His fourth rushing touchdown of the game came in the second half. The Eagles' first score came with about a minute to go in the half. Quarterback Jeff Garcia threw a 1-yard touchdown pass to L.J. Smith on that drive. On the Colts' next drive, combined with a couple of passes and a 13-yard run by Dominic Rhodes, the Colts put K Adam Vinatieri in field goal range to get some more points before the end of the half. At the half, the Colts had a 17-point lead, 24–7. After a Reggie Wayne touchdown catch, the Colts were up big on the Eagles, 31–7.

On the ensuing possession for the Eagles, Garcia found Reggie Brown in the end zone for a 3-yard score. But with less than 11 minutes left in the game, the Eagles scored once more and reduced the Colts' lead to 10 points. On the following possession, the Colts ran the ball 13 times with no passes and Joseph Addai had the last 8 carries on that drive including another 4-yard scamper, his fourth touchdown of the game. That touchdown also tied the Colts franchise record for the most rushing touchdowns in a single game.

With less than four minutes to go in the game, the Eagles were desperate to score some points, but while Jeff Garcia was deep in his own territory, he dropped back to pass and was hit by both DE Robert Mathis and DE Dwight Freeney. Mathis knocked the ball out of Garcia's hand right before his arm started going forwards and CB Kelvin Hayden picked up the ball and ran it back for a touchdown. The Colts were up by 24 points after that last score. On the next possession, the Eagles put in backup QB A. J. Feeley in place of Garcia, and Feeley ended up getting the football knocked out of his hand by Robert Mathis (his second forced fumble of the game) and the Colts recovered and ended up running out the clock to conclude the game.

Joseph Addai tied the NFL record for most touchdowns in a game by a rookie, with 4 touchdowns in this game. During this game, the Colts lost SS Antoine Bethea, TE Dallas Clark and OT Ryan Diem all to injuries in the first half, and they did not return.

==== Week 13: at Tennessee Titans ====
Week 13: Indianapolis Colts at Tennessee Titans – Game summary

Quarter	1	2	3	4	Total
Colts	7	7	0	3	**17**
**Titans**	0	10	0	10	**20**

at LP Field, Nashville, Tennessee

- Date: December 3
- Game time: 1:00 p.m. EST/12:00 p.m. CST
- Game weather: Partly sunny, 40 °F (4 °C)
- Game attendance: 69,143
- Referee: Bill Leavy
- TV announcers (CBS): Greg Gumbel and Dan Dierdorf
- Box score

Game information

**First quarter**

- IND – Marvin Harrison 68-yard pass from Peyton Manning (Adam Vinatieri kick), 3:51. Colts 7–0. **Drive: 5 plays, 80 yards, 1:25.**

**Second quarter**

- IND – Dominic Rhodes 2-yard run (Adam Vinatieri kick), 7:18. Colts 14–0. **Drive: 14 plays, 81 yards, 8:05.**
- TEN – Rob Bironas 25-yard field goal, 1:49. Colts 14–3. **Drive: 12 plays, 70 yards, 5:29.**
- TEN – Drew Bennett 20-yard pass from Vince Young (Rob Bironas kick), 0:11. Colts 14–10. **Drive: 3 plays, 42 yards, 0:20.**

**Third quarter**

- No scoring plays

**Fourth quarter**

- TEN – Brandon Jones 9-yard pass from Vince Young (Rob Bironas kick), 12:24. Titans 17–14. **Drive: 11 plays, 65 yards, 6:50.**
- IND – Adam Vinatieri 20-yard field goal, 2:38. Tied 17–17. **Drive: 9 plays, 83 yards, 4:41.**
- TEN – Rob Bironas 60-yard field goal, 0:07. Titans 20–17. **Drive: 9 plays, 33 yards, 2:31.**

**Top passers**

- IND – Peyton Manning – 21/28, 351 yards, TD, 2 INT
- TEN – Vince Young – 15/25, 163 yards, 2 TD, 2 INT

**Top rushers**

- IND – Joseph Addai – 16 rushes, 56 yards
- TEN – Travis Henry – 20 rushes, 93 yards

**Top receivers**

- IND – Marvin Harrison – 7 receptions, 172 yards, TD
- TEN – Bo Scaife – 2 receptions, 31 yards

This game at the Tennessee Titans saw the return of two crucial players for the Colts: WR Brandon Stokley and FS Bob Sanders. The Colts started hot in this game, and the only score of the first quarter came off a 68-yard touchdown pass from QB Peyton Manning to WR Marvin Harrison. The next score for the Colts came in the second quarter, as RB Dominic Rhodes had a 2-yard run for a touchdown. With less than seven minutes to go in the half, the Colts were up 14–0 on Tennessee. But, within a few minutes Titans K Rob Bironas made a 25-yard field goal to cut the lead to 11 points. The Colts' next possession uncharacteristically ended abruptly when Peyton Manning's pass intended for TE Bryan Fletcher was intercepted by OLB Keith Bulluck with 31 seconds left in the half. 20 seconds later, Titans QB Vince Young connected with WR Drew Bennett for a 20-yard touchdown pass to shrink the Colts' lead to 4 points. With 11 seconds left, the Titans' kickoff went out of bounds and the Colts had the ball at their own 40-yard line. On the following play, Manning hooked up with Bryan Fletcher for a 25-yard pass to the 35-yard line. The Colts brought out K Adam Vinatieri to attempt a 53-yard field goal, but the kick stayed right and just missed the upright. At the half, the Colts were in the lead, 14–10.

The third quarter did not yield a score, but Vince Young ran wild. The Colts' rushing defense was at its worst towards the end of the regular season. Three minutes into the last quarter, Vince Young hooked up with WR Brandon Jones for a touchdown to give Tennessee its first lead of the game. Ten minutes later, the Colts tied the game with a Vinatieri field goal from 20 yards out. On what ended up being the last possession of the game, the Titans were trying to defeat the Colts for the first time since the 2002 NFL season. After two first downs, the Titans had the ball at the Colts' 41-yard line with 31 seconds to go. After a short pass for 4 yards and an incomplete pass, the Titans had one last shot at a field goal to win the game. Kicker Rob Bironas had very high winds at his back and he made the 60-yard field goal with a lot of help from wind. He cleared the crossbar by almost 3 yards, and made the game-winning field goal for the Titans for the second straight week. With the brutal loss, the Colts went to 10–2 on the season.

==== Week 14: at Jacksonville Jaguars ====
Week 14: Indianapolis Colts at Jacksonville Jaguars – Game summary

Quarter	1	2	3	4	Total
Colts	3	7	0	7	**17**
**Jaguars**	7	17	13	7	**44**

at Alltel Stadium, Jacksonville, Florida

- Date: December 10
- Game time: 1:00 p.m. EST
- Game weather: Sunny, 65 °F (18 °C)
- Game attendance: 67,164
- Referee: Jerome Boger
- TV announcers (CBS): Kevin Harlan and Rich Gannon
- Box score

Game information

**First quarter**

- JAX – Maurice Jones-Drew 18-yard run (Josh Scobee kick), 12:19. Jaguars 7–0. **Drive: 2 plays, 94 yards, 1:00.**
- IND – Adam Vinatieri 41-yard field goal, 6:05. Jaguars 7–3. **Drive: 7 plays, 39 yards, 3:23.**

**Second quarter**

- IND – Dominic Rhodes 1-yard run (Adam Vinatieri kick), 8:18. Colts 10–7. **Drive: 12 plays, 80 yards, 5:54.**
- JAX – Fred Taylor 21-yard run (Josh Scobee kick), 5:45. Jaguars 14–10. **Drive: 5 plays, 81 yards, 2:33.**
- JAX – Maurice Jones-Drew 48-yard run (Josh Scobee kick), 1:17. Jaguars 21–10. **Drive: 5 plays, 73 yards, 1:32.**
- JAX – Josh Scobee 48-yard field goal, 0:00. Jaguars 24–10. **Drive: 4 plays, 5 yards, 0:25.**

**Third quarter**

- JAX – Maurice Jones-Drew 93-yard kickoff return (Josh Scobee kick), 14:48. Jaguars 31–10.
- JAX – Josh Scobee 34-yard field goal, 11:07. Jaguars 34–10. **Drive: 5 plays, 31 yards, 2:50.**
- JAX – Josh Scobee 46-yard field goal, 0:22. Jaguars 37–10. **Drive: 8 plays, 35 yards, 4:54.**

**Fourth quarter**

- IND – Peyton Manning 1-yard run (Adam Vinatieri kick), 11:13. Jaguars 37–17. **Drive: 12 plays, 80 yards, 4:09.**
- JAX – Alvin Pearman 6-yard run (Josh Scobee kick), 3:59. Jaguars 44–17. **Drive: 11 plays, 70 yards, 7:14.**

**Top passers**

- IND – Peyton Manning – 25/50, 313 yards, INT
- JAX – David Garrard – 8/14, 79 yards, INT

**Top rushers**

- IND – Joseph Addai – 11 rushes, 22 yards
- JAX – Maurice Jones-Drew – 15 rushes, 166 yards, 2 TD

**Top receivers**

- IND – Reggie Wayne – 8 receptions, 110 yards
- JAX – Marcedes Lewis – 1 reception, 19 yards

The Colts came into this game three games ahead of the Jaguars in the AFC South standings, and with a win in this game, the Colts can clinch a playoff spot and the AFC South Championship for the fourth straight year.

On the Jaguars' first play from scrimmage, RB Fred Taylor ran up the middle for 76 yards down to the Colts' 18-yard line. On the following play rookie RB Maurice Jones-Drew rushed 18 yards for the first score of the game. The Colts led the Jaguars at one point in the game, 10–7, but after Jacksonville scored six times before the Colts scored again, there was no way to catch up.

The Colts allowed 375 rushing yards in this game, the second-highest total since the NFL-AFL merger in 1970. Jacksonville RB Maurice Jones-Drew ran for 166 yards and RB Fred Taylor ran for 131 yards. Third-string RB Alvin Pearman also ran for 71 yards. To further emphasize how effective the Jacksonville running game was, Jaguars QB David Garrard was only 8 for 14 with 79 yards passing. While he only threw the ball 14 times, Colts QB Peyton Manning threw the ball 50 times, completing 25 of those passes for 313 passing yards. Neither quarterback threw a touchdown pass, but both of them threw one interception each. The Colts WR tandem of Marvin Harrison and Reggie Wayne did well in this game. Harrison had 8 catches for 110 yards receiving, and Wayne had 6 catches for 101 yards. Jaguars RB Maurice Jones-Drew did not just succeed on offense—he ran back an Adam Vinatieri kickoff 93 yards for a touchdown also.

The Colts lost SS Antoine Bethea to a shoulder injury, and he would not return. As a consequence, the Colts fell to 10–3, losing first place in the AFC, while the Jaguars improved to 8–5, with the embarrassing loss.

==== Week 15: vs. Cincinnati Bengals ====
Week 15: Cincinnati Bengals at Indianapolis Colts – Game summary

Quarter	1	2	3	4	Total
Bengals	3	7	3	3	**16**
**Colts**	3	14	14	3	**34**

at RCA Dome, Indianapolis, Indiana

- Date: December 18
- Game time: 8:30 p.m. EST
- Game weather: None (played indoors)
- Game attendance: 57,292
- Referee: Gene Steratore
- TV announcers (ESPN): Mike Tirico, Joe Theismann and Tony Kornheiser
- Box score

Game information

**First quarter**

- IND – Adam Vinatieri 30-yard field goal, 8:00. Colts 3–0. **Drive: 9 plays, 34 yards, 4:44.**
- CIN – Shayne Graham 27-yard field goal, 1:05. Tied 3–3. **Drive: 13 plays, 66 yards, 6:55.**

**Second quarter**

- IND – Marvin Harrison 4-yard pass from Peyton Manning (Adam Vinatieri kick), 10:25. Colts 10–3. **Drive: 11 plays, 70 yards, 5:40.**
- CIN – Rudi Johnson 12-yard run (Shayne Graham kick), 6:49. Tied 10–10. **Drive: 5 plays, 25 yards, 2:07.**
- IND – Marvin Harrison 3-yard pass form Peyton Manning (Adam Vinatieri kick), 0:13. Colts 17–10. **Drive: 13 plays, 61 yards, 6:36.**

**Third quarter**

- CIN – Shayne Graham 30-yard field goal, 9:14. Colts 17–13. **Drive: 6 plays, 43 yards, 2:51.**
- IND – Marvin Harrison 1-yard pass from Peyton Manning (Adam Vinatieri kick), 6:36. Colts 24–13. **Drive: 6 plays, 75 yards, 2:38.**
- IND – Reggie Wayne 18-yard pass from Peyton Manning (Adam Vinatieri kick), 2:16. Colts 31–13. **Drive: 6 plays, 57 yards, 3:18.**

**Fourth quarter**

- CIN – Shayne Graham 28-yard field goal, 13:07. Colts 31–16. **Drive: 9 plays, 69 yards, 4:09.**
- IND – Adam Vinatieri 44-yard field goal, 5:25. Colts 34–16. **Drive: 11 plays, 62 yards, 5:49.**

**Top passers**

- CIN – Carson Palmer – 14/28, 176 yards
- IND – Peyton Manning – 29/36, 282 yards, 4 TD

**Top rushers**

- CIN – Rudi Johnson – 22 rushes, 79 yards, TD
- IND – Dominic Rhodes – 19 rushes, 52 yards

**Top receivers**

- CIN – Kenny Watson – 3 receptions, 56 yards
- IND – Marvin Harrison – 8 receptions, 86 yards, 3 TD

Hoping to rebound from their blowout road loss to the Jaguars, the Colts went home for a Monday Night Football matchup with the Cincinnati Bengals. In the first quarter, Indianapolis struck first with K Adam Vinatieri nailing a 30-yard field goal. The Bengals would respond with K Shayne Graham converting a 27-yard field goal. In the second quarter, the Colts began their breakout with QB Peyton Manning completing a 4-yard touchdown pass to WR Marvin Harrison. Harrison would end up catching three touchdown passes in this game. Even though Cincinnati responded with 12-yard touchdown run by RB Rudi Johnson, Indianapolis responded with Manning completing a 3-yard touchdown pass to Harrison. In the third quarter, the Bengals converted another field goal, and the Colts continued their power with Manning completing another touchdown pass to Marvin Harrison. Afterwards, Manning would complete another touchdown pass, this one an 18-yarder to WR Reggie Wayne. In the fourth quarter, the Bengals' only response was another field goal. After that last field goal by Shayne Graham, Adam Vinatieri responded with a 44-yard field goal to close out the game. With the win, the Colts improved to 11–3.

Colts QB Peyton Manning finished the game 29 of 36 for 282 yards with four touchdowns and no interceptions, while Bengals QB Carson Palmer was 14 of 28 for 176 passing yards. Palmer also fumbled the football four times in this game. Colts DE Dwight Freeney forced three fumbles in the game and also had three sacks on Carson Palmer.

==== Week 16: at Houston Texans ====
Week 16: Indianapolis Colts at Houston Texans – Game summary

Quarter	1	2	3	4	Total
Colts	7	7	3	7	**24**
**Texans**	14	7	0	6	**27**

at Reliant Stadium, Houston, Texas

- Date: December 24
- Game time: 1:00 p.m. EST/12:00 p.m. CST
- Game weather: None (retractable roof closed)
- Game attendance: 70,132
- Referee: Ed Hochuli
- TV announcers (CBS): Ian Eagle and Solomon Wilcots
- Box score

Game information

**First quarter**

- HOU – Ron Dayne 3-yard run (Kris Brown kick), 10:23. Texans 7–0. **Drive: 10 plays, 62 yards, 4:37.**
- HOU – Ron Dayne 6-yard run (Kris Brown kick), 5:46. Texans 14–0. **Drive: 9 plays, 47 yards, 4:11.**
- IND – Marvin Harrison 37-yard pass from Peyton Manning (Adam Vinatieri kick), 0:58. Texans 14–7. **Drive: 10 plays, 80 yards, 4:48.**

**Second quarter**

- IND – Aaron Moorehead 9-yard pass from Peyton Manning (Adam Vinatieri kick), 8:16. Tied 14–14. **Drive: 10 plays, 80 yards, 5:41.**
- HOU – Vonta Leach 3-yard pass from David Carr (Kris Brown kick), 0:16. Texans 21–14. **Drive: 14 plays, 75 yards, 8:00.**

**Third quarter**

- IND – Adam Vinatieri 33-yard field goal, 1:23. Texans 21–17. **Drive: 11 plays, 65 yards, 6:08.**

**Fourth quarter**

- HOU – Kris Brown 42-yard field goal, 6:54. Texans 24–17. **Drive: 15 plays, 51 yards, 9:29.**
- IND – Marvin Harrison 7-yard pass from Peyton Manning (Adam Vinatieri kick), 2:41. Tied 24–24. **Drive: 8 plays, 71 yards, 4:13.**
- HOU – Kris Brown 48-yard field goal, 0:00. Texans 27–24. **Drive: 6 plays, 31 yards, 2:41.**

**Top passers**

- IND – Peyton Manning – 21/27, 205 yards, 3 TD
- HOU – David Carr – 16/23, 163 yards, TD

**Top rushers**

- IND – Joseph Addai – 15 rushes, 100 yards
- HOU – Ron Dayne – 32 rushes, 153 yards, 2 TD

**Top receivers**

- IND – Marvin Harrison – 8 receptions, 112 yards, 2 TD
- HOU – Andre Johnson – 4 receptions, 48 yards

Coming off a primetime victory over Cincinnati, the Colts flew to Reliant Stadium for an AFC South rematch with the Houston Texans. Heading into this game, Indianapolis had never lost a game to the Texans, winning their first 9 games against them.

In the first quarter, the Colts got an early shock as RB Ron Dayne ran for a 3-yard touchdown and a 6-yard touchdown run. Indianapolis would respond with 37-yard touchdown pass from QB Peyton Manning to WR Marvin Harrison. In the second quarter, the Colts tied the game with Manning completing a 9-yard touchdown pass to WR Aaron Moorehead. However, Houston reclaimed its lead with QB David Carr's 3-yard touchdown pass to RB Vonta Leach. In the third quarter, Indianapolis crept closer with K Adam Vinatieri making a 33-yard field goal for the only score of the period.

In the fourth quarter, the Texans responded with kicker Kris Brown's 42-yard field goal. Afterwards, the Colts tied the game with Manning hooking up with Harrison again on a 7-yard touchdown pass, Harrison's second of the game. However, Houston managed to pull off a huge upset with Kris Brown's game-winning 48-yard field goal as time expired, giving Indianapolis their first ever loss against them. With the loss, the Colts fell to 11–4. Colts QB Peyton Manning finished the game 21 of 27 for 205 yards passing with three touchdowns and Texans QB David Carr finished with 163 passing yards on completing 16 of 23 passes with one touchdown. Rookie RB Joseph Addai ran the ball 15 times for 100 yards and former Heisman Trophy winner Ron Dayne finished the game with 153 rushing yards on 32 carries.

After this game, the Colts were now 11–4, having lost 4 of 6 after a 9–0 start and dropped to 4–4 on the road.

==== Week 17: vs. Miami Dolphins ====
Week 17: Miami Dolphins at Indianapolis Colts – Game summary

Quarter	1	2	3	4	Total
Dolphins	3	3	6	10	**22**
**Colts**	0	17	3	7	**27**

at RCA Dome, Indianapolis, Indiana

- Date: December 31
- Game time: 4:15 p.m. EST
- Game weather: None (played indoors)
- Game attendance: 57,310
- Referee: Walt Coleman
- TV announcers (CBS): Jim Nantz and Phil Simms
- Box score

Game information

**First quarter**

- MIA – Olindo Mare 28-yard field goal, 7:49. Dolphins 3–0. **Drive: 13 plays, 53 yards, 6:47.**

**Second quarter**

- IND – Dan Klecko 2-yard pass from Peyton Manning (Adam Vinatieri kick), 12:40. Colts 7–3. **Drive: 18 plays, 80 yards, 10:09.**
- MIA – Olindo Mare 38-yard field goal, 1:31. Colts 7–6. **Drive: 11 plays, 68 yards, 5:45.**
- IND – Peyton Manning 11-yard run (Adam Vinatieri kick), 0:19. Colts 14–6. **Drive: 7 plays, 80 yards, 1:12.**
- IND – Adam Vinatieri 46-yard field goal, 0:00. Colts 17–6. **Drive: 2 plays, 9 yards, 0:06.**

**Third quarter**

- MIA – Olindo Mare 42-yard field goal, 13:17. Colts 17–9. **Drive: 5 plays, 51 yards, 1:43.**
- IND – Adam Vinatieri 34-yard field goal, 7:37. Colts 20–9. **Drive: 13 plays, 64 yards, 5:40.**
- MIA – Olindo Mare 27-yard field goal, 2:11. Colts 20–12. **Drive: 9 plays, 56 yards, 5:26.**

**Fourth quarter**

- MIA – Olindo Mare 34-yard field goal, 12:38. Colts 20–15. **Drive: 9 plays, 28 yards, 3:10.**
- IND – Marvin Harrison 27-yard pass from Peyton Manning (Adam Vinatieri kick), 10:07. Colts 27–15. **Drive: 5 plays, 74 yards, 2:31.**
- MIA – Randy McMichael 6-yard pass from Cleo Lemon (Olindo Mare kick), 3:11. Colts 27–22. **Drive: 4 plays, 39 yards, 1:20.**

**Top passers**

- MIA – Cleo Lemon – 18/36, 210 yards, TD, INT
- IND – Peyton Manning – 22/37, 282 yards, 2 TD

**Top rushers**

- MIA – Ronnie Brown – 21 rushes, 115 yards
- IND – Joseph Addai – 21 rushes, 64 yards

**Top receivers**

- MIA – Randy McMichael – 4 receptions, 55 yards, TD
- IND – Marvin Harrison – 5 receptions, 74 yards, TD

Following their first-ever loss to the Texans, the Colts wrapped up the regular season at home against the Miami Dolphins. So far, the Colts were 7–0 at the RCA Dome during the regular season. In the first quarter, the Dolphins scored first with K Olindo Mare's 28-yard field goal for the only score of the quarter. In the second quarter, Indianapolis took the lead with QB Peyton Manning completing a 2-yard touchdown pass to DT Dan Klecko. The Dolphins would follow Indianapolis' touchdown with a 38-yard Olindo Mare field goal. The Colts struck right back with Peyton Manning's 11-yard scamper into the end zone. After Dolphins QB Cleo Lemon was intercepted on his first pass of the possession by LB Cato June, Indianapolis had the ball on the Dolphins' 37-yard line. Kicker Adam Vinatieri would come out and convert a 46-yard field goal to close out the half.

In the third quarter, the Dolphins managed to get another field goal from Mare, and Indianapolis answered back with Adam Vinatieri making a 34-yard field goal. Mare would kick yet another field goal for Miami to reduce the Indianapolis lead to 8 points, but to keep up with the Colts, they needed to score a touchdown. In the fourth quarter, the Dolphins sent out Mare to kick another field goal, his fifth of the game, yet the Colts managed to score another touchdown with Peyton Manning completing a 27-yard touchdown pass to WR Marvin Harrison.

With less than ten minutes remaining in the last game of the season for Miami, they finally found the end zone when Cleo Lemon completed a 6-yard touchdown pass to TE Randy McMichael. The Colts ran out the clock and closed the season with a win at home, to improve their record to 8–0 in the RCA Dome. With the win, Indianapolis wrapped up the regular season at 12–4 and the AFC's No. 3 seed.

=== Standings ===
AFC South
	W	L	T	PCT	DIV	CONF	PF	PA	STK
^{(3)} Indianapolis Colts	12	4	0	.750	3–3	9–3	427	360	W1
Tennessee Titans	8	8	0	.500	4–2	5–7	324	400	L1
Jacksonville Jaguars	8	8	0	.500	2–4	5–7	371	274	L3
Houston Texans	6	10	0	.375	3–3	6–6	267	366	W2

== Postseason ==
Round	Date	Opponent (seed)	Result	Record	Venue	Recap
Wild Card	January 6	Kansas City Chiefs (6)	W 23–8	1–0	RCA Dome	Recap
Divisional	January 13	at Baltimore Ravens (2)	W 15–6	2–0	M&T Bank Stadium	Recap
AFC Championship	January 21	New England Patriots (4)	W 38–34	3–0	RCA Dome	Recap
Super Bowl XLI	February 4	vs. Chicago Bears (N1)	W 29–17	4–0	Dolphin Stadium	Recap

=== Game summaries ===
==== AFC Wild Card: vs. (6) Kansas City Chiefs ====
AFC Wild Card Playoffs: (6) Kansas City Chiefs at (3) Indianapolis Colts – Game summary

Quarter	1	2	3	4	Total
Chiefs	0	0	8	0	8
Colts	6	3	7	7	23

at RCA Dome, Indianapolis, Indiana

- Date: January 6, 2007
- Game time: 4:30 p.m. EST
- Game weather: None (played indoors)
- Game attendance: 57,215
- Referee: Jeff Triplette
- TV announcers (NBC): Tom Hammond and Cris Collinsworth
- Box score

Game information

First quarter

- IND – Adam Vinatieri 48-yard field goal, 8:41. Colts 3–0. Drive: 10 plays, 39 yards, 4:51.
- IND – Adam Vinatieri 19-yard field goal, 2:09. Colts 6–0. Drive: 10 plays, 68 yards, 4:57.

Second quarter

- IND – Adam Vinatieri 50-yard field goal, 0:00. Colts 9–0. Drive: 6 plays, 33 yards, 0:50.

Third quarter

- IND – Joseph Addai 6-yard run (Adam Vinatieri kick), 4:14. Colts 16–0. Drive: 12 plays, 89 yards, 6:56.
- KC – Tony Gonzalez 6-yard pass from Trent Green (Kris Wilson pass from Trent Green), 0:08. Colts 16–8. Drive: 8 plays, 60 yards, 4:06.

Fourth quarter

- IND – Reggie Wayne 5-yard pass from Peyton Manning (Adam Vinatieri kick), 10:16. Colts 23–8. Drive: 9 plays, 71 yards, 4:52.

Top passers

- KC – Trent Green – 14/24, 107 yards, TD, 2 INT
- IND – Peyton Manning – 30/38, 268 yards, TD, 3 INT

Top rushers

- KC – Larry Johnson – 13 rushes, 32 yards
- IND – Joseph Addai – 25 rushes, 122 yards, TD

Top rushers

- KC – Larry Johnson – 5 receptions, 29 yards
- IND – Dallas Clark – 9 receptions, 103 yards

Entering the NFL Playoffs as the AFC's third seed, the Colts began their playoff run against the sixth-seeded Kansas City Chiefs at home, where they finished 8–0 during the regular season. In the first half, the Colts defense started off playing exceptionally well, holding the Chiefs offense without a first down the entire half. On offense, K Adam Vinatieri had all 9 of the Colts' first half points converting field goals of 48-yards, 19-yards, and 50-yards out. In the third quarter, Indianapolis continued where they left off in the first half with rookie running back Joseph Addai running into the end zone for a touchdown from 6 yards out. Kansas City's only scoring drive of the game came with less than 30 seconds remaining in the third quarter. The drive concluded with QB Trent Green completing a 6-yard touchdown pass to TE Tony Gonzalez, along with a successful two-point conversion pass to FB Kris Wilson. In the fourth quarter, with 10:16 remaining, the Colts scored another touchdown, this one a 5-yard pass from QB Peyton Manning to WR Reggie Wayne.

The Colts' rush defense held Chiefs RB Larry Johnson to just 32 yards on 13 carries and 29 receiving yards on 5 receptions. The Colts also outgained the Chiefs in total yards 435 to 126 and in first downs 28 to 7. Both teams committed three turnovers, Peyton Manning threw a season-high three interceptions, two of them picked up by former Patriot Ty Law. Manning finished the game 30 of 38 for 268 passing yards with 1 touchdown. Trent Green completed 14 of his 24 passes for 107 total passing yards with one touchdown also. RB Joseph Addai had 25 carries for 122 rushing yards with 1 touchdown. The Colts defense also forced two fumbles by Trent Green and also sacked him four times.

With the win, the Colts advanced to the AFC Divisional Round to face the second-seeded Baltimore Ravens at M&T Bank Stadium in Baltimore.

==== AFC Divisional Playoffs: at (2) Baltimore Ravens ====
AFC Divisional Playoffs: (3) Indianapolis Colts at (2) Baltimore Ravens – Game summary

Quarter	1	2	3	4	Total
Colts	6	3	3	3	15
Ravens	0	3	0	3	6

at M&T Bank Stadium, Baltimore, Maryland

- Date: January 13, 2007
- Game time: 4:30 p.m. EST
- Game weather: Cloudy, 63 °F (17 °C)
- Game attendance: 71,162
- Referee: Bill Leavy
- TV announcers (CBS): Greg Gumbel and Dan Dierdorf
- Box score

Game information

First quarter

- IND – Adam Vinatieri 23-yard field goal, 8:04. Colts 3–0. Drive: 11 plays, 49 yards, 4:43.
- IND – Adam Vinatieri 42-yard field goal, 5:36. Colts 6–0. Drive: 4 plays, 8 yards, 1:38.

Second quarter

- BAL – Matt Stover 40-yard field goal, 14:56. Colts 6–3. Drive: 5 plays, 19 yards, 2:15.
- IND – Adam Vinatieri 51-yard field goal, 3:15. Colts 9–3. Drive: 13 plays, 66 yards, 6:00.

Third quarter

- IND – Adam Vinatieri 48-yard field goal, 10:57. Colts 12–3. Drive: 9 plays, 54 yards, 4:03.

Fourth quarter

- BAL – Matt Stover 51-yard field goal, 13:03. Colts 12–6. Drive: 11 plays, 61 yards, 7:40.
- IND – Adam Vinatieri 35-yard field goal, 0:23. Colts 15–6. Drive: 13 plays, 41 yards, 7:16.

Top passers

- IND – Peyton Manning – 15/30, 170 yards, 2 INT
- BAL – Steve McNair – 18/29, 173 yards, 2 INT

Top rushers

- IND – Dominic Rhodes – 14 rushes, 56 yards
- BAL – Jamal Lewis – 13 rushes, 53 yards

Top receivers

- IND – Reggie Wayne – 5 receptions, 51 yards
- BAL – Mark Clayton – 6 receptions, 73 yards

Making their first playoff appearance in Baltimore since relocating to Indianapolis 23 years earlier and coming off their win over the Kansas City Chiefs, the Colts traveled to M&T Bank Stadium for the Divisional Round playoff game against the second-seeded Baltimore Ravens and their top-ranked defense. In the first quarter, Indianapolis scored first with K Adam Vinatieri making a 23-yard field goal. While the next drive failed to produce a touchdown, it produced another field goal, this second one from 42 yards out. In the second quarter, the Ravens responded with K Matt Stover converting a 40-yard field goal to reduce the Colts' lead to 3 points. Afterwards, Vinatieri would boot a career-long 51-yard field goal with 6:00 left in the half to give the Colts a 9–3 lead. In the third quarter, the Colts struggled to find the end zone, yet it provided Adam Vinatieri to cement his immense value to the team as a free agent pickup. He made his fourth field goal from 48 yards out; in the process making NFL history with that kick: Vinatieri surpassed Gary Anderson's mark of 32 career field goals made in the postseason. After Vinatieri's last of his five field goals that he made this game, he had made 34 field goals in his postseason career. With the win, the Colts improved their overall record to 14–4 this season and would advance to the AFC Championship Game to play against the New England Patriots at the RCA Dome in Indianapolis.

Colts QB Peyton Manning finished the game 15 of 30 with 170 passing yards and two interceptions, while Ravens QB Steve McNair completed 18 of his 29 passes for 173 total passing yards and also had two interceptions. The Colts' 32nd-ranked rushing defense allowed only 83 total rushing yards this game, and proved that their defense had dramatically improved from the regular season.

==== AFC Championship: vs. (4) New England Patriots ====
AFC Championship Game: (4) New England Patriots at (3) Indianapolis Colts – Game summary

Quarter	1	2	3	4	Total
Patriots	7	14	7	6	34
Colts	3	3	15	17	38

at RCA Dome, Indianapolis, Indiana

- Date: January 21, 2007
- Game time: 6:30 p.m. EST
- Game weather: None (played indoors)
- Game attendance: 57,433
- Referee: Bill Carollo
- TV announcers (CBS): Jim Nantz and Phil Simms
- Box score

Game information

First quarter

- NE – Logan Mankins 0-yard fumble return (Stephen Gostkowski kick), 7:24. Patriots 7–0.
- IND – Adam Vinatieri 42-yard field goal, 0:48. Patriots 7–3. Drive: 14 plays, 56 yards, 6:36.

Second quarter

- NE – Corey Dillon 7-yard run (Stephen Gostkowski kick), 10:18. Patriots 14–3. Drive: 11 plays, 72 yards, 5:30.
- NE – Asante Samuel 39-yard interception return (Stephen Gostkowski kick), 9:25. Patriots 21–3.
- IND – Adam Vinatieri 26-yard field goal, 0:07. Patriots 21–6. Drive: 15 plays, 79 yards, 2:59.

Third quarter

- IND – Peyton Manning 1-yard run (Adam Vinatieri kick), 8:13. Patriots 21–13. Drive: 14 plays, 76 yards, 2:50.
- IND – Dan Klecko 1-yard pass from Peyton Manning (Marvin Harrison pass from Peyton Manning), 4:00. Tied 21–21. Drive: 6 plays, 76 yards, 2:50.
- NE – Jabar Gaffney 6-yard pass from Tom Brady (Stephen Gostkowski kick), 1:25. Patriots 28–21. Drive: 5 plays, 21 yards, 2:35.

Fourth quarter

- IND – Jeff Saturday 0-yard fumble return (Adam Vinatieri kick), 13:24. Tied 28–28. Drive: 7 plays, 65 yards, 3:01.
- NE – Stephen Gostkowski 28-yard field goal, 7:42. Patriots 31–28. Drive: 6 plays, 33 yards, 2:44.
- IND – Adam Vinatieri 36-yard field goal, 5:31. Tied 31–31. Drive: 5 plays, 59 yards, 2:11.
- NE – Stephen Gostkowski 43-yard field goal, 3:49. Patriots 34–31. Drive: 5 plays, 29 yards, 1:42.
- IND – Joseph Addai 3-yard run (Adam Vinatieri kick), 1:00. Colts 38–34. Drive: 7 plays, 66 yards, 1:17.

Top passers

- NE – Tom Brady – 21/34, 232 yards, TD, INT
- IND – Peyton Manning – 27/47, 349 yards, TD, INT

Top rushers

- NE – Corey Dillon – 7 rushes, 48 yards, TD
- IND – Dominic Rhodes – 14 rushes, 69 yards

Top receivers

- NE – Benjamin Watson – 5 receptions, 48 yards
- IND – Dallas Clark – 6 receptions, 137 yards

Coming off their Divisional road win over the Baltimore Ravens, the Colts came back to the dome for the AFC Championship Game against the fourth-seeded New England Patriots, who were fresh off of their win over the top-seeded San Diego Chargers.

After a pair of punts, the Patriots scored on their second drive of the game. However, the play did not happen the way they planned it. Patriots QB Tom Brady fumbled the handoff to RB Laurence Maroney, the ball started rolling towards the goal line, went through a few pairs of Colts defenders' hands, and G Logan Mankins fell on it for a touchdown. The touchdown was one of two touchdowns in this game by offensive linemen. Indianapolis spent over six minutes on their next possession that resulted in a 42-yard field goal by kicker Adam Vinatieri. On the Patriots' first possession of the second quarter, they had no trouble moving the ball downfield and eventually scored on a 7-yard touchdown run by RB Corey Dillon, and the Colts were looking to score quickly to get momentum on their side. However, on the second play of the drive, Colts QB Peyton Manning threw a pass that was intercepted by CB Asante Samuel and he ran that back 39 yards for a touchdown to put the Colts down 21–3 with a little over nine minutes left in the half. The Colts closed out the half with another field goal by Vinatieri to reduce the Patriots' lead to 15 points.

The first possession of the third quarter belonged to the Colts, and they spent almost seven minutes on that drive, which ended with a 1-yard quarterback sneak by Peyton Manning. The Colts were now only down by one score, 21–13. After the Patriots went three-and-out on their next possession, the Colts did not waste time before scoring. Within three minutes, Peyton Manning threw a screen pass to DT Dan Klecko for a 1-yard touchdown to bring the Colts within two points of New England. Klecko was signed this offseason by the Colts after he was released by, ironically, the Patriots. After that touchdown catch, the Colts elected to go for the two-point conversion, and Manning completed a pass in the end zone to WR Marvin Harrison to tie the game at 21. The Patriots responded on the ensuing possession with a 6-yard touchdown pass to WR Jabar Gaffney in the back of the end zone. The Colts countered that touchdown with a score of their own, this one by C Jeff Saturday. He ended up with the football in the end zone when RB Dominic Rhodes fumbled at the 1-yard line. The game was now tied 28–28 with 13:24 left in the game. After punts were exchanged, the Patriots broke the tie when K Stephen Gostkowski made a 28-yard field goal to give the Patriots the lead by 3 points. Adam Vinatieri made another field goal for the Colts right after Gostkowski's previous field goal to tie the game at 31, but Gostkowski then converted another field goal with 3:49 left in the game to put the Patriots back on top, 34–31. After the teams exchanged punts again, the Colts had one final opportunity to take the lead with 2:17 left in the game, and the ball on their own 20-yard line. After two passes completed to WR Reggie Wayne totaling 25 yards, and a 32-yard completion to TE Bryan Fletcher, the Colts had the ball on the Patriots 11-yard line. Three plays later, rookie RB Joseph Addai ran right up the middle for a 3-yard touchdown to put the Colts up by 4 points, and give them their first lead of the game, 38–34. The Patriots had exactly 1:00 to put together a winning drive, but on the drive's fourth play, Colts CB Marlin Jackson intercepted Tom Brady with less than 20 seconds to play and he quickly dropped to the ground so that there would be no risk of a fumble, sealing the win for the Colts. Their 18-point comeback was the biggest in conference title game history, and would later be matched by the 2021 Cincinnati Bengals.

With the win, Indianapolis improved their overall record to 15–4 that season and would move on to face the NFC champion Chicago Bears in Super Bowl XLI at Dolphin Stadium.

==== Super Bowl XLI: vs. (N1) Chicago Bears ====
Super Bowl XLI: (A3) Indianapolis Colts vs. (N1) Chicago Bears – Game summary

Quarter	1	2	3	4	Total
Colts	6	10	6	7	29
Bears	14	0	3	0	17

at Dolphin Stadium, Miami Gardens, Florida

- Date: February 4, 2007
- Game time: 6:30 p.m. EST
- Game weather: Cloudy, 67 °F (19 °C)
- Game attendance: 74,512
- Referee: Tony Corrente
- TV announcers (CBS): Jim Nantz and Phil Simms
- Box score

Game information

First quarter

- CHI – Devin Hester 92-yard kickoff return (Robbie Gould kick), 14:46. Bears 7–0.
- IND – Reggie Wayne 53-yard pass from Peyton Manning (kick failed), 6:50. Bears 7–6. Drive: 9 plays, 80 yards, 4:30.
- CHI – Muhsin Muhammad 4-yard pass from Rex Grossman (Robbie Gould kick), 4:34. Bears 14–6. Drive: 4 plays, 57 yards, 2:00.

Second quarter

- IND – Adam Vinatieri 29-yard field goal, 11:17. Bears 14–9. Drive: 8 plays, 47 yards, 3:52.
- IND – Dominic Rhodes 1-yard run (Adam Vinatieri kick), 6:09. Colts 16–14. Drive: 7 plays, 58 yards, 3:08.

Third quarter

- IND – Adam Vinatieri 24-yard field goal, 7:26. Colts 19–14. Drive: 13 plays, 55 yards, 7:34.
- IND – Adam Vinatieri 20-yard field goal, 3:16. Colts 22–14. Drive: 6 plays, 54 yards, 2:07.
- CHI – Robbie Gould 44-yard field goal, 1:14. Colts 22–17. Drive: 6 plays, 14 yards, 2:02.'

Fourth quarter

- IND – Kelvin Hayden 56-yard interception return (Adam Vinatieri kick), 11:44. Colts 29–17.

Top passers

- IND – Peyton Manning – 25/38, 247 yards, TD, INT
- CHI – Rex Grossman – 20/28, 165 yards, TD, 2 INT

Top rushers

- IND – Dominic Rhodes – 21 rushes, 113 yards, TD
- CHI – Thomas Jones – 15 rushes, 112 yards

Top receivers

- IND – Joseph Addai – 10 receptions, 66 yards
- CHI – Desmond Clark – 6 receptions, 64 yards

Championship banner, as seen at the Colts new home, Lucas Oil Stadium.

Two weeks after their record-breaking comeback in the AFC Championship Game against the Patriots, the Colts flew to Dolphin Stadium for Super Bowl XLI against the NFC Champion Chicago Bears. Bears CB/KR/PR Devin Hester returned the opening kickoff 92 yards for a touchdown, the first time that has ever happened in Super Bowl history. After the extra point by Robbie Gould, Chicago had an early 7–0 lead. On the following possession for the Colts, QB Peyton Manning threw an interception on the Colts' seventh play from scrimmage. His pass intended for WR Marvin Harrison was intercepted by FS Chris Harris and the Bears had the ball on their own 35-yard line. After Chicago went three-and-out on that possession, the Colts were ready to even the score. The drive ended with a 53-yard touchdown pass from Peyton Manning to WR Reggie Wayne, but punter Hunter Smith mishandled the snap on the extra point and kicker Adam Vinatieri could not convert the PAT. However, Chicago would answer right back with a score of their own. QB Rex Grossman completed a 4-yard pass in the end zone to WR Muhsin Muhammad to increase Chicago's lead over Indianapolis, 14–6. After a Colts punt, the Bears had the ball on their own 48-yard line. On the second play of the drive, FS Bob Sanders caused RB Cedric Benson to fumble the football, and the Colts recovered. But, the Colts went three-and-out and could not take advantage of the turnover. After a Bears punt, the Colts spent four minutes on their next drive that ended with an Adam Vinatieri field goal. There were five turnovers in the first quarter, a first in Super Bowl history. This was most likely due to the rain and poor conditions that both teams were playing in.

In the second quarter, the Colts' next possession resulted in a touchdown by RB Dominic Rhodes and gave the Colts the lead for the first time in the game, 16–14. In the second half, the Colts got right back to work as Adam Vinatieri made another field goal, this one from 24-yards out, to make the score 19–14 in their favor. On the following Colts possession, Vinatieri came through yet again and converted a 20-yard field goal to put the Colts up by 8 points. The Bears immediately responded with a field goal of their own, but they would not score any more points in the half. QB Rex Grossman threw two crucial interceptions in the second half, the first was returned 56-yards for a touchdown by DB Kelvin Hayden. Four plays after Grossman's first interception, he was intercepted again, this time by FS Bob Sanders. Both interceptions thrown by Grossman were deep passes that were not thrown accurately.

The Colts defeated the Bears 29–17, and finished the season with an overall record of 16–4 and Colts Head Coach Tony Dungy became the very first African-American coach to win a Super Bowl. The game's MVP was Colts QB Peyton Manning, who finished the game 25 of 38 for 247 passing yards with one touchdown and one interception. Rookie RB Joseph Addai finished the game with 19 carries for 77 yards rushing and had 10 catches which is today four shy of the Super Bowl record. RB Dominic Rhodes had 113 rushing yards and one touchdown on 21 carries also.

== See also ==
- History of the Indianapolis Colts
- Indianapolis Colts seasons
- Colts-Patriots rivalry
