= Bryan Fletcher (American football) =

American football player (born 1979)

Bryan J. Fletcher
No. 81
- Position: Tight end

Personal information
- Born: March 23, 1979 (age 47); St. Louis, Missouri, U.S.
- Listed height: 6 ft 5 in (1.96 m)
- Listed weight: 230 lb (104 kg)

Career information
- High school: Hazelwood East (St. Louis)
- College: UCLA (1998–2001)
- NFL draft: 2002: 6th round, 210th overall pick

Career history
- Chicago Bears (2002)*; Tennessee Titans (2002)*; Chicago Bears (2002–2003)*; Indianapolis Colts (2004–2007)
- * Offseason or practice squad member only

Awards and highlights
- Super Bowl champion (XLI); Second-team All-Pac-10 (2001)

Career NFL statistics
- Receptions: 54
- Receiving yards: 547
- Receiving touchdowns: 5
- Stats at Pro Football Reference

Bryan Jamaile Fletcher (born March 23, 1979) is an American former professional football player who was a tight end in the National Football League (NFL). He played college football for the UCLA, and was selected in the sixth round of the 2002 NFL draft by the Chicago Bears. Fletcher was a member of the Indianapolis Colts Super Bowl XLI winning team.

== College career ==
Fletcher attended UCLA and was a letterman in football. He finished his college career with 30 receptions for 423 yards (14.1 yards per reception average) and three touchdowns. As a senior, Fletcher was an All-Pacific-10 Conference second-team selection and won the UCLA Best Leadership Award.

== Professional career ==
Fletcher was drafted by the Chicago Bears in the sixth round of the 2002 NFL draft with the 210th overall pick. Fletcher was a member of the Bears' and Tennessee Titans practice squads before signing with the Indianapolis Colts prior to the 2004 NFL season.

In three years with the Colts, Fletcher had 54 catches for 547 yards and 5 touchdowns. A memorable moment of Fletcher's career was making a key reception from Peyton Manning during the 2006 AFC Championship Game, where the Colts defeated the New England Patriots. After the 2008 NFL draft, Fletcher was waived by the Colts.

=== NFL career statistics ===
Legend
Won the Super Bowl

==== Regular season ====
Year	Team	Games		Receiving			
Year	Team	GP	GS	Rec	Yds	Avg	TD
2005	IND	16	12	18	202	11.2	3
2006	IND	15	2	18	202	11.2	2
2007	IND	15	3	18	143	7.9	0
Career		46	18	54	547	10.1	5

==== Playoffs ====
Year	Team	Games		Receiving			
Year	Team	GP	GS	Rec	Yds	Avg	TD
2005	IND	1	1	2	18	9.0	0
2006	IND	4	0	4	37	9.3	0
2007	IND	1	0	1	2	2.0	0
Career		6	1	7	57	8.1	0

== Personal life ==
Fletcher graduated from UCLA in 2001 with a Bachelor of Arts degree in English and later received a Master of Business Administration in Finance from The Kelley School of Business at Indiana University.

During his time with the Colts, Bryan was very active in the community, donating his time visiting local schools and hospitals. Fletcher also participated in an international internship at the U.S. Embassy in Madrid, Spain and with NFL Mexico. He spent much of his post-professional football career in the financial industry. Fletcher worked in Manhattan, New York where he was responsible for managing a portfolio of high net-worth clients.

Fletcher was sworn into office as a member of the California delegation of the United States Electoral College, which is known as the California College of Presidential Electors, for one day, December 14, 2020, representing California's 53rd congressional district. He cast his vote for United States President for Joe Biden and his vote for Vice President of the United States for Kamala Harris.

He is the younger brother of former San Diego Chargers running back Terrell Fletcher and older brother of Shaun Fletcher, former student-athlete and current Professor at San Jose State University.
