= Joseph Addai =

American football player (born 1983)

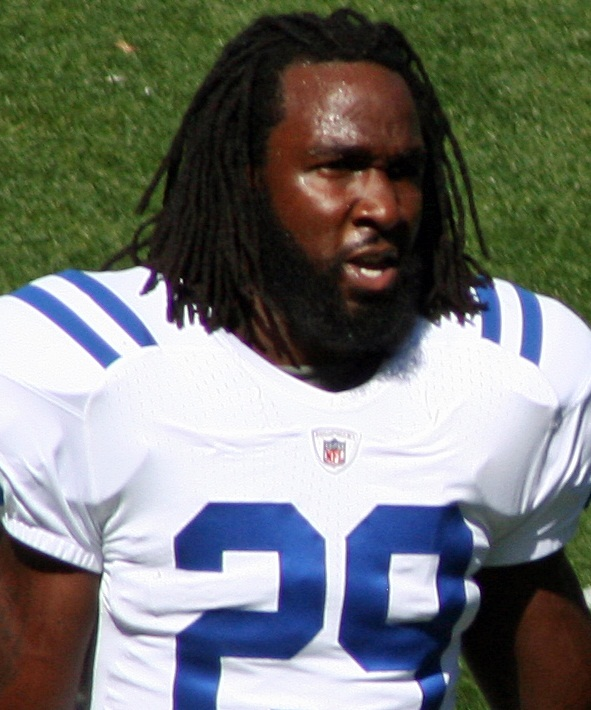
- Addai with the Indianapolis Colts in 2010

No. 29
- Position: Running back

Personal information
- Born: May 3, 1983 (age 43); Houston, Texas, U.S.
- Listed height: 5 ft 11 in (1.80 m)
- Listed weight: 214 lb (97 kg)

Career information
- High school: Sharpstown (Houston)
- College: LSU (2001–2005)
- NFL draft: 2006: 1st round, 30th overall pick

Career history
- Indianapolis Colts (2006–2011); New England Patriots (2012)*
- * Offseason or practice squad member only

Awards and highlights
- Super Bowl champion (XLI); Pro Bowl (2007); BCS national champion (2003)

Career NFL statistics
- Rushing yards: 4,453
- Rushing average: 4.1
- Rushing touchdowns: 39
- Receptions: 191
- Receiving yards: 1,448
- Receiving touchdowns: 9
- Stats at Pro Football Reference

Joseph Kwaku Duah Addai Jr. (/æˈdaɪ/ ad-EYE) (born May 3, 1983) is an American former professional football player who was a running back in the National Football League (NFL). He was selected by the Indianapolis Colts in the first round (30th overall pick) of the 2006 NFL draft out of Louisiana State University. He played for the team for six seasons where he won Super Bowl XLI as a rookie, defeating the Chicago Bears.

== Early life ==
Addai's family hails from Ghana in West Africa. In high school, Addai was a left-handed option-style quarterback for the Sharpstown Apollos. He played football and ran track. In his senior year, he rushed for 1,429 yards on 159 carries and completed 37 passes for 425 yards. He was chosen as a member of the 5A All-State first-team in Texas. He was named an All-American by ESPN and Fox Sports, and was rated as a top 100 recruit. In track, he was timed at 10.7 seconds in the 100-meter dash and at 22.1 seconds in the 200-meter dash.

== College career ==
During his tenure with the Louisiana State University Tigers, he ranked fifth all-time in rushing, with 2,577 yards, despite being primarily used as a blocking fullback early in his career. He wore two numbers while at LSU, 41 in his early years and then number 10 in his final years.

Addai started his stint at LSU in 2001, but after only two games was granted a medical redshirt. The following season, he carried the football 80 times, gaining 438 yards, and scoring four touchdowns. His first big game came against the University of South Carolina, during which he gained 98 yards on eleven carries and scored two touchdowns. On November 9, 2002, he amassed 91 yards, including a 63-yard run for a score, against the Kentucky Wildcats at Commonwealth Stadium. His performance helped to set the stage for The Bluegrass Miracle, a "miraculous" 74-yard game-winning touchdown pass from quarterback Marcus Randall to wide receiver Devery Henderson as time expired on the last play of the game.

Addai's sophomore season proved to be a banner year for LSU. Led by coach Nick Saban, the Tigers won the BCS National Championship, the first national championship for LSU since 1958. Addai ranked second to freshman Justin Vincent in rushing, gaining 520 yards on 114 attempts. He led LSU's early season 59–13 rout of the Arizona Wildcats with an 86-yard, two touchdown performance.

In 2004, he rushed for 680 yards on 101 carries and caught 24 passes for 294 yards, scoring a total of seven touchdowns. He stood out against the Alabama Crimson Tide in a 26-10 Tiger Stadium victory on November 13. He led the team in rushing with 99 yards and added another 46 yards receiving, as well as scoring two of the three Tiger touchdowns. for the day. The following week, he teamed with Alley Broussard (250 yards on 26 carries) to lead the Tigers to a 27–24 victory over the Ole Miss Rebels. Addai's 107 yards was part of an impressive 360 yard ground attack by the Tigers.

During his senior season, Addai led the team with 911 rushing yards on 187 carries, scoring nine touchdowns. The highlight of the regular season was a 21–17 victory over the Florida Gators in front of a record-setting 92,402 crowd. Addai sealed the victory for LSU with a three-yard touchdown run with 6:27 remaining on the clock. His career-best effort combined 156 yards rushing on 32 carries with 37 yards receiving on 3 catches.

On October 22, 2005, in a game against Auburn, Addai ran for 105 yards as the Tigers ended Auburn's winning streak that year by a score of 20–17. A crowd of 92,664 watched in Tiger Stadium.

Addai completed his tenure at LSU with a game in the Chick-fil-A Peach Bowl. In the Tigers' 40–3 victory over the Miami Hurricanes, he gained a total of 135 yards and two touchdowns.

Addai also ran track at LSU, where he posted personal bests of 10.70 seconds in the 100 meters and 22.10 seconds in the 200 meters. He graduated from LSU in December 2005 with a degree in general studies and a minor in economics.

== Professional career ==
Pre-draft measurables
Height	Weight	Arm length	Hand span	40-yard dash	10-yard split	20-yard split	20-yard shuttle	Three-cone drill	Vertical jump	Broad jump	Bench press
5 ft 11 1/4 in (1.81 m)	214 lb (97 kg)	31 3/8 in (0.80 m)	9 1/2 in (0.24 m)	4.40 s	1.50 s	2.53 s	4.47 s	7.09 s	38.5 in (0.98 m)	10 ft 5 in (3.18 m)	18 reps
All values from NFL Combine

=== Indianapolis Colts ===
Addai was selected in the first round (30th overall) of the 2006 NFL draft by the Indianapolis Colts. Addai was the third running back selected by the Colts in the first round since 1994, when they selected Marshall Faulk with the second overall pick in 1994 and Edgerrin James fourth overall in 1999.

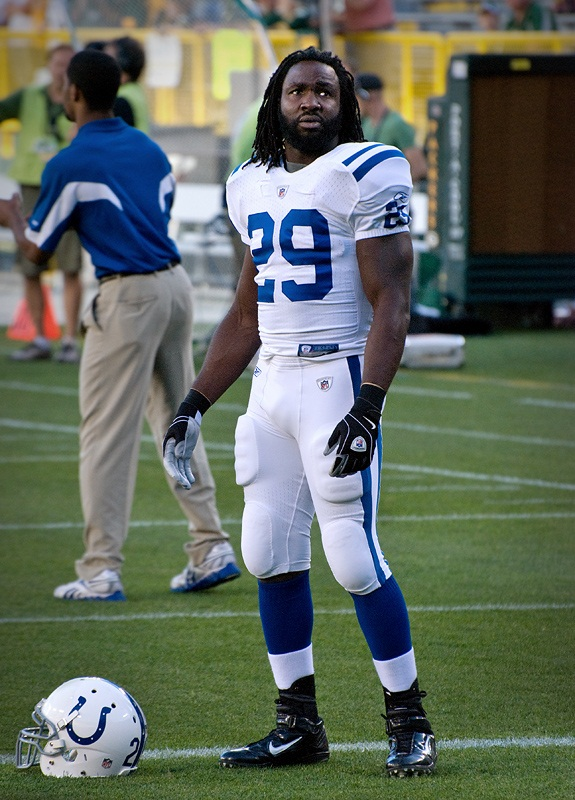
Joseph Addai with the Colts on August 26, 2010.

On November 26, 2006, Addai tied a Colts franchise record for most rushing touchdowns in a game held by Lenny Moore, Lydell Mitchell, and Eric Dickerson, as well as the NFL rookie record by rushing for 4 touchdowns against the Philadelphia Eagles. He was named the NFLs "Offensive Rookie of the Month" for November on December 7, 2006.

During the 2006 season, Addai led all rookie running backs in rushing yards with 1,081. Addai split time with Dominic Rhodes. Due to Rhodes starting all games in the 2006 regular season, Addai was the first NFL running back to exceed 1,000 rushing yards without starting a regular-season game. His first career start came on January 6, 2007, for the Colts/Chiefs wildcard playoff game. During the game, he ran for 122 yards and a touchdown on 25 carries and caught seven passes for 26 yards. The next week, in the divisional round of the playoffs, the Colts upset the favored Ravens 15–6. On January 21, 2007, in the AFC Championship Game against the New England Patriots, Addai scored the game-winning touchdown with 1:00 remaining, giving the Colts a victory and a trip to Super Bowl XLI. The Colts went on to win the Super Bowl over the Bears with their rush attack. Addai had 77 rushing yards and 10 receptions for 66 yards, for 143 total yards. His 10 receptions were the most ever by a running back in a Super Bowl, which left him one catch short of the overall record.

On November 4, 2007, in a Week 9 game against the New England Patriots, Addai became the first Indianapolis Colt ever to gain 100 yards receiving and 100 yards rushing in one game. Joseph was rewarded for his play in the 2007 season by being invited to his first and only Pro Bowl in January 2008.

On November 1, 2009, in a game against the San Francisco 49ers, Addai completed his first professional pass, a touchdown to Reggie Wayne.

Addai became an unrestricted free agent after the 2010 season and was re-signed by the Indianapolis Colts on July 31, 2011. Addai had his worst season statistically in 2011 as he rushed for 433 yards and only one touchdown. He was released following the 2011 season on March 9, 2012.

=== New England Patriots ===
On May 6, 2012, Addai agreed to a one-year contract with the New England Patriots. On July 24, he failed his physical at the start of training camp for the 2012 season. Addai was released by the Patriots on July 25, 2012.

== NFL career statistics ==
Year	Team	GP	Att	Yds	Avg	Lng	TD	Rec	Yds	Avg	Lng	TD
2006	IND	16	226	1,081	4.8	41	7	40	325	8.1	21	1
2007	IND	15	261	1,072	4.1	23	12	41	364	8.9	73	3
2008	IND	12	155	544	3.5	23	5	25	206	8.2	55	2
2009	IND	15	219	828	3.8	21	10	51	336	6.6	25	3
2010	IND	8	116	495	4.3	46	4	19	124	6.5	15	0
2011	IND	12	118	433	3.7	16	1	15	93	6.2	12	0
Career		78	1,095	4,453	4.1	46	39	191	1,448	7.6	73	9

== Personal life ==
Addai now resides in Houston with his wife Keion Addai, with whom he has three children.

Addai is the third cousin of soccer player Haji Wright who currently plays for Coventry City F.C. and has represented the United States men's national soccer team.
