= Kelvin Hayden =

American football player (born 1983)

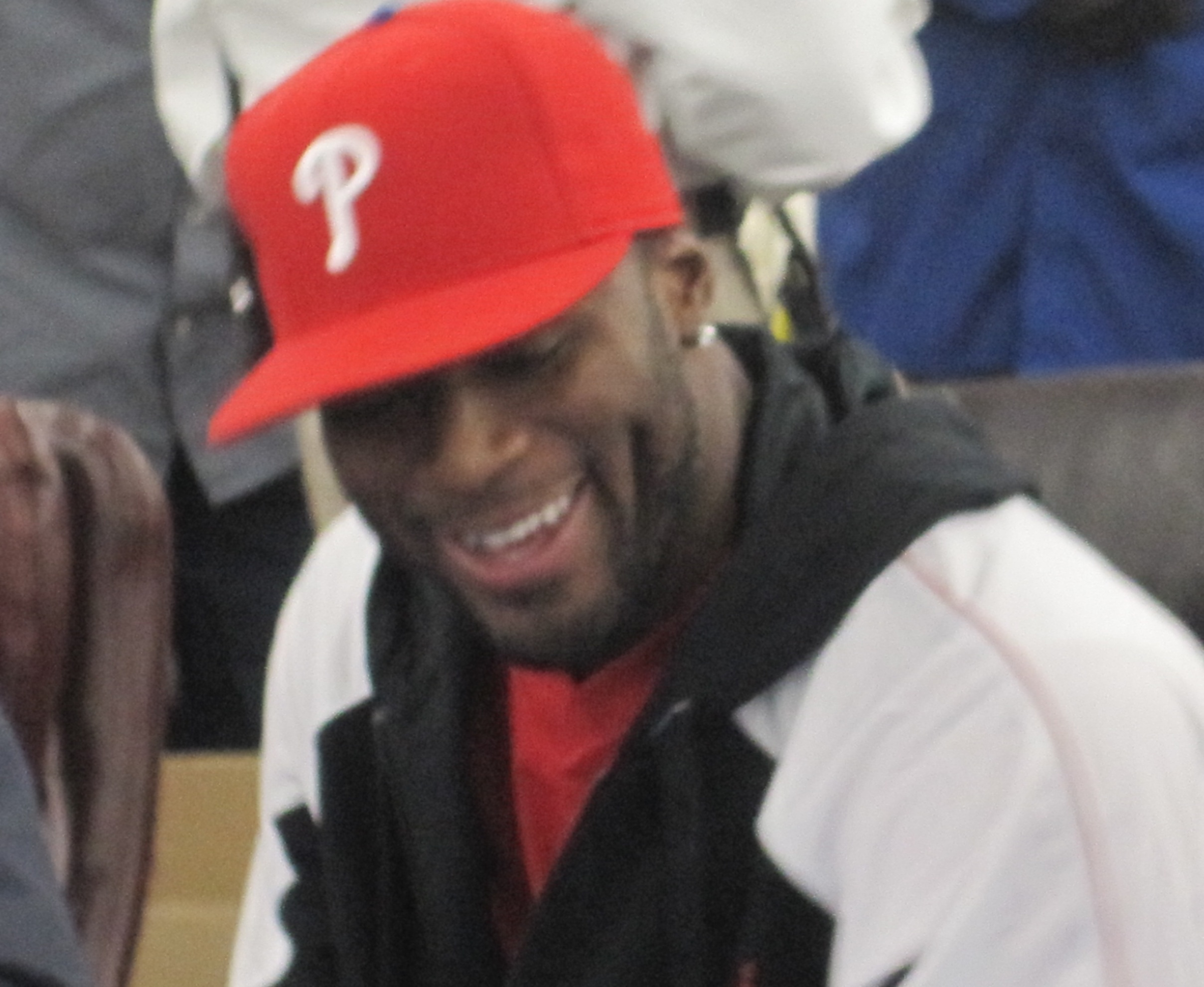
- Hayden in 2010

No. 26, 24
- Position: Cornerback

Personal information
- Born: July 23, 1983 (age 43); Chicago, Illinois, U.S.
- Listed height: 6 ft 0 in (1.83 m)
- Listed weight: 195 lb (88 kg)

Career information
- High school: Hubbard (Chicago)
- College: Illinois
- NFL draft: 2005: 2nd round, 60th overall pick

Career history
- Indianapolis Colts (2005–2010); Atlanta Falcons (2011); Chicago Bears (2012–2014)

Awards and highlights
- Super Bowl champion (XLI); Second-team All-Big Ten (2004)

Career NFL statistics
- Total tackles: 363
- Forced fumbles: 4
- Fumble recoveries: 6
- Pass deflections: 46
- Interceptions: 12
- Defensive touchdowns: 4
- Stats at Pro Football Reference

Kelvin Darnell Hayden Jr. (born July 23, 1983) is an American former professional football player who was a cornerback in the National Football League (NFL). He played college football for the Illinois Fighting Illini and was selected by the Indianapolis Colts in the second round of the 2005 NFL draft. In Super Bowl XLI he returned a Rex Grossman interception (the first of his career) 56 yards for a touchdown in a win over his hometown team, the Chicago Bears. Hayden played for the Bears and the Atlanta Falcons.

== Early life ==
Hayden attended Hubbard High School in Chicago, Illinois, where he was a four-year starter in football. As a freshman cornerback, he was a first-team All-PowerBar team selection and an All-Area selection after posting ten interceptions. As a sophomore quarterback, he passed for 21 touchdowns and rushed for seven more scores. As a junior tailback, he rushed for 2,135 yards (1,952 m), and was an All-Conference pick and an All-Area selection.

Hayden was a Chicago Bears fan during his youth.

== College career ==
=== Joliet Junior College ===
Hayden attended Joliet Junior College for two years, where he finished his career with 115 receptions for 1,839 yards (16.13 yards per rec. avg.) and 17 touchdowns and was a two-time All-Conference and an All-Region pick. After losing his first junior college game, he led Joliet JC to 21 consecutive victories and the 2002 NJCAA National Championship.

As a sophomore, he was the NJCAA National Offensive Player of the Year, won first-team JC All-America accolades, and was named the Conference Player of the Year, after making 72 receptions for 1,297 yards (18.1 yards per reception) and 13 touchdowns. He was named the MVP of the 2002 NCAA National Championship game. As a freshman, he made 42 receptions for 542 yards (12.9 yards per reception) and four touchdowns. He then transferred to Illinois.

=== University of Illinois ===
In 2003, Hayden led the Fighting Illini in receptions and receiving yards with 52 receptions for 592 yards. Prior to the 2004 season, he switched to cornerback. He started all 11 games and had 71 tackles and four interceptions.

== Professional career ==
=== Indianapolis Colts ===
Hayden was drafted in the second round (60th overall) by the Indianapolis Colts.

In his second season, Hayden recorded his first career interception in Super Bowl XLI when he took a Rex Grossman pass 56 yards for a touchdown, en route to a Colts 29–17 victory over the Chicago Bears. His stats as a Colt were 239 total tackles and nine interceptions, including three returned for touchdowns. Hayden scored a touchdown on a 26-yard fumble recovery in a game against the Philadelphia Eagles during the 2006 season.

=== Atlanta Falcons ===
Hayden had 16 total tackles and two interceptions during his one-year tenure in Atlanta.

=== Chicago Bears ===
On April 5, 2012, he signed with the Chicago Bears on a one-year contract worth $825,000. In Week 9 against the Tennessee Titans, Hayden recovered two forced fumbles. In 2012, Hayden and four other players led the league in defensive fumble recoveries with four. Despite becoming an unrestricted free agent in 2013, on March 26, Hayden signed a one-year deal to return to the Bears. On August 7, 2013, the Bears announced that Hayden suffered a torn hamstring and would miss the entire 2013 season. The injury occurred during Family Fest practice at Soldier Field on August 3, 2013. Hayden was eventually placed on injured reserve. Hayden became a free agent after the 2013 season but was re-signed on February 28, 2014. On August 30, 2014, the Bears waived him along with others during their final roster cuts. On September 2, 2014, he was re-signed by the Bears to fill an opening on the roster when wide receiver Marquess Wilson was placed on injured reserve. On September 13, 2014, the Bears released him and two others as they needed to fill some depth due to multiple injuries.

== NFL career statistics ==
Legend
	Led the league
**Bold**	Career high

=== Regular season ===
Year	Team	Games		Tackles					Interceptions					Fumbles			
Year	Team	GP	GS	Cmb	Solo	Ast	Sck	TFL	Int	Yds	TD	Lng	PD	FF	FR	Yds	TD
2005	IND	**16**	0	26	18	8	0.0	0	0	0	0	0	1	0	0	0	0
2006	IND	15	1	40	33	7	0.0	0	0	0	0	0	1	0	1	**26**	**1**
2007	IND	**16**	**16**	**83**	**71**	12	0.0	1	**3**	17	0	20	10	**2**	1	0	0
2008	IND	10	10	42	36	6	0.0	1	**3**	**135**	1	**85**	**12**	1	0	0	0
2009	IND	9	8	50	42	8	0.0	1	1	6	0	6	5	0	0	0	0
2010	IND	11	11	61	43	**18**	0.0	**3**	2	56	**2**	31	8	1	0	0	0
2011	ATL	8	1	24	16	8	0.0	1	2	3	0	2	4	0	0	0	0
2012	CHI	**16**	2	37	26	11	0.0	0	1	39	0	39	5	0	**4**	15	0
Career		101	49	363	285	78	0.0	7	12	256	3	85	46	4	6	41	1

=== Playoffs ===
Year	Team	Games		Tackles					Interceptions					Fumbles			
Year	Team	GP	GS	Cmb	Solo	Ast	Sck	TFL	Int	Yds	TD	Lng	PD	FF	FR	Yds	TD
2005	IND	1	0	2	2	0	0.0	0	0	0	0	0	0	0	0	0	0
2006	IND	**4**	0	8	7	**1**	0.0	0	**1**	**56**	**1**	**56**	1	0	0	0	0
2007	IND	1	1	3	2	**1**	0.0	0	**1**	1	0	1	1	0	0	0	0
2008	IND	1	1	2	2	0	0.0	**1**	0	0	0	0	0	0	0	0	0
2009	IND	3	**3**	**18**	**17**	**1**	0.0	0	**1**	3	0	3	**2**	**2**	0	0	0
Career		10	5	33	30	3	0.0	1	3	60	1	56	4	2	0	0	0

== Personal life ==
Hayden got engaged to Taraji P. Henson on May 13, 2018, but Henson disclosed the end of the engagement during the October 19, 2020, episode of The Breakfast Club radio show.
