= 2009 Indianapolis Colts season =

57th season in franchise history; second Super Bowl loss

- Owner: Jim Irsay
- General manager: Chris Polian
- President: Bill Polian
- Head coach: Jim Caldwell
- Offensive coordinator: Tom Moore
- Defensive coordinator: Larry Coyer
- Home stadium: Lucas Oil Stadium

Results
- Record: 14–2
- Division place: 1st AFC South
- Playoffs: Won Divisional Playoffs (vs. Ravens) 20–3; Won AFC Championship (vs. Jets) 30–17; Lost Super Bowl XLIV (vs. Saints) 17–31
- All-Pros: 4 (see Awards and honors)
- Pro Bowlers: 7 (see Awards and honors)

Uniform
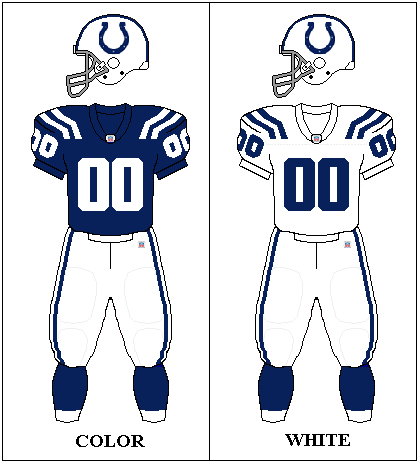

The 2009 season was the Indianapolis Colts' 57th in the National Football League (NFL), their 26th in Indianapolis, and their second playing their home games at Lucas Oil Stadium. It was the first season since 2001 that the Colts did not have Tony Dungy on their coaching staff, due to his retirement from coaching. Dungy's long time assistant, Jim Caldwell (who had been with Dungy since 2001 when he was still the head coach of the Tampa Bay Buccaneers) was named the new head coach. The 2009 Indianapolis Colts improved upon their 12–4 record from 2008 as well as winning their sixth AFC South division championship in seven years with a 14–2 record. The Colts also clinched the top seed in the AFC. The Colts were the sole undefeated team after Week 15. The following week, the Colts lost to the New York Jets after benching their starters. During the playoffs, the Colts defeated the Baltimore Ravens in the divisional round and the New York Jets in the AFC Championship Game and represented the AFC in Super Bowl XLIV. The 14–2 Colts lost to the 13–3 New Orleans Saints in Super Bowl XLIV, 31–17.

This was the first season since 1995 that Marvin Harrison was not on the opening-day roster, as he retired during the offseason.

== Offseason ==
=== Head coach announcement ===
On January 12, 2009, Head coach Tony Dungy announced his retirement from coaching in the National Football League (NFL). Two days later, then-assistant head coach and quarterbacks coach Jim Caldwell was formally announced as Dungy's successor.

=== Staff changes ===
- Clyde Christensen replaced Jim Caldwell as assistant head coach.
- Larry Coyer replaced Ron Meeks as defensive coordinator (Meeks resigned).
- Tom Moore originally decided to retire from coaching in the National Football League due to a revision in the league's pension plan for non-players. Almost four months later, he was re-hired by the Colts as their Senior Offensive Coordinator.
- Howard Mudd originally decided to retire from coaching in the National Football League due to a revision in the league's pension plan for non-players. Almost four months later, he was re-hired by the Colts as their Senior Offensive Line Coach.
- Frank Reich replaced Jim Caldwell as quarterbacks coach.
- Ray Rychleski replaced Russ Purnell as special teams coach.

=== Additions ===
Pos.	Player	Date	Notes
OG	Brandon Barnes	April 23, 2009	
WR	Hank Baskett	September 17, 2009	
RB	Donald Brown	August 2, 2009	Drafted by Colts in 2009 NFL Draft
TE	Colin Cloherty	April 27, 2009; September 7, 2009	Added to practice squad
WR	Austin Collie	August 1, 2009	Drafted by Colts in 2009 NFL Draft
QB	Chris Crane	April 4, 2009	
C	Kyle DeVan	April 21, 2009	
S	Aaron Francisco	September 6, 2009	
WR	Sam Giguère	September 7, 2009	Added to practice squad
DT	John Gill	September 7, 2009	Added to practice squad
LB	Cody Glenn	September 6, 2009	Later assigned to the practice squad
DE	Rudolph Hardie	August 13, 2009	
RB	Mike Hart	September 7, 2009	Added to practice squad
DT	Ed Johnson	April 5, 2009	
WR	John Matthews	September 7, 2009	Added to practice squad
P	Pat McAfee	July 29, 2009	Drafted by Colts in 2009 NFL Draft
RB	Walter Mendenhall	August 13, 2009; August 22, 2009	
DT	Fili Moala	August 1, 2009	Drafted by Colts in 2009 NFL Draft
LB	Michael Okwo	February 16, 2009	
QB	Curtis Painter	July 29, 2009	Drafted by Colts in 2009 NFL Draft
S	Marcus Paschal	August 22, 2009	
G	Tom Pestock	August 19, 2009	
TE	Jason Pociask	September 8, 2009	Added to practice squad
LB	Adam Seward	March 21, 2009	
WR	Taj Smith	September 7, 2009	Added to practice squad
LB	Michael Tauiliili	April 4, 2009	
DT	Terrance Taylor	July 29, 2009	Drafted by Colts in 2009 NFL Draft
OG	Jaimie Thomas	July 29, 2009; September 7, 2009	Drafted by Colts in 2009 NFL Draft; Added to practice squad

=== Departures ===
Pos.	Player	Date	Notes
LB	Rufus Alexander	April 4, 2009	
K	Shane Andrus	September 16, 2009	
RB	Lance Ball	September 5, 2009	
TE	Colin Cloherty	August 31, 2009	
CB	Michael Coe	August 31, 2009	Placed on waived-injured list
S	Brannon Condren	July 29, 2009	
QB	Chris Crane	August 22, 2009	
LB	Buster Davis	March 30, 2009	
P	Mike Dragosavich	April 4, 2009	
CB	Brandon Foster	July 29, 2009	
WR	Sam Giguère	September 5, 2009	
DT	John Gill	September 5, 2009	
S	Matt Giordano	September 6, 2009	
DT	Adrian Grady	September 5, 2009	
CB	Nick Graham	September 5, 2009	
WR	Roy Hall	August 13, 2009	Placed on waived-injured list
DE	Rudolph Hardie	August 31, 2009	Placed on waived-injured list
S	Brandon Harrison	July 29, 2009	
WR	Marvin Harrison	February 24, 2009	
RB	Mike Hart	September 5, 2009	
T	Corey Hilliard	August 19, 2009	
DE	Marcus Howard	September 5, 2009	
CB	Dante Hughes	September 5, 2009	
LB	Curtis Johnson	August 31, 2009	
C	Steve Justice	September 5, 2009	
S	Travis Key	September 6, 2009	Placed on waived-injured list
T	Pat Kuntz	July 29, 2009	
OL	Cornelius Lewis	July 29, 2009	
WR	John Matthews	September 5, 2009	
WR	Brett McDermott	September 5, 2009	
RB	Walter Mendenhall	August 18, 2009; September 5, 2009	
S	Marcus Paschal	September 1, 2009	
G	Tom Pestock	August 13, 2009; September 5, 2009	
TE	Jamie Petrowski	September 5, 2009	Placed on waived-injured list
LB	Tyrell Sales	July 29, 2009	
LB	Jordan Senn	September 7, 2009	
LB	Adam Seward	August 22, 2009	
WR	Taj Smith	September 5, 2009	
LB	Mike Tauiliili	September 5, 2009	
DT	Terrance Taylor	September 5, 2009	Drafted by Colts in 2009 NFL Draft
OG	Jaimie Thomas	September 5, 2009	
DE	Josh Thomas	September 5, 2009	
OT	Michael Toudouze	September 5, 2009	

=== Free agents ===
Pos.	Player	Tag	Result
RB	Lance Ball	ERFA	Re-signed with Colts
ILB	Buster Davis	ERFA	Signed with Texans
G/T	Daniel Federkeil	RFA	Re-signed with Colts
SS	Matt Giordano	UFA	Re-signed with Colts
CB	Kelvin Hayden	UFA	Re-signed with Colts
OLB	Tyjuan Hagler	UFA	Re-signed with Colts
OLB	Freddie Keiaho	UFA	Re-signed with Colts
DT	Daniel Muir	ERFA	Re-signed with Colts
CB	Keiwan Ratliff	UFA	Signed with Steelers
DT	Darrell Reid	UFA	Signed with Broncos
RB	Dominic Rhodes	UFA	Signed with Bills
C	Jeff Saturday	UFA	Re-signed with Colts
P	Hunter Smith	UFA	Signed with Redskins
DE	Josh Thomas	UFA	Re-signed with Colts
UFA: Unrestricted free agent; RFA: Restricted free agent; ERFA: Exclusive rights free agent

== 2009 NFL draft ==
2009 Indianapolis Colts Draft Selections
Draft order		Player	Position	Height	Weight	College
Round	Choice	Player	Position	Height	Weight	College
1	27	Donald Brown	Running back	5 ft 10 in (1.78 m)	208 lb (94 kg)	Connecticut
2	56	Fili Moala	Defensive tackle	6 ft 4 in (1.93 m)	303 lb (137 kg)	Southern California
3	92	Jerraud Powers	Cornerback	5 ft 10 in (1.78 m)	192 lb (87 kg)	Auburn
4	127	Austin Collie	Wide receiver	6 ft 2 in (1.88 m)	212 lb (96 kg)	Brigham Young
4	136	Terrance Taylor	Defensive tackle	6 ft 0 in (1.83 m)	319 lb (145 kg)	Michigan
6	201	Curtis Painter	Quarterback	6 ft 4 in (1.93 m)	225 lb (102 kg)	Purdue
7	222	Pat McAfee	Punter	5 ft 11 in (1.80 m)	228 lb (103 kg)	West Virginia
7	236	Jaimie Thomas	Guard	6 ft 4 in (1.93 m)	330 lb (149 kg)	Maryland

=== Undrafted free agents ===
Name	Position	College
Colin Cloherty	Tight end	Brown
Ramon Humber	Linebacker	North Dakota State
Jacob Lacey	Cornerback	Oklahoma State

== Staff ==
Indianapolis Colts 2009 staff
Front office: Owner/CEO – Jim Irsay; President – Bill Polian; Senior Executive Vice-president – Pete Ward; Executive vice-president – Bob Terpening; Vice-president/general manager – Chris Polian; Director of football administration – Steve Champlin; Director of player personnel – Tom Telesco; Director of Pro Player Personnel – Clyde Powers; Head coaches: Head coach – Jim Caldwell; Assistant head coach/wide receivers – Clyde Christensen; Offensive coaches: Senior offensive coordinator – Tom Moore; Quarterbacks – Frank Reich; Running backs – Gene Huey; Tight ends – Ricky Thomas; Senior offensive line – Howard Mudd; Offensive quality control/assistant offensive line – Pete Metzelaars	Defensive coaches: Defensive coordinator – Larry Coyer; Defensive line – John Teerlinck; Linebackers – Mike Murphy; Defensive backs – Alan Williams; Special assistant to the Defense – Rod Perry; Defensive assistant – Bill Teerlinck; Special teams coaches: Special teams coordinator – Ray Rychleski; Strength and conditioning: Strength and conditioning – Jon Torine; Assistant strength and conditioning – Richard Howell

== Roster ==
Indianapolis Colts 2009 final roster
Quarterbacks: 18 Peyton Manning; 7 Curtis Painter; Running backs: 29 Joseph Addai; 31 Donald Brown; 32 Mike Hart; 35 Chad Simpson; Wide receivers: 81 Hank Baskett; 17 Austin Collie; 85 Pierre Garçon; 14 Sam Giguère; 87 Reggie Wayne; Tight ends: 44 Dallas Clark; 46 Colin Cloherty; 47 Gijon Robinson; 84 Jacob Tamme	Offensive linemen: 66 Kyle DeVan G; 71 Ryan Diem T; 74 Charlie Johnson T; 65 Ryan Lilja G; 78 Mike Pollak G; 61 Jamey Richard C; 63 Jeff Saturday C; 75 Michael Toudouze T; 67 Tony Ugoh T; Defensive linemen: 94 Ervin Baldwin DE; 79 Raheem Brock DE; 96 Keyunta Dawson DE; 68 Eric Foster DE; 93 Dwight Freeney DE; 69 John Gill DT; 99 Antonio Johnson DT; 98 Robert Mathis DE; 95 Fili Moala DT; 90 Daniel Muir DT	Linebackers: 58 Gary Brackett MLB; 52 Cody Glenn OLB; 59 Ramon Humber OLB; 54 Freddy Keiaho MLB; 55 Clint Session OLB; 50 Philip Wheeler OLB; Defensive backs: 41 Antoine Bethea FS; 33 Melvin Bullitt SS; 43 Aaron Francisco SS; 26 Kelvin Hayden CB; 23 Tim Jennings CB; 27 Jacob Lacey CB; 25 Jerraud Powers CB; 20 T. J. Rushing CB; 40 Jamie Silva SS; Special teams: 1 Pat McAfee P; 48 Justin Snow LS; 3 Matt Stover K; 4 Adam Vinatieri K	Reserve lists: 76 Daniel Federkeil T (IR); 11 Anthony Gonzalez WR (IR); 56 Tyjuan Hagler LB (IR); -- Roy Hall WR (IR); 97 Rudolph Hardie DE (IR); 28 Marlin Jackson CB (IR); 80 Jamie Petrowski TE (IR); 21 Bob Sanders S (IR); 86 Tom Santi TE (IR); 12 Jim Sorgi QB (IR); Practice squad: 72 Keith Gray C; 34 Terrail Lambert CB; 83 John Matthews WR; 57 Brandon Renkart LB; 6 Taj Smith WR; 73 Jaimie Thomas G; 16 Drew Willy QB; rookies in italics 53 active, 10 inactive, 7 practice squad

== Schedule ==
=== Preseason ===
Week	Date	Opponent	Result	Record	Venue	Recap
1	August 14	Minnesota Vikings	L 3–13	0–1	Lucas Oil Stadium	Recap
2	August 20	Philadelphia Eagles	W 23–15	1–1	Lucas Oil Stadium	Recap
3	August 29	at Detroit Lions	L 17–18	1–2	Ford Field	Recap
4	September 3	at Cincinnati Bengals	L 7–38	1–3	Paul Brown Stadium	Recap

=== Regular season ===
Week	Date	Opponent	Result	Record	Venue	Recap
1	September 13	Jacksonville Jaguars	W 14–12	1–0	Lucas Oil Stadium	Recap
2	September 21	at Miami Dolphins	W 27–23	2–0	Land Shark Stadium	Recap
3	September 27	at Arizona Cardinals	W 31–10	3–0	University of Phoenix Stadium	Recap
4	October 4	Seattle Seahawks	W 34–17	4–0	Lucas Oil Stadium	Recap
5	October 11	at Tennessee Titans	W 31–9	5–0	LP Field	Recap
6	Bye					
7	October 25	at St. Louis Rams	W 42–6	6–0	Edward Jones Dome	Recap
8	November 1	San Francisco 49ers	W 18–14	7–0	Lucas Oil Stadium	Recap
9	November 8	Houston Texans	W 20–17	8–0	Lucas Oil Stadium	Recap
10	November 15	New England Patriots	W 35–34	9–0	Lucas Oil Stadium	Recap
11	November 22	at Baltimore Ravens	W 17–15	10–0	M&T Bank Stadium	Recap
12	November 29	at Houston Texans	W 35–27	11–0	Reliant Stadium	Recap
13	December 6	Tennessee Titans	W 27–17	12–0	Lucas Oil Stadium	Recap
14	December 13	Denver Broncos	W 28–16	13–0	Lucas Oil Stadium	Recap
15	December 17	at Jacksonville Jaguars	W 35–31	14–0	Jacksonville Municipal Stadium	Recap
16	December 27	New York Jets	L 15–29	14–1	Lucas Oil Stadium	Recap
17	January 3, 2010	at Buffalo Bills	L 7–30	14–2	Ralph Wilson Stadium	Recap

== Standings ==
AFC South
	W	L	T	PCT	DIV	CONF	PF	PA	STK
^{(1)} Indianapolis Colts	14	2	0	.875	6–0	10–2	416	307	L2
Houston Texans	9	7	0	.563	1–5	6–6	388	333	W4
Tennessee Titans	8	8	0	.500	2–4	4–8	354	402	W1
Jacksonville Jaguars	7	9	0	.438	3–3	6–6	290	380	L4

== Game summaries ==
=== Week 1: vs. Jacksonville Jaguars ===
Week 1: Jacksonville Jaguars at Indianapolis Colts – Game summary

- Game time: 1:00 PM EDT
- Game weather: 74 °F (Sunny)
- TV announcers (CBS): Kevin Harlan and Solomon Wilcots
- Game attendance: 65,757 at Lucas Oil Stadium, Indianapolis, Indiana
- Referee: Tony Corrente

First quarter

- No scoring play

Second quarter

- JAC – (9:02) Josh Scobee 24-yard field goal is GOOD. Drive: 11 plays, 59 yards, in 4:55. (Jaguars 3–0)
- IND – (3:43) Joseph Addai left tackle for 3 yards, TOUCHDOWN. Extra point converted. Drive: 11 plays, 78 yards, in 5:19. (Colts 7–3)
- JAC – (1:04) Josh Scobee 41-yard field goal is GOOD. Drive: 8 plays, 41 yards, in 2:40. (Colts 7–6)

Third quarter

- IND – (7:04) Peyton Manning pass deep left to Reggie Wayne for 35 yards, TOUCHDOWN. Extra point converted. Drive: 10 plays, 86 yards, 5:34. (Colts 14–6)

Fourth quarter

- JAC – (11:12) Maurice Jones-Drew left end for 7 yards, TOUCHDOWN. Two-point conversion fails. Drive: 11 plays, 58 yards, 5:30. (Colts 14–12)

	1	2	3	4	Total
Jaguars	0	6	0	6	12
Colts	0	7	7	0	14

Top passers

- JAC – David Garrard – 14/28, 122 yards, 0 TD, 0 INT
- IND – Peyton Manning – 28/38, 301 yards, 1 TD, 1 INT

Top rushers

- JAC – Maurice Jones-Drew – 21 carries, 97 yards, 1 TD
- IND – Joseph Addai – 17 carries, 42 yards, 1 TD

Top receivers

- JAC – Torry Holt – 3 receptions, 47 yards, 0 TD
- IND – Reggie Wayne – 10 receptions, 162 yards, 1 TD

Top tacklers

- JAC – Justin Durant (10.5)
- IND – Gary Brackett (9)

With the win the Colts started out the season 1–0 and improved their regular season winning streak to 9 games.

=== Week 2: at Miami Dolphins ===
Week 2: Indianapolis Colts at Miami Dolphins – Game summary

- Game time: 8:30 PM EDT
- Game weather: 84 °F (Cloudy)
- TV announcers (ESPN): Mike Tirico, Ron Jaworski, Jon Gruden, and Suzy Kolber
- Game attendance: 66,227 at Land Shark Stadium, Miami Gardens, Florida
- Referee: Terry McAulay

First quarter

- IND – (15:00) Peyton Manning pass deep center to Dallas Clark for 80 yards, TOUCHDOWN. Extra point converted. Drive: 1 play, 80 yards, 0:12. (Colts 7–0)
- MIA – (8:49) Ronnie Brown right guard for 14 yards, TOUCHDOWN. Extra point converted. Drive: 9 plays, 75 yards, 6:06. (Tied 7–7)

Second quarter

- MIA – (13:26) Dan Carpenter 45-yard field goal is GOOD. Drive: 13 plays, 53 yards, 7:24. (Dolphins 10–7)
- IND – (9:20) Adam Vinatieri 43-yard field goal is GOOD. Drive: 9 plays, 48 yards, 4:07. (Tied 10–10)
- MIA – (0:47) Dan Carpenter 44-yard field goal is GOOD. Drive: 9 plays, 33 yards, 2:23. (Dolphins 13–10)
- IND – (0:02) Adam Vinatieri 48-yard field goal is GOOD. Drive: 5 plays, 44 yards, 0:43. (Tied 13–13)

Third quarter

- No scoring play

Fourth quarter

- MIA – (13:29) Ronnie Brown up the middle for 3 yards, TOUCHDOWN. Extra point converted. Drive: 13 plays, 80 yards, 8:45. (Dolphins 20–13)
- IND – (10:12) Donald Brown up the middle for 15 yards, TOUCHDOWN. Extra point converted. Drive: 6 plays, 79 yards, 3:17. (Tied 20–20)
- MIA – (3:55) Dan Carpenter 45-yard field goal is GOOD. Drive: 10 plays, 51 yards, 6:16. (Dolphins 23–20)
- IND – (3:29) Peyton Manning pass short right to Pierre Garçon for 48 yards, TOUCHDOWN. Extra point converted. Drive: 4 plays, 80 yards, 0:32. (Colts 27–23)

	1	2	3	4	Total
Colts	7	6	0	14	27
Dolphins	7	6	0	10	23

Top passers

- IND – Peyton Manning – 14/23, 303 yards, 2 TD, 0 INT
- MIA – Chad Pennington – 22/33, 183 yards, 0 TD, 1 INT

Top rushers

- IND – Joseph Addai – 6 carries, 32 yards, 0 TD
- MIA – Ronnie Brown – 24 carries, 136 yards, 2 TD

Top receivers

- IND – Dallas Clark – 7 receptions, 183 yards, 1 TD
- MIA – Ted Ginn Jr. – 11 receptions, 108 yards, 0 TD

Top tacklers

- IND – Antoine Bethea (8)
- MIA – Yeremiah Bell (5)

With the win, not only did the Colts improve to 2–0, but Peyton Manning's 119th career victory would surpass Johnny Unitas for the most quarterback wins in franchise history. The win also helped the Colts' improved their winning streak to 10 games in the regular season. The Colts' offense would make the most of its time on the field, as they were only in the game for 14:53.

=== Week 3: at Arizona Cardinals ===
Week 3: Indianapolis Colts at Arizona Cardinals – Game summary

- Game time: 8:20 PM EDT
- Game weather: Played with roof closed, retractable roof stadium
- TV announcers (NBC): Al Michaels, Cris Collinsworth, and Andrea Kremer
- Game attendance: 62,692 at University of Phoenix Stadium, Glendale, Arizona
- Referee: Pete Morelli

First quarter

- ARI – (2:46) Neil Rackers 38-yard field goal is GOOD. Drive: 7 plays, 48 yards, 3:16. (Cardinals 3–0)

Second quarter

- IND – (9:11) Peyton Manning pass deep right to Reggie Wayne for 20 yards, TOUCHDOWN. Extra point converted. Drive: 11 plays, 95 yards, 5:09. (Colts 7–3)
- IND – (5:54) Peyton Manning pass short middle to Dallas Clark for 10 yards, TOUCHDOWN. Extra point converted. Drive: 6 plays, 57 yards, 2:24. (Colts 14–3)
- IND – (2:00) Peyton Manning pass deep right to Pierre Garçon for 53 yards, TOUCHDOWN. Extra point converted. Drive: 4 plays, 68 yards, 1:54. (Colts 21–3)

Third quarter

- ARI – (10:54) Kurt Warner pass short left to Anquan Boldin for 10 yards, TOUCHDOWN. Extra point converted. Drive: 8 plays, 73 yards, 4:10. (Colts 21–10)
- IND – (2:32) Peyton Manning pass short right to Joseph Addai for 3 yards, TOUCHDOWN. Extra point converted. Drive: 4 plays, 80 yards, 2:07. (Colts 28–10)

Fourth quarter

- IND – (11:35) Adam Vinatieri 26-yard field goal is GOOD. Drive: 6 plays, 32 yards, 3:22. (Colts 31–10)

	1	2	3	4	Total
Colts	0	21	7	3	31
Cardinals	3	0	7	0	10

Top passers

- IND – Peyton Manning – 24/35, 379 yards, 4 TD, 1 INT
- ARI – Kurt Warner – 30/52, 332 yards, 1 TD, 2 INT

Top rushers

- IND – Joseph Addai – 13 carries, 63 yards, 0 TD
- ARI – Tim Hightower – 9 carries, 22 yards, 0 TD

Top receivers

- IND – Reggie Wayne – 7 receptions, 126 yards, 1 TD
- ARI – Steve Breaston – 7 receptions, 94 yards, 0 TD

Top tacklers

- IND – Jerraud Powers (7)
- ARI – Karlos Dansby (8)

With the win the Colts improved to 3–0 and their regular season winning streak to 11 games.

=== Week 4: vs. Seattle Seahawks ===
Week 4: Seattle Seahawks at Indianapolis Colts – Game summary

- Game time: 1:00 PM EDT
- Game weather: 56 °F (Partly Cloudy)
- TV announcers (Fox): Dick Stockton, Charles Davis, and Jaime Maggio
- Game attendance: 66,112 at Lucas Oil Stadium, Indianapolis, Indiana
- Referee: Mike Carey

First quarter

- IND – (6:12) Donald Brown up the middle for 1 yard, TOUCHDOWN. Extra point converted. Drive: 10 plays, 80 yards, 5:38. (Colts 7–0)

Second quarter

- IND – (5:36) Peyton Manning pass short left to Reggie Wayne for 5 yards, TOUCHDOWN. Extra point converted. Drive: 9 plays, 90 yards, 4:01. (Colts 14–0)
- SEA – (1:26) Olindo Mare 38-yard field goal is GOOD. Drive: 11 plays, 57 yards, 4:07. (Colts 14–3)
- IND – (0:09) Peyton Manning pass deep right to Austin Collie for 21 yards, TOUCHDOWN. Extra point converted. Drive: 9 plays, 78 yards, 1:19. (Colts 21–3)

Third quarter

- IND – (8:06) Joseph Addai up the middle for 12 yards, TOUCHDOWN. Extra point converted. Drive: 12 plays, 80 yards, 6:58. (Colts 28–3)

Fourth quarter

- IND – (8:56) Adam Vinatieri 37-yard field goal is GOOD. Drive: 7 plays, 29 yards, 3:08. (Colts 31–3)
- IND – (6:59) Adam Vinatieri 19-yard field goal is GOOD. Drive: 4 plays, 4 yards, 1:16. (Colts 34–3)
- SEA – (3:05) Seneca Wallace scrambles up the middle for 7 yards, TOUCHDOWN. Extra point converted. Drive: 10 plays, 70 yards, 3:59. (Colts 34–10)
- SEA – (0:22) Seneca Wallace pass short right to Owen Schmitt for 1 yard, TOUCHDOWN. Extra point converted. Drive: 8 plays, 54 yards, 2:40. (Colts 34–17)

	1	2	3	4	Total
Seahawks	0	3	0	14	17
Colts	7	14	7	6	34

Top passers

- SEA – Seneca Wallace – 33/45, 257 yards, 1 TD, 0 INT
- IND – Peyton Manning – 31/41, 353 yards, 2 TD, 1 INT

Top rushers

- SEA – Julius Jones – 11 carries, 25 yards, 0 TD
- IND – Joseph Addai – 12 carries, 46 yards, 1 TD

Top receivers

- SEA – T. J. Houshmandzadeh – 8 receptions, 103 yards, 0 TD
- IND – Dallas Clark – 8 receptions, 80 yards, 0 TD

Top tacklers

- SEA – Jordan Babineaux (8.5)
- IND – Jerraud Powers (6)

With the win, the Colts improved to 4–0 and made their record 12 straight regular season games. Colts QB Peyton Manning would tie Fran Tarkenton for the third–most career touchdown passes in NFL history (342), behind only Brett Favre and Dan Marino. Also, Colts head coach Jim Caldwell would become the franchise's first rookie head coach since Lindy Infante in 1996 to win their first four games.

=== Week 5: at Tennessee Titans ===
Week 5: Indianapolis Colts at Tennessee Titans – Game summary

- Game time: 8:20 PM EDT
- Game weather: 56 °F (Partly Cloudy)
- TV announcers (NBC): Al Michaels, Cris Collinsworth, and Andrea Kremer
- Game attendance: 69,143 at LP Field, Nashville, Tennessee
- Referee: Mike Carey

First quarter

- IND – (7:28) Reggie Wayne 3-yard pass from Peyton Manning, TOUCHDOWN. Extra Point converted. Drive: 5 plays, 23 yards, 1:35. (Colts 7–0)
- TEN – (4:20) Rob Bironas 49-yard field goal is GOOD. Drive: 4 plays, 6 yards, 1:31. (Colts 7–3)
- TEN – (0:28) Rob Bironas 43-yard field goal is GOOD. Drive: 4 plays, 9 yards, 2:37 (Colts 7–6)

Second quarter

- IND – Joseph Addai 1-yard run, TOUCHDOWN. Extra Point converted. Drive: 12 plays, 81 yards, 6:46. (Colts 14–6)
- TEN – Rob Bironas 46-yard field goal is GOOD. Drive: 12 plays, 52 yards, 3:54. (Colts 14–9)
- IND – Austin Collie 39-yard pass from Peyton Manning, TOUCHDOWN. Extra Point converted. Drive: 6 plays, 93 yards, 0:47. (Colts 21–9)

Third quarter

- IND – (9:53) Austin Collie 6-yard pass from Peyton Manning, TOUCHDOWN. Extra Point converted. Drive: 7 plays, 31 yards, 3:46. (Colts 28–9)

Fourth quarter

- IND – Adam Vinatieri 23-yard field goal is GOOD. Drive: 15 plays, 70 yards, 8:38. (Colts 31–9)

	1	2	3	4	Total
Colts	7	14	7	3	31
Titans	6	3	0	0	9

Top passers

- IND – Peyton Manning – 36/44, 309 yards, 3 TD, 1 INT
- TEN – Kerry Collins – 19/32, 164 yards, 0 TD, 1 INT

Top rushers

- IND – Joseph Addai – 14 carries, 27 yards, 1 TD
- TEN – LenDale White – 10 carries, 51 yards, 0 TD

Top receivers

- IND – Austin Collie – 8 receptions, 97 yards, 2 TD
- TEN – Bo Scaife – 4 receptions, 45 yards, 0 TD

Top tacklers

- IND – Clint Session (9)
- TEN – Keith Bulluck (11)

With the win the Colts improved to 5–0 into their bye week and increased their winning streak to 13 games.

=== Week 7: at St. Louis Rams ===
	1	2	3	4	Total
Colts	14	7	7	14	42
Rams	3	0	3	0	6

at Edward Jones Dome, St. Louis, Missouri

- Game time: 1:00 PM EDT
- Game weather: None (Domed Stadium)
- Game attendance: 60,108
- Referee: Carl Cheffers
- TV announcers (CBS): Kevin Harlan and Solomon Wilcots

Coming off their bye week, the Colts flew to the Edward Jones Dome for a Week 7 interconference duel with the St. Louis Rams. Indianapolis came out of the gates early in the first quarter as quarterback Peyton Manning completed a six-yard touchdown pass to wide receiver Reggie Wayne. The Rams would respond with a 30-yard field goal from kicker Josh Brown, yet the Colts answered with Manning hooking up with tight end Dallas Clark on a 22-yard touchdown pass. Afterwards, running back Joseph Addai would acquire the only score of the second quarter with a six-yard touchdown.

St. Louis would begin the third quarter with Brown booting a 45-yard field goal, yet Indianapolis calmly responded with rookie cornerback Jacob Lacey returning an interception 35 yards for a touchdown. Afterwards, the Colts closed out the game with Manning finding rookie wide receiver Austin Collie on an eight-yard touchdown pass and running back Chad Simpson getting a 31-yard touchdown run.

With the win, Indianapolis improved to 6–0 and increased their winning streak to 14 games.

- Scoring

First quarter

- IND – Reggie Wayne six-yard pass from Peyton Manning, 8:50 (Matt Stover kick), Colts 7–0. Drive: 12 plays, 90 yards, 6:10.
- STL – Josh Brown 30-yard field goal, 5:26. Colts 7–3. Drive: 8 plays, 69 yards, 3:24.
- IND – Dallas Clark 27-yard pass from Peyton Manning, 3:31 (Stover kick), Colts 14–3. Drive: 3 plays, 78 yards, 1:55.

Second quarter

- IND – Joseph Addai six-yard run (Stover kick), 1:57, Colts 21–3. Drive: 8 plays, 41 yards, 3:42.

Third quarter

- STL – Josh Brown 45-yard field goal, 5:07. Colts 21–6. Drive: 7 plays, 33 yards, 3:56.
- IND – Jacob Lacey 35-yard interception return (Stover kick), 1:00. Colts 28–6.

Fourth quarter

- IND – Austin Collie eight-yard pass from Peyton Manning, 3:42 (Stover kick), Colts 35–6. Drive: 11 plays, 93 yards, 6:47.
- IND – Chad Simpson 35-yard run, 2:29 (Stover kick), Colts 42–6. Drive: 1 play, 31 yards, 0:08.

=== Week 8: vs. San Francisco 49ers ===
	1	2	3	4	Total
49ers	7	7	0	0	14
Colts	3	6	3	6	18

at Lucas Oil Stadium, Indianapolis

- Game time: 1:00 PM EST
- Game weather: 49 °F (Sunny)
- Game attendance: 66,229
- Referee: Ed Hochuli
- TV announcers (Fox): Sam Rosen, Tim Ryan, and Laura Okmin

The Colts began three straight home games in Week 8 with an interconference duel against the San Francisco 49ers. Indianapolis would find themselves trailing in the first quarter as 49ers running back Frank Gore got a 64-yard touchdown run. The Colts answered with kicker Matt Stover getting a 38-yard field goal. In the second quarter, Indianapolis crept closer as Stover made a 33-yard field goal, yet San Francisco answered with quarterback Alex Smith completing an eight-yard touchdown pass to tight end Vernon Davis. The Colts closed out the half with a 31-yard field goal from Stover.

In the second half, Indianapolis narrowed San Francisco's lead to two as Stover booted a 40-yard field goal. In the fourth quarter, they executed a halfback option play as running back Joseph Addai's threw a 22-yard touchdown pass to wide receiver Reggie Wayne. Afterwards, the defense held off against the various comeback attempts from the 49ers.

With the win, the Colts improved to 7–0 for the fourth time in five seasons and they set a franchise record with 15 consecutive regular season wins.

Also, quarterback Peyton Manning (31/48 for 347 yards) joined Dan Marino, Brett Favre, and John Elway as the only players in NFL history to complete 4,000 career passes. In addition, he became the fastest to reach the milestone as he reached it in 183 games.

- Scoring

First quarter

- SF – Frank Gore 64-yard run (Joe Nedney kick), 11:16, 49ers 7–0. Drive: 2 plays, 70 yards, 0:46.
- IND – Matt Stover 38-yard field goal, 3:16. 49ers 7–3. Drive: 10 plays, 57 yards, 4:40.

Second quarter

- IND – Matt Stover 33-yard field goal, 14:50. 49ers 7–6. Drive: 5 plays, 19 yards, 1:17.
- SF – Vernon Davis 8-yard pass from Alex Smith, 0:38 (Nedney kick), 49ers 14–6. Drive: 7 plays, 74 yards, 1:19.
- IND – Matt Stover 31-yard field goal, 0:06, 49ers 14–9. Drive: 3 plays, 48 yards, 0:32.

Third quarter

- IND – Matt Stover 40-yard field goal, 9:34, 49ers 14–12. Drive: 11 plays, 52 yards, 5:26.

Fourth quarter

- IND – Reggie Wayne 22-yard pass from Joseph Addai, 14:53 (two-point conversion failed), Colts 18–14. Drive: 9 plays, 70 yards, 3:10.

=== Week 9: vs. Houston Texans ===
	1	2	3	4	Total
Texans	0	3	7	7	17
Colts	10	3	0	7	20

at Lucas Oil Stadium, Indianapolis

- Game time: 1:00 PM EST
- Game weather: 69 °F (Sunny)
- Game attendance: 66,033
- Referee: Jeff Triplette
- TV announcers (CBS): Kevin Harlan & Solomon Wilcots

Coming off their win over the 49ers, the Colts stayed at home for a Week 9 AFC South duel with the Houston Texans. Indianapolis would get off to a fast start in the first quarter as quarterback Peyton Manning completed a seven-yard touchdown pass to running back Joseph Addai, followed by kicker Matt Stover nailing a 22-yard field goal. The Colts would add onto their lead in the second quarter as Stover booted a 37-yard field goal, while the Texans would close out the half with a 56-yard field goal from kicker Kris Brown.

In the third quarter, Houston began to rally as quarterback Matt Schaub found running back Ryan Moats on a one-yard touchdown pass. The Texans would take the lead in the fourth quarter with a one-yard touchdown run from running back Steve Slaton, yet Indianapolis regained the lead with Addai's two-yard touchdown run. The Texans attempted to force the game into overtime with a 42-yard field goal attempt, which went wide left.

With the win, the Colts improved to 8–0 for the third time in five seasons as well as increasing their winning streak to 16 games.

Peyton Manning (34/50 for 318 yards, 1 TD, 1 INT) would become the first quarterback in NFL history to throw for 40,000 yards in one decade.

Jim Caldwell would become the first rookie head coach to start 8–0 since Potsy Clark in 1931.

- Scoring

First quarter

- IND – Joseph Addai 7-yard pass from Peyton Manning, 6:20 (Matt Stover kick), Colts 7–0. Drive: 12 plays, 79 yards, 4:39.
- IND – Matt Stover 22-yard field goal, 3:58, Colts 10–0. Drive: 6 plays, 41 yards, 2:06.

Second quarter

- IND – Matt Stover 37-yard field goal, 12:50, Colts 13–0. Drive: 10 plays, 61 yards, 3:51.
- HOU – Kris Brown 56-yard field goal, 0:01, Colts 13–3. Drive: 5 plays, 12 yards, 0:56.

Third quarter

- HOU – Ryan Moats 1-yard pass from Matt Schaub, 8:31 (Kris Brown kick), Colts 13–10. Drive: 12 plays, 86 yards, 6:29.

Fourth quarter

- HOU – Steve Slaton 1-yard run, 14:58 (Kris Brown kick), Texans 17–13. Drive: 12 plays, 84 yards, 6:41.
- IND – Joseph Addai 2-yard run, 7:11 (Matt Stover kick), Colts 20–17. Drive: 8 plays, 61 yards, 3:49.

=== Week 10: vs. New England Patriots ===
	1	2	3	4	Total
Patriots	7	17	0	10	34
Colts	7	7	0	21	35

at Lucas Oil Stadium, Indianapolis

- Game time: 8:20 PM EST
- Game weather: Played with roof closed, retractable roof stadium
- Game attendance: 67,476
- Referee: Scott Green
- TV announcers (NBC): Al Michaels, Cris Collinsworth, and Andrea Kremer

The Indianapolis Colts and New England Patriots set up for their rivalry game at Lucas Oil Stadium. The Colts came in at 8–0 while the Patriots came in 6–2, both shooting for home field advantage during the playoffs. The Colts struck first with a 15-yard touchdown pass from Manning to Addai. However New England answered with 24 unanswered points in the first and second quarter. The Colts finally got back into the game with a 20-yard touchdown pass to Reggie Wayne towards the end of the first half. The third quarter was scoreless with the Colts still trailing by 10, but the Patriots started the fourth with a touchdown pass to Randy Moss with the Patriots now leading 31–14. The Colts came back quickly scoring a touchdown, making it 31–21. After a New England field goal, the Colts scored a touchdown on an Addai run. The Patriots were still in the lead 34–28, however the Colts were hot with Peyton Manning ready to lead them to a win if the defense could hold the Patriot offense for one more drive. With less the two and a half minutes remaining in the game, the New England Patriots were faced with a fourth and two on their own 28-yard line. Bill Belichick decided to go for it on a controversial play, where Brady threw to Kevin Faulk, who gained control of the ball behind the first down marker, forcing the Patriots to turn the ball over on downs. Having wasted their last time out on the preceding play and the play occurring before the two-minute warning, the Patriots couldn't challenge the ruling on the field. With a minute left Peyton Manning found Reggie Wayne for the touchdown. The game-winning extra point sealed a 35–34 victory over the Patriots as the team improved to 9–0 and their winning streak continued with 17 games.

- Scoring

First quarter

- IND – Joseph Addai 15-yard pass from Peyton Manning, 8:19 (Matt Stover kick), Colts 7–0. Drive: 8 plays, 90 yards, 3:28.
- NE – Laurence Maroney 1-yard run, 4:47 (Stephen Gostkowski kick), Tied 7–7. Drive: 6 plays, 73 yards, 3:32.

Second quarter

- NE – Stephen Gostkowski 31-yard field goal, 13:15, Patriots 10–7. Drive: 11 plays, 58 yards, 4:52.
- NE – Randy Moss 63-yard pass from Tom Brady, 11:18 (Gostkowski kick), Patriots 17–7. Drive: 2 plays, 75 yards, 0:51.
- NE – Julian Edelman 9-yard pass from Tom Brady, 7:19, (Gostkowski kick) Patriots 24–7. Drive: 5 plays, 57 yards, 2:12.
- IND – Reggie Wayne 20-yard pass from Peyton Manning, 4:17 (Stover kick), Patriots 24–14. Drive: 8 plays, 80 yards, 3:02.

Fourth quarter

- NE – Randy Moss five-yard pass from Tom Brady, 14:18 (Gostkowski kick), Patriots 31–14. Drive: 2 plays, 7 yards, 0:42.
- IND – Pierre Garçon 29-yard pass from Peyton Manning, 12:14 (Stover kick), Patriots 31–21. Drive: 5 plays, 79 yards, 2:04.
- NE – Stephen Gostkowski 36-yard field goal, 4:12, Patriots 34–21. Drive: 7 plays, 13 yards, 3:32.
- IND – Joseph Addai four-yard run, 2:23 (Stover kick), Patriots 34–28. Drive: 6 plays, 79 yards, 1:49.
- IND – Reggie Wayne 1-yard pass from Peyton Manning, 0:13 (Stover kick), Colts 35–34. Drive: 4 plays, 29 yards, 1:47.

=== Week 11: at Baltimore Ravens ===
	1	2	3	4	Total
Colts	7	7	0	3	17
Ravens	6	6	0	3	15

at M&T Bank Stadium, Baltimore

- Game time: 1:00 PM EST
- Game weather: 56 °F (Sunny)
- Game attendance: 71,320
- Referee: John Parry
- TV announcers (CBS): Greg Gumbel & Dan Dierdorf

Following their comeback win over the Patriots, the Colts flew to M&T Bank Stadium for a Week 11 duel with the Baltimore Ravens. In the first quarter, Indianapolis got on the board first with quarterback Peyton Manning passing to tight end Dallas Clark for a three-yard touchdown. Baltimore would respond as kicker Billy Cundiff made a 46-yard and a 44-yard field goal. In the second quarter, the Ravens took the lead with Cundiff nailing a 38-yard field goal, until the Colts came right back when running back Joseph Addai's five-yard touchdown run. The Ravens would close out the half with Cundiff booting a 36-yard field goal.

After a scoreless third quarter, Cundiff's 20-yard field goal gave the Ravens the lead again in the fourth quarter. Fortunately, Indianapolis would regain the lead again as former Baltimore kicker Matt Stover booted a 20-yard field goal.

With the win, the Colts would improve to 10–0, which includes a franchise-best nine-straight road win dating back to last season well as 18 straight wins overall.

Dallas Clark (1 reception for 3 yards and 1 TD) would break John Mackey's record for the most receptions by a Colts tight end with 321.

- Scoring

First quarter

- IND – Dallas Clark 3-yard pass from Peyton Manning, 11:24 (Matt Stover kick), Colts 7–0. Drive: 7 plays, 87 yards, 3:36.
- BAL – Billy Cundiff 46-yard field goal, 5:41, Colts 7–3. Drive: 15 plays, 51 yards, 6:15.
- BAL – Billy Cundiff 44-yard field goal, 4:06, Colts 7–6. Drive: 4 plays, 3 yards, 0:52.

Second quarter

- BAL – Billy Cundiff 38-yard field goal, 4:48, Ravens 9–7. Drive: 8 plays, 32 yards, 3:50.
- IND – Joseph Addai 5-yard run, 1:28 (Stover kick), Colts 14–9. Drive: 8 plays, 80 yards, 3:15.
- BAL – Billy Cundiff 36-yard field goal, 0:07, Colts 14–12. Drive: 9 plays, 54 yards, 1:21.

Fourth quarter

- BAL – Billy Cundiff 20-yard field goal, 10:16, Ravens 15–14. Drive: 15 plays, 65 yards, 8:05.
- IND – Matt Stover 25-yard field goal, 7:06, Colts 17–15. Drive: 9 plays, 66 yards, 2:58.

=== Week 12: at Houston Texans ===
	1	2	3	4	Total
Colts	0	7	7	21	35
Texans	14	6	0	7	27

at Reliant Stadium, Houston

- Game time: 1:00 PM EST
- Game weather: 75 °F (Mostly Cloudy)
- Game attendance: 70,990
- Referee: Al Riveron
- TV announcers (CBS): Greg Gumbel & Dan Dierdorf

Coming off their road win against the Ravens, the Colts flew to Reliant Stadium for an AFC South showdown with the Texans, their second meeting of the season. Houston dominated throughout the first half, scoring 20 points. The Colts took over from there, scoring 35 points, one of which was an interception returned 27 yards by Clint Session.

With the win, the Colts went to 11–0 and their winning streak improved to 19 games.

Also, with the win and Jacksonville's loss to San Francisco, the Colts clinched the AFC South division title, the first team to clinch a playoff berth this season.

- Scoring

First quarter

- HOU – Vonta Leach 7-yard pass from Matt Schaub, 8:31 (Kris Brown kick), Texans 7–0. Drive: 11 plays, 79 yards, 6:35.
- HOU – Chris Brown 5-yard run, 2:10 (Brown kick), Texans 14–0. Drive: 7 plays, 66 yards, 3:46.

Second quarter

- HOU – Kris Brown 35-yard field goal, 10:49. Texans 17–0. Drive: 7 plays, 12 yards, 2:41.
- IND – Pierre Garçon 9-yard pass from Peyton Manning, 5:46 (Matt Stover kick), Texans 17–7. Drive: 8 plays, 74 yards, 5:03.
- HOU – Kris Brown 33-yard field goal, 1:00. Texans 20–7. Drive: 11 plays, 65 yards, 4:46.

Third quarter

- IND – Reggie Wayne 4-yard pass from Peyton Manning, 11:20 (Stover kick), Texans 20–14. Drive: 9 plays, 80 yards, 3:40.

Fourth quarter

- IND – Dallas Clark 6-yard pass from Peyton Manning, 8:24 (Stover kick), Colts 21–20. Drive: 7 plays, 89 yards, 2:50.
- IND – Clint Session 27-yard interception return, 8:09 (Stover kick), Colts 28–20.
- IND – Chad Simpson 23-yard run, 2:52 (Stover kick), Colts 35–20. Drive: 4 plays, 37 yards, 1:43.
- HOU – Jacoby Jones 10-yard pass from Matt Schaub, 0:18 (Stover kick), Colts 35–27. Drive: 12 plays, 75 yards, 2:34.

=== Week 13: vs. Tennessee Titans ===
	1	2	3	4	Total
Titans	3	7	0	7	17
Colts	7	17	0	3	27

at Lucas Oil Stadium, Indianapolis

- Game time: 1:00 PM EST
- Game weather: None (Retractable Roof Closed)
- Game attendance: 66,321
- Referee: Ron Winter
- TV announcers (CBS): Ian Eagle & Rich Gannon

Coming off their come-from-behind road win against Houston, the Colts went home for a divisional duel with the 5–6 Tennessee Titans. Indianapolis started off the scoring with an eight-yard run from Joseph Addai. The Titans came back with a 20-yard field goal by Rob Bironas. Indianapolis struck again in the second quarter on another Joseph Addai run, then again on a four-yard pass to Austin Collie. The Titans would hit paydirt next with 0:20 left in the half, but Indianapolis would close out the first half with a 43-yard field goal by Matt Stover. After a scoreless third quarter, the Colts would strike next on another field goal, this time from 36 yards. The Titans scored again on a 17-yard pass to Bo Scaife. The Titans regained possession on an onside kick, but the Colts Defense kept the Titans from scoring again.

With the win, the Colts went to 12–0

Also with the win, the Colts tied the 2006–2008 Patriots record for most consecutive regular season wins with 21.

- Scoring

First quarter

- IND – Joseph Addai 8-yard run, 13:02 (Matt Stover kick), Colts 7–0. Drive: 5 plays, 75 yards, 1:58.
- TEN – Rob Bironas 20-yard field goal, 6:34. Colts 7–3. Drive: 13 plays, 69 yards, 6:28.

Second quarter

- IND – Joseph Addai 1-yard run, 11:42 (Stover kick), Colts 14–3. Drive: 10 plays, 77 yards, 3:56.
- IND – Austin Collie 4-yard pass from Peyton Manning, 1:55 (Stover kick), Colts 21–3. Drive: 9 plays, 42 yards, 3:48.
- TEN – Kenny Britt 6-yard pass from Vince Young, 0:20 (Bironas kick), Colts 21–10. Drive: 8 plays, 66 yards, 1:35.
- IND – Matt Stover 43-yard field goal, 0:00, Colts 24–10. Drive: 4 plays, 38 yards, 0:20.

Third quarter

- No scoring play

Fourth quarter

- IND – Matt Stover 36-yard field goal, 3:14, Colts 27–10. Drive: 15 plays, 69 yards, 7:23.
- TEN – Bo Scaife 17-yard pass from Vince Young, 1:23 (Bironas kick), Colts 27–17. Drive: 6 plays, 46 yards, 1:51.

=== Week 14: vs. Denver Broncos ===
	1	2	3	4	Total
Broncos	0	7	0	9	16
Colts	14	7	0	7	28

at Lucas Oil Stadium, Indianapolis

- Game time: 1:00 PM EST
- Game weather: None (retractable roof closed)
- Game attendance: 67,248
- Referee: Bill Leavy
- TV announcers (CBS): Dick Enberg & Dan Fouts

The Colts improved their season record to 13–0 and broke the 2006–2008 Patriots record for most consecutive regular season wins with 22.

- Scoring

First quarter

- IND – Austin Collie 5-yard pass from Peyton Manning, 9:06 (Matt Stover kick), Colts 7–0. Drive: 13 plays, 80 yards, 5:54.
- IND – Dallas Clark 10-yard pass from Peyton Manning, 5:04 (Stover kick), Colts 14–0. Drive: 7 plays, 56 yards, 2:24.

Second quarter

- IND – Dallas Clark 1-yard pass from Peyton Manning, 7:58 (Stover kick), Colts 21–0. Drive: 11 plays, 71 yards, 5:03.
- DEN – Brandon Marshall 5-yard pass from Kyle Orton, 2:23 (Matt Prater kick), Colts 21–7. Drive: 12 plays, 80 yards, 5:35.

Third quarter

- No scoring play

Fourth quarter

- DEN – Matt Prater 28-yard field goal, 14:50, Colts 21–10. Drive: 5 plays, 14 yards, 1:02.
- DEN – Brandon Marshall 5-yard pass from Kyle Orton, 9:44 (two-point conversion failed), Colts 21–16. Drive: 11 plays, 68 yards, 4:44.
- IND – Dallas Clark 1-yard pass from Peyton Manning, 2:25 (Stover kick), Colts 28–16. Drive: 14 plays, 80 yards, 7:19.

=== Week 15: at Jacksonville Jaguars ===
	1	2	3	4	Total
Colts	0	21	7	7	35
Jaguars	3	14	14	0	31

at Jacksonville Municipal Stadium, Jacksonville, Florida

- Game time: 8:20 PM EST
- Game weather: 61 °F (Mostly cloudy)
- Game attendance: 63,753
- Referee: Walt Anderson
- TV announcers (NFLN): Bob Papa & Matt Millen
- Scoring

First quarter

- JAC – Josh Scobee 50-yard field goal, 7:32, Jaguars 3–0. Drive: 13 plays, 41 yards, 7:33.

Second quarter

- IND – Dallas Clark 6-yard pass from Peyton Manning, 14:19 (Matt Stover kick), Colts 7–3. Drive: 14 plays, 80 yards, 8:14.
- JAC – Maurice Jones-Drew 9-yard pass from David Garrard, 8:34 (Scobee kick), Jaguars 10–7. Drive: 11 plays, 61 yards, 5:48.
- IND – Chad Simpson 93-yard kickoff return, 8:25 (Stover kick), Colts 14–10.
- JAC – Maurice Jones-Drew 3-yard run, 3:05 (Scobee kick), Jaguars 17–14. Drive: 10 plays, 71 yards, 5:14.
- IND – Austin Collie 23-yard pass from Peyton Manning, 0:40 (Stover kick), Colts 21–17. Drive: 6 plays, 68 yards, 2:23.

Third quarter

- JAC – Mike Sims-Walker 16-yard pass from David Garrard, 8:37 (Scobee kick), Jaguars 24–21. Drive: 9 plays, 39 yards, 3:45.
- IND – Dallas Clark 27-yard pass from Peyton Manning, 5:37 (Stover kick), Colts 28–24. Drive: 7 plays, 80 yards, 3:04.
- JAC – Mike Thomas 13-yard pass from David Garrard, 0:53 (Scobee kick), Jaguars 28–31. Drive: 9 plays, 46 yards, 4:41.

Fourth quarter

- IND – Reggie Wayne 65-yard pass from Peyton Manning, 5:23 (Stover kick), Colts 35–31. Drive: 1 play, 65 yards, 8:37.

With the win the Colts improved to 14–0 and their winning streak improved to 23. Also, with the Saints' loss the Colts became the NFL's only undefeated team.

The Colts also became the first team since the 2007 Patriots to start a season at 14–0.

=== Week 16: vs. New York Jets ===
	1	2	3	4	Total
Jets	0	3	15	11	29
Colts	6	3	6	0	15

at Lucas Oil Stadium, Indianapolis

- Game time: 4:15 PM EST
- Game weather: None (retractable roof closed)
- Game attendance:
- Referee: Terry McAulay
- TV announcers (CBS): Greg Gumbel and Dan Dierdorf

With this loss, the Colts ended their perfect season run and had a record of 14–1 heading into the last week of the regular season. The Colts also ended their 23–game regular season winning streak.

- Scoring

First quarter

- IND – Joseph Addai 21-yard run, 6:55 (Adam Vinatieri kick blocked), Colts 6–0. Drive: 8 plays, 54 yards, 4:20.

Second quarter

- IND – Adam Vinatieri 22-yard field goal, 11:46. Colts 9–0. Drive: 10 plays, 86 yards, 4:45.
- NYJ – Jay Feely 35-yard field goal, 1:44. Colts 9–3. Drive: 11 plays, 63 yards, 4:38.

Third quarter

- NYJ – Brad Smith 106-yard kickoff return, 0:12 (Feely kick), Jets 10–9.
- IND – Donald Brown 1-yard run, 10:13 (two-point conversion failed), Colts 15–10. Drive: 9 plays, 81 yards, 4:35.
- NYJ – Marques Douglas 1-yard fumble return, 1:29 (Dustin Keller two-point conversion), Jets 18–15.

Fourth quarter

- NYJ – Jay Feely 43-yard field goal, 13:34. Jets 21–15. Drive: 6 plays, 20 yards, 2:03
- NYJ – Thomas Jones 1-yard run, 5:38 (Braylon Edwards two-point conversion), Jets 29–15. Drive: 11 plays, 79 yards, 6:14

=== Week 17: at Buffalo Bills ===
Week 17: Indianapolis Colts at Buffalo Bills – Game summary

- Game time: 1:00 PM EST
- Game weather: 14 °F (heavy snow)
- TV announcers (CBS): Bill Macatee and Steve Beuerlein
- Game attendance: Unknown at Ralph Wilson Stadium, Orchard Park, New York
- Referee: Don Carey

First quarter

- BUF – (9:30) Ryan Fitzpatrick pass short middle to Fred Jackson for 11 yards, TOUCHDOWN. Extra point converted. Drive: 6 plays, 41 yards, in 2:58. (Bills 7–0)
- IND – (3:56) Mike Hart left guard for 1 yard, TOUCHDOWN. Extra point converted. Drive: 12 plays, 72 yards, in 5:33. (Tied 7–7)

Second quarter

- BUF – (5:03) Ryan Fitzpatrick pass deep right to Lee Evans for 21 yards, TOUCHDOWN. Extra point converted. Drive: 5 plays, 51 yards, in 2:46. (Bills 14–7)
- BUF – (2:35) Ryan Fitzpatrick pass deep right to Terrell Owens for 41 yards, TOUCHDOWN. Extra point converted. Drive: 2 plays, 50 yards, in 0:48. (Bills 21–7)
- BUF – (0:18) Rian Lindell 31-yard field goal is GOOD. Drive: 10 plays, 34 yards, in 2:04. (Bills 24–7)

Third quarter

- BUF – (7:36) Rian Lindell 33-yard field goal is GOOD. Drive: 8 plays, 44 yards, in 4:35. (Bills 27–7)
- BUF – (0:14) Rian Lindell 36-yard field goal is GOOD. Drive: 10 plays, 62 yards, in 5:20. (Bills 30–7)

Fourth quarter

- No scoring play

	1	2	3	4	Total
Colts	7	0	0	0	7
Bills	7	17	6	0	30

Top passers

- IND – Peyton Manning – 14/18, 95 yards, 0 TD, 1 INT
- BUF – Ryan Fitzpatrick – 14/23, 134 yards, 3 TD, 0 INT

Top rushers

- IND – Mike Hart – 10 carries, 28 yards, 1 TD
- BUF – Fred Jackson – 31 carries, 205 yards, 0 TD

Top receivers

- IND – Dallas Clark – 7 receptions, 52 yards, 0 TD
- BUF – Lee Evans – 4 receptions, 49 yards, 1 TD

Top tacklers

- IND – Kelvin Hayden (7)
- BUF – Paul Posluszny (9.5)

With the loss, the Colts finished the season with a league-best 14–2.

== Postseason ==
Playoff round	Date	Opponent (Seed)	Result	Record	Venue	Recap
Wild Card	First-round bye					
Divisional	January 16	Baltimore Ravens (6)	W 20–3	1–0	Lucas Oil Stadium	Recap
AFC Championship	January 24	New York Jets (5)	W 30–17	2–0	Lucas Oil Stadium	Recap
Super Bowl XLIV	February 7	vs. New Orleans Saints (N1)	L 17–31	2–1	Sun Life Stadium	Recap

=== AFC Divisional vs. Baltimore Ravens ===
AFC Divisional: Baltimore Ravens at Indianapolis Colts – Game summary

- Game time: 8:15 PM EST
- Game weather: Played with roof closed, retractable roof stadium
- TV announcers (CBS): Greg Gumbel and Dan Dierdorf
- Game attendance: 67,535 at Lucas Oil Stadium, Indianapolis, Indiana
- Referee: Carl Cheffers

First quarter

- IND – (10:48) Matt Stover 44-yard field goal is GOOD. Drive: 10 plays, 54 yards, in 4:16. (Colts 3–0)
- BAL – (3:00) Billy Cundiff 25-yard field goal is GOOD. Drive: 15 plays, 87 yards, in 7:47. (Tied 3–3)

Second quarter

- IND – (2:06) Peyton Manning pass short left to Austin Collie for 10 yards, TOUCHDOWN. Extra point converted. Drive: 14 plays, 75 yards, in 8:00. (Colts 10–3)
- IND – (0:07) Peyton Manning pass short left to Reggie Wayne for 3 yards, TOUCHDOWN. Extra point converted. Drive: 8 plays, 64 yards, in 1:23. (Colts 17–3)

Third quarter

- No scoring play

Fourth quarter

- IND – (13:30) Matt Stover 33-yard field goal is GOOD. Drive: 14 plays, 56 yards, in 7:21. (Colts 20–3)

	1	2	3	4	Total
Ravens	3	0	0	0	3
Colts	3	14	0	3	20

Top passers

- BAL – Joe Flacco – 20/35, 189 yards, 0 TD, 2 INT
- IND – Peyton Manning – 30/44, 246 yards, 2 TD, 1 INT

Top rushers

- BAL – Ray Rice – 13 carries, 67 yards, 0 TD
- IND – Joseph Addai – 11 carries, 23 yards, 0 TD

Top receivers

- BAL – Derrick Mason – 4 receptions, 64 yards, 0 TD
- IND – Reggie Wayne – 8 receptions, 63 yards, 1 TD

Top tacklers

- BAL – Dannell Ellerbe (10)
- IND – Kelvin Hayden and Daniel Muir (6)

Entering the postseason as the AFC's #1 seed, the Colts began their playoff run at home in the AFC Divisional Round against the #6 Baltimore Ravens. Indianapolis would open the first quarter with a 44-yard field goal from former Ravens kicker Matt Stover. Baltimore would reply with a 25-yard field goal from kicker Billy Cundiff. In the second quarter, the Colts would deliver a big punch as quarterback Peyton Manning hooked up with rookie wide receiver Austin Collie on a 10-yard touchdown pass and then found wide receiver Reggie Wayne on a three-yard touchdown pass. After a scoreless third quarter, Indianapolis would add onto their lead with Stover's 33-yard field goal. From there, the defense kept forcing turnovers to prevail. Manning ended up yelling at Donald Brown during a play at the beginning of the fourth quarter, which became a meme.

=== AFC Championship vs. New York Jets ===
AFC Championship: New York Jets at Indianapolis Colts – Game summary

- Game time: 3:00 PM EST
- Game weather: Played with roof closed, retractable roof stadium
- TV announcers (CBS): Jim Nantz and Phil Simms
- Game attendance: 67,650 at Lucas Oil Stadium, Indianapolis, Indiana
- Referee: Tony Corrente

First quarter

- No scoring play

Second quarter

- IND – (14:56) Matt Stover 25-yard field goal is GOOD. Drive: 8 plays, 82 yards, in 3:41. (Colts 3–0)
- NYJ – (14:45) Mark Sanchez pass deep left to Braylon Edwards for 80 yards, TOUCHDOWN. Extra point converted. Drive: 1 play, 80 yards, in 0:11. (Jets 7–3)
- IND – (8:44) Matt Stover 19-yard field goal is GOOD. Drive: 12 plays, 79 yards, in 6:01. (Jets 7–6)
- NYJ – (4:59) Mark Sanchez pass short right to Dustin Keller for 9 yards, TOUCHDOWN. Extra point converted. Drive: 7 plays, 77 yards, in 3:51. (Jets 14–6)
- NYJ – (2:16) Jay Feely 48-yard field goal is GOOD. Drive: 4 plays, –1 yards, in 1:29. (Jets 17–6)
- IND – (1:19) Peyton Manning pass deep middle to Austin Collie for 16 yards, TOUCHDOWN. Extra point converted. Drive: 4 plays, 80 yards, in 0:58. (Jets 17–13)

Third quarter

- IND – (8:08) Peyton Manning pass short right to Pierre Garçon for 4 yards, TOUCHDOWN. Extra point converted. Drive: 8 plays, 57 yards, in 3:31. (Colts 20–17)

Fourth quarter

- IND – (8:57) Peyton Manning pass short middle to Dallas Clark for 15 yards, TOUCHDOWN. Extra point converted. Drive: 7 plays, 80 yards, in 3:33. (Colts 27–17)
- IND – (2:33) Matt Stover 21-yard field goal is GOOD. Drive: 12 plays, 71 yards, 5:33. (Colts 30–17)

	1	2	3	4	Total
Jets	0	17	0	0	17
Colts	0	13	7	10	30

Top passers

- NYJ – Mark Sanchez – 17/30, 257 yards, 2 TD, 1 INT
- IND – Peyton Manning – 26/39, 377 yards, 3 TD, 0 INT

Top rushers

- NYJ – Thomas Jones – 16 carries, 42 yards, 0 TD
- IND – Joseph Addai – 16 carries, 80 yards, 0 TD

Top receivers

- NYJ – Jerricho Cotchery – 5 receptions, 102 yards, 0 TD
- IND – Pierre Garçon – 11 receptions, 151 yards, 1 TD

Top tacklers

- NYJ – David Harris (11)
- IND – Gary Brackett (7)

Coming off their divisional win over the Ravens, the Colts would stay at home for the AFC Championship Game against the #5 New York Jets. After a scoreless first quarter, Indianapolis would begin the second quarter with a 25-yard field goal from kicker Matt Stover. However, the Jets responded with quarterback Mark Sanchez completing an 80-yard touchdown pass to wide receiver Braylon Edwards. The Colts would come right back with Stover's 19-yard field goal, but New York answered with Sanchez's nine-yard touchdown pass to tight end Dustin Keller, followed by kicker Jay Feely making a 48-yard field goal. Fortunately, Indianapolis would strike back as quarterback Peyton Manning found rookie wide receiver Austin Collie on a 16-yard touchdown pass.

The Colts would take the lead in the third quarter with Manning hooking up with wide receiver Pierre Garçon on a four-yard touchdown pass. Indianapolis would add onto their lead in the fourth quarter as Manning hooked up with tight end Dallas Clark on a 15-yard touchdown pass, followed by Stover's 21-yard field goal.

With the win, not only did the Colts improve their overall record to 16–2, but they would advance to their second Super Bowl in four years.

The game served as Peyton Manning's last playoff win as a Colt and the team's last playoff win until their comeback win at home against the Kansas City Chiefs in the Wildcard Round of the 2013 playoffs. This would serve as the team's last appearance in the AFC Championship game until the 2014 playoffs. Manning would win his next playoff game in the Divisional Round of the 2013 playoffs as a member of the Broncos.

=== Super Bowl XLIV vs. New Orleans Saints ===
Super Bowl XLIV: New Orleans Saints vs. Indianapolis Colts – Game summary

- Game time: 6:30 PM EST
- Game weather: 61 °F (partly cloudy)
- TV announcers (CBS): Jim Nantz, Phil Simms, Steve Tasker, and Solomon Wilcots
- Game attendance: at Sun Life Stadium, Miami Gardens, Florida
- Referee: Scott Green

First quarter

- IND – (7:29) Matt Stover 38-yard field goal is GOOD. Drive: 11 plays, 53 yards, in 5:53. (Colts 3–0)
- IND – (0:36) Peyton Manning pass deep right to Pierre Garçon for 19 yards, TOUCHDOWN. Extra point converted. Drive: 11 plays, 96 yards, in 4:36. (Colts 10–0)

Second quarter

- NO – (9:34) Garrett Hartley 46-yard field goal is GOOD. Drive: 11 plays, 60 yards, in 6:02. (Colts 10–3)
- NO – (0:00) Garrett Hartley 44-yard field goal is GOOD. Drive: 5 plays, 26 yards, in 0:35. (Colts 10–6)

Third quarter

- NO – (11:41) Drew Brees pass short right to Pierre Thomas for 16 yards, TOUCHDOWN. Extra point converted. Drive: 6 plays, 58 yards, in 3:19. (Saints 13–10)
- IND – (6:15) Joseph Addai to right tackle for 4 yards, TOUCHDOWN. Extra point converted. Drive: 10 plays, 76 yards, in 5:26. (Colts 17–13)
- NO – (2:01) Garrett Hartley 47-yard field goal is GOOD. Drive: 8 plays, 37 yards, in 4:14. (Colts 17–16)

Fourth quarter

- NO – (5:42) Drew Brees pass short right to Jeremy Shockey for 2 yards, TOUCHDOWN. Two-point conversion to Lance Moore successful. Drive: 9 plays, 59 yards, in 4:57. (Saints 24–17)
- NO – (3:12) Peyton Manning pass intended for Reggie Wayne INTERCEPTED by Tracy Porter for 74 yards, TOUCHDOWN. Extra point converted. (Saints 31–17)

	1	2	3	4	Total
Saints	0	6	10	15	31
Colts	10	0	7	0	17

Top passers

- NO – Drew Brees – 32/39, 288 yards, 2 TD, 0 INT
- IND – Peyton Manning – 31/45, 333 yards, 1 TD, 1 INT

Top rushers

- NO – Pierre Thomas – 9 carries, 30 yards, 0 TD
- IND – Joseph Addai – 13 carries, 77 yards, 1 TD

Top receivers

- NO – Marques Colston – 7 receptions, 83 yards, 0 TD
- IND – Dallas Clark – 7 receptions, 86 yards, 0 TD

Top tacklers

- NO – Jonathan Vilma (7)
- IND – Gary Brackett (12.5)

After the coin toss, the Saints wanted the ball first; however, this didn't help their first drive. The Colts drove the ball down the field with an attempt to score the first touchdown but was denied and forced Matt Stover to kick a 38-yard goal. But the Colts were not finished: on their next possession, Pierre Garçon caught a 19-yard TD pass from Peyton Manning, and the Colts led 10–0 after fifteen minutes. In the second quarter, the Saints were forced to look upon Garrett Hartley for two field goals – a 46 yarder and a 44 yarder respectively – and the deficit was reduced to four points by halftime.

Kicking off the second half, the Saints caught Indy by surprise with the "Ambush" play (an onside kick in kickoff formation), which the Saints recovered, shifting the momentum to them. Pierre Thomas caught a 16-yard screen pass from Drew Brees and NO had their first lead of the game, 13–10 after the extra point. The Colts would not be denied from scoring again with the rushing attack of Joseph Addai, capping off the scoring drive with a 4-yard run. From here, however, the Colts would be denied. The Saints still stood by Hartley to keep the game close with a 47-yard field goal, taking the score to 17–16. In the fourth quarter, Jeremy Shockey caught a two-yard touchdown pass from Drew Brees with Lance Moore catching a two-point conversion and the Saints led 24–17. In the end, it was the defense that came through when Tracy Porter intercepted and returned 74 yards for a touchdown to seal the win and the first Super Bowl title for the New Orleans Saints in their 44-year existence.

== Awards and honors ==
Award	Player	Position
AP NFL Most Valuable Player	Peyton Manning	Quarterback
AP NFL All-Pro (first team)	Peyton Manning	Quarterback
AP NFL All-Pro (first team)	Dallas Clark	Tight end
AP NFL All-Pro (first team)	Dwight Freeney	Defensive end
AP NFL All-Pro (second team)	Reggie Wayne	Wide receiver
Pro Bowl	Peyton Manning	Quarterback
Pro Bowl	Reggie Wayne	Wide receiver
Pro Bowl	Dallas Clark	Tight end
Pro Bowl	Jeff Saturday	Center
Pro Bowl	Dwight Freeney	Defensive end
Pro Bowl	Robert Mathis	Defensive end
Pro Bowl	Antoine Bethea	Safety
AFC Player of the Week (week 9)	Dallas Clark	Tight end
AFC Player of the Week (week 10)	Peyton Manning	Quarterback
AFC Offensive Player of the Month (September 2009)	Peyton Manning	Quarterback
AFC Defensive Player of the Month (December 2009)	Robert Mathis	Defensive end

- Note: Since the 2010 Pro Bowl was held before Super Bowl XLIV, the seven players selected did not participate.

== Scores by quarter ==
	1	2	3	4	Total
Opponents	59	85	31	73	248
Colts	83	144	52	115	394

== Criticism over resting players ==
In week 16, the Colts faced off against the New York Jets with an undefeated record of 14–0, having already clinched home–field advantage throughout the playoffs. In the third quarter with a 15–10 lead, head coach Jim Caldwell, allegedly on orders by general manager Bill Polian, benched Peyton Manning for Curtis Painter. The Jets forced Painter to fumble, then recovered it for a touchdown and turned into an 18–15 lead. Indianapolis never recovered, never put Manning into the game, and lost 29–15, ending their chance at an undefeated season. This decision was heavily criticized by media outlets and fans alike. Manning's reaction was, "Until any player in here is the head coach, you follow orders and you follow them with all of your heart." On fans' reaction to the game, Jeff Saturday stated, "I don't blame them a bit, man.. I probably would have booed, too. I don't blame them. They pay to come see us win games, and we didn't get it done."
