= 2009 Detroit Lions season =

NFL team season

- Owner: William Clay Ford Sr.
- General manager: Martin Mayhew
- Head coach: Jim Schwartz
- Home stadium: Ford Field

Results
- Record: 2–14
- Division place: 4th NFC North
- Playoffs: Did not qualify
- Pro Bowlers: None

The 2009 Detroit Lions season was the franchise's 80th season overall in the National Football League (NFL). It was the first season with the Lions for new head coach Jim Schwartz, and most of his new coaching staff. The Lions also introduced slightly new uniforms and logos. The Lions improved upon their 0–16 record from the previous season. However, they missed the playoffs for the 10th straight season, which meant the Lions were one of two franchises, not including the Houston Texans (an expansion team that began play in 2002), to not qualify for the playoffs in the 2000s, with the other team being the Buffalo Bills.

This season combined with the Lions' 0–16 record the previous year was the worst two season record (2–30) since the merger until the Cleveland Browns had a 1–15 record in 2016, followed by an 0–16 record in 2017 (1–31).

== Offseason ==
=== Repercussions of 2008 season ===
On December 29, 2008, the day after the last game of the 0–16 2008 season, Detroit Lions owner William Clay Ford Sr. announced head coach Rod Marinelli had been fired. His record with the Lions was 10–38 in three seasons.

He also announced:

- The promotion of Tom Lewand to team president.
- The promotion of Martin Mayhew to general manager.
- The following assistant coaches were not retained: Joe Barry (defensive coordinator), Mike Barry (assistant offensive line) and Jimmy Lake (secondary).
- Joe Cullen (defensive line)'s contract was not renewed.
- The team also announced that Jim Colletto had been reassigned to offensive line coach. He ultimately left football altogether and would be replaced by George Yarno as offensive line coach.
- Additionally, Dave Boller (assistant director of pro personnel) was not retained.

== New uniform and logo designs ==
The Lions officially unveiled a somewhat new logo design and uniforms on April 20, 2009, at a public press conference at a local Dunham's Sports store. The Lion on the helmet now has a flowing mane and fangs, and the font of "Lions" is more modern and stylish.

The Lions' throwback uniforms that were used in 2008 became their official third uniform, however they were not used in 2009. The black jerseys used from 2005 to 2007 were officially discontinued on February 9, 2009, according to Lions team president Tom Lewand.

== Personnel ==
=== Key roster losses and trades ===
- On February 28, 2009, the Lions traded quarterback Jon Kitna, who sat out most of the 2008 season with a back injury, to the Dallas Cowboys for cornerback Anthony Henry.
- On March 14, 2009, the Lions traded defensive tackle Cory Redding and a fifth round draft pick to the Seattle Seahawks for linebacker Julian Peterson.

=== Key free agent signings ===
- On May 7, 2009, the Lions signed Detroit native and former Michigan Wolverine linebacker Larry Foote. He played on the Super Bowl Champion Pittsburgh Steelers in 2008.

=== Corey Smith disappearance ===
On March 1, 2009, it was reported that free agent defensive end Corey Smith (who played for the Lions from 2006 to 2008) boarded a fishing boat off the Gulf Coast of Florida with former teammate Marquis Cooper (most recently of the Oakland Raiders) and former University of South Florida players Nick Schuyler and William Blakely on February 28. Smith and Cooper played together on the Tampa Bay Buccaneers in 2004. They did not return as expected and the men and their boat were searched for by the U.S. Coast Guard for three days. The National Weather Service said waves were about two to four feet Saturday morning and increased to between three and five feet in the afternoon. Late Saturday night, a small craft advisory was issued, when winds were around twenty knots and waves were up to seven feet or more. On March 2, at approximately 1:30 pm, Coast Guard Petty Official James Harless reported that Schuyler had been found alive "clinging to an overturned vessel". He was later diagnosed with hypothermia and dehydration. On March 3, the Coast Guard called off the search. Later that day, the Lions released this statement:

Today’s news is a sobering reminder about how truly precious and fragile life can be. We will continue to pray for a miracle, though we fully understand and respect the decision of the Coast Guard.

We were thrilled yesterday with the news of Nick’s rescue, and it gave all of us hope that Corey, Will and Marquis would also be found alive.

While we still have that hope, we have begun to cope with the grim reality of this sad and tragic situation.

We cannot adequately express our heartfelt appreciation to the Coast Guard and all the Florida authorities involved in the rescue mission. Their heroic efforts saved at least one life, and we know they did everything possible for Corey, Will and Marquis.

We also want to thank everyone across the country for their expressions of support. We ask that you join us as we continue to pray for Corey, Will, Marquis and their families.

— Detroit Lions Press Release, March 3, 2009

A private search led by the families of the still missing men began on March 4.

The Lions also announced that Smith's jersey number, 93, would not be issued for the 2009 season. The Lions also wore a 93 on the back of their helmets.

=== 2009 NFL draft ===
With their league worst record in 2008, the Lions secured the No. 1 overall pick in the 2009 NFL Draft. Detroit also had the No. 20 overall pick in the first round, which they received from the Dallas Cowboys as part of the Roy Williams trade in 2008. The trade also gave them additional picks in the 3rd and 6th rounds.

The Lions traded its 2009 fourth-round selection (101st overall) and its 2008 third-round selection (111th overall, which was traded to Cleveland) to Dallas for its 2008 third-round selection (92nd overall, used to select Cliff Avril).

The Lions selected University of Georgia quarterback Matthew Stafford for the No. 1 overall pick. The six-year contract reportedly contained $41.7 million in guaranteed money, which was the most guaranteed to any player in NFL history up to that point, and carried a total value of up to $78 million.

2009 Detroit Lions draft
Round	Pick	Player	Position	College	Notes
1	1	Matthew Stafford *	Quarterback	Georgia	
1	20	Brandon Pettigrew	Tight end	Oklahoma State	from Dallas^{[a]}
2	33	Louis Delmas	Safety	Western Michigan	
3	76	DeAndre Levy	Outside linebacker	Wisconsin	from New Orleans via New York Jets^{[b]}
3	82	Derrick Williams	Wide receiver	Penn State	from Dallas^{[a]}
4	115	Sammie Lee Hill	Defensive tackle	Stillman	from Washington via New York Jets^{[c]}
6	192	Aaron Brown	Running back	Texas Christian	from Dallas^{[a]}
7	228	Lydon Murtha	Offensive tackle	Nebraska	from New York Jets^{[d]}
7	235	Zack Follett	Outside linebacker	California	from Atlanta via Denver^{[e]}
7	255	Dan Gronkowski	Tight end	Maryland	
Made roster * Made at least one Pro Bowl during career

^a from Dallas

^b from New Orleans via New York Jets

^c from Washington via New York Jets

^d from New York Jets

^e from Atlanta via Denver

==== Undrafted free agents ====
Name	Position	College
Demir Boldin	Wide receiver	Wake Forest
Dan Gerberry	Center	Ball State
John Gill	Defensive tackle	Northwestern
Kenneth Harris	Wide receiver	Georgia
Ryan Kess	Defensive end	St. Cloud State
Antone Smith	Running back	Florida State
Spenser Smith	Linebacker	Eastern Michigan
Swayze Walters	Kicker	UAB

== Coaching staff ==
- On January 15, 2009, the Lions hired Jim Schwartz as head coach. He spent ten seasons with the Tennessee Titans, eight of them as defensive coordinator, helping them compile a 13–3 record and first place in the AFC South in 2008, before being eliminated in the AFC Divisional playoffs by the Baltimore Ravens.
- On January 21, 2009, the Lions hired veteran coach and defensive coordinator Gunther Cunningham as defensive coordinator and assistant head coach. Cunningham worked with Schwartz on the Titans from 2001 to 2003, and has several years of coaching and defensive coordinating experience with the Kansas City Chiefs and Oakland Raiders.
- On January 23, 2009, the Lions hired Scott Linehan as the offensive coordinator. Linehan held the head coaching position of the St. Louis Rams from 2006 to 2008 but was fired after losing the first four games of the 2008 season. This is the second time in three years the Lions have turned to a former Rams coach. He also served as the offensive coordinator for the Miami Dolphins in 2005 and the Minnesota Vikings for three seasons (2002–2004).

Detroit Lions 2009 staff
Front office: Owner/chairman – William Clay Ford Sr.; Vice chairman – William Clay Ford Jr.; President – Tom Lewand; General manager – Martin Mayhew; Senior personnel executive – James "Shack" Harris; Vice president of football operations – Cedric Saunders; Vice president of pro personnel – Sheldon White; Director of college scouting – Scott McEwen; Assistant director of college scouting – Lance Newmark; Assistant director of pro personnel – Miller McCalmon; Assistant director of pro personnel – Charlie Sanders; Head coaches: Head coach – Jim Schwartz; Assistant head coach/defensive coordinator – Gunther Cunningham; Offensive coaches: Offensive coordinator – Scott Linehan; Quarterbacks – Jeff Horton; Running backs – Sam Gash; Wide receivers – Shawn Jefferson; Tight ends – Tim Lappano; Offensive line – George Yarno; Offensive quality control – Todd Downing	Defensive coaches: Defensive line – Bob Karmelowicz; Assistant defensive line – Kris Kocurek; Linebackers – Matt Burke; Secondary – Tim Walton; Assistant secondary – Daron Roberts; Defensive assistant – Don Clemons; Special teams coaches: Special teams coordinator – Stan Kwan; Assistant special teams – Bradford Banta; Strength and conditioning: Coordinator of physical development – Jason Arapoff; Strength and conditioning – Malcolm Blacken

=== Final roster ===
2009 Detroit Lions roster
Quarterbacks (QB): 11 Daunte Culpepper; 14 Patrick Ramsey; 5 Drew Stanton; Running backs (RB): 21 Aaron Brown KR; 45 Jerome Felton FB; 28 Maurice Morris; 35 Cedric Peerman; Wide receivers (WR): 18 Eric Fowler; 80 Bryant Johnson; 81 Calvin Johnson; 86 Dennis Northcutt PR; 12 Derrick Williams KR; Tight ends (TE): 89 Will Heller; 83 Michael Matthews; 85 Jake Nordin	Offensive linemen (OL): 76 Jeff Backus T; 77 Gosder Cherilus T; 65 Dylan Gandy C/G; 64 Dan Gerberry C; 78 Corey Hilliard T; 68 Jon Jansen G/T; 70 Daniel Loper G; 51 Dominic Raiola C; 63 Manny Ramirez G; 74 Roy Schuening G; Defensive linemen (DL): 92 Cliff Avril DE; 60 Joe Cohen DT; 98 Landon Cohen DT; 96 Andre Fluellen DE/DT; 79 Sammie Lee Hill DT; 97 Jason Hunter DE; 90 Grady Jackson DT; 75 Turk McBride DE; 99 Dewayne White DE	Linebackers (LB): 46 Vinny Ciurciu MLB; 57 Jordon Dizon OLB; 49 Zack Follett OLB; 55 Larry Foote MLB; 54 DeAndre Levy MLB/OLB; 59 Julian Peterson OLB; 50 Ernie Sims OLB; Defensive backs (DB): 31 Phillip Buchanon CB; 26 Louis Delmas FS; 32 Anthony Henry CB; 23 Kevin Hobbs CB; 41 Will James CB; 24 Kalvin Pearson FS; 39 DeAngelo Smith CB/S; 25 Marvin White SS; 36 Brian Witherspoon CB; Special teams (ST): 4 Jason Hanson K; 2 Nick Harris P; 48 Don Muhlbach LS	Practice squad: 61 Matthias Askew DT (IR); 10 Michael Ray Garvin WR; 47 Dan Gronkowski TE; 19 Kole Heckendorf WR; 72 Robert Henderson DE; 43 Paul Pratt CB; 73 Kurt Quarterman G/T; 62 Terrance Taylor DT; 33 Jahi Word-Daniels S; 37 Jonathon Hall CB; Reserve: 94 Copeland Bryan DE (IR); 27 Daniel Bullocks S (IR); 71 Damion Cook G/T (IR); 95 Jared DeVries DE (IR); 38 DeMarcus Faggins CB (IR); 82 Casey FitzSimmons TE (IR); 17 Adam Jennings WR (IR); 29 Eric King CB (IR/Susp.); 40 Marquand Manuel S (IR); 66 Stephen Peterman G (IR); 84 Brandon Pettigrew TE (IR); 30 Ko Simpson S (IR); 34 Kevin Smith RB (IR); 53 Cody Spencer LB (IR); 9 Matthew Stafford QB (IR); 42 Jack Williams CB (IR); Rookies in italics 53 active, 17 reserve, 8 practice squad

== Schedule ==
=== Preseason ===
Week	Date	Opponent	Result	Record	Game site	NFL.com recap
1	August 15	Atlanta Falcons	W 27–26	1–0	Ford Field	Recap
2	August 22	at Cleveland Browns	L 10–27	1–1	Cleveland Browns Stadium	Recap
3	August 29	Indianapolis Colts	W 18–17	2–1	Ford Field	Recap
4	September 3	at Buffalo Bills	W 17–6	3–1	Ralph Wilson Stadium	Recap

=== Regular season ===
Week	Date	Opponent	Result	Record	Game site	NFL.com recap
1	September 13	at New Orleans Saints	L 27–45	0–1	Louisiana Superdome	Recap
2	September 20	Minnesota Vikings	L 13–27	0–2	Ford Field	Recap
3	September 27	Washington Redskins	W 19–14	1–2	Ford Field	Recap
4	October 4	at Chicago Bears	L 24–48	1–3	Soldier Field	Recap
5	October 11	Pittsburgh Steelers	L 20–28	1–4	Ford Field	Recap
6	October 18	at Green Bay Packers	L 0–26	1–5	Lambeau Field	Recap
7	Bye					
8	November 1	St. Louis Rams	L 10–17	1–6	Ford Field	Recap
9	November 8	at Seattle Seahawks	L 20–32	1–7	Qwest Field	Recap
10	November 15	at Minnesota Vikings	L 10–27	1–8	Mall of America Field	Recap
11	November 22	Cleveland Browns	W 38–37	2–8	Ford Field	Recap
12	November 26	Green Bay Packers	L 12–34	2–9	Ford Field	Recap
13	December 6	at Cincinnati Bengals	L 13–23	2–10	Paul Brown Stadium	Recap
14	December 13	at Baltimore Ravens	L 3–48	2–11	M&T Bank Stadium	Recap
15	December 20	Arizona Cardinals	L 24–31	2–12	Ford Field	Recap
16	December 27	at San Francisco 49ers	L 6–20	2–13	Candlestick Park	Recap
17	January 3	Chicago Bears	L 23–37	2–14	Ford Field	Recap

== Standings ==
NFC North
	W	L	T	PCT	DIV	CONF	PF	PA	STK
^{(2)} Minnesota Vikings	12	4	0	.750	5–1	9–3	470	312	W1
^{(5)} Green Bay Packers	11	5	0	.688	4–2	9–3	461	297	W2
Chicago Bears	7	9	0	.438	3–3	5–7	327	375	W2
Detroit Lions	2	14	0	.125	0–6	1–11	262	494	L6

== Regular season results ==
=== Week 1: at New Orleans Saints ===
Week One: Detroit Lions (0–0) at New Orleans Saints (0–0)

Quarter	1	2	3	4	Total
Lions	3	7	17	0	27
Saints	14	14	10	7	45

at Louisiana Superdome, New Orleans, Louisiana

- Game time: 1:00 pm EDT
- Game weather: none (domed stadium)
- Game attendance: 69,719
- Referee: Mike Carey
- TV announcers (Fox): Chris Myers, Trent Green & Jennifer Hammond

The Lions began their season down south, taking on the New Orleans Saints. The Saints struck first with just over 12 minutes left in the first quarter with a 9-yard TD catch by Marques Colston from Drew Brees. They made it 14–0 3 minutes later when Robert Meachem caught a 29-yard TD pass by Brees. The Lions got on the board with just over 5 minutes left in the first quarter with a 47-yard Jason Hanson field goal. They scored again just after the start of the second quarter when Kevin Smith ran in a TD from 4 yards out. The Saints responded 10 minutes later with 2 back to back touchdowns by Jeremy Shockey: from 1 yard and 15 yards respectively, putting the Saints up 28–10 at halftime. After the break, Lions QB Matthew Stafford ran a TD in himself from 1 yard out. The Saints responded a few minutes later with a 39-yard field goal by John Carney. The Lions countered with a 24-yard Jason Hanson field goal 3 minutes later. Less than 20 seconds later, the Saints' Devery Henderson caught a 58 TD-yard pass. The Lions responded when Louis Delmas picked up a Saints fumble and ran it back 65 yards for a TD. The only score of the 4th quarter was a 13-yard TD catch by Heath Evans of the Saints. With this loss, the Lions began 2009 0–1 which brought their losing streak to eighteen consecutive regular season games.

=== Week 2: vs. Minnesota Vikings ===
Week Two: Minnesota Vikings (1–0) at Detroit Lions (0–1)

Quarter	1	2	3	4	Total
Vikings	0	7	10	10	27
Lions	3	7	0	3	13

at Ford Field, Detroit, Michigan

- Game time: 1:00 pm EDT
- Game weather: none (domed stadium)
- Game attendance: 56,269
- Referee: Carl Cheffers
- TV announcers (Fox): Ron Pitts & John Lynch

For their home opener, the Lions hosted division rivals the Minnesota Vikings. The Lions struck first with a 30-yard Jason Hanson field goal in the first quarter. They went ahead 10–0 in the second quarter when Calvin Johnson caught an 8-yard TD pass from Matthew Stafford. The Vikings got on the board a few minutes later when Visanthe Shiancoe caught a 1-yard TD pass from Brett Favre. The third quarter was all Minnesota: first a 26-yard field goal by Ryan Longwell, then a 27-yard TD run by Adrian Peterson. The Vikings added to their lead in the fourth quarter with another field goal, this one from 46 yards out; then a 3-yard TD catch by Percy Harvin. The Lions got their only points of the second half with a 48-yard field goal. With their 19th straight regular season loss, the Lions fell to 0–2.

=== Week 3: vs. Washington Redskins ===
Week Three: Washington Redskins (1–1) at Detroit Lions (0–2)

Quarter	1	2	3	4	Total
Redskins	0	0	7	7	14
Lions	7	6	0	6	19

at Ford Field, Detroit, Michigan

- Game time: 1:00 pm EDT
- Game weather: none (domed stadium)
- Game attendance: 40,896
- Referee: Scott Green
- TV announcers (Fox): Thom Brennaman and Brian Billick (blacked out locally).

In week 3, the Lions hosted the Washington Redskins. The first half was all Detroit. After a goal line stand on a Redskins 4th and 1, the Lions drove 99 yards and scored with a Bryant Johnson 21-yard TD catch. Next in the second quarter were two field goals by Jason Hanson, from 39 yards and 26 yards out respectively, putting the Lions up 13–0 at halftime. The Redskins got on the board in the third quarter with a 57-yard TD catch by Santana Moss. The Lions scored next with a 2-yard TD run by Maurice Morris but failed on the 2-point conversion. The final score of the game was a 4-yard TD pass by Rock Cartwright. The Lions defense prevented the Redskins' comeback, stopping a touchdown drive in the final seconds of the game. This win was the Lions' first regular-season victory since December 23, 2007, and improved the team's record to 1–2. It ended a franchise-record nineteen consecutive losses, which was also the second-longest losing streak in NFL history behind the 1976–77 Tampa Bay Buccaneers' streak of twenty-six straight losses. Lions radio play-by-play man Dan Miller said of the win and end to the streak, "Nightmare over." (Note: In 2020 and 2021 the Jacksonville Jaguars would pass Detroit’s record by suffering twenty consecutive defeats between the second game of 2020 and the fifth game of 2021 inclusive.)

=== Week 4: at Chicago Bears ===
Week Four: Detroit Lions (1–2) at Chicago Bears (2–1)

Quarter	1	2	3	4	Total
Lions	14	7	0	3	24
Bears	7	14	13	14	48

at Soldier Field, Chicago, Illinois

- Game time: 1:00 pm EDT
- Game weather: 64 °F (18 °C) (partly cloudy)
- Game attendance: 62,192
- Referee: Walt Coleman
- TV announcers (Fox): Thom Brennaman, Brian Billick, & Chris Myers

In week 4, the Lions flew to The Windy City for a NFC North duel with the Chicago Bears. Detroit threw the opening punch in the first quarter with running back Kevin Smith's 1-yard touchdown run. The Bears would respond with quarterback Jay Cutler's 5-yard touchdown run, yet Detroit answered with rookie quarterback Matthew Stafford completing a 14-yard touchdown pass to tight end Will Heller. Chicago took the lead in the second quarter with Cutler's 2-yard touchdown pass to tight end Kellen Davis and a 1-yard touchdown pass to tight end Greg Olsen, but the Lions would tie the game prior to halftime with Smith's 3-yard touchdown run, capping off a 98-yard drive. However, in the third quarter, the Bears would set the tempo for the second half. It immediately began with wide receiver Johnny Knox returning the half's opening kickoff 102 yards for a touchdown, followed by a 52-yard and a 22-yard field goal from kicker Robbie Gould. Detroit tried to rally in the fourth quarter with kicker Jason Hanson's 35-yard field goal, but Chicago pulled away with running back Matt Forté's 37-yard touchdown run and running back Garrett Wolfe's 2-yard touchdown run. Stafford (24-of-36, 296 yards, TD, INT) left the game during the fourth quarter with a knee injury. With the loss, the Lions fell to 1–3.

=== Week 5: vs Pittsburgh Steelers ===
Week Five: Pittsburgh Steelers (2–2) at Detroit Lions (1–3)

Quarter	1	2	3	4	Total
Steelers	7	14	7	0	28
Lions	6	7	0	7	20

at Ford Field, Detroit, Michigan

- Game time: 1:00 pm EDT
- Game weather: none (domed stadium)
- Game attendance: 59,333
- Referee: Ed Hochuli
- TV announcers (CBS): Dick Enberg & Dan Fouts

In week 5, the Lions hosted the defending Super Bowl Champion Pittsburgh Steelers. The Lions scored first with a 46-yard Jason Hanson field goal. The Steelers responded with a 7-yard TD run by Rashard Mendenhall. The Lions replied with another 46-yard field goal. In the second quarter, Pittsburgh scored first with a 15-yard TD catch by Heath Miller from Ben Roethlisberger. The Lions retaliated with a 38-yard interception run for a touchdown by William James. Hines Ward of the Steelers next got a touchdown of his own, a 17-yard catch, making the halftime score 21–13 Pittsburgh. After the break, Mike Wallace of Pittsburgh caught a 47-yard TD pass. The final score of the game was a 25-yard catch by Detroit's Dennis Northcutt. Lions backup QB Daunte Culpepper was sacked 7 times in the loss, 3 of which were on consecutive downs.

=== Week 6: at Green Bay Packers ===
Week Six: Detroit Lions (1–4) at Green Bay Packers (2–2)

Quarter	1	2	3	4	Total
Lions	0	0	0	0	0
Packers	14	9	3	0	26

at Lambeau Field, Green Bay, Wisconsin

- Game time: 1:00 pm EDT
- Game weather: 41 °F (5 °C) mostly cloudy
- Game attendance: 70,801
- Referee: Jerome Boger
- TV announcers (Fox): Kenny Albert, Daryl Johnston, & Tony Siragusa

In week 6, the Lions traveled to Green Bay, Wisconsin to take on NFC North Division foes the Green Bay Packers. They were shut out for the first time since 2001, and the first time by the Packers since 1946. The Packers scored two touchdowns in the first quarter: a 47-yard catch by James Jones from Aaron Rodgers, then a 1-yard catch by John Kuhn. In the second quarter Mason Crosby kicked 3 field goals from 46, 28 and 31 yards respectively. The only score of the second half was a 26-yard field goal. The loss made the losing streak in Wisconsin 18 games, dating back to 1992. Despite the loss, the Lions defense recorded 5 sacks.

=== Week 8: vs St. Louis Rams ===
Week Eight: St. Louis Rams (0–7) at Detroit Lions (1–5)

Quarter	1	2	3	4	Total
Rams	3	7	0	7	17
Lions	0	2	0	8	10

at Ford Field, Detroit, Michigan

- Game time: 1:00 pm EST
- Game weather: none (domed stadium)
- Game attendance: 40,857
- Referee: Ron Winter
- TV announcers (Fox): Ron Pitts & John Lynch (blacked out locally)

In week 8, the Lions hosted the then winless St. Louis Rams. The Rams got on the board first in the first quarter with a 41-yard field goal by Josh Brown. In the second quarter, the Lions' Matthew Stafford threw an interception into the end zone to James Butler but he was tackled by running back Kevin Smith for a Lions safety. Near halftime, the Rams performed a successful fake field goal when kicker Josh Brown passed it to Daniel Fells and he ran it in 36 yards for a touchdown. Both teams went scoreless in the third quarter. In the fourth quarter, Lions' QB Matthew Stafford ran it in himself from 4 yards out for a TD, and tied it up with a 2-point conversion catch by Maurice Morris. The Rams took the lead near the end though with a 25-yard run by Steven Jackson.

This would prove to be the Rams' only victory of the season, preventing them from duplicating the Lions' dubious accomplishment of the previous season. (Note: It might be noted that Pro Football Reference rates the 2009 Rams as worse by 2.8 points than either the 2009 or 2008 Lions, owing to a weak schedule and larger margins of defeat.)

=== Week 9: at Seattle Seahawks ===
Week Nine: Detroit Lions (1–6) at Seattle Seahawks (2–5)

Quarter	1	2	3	4	Total
Lions	17	0	0	3	20
Seahawks	0	13	9	10	32

at Qwest Field, Seattle Washington

- Game time: 4:05 pm EST
- Game weather: 48 °F (9 °C), cloudy
- Game attendance: 67,003
- Referee: John Parry
- TV announcers (Fox): Dick Stockton, Charles Davis

In week 9, the Lions traveled to Seattle, Washington to take on the Seattle Seahawks. The Lions took an early lead in the first quarter, scoring 17 unanswered points. First came 2 TD's: a Brandon Pettigrew 7-yard catch, then a Bryant Johnson 29-yard catch, and afterward was a 41-yard field goal. The Seahawks responded in the second quarter with a TD and 2 field goals. First the TD, a 3-yard run by Julius Jones. The field goals by Olindo Mare were both from 37 yards out. In the 3rd quarter came another Seattle field goal, from 24 yards out. Then, T.J. Houshmandzadeh scored on a 2-yard TD catch to give Seattle the lead. However, the fake field goal for a 2-point conversion was no good. The Lions' only score of the second half was a 50-yard field goal. The Seahawks sealed their win with a 61-yard interception for a TD by Josh Wilson.

=== Week 10: at Minnesota Vikings ===
Week Ten: Detroit Lions (1–7) at Minnesota Vikings (7–1)

Quarter	1	2	3	4	Total
Lions	0	3	7	0	10
Vikings	3	7	7	10	27

at Mall of America Field, Minneapolis, Minnesota

- Game time: 1:00 pm EST
- Game weather: none (domed stadium)
- Game attendance: 63,854
- Referee: Walt Anderson
- TV announcers (Fox): Sam Rosen, Tim Ryan & Chris Myers

In week 10, the Lions traveled to Minneapolis, Minnesota for a rematch with NFC North foes the Minnesota Vikings. The Vikings scored the only points of the first quarter with a 22-yard Ryan Longwell field goal. They added to their lead in the second quarter with a 22-yard TD run by Adrian Peterson. The Lions' only score of the first half was a 38-yard Jason Hanson field goal just before halftime. In the 3rd quarter the Vikings further added to their lead with a 1-yard run by Adrian Peterson, his 2nd TD of the game. The Lions responded with an 8-yard TD from Matthew Stafford to Will Heller. The Vikings sealed their win with a TD and field goal in the 4th. First an 8-yard TD catch by Jeff Dugan from Brett Favre, and finally a 35-yard field goal.

=== Week 11 vs. Cleveland Browns ===
Week Eleven: Cleveland Browns at Detroit Lions

Quarter	1	2	3	4	Total
Browns	24	3	2	8	37
Lions	10	14	7	7	38

at Ford Field • Detroit, Michigan

- Date: November 22
- Game time: 1:00 p.m. EST
- Game weather: None (dome stadium)
- Game attendance: 43,170
- Referee: Terry McAulay
- TV announcers (CBS): Don Criqui and Randy Cross (blacked out locally).
- Gamebook

Game information

First quarter

- CLE – Phil Dawson 44-yard field goal, 11:28. Browns 3–0. Drive: 9 plays, 48 yards, 3:32.
- DET – Jason Hanson 31-yard field goal, 9:13. Tied 3–3. Drive: 5 plays, 5 yards, 2:15.
- CLE – Mohammed Massaquoi 59-yard pass from Brady Quinn (Phil Dawson kick), 8:56. Browns 10–3. Drive: 1 play, 59 yards, 0:17.
- CLE – Chansi Stuckey 40-yard pass from Brady Quinn (Phil Dawson kick), 4:03. Browns 17–3. Drive: 7 plays, 76 yards, 3:33.
- CLE – Joshua Cribbs 4-yard pass from Brady Quinn (Phil Dawson kick), 2:52. Browns 24–3. Drive: 2 plays, 6 yards, 0:47.
- DET – Aaron Brown 26-yard pass from Matthew Stafford (Jason Hanson kick), 0:30. Browns 24–10. Drive: 5 plays, 78 yards, 2:22.

Second quarter

- DET – Kevin Smith 25-yard pass from Matthew Stafford (Jason Hanson kick), 11:44. Browns 24–17. Drive: 7 plays, 61 yards, 2:27.
- DET – Calvin Johnson 75-yard pass from Matthew Stafford (Jason Hanson kick), 5:01. Tied 24–24. Drive: 4 plays, 94 yards, 2:45.
- CLE – Phil Dawson 29-yard field goal, 0:02. Browns 27–24. Drive: 14 plays, 69 yards, 4:59.

Third quarter

- DET – Will Heller 1-yard pass from Matthew Stafford (Jason Hanson kick), 2:47. Lions 31–27. Drive: 10 plays, 84 yards, 5:03.
- CLE – Matthew Stafford intentional grounding in end zone, 0:41. Lions 31–29.

Fourth quarter

- CLE – Michael Gaines 2-yard pass from Brady Quinn (Jamal Lewis run), 5:44. Browns 37–31. Drive: 14 plays, 63 yards, 6:47.
- DET – Brandon Pettigrew 1-yard pass from Matthew Stafford (Jason Hanson kick), 0:00. Lions 38–37. Drive: 10 plays, 88 yards, 1:46.

Top passers

- CLE – Brady Quinn – 21/33, 304 yards, 4 TD
- DET – Matthew Stafford – 26/43, 422 yards, 5 TD, 2 INT

Top rushers

- CLE – Jamal Lewis – 24 rushes, 75 yards
- DET – Kevin Smith – 12 rushes, 45 yards

Top receivers

- CLE – Mohammed Massaquoi – 5 receptions, 115 yards, TD
- DET – Calvin Johnson – 7 receptions, 161 yards, TD

In Week 11, the Lions hosted the Cleveland Browns in an interconference shootout. The Browns built a big lead in the first quarter, scoring first with a 44-yard field goal by Phil Dawson. After a 31-yard Jason Hanson field goal, Cleveland scored 21 points on Brady Quinn touchdowns to Mohamed Massaquoi (59 yards), Chansi Stuckey (40 yards), Joshua Cribbs (four yards). The Lions answered with three consecutive TD passes from Matthew Stafford to Aaron Brown (26 yards) and Kevin Smith (25 yards) and a 75-yard catch and run TD for Calvin Johnson. The Browns responded with a 29-yard field goal just before halftime. In the 3rd quarter Will Heller of the Lions caught a one-yard TD pass. The Browns received a safety when Stafford was tackled in his own end zone and called for intentional grounding. The Browns retook the lead on a two-yard TD catch by Michael Gaines and a Jamal Lewis two-point conversion. Stafford was intercepted on the next Lions possession, but the Lions stopped the Browns on 4th and 5. Then they drove 88 yards. With 2 seconds left, Stafford raced out of the pocket and threw a pass into the end zone which was intercepted by Brodney Pool, but the pick was nullified on a Hank Poteat pass interference penalty, giving the Lions one more play with no time left on the clock. Stafford was brutally hit by two Browns defenders on the play, and suffered what turned out to be a major shoulder separation of his left (non-throwing) arm; he had to come out for the final play and backup Daunte Culpepper went in, but the Browns called time-out; under NFL rules injured players must come out for one play, and the Browns timeout thus made Stafford eligible to return to the field; he told the coaches he wanted to return for the final play (pleading to coaches "If you need me to throw the ball, I can throw the ball") and was allowed to go back in. He then threw a touchdown to Brandon Pettigrew, and Jason Hanson tacked on the extra point for the win. Stafford became the youngest QB to throw five touchdown passes in a game since the AFL-NFL merger in 1970. He also set a record for passing yards in a game by a rookie with 422. For his performance, Stafford won NFC Offensive Player of the Week and Pepsi Rookie of the Week.

The game was made into an NFL Film, with Matthew Stafford mic'ed up. It was shown on NFL Network's NFL Replay and Wired for Sound and became a segment in the "Quarterback Duels" episode of NFL Top 10, as well as Showtime's Inside the NFL. The company's founder Steve Sabol said the Lions' game-winning drive was the most dramatic film he has seen in over 30 years.

=== Week 12: vs. Green Bay Packers (Thanksgiving Day game) ===
Week Twelve: Green Bay Packers (6–4) at Detroit Lions (2–8)

Quarter	1	2	3	4	Total
Packers	0	13	14	7	34
Lions	7	0	0	5	12

at Ford Field, Detroit, Michigan

- Game time: 12:30 pm EST
- Game weather: none (domed stadium)
- Game attendance: 57,383
- Referee: Bill Leavy
- TV announcers (Fox, National TV): Joe Buck, Troy Aikman & Pam Oliver

For their 70th annual Thanksgiving Day game, the Lions hosted a rematch with division rivals the Green Bay Packers. Detroit got an early lead when Matthew Stafford threw a 1-yard TD pass to Calvin Johnson, the only Lions score of the first half. The Packers responded with a TD of their own, a 7-yard toss to Donald Lee. The Packers then kicked 2 field goals: first a 20 yarder and just before halftime a 25 yarder. The Packers scored 2 touchdowns in the 3rd quarter. First a 7-yard catch by Donald Driver, then a 21-yard catch by James Jones. The Lions picked up a safety when the Packers Ryan Grant had his left arm down before he fumbled the ball in their own end zone in the fourth quarter. They then kicked a 22-yard field goal. The Packers sealed their win when Charles Woodson intercepted a Stafford pass and ran it back 38 yards for a touchdown. The Thanksgiving Day losing streak for the Lions is now six, the longest in franchise history. With the loss combined with the Eagles win over the Redskins, the Lions were officially eliminated from postseason contention. This would also become the Packers' 9th straight victory over the Lions, dating back to the second game between the teams in the 2005 season.

=== Week 13: at Cincinnati Bengals ===
Week Thirteen: Detroit Lions (2–9) at Cincinnati Bengals (8–3)

Quarter	1	2	3	4	Total
Lions	7	0	0	6	13
Bengals	0	17	3	3	23

at Paul Brown Stadium, Cincinnati, Ohio

- Game time: 1:00 pm EST
- Game weather: 34 °F (1 °C), partly cloudy
- Game attendance: 62,545
- Referee: Tony Corrente
- TV announcers (Fox): Thom Brennaman, Brian Billick & Laura Okmin

In week 13, the Lions traveled to Cincinnati, Ohio for an interconference contest with the Cincinnati Bengals. Detroit got an early lead in the first quarter with a 54-yard catch and run by Calvin Johnson. The Bengals tied it up in the second when Jonathan Fanene caught a tipped Matthew Stafford pass and ran it back 45 yards for a touchdown. Cincinnati then took the lead and did not give it back when Chad Ochocinco caught a 36-yard TD. The Bengals closed out the first half with a 44-yard field goal by Shayne Graham. In the second half the Bengals scored 2 more field goals, from 39 and 23 yards respectively. The Lions scored the game's final points late in the 4th quarter with a 2-yard run by Kevin Smith. The Lions went for a 2-point conversion but failed.

=== Week 14: at Baltimore Ravens ===
Week Fourteen: Detroit Lions (2–10) at Baltimore Ravens (6–6)

Quarter	1	2	3	4	Total
Lions	0	3	0	0	3
Ravens	3	17	21	7	48

at M&T Bank Stadium, Baltimore, Maryland

- Game time: 1:00 pm EST
- Game weather: 34 °F (1 °C), rain
- Game attendance: 70,673
- Referee: Don Carey
- TV announcers (Fox): Chris Myers & Tim Ryan

In week 14, the Lions traveled to rainy Baltimore, Maryland for an interconference duel with the Baltimore Ravens. Baltimore led for almost the entire game. They scored first late in the first quarter with a 38-yard field goal by Billy Cundiff. They added to their lead with a 62-yard catch and run TD by Derrick Mason from Joe Flacco. The Lions scored their only points of the game near the end of the second quarter with a 22-yard Jason Hanson field goal. A minute later the Ravens responded with a 59-yard rushing TD by Ray Rice. Baltimore finished out the first half with a 25-yard field goal. In the second half the Ravens scored 4 consecutive touchdowns. First a Le'Ron McClain 3-yard run. Then 2 by Willis McGahee: first an 8-yard run, then a 19-yard run. In the fourth quarter, the Ravens capped off their huge victory when Troy Smith ran in a TD from 15 yards. Lions backup quarterback Daunte Culpepper completed less than half of his passes (16 for 34) and threw 2 interceptions.

=== Week 15: vs. Arizona Cardinals ===
Week Fifteen: Arizona Cardinals (8–5) at Detroit Lions (2–11)

Quarter	1	2	3	4	Total
Cardinals	7	10	0	14	31
Lions	0	0	17	7	24

at Ford Field, Detroit, Michigan

- Game time: 1:00 pm EST
- Game weather: none (domed stadium)
- Game attendance: 40,577
- Referee: Jeff Triplette
- TV announcers (Fox): Chris Myers & Tim Ryan (blacked out locally)

In week 15, the Lions hosted the defending the NFC Champion Arizona Cardinals. The first half was all Arizona. First was a Larry Fitzgerald 1-yard catch from Kurt Warner. Next in the second quarter a 48-yard field goal by Mike Nugent. Then near halftime a 1-yard rush by Tim Hightower. After his unproductive first half (6 for 12 and only 64 yards passing and an interception) Lions backup quarterback Daunte Culpepper was replaced by third stringer Drew Stanton who breathed some life into the offense. First though came an interception and 100 yard Lions TD run by Louis Delmas, a tie for the third longest interception TD in team history. A few minutes later Detroit's Maurice Morris ran in a career-high 64-yard TD. In the 4th quarter, the Cardinals responded with an 18-yard Chris Wells TD run. The Lions tied it back up when Stanton ran in his first career rushing TD from 1 yard out. The Cardinals sealed their victory though with just under 2 minutes left when Anquan Boldin caught a 5-yard TD pass. The Lions attempted to tie it back up soon after but were stopped on 4th and 1.

=== Week 16: at San Francisco 49ers ===
Week Sixteen: Detroit Lions (2–12) at San Francisco 49ers (6–8)

Quarter	1	2	3	4	Total
Lions	3	0	0	3	6
49ers	3	3	14	0	20

at Candlestick Park, San Francisco, California

- Game time: 4:05 pm EST
- Game weather: 55 °F (13 °C), sunny
- Game attendance: 69,732
- Referee: Walt Anderson
- TV announcers (Fox): Dick Stockton & Charles Davis

For their last road game of the season, in week 16 the Lions traveled west to San Francisco to play the San Francisco 49ers. The Lions took an early lead midway through the first quarter with a 27-yard Jason Hanson field goal. The 49ers tied it up at the end of the first quarter with a 33-yard field goal by Ricky Schmitt. The only score of the 2nd quarter was a 39-yard 49ers field goal just before halftime. In the third quarter came 2 San Francisco TD's. First a 2-yard catch by Vernon Davis, then a 1-yard run by Frank Gore. The Lions kicked another field goal late in the 4th quarter from 38 yards out. The Lions road losing streak now stands at 20. And for the win, the 49ers improved their record to 7–8. With the loss, the Lions dropped their record to 2–13.

=== Week 17: vs Chicago Bears ===
Week Seventeen: Chicago Bears (6–9) at Detroit Lions (2–13)

Quarter	1	2	3	4	Total
Bears	3	10	7	17	37
Lions	3	7	3	10	23

at Ford Field, Detroit, Michigan

- Game time: 1:00 pm EST
- Game weather: none (domed stadium)
- Game attendance: 56,677
- Referee: Jerome Boger
- TV announcers (Fox): Chris Myers, Trent Green, and Jennifer Hammond

For their season finale, the Lions hosted a rematch with division rivals the Chicago Bears. The Bears started the scoring in the first quarter with a 44-yard field goal by Robbie Gould. The Lions responded with a 42-yard field goal of their own. Then in the second quarter the Bears kicked another field goal, from 28 yards out. The Lions then took the lead with a 12-yard Bryant Johnson TD catch. The Bears took it back just before halftime with a 7-yard Greg Olsen TD catch. In the third quarter the Bears added to their lead with a Devin Aromashodu 9-yard TD catch. The Lions responded with a 48-yard field goal. Later, in the fourth quarter, the Lions tied it up with a 5-yard Calvin Johnson TD catch. The Bears took the lead back though with a Desmond Clark 1-yard TD catch. The Lions then scored their final points of the season, a 32-yard field goal. The Bears responded with another Devin Aromashodu TD catch, this one from 12 yards. The Bears closed out the scoring with a 34-yard field goal.

The loss allowed the Lions to clinch the second overall selection in the 2010 NFL draft behind the St. Louis Rams, who finished 1–15, with their lone victory at Detroit's expense in week 8.

== Awards and records ==
Matthew Stafford

- Most passing touchdowns by a rookie quarterback in a single game (5)

== Local TV Blackouts ==
In the 2009 season, the Lions had four of their 8 home games televised on local TV. The Lions sold out their home opener against the Vikings, as well as a week 5 match up against the Steelers, the Thanksgiving Classic against Green Bay, and their season finale against the Bears. Both of the Lions wins in 2009 were blacked out on local television (the Detroit, Flint/Tri-Cities, Lansing/Jackson and Toledo markets) because the game did not sell out by the 72-hour deadline. In the games that Detroit did not sell out, the attendances were announced at just over 40,000 and quite often, the stadium looked only half full.
