= Clint Session =

American football player (born 1984)

No. 55
- Position: Linebacker

Personal information
- Born: September 22, 1984 (age 42); Pompano Beach, Florida, U.S.
- Listed height: 6 ft 0 in (1.83 m)
- Listed weight: 248 lb (112 kg)

Career information
- High school: Blanche Ely (Pompano Beach)
- College: Pittsburgh
- NFL draft: 2007: 4th round, 136th overall pick

Career history
- Indianapolis Colts (2007–2010); Jacksonville Jaguars (2011–2012)

Career NFL statistics
- Total tackles: 295
- Sacks: 2.5
- Forced fumbles: 5
- Pass deflections: 8
- Interceptions: 4
- Defensive touchdowns: 1
- Stats at Pro Football Reference

Clint Session (born September 22, 1984) is an American former professional football player who was a linebacker in the National Football League (NFL) for the Indianapolis Colts and Jacksonville Jaguars. He played college football for the Pittsburgh Panthers and was selected by the Colts in the fourth round of the 2007 NFL draft.

== Early life ==
Session attended Blanche Ely High School in Pompano Beach, Florida and was an honor student and a letterman in football and track & field. In football, he was a four-year letterman and as a senior, he led his team to the Florida State Title. He was a first-team All-Broward County Athletic Association selection, a first-team All-Broward County selection, a first-team Class 5A All-Florida selection, and an All-Southwest Region selection by PrepStar.

== College career ==
A team captain and two-year starter for the Pittsburgh Panthers, Session finished his college career with 259 tackles, 2.5 sacks, seven forced fumbles, and three interceptions.

== Professional career ==
=== Indianapolis Colts ===
Session was selected by the Indianapolis Colts in the fourth round of the 2007 NFL draft. After spending his rookie season as a backup, he became a starter during his second season. He started 15 of 16 games for the Colts at outside linebacker, recording 94 tackles.

=== Jacksonville Jaguars ===
On July 28, 2011, Session signed a 5-year, $30 million contract with the Jacksonville Jaguars.

In November 2011, Session suffered multiple concussions in a game against the Cleveland Browns. The following week, he was placed on the injured reserve list, ending his season.

Session had not recovered at the beginning of the 2012 season and was placed on the physically unable to perform (PUP) list. He was waived on December 4, 2012.

== NFL career statistics ==
Legend
**Bold**	Career high

=== Regular season ===
Year	Team	Games		Tackles					Interceptions					Fumbles			
Year	Team	GP	GS	Cmb	Solo	Ast	Sck	TFL	Int	Yds	TD	Lng	PD	FF	FR	Yds	TD
2007	IND	13	1	31	23	8	0.0	4	**2**	3	0	3	2	1	0	0	0
2008	IND	**16**	**15**	94	74	**20**	0.0	**11**	0	0	0	0	0	**2**	0	0	0
2009	IND	14	14	**102**	**83**	19	0.5	3	**2**	**35**	**1**	**27**	**5**	1	0	0	0
2010	IND	5	5	38	31	7	**1.0**	1	0	0	0	0	1	0	0	0	0
2011	JAX	9	6	30	19	11	**1.0**	2	0	0	0	0	0	1	0	0	0
		57	41	295	230	65	2.5	21	4	38	1	27	8	5	0	0	0

=== Playoffs ===
Year	Team	Games		Tackles					Interceptions					Fumbles			
Year	Team	GP	GS	Cmb	Solo	Ast	Sck	TFL	Int	Yds	TD	Lng	PD	FF	FR	Yds	TD
2007	IND	1	0	0	0	0	0.0	0	0	0	0	0	0	0	0	0	0
2008	IND	1	1	9	8	1	0.0	**1**	0	0	0	0	0	0	0	0	0
2009	IND	**3**	**3**	**15**	**9**	**6**	0.0	**1**	0	0	0	0	0	0	**2**	0	0
		5	4	24	17	7	0.0	2	0	0	0	0	0	0	2	0	0

== Post-football career ==
Clinton Session owns and operates "Raw Juice" - a smoothie bar in Northeast Indianapolis.

In mid-2015, press reports indicated Session was being sued to provide child support payments to his blind three-year-old daughter.
