= Chad Simpson =

American gridiron football player (born 1985)

No. 29, 35
- Position: Running back

Personal information
- Born: August 22, 1985 (age 41); Miami, Florida, U.S.
- Listed height: 5 ft 9 in (1.75 m)
- Listed weight: 216 lb (98 kg)

Career information
- High school: Miami Edison Senior
- College: Morgan State
- NFL draft: 2008: undrafted

Career history
- Indianapolis Colts (2008–2009); Buffalo Bills (2010)*; Washington Redskins (2010); Winnipeg Blue Bombers (2012–2013); Edmonton Eskimos (2015)
- * Offseason or practice squad member only

Awards and highlights
- Grey Cup champion (2015); Second-team All-MEAC (2006); First-team All-MEAC (2007); MEAC Player of the Year (2007)

Career NFL statistics
- Rushing attempts: 30
- Rushing yards: 147
- Receptions: 6
- Receiving yards: 31
- Return yards: 1,301
- Total touchdowns: 4
- Stats at Pro Football Reference
- Stats at CFL.ca (archive)

Chad Simpson (born August 22, 1985) is an American former professional football player who was a running back in the National Football League (NFL). He played college football for the South Florida Bulls and Morgan State Bears. He was signed by the Indianapolis Colts as an undrafted free agent in 2008.

He was also a member of the Buffalo Bills and Washington Redskins of the NFL, as well as the CFL's Winnipeg Blue Bombers and Edmonton Elks.

== College career ==
Simpson played in 35 games during his four-year college football career. He spent the first two years at South Florida before transferring to Morgan State. In his two years at Morgan State, Simpson became the fourth leading rusher in school history and set the school's single season rushing record in his senior year with 1,402 yards.

== Professional career ==
=== Indianapolis Colts ===
Simpson originally signed by the Indianapolis Colts as an undrafted free agent in 2008. He spent the first 5 games of the 2008 season as a member of the Colts practice squad, then served in the final 11 games of the season as a reserve running back and kickoff returner. He also saw action in a Wild-Card Playoff game against the San Diego Chargers.

During the 2009 season, Simpson appeared in 14 games with the Colts and saw action on special teams in three playoff games including Super Bowl XLIV.

Simpson was waived by the Colts on April 11, 2010.

=== Buffalo Bills ===
Simpson was signed by the Buffalo Bills on May 11, 2010. He was waived on September 4, 2010.

=== Washington Redskins ===
The Washington Redskins signed Simpson on September 21, 2010, after Larry Johnson was released. He was released on July 28, 2011.

=== Winnipeg Blue Bombers ===
On January 19, 2012, it was announced that Simpson had signed with the Winnipeg Blue Bombers. Simpson became the Bombers leading running back in his first season in the CFL. He carried the ball 173 times for 1,039 yards (6.0 average) with 5 touchdowns. Simpson played in the first 9 games of his second season with the Bombers until his season was cut in short by a foot injury. At the time of the injury he was 4th in the league in rushing yards with 581 yards on 108 carries (5.4 average) adding 6 touchdowns. He was not resigned by the Bombers following the 2013 CFL season.

=== Edmonton Eskimos ===
After being out of football for one year the Edmonton Eskimos of the Canadian Football League announced the signing of Chad Simpson. Incumbent Eskimos starting running back John White was announced lost for the 2015 CFL season the previous day.
