= Walter Mendenhall =

American football player (born 1986)

Profile
- Position: Running back

Personal information
- Born: January 22, 1986 (age 40); Chicago, Illinois, U.S.
- Listed height: 6 ft 0 in (1.83 m)
- Listed weight: 227 lb (103 kg)

Career information
- High school: Niles West (Skokie, Illinois)
- College: Illinois (2004–2007); Illinois State (2008)
- NFL draft: 2009: undrafted

Career history
- Philadelphia Eagles (2009)*; Indianapolis Colts (2009)*; Buffalo Bills (2010)*; Cincinnati Bengals (2010)*
- * Offseason or practice squad member only

Walter Mendenhall (born January 22, 1986) is an American former professional football player who was a running back in the National Football League (NFL). He played college football for the Illinois Fighting Illini from 2005 to 2007 before transferring and playing for the Illinois State Redbirds in 2008. He was signed by the Philadelphia Eagles as an undrafted free agent in 2009 and was also a member of the Indianapolis Colts, Buffalo Bills, and Cincinnati Bengals. He is the brother of former Pittsburgh Steelers and Arizona Cardinals running back Rashard Mendenhall.

== Early life ==
Mendenhall grew up in Skokie, Illinois, a suburb of Chicago. He attended Niles West High School, where he and younger brother Rashard Mendenhall formed a powerful backfield combination. In October 2002, Walter, at age 16, rushed for 225 yards on 15 carries and caught three passes for 31 yards. He gained 3,600 all-purpose yards as a high school football player at Niles West.

Walter also played basketball at Niles West, and was recruited by several schools to play college basketball. As a sprinter, he also helped lead the Niles West track team to its first outdoor team title at the 2003 Argo Invitational.

As the Mendenhall brothers were recruited by various colleges, their mother, Sibyl Mendenhall, established the rules. She recalled, "We were getting inundated. Location was a large consideration, so the family could see them play. We narrowed it down to three schools, and then I asked the coaches to take them both. It was important to them to be at the same school. They looked at film and offered both of them [scholarships], per my request."

== College career ==
=== Illinois ===
In August 2003, Mendenahll announced his commitment to play football at the University of Illinois as part of the incoming class of 2004; younger brother Rashard had previously committed to Illinois. He played college football from 2005 to 2007 for the Illinois Fighting Illini. As a redshirt freshman in 2005, Mendenhall saw action principally at the linebacker position. The following year, he drew attention when he outgained brother Rashard at the running back position and was named the offensive star of Illinois' spring game in April 2006. He appeared in 31 games for Illinois, seeing time at running back, linebacker and on special teams. In 2007, Mendenhall rushed for 57 yards on four carries against Minnesota, his only carries of the season. He ran for 30 yards on his first carry of the season. Brother Rashard set an Illinois record with 1,681 rushing yards in 2007. The 2007 Illinois team won the Big Ten Conference championship and advanced to the 2008 Rose Bowl. When Mendenhall picked up his Rose Bowl ring, head coach Ron Zook informed him that he "wasn't in their plans" going forward.

=== Illinois State ===
Although Mendenhall had already received a bachelor's degree in sociology from Illinois, he still had an additional year of college football eligibility. In June 2008, he transferred to Illinois State University in Normal, Illinois, and enrolled as a graduate student. He did not have a scholarship at Illinois State and made the decision to transfer at the recommendation from a former high school teammate. Mendenhall started his first game at Illinois State on November 1, 2008, against Youngstown State. He rushed for 225 yards in the game and led the Redbirds to a 54–44 victory. He had four 100-yard rushing games. He rushed for 811 yards and 11 touchdowns for Illinois State in 2008.

== Professional career ==
After his collegiate career was over, Mendenhall was signed by four NFL teams in 2009 and 2010, but he did not appear in an NFL game. Mendenhall hoped to be selected in the late rounds of the 2009 NFL draft, and Sports Illustrated picked him as one of its 12 small school "draft sleepers." While Mendenhall was not drafted, he was signed by the Philadelphia Eagles in April 2009 as an undrafted free agent. He was waived on June 11, 2009.

Mendenhall was signed by the Indianapolis Colts on August 13, 2009. He was waived on August 18, and re-signed on August 22. He appeared in three pre-season games for the Colts, but he was waived again during final roster cuts on September 5.

Mendenhall was signed by the Buffalo Bills on April 7, 2010, but then waived on May 12, 2010. He was claimed off waivers by the Cincinnati Bengals on May 13, 2010, but waived again on June 18, 2010.

Brother Rashard Mendenhall has played at the running back position for the Pittsburgh Steelers and Arizona Cardinals since 2008 and was a member of the Steelers' Super Bowl XLIII championship team.

== Later life ==
In the fall of 2010, after being released by the Bills, Mendenhall became an assistant football coach at Niles North High School in Skokie. He noted at the time that he was still training and hoped to have another shot at playing in the NFL.
