= Marcus Paschal =

American football player (born 1984)

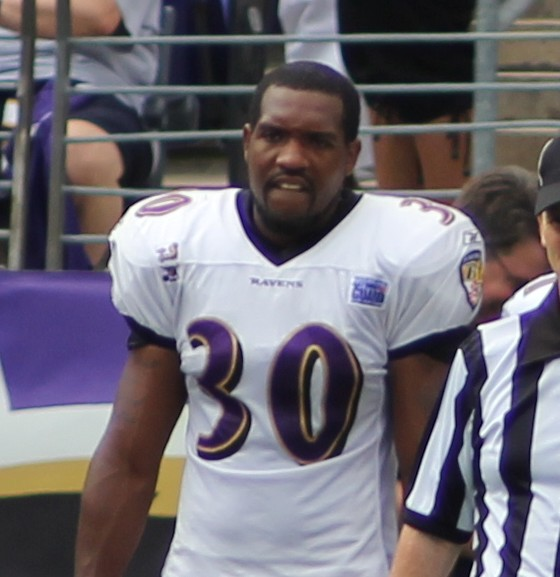
- Paschal during practice at M&T Bank Stadium in August 2011.

No. 32, 30
- Position: Safety

Personal information
- Born: August 31, 1984 (age 42); Clearwater, Florida, U.S.
- Listed height: 6 ft 0 in (1.83 m)
- Listed weight: 201 lb (91 kg)

Career information
- College: Iowa
- NFL draft: 2007: undrafted

Career history
- Philadelphia Eagles (2007); Atlanta Falcons (2009)*; Indianapolis Colts (2009)*; Baltimore Ravens (2009–2010)
- * Offseason or practice squad member only

Awards and highlights
- Second-team All-Big Ten (2006)

Career NFL statistics
- Total tackles: 1
- Stats at Pro Football Reference

Marcus Paschal (born August 31, 1984) is an American former professional football player who was a safety in the National Football League (NFL). He played college football for the Iowa Hawkeyes and was signed by the Philadelphia Eagles as an undrafted free agent in 2007.

Paschal was also a member of the Atlanta Falcons, Indianapolis Colts and Baltimore Ravens.

== Professional career ==
=== Philadelphia Eagles ===
Paschal was signed by the Philadelphia Eagles as an undrafted free agent in May 2007. He was released by the team at the end of training camp and subsequently re-signed to the practice squad, where he spent the first nine weeks of the season. On November 7, he was signed to the active roster after former Iowa Hawkeyes teammate and fellow safety Sean Considine was placed on Injured Reserve.

Paschal was released by the Eagles during final cuts on August 30, 2008.

=== Atlanta Falcons ===
After spending the 2008 season out of football, Paschal was signed to a future contract by the Atlanta Falcons on January 7, 2009. He was released on May 15, 2009.

=== Indianapolis Colts ===
Paschal was signed by the Indianapolis Colts on August 22, 2009, after the team released linebacker Adam Seward. He was waived on September 1 during initial roster cuts.

=== Baltimore Ravens ===
Paschal was signed to the practice squad of the Baltimore Ravens on November 18, 2009. The move reunited him with Ravens head coach John Harbaugh, who was the defensive backs coach for the Eagles when Paschal played there in 2007. Paschal was promoted to the active roster on December 19 when defensive tackle Brandon McKinney was placed on injured reserve. He was waived on December 22 and re-signed to the practice squad when the team signed safety Keith Fitzhugh. On December 26, Paschal was promoted to the active roster again. He was placed on injured reserve on August 23, 2011, due to a quadriceps injury. He was waived from injured reserve on August 25.

== Personal life ==
Paschal currently is the head coach for the Largo High School (Florida) football team, and has done so since 2014. In his three years, as of 2016, Paschal has achieved a 15–17 record, and helped the Packers become the FHSAA Class 6A-District 7 runner-up in 2014.
