= John Matthews (American football) =

American football player (born 1986)

No. 17, 83
- Position: Wide receiver

Personal information
- Born: July 19, 1986 (age 40); Aurora, Colorado, U.S.
- Listed height: 6 ft 0 in (1.83 m)
- Listed weight: 200 lb (91 kg)

Career information
- High school: Regis Jesuit (Aurora, Colorado)
- College: San Diego (2004–2008)
- NFL draft: 2009: undrafted

Career history
- Indianapolis Colts (2009–2010)*; Jacksonville Jaguars (2010); Miami Dolphins (2011)*; San Francisco 49ers (2011–2012)*
- * Offseason or practice squad member only

Career NFL statistics
- Games played: 3
- Stats at Pro Football Reference

John Ryan Matthews (born July 19, 1986) is an American former professional football player who was a wide receiver in the National Football League (NFL). He was signed by the Indianapolis Colts as an undrafted free agent in 2009. He played college football at San Diego Toreros.

He was also a member of the Jacksonville Jaguars, Miami Dolphins, and San Francisco 49ers.

== Professional career ==
=== Jacksonville Jaguars ===
Matthews was claimed of waivers by the Jacksonville Jaguars on July 21, 2010. He was cut on September 4, 2010, but signed on to the Jaguars' practice squad on September 5, 2010. He was elevated to the active roster in time for the week 1 game against the Denver Broncos. He was released on September 16, 2010. Matthews was later re-signed to the Jaguars' practice squad. Prior to Jacksonville's week 10 game against the Houston Texans, he was elevated to the active roster.

He was waived on August 13, 2011.

=== Miami Dolphins ===
Matthews signed with the Miami Dolphins on August 16, 2011, and was released on September 2, 2011, becoming a free agent.

=== San Francisco 49ers ===
Matthews was signed to the practice squad on October 4, 2011. On November 15, 2011, Matthews was released from the 49ers' practice squad, when safety Mark Legree was signed to practice squad, but was re-signed on November 29, 2011. He was released from the 49ers on May 14, 2012.

== Personal life ==
He resides in Littleton, Colorado. He attended Regis Jesuit High School in Aurora, Colorado.
