= Colin Cloherty =

American football player (born 1987)

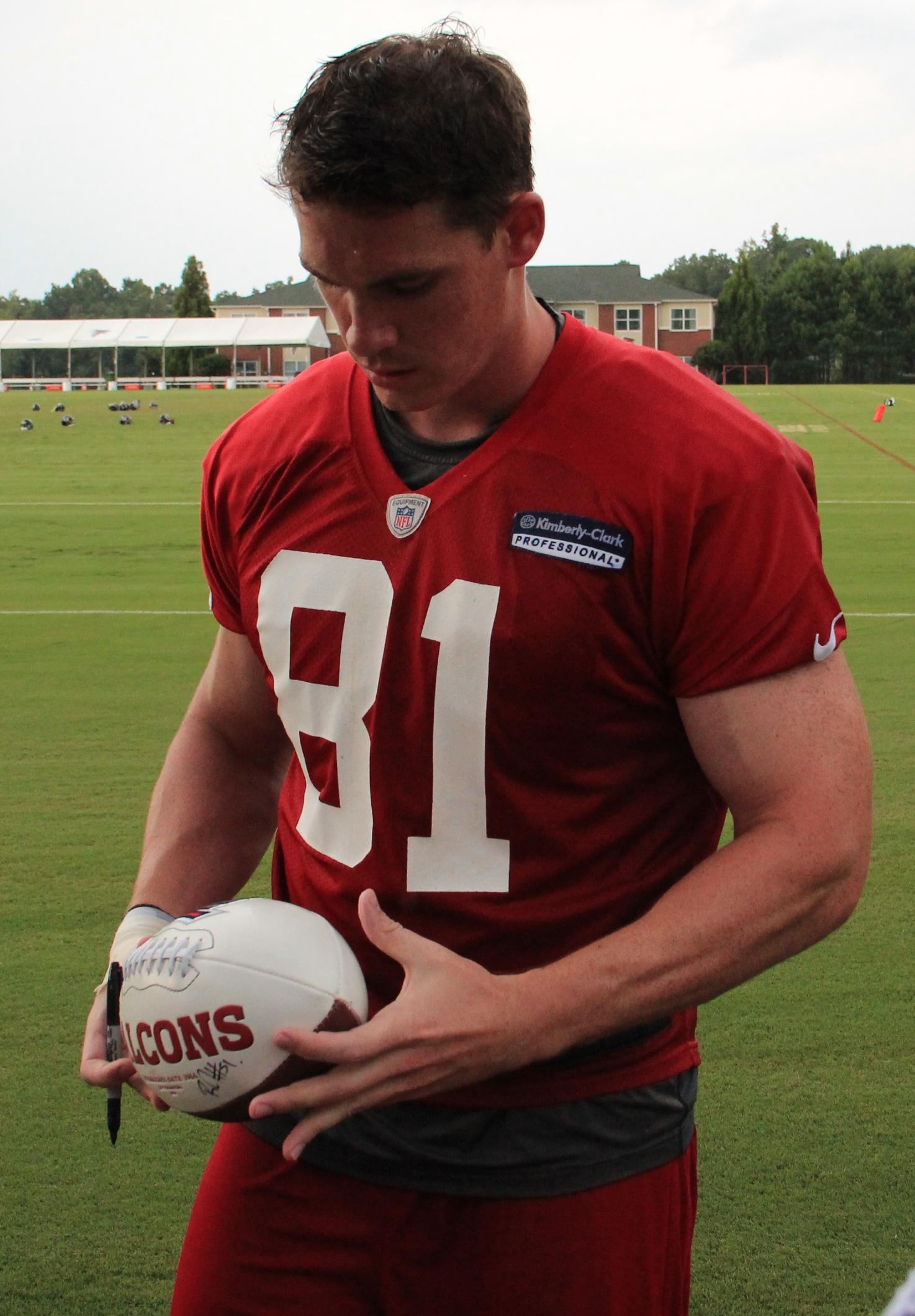
- Cloherty with the Atlanta Falcons in 2013

No. 46, 83
- Position: Tight end

Personal information
- Born: September 16, 1987 (age 39); Bethesda, Maryland, U.S.
- Listed height: 6 ft 2 in (1.88 m)
- Listed weight: 245 lb (111 kg)

Career information
- High school: Gonzaga College (Washington, D.C.)
- College: Brown
- NFL draft: 2009: undrafted

Career history
- Indianapolis Colts (2009)*; Cleveland Browns (2009)*; Indianapolis Colts (2009); San Francisco 49ers (2010); Jacksonville Jaguars (2011–2012); Atlanta Falcons (2013)*
- * Offseason or practice squad member only

Awards and highlights
- Second-team All-Ivy League (2007); First-team All-Ivy League (2008)

Career NFL statistics
- Receptions: 5
- Receiving yards: 59
- Stats at Pro Football Reference

Colin Joseph Cloherty (born September 16, 1987) is an American former professional football player who was a tight end in the National Football League (NFL). He played college football for the Brown Bears and was signed by the Indianapolis Colts as an undrafted free agent in 2009.

Cloherty was also a member of the Cleveland Browns, San Francisco 49ers, Jacksonville Jaguars, and Atlanta Falcons.

== Professional career ==
=== Indianapolis Colts ===
Cloherty was signed as an undrafted free agent by the Indianapolis Colts on April 30, 2009. He was waived on August 31. He played in the final game of the season, catching 1 pass for 2 yards.

=== Cleveland Browns ===
On October 21, 2009, Cloherty was signed to the practice squad of the Cleveland Browns. He was released on November 9.

=== Second stint with Colts ===
Cloherty was signed to the Colts active roster on January 2, 2010. He was released on September 4.

=== San Francisco 49ers ===
On October 6, 2010, Cloherty was signed to the practice squad of the San Francisco 49ers. He was signed to the active roster on December 18, and appeared in the final two games of the season. The team waived him on August 23, 2011.

=== Jacksonville Jaguars ===
On December 11, 2011, Cloherty scored his first NFL touchdown by recovering a muffed punt against the Tampa Bay Buccaneers. He also had 4 receptions for 57 yards during the season. Cloherty spent the 2012 preseason with the team before being released on August 31.

He was re-signed on September 4 after an injury to reserve tight end Brett Brackett.

He was released by the Jaguars on September 10, 2012.

=== Atlanta Falcons ===
Cloherty signed with the Atlanta Falcons on June 18, 2013. He was waived by the Falcons on August 25, 2013.
