= John Gill (American football) =

American football player (born 1986)

No. 69
- Position: Defensive tackle

Personal information
- Born: October 28, 1986 (age 40); Cupertino, California, U.S.
- Listed height: 6 ft 3 in (1.91 m)
- Listed weight: 302 lb (137 kg)

Career information
- High school: Bellarmine College Prep (San Jose, California)
- College: Northwestern
- NFL draft: 2009: undrafted

Career history
- Detroit Lions (2009)*; Indianapolis Colts (2009–2010); Philadelphia Eagles (2012)*; St. Louis Rams (2012)*
- * Offseason or practice squad member only

Awards and highlights
- 2× All-Big Ten (2007–2008)

Career NFL statistics
- Tackles: 9
- Sacks: 0
- Forced fumbles: 0
- Stats at Pro Football Reference

John Singh Gill (born October 28, 1986) is an American former professional football player who was a defensive tackle in the National Football League (NFL). He was signed by the Detroit Lions in 2009. He played college football for the Northwestern Wildcats, and started all 4 years, also graduating from Northwestern with a degree in communications. He is originally from California and played high school football at Bellarmine College Prep.

Gill played in the NFL for the Indianapolis Colts at defensive tackle and long snapper. He played in multiple games for the Colts. He was a member of the team for the 2009 Super Bowl against the New Orleans Saints in Miami. Gill also played for the Philadelphia Eagles and St. Louis Rams. After playing in the NFL, Gill moved to the Boston area and started working in software sales.
