= Terrance Taylor (American football) =

American football player (born 1986)

No. 67
- Position: Defensive tackle

Personal information
- Born: May 14, 1986 (age 40); Muskegon, Michigan, U.S.
- Listed height: 6 ft 0 in (1.83 m)
- Listed weight: 319 lb (145 kg)

Career information
- High school: Muskegon
- College: Michigan
- NFL draft: 2009: 4th round, 136th overall pick

Career history
- Indianapolis Colts (2009)*; Carolina Panthers (2009)*; Detroit Lions (2009)*; Spokane Shock (2011); Pittsburgh Power (2011–2012); Spokane Shock (2013–2015); Orlando Predators (2016); West Michigan Ironmen (2017); Baltimore Brigade (2017–2018); Columbus Destroyers (2019)
- * Offseason or practice squad member only

Awards and highlights
- Second-team All-Big Ten (2007)

Career AFL statistics
- Total tackles: 84.5
- Sacks: 23
- Forced fumbles: 15
- Interceptions: 2
- Stats at ArenaFan.com

Terrance Terlie Taylor (born May 14, 1986) is an American former professional football player who was a defensive tackle in the National Football League (NFL). He was selected by the Indianapolis Colts in the fourth round of the 2009 NFL draft. He played college football for the Michigan Wolverines. In high school, he won the state title in wrestling.

Taylor was also a member of the Carolina Panthers, Detroit Lions, Spokane Shock, Pittsburgh Power, Orlando Predators, West Michigan Ironmen, Baltimore Brigade, and Columbus Destroyers.

== Professional career ==
=== Indianapolis Colts ===
Taylor was selected by the Indianapolis Colts in the fourth round (136th overall) of the 2009 NFL draft. He was waived by the team during final cuts on September 5.

=== Carolina Panthers ===
Taylor was signed to the practice squad of the Carolina Panthers on October 14, 2009, only to be released on October 20.

=== Detroit Lions ===
Taylor was signed to the practice squad of the Detroit Lions on December 15, 2009. He was released on December 20, only to be re-signed to the practice squad on December 23.

After his contract expired following the 2009 season, the Lions re-signed Taylor to a future contract on January 5, 2010. He was waived on April 26, 2010.

=== Spokane Shock (first stint) ===
Taylor was signed by the Spokane Shock of the Arena Football League on January 20, 2011.

=== Pittsburgh Power ===
Taylor was traded to the Pittsburgh Power on May 29, 2011. He made his Power debut on June 11, 2011, against the Tampa Bay Storm.

=== Spokane Shock (second stint) ===
Taylor returned to the Shock for the 2013 season and stayed through to the 2015 season.

=== Orlando Predators ===
On March 23, 2016, Taylor was claimed off reassignment by the Orlando Predators.

=== West Michigan Ironmen ===
On March 1, 2017, Taylor signed with the West Michigan Ironmen of Champions Indoor Football.

=== Baltimore Brigade ===
On May 25, 2017, Taylor was assigned to the Baltimore Brigade.

=== Columbus Destroyers ===
On March 6, 2019, Taylor was assigned to the Columbus Destroyers.
