= 2007 Indianapolis Colts season =

55th season in franchise history; last at the RCA Dome

- Owner: Jim Irsay
- General manager: Bill Polian
- Head coach: Tony Dungy
- Offensive coordinator: Tom Moore
- Defensive coordinator: Ron Meeks
- Home stadium: RCA Dome

Results
- Record: 13–3
- Division place: 1st AFC South
- Playoffs: Lost Divisional Playoffs (vs. Chargers) 24–28
- Pro Bowlers: QB Peyton Manning; RB Joseph Addai; WR Reggie Wayne; C Jeff Saturday; SS Bob Sanders; FS Antoine Bethea

Uniform
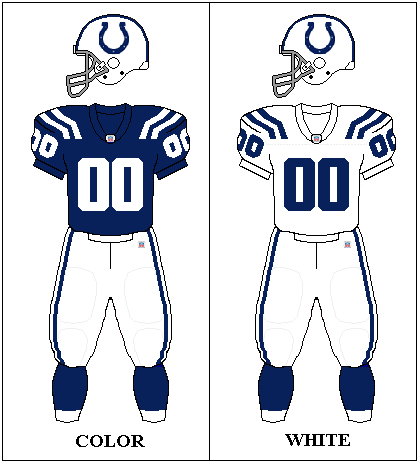

The 2007 Indianapolis Colts season was the franchise's 55th season in the National Football League (NFL), the 24th in Indianapolis and the 6th season under head coach Tony Dungy. The defending AFC and Super Bowl champions improved upon their 12–4 record from 2006 as well as won their fifth-straight AFC South Championship. They finished the season 13–3 and lost to the San Diego Chargers in the Divisional Round of the playoffs.

The Colts remained under the supervision of head coach Tony Dungy and played all of their home games in the RCA Dome in Indianapolis, Indiana. 2007 was the Colts' final season in the RCA Dome, as they began playing home games in Lucas Oil Stadium in 2008. In early January 2007 the Colts were the co-favorites to win Super Bowl XLII, along with the San Diego Chargers. Also this season Colts star quarterback Peyton Manning’s younger brother Eli Manning (who was the quarterback for the New York Giants) made it to Super Bowl XLII and won defeating the undefeated New England Patriots.

== Offseason ==
=== Franchise tagged ===
- DE Dwight Freeney

=== Released ===
- DB Trevis Coley
- TE Jerome Collins
- LB Gilbert Gardner
- LB Johnathan Goddard
- LB Brandon Hoyte
- LB Mike Labinjo
- DT Montae Reagor
- DB Dexter Reid
- WR Brandon Stokley
- DE Jonathan Welsh

=== Additions ===
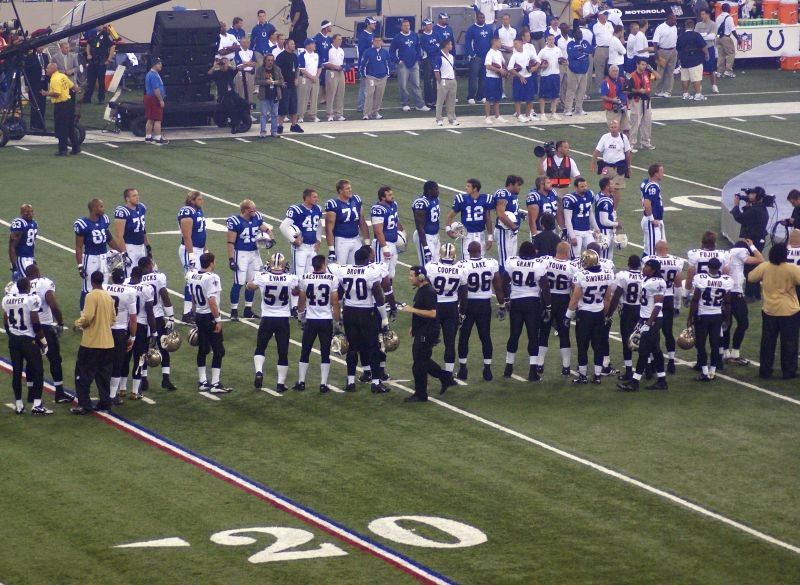
Colts and New Orleans Saints players line up on NFL opening day, September 6, 2007

- Defensive back coach Rod Perry, from Carolina Panthers.
- OG Rick DeMulling
- P Reggie Hodges
- LB Mike Labinjo
- S Norman LeJeune
- QB John Navarre
- TE Mike Seidman

=== Re-signings ===
- LB Rocky Boiman
- DT Dan Klecko
- OG Ryan Lilja
- LB Rob Morris
- G Jake Scott
- QB Jim Sorgi
- DE Josh Thomas
- DE Dwight Freeney

=== Departures ===
- CB Jason David to New Orleans Saints
- SS Mike Doss to Minnesota Vikings
- CB Nick Harper to Tennessee Titans
- LB Cato June to Tampa Bay Buccaneers
- DT Montae Reagor to Philadelphia Eagles
- RB Dominic Rhodes to Oakland Raiders
- WR Brandon Stokley to Denver Broncos

== 2007 NFL draft ==
The Colts started out by making the 32nd overall pick in the 2007 NFL Draft due to their victory in Super Bowl XLI. They selected Anthony Gonzalez out of Ohio State. The 2007 NFL Draft was held on April 28 and 29, 2007, in New York City.

2007 Indianapolis Colts Draft Selections
Draft order		Player name	Position	Height	Weight	College
Round	Choice	Player name	Position	Height	Weight	College
1	32	Anthony Gonzalez	WR	6 ft 0 in (1.83 m)	195 lb (89 kg)	Ohio State
2	42	Tony Ugoh	OT	6 ft 5 in (1.96 m)	305 lb (139 kg)	Arkansas
3	95	Dante Hughes	CB	6 ft 2 in (1.88 m)	188 lb (85 kg)	California
3	98	Quinn Pitcock	DT	6 ft 3 in (1.91 m)	295 lb (134 kg)	Ohio State
4	131	Brannon Condren	S	6 ft 1 in (1.85 m)	204 lb (93 kg)	Troy
4	136	Clint Session	LB	6 ft 0 in (1.83 m)	235 lb (107 kg)	Pittsburgh
5	169	Roy Hall	WR	6 ft 3 in (1.91 m)	240 lb (109 kg)	Ohio State
5	173	Michael Coe	CB	6 ft 1 in (1.85 m)	190 lb (86 kg)	Alabama State
7	242	Keyunta Dawson	DE	6 ft 3 in (1.91 m)	268 lb (115 kg)	Texas Tech

compensatory selection

2007 Indianapolis Colts Draft Day Trades
Round	Overall	Team	Received
2	42	from San Francisco 49ers	Received San Francisco's second-round pick (42 overall) in 2007 for first fourth-round selection (126 overall) and first-round pick in the 2008 NFL draft (29 overall).
2	64	to Tampa Bay Buccaneers	For Booger McFarland.
6	206	to Tennessee Titans	For the 238 overall selection in the 2006 NFL draft.

=== Undrafted free agent signings ===
The Colts signed 15 undrafted free agents on Monday, April 30, 2007:

- LB Brandon Archer
- DB Melvin Bullitt (Texas A&M)
- DE Cameron Craig (Army)
- RB Clifton Dawson (Harvard)
- WR Michael DePriest
- DT Quintin Echols (Kansas State)
- LB Ramon Guzman
- LB KaMichael Hall (Georgia Tech)
- TE Jonny Harline
- OT Joe Lobdell (Northern Iowa)
- DT Ramel Meekins (Rutgers)
- TE Gijon Robinson
- WR Trent Shelton
- DB Antonio Smith (Ohio State)
- LB Victor Worsley

== Roster ==
Indianapolis Colts 2007 final roster
Quarterbacks: 18 Peyton Manning; 12 Jim Sorgi; Running backs: 29 Joseph Addai; 30 Clifton Dawson; 36 Kenton Keith; 45 Luke Lawton; Wide receivers: 80 Devin Aromashodu; 11 Anthony Gonzalez; 88 Marvin Harrison; 15 Craphonso Thorpe KR/PR; 87 Reggie Wayne; Tight ends: 44 Dallas Clark; 81 Bryan Fletcher; 86 Ben Utecht	Offensive linemen: 71 Ryan Diem T; 57 Dylan Gandy C/G; 72 Corey Hilliard T; 74 Charlie Johnson T; 65 Ryan Lilja G; 63 Jeff Saturday C; 73 Jake Scott G; 75 Michael Toudouze G/T; 67 Tony Ugoh T; Defensive linemen: 79 Raheem Brock DT; 60 Jeff Charleston DE; 96 Keyunta Dawson DE/DT; 99 Ed Johnson DT; 90 Dan Klecko DT; 98 Robert Mathis DE; 97 Quinn Pitcock DT; 95 Darrell Reid DE/DT; 91 Josh Thomas DE	Linebackers: 53 Brandon Archer OLB; 50 Rocky Boiman OLB; 58 Gary Brackett MLB; 52 Ramon Guzman MLB; 56 Tyjuan Hagler OLB; 54 Freddy Keiaho OLB; 55 Clint Session OLB; Defensive backs: 41 Antoine Bethea FS; 33 Melvin Bullitt SS; 25 Michael Coe CB; 42 Brannon Condren FS; 43 Matt Giordano FS; 26 Kelvin Hayden CB; 28 Marlin Jackson CB; 23 Tim Jennings CB; 35 Keiwan Ratliff CB; 34 T. J. Rushing CB/KR/PR; 21 Bob Sanders SS; Special teams: 17 Hunter Smith P; 48 Justin Snow LS; 4 Adam Vinatieri K	Reserve lists: 76 Daniel Federkeil T (IR); 93 Dwight Freeney DE (IR); 83 Roy Hall WR (IR); 20 Dante Hughes CB (IR); 92 Anthony McFarland DT (IR); 85 Aaron Moorehead WR (IR); 94 Rob Morris LB (IR); 42 Mike Seidman TE (IR); 37 Antonio Smith CB (IR); 51 Victor Worsley LB (IR); Practice squad: 9 Josh Betts QB; 69 Joe Bradley DT; 64 Mike Elgin C/G; 27 Justise Hairston RB; 64 Ben Ishola DE ^{Int'l}; 16 Onrea Jones WR; 47 Gijon Robinson TE; 68 Pat Ross C/G; 13 Trent Shelton WR; rookies in italics 53 active, 10 inactive, 9 practice squad

== Staff ==
Indianapolis Colts 2007 coaching staff
Front office: Owner/CEO – James Irsay; President – Bill Polian; Senior executive vice president – Pete Ward; Executive vice president – Bob Terpening; Vice president of football operations – Chris Polian; Director of player personnel – Tom Telesco; Director of pro player personnel – Clyde Powers; Head coaches: Head coach – Tony Dungy; Assistant head coach/quarterbacks – Jim Caldwell; Offensive coaches: Offensive coordinator – Tom Moore; Running backs – Gene Huey; Wide receivers – Clyde Christensen; Tight ends – Ricky Thomas; Offensive line – Howard Mudd; Offensive quality control – Pete Metzelaars	Defensive coaches: Defensive coordinator – Ron Meeks; Defensive line – John Teerlinck; Linebackers – Mike Murphy; Defensive backs – Alan Williams; Special assistant to the defense – Rod Perry; Defensive assistant – Bill Teerlinck; Defensive quality control – Carlos Woods; Special teams coaches: Special teams – Russ Purnell; Strength and conditioning: Strength and conditioning – Jon Torine; Assistant strength and conditioning – Richard Howell

== Schedule ==
=== Preseason ===
Week	Date	Opponent	Result	Record	Venue	Recap
1	August 9	at Dallas Cowboys	L 10–23	0–1	Texas Stadium	Recap
2	August 20	Chicago Bears	L 24–27	0–2	RCA Dome	Recap
3	August 25	Detroit Lions	W 37–10	1–2	RCA Dome	Recap
4	August 31	at Cincinnati Bengals	L 6–14	1–3	Paul Brown Stadium	Recap

=== Regular season ===
Week	Date	Opponent	Result	Record	Venue	Recap
1	September 6	New Orleans Saints	W 41–10	1–0	RCA Dome	Recap
2	September 16	at Tennessee Titans	W 22–20	2–0	LP Field	Recap
3	September 23	at Houston Texans	W 30–24	3–0	Reliant Stadium	Recap
4	September 30	Denver Broncos	W 38–20	4–0	RCA Dome	Recap
5	October 7	Tampa Bay Buccaneers	W 33–14	5–0	RCA Dome	Recap
6	Bye					
7	October 22	at Jacksonville Jaguars	W 29–7	6–0	Jacksonville Municipal Stadium	Recap
8	October 28	at Carolina Panthers	W 31–7	7–0	Bank of America Stadium	Recap
9	November 4	New England Patriots	L 20–24	7–1	RCA Dome	Recap
10	November 11	at San Diego Chargers	L 21–23	7–2	Qualcomm Stadium	Recap
11	November 18	Kansas City Chiefs	W 13–10	8–2	RCA Dome	Recap
12	November 22	at Atlanta Falcons	W 31–13	9–2	Georgia Dome	Recap
13	December 2	Jacksonville Jaguars	W 28–25	10–2	RCA Dome	Recap
14	December 9	at Baltimore Ravens	W 44–20	11–2	M&T Bank Stadium	Recap
15	December 16	at Oakland Raiders	W 21–14	12–2	McAfee Coliseum	Recap
16	December 23	Houston Texans	W 38–15	13–2	RCA Dome	Recap
17	December 30	Tennessee Titans	L 10–16	13–3	RCA Dome	Recap

== Standings ==
AFC South
	W	L	T	PCT	DIV	CONF	PF	PA	STK
^{(2)} Indianapolis Colts	13	3	0	.813	5–1	9–3	450	262	L1
^{(5)} Jacksonville Jaguars	11	5	0	.688	2–4	8–4	411	304	L1
^{(6)} Tennessee Titans	10	6	0	.625	4–2	7–5	301	297	W3
Houston Texans	8	8	0	.500	1–5	5–7	379	384	W1

== Regular season results ==
=== Week 1: vs. New Orleans Saints ===
NFL Kickoff game

Quarter	1	2	3	4	Total
Saints	0	10	0	0	10
Colts	7	3	14	17	41

at RCA Dome, Indianapolis, Indiana

- Game time: 8:30 p.m. EST/7:30 p.m. CST
- Game weather: Game played indoors (Domed stadium)
- Game attendance: 57,361
- Referee: Walt Anderson
- TV announcers (NBC): Al Michaels (play-by-play) and John Madden (color commentator)

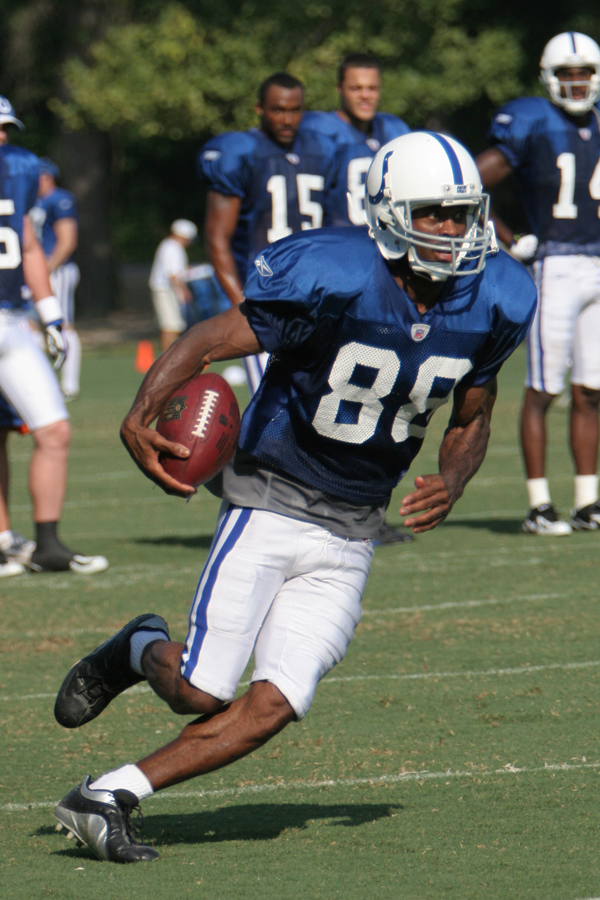
Marvin Harrison at preseason training camp, August 13, 2007

Game Summary
With their championship title to defend, the Colts began the season in the annual Thursday night kickoff game against the visiting New Orleans Saints. In the first quarter, Indianapolis began their year with Super Bowl MVP QB Peyton Manning completing a 27-yard TD pass to WR Marvin Harrison for the only score of the period. In the second quarter, the Saints would get their only touchdown of the game with former Colts DB Jason David returning a fumble 55 yards, while kicker Olindo Mare would get a 34-yard field goal. Indianapolis ended the first half with kicker Adam Vinatieri kicking a 33-yard field goal. In the second half, the Colts took control for the rest of the game. During the third quarter, RB Joseph Addai got a 2-yard TD run, while Manning hooked up with WR Reggie Wayne on a 28-yard touchdown pass. In the fourth quarter, Indianapolis sealed the victory with Vinatieri getting a 33-yard field goal, Manning & Wayne hooking up with each other again on a 45-yard TD pass, and DB Matt Giordano returning an interception 83 yards for a touchdown.

With the win, the Colts began their season at 1–0.

Scoring Summary

- 1st quarter
  - IND – Marvin Harrison 27 yard pass from Peyton Manning (Vinatieri kick), 1:42. Colts 7–0. Drive: 8 plays, 68 yards, 4:32.
- 2nd quarter
  - NO – Jason David 55 yard fumble return (Mare kick), 11:44. Tied 7–7.
  - NO – Olindo Mare 34 yard field goal, 6:30. Saints 10–7. Drive: 9 plays, 36 yards, 3:55.
  - IND – Adam Vinatieri 33 yard field goal, 0:49. Tied 10–10. Drive: 8 plays, 70 yards, 1:39.
- 3rd quarter
  - IND – Joseph Addai 2 yard run (Vinatieri kick), 9:49. Colts 17–10. Drive: 8 plays, 71 yards, 4:07.
  - IND – Reggie Wayne 28 yard pass from Peyton Manning (Vinatieri kick), 6:16. Colts 24–10. Drive: 4 plays, 69 yards, 1:54.
- 4th quarter
  - IND – Adam Vinatieri 33 yard field goal, 14:16. Colts 27–10. Drive: 5 plays, 38 yards, 1:18.
  - IND – Reggie Wayne 45 yard pass from Peyton Manning (Vinatieri kick), 10:11. Colts 34–10. Drive: 5 plays, 66 yards, 2:45.
  - IND – Matt Giordano 83 yard interception return (Vinatieri kick), 1:11. Colts 41–10.

=== Week 2: at Tennessee Titans ===
Quarter	1	2	3	4	Total
Colts	6	10	6	0	22
Titans	3	3	7	7	20

at LP Field, Nashville, Tennessee

- Game time: 1:00 p.m. EST/12:00 p.m. CST
- Game weather: 64 °F (18 °C) (Sunny with partly cloudy skies)
- Game attendance: 69,143
- Referee: Walt Coleman
- TV announcers (CBS): Greg Gumbel (play-by-play) and Dan Dierdorf (color commentator)

Game Summary
Following their second-half blowout win over the Saints, the Colts flew to LP Field for an AFC South duel with the Tennessee Titans. In the first quarter, Indianapolis drew first blood with RB Joseph Addai getting an 8-yard TD run. The Titans would respond with kicker Rob Bironas getting a 30-yard field goal. In the second quarter, the Colts increased their lead with QB Peyton Manning completing a 22-yard TD pass to TE Dallas Clark. Tennessee would answer with Bironas getting a 36-yard field goal. Indianapolis closed out the half with kicker Adam Vinatieri getting a 22-yard field goal.

In the third quarter, Indianapolis kept pounding away as Vinatieri kicked a 39-yard field goal. The Titans replied with RB LenDale White getting a 3-yard TD run. Vinatieri helped the Colts respond with a 20-yard field goal. In the fourth quarter, Tennessee nearly pulled off a comeback, as QB Vince Young completed a 1-yard TD pass to WR Roydell Williams, however, Indianapolis held off the Titans long enough to pull out a win.

With the win, the Colts improved to 2–0.

Scoring Summary

- 1st quarter
  - IND – Joseph Addai 8-yard run (blocked Vinatieri kick), 8:48. Colts 6–0. Drive: 5 plays, 55 yards, 1:50.
  - TEN – Rob Bironas 30-yard field, 1:07. Colts 6–3. Drive: 4 plays, 55 yards, 2:08.
- 2nd quarter
  - IND – Dallas Clark 22-yard pass from Peyton Manning (Vinatieri kick), 11:01. Colts 13–3. Drive: 10 plays, 76 yards, 5:07.
  - TEN – Rob Bironas 36 yard field goal, 4:28. Colts 13–6. Drive: 12 plays, 53 yards, 6:33.
  - IND – Adam Vinatieri 22 yard field goal, 0:01. Colts 16–6. Drive: 7 plays, 79 yards, 1:12.
- 3rd quarter
  - IND – Adam Vinatieri 39 yard field goal, 9:46. Colts 19–6. Drive: 11 plays, 44 yards, 5:19.
  - TEN – LenDale White 3 yard run (Bironas kick), 5:02. Colts 19–13. Drive: 3 plays, 15 yards, 1:22.
  - IND – Adam Vinatieri 20 yard field goal, 0:01. Colts 22–13. Drive: 12 plays, 70 yards, 4:58.
- 4th quarter
  - TEN – Vince Young 1 yard pass to Roydell Williams (Bironas kick), 6:05. Colts 22–20. Drive: 11 plays, 74 yards, 6:24.

=== Week 3: at Houston Texans ===
Quarter	1	2	3	4	Total
Colts	7	7	13	3	30
Texans	7	3	0	14	24

at Reliant Stadium, Houston, Texas

- Game time: 1:00 p.m. EST/12:00 p.m. CST
- Game weather: Game played indoors (Domed stadium)
- Game attendance: 70,765
- Referee: Peter Morelli
- TV announcers (CBS): Ian Eagle (play-by-play) and Solomon Wilcots (color commentator)

Game Summary
Following their fierce divisional road win over the Titans, the Colts flew to Reliant Stadium for an AFC South duel with the Houston Texans (who were the last team Indianapolis lost to en route to their Super Bowl championship). In the first quarter, the Colts trailed early as Houston WR Jerome Mathis returned a kickoff 84 yards for a touchdown. QB Peyton Manning completed a 2-yard TD pass to TE Dallas Clark. In the second quarter, the Texans would retake the lead with kicker Kris Brown getting a 33-yard. RB Joseph Addai helped Indianapolis get back ahead with an amazing 4-yard TD run.

In the third quarter, the Colts pulled away as kicker Adam Vinatieri got a 36-yard field goal, Addai got an 8-yard TD run, and Vinatieri kicked a 28-yard field goal. In the fourth quarter, Houston tried to catch up with RB Samkon Gado getting a 1-yard TD run, while Indianapolis got its final score of the game with a Vinatieri kicking a 35-yard field goal. The Texans would get close with QB Matt Schaub completing a 1-yard TD pass to RB Vonta Leach. The Colts held on to get the victory.

With the win, Indianapolis improved to 3–0.

Scoring Summary

- 1st quarter
  - HOU – Jerome Mathis 84 yard kickoff return (Brown kick), 14:39. Texans 7–0.
  - IND – Dallas Clark 2 yard pass from Peyton Manning (Vinatieri kick), 6:06. Tied 7–7. Drive: 15 plays, 74 yards, 8:33.
- 2nd quarter
  - HOU – Kris Brown 33 yard field goal, 14:18. Texans 10–7. Drive: 13 plays, 54 yards, 6:48.
  - IND – Joseph Addai 4 yard run (Vinatieri kick), 8:46. Colts 14–10. Drive: 11 plays, 65 yards, 5:32.
- 3rd quarter
  - IND – Adam Vinatieri 36 yard field goal, 10:32. Colts 17–10. Drive: 8 plays, 56 yards, 4:28.
  - IND – Joseph Addai 8 yard run (Vinatieri kick), 8:38. Colts 24–10. Drive: 4 plays, 21 yards, 1:35.
  - IND – Adam Vinatieri 28 yard field goal, 2:41. Colts 27–10. Drive: 5 plays, 62 yards, 2:13.
- 4th quarter
  - HOU – Samkon Gado 1 yard run (Brown kick), 14:21. Colts 27–17. Drive: 7 plays, 73 yards, 3:20.
  - IND – Adam Vinatieri 35 yard field goal, 10:40. Colts 30–17. Drive: 7 plays, 34 yards, 3:41.
  - HOU – Vonta Leach 1 yard pass from Matt Schaub (Brown kick), 2:49. Colts 30–24. Drive: 14 plays, 75 yards, 7:51.

=== Week 4: vs. Denver Broncos ===
Quarter	1	2	3	4	Total
Broncos	10	3	7	0	20
Colts	0	14	14	10	38

at RCA Dome, Indianapolis, Indiana

- Game time: 4:15 p.m. EST/3:15 p.m. CST
- Game weather: Game played indoors (Domed stadium)
- Game attendance: 57,274
- Referee: Tony Corrente
- TV announcers (CBS): Jim Nantz (play-by-play) and Phil Simms (color commentator)

Game Summary
Coming off their divisional road win over the Texans, the Colts went home for an intraconference duel with the Denver Broncos. In the first quarter, Indianapolis trailed early with Broncos kicker Jason Elam getting a 35-yard field goal, while QB Jay Cutler 7-yard TD pass to WR Brandon Marshall. In the second quarter, the Colts would respond with RB Joseph Addai getting a 14-yard field goal. Denver tried to increase its lead with Elam kicking a 22-yard field goal. Indianapolis would take the lead with QB Peyton Manning completing a 9-yard TD pass to TE Dallas Clark.

In the third quarter, the Colts began to dominate with Manning getting a 1-yard TD run. He would also hook up with Clark again on a 3-yard TD pass. The Broncos' only response was Cutler's 2-yard TD run. In the fourth quarter, Indianapolis managed to put the game away with Manning's 5-yard TD pass to WR Reggie Wayne, along with kicker Adam Vinatieri nailing a 22-yard field goal.

With the win, the Colts improved to 4–0.

Scoring Summary

- 1st quarter
  - DEN – Jason Elam 35 yard field goal, 11:32. Broncos 3–0. Drive: 8 plays, 47 yards, 3:28.
  - DEN – Brandon Marshall 7 yard pass from Jay Cutler (Elam kick), 2:19. Broncos 10–0. Drive: 10 plays, 86 yards, 5:28.
- 2nd quarter
  - IND – Joseph Addai 14 yard run (Vinatieri kick), 14:23. Broncos 10–7. Drive: 7 plays, 46 yards, 2:56.
  - DEN – Jason Elam 22 yard field goal, 8:29. Broncos 13–7. Drive: 12 plays, 76 yards, 5:54.
  - IND – Dallas Clark 9 yard pass from Peyton Manning (Vinatieri kick), 3:49. Colts 14–13. Drive: 9 plays, 61 yards, 4:40.
- 3rd quarter
  - IND – Peyton Manning 1 yard run (Vinatieri kick), 11:46. Colts 21–13. Drive: 7 plays, 73 yards, 3:14.
  - IND – Dallas Clark 3 yard pass (Vinatieri kick), 8:55. Colts 28–13. Drive: 4 plays, 24 yards, 2:03.
  - DEN – Jay Cutler 2 yard run (Elam kick), 1:10. Colts 28–20. Drive: 14 plays, 79 yards, 7:45.
- 4th quarter
  - IND – Reggie Wayne 5 yard pass from Peyton Manning (Vinatieri kick), 10:56. Colts 35–20. Drive: 10 plays, 83 yards, 5:14.
  - IND – Adam Vinatieri 22 yard field goal, 2:34. Colts 38–20. Drive: 13 plays, 76 yards, 5:59.

=== Week 5: vs. Tampa Bay Buccaneers ===
Quarter	1	2	3	4	Total
Buccaneers	0	7	0	7	14
Colts	7	9	7	10	33

at RCA Dome, Indianapolis, Indiana

- Game time: 4:05 p.m. EST/3:05 p.m. CST
- Game weather: Game played indoors (Domed stadium)
- Game attendance: 57,301
- Referee: Mike Carey
- TV announcers (Fox): Kenny Albert (play-by-play) and Daryl Johnston (color commentator)

Game Summary
Coming off their home win over the Broncos, the Colts stayed at home for an interconference game with the Tampa Bay Buccaneers. Indianapolis would enter into this game without WR Marvin Harrison and RB Joseph Addai, due to injuries from their last game.

In the first quarter, the Colts got the first strike with QB Peyton Manning completing a 10-yard TD pass to TE Dallas Clark for the only score of the period. In the second quarter, Indianapolis increased its lead with rookie RB Kenton Keith getting a 1-yard TD run (with a blocked PAT). The Buccaneers would get their only score of the half with QB Jeff Garcia completing a 3-yard TD pass to TE Alex Smith.

In the third quarter, Keith got a 7-yard TD run for the only score of the period. In the fourth quarter, Tampa Bay got its last score of the game with Garcia and Smith combining on another 3-yard TD pass. Afterwards, Indianapolis sealed the win kicker Adam Vinatieri nailing a 35-yard field goal.

With the win, the Colts entered their bye week at 5–0.

Scoring summary

- 1st quarter
  - IND – Dallas Clark 10 yard pass from Peyton Manning (Vinatieri kick), 10:10. Colts 7–0. Drive: 7 plays, 42 yards, 2:49.
- 2nd quarter
  - IND – Kenton Keith 1 yard run (kick blocked), 14:53. Colts 13–0. Drive: 14 plays, 74 yards, 8:09.
  - TB – Alex Smith 3 yard pass from Jeff Garcia (Bryant kick), 6:43. Colts 13–7. Drive: 9 plays, 56 yards, 5:32.
  - IND – Adam Vinatieri 27 yard field goal, 0:00. Colts 16–7. Drive: 12 plays, 67 yards, 2:01.
- 3rd quarter
  - IND – Kenton Keith 7 yard run (Vinatieri kick), 7:23. Colts 23–7. Drive: 13 plays, 77 yards, 7:37.
- 4th quarter
  - IND – Reggie Wayne 9 yard pass from Peyton Manning (Vinatieri kick), 14:57. Colts 30–7. Drive: 11 plays, 68 yards, 5:45.
  - TB – Alex Smith 3 yard pass from Jeff Garcia (Bryant kick), 9:21. Colts 30–14. Drive: 12 plays, 81 yards, 5:36.
  - IND – Adam Vinatieri 35 yard field goal, 2:53. Colts 33–14. Drive: 11 plays, 67 yards, 6:28.

=== Week 7: at Jacksonville Jaguars ===
Quarter	1	2	3	4	Total
Colts	7	10	2	10	29
Jaguars	0	0	7	0	7

at Jacksonville Municipal Stadium, Jacksonville, Florida

- Game time: 8:30 p.m. EST/7:30 p.m. CST
- Game weather: 73 °F (23 °C) (Partly cloudy)
- Game attendance: 67,164
- Referee: Scott Green
- TV announcers (ESPN): Mike Tirico (play-by-play), Tony Kornheiser and Ron Jaworski (color commentators)

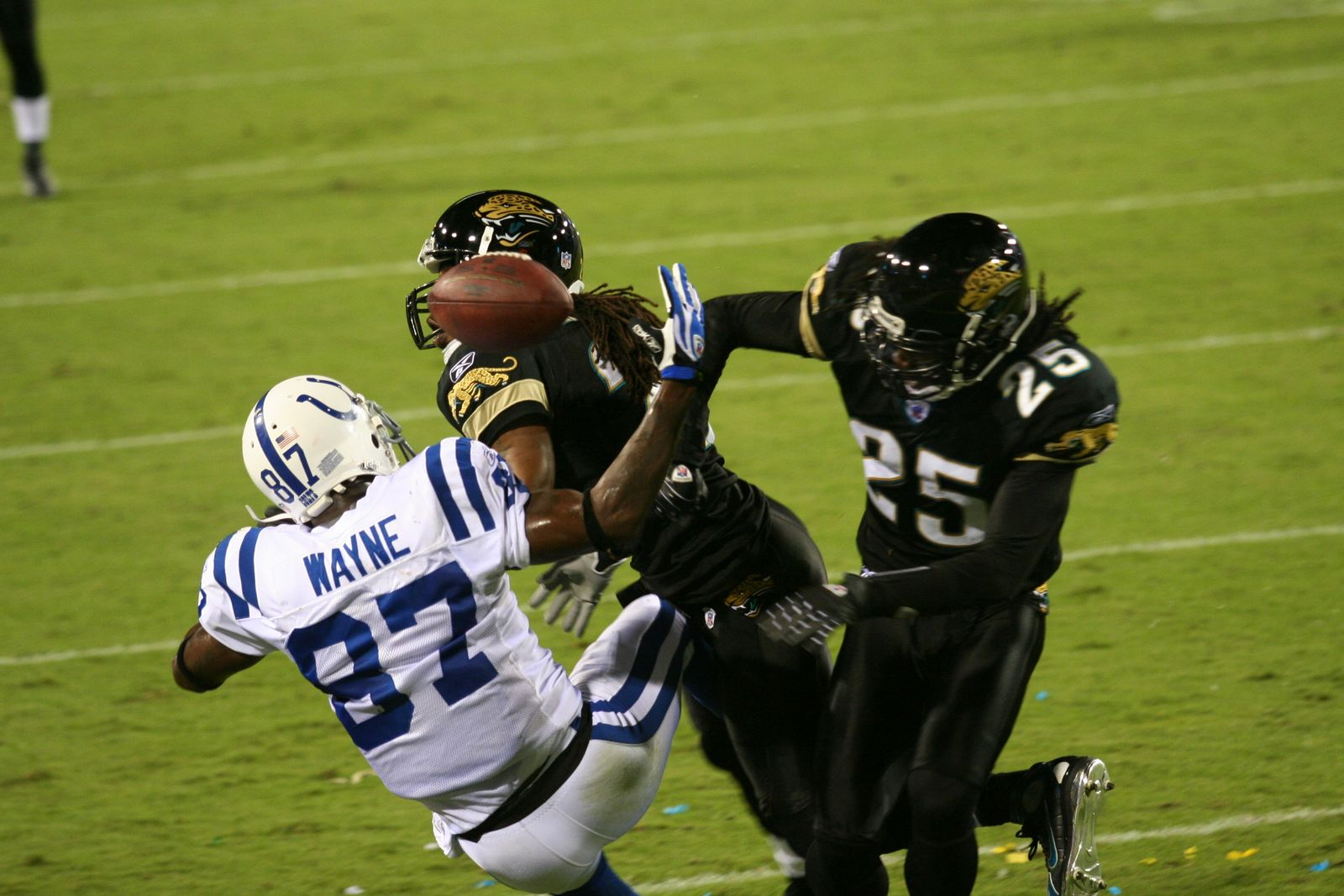
Jacksonville's Reggie Nelson hits Reggie Wayne, October 22, 2007

Game summary
Coming off their bye week, the Colts flew to Jacksonville Municipal Stadium for an AFC South duel on Monday Night Football with the Jacksonville Jaguars, with first place within the division on the line. In the first quarter, Indianapolis scored first with RB Kenton Keith getting a 3-yard TD run for the only score of the period. In the second quarter, the Colts increased its lead with QB Peyton Manning getting a 1-yard TD run, along with kicker Adam Vinatieri getting a 36-yard field goal.

In the third quarter, the Jaguars would get its only score of the game as RB Maurice Jones-Drew got a 1-yard TD run. Afterwards, Indianapolis responded with DE Dwight Freeney sacking QB Quinn Gray in the endzone for a safety. In the fourth quarter, the Colts wrapped up another win with Vinatieri nailing a 20-yard field goal and Manning completing a 35-yard TD pass to TE Dallas Clark.

With the win, not only did Indianapolis improve to 6–0, but they became the third team in NFL history ('29–'31 Packers & '99–'01 Rams) to begin three consecutive seasons at 6–0.

Scoring Summary

- 1st quarter
  - IND – Kenton Keith 3 yard run (Vinatieri kick), 0:27. Colts 7–0. Drive: 11 plays, 66 yards, 5:06.
- 2nd quarter
  - IND – Peyton Manning 1 yard run (Vinatieri kick), 5:25. Colts 14–0. Drive: 11 plays, 76 yards, 5:26.
  - IND – Adam Vinatieri 36 yard field goal, 0:29. Colts 17–0. Drive: 11 plays, 30 yards, 2:20.
- 3rd quarter
  - JAC – Maurice Jones-Drew 1 yard run (Carney kick), 9:23. Colts 17–7. Drive: 10 plays, 40 yards, 5:37.
  - IND – Safety by Dwight Freeney, 4:39. Colts 19–7.
- 4th quarter
  - IND – Adam Vinatieri 20 yard field goal, 13:34. Colts 22–7. Drive: 13 plays, 55 yards, 6:01.
  - IND – Dallas Clark 35 yard pass from Peyton Manning (Vinatieri kick), 3:58. Colts 29–7. Drive: 4 plays, 54 yards, 1:06.

=== Week 8: at Carolina Panthers ===
Quarter	1	2	3	4	Total
Colts	3	7	14	7	31
Panthers	7	0	0	0	7

at Bank of America Stadium, Charlotte, North Carolina

- Game time: 1:00 p.m. EST/12:00 p.m. CST
- Game weather: 69 °F (21 °C) (Partly Cloudy)
- Game attendance: 74,005
- Referee: Ed Hochuli
- TV announcers (CBS): Jim Nantz (play-by-play) and Phil Simms (color commentator)

Game Summary
Coming off their Monday Night road win over the Jaguars, the Colts traveled to Bank of America Stadium for a Week 8 interconference duel with the Carolina Panthers. In the first quarter, Indianapolis trailed early as the Panthers capped off an 11-minute and 1 second opening drive with RB DeShaun Foster getting a 3-yard TD run. The Colts would respond with kicker Adam Vinatieri nailing a 20-yard field goal. In the second quarter, Indianapolis took the lead with RB Joseph Addai getting a 2-yard TD run for the only score of the period.

In the third quarter, QB Peyton Manning completed a 4-yard TD pass to Addai and a 59-yard TD pass to WR Reggie Wayne. With those TD passes, Manning surpassed Johnny Unitas for the most touchdown passes in franchise history with 288. In the fourth quarter, Indianapolis wrapped up the victory with Addai getting a 12-yard TD run.

With the win, the Colts improved to 7–0, heading into their undefeated battle with the 8–0 New England Patriots. Also with their win, Indianapolis tied an NFL record for consecutive 7–0 starts with three-straight seasons.

Scoring Summary

- 1st quarter
  - CAR – DeShaun Foster 3 yard run (Kasay kick), 3:59. Panthers 7–0. Drive: 18 plays, 80 yards, 11:01.
  - IND – Adam Vinatieri 20 yard field goal, 0:47. Panthers 7–3. Drive: 6 plays, 18 yards, 2:07.
- 2nd quarter
  - IND – Joseph Addai 2 yard run (Vinatieri kick), 1:33. Colts 10–7. Drive: 8 plays, 86 yards, 1:58.
- 3rd quarter
  - IND – Joseph Addai 4 yard pass from Peyton Manning (Vinatieri kick), 12:11. Colts 17–7. Drive: 8 plays, 60 yards, 2:49.
  - IND – Reggie Wayne 59 yard pass from Peyton Manning (Vinatieri kick), 4:47. Colts 24–7. Drive: 2 plays, 70 yards, 0:46.
- 4th quarter
  - IND – Joseph Addai 12 yard run (Vinatieri kick), 13:09. Colts 31–7. Drive: 11 plays, 55 yards, 4:17.

=== Week 9: vs. New England Patriots ===
Quarter	1	2	3	4	Total
Patriots	0	7	3	14	24
Colts	3	10	0	7	20

at RCA Dome, Indianapolis, Indiana

- Game time: 4:15 p.m. EST/3:15 p.m. CST
- Game weather: Game played indoors (Domed stadium)
- Game attendance: 57,540
- Referee: John Parry
- TV announcers (CBS): Jim Nantz (play-by-play) and Phil Simms (color commentator)

Game Summary
The unbeaten Colts played the undefeated Patriots in Week 9 in a heavily hyped game, dubbed "Super Bowl XLI½" by Chris Berman. Colt kicker and former Patriot Adam Vinatieri gave the Colts an early lead with a 21-yard field goal. However, Randy Moss would help give the Patriots their first lead of the game on a four-yard touchdown reception, his twelfth of the season, tying a Patriots record. After Vinatieri kicked another field goal to make it a 7–6 game, the Colts would regain the lead just before the half when Joseph Addai caught a "dump-off" pass by Peyton Manning and took it 73 yards into the endzone, giving the Colts a 13–7 lead.

Patriots kicker Stephen Gostkowski provided all the third quarter scoring off a 34-yard field goal to cut the Colts lead to 13–10. In the 4th quarter, Manning ran in a play from the Patriot one-yard line to give the Colts a 20–10 lead. However, the Patriots came right back and, with the aid of a 33-yard reception from Donte' Stallworth, the Pats got their first touchdown of the half off a 4-yard catch by Wes Welker. Forcing a punt by the Colts, Kevin Faulk then gave the Patriots a 24–20 lead off a 13-yard reception to give the Patriots their first lead of the half. The Patriots then stopped a drive by the Colts when Peyton Manning was hit by Jarvis Green and fumbled the ball into the hands of Rosevelt Colvin with just under three minutes to go. On third and ten with no timeouts left for the Colts, the Patriots ended any hope for Indianapolis when Welker made a big 12-yard catch to give the Patriots a first down. The Patriots were able to kneel the ball after that to finish off the Colts and the Colts fell to 7–1, losing their first game of the season.

The game was costly in other ways, as some seven starters were knocked out, including Dallas Clark.

Scoring Summary

- 1st quarter
  - IND – Adam Vinatieri 21 yard field goal, 3:05. Colts 3–0. Drive: 7 plays, 88 yards, 3:09.
- 2nd quarter
  - NE – Randy Moss 4 yard pass from Tom Brady (Gostkowski kick), 12:00. Patriots 7–3. Drive: 13 plays, 62 yards, 6:05.
  - IND – Adam Vinatieri 25 yard field goal, 7:34. Patriots 7–6. Drive: 9 plays, 73 yards, 4:26.
  - IND – Joseph Addai 73 yard pass from Peyton Manning (Vinatieri kick), 0:13. Colts 13–7. Drive: 6 plays, 98 yards, 1:33.
- 3rd quarter
  - NE – Stephen Gostkowski 34 yard field goal, 2:22. Colts 13–10. Drive: 11 plays, 75 yards, 6:06.
- 4th quarter
  - IND – Peyton Manning 1 yard run (Vinatieri kick), 9:42. Colts 20–10. Drive: 8 plays, 42 yards, 4:22.
  - NE – Wes Welker 3 yard pass from Tom Brady (Gostkowski kick), 7:53. Colts 20–17. Drive: 7 plays, 73 yards, 1:43.
  - NE – Kevin Faulk 13 yard pass from Tom Brady (Gostkowski kick), 3:15. Patriots 24–20. Drive: 3 plays, 51 yards, 0:43.

=== Week 10: at San Diego Chargers ===
Quarter	1	2	3	4	Total
Colts	0	7	0	14	21
Chargers	16	7	0	0	23

at Qualcomm Stadium, San Diego

- Game time: 8:15 p.m. EST/7:15 p.m. CST
- Game weather: 61 °F (16 °C) (Light Rain to Heavy Rain)
- Game attendance: 67,726
- Referee: Gene Steratore
- TV announcers (NBC): Al Michaels (play-by-play) and John Madden (color commentator)

Game Summary
The San Diego Chargers got out to a fast start from Darren Sproles' 89-yard opening kickoff return for a touchdown. After a later field goal, Sproles would follow up with a 45-yard punt return for a touchdown in the first quarter. He became only the second player in NFL history, and first since 1958, to return a kickoff and a punt for touchdowns in the opening quarter. San Diego failed on the subsequent two-point conversion to lead 16–0. With 8:47 left in the second quarter, LaDainian Tomlinson rushed for a four-yard touchdown to give the Chargers a 23–0 advantage. Peyton Manning would lead the Colts down the field and capped the drive with an 8-yard TD pass to receiver Reggie Wayne. Later, in the fourth quarter, Manning threw a 7-yard score to running back Kenton Keith. Twenty-five seconds later, linebacker Gary Brackett recovered a fumble in the endzone for a touchdown. The Colts attempted a rush for the two-point conversion to tie the game 23–23, but were held short. With a 23–21 lead, the Colts got the ball back with only a few minutes left in the game. They marched down the field into San Diego territory. On fourth down with 1:31 remaining, Adam Vinatieri was put in for a 29-yard field goal try. Vinatieri, despite being known for his clutch kicks and having over a 95% success rate in field goals under 30 yards, missed wide to the right. Vinatieri missed an earlier 42 yard try at the end of the half, going 0–2 in the game. It was the first time since 2001 Vinatieri was 0–2 kicking field goals. The Colts would get the ball back, but Manning would seal a Chargers win by throwing an interception with no time remaining. Manning struggled in the game, throwing a career-high 6 interceptions. The mark is also a Colts franchise record. Chargers cornerback Antonio Cromartie had three interceptions in the game, becoming one of only 11 Chargers to have three picks in a single game. The Colts were heavily injured on both sides of the ball. Receivers Marvin Harrison and Anthony Gonzalez, left tackle Tony Ugoh, and tight end Dallas Clark missed the game. In perhaps the biggest blow to the Colts, Dwight Freeney injured his left foot and was carted off the field. Three days later, it was confirmed that Freeney had suffered a season-ending Lisfranc fracture. By the end of the game, a total of nine Colts on their 53-man roster either did not play due to injury or were injured in the game. The Colts dropped to 7–2, remaining in first place in the AFC South division. Meanwhile, the Chargers moved to 5–4 and clear first in the AFC West.

Scoring Summary

- 1st quarter
  - SD – Darren Sproles 89 yard kickoff return (Kaeding kick), 14:47. Chargers 7–0.
  - SD – Nate Kaeding 33 yard field goal, 7:17. Chargers 10–0. Drive: 9 plays, 73 yards, 2:14.
  - SD – Darren Sproles 55 yard punt return (Two-point conversion attempt failed), 6:07. Chargers 16–0.
- 2nd quarter
  - SD – LaDainian Tomlinson 4 yard run (Kaeding kick), 8:51. Chargers 23–0. Drive: 12 plays, 45 yards, 5:31.
  - IND – Reggie Wayne 8 yard pass from Peyton Manning (Vinatieri kick), 2:47. Chargers 23–7. Drive: 12 plays, 67 yards, 6:05.
- 3rd quarter
  - No Scoring Plays
- 4th quarter
  - IND – Kenton Keith 7 yard pass from Peyton Manning (Manning to Fletcher), 14:51. Chargers 23–15. Drive: 12 plays, 90 yards, 5:28.
  - IND – Gary Brackett fumble recovery (Two-point conversion attempt failed), 14:38. Chargers 23–21.

=== Week 11: vs. Kansas City Chiefs ===
Quarter	1	2	3	4	Total
Chiefs	0	3	7	0	10
Colts	0	3	7	3	13

at RCA Dome, Indianapolis, Indiana

- Game time: 1:00 p.m. EST/12:00 p.m. CST
- Game weather: Game played indoors (Domed stadium)
- Game attendance: 57,294
- Referee: Terry McAulay
- TV announcers (CBS): Gus Johnson (play-by-play) and Steve Tasker (color commentator)

Game Summary
Facing second year quarterback Brodie Croyle, the Colts struggled in the game's first quarter, as Adam Vinatieri continued a slump of missed field goal tries with a miss from 49 yards out. The Chiefs also struggled on field goal tries with two misses in the first half before finally connecting for a 3–0 lead. The Colts tied the game late in the first half on a 27-yarder from Vinatieri, then pounced to a 10–3 third quarter lead. The Chiefs tied the game at 10–10 when the Colts orchestrated a time-consuming fourth quarter drive before the winning field goal by Vinatieri in the game's final seconds.

The win put the Colts at 8–2 and still in command of the AFC South.

Scoring Summary

- 1st quarter
  - No Scoring Plays
- 2nd quarter
  - KC – Dave Rayner 47 yard field goal, 8:55. Chiefs 3–0. Drive: 4 plays, 8 yards, 2:02.
  - IND – Adam Vinatieri 27 yard field goal, 1:18. Tied 3–3. Drive: 4 plays, 4 yards, 1:22.
- 3rd quarter
  - IND – Joseph Addai 3 yard run (Vinatieri kick), 7:17. Colts 10–3. Drive: 9 plays, 64 yards, 4:53.
  - KC – Dwayne Bowe 19 yard pass from Brodie Croyle (Rayner kick), 1:22. Tied 10–10. Drive: 11 plays, 77 yards, 5:55.
- 4th quarter
  - IND – Adam Vinatieri 24 yard field goal, 0:03. Colts 13–10. Drive: 14 plays, 61 yards, 6:56.

=== Week 12: at Atlanta Falcons ===
Quarter	1	2	3	4	Total
Colts	0	21	10	0	31
Falcons	10	3	0	0	13

at Georgia Dome, Atlanta, Georgia

- Game time: 8:15 p.m. EST/7:15 p.m. CST
- Game weather: Game played indoors (Domed stadium)
- Game attendance: 69,845
- Referee: Mike Carey
- TV announcers (NFL Network): Bryant Gumbel (play-by-play) and Cris Collinsworth (color commentator)

Game Summary
Coming off of their home win against Kansas City, from just 4 days previous, the Colts traveled to Atlanta for a Thanksgiving game against Falcons. Colts rookie wide receiver Anthony Gonzalez returned to the lineup from an injury and he proved to be very beneficial for the Colts, he finished with 105 yards on 6 catches. The Falcons jumped out to an early 10–0 lead with a Morten Andersen field goal and touchdown pass to Roddy White. However, the Colts would respond with a touchdown pass of their own to Reggie Wayne cutting the Atlanta lead to only three early in the second quarter. They would then take the lead on a touchdown pass to tight end Dallas Clark. They would add another touchdown before the half and took a 21–13 lead into halftime. In the second half the Colts would cruise to victory by adding a Joseph Addai rushing touchdown and Adam Vinatieri field goal to make the final score 31–13.

With the victory the Colts moved to 9–2 and still in command of the AFC South. The Colts had 11 days off until next week's big divisional showdown against the Jacksonville Jaguars with 1st place in the division once again on the line. The Colts are 13–1 in their history against the Falcons.

Wayne (5 receptions for 66 yards and 1 TD) was given NFL Network's inaugural Pudding Pie Award for his efforts.

Scoring Summary

- 1st quarter
  - ATL – Morten Andersen 34 yard field goal, 6:59. Falcons 3–0. Drive: 19 plays, 63 yards, 8:01.
  - ATL – Roddy White 48 yard pass from Joey Harrington (Andersen kick), 3:44. Falcons 10–0. Drive: 3 plays, 56 yards, 1:47.
- 2nd quarter
  - IND – Reggie Wayne 23 yard pass from Peyton Manning (Vinatieri kick), 14:42. Falcons 10–7. Drive: 3 plays, 43 yards, 0:28.
  - ATL – Morten Andersen 30 yard field goal, 11:35. Falcons 13–7. Drive: 6 plays, 29 yards, 3:07.
  - IND – Dallas Clark 8 yard pass from Peyton Manning (Vinatieri kick), 6:45. Colts 14–13. Drive: 10 plays, 72 yards, 4:50.
  - IND – Ben Utecht 5 yard pass from Peyton Manning (Vinatieri kick), 2:38. Colts 21–13. Drive: 4 plays, 48 yards, 1:29.
- 3rd quarter
  - IND – Joseph Addai 4 yard run (Vinatieri kick), 5:05. Colts 28–13. Drive: 7 plays, 54 yards, 3:13.
  - IND – Adam Vinatieri 24 yard field goal, 0:32. Colts 31–13. Drive: 6 plays, 18 yards, 2:07.
- 4th quarter
  - No Scoring Plays

=== Week 13: vs. Jacksonville Jaguars ===
Quarter	1	2	3	4	Total
Jaguars	0	7	7	11	25
Colts	14	7	0	7	28

at RCA Dome, Indianapolis, Indiana

- Game time: 1:00 p.m. EST/12:00 p.m. CST
- Game weather: Game played indoors (Domed stadium)
- Game attendance: 57,302
- Referee: Terry McAulay
- TV announcers (CBS): Jim Nantz (play-by-play) and Phil Simms (color commentator)

Game Summary
Coming off their Thanksgiving road win over the Falcons, the Colts went home for a Week 13 AFC South rematch with the Jacksonville Jaguars. In the first quarter, Indianapolis scored first with QB Peyton Manning completing a 5-yard TD pass to TE Dallas Clark, along with a 48-yard TD pass to WR Reggie Wayne. In the second quarter, the Jaguars got on the board with RB Maurice Jones-Drew getting a 2-yard TD run. Afterwards, the Colts replied with Manning and Clark hooking up with each other again on a 14-yard TD pass.

In the third quarter, Jacksonville tried to come back as QB David Garrard completed a 2-yard TD pass to TE Marcedes Lewis for the only score of the period. In the fourth quarter, the Jaguars drew closer as kicker Josh Scobee nailed a 47-yard field goal. However, the Colts responded with Manning completing a 1-yard TD pass to RB Luke Lawton. Afterwards, Jacksonville tried to come back as Garrard completed a 17-yard TD pass to WR Dennis Northcutt (along with getting the 2-point conversion run). Indianapolis' defense managed to seal the deal.

With their season-sweep over the Jaguars, the Colts improved to 10–2.

During the game, the Colts gave Garrard his first interception of the year, courtesy of Safety Antoine Bethea.

Scoring Summary

- 1st quarter
  - IND – Dallas Clark 5 yard pass from Peyton Manning (Vinatieri kick), 9:30. Colts 7–0. Drive: 3 plays, 11 yards, 0:41.
  - IND – Reggie Wayne 48 yard pass from Peyton Manning (Vinatieri kick), :31. Colts 14–0. Drive: 8 plays, 63 yards, 3:25.
- 2nd quarter
  - JAC – Maurice Jones-Drew 2 yard run (Scobee kick), 5:21. Colts 14–7. Drive: 16 plays, 84 yards, 11:10.
  - IND – Dallas Clark 14 yard pass from Peyton Manning (Vinatieri kick), 0:06. Colts 21–7. Drive: 14 plays, 80 yards, 5:15.
- 3rd quarter
  - JAC – Marcedes Lewis 2 yard pass from David Garrard (Scobee kick), 8:06. Colts 21–14. Drive: 12 plays, 69 yards, 6:54.
- 4th quarter
  - JAC – Josh Scobee 47 yard field goal, 11:36. Colts 21–17. Drive: 13 plays, 38 yards, 6:40.
  - IND – Luke Lawton 1 yard pass from Peyton Manning (Vinatieri kick), 8:26. Colts 28–17. Drive: 7 plays, 63 yards, 3:10.
  - JAC – Dennis Northcutt 17 yard pass from David Garrard (Garrard run), 2:47. Colts 28–25. Drive: 8 plays, 78 yards, 3:01.

=== Week 14: at Baltimore Ravens ===
Quarter	1	2	3	4	Total
Colts	23	14	7	0	44
Ravens	0	7	0	13	20

at M&T Bank Stadium, Baltimore, Maryland

- Game time: 8:15 p.m. EST/7:15 p.m. CST
- Game weather: 40 °F (4 °C) (Partly Cloudy Skies w/Rain)
- Game attendance: 70,513
- Referee: Walt Coleman
- TV announcers (NBC): Al Michaels (play-by-play) and John Madden (color commentator)

Game summary
Coming off their season-sweep over the Jaguars, the Colts flew to M&T Bank Stadium for a Week 14 Sunday Night duel with the Baltimore Ravens, in the rematch of last year's AFC Divisional duel. In the first quarter, Indianapolis got onto the scoreboard first with QB Peyton Manning completing a 34-yard TD pass to WR Reggie Wayne, while RB Joseph Addai got a 1-yard TD run. Afterwards, Manning and Addai hooked up with each other on a 19-yard TD pass, while rookie CB Michael Coe blocked a punt, causing it go through the back of Baltimore's end zone for a safety. In the second quarter, Addai made an 11-yard TD run. The Ravens immediately responded as WR Yamon Figurs returned a kickoff 94 yards for a touchdown, yet Indianapolis continued its run with Manning completing a 57-yard TD pass to rookie WR Anthony Gonzalez.

In the third quarter, the Colts put the game away with Manning finding Gonzalez again on a 40-yard TD pass for the only score of the period. In the fourth quarter, Baltimore tried a feeble comeback as QB Kyle Boller completed a 4-yard TD pass to WR Devard Darling, while QB Troy Smith got a 6-yard TD run.

With the win, not only did Indianapolis improve to 11–2, but they also clinched their 6th-straight playoff berth.

Peyton Manning even had a record night. He became the 5th player in NFL history to throw 300 career TD passes. At game's end, he ended up with 302 touchdown passes, surpassing John Elway for 4th place on the All-Time TD passes list.

Scoring summary

- 1st quarter
  - IND – Reggie Wayne 34 yard pass from Peyton Manning (Vinatieri kick), 11:19. Colts 7–0. Drive: 9 plays, 65 yards, 3:41.
  - IND – Joseph Addai 1 yard run (Vinatieri kick), 9:09. Colts 14–0. Drive: 2 plays, 12 yards, 0:35.
  - IND – Joseph Addai 19 yard pass from Peyton Manning (Vinatieri kick), 4:05. Colts 21–0. Drive: 1 play, 19 yards, 0:06.
  - IND – Punt blocked by Michael Coe out of bounds in end zone for a Safety, 2:04. Colts 23–0.
- 2nd quarter
  - IND – Joseph Addai 11 yard run (Vinatieri kick), 11:57. Colts 30–0. Drive: 8 plays, 65 yards, 5:00.
  - BAL – Yamon Figurs 94 yard kickoff return (Stover kick), 11:44. Colts 30–7.
  - IND – Anthony Gonzalez 57 yard pass from Peyton Manning (Vinatieri kick), 6:20. Colts 37–7. Drive: 5 plays, 68 yards, 2:16.
- 3rd quarter
  - IND – Anthony Gonzalez 40 yard pass from Peyton Manning (Vinatieri kick), 12:37. Colts 44–7. Drive: 2 plays, 41 yards, 0:52.
- 4th quarter
  - BAL – Devard Darling 4 yard pass from Kyle Boller (Two-point conversion failed), 14:10. Colts 44–13. Drive: 13 plays, 63 yards, 7:20.
  - BAL – Troy Smith 6 yard run (Stover kick), 0:59. Colts 44–20. Drive: 7 plays, 41 yards, 1:22.

=== Week 15: at Oakland Raiders ===
Quarter	1	2	3	4	Total
Colts	10	0	3	8	21
Raiders	0	7	0	7	14

at McAfee Coliseum, Oakland, California

- Game time: 4:05 p.m. EST/3:05 p.m. CST
- Game weather: 55 °F (13 °C) (Partly Cloudy)
- Game attendance: 62,000
- Referee: Gerald Austin
- TV announcers (CBS): Dick Enberg (play-by-play) & Randy Cross (color commentator)

Game summary
Coming off their Sunday night road win over the Ravens, the Colts flew to McAfee Coliseum for a Week 15 intraconference duel with the Oakland Raiders. In the first quarter, Indianapolis jumped out to an early 10–0 lead with kicker Adam Vinatieri managing to get a 22-yard field goal, while CB T.J. Rushing returned a punt 90 yards for a touchdown. In the second quarter, the Raiders got on the board with QB Josh McCown completing a 3-yard TD pass to WR Ronald Curry for the only score of the period.

In the third quarter, the Colts went back to work as Vinatieri nailed a 19-yard field goal for the only score of the period. In the fourth quarter, Oakland took the lead with RB Justin Fargas getting a 2-yard TD run. Afterwards, Indianapolis sealed the win as QB Peyton Manning completed a 20-yard TD pass to rookie WR Anthony Gonzalez.

With the win, not only did the Colts improve to 12–2, but they also clinched their 5th-straight AFC South title and became the first team in NFL history to win 12 or more games in 5 consecutive seasons. Additionally, New England's victory over the Jets earlier in the day assured the No. 2 seed for the Colts in the NFL playoffs in January.

Scoring summary

- 1st quarter
  - IND – Adam Vinatieri 22 yard field goal, 10:02. Colts 3–0. Drive: 10 plays, 65 yds, 5:02
  - IND – T.J. Rushing 90 yard punt return (Vinatieri kick), 9:01. Colts 10–0.
- 2nd quarter
  - OAK – Ronald Curry 3 yard pass from Josh McCown (Janikowski kick), 3:06. Colts 10–7. Drive: 20 plays, 99 yards, 11:49.
- 3rd quarter
  - IND – Adam Vinatieri 19 yard field goal, 8:06. Colts 13–7. Drive: 11 plays, 83 yards, 4:42.
- 4th quarter
  - OAK – Justin Fargas 2 yard run (Janikowski kick), 10:29. Raiders 14–13. Drive: 13 plays, 60 yards, 6:40.
  - IND – Anthony Gonzalez 20 yard pass from Peyton Manning (Two-point conversion good; Joseph Addai run), 4:49. Colts 21–14. Drive: 11 plays, 91 yards, 5:40.

=== Week 16: vs Houston Texans ===
Quarter	1	2	3	4	Total
Texans	7	0	0	8	15
Colts	3	21	14	0	38

at RCA Dome, Indianapolis, Indiana

- Game time: 1:00 p.m. EST/12:00 p.m. CST
- Game weather: Game played indoors (Domed stadium)
- Game attendance: 57,262
- Referee: Ed Hochuli
- TV announcers (CBS): Kevin Harlan (play-by-play) and Rich Gannon (color commentator)

Game Summary
The Colts offense produced a season high 458 yards and tied for second-most first downs in a game in franchise history with 33 with their 38–15 win over Houston. Also the Colts defense forced 3 turnovers on the day, all on interceptions by Bob Sanders, Matt Giordano, and Melvin Bullitt. The Texans jumped out early to a 7 nothing lead when Sage Rosenfels connected with Kevin Walter from 17 yards out. The Colts however would respond with 38 unanswered points including two touchdowns to Dallas Clark. The second TD to Clark gave Manning 30 on the season, the fourth time in his career he has had a 30+ TD season. in addition to Manning's achievement Clark set single-season franchise records for receptions with 57 and touchdown receptions with 11 by a Colts tight end, set by Baltimore Colt Hall-of-Famer John Mackey.

Not only did Indianapolis improve to 13–2 with the win but they have now won 10 straight home games against division opponents. The Colts will face the Tennessee Titans in the week 17 season finale on NBC Sunday Night Football.

Scoring Summary

- 1st quarter
  - HOU – Kevin Walter 17 yard pass from Sage Rosenfels (Brown kick), 11:14. Texans 7–0. Drive: 7 plays, 76 yards, 3:46.
  - IND – Adam Vinatieri 29 yard field goal, 6:55. Texans 7–3. Drive: 11 plays, 54 yards, 4:19.
- 2nd quarter
  - IND – Joseph Addai 2 yard run (Vinatieri kick), 12:08. Colts 10–7. Drive: 12 plays, 92 yards, 6:40.
  - IND – Dallas Clark 6 yard pass from Peyton Manning (Vinatieri Kick), 5:42. Colts 17–7. Drive: 8 plays, 92 yards, 4:21.
  - IND – Dallas Clark 11 yard TD pass from Peyton Manning (Vinatieri Kick), 3:39. Colts 24–7. Drive: 4 plays, 26 yards, 1:41.
- 3rd quarter
  - IND – Clifton Dawson 4 yard run (Vinatieri Kick), 10:20. Colts 31–7. Drive: 9 plays, 78 yards, 4:40.
  - IND – Reggie Wayne 7 yard pass from Peyton Manning (Vinatieri Kick), 3:08. Colts 38–7. Drive: 7 plays, 66 yards, 3:20.
- 4th quarter
  - HOU – Andre Johnson 6 yard pass from Sage Rosenfels (Two-point conversion good; Darius Walker run), 1:07. Colts 38–15. Drive: 4 plays, 31 yards, 0:37.

=== Week 17: vs. Tennessee Titans ===
Quarter	1	2	3	4	Total
Titans	7	0	3	6	16
Colts	0	3	7	0	10

at RCA Dome, Indianapolis, Indiana

- Game time: 8:15 p.m. EST/7:15 p.m. CST
- Game weather: Game played indoors (Domed stadium)
- Game attendance: 57,202
- Referee: Ron Winter
- TV announcers (NBC): Al Michaels (play-by-play) and John Madden (color commentator)

Game Summary
With nothing left to play for the Colts played host to the Tennessee Titans in the regular season finale. This was the last regular season game for the Colts in the RCA Dome. The Titans needed a win to qualify for the playoffs. The Colts starters only played 3 series and produced 3 points before the back ups came in. The Titans would strike first when Chris Brown would go in for 8 yard touchdown run. Adam Vinatieri then hit a 37-yard field goal early in the second quarter. That would be the last score of the half as the Titans led 7–3 at the break. With 9:09 left in the third quarter backup quarterback Jim Sorgi throw a 3-yard touchdown pass to Craphonso Thorpe to give the Colts a 10–7 lead. Rob Bironas would then nail 3 consecutive field goals and the Titans defense would shut the Colts out to give Tennessee a 16–10 victory. With the win the Titans made the playoffs and knocked Cleveland out of contention.

With the loss, the Colts closed out the regular season at 13–3, breaking their 6-game winning streak and their 10-game winning streak over division rivals.

Scoring Summary

- 1st quarter
  - TEN – Chris Brown 8 yard run (Bironas kick), 8:41. Titans 7–0. Drive: 11 plays, 79 yards, 6:19.
- 2nd quarter
  - IND – Adam Vinatieri 37 yard field goal, 10:40. Titans 7–3. Drive: 12 plays, 64 yards, 5:40.
- 3rd quarter
  - IND – Craphonso Thorpe 3 yard pass from Jim Sorgi (Vinatieri kick), 9:09. Colts 10–7. Drive: 4 plays, 30 yards, 1:22.
  - TEN – Rob Bironas 40 yard field goal, 1:05. Tied 10–10. Drive: 13 plays, 56 yards, 8:04.
- 4th quarter
  - TEN – Rob Bironas 54 yard field goal, 7:33. Titans 13–10. Drive: 12 plays, 58 yards, 5:38.
  - TEN – Rob Bironas 33 yard field goal, 2:56. Titans 16–10. Drive: 9 plays, 32 yards, 2:25.

== Postseason schedule ==
Week	Date	Kickoff	Opponent (seed)	Result	Record	Game site	TV	NFL Recap
Wild Card	First-round Bye							
Divisional	January 13, 2008	1:00	San Diego Chargers	24–28	0–1	RCA Dome	CBS	Recap

== Postseason results ==
=== Divisional Playoff: vs San Diego Chargers ===
Quarter	1	2	3	4	Total
Chargers	0	7	14	7	28
Colts	7	3	7	7	24

at RCA Dome, Indianapolis, Indiana

- Game time: 1:00 p.m. EST/12:00 p.m. CST
- Game weather: Game played indoors (Domed stadium)
- Game attendance: 56,950
- Referee: Gerald Austin
- TV announcers (CBS): Greg Gumbel (play-by-play), Dan Dierdorf (color commentator)

Game Summary
Despite the loss of starting quarterback Philip Rivers and running back LaDainian Tomlinson (the NFL's leading rusher during the season), San Diego still managed to defeat the defending Super Bowl champion Colts, forcing them to turn the ball over on downs twice in San Diego territory in the final minutes of the game.

The Colts started out the game strong, driving 76 yards and scoring with Peyton Manning's 25-yard touchdown pass to tight end Dallas Clark. Then defensive back Kelvin Hayden intercepted a pass from Rivers on the Colts 24-yard line and the Colts moved the ball to the San Diego 40-yard line. However, Indianapolis receiver Marvin Harrison, playing in his first game back from an injury in nearly 3 months, fumbled the ball while being tackled by Antonio Cromartie, and defensive back Marlon McCree recovered it. Following the turnover, San Diego drove 78 yards and tied the game with Rivers' 14-yard touchdown pass to Vincent Jackson. Manning responded by completing 3 passes for 42 yards on a 44-yard drive that ended with an Adam Vinatieri field goal to give the Colts a 10–7 lead. Both teams blew scoring opportunities on their next drives. First the Chargers drove to the Indianapolis 31-yard line, only to have Nate Kaeding miss a 48-yard field goal. Then the Colts advanced to the Chargers 35-yard line, but on their last play of the half, Manning's pass was intercepted by Cromartie. Cromartie's 89-yard touchdown return was called back by a holding penalty, but he managed to prevent the Colts from scoring and it remained 10–7 at halftime.

The Chargers took the second half kickoff and quickly took the lead with a 30-yard touchdown catch from Chris Chambers. Once again the Colts drove into Chargers territory, moving the ball all the way to the San Diego 4-yard line. But on third down and 3, Manning's pass was intercepted by Eric Weddle. However, the Chargers could only move the ball to their own 6-yard line and T. J. Rushing returned their punt 12-yards to midfield. This time the Colts drove 50 yards and scored with Manning's 9-yard touchdown pass to Reggie Wayne. Wayne was initially ruled out of bounds at the 7, but a Colts challenge showed he remained in bounds on the way to the touchdown, and the Colts took the lead, 17–14. On the Chargers ensuing drive, Rivers threw a 22-yard completion to Chambers and followed it up with a 56-yard pass to running back Darren Sproles, a special teams returner who was brought in on offense as an extra receiver.

With 10:50 left in the fourth quarter, Indianapolis retook the lead with Manning's 55-yard touchdown pass to Anthony Gonzalez, who caught the ball along the left sideline and narrowly managed to keep his feet in bounds en route to a score, which was upheld after a Chargers challenge. But San Diego, now led by second-string quarterback Billy Volek, drove 78 yards in 8 plays and scored with Volek's 1-yard touchdown run, giving them a 28–24 lead with 4:50 left in regulation. Manning led the Colts down the field, moving the ball 70 yards and converting a 4th down and 5 with a 16-yard completion to Clark. But he threw three consecutive incompletions from the Chargers 7-yard line, turning the ball over on downs. Indianapolis' defense managed to force a punt, but the Colts turned the ball over on downs again with 53 seconds left and San Diego ran out the rest of the clock.

It was the Colts' third consecutive loss to the Chargers and Peyton Manning's seventh loss in fourteen postseason games. The Colts also fell to 0–4 in playoff games played in years where they had a first-round bye.

Scoring summary

- 1st quarter
  - IND – Dallas Clark 25 yd TD pass from Peyton Manning (Vinatieri kick), 9:13. Colts 7–0. Drive: 9 plays, 76 yards, 5:47.
- 2nd quarter
  - SD – Vincent Jackson 14 yd TD pass from Philip Rivers (Kaeding kick), 8:38. Tied 7–7. Drive: 10 plays, 78 yards, 7:16.
  - IND – Adam Vinatieri 47 yd field goal, 5:10. Colts 10–7. Drive: 8 plays, 44 yards, 3:28.
- 3rd quarter
  - SD – Chris Chambers 30 yd TD pass from Philip Rivers (Kaeding kick), 11:33. Chargers 14–10. Drive: 6 plays, 83 yards, 3:27.
  - IND – Reggie Wayne 9 yd TD pass from Peyton Manning (Vinatieri kick), 2:53. Colts 17–14. Drive: 5 plays, 50 yards, 3:02.
  - SD – Darren Sproles 56 yd TD pass from Philip Rivers (Kaeding kick), 0:00. Chargers 21–17. Drive: 5 plays, 74 yards, 2:53.
- 4th quarter
  - IND – Anthony Gonzalez 55 yd TD pass from Peyton Manning (Vinatieri kick), 10:07. Colts 24–21. Drive: 3 plays, 56 yards, 0:43.
  - SD – Billy Volek 1 yd TD run (Kaeding kick), 4:50. Chargers 28–24. Drive: 8 plays, 78 yards, 5:17.

== Pro Bowl and All-Pro players ==
The Colts had six players elected to the 2008 Pro Bowl. Three of them were selected as starters, WR Reggie Wayne, C Jeff Saturday, and S Bob Sanders. Three other Colts were named to the reserve team; QB Peyton Manning, RB Joseph Addai, and S Antoine Bethea. This was Peyton Manning's eighth straight Pro Bowl trip and Joseph Addai's first. On January 25, 2008 Steelers safety Troy Polamalu decided to skip the Pro Bowl and Colts safety Antoine Bethea was selected to replace Polamalu. The 2008 Pro Bowl was played February 10, 2008, in Honolulu, Hawaii at Aloha Stadium.

All three of the Colts that were selected to start the Pro Bowl were either selected as first or second team All-Pro. Both Jeff Saturday and Bob Sanders were named to the first team while Reggie Wayne was named to the second team.

== See also ==
- History of the Indianapolis Colts
- Indianapolis Colts seasons
- Colts-Patriots rivalry
