= Antoine Bethea =

American football player (born 1984)

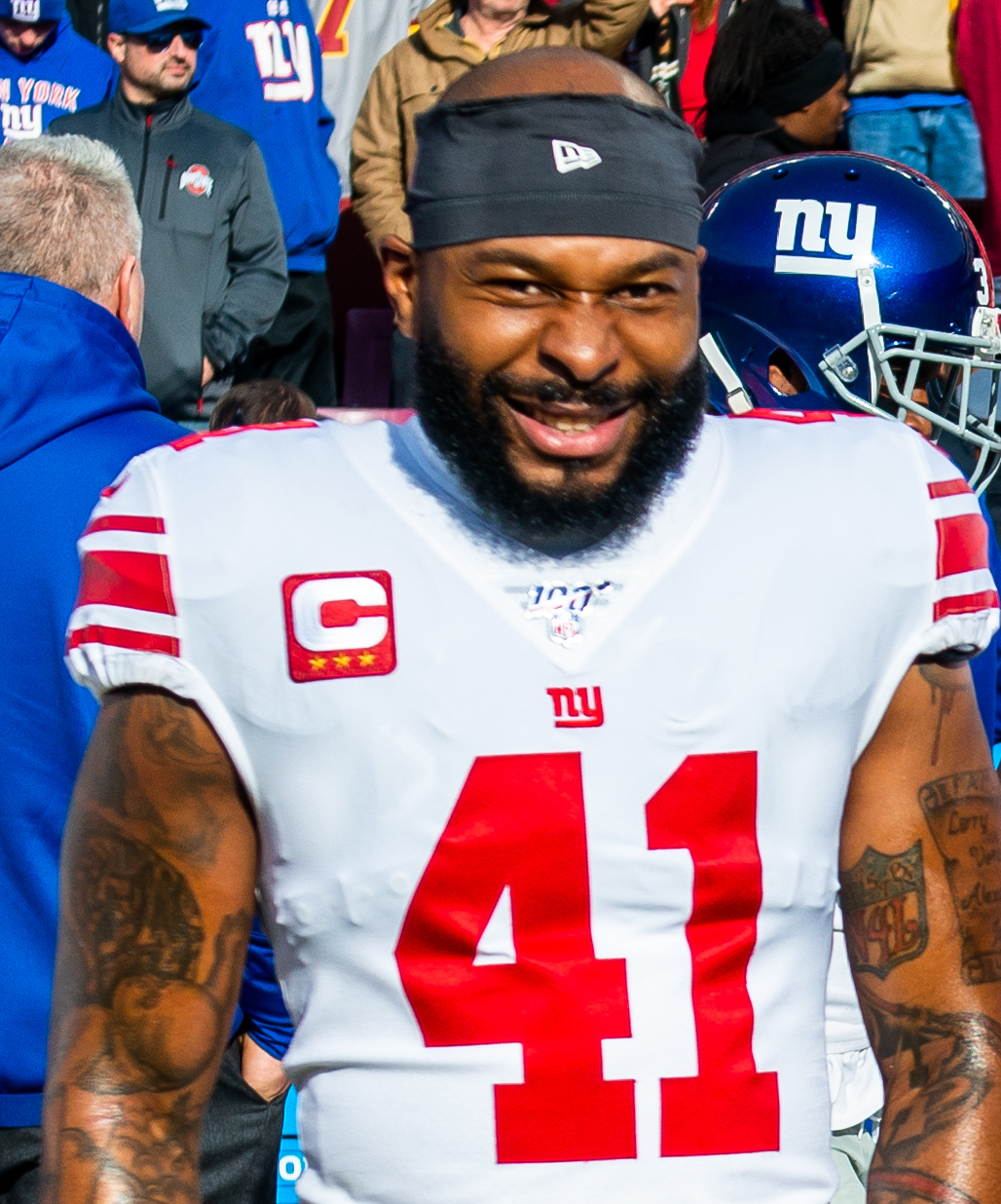
- Bethea with the New York Giants in 2019

No. 41
- Position: Safety

Personal information
- Born: July 27, 1984 (age 42); Savannah, Georgia, U.S.
- Listed height: 5 ft 11 in (1.80 m)
- Listed weight: 201 lb (91 kg)

Career information
- High school: Denbigh (Newport News, Virginia)
- College: Howard (2002–2005)
- NFL draft: 2006: 6th round, 207th overall pick

Career history
- Indianapolis Colts (2006–2013); San Francisco 49ers (2014–2016); Arizona Cardinals (2017–2018); New York Giants (2019)

Awards and highlights
- Super Bowl champion (XLI); 3× Pro Bowl (2007, 2009, 2014); Black College Football Hall of Fame Pro Player of the Year (2017); Black College Football Pro Player of the Year Award (2018)

Career NFL statistics
- Total tackles: 1,334
- Sacks: 9.5
- Forced fumbles: 9
- Pass deflections: 80
- Interceptions: 25
- Defensive touchdowns: 1
- Stats at Pro Football Reference

Antoine Akeem Bethea (/bəˈθeɪ/; born July 27, 1984) is an American former professional football player who was a safety for 14 seasons in the National Football League (NFL). He played college football for the Howard Bison and was selected by the Indianapolis Colts in the sixth round of the 2006 NFL draft. Bethea also played for the San Francisco 49ers, Arizona Cardinals, and New York Giants. He was selected for the Pro Bowl three times and won Super Bowl XLI as a member of the Colts, beating the Chicago Bears.

== College career ==
Bethea attended Howard University, where he majored in administration of justice, and played for the Howard Bison football team. He started 31 of 37 games at safety. His freshman year, he saw action in five games as a backup in the secondary collecting 13 total tackles. He would have a career-best 109 total tackles his sophomore year while seeing action as a starter in 10 of 11 games that year. That year, he had three games where he tallied 13 tackles and another game against Bethune-Cookman where he made 14 tackles. He ended that year also adding one sack, three forced fumbles, two fumble recoveries, six pass deflections and a blocked kick.

He would record three interceptions his junior year, along with two sacks, four forced fumbles and eight pass deflections in 11 starts. Ending the year with 99 total tackles and two sacks, Bethea would earn All-Mid-Eastern Conference honors and selection to the American Urban Radio Network Sheridan Broadcasting Network Black College All-American Team joining the likes of NFL greats such as former Houston Oilers/Tennessee Titans quarterback and NFL MVP Steve McNair and NFL tight end, Shannon Sharpe. He would earn these honors three years in a row.

Bethea would continue his success in his senior season, collecting 88 tackles, six passes defensed and a career-high four interceptions in 10 games. This would mark the third straight year he would lead his team in tackles. His senior season performance would earn him 1st-Team All-America honors from the NFL Draft Report.

As a three-year starter at Howard, Bethea made 309 stops that included 187 solo tackles and twelve for a loss, seven forced fumbles, two fumble recoveries, 18 passes defensed and seven interceptions. He also returned two recoveries for a touchdown: one coming on a blocked kick and the other on a fumble recovery, both returned 26 yards.

== Professional career ==
Bethea was projected to be a third- or fourth-round pick by the majority of NFL draft experts and scouts. He was ranked as the sixth best free safety prospect in the draft by DraftScout.com and was ranked the 17th best safety in the draft by ESPN Scouts Inc.

Pre-draft measurables
Height	Weight	Arm length	Hand span	40-yard dash	10-yard split	20-yard split	20-yard shuttle	Three-cone drill	Vertical jump	Broad jump	Bench press
5 ft 11 in (1.80 m)	203 lb (92 kg)	30 5/8 in (0.78 m)	9 1/8 in (0.23 m)	4.44 s	1.54 s	2.57 s	4.11 s	6.99 s	36.5 in (0.93 m)	10 ft 7 in (3.23 m)	19 reps
All values from NFL Combine

=== Indianapolis Colts ===
The Indianapolis Colts selected Bethea in the sixth round (207th overall) of the 2006 NFL draft. Bethea was the 21st safety drafted in 2006.

==== 2006 ====
On July 30, 2006, the Indianapolis Colts signed Bethea to a four-year, $1.67 million contract that includes a signing bonus of $79,420.

Throughout training camp, Bethea competed to be the starting free safety against Mike Doss and Matt Giordano. Head coach Tony Dungy named Bethea the starting free safety to begin the regular season, alongside strong safety Bob Sanders.

He made his professional regular season debut and first career start in the Indianapolis Colts' season-opener at the New York Giants and recorded six combined tackles and a pass deflection in their 26–21 victory. In Week 3, he collected a season-high 12 combined tackles (eight solo) and broke up a pass in the Colts' 21–14 win against the Jacksonville Jaguars. On November 5, 2006, Bethea recorded nine combined tackles, two pass deflections, and intercepted a pass by Tom Brady during a 27–20 victory at the New England Patriots in Week 9. He was inactive during the Colts' Week 13 loss at the Tennessee Titans due to an injury. The following week, he aggravated his shoulder injury and subsequently missed the Colts' Week 15 victory against the Cincinnati Bengals. The Indianapolis Colts' safeties sustained numerous injuries throughout the regular season, including strong safety Bob Sanders, who sustained a knee injury and was limited to four games. Veteran Mike Doss tore his ACL in Week 7 and missed the last nine games after being placed on injured reserve. Bethea started the first ten games and began developing a reputation for delivering big hits over the middle. His performance placed him in line as a possible rookie of the year candidate. He finished his rookie season with 90 combined tackles (66 solo), four pass deflections, and an interception in 14 games and 14 starts.

The Indianapolis Colts finished first in the AFC South with a 12–4 record. On January 6, 2007, Bethea started in his first career playoff game and recorded three solo tackles, a pass deflection, and intercepted a pass by quarterback Trent Green in the Colts' 23–8 victory against the Kansas City Chiefs in the AFC Wildcard Game. The following week, he collected six combined tackles, broke up a pass, and intercepted a pass attempt by Steve McNair during a 15–6 win at the Baltimore Ravens in the AFC Divisional Round. The Indianapolis Colts went on to defeat the New England Patriots 38–34 in the AFC Championship to reach Super Bowl XLI. On February 4, 2007, Bethea started in Super Bowl XLI and made four combined tackles as they defeated the Chicago Bears 29–17.

==== 2007 ====
Bethea entered training camp slated as the starting free safety. Defensive coordinator Ron Meeks retained Bethea and Bob Sanders as the starting safeties to begin the regular season.

On September 30, 2007, Bethea collected seven solo tackles during a 38–20 victory against the Denver Broncos in Week 4. The following week, he collected a season-high seven combined tackles, a pass deflection, and an interception in the Colts' 33–14 victory against the Tampa Bay Buccaneers in Week 5. In Week 8, Bethea made a season-high three pass deflections, five combined tackles, and an interception during a 31–7 victory against the Carolina Panthers. Bethea missed the last three games of the regular season due to a knee injury (Weeks 15–17). He finished his second season with 65 combined tackles (43 solo), eight pass deflections, and four interceptions in 13 games and 13 starts. The Indianapolis Colts finished atop their division with a 12–4 record. On January 13, 2008, Bethea started in the AFC Divisional Round and recorded seven combined tackles during a 28–24 loss to the San Diego Chargers. On January 28, 2008, it was reported that Bethea would be playing in the 2008 Pro Bowl. He was originally chosen as a second alternate and was needed after injuries to safeties Troy Polamalu and Bob Sanders.

==== 2008 ====
Bethea and Sanders remained the starting safeties to begin the regular season. On November 2, 2008, Bethea recorded a season-high ten solo tackles during an 18–15 victory against the New England Patriots in Week 9. The following week, he collected a season-high 11 combined tackles (six solo) in the Colts' 24–20 win at the Pittsburgh Steelers in Week 10. He finished the season with 101 combined tackles (74 solo), four pass deflections, and two interceptions in 16 games and 16 starts.

==== 2009 ====
On January 12, 2009, head coach Tony Dungy retired ending Bethea's three-year tenure under him. Assistant head coach Jim Caldwell retained Bethea as the starting strong safety, along with free safety Bob Sanders.

On September 21, 2009, Bethea collected a season-high eight solo tackles, a pass deflection, and an intercepted a pass by Tarvaris Jackson during a 27–23 victory at the Miami Dolphins in Week 2. In Week 7, he tied his season-high of eight solo tackles as the Colts' routed the St. Louis Rams 42–6. On November 8, 2009, Bethea collected a season-high nine combined tackles (four solo) during a 20–17 win against the Houston Texans in Week 9. He finished the 2009 season with 95 combined tackles (70 solo), five pass deflections, and four interceptions in 16 games and 16 starts. On December 29, 2009, it was announced that Bethea was voted to the 2010 Pro Bowl, marking the second selection of his career.

The Indianapolis Colts finished first in the AFC South with a 14–2 record, clinching a first round bye and home-field advantage. On January 16, 2010, Bethea recorded three combined tackles, two pass deflections, and intercepted a pass by Joe Flacco during a 20–3 victory against the Baltimore Ravens in the AFC Divisional Round. The Colts went on to defeat the New York Jets 30–17 in the AFC Championship to reach Super Bowl XLIV. On February 7, 2010, Bethea started in Super Bowl XLIV and made four solo tackles during a 31–17 loss to the New Orleans Saints.

==== 2010 ====
On March 3, 2010, the Indianapolis Colts placed a first round, $2.51 million tender on Bethea. He held out of organized team activities and declined to sign their restricted free agent tender. On July 11, 2010, the Indianapolis Colts signed Bethea to a four-year, $27 million contract that includes an $8 million signing bonus.

Defensive coordinator Larry Coyer retained Bethea and Sanders the starting safety duo to begin the 2010 regular season. Bethea started in the Indianapolis Colts season-opener at the Houston Texans and collected a 13 combined tackles (eight solo) and a pass deflection in their 34–24 loss. On November 28, 2010, Bethea made six combined tackles and was credited with half a sack on Philip Rivers in the Colts' 36–14 loss to the San Diego Chargers in Week 12. The following week, he recorded a season-high 15 combined tackles (11 solo) during a 38–35 loss to the Dallas Cowboys in Week 13. He finished with 107 combined tackles (77 solo), five pass deflections, an interception, a forced fumble, and half a sack in 16 games and 16 starts.

==== 2011 ====
Head coach Jim Caldwell named Bethea the starting free safety to begin the regular season, along with strong safety Melvin Bullitt. In Week 5, Bethea collected a season-high 12 combined tackles (six solo) in the Colts' 28–24 loss to the Kansas City Chiefs. On November 6, 2011, Bethea recorded a season-high eight solo tackles and assisted on three more tackles during their 31–7 loss to the Atlanta Falcons in Week 9. He finished the 2011 season with a career-high 139 combined tackles (80 solo), seven pass deflections, two forced fumbles, and a fumble recovery in 16 games and 16 starts.

==== 2012 ====
On January 3, 2012, Indianapolis Colts' owner Jim Irsay fired general manager Chris Polian and vice chairman Bill Polian. On January 17, 2012, new general manager Ryan Grigson decided to fire head coach Jim Caldwell after the Colts finished with a 2–14 record.

Head coach Chuck Pagano retained Bethea as the Colts' starting free safety to begin the regular season, along with strong safety Tom Zbikowski. He started in the Indianapolis Colts' season-opener at the Chicago Bears and recorded a season-high nine solo tackles and two pass deflections in their 41–21 loss. On November 8, 2012, he collected seven solo tackles and made his first career solo sack during a 27–10 victory at the Jacksonville Jaguars in Week 10. He sacked quarterback Blaine Gabbert for a one-yard loss in the fourth quarter. On December 16, 2012, Bethea made five solo tackles and sacked quarterback Matt Schaub in the Colts' 29–17 loss at the Houston Texans in Week 15. He finished the 2012 season with 100 combined tackles (75 solo), seven passes defensed, and a career-high two sacks in 16 games and 16 starts.

==== 2013 ====
Bethea entered training camp slated as the de facto starter at strong safety. Defensive coordinator Greg Manusky officially named Bethea the starting strong safety to start the regular season, opposite free safety LaRon Landry. Bethea started in the Indianapolis Colts' season-opener against the Oakland Raiders and recorded 11 combined tackles (six solo), a pass deflection, and intercepted a pass by Terrelle Pryor in their 21–17 victory. This marked his first interception since 2010. On December 8, 2013, Bethea collected a career-high 17 combined tackles (ten solo) during a 42–28 loss at the Cincinnati Bengals in Week 14. Bethea finished his last season with the Indianapolis Colts with a total of 110 combined tackles (80 solo), six pass deflections, an interception, and a sack in 16 games and 16 starts.

==== 2014 ====
Bethea became an unrestricted free agent in 2014 and drew interest from multiple teams, including the Detroit Lions, San Francisco 49ers, Philadelphia Eagles, Green Bay Packers, and Kansas City Chiefs.

=== San Francisco 49ers ===
On March 12, 2014, the San Francisco 49ers signed Bethea to a four-year, $21 million contract with $15.02 million guaranteed and a signing bonus of $5.25 million.

==== 2014 ====
Head coach Jim Harbaugh named Bethea the starting strong safety to start the 2014 season, alongside free safety Eric Reid. He started in the San Francisco 49ers' season-opener at the Dallas Cowboys and recorded six solo tackles and a pass deflection in their 28–17 victory. In Week 10, Bethea collected a season-high eight combined tackles, broke up a pass, and intercepted a pass by Drew Brees during a 27–24 overtime victory at the New Orleans Saints. On December 20, 2014, Bethea recorded a season-high tying eight combined tackles, two pass deflections, and returned an interception by Philip Rivers for a 49-yard touchdown during a 38–35 overtime loss to the San Diego Chargers in Week 16. His touchdown occurred in the second quarter and marked the first score of his career. On December 24, 2014, it was announced that Bethea was selected to be an alternate for the 2015 Pro Bowl. On December 28, 2014, it was announced that the San Francisco 49ers and head coach Jim Harbaugh decided to mutually part ways after the 2014 season. He finished his first season in San Francisco with 86 combined tackles (72 solo), ten pass deflections, four interceptions, a forced fumble, and a touchdown in 16 games and 16 starts.

On January 19, 2015, Bethea was selected to replace Kam Chancellor in the 2015 Pro Bowl. Chancellor was unable to play due to this participation in the Super Bowl with the Seattle Seahawks.

==== 2015 ====
Bethea and Eric Reid entered training camp slated as the starting safeties by defensive coordinator Vic Fangio. The San Francisco 49ers' new head coach Jim Tomsula officially named Bethea and Reid the starters entering the regular season. In Week 5, Bethea collected a season-high ten combined tackles (six solo) and a pass deflection during a 30–27 loss at the New York Giants. On October 22, 2015, Bethea made five combined tackles before exiting a 20–3 loss to the Seattle Seahawks in the third quarter with an injury. The following day, the San Francisco 49ers placed him on injured reserve with a torn pectoral muscle. Bethea finished the 2015 season with a total of 44 combined tackles (32 solo), two passes defensed, and an interception in seven games and seven starts.

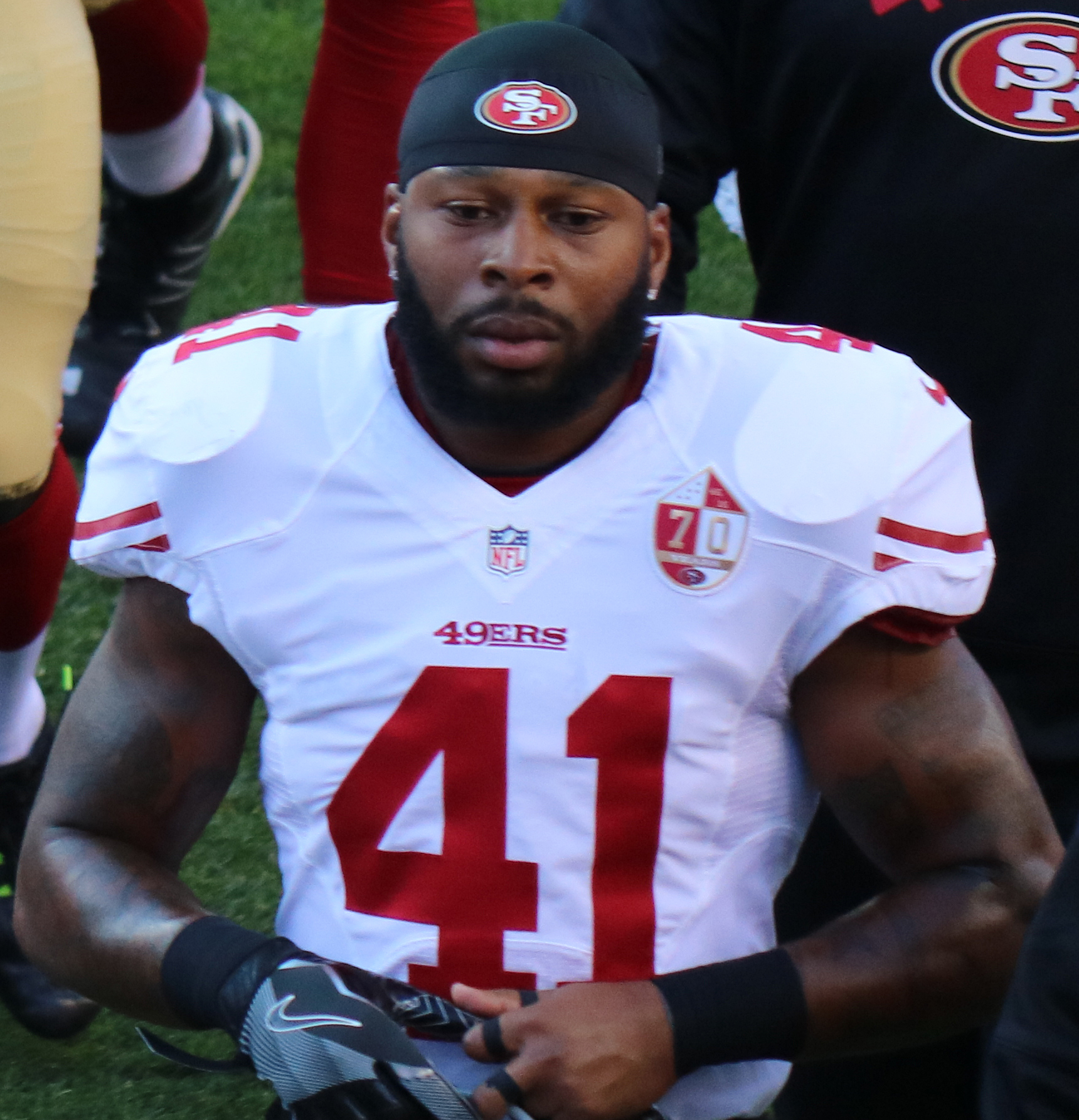
Bethea playing for the 49ers in 2016.

==== 2016 ====
On January 4, 2016, the San Francisco 49ers fired head coach Jim Tomsula after they finished 2015 with a 5–11 record. The San Francisco 49ers hired former Philadelphia Eagles' head coach Chip Kelly as their head coach for the 2016 season. This became Bethea's fourth different coach in the last four seasons. Head coach Chip Kelly retained Bethea and Eric Reid as the starting safety tandem to start the regular season. On September 18, 2016, Bethea recorded nine combined tackles, a pass deflection, and intercepted a pass by quarterback Cam Newton in a 45–27 loss at the Carolina Panthers in Week 2. In Week 4, he collected a season-high 12 combined tackles (11 solo) and broke up a pass during a 24–17 loss to the Baltimore Ravens. Bethea started all 16 games in 2016 recording 110 combined tackles (96 solo), three passes defensed, one forced fumble, and an interception in 16 games and 16 starts. Pro Football Focus gave Bethea an overall grade of 72.5 and ranked 66th among the 88 qualifying safeties in 2016.

On January 1, 2017, the 49ers announced the firing of head coach Chip Kelly after the team finished with a 2–14 record. On March 7, 2017, the 49ers granted Bethea's request to be released.

=== Arizona Cardinals ===
==== 2017 ====
On March 9, 2017, the Arizona Cardinals signed Bethea to a three-year, $12.75 million contract] that includes $4 million guaranteed and a signing bonus of $2 million.

Throughout training camp, Bethea competed against Tyvon Branch to be the starting strong safety. Head coach Bruce Arians named him the backup free safety behind Tyvon Branch to start the regular season.

On October 15, 2017, Bethea recorded five combined tackles, a pass deflection, and intercepted a pass by quarterback Jameis Winston during a 38–33 victory against the Tampa Bay Buccaneers in Week 6. The interception marked his third consecutive game with a pick. The following week, he collected a season-high 11 combined tackles (ten solo) and a pass deflection in the Cardinals' 33–0 loss at the Los Angeles Rams in Week 7. He was surpassed on the depth chart by rookie first-round pick Budda Baker after Tyvon Branch was placed on injured reserve for the remainder of the season. Bethea remained the backup strong safety behind Baker for the remainder of the season. On December 24, 2017, Bethea made three solo tackles, two pass deflections, and intercepted two pass attempts by Eli Manning in a 23–0 win against the New York Giants in Week 16. On December 26, 2017, the Arizona Cardinals placed Bethea on injured reserve after he tore his pectoral a muscle in Week 16. He completed the 2017 season with 57 combined tackles (47 solo), nine pass deflections, a career-high five interceptions, and a sack in 15 games and six starts. Pro Football Focus gave Bethea an overall grade of 86.7, which was the 13th highest grade among all qualifying safeties in 2017.

==== 2018 ====
On January 2, 2018, head coach Bruce Arians announced his retirement and resigned as head coach of the Cardinals. The Arizona Cardinals hired Steve Wilks who became Bethea's sixth head coach in as many seasons. He was named the Cardinals starting free safety, starting in all 16 games. He finished the season with a team-leading 120 tackles, four pass deflections, and a career-high three sacks.

On March 8, 2019, Bethea was released by the Cardinals.

=== New York Giants ===
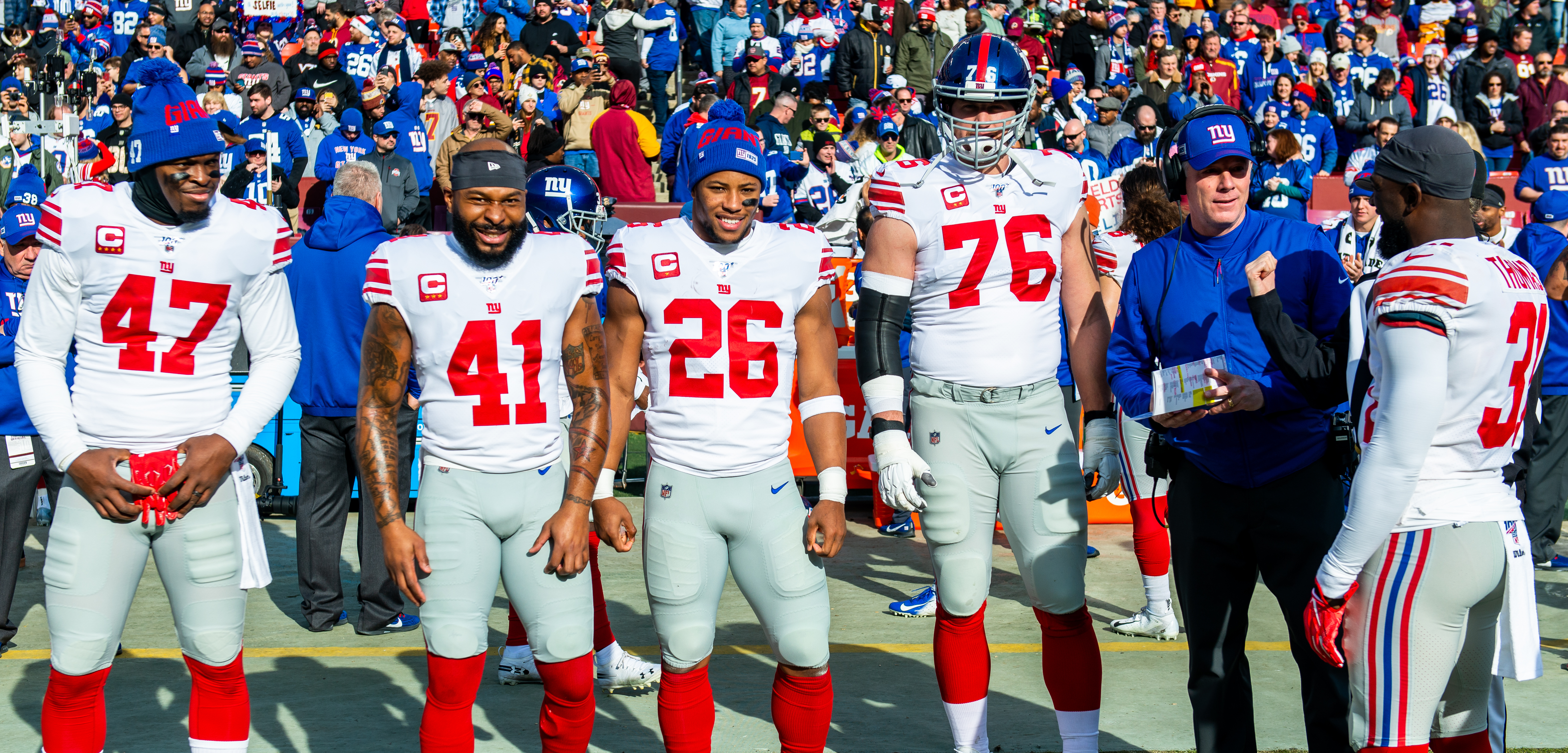
Bethea alongside other Giants' team captains in a game against the Washington Redskins

On March 14, 2019, Bethea signed with the New York Giants. In week 8 against the Detroit Lions, Bethea forced a fumble on wide receiver Kenny Golladay and recovered the football in the 31–26 loss. In week 9 on Monday night football against the Dallas Cowboys, Bethea intercepted a pass from Dak Prescott on the first play of the game and recovered a fumble forced by teammate Jabrill Peppers on Randall Cobb in the 37–18 loss.

On March 18, 2020, the Giants informed Bethea that they would not exercise his contract option, making him a free agent. On January 7, 2021, Bethea announced his retirement, after playing for 14 seasons in the NFL.

== NFL career statistics ==
Year	Team	Games		Tackles				Interceptions						Fumbles	
Year	Team	GP	GS	Cmb	Solo	Ast	Sck	PD	Int	Yds	Avg	Lng	TD	FF	FR
2006	IND	14	14	90	66	24	0.0	5	1	38	38.0	38	0	0	0
2007	IND	13	13	64	46	18	0.0	8	4	47	11.8	30	0	0	0
2008	IND	16	16	101	74	27	0.0	4	2	0	0.0	0	0	0	1
2009	IND	16	16	95	70	25	0.0	5	4	19	4.8	19	0	0	1
2010	IND	16	16	106	77	29	0.5	5	1	31	31.0	31	0	1	0
2011	IND	16	16	139	80	59	0.0	7	0	0	0.0	0	0	0	1
2012	IND	16	16	100	75	25	2.0	7	0	0	0.0	0	0	0	0
2013	IND	16	16	110	80	30	1.0	6	2	48	24.0	46	0	0	1
2014	SF	16	16	86	72	14	1.0	10	4	71	17.8	49	1	1	0
2015	SF	7	7	44	32	12	1.0	2	0	0	0.0	0	0	0	0
2016	SF	16	16	110	95	15	0.0	3	1	0	0.0	0	0	1	1
2017	ARI	15	6	57	47	10	1.0	9	5	51	10.2	21	0	1	0
2018	ARI	16	16	121	100	21	3.0	4	0	0	0.0	0	0	1	0
2019	NYG	16	16	110	81	29	0.0	6	1	7	7.0	7	0	0	2
Total		209	200	1,333	995	338	9.5	81	25	312	12.5	49	1	9	7

== Personal life ==
On July 30, 2013, Bethea's longtime college girlfriend, Samantha Romantini gave birth to a baby girl they named Siani. On June 28, 2014, Bethea married Romantini at the Ronald Reagan Building and International Trade Center in Washington D.C. The pair have since had two sons, born in 2016 and 2019.

He attended Denbigh High School in Newport News, Virginia where he was a three-year letterman in football and also lettered in basketball, where he earned all-area and All-conference honors in his senior year.

In December 2013, Bethea posed for PETA's anti-fur campaign.

In 2024, Bethea joined 51 other HBCU football alumni in endorsing Kamala Harris's campaign for president.
