= T. J. Rushing =

American football player and coach (born 1983)

Arkansas Razorbacks
- Title: Safeties coach

Personal information
- Born: June 8, 1983 (age 43); Pauls Valley, Oklahoma, U.S.
- Listed height: 5 ft 9 in (1.75 m)
- Listed weight: 186 lb (84 kg)

Career information
- High school: Pauls Valley (OK)
- College: Stanford
- NFL draft: 2006: 7th round, 238th overall pick

Career history

Playing
- Indianapolis Colts (2006–2009); Detroit Lions (2010)*; Saskatchewan Roughriders (2012)*
- * Offseason or practice squad member only

Coaching
- Arizona State (2013) Graduate assistant; Arizona State (2014) Defensive quality control coach; Northern Arizona (2015) Cornerbacks coach; Arizona State (2016–2017) Defensive backs coach; Memphis (2018–2019) Defensive backs coach; Texas A&M (2020–2023) Defensive backs coach; Auburn (2024) Special assistant to head coach; Auburn (2025) Safeties coach; Arkansas (2026-present) Defensive backs coach

Awards and highlights
- Super Bowl champion (XLI); First-team All-Pac-10 (2004); Second-team All-Pac-10 (2005)

Career NFL statistics
- Total tackles: 30
- Return yards: 1,290
- Total touchdowns: 1
- Stats at Pro Football Reference

Terrall Brent "T. J." Rushing (born June 8, 1983) is an American football coach and former player. As a player, he played as a cornerback and return specialist. He was selected by the Indianapolis Colts of the National Football League (NFL) in the seventh round of the 2006 NFL draft. He played four seasons with the team. He won a Super Bowl with Indianapolis, when the Colts defeated the Chicago Bears in Super Bowl XLI. He played college football at Stanford.

== Early life ==
Rushing attended Pauls Valley High School in Pauls Valley, Oklahoma and was a letterman in football, basketball, and track.

== College career ==
Rushing finished his Stanford career as one of the top three kick returners in school history with 1409 yards. He was named First Team All Pac-10 for his work on special teams during his junior year. Rushing had three career touchdowns on kickoff returns, including both the first and last return of his senior season.

== Professional career ==
Pre-draft measurables
Height	Weight	40-yard dash	20-yard shuttle	Three-cone drill	Vertical jump	Broad jump	Bench press
5 ft 10 3/8 in (1.79 m)	180 lb (82 kg)	4.41 s	4.34 s	7.12 s	40.0 in (1.02 m)	10 ft 0 in (3.05 m)	20 reps
All values from Pro Day

=== Indianapolis Colts ===
Rushing mainly played on special teams as a kick/punt returner for the Colts, in a career which includes one punt return touchdown against the Oakland Raiders in 2007. Rushing spent the entire 2008 season on injured reserve.

He was non-tendered as a restricted free agent following the 2009 NFL season.

=== Detroit Lions ===
Rushing signed with the Detroit Lions on August 18, 2010, and was released by the club on September 4, 2010.

=== Saskatchewan Roughriders ===
Rushing was signed by the Saskatchewan Roughriders on April 19, 2012. He was released during training camp on June 17, 2012.

== Coaching career ==
=== Arizona State University ===
Rushing was hired as a defensive backs coach for Arizona State University in 2016.

=== University of Memphis ===
Rushing was hired as the defensive backs coach for Memphis in January 2018.

=== Texas A&M University ===
Rushing was hired as the defensive backs coach for Texas A&M University in January 2020.

=== Auburn University ===
Rushing was hired as a special assistant to the head coach for Auburn University on June 20, 2024.
