= Kenton Keith =

American football player (born 1980)

No. 36, 28, 21
- Position: Running back

Personal information
- Born: July 14, 1980 (age 46); Lincoln, Nebraska, U.S.
- Listed height: 5 ft 11 in (1.80 m)
- Listed weight: 198 lb (90 kg)

Career information
- High school: Omaha Benson (Omaha, Nebraska)
- College: New Mexico State (1998–2001)
- NFL draft: 2003: undrafted

Career history
- Saskatchewan Roughriders (2003); New York Jets (2004)*; Saskatchewan Roughriders (2004–2006); Indianapolis Colts (2007); Hamilton Tiger-Cats (2008–2009); Omaha Nighthawks (2010)*
- * Offseason or practice squad member only

Awards and highlights
- West Division Most Outstanding Player (2006); 2× All-Star; Second-team All-Sun Belt (2001)

Career NFL statistics
- Rushing attempts: 121
- Rushing yards: 533
- Rushing touchdowns: 3
- Receptions: 13
- Receiving yards: 77
- Receiving touchdowns: 1
- Stats at Pro Football Reference

Kenton Jermaine Keith (born July 14, 1980) is an American former professional football player who was a running back in the National Football League (NFL) and Canadian Football League (CFL). He was signed by the Saskatchewan Roughriders CFL in 2003 and then the Indianapolis Colts of the NFL in 2007. He played college football for the New Mexico State Aggies.

Keith was also a member of the New York Jets of the NFL, Hamilton Tiger-Cats of the CFL and Omaha Nighthawks of the United Football League (UFL).

== Early life ==
Keith played high school football at Omaha Benson High School, averaging better than 28 yards per carry as a junior and better than 18 yards per carry as a senior. Keith will be inducted into his high schools Hall of Fame soon for breaking the rushing title in only two years of playing.

== College career ==
Kenton then attended New Mexico State University rushing for 2,134 yards over four seasons. Keith also led the nation in yards per carry his Junior year with an 8.5-yard average

== Professional career ==
=== Saskatchewan Roughriders ===
Keith signed with the Saskatchewan Roughriders in 2001. In four CFL seasons, he ran for more than 3,800 yards, topped 1,000 yards twice, caught 52 passes and had eight TD receptions in 2003. Keith's best CFL season came in 2004, when he gained 1,154 yards in 14 games—a number which approaches the 1,500-yard plateau over a full 18-game schedule. If you calculate his yardage from 2003 and 2005 in the same manner, neither total falls under 1,200. In the spring of 2004, he signed with New York Jets then returned to the CFL where he was a West Division All-Star in 2006.

=== Indianapolis Colts ===
Keith signed with the Indianapolis Colts in early 2007. He was a second string running back for the Indianapolis in 2007, backing up feature back Joseph Addai. Keith had his first 100-yard rushing game against the Tampa Bay Buccaneers in a 33–17 win with the Colts. Keith ran for 533 yards and scored four touchdowns as Addai's backup.

=== Hamilton Tiger-Cats ===
Keith was signed by the Hamilton Tiger-Cats on September 22, 2008. Suffered an injury to his LCL and was released.

=== Omaha Nighthawks ===
Keith was signed by the Omaha Nighthawks on June 10, 2011. This was the Lock-Out year in the NFL, then the NightHawks folded.

== Personal life ==
Kenton's father Percy Keith played college football at the University of Nebraska–Lincoln (1976–1980). Keith is also cousins with former NFL running back Roger Craig and current NFL running back Breece Hall.
