= Matt Giordano =

American football player (born 1982)

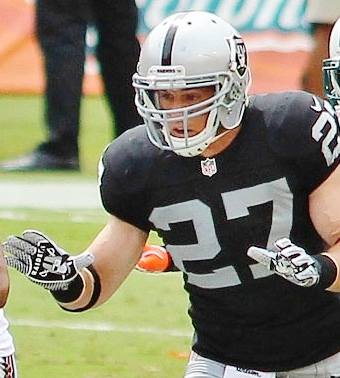
- Giordano with the Oakland Raiders

Chicago Bears
- Title: Assistant defensive backs coach Safeties

Personal information
- Born: October 16, 1982 (age 44); Fresno, California, U.S.
- Listed height: 5 ft 11 in (1.80 m)
- Listed weight: 208 lb (94 kg)

Career information
- Position: Safety (No. 43, 47, 37, 27)
- High school: Buchanan (Clovis, California)
- College: California
- NFL draft: 2005: 4th round, 134th overall pick

Career history

Playing
- Indianapolis Colts (2005−2008); Green Bay Packers (2009); Atlanta Falcons (2010)*; New Orleans Saints (2010); Oakland Raiders (2011–2012); St. Louis Rams (2013)
- * Offseason or practice squad member only

Coaching
- Buchanan High School (CA) (2015) Defensive coordinator; Buchanan High School (CA) (2016–2021) Head coach; Fresno State (2022) Volunteer assistant; New Orleans Saints (2023–2024) Assistant secondary coach; Chicago Bears (2025–present) Assistant defensive backs coach & safeties coach

Awards and highlights
- Super Bowl champion (XLI); First-team All-Pac-10 (2004); Fresno Athletic Hall of Fame

Career NFL statistics
- Total tackles: 227
- Sacks: 1
- Forced fumbles: 2
- Interceptions: 11
- Defensive touchdowns: 2
- Stats at Pro Football Reference

Head coaching record
- Career: 51–16 (high school)

Matthew Victor Giordano (born October 16, 1982) is an American former professional football safety who currently serves as the assistant defensive backs coach and safeties coach for the Chicago Bears of the National Football League (NFL). He was selected by the Indianapolis Colts in the fourth round of the 2005 NFL draft. Giordano grew up in Clovis, California, and attended Fresno City College before playing college football for the California Golden Bears.

Giordano was part of the Colts' Super Bowl XLI championship team. He was also a member of the Green Bay Packers, Atlanta Falcons, New Orleans Saints, Oakland Raiders, and St. Louis Rams.

== Early life ==
Attending Buchanan High School in Clovis, California, Giordano played a key role as team co-captain in Buchanan's inaugural Valley championship in 2000. His football jersey number was 2 while playing for Buchanan. As a senior, he had five interceptions and 64 tackles while causing three fumbles, and averaged nine yards per carry and 12.6 yards per reception on offense. He broke Buchanan records for longest punt return for a touchdown, most blocked kicks and most interceptions in a game. He was a two-time all-Tri-River Athletic Conference (TRAC) first-team choice and was also named the Defensive Player of the Year by the Clovis Exchange Club and Buchanan High's Most Outstanding Player in football and track in 2001. Giordano was also crowned individual league champion in the 400 meters in 1999.

== College career ==
Giordano attended Fresno City College for two years. He won All-State honors as a freshman, was a two-time All-Conference pick, and was the Defensive MVP in the Northern California Championship game.

He then played college football with the California Golden Bears, at the University of California, Berkeley. As a senior, Giordano won All-Pacific-10 Conference first-team honors, and was an All-American honorable mention. During his career, he had two interceptions, six pass deflections, one sack, 111 tackles (four for losses), two forced fumbles, and a fumble recovery. He graduated from Berkeley.

== Professional career ==
=== Indianapolis Colts ===
Pre-draft measurables
Height	Weight	40-yard dash	10-yard split	20-yard shuttle	Three-cone drill	Vertical jump	Broad jump
5 ft 10 3/4 in (1.80 m)	199 lb (90 kg)	4.48 s	1.59 s	4.17 s	6.79 s	33.0 in (0.84 m)	10 ft 0 in (3.05 m)
All values from Pro Day

The Indianapolis Colts selected Giordano in the fourth round (134th overall) of the 2005 NFL draft. Giordano played in 15 games as a rookie, starting in the September 11 game. He made 12 tackles and one pass deflected.

In 2006, his second season, Giordano played 12 games and made 25 tackles. On December 10 against the Jacksonville Jaguars, Giordano made his first career interception, of David Garrard. Giordano also deflected a pass and made nine tackles in the game. On December 18, a Monday night game against the Cincinnati Bengals, Giordano made his first professional start. The Colts won Super Bowl XLI 29–17 over the Chicago Bears on February 4, 2007. On fourth down late in the fourth quarter, Giordano deflected a pass by Rex Grossman to Desmond Clark in a play described as icing the game for Indianapolis.

Giordano started four games out of 12 played in 2007 and made 20 tackles, four passes deflected, and two interceptions. In the 41–10 victory over the New Orleans Saints, Giordano intercepted Drew Brees and returned the pick 83 yards in the Colts' final touchdown play of the game.

In 2008, Giordano played all 16 regular season games and played on special teams in the Wild Card playoff game against the San Diego Chargers. Giordano made 23 tackles and one pass deflected.

Giordano signed a one-year contract with the Colts on April 20, 2009. On September 6, the Colts released Giordano to make room for linebacker Cody Glenn.

=== Green Bay Packers ===
On September 23, 2009, the Green Bay Packers signed Giordano after releasing Aaron Rouse. With the Packers in 2009, Giordano played five games and made two tackles. He was released on March 5, 2010.

=== New Orleans Saints ===
Giordano signed with the Atlanta Falcons on March 16, 2010, and participated in training camp with the team before being cut on August 31. Giordano signed with the New Orleans Saints on October 12, 2010, and played nine games with three tackles. In his debut with the Saints on October 17 against the Tampa Bay Buccaneers, Giordano recovered an onside kick attempt by Tampa kicker Connor Barth in the fourth quarter in New Orleans's 31–6 victory.

=== Oakland Raiders ===
The Raiders signed Giordano on August 15, 2011, after Hiram Eugene suffered a serious hip injury in the preseason opener. He was released on September 3, but was re-signed on September 5. In the 2011–2012 season, Giordano led the team in interceptions along with his 70 tackles.

=== St. Louis Rams ===
The Rams signed Giordano on June 15, 2013, after the Rams released rookie free agent safety Don Unamba.

== NFL career statistics ==
Legend
**Bold**	Career high

=== Regular season ===
Year	Team	Games		Tackles					Interceptions					Fumbles			
Year	Team	GP	GS	Cmb	Solo	Ast	Sck	TFL	Int	Yds	TD	Lng	PD	FF	FR	Yds	TD
2005	IND	15	0	15	11	4	0.0	0	0	0	0	0	1	0	0	0	0
2006	IND	12	1	25	20	5	0.0	0	1	0	0	0	2	0	0	0	0
2007	IND	12	4	24	18	6	0.0	**1**	2	89	**1**	**83**	4	0	0	0	0
2008	IND	**16**	1	23	19	4	0.0	0	0	0	0	0	1	0	0	0	0
2009	GB	5	0	2	2	0	0.0	0	0	0	0	0	0	0	0	0	0
2010	NO	9	0	3	2	1	0.0	0	0	0	0	0	0	0	0	0	0
2011	OAK	15	9	**70**	**56**	**14**	**1.0**	**1**	**5**	**130**	0	62	**5**	**1**	0	0	0
2012	OAK	**16**	**13**	51	39	12	0.0	0	2	45	0	24	**5**	0	0	0	0
2013	STL	**16**	2	14	13	1	0.0	0	1	82	**1**	82	1	**1**	0	0	0
Career		116	30	227	180	47	1.0	2	11	346	2	83	19	2	0	0	0

=== Playoffs ===
Year	Team	Games		Tackles					Interceptions					Fumbles			
Year	Team	GP	GS	Cmb	Solo	Ast	Sck	TFL	Int	Yds	TD	Lng	PD	FF	FR	Yds	TD
2006	IND	**4**	0	**6**	**3**	**3**	0.0	0	0	0	0	0	**1**	0	0	0	0
2007	IND	1	0	0	0	0	0.0	0	0	0	0	0	0	0	0	0	0
2008	IND	1	0	0	0	0	0.0	0	0	0	0	0	0	0	0	0	0
2009	GB	1	0	1	1	0	0.0	0	0	0	0	0	0	0	0	0	0
Career		7	0	7	4	3	0.0	0	0	0	0	0	1	0	0	0	0

== Coaching career ==
In 2015, Giordano joined his high school alma mater's coaching staff as defensive coordinator. He was named to replace head coach Mike Jacot the following year. He served from 2016 to 2021 amassing a 51–16 record as head coach of Buchanan High School. He stepped down from his role as head coach following the 2021 season. He would join his former coach Jeff Tedford's staff at Fresno State as a volunteer assistant during the 2022 season. In 2023, Giordano joined the staff of the New Orleans Saints as an assistant secondary coach.

On February 20, 2025, the Chicago Bears hired Giordano to serve as their assistant defensive backs coach and safeties coach.

== Personal life ==
Giordano married his wife, Laura in 2005. His great-grandfather is Italian born Ralph Giordano, better known as Young Corbett III, a world welterweight and middleweight boxing champion. Matt is the son of Victor and Janet Giordano. After retiring from the NFL, Giordano accepted a position as a physical education teacher at Buchanan High School.
