= Luke Lawton =

American football player (born 1980)

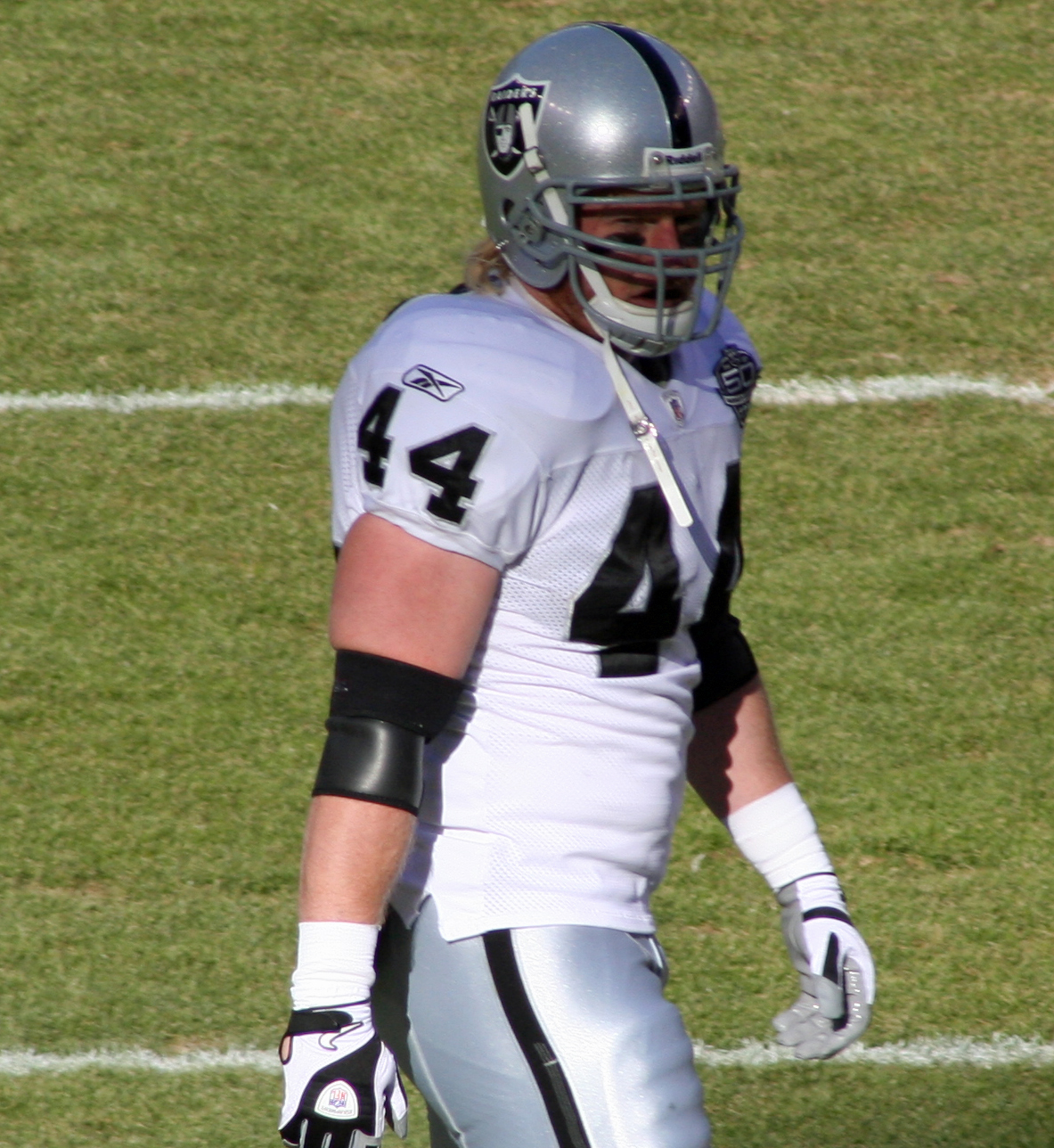

No. 44, 45
- Position: Fullback

Personal information
- Born: August 26, 1980 (age 46); New Iberia, Louisiana, U.S.
- Listed height: 5 ft 11 in (1.80 m)
- Listed weight: 237 lb (108 kg)

Career information
- College: McNeese
- NFL draft: 2004: undrafted

Career history
- Buffalo Bills (2004)*; New York Giants (2004)*; Buffalo Bills (2004)*; Atlanta Falcons (2004); New York Giants (2005)*; New York Jets (2005); Indianapolis Colts (2006–2007); Philadelphia Eagles (2008)*; Oakland Raiders (2008–2010)
- * Offseason or practice squad member only

Awards and highlights
- Super Bowl champion (XLI); First-team All-Southland Conference (2003-2004); Second-team All-Southland Conference (2002)

Career NFL statistics
- Rushing attempts: 5
- Rushing yards: 13
- Receptions: 17
- Receiving yards: 90
- Receiving touchdowns: 1
- Stats at Pro Football Reference

Richard Luke Lawton (born August 26, 1980) is an American former professional football player who was a fullback in the National Football League (NFL). He was signed by the Buffalo Bills as an undrafted free agent in 2004. He played college football for the McNeese Cowboys.

Lawton was also a member of the New York Giants, Atlanta Falcons, New York Jets, Indianapolis Colts, Philadelphia Eagles and Oakland Raiders.

== Early life ==
Lawton attended Saint Thomas More High School in Lafayette, Louisiana, and lettered in football and baseball. He earned All-District and All-Parish honors in both sports.

== College career ==
At McNeese State University, Lawton earned three-time All-Conference and two-time All-America honors at fullback from The Sporting News. Mel Kiper Jr. also listed Lawton as the top fullback prospect in the country in 2004 in all divisions. He finished his Cowboys career with 1,114 rushing yards, 775 receiving yards and 31 touchdowns.

== Professional career ==
=== Second stint with Giants ===
Lawton re-signed with the New York Giants in early 2005. He suffered a broken nose during training camp on August 22, 2005, and underwent surgery on August 24. He was waived on August 29.

=== New York Jets ===
Lawton was signed to the New York Jets' practice squad on September 5, 2005. He was promoted to the active roster on November 18. He played in his first NFL game on November 20. He was waived on December 13, and re-signed to the practice squad on December 15. He was signed to a one-year contract worth $310,000 on January 4, 2006. He was released on July 27.

=== Indianapolis Colts ===
Lawton was signed to the Indianapolis Colts' practice squad on November 29, 2006. He remained on the practice squad for the rest of the 2006 season, and was re-signed on February 14, 2007. Lawton debuted for the Colts in the season-opener in 2007, but was released on October 29 and re-signed again on October 31. He was released again later in the season and was re-signed again on November 28. He caught his first touchdown pass from Peyton Manning in the fourth quarter of the second meeting between the Colts and Jacksonville Jaguars in week thirteen. The touchdown was the game winner, and clinched the AFC South division for Indianapolis.

=== Philadelphia Eagles ===
Lawton was traded to the Philadelphia Eagles on June 6, 2008, in exchange for a conditional draft pick in the 2009 NFL draft. He was released on August 23, and the Eagles did not have to give up a draft pick to the Colts due to his release from the team.

=== Oakland Raiders ===
Lawton was claimed off waivers from the Eagles by the Oakland Raiders on August 26, 2008. He was waived on August 30, and re-signed on September 3. Lawton was suspended for four games by the NFL on December 24, 2009, for violation of the league's ban on performance-enhancing substances. He was suspended for the last two games of the 2009 season and the first two games of the 2010 season. On September 21, 2010, however, as soon as the suspension was lifted, the Raiders released him.
