= Ron Meeks =

American football player and coach (born 1954)

Personal information
- Born: August 27, 1954 (age 72); Jacksonville, Florida, U.S.

Career information
- College: Arkansas State

Career history

Playing
- 1977–1979: Hamilton Tiger-Cats
- 1979: Ottawa Rough Riders
- 1980–1981: Toronto Argonauts

Coaching
- 1984–1985: Arkansas State
- 1986–1987: Miami
- 1988: New Mexico State
- 1989–1990: Fresno State
- 1991: Dallas Cowboys
- 1992–1996: Cincinnati Bengals
- 1997–1999: Atlanta Falcons
- 2000: Washington Redskins
- 2001: St. Louis Rams
- 2002–2008: Indianapolis Colts (DC)
- 2009–2010: Carolina Panthers (DC)
- 2011: Carolina Panthers (DB)
- 2012: San Diego Chargers (DB)

Awards and highlights
- Super Bowl champion (XLI); National champion (1987)

Ron Meeks (born August 27, 1954) is a former gridiron football player and coach. His son is former Stanford cornerback Quenton Meeks.

Meeks played high school football for the Robert E. Lee Generals in Jacksonville, Florida. Meeks played college football at Arkansas State University and in the professionally in the Canadian Football League (CFL) with the Hamilton Tiger-Cats, Ottawa Rough Riders and Toronto Argonauts.

Meeks started coaching in the National Football League (NFL) for the Dallas Cowboys in 1991 and coached for the Cincinnati Bengals, Atlanta Falcons, Washington Redskins and St. Louis Rams, before joining the Indianapolis Colts in 2002. He resigned as the Colts defensive coordinator on January 20, 2009. He was hired as the defensive coordinator for the Carolina Panthers on January 26, 2009. His contract with the Panthers expired after the 2010 season. He was re-signed as their defensive backs coach on January 17, 2011. On January 24, 2012, Meeks agreed to become the new defensive backs coach of the San Diego Chargers.
