= National Register of Historic Places listings in Kankakee County, Illinois =

Location of Kankakee County in Illinois

This is a list of the National Register of Historic Places listings in Kankakee County, Illinois.

This is intended to be a complete list of the properties and districts on the National Register of Historic Places in Kankakee County, Illinois, United States. Latitude and longitude coordinates are provided for many National Register properties and districts; these locations may be seen together in a map.

There are 16 properties and districts listed on the National Register in the county.

This National Park Service list is complete through NPS recent listings posted May 22, 2026.

== Current listings ==
| | Name on the Register | Image | Date listed | Location | City or town | Description |
|---|---|---|---|---|---|---|
| 1 | B. Harley Bradley House and Stable | B. Harley Bradley House and Stable | June 2, 2009 (#09000374) | 701 S. Harrison Ave. 41°06′44″N 87°51′40″W | Kankakee | |
| 2 | Edward Chipman Public Library | Edward Chipman Public Library | February 7, 2017 (#100000629) | 126 N. Locust St. 41°09′50″N 87°39′39″W | Momence | |
| 3 | Downtown Momence Historic District | Downtown Momence Historic District | May 31, 2006 (#06000449) | Roughly Washington St., from N. Locust to Pine and the Dixie Highway, and from 2nd to River; 41°09′24″N 87°39′46″W | Momence | |
| 4 | Durham-Perry Farmstead | Durham-Perry Farmstead | May 31, 2006 (#06000445) | 459 N. Kennedy Dr. 41°08′58″N 87°52′34″W | Bourbonnais | |
| 5 | Warren Hickox House | Warren Hickox House | January 3, 1978 (#78001158) | 687 S. Harrison Ave. 41°06′44″N 87°51′41″W | Kankakee | |
| 6 | Hunter-Hattenburg House | Hunter-Hattenburg House | January 31, 2008 (#07001475) | 825 S. Chicago Ave. 41°06′32″N 87°51′34″W | Kankakee | |
| 7 | Illinois Central Railroad Depot | Illinois Central Railroad Depot | April 28, 2000 (#00000409) | 199 S. East Ave. 41°07′10″N 87°51′56″W | Kankakee | |
| 8 | Kankakee County Courthouse | Kankakee County Courthouse | March 7, 2007 (#07000115) | 450 E. Court St. 41°07′09″N 87°51′37″W | Kankakee | |
| 9 | Kankakee Downtown Historic District | Kankakee Downtown Historic District | June 11, 2018 (#100002150) | Roughly bounded by West Ave. and Oak, Indiana, and Station Sts. 41°07′13″N 87°51′50″W | Kankakee | |
| 10 | Kankakee State Hospital Historic District | Kankakee State Hospital Historic District | August 4, 1995 (#95000987) | 100 E. Jeffery St. 41°06′10″N 87°51′41″W | Kankakee | |
| 11 | Lemuel Milk Carriage House | Lemuel Milk Carriage House | June 4, 1979 (#79000849) | 165 N. Indiana Ave. 41°07′16″N 87°51′41″W | Kankakee | |
| 12 | Point School | Point School | November 5, 1992 (#92001539) | 6976 N. Vincennes Trail; 41°13′22″N 87°37′53″W | Grant Park | |
| 13 | Pope Brace Company Building | | September 1, 2021 (#100006866) | 197 South West Ave. 41°07′10″N 87°51′59″W | Kankakee | |
| 14 | Riverview Historic District | Riverview Historic District | August 22, 1986 (#86001488) | Roughly bounded by River and Eagle Sts., Wildwood Ave., and the Kankakee River; 41°06′37″N 87°51′30″W | Kankakee | |
| 15 | Charles E. Swannell House | Charles E. Swannell House | June 3, 1982 (#82002551) | 901 S. Chicago; 41°06′36″N 87°51′38″W | Kankakee | |
| 16 | Windrose Site | Windrose Site | April 28, 2000 (#00000412) | Kankakee River Nature Preserve, west of Bradley; 41°10′20″N 87°57′03″W | Bourbonnais | |

== See also ==
- List of National Historic Landmarks in Illinois
- National Register of Historic Places listings in Illinois
