= Charles E. Swannell House =

Historic house in Illinois, United States

- U.S. National Register of Historic Places
- U.S. Historic district – Contributing property
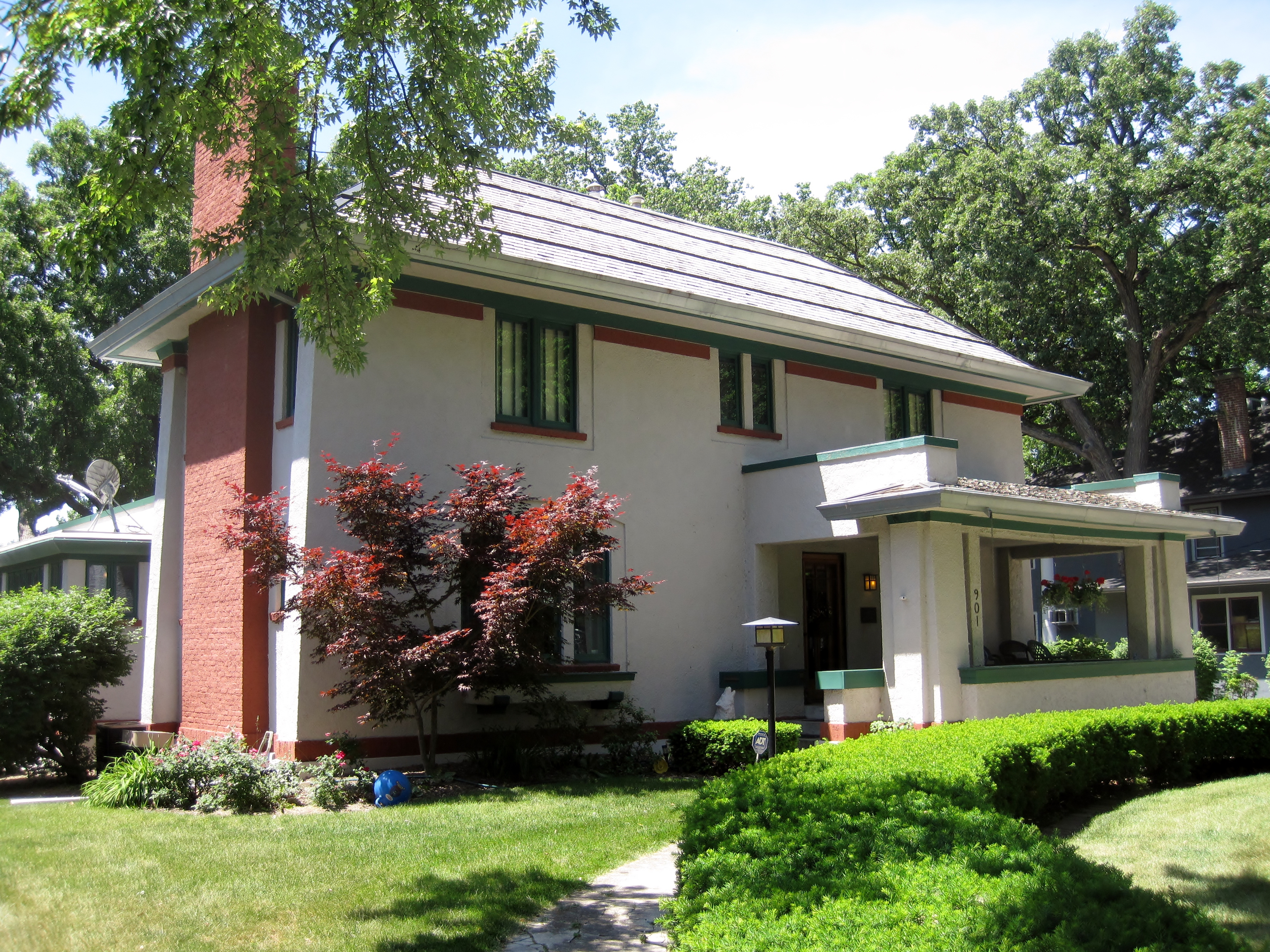

- Location within Illinois Location within the United States
- Location: 901 S. Chicago, Kankakee, Illinois
- Coordinates: 41°6′36″N 87°51′38″W
- Area: 0.3 acres (0.12 ha)
- Built: 1911
- Architect: Tallmadge & Watson
- Architectural style: Prairie School
- Part of: Riverview Historic District (Kankakee, Illinois) (ID86001488)
- NRHP reference No.: 82002551
- Added to NRHP: June 3, 1982

The Charles E. Swannell House is a Prairie School house in Kankakee, Illinois, United States. Designed by Tallmadge & Watson in the Prairie School style, it originally belonged to a local merchant.

== History ==
Charles Edward Swannell was born in Momence, Illinois in 1856. He attended Lake Forest Academy and the Jacksonville Business College. His father Frederick founded a dry goods store, which Charles joined in 1871; five years later, he was named a partner. His brother Arthur joined the firm in 1882, when he purchased his father's interest in the store. The company, C. E. & A. Swannell, owned and operated the Swannell Building at the corner of Court Street and Shuyler Avenue in Kankakee. The building had a dry goods store, public market, blacksmith, and offices.

The house was designed by Prairie School architectural firm Tallmadge & Watson. It is the only building by the architects in Kankakee. The firm designed the house in 1911; three years later it was featured in a publication entitled Fireproof Houses of NATCO Hollow Tile. On June 3, 1982, the house was recognized by the National Park Service with a listing on the National Register of Historic Places. On August 22, 1986, it was also listed as a contributing property to the Riverview Historic District.

== Architecture ==
The Charles E. Swannell House is on a 100-by-135-foot (30 m × 41 m) lot on the Kankakee River in Kankakee. The main facade faces east toward South Chicago Avenue. Built on a concrete foundation, the two-story house has an attic and a massive hipped roof. A dormer window from the attic faces west. The roof has cedar shingles with metal ridges. Like many Tallmadge & Watson houses, the exterior walls are gently sloped inward as they rise. The walls are built with 10-inch (250 mm) NATCO hollow clay tiles covered in cream-colored stucco. These walls are decorated with brick for the water table and a stringcourse under the rood. The house is divided into three bays; the northern bay of the main facade features a rectangular open porch.
