= List of people from Kankakee, Illinois =

The following list includes notable people who were born or have lived in Kankakee, Illinois. For a similar list organized alphabetically by last name, see the category page People from Kankakee, Illinois.

== Film, television, and theater ==
- Jordan Black (born 1970), actor
- David Bruce (1914–1976), actor
- Bryan Dattilo (born 1971), actor
- Kristin Dattilo (born 1970), actress
- Merna Kennedy (1908–1944), actress
- Fred MacMurray (1908–1991), actor, star of more than 100 films and TV series My Three Sons
- Nancy Snyder (born 1949), actress
- Randy Spears (born 1961), actor
- Kara Zediker, actress
- Rico Ross, actor

== Literature and media ==
- Jill De Vries (born 1953), Playboy Playmate, October 1975
- Harold Gray (1894–1968), creator of Little Orphan Annie
- Paul Hendrickson (born 1944), author
- Genevieve Lipsett (1885–1935), journalist and suffragist

== Military ==
- Thomas V. Draude (born 1940), decorated U.S. Marine officer
- Harry Stella (1916–1997), decorated U.S. Army colonel

== Music ==
- Yea Big, musician
- Gregory Kunde (born 1954), operatic tenor
- Cora Decker Sargent (1868-1944), composer

== Politics and law ==
- Benjamin W. Alpiner (1867–1946), Illinois state legislator and mayor of Kankakee
- Louis E. Beckman (1876–1946), Illinois state legislator and mayor of Kankakee
- Louis E. Beckman Jr. (1914–1992), Illinois state legislator; born in Kankakee
- John Benoit (1951–2016), California state legislator, was born in Kankakee.
- Edward McBroom (1925–1990), Illinois state legislator and businessman
- Mary K. O'Brien (born 1965), Illinois state legislator and judge, was born in Kankakee.
- Daniel H. Paddock (1852–1905), Illinois state representative and lawyer, lived in Kankakee.
- George Ryan (1934-2025), 39th governor of Illinois
- Samuel H. Shapiro (1907–1987), 34th governor of Illinois, practiced law in Kankakee and died there at age 79
- Lennington Small (1862–1936), 26th governor of Illinois
- Chastity Wells-Armstrong (born 1971/1972), first African-American to serve as mayor of Kankakee
- Hamilton K. Wheeler (August 5, 1848 – July 19, 1918) was an Illinois State Senator and U.S. Representative from Kankakee
- Herman W. Snow (1836–1914), U.S. representative, Civil War captain, lived and died in Kankakee.
- Rick Winkel (born 1956), Illinois state legislator, was born in Kankakee.
- Adam Kinzinger (born 1978), United States House member from 2011 to 2023 and Lieutenant Colonel (United States) in the Air National Guard, was born in Kankakee.

== Science and art ==
- George Grey Barnard (1863–1938), sculptor, raised in Kankakee
- Vernon W. Hughes (1921–2003), physicist, born in Kankakee

== Sports ==
- Rube Foster (1879–1930), baseball Hall of Famer, died in Kankakee
- Tyjuan Hagler (born 1981), NFL linebacker and Super Bowl (XLI) champion
- Scott Meents (born 1964), NBA player, born in Kankakee
- Ted Petersen (born 1955), NFL offensive lineman
- Billy Petrick (born 1984), MLB pitcher
- Tom Prince (born 1964), MLB catcher, born in Kankakee
- Joie Ray (1894–1978), three-time Olympian, bronze medalist, born in Kankakee
- Mike Russow (born 1976), UFC mixed martial artist
- Harv Schmidt (1935–2020), college basketball coach
- Jack Sikma (born 1955), Hall of Fame NBA player from 1976–91, born in Kankakee
- Jimmy Smith (born 1960), NFL running back
- Lorenzo Smith III (born 1978), Olympic bobsledder
- Bruce Vaughan (born 1956), professional golfer
- Jonathan Ward (born 1997), NFL running back
- Terry Wells (born 1963), MLB pitcher

== Other ==
- Lemuel Milk (1820–1893), landowner, businessman, lived and died in Kankakee
- John Moisant (1868–1910), aviation pioneer, born in Kankakee
