= Durham–Perry Farmstead =

- U.S. National Register of Historic Places
- U.S. Historic district
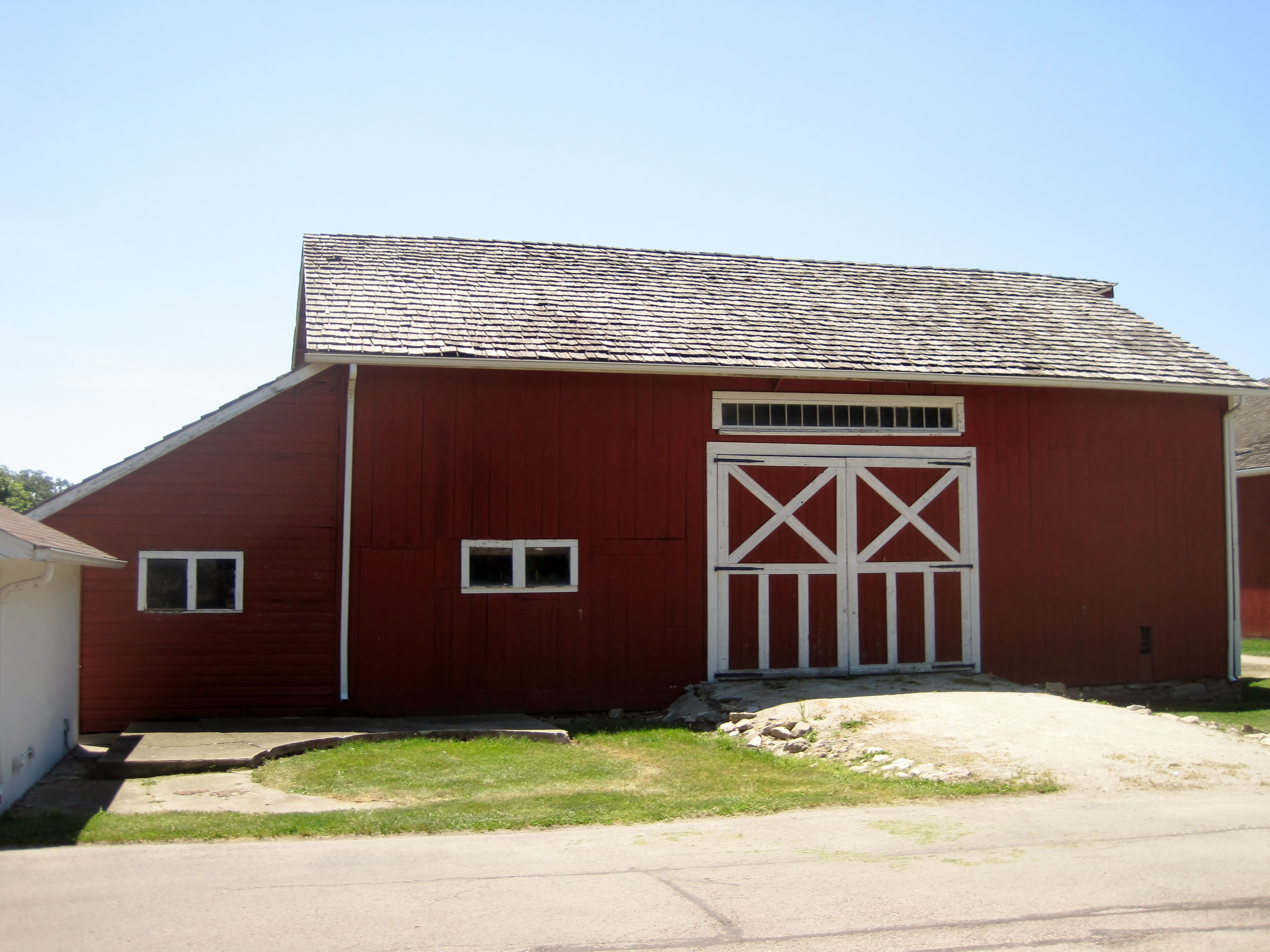

- Location within Illinois Location within the United States
- Location: 459 N. Kennedy Dr., Bourbonnais, Illinois
- Coordinates: 41°8′58″N 87°52′34″W
- Area: 2.5 acres (1.0 ha)
- Built by: Thomas Durham, David Perry
- Architectural style: I-house, et al.
- NRHP reference No.: 06000445
- Added to NRHP: May 31, 2006

The Durham–Perry Farmstead is a park and open-air museum in Bourbonnais, Illinois on the grounds of the former Thomas Durham farm. The buildings reflect the agricultural practices of Illinois farmers in the 19th and early 20th centuries. The heavy timber-framed buildings are representative of northern Illinois construction trends between the 1830s and 1850s.

== History ==
Fur trader Jacque Jonveau was awarded a 640-acre (260 ha) land grant from the United States General Land Office following the Treaty of Camp Tippecanoe in October 1832. Jonveau was of mixed Pottawatomi and French descent and was thus eligible for one of the ten grants set aside for persons of Pottawatomi blood. It does not appear that Jonveau ever built a structure on the grant.

Thomas Durham was born in Richmond, Virginia in 1784 and moved with his family to Tennessee by 1804. In the late 1810s, Sometime shortly after 1826, Durham moved to Vermilion County, Illinois to work as a bricklayer. Durham may have met Gordon S. Hubbard, the regional director for the American Fur Company, at his trading post in Iroquois County in 1827. Durham worked for Hubbard in 1832, supervising the construction of the Vermilion County Courthouse, and again in 1834 building a warehouse in Chicago.

Between these two jobs, Durham traveled the Hubbard Trace, a road between Chicago and Danville, which passed through Bourbonnais Township. Durham camped in the township and enjoyed the surroundings so much that he purchased a 160-acre (65 ha) tract from Hubbard in 1835; it is not known how Hubbard came to have possession of Jonveau's holdings. Local Pottawatomi helped the Durham family build a teepee, while a log cabin was under construction. Soon, a large farmhouse replaced the cabin. Durham may have used his farmhouse as a tavern, as traffic along the Hubbard Trace was heavy in the late 1830s. By 1850, Durham extended the family holdings to 320 acres (130 ha), half of which was developed.

Durham's daughter Martha married David Perry, who owned a house on a 1 acre (0.40 ha) lot across the road from Durham's. Perry, a carpenter, came to Kankakee County from Vermont. Perry owned a sawmill in nearby Momence. When Durham died in March 1854, the land passed to Durham's sons. However, after some failed business ventures in Kankakee, they had little money. Perry offered to purchase the farm, thus keeping the house in the family while also supporting the Durhams' operations.

Perry remodeled the house shortly after he and Martha moved in. He lived there and farmed the land until his death in 1887, when the land passed to his son Alvah. Alvah Perry only used the property for vacations, as he was usually busy as a cattle broker in the Union Stock Yards in Chicago. In 1891, he sold the property east of the road to developer J. Herman Hardebeck. In 1924, Perry rented the western property to Armand DuVoisin, a Swiss immigrant, who tended the remaining acreage. DuVoisin worked the farm until his 1950 retirement.

Lomira Perry, the last living child of Alvah Perry, died in 1961. In her will, she deeded the property to the Illinois Department of Conservation with the hopes that a park would be developed. Perry stipulated that DuVoisin descendants could continue to operate the farm, which they continue to do as of 2006.

On May 31, 2006, the National Park Service recognized the property with a listing on the National Register of Historic Places.

== Perry Farm Park ==
Ownership of the property was transferred to the Bourbonnais Township Park District in 1989, which developed the property as Perry Farm Park. The park features open recreation areas, four miles of walking trails, and the Exploration Station children's museum. The Perry Farm Living History Area includes the farmhouse, which now houses the Park District and is used as an interpretive center, the horse barn, an English barn and farm animals.
