= David Bradley (plowman) =

American businessman (1811 – 1899)

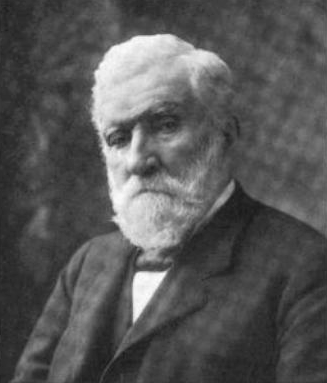
- Born: November 8, 1811; Groton, New York
- Died: February 19, 1899 (aged 87); Chicago, Illinois
- Burial place: Rosehill Cemetery
- Occupation: Businessman
- Spouse: Cynthia Abbott (m. 1838)
- Children: 6

David Bradley (November 8, 1811 – February 19, 1899) was an American businessman and a pioneer plowman.

== Biography ==
David Bradley was born in Groton, New York on November 8, 1811. After working with his brother, C. C. Bradley, for several years in Syracuse, he relocated to Chicago in 1835. Initially he was in the employ of Jones, King & Co. and helped to build the first foundry in Chicago, known as the "Chicago Furnace".

From the late 1830s until the 1850s David Bradley farmed in Lake County, Illinois, made bricks, and later farm machinery, in Racine, Wisconsin, and was a lumberman in Michigan. In 1854, he returned to Chicago.

== Company ==
In 1873, he purchased a plow company from his brother in law, and soon partnered with Conrad Furst to create Furst and Bradley. Furst and Bradley eventually grew to occupy an entire city block at Fulton and Desplaines Streets in Chicago. In 1884 David Bradley and his sons purchased Furst's share of the business, and the company was renamed the David Bradley Manufacturing Company.

In 1895 the company was relocated to North Kankakee (about 50 miles south of Chicago), which was later renamed Bradley, Illinois in honor of the man and the company.

In 1910, the Bradley family sold the factory to Sears, Roebuck and Co., at which time it was renamed the David Bradley Manufacturing Company. The name was subsequently changed to David Bradley Manufacturing Works and in 1958 the company introduced the Garden Riding Tractor and David Bradley became the largest manufacturer of garden riding tractors in the world. Sears also sold gasoline engines manufactured by Briggs & Stratton under David Bradley, replacing the previously used Economy name. In 1962 David Bradley Manufacturing Works and the Newark Ohio Company were merged into a single unit under the name Newark Ohio Company. The new company manufactured power lawn mowers, among other products, although the Bradley, IL plant continued to manufacturer lawnmowers In 1964 another merger took place and the Newark Ohio Company was merged into the Geo. D. Roper Corporation with the plant in Newark, Ohio continuing to manufacture outdoor power equipment including riding and single power lawn mowers. Again, the Bradley IL plant, built in 1892 as a furniture manufacturing plant, continued to be used. All of the original buildings of the Bradley IL plant were destroyed in a 1986 fire.

== Family ==
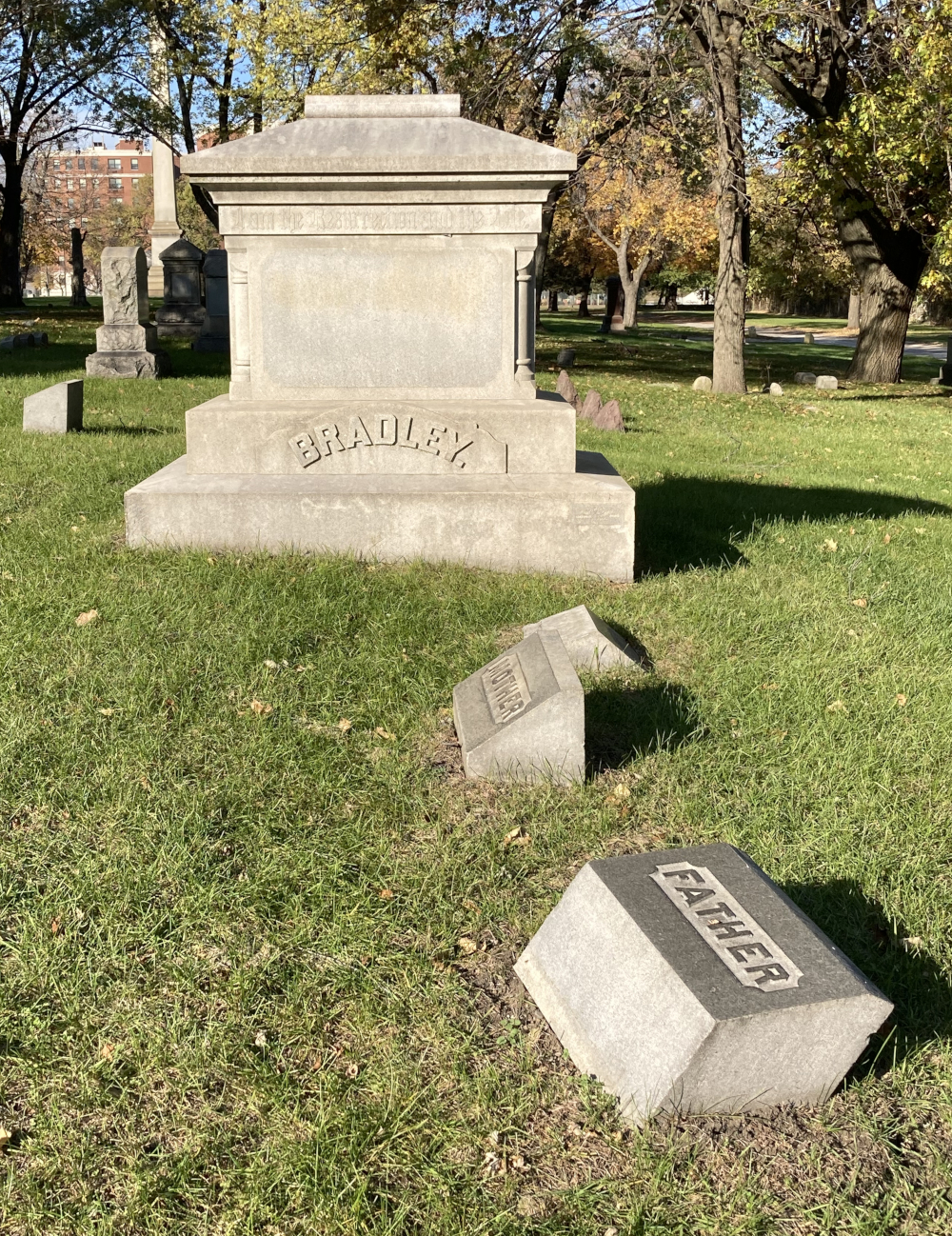
Bradley's grave at Rosehill Cemetery

On February 25, 1838 in Chicago, David Bradley married Cynthia Abbott (1817–1895) of Barre, Vermont. They had six children:

- Byron Chapman Bradley, b. May 1, 1839 Libertyville, Lake County, IL, of Kankakee, IL, m. Alice M. Wilbur. Their son B. Harley Bradley built a house called Glenlloyd, or the B. Harley Bradley House, designed by Frank Lloyd Wright, in Kankakee, IL.
- Edgar Bradley, b. January 15, 1841 Libertyville, IL; d. there September 18, 1841.
- Mary Ellen Bradley, b. September 14, 1842 Racine, WI; of Chicago, IL; d. October 1, 1899 Mt. Vernon, Westchester County, NY; m. Chicago October 10, 1865 George Cadogen Morgan (1834/35-).
- Joseph Harley Bradley, b. September 30, 1844 Racine, WI; of Chicago, IL; m. Brooklyn, NY March 1, 1871 Margina J. Richards (c. 1846 – 1896) of New York, NY.
- Adelbert Bradley, b. April 15, 1847 Racine, WI; d. there September 1848.
- David Bradley, b. February 15, 1849 Chicago, IL; d. there February 15, 1849.

David Bradley died at his home in Chicago on February 19, 1899, and was buried at Rosehill Cemetery.
