= Riverview Historic District (Kankakee, Illinois) =

Historic district in Illinois, United States

- U.S. National Register of Historic Places
- U.S. Historic district
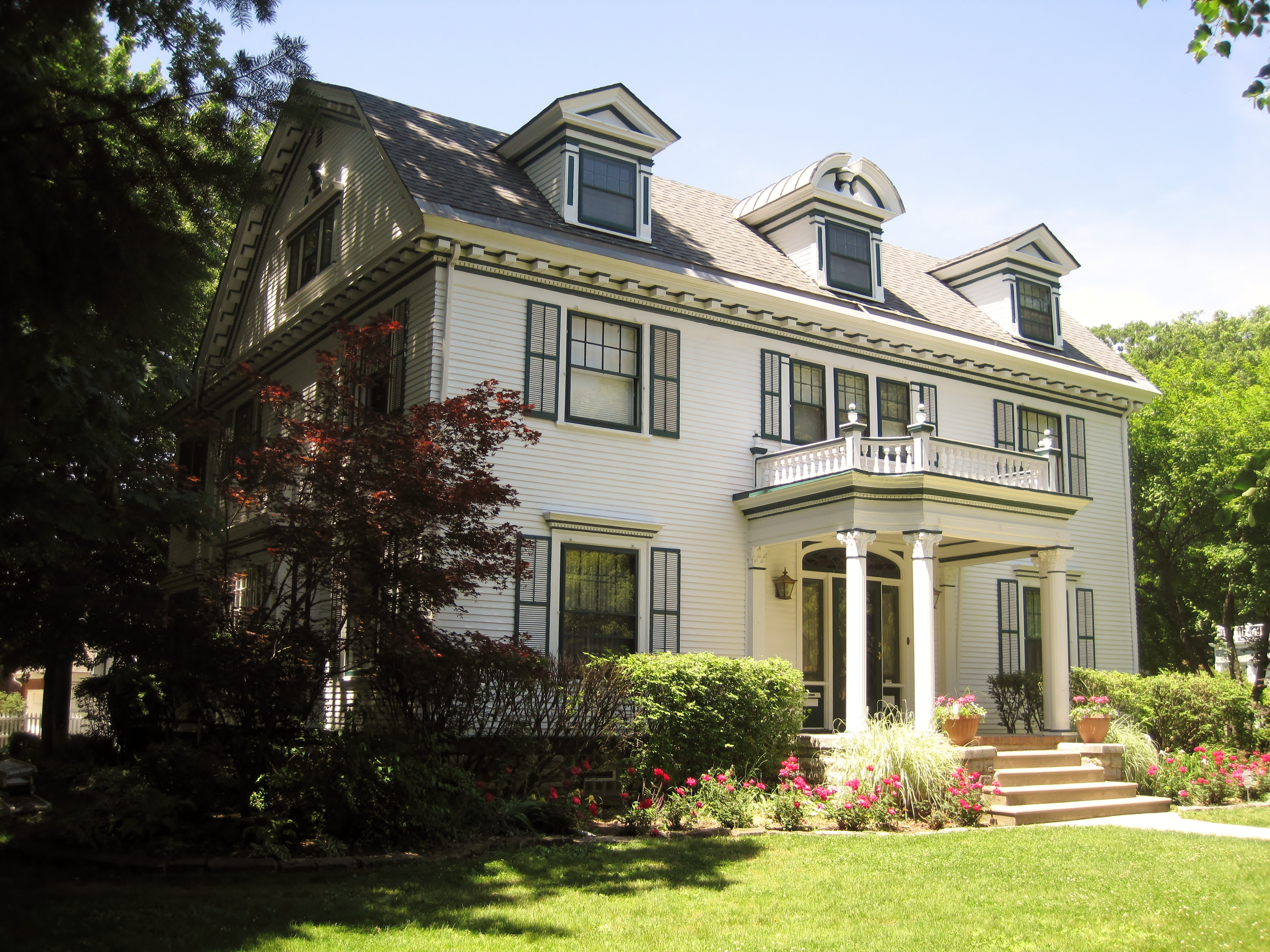
- The Campbell–Powers House in the Riverview Historic District

- Location within Illinois Location within the United States
- Location: Roughly bounded by River and Eagle Sts., Wildwood Ave., and the Kankakee River, Kankakee, Illinois
- Coordinates: 41.10946°N 87.85822°W
- Area: 78.2 acres (31.6 ha)
- Architect: Frank Lloyd Wright, Tallmadge & Watson, et al.
- Architectural style: American Craftsman, Prairie School, Late Victorian
- NRHP reference No.: 86001488
- Added to NRHP: August 22, 1986

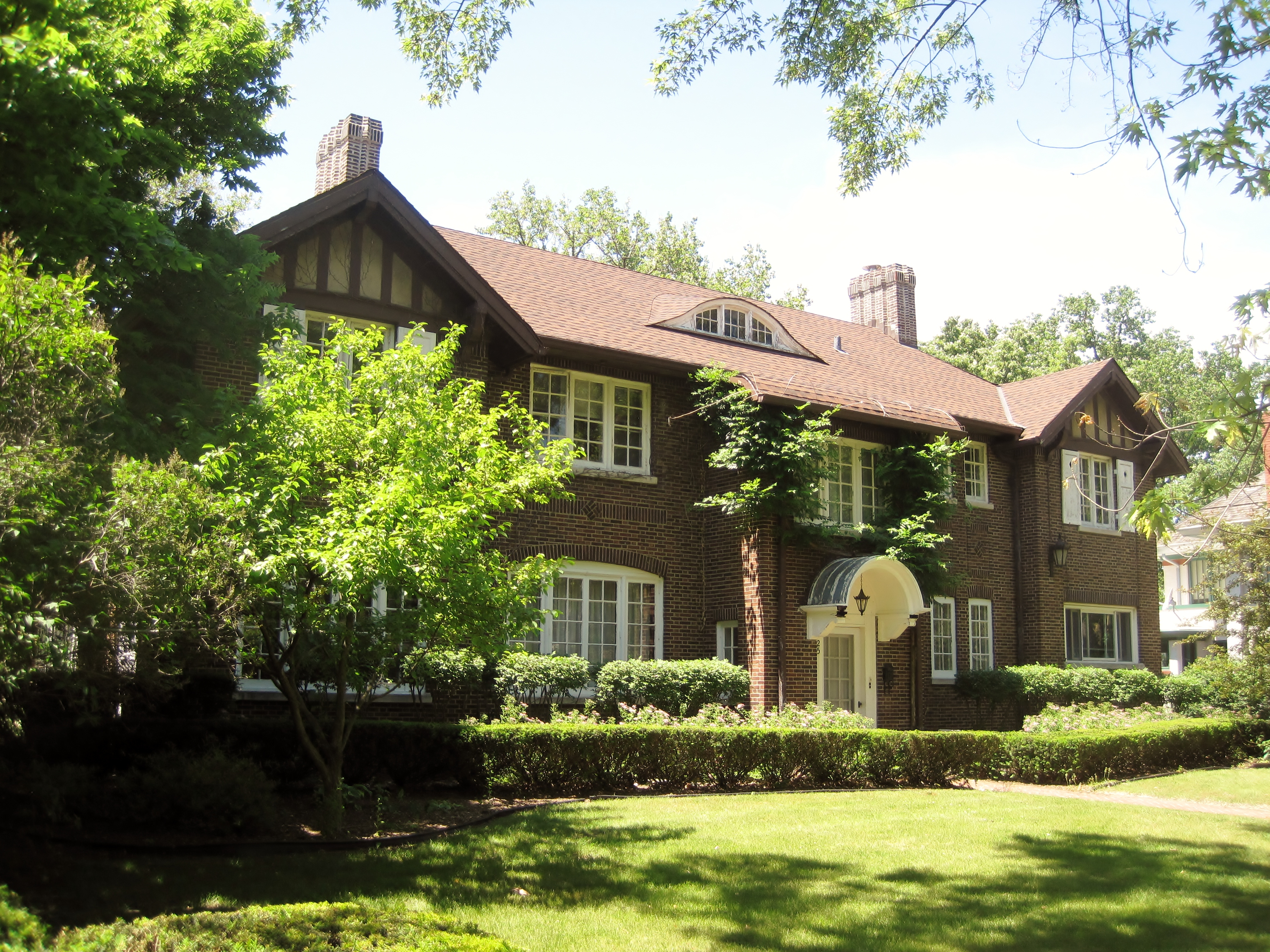
Drs. John and Violet Brown House

The Riverview Historic District is a historic district in Kankakee, Illinois, United States. The 78.2-acre (31.6 ha) area, located around the Kankakee River, is the oldest intact residential neighborhood in the city. It was initially settled by Emory Cobb, who used the land as pasture before erecting a resort hotel. After the hotel burned down, the property was subdivided. The district includes 118 contributing buildings, including two Frank Lloyd Wright houses.

== History ==
Kankakee, Illinois, was founded in 1853 shortly after the Illinois Legislature approved the creation of Kankakee County; Kankakee was selected as the county seat. The Illinois Central Railroad built a station at this time, spurring rapid growth. By 1858, the population had swelled to 5,000. Early settler Lemuel Milk drained marshes to create a habitable space along the Kankakee River.

Emory Cobb was the first settler to what would become the Riverview Historic District. Cobb was instrumental in founding Western Union, but retired in 1866 at age 34. He moved to Kankakee at this time and built his house at the southwest corner of what is now River Street and South Chicago Avenue. Cobb owned much of the land that would become the district, which he initially used as pasture. Heavily involved in Kankakee's early commercial development, Cobb built a resort hotel on his property. The Riverview Hotel, located in what is now the triangle formed by Park Place, South Chicago Avenue, and South Greenwood Avenue, opened in 1887 and operated for ten years before it was destroyed in a fire. After the fire, Cobb subdivided most of his property for residential use.

The neighborhood immediately became the most desired development in Kankakee. Merchants, lawyers, and industrialists built their houses in contemporary high styles. Foremost of these houses were in neighboring B. Harley Bradley House and the Warren Hickox House, both designed by prominent architect Frank Lloyd Wright. These were among Wright's first houses in the Prairie School style. Other houses in the district reflected Classical Revival and American Craftsman architecture. By 1935, almost the entire district had been developed.

== Architecture ==
The Riverview Historic District features 118 contributing properties among its 162 buildings. Of these, some are particularly notable for their historical or architectural significance:

- H. Topping House (1926), American Foursquare with Prairie School details. Harry Topping was a real estate developer who later served in the Illinois House of Representatives.
- Louis E. Beckman House (1920), Queen Anne. Beckman was mayor of Kankakee from 1925 to 1933. He also served two terms in the Illinois House of Representatives and three in the Illinois Senate.
- Warren R. Hickox House (1900), Frank Lloyd Wright Prairie School design. Hickox was an attorney.
- B. Harley Bradley House (1901), Frank Lloyd Wright Prairie School design. Bradley made his fortune with the David Bradley Manufacturing Company, which produced the "diamond plow."
- Colonel Haswell C. Clarke House (c. 1875), Shingle style. Col. Clarke married Harriet Cobb, Emory Cobb's sister. He was a banker and served two years as mayor of Kankakee (1899 to 1901). Divided in 1919, both houses contribute.
- 690 South Harrison Avenue (1915), American Foursquare with Prairie School details.
- Claude Granger House (1923), Dutch Colonial Revival. Granger was an attorney.
- William H. Volkmann House (1919 with a pre-1900 carriage house), Shingle style. The property was developed by Col. Haswell C. Clarke before 1900, but was extensively remodeled in 1919 by jeweler William H. Volkmann.
- Dr. Alfred W. Scobey House (1912), Colonial Revival. Dr. Scobey was a surgeon who worked for the Illinois Central Railroad.
- 667 South Chicago Avenue (1912), Queen Anne.
- Magruder–Deselm House (c. 1895), Queen Anne. Henry A. Magruder was a clothier and Alderman of the Second Ward of Kankakee. He served as mayor from 1897 to 1899. Kankakee County Judge Arthur W. Deselm later purchased the house.
- Woodruff–Radeke House (1896). W. K. Woodruff was the city engineer during the district's platting. In 1900, he sold the house to brewer F. D. Radeke.
- Alexis L. Granger House (1897), Colonial Revival with Classical Revival entryway. Granger was secretary and treasurer of the Illinois Eastern Hospital for the Insane.
- Edward LeCour House (1903–04), Shingle style. LeCour was a dry goods merchant and Town Supervisor.
- John Buffum House (1899), Colonial Revival. Buffum was a carpenter and contractor for the Indiana, Illinois & Iowa Railroad and later worked at the Illinois Eastern Hospital for the Insane.
- Frank Turk House (1902–04), Prairie School. Turk owned the Turk Furniture Company.
- Henry E. Volkmann House (1910), American Foursquare with Prairie School details.
- Hunter–Hattenburg House (1898), Queen Anne. William R. Hunter was the Kankakee City Attorney and later a judge on the Illinois Circuit Court. Albert F. Hattenburg was mayor of Kankakee from 1937 to 1953.
- Wayne H. Dyer House (1910), American Foursquare with Prairie School details designed by local architect C.D. Henry, who also designed the Volkmann building and the Masonic Temple, among others. Dyer was a prominent attorney and also served as Kankakee County State's Attorney from 1912-1920. Dr. Jesse H. Roth was the second owner of the home from 1920.
- Dr. C. K. Smith House (1905), Prairie School with Tudor Revival details. Dr. Smith was Kankakee's Public Health Officer.
- Charles E. Swannell House (1911), Tallmadge & Watson Prairie School design. Swannell was a dry goods merchant.
- Drs. John and Violet Brown House (1917), Tudor Revival. Dr. John Archibald Brown practiced in town while Dr. Violet Palmer-Brown worked at the Illinois Eastern Hospital.
- Wilhemine Mang House (1906–08), Prairie School with Gothic Revival details. She was the aunt of Louis E. Beckman.
- Charles Cobb House (1911), Prairie School. The eldest son of Emory, Cobb, was the superintendent of the Kankakee Water Works and manager of the Kankakee Electric Street Railway Company. He also joined his father in the LeCour & Sons dry goods store. Leone & Mary Suttelle, managers of the Kankakee Foundry, later lived here.
- Dr. G. W. Geiger House (1929), Tudor Revival. Geiger practiced in town. Howard McCracken, an executive vice president with the City National Bank, later owned the house.
- H. H. Troup House (1912), Colonial Revival. Troup owned a lumber and building materials company.
- Joseph Rondy House (1920), American Craftsman. Rondy owned a bookstore. General Arthur Inglesh, a commander of the Illinois State Militia who married the daughter of Governor Len Small, later lived here.
- Herman & Lena Beckman Handorf House (1925), Mission Revival. Herman owned the Kankakee Bottling Company. His wife, Lena, was the sister of Louis E. Beckman.
- Fred Mann House (1908), Zachary Taylor Davis Mission Revival. Fred Mann was the Mayor of Kankakee from 1907 to 1909.
