= Kankakee Downtown Historic District =

Historic district in Illinois, United States

- U.S. National Register of Historic Places
- U.S. Historic district
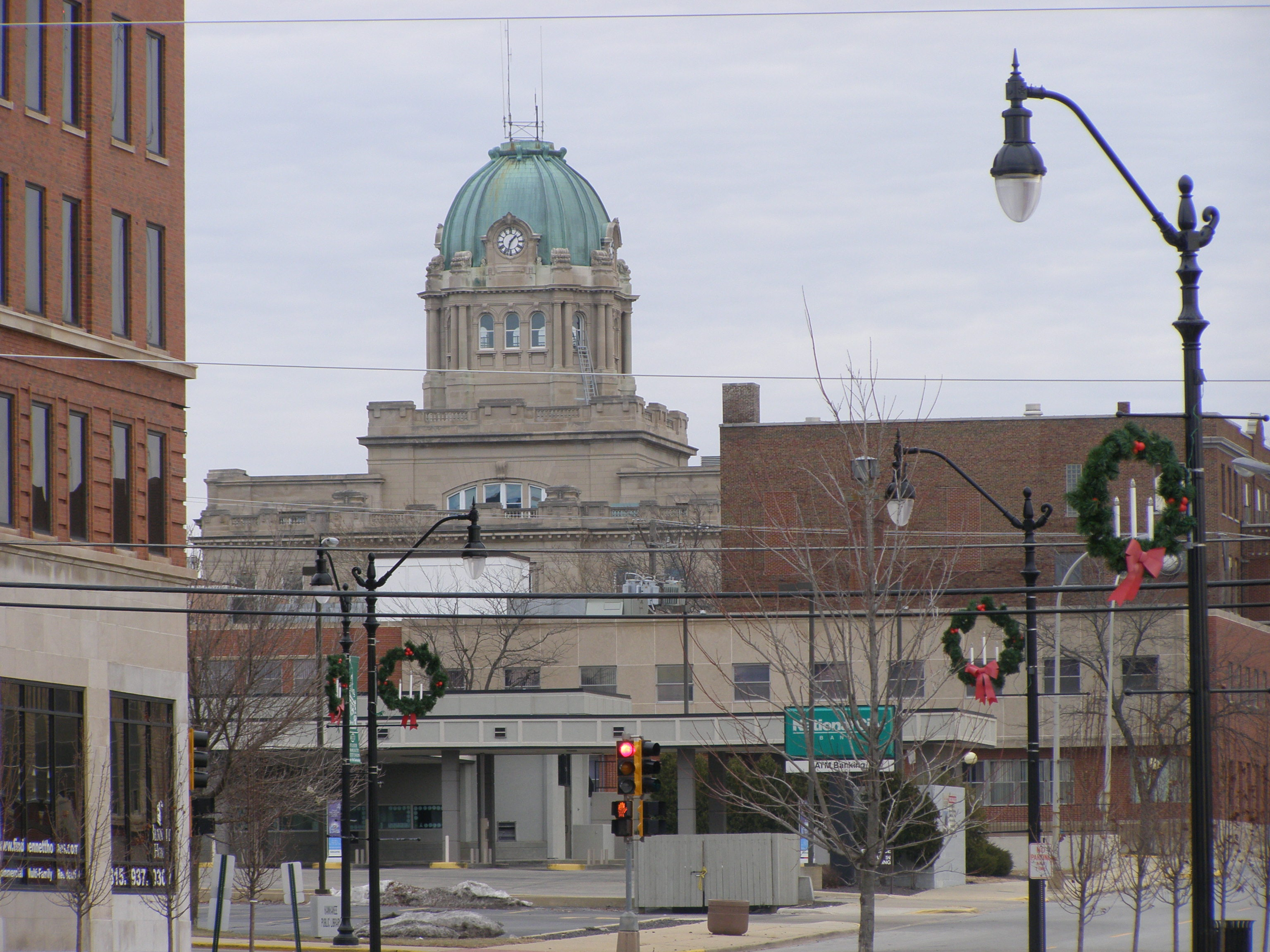

- Location within Illinois Location within the United States
- Location: Roughly bounded by West Ave. and Oak, Indiana, and Station Sts., Kankakee, Illinois
- Coordinates: 41°07′13″N 87°51′50″W
- NRHP reference No.: 100002150
- Added to NRHP: June 11, 2018

The Kankakee Downtown Historic District is a national historic district in downtown Kankakee, Illinois. The district includes 73 buildings which form the commercial and governmental center of the city, most of which are grouped along Court Street and Schuyler Avenue. While development in the district began in the 1850s, the oldest surviving building in the district is from 1864; the newest contributing buildings are from the mid-twentieth century. Kankakee's Courthouse Square and the 1908 Kankakee County Courthouse are part of the district; other government buildings in the district include Kankakee's post office, police and fire station, and armory. Most of the district's other buildings are one- to three-story brick or stone commercial buildings. Many popular architectural styles of the nineteenth and twentieth centuries are represented in the district; the Italianate, Neoclassical, and Art Deco styles are among the most common.

The district was added to the National Register of Historic Places on June 11, 2018.
