= F.B. Henderson House =

Historic house in Illinois, United States

- U.S. National Register of Historic Places
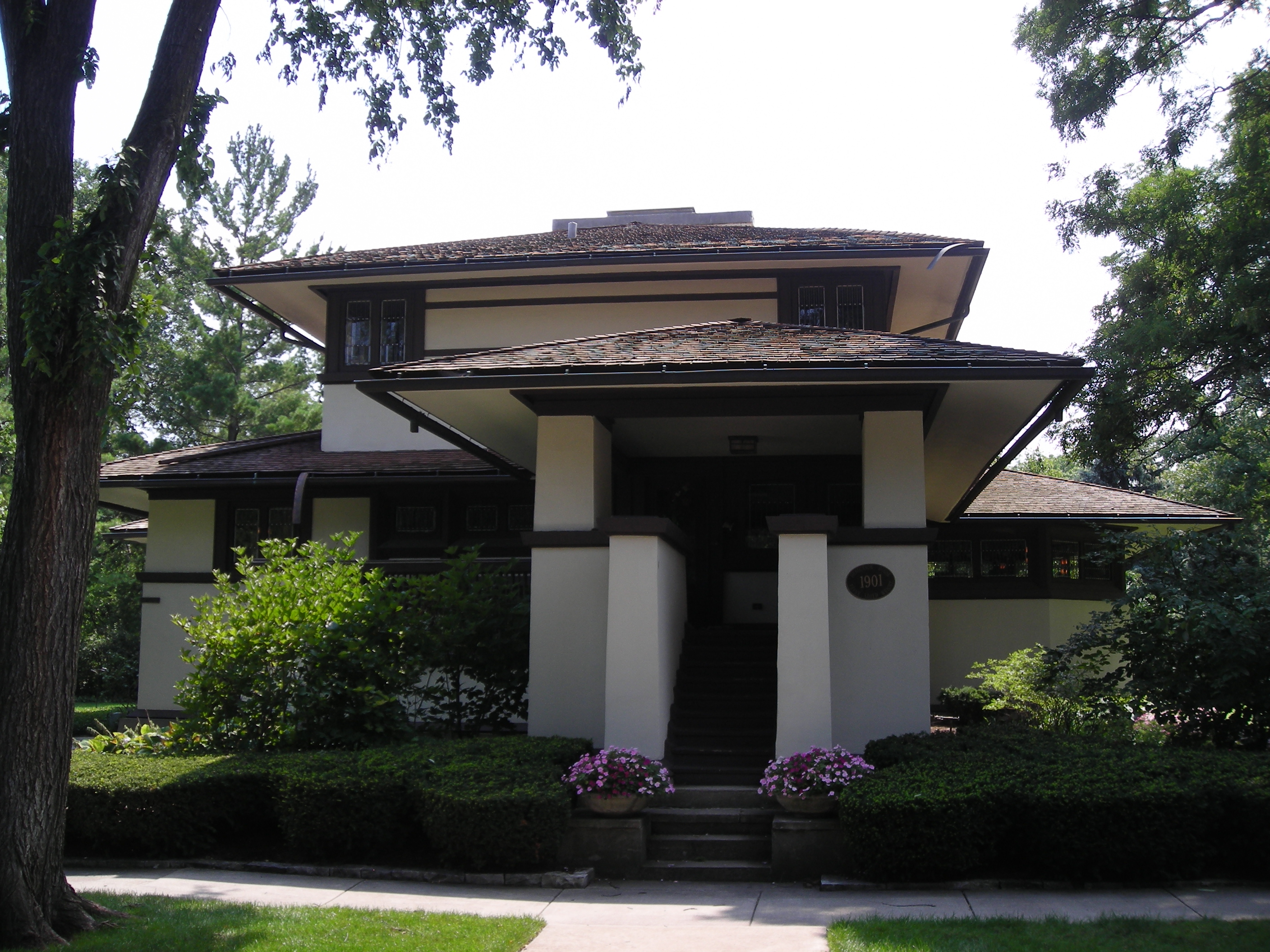

- Location within Illinois
- Interactive map showing the location of F.B. Henderson House
- Location: 301 South Kenilworth Ave., Elmhurst, Illinois
- Coordinates: 41°53′31.66″N 87°56′17.01″W
- Built: 1901
- Architect: Frank Lloyd Wright
- Architectural style: Prairie School
- NRHP reference No.: 02000844
- Added to NRHP: August 9, 2002

The F.B. Henderson House is a Frank Lloyd Wright designed Prairie School home in Elmhurst, Illinois.

== History ==
This house was one of just a few built during Wright's brief partnership with Webster Tomlinson, the only partnership Wright ever had. However, Wright remained the designing partner of the firm, with Tomlinson acting as the business manager. It was listed for sale in 2019 and is currently a private residence.

== Design ==
The interior floor plan is similar to that of the Warren Hickox House, although the exteriors are very different. The plan of the house is also similar, in the main living spaces, to the Edwin H. Cheney House of Oak Park. The home has one large space subtly divided into library, living room, and dining room, all in-line. A large veranda off the living room overlooks the over one-half acre of landscaped grounds. The house has over 80 art glass windows, elegant woodwork, three brick fireplaces, and many built-ins.

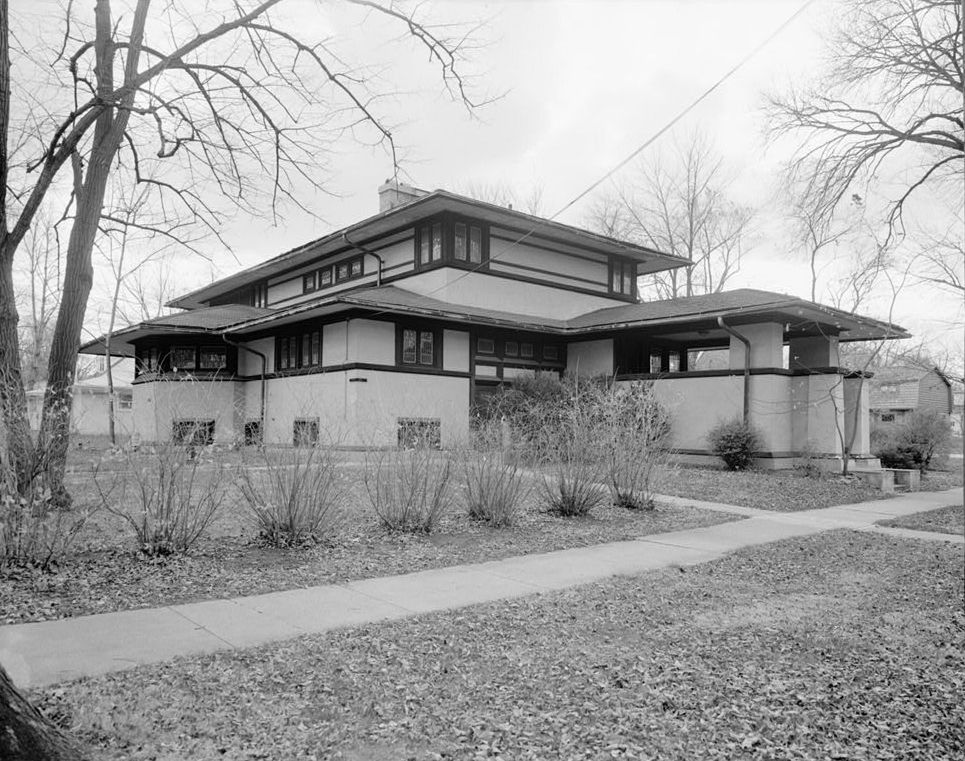
F. B. Henderson House; L.O.C. HABS archives

== See also ==
- List of Frank Lloyd Wright works
- National Register of Historic Places listings in DuPage County, Illinois
