= Edward Chipman Public Library =

- U.S. National Register of Historic Places
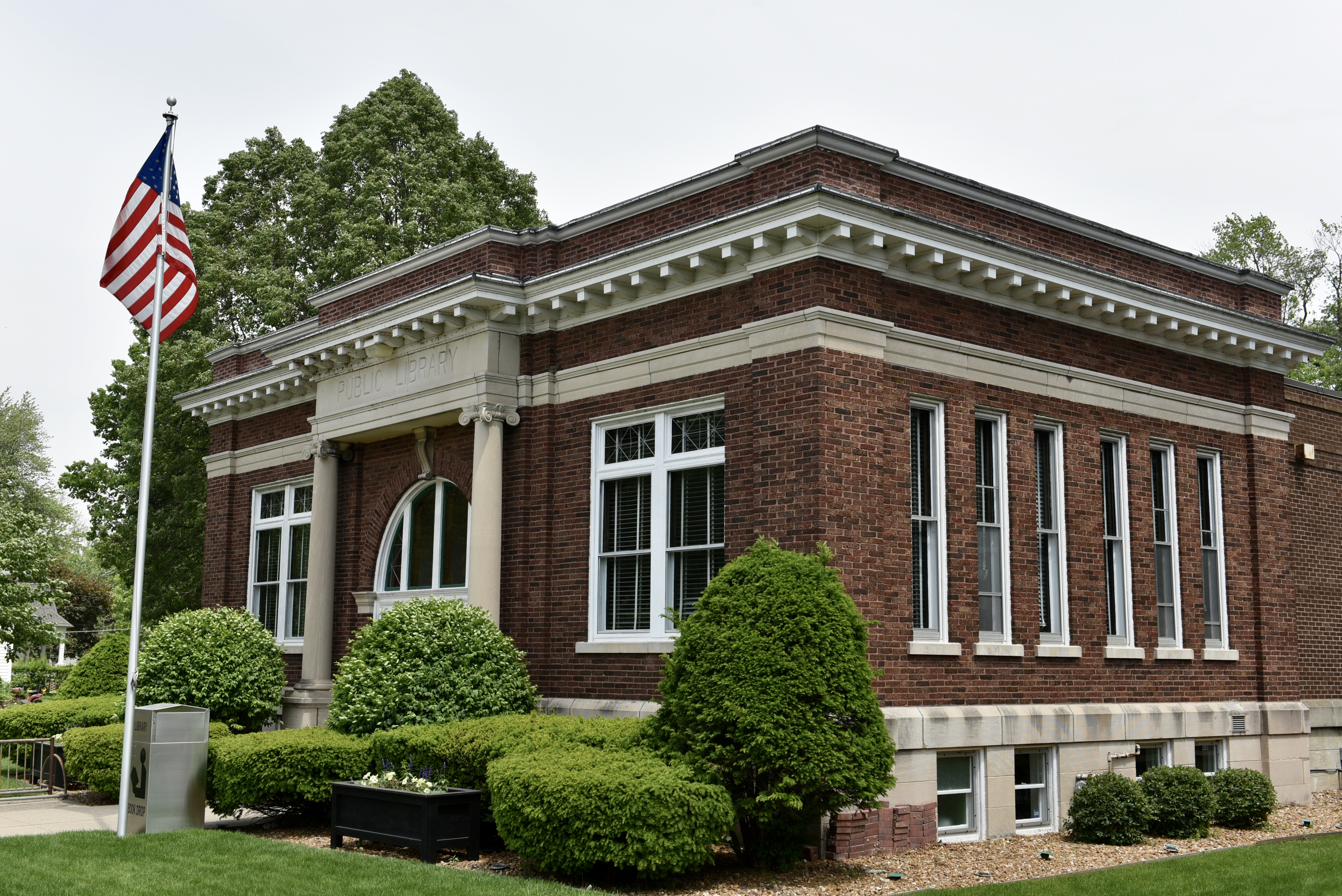

- Location within Illinois Location within the United States
- Location: 126 N. Locust St., Momence, Illinois
- Coordinates: 41°09′50″N 87°39′39″W
- Built: 1912
- Architect: Charles Danforth Henry
- Architectural style: Classical Revival
- NRHP reference No.: 100000629
- Added to NRHP: February 7, 2017

The Edward Chipman Public Library is a historic public library located at 126 N. Locust Street in Momence, Illinois. Momence's library board was formed in 1901, and the town's first library opened in 1907 in three rooms in the Momence State and Savings Bank. Edward Chipman, the bank's main stockholder, left $10,000 for a new library building upon his death in 1910, and the current building was completed in 1912. Architect Charles Danforth Henry designed the Neoclassical building, which features a portico at the front entrance and a limestone entablature that includes a cornice with modillions. The building has served as the city's library since its opening; it also briefly served as a hospital during the 1918 flu pandemic.

The library was added to the National Register of Historic Places on February 7, 2017.
