= Warren Hickox House =

Historic house in Kankakee, Illinois

- U.S. National Register of Historic Places
- U.S. Historic district – Contributing property
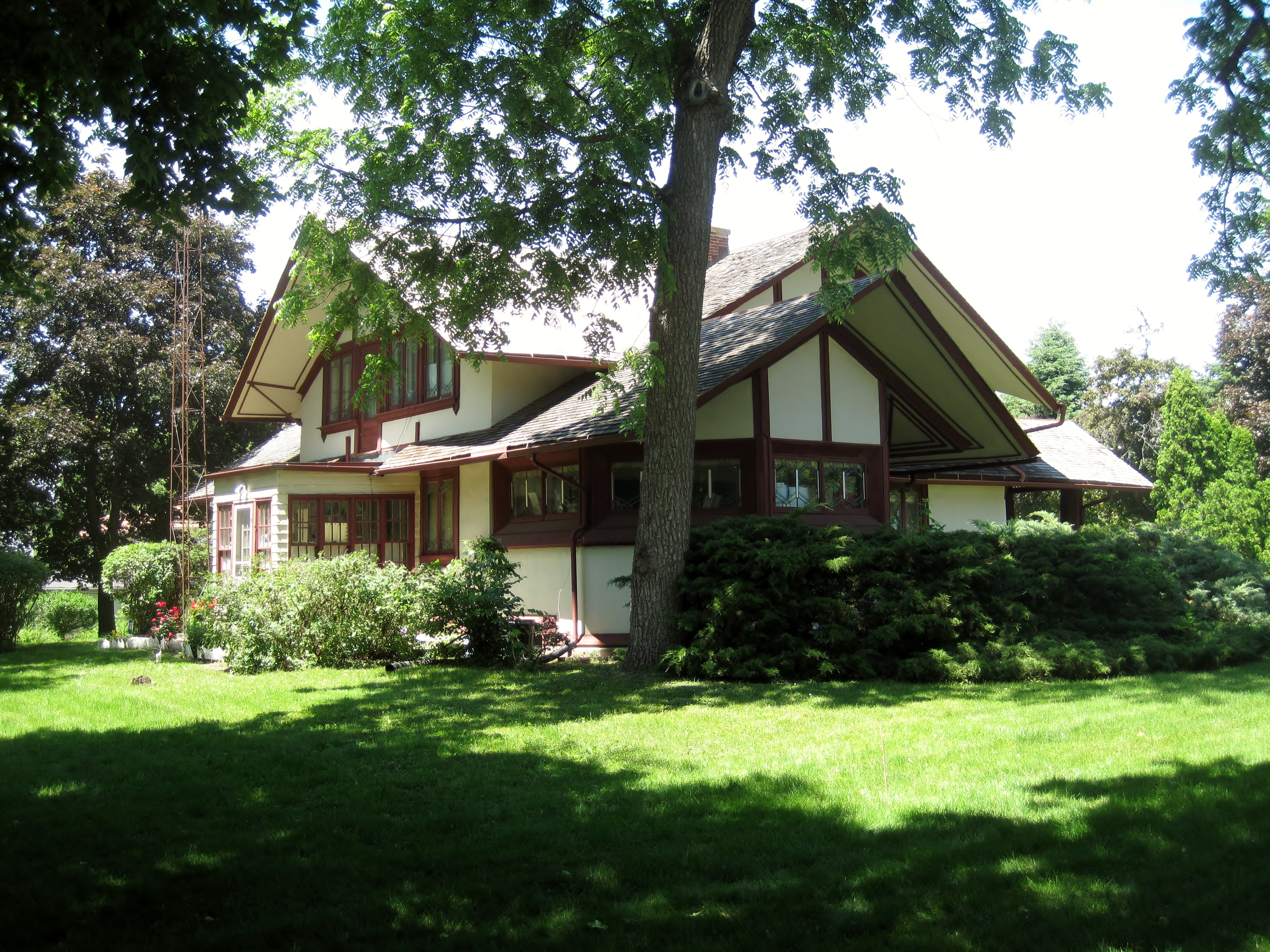

- Location within Illinois
- Location: Kankakee, Illinois
- Coordinates: 41°6′44″N 87°51′41″W
- Built: 1900
- Architect: Frank Lloyd Wright
- Architectural style: Prairie School
- Part of: Riverview Historic District (Kankakee, Illinois) (ID86001488)
- NRHP reference No.: 78001158
- Added to NRHP: 01/03/1978

The Warren Hickox House, also known as the Hickox/Brown House, is a Prairie style house designed in 1900 by Frank Lloyd Wright in Kankakee, Illinois, United States. The house's design is similar to those in two articles that Wright wrote for the Ladies' Home Journal.

== History ==
Warren Hickox Jr. ran a real estate and loan business in Kankakee, Illinois. Warren was the brother of Anna Hickox Bradley, who lived next door in another Wright design, the B. Harley Bradley House. The house was modeled after those in two articles that Wright wrote for the Ladies' Home Journal. The interior is adapted from "A Home in a Prairie Town" and the exterior is based on "A Small House with Lots of Room in It". These designs themselves may have been based on "Primitive Chinese House", an article in Histoire de l'Habitation Humaine, depuis les Temps Préhistoriques Jusqu'à nos Jours by Eugène Viollet-le-Duc. The builder may have used the Hickox House as a temporary headquarters while the Bradley House was still under construction.

The house was owned by the same family from 1976 until 2024, when the building was placed on sale for $779,000. In early 2025, the house was sold for $449,000. The buyers planned to renovate the house.

== Architecture ==
The exterior walls are covered in white plaster, decorated with stained woodwork. Interior walls are also plaster with a sand finish. Interior woodwork, except oak floors, is Georgia pine and is suggestive of Tudor half-timber framing. The F. B. Henderson House in Elmhurst, Illinois, is a mirror-image of the building. The house also has a very similar design to the S. A. Foster House in Chicago. The house has four bedrooms and a chimney. The house retains much of its original integrity except for the removal of the kitchen entrance and south terrace. The house is considered a "mature" example of Wright's Prairie school designs and has been called "one of the single most significant houses" designed by Wright. The house was added to the National Register of Historic Places on January 3, 1978. On August 22, 1986, the house was also listed as part of the Riverview Historic District.

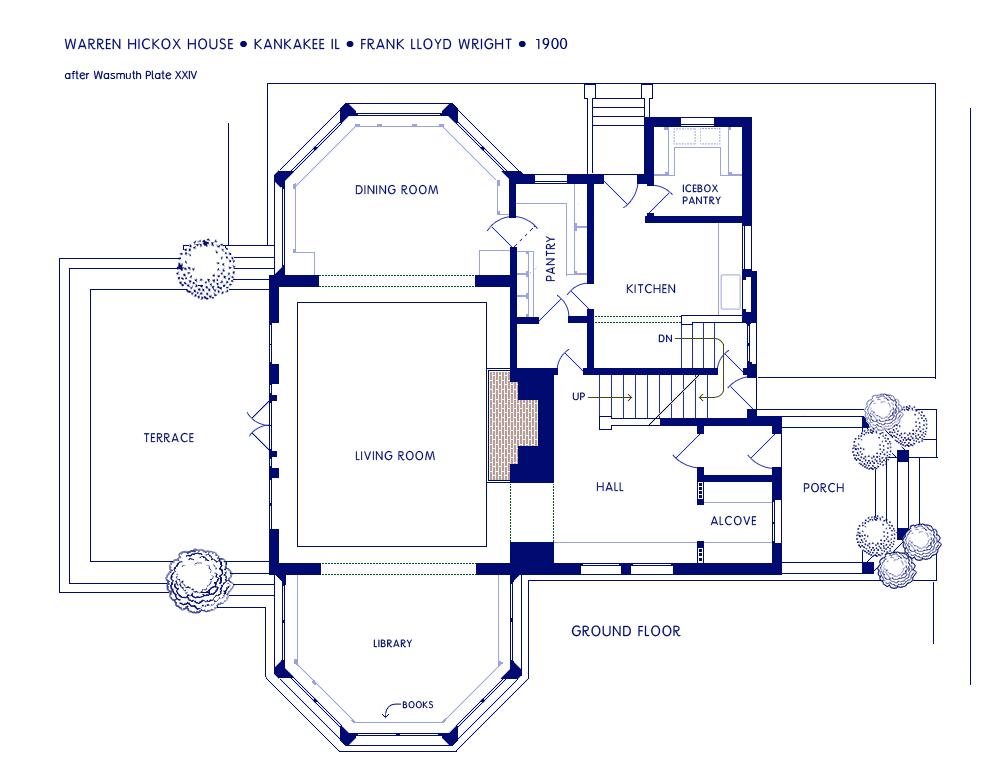
Ground floor plan

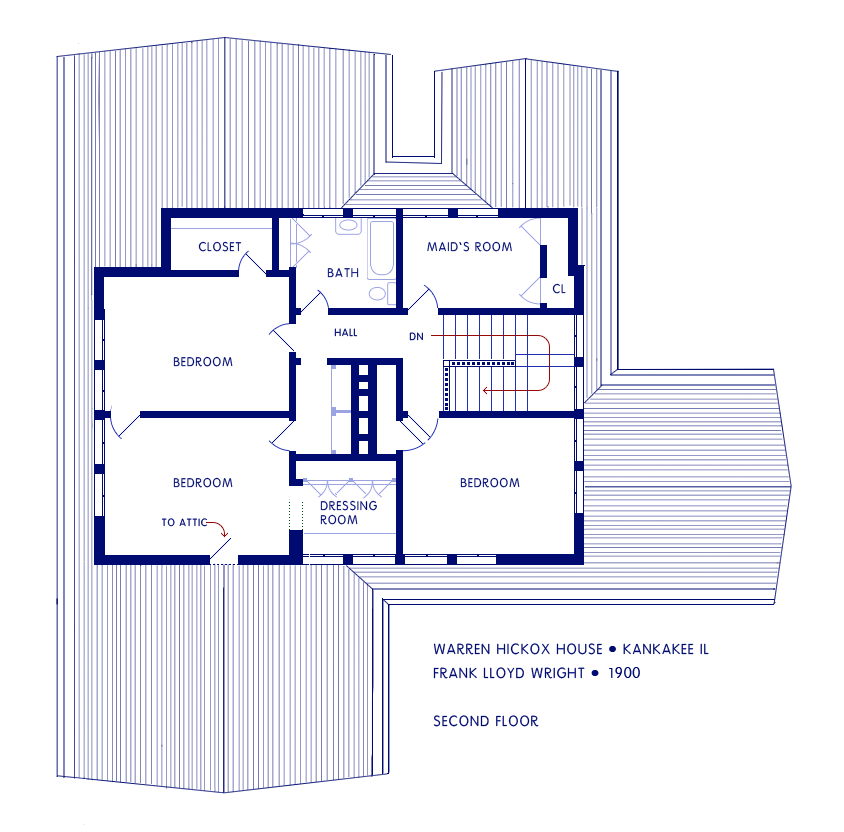
Second floor plan

== See also ==
- List of Frank Lloyd Wright works
- National Register of Historic Places listings in Kankakee County, Illinois
