= Hunter–Hattenburg House =

Historic house in Illinois, United States

- U.S. National Register of Historic Places
- U.S. Historic district – Contributing property
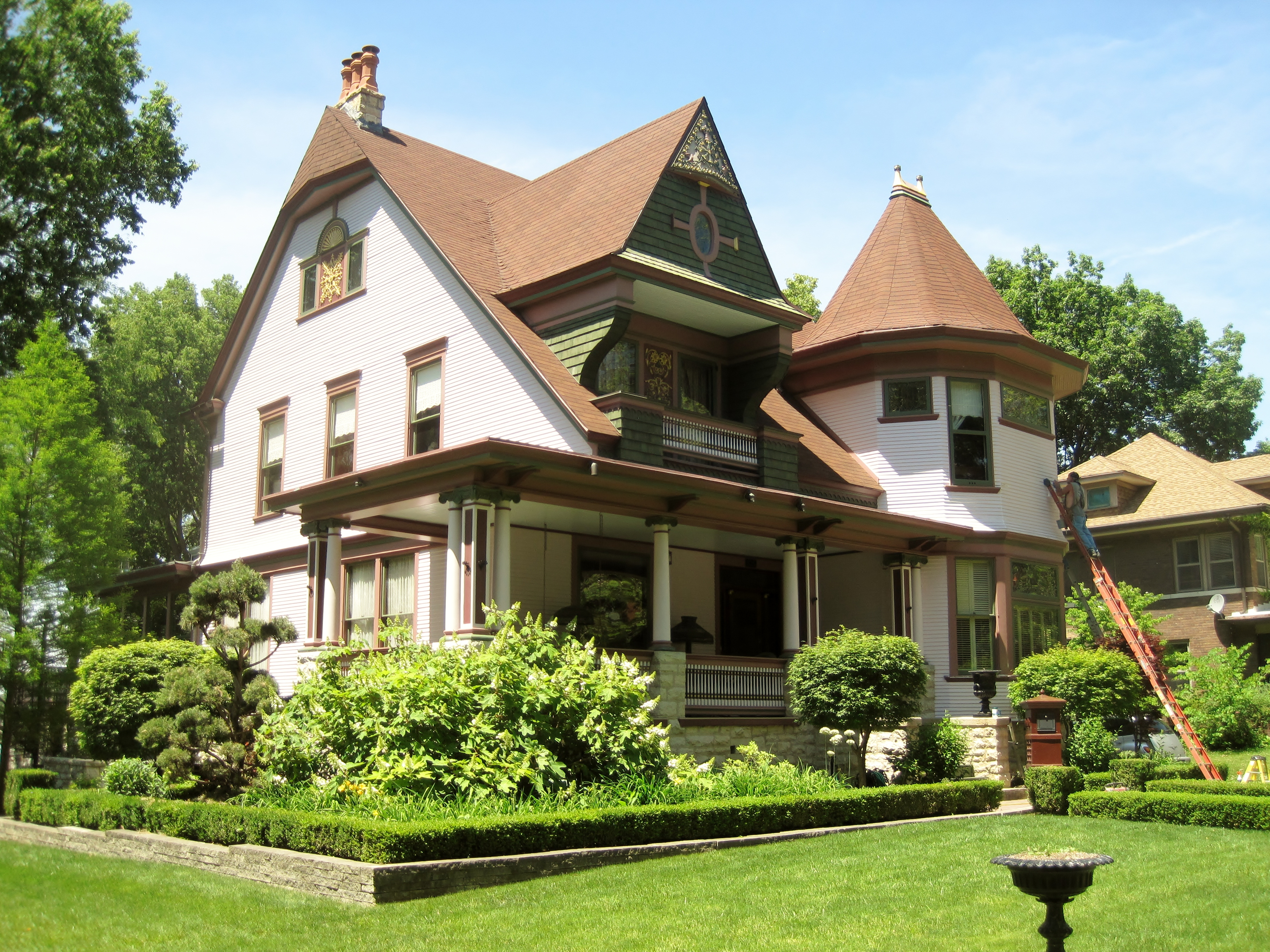

- Location within Illinois Location within the United States
- Location: 825 S. Chicago Ave., Kankakee, Illinois
- Coordinates: 41°6′32″N 87°51′34″W
- Area: 0.5 acres (0.20 ha)
- Built: 1898
- Architectural style: Queen Anne
- Part of: Riverview Historic District (Kankakee, Illinois) (ID86001488)
- NRHP reference No.: 07001475
- Added to NRHP: January 31, 2008

The Hunter–Hattenburg House is a historic Queen Anne-style house in Kankakee, Illinois, United States. It was built for William R. Hunter, a prominent lawyer in Kankakee who had previously served as Kankakee City Attorney and would later serve on the 12th Illinois Circuit Court. In 1942, the house was purchased by Kankakee mayor Albert F. Hattenburg.

== History ==
William R. Hunter was born in Hamilton, Ontario, Canada in 1858. Hunter spent much of his early life helping his father on the family farm. He moved to Kankakee, Illinois, United States in 1879. There, he was schooled by the pastor of the local Baptist Church and trained as a stenographer. While working this profession, he studied law in the office of Judge John W. Orr. Hunter was admitted to the bar in 1882, the same year he married his first wife Lillian Morrison. In 1886, after a brief sojourn in Los Angeles, California to recover from bronchitis, Hunter was appointed Kankakee City Attorney. In 1892, he joined Harry K. Wheeler to form a law firm. Lillian died in Colorado Springs, Colorado in January 1893; Hunter married his second wife Zula B. Fry in 1894.

By 1898, Hunter had amassed enough of a fortune to build a stately residence on the Kankakee River. The Hunter House cost $6800, three times the average price of a home in Kankakee. In 1933, Hunter was appointed a judge for the 12th Illinois Circuit Court. He served in this role until his death in 1939.

Albert F. Hattenburg purchased the house in 1942. Hattenburg moved to Kankakee after World War I and opened the Hattenburg Pharmacy in the Arcade Building. In 1937, Hattenburg was elected mayor of Kankakee as a Republican and served for 16 years. The house remained in the hands of the Hattenburg family until 2001.

The Hunter–Hattenburg House is one of the finest examples of Queen Anne architecture in Kankakee. Twenty-four Queen Anne Houses were built in Kankakee, but five were demolished and others have lost their architectural integrity. On August 22, 1986, the house was recognized by the National Park Service as a contributing property to the Riverview Historic District. On January 31, 2008, the house was recognized with an individual listing.
