= Downtown Momence Historic District =

Historic district in Illinois, United States

- U.S. National Register of Historic Places
- U.S. Historic district
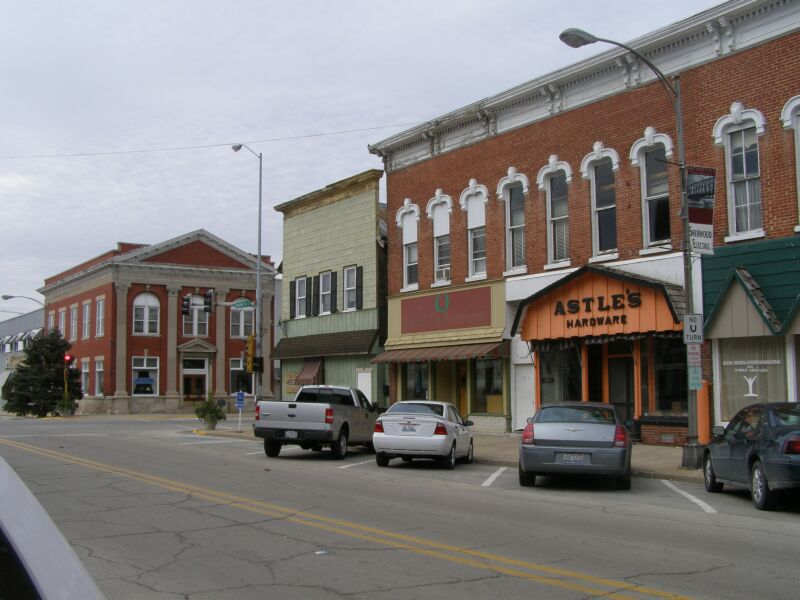

- Location within Illinois Location within the United States
- Location: Roughly Washington St., from N. Locust to Pine and Dixie Hwy., from 2nd to River, Momence, Illinois
- Coordinates: 41°9′24″N 87°39′46″W
- Area: 9 acres (3.6 ha)
- NRHP reference No.: 06000449
- Added to NRHP: May 31, 2006

The Downtown Momence Historic District is a national historic district which encompasses the commercial core of downtown Momence, Illinois. The district includes 49 contributing buildings, all but two of which are commercial buildings; the remaining two are residential. While the oldest building in the district dates to 1849, significant development in downtown Momence did not begin until the Chicago, Danville and Vincennes Railroad reached the city in 1871. Roughly one-third of the district's buildings, primarily retail stores, were built between 1871 and 1900. Most of the remaining buildings were built between 1900 and 1930; these were more diverse and included banks, entertainment and recreational facilities, and automobile-related businesses toward the end of the period. The architectural styles seen in the district are representative of American commercial architectural trends of the late 19th and early 20th centuries; the majority of the buildings have Italianate designs, though examples of Greek Revival, Classical Revival, and Romanesque Revival architecture can also be found in the district.

The district was added to the National Register of Historic Places on May 31, 2006.
