= Benjamin W. Alpiner =

American businessman and politician (1867–1946)

Member of the Illinois House of Representatives
- In office 1933 – July 15, 1946

Mayor of Kankakee, Illinois
- In office 1911–1913, 1915–1917, 1923–1925

Personal details
- Born: November 13, 1867 Chicago, Illinois, U.S.
- Died: July 15, 1946 (aged 78) Kankakee, Illinois, U.S.
- Party: Democratic
- Occupation: Politician, businessman

Benjamin W. Alpiner (November 13, 1867 – July 15, 1946) was an American businessman and politician.

Alpiner was born in Chicago, Illinois. He lived in Kankakee, Illinois, and was involved in the cigar manufacturing and banking businesses in Kankakee; Alpiner was the owner of the S. Alpiner & Son tobacco shop in Kankakee. Alpiner served as Kankakee City Clerk. He also served as mayor of Kankakee from 1911 to 1913, from 1915 to 1917, and from 1923 to 1925. Alpiner was a Democrat. Alpiner then served in the Illinois House of Representatives from 1933 until his death in 1946. He died at his home in Kankakee, Illinois, from a stroke and after being ill for several months.
