= B. Harley Bradley House =

Historic house in Illinois, United States

- B. Harley Bradley House and Stable
- U.S. National Register of Historic Places
- U.S. Historic district – Contributing property
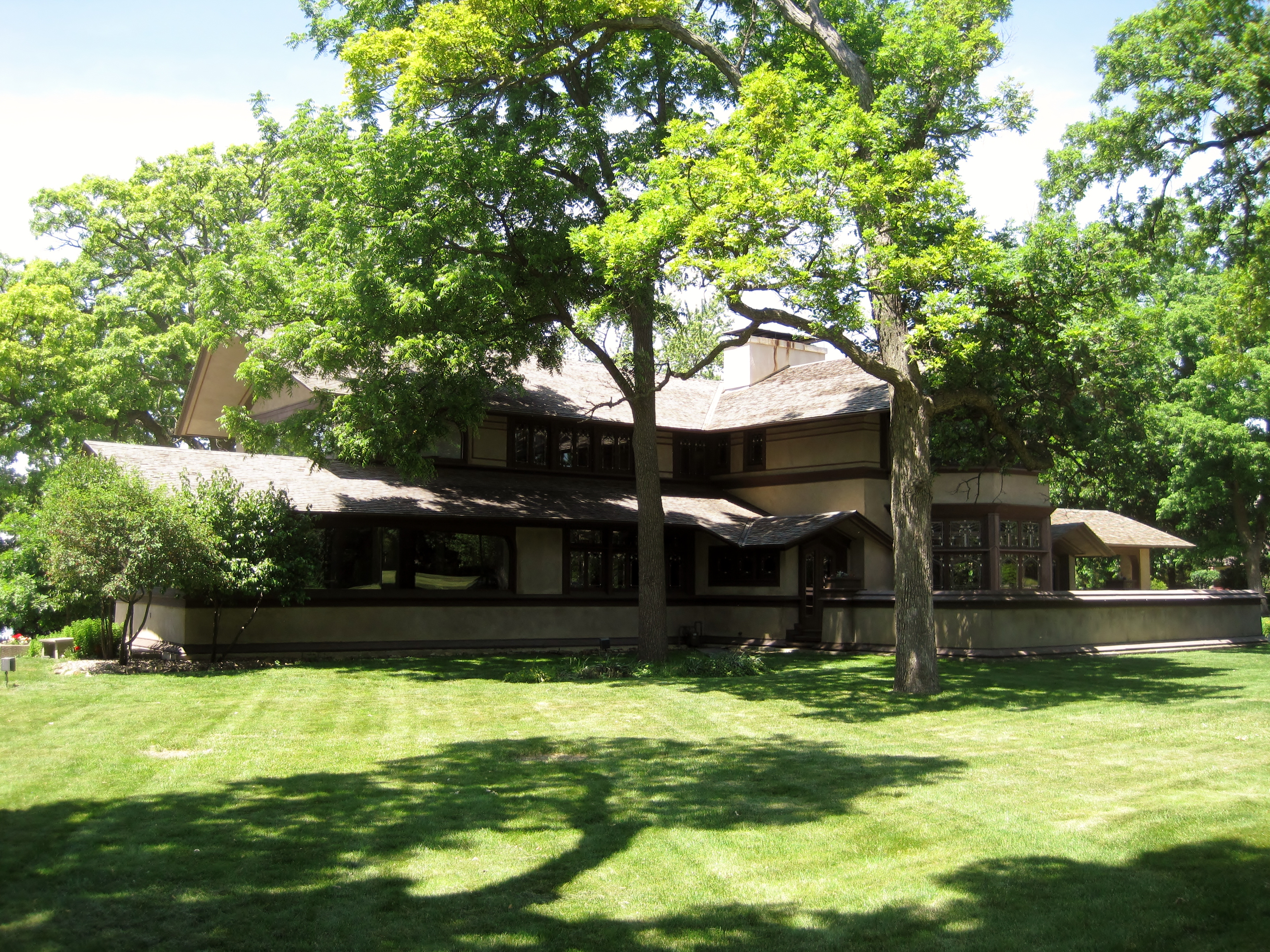

- Location within Illinois Location within the United States
- Location: 701 S. Harrison Ave., Kankakee, Illinois
- Coordinates: 41°6′43″N 87°51′42″W
- Area: 1 acre (0.40 ha)
- Built: 1900–1901
- Architect: Frank Lloyd Wright
- Architectural style: Prairie School
- Part of: Riverview Historic District (Kankakee, Illinois) (ID86001488)
- NRHP reference No.: 09000374
- Added to NRHP: June 2, 2009

The B. Harley Bradley House is a Frank Lloyd Wright-designed home, constructed in the Prairie School style, that was constructed in Kankakee, Illinois in 1900–1901.

== History ==
B. Harley Bradley and his wife, Anna Hickox Bradley, were the brother-in-law and sister of Warren Hickox, of the Warren Hickox House, located next to the Bradley House. The Bradley House and the Willits House, also built in 1901 in Highland Park, Illinois and designed by Wright, compete for the title of the first Prairie School residence designed by Wright and built to his specifications.

Harley Bradley had inherited means from his grandfather, a local manufacturer of plowshares and other farm and garden implements. The Bradley House is a 12,000-square-foot (1,100 m^{2}) residential space that includes a 6,000-square-foot (560 m^{2}) residence, a 3,000-square-foot (280 m^{2}) basement, and a 3,000 square-foot stable space connected to the main building by a breezeway. Tours are available for a fee, and the house's current owner, the nonprofit group Wright in Kankakee, has refitted the stable to serve as a gift shop.

The "Prairie Style" is so named because Wright, the style's pioneer architect, worked with his clients to develop architectural spaces that were inspired by the wide, horizontal landscape and natural plant forms of the tallgrass prairie that surrounded Kankakee. This mirroring theme was especially suited to the fenestration of the buildings constructed in this style. USA Today commented that the house, "reveals what would become his hallmark: long rows of windows, stained glass, and a low-pitched roofline." 82 of the Bradley House's original 90 art glass windows survive. The home, as completed, included fittings and furnishings designed or chosen by Wright. Much of the Bradley family fortune used to build and fit out the house had come from the implements used to plow up the prairie sod that is celebrated by the house.

The B. Harley Bradley House was listed in the National Register of Historic Places as part of the Riverview Historic District on August 22, 1986. On June 2, 2009, it was individually recognized by the National Park Service with a listing.

== See also ==
- List of Frank Lloyd Wright works
- National Register of Historic Places listings in Kankakee County, Illinois
