= Pope Brace Company Building =

- U.S. National Register of Historic Places
- Location within Illinois Location within the United States
- Location: 197 S. West Ave., Kankakee, Illinois
- Coordinates: 41°07′10″N 87°51′59″W
- Built: 1922
- NRHP reference No.: 100006866
- Added to NRHP: September 1, 2021

The Pope Brace Company Building is a historic industrial building at 197 South West Avenue in Kankakee, Illinois. The building was constructed in 1922 for the Paramount Knitting Company, which was founded in Kankakee in 1893 by Henry Pope Sr. It originally housed the Paramount Textile Machinery Company, a subsidiary of the knitting company which manufactured and fixed its machinery, and the experimental division of Bear Brand Hosiery, its most popular product line. After Pope's daughter Margaret was diagnosed with polio, he established the Pope Brace Company to develop an improved leg brace for her and other polio patients, and it conducted its research in the building. The company developed the Klenzak brace, which was named for machinist John Klenzak; its use of hollow steel made it both lighter and more affordable. Pope's work introduced him to future U.S. President Franklin D. Roosevelt in 1926, whose physician team convinced him to explore hydrotherapy treatments for polio. This led to the company building the Hubbard Tank, a mass-produced hydrotherapy tank named for engineer Carl Hubbard. The company continued to manufacture these devices and other medical equipment in the building until 1979, when their operations were moved to South Carolina.

The building was added to the National Register of Historic Places on September 1, 2021.
