= Point School =

- U.S. National Register of Historic Places
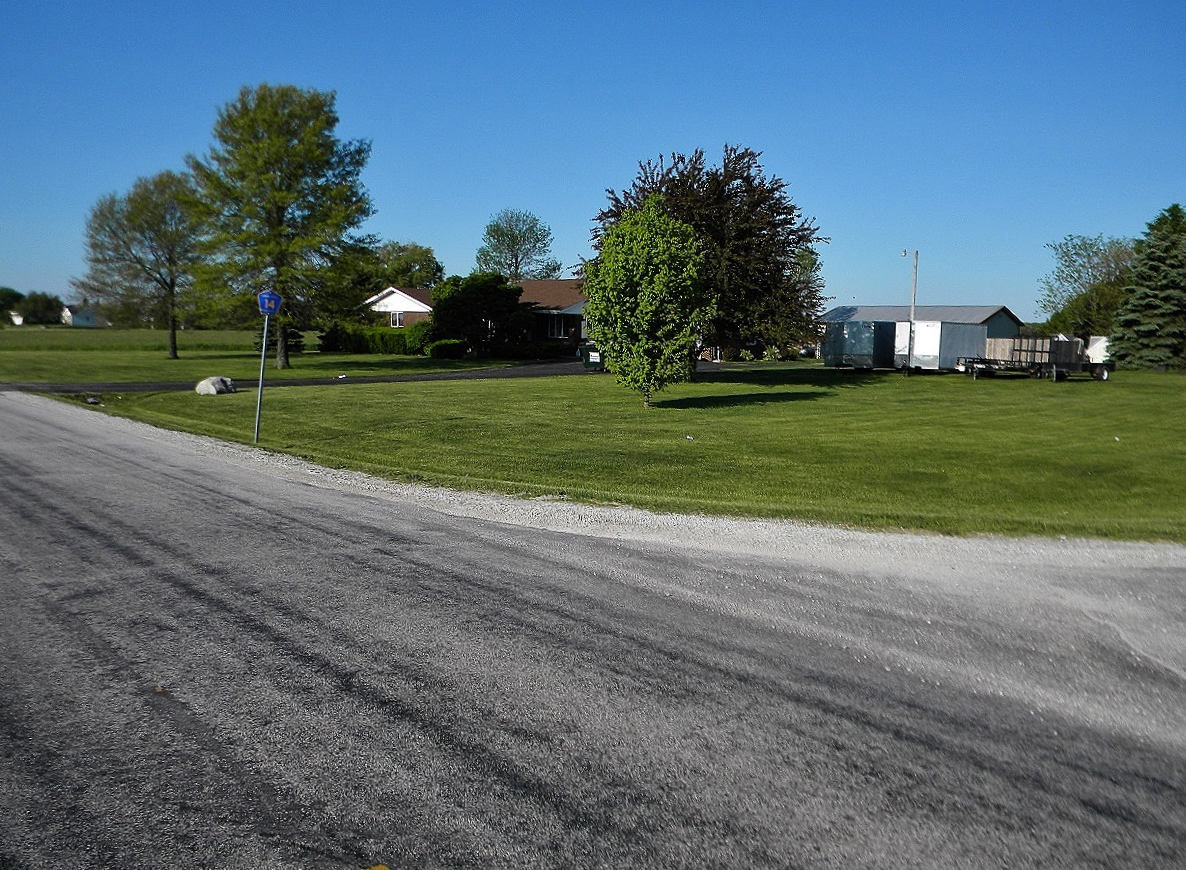
- Site of the school

- Location within Illinois
- Location: 6976 N. Vincennes Trail, Grant Park, Illinois
- Coordinates: 41°13′22″N 87°37′53″W
- Area: less than one acre
- Built: 1854
- Architectural style: One-room school
- NRHP reference No.: 92001539
- Added to NRHP: November 5, 1992

Point School was a one-room schoolhouse was located at 6976 N. Vincennes Trail near Grant Park, Illinois. The school was built in 1854 to serve Yellowhead Township District #8, one of nine school districts in the county. As was typical of Midwestern one-room schoolhouses, the school was a white rectangular frame building; it featured a gable front and three windows along each of the sides. The school operated until 1948, when it was closed due to school consolidation in the area. While Kankakee County once had 151 one-room schoolhouses, an Illinois Historic Preservation Agency survey in 1992 determined that the Point School was one of only three one-room schoolhouses that still stood at its original site and had not been significantly altered.

The school was added to the National Register of Historic Places on November 5, 1992. It is no longer standing at its original site but owned / preserved by the Grant Park Area Historical Society. It can be seen in its preserved condition at 307 W. Taylor St., Grant Park, Illinois, 60940.
