= Kankakee County Courthouse =

Local government building in the United States

- U.S. National Register of Historic Places
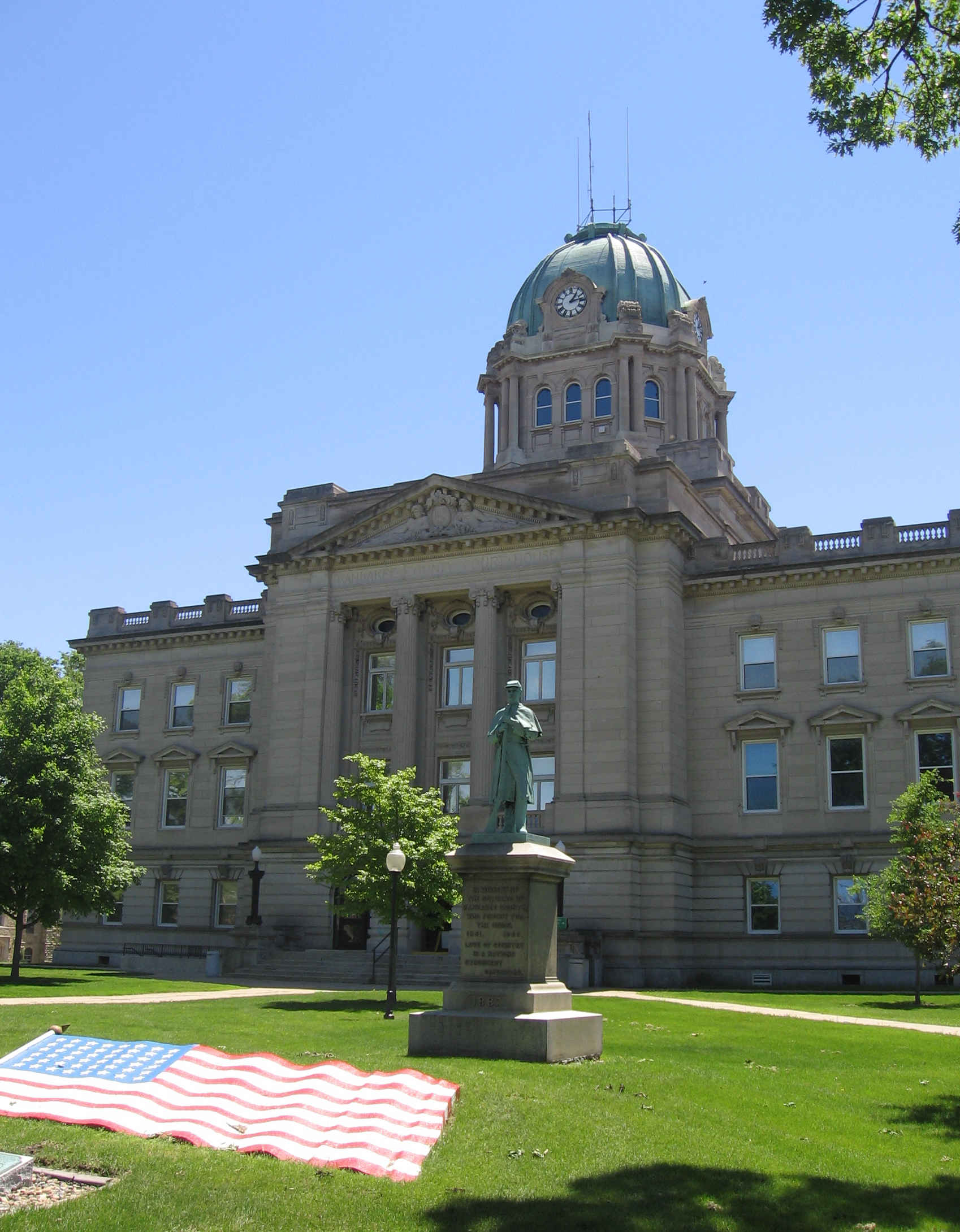

- Location within Illinois Location within the United States
- Interactive map showing the location of Kankakee County Courthouse
- Location: 450 E. Court St., Kankakee, Illinois)
- Coordinates: 41°7′9″N 87°51′37″W
- Area: 2.9 acres (1.2 ha)
- Built by: W. F. Stilwell
- Architect: Zachary Taylor Davis
- Architectural style: Beaux Arts, Renaissance Revival
- NRHP reference No.: 07000115
- Added to NRHP: March 7, 2007

The Kankakee County Courthouse in Courthouse Square is a historic building in Kankakee, Illinois, United States that has been home to the government of Kankakee County since 1912. The current structure, the third county courthouse, took three years to build and is considered a fine example of Beaux-Arts architecture.

== History ==
The area now known as Courthouse Square in Kankakee, Illinois was originally used by the Potawatomi as a council ground. European settlement began in 1832 with the Treaty of Camp Tippecanoe. In 1851, the Illinois Central Railroad decided to build a station in what is now Kankakee. The Associates Land Company, formed by supporters of the Illinois Central, purchased and platted the land around the station, calling it Kankakee Depot. When Kankakee County was formed in 1853, Kankakee Depot competed with Momence to be named county seat. The influence of the Associates Land Company, who offered to donate a large block of land and $5000 for a courthouse, swayed voters to select Kankakee Depot as seat.

The first Kankakee County Courthouse was built shortly thereafter. The three-story building became a social center and trading place in addition to its capacities in county government. Stephen A. Douglas gave a speech in front of the courthouse during his 1858 Senate Campaign. On May 17, 1861, it was home to Kankakee County's only case of capital punishment when an African-American man was hanged from the second floor for the murder of a white girl. On October 5, 1872, the courthouse was destroyed in a fire. The limestone walls were cleaned and re-used in the second courthouse. The new courthouse was built to similar specification as the first. The main difference was the cupola, which was railed higher than the first. The courthouse opened in October 1873.

By the 1900s, it was evident that the county courthouse was too small for the county's use. The county population had recently grown to 37,000, an increase of 8,000 over the previous decade. In November 1908, voters approved the construction of a new courthouse, the current structure. Zachary Taylor Davis was awarded the commission for the building. It was built by Lafayette, Indiana contractor W. F. Stilwell for $187,000. Construction began on October 2, 1909, and finished in July 1912. In the 1930s, a protest with 200 farmers gathered at the courthouse to demand changes in property tax laws so that they would be paid after the harvest. By 1950, the population of the county exceeded 73,500 thanks to an industrial boom in the late 1940s.

The courthouse has remained in use since its 1912 opening. On March 7, 2007, the building was recognized by the National Park Service with a listing on the National Register of Historic Places.

A shooting took place at this courthouse on the morning of August 26, 2021, where an unknown shooter killed 2 and injured 1. According to Mayor Christopher Curtis, the suspect has been apprehended.
