= Zachary Taylor Davis =

American architect (1869–1946)

- Born: May 26, 1869; Aurora, Illinois, U.S.
- Died: December 16, 1946 (aged 77); Chicago, Illinois, U.S.
- Known for: Architect

Zachary Taylor Davis (May 26, 1869 – December 16, 1946) was the architect of several major Chicago buildings, including St. Ambrose Church (1904) Comiskey Park (1910), Wrigley Field (1914), Mount Carmel High School (1924), and St. James Chapel of Archbishop Quigley Preparatory Seminary (1918).

== Biography ==
Davis was born in Aurora, Illinois, and graduated from the Chicago School of Architecture at Armour Institute (later Illinois Institute of Technology). After graduating he began a six-year apprenticeship, part of which was spent as a draftsman for Louis Sullivan—along with another aspiring architect, Frank Lloyd Wright. After his work with Adler and Sullivan, Davis began his career as supervising architect for Armour & Company. Later, in 1900, Davis started an independent firm with his brother Charles.

In 1909, he designed the third Kankakee County Courthouse. A year later, he was hired by Charles Comiskey to design White Sox Park, later known as Comiskey Park. To prepare for the project, Davis toured ballparks around the country with White Sox pitcher Ed Walsh. In 1914, he was hired by the Chicago Whales to design Weeghman Park, which would later become Wrigley Field. Davis was also involved with the design of the original Yankee Stadium.

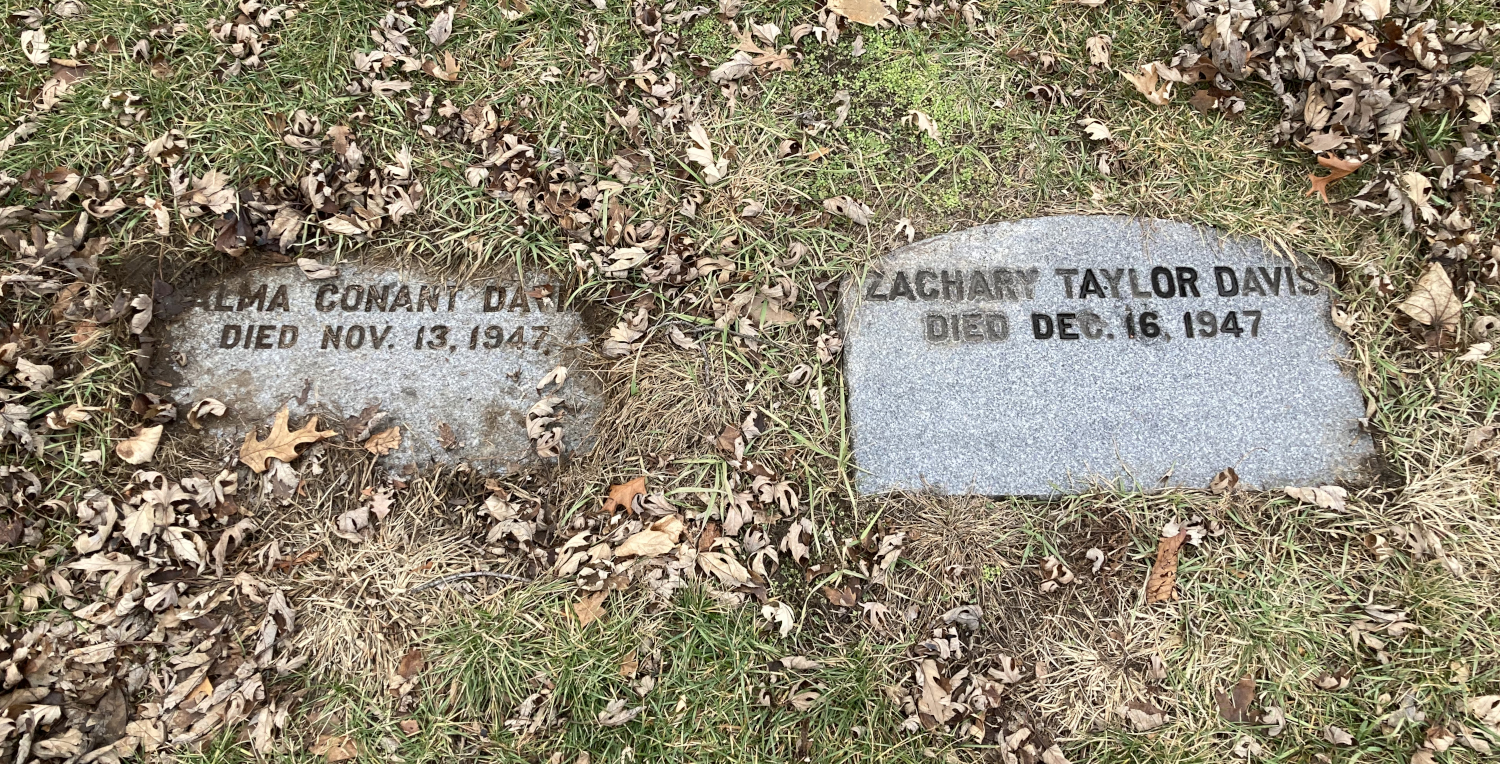
Graves of Alma Conant and Zachary Taylor Davis at Mount Olivet Cemetery (the year of their deaths were erroneously inscribed as "1947")

For most of his career, Davis worked out of his offices in the Unity Building in Chicago's Loop. He lived quietly with his family at his home at 45th and Drexel in Kenwood, Chicago. One architectural historian called Davis "one of the most significant lost architects in Chicago." He died at Mercy Hospital in Chicago on December 16, 1946, and was buried at Mount Olivet Cemetery. The various newspaper obituaries state he was age 74, which would suggest a birth year of 1872. The 1900 US Census gives his age as 31 and birth month and year as May 1869. Subsequent censuses are inconsistent. For example, the 1940 census, dated April 11, a month before his birthday, gives his age as 67, which again would suggest a birth year of 1872.

Davis and his wife, Alma C. Davis, had their first child in 1898. Zachary Taylor Davis II worked as a salesman for Monsanto Company and died of a heart attack on August 11, 1938, at his home in Evanston, Illinois, survived by his wife, Mary (née Ryan) and seven-year-old son, Zachary Taylor Davis III.

Davis and Alma also had two other sons, David and Lawrence, and a daughter, Mary Louise, who married Charles Allison.

Alma died on November 13, 1946, a month before Davis himself.

== Ballparks ==
Known as the "Frank Lloyd Wright of baseball", Davis was one of the first architects to design ballparks with innovative steel-beam and concrete construction. Before his design of Comiskey Park, Chicago ballparks were wooden structures with minimal capital investment. This allowed both Chicago teams to move frequently and also meant that demolition of the old parks was inexpensive. Davis's designs and their more solid construction ended this trend in Chicago.

When Comiskey Park needed to be expanded, in part to accommodate fans of the visiting Babe Ruth, Davis oversaw the renovations. He also oversaw the expansion of Wrigley Field in 1922.

In 1925, Wrigley Field (Los Angeles) opened, also designed by Davis. With Davis commissioned by Chicago Cubs owner William Wrigley Jr., the Los Angeles ballpark was patterned after Wrigley Field in Chicago and was primarily the home to the Los Angeles Angels, a minor league affiliate of the Chicago Cubs.
