= Momence, Illinois =

Momence
- City
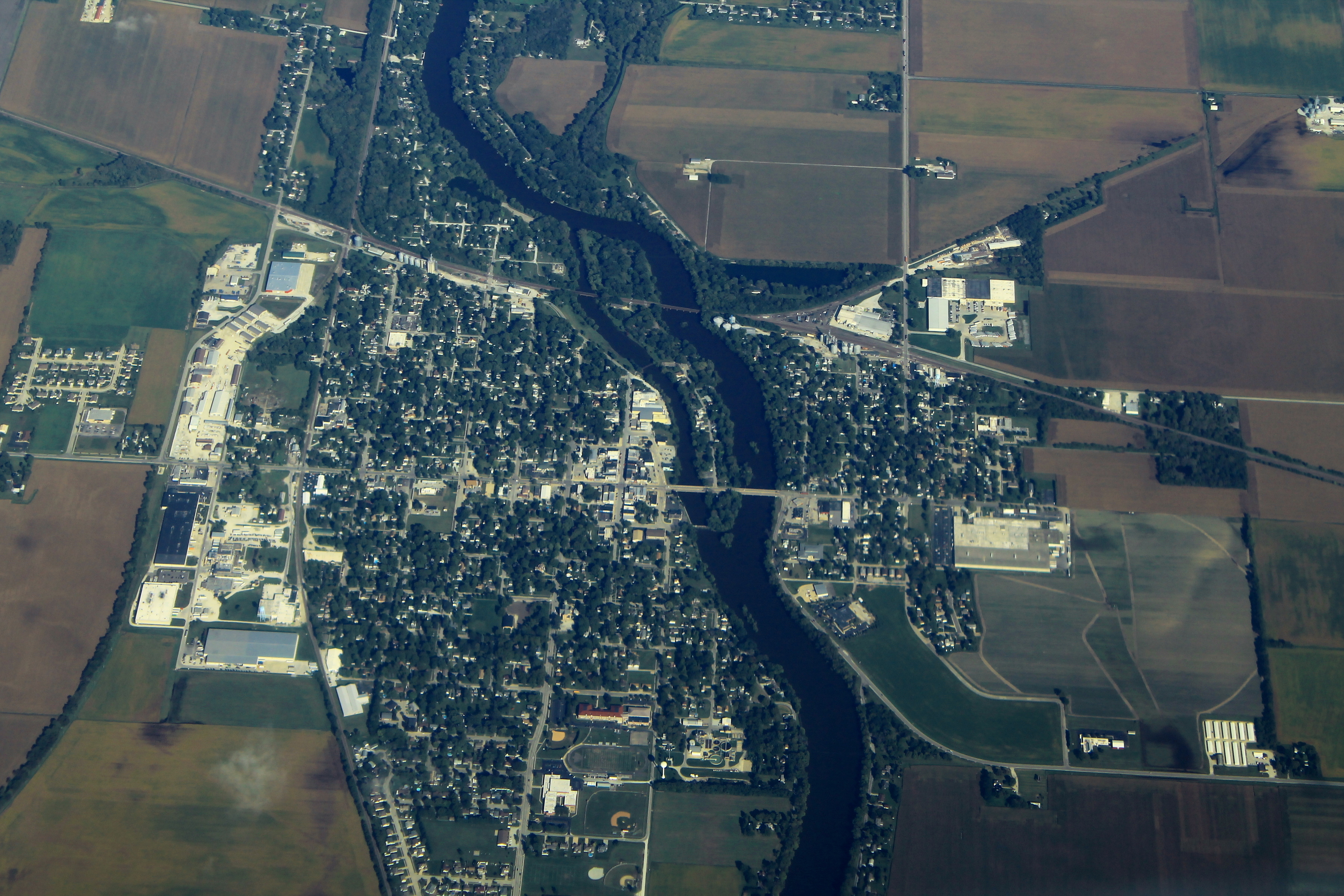
- Aerial view of Momence

- Location of Momence in Illinois

- Location of Illinois in the United States
- Coordinates: 41°09′50″N 87°39′47″W
- Country: United States
- State: Illinois
- County: Kankakee

Government
  - Mayor: Charles Steele

Area
  - Total: 1.67 sq mi (4.32 km^{2})
  - Land: 1.57 sq mi (4.06 km^{2})
  - Water: 0.097 sq mi (0.25 km^{2})
- Elevation: 623 ft (190 m)

Population (2020)
  - Total: 3,117
  - Density: 1,986.7/sq mi (767.07/km^{2})
- Time zone: UTC-6 (CST)
  - Summer (DST): UTC-5 (CDT)
- ZIP Code(s): 60954
- Area code: 815
- FIPS code: 17-49893
- GNIS feature ID: 2395368
- Wikimedia Commons: Momence, Illinois
- Website: http://cityofmomence.com

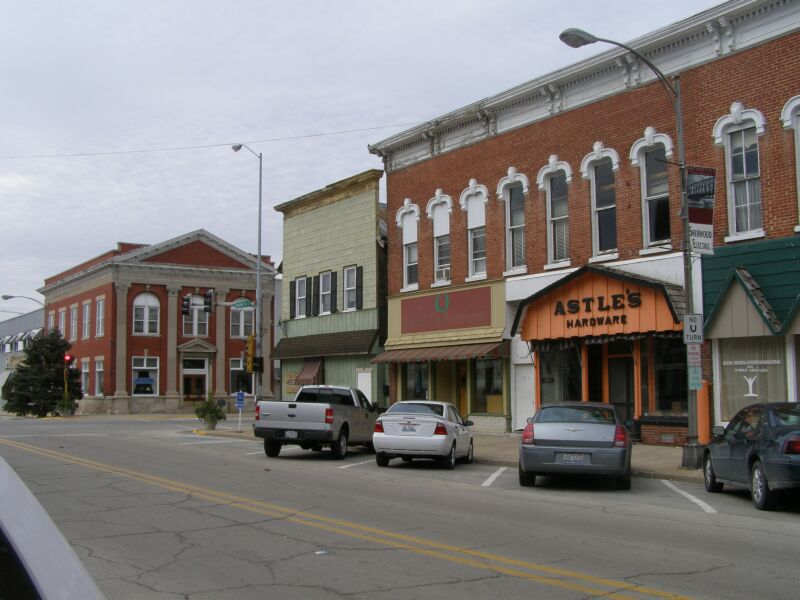
Downtown of Momence

Momence is a city in Momence Township, Kankakee County, Illinois, United States. Its population was 3,117 at the 2020 census. It is part of the Kankakee–Bradley metropolitan statistical area.

== History ==
First known as "Lower Crossing", Momence was named after a local Potawatomi, Isadore Moness. Momence was first platted by Dr. Hiram Todd in 1846. It is located on the Kankakee River. In July, 1893, a crew paid for by an appropriation from the neighboring State of Indiana cut a shallow channel not quite a meter deep through a limestone ledge running just east of Momence, which had for millennia partially blocked and restricted the flow of the Kankakee River, making up to that point the Grand Kankakee Marsh, then the nation's largest inland wetland, possible. The increased river flow, while doing little for the citizens of Illinois, drained thousands of acres of Indiana wetlands, permitting them to be profitably farmed, while destroying most of the marsh.

== Geography ==
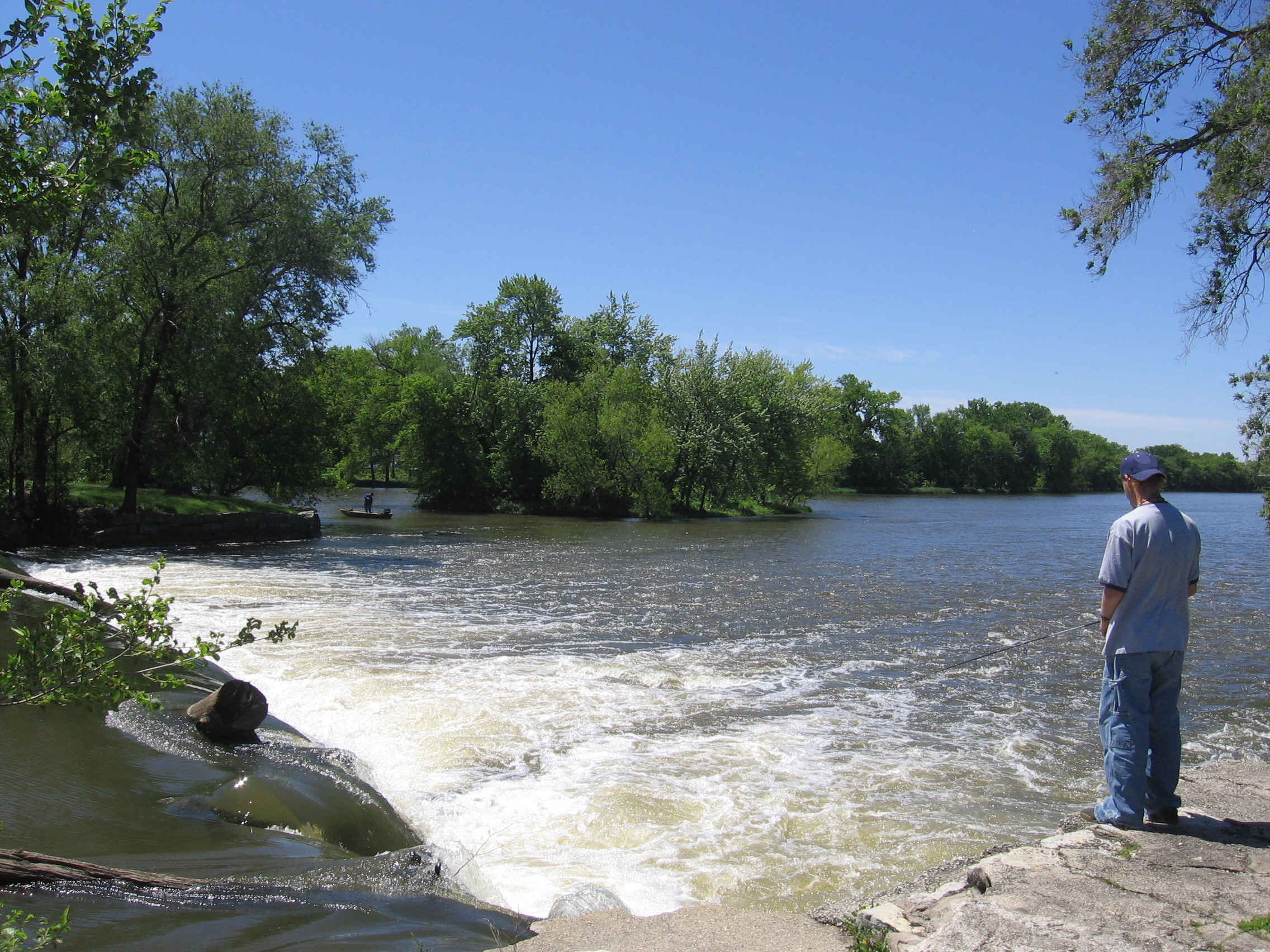
Fishing on the Kankakee River at Momence.

According to the 2021 census gazetteer files, Momence has a total area of 1.67 square miles (4.33 km^{2}), of which 0.10 sq mi (0.26 km^{2}) (or 5.82%) is covered by water.

== Demographics ==
Historical population
Census	Pop.	Note	%±
1880	1,037		—
1890	1,635		57.7%
1900	2,026		23.9%
1910	2,201		8.6%
1920	2,218		0.8%
1930	2,236		0.8%
1940	2,425		8.5%
1950	2,644		9.0%
1960	2,949		11.5%
1970	2,836		−3.8%
1980	3,297		16.3%
1990	2,968		−10.0%
2000	3,171		6.8%
2010	3,310		4.4%
2020	3,117		−5.8%
U.S. Decennial Census

=== 2020 census ===
As of the 2020 census, Momence had a population of 3,117. There were 1,182 households and 598 families in the city. The population density was 1,870.95 inhabitants per square mile (722.38/km^{2}), and the 1,268 housing units had an average density of 761.10 per square mile (293.86/km^{2}).

The median age was 37.8 years. 24.4% of residents were under the age of 18 and 16.8% were 65 years of age or older. For every 100 females there were 101.6 males, and for every 100 females age 18 and over there were 97.8 males age 18 and over.

0.0% of residents lived in urban areas, while 100.0% lived in rural areas.

Of all households, 32.6% had children under the age of 18 living in them. 42.3% were married-couple households, 19.3% were households with a male householder and no spouse or partner present, and 30.5% were households with a female householder and no spouse or partner present. About 27.6% of all households were made up of individuals, and 12.6% had someone living alone who was 65 years of age or older.

Of housing units, 6.8% were vacant. The homeowner vacancy rate was 2.1% and the rental vacancy rate was 5.0%.

Racial composition as of the 2020 census
Race	Number	Percent
White	2,183	70.0%
Black or African American	152	4.9%
American Indian and Alaska Native	37	1.2%
Asian	19	0.6%
Native Hawaiian and Other Pacific Islander	1	0.0%
Some other race	409	13.1%
Two or more races	316	10.1%
Hispanic or Latino (of any race)	739	23.7%

=== Income and poverty ===
The median income for a household in the city was $45,188, and for a family was $61,500. Males had a median income of $37,115 versus $19,292 for females. The per capita income for the city was $21,984. About 2.8% of families and 11.8% of the population were below the poverty line, including 8.6% of those under 18 and 6.8% of those 65 or over.

== Notable people ==
- Jeremy Michael Boorda, U.S. Navy admiral and chief of Naval Operations
- Don Bacon, Republican member of the United States House of Representatives for Nebraska
- Eddie Condon, jazz musician, was raised in Momence
- William Crook (1925–1997), US ambassador to Australia
- Orbert Davis, jazz trumpeter and bandleader
- Janet Hubert, actress, appeared in the original Broadway cast of Cats
- Ted Petersen, offensive lineman for various teams
- Malcolm Ross, atmospheric scientist, and balloonist, born in Momence
- John D. Zeglis, president of AT&T and the chairman and CEO of AT&T Wireless

== Transportation ==
SHOW Bus provides bus service between Momence and Kankakee on weekdays.

== Pop culture ==
- Downtown Momence served as a setting for scenes in the 2002 movie, Road to Perdition.
- Momence's downtown and neighborhood also served as the setting for the fourth season of Fargo, starring Chris Rock.
- Significant filming location in the third season of Netflix's Monster, which tackled on the Serial Killer Ed Gein
