= Kankakee, Illinois =

- City
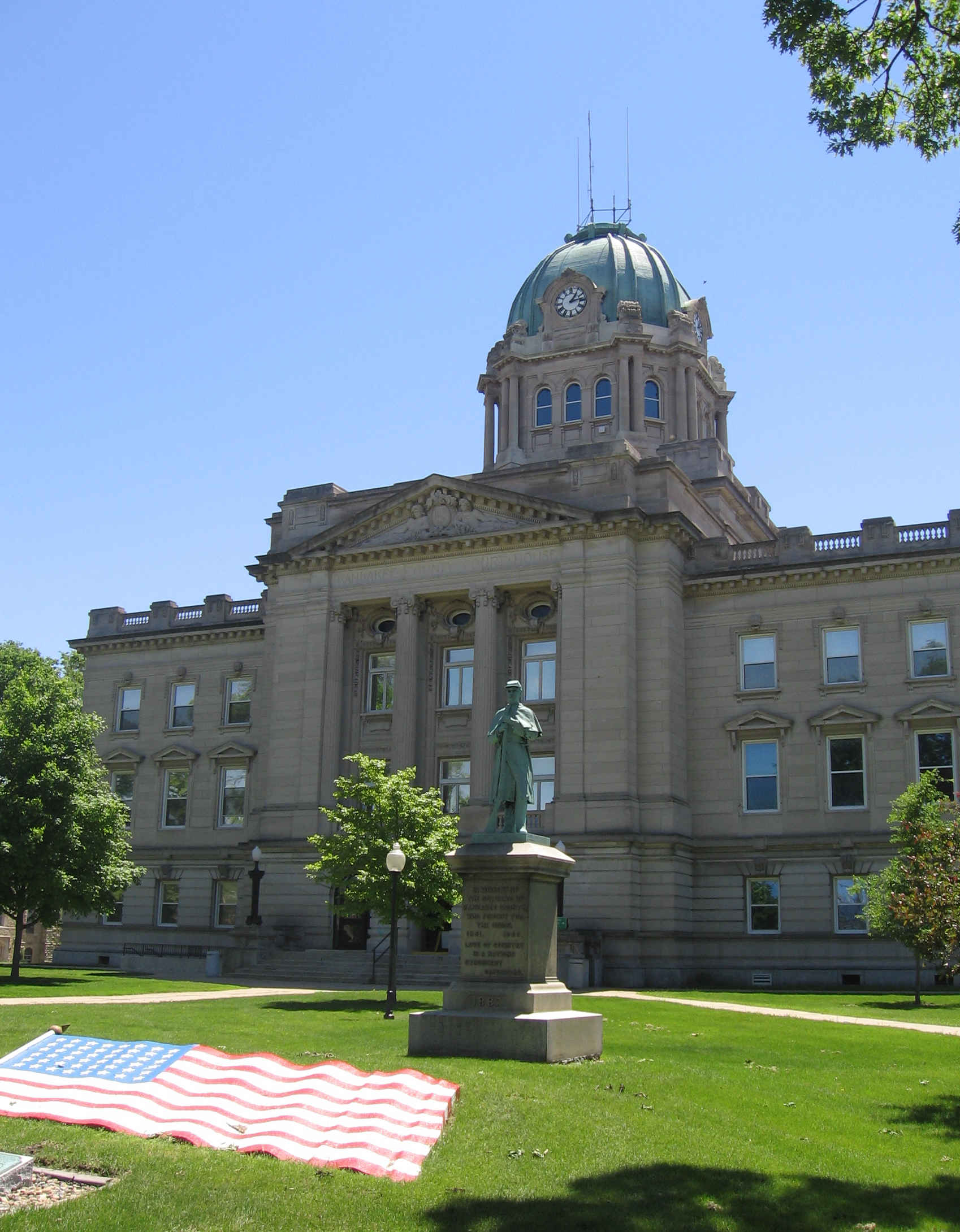
- Kankakee County Courthouse

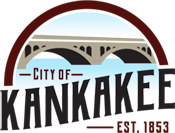
- Logo
- Interactive map of Kankakee, Illinois
- Location within Illinois Location within the United States
- Coordinates: 41°07′12″N 87°51′40″W
- Country: United States
- State: Illinois
- County: Kankakee
- Established: 1853
- Incorporated (city): 1865

Government
  - Type: Mayor–council
  - Mayor: Chris Curtis (R)
  - City Council: 14 aldermen

Area
  - Total: 15.61 sq mi (40.44 km^{2})
  - Land: 15.14 sq mi (39.20 km^{2})
  - Water: 0.48 sq mi (1.24 km^{2})
- Elevation: 617 ft (188 m)

Population (2020)
  - Total: 24,052
  - Estimate (2025): 23,400
  - Density: 1,589.0/sq mi (613.51/km^{2})
- Demonym: Kankakeean
- Time zone: UTC−6 (CST)
  - Summer (DST): UTC−5 (CDT)
- ZIP Code: 60901
- Area codes: 815, 779
- FIPS code: 17-38934
- GNIS feature ID: 2395489
- Website: citykankakee-il.gov

Kankakee (/ˌkæŋkəˈkiː/ KANG-kə-KEE) is a city in and the county seat of Kankakee County, Illinois, United States. Located on the Kankakee River, as of 2020, the city's population was 24,052. Kankakee is a principal city of the Kankakee-Bourbonnais-Bradley Metropolitan Statistical Area. It serves as an anchor city in the rural plains outside Chicago.

== History ==
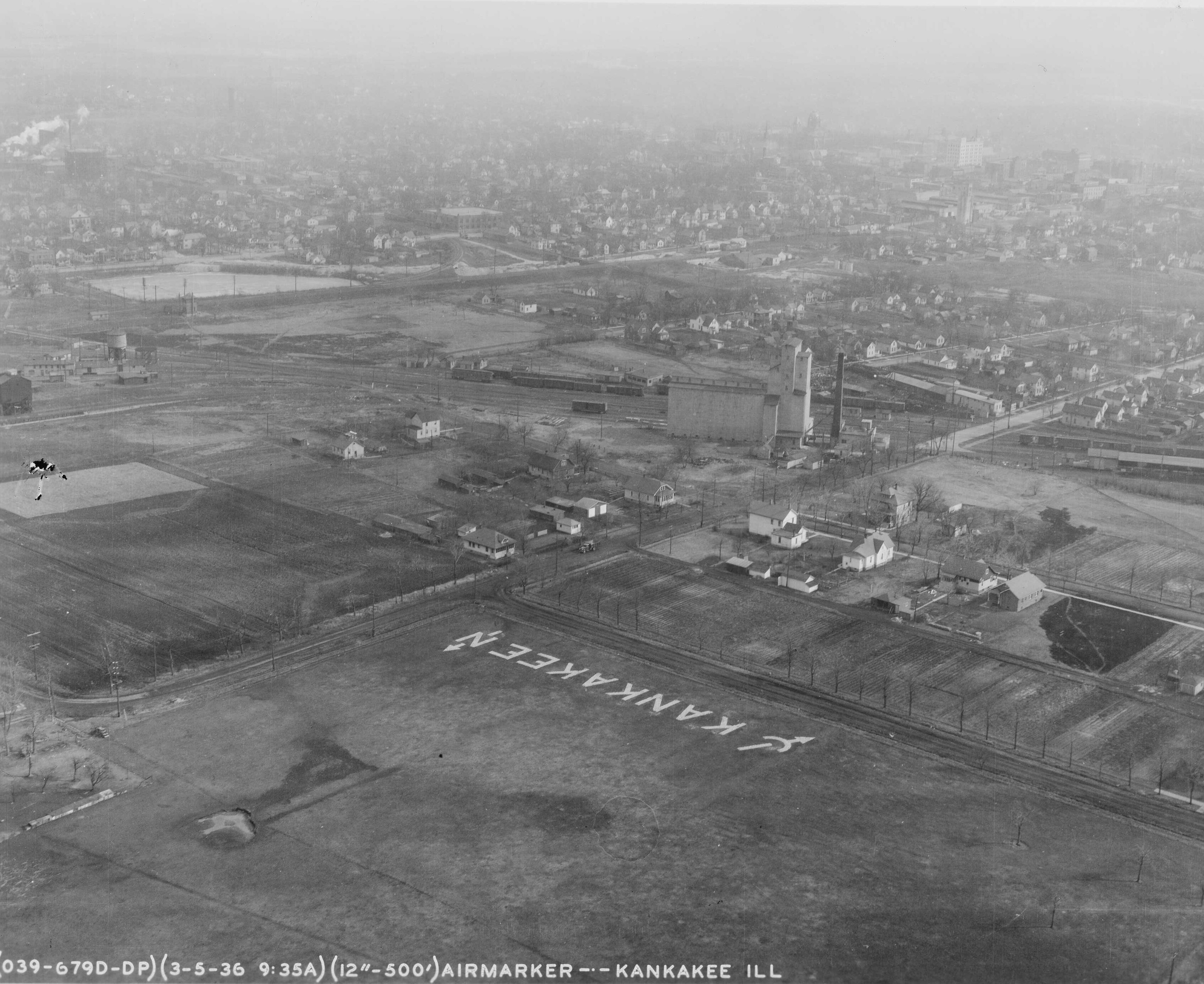
Kankakee in 1936

The city's name is probably derived from a corrupted version of the Miami-Illinois word teeyaahkiki, meaning "open country/exposed land/land in open/land exposed to view", in reference to the area's prior status as a marsh. Kankakee was founded in 1854.

On March 10, 2026, a high-end EF3 tornado struck the south side of Kankakee, with winds up to 160 miles per hour (260 km/h).

== Geography ==
According to the 2021 census gazetteer files, Kankakee has a total area of 15.54 square miles (40.25 km^{2}), of which 15.06 square miles (39.01 km^{2}), or 96.92%, is land and 0.48 square miles (1.24 km^{2}), or 3.08%, is water.

The Kankakee River runs through Kankakee. It is approximately 133 miles (214 km) long and serves as a major attraction and defining landmark of Kankakee. The river water is refined at the Kankakee Water Company, and electricity is generated at the Kankakee River Dam, providing vital resources to the community. Its winding path, including inlets and eddies, creates desirable fishing conditions for outdoor enthusiasts.

=== Climate ===
Climate data for Kankakee, Illinois (1991–2020 normals, extremes 1887–present)
Month	Jan	Feb	Mar	Apr	May	Jun	Jul	Aug	Sep	Oct	Nov	Dec	Year
Record high °F (°C)	66 (19)	74 (23)	85 (29)	91 (33)	99 (37)	103 (39)	103 (39)	107 (42)	99 (37)	90 (32)	79 (26)	71 (22)	107 (42)
Mean daily maximum °F (°C)	32.5 (0.3)	36.8 (2.7)	48.6 (9.2)	61.2 (16.2)	72.5 (22.5)	81.9 (27.7)	84.8 (29.3)	83.2 (28.4)	77.9 (25.5)	65.1 (18.4)	49.9 (9.9)	37.8 (3.2)	61.0 (16.1)
Daily mean °F (°C)	24.4 (−4.2)	28.2 (−2.1)	39.0 (3.9)	50.3 (10.2)	61.8 (16.6)	71.5 (21.9)	74.8 (23.8)	73.1 (22.8)	66.5 (19.2)	54.1 (12.3)	41.0 (5.0)	30.0 (−1.1)	51.2 (10.7)
Mean daily minimum °F (°C)	16.3 (−8.7)	19.7 (−6.8)	29.4 (−1.4)	39.4 (4.1)	51.0 (10.6)	61.0 (16.1)	64.8 (18.2)	63.0 (17.2)	55.1 (12.8)	43.1 (6.2)	32.1 (0.1)	22.1 (−5.5)	41.4 (5.2)
Record low °F (°C)	−29 (−34)	−21 (−29)	−7 (−22)	8 (−13)	27 (−3)	38 (3)	46 (8)	39 (4)	30 (−1)	18 (−8)	1 (−17)	−26 (−32)	−29 (−34)
Average precipitation inches (mm)	2.37 (60)	1.94 (49)	2.49 (63)	3.87 (98)	5.15 (131)	5.21 (132)	4.65 (118)	3.85 (98)	3.56 (90)	3.40 (86)	2.82 (72)	2.35 (60)	41.66 (1,058)
Average snowfall inches (cm)	8.1 (21)	3.4 (8.6)	3.0 (7.6)	0.3 (0.76)	0.0 (0.0)	0.0 (0.0)	0.0 (0.0)	0.0 (0.0)	0.0 (0.0)	0.0 (0.0)	0.6 (1.5)	5.3 (13)	20.7 (53)
Average precipitation days (≥ 0.01 in)	10.7	8.6	9.1	10.9	11.7	10.1	8.6	8.6	7.6	9.2	9.0	9.0	113.1
Average snowy days (≥ 0.1 in)	5.6	4.2	1.9	0.4	0.0	0.0	0.0	0.0	0.0	0.0	0.7	3.5	16.3
Source: NOAA

== Demographics ==
Historical population
Census	Pop.	Note	%±
1880	5,651		—
1890	9,025		59.7%
1900	13,595		50.6%
1910	13,986		2.9%
1920	16,753		19.8%
1930	20,620		23.1%
1940	22,241		7.9%
1950	25,856		16.3%
1960	27,666		7.0%
1970	27,575		−0.3%
1980	29,633		7.5%
1990	30,944		4.4%
2000	27,491		−11.2%
2010	27,537		0.2%
2020	24,052		−12.7%
2025 (est.)	23,400		−2.7%
U.S. Decennial Census; 2010 2020

=== Racial and ethnic composition ===
Kankakee city, Illinois – racial and ethnic composition Note: the US Census treats Hispanic/Latino as an ethnic category. This table excludes Latinos from the racial categories and assigns them to a separate category. Hispanics/Latinos may be of any race.
Race / ethnicity (NH = non-Hispanic)	Pop 2000	Pop. 2010	Pop. 2020	% 2000	% 2010	% 2020
White alone (NH)	13,130	10,432	8,096	47.76%	37.88%	33.66%
Black or African American alone (NH)	11,216	11,128	9,233	40.80%	40.41%	38.39%
Native American or Alaska Native alone (NH)	58	54	62	0.21%	0.20%	0.26%
Asian alone (NH)	86	175	116	0.31%	0.64%	0.48%
Native Hawaiian or Pacific Islander alone (NH)	7	3	3	0.03%	0.01%	0.01%
Other race alone (NH)	49	39	107	0.18%	0.14%	0.44%
Mixed race or multiracial (NH)	401	599	916	1.46%	2.18%	3.81%
Hispanic or Latino (any race)	2,544	5,107	5,519	9.25%	18.55%	22.95%
Total	27,491	27,537	24,052	100.00%	100.00%	100.00%

=== 2020 census ===
As of the 2020 census, Kankakee had a population of 24,052 and 9,204 households, including 5,627 families.

The population density was 1,548.25 inhabitants per square mile (597.78/km^{2}). There were 10,600 housing units, of which 13.2% were vacant; the homeowner vacancy rate was 3.8% and the rental vacancy rate was 11.1%.

The median age was 36.6 years. 25.6% of residents were under the age of 18, 9.1% were from 18 to 24, 27.5% were from 25 to 44, 23.6% were from 45 to 64, and 15.1% were 65 years of age or older. For every 100 females there were 94.9 males, and for every 100 females age 18 and over there were 93.4 males age 18 and over.

Of the city's 9,204 households, 32.1% had children under the age of 18 living in them, 30.2% were married-couple households, 23.2% had a male householder with no spouse or partner present, and 38.1% had a female householder with no spouse or partner present. About 34.7% of households were made up of individuals, and 14.1% had someone living alone who was 65 years of age or older.

About 99.8% of residents lived in urban areas, while 0.2% lived in rural areas.

== Arts and culture ==
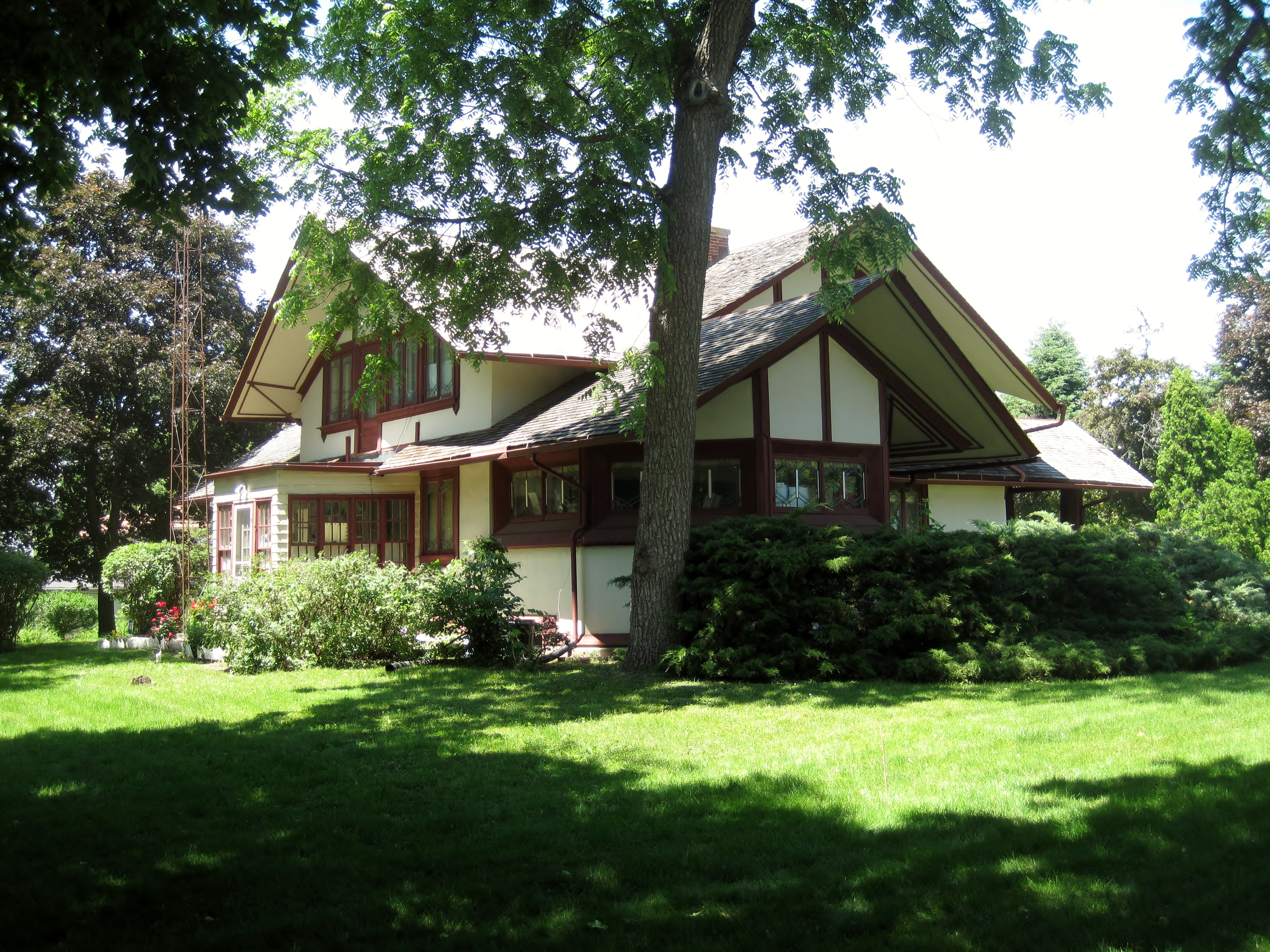
Warren Hickox House

Library service is provided by the Kankakee Public Library.

=== Architecture ===
- Frank Lloyd Wright designed two houses in the Riverview section of the city, located on South Harrison Avenue. The B. Harley Bradley House and the Warren Hickox House both still stand today.
- The current Kankakee courthouse was built from 1909 to 1912 in the Neo-classical Revivalist style in the wake of the 1893 Columbian Exposition (the Chicago World's Fair) as part of the City Beautiful movement. The architect was Zachary Taylor Davis, who had previously worked with Frank Lloyd Wright when both were draftsmen for Louis Sullivan.

== Parks and recreation ==
=== Kankakee Valley Park District ===
Kankakee Valley Park District has 37 parks, comprising a total of 600 acres (2.4 km^{2}). Facilities include an indoor ice skating rink, a recreation center, dog park, campground and a 72 boat slip marina on the Kankakee River. Fishing is plentiful as the district has 13 riverfront parks as well as a 5-acre (2.0 ha) stocked quarry.

The city has two softball complexes that have both been inducted into the Softball Hall of Fame. They host annual state and international tournaments drawing nearly 50,000 spectators throughout the year. Some Kankakee youth baseball leagues have won state championships.

== Government ==
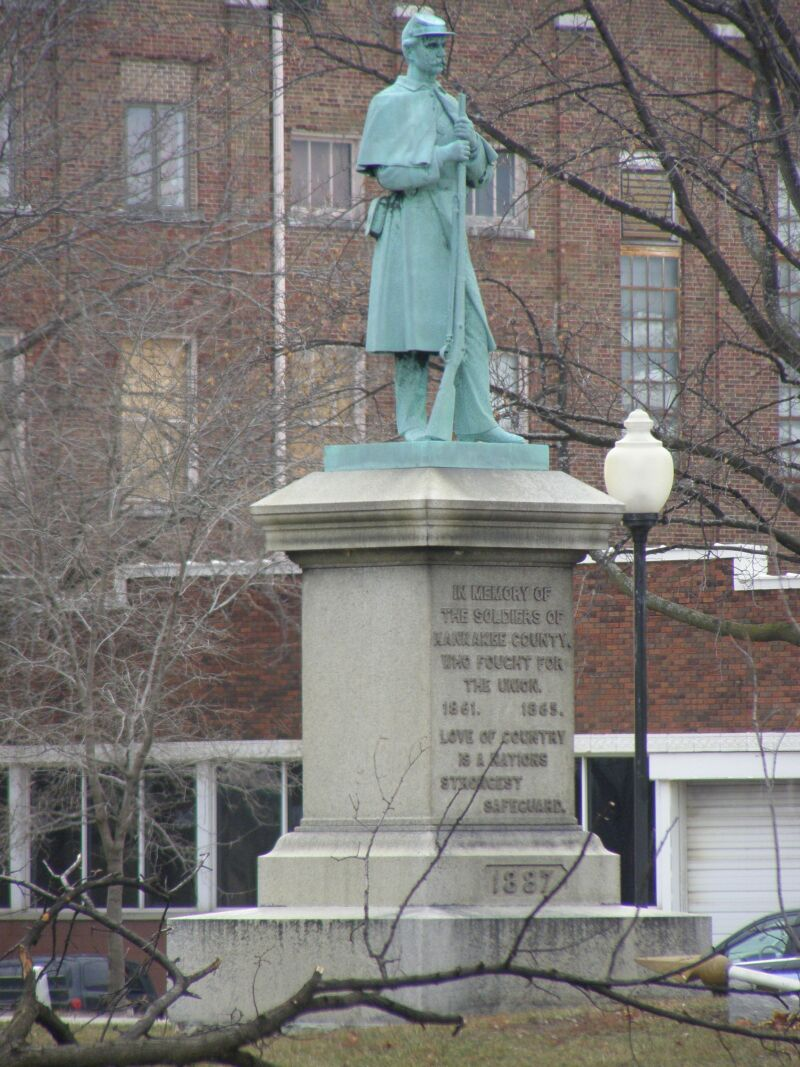
Civil War Memorial by the courthouse

Kankakee is governed by the mayor council system. The city council consists of fourteen members who are elected from seven wards (two per ward). The mayor and city clerk are elected in a citywide vote.

== Education ==
=== Higher education ===
Organized in 1966 by a group of citizens, Kankakee Community College was established to provide a post-secondary educational resource for the people of the Kankakee area.

=== Primary and secondary education ===
Public schools are part of the Kankakee School District 111, which includes five elementary schools (Edison, Mark Twain, Lincoln Cultural Center Montessori, Steuben, and Taft), two middle schools (Kennedy and King), one junior high school (Kankakee Junior High), and one high school (Kankakee High), which from 1966 to 1983 was two separate high schools, Eastridge and Westview.

There are three private high schools: Bishop McNamara Catholic School (Catholic), Grace Christian Academy (non-denominational), and Kankakee Trinity Academy (inter-denominational).

== Infrastructure ==
=== Transportation ===
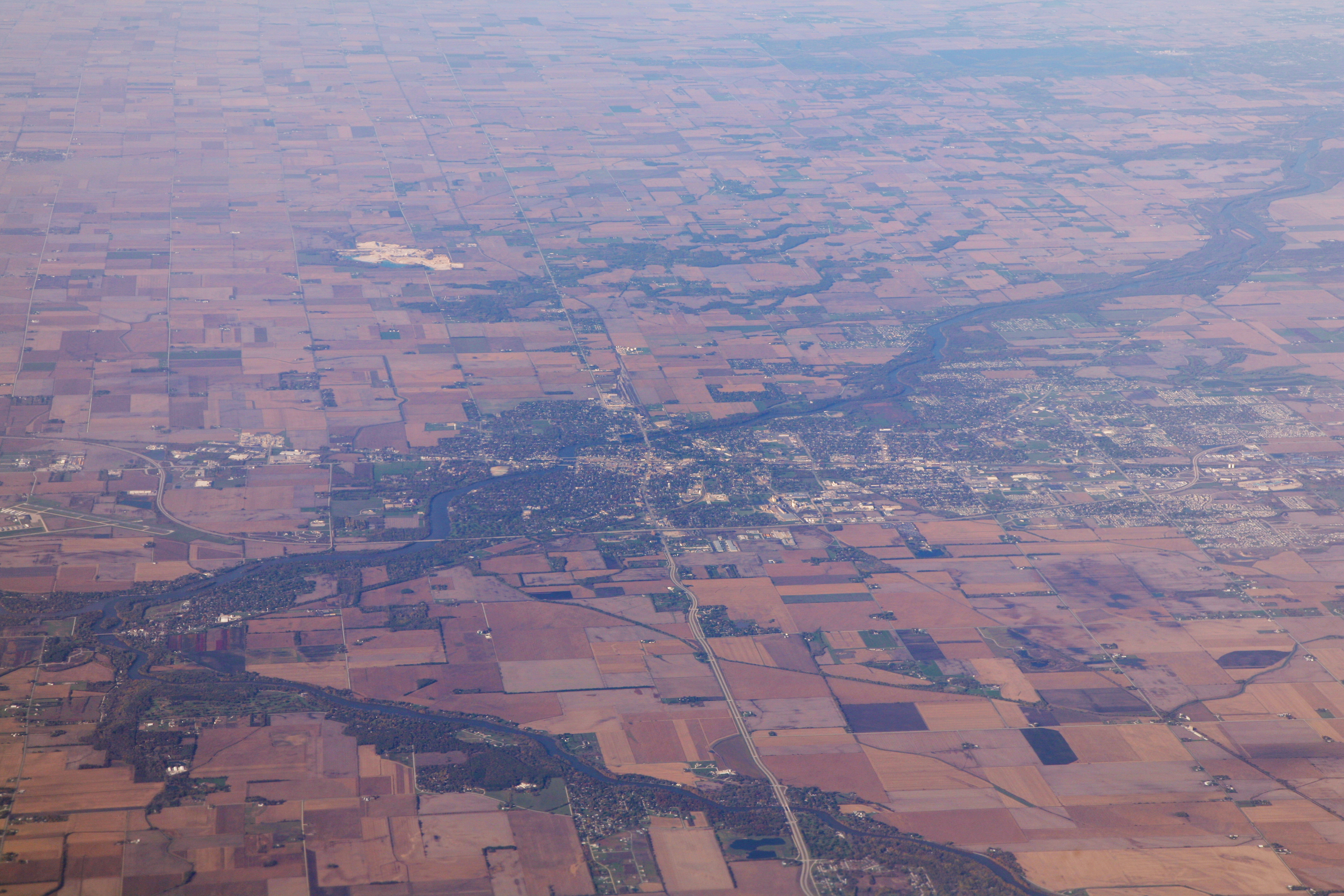
Aerial view of Kankakee. The confluence of Iroquois River and Kankakee River is visible on the left edge of the frame.

==== Airport ====
Kankakee is served by the Greater Kankakee Airport, a general aviation facility located in the southern portion of Kankakee.

==== Railroads ====
Amtrak provides service to Kankakee from the Kankakee Amtrak Station. Amtrak operates the City of New Orleans, the Illini, and the Saluki, which each run once daily in both directions.

==== Highways ====
Interstate 57 runs east–west in the southern part of the city and turns north–south in the eastern part of Kankakee. United States Highways US 45 and US 52 run concurrently forming, along with Illinois State Route 50, the major north–south thoroughfares through Kankakee. Illinois State Route 17 is the major east–west road that bisects the city.

==== Public transportation ====
The River Valley Metro Mass Transit District (RVMMTD; River Valley Metro or METRO, for short) operates the region's transit bus system. Service runs seven days a week to locations in Kankakee as well as the nearby cities of Aroma Park, Bradley, Bourbonnais, and Manteno. All of the Kankakee routes are stationed out of the Chestnut & North Schuyler Transfer Station. River Valley Metro operates 12 fixed-regular bus routes and two commuter routes. The Midway and University Park commuter routes were added January 5, 2014; in August 2015, River Valley Metro added a second Midway route to its schedule. In January 2016, a second University Park route was added.

== In popular culture ==
- The movie The Accountant (2016) showcases Kankakee by directly mentioning the town as well as displaying Kankakee High School hats on some of the actors.
- The movie The Unborn (2009) was partially filmed in Samuel H. Shapiro Developmental Center in Kankakee. Other movies to have been filmed in Kankakee County are The Hunter (1980) and Child's Play (1988).
- Kankakee is mentioned in several songs:
  - "Innocent Bessie Brown", words and music by Irving Berlin, written in 1910, sung by the Broadway performer Ethel Green
  - "City of New Orleans", words and music by Steve Goodman
  - "Lydia the Tattooed Lady", words and music by Yip Harburg and Harold Arlen. This song first appeared in the Marx Brothers movie At the Circus (1939) and became one of Groucho Marx's signature tunes.
  - "Took Her to the O" by Chicago rapper King Von
- In 1999, the city was mocked on the Late Show with David Letterman after being named America's worst place to live. As a gag, Letterman donated two gazebos to the city in the hopes it would proclaim itself as "The home of the world famous twin gazebos." In 2015, one of the gazebos was torn down. A rocking chair was built from the wood, and was sent to Letterman for his retirement. This was organized by Kankakee students who felt the gazebos were symbols of a past they wanted to forget.
- On April 10, 2015, This American Life analyzed Kankakee and its title of the worst city in America.

== See also ==
- Kankakee Outwash Plain
- List of people from Kankakee
