= 2010 Indianapolis Colts season =

58th season in franchise history; final one with Peyton Manning

- Owner: Jim Irsay
- General manager: Chris Polian
- Head coach: Jim Caldwell
- Offensive coordinator: Clyde Christensen
- Defensive coordinator: Larry Coyer
- Home stadium: Lucas Oil Stadium

Results
- Record: 10–6
- Division place: 1st AFC South
- Playoffs: Lost Wild Card Playoffs (vs. Jets) 16–17
- Pro Bowlers: QB Peyton Manning; WR Reggie Wayne; DE Dwight Freeney; DE Robert Mathis

Uniform
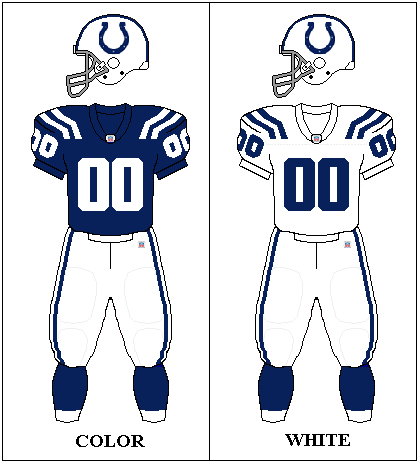

The 2010 season was the Indianapolis Colts' 58th in the National Football League (NFL), their 27th in Indianapolis, their third playing their home games at Lucas Oil Stadium, and their second under head coach Jim Caldwell. They were looking to defend their AFC Championship title and win it all in Super Bowl XLV to end their four-year championship drought. It was also the final season with Peyton Manning as the team's starting quarterback, as he would sit out the next season due to a neck injury and would be released by Indianapolis on March 7, 2012. Manning's last game as a Colt was on January 8, 2011, a 17–16 loss to the New York Jets in the Wild Card Round and would sign with the Denver Broncos a year later, on March 20, 2012.

The Colts also clinched their ninth consecutive postseason appearance, tying the then all-time record for consecutive postseason appearances by a team with the Dallas Cowboys, who made the playoffs every season from 1975 to 1983. Though the Colts failed to win 12 or more games for the first time since 2002, the team did win the AFC South division title for the seventh time in eight seasons, but were eliminated narrowly in the Wild Card Round by the Jets.

== Offseason ==
=== Additions ===
Pos.	Player	Date	Notes
G	Andy Alleman	March 6, 2010	Signed with Colts
OL	Gerald Cadogan	January 20, 2010	Signed with Colts
DL	John Chick	January 8, 2010	Signed with Colts
WR	Dudley Guice	January 6, 2010	Signed with Colts
DL	Mitch King	January 23, 2010	Signed with Colts
CB	Terrail Lambert	February 14, 2010	Signed with Colts
WR	John Matthews	February 14, 2010	Signed with Colts
RB	Devin Moore	January 14, 2010	Signed with Colts
LB	Brandon Renkart	February 14, 2010	Signed with Colts
DE	J. D. Skolnitsky	March 9, 2010	Signed with Colts
WR	Taj Smith	February 14, 2010	Signed with Colts
OT	Adam Terry	March 12, 2010	Signed with Colts
OL	Jaimie Thomas	February 14, 2010	Signed with Colts
QB	Drew Willy	February 14, 2010	Signed with Colts

=== Departures ===
Pos.	Player	Date released	Date signed	2010 team	Notes
DT	Raheem Brock	March 5, 2010	August 12, 2010	Seahawks	Released by Colts, later signed by Seahawks.
WR	Roy Hall	May 3, 2010	May 12, 2010	Saints	Released by Colts, later signed by Saints.
DE	Rudolph Hardie	May 4, 2010			Released by Colts.
G	Ryan Lilja	March 8, 2010	March 16, 2010	Chiefs	Released by Colts, later signed by Chiefs.
TE	Jamie Petrowski	May 4, 2010	May 18, 2010	Panthers	Released by Colts, later signed by Panthers.
RB	Chad Simpson	April 10, 2010	May 11, 2010	Bills	Released by Colts, later signed by Bills.
QB	Jim Sorgi	March 5, 2010	March 9, 2010	Giants	Released by Colts, later signed by Giants.

=== Free agents ===
Pos.	Player	Free agency tag	Date signed	2010 team	Notes
WR	Hank Baskett	UFA	March 12, 2010	Eagles	Colts declined to tender an offer. Later signed by Eagles.
FS	Antoine Bethea	RFA	June 11, 2010	Colts	Colts offered a first–round tender. Re-signed with Colts.
LB	Gary Brackett	UFA	March 5, 2010	Colts	Re–signed with Colts.
SS	Melvin Bullitt	RFA	April 14, 2010	Colts	Colts offered a second–round tender. Re–signed with Colts.
OL	Daniel Federkeil	UFA			Colts declined to tender an offer.
FS	Aaron Francisco	UFA	April 12, 2010	Panthers	Colts declined to tender an offer. Later signed by Panthers. Re-signed by Colts as SS.
LB	Tyjuan Hagler	UFA	August 10, 2010	Seahawks	Colts declined to tender an offer. Later signed by Seahawks.
CB	Marlin Jackson	UFA	March 10, 2010	Eagles	Colts declined to tender an offer. Later signed by Eagles.
CB	Tim Jennings	UFA	March 16, 2010	Bears	Colts declined to tender an offer. Later signed by Bears.
DT	Antonio Johnson	RFA	April 17, 2010	Colts	Colts offered a second–round tender. Re–signed with Colts.
OT	Charlie Johnson	RFA	April 21, 2010	Colts	Colts offered a second–round tender. Re–signed with Colts.
LB	Freddy Keiaho	UFA	April 27, 2010	Jaguars	Colts declined to tender an offer. Later signed by Jaguars.
DT	Daniel Muir	RFA	April 14, 2010	Colts	Colts offered a second–round tender. Re–signed with Colts.
CB	T. J. Rushing	UFA	August 18, 2010	Lions	Colts declined to tender an offer. Later signed by Lions.
K	Matt Stover	UFA			Colts declined to tender an offer.
OT	Michael Toudouze	UFA	August 10, 2010	Titans	Colts declined to tender an offer. Later signed by Titans.
UFA: Unrestricted free agent; RFA: Restricted free agent; ERFA: Exclusive rights free agent

== 2010 NFL draft ==
Having finished the season as the runner–up in the Super Bowl, the Colts held the 31st pick in each round. They had previously traded their sixth–round pick to the Philadelphia Eagles for a seventh–round pick in the 2009 NFL draft.

Indianapolis Colts 2010 NFL Draft selections
Draft order			Player	Position	Height	Weight	College	Contract	Notes
Round	Choice	Overall	Player	Position	Height	Weight	College	Contract	Notes
1	31	31	Jerry Hughes	DE	6 ft 1 in (1.85 m)	255 lb (116 kg)	TCU		
2	31	63	Pat Angerer	ILB	6 ft 1 in (1.85 m)	235 lb (107 kg)	Iowa		
3	30	94	Kevin Thomas	CB	6 ft 1 in (1.85 m)	190 lb (86 kg)	USC		
4	31	129	Jacques McClendon	G	6 ft 3 in (1.91 m)	324 lb (147 kg)	Tennessee		
5	31	162	Brody Eldridge	TE	6 ft 5 in (1.96 m)	265 lb (120 kg)	Oklahoma		
6	31	200	Traded to the Philadelphia Eagles						
7	31	238	Ricardo Mathews	DL	6 ft 3 in (1.91 m)	294 lb (133 kg)	Cincinnati		
7	33	240	Kavell Conner	OLB	6 ft 0 in (1.83 m)	240 lb (109 kg)	Clemson		Compensatory selection
7	39	246	Ray Fisher	CB/KR	5 ft 9 in (1.75 m)	185 lb (84 kg)	Indiana		Compensatory selection

=== Undrafted free agents ===
2010 undrafted free agents of note
Player	Position	College
David Caldwell	Safety	William & Mary
Jeffrey Linkenbach	Guard	Cincinnati
Brett Swenson	Kicker	Michigan State
Blair White	Wide Receiver	Michigan State

== Staff and roster ==
=== Staff ===
Indianapolis Colts 2010 staff
Front office: Owner/CEO – Jim Irsay; President – Bill Polian; Vice president/general manager – Chris Polian; Director of football administration – Steve Champlin; Director of player personnel – Tom Telesco; Director of pro player personnel – Clyde Powers; Associate director of pro personnel – Kevin Rogers; Head coaches: Head coach – Jim Caldwell; Offensive coaches: Senior offensive assistant – Tom Moore; Offensive coordinator – Clyde Christensen; Quarterbacks – Frank Reich; Running backs – Gene Huey; Wide receivers – Ron Turner; Tight ends – Ricky Thomas; Offensive line – Pete Metzelaars; Assistant offensive line – Ron Prince; Offensive assistant – Jim Bob Cooter	Defensive coaches: Defensive coordinator – Larry Coyer; Defensive line – John Teerlinck; Linebackers – Mike Murphy; Defensive backs – Alan Williams; Special assistant to the defense – Rod Perry; Defensive assistant – Bill Teerlinck; Special teams coaches: Special teams coordinator – Ray Rychleski; Strength and conditioning: Strength and conditioning – Jon Torine; Assistant strength and conditioning – Richard Howell

=== Final roster ===
2010 Indianapolis Colts roster
Quarterbacks (QB): 18 Peyton Manning; 7 Curtis Painter; Running backs (RB): 29 Joseph Addai; 31 Donald Brown; 32 Mike Hart; 42 Javarris James; 30 Dominic Rhodes KR; Wide receivers (WR): 85 Pierre Garçon; 10 Taj Smith; 87 Reggie Wayne; 15 Blair White PR; Tight ends (TE): 81 Brody Eldridge; 47 Gijon Robinson; 84 Jacob Tamme	Offensive linemen (OL): 66 Kyle DeVan G; 71 Ryan Diem T; 74 Charlie Johnson T; 72 Jeff Linkenbach G/T; 65 Jacques McClendon G; 78 Mike Pollak G; 61 Jamey Richard G; 63 Jeff Saturday C; 73 Jaimie Thomas G; 75 Michael Toudouze T; Defensive linemen (DL): 96 Keyunta Dawson DE; 68 Eric Foster DE; 93 Dwight Freeney DE; 92 Jerry Hughes DE; 99 Antonio Johnson DT; 91 Ricardo Mathews DT; 98 Robert Mathis DE; 95 Fili Moala DT; 90 Daniel Muir DT	Linebackers (LB): 51 Pat Angerer; 58 Gary Brackett MLB; 53 Kavell Conner OLB; 56 Tyjuan Hagler OLB; 55 Clint Session OLB; 54 Nate Triplett; 50 Philip Wheeler OLB; Defensive backs (DB): 23 Al Afalava FS; 41 Antoine Bethea FS; 39 Cornelius Brown CB; 43 Aaron Francisco SS; 35 Ken Hamlin FS; 26 Kelvin Hayden CB; 27 Jacob Lacey CB; 38 Mike Newton SS; 37 Mike Richardson CB; 20 Justin Tryon CB; Special teams (ST): 1 Pat McAfee P; 48 Justin Snow LS; 4 Adam Vinatieri K	Practice squad: 83 Chris Brooks WR; 97 John Chick DE; 36 John Destin S; 13 Kole Heckendorf WR; 39 Terrence Johnson CB; 86 Rob Myers TE; 76 Joe Reitz T; 60 James Williams T; Reserve: 33 Melvin Bullitt SS (IR); -- David Caldwell SS (IR); 44 Dallas Clark TE (IR); 17 Austin Collie WR (IR); 69 John Gill DT (NF-Ill.); 52 Cody Glenn MLB (IR); 11 Anthony Gonzalez WR (IR); -- Jordan Hemby CB (IR); 37 Brandon King FS/CB (IR); 45 Devin Moore RB (IR); 25 Jerraud Powers CB (IR); 21 Bob Sanders SS (IR); -- Tom Santi TE (IR); 40 Jamie Silva SS (IR); 2 Brett Swenson K (IR); -- Kevin Thomas CB (IR); 49 Chip Vaughn FS (IR); Rookies in italics 53 active, 17 reserve, 8 practice squad

== Preseason ==
Week	Date	Opponent	Result	Record	Venue	Recap
1	August 15	San Francisco 49ers	L 17–37	0–1	Lucas Oil Stadium	Recap
2	August 19	at Buffalo Bills	L 21–34	0–2	(Canada) Rogers Centre (Toronto)	Recap
3	August 26	at Green Bay Packers	L 24–59	0–3	Lambeau Field	Recap
4	September 2	Cincinnati Bengals	L 28–30	0–4	Lucas Oil Stadium	Recap

== Regular season ==
=== Schedule ===
Week	Date	Opponent	Result	Record	Venue	Recap
1	September 12	at **Houston Texans**	**L** 24–34	0–1	Reliant Stadium	Recap
2	September 19	New York Giants	**W** 38–14	1–1	Lucas Oil Stadium	Recap
3	September 26	at Denver Broncos	**W** 27–13	2–1	Invesco Field at Mile High	Recap
4	October 3	at **Jacksonville Jaguars**	**L** 28–31	2–2	EverBank Field	Recap
5	October 10	Kansas City Chiefs	**W** 19–9	3–2	Lucas Oil Stadium	Recap
6	October 17	at Washington Redskins	**W** 27–24	4–2	FedExField	Recap
7	Bye					
8	November 1	**Houston Texans**	**W** 30–17	5–2	Lucas Oil Stadium	Recap
9	November 7	at Philadelphia Eagles	**L** 24–26	5–3	Lincoln Financial Field	Recap
10	November 14	Cincinnati Bengals	**W** 23–17	6–3	Lucas Oil Stadium	Recap
11	November 21	at New England Patriots	**L** 28–31	6–4	Gillette Stadium	Recap
12	November 28	San Diego Chargers	**L** 14–36	6–5	Lucas Oil Stadium	Recap
13	December 5	Dallas Cowboys	**L** 35–38 (OT)	6–6	Lucas Oil Stadium	Recap
14	December 9	at **Tennessee Titans**	**W** 30–28	7–6	LP Field	Recap
15	December 19	**Jacksonville Jaguars**	**W** 34–24	8–6	Lucas Oil Stadium	Recap
16	December 26	at Oakland Raiders	**W** 31–26	9–6	Oakland–Alameda County Coliseum	Recap
17	January 2	**Tennessee Titans**	**W** 23–20	10–6	Lucas Oil Stadium	Recap

Note: Intra-division opponents are in bold text.

=== Standings ===
AFC South
	W	L	T	PCT	DIV	CONF	PF	PA	STK
^{(3)} Indianapolis Colts	10	6	0	.625	4–2	8–4	435	388	W4
Jacksonville Jaguars	8	8	0	.500	3–3	7–5	353	419	L3
Houston Texans	6	10	0	.375	3–3	4–8	390	427	W1
Tennessee Titans	6	10	0	.375	2–4	3–9	356	339	L2

=== Game summaries ===
==== Week 1: at Houston Texans ====
Week 1: Indianapolis Colts at Houston Texans – Game summary

Quarter	1	2	3	4	Total
Colts	0	10	0	14	**24**
**Texans**	6	7	7	14	**34**

at Reliant Stadium, Houston, Texas

- Date: September 12
- Game time: 12:00 p.m. CDT
- Game weather: None (retractable roof closed)
- Game attendance: 70,974
- Referee: Ed Hochuli
- TV announcers (CBS): Greg Gumbel and Dan Dierdorf
- Recap

Game information

**First quarter**

- HOU – Neil Rackers 30-yard field goal, Texans 3–0, **Drive: 9 plays, 19 yards, 3:40.**
- HOU – Neil Rackers 49-yard field goal, Texans 6–0, **Drive: 4 plays, 53 yards, 1:19.**

**Second quarter**

- HOU – Kevin Walter 22-yard pass from Matt Schaub (Neil Rackers kick), Texans 13–0, **Drive: 7 plays, 80 yards, 3:44.**
- IND – Reggie Wayne 14-yard pass from Peyton Manning (Adam Vinatieri kick), Texans 13–7, **Drive: 7 plays, 35 yards, 2:53.**
- IND – Adam Vinatieri 20-yard field goal, Texans 13–10, **Drive: 11 plays, 63 yards, 3:35.**

**Third quarter**

- HOU – Arian Foster 1-yard run (Neil Rackers kick), Texans 20–10, **Drive: 15 plays, 66 yards, 7:57.**

**Fourth quarter**

- HOU – Arian Foster 25-yard run (Neil Rackers kick), Texans 27–10, **Drive: 4 plays, 91 yards, 1:57.**
- IND – Dallas Clark 10-yard pass from Peyton Manning (Adam Vinatieri kick), Texans 27–17, **Drive: 12 plays, 75 yards, 3:49.**
- HOU – Arian Foster 8-yard run (Neil Rackers kick), Texans 34–17, **Drive: 7 plays, 41 yards, 2:56.**
- IND – Austin Collie 73-yard pass from Peyton Manning (Adam Vinatieri kick), Texans 34–24, **Drive: 2 plays, 77 yards, 0:41.**

**Top passers**

- IND – Peyton Manning – 40/57, 433 yards, 3 touchdowns
- HOU – Matt Schaub – 9/17, 107 yards, 1 touchdown, 1 interception

**Top rushers**

- IND – Joseph Addai – 10 rushes, 44 yards
- HOU – Arian Foster – 33 rushes, 231 yards, 3 touchdowns

**Top receivers**

- IND – Austin Collie – 11 receptions, 163 yards, 1 touchdown
- HOU – Andre Johnson – 3 receptions, 33 yards

The Colts began their season at Reliant Stadium in an AFC South duel against the Houston Texans. Indianapolis started the season going 3-and-out on their first offensive possession of the new year. The Texans got good field position with a big punt return from Jacoby Jones to set up a 30-yard field goal to give them a 3–0 lead. The offense continued to struggle throughout the first half, getting two first downs on the next drive, however, eventually having to punt. The Texans continued to show energy on both offense and defense by scoring two more time, a field goal and a touchdown, giving the Texans a 13–0 lead halfway through the second quarter. The Colts eventually got the offense going late in the second quarter by scoring on a touchdown reception by Reggie Wayne, which broke the lead down to one possession. Adam Vinatieri made a 20-yard field goal at the end of the first half and the Colts went into the half trailing 13–10. The momentum was seemingly shifting to Indianapolis, until Houston took almost eight minutes off the third quarter clock on a 15-play drive, 13 rushes, that resulted in one of Arian Foster's rushing touchdowns on the day to give Houston a 20–10 lead. Peyton Manning and the offense struggled throughout the third quarter with missed opportunities and continued to shoot themselves in the foot with penalties. With the start of the fourth quarter Houston scored another touchdown and broke the game open. The Colts would eventually score two touchdowns late in the game, only when there was no chance of a comeback.

With the final score 34–24, the Colts were 0–1 to start a season for the first time since 2008, when they lost to the Chicago Bears.

==== Week 2: vs. New York Giants ====
Week 2: New York Giants at Indianapolis Colts – Game summary

Quarter	1	2	3	4	Total
Giants	0	0	7	7	**14**
**Colts**	7	17	7	7	**38**

at Lucas Oil Stadium; Indianapolis, Indiana

- Date: September 19
- Game time: 8:20 PM EDT
- Game weather: 74 °F (23 °C) (Clear)
- Game attendance: 67,275
- Referee: Bill Leavy
- TV announcers (NBC): Al Michaels, Cris Collinsworth and Andrea Kremer
- Recap

Game information

**First quarter**

- IND – (8:21) Donald Brown 7-yard run (Adam Vinatieri kick), **Drive: 12 plays, 80 yards, 6:44.** (Colts 7–0)

**Second quarter**

- IND – (9:43) Dallas Clark 50-yard reception from Peyton Manning (Adam Vinatieri kick), **Drive: 8 plays, 98 yards, 4:24.** (Colts 14–0)
- IND – (5:05) Adam Vinatieri 38-yard field goal, **Drive: 8 plays, 42 yards, 4:26.** (Colts 17–0)
- IND – (0:14) Austin Collie 3-yard reception from Peyton Manning (Adam Vinatieri kick), **Drive: 8 plays, 45 yards, 0:58.** (Colts 24–0)

**Third quarter**

- NYG – (10:53) Mario Manningham 54-yard reception from Eli Manning (Lawrence Tynes kick), **Drive: 8 plays, 87 yards, 4:16.** (Colts 24–7)
- IND – (6:35) Fili Moala 1-yard fumble return (Adam Vinatieri kick), (Colts 31–7).

**Fourth quarter**

- IND – (9:18) Reggie Wayne 10-yard reception from Peyton Manning (Adam Vinatieri kick), **Drive: 8 plays, 55 yards, 4:02.** (Colts 38–7)
- NYG – (1:52) Hakeem Nicks 31-yard reception from Eli Manning (Lawrence Tynes kick), **Drive: 1 plays, 31 yards, 0:00.** (Colts 38–14)

**Top passers**

- NYG – Eli Manning – 13/24, 161 yards, 2 TD, 1 INT
- IND – Peyton Manning – 20/26, 255 yards, 3 TD, 0 INT

**Top rushers**

- NYG – Ahmad Bradshaw – 17 carries, 89 yards, 0 TD
- IND – Joseph Addai – 20 carries, 92 yards, 0 TD

**Top receivers**

- NYG – Mario Manningham – 4 receptions, 75 yards, 1 TD
- IND – Reggie Wayne – 7 receptions, 96 yards, 1 TD

The 2010 meeting between the Indianapolis Colts and the New York Giants marked the second time that the two quarterback brothers of Peyton and Eli Manning met in a football game, the last coming in 2006. The game started out good early for the Colts with a running touchdown from Donald Brown and two separate stops by the defense against the Giants. As the second quarter began the Colts kept rolling on the offensive side of the ball. Two touchdown passes during the second quarter and a field goal from Adam Vinatieri helped the Colts extend a halftime lead of 24–0. With the start of the third quarter the Giants came out and scored early on a touchdown pass to Mario Manningham from Eli Manning. With a 24–7 lead, the Colts continued to pound the Giants on defense, forcing a fumble which was returned for a touchdown. The fourth quarter continued with a touchdown pass to Reggie Wayne while the Giants eventually scored their second touchdown in the last minutes of the quarter. The Colts won the ballgame 38–14 ending their three-game regular season losing streak and improving their record on the season to 1–1.

==== Week 3: at Denver Broncos ====
Week 3: Indianapolis Colts at Denver Broncos – Game summary

Quarter	1	2	3	4	Total
**Colts**	6	7	7	7	**27**
Broncos	0	3	10	0	**13**

at INVESCO Field at Mile High; Denver, Colorado

- Date: September 26
- Game time: 4:15 PM EDT
- Game weather: 84 °F (29 °C) (Sunny)
- Game attendance: 76,401
- Referee: Alberto Riveron
- TV announcers (CBS): Jim Nantz and Phil Simms
- Recap

Game information

**First quarter**

- IND – (7:40) Adam Vinatieri 38-yard field goal. **Drive: 8 plays, 44 yards, 3:11.** (Colts 3–0)
- IND – (1:42) Adam Vinatieri 33-yard field goal. **Drive: 4 plays, −1 yards, 0:53.** (Colts 6–0)

**Second quarter**

- IND – (10:42) Austin Collie 5-yard reception from Peyton Manning, (Adam Vinatieri kick). **Drive: 7 plays, 26 yards, 3:00.** (Colts 13–0)
- DEN– (0:17) Matt Prater 25-yard field goal. **Drive: 11 plays, 54 yards, 1:37.** (Colts 13–3)

**Third quarter**

- DEN – (11:50) Brandon Lloyd 48-yard reception from Kyle Orton (Matt Prater kick). **Drive: 6 plays, 80 yards, 3:20.** (Colts 13–10)
- IND– (4:57) Blair White 9-yard reception from Peyton Manning (Adam Vinatieri kick). **Drive: 10 plays, 79 yards, 4:43.** (Colts 20–10)
- DEN – (2:30) Matt Prater 34-yard field goal. **Drive: 6 plays, 64 yards, 2:27.** (Colts 20–13)

**Fourth quarter**

- IND – (4:26) Austin Collie 23-yard reception from Peyton Manning (Adam Vinatieri kick). **Drive: 9 plays, 88 yards, 4:16.** (Colts 27–13)

**Top passers**

- IND – Peyton Manning – 27/43, 325 yards, 3 TD, 0 INT
- DEN – Kyle Orton – 37/57, 476 yards, 1 TD, 1 INT

**Top rushers**

- IND – Joseph Addai – 13 carries, 29 yards, 0 TD
- DEN – Laurence Maroney – 12 carries, 24 yards, 0 TD

**Top receivers**

- IND – Austin Collie – 12 receptions, 171 yards, 2 TD
- DEN – Brandon Lloyd – 6 receptions, 169, 1 TD

The Colts traveled to Denver, Colorado for an AFC conference matchup with the Denver Broncos. The game started with punts by both teams on their own opening drives. The Colts then drove down the field and scored on a 38-yard field goal by Adam Vinatieri. After a defensive interception set the Colts up down field, Indianapolis was forced to kick another field goal to extend their lead to 6–0 at the end of the first quarter. The Colts offense did not stop firing with the start of the second quarter, Peyton Manning threw to Austin Collie for his first touchdown of the game and gave the Colts a 13–0 lead. With the start of the second quarter the Bronco offense came alive. However, many offensive mistakes and key plays caused Denver to get points only on a late field goal by Matt Prater. At halftime, the Indianapolis Colts held the lead of 13–3. Denver received the ball first in the second half and was able to capitalize with a touchdown drive closing the game to a three-point margin. After switching possession, the Colts were able to respond with a touchdown drive that included Blair White, who was just signed from the practice squad prior to the game. Denver then scored a field goal late in the third quarter making the game a 20–13 contest heading into the fourth quarter. After defensive stops, the Colts were able to score a touchdown on another Austin Collie reception to take a commanding 27–13. The defense was able to stop the Broncos on their next possession allowing the Colts to win 27–13, and take their second straight game of the season, improving their record to 2–1.

==== Week 4: at Jacksonville Jaguars ====
Week 4: Indianapolis Colts at Jacksonville Jaguars – Game summary

Quarter	1	2	3	4	Total
Colts	7	7	0	14	**28**
**Jaguars**	7	7	7	10	**31**

at EverBank Field; Jacksonville, Florida

- Date: October 3
- Game time: 4:05 PM EDT
- Game weather: 80 °F (27 °C) (Partly Cloudy)
- Game attendance: 63,111
- Referee: Ron Winter
- TV announcers (CBS): Ian Eagle and Dan Fouts
- Game Recap

Game information

**First quarter**

- IND – (8:42) Joseph Addai 2-yard run (Adam Vinatieri kick), Colts 7–0. **Drive: 11 plays, 59 yards, 6:23.**
- JAC – (3:39) David Garrard 25-yard run (Josh Scobee kick), Tied 7–7. **Drive: 9 plays, 76 yards, 5:07.**

**Second quarter**

- JAC – (13:44) Maurice Jones-Drew 1-yard run (Josh Scobee kick), Jaguars 14–7. **Drive: 9 plays, 76 yards, 5:07.**
- IND – (7:45) Dallas Clark 7-yard pass from Peyton Manning (Adam Vinatieri kick), Tied 14–14. **Drive: 11 plays, 85 yards, 5:59.**

**Third quarter**

- JAC – (4:42) Marcedes Lewis 15-yard pass from David Garrard (Josh Scobee kick), Jaguars 21–14. **Drive: 7 plays, 49 yards, 3:49.**

**Fourth quarter**

- IND – (7:45) Joseph Addai 2-yard run (Adam Vinatieri kick), Tied 21–21. **Drive: 11 plays, 96 yards, 4:15.**
- JAC – (2:13) Maurice Jones-Drew 8-yard pass from David Garrard (Josh Scobee kick), Jaguars 28–21. **Drive: 9 plays, 57 yards, 5:26.**
- IND – (0:52) Austin Collie 1-yard pass from Peyton Manning (Adam Vinatieri kick), Tied 28–28. **Drive: 8 plays, 65 yards, 1:21.**
- JAC – (0:00) Josh Scobee 59-yard field goal, Jaguars 31–28. **Drive: 6 plays, 36 yards, 0:48**

**Top passers**

- JAC – David Garrard – 17/22, 163 yards, 2 TD
- IND – Peyton Manning – 33/46, 352 yards, 2 TD, 1 INT

**Top rushers**

- JAC – Maurice Jones-Drew – 26 rushes, 105 yards, 1 TD
- IND – Joseph Addai – 16 rushes, 63 yards, 2 TD

**Top receivers**

- JAC – Mike Thomas – 5 receptions, 68 yards
- IND – Reggie Wayne – 15 receptions, 196 yards

The Indianapolis Colts came into a crucial divisional matchup with the Jacksonville Jaguars, with added importance after the season opening loss to the Texans. With the first possession of the ballgame, the Colts drove down the field with a mix of pass and run plays, scoring the opening touchdown of the game. However, Jacksonville returned the favor by going 76 yards to tie the game up, and by the end of the first quarter the game was tied at 7–7. In the second quarter Maurice Jones-Drew scored on a touchdown run giving the Jaguars their first lead of the day, with the Colts eventually responded and tying the up 14–14 going into halftime. With the beginning of the second half both teams failed to score on their next possessions, with the Colts punting to the Jaguars midway through the third quarter. David Garrard threw his first touchdown pass of the day, giving the Jaguars a 21–14 lead towards the end of the third quarter. With the Colts trailing midway through the fourth quarter, Peyton Manning drove the team down the field to score on a Joseph Addai run. With the Jaguars responding and the Colts driving down the field to tie with 0:52 left, the game was a 28–28 with less than thirty seconds in the game. Jacksonville was able to get two big plays on their last drive of the game setting up Josh Scobee for a 59-yard field goal, which was good. The Indianapolis Colts started 0–2 in the AFC South for the first time following this loss, dropping out of first place and falling behind the Houston Texans.

==== Week 5: vs. Kansas City Chiefs ====
Week 5: Kansas City Chiefs at Indianapolis Colts – Game summary

Quarter	1	2	3	4	Total
Chiefs	0	3	6	0	**9**
**Colts**	3	3	3	10	**19**

at Lucas Oil Stadium; Indianapolis, Indiana

- Date: October 10
- Game time: 1:00 PM EDT
- Game weather: Roof closed, 83 °F (28 °C) (Outdoor Weather)
- Game attendance: 66,869
- Referee: Terry McAulay
- TV announcers (CBS): Spero Dedes and Dan Dierdorf
- Recap

Game information

**First quarter**

- IND – (10:08) Adam Vinatieri 20-yard field goal. **Drive: 9 plays, 35 yards, 4:56.** (Colts 3–0)

**Second quarter**

- IND – (9:19) Adam Vinatieri 24-yard field goal. **Drive: 16 plays, 86 yards, 7:50.** (Colts 6–0)
- KC – (9:19) Ryan Succop 45-yard field goal. **Drive: 3 plays, 34 yards, 0:16.** (Colts 6–3)

**Third quarter**

- IND – (8:36) Adam Vinatieri 47-yard field goal. **Drive: 10 plays, 51 yards, 4:10.** (Colts 9–3)
- KC – (4:40) Ryan Succop 35-yard field goal. **Drive: 8 plays, 55 yards, 3:56.** (Colts 9–6)
- KC– (3:26) Ryan Succop 43-yard field goal. **Drive: 4 plays, 5 yards, 0:18.** (9–9)

**Fourth quarter**

- IND – (14:40) Adam Vinatieri 42-yard field goal. **Drive: 12 plays, 60 yards, 3:46.** (Colts 12–9)
- IND – (4:02) Mike Hart 11-yard run (Adam Vinatieri kick) **Drive: 12 plays, 71 yards, 5:33.** (Colts 19–9)

**Top passers**

- KC – Matt Cassel – 16/29, 156 yards, 0 TD, 0 INT
- IND – Peyton Manning – 26/44, 244 yards, 0 TD, 1 INT

**Top rushers**

- KC – Jamaal Charles – 18 carries, 87 yards, 0 TD
- IND – Joseph Addai 17 carries, 50 yards, 0 TD

**Top receivers**

- KC – Tony Moeaki – 4 receptions, 50 yards, 0 TD
- IND – Reggie Wayne – 6 receptions, 75 yards, 0 TD

After losing the previous week to Jacksonville, the Indianapolis Colts came back home to Lucas Oil Stadium to battle with an undefeated Kansas City Chiefs team. The Chiefs' head coach, Todd Haley opened up the ballgame with an onside kick intended to give Kansas City the ball first. However, after it bounced less than 10 yards, the Colts received possession deep in Kansas City territory. Indianapolis was unable to capitalize on the good field position and forced Adam Vinatieri to kick a 20-yard field goal. Throughout the first quarter neither teams' offenses were able to get into a rhythm and by the end of the first quarter the Colts held a slim lead by the score of 3–0. With the start of the second quarter the offensive woes continued. The Colts were again unable to score a touchdown on good field position and were forced to kick their second field goal of the day. After a failed running play of fourth down by the Colts, the Chiefs were able to move down the field on good passes by Matt Cassel and a penalty on the Colts and were able to kick a field goal. Going into halftime, the score was 6–3 Colts. The third quarter continued to prove to be a defensive struggle. The Colts kicked another field goal midway through, however the Chiefs drove down the field to score another field goal. A Peyton Manning interception set up another field goal by the Chiefs which tied the game at 9–9. At the beginning of the fourth quarter the Colts continued their scoring ways of the day with a fourth field goal from Vinatieri. Finally with four minutes left in the ballgame, Mike Hart broke open an 11-yard run for the only touchdown of the day by both teams. The Colts won the game 19–9 and improved to 3–2 on the season. With the Chiefs loss they were not longer an undefeated team in the NFL.

==== Week 6: at Washington Redskins ====
Week 6: Indianapolis Colts at Washington Redskins – Game summary

Quarter	1	2	3	4	Total
**Colts**	7	10	7	3	**27**
Redskins	7	0	10	7	**24**

at FedExField; Landover, Maryland

- Date: October 17
- Game time: 8:20 PM EST
- Game weather: 70 °F (21 °C) (Sunny)
- Game attendance: 87,883
- Referee: John Parry
- TV announcers (NBC): Al Michaels, Cris Collinsworth and Andrea Kremer
- Recap

Game information

**First quarter**

- IND – (9:56) Pierre Garçon 57-yard reception from Peyton Manning (Adam Vinatieri kick) **Drive: 1 play, 57 yards, 0:09.** (Colts 7–0)
- WAS – (1:29) Ryan Torain 11-yard run (Graham Gano kick) **Drive: 10 plays, 89 yards, 5:22.** (7–7)

**Second quarter**

- IND – (12:44) Austin Collie 5-yard reception from Peyton Manning (Adam Vinatieri kick). **Drive: 12 plays, 84 yards, 3:38.** (Colts 14–7)
- IND – (2:05) Adam Vinatieri 43-yard field goal. **Drive: 9 plays, 53 yards, 3:06.** (Colts 17–7)

**Third quarter**

- WAS – (11:23) Ryan Torian 1-yard run (Graham Gano kick). **Drive: 4 plays, 13 yards, 1:31.** (Colts 17–14)
- IND – (9:27) Joseph Addai 13-yard run (Adam Vinatieri kick). **Drive: 4 plays, 66 yards, 1:57.** (Colts 24–14)
- WAS – (3:58) Graham Gano 39-yard field goal. **Drive: 5 plays, 18 yards, 2:13.** (Colts 24–17)

**Fourth quarter**

- IND – (8:45) Adam Vinatieri 33-yard field goal. **Drive: 8 plays, 49 yards, 4:07.** (Colts 27–17)
- WAS – (2:46) Keiland Williams 8-yard reception from Donovan McNabb (Graham Gano kick). **Drive: 12 plays, 92 yards, 5:55.** (Colts 27–24)

**Top passers**

- IND – Peyton Manning – 25/38, 307 yards, 2 TD, 0 INT
- WAS – Donovan McNabb – 29/45, 246 yards, 1 TD, 2 INT

**Top rushers**

- IND – Joseph Addai 17 carries, 128 yards, 1 TD
- WAS – Ryan Torain 20 carries, 100 yards, 2 TD

**Top receivers**

- IND – Pierre Garçon – 4 receptions, 103 yards, 1 TD
- WAS – Santana Moss – 8 receptions, 77 yards, 0 TD

Coming off their home win over the Chiefs, the Colts flew to FedExField for a Week 6 interconference duel with the Washington Redskins on Sunday night. Indianapolis delivered the game's opening punch as quarterback Peyton Manning found wide receiver Pierre Garçon on a 57-yard touchdown pass, but the Redskins answered with running back Ryan Torain getting a 9-yard touchdown run. In the second quarter, the Colts regained the lead as Manning hooked up with wide receiver Austin Collie on a 5-yard touchdown pass, followed by kicker Adam Vinatieri booting a 43-yard field goal.

Washington began the third quarter with Torain's 1-yard touchdown run, yet Indianapolis replied with running back Joseph Addai's 13-yard touchdown run. The Redskins would continue to remain close as kicker Graham Gano got a 39-yard field goal. In the fourth quarter, the Colts continued to add onto their lead as Vinatieri got a 33-yard field goal. Washington tried to rally as quarterback Donovan McNabb completed an 8-yard touchdown pass to running back Keiland Williams, yet Indianapolis' defense held tough to preserve the victory. With the win, the Colts improved to 4–2 and remained in a tie atop the AFC South division.

With about nine and a half minutes left in the second quarter, Peyton Manning suffered a painful hit from two Redskins defenders in which his back and neck bent violently backwards. Manning finished the season, but missed all of 2011 and suffered from neck issues for the rest of his career.

==== Week 8: vs. Houston Texans ====
Week 8: Houston Texans at Indianapolis Colts – Game summary

Quarter	1	2	3	4	Total
Texans	0	3	7	7	**17**
**Colts**	7	10	10	3	**30**

at Lucas Oil Stadium, Indianapolis, Indiana

- Date: November 1
- Game time: 7:30 p.m. CDT
- Game weather: None (retractable roof closed)
- Game attendance: 66,363
- Referee: Tony Corrente
- TV announcers (ESPN): Mike Tirico, Ron Jaworski, Jon Gruden, Suzy Kolber and Michele Tafoya
- Recap

Game information

**First quarter**

- IND – Jacob Tamme 2-yard pass from Peyton Manning (Adam Vinatieri kick), Colts 7–0, **Drive: 7 plays, 78 yards, 4:04.**

**Second quarter**

- IND – Kelvin Hayden 25-yard interception return (Adam Vinatieri kick), Colts 14–0.
- HOU – Neil Rackers 53-yard field goal, Colts 14–3, **Drive: 5 plays, 31 yards, 2:44.**
- IND – Adam Vinatieri 48-yard field goal, Colts 17–3, **Drive: 13 plays, 36 yards, 4:59.**

**Third quarter**

- IND – Reggie Wayne 15-yard pass from Peyton Manning (Adam Vinatieri kick), Colts 24–3, **Drive: 10 plays, 70 yards, 3:30.**
- HOU – Andre Johnson 28-yard pass from Matt Schaub (Neil Rackers kick), Colts 24–10, **Drive: 7 plays, 59 yards, 3:50.**
- IND – Adam Vinatieri 23-yard field goal, Colts 27–10, **Drive: 12 plays, 64 yards, 6:22.**

**Fourth quarter**

- HOU – Arian Foster 6-yard run (Neil Rackers kick), Colts 27–17, **Drive: 10 plays, 86 yards, 3:56.**
- IND – Adam Vinatieri 36-yard field goal, Colts 30–17, **Drive: 10 plays, 58 yards, 4:59.**

**Top passers**

- HOU – Matt Schaub – 22/38, 201 yards, 1 touchdown, 1 interception
- IND – Peyton Manning – 26/45, 268 yards, 2 touchdowns

**Top rushers**

- HOU – Arian Foster – 15 rushes, 102 yards, 1 touchdown
- IND – Mike Hart – 12 rushes, 84 yards

**Top receivers**

- HOU – Andre Johnson – 7 receptions, 106 yards, 1 touchdown
- IND – Pierre Garçon – 7 receptions, 78 yards

In a rematch of the opening game of the season, where the Houston Texans defeated the Indianapolis Colts 34–24, the Colts looked for revenge in their first Monday night game in Indianapolis since 2006. Both defenses came out strong in the beginning with both teams punting on their first drives. On the Colts second possession of the game, Indianapolis drove down the field for a Jacob Tamme touchdown, giving the Colts a 7–0 lead. Going into the second quarter, the Indianapolis offense and defense proved too much for the Texans. Kelvin Hayden took a 25-yard interception to the end zone and gave Indianapolis a 14–0 lead. On the following drive, Houston went down into Colts territory, however was only able to score a field goal ending the Indianapolis shutout. An Adam Vinatieri field goal gave the Colts a 17–3 lead going into halftime. Houston came out of the locker room improved, however Peyton Manning and the Indianapolis offense continued to be productive scoring a touchdown on a Reggie Wayne reception in the beginning of the first half. Following a Matt Schaub touchdown and another Vinatieri field goal, the Colts held a 27–10 lead going into the fourth quarter. With the Houston offense looking improved and the Indianapolis defense struggling, the Texans were able to score a touchdown on an Arian Foster run, while the Colts scored another field goal. With less than two minutes remaining in the game, a fumble by Schaub sealed the game with the final score being 30–17. With the win, Indianapolis moved to 5–2 on the season and held sole possession of first place for the first time in the 2010 season.

==== Week 9: at Philadelphia Eagles ====
Week 9: Indianapolis Colts at Philadelphia Eagles – Game summary

Quarter	1	2	3	4	Total
Colts	0	17	0	7	**24**
**Eagles**	10	6	3	7	**26**

at Lincoln Financial Field; Philadelphia, Pennsylvania

- Date: November 7
- Game time: 4:15 PM EST
- Game weather: 52 °F (11 °C) (Partly Cloudy)
- Game attendance: 69,144
- Referee: Carl Cheffers
- TV announcers (CBS): Jim Nantz and Phil Simms
- Recap

Game information

**First quarter**

- PHI – (13:18) DeSean Jackson 9-yard reception from Michael Vick (David Akers kick). **Drive: 3 plays, 72 yards, 1:46.** (Eagles 7–0)
- PHI – (11:26) David Akers 22-yard field goal. **Drive: 4 plays, 4 yards, 1:30.** (Eagles 10–0)
- PHI – (2:15) David Akers 21-yard field goal. **Drive: 9 plays, 96 yards, 3:30.** (Eagles 13–0)

**Second quarter**

- IND – (12:05) Jacob Tamme 3-yard reception from Peyton Manning (Adam Vinatieri kick). **Drive: 11 plays, 76 yards, 5:13.** (Eagles 13–7)
- PHI – (6:29) David Akers 31-yard field goal. **Drive: 10 plays, 55 yards, 5:33.** (Eagles 16–7)
- IND – (2:01) Javarris James 6-yard run (Adam Vinatieri kick) **Drive: 9 plays, 80 yards, 4:27.** (Eagles 16–14)
- IND – (0:07) Adam Vinatieri 37-yard field goal **Drive: 7 plays, 31 yards, 1:01.** (Colts 17–16)

**Third quarter**

- PHI – (7:33) David Akers 44-yard field goal **Drive: 8 plays, 27 yards, 3:32.** (Eagles 19–17)

**Fourth quarter**

- PHI – (13:47) Michael Vick 1-yard run from (David Akers kick) **Drive: 10 plays, 80 yards, 5:21.** (Eagles 26–17)
- IND – (1:50) Javarris James 1-yard run (Adam Vinatieri kick) **Drive: 16 plays, 85 yards, 4:07.** (Eagles 26–24)

**Top passers**

- IND – Peyton Manning – 31/51, 294 yards, 1 TD, 2 INT
- PHI – Michael Vick – 17/29, 218 yards, 1 TD, 0 INT

**Top rushers**

- IND – Donald Brown – 15 carries, 50 yards, 0 TD
- PHI – LeSean McCoy – 16 carries, 95 yards, 0 TD

**Top receivers**

- IND – Jacob Tamme – 11 receptions, 108 yards, 1 TD
- PHI – DeSean Jackson – 7 receptions, 109 yards, 1 TD

On the road at Lincoln Financial Field, the Indianapolis Colts played a NFC opponent in the Philadelphia Eagles for the first time since the 2006 season. The game did not start well for the Colts who allowed the Eagles to score a quick touchdown on only 3 plays covering 72 yards. A Peyton Manning interception caused more concern as the Colts now found themselves under the gun halfway through the first quarter. Two key defensive stops allowed the Eagles to only score two field goals making it a 13–0 Eagles lead heading into the second quarter. A touchdown pass from Manning to Jacob Tamme allowed the Colts to get back into the game trailing the Eagles only 13–7. A Philadelphia field goal from David Akers added to the lead, however the Colts continued chipping away. A hard hit on wide receiver Austin Collie, who was returning from injury that week, caused a 10‑minute delay in the game in which he was strapped to a stripper and taken to a nearby hospital, where he was diagnosed with a concussion. The Colts, playing with passion, drove down the field and scored a touchdown and field goal within the final two minutes of the half, giving them a 17–16 lead at halftime. The offensive production seen by the Colts in the second quarter was nowhere to be found in the third. The Colts began the third quarter with two three-and-outs while the Eagles got the lead back with a 44-yard field goal halfway through the quarter. Going into the fourth quarter, the Eagles were driving down into scoring position where a 1-yard run by Michael Vick gave the Eagles a 26–17 lead over the Colts. A continued lack of offensive production gave the Eagles the ball back and time to milk the clock. The Colts received the ball back with less than four minutes remaining in the game, trailing by two scores and drove down to score a touchdown. Jim Caldwell elected to kick the ball away to Philadelphia with 1:50 left, a first down and a defensive stop gave the Colts the ball back with less than 0:50 seconds in the game. After driving to midfield, Manning threw his second interception of the game and sealed the Indianapolis Colts third loss of the season.

==== Week 10: vs. Cincinnati Bengals ====
Week 10: Cincinnati Bengals at Indianapolis Colts – Game summary

Quarter	1	2	3	4	Total
Bengals	0	10	0	7	**17**
**Colts**	10	10	0	3	**23**

at Lucas Oil Stadium, Indianapolis, Indiana

- Date: November 14
- Game time: 1:00 p.m. EST
- Game weather: 46 °F (8 °C) (Sunny – retractable roof closed on turf)
- Game attendance: 67,404
- Referee: Walt Anderson
- TV announcers (CBS): Greg Gumbel and Dan Dierdorf
- Recap

Game information

**First quarter**

- IND – Adam Vinatieri 28-yard field goal, Colts 3–0, **Drive: 14 plays, 82 yards, 6:25.**
- IND – Kelvin Hayden 31-yard interception return (Adam Vinatieri kick), Colts 10–0.

**Second quarter**

- IND – Javarris James 3-yard run (Adam Vinatieri kick), Colts 17–0, **Drive: 7 plays, 25 yards, 2:55.**
- CIN – Mike Nugent 27-yard field goal, Colts 17–3, **Drive: 8 plays, 55 yards, 4:28.**
- CIN – Chad Ochocinco 5-yard pass from Carson Palmer (Mike Nugent kick), Colts 17–10, **Drive: 9 plays, 85 yards, 5:00.**
- IND – Adam Vinatieri 47-yard field goal, Colts 20–10, **Drive: 10 plays, 54 yards, 1:06.**

**Third quarter**

**Fourth quarter**

- IND – Adam Vinatieri 23-yard field goal, Colts 23–10, **Drive: 4 plays, 5 yards, 1:12.**
- CIN – Jermaine Gresham 19-yard pass from Carson Palmer (Mike Nugent kick), Colts 23–17, **Drive: 8 plays, 73 yards, 2:10.**

**Top passers**

- CIN – Carson Palmer – 31/42, 292 yards, 2 touchdowns, 3 interceptions
- IND – Peyton Manning – 20/36, 185 yards

**Top rushers**

- CIN – Brian Leonard – 1 rush, 42 yards
- IND – Donald Brown – 12 rushes, 50 yards

**Top receivers**

- CIN – Chad Ochocinco – 7 receptions, 86 yards, 1 touchdown
- IND – Jacob Tamme – 7 receptions, 73 yards

Following their third loss of the season, the Indianapolis Colts entered their home game against the Cincinnati Bengals with a chance to regain the lead in the AFC South. Indianapolis came out energized in the first quarter where the Colts picked up a field goal with three minutes remaining in the quarter, and a Kelvin Hayden interception returned for a touchdown. The second quarter continued to see Colts dominance with a Javarris James touchdown run, extending the Colts lead to 17–0. However, as the quarter wore on the defense began to allow larger gains and the Bengals were able to score a touchdown and a field goal in the last ten minutes of the half. However, an Adam Vinatieri field goal gave the Colts a 20–10 lead going into halftime. The Colts came out in the third quarter sluggish and both teams exchanged the ball throughout the rest of the quarter. Another Vinatieri field goal gave the Colts a 23–10 lead. With everything seeming secure, the Bengals were able to pick up a touchdown on a 19-yard pass from Carson Palmer making it a six-point game. The Bengals onside kick attempt was successful with a late penalty by the Colts, giving the Bengals the ball at the Colts 40-yard line. A fumble, the fifth turnover by the Bengals on the day, gave the Colts the ability to hold on to the lead and win the game 23–17, going to 6–3 on the season and taking first place in the AFC South by one game.

==== Week 11: at New England Patriots ====
Week 11: Indianapolis Colts at New England Patriots – Game summary

Quarter	1	2	3	4	Total
Colts	0	14	0	14	**28**
**Patriots**	7	14	7	3	**31**

at Gillette Stadium; Foxborough, Massachusetts

- Date: November 21
- Game time: 4:15 PM EST
- Game weather: 37 °F (3 °C) (Sunny and Cold)
- Game attendance: 68,756
- Referee: Gene Steratore
- TV announcers (CBS): Jim Nantz and Phil Simms
- Recap

Game information

**First quarter**

- NE – (8:00) Wes Welker 22-yard reception from Tom Brady (Shayne Graham kick). **Drive: 4 plays, 32 yards, 2:02.** (Patriots 7–0)

**Second quarter**

- NE – (13:15) Aaron Hernandez 8-yard reception from Tom Brady (Shayne Graham kick). **Drive: 15 plays, 82 yards, 7:46.** (Patriots 14–0)
- IND – (7:53) Gijon Robinson 1-yard reception from Peyton Manning (Adam Vinatieri kick) **Drive: 11 plays, 69 yards, 5:22.** (Patriots 14–7)
- NE – (3:34) BenJarvus Green-Ellis 5-yard run (Shayne Graham kick) **Drive: 8 plays, 65 yards, 4:19.** (Patriots 21–7)
- IND – (0:04) Reggie Wayne 11-yard reception from Peyton Manning (Adam Vinatieri kick). **Drive: 12 plays, 85 yards, 3:30.** (Patriots 21–14)

**Third quarter**

- NE – (1:11) Danny Woodhead 36-yard run. (Shayne Graham kick). **Drive: 9 plays, 79 yards, 4:42.** (Patriots 28–14)

**Fourth quarter**

- NE – (10:23) Shayne Graham 25-yard field goal. **Drive: 10 plays, 54 yards, 4:55.** (Patriots 31–14)
- IND – (7:57) Blair White 5-yard reception from Peyton Manning (Adam Vinatieri kick). **Drive: 7 plays, 73 yards, 2:26.** (Patriots 31–21)
- IND – (4:46) Blair White 18-yard reception from Peyton Manning (Adam Vinatieri kick) **Drive: 7 plays, 73 yards, 2:18.** (Patriots 31–28)

**Top passers**

- IND – Peyton Manning – 38/52, 396 yards, 4 TD, 3 INT
- NE – Tom Brady – 19/25, 186 yards, 2 TD, 0 INT

**Top rushers**

- IND – Donald Brown – 17 carries, 68 yards, 0 TD
- NE – BenJarvus Green-Ellis – 26 carries, 96 yards, 1 TD

**Top receivers**

- IND – Reggie Wayne – 8 receptions, 107 yards, 1 TD
- NE – Deion Branch – 7 carries, 70 yards, 0 TD

The Colts' tenth game was an AFC duel against the Patriots. In the first quarter the Colts trailed early as QB Tom Brady made a 22-yard TD pass to WR Wes Welker. This was followed in the second quarter by Brady throwing an 8-yard TD pass to TE Aaron Hernandez. The Colts narrowed the lead with QB Peyton Manning completing a 1-yard TD pass to TE Gijon Robinson, but the Patriots responded with a 5-yard TD run by RB BenJarvus Green-Ellis. The Colts tried to close the gap after Manning found WR Reggie Wayne on an 11-yard TD pass. The Colts struggled further in the 3rd quarter with RB Danny Woodhead getting a 36-yard TD run, followed in the fourth quarter by kicker Shayne Graham nailing a 25-yard field goal. The Colts tried to close the gap after Manning made a 5 and an 18-yard TD pass to WR Blair White, but his final pass was intercepted, giving the Colts a loss.

With the loss, the Colts fell to 6–4.

==== Week 12: vs. San Diego Chargers ====
Week 12: San Diego Chargers at Indianapolis Colts – Game summary

Quarter	1	2	3	4	Total
**Chargers**	10	6	10	10	**36**
Colts	7	7	0	0	**14**

at Lucas Oil Stadium; Indianapolis, Indiana

- Date: November 28
- Game time: 8:20 PM EST
- Game weather: Roof closed, retractable roof stadium
- Game attendance: 67,471
- Referee: Pete Morelli
- TV announcers (NBC): Al Michaels, Cris Collinsworth, & Andrea Kremer
- Recap

Game information

**First quarter**

- IND – Jacob Tamme 4-yard reception from Peyton Manning (Adam Vinatieri kick), Colts 7–0, **Drive: 12 plays, 78 yards, 5:44.**
- SD – Nate Kaeding 28-yard field goal, Colts 7–3, **Drive: 10 plays, 45 yards, 5:54.**
- SD – Kevin Burnett 29-yard interception return (Nate Kaeding kick), Chargers 10–7, **Drive: 3 plays, 5 yards, 1:22.**

**Second quarter**

- SD – Nate Kaeding 33-yard field goal, Chargers 13–7, **Drive: 9 plays, 45 yards, 4:46.**
- SD – Nate Kaeding 50-yard field goal, Chargers 16–7, **Drive: 5 plays, 26 yards, 2:27.**
- IND – Blair White 6-yard reception from Peyton Manning (Adam Vinatieri kick), Chargers 16–14, **Drive: 5 plays, 65 yards, 1:14.**

**Third quarter**

- SD – Nate Kaeding 30-yard field goal, Chargers 19–14, **Drive: 10 plays, 55 yards, 5:42.**
- SD – Eric Weddle 41-yard interception return (Nate Kaeding kick), Chargers 26–14

**Fourth quarter**

- SD – Mike Tolbert 3-yard ryn (Nate Kaeding kick), Chargers 33–14, **Drive: 10 plays, 61 yards, 6:01.**
- SD – Nate Kaeding 20-yard field goal, Chargers 36–14, **Drive: 8 plays, 31 yards, 5:12.**

**Top passers**

- SD – Philip Rivers – 19/23, 185 yards
- IND – Peyton Manning – 31/48, 285 yards, 2 TDs, 4 INTs

**Top rushers**

- SD – Mike Tolbert – 26 rushes, 103 yards, 1 TD
- IND – Donald Brown – 11 rushes, 24 yards

**Top receivers**

- SD – Antonio Gates – 4 receptions, 46 yards
- IND – Pierre Garçon – 5 receptions, 72 yards

The Colts' eleventh game was an AFC duel against the Chargers. They took the lead in the first quarter after QB Peyton Manning made a 4-yard TD pass to TE Jacob Tamme. They had a problem maintaining this lead after kicker Nate Kaeding made a 28-yard field goal, followed by ILB Kevin Burnett returning an interception 29 yards for a touchdown, and then with Kaeding hitting a 33 and a 50-yard field goal. They tried to cut the lead as Manning made a 6-yard TD pass to WR Blair White, but the Chargers controlled the second half with Kaeding getting a 30-yard field goal, which was shortly followed by FS Eric Weddle returning an interception 41 yards for a touchdown, then with FB Mike Tolbert getting a 3-yard TD run, and Kaeding making a 20-yard field goal, settling both records to 6–5. The Colts would have their 5- win season since 2002 at this point.

==== Week 13: vs. Dallas Cowboys ====
Week 13: Dallas Cowboys at Indianapolis Colts – Game summary

Quarter	1	2	3	4	OT	Total
**Cowboys**	10	7	10	8	3	**38**
Colts	0	7	7	21	0	**35**

at Lucas Oil Stadium; Indianapolis, Indiana

- Date: December 5
- Game time: 4:15 PM EST
- Game weather: 4:15 PM EST
- Game attendance: 67,471
- Referee: Pete Morelli
- TV announcers (Fox): Joe Buck, Troy Aikman, & Pam Oliver
- Recap

Game information

**First quarter**

- DAL – Tashard Choice 20-yard run (David Buehler kick), Cowboys 7–0, **Drive: 9 plays, 80 yards, 4:45.**
- DAL – David Buehler 30-yard field goal, Cowboys 10–0, **Drive: 12 plays, 72 yards, 6:40.**

**Second quarter**

- DAL – Orlando Scandrick 40-yard interception return (David Buehler kick), Cowboys 17–0.
- IND – Pierre Garçon 13-yard pass from Peyton Manning (Adam Vinatieri kick), Cowboys 17–7, **Drive: 15 plays, 86 yards, 8:15.**

**Third quarter**

- IND – Reggie Wayne 34-yard pass from Peyton Manning (Adam Vinatieri kick), Cowboys 17–14, **Drive: 4 plays, 80 yards, 1:07.**
- DAL – David Buehler 46-yard field goal, Cowboys 20–14, **Drive: 9 plays, 36 yards, 3:45.**
- DAL – Sean Lee 31-yard interception return (David Buehler kick), Cowboys 27–14.

**Fourth quarter**

- IND – Javarris James 1-yard run (Adam Vinatieri kick), Cowboys 27–21, **Drive: 10 plays, 80 yards, 4:57.**
- IND – Taj Smith 2-yard return of blocked punt, Colts 28–27.
- DAL – Jason Witten 2-yard pass from Jon Kitna (Jon Kitna – Roy E. Williams pass), Cowboys 35–28, **Drive: 18 plays, 81 yards, 10:18.**
- IND – Javarris James 2-yard run (Adam Vinatieri kick), Tied 35–35, **Drive: 10 plays, 81 yards, 2:09.**

**Overtime**

- DAL – David Buehler 38-yard field goal, Cowboys 38–35,**Drive: 6 plays, 16 yards, 3:16.**

**Top passers**

- DAL – Jon Kitna – 18/26, 167 yards, 1 touchdown
- IND – Peyton Manning – 36/48, 365 yards, 2 touchdowns, 4 interceptions

**Top rushers**

- DAL – Tashard Choice – 19 rushes, 100 yards, 1 touchdown
- IND – Javarris James – 6 rushes, 18 yards, 2 touchdowns

**Top receivers**

- DAL – Miles Austin – 4 receptions, 47 yards
- IND – Reggie Wayne – 14 receptions, 200 yards, 1 touchdown

Hoping to break a two-game losing streak the Colts played on home ground for an Interconference duel with the Cowboys. In the first quarter the Colts caused problems with their defense after RB Tashard Choice got a 20-yard TD run, followed by kicker David Buehler hitting a 40-yard field goal. The offense had problems too as QB Peyton Manning's pass was intercepted by SS Orlando Scandrick and returned 40 yards for a touchdown. They responded with Manning getting a 13 and a 34-yard TD pass to WR Pierre Garçon and WR Reggie Wayne. The Cowboys increased their lead after Buehler made a 46-yard field goal, and with LB Sean Lee returning an interception 31 yards for a TD. The Colts got a slight lead with RB Javarris James getting a 1-yard TD run, followed by WR Taj Smith returning a blocked punt 2 yards for a touchdown. They trailed again with QB Jon Kitna completing a 2-yard TD pass to TE Jason Witten (With a successful 2-point conversion as Kitna passed to WR Roy E. Williams). They managed to tie the game after James made a 2-yard TD run. The decision was made in overtime when Buehler successfully made a 38-yard field goal to give the Colts a three-game losing streak, for the first time since 2002.

With the loss, the Colts fell to 6–6.

==== Week 14: at Tennessee Titans ====
Week 14: Indianapolis Colts at Tennessee Titans – Game summary

Quarter	1	2	3	4	Total
**Colts**	7	14	3	6	**30**
Titans	0	7	7	14	**28**

at LP Field, Nashville, Tennessee

- Date: December 9
- Game time: 7:20 p.m. CST
- Game weather: 35 °F (2 °C) (Clear and Cold)
- Game attendance: 69,143
- Referee: John Parry
- TV announcers (NFLN): Bob Papa, Matt Millen, and Joe Theismann
- Recap

Game information

**First quarter**

- IND – (2:08) Javarris James 1-yard run (Adam Vinatieri kick), Colts 7–0, **Drive: 11 plays, 68 yards, 5:58.**

**Second quarter**

- IND – (10:22) Pierre Garçon 1-yard pass from Peyton Manning (Adam Vinatieri kick), Colts 14–0, **Drive: 10 plays, 59 yards, 4:33.**
- IND – (2:30) Pierre Garçon 19-yard pass from Peyton Manning (Adam Vinatieri kick), Colts 21–0, **Drive: 2 plays, 19 yards, 0:08.**
- TEN – (0:54) Chris Johnson 1-yard run (Rob Bironas kick), Colts 21–7, **Drive: 7 plays, 55 yards, 1:36.**

**Third quarter**

- TEN – (11:14) Craig Stevens 7-yard pass from Kerry Collins (Rob Bironas kick), Colts 21–14, **Drive: 7 plays, 62 yards, 3:51.**
- IND – (7:27) Adam Vinatieri 21-yard field goal, Colts 24–14, **Drive: 8 plays, 77 yards, 3:47.**

**Fourth quarter**

- IND – (12:59) Adam Vinatieri 28-yard field goal, Colts 27–14, **Drive: 16 plays, 64 yards, 7:52.**
- TEN – (8:06) Bo Scaife 4-yard pass from Kerry Collins (Rob Bironas kick), Colts 27–21, **Drive: 8 plays, 66 yards, 4:56.**
- IND – (3:00) Adam Vinatieri 47-yard field goal, Colts 30–21, **Drive: 6 plays, 46 yards, 1:12.**
- TEN – (0:00) Bo Scaife 2-yard pass from Kerry Collins (Rob Bironas kick), Colts 30–28,**Drive: 14 plays, 77 yards, 2:55.**

**Top passers**

- IND – Peyton Manning – 25/35, 319 yards, 2 touchdowns
- TEN – Kerry Collins – 28/39, 244 yards, 3 touchdowns

**Top rushers**

- IND – Javarris James – 17 rushes, 49 yards, 1 touchdown
- TEN – Chris Johnson – 22 rushes, 111 yards, 1 touchdown

**Top receivers**

- IND – Reggie Wayne – 4 receptions, 106 yards
- TEN – Chris Johnson – 8 receptions, 68 yards

Trying to snap a three-game losing streak, the Colts flew to LP Field for a Week 14 AFC South duel with the Tennessee Titans on Thursday night. Indianapolis delivered the game's opening strike in the first quarter with a 1-yard touchdown run from rookie running back Javarris James. The Colts would add onto their lead in the second quarter as quarterback Peyton Manning found wide receiver Pierre Garçon on a 1-yard and a 19-yard touchdown pass. The Titans responded with running back Chris Johnson getting a 1-yard touchdown run.

Tennessee began to cut away at their deficit in the third quarter as quarterback Kerry Collins completed a 7-yard touchdown pass to tight end Craig Stevens, yet Indianapolis responded with a 21-yard field goal from kicker Adam Vinatieri. The Colts added onto their lead in the fourth quarter with a 28-yard field goal from Vinatieri. The Titans tried to rally as Collins completed a 9-yard touchdown pass to tight end Bo Scaife, yet Indianapolis rose to the challenge with Vinatieri booting a 47-yard field goal. Tennessee closed out the game with Collins completing a 2-yard touchdown pass to Scaife.

With the win, the Colts improved to 7–6.

==== Week 15: vs. Jacksonville Jaguars ====
Week 15: Jacksonville Jaguars at Indianapolis Colts – Game summary

Quarter	1	2	3	4	Total
Jaguars	0	10	7	7	**24**
**Colts**	7	7	10	10	**34**

at Lucas Oil Stadium, Indianapolis, Indiana

- Date: December 19
- Game time: 1:00 p.m. EST
- Game weather: None (retractable roof closed)
- Game attendance: 67,147
- Referee: Mike Carey
- TV announcers (CBS): Greg Gumbel & Dan Dierdorf
- Recap

Game information

**First quarter**

- IND – Austin Collie 7-yard pass from Peyton Manning (Adam Vinatieri kick), Colts 7–0, **Drive: 8 plays, 82 yards, 3:39.**

**Second quarter**

- JAC – Josh Scobee 22-yard field goal, Colts 7–3, **Drive: 15 plays, 77 yards, 8:41.**
- IND – Austin Collie 27-yard pass from Peyton Manning (Adam Vinatieri kick), Colts 14–3, **Drive: 11 plays, 92 yards, 4:22.**
- JAC – Mike Thomas 78-yard punt return (Josh Scobee kick), Colts 14–10.

**Third quarter**

- IND – Donald Brown 43-yard run (Adam Vinatieri kick), Colts 21–10, **Drive: 2 plays, 38 yards, 1:03.**
- IND – Adam Vinatieri 34-yard field goal, Colts 24–10, **Drive: 4 plays, 5 yards, 1:21.**
- JAC – Mike Sims-Walker 6-yard pass from David Garrard (Josh Scobee kick), Colts 24–17, **Drive: 7 plays, 77 yards, 4:53.**

**Fourth quarter**

- IND – Adam Vinatieri 37-yard field goal, Colts 27–17, **Drive: 9 plays, 37 yards, 5:03.**
- JAC – Mike Sims-Walker 1-yard pass from David Garrard (Josh Scobee kick), Colts 27–24, **Drive: 7 plays, 51 yards, 1:27.**
- IND – Tyjuan Hagler 41-yard kickoff return (Adam Vinatieri kick), Colts 34–24, **Drive: 0 plays, 0 yards, 0:07.**

**Top passers**

- JAC – David Garrard – 24/38, 294 yards, 2 touchdowns, 1 interception
- IND – Peyton Manning – 29/39, 229 yards, 2 touchdowns

**Top rushers**

- JAC – Maurice Jones-Drew – 15 rushes, 46 yards
- IND – Donald Brown – 14 rushes, 129 yards, 1 touchdown

**Top receivers**

- JAC – Rashad Jennings – 7 receptions, 64 yards
- IND – Austin Collie – 8 receptions, 87 yards, 2 touchdowns

Coming off their win over the Titans the Colts played on home ground for an AFC South rivalry rematch against the Jaguars. In the first quarter the Colts took the lead as QB Peyton Manning threw a 7-yard TD pass to Austin Collie. The lead was narrowed with a 22-yard field goal from kicker Josh Scobee, but the Colts scored again as Manning found Collie again on a 27-yard TD pass. They conceded their first touchdown of the game when Mike Thomas returned a punt 78 yards to the endzone. After that, the Colts extended their lead with RB Donald Brown getting a 43-yard TD run, followed by kicker Adam Vinatieri nailing a 34-yard field goal. The lead was cut down with QB David Garrard completing a 6-yard TD pass to WR Mike Sims-Walker, but the Colts increased their lead with Vinatieri making a 37-yard field goal. The Jaguars tried to come back with Garrard finding Sims-Walker on a 1-yard TD pass. After that, the Colts soon pulled away with Tyjuan Hagler returning a failed onside kick 41 yards for a touchdown.

With the win, the Colts improved to 8–6.

==== Week 16: at Oakland Raiders ====
Week 16: Indianapolis Colts at Oakland Raiders – Game summary

Quarter	1	2	3	4	Total
**Colts**	7	10	7	7	**31**
Raiders	7	6	3	10	**26**

at Oakland–Alameda County Coliseum; Oakland, California

- Date: December 26
- Game time: 4:05 PM EST
- Game weather: 58 °F (14 °C) (Sunny)
- Game attendance: 52,567
- Referee: Terry McAulay
- TV announcers (CBS): Greg Gumbel and Dan Dierdorf
- Recap

Game information

**First quarter**

- OAK – Jacoby Ford 99-yard kickoff return (Sebastian Janikowski kick), Raiders 7–0, **Drive: 1 play, 99 yards, 0:00.**
- IND – Joseph Addai 6-yard run (Adam Vinatieri kick), Tied 7–7, **Drive: 6 plays, 57 yards, 2:16.**

**Second quarter**

- IND – Adam Vinatieri 30-yard field goal, Colts 10–7, **Drive: 11 plays, 50 yards, 5:02.**
- OAK – Sebastian Janikowski 59-yard field goal, Tied 10–10, **Drive: 9 plays, 34 yards, 5:20.**
- OAK – Sebastian Janikowski 38-yard field goal, Raiders 13–10, **Drive: 11 plays, 62 yards, 5:33.**
- IND – Jacob Tamme 18-yard pass from Peyton Manning (Adam Vinatieri kick), Colts 17–13, **Drive: 8 plays, 88 yards, 1:19.**

**Third quarter**

- OAK – Sebastian Janikowski 51-yard field goal, Colts 17–16, **Drive: 6 plays, 23 yards, 2:50.**
- IND – Blair White 4-yard pass from Peyton Manning (Adam Vinatieri kick), Colts 24–16, **Drive: 4 plays, 56 yards, 1:52.**

**Fourth quarter**

- OAK – Sebastian Janikowski 45-yard field goal, Colts 24–19, **Drive: 5 plays, 10 yards, 1:46.**
- IND – Pierre Garçon 7-yard pass from Peyton Manning (Adam Vinatieri kick), Colts 31–19, **Drive: 9 plays, 68 yards, 5:21.**
- OAK – Zach Miller 6-yard pass from Jason Campbell (Sebastian Janikowski kick), Colts 31–26, **Drive: 12 plays, 80 yards, 3:11.**

**Top passers**

- IND – Peyton Manning – 16/30, 179 yards, 3 touchdowns, 2 interceptions
- OAK – Jason Campbell – 29/42, 231 yards, 1 touchdown

**Top rushers**

- IND – Dominic Rhodes – 17 rushes, 98 yards
- OAK – Darren McFadden – 11 rushes, 45 yads

**Top receivers**

- IND – Jacob Tamme – 7 receptions, 78 yards, 1 touchdown
- OAK – Zach Miller – 9 receptions, 66 yards, 1 touchdown

Coming off their win over the Jaguars the Colts flew to Oakland–Alameda County Coliseum for an AFC duel with the Raiders. In the first quarter the Colts trailed immediately after a 99-yard kickoff return was made by Jacoby Ford. They soon took the lead with RB Joseph Addai getting a 6-yard TD run, followed by kicker Adam Vinatieri getting a 30-yard field goal. They trailed again after kicker Sebastian Janikowski hit a 59 and a 38-yard field goal, but responded to take the lead back with QB Peyton Manning completing an 18-yard TD pass to TE Jacob Tamme. The lead was narrowed with Janikowski nailing a 51-yard field goal, but the Colts extended their lead with Manning getting a 4-yard TD pass to WR Blair White. The Raiders tried to keep up with Janikowski making a 45-yard field goal, but the Colts kept going with Manning completing a 7-yard TD pass to WR Pierre Garçon. The Raiders tried to come back after QB Jason Campbell threw a 6-yard TD pass to TE Zach Miller, but Manning ran for a first down on the Colts ensuing possession to seal the game.

With the win, Indianapolis improved to 9–6. This would also be Indianapolis last road win until week 8 in 2012 against Tennessee.

==== Week 17: vs. Tennessee Titans ====
Week 17: Tennessee Titans at Indianapolis Colts – Game summary

Quarter	1	2	3	4	Total
Titans	3	3	14	0	**20**
**Colts**	3	10	7	3	**23**

at Lucas Oil Stadium; Indianapolis, Indiana

- Date: January 2
- Game time: 4:15 PM EDT
- Referee: Ed Hochuli
- TV announcers (CBS): Jim Nantz & Phil Simms

Hoping to clinch a playoff spot the Colts played on home ground for a division rivalry rematch against the Titans. In the first quarter the Colts took the lead as kicker Adam Vinatieri made a 48-yard field goal, with the Titans replying as kicker Rob Bironas nailed a 26-yard field goal. The Colts scored again with Vinatieri making a 44-yard field goal, but the Titans re-tied the game with Bironas hitting a 42-yard field goal. The Colts tried to pull away with QB Peyton Manning completing a 7-yard TD pass to WR Reggie Wayne, but the Titans kept the score level as QB Kerry Collins made a 30-yard TD pass to WR Kenny Britt. The Colts still tried to pull away with Manning completing a 30-yard TD pass to WR Pierre Garçon, but the Titans re-tied the game for the fourth time as Collins threw a 15-yard TD pass to RB Chris Johnson. The Colts got away in the fourth quarter as Vinatieri got a 43-yard field goal.

With the win, the Colts finish on a 10–6 record and successfully clinched a play-off spot. As the New Orleans Saints also clinched a playoff spot, the 2010 season marked the first time in 10 years that both defending conference champions made the playoffs in the same season. This was also the final regular season game with Peyton Manning as the Colts' starting quarterback.

== Postseason ==
=== Schedule ===
Round	Date	Opponent (seed)	Result	Record	Venue	Recap
Wild Card	January 8	New York Jets (6)	L 16–17	0–1	Lucas Oil Stadium	Recap

=== Game summaries ===
==== AFC Wild Card Playoffs: vs. (6) New York Jets ====
AFC Wild Card Playoffs: (6) New York Jets at (3) Indianapolis Colts – Game summary

- Game time: 8:00 PM EST
- Game weather: Played with roof closed, retractable roof stadium
- TV announcers (NBC): Al Michaels, Cris Collinsworth, & Andrea Kremer
- Game attendance: at Lucas Oil Stadium, Indianapolis, Indiana
- Referee: Gene Steratore
- Attendance: 65,332

First quarter

- No scoring plays

Second quarter

- IND – Pierre Garçon 57-yard pass from Peyton Manning (Adam Vinatieri kick), Colts 7–0, Drive: 5 plays, 80 yards, in 2:44.

Third quarter

- NYJ – LaDainian Tomlinson 1-yard run (Nick Folk kick), Tied 7–7, Drive: 10 plays, 63 yards, 5:12.
- IND – Adam Vinatieri 47-yard field goal, Colts 10–7, Drive: 9 plays, 45 yards, 4:45.

Fourth quarter

- NYJ – LaDainian Tomlinson 1-yard run (Nick Folk kick), Jets 14–10, Drive: 17 plays, 87 yards, 9:54.
- IND – Adam Vinatieri 32-yard field goal, Jets 14–13, Drive: 13 plays, 67 yards, 5:22.
- IND – Adam Vinatieri 50-yard field goal, Colts 16–14, Drive: 8 plays, 48 yards, 1:43.
- NYJ – Nick Folk 32-yard field goal, Jets 17–16, Drive: 5 plays, 40 yards, 0:53.

	1	2	3	4	Total
Jets	0	0	7	10	17
Colts	0	7	3	6	16

Top passers

- NYJ – Mark Sanchez – 18/31, 189 yards, 0 touchdowns, 1 interception
- IND – Peyton Manning – 18/26, 225 yards, 1 touchdown

Top rushers

- NYJ – LaDainian Tomlinson – 16 rushes, 82 yards, 2 touchdowns
- IND – Joseph Addai – 13 rushes, 60 yards

Top receivers

- NYJ – Braylon Edwards – 4 receptions, 62 yards
- IND – Pierre Garçon – 5 receptions, 112 yards, 1 touchdown

Entering the playoffs as the AFC #3 seed, the Colts began their playoff run at home in the AFC Wild Card round against the #6 New York Jets in a rematch of the 2009–10 AFC Championship Game. After a scoreless first quarter, the Colts delivered the game's opening strike in the second quarter as quarterback Peyton Manning found wide receiver Pierre Garçon on a 57-yard touchdown pass.

The Jets answered in the third quarter with running back LaDainian Tomlinson getting a one-yard touchdown run, yet Indianapolis regained the lead with a 47-yard field goal from kicker Adam Vinatieri. New York took the lead in the fourth quarter with Tomlinson getting another one-yard touchdown run. The Colts regained the lead with a 32-yard and a 50-yard field goal from Vinatieri, but the Jets' Nick Folk kicked the game-winning 32-yard field goal.

With the loss, Indianapolis' season came to an end with an overall record of 10–7.

It would be Peyton Manning's final game as a Colt. He missed the entire 2011 season due to multiple neck surgeries, and signed with the Denver Broncos in 2012.
