= Bishop McNamara High School (Kankakee, Illinois) =

Bishop McNamara Catholic High School

Location
- 550 West Brookmont; Kankakee, Illinois 60901; United States; 41.1347°N 87.8681°W

Information
- Type: Private, parochial, Coeducational
- Denomination: Roman Catholic
- Patron saint: Bishop Mcnamara
- Established: 1922
- Oversight: Diocese of Joliet
- Principal: Kaelyn Bess
- Grades: 9–12
- Colors: Green and White
- Slogan: Choose To Be More
- Athletics conference: Chicagoland Christian Conference
- Nickname: Fightin' Irish
- Newspaper: The Blarney Stone
- Yearbook: The Shamrock
- Tuition: US$7240
- Affiliation: Catholic
- Website: www.bishopmac.com

Bishop McNamara High School (often referred to as Bishop Mac, McNamara, or Mac) is a private, Roman Catholic high school in Kankakee, Illinois. It is located in the Roman Catholic Diocese of Joliet in Illinois.

== History ==
In 1921, the cornerstone was laid for St. Patrick High School, nearly 30 years after the founding of St. Patrick parish in Kankakee. In the fall of 1922, Father Henry M. Shea opened the parish high school. Under the direction of the Sisters of Loretto at the Foot of the Cross, classes were conducted in the grade school building until the final phase of the high school building was completed. St. Patrick High, the only Catholic co-educational high school in this area, was formally dedicated on November 12, 1923.

The first graduates in 1925 were all commercial students. By 1926, there were 112 students enrolled in both business and academic courses. In 1931, the Clerics of St. Viator assumed charge of St. Patrick Parish, and for 25 years the Viatorians and Sisters of Loretto educated students at the school on Hickory Street in Kankakee.

By the early 1950s, the school was bulging with more than 300 students and it was apparent that a new site was needed. Dorothy and Romy Hammes provided the funds to purchase property for the new school. No longer a parish school, the name was changed to St. Patrick Central, and served students from 16 parishes in the Kankakee area.

In little more than 10 years, enrollment had once again outgrown the facility. The closing of St. Joseph Seminary would add to the student body, and in 1963, through the generosity of Mr. and Mrs. Romy Hammes, construction began on the rectangle addition to the circular building. In the 1964-65 school year, the new addition was opened, and the name changed to Bishop McNamara High School in honor of the first bishop of the Joliet diocese, who had been instrumental in the central school's development.

The Clerics of St. Viator administered the school until 1981, when, because of a growing shortage of priests, they had to discontinue their commitment. Viatorian priest Father Erwin Savela was hired as principal of Bishop McNamara High School and continued in that position until 1988. David Raiche was principal for one year, and then in 1990, the Order of St. Augustine assumed administration of the school. After 10 years, once again because of the decreasing number of priests available, the Augustinians ended their contract with Bishop McNamara High School and James Laurenti was named principal.

In 2008, Kurt Weigt became principal and the word Catholic was added to the school's title to further promote religious beliefs. In 2012, former staff member and alum Terry Granger was hired as principal. Bishop McNamara Catholic continues as the only Catholic high school in three counties. Priests from area parishes served by the school celebrate Mass regularly and assist with liturgies.

In 2016, the Catholic schools of the area reorganized under the name Bishop McNamara Catholic School. At that time, grades 9-12 were moved to almost exclusively occupy the rectangle portion of the Kankakee location, while the 7th and 8th grade students from area schools were moved to the circle (original) part of the building. Two other sites in Bourbonnais (the former Maternity BVM) and Bradley (the former St. Joseph) housed grades PreK-6. Later, the 6th grade students were also moved to the Kankakee site, with both the Bourbonnais and Bradley sites beginning to offer PreK3.

== Academics ==
Graduation requirements consist of the accumulation of twenty-three academic credits and sixty hours of approved community service. Credits must be accumulated in the subjects of Religion, English language and literature, Mathematics, Physical and Chemical Sciences, Social and Historical studies, Modern Language/Fine Arts/Vocational studies, and Elective classes. With the number of credits required per subject ranging from two (Sciences, Social and Historical studies, and Modern Language/Fine Arts/Vocational studies) to six (Elective classes).

The school currently offers Advanced Placement courses in English Literature, Chemistry, Spanish Language, United States History, Macroeconomics, Psychology, Calculus, and Physics.

In addition to its college preparatory curriculum, the school maintains a relationship with the Kankakee Area Career Center which offers students an opportunity to earn credit in industrial technology, with courses ranging from cosmetology, drafting, firefighting, EMS training, welding, and law enforcement training.

== Athletics ==
The Bishop McNamara Fightin' Irish compete in two conferences. The men compete in the Metro Suburban Conference (MSC). The women compete in the East Suburban Catholic Conference (ESCC). They also compete in the state tournaments sponsored by the Illinois High School Association. The school currently sponsors teams for men and women in basketball, cross country, golf, soccer, tennis, and track & field. Men can compete in baseball, football, and wrestling. Women can compete in softball, cheerleading, and volleyball. While not supported by the ESCC, nor by the IHSA, the school also sponsors a Pom-pon dance team

The following teams have finished in the top four of their respective IHSA state tournaments:

- baseball •• 3rd place (1993—94); 2nd place (1988—89)
- basketball (girls) •• 4th place (2007—08) (2009—10) State Champions (2014–15)
- cross country (girls) •• 2nd place (1995—96)
- football •• 2nd place (1978—79, 1981—82, 1998—99); State Champions (1982—83, 1985—86, 1986—87, 1987—88, 2015—16)
- golf (boys) •• 4th place (1998—99); 3rd place (1995—96); 2nd place (1977—78, 1988—89, 1989—90, 1990—91, 1991—92); State Champions (1992—93, 2000—01)
- softball •• 3rd place (2014–15); State Champions (2012-13)
- track & field (girls) •• 2nd place (1978—79)
- The Pom Dance Team have won first in the state championship five times since 2001 in the Team Dance Illinois State tournament. They have consistently placed among the top three in their state championship tournament every year they have competed since 2001. TDI is recognized by the Illinois High School Association (IHSA) and conducts its competitive and educational programs according to the IHSA and NFHS Spirit Rules
- They also have 7th and 8th grade Basket Ball, Girls Basket Ball, Baseball, Softball, Volleyball, Cross Country, and Track.

== Notable alumni ==
- Thomas V. Draude - decorated U.S. Marine officer
- Thomas L. Kilbride - former Chief Justice, Supreme Court of the State of Illinois
- Alex Storako - softball player
- Tyjuan Hagler, Class of 2000 - NFL linebacker, Indianapolis Colts (Super Bowl XLI Champions)
- Thomas Guynes, Class of 1993 - NFL offensive lineman, Arizona Cardinals
- Kurt Belisle, Jr., Class of 1994
- Lee Lafayette, Class of 1996
- Jackie Haas - politician
- Jonathan Ward, Class of 2016
- Dylan Deatheridge, Class of 2017
- Chris Autman-Bell, Class of 2017
- Johnny Short, Class of 1999
