= Thomas Guynes =

American football player (born 1974)

No. 71
- Position: Offensive tackle / Guard

Personal information
- Born: September 9, 1974 (age 52); Marion, Indiana, U.S.
- Listed height: 6 ft 5 in (1.96 m)
- Listed weight: 300 lb (136 kg)

Career information
- High school: Kankakee (IL) Bishop McNamara
- College: Michigan
- NFL draft: 1997: undrafted

Career history
- Arizona Cardinals (1997–1998); Berlin Thunder (2000–2001)
- Stats at Pro Football Reference

Thomas V. Guynes (born September 9, 1974) is an American former professional football player who was an offensive lineman for the Arizona Cardinals of the National Football League (NFL). He played college football as an offensive guard and tackle for the Michigan Wolverines from 1994 to 1996. He played for the [Cardinals during the 1997 season.

== Early life ==
Guynes was born in Marion, Indiana, and attended Bishop McNamara High School in Kankakee, Illinois.

== University of Michigan ==
Guynes played college football as an offensive lineman for the University of Michigan from 1994 to 1996. As a sophomore in 1994, he started 7 games at right tackle, 3 games at right guard and 1 game at left guard. He started all 12 games at left tackle for the 1996 Michigan Wolverines football team.

== Professional football ==
Guynes played professional football for the Arizona Cardinals in the 1997 NFL season. He appeared in four games for the Cardinals. He also played in the NFL Europe for the Berlin Thunder in 2000 and 2001.

== Later life ==
After retiring from football, Guynes worked in law enforcement as a deputy with the Washtenaw County Sheriff Department.
