= Tyjuan Hagler =

American football player (born 1981)

No. 56
- Position: Linebacker

Personal information
- Born: December 3, 1981 (age 44); Kankakee, Illinois, U.S.
- Listed height: 6 ft 0 in (1.83 m)
- Listed weight: 236 lb (107 kg)

Career information
- High school: Bishop McNamara (Kankakee)
- College: Cincinnati
- NFL draft: 2005: 5th round, 173rd overall pick

Career history
- Indianapolis Colts (2005–2009); Seattle Seahawks (2010)*; Indianapolis Colts (2010)
- * Offseason or practice squad member only

Awards and highlights
- Super Bowl champion (XLI); Third-team All-Conference USA (2004)

Career NFL statistics
- Total tackles: 174
- Sacks: 2
- Forced fumbles: 1
- Fumble recoveries: 2
- Interceptions: 1
- Stats at Pro Football Reference

Tyjuan Cedric Hagler (born December 3, 1981) is an American former professional football player who was a linebacker for the Indianapolis Colts of the National Football League (NFL). He was selected by the Colts in the fifth round of the 2005 NFL draft and later won Super Bowl XLI with the team. He played college football for the Cincinnati Bearcats. Hagler was also a member of the Seattle Seahawks.

== Early life ==
Hagler attended Bishop McNamara High School in Kankakee. As a junior, he won first-team All-State honors, helped lead his team to a 13–1 record, and helped lead his team to second place in the state playoffs. As a senior, he had 3 sacks and 61 tackles on defense, and rushed for over 1,400 yards and 25 touchdowns on offense.

== Professional career ==
=== Indianapolis Colts (first stint) ===
On November 4, 2009, it was reported that Hagler had suffered a ruptured biceps and would be on injured reserve for the rest of the season. Hagler contributed to the Colts' Super Bowl XLI victory over the Chicago Bears by recovering a fumble on a kickoff, fumbled by Gabe Reid.

=== Seattle Seahawks ===
Hagler signed with the Seattle Seahawks on August 10, 2010. He was waived at the end of training camp.

=== Indianapolis Colts (second stint) ===
Hagler re-signed with the Colts on September 29, 2010. He was waived on October 7, but re-signed with the Colts on October 10. During a key week 15 game against the Jacksonville Jaguars, Hagler returned an onside kick from Josh Scobee 41 yards for a touchdown. The Colts ended up winning the game, 34–24, controlling their own destiny from that point on by winning the AFC South crown.

== NFL career statistics ==
Legend
**Bold**	Career high

=== Regular season ===
Year	Team	Games		Tackles					Interceptions					Fumbles			
Year	Team	GP	GS	Cmb	Solo	Ast	Sck	TFL	Int	Yds	TD	Lng	PD	FF	FR	Yds	TD
2006	IND	9	0	7	3	4	0.0	0	0	0	0	0	0	0	0	0	0
2007	IND	12	**7**	54	41	**13**	**1.0**	**3**	0	0	0	0	1	0	**1**	0	0
2008	IND	9	3	27	19	8	0.0	1	0	0	0	0	0	**1**	0	0	0
2009	IND	7	**7**	27	15	12	0.0	1	0	0	0	0	**3**	0	0	0	0
2010	IND	**13**	2	**59**	**48**	11	**1.0**	1	**1**	**35**	0	**35**	**3**	0	**1**	0	0
		50	19	174	126	48	2.0	6	1	35	0	35	7	1	2	0	0

=== Playoffs ===
Year	Team	Games		Tackles					Interceptions					Fumbles			
Year	Team	GP	GS	Cmb	Solo	Ast	Sck	TFL	Int	Yds	TD	Lng	PD	FF	FR	Yds	TD
2006	IND	**4**	0	3	2	**1**	0.0	0	0	0	0	0	0	0	**2**	**3**	0
2007	IND	1	**1**	6	**6**	0	0.0	0	0	0	0	0	**1**	0	0	0	0
2008	IND	1	**1**	**7**	**6**	**1**	0.0	0	0	0	0	0	0	0	0	0	0
2010	IND	1	0	3	3	0	0.0	0	0	0	0	0	0	0	0	0	0
		7	2	19	17	2	0.0	0	0	0	0	0	1	0	2	3	0
