= Thomas V. Draude =

United States Marine Corps general

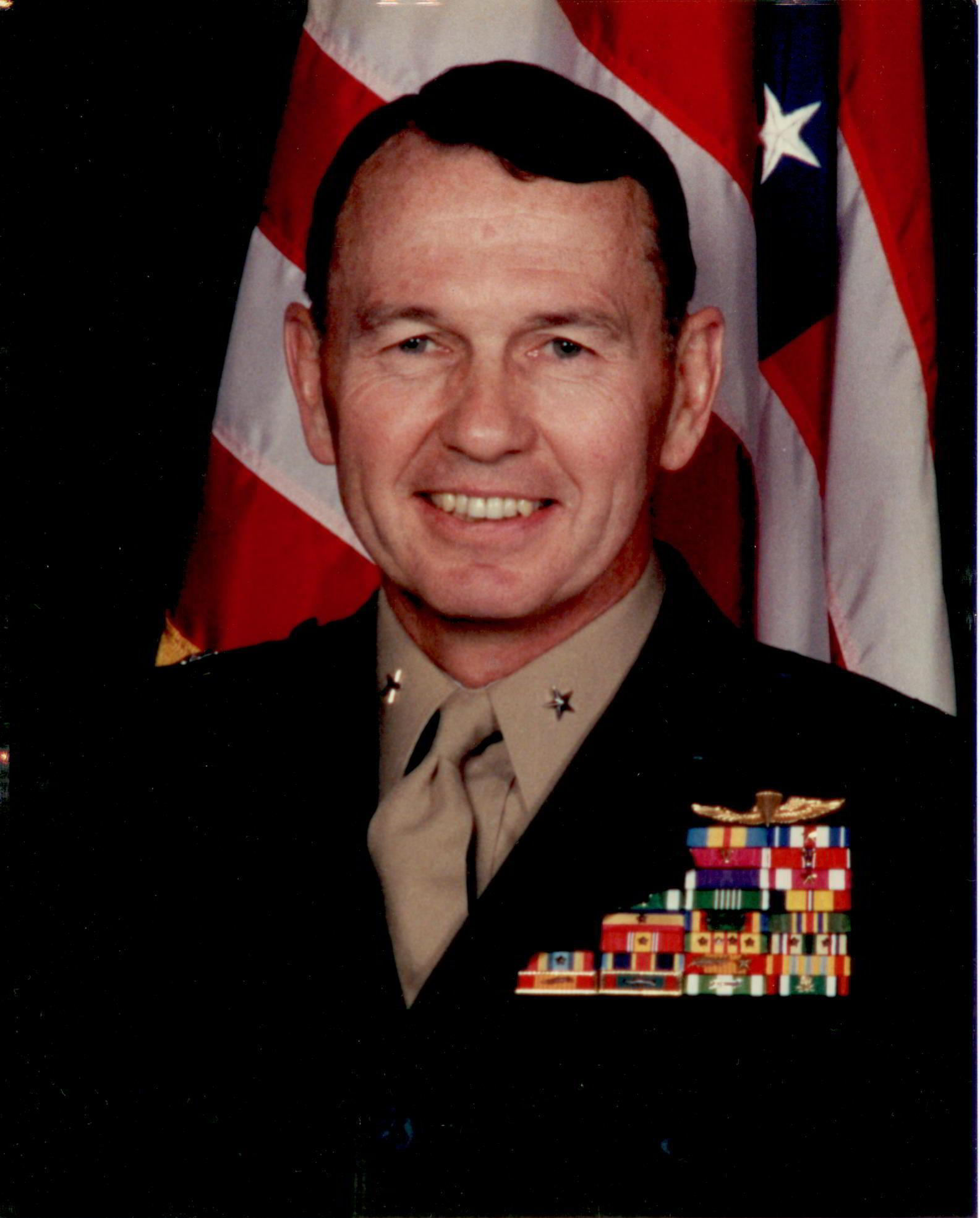
- Born: April 25, 1940 (age 86); Kankakee, Illinois, U.S.
- Military career
- Allegiance: United States
- Branch: United States Marine Corps
- Service years: 1962-1993
- Rank: Brigadier General
- Nickname: Sage
- Commands: Company "M", 3rd Battalion, 7th Marines; Marine Embassy Guard Europe; 5th Marines; 1st Marine Division, ADC
- Conflicts: Vietnam War; Operation Desert Storm
- Awards: Silver Star Medal(2); Legion of Merit Medal w/ Combat V Bronze Star Medal w/ Combat V Purple Heart Medal; Defense Distinguished Service Medal; Navy Distinguished Service Medal
- Other work: USAA, Marine Corps University Foundation, Saint Leo University, University of South Florida

Thomas V. Draude (born April 25, 1940) is a retired United States Marine Brigadier General. Draude retired in 1993 after 31 years of military service. Since retirement, Draude served with USAA and the Marine Corps University Foundation. He is currently an adjunct faculty member of University of South Florida in Tampa, Florida, teaching on courses on The Vietnam War and U.S. Military War Doctrine.

== Early life ==
Thomas V. Draude was born on April 25, 1940, in Kankakee, Illinois. His father, Henry Joseph Draude, was a German immigrant who worked as a plumber and steam fitter from age 14 until his death in 1978. His mother, Marjorie Cloonen Draude, daughter of Irish immigrants, was a registered nurse and the Kankakee County Tuberculosis nurse at the time of her death in 1960. His sister, Helen Ingram, died in 1992. His other sister, Sharon, resides in Kankakee.

Draude graduated as Valedictorian from St. Patrick Central High School (now Bishop McNamara High School) in 1958 and was captain of his school's first undefeated football team. He was selected to the McNamara Hall of Honor.

He graduated with distinction from the U.S. Naval Academy in 1962 and was selected to compete as a Rhodes Scholar. While at the academy he was a member of the Plebe Football team and President of the Cardinal Neuman Club.

== Marine Corps career ==
He was selected to remain after graduation from Annapolis to teach drill and marksmanship to the incoming plebe Class of 1966. He then served as an Assistant Operations officer until reporting to The Basic School in December 1962. He graduated with honors in June 1963 and reported to 3rd Battalion 1st Marines, Camp Pendleton. This unit was part of the 30 month Transplacement Program which formed in Camp Pendleton, sailed to Okinawa for 13 months and was designated 1st Battalion 3rd Marines. At the end of its overseas period, it sailed back to Camp Pendleton and was re-designated 1st Battalion 7th Marines.

Draude began as a weapons platoon commander and then became a rifle platoon commander. In March 1964 he and his reinforced platoon were deployed from Okinawa to Da Nang, South Vietnam. The platoon was to provide security for the Marine Air Base Squadron supporting Marine helicopter squadrons which were supporting South Vietnamese Armed Forces. This platoon also was part of the security for Da Nang Air Base and elements spent time with U.S. Army Special Forces units at Khe Sanh and A Shau. Upon their return to Okinawa, Draude became the company executive officer and was later selected to be the battalion adjutant. The battalion mounted out in response to the Gulf of Tonkin attack and remained afloat until its return to Okinawa, then back to California.

In preparation for sure participation in the Vietnam War, the battalion participated in Operation Silver Lance, in January 1965, in amphibious exercise simulating challenges it would face later. In May 1965 it deployed as the lead element of RLT-7 led by Colonel (later General) Oscar Peatross. Upon return to Okinawa it was designated the Seventh Fleet Special Landing Force and took part in Operation Starlite, the largest U.S. operation in South Vietnam up to that time. Draude served as battalion adjutant until October 1965 when he returned to Company "M", where he had started two years earlier, as executive officer. In January 1966 his company commander was wounded and evacuated. Draude took command and remained until August, extending his tour in Vietnam to remain with his company. During his tour he was promoted to captain and took part in operations near Chu Lai. For his actions he received two awards of the Silver Star Medal, the Purple Heart Medal, the Combat Action Ribbon, and the Vietnamese Cross of Gallantry Medal with Palm.

Draude was then assigned as one of the first groups of Marine Instructors at the U.S. Army's John F. Kennedy Special Warfare Center and School. For his service he received the Army Commendation Medal. He then attended the Marine Corps Amphibious Warfare School, graduating with honors, and continued at the Marine Advisor Course in preparation for his assignment to the Republic of Vietnam Marine Corps.

Arriving in Saigon in May 1969 he initially joined the 6th Battalion for operations in Tay Ninh to eject People's Army of Vietnam forces. For his actions, he was awarded the Navy Commendation Medal with Combat "V". He served subsequently as an assistant brigade advisor and senior advisor to the 5th Battalion. This was during the Vietnamization phase of the war with more responsibilities assigned to the Vietnamese units as U.S. forces drew down. The area of operations for 5th Battalion was primarily IV Corps and eventually Cambodia as part of the 1970 invasion. For his service with the Vietnamese he was awarded the Bronze Star Medal with Combat "V", the Vietnamese Cross of Gallantry with Bronze Star, and the Vietnamese Honor Medal, First Class.

=== Silver Star citation ===
Citation:

The President of the United States of America takes pleasure in presenting the Silver Star to Captain Thomas V. Draude (MCSN: 0-89211), United States Marine Corps, for conspicuous gallantry and intrepidity in action while serving as Commanding Officer of Company M, Third Battalion, Seventh Marines, FIRST Marine Division (Rein.), FMF, in the Republic of Vietnam. On 21 April 1966, the Company was engaged in a search and destroy operations against insurgent communist (Viet Cong) forces in Quang Ngai Province when two of Captain Draude's platoons came under intense small arms, automatic weapons and mortar fire from a well concealed and entrenched Viet Cong unit of company size. Without hesitation, Captain Draude immediately moved to the point of contact to observe the hamlet and to personally supervise the maneuver of his Company. Realizing the strength of the enemy, he withdrew his units to a safe position and effectively used every supporting weapon available to him to annihilate the enemy positions. In the late daylight hours, Captain Draude against attacked the hamlet. With full knowledge of the hazards involved, and with complete disregard for his own safety, he repeatedly exposed himself to enemy fire while directing the operations of his forces. He moved from position to position, encouraging his men, while setting an example of calmness and courage. In the vigorous assault, the enemy was routed from the hamlet. By the light of the burning huts, Captain Draude swiftly organized his position and swiftly set about retrieving and evacuating the Company's dead and wounded. Although physically exhausted, Captain Draude searched the burning hamlet to insure that every member of the Command was accounted for. On finding a mortally wounded Marine who had been overlooked earlier, Captain Draude carried the injured man to the evacuation point, 400 meters away. Largely as a result of Captain Draude's professional ability and stirring example, thirty-one Viet Cong were killed. By his valiant actions, extraordinary courage and inspiring leadership throughout, Captain Draude upheld the highest traditions of the Marine Corps and of the United States Naval Service.

=== Marine Corps career (post Vietnam War) ===
Draude reported to the United States Naval Academy in June 1970 and served two years as a Company Officer and one year as Brigade Performance Officer. For his three years of service he was awarded a Meritorious Service Medal. During this tour he was promoted to major.

Reporting to Frankfurt, West Germany, he assumed command of Company "A" Marine Security Guard Battalion. His command of Marine Security Guards at Embassies and Consulates stretched from Moscow Soviet Union, to Reykjavík, Iceland, to Nicosia, Cyprus. In 1975 he reported as a student at the U.S. Army Command and General Staff College, Ft. Leavenworth, Kansas. He graduated with honors and with a Master of Military Art and Service degree. His Master's paper was on the relief of battalion commanders and below during the Vietnam War.

In 1976 Draude became the executive officer, 1st Battalion, 5th Marines, and later the S-4 of the 5th Marines. During a Palm Tree exercise at 29 Palms featuring a mechanized task force, he tested a concept of logistic support which proved successful. He then spent a year in Okinawa as the III MAF assistant plans officer. This tour culminated with a multi-battalion exercise on Okinawa named Fortress Gale. During this tour he was promoted to lieutenant colonel.

His next assignment was at Headquarters Marine Corps, as an action officer in the Joint Strategic Planning Branch. His responsibilities included the Joint Strategic Capabilities Plan, the Joint Strategic Long Range Appraisal, and various special projects. He was awarded a second Meritorious Service Medal for his performance. He was then assigned to the National War College as a student, graduating in 1982. Reporting to Headquarters, Fleet Marine Force, Pacific (United States Marine Corps Forces Pacific) in Hawaii, he was assigned to the G-3 section as Ground Operations officer. Selected to the grade of Colonel in 1983, he then became inspector of FMF, Pac until his assignment as G-1 FMF.

In 1985 he reported to First Marine Division as G-3. In this assignment he developed a concept of division command post configuration stressing survivability and mobility to include night displacements with tactical and jump command posts. He then returned to the "Fighting Fifth Marines" as its commanding officer. He focused the regiment on the next war, emphasizing fire support coordination and practicing Suppression of Enemy Air Defense with artillery fire protecting close air support aircraft. Draude served as commanding officer of 5th Marine Regiment from 15 May 1986 to 9 November 1987. In 1987 Draude reported to Headquarters Marine Corps for duty as the Secretary of the General Staff working for the Chief of Staff of the Marine Corps. Selected to the grade of brigadier general in 1989, he was assigned to the Pentagon under the Deputy Secretary of Defense. His assignment was to implement David Packard's Defense Management Report, designed to improve efficiencies and find savings in the United States Department of Defense. At the end of one year the implementations was completed, and he volunteered to serve in Desert Shield. For his service he was awarded the Defense Distinguished Service Medal. Assigned to be the Assistant Division Commander of the First Marine Division, he joined the division in Saudi Arabia in October 1990. The division's focus changed from defensive to offensive in November with the arrival of the Second Marine Division. Draude's focus was on the logistics support of the division as well as planning artillery raids and the assault into Kuwait. He was also designated the deception officer for Marine Forces using amphibious forces, tanks, artificial tanks and artillery pieces, and Task Force Troy to achieve surprise and capture of most of the Iraqi forces. For his performance he was awarded the Legion of Merit Medal with Combat "V".

His final assignment was Director of Public Affairs at Headquarters Marine Corps. His focus was maintaining the positive relationship established with the members of the media in Desert Shield/Desert Storm to enable the Marine Corps to tell its story to the American people. He also restructured the enlisted Public Affairs training to produce Marines capable of being spokespersons in all media channels. From March 1992 until his retirement he also served as President George H. W. Bush's Commission on the Assignment of women in the Armed Forces, one of two active duty personnel on the 15 member commission. It studied, reviewed, interviewed, and traveled for nine months before submitting its recommendations. In the process, it raised questions about the role of women in the military and raised the conscientiousness of the American people to this issue. Draude recommended that women be given a chance to qualify for positions previously denied them aboard combatant vessels and in combat aviation, and then be allowed to serve.

After 30 1/2 years of active service, Draude retired in 1992. For his years of service he was awarded the Navy Distinguished Service Medal at a ceremony conducted by his dearest friend (and former Commandant of the Marine Corps) General Charles C. Krulak, USMC.

== Post Marine Corps career ==
In February 1993 Draude began his next career with USAA, headquartered in San Antonio, Texas. He began as vice president of Support Services at the home office and was in charge of the vehicles and aircraft, printing and publishing, food services, supply and storage, and retail stores in the company.

Assigned as senior vice president and general manager of USAA's Western Region of its Property and Casualty line, Draude headed operations covering California, Arizona, Alaska, Hawaii, and Nevada. At this time USAA began expanding membership to enlisted members of the Armed Forces and their families as well as to officers. In response, Draude established a "Military 101" course for employees, most of whom had no military experience, to aid in their support of this expanding membership.

In February 1995 he was transferred to Tampa, Florida to head the Southeast Region and its 1700 employees. The region covered the states of South Carolina, Georgia, Florida, Alabama, Mississippi, Louisiana, and the Caribbean Islands, and represented approximately 20% of the total USAA membership.

In the Spring of 2004, General Draude was contacted by General Carl E. Mundy who was Chairman of the Marine Corps University Foundation in Quantico, Virginia. The Foundation was seeking a new CEO and General Draude was asked to consider competing for the position. He was selected and began his service in September 2004.

The Foundation is the development arm for the Marine Corps University (MCU) as well as the support of the Operating Forces and Supporting Establishment of the entire Marine Corps. Its focus is on Professional Military Education and Leadership provided by Academic Chairs, visiting scholars, battlefield studies and other related activities. The Foundation also provided the initial funding for the Leadership Communication Skills Center in 2005 that ensured the re-accreditation of MCU by the Southern Association of Colleges and Schools (SACS). MCUF did so again in 2015 with its funding of The Center for Problem Solving and Critical Thinking, an additional MCU educational program, to complete the SACS requirement for re-accreditation. MCUF also initiated the Center for Case Studies which uses the Case Method to educate Marines at MCU, The Basic School, and throughout the Marine Corps, from the grades of private to general officer.

General Draude also taught an elective at the Marine Corps Command and Staff College (C&SC). His course on Information Operations satisfied the academic requirement for awarding the additional Military Occupational Specialty of Information Operations Staff Officer. Nearly one hundred Marine Officers were eligible for this specialty designation as a result of completing this elective and participating in the C&SC's Exercise "Nine Innings" at the end of the Academic Year.

For his service to MCU, it awarded General Draude an honorary doctoral degree in Warfare Studies and the Leonard F. Chapman, Jr. Award for outstanding service to the Foundation. The Expeditionary Warfare School named its auditorium after him in recognition of his service to its students.

He retired as president and CEO of MCUF on 30 June 2015 and resides in Tampa, Florida.

== Writing experience ==
In 2023, Draude published his first full-length non-fiction effort, a business leadership tome called The 4 F's of Leadership: Lessons from the Battlefield to the Boardroom. Draude's effort is an examination of aspects of leadership that are rarely discussed or shared: Fatigue, Fear, Failure and Feelings. In this book, Draude reflects on his over thirty years in the Marine Corps as well as his subsequent twenty-five years of experience in leadership in the business and non-profit worlds.

Draude's unusual approach focuses on four critical competencies and how to navigate each through his own lens of experience and interpretation. Draude believes that successful leadership in both the military and civilian sectors requires an understanding of these four under-appreciated topics, which we should recognize as part of our human nature. The book is currently rated at 4.9 out of 5.0 from reader feedback on Amazon.

== Adjunct professor experience ==
Since 2016, Draude has been an adjunct professor at several Tampa-area universities (St.Leo 2016–2019; University of South Florida 2016-current), instructing to undergraduate students on a variety of military and political science topics.

Draude has featured two core classes that were leveraged at both higher education institutions: "The Vietnam War" and "Why and How We Fight U.S. Wars". Both courses feature Draude's innovative hub instruction framework, which feature a wide range of guest speakers that each speak to a unique aspect of the topical matter, in an intentional effort for the students to benefit from wide and differentiated perspectives that challenge traditional opinions on both the challenging times of the Vietnam War era, as well as the policy and lens of our nation's war-time military decision making.

As an example, the Vietnam class has featured Draude's own experiences as a young Marine Corps officer, but also those of war protesters, Vietnamese boat people and political figures involved in negotiations and decision-making.

== Personal ==
Draude has been married to Marysandra Campagna Draude, a former Marine officer, since November 1966. They have three children:, Loree, a former naval aviator (F/A-18 and Lockheed S-3 Viking); Patrick, a retired Naval Intelligence commander and now a military analyst for the Federal Government; and Ryan, Head of Loyalty and Digital at Giant Food LLC, and a part-time adjunct professor of Loyalty Strategy at Georgetown University and Omnichannel Marketing at George Washington University. They also have four grandchildren, Sam, Julia, Priya and Leena.

== Decorations and medals ==
Brigadier General Draude's decorations and medals include:

Navy and Marine Corps Parachutist Insignia
| 1st Row | | Defense Distinguished Service Medal | Navy Distinguished Service Medal | |
| 2nd Row | Silver Star w/ gold star | Legion of Merit w/ valor device | Bronze Star Medal w/ valor device | Purple Heart |
| 3rd Row | Meritorious Service Medal w/ 1 gold star | Navy Commendation Medal w/ valor device | Army Commendation Medal | Combat Action Ribbon |
| 4th Row | Navy Presidential Unit Citation w/ 1 bronze star | Navy Unit Commendation w/ 3 bronze stars | Navy Meritorious Unit Commendation | National Defense Service Medal w/ 1 bronze star |
| 5th Row | Vietnam Service Medal w/ 1 silver star & 3 bronze stars | Southwest Asia Service Medal w/ 2 bronze stars | Navy Sea Service Deployment Ribbon w/ 1 bronze star | Navy & Marine Corps Overseas Service Ribbon |
| 6th Row | Marine Corps Security Guard Ribbon | Republic of Vietnam Cross of Gallantry with palm & bronze star | Armed Forces Honor Medal First Class | Vietnam Gallantry Cross unit citation with palm |
| 7th Row | Vietnam Civil Actions unit citation | Republic of Vietnam Campaign Medal | Kuwait Liberation Medal (Saudi Arabia) | Kuwait Liberation Medal (Kuwait) |

- Note: The gold US Navy Parachute Rigger badge was worn unofficially by USMC personnel in place of US Army parachutist badge from 1942 to 1963 before it officially became the Navy and Marine Corps Parachutist insignia on July 12, 1963, per BuPers Notice 1020. Members of the Marine Corps who attended jump school before 1963 were issued the silver Army parachutist badge but may be depicted wearing the gold Navy Parachute Rigger badge as it was common practice during this time period.
