= Blair White =

American football player (born 1987)

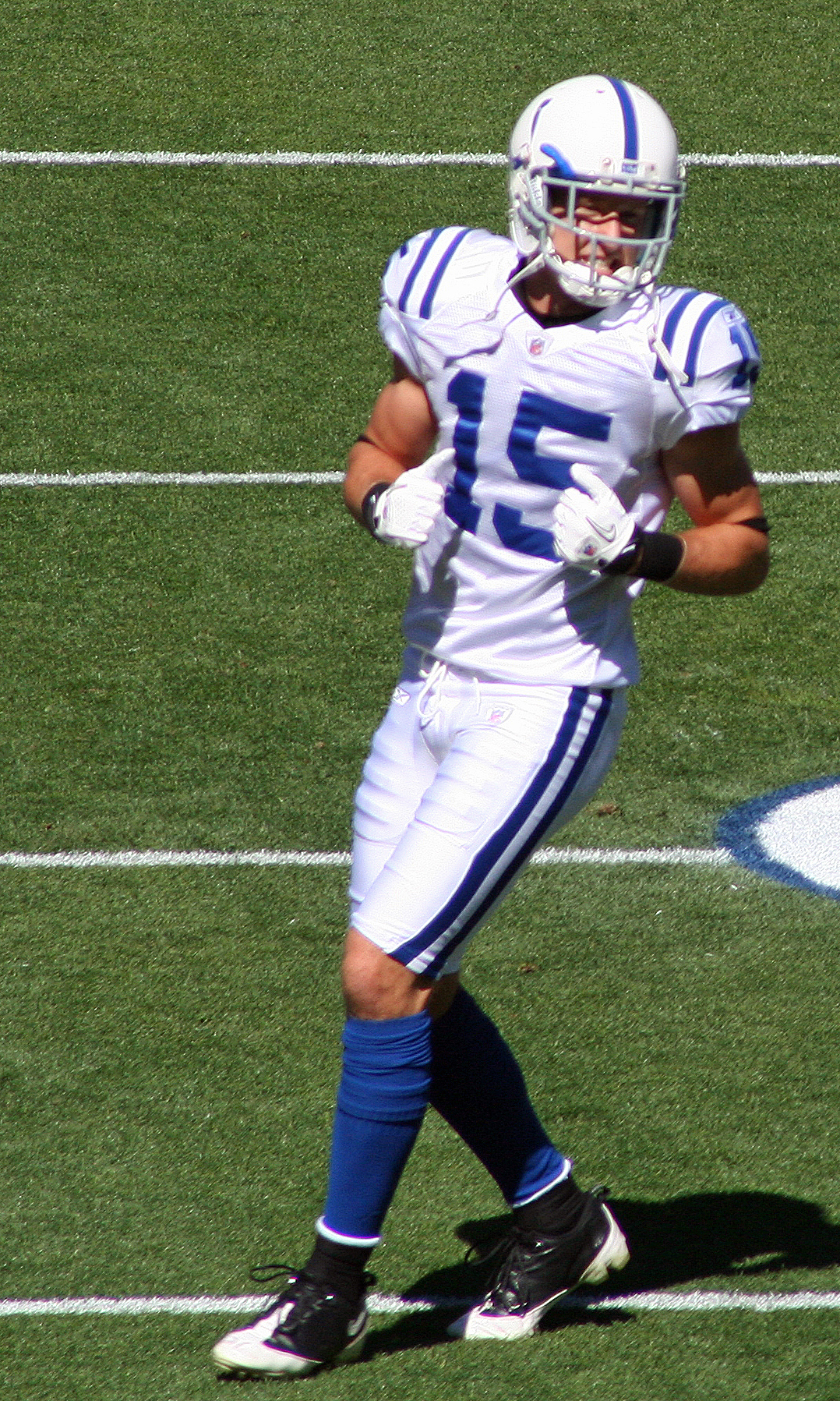
- White with the Indianapolis Colts in 2010

No. 15
- Position: Wide receiver

Personal information
- Born: February 20, 1987 (age 39); Saginaw, Michigan, U.S.
- Listed height: 6 ft 2 in (1.88 m)
- Listed weight: 205 lb (93 kg)

Career information
- High school: Nouvel Catholic (MI)
- College: Michigan State
- NFL draft: 2010: undrafted

Career history
- Indianapolis Colts (2010–2011)

Awards and highlights
- First-team All-Big Ten (2009)

Career NFL statistics
- Receptions: 36
- Receiving yards: 355
- Receiving touchdowns: 5
- Stats at Pro Football Reference

Blair White (born February 20, 1987) is an American former professional football player who was a wide receiver in the National Football League (NFL). After playing college football for the Michigan State Spartans, he was signed by the Indianapolis Colts as an undrafted free agent in 2010. He played for the Colts for two seasons from 2010 to 2011.

== Early life ==
White attended Nouvel Catholic Central High School in Saginaw, Michigan. As a senior, he had 63 receptions for 800 yards and 10 touchdowns. He also was two-year starter at guard on the basketball team and played baseball as a pitcher and first baseman.

== College career ==
At Michigan State University, White joined the Spartans as a walk-on in 2005. After seeing limited time as a freshman and sophomore, he started five of 13 games as a junior. He finished the season with a team leading 43 receptions for 659 yards and a touchdown. He was a second-team All-Big Ten selection by Phil Steele. As a senior, he started all 13 games and had 70 receptions for 990 yards and nine touchdowns. He was named first-team All-Big Ten by the coaches and second-team by the media.

White finished his college career with 18 starts in 40 games, 116 receptions for 1674 yards and 10 touchdowns. He also earned First-team Academic All-America honors and Academic All-Big Ten Honors all four years of his college career.

== Professional career ==
=== Rookie season ===
White was signed as an undrafted free agent by the Indianapolis Colts on April 24, 2010. After spending the first couple of weeks on the Colts practice squad, he was promoted to the active roster on September 26, 2010 after an injury to Pierre Garçon. He scored his first NFL touchdown in his NFL debut on a pass from Colts quarterback Peyton Manning against the Denver Broncos on September 26, 2010. White finished the 2010 season with 36 receptions for 355 yards and five touchdowns.

=== 2011 season ===
In 2011 Blair played in 7 games but was severely limited by back injuries. He recorded no receptions, returning 7 punts for 22 yards. He was waived following the 2011 season on April 13, 2012.

He opted to leave the NFL at 25.

=== Regular season ===
Year	Team	Games		Receiving					Rushing					Fumbles	
Year	Team	GP	GS	Rec	Yds	Avg	Lng	TD	Att	Yds	Avg	Lng	TD	Fum	Lost
2010	IND	13	4	36	355	9.9	33	5	0	0	0	0	0	1	0
2011	IND	7	0	0	0	0	0	0	0	0	0	0	0	0	0
Career		20	4	36	355	9.9	33	5	0	0	0.0	0	0	1	0

=== Postseason ===
Year	Team	Games		Receiving					Rushing					Fumbles	
Year	Team	GP	GS	Rec	Yds	Avg	Lng	TD	Att	Yds	Avg	Lng	TD	Fum	Lost
2010	IND	1	0	6	54	9.0	0	0	0	0	0	0	0	0	0
Career		1	0	6	54	9.0	0	0	0	0	0	0	0	0	0

== Post-football ==
He gave up on forcing his NFL career while not being at 100%. He has had three back surgeries and still experiences some pain. “Sometimes I see the receivers get hit, and I don’t miss that part of it. I do miss the catches. I miss the touchdowns. But I don’t miss the hits.”

He enrolled in dental school University of Detroit-Mercy, something he had planned for before football.
