= Gijon Robinson =

American football player (born 1984)

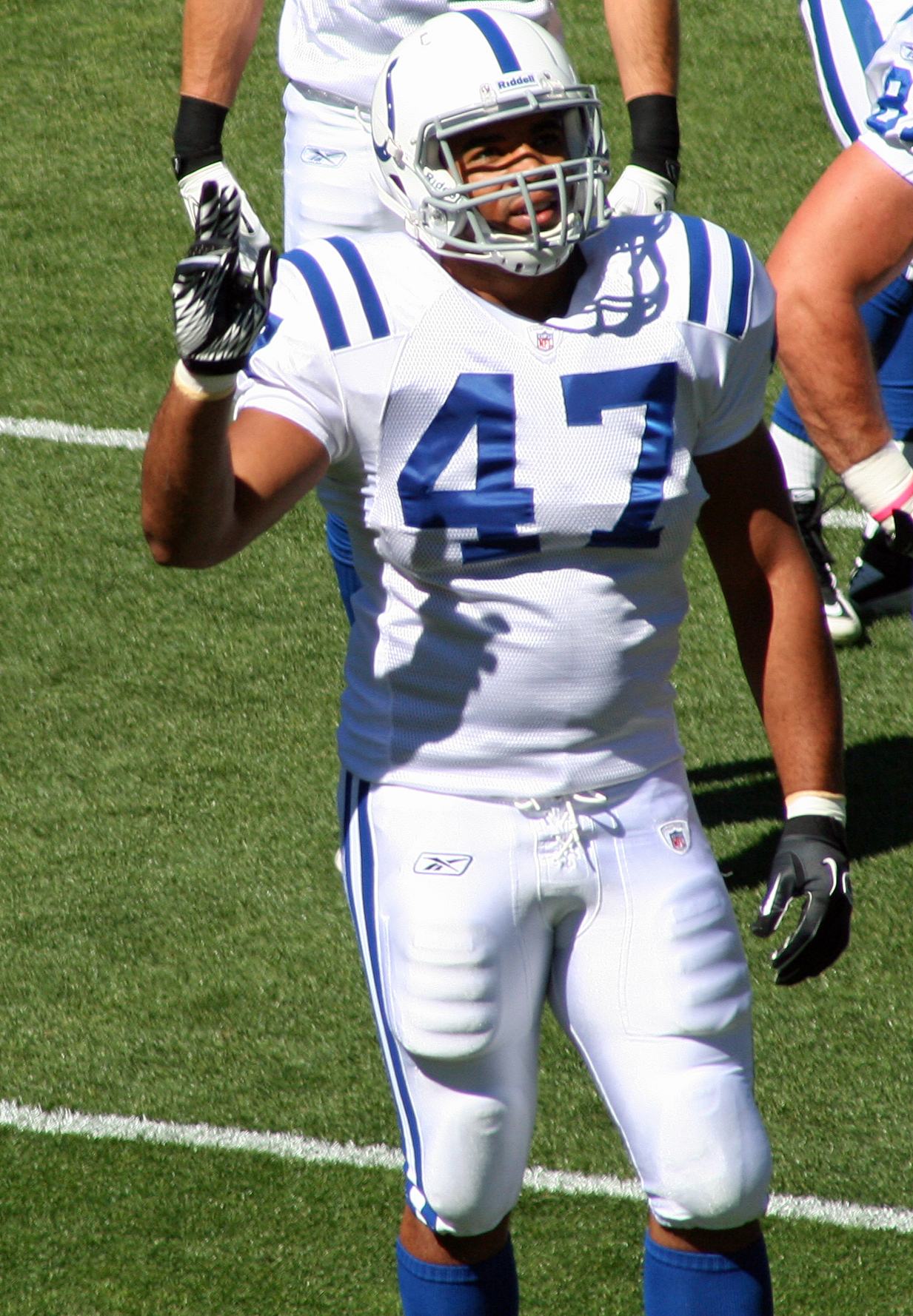

No. 47
- Position: Tight end / Fullback

Personal information
- Born: October 12, 1984 (age 42); Denver, Colorado, U.S.
- Listed height: 6 ft 1 in (1.85 m)
- Listed weight: 255 lb (116 kg)

Career information
- High school: Waynesville (MO)
- College: Missouri Western State (2003–2006)
- NFL draft: 2007: undrafted

Career history
- Indianapolis Colts (2007–2010); Detroit Lions (2011)*; Jacksonville Jaguars (2012)*; San Francisco 49ers (2012)*
- * Offseason or practice squad member only

Career NFL statistics
- Receptions: 31
- Receiving yards: 240
- Receiving average: 7.7
- Receiving touchdowns: 1
- Stats at Pro Football Reference

Gijon Milque Robinson (born October 12, 1984) is an American former professional football player who was a tight end and fullback in the National Football League (NFL). He played college football for the Missouri Western Griffons and was signed by the Indianapolis Colts of the National Football League as an undrafted free agent in 2007. He currently resides in Fort Leonard Wood, Missouri and attended high school at Waynesville High School.

== Professional career ==
Pre-draft measurables
Height	Weight	Arm length	Hand span	40-yard dash	10-yard split	20-yard split	20-yard shuttle	Vertical jump	Broad jump	Bench press
6 ft 0 3/4 in (1.85 m)	255 lb (116 kg)	33 3/8 in (0.85 m)	9 1/2 in (0.24 m)	4.76 s	1.68 s	2.75 s	4.43 s	33.0 in (0.84 m)	9 ft 8 in (2.95 m)	21 reps

He was signed by the Jacksonville Jaguars on July 27, 2012, and later released on August 2.

He was released by the San Francisco 49ers on August 15, 2012.
