= Jacques McClendon =

American football player and executive (born 1987)

Personal information
- Born: December 10, 1987 (age 38); Cleveland, Tennessee, U.S.
- Listed height: 6 ft 3 in (1.91 m)
- Listed weight: 310 lb (141 kg)

Career information
- High school: Baylor (Chattanooga, Tennessee)
- College: Tennessee (2006-2009)
- NFL draft: 2010: 4th round, 129th overall pick

Career history

Playing
- Indianapolis Colts (2010); Detroit Lions (2011); Pittsburgh Steelers (2012)*; Atlanta Falcons (2012–2013)*; Jacksonville Jaguars (2013–2014); Miami Dolphins (2015); Jacksonville Jaguars (2016)*
- * Offseason or practice squad member only

Operations
- Los Angeles Rams (2017–2023); Director of player engagement (2017–2020); Director of football affairs (2021–2023)

Awards and highlights
- As an executive: Super Bowl champion (LVI)

Career NFL statistics
- Games played: 25
- Games started: 5
- Stats at Pro Football Reference

Jacques Rashaud McClendon (born December 10, 1987) is an American former professional football player and former football executive. He played center in the National Football League (NFL) for six different teams from 2010-2016. He currently works for WME Sports as their vice president of football coaching operations, serving as an agent for football coaches and executives. Prior to joining WME Sports, McClendon was an executive for the Los Angeles Rams from 2017-2023, initially as their director of player engagement, and later as their director of football affairs.

McClendon was selected by the Indianapolis Colts in the fourth round of the 2010 NFL draft. He played college football for the Tennessee Volunteers. He also serves on the Knight Commission for Intercollegiate Athletics.

== Early life ==
McClendon played in the U.S. Army All-American Bowl, which features the top high school football players in the country. He also was named the Gatorade Player of the Year for the state of Tennessee.

== College career ==
McClendon appeared in 49 games at the University of Tennessee, including 26 starts. He was a three time Academic All-SEC selection and holds a master's degree in Sports Management.

== Professional career ==
=== Indianapolis Colts ===
On April 24, 2010, McClendon was selected by the Indianapolis Colts in the fourth round (129th overall) in the 2010 NFL draft. He appeared in four games as a rookie. On September 4, 2011, he was waived.

=== Detroit Lions ===
On September 4, 2011, he was claimed off waivers by the Detroit Lions. His contract expired following the 2011 season, making him a free agent.

=== Pittsburgh Steelers ===
McClendon signed with the Pittsburgh Steelers during the 2012 season. He was released by the team on November 2.

=== Atlanta Falcons ===
On November 7, 2012, the Falcons signed McClendon to their practice squad. On January 21, 2013, he signed a 2-year, $1.2 million contract with the Atlanta Falcons.

=== Jacksonville Jaguars (first stint) ===
He was claimed off waivers by the Jacksonville Jaguars on September 1, 2013. He started the final two games of the 2013 season for the Jaguars following injuries to Mike Brewster and Will Rackley. He became a free agent after the 2014 season.

=== Miami Dolphins ===
On April 22, 2015, McClendon was signed by the Miami Dolphins. On September 11, 2015, he was released by the Dolphins. On September 14, 2015, he was re-signed by the Dolphins. On September 26, 2015, he was waived by the Dolphins. On December 1, 2015, McClendon was signed by the Dolphins. On December 15 he was once again waived. On December 22, 2015, McClendon was re-signed by the Dolphins.

On March 11, 2016, the Dolphins re-signed McClendon to a 1-year, $840,000 contract.

=== Jacksonville Jaguars (second stint) ===
On August 17, 2016, McClendon was signed by the Jaguars. On September 3, 2016, he was released by the Jaguars.

=== Los Angeles Rams ===
McClendon was hired as the Los Angeles Rams' Director of Player Engagement in 2017, a role he held for four seasons. He became the team’s Director of Football affairs from 2021-2023. He was on the Rams' staff that won Super Bowl LVI.

=== WME Sports ===
McClendon left the Rams after the conclusion of the 2023 season. He is now the vice president of football coaching operations for WME Sports, serving as an agent for various football coaches and executives.
