= 2010 Detroit Lions season =

NFL team season

- Owner: William Clay Ford Sr.
- General manager: Martin Mayhew
- Head coach: Jim Schwartz
- Home stadium: Ford Field

Results
- Record: 6–10
- Division place: 3rd NFC North
- Playoffs: Did not qualify
- Pro Bowlers: DT Ndamukong Suh; WR Calvin Johnson

The 2010 season was the Detroit Lions' 81st in the National Football League (NFL) and their second under head coach Jim Schwartz. They spent most of the season at the bottom of the NFC North, but with more division wins than the Minnesota Vikings (whose overall record was the same), the Lions ended up at third place on the final day of the season with a victory over that team. They were eliminated from playoff contention after their Thanksgiving Day loss, extending their postseason drought to 11 seasons, tied with the Buffalo Bills for the longest active streak in the NFL. High points of the season included two division wins, the first being a 7–3 victory over the eventual Super Bowl XLV champion Green Bay Packers that snapped a 19-game losing streak against division opponents, and a four-game winning streak which included a victory against the Tampa Bay Buccaneers that ended their record 26-game road losing streak. The Lions also sent two players to the 2011 Pro Bowl: wide receiver Calvin Johnson and rookie defensive tackle Ndamukong Suh.

The Lions missed the playoffs for the eleventh straight season, tying a record set between 1971 and 1981. After the Week 13 loss to the Chicago Bears, the Lions hit a low point of 5 wins and 47 losses since their 44–7 win against the Denver Broncos in Week 9 of the 2007 season.

== Off-season ==
=== Roster changes ===
==== Free agents ====
Pos	Player	Tag	2010 Team	Signed
ILB	Cody Spencer	RFA		
G/T	Damion Cook	UFA	Omaha Nighthawks (UFL)	
QB	Daunte Culpepper	UFA	Sacramento Mountain Lions (UFL)	June 7
ILB	Larry Foote	UFA	Pittsburgh Steelers	March 15
CB	Anthony Henry	UFA		
CB	William James	UFA	San Francisco 49ers	May 5
QB	Patrick Ramsey	UFA	Omaha Nighthawks (UFL)	June 1
RB	Cedric Peerman	UFA	Cincinnati Bengals	April 27
WR	Michael Ray Garvin	UFA	Las Vegas Locomotives (UFL)	June 2
DT	Terrance Taylor	UFA		
S	DeAngelo Smith	UFA	Cleveland Browns	April 28
WR	Kole Heckendorf	UFA	Seattle Seahawks	May 12

==== Releases ====
Pos	Player	Released	2010 Team	Signed
CB	Phillip Buchanon	March 4	Washington Redskins	March 29
DT	Grady Jackson	March 5		
DE	Dewayne White	March 8	Omaha Nighthawks (UFL)	June 2
OG	Daniel Loper	April 15	Oakland Raiders	May 16
S	Kalvin Pearson	April 16		
CB	Kevin Hobbs	April 16	Miami Dolphins	August 12
CB	Brian Witherspoon	April 16	Carolina Panthers	April 16
SS	Daniel Bullocks	July 8	Omaha Nighthawks (UFL)	

==== Signings ====
Pos	Player	Tag	2009 Team	Signed
S	Jonathan Hefney	UFA	Winnipeg Blue Bombers (CFL)	January 4
LB	Ashlee Palmer	UFA	Buffalo Bills	February 18
WR	Nate Burleson	UFA	Seattle Seahawks	March 5
DT	Corey Williams	RFA	Cleveland Browns	March 5
DE	Kyle Vanden Bosch	UFA	Tennessee Titans	March 5
CB	Jonathan Wade	UFA	St. Louis Rams	March 8
CB	Chris Houston	RFA	Atlanta Falcons	March 8
QB	Shaun Hill	RFA	San Francisco 49ers	March 14
LB	Landon Johnson	UFA	Carolina Panthers	March 19
OG	Rob Sims	RFA	Seattle Seahawks	April 5
TE	Tony Scheffler	RFA	Denver Broncos	April 19
G	Trevor Canfield	RFA	Seattle Seahawks	April 19
DB	C.C. Brown	UFA	New York Giants	May 10
LB	Isaiah Ekejiuba	UFA	Oakland Raiders	July 23
DE	Lawrence Jackson	RFA	Seattle Seahawks	August 18
CB	T. J. Rushing	UFA	Indianapolis Colts	August 18
S	John Wendling	UFA	Buffalo Bills	August 27
TE	Spencer Havner	UFA	Green Bay Packers	September 5
WR	Stefan Logan	UFA	Pittsburgh Steelers	September 5
TE	J. J. Finley	UFA	San Francisco 49ers	September 8

==== Trades ====
- On September 4, the Lions traded Dan Gronkowski to Denver for Alphonso Smith.

==== 2010 Draft class ====
Round	Selection	Player	Position	College
1	2	Ndamukong Suh	DT	Nebraska
1	30^{a}	Jahvid Best	RB	California
3	66	Amari Spievey	CB	Iowa
4	128^{a}	Jason Fox	OT	Miami (FL)
7	213^{b}	Willie Young	DE	North Carolina State
7	255^{c}	Tim Toone	WR	Weber State

Denver traded its 2010 fifth-round selection and a 2009 seventh-round selection to Detroit for a 2009 sixth-round selection.

The Lions traded their original seventh-round pick to Buffalo for S Ko Simpson.

The Lions traded their 2010 sixth-round pick and a conditional 2011 seventh-round pick to Atlanta for CB Chris Houston.

The Lions traded a 2010 fifth-round pick (the pick they acquired from Denver) to Cleveland for DT Corey Williams and a 2010 seventh-round pick (214).

The Lions traded seventh-round pick 220 to Philadelphia for their 2011 sixth-round selection.

The Lions traded LB Ernie Sims to Philadelphia, the Broncos received a fifth-round pick from Philadelphia, and the Lions received TE Tony Scheffler and a 2010 seventh-round pick 220 from Denver in a three team trade.

^a The Lions traded their second-round pick, their original fourth-round pick and seventh-round pick 214 to Minnesota for their first-round pick and their fourth-round pick.

^b The Lions traded their 2010 fifth-round pick and DE Robert Henderson to Seattle for OG Rob Sims and their 2010 seventh-round pick.

^c Awarded to the Lions as a compensatory pick.

==== Undrafted free agents ====
Position	Player	College
WR	Michael Moore	Georgia
DT	Robert Callaway	Saginaw Valley State
TE	Richard Dickson	Louisiana State
CB	Aaron Berry	Pittsburgh
S	Randy Phillips	Miami (FL)
DE	Korey Bosworth	UCLA

== Staff ==
Detroit Lions 2010 staff
Front office: Owner/chairman – William Clay Ford Sr.; Vice chairman – William Clay Ford Jr.; President – Tom Lewand; Senior vice president/general manager – Martin Mayhew; Senior personnel executive – James "Shack" Harris; Vice president of football operations – Cedric Saunders; Vice president of pro personnel – Sheldon White; Director of college scouting – Scott McEwen; Assistant director of college scouting/national scout – Lance Newmark; Assistant director of pro personnel – Miller McCalmon; Assistant director of pro personnel – Charlie Sanders; Head coaches: Head coach – Jim Schwartz; Assistant head coach/defensive coordinator – Gunther Cunningham; Offensive coaches: Offensive coordinator – Scott Linehan; Assistant quarterbacks – Todd Downing; Running backs – Sam Gash; Wide receivers – Shawn Jefferson; Tight ends – Tim Lappano; Offensive line – George Yarno; Assistant offensive line – Jeremiah Washburn	Defensive coaches: Defensive line – Kris Kocurek; Linebackers – Matt Burke; Secondary – Tim Walton; Assistant secondary – Daron Roberts; Defensive assistant – Don Clemons; Special teams coaches: Special teams coordinator – Danny Crossman; Assistant special teams – Bradford Banta; Strength and conditioning: Coordinator of physical development – Jason Arapoff; Strength and conditioning assistant – Ted Rath

== Final roster ==
2010 Detroit Lions roster
Quarterbacks (QB): 14 Shaun Hill; 16 Zac Robinson; 5 Drew Stanton; Running backs (RB): 44 Jahvid Best; 21 Aaron Brown; 45 Jerome Felton FB; 28 Maurice Morris; Wide receivers (WR): 13 Nate Burleson; 87 Brian Clark; 80 Bryant Johnson; 81 Calvin Johnson; 11 Stefan Logan RS; Tight ends (TE): 89 Will Heller; 84 Brandon Pettigrew; 85 Tony Scheffler	Offensive linemen (OL): 76 Jeff Backus T; 70 Jason Fox T; 65 Dylan Gandy C; 78 Corey Hilliard T; 66 Stephen Peterman G; 51 Dominic Raiola C; 67 Rob Sims G; 74 Donald Thomas G; 71 Tony Ugoh T; Defensive linemen (DL): 92 Cliff Avril DE; 96 Andre Fluellen DT; 91 Sammie Lee Hill DT; 94 Lawrence Jackson DE; 75 Turk McBride DE; 90 Ndamukong Suh DT; 62 Barry Turner DE; 99 Corey Williams DT; 79 Willie Young DE	Linebackers (LB): 53 Caleb Campbell OLB; 59 Bobby Carpenter OLB; 52 Vinny Ciurciu ILB; 54 DeAndre Levy ILB; 58 Ashlee Palmer; 98 Julian Peterson OLB; Defensive backs (DB): 39 C. C. Brown SS; 26 Louis Delmas FS; 24 Tye Hill CB; 23 Chris Houston CB; 43 Eric King CB; 38 Prince Miller CB; 25 Randy Phillips FS; 36 Paul Pratt CB; 42 Amari Spievey SS; 30 Nathan Vasher CB; 29 John Wendling FS; Special teams (ST): 2 Nick Harris P; 48 Don Muhlbach LS; 3 Dave Rayner K	Practice squad: 10 Alric Arnett WR; 61 Rob Callaway DT; 40 Joe Jon Finley TE; 64 Dan Gerberry C; 83 Roy Hall WR; 41 Ian Johnson RB; 18 Tim Toone WR (IR); 37 Jonathon Hall CB; Reserve: 32 Aaron Berry CB (IR); 97 Korey Bosworth OLB (IR); 72 Trevor Canfield G (IR); 77 Gosder Cherilus T (IR); 95 Jared DeVries DE (IR); 46 Richard Dickson TE (IR); 57 Jordon Dizon OLB (IR); 50 Isaiah Ekejiuba ILB (IR); 49 Zack Follett OLB (IR); 4 Jason Hanson K (IR); 55 Landon Johnson OLB (IR); 33 Brandon McDonald CB (IR); 47 Jake Nordin FB (IR); 27 Alphonso Smith CB (IR); 34 Kevin Smith RB (IR); 9 Matthew Stafford QB (IR); 93 Kyle Vanden Bosch DE (IR); 12 Derrick Williams WR (IR); 31 Jack Williams CB (PUP); Rookies in italics 53 active, 20 reserve, 6 practice squad

== Schedule ==
=== Preseason ===
Week	Date	Opponent	Result	Record	Venue	Recap
1	August 14	at Pittsburgh Steelers	**L** 23–7	0–1	Heinz Field	Recap
2	August 21	at Denver Broncos	**W** 25–20	1–1	Invesco Field at Mile High	Recap
3	August 28	Cleveland Browns	**W** 35–27	2–1	Ford Field	Recap
4	September 2	Buffalo Bills	**W** 28–23	3–1	Ford Field	Recap

=== Regular season ===
Week	Date	Opponent	Result	Record	Venue	Recap
1	September 12	at **Chicago Bears**	**L** 14–19	0–1	Soldier Field	Recap
2	September 19	Philadelphia Eagles	**L** 32–35	0–2	Ford Field	Recap
3	September 26	at **Minnesota Vikings**	**L** 10–24	0–3	Hubert H. Humphrey Metrodome	Recap
4	October 3	at **Green Bay Packers**	**L** 26–28	0–4	Lambeau Field	Recap
5	October 10	St. Louis Rams	**W** 44–6	1–4	Ford Field	Recap
6	October 17	at New York Giants	**L** 20–28	1–5	New Meadowlands Stadium	Recap
7	Bye					
8	October 31	Washington Redskins	**W** 37–25	2–5	Ford Field	Recap
9	November 7	New York Jets	**L** 20–23 (OT)	2–6	Ford Field	Recap
10	November 14	at Buffalo Bills	**L** 12–14	2–7	Ralph Wilson Stadium	Recap
11	November 21	at Dallas Cowboys	**L** 19–35	2–8	Cowboys Stadium	Recap
12	November 25	New England Patriots	**L** 24–45	2–9	Ford Field	Recap
13	December 5	**Chicago Bears**	**L** 20–24	2–10	Ford Field	Recap
14	December 12	**Green Bay Packers**	**W** 7–3	3–10	Ford Field	Recap
15	December 19	at Tampa Bay Buccaneers	**W** 23–20 (OT)	4–10	Raymond James Stadium	Recap
16	December 26	at Miami Dolphins	**W** 34–27	5–10	Sun Life Stadium	Recap
17	January 2	**Minnesota Vikings**	**W** 20–13	6–10	Ford Field	Recap

Note: Intra-division opponents are in bold text.

Indicates that throwback uniforms were worn.

== Standings ==
NFC North
	W	L	T	PCT	DIV	CONF	PF	PA	STK
^{(2)} Chicago Bears	11	5	0	.688	5–1	8–4	334	286	L1
^{(6)} Green Bay Packers	10	6	0	.625	4–2	8–4	388	240	W2
Detroit Lions	6	10	0	.375	2–4	5–7	362	369	W4
Minnesota Vikings	6	10	0	.375	1–5	5–7	281	348	L1

== Regular season results ==
=== Week 1: at Chicago Bears ===
Week 1: Detroit Lions at Chicago Bears – Game summary

Quarter	1	2	3	4	Total
Lions	7	7	0	0	14
Bears	3	10	0	6	19

at Soldier Field, Chicago, Illinois

- Date: September 12
- Game time: 12:00 pm CDT
- Game weather: 75 °F or 23.9 °C (Sunny)
- Game attendance: 62,080
- Referee: Gene Steratore
- TV announcers (Fox): Thom Brennaman, Brian Billick and Charissa Thompson
- Recap
  Gamebook

Game information

First quarter

- CHI – Robbie Gould 20-yard field goal, Bears 3–0, Drive: 11 plays, 64 yards, 5:57.
- DET – Jahvid Best 7-yard run (Jason Hanson kick), Lions 7–3, Drive: 7 plays, 42 yards, 3:18.

Second quarter

- DET – Jahvid Best 4-yard run (Jason Hanson kick), Lions 14–3, Drive: 10 plays, 60 yards, 4:33.
- CHI – Matt Forte 89-yard pass from Jay Cutler (Robbie Gould kick), Lions 14–10, Drive: 1 plays, 79 yards, 0:27.
- CHI – Robbie Gould 31-yard field goal, Lions 14–13, Drive: 4 plays, 24 yards, 0:20.

Third quarter

- No scoring plays

Fourth quarter

- CHI – Matt Forte 28-yard pass from Jay Cutler (pass failed), Bears 19–14, Drive: 6 plays, 56 yards, 1:49.

Top passers

- DET – Shaun Hill – 9/19, 88 yards, 1 interception
- CHI – Jay Cutler – 23/35, 372 yards, 2 touchdowns, 1 interception

Top rushers

- DET – Jahvid Best – 14 rushes, 20 yards, 2 touchdowns
- CHI – Matt Forte – 17 rushes, 50 yards

Top receivers

- DET – Calvin Johnson – 4 receptions, 45 yards
- CHI – Matt Forte – 7 receptions, 151 yards, 2 touchdowns

Top tacklers

- DET – Kyle Vanden Bosch – 10 tackles, 1 assist
- CHI – Lance Briggs – 9 tackles, 1 assist, 1 forced fumble

The Lions opened the season at Soldier Field against their NFC North foe the Chicago Bears. The Bears took an early lead in the first quarter with a 20-yard field goal by kicker Robbie Gould. The Lions answered with two consecutive touchdowns by rookie running back Jahvid Best: first a 7-yard run, and later in the second quarter with a 4-yard run. The Bears responded with an 89-yard catch and run touchdown by Matt Forté and later with a 31-yard field goal from Gould just before halftime. The only score of the second half was a 28-yard touchdown catch by Forté (with a failed 2-point conversion), giving the Bears a late lead. Late in the game, quarterback Shaun Hill completed what would have been the game-winning 25-yard touchdown pass to wide receiver Calvin Johnson. A touchdown was initially signaled, but the officials conferred and ruled that Johnson did not "complete the catch during the process of the catch." The play was reviewed and the ruling on the field of an incomplete pass stood.

With the loss, the Lions started their season 0–1.

=== Week 2: vs. Philadelphia Eagles ===
Week 2: Philadelphia Eagles at Detroit Lions – Game summary

Quarter	1	2	3	4	Total
Eagles	7	14	7	7	35
Lions	7	10	0	15	32

at Ford Field, Detroit, Michigan

- Date: September 19
- Game time: 1:00 pm EDT
- Game weather: None (dome stadium)
- Game attendance: 56,688
- Referee: Clete Blakeman
- TV announcers (Fox): Sam Rosen, Tim Ryan and Chris Myers
- Recap
  Gamebook

Game information

First quarter

- PHI – DeSean Jackson 45-yard pass from Michael Vick (David Akers kick), Eagles 7–0, Drive: 4 plays, 80 yards, 2:29.
- DET – Jahvid Best 14-yard run (Jason Hanson kick), Tied 7–7, Drive: 6 plays, 76 yards, 3:00.

Second quarter

- DET – Jacob Janson 49-yard field goal, Lions 10–7, Drive: 7 plays, 12 yards, 1:54.
- DET – Jahvid Best 75-yard pass from Shaun Hill (Jason Hanson kick), Lions 17–7, Drive: 3 plays, 80 yards, 1:14.
- PHI – LeSean McCoy 14-yard run (David Akers kick), Lions 17–14, Drive: 11 plays, 74 yards, 4:23.
- PHI – Jeremy Maclin 9-yard pass from Michael Vick (David Akers kick), Eagles 21–17, Drive: 7 plays, 89 yards, 0:59.

Third quarter

- PHI – LeSean McCoy 4-yard run (David Akers kick), Eagles 28–17, Drive: 9 plays, 65 yards, 4:38.

Fourth quarter

- PHI – LeSean McCoy 46-yard run (David Akers kick), Eagles 35–17, Drive: 5 plays, 58 yards, 1:32.
- DET – Jahvid Best 2-yard run (Jason Hanson kick), Eagles 35–24, Drive: 7 plays, 80 yards, 2:04.
- DET – Calvin Johnson 19-yard pass from Shaun Hill (Shaun Hill – Calvin Johnson pass), Eagles 35–32, Drive: 6 plays, 55 yards, 1:11.

Top passers

- PHI – Michael Vick – 21/34, 284 yards, 2 touchdowns
- DET – Shaun Hill – 25/45, 335 yards, 2 touchdowns, 2 interceptions

Top rushers

- PHI – LeSean McCoy – 16 rushes, 120 yards, 3 touchdowns
- DET – Jahvid Best – 17 rushes, 78 yards, 2 touchdowns

Top receivers

- PHI – DeSean Jackson – 4 receptions, 135 yards, 1 touchdown
- DET – Jahvid Best – 9 receptions, 154 yards, 1 touchdown

Top tacklers

- PHI – Omar Gaither – 12 tackles
- DET – Ndamukong Suh – 6 tackles, 2 assists, 1 sack

For their home opener, the Lions hosted the Philadelphia Eagles. The Eagles scored first midway through the first quarter with a 45-yard touchdown catch by DeSean Jackson. The Lions responded a few minutes later with a 14-yard touchdown run by Jahvid Best. Later in the second quarter the Lions broke the tie with a 49-yard Jason Hanson field goal. They increased their lead with a 75-yard touchdown catch by Jahvid Best. The Eagles answered with 4 consecutive touchdowns. First a 14-yard run by LeSean McCoy. Next a 9-yard run by Jeremy Maclin just before halftime. Midway through the third, Philadelphia added to their lead with 2 touchdowns by LeSean McCoy. First a 4-yard run, then in the 4th quarter one for 46 yards. The Lions then attempted a comeback with 2 consecutive touchdowns late in the game. First a 2-yard touchdown run by Jahvid Best. Then a 19-yard catch by Calvin Johnson with a 2-point conversion tacked on. The Lions completed an onside kick but turned the ball over on downs.

With the loss, the Lions fell to 0–2 for the 3rd straight season.

=== Week 3: at Minnesota Vikings ===
Week 3: Detroit Lions at Minnesota Vikings – Game summary

Quarter	1	2	3	4	Total
Lions	7	3	0	0	10
Vikings	7	7	10	0	24

at Mall of America Field at Hubert H. Humphrey Metrodome, Minneapolis, Minnesota

- Date: September 26
- Game time: 1:00 pm EDT
- Game weather: None (domed stadium)
- Game attendance: 63,377
- Referee: Ed Hochuli
- TV announcers (Fox): Kenny Albert, Daryl Johnston and Tony Siragusa
- Recap
  Gamebook

Game information

First quarter

- DET – Tony Scheffler 5-yard pass from Shaun Hill (Jason Hanson kick), Lions 7–0, Drive: 3 plays, 12 yards, 1:13.
- MIN – Percy Harvin 24-yard pass from Brett Favre (Ryan Longwell kick), Tied 7–7, Drive: 1 plays, 24 yards, 0:05.

Second quarter

- MIN – Adrian Peterson 6-yard run (Ryan Longwell kick), Vikings 14–7, Drive: 10 plays, 66 yards, 5:58.
- DET – Jason Hanson 33-yard field goal, Vikings 14–10, Drive: 5 plays, 36 yards, 0:54.

Third quarter

- MIN – Ryan Longwell 31-yard field goal, Vikings 21–10, Drive: 13 plays, 59 yards, 7:13.
- MIN – Adrian Peterson 80-yard run (Ryan Longwell kick), Vikings 28–10, Drive: 1 plays, 80 yards, 0:13.

Fourth quarter

- No scoring plays

Top passers

- DET – Shaun Hill – 29/43, 237 yards, 1 touchdown, 2 interceptions
- MIN – Brett Favre – 23/34, 201 yards, 1 touchdown, 2 interceptions

Top rushers

- DET – Jahvid Best – 7 rushes, 26 yards
- MIN – Adrian Peterson – 23 rushes, 160 yards, 2 touchdowns

Top receivers

- DET – Tony Scheffler – 7 receptions, 60 yards, 1 touchdown
- MIN – Percy Harvin – 6 receptions, 62 yards, 1 touchdown

Top tacklers

- DET – C.C. Brown – 5 tackles, 2 assists
- MIN – Chad Greenway – 9 tackles

In week 3, the Lions traveled to Minneapolis to take on division rivals the Minnesota Vikings. The Lions took an early lead with a 5-yard touchdown catch by Tony Scheffler. The Vikings tied it up 24-yard catch by Percy Harvin. They then took the lead in the second quarter with a 6-yard run by Adrian Peterson. The Lions responded just before halftime with a 33-yard field goal. Midway through the third quarter the Vikings added to their lead with a 31-yard field goal by Ryan Longwell. A few minutes later they sealed their win with an 80-yard run by Adrian Peterson.

With the loss, the Lions fell to 0–3.

=== Week 4: at Green Bay Packers ===
Week 4: Detroit Lions at Green Bay Packers – Game summary

Quarter	1	2	3	4	Total
Lions	0	14	6	6	26
Packers	7	14	7	0	28

at Lambeau Field, Green Bay, Wisconsin

- Date: October 3
- Game time: 1:00 pm EDT
- Game weather: 52 °F (11.1 °C), mostly sunny
- Game attendance: 70,729
- Referee: Mike Carey
- TV announcers (Fox): Thom Brennaman, Brian Billick and Charissa Thompson
- Recap
  Gamebook

Game information

First quarter

- GB – Donald Driver 29-yard pass from Aaron Rodgers (Mason Crosby kick), Packers 7–0, Drive: 4 plays, 55 yards, 2:20.

Second quarter

- DET – Calvin Johnson 23-yard pass from Shaun Hill (Jason Hanson kick), Tied 7–7, Drive: 8 plays, 63 yards, 4:15.
- GB – Jermichael Finley 13-yard pass from Aaron Rodgers (Mason Crosby kick), Packers 14–7, Drive: 3 plays, 12 yards, 1:34.
- GB – Greg Jennings 17-yard pass from Aaron Rodgers (Mason Crosby kick), Packers 21–7, Drive: 4 plays, 68 yards, 1:32.
- DET – Calvin Johnson 21-yard pass from Shaun Hill (Jason Hanson kick), Packers 21–14, Drive: 13 plays, 80 yards, 6:40.

Third quarter

- GB – Charles Woodson 48-yard interception return (Mason Crosby kick), Packers 28–14.
- DET – Jason Hanson 39-yard field goal, Packers 28–17, Drive: 12 plays, 48 yards, 5:08.
- DET – Jason Hanson 52-yard field goal, Packers 28–20, Drive: 9 plays, 59 yards, 4:21.

Fourth quarter

- DET – Jason Hanson 49-yard field goal, Packers 28–23, Drive: 6 plays, 27 yards, 1:33.
- DET – Jason Hanson 24-yard field goal, Packers 28–26, Drive: 6 plays, 12 yards, 1:39.

Top passers

- DET – Shaun Hill – 34/54, 331 yards, 2 touchdowns, 2 interceptions
- GB – Aaron Rodgers – 12/17, 181 yards, 3 touchdowns, 2 interceptions

Top rushers

- DET – Shaun Hill – 4 rushes, 53 yards
- GB – John Kuhn – 9 rushes, 39 yards

Top receivers

- DET – Brandon Pettigrew – 8 receptions, 91 yards
- GB – Donald Driver – 3 receptions, 89 yards, 1 touchdown

Top tacklers

- DET – Louis Delmas – 5 tackles, 1 assist, 1 sack
- GB – Charles Woodson – 11 tackles, 2 assists, 1 interception

In week 4, the Lions traveled across Lake Michigan to Green Bay, Wisconsin to play division rivals the Green Bay Packers. The Packers started the scoring in the first quarter with a 29-yard TD catch by Donald Driver from Aaron Rodgers. The Lions tied it up in the second quarter with a 23-yard TD catch by Calvin Johnson. The Packers took the lead with a 13-yard catch by Jermichael Finley. They added to their lead 17-yard catch by Greg Jennings. The Lions responded just before halftime with a 21-yard catch by Calvin Johnson. Just after the break, the Packers' Charles Woodson returned an interception for a touchdown. The Lions attempted a comeback with 4 consecutive field goals: from 39 yards and 52 yards in the 3rd quarter, and later from 49 yards and 24 yards in the 4th. With the loss, not only did the Lions fall to 0–4, but it also marked their 19th consecutive loss in Wisconsin.

=== Week 5: vs. St. Louis Rams ===
Week 5: St. Louis Rams at Detroit Lions – Game summary

Quarter	1	2	3	4	Total
Rams	3	3	0	0	6
Lions	3	21	7	13	44

at Ford Field, Detroit, Michigan

- Date: October 10
- Game time: 1:00 pm EDT
- Game weather: None (domed stadium)
- Game attendance: 55,714
- Referee: Bill Leavy
- TV announcers (Fox): Ron Pitts & John Lynch
- Recap
  Gamebook

Game information

First quarter

- DET – Jason Hanson 30-yard field goal, Lions 3–0, Drive: 5 plays, 29 yards, 1:16.
- STL – Josh Brown 28-yard field goal, Tied 3–3, Drive: 12 plays, 62 yards, 6:20.

Second quarter

- DET – Stefan Logan 105-yard kickoff return (Jason Hanson kick), Lions 10–3, Drive: 0 plays, 0 yards, 0:14.
- DET – Calvin Johnson 1-yard pass from Shaun Hill (Jason Hanson kick), Lions 17–3, Drive: 13 plays, 81 yards, 7:16.
- STL – Josh Brown 28-yard field goal, Lions 17–6, Drive: 12 plays, 68 yards, 4:37.
- DET – Brandon Pettigrew 3-yard pass from Shaun Hill (Jason Hanson kick), Lions 24–6, Drive: 12 plays, 80 yards, 1:27.

Third quarter

- DET – Nate Burleson 26-yard pass from Shaun Hill (Jason Hanson kick), Lions 31–6, Drive: 4 plays, 41 yards, 1:53.

Fourth quarter

- DET – Jason Hanson 48-yard field goal, Lions 34–6, Drive: 10 plays, 52 yards, 4:23.
- DET – Jason Hanson 47-yard field goal, Lions 37–6, Drive: 4 plays, 2 yards, 1:31.
- DET – Alphonso Smith 42-yard interception return (Jason Hanson kick), Lions 44–6.

Top passers

- STL – Sam Bradford – 23/45, 215 yards, 2 interceptions
- DET – Shaun Hill – 21/32, 227 yards, 3 touchdowns

Top rushers

- STL – Steven Jackson – 25 rushes, 114 yards
- DET – Jahvid Best – 17 rushes, 59 yards

Top receivers

- STL – Danny Amendola – 12 receptions, 95 yards
- DET – Nate Burleson – 4 receptions, 56 yards, 1 touchdown

Top tacklers

- STL – James Laurinaitis – 4 tackles, 3 assists
- DET – Julian Peterson – 7 tackles, 4 assists, 1 sack

In week 5 the Lions hosted the St. Louis Rams. The Lions started the scoring early with a 30-yard Jason Hanson field goal. The Rams tied it up at the end of the first quarter with a 28-yard field goal by Josh Brown. To start the second quarter, the Lions took the lead with a 105-yard kickoff return by Stefan Logan, the longest touchdown run in the NFL this season. The Lions added to their lead a few minutes later with a 1-yard TD catch by Calvin Johnson. The Rams kicked another 28-yard field goal a few minutes later. The Lions made it 24–6 just before halftime with a 3-yard TD catch by Brandon Pettigrew. The Lions' defense shut out the Rams in the second half. The only score of the third quarter was a 26-yard TD catch by Nate Burleson. In the fourth quarter the Lions kicked 2 field goals: from 48 then from 47. The Lions capped off their victory with a 42-yard interception return TD by Alphonso Smith. With the win, not only did the Lions improve to 1–4, but it was their largest margin of victory since 1995 and their first win since November 22, 2009.

=== Week 6: at New York Giants ===
Week 6: Detroit Lions at New York Giants – Game summary

Quarter	1	2	3	4	Total
Lions	7	3	0	10	20
Giants	7	7	7	7	28

at New Meadowlands Stadium, East Rutherford, New Jersey

- Date: October 17
- Game time: 1:00 pm EDT
- Game weather: 63 °F or 17.2 °C (Sunny)
- Game attendance: 78,341
- Referee: Jeff Triplette
- TV announcers (Fox): Dick Stockton, Charles Davis & Laura Okmin
- Recap
  Game Book

Game information

First quarter

- DET – Nate Burleson 14-yard pass from Shaun Hill (Jason Hanson kick), Lions 7–0, Drive: 9 plays, 43 yards, 4:00.
- NYG – Brandon Jacobs 4-yard run (Shayne Graham kick), Tied 7–7, Drive: 5 plays, 40 yards, 2:23.

Second quarter

- NYG – Mario Manningham 33-yard pass from Eli Manning (Shayne Graham kick), Giants 14–7, Drive: 11 plays, 93 yards, 6:42.
- DET – Jason Hanson 50-yard field goal, Giants 14–10, Drive: 14 plays, 48 yards, 3:14.

Third quarter

- NYG – Travis Beckum 1-yard pass from Eli Manning (Shayne Graham kick), Giants 21–10, Drive: 8 plays, 57 yards, 4:25.

Fourth quarter

- DET – Calvin Johnson 87-yard pass from Drew Stanton (Jason Hanson kick), Giants 21–17, Drive: 3 plays, 87 yards, 1:36.
- NYG – Brandon Jacobs 6-yard run (Shayne Graham kick), Giants 28–17, Drive: 3 plays, 58 yards, 1:37.
- DET – Jason Hanson 50-yard field goal, Giants 28–20, Drive: 4 plays, 8 yards, 0:34.

Top passers

- DET – Drew Stanton – 19/34, 222 yards, 1 touchdown, 1 interception
- NYG – Eli Manning – 20/30, 177 yards, 2 touchdowns

Top rushers

- DET – Drew Stanton – 3 rushes, 30 yards
- NYG – Ahmad Bradshaw – 19 rushes, 133 yards

Top receivers

- DET – Calvin Johnson – 5 receptions, 146 yards, 1 touchdown
- NYG – Steve Smith – 6 receptions, 70 yards

Top tacklers

- DET – Ashlee Palmer – 9 tackles, 4 assists
- NYG – Deon Grant – 7 tackles, 3 assist, 1 forced fumble

In week 6, the Lions traveled east to East Rutherford, New Jersey to take on the New York Giants. The Lions took an early lead midway through the first quarter with a 14-yard TD catch by Nate Burleson. The Giants responded at the end of the 1st quarter with a 4-yard TD run by Brandon Jacobs. In the second quarter, the Giants increased their lead with a 33-yard TD catch by Mario Manningham. The Lions responded with a 50-yard field goal just before halftime. Shaun Hill was also injured before halftime and left the game with a broken left forearm. Drew Stanton took over the QB role for the remainder of the game. The only score of the 3rd quarter was a 1-yard TD catch by Travis Beckum of the Giants. The Lions attempted a comeback when Calvin Johnson caught an 87-yard TD. The Giants responded with a 6-yard TD catch by Brandon Jacobs. The Lions ended the scoring with another 50-yard field goal. With the loss, not only did the Lions fall to 1–5 into their bye week, but it increased their road losing streak to 24, tying the NFL record that the team set from 2001 to 2003.

=== Week 8: vs. Washington Redskins ===
Week 8: Washington Redskins at Detroit Lions – Game summary

Quarter	1	2	3	4	Total
Redskins	0	13	0	12	25
Lions	0	7	7	23	37

at Ford Field, Detroit, Michigan

- Date: October 31
- Game time: 1:00 pm EDT
- Game weather: None (dome stadium)
- Game attendance: 42,329
- Referee: Jerome Boger
- TV announcers (Fox): Sam Rosen, Tim Ryan, & Charissa Thompson (blacked out locally)
- Recap
  Gamebook

Game information

First quarter

- No scoring plays

Second quarter

- DET – Calvin Johnson 13-yard pass from Matthew Stafford (Jason Hanson kick), Lions 7–0, Drive: 3 plays, 19 yards, 0:49.
- WAS – Ryan Torain 6-yard pass from Donovan McNabb (Graham Gano kick), Tied 7–7, Drive: 3 plays, 42 yards, 1:19.
- WAS – Graham Gano 38-yard field goal, Redskins 10–7, Drive: 8 plays, 69 yards, 3:28.
- WAS – Graham Gano 46-yard field goal, Redskins 13–7, Drive: 3 plays, 21 yards, 0:16.

Third quarter

- DET – Brandon Pettigrew 2-yard pass from Matthew Stafford (Jason Hanson kick), Lions 14–13, Drive: 9 plays, 52 yards, 4:58.

Fourth quarter

- WAS – Keiland Williams 5-yard run (pass failed), Redskins 19–14, Drive: 3 plays, 46 yards, 1:20.
- DET – Calvin Johnson 7-yard pass from Matthew Stafford (pass failed), Lions 20–19, Drive: 6 plays, 47 yards, 2:54.
- WAS – Brandon Banks 96-yard kickoff return (pass failed), Redskins 25–20, Drive: 0 plays, 0 yards, 0:16.
- DET – Calvin Johnson 10-yard pass from Matthew Stafford (Matthew Stafford – Bryant Johnson pass), Lions 28–25, Drive: 7 plays, 37 yards, 1:20.
- DET – Jason Hanson 32-yard field goal, Lions 31–25, Drive: 4 plays, 6 yards, 0:20.
- DET – Ndamukong Suh 17-yard fumble return (pass failed), Lions 37–25.

Top passers

- WAS – Donovan McNabb – 17/30, 210 yards, 1 touchdown
- DET – Matthew Stafford – 26/45, 212 yards, 4 touchdowns, 1 interception

Top rushers

- WAS – Donovan McNabb – 4 rushes, 45 yards
- DET – Kevin Smith – 12 rushes, 51 yards

Top receivers

- WAS – Anthony Armstrong – 3 receptions, 92 yards
- DET – Calvin Johnson – 9 receptions, 101 yards, 3 touchdowns

Top tacklers

- WAS – Rocky McIntosh – 7 tackles, 2 assists
- DET – Kyle Vanden Bosch – 5 tackles, 1 assist, 2.0 sack, 1 forced fumble

In week 8, the Lions hosted a Halloween afternoon contest against the Washington Redskins. Neither team scored in the 1st quarter. The Lions took an early lead in the second quarter with a 13-yard TD catch by Calvin Johnson. The Redskins tied it up with a 6-yard TD catch by Ryan Torain. Washington's Graham Gano kicked 2 field goals just before halftime, from 38 and 46 yards out. The only score of the 3rd quarter was a 2-yard TD catch by Brandon Pettigrew of the Lions. The Redskins took the lead in the 4th quarter with a 5-yard TD run by Keiland Williams; they went for a 2-point conversion and failed, however. The Lions took the lead back with a 7-yard catch by Calvin Johnson; they also failed to complete a 2-point conversion. The Redskins responded with a 96-yard kickoff return for a TD by Brandon Banks; they again failed to complete a 2-point conversion. The Lions retook the lead with a 10-yard TD catch by Calvin Johnson, and completed a 2-point conversion. The Lions added to their lead a few minutes later with a 32-yard field goal by Jason Hanson. The Lions sealed their win with a fumble recovery by Ndamukong Suh which he ran back 17 yards for a touchdown, but the 2-point conversion failed. With the win, not only did the Lions improve to 2–5, but it was the first time since 2007 that the team has won back-to-back home games.

Curiously, this was the Lions' second consecutive blacked-out home game against the Redskins. The Lions had won the previous season's meeting as well.

=== Week 9: vs. New York Jets ===
Week 9: New York Jets at Detroit Lions – Game summary

Quarter	1	2	3	4	OT	Total
Jets	0	10	0	10	3	23
Lions	7	0	6	7	0	20

at Ford Field, Detroit, Michigan

- Date: November 7
- Game time: 1:00 pm EST
- Game weather: None (dome stadium)
- Game attendance: 57,799
- Referee: Alberto Riveron
- TV announcers (CBS): Gus Johnson and Steve Tasker
- Recap
  Gamebook

Game information

First quarter

- DET – Brandon Pettigrew 10-yard pass from Matthew Stafford (Jason Hanson kick), Lions 7–0, Drive: 11 plays, 80 yards, 5:44.

Second quarter

- NYJ – Nick Folk 31-yard field goal, Lions 7–3, Drive: 9 plays, 74 yards, 3:57.
- NYJ – Braylon Edwards 74-yard pass from Mark Sanchez (Nick Folk kick), Jets 10–7, Drive: 3 plays, 75 yards, 0:48.

Third quarter

- DET – Matthew Stafford 1-yard run (Ndamukong Suh extra point no good, hit right upright) Lions 13–10, Drive: 4 plays, 1 yards, 2:03.

Fourth quarter

- DET – Nate Burleson 2-yard pass from Matthew Stafford (Jason Hanson kick), Lions 20–10, Drive: 9 plays, 90 yards, 3:17.
- NYJ – Mark Sanchez 1-yard run (Nick Folk kick), Lions 20–17, Drive: 6 plays, 56 yards, 1:40.
- NYJ – Nick Folk 36-yard field goal, Tied 20–20, Drive: 9 plays, 60 yards, 1:40.

Overtime

- NYJ – Nick Folk 30-yard field goal, Jets 23–20, Drive: 5 plays, 56 yards, 2:18.

Top passers

- NYJ – Mark Sanchez – 22/39, 336 yards, 1 touchdown, 1 interception
- DET – Matthew Stafford – 20/36, 240 yards, 2 touchdowns

Top rushers

- NYJ – LaDainian Tomlinson – 15 rushes, 55 yards
- DET – Jahvid Best – 16 rushes, 48 yards

Top receivers

- NYJ – Santonio Holmes – 5 receptions, 114 yards
- DET – Nate Burleson – 7 receptions, 113 yards, 1 touchdown

Top tacklers

- NYJ – Jim Leonhard – 7 tackles
- DET – DeAndre Levy – 9 tackles, 1 assist

In week 9, the Lions hosted an interconference duel against the New York Jets. The only score of the first quarter was a 10-yard TD catch by the Lions' Brandon Pettigrew. The Jets responded in the second quarter with a 31-yard field goal by Nick Folk and later a 74-yard TD catch by Braylon Edwards just before halftime. The only score of the third quarter was a 1-yard quarterback sneak TD by Matt Stafford of the Lions; however the extra point attempt by defensive lineman Ndamukong Suh (an emergency fill-in for injured kicker Jason Hanson, who got run into on the previous field goal attempt which gave them a fresh set of downs) was no good. Early in the fourth quarter, the Lions added to their lead with a Nate Burleson 2-yard TD catch. The Jets responded late in the quarter with a 1-yard TD quarterback sneak by Mark Sanchez. The Jets kicked a field goal to tie it up just before time expired, forcing overtime. The Jets won the toss and kicked a 30-yard field goal for the win as the Lions fell to 2–6.

=== Week 10: at Buffalo Bills ===
Week 10: Detroit Lions at Buffalo Bills – Game summary

Quarter	1	2	3	4	Total
Lions	0	3	0	9	12
Bills	0	7	7	0	14

at Ralph Wilson Stadium, Orchard Park, New York

- Date: November 14
- Game time: 1:00 pm EST
- Game weather: 52 °F or 11.1 °C (Mostly Cloudy/Rain)
- Game attendance: 56,721
- Referee: Walt Coleman
- TV announcers (Fox): Ron Pitts, John Lynch and Charissa Thompson
- Recap
  Gamebook

Game information

First quarter

Second quarter

- BUF – Fred Jackson 1-yard run (Rian Lindell kick), Bills 7–0, Drive: 5 plays, 57 yards, 2:07.
- DET – Dave Rayner 25-yard field goal, Billts 7–3, Drive: 7 plays, 23 yards, 0:39.

Third quarter

- BUF – Fred Jackson 16-yard pass from Ryan Fitzpatrick (Rian Lindel kick), Bills 14–3, Drive: 6 plays, 73 yards, 3:34.

Fourth quarter

- DET – Dave Rayner 45-yard field goal, Bills 14–6, Drive: 7 plays, 61 yards, 2:44.
- DET – Calvin Johnson 20-yard pass from Shaun Hill (pass failed), Bills 14–12, Drive: 15 plays, 88 yards, 3:31.

Top passers

- DET – Shaun Hill – 29/50, 323 yards, 1 touchdown, 1 interception
- BUF – Ryan Fitzpatrick – 12/24, 146 yards, 1 touchdown

Top rushers

- DET – Jahvid Best – 17 rushes, 35 yards
- BUF – Fred Jackson – 25 rushes, 133 yards, 1 touchdown

Top receivers

- DET – Calvin Johnson – 10 receptions, 128 yards, 1 touchdown
- BUF – Lee Evans – 2 receptions, 52 yards

Top tacklers

- DET – Julian Peterson – 5 tackles, 1 assist
- BUF – Paul Posluszny – 11 tackles, 2 assist

In week 10, the Lions traveled east to rainy Orchard Park, New York to take on the Buffalo Bills. Neither team scored in the first quarter. In the second quarter, the Bills got on the board first with a 1-yard run by Fred Jackson. The Lions responded just before halftime with a 25-yard field goal by newly signed kicker Dave Rayner. The only score of the third quarter was a 16-yard TD catch by Fred Jackson of the Bills. The Lions kicked a 45-yard field goal midway through the fourth. Late in the game, the Lions attempted a comeback with a 20-yard TD catch by Calvin Johnson. They went for a 2-point conversion for the tie but failed. With the loss not only did the Lions fall to 2–7, but it was their 25th consecutive road loss, setting a new league record.

=== Week 11: at Dallas Cowboys ===
Week 11: Detroit Lions at Dallas Cowboys – Game summary

Quarter	1	2	3	4	Total
Lions	0	10	9	0	19
Cowboys	7	0	14	14	35

at Cowboys Stadium, Arlington, Texas

- Game time: 1:00 pm EST (12:00 pm CST)
- Game weather: None (retractable roof closed)
- Game attendance: 81,261
- Referee: Carl Cheffers
- TV announcers (FOX): Kenny Albert, Daryl Johnston, and Tony Siragusa
- Recap
  Gamebook

Game information

First quarter

- DAL – Dez Bryant 1-yard pass from Jon Kitna (David Buehler kick), Cowboys 7–0, 'Drive: 13 plays, 98 yards, 7:16.

Second quarter

- DET – Dave Rayner 47-yard field goal, Cowboys 7–3, 'Drive: 11 plays, 51 yards, 5:20.
- DET – Nate Burleson 9-yard pass from Shaun Hill (Dave Rayner kick), Lions 10–7, 'Drive: 3 plays, 14 yards, 0:19.

Third quarter

- DET – Penalty on Leonard Davis enforced in endzone for a safety, Lions 12–7.
- DAL – Bryan McCann 97-yard punt return (David Buehler kick), Cowboys 14–12.
- DAL – Miles Austin 3-yard pass from Jon Kitna (David Buehler kick), Cowboys 21–12, 'Drive: 4 plays, 19 yards, 2:07.
- DET – Calvin Johnson 14-yard pass from Shaun Hill (Dave Rayner kick), Cowboys 21–19, 'Drive: 6 plays, 80 yards, 2:23.

Fourth quarter

- DAL – Miles Austin 4-yard pass from Jon Kitna (Dave Rayner kick), Cowboys 28–19, 'Drive: 16 plays, 71 yards, 7:55.
- DAL – Jon Kitna 29-yard run (David Buehler kick), Cowboys 35–19, 'Drive: 9 plays, 80 yards, 4:40.

Top passers

- DET – Shaun Hill – 32/47, 289 yards, 2 touchdowns, 1 interceptions
- DAL – Jon Kitna – 18/24, 147 yards, 3 touchdowns

Top rushers

- DET – Maurice Morris – 10 rushes, 31 yards
- DAL – Felix Jones – 11 rushes, 51 yards

Top receivers

- DET – Nate Burleson – 7 receptions, 97 yards, 1 touchdown
- DAL – Jason Witten – 4 receptions, 48 yards

Top tacklers

- DET – Ndamukong Suh – 5 tackles, 3 sacks, 0.5 sack
- DAL – Keith Brooking – 7 tackles, 4 assists

In week 11, the Lions traveled to Arlington, Texas to play the Dallas Cowboys. The only score of the first quarter was a 1-yard TD catch by Dez Bryant of the Cowboys. In the second quarter the Lions got on the board with a 47-yard field goal, and took the lead with a 9-yard TD catch by Nate Burleson. After halftime, Leonard Davis of the Cowboys committed an offensive holding penalty in his own end zone, giving the Lions a safety. The Cowboys took the lead though with a 97-yard punt return by Bryan McCann, and added to it with a 3-yard catch by Miles Austin. The Lions responded with a 14-yard catch by Calvin Johnson. In the 4th quarter, Miles Austin caught another TD, this time from 4 yards out. Later, Jon Kitna sealed the Cowboys win with a 29-yard TD run. With the loss, not only did the Lions fall to 2–8, but they added to their already record setting 26 game road losing streak.

=== Week 12: vs. New England Patriots (Thanksgiving Day game) ===
Week 12: New England Patriots at Detroit Lions – Game summary

Quarter	1	2	3	4	Total
Patriots	3	7	14	21	45
Lions	7	10	7	0	24

at Ford Field, Detroit, Michigan

- Date: November 25
- Game time: 12:30 pm EST
- Game weather: None (domed stadium)
- Game attendance: 60,965
- Referee: Ron Winter
- TV announcers (CBS): Jim Nantz & Phil Simms
- Recap
  Gamebook

Game information

First quarter

- NE – Shayne Graham 19-yard field goal, Patriots 3–0, Drive: 8 plays, 41 yards, 3:59.
- DET – Calvin Johnson 19-yard pass from Shaun Hill (Dave Rayner kick), Lions 7–3, Drive: 11 plays, 71 yards, 5:00.

Second quarter

- DET – Maurice Morris 1-yard run (Dave Rayner kick), Lions 14–3, Drive: 13 plays, 63 yards, 6:24.
- NE – BenJarvus Green-Ellis 15-yard run (Shayne Graham kick), Lions 14–10, Drive: 10 plays, 83 yards, 5:13.
- DET – Dave Rayner 44-yard field goal, Lions 17–10, Drive: 7 plays, 41 yards, 0:45.

Third quarter

- NE – Wes Welker 5-yard pass from Tom Brady (Shayne Graham kick), Tied 17–17, Drive: 4 plays, 26 yards, 2:08.
- DET – Maurice Morris 1-yard run (Dave Rayner kick), Lions 24–17, Drive: 9 plays, 58 yards, 4:08.
- NE – Deion Branch 79-yard pass from Tom Brady (Shayne Graham kick), Tied 24–24, Drive: 3 plays, 87 yards, 1:38.

Fourth quarter

- NE – Deion Branch 22-yard pass from Tom Brady (Shayne Graham kick), Patriots 31–24, Drive: 5 plays, 64 yards, 2:15.
- NE – Wes Welker 16-yard pass from Tom Brady (Shayne Graham kick), Patriots 38–24, Drive: 7 plays, 84 yards, 4:25.
- NE – BenJarvus Green-Ellis 1-yard run (Shayne Graham kick), Patriots 45–24, Drive: 4 plays, 12 yards, 2:29.

Top passers

- NE – Tom Brady – 21/27, 341 yards, 4 touchdowns
- DET – Shaun Hill – 27/46, 285 yards, 1 touchdown, 2 interceptions

Top rushers

- NE – BenJarvus Green-Ellis – 12 rushes, 59 yards, 2 touchdowns
- DET – Maurice Morris – 9 rushes, 55 yards, 2 touchdowns

Top receivers

- NE – Deion Branch – 3 receptions, 113 yards, 2 touchdowns
- DET – Calvin Johnson – 4 receptions, 81 yards, 1 touchdown

Top tacklers

- NE – Jerod Mayo – 8 tackles, 4 assists
- DET – Amari Spievey – 8 tackles, 2 assists

For their 71st annual Thanksgiving Day game, the Lions hosted the New England Patriots. In a rare occurrence, both teams wore the home versions of their throwback uniforms. The Patriots got on the board first with a 19-yard field goal by Shayne Graham. The Lions took the lead late in the first quarter with a 19-yard TD catch by Calvin Johnson. The Lions added to their lead in the 2nd quarter with a 1-yard run by Maurice Morris. The Patriots responded later in the quarter with a 15-yard run Benjarvus Green-Ellis. The Lions answered just before halftime with a 44-yard field goal.

Detroit area native Kid Rock performed for the halftime show.

The Patriots tied the game early in the 3rd quarter with a 5-yard catch by Wes Welker. The Lions responded a few minutes later with a 1-yard run by Maurice Morris. The Patriots then scored 4 unanswered touchdowns: a 79-yard catch by Deion Branch, then in the 4th quarter a 22-yard catch by the same, then a 16-yard catch by Wes Welker, and finally a 1-yard run by Benjarvus Green-Ellis.

With the loss, the Lions fell to 2–9 and were eliminated from playoff contention.

=== Week 13: vs. Chicago Bears ===
Week 13: Chicago Bears at Detroit Lions – Game summary

Quarter	1	2	3	4	Total
Bears	7	7	3	7	24
Lions	7	10	3	0	20

at Ford Field, Detroit, Michigan

- Date: December 5
- Game time: 12:00 pm CST
- Game weather: None (dome stadium)
- Game attendance: 58,119
- Referee: Ed Hochuli
- TV announcers (Fox): Sam Rosen, Tim Ryan and Jennifer Hammond
- Recap
  Gamebook

Game information

First quarter

- DET – Drew Stanton 3-yard run (Dave Rayner kick), Lions 7–0, Drive: 7 plays, 38 yards, 2:25.
- CHI – Chester Taylor 1-yard run (Robbie Gould kick), Tied 7–7, Drive: 13 plays, 76 yards, 6:33.

Second quarter

- DET – Dave Rayner 50-yard field goal, Lions 10–7, Drive: 10 plays, 39 yards, 5:32.
- CHI – Matt Forte 14-yard run (Robbie Gould kick), Bears 14–10, Drive: 8 plays, 83 yards, 4:51.
- DET – Calvin Johnson 46-yard pass from Drew Stanton (Dave Rayner kick), Lions 17–14, Drive: 2 plays, 91 yards, 0:19.

Third quarter

- DET – Dave Rayner 25-yard field goal, Lions 20–14, Drive: 4 plays, 2 yards, 1:32.
- CHI – Robbie Gould 54-yard field goal, Lions 20–17, Drive: 4 plays, −5 yards, 2:49.

Fourth quarter

- CHI – Brandon Manumaleuna 7-yard pass from Jay Cutler (Robbie Gould kick), Bears 24–20, Drive: 6 plays, 60 yards, 3:16.

Top passers

- CHI – Jay Cutler – 21/26, 234 yards, 1 touchdown
- DET – Drew Stanton – 16/24, 178 yards, 1 touchdown

Top rushers

- CHI – Matt Forte – 13 rushes, 64 yards, 1 touchdown
- DET – Jahvid Best – 9 rushes, 65 yards

Top receivers

- CHI – Earl Bennett – 7 receptions, 104 yards
- DET – Calvin Johnson – 3 receptions, 66 yards, 1 touchdown

Top tacklers

- CHI – Brian Urlacher – 10 tackles, 7 assists, 1 forced fumble
- DET – Louis Delmas – 5 tackles, 3 assists

In week 13, the Lions hosted a rematch with division rivals the Chicago Bears. The Lions took an early lead when Drew Stanton ran in a 3-yard touchdown. The Bears tied it up near the end of the 1st quarter with a 1-yard run by Chester Taylor. The Lions broke the tie with a 50-yard field goal. The Bears responded with a 14-yard TD run by Matt Forté. The Lions took the lead just before halftime with a 46-yard TD catch by Calvin Johnson. The Lions only points of the 2nd half was a 25-yard field goal by Dave Rayner early in the 3rd quarter. The Bears responded with a 54-yard field goal by Robbie Gould. The Bears took the lead midway through the 4th quarter with a 7-yard TD catch by Brandon Manumaleuna and held off the Lions offense for the remainder of the game for the win. With this loss, the Lions not only dropped to 2–10, but were also swept by the Bears for the third season in a row.

=== Week 14: vs. Green Bay Packers ===
Week 14: Green Bay Packers at Detroit Lions – Game summary

Quarter	1	2	3	4	Total
Packers	0	0	3	0	3
Lions	0	0	0	7	7

at Ford Field, Detroit, Michigan

- Date: December 12
- Game time: 1:00 pm EST
- Game weather: None (domed stadium)
- Game attendance: 57,659
- Referee: Gene Steratore
- TV announcers (Fox): Sam Rosen and Tim Ryan
- Recap
  Gamebook

Game information

First quarter

- No scoring plays

Second quarter

- No scoring plays

Third quarter

- GB – Mason Crosby 42-yard field goal, Packers 3–0, Drive: 8 plays, 48 yards, 4:05.

Fourth quarter

- DET – Will Heller 13-yard pass from Drew Stanton (Dave Rayner kick), Lions 7–3, Drive: 10 plays, 61 yards, 2:46.

Top passers

- GB – Matt Flynn – 15/26, 177 yards, 1 interception
- DET – Drew Stanton – 10/22, 117 yards, 1 touchdown, 2 interceptions

Top rushers

- GB – Aaron Rodgers – 2 rushes, 25 yards
- DET – Maurice Morris – 11 rushes, 51 yards

Top receivers

- GB – Andrew Quarless – 5 receptions, 62 yards
- DET – Calvin Johnson – 1 reception, 44 yards

Top tacklers

- GB – Desmond Bishop – 7 tackles, 3 assists
- DET – Landon Johnson – 5 tackles, 2 assists, 1 forced fumble

In week 14, the Lions hosted a rematch with division rivals the Green Bay Packers. Neither team scored in the first half. The only points of the 3rd quarter was a 42-yard field goal by Mason Crosby of the Packers. The only score of the 4th quarter was a 13-yard touchdown catch by Will Heller of the Lions to give them the win. With the win, not only did the Lions improve to 3–10, but it was the first time the team beat the Packers since 2005, snapping a 10-game losing streak. It was also their first division win since 2007, snapping a 19-game losing streak.

=== Week 15: at Tampa Bay Buccaneers ===
Week 15: Detroit Lions at Tampa Bay Buccaneers – Game summary

Quarter	1	2	3	4	OT	Total
Lions	7	3	7	3	3	23
Buccaneers	0	14	0	6	0	20

at Raymond James Stadium, Tampa, Florida

- Date: December 19
- Game time: 1:00 pm EST
- Game weather: 54 °F or 12.2 °C (Cloudy)
- Game attendance: 47,692
- Referee: Terry McAulay
- TV announcers (Fox): Dick Stockton & Charles Davis
- Recap
  Gamebook

Game information

First quarter

- DET – Nate Burleson 10-yard pass from Drew Stanton (Dave Rayner kick), Lions 7–0, Drive: 7 plays, 68 yards, 3:50.

Second quarter

- TB – Mike Williams 24-yard pass from Josh Freeman (Connor Barth kick), Tied 7–7, Drive: 8 plays, 60 yards, 4:37.
- TB – LeGarrette Blount 39-yard run (Connor Barth kick), Buccaneers 14–7, Drive: 8 plays, 77 yards, 4:45.
- DET – Dave Rayner 41-yard field goal, Buccaneers 14–10, Drive: 10 plays, 61 yards, 2:46.

Third quarter

- DET – Maurice Morris 10-yard run (Dave Rayner kick), Lions 17–14, Drive: 9 plays, 58 yards, 4:44.

Fourth quarter

- TB – Connor Barth 30-yard field goal, Tied 17–17, Drive: 15 plays, 67 yards, 7:05.
- TB – Connor Barth 26-yard field goal, Buccaneers 20–17, Drive: 11 plays, 57 yards, 4:09.
- DET – Dave Rayner 28-yard field goal, Tied 20–20, Drive: 10 plays, 58 yards, 1:39.

Overtime

- DET – Dave Rayner 34-yard field goal, Lions 23–20, Drive: 9 plays, 63 yards, 5:09.

Top passers

- DET – Drew Stanton – 23/37, 252 yards, 1 touchdown
- TB – Josh Freeman – 21/32, 251 yards, 1 touchdown

Top rushers

- DET – Maurice Morris – 15 rushes, 109 yards, 1 touchdown
- TB – LeGarrette Blount – 15 rushes, 110 yards, 1 touchdown

Top receivers

- DET – Calvin Johnson – 10 receptions, 152 yards
- TB – Mike Williams – 6 receptions, 96 yards, 1 touchdown

Top tacklers

- DET – DeAndre Levy – 11 tackles
- TB – Ronde Barber – 9 tackles

In week 15, the Lions traveled south to Tampa, Florida to play the Tampa Bay Buccaneers. The Lions took an early lead in the 1st quarter with a 10-yard TD catch by Nate Burleson. Tampa Bay tied it up in the second quarter with a 24-yard TD catch by Mike Williams, and later took the lead with a 39-yard TD run by LeGarrette Blount. The Lions answered just before halftime with a 41-yard field goal. The only score of the 3rd quarter was a 10-yard TD run by Maurice Morris of the Lions. Tampa Bay had 2 field goals in the fourth quarter, from 30 then 26 yards out. The Lions tied the game just before the end of regulation with a 28-yard field goal, taking it to overtime. In overtime the Lions got the ball first and kicked a 34-yard field goal for the win. With the win not only did the Lions improve to 4–10, but it broke their record 26-game road losing streak. It was also their first back to back wins since 2007.

=== Week 16: at Miami Dolphins ===
Week 16: Detroit Lions at Miami Dolphins – Game summary

Quarter	1	2	3	4	Total
Lions	3	7	7	17	34
Dolphins	3	14	7	3	27

at Sun Life Stadium, Miami Gardens, Florida

- Date: December 26
- Game time: 1:00 pm EST
- Game weather: 65 °F or 18.3 °C (Sunny and Windy)
- Game attendance: 66,731
- Referee: Tony Corrente
- TV announcers (Fox): Dick Stockton, Charles Davis & Laura Okmin
- Recap
  Gamebook

Game information

First quarter

- DET – Dave Rayner 39-yard field goal, Lions 3–0, Drive: 4 plays, −2 yards, 2:04.
- MIA – Dan Carpenter 40-yard field goal, Tied 3–3, Drive: 7 plays, 30 yards, 2:57.

Second quarter

- DET – Brandon Pettigrew 20-yard pass from Shaun Hill (Dave Rayner kick), 10–3 Lions, Drive: 6 plays, 80 yards, 3:13.
- MIA – Lousaka Polite 4-yard run (Dan Carpenter kick), Tied 10–10, Drive: 11 plays, 80 yds, 6:04.
- MIA – Davone Bess 13-yard pass from Chad Henne (Dan Carpenter kick), Dolphins 17–10, Drive: 4 plays, 40 yards, 1:12.

Third quarter

- DET – Maurice Morris 5-yard run (Dave Rayner kick), Tied 17–17, Drive: 14 plays, 86 yards, 6:28.
- MIA – Ronnie Brown 1-yard run (Dan Carpenter kick), Dolphins 24–17, Drive: 9 plays, 69 yards, 5:44.

Fourth quarter

- MIA – Dan Carpenter 28-yard field goal, 27–17 Dolphins, Drive: 9 plays, 52 yards, 4:53.
- DET – Jahvid Best 53-yard pass from Shaun Hill (Dave Rayner kick), 27–24 Dolphins, Drive: 1 plays, 53 yards, 0:00.
- DET – Dave Rayner 47-yard field goal, Tied 27–27, Drive: 4 plays, 7 yards, 0:57.
- DET – DeAndre Levy 30-yard interception return (Dave Rayner kick), 34–27 Lions, Drive: 3 plays, 2 yards, 0:33.

Top passers

- DET – Shaun Hill – 14/26, 222 yards, 2 touchdowns
- MIA – Chad Henne – 29/44, 278 yards, 1 touchdown, 2 interceptions

Top rushers

- DET – Jahvid Best – 6 rushes, 24 yards,
- MIA – Ricky Williams – 14 rushes, 71 yards,

Top receivers

- DET – Brandon Pettigrew – 4 receptions, 74 yards, 1 touchdown
- MIA – Brandon Marshall – 10 receptions, 102 yards

Top tacklers

- DET – Bobby Carpenter – 8 tackles, 1 assist
- MIA – Yeremiah Bell – 5 tackles, 1 assist

In week 16, the Lions flew back to Florida, this time to play the Miami Dolphins. The Lions took an early lead with a 39-yard field goal by Dave Rayner. The Dolphins tied it up with a 40-yard field goal by Dan Carpenter. In the second quarter, the Lions took the lead when Brandon Pettigrew caught a 20-yard touchdown pass. The Dolphins tied it up with a 4-yard rush by Lousaka Polite. Miami took the lead with a 13-yard TD catch by Davone Bess. After halftime, the Lions tied it back up with a 5-yard TD rush by Maurice Morris. The Dolphins responded with a 1-yard TD run by Ronnie Brown. Miami added to their lead with a 28-yard field goal. The Lions then scored 17 unanswered points. First Jahvid Best caught a 53-yard TD pass. Then Dave Rayner kicked a 47-yard field goal. They sealed their win when DeAndre Levy intercepted a Chad Henne pass and ran it back 30 yards for a touchdown. With the win not only did the Lions improve to 5–10, but it was their first back-to-back road victories since 2004, and first three-game winning streak since 2007.

=== Week 17: vs. Minnesota Vikings ===
Week 17: Minnesota Vikings at Detroit Lions – Game summary

Quarter	1	2	3	4	Total
Vikings	0	0	7	6	13
Lions	0	10	3	7	20

at Ford Field, Detroit, Michigan

- Date: January 2
- Game time: 1:00 pm EST
- Game weather: None (domed stadium)
- Game attendance: 57,013
- Referee: Walt Anderson
- TV announcers (Fox): Ron Pitts, John Lynch & Jennifer Hammond
- Recap
  Gamebook

Game information
First quarter
- No scoring plays

Second quarter

- DET – Dave Rayner 55-yard field goal, Lions 3–0, Drive: 8 plays, 32 yards, 4:18.
- DET – Nate Burleson 7-yard pass from Shaun Hill (Dave Rayner Kick), Lions 10–0, Drive: 15 plays, 94 yards, 4:39.

Third quarter

- DET – Dave Rayner 37-yard field goal, Lions 13–0, Drive: 11 plays, 47 yards, 5:02.
- MIN – Jared Allen 36-yard interception return, Lions 13–7, Drive: 1 plays, 37 yards, 0:35.

Fourth quarter

- MIN – Ryan Longwell 27-yard field goal, Lions 13–10, Drive: 12 plays, 52 yards, 7:17.
- DET – Maurice Morris 5-yard run (Dave Rayner kick), Lions 20–10, Drive: 8 plays, 77 yards, 2:36.
- MIN – Ryan Longwell 48-yard field goal, Lions 20–13, Drive: 13 plays, 58 yards, 3:41.

Top passers

- MIN – Joe Webb – 19/31, 133 yards, 0 touchdowns, 1 interception
- DET – Shaun Hill – 28/39, 258 yards, 1 touchdown, 1 interception

Top rushers

- MIN – Joe Webb – 5 rushes, 35 yards
- DET – Jahvid Best – 10 rushes, 34 yards

Top receivers

- MIN – Percy Harvin – 7 receptions, 57 yards
- DET – Nate Burleson – 6 receptions, 83 yards, 1 touchdown

Top tacklers

- MIN – Antoine Winfield – 9 tackles, 3 assists
- DET – DeAndre Levy – 4 tackles, 7 assists

To finish the season, the Lions hosted a rematch with division rivals the Minnesota Vikings. Neither team scored in the first quarter; the Vikings were shut out in the first half. The Lions got on the board midway through the second quarter with a 55-yard field goal by Dave Rayner. They added to their lead with a 7-yard touchdown catch by Nate Burleson just before halftime. After the break, Detroit kicked another field goal, this time from 37 yards out. The Vikings finally got on the board midway through the third quarter when Jared Allen intercepted a Shaun Hill pass and ran it back 36 yards for a touchdown. Early in the fourth quarter, Minnesota added more points with a 27-yard field goal by Ryan Longwell. The Lions responded a few minutes later with a 5-yard TD run by Maurice Morris. The Vikings kicked a 48-yard field goal late in the game, and attempted an onside kick to try to tie it but failed, giving Detroit the win. With the win not only did the Lions finish their season 6–10, but it became their first four-game winning streak since 1999 as they snapped the Vikings' 6-game winning streak against them and also became the first time the team has won back-to-back division rival games since 2007.

== Awards and records ==
Ndamukong Suh

- AP Defensive Rookie of the Year
- NFL Alumni Defensive Lineman of the Year
- Pepsi NFL Rookie of the Year
- Sporting News Rookie of the Year
- Pro Football Weekly Rookie of the Year
- PFWA Rookie of the Year
