= Chris Houston (American football) =

American football player (born 1984)

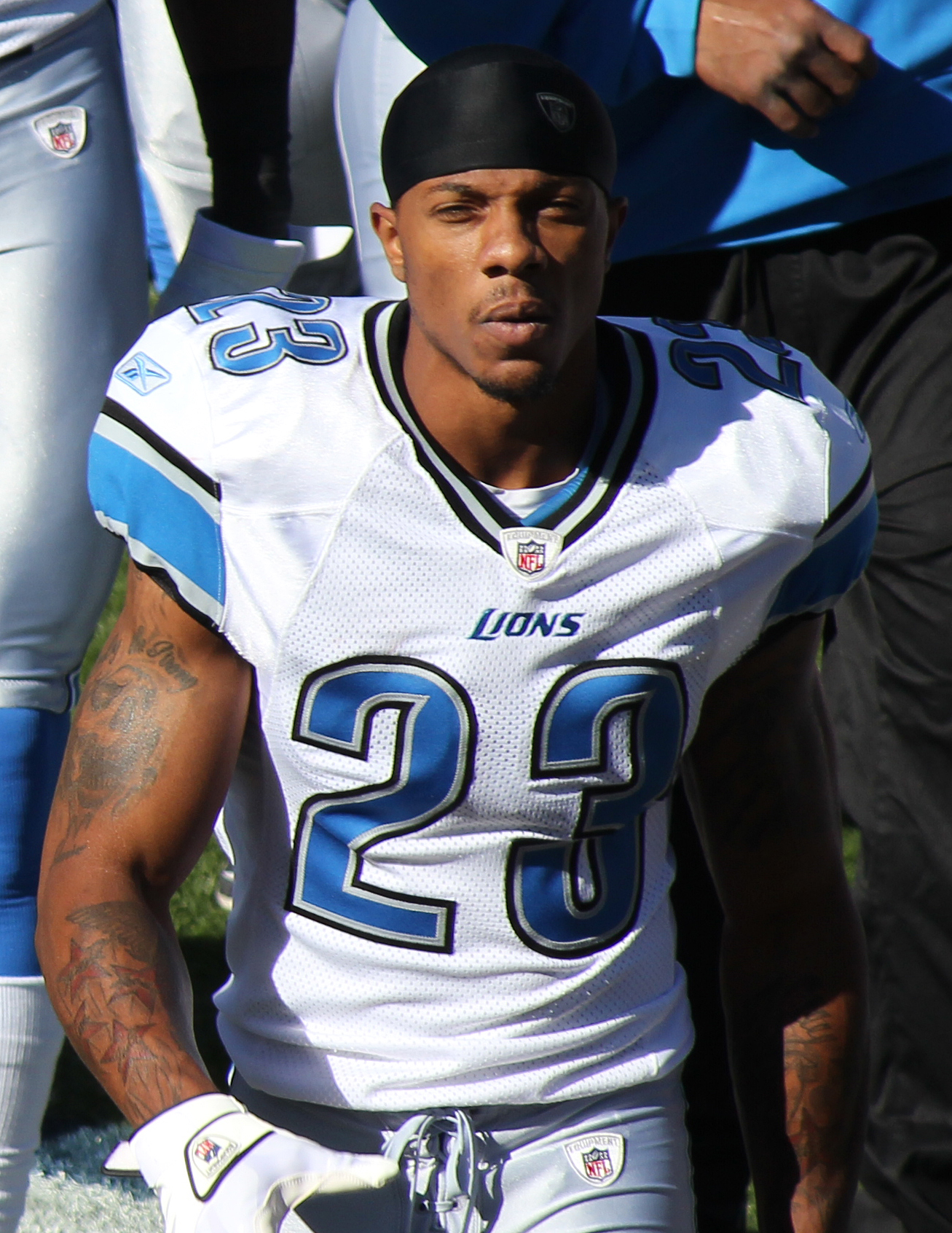
- Houston with the Detroit Lions in 2011

No. 23
- Position: Cornerback

Personal information
- Born: October 18, 1984 (age 42); Austin, Texas, U.S.
- Listed height: 5 ft 11 in (1.80 m)
- Listed weight: 185 lb (84 kg)

Career information
- High school: Johnson (Austin)
- College: Arkansas (2003–2006)
- NFL draft: 2007: 2nd round, 41st overall pick

Career history
- Atlanta Falcons (2007–2009); Detroit Lions (2010–2013); Carolina Panthers (2015)*
- * Offseason or practice squad member only

Awards and highlights
- NFL interception return yards leader (2011); Second-team All-SEC (2006)

Career NFL statistics
- Total tackles: 376
- Forced fumbles: 4
- Fumble recoveries: 1
- Pass deflections: 80
- Interceptions: 13
- Defensive touchdowns: 3
- Stats at Pro Football Reference

Christopher Don Houston (born October 18, 1984) is an American former professional football player who was a cornerback in the National Football League (NFL). He played college football for the Arkansas Razorbacks, and was selected by the Atlanta Falcons in the second round of the 2007 NFL draft. Houston was also a member of the Detroit Lions and Carolina Panthers.

== Early life ==
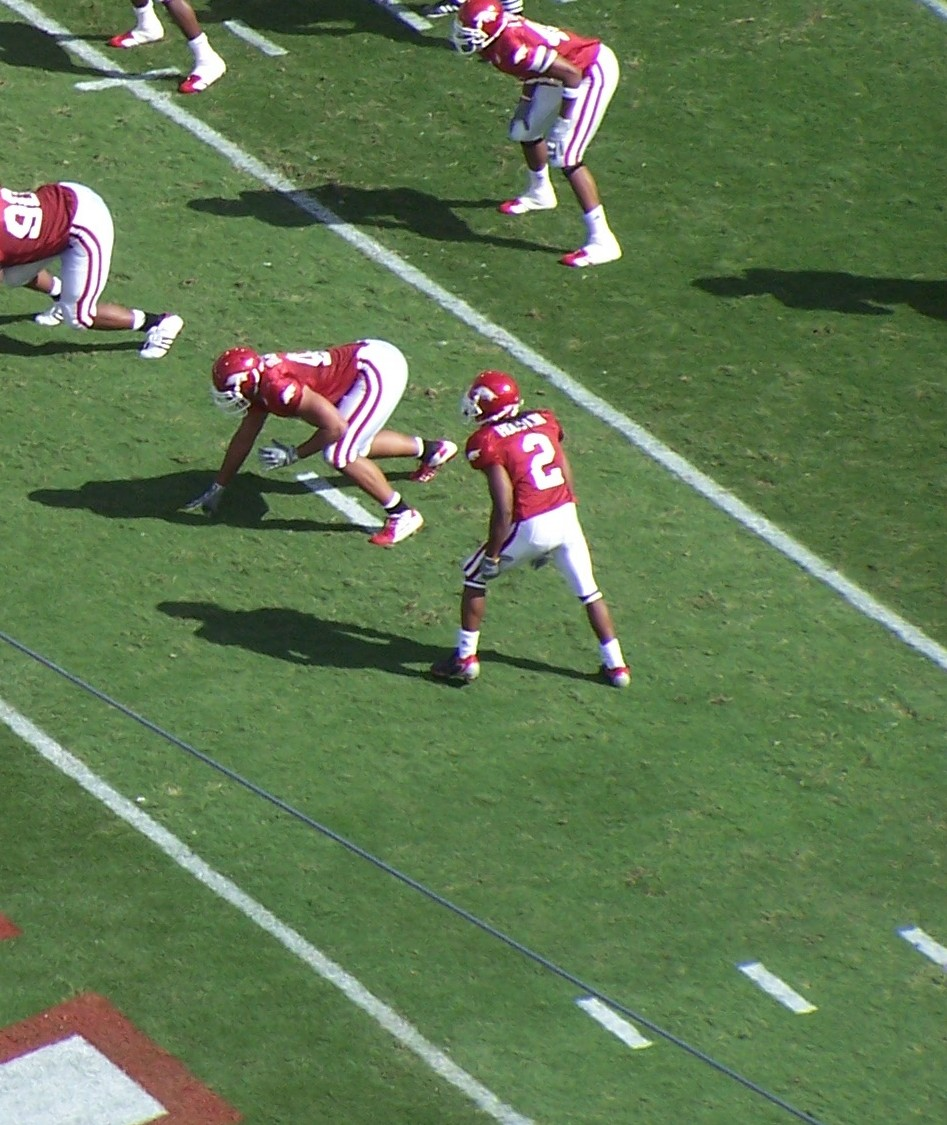
Houston with the Arkansas Razorbacks

Houston attended Mendez Middle School and LBJ High School in Austin, Texas, where he played running back and cornerback. During his senior year he rushed for 426 yards and six touchdowns, before moving exclusively to cornerback. He was also a shooting guard on the school's basketball team.

== College career ==
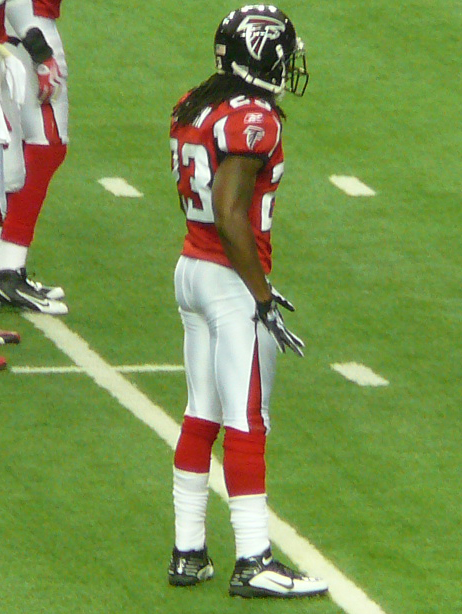
Houston during his tenure with the Falcons in 2009

Houston attended the University of Arkansas from 2003 to 2006. During his junior year in Fayetteville, he was a Pro Football Weekly All-American honorable mention and All-Southeastern Conference second-team selection by the league's coaches and Associated Press. He finished his college career with 89 tackles, three interceptions, three forced fumbles and a touchdown for the Razorbacks.

After his junior year, Houston decided to forgo his senior season with the Hogs and enter the 2007 NFL draft. His 27 reps at the NFL combine is the most by a participant weighing under-200 pounds; Houston was 185 pounds.

== Professional career ==
Pre-draft measurables
Height	Weight	40-yard dash	10-yard split	20-yard split	20-yard shuttle	Three-cone drill	Vertical jump	Broad jump	Bench press
5 ft 10 in (1.78 m)	185 lb (84 kg)	4.32 s	1.50 s	2.52 s	4.12 s	6.94 s	36 in (0.91 m)	10 ft 2 in (3.10 m)	27 reps
All values from NFL Combine

=== Atlanta Falcons ===
Houston was selected by the Atlanta Falcons in the second round of the 2007 NFL draft with the 41st overall pick. During his second season in 2008, against the Kansas City Chiefs, he had his first career interception and returned it for a touchdown. In three years with the Falcons he started 37 of 44 games, recording 166 tackles and three interceptions.

=== Detroit Lions ===
On March 8, 2010, Houston was traded to the Detroit Lions for a sixth-round pick in the 2010 NFL draft and a conditional seventh round pick in the 2011 NFL draft.

On June 13, 2014, the Lions released him due to injury concerns.

=== Carolina Panthers ===
Houston signed with the Carolina Panthers on June 15, 2015. He announced his retirement on August 4, 2015.

=== NFL statistics ===
Year	Team	GP	COMB	TOTAL	AST	SACK	FF	FR	FR YDS	INT	IR YDS	AVG IR	LNG	TD	PD
2007	ATL	16	58	57	1	0.0	1	0	0	0	0	0	0	0	9
2008	ATL	16	61	52	9	0.0	0	1	0	2	10	5	10	1	16
2009	ATL	12	47	39	8	0.0	0	0	0	1	4	4	4	0	9
2010	DET	15	56	50	6	0.0	1	0	0	1	0	0	0	0	12
2011	DET	14	54	44	10	0.0	0	0	0	5	225	45	100	2	14
2012	DET	14	56	44	12	0.0	2	0	0	2	2	1	2	0	11
2013	DET	12	44	38	6	0.0	0	0	0	2	34	17	30	0	9
Career		99	376	324	52	0.0	4	1	0	13	275	21	100	3	80
