= Tony Ugoh =

American football player (born 1983)

No. 67, 71, 70
- Position: Offensive tackle

Personal information
- Born: November 17, 1983 (age 42); Houston, Texas, U.S.
- Listed height: 6 ft 5 in (1.96 m)
- Listed weight: 301 lb (137 kg)

Career information
- High school: Westfield (Houston)
- College: Arkansas
- NFL draft: 2007: 2nd round, 42nd overall pick

Career history
- Indianapolis Colts (2007–2010); Detroit Lions (2010); Las Vegas Locomotives (2011); New York Giants (2011); Kansas City Chiefs (2012)*
- * Offseason or practice squad member only

Awards and highlights
- Super Bowl champion (XLVI); PFWA All-Rookie Team (2007); Third-team All-American (2006); First-team All-SEC (2006)

Career NFL statistics
- Games played: 40
- Games started: 28
- Stats at Pro Football Reference

Anthony Ike Ugoh Jr. (born November 17, 1983) is an American former professional football player who was an offensive tackle, who played in the National Football League (NFL). After playing college football for Arkansas, he was selected by the Indianapolis Colts in the second round of the 2007 NFL draft. He was also a member of the Detroit Lions, New York Giants, Kansas City Chiefs.

== Early life ==
Ugoh's parents are originally from Nigeria. He played football at Wells Middle School and at Westfield High School, both in Houston, Texas.

== College career ==
Ugoh played college football at the University of Arkansas. During his career he started 35 of 43 games and was chosen as a third-team All-America by the Associated Press and first-team All-Southeastern Conference as a senior. He also competed in discus and weight throw for the Razorback track team.

== Professional career ==
Pre-draft measurables
| Height | Weight | Arm length | Hand span | 40-yard dash | 10-yard split | 20-yard split | Vertical jump | Broad jump | Bench press |
|---|---|---|---|---|---|---|---|---|---|
| 6 ft 5 1/4 in (1.96 m) | 301 lb (137 kg) | 36 in (0.91 m) | 10 1/2 in (0.27 m) | 5.07 s | 1.75 s | 2.92 s | 32.5 in (0.83 m) | 9 ft 9 in (2.97 m) | 32 reps |
All values from NFL Combine

=== Indianapolis Colts ===
Ugoh was selected by the Indianapolis Colts in the second round of the 2007 NFL Draft with the 42nd overall pick. The Colts gave up a first-round pick in 2008 for the chance to move up in the 2007 draft and select him. He took over as the starting left tackle after Tarik Glenn retired during the offseason. The Colts waived Ugoh on September 8, 2010.

=== Detroit Lions ===
On December 10, 2010, the Lions worked Ugoh out and then signed him the next day to take the roster spot of linebacker Isaiah Ekejiuba, who was placed on injured reserve due to a knee injury. Ugoh's signing was seen as insurance if starting right tackle Gosder Cherilus was unable to play in the Lions' week 14 game against the Green Bay Packers due to a knee injury. He was released on August 14, 2011.

=== New York Giants ===
On December 7, 2011, the New York Giants signed Ugoh as a free agent, after placing Stacy Andrews on injured reserve. He became a free agent after the season.

=== Kansas City Chiefs ===
The Kansas City Chiefs signed Ugoh on July 26, 2012. He retired four days later.
