= Ashlee Palmer =

American football player (born 1986)

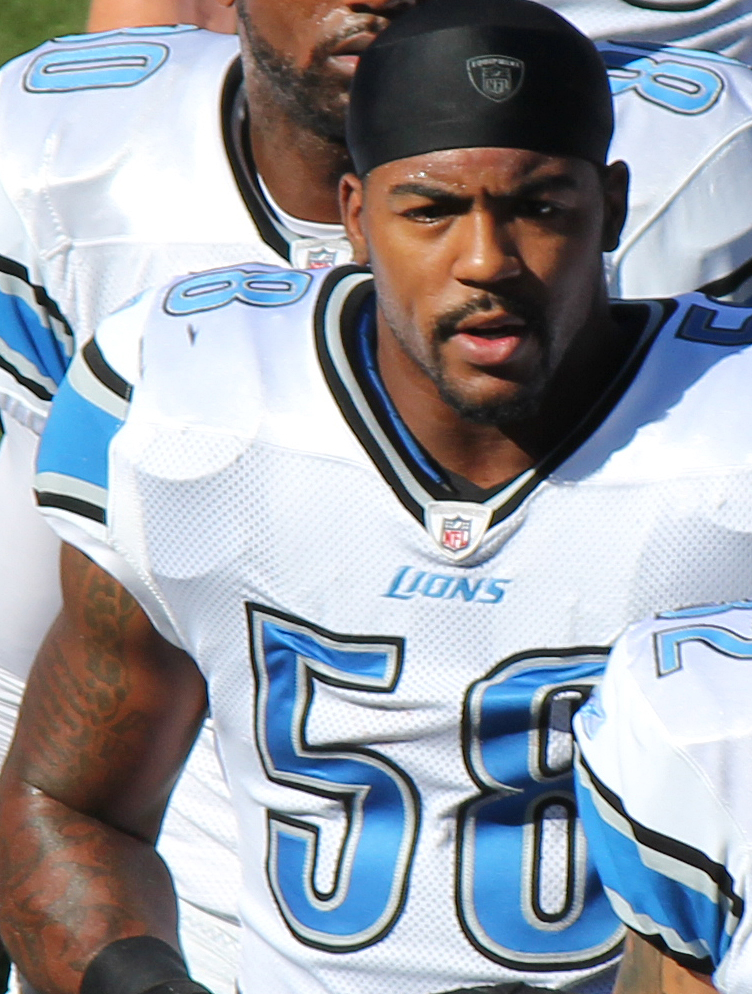
- Palmer with the Lions in 2011

No. 58, 59
- Position: Linebacker

Personal information
- Born: April 7, 1986 (age 40); Compton, California, U.S.
- Listed height: 6 ft 1 in (1.85 m)
- Listed weight: 223 lb (101 kg)

Career information
- High school: Lynwood (CA)
- College: Mississippi
- NFL draft: 2009: undrafted

Career history
- Buffalo Bills (2009); Detroit Lions (2010−2014); New York Giants (2015)*
- * Offseason or practice squad member only

Career NFL statistics
- Total tackles: 157
- Sacks: 2.5
- Forced fumbles: 3
- Fumble recoveries: 1
- Stats at Pro Football Reference

Ashlee Palmer (born April 7, 1986) is an American former professional football player who was a linebacker in the National Football League (NFL). He played college football for the Ole Miss Rebels and was signed by the Buffalo Bills as an undrafted free agent in 2009.

== College career ==
On May 26, 2012, Palmer was inducted into the Compton Community College Athletics Hall of Fame, under the category of Football.

== Professional career ==
=== Buffalo Bills ===
Palmer was signed by the Buffalo Bills as an undrafted free agent following the 2009 NFL draft on May 1, 2009. He was waived on February 16, 2010.

=== Detroit Lions ===
Palmer was claimed off waivers by the Detroit Lions on February 18, 2010.

He was not re-signed by the Lions after the conclusion of the 2014 NFL season.

=== New York Giants ===
Palmer signed with the New York Giants on August 24, 2015. On September 5, 2015, the Giants cut Palmer.

== NFL career statistics ==
Legend
**Bold**	Career high

=== Regular season ===
Year	Team	Games		Tackles					Interceptions					Fumbles			
Year	Team	GP	GS	Cmb	Solo	Ast	Sck	TFL	Int	Yds	TD	Lng	PD	FF	FR	Yds	TD
2009	BUF	14	2	24	19	5	0.0	1	0	0	0	0	1	0	0	0	0
2010	DET	**16**	5	**55**	**45**	**10**	1.0	4	0	0	0	0	1	**3**	0	0	0
2011	DET	**16**	0	8	8	0	0.0	0	0	0	0	0	0	0	0	0	0
2012	DET	**16**	2	25	23	2	0.0	2	0	0	0	0	0	0	0	0	0
2013	DET	**16**	**10**	33	24	9	0.0	**6**	0	0	0	0	1	0	**1**	0	0
2014	DET	**16**	5	12	8	4	**1.5**	1	0	0	0	0	**2**	0	0	0	0
		94	24	157	127	30	2.5	14	0	0	0	0	5	3	1	0	0

=== Playoffs ===
Year	Team	Games		Tackles					Interceptions					Fumbles			
Year	Team	GP	GS	Cmb	Solo	Ast	Sck	TFL	Int	Yds	TD	Lng	PD	FF	FR	Yds	TD
2011	DET	**1**	0	0	0	0	0.0	0	0	0	0	0	0	0	0	0	0
2014	DET	**1**	**1**	**2**	**2**	0	0.0	0	0	0	0	0	0	0	0	0	0
		2	1	2	2	0	0.0	0	0	0	0	0	0	0	0	0	0
