= Brandon Pettigrew =

American football player (born 1985)

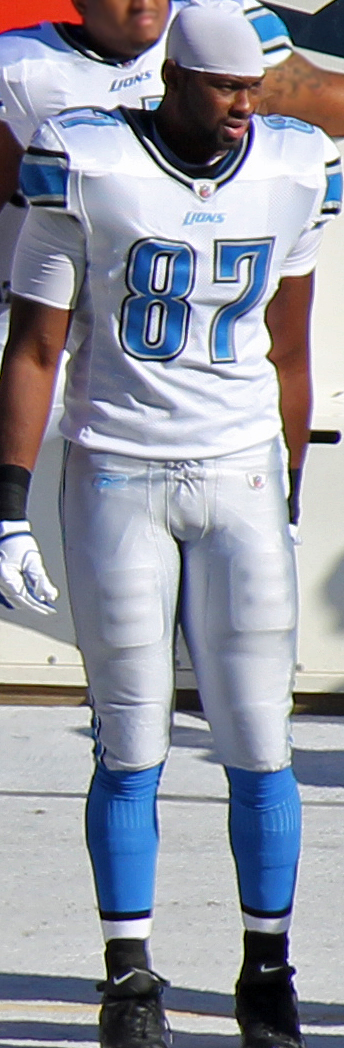
- Pettigrew with the Detroit Lions in 2011

No. 84, 87
- Position: Tight end

Personal information
- Born: February 23, 1985 (age 41); Tyler, Texas, U.S.
- Listed height: 6 ft 5 in (1.96 m)
- Listed weight: 278 lb (126 kg)

Career information
- High school: Tyler (TX) Lee
- College: Oklahoma State (2004–2008)
- NFL draft: 2009: 1st round, 20th overall pick

Career history
- Detroit Lions (2009–2016)

Awards and highlights
- PFWA NFL All-Rookie Team (2009); First-team All-Big 12 (2007)

Career NFL statistics
- Receptions: 301
- Receiving yards: 2,965
- Receiving average: 9.9
- Receiving touchdowns: 17
- Stats at Pro Football Reference

Brandon Dennard Pettigrew (born February 23, 1985) is an American former professional football player who was a tight end in the National Football League (NFL). He played college football for the Oklahoma State Cowboys. He was selected in the first round (20th overall) of the 2009 NFL draft by the Detroit Lions, and spent his entire 8-year career with the team.

== Early life ==
Brandon Pettigrew played high school football at Robert E. Lee High School in Tyler, Texas, where he was teammates with Matt Flynn, Justin Warren, and Ciron Black.

While at Robert E. Lee, Pettigrew played as a tight end and on defense. As a senior, he was named All-District and All-East Texas. He was also one of three players to be named to the All-State team. He chose to attend Oklahoma State University over Texas A&M, Texas Christian University (TCU), Southern Methodist University (SMU) and Arkansas.

== College career ==
Pettigrew played college football at Oklahoma State where he majored in economics.

As a freshman in 2005, he appeared in 11 games (nine starts). He recorded 11 receptions for 128 yards and one touchdown. In 2006, as a sophomore, he started all 13 games. He recorded 24 receptions for 310 yards and four touchdowns and was an All-Big 12 honorable mention. As a junior in 2007, he started all 13 games. He recorded 35 receptions for 540 yards and four touchdowns. He was named First-team All-Big 12 Football at Tight End in 2007. As a senior in 2008, he recorded 42 receptions for 472 yards. During his college career, he recorded 112 receptions for 1,450 yards and nine touchdowns.

=== College statistics ===
| Season | | | | Receiving | | | | |
| Year | Team | GP | GS | Rec | Yds | Avg | TD | Lng |
|---|---|---|---|---|---|---|---|---|
| 2005 | Okla. State | 11 | 9 | 11 | 128 | 11.6 | 1 | -- |
| 2006 | Okla. State | 13 | 13 | 24 | 340 | 12.9 | 4 | -- |
| 2007 | Okla. State | 13 | 13 | 35 | 540 | 15.4 | 4 | -- |
| 2008 | Okla. State | 10 | 10 | 42 | 472 | 11.2 | 0 | -- |
| Career | | 47 | 45 | 112 | 1,450 | 12.9 | 9 | -- |

== Professional career ==
Pre-draft measurables
| Height | Weight | Arm length | Hand span | 40-yard dash | 10-yard split | 20-yard split | 20-yard shuttle | Three-cone drill | Vertical jump | Broad jump | Bench press |
|---|---|---|---|---|---|---|---|---|---|---|---|
| 6 ft 5 3/8 in (1.97 m) | 263 lb (119 kg) | 34 7/8 in (0.89 m) | 10 3/4 in (0.27 m) | 4.86 s | 1.76 s | 2.87 s | 4.37 s | 7.12 s | 33.0 in (0.84 m) | 9 ft 10 in (3.00 m) | 22 reps |
All values from NFL Scouting Combine

Pettigrew was selected in the first round (20th overall) of the 2009 NFL draft by the Detroit Lions. The pick used to select Pettigrew was originally acquired by the Lions in a trade that sent Roy Williams to the Dallas Cowboys. On July 31, 2009, the Detroit Lions signed him to a five-year, $14.60 million contract with $9.4 million guaranteed and a signing bonus of $5.09 million.

On November 22 against the Cleveland Browns, Pettigrew caught six passes for 72 yards, including the game-winning touchdown. Pettigrew suffered a knee injury during the opening drive of the Lions' annual Thanksgiving Day game in Detroit. The next day, an MRI revealed he would require season-ending surgery. On December 1, 2009, Pettigrew was officially placed on injured reserve and missed the rest of the 2009 season. He finished the season with 30 receptions for 346 yards and two touchdowns.

In 2010, he recorded 71 receptions for 722 yards and four touchdowns. His 71 receptions and 722 receiving yards were both third best among tight ends. For the 2011 season, he recorded 83 receptions for 777 yards and five touchdowns. This set the record for the most receptions and yards in a season by a tight end in Lions history which would stand until Sam LaPorta's stellar 86-catch, 889-yard rookie season in 2023. In 2012, he recorded 59 receptions for 567 yards and three touchdowns. For the 2013 season, he recorded 41 receptions for 416 yards and two touchdowns.

On March 14, 2014, the Lions signed Pettigrew to a four-year, $12 million free-agent contract with $8 million guaranteed and a signing bonus of $4 million. For the 2014 season, he recorded ten receptions for 70 yards.

In a December 13, 2015, game against the St. Louis Rams, Pettigrew suffered a torn ACL. He was placed on injured reserve on December 15. For the 2015 season, he recorded seven receptions for 67 yards and one touchdown.

Pettigrew started out the 2016 on the PUP list to recover from his torn ACL the previous season. He was moved to the reserve/non-football injury list on December 6, 2016. Days later the Lions cleared out his locker, indicating that the team could be moving on without him. He was officially released by the Lions on December 9, 2016.

=== NFL statistics ===
| Season | | | | Receiving | | | | | Fumbles |
| Year | Team | GP | GS | Rec | Yds | Avg | TD | Lng | Fum |
|---|---|---|---|---|---|---|---|---|---|
| 2009 | DET | 11 | 11 | 30 | 346 | 11.5 | 2 | 30 | 1 |
| 2010 | DET | 16 | 16 | 71 | 722 | 10.2 | 4 | 35 | 0 |
| 2011 | DET | 16 | 16 | 83 | 777 | 9.4 | 5 | 27 | 0 |
| 2012 | DET | 14 | 11 | 59 | 567 | 9.6 | 3 | 24 | 4 |
| 2013 | DET | 14 | 14 | 41 | 416 | 10.1 | 2 | 31 | 1 |
| 2014 | DET | 14 | 9 | 10 | 70 | 7.0 | 0 | 13 | 0 |
| 2015 | DET | 8 | 8 | 7 | 67 | 9.6 | 1 | 21 | 0 |
| 2016 | DET | -- | -- | -- | -- | -- | -- | -- | -- |
| Career | | 93 | 85 | 301 | 2,965 | 9.9 | 17 | 35 | 6 |

== Personal life ==
Pettigrew was arrested for disorderly conduct and public drunkenness on February 5, 2017, after an Oklahoma City, Oklahoma bar fight.

Pettigrew was arrested on July 9, 2018, in Pittsburgh, Pennsylvania, accused of aggravated assault after an argument arose regarding an unpaid limo fee. In November 2018, charges of aggravated assault and diversion of services were withdrawn.

Pettigrew was arrested June 2, 2024, after an altercation in a Dallas convenience store.
