= Jahvid Best =

American football player and coach (born 1989)

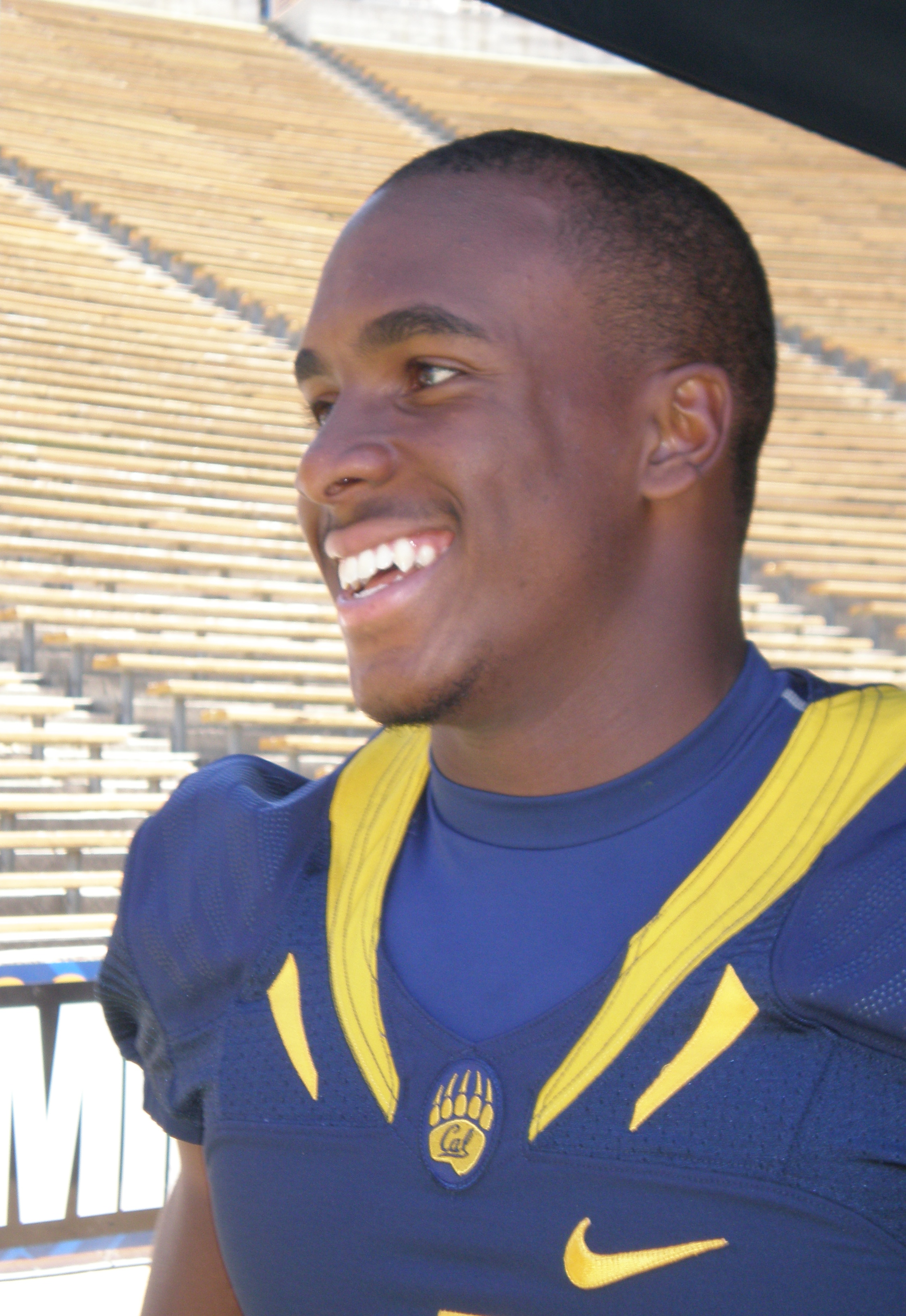
- Best in 2009

No. 44
- Position: Running back

Personal information
- Born: January 30, 1989 (age 37); Vallejo, California, U.S.
- Listed height: 5 ft 10 in (1.78 m)
- Listed weight: 199 lb (90 kg)

Career information
- High school: Salesian (Richmond, California)
- College: California (2007–2009)
- NFL draft: 2010: 1st round, 30th overall pick

Career history
- Detroit Lions (2010–2012)

Awards and highlights
- 2× First-team All-Pac-10 (2007, 2008); Second-team All-Pac-10 (2009)

Career NFL statistics
- Rushing attempts: 255
- Rushing yards: 945
- Rushing touchdowns: 6
- Receptions: 85
- Receiving yards: 774
- Receiving touchdowns: 3
- Stats at Pro Football Reference

Jahvid Andre Best (born January 30, 1989) is an American track and field Olympian athlete, and former professional football running back. He was selected by the Detroit Lions in the first round of the 2010 NFL draft. He played college football for the California Golden Bears, setting several school records, including most all-purpose yards in a single season and most rushing yards in a single game. Best also led the Pac-10 in total rushing yards in 2008. Best competed in the 2016 Summer Olympics, representing Saint Lucia in track and field. He later became head football coach of the Saint Mary's College High School Panthers in Berkeley, California, for one season.

Best is currently a police officer with the San Francisco Police Department.

== Early life ==
Best attended Salesian High School in Richmond, California, where he played for the Salesian Chieftains high school football team. In his junior year in 2005 he had 1,495 rushing yards on 138 attempts with 20 touchdowns as Salesian won the North Coast Section championship to conclude a 12–1 season. In his senior year, Best ran for 3,325 yards and 48 touchdowns, both Bay Area single-season records. Salesian once again made it to the NCS finals, but lost in the final game to St. Patrick-St. Vincent High School of Vallejo.

Considered a four-star recruit by Rivals.com, Best was listed as the No. 9 running back in the nation in 2007.

=== Track and field ===
Best ran track as well, participating in the Arcadia Invitational in his junior and senior years. As a junior, he won the 100 meter dash with a time of 10.36 seconds with an injured foot. At the 2006 CIF California State Meet, he finished third in the 200 metres behind Bryshon Nellum and Devin Mays. As a senior, he won the Arcadia Invitational 200 meter dash with a time of 21.40 seconds. Also during his senior year, Best won the CIF California State Meet 100 meters with a discounted wind assisted (2.4 m/s) time of 10.31, ahead of Charles Saseun and Randall Carroll. In the 200 metres, Best was runner-up (20.65) to Nellum (20.43), both far ahead of the competition. Best finished his senior season with personal bests of 10.31 and 20.65, the 5th and 2nd fastest times in the nation respectively.

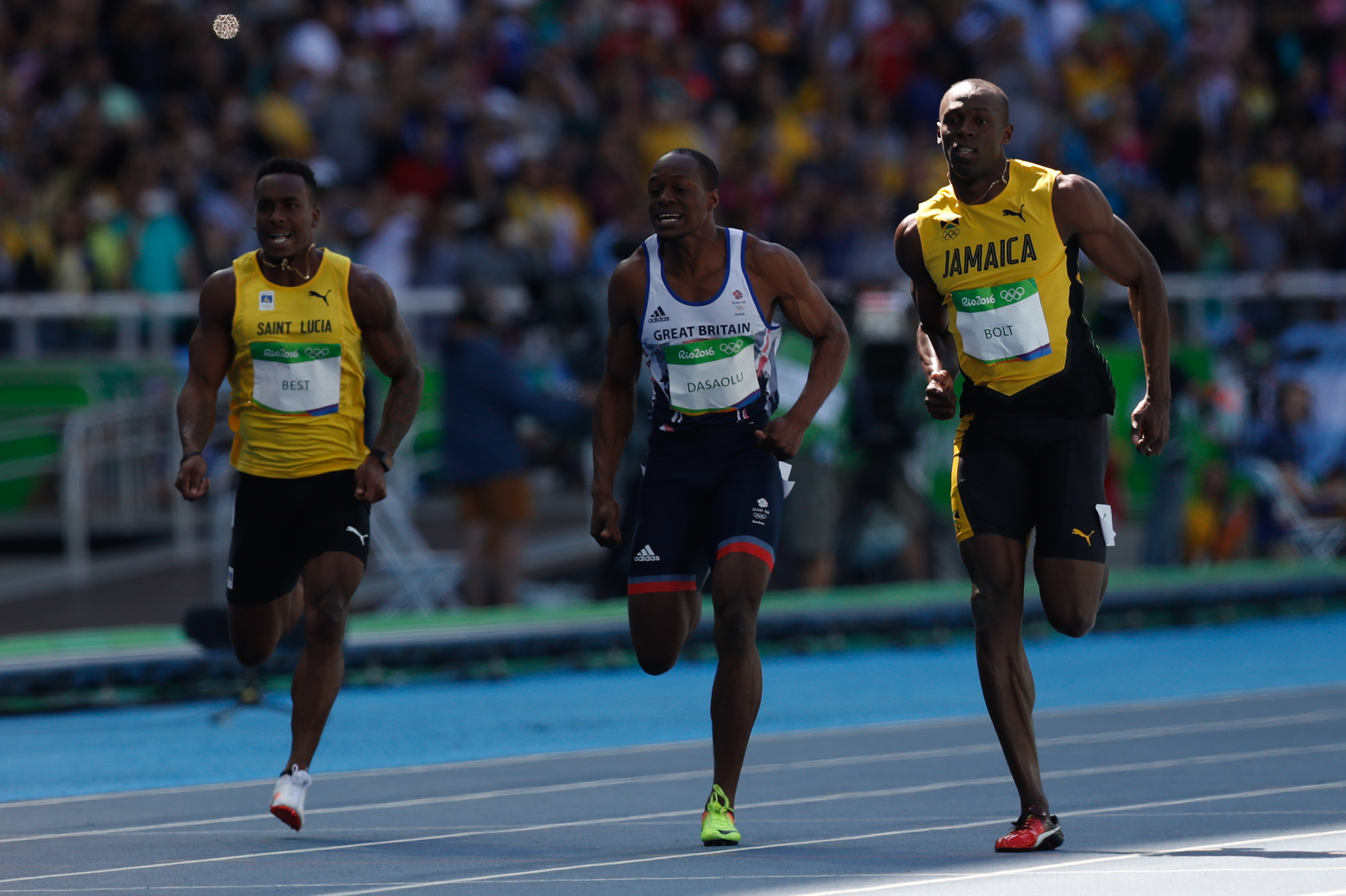
Best at 2016 Olympics next to James Dasaolu and Usain Bolt

Personal bests

Event	Time (seconds)	Venue	Date
100 meters	10.16	San Diego, California	April 2, 2016
200 meters	20.65	Sacramento, California	June 2, 2007
400 meters	48.70	Palo Alto, California	March 31, 2007

Best ran in the 100 meters at the 2016 Olympics in Heat 7 of the first round, losing to eventual (three time) gold medalist Usain Bolt, former silver medalist Richard Thompson, European champion James Dasaolu and world youth record holder Yoshihide Kiryū.

== College career ==
Best received scholarship offers from Arizona, Arizona State, California, Michigan, Notre Dame, Oregon, USC, and Washington among others, before ultimately committing to California in 2006.

=== 2007 ===
As a true freshman in 2007, Best was the primary backup to Justin Forsett. On only 29 carries, Best had 221 rushing yards, and two touchdowns. Best also caught 13 passes for 174 yards and a receiving touchdown. Best was selected as the team's Most Valuable Freshman as well as the team's J. Scott Duncan Award (Most Valuable Special Teams Player).

=== 2008 ===
Best quickly got the nation's attention in the season opener against Michigan State on August 30. Best had 111 yards on 24 carries including a touchdown. His breakout game came on September 6 in a 66–3 Cal win against Washington State, having two touchdown runs of 80 and 86 yards, respectively. Best finished the game with exactly 200 yards and three rushing touchdowns.

Best struggled the following week against Maryland. This was mostly due to California falling behind early, therefore limiting Best's touches, due to a change in game plan by the Bears. Although he returned to form against Colorado State, he dislocated his elbow and would miss the next game against Arizona State. He returned for the Arizona game, and dashed for a 67-yard score that put the Bears ahead in the second quarter. He recorded 140 all purpose yards against the Wildcats.

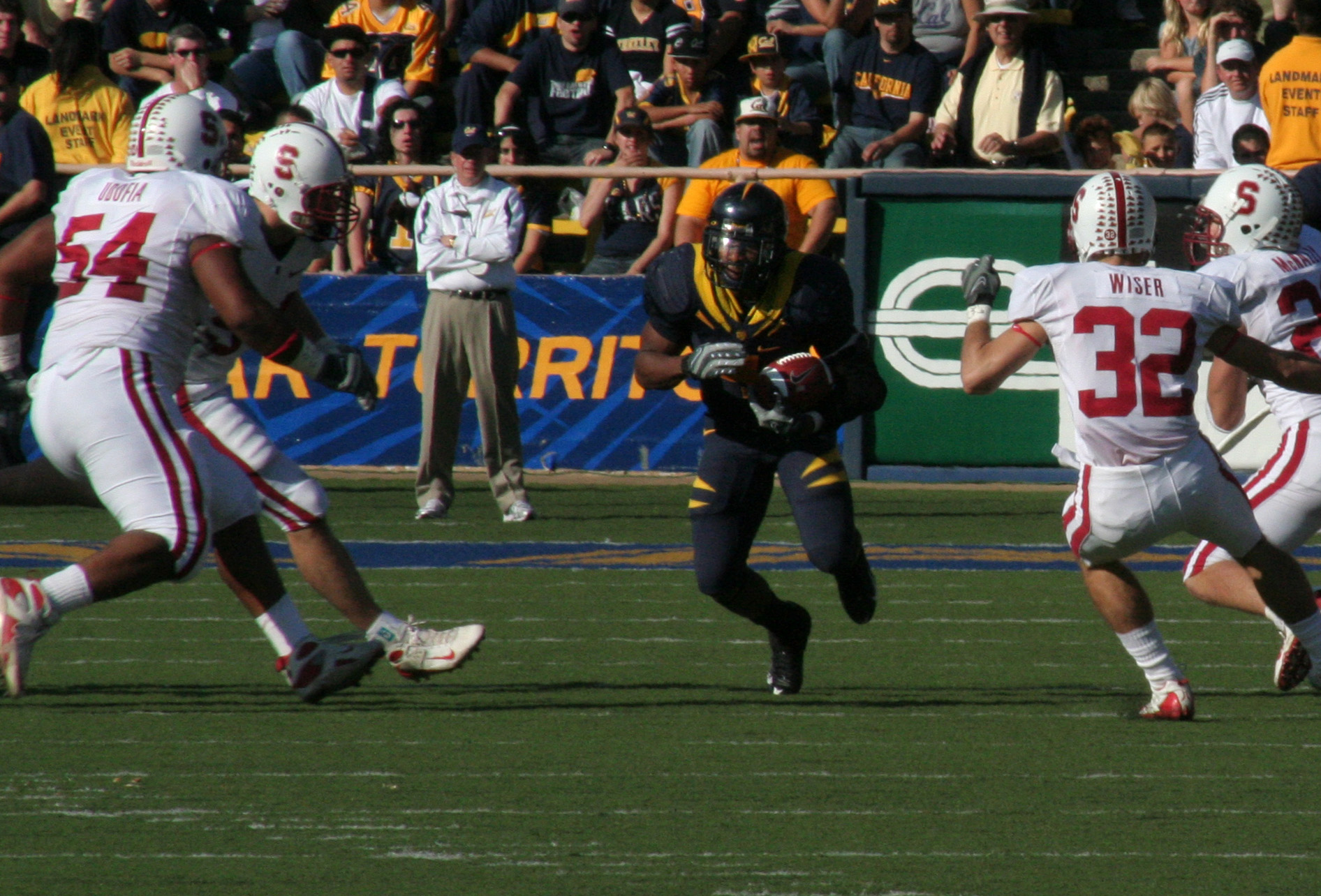
Best carries the ball during the Big Game

After two more impressive outings against UCLA and Oregon, where he averaged over six yards per carry, Best was held to only 30 yards against the USC Trojans. Following a 201-yard rushing game against the Stanford Cardinal in the 2008 Big Game on 19 carries, Best became the seventh consecutive 1,000 rusher for Cal since Jeff Tedford became head coach in 2002. During the last game of the regular season versus Washington on December 6, Best became the first Cal player to rush for over 300 yards in a game and ended the regular season as the Pac-10's leading rusher, beating out Oregon State's Jacquizz Rodgers.

A 186-yard, two touchdown performance in the 2008 Emerald Bowl earned him Offensive MVP honors for the game. Best finished the 2008 season with 1,580 rushing yards, an 8.1-yard per carry average, and 15 touchdowns.

=== 2009 ===
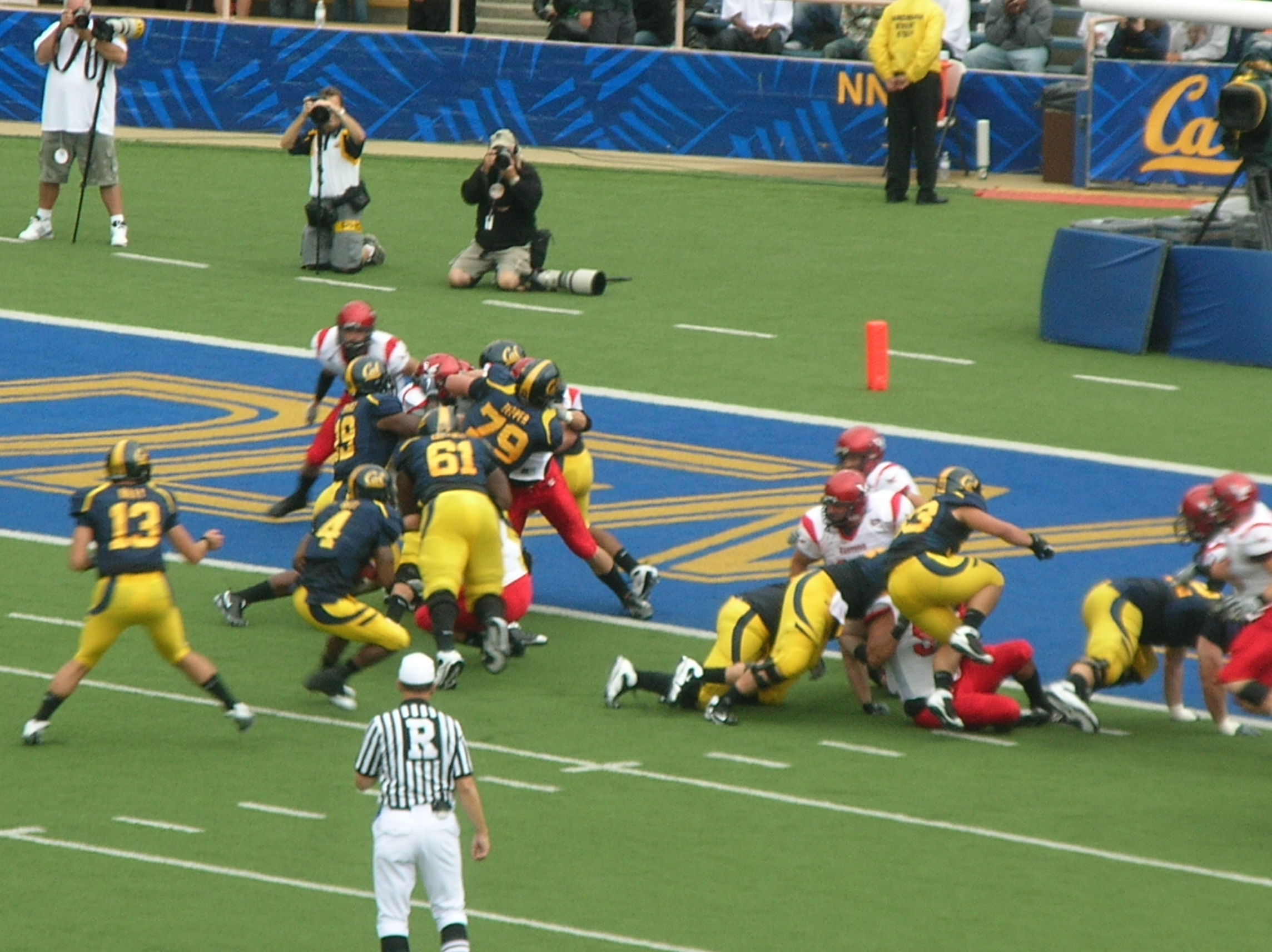
Best carries the ball against Eastern Washington in September 2009

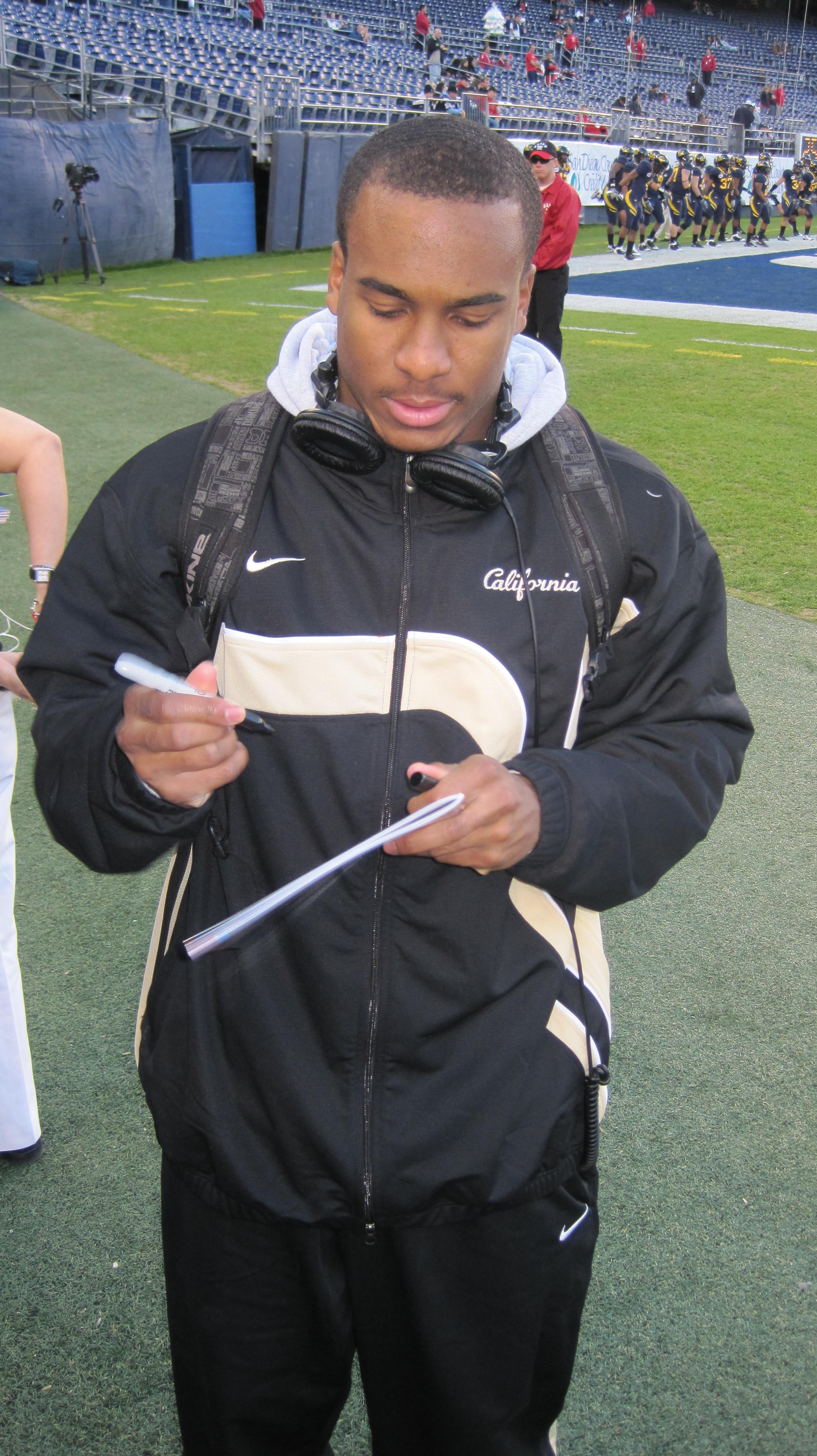
Best at the 2009 Poinsettia Bowl

On January 15, 2009, Best underwent surgery to tighten a ligament that had been injured when he dislocated his left elbow against Colorado State on September 27, 2008. This was followed up by foot surgery on January 23 to relieve irritation that was caused when Best bruised his foot halfway through the 2008 season. He missed spring football practice as a result. Best was named as the most explosive player in college football by Rivals.com in February 2009. In early June Best was able to participate in team summer workouts without pain. Entering his junior year, Best's breakout sophomore year caused early speculation of him being a future Heisman candidate and top running back prospect.

In Cal's season opener against Maryland, Best rushed for 137 yards and had two rushing touchdowns in the Bears' 52–13 victory. On September 12 against Eastern Washington, he rushed for 144 yards and one touchdown, and had one 22 yard receiving touchdown. On September 19 against Minnesota he ran for 131 yards and all of Cal's five touchdowns in the victory, a personal best and a modern school record. He was named Pac-10 Player of the Week and Rivals.com National Player of the Week. However, the next week Best was held to 55 rushing yards and no touchdowns on 16 carries against the Oregon Ducks. The following week, he was held to 48 yards on 15 carries against the #7 Trojans, also unable to find the end zone. On October 17, Best recorded both his longest run and longest reception against UCLA in California's 45–26 victory over the Bruins.

Best was injured during the second quarter of Cal's November 7 matchup against Oregon State. In the process of scoring a rushing touchdown, he hurdled a defender into the end zone and was pushed by a second Oregon State defender in mid-air, causing him to land on the back of his head with his helmet coming off. The play resulted in a concussion for Best. After a 13-minute game delay, Best was taken off the field on a stretcher to the Highland General Hospital in Oakland. This was his second concussion in two weeks, following a mild concussion received the previous week against Arizona State. He was released the next day. and did not play the following week's game against Arizona, although he appeared as an honorary team captain. Best missed the rest of the regular season. On December 16, head coach Jeff Tedford announced that Best would not play in the 2009 Poinsettia Bowl, stating that "'to get him back in game-ready form I don't feel like that's something that we can get done to have him ready to play.'" Best announced on January 2, 2010, that he was foregoing his senior year and enter the NFL draft.

=== Records ===
- Cal record for most rushing yards in a single game at 311, achieved on December 6, 2008, against the Washington Huskies
- Second highest Cal single season rushing record with 1,580 yards in 2008, second to J. J. Arrington's record of 2,018 yards in 2004
- Most all purpose yards in a single season (2008) with 2,247 total yards
- 2008 Emerald Bowl rushing record with 186 yards
- Set a modern era Cal record for most rushing touchdowns in a single game with five scored against Minnesota on September 19, 2009. Dick Dunn rushed for six in 1922.

== Professional career ==
=== Pre-draft ===
Pre-draft measurables
Height	Weight	Arm length	Hand span	40-yard dash	10-yard split	20-yard split	20-yard shuttle	Three-cone drill	Vertical jump	Broad jump	Bench press	Wonderlic
5 ft 10 1/8 in (1.78 m)	199 lb (90 kg)	31 3/4 in (0.81 m)	9 in (0.23 m)	4.35 s	1.51 s	2.55 s	4.17 s	6.75 s	35.5 in (0.90 m)	9 ft 5 in (2.87 m)	18 reps	24
All values from NFL Combine

At the NFL Scouting Combine, Best tied for the sixth fastest overall 40 yard dash time and was the fastest among running backs.

=== 2010 season ===
Best was selected in a pick trade from the Minnesota Vikings by the Detroit Lions 30th overall in the 2010 NFL draft. Regarding the pick, Lions head coach Jim Schwartz said, "Some people watch adult videos on their computer... I go to YouTube and watch Jahvid Best highlight clips. That’s what gets me aroused." Best signed a five-year, $9.8 million contract with the Lions on July 30.

Best started 9 games, scoring his first career NFL rushing touchdowns in the regular season opener on September 12 against the Chicago Bears. His best game of the season came the following week in a 35–32 loss to the Philadelphia Eagles, where he had 78 rushing yards, two rushing touchdowns, and 154 receiving yards, including a 75-yard touchdown reception. He had more limited production for the rest of the season mainly due to a turf toe injury, with a career-low two rushing yards in Week 11 against the Dallas Cowboys, and did not score any further rushing touchdowns, although he had a 53-yard receiving touchdown against the Miami Dolphins in Week 16 during the Lions' four-game winning streak. Overall, he appeared in 16 games, of which he started nine. He finished with 171 carries for 555 rushing yards and four rushing touchdowns to go along with 58 receptions for 487 receiving yards and two receiving touchdowns.

=== 2011 season ===
Best suffered a concussion on his second carry in the Lions third pre-season game of the season on August 19, a 30–28 win versus the Cleveland Browns. On Monday Night Football on October 10 against the Chicago Bears, Best had his first 100-yard game, rushing for 163 yards and a career long 88-yard touchdown run. During the second half of the Lions 25–19 loss to San Francisco 49ers on October 16, Best suffered another concussion, the last game (pre- or regular season) Best played in the NFL. On November 25, Best was placed on IR due to post concussion symptoms.

=== 2012 season ===
On November 3, 2012, Best was placed on injured reserve due to continuing post-concussion issues, ending his season without playing in any pre- or regular season games.

In late November 2012, Best had been undergoing cognitive therapy to treat his post-concussive symptoms, hoping to return to the field for the 2013 season.

On July 17, 2013, Best was released by the Lions. The numerous concussions he suffered throughout his career prevented him from returning to the field during the 2012 season.

== Career statistics ==
=== NFL ===
Year	Team	Games		Rushing					Receiving					Fumbles	
Year	Team	GP	GS	Att	Yds	Avg	Lng	TD	Rec	Yds	Avg	Lng	TD	Fum	Lost
2010	DET	16	9	171	555	3.2	45	4	58	487	8.4	75T	2	1	1
2011	DET	6	6	84	390	4.6	88T	2	27	287	10.6	60	1	0	0
Total		22	15	255	945	3.7	88	6	85	774	9.1	75	3	1	1

=== College ===
Season	Team	Games		Rushing					Receiving		
Season	Team	GP	GS	Att	Yds	Avg	Lng	TD	Rec	Yds	TD
2007	California	10	0	29	221	7.6	64	2	13	74	1
2008	California	12	12	194	1,580	8.1	86	15	27	246	1
2009	California	9	9	141	867	6.1	93	12	22	213	4
Career		31	21	364	2,668	7.3	93	29	62	533	6

== Track and field career ==
In May 2015, Best ran a 10.262 wind aided 100 meters in preparation for the 2016 USA Track and Field Championships in Eugene, Oregon. Best was training for the 2016 Summer Olympics, where he represented Saint Lucia, his father's home country. On April 2, 2016, he ran the official qualifying time for the Olympics 10.16 +1.9 at a meet at the University of California, San Diego. On July 16, 2016, Best was named to Saint Lucia's 2016 Olympics Track and Field team, where he competed in the 100 meters. He was the first former NFL player to participate in the Summer Olympic Games.

At the 2016 Olympics, Best ran a 10.39 in his heat of the 100 meters and did not advance to the semifinals.

== Coaching career ==
Best joined the Cal Bears coaching staff in January 2014. Saint Mary's College High School hired him as head coach in 2021. Best coached the Saint Mary Panthers to a 3–6 record in 2021 then abruptly quit. He was also a running backs coach for Bishop O'Dowd High School.

== Personal life ==
Best's name is a combination of Jah and the last syllable of his father's name, David. His father is originally from St. Lucia and he has one sister named Laurie who attended California State University, Sacramento.

In January 2014, Best sued the NFL and helmet maker Riddell, claiming the league "was aware of the evidence and the risks associated with repetitive traumatic brain injuries ... but deliberately ignored and actively concealed the information." The lawsuit was dismissed in June 2014 without prejudice due to Best's failure to serve the lawsuit.

As of February 2026, Best is currently serving as a police officer with the San Francisco Police Department.
