= DeAndre Levy =

American football player (born 1987)

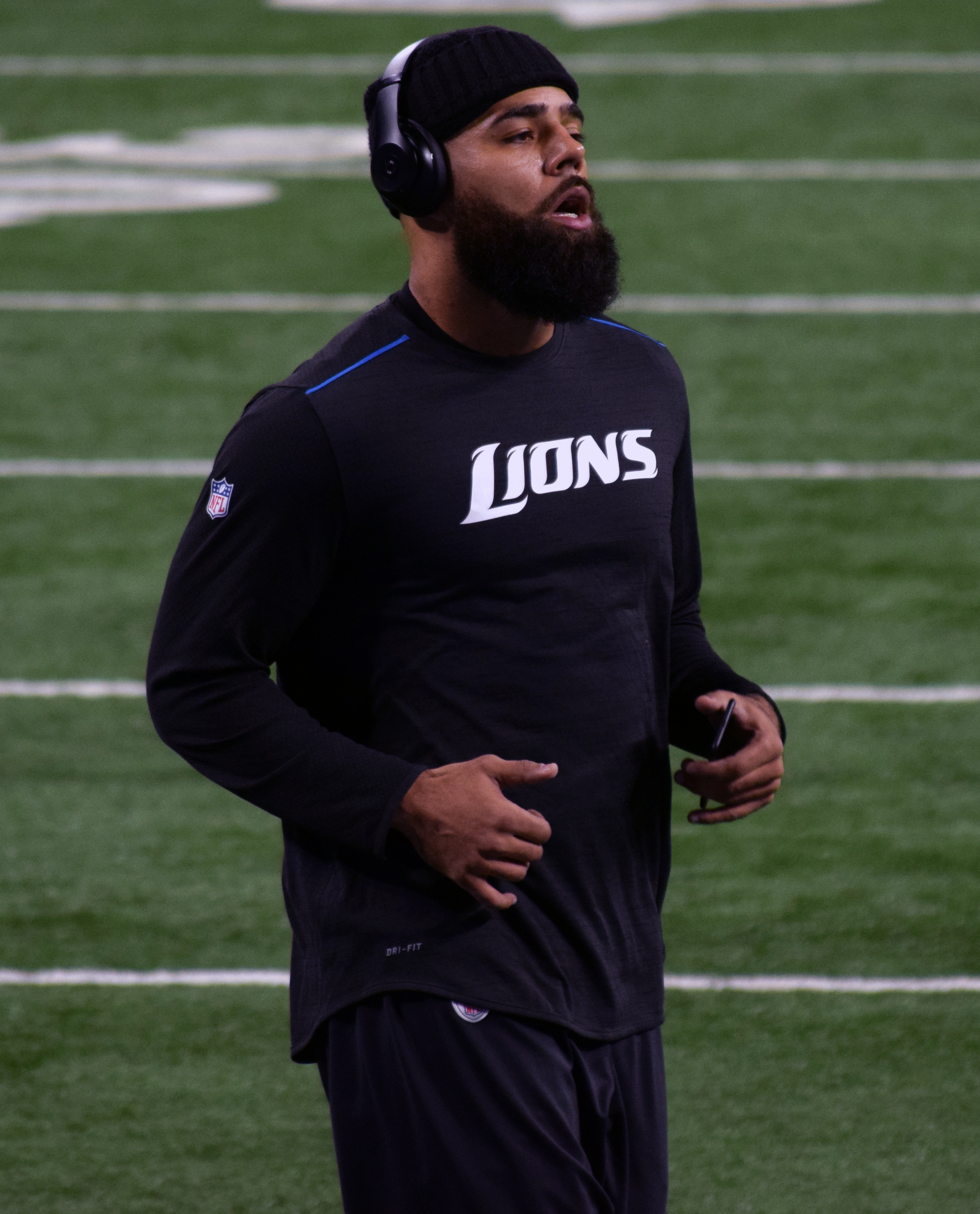
- Levy in 2017

No. 54
- Position: Linebacker

Personal information
- Born: March 26, 1987 (age 39); Milwaukee, Wisconsin, U.S.
- Listed height: 6 ft 2 in (1.88 m)
- Listed weight: 234 lb (106 kg)

Career information
- High school: Vincent (Milwaukee)
- College: Wisconsin
- NFL draft: 2009: 3rd round, 76th overall pick

Career history
- Detroit Lions (2009–2016)

Awards and highlights
- Second-team All-Pro (2014); NFL solo tackles leader (2014)

Career NFL statistics
- Total tackles: 638
- Sacks: 3.5
- Forced fumbles: 2
- Fumble recoveries: 5
- Interceptions: 12
- Defensive touchdowns: 2
- Stats at Pro Football Reference

DeAndre Levy (born March 26, 1987) is an American former professional football player who was a linebacker in the National Football League (NFL). He played college football for the Wisconsin Badgers, and was selected by the Detroit Lions in the third round of the 2009 NFL draft.

== Early life ==
Levy was born in Milwaukee, Wisconsin, where he attended Vincent High School and was a letterman in football, basketball, and track. As a senior, he recorded 84 tackles, five sacks, and four forced fumbles as a linebacker, and 12 receptions for 260 yards and three touchdowns as a tight end.

== College career ==
Levy played college football for the Wisconsin Badgers from 2005 to 2008. He finished his career with 211 tackles, 21 sacks, two interceptions, six forced fumbles, six fumble recoveries and a blocked kick.

In November 2006, Levy inadvertently collided with nearly 80-year-old Penn State coach Joe Paterno on the sideline during a game, fracturing Paterno's shin bone and damaging knee ligaments. Subsequent to the Penn State child sex abuse scandal, Levy now calls that incident "my proudest moment in college". In response, 21 former Penn State football players signed a letter condemning his comments.

Levy was named second-team All-Big Ten in 2007. In 2008, he earned honorable mention All-Big Ten, and was also awarded the team's Tom Wiesner Award, given to a senior football player who most exemplifies the leadership and courage. In addition to twice winning the Big 10 Player of the Week, in 2008, he was also awarded the Bronko Nagurski National Defensive Player of the Week on September 13 for his performance against Fresno St.

== Professional career ==
Pre-draft measurables
Height	Weight	Arm length	Hand span	Broad jump	Bench press
6 ft 1 3/4 in (1.87 m)	236 lb (107 kg)	31 7/8 in (0.81 m)	9 3/8 in (0.24 m)	9 ft 11 in (3.02 m)	19 reps
All values from NFL Combine

Levy was selected by the Lions in the third round of the 2009 NFL draft. As a rookie, Levy started 10 of 16 games for the Detroit Lions, recording 85 tackles and an interception.

In 2010, Levy was limited to only 11 games, missing Detroit's Week 1, 2, 4, 5, and 6 games. For the season, Levy recorded 72 tackles, 2 interceptions, and 4 pass-breakups. In Week 14, against the eventual Super Bowl Champion Green Bay Packers, Levy had 8 tackles and an interception of Packers QB Matt Flynn in the endzone in a 7–3 Lions win. In Week 16, against the Miami Dolphins, Levy returned an interception of Chad Henne 30 yards for the game-winning touchdown in a 34–27 win.

In his third season in 2011, Levy started all 16 games for the Lions, recording 109 tackles, a sack, an interception, and a forced fumble. In 2012, Levy started 13 games for the Lions, recording 82 tackles, and 1 interception. In 2013, Levy started all 16 games for the Lions, recording 119 tackles, and 6 interceptions. In 2014, Levy started all 16 games for the Lions, recording 151 tackles, 2.5 sacks, and 1 interception.

On August 5, 2015, it was announced that Levy and the Detroit Lions agreed on a four-year extension. Levy only played 1 game in the 2015 season due to injury.

In 2016, Levy's playing time was limited due to a torn meniscus he suffered at the beginning of the 2016 season. On March 9, 2017, with two years left on his contract, he was released by the Lions. He filed an injury grievance against the Lions in August.

== NFL career statistics ==
Legend
	Led the league
**Bold**	Career high

=== Regular season ===
Year	Team	Games		Tackles					Interceptions					Fumbles			
Year	Team	GP	GS	Cmb	Solo	Ast	Sck	TFL	Int	Yds	TD	Lng	PD	FF	FR	Yds	TD
2009	DET	**16**	10	85	61	24	0.0	7	1	5	0	5	5	**1**	**2**	0	0
2010	DET	11	11	72	50	22	0.0	1	2	41	**1**	30	4	0	**2**	0	0
2011	DET	**16**	**16**	109	73	**36**	1.0	9	1	7	0	7	1	**1**	0	0	0
2012	DET	14	13	82	57	25	0.0	9	1	−1	0	0	3	0	1	0	0
2013	DET	**16**	**16**	118	85	33	0.0	8	**6**	**76**	**1**	**66**	**15**	0	0	0	0
2014	DET	**16**	**16**	**151**	**117**	34	**2.5**	**16**	1	13	0	13	4	0	0	0	0
2015	DET	1	1	0	0	0	0.0	0	0	0	0	0	0	0	0	0	0
2016	DET	5	3	21	16	5	0.0	0	0	0	0	0	1	0	0	0	0
		95	86	638	459	179	3.5	50	12	141	2	66	33	2	5	0	0

=== Playoffs ===
Year	Team	Games		Tackles					Interceptions					Fumbles			
Year	Team	GP	GS	Cmb	Solo	Ast	Sck	TFL	Int	Yds	TD	Lng	PD	FF	FR	Yds	TD
2011	DET	**1**	**1**	2	2	0	0.0	0	0	0	0	0	0	0	0	0	0
2014	DET	**1**	**1**	**4**	**3**	**1**	0.0	0	0	0	0	0	0	0	0	0	0
2016	DET	**1**	**1**	3	2	**1**	0.0	0	0	0	0	0	0	0	0	0	0
		3	3	9	7	2	0.0	0	0	0	0	0	0	0	0	0	0

== Personal life ==
Levy continues to reside in the Detroit metro area with his wife Desiré, whom he met in college and married in 2017. The couple has two children. Levy's father-in-law is NFL Executive Vice President of Football Operations, Troy Vincent and his brother-in-law, Taron Vincent, played football at the Ohio State University.

Since retiring, and while still a player, he has been an advocate for victims of sexual assault. In April 2016, DeAndre wrote a column for The Players' Tribune encouraging men and especially professional athletes to take leadership in sexual assault prevention. Not only did players respond in support of his article, but victims also reached out and shared their stories.

The couple commissioned a mural in Eastern Market in 2017 to encourage survivors of sexual assault and harassment to open up about their stories. They have also led fundraising efforts for related causes and organizations, such as Enough SAID (Sexual Assault in Detroit).

In 2020, Levy appeared as a guest on Jada Pinkett Smith's Red Table Talk, along with Amber Rose and Rumer Willis to discuss sexual consent.

Levy also spoke out about the NFL's stance on the link between professional football and brain injuries in 2016, taking the NFL to task via a letter and various Instagram posts. He called for greater transparency about the risks of playing professional football, though he made it clear that he still wanted others to enjoy playing.
