= Randy Phillips (American football) =

American football player (born 1987)

No. 25, 33
- Position: Safety

Personal information
- Born: September 14, 1986 (age 40); Belle Glade, Florida, U.S.
- Listed height: 6 ft 1 in (1.85 m)
- Listed weight: 210 lb (95 kg)

Career information
- High school: Glades Central (Belle Glade)
- College: Miami (FL)
- NFL draft: 2010: undrafted

Career history
- Detroit Lions (2010–2011); Sacramento Mountain Lions (2012)

Career NFL statistics
- Games played: 4
- Total tackles: 5
- Forced fumbles: 1
- Stats at Pro Football Reference

Randy Phillips (born September 14, 1987) is an American former professional football player who was a safety in the National Football League (NFL). He played college football for the Miami Hurricanes and was signed by the Detroit Lions as an undrafted free agent in 2010.

Phillips was released by the Lions on August 17, 2011.
