= Isaiah Ekejiuba =

Nigerian gridiron football player (born 1981)

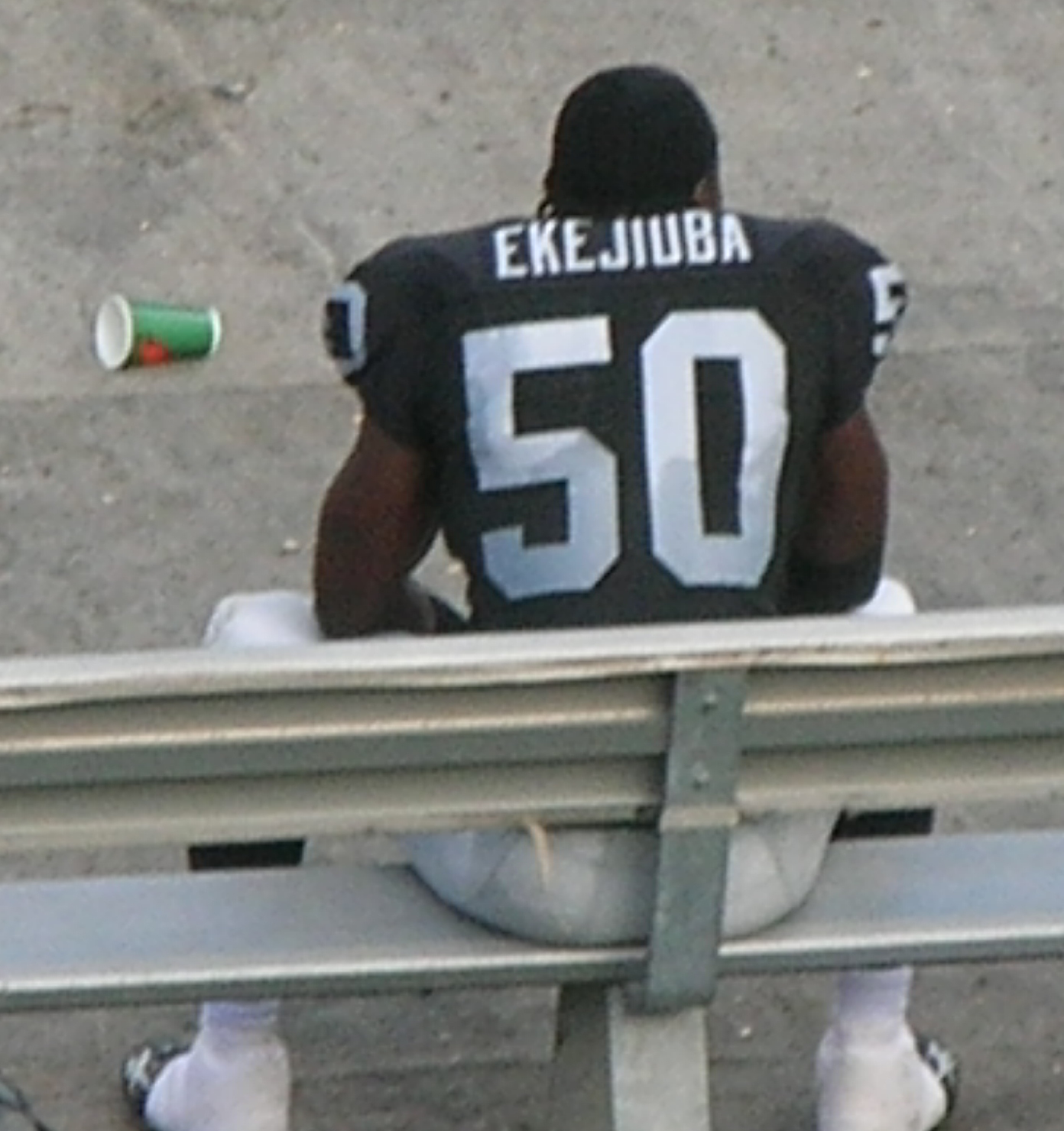
- Ekejiuba in November 2008

No. 50
- Position: Linebacker/ Special teamer

Personal information
- Born: October 5, 1981 (age 45); Nigeria
- Listed height: 6 ft 4 in (1.93 m)
- Listed weight: 240 lb (109 kg)

Career information
- High school: Suffield (CT) Academy
- College: Virginia
- NFL draft: 2005: undrafted

Career history
- Arizona Cardinals (2005)*; Oakland Raiders (2005–2009); Detroit Lions (2010–2011)
- * Offseason or practice squad member only

Awards and highlights
- George Welsh Award (2004)

Career NFL statistics
- Total tackles: 61
- Forced fumbles: 2
- Fumble recoveries: 1
- Stats at Pro Football Reference

Isaiah Afamefuna Ekejiuba [Eck-ah-ju-buh] (born October 5, 1981) is a Nigerian-American former football linebacker. He was originally signed by the Arizona Cardinals as an undrafted free agent in 2005. He played college football at Virginia.

Ekejiuba has also played for the Oakland Raiders and the Detroit Lions of the National Football League (NFL).

== Early life ==
Ekejiuba was born in Nigeria and lived throughout parts of Africa, China and London while his mother worked for the United Nations, before moving to upstate New York where his mother taught at Colgate University. Ekejiuba attended high school at Suffield Academy, a boarding school in Connecticut. At Suffield, Ekejiuba played football his senior year and excelled in soccer, basketball and track.

== College career ==
In 2002, Ekejiuba joined the Virginia Cavaliers in the NCAA.

Ekejiuba was on the Virginia football roster in the 2002 season as a wide receiver, but did not play in the whole season.

Prior to the 2003 season, he switched his position to linebacker. Leading the special teams, Ekejiuba was awarded a scholarship prior to the start of the season. He played on the punt, punt return, kickoff and kickoff return units.

=== Statistics ===
NCAA defensive stats
Year	G	Plys	S	A	Tot.	Avg.	TFL	QBS	FR	FC	PBU	Int	QBH	BlK
2003	13	76	3	4	7	0.5	0	0	0	0	0	0	0	0
2004	12	121	6	2	8	0.7	1-1	0	0	1	0	0	0	0
Total	25	197	9	6	15	0.6	1-1	0	0	1	0	0	0	0

== Professional career ==
=== Arizona Cardinals ===
After going undrafted in the 2005 NFL draft, Ekejiuba signed with the Arizona Cardinals. He spent training camp with the team but was released before the regular season.

=== Oakland Raiders ===
On September 6, 2005, Ekejiuba was signed to the practice squad of the Oakland Raiders. He spent the first seven weeks of the season there before being promoted to the active roster on October 28.

A restricted free agent in the 2008 offseason, Ekejiuba was tendered a one-year contract by the Raiders. He was re-signed on April 14.

Ekejiuba was a 3rd alternate for the 2009 Pro Bowl on special teams.

On July 8, 2010, Ekejiuba was released.

=== Detroit Lions ===
Ekejiuba signed with the Detroit Lions on July 23, 2010.

=== Career statistics ===
NFL defensive stats
Year	Team	GP	Tackles	Sacks	FF	FR	Int	TD
2005	Oak	10	8	0	0	0	0	0
2006	Oak	12	5	0	0	0	0	0
2007	Oak	10	12	0	0	0	0	0
2008	Oak	16	8	0	1	1	0	0
2009	Oak	16	16	0	0	0	0	0
2010	Det	9	10	0	1	0	0	0
2011	Det	3	2	0	0	0	0	0
Total		76	61	0	2	1	0	0

== Personal life ==
The son of the late Felicia Ekejiuba, Ekejiuba has two brothers, Ben Umezurike and Sam Ekejiuba, and two sisters, Ada Umezurike and Felicia Ekejiuba. At the University of Virginia, he majored in electrical engineering.
