= Early Doucet =

American football player (born 1985)

No. 80, 85
- Position: Wide receiver

Personal information
- Born: October 28, 1985 (age 41); New Iberia, Louisiana, U.S.
- Listed height: 6 ft 0 in (1.83 m)
- Listed weight: 212 lb (96 kg)

Career information
- High school: St. Martinville (St. Martinville, Louisiana)
- College: LSU (2004–2007)
- NFL draft: 2008: 3rd round, 81st overall pick

Career history
- Arizona Cardinals (2008–2012); Seattle Seahawks (2013)*
- * Offseason or practice squad member only

Awards and highlights
- BCS national champion (2007); Freshman All-SEC (2004); Second-team All-SEC (2006)

Career NFL statistics
- Receptions: 139
- Receiving yards: 1,491
- Receiving touchdowns: 7
- Stats at Pro Football Reference

Early Joseph Doucet III (born October 28, 1985) is an American former professional football player who was a wide receiver in the National Football League (NFL). He was selected by the Arizona Cardinals in the third round of the 2008 NFL draft. He played college football for the LSU Tigers.

== Early life ==
Early Doucet prepped at St. Martinville High School in St. Martinville, Louisiana. Doucet was the top-rated receiver in the nation, as well one of the top five athletes. He was named an All-American by Parade. As a senior, he was named to First-team 4A all-state as well was honorable mention academic all-state. Doucet was exceptionally versatile, playing quarterback, running back, receiver, and return man for his team. He ran for 3,592 yards on 470 carries and 52 touchdowns during his career. Doucet also participated in four different postseason teams, helping his basketball team, which included future LSU athlete Darrel Mitchell, to the state championship, as well as taking his football team to the state semi-finals twice. He played in the 2004 U.S. Army All-American Bowl, which is a national all-star game for some of the nation's best and brightest high school football players.

== College career ==
Doucet was a member of the Louisiana State University (LSU) Tigers. After catching 18 passes for 257 yards and two touchdowns in his first season, he was named to the All-SEC freshman team. Doucet played in 12 games, with three starts. His first career touchdown came on a 12-yard pass from JaMarcus Russell.

Doucet began playing a bigger part on the team his sophomore year, during which he played in 12 games and started five. He did not play in the 2005 Chick-fil-A Peach Bowl against the University of Miami Hurricanes due to an ankle injury, which he got during the SEC Championship Game against Georgia. He finished the season with 26 catches for 389 yards and five touchdowns.

In his junior year, Doucet played in 13 games with six starts, playing with Dwayne Bowe and Craig Davis to form a dangerous receiver corps. He improved his statistics drastically, finishing the season with 59 catches for 772 yards and eight touchdowns. He also rushed the ball eight times for 59 yards and two touchdowns. He played an instrumental role in the 2007 Sugar Bowl, where he caught eight passes for 115 yards in a rout of Notre Dame.

As a senior in 2007, Doucet recorded 57 receptions, 525 yards, and five touchdowns.

== Professional career ==
=== Pre-draft ===
Doucet was regarded as one of the better wide receivers available in the 2008 NFL draft, and drew comparisons to Reggie Wayne. Since he neither has the speed nor size of elite wideout prospects, Doucet was projected as second to third round pick and a "No. 3 receiver" in the NFL.

Pre-draft measurables
Height	Weight	Arm length	Hand span	40-yard dash	10-yard split	20-yard split	20-yard shuttle	Three-cone drill	Vertical jump	Broad jump
6 ft 0 1/8 in (1.83 m)	209 lb (95 kg)	31 1/8 in (0.79 m)	9 in (0.23 m)	4.56 s	1.56 s	2.64 s	4.55 s	7.47 s	34.5 in (0.88 m)	9 ft 6 in (2.90 m)
All values from NFL Combine/LSU's Pro Day

=== Arizona Cardinals ===
Doucet was picked in the third round by the Arizona Cardinals with the 81st pick overall.

In his NFL debut against the Buffalo Bills in Week 5, Doucet caught six passes for 42 yards. To round out his rookie season, Doucet reached Super Bowl XLIII with the Cardinals. Arizona played the Pittsburgh Steelers for the NFL championship on February 1, 2009, resulting in a Cardinals' loss.

During the 2010 season, Doucet was out for several weeks after fracturing his ribs in Arizona's third preseason game. Doucet caught his first career playoff touchdown, a 15-yarder with 9:16 remaining in the first quarter of the NFC Wild Card playoff game between the Cardinals and Green Bay Packers on January 10, 2010. Doucet scored another touchdown with 2:16 before the half.

Before the 2011 season, Doucet changed his number from 80 to 85 to symbolize a new start. He finished the 2011 season with 54 receptions, 689 yards and five touchdowns, all career highs, in his fourth NFL season, which also included a couple long touchdown catches against the Carolina Panthers (70 yards) and San Francisco 49ers (60 yards).

On March 9, 2013, Doucet was released by the Arizona Cardinals.

=== Seattle Seahawks ===
On August 2, 2013, Doucet agreed to terms on a one-year deal with the Seattle Seahawks. Doucet was released five days later after only one practice session. Head coach Pete Carroll was dismissive when asked by the media why the sudden release of the wideout, however the official NFL transaction wire notes that Doucet was released with a "failure to disclose physical condition" tag.
