= Louisiana Mr. Basketball =

Basketball award in Louisiana

Each year the Louisiana Mr. Basketball award is given to the person chosen as the best high school boys basketball player in the U.S. state of Louisiana, in the United States.

== Award winners ==
Year	Player	Class	High School	College	NBA/NFL Draft
2026	Ahmad Hudson	Junior	Ruston High School	LSU (football)	
2025	Drew Timmons	Senior	Archbishop Hannan High School	Navy	
2024	Allen Graves	Senior	Ponchatoula High School	Santa Clara	2026 NBA draft: 1st rd, 19th overall by the Toronto Raptors
2023	Chris Lockett	Senior	Isidore Newman School	Boise State	
2022	Solomon Washington	Senior	G. W. Carver High School	Texas A&M	
2021	Carlos Stewart	Senior	The Dunham School	Santa Clara	
2020	Reece Beekman	Senior	Scotlandville Magnet High School	Virginia	
2019	Jalen Cook	Junior	Walker High School	LSU, Tulane	
2018	Javonte Smart (3)	Senior	Scotlandville Magnet High School	LSU	
2017	Javonte Smart (2)	Junior	Scotlandville Magnet High School	LSU	
2016	Javonte Smart	Sophomore	Scotlandville Magnet High School	LSU	
2015	Brandon Sampson	Senior	Madison Preparatory (Baton Rouge)	LSU	
2014	Reginal Johnson Jr.	Senior	Richwood	Alcorn State	
2013	Jarell Martin	Senior	Madison Preparatory (Baton Rouge)	LSU	2015 NBA draft: 1st rd, 25th overall by the Memphis Grizzlies
2012	DeQuavious Wagner	Senior	Peabody Magnet (Alexandria)	Arkansas, Angelo State, LSU-Alexandria	
2011	Rico Gathers	Junior	Riverside Academy (Reserve)	Baylor	2016 NFL draft: 6th rd, 217th overall by the Dallas Cowboys
2010	Markel Brown	Senior	Peabody Magnet (Alexandria)	Oklahoma State	2014 NBA draft: 2nd rd, 44th overall by the Minnesota Timberwolves
2009	Joevoskie Mitchell	Senior	Zwolle	Angelina College	
2008	Greg Monroe (2)	Senior	Helen Cox (Harvey)	Georgetown	2010 NBA draft: 1st rd, 7th overall by the Detroit Pistons
2007	Greg Monroe	Junior	Helen Cox (Harvey)	Georgetown	2010 NBA draft: 1st rd, 7th overall by the Detroit Pistons
2006	Demond "Tweety" Carter	Senior	Reserve Christian (Reserve)	Baylor	
2005	Tasmin Mitchell	Senior	Denham Springs	LSU	
2004	Glen Davis	Senior	University (Baton Rouge)	LSU	2007 NBA draft: 2nd rd, 35th overall by the Seattle SuperSonics
2003	Paul Millsap	Senior	Grambling	Louisiana Tech	2006 NBA draft: 2nd rd, 47th overall by the Utah Jazz
2002	Darrel Mitchell	Senior	St. Martinville	LSU	
2001	Donald Perry	Senior	McCall (Tallulah)	Indiana	
2000	Chris Duhon	Senior	Salmen (Slidell)	Duke	2004 NBA draft: 2nd rd, 38th overall by the Chicago Bulls
1999	Bernard King	Senior	Gibsland-Coleman (Gibsland)	Texas A&M	
1998	Stromile Swift	Senior	Fair Park (Shreveport)	LSU	2000 NBA draft: 1st rd, 2nd overall by the Vancouver Grizzlies
1997	Marcus Fizer	Senior	Arcadia	Iowa State	2000 NBA draft: 1sr rd, 4th overall by the Chicago Bulls
1996	Adarrial Smylie	Senior	St. Amant (Ascension Parish)	Southern	

=== Schools with multiple winners ===
School	Number of Awards	Years
Scotlandville Magnet	4	2016, 2017, 2018, 2020
Helen Cox	2	2007, 2008
Madison Preparatory	2	2013, 2015
Peabody Magnet	2	2010, 2012

=== Colleges with multiple winners ===
College	Number of Awards	Years
LSU	10	1998, 2002, 2004, 2005, 2013, 2015, 2016, 2017, 2018, 2019
Baylor	2	2006, 2011
Georgetown	2	2007, 2008
Santa Clara	2	2021, 2024
Texas A&M	2	1999, 2022
