= Rob Sims =

American football player (born 1983)

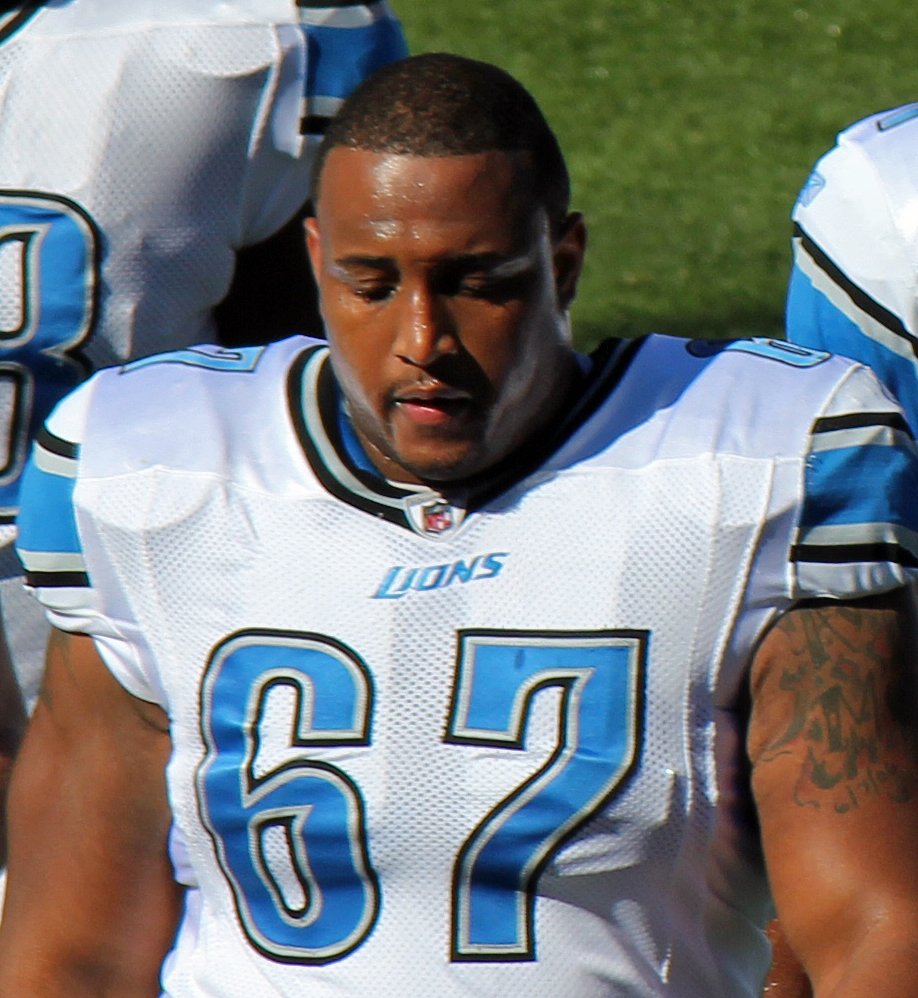
- Sims with the Detroit Lions in 2011

No. 67
- Position: Guard

Personal information
- Born: December 6, 1983 (age 42); Macedonia, Ohio, U.S.
- Listed height: 6 ft 3 in (1.91 m)
- Listed weight: 312 lb (142 kg)

Career information
- High school: Nordonia (Macedonia)
- College: Ohio State
- NFL draft: 2006: 4th round, 128th overall pick

Career history
- Seattle Seahawks (2006–2009); Detroit Lions (2010–2014)

Awards and highlights
- BCS national champion (2002); First-team All-Big Ten (2005)

Career NFL statistics
- Games played: 125
- Games started: 114
- Stats at Pro Football Reference

Robert Sims (born December 6, 1983) is an American former professional football player who was a guard in the National Football League (NFL). He played college football for the Ohio State Buckeyes and was selected by the Seattle Seahawks in the fourth round of the 2006 NFL draft.

== Professional career ==
Pre-draft measurables
Height	Weight	Arm length	Hand span	20-yard shuttle	Three-cone drill	Vertical jump	Broad jump	Bench press
6 ft 2 3/4 in (1.90 m)	307 lb (139 kg)	31 3/4 in (0.81 m)	9 1/8 in (0.23 m)	4.79 s	7.50 s	30.0 in (0.76 m)	8 ft 10 in (2.69 m)	27 reps

=== Seattle Seahawks ===
Sims was selected by the Seattle Seahawks in the fourth round of the 2006 NFL draft.

=== Detroit Lions ===
On April 5, 2010, Sims was traded to the Detroit Lions for defensive end Robert Henderson. Detroit also sent a 5th-round pick for a 7th-round pick as part of the trade in the 2010 NFL draft.

Sims was named the 2013 recipient of the Detroit Lions / Detroit Sports Broadcasters Association / Pro Football Writers Association's Media-Friendly "Good Guy" Award. The Good Guy Award is given yearly to the Lions player who shows consideration to and cooperation with the media at all times during the course of the season.

== Personal life ==
His father, Mickey Sims, also played in the NFL.

Sims is a business partner with former teammate Calvin Johnson in opening several cannabis facilities across the state of Michigan, under the brand name Primitiv. The pair have also formed a partnership with Harvard University to support medical cannabis research.
