= Darrel Mitchell =

American basketball player

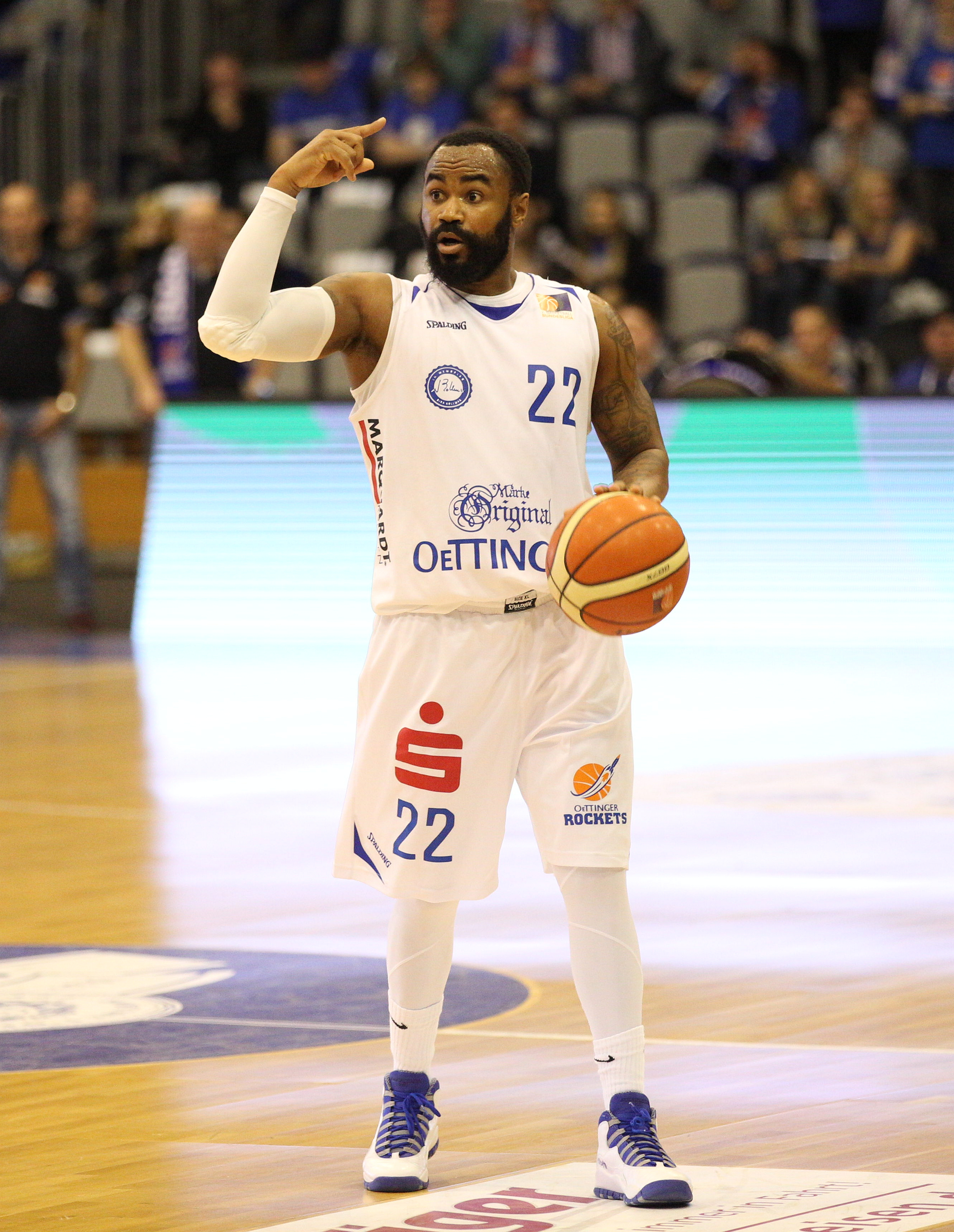
- Mitchell playing for Oettinger Rockets in 2017

Personal information
- Born: May 3, 1984 (age 42) New Iberia, Louisiana, U.S.
- Listed height: 5 ft 11 in (1.80 m)
- Listed weight: 178 lb (81 kg)

Career information
- High school: St. Martinville (St. Martinville, Louisiana)
- College: LSU (2002–2006)
- NBA draft: 2006: undrafted
- Playing career: 2006–2018
- Position: Point guard / shooting guard

Career history
- 2006–2007: Galatasaray
- 2007: Lietuvos rytas
- 2008: Élan Chalon
- 2008–2009: AEL Limassol
- 2009–2010: Khimik
- 2010–2011: Telenet Oostende
- 2011–2012: Khimik
- 2012–2013: Politekhnika-Halychyna
- 2013–2014: Donetsk
- 2014: Pieno žvaigždės
- 2014: Élan Béarnais Pau-Orthez
- 2014–2016: AS Monaco
- 2016–2018: Oettinger Rockets
- 2018: Spartak Primorye

Career highlights
- French League Cup winner (2016); French 2nd Division champion (2015); Turkish Super League All-Star (2007); Belgian league assists leader (2011); Belgian Cup winner (2010); Cypriot Cup winner (2009); Russian 2nd Division champion (2018); First-team All-SEC – Coaches (2006); Second-team All-SEC – AP (2006); Louisiana Mr. Basketball (2002)

Darrel Joseph Mitchell Jr. (born May 3, 1984) is an American former professional basketball player. He played high school basketball at St. Martinville Senior High School in St. Martinville, Louisiana, and was named Louisiana Mr. Basketball as a senior in 2002. He then played college basketball with the LSU Tigers, staying for 4 years and reaching the NCAA Tournament Final Four in 2006. After going undrafted in the 2006 NBA draft, Mitchell started a professional career in Europe with Turkish team Galatasaray. He participated in the 2007–08 Euroleague with Lithuanian team Lietuvos rytas. He has played in Belgium, Cyprus, France, Lithuania, Russia, Turkey and Ukraine.

== High school career ==
Mitchell was born in New Iberia, Louisiana and attended St. Martinville Senior High School in St. Martinville, where his father Darrel Sr. was the head coach. As a sophomore, Mitchell was named in the all-district first team after averaging 22.2 points per game. In his junior year he averaged 21 points, 3 rebounds, 5 assists and 2.4 steals per game, and he was named Class 4A MVP; he was also a first-team all-district selection, and the St. Martinville Tigers reached the quarterfinals of 4A state tournament, where they lost to Woodlawn High School in the final seconds of the game. His father won the Coach of the Year award, after the team posted a 32-3 overall record for the season. He mostly played the shooting guard position in high school, despite his 5 ft 11 in (1.80 m) frame made him undersized. Mitchell was invited to participate in the ABCD Camp, a camp for the best high school players in the US, in July 2001, the summer that preceded his senior year.

Mitchell's senior season saw average 24.6 points, 3.1 rebounds, 3.3 assists and 2.9 steals per game, shooting 41% from three. His 41-point performance against Lincoln High School of Dallas, Texas in December 2001 earned him national interest, since Lincoln was led by future NBA player Chris Bosh and was ranked the best team in high school basketball by USA Today. Mitchell won the state 4A championship with the team, which posted a 36–4 record for the season. At the end of the year Mitchell was named the 2002 Louisiana Mr. Basketball by the Louisiana Sports Writers Association (LSWA), and he was also the Gatorade Player of the Year for the state of Louisiana. In his career at St. Martinville, Mitchell scored over 2,000 career points and also performed well academically, maintaining a 3.0 GPA. In 2007, St. Martinville High School retired his jersey number, 22.

== College career ==
Mitchell was recruited by several major NCAA Division I programs such as Arkansas, Houston, LSU, NC State, Oklahoma and Virginia, among others. He signed for LSU in April 2002, choosing it over the University of Houston. Mitchell played his freshman season under coach John Brady as one of the main options off the bench: he appeared in all 32 games, averaging 19.8 minutes of playing time per game. On February 26, 2003 Mitchell shot 5/5 on three-pointers against Auburn, scoring a then career-high 19 points. He ranked 6th on the team in scoring with 7 points per game, and was the best three-point shooter with a percentage of 42.4% on 3.1 attempts per game.

In his sophomore season, Mitchell received increased playing time at 30.4 minutes per game, and started 17 of his 29 games, being advanced to the starting lineup in the second half of the season, during which he scored in double figures in 9 of his 12 final games. On February 4, 2004, in a game against Tennessee, Mitchel scored a career-high 22 points shooting 6/9 on three-pointers, and added 8 assists. Again Mitchell was the top three-point shooter on the team, taking more shots at 5.5 attempts per game, and scoring them at a 41.9% rate. He was the third best scorer on the team with an 11.9 average, behind senior Jaime Lloreda and freshman Brandon Bass.

Coach Brady named Mitchell a full-time starter in his junior season, and the guard started all of the 30 games LSU played that year. After a 18-point game on January 12 against South Carolina, Mitchell scored a new career high with 32 against Ohio State three days later. On January 18 he was named Player of the Week by the LSWA. On January 29, Mitchell scored 20 points against Mississippi State. Mitchell ended the season as the third best scorer on the team (tied with Antonio Hudson and behind Glen Davis and Brandon Bass) with 13.1 points per game. He also improved his assists average, which rose to 2.9, the second best mark on the team behind Tack Minor's 4.6 per game. He ranked 3rd in the SEC for free throw percentage with 84.6%.

In his senior year he was part of the 2005–06 LSU team which included several players from Louisiana as part of the team's starting lineup and main rotation (Glen Davis, Tasmin Mitchell, Garrett Temple, Tyrus Thomas and Darnell Lazare). On November 26, 2005 Mitchell scored a game winner against West Virginia, and reached the 1,000 points mark. On January 28, 2006 he scored 28 points against Ole Miss, followed by 27 points against Auburn on February 1, and 27 against Arkansas on February 8; he also scored the game winner against Arkansas. LSU qualified for the 2006 NCAA tournament, and Mitchell opened his tournament with 19 points against Iona on March 16. He then scored 16 against Texas A&M, and he also made the game-winning three-pointer with 3.9 seconds left in the game. After beating Duke and Texas, LSU lost to UCLA on April 1, with Mitchell scoring 8 points in 36 minutes. His 16.8 points per game for the season ranked him 4th in the SEC and second on the team behind Glen Davis. Mitchell's 1,322 minutes in 2005–06 were the 3rd best mark in a single season in LSU history. His 1,569 career points ranked 10th all-time at LSU when he retired, and he was the three-point field goals all-time leader with 258.

=== College statistics ===
Year	Team	GP	GS	MPG	FG%	3P%	FT%	RPG	APG	SPG	BPG	PPG
2002–03	LSU	32	0	19.8	.413	.424	.732	2.2	1.8	1.4	0.2	7.0
2003–04	LSU	29	17	30.4	.412	.419	.710	2.8	2.2	1.7	0.1	11.9
2004–05	LSU	30	30	35.0	.401	.364	.846	2.6	2.9	1.8	0.2	13.1
2005–06	LSU	36	36	36.7	.436	.394	.758	3.7	4.4	1.9	0.3	16.8
Career		127	83	30.6	.418	.396	.767	2.9	2.9	1.7	0.2	12.4

== Professional career ==
After graduating from LSU, Mitchell was automatically eligible for the 2006 NBA draft, where he went undrafted. He then signed with Galatasaray, a team of the Turkish Basketball League, and made his professional debut there. In the 2006–07 season he played 30 regular season games, averaging 13.8 points, 3.1 rebounds and 2.9 assists; he also appeared in 5 playoff games, where he posted averages of 13 points, 2.8 rebounds and 3.8 assists, shooting 44.4% from three. He was also named in the TBL Foreign All-Stars team. In September 2007 he joined Lietuvos rytas, a team in Vilnius, Lithuania, and he had the chance to play in the Euroleague. In the 2007–08 edition he appeared in 7 games, averaging 2.4 points, 0.3 rebounds and 0.6 assists. After being released by Rytas, Mitchell signed with French Pro A team Élan Chalon, and played 16 games in the French top league, averaging 13.5 points and 5.3 assists per game. He also appeared during the 2007–08 ULEB Cup with Chalon, and averaged 14.8 points and 7.8 assists over 4 games.

In 2008 he joined AEL Limassol in Cyprus, playing during the 2008–09 FIBA EuroChallenge. In 19 games he averaged 10.7 points and 3.7 assists while shooting 39.3% from three. He also appeared in 9 games of the Cyprus Basketball Division A. For the following season he signed for Khimik of the Ukrainian Basketball SuperLeague, and he appeared in 25 games, averaging 17.7 points and 5.4 assists, with a 3-point field goal percentage of 42.4%. He then left in April 2010 and joined B.C. Oostende, appearing in 5 games of the Belgian Pro Basketball League regular season, and then in 3 playoff games (10 points, 3.3 assists). He stayed with Oostende also for the 2010–11 season, during which he played 29 regular season games and 3 playoff games. He also took part in the 2010–11 FIBA EuroChallenge with the Belgian side.

In 2011 he signed again with Khimik, and played a full SuperLeague season (37 games, 17.1 points and 6 assists per game), and appeared with the team during the 2011–12 FIBA EuroChallenge. In 2012 he joined another Ukrainian team, Politekhnika-Halychyna, and stayed for one and a half season there. In December 2013 he transferred to Donetsk, and over 5 games he averaged 9.4 points and 3.2 assists per game. He then left Ukraine in March 2014 and signed for Pieno žvaigždės in Lithuania: he had a brief stint with the team (6 games in the LKL and 2 in the playoffs). He went back to France for the 2014–15 Pro A season: he played 7 Pro A games with the team before moving to Pro B team AS Monaco, where he ended the season: in 26 appearances he averaged 14.2 points and 5.9 assists. Monaco gained the promotion to Pro A at the end of the year, and Mitchell stayed in Monaco, playing 21 games during the 2015–16 Pro A season.

In 2016 Mitchell joined German side Oettinger Rockets: he played the first season in the ProA, the second level of German basketball (9.1 points, 3.2 assists) and the second season in the Basketball Bundesliga (11 games, 7.3 points, 3.3 assists per game). In 2018 he played 20 games in the Russian Basketball Super League 1, the second tier of Russian basketball, with Spartak Primorye, winning the league title.
