= 2010 NFL season =

American football season

Regular season
- Duration: September 9, 2010 – January 2, 2011

Playoffs
- Start date: January 8, 2011 – January 23, 2011
- AFC Champions: Pittsburgh Steelers
- NFC Champions: Green Bay Packers

Super Bowl XLV
- Date: February 6, 2011
- Site: Cowboys Stadium, Arlington, Texas
- Champions: Green Bay Packers

Pro Bowl
- Date: January 30, 2011
- Site: Aloha Stadium, Halawa, Honolulu, Hawaii

AFC teams: West, North, South, East
NFC teams: West, North, South, East

The 2010 NFL season was the 91st regular season of the National Football League (NFL) and the 45th of the Super Bowl era.

The regular season began with the NFL Kickoff game on NBC on Thursday, September 9, at the Louisiana Superdome as the New Orleans Saints, the Super Bowl XLIV champions, defeated the Minnesota Vikings.

Tom Brady, quarterback of the New England Patriots, was named NFL MVP for the 2010 season. In Super Bowl XLV, the league's championship game played at Cowboys Stadium in Arlington, Texas, the Green Bay Packers defeated the Pittsburgh Steelers 31–25 to win their fourth Super Bowl, spoiling the Steelers' chance for a seventh title. This season also marked the first full-length season in which a team with a losing record made the playoffs, when the Seattle Seahawks won the NFC West with a 7–9 record. One week later, the Seahawks dethroned the defending champion New Orleans Saints in the wild-card round, to become the first ever sub-.500 playoff team to win a postseason game.

== Labor issues ==
NFL owners voted in 2008 to opt out of their collective bargaining agreement (CBA) with the National Football League Players Association (NFLPA) as of the end of the 2010 season. (The vote was 23 in favor, 9 against; the extension measure needed 24 to pass, which would have set the CBA to expire after the 2012 season). Since a new CBA was not reached with the NFLPA, 2010 was an uncapped season, meaning that there was no salary cap or salary floor between which teams had to operate. Also, the uncapped season limited unrestricted free agency only to players with at least six years of experience, as opposed to four under a capped season. The final eight teams alive in the 2009–10 NFL playoffs (Arizona, Dallas, Minnesota and New Orleans in the NFC; and Baltimore, Indianapolis, the New York Jets and San Diego in the AFC) were restricted in the free agents they could sign.

The issue of a CBA continued into the 2011 NFL season, affecting most of the off-season.

== Player movement ==
Free agency began on March 5, 2010.

=== Free agency ===
Notable players to change teams during free agency included:

- Quarterbacks Derek Anderson (Cleveland to Arizona), David Carr (N.Y. Giants to San Francisco), Jake Delhomme (Carolina to Cleveland) and Matt Leinart (Arizona to Houston).
- Running backs Thomas Jones (N.Y. Jets to Kansas City), Chester Taylor (Minnesota to Chicago), LaDainian Tomlinson (San Diego to N.Y. Jets) and Brian Westbrook (Philadelphia to San Francisco).
- Wide receivers Nate Burleson (Seattle to Detroit), TJ Houshmandzadeh (Seattle to Baltimore) and Terrell Owens (Buffalo to Cincinnati).
- Tight ends Chris Baker (New England to Seattle), Alge Crumpler (Tennessee to New England), Brandon Manumaleuna (San Diego to Chicago) and Ben Watson (New England to Cleveland).
- Offensive tackles Flozell Adams (Dallas to Pittsburgh), Shawn Andrews (Philadelphia to N.Y. Giants), Cornell Green (Oakland to Buffalo) and Artis Hicks (Minnesota to Washington).
- Guards Alan Faneca (N.Y. Jets to Arizona), Rex Hadnot (Cleveland to Arizona) and Wade Smith (Kansas City to Houston).
- Defensive ends Alex Brown (Chicago to New Orleans), Aaron Kampman (Green Bay to Jacksonville), Julius Peppers (Carolina to Chicago), Jason Taylor (Miami to N.Y. Jets) and Kyle Vanden Bosch (Tennessee to Detroit).
- Defensive tackles Dwan Edwards (Baltimore to Buffalo), John Henderson (Jacksonville to Oakland), Ma'ake Kemoeatu (Carolina to Washington), Cory Redding (Seattle to Baltimore) and Jamal Williams (San Diego to Denver).
- Linebackers Karlos Dansby (Arizona to Miami), Larry Foote (Detroit to Pittsburgh), Scott Fujita (New Orleans to Cleveland), Joey Porter (Miami to Arizona) and Will Witherspoon (Philadelphia to Tennessee).
- Cornerbacks Phillip Buchanon (Detroit to Washington), Marlin Jackson (Indianapolis to Philadelphia), Tim Jennings (Indianapolis to Chicago), Nate Jones (Miami to Denver), Dunta Robinson (Houston to Atlanta) and Lito Sheppard (N.Y. Jets to Minnesota).
- Safeties Brodney Pool (Cleveland to N.Y. Jets) and Antrel Rolle (Arizona to N.Y. Giants).

=== Trades ===
The following notable trades were made during the 2010 league year:

- March 5: Arizona traded WR Anquan Boldin to Baltimore in exchange for Baltimore's third- and fourth-round selections in the 2010 NFL draft;
- March 5: San Diego traded CB Antonio Cromartie to the N.Y. Jets in exchange for the Jets' second-round selection in 2011;
- March 6: N.Y. Jets traded S Kerry Rhodes to Arizona in exchange for Arizona's fourth-round selection in 2010 and seventh-round selection in 2011;
- March 8: Atlanta traded CB Chris Houston to Detroit in exchange for a sixth-round selection in 2010 and conditional seventh-round selection in 2011;
- March 14: Cleveland traded DE Kamerion Wimbley to Oakland in exchange for a third-round selection in 2010;
- March 14: Cleveland traded QB Brady Quinn to Denver in exchange for RB Peyton Hillis and a sixth-round selection in 2011;
- March 16: Seattle traded DE Darryl Tapp to Philadelphia in exchange for DE Chris Clemons and a fourth-round selection in 2010;
- March 17: San Diego traded QB Charlie Whitehurst to Seattle in return for a swap of second-round selections in 2010;
- April 2: Philadelphia traded CB Sheldon Brown and LB Chris Gocong to Cleveland in exchange for DE Alex Hall and fourth- and fifth-round selections in 2010;
- April 4: Philadelphia traded QB Donovan McNabb to Washington in exchange for a second-round selection in 2010 and conditional third- or fourth-round selection in 2011;
- April 4: Pittsburgh traded CB Bryant McFadden to Arizona in exchange for a swap of fifth and sixth-round selections in 2010;
- April 5: Seattle traded G Rob Sims and a seventh-round selection to Detroit in exchange for DE Robert Henderson and a fifth-round selection in 2010;
- April 12: Pittsburgh traded WR Santonio Holmes to N.Y. Jets in exchange for a fifth-round selection in 2010;
- April 14: Denver traded WR Brandon Marshall to Miami in exchange for Miami's second-round selections in 2010 and 2011;
- April 16: Miami traded Ted Ginn Jr. to San Francisco in exchange for a fifth-round selection;
- April 19: in a three-way trade, Denver traded TE Tony Scheffler to Detroit, Detroit traded LB Ernie Sims to Philadelphia, Philadelphia sent its fifth-round selection in 2010 to Denver and Denver sent its seventh-round selection to Detroit;
- April 20: Tampa Bay traded QB Byron Leftwich to Pittsburgh in exchange for a seventh-round selection in 2010;
- April 21: St. Louis traded DT Adam Carriker to Washington in exchange for fifth- and seventh-round selections;
- April 24: Washington traded QB Jason Campbell to Oakland in exchange for a fourth-round selection in 2012;
- April 24: Tennessee traded RB LenDale White and DE Kevin Vickerson to Seattle in exchange for a fourth-round selection and swap of sixth-round selections in 2010;
- April 24: Oakland traded LB Kirk Morrison to Jacksonville in exchange for a swap of fourth- and fifth-round selections;
- May 10: Dallas traded LB Bobby Carpenter to St. Louis in exchange for OT Alex Barron;
- June 21: New Orleans traded OT Jammal Brown to Washington in exchange for a swap of third- and fourth-round selections in 2010;
- August 31: Seattle traded CB Josh Wilson to Baltimore for a conditional third- or fourth-round selections in 2011;
- September 4: Denver traded CB Alphonso Smith to Detroit in exchange for TE Dan Gronkowski;
- September 15: New England traded RB Laurence Maroney and a sixth-round selection in 2011 to Denver in exchange for a fourth-round selection;
- October 5: Buffalo traded RB Marshawn Lynch to Seattle in exchange for a fourth-round selection in 2011 and a conditional pick in 2012;
- October 6: New England traded WR Randy Moss and a seventh-round selection in 2012 to Minnesota in exchange for a third-round selection in 2011 and a seventh-round selection in 2012;
- October 11: Seattle traded WR Deion Branch to New England in exchange for a fourth-round selection in 2011;
- October 19: Kansas City traded DE Alex Magee to Tampa Bay in exchange for a fifth-round selection in 2011.

== Draft ==
The league's 75th annual selection meeting, more commonly known as the NFL draft, took place at Radio City Music Hall in New York City from April 22–24, the first time that the draft was held over three days instead of the usual two. In the draft with the first overall pick, the St. Louis Rams chose quarterback Sam Bradford from the University of Oklahoma.

== Officiating changes ==
Mike Pereira resigned as the league's Vice President of Officiating. He had led the NFL's officiating since 2001. Carl Johnson was named as Pereira's successor.

Clete Blakeman was promoted to referee, and Don Carey returned to his back judge position.

== Rule changes ==
The following rule changes were passed at the league's annual owners meeting in March:

- The overtime procedure for postseason games was changed. Instead of a straight sudden death period in which the first team to score by any method wins, the game will not immediately end if the team that receives the ball first scores a field goal on its first possession (the game will still end if they score a touchdown or if the defense scores a touchdown or safety). Instead, the other team gets a possession. If the second team on offense then scores a touchdown, it is declared the winner. If the score is tied after both teams had a possession, the rest of the overtime is played under sudden death. These changes were passed in response to recent statistics which showed that since 1994, teams that won the overtime period coin toss won 59.8 percent of the time, and won 34.4 percent of the time on the first possession on a field goal. In May, the league decided against applying these overtime rule changes to regular season games as well, although this was adopted two years later.
- The definition of a "defenseless receiver" (in which a receiver cannot be hit in the head or neck area by an opponent who launches himself and makes contact with his helmet, shoulder, or forearm) will now apply to every defenseless player.
- A play will now immediately be whistled dead if a ball carrier's helmet is removed.
- The position of the umpire has been moved from behind the defensive linebackers (except in the last two minutes of the first half, the last five minutes of the second half/overtime, and anytime the offense is inside the defense's five-yard-line) to the offensive backfield opposite the throwing arm of the quarterback in order to reduce the numerous times that the official has been run over during plays.
- During field goal and extra point attempts, defenders cannot line up directly across from the long snapper.
- Dead ball 15-yard personal fouls that are committed on the final play of either the second or fourth quarters will be assessed on the second half or overtime kickoff, respectively. Previously, such penalties during those situations were not enforced.
- Punt returners who make a fair catch signal but then muff the ball are entitled the opportunity to catch the ball before it hits the ground without interference. If there is interference during such a scenario, the receiving team is awarded the ball at the spot of the foul, but no penalty yardage is assessed.
- The 2009 temporary modification to the rules regarding balls in play that strike an object such as a video board or a guide wire has been made permanent. Prior to 2009, only the down was replayed. The 2009 modification added resetting the game clock to the time when the original play was snapped.
- The replay system will now also be allowed to cover whether there was some sort of interference with the ball during a play.
- If the clock is stopped in the final minute of either half for a replay review, but would not have stopped without the review, there will be a 10-second runoff that neither team is allowed to decline (similar to when the offensive team commits a penalty inside of one minute in order to preserve time). As with any other 10-second runoff, either team may take a time-out in lieu of the runoff.

=== Crowd noise ===
The NFL relaxed all rules regarding crowd noise, citing the need to increase the in-stadium experience to lure more fans to attend games. In addition, the league cited the advances in the coach-to-quarterback radio communications, and more visiting teams using silent snap counts as an alternative to overcome crowd noise.

The NFL's rules to "legislate the fans", and help visiting offensive players hear the snap count, have been controversial from the start. In one notorious example, then-Cincinnati Bengals head coach Sam Wyche and then-quarterback Boomer Esiason "protested" the crowd noise rules during a 1989 nationally televised preseason game against the New Orleans Saints by constantly complaining to the referee about the loud crowd noise inside the Superdome.

The league will still allow stadiums to post visual noise meters and other scoreboard messages to incite fans to make noise, but they must cease when the play clock is down to 15 seconds. However, home teams are still prohibited from pumping in artificial crowd noise.

=== Crackdown on illegal hits ===
After several violent hits throughout the NFL made the news in Week 3, the league announced that it would consider suspending players for illegal hits, such as helmet-to-helmet hits or other blows to the head. (Previously, players could only be fined for such hits.) The league also instructed all officials and referees to have an even higher level of attention toward flagrant hits. Game officials were also instructed to err on the side of safety, and throw flags even when in doubt.

The crackdown has been controversial. Many defensive players have complained that the league is being too strict in their interpretation of what constitutes an "illegal hit", and that it forces them to behave significantly differently from how they were taught to play the game. Another concern is the league's instructions to game officials to err on the side of caution, since questionable calls late in close games significantly affect their outcome. However, the medical community has supported the move, believing that it will help reduce concussions and other head injuries.

The league did not end up suspending any players for violent or illegal hits, however several players were fined for these types of hits within the first few weeks of the crackdown.

== 2010 deaths ==
- Gaines Adams: Having played for the Tampa Bay Buccaneers and Chicago Bears, Adams died on January 17, 2010.
- Elijah Alexander: Selected by the Tampa Bay Buccaneers in the 1992 NFL draft, he died on March 24, 2010.
- Bruce Alford Sr.: Selected by the Philadelphia Eagles in the 1943 NFL draft and later an official for 20 seasons (1960–79), he died on May 8, 2010.
- Johnny Bailey: A former competitor with the Chicago Bears, Bailey died on August 20, 2010, of pancreatic cancer.
- Tom Brookshier: A member of the Philadelphia Eagles 1960 NFL championship team, Brookshier died of cancer at Lankenau Medical Center on January 29, 2010. The Broadcast Pioneers of Philadelphia inducted Brookshier into their Hall of Fame in 2007.

=== Pro Football Hall of Fame ===
- George Blanda: A member of the Oakland Raiders 1967 AFL championship team, Blanda died after a "short illness" on September 27, 2010. He was 83 years old. A moment of silence was held in Blanda's honor prior to the start of the September 27, 2010, game between the Green Bay Packers and the Chicago Bears on Monday Night Football, from Soldier Field.
- Merlin Olsen: Having played from (1962–1976) for the Los Angeles Rams of the National Football League, Olsen died on March 11, 2010, at City of Hope National Medical Center in Duarte, California, at the age of 69.
- Don Coryell: Coach of the St. Louis Cardinals (1973-77) and San Diego Chargers (1978-86).

== Preseason ==
The Pro Football Hall of Fame Game was held on Sunday, August 8, 2010, at 8:00 pm EDT on NBC, with the Dallas Cowboys defeating the Cincinnati Bengals, 16–7 at Fawcett Stadium in Canton, Ohio. The remainder of the preseason game matchups were announced March 31, 2010. Highlights, among others, include the New York Giants and New York Jets facing off in the first-ever game at New Meadowlands Stadium on ESPN. The preseason game in the Bills Toronto Series featured the host Bills defeating the Indianapolis Colts in Toronto on Thursday, August 19 by a score of 34–21. Exact dates and times for most games were announced in April, shortly after the regular season games were announced.

== Regular season ==
The 2010 regular season was the first year that the league used a modified version of the scheduling formula that was first introduced in 2002, in which all teams play each other at least once every four years, and play in every other team's stadium at least once every eight years (notwithstanding the regular season games played overseas as part of the NFL International Series). Under the original 2002 formula, since the pairings were strictly based on alphabetical order, those teams scheduled to play the entire AFC West had to travel to both Oakland and San Diego in the same season, while those teams playing the entire NFC West had to make their way to both San Francisco and Seattle. In 2008, New England and the New York Jets each had to make cross-country trips to all four of the aforementioned West Coast teams. In an effort to relieve east coast teams from having to travel to the West Coast multiple times during the same season, teams will only have to visit one West Coast team (AFC West or NFC West), plus one western team from the same division closer to the Midwest, under the 2010 modified formula. Specifically, those teams traveling to Oakland (Las Vegas since 2020) will also play at Denver, while those playing at San Diego (Los Angeles Chargers area since 2017) will also play at Kansas City. For teams scheduled to play the NFC West, those traveling to San Francisco will also go to Arizona, while those scheduled to play in Seattle will then go to St. Louis (this became moot in 2016 when the Rams returned to Los Angeles in the Rams area).

For the 2010 season, the intraconference and interconference matchups are:

Intraconference

- AFC East vs. AFC North
- AFC West vs. AFC South
- NFC East vs. NFC North
- NFC West vs. NFC South

Interconference

- AFC East vs. NFC North
- AFC West vs. NFC West
- AFC North vs. NFC South
- AFC South vs. NFC East

The entire 2010 regular-season schedule was unveiled at 7:00 pm EDT on Tuesday, April 20. Additionally, schedule release shows aired on both the NFL Network and as a SportsCenter special on ESPN2.

=== Opening weekend ===
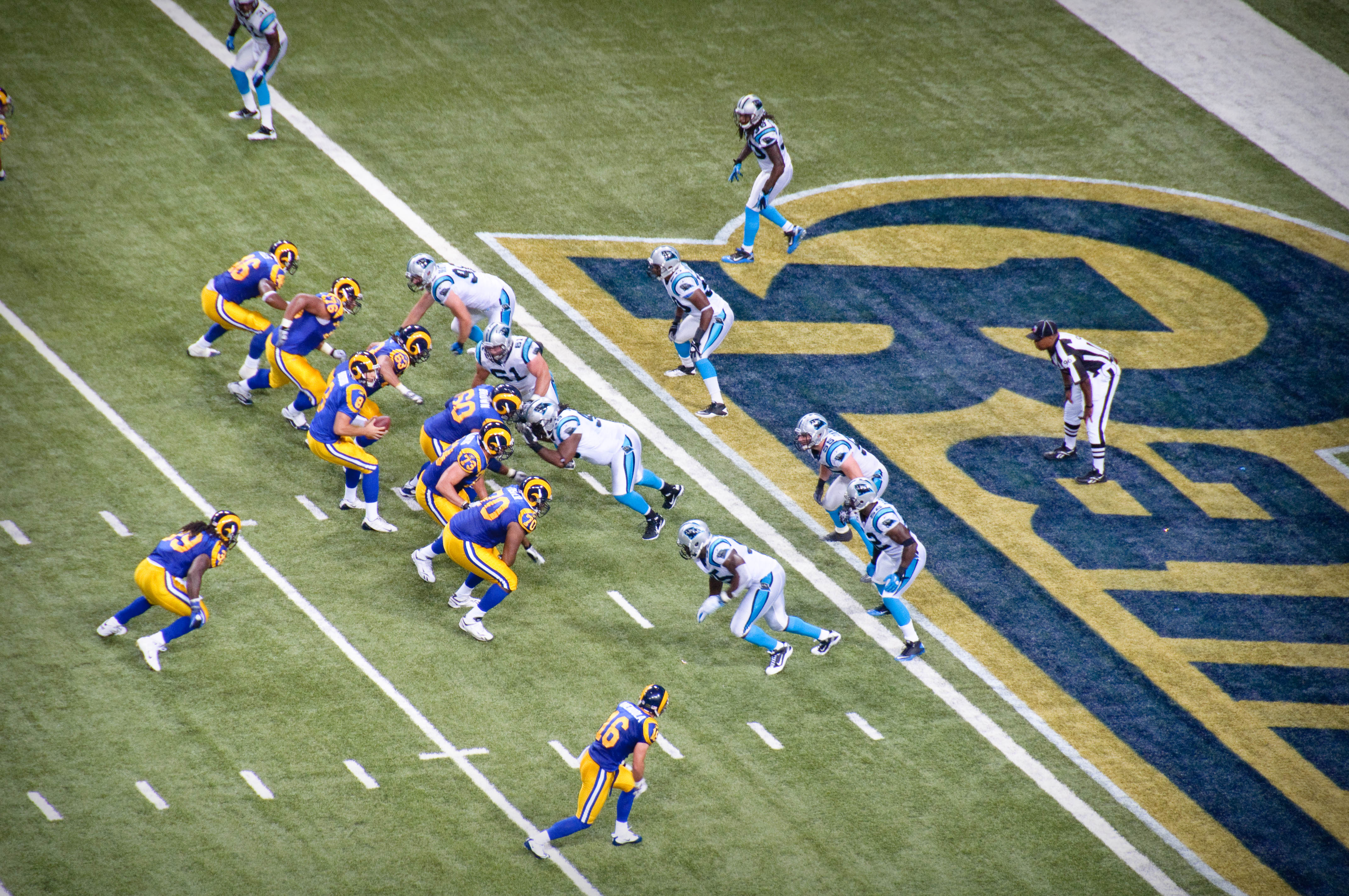
St. Louis against home to Carolina in Week 8 of the season, on October 31, 2010

The NFL Kickoff Game, the first game of the season, took place on Thursday, September 9, starting at 8:35 pm EDT, with the Super Bowl XLIV champion New Orleans Saints hosting the Minnesota Vikings, in a rematch of the 2009 NFC Championship Game, with New Orleans winning. Like in previous years, the opening week's prime-time games were expected to be announced at the NFL's annual owners meetings in late March, but that wasn't the case this year, with the schedule announced on April 20.

On March 15, the NFL announced that both the New York Giants and New York Jets would play at home during Week 1 to open New Meadowlands Stadium. The Giants played on Sunday afternoon against the Carolina Panthers and the Jets opened ESPN's Monday Night Football schedule against the Baltimore Ravens the next night. For the nightcap, the San Diego Chargers traveled to play their division rivals the Kansas City Chiefs, marking the first time that a team from outside the Mountain or Pacific Time Zones has played in, or hosted, the "late" (10:15 pm ET) game.

=== International play ===
The 2010 season featured one International game, played at Wembley Stadium in London. The teams for this game were confirmed on January 15, 2010, with the San Francisco 49ers playing host to the Denver Broncos on October 31, at 1:00 pm EDT (5:00 pm GMT), with San Francisco winning.

The following week, the third regular-season game of the Bills Toronto Series featured the Buffalo Bills hosting the Chicago Bears at Toronto's Rogers Centre on November 7 at 1 pm EST, marking the first time that the regular-season portion of the series has taken place during the Canadian Football League season and the first time an NFC opponent played in the series.

=== Sunday Night Football vs. World Series ===
On October 31, NBC aired a Sunday Night Football game, the Pittsburgh Steelers at the New Orleans Saints, against Fox's coverage of the Game 4 of the 2010 World Series, a practice the league had traditionally avoided. The Saints won this game 20–10.

=== Thanksgiving ===
As has been the case since 2006, three games were scheduled for Thursday, November 25, with the New England Patriots at the Detroit Lions and the New Orleans Saints at the Dallas Cowboys in the traditional afternoon doubleheader, and the Cincinnati Bengals at the New York Jets in primetime. The Patriots, Saints, and Jets won the games 45–24, 30–27, and 26–10 respectively.

=== Christmas ===
Christmas Day landed on a Saturday in 2010. The league scheduled one game, the Dallas Cowboys at the Arizona Cardinals that evening, airing on NFL Network. The Cardinals won the game 27–26.

=== Week 17: Division games only ===
The entire Week 17 schedule, played on January 2, consisted solely of divisional contests, in an attempt to increase competition after several cases over the last few seasons of playoff-bound teams resting their regular starters and playing their reserves. This has continued since then.

=== Scheduling changes ===
- The Philadelphia–Chicago and Tampa Bay–Baltimore games in Week 12 were moved from 1:00 pm EST to 4:15 pm EST.
- The Atlanta–Tampa Bay game in Week 13 was moved from 1:00 pm to 4:15 pm EST.
- The New England–Chicago game in Week 14 was moved from 1:00 pm to 4:15 pm EST
- The Week 14 New York Giants-Minnesota game was changed from Sunday, December 12 at 1:00 pm EST to Monday, December 13 at 8:20 pm EST because of the collapse of the Hubert H. Humphrey Metrodome's roof. (See "Stadiums" below.)
- By way of flexible scheduling, three game times were changed in Week 16: The Minnesota–Philadelphia game, originally scheduled for 1:00 pm EST on Fox, was flexed into the 8:20 pm time slot on NBC's Sunday Night Football. The originally-scheduled NBC Sunday Night game between San Diego–Cincinnati was changed to a 4:05 pm EST kickoff on CBS. The Seattle–Tampa Bay game was moved from 1:00 pm to 4:15 pm EST.
  - The Minnesota-Philadelphia game was then postponed to Tuesday, December 28 at 8 pm due to public safety concerns resulting from an anticipated snowstorm in Philadelphia, even though no snow had fallen at the time of the postponement. The resulting game was the first Tuesday NFL game since 1946.
- By way of flexible scheduling, the following Week 17 games were changed: The St. Louis-Seattle game, originally scheduled at 4:15 pm EST, was moved onto Sunday Night Football. Also, the Jacksonville-Houston, Tennessee-Indianapolis, Chicago-Green Bay, Dallas-Philadelphia and New York Giants-Washington matches were all rescheduled from 1:00 pm to the 4:15 pm slot. Except for Cowboys-Eagles, all these games carried playoff implications. (Per its flexible scheduling rules for Week 17, the league had to commit to move these games a full six days in advance before the aforementioned Week 16 Vikings-Eagles game eventually played out on that Tuesday night. Had Philadelphia won that game instead of Minnesota, they would have still been in contention for a first round playoff bye.)

== Regular season standings ==
=== Division ===
AFC East
| | W | L | T | PCT | DIV | CONF | PF | PA | STK |
|---|---|---|---|---|---|---|---|---|---|
| ^{(1)} New England Patriots | 14 | 2 | 0 | .875 | 5–1 | 10–2 | 518 | 313 | W8 |
| ^{(6)} New York Jets | 11 | 5 | 0 | .688 | 4–2 | 9–3 | 367 | 304 | W1 |
| Miami Dolphins | 7 | 9 | 0 | .438 | 2–4 | 5–7 | 273 | 333 | L3 |
| Buffalo Bills | 4 | 12 | 0 | .250 | 1–5 | 3–9 | 283 | 425 | L2 |

AFC North
| | W | L | T | PCT | DIV | CONF | PF | PA | STK |
|---|---|---|---|---|---|---|---|---|---|
| ^{(2)} Pittsburgh Steelers | 12 | 4 | 0 | .750 | 5–1 | 9–3 | 375 | 232 | W2 |
| ^{(5)} Baltimore Ravens | 12 | 4 | 0 | .750 | 4–2 | 9–3 | 357 | 270 | W4 |
| Cleveland Browns | 5 | 11 | 0 | .313 | 1–5 | 3–9 | 271 | 332 | L4 |
| Cincinnati Bengals | 4 | 12 | 0 | .250 | 2–4 | 3–9 | 322 | 395 | L1 |

AFC South
| | W | L | T | PCT | DIV | CONF | PF | PA | STK |
|---|---|---|---|---|---|---|---|---|---|
| ^{(3)} Indianapolis Colts | 10 | 6 | 0 | .625 | 4–2 | 8–4 | 435 | 388 | W4 |
| Jacksonville Jaguars | 8 | 8 | 0 | .500 | 3–3 | 7–5 | 353 | 419 | L3 |
| Houston Texans | 6 | 10 | 0 | .375 | 3–3 | 4–8 | 390 | 427 | W1 |
| Tennessee Titans | 6 | 10 | 0 | .375 | 2–4 | 3–9 | 356 | 339 | L2 |

AFC West
| | W | L | T | PCT | DIV | CONF | PF | PA | STK |
|---|---|---|---|---|---|---|---|---|---|
| ^{(4)} Kansas City Chiefs | 10 | 6 | 0 | .625 | 2–4 | 6–6 | 366 | 326 | L1 |
| San Diego Chargers | 9 | 7 | 0 | .563 | 3–3 | 7–5 | 441 | 322 | W1 |
| Oakland Raiders | 8 | 8 | 0 | .500 | 6–0 | 6–6 | 410 | 371 | W1 |
| Denver Broncos | 4 | 12 | 0 | .250 | 1–5 | 3–9 | 344 | 471 | L1 |

NFC East
| | W | L | T | PCT | DIV | CONF | PF | PA | STK |
|---|---|---|---|---|---|---|---|---|---|
| ^{(3)} Philadelphia Eagles | 10 | 6 | 0 | .625 | 4–2 | 7–5 | 439 | 377 | L2 |
| New York Giants | 10 | 6 | 0 | .625 | 3–3 | 8–4 | 394 | 347 | W1 |
| Dallas Cowboys | 6 | 10 | 0 | .375 | 3–3 | 4–8 | 394 | 436 | W1 |
| Washington Redskins | 6 | 10 | 0 | .375 | 2–4 | 4–8 | 302 | 377 | L1 |

NFC North
| | W | L | T | PCT | DIV | CONF | PF | PA | STK |
|---|---|---|---|---|---|---|---|---|---|
| ^{(2)} Chicago Bears | 11 | 5 | 0 | .688 | 5–1 | 8–4 | 334 | 286 | L1 |
| ^{(6)} Green Bay Packers | 10 | 6 | 0 | .625 | 4–2 | 8–4 | 388 | 240 | W2 |
| Detroit Lions | 6 | 10 | 0 | .375 | 2–4 | 5–7 | 362 | 369 | W4 |
| Minnesota Vikings | 6 | 10 | 0 | .375 | 1–5 | 5–7 | 281 | 348 | L1 |

NFC South
| | W | L | T | PCT | DIV | CONF | PF | PA | STK |
|---|---|---|---|---|---|---|---|---|---|
| ^{(1)} Atlanta Falcons | 13 | 3 | 0 | .813 | 5–1 | 10–2 | 414 | 288 | W1 |
| ^{(5)} New Orleans Saints | 11 | 5 | 0 | .688 | 4–2 | 9–3 | 384 | 307 | L1 |
| Tampa Bay Buccaneers | 10 | 6 | 0 | .625 | 3–3 | 8–4 | 341 | 318 | W2 |
| Carolina Panthers | 2 | 14 | 0 | .125 | 0–6 | 2–10 | 196 | 408 | L2 |

NFC West
| | W | L | T | PCT | DIV | CONF | PF | PA | STK |
|---|---|---|---|---|---|---|---|---|---|
| ^{(4)} Seattle Seahawks | 7 | 9 | 0 | .438 | 4–2 | 6–6 | 310 | 407 | W1 |
| St. Louis Rams | 7 | 9 | 0 | .438 | 3–3 | 5–7 | 289 | 328 | L1 |
| San Francisco 49ers | 6 | 10 | 0 | .375 | 4–2 | 4–8 | 305 | 346 | W1 |
| Arizona Cardinals | 5 | 11 | 0 | .313 | 1–5 | 3–9 | 289 | 434 | L1 |

=== Conference ===
AFC
| # | Team | Division | W | L | T | PCT | DIV | CONF | SOS | SOV | STK |
|---|---|---|---|---|---|---|---|---|---|---|---|
Division winners
| 1 | New England Patriots | East | 14 | 2 | 0 | .875 | 5–1 | 10–2 | .504 | .504 | W8 |
| 2 (Note: Pittsburgh clinched the AFC North title instead of Baltimore based on division record (5–1 to Baltimore's 4–2).) | Pittsburgh Steelers | North | 12 | 4 | 0 | .750 | 5–1 | 9–3 | .500 | .417 | W2 |
| 3 (Note: Indianapolis clinched the AFC No. 3 seed instead of Kansas City based on a head-to-head victory.) | Indianapolis Colts | South | 10 | 6 | 0 | .625 | 4–2 | 8–4 | .473 | .425 | W4 |
| 4 | Kansas City Chiefs | West | 10 | 6 | 0 | .625 | 2–4 | 6–6 | .414 | .381 | L1 |
Wild cards
| 5 | Baltimore Ravens | North | 12 | 4 | 0 | .750 | 4–2 | 9–3 | .484 | .422 | W4 |
| 6 | New York Jets | East | 11 | 5 | 0 | .688 | 4–2 | 9–3 | .492 | .409 | W1 |
Did not qualify for the postseason
| 7 | San Diego Chargers | West | 9 | 7 | 0 | .563 | 3–3 | 7–5 | .457 | .410 | W1 |
| 8 (Note: Jacksonville finished ahead of Oakland based on head-to-head victory.) | Jacksonville Jaguars | South | 8 | 8 | 0 | .500 | 3–3 | 7–5 | .453 | .383 | L3 |
| 9 | Oakland Raiders | West | 8 | 8 | 0 | .500 | 6–0 | 6–6 | .469 | .469 | W1 |
| 10 | Miami Dolphins | East | 7 | 9 | 0 | .438 | 2–4 | 5–7 | .539 | .438 | L3 |
| 11 (Note: Houston finished ahead of Tennessee in the AFC South based on division record (3–3 to Tennessee's 2–4).) | Houston Texans | South | 6 | 10 | 0 | .375 | 3–3 | 5–7 | .523 | .500 | W1 |
| 12 | Tennessee Titans | South | 6 | 10 | 0 | .375 | 2–4 | 3–9 | .508 | .500 | L2 |
| 13 | Cleveland Browns | North | 5 | 11 | 0 | .313 | 1–5 | 3–9 | .570 | .475 | L4 |
| 14 (Note: Denver finished ahead of Buffalo and Cincinnati based on strength of victory.) | Denver Broncos | West | 4 | 12 | 0 | .250 | 1–5 | 3–9 | .516 | .453 | L1 |
| 15 (Note: Buffalo finished ahead of Cincinnati based on head-to-head victory.) | Buffalo Bills | East | 4 | 12 | 0 | .250 | 1–5 | 3–9 | .578 | .344 | L2 |
| 16 | Cincinnati Bengals | North | 4 | 12 | 0 | .250 | 2–4 | 3–9 | .582 | .438 | L1 |
Tiebreakers (Note: When breaking ties for three or more teams under the NFL's rules, they are first broken within divisions, then comparing only the highest ranked remaining team from each division.)

NFC
| # | Team | Division | W | L | T | PCT | DIV | CONF | SOS | SOV | STK |
|---|---|---|---|---|---|---|---|---|---|---|---|
Division winners
| 1 | Atlanta Falcons | South | 13 | 3 | 0 | .813 | 5–1 | 10–2 | .484 | .438 | W1 |
| 2 | Chicago Bears | North | 11 | 5 | 0 | .688 | 5–1 | 8–4 | .473 | .420 | L1 |
| 3 (Note: Philadelphia clinched the NFC East title based on a head-to-head sweep over the NY Giants.) | Philadelphia Eagles | East | 10 | 6 | 0 | .625 | 4–2 | 7–5 | .492 | .506 | L2 |
| 4 (Note: Seattle clinched the NFC West title instead of St. Louis based on division record (4–2 to St. Louis' 3–3).) | Seattle Seahawks | West | 7 | 9 | 0 | .438 | 4–2 | 6–6 | .484 | .402 | W1 |
Wild cards
| 5 | New Orleans Saints | South | 11 | 5 | 0 | .688 | 4–2 | 9–3 | .469 | .426 | L1 |
| 6 (Note: Green Bay clinched the NFC No. 6 seed based on better strength of victory (.475) than the NY Giants (.400) and Tampa Bay (.344).) | Green Bay Packers | North | 10 | 6 | 0 | .625 | 4–2 | 8–4 | .520 | .475 | W2 |
Did not qualify for the postseason
| 7 | New York Giants | East | 10 | 6 | 0 | .625 | 3–3 | 8–4 | .453 | .400 | W1 |
| 8 | Tampa Bay Buccaneers | South | 10 | 6 | 0 | .625 | 3–3 | 8–4 | .477 | .344 | W2 |
| 9 | St. Louis Rams | West | 7 | 9 | 0 | .438 | 3–3 | 5–7 | .449 | .348 | L1 |
| 10 (Note: Detroit and Minnesota finished ahead of San Francisco, Dallas and Washington based on conference record (5–7 to 4–8).) (Note: Detroit finished ahead of Minnesota in the NFC North based on division record (2–4 to Minnesota's 1–5).) | Detroit Lions | North | 6 | 10 | 0 | .375 | 2–4 | 5–7 | .543 | .479 | W4 |
| 11 | Minnesota Vikings | North | 6 | 10 | 0 | .375 | 1–5 | 5–7 | .539 | .385 | L1 |
| 12 (Note: San Francisco finished ahead of Dallas based on record versus common opponents (2–3 versus Dallas’ 1–4 against Philadelphia, New Orleans, Green Bay and Arizona).) | San Francisco 49ers | West | 6 | 10 | 0 | .375 | 4–2 | 4–8 | .488 | .375 | W1 |
| 13 (Note: Dallas finished ahead of Washington in the NFC East based on division record (3–3 to Washington's 2–4).) | Dallas Cowboys | East | 6 | 10 | 0 | .375 | 3–3 | 4–8 | .512 | .500 | W1 |
| 14 | Washington Redskins | East | 6 | 10 | 0 | .375 | 2–4 | 4–8 | .516 | .531 | L1 |
| 15 | Arizona Cardinals | West | 5 | 11 | 0 | .313 | 1–5 | 3–9 | .465 | .450 | L1 |
| 16 | Carolina Panthers | South | 2 | 14 | 0 | .125 | 0–6 | 2–10 | .574 | .344 | L2 |
Tiebreakers (Note: When breaking ties for three or more teams under the NFL's rules, they are first broken within divisions, then comparing only the highest-ranked remaining team from each division.)

== Postseason ==
The 2010–11 NFL playoff tournament began January 8–9, 2011 with wild card weekend. Following that, the divisional playoffs set the matchups for the NFC Championship Game, to be played at 3:00 pm EST on January 23, and the AFC Championship Game, to be played at 6:30 pm EST.

After a backlash from players and critics about the previous season's Pro Bowl being played at Sun Life Stadium in Miami Gardens, Florida, in the contiguous United States, the 2011 Pro Bowl was played at Aloha Stadium in Halawa, Honolulu, Hawaiʻi. The date was January 30, 2011, the week before the Super Bowl. An NFL spokesman stated that "Plans for future Pro Bowls are not final." Indianapolis Colts President Bill Polian has stated his objections to the format, and is in favor of returning the game to after the Super Bowl as in previous years.

The annual Pro Bowl had previously been played in Hawaii for 30 consecutive seasons from 1980 to 2009. However, the NFL and State of Hawaiʻi officials only agreed to a two-year deal to hold the Pro Bowl at Aloha Stadium in 2011 and 2012. This gives the option of playing the Pro Bowl in Hawaiʻi on a rotational basis with the mainland, so it both maintains the traditional ties of holding it on the islands and providing accessibility to fans when played in the contiguous 48 states.

Super Bowl XLV, was held at Cowboys Stadium in Arlington, Texas, on February 6, 2011, and was the NFL's final event of the 2010 season.

Within each conference, the four division winners and the top two non-division winners with the best overall regular season records) qualified for the playoffs. The four division winners are seeded 1–4 based on their overall won-lost-tied record, and the wild card teams are seeded 5–6. The NFL does not use a fixed bracket playoff system, and there are no restrictions regarding teams from the same division matching up in any round. In the first round, dubbed the wild-card playoffs or wild-card weekend, the third-seeded division winner hosts the sixth-seed wild card, and the fourth seed hosts the fifth. The 1 and 2 seeds from each conference received a first-round bye. In the second round, the divisional playoffs, the number 1 seed hosts the worst-surviving seed from the first round (seed 4, 5, or 6), while the number 2 seed will play the other team (seed 3, 4, or 5). The two surviving teams from each conference's divisional playoff games met in the respective AFC and NFC Conference Championship games, hosted by the higher seed. Although the Super Bowl, the championship round of the playoffs, is played at a neutral site, the designated home team is based on an annual rotation by conference.

Playoff seeds
| Seed | AFC | NFC |
|---|---|---|
| 1 | New England Patriots (East winner) | Atlanta Falcons (South winner) |
| 2 | Pittsburgh Steelers (North winner) | Chicago Bears (North winner) |
| 3 | Indianapolis Colts (South winner) | Philadelphia Eagles (East winner) |
| 4 | Kansas City Chiefs (West winner) | Seattle Seahawks (West winner) |
| 5 | Baltimore Ravens (wild card) | New Orleans Saints (wild card) |
| 6 | New York Jets (wild card) | Green Bay Packers (wild card) |

=== Playoffs bracket ===
Jan 8 – Lucas Oil Stadium | Jan 16 – Gillette Stadium
6 | NY Jets | 17
6 | NY Jets | 28
3 | Indianapolis | 16 | Jan 23 – Heinz Field
1 | New England | 21
AFC
Jan 9 – Arrowhead Stadium | 6 | NY Jets | 19
Jan 15 – Heinz Field
2 | Pittsburgh | 24
5 | Baltimore | 30 | AFC Championship
5 | Baltimore | 24
4 | Kansas City | 7 | Feb 6 – Cowboys Stadium
2 | Pittsburgh | 31
Wild-card round
Divisional round
Jan 9 – Lincoln Financial Field | A2 | Pittsburgh | 25
Jan 15 – Georgia Dome
N6 | Green Bay | 31
6 | Green Bay | 21 | Super Bowl XLV
6 | Green Bay | 48
3 | Philadelphia | 16 | Jan 23 – Soldier Field
1 | Atlanta | 21
NFC
Jan 8 – Qwest Field | 6 | Green Bay | 21
Jan 16 – Soldier Field
2 | Chicago | 14
5 | New Orleans | 36 | NFC Championship
4 | Seattle | 24
4 | Seattle | 41
2 | Chicago | 35

== Super Bowl and conference logo, trophy changes ==
Starting with Super Bowl XLV, the template of all Super Bowl logos will virtually remain the same. The only differences from year to year will be the stadium backdrop and the Roman numerals for the game as well as colors of the area. For Super Bowl XLV, Cowboys Stadium is featured and "XLV" signifying the forty-fifth Super Bowl game.

The NFL also introduced new Lamar Hunt and George Halas trophies for the AFC and NFC Championship games. The trophies were changed from a brown base with an 'A' or 'N' on top of it surrounded by players layered on a frieze upon a wall, to silver trophies in the make of a football. Additionally, both the NFC and AFC logos were revamped and recolored to reflect the current shield adopted two years earlier and with four stars running down the inside on both logos top to bottom from left to right instead of the six surrounding the AFC and three down the side of the NFC logo as each conference has four divisions. In addition, all event and playoff logos have undergone a complete makeover in a new logo system.

== Records and milestones ==
=== Records ===
Passing

- Consecutive passes without an interception: 335, Tom Brady (Bernie Kosar, 308)
- Consecutive games with no interceptions, 2+ touchdowns: 9, Tom Brady (Don Meredith, 6)

Starts

- Consecutive starts by a quarterback: 297, Brett Favre
- Consecutive starts to start a career: 208, Peyton Manning (Gene Upshaw)

Turnovers

- Number of times sacked, career: 525, Brett Favre (John Elway, 516)
- Fumbles, career: 166, Brett Favre (Warren Moon, 161)
- Fewest turnovers by a team, season: 10, New England Patriots
- Most consecutive games without a turnover, 7, New England Patriots
- Most touchdown, fumbles recovered, own and opponents', season, 7, Arizona Cardinals (3 own, 4 opp)
- Most touchdown, own fumbles recovered, season, 3, Arizona Cardinals
- Most touchdown, opponents' fumbles recovered, season, 4, Arizona Cardinals

Special teams

- Kicks returned for touchdowns, career: 14, Devin Hester (Brian Mitchell, 13)
- Most touchdown, kickoff returns, team, game, 2 (tied), Seattle Seahawks (vs San Diego Chargers), September 26, 2010

Sacks

- Most sacks, single team, half, 9, New York Giants (vs Chicago Bears)
- Most combined sacks (both teams), half, 11, New York Giants (9) vs Chicago Bears (2), October 3, 2010

Playoff records

- Worst record to make the playoffs: 7–9, 2010 Seattle Seahawks (1982 Cleveland Browns and 1982 Detroit Lions, 4–5)
- Most playoff games won, all-time (tie): 33, Pittsburgh Steelers
- Most consecutive playoff games lost: 7, Kansas City Chiefs
- Team with the worst record to win 3 postseason games on the road, 10–6 (tied), Green Bay Packers

=== All-time records set or tied ===
- Most Super Bowl appearances, all-time, 8, Pittsburgh Steelers
- Most league championships, all-time, 13, Green Bay Packers
- Longest home game losing streak, 14 games, St. Louis Rams (2008–2010)
- Longest road game losing streak, 26 games, Detroit Lions (2007–2010)

=== Milestones and firsts ===
- Brett Favre became the first quarterback to throw for 70,000 career yards.
- Brett Favre became the first quarterback to throw for 500 career touchdowns.
- Brett Favre became the first quarterback to attempt 10,000 career passes.
- Brett Favre became the second non-kicker to play in 300 games (first was Jerry Rice).
- DeSean Jackson became the first player in NFL history to win a game by scoring on a punt return as time expired.
- The Oakland Raiders became the first team since the 1970 AFL–NFL merger to go unbeaten in their division and miss the playoffs.
- The Seattle Seahawks became the first team to win a division with a losing record (7–9).
- The Seattle Seahawks became the first team to win a playoff game with a losing record.
- Defensive end Osi Umenyiora set the NFL record for forced fumbles in a season, with 10.
- The Green Bay Packers became the first team since the 1962 Detroit Lions to never trail a single game by more than 7 points at any time.
- The Tampa Bay Buccaneers became the first team since the merger to start 10 rookies and still complete a winning season (10–6). However, the Buccaneers missed the playoffs.

== Regular season statistical leaders ==
Individual
| Scoring leader | David Akers, Philadelphia (143) |
| Touchdowns | Arian Foster, Houston (18 TDs) |
| Most field goals made | Josh Brown, St. Louis and Sebastian Janikowski, Oakland (33 FGs) |
| Rushing | Arian Foster, Houston (1,616 yards) |
| Passer rating | Tom Brady, New England (111.0 rating) |
| Passing touchdowns | Tom Brady, New England (36 TDs) |
| Passing yards | Philip Rivers, San Diego (4,710 yards) |
| Pass receptions | Roddy White, Atlanta (115 catches) |
| Pass receiving yards | Brandon Lloyd, Denver (1,448 yards) |
| Combined tackles | Jerod Mayo, New England (175 tackles) |
| Interceptions | Ed Reed, Baltimore (8) |
| Punting | Donnie Jones, St. Louis (4,276 yards, 45.5 average yards) |
| Sacks | DeMarcus Ware, Dallas (15.5) |

== Awards ==
=== All-Pro team ===
The following players were named All-Pro:

Offense
| Quarterback | Tom Brady, New England |
| Running back | Arian Foster, Houston; Jamaal Charles, Kansas City; Maurice Jones-Drew, Jacksonville |
| Fullback | Vonta Leach, Houston |
| Wide receiver | Roddy White, Atlanta; Reggie Wayne, Indianapolis; Andre Johnson, Houston |
| Tight end | Jason Witten, Dallas |
| Offensive tackle | Joe Thomas, Cleveland; Jake Long, Miami |
| Offensive guard | Jahri Evans, New Orleans; Logan Mankins, New England; Chris Snee, NY Giants |
| Center | Nick Mangold, NY Jets |

Defense
| Defensive end | Julius Peppers, Chicago; John Abraham, Atlanta; Justin Tuck, NY Giants |
| Defensive tackle | Haloti Ngata, Baltimore; Ndamukong Suh, Detroit |
| Outside linebacker | Clay Matthews III, Green Bay; James Harrison, Pittsburgh; Cameron Wake, Miami |
| Inside linebacker | Jerod Mayo, New England; Patrick Willis, San Francisco |
| Cornerback | Darrelle Revis, NY Jets; Nnamdi Asomugha, Oakland; Asante Samuel, Philadelphia; Devin McCourty, New England |
| Safety | Troy Polamalu, Pittsburgh; Ed Reed, Baltimore |

Special teams
| Kicker | Billy Cundiff, Baltimore; David Akers, Philadelphia |
| Punter | Shane Lechler, Oakland |
| Kick returner | Devin Hester, Chicago; Leon Washington, Seattle |
| Punt returner | Devin Hester, Chicago |
| Special Teams | Eric Weems, Atlanta |

=== Players of the Week ===
The following were the players of the week during the 2010 season:

| Week | FedEx Air Player of the Week | FedEx Ground Player of the Week | Pepsi Rookie of the Week |
|---|---|---|---|
| 1 | QB Jay Cutler, Chicago Bears | RB Arian Foster, Houston Texans | WR Dexter McCluster, Kansas City Chiefs |
| 2 | QB Matt Schaub, Houston Texans | RB LeSean McCoy, Philadelphia Eagles | RB Jahvid Best, Detroit Lions |
| 3 | QB Michael Vick, Philadelphia Eagles | RB Adrian Peterson, Minnesota Vikings | TE Tony Moeaki, Kansas City Chiefs |
| 4 | QB Kyle Orton, Denver Broncos | RB LaDainian Tomlinson, New York Jets | QB Sam Bradford, St. Louis Rams |
| 5 | QB Shaun Hill, Detroit Lions | RB Matt Forte, Chicago Bears | QB Max Hall, Arizona Cardinals |
| 6 | QB Kevin Kolb, Philadelphia Eagles | RB Chris Ivory, New Orleans Saints | RB Chris Ivory, New Orleans Saints |
| 7 | QB Matt Ryan, Atlanta Falcons | RB Darren McFadden, Oakland Raiders | WR Dez Bryant, Dallas Cowboys |
| 8 | QB Jason Campbell, Oakland Raiders | RB Jamaal Charles, Kansas City Chiefs | DT Ndamukong Suh, Detroit Lions |
| 9 | QB Brett Favre, Minnesota Vikings | RB Peyton Hillis, Cleveland Browns | WR Jacoby Ford, Oakland Raiders |
| 10 | QB Michael Vick, Philadelphia Eagles | RB Fred Jackson, Buffalo Bills | QB Tim Tebow, Denver Broncos |
| 11 | QB Aaron Rodgers, Green Bay Packers | RB Maurice Jones-Drew, Jacksonville Jaguars | PR Bryan McCann, Dallas Cowboys |
| 12 | QB Matt Cassel, Kansas City Chiefs | RB Peyton Hillis, Cleveland Browns | QB Sam Bradford, St. Louis Rams |
| 13 | QB Aaron Rodgers, Green Bay Packers | RB Maurice Jones-Drew, Jacksonville Jaguars | LB Sean Lee, Dallas Cowboys |
| 14 | QB Tom Brady, New England Patriots | RB Darren McFadden, Oakland Raiders | TE Rob Gronkowski, New England Patriots |
| 15 | QB Michael Vick, Philadelphia Eagles | RB Ray Rice, Baltimore Ravens | TE Aaron Hernandez, New England Patriots |
| 16 | QB Josh Freeman, Tampa Bay Buccaneers | RB LeGarrette Blount, Tampa Bay Buccaneers | QB Tim Tebow, Denver Broncos |
| 17 | QB Josh Freeman, Tampa Bay Buccaneers | RB Arian Foster, Houston Texans | TE Rob Gronkowski, New England Patriots |

=== Regular season awards ===
| Award | Winner | Position | Team |
|---|---|---|---|
| AP Defensive Player of the Year | Troy Polamalu | Strong Safety | Pittsburgh Steelers |
| AP Offensive Player of the Year | Tom Brady | Quarterback | New England Patriots |
| AP Coach of the Year | Bill Belichick | Head coach | New England Patriots |
| AP Offensive Rookie of the Year | Sam Bradford | Quarterback | St. Louis Rams |
| AP Defensive Rookie of the Year | Ndamukong Suh | Defensive tackle | Detroit Lions |
| AP Comeback Player of the Year | Michael Vick | Quarterback | Philadelphia Eagles |
| AP Most Valuable Player | Tom Brady | Quarterback | New England Patriots |
| Walter Payton NFL Man of the Year | Madieu Williams | Free Safety | Minnesota Vikings |
| Pepsi Rookie of the Year | Ndamukong Suh | Defensive tackle | Detroit Lions |
| Super Bowl Most Valuable Player | Aaron Rodgers | Quarterback | Green Bay Packers |

=== Team superlatives ===
==== Offense ====
- Most points scored: New England, 518
- Fewest points scored: Carolina, 196
- Most total offensive yards: San Diego, 6,329
- Fewest total offensive yards: Carolina, 4,135
- Most total passing yards: Indianapolis, 4,609
- Fewest total passing yards: Carolina, 2,289
- Most rushing yards: Kansas City, 2,627
- Fewest rushing yards: Arizona, 1,388

==== Defense ====
- Fewest points allowed: Pittsburgh, 232
- Most points allowed: Denver, 471
- Fewest total yards allowed: San Diego, 4,345
- Most total yards allowed: Denver, 6,253
- Fewest passing yards allowed: San Diego, 2,845
- Most passing yards allowed: Houston, 4,280
- Fewest rushing yards allowed: Pittsburgh, 1,004
- Most rushing yards allowed: Buffalo, 2,714

== Head coach/front office changes ==
=== Head coach ===
Offseason

| Team | 2009 Head Coach | 2009 Interim | 2010 Head Coach | Reason for leaving | Notes |
|---|---|---|---|---|---|
| Buffalo Bills | Dick Jauron | Perry Fewell | Chan Gailey | Fired | Jauron was fired after nine games into the 2009 season after compiling a 24–33 (.421) record, including a 3–6 record at the time of his firing, in 3½ years. Fewell, the Bills' defensive coordinator, was the interim head coach for the rest of the season and went 3–4 (.429) in that capacity; he was hired to be defensive coordinator for the New York Giants January 14. Jauron was hired as defensive backs coach for the Philadelphia Eagles. Gailey, who previously served as head coach of the Dallas Cowboys from 1998–1999 and Georgia Tech from 2002 to 2007, was last seen in the NFL as the Kansas City Chiefs' offensive coordinator before Todd Haley fired him prior to the 2009 regular season, and was named the new Bills coach on January 19; he was recommended to the Bills by former Pittsburgh Steelers coach Bill Cowher, whom Gailey served under from 1994 to 1997. |
| Washington Redskins | Jim Zorn | | Mike Shanahan | Fired | Zorn, who had never had any NFL role higher than quarterbacks coach, was initially hired to be offensive coordinator for a Jim Fassel regime. Two weeks later, Zorn was named head coach. His team went out to a surprising 6–2 start in the first half of 2008, but fell dramatically afterwards. In his two seasons as the Redskins coach, Zorn's team had a 12–20 (.375) overall record. He was relieved of his duties following the completion of the 2009 season. On January 5, 2010, Shanahan, the former Super Bowl-winning head coach of Denver Broncos from 1995 to 2008, was hired as the Redskins' new coach. Zorn was hired as quarterbacks coach for the Baltimore Ravens on January 30, 2010. |
| Seattle Seahawks | Jim L. Mora | | Pete Carroll | Fired | Mora was fired after compiling a 5–11 (.313) record in his only season as head coach as the Seahawks lost the last four games of the 2009 season, being outscored 123–37. Mora wouldn't hold another coaching position until 2012, when he was hired as the head coach of UCLA and 10 years later, the UConn Huskies, both teams in the collegiate level. Carroll had spent the past eight years as the head coach of USC, having won a share of the 2003 and the outright 2004 national championships; however, many of Carroll's achievements at USC may be stricken from the record books due to improprieties involving Reggie Bush. He had previously been the head coach of the New York Jets in 1994 and New England Patriots from 1997 to 1999, with a career 33–31 record. |

In-season

| Team | 2010 Coach | Interim | Reason for leaving | Notes |
|---|---|---|---|---|
| Dallas Cowboys | Wade Phillips | Jason Garrett | Fired | Phillips, son of former NFL head coach Bum Phillips, was fired on November 8 following a 45–7 Week 9 loss against the Green Bay Packers. Garrett was their offensive coordinator and head-coach in waiting prior to being promoted. Phillips later was hired by the Houston Texans as their defensive coordinator. Garrett was named the full-time head coach January 6, four days after the season ended. |
| Minnesota Vikings | Brad Childress | Leslie Frazier | Fired | Childress was fired on November 22 following a Week 11 loss against the Green Bay Packers, 31–3. The Vikings entered week 12 with a 3–7 record, second-to-last in the NFC North. Childress also faced controversy by releasing Randy Moss without the approval of owner Zygi Wilf and lost control over the locker room. Frazier was given position full-time prior to the Vikings' regular season finale in Detroit. |
| Denver Broncos | Josh McDaniels | Eric Studesville | Fired | McDaniels was fired on December 5, following a 10–6 loss to the Kansas City Chiefs in Week 13. After a 6–0 start in the 2009 season, the Broncos lost 17 of their next 22 games, and became subject to a videotaping scandal. |
| San Francisco 49ers | Mike Singletary | Jim Tomsula | Fired | Singletary was fired on December 26, following a 25–17 loss to the St. Louis Rams in Week 16, which officially eliminated the 49ers from playoff contention. Heavily favored to win the NFC West, the 49ers instead started the 2010 season with an 0–5 record. Singletary also faced controversy by switching between starting quarterbacks Alex Smith and Troy Smith at least three different times during the season, and unsuccessfully trying to mold the team like the 1985 Chicago Bears. |

=== Front office ===
Offseason

| Team | Position | 2009 office holder | Reason for leaving | 2010 replacement | Notes |
|---|---|---|---|---|---|
| Buffalo Bills | GM | Russ Brandon | Promoted | Buddy Nix | Nix was named general manager of the Buffalo Bills on December 31, 2009, after Russ Brandon was promoted to CEO. |
| Cleveland Browns | GM | George Kokinis | Fired | Tom Heckert Jr. | On January 11, 2010, Heckert became the general manager of the Cleveland Browns, filling the position that had been vacant since Kokinis' firing in November 2009. |
| Philadelphia Eagles | GM | Tom Heckert Jr. | Left for Browns job | Howie Roseman | Roseman was named the Eagles general manager after Tom Heckert Jr. was hired by the Cleveland Browns in the same role. Like his predecessor, Roseman serves mainly in an advisory role to head coach and executive vice president of football operations Andy Reid, who has the final say in football matters. |
| San Francisco 49ers | GM | Scot McCloughan | Mutual parting of ways | Trent Baalke (de facto) | In March 2010, McCloughan and the 49ers agreed to a mutual termination of his contract, which was later revealed to be due to personal issues with alcoholism and an ongoing divorce. Baalke was chosen to lead the 49ers in the 2010 NFL draft, and was given the title of vice president of player personnel a month later. |
| Seattle Seahawks | GM | Tim Ruskell | Fired | John Schneider | The hiring of Schneider as general manager came one week after the hiring of Pete Carroll as head coach and vice president of football operations. |

== Stadiums ==
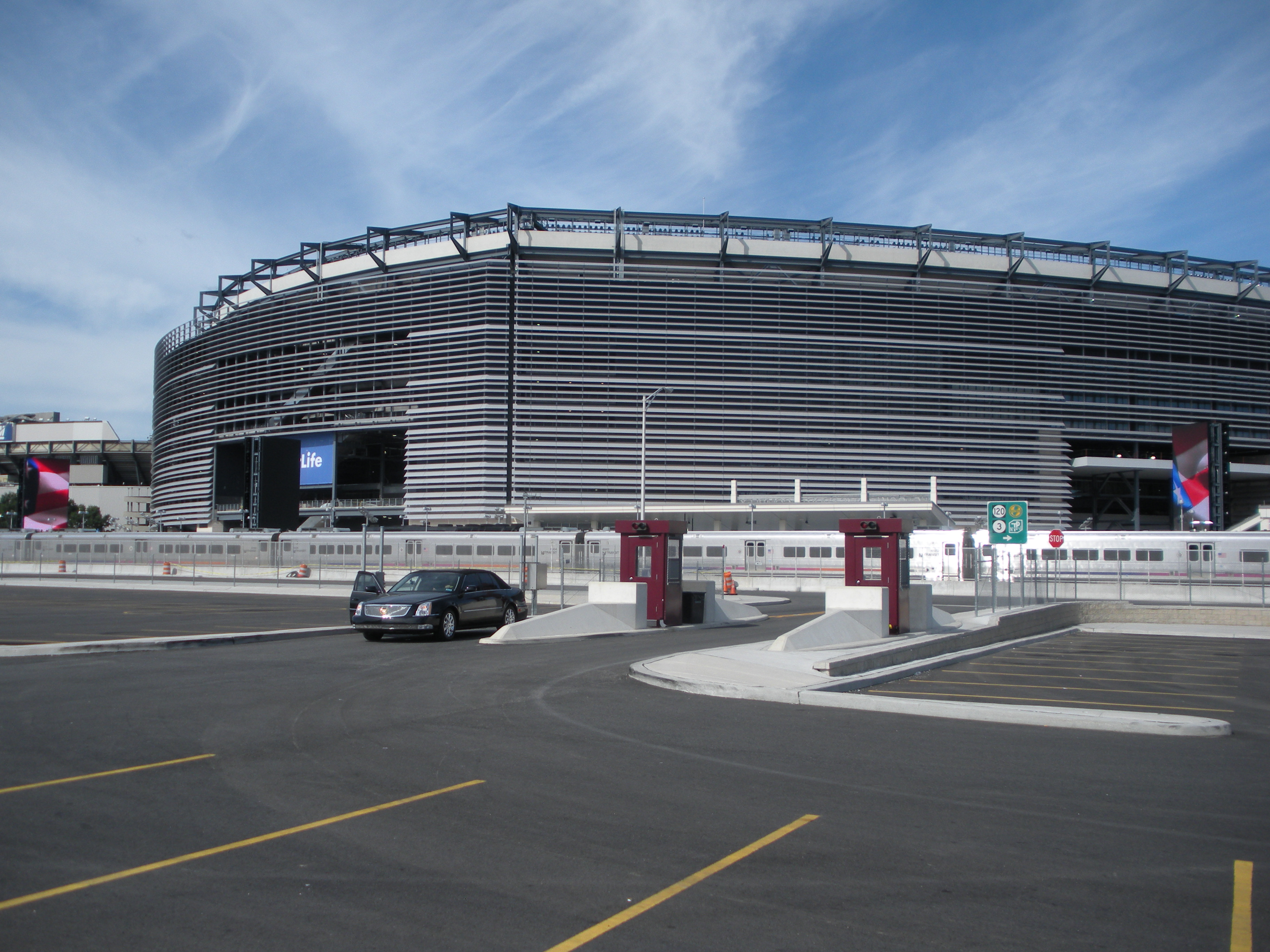
New Meadowlands Stadium

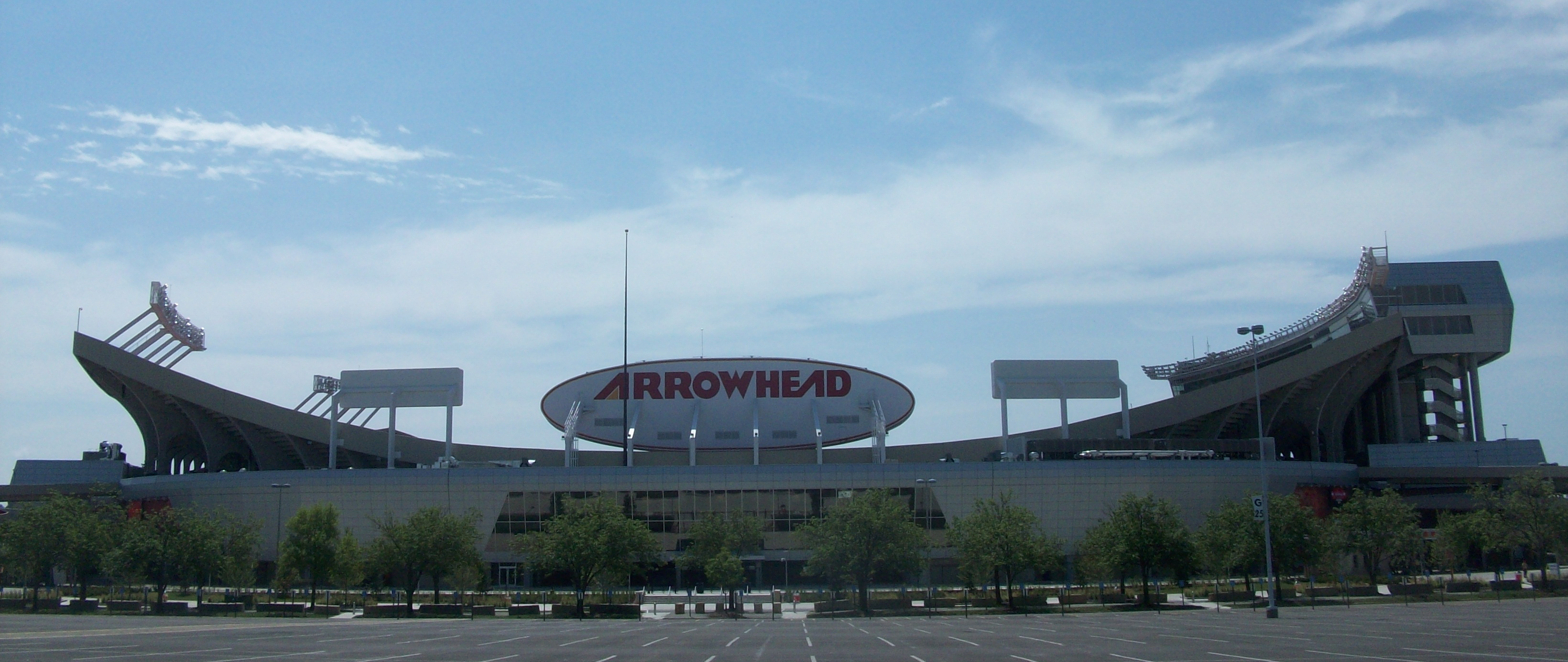
Arrowhead Stadium after renovations.

New Meadowlands Stadium opened in 2010, replacing Giants Stadium as the home of both the New York Giants and the New York Jets. The new stadium is located a few hundred feet away from the old building in the parking lot of Meadowlands Sports Complex in East Rutherford, New Jersey. Unlike Giants Stadium (in which the Giants were the sole NFL tenant until the 1984 season), the new Meadowlands Stadium will be a 50/50 partnership between both New York teams. The Giants played their first regular season game on September 12 against the Carolina Panthers, while the Jets played the following night against the Baltimore Ravens in the first game of a Monday Night Football doubleheader.

Arrowhead Stadium, home of the Kansas City Chiefs since 1972, underwent a two-year $375 million renovation project which was completed and unveiled in July 2010. The stadium hosted the second game of the Monday Night Football opening weekend doubleheader when the Chiefs played the San Diego Chargers.

M&T Bank Stadium, home of the Baltimore Ravens, installed FieldTurf prior to the 2010 season. The field had been Sportexe Momentum Turf since 2002 and grass before that.

Prior to Week 14, the inflatable roof of the Hubert H. Humphrey Metrodome, home of the Minnesota Vikings, buckled and tore as a result of heavy snowfall in Minneapolis, spilling snow onto Mall of America field and rendering the stadium unusable for the remainder of the Vikings' season. The Vikings' scheduled home game against the New York Giants was moved to Detroit's Ford Field and postponed to a 7:20 pm EST kickoff on Monday. Though stadium workers were initially "optimistic" that the roof could be repaired before the Vikings faced the Chicago Bears on December 20, stadium officials determined that such a repair was not possible in that time frame and the game was moved to TCF Bank Stadium.

Two stadiums received new naming rights: On January 20, LandShark Stadium, the home field of the Miami Dolphins, was renamed Sun Life Stadium. The Dolphins' home field, originally named Joe Robbie Stadium from 1987 to 1996, has undergone several name changes in its history, including Pro Player Stadium (1996–2005), Dolphin Stadium (2006–2009), and most recently, LandShark Stadium. On July 27, Jacksonville Municipal Stadium, the home field of the Jacksonville Jaguars, was renamed EverBank Field.

== Uniforms ==
In the 2010 season, the Washington Redskins were the only team who made a major change to their main uniforms, wearing gold pants with their burgundy jerseys, and except for a game against the Packers, wore them for home games instead of their white jerseys and red pants. The white pants were not abandoned entirely, and were worn together with the burgundy jerseys for the two away games (and one home game) in which their opponent wore white at home. This was made possible with a sleeve modification, in which the broad yellow and white stripes were severely shrunken on an elastic band (same for white jerseys) so that when wearing the gold pants, the team also wore the retro style socks that had a different stripe pattern matching the sleeves of the day, so there is no longer a stripe design conflict.

The Green Bay Packers became the first team to officially unveil a third uniform for 2010, a throwback uniform based on their 1929 uniforms when they won their first NFL championship. The throwbacks are as accurate as possible while complying with current NFL guidelines, with a brown modern-shell helmet in place of the leather helmets of 1929, along with blue jerseys and gold circles with the jersey numbers nested within the circles, and brown pants. Like throwbacks worn in recent seasons by the San Diego Chargers, Dallas Cowboys, Buffalo Bills, New York Jets, and the archrival Minnesota Vikings, these throwbacks will be a permanent addition to the Packers uniforms, unlike throwbacks worn by the Detroit Lions and Pittsburgh Steelers that were intended as one-time deals but made permanent, as well as several one-shot throwbacks in recent years. The new Packers throwbacks replace the previous throwbacks (which comprised the current helmets with the "G" logo and stripes removed, white jerseys with plain green lettering, and tan pants) worn sporadically since the early 2000s (decade).

Also going the throwback route were the Chicago Bears, who harkened back to the Sid Luckman era with a 1940s set, replacing the pumpkin orange third jerseys, and the Indianapolis Colts, who will wear 1955 throwbacks as well. Since the Colts only have two colors, they only have previously worn a throwback jersey once in their history, in 2004. The difference between the 2004 throwback and the 2010 throwback is the helmet color, which reverses the 2004 scheme.

The St. Louis Rams wore their 1999 Throwback Jerseys in Week 8 against the panthers, reminiscing on the 1995 Panthers vs Rams inaugural home game.

The Arizona Cardinals, who were the only team to not wear a third jersey in any form since the NFL allowed third jerseys in 2002, unveiled a black third jersey to be worn in 2010.

The Philadelphia Eagles have adopted their 1960 championship uniforms that were worn September 12 against the Packers, the team they beat to win their last championship in celebration of the 50th anniversary of that game.

The Tennessee Titans returned to using navy blue jerseys as their third jersey, after a one-year hiatus in which they wore light blue Houston Oilers throwback jerseys in celebration of the 50th anniversary of the American Football League, but did not wear them for any game in 2010.

The Pittsburgh Steelers wore their throwbacks against the Cleveland Browns on October 18 and against the New England Patriots on November 14.

The Seattle Seahawks have retired the neon green uniform worn for one game in 2009 against Chicago, which was in turn an offshoot from an April Fools' Day joke written about by Uni Watch founder Paul Lukas that year.

== Media ==
This was the fifth season under the television contracts with the league's television partners: CBS (all AFC Sunday afternoon away games and one Thanksgiving game), Fox (all NFC Sunday afternoon away games and one Thanksgiving game), NBC (17 Sunday night games and the kickoff game), ESPN (17 Monday night games over sixteen weeks), NFL Network (eight late-season games on Thursday and Saturday nights, including one Thanksgiving game), and DirecTV's NFL Sunday Ticket package. These contracts ran through at least 2013.

Joe Theismann joined Bob Papa and Matt Millen in a three-man booth for NFL Network, while Keith Olbermann left his position as co-host of NBC's Football Night in America.

In national radio, this is the second year on Westwood One's most recent contract extension. The network also agreed to a four-year extension on December 23, 2010.

Nielsen Ratings for the fall 2010 television season have shown viewership increases of up to 10 percent for most of the NFL's broadcast partners; eighteen of the twenty most watched television broadcasts of the season have so far been NFL games.
