= Allen Graves =

American basketball player (born 2006)

No. 22 – Toronto Raptors
- Position: Power forward
- Conference: NBA

Personal information
- Born: July 28, 2006 (age 20) Ponchatoula, Louisiana, U.S.
- Listed height: 6 ft 8 in (2.03 m)
- Listed weight: 225 lb (102 kg)

Career information
- High school: Ponchatoula (Ponchatoula, Louisiana)
- College: Santa Clara (2025–2026)
- NBA draft: 2026: 1st round, 19th overall pick
- Drafted by: Toronto Raptors
- Playing career: 2026–present

Career history
- 2026–present: Toronto Raptors

Career highlights
- WCC Freshman of the Year (2026); WCC Sixth Man of the Year (2026); First-team All-WCC (2026); WCC All-Freshman Team (2026); Louisiana Mr. Basketball (2024)
- Stats at NBA.com
- Stats at Basketball Reference

Allen Graves (born July 28, 2006) is an American basketball player for the Toronto Raptors of the National Basketball Association (NBA). He played college basketball for the Santa Clara Broncos.

== Early life and high school career ==
Graves was born on July 28, 2006, in Ponchatoula, Louisiana. He grew up playing football, but decided to commit to professional basketball as he nursed an elbow injury leading up to his tenth grade year. A growth spurt over that summer saw him grow from 6 ft 1 in (1.85 m) to 6 ft 7 in (2.01 m), resulting in him shifting from point guard to a big man role. In his sophomore year at Ponchatoula High School, Graves averaged 12 points, eight rebounds, and two assists per game as a sophomore. As a junior, Graves averaged a double-double with 20 points and 15 rebounds and led his team to a Division 1 non-select state championship title. In the championship game, he posted 23 points and 16 rebounds and was named Most Outstanding Player.

As a senior, Graves averaged 20.9 points and 12.1 rebounds, leading his team to a 30–4 record. In the state championship game, Graves posted 19 points and 20 rebounds en route to a second consecutive title. He was named the 2023–24 Gatorade Louisiana Boys Basketball Player of the Year as well as Louisiana Mr. Basketball.

== College career ==
After redshirting in 2024–25, Graves played all 35 games for Santa Clara in 2025–26. On February 7, 2026, he scored a season-high 30 points and 13 rebounds in a 96–92 win over Washington State. As a freshman, Graves averaged 11.8 points and led the team with 6.5 rebounds per game. He also tallied a total of 67 steals, tied for the most among freshmen in D-I with Tounde Yessoufou and the most by a freshman in program history. Graves was named the WCC's Freshman of the Year and Sixth Man of the Year.

On April 7, 2026, Graves declared for the 2026 NBA draft.

== Professional career ==
On June 23, 2026, Graves was selected with the 19th overall pick by the Toronto Raptors in the 2026 NBA draft. Appearing in all of the Raptors first 15 games, he played his first extended game against the Washington Wizards on November 18, recording 9 points, 4 rebounds and a block. In his first career start on November 20 against the Detroit Pistons, Graves had 20 points, 10 rebounds, and 3 steals—all career highs—for a 105–102 win.

== Career statistics ==
Legend
GP	Games played	GS	Games started	MPG	Minutes per game
FG%	Field goal percentage	3P%	3-point field goal percentage	FT%	Free throw percentage
RPG	Rebounds per game	APG	Assists per game	SPG	Steals per game
BPG	Blocks per game	PPG	Points per game	**Bold**	Career high

Year	Team	GP	GS	MPG	FG%	3P%	FT%	RPG	APG	SPG	BPG	PPG
2024–25	Santa Clara	Redshirt										
2025–26	Santa Clara	35	4	22.6	.512	.413	.750	6.5	1.8	1.9	.9	11.8

== Personal life ==
Graves' hobby since childhood is reading books, and he has an Instagram page where he posts Bible scripture videos.
