= Tasmin Mitchell =

American basketball player (born 1986)

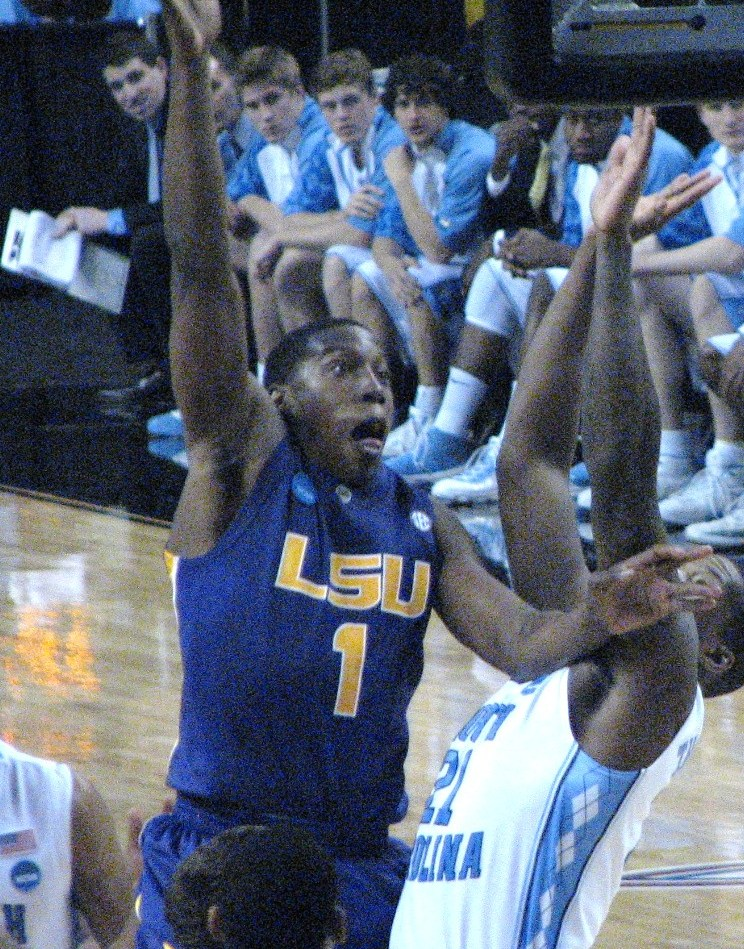

LSU Tigers
- Title: Assistant coach
- League: Southeastern Conference

Personal information
- Born: June 25, 1986 (age 40) Baton Rouge, Louisiana, U.S.
- Listed height: 6 ft 7 in (2.01 m)
- Listed weight: 245 lb (111 kg)

Career information
- High school: Denham Springs (Denham Springs, Louisiana)
- College: LSU (2005–2010)
- NBA draft: 2010: undrafted
- Playing career: 2010–2016
- Position: Small forward / power forward
- Coaching career: 2019–present

Career history

Playing
- 2010–2011: Erie BayHawks
- 2011: Quebec Kebs
- 2011–2012: Hapoel Holon
- 2012–2013: Triumph Lyubertsy
- 2013–2014: Maccabi Rishon LeZion
- 2014–2015: Champagne Châlons-Reims
- 2015–2016: JSF Nanterre

Coaching
- 2019–present: LSU (assistant)

Career highlights
- As player: Israeli league All-Star (2014); Second-team NBA D-League All-Rookie (2011); Second-team All-SEC (2010); First-team All-SEC (2009); SEC All-Freshman team (2006); McDonald's All-American (2005); First-team Parade All-American (2005); Fourth-team Parade All-American (2004); Louisiana Mr. Basketball (2005)

Tasmin Olajuwon Mitchell (born June 25, 1986) is an American basketball coach and former professional player, currently serving as an assistant coach for the LSU Tigers. A five-star prospect in high school, Mitchell had a successful career at Denham Springs High School, being named first-team All-State for four years and he was a first-team Parade All-American and McDonald's All-American after his senior season in 2005. He committed to play for LSU and he stayed with the Tigers for a total of five years, having missed one season due to injury, and reached the NCAA tournament Final Four in 2006. He ended his career at LSU in 2010 as the third-best scorer of all time with 1,989 total points. After going undrafted in the 2010 NBA draft, Mitchell played professional basketball in France, Israel and Russia.

== High school career ==
Mitchell was born in Baton Rouge, Louisiana and grew up in nearby Denham Springs, in the Livingston Parish area. Since his freshman year at Denham Springs High School, playing as a center, he gained recognition at state and national level, being selected as a first-team All-State and All-District and named Livingston Parish MVP. In 2002 ESPN named him National Freshman of the Year. He again received all-state honors in his sophomore season, and in 2003 he participated in the ABCD Camp, a camp for the best high school players in the United States, and won the Underclassmen co-MVP award with Brandon Rush after a 20-point, 12-rebound performance in the Underclassmen All-Star Game.

By his junior year in 2004, Mitchell was regarded as one of the best juniors in the nation, and one of the top players of the 2005 class. That year, basketball magazine Hoop Scoop named him the second-best player in the 2005 class behind Martell Webster and ahead of players like Lou Williams or Monta Ellis, while Rivals.com named him the no. 1 player of his class. Mitchell averaged 24 points per game in his junior season, and for the third year in a row he was selected in the All-State and All-District first team, Livingston Parish MVP, and he was also selected in the Parade All-America Fourth Team. In 2004 he also participated in the USA Basketball Men's Youth Development Festival, a camp organized by USA Basketball for the best players in the nation.

Mitchell's senior season at Denham Springs saw him average 26.9 points, 10 rebounds, 6 assists, 3.5 blocks and 2.3 steals per game, shooting 67% from the field, and he received multiple awards and honors. He was named Louisiana Mr. Basketball, Louisiana Gatorade Player of the Year, first-team All-State and All-District, Livingston Parish MVP, and he was selected in the Parade All-America First Team, being named a McDonald's All-American, an ESPN Rise All-American, and being selected to play in the 2005 Roundball Classic. In the 2005 McDonald's game, which was played in South Bend, Indiana, he scored 6 points, shooting 3-of-5 from the field, and added 1 rebound in 13 minutes of play. In the 2005 Roundball Classic Mitchell scored 17 points and had 3 assists and 1 steal playing for the West team. Rivals.com ranked Mitchell as the 20th-best player in the nation and the fourth-best small forward in the class of 2005, while other services ranked him as high as the fifth-best player in the nation: the Recruiting Services Consensus Index (RSCI) has him ranked as the eighth-best player of the 2005 class. In 2015 he was inducted in the Denham Springs High School Hall of Fame.

=== Recruiting ===
College recruiting
Name	Hometown	School	Height	Weight	Commit date
Tasmin Mitchell; SF	Denham Springs, LA	Denham Springs High School	6 ft 7 in (2.01 m)	235 lb (107 kg)	Sep 1, 2004
Tasmin Mitchell; SF	Recruit ratings: Scout: Rivals:				
Overall recruit ranking: Scout: 8 Rivals: 15
Note: In many cases, Scout, Rivals, 247Sports, On3, and ESPN may conflict in their listings of height and weight.; In these cases, the average was taken. ESPN grades are on a 100-point scale.; Sources: "LSU Commit List for 2005". Rivals.; "Men's Basketball Recruiting". Scout.; "College Basketball Recruiting Schools". ESPN.; "Scout.com Team Recruiting Rankings". Scout.; "2005 Team Ranking". Rivals.

== College career ==
Mitchell was being recruited by LSU since his junior season, and he committed to play for the Tigers in early September 2004 after narrowing his choice between LSU and Kentucky. He chose to wear jersey number 1, and as a true freshman he was selected as a starter by coach John Brady, playing 34.4 minutes per game (2nd on the team behind senior guard Darrel Mitchell): he averaged 11.4 points (4th on the team), 5.6 rebounds (3rd behind Glen Davis and Tyrus Thomas) and 2.8 assists (2nd behind Darrel Mitchell); he recorded three double-doubles during the season, and he was named SEC Freshman of the Week after recording 19 points and 12 rebounds against Southern on November 18, 2005, the first game of the season. Mitchell played 36 games in his first season (all starts), and was named Player of the Game for LSU in the losing effort against UCLA during the 2006 Final Four (12 points and 6 rebounds). At the end of the season he was named in the SEC All-Freshman team.

Mitchell was again a regular in LSU's starting lineup for his sophomore season, and played 34.1 minutes per game (3rd on his team), averaging 14.5 points (the second-leading scorer behind Glen Davis), 5.9 rebounds (again second to Davis) and 1.8 assists (4th), ranking 12th in the whole conference for scoring average and 13th for rebounding average. Mitchell's junior season ended after 3 games due to a shin fracture and ankle injury that required surgery; he was granted a medical redshirt and missed the rest of the season.

After Mitchell took his junior season off, recovering from the injury, he came back to LSU in 2008. Newly appointed coach Trent Johnson kept Mitchell in the starting five, moving him to the power forward position. Mitchell was the second-best scorer on his team behind senior guard Marcus Thornton at 16.3 points per game and was the leading rebounder with 7.2 rebounds per game. He ranked 8th in the SEC in scoring and 11th in rebounding, and shot a career-high 52.2% from the field (52.6% from three). On February 11, 2009, he scored 41 points in 49 minutes (double overtime) against Mississippi State, the first LSU player to score more than 40 points since 1995. On February 28, 2009, he scored the game winner against Kentucky, making LSU the SEC regular season winner. At the end of the season he was named in the All-SEC First Team and in the NABC All-District Second Team.

Mitchell initially declared for the 2009 NBA draft, but he later withdrew his name and decided to come back to LSU for his fifth and final season in college basketball. Before the start of the season, Andy Katz of ESPN.com included Mitchell in his list of possible John R. Wooden Award nominees for the 2009–10 season. Mitchell retained his starting role for the fifth consecutive season, and he led the team in scoring (16.8), rebounding (9.4) and steals per game (1.3). On December 14, 2009, he recorded his career high for rebounds in a game with 18 against Southeastern Louisiana; on January 20, 2010, Mitchell scored 38 points (a conference high) against Auburn. He ranked 4th in the SEC for scoring and 3rd for rebounding, and led the conference in minutes per game with a career-high 37.3. At the end of the season he was named in the All-SEC Second Team, the NABC All-District First Team, and he received the Pete Maravich Award for the best player of the state of Louisiana. His 1,989 career points rank 3rd all-time in LSU history behind Pete Maravich and Rudy Macklin, while his 950 rebounds rank him 6th all-time.

=== College statistics ===
Year	Team	GP	GS	MPG	FG%	3P%	FT%	RPG	APG	SPG	BPG	PPG
2005–06	LSU	36	36	34.4	.444	.295	.741	5.6	2.8	1.5	0.5	11.4
2006–07	LSU	32	32	34.1	.466	.376	.750	5.9	1.8	1.1	0.8	14.5
2007–08	LSU	3	3	22.0	.333	.000	.800	5.7	2.0	2.3	0.3	7.3
2008–09	LSU	35	34	32.5	.522	.526	.725	7.2	1.9	1.6	0.7	16.3
2009–10	LSU	31	31	37.3	.433	.340	.729	9.4	1.9	1.3	0.5	16.8
Career		137	136	34.2	.465	.345	.736	6.9	2.1	1.4	0.6	14.5

== Professional career ==
After the end of his last season at LSU, Mitchell was automatically eligible for the 2010 NBA draft, but he was not selected by an NBA franchise. He joined the Cleveland Cavaliers for the 2010 Las Vegas Summer League, playing 5 games (1 start) and averaging 5.8 points, 5.4 rebounds, 0.6 assists and 1.2 steals per game in 20.5 minutes of playing time. Mitchell signed with the Cavaliers on September 27, 2010, but was waived on October 13, 2010; he then joined the Erie Bayhawks of the NBA D-League. In the 2010–11 NBA Development League season Mitchell averaged 16.3 points, 5.7 rebounds and 2.3 assists per game in 33.1 minutes, starting 20 of his 50 games. He ranked first in the D-League for total fouls with 191, and at the end of the season he was selected in the All-Rookie Second Team. In March 2011 Mitchell played for the Quebec Kebs of the Premier Basketball League.

After leaving the Kebs, Mitchell signed for Hapoel Holon in the Israeli Basketball Premier League, and in 25 regular season games he averaged 14.9 points and 6.5 rebounds in 31.7 minutes per game during the 2011–12 season. His team reached the playoffs, and Mitchell averaged 16.7 points and 4.7 rebounds per game during postseason play. In 2012 Mitchell signed for Russian team Triumph Lyubertsy, and played 14 games in the Russian Basketball Super League 1 and 20 in the VTB United League. That season he also had the chance to debut in an international competition, and appeared in 12 games of the 2012–13 Eurocup, averaging 12.3 points and 3.8 rebounds per game.

In 2013 Mitchell moved back to Israel and signed for Maccabi Rishon LeZion. During the 2013–14 Super League he averaged 13.9 points and 4.9 rebounds in 29 games, and he was named a member of the International team for the 2014 Israeli All-Star game. In 2014 he left Israel for France and joined Champagne Châlons-Reims in the LNB Pro A, the top level of French basketball. In the 2014–15 Pro A season Mitchell averaged 10.8 points and 5.4 rebounds per game in 30 appearances, averaging 28.9 minutes per game. In 2015 he joined JSF Nanterre, another Pro A team, and averaged 8.4 points and 3.8 rebounds per game. He also played during the 2015–16 Eurocup, averaging 7.6 points and 3.8 rebounds per game.

== Coaching career ==
In 2017 Mitchell was named Director of Student-Athlete Development at LSU under head coach Will Wade. In May 2019 the Tigers announced his promotion to assistant coach. In 2022, Mitchell became Assistant to the Head Coach, a position he holds as of 2025.
