= Robert Henderson (American football) =

American football player (born 1983)

No. 90
- Position: Defensive end

Personal information
- Born: November 9, 1983 (age 42); Ponchatoula, Louisiana, U.S.
- Listed height: 6 ft 3 in (1.91 m)
- Listed weight: 278 lb (126 kg)

Career information
- High school: Ponchatoula (LA)
- College: Southern Mississippi
- NFL draft: 2008: 6th round, 199th overall pick

Career history
- New York Giants (2008); Jacksonville Jaguars (2009)*; Detroit Lions (2009)*; Seattle Seahawks (2010)*; Omaha Nighthawks (2010)*; Edmonton Eskimos (2011); New Orleans VooDoo (2012–2013)
- * Offseason or practice squad member only

Awards and highlights
- Second-team All-Conference USA (2006)
- Stats at Pro Football Reference

Robert Henderson (born November 9, 1983) is an American former professional football defensive end. He was selected by the New York Giants in the sixth round of the 2008 NFL draft. He played college football at Southern Mississippi.

Henderson was also a member of the Jacksonville Jaguars, Detroit Lions and Seattle Seahawks, Omaha Nighthawks, Edmonton Eskimos, and New Orleans VooDoo.

== Early life ==
He was a three-year letterwinner at Ponchatoula High School. He recorded 77 solo tackles, 43 assists, three sacks, four hurries, six pass breakups, one forced fumble, two fumble recoveries and one interception. As a running back, he finished with 41 carries, 342 yards and scored four touchdowns with a long carry of 77 yards. He was a First-team All-State and First-team All-District and also lettered in basketball.

== College career ==
He played in 46 games with 33 starts at the "Bandit" defensive end position. His career totals include 173 tackles (115 solo), 13.5 and 29.5 stops for losses and also forced 7 fumbles and recovered another and deflected 9 passes and blocked a kick. He played in the 2007 GMAC Bowl, when he forced a fumble in the win over Ohio. In 2006, he was named Second-team All-Conference USA.

== Professional career ==
Pre-draft measurables
Height	Weight	40-yard dash	10-yard split	20-yard split	20-yard shuttle	Three-cone drill	Broad jump	Bench press
6 ft 3 1/8 in (1.91 m)	278 lb (126 kg)	4.81 s	1.63 s	2.71 s	4.53 s	7.28 s	9 ft 6 in (2.90 m)	22 reps
All values from Pro Day.

=== New York Giants ===
Henderson was a sixth round (199th pick overall) draft choice by the New York Giants in the 2008 NFL draft. He injured his ankle in his NFL preseason debut and spent his entire rookie season on injured reserve. He was waived on September 5, 2009.

=== Jacksonville Jaguars ===
The Jacksonville Jaguars signed Henderson to their practice squad on September 15, 2009. He was released on September 29.

=== Detroit Lions ===
Henderson was signed to the Detroit Lions practice squad on October 14, 2009. After his practice squad contract expired, Henderson was re-signed to a future reserve contract on January 5, 2010.

=== Seattle Seahawks ===
On April 5, 2010, Henderson was traded to the Seattle Seahawks with a 2010 fifth-round draft pick for offensive lineman Rob Sims and a 2010 seventh-round draft pick.
