= Breaux Bridge High School =

School in Breaux Bridge, Louisiana, United States

Location
- 1015 Breaux Bridge High School Road; Breaux Bridge, St. Martin Parish, Louisiana, Louisiana 70517; United States; 30.2541°N 91.8581°W

Information
- Type: Public high school
- School district: St. Martin Parish School Board
- Principal: Louis Blanchard
- Staff: 45.25 (FTE)
- Enrollment: 762 (2023–2024)
- Student to teacher ratio: 16.84
- Colors: Maroon and white
- Mascot: Tiger
- Nickname: Tigers
- Yearbook: Tiger Memoirs
- Website: Breaux Bridge High School

Breaux Bridge High School (BBHS or BBSH) is a public senior high school located in Breaux Bridge, Louisiana, serving a community known as the "Crawfish Capital of the World." It is part of the St. Martin Parish School Board.

== History ==
The history of Breaux Bridge High School dates back to 1905 when the first school opened at 348 West Bridge Street. Over the ensuing decades, the campus saw significant development. In 1913, the Red Building was constructed at the corner of Main and Martin Streets, facing City Park, at a cost of $20,000, as shown in a circa 1914 photograph. In 1922, the White Building was added for $85,000. These early structures served the community until the original Breaux Bridge High School was destroyed by fire in 1975. Prior to the fire, a new school was built three miles out in the country in 1972 and was dedicated on April 21, 1974. (Courtesy Kenneth P. Delcambre.)
