= 2006 McDonald's All-American Boys Game =

American high school basketball game

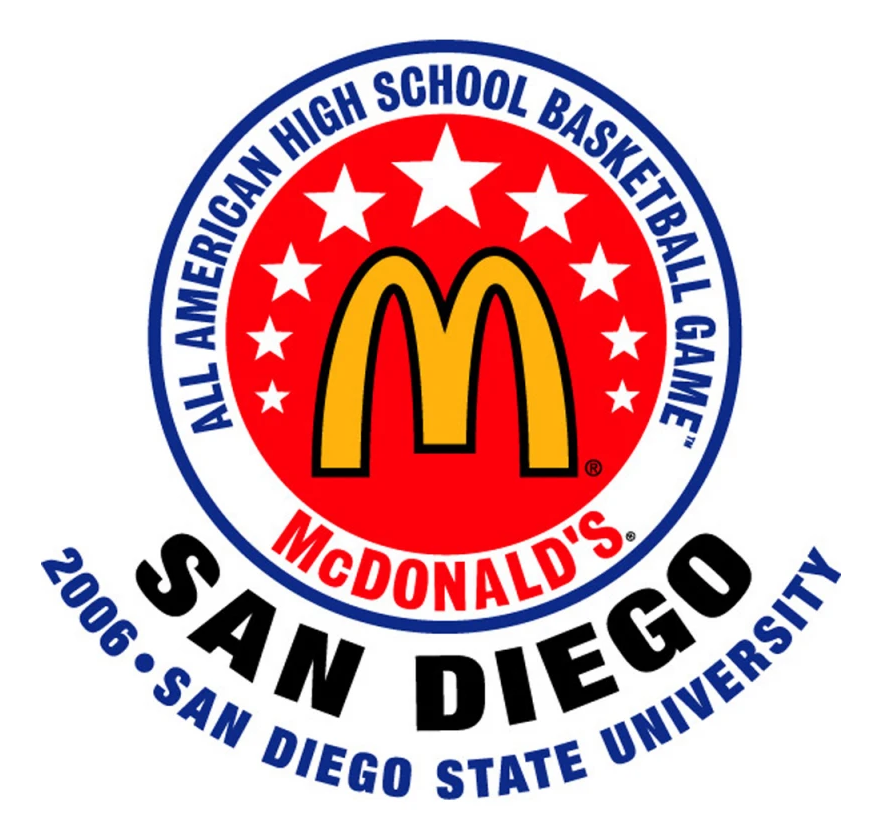
East	West
94	112
	1st half	2nd half	Total
East	55	39	94
West	48	64	112
- Date: March 29, 2006
- Venue: Cox Arena, San Diego, California
- MVP: Chase Budinger, Kevin Durant
- Referees: Mike Morrow; Mike McCarthy; Reggie Hernandez
- Attendance: 11,900
- Halftime show: Nick Cannon
- Network: ESPN

McDonald's All-American

The 2006 McDonald's All-American Boys Game was an All-star basketball game played on Wednesday, March 29, 2006 at Cox Arena in San Diego, California, home of the San Diego State University. The game's rosters featured the best and most highly recruited high school boys graduating in 2007. The game was the 29th annual version of the McDonald's All-American Game first played in 1978.

The 48 players were selected from 2,500 nominees by a committee of basketball experts. They were chosen not only for their on-court skills, but for their performances off the court as well. Coach Morgan Wootten, who had more than 1,200 wins as head basketball coach at DeMatha High School, was chairman of the selection committee. Legendary UCLA coach John Wooden, who has been involved in the McDonald's All American Games since its inception, served as chairman of the Games and as an advisor to the selection committee.

Proceeds from the 2006 McDonald's All American High School Basketball Games went to Ronald McDonald House Charities (RMHC) of San Diego and its Ronald McDonald House program.

== 2006 game ==
The game was telecast live by ESPN. The halftime performance by hip hop artist Nick Cannon took second stage to the showcase of basketball talent at the 2006 McDonald's All American Games.

A sold-out boys' game was headlined by hometown favorite and co-Most Valuable Player of the Game, Chase Budinger, who had 11 points, four assists, three steals and three rebounds. He shared the John R. Wooden Most Valuable Player Award with West-squad teammate Kevin Durant, who racked-up 25 points, five rebounds, four assists and two steals. The East Team was led by Gerald Henderson (Charlotte Bobcats) with 16 points and Thaddeus Young (Indiana Pacers) with 14 points. Morgan Wootten Player of the Year award winner and boys' East Team player Greg Oden (Portland Trail Blazers) also had a stellar game with 10 points, five rebounds and four blocks despite an injured right wrist.

The 2006 crop of McDonald's All Americans made a huge impact during their inaugural season in the NCAA, including placing three players each on the 2007 rosters of the ACC-champion North Carolina Tarheels and Big Ten-champion Ohio State Buckeyes. The Big 12 Champion-Kansas Jayhawks also had two players from this squad.

The West Team came back from being down by 20 points during the first half to win the game 112– 94. The West's victory was their first since 2001 and narrowed the series lead to 16–13 in favor of the East squad.

=== East roster ===
#	Name	Height	Weight	Position	Hometown	High school	College choice
1	Tywon Lawson	6-0	190	G	Mouth of Wilson, Virginia	Oak Hill Academy	North Carolina
2	Javaris Crittenton	6-5	195	G	Atlanta, Georgia	Southwest Atlanta Christian Academy	Georgia Tech
3	Scottie Reynolds	6-1	185	G	Herndon, Virginia	Herndon High School	Villanova
5	Earl Clark	6-9	220	F	Rahway, New Jersey	Rahway High School	Louisville
11	Mike Conley	6-1	170	G	Indianapolis, Indiana	Lawrence North High School	Ohio State
20	Lance Thomas	6-8	200	F	Scotch Plains, New Jersey	Saint Benedict's Preparatory School	Duke
21	Vernon Macklin	6-9	225	F	Chatham, Virginia	Hargrave Military Academy	Georgetown
22	Wayne Ellington	6-4	185	G	Merion Station, Pennsylvania	Episcopal Academy	North Carolina
33	Thaddeus Young	6-8	215	G	Memphis, Tennessee	Mitchell High School	Georgia Tech
34	Brandan Wright	6-9	200	F	Nashville, Tennessee	Brentwood Academy	North Carolina
43	Gerald Henderson Jr.	6-5	190	G	Merion Station, Pennsylvania	Episcopal Academy	Duke
50	Greg Oden	7-1	260	C	Indianapolis, Indiana	Lawrence North High School	Ohio State

=== West roster ===
#	Name	Height	Weight	Position	Hometown	High school	College choice
00	Darrell Arthur	6-9	220	F	Dallas, Texas	South Oak Cliff High School	Kansas
2	Demond Carter	5-11	170	G	Reserve, Louisiana	Reserve Christian School High School	Baylor
3	Kevin Durant	6-10	205	F	Rockville, Maryland	Montrose Christian School	Texas
4	Sherron Collins	5-11	195	G	Chicago, Illinois	Crane High School	Kansas
14	Daequan Cook	6-5	200	G	Dayton, Ohio	Dunbar High School	Ohio State
15	D. J. Augustin	6-0	180	G	New Orleans, Louisiana	Hightower High School	Texas
21	Robin Lopez	7-0	245	C	Fresno, California	San Joaquin High School	Stanford
22	Jon Scheyer	6-6	180	G	Northbrook, Illinois	Glenbrook North High School	Duke
30	Brook Lopez	7-0	245	C	Fresno, California	San Joaquin High School	Stanford
32	Spencer Hawes	7-0	230	C	Seattle, Washington	Seattle Preparatory School	Washington
34	Chase Budinger	6-8	200	G	Carlsbad, California	La Costa Canyon High School	Arizona
35	James Keefe	6-8	220	F	Santa Margarita, California	Santa Margarita Catholic High School	UCLA

=== Coaches ===
The East team was coached by:

- Head coach Doug Lipscomb of Wheeler High School (Marietta, Georgia)
- Asst coach Marc Carver of Wheeler High School (Marietta, Georgia)
- Asst coach Bennie Gibbs of Berkmar High School (Lilburn, Georgia)

The West team was coached by:

- Head coach Harvey Kitani of Fairfax High School (Los Angeles, California)
- Asst coach J.D. Green of Fairfax High School (Los Angeles, California)
- Asst coach Scott Ogden of Carlsbad High School (Carlsbad, California)

=== Box score ===
==== Visitors: East ====
##	Player	FGM/A	3PM/A	FTM/A	Points	Off Reb	Def Reb	Tot Reb	PF	Ast	TO	BS	ST	Min
1	*Tywon Lawson	2/ 7	0/1	0/ 0	4	0	3	3	2	5	3	0	1	19
20	*Lance Thomas	4/ 8	0/0	1/ 2	9	0	0	0	1	0	1	0	2	21
33	*Thaddeus Young	6/ 9	0/2	2/ 2	14	0	3	3	1	1	1	1	0	19
43	*Gerald Henderson Jr.	6/10	1/1	3/ 4	16	2	2	4	1	1	3	0	0	17
50	*Greg Oden	3/ 4	0/0	4/ 4	10	2	3	5	2	1	1	4	0	19
2	Javaris Crittenton	3/ 9	2/6	0/ 0	8	1	2	3	1	3	3	1	1	20
3	Scottie Reynolds	1/ 3	1/3	0/ 0	3	0	1	1	2	5	0	0	1	13
5	Earl Clark	1/ 7	0/3	2/ 2	4	3	2	5	1	1	1	2	0	16
11	Mike Conley Jr.	0/ 3	0/0	0/ 0	0	0	0	0	0	0	1	0	1	8
21	Vernon Macklin	3/ 3	0/0	0/ 0	6	5	5	10	0	2	4	0	1	16
22	Wayne Ellington	3/10	2/8	0/ 0	8	0	3	3	3	0	1	0	0	15
34	Brandan Wright	6/10	0/0	0/ 0	12	0	3	3	1	0	1	2	0	17
	Team					4	4	8						
	TOTALS	38/83	6/24	12/14	94	17	31	48	15	19	20	10	7	200

==== Home: West ====
##	Player	FGM/A	3PM/A	FTM/A	Points	Off Reb	Def Reb	Tot Reb	PF	Ast	TO	BS	ST	Min
3	*Kevin Durant	10/17	2/6	3/ 3	25	4	1	5	1	4	3	0	2	18
4	*Sherron Collins	4/ 8	1/2	2/ 3	11	1	1	2	0	3	1	1	2	16
21	*Robin Lopez	1/ 2	0/0	1/ 2	3	2	6	8	2	2	0	1	0	16
32	*Spencer Hawes	5/ 9	0/0	1/ 2	11	2	3	5	4	0	2	0	0	17
34	*Chase Budinger	5/ 8	1/4	0/ 0	11	0	3	3	0	4	1	0	3	21
00	Darrell Arthur	2/ 6	1/1	2/ 3	7	0	3	3	1	0	2	1	0	13
2	Demond Carter	0/ 3	0/2	0/ 0	0	1	1	2	1	2	0	0	0	14
14	Daequan Cook	6/13	5/9	0/ 0	17	0	0	0	1	2	0	0	1	19
15	D. J. Augustin	2/ 6	1/3	2/ 2	7	1	3	4	0	3	3	0	1	19
22	Jon Scheyer	3/ 4	2/2	1/ 2	9	1	2	3	0	4	1	0	0	15
30	Brook Lopez	2/ 3	0/0	2/ 2	6	0	5	5	1	0	1	1	3	18
35	James Keefe	1/ 6	1/3	2/ 4	5	3	0	3	1	0	1	2	1	14
	Team					2	1	3						
	TOTALS	41/85	14/32	16/23	112	17	29	46	12	24	15	6	13	200

(* = Starting line-up)

== All-American week ==
=== Schedule ===
- Tuesday, March 28: Powerade Jamfest
  - Slam Dunk Contest
  - Three-Point Shoot-out
  - Timed Basketball Skills Competition
- Wednesday, March 29: 29th Annual Boys All-American Game

The Powerade JamFest is a skills-competition evening featuring basketball players who demonstrate their skills in three crowd-entertaining ways. The slam dunk contest was first held in 1987, and a 3-point shooting challenge was added in 1989. This year, for the first time, a timed basketball skills competition was added to the schedule of events.

=== Contest winners ===
- The 2006 Powerade Slam Dunk contest was won by Gerald Henderson Jr.
- Wayne Ellington was winner of the 2006 3-point shoot-out.
- The skills competition was won by James Keefe.

== See also ==
- 2006 McDonald's All-American Girls Game
