= Tweety Carter =

American basketball player (born 1986)

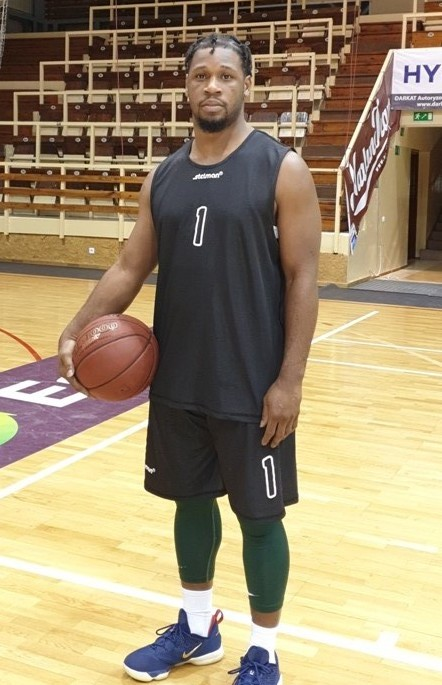
- Carter in 2019

Baylor Bears
- Title: Assistant coach
- League: Big 12 Conference

Personal information
- Born: October 25, 1986 (age 40) New Orleans, Louisiana, U.S.
- Listed height: 5 ft 11 in (1.80 m)
- Listed weight: 185 lb (84 kg)

Career information
- High school: Reserve Christian School (Reserve, Louisiana)
- College: Baylor (2006–2010)
- NBA draft: 2010: undrafted
- Playing career: 2010–2022
- Position: Point guard
- Coaching career: 2024–present

Career history

Playing
- 2010–2011: Tulsa 66ers
- 2011: Ventspils
- 2011–2012: Bnei HaSharon
- 2012: Cibona Zagreb
- 2012–2013: ČEZ Nymburk
- 2013–2014: s.Oliver Würzburg
- 2014: ASVEL
- 2014–2015: SOMB
- 2015–2016: Pieno žvaigdžės
- 2016: Boulazac Dordogne
- 2016–2017: Turów Zgorzelec
- 2017–2018: ESSM Le Portel
- 2018–2019: Kolossos Rodou
- 2019: Spójnia Stargard
- 2019–2020: Start Lublin
- 2020–2021: Benfica
- 2021–2022: Start Lublin

Coaching
- 2024–present: Baylor (assistant)

Career highlights
- McDonald's All-American (2006); Third-team Parade All-American (2006); Louisiana Mr. Basketball (2006)

Demond "Tweety" Carter (born October 25, 1986) is an American basketball coach and former professional player who is an assistant coach for the Baylor Bears. He played college basketball for Baylor from 2006 to 2010. Carter played professionally in the NBA Development League, Latvia, Israel, Croatia, the Czech Republic, Germany, France, Lithuania, Poland, Greece and Portugal. He returned to Baylor in 2022 as director of player development and was promoted to assistant coach in 2024.

== High school career ==
Tweety Carter had one of the greatest high school careers in the history of the sport while attending Reserve Christian School in Reserve, Louisiana. In six years playing varsity Carter scored 7,457 points, making him the highest scoring high school player in U.S. history, leading the Eagles to five state championships. Carter was named McDonald's All-American, Parade All-American (third team), Jordan All-American, EA Sports All-American and MaxPreps All-American following senior season in 2006. He was a 4-time MVP of the Louisiana State Tournament and named Louisiana "Mr. Basketball" in 2006.

== College career ==
Carter committed to the Baylor Bears at the beginning of his junior year in high school. At the time, Baylor was going through the murder of student-athlete Patrick Dennehy and numerous NCAA violations. He started on the 2009–2010 team that went to the Elite Eight of the NCAA tournament.

=== Freshman year ===
Carter played in all 31 games during his freshman campaign and started the final 13 for the Bears.

Year	Games Played	Minutes/Game	Points/Game	Assists/Game
2006–07	31	25.5	8.7	2.7

=== Sophomore year ===
As a sophomore, Carter played in all 32 games and started the final eight. Scored season-high 22 points on 7-of-11 shooting from the floor, including a season-best 5-of-8 from 3-point range in a win over Prairie View A&M on December 31.

Year	Games Played	Minutes/Game	Points/Game	Assists/Game
2007–08	32	25.8	9.6	2.8

=== Junior year ===
In his junior year, Carter started 36 games for the Bears. Carter scored a season high 30 points including seven 3-pointers on February 21, 2009. Carter averaged 11 points and five assists during the Bears' NIT run.

Year	Games Played	Minutes/Game	Points/Game	Assists/Game
2008–09	36	33.2	10.6	3.2

=== Senior year ===
During his senior year, Carter, along with transfer Ekpe Udoh, led Baylor to the Elite Eight and was named fourth team All-American by Sporting News Magazine. Carter scored in double figures in 23 of his 31 outings, including 14 games with 15 or more points. He also had four double-doubles.

Year	Games Played	Minutes/Game	Points/Game	Assists/Game
2009–10	31	36.2	15.1	5.9

== Professional career ==
In June 2010, Carter joined the New Jersey Nets for the Orlando Pro Summer League 2010. On September 27, 2010, the Oklahoma City Thunder invited Carter to their training camp. However, he was later waived on October 15, 2010.

On November 4, 2010, he was acquired by the Tulsa 66ers of the NBA D-League. In February 2011, he signed with BK Ventspils of Latvia for the rest of the season.

In July 2011, he signed with Bnei HaSharon of Israel for the 2011–12 season.

On August 7, 2012, he signed with Cibona Zagreb of Croatia. In November 2012, he parted ways with Cibona. In December 2012, he moved to Czech Republic and signed with ČEZ Nymburk for the rest of the season.

On August 8, 2013, Carter signed a one-year deal with s.Oliver Baskets of Germany. On January 17, 2014, he parted ways with them and signed with ASVEL Basket of France for the rest of the season.

On November 9, 2014, Carter signed with SO Maritime Boulogne of France for the rest of the 2014–15 season.

On June 11, 2017, Carter signed with ESSM Le Portel of France for the 2017–18 season.

On December 13, 2018, Carter joined Kolossos Rodou of the Greek Basket League.

On August 6, 2020, Carter joined Benfica of the Liga Portuguesa de Basquetebol. He averaged 8.5 points, 2.6 rebounds, and 4.6 assists per game.

On June 27, 2021, Carter signed with Start Lublin of the Polish Basketball League.

== Coaching career ==
Carter was named Baylor Men’s Basketball Director of Player Development on March 29, 2022, spending two seasons in that role, before being promoted to an assistant coach in May of 2024.
