= St. Martin Parish School Board =

School district in Louisiana

Saint Martin Parish School System

Location
- 600 Corporate Boulevard; Breaux Bridge, Louisiana 70517 Saint Martin Parish, Louisiana United States
- Coordinates: 30.2864°N 91.9054°W

District information
- Type: Public (government funded)
- Motto: Striving for Educational Excellence and Equal Access for all Students.
- Grades: K-12
- President: Richard Potier
- Vice-president: Steve Fuselier
- Superintendent: Frederick Wiltz

Other information
- Website: Official website

The St. Martin Parish School Board (SMPSB) is an entity responsible for the operation of public schools in St. Martin Parish, Louisiana, United States. It is headquartered in the city of St. Martinville.

== Current Superintendent of Schools ==
Frederick Wiltz is the current Superintendent of the Saint Martin Parish School District.

== Schools ==
St. Martin Parish consists of two non-contiguous areas. 16 schools are in "Upper St. Martin Parish" and one school, Stephensville Elementary School, is in "Lower St. Martin Parish." Students in Lower St. Martin Parish attend Morgan City High School in nearby St. Mary Parish upon finishing at Stephensville Elementary School.

=== High schools ===
- Grades 9-12
  - Breaux Bridge High School Breaux Bridge High School (Breaux Bridge)
  - Cecilia High School Cecilia High School (Unincorporated area cecilia)
  - St. Martinville Senior High School (St. Martinville)

=== Middle/Junior High Schools ===
- Grades 7-8
  - Breaux Bridge Junior High School (Breaux Bridge)
  - Cecilia Junior High School (Unincorporated area cecilia )
- Grades 5-8
  - Parks Middle School (Parks)
  - St. Martinville Junior High School (St. Martinville)

=== Elementary schools ===
- Grades 4-6
  - Breaux Bridge Elementary School (Breaux Bridge)
  - Teche Elementary School (Unincorporated area cecilia)
- Grades 1-4
  - St. Martinville Primary School (St. Martinville)
- Grades PK-4
  - Parks Primary School (Parks)
- Grades PK-3
  - Breaux Bridge Primary School (Breaux Bridge)
  - Cecilia Primary School (Unincorporated area cecilia )
- Grades PK-K
  - Early Learning Center (St. Martinville)

=== PK-8 Schools ===
- Catahoula Elementary School (Unincorporated area)
- Stephensville Elementary School (Unincorporated area)

=== Other Campuses ===
- JCEP (St. Martinville)
- St. Martin Parish Juvenile Center (St. Martinville)

== Current School Principals (2023-2024 School Year) ==
- Shalita Manual (Breaux Bridge Elementary School)
- Louis Blanchard (Breaux Bridge High School)
- Denise Frederick (Breaux Bridge Junior High School)
- Jill Bozeman (Breaux Bridge Primary School)
- Nicole Usie (Cecilia High School)
- Tiedra Hawkins (Cecilia Junior High School)
- Tiffany Francis (Cecilia Primary School)
- Elizabeth Thibeaux-Clay (College and Career Center)
- Jessica Landry (Early Learning Center)
- Dr. Wanda Phillips (Parks Middle School)
- Julie Laviolette (Parks Primary School)
- Dequindra Ligon (St.Martin Junior High School)
- Lisa Sylvester (St.Martinville Primary School)
- Jonathan Lane (St.Martinville Senior High School)
- Christopher Shirley (Stephensville Elementary School)
- Shelly Dupre (Teche Elementary School)
