= Ponchatoula High School =

Coordinates: 30.44074°N 90.40254°W

Location
- 19452 Highway 22 East; Ponchatoula, Tangipahoa, Louisiana 70454; United States

Information
- Opened: 1913
- School district: Tangipahoa Parish School System
- Principal: Anne Faye Caminita
- Teaching staff: 114.10 (FTE)
- Grades: 9-12
- Enrollment: 2,254 (2023-2024)
- Student to teacher ratio: 19.75
- Campus type: Public School
- Colors: Forest green and white
- Athletics conference: LHSAA 5A
- Mascot: Green Wave
- Nickname: Green Wave
- Rival: Hammond High Magnet School
- Website: phs.tangischools.org

Ponchatoula High School is a public high school in unincorporated Tangipahoa Parish, Louisiana, United States, near Ponchatoula. It is operated by the Tangipahoa Parish School System. Ponchatoula High School is one of the largest high schools in the state of Louisiana by student enrollment.

== Athletics ==
Ponchatoula High athletics competes in the LHSAA.

The sports teams are known as the Green Wave or Greenwave, after the Tulane Green Wave. Ponchatoula High School's colors are, green and white, instead of Tulane's green and sky blue.

=== Championships ===
Football

- (1) State Championship: 1940

Boys' basketball

- (2) State Championship: 2023, 2024

Girls' basketball

- (2) State Championship: 2015, 2022

== Notable alumni ==
- Lindsey Cardinale, singer who appeared on American Idol
- T. J. Finley, college football quarterback
- Allen Graves, basketball player for the Toronto Raptors
- Dennis Paul Hebert, Sr., state representative for Tangipahoa Parish, 1972 to 1996
- Robert Henderson, professional football player
- Tyjae Spears, football player
- Jason Russell Williams, doctor, author, biotech entrepreneur

== See also ==
- Ponchatoula Creek
- USS Ponchatoula (AOG-38)
- USNS Ponchatoula (T-AO-148)

For etymology of the name "Ponchatoula," see Ponchatoula history.
