= St. Martinville Senior High School =

Location
- 762 North Main Street; St. Martinville, (St. Martin Parish), Louisiana 70582; United States; 30.1315°N 91.8266°W

Information
- Type: Public high school
- School district: St. Martin Parish School Board
- Principal: Jonathan Lane
- Staff: 36.19 (FTE)
- Enrollment: 585 (2023-2024)
- Student to teacher ratio: 16.16
- Colors: Purple and gold
- Mascot: Tiger
- Nickname: Tigers

Saint Martinville Senior High School (SMSH, also known locally as Senior High) is a high school in St. Martinville, Louisiana, United States. The school is 1 of 3 high schools in St. Martin Parish School Board System.

== Athletics ==
St. Martinville Senior High athletics competes in the LHSAA.

=== Championships ===
Football championships

- (2) State Championships: 1981, 1984

== See also ==
- St. Martin Parish School Board
- List of high schools in Louisiana
