= Drayton Florence =

American football player (born 1980)

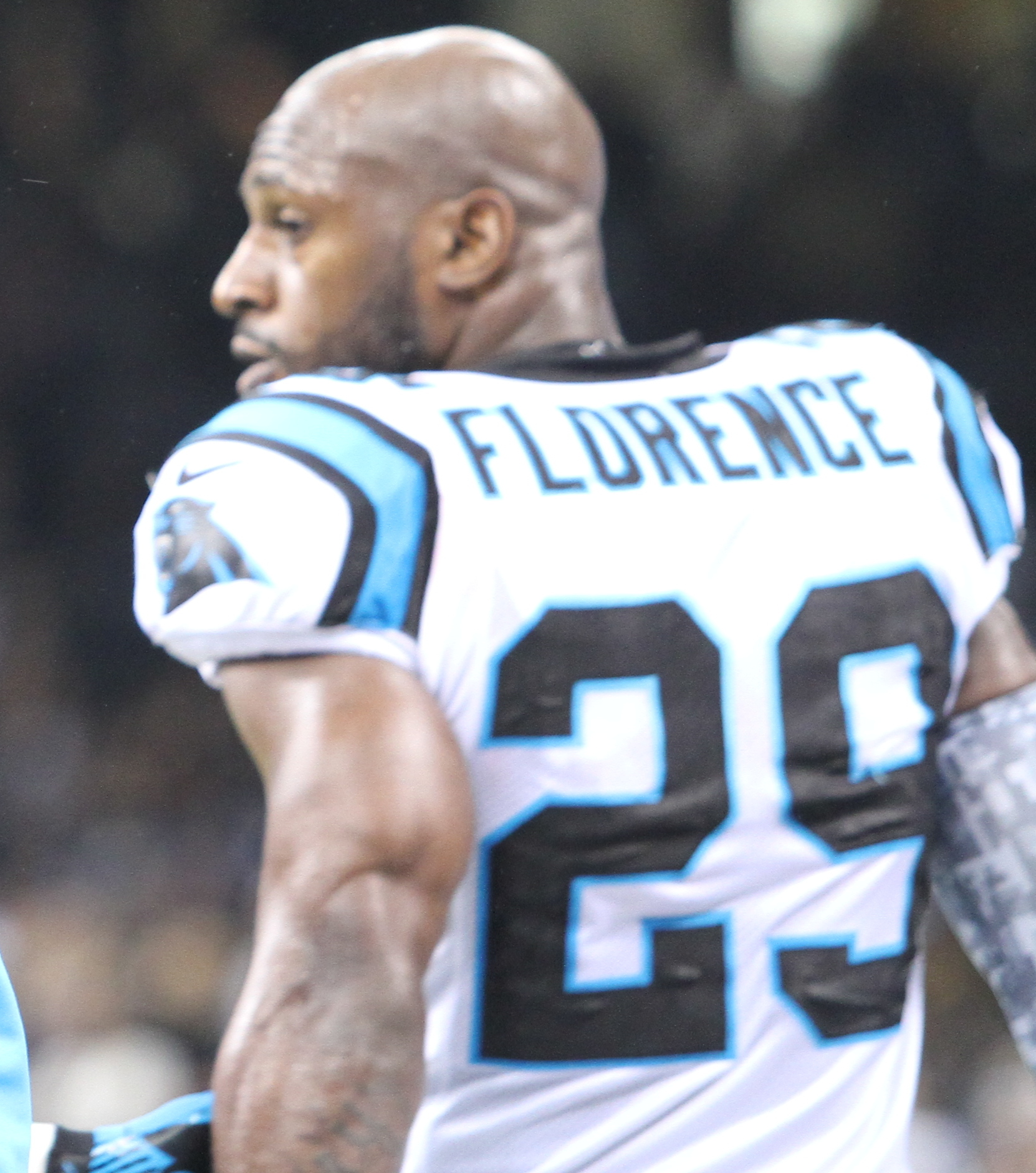
- Florence with the Carolina Panthers in 2013

No. 29, 21, 31
- Position: Cornerback

Personal information
- Born: December 19, 1980 (age 45); Ocala, Florida, U.S.
- Listed height: 6 ft 0 in (1.83 m)
- Listed weight: 193 lb (88 kg)

Career information
- High school: Vanguard (Ocala)
- College: Chattanooga (1999–2000); Tuskegee (2001–2002)
- NFL draft: 2003: 2nd round, 46th overall pick

Career history
- San Diego Chargers (2003–2007); Jacksonville Jaguars (2008); Buffalo Bills (2009–2011); Denver Broncos (2012)*; Detroit Lions (2012); Carolina Panthers (2013); Detroit Lions (2014)*
- * Offseason or practice squad member only

Career NFL statistics
- Total tackles: 486
- Forced fumbles: 3
- Fumble recoveries: 4
- Pass deflections: 103
- Interceptions: 20
- Defensive touchdowns: 4
- Stats at Pro Football Reference

Drayton Florence Jr. (born December 19, 1980) is an American former professional football player who was a cornerback for 11 seasons in the National Football League (NFL). He played college football for the Chattanooga Mocs and Tuskegee Golden Tigers. Florence was selected by the San Diego Chargers in the second round of the 2003 NFL draft.

== College career ==
Florence attended Tuskegee University. He was inducted into Tuskegee University Hall Of Fame in 2014 (2001–2002) after transferring from the University of Tennessee at Chattanooga (1999–2000). He registered school-record three returns for touchdowns on interceptions at Tuskegee. As a senior, he was named first-team Division II All-America by the Associated Press and American Coaches Association. Florence is the highest drafted player to enter the NFL from Tuskegee University. Florence finished his degree at the University of North Florida with a bachelor's degree in sport management.

== Professional career ==
Pre-draft measurables
Height	Weight	40-yard dash	10-yard split	20-yard split	Vertical jump	Broad jump	Bench press
6 ft 0 1/4 in (1.84 m)	198 lb (90 kg)	4.39 s	1.53 s	2.58 s	35 in (0.89 m)	10 ft 4 in (3.15 m)	18 reps
All values from NFL Combine.

=== San Diego Chargers ===
==== 2003 ====
The San Diego Chargers selected Florence in the second round (46th overall) of the 2003 NFL draft. He was the ninth cornerback drafted and was the second cornerback the Chargers drafted in 2003, following their first-round pick (30th overall) Sammy Davis. He became the highest selection in the NFL draft from Tuskegee University, surpassing his former teammate and fellow cornerback 2002 second-round pick (72nd overall) Roosevelt Williams. On July 23, 2003, the Chargers signed Florence to a five—year, $4.12 million rookie contract that included a signing bonus of $1.70 million.

The Chargers drafted for defensive backs in 2003 after having one of the lowest ranked pass defenses in 2002. They chose to rebuild the defense around speed, leading to the departures of starting cornerbacks Ryan McNeil and Alex Molden. He started training camp alongside cornerbacks Quentin Jammer, Tay Cody, and Sammy Davis. Head coach Marty Schottenheimer named Florence a backup and listed him as the fourth cornerback on the depth chart to begin the season, behind Quentin Jammer, Sammy Davis, and Tay Cody.

He was inactive during the Chargers' season-opener at the Kansas City Chiefs due to an eye injury. On September 17, 2003, the Chargers released Tay Cody after he injured his hamstring in their 14–27 loss at the Chiefs in Week 1. Defensive coordinator Dale Lindsey subsequently named Florence as third cornerback on the depth chart entering Week 2. On September 14, 2003, Florence made his professional regular season debut and recorded one solo tackle and returned one kick for 12–yards during a 13–37 loss to the Denver Broncos. In Week 4, he set a season-high with seven solo tackles and had one kick return for 24–yards during a 34–31 overtime loss at the Oakland Raiders. He finished his rookie season with 20 solo tackles and two pass deflections and had four kick returns for 47–yards while appearing in all 16 games without any starts.

==== 2004 ====
The San Diego Chargers hired Wade Phillips to be their new defensive coordinator after they chose not to renew the contract of Dale Lindsey following one of the worst ranked defenses and a 4–12 record in 2003. Entering training camp, Florence was a candidate to earn the role as the No. 2 starting cornerback, competing for it against Sammy Davis. Head coach Marty Schottenheimer named him a backup and listed him as the third cornerback on the depth chart to begin the season, behind Quentin Jammer and Sammy Davis.

On October 10, 2004, Florence recorded five solo tackles, set a season-high with two pass deflections, and made his first career interception off a pass by Byron Leftwich to wide receiver Ernest Wilford as the Chargers defeated the Jacksonville Jaguars 34–21. The following week, Florence made one pass deflection and had his second consecutive game with an interception after picking off a pass thrown by Michael Vick to wide receiver Dez White during a 20–21 loss at the Atlanta Falcons in Week 6. Entering Week 7, he was named the No. 2 starting cornerback, supplanting Sammy Davis. On October 24, 2004, Florence earned his first career start and recorded two combined tackles (one solo), before exiting during the fourth quarter of a 17–6 win at the Carolina Panthers due to an ankle injury. He remained inactive for the next three games (Weeks 8–9, 11) due to a high-ankle sprain. In Week 12, Florence returned and played as a backup cornerback in the Chargers 34–31 victory at the Kansas City Chiefs, but re-gained his starting role after Sammy Davis sustained a hairline fracture in his leg during the game that would sideline him for the next four games (Weeks 13–16). On December 5, 2004, Florence would have his breakout performance with three solo tackles, two pass deflections, and an interception on the opening drive on a pass by Jake Plummer to tight end Jeb Putzier as the Chargers defeated the Denver Broncos 20–17. During the fourth quarter, the Chargers led 20–17 when Jake Plummer attempted a touchdown pass to wide receiver Rod Smith that was deflected by Florence in coverage and tipped to safety Jerry Wilson for an interception to help maintain their lead with 3:45 remaining. His performance earned him AFC Defensive Player of the Week in Week 13. In Week 16, he set a season-high with seven solo tackles and made two pass deflections during a 31–34 overtime loss at the Indianapolis Colts. He finished with 36 combined tackles (31 solo), eight pass deflections, and a career-high four interceptions in 13 games and five starts.

The San Diego Chargers finished in first place in the AFC West in 2004 with a 12–4 record. On January 8, 2005, Florence started in his the first playoff game of his career and made two solo tackles and a pass deflection as the Chargers lost in overtime 17–20 in the AFC Wild-Card Game to the New York Jets.

==== 2005 ====
He returned alongside Quentin Jammer as the starting cornerbacks to begin the season in 2005. He was inactive for three games (Weeks 6–8) after injuring his ankle. On December 4, 2005, he set a season-high with seven solo tackles as the Chargers defeated the Oakland Raiders 34–10. In Week 15, Florence made six combined tackles (five solo), two pass deflections, and had his only interception of the season on a pass by Peyton Manning to wide receiver Reggie Wayne, but fumbled it after it was forced by tight end Dallas Clark and recovered by center Jeff Saturday during a 26–17 win at the Indianapolis Colts. He finished the season with 54 combined tackles (47 solo), 11 pass deflections, and one interception in 13 games and 12 starts.

==== 2006 ====
Throughout training camp, Florence attempted to retain his job as a starting cornerback after the Chargers selected Antonio Cromartie in the first-round (19th overall) of the 2006 NFL draft. Antonio Cromartie was unable to fully participate physically for the major of training camp due to a torn ACL he suffered in college. As a result, head coach Marty Schottenheimer named Florence and Quentin Jammer the starting cornerbacks to begin the season with Antonio Cromartie as the nickelback.

On October 15, 2006, he set a season-high with eight solo tackles and had one pass break-up during a 48–19 victory at the San Francisco 49ers. In Week 11, Florence made two combined tackles (one solo), one pass deflection, and secured the Chargers' 35–27 victory at the Denver Broncos by intercepting a pass Jake Plummer threw to wide receiver Rod Smith with only 3:10 remaining in the game. The following week, Florence had four combined tackles (two solo), made one pass deflection, and sealed a 21–14 victory for the Chargers against the Oakland Raiders by intercepting a pass by Aaron Brooks to wide receiver Ronald Curry with 2 minutes remaining in the fourth quarter in Week 12. He started in all 16 games throughout the 2006 NFL season for the first time in his career and finished with a career-high 66 combined tackles (54 solo), a career-high 16 pass deflections, and made three interceptions.

On January 14, 2007, in the AFC Divisional Playoff game against the New England Patriots, Florence committed a 15–yard unnecessary roughness penalty for head-butting Patriot Tight end Daniel Graham at the end of a third and 13–yard play where Tom Brady was sacked for a seven–yard loss by Shaun Phillips. The extension of the drive concluded with a 34–yard field goal by Stephen Gostkowski to close the Chargers' lead to only 13–14. The Patriots went on to win the game 24–21.

==== 2007 ====
On February 12, 2007, the San Diego Chargers unexpectedly fired head coach Marty Schottenheimer after they finished with a 14–2 record and made it to the Divisional Round. Throughout training camp, Florence competed against Antonio Cromartie to retain his role as the No. 2 starting cornerback under new defensive coordinator Ted Cottrell. Head coach Norv Turner named Florence and Quentin Jammer the starting cornerbacks to begin the season.

In Week 2, he set a season-high with seven combined tackles (five solo) during a 14–38 loss at the New England Patriots. On October 28, 2007, Florence recorded six solo tackles and made one pass deflection during a 35–10 win against the Houston Texans, but drew a penalty for a helmet-to-helmet hit he delivered to Matt Schaub during an interception by Antonio Cromartie in the second quarter. Matt Schaub immediately left the game with a concussion and remained inactive for the following week. On November 1, 2007, the NFL announced their decision to fine Florence $15,000 for the hit. Entering Week 12, Florence was demoted to nickelback and listed as the third cornerback on the depth chart as head coach Norv Turner chose to replace him with Antonio Cromartie. On December 2, 2007, Florence made two combined tackles (one solo), a pass deflection, and sealed a 24–10 victory at the Kansas City Chiefs by intercepting a pass by Damon Huard to wide receiver Eddie Kennison with 5:30 remaining. He finished his last season with the Chargers in 2007 with a total of 62 combined tackles (56 solo), ten pass deflections, and made two interceptions in 16 games and 12 starts.

The San Diego Chargers finished in first place in the AFC West with an 11–5 record to earn a Wild-Card berth. On January 6, 2008, Florence made three solo tackles, a pass deflection, and sealed a 6–17 win against the Tennessee Titans in the AFC Wild-Card Game by intercepting a pass by Vince Young to wide receiver Chris Davis with 3:44 remaining in the game. On January 20, 2008, Florence started in the AFC Championship Game and recorded three combined tackles (two solo), made one pass deflection, and intercepted a pass by Tom Brady to wide receiver Donte Stallworth as the Chargers lost 12–21 at the New England Patriots.

=== Jacksonville Jaguars ===
On March 1, 2008, the Jacksonville Jaguars signed Florence to a six—year, $36 million contract that included $13 million guaranteed and an initial signing bonus of $6 million. He entered training camp slated as the No. 2 starting cornerback under defensive coordinator Mel Tucker. Head coach Jack Del Rio named Florence and Rashean Mathis the starting cornerbacks to begin the season.

In Week 4, Florence recorded two solo tackles during a 30–27 overtime victory against the Houston Texans, but strained his groin on the final drive of the game. He would remain inactive as the Jaguars lost 21–26 to the Pittsburgh Steelers in Week 5 due to his groin injury. Entering Week 6, head coach Jack Del Rio chose to demote Florence to a backup role and named Brian Williams as his replacement. This coincided with the safety Reggie Nelson returning from a four–game absence due to a knee injury. During his absence, Brian Williams had started at strong safety in his place. On December 1, 2008, Rashean Mathis was placed on season-ending injured reserve due to a knee injury. Florence was named as his replacement and started alongside Brian Williams for the last four games (Weeks 13–16) of the season. In Week 15, he set a season-high with seven combined tackles (six solo) during a 20–16 victory against the Green Bay Packers. He finished the 2008 NFL season with 38 combined tackles (33 solo), three pass deflections, two fumble recoveries, and one forced fumble in 15 games and eight starts.

On February 11, 2009, the Jacksonville Jaguars released Florence after one season with the team.

=== Buffalo Bills ===
==== 2009 ====
On March 3, 2009, the Buffalo Bills signed Florence to a two—year, $6.60 million contract that included a signing bonus of $850,000. He entered training camp slated as the starting nickelback and primary backup at outside corner under defensive coordinator Perry Fewell. During training camp, he suffered a knee injury that caused him to miss the entire preseason, as well as the first two games (Weeks 1–2) of the regular season.

Upon his return entering Week 3, head coach Dick Jauron named him a backup and listed him as the third cornerback on the depth chart behind starters Leodis McKelvin and Terrence McGee. In Week 3, Leodis McKelvin suffered a cracked right fibula during the Bills' 7–27 loss to the New Orleans Saints. Florence was subsequently named his replacement at starting cornerback heading into Week 4. On November 17, 2009, the Bills fired head coach Dick Jauron after starting with a 3–6 record. Defensive coordinator Perry Fewell was appointed the interim head coach for the remainder of the season. On November 29, 2009, Florence made five combined tackles (four solo), set a season-high with four pass deflections, and secured the Bills' 31–14 victory against the Miami Dolphins by intercepting a pass by Chad Henne to wide receiver Brian Hartline with 2:43 remaining while the Bills led 17–14. The following week, he set a season-high with nine combined tackles (six solo) as the Bills lost 19–13 against the New York Jets in Week 13. He finished the 2009 NFL season with 60 combined tackles (49 solo), 11 pass deflections, and one interception in 14 games and 13 starts.

==== 2010 ====
Throughout training camp, Florence was a candidate to earn a role as a starting cornerback, competing against Terrence McGee and Leodis McKelvin under defensive coordinator George Edwards. Head coach Chan Gailey named Florence and Terrence McGee the starting cornerbacks to begin the season.

On September 12, 2010, Florence started in the Buffalo Bills' home-opener against the Miami Dolphins and set a season-high with ten combined tackles (nine solo) and made one pass deflection as they lost 10–15. On November 21, 2010, Florence had one of his best overall performances when he made three solo tackles, two pass deflections, an interception, and returned a fumble recovery that defensive tackle Marcus Stroud caused by running back Cedric Benson 27–yards to score his first career touchdown during a 49–31 victory at the Cincinnati Bengals. He also sealed their victory by intercepting a pass Carson Palmer threw to tight end Jermaine Gresham with 2:37 remaining in the game as the Bills had an 11-point lead at the time over the Bengals at 42–31. In Week 13, Florence made two solo tackles, two pass deflections, and set a career-high with two interceptions with one returned for a touchdown as the Bills lost 14–38 at the Minnesota Vikings. This was the first multi-interception game of his career as well as the first pick-six of his career. Florence intercepted a pass by Brett Favre to wide receiver Greg Camarillo and returned it for a 40–yard touchdown. He started in all 16 games throughout the 2010 NFL season and finished with a total of 58 combined tackles (49 solo), 15 pass deflections, four interceptions, two forced fumbles, one fumble recovery, and scored two touchdowns.

==== 2011 ====
On July 27, 2011, the Buffalo Bills signed Florence to a three—year, $15 million contract extension that included a signing bonus of $2 million. The day before, Jason La Canfora of NFL.com reported that a bidding war had broken out in between the Buffalo Bills and the New York Jets for Florence. The Jets were interested in signing him following the departure of Antonio Cromartie. After initial reports of the contract signing by Adam Schefter, Florence confirmed he re-signed with the Bills by writing a post on Twitter.

He entered training camp projected as the No. 1 starting cornerback, but was expected to see receive minor competition for the role from Leodis McKelvin, Terrence McGee, and 2011 second-round pick (34th overall) Aaron Williams. Head coach Chan Gailey named him the No. 1 starting cornerback to begin the season and paired him with Terrence McGee. On September 25, 2011, Florence made two solo tackles, two pass deflections, and helped secure a 31–34 victory against the New England Patriots by intercepting a pass from Tom Brady thrown to wide receiver Julian Edelman and returned for a 27–yard touchdown in the fourth quarter. In Week 6, he set a season-high with seven solo tackles as the Bills lost 24–21 at the New York Giants. In Week 12, Florence recorded four solo tackles, set a season-high with three pass deflections, and intercepted a pass by Mark Sanchez to wide receiver Santonio Holmes during a 24–28 loss at the New York Jets. He started in all 16 games throughout the 2011 NFL season and finished with 50 combined tackles (41 solo), 12 pass deflections, three interceptions, a forced fumble, one fumble recovery, and scored one touchdown.

On May 4, 2012, the Buffalo Bills released Florence with two—years remaining on his contract.

=== Denver Broncos ===
On May 10, 2012, the Denver Broncos signed Florence to a two–year, $4.50 million contract that included a signing bonus of $1.50 million. On August, 31, 2012, the Denver Broncos released him as part of their final roster cuts.

=== Detroit Lions (first stint) ===
On September 2, 2012, the Detroit Lions signed Florence to a one–year, $1 million contract with a signing bonus of $65,000. He was signed in order to provide necessary depth after starting cornerback Chris Houston suffered an ankle injury in their third preseason game at the Oakland Raiders.

Upon joining the team, head coach Jim Schwartz named Florence a backup and listed him as the third cornerback on the depth chart to begin the season, behind Bill Bentley and Jacob Lacey. In Week 1, Bill Bentley sustained a concussion during the Lions' 27–23 victory against the St. Louis Rams. In Week 2, Florence earned his first start with the Lions and recorded three solo tackles and made one pass deflection during a 19–27 loss at the San Francisco 49ers, but injured his forearm in the third quarter and chose to continue playing. On September 20, 2012, the Lions officially placed Florence on short-term injured reserve after he underwent surgery to repair a broken forearm and would remain inactive for the next eight games (Weeks 3–10). On November 1, 2012, the Lions placed Bill Bentley on season-ending injured reserve due to a shoulder injury. Upon his return entering Week 11, defensive coordinator Gunther Cunningham named him the starting nickelback and listed him as the third cornerback on the depth chart behind Chris Houston and Jacob Lacey. In Week 11, he set a season-high with six combined tackles (four solo) as the Lions lost 24–20 to the Green Bay Packers. On December 2, 2012, Florence recorded two solo tackles, set a season-high with four pass deflections, and had his only interception of the season on a pass by Andrew Luck to wide receiver T. Y. Hilton during a 33–35 loss against the Indianapolis Colts. He finished the 2012 NFL season with 19 combined tackles (17 solo), seven pass deflections, and two interceptions in eight games and two starts.

=== Carolina Panthers ===
On March 13, 2013, the Carolina Panthers signed Florence to a one–year, $940,000 contract. He was reunited with head coach Ron Rivera who was previously his defensive coordinator with the San Diego Chargers. Florence was signed expected to be a veteran presence among a young secondary.

On August 31, 2013, the Carolina Panthers released Florence as part of their final roster cuts. On September 19, 2013, the Panthers re-signed Florence after Josh Thomas sustained a concussion in Week 1 and Josh Norman injured his thigh. Upon joining the roster, head coach Ron Rivera named Florence the No. 2 starting cornerback, alongside Captain Munnerlyn. This was due to multiple mistakes by Josh Norman and D. J. Moore in Week 2 during a loss against the Buffalo Bills, leading both players to getting bench and D. J. Moore bring released. Entering Week 5, Florence was demoted to the third cornerback on the depth chart after the return of Josh Thomas from concussion protocol. On October 13, 2013, he set a season-high with three solo tackles and had one pass break-up during a 35–10 win at the Minnesota Vikings. On November 3, 2013, Florence made two combined tackles (one solo), one pass deflection, and had a pick-six on his first interception with the Panthers on a pass by Matt Ryan to wide receiver Drew Davis and returned it for a 38–yard touchdown as the Panthers defeated the Atlanta Falcons 10–34. In Week 10, Florence muffed a punt by Andy Lee at the end of the first quarter that was recovered by 49ers' safety Eric Reid and led to a 43–yard field goal by kicker Phil Dawson for a 6–0 lead for the 49ers. He would set his season-high with two pass deflections and also sealed the Panthers' 10–6 victory at the San Francisco 49ers by intercepting a pass attempt by Colin Kaepernick to wide receiver Mario Manningham with 37 seconds remaining. He finished the 2013 NFL season with 26 combined tackles (19 solo), nine pass deflections, two interceptions, and scored one touchdown in 14 games and five starts.

=== Detroit Lions (second stint) ===
On August 7, 2014, the Detroit Lions signed Florence to a one–year, $955,000 contract. He was seen as much needed experienced depth and was expected to compete against Jonte Green and Chris Greenwood for a backup cornerback role. On August 15, 2014, Florence had 14 snaps on defense and gave up one long pass as the Lions lost 26–27 at the Oakland Raiders. On August 19, 2014, the Lions released Florence as part of their roster cuts and after only being on the roster for 12 days with one preseason game.

On May 1, 2015, he retired from the NFL and graduated from the University of North Florida with a bachelor's degree in Sports Management.

== NFL career statistics ==
Year	Team	GP	Tackles				Fumbles			Interceptions					
Year	Team	GP	Cmb	Solo	Ast	Sck	FF	FR	Yds	Int	Yds	Avg	Lng	TD	PD
2003	SD	16	20	20	0	0.0	0	0	0	0	0	0	0	0	2
2004	SD	13	36	31	5	0.0	0	0	0	4	54	14	40	0	7
2005	SD	13	54	47	7	0.0	0	0	0	1	9	9	9	0	11
2006	SD	16	66	54	12	0.0	0	0	0	3	24	8	23	0	16
2007	SD	16	61	55	6	0.0	0	1	0	2	4	2	4	0	10
2008	JAX	15	36	32	4	0.0	1	1	0	0	0	0	0	0	3
2009	BUF	14	60	49	11	0.0	0	0	0	1	7	7	7	0	11
2010	BUF	16	58	49	9	0.0	1	1	27	3	42	14	40	1	15
2011	BUF	16	50	41	9	0.0	1	1	0	3	64	21	30	1	12
2012	DET	8	19	17	2	0.0	0	0	0	1	29	29	29	0	7
2013	CAR	14	26	19	7	0.0	0	0	0	2	40	20	38	1	9
Career		157	486	414	72	0.0	3	4	0	20	273	14	40	3	103

== Personal life ==
He is the cousin of Chicago Rush wide receiver Carlos Wright.
