= 2012 Detroit Lions season =

NFL team season

- Owner: William Clay Ford Sr.
- General manager: Martin Mayhew
- Head coach: Jim Schwartz
- Offensive coordinator: Scott Linehan
- Defensive coordinator: Gunther Cunningham
- Home stadium: Ford Field

Results
- Record: 4–12
- Division place: 4th NFC North
- Playoffs: Did not qualify
- All-Pros: WR Calvin Johnson (1st team); DT Ndamukong Suh (2nd team)
- Pro Bowlers: WR Calvin Johnson; DT Ndamukong Suh; LS Don Muhlbach

Uniform
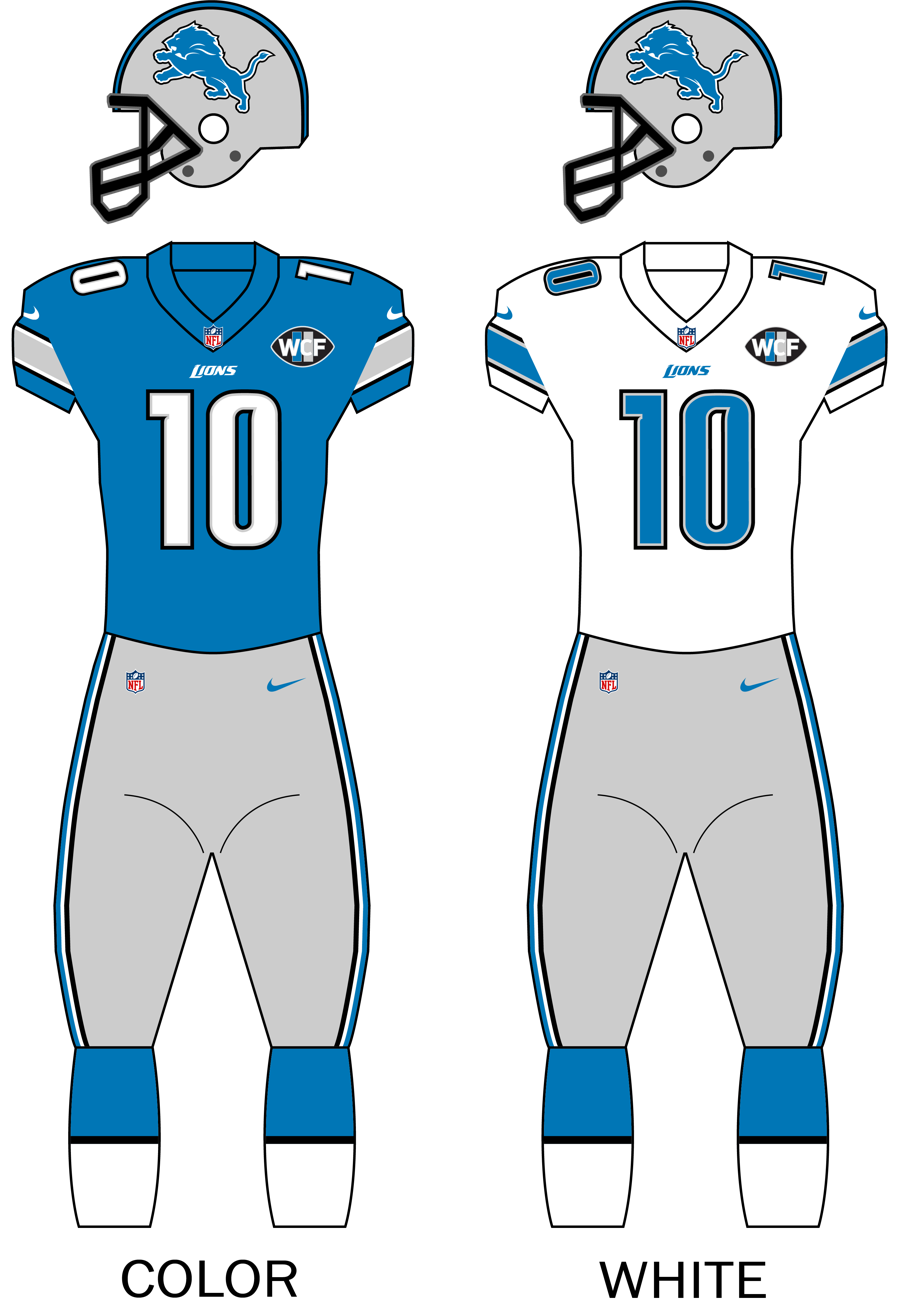

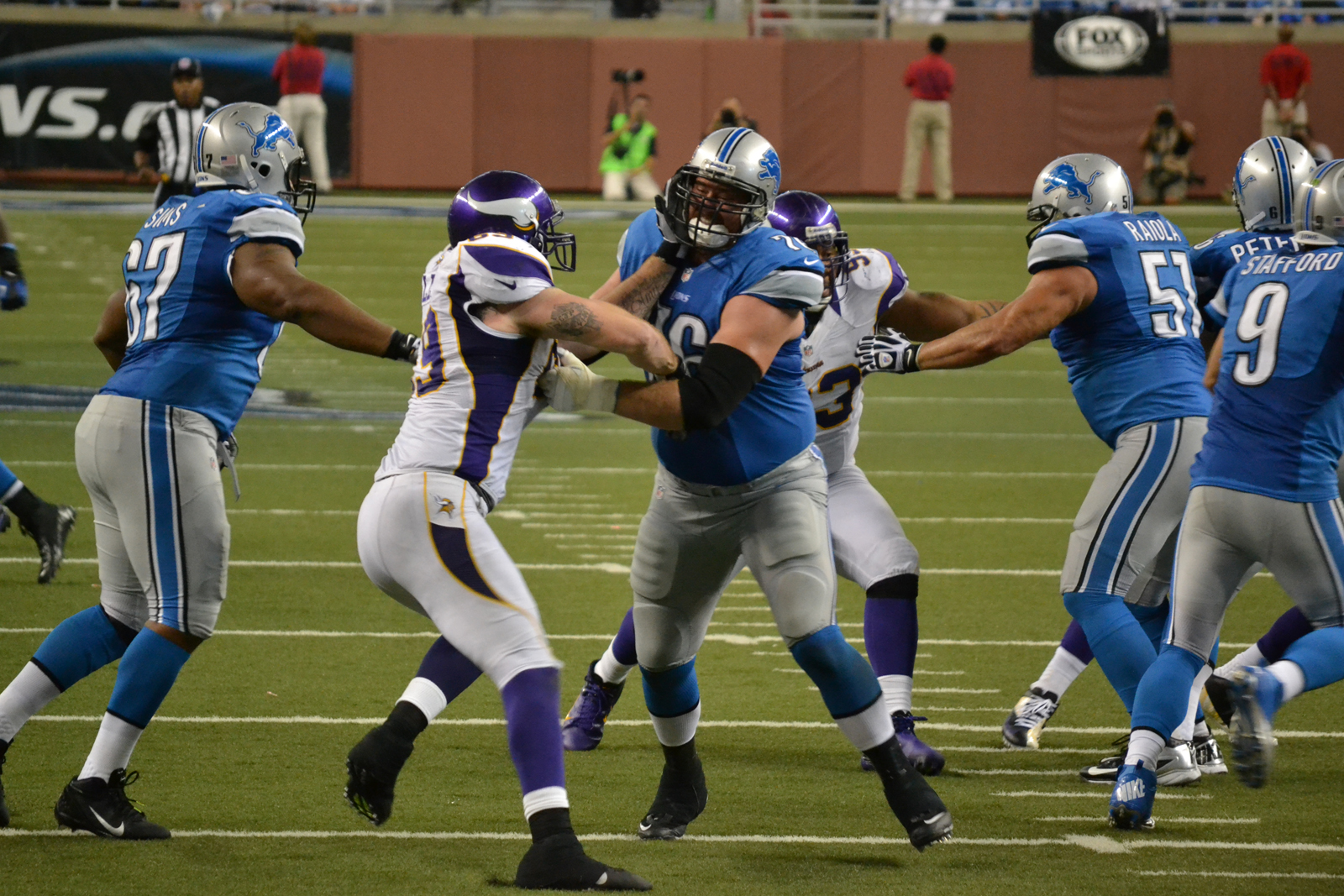
Blocking by the Lions' offense against Minnesota, September 30

The 2012 season was the Detroit Lions' 83rd in the National Football League (NFL), their 79th as the Detroit Lions and their fourth under head coach Jim Schwartz. The Lions failed to improve from their 10–6 record in 2011, and spent most of the season at the bottom of their division. They finished the season with an eight-game losing streak, their worst since the winless 2008 season. It was also the franchise's 21st consecutive season without a playoff win.

The Lions set an NFL record with 740 pass attempts during the season (46.25 attempts per game), breaking a record that had stood for thirty years.

This was the final season for longtime Lions placekicker Jason Hanson, who in his 21st season with the team (and in the league) and at age 42 was the NFL's oldest active player. Hanson retired on April 4, 2013.

Wide receiver Calvin Johnson broke Jerry Rice’s league record for most receiving yards in a single season, with 1,964 yards in 122 catches.

== Offseason ==
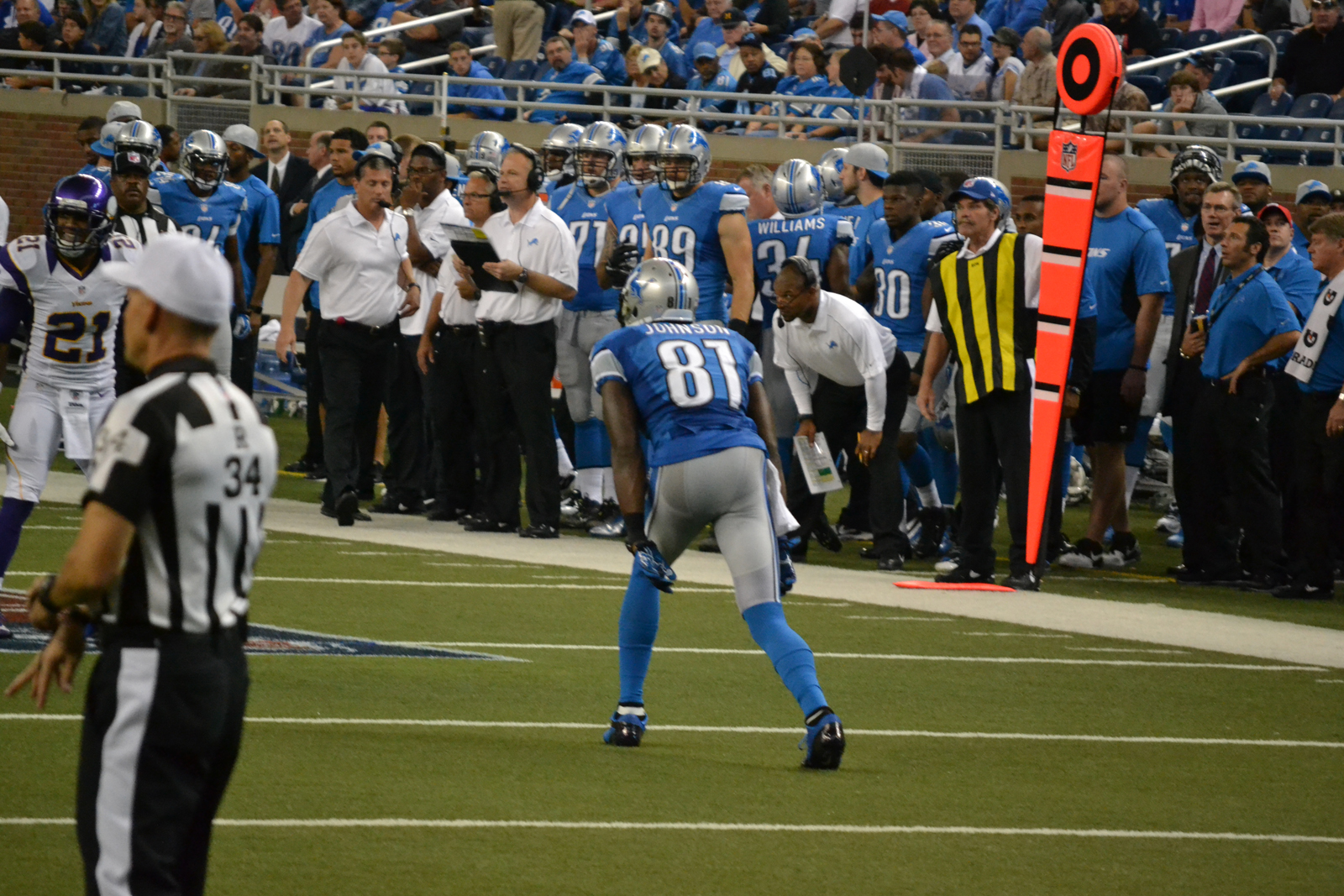
Josh Robinson and Calvin Johnson

=== Signings ===
Jacob Lacey signed with the Detroit Lions on March 20, 2012.

=== Releases ===
Cornerback Aaron Berry was released on July 23, 2012 after his second arrest of the offseason.

=== 2012 Draft class ===
Round	Selection	Player	Position	College
1	23	Riley Reiff	Offensive tackle	Iowa
2	54	Ryan Broyles	Wide receiver	Oklahoma
3	85	Dwight "Bill" Bentley	Cornerback	Louisiana–Lafayette
4	125	Ronnell Lewis	Outside linebacker	Oklahoma
5	138	Tahir Whitehead	Outside linebacker	Temple
5	148	Chris Greenwood	Cornerback	Albion
6	196	Jonte Green	Defensive back	New Mexico State
7	223	Travis Lewis	Linebacker	Oklahoma

== Final roster ==
2012 Detroit Lions roster
Quarterbacks (QB): 14 Shaun Hill; 17 Kellen Moore; 9 Matthew Stafford; Running backs (RB): 35 Joique Bell; 45 Shaun Chapas FB; 25 Mikel Leshoure; 30 Kevin Smith; Wide receivers (WR): 18 Kris Durham; 81 Calvin Johnson; 11 Stefan Logan; 10 Kassim Osgood; 80 Brian Robiskie; 19 Mike Thomas; Tight ends (TE): 89 Will Heller; 87 Brandon Pettigrew; 85 Tony Scheffler	Offensive linemen (OL): 76 Jeff Backus T; 77 Gosder Cherilus T; 70 Jason Fox T; 65 Dylan Gandy C; 78 Corey Hilliard T; 66 Stephen Peterman G; 51 Dominic Raiola C; 71 Riley Reiff T; 67 Rob Sims G; Defensive linemen (DL): 92 Cliff Avril DE; 96 Andre Fluellen DT; 94 Lawrence Jackson DE; 95 Ogemdi Nwagbuo DT; 63 Jimmy Saddler-McQueen DT; 90 Ndamukong Suh DT; 93 Kyle Vanden Bosch DE; 79 Willie Young DE	Linebackers (LB): 52 Justin Durant OLB; 54 DeAndre Levy OLB; 97 Ronnell Lewis OLB; 50 Travis Lewis MLB; 58 Ashlee Palmer OLB; 55 Stephen Tulloch MLB; 59 Tahir Whitehead OLB; Defensive backs (DB): 41 Ron Bartell CB; 32 Don Carey S; 26 Louis Delmas FS; 31 Drayton Florence CB; 36 Jonte Green CB; 23 Chris Houston CB; 24 Tyrell Johnson SS; 27 Pat Lee CB; 39 Ricardo Silva S; 29 John Wendling FS; Special teams (ST): 4 Jason Hanson K; 5 Nick Harris P; 48 Don Muhlbach LS	Practice squad: 74 Rodney Austin G; 38 Conroy Black CB; 73 Justin Boren G; 12 Troy Burrell WR; 83 Patrick Edwards WR (IR); 47 Carmen Messina LB; 43 Devin Moore RB; 40 Lionel Smith CB (IR); 34 Ross Weaver CB; Reserve: 28 Bill Bentley CB (IR); 44 Jahvid Best RB (PUP); 84 Ryan Broyles WR (IR); 13 Nate Burleson WR (IR); 98 Nick Fairley DT (IR); 33 Chris Greenwood CB (PUP); 36 Jerome Harrison RB (NF-Ill.); 91 Sammie Lee Hill DT (IR); 21 Jacob Lacey CB (IR); 61 Bill Nagy G (IR); 42 Amari Spievey SS (IR); 99 Corey Williams DT (IR); 16 Titus Young WR (IR); Rookies in italics 53 active, 15 reserve, 7 practice squad

== Schedule ==
=== Preseason ===
Week	Date	Opponent	Result	Record	Venue	Recap
1	August 10	Cleveland Browns	**L** 17–19	0–1	Ford Field	Recap
2	August 17	at Baltimore Ravens	**W** 27–12	1–1	M&T Bank Stadium	Recap
3	August 25	at Oakland Raiders	**L** 20–31	1–2	O.co Coliseum	Recap
4	August 30	Buffalo Bills	**W** 38–32	2–2	Ford Field	Recap

=== Regular season ===
Week	Date	Opponent	Result	Record	Venue	Recap
1	September 9	St. Louis Rams	**W** 27–23	1–0	Ford Field	Recap
2	September 16	at San Francisco 49ers	**L** 19–27	1–1	Candlestick Park	Recap
3	September 23	at Tennessee Titans	**L** 41–44 (OT)	1–2	LP Field	Recap
4	September 30	**Minnesota Vikings**	**L** 13–20	1–3	Ford Field	Recap
5	Bye					
6	October 14	at Philadelphia Eagles	**W** 26–23 (OT)	2–3	Lincoln Financial Field	Recap
7	October 22	at **Chicago Bears**	**L** 7–13	2–4	Soldier Field	Recap
8	October 28	Seattle Seahawks	**W** 28–24	3–4	Ford Field	Recap
9	November 4	at Jacksonville Jaguars	**W** 31–14	4–4	EverBank Field	Recap
10	November 11	at **Minnesota Vikings**	**L** 24–34	4–5	Hubert H. Humphrey Metrodome	Recap
11	November 18	**Green Bay Packers**	**L** 20–24	4–6	Ford Field	Recap
12	November 22	Houston Texans	**L** 31–34 (OT)	4–7	Ford Field	Recap
13	December 2	Indianapolis Colts	**L** 33–35	4–8	Ford Field	Recap
14	December 9	at **Green Bay Packers**	**L** 20–27	4–9	Lambeau Field	Recap
15	December 16	at Arizona Cardinals	**L** 10–38	4–10	University of Phoenix Stadium	Recap
16	December 22	Atlanta Falcons	**L** 18–31	4–11	Ford Field	Recap
17	December 30	**Chicago Bears**	**L** 24–26	4–12	Ford Field	Recap

Note: Intra-division opponents are in bold text.

== Regular season results ==
=== Standings ===
NFC North
	W	L	T	PCT	DIV	CONF	PF	PA	STK
^{(3)} Green Bay Packers	11	5	0	.688	5–1	8–4	433	336	L1
^{(6)} Minnesota Vikings	10	6	0	.625	4–2	7–5	379	348	W4
Chicago Bears	10	6	0	.625	3–3	7–5	375	277	W2
Detroit Lions	4	12	0	.250	0–6	3–9	372	437	L8

=== Week 1: vs. St. Louis Rams ===
Week One: St. Louis Rams at Detroit Lions – Game summary

Quarter	1	2	3	4	Total
Rams	3	10	0	10	23
Lions	0	10	3	14	27

at Ford Field, Detroit, Michigan

- Date: September 9
- Game time: 1:00 p.m. EDT
- Game weather: Played indoors (dome stadium)
- Game attendance: 62,315
- Referee: Donovan Briggans
- TV announcers (Fox): Chris Myers, Tim Ryan and Jaime Maggio
- Recap
  Gamebook

Game information

First quarter

- STL – Greg Zuerlein 48-yard field goal, Rams 3–0, Drive: 10 plays, 36 yards, 5:49.

Second quarter

- DET – Joique Bell 1-yard run (Jason Hanson kick), Lions 7–3, Drive: 14 plays, 80 yards, 7:31.
- STL – Greg Zuerlein 29-yard field goal, Lions 7–6, Drive: 8 plays, 43 yards, 4:30.
- STL – Cortland Finnegan 31-yard interception return (Greg Zuerlein kick), Rams 13–7, Drive: 1 play, 31 yards, 0:00.
- DET – Jason Hanson 41-yard field goal, Rams 13–10, Drive: 5 plays, 53 yards, 1:08.

Third quarter

- DET – Jason Hanson 45-yard field goal, Tied 13–13, Drive: 5 plays, 15 yards, 2:54.

Fourth quarter

- STL – Brandon Gibson 23-yard pass from Sam Bradford (Greg Zuerlein kick), Rams 20–13, Drive: 5 plays, 47 yards, 2:42.
- DET – Kevin Smith 5-yard run (Jason Hanson kick), Tied 20–20, Drive: 5 plays, 80 yards, 2:26.
- STL – Greg Zuerlein 46-yard field goal, Rams 23–20, Drive: 13 plays, 52 yards, 5:24.
- DET – Kevin Smith 5-yard pass from Matthew Stafford (Jason Hanson kick), Lions 27–23, Drive: 9 plays, 80 yards, 1:45.

Top passers

- STL – Sam Bradford – 17/25, 198 yards, 1 touchdown
- DET – Matthew Stafford – 32/48, 355 yards, 1 touchdown, 3 interceptions

Top rushers

- STL – Steven Jackson – 21 carries, 53 yards
- DET – Kevin Smith – 13 carries, 52 yards, 1 touchdown

Top receivers

- STL – Danny Amendola – 5 receptions, 70 yards
- DET – Calvin Johnson – 6 receptions, 111 yards

Top tacklers

- STL – Cortland Finnegan – 9 tackles, 1 assist, 1 interception, 1 touchdown
- DET – Justin Durant – 7 tackles, 5 assists

To open the regular season, the Lions hosted the St. Louis Rams. The Rams took an early lead when Greg Zuerlein kicked a 48-yard field goal, the only scoring drive of the first quarter. The Lions responded in the second quarter when Joique Bell ran in a touchdown from 1 yard out. St. Louis made it a 1-point game when Greg Zuerlein kicked a 29-yard field goal, and took the lead again when Cortland Finnegan intercepted a Matthew Stafford pass and ran it back 31 yards for a touchdown. The final points of the half were scored when Detroit's Jason Hanson kicked a 41-yard field goal. The only points of the third quarter was a 45-yard field goal by Jason Hanson to tie the game. In the final quarter, the score continued to sea-saw. First the Rams' Brandon Gibson caught a 23-yard touchdown pass from Sam Bradford to take the lead back again, but the Lions soon tied it back up when Kevin Smith ran in a touchdown from 5 yards out. The Rams then went up by 3 points when kicked Greg Zuerlein his third field goal of the game, this one from 46 yards out. In the final 2 minutes, the Lions completed their third 80-yard scoring drive with a game-winning 5-yard touchdown catch by Kevin Smith, his second of the game. The Lions were able to start 1–0 and capture their second straight regular season opening win.

=== Week 2: at San Francisco 49ers ===
Week Two: Detroit Lions at San Francisco 49ers – Game summary

Quarter	1	2	3	4	Total
Lions	6	0	3	10	19
49ers	7	7	3	10	27

at Candlestick Park, San Francisco, California

- Date: September 16
- Game time: 8:20 p.m. EDT/5:20 p.m. PDT
- Game weather: 62 °F (17 °C), mostly sunny
- Game attendance: 69,732
- Referee: Matt Nicks
- TV announcers (NBC): Al Michaels, Cris Collinsworth and Michele Tafoya
- Recap
  Gamebook

Game information

First quarter

- SF – Vernon Davis 21-yard pass from Alex Smith (David Akers kick), 49ers 7–0, Drive: 4 plays, 67 yards, 1:12.
- DET – Jason Hanson 38-yard field goal, 49ers 7–3, Drive: 8 plays, 48 yards, 4:48.
- DET – Jason Hanson 41-yard field goal, 49ers 7–6, Drive: 4 plays, 2 yards, 0:54.

Second quarter

- SF – Frank Gore 1-yard run (David Akers kick), 49ers 14–6, Drive: 5 plays, 23 yards, 2:24.

Third quarter

- SF – David Akers 36-yard field goal, 49ers 17–6, Drive: 10 plays, 62 yards, 5:18.
- DET – Jason Hanson 40-yard field goal, 49ers 17–9, Drive: 10 plays, 39 yards, 6:02.

Fourth quarter

- SF – David Akers 48-yard field goal, 49ers 20–9, Drive: 10 plays, 55 yards, 3:58.
- DET – Jason Hanson 48-yard field goal, 49ers 20–12, Drive: 9 plays, 50 yards, 5:26.
- SF – Vernon Davis 23-yard pass from Alex Smith (David Akers kick), 49ers 27–12, Drive: 13 plays, 79 yards, 6:12.
- DET – Brandon Pettigrew 9-yard pass from Matthew Stafford (Jason Hanson kick), 49ers 27–19, Drive: 10 plays, 80 yards, 1:35.

Top passers

- DET – Matthew Stafford – 19/32, 230 yards, 1 touchdown, 1 interception
- SF – Alex Smith – 20/31, 226 yards, 2 touchdowns

Top rushers

- DET – Kevin Smith – 16 carries, 53 yards
- SF – Frank Gore – 17 carries, 89 yards, 1 touchdown

Top receivers

- DET – Calvin Johnson – 8 receptions, 94 yards
- SF – Vernon Davis – 5 receptions, 73 yards, 2 touchdowns

Top tacklers

- DET – DeAndre Levy – 10 tackles
- SF – Patrick Willis – 8 tackles, 1 assist

In week 2, the Lions flew west to play the San Francisco 49ers on Sunday Night Football. The 49ers got on the board first with a 21-yard touchdown pass from Alex Smith to Vernon Davis. The Lions responded with two field goals by Jason Hanson, from 38 and 41 yards respectively. The only scoring play of the second quarter was a 1-yard touchdown run by Frank Gore. In the third quarter came a pair of field goals, first a 36-yard kick by San Francisco's David Akers, and later a 40-yard one from Detroit's Jason Hanson. In the final quarter, both teams kicked two more field goals both from 48 yards out, first the 49ers' David Akers, then the Lions' Jason Hanson. Next, San Francisco's Vernon Davis caught his second touchdown pass of the game, this one from 23 yards out. Lastly, Detroit scored their only touchdown of the game when Brandon Pettigrew caught a 9-yard pass from Matthew Stafford dropping the team to 1–1.

=== Week 3: at Tennessee Titans ===
Week Three: Detroit Lions at Tennessee Titans – Game summary

Quarter	1	2	3	4	OT	Total
Lions	6	3	7	25	0	41
Titans	10	10	0	21	3	44

at LP Field, Nashville, Tennessee

- Date: September 23
- Game time: 1:00 p.m. EDT/12:00 p.m. CDT
- Game weather: 68 °F (20 °C), sunny
- Game attendance: 69,143
- Referee: Gerald Wright
- TV announcers (Fox): Ron Pitts, Mike Martz and Kristina Pink
- Recap
  Gamebook

Game information

First quarter

- DET – Jason Hanson 47-yard field goal, Lions 3–0, Drive: 9 plays, 39 yards, 3:22.
- DET – Jason Hanson 53-yard field goal, Lions 6–0, Drive: 6 plays, 19 yards, 2:16.
- TEN – Rob Bironas 31-yard field goal, Lions 6–3, Drive: 9 plays, 66 yards, 4:34.
- TEN – Tommie Campbell 65-yard punt return (Rob Bironas kick), Titans 10–6, Drive: 1 play, 65 yards, 0:00.

Second quarter

- TEN – Jared Cook 61-yard pass from Jake Locker (Rob Bironas kick), Titans 17–6, Drive: 2 plays, 59 yards, 1:12.
- DET – Jason Hanson 33-yard field goal, Titans 17–9, Drive: 13 plays, 65 yards, 6:30.
- TEN – Rob Bironas 38-yard field goal, Titans 20–9, Drive: 9 plays, 70 yards, 2:17.

Third quarter

- DET – Mikel Leshoure 1-yard run (Jason Hanson kick), Titans 20–16, Drive: 8 plays, 69 yards, 2:54.

Fourth quarter

- DET – Jason Hanson 26-yard field goal, Titans 20–19, Drive: 10 plays, 54 yards, 4:39.
- DET – Nate Burleson 3-yard pass from Matthew Stafford (Matthew Stafford pass to Nate Burleson for two-point conversion), Lions 27–20, Drive: 9 plays, 46 yards, 4:57.
- TEN – Darius Reynaud 105-yard kickoff return (Rob Bironas kick), Tied 27–27, Drive: 1 play, 105 yards, 0:00.
- TEN – Nate Washington 71-yard pass from Jake Locker (Rob Bironas kick), Titans 34–27, Drive: 1 play, 66 yards, 1:19.
- TEN – Alterraun Verner 72-yard fumble return (Rob Bironas kick), Titans 41–27, Drive: 1 play, 72 yards, 0:00.
- DET – Calvin Johnson 3-yard pass from Shaun Hill (Jason Hanson kick), Titans 41–34, Drive: 7 plays, 68 yards, 0:58.
- DET – Titus Young 46-yard pass from Shaun Hill (Jason Hanson kick), Tied 41–41, Drive: 2 plays, 46 yards, 0:18.

Overtime

- TEN – Rob Bironas 26-yard field goal, Titans 44–41, Drive: 13 plays, 72 yards, 4:24.

Top passers

- DET – Matthew Stafford – 33/42, 278 yards, 1 touchdown
- TEN – Jake Locker – 29/42, 378 yards, 2 touchdowns

Top rushers

- DET – Mikel Leshoure – 26 carries, 100 yards, 1 touchdown
- TEN – Jake Locker – 4 carries, 35 yards

Top receivers

- DET – Calvin Johnson – 10 receptions, 164 yards, 1 touchdown
- TEN – Nate Washington – 3 receptions, 112 yards, 1 touchdown

Top tacklers

- DET – Bill Bentley – 5 tackles, 1 assist
- TEN – Akeem Ayers, 10 tackles, 1 sack

In week 3, the Lions traveled south to Nashville to play the Tennessee Titans. This game was the highest scoring game of the 2012 NFL season. Detroit started the scoring in the first quarter with a pair of field goals by Jason Hanson, from 47 and 53 yards respectively. On the Titans first drive, they fumbled the snap and the Lions recovered the ball. The Titans responded with a 31-yard field goal by Rob Bironas, and took the lead when Darius Reynaud caught a Ben Graham punt and threw a lateral to Tommie Campbell who ran back a 65-yard touchdown. Tennessee added more points in the second quarter when Jared Cook caught a 61-yard touchdown pass from Jake Locker. The Lions responded when Jason Hanson kicked a 33-yard field goal. The final points of the first half was a 38-yard kick by The Titans' Rob Bironas. The only points of the third quarter was a 1-yard touchdown run by Detroit's Mikel Leshoure, sandwiched between two missed FGAs by Bironas. The fourth quarter scoring started when Jason Hanson kicked a 26-yard field goal. Next, the Lions' Nate Burleson caught a 3-yard touchdown pass from Matthew Stafford and the same duo completed a two-point conversion. Tennessee then scored 3 consecutive touchdowns. First, after already returning a punt for a touchdown, Darius Reynaud returned a kickoff 105 yards for a touchdown. Following a Lions punt, Nate Washington caught a 71-yard touchdown pass from Locker. The Lions drove deep into Titans territory on the next drive but Alterraun Verner yanked the ball out of Brandon Pettigrew's hands and ran back a 72-yard touchdown. Matthew Stafford had to come out of the game with a pulled leg muscle and Shaun Hill responded with a drive ending in a three-yard touchdown to Calvin Johnson with just twenty seconds to go. The Lions kicked onside and Amari Spievey caught the ball off a bounce at the Detroit 35-yard line. Even if Spievey did recover the onside and drove down the field further, his team was set up on the 46-yard line. On the final play of regulation, Hill went deep and Titus Young caught the 46-yard touchdown off a partial deflection. Tied 41–41, the game went to overtime. After winning the coin toss, the Titans' Rob Bironas kicked the game-winning a field goal from 26 yards out. The Lions then drove down field, but were stopped on a fourth-down stand at the Titans 7-yard line as the team fell to 1–2.

=== Week 4: vs. Minnesota Vikings ===
Week Four: Minnesota Vikings at Detroit Lions – Game summary

Quarter	1	2	3	4	Total
Vikings	10	3	7	0	20
Lions	3	3	0	7	13

at Ford Field, Detroit, Michigan

- Date: September 30
- Game time: 1:00 p.m. EDT
- Game weather: Played indoors (dome stadium)
- Game attendance: 63,671
- Referee: Clete Blakeman
- TV announcers (Fox): Thom Brennaman, Brian Billick and Laura Okmin
- Recap
  Gamebook

Game information

First quarter

- MIN – Percy Harvin 105-yard kickoff return (Blair Walsh kick), Vikings 7–0, Drive: 1 play, 105 yards, 0:00.
- DET – Jason Hanson 40-yard field goal, Vikings 7–3, Drive: 4 plays, 58 yards, 1:42.
- MIN – Blair Walsh 49-yard field goal, Vikings 10–3, Drive: 7 plays, 60 yards, 3:53.

Second quarter

- MIN – Blair Walsh 27-yard field goal, Vikings 13–3, Drive: 11 plays, 82 yards, 4:56.
- DET – Jason Hanson 31-yard field goal, Vikings 13–6, Drive: 14 plays, 67 yards, 6:28.

Third quarter

- MIN – Marcus Sherels 77-yard punt return (Blair Walsh kick), Vikings 20–6, Drive: 1 play, 77 yards, 0:00.

Fourth quarter

- DET – Matthew Stafford 1-yard run (Jason Hanson kick), Vikings 20–13, Drive: 11 plays, 77 yards, 3:l2.

Top passers

- MIN – Christian Ponder – 16/26 111 yards
- DET – Matthew Stafford – 30/51, 319 yards

Top rushers

- MIN – Adrian Peterson – 21 carries, 102 yards
- DET – Mikel Leshoure – 13 carries, 26 yards

Top receivers

- MIN – Jerome Simpson – 4 receptions, 50 yards
- DET – Joique Bell – 6 receptions, 72 yards

Top tacklers

- MIN – Chad Greenway – 7 tackles, 4 assists
- DET – DeAndre Levy – 8 tackles, 1 assist

In week 4, the Lions hosted their NFC North Division rivals the Minnesota Vikings. The Vikings took an early lead when Percy Harvin returned the opening kickoff 105 yards for a touchdown. The Lions responded with a 40-yard field goal by Jason Hanson. Minnesota's Blair Walsh then kicked a field goal from 49 yards out. Both teams kicked a field goal in the second quarter, first Minnesota's Blair Walsh from 27 yards out, then Detroit's Jason Hanson from 31 yards. The only scoring drive of the third quarter was when the Vikings' Marcus Sherels returned a punt 77 yards for a touchdown. The Lions scored the only points of the final quarter when quarterback Matthew Stafford completed a 1-yard run for a touchdown. With the loss, the Lions went into their bye week at 1–3.

=== Week 6: at Philadelphia Eagles ===
Week Six: Detroit Lions at Philadelphia Eagles – Game summary

Quarter	1	2	3	4	OT	Total
Lions	6	0	0	17	3	26
Eagles	0	7	6	10	0	23

at Lincoln Financial Field, Philadelphia, Pennsylvania

- Date: October 14
- Game time: 1:00 p.m. EDT
- Game weather: 66 °F (19 °C), mostly sunny
- Game attendance: 69,144
- Referee: Bill Vinovich
- TV announcers (Fox): Kenny Albert, Daryl Johnston and Tony Siragusa
- Recap
  Gamebook

Game information

First quarter

- DET – Jason Hanson 46-yard field goal, Lions 3–0, Drive: 4 plays, 6 yards, :055.
- DET – Jason Hanson 34-yard field goal, Lions 6–0, Drive: 10 plays, 65 yards, 5:45.

Second quarter

- PHI – LeSean McCoy 2-yard pass from Michael Vick (Alex Henery kick), Eagles 7–6, Drive: 7 plays, 79 yards, 3:28.

Third quarter

- PHI – Alex Henery 26-yard field goal, Eagles 10–6, Drive: 15 plays, 72 yards, 6:37.
- PHI – Alex Henery 32-yard field goal, Eagles 13–6, Drive: 10 plays, 50 yards, 3:40.

Fourth quarter

- PHI – Alex Henery 49-yard field goal, Eagles 16–6, Drive: 9 plays, 35 yards, 3:11.
- DET – Matthew Stafford 1-yard run (Jason Hanson kick), Eagles 16–13, Drive: 7 plays, 80 yards, 3:09.
- PHI – Jeremy Maclin 70-yard pass from Michael Vick (Alex Henery kick), Eagles 23–13, Drive: 3 plays, 76 yards, 1:29.
- DET – Nate Burleson 17-yard pass from Matthew Stafford (Jason Hanson kick), Eagles 23–20, Drive: 7 plays, 80 yards, 1:46.
- DET – Jason Hanson 19-yard field goal, Tied 23–23, Drive: 12 plays, 67 yards, 2:24.

Overtime

- DET – Jason Hanson 45-yard field goal, Lions 26–23, 5 plays, 23 yards, 2:22.

Top passers

- DET – Matthew Stafford – 22/45, 311 yards, 1 touchdown, 1 interception
- PHI – Michael Vick – 28/46, 311 yards, 2 touchdowns, 2 interceptions

Top rushers

- DET – Mikel LeShoure – 15 carries, 70 yards
- PHI – Michael Vick – 9 carries, 59 yards

Top receivers

- DET – Calvin Johnson – 6 receptions, 135 yards
- PHI – Jeremy Maclin – 6 receptions, 130 yards, 1 touchdown

Top tacklers

- DET – Justin Durant – 8 tackles
- PHI – DeMeco Ryans – 10 tackles, 3 assists

After their bye week, the Lions traveled east to play the Philadelphia Eagles. The Lions took an early lead in the first quarter with two field goals by Jason Hanson, from 46 and 34 yards out. The only scoring drive of the second quarter was a 2-yard touchdown pass from Michael Vick to LeSean McCoy to put Philadelphia up by 1 point. In the third quarter the Eagles' Alex Henery kicked 2 field goals, from 26 and 32 yards out. In the fourth quarter, Alex Henery kicked a 49-yard field goal. The Lions responded with a 1-yard touchdown run by Matthew Stafford. The Eagles' Jeremy Maclin then caught a 70-yard touchdown pass from Michael Vick. The Lions responded with their own touchdown pass, a 17-yarder from Matthew Stafford to Nate Burleson. The Lions took it to overtime after Jason Hanson kicked a 19-yard field goal. On the second drive in Overtime, the Lions' Jason Hanson kicked the game-winning field goal from 45 yards out. With the win, the Lions improved to 2–3, snapping their 3-game losing streak.

=== Week 7: at Chicago Bears ===
Week Seven: Detroit Lions at Chicago Bears – Game summary

Quarter	1	2	3	4	Total
Lions	0	0	0	7	7
Bears	10	0	3	0	13

at Soldier Field, Chicago, Illinois

- Date: October 22
- Game time: 8:30 p.m. EDT/7:30 p.m. CDT
- Game weather: 63 °F (17 °C), cloudy
- Game attendance: 62,300
- Referee: Alberto Riveron
- TV announcers (ESPN): Mike Tirico, Jon Gruden and Lisa Salters
- Recap
  Gamebook

Game information

First quarter

- CHI – Brandon Marshall 7-yard pass from Jay Cutler (Robbie Gould kick), Bears 7–0, Drive: 6 plays, 59 yards, 2:50.
- CHI – Robbie Gould 39-yard field goal, Bears 10–0, Drive: 5 plays, 29 yards, 2:39.

Second quarter

- No scoring plays

Third quarter

- CHI – Robbie Gould 21-yard field goal, Bears 13–0, Drive: 7 plays, 24 yards, 2:12.

Fourth quarter

- DET – Ryan Broyles 12-yard pass from Matthew Stafford (Jason Hanson kick), Bears 13–7, Drive: 8 plays, 58 yards, 1:43.

Top passers

- DET – Matthew Stafford – 28/46, 261 yards, 1 touchdown, 1 interception
- CHI – Jay Cutler – 16/31, 150 yards, 1 touchdown

Top rushers

- DET – Mikel LeShoure – 12 carries, 63 yards
- CHI – Matt Forte – 22 carries, 96 yards

Top receivers

- DET – Titus Young – 6 receptions, 81 yards
- CHI – Brandon Marshall – 6 receptions, 81 yards, 1 touchdown

Top tacklers

- DET – Amari Spievey – 6 tackles, 2 assists
- CHI – Tim Jennings – 7 tackles, 2 assists

In week 7, the Lions traveled to Chicago to take on their NFC North Division arch-rivals the Chicago Bears on Monday Night Football. The Bears struck first when Brandon Marshall caught a 7-yard touchdown pass from Jay Cutler, and added more points when Robbie Gould kicked a 39-yard field goal. After a scoreless second quarter, the Bears' Robbie Gould scored the only points of the third quarter with a 21-yard field goal. The Lions scored their only points of the game in the fourth quarter when Ryan Broyles caught a 12-yard touchdown pass from Matthew Stafford. It was their fifth straight loss at Chicago as they dropped to 2–4 on the season.

=== Week 8: vs. Seattle Seahawks ===
Week Eight: Seattle Seahawks at Detroit Lions – Game summary

Quarter	1	2	3	4	Total
Seahawks	3	14	0	7	24
Lions	7	7	0	14	28

at Ford Field, Detroit, Michigan

- Date: October 28
- Game time: 1:00 p.m. EDT
- Game weather: Played indoors (dome stadium)
- Game attendance: 63,497
- Referee: John Parry
- TV announcers (Fox): Chris Myers, Tim Ryan and Jaime Maggio
- Recap
  Gamebook

Game information

First quarter

- SEA – Steven Hauschka 23-yard field goal, Seahawks 3–0, Drive: 13 plays, 72 yards, 6:58.
- DET – Ryan Broyles 6-yard pass from Matthew Stafford (Jason Hanson kick), Lions 7–3, Drive: 9 plays, 82 yards, 5:30.

Second quarter

- SEA – Marshawn Lynch 77-yard run (Steven Hauschka kick), Seahawks 10–7, Drive: 1 play, 77 yards, 0:17.
- SEA – Sidney Rice 9-yard pass from Russell Wilson (Steven Hauschka kick), Seahawks 17–7, Drive: 3 plays, 56 yards, 0:44.
- DET – Titus Young 46-yard pass from Matthew Stafford (Jason Hanson kick), Seahawks 17–14, Drive: 6 plays, 80 yards, 2:50.

Third quarter

- No scoring plays

Fourth quarter

- DET – Matthew Stafford 1-yard run (Jason Hanson kick), Lions 21–17, Drive: 9 plays, 56 yards, 5:22.
- SEA – Zach Miller 16-yard pass from Russell Wilson (Steven Hauschka kick), Seahawks 24–21, Drive: 12 plays, 87 yards, 6:08.
- DET – Titus Young 1-yard pass from Matthew Stafford (Jason Hanson kick), Lions 28–21, Drive: 16 plays, 80 yards, 5:07.

Top passers

- SEA – Russell Wilson – 25/35, 217 yards, 2 touchdowns, 1 interception
- DET – Matthew Stafford – 34/49, 352 yards, 3 touchdowns, 1 interception

Top rushers

- SEA – Marshawn Lynch – 12 carries, 105 yards, 1 touchdown
- DET – Mikel Leshoure – 10 carries, 46 yards

Top receivers

- SEA – Sidney Rice – 6 receptions, 55 yards, 1 touchdown
- DET – Titus Young – 9 receptions, 100 yards, 2 touchdowns

Top tacklers

- SEA – Bobby Wagner – 6 tackles, 6 assists
- DET – Chris Houston – 6 tackles, 2 assists

In week 8, the Lions hosted the Seattle Seahawks. Seattle started the scoring with a 23-yard field goal by Steven Hauschka. The Lions then took the lead when Ryan Broyles caught a 6-yard touchdown pass from Matthew Stafford. In the second quarter, the Seahawks scored 2 consecutive touchdowns: first with a Marshawn Lynch 77-yard run, then with a Sidney Rice 9-yard catch from Russell Wilson. The Lions responded with a Titus Young 46-yard touchdown pass from Matthew Stafford. After a scoreless third quarter, the Lions took the lead back when Matthew Stafford ran in a touchdown from 1 yard out. Seattle went up by 3 points with a Zach Miller 16-yard catch from Russell Wilson. The Lions' Titus Young then scored the game-winning touchdown with 1-yard pass from Matthew Stafford. It was the Lions' first win against Seattle since 1999 and would be their last until 2024.

=== Week 9: at Jacksonville Jaguars ===
Week Nine: Detroit Lions at Jacksonville Jaguars – Game summary

Quarter	1	2	3	4	Total
Lions	0	21	0	10	31
Jaguars	0	0	0	14	14

at EverBank Field, Jacksonville, Florida

- Date: November 4
- Game time: 1:00 p.m. EST
- Game weather: 81 °F (27 °C), sunny
- Game attendance: 63,050
- Referee: Gene Steratore
- TV announcers (Fox): Ron Pitts, Mike Martz and Kristina Pink
- Recap
  Gamebook

Game information

First quarter

- No scoring plays

Second quarter

- DET – Mikel Leshoure 7-yard run (Jason Hanson kick), Lions 7–0, Drive: 13 plays, 91 yards, 5:50.
- DET – Mikel Leshoure 1-yard run (Jason Hanson kick), Lions 14–0, Drive: 7 plays, 53 yards, 3:21.
- DET – Mikel Leshoure 8-yard run (Jason Hanson kick), Lions 21–0, Drive: 10 plays, 81 yards, 4:11.

Third quarter

- No scoring plays

Fourth quarter

- DET – Jason Hanson 42-yard field goal, Lions 24–0, Drive: 7 plays, 40 yards, 3:01.
- JAX – Micheal Spurlock 5-yard pass from Blaine Gabbert (Blaine Gabbert pass to Rashad Jennings for two-point conversion), Lions 24–8, Drive: 11 plays, 80 yards, 5:20.
- DET – Joique Bell 10-yard run (Jason Hanson kick), Lions 31–8, Drive: 9 plays, 80 yards, 5:53.
- JAX – Justin Blackmon 6-yard pass from Blaine Gabbert, Lions 31–14, Drive: 12 plays, 72 yards, 1:52.

Top passers

- DET – Matthew Stafford – 22/33, 285 yards
- JAX – Blaine Gabbert – 27/38, 220 yards, 2 touchdowns, 2 interceptions

Top rushers

- DET – Joique Bell – 13 carries, 73 yards, 1 touchdown
- JAX – Rashad Jennings – 12 carries, 45 yards

Top receivers

- DET – Calvin Johnson – 7 receptions, 129 yards
- JAX – Cecil Shorts – 3 receptions, 56 yards

Top tacklers

- DET – Justin Durant – 7 tackles
- JAX – Paul Posluszny – 7 tackles, 1 assist

In week 9, the Lions flew south to play the Jacksonville Jaguars. After a scoreless first quarter, the Lions' Mikel Leshoure ran in three consecutive touchdowns, from 7, 1, and 8 yards out respectively to take a 21-point lead going into halftime. Leshoure became the first Lions rusher to score three touchdowns in the first half. After a scoreless third quarter, Detroit's Jason Hanson kicked a 42-yard field goal. The Jaguars finally got on the board when Micheal Spurlock caught a 5-yard touchdown pass from Blaine Gabbert; they then completed a two-point conversion when Blaine Gabbert completed a pass to Rashad Jennings. The Lions responded with a 10-yard touchdown run from Joique Bell. Jacksonville scored the final points of the game with a 6-yard touchdown catch from Blaine Gabbert to Justin Blackmon; they again went for a two-point conversion, but were unsuccessful this time. It was the Lions' most lopsided win of the season and would also be their final victory of the 2012 season.

=== Week 10: at Minnesota Vikings ===
Week Ten: Detroit Lions at Minnesota Vikings – Game summary

Quarter	1	2	3	4	Total
Lions	0	3	7	14	24
Vikings	10	3	3	18	34

at Hubert H. Humphrey Metrodome, Minneapolis, Minnesota

- Date: November 11
- Game time: 1:00 p.m. EST/12:00 p.m. CST
- Game weather: Played indoors (dome stadium)
- Game attendance: 64,059
- Referee: Pete Morelli
- TV announcers (Fox): Dick Stockton, John Lynch and Jennifer Hale
- Recap
  Gamebook

Game information

First quarter

- MIN – Jarius Wright 3-yard pass from Christian Ponder, (Blair Walsh kick), Vikings 7–0, Drive: 7 plays, 67 yards, 3:31.
- MIN – Blair Walsh 48-yard field goal, Vikings 10–0, Drive: 4 plays, −5 yards, 1:57.

Second quarter

- DET – Jason Hanson 41-yard field goal, Vikings 10–3, Drive: 12 plays, 69 yards, 6:47.
- MIN – Blair Walsh 23-yard field goal, Vikings 13–3, Drive: 13 plays, 81 yards, 6:26.

Third quarter

- MIN – Blair Walsh 23-yard field goal, Vikings 16–3, Drive: 9 plays, 43 yards, 4:53.
- DET – Brandon Pettigrew 16-yard pass from Matthew Stafford (Jason Hanson kick), Vikings 16–10, Drive: 4 plays, 81 yards, 2:16.

Fourth quarter

- MIN – Kyle Rudolph 20-yard pass from Christian Ponder (Adrian Peterson run for two-point conversion), Vikings 24–10, Drive: 8 plays, 62 yards, 3:40.
- DET – Titus Young 1-yard pass from Matthew Stafford (Jason Hanson kick), Vikings 24–17, Drive: 6 plays, 80 yards, 2:43.
- MIN – Adrian Peterson 61-yard run (Blair Walsh kick), Vikings 31–17, Drive: 2 plays, 75 yards, 1:07.
- MIN – Blair Walsh 33-yard field goal, Vikings 34–17, Drive: 5 plays, 30 yards, 3:16.
- DET – Calvin Johnson 11-yard pass from Matthew Stafford (Jason Hanson kick), Vikings 24–34, Drive: 10 plays, 80 yards, 2:43.

Top passers

- DET – Matthew Stafford – 28/42, 329 yards, 3 touchdowns, 1 interception
- MIN – Christian Ponder – 24/42, 221 yards, 2 touchdowns

Top rushers

- DET – Mikel Leshoure – 13 carries, 43 yards
- MIN – Adrian Peterson – 27 carries, 171 yards, 1 touchdown

Top receivers

- DET – Calvin Johnson – 12 receptions, 207 yards, 1 touchdown
- MIN – Jarius Wright – 3 receptions, 65 yards, 1 touchdown

Top tacklers

- DET – Erik Coleman – 7 tackles, 2 assists
- MIN – Antoine Winfield – 7 tackles, 2 assists

In week 10, the Lions traveled to Minneapolis for the rematch against their NFC North rival Minnesota Vikings. Minnesota took an early lead when Jarius Wright caught a 3-yard touchdown pass from Christian Ponder, and added more points when Blair Walsh kicked a 58-yard field goal. In the second quarter, the Lions scored their only points of the first half when Jason Hanson scored a 41-yard field goal. The Vikings responded with a 23-yard field goal by Blair Walsh. After halftime, the Blair Walsh kicked another 23-yard field goal. The Lions responded with a Brandon Pettigrew caught a 16-yard touchdown pass from Matthew Stafford. In the final quarter, Minnesota's Kyle Rudolph caught a 20-yard touchdown pass from Christian Ponder, and Adrian Peterson ran the ball in for a two-point conversion. The Lions responded when Titus Young caught a 1-yard touchdown pass from Matthew Stafford. The Vikings added to their lead when Adrian Peterson completed a 61-yard touchdown run, then Blair Walsh scored a 33-yard field goal. The Lions scored the game's final points when Calvin Johnson caught an 11-yard touchdown pass from Matthew Stafford.

=== Week 11: vs. Green Bay Packers ===
Week Eleven: Green Bay Packers at Detroit Lions – Game summary

Quarter	1	2	3	4	Total
Packers	0	7	7	10	24
Lions	3	7	7	3	20

at Ford Field, Detroit, Michigan

- Date: November 18
- Game time: 1:00 p.m. EST
- Game weather: Played indoors (dome stadium)
- Game attendance: 63,716
- Referee: Ron Winter
- TV announcers (Fox): Joe Buck, Troy Aikman and Pam Oliver
- Recap
  Gamebook

Game information

First quarter

- DET – Jason Hanson 30-yard field goal, Lions 3–0, Drive: 8 plays, 57 yards, 3:08.

Second quarter

- GB – Jermichael Finley 20-yard pass from Aaron Rodgers (Mason Crosby kick), Packers 7–3, Drive: 11 plays, 81 yards, 5:28.
- DET – Mikel Leshoure 1-yard run (Jason Hanson kick), Lions 10–7, Drive: 10 plays, 74 yards, 5:50.

Third quarter

- GB – M. D. Jennings 72-yard interception return (Mason Crosby kick), Packers 14–10, Drive: 1 play, 74 yards, 0:00.
- DET – Calvin Johnson 25-yard pass from Matthew Stafford (Jason Hanson kick), Lions 17–14, Drive: 10 plays, 83 yards, 5:30.

Fourth quarter

- DET – Jason Hanson 27-yard field goal, Lions 20–14, Drive: 9 plays, 63 yards, 4:12.
- GB – Randall Cobb 22-yard pass from Aaron Rodgers (Mason Crosby kick), Packers 21–20, Drive: 6 plays, 82 yards, 2:30.
- GB – Mason Crosby 39-yard field goal, Packers 24–20, Drive: 4 plays, −1 yard, 0:19.

Top passers

- GB – Aaron Rodgers – 19/27, 236 yards, 2 touchdowns, 1 interception
- DET – Matthew Stafford – 17/39, 266 yards, 1 touchdown, 2 interceptions

Top rushers

- GB – James Starks – 25 carries, 74 yards
- DET – Mikel Leshoure – 19 carries, 84 yards, 1 touchdown

Top receivers

- GB – Randall Cobb – 9 receptions, 74 yards, 1 touchdown
- DET – Calvin Johnson – 5 receptions, 143 yards, 1 touchdown

Top tacklers

- GB – Morgan Burnett – 9 tackles, 2 assists
- DET – Stephen Tulloch – 4 tackles, 5 assists

In week 11, the Lions hosted their NFC North Division rivals the Green Bay Packers. The only scoring play of the first quarter was when Detroit's Jason Hanson kicked a 30-yard field goal. The Packers got on the board in the second quarter when Jermichael Finley caught a 20-yard touchdown pass from Aaron Rodgers. The Lions responded with a 1-yard touchdown run by Mikel Leshoure. In the third quarter, the Packers' M. D. Jennings intercepted a Matthew Stafford pass and ran it back 72 yards for a touchdown. The Lions responded with a Calvin Johnson 25-yard touchdown pass from Matthew Stafford. The Lions scored their final points in the fourth quarter when Jason Hanson kicked a 27-yard field goal. The Packers then scored a touchdown when Randall Cobb caught a 22-yard pass from Aaron Rodgers, and capped off their win with a 39-yard field goal by Mason Crosby.

=== Week 12: vs. Houston Texans ===
Week Twelve: Houston Texans at Detroit Lions – Game summary

Quarter	1	2	3	4	OT	Total
Texans	0	14	10	7	3	34
Lions	7	14	3	7	0	31

at Ford Field, Detroit, Michigan

- Date: November 22
- Game time: 12:30 p.m. EST
- Game weather: Played indoors (dome stadium)
- Game attendance: 64,827
- Referee: Walt Coleman
- TV announcers (CBS): Jim Nantz and Phil Simms
- Recap
  Gamebook

Game information

First quarter

- DET – Mikel Leshoure 2-yard run (Jason Hanson kick), Lions 7–0, Drive: 12 plays, 80 yards, 5:02.

Second quarter

- HOU – Arian Foster 6-yard run (Shayne Graham kick), Tied 7–7, Drive: 7 plays, 74 yards, 3:42.
- DET – Mike Thomas 5-yard pass from Matthew Stafford (Jason Hanson kick), Lions 14–7, Drive: 10 plays, 83 yards, 4:57.
- HOU – Owen Daniels 9-yard pass from Matt Schaub (Shayne Graham kick), Tied 14–14, Drive: 8 plays, 75 yards, 3:49.
- DET – Calvin Johnson 22-yard pass from Matthew Stafford (Jason Hanson kick), Lions 21–14, Drive: 2 plays, 59 yards, 0:22.

Third quarter

- DET – Jason Hanson 46-yard field goal, Lions 24–14, Drive: 12 plays, 50 yards, 6:28.
- HOU – Justin Forsett 81-yard run (Shayne Graham kick), Lions 24–21, Drive: 2 plays, 81 yards, 0:28.
- HOU – Shayne Graham 45-yard field goal, Tied 24–24, Drive: 7 plays, 40 yards, 3:00.

Fourth quarter

- DET – Joique Bell 23-yard run (Jason Hanson kick), Lions 31–24, Drive: 8 plays, 80 yards, 4:05.
- HOU – Arian Foster 1-yard run (Shayne Graham kick), Tied 31–31, Drive: 15 plays, 97 yards, 5:43.

Overtime

- HOU – Shayne Graham 32-yard field goal, Texans 34–31, Drive: 6 plays, 49 yards, 2:11.

Top passers

- HOU – Matt Schaub – 29/48, 315 yards, 1 touchdown, 1 interception
- DET – Matthew Stafford – 31/61, 441 yards, 2 touchdowns

Top rushers

- HOU – Arian Foster – 20 carries, 102 yards, 2 touchdowns
- DET – Joique Bell – 5 carries, 47 yards, 1 touchdown

Top receivers

- HOU – Andre Johnson – 9 receptions, 188 yards
- DET – Calvin Johnson – 8 receptions, 140 yards, 1 touchdown

Top tacklers

- HOU – Danieal Manning – 8 tackles, 1 assist
- DET – Stephen Tulloch – 12 tackles, 3 assists

For their annual Thanksgiving Day game, the Lions hosted the Houston Texans. The Lions got on the board early when Mikel Leshoure ran in a touchdown from 2 yards out. The score sea-sawed in the second quarter, with each team scoring a pair of touchdowns. First, the Texans' Arian Foster rushed in a touchdown from 6 yards out. The Lions responded with a 5-yard touchdown run from Mike Foster. Houston's Owen Daniels then caught a 9-yard touchdown pass from Matt Schaub. The Lions' Calvin Johnson then caught a 22-yard touchdown pass. After halftime, Detroit's Jason Hanson kicked a 46-yard field goal. Houston responded with an 81-yard touchdown rush by Justin Forsett, which would have been overturned by an official review, but Coach Jim Schwartz's challenge flag negated the review. The Texans tied it up yet again with a 45-yard field goal by Shayne Graham. In the fourth quarter, the Lions took the lead back with a 23-yard touchdown run by Joique Bell, but Houston tied it back up with a 1-yard run by Arian Foster inside the 2-minute warning to take it to overtime. After a pair of turnovers and missed field goals by each team, Houston's Shayne Graham kicked the game-winning field goal from 32-yards out. It was the Lions' ninth consecutive Thanksgiving loss.

=== Week 13: vs. Indianapolis Colts ===
Week Thirteen: Indianapolis Colts at Detroit Lions – Game summary

Quarter	1	2	3	4	Total
Colts	7	7	7	14	35
Lions	10	13	7	3	33

at Ford Field, Detroit, Michigan

- Date: December 2
- Game time: 1:00 p.m. EST
- Game weather: Played indoors (dome stadium)
- Game attendance: 63,887
- Referee: Bill Vinovich
- TV announcers (CBS): Ian Eagle and Dan Fouts
- Recap
  Gamebook

Game information

First quarter

- DET – Jason Hanson 48-yard field goal, Lions 3–0, Drive: 7 plays, 29 yards, 3:45.
- IND – Donnie Avery 17-yard pass from Andrew Luck (Adam Vinatieri kick), Colts 7–3, Drive: 6 plays, 80 yards, 2:20.
- DET – Brandon Pettigrew 16-yard pass from Matthew Stafford (Jason Hanson kick), Lions 10–7, Drive: 8 plays, 87 yards, 4:41.

Second quarter

- DET – Mikel Leshoure 6-yard run (Jason Hanson kick), Lions 17–7, Drive: 8 plays, 75 yards, 3:50.
- IND – Coby Fleener 26-yard pass from Andrew Luck (Adam Vinatieri kick), Lions 17–14, Drive: 3 plays, 80 yards, 1:40.
- DET – Jason Hanson 33-yard field goal, Lions 20–14, Drive: 4 plays, 5 yards, 0:59.
- DET – Jason Hanson 52-yard field goal, Lions 23–14, Drive: 7 plays, 31 yards, 2:29.

Third quarter

- IND – Vick Ballard 11-yard run (Adam Vinatieri kick), Lions 23–21, Drive: 7 plays, 80 yards, 2:55.
- DET – Calvin Johnson 46-yard pass from Matthew Stafford (Jason Hanson kick), Lions 30–21, Drive: 6 plays, 58 yards, 3:54.

Fourth quarter

- DET – Jason Hanson 31-yard field goal, Lions 33–21, Drive: 5 plays, 57 yards, 2:09.
- IND – LaVon Brazill 42-yard pass from Andrew Luck (Adam Vinatieri kick), Lions 33–28, Drive: 8 plays, 85 yards, 1:23.
- IND – Donnie Avery 14-yard pass from Andrew Luck (Adam Vinatieri kick), Colts 35–33, Drive: 11 plays, 75 yards, 1:07.

Top passers

- IND – Andrew Luck – 24/54, 391 yards, 4 touchdowns, 3 interceptions
- DET – Matthew Stafford – 27/46, 313 yards, 2 touchdowns, 1 interceptions

Top rushers

- IND – Vick Ballard – 9 carries, 41 yards, 1 touchdown
- DET – Joique Bell – 7 carries, 81 yards

Top receivers

- IND – T. Y. Hilton – 6 receptions, 100 yards
- DET – Calvin Johnson – 13 receptions, 171 yards, 1 touchdown

Top tacklers

- IND – Cassius Vaughn – 8 tackles, 1 assist
- DET – Don Carey – 3 tackles, 4 assists

In week 13, the Lions hosted the Indianapolis Colts. They started the scoring when Jason Hanson kicked a 48-yard field goal. The Colts responded with a 17-yard touchdown catch by Donnie Avery from Andrew Luck. Detroit replied when Brandon Pettigrew caught a 16-yard touchdown pass from Matthew Stafford, and added to their lead in the second quarter when Mikel Leshoure ran in a touchdown from 6 yards out. The Colts scored their only points of the second quarter when Coby Fleener caught a 26-yard touchdown pass from Andrew Luck. The Lions closed out the half with 2 field goals from Jason Hanson from 33 and 52 yards out respectively. Each team scored a touchdown in the third quarter. First the Colts' Vick Ballard ran one in from 11 yards out, then Detroit's Calvin Johnson caught 46-yard touchdown pass from Matthew Stafford. The Lions' only points of the final quarter was a 31-yard field goal by Jason Hanson. The Colts then rallied from behind with two touchdowns. First LaVon Brazill caught a 42-yard pass from Andrew Luck, then Donnie Avery caught a 14-yard pass from Andrew Luck in the final seconds of the game for the win. It was the Lions' third consecutive loss in which they were leading with less than 2 minutes left in the game.

=== Week 14 at Green Bay Packers ===
Week Fourteen: Detroit Lions (4–8) at Green Bay Packers (8–4)

Quarter	1	2	3	4	Total
Lions	7	7	3	3	20
Packers	0	10	7	10	27

at Lambeau Field, Green Bay, Wisconsin

- Date: December 9, 2012
- Game time: 7:20 p.m. CST
- Game weather: Snow, 32 °F (0 °C)
- Game attendance: 70,382
- Referee: Tony Corrente
- TV announcers (NBC): Al Michaels, Cris Collinsworth and Michele Tafoya
- Gamebook

Game information

First quarter

- DET – Matthew Stafford 4-yard run (Jason Hanson kick), 7:16. Lions 7–0. Drive: 12 plays, 80 yards, 7:44.

Second quarter

- DET – Tony Scheffler 3-yard pass from Matthew Stafford, (Jason Hanson), 12:47. Lions 14–0. Drive: 11 plays, 79 yards, 5:48.
- GB – Mason Crosby 49-yard field goal, 10:52. Lions 14–3. Drive: 6 plays, 31 yards, 1:55.
- GB – Mike Daniels 43-yard fumble return (Mason Crosby kick), 6:15. Lions 14–10.

Third quarter

- GB – Aaron Rodgers 27-yard run, (Mason Crosby kick) 11:54. Packers 17–14. Drive: 8 plays, 74 yards, 3:06.
- DET – Jason Hanson 46-yard field goal, 8:57. Tie 17–17. Drive: 7 plays, 45 yards, 2:57.

Fourth quarter

- GB – DuJuan Harris 14-yard run (Mason Crosby kick), 10:45. Packers 24–17. Drive: 7 plays, 59 yards, 4:04.
- GB – Mason Crosby 41-yard field goal, 4:02. Packers 27–17. Drive: 7 plays, 40 yards, 3:09.
- DET – Jason Hanson 34-yard field goal, 0:07. Packers 27–20. Drive: 8 plays, 63 yards, 1:52.

Top passers

- DET – Matthew Stafford – 27/45, 264 yards, TD, INT
- GB – Aaron Rodgers – 14/24, 173 yards

Top rushers

- DET – Mikel Leshoure – 14 rushes, 49 yards
- GB – Alex Green – 13 rushes, 69 yards

Top receivers

- DET – Calvin Johnson – 10 receptions, 118 yards
- GB – Randall Cobb – 7 receptions, 102 yards

In week 14, the Lions flew across Lake Michigan for a rematch with NFC North Division rivals the Green Bay Packers on Sunday Night Football. The only scoring drive of the first quarter was when Lions quarterback Matthew Stafford ran in a touchdown himself from 4 yards out. The Lions added more points in the second quarter when Tony Scheffler caught a Matthew Stafford pass from 3 yards out. The Packers got on the board when Mason Crosby kicked a 49-yard field goal, and added more points when Mike Daniels picked up a Matthew Stafford fumble and ran it back 43 yards for a touchdown to make it 14–10 at halftime. In the third quarter, the Packers took their first lead of the game when quarterback Aaron Rodgers ran in a touchdown from 27 yards, but the Lions tied it up a few minutes later when Jason Hanson kicked a 46-yard field goal. In the final quarter, the Packers took the lead back when DuJuan Harris ran in a touchdown from 14 yards out, and went up by 10 points when Mason Crosby kicked a 41-yard field goal. The Lions' Jason Hanson kicked a 34-yard field goal in the final seconds of the game, and the Lions attempted to recover an onside kick afterward to try to tie it up and take it to overtime, but failed. It was the Packers' 21st consecutive home win over the Lions, a streak that dates back to 1992, and now eclipses the Lions' current road losing streak vs the Washington Redskins, which stands at 0–21.

=== Week 15: at Arizona Cardinals ===
Week Fifteen: Detroit Lions at Arizona Cardinals – Game summary

Quarter	1	2	3	4	Total
Lions	0	7	3	0	10
Cardinals	0	21	3	14	38

at University of Phoenix Stadium, Glendale, Arizona

- Date: December 16
- Game time: 4:05 p.m. EST/2:05 p.m. MST
- Game weather: 57 °F (14 °C), sunny, clear skies
- Game attendance: 60,483
- Referee: Jerome Boger
- TV announcers (Fox): Chris Myers, Tim Ryan and Jaime Maggio
- Recap
  Gamebook

Game information

First quarter

- No scoring plays

Second quarter

- DET – Mikel Leshoure 1-yard run (Jason Hanson kick), Lions 7–0, Drive: 11 plays, 73 yards, 5:04.
- ARI – Beanie Wells 5-yard run (Jay Feely kick), Tied 7–7, Drive: 9 plays, 20 yards, 3:22.
- ARI – Beanie Wells 1-yard run (Jay Feely kick), Cardinals 14–7, Drive: 2 plays, 3 yards, 0:41.
- ARI – Rashad Johnson 53-yard interception return (Jay Feely kick), Cardinals 21–7, Drive: 1 play, 53 yards, 0:00.

Third quarter

- ARI – Jay Feely 51-yard field goal, Cardinals 24–7, Drive: 8 plays, 30 yards, 3:28.
- DET – Jason Hanson 41-yard field goal, Cardinals 24–10, Drive: 11 plays, 57 yards, 5:08.

Fourth quarter

- ARI – Greg Toler 102-yard interception return (Jay Feely kick), Cardinals 31–10, Drive: 1 play, 102 yards, 0:00.
- ARI – Beanie Wells 31-yard run (Jay Feely kick), Cardinals 38–10, Drive: 2 plays, 29 yards, 0:13.

Top passers

- DET – Matt Stafford – 24/50, 246 yards, 3 interceptions
- ARI – Ryan Lindley – 14/21, 104 yards, 1 interception

Top rushers

- DET – Mikel Leshoure – 14 carries, 55 yards, 1 touchdown
- ARI – Beanie Wells – 17 carries, 67 yards, 3 touchdowns

Top receivers

- DET – Calvin Johnson – 10 receptions, 121 yards
- ARI – Michael Floyd – 3 receptions, 3 yards

Top tacklers

- DET – Stephen Tulloch – 6 tackles, 4 assists
- ARI – Calais Campbell – 7 tackles, 1 assist, 1 sack

In week 15, the Lions played their last road game of the season out west against the Arizona Cardinals. After a scoreless first quarter, the Lions scored their only points of the first half with a 1-yard touchdown run by Mikel Leshoure. The Cardinals responded with 3 consecutive touchdowns: first, Beanie Wells scored a pair of rushing touchdowns from 5 and 1 yards out respectively, then Rashad Johnson intercepted a Matthew Stafford pass and ran it back 53 yards to put the Cardinals up 21–7 at halftime. Each team kicked a field goal in the third quarter: first the Cardinals' Jay Feely from 51 yards, then Detroit's Jason Hanson from 41 yards. Arizona capped their win with two touchdowns in the final quarter: first Greg Toler intercepted a Matthew Stafford pass in the end zone and ran 102 yards for a touchdown, then Beanie Wells scored his third touchdown of the game, this one from 31 yards out.

=== Week 16: vs. Atlanta Falcons ===
Week Sixteen: Atlanta Falcons at Detroit Lions – Game summary

Quarter	1	2	3	4	Total
Falcons	7	14	0	10	31
Lions	3	3	7	5	18

at Ford Field, Detroit, Michigan

- Date: December 22
- Game time: 8:30 p.m. EST
- Game weather: Played indoors (dome stadium)
- Game attendance: 63,849
- Referee: Gene Steratore
- TV announcers (ESPN): Mike Tirico, Jon Gruden and Lisa Salters
- Recap
  Gamebook

Game information

First quarter

- ATL – Roddy White 44-yard pass from Matt Ryan (Matt Bryant kick), Falcons 7–0, Drive: 4 plays, 69 yards, 2:22.
- DET – Jason Hanson 34-yard field goal, Falcons 7–3, Drive: 11 plays, 58 yards, 5:37.

Second quarter

- ATL – Roddy White 39-yard pass from Matt Ryan (Matt Bryant kick), Falcons 14–3, Drive: 9 plays, 80 yards, 5:19.
- ATL – Julio Jones 16-yard pass from Matt Ryan (Matt Bryant kick), Falcons 21–3, Drive: 7 plays, 40 yards, 2:47.
- DET – Jason Hanson 38-yard field goal, Falcons 21–6, Drive: 7 plays, 65 yards, 1:15.

Third quarter

- DET – Mikel Leshoure 1-yard run (Jason Hanson kick), Falcons 21–13, Drive: 10 plays, 60 yards, 6:36.

Fourth quarter

- DET – Jason Hanson 20-yard field goal, Falcons 21–16, Drive: 12 plays, 83 yards, 6:55.
- ATL – Michael Palmer 1-yard pass from Matt Ryan (Matt Bryant kick), Falcons 28–16, Drive: 11 plays, 78 yards, 6:14.
- ATL – Matt Bryant 20-yard field goal, Falcons 31–16, Drive: 8 plays, 40 yards, 3:58.
- DET – Michael Turner −2-yard run, tackled in own end zone, Falcons 31–18, Drive info: 1 plays, −2 yards, 0:00.

Top passers

- ATL – Matt Ryan – 25/32, 279 yards, 4 touchdowns
- DET – Matthew Stafford – 37/56, 443 yards, 1 interception

Top rushers

- ATL – Michael Turner – 13 carries, 41 yards
- DET – Mikel Leshoure – 15 carries, 46 yards, 1 touchdown

Top receivers

- ATL – Roddy White – 8 receptions, 153 yards, 2 touchdowns
- DET – Calvin Johnson – 11 receptions, 225 yards

Top tacklers

- ATL – Dunta Robinson – 9 tackles, 1 assist
- DET – Louis Delmas – 6 tackles, 3 assists

In week 16, the Lions hosted the Atlanta Falcons on a Saturday night. Atlanta took an early lead, which they never gave back, when Roddy White caught a 44-yard touchdown pass from Matt Ryan. The Lions responded with a 34-yard field goal by Jason Hanson. In the second quarter, the Falcons' Roddy White caught another touchdown pass, this one from 39 yards out. Atlanta added more points when Julio Jones caught a 16-yard touchdown pass. The Lions ended the first half with a 38-yard field goal by Jason Hanson. The only points of the third quarter was a 1-yard touchdown run by Detroit's Mikel Leshoure. The Lions scored another field goal to start the fourth quarter, this one from 20 yards out. The Falcons added 10 more points when Michael Palmer caught a 1-yard touchdown pass, then Matt Bryant kicked a 20-yard field goal. The Lions scored the game's final points when Atlanta's Michael Turner was tackled in his own end zone for a Detroit safety. The game's biggest highlight was when Detroit's Calvin Johnson surpassed Jerry Rice's 1,848-yard single season receiving record from 1995. At the end of the game, Johnson had compiled 1,892 receiving yards on the year.

=== Week 17: vs. Chicago Bears ===
Week Seventeen: Chicago Bears at Detroit Lions – Game summary

Quarter	1	2	3	4	Total
Bears	10	10	3	3	26
Lions	3	7	7	7	24

at Ford Field, Detroit, Michigan

- Date: December 30
- Game time: 1:00 p.m. EST
- Game weather: Played indoors (dome stadium)
- Game attendance: 64,451
- Referee: Bill Leavy
- TV announcers (Fox): Kenny Albert, Daryl Johnston and Tony Siragusa
- Recap
  Gamebook

Game information

First quarter

- DET – Jason Hanson 44-yard field goal, Lions 3–0, Drive: 9 plays, 65 yards, 3:57.
- CHI – Earl Bennett 60-yard pass from Jay Cutler (Olindo Mare kick), Bears 7–3, Drive: 3 plays, 80 yards, 1:21.
- CHI – Olindo Mare 33-yard field goal, Bears 10–3, Drive: 4 plays, 9 yards, 1:27.

Second quarter

- CHI – Matt Forte 1-yard run (Olindo Mare kick), Bears 17–3, Drive: 3 plays, 10 yards, 0:35.
- CHI – Olindo Mare 40-yard field goal, Bears 20–3, Drive: 4 plays, 1 yard, 0:49.
- DET – Kris Durham 25-yard pass from Matthew Stafford (Jason Hanson kick), Bears 20–10, Drive: 12 plays, 80 yards, 1:37.

Third quarter

- DET – Will Heller 10-yard pass from Matthew Stafford (Jason Hanson kick), Bears 20–17, Drive: 9 plays, 80 yards, 3:53.
- CHI – Olindo Mare 28-yard field goal, Bears 23–17, Drive: 4 plays, 3 yards, 1:06.

Fourth quarter

- CHI – Olindo Mare 20-yard field goal, Bears 26–17, Drive: 11 plays, 59 yards, 4:25.
- DET – Brian Robiskie 9-yard pass from Matthew Stafford (Jason Hanson kick), Bears 26–24, Drive: 9 plays, 80 yards, 3:52.

Top passers

- CHI – Jay Cutler – 18/31, 257 yards, 1 touchdown
- DET – Matthew Stafford – 24/42, 272 yards, 3 touchdowns, 1 interception

Top rushers

- CHI – Matt Forte – 24 carries, 103 yards, 1 touchdown
- DET – Mikel Leshoure – 15 carries, 57 yards

Top receivers

- CHI – Earl Bennett – 5 receptions, 109 yards, 1 touchdown
- DET – Calvin Johnson – 5 receptions, 72 yards

Top tacklers

- CHI – Nick Roach – 7 tackles, 1 assist
- DET – Ron Bartell – 6 tackles, 3 assists

For their last game of the season, the Lions hosted a rematch against their NFC North Division rival the Chicago Bears. The Lions took an early lead in the first quarter when Jason Hanson kicked a 44-yard field goal. The Bears then took the lead, which they never gave back, when Earl Bennett caught a 60-yard touchdown pass from Jay Cutler, and added more 3 points when Olindo Mare kicked a 33-yard field goal. The Lions responded when Kris Durham caught a 25-yard touchdown pass from Matthew Stafford to make it 20–10 at halftime. After the intermission, Detroit scored another touchdown, this one with a 10-yard catch by Will Heller from Matthew Stafford. The Bears responded with a pair of field goals by Olindo Mare, first one from 28-yards late in the third quarter, then one from 20 yards out early in the fourth. The Lions scored the final points of the game when Brian Robiskie caught a 9-yard pass from Matthew Stafford. With their eight consecutive loss, the Lions finished their season at 4–12. Also, for the second time under Coach Schwartz's tenure which began in 2009, the team failed to win a single division game. It was also his third losing season.

== Staff ==
2012 Detroit Lions staff
Front office: Owner/chairman – William Clay Ford Sr.; Vice chairman – William Clay Ford Jr.; President – Tom Lewand; Executive vice president of football operations/general manager – Martin Mayhew; Senior personnel executive – James Harris; Vice president of football operations – Cedric Saunders; Vice president of pro personnel – Sheldon White; Director of college scouting – Scott McEwen; Assistant director of college scouting/national scout – Lance Newmark; Assistant director of pro personnel – Miller McCalmon; Assistant director of pro personnel – Charlie Sanders; Head coaches: Head coach – Jim Schwartz; Assistant head coach/defensive coordinator – Gunther Cunningham; Offensive coaches: Offensive coordinator – Scott Linehan; Quarterbacks – Todd Downing; Running backs – Sam Gash; Wide receivers – Shawn Jefferson; Tight ends – Tim Lappano; Offensive line – George Yarno; Assistant offensive line – Jeremiah Washburn; Offensive quality control – Kyle Valero	Defensive coaches: Defensive line – Kris Kocurek; Linebackers – Matt Burke; Assistant linebackers – Bradford Banta; Secondary/third down package – Tim Walton; Defensive assistant/secondary – Marcus Robertson; Special teams coaches: Special teams coordinator – Danny Crossman; Quality control/special teams – Evan Rothstein; Strength and conditioning: Coordinator of physical development – Jason Arapoff; Assistant strength and conditioning – Ted Rath
