= Jim Schwartz =

American football coach (born 1966)

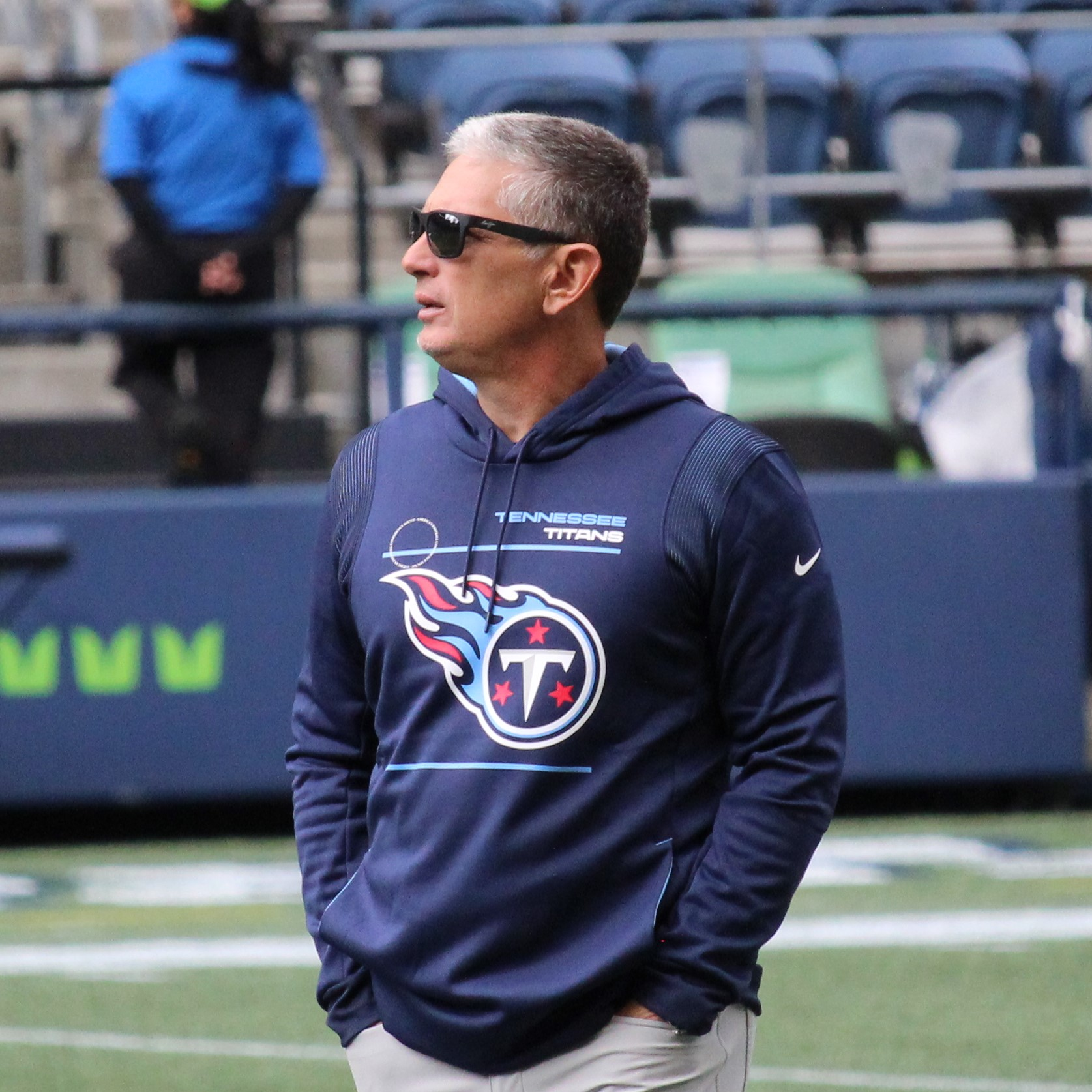
- Schwartz with the Tennessee Titans in 2021

Personal information
- Born: June 2, 1966 (age 60); Halethorpe, Maryland, U.S.

Career information
- Position: Linebacker
- High school: Mount Saint Joseph (Baltimore, Maryland)
- College: Georgetown

Career history

Coaching
- Maryland (1989) Graduate assistant, linebackers; Minnesota (1990) Graduate assistant; North Carolina Central (1991) Secondary coach; Colgate (1992) Linebackers coach; Baltimore Ravens (1996–1998) Outside linebackers coach; Tennessee Titans (1999–2008); Defensive assistant (1999); Linebackers coach (2000); Defensive coordinator (2001–2008); Detroit Lions (2009–2013) Head coach; Buffalo Bills (2014) Defensive coordinator; Philadelphia Eagles (2016–2020) Defensive coordinator; Tennessee Titans (2021–2022) Senior defensive assistant; Cleveland Browns (2023–2025) Defensive coordinator

Operations
- Cleveland Browns (1993–1995) Personnel scout

Awards and highlights
- Super Bowl champion (LII); AP NFL Assistant Coach of the Year (2023)

Head coaching record
- Regular season: 29–51 (.363)
- Postseason: 0–1 (.000)
- Career: 29–52 (.358)
- Coaching profile at Pro Football Reference

James J. Schwartz (born June 2, 1966) is an American professional football coach who most recently served as the defensive coordinator for the Cleveland Browns of the National Football League (NFL). He was head coach of the Detroit Lions from 2009 to 2013. He was also defensive coordinator for the Tennessee Titans from 2001 to 2008, Buffalo Bills in 2014, and Philadelphia Eagles from 2016 to 2020. In addition, Schwartz was the Senior Defensive Assistant for the Titans from 2021 to 2022. He won Super Bowl LII with the Eagles in 2018.

As a defensive-minded coach who emphasizes strong defensive line play, Schwartz is known to build his units around dominant interior linemen. Each of his stints as head coach or defensive coordinator resulted in at least one of his defensive tackles or defensive ends being named to the All-Pro First Team and Pro Bowl such as: Albert Haynesworth in Tennessee, Ndamukong Suh in Detroit, Marcell Dareus and Mario Williams in Buffalo, Fletcher Cox in Philadelphia, and Myles Garrett in Cleveland. Garrett would also win Defensive Player of the Year twice playing under Schwartz's system.

== Early life ==
Schwartz was born just outside Baltimore, Maryland, and attended Mount Saint Joseph High School, an all-male Catholic school, where he played football. Schwartz was a four-year letterman at linebacker for the Hoyas of Georgetown University, where he earned his degree in economics. He received Distinguished Economics Graduate honors at Georgetown and earned numerous honors in 1988, including Division III CoSIDA/GTE Academic All-America, All-America, and team captain.

== Coaching career ==
=== Early coaching career ===
Schwartz got his start in the NFL doing research for Bill Belichick on the Cleveland Browns staff in the mid-1990s. Schwartz served as the Tennessee Titans' defensive coordinator from 2001 to 2008. During his time with Tennessee, Schwartz was considered for several different NFL head coaching openings. He was a candidate for the San Francisco 49ers' head coaching position in 2005, but the job went to Mike Nolan. In January 2008, he interviewed for head coaching positions with the Washington Redskins, Miami Dolphins and Atlanta Falcons. Adam Schefter reported on January 15, 2009, that the Detroit Lions had decided to hire Schwartz as head coach. Defensive tackle Albert Haynesworth, who Schwartz led to stardom in Tennessee, would later call the coordinator a "mastermind" due to the success Haynesworth found in Schwartz's defensive schemes.

=== Detroit Lions ===
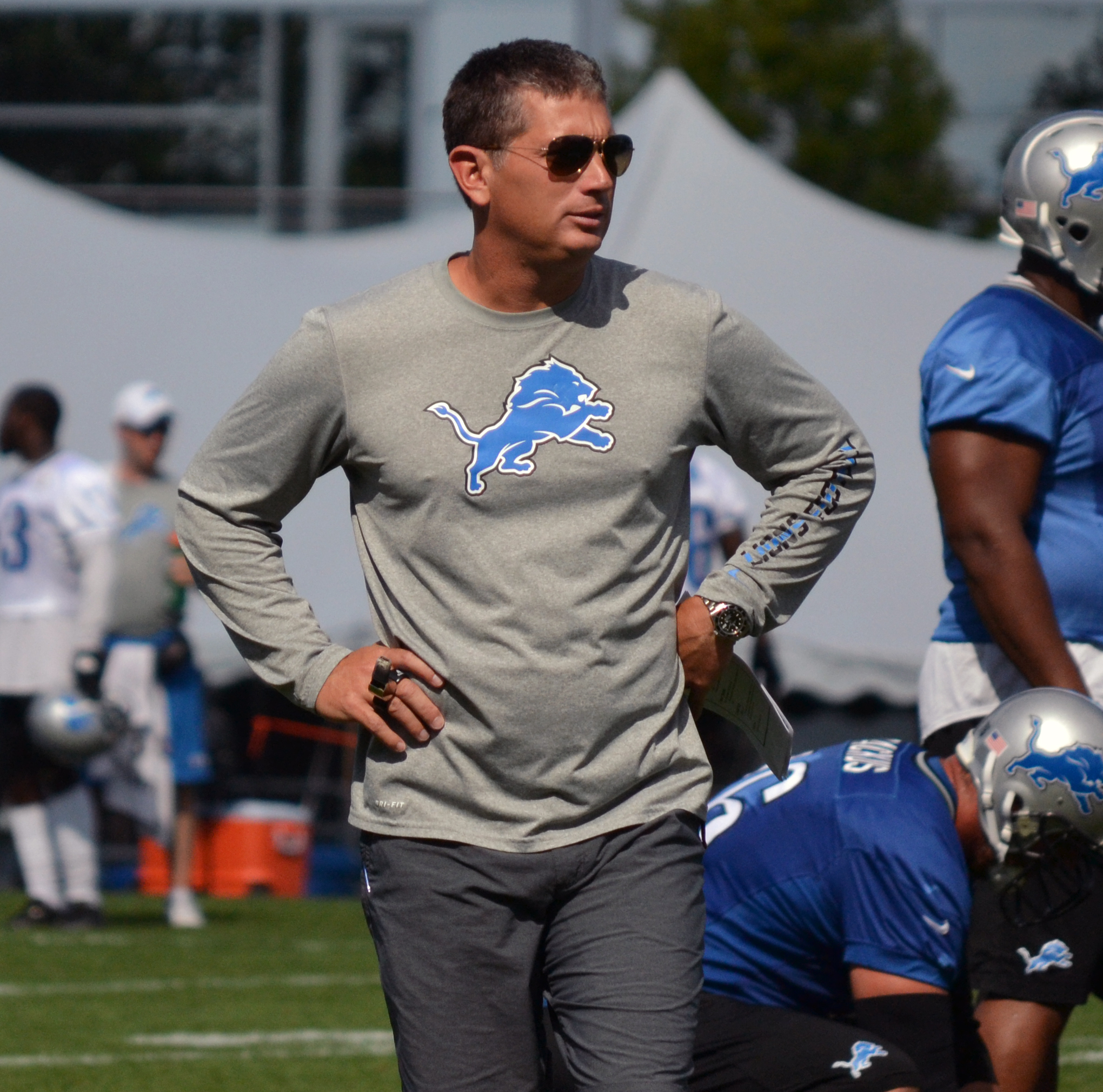
Schwartz with the Detroit Lions in 2012

The 2009 season was Schwartz's first as Detroit's head coach and he posted a 2–14 record, with victories coming against the Washington Redskins and the Cleveland Browns. In 2010, Schwartz saw his Lions begin the season with a 2–10 record, but they finished with four consecutive wins against the Green Bay Packers, Tampa Bay Buccaneers, Miami Dolphins, and Minnesota Vikings. In 2011, the Lions returned to the postseason for the first time since 1999, clinching a playoff berth following a 38–10 victory over the San Diego Chargers. Detroit would go on to be eliminated in the first round by the New Orleans Saints.

The Lions started the 2012 season with a 4–4 record, but they then dropped their final eight games to end the year at 4–12. They finished in last place in the NFC North, as every other division member won at least ten games. Following the season, Schwartz and his staff led the South Team to a 21–16 triumph in the 2013 Senior Bowl. The Lions started the 2013 season with a 6–3 record and gained control of the NFC North, the Lions proceeded to drop six of their next seven games to end the year at 7–9. Schwartz was fired on December 30, 2013, following five seasons as head coach.

=== Buffalo Bills ===
On January 24, 2014, Schwartz was hired by the Buffalo Bills as the defensive coordinator. Schwartz's defense was one of the top defenses statistically in the NFL, and led the league in sacks. During the 2014 season, the Bills went 4–0 against NFC North opponents, which Schwartz had coached against for the previous five seasons. On October 5, 2014, the Bills defeated Schwartz's former team, the Detroit Lions, by a final score of 17–14, in Detroit. Schwartz was carried off the field by his players after the game. Some Lions players, especially Golden Tate, were upset by Schwartz's decision to be carried off the field against his former team. The Bills ended the season fourth in the NFL in points and yards allowed per game with 18.1 and 312.2, respectively, while ranking third in takeaways with 30. The Bills also finished with their first winning record in ten years at 9–7, with defensive linemen Kyle Williams, Marcell Dareus and Mario Williams being named to the Pro Bowl and the latter two being named First-Team All-Pro. Despite the success, head coach Doug Marrone resigned at the end of the season and new Bills coach Rex Ryan decided to bring in his own personnel, rather than retaining Schwartz.

=== Philadelphia Eagles ===
On January 19, 2016, Schwartz was hired by the Philadelphia Eagles to be their defensive coordinator under coach Doug Pederson. Inheriting one of the league's worst defenses, Schwartz made an immediate impact. Implementing his 4-3 defense, Schwartz turned around the defense that previously ranked 30th in yards allowed and 28th in points allowed to 13th and 12th in his first season and fourth in both categories during his second. He eventually led the defense to his and the Eagles' first Super Bowl championship in Super Bowl LII. On January 7, 2021, Schwartz announced that he was going to step away from coaching due to health issues and resigned from the Eagles.

=== Return to Tennessee ===
Schwartz was hired by the Tennessee Titans as a senior defensive assistant on April 7, 2021.

=== Cleveland Browns ===
On January 18, 2023, Schwartz was hired by the Cleveland Browns as the defensive coordinator. In his first season with the Browns, Schwartz's defense led the NFL in multiple categories, including total defense and passing defense. The Browns also allowed an average of 270.2 yards per game, the fewest in a season by a team since the 2014 Seattle Seahawks. Within Schwartz' system, defensive end Myles Garrett would be named 2023 Defensive Player of the Year, and Schwartz was named the 2023 AP NFL Assistant Coach of the Year. Garrett would also set the NFL sack record with 23, in Schwartz's system, winning Defensive Player of the Year again during the 2025 season.

Following the 2025 season and the firing of Kevin Stefanski, Schwartz was one of top candidates to become the new head coach. On February 6, 2026, Schwartz announced his resignation from the Browns as their defensive coordinator with one year left in his contract after the Browns chose to hire Todd Monken as their head coach.

== Consulting career ==
For the 2015 season, Schwartz took a consulting position with the NFL's officiating department to provide a coach's perspective on officiating decisions. On October 6, Schwartz declined the opportunity to replace Miami Dolphins defensive coordinator Kevin Coyle.

== Head coaching record ==
Team	Year	Regular season					Postseason			
Team	Year	Won	Lost	Ties	Win %	Finish	Won	Lost	Win %	Result
DET	2009	2	14	0	.125	4th in NFC North	—	—	—	—
DET	2010	6	10	0	.375	3rd in NFC North	—	—	—	—
DET	2011	10	6	0	.625	2nd in NFC North	0	1	.000	Lost to New Orleans Saints in NFC Wild Card Game
DET	2012	4	12	0	.250	4th in NFC North	—	—	—	—
DET	2013	7	9	0	.438	3rd in NFC North	—	—	—	—
Total		29	51	0	.363		0	1	.000	

== Personal life ==
Schwartz and his wife, Kathy, have twins Christian and Alison, along with a younger daughter, Maria.
