= Jonte Green =

American football player (born 1989)

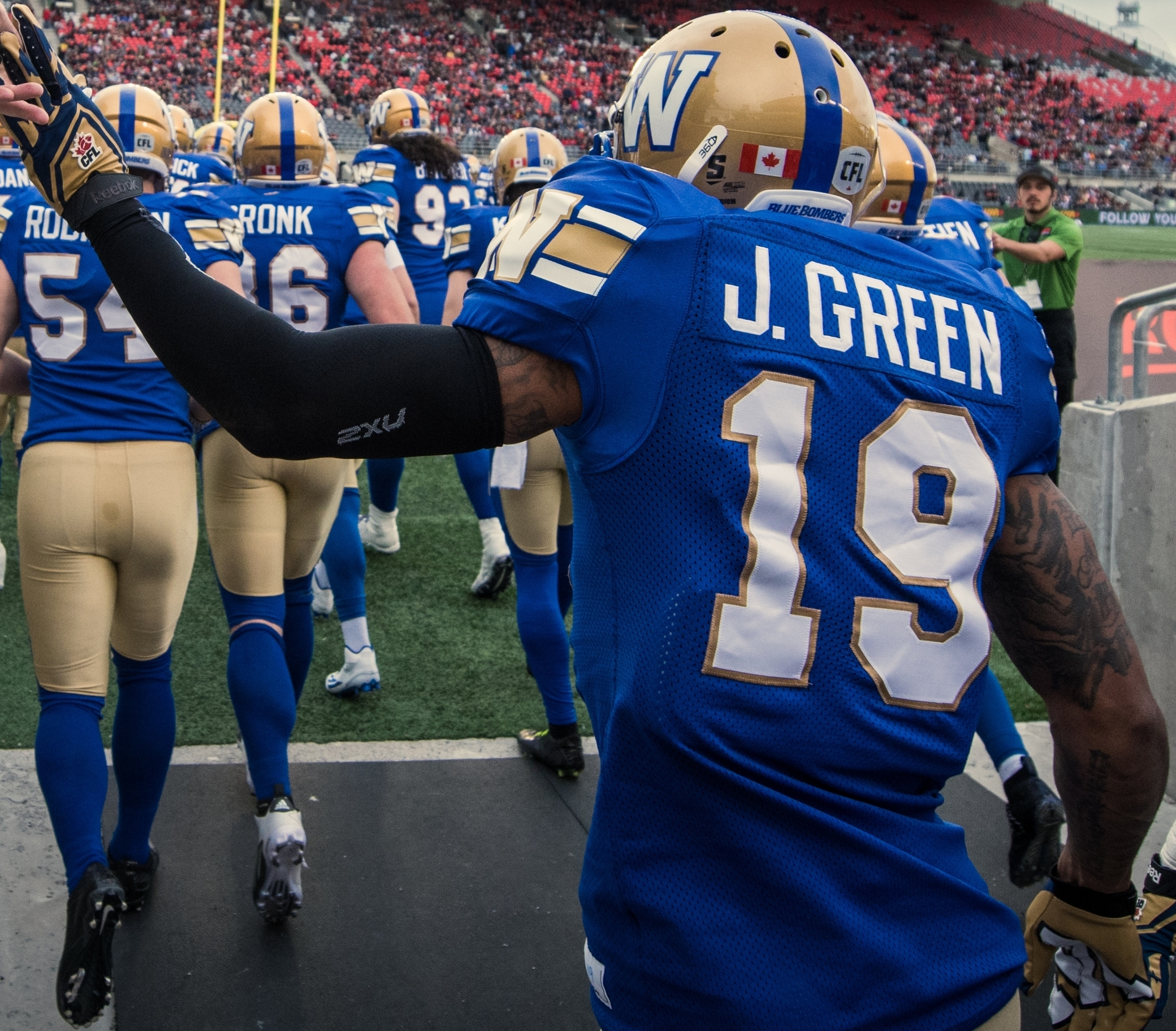
- Green with the Winnipeg Blue Bombers in 2016

No. 19, 36
- Position: Cornerback

Personal information
- Born: July 19, 1989 (age 37); St. Petersburg, Florida, U.S.
- Listed height: 6 ft 0 in (1.83 m)
- Listed weight: 184 lb (83 kg)

Career information
- High school: Lakewood (St. Petersburg)
- College: New Mexico State
- NFL draft: 2012: 6th round, 196th overall pick

Career history
- Detroit Lions (2012−2014); Buffalo Bills (2015)*; Arizona Cardinals (2015)*; Winnipeg Blue Bombers (2016)*; Duke City Gladiators (2017)*; Ottawa Redblacks (2017)*
- * Offseason or practice squad member only

Career NFL statistics
- Total tackles: 38
- Sacks: 1.0
- Pass deflections: 7
- Interceptions: 1
- Stats at Pro Football Reference

Jonte Green (born July 19, 1989) is an American former professional football player who was a cornerback in the National Football League (NFL). He was selected by the Detroit Lions in the sixth round of the 2012 NFL draft. He played college football for the New Mexico State Aggies. He was also a member of the Buffalo Bills, Arizona Cardinals, Winnipeg Blue Bombers, Duke City Gladiators, and Ottawa Redblacks.

== Professional career ==
=== Detroit Lions ===
Green was selected by the Detroit Lions of the NFL in the sixth round of the 2012 NFL draft, 196th overall. Green made an appearance in 24 games over his first two seasons in the NFL, accumulating 38 tackles, seven pass defended, one sack, and one interception. He was released on August 26, 2014, two weeks prior to the start of the 2014 NFL season.

=== Buffalo Bills ===
On January 15, 2015, Green signed a futures contract with the Buffalo Bills. He was waived by the Bills on April 27.

=== Arizona Cardinals ===
The Arizona Cardinals signed Green on August 4, 2015. He was waived on September 5 as part of the final roster cuts before the start of the 2015 season.

=== Winnipeg Blue Bombers ===
Green signed with the Winnipeg Blue Bombers of the Canadian Football League (CFL) on February 22, 2016. He took part in training camp and preseason, but was released by the Bombers on June 18, prior to the start of the regular season.

=== Duke City Gladiators ===
On December 17, 2016, Green signed with the Duke City Gladiators of Champions Indoor Football.

=== Ottawa Redblacks ===
Green signed with the Ottawa Redblacks of the CFL on January 19, 2017. He was released by the Redblacks on May 1, as they trimmed their roster down to 75 players.
