= Chris Greenwood =

American gridiron football player (born 1989)

No. 33
- Position: Cornerback

Personal information
- Born: July 10, 1989 (age 37); Detroit, Michigan, U.S.
- Listed height: 6 ft 1 in (1.85 m)
- Listed weight: 197 lb (89 kg)

Career information
- High school: King (Detroit)
- College: Albion
- NFL draft: 2012: 5th round, 148th overall pick

Career history
- Detroit Lions (2012–2013); Dallas Cowboys (2013); Detroit Lions (2013); Minnesota Vikings (2014)*; Baltimore Ravens (2014−2015); New England Patriots (2015)*; Winnipeg Blue Bombers (2017)*
- * Offseason or practice squad member only

Awards and highlights
- Division III All-American (2011); 3× All-MIAA (2009, 2010, 2011); All-MIAA Defensive MVP (2011)

Career NFL statistics
- Games played: 3
- Stats at Pro Football Reference

Chris Greenwood (born July 10, 1989) is an American former professional football player who was a cornerback in the National Football League (NFL). He played college football for the Albion Britons.

== Early life ==
Greenwood attended Martin Luther King High School, where he was teammates with future NFL player Nick Perry.

Greenwood enrolled at Northwood University, before transferring to Eastern Michigan University.

He enrolled at Division III Albion College for his sophomore season.

As a senior, he contributed to the team winning the conference championship. He finished his college career with 13 interceptions, including 4 returned for touchdowns.

== Professional career ==
=== Detroit Lions (first stint) ===
Greenwood was selected by the Detroit Lions in the fifth round (148th overall) of the 2012 NFL draft. He suffered a torn lower abdomen muscle during OTAs in May, and was forced to begin training camp on the physically unable to perform list. The Lions kept him on the reserve/PUP list during the regular season.

On August 31, 2013, he was released and signed to the practice squad the next day.

=== Dallas Cowboys ===
On September 25, 2013, the Dallas Cowboys signed Greenwood off the Lions' practice squad to provide depth while Morris Claiborne recovered from a shoulder injury. He was declared inactive in all the 3 games he was with the team. On October 15, he was released less than a month later when DeMarcus Ware got hurt and the Cowboys needed help on the defensive line.

=== Detroit Lions (second stint) ===
On October 19, 2013, the Lions quickly signed Greenwood back to their practice squad after he turned down multiple practice squad offers to return to his hometown team. He played in 3 games for the Lions and made 6 tackles. He aggravated his previous injury in the last two games of the season and needed to have a second surgery in the offseason.

In 2014, Greenwood did not adjust well enough to Teryl Austin's new defensive philosophy and missed a significant part of training camp with a strained hamstring. He was released by Detroit in the final cutdowns on August 30.

=== Minnesota Vikings ===
On September 1, 2014, The Minnesota Vikings added him to their practice squad.

=== Baltimore Ravens ===
On December 17, 2014, He was signed to the Baltimore Ravens active roster.

In 2015, he tore his hamstring in the third preseason game against the Washington Redskins. On August 31, he was placed on the injured reserve list. On September 2, he was released by the Ravens with an injury settlement.

=== New England Patriots ===
On November 18, 2015, the New England Patriots signed Greenwood to their practice squad. He was released on December 10.

=== Winnipeg Blue Bombers ===
On February 21, 2017, the Winnipeg Blue Bombers signed Greenwood to a contract. He was released on June 17.

== Personal life ==
Greenwood is the nephew of former NBA players, Barry Wayne Stevens & Jeff Grayer Sr.
