= 2013 Detroit Lions season =

NFL team season

- Owner: William Clay Ford Sr.
- General manager: Martin Mayhew
- Head coach: Jim Schwartz
- Offensive coordinator: Scott Linehan
- Defensive coordinator: Gunther Cunningham
- Home stadium: Ford Field

Results
- Record: 7–9
- Division place: 3rd NFC North
- Playoffs: Did not qualify
- All-Pros: DT Ndamukong Suh (1st team); WR Calvin Johnson (1st team)
- Pro Bowlers: DT Ndamukong Suh; WR Calvin Johnson

Uniform
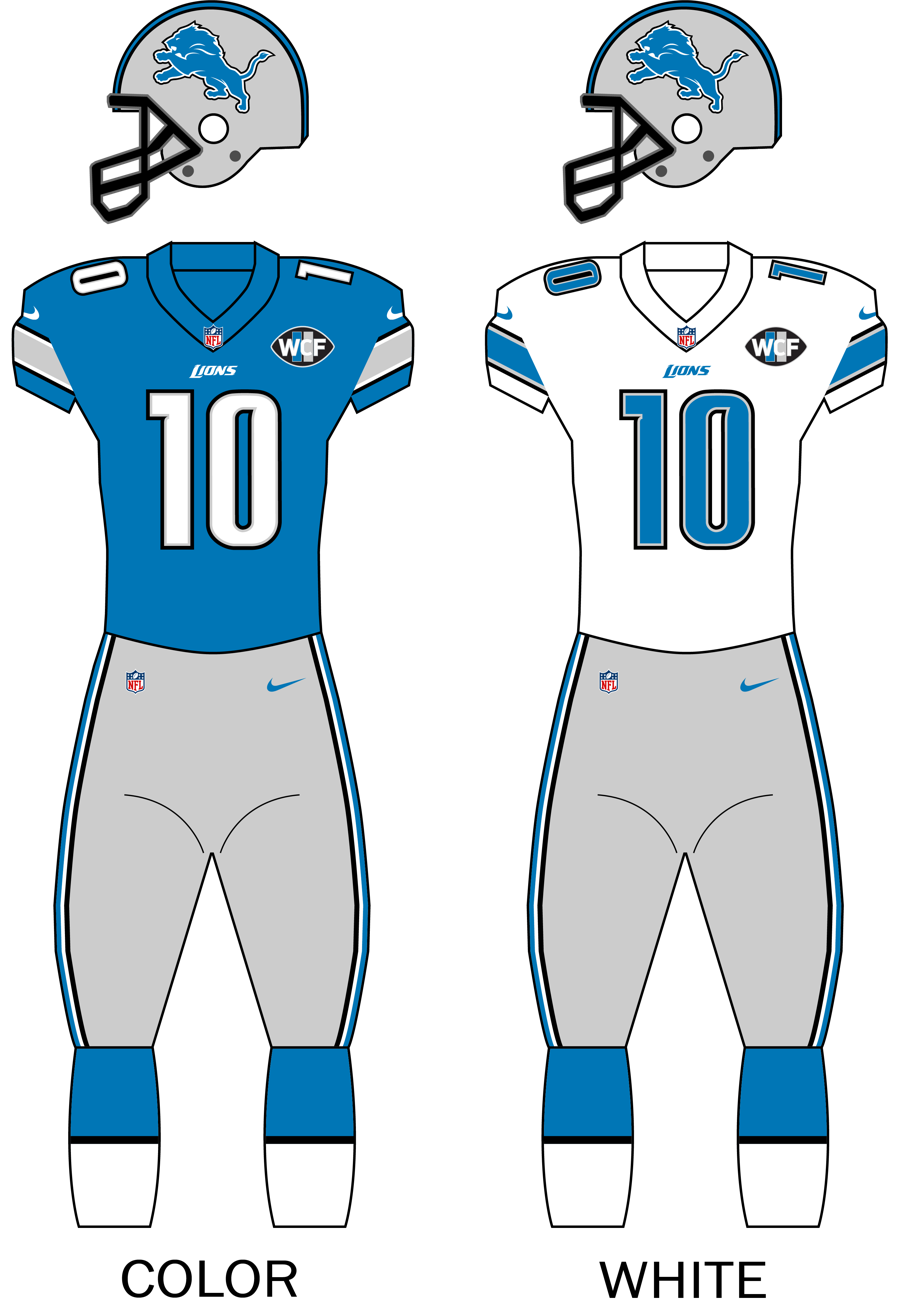

The 2013 season was the Detroit Lions' 84th in the National Football League (NFL), their 80th as the Detroit Lions, as well as their fifth and final season under head coach Jim Schwartz, who was fired on December 30. It was also the final season under the ownership of William Clay Ford Sr., who died in March 2014.

The Lions improved upon their 4–12 record from 2012 when they defeated the Dallas Cowboys in Week 8 to go to 5–3 on the season. Also, their divisional record improved significantly from 2012 (when they were swept by all their divisional rivals).

At the end of Week 10, the Lions were in first place in their division following their first win at Soldier Field since 2007. With their Thanksgiving Day win over the Green Bay Packers, the Lions not only won their first Thanksgiving Day game since 2003, but they also went undefeated in division home games for the first time since 1999.

However despite starting 6–3, the Lions suffered a late-season collapse, as the Lions dropped to third place after their loss to the Ravens in Week 15, and then they were eliminated from postseason contention for the second straight year after their loss to the New York Giants in Week 16. They lost their last game as well, and lost their final 3 games by a combined 6 points. The Lions lost many close games this season, with 6 out of their 9 losses being by a touchdown or less. They ended the season at 7–9.

== Offseason ==
=== Re-signings ===
Date	Player	Position	Contract	Source
March 12	Corey Hilliard	Offensive tackle	2 years / $2.53 million	
March 12	Kassim Osgood	Wide receiver	1 year / –	
March 12	Ashlee Palmer	Linebacker	2 years / $3.25 million	
March 12	Amari Spievey	Safety	1 year / $630,000	
March 13	DeAndre Levy	Linebacker	3 years / $9.75 million	
March 13	Chris Houston	Cornerback	5 years / $25.00 million	
March 14	Don Muhlbach	Long snapper	1 year / $905,000	
March 15	Louis Delmas	Safety	2 years / $8.59 million	
March 15	Dylan Gandy	Guard	1 year / $905,000	
April 15	Brian Robiskie	Wide receiver	1 year / $715,000	
April 15	Willie Young	Defensive end	1 year / $1.323 million	
April 15	Jason Curtis Fox	Offensive lineman	1 year / $1.323 million	
April 15	Joique Bell	Running back	1 year / $630,000	
April 15	Ricard Silva	Free safety	1 year / $555,000	
April 15	Shaun Chapas	Fullback	1 year / $555,000	
April 15	Kris Durham	Wide receiver	1 year / $555,000	
July 7	Matthew Stafford	Quarterback	3 years / $53 million	

=== Additions ===
Date	Player	Position	Previous team	Contract	Source
March 12	Reggie Bush	Running back	Miami Dolphins	4 years / $16.00 million	
March 12	Jason Jones	Defensive tackle	Seattle Seahawks	3 years / $9.50 million	
March 12	Glover Quin	Safety	Houston Texans	5 years / $23.50 million	
March 12	Devin Thomas	Wide receiver	Chicago Bears	1 year / $715,000	
April 3	C. J. Mosley	Defensive lineman	Jacksonville Jaguars	2 years / $2.75 million	
April 5	David Akers	Placekicker	San Francisco 49ers	1 year / $1.005 million	
April 11	Håvard Rugland	Placekicker	Undrafted free agent	3 years / $1.485 million	
April 27	Skyler Allen	Center	Ohio	Undrafted FA	
April 27	Mic'hael Brooks	Defensive tackle	East Carolina	Undrafted FA	
April 27	Alex Carder	Quarterback	Western Michigan	Undrafted FA	
April 27	Joseph Fauria	Tight end	UCLA	Undrafted FA	
April 27	Austin Holtz	Offensive tackle	Ball State	Undrafted FA	
April 27	Steven Miller	Running back	Appalachian State	Undrafted FA	
April 27	Jon Morgan	Linebacker	Albany	Undrafted FA	
April 27	Martavius Neloms	Cornerback	Kentucky	Undrafted FA	
April 27	Travis Tarpley	Wide receiver	Delaware State	Undrafted FA	
April 27	LaAdrian Waddle	Offensive tackle	Texas Tech	Undrafted FA	
April 27	Cody Wilson	Wide receiver	Central Michigan	Undrafted FA	
April 28	Alex Elkins	Linebacker	Oklahoma State	Undrafted FA	
April 28	Marvin Booker	Defensive end	Rutgers	Undrafted FA	

=== Retirements ===
Date	Player	Position	Source
March 14	Jeff Backus	Offensive tackle	
April 4	Jason Hanson	Placekicker	

=== Departures ===
Date	Player	Position	Note	New team	Source
February 4	Titus Young	Wide receiver	Released		
March 12	Gosder Cherilus	Offensive tackle	UFA	Indianapolis Colts	
March 13	Drayton Florence	Cornerback	UFA	Carolina Panthers	
March 13	Sammie Lee Hill	Defensive tackle	UFA	Tennessee Titans	
March 25	Kevin Barnes	Cornerback	UFA	Cleveland Browns	
March 26	Justin Durant	Linebacker	UFA	Dallas Cowboys	
April 27	Stephen Peterman	Offensive guard	Released	New York Jets	
April 28	Cliff Avril	Defensive end	UFA	Seattle Seahawks	
April 28	Kyle Vanden Bosch	Defensive end	UFA		
April 28	Lawrence Jackson	Defensive end	UFA	Minnesota Vikings	
July 17	Jahvid Best	Running back	Released		

=== 2013 Draft class ===
Draft order			Player name	Position	College	Contract	Notes	Source	
Round	Choice	Overall	Player name	Position	College	Contract	Notes	Source	
1	5	5	Ezekiel Ansah	Defensive end	BYU	5 years /			
2	4	36	Darius Slay	Defensive back	Mississippi State	4 years /			
3	3	65	Larry Warford	Offensive lineman	Kentucky	4 years /			
4	5	102	Traded to the Minnesota Vikings				Vikings traded to Patriots		
4	35	132	Devin Taylor	Defensive end	South Carolina	4 years /	Compensatory		
5	4	137	Traded to the Seattle Seahawks						
5	32	165	Sam Martin	Punter	Appalachian State	4 years /	from Seahawks		
6	3	171	Corey Fuller	Wide receiver	Virginia Tech	4 years / $2.283 million			
6	31	199	Theo Riddick	Running back	5 ft 10 in	205 lbs	Notre Dame	4 years / $2.25 million	from 49ers via Seahawks
7	5	211	Michael Williams	Tight end	Alabama	4 years / $2.22 million			
7	39	245	Brandon Hepburn	Linebacker	Florida A&M	4 years / $2.205 million	Compensatory		

Notes

- The Lions traded their original fourth-round selection (No. 102 overall) along with a 2012 seventh-round selection to the Minnesota Vikings in exchange for the Vikings' 2012 fifth- and seventh-round selections.
- The Lions received two compensatory selections – Nos. 132 and 245 overall.

== Final roster ==
2013 Detroit Lions roster
Quarterbacks (QB): 14 Shaun Hill; 17 Kellen Moore; 9 Matthew Stafford; Running backs (RB): 35 Joique Bell; 21 Reggie Bush; 25 Mikel Leshoure; 41 Theo Riddick; Wide receivers (WR): 13 Nate Burleson; 18 Kris Durham; 81 Calvin Johnson; 11 Kevin Ogletree; 12 Jeremy Ross; 15 Micheal Spurlock; Tight ends (TE): 80 Joseph Fauria; 82 Matt Veldman	Offensive linemen (OL): 74 Rodney Austin G; 70 Jason Fox T; 65 Dylan Gandy C/G; 64 Leroy Harris C; 78 Corey Hilliard T; 51 Dominic Raiola C; 71 Riley Reiff T; 67 Rob Sims G; 66 LaAdrian Waddle T; 75 Larry Warford G; Defensive linemen (DL): 94 Ezekiel Ansah DE; 98 Nick Fairley DT; 96 Andre Fluellen DT; 99 C. J. Mosley DT; 90 Ndamukong Suh DT; 92 Devin Taylor DE; 79 Willie Young DE	Linebackers (LB): 54 DeAndre Levy OLB; 52 Rocky McIntosh OLB; 58 Ashlee Palmer OLB; 49 Julian Stanford MLB; 55 Stephen Tulloch MLB; 59 Tahir Whitehead OLB; Defensive backs (DB): 28 Bill Bentley CB; 32 Don Carey FS; 26 Louis Delmas FS; 24 DeJon Gomes SS; 36 Jonte Green CB; 33 Chris Greenwood CB; 23 Chris Houston CB; 31 Rashean Mathis CB; 47 Akwasi Owusu-Ansah CB; 27 Glover Quin SS; 30 Darius Slay CB; 29 John Wendling SS; Special teams (ST): 2 David Akers K; 6 Sam Martin P; 48 Don Muhlbach LS	Practice squad: 83 Patrick Edwards WR (IR); 10 Corey Fuller WR; 57 Brandon Hepburn LB; 16 Carlin Isles RB; 40 Steven Miller RB; 69 Xavier Proctor DT; 63 Jimmy Saddler-McQueen DT; 1 Cody Wilson WR; Reserve: 84 Ryan Broyles WR (IR); 82 Dorin Dickerson TE (IR); 53 Cory Greenwood MLB (IR); 77 Israel Idonije DE (IR); 91 Jason Jones DE (IR); 50 Travis Lewis MLB (Susp.); 34 Montell Owens RB (IR); 87 Brandon Pettigrew TE (IR); 89 Michael Williams TE (IR); Rookies in italics 53 active, 10 reserve, 7 practice squad

== Staff ==
2013 Detroit Lions staff
Front office: Owner/chairman – William Clay Ford Sr.; Vice chairman – William Clay Ford Jr.; President – Tom Lewand; Executive vice president of football operations/general manager – Martin Mayhew; Senior personnel executive – James Harris; Vice president of football operations – Cedric Saunders; Vice president of pro personnel – Sheldon White; Director of college scouting – Scott McEwen; Assistant director of college scouting/national scout – Lance Newmark; Assistant director of pro personnel – Miller McCalmon; Assistant director of pro personnel – Charlie Sanders; Head coaches: Head coach – Jim Schwartz; Assistant head coach/defensive coordinator – Gunther Cunningham; Offensive coaches: Offensive coordinator – Scott Linehan; Quarterbacks – Todd Downing; Running backs – Curtis Modkins; Wide receivers – Tim Lappano; Tight ends – Bobby Johnson; Offensive line – Jeremiah Washburn; Offensive quality control – Kyle Valero	Defensive coaches: Defensive line – Kris Kocurek; Linebackers – Matt Burke; Assistant linebackers – Bradford Banta; Secondary – Marcus Robertson; Defensive assistant – Jim Washburn; Defensive assistant – Brandon Fisher; Special teams coaches: Special teams coordinator – John Bonamego; Quality control/special teams – Evan Rothstein; Strength and conditioning: Coordinator of physical development – Jason Arapoff; Assistant strength and conditioning – Ted Rath

== Preseason ==
=== Schedule ===
Week	Date	Opponent	Result	Record	Venue	Recap
1	August 9	New York Jets	W 26–17	1–0	Ford Field	Recap
2	August 15	at Cleveland Browns	L 6–24	1–1	FirstEnergy Stadium	Recap
3	August 22	New England Patriots	W 40–9	2–1	Ford Field	Recap
4	August 29	at Buffalo Bills	W 35–13	3–1	Ralph Wilson Stadium	Recap

== Regular season ==
=== Schedule ===
Week	Date	Opponent	Result	Record	Venue	Recap
1	September 8	**Minnesota Vikings**	**W** 34–24	1–0	Ford Field	Recap
2	September 15	at Arizona Cardinals	**L** 21–25	1–1	University of Phoenix Stadium	Recap
3	September 22	at Washington Redskins	**W** 27–20	2–1	FedExField	Recap
4	September 29	**Chicago Bears**	**W** 40–32	3–1	Ford Field	Recap
5	October 6	at **Green Bay Packers**	**L** 9–22	3–2	Lambeau Field	Recap
6	October 13	at Cleveland Browns	**W** 31–17	4–2	FirstEnergy Stadium	Recap
7	October 20	Cincinnati Bengals	**L** 24–27	4–3	Ford Field	Recap
8	October 27	Dallas Cowboys	**W** 31–30	5–3	Ford Field	Recap
9	Bye					
10	November 10	at **Chicago Bears**	**W** 21–19	6–3	Soldier Field	Recap
11	November 17	at Pittsburgh Steelers	**L** 27–37	6–4	Heinz Field	Recap
12	November 24	Tampa Bay Buccaneers	**L** 21–24	6–5	Ford Field	Recap
13	November 28	**Green Bay Packers**	**W** 40–10	7–5	Ford Field	Recap
14	December 8	at Philadelphia Eagles	**L** 20–34	7–6	Lincoln Financial Field	Recap
15	December 16	Baltimore Ravens	**L** 16–18	7–7	Ford Field	Recap
16	December 22	New York Giants	**L** 20–23 (OT)	7–8	Ford Field	Recap
17	December 29	at **Minnesota Vikings**	**L** 13–14	7–9	Hubert H. Humphrey Metrodome	Recap

Note: Intra-division opponents are in bold.

=== Game summaries ===
==== Week 1: vs. Minnesota Vikings ====
Week 1: Minnesota Vikings at Detroit Lions – Game summary

Quarter	1	2	3	4	Total
Vikings	7	7	10	0	**24**
**Lions**	3	10	14	7	**34**

at Ford Field, Detroit, Michigan

- Date: September 8
- Game time: 1:00 p.m. EDT
- Game weather: None (indoor stadium)
- Game attendance: 62,461
- Referee: John Parry
- TV announcers (Fox): Thom Brennaman, Brian Billick and Laura Okmin
- Recap, Game book

Game information

**First quarter**

- MIN – Adrian Peterson 78-yard run (Blair Walsh kick), 10:39. Vikings 7–0. **Drive: 1 play, 78 yards, 0:13.**
- DET – David Akers 33-yard field goal, 4:55. Vikings 7–3. **Drive: 10 plays, 65 yards, 5:44.**

**Second quarter**

- DET – David Akers 42-yard field goal, 14:47. Vikings 7–6. **Drive: 7 plays, 25 yards, 3:08.**
- MIN – Adrian Peterson 4-yard run (Blair Walsh kick), 12:17. Vikings 14–6. **Drive: 4 plays, 65 yards, 1:36.**
- DET – Joique Bell 2-yard run (David Akers kick), 0:10. Vikings 14–13. **Drive: 8 plays, 70 yards, 2:04.**

**Third quarter**

- DET – Joique Bell 1-yard run (David Akers kick), 10:19. Lions 20–14. **Drive: 7 plays, 50 yards, 2:44.**
- MIN – Blair Walsh 52-yard field goal, 6:42. Lions 20–17. **Drive: 7 plays, 46 yards, 3:37.**
- DET – Reggie Bush 77-yard pass from Matthew Stafford (David Akers kick), 5:45. Lions 27–17. **Drive: 3 plays, 80 yards, 0:57.**
- MIN – Adrian Peterson 4-yard pass from Christian Ponder (Blair Walsh kick), 1:37. Lions 27–24. **Drive: 8 plays, 78 yards, 4:08.**

**Fourth quarter**

- DET – Joseph Fauria 1-yard pass from Matthew Stafford (David Akers kick), 6:47. Lions 34–24. **Drive: 8 plays, 39 yards, 4:36.**

**Top passers**

- MIN – Christian Ponder – 18/28, 236 yards, TD, 3 INT
- DET – Matthew Stafford – 28/43, 357 yards, 2 TD, INT

**Top rushers**

- MIN – Adrian Peterson – 18 rushes, 93 yards, 2 TD
- DET – Reggie Bush – 21 rushes, 90 yards

**Top receivers**

- MIN – Jerome Simpson – 7 receptions, 140 yards
- DET – Reggie Bush – 4 receptions, 101 yards, TD

The Vikings scored first, and quickly. After the Lions failed on a field goal attempt when new punter/holder Sam Martin fumbled the snap, the Vikings took over on their own 22. On the first play from scrimmage, Adrian Peterson scampered 78 yards for a touchdown. David Akers made it 7–3 on a 33-yard field goal, though the Lions missed out on seven points that series when a touchdown reception by Calvin Johnson was reversed. In the second quarter, Akers connected on a 42-yard field goal to make the score 7–6. The Vikings responded with a 65-yard touchdown drive, capped by a 4-yard TD run from Peterson, to go up 14–6. The Lions closed the gap late in the half when Joique Bell finished off a 70-yard drive with a 1-yard run to make it 14–13. Bell plunged over from the 1-yard line again in the third quarter to put the Lions up for the first time in the game, 20–14. The Vikings' Blair Walsh narrowed the lead to 20–17 with a 52-yard field goal. The Lions then went up 27–17 when Matthew Stafford and new acquisition Reggie Bush connected on a 77-yard pass play. Adrian Peterson scored his third touchdown of the day, on a 4-yard pass from Christian Ponder, to put the Vikings within 3 points again, 27–24. The Lions got the only score of the fourth quarter, a 1-yard touchdown pass from Stafford to rookie tight end Joseph Fauria, making the final score Detroit 34, Minnesota 24. Reggie Bush had 191 yards from scrimmage on the afternoon (90 rushing, 101 receiving), while Matthew Stafford was 28-of-43 passing for 357 yards, two touchdowns and one interception. After Adrian Peterson's opening 78-yard run, the Lions defense held him to just 15 yards on 17 carries.

==== Week 2: at Arizona Cardinals ====
Week 2: Detroit Lions at Arizona Cardinals – Game summary

Quarter	1	2	3	4	Total
Lions	0	14	7	0	**21**
**Cardinals**	0	10	6	9	**25**

at University of Phoenix Stadium, Glendale, Arizona

- Date: September 15
- Game time: 4:05 pm. EDT/1:05 pm. Arizona time
- Game weather: None (retractable roof closed)
- Game attendance: 63,400
- Referee: Pete Morelli
- TV announcers (Fox): Sam Rosen, Heath Evans and Molly McGrath
- Recap, Game book

Game information

**First quarter**

- No scoring plays.

**Second quarter**

- ARI – Jay Feely 47-yard field goal, 11:44. Cardinals 3–0. **Drive: 5 plays, 23 yards, 2:40.**
- DET – Calvin Johnson 72-yard pass from Matthew Stafford (David Akers kick), 10:20. Lions 7–3. **Drive: 3 plays, 80 yards, 1:24.**
- ARI – Andre Ellington 36-yard pass from Carson Palmer (Jay Feely kick), 7:32. Cardinals 10–7. **Drive: 6 plays, 80 yards, 2:48.**
- DET – Calvin Johnson 3-yard pass from Matthew Stafford (David Akers kick), 1:55. Lions 14–10. **Drive: 10 plays, 92 yards, 5:37.**

**Third quarter**

- ARI – Jay Feely 23-yard field goal, 10:32. Lions 14–13. **Drive: 4 plays, 2 yards, 1:22.**
- DET – DeAndre Levy 66-yard interception return (David Akers kick), 7:04. Lions 21–13.
- ARI – Jay Feely 43-yard field goal, 4:13. Lions 21–16. **Drive: 7 plays, 55 yards, 2:51.**

**Fourth quarter**

- ARI – Jay Feely 33-yard field goal, 14:17. Lions 21–19. **Drive: 9 plays, 59 yards, 3:21.**
- ARI – Rashard Mendenhall 1-yard run (pass failed), 1:59. Cardinals 25–21. **Drive: 7 plays, 61 yards, 2:29.**

**Top passers**

- DET – Matthew Stafford – 24/36, 278 yards, 2 TD
- ARI – Carson Palmer – 22/39, 248 yards, TD, INT

**Top rushers**

- DET – Joique Bell – 8 rushes, 31 yards
- ARI – Rashard Mendenhall – 15 rushes, 66 yards, TD

**Top receivers**

- DET – Calvin Johnson – 6 receptions, 116 yards, 2 TD
- ARI – Andre Ellington – 2 receptions, 42 yards, TD

After a scoreless first quarter, the Cardinals struck first on a Jay Feely 47-yard field goal. The Lions responded with a 72-yard touchdown pass from Matthew Stafford to Calvin Johnson, to take a 7–3 lead. The Cardinals went up 10–7 on a 36-yard TD pass from Carson Palmer to Andre Ellington. The Lions retook the lead, 14–10, when Stafford and Johnson connected again, this time on a 3-yard TD pass. Arizona scored first in the third quarter, capitalizing on a Lions turnover with a 23-yard Jay Feely field goal. The Lions got a turnover of their own, as DeAndre Levy returned an interception 66 yards for a touchdown, making the score 21–13. The Cardinals finished the third quarter scoring with a 43-yard Feely field goal to close the score to 21–16. Feely hit again from 33 yards early in the fourth quarter to make the score 21–19. A pass interference penalty by Bill Bentley put the ball on the Lions 1-yard line late in the final quarter, and Arizona's Rashard Mendenhall plunged over two plays later for a touchdown. Arizona failed on a 2-point conversion, making the final score Cardinals 25, Lions 21. Matthew Stafford was 24-of-36 passing for 278 yards and two touchdowns. Calvin Johnson led all receivers with 6 receptions for 116 yards and two touchdowns. David Akers missed a 47-yard field goal, and had another field goal attempt blocked.

==== Week 3: at Washington Redskins ====
Week 3: Detroit Lions at Washington Redskins – Game summary

Quarter	1	2	3	4	Total
**Lions**	7	10	0	10	**27**
Redskins	7	7	3	3	**20**

at FedExField, Landover, Maryland

- Date: September 22
- Game time: 1:00 pm. EDT
- Game weather: Sunny, 72 °F (22 °C)
- Game attendance: 80,111
- Referee: Ed Hochuli
- TV announcers (Fox): Dick Stockton, Ronde Barber and Kris Budden
- Recap, Game book

Game information

**First quarter**

- WAS – DeAngelo Hall 17-yard interception return (John Potter kick), 9:31. Redskins 7–0.
- DET – Joique Bell 12-yard run (David Akers kick), 5:20. Tied 7–7. **Drive: 8 plays, 85 yards, 4:09.**

**Second quarter**

- DET – Joseph Fauria 5-yard pass from Matthew Stafford (David Akers kick), 14:53. Lions 14–7. **Drive: 10 plays, 92 yards, 3:52.**
- WAS – Alfred Morris 30-yard run (John Potter kick), 3:38. Tied 14–14. **Drive: 7 plays, 72 yards, 3:24.**
- DET – David Akers 32-yard field goal, 0:49. Lions 17–14. **Drive: 9 plays, 66 yards, 2:45.**

**Third quarter**

- WAS – John Potter 43-yard field goal, 12:16. Tied 17–17. **Drive: 6 plays, 35 yards, 2:49.**

**Fourth quarter**

- DET – David Akers 28-yard field goal, 11:13. Lions 20–17. **Drive: 6 plays, 65 yards, 1:30.**
- DET – Calvin Johnson 11-yard pass from Matthew Stafford (David Akers kick), 4:02. Lions 27–17. **Drive: 9 plays, 71 yards, 4:19.**
- WAS – John Potter 21-yard field goal, 1:44. Lions 27–20. **Drive: 13 plays, 72 yards, 2:16.**

**Top passers**

- DET – Matthew Stafford – 25/42, 385 yards, 2 TD, INT
- WAS – Robert Griffin III – 32/50, 326 yards, INT

**Top rushers**

- DET – Joique Bell – 20 rushes, 63 yards, TD
- WAS – Alfred Morris – 15 rushes, 73 yards, TD

**Top receivers**

- DET – Nate Burleson – 6 receptions, 116 yards
- WAS – Santana Moss – 7 receptions, 77 yards

Washington took a 7–0 lead in the first quarter when DeAngelo Hall intercepted a Matthew Stafford pass and returned it 17 yards for a touchdown. Detroit tied it on the next possession, when Joique Bell capped an 85-yard drive with a 12-yard TD run. Early in the second quarter, Stafford hit tight end Joseph Fauria with a 5-yard TD pass, putting the Lions up 14–7. A 72-yard Redskins scoring drive was punctuated by an Alfred Morris 30-yard TD run, knotting the score at 14–14. Near the end of the first half, David Akers connected on a 32-yard field goal, sending the Lions to the locker room with a 17–14 lead. The only score of the third quarter came on a John Potter 43-yard field goal, tying the score again at 17–17. The Lions went up 20–17 early in the fourth quarter on a 28-yard field goal from Akers. The Redskins appeared to take the lead on a 57-yard TD pass from Robert Griffin III to Aldrick Robinson, but the play was reversed when replays revealed that Robinson did not maintain possession of the ball when he tumbled to the ground. The Lions took advantage on their next drive, when Stafford hit Calvin Johnson with an 11-yard TD pass, increasing the lead to 27–17. The Redskins got a late 21-yard field goal from John Potter to close the gap to 27–20, but could not gain possession on the ensuing onside kickoff. Matthew Stafford passed for 385 yards and two touchdowns on the day. Nate Burleson led all receivers with 116 yards, while Calvin Johnson tallied 115 receiving yards. Prior to this victory, the Lions had never won a game in Washington, D.C., covering 21 road meetings against the Redskins. They last beat the Redskins on the road in 1935, when the team resided in Boston.

==== Week 4: vs. Chicago Bears ====
Week 4: Chicago Bears at Detroit Lions – Game summary

Quarter	1	2	3	4	Total
Bears	3	10	3	16	**32**
**Lions**	3	27	7	3	**40**

at Ford Field, Detroit, Michigan

- Date: September 29
- Game time: 1:00 pm. EDT
- Game weather: None (indoor stadium)
- Game attendance: 64,552
- Referee: Mike Carey
- TV announcers (Fox): Thom Brennaman, Brian Billick and Laura Okmin
- Recap, Game book

Game information

**First quarter**

- CHI – Robbie Gould 34-yard field goal, 8:34. Bears 3–0.
- DET – David Akers 23-yard field goal, 2:38. Tied 3–3.

**Second quarter**

- DET – David Akers 31-yard field goal, 14:28. Lions 6–3.
- CHI – Matt Forté 53-yard run (Robbie Gould kick), 13:44. Bears 10–6.
- DET – David Akers 41-yard field goal, 10:19. Bears 10–9.
- DET – Matthew Stafford 1-yard run (David Akers kick), 6:09. Lions 16–10.
- DET – Calvin Johnson 2-yard pass from Matthew Stafford (David Akers kick), 5:47. Lions 23–10.
- DET – Reggie Bush 37-yard run (David Akers kick), 2:43. Lions 30–10.
- CHI – Robbie Gould 28-yard field goal, 0:00. Lions 30–13.

**Third quarter**

- CHI – Robbie Gould 25-yard field goal, 9:05. Lions 30–16.
- DET – Nick Fairley 4-yard fumble return (David Akers kick), 0:20. Lions 37–16.

**Fourth quarter**

- DET – David Akers 43-yard field goal, 8:57. Lions 40–16.
- CHI – Alshon Jeffery 14-yard pass from Jay Cutler (Jay Cutler–Alshon Jeffery pass), 4:00. Lions 40–24.
- CHI – Earl Bennett 10-yard pass from Jay Cutler (Jay Cutler–Brandon Marshall pass), 0:43. Lions 40–32.

**Top passers**

- CHI – Jay Cutler – 27/47, 317 yards, 2 TD, 3 INT
- DET – Matthew Stafford – 23/35, 242 yards, TD, INT

**Top rushers**

- CHI – Matt Forte – 14 rushes, 95 yards, TD
- DET – Reggie Bush – 18 rushes, 139 yards, TD

**Top receivers**

- CHI – Alshon Jeffery – 5 receptions, 107 yards, TD
- DET – Kris Durham – 3 receptions, 58 yards

The 2–1 Lions returned home in Week 4 to face the 3–0 Chicago Bears. Robbie Gould started the scoring for the Bears with a 34-yard field goal, but field goals of 23 and 31 yards by David Akers put the Lions up 6–3. Early in the second quarter, Matt Forte exploded for a 53-yard touchdown run to put Chicago back up, 10–6. The lead was narrowed to 10–9 when Akers connected on a 41-yard field goal. The Lions then reeled off three straight touchdowns in the span of three and a half minutes. Set up by a 57-yard punt return from Micheal Spurlock, Matthew Stafford scored first when he recovered his own fumble in the end zone following a 1-yard quarterback sneak. On Chicago's next possession, Jay Cutler's second interception of the day was returned by Glover Quin 42 yards, to the Bears 2. One play later, Stafford hit Calvin Johnson in the corner of the end zone for a 2-yard TD. On the Lions next possession, Reggie Bush scored on a 37-yard TD run, hurdling Bears safety Major Wright on his way to the end zone. Robbie Gould closed the half with a 28-yard field goal that made the score 30–13. Gould connected again on a 25-yarder in the third quarter to get the Bears within two touchdowns. On Chicago's next possession, Ndamukong Suh forced a Jay Cutler fumble, then Nick Fairley scooped up the ball and took it the remaining 4 yards for the score to give Detroit a 37–16 lead. David Akers extended it to 40–16 on a 43-yard field goal in the fourth quarter. The Bears attempted a furious rally in the final minutes. Cutler hit Alshon Jeffery on a 14-yard TD pass with four minutes left, then connected with Jeffery again for a 2-point conversion to make the score 40–24. On a potential clock-killing drive, Lions running back Joique Bell lost a fumble, and the Bears took advantage with another Cutler TD pass – this one going 10 yards to Earl Bennett. After another successful two-point conversion, Chicago was within one score, 40–32, but Detroit's Kris Durham recovered the ensuing onside kick to preserve the victory.

After throwing just one interception in eight previous games against the Lions, Jay Cutler threw three picks in this game, two of them being grabbed by Lions safety Louis Delmas. Reggie Bush rushed 18 times for 139 yards, and had another 34 yards on four receptions.

==== Week 5: at Green Bay Packers ====
Week 5: Detroit Lions at Green Bay Packers – Game summary

Quarter	1	2	3	4	Total
Lions	0	3	0	6	**9**
**Packers**	3	3	10	6	**22**

at Lambeau Field, Green Bay, Wisconsin

- Date: October 6
- Game time: 1:00 pm. EDT/12:00 p.m. CDT
- Game weather: Sunny, 59 °F (15 °C)
- Game attendance: 78,200
- Referee: Jerome Boger
- TV announcers (Fox): Kenny Albert, Daryl Johnston and Tony Siragusa
- Recap, Game book

Game information

**First quarter**

- GB – Mason Crosby 26-yard field goal, 7:50. Packers 3–0.

**Second quarter**

- GB – Mason Crosby 52-yard field goal, 3:55. Packers 6–0.
- DET – David Akers 53-yard field goal, 3:32. Packers 6–3.

**Third quarter**

- GB – Mason Crosby 31-yard field goal, 2:20. Packers 9–3.
- GB – James Jones 83-yard pass from Aaron Rodgers (Mason Crosby kick), 0:54. Packers 16–3.

**Fourth quarter**

- GB – Mason Crosby 42-yard field goal, 4:35. Packers 19–3.
- GB – Mason Crosby 45-yard field goal, 3:11. Packers 22–3.
- DET – Kris Durham 13-yard pass from Matthew Stafford (pass failed), 1:44. Packers 22–9.

**Top passers**

- DET – Matthew Stafford – 19/33, 184 yards, TD
- GB – Aaron Rodgers – 20/29, 274 yards, TD

**Top rushers**

- DET – Reggie Bush – 13 rushes, 44 yards
- GB – Eddie Lacy – 20 rushes, 88 yards

**Top receivers**

- DET – Brandon Pettigrew – 4 receptions, 59 yards
- GB – James Jones – 4 receptions, 127 yards, TD

The Lions were attempting to end a 21-game regular season losing streak at Green Bay's Lambeau Field, but were hampered by injuries to starting wide receivers Nate Burleson and Calvin Johnson, neither of whom could suit up for the game. Neither offense could get much going in the first half. Mason Crosby converted field goals of 26 and 52 yards for the Packers, while David Akers hit a 53-yarder for the Lions, making the halftime score 6–3 in favor of Green Bay. Crosby connected again in the third quarter on a 31-yard field goal. The big blow of the game came just 1:26 later, when Aaron Rodgers found James Jones deep, resulting in an 83-yard touchdown and a 16–3 Green Bay lead. Two more Crosby field goals of 42 and 45 yards put the game out of reach. Matthew Stafford hit Kris Durham with a 13-yard TD pass late in the final quarter to make the score 22–9 (following a failed two-point conversion), but it was too little, too late.

==== Week 6: at Cleveland Browns ====
Week 6: Detroit Lions at Cleveland Browns – Game summary

Quarter	1	2	3	4	Total
**Lions**	7	0	7	17	**31**
Browns	0	17	0	0	**17**

at FirstEnergy Stadium, Cleveland, Ohio

- Date: October 13
- Game time: 1:00 pm. EDT
- Game weather: Cloudy, 66 °F (19 °C)
- Game attendance: 71,513
- Referee: Walt Coleman
- TV announcers (Fox): Tom McCarthy, Heath Evans and Lisa Byington
- Recap, Game book

Game information

**First quarter**

- DET – Joseph Fauria 1-yard pass from Matthew Stafford (David Akers kick), 3:27. Lions 7–0.

**Second quarter**

- CLE – Chris Ogbonnaya 4-yard pass from Brandon Weeden (Billy Cundiff kick), 12:52. Tied 7–7.
- CLE – Greg Little 2-yard pass from Brandon Weeden (Billy Cundiff kick), 1:16. Browns 14–7.
- CLE – Billy Cundiff 40-yard field goal, 0:08. Browns 17–7.

**Third quarter**

- DET – Reggie Bush 18-yard pass from Matthew Stafford (David Akers kick), 8:57. Browns 17–14.

**Fourth quarter**

- DET – Joseph Fauria 23-yard pass from Matthew Stafford (David Akers kick), 10:35. Lions 21–17.
- DET – David Akers 51-yard field goal, 6:04. Lions 24–17.
- DET – Joseph Fauria 10-yard pass from Matthew Stafford (David Akers kick), 2:01. Lions 31–17.

**Top passers**

- DET – Matthew Stafford – 25/43, 248 yards, 4 TD, INT
- CLE – Brandon Weeden – 26/43, 292 yards, 2 TD, 2 INT

**Top rushers**

- DET – Reggie Bush – 17 rushes, 78 yards
- CLE – Travis Benjamin – 1 rush, 45 yards

**Top receivers**

- DET – Kris Durham – 8 receptions, 83 yards
- CLE – Josh Gordon – 7 receptions, 126 yards

The Lions struck first on a 1-yard TD pass from Matthew Stafford to tight end Joseph Fauria for the only score of the first quarter. Cleveland did all the scoring in the second quarter. First, Brandon Weeden hit running back Chris Ogbonnaya with a screen pass for a 4-yard touchdown, knotting the score at 7–7. Weeden then cashed in again with 1:16 left in the half, connecting with Greg Little for a 2-yard TD pass. After a Lions three-and-out, the Browns got the ball with enough time to get Billy Cundiff into field goal range, and he converted a 40-yard attempt to make the halftime score 17–7. The second half belonged entirely to the Lions. In the third quarter, Stafford hit Reggie Bush on a short pass, and the running back took it 18 yards for a touchdown, bringing Detroit closer at 17–14. The Lions retook the lead, 21–17, early in the fourth quarter when Stafford again connected with Joseph Fauria, this time on a 23-yard play. David Akers extended the lead to 24–17 when he made good on a 51-yard field goal. After a key interception of Weeden by DeAndre Levy, the Lions put the game away when Stafford and Fauria connected a third time with a 10-yard TD pass play, providing a final score of 31–17.

Matthew Stafford was 25-of-43 and had his first four-TD performance of the season. Joseph Fauria now has only seven catches on the season, but five have gone for touchdowns. Cleveland's Josh Gordon tallied 126 yards receiving in defeat.

==== Week 7: vs. Cincinnati Bengals ====
Week 7: Cincinnati Bengals at Detroit Lions – Game summary

Quarter	1	2	3	4	Total
**Bengals**	7	7	10	3	**27**
Lions	7	3	7	7	**24**

at Ford Field, Detroit, Michigan

- Date: October 20
- Game time: 1:00 pm. EDT
- Game weather: None (indoor stadium)
- Game attendance: 63,207
- Referee: Scott Green
- TV announcers (CBS): Marv Albert and Rich Gannon
- Recap, Game book

Game information

**First quarter**

- CIN – A. J. Green 82-yard pass from Andy Dalton (Mike Nugent kick), 10:59. Bengals 7–0.
- DET – Brandon Pettigrew 3-yard pass from Matthew Stafford (David Akers kick), 3:02. Tied 7–7.

**Second quarter**

- DET – David Akers 36-yard field goal, 11:43. Lions 10–7.
- CIN – Marvin Jones 12-yard pass from Andy Dalton (Mike Nugent kick), 0:41. Bengals 14–10.

**Third quarter**

- CIN – Tyler Eifert 32-yard pass from Andy Dalton (Mike Nugent kick), 10:42. Bengals 21–10.
- DET – Calvin Johnson 27-yard pass from Matthew Stafford (David Akers kick), 8:17. Bengals 21–17.
- CIN – Mike Nugent 48-yard field goal, 3:37. Bengals 24–17.

**Fourth quarter**

- DET – Calvin Johnson 50-yard pass from Matthew Stafford (David Akers kick), 11:59. Tied 24–24.
- CIN – Mike Nugent 54-yard field goal, 0:00. Bengals 27–24.

**Top passers**

- CIN – Andy Dalton – 24/34, 372 yards, 3 TD
- DET – Matthew Stafford – 28/51, 357 yards, 3 TD

**Top rushers**

- CIN – Giovani Bernard – 7 rushes, 27 yards
- DET – Reggie Bush – 20 rushes, 50 yards

**Top receivers**

- CIN – A. J. Green – 6 receptions, 155 yards, TD
- DET – Calvin Johnson – 9 receptions, 155 yards, 2 TD

Cincinnati scored on its first possession, when Andy Dalton threw to A. J. Green for an 82-yard touchdown. The Lions tied it later in the first quarter on a 3-yard TD pass from Matthew Stafford to Brandon Pettigrew. A 36-yard field goal by David Akers gave the Lions a 10–7-second quarter lead. But late in the quarter, Akers had a 34-yard field goal attempt blocked by Carlos Dunlap, which the Bengals returned all the way to the Lions 40-yard line despite fumbling during the return. That set up a 12-yard TD strike from Andy Dalton to Marvin Jones just before the first half closed, giving Cincinnati a 14–10 lead. The teams exchanged TD passes in the third quarter. First, Dalton hit Tyler Eifert for a 32-yard TD, and Stafford followed shortly after with a 27-yard TD toss to Calvin Johnson. Mike Nugent connected on a 48-yard field goal late in the third to put the Bengals up 24–17. The Lions tied the game at 24 in the fourth quarter, when Calvin Johnson leaped up and beat three Bengals defenders in the end zone on a 50-yard pass from Matthew Stafford. After the game, Stafford called Johnson's play "one of the best catches I have ever seen." Late in the fourth quarter, a punt by the Bengals Kevin Huber pinned the Lions at their own 6-yard line. Detroit attempted to kill enough clock to get the game to overtime, but could only gain one first down and 17 yards. Detroit punter Sam Martin then shanked a punt that netted only 28 yards before going out of bounds at the Cincinnati 49 with 26 seconds left in the game. Three plays and 15 yards later, Mike Nugent boomed a 54-yard field goal as time expired to give the Bengals a 27–24 victory.

The aerial attack for both teams produced big numbers. Andy Dalton was 24-of-34 for 372 yards and 3 touchdowns, while Matthew Stafford was 28-of-51 for 357 yards and 3 scores. A. J. Green of the Bengals and Calvin Johnson of the Lions both tallied 155 yards receiving on the day.

==== Week 8: vs. Dallas Cowboys ====
Week 8: Dallas Cowboys at Detroit Lions – Game summary

Quarter	1	2	3	4	Total
Cowboys	0	10	3	17	**30**
**Lions**	7	0	0	24	**31**

at Ford Field, Detroit, Michigan

- Date: October 27
- Game time: 1:00 pm. EDT
- Game weather: None (indoor stadium)
- Game attendance: 64,379
- Referee: Bill Vinovich
- TV announcers (Fox): Dick Stockton, Brian Billick and Laura Okmin
- Recap, Game book

Game information

**First quarter**

- DET – Calvin Johnson 2-yard pass from Matthew Stafford (David Akers kick), 0:54. Lions 7–0.

**Second quarter**

- DAL – Dan Bailey 53-yard field goal, 5:39. Lions 7–3.
- DAL – Dez Bryant 5-yard pass from Tony Romo (Dan Bailey kick), 0:46. Cowboys 10–7.

**Third quarter**

- DAL – Dan Bailey 53-yard field goal, 3:02. Cowboys 13–7.

**Fourth quarter**

- DET – David Akers 20-yard field goal, 13:13. Cowboys 13–10.
- DAL – Terrance Williams 60-yard pass from Tony Romo (Dan Bailey kick), 11:32. Cowboys 20–10.
- DET – Joique Bell 1-yard run (David Akers kick), 7:38. Cowboys 20–17.
- DAL – Dez Bryant 50-yard pass from Tony Romo (Dan Bailey kick), 6:45. Cowboys 27–17.
- DET – Reggie Bush 1-yard run (David Akers kick), 3:33. Cowboys 27–24.
- DAL – Dan Bailey 44-yard field goal, 1:02. Cowboys 30–24.
- DET – Matthew Stafford 1-yard run (David Akers kick), 0:12. Lions 31–30.

**Top passers**

- DAL – Tony Romo – 14/30, 206 yards, 3 TD
- DET – Matthew Stafford – 33/48, 488 yards, TD, 2 INT

**Top rushers**

- DAL – Joseph Randle – 14 rushes, 26 yards
- DET – Reggie Bush – 21 rushes, 92 yards, TD

**Top receivers**

- DAL – Dez Bryant – 3 receptions, 72 yards, 2 TD
- DET – Calvin Johnson – 14 receptions, 329 yards, TD

The Lions needed all 60 minutes to overcome four turnovers and a minus-6 differential in penalties to overtake the Dallas Cowboys. The game started slowly, with just three scores in the first half. Detroit struck first with a 90-yard drive, highlighted by an 87-yard pass from Matthew Stafford to Calvin Johnson and capped when the two connected again on a fourth-down 2-yard TD pass. Dallas got a second quarter field goal of 53 yards by Dan Bailey to make the score 7–3. On the Lions next possession, Sean Lee intercepted Stafford for the second time in the game and returned the ball 74 yards to the Lions 4-yard line. Two plays later, Tony Romo hit Dez Bryant with a 5-yard TD pass, giving Dallas a 10–7 halftime lead. Bailey converted on another 53-yard field goal in the third quarter, putting the Cowboys up 13–7. David Akers narrowed the lead to 13–10 with a 20-yard field goal early in the fourth quarter. But Dallas struck on their next possession when Tony Romo connected with Terrance Williams on a 60-yard TD pass play, putting them up by 10. Detroit's Joique Bell capped an 80-yard drive with a 1-yard TD run to cut the lead to 3 again, at 20–17. Dallas again went up 10, as Romo and Bryant hooked up for their second TD pass play of the day, this one going 50 yards. The Lions came back with a 1-yard TD run by Reggie Bush, on a drive that featured a key 54-yard pass from Stafford to Calvin Johnson, cutting the lead to 27–24. The Lions lost the ball on downs with 1:24 left in the game, but Dallas could only take 22 seconds off the clock before Dan Bailey put them up 30–24 with a 44-yard field goal. The Lions began an improbable 80-yard TD drive with just 1:02 remaining on the clock and no time-outs left. Stafford hit Kris Durham with a key 40-yard pass that put the ball at the Cowboys' 23. Stafford then hit Calvin Johnson with a 22-yard pass on the next play that got the ball to the Dallas 1, but the clock was still running. Instead of spiking the ball to stop the clock after the Lions quickly lined up, Matthew Stafford lunged over a pile of linemen and stretched the ball over the goal line for the tying touchdown, with David Akers' extra point giving the Lions a 31–30 victory.

The Lions tallied 623 yards of total offense on the afternoon. Stafford was 33-of-48 for 488 yards and one touchdown. Most of his passing yards were to Calvin Johnson, as the Lions wideout caught 14 balls for 329 yards and one touchdown. Johnson set an NFL record for receiving yards in a regulation game, and was just 7 yards short of the full game record of 336 yards set by Flipper Anderson in a 1989 overtime game. Calvin also tied Lance Alworth's all-time NFL mark with his fifth career game of 200 or more receiving yards. The Lions also became just the second team in the last 56 such games to win despite a minus-4 turnover differential. The only other team to accomplish this was the New England Patriots in a 2007 game against the Miami Dolphins.

==== Week 10: at Chicago Bears ====
Week 10: Detroit Lions at Chicago Bears – Game summary

Quarter	1	2	3	4	Total
**Lions**	7	0	7	7	**21**
Bears	7	0	3	9	**19**

at Soldier Field, Chicago, Illinois

- Date: November 10
- Game time: 1:00 pm. EST/12:00 pm. CST
- Game weather: Mostly sunny, 47 °F (8 °C)
- Game attendance: 62,431
- Referee: Bill Leavy
- TV announcers (Fox): Kenny Albert, Daryl Johnston and Tony Siragusa
- Recap, Game book

Game information

**First quarter**

- CHI – Brandon Marshall 32-yard pass from Jay Cutler (Robbie Gould kick), 12:37. Bears 7–0.
- DET – Kris Durham 5-yard pass from Matthew Stafford (David Akers kick), 5:57. Tied 7–7.

**Second quarter**

- No scoring plays.

**Third quarter**

- DET – Calvin Johnson 4-yard pass from Mathew Stafford (David Akers kick), 12:58. Lions 14–7.
- CHI – Robbie Gould 25-yard field goal, 7:25. Lions 14–10.

**Fourth quarter**

- CHI – Robbie Gould 32-yard field goal, 9:17. Lions 14–13.
- DET – Calvin Johnson 14-yard pass from Matthew Stafford (David Akers kick), 2:22. Lions 21–13.
- CHI – Brandon Marshall 11-yard pass from Josh McCown (run failed), 0:40. Lions 21–19.

**Top passers**

- DET – Matthew Stafford – 18/35, 219 yards, 3 TD
- CHI – Jay Cutler – 21/40, 250 yards, 2 TD

**Top rushers**

- DET – Reggie Bush – 14 rushes, 105 yards
- CHI – Matt Forté – 17 rushes, 33 yards

**Top receivers**

- DET – Calvin Johnson – 6 receptions, 83 yards, 2 TD
- CHI – Brandon Marshall – 7 receptions, 139 yards, 2 TD

The Lions entered the game looking to sweep a season series from the Bears for the first time since 2007, and did so. Chicago scored on the game's opening possession when Jay Cutler capped a 65-yard drive with a 32-yard TD pass to Brandon Marshall. The Lions tied the game at 7 later in the first quarter when Matthew Stafford found Kris Durham in the back of the end zone with a 5-yard TD pass. On the opening drive of the third quarter, Stafford hit Calvin Johnson with a 4-yard TD pass to put the Lions up 14–7. The Bears narrowed the lead to one point with Robbie Gould field goals of 25 and 32 yards. With 2:22 left in the game, Stafford and Johnson connected again, this time on a 14-yard TD pass play, putting the Lions up 21–13. Josh McCown, who relieved an injured Cutler, led the Bears on a 74-yard TD drive, capped by an 11-yard pass to Brandon Marshall for the score. Needing a two-point conversion to tie the game, McCown's pass to Dante Rosario sailed out of the end zone, but Detroit's Willie Young was called for roughing the passer, giving the Bears another chance from the 1-yard line. The Bears attempted a rushing play for the conversion, but Nick Fairley tackled Matt Forté behind the line of scrimmage, ending the Bears hopes.

Calvin Johnson's second touchdown reception of the game gave him 63 touchdown catches in his Lions career, surpassing Herman Moore's previous team record of 62. The win secured the Lions the #1 spot in the NFC North division, the first time they have held that spot alone since Week 5 of the 2005 season.

==== Week 11: at Pittsburgh Steelers ====
Week 11: Detroit Lions at Pittsburgh Steelers – Game summary

Quarter	1	2	3	4	Total
Lions	0	27	0	0	**27**
**Steelers**	14	6	3	14	**37**

at Heinz Field, Pittsburgh, Pennsylvania

- Date: November 17
- Game time: 1:00 pm. EST
- Game weather: Thunderstorms, 60 °F (16 °C)
- Game attendance: 57,905
- Referee: Walt Anderson
- TV announcers (Fox): Thom Brennaman, Brian Billick and Laura Okmin
- Recap, Game book

Game information

**First quarter**

- PIT – Antonio Brown 34-yard pass from Ben Roethlisberger (Shaun Suisham kick), 6:20. Steelers 7–0.
- PIT – Antonio Brown 47-yard pass from Ben Roethlisberger (Shaun Suisham kick), 3:58. Steelers 14–0.

**Second quarter**

- DET – David Akers 35-yard field goal, 14:05. Steelers 14–3.
- PIT – Shaun Suisham 25-yard field goal, 10:31. Steelers 17–3.
- DET – Calvin Johnson 79-yard pass from Matthew Stafford (David Akers kick), 10:13. Steelers 17–10.
- PIT – Shaun Suisham 34-yard field goal, 7:19. Steelers 20–10.
- DET – Calvin Johnson 19-yard pass from Matthew Stafford (David Akers kick), 3:52. Steelers 20–17.
- DET – Joique Bell 2-yard run (David Akers kick), 1:52. Lions 24–20.
- DET – David Akers 19-yard field goal, 0:04. Lions 27–20.

**Third quarter**

- PIT – Shaun Suisham 21-yard field goal, 5:14. Lions 27–23.

**Fourth quarter**

- PIT – Will Johnson 1-yard pass from Ben Roethlisberger (Shaun Suisham kick), 4:46. Steelers 30–27.
- PIT – Jerricho Cotchery 20-yard pass from Ben Roethlisberger (Shaun Suisham kick), 2:29. Steelers 37–27.

**Top passers**

- DET – Matthew Stafford – 19/46, 362 yards, 2 TD, INT
- PIT – Ben Roethlisberger – 29/45, 367 yards, 4 TD

**Top rushers**

- DET – Joique Bell – 9 rushes, 49 yards, TD
- PIT – Le'Veon Bell – 18 rushes, 36 yards

**Top receivers**

- DET – Calvin Johnson – 6 receptions, 179 yards, 2 TD
- PIT – Antonio Brown – 7 receptions, 147 yards, 2 TD

Week 11 saw the Lions trying to win their first game in Pittsburgh since 1955. The Steelers jumped out to an early 14–0 lead, when Ben Roethlisberger hit Antonio Brown with TD passes of 34 and 47 yards on consecutive drives. Detroit got on the board in the second quarter with a 35-yard David Akers field goal, but Pittsburgh went up by 14 again when Shaun Suisham connected on a 25-yard field goal. The Lions made the score 17–10 on the first play of their next possession, when Matthew Stafford found Calvin Johnson for a 79-yard TD pass play. After a 34-yard Suisham field goal, the Lions drew within 3 points when Stafford and Johnson connected again, this time for a 19-yard TD. The Lions took their first lead, 24–20, on a Joique Bell 2-yard run late in the quarter. Detroit had a chance to go up by 11 in the closing seconds of the first half, but after three incomplete passes from the Steelers' 1-yard line, they settled for a 19-yard Akers field goal to make the score 27–20. As the weather turned bad and the field got sloppy in the second half, so did the Lions offense. A 21-yard Suisham field goal was the only score of the third quarter, drawing the Steelers within 4 points at 27–23. The Lions got inside the Pittsburgh 10-yard line on their next possession, but failed to score on three straight plays before calling in the field goal unit. The Lions attempted a fake that failed, and following a Sam Martin fumble, the Steelers took over on their own 3-yard line. Roethlisberger engineered a game-winning 97-yard drive, culminating in a 1-yard TD pass to Will Johnson. The Steelers iced it on their next possession, going up 37–27 after Roethlisberger hit Jerricho Cotchery with a 20-yard TD pass.

Matthew Stafford was 19-of-46 passing in the game for 362 yards, including just 3-for-16 in the second half, with many of his passes being dropped by Lions receivers. Ben Roethlisberger, meanwhile, went 29-of-45 for 367 yards and four touchdowns. Calvin Johnson led all players with 179 receiving yards and two touchdowns, but he was shut out in the second half. Despite the loss, Stafford (16,005 yards) passed Bobby Layne's Lion record of 15,710 career passing yards, while Johnson tied Herman Moore's team mark of four consecutive 1,000-yard receiving seasons.

==== Week 12: vs. Tampa Bay Buccaneers ====
Week 12: Tampa Bay Buccaneers at Detroit Lions – Game summary

Quarter	1	2	3	4	Total
**Buccaneers**	3	14	0	7	**24**
Lions	0	14	7	0	**21**

at Ford Field, Detroit, Michigan

- Date: November 24
- Game time: 1:00 pm. EST
- Game weather: None (indoor stadium)
- Game attendance: 62,098
- Referee: Clete Blakeman
- TV announcers (Fox): Thom Brennaman, Brian Billick and Laura Okmin
- Recap, Game book

Game information

**First quarter**

- TB – Rian Lindell 38-yard field goal, 3:27. Buccaneers 3–0. **Drive: 13 plays, 58 yards, 7:51.**

**Second quarter**

- DET – Nate Burleson 5-yard pass from Matthew Stafford (David Akers kick), 11:54. Lions 7–3. **Drive: 11 plays, 80 yards, 6:33.**
- TB – Tiquan Underwood 7-yard pass from Mike Glennon (Rian Lindell kick), 8:50. Buccaneers 10–7. **Drive: 6 plays, 80 yards, 3:08.**
- DET – Joseph Fauria 10-yard pass from Matthew Stafford (David Akers kick), 4:38. Lions 14–10. **Drive: 7 plays, 80 yards, 4:09.**
- TB – Leonard Johnson 48-yard interception return (Rian Lindell kick), 1:01. Buccaneers 17–14.

**Third quarter**

- DET – Brandon Pettigrew 18-yard pass from Matthew Stafford (David Akers kick), 9:41. Lions 21–17. **Drive: 8 plays, 69 yards, 3:53.**

**Fourth quarter**

- TB – Tiquan Underwood 85-yard pass from Mike Glennon (Rian Lindell kick), 14:17. Buccaneers 24–21. **Drive: 4 plays, 95 yards, 1:42.**

**Top passers**

- TB – Mike Glennon – 14/21, 247 yards, 2 TD
- DET – Matthew Stafford – 26/46, 297 yards, 3 TD, 4 INT

**Top rushers**

- TB – Bobby Rainey – 18 rushes, 35 yards
- DET – Reggie Bush – 15 rushes, 83 yards

**Top receivers**

- TB – Tiquan Underwood – 3 receptions, 108 yards, 2 TD
- DET – Calvin Johnson – 7 receptions, 115 yards

The Lions returned home to face the 2–8 Tampa Bay Buccaneers. The Bucs got on the board first with a 38-yard Rian Lindell field goal for the only scoring of the first quarter. Detroit responded early in the second with a 5-yard TD pass from Matthew Stafford to Nate Burleson, who was playing in his first game since Week 3. Tiquan Underwood put Tampa Bay back on top, 10–7 when he hauled in a 7-yard TD pass from Mike Glennon. The Lions came back with a 10-yard Matthew Stafford-to-Joseph Fauria TD connection. Late in the half, Leonard Johnson picked off a Stafford pass intended for Brandon Pettigrew and returned it 48 yards for a touchdown, sending the Bucs to the locker room with a 17–14 lead. The Lions jumped ahead for the third time in the game, 21–17, when Stafford hit Pettigrew for an 18-yard TD pass. Tampa Bay completed the scoring when Mike Glennon again connected with Tiquan Underwood, this time on an 85-yard bomb, making the final score 24–21. The Lions had two potential game-tying or game-winning drives end on turnovers. Kris Durham fumbled after making a reception in Bucs territory, and with 47 seconds left in the game, Calvin Johnson had a potential catch at the Bucs 5-yard line stripped from his hands, resulting in a game-clinching interception by Johnthan Banks.

The Lions had a season-high five turnovers in the game, while the Buccaneers won their third straight game after an 0–8 start to the season.

==== Week 13: vs. Green Bay Packers ====
Thanksgiving Day game

Week 13: Green Bay Packers at Detroit Lions – Game summary

Quarter	1	2	3	4	Total
Packers	0	10	0	0	**10**
**Lions**	0	17	9	14	**40**

at Ford Field, Detroit, Michigan

- Date: November 28
- Game time: 12:30 pm. EST
- Game weather: None (indoor stadium)
- Game attendance: 64,934
- Referee: Gene Steratore
- TV announcers (Fox): Joe Buck, Troy Aikman, Pam Oliver and Erin Andrews
- Recap, Game book

Game information

**First quarter**

- No scoring plays.

**Second quarter**

- DET – David Akers 27-yard field goal, 14:51. Lions 3–0.
- GB – Mason Crosby 54-yard field goal, 12:41. Tied 3–3.
- GB – Morgan Burnett 1-yard fumble return (Mason Crosby kick), 12:33. Packers 10–3.
- DET – Jeremy Ross 5-yard pass from Matthew Stafford (David Akers kick), 4:33. Tied 10–10.
- DET – Reggie Bush 1-yard run (David Akers kick), 1:22. Lions 17–10.

**Third quarter**

- DET – Calvin Johnson 20-yard pass from Matthew Stafford (David Akers kick), 9:08. Lions 24–10.
- DET – Matt Flynn sacked in the end zone by Ndamukong Suh for a safety, 0:58. Lions 26–10.

**Fourth quarter**

- DET – Joique Bell 1-yard run (David Akers kick), 13:06. Lions 33–10.
- DET – Kevin Ogletree 20-yard pass from Matthew Stafford (David Akers kick), 4:17. Lions 40–10.

**Top passers**

- GB – Matt Flynn – 10/20, 139 yards, INT
- DET – Matthew Stafford – 22/35, 330 yards, 3 TD, 2 INT

**Top rushers**

- GB – Eddie Lacy – 10 rushes, 16 yards
- DET – Reggie Bush – 20 rushes, 117 yards, TD

**Top receivers**

- GB – James Jones – 3 receptions, 79 yards
- DET – Calvin Johnson – 6 receptions, 101 yards, TD

Despite three turnovers and a missed field goal in the first half, the Lions rebounded to dominate the Packers, earning their first win on Thanksgiving Day since 2003. After David Akers and Mason Crosby exchanged field goals, Green Bay took their first and only lead of the day in the second quarter when Nick Perry forced a Matthew Stafford fumble that Morgan Burnett returned for a 1-yard touchdown. Detroit tied the score at 10 after Stafford found Jeremy Ross in the end zone with a 5-yard TD pass. A 1-yard Reggie Bush TD run gave the Lions a 17–10 halftime lead. The second half was all Lions. Calvin Johnson hauled in a 20-yard pass from Stafford for a 24–10 Lions lead. Late in the third quarter, Ndamukong Suh sacked Matt Flynn in the end zone for a safety. After the ensuing free kick, Joique Bell finished off a 56-yard drive with a 1-yard TD run to put Detroit up 33–10. Kevin Ogletree completed the scoring by catching a 20-yard TD pass from Stafford to account for a 40–10 final score.

Matthew Stafford was 22-of-35 passing, hitting nine different receivers for 330 yards and three touchdowns, while Reggie Bush had 182 yards from scrimmage (117 rushing, 65 receiving). With 101 yards receiving in the game, Calvin Johnson now has 4,944 receiving yards over the 2011 to 2013 seasons, surpassing Jerry Rice's previous NFL record for receiving yards over a three-season stretch (4,850 yards from 1993 to 1995). The Lions offense outgained the Packers in the game 561 yards to 126 yards, while Detroit's defense sacked Matt Flynn seven times.

==== Week 14: at Philadelphia Eagles ====
Week 14: Detroit Lions at Philadelphia Eagles – Game summary

Quarter	1	2	3	4	Total
Lions	0	8	6	6	**20**
**Eagles**	0	0	6	28	**34**

at Lincoln Financial Field, Philadelphia, Pennsylvania

- Date: December 8
- Game time: 1:00 pm. EST
- Game weather: Snow, 27 °F (−3 °C)
- Game attendance: 69,144
- Referee: Ed Hochuli
- TV announcers (Fox): Kevin Burkhardt, John Lynch and Molly McGrath
- Recap, Game book

This game was well known for being played in a blinding blizzard, with at least 4 inches falling throughout the game. The Lions were leading after the first three quarters, but the Eagles scored four touchdowns to outscore Detroit 28–6 in the fourth quarter, ultimately winning 34–20. The loss dropped Detroit to 7–6, giving them only one win out of their last four games.

==== Week 15: vs. Baltimore Ravens ====
Week 15: Baltimore Ravens at Detroit Lions – Game summary

Quarter	1	2	3	4	Total
**Ravens**	0	9	3	6	**18**
Lions	7	0	3	6	**16**

at Ford Field, Detroit, Michigan

- Date: December 16
- Game time: 8:40 pm. EST
- Game weather: None (indoor stadium)
- Game attendance: 64,742
- Referee: Carl Cheffers
- TV announcers (ESPN): Mike Tirico, Jon Gruden and Lisa Salters
- Recap, Game book

The Lions hoped to keep their slim lead for the NFC North division title. Playing against the Ravens, Detroit rallied in the first quarter before Baltimore's Justin Tucker kicked three field goals to give his team a halftime lead, 9–7. After trailing 12–10 in the third quarter, the Lions took a 16–12 lead with another touchdown and a failed two-point conversion. Turnovers again doomed the Lions. Matthew Stafford threw an interception, the third Lions turnover, late in the game, with Detroit clinging to a 16–15 lead. That gave Justin Tucker a chance at a 61-yard field goal, which he converted to give Baltimore an 18–16 victory. With the shocking loss, the Lions fell to 7–7 and third place within their division.

==== Week 16: vs. New York Giants ====
Week 16: New York Giants at Detroit Lions – Game summary

Quarter	1	2	3	4	OT	Total
**Giants**	3	10	0	7	3	**23**
Lions	0	3	9	8	0	**20**

at Ford Field, Detroit, Michigan

- Date: December 22
- Game time: 4:05 pm. EST
- Game weather: None (indoor stadium)
- Game attendance: 63,996
- Referee: Jerome Boger
- TV announcers (Fox): Kenny Albert, Daryl Johnston and Tony Siragusa
- Recap, Game book

In their home finale, the Lions met the Giants in a game that the Lions needed to win to stay in the division race. The Lions were having trouble scoring and could only muster a field goal before halftime while the Giants built 13 points to maintain their lead. The Lions managed to return by scoring 17 unanswered points in the third and fourth quarters. However, an interception thrown by Stafford led to the Giants tying the game. As the clock ran out with the score tied, Head Coach Jim Schwartz decided to let the game go into overtime despite Detroit possessing two timeouts. This led to many fans booing at the decision, and Schwartz appeared to yell angrily at the booing crowd. After both teams went 3 and out with the Giants having the starting possession, the Giants managed to record a 45-yard field goal to win the game and seal the Lions' fate.

==== Week 17: at Minnesota Vikings ====
Week 17: Detroit Lions at Minnesota Vikings – Game summary

Quarter	1	2	3	4	Total
Lions	0	0	7	6	**13**
**Vikings**	7	0	0	7	**14**

at Hubert H. Humphrey Metrodome, Minneapolis, Minnesota

- Date: December 29
- Game time: 1:00 pm. EST/12:00 pm. CST
- Game weather: None (indoor stadium)
- Game attendance: 64,134
- Referee: Tony Corrente
- TV announcers (Fox): Gus Johnson, Charles Davis and Kristina Pink
- Recap, Gamebook

To end the season, the Lions had a rematch against division rival Minnesota Vikings in the last ever game at the Hubert H. Humphrey Metrodome in Minneapolis. With both teams resting injured superstars (Adrian Peterson for Minnesota and Calvin Johnson for Detroit), the Vikings won the low-scoring contest, 14–13.

=== Standings ===
==== Division ====
NFC North
	W	L	T	PCT	DIV	CONF	PF	PA	STK
^{(4)} Green Bay Packers	8	7	1	.531	3–2–1	6–5–1	417	428	W1
Chicago Bears	8	8	0	.500	2–4	4–8	445	478	L2
Detroit Lions	7	9	0	.438	4–2	6–6	395	376	L4
Minnesota Vikings	5	10	1	.344	2–3–1	4–7–1	391	480	W1

==== Conference ====
NFC
#	Team	Division	W	L	T	PCT	DIV	CONF	SOS	SOV	STK
**Division winners**
1	Seattle Seahawks	West	13	3	0	.813	4–2	10–2	.490	.445	W1
2	Carolina Panthers	South	12	4	0	.750	5–1	9–3	.494	.451	W3
3	Philadelphia Eagles	East	10	6	0	.625	4–2	9–3	.453	.391	W2
4	Green Bay Packers	North	8	7	1	.531	3–2–1	6–5–1	.453	.371	W1
**Wild cards**
5	San Francisco 49ers	West	12	4	0	.750	5–1	9–3	.494	.414	W6
6	New Orleans Saints	South	11	5	0	.688	5–1	9–3	.516	.455	W1
**Did not qualify for the postseason**
7	Arizona Cardinals	West	10	6	0	.625	2–4	6–6	.531	.444	L1
8 (Note: Chicago defeated Dallas head-to-head (Week 14, 45–28).)	Chicago Bears	North	8	8	0	.500	2–4	4–8	.465	.469	L2
9	Dallas Cowboys	East	8	8	0	.500	5–1	7–5	.484	.363	L1
10 (Note: The NY Giants and Detroit finished with a better conference record than St. Louis.) (Note: The NY Giants defeated Detroit head-to-head (Week 16, 23–20 (OT)).)	New York Giants	East	7	9	0	.438	3–3	6–6	.520	.366	W2
11 (Note: Detroit finished with a better conference record than St. Louis.)	Detroit Lions	North	7	9	0	.438	4–2	6–6	.457	.402	L4
12	St. Louis Rams	West	7	9	0	.438	1–5	4–8	.551	.446	L1
13	Minnesota Vikings	North	5	10	1	.344	2–3–1	4–7–1	.512	.450	W1
14 (Note: Atlanta finished with a better conference record than Tampa Bay.)	Atlanta Falcons	South	4	12	0	.250	1–5	3–9	.553	.313	L2
15	Tampa Bay Buccaneers	South	4	12	0	.250	1–5	2–10	.574	.391	L3
16	Washington Redskins	East	3	13	0	.188	0–6	1–11	.516	.438	L8
**Tiebreakers** (Note: When breaking ties for three or more teams under the NFL's rules, they are first broken within divisions, then comparing only the highest-ranked remaining team from each division.)
