= Ezekiel Ansah =

Ghanaian-born American football player (born 1989)

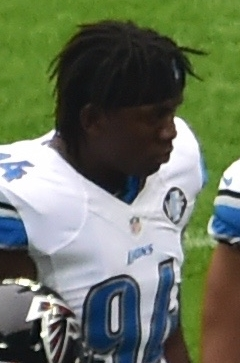
- Ansah with the Detroit Lions in 2014

No. 94
- Position: Defensive end

Personal information
- Born: May 29, 1989 (age 37); Accra, Ghana
- Listed height: 6 ft 5 in (1.96 m)
- Listed weight: 275 lb (125 kg)

Career information
- High school: Presbyterian Boys' Secondary (Legon, Ghana)
- College: BYU (2010–2012)
- NFL draft: 2013: 1st round, 5th overall pick

Career history
- Detroit Lions (2013–2018); Seattle Seahawks (2019); San Francisco 49ers (2020)

Awards and highlights
- Second-team All-Pro (2015); Pro Bowl (2015); PFWA All-Rookie Team (2013); First-team All-Independent (2012)

Career NFL statistics
- Total tackles: 236
- Sacks: 50.5
- Forced fumbles: 12
- Fumble recoveries: 5
- Pass deflections: 4
- Stats at Pro Football Reference

Ezekiel Nana "Ziggy" Ansah (born May 29, 1989) is a Ghanaian former professional American football defensive end. Born in Accra, Ghana, he moved to the United States to attend Brigham Young University, where he played college football for the Brigham Young Cougars. He was drafted by the Detroit Lions fifth overall in the 2013 NFL draft.

== Early life ==
Ansah grew up playing soccer and had never seen American football as a youth. In addition to soccer, Ansah was also an enthusiastic basketball fan. He regularly played pickup basketball games at Golden Sunbeam Montessori School where he attended from 4th grade to 9th grade. He developed his basketball interests and abilities on a turf donated by Forever Young Foundation (Steve Young). Ansah played on the Golden Sunbeam basketball team and became the most valuable player and led his team to win many games. Because of the school's basketball facility, attention was drawn from basketball enthusiasts including missionaries of the Church of Jesus Christ of Latter-day Saints (LDS Church). It was at these pickup basketball games with missionaries and students that Ansah developed a friendship with a missionary. Ansah was later baptized a member of the church at age 18. A missionary, who taught and baptized Ansah, kept in touch with Ansah after returning to the United States. The missionary later suggested that if he was serious about basketball, Ansah should come to Brigham Young University and try out for the basketball team.

=== High school education ===
Ansah joined the Presbyterian Boys' Senior Secondary School, Legon in 2004. He studied business. During his stay in the school, Ansah actively participated in sports, playing an active role in the basketball team while also participating in track and field sports. During his stay in high school, he was a resident of Kwansa House. He graduated from high school in June 2007 and returned to Golden Sunbeam as a teaching assistant where, in his spare time, he trained the pupils in basketball.

Under Ansah's mentoring, the Golden Sunbeam basketball team won several tournaments while playing international schools in Ghana. When the West African Senior Secondary Certificate Examination (WASSCE) results became public, Ansah had 7 A's and a B in his business program.

== College career ==
Ansah applied to and was accepted at Brigham Young University with the help and support of Golden Sunbeam and the assistance of his friend, former ICT teacher and mentor Alma Ohene-Opare, who was at BYU at the time. Ansah's academic records enabled him to receive an academic scholarship in 2008. Alma Ohene-Opare and later Ken Frei played critical roles in helping Ansah adjust to his new surroundings and culture in a new country. Ansah tried out for the BYU Cougars men's basketball team twice, but was cut from both the 2008 and 2009 teams.

After facing rejection in basketball, Ansah successfully walked on to the BYU Cougars track team, where he ran a 10.91 in the 100 meters in addition to clocking a time of 21.89 seconds in the 200 meters. Finally, Ansah was persuaded to try out for the BYU Cougars football team, successfully walked onto the team, and played for the Cougars from 2010 to 2012.

=== Sophomore season ===
Unfamiliar with American football, Ansah had to be instructed in basic rules and techniques, even needing help getting on his pads for the first time. Midway through the 2010 season, Ansah made his first collegiate appearance in the Cougars' game versus Wyoming, where he recorded his first tackle. During the 2010 season he saw action in six games on special teams and the defensive line, recording three tackles and a pass breakup.

=== Junior season ===
The 2011 season was Ansah's fourth year in school, but only third year of eligibility. He played sporadically on third downs as a defensive end or outside linebacker, recording seven total tackles for the season.

=== Senior season ===
For the 2012 season, Ansah resumed his role as a situation player. However, during week four, noseguard Eathyn Manumaleuna hurt his knee and Ansah took his place. Over the final nine games of the season, Ansah was third on the team in tackles (48), second in sacks (4.5) and first in tackles for loss (13).

For the 2012 season, the BYU Cougars led the nation in red zone defense (opponent red zone percentage of .62), was second in rushing defense (84.25 yards/game), third in 3rd down conversion percentage (27.71%) and total defense (allowing 26.33 yards/game), fourth in first down defense (14.83/game), and fifth in scoring defense (176 total points). Additionally, they were in the top 25 in passing defense (13th), quarterback sacks (22nd), fourth down conversion defense (23rd), and tackles for loss (25th).

== Professional career ==
=== Pre-draft ===
Ansah was not found on any of the 2012 preseason mock drafts for the 2013 NFL draft. By mid-season, he had moved up from unlisted to the late-first round or early second round with many analysts calling him the sleeper pick of the draft. Ansah further improved his draft stock with his "outstanding defensive player" outing in the 2013 Senior Bowl, where he recorded seven tackles (six solo), 1.5 sacks (for 13 yards), 3.5 tackles for loss (for 24 yards), a pass breakup, and a forced fumble.

In March 2013, reports began to circulate questioning the accuracy of Ansah's age. His passport, however, shows his date of birth as May 29, 1989.

Coming out of college, Ansah was projected by analysts and scouts to be a first round draft selection and was a consensus top 10 pick. He was ranked the top defensive end and the seventh best player by NFLDraftScout.com. Although he was thought of as a raw talent who was a boom or bust prospect that lacked stamina, his large frame, size, quickness, athletic ability, consistency, and unparalleled length and foot speed made many feel he was too valuable to pass on.

Pre-draft measurables
Height	Weight	Arm length	Hand span	Wingspan	40-yard dash	10-yard split	20-yard split	20-yard shuttle	Three-cone drill	Vertical jump	Broad jump	Bench press
6 ft 5 1/4 in (1.96 m)	271 lb (123 kg)	35 1/8 in (0.89 m)	10 1/4 in (0.26 m)	6 ft 10 3/8 in (2.09 m)	4.63 s	1.63 s	2.69 s	4.26 s	7.11 s	34.5 in (0.88 m)	9 ft 10 in (3.00 m)	21 reps
All values from NFL Combine

=== Detroit Lions ===
==== 2013 season ====
Ansah was selected by the Detroit Lions in the first round with the fifth overall pick in the 2013 NFL draft. On May 10, 2013, the Detroit Lions signed him to a fully guaranteed four-year, $18.59 million contract with a signing bonus of $11.90 million.

He entered training camp competing to be the right starting defensive end. In the first week of the preseason, Ansah intercepted Mark Sanchez and returned the ball 14 yards for the first score of the game. Head coach Jim Schwartz named him the backup right defensive end behind Willie Young to begin the regular season after his development was delayed due to a head injury he suffered in practice.

He made his professional regular season debut in the Detroit Lions' season opener against the Minnesota Vikings, made three combined tackles and was credited with half a sack on Christian Ponder in a 34–24 victory. On September 22, 2013, Ansah earned his first career start after Jason Jones was placed on injured reserve for the remainder of the season with a knee injury. He made a season-high seven combined tackles and sacked Robert Griffin III twice, one causing a fumble, in a 27–20 victory over the Washington Redskins. He returned in Week 12 after missing the previous two games with an ankle injury. In Week 12, he recorded two solo tackles and sacked Mike Glennon twice, as the Lions lost to the Tampa Bay Buccaneers 24–20. The following week, he made three solo tackles and two sacks on Matt Flynn in a 40–10 victory over the Green Bay Packers.

Ansah finished his rookie season with 32 combined tackles, 8 sacks, 2 forced fumbles, and a pass deflection in 14 games and 12 starts. His eight sacks led all NFL rookies and ranked second in Lions' rookie history. He was named the Mel Farr Rookie of the Year, honouring the Detroit Lions' most outstanding rookie. He was named to the PFWA All-Rookie Team.

==== 2014 season ====
He returned as the right defensive end in 2014 and was named the starting defensive end, by new head coach Jim Caldwell, to begin the regular season. In the season opener against the New York Giants, he recorded an assisted tackle and was credited with half a sack on Eli Manning in a 35–14 victory. On October 12, 2014, Ansah made five combined tackles and was credited with a season-high 2.5 sacks on Teddy Bridgewater, as the Detroit Lions defeated the Minnesota Vikings 17–3. In Week 10, he racked up a season-high six solo tackles and had one sack on Ryan Tannehill in a 20–16 win over the Miami Dolphins. Ansah finished his second season with 49 combined tackles, 7 1/2 sacks, and three forced fumbles in 16 games and 16 starts.

On January 4, 2015, Ansah started his first career playoff game and made two solo tackles and a sack on Tony Romo in a 24–20 loss to the Dallas Cowboys.

==== 2015 season ====
Ansah started the Lions season opener against the San Diego Chargers and made two solo tackles and a sack on Philip Rivers in a 33–28 loss. The next game, Ansah recorded a season-high seven solo tackles and a sack in a 26–16 loss to the Minnesota Vikings. On November 26, 2015, he racked up four combined tackles and was credited with a season-high 3 sacks on Mark Sanchez, as the Lions routed the Philadelphia Eagles 45–14.

In the 2015 season, Ansah made 47 combined tackles, 14 1/2 sacks, 4 forced fumbles, and a pass deflection in 16 games and 16 starts. He finished third in the league with 14 1/2 sacks (J. J. Watt 17 1/2, Khalil Mack 15) and passed William Gay (13 1/2 sacks in 1983) for the second-most sacks in a season by a Lions defensive player since 1982, trailing only Robert Porcher (15.0) set in 1999. Ansah was named to the Pro Bowl for the first time in his career. On January 31, 2016, during the Pro Bowl, Ansah was a part of Team Irvin and made one solo tackle in a 49–27 win over Team Rice. He was ranked 43rd by his fellow players on the NFL Top 100 Players of 2016.

==== 2016 season ====
On May 2, 2016, the Detroit Lions exercised the fifth-year option on Ansah's rookie contract that paid him $7.53 million for 2017.

He started the Lions season opener against the Indianapolis Colts and made two combined tackles in a 39–35 victory. The following week against the Tennessee Titans, Ansah injured his ankle on the second play of the game, and missed the next three games. In a Week 9 victory over the Minnesota Vikings, Ansah racked up a season-high five solo tackles. On December 18, 2016, he recorded five combined tackles, including sacking Eli Manning for Ansah's first sack of the season. He finished his season with 35 combined tackles and two sacks in 13 starts. The two sacks was a steep decline from the 14.5 he posted the previous year.

The Detroit Lions finished the year 9–7, and clinched a wild card spot. During the wild card round against the Seattle Seahawks, Ansah made five combined tackles and sacked Russell Wilson twice, but the Lions lost 26–6.

==== 2017 season ====
On September 18, 2017, against the New York Giants on Monday Night Football, Ansah recorded three sacks and six tackles in the 24–10 victory. Ansah finished the season with 12 sacks, a significant improvement over the 2 sacks he had in 2016. He recorded 3 sacks in one game on 3 different occasions, the first Lion to accomplish that feat. In Week 17, Ansah recorded three sacks in a 35–11 win over the Packers, earning him NFC Defensive Player of the Week.

==== 2018 season ====
On February 27, 2018, the Lions placed the franchise tag on Ansah that paid him $17.5 million in 2018. After suffering a shoulder injury in Week 1, Ansah missed the next six games before returning in Week 9. He played in the next six games before re-aggravating the shoulder injury in Week 14. He was placed on injured reserve on December 11, 2018.

=== Seattle Seahawks ===
On May 9, 2019, Ansah signed a one-year, $9 million deal with the Seattle Seahawks. Ansah dealt with nagging injuries once again, and only registered 2.5 sacks as a situational pass rusher for the team.

=== San Francisco 49ers ===
On September 23, 2020, Ansah signed a one-year deal with the San Francisco 49ers. In Week 4, he suffered a torn biceps and was placed on season-ending injured reserve on October 10.

== Career statistics ==
=== NFL ===
Year	Team	Games		Tackles				Fumbles		Interceptions					
Year	Team	GP	GS	Cmb	Solo	Ast	Sck	FF	FR	Int	Yds	Avg	Lng	TD	PD
2013	DET	14	12	32	19	13	8.0	2	0	0	0	0.0	0	0	1
2014	DET	16	16	49	37	12	7.5	3	0	0	0	0.0	0	0	0
2015	DET	16	16	47	39	8	14.5	4	2	0	0	0.0	0	0	1
2016	DET	13	13	35	21	14	2.0	0	0	0	0	0.0	0	0	0
2017	DET	14	14	44	39	5	12.0	1	1	0	0	0.0	0	0	0
2018	DET	7	2	11	7	4	4.0	0	0	0	0	0.0	0	0	0
2019	SEA	11	1	18	12	16	2.5	2	2	0	0	0.0	0	0	2
2020	SF	2	0	0	0	0	0.0	0	0	0	0	0.0	0	0	0
Career		93	74	236	174	62	50.5	12	5	0	0	0.0	0	0	4

=== College ===
Season	Team	GP	Tackles							Interceptions					Fumbles			Blkd	
Season	Team	GP	Solo	Ast	Cmb	TfL	Yds	Sck	Yds	Int	Yds	BU	PD	QBH	FF	FR	Yds	Kick	Saf
2010	Brigham Young	6	1	2	3	0	0	0.0	0	0	0	1	0	0	0	0	0	0	0
2011	Brigham Young	12	3	4	7	0	0	0.0	0	0	0	0	0	1	0	0	0	0	0
2012	Brigham Young	13	35	27	62	13	37	4.5	20	1	−2	9	0	6	1	0	0	0	0
Career		31	39	33	72	13	37	4.5	20	1	−2	10	0	7	1	0	0	0	0

== Personal life ==
Ansah is the youngest of five children. His father, Edward, was a sales manager for a petroleum company, and his mother, Elizabeth, was a nurse. Ansah is an active member of the Church of Jesus Christ of Latter-day Saints. Ansah was assigned to room with Kyle Van Noy, a highly touted linebacker, during the 2012 season. The two have maintained a close relationship both on and off the field. Ansah reported in a Sports Illustrated interview that, "Kyle is like a brother to me." While attending BYU, Ansah worked for several years as a custodian in order to pay his tuition (he stopped working when he was awarded a scholarship his senior year).
