= Palm Beach Gardens Community High School =

Location
- 4245 Holly Drive; Palm Beach Gardens, FL 33410; United States; 26.82494°N 80.10099°W

Information
- Type: Public Magnet
- Motto: Don't Just Be Gator, Be a Greater Gator!
- Established: 1969
- Principal: Michelle Fleming
- Teaching staff: 145.00 (FTE)
- Enrollment: 2,438 (2023-2024)
- Student to teacher ratio: 16.81
- Colors: Orange and blue
- Mascot: Gators
- Athletics: 8A
- Website: pbgh.palmbeachschools.org

Palm Beach Gardens Community High School is a public magnet high school for grades 9–12 in Palm Beach Gardens, Florida. The school mascot is the Gator. It was built in 1968 as a public high school. The original school was demolished and a new school opened in August 2009 – 2010.

In March 2019 principal Larry Clawson was offered a job at the district which he accepted. Former Howell L. Watkins Middle School Principal Dr. Don Hoffman became the high school's principal.

== Academics ==
Palm Beach Gardens' academic program is based on local School District of Palm Beach County policy, standards of the State of Florida. In addition, students are given the opportunity to join magnet programs such as global business and entrepreneurship, pre-med, sports management, tourism, TV and film production, and Culinary arts. The magnet programs are supplemented by two career-building organizations: Future Business Leaders of America (FBLA) and Health Occupations Students of America.

== Athletics ==
In 1973, the Gator football team went 10–0 during the regular season, its first and only undefeated season beating Fort Pierce Central High School Cobras. Due to a tie-breaking rule, the team could not participate in the state football championship, even though they were ranked the No. 1 team in the state. In 2005, the Gators won the Florida class 6A state championship in football. In April 2019, the school hired Tyrone Higgins II, a former linebacker, as its head football coach.

The softball team won states in 1985–1986, 1988–1991, 2005, 2006 and most recently in 2010 and 2011. In 2012 the softball team ranked No. 1 in the ESPN National Softball Fab50 ranking. They have also been states runners up in 1983, 2001 and 2008. Softball coach Randy Jackson had his 500th win in 2022.

The boys' basketball team won states in 1984.

The baseball team have won the district title 19 times, most recently in 2021 and 2022. The baseball team has won the regional championship five times, most recently in 2022 when they finished state runners up.

The Gator lacrosse team won the 2008 1A Florida State championship, finishing their season 20–0.

The girls' varsity golf team won the State title four consecutive years, 1971, 1972, 1973 and 1974, then won it back in 1989.

The boys' varsity golf team won district champs in 2020 and in regionals they took 3rd place

During the 2008 season, the girls' varsity golf team became the county's Conference Champion, District Champions, and Regional Champions. They were again district champions in 2021.

The girls' volleyball team were states runners up in 2017, 2018 and 2019.

Girls' swimming and diving won districts in 18'-20' and have been states runners up in 1970, 1971 and 1973.

The bowling team was states runners up in 1985.

CHAMPIONSHIPS
Year	Team
2011	6A Softball
2010	6A Softball
2008	1A Lacrosse
2006	6A Softball
2005	6A Football
2005	6A Softball
1991	4A Girls' softball
1990	4A Girls' softball
1989	Girls' Golf
1989	4A Girls' softball
1988	4A Girls' softball
1986	Girls' softball
1985	Girls' softball
1984	4A boys' basketball
1974	Girls' Golf
1973	Girls' Golf
1972	Girls' Golf
1971	Girls' Golf

== School specifics ==
=== Academic statistics ===
- Students per teacher: 25+
- Enrollment: 2,500 +
- Schoolwide reading proficiency: 31.5%
- Schoolwide math proficiency: 60.7%
- Graduation rate: 94.3%

=== School demographics ===
- African American/ Black: 88.7%
- White: 2.8%
- Hispanic: 3.2%
- Asian: 3%
- several more races: 1.6%
- Other race: .7%

== Controversies ==
In February 2009, during a routine check of school spending by the Palm Beach County School District it was found that Principal Jonathan Prince was improperly spending school funds. Some of these charges include gas for a personal vehicle, room service at a convention, restaurant bills for his family, a tuxedo rental, flowers for school secretaries and an end-of-year dinner for the assistant principals and guidance counselors. In response, Prince was forced to pay back thousands of dollars, serve 20 hours of community service, and was demoted to Assistant Principal to avoid criminal charges.

== Notable alumni ==
- Bob Baumhower, 1972 graduate, National Football League nose tackle for the Miami Dolphins
- Emanuel Cook, 2006 graduate, National Football League safety for the Baltimore Ravens
- Joe Grahe, 1985 graduate, member of the University of Miami Sports Hall of Fame, played Major League Baseball, 1990–1996
- Eric Kresser, 1992 graduate, National Football League quarterback for the Cincinnati Bengals
- Zach Miner, 2000 graduate, Major League Baseball pitcher for the Detroit Tigers, 2006–2009.
- Taylor Motter, 2008 graduate, Major League Baseball Utility player for the Seattle Mariners, 2016-
- Nick Rickles (born 1990), American-Israeli baseball catcher
- Pavin Smith, 2014 graduate, Major League Baseball, Arizona Diamondbacks
- Darren Studstill, 1988 graduate, National Football League defensive back for the Dallas Cowboys and Jacksonville Jaguars
- Chris Volstad, 2005 graduate, Major League Baseball pitcher for the Miami Marlins and the Chicago Cubs
- Keron Williams, 2002 graduate, Canadian Football League player for the BC Lions
- Willie Young (defensive end), 2004 graduate, National Football League defensive end for the Detroit Lions
- J.J. Schwarz, 2014 graduate, NCAA All American catcher- University of Florida, Oakland Athletics organization
