= Håvard Rugland =

Norwegian-born American football player (born 1984)

No. 3
- Position: Placekicker

Personal information
- Born: October 7, 1984 (age 42); Ålgård, Norway
- Listed height: 6 ft 2 in (1.88 m)
- Listed weight: 240 lb (109 kg)

Career history
- Detroit Lions (2013)*
- * Offseason or practice squad member only

Håvard Rugland (born October 7, 1984), nicknamed Kickalicious, is a Norwegian former football placekicker. His trick-shot videos gained him notoriety on YouTube. He was signed by the Detroit Lions in 2013 and released shortly thereafter.

== Professional career ==
On September 16, 2012, Rugland posted a video titled Kickalicious™ onto YouTube, under the name "bighdeluxe". After the video went viral, Rugland traveled to San Diego to train with retired NFL kicker Michael Husted. In December 2012, the New York Jets hosted a tryout for Rugland. In March 2013, Rugland worked out for the Cleveland Browns and the Lions, who later signed him in April. He competed with David Akers for the starting spot.

On August 9, 2013, Rugland made his NFL debut in a preseason game against the New York Jets, going 2-for-2 with a long field goal from 50 yards out. On August 24, 2013, Rugland was cut by the Lions in favor of Akers. He went 3-for-3 in preseason with field goals of 33, 49, and 50 yards. After Rugland cleared waivers, the Lions attempted to sign Rugland to their practice squad, but the league rejected the signing, claiming that the rule that the Lions had used to allow the signing was no longer valid. He then had a workout with the Green Bay Packers, but was not added to the Packers' opening day roster.

On January 28, 2015, Rugland and sponsor Pepsi Max Norway released a video titled Kickalicious™ part 2 on the latter's YouTube channel, in which Rugland showcases more trick-shot skills at famous natural landmarks throughout Norway. The video featured music by Norwegian punk rock band Turbonegro.
