= Joseph Fauria =

American football player (born 1990)

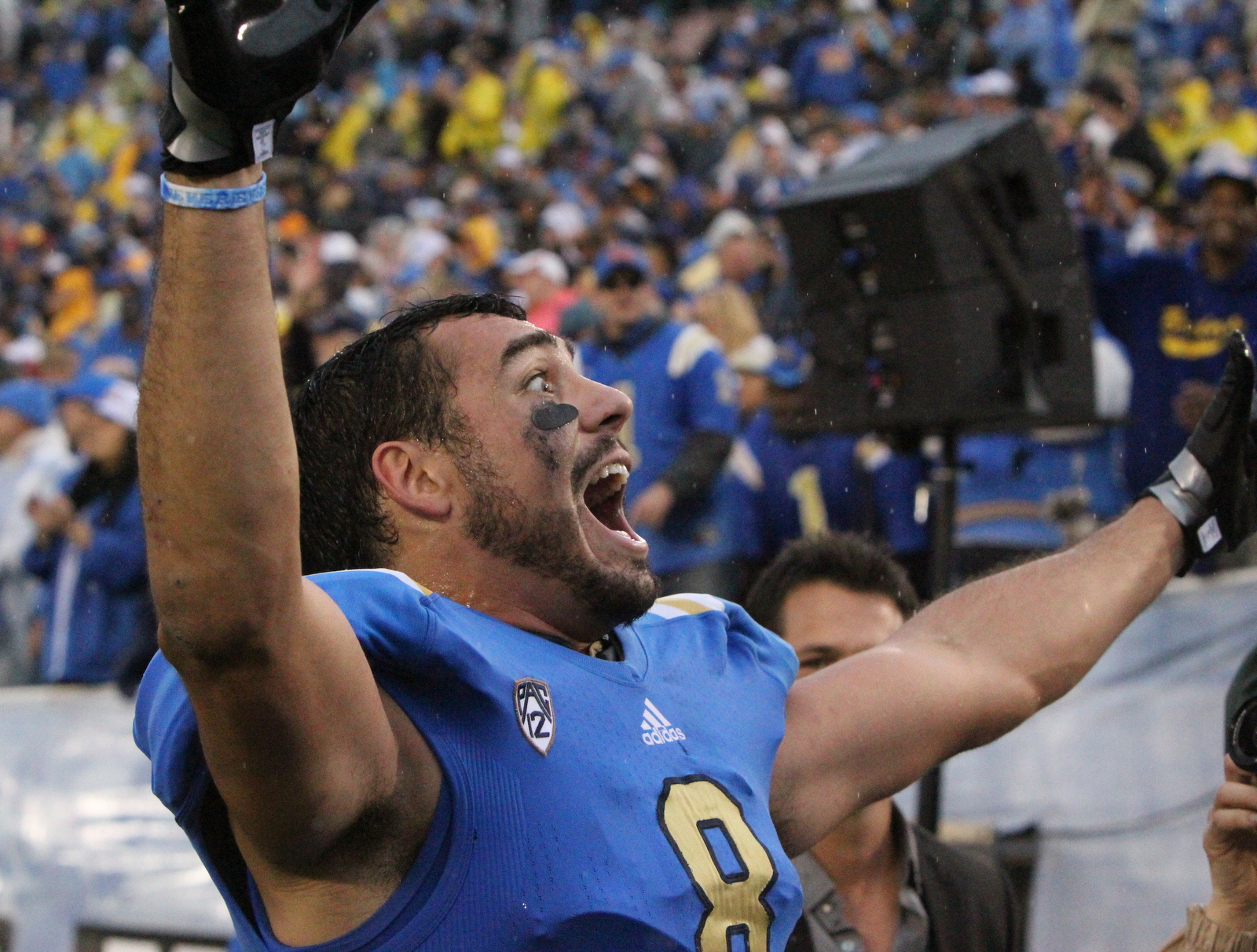
- Fauria with UCLA in 2012

No. 80
- Position: Tight end

Personal information
- Born: January 16, 1990 (age 36); Northridge, California, U.S.
- Listed height: 6 ft 7 in (2.01 m)
- Listed weight: 267 lb (121 kg)

Career information
- High school: Crespi Carmelite (Encino, California)
- College: Notre Dame (2008); UCLA (2009–2012)
- NFL draft: 2013: undrafted

Career history
- Detroit Lions (2013–2014); Arizona Cardinals (2015)*; New England Patriots (2015)*; Arizona Hotshots (2019)*
- * Offseason or practice squad member only

Career NFL statistics
- Receptions: 24
- Receiving yards: 281
- Receiving touchdowns: 8
- Stats at Pro Football Reference

Joseph Jules Fauria (/ˈfɔːrieɪ/; born January 16, 1990) is an American former professional football player who was a tight end in the National Football League (NFL). He was signed by the Detroit Lions as an undrafted free agent in 2013. He played college football for the Notre Dame Fighting Irish and UCLA Bruins.

== Early life ==
Fauria attended Crespi Carmelite High School in Encino, California. Fauria was named to the first-team all-state by CalHiSports.com. He was ranked the 7th best tight end prospect in the nation and was ranked the 24th prospect in the state of California by rivals.com.

College recruiting
Name	Hometown	School	Height	Weight	40^{‡}	Commit date
Joseph Fauria; Tight end	Encino, California	Crespi Carmelite High School	6 ft 8 in (2.03 m)	250 lb (110 kg)	4.75	Jan 18, 2008
Joseph Fauria; Tight end	Recruit ratings: Scout: Rivals:					
Overall recruit ranking: Scout: 11 (TE) Rivals: 7 (TE), 184 (National), 24 (California)
Note: In many cases, Scout, Rivals, 247Sports, On3, and ESPN may conflict in their listings of height and weight.; In these cases, the average was taken. ESPN grades are on a 100-point scale.; Sources: "2008 Notre Dame Football Commitments". Rivals.; "2008 Notre Dame Football Commits". Scout.; "Scout.com Team Recruiting Rankings". Scout.; "2008 Team Ranking". Rivals.com.

== College career ==
He played college football at Notre Dame and UCLA. On June 27, 2009, during his sophomore year, he was suspended by Notre Dame for "slapping a priest on the butt in jest", which led him to transfer to UCLA. He finished college with a total of 88 receptions, 1,139 receiving yards, and 20 receiving touchdowns.

== Professional career ==
Pre-draft measurables
Height	Weight	Arm length	Hand span	Wingspan	40-yard dash	10-yard split	20-yard split	20-yard shuttle	Three-cone drill	Vertical jump	Broad jump	Bench press
6 ft 7 3/8 in (2.02 m)	259 lb (117 kg)	33 3/4 in (0.86 m)	10 7/8 in (0.28 m)	6 ft 8 3/8 in (2.04 m)	4.72 s	1.71 s	2.79 s	4.53 s	7.49 s	35.5 in (0.90 m)	10 ft 0 in (3.05 m)	17 reps
All values from NFL Combine/UCLA's Pro Day

=== Detroit Lions ===
Fauria went undrafted in the 2013 NFL draft. On April 27, 2013, he signed with the Detroit Lions as a free agent. Fauria made the Lions' opening roster. He scored a touchdown in his first regular season game with the team, on a one-yard pass from Matthew Stafford. In a Week 6 matchup against the Cleveland Browns, Fauria caught a career-high three touchdowns on three catches for 34 yards. He finished his rookie season with only 18 receptions, but seven of those resulted in a touchdown.

Fauria's 2014 season was limited due to an ankle injury. In seven games, Fauria had six receptions for 74 yards and one touchdown. His sole touchdown came against the Tampa Bay Buccaneers on December 7.

=== Arizona Cardinals ===
On September 10, 2015, Fauria was signed by the Arizona Cardinals. On September 19, he was released by the Cardinals. On September 23, Fauria was re-signed to the Cardinals' practice squad. On October 2, the Cardinals placed Fauria on the practice squad injured list. On October 13, the Cardinals waived Fauria from their practice squad injured list.

=== New England Patriots ===
On November 18, 2015, the New England Patriots signed Fauria to their practice squad. He was released by the Patriots on December 8.

=== Arizona Hotshots ===
Fauria attempted a comeback with the Arizona Hotshots of the Alliance of American Football (AAF) in advance of the team and league's inaugural 2019 season but did not make the team's final roster on January 30, 2019.

== Personal life ==
Fauria is the nephew of Christian Fauria, who was also an NFL tight end from 1995 to 2007. Fauria was born in Woodland Hills, California, to Christian Fauria's older sister, Julie Ann Fauria. At Crespi Carmelite High School in Encino, California, he was a three-sport athlete, lettering in football, basketball, and volleyball. He was engaged to Ericka Hammond.
