= Willie Young (defensive end) =

American football player (born 1985)

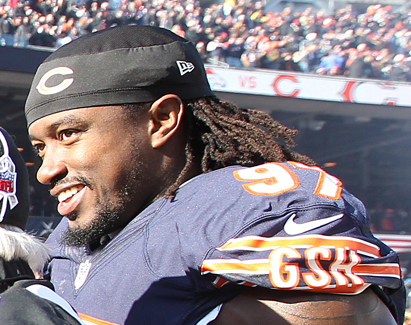
- Young with the Chicago Bears in 2015

No. 79, 97
- Position: Defensive end / Linebacker

Personal information
- Born: September 19, 1985 (age 41); Riviera Beach, Florida, U.S.
- Listed height: 6 ft 5 in (1.96 m)
- Listed weight: 258 lb (117 kg)

Career information
- High school: Palm Beach Gardens (FL)
- College: North Carolina State
- NFL draft: 2010: 7th round, 213th overall pick

Career history
- Detroit Lions (2010–2013); Chicago Bears (2014–2017)

Awards and highlights
- Second-team All-ACC (2009)

Career NFL statistics
- Total tackles: 186
- Sacks: 32
- Forced fumbles: 3
- Fumble recoveries: 2
- Interceptions: 1
- Stats at Pro Football Reference

Willie James Young Jr. (born September 19, 1985) is an American former professional football player who was a defensive end and linebacker in the National Football League (NFL). He was selected by the Detroit Lions in the seventh round of the 2010 NFL draft. He played college football for the NC State Wolfpack.

== Early life ==
Young was born on September 19, 1985, in Riviera Beach, Florida. He attended Palm Beach Gardens Community High School, where he played basketball and football as a defensive lineman and ran track. As a junior in 2003, he recorded 60 tackles including 15 for loss and nine quarterback sacks. As a senior, he recorded 65 tackles including 25 for loss and 12 sacks. Scout.com rated him a three-star college prospect, and he accepted a scholarship offer from NC State. Young has a younger brother named Avery Young who plays offensive tackle for the Tampa Bay Buccaneers of the National Football League (NFL).

== College career ==
Young attended North Carolina State University, from which he received a bachelor's degree in science and technology. He sat out the 2005 season on redshirt status. In 2006, he played in all 12 games including five starts and recorded 44 tackles, of which 24 were solo, and five for loss, one pass broken up, five quarterback hurries, and one interception returned 34 yards for a touchdown. In 2007, he saw action in all 12 games including eight starts. He recorded 16 tackles for loss, 24 quarterback hurries, and broke up six passes. In 2008, he started 12 games and recorded 12.5 tackles for loss, 6.5 sacks, and 26 quarterback hurries. The NFL Draft Scout rated Young the 18th-ranked defensive end of the 182 available for the 2010 NFL draft and projected him as a fifth or six round selection.

== Professional career ==
Pre-draft measurables
Height	Weight	Arm length	Hand span	40-yard dash	10-yard split	20-yard split	20-yard shuttle	Three-cone drill	Vertical jump	Broad jump	Bench press
6 ft 4 3/4 in (1.95 m)	251 lb (114 kg)	34 1/2 in (0.88 m)	10 1/4 in (0.26 m)	4.83 s	1.73 s	2.89 s	4.56 s	7.24 s	38 in (0.97 m)	10 ft 0 in (3.05 m)	25 reps
All values from NFL Combine/Pro Day

=== Detroit Lions ===
Young was selected by the Detroit Lions in the seventh round with the 213th overall pick in the 2010 NFL draft.

Young spent his rookie season inactive for all but two games. He played 14 games in the 2011 season.

In 2013, Young gained media attention after taunting the New England Patriot's quarterback, Tom Brady. In the second quarter of a pre-season game, Young helped force Brady to throw an incomplete pass. After the play, Young grabbed Brady's jersey and stuck his finger in the quarterback's face. As a result, a 15-yard penalty was thrown. In addition, Young was also benched after the play.

=== Chicago Bears ===
On March 13, 2014, Young signed a three-year, $9 million contract with the Chicago Bears to be a backup behind Lamarr Houston and Jared Allen. In Week 1 against the Buffalo Bills, Young notched his first sack of his Bears season in the Bears 20-23 overtime loss. In Week 2 against the San Francisco 49ers, Young notched 2 more sacks on Colin Kaepernick. In Week 3, he continued to rush the quarterback with success against the New York Jets, sacking Geno Smith once in the Bears' 27-19 victory. In Week 4, Willie Young did not notch a sack for the first time in his Bears career, although he did block a Mason Crosby kick. In Week 5 at the Carolina Panthers, he sacked Cam Newton once, although the Bears lost the game 24-31. In Week 6 against the Atlanta Falcons, he notched 2 more sacks in a Bears 27-13 victory over the Falcons. Unfortunately, the Chicago Bears defensive unit had increased injury and performance issues throughout the year which led to decreased production as a whole. Young went on to gain three more sacks throughout the season against the Minnesota Vikings, Dallas Cowboys, and New Orleans Saints. Willie Young ended the season with a career-high and team high 10 sacks.

With the Bears switching to a 3-4 base, Young was converted to outside linebacker in 2015. He recorded a sack in five consecutive games (weeks eleven to fifteen), the third player in franchise history to do so after Steve McMichael and Brian Urlacher.

On July 30, 2016, Young agreed to a two-year contract extension.

On October 10, 2017, Young was placed on injured reserve after suffering a torn triceps.

On February 28, 2018, Young was released by the Bears.

== NFL career statistics ==
Legend
**Bold**	Career high

=== Regular season ===
Year	Team	Games		Tackles					Interceptions					Fumbles			
Year	Team	GP	GS	Cmb	Solo	Ast	Sck	TFL	Int	Yds	TD	Lng	PD	FF	FR	Yds	TD
2010	DET	2	0	0	0	0	0.0	0	0	0	0	0	0	0	0	0	0
2011	DET	14	0	14	9	5	3.0	3	0	0	0	0	1	**1**	0	0	0
2012	DET	**16**	0	11	7	4	0.0	1	0	0	0	0	1	0	0	0	0
2013	DET	**16**	**15**	**47**	**29**	**18**	3.0	7	0	0	0	0	**5**	0	**2**	0	0
2014	CHI	15	8	39	28	11	**10.0**	**12**	0	0	0	0	2	**1**	0	0	0
2015	CHI	15	8	30	24	6	6.5	11	**1**	**39**	0	**39**	2	0	0	0	0
2016	CHI	**16**	12	38	21	17	7.5	8	0	0	0	0	2	**1**	0	0	0
2017	CHI	4	2	7	4	3	2.0	2	0	0	0	0	0	0	0	0	0
Total		98	45	186	122	64	32.0	44	1	39	0	39	13	3	2	0	0

=== Playoffs ===
Year	Team	Games		Tackles					Interceptions					Fumbles			
Year	Team	GP	GS	Cmb	Solo	Ast	Sck	TFL	Int	Yds	TD	Lng	PD	FF	FR	Yds	TD
2011	DET	**1**	0	**2**	**1**	**1**	**1.0**	0	0	0	0	0	0	**1**	0	0	0
Total		1	0	2	1	1	1.0	0	0	0	0	0	0	1	0	0	0
