= Kris Durham =

American football player (born 1988)

No. 16, 18, 17
- Position: Wide receiver

Personal information
- Born: March 17, 1988 (age 38); Rome, Georgia, U.S.
- Listed height: 6 ft 5 in (1.96 m)
- Listed weight: 215 lb (98 kg)

Career information
- High school: Calhoun (Calhoun, Georgia)
- College: Georgia
- NFL draft: 2011: 4th round, 107th overall pick

Career history
- Seattle Seahawks (2011); Detroit Lions (2012–2013); Tennessee Titans (2014); Oakland Raiders (2015)*; Parma Panthers (2017–2018)
- * Offseason or practice squad member only

Career NFL statistics
- Receptions: 55
- Receiving yards: 699
- Receiving touchdowns: 3
- Stats at Pro Football Reference

Kris Durham (born March 17, 1988) is an American former professional football player who was a wide receiver in the National Football League (NFL). He played college football for the Georgia Bulldogs and was selected by the Seattle Seahawks in the fourth round of the 2011 NFL draft. Durham played in the NFL for the Seahawks, Detroit Lions, Tennessee Titans, and in the Italian Football League (IFL) for the Parma Panthers.

== Early life ==
Durham was born in Rome, Georgia, and was a stand-out wide receiver for the Calhoun High School Yellow Jackets football team. In his senior year, Durham helped lead the Yellow Jackets to a 14–1 record and an appearance in the state championship under coach Hal Lamb. Coming out of high school, Durham was rated as a 3-star prospect by both Scout.com and Rivals Inc. Durham signed a scholarship to play for the University of Georgia and enrolled in January 2006.

== College career ==
As a freshman in 2006, Durham recorded eight catches for 82 yards with Georgia. Durham improved in his sophomore season finishing with 11 catches for 169 yards. Durham played in the 2008 Sugar Bowl against the Hawaii, catching three passes for 48 yards. Durham appeared in 10 games during his junior season in 2008. He caught 13 passes for a total of 199 yards and caught his first touchdown pass of his college career. While participating in spring practice in 2009, Durham tore the labrum in his left shoulder and it was later announced that he would miss the entire 2009 season.

As a senior, Durham set career-highs with 32 catches for 659 yards and three touchdowns, including 100-yard games against Arkansas and Vanderbilt. In his collegiate career with the Bulldogs, he caught 64 passes for 1,109 yards, and four touchdowns, in 47 games, of which he started 15.

== Professional career ==
Pre-draft measurables
Height	Weight	Arm length	Hand span	40-yard dash	10-yard split	20-yard split	20-yard shuttle	Three-cone drill	Vertical jump	Broad jump	Bench press
6 ft 5 1/4 in (1.96 m)	217 lb (98 kg)	33 5/8 in (0.85 m)	10 in (0.25 m)	4.43 s	1.66 s	2.59 s	4.09 s	6.69 s	36.5 in (0.93 m)	10 ft 3 in (3.12 m)	17 reps
All values from Pro Day

=== Seattle Seahawks ===
Durham was selected in the fourth round as the 107th overall pick in the 2011 NFL draft by the Seattle Seahawks. He signed a contract for four years and $2.504 million, which included a $464,260 signing bonus.

In the 2011 season, Durham only played in three regular season games for Seattle before being placed on the injured reserve list.

Durham was cut at the end of the Seahawks' training camp in 2012.

=== Detroit Lions ===
Durham signed with the Detroit Lions practice squad on September 2, 2012, and was elevated to the active roster on December 4, joining his former college roommate, quarterback Matthew Stafford. Durham recorded his first NFL touchdown catch in the Lions' final game of the 2012 season on December 30, on a 25-yard pass from Stafford.

Durham had a larger role with the Lions in 2013 after being elevated to a starter after a Week 3 injury to Nate Burleson. He finished with 38 receptions for 490 receiving yards and two receiving touchdowns.

The Lions cut Durham prior to the 2014 regular season.

=== Tennessee Titans ===
On August 31, 2014, Durham was claimed off waivers by the Tennessee Titans. He appeared in four games in the 2014 season and had six receptions for 54 receiving yards.

=== Oakland Raiders ===
Durham signed with the Oakland Raiders in June 2015.

=== Parma Panthers ===
In 2017 and 2018, Durham signed with the Parma Panthers of the Italian Football League. In 2017, Durham played nine games, catching 33 passes for 509 yards and two touchdowns. In 2018, Durham played ten games and had 46 receptions for 944 yards and 11 touchdowns. The Panthers lost in the league playoffs semi finals in both seasons, failing to reach the Italian Bowl Championship game.

== Personal life ==
Durham is the brother-in-law of Los Angeles Angels pitcher Blake Wood. Durham returned to Italy as an assistant coach for the Parma Panthers in 2020.
