= Practice squad =

Group of players signed by a team but not part of their main roster

In gridiron football, the practice squad, also called the taxi squad or practice roster, is a group of players signed by a team but not part of their main roster. They serve as extra players during the team's practices, often as part of the scout team by emulating an upcoming opponent's play style. Because the players on the practice squad are familiar with the team's plays and formations, the practice squad serves as a way to develop inexperienced players for promotion to the main roster. This is particularly important for professional gridiron football teams, which do not have formal minor league farm team affiliates to train players. In addition, it provides replacement players for the main roster when players are needed as the result of injuries or other roster moves, such as bereavement leave.

== National Football League ==
=== History ===
During the 1940s, Cleveland Browns coach Paul Brown invented the "taxi squad", a group of promising scouted players who did not make the roster but were kept on reserve. To avoid All-America Football Conference payroll rules, team owner Arthur "Mickey" McBride, put them instead on the payroll of his taxicab company, Yellow Cab of Cleveland, though those players never performed any work for Yellow Cab. The name stuck, and the practice of retaining a squad of ready reserves spread throughout professional football. However, the National Football League (NFL) did not officially recognize the existence of taxi squads until February 18, 1965. On that date, the NFL team owners formally adopted a 40-man active roster supplemented by a taxi squad of unregulated size, which was officially termed the "future list." Over the next few seasons, the NFL gradually limited the allowable number of inactive players to seven, and regulations were established in relation to injured reserve and waiver practices. In 1974, the NFL eliminated the taxi squad altogether, moving the seven inactive spots into an expanded 47-man active roster. Beginning in 1977, a more limited inactive system was introduced (often consisting of either two or four players, depending on the season), and these players were sometimes referred to as taxi squad members.

=== Mechanism ===
Players may be signed to a practice squad for several reasons: for lack of space on the team, due to injury, or because they require more development. Practice squad players can be signed to any team's 53-man active roster, without compensation to their former team, at any time during the season. Many NFL players spent time on practice squads before finding success in the league, such as linebacker James Harrison, safety Adrian Phillips, offensive tackle Jason Peters, wide receiver Danny Amendola, running backs Danny Woodhead and Arian Foster, and center Kyle Cook.

The practice squad is only in effect during the regular season and postseason. Once a team's season finishes, practice squad players are typically signed to reserve/futures contracts by their teams, enabling them to be members of the team's 90-man offseason roster at the start of the new league year in March. Typical practice squad contracts automatically terminate one week after the team's final regular season or postseason game of the season.

The 2020 collective bargaining agreement allowed for teams to elevate up to two players per week to the active roster from the practice squad. Such promotions must be made the day before the team's game, and allow the player to automatically revert to the practice squad without having to clear waivers. Players were allowed to be elevated to active rosters for up to two weeks in a regular season starting in 2020, and up to three weeks starting in 2022.

Due to the COVID-19 pandemic, beginning in 2020, teams were able to designate up to four practice squad player protections, which prevented other teams from signing those players to their active rosters. Practice squad protections ended after the 2021 season. Additional protocols were in place for activation of large numbers of practice squad players in the event of an outbreak.

=== Squad size ===
In the 1993 collective bargaining agreement, practice squads were limited to five players. The practice squad expanded to eight players on April 1, 2004, following a vote from NFL owners. In August 2014, the practice squad expanded to 10 players. The 2020 collective bargaining agreement increased the size of practice squads to 12 players starting in 2020 and 14 players beginning in 2022, but due to the COVID-19 pandemic, the NFL increased the practice squad size to 16 for the 2020 season. This size increase was made permanent effective with the 2022 season.

=== Eligibility ===
In 1998, eligibility limits were imposed to allow only players without an accrued season or players who had one accrued season but were active for fewer than nine games that season. Players could only be members of the practice squad for up to two seasons. One practice squad season was defined in 1998 as having been on the squad for at least three games in a season, with bye weeks counting as a game.

In 2006, a third practice squad season for a player became possible as long as the team had 53 players on their active roster for the duration of the player's time on the practice squad that season. The player was considered to have served a third season as a practice squad member if they were on the squad for at least one game that season.

Until the 2011 season, games in which a player is listed as the third-string quarterback (using the third quarterback rule) did not count as being on the active list. Former quarterback Mike Quinn, who was listed as the third-string quarterback for several teams throughout his career, was practice squad eligible during his eighth NFL season.

In August 2014, eligibility was expanded by increasing the number of games in a season a player must be on the squad in order for that season to count as one of the player's three seasons of eligibility from three games to six games. Finally, each practice squad could include two players who have accrued too much playing time to be eligible for the squad under the previous rules, though these players may have no more than two accrued seasons in the league. Starting with the 2016 season, up to four veteran players were allowed to be on the practice squad. Beginning in 2022, up to six veteran players with two or more accrued seasons were allowed on a team's practice squad at a time.

=== Salaries ===
The minimum weekly salary for practice squad players:

- 1993 to 1997: $3,300
- 1998 to 1999: $3,650
- 2000 to 2002: $4,000
- 2003 to 2004: $4,350
- 2006 to 2007: $4,700
- 2008 to 2010: $5,200
- 2011 to 2012: $5,700
- 2013: $6,000
- 2014: $6,300
- 2015: $6,600
- 2016: $6,900
- 2017: $7,200
- 2018: $7,600
- 2019: $8,000
- 2020: $8,400
- 2021: $9,200 (standard)
- 2022: $11,500 (standard)
- 2023: $12,000 (standard)
- 2024: $12,500 (standard)
- 2025: $13,000 (standard)
- 2026: $13,750 (standard)
- 2027: $14,500 (standard)
- 2028: $15,250 (standard)
- 2029: $16,000 (standard)
- 2030: $16,750 (standard)

Starting with the 2021 season, there are two NFL practice squad salary scales. The first group (standard) is composed of rookies and players with two or fewer accrued seasons, while the second consists of NFL veterans with no limit to the accrued seasons in the league. The "veteran" group has minimum and maximum practice squad salaries:

- 2021: $14,000 minimum to $14,000 maximum
- 2022: $15,400 minimum to $19,900 maximum
- 2023: $16,100 minimum to $20,600 maximum
- 2024: $16,800 minimum to $21,300 maximum
- 2025: $17,500 minimum to $22,000 maximum
- 2026: $18,350 minimum to $22,850 maximum
- 2027: $19,200 minimum to $23,700 maximum
- 2028: $20,050 minimum to $24,550 maximum
- 2029: $20,900 minimum to $25,400 maximum
- 2030: $21,750 minimum to $26,250 maximum

Those on the practice squad are paid 18 weeks a year for the regular season, like active players, however unlike the latter there are no signing bonuses nor guaranteed salaries. Practice squad players earn considerably less than active squad players: in 2020, the minimum salary for a practice squad player was $8,400 per week ($142,800 for 17 weeks), and the minimum rookie salary was $610,000. Some practice squad players are paid considerably more, however. In 2006, the New England Patriots paid third-year player Billy Yates the full $425,000 he would have earned as a member of the team's active roster.

== Canadian Football League ==
The Canadian Football League (CFL) follows similar rules to the NFL with regards to practice squad players, but has unique rules due to its nationality-based player designation and roster ratio system, where Canadian citizens are considered "national" players and non-Canadians are considered either "American" or "global" players. Each CFL team is normally limited to 10 players on their practice squads (2 of which must be national players) and their salaries count against their teams' salary caps. A CFL practice squad roster may further be expanded to 12 with "global" players (see "international players" below). Due to the CFL seasons starting before the NFL's and its position as a smaller sister-league to the NFL, each team's practice squad is temporarily expanded to 15 players (17 when counting "global" players) following the NFL's roster cuts at the beginning of the NFL season; the extra 5 players do not count against a team's salary cap.

== XFL and NFL Europe ==
During the abbreviated 2020 debut season of the second incarnation of the XFL, the league operated a centralized "Team 9" that acted as both a practice squad and farm team for the entire league in lieu of individual teams having their own practice squads. This team had its own coaches and staff but did not play any on-record games. Team 9 players were paid the league minimum salary for inactive players, $1,040 per week. Team 9 did not return when the XFL resumed play in 2023. A similar system was reportedly used by the now-defunct NFL Europe, the NFL's European developmental league.

== College and high school football ==
In college football, players who are on a team's roster and practice with the team but do not play are known as redshirts. Redshirts consist mostly of freshmen and of transfer students who are not eligible to play in games due to NCAA rules. If a player sits through one entire season as a redshirt, that season does not count toward their limit of four years of eligibility to play college football; in rare circumstances, usually stemming from major injuries, a player may be granted a second redshirt year. Before the 2018 season, a player lost redshirt status with his first game appearance in that season; since then, redshirt status is lost only if the player appears in more than four games during that season. Prior to 1972, the NCAA prohibited freshmen from participating in varsity games, though they could practice with the varsity team and compete on separate freshmen teams, similar to junior varsity teams in high school football.

== International players ==
The practice squad has also been used by professional teams and leagues as a way to bring in and train players from outside the United States or Canada, where gridiron football is not a popular sport, as an attempt to foster international interest. In the CFL, players from outside Canada were previously designated as "international" players. This designation was usually in reference to American players (which now have their own "American" designation), but a subset designation of "international" players known as "global" players was implemented in 2019 to refer to players originating from outside the United States and Canada. This section, for both the NFL and CFL, refers to players that would be eligible for the CFL's "global" designation.

=== NFL ===
The NFL has operated programs in which selected international players were assigned to teams' practice squads as an extra member who did not count towards a team's maximum practice squad size.

The first, called the International Practice Squad Program, began operation in 2004. In 2005, Rolando Cantu of Mexico was promoted to the Arizona Cardinals' active roster after spending the previous season on the practice squad as a member of the program. Players from the United Kingdom, France, Germany, Finland, Sweden, Japan, and Russia also participated. In 2008, the program sponsored sixteen players, the largest number ever. The program was discontinued for 2009. The rule allowing for an extra practice squad player of international origin, however, remained in the NFL's rulebook and teams attempted to use the rule even after the demise of the program. For example, in 2013 the Detroit Lions attempted to use it to add Norwegian kicker Håvard Rugland to their practice squad, but were rejected by the NFL, which stated that the rule was meant to be used for players from NFL Europe, which folded after the 2007 season.

A new program, the International Player Pathway (IPP), was created in 2017. This new initiative started as a trial involving only NFC South teams. Each team in the division was allowed to sign one international player to its practice squad who would not count against the normal 10-player limit, but would not be eligible to be activated during the season after being signed. The IPP was expanded to eight teams (NFC South and AFC North) for the 2018 season. The IPP was opened to all NFL teams in 2024 and the NFL began allowing IPP players to be elevated to gameday rosters for up to three games per season, as with regular practice squad players.

Additionally, several international players have tried to find their starts in the NFL through spending time on teams' practice squads without having initially been part of these programs, such as Efe Obada, Moritz Böhringer, and Jarryd Hayne.

=== CFL ===
In the CFL, the "global" player designation was started in 2019 as part of an international partnership with amateur and semi-pro leagues in Mexico and Europe. In addition to the requirement of each CFL team to have one "global" player on their active rosters, each team may have a maximum of two "global" players on their practice squad who do not count against the team's normal practice squad size limit. Each "global" player designated is paid the CFL minimum salary and a portion of their salary may be sent back to the leagues they were taken from, depending on partnership arrangements; players taken from Mexico, for example, currently have 10% of their salaries sent to the Liga de Fútbol Americano Profesional, Mexico's top level American football league.

== Other sports ==
In the National Hockey League, the term "taxi squad" was used for the 2020–21 season to describe a group of players who traveled with but did not play for their respective teams until called upon to do so in the event that a positive COVID-19 case on the team forced the club to make a call-up immediately. The concept was used exclusively for that season; league deputy commissioner Bill Daly said it would likely not be used in future seasons as it was devised solely to circumvent the difficulties in summoning back-up players that were presented by the COVID-19 pandemic. On December 26, 2021, after a large number of disruptions to the 2021–22 season schedule due to COVID-19 issues within teams (including a suspension of all games from December 23–27), the NHL announced that it would reinstate the rule.

Nippon Professional Baseball (NPB), Japan's major baseball league, utilizes a developmental player system that allows its teams to sign an unrestricted number of developmental players, who cannot play in NPB games but a limited number per game may play in the NPB's minor leagues.

== Bibliography ==
- Cantor, George (2008). Paul Brown: The Man Who Invented Modern Football. Chicago: Triumph Books. ISBN 978-1-57243-725-8.
- "NFL–NFLPA Collective Bargaining Agreement 2020" (PDF). NFLPA. March 5, 2020.
