= 2014 Detroit Lions season =

NFL team season

- Owner: Martha Firestone Ford
- General manager: Martin Mayhew
- Head coach: Jim Caldwell
- Offensive coordinator: Joe Lombardi
- Defensive coordinator: Teryl Austin
- Home stadium: Ford Field

Results
- Record: 11–5
- Division place: 2nd NFC North
- Playoffs: Lost Wild Card Playoffs (at Cowboys) 20–24
- All-Pros: DT Ndamukong Suh (1st team); S Glover Quin (2nd team); LB DeAndre Levy (2nd team)
- Pro Bowlers: WR Calvin Johnson; FS Glover Quin; QB Matthew Stafford; DT Ndamukong Suh; WR Golden Tate

Uniform
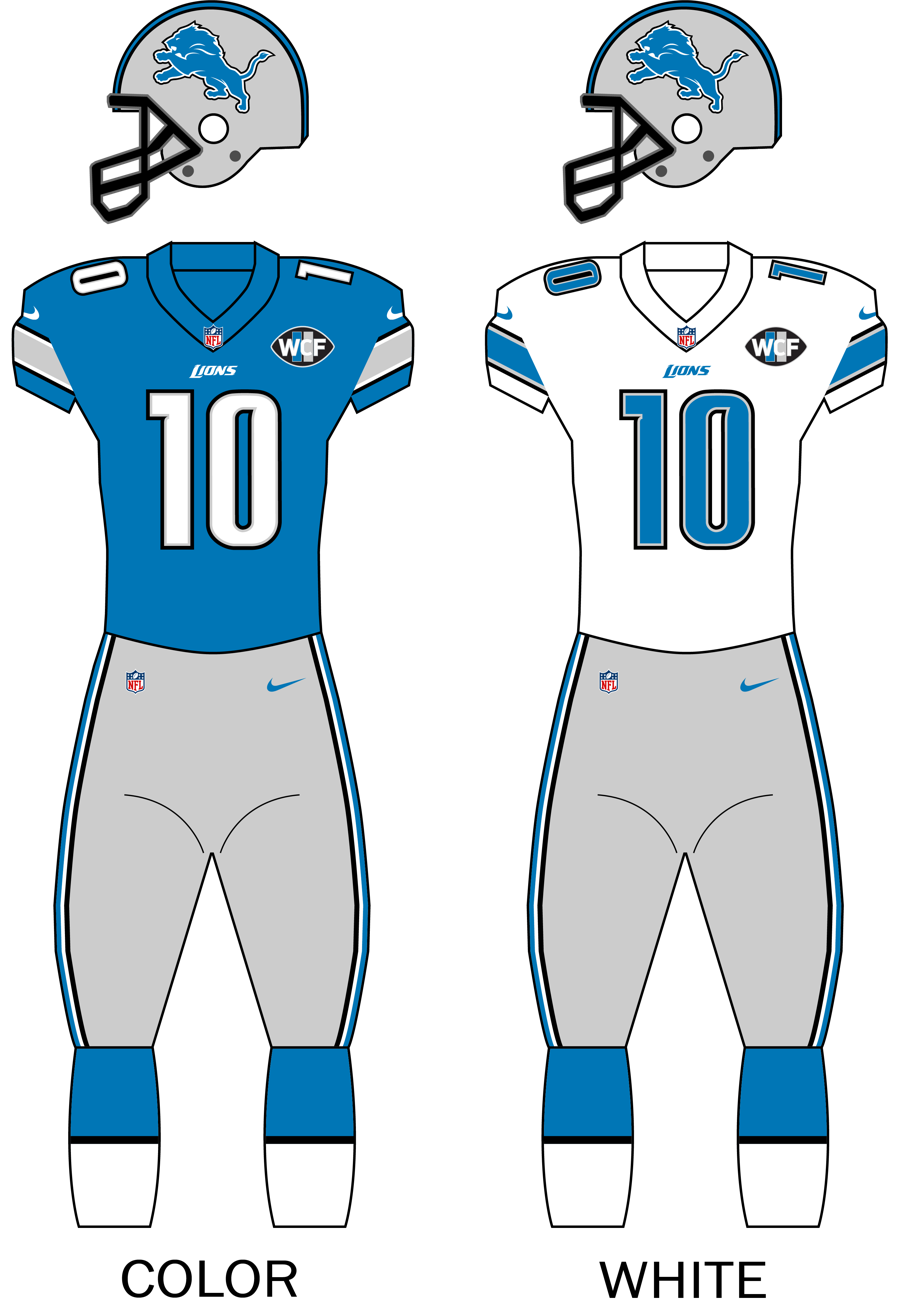

The 2014 season was the Detroit Lions' 85th in the National Football League (NFL), their 81st as the Detroit Lions and their first under a new coaching staff led by head coach Jim Caldwell. The Lions suffered the passing of long-time owner William Clay Ford Sr., who died on March 9, 2014, at the age of 88, and wore patches with his initials on their jerseys in his honor. After the Philadelphia Eagles lost to the Washington Redskins in Week 16, the Lions clinched a playoff berth for the first time since 2011. They lost to the Dallas Cowboys in the Wild Card Game 24–20, ending their season. It was their eighth straight playoff loss, tying the Kansas City Chiefs for the longest postseason losing streak in NFL history.

The Lions defense finished second in the NFL in total defense, surrendering just 300.9 yards per game. They also finished third in points per game defense, giving up just 17.6 points a game while leading the NFL in rushing defense, yielding just 69.3 rush yards per game.

== Offseason ==
=== Coaching staff ===
- On December 30, Head coach Jim Schwartz was fired after his fourth losing season in five years.
- On January 14, the Lions hired Jim Caldwell as their new head coach. He is the first African American head coach in the franchise's history.
- On January 17, the Lions hired Teryl Austin as defensive coordinator.
- On January 18, the Lions hired Ron Prince as assistant head coach and tight ends coach.
- On January 21, the Lions hired Joe Lombardi as offensive coordinator.
- On January 25, the Lions hired Robert Prince as receivers coach.

=== Re-signings ===
Date	Player	Position	Contract	Source
March 12	Kevin Ogletree	Wide receiver	1 year / $795,000	
March 12	Joique Bell	Running back	3 years / $9.3 million	
March 14	Brandon Pettigrew	Tight end	4 years / $16 million	
March 21	Andre Fluellen	Defensive tackle	1 year / $730,000	
April 14	Rashean Mathis	Cornerback	1 year / $565,000	

=== Additions ===
Date	Player	Position	Previous team	Contract	Source
March 3	Corvey Irvin	Defensive tackle	Dallas Cowboys	1 year / $730,000	
March 12	Golden Tate	Wide receiver	Seattle Seahawks	5 years / $31 million	
March 13	Darryl Tapp	Outside linebacker	Washington Redskins	1 year / $920,000	
March 13	Vaughn Martin	Defensive tackle	Miami Dolphins	1 year / $795,000	
March 19	Jed Collins	Fullback	New Orleans Saints	1 year / $710,000	
March 25	James Ihedigbo	Safety	Baltimore Ravens	2 years / $3.15 million	
April 2	Dan Orlovsky	Quarterback	Tampa Bay Buccaneers	1 year / $920,000	
April 3	J. B. Shugarts	Offensive tackle	New York Jets	1 year / $420,000	
April 7	Cassius Vaughn	Cornerback	Indianapolis Colts	1 year / $730,000	
April 11	Kourtnei Brown	Defensive end	Buffalo Bills	1 year / $420,000	
April 21	Aaron Hester	Cornerback	Denver Broncos	1 year / $420,000	
April 21	Nate Ness	Cornerback	Carolina Panthers	1 year / $570,000	
April 22	George Johnson	Defensive end	Minnesota Vikings	1 year / $730,000	
April 25	Sherman Carter	Center	San Francisco 49ers	1 year / $420,000	
April 25	Naaman Roosevelt	Wide receiver	Cleveland Browns	1 year / $570,000	
April 28	Jordan Thompson	Tight end	West Virginia	1 year / $420,000	
May 12	James Franklin	Quarterback	Missouri	Undrafted FA	
May 12	Cornelius Lucas	Offensive tackle	Kansas State	Undrafted FA	
May 12	Andrew Peacock	Wide receiver	Appalachian State	Undrafted FA	
May 12	Mohammed Seisay	Cornerback	Nebraska	Undrafted FA	
May 12	Gabe Lynn	Safety	Oklahoma	Undrafted FA	
May 12	Chad Abram	Fullback	Florida State	Undrafted FA	
May 12	Alex Bullard	Guard	Tennessee	Undrafted FA	
May 12	D.J. Morrell	Guard	Old Dominion	Undrafted FA	
May 12	Justin Jackson	Linebacker	Wake Forest	Undrafted FA	
May 12	Jacob Maxwell	Tight end	Louisiana–Lafayette	Undrafted FA	
May 12	Jerome Couplin	Safety	William & Mary	Undrafted FA	
May 16	Nate Freese	Placekicker	Boston College	4 years / $2,279,424	
May 16	Caraun Reid	Defensive tackle	Princeton	4 years / $2,408,880	
May 16	Larry Webster III	Defensive end	Bloomsburg	4 years / $2,545,050	
May 16	Nevin Lawson	Cornerback	Utah State	4 years / $2,545,050	
May 16	T. J. Jones	Wide receiver	Notre Dame	4 years / $2,326,200	
May 19	Gregory Hickman	Defensive tackle	Florida International	3 years / $1,530,000	
May 22	Travis Swanson	Center	Arkansas	4 years / $2,989,314	
June 2	Kalonji Kashama	Defensive end	Eastern Michigan	1 year / –	
June 2	Cody Wilson	Wide receiver	Miami Dolphins	1 year / –	
June 4	Kyle Van Noy	Outside linebacker	Brigham Young	4 years / $5.1 million	
June 13	Eric Ebron	Tight end	North Carolina	4 years / $12.2 million	
July 16	George Winn	Running back	Atlanta Falcons	1 year / –	
July 17	Garrett Reynolds	Guard	Atlanta Falcons	1 year / $745,000	
July 25	Drew Butler	Punter	Chicago Bears	1 year / –	
July 31	Kris Redding	Defensive end	Wake Forest	1 year / –	
August 7	Drayton Florence	Cornerback	Carolina Panthers	1 year / –	
October 7	Matt Prater	Placekicker	Denver Broncos		

=== Departures ===
Date	Player	Position	Note	New team	Source
February 13	Nate Burleson	Wide receiver	Released	Cleveland Browns	
February 13	Louis Delmas	Safety	Released	Miami Dolphins	
March 3	Leroy Harris	Offensive guard	Released		
March 13	Willie Young	Defensive end	UFA	Chicago Bears	
March 18	Israel Idonije	Defensive end	UFA	Chicago Bears	
April 2	Jason Curtis Fox	Offensive tackle	UFA	Miami Dolphins	
May 12	Cody Wilson	Wide receiver	Released		
May 12	Jon Morgan	Linebacker	Released		
May 12	Nate Ness	Cornerback	Released		
May 12	Matt Veldman	Tight end	Released		
May 12	John Potter	Placekicker	Released		
May 12	Carlin Isles	Wide receiver	Released		
May 12	Akwasi Owusu-Ansah	Cornerback	Released		
May 19	Corvey Irvin	Defensive tackle	Released	Calgary Stampeders (CFL)	
May 30	Kourtnei Brown	Defensive end	Released		
June 2	Vaughn Martin	Defensive tackle	Released		
June 13	Chris Houston	Cornerback	Released		
July 16	D.J. Morrell	Guard	Released		
July 17	J. B. Shugarts	Offensive tackle	Released		
July 18	Naaman Roosevelt	Wide receiver	Released	Buffalo Bills	
July 25	Gabe Lynn	Safety	Released		
July 28	Kalonji Kashama	Defensive end	Released		
July 31	Cody Wilson	Wide receiver	Released		

=== Draft ===
2014 Detroit Lions draft
Round	Pick	Player	Position	College	Notes
1	10	Eric Ebron *	TE	North Carolina	
2	40	Kyle Van Noy	OLB	BYU	
3	76	Travis Swanson	C	Arkansas	
4	133	Nevin Lawson	CB	Utah St	Compensatory
4	136	Larry Webster	DE	Bloomsburg	Compensatory
5	158	Caraun Reid	DT	Princeton	Pick from DAL
6	189	T.J. Jones	WR	Notre Dame	
7	229	Nate Freese	K	Boston College	Pick from DAL
Made roster † Pro Football Hall of Fame * Made at least one Pro Bowl during career

Notes

- The Lions traded their original fifth-round selection (No. 150 overall) to the Jacksonville Jaguars in exchange for wide receiver Mike Thomas.
- The Lions traded their fifth-round pick (146 overall) to Dallas in exchange for a fifth-round pick (158 overall) and a seventh-round pick (229 overall).

== Final roster ==
2014 Detroit Lions roster
Quarterbacks (QB): 17 Kellen Moore; 8 Dan Orlovsky; 9 Matthew Stafford; Running backs (RB): 35 Joique Bell; 21 Reggie Bush; 45 Jed Collins FB; 25 Theo Riddick; 38 George Winn; Wide receivers (WR): 84 Ryan Broyles; 10 Corey Fuller; 81 Calvin Johnson; 12 Jeremy Ross RS; 15 Golden Tate; Tight ends (TE): 89 Kellen Davis; 85 Eric Ebron; 87 Brandon Pettigrew	Offensive linemen (OL): 74 Rodney Austin G; 62 Darren Keyton G; 77 Cornelius Lucas T; 71 Riley Reiff T; 70 Garrett Reynolds T; 67 Rob Sims G; 64 Travis Swanson C/G; 75 Larry Warford G; Defensive linemen (DL): 94 Ezekiel Ansah DE; 98 Nick Fairley DT; 96 Andre Fluellen DT; 93 George Johnson DE; 91 Jason Jones DE; 99 CJ Mosley DT; 97 Caraun Reid DT; 90 Ndamukong Suh DT; 52 Darryl Tapp DE; 92 Devin Taylor DE; 79 Larry Webster DE	Linebackers (LB): 57 Josh Bynes OLB; 54 DeAndre Levy OLB; 58 Ashlee Palmer OLB; 49 Julian Stanford MLB; 95 Kyle Van Noy OLB; 59 Tahir Whitehead; Defensive backs (DB): 42 Isa Abdul-Quddus SS; 26 Don Carey FS; 32 James Ihedigbo SS; 31 Rashean Mathis CB; 27 Glover Quin FS; 39 Mohammed Seisay CB; 23 Darius Slay CB; 24 Josh Thomas CB; 29 Cassius Vaughn CB; Special teams (ST): 6 Sam Martin P; 48 Don Muhlbach LS; 5 Matt Prater K	Practice squad: 18 Skye Dawson WR; 41 Jerrell Harris LB; 44 Emil Igwenagu FB; 47 Nate Ness S; 1 Andrew Peacock WR; 62 Roy Philon DT; 69 Xavier Proctor DT (IR); 82 Jordan Thompson TE; 46 Trevin Wade CB; 73 Michael Williams T; Reserve: 28 Bill Bentley CB (IR); 80 Joseph Fauria TE (IR); 78 Corey Hilliard T (IR); 13 T. J. Jones WR (PUP); 43 Nevin Lawson CB (IR); 50 Travis Lewis LB (IR); 51 Dominic Raiola C (Susp.); 55 Stephen Tulloch LB (IR); 66 LaAdrian Waddle T (IR); Rookies in italics 53 active, 9 reserve, 9 practice squad

== Staff ==
2014 Detroit Lions staff
Front office: Owner/chairman – Martha Firestone Ford; Vice chairman – William Clay Ford Jr.; President – Tom Lewand; Executive vice president of football operations/general manager – Martin Mayhew; Senior personnel executive – Brian Xanders; Senior personnel executive – James Harris; Vice president of football operations – Cedric Saunders; Vice president of pro personnel – Sheldon White; Director of college scouting – Scott McEwen; Assistant director of college scouting/national scout – Lance Newmark; Assistant director of pro personnel – Charlie Sanders; Head coaches: Head coach – Jim Caldwell; Assistant head coach/tight ends – Ron Prince; Offensive coaches: Offensive coordinator – Joe Lombardi; Quarterbacks – Jim Bob Cooter; Running backs – Curtis Modkins; Wide receivers – Robert Prince; Offensive line – Jeremiah Washburn; Assistant offensive line – Bobby Johnson; Offensive assistant/quality control – Terry Heffernan	Defensive coaches: Defensive coordinator – Teryl Austin; Defensive line – Kris Kocurek; Assistant defensive line – Jim Washburn; Linebackers – Bill Sheridan; Defensive backs – Alan Williams; Assistant defensive backs – Tony Oden; Senior coaching assistant – Gunther Cunningham; Defensive quality control – Matt Raich; Special teams coaches: Special teams coordinator – John Bonamego; Assistant special teams – Devin Fitzsimmons; Strength and conditioning: Coordinator of physical development – Jason Arapoff; Assistant strength and conditioning – Ted Rath

== Preseason ==
=== Schedule ===
Week	Date	Opponent	Result	Record	Venue	Recap
1	August 9	Cleveland Browns	W 13–12	1–0	Ford Field	Recap
2	August 15	at Oakland Raiders	L 26–27	1–1	O.co Coliseum	Recap
3	August 22	Jacksonville Jaguars	W 13–12	2–1	Ford Field	Recap
4	August 28	at Buffalo Bills	W 23–0	3–1	Ralph Wilson Stadium	Recap

== Regular season ==
=== Schedule ===
Week	Date	Opponent	Result	Record	Venue	Recap
1	September 8	New York Giants	**W** 35–14	1–0	Ford Field	Recap
2	September 14	at Carolina Panthers	**L** 7–24	1–1	Bank of America Stadium	Recap
3	September 21	**Green Bay Packers**	**W** 19–7	2–1	Ford Field	Recap
4	September 28	at New York Jets	**W** 24–17	3–1	MetLife Stadium	Recap
5	October 5	Buffalo Bills	**L** 14–17	3–2	Ford Field	Recap
6	October 12	at **Minnesota Vikings**	**W** 17–3	4–2	TCF Bank Stadium	Recap
7	October 19	New Orleans Saints	**W** 24–23	5–2	Ford Field	Recap
8	October 26	at Atlanta Falcons	**W** 22–21	6–2	(United Kingdom) Wembley Stadium (London)	Recap
9	Bye					
10	November 9	Miami Dolphins	**W** 20–16	7–2	Ford Field	Recap
11	November 16	at Arizona Cardinals	**L** 6–14	7–3	University of Phoenix Stadium	Recap
12	November 23	at New England Patriots	**L** 9–34	7–4	Gillette Stadium	Recap
13	November 27	**Chicago Bears**	**W** 34–17	8–4	Ford Field	Recap
14	December 7	Tampa Bay Buccaneers	**W** 34–17	9–4	Ford Field	Recap
15	December 14	**Minnesota Vikings**	**W** 16–14	10–4	Ford Field	Recap
16	December 21	at **Chicago Bears**	**W** 20–14	11–4	Soldier Field	Recap
17	December 28	at **Green Bay Packers**	**L** 20–30	11–5	Lambeau Field	Recap

Note: Intra-division opponents are in bold.

=== Game summaries ===
==== Week 1: vs. New York Giants ====
Week 1: New York Giants at Detroit Lions – Game summary

Quarter	1	2	3	4	Total
Giants	0	7	0	7	**14**
**Lions**	14	0	13	8	**35**

at Ford Field, Detroit, Michigan

- Date: September 8
- Game time: 7:10 p.m. EDT
- Game weather: None (indoor stadium)
- Game attendance: 64,401
- Referee: Clete Blakeman
- TV announcers (ESPN): Mike Tirico, Jon Gruden and Lisa Salters
- Recap, Game Book

Game information

**First quarter**

- DET – Calvin Johnson 67-yard pass from Matthew Stafford (Nate Freese kick), 12:11. Lions 7–0. **Drive: 4 plays, 80 yards, 2:49.**
- DET – Calvin Johnson 16-yard pass from Matthew Stafford (Nate Freese kick), 5:12. Lions 14–0. **Drive: 9 plays, 69 yards, 5:23.**

**Second quarter**

- NYG – Larry Donnell 1-yard pass from Eli Manning (Josh Brown kick), 12:54. Lions 14–7. **Drive: 13 plays, 79 yards, 4:56.**

**Third quarter**

- DET – Nate Freese 28-yard field goal, 11:54. Lions 17–7. **Drive: 4 plays, 8 yards, 1:37.**
- DET – Nate Freese 27-yard field goal, 5:50. Lions 20–7. **Drive: 9 plays, 66 yards, 4:02.**
- DET – Matthew Stafford 5-yard run (Nate Freese kick), 3:51. Lions 27–7. **Drive: 5 plays, 19 yards, 1:41.**

**Fourth quarter**

- NYG – Rashad Jennings 1-yard run (Josh Brown kick), 11:53. Lions 27–14. **Drive: 14 plays, 80 yards, 6:58.**
- DET – Joique Bell 3-yard run (Matthew Stafford–Joseph Fauria pass), 4:39. Lions 35–14. **Drive: 12 plays, 80 yards, 7:14.**

**Top passers**

- NYG – Eli Manning – 18/33, 163 yards, TD, 2 INT
- DET – Matthew Stafford – 22/32, 346 yards, 2 TD

**Top rushers**

- NYG – Rashad Jennings – 16 rushes, 46 yards, TD
- DET – Joique Bell – 15 rushes, 51 yards, TD

**Top receivers**

- NYG – Larry Donnell – 5 receptions, 56 yards, TD
- DET – Calvin Johnson – 7 receptions, 164 yards, 2 TD

The Lions hosted their first opening-day Monday Night Football game since 1971, rudely welcoming the New York Giants to town. Matthew Stafford connected with Calvin Johnson on TD passes of 67 and 16 yards in the first quarter, giving Detroit an early 14–0 lead. The Giants got on the board in the second quarter with a 1-yard TD pass from Eli Manning to Larry Donnell, closing the gap to 14–7. Rookie kicker Nate Freese connected on field goals of 28 and 27 yards in the third quarter to extend the Lions lead to 20–7. An interception by Glover Quin, Detroit's second pick of the game, set up the Lions next touchdown, a 5-yard run by Stafford. New York narrowed the lead to 27–14 early in the fourth quarter when Rashad Jennings plunged in from a yard out, but that was as close as the Giants would get. Joique Bell capped the scoring with a 3-yard TD run, and the ensuing two-point conversion made the final score 35–14.

==== Week 2: at Carolina Panthers ====
Week 2: Detroit Lions at Carolina Panthers – Game summary

Quarter	1	2	3	4	Total
Lions	0	0	7	0	**7**
**Panthers**	0	6	7	11	**24**

at Bank of America Stadium, Charlotte, North Carolina

- Date: September 14
- Game time: 1:00 p.m. EDT
- Game weather: Cloudy, 70 °F (21 °C)
- Game attendance: 73,586
- Referee: Jerome Boger
- TV announcers (Fox): Chris Myers, Ronde Barber and Jennifer Hale
- Recap, Game Book

Game information

**First quarter**

- No scoring plays.

**Second quarter**

- CAR – Graham Gano 29-yard field goal, 7:58. Panthers 3–0. **Drive: 14 plays, 77 yards, 6:04.**
- CAR – Graham Gano 53-yard field goal, 1:11. Panthers 6–0. **Drive: 6 plays, 26 yards, 2:06.**

**Third quarter**

- DET – Jed Collins 1-yard pass from Matthew Stafford (Nate Freese kick), 9:28. Lions 7–6. **Drive: 8 plays, 63 yards, 4:01.**
- CAR – Jason Avant 14-yard pass from Cam Newton (Graham Gano kick), 2:30. Panthers 13–7. **Drive: 8 plays, 72 yards, 3:21.**

**Fourth quarter**

- CAR – Jonathan Stewart 2-yard run (Cam Newton–Jerricho Cotchery pass), 7:26. Panthers 21–7. **Drive: 9 plays, 70 yards, 4:53.**
- CAR – Graham Gano 38-yard field goal, 4:45. Panthers 24–7. **Drive: 4 plays, 13 yards, 2:31.**

**Top passers**

- DET – Matthew Stafford – 27/48, 291 yards, TD, INT
- CAR – Cam Newton – 22/34, 281 yards, TD

**Top rushers**

- DET – Joique Bell – 10 rushes, 36 yards
- CAR – Jonathan Stewart – 15 rushes, 37 yards, TD

**Top receivers**

- DET – Calvin Johnson – 6 receptions, 83 yards
- CAR – Greg Olsen – 6 receptions, 72 yards

Carolina's Cam Newton made a successful comeback from a rib injury that kept him out of action in Week 1, but the story of the day was the Panthers' defense. Carolina forced three Detroit turnovers, two of which led to scores. Graham Gano opened the scoring for Carolina in the second quarter with field goals of 29 and 53 yards. The Lions took a 7–6 lead in the third quarter when Matthew Stafford hit fullback Jed Collins with a 1-yard TD pass. But the rest of the game was all Carolina. Newton closed the third with a 14-yard TD pass to Jason Avant to retake the lead, 13–7. In the fourth quarter, Jonathan Stewart found the end zone on a 2-yard TD run, with the ensuing two-point conversion giving the Panthers a 21–7 lead. Gano finished the scoring with a 38-yard field goal.

==== Week 3: vs. Green Bay Packers ====
Week 3: Green Bay Packers at Detroit Lions – Game summary

Quarter	1	2	3	4	Total
Packers	7	0	0	0	**7**
**Lions**	7	5	0	7	**19**

at Ford Field, Detroit, Michigan

- Date: September 21
- Game time: 1:00 p.m. EDT
- Game weather: None (indoor stadium)
- Game attendance: 62,418
- Referee: Carl Cheffers
- TV announcers (Fox): Kevin Burkhardt, John Lynch and Pam Oliver
- Recap, Game Book

Game information

**First quarter**

- DET – Don Carey 40-yard fumble return (Nate Freese kick), 12:02. Lions 7–0.
- GB – Andrew Quarless 10-yard pass from Aaron Rodgers (Mason Crosby kick), 0:39. Tied 7–7. **Drive: 9 plays, 59 yards, 3:07.**

**Second quarter**

- DET – Eddie Lacy tackled in the end zone by DeAndre Levy for a safety, 13:21. Lions 9–7.
- DET – Nate Freese 30-yard field goal, 6:16. Lions 12–7. **Drive: 13 plays, 43 yards, 7:05.**

**Third quarter**

- No scoring plays.

**Fourth quarter**

- DET – Reggie Bush 26-yard run (Nate Freese kick), 10:40. Lions 19–7. **Drive: 10 plays, 75 yards, 5:53.**

**Top passers**

- GB – Aaron Rodgers – 16/27, 162 yards, TD
- DET – Matthew Stafford – 22/34, 246 yards, 2 INT

**Top rushers**

- GB – James Starks – 8 rushes, 38 yards
- DET – Reggie Bush – 12 rushes, 61 yards, TD

**Top receivers**

- GB – Jordy Nelson – 5 receptions, 59 yards
- DET – Calvin Johnson – 6 receptions, 82 yards

The Lions faced division rival Green Bay in Week 3, with Packers QB Aaron Rodgers sporting a 9–1 record in his last 10 games against Detroit. The first two scoring plays for the Lions came courtesy of the defense. Nick Fairley forced a fumble that was scooped up by defensive back Don Carey and returned 40 yards for a touchdown to put the Lions up 7–0. After Rodgers tied the game with a 10-yard TD pass to Andrew Quarless, DeAndre Levy tackled running back Eddie Lacy in the end zone for a safety, making the score 9–7. Nate Freese closed the first half scoring with a 30-yard field goal, sending Detroit to the locker room with a 12–7 lead. The only scoring drive of the second half culminated with a Reggie Bush 26-yard TD run, to put Detroit up 19–7. The Lions defense held Green Bay scoreless for the final three quarters of the game.

==== Week 4: at New York Jets ====
Week 4: Detroit Lions at New York Jets – Game summary

Quarter	1	2	3	4	Total
**Lions**	3	14	0	7	**24**
Jets	3	0	7	7	**17**

at MetLife Stadium, East Rutherford, New Jersey

- Date: September 28
- Game time: 1:00 p.m. EDT
- Game weather: Clear, 80 °F (27 °C)
- Game attendance: 78,160
- Referee: Walt Coleman
- TV announcers (Fox): Kenny Albert, Daryl Johnston and Tony Siragusa
- Recap, Game Book

Game information

**First quarter**

- NYJ – Nick Folk 27-yard field goal, 8:36. Jets 3–0. **Drive: 14 plays, 71 yards, 6:24.**
- DET – Alex Henery 51-yard field goal, 5:04. Tied 3–3. **Drive: 7 plays, 47 yards, 3:32.**

**Second quarter**

- DET – Jeremy Ross 59-yard pass from Matthew Stafford (Alex Henery kick), 6:19. Lions 10–3. **Drive: 5 plays, 83 yards, 2:59.**
- DET – Eric Ebron 16-yard pass from Matthew Stafford (Alex Henery kick), 0:22. Lions 17–3. **Drive: 5 plays, 47 yards, 0:46.**

**Third quarter**

- NYJ – Eric Decker 11-yard pass from Geno Smith (Nick Folk kick), 7:26. Lions 17–10. **Drive: 11 plays, 74 yards, 4:39.**

**Fourth quarter**

- DET – Matthew Stafford 1-yard run (Alex Henery kick), 14:54. Lions 24–10. **Drive: 14 plays, 90 yards, 7:32.**
- NYJ – Chris Johnson 35-yard run (Nick Folk kick), 6:58. Lions 24–17. **Drive: 7 plays, 75 yards, 2:27.**

**Top passers**

- DET – Matthew Stafford – 24/34, 293 yards, 2 TD
- NYJ – Geno Smith – 17/33, 209 yards, TD, INT

**Top rushers**

- DET – Reggie Bush – 12 rushes, 46 yards
- NYJ – Chris Ivory – 17 rushes, 84 yards

**Top receivers**

- DET – Golden Tate – 8 receptions, 116 yards
- NYJ – Greg Salas – 2 receptions, 60 yards

After opening the season 3-for-7 on field goal attempts, Detroit kicker Nate Freese was cut during the week and was replaced by Alex Henery. Henery made good on his first field goal attempt for his new team, a 51-yarder to tie the Jets at 3–3 in the first quarter. The Lions put together two TD drives in the second quarter to go up 17–3. First, Matthew Stafford hit Jeremy Ross on a 59-yard bomb. Stafford then connected with first-round draft pick Eric Ebron for a 16-yard TD, giving Ebron his first NFL touchdown. Jets QB Geno Smith hit Eric Decker with an 11-yard TD pass to close the gap to 17–10. Early in the fourth, Stafford found the right pylon for a 1-yard TD run, making the score 24–10. Chris Johnson rumbled 35 yards for a touchdown midway through the final quarter, pulling the Jets within a touchdown again, at 24–17. Detroit's defense was able to force a punt on New York's final possession and the Lions ran out the clock thereafter.

==== Week 5: vs. Buffalo Bills ====
Week 5: Buffalo Bills at Detroit Lions – Game summary

Quarter	1	2	3	4	Total
**Bills**	0	3	3	11	**17**
Lions	7	7	0	0	**14**

at Ford Field, Detroit, Michigan

- Date: October 5
- Game time: 1:00 p.m. EDT
- Game weather: None (indoor stadium)
- Game attendance: 62,775
- Referee: Craig Wrolstad
- TV announcers (Fox): Sam Rosen, Ronde Barber and Jennifer Hale
- Recap, Game Book

Game information

**First quarter**

- DET – Golden Tate 9-yard pass from Matthew Stafford (Alex Henery kick), 0:05. Lions 7–0. **Drive: 7 plays, 57 yards, 3:38.**

**Second quarter**

- DET – Rashean Mathis 41-yard interception return (Alex Henery kick), 13:44. Lions 14–0.
- BUF – Dan Carpenter 45-yard field goal, 6:43. Lions 14–3. **Drive: 6 plays, 24 yards, 3:38.**

**Third quarter**

- BUF – Dan Carpenter 25-yard field goal, 1:23. Lions 14–6. **Drive: 9 plays, 56 yards, 3:42.**

**Fourth quarter**

- BUF – Chris Gragg 2-yard pass from Kyle Orton (Fred Jackson run), 9:23. Tied 14–14. **Drive: 9 plays, 74 yards, 3:56.**
- BUF – Dan Carpenter 58-yard field goal, 0:04. Bills 17–14. **Drive: 3 plays, 20 yards, 0:17.**

**Top passers**

- BUF – Kyle Orton – 30/43, 308 yards, TD, INT
- DET – Matthew Staford – 18/31, 231 yards, TD, INT

**Top rushers**

- BUF – Fred Jackson – 10 rushes, 49 yards
- DET – George Winn – 11 rushes, 48 yards

**Top receivers**

- BUF – Sammy Watkins – 7 receptions, 87 yards
- DET – Golden Tate – 7 receptions, 134 yards

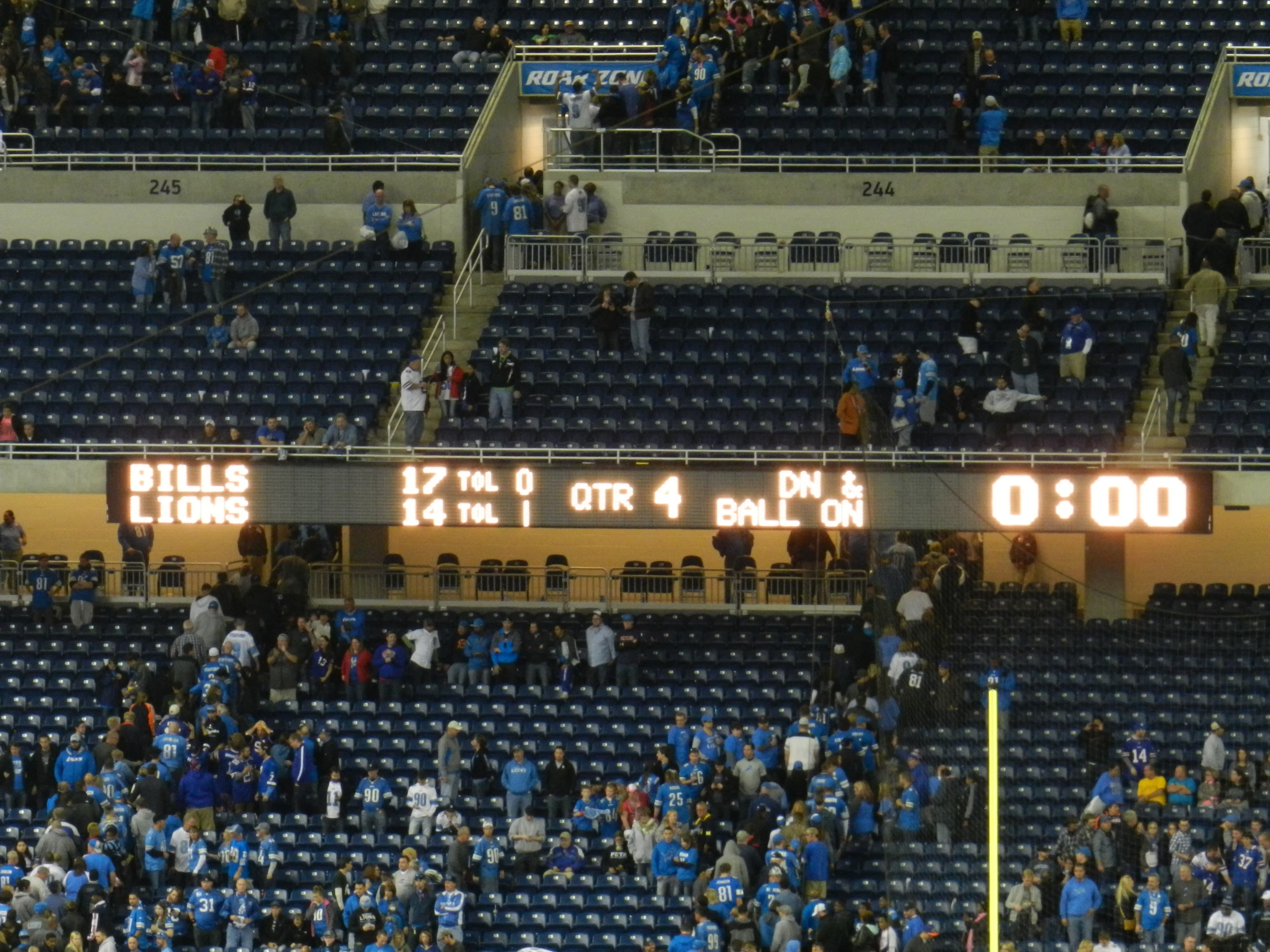
Scoreboard showing the final score

The Lions took a 14–0 lead by early in the second quarter, following a 9-yard touchdown reception by Golden Tate and a 41-yard interception return by Rashean Mathis. But that would end Detroit's scoring for the day. Buffalo came back on field goals of 45 and 25 yards by Dan Carpenter, making the score 14–6 by the start of the fourth quarter. Kyle Orton hit Chris Gragg with a 2-yard TD pass and the ensuing two-point conversion tied the score at 14–14. With 26 seconds left in the game, Alex Henery missed a 50-yard field goal attempt, his third miss of the day. The Bills quickly moved the ball to the Lions' 40-yard line, setting up Carpenter's game-winning 58-yard field goal with 4 seconds remaining.

==== Week 6: at Minnesota Vikings ====
Week 6: Detroit Lions at Minnesota Vikings – Game summary

Quarter	1	2	3	4	Total
**Lions**	7	3	0	7	**17**
Vikings	0	0	0	3	**3**

at TCF Bank Stadium, Minneapolis, Minnesota

- Date: October 12
- Game time: 1:00 p.m. EDT/12:00 p.m. CDT
- Game weather: Sunny, 53 °F (12 °C)
- Game attendance: 52,213
- Referee: John Parry
- TV announcers (Fox): Mike Goldberg, Brendon Ayanbadejo and Peter Schrager
- Recap, Game Book

Game information

**First quarter**

- DET – Theo Riddick 9-yard pass from Matthew Stafford (Matt Prater kick), 11:06. Lions 7–0. **Drive: 7 plays, 80 yards, 3:54.**

**Second quarter**

- DET – Matt Prater 52-yard field goal, 0:07. Lions 10–0. **Drive: 5 plays, 17 yards, 0:38.**

**Third quarter**

- No scoring plays.

**Fourth quarter**

- DET – Joique Bell 1-yard run (Matt Prater kick), 11:44. Lions 17–0. **Drive: 14 plays, 60 yards, 7:54.**
- MIN – Blair Walsh 40-yard field goal, 4:53. Lions 17–3. **Drive: 11 plays, 45 yards, 4:21.**

**Top passers**

- DET – Matthew Stafford – 19/33, 185 yards, TD
- MIN – Teddy Bridgewater – 23/37, 188 yards, 3 INT

**Top rushers**

- DET – Joique Bell – 18 rushes, 74 yards, TD
- MIN – Jerick McKinnon – 11 rushes, 40 yards

**Top receivers**

- DET – Theo Riddick – 5 receptions, 75 yards, TD
- MIN – Jerick McKinnon – 6 receptions, 42 yards

On a day when offensive stars Calvin Johnson and Reggie Bush could not play due to injuries, the Lions defense had to step up and it did in a big way. Detroit sacked Vikings rookie quarterback Teddy Bridgewater eight times, harassed him into throwing three interceptions and held the Vikings scoreless until late in the fourth quarter. The Lions got on the board in the first quarter with a 9-yard TD pass from Matthew Stafford to Theo Riddick. Matt Prater, acquired during the week to replace the struggling Alex Henery, made good on a 52-yard field goal near the end of the first half to give the Lions a 10–0 lead. After a scoreless third quarter, Detroit upped its lead to 17–0 on a 1-yard TD plunge by Joique Bell. Blair Walsh got the Vikings on the board with a 40-yard field goal, making the final score 17–3.

This game would receive attention due to it being the only NFL on FOX game ever broadcast by UFC announcer Mike Goldberg, whose commentating style received overwhelmingly negative reception by fans and viewers alike. Goldberg was not retained after the game.

==== Week 7: vs. New Orleans Saints ====
Week 7: New Orleans Saints at Detroit Lions – Game summary

Quarter	1	2	3	4	Total
Saints	0	10	7	6	**23**
**Lions**	0	3	7	14	**24**

at Ford Field, Detroit, Michigan

- Date: October 19
- Game time: 1:00 p.m. EDT
- Game weather: None (indoor stadium)
- Game attendance: 63,271
- Referee: Terry McAulay
- TV announcers (Fox): Chris Myers, Ronde Barber and Jennifer Hale
- Recap, Game Book

Game information

**First quarter**

- No scoring plays.

**Second quarter**

- NO – Austin Johnson 14-yard pass from Drew Brees (Shayne Graham kick), 13:56. Saints 7–0. **Drive: 4 plays, 29 yards, 1:16.**
- DET – Matt Prater 21-yard field goal, 5:29. Saints 7–3. **Drive: 6 plays, 44 yards, 2:18.**
- NO – Shayne Graham 27-yard field goal, 0:00. Saints 10–3. **Drive: 8 plays, 80 yards, 1:32.**

**Third quarter**

- NO – Kenny Stills 46-yard pass from Drew Brees (Shayne Graham kick), 13:42. Saints 17–3. **Drive: 4 plays, 80 yards, 1:18.**
- DET – Joique Bell 1-yard run (Matt Prater kick), 6:19. Saints 17–10. **Drive: 12 plays, 80 yards, 7:23.**

**Fourth quarter**

- NO – Shayne Graham 48-yard field goal, 13:33. Saints 20–10. **Drive: 11 plays, 69 yards, 5:03.**
- NO – Shayne Graham 36-yard field goal, 5:24. Saints 23–10. **Drive: 6 plays, 31 yards, 3:19.**
- DET – Golden Tate 73-yard pass from Matthew Stafford (Matt Prater kick), 3:38. Saints 23–17. **Drive: 6 plays, 90 yards, 1:46.**
- DET – Corey Fuller 5-yard pass from Matthew Stafford (Matt Prater kick), 1:48. Lions 24–23. **Drive: 6 plays, 14 yards, 1:22.**

**Top passers**

- NO – Drew Brees – 28/45, 342 yards, 2 TD, INT
- DET – Matthew Stafford – 27/40, 299 yards, 2 TD, 2 INT

**Top rushers**

- NO – Khiry Robinson – 3 rushes, 26 yards
- DET – Joique Bell – 18 rushes, 48 yards, TD

**Top receivers**

- NO – Marques Colston – 6 receptions, 111 yards
- DET – Golden Tate – 10 receptions, 154 yards, TD

Playing again without Calvin Johnson, the Lions fell behind the visiting New Orleans Saints by two scores on two separate occasions, before mounting a dramatic comeback in the final minutes of the game. New Orleans had three of the first four scoring plays of the game. Drew Brees hit Austin Johnson with a 14-yard TD pass, Shayne Graham made good on a 27-yard field goal and Kenny Stills caught a 46-yard TD pass from Brees. Meanwhile, the Lions could only muster a 21-yard field goal by Matt Prater, falling behind 17–3. Detroit closed the gap to 17–10 in the third quarter after a 1-yard TD run by Joique Bell. Two more Shayne Graham field goals, however, gave the Saints a seemingly comfortable 23–10 lead with 5:24 to play in the game. With under four minutes to play, Matthew Stafford connected with Golden Tate on a 73-yard catch-and-run, making the score 23–17. On the Saints' next possession, Glover Quin picked off a third-and-ten Drew Brees pass, returning it to the New Orleans 14-yard line. At the 1:48 mark, Corey Fuller made a leaping catch of a 5-yard TD pass from Stafford for the winning touchdown in a 24–23 game. The Lions' defense held off the Saints in four downs, then the offense ran out the clock for the win.

==== Week 8: at Atlanta Falcons ====
Week 8: Detroit Lions at Atlanta Falcons – Game summary

Quarter	1	2	3	4	Total
**Lions**	0	0	10	12	**22**
Falcons	14	7	0	0	**21**

at Wembley Stadium, London, England

- Date: October 26
- Game time: 1:30 p.m. GMT/9:30 a.m. EDT
- Game weather: Overcast, 59 °F (15 °C)
- Game attendance: 83,532
- Referee: Pete Morelli
- TV announcers (Fox): Thom Brennaman, Troy Aikman and Charissa Thompson
- Recap, Game Book

Game information

**First quarter**

- ATL – Devonta Freeman 7-yard pass from Matt Ryan (Matt Bryant kick), 9:25. Falcons 7–0. **Drive: 10 plays, 80 yards, 5:35.**
- ATL – Bear Pascoe 1-yard pass from Matt Ryan (Matt Bryant kick), 2:53. Falcons 14–0. **Drive: 6 plays, 56 yards, 3:26.**

**Second quarter**

- ATL – Steven Jackson 1-yard run (Matt Bryant kick), 3:45. Falcons 21–0. **Drive: 12 plays, 89 yards, 6:17.**

**Third quarter**

- DET – Matt Prater 22-yard field goal, 7:54. Falcons 21–3. **Drive: 15 plays, 76 yards, 7:06.**
- DET – Golden Tate 59-yard pass from Matthew Stafford (Matt Prater kick), 4:38. Falcons 21–10. **Drive: 3 plays, 44 yards, 1:44.**

**Fourth quarter**

- DET – Matt Prater 20-yard field goal, 14:10. Falcons 21–13. **Drive: 4 plays, 5 yards, 1:00.**
- DET – Theo Riddick 5-yard pass from Matt Stafford (pass failed), 3:56. Falcons 21–19. **Drive: 13 plays, 69 yards, 7:29.**
- DET – Matt Prater 48-yard field goal, 0:00. Lions 22–21. **Drive: 11 plays, 63 yards, 1:38.**

**Top passers**

- DET – Matthew Stafford – 24/47, 325 yards, 2 TD, INT
- ATL – Matt Ryan – 20/27, 228 yards, 2 TD, INT

**Top rushers**

- DET – Joique Bell – 14 rushes, 39 yards
- ATL – Steven Jackson – 18 rushes, 60 yards

**Top receivers**

- DET – Golden Tate – 7 receptions, 151 yards, TD
- ATL – Roddy White – 5 receptions, 66 yards

In week 8, the Lions flew to London, England to play in the NFL International Series against the Atlanta Falcons at Wembley Stadium. The game was played at 9:30 AM EDT, the first ever NFL game in that time slot. Like the previous game, the Lions were trailing by a large margin (down 21–0 at halftime) before mounting a huge comeback, scoring 22 unanswered points in the second half to win by a single point in the final minutes. The Falcons had touchdown catches of 7 and 1 yards respectively by Devonta Freeman and Bear Pascoe in the first quarter, then a 1-yard run by Steven Jackson in the second quarter. After halftime, a 22-yard Matt Prater field goal and a 59-yard TD pass from Matthew Stafford to Golden Tate narrowed the score to 21–10 by the end of the third quarter. Detroit got the ball on the Atlanta 8-yard line early in the fourth quarter after a Cassius Vaughn interception and return, settling for a 20-yard Prater field goal. A 5-yard touchdown reception by Theo Riddick made the score 21–19, but the Lions failed to convert a two-point attempt. The Falcons had the ball in Lions territory with under two minutes to play, but a holding penalty and a dropped pass both stopped the clock, forcing Atlanta to punt. With no time outs remaining and 1:38 on the clock, Detroit drove from its own 6-yard line to the Atlanta 25 with four seconds remaining in the game. Prater missed a 43-yard field goal attempt, but the whistle had blown before the snap because of a Detroit delay-of-game penalty. Prater then nailed a 48-yarder as time expired for the win.

Calvin Johnson, still recovering from an ankle injury, missed a third straight game for the Lions, who also played without Reggie Bush and their top three tight ends (Eric Ebron, Brandon Pettigrew and Joseph Fauria). Matthew Stafford's two touchdown passes gave him a team-record 120 in his career, breaking the tie he held with Bobby Layne at 118. The Falcons blew a halftime lead of 21 points or more for the first time in team history. The Lions entered their bye week atop the NFC North with a 6–2 record.

==== Week 10: vs. Miami Dolphins ====
Week 10: Miami Dolphins at Detroit Lions – Game summary

Quarter	1	2	3	4	Total
Dolphins	0	3	10	3	**16**
**Lions**	10	0	0	10	**20**

at Ford Field, Detroit, Michigan

- Date: November 9
- Game time: 1:00 p.m. EST
- Game weather: None (indoor stadium)
- Game attendance: 63,179
- Referee: Bill Leavy
- TV announcers (CBS): Ian Eagle, Dan Fouts and Jenny Dell
- Recap, Game Book

Game information

**First quarter**

- DET – Matt Prater 26-yard field goal, 6:19. Lions 3–0. **Drive: 15 plays, 72 yards, 8:41.**
- DET – Calvin Johnson 49-yard pass from Matthew Stafford (Matt Prater kick), 3:58. Lions 10–0. **Drive: 1 play, 49 yards, 0:08.**

**Second quarter**

- MIA – Caleb Sturgis 23-yard field goal, 0:13. Lions 10–3. **Drive: 14 plays, 75 yards, 5:09.**

**Third quarter**

- MIA – Caleb Sturgis 50-yard field goal, 8:24. Lions 10–6. **Drive: 7 plays, 25 yards, 2:52.**
- MIA – Mike Wallace 3-yard pass from Ryan Tannehill (Caleb Sturgis kick), 1:17. Dolphins 13–10. **Drive: 1 play, 3 yards, 0:05.**

**Fourth quarter**

- DET – Matt Prater 50-yard field goal, 12:02. Tied 13–13. **Drive: 8 plays, 50 yards, 4:15.**
- MIA – Caleb Sturgis 20-yard field goal, 4:19. Dolphins 16–13. **Drive: 13 plays, 70 yards, 7:43.**
- DET – Theo Riddick 11-yard pass from Matthew Stafford (Matt Prater kick), 0:29. Lions 20–16. **Drive: 11 plays, 74 yards, 2:44.**

**Top passers**

- MIA – Ryan Tannehill – 27/38, 201 yards, TD, INT
- DET – Matthew Stafford – 25/40, 280 yards, 2 TD, INT

**Top rushers**

- MIA – Damien Williams – 7 rushes, 39 yards
- DET – Joique Bell – 10 rushes, 44 yards

**Top receivers**

- MIA – Jarvis Landry – 7 receptions, 53 yards
- DET – Calvin Johnson – 7 receptions, 113 yards

Week 10 featured the top-ranked defenses (by yardage against) in each conference, as the Lions hosted the Dolphins. Detroit got off to a quick start. Matt Prater kicked a 26-yard field goal on the opening drive of the game. Later in the first quarter, Calvin Johnson, playing in his first game since Week 5, caught a 49-yard TD pass from Matthew Stafford for a 10–0 lead. Miami managed a 23-yard Caleb Sturgis field goal before halftime, making the score 10–3. The Dolphins took the lead in the third, starting with a 50-yard Stugis field goal. Next, Earl Mitchell blocked Prater's 42-yard field goal attempt and Dion Jordan returned the ball to the Lions' 3-yard line. On the next play, Ryan Tannehill connected with Mike Wallace for the touchdown, putting Miami ahead, 13–10. Prater made good on a 50-yard field goal early in the fourth quarter to knot the score at 13–13, but Sturgis' 20-yarder put Miami back on top by 3. As in the previous two games, the Lions had to rally on their final drive to win the game. Starting at their own 26 with 3:13 left in the game, the drive culminated with Stafford's 11-yard touchdown pass to Theo Riddick, putting the Lions ahead for good, 20–16.

This was the third straight game in which the Lions trailed at the two-minute warning, then went ahead on their final drive. It was the second time in a month that Miami had lost a game in the final seconds, following a Week 7 loss to Green Bay in which the final touchdown was scored with 3 seconds remaining. According to STATS Inc., this is the first time Detroit has started a season 7–2 since 1993.

==== Week 11: at Arizona Cardinals ====
Week 11: Detroit Lions at Arizona Cardinals – Game summary

Quarter	1	2	3	4	Total
Lions	3	3	0	0	**6**
**Cardinals**	14	0	0	0	**14**

at University of Phoenix Stadium, Glendale, Arizona

- Date: November 16
- Game time: 4:25 p.m. EST/2:25 p.m. MST
- Game weather: None (retractable roof closed)
- Game attendance: 62,487
- Referee: Jerome Boger
- TV announcers (Fox): Chris Myers, Ronde Barber and Jennifer Hale
- Recap, Game Book

Game information

**First quarter**

- ARI – Michael Floyd 42-yard pass from Drew Stanton (Chandler Catanzaro kick), 12:02. Cardinals 7–0. **Drive: 6 plays, 80 yards, 2:58.**
- ARI – Michael Floyd 12-yard pass from Drew Stanton (Chandler Catanzaro kick), 6:06. Cardinals 14–0. **Drive: 7 plays, 77 yards, 3:42.**
- DET – Matt Prater 50-yard field goal, 2:46. Cardinals 14–3. **Drive: 6 plays, 48 yards, 3:20.**

**Second quarter**

- DET – Matt Prater 28-yard field goal, 0:25. Cardinals 14–6. **Drive: 4 plays, 9 yards, 1:27.**

**Third quarter**

- No scoring plays.

**Fourth quarter**

- No scoring plays.

**Top passers**

- DET – Matthew Stafford – 18/30, 183 yards, INT
- ARI – Drew Stanton – 21/32, 2 TD, 2 INT

**Top rushers**

- DET – Joique Bell – 14 rushes, 85 yards
- ARI – Andre Ellington – 19 rushes, 42 yards

**Top receivers**

- DET – Calvin Johnson – 5 receptions, 59 yards
- ARI – John Brown – 5 receptions, 69 yards

In week 11, the 7–2, NFC North-leading Lions flew to Phoenix to face the NFC West's first place team, the 8–1 Arizona Cardinals. In the first quarter, the Cardinals picked up two touchdowns to open the game. Michael Floyd caught a pair of touchdown passes from Drew Stanton, from 42 yards and 12 yards out, giving them an early lead they never relinquished. Detroit's Matt Prater hit a pair of field goals, first a 50-yard kick in the first quarter then a 28-yarder late in the second quarter, to cut the lead to 14–6 at halftime. Neither team scored in the second half. The Lions, plagued by several penalties on both sides of the ball, saw their four-game winning streak snapped.

==== Week 12: at New England Patriots ====
Week 12: Detroit Lions at New England Patriots – Game summary

Quarter	1	2	3	4	Total
Lions	3	3	0	3	**9**
**Patriots**	7	17	3	7	**34**

at Gillette Stadium, Foxborough, Massachusetts

- Date: November 23
- Game time: 1:00 p.m. EST
- Game weather: Mostly sunny, 58 °F (14 °C)
- Game attendance: 68,756
- Referee: Tony Corrente
- TV announcers (Fox): Joe Buck, Troy Aikman and Erin Andrews
- Recap, Game Book

Game information

**First quarter**

- DET – Matt Prater 48-yard field goal, 11:44. Lions 3–0. **Drive: 8 plays, 50 yards, 3:16.**
- NE – Tim Wright 4-yard pass from Tom Brady (Stephen Gostkowski kick), 3:10. Patriots 7–3. **Drive: 9 plays, 64 yards, 2:37.**

**Second quarter**

- DET – Matt Prater 20-yard field goal, 13:37. Patriots 7–6. **Drive: 10 plays, 78 yards, 4:33.**
- NE – LeGarrette Blount 3-yard run (Stephen Gostkowski kick), 12:43. Patriots 14–6. **Drive: 2 plays, 22 yards, 0:54.**
- NE – Tim Wright 8-yard pass from Tom Brady (Stephen Gostkowski kick), 2:42. Patriots 21–6. **Drive: 13 plays, 93 yards, 5:03.**
- NE – Stephen Gostkowski 35-yard field goal, 0:00. Patriots 24–6. **Drive: 4 plays, 40 yards, 0:35.**

**Third quarter**

- NE – Stephen Gostkowski 43-yard field goal, 5:05. Patriots 27–6. **Drive: 9 plays, 50 yards, 3:27.**

**Fourth quarter**

- DET – Matt Prater 49-yard field goal, 14:48. Patriots 27–9. **Drive: 10 plays, 34 yards, 3:06.**
- NE – LeGarrette Blount 1-yard run (Stephen Gostkowski kick), 1:53. Patriots 34–9. **Drive: 9 plays, 66 yards, 4:30.**

**Top passers**

- DET – Matthew Stafford – 18/46, 264 yards, INT
- NE – Tom Brady – 38/53, 349 yards, 2 TD, INT

**Top rushers**

- DET – Joique Bell – 19 rushes, 49 yards
- NE – LeGarrette Blount – 12 rushes, 78 yards, 2 TD

**Top receivers**

- DET – Golden Tate – 4 receptions, 97 yards
- NE – Brandon LaFell – 9 receptions, 98 yards

In week 12, the Lions flew east for another battle of division leaders, this time with the AFC East's 8–2 New England Patriots. The Lions failed to score a touchdown for the second consecutive week and fell to second place after a blowout loss. The Lions scored first when Matt Prater hit a 48-yard field goal in the first quarter. The Patriots then took the lead which they kept for the rest of the game when Tim Wright caught a 4-yard touchdown pass from Tom Brady near the end of the first quarter. The Lions responded with a 20-yard field goal in the second quarter. The Patriots then scored two touchdowns on a 3-yard run from LeGarrette Blount, then an 8-yard catch by Tim Wright. New England's Stephen Gostkowski then kicked a 35-yard field goal to make the score 24–6 at halftime. The only score of the third quarter was a Patriots 35-yard field goal. In the final quarter, the Lions scored their third field goal, this one from 49 yards out. The Patriots capped their large victory with a 1-yard touchdown run from LeGarrette Blount.

==== Week 13: vs. Chicago Bears ====
Week 13: Chicago Bears at Detroit Lions – Game summary

Quarter	1	2	3	4	Total
Bears	14	0	3	0	**17**
**Lions**	3	21	0	10	**34**

at Ford Field, Detroit, Michigan

- Date: November 27
- Game time: 12:30 p.m. EST
- Game weather: None (indoor stadium)
- Game attendance: 64,175
- Referee: Bill Vinovich
- TV announcers (CBS): Jim Nantz, Phil Simms and Tracy Wolfson
- Recap, Game Book

Game information

**First quarter**

- CHI – Alshon Jeffery 10-yard pass from Jay Cutler (Robbie Gould kick), 10:33. Bears 7–0. **Drive: 6 plays, 55 yards, 2:47.**
- DET – Matt Prater 46-yard field goal, 6:51. Bears 7–3. **Drive: 8 plays, 52 yards, 3:42.**
- CHI – Alshon Jeffery 6-yard pass from Jay Cutler (Robbie Gould kick), 3:35. Bears 14–3. **Drive: 2 plays, 5 yards, 0:43.**

**Second quarter**

- DET – Calvin Johnson 25-yard pass from Matthew Stafford (Matt Prater kick), 12:55. Bears 14–10. **Drive: 9 plays, 78 yards, 5:40.**
- DET – Joique Bell 1-yard run (Matt Prater kick), 3:18. Lions 17–14. **Drive: 10 plays, 86 yards, 4:28.**
- DET – Calvin Johnson 6-yard pass from Matthew Stafford (Matt Prater kick), 0:24. Lions 24–14. **Drive: 5 plays, 64 yards, 1:21.**

**Third quarter**

- CHI – Robbie Gould 35-yard field goal, 8:54. Lions 24–17. **Drive: 13 plays, 63 yards, 6:06.**

**Fourth quarter**

- DET – Joique Bell 1-yard run (Matt Prater kick), 14:57. Lions 31–17. **Drive: 12 plays, 95 yards, 6:01.**
- DET – Matt Prater 40-yard field goal, 6:16. Lions 34–17. **Drive: 6 plays, 20 yards, 3:13.**

**Top passers**

- CHI – Jay Cutler – 31/48, 280 yards, 2 TD, 2 INT
- DET – Matthew Stafford – 34/45, 390 yards, 2 TD

**Top rushers**

- CHI – Ka'Deem Carey – 2 rushes, 8 yards
- DET – Joique Bell – 23 rushes, 91 yards, 2 TD

**Top receivers**

- CHI – Martellus Bennett – 8 receptions, 109 yards
- DET – Calvin Johnson – 11 receptions, 146 yards, 2 TD

After a short week, the Lions hosted their division rivals the Chicago Bears for their 75th annual Thanksgiving Day Game. Detroit spotted Chicago a 14–3 first quarter lead, as Jay Cutler hit Alshon Jeffery with touchdown passes of 10 and 6 yards, wrapped around a Matt Prater 46-yard field goal. In the second quarter, Calvin Johnson ended his team's nine-quarter touchdown drought by catching a 25-yard TD pass from Matthew Stafford. Before the half ended, Joique Bell scored on a 1-yard run and Stafford again hooked up with Johnson, this time on a 6-yard TD, putting Detroit up 24–14. Robbie Gould closed the gap to seven points with a 35-yard field goal in the third quarter. Detroit scored the game's final 10 points in the fourth quarter. Joique Bell capped a 95-yard drive with his second 1-yard TD run and Matt Prater hit a 40-yard field goal, making the final score 34–17. The Lions tallied a season-high 474 yards of offense on the day.

==== Week 14: vs. Tampa Bay Buccaneers ====
Week 14: Tampa Bay Buccaneers at Detroit Lions – Game summary

Quarter	1	2	3	4	Total
Buccaneers	0	10	0	7	**17**
**Lions**	7	10	10	7	**34**

at Ford Field, Detroit, Michigan

- Date: December 7
- Game time: 1:00 p.m. EST
- Game weather: None (indoor stadium)
- Game attendance: 61,489
- Referee: Jeff Triplette
- TV announcers (Fox): Dick Stockton, Brady Quinn and Kristina Pink
- Recap, Game Book

Game information

**First quarter**

- DET – Calvin Johnson 6-yard pass from Matthew Stafford (Matt Prater kick), 2:57. Lions 7–0. **Drive: 11 plays, 70 yards, 5:11.**

**Second quarter**

- TB – Patrick Murray 54-yard field goal, 13:32. Lions 7–3. **Drive: 12 plays, 44 yards, 4:25.**
- DET – Joique Bell 1-yard run (Matt Prater kick), 6:01. Lions 14–3. **Drive: 8 plays, 34 yards, 4:00.**
- DET – Matt Prater 46-yard field goal, 3:01. Lions 17–3. **Drive: 4 plays, 4 yards, 2:03.**
- TB – Mike Evans 5-yard pass from Josh McCown (Patrick Murray kick), 0:05. Lions 17–10. **Drive: 4 plays, 10 yards, 1:30.**

**Third quarter**

- DET – Matt Prater 23-yard field goal, 11:14. Lions 20–10. **Drive: 5 plays, 56 yards, 1:41.**
- DET – Joseph Fauria 10-yard pass from Matthew Stafford (Matt Prater kick), 0:15. Lions 27–10. **Drive: 10 plays, 88 yards, 5:27.**

**Fourth quarter**

- TB – Mike Evans 26-yard pass from Josh McCown (Patrick Murray kick), 12:52. Lions 27–17. **Drive: 6 plays, 81 yards, 2:23.**
- DET – Joique Bell 5-yard pass from Matthew Stafford (Matt Prater kick), 5:01. Lions 34–17 **Drive: 6 plays, 92 yards, 2:54.**

**Top passers**

- TB – Josh McCown – 20/39, 250 yards, 2 TD, 2 INT
- DET – Matthew Stafford – 26/34, 311 yards, 3 TD

**Top rushers**

- TB – Doug Martin – 5 rushes, 22 yards
- DET – Joique Bell – 18 rushes, 83 yards, TD

**Top receivers**

- TB – Vincent Jackson – 10 receptions, 159 yards
- DET – Calvin Johnson – 8 receptions, 158 yards, TD

After a long break, the Lions hosted the struggling Tampa Bay Buccaneers. Detroit started the scoring with a 6-yard touchdown catch by Calvin Johnson from Matthew Stafford in the first quarter, giving them a lead they kept for the rest of the game. The Buccaneers responded with a 54-yard field goal by Patrick Murray in the second quarter. The Lions added to their lead with a 1-yard touchdown run by Joique Bell, then a 46-yard field goal by Matt Prater. Tampa Bay ended the second quarter with a 5-yard touchdown catch by Mike Evans from Josh McCown, making the score 17–10 at halftime. The Lions added 10 more points to their lead in the third quarter with a 23-yard field goal from Matt Prater, then a 10-yard Joseph Fauria touchdown catch from Matthew Stafford. In the final quarter, Tampa Bay scored their only points of the second half, with a 26-yard touchdown catch by Mike Evans from Josh McCown. The Lions then capped their victory with a 5-yard touchdown catch by Joique Bell off a deflected Matthew Stafford pass. The win gave Detroit a 9–4 record, the first time for the franchise since 1991, keeping them in the hunt for a spot in the playoffs. This game was Jim Caldwell's first against the Buccaneers, the team he was the quarterbacks coach for in 2001.

==== Week 15: vs. Minnesota Vikings ====
Week 15: Minnesota Vikings at Detroit Lions – Game summary

Quarter	1	2	3	4	Total
Vikings	7	7	0	0	**14**
**Lions**	0	10	3	3	**16**

at Ford Field, Detroit, Michigan

- Date: December 14
- Game time: 4:25 p.m. EST
- Game weather: None (indoor stadium)
- Game attendance: 62,490
- Referee: Pete Morelli
- TV announcers (Fox): Chris Myers, Ronde Barber and Jennifer Hale
- Recap, Game Book

Game information

**First quarter**

- MIN – Matt Asiata 2-yard run (Blair Walsh kick), 0:16. Vikings 7–0. **Drive: 10 plays, 80 yards, 5:09.**

**Second quarter**

- MIN – Greg Jennings 8-yard pass from Teddy Bridgewater (Blair Walsh kick), 10:05. Vikings 14–0. **Drive: 7 plays, 75 yards, 3:53.**
- DET – Golden Tate 7-yard pass from Matthew Stafford (Matt Prater kick), 3:42. Vikings 14–7. **Drive: 2 plays, 11 yards, 0:45.**
- DET – Matt Prater 29-yard field goal, 0:00. Vikings 14–10. **Drive: 7 plays, 21 yards, 3:00.**

**Third quarter**

- DET – Matt Prater 30-yard field goal, 3:45. Vikings 14–13. **Drive: 13 plays, 74 yards, 7:19.**

**Fourth quarter**

- DET – Matt Prater 33-yard field goal, 3:38. Lions 16–14. **Drive: 10 plays, 65 yards, 4:05.**

**Top passers**

- MIN – Teddy Bridgewater – 31/41, 315 yards, TD, 2 INT
- DET – Matthew Stafford – 17/28, 153 yards, TD

**Top rushers**

- MIN – Matt Asiata – 11 rushes, 36 yards, TD
- DET – Joique Bell – 15 rushes, 62 yards

**Top receivers**

- MIN – Charles Johnson – 5 receptions, 72 yards
- DET – Calvin Johnson – 4 receptions, 53 yards

In week 15, the Lions hosted a rematch with their division rival Minnesota Vikings. Detroit got off to a slow start, as Minnesota scored two touchdowns to take a 14–0 lead by early in the second quarter. Matt Asiata scored first on a 2-yard TD run and Greg Jennings followed on Minnesota's next possession, catching an 8-yard TD pass from Teddy Bridgewater. Meanwhile, the Lions offense was held without a first down on its first four possessions. The defense helped the Lions narrow the gap by halftime. Glover Quin picked off a Bridgewater pass and returned it to the Vikings 11-yard line. Two plays later, Matthew Stafford hit Golden Tate with a 7-yard TD pass. On Minnesota's next possession, Bridgewater was intercepted again, this time by Darius Slay. That led to a 29-yard Matt Prater field goal, cutting Minnesota's lead to 14–10 at halftime. In the third quarter, the Lions inched closer on a 30-yard Prater field goal, making the score 14–13. It appeared the Vikings would extend their lead when Blair Walsh lined up for a 26-yard field goal try, but Jason Jones partially blocked the kick and it sailed wide. The Lions went ahead on their next possession when Prater made good on a 33-yard field goal. The final score remained 16–14 Lions, as Minnesota failed to score on its final two possessions. The win gave the Lions a 10–4 record for the first time since 1991 (and only the third time in franchise history, the other being 1970), their fourth consecutive division win (keeping them undefeated in the NFC North), and put them back in first place since Green Bay lost to Buffalo earlier in the day.

==== Week 16: at Chicago Bears ====
Week 16: Detroit Lions at Chicago Bears – Game summary

Quarter	1	2	3	4	Total
**Lions**	7	0	3	10	**20**
Bears	0	7	7	0	**14**

at Soldier Field, Chicago, Illinois

- Date: December 21
- Game time: 1:00 p.m. EST/12:00 p.m. CST
- Game weather: Cloudy, 36 °F (2 °C)
- Game attendance: 61,420
- Referee: Gene Steratore
- TV announcers (Fox): Joe Buck, Troy Aikman and Erin Andrews
- Recap, Game Book

Game information

**First quarter**

- DET – Reggie Bush 13-yard run (Matt Prater kick), 5:15. Lions 7–0. **Drive: 7 plays, 57 yards, 3:00.**

**Second quarter**

- CHI – Matt Forte 11-yard pass from Jimmy Clausen (Jay Feely kick), 0:30. Tied 7–7. **Drive: 1 plays, 11 yards, 0:06.**

**Third quarter**

- DET – Matt Prater 39-yard field goal, 10:24. Lions 10–7. **Drive: 10 plays, 47 yards, 4:36.**
- CHI – Alshon Jeffery 20-yard pass from Jimmy Clausen (Jay Feely kick), 2:45. Bears 14–10. **Drive: 14 plays, 80 yards, 7:39.**

**Fourth quarter**

- DET – Joique Bell 17-yard run (Matt Prater kick), 7:15. Lions 17–14. **Drive: 4 plays, 73 yards, 1:05.**
- DET – Matt Prater 30-yard field goal, 2:35. Lions 20–14. **Drive: 9 plays, 43 yards, 2:59.**

**Top passers**

- DET – Matthew Stafford – 22/39, 243 yards, 2 INT
- CHI – Jimmy Clausen – 23/39, 181 yards, 2 TD, INT

**Top rushers**

- DET – Joique Bell – 13 rushes, 74 yards, TD
- CHI – Matt Forte – 19 rushes, 55 yards

**Top receivers**

- DET – Calvin Johnson – 6 receptions, 103 yards
- CHI – Alshon Jeffery – 6 receptions, 72 yards, TD

In Week 16, the Lions traveled west for a re-match with their division rival the Chicago Bears. The Lions entered the game having already clinched a playoff spot, thanks to the Washington Redskins' win over the Philadelphia Eagles the previous day. Each team scored a touchdown in the first half. First Detroit's Reggie Bush ran one in from 13 yards out in the first quarter, then Chicago's Matt Forte caught an 11-yard pass from Jimmy Clausen late in the second quarter to tie it up at halftime. The Lions took the lead in the third quarter with a 39-yard field goal by Matt Prater, but the Bears went ahead with a 20-yard touchdown pass from Clausen to Alshon Jeffery. In the final quarter, Detroit scored 10 unanswered points for the victory: first a 17-yard touchdown run by Joique Bell, then a 30-yard field goal from Matt Prater. The win was the fifth of the season in which the Lions trailed entering the fourth quarter. It made the Lions 11–4 for the first time since 1991 and kept them undefeated against divisional opponents.

==== Week 17: at Green Bay Packers ====
Week 17: Detroit Lions at Green Bay Packers – Game summary

Quarter	1	2	3	4	Total
Lions	0	7	7	6	**20**
**Packers**	7	7	7	9	**30**

at Lambeau Field, Green Bay, Wisconsin

- Date: December 28
- Game time: 4:25 p.m. EST/3:25 p.m. CST
- Game weather: Cloudy, light snow, 27 °F (−3 °C)
- Game attendance: 78,408
- Referee: Walt Anderson
- TV announcers (Fox): Joe Buck, Troy Aikman and Erin Andrews
- Recap, Game Book

Game information

**First quarter**

- GB – Micah Hyde 55-yard punt return (Mason Crosby kick), 4:49. Packers 7–0. **Drive: 5 plays, 8 yards, 2:55.**

**Second quarter**

- GB – Randall Cobb 4-yard pass from Aaron Rodgers (Mason Crosby kick), 2:24. Packers 14–0. **Drive: 6 plays, 69 yards, 3:55.**
- DET – Calvin Johnson 20-yard pass from Matthew Stafford (Matt Prater kick), 0:24. Packers 14–7. **Drive: 8 plays, 77 yards, 2:00.**

**Third quarter**

- DET – Calvin Johnson 4-yard pass from Matthew Stafford (Matt Prater kick), 7:34. Tied 14–14. **Drive: 11 plays, 51 yards, 5:21.**
- GB – Randall Cobb 13-yard pass from Aaron Rodgers (Mason Crosby kick), 3:33. Packers 21–14. **Drive: 7 plays, 60 yards, 4:01.**

**Fourth quarter**

- GB – Aaron Rodgers 1-yard run (Mason Crosby kick), 8:45. Packers 28–14. **Drive: 9 plays, 42 yards, 4:43.**
- GB – Penalty on Matthew Stafford enforced in the end zone for a safety, 2:32. Packers 30–14.
- DET – Theo Riddick 6-yard pass from Matthew Stafford (run failed), 1:45. Packers 30–20. **Drive: 5 plays, 44 yards, 0:47.**

**Top passers**

- DET – Matthew Stafford – 20/41, 217 yards, 3 TD
- GB – Aaron Rodgers – 17/22, 226 yards, 2 TD

**Top rushers**

- DET – Joique Bell – 13 rushes, 60 yards
- GB – Eddie Lacy – 26 rushes, 100 yards

**Top receivers**

- DET – Golden Tate – 3 receptions, 45 yards
- GB – Jordy Nelson – 6 receptions, 86 yards

To end the regular season, the Lions visited their division rival, the Green Bay Packers, in a game that determined the NFC North's winner. The Packers took an early lead with a 55-yard punt return touchdown run by Micah Hyde in the opening quarter, and added more points in the second quarter, when Randall Cobb caught a 4-yard touchdown pass from Aaron Rodgers. The Lions then scored their only points of the first half when Calvin Johnson caught a 20-yard touchdown pass from Matthew Stafford to make the score 14–7 at halftime. After the break Johnson and Stafford hooked up again with a 4-yard pass to tie the score. Green Bay responded with a 13-yard touchdown catch from Rodgers to Cobb. In the final quarter, the Packers added to their lead when Rodgers ran in a touchdown from 1 yard out. Matthew Stafford was later flagged for intentional grounding in the end zone, giving the Packers a safety. The Lions scored the game's final points when Theo Riddick caught a 6-yard pass from Stafford; they attempted a two-point conversion but failed. With the loss, the Lions finished the season 11–5, good for second place in the NFC North and a wildcard spot in the playoffs.

=== Standings ===
==== Division ====
NFC North
	W	L	T	PCT	DIV	CONF	PF	PA	STK
^{(2)} Green Bay Packers	12	4	0	.750	5–1	9–3	486	348	W2
^{(6)} Detroit Lions	11	5	0	.688	5–1	9–3	321	282	L1
Minnesota Vikings	7	9	0	.438	1–5	6–6	325	343	W1
Chicago Bears	5	11	0	.313	1–5	4–8	319	442	L5

==== Conference ====
NFC
#	Team	Division	W	L	T	PCT	DIV	CONF	SOS	SOV	STK
**Division leaders**
1 (Note: Seattle, Green Bay and Dallas were ranked in seeds 1–3 based on conference record.)	Seattle Seahawks	West	12	4	0	.750	5–1	10–2	.525	.513	W6
2	Green Bay Packers	North	12	4	0	.750	5–1	9–3	.482	.440	W2
3	Dallas Cowboys	East	12	4	0	.750	4–2	8–4	.445	.422	W4
4	Carolina Panthers	South	7	8	1	.469	4–2	6–6	.490	.357	W4
**Wild Cards**
5 (Note: Arizona defeated Detroit head-to-head (Week 11, 14–6).)	Arizona Cardinals	West	11	5	0	.688	3–3	8–4	.523	.477	L2
6	Detroit Lions	North	11	5	0	.688	5–1	9–3	.471	.392	L1
**Did not qualify for the postseason**
7	Philadelphia Eagles	East	10	6	0	.625	4–2	6–6	.490	.416	W1
8	San Francisco 49ers	West	8	8	0	.500	2–4	7–5	.527	.508	W1
9 (Note: New Orleans defeated Minnesota head-to-head (Week 3, 20–9).)	New Orleans Saints	South	7	9	0	.438	3–3	6–6	.486	.415	W1
10	Minnesota Vikings	North	7	9	0	.438	1–5	6–6	.475	.308	W1
11 (Note: The NY Giants defeated both Atlanta and St. Louis head-to-head (Atlanta: Week 5, 30–20; St. Louis: Week 16, 37–27), while Atlanta finished ahead of St. Louis based on conference record.)	New York Giants	East	6	10	0	.375	2–4	4–8	.512	.323	L1
12	Atlanta Falcons	South	6	10	0	.375	5–1	6–6	.482	.380	L1
13	St. Louis Rams	West	6	10	0	.375	2–4	4–8	.531	.427	L3
14	Chicago Bears	North	5	11	0	.313	1–5	4–8	.529	.338	L5
15	Washington Redskins	East	4	12	0	.250	2–4	2–10	.496	.422	L1
16	Tampa Bay Buccaneers	South	2	14	0	.125	0–6	1–11	.486	.469	L6
**Tiebreakers** (Note: When breaking ties for three or more teams under the NFL's rules, they are first broken within divisions, then comparing only the highest-ranked remaining team from each division.)

== Postseason ==
=== Schedule ===
Round	Date	Opponent (seed)	Result	Record	Venue	Recap
Wild Card	January 4, 2015	at Dallas Cowboys (3)	L 20–24	0–1	AT&T Stadium	Recap

=== Game summaries ===
==== NFC Wild Card Game: at Dallas Cowboys ====
NFC Wild Card Game: Detroit Lions at Dallas Cowboys – Game summary

Quarter	1	2	3	4	Total
Lions	14	3	3	0	20
Cowboys	0	7	7	10	24

at AT&T Stadium, Arlington, Texas

- Date: January 4, 2015
- Game time: 4:40 p.m. EST/3:40 p.m. CST
- Game weather: Played indoors (retractable roof stadium with roof closed)
- Game attendance: 91,410
- Referee: Pete Morelli
- TV announcers (Fox): Joe Buck, Troy Aikman, Erin Andrews and Chris Myers
- Recap, Game Book

Game information

First quarter

- DET – Golden Tate 51-yard pass from Matthew Stafford (Matt Prater kick), 11:22. Lions 7–0. Drive: 4 plays, 62 yards, 2:04.
- DET – Reggie Bush 18-yard run (Matt Prater kick), 1:57. Lions 14–0. Drive: 14 plays, 99 yards, 7:10.

Second quarter

- DAL – Terrance Williams 76-yard pass from Tony Romo (Dan Bailey kick), 1:37. Lions 14–7. Drive: 3 plays, 74 yards, 0:38.
- DET – Matt Prater 39-yard field goal, 0:03. Lions 17–7. Drive: 10 plays, 59 yards, 1:34.

Third quarter

- DET – Matt Prater 37-yard field goal, 8:41. Lions 20–7. Drive: 8 plays, 50 yards, 4:03.
- DAL – DeMarco Murray 1-yard run (Dan Bailey kick), 2:54. Lions 20–14. Drive: 10 plays, 80 yards, 5:47.

Fourth quarter

- DAL – Dan Bailey 51-yard field goal, 12:16. Lions 20–17. Drive: 7 plays, 36 yards, 4:00.
- DAL – Terrance Williams 8-yard pass from Tony Romo (Dan Bailey kick), 2:32. Cowboys 24–20. Drive: 11 plays, 59 yards, 5:38.

Top passers

- DET – Matthew Stafford – 28/42, 323 yards, TD, INT
- DAL – Tony Romo – 19/31, 293 yards, 2 TD

Top rushers

- DET – Joique Bell – 12 rushes, 43 yards
- DAL – DeMarco Murray – 19 rushes, 75 yards, TD

Top receivers

- DET – Golden Tate – 6 receptions, 89 yards, TD
- DAL – Terrance Williams – 3 receptions, 92 yards, 2 TD

Hoping to win their first playoff game since the 1991 season, the Lions visited the Dallas Cowboys. Detroit took an early lead in the first quarter with a pair of touchdowns, first on a 51-yard reception by Golden Tate, then an 18-yard run by Reggie Bush. Dallas responded in the second quarter with a 76-yard touchdown catch by Terrance Williams. The Lions added three more points with a 39-yard Matt Prater field goal just before halftime to make the score 17–7. After the break, Detroit increased their lead with another Prater field goal, this one from 37 yards. The Cowboys responded with a 1-yard touchdown run by DeMarco Murray. In the final quarter, Dallas cut the lead to three with a 51-yard field goal from Dan Bailey before going ahead with an 8-yard touchdown catch by Terrance Williams. This final touchdown capped a 59-yard drive that came after a controversially changed pass interference call against the Cowboys, which would have given the Lions a first down near the Dallas 30-yard line. The Cowboys took over and sealed a date with Green Bay.
