= List of Bloomsburg Huskies in the NFL draft =

This is a list of Bloomsburg Huskies players in the NFL draft.

== Key ==
B	Back	K	Kicker	NT	Nose tackle
C	Center	LB	Linebacker	FB	Fullback
DB	Defensive back	P	Punter	HB	Halfback
DE	Defensive end	QB	Quarterback	WR	Wide receiver
DT	Defensive tackle	RB	Running back	G	Guard
E	End	T	Offensive tackle	TE	Tight end

= Pro Bowler
= Hall of Famer

== Selections ==
Year	Round	Pick	Overall	Player	Team	Position
1950	27	7	346	Elmer Kreiser	Pittsburgh Steelers	E
1972	13	5	317	Bob Warner	Denver Broncos	RB
1980	7	12	177	Mike Morucci	New Orleans Saints	RB
1992	5	28	140	Eric Jonassen	San Diego Chargers	TE
2006	4	11	108	Jahri Evans	New Orleans Saints	OT
2014	4	36	136	Larry Webster III	Detroit Lions	DE
