= Glover Quin =

American football player (born 1986)

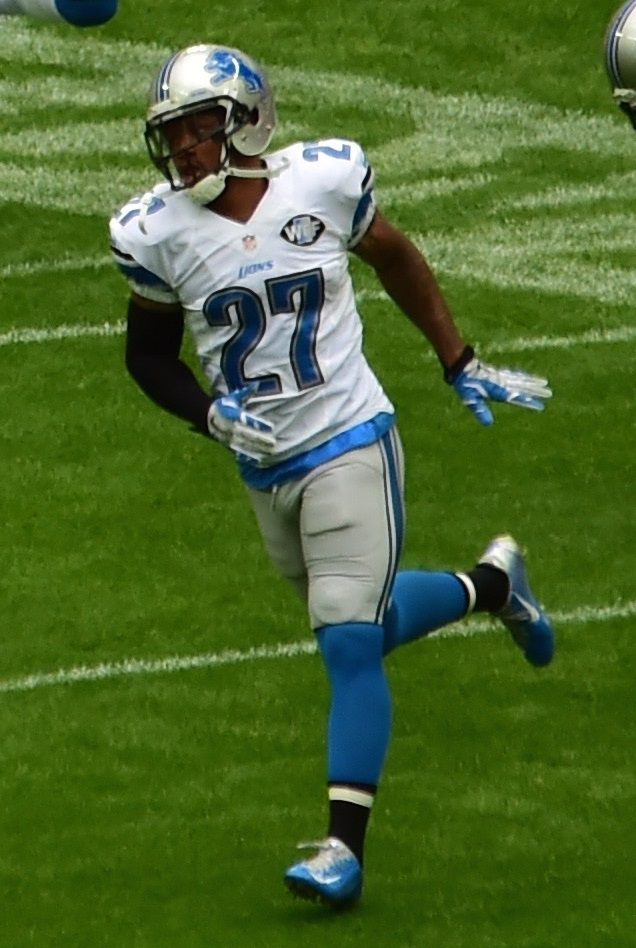
- Quin with the Detroit Lions in 2014

No. 29, 27
- Position: Safety

Personal information
- Born: January 15, 1986 (age 40); McComb, Mississippi, U.S.
- Listed height: 5 ft 11 in (1.80 m)
- Listed weight: 207 lb (94 kg)

Career information
- High school: North Pike (Summit, Mississippi)
- College: Southwest Mississippi CC (2004–2005); New Mexico (2006–2008)
- NFL draft: 2009: 4th round, 112th overall pick

Career history
- Houston Texans (2009–2012); Detroit Lions (2013–2018)

Awards and highlights
- Second-team All-Pro (2014); Pro Bowl (2014); NFL interceptions leader (2014); First-team All-MW (2008)

Career NFL statistics
- Total tackles: 737
- Sacks: 4
- Pass deflections: 84
- Interceptions: 24
- Forced fumbles: 10
- Defensive touchdowns: 2
- Stats at Pro Football Reference

Glover Freeman Quin Jr. (born January 15, 1986) is an American former professional football player who was a safety in the National Football League (NFL). He played college football for the New Mexico Lobos, and was selected by the Houston Texans in the fourth round of the 2009 NFL draft. Quinn stayed in Houston for four seasons. He then also played for the Detroit Lions for six seasons.

== Early life ==
A four-year letterman in football and basketball, Quin graduated from North Pike High School in 2004. During his senior year, Quin received the MVP award from both his basketball and football team at North Pike. By the end of his high school career, Quin had rushed for 2,552 yards, made 224 tackles and 13 interceptions. Quin was awarded the U.S. Army Scholar Athlete Award.

== College career ==
Quin transferred into the University of New Mexico after spending a year at Southwest Mississippi Community College. Quin was a three-year starter at the cornerback position for the University of New Mexico.

In 2006, during his sophomore season, Quin received an Honorable Mention on the All Mountain West Conference (MWC), team as a sophomore. During the season, Quin started 13 games for the Lobos. Quin led the MWC with 12 pass break-ups and was second in the league, behind his teammate DeAndre Wright in passes defended with 12. Glover Quin was 3rd on the Lobos and 29th in the MWC with 63 tackles on the year.

In 2007, during his junior season, Quin again received Honorable Mention on the All Mountain West Conference Team. Early in the season, Quin suffered a painful groin injury that required surgery. Upon his return, the Lobos' defense improved its allowed passing yardage from 255.6 yards in its first five games down to 161 yards in its final eight games. Quin tied for third in the MWC with 10 passes defended.

In 2008, during his senior season, Quin was selected as a first-team All Mountain West Conference player. Quin had a remarkable season that ended with him missing only five tackles throughout the season. He was voted team MVP by his teammates; an honor that had not gone to a defensive player for the school since Brian Urlacher was given the honor in 1999. Quin became the first cornerback in Lobos' history to win the award.

== Professional career ==
=== Pre-draft ===
Quin attended the NFL Scouting Combine in Indianapolis, Indiana, and completed all of the combine drills. He performed well and also ran positional drills for scouts. On March 12, 2009, he participated at New Mexico's pro day, but opted to stand on his combine numbers and only performed positional drills. At the conclusion of the pre-draft process, Quin was projected to be a fifth round pick by NFL draft experts and scouts. He was ranked the seventh best free safety prospect in the draft by DraftScout.com and was ranked the 25th best cornerback prospect in the draft by WalterFootball.com.

Pre-draft measurables
Height	Weight	Arm length	Hand span	40-yard dash	10-yard split	20-yard split	20-yard shuttle	Three-cone drill	Vertical jump	Broad jump	Bench press
5 ft 10 3/4 in (1.80 m)	204 lb (93 kg)	30 1/2 in (0.77 m)	9 1/8 in (0.23 m)	4.56 s	1.58 s	2.64 s	4.43 s	7.39 s	38 in (0.97 m)	9 ft 11 in (3.02 m)	22 reps
All values from NFL Combine

=== Houston Texans ===
==== 2009 ====
The Houston Texans selected Quin in the fourth round (112th overall) in the 2009 NFL draft. He was the eighth safety drafted in 2008.

On July 17, 2009, the Houston Texans signed Quin to a four-year, $2.24 million contract that includes a signing bonus of $490,250.

Throughout training camp, Quin competed for a job as a backup cornerback against Antwaun Molden, Fred Bennett, David Pittman, Brice McCain, and Matterral Richardson. He was impressive throughout camp and was able to progress quickly after Jacques Reeves sustained a broken leg and Dunta Robinson chose to holdout for a new contract. NFL analyst Gil Brandt stated Quin would be one of the biggest surprises in the league as a rookie. Head coach Gary Kubiak named Quin the third cornerback and starting nickelback on the depth chart to start the regular season, behind Dunta Robinson and Fred Bennett.

He made his professional regular season debut in the Houston Texans' season-opener against the New York Jets and made five combined tackles in their 24–7 loss. Quin made his first career tackle on running back Leon Washington during his eight-yard reception on the Jets' first drive. On October 4, 2009, Quin earned his first career start after surpassing Fred Bennett on the depth chart and taking over the starting role. He collected five combined tackles during a 29–6 win against the Oakland Raiders in Week 4. In Week 9, Quin collected a season-high four pass deflections and six solo tackles in the Texans' 20–17 loss to the Indianapolis Colts. He was inactive for the Texans' Week 13 loss at the Jacksonville Jaguars after sustaining a concussion the previous week. He returned in Week 14 and recorded a season-high eight combined tackles during a 34–7 victory against the Seattle Seahawks. Quin finished his rookie season in 2009 with 68 combined tackles (56 solo) and 11 pass deflections in 15 games and 12 starts.

==== 2010 ====
Quin entered training camp slated as the No. 1 starting cornerback after Dunta Robinson departed in free agency. Quin saw minor competition from Jacques Reeves, Antwaun Molden, Brice McCain, and Fred Bennett. Defensive coordinator Frank Bush named Quin and rookie Kareem Jackson the starting cornerbacks to begin the regular season.

He started in the Houston Texans' season-opener against the Indianapolis Colts and made four combined tackles, a pass deflection, and a fumble recovery in their 34–24 victory. In Week 10, Quin collected a season-high 13 solo tackles and deflected a pass during a 31–24 loss at the Jacksonville Jaguars; he also batted down the game-winning pass into the hands of Jaguars receiver Mike Thomas. On November 28, 2010, Quin recorded a career-high five pass deflections, made four combined tackles, and intercepted three passes by quarterback Rusty Smith in the Texans' 20–0 win against Tennessee Titans in Week 14. He made his first career interception off a pass intended for Nate Washington in the second quarter. His first career multi-interception game earned him the AFC Defensive Player of the Week. He finished his second season with a career-high 85 combined tackles (71 solo), 14 pass deflections, and three interceptions in 16 games and 16 starts.

==== 2011 ====
On February 22, 2011, it was reported that Texans' defensive coordinator Wade Phillips was planning to move Quin to safety after discussing it with Quin before the beginning of the NFL lockout. During the draft, multiple analysts stated Quin was better suited to play safety. The move was due to the Texans lack of depth at safety after the departure of Bernard Pollard and was also due to Quin's ability to cover the slot. On July 29, 2011, the Houston Texans signed veteran cornerback Johnathan Joseph to assume Quin's starting job at cornerback. After the signing of Joseph, defensive coordinator Wade Phillips stated Quin would now be moving to safety. Head coach Gary Kubiak officially named Quin the starting strong safety to start the regular season, along with free safety Danieal Manning.

On September 25, 2011, Quin recorded a season-high eight combined tackles during a 40–33 loss at the New Orleans Saints in Week 3. He finished the season with 77 combined tackles (59 solo) and nine pass deflections in 16 games and 16 starts.

The Houston Texans finished the 2011 season first in the AFC South with a 10–6 record. On January 7, 2012, Quin started in his first career playoff game and recorded five combined tackles in the Texans' 31–10 win against the Cincinnati Bengals in the AFC Wild Card Round. The following week, he collected three combined tackles as the Texans were eliminated from the playoffs after a 20–13 loss at the Baltimore Ravens in the AFC Divisional Round.

==== 2012 ====
Defensive coordinator Wade Phillips opted to move Quin to free safety and named him the starter to open the regular season. He played alongside Danieal Manning who took over duties at strong safety.

On September 30, 2012, Quin recorded six combined tackles and made his first career sack on quarterback Matt Hasselbeck during a 38–14 win against the Tennessee Titans in Week 4. In Week 7, he made a season-high three pass deflections, five combined tackles, and intercepted a pass by Joe Flacco in the Texans' 43–13 victory against the Baltimore Ravens. On December 23, 2012, Quin collected a season-high ten combined tackles (nine solo) in a 23–6 loss against the Minnesota Vikings in Week 16. He finished the season with 84 combined tackles (64 solo), a career-high 14 pass deflections, two interceptions, and a sack in 16 games and 16 starts.

The Houston Texans finished atop their division with a 12–4 record. On January 5, 2013, Quin made three pass deflections and two solo tackles during a 19–13 victory against the Cincinnati Bengals in the AFC Wild Card Round. The following week, he made five combined tackles in the Texans' 41–28 loss to the New England Patriots in the AFC Divisional Round.

==== 2012 ====
Quin became an unrestricted free agent after the 2012 season and was intent on staying with the Houston Texans. Many analysts cited Quin as the Texans' top free agent priority. The Texans general manager Rick Smith decided against the franchise tag and Quin's agent claimed Quin never received an offer from the Texans. On March 12, 2013, it was reported that Quin was visiting the Detroit Lions immediately after the free agency period began.

=== Detroit Lions ===
On March 13, 2013, the Detroit Lions signed Quin to a five-year, $23.50 million contract that includes $6.25 million guaranteed and a signing bonus of $5.25 million.

Head coach Jim Schwartz named Quin the starting strong safety to begin the regular season, alongside free safety Louis Delmas.

He started in the Detroit Lions' season-opener against the Minnesota Vikings and recorded two combined tackles, a pass deflection, and intercepted a pass by quarterback Christian Ponder in their 34–24 victory. The following week, he collected a season-high six solo tackles and deflected a pass during a 25–21 loss at the Arizona Cardinals in Week 2. In Week 4, he made a season-high two pass deflections, a solo tackle, and intercepted a pass by Jay Cutler during a 40–32 victory against the Chicago Bears. On December 31, 2013, the Detroit Lions fired head coach Jim Schwartz after finishing third in the NFC North with a 7–9 record in 2013. He finished the season with 57 combined tackles (44 solo), eight pass deflections, three interceptions, a sack, and a forced fumble in 16 games and 16 starts.

==== 2014 ====
On February 21, 2014, it was reported that Quin underwent a minor surgery to repair a torn ligament in his ankle that he had for the majority of the season after injuring it in Week 4. Defensive coordinator Teryl Austin chose to move Quin to free safety after the departure of Louis Delmas and the arrival of James Ihedigbo. Head coach Jim Caldwell officially named Quin the starter to begin the regular season, alongside strong safety James Ihedigbo.

He started in the Detroit Lions' season-opener against the New York Giants and recorded five combined tackles, a pass deflection, and intercepted a pass by Eli Manning in their 35–14 victory. On October 26, 2014, Quin collected a season-high eight solo tackles during a 22–21 win at the Atlanta Falcons in Week 8. In Week 13, he made seven combined tackles, a pass deflection, and intercepted a pass by Jay Cutler in their 34–17 win against the Chicago Bears. The following week, he collected a season-high three pass deflections, two tackles, and an interception in a 34–17 victory against the Tampa Bay Buccaneers. On December 21, 2014, Quin made two combined tackles, broke up a pass, and intercepted a pass by Jay Cutler during a 20–14 win at the Chicago Bears in Week 16. His interception continued his streak of four games with an interception and became his seventh pick of the season. On December 24, 2014, Quin was announced as one of the players voted to appear in the 2015 Pro Bowl, marking the first Pro Bowl selection of his career. He finished the season with 73 combined tackles (57 solo), ten pass deflections, and a career-high seven interceptions in 16 games and 16 starts. His seven interceptions led the league in 2014 and his performance earned him a second-team All-Pro selection.

The Detroit Lions finished second in the NFC North with an 11–5 record. On January 4, 2015, Quin started at free safety and recorded two solo tackles in a 24–20 loss to the Dallas Cowboys in the NFC Wild Card Round. He was ranked 88th by his fellow players on the NFL Top 100 Players of 2015.

==== 2015 ====
Head coach Jim Caldwell retained Quin and James Ihedigbo as the starting safety duo to open the regular season in 2015.

Quin started in the Detroit Lions' season-opener at the San Diego Chargers and collected a season-high eight combined tackles, a pass deflection, and returned an interception by Philip Rivers for a 31-yard touchdown in their 33–28 loss. The touchdown was the first of Quin's career. He finished the season with 67 combined tackles (56 solo), five pass deflections, four interceptions, and a forced fumble in 16 games and 16 starts.

==== 2016 ====
Head coach Jim Caldwell retained Quin as the starting free safety to begin the season, alongside strong safety Tavon Wilson. In Week 9, Quin collected a season-high nine combined tackles during a 22–16 victory at the Minnesota Vikings. On December 4, 2016, he made five combined tackles, a season-high two pass deflections, and intercepted a pass by quarterback Drew Brees in the Lions' 28–13 win at the New Orleans Saints in Week 13. Quin finished the 2016 season with 68 combined tackles (55 solo), five pass deflections, two interceptions, and a forced fumble in 16 games and 16 starts.

The Detroit Lions finished the 2016 season second in the NFC North with a 9–7 record. On January 7, 2017, Quin collected six combined tackles and a pass deflection during a 26–6 loss at the Seattle Seahawks in the NFC Wild Card Round.

==== 2017 ====
On July 30, 2017, the Detroit Lions signed Quin to a two-year, $13 million contract that includes $10 million guaranteed and a signing bonus of $5 million.

On September 24, 2017, Quin collected eight combined tackles, broke up a pass, and returned an interception by Matt Ryan for a 37-yard touchdown in the Lions' 30–26 loss to the Atlanta Falcons in Week 3. It became the second touchdown of his career. In Week 14, Quin collected a season-high nine combined tackles during a 24–21 victory at the Tampa Bay Buccaneers. He finished the season with 84 combined tackles (60 solo), six pass deflections, four forced fumbles, three interceptions, and a touchdown in 16 games and 16 starts. The Detroit Lions did not qualify for the playoffs after finishing second in the NFC North with a 9–7 record.

==== 2018 ====
Quin finished without an interception for the first time since 2011 in the 2018 season. He had one sack, 74 total tackles, and three passes defended in 16 games.

==== 2019 ====
On February 15, 2019, Quin was released by the Lions. He started all 96 regular season games during his six-year career in Detroit.

On July 9, 2019, Quin announced his retirement from the NFL after 10 seasons.

== NFL career statistics ==
Legend
	Led the league
**Bold**	Career high

=== Regular season ===
Year	Team	Games		Tackles					Interceptions					Fumbles			
Year	Team	GP	GS	Cmb	Solo	Ast	Sck	TFL	Int	Yds	TD	Lng	PD	FF	FR	Yds	TD
2009	HOU	15	12	68	56	12	0.0	3	0	0	0	0	11	0	0	0	0
2010	HOU	**16**	**16**	**85**	**71**	14	0.0	3	3	12	0	10	**14**	1	**2**	**3**	0
2011	HOU	**16**	**16**	77	59	18	0.0	2	0	0	0	0	9	0	1	0	0
2012	HOU	**16**	**16**	84	64	20	1.0	**6**	2	22	0	22	13	2	0	0	0
2013	DET	**16**	**16**	57	44	13	**2.0**	2	3	57	0	42	8	1	1	0	0
2014	DET	**16**	**16**	73	57	16	0.0	2	**7**	**117**	0	**56**	10	0	0	0	0
2015	DET	**16**	**16**	67	56	11	0.0	0	4	77	**1**	31	5	1	0	0	0
2016	DET	**16**	**16**	68	55	13	0.0	2	2	0	0	0	5	1	0	0	0
2017	DET	**16**	**16**	84	60	**24**	0.0	4	3	62	**1**	37	6	**4**	1	0	0
2018	DET	**16**	**16**	74	58	16	1.0	1	0	0	0	0	3	0	0	0	0
Career		159	156	737	580	157	4.0	25	24	347	2	56	84	10	5	3	0

=== Playoffs ===
Year	Team	Games		Tackles					Interceptions					Fumbles			
Year	Team	GP	GS	Cmb	Solo	Ast	Sck	TFL	Int	Yds	TD	Lng	PD	FF	FR	Yds	TD
2011	HOU	**2**	**2**	**8**	**6**	2	0.0	0	0	0	0	0	0	0	0	0	0
2012	HOU	**2**	**2**	7	3	**4**	0.0	0	0	0	0	0	**3**	0	0	0	0
2014	DET	1	1	2	2	0	0.0	0	0	0	0	0	0	0	0	0	0
2016	DET	1	1	6	2	**4**	0.0	**1**	0	0	0	0	1	0	0	0	0
Career		6	6	23	13	10	0.0	1	0	0	0	0	4	0	0	0	0

== Personal life ==
Quin was raised by his parents Glover and Annie Quin in Summit, Mississippi. He and his ex-wife, Gladys Quin, raised their three sons in Houston, Texas. His family was affected by Hurricane Harvey while Quin was with the Lions in Detroit. He volunteers as an assistant coach for his son Dacquan's little league baseball team.

He majored in business during his time at New Mexico. While in the league, Quin followed a 30–70 savings strategy that was presented to him by a financial advisor. He saved 70% of his salary and used the other 30% for yearly expenses. Quin has used his savings to invest in numerous well-known publicly traded companies. The majority of his investments accrued earnings that were expected to equal his total salary during his stint with the Detroit Lions. He also used 10–12% of his savings to help fund private up-and-coming businesses.

=== Philanthropy ===
Quin works with numerous charities including the Ms. Molly Foundation in Ann Arbor, Michigan. The foundation works with victims of domestic violence and Quin has attended charity events and assisted in raising funds for the organization. He also made a donation to help people effected by Hurricane Harvey. He pledged to donate $5,000 for an interception and $100 for a tackle during the 2017 season. Based on his statistics for 2017, his donation totaled $38,400. In 2016, Quin worked with other teammates to donate 36,000 bottles of water to the residents of Flint, Michigan, during the Flint water crisis. He also has worked closely with United Way for over nine years and has mentored children and held book readings with groups of kids. Quin also works with Me & the Bees Lemonade and became an angel investor for the charity in 2017.

== Career awards ==
- U.S. Army Scholar Athlete Award (2004)
- Honorable Mention All-Mountain West Conference (2006)
- Honorable Mention All-Mountain West Conference (2007)
- First-team All-Mountain West Conference (2008)
- AFC Defensive Player of the Week (Week 12, 2010)
- Detroit Sports Media (DSM) and Pro Football Writers Association (PFWA) Detroit Chapter Media-Friendly Good Guy Award winner (2014 & 2019)
