= 2014 All-Pro Team =

Official list of the best NFL players in 2014

The 2014 All-Pro Teams were named by the Associated Press (AP), the Pro Football Writers of America (PFWA), and the Sporting News (SN) for performance in the 2014 NFL season. While none of the All-Pro teams have the official imprimatur of the NFL (whose official recognition is nomination to the 2015 Pro Bowl (Note: The 2015 Pro Bowl represents the 2014 NFL season)), they are included in the NFL Record and Fact Book and also part of the language of the 2011 NFLPA Collective Bargaining Agreement. Any player selected to the first-team of any of the teams can be described as an "All-Pro." The AP team, with first-team and second-team selections, was chosen by a national panel of fifty NFL writers and broadcasters. The Sporting News All-NFL team is voted on by NFL players and executives and was released January 20, 2015. The PFWA team is selected by its more than 300 national members who are accredited media members covering the NFL.

== Teams ==
Offense
Position	First team	Second team
Quarterback	Aaron Rodgers, Green Bay (AP, PFWA, SN)	Tony Romo, Dallas (AP-2)
Running back	DeMarco Murray, Dallas (AP-t, PFWA, SN); Le'Veon Bell, Pittsburgh (AP-t, PFWA, SN)	Marshawn Lynch, Seattle (AP-2)
Fullback	John Kuhn, Green Bay (AP)	Anthony Sherman, Kansas City (AP-2)
Tight end	Rob Gronkowski, New England (AP, PFWA, SN) (Note: Rob Gronkowski was a unanimous selection at tight end, so there is no AP Second Team tight end.)	None
Wide receiver	Antonio Brown, Pittsburgh (AP, PFWA, SN); Dez Bryant, Dallas (AP, PFWA); Julio Jones, Atlanta (SN)	Jordy Nelson, Green Bay (AP-2); Demaryius Thomas, Denver (AP-2)
Tackle	Tyron Smith, Dallas (AP, PFWA, SN); Joe Thomas, Cleveland (AP, PFWA); Jason Peters, Philadelphia (SN)	Andrew Whitworth, Cincinnati (AP-2); Jason Peters, Philadelphia (AP-2)
Guard	Marshal Yanda, Baltimore Ravens (AP, PFWA, SN); Josh Sitton, Green Bay (PFWA, SN); Zack Martin, Dallas (AP)	Josh Sitton, Green Bay (AP-2); Kyle Long, Chicago (AP-2)
Center	Travis Frederick, Dallas (PFWA, SN); Maurkice Pouncey, Pittsburgh (AP)	Travis Frederick, Dallas (AP-2)

Special teams
Position	First team	Second team
Kicker	Adam Vinatieri, Indianapolis (AP, PFWA, SN)	Stephen Gostkowski, New England (AP-2)
Punter	Pat McAfee, Indianapolis (AP, PFWA); Kevin Huber, Cincinnati (SN)	Johnny Hekker, St. Louis (AP-2)
Return specialist	Adam Jones, Cincinnati (AP, PFWA-KR); Darren Sproles, Philadelphia (PFWA-PR, SN-PR); Jacoby Jones, Baltimore Ravens (SN-KR)	Darren Sproles, Philadelphia (AP-2)
Special teams	Matthew Slater, New England (PFWA)	

Defense
Position	First team	Second team
Defensive end	J. J. Watt, Houston (AP, (Note: J. J. Watt was a unanimous selection, appearing on 45 of 50 ballots at defensive end, and on the other five at defensive tackle) PFWA, SN); Mario Williams, Buffalo (AP, PFWA); Robert Quinn, St. Louis Rams (SN)	Fletcher Cox, Philadelphia (AP-2); Cameron Wake, Miami (AP-2t); Calais Campbell, Arizona (AP-2t)
Defensive tackle	Marcell Dareus, Buffalo (AP, PFWA); Ndamukong Suh, Detroit Lions (AP, PFWA, SN); Gerald McCoy, Tampa Bay (SN)	Gerald McCoy, Tampa Bay (AP-2); J. J. Watt, Houston (AP-2)
Outside linebacker	Justin Houston, Kansas City (AP, PFWA, SN); Von Miller, Denver (PFWA, SN); Elvis Dumervil, Baltimore (AP)	Von Miller, Denver (AP-2); Connor Barwin, Philadelphia (AP-2)
Inside linebacker	Luke Kuechly, Carolina (AP, PFWA, SN); Bobby Wagner, Seattle (AP)	C.J. Mosley, Baltimore (AP-2); DeAndre Levy, Detroit (AP-2t); Lawrence Timmons, Pittsburgh (AP-2t)
Cornerback	Darrelle Revis, New England (AP, PFWA, SN); Richard Sherman, Seattle (AP, PFWA, SN)	Chris Harris Jr., Denver (AP-2); Brent Grimes, Miami (AP-2)
Safety	Earl Thomas, Seattle (AP, PFWA, SN); Eric Weddle, San Diego (AP, PFWA, SN)	Kam Chancellor, Seattle (AP-2); Glover Quin, Detroit (AP-2)

== Key ==
- AP = Associated Press first-team All-Pro
- AP-2 = Associated Press second-team All-Pro
- AP-2t = Tied for second-team All-Pro in the AP vote
- PFWA = Pro Football Writers Association All-NFL
- SN = Sporting News All-Pro

== Position differences ==
- One AP voter selected only one running back; one AP voter did not select a fullback.
- AP voters do not vote at punt returner or special teams player
- Sporting News chose three wide receivers and no fullback
