= Joique Bell =

American football player (born 1986)

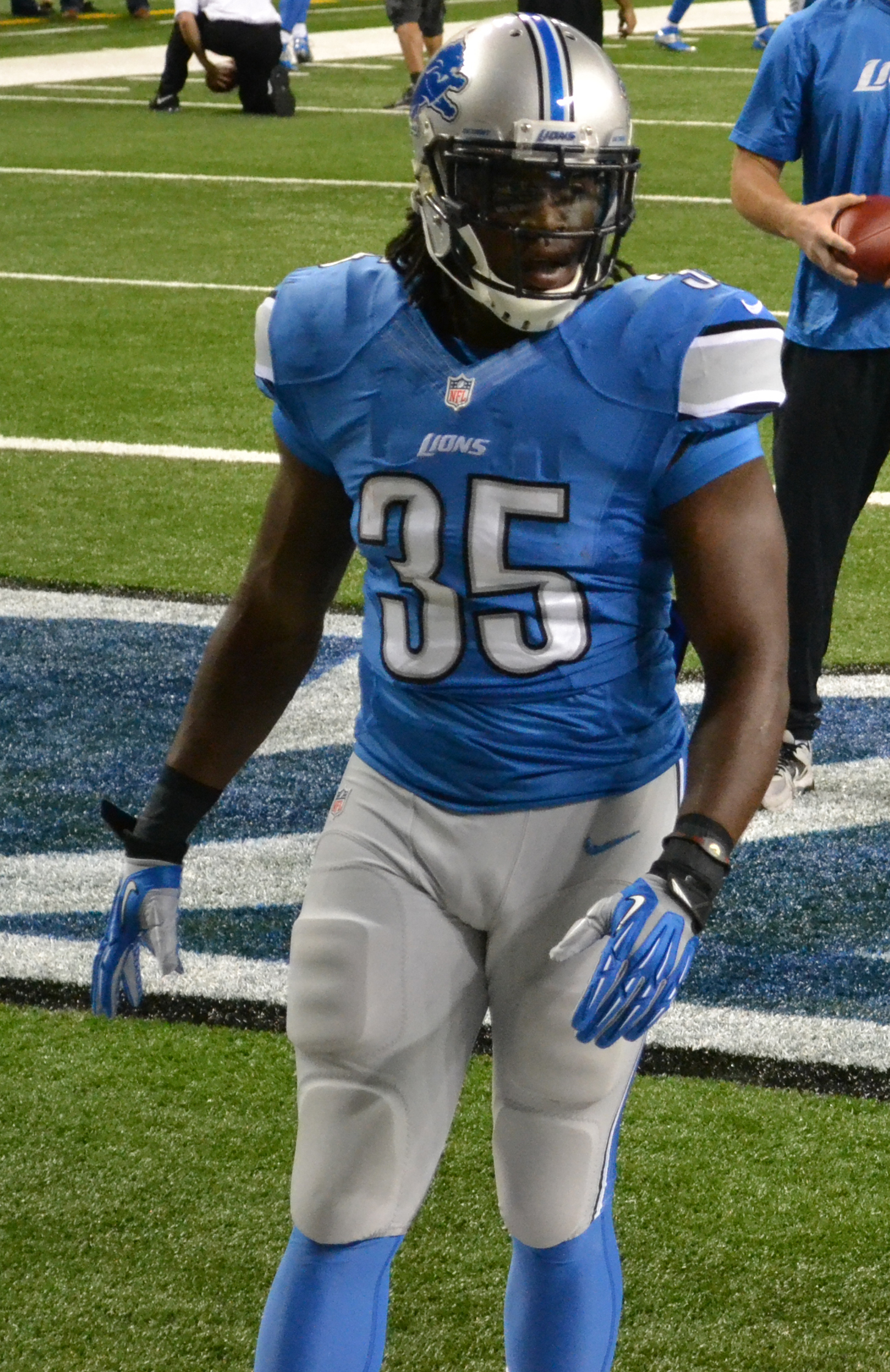
- Bell with the Detroit Lions in 2013

No. 24, 35, 43, 44
- Position: Running back

Personal information
- Born: August 4, 1986 (age 40); Benton Harbor, Michigan, U.S.
- Listed height: 5 ft 11 in (1.80 m)
- Listed weight: 231 lb (105 kg)

Career information
- High school: Benton Harbor
- College: Wayne State (2005–2009)
- NFL draft: 2010: undrafted

Career history
- Buffalo Bills (2010)*; Philadelphia Eagles (2010); Indianapolis Colts (2010); Philadelphia Eagles (2010)*; New Orleans Saints (2010–2011); Detroit Lions (2011–2015); Chicago Bears (2016); Detroit Lions (2016)
- * Offseason or practice squad member only

Awards and highlights
- Harlon Hill Trophy (2009); 2× Division II All-America (2006, 2009); 4× First-team All-GLIAC (2006–2009); Wayne State #5 retired

Career NFL statistics
- Rushing yards: 2,241
- Rushing average: 4
- Rushing touchdowns: 22
- Receptions: 162
- Receiving yards: 1,638
- Receiving touchdowns: 1
- Stats at Pro Football Reference

Joique Dewayne Bell Jr. (born August 4, 1986) is an American former professional football player who was a running back in the National Football League (NFL). He played college football for the Wayne State Warriors. Bell was signed by the Buffalo Bills as an undrafted free agent in 2010. He was also a member of the Philadelphia Eagles, Indianapolis Colts, New Orleans Saints, Detroit Lions, and Chicago Bears.

== College career ==
As a senior at Wayne State University, Bell was the winner of the Harlon Hill Trophy, awarded to the Division II player of the year, after he rushed for 2,084 yards and 29 touchdowns in the 2009 season.

== Professional career ==
Pre-draft measurables
Height	Weight	Arm length	Hand span	40-yard dash	10-yard split	20-yard split	20-yard shuttle	Three-cone drill	Vertical jump	Broad jump	Bench press
5 ft 11 1/4 in (1.81 m)	220 lb (100 kg)	31 1/2 in (0.80 m)	9 in (0.23 m)	4.68 s	1.62 s	2.68 s	4.17 s	6.84 s	36.5 in (0.93 m)	10 ft 0 in (3.05 m)	16 reps
All values from NFL Combine/Pro Day

=== Buffalo Bills ===
After going undrafted in the 2010 NFL draft, Bell signed with the Buffalo Bills on April 29, 2010. On September 4, he was released by the Bills during final team cuts. Bell was re-signed to the Bills' practice squad on the following day.

=== Philadelphia Eagles (first stint) ===
On September 21, 2010, the Philadelphia Eagles signed Bell off of the Bills' practice squad. He was released by the Eagles on November 10.

=== Indianapolis Colts ===
Bell was claimed off waivers by the Indianapolis Colts on November 11, 2010. On December 15, Bell was released by the team.

=== Philadelphia Eagles (second stint) ===
One day after his release from the Colts, on December 16, 2010, Bell was signed to the Philadelphia Eagles' practice squad.

=== New Orleans Saints ===
Bell was signed off the Eagles' practice squad by the New Orleans Saints on January 5, 2011, before the playoffs began. He was released by the team on September 20, and re-signed to the Saints' practice squad the following day.

=== Detroit Lions (first stint) ===
On December 26, 2011, Bell was signed by the Detroit Lions. He played his first game with the Lions on September 9, 2012. Bell appeared in all 16 games of the 2012 season, compiling 414 rushing yards on 82 carries (5.0 average) with three rushing touchdowns. He also hauled in 52 receptions for 485 yards; 28 of his receptions were for first downs.

Bell was re-signed by the Lions on April 15, 2013. He again played all 16 games for Detroit, finishing with 650 rushing yards and eight rushing touchdowns. Bell also caught 53 passes for 547 yards, as he and teammate Reggie Bush, who had 54 receptions for 506 yards, became the first running back duo in NFL history to both top 500 rushing yards and 500 receiving yards in a season.

On March 11, 2014, Bell signed a two-year, $7 million contract extension with Detroit that included $4.3 million in guaranteed money. Combined with the second-round tender he signed worth $2.187 million, he was under contract for three years and $9.3 million overall.

On February 16, 2016, Bell was released by the Lions.

=== Chicago Bears ===
On September 27, 2016, Bell was signed by the Chicago Bears. On October 24, he was released by the Bears.

=== Detroit Lions (second stint) ===
The Lions re-signed Bell on December 6, 2016, after starting running back Ameer Abdullah suffered a fractured foot.

== NFL career statistics ==
=== Regular season ===
Year	Team	Games	Rushing							Receiving				
Year	Team	GP	Att	Yds	Avg	Lng	TD	Fum	Lost	Rec	Yds	Avg	Lng	TD
2010	PHI	3	-	-	-	-	-	-	-	-	-	-	-	-
2010	IND	5	-	-	-	-	-	-	-	-	-	-	-	-
2012	DET	16	82	414	5.0	67	3	1	1	52	485	9.3	50	0
2013	DET	16	166	650	3.9	20	8	4	3	53	547	10.3	37	0
2014	DET	15	223	860	3.9	57	7	5	1	34	322	9.3	28	1
2015	DET	13	90	311	3.5	36	4	1	0	22	286	13.0	39	0
2016	CHI	4	3	6	2.0	6	0	0	0	0	0	0	0	0
2016	DET	3	0	0	0.0	0	0	0	0	1	-2	-2	-2.0	0
Career		67	564	2,241	4.0	67	22	11	5	162	1,638	10.1	50	1

=== Postseason ===
Year	Team	Games	Rushing					Fumbles	
Year	Team	GP	Att	Yds	Avg	Lng	TD	Fum	Lost
2011	DET	1	0	0	0	0	0	0	0
2014	DET	1	12	43	3.6	11	0	0	0
Career		2	12	43	3.6	11	0	0	0

== Personal life ==
Bell was born August 4, 1986, in Benton Harbor, Michigan, and majored in criminal justice at Wayne State. While a student at Wayne State, Bell worked as a security guard at the Detroit Lions' training camp. Bell graduated with his master's degree in Sports Administration on December 10, 2016. Bell has also appeared on Broadway in the musical Rock of Ages, having been one of several NFL players selected to act for one night in a frequently rotating cameo role.
