= Nate Ness =

American football player (born 1986)

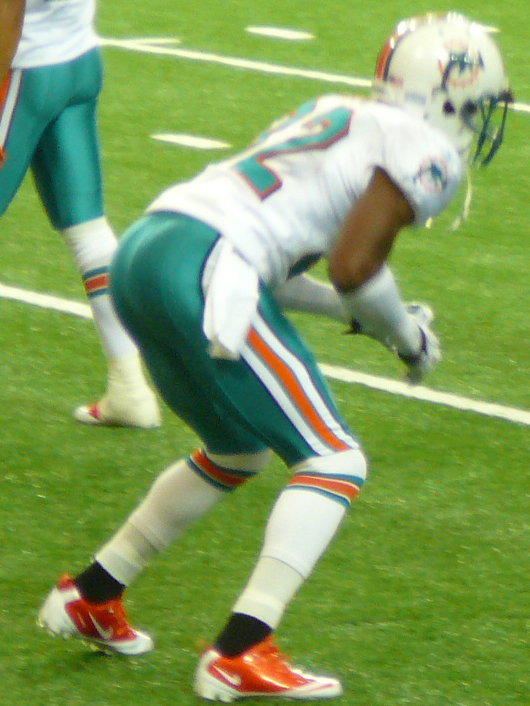
- Ness with the Miami Dolphins in 2011

No. 30, 32, 47
- Position: Safety

Personal information
- Born: September 5, 1986 (age 40); Gardena, California, U.S.
- Listed height: 6 ft 1 in (1.85 m)
- Listed weight: 190 lb (86 kg)

Career information
- High school: Gardena
- College: Arizona
- NFL draft: 2009: undrafted

Career history
- Cleveland Browns (2009)*; New York Jets (2009)*; Seattle Seahawks (2009)*; Miami Dolphins (2009); Seattle Seahawks (2010); Miami Dolphins (2010); Washington Redskins (2011)*; St. Louis Rams (2011); Carolina Panthers (2012); Detroit Lions (2014)
- * Offseason or practice squad member only

Career NFL statistics
- Total tackles: 8
- Stats at Pro Football Reference

Nate Ness (born September 5, 1986) is an American former professional football player who was a safety in the National Football League (NFL). He was signed by the Cleveland Browns as an undrafted free agent in 2009. He played college football for the Arizona Wildcats.

Ness was also a member of the New York Jets, Seattle Seahawks, Miami Dolphins, Washington Redskins, St. Louis Rams, Carolina Panthers, and Detroit Lions.
