= 2015 Pro Bowl =

National Football League all-star game

2015 NFL Pro Bowl
Team Irvin	Team Carter
32	28
Head coach: Jason Garrett (Dallas Cowboys)	Head coach: John Harbaugh (Baltimore Ravens)
	1	2	3	4	Total
Team Irvin	9	10	6	7	32
Team Carter	13	7	8	0	28
- Date: January 25, 2015
- Stadium: University of Phoenix Stadium; Glendale, Arizona
- Offensive MVP: Matthew Stafford (Detroit Lions)
- Defensive MVP: J. J. Watt (Houston Texans)
- Referee: John Parry
- Attendance: 63,225

Ceremonies
- National anthem: Jordin Sparks
- Halftime show: Nico & Vinz

TV in the United States
- Network: ESPN
- Announcers: Mike Tirico, Jon Gruden, & Lisa Salters
- Nielsen ratings: 5.6 (national)

The 2015 Pro Bowl was the National Football League's all-star game for the 2014 season. It began at 6 pm local time on January 25 at University of Phoenix Stadium in Glendale, Arizona, and it was the first Pro Bowl to be held outside Hawaii since 2010. The game was televised nationally by ESPN.

The game continued the "unconferenced" format that was debuted in the 2014 Pro Bowl. The game was the third Pro Bowl that took place in the same site as that year's Super Bowl. It was also the sixth consecutive year where the Pro Bowl took place prior to the Super Bowl.

Hall of Fame wide receivers Cris Carter and Michael Irvin were selected as the alumni captains of the game. Jason Garrett of the Dallas Cowboys and John Harbaugh of the Baltimore Ravens were the game's coaches. The coaches were to come from the teams with the best record in each conference to lose in the Divisional Round of the 2014–15 NFL playoffs, which has been the convention since the 2010 Pro Bowl. However, the Denver Broncos (the Divisional Round loser with the best record in the AFC) and head coach John Fox mutually agreed to part ways following their playoff loss, so Harbaugh (who coached the Ravens, the other Divisional Round loser from the AFC) was selected instead.

== Game format ==
- Two former players drafted players on to the teams. Each were assisted by two player captains and one NFL.com fantasy football champion. Captain Michael Irvin was assisted by player captains DeMarco Murray and Joe Haden while Captain Cris Carter was assisted by player captains J. J. Watt and Antonio Brown.
- A two-minute warning was added to the first and third quarters, plus overtime, and the ball switched hands after every quarter/overtime.
- Teams were given two timeouts per quarter (instead of the customary three timeouts per half) and if a team only used one timeout in the first or third quarter, they could carry their additional timeout to the next quarter. However, timeouts could not carry over from one half to next or into first overtime.
- No kickoffs. A coin toss determined which team is awarded possession first, and the ball was placed on the 25-yard line at the start of each quarter and after scoring plays.
- Goal posts were narrowed from 18 feet wide to 14 feet wide.
- Extra points were attempted from the 15 yard line.
- The rosters consisted of 44 players per squad.
- The defense was permitted to play "cover two" and "press" coverage. In the previous years, only "man" coverage was permitted, except for goal line situations.
- Beginning at the two-minute mark of every quarter/overtime, if the offense did not gain at least one yard, the clock stopped as if the play were an incomplete pass.
- A 35-second and 25-second play clock were used instead of the usual 40-second and 25-second clock.
- The game clock did not stop on quarterback sacks outside the final two minutes of regulation.

== Summary ==
=== Box score ===
2015 Pro Bowl: Team Carter vs. Team Irvin

Quarter	1	2	3	4	Total
Team Carter	13	7	8	0	28
Team Irvin	9	10	6	7	32

at University of Phoenix Stadium in Glendale, Arizona

- Date: January 25, 2015
- Game time: 8:00 p.m. EST / 6:00 p.m. MST
- Game weather: 73 °F (23 °C), clear (retractable roof open)
- Game attendance: 63,225
- Referee: John Parry
- TV announcers (ESPN): Mike Tirico (play-by-play), Jon Gruden (color commentator), and Lisa Salters (sideline reporter)
- Recap, Gamebook

Game information

First quarter

- IRV – A. Vinatieri 32 Yard Field Goal. Team Irvin 3–0
- CRT – A.Luck 17 Yard Pass to G.Olsen (C.Parkey extra point is good). Team Carter 7–3
- IRV – M.Stafford 10 Yard Pass to E.Sanders (A. Vinatieri extra point failed). Team Irvin 9–7
- CRT – A.Luck 14 Yard Pass to T.Hilton 0:34 (2-point pass conversion failed). Team Carter 13–9

Second quarter

- IRV – M.Stafford 6 Yard Pass to J.Graham (A.Vinatieri extra point is good). Team Irvin 16–13
- IRV – A.Vinatieri 28 Yard Field Goal. Team Irvin 19–13
- CRT – D.Brees 21 Yard Pass to J.Nelson (C.Parkey extra point is good). Team Carter 20–19

Third quarter

- CRT – G.Olsen 10 yd. pass from D.Brees (D.Brees-T.Hilton pass is good). Team Carter 28–19
- IRV – E.Sanders 1 yd. pass from M.Ryan (A.Vinatieri extra point failed). Team Carter 28–25

Fourth quarter

- IRV – J.Graham 1 yd. pass from M.Ryan 3:10 (A.Vinatieri kick is good). Team Irvin 32–28

Top passers

- CRT – D.Brees – 13/21, 163 yards, 2 TD, INT
- IRV – M.Stafford – 15/25, 316 yards, 2 TD, INT

Top rushers

- CRT – J.Forsett – 3 rushes, 31 yards
- IRV – M.Ingram II – 11 rushes, 72 yards

Top receivers

- CRT – A.Brown – 6 rec, 98 yards
- IRV – G.Tate – 2 rec, 98 yards

== Roster ==
=== Team Carter ===
Team Carter
Quarterbacks: 9 Drew Brees ^{[a]}; 12 Andrew Luck; 14 Andy Dalton ^{[a]}; Running Backs: 25 Jamaal Charles; 29 Justin Forsett ^{[a]}; 46 Alfred Morris ^{[a]}; 30 John Kuhn FB; Wide Receivers: 13 T. Y. Hilton; 18 A. J. Green; 84 Antonio Brown (C); 87 Jordy Nelson; Tight Ends: 83 Martellus Bennett ^{[a]}; 88 Greg Olsen; Offensive Tackles: 74 Joe Staley; 76 Duane Brown ^{[a]}; 78 Ryan Clady; Offensive Guards: 51 Mike Pouncey ^{[a]}; 69 Evan Mathis ^{[a]}; 71 Josh Sitton	Centers: 53 Maurkice Pouncey; 62 Jason Kelce; Defensive Ends: 93 Calais Campbell; 94 Mario Williams; 99 J. J. Watt (C); Defensive Tackles: 92 Dontari Poe; 95 Kyle Williams; 99 Marcell Dareus; Outside Linebackers: 50 Justin Houston; 91 Tamba Hali; 98 Connor Barwin; Inside Linebackers: 57 C. J. Mosley; 94 Lawrence Timmons; Cornerbacks: 21 Patrick Peterson; 21 Aqib Talib; 31 Antonio Cromartie ^{[a]}; 37 Sam Shields ^{[a]}	Safeties: 27 Glover Quin; 31 Donte Whitner ^{[a]}; 41 Antoine Bethea ^{[a]}; Punter: 1 Pat McAfee; Placekicker: 1 Cody Parkey ^{[a]}; Return specialist: 17 Devin Hester; Long snapper: 91 L. P. Ladouceur; Special teamer: 28 Justin Bethel

=== Team Irvin ===
Team Irvin
Quarterbacks: 2 Matt Ryan ^{[a]}; 9 Tony Romo ^{[a]}; 9 Matthew Stafford ^{[a]}; Running Backs: 22 C. J. Anderson ^{[a]}; 22 Mark Ingram II ^{[a]}; 29 DeMarco Murray (C); 45 Marcel Reece FB; Wide Receivers: 10 Emmanuel Sanders ^{[a]}; 13 Odell Beckham Jr. ^{[a]}; 15 Golden Tate ^{[a]}; 18 Randall Cobb ^{[a]}; Tight Ends: 80 Jimmy Graham; 82 Jason Witten ^{[a]}; Offensive Tackles: 71 Trent Williams; 73 Joe Thomas; 77 Tyron Smith; Offensive Guards: 70 Zack Martin; 73 Marshal Yanda; 75 Kyle Long	Centers: 72 Travis Frederick; 74 Nick Mangold; Defensive Ends: 91 Cameron Wake; 94 Robert Quinn; 94 DeMarcus Ware; Defensive Tackles: 91 Sheldon Richardson ^{[a]}; 97 Geno Atkins ^{[a]}; 99 Aaron Donald; Outside Linebackers: 52 Clay Matthews III; 58 Elvis Dumervil; 58 Von Miller; Inside Linebackers: 52 D'Qwell Jackson ^{[a]}; 59 Luke Kuechly; Cornerbacks: 21 Vontae Davis; 21 Brent Grimes; 23 Joe Haden (C); 25 Chris Harris, Jr.	Safeties: 29 Mike Adams ^{[a]}; 32 Eric Weddle; 43 T. J. Ward; Punter: 10 Kevin Huber; Placekicker: 4 Adam Vinatieri; Return specialist: 43 Darren Sproles; Long snapper: 46 Jon Dorenbos; Special teamer: 25 Darrell Stuckey ^{[a]}

=== Selected and/or chosen but did not participate ===
Quarterbacks: 3 Russell Wilson ^{[c]}; 5 Joe Flacco ^{[d]}; 7 Ben Roethlisberger ^{[b]}; 12 Tom Brady ^{[c]}; 12 Aaron Rodgers ^{[b]}; 18 Peyton Manning ^{[b]}; Running Backs: 23 Arian Foster ^{[b]}; 24 Marshawn Lynch ^{[c]}; 25 LeSean McCoy ^{[b]}; 26 Le'Veon Bell ^{[b]}; Wide Receivers: 11 Julio Jones ^{[b]}; 18 Jeremy Maclin ^{[a]}^{[b]}; 81 Calvin Johnson ^{[b]}; 88 Dez Bryant ^{[b]}; 88 Demaryius Thomas ^{[b]}	Tight Ends: 80 Julius Thomas ^{[b]}; 87 Rob Gronkowski ^{[c]}; Offensive Tackles: 71 Jason Peters ^{[b]}; Offensive Guards: 73 Jahri Evans ^{[b]}; 77 Mike Iupati ^{[b]}; Defensive Tackles: 90 Ndamukong Suh ^{[b]}; 93 Gerald McCoy ^{[b]}; Inside Linebackers: 54 Bobby Wagner ^{[c]}	Cornerbacks: 24 Darrelle Revis ^{[c]}; 25 Richard Sherman ^{[c]}; Safeties: 29 Earl Thomas ^{[c]}; 31 Kam Chancellor ^{[c]}; 39 Tashaun Gipson ^{[b]}; Placekicker: 3 Stephen Gostkowski ^{[c]}; Special teamer: 18 Matthew Slater ^{[c]}

Notes:

(C) signifies the player was selected as a captain
^{a} Replacement selection due to injury or vacancy
^{b} Injured player; selected but will not participate
^{c} Selected but did not play because his team advanced to Super Bowl XLIX (see Pro Bowl "Player Selection" section)
^{d} Was invited, but declined; pro-bowl selection does not count because of it

== Number of selections per team ==
American Football Conference
Team	Selections
Denver Broncos	11
Indianapolis Colts	7
New England Patriots	5
Pittsburgh Steelers	5
Baltimore Ravens	4
Cincinnati Bengals	4
Cleveland Browns	4
Kansas City Chiefs	4
Buffalo Bills	3
Houston Texans	3
Miami Dolphins	3
New York Jets	2
San Diego Chargers	2
Oakland Raiders	1
Jacksonville Jaguars	0
Tennessee Titans	0

National Football Conference
Team	Selections
Philadelphia Eagles	9
Dallas Cowboys	8
Green Bay Packers	7
Seattle Seahawks	5
Detroit Lions	5
Arizona Cardinals	4
New Orleans Saints	4
Atlanta Falcons	3
San Francisco 49ers	3
Carolina Panthers	2
Chicago Bears	2
St. Louis Rams	2
Washington Redskins	2
New York Giants	1
Tampa Bay Buccaneers	1
Minnesota Vikings	0
