= Nate Freese =

American football player (born 1990)

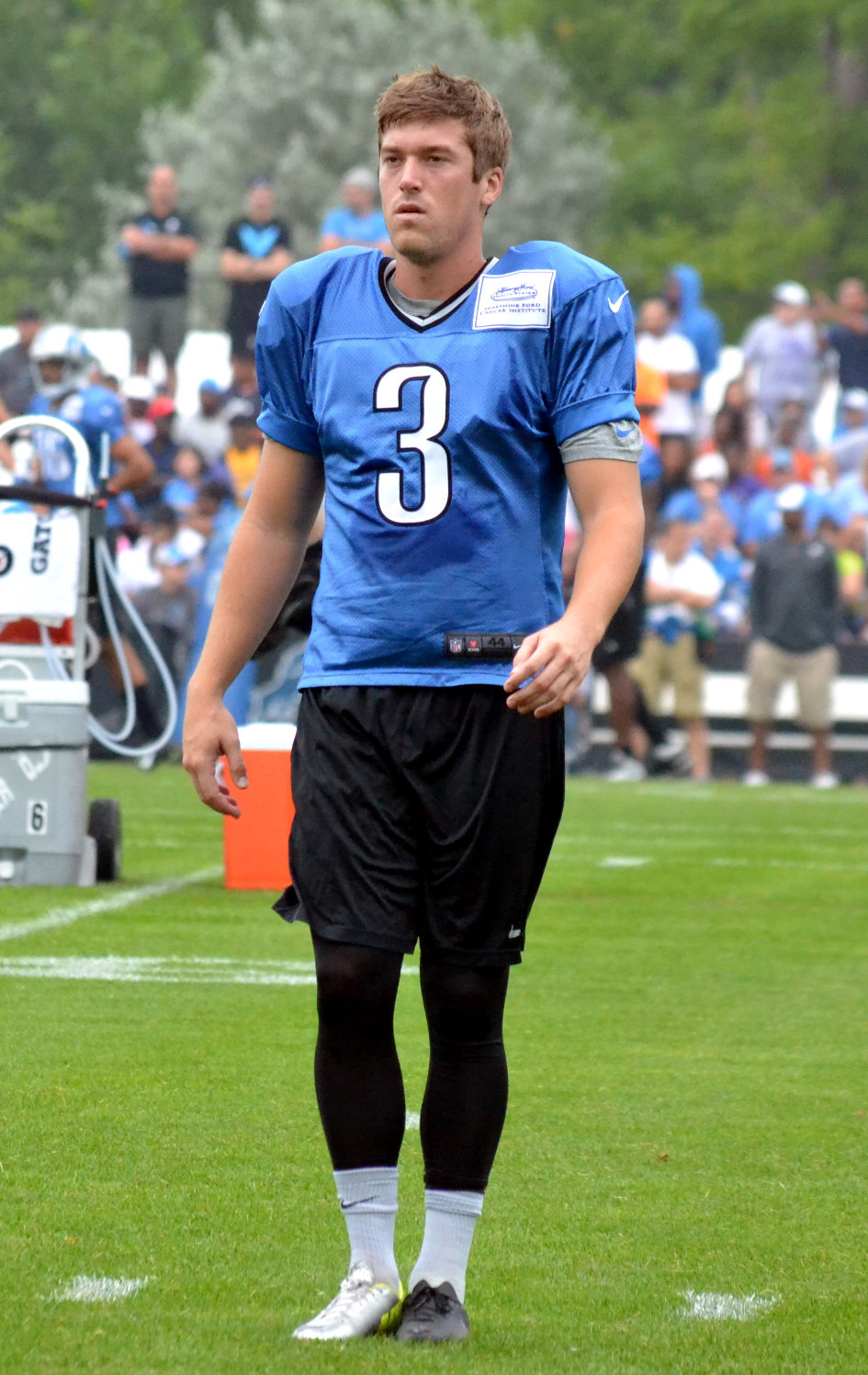
- Freese with the Detroit Lions in 2014

No. 3
- Position: Placekicker

Personal information
- Born: August 18, 1990 (age 36); Strongsville, Ohio, U.S.
- Listed height: 5 ft 11 in (1.80 m)
- Listed weight: 192 lb (87 kg)

Career information
- High school: Strongsville
- College: Boston College (2009–2013)
- NFL draft: 2014: 7th round, 229th overall pick

Career history
- Detroit Lions (2014)

Awards and highlights
- First-team All-ACC (2013)

Career NFL statistics
- Field goals made: 3
- Field goals attempted: 7
- Field goal %: 42.9
- Longest field goal: 30
- Stats at Pro Football Reference

Nathan A. Freese (born August 18, 1990) is an American former professional football player who was a placekicker in the National Football League (NFL). He was selected by the Detroit Lions in the seventh round of the 2014 NFL draft. He played college football for the Boston College Eagles.

== College career ==
Freese attended and played college football at Boston College as a placekicker. He converted 114 of 117 extra point attempts and 70 of 81 field goal attempts in his college career.

== Professional career ==
Freese was selected by the Detroit Lions in the seventh round (229th overall) of the 2014 NFL draft. During the 2014 training camp for the Lions, Freese won the placekicker role over Giorgio Tavecchio. However, Freese struggled in the regular season and after going 3-for-7 on field goals in his first three games, he released by the Lions on September 22, 2014.
