= Kourtnei Brown =

American football player (born 1988)

No. 48, 91
- Position: Linebacker

Personal information
- Born: April 17, 1988 (age 38); Charlotte, North Carolina, U.S.
- Listed height: 6 ft 4 in (1.93 m)
- Listed weight: 253 lb (115 kg)

Career information
- High school: Victory Christian Center (Charlotte)
- College: Clemson
- NFL draft: 2012: undrafted

Career history
- San Francisco 49ers (2012)*; Washington Redskins (2012)*; Buffalo Bills (2013)*; Buffalo Bills (2014)*; Detroit Lions (2014)*; St. Louis Rams (2014)*; Houston Texans (2014–2015)*; Spokane Shock (2015)*; Tampa Bay Buccaneers (2015); Houston Texans (2015); Tampa Bay Buccaneers (2015); Tampa Bay Buccaneers (2016)*; Tennessee Titans (2016–2017)*; BC Lions (2017)
- * Offseason or practice squad member only

Career NFL statistics
- Total tackles: 2
- Stats at Pro Football Reference
- Stats at ArenaFan.com

Kourtnei Brown (born April 17, 1988) is an American former professional football player who was a linebacker in the National Football League (NFL). He played college football for the Clemson Tigers.

== Professional career ==
=== San Francisco 49ers ===
In 2012 Brown was signed as an undrafted free agent, but a short time later he was released.

=== Washington Redskins ===
Later in 2012 Brown was signed by the Redskins' practice squad.

=== Buffalo Bills ===
In 2013 Brown was signed to the Bills' practice squad. On January 14, 2014, he was signed a future contract. On April 10, 2014, he was waived.

=== Detroit Lions ===
On April 11, 2014, Brown was claimed off waivers from the Bills. On May 30, 2014, he was waived by the Lions.

=== St. Louis Rams ===
On July 26, 2014, Brown was signed by the Rams. On August 30, 2014, he was waived. On September 11, 2014, he was signed to the Rams' practice squad. On September 30, 2014, he was released.

=== Houston Texans ===
On December 10, 2014, Brown was signed by the Texans' practice squad. On December 29, 2014, he was signed a future contract. On September 5, 2015, he was waived. This came after he appeared on the Texans' edition of Hard Knocks that summer.

=== Tampa Bay Buccaneers ===
On September 6, 2015, Brown was claimed off waivers from the Texans. On September 22, 2015, he was waived. On September 24, 2015, he was signed to the Buccaneers' practice squad.

=== Houston Texans (second stint) ===
On September 30, 2015, Brown was signed from the Buccaneers' practice squad. On November 21, 2015, he was waived.

=== Tampa Bay Buccaneers (second stint) ===
On November 23, 2015, Brown was acquired off waivers from the Texans. On September 3, 2016, he was released by the Buccaneers as part of final roster cuts. He was re-signed to the practice squad on November 15, 2016. He was released on November 29, 2016.

=== Tennessee Titans ===
On December 28, 2016, Brown was signed to the Titans' practice squad. He signed a reserve/future contract with the Titans on January 2, 2017. He was waived/injured on August 17, 2017, and placed on injured reserve. He was released on August 24, 2017.
