= D. J. Morrell =

American football player (born 1991)

No. 73
- Position: Offensive guard

Personal information
- Born: August 19, 1991 (age 35)
- Listed height: 6 ft 6 in (1.98 m)
- Listed weight: 325 lb (147 kg)

Career information
- High school: Norwalk (CT)
- College: Old Dominion
- NFL draft: 2014: undrafted

Career history
- Detroit Lions (2014)*; St. Louis Rams (2014)*; Buffalo Bills (2014–2015)*
- * Offseason or practice squad member only
- Stats at Pro Football Reference

D. J. Morrell (born August 19, 1991) is an American former football offensive guard. He was most recently a member of the Buffalo Bills.
