= Larry Webster III =

American football player (born 1990)

Larry Webster
No. 75
- Position: Defensive end

Personal information
- Born: February 14, 1990 (age 36); Hagerstown, Maryland, U.S.
- Listed height: 6 ft 6 in (1.98 m)
- Listed weight: 252 lb (114 kg)

Career information
- High school: Elkton (MD)
- College: Bloomsburg
- NFL draft: 2014: 4th round, 136th overall pick

Career history
- Detroit Lions (2014–2015); Carolina Panthers (2016); Tampa Bay Buccaneers (2017)*; Winnipeg Blue Bombers (2018)*
- * Offseason or practice squad member only

Career NFL statistics
- Total tackles: 1
- Stats at Pro Football Reference

Larry Melvin Webster III (born February 14, 1990) is an American former professional football player who was a defensive end in the National Football League (NFL). He was selected by the Detroit Lions in the fourth round of the 2014 NFL draft. He played college football for the Bloomsburg Huskies. Webster is the son of former NFL defensive tackle Larry Webster Jr.

== College career ==
On January 8, Webster was selected to the 2012 Don Hansen NCAA Division II All-Super Region One team following his Junior season. On January 13, he was selected to the All-Pennsylvania State Athletic Conference (PSAC) Eastern Division first-team after the season. On January 17, 2013, Webster was selected as an honorable mention on the 2012 D2Football.com All-America Team. On January 30, 2013, he was selected to the 2012 Don Hansen NCAA Division II All-America Team.

On November 18, 2013, Webster was named the Beyond Sports Network Defensive Athlete of the Week for his performance. On December 5, 2013, he was selected to the All-Super Region One first-team by Daktronics. On December 12, 2013, he was finished as a finalist for the Cliff Harris Award. On January 19, 2014, Webster was selected to the All-PSAC first-team following his senior season. On January 21, 2014, he was selected to the Don Hansen Football Gazette NCAA Division II All-American third-team. On January 11, 2014, he was selected and participated in the 2014 East-West Shrine Game and was on the West team. Webster finished college at Bloomsburg playing four seasons in basketball, and only two seasons of football in which he recorded 88 tackles, 26 sacks, 3 forced fumbles and one interception.

== Professional career ==
Pre-draft measurables
Height	Weight	Arm length	Hand span	40-yard dash	20-yard shuttle	Three-cone drill	Vertical jump	Bench press
6 ft 6 in (1.98 m)	252 lb (114 kg)	33 1/2 in (0.85 m)	10 1/8 in (0.26 m)	4.58 s	3.98 s	7.29 s	36.5 in (0.93 m)	17 reps
All values from NFL Combine

=== Detroit Lions ===
Webster was selected by the Detroit Lions in the fourth round (136th overall) of the 2014 NFL draft.

On September 5, 2015, the Lions waived him.

=== Carolina Panthers ===
The Carolina Panthers signed Webster to a futures contract on January 12, 2016. On September 3, 2016, he was waived by the Panthers as part of final roster cuts. The next day he was signed to the Panthers' practice squad. He was promoted to the active roster on October 1, 2016 but was released two days later and re-signed to the practice squad. He was promoted to the active roster on December 27, 2016.

On September 2, 2017, Webster was waived by the Panthers.

=== Tampa Bay Buccaneers ===
On October 10, 2017, Webster was signed to the Tampa Bay Buccaneers' practice squad. He was released on October 24, 2017.

=== Winnipeg Blue Bombers ===
Webster signed with the Winnipeg Blue Bombers of the Canadian Football League on May 1, 2018. He was released on May 25, 2018.

== Personal life ==
Webster is the son of Larry Webster and Melissa Webster. His father, Larry played in the NFL for 11 seasons for four teams. He grew up in Elkton, Maryland
