= Teryl Austin =

American football player and coach (born 1965)

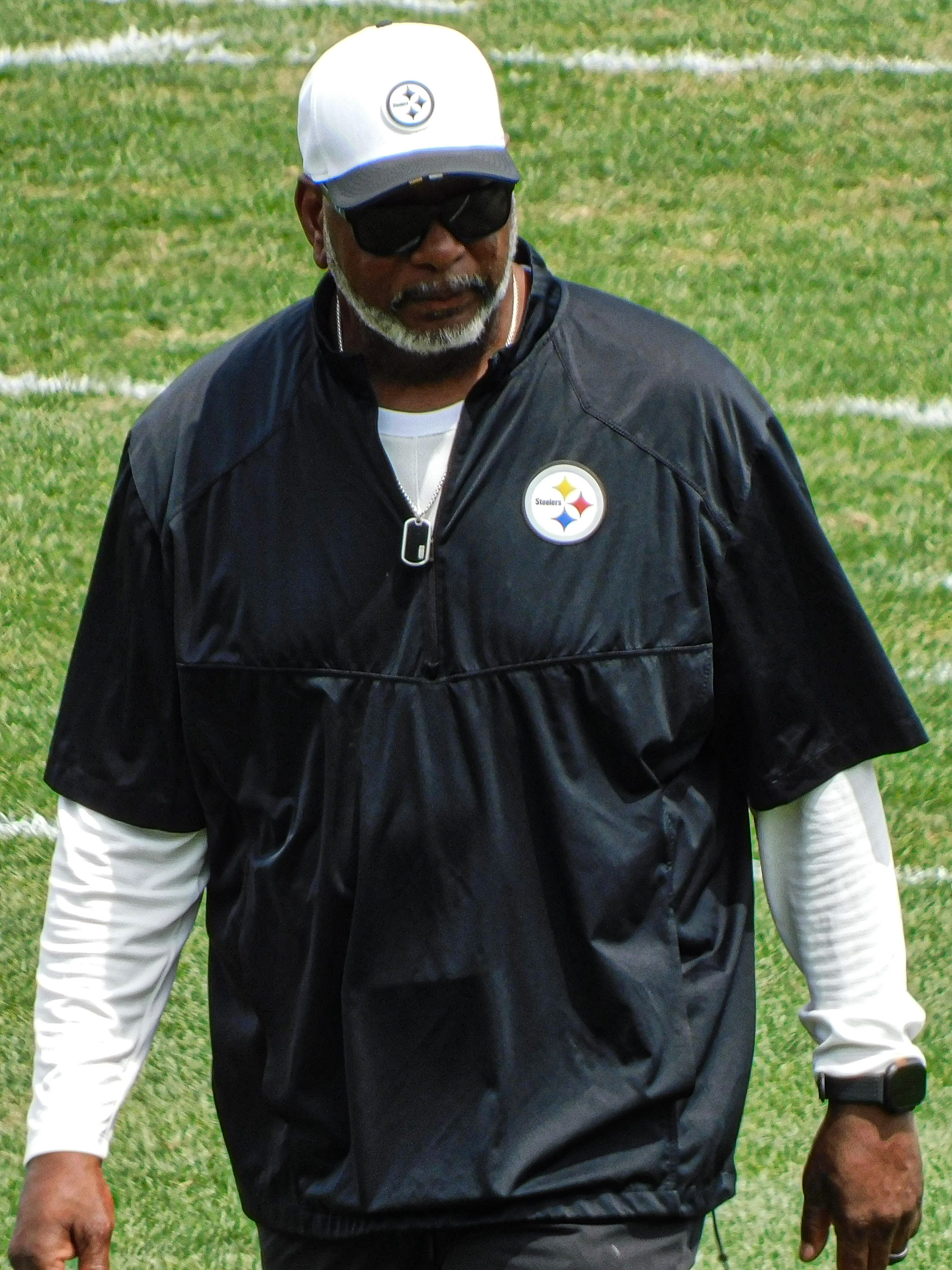
- Austin with the Pittsburgh Steelers in 2025

Arizona Cardinals
- Title: Senior defensive assistant

Personal information
- Born: March 3, 1965 (age 61); Sharon, Pennsylvania, U.S.

Career information
- Position: Cornerback (No. 22)
- High school: Sharon (PA)
- College: Pittsburgh
- NFL draft: 1988: undrafted

Career history

Playing
- Washington Redskins (1988)*; Hamilton Tiger-Cats (1989)*; Montreal Machine (1991)
- * Offseason or practice squad member only

Coaching
- Penn State (1991–1992) Graduate assistant; Wake Forest (1993–1995) Defensive backs coach; Syracuse (1996–1998) Defensive assistant; Michigan (1999–2002) Defensive assistant; Seattle Seahawks (2003–2006) Defensive backs coach; Arizona Cardinals (2007–2009) Defensive backs coach; Florida (2010) Defensive coordinator; Baltimore Ravens (2011–2013) Secondary coach; Detroit Lions (2014–2017) Defensive coordinator; Cincinnati Bengals (2018) Defensive coordinator; Pittsburgh Steelers (2019–2021) Senior defensive assistant & secondary coach; Pittsburgh Steelers (2022–2025) Defensive coordinator; Arizona Cardinals (2026–present) Senior defensive assistant

Awards and highlights
- Super Bowl champion (XLVII)
- Coaching profile at Pro Football Reference

Teryl Austin (born March 3, 1965) is an American professional football coach who is the senior defensive assistant for the Arizona Cardinals. He was previously the defensive coordinator for the Detroit Lions from 2014 to 2017, the Cincinnati Bengals in 2018, and the Pittsburgh Steelers from 2022 to 2025.

== Early life ==
Austin was born in Sharon, Pennsylvania. He played college football at the University of Pittsburgh from 1984 to 1987, where he was a four-year letterman and three-year starter. He played in the 1987 Bluebonnet Bowl. Austin played one season with the Montreal Machine of the World League of American Football in 1991.

== Coaching career ==
Austin then began a career in coaching, landing a position as a graduate assistant at Penn State in 1991. In 1993, he accompanied fellow Penn State assistant Jim Caldwell to Wake Forest where he served as secondary coach. Austin went on to serve on the coaching staffs at Syracuse and Michigan before joining the Seattle Seahawks' staff in 2003, helping Seattle advance to Super Bowl XL in 2006.

He joined the Arizona Cardinals coaching staff as coach of defensive backs in 2007. In 2009, he helped the team reach Super Bowl XLIII, where the Cardinals would lose to the Pittsburgh Steelers in the Super Bowl.

On February 12, 2010, it was announced that Austin had been hired as the defensive coordinator for the Florida Gators. His tenure as defensive coordinator ended following the Gators' 37–24 victory over the Penn State Nittany Lions in the 2011 Outback Bowl, and head coach Urban Meyer's resignation in December 2010.

On January 26, 2011, it was announced that Austin had been hired as the secondary coach for the Baltimore Ravens, and helped lead them to a Super Bowl victory over the San Francisco 49ers.

On January 16, 2014, it was announced that Austin had been hired as the defensive coordinator for the Detroit Lions. With Austin calling the defensive signals, the Lions finished second in the NFL in points against and total yards against, leading the franchise to an 11–5 record and wild card playoff berth. Following the end of the Lions season, Austin interviewed the Atlanta Falcons, Buffalo Bills, Chicago Bears, and San Francisco 49ers for vacant head coaching jobs. Austin was scheduled to interview with the Denver Broncos but withdrew from consideration. In the 2015 NFL season, the Lions record fell to 7–9 and the defense dropped to 18th in total yards against and 23 in total points against. Despite this, Austin was still considered a top head coaching candidate and interviewed with the Cleveland Browns, New York Giants, Philadelphia Eagles and Tennessee Titans. Austin later said that he felt of the jobs he interviewed for following the 2015 season, that he felt that only two were "...like a legitimate job interview. Like I had a legitimate shot at the job." When asked if he felt the other interviews were just to satisfy the NFL's "Rooney Rule," he did not disagree with the statement. Following the 2016 NFL season, Austin interviewed with the Los Angeles Rams and San Diego Chargers.

After missing the 2017 NFL playoffs the Lions fired head coach Jim Caldwell. Following Caldwell's dismissal, Austin interviewed with the Lions for the vacant head coaching position.

On January 11, 2018, it was announced that Austin had been hired as the defensive coordinator for the Cincinnati Bengals. On November 12, 2018, Teryl Austin was relieved of his duties as defensive coordinator after the Bengals defense became the first in NFL history to give up 500+ yards in 3 straight games, against the Kansas City Chiefs, Tampa Bay Buccaneers, and New Orleans Saints, respectively.

On January 8, 2019, it was announced that Austin had been hired as the Senior Defensive Assistant/Secondary for the Pittsburgh Steelers. On February 9, 2022, he was promoted as the defensive coordinator for the Steelers after the retirement of Keith Butler.

On March 6, 2026, it was announced that Austin had joined the Arizona Cardinals as a senior assistant.
