= 2015 Detroit Lions season =

NFL team season

- Owner: Martha Firestone Ford
- General manager: Martin Mayhew (fired Nov. 5); Sheldon White (interim)
- Head coach: Jim Caldwell
- Offensive coordinator: Joe Lombardi
- Defensive coordinator: Teryl Austin
- Home stadium: Ford Field

Results
- Record: 7–9
- Division place: 3rd NFC North
- Playoffs: Did not qualify
- Pro Bowlers: Ezekiel Ansah, DE; Calvin Johnson, WR

Uniform
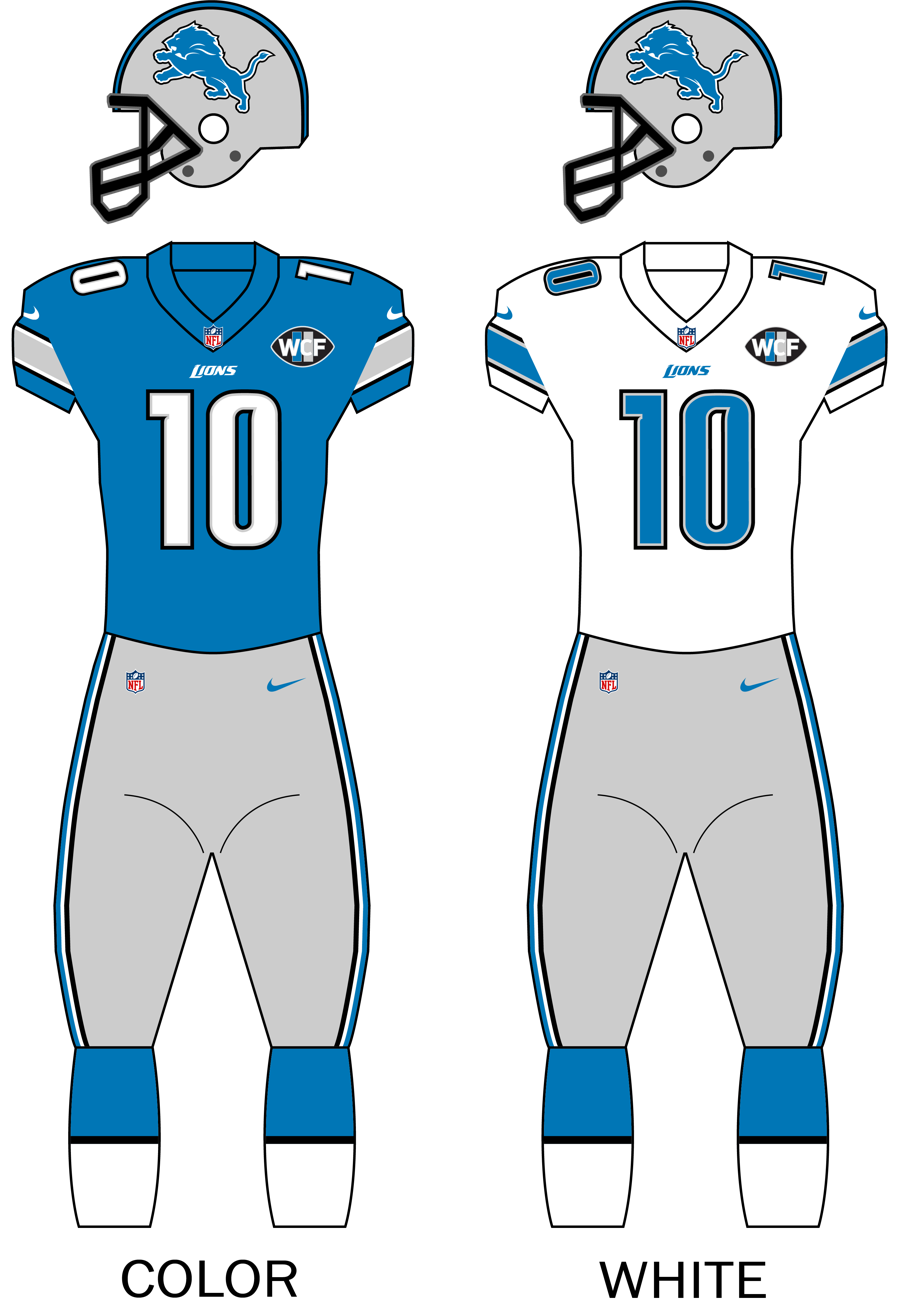

The 2015 season was the Detroit Lions' 86th in the National Football League (NFL), their 82nd as the Detroit Lions and their second under head coach Jim Caldwell. By Week 7 of the season, the Lions had already lost six games, more than they did in the entire 2014 season. This led to the firing of offensive coordinator Joe Lombardi and two other coaches. After falling to 1–7 the following week, the team fired president Tom Lewand and general manager Martin Mayhew. On November 19, the Lions named Rod Wood as team president. The Lions were eliminated from playoff contention after their loss to the St. Louis Rams in week 14. The team had a 6–2 record in the second half of the season to finish at 7–9, good for third place in the NFC North. One highlight of the season was the Lions beating the Green Bay Packers at Lambeau Field for the first time since 1991.

== Offseason ==
=== Re-signings ===
Date	Player	Position	Contract	Source
February 27	Don Muhlbach	Long snapper	1 year / $1.05 million	
March 2	Dan Orlovsky	Quarterback	1 year / $1.05 million	
March 2	Darryl Tapp	Defensive end	1 year / $950,000	
March 6	Matt Prater	Placekicker	3 years / $9 million	
March 6	Kellen Moore	Quarterback	2 years / $1.825 million	
March 10	Josh Bynes	Linebacker	2 years / $1.81 million	
March 11	Isa Abdul-Quddus	Safety	1 year / $1.5 million	
March 19	Rashean Mathis	Cornerback	2 years / $3.5 million	
April 20	Jeremy Ross	Return specialist	1 year / $585,000	
August 5	DeAndre Levy	Linebacker	4 years / $33.72 million	

=== Arrivals ===
Date	Player	Position	Previous team	Contract	Source
February 27	Phillip Hunt	Defensive end	Indianapolis Colts	1 year / $585,000	
March 12	Tyrunn Walker	Defensive end	New Orleans Saints	1 year / $1.75 million	
April 3	Josh Wilson	Cornerback	Atlanta Falcons	1 year / $950,000	
April 7	Brandon Copeland	Linebacker	Tennessee Titans	1 year / $460,000	
May 2	Al Bond	Guard	Memphis	Undrafted FA	
May 2	Anthony Boone	Quarterback	Duke	Undrafted FA	
May 2	Kyle Brindza	Placekicker	Notre Dame	Undrafted FA	
May 2	Isaiah Johnson	Safety	Georgia Tech	Undrafted FA	
May 2	Vernon Johnson	Wide receiver	Texas A&M	Undrafted FA	
May 2	Desmond Lawrence	Wide receiver	North Carolina A&T	Undrafted FA	
May 2	Casey Pierce	Tight end	Kent State	Undrafted FA	
May 2	Kevin Snyder	Linebacker	Rutgers	Undrafted FA	
May 2	Brian Suite	Safety	Utah State	Undrafted FA	
May 2	Rasheed Williams	Running back	Alfred State	Undrafted FA	
May 2	Torrian Wilson	Offensive lineman	Central Florida	Undrafted FA	
May 2	Zach Zenner	Running back	South Dakota State	Undrafted FA	
May 8	Alex Carter	Cornerback	Stanford	4 years / $3.058 million	
May 8	Gabe Wright	Defensive tackle	Auburn	4 years / $2.801 million	
May 8	Michael Burton	Fullback	Rutgers	4 years / $2.46 million	
May 8	Quandre Diggs	Cornerback	Texas	4 years / $2.395 million	
May 8	Corey Robinson	Offensive tackle	South Carolina	4 years / $2.338 million	
May 11	Jarred Haggins	Wide receiver	Florida State	3 years / $1.575 million	
May 11	Nathan Lindsey	Safety	Fort Hays State	1 year / –	
May 11	Erik Lora	Wide receiver	Eastern Illinois	1 year / –	
May 12	Desmond Martin	Running back	Wayne State	3 years / $1.575 million	
May 12	Lance Moore	Wide receiver	Pittsburgh Steelers	1 year / $1.05 million	
May 13	Greg Salas	Wide receiver	New York Jets	1 year / $745,000	
May 13	Chris Owens	Cornerback	Kansas City Chiefs	1 year / –	
May 13	Ameer Abdullah	Running back	Nebraska	4 years / $4.156 million	
June 10	David Ausberry	Tight end	Oakland Raiders	1 year / $660,000	
June 11	Laken Tomlinson	Guard	Duke	4 years / $8.55 million	
June 15	Garrett Gilbert	Quarterback	New England Patriots	1 year / –	
June 22	Taylor Mays	Safety	Minnesota Vikings	1 year / $745,000	
July 28	R. J. Stanford	Cornerback	Miami Dolphins	1 year / –	
August 4	Ethan Davis	Cornerback	Troy	1 year / –	

=== Departures ===
Date	Player	Position	Note	New Team	Source
February 25	Reggie Bush	Running back	Released	San Francisco 49ers	
March 11	Ndamukong Suh	Defensive tackle	UFA	Miami Dolphins	
March 12	Jed Collins	Fullback	UFA	Dallas Cowboys	
March 13	Nick Fairley	Defensive tackle	UFA	St. Louis Rams	
April 21	Rodney Austin	Guard	Released		
May 11	Desmond Lawrence	Wide receiver	Released		
May 12	Rasheed Williams	Running back	Released		
May 13	Skye Dawson	Wide receiver	Released	Edmonton Eskimos (CFL)	
June 3	Erik Lora	Wide receiver	Released		
June 10	Nathan Lindsey	Defensive back	Released		
June 12	Anthony Boone	Quarterback	Released	Montreal Alouettes (CFL)	
June 17	Rasheed Williams	Running back	Released		
August 4	Jerrell Harris	Linebacker	Released		
August 8	Ethan Davis	Cornerback	Waived		

=== Trades ===
- On March 10, the Lions traded their fourth and fifth-round picks to the Baltimore Ravens in exchange for defensive tackle Haloti Ngata and a seventh-round pick.
- On April 15, the Lions traded defensive end George Johnson and a seventh-round pick to the Tampa Bay Buccaneers in exchange for a fifth-round pick.
- On August 3, the Lions traded Mohammed Seisay to the Seattle Seahawks in exchange for a sixth-round pick in the 2016 NFL draft.

=== Draft ===
2015 Detroit Lions Draft
Round	Selection	Player	Position	College
1	28	Laken Tomlinson	G	Duke
2	54	Ameer Abdullah	RB	Nebraska
3	80	Alex Carter	CB	Stanford
4	113	Gabe Wright	DT	Auburn
5	168	Michael Burton	FB	Rutgers
6	200	Quandre Diggs	CB	Texas
7	240	Corey Robinson	OT	South Carolina

Notes

- The Lions traded their fourth and fifth-round selections (Nos. 122 and 158 overall, respectively) to the Baltimore Ravens in exchange for defensive tackle Haloti Ngata and the Ravens' seventh-round selection (No. 231 overall).
- The Lions traded defensive end George Johnson and their seventh-round selection (No. 231 overall) to the Tampa Bay Buccaneers in exchange for a fifth-round selection (No. 168 overall).
- The Lions traded their first-round selection (No. 23 overall) to the Denver Broncos in exchange for Denver's 2015 first and fifth-round selections (Nos. 28 and 143 overall, respectively), their fifth-round selection in the 2016 NFL draft, and guard Manny Ramirez.
- The Lions traded their third and fifth-round selections (Nos. 88 and 143 overall, respectively) to the Minnesota Vikings in exchange for a third-round selection (No. 80 overall).
- The Lions traded their third-round selection in the 2016 NFL draft to the Philadelphia Eagles in exchange for a fourth-round selection (No. 113 overall).

== Final roster ==
2015 Detroit Lions roster
Quarterbacks (QB): 8 Dan Orlovsky; 9 Matthew Stafford; Running backs (RB): 21 Ameer Abdullah; 35 Joique Bell; 46 Michael Burton FB; 25 Theo Riddick; 38 George Winn; Wide receivers (WR): 10 Corey Fuller; 81 Calvin Johnson; 13 T. J. Jones; 16 Lance Moore; 15 Golden Tate; Tight ends (TE): 85 Eric Ebron; 80 Bear Pascoe; 83 Tim Wright	Offensive linemen (OL): 60 Braxston Cave C; 65 Gabe Ikard C; 77 Cornelius Lucas T; 74 Michael Ola T; 63 Manny Ramirez G/C; 71 Riley Reiff T; 70 Corey Robinson T; 72 Laken Tomlinson G; 75 Larry Warford G; Defensive linemen (DL): 94 Ezekiel Ansah DE; 99 Jermelle Cudjo DT; 61 Kerry Hyder DE; 91 Jason Jones DE; 92 Haloti Ngata DT; 97 Caraun Reid DT; 52 Darryl Tapp DE; 98 Devin Taylor DE; 67 Khyri Thornton DT; 78 C. J. Wilson DE; 90 Gabe Wright DT	Linebackers (LB): 57 Josh Bynes OLB; 95 Brandon Copeland OLB; 50 Travis Lewis; 53 Kyle Van Noy OLB; 59 Tahir Whitehead OLB; 55 Stephen Tulloch MLB; Defensive backs (DB): 42 Isa Abdul-Quddus SS; 29 Crezdon Butler CB; 26 Don Carey FS; 28 Quandre Diggs CB; 32 James Ihedigbo SS; 43 Isaiah Johnson SS; 24 Nevin Lawson CB; 27 Glover Quin FS; 23 Darius Slay CB; Special teams (ST): 6 Sam Martin P; 48 Don Muhlbach LS; 5 Matt Prater K	Practice squad: 49 Khaseem Greene OLB; 36 Kendall James CB; 86 Casey Pierce TE; 18 Ryan Spadola WR; 2 Ricky Stanzi QB; 73 Tyrus Thompson T; 19 Corey Washington WR; 79 Larry Webster DE; Reserve: 33 Alex Carter CB (IR); 68 Darren Keyton C (IR); 54 DeAndre Levy OLB (IR); 31 Rashean Mathis CB (IR); 87 Brandon Pettigrew TE (IR); 64 Travis Swanson C (IR); 82 Jordan Thompson TE (IR); 93 Tyrunn Walker DT (IR); 30 Josh Wilson CB (IR); 99 Corey Wootton DE (IR); 34 Zach Zenner RB (IR); Rookies in italics 53 active, 11 reserve, 8 practice squad

== Schedule ==
=== Preseason ===
Week	Date	Opponent	Result	Record	Venue	Recap
1	August 13	New York Jets	**W** 23–3	1–0	Ford Field	Recap
2	August 20	at Washington Redskins	**L** 17–21	1–1	FedExField	Recap
3	August 28	at Jacksonville Jaguars	**W** 22–17	2–1	EverBank Field	Recap
4	September 3	Buffalo Bills	**W** 17–10	3–1	Ford Field	Recap

=== Regular season ===
Week	Date	Opponent	Result	Record	Venue	Recap
1	September 13	at San Diego Chargers	**L** 28–33	0–1	Qualcomm Stadium	Recap
2	September 20	at **Minnesota Vikings**	**L** 16–26	0–2	TCF Bank Stadium	Recap
3	September 27	Denver Broncos	**L** 12–24	0–3	Ford Field	Recap
4	October 5	at Seattle Seahawks	**L** 10–13	0–4	CenturyLink Field	Recap
5	October 11	Arizona Cardinals	**L** 17–42	0–5	Ford Field	Recap
6	October 18	**Chicago Bears**	**W** 37–34 (OT)	1–5	Ford Field	Recap
7	October 25	**Minnesota Vikings**	**L** 19–28	1–6	Ford Field	Recap
8	November 1	at Kansas City Chiefs	**L** 10–45	1–7	(United Kingdom) Wembley Stadium (London)	Recap
9	Bye					
10	November 15	at **Green Bay Packers**	**W** 18–16	2–7	Lambeau Field	Recap
11	November 22	Oakland Raiders	**W** 18–13	3–7	Ford Field	Recap
12	November 26	Philadelphia Eagles	**W** 45–14	4–7	Ford Field	Recap
13	December 3	**Green Bay Packers**	**L** 23–27	4–8	Ford Field	Recap
14	December 13	at St. Louis Rams	**L** 14–21	4–9	Edward Jones Dome	Recap
15	December 21	at New Orleans Saints	**W** 35–27	5–9	Mercedes-Benz Superdome	Recap
16	December 27	San Francisco 49ers	**W** 32–17	6–9	Ford Field	Recap
17	January 3	at **Chicago Bears**	**W** 24–20	7–9	Soldier Field	Recap

Note: Intra-division opponents are in bold text.

=== Game summaries ===
==== Week 1: at San Diego Chargers ====
Week One: Detroit Lions at San Diego Chargers – Game summary

Quarter	1	2	3	4	Total
Lions	7	14	0	7	**28**
**Chargers**	3	7	10	13	**33**

at Qualcomm Stadium, San Diego, California

- Date: September 13
- Game time: 4:05 p.m. EDT/1:05 p.m. PDT
- Game weather: 84 °F (29 °C), sunny
- Game attendance: 66,093
- Referee: Clete Blakeman
- TV announcers (Fox): Thom Brennaman, Charles Davis and Tony Siragusa
- Recap, Gamebook

Game information

**First quarter**

- DET - Ameer Abdullah 24 yard rush. Matt Prater kick is good. Drive: 8 plays, 80 yards, 4:14. Lions 7–0.
- SD - Josh Lambo 32 yard field goal. Drive: 13 plays, 73 yards, 7:02. Lions 7–3.

**Second quarter**

- DET - Glover Quin 31 yard interception return. Matt Prater kick is good. Drive: 3 plays, 9 yards, 1:32. Lions 14–3.
- DET - Eric Ebron pass from Matthew Stafford for 18 yards. Matt Prater kick is good. Drive: 4 plays, 46 yards, 2:06. Lions 21–3.
- SD - Danny Woodhead 9 yard rush. Josh Lambo kick is good. Drive: 7 plays, 80 yards, 3:47. Lions 21–10.

**Third quarter**

- SD - Josh Lambo 25 yard field goal. Drive: 12 plays, 73 yards, 5:39. Lions 21–13.
- SD - Stevie Johnson pass from Philip Rivers for 12 yards. Josh Lambo kick is good. Drive: 3 plays, 16 yards, 1:12. Lions 21–20.

**Fourth quarter**

- SD - Ladarius Green pass from Philip Rivers for 13 yards. Josh Lambo kick is no good. Drive: 7 plays, 70 yards, 3:52. Chargers 26–21.
- SD - Danny Woodhead 1 yard rush. Josh Lambo kick is good. Drive: 11 plays, 86 yards, 6:18. Chargers 33–21.
- DET - Theo Riddick 21 yard pass from Matthew Stafford. Matt Prater kick is good. Drive: 7 plays, 83 yards, 1:29. Chargers 33–28.

**Top passers**

- DET – Matthew Stafford - 19/30, 246 yds, 2 TD, 2 INT
- SD – Philip Rivers - 35/42, 404 yds, 2 TD, 2 INT

**Top rushers**

- DET – Ameer Abdullah - 7 rushes, 50 yds, 1 TD
- SD – Melvin Gordon - 14 rushes, 51 yds

**Top receivers**

- DET – Eric Ebron - 4 catches, 53 yds, 1 TD
- SD – Keenan Allen - 15 catches, 166 yds

The visiting Lions opened the 2015 season at San Diego. Detroit held a 21–3 lead midway through the second quarter, only to see the Chargers reel off 30 unanswered points on their way to a 33–28 victory.

==== Week 2: at Minnesota Vikings ====
Week Two: Detroit Lions at Minnesota Vikings – Game summary

Quarter	1	2	3	4	Total
Lions	0	10	0	6	**16**
**Vikings**	7	10	6	3	**26**

at TCF Bank Stadium, Minneapolis, Minnesota

- Date: September 20
- Game time: 1:00 p.m. EDT/12:00 p.m. CDT
- Game weather: 67 °F (19 °C), partly cloudy
- Game attendance: 52,319
- Referee: Bill Vinovich
- TV announcers (Fox): Sam Rosen, Kirk Morrison and Peter Schrager
- Recap, Gamebook

Game information

**First quarter**

- MIN - Kyle Rudolph 5 yard pass from Teddy Bridgewater. Blair Walsh kick is good. 11 plays, 75 yards, 4:35. Vikings 7–0.

**Second quarter**

- MIN - Teddy Bridgewater 1 yard run. Blair Walsh kick is good. 7 plays, 50 yards, 2:58. Vikings 14–0.
- DET - Matt Prater 26 yard field goal. 14 plays, 72 yards, 7:14. Vikings 14–3.
- MIN - Blair Walsh 28 yard field goal. 9 plays, 70 yards, 4:40. Vikings 17–3.
- DET - Calvin Johnson 11 yard pass from Matthew Stafford. Matt Prater kick is good. 8 plays, 73 yards, 1:58. Vikings 17–10.

**Third quarter**

- MIN - Zach Line 1 yard run. Blair Walsh kick is no good. 6 plays, 34 yards, 2:31. Vikings 23–10.

**Fourth quarter**

- MIN - Blair Walsh 23 yard field goal. 10 plays, 34 yards, 5:46. Vikings 26–10.
- DET - Eric Ebron 12 yard pass from Matthew Stafford. Two-point conversion attempt failed. 18 plays, 82 yards, 4:32. Vikings 26–16.

**Top passers**

- DET – Matthew Stafford - 32/53, 286 yards, 2 TD, 1 INT
- MIN – Teddy Bridgewater - 14/18, 153 yards, 1 TD

**Top rushers**

- DET – Matthew Stafford - 4 carries, 20 yards
- MIN – Adrian Peterson - 29 carries, 134 yards

**Top receivers**

- DET – Calvin Johnson - 10 receptions, 83 yards, 1 TD
- MIN – Adrian Peterson - 2 receptions, 58 yards

The Vikings took an early 14–0 lead on the visiting Lions and never looked back, as Detroit struggled to find any offensive consistency, especially in the running game. (Quarterback Matthew Stafford was the leading rusher with only 20 yards.)

==== Week 3: vs. Denver Broncos ====
Week Three: Denver Broncos at Detroit Lions – Game summary

Quarter	1	2	3	4	Total
**Broncos**	0	14	0	10	**24**
Lions	0	6	6	0	**12**

at Ford Field, Detroit, Michigan

- Date: September 27
- Game time: 8:30 p.m. EDT
- Game weather: Played indoors (dome stadium)
- Game attendance: 62,920
- Referee: Jeff Triplette
- TV announcers (NBC): Al Michaels, Cris Collinsworth and Michele Tafoya
- Recap, Gamebook

Game information

**First quarter**

- No scoring plays

**Second quarter**

- DEN - Ronnie Hillman 1 yard rush. Brandon McManus kick is good. 12 plays, 80 yards, 6:25. Broncos 7–0
- DET - Joique Bell 1 yard rush. Matt Prater kick is blocked. 9 plays, 80 yards, 3:51. Broncos 7–6.
- DEN - Demaryius Thomas pass from Peyton Manning for 45 yards. Brandon McManus kick is good. 7 plays, 80 yards, 0:58. Broncos 14–6.

**Third quarter**

- DET -Ameer Abdullah 16 yard pass from Matthew Stafford. Two-point conversion is no good. 4 plays, 29 yards, 2:09. Broncos 14–12.

**Fourth quarter**

- DEN - Brandon McManus 48 yard field goal is good. 5 plays, 19 yards, 2:22. Broncos 17–12.
- DEN - Owen Daniels 11 yard pass from Peyton Manning. Brandon McManus kick is good. 5 plays, 51 yards, 1:09. Broncos 24–12.

**Top passers**

- DEN – Peyton Manning - 31/42, 324 yards, 2 TDs, 1 INT
- DET – Matthew Stafford - 31/45, 282 yards, 1 TD, 2 INT's

**Top rushers**

- DEN – C.J. Anderson - 8 carries, 18 yards
- DET – Ameer Abdullah - 8 carries, 23 yards

**Top receivers**

- DEN – Demaryius Thomas - 9 receptions, 92 yards, 1 TD
- DET – Calvin Johnson - 8 receptions, 77 yards

Playing in their home debut, the 0–2 Lions closed the game to 14–12 in the third quarter, but a two-point conversion to tie the score failed. Denver then scored the final 10 points for a 24–12 victory.

==== Week 4: at Seattle Seahawks ====
Week Four: Detroit Lions at Seattle Seahawks – Game summary

Quarter	1	2	3	4	Total
Lions	0	3	0	7	**10**
**Seahawks**	0	10	3	0	**13**

at CenturyLink Field, Seattle, Washington

- Date: October 5
- Game time: 8:30 p.m. EDT/5:30 p.m. PDT
- Game weather: Sunny, 74 °F (23 °C)
- Game attendance: 69,005
- Referee: Tony Corrente
- TV announcers (ESPN): Mike Tirico, Jon Gruden and Lisa Salters
- Recap, Gamebook

Game information

**First quarter**

  - No scoring plays

**Second quarter**

- SEA - Doug Baldwin 24 yard pass from Russell Wilson. Steven Hauschka kick is good. Drive: 6 plays, 67 yards, 2:59. Seahawks 7–0.
- DET - Matt Prater 41 yard field goal. Drive: 12 plays, 57 yards, 5:40. Seahawks 7–3.
- SEA - Steven Hauschka 51 yard field goal. Drive: 10 plays, 46 yards, 4:16. Seahawks 10–3.

**Third quarter**

- SEA - Steven Hauschka 52 yard field goal. Drive: 8 plays, 30 yards, 3:49. Seahawks 13–3.

**Fourth quarter**

- DET - Caraun Reid 27 yard fumble return. Matt Prater kick is good. Seahawks 13–10.

**Top passers**

- DET – Matthew Stafford - 24/35, 203 yards
- SEA – Russell Wilson - 20/26, 287 yards, 1 TD

**Top rushers**

- DET – Ameer Abdullah - 13 carries, 33 yards
- SEA – Thomas Rawls - 17 carries, 48 yards

**Top receivers**

- DET – Calvin Johnson - 7 receptions, 56 yards
- SEA – Jermaine Kearse - 2 receptions, 84 yards

Playing on Monday Night, the Lions had a chance to upset last year's NFC Champion Seattle Seahawks. Late in the fourth quarter, Calvin Johnson caught a pass from Matthew Stafford and was headed for a go-ahead touchdown until Kam Chancellor punched the ball from his hands at Seattle's 1-yard line. As the ball bounded into the end zone, K. J. Wright batted the ball across the end line. By NFL rules, the intentional guiding of the ball across the end line should have resulted in a penalty, giving the ball back to the Lions at the spot of the fumble. But the back judge ruled that Wright's act was not blatant, and Seattle was given the ball at their own 20-yard line, after which they proceeded to run out the clock.

Dean Blandino, NFL VP of Officiating, stated after the game that the on-field officials made a mistake, and Detroit should have regained possession at the 1-yard line.

With the loss, the Lions are 0–4, their worst start since 2010. With the Saints' win over the Cowboys on Sunday Night, the Lions are the league's only winless team.

==== Week 5: vs. Arizona Cardinals ====
Week Five: Arizona Cardinals at Detroit Lions – Game summary

Quarter	1	2	3	4	Total
**Cardinals**	0	28	7	7	**42**
Lions	7	0	0	10	**17**

at Ford Field, Detroit, Michigan

- Date: October 11
- Game time: 4:05 p.m. EDT
- Game weather: Played indoors (dome stadium)
- Game attendance: 60,816
- Referee: Gene Steratore
- TV announcers (Fox): Justin Kutcher, Daryl Johnston and Holly Sonders
- Recap, Gamebook

Game information

**First quarter**

- DET - Theo Riddick pass from Matthew Stafford for 6 yards. Matt Prater kick is good. Drive: 7 plays, 82 yards, 3:48. Lions 7–0.

**Second quarter**

- ARI - Darren Fells pass from Carson Palmer for 14 yards Chandler Catanzaro kick is good. Drive: 5 plays, 71 yards, 2:26. Tied 7–7.
- ARI - David Johnson 4 yard rush. Chandler Catanzaro kick is good. Drive: 1 play, 4 yards, 0:05. Cardinals 14–7.
- ARI - David Johnson 2 yard rush. Chandler Catanzaro kick is good. Drive: 5 plays, 99 yards, 2:25. Cardinals 21–7.
- ARI - John Brown 18 yard pass from Carson Palmer. Chandler Catanzaro kick is good. Drive: 3 plays, 22 yards, 0:47. Cardinals 28–7.

**Third quarter**

- ARI - Larry Fitzgerald pass from Carson Palmer for 2 yards. Chandler Catanzaro kick is good. Drive: 5 plays, 32 yards, 3:47. Cardinals 35–7.

**Fourth quarter**

- DET - Matt Prater 40 yard field goal. Drive: 10 plays, 60 yards, 2:13. Cardinals 35–10.
- ARI - Andre Ellington 63 yard rush. Chandler Catanzaro kick is good. Drive: 3 plays, 80 yards, 1:31. Cardinals 42–10.
- DET - Lance Moore pass from Dan Orlovsky for 13 yards. Matt Prater kick is good. Drive: 15 plays, 86 yards, 3:50. Cardinals 42–17.

**Top passers**

- ARI – Carson Palmer - 11/14, 161 yards, 3 TDs
- DET – Dan Orlovsky - 21/38, 1 TD, 1 INT

**Top rushers**

- ARI – Chris Johnson - 11 carries, 103 yards
- DET – Zach Zenner - 10 carries, 30 yards

**Top receivers**

- ARI – John Brown - 4 receptions, 73 yards, 1 TD
- DET – Golden Tate - 8 receptions, 74 yards

The highlight of the game was when Calvin Johnson caught his 671st pass with the Lions, breaking Herman Moore's franchise record. Inconsistent play by Matthew Stafford, including throwing 3 interceptions, forced him to the sidelines for the game's remainder. With the blowout loss, the Lions remained winless at 0–5.

This marks the first time the Lions have started a season 0–5 since 2008 (when they went 0-16).

==== Week 6: vs. Chicago Bears ====
Week Six: Chicago Bears at Detroit Lions – Game summary

Quarter	1	2	3	4	OT	Total
Bears	3	10	3	18	0	**34**
**Lions**	7	14	3	10	3	**37**

at Ford Field, Detroit, Michigan

- Date: October 18
- Game time: 1:00 p.m. EDT
- Game weather: Played indoors (dome stadium)
- Game attendance: 57,648
- Referee: Walt Coleman
- TV announcers (Fox): Chris Myers, Ronde Barber and Jennifer Hale
- Recap, Gamebook

Game information

**First quarter**

- DET - Lance Moore pass from Matthew Stafford for 20 yards. Matt Prater kick is good. Drive: 10 plays, 80 yards, 5:31. Lions 7–0.
- CHI - Robbie Gould 27 yard field goal. Drive: 10 plays, 71 yards, 4:41. Lions 7–3.

**Second quarter**

- CHI - Jeremy Langford 1 yard rush. Robbie Gould kick is good. Drive: 10 plays, 67 yards, 4:51. Bears 10–7.
- DET - Timothy Wright pass from Matthew Stafford for 8 yards. Matt Prater kick is good. Drive: 6 plays, 79 yards, 3:31. Lions 14–10.
- CHI - Robbie Gould 23 yard field goal. Drive: 10 plays, 72 yards, 4:27. Lions 14–13.
- DET - Golden Tate pass from Matthew Stafford for 2 yards. Matt Prater kick is good. Drive: 12 plays, 85 yards, 3:57. Lions 21–13.

**Third quarter**

- CHI - Robbie Gould 38 yard field goal. Drive: 4 plays, 1 yard, 1:30. Lions 21–16.
- DET - Matt Prater 39 yard field goal. Drive: 6 plays, 59 yards, 4:07. Lions 24–16.

**Fourth quarter**

- CHI - Alshon Jeffery pass from Jay Cutler. Robbie Gould kick is good. Drive: 3 plays, 21 yards, 1:31. Lions 24–23.
- CHI - Matt Forte 2 yard rush. Matt Forte pass from Jay Cutler two-point conversion is good. Drive: 7 plays, 24 yards, 3:09: Bears 31–24.
- DET - Matt Prater 32 yard field goal. Drive: 13 plays, 67 yards, 5:04. Bears 31–27.
- DET - Calvin Johnson pass from Matthew Stafford for 6 yards. Matt Prater kick is good. Drive: 5 plays, 66 yards, 2:02. Lions 34–31.
- CHI - Robbie Gould 29 yard field goal. Drive: 3 plays, 69 yards, 0:21. Tied 34–34.

**Overtime**

- DET - Matt Prater 27 yard field goal. Drive: 8 plays, 77 yards, 3:54. Lions 37–34.

**Top passers**

- CHI – Jay Cutler - 26/41, 353 yards, 1 TD
- DET – Matthew Stafford - 27/42, 405 yards, 4 TDs

**Top rushers**

- CHI – Matt Forte - 24 carries, 69 yards
- DET – Ameer Abdullah - 14 carries, 48 yards

**Top receivers**

- CHI – Alshon Jeffery - 8 receptions, 147 yards
- DET – Calvin Johnson - 6 receptions, 166 yards

With an overtime victory over the visiting Chicago Bears, the Detroit Lions are no longer winless, improving to 1–5. A 57-yard bomb from Matthew Stafford to Calvin Johnson with under three minutes to play in overtime set up Matt Prater for the game-winning 27-yard field goal.

==== Week 7: vs. Minnesota Vikings ====
Week Seven: Minnesota Vikings at Detroit Lions – Game summary

Quarter	1	2	3	4	Total
**Vikings**	3	12	10	3	**28**
Lions	14	3	0	2	**19**

at Ford Field, Detroit, Michigan

- Date: October 25
- Game time: 1:00 p.m. EDT
- Game weather: Played indoors (dome stadium)
- Game attendance: 60,231
- Referee: Ed Hochuli
- TV announcers (Fox): Chris Myers, Ronde Barber and Jennifer Hale
- Recap, Gamebook

Game information

**First quarter**

- DET - Calvin Johnson 1 yard pass from Matthew Stafford. Matt Prater kick is good. Drive: 7 plays, 75 yards, 3:50. Lions 7–0.
- MIN - Blair Walsh 37 yard field goal is good. Drive: 15 plays, 63 yards, 7:23. Lions 7–3.
- DET - Eric Ebron 7 yard pass from Matthew Stafford. Matt Prater kick is good. Drive: 4 plays, 80 yards, 2:23. Lions 14–3.

**Second quarter**

- MIN - Blair Walsh 53 yard field goal is good. Drive: 9 plays, 37 yards, 5:13. Lions 14–6.
- DET - Matt Prater 52 yard field goal is good. Drive: 6 plays, 8 yards, 2:53. Lions 17–6.
- MIN - Kyle Rudolph 1 yard pass from Teddy Bridgewater. Blair Walsh kick is no good. Drive: 7 plays, 79 yards, 3:14. Lions 17–12.
- MIN - Blair Walsh 51 yard field goal is good. Drive: 8 plays, 19 yards, 1:13. Lions 17–15.

**Third quarter**

- MIN - Stefon Diggs 36 yard pass from Teddy Bridgewater. Blair Walsh Kick is good. Drive: 8 plays, 78 yards, 4:41. Vikings 22–17.
- MIN - Blair Walsh 35 yard field goal is good. Drive: 5 plays, 61 yards, 2:07. Vikings 25–17.

**Fourth quarter**

- MIN - Blair Walsh 22 yard field goal is good. Drive: 10 plays, 49 yards, 4:57. Vikings 28–17.
- DET - Vikings punter Jeff Locke steps out of bounds in end zone for a Lions safety. Drive: 4 plays, -1 yard, 0:57. Vikings 28–19.

**Top passers**

- MIN – Teddy Bridgewater - 25/35, 316 yards, 2 TDs
- DET – Matthew Stafford - 18/26, 256 yards, 2 TDs

**Top rushers**

- MIN – Adrian Peterson - 19 carries, 98 yards
- DET – Ameer Abdullah - 8 carries, 43 yards

**Top receivers**

- MIN – Stefon Diggs - 6 receptions, 108 yards, 1 TD
- DET – Eric Ebron - 5 receptions, 89 yards, 1 TD

Despite leading 17–15 at halftime, the Lions only managed to score 2 more points the rest of the game on an intentional safety taken by the Vikings in the closing seconds, losing 28–19 and dropping to 1–6. Quarterback Matthew Stafford was hit 13 times and sacked 7 times. The next day, the Lions fired offensive coordinator Joe Lombardi, offensive line coach Jeremiah Washburn and assistant offensive line coach Terry Heffernan. Quarterbacks coach Jim Bob Cooter will take over as offensive coordinator, tight ends coach Ron Prince takes over for Washburn, and special teams assistant Devin Fitzsimmons takes over as the new tight ends coach.

==== Week 8: at Kansas City Chiefs ====
Week Eight: Detroit Lions at Kansas City Chiefs – Game summary

Quarter	1	2	3	4	Total
Lions	3	0	0	7	**10**
**Chiefs**	7	17	7	14	**45**

at Wembley Stadium, London, England

- Date: November 1
- Game time: 2:30 p.m. GMT/9:30 a.m. EST
- Game weather: 50 °F (10 °C), cloudy
- Game attendance: 83,624
- Referee: Jeff Triplette
- TV announcers (Fox): Sam Rosen, John Lynch and Pam Oliver
- Recap, Gamebook

Game information

**First quarter**

- DET - Matt Prater 35 yard field goal is good. Drive: 10 plays, 63 yards, 5:51. Lions 3–0.
- KC - De'Anthony Thomas 10 yard run. Cairo Santos kick is good. Drive: 9 plays, 56 yards, 5:02. Chiefs 7–3.

**Second quarter**

- KC - Alex Smith 12 yard run. Cairo Santos kick is good. Drive: 7 plays, 73 yards, 2:47. Chiefs 14–3.
- KC - Cairo Santos 33 yard field goal is good. Drive: 6 plays, 22 yards, 2:42. Chiefs 17–3.
- KC - Charcandrick West 8 yard run. Cairo Santos kick is good. Drive: 6 plays, 52 yards, 2:53. Chiefs 24–3.

**Third quarter**

- KC - Travis Kelce 2 yard pass from Alex Smith. Cairo Santos kick is good. Drive: 11 plays, 61 yards, 6:07. Chiefs 31–3.

**Fourth quarter**

- KC - Jeremy Maclin 17 yard pass from Alex Smith. Cairo Santos kick is good. Drive: 2 plays, 16 yards, 0:46. Chiefs 38–3.
- DET - Lance Moore 21 yard pass from Matthew Stafford. Matt Prater kick is good. Drive: 7 plays, 77 yards, 2:50. Chiefs 38–10.
- KC - Spencer Ware 4 yard run. Cairo Santos kick is good. Drive: 2 plays, 41 yards, 0:41. Chiefs 45–10.

**Top passers**

- DET – Matthew Stafford - 22/36, 217 yards, 1 TD, 2 INTs
- KC – Alex Smith - 18/26, 145 yards, 2 TDs

**Top rushers**

- DET – Joique Bell - 7 carries, 56 yards
- KC – Charcandrick West - 20 carries, 97 yards, 1 TD

**Top receivers**

- DET – Calvin Johnson - 5 receptions, 85 yards
- KC – Travis Kelce - 6 receptions, 49 yards, 1 TD

After the blowout overseas loss, the Lions entered their bye week at 1–7, the NFL's worst record so far this season. Despite the changeover in offensive coaches, Matthew Stafford was sacked six more times. On November 5, the Lions fired President Tom Lewand and general manager Martin Mayhew. Former vice president of pro personnel Sheldon White will serve as the team's interim general manager.

==== Week 10: at Green Bay Packers ====
Week Ten: Detroit Lions at Green Bay Packers – Game summary

Quarter	1	2	3	4	Total
**Lions**	0	3	6	9	**18**
Packers	3	0	0	13	**16**

at Lambeau Field, Green Bay, Wisconsin

- Date: November 15
- Game time: 1:00 p.m. EST/12:00 p.m. CST
- Game weather: Sunny, 55 °F (13 °C)
- Game attendance: 78,526
- Referee: John Hussey
- TV announcers (Fox): Joe Buck, Troy Aikman and Erin Andrews
- Recap, Gamebook

Game information

**First quarter**

- GB - Mason Crosby 44 yard field goal is good. Drive: 12 plays, 57 yards, 4:54. Packers 3–0.

**Second quarter**

- DET - Matt Prater 49 yard field goal is good. Drive: 5 plays, 22 yards, 0:33. Tied 3–3.

**Third quarter**

- DET - Brandon Pettigrew pass from Matthew Stafford for 2 yards. Matt Prater kick is no good. Drive: 3 plays, 1 yard, 1:27. Lions 9–3.

**Fourth quarter**

- DET - Matt Prater 51 yard field goal is good. Drive: 5 plays, 22 yards, 1:39. Lions 12–3.
- GB - Richard Rodgers pass from Aaron Rodgers for 4 yards. Mason Crosby kick is good. Drive: 11 plays, 78 yards, 4:05. Lions 12–10.
- DET - Lance Moore pass from Matthew Stafford for 4 yards. Matt Prater kick is no good. Drive: 9 plays, 80 yards, 3:58. Lions 18–10.
- GB - Justin Perillo pass from Aaron Rodgers for 11 yards. Two point conversion attempt is no good. Drive: 8 plays, 73 yards, 1:25. Lions 18–16.

**Top passers**

- DET – Matthew Stafford - 24/38, 242 yards, 2 TDs, 1 INT
- GB – Aaron Rodgers - 35/61, 333 yards, 2 TDs

**Top rushers**

- DET – Joique Bell - 14 carries, 17 yards
- GB – James Starks - 15 carries, 42 yards

**Top receivers**

- DET – Calvin Johnson - 6 receptions, 81 yards
- GB – Davante Adams - 10 receptions, 79 yards

The 1–7 Lions withstood a late rally to earn an upset win over the 6–2 Packers. This was the first Lions win over Green Bay in Wisconsin since 1991. Ameer Abdullah set up the Lions first touchdown when he returned a kickoff 104 yards, and was stopped at the one-yard line. This tied the record set by Percy Harvin in 2011 for the longest non-scoring play in NFL history.

==== Week 11: vs. Oakland Raiders ====
Week Eleven: Oakland Raiders at Detroit Lions – Game summary

Quarter	1	2	3	4	Total
Raiders	0	0	13	0	**13**
**Lions**	6	3	0	9	**18**

at Ford Field, Detroit, Michigan

- Date: November 22
- Game time: 1:00 p.m. EST
- Game weather: Played indoors (dome stadium)
- Game attendance: 60,202
- Referee: Clete Blakeman
- TV announcers (CBS): Andrew Catalon, Steve Beuerlein and Steve Tasker
- Recap, Gamebook

Game information

**First quarter**

- DET - Matt Prater 29 yard field goal is good. Drive: 13 plays, 67 yards, 7:06. Lions 3–0.
- DET - Matt Prater 41 yard field goal is good. Drive: 10 plays, 53 yards, 5:30. Lions 6–0.

**Second quarter**

- DET - Matt Prater 51 yard field goal is good. Drive: 11 plays, 57 yards, 2:38. Lions 9–0.

**Third quarter**

- OAK - Latavius Murray 1 yard rush. Sabastian Janikowski kick is good. Drive: 10 plays, 80 yards, 4:36. Lions 9–7.
- OAK - Sebastian Janikowski 48 yard field goal is good. Drive: 7 plays, 22 yards, 2:55. Raiders 10–9.
- OAK - Sebastian Janikowski 56 yard field goal is good. Drive: 5 plays, 35 yards, 2:06. Raiders 13–9.

**Fourth quarter**

- DET - Matthew Stafford 5 yard rush. Matt Prater kick is good. Drive: 9 plays, 80 yards, 4:11. Lions 16–13.
- DET - Donald Penn of Raiders tackled in end zone for safety. 2 plays, -8 yards, 0:30. Lions 18–13.

**Top passers**

- OAK – Derek Carr - 13/25, 169 yards
- DET – Matthew Stafford - 22/35, 282 yards

**Top rushers**

- OAK – Latavius Murray - 13 carries, 28 yards, 1 TD
- DET – Ameer Abdullah - 12 carries, 44 yards

**Top receivers**

- OAK – Seth Roberts - 2 receptions, 54 yards
- DET – Calvin Johnson - 5 receptions 88 yards

The 18–13 win over the visiting Raiders gave the Lions their first back–to–back victories of the season. The Lions became the first team in NFL history to score exactly 18 points in consecutive games.

==== Week 12: vs. Philadelphia Eagles ====
Thanksgiving Day game

Week Twelve: Philadelphia Eagles at Detroit Lions – Game summary

Quarter	1	2	3	4	Total
Eagles	0	7	0	7	**14**
**Lions**	7	17	14	7	**45**

at Ford Field, Detroit, Michigan

- Date: November 26
- Game time: 12:30 p.m. EST
- Game weather: Played indoors (dome stadium)
- Game attendance: 64,445
- Referee: John Parry
- TV announcers (Fox): Joe Buck, Troy Aikman and Erin Andrews
- Recap, Gamebook

Game information

**First quarter**

- DET – Theo Riddick 8-yard pass from Matthew Stafford (Matt Prater kick), 2:14. Lions 7–0. **Drive: 8 plays, 65 yards, 4:27.**

**Second quarter**

- PHI – Brent Celek 2-yard pass from Mark Sanchez (Caleb Sturgis kick), 14:26. Tied 7–7. **Drive: 7 plays, 80 yards, 2:50.**
- DET – Golden Tate 2-yard pass from Matthew Stafford (Matt Prater kick), 7:58. Lions 14–7. **Drive: 12 plays, 80 yards, 6:27.**
- DET – Matt Prater 48-yard field goal, 5:04. Lions 17–7. **Drive: 6 plays, 25 yards, 2:21.**
- DET – Calvin Johnson 25-yard pass from Matthew Stafford (Matt Prater kick), 0:17. Lions 24–7. **Drive: 11 plays, 88 yards, 3:56.**

**Third quarter**

- DET – Calvin Johnson 4-yard pass from Matthew Stafford (Matt Prater kick), 7:13. Lions 31–7. **Drive: 12 plays, 80 yards, 7:51.**
- DET – Calvin Johnson 3-yard pass from Matthew Stafford (Matt Prater kick), 5:10. Lions 38–7. **Drive: 4 plays, 14 yards, 1:28.**

**Fourth quarter**

- DET – Joique Bell 1-yard run (Matt Prater kick), 10:45. Lions 45–7. **Drive: 6 plays, 75 yards, 3:36.**
- PHI – Jordan Matthews 24-yard pass from Mark Sanchez (Caleb Sturgis kick), 3:02. Lions 45–14. **Drive: 9 plays, 55 yards, 3:07.**

**Top passers**

- PHI – Mark Sanchez – 19/27, 199 yards, 2 TD
- DET – Matthew Stafford – 27/38, 337 yards, 5 TD

**Top rushers**

- PHI – Kenjon Barner – 7 rushes, 30 yards
- DET – Ameer Abdullah – 16 rushes, 63 yards

**Top receivers**

- PHI – Jordan Matthews – 3 receptions, 60 yards, TD
- DET – Calvin Johnson – 8 receptions, 93 yards, 3 TD

Celebrating their 76th Thanksgiving Day game, the Lions routed the Eagles for their third consecutive win. Matthew Stafford threw five touchdown passes, three of them to Calvin Johnson. Having lost at Ford Field for the first time, the Eagles dropped to 6–1 when playing on Thanksgiving.

==== Week 13: vs. Green Bay Packers ====
Week Thirteen: Green Bay Packers at Detroit Lions – Game summary

Quarter	1	2	3	4	Total
**Packers**	0	0	14	13	**27**
Lions	17	0	3	3	**23**

at Ford Field, Detroit, Michigan

- Date: December 3
- Game time: 8:25 p.m. EST
- Game weather: Played indoors (dome stadium)
- Game attendance: 63,207
- Referee: Carl Cheffers
- TV announcers (CBS/NFLN): Jim Nantz, Phil Simms and Tracy Wolfson
- Recap, Gamebook

Game information

**First quarter**

- DET – Matt Prater 51-yard field goal, 8:53. Lions 3–0. **Drive: 7 plays, 35 yards, 4:04.**
- DET – Eric Ebron 3-yard pass from Matthew Stafford (Matt Prater kick), 1:53. Lions 10–0. **Drive: 8 plays, 76 yards, 4:53.**
- DET – Calvin Johnson 17-yard pass from Matthew Stafford (Matt Prater kick), 1:08. Lions 17–0. **Drive: 1 play, 17 yards, 0:06.**

**Second quarter**

- No scoring plays.

**Third quarter**

- DET – Matt Prater 34-yard field goal, 8:58. Lions 20-0. **Drive: 11 plays, 66 yards, 6:06.**
- GB – Randall Cobb fumble recovery in DET end zone (Mason Crosby kick), 5:53. Lions 20–7. **Drive: 7 plays, 75 yards, 3:10.**
- GB – Davante Adams 8-yard pass from Aaron Rodgers (Mason Crosby kick), 4:12. Lions 20–14. **Drive: 3 plays, 12 yards, 1:31.**

**Fourth quarter**

- DET – Matt Prater 42-yard field goal, 7:11. Lions 23-14. **Drive: 13 plays, 34 yards, 6:29.**
- GB – Aaron Rodgers 17-yard run (Mason Crosby kick), 3:12. Lions 23–21. **Drive: 11 plays, 84 yards, 4:02.**
- GB – Richard Rodgers 61-yard pass from Aaron Rodgers (rush failed), 0:00. Packers 27–23. **Drive: 4 plays, 79 yards, 0:23.**

**Top passers**

- GB – Aaron Rodgers – 24/36, 273 yards, 2 TD, INT
- DET – Matthew Stafford – 23/35, 220 yards, 2 TD

**Top rushers**

- GB – Aaron Rodgers – 4 rushes, 27 yards, TD
- DET – Ameer Abdullah – 13 rushes, 67 yards

**Top receivers**

- GB – Richard Rodgers – 8 receptions, 146 yards, TD
- DET – Golden Tate – 8 receptions, 63 yards

Despite the Lions leading the entire game, the Packers came back and won the game after the official clock expired when a controversial facemask penalty against Devin Taylor gave them one extra untimed play. On that play, Aaron Rodgers threw a 61-yard Hail Mary pass to Richard Rodgers for the winning touchdown. The play was later dubbed the "Miracle in Motown".

With the loss, the Lions dropped to 4–8 and failed to complete what would've been their first sweep over the Packers since 1991.

==== Week 14: at St. Louis Rams ====
Week Fourteen: Detroit Lions at St. Louis Rams – Game summary

Quarter	1	2	3	4	Total
Lions	0	0	7	7	**14**
**Rams**	0	7	7	7	**21**

at Edward Jones Dome, St. Louis, Missouri

- Date: December 13
- Game time: 1:00 p.m. EST/12:00 p.m. CST
- Game weather: Played indoors (dome stadium)
- Game attendance: 51,202
- Referee: Walt Anderson
- TV announcers (Fox): Chris Myers, Ronde Barber and Jennifer Hale
- Recap, Gamebook

Game information

**First quarter**

- No scoring plays.

**Second quarter**

- STL – Trumaine Johnson 58-yard interception return (Greg Zuerlein kick), 5:07. Rams 7–0.

**Third quarter**

- DET – Golden Tate 9-yard pass from Matthew Stafford (Matt Prater kick), 7:39. Tied 7–7. **Drive: 7 plays, 65 yards, 4:21.**
- STL – Todd Gurley 5-yard run (Greg Zuerlein kick), 4:02. Rams 14–7. **Drive: 5 plays, 80 yards, 3:38.**

**Fourth quarter**

- STL – Todd Gurley 15-yard run (Greg Zuerlein kick), 12:25. Rams 21–7. **Drive: 7 plays, 91 yards, 3:33.**
- DET – Golden Tate 2-yard pass from Matthew Stafford (Matt Prater kick), 2:07. Rams 21–14. **Drive: 14 plays, 86 yards, 4:13.**

**Top passers**

- DET – Matthew Stafford – 30/46, 245 yards, 2 TD, INT
- STL – Case Keenum – 14/22, 124 yards, INT

**Top rushers**

- DET – Joique Bell – 7 rushes, 50 yards
- STL – Todd Gurley – 16 rushes, 140 yards, 2 TD

**Top receivers**

- DET – Golden Tate – 9 receptions, 60 yards, 2 TD
- STL – Kenny Britt – 2 receptions, 35 yards

After a scoreless first quarter against the Rams in St. Louis, the Lions' attempt at a comeback in the second half fell short. The ninth loss guaranteed a losing season, the team's third in the last four years, and officially eliminated the Lions from playoff contention.

==== Week 15: at New Orleans Saints ====
Week Fifteen: Detroit Lions at New Orleans Saints – Game summary

Quarter	1	2	3	4	Total
**Lions**	7	14	7	7	**35**
Saints	3	0	7	17	**27**

at Mercedes-Benz Superdome, New Orleans, Louisiana

- Date: December 21
- Game time: 8:30 p.m. EST/7:30 p.m. CST
- Game weather: Played indoors (dome stadium)
- Game attendance: 73,017
- Referee: Pete Morelli
- TV announcers (ESPN): Mike Tirico, Jon Gruden and Lisa Salters
- Recap, Gamebook

Game information

**First quarter**

- DET - Golden Tate 1 yard pass from Matthew Stafford. Matt Prater kick is good. Drive: 6 plays, 40 yards, 2:34. Lions 7–0.
- NO - Kai Forbath 45 yard field goal. Drive: 12 plays, 56 yards, 6:45. Lions 7–3.

**Second quarter**

- DET - Michael Burton 4 yard pass from Matthew Stafford. Matt Prater kick is good. Drive: 4 plays, 65 yards, 1:54. Lions 14–3.
- DET - Golden Tate 5 yard pass from Matthew Stafford. Matt Prater kick is good. Drive: 10 plays, 69 yards, 6:38. Lions 21–3.

**Third quarter**

- DET - Ameer Abdullah 15 yard run. Matt Prater kick is good. Drive: 6 plays, 78 yards, 3:10. Lions 28–3.
- NO - Brandin Cooks 27 yard pass from Drew Brees. Kai Forbath kick is good. Drive: 5 plays, 69 yards, 2:28. Lions 28–10.

**Fourth quarter**

- NO - Kai Forbath 22 yard field goal. Drive: 8 plays, 69 yards, 3:19. Lions 28–13.
- NO - Marques Colston 11 yard pass from Drew Brees. Kai Forbath kick is good. 5 plays, 38 yards, 2:41. Lions 28–20.
- DET - Joique Bell 1 yard run. Matt Prater kick is good. Drive: 9 plays, 76 yards, 4:42. Lions 35–20.
- NO - Benjamin Watson 1 yard pass from Drew Brees. Kai Forbath kick is good. Drive: 15 plays, 80 yards, 3:29. Lions 35–27.

**Top passers**

- DET – Matthew Stafford - 22/25, 254 yards, 3 TDs
- NO – Drew Brees - 34/52, 341 yards, 3 TDs

**Top rushers**

- DET – Ameer Abdullah - 9 carries, 77 yards
- NO – Tim Hightower - 13 carries, 54 yards

**Top receivers**

- DET – Eric Ebron - 4 receptions, 79 yards
- NO – Brandin Cooks - 10 receptions, 124 yards

The Lions defeated the Saints 35–27, as Matthew Stafford posted a single-game career high in passer rating (148.6), and broke Jon Kitna's single-game franchise record with an 88.0 completion percentage (22-for-25). It was the team's first road win over the Saints since 2005.

==== Week 16: vs. San Francisco 49ers ====
Week Sixteen: San Francisco 49ers at Detroit Lions – Game summary

Quarter	1	2	3	4	Total
49ers	7	10	0	0	**17**
**Lions**	3	17	3	9	**32**

at Ford Field, Detroit, Michigan

- Date: December 27
- Game time: 1:00 p.m. EST
- Game weather: Played indoors (dome stadium)
- Game attendance: 61,313
- Referee: Bill Vinovich
- TV announcers (Fox): Thom Brennaman, Charles Davis and Tony Siragusa
- Recap, Gamebook

Game information

**First quarter**

- SF - Vance McDonald 1 yard pass from Blaine Gabbert. Phil Dawson kick is good. Drive: 11 plays, 80 yards, 5:36. 49ers 7–0.
- DET - Matt Prater 36 yard field goal is good. Drive: 8 plays, 44 yards, 4:05. Lions 7–3.

**Second quarter**

- DET - TJ Jones 29 yard pass from Matthew Stafford. Matt Prater kick is good. Drive: 9 plays, 74 yards, 4:39. Lions 10–7.
- SF - Torrey Smith 16 yard pass from Blaine Gabbert. Phil Dawson kick is good. Drive: 7 plays, 82 yards, 2:49. 49ers 14–10.
- DET - Joique Bell 1 yard run. Matt Prater kick. Drive: 1 play, 1 yard, 0:03. Lions 17–14.
- SF - Phil Dawson 40 yd field goal is good. Drive: 9 plays, 68 yards, 2:06. Tied 17–17.
- DET - Matt Prater 38 yard field goal is good. Drive: 4 plays, 60 yards, 0:35. Lions 20–17.

**Third quarter**

- DET - Matt Prater 37 yard field goal is good. Drive: 11 plays, 64 yards, 6:35. Lions 23–17.

**Fourth quarter**

- DET - Calvin Johnson 1 yd pass from Matthew Stafford. Drive: 13 plays, 67 yards, 7:27. Lions 29–17.
- DET - Matt Prater 34 yard field goal is good. Drive: 9 plays, 24 yards, 3:43. Lions 32–17.

**Top passers**

- SF – Blaine Gabbert - 22/33, 225 yards, 2 TDs
- DET – Matthew Stafford - 29/37, 301 yards, 2 TDs

**Top rushers**

- SF – DuJuan Harris - 11 carries, 73 yards
- DET – Ameer Abdullah - 8 carries, 39 yards

**Top receivers**

- SF – Vance McDonald - 5 receptions, 61 yards, 1 TD
- DET – Calvin Johnson - 6 receptions, 77 yards, 1 TD

After multiple lead changes and a close halftime score, the Lions pulled away and won their last home game of the season, keeping the 49ers scoreless for the entire second half. Theo Riddick caught 7 passes for 63 yards, giving him 668 receiving yards on the season, a Lions franchise record for a running back.

With the win, the Lions ended their nine-game losing streak against the 49ers and defeated them for the first time since the 1995 season.

==== Week 17: at Chicago Bears ====
Week Seventeen: Detroit Lions at Chicago Bears – Game summary

Quarter	1	2	3	4	Total
**Lions**	7	3	7	7	**24**
Bears	0	0	10	10	**20**

at Soldier Field, Chicago, Illinois

- Date: January 3, 2016
- Game time: 1:00 p.m. EST/12:00 p.m. CST
- Game weather: 31 °F (−1 °C), cloudy
- Game attendance: 61,177
- Referee: John Hussey
- TV announcers (Fox): Joe Davis, Brady Quinn and Molly McGrath
- Recap, Gamebook

Game information

**First quarter**

- DET - Timothy Wright 9 yard pass from Matthew Stafford. Matt Prater kick is good. Drive: 9 plays, 77 yards, 4:46. Lions 7–0.

**Second quarter**

- DET - Matt Prater 59 yard field goal. Drive: 3 plays, -2 yards, 0:11. Lions 10–0.

**Third quarter**

- CHI - Robbie Gould 49 yard field goal. Drive: 10 plays, 52 yards, 5:57. Lions 10–3.
- CHI - Joshua Bellamy 34 yard pass from Jay Cutler. Robbie Gould kick is good. Drive: 3 plays, 41 yards, 1:22. Tied 10–10.
- DET - Calvin Johnson 36 yard pass from Matthew Stafford. Matt Prater kick is good. Drive: 8 plays, 72 yards, 4:21. Lions 17–10.

**Fourth quarter**

- CHI - Matt Forte 23 yard pass from Jay Cutler. Robbie Gould kick is good. Drive: 6 plays, 83 yards, 2:47. Tied 17–17.
- DET - Eric Ebron 1 yard pass from Matthew Stafford. Matt Prater kick is good. Drive: 8 plays, 80 yards, 4:34. Lions 24–17.
- CHI - Robbie Gould 34 yard field goal. Drive: 7 plays, 37 yards, 3:07. Lions 24–20.

**Top passers**

- DET – Matthew Stafford - 28/39, 298 yards, 3 TDs
- CHI – Jay Cutler - 17/23, 245 yards, 2 TDs, 3 INTs

**Top rushers**

- DET – Ameer Abdullah - 10 carries, 44 yards
- CHI – Matt Forte - 17 carries, 76 yards

**Top receivers**

- DET – Calvin Johnson - 10 receptions, 137 yards
- CHI – Marc Mariani - 6 receptions, 80 yards

The Lions completed a season sweep of their division rival Chicago Bears with a 24–20 win. The loss sunk the Bears to last place in the NFC North, with the Lions finishing third. Matthew Stafford completed 28 of 39 passes, giving him a season completion percentage of 67.2, the best for a quarterback in franchise history. Theo Riddick caught 4 passes for 29 yards, giving him season totals of 80 receptions and 697 yards, both franchise records for a running back. The Lions finished the season with three players catching 80 passes or more – Golden Tate (90), Calvin Johnson (88) and Riddick (80) – a first for any Lions team. Matt Prater kicked a 59-yard field goal in the game, the longest in Lions franchise history and the longest ever kicked at Soldier Field.

== Standings ==
=== Division ===
NFC North
	W	L	T	PCT	DIV	CONF	PF	PA	STK
^{(3)} Minnesota Vikings	11	5	0	.688	5–1	8–4	365	302	W3
^{(5)} Green Bay Packers	10	6	0	.625	3–3	7–5	368	323	L2
Detroit Lions	7	9	0	.438	3–3	6–6	358	400	W3
Chicago Bears	6	10	0	.375	1–5	3–9	335	397	L1

=== Conference ===
NFC
#	Team	Division	W	L	T	PCT	DIV	CONF	SOS	SOV	STK
Division Leaders
1	Carolina Panthers	South	15	1	0	.938	5–1	11–1	.441	.438	W1
2	Arizona Cardinals	West	13	3	0	.813	4–2	10–2	.477	.457	L1
3	Minnesota Vikings	North	11	5	0	.688	5–1	8–4	.504	.449	W3
4	Washington Redskins	East	9	7	0	.563	4–2	8–4	.465	.403	W4
Wild Cards
5 (Note: Green Bay finished ahead of Seattle based on head-to-head victory.)	Green Bay Packers	North	10	6	0	.625	3–3	7–5	.531	.450	L2
6	Seattle Seahawks	West	10	6	0	.625	3–3	7–5	.520	.431	W1
Did not qualify for the postseason
7	Atlanta Falcons	South	8	8	0	.500	1–5	5–7	.480	.453	L1
8 (Note: St. Louis and Detroit finished ahead of Philadelphia and New Orleans based on conference record. St. Louis finished ahead of Detroit based on head-to-head victory. Detroit finished ahead of Philadelphia and New Orleans based on head-to-head sweep, while Philadelphia finished ahead of New Orleans based on head-to-head victory.)	St. Louis Rams	West	7	9	0	.438	4–2	6–6	.527	.482	L1
9	Detroit Lions	North	7	9	0	.438	3–3	6–6	.535	.429	W3
10	Philadelphia Eagles	East	7	9	0	.438	3–3	4–8	.508	.473	W1
11	New Orleans Saints	South	7	9	0	.438	3–3	5–7	.504	.402	W2
12 (Note: The New York Giants and Chicago each finished ahead of Tampa Bay based on head-to-head victory, while the Giants finished ahead of Chicago based on conference record.)	New York Giants	East	6	10	0	.375	2–4	4–8	.500	.396	L3
13	Chicago Bears	North	6	10	0	.375	1–5	3–9	.547	.469	L1
14	Tampa Bay Buccaneers	South	6	10	0	.375	3–3	5–7	.484	.406	L4
15	San Francisco 49ers	West	5	11	0	.313	1–5	4–8	.539	.463	W1
16	Dallas Cowboys	East	4	12	0	.250	3–3	3–9	.531	.438	L4
Tiebreakers (Note: When breaking ties for three or more teams under the NFL's rules, they are first broken within divisions, then comparing only the highest-ranked remaining team from each division.)

== Staff ==
2015 Detroit Lions staff
Front office: Owner/chairman – Martha Firestone Ford; Vice chairman – William Clay Ford, Jr.; President – Rod Wood; COO - Allison Maki; General manager – Sheldon White (interim); Senior personnel executive – Brian Xanders; Senior personnel executive – Scott McEwen; Senior vice president of football operations – Cedric Saunders; Director of college scouting – Lance Newmark; Assistant director of pro personnel – Rob Lohman; Head coaches: Head coach – Jim Caldwell; Assistant head coach/tight ends/ interim offensive line – Ron Prince; Offensive coaches: Offensive coordinator – Joe Lombardi (fired Oct 26, 2015); Quarterbacks/interim offensive coordinator – Jim Bob Cooter; Running backs – Curtis Modkins; Wide receivers – Robert Prince; Interim tight ends – Devin Fitzsimmons; Offensive line – Jeremiah Washburn (fired Oct 26, 2015); Assistant offensive line – Ryan Silverfield; Offensive assistant/research & analysis – Evan Rothstein	Defensive coaches: Defensive coordinator – Teryl Austin; Defensive line – Kris Kocurek; Assistant defensive line – Jim Washburn; Linebackers – Bill Sheridan; Safeties – Alan Williams; Cornerbacks – Tony Oden; Senior coaching assistant – Gunther Cunningham; Defensive quality control – Matt Raich; Special teams coaches: Special teams coordinator – Joe Marciano; Strength and conditioning: coordinator of physical development – Jason Arapoff; Assistant strength and conditioning – Ted Rath
