= Sheldon White =

American football player and executive (born 1965)

Pittsburgh Steelers
- Title: Senior personnel executive

Personal information
- Born: March 1, 1965 (age 61); Dayton, Ohio, U.S.
- Listed height: 5 ft 11 in (1.80 m)
- Listed weight: 188 lb (85 kg)

Career information
- Position: Cornerback (No. 39, 25)
- High school: Meadowdale (Dayton)
- College: Miami (OH) (1984–1987)
- NFL draft: 1988: 3rd round, 62nd overall pick

Career history

Playing
- New York Giants (1988–1989); Detroit Lions (1990–1992); Cincinnati Bengals (1993)

Operations
- Detroit Lions (1997–2015); Scout (1997–2000); Director of pro personnel (2000–2009); Vice president of pro personnel (2009–2015); Interim general manager (2015); Michigan State (2016–2020) Executive director of player personnel and recruiting; Washington Football Team (2021) College scout; Pittsburgh Steelers (2022–present); Director of pro scouting (2022-2025); Senior personnel executive (2026-present)

Career NFL statistics
- Interceptions: 11
- Interception yards: 151
- Touchdowns: 1
- Stats at Pro Football Reference

Sheldon Darnell White (born March 1, 1965) is an American football executive and former player who is the senior personnel executive for the Pittsburgh Steelers of the National Football League (NFL). He played college football at Miami Ohio.

== Career ==
Pre-draft measurables
Height	Weight	Hand span	40-yard dash	10-yard split	20-yard split	20-yard shuttle	Vertical jump	Broad jump	Bench press
5 ft 11 1/8 in (1.81 m)	191 lb (87 kg)	9 1/2 in (0.24 m)	4.47 s	1.56 s	2.60 s	3.97 s	35.5 in (0.90 m)	9 ft 4 in (2.84 m)	10 reps
All values from NFL Combine

He was drafted by the New York Giants in the third round of the 1988 NFL draft and later played for the Detroit Lions and Cincinnati Bengals before retiring after the 1993 season.

White became a scout for the Lions in 1997 before being promoted to director of pro personnel in 2000. He was further promoted to vice president of pro personnel in 2009. He served as their interim general manager following the firing of Martin Mayhew in 2015. For the latter half of the 2010s, he served as the executive director of player personnel and recruiting for the Michigan State Spartans football team. White served as a scout for the Washington Football Team in 2021 before joining the Pittsburgh Steelers as their director of pro scouting the following year. On June 13, 2026, the Steelers promoted White to the role of senior personnel executive.
