= Joe Marciano =

American football player and coach (born 1954)

Personal information
- Born: February 10, 1954 (age 72); Dunmore, Pennsylvania, U.S.

Career history
- East Stroudsburg (1977) Tight ends coach; Rhode Island (1977–1978) Wide receiver coach; Villanova (1980) Wide receiver coach; Penn State (1981) Tight ends coach; Temple (1982) Special teams coordinator & tight ends coach; Philadelphia Stars (1983–1985) Special teams coordinator & tight ends coach; New Orleans Saints (1986–1994) Special teams coordinator & tight ends coach; New Orleans Saints (1995) Special teams coordinator; Tampa Bay Buccaneers (1996–2001) Special teams coordinator; Houston Texans (2002–2013) Special teams coordinator; Minnesota Vikings (2014) Special teams coordinator; Detroit Lions (2015–2018) Special teams coordinator

Joe Marciano (born February 10, 1954) is an American football coach and former player. He was the special teams coordinator for the Detroit Lions from 2015 until his firing in the mid 2018 season.

== Coaching career ==
=== Tampa Bay Buccaneers ===
In six seasons with Tampa, 10 players received NFC Special Teams Player of the Week honors under Marciano's tutelage.

=== Houston Texans ===
Marciano came to Houston after spending the previous six seasons with the Tampa Bay Buccaneers where he served in the same capacity. The Texans tied three NFL special teams records in 2007 under Marciano, as Houston became the fourth team in NFL history to record four kickoff return touchdowns in a single season. André Davis tied another League record when he returned two kickoffs for touchdowns in one game, becoming only the seventh player in NFL history to do so. Kris Brown became just the third player ever to make three field goals of 50 yards or longer in one game.

=== Minnesota Vikings ===
Marciano served as interim special teams coordinator for the Minnesota Vikings while Mike Priefer was out on a three-week suspension in August 2014.

=== Detroit Lions ===
On February 17, 2015, Marciano was hired as special teams coordinator for the Detroit Lions. During the 2015 season, Sam Martin posted a then-career-career-high single-season net punting average of 42.0, which ranked fourth in the NFL, while Matt Prater converted 22 of his 24 field goal attempts, including 17 in a row to start the season. Prater's 17 consecutive field goals to start the season marked the longest streak to start a season in Lions history. The Detroit Lions fired Marciano as the special teams coordinator during the mid-season of 2018 on November 5, 2018.
