= Isa Abdul-Quddus =

American football player (born 1989)

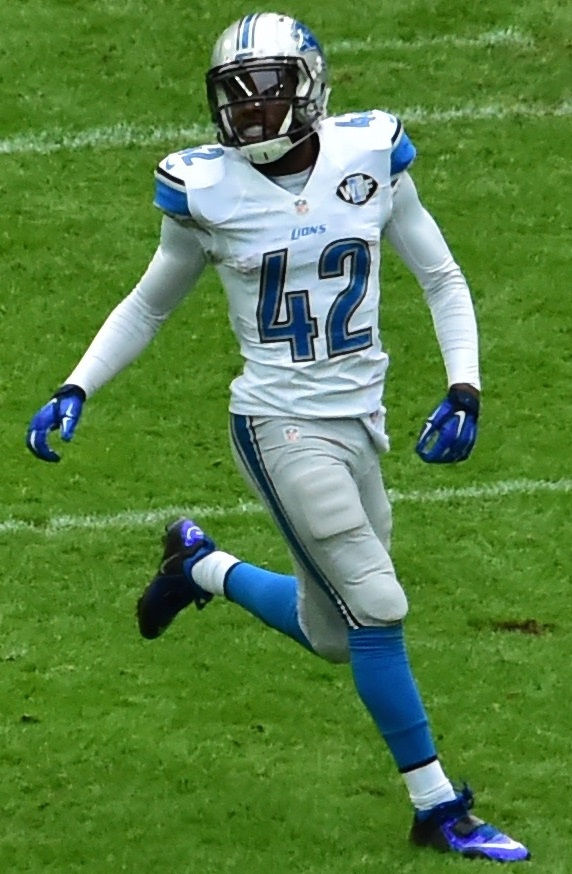
- Abdul-Quddus with the Detroit Lions in 2014

No. 42, 24
- Position: Safety

Personal information
- Born: August 3, 1989 (age 37); Elizabeth, New Jersey, U.S.
- Listed height: 6 ft 1 in (1.85 m)
- Listed weight: 200 lb (91 kg)

Career information
- High school: Union (NJ)
- College: Fordham
- NFL draft: 2011: undrafted

Career history
- New Orleans Saints (2011–2013); Detroit Lions (2014–2015); Miami Dolphins (2016)

Career NFL statistics
- Total tackles: 242
- Sacks: 2
- Forced fumbles: 4
- Fumble recoveries: 1
- Interceptions: 4
- Stats at Pro Football Reference

Isa Abdul-Quddus (born August 3, 1989) is an American former professional football player who was a safety in the National Football League (NFL). He played college football for the Fordham Rams and was signed by the New Orleans Saints as an undrafted free agent in 2011 and also played for the Detroit Lions and Miami Dolphins.

Abdul-Quddus is currently the head football coach at Hillside High School in Hillside, New Jersey.

== Professional career ==
=== New Orleans Saints ===
Abdul-Quddus was signed by the New Orleans Saints as an undrafted rookie free agent following the 2011 NFL draft. On January 7, 2014, Abdul-Quddus was released by the Saints.

=== Detroit Lions ===
Abdul-Quddus was claimed off waivers by the Detroit Lions on February 3, 2014. On March 10, 2015, the Lions re-signed Abdul-Quddus to a one-year contract.

=== Miami Dolphins ===
On March 9, 2016, the Miami Dolphins signed Abdul-Quddus to a three-year contract totaling $12.75 million. He started 15 games in his first season with the Dolphins. He recorded a career-high 78 tackles along with five passes defended, two interceptions, and one sack. He was placed on injured reserve on December 28, after suffering a neck injury in Week 16 against the Buffalo Bills.

On March 9, 2017, Abdul-Quddus was released by the Dolphins.

== NFL career statistics ==
Legend
**Bold**	Career high

=== Regular season ===
Year	Team	Games		Tackles					Interceptions					Fumbles			
Year	Team	GP	GS	Cmb	Solo	Ast	Sck	TFL	Int	Yds	TD	Lng	PD	FF	FR	Yds	TD
2011	NOR	**16**	1	16	14	2	0.0	0	0	0	0	0	1	**3**	0	0	0
2012	NOR	15	3	45	33	12	0.0	0	**2**	12	0	**12**	**8**	0	**1**	0	0
2013	NOR	11	0	13	12	1	0.0	0	0	0	0	0	1	0	0	0	0
2014	DET	**16**	4	33	22	11	0.0	0	0	0	0	0	2	0	0	0	0
2015	DET	**16**	8	57	42	15	**1.0**	**2**	0	0	0	0	6	1	0	0	0
2016	MIA	15	**15**	**78**	**50**	**28**	**1.0**	**2**	**2**	**16**	0	9	5	0	0	0	0
Career		89	31	242	173	69	2.0	4	4	28	0	12	23	4	1	0	0

=== Playoffs ===
Year	Team	Games		Tackles					Interceptions					Fumbles			
Year	Team	GP	GS	Cmb	Solo	Ast	Sck	TFL	Int	Yds	TD	Lng	PD	FF	FR	Yds	TD
2011	NOR	**2**	0	**4**	**4**	0	0.0	**1**	0	0	0	0	0	0	0	0	0
2014	DET	1	0	1	0	**1**	0.0	0	0	0	0	0	0	0	0	0	0
Career		3	0	5	4	1	0.0	1	0	0	0	0	0	0	0	0	0

== Personal life ==
Abdul-Quddus lives in Union, New Jersey, where he attended high school and was a three-year starter for Union High School at safety. He graduated in 2007.
