= Jim Caldwell (American football) =

American football player and coach (born 1955)

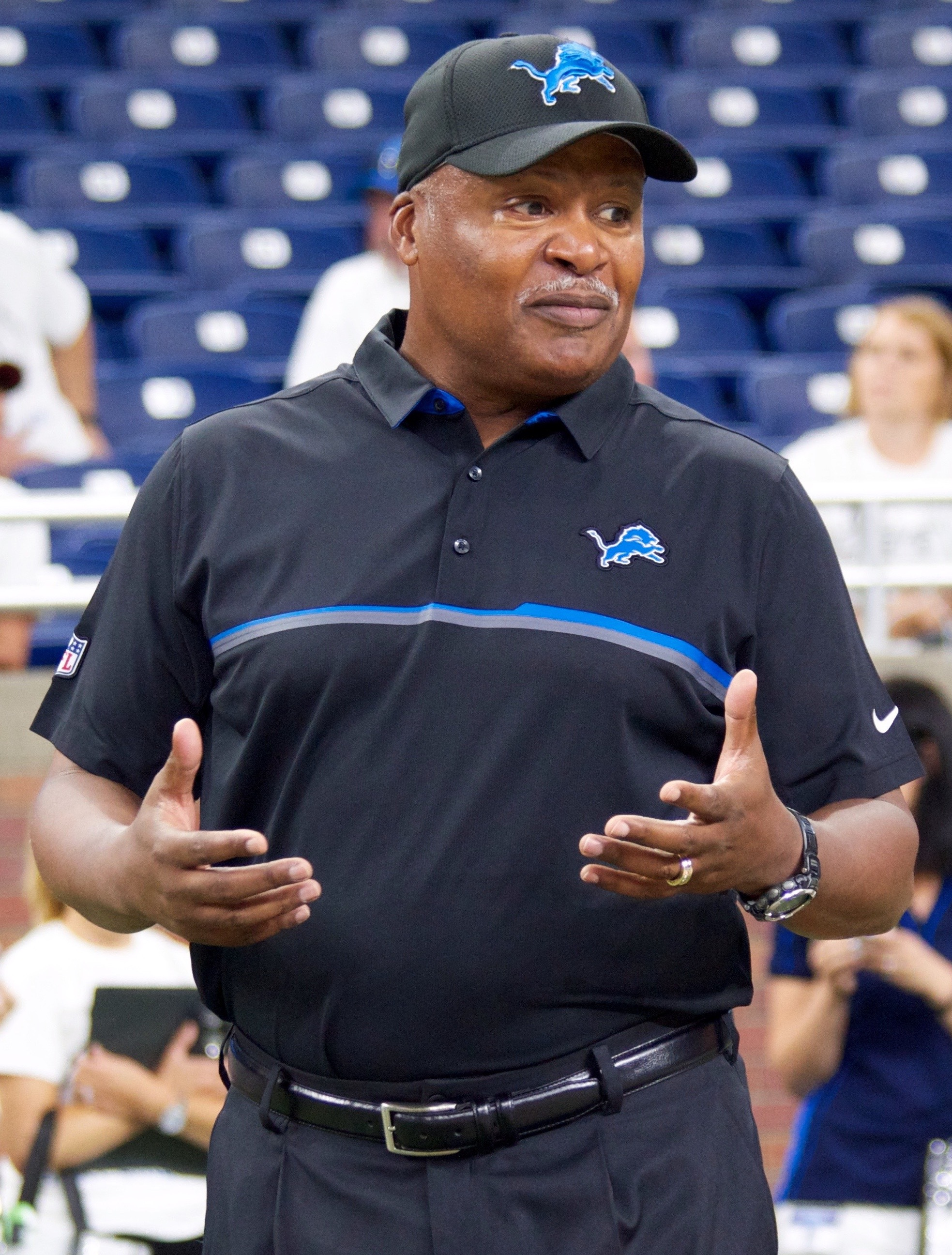
- Caldwell with the Detroit Lions in 2016

Personal information
- Born: January 16, 1955 (age 71); Beloit, Wisconsin, U.S.

Career information
- Position: Cornerback
- High school: Memorial (Beloit)
- College: Iowa (1973–1976)
- NFL draft: 1977: undrafted

Career history
- Iowa (1977) Graduate assistant; Southern Illinois (1978–1980) Wide receivers coach; Northwestern (1981) Offensive assistant; Colorado (1982–1984) Wide receivers coach; Louisville (1985) Wide receivers coach; Penn State (1986–1992) Quarterbacks coach; Wake Forest (1993–2000) Head coach; Tampa Bay Buccaneers (2001) Quarterbacks coach; Indianapolis Colts (2002–2011); Assistant head coach & quarterbacks coach (2002–2008); Head coach (2009–2011); Baltimore Ravens (2012–2013); Quarterbacks coach (2012); Interim offensive coordinator (2012); Offensive coordinator (2013); Detroit Lions (2014–2017) Head coach; Miami Dolphins (2019) Assistant head coach & quarterbacks coach; Carolina Panthers (2023–2025) Senior assistant

Awards and highlights
- 2× Super Bowl champion (XLI, XLVII)

Head coaching record
- Regular season: 62–50 (.554)
- Postseason: 2–4 (.333)
- Career: NCAA: 26–63 (.292); NFL: 64–54 (.542)
- Coaching profile at Pro Football Reference

James Caldwell (born January 16, 1955) is an American football coach who previously served as the head coach of the Indianapolis Colts from 2009 to 2011 and Detroit Lions from 2014 to 2017. As an assistant coach, Caldwell was the assistant head coach and quarterbacks coach for the Colts team that won Super Bowl XLI and the offensive coordinator for the Baltimore Ravens team that won Super Bowl XLVII.

== College career ==
Caldwell attended the University of Iowa, where he was a four-year starter at cornerback for the Iowa Hawkeyes football team from 1973 to 1976. As a freshman in 1973, he set an Iowa single-season record that still stands with five blocked kicks.

== Coaching career ==
=== College ===
Caldwell served as an assistant coach at Iowa, Southern Illinois, Northwestern, Colorado, Louisville, and Penn State before being named head coach at Wake Forest in 1993. He was the first African-American head football coach in the Atlantic Coast Conference (ACC). Caldwell was inducted into Omicron Delta Kappa – The National Leadership Honor Society at Wake Forest in 1996.

In eight years, Caldwell had a record of 26–63. He installed a powerful passing attack that set numerous school records, many of which have since been broken under his successor, Jim Grobe. However, his teams rarely ran well; in one year the Demon Deacons' leading rusher only notched 300 yards for the entire season. He only had one winning season, in 1999, when the Deacons won the Aloha Bowl.

=== Indianapolis Colts ===
Caldwell joined Tony Dungy's staff with the Tampa Bay Buccaneers in 2001 as quarterbacks coach. He followed Dungy to Indianapolis in 2002 and remained with him for his entire tenure, helping lead the Colts to a win in Super Bowl XLI.

On January 13, 2008, Caldwell was formally announced as Dungy's successor. On January 12, 2009, Dungy announced his retirement, putting Caldwell in the head coaching position. He was formally introduced at a press conference the following day.

Caldwell had one of the best debut seasons for a head coach in NFL history, finishing with a 14–2 record. The Colts rushed out to a 14–0 start. With the AFC South title and the top seed in the AFC playoffs secured, Caldwell opted (on orders from then general manager, Bill Polian) to sit out his starting players the last two games of the season (both losses), drawing controversy to him and the team. He later won his first playoff game against the Baltimore Ravens on January 16, 2010. On January 24, 2010, Caldwell became the fifth rookie head coach to lead his team to the Super Bowl after securing a 30–17 win against the New York Jets in the AFC Championship Game. On February 7, 2010, Caldwell's rookie season ended with a 31–17 loss in Super Bowl XLIV to the New Orleans Saints.

Caldwell shares the NFL record for the best start by a rookie head coach, starting his career with 14 wins. George Seifert led the San Francisco 49ers to 14 wins as a rookie head coach in 1989. The 14 wins also tied a Colts franchise record.

In his second season the Colts posted a 10–6 record but maintained the division title in the AFC South. They lost their first game in the playoffs to the New York Jets, 17–16, on January 8, 2011, marking the end of the Peyton Manning era in Indianapolis.

The 2011 season, however, saw the Colts sink to 2–14. Starting quarterback Peyton Manning missed the entire season due to undergoing neck surgeries and without him the Colts appeared to be a rudderless team. Caldwell was fired after the season. The league-worst record however, gave the Colts the No. 1 pick in the 2012 NFL draft, which they would end up using to draft Stanford quarterback Andrew Luck.

=== Baltimore Ravens ===
Thirteen days after his dismissal from the Indianapolis Colts, Caldwell was named quarterbacks coach by the Baltimore Ravens on January 30, 2012. On December 10, 2012, the Ravens dismissed Cam Cameron and named Caldwell the offensive coordinator. On the day after defeating the New England Patriots in the AFC championship game, head coach John Harbaugh announced on January 22, 2013, that Caldwell would be the team's permanent offensive coordinator going into the 2013 season. On February 3, 2013, Caldwell helped lead the Ravens to a 34–31 victory over the San Francisco 49ers in Super Bowl XLVII at the Mercedes-Benz Superdome.

=== Detroit Lions ===
On January 14, 2014, the Detroit Lions announced Caldwell as their new head coach. He was the first African American to hold the position for the Lions.

In Caldwell's first season with the Lions, they posted an 11–5 record and made the playoffs as a wild card. They were defeated in the first round by the Dallas Cowboys, losing by a score of 24–20.

Halfway through the 2015 season, the Lions had struggled to a 1–7 record, and both team president Tom Lewand and general manager Martin Mayhew were fired. There was speculation that Caldwell would soon be fired as well, but the next week the Lions won a road game against the Green Bay Packers for the first time since 1991. Ultimately, Detroit won 6 of their final 8 games to finish the season with a 7–9 record, and Caldwell retained his job.

In 2016, Caldwell's third season in Detroit, the Lions improved to a 9–7 record and lost to the Packers in a Week 17 game that determined the winner of NFC North. The Lions clinched another wild card berth, but lost in the first round to the Seattle Seahawks, 26–6.

The Lions went 9–7 again in 2017, in a season widely considered a disappointment despite the Lions' winning record. After the Lions missed the playoffs following a mediocre performance in the second half of the season, there was speculation about Caldwell's future, given the team's performance and belief that Lions general manager Bob Quinn, who was hired during Caldwell's second year, may have wanted to bring in a coach from his former team, the New England Patriots. Subsequently, on January 1, 2018, the day after the season ended, Caldwell was fired by the Lions. He was succeeded by Patriots defensive coordinator Matt Patricia the following month. The firing of Caldwell drew retrospective contention due to the team not improving beyond wild card contention during his tenure, but regressing under Patricia.

Caldwell's record as Lions coach was 36–28 (.563), making him the first non-interim Lions coach to leave the team with a winning record since Joe Schmidt, who led the team from 1967 to 1972. His .563 winning percentage was also the best for a Lions' head coach since Buddy Parker in the 1950s.

=== XFL ===
After being released from Detroit at the end of the 2017 NFL season, Caldwell was hired by the reincarnated XFL to a consulting panel that addressed football rules for the league.

Caldwell was interviewed in December 2018 by the Green Bay Packers for their open head coach position that was previously held by Mike McCarthy until being let go mid-season in 2018. Caldwell also interviewed for head coaching vacancies with the New York Jets and the Cleveland Browns.

=== Miami Dolphins ===
After the Miami Dolphins hired Brian Flores as their new head coach, Caldwell was hired to Flores' staff as assistant head coach and quarterbacks coach on February 8, 2019. On July 13, 2019, it was announced Caldwell would take a leave of absence to address health issues, but remained as a consultant. Following the 2019 season, Caldwell was not retained by the Dolphins.

On January 4, 2022, Caldwell interviewed to become the next head coach of the Jacksonville Jaguars. On January 15, he completed an interview for the head coaching job at the Chicago Bears. He was later interviewed for a second time by new general manager Ryan Poles on January 25.

Caldwell not receiving another head coaching opportunity since 2017, along with his dismissals from the Colts and Lions, were cited by Flores as examples of the league's alleged racial discrimination in his 2022 class-action lawsuit against the NFL.

=== Carolina Panthers ===
On January 9, 2023, Caldwell was interviewed as a candidate for the Carolina Panthers' head coach position. On February 14, Caldwell was named a senior assistant for the Panthers under new head coach Frank Reich.

On May 18, 2026, it was announced that Caldwell was no longer a part of the team's coaching staff.

== Family ==
Caldwell and his wife, Cheryl, have four children: Jimmy, Jermaine, Jared and Natalie.

== Head coaching record ==
=== College ===
Year	Team	Overall	Conference	Standing	Bowl/playoffs
Wake Forest Demon Deacons (Atlantic Coast Conference) (1993–2000)
1993	Wake Forest	2–9	1–7	9th	
1994	Wake Forest	3–8	1–7	8th	
1995	Wake Forest	1–10	0–8	9th	
1996	Wake Forest	3–8	1–7	8th	
1997	Wake Forest	5–6	3–5	7th	
1998	Wake Forest	3–8	2–6	7th	
1999	Wake Forest	7–5	3–5	5th	W Aloha
2000	Wake Forest	2–9	1–7	8th	
Wake Forest:		26–63	12–52		
Total:		26–63			

=== NFL ===
Team	Year	Regular season					Postseason			
Team	Year	Won	Lost	Ties	Win %	Finish	Won	Lost	Win %	Result
IND	2009	14	2	0	.875	1st in AFC South	2	1	.667	Lost to New Orleans Saints in Super Bowl XLIV
IND	2010	10	6	0	.625	1st in AFC South	0	1	.000	Lost to New York Jets in AFC wild card game
IND	2011	2	14	0	.125	4th in AFC South	–	–	–	–
IND total		26	22	0	.542		2	2	.500	
DET	2014	11	5	0	.688	2nd in NFC North	0	1	.000	Lost to Dallas Cowboys in NFC Wild Card Game
DET	2015	7	9	0	.438	3rd in NFC North	–	–	–	–
DET	2016	9	7	0	.563	2nd in NFC North	0	1	.000	Lost to Seattle Seahawks in NFC Wild Card Game
DET	2017	9	7	0	.563	2nd in NFC North	–	–	–	–
DET total		36	28	0	.563		0	2	.000	-
Total		62	50	0	.554		2	4	.333	
