= Jeremiah Washburn =

American football player and coach (born 1977)

Philadelphia Eagles
- Title: Defensive ends & outside linebackers coach

Personal information
- Born: June 17, 1977 (age 49); Shelby, North Carolina, U.S.

Career information
- College: Arkansas

Career history
- Detroit Lions (2009–2012) Assistant offensive line coach; Detroit Lions (2013–2015) Offensive line coach; Miami Dolphins (2016) Assistant offensive line coach; Chicago Bears (2017) Offensive line coach; Miami Dolphins (2018) Offensive line coach; Philadelphia Eagles (2021–2022) Senior defensive assistant; Philadelphia Eagles (2023–present) Defensive ends & outside linebackers coach

Awards and highlights
- Super Bowl champion (LIX)

Jeremiah Washburn (born June 17, 1977) is an American football coach and former player who is the defensive ends and outside linebackers coach for the Philadelphia Eagles of the National Football League (NFL). He previously served as an assistant coach for the Detroit Lions, Miami Dolphins, and Chicago Bears. Washburn played college football at Arkansas.

== Early life ==
Washburn attended Shelby High School in Shelby, North Carolina, and earned All-Southwestern 3A Conference honors as a junior in 1993. He then attended Fayetteville High School during his senior year. He played college football at Arkansas. He then served as a graduate assistant at Arkansas for two years.

== Coaching career ==
=== Detroit Lions ===
On May 2, 2009, Washburn was named an assistant offensive line coach for the Detroit Lions. On January 14, 2013, he was promoted to offensive line coach for the 2013 NFL season. His dad, Jim, joined the Lions' coaching staff later that month as a defensive assistant. He was fired by the Lions on October 26, 2015, along with offensive coordinator Joe Lombardi and assistant line coach Terry Heffernan.

=== Miami Dolphins ===
On January 19, 2016, he was named an assistant offensive line coach for the Miami Dolphins. On January 4, 2018, he re-joined the Dolphins as an offensive line coach.

=== Chicago Bears ===
On January 19, 2017, he was named an offensive line coach for the Chicago Bears for the 2017 NFL season.

=== Philadelphia Eagles ===
On February 25, 2019, he was hired as an advanced projects coordinator for the Philadelphia Eagles. On February 7, 2020, he was promoted to director of player personnel/senior defensive assistant. During the 2022 season, the Eagles posted a franchise-record 70 sacks as a team. This was the third-most in NFL history, behind the 1984 Chicago Bears (72) and the 1989 Minnesota Vikings (71). On February 8, 2023, he was named defensive ends and outside linebackers coach. During the 2024 season, he helped the Eagles win Super Bowl LIX.

== Personal life ==
Washburn is the son of former NFL defensive line coach Jim Washburn. He and his wife, Susan, have two daughters, Ally and Megan, and a son, Drew.
