= Kevin Snyder =

American football player (born 1992)

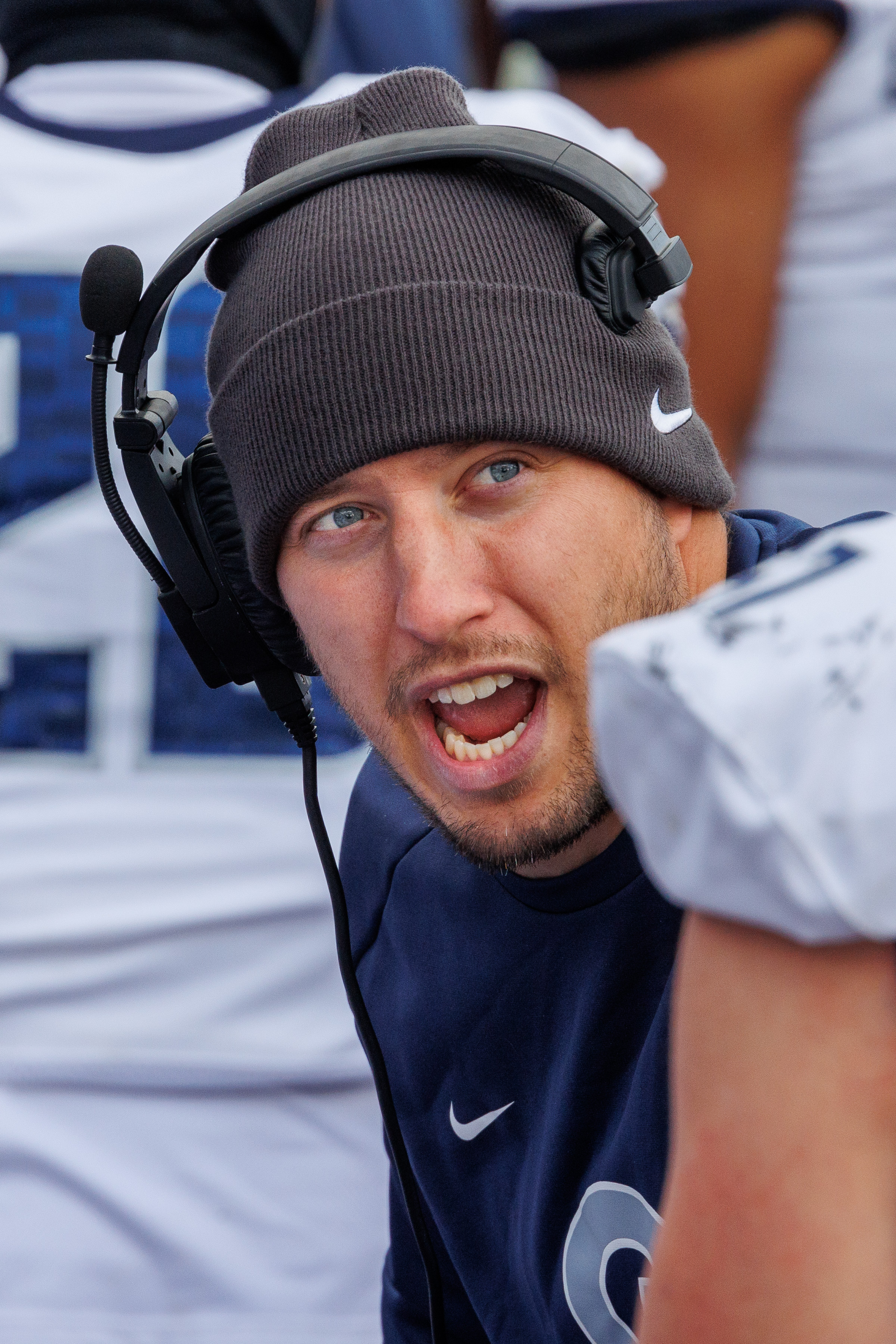
- Coaching at Georgetown, 2023

Kent State Golden Flashes
- Title: Linebackers coach

Personal information
- Born: July 25, 1992 (age 34); Harrisburg, Pennsylvania, U.S.
- Listed height: 6 ft 2 in (1.88 m)
- Listed weight: 245 lb (111 kg)

Career information
- High school: Cumberland Valley (Mechanicsburg, Pennsylvania)
- College: Rutgers
- NFL draft: 2015: undrafted

Career history

Playing
- Detroit Lions (2015); San Francisco 49ers (2015)*; New England Patriots (2015); Denver Broncos (2016–2017); Arizona Cardinals (2017)*
- * Offseason or practice squad member only

Coaching
- Rutgers (2020) Player development assistant; Wake Forest (2021–2022) Graduate assistant; Georgetown (2023–2024) Defensive line coach; Kent State (2024–present) Linebackers coach
- Stats at Pro Football Reference

Kevin Snyder (born July 25, 1992) is an American former professional football player who was a linebacker in the National Football League (NFL). He played college football for the Rutgers Scarlet Knights.

== College career ==
Snyder played at the middle, weak-side, and strong-side linebacker positions for the Rutgers Scarlet Knights football team. In a four-year career, Snyder had 229 total tackles, 6½ sacks, one forced fumble, one fumble recovery and 10 pass defenses. He was also the team's back-up long snapper.

Snyder, a member of the Big Ten and Big East All-Academic teams during his playing career at Rutgers, majored in economics. He was also a member of the National College Athlete Honor Society.

== Professional career ==
=== Detroit Lions ===
After going undrafted in the 2015 NFL draft, Snyder signed with the Detroit Lions on May 2, 2015. He broke his hand in the Lions' second preseason game against the Washington Redskins and was subsequently placed on injured reserve. He was released from the injured reserve list on October 13.

=== San Francisco 49ers ===
Snyder was signed to the San Francisco 49ers practice squad on November 24, 2015. He was waived on December 1.

=== New England Patriots ===
Snyder was signed to the New England Patriots practice squad on December 16, 2015. In the week leading up to the AFC Championship Game, Snyder was promoted to the Patriots' active 53-man roster. He was active for the game, but did not play any snaps.

On September 3, 2016, Snyder was waived/injured by the Patriots and was placed on injured reserve after clearing waivers. On September 8, 2016, Snyder was released by the Patriots with an injury settlement.

=== Denver Broncos ===
On December 15, 2016, Snyder was signed to the Broncos' practice squad. He signed a reserve/future contract with the Broncos on January 2, 2017.

On September 2, 2017, Snyder was waived by the Broncos. He was re-signed to the Broncos' practice squad on October 24, 2017. He was promoted to the active roster on October 28, 2017. He was waived on November 7, 2017.

=== Arizona Cardinals ===
On November 27, 2017, Snyder was signed to the Arizona Cardinals' practice squad. He was released on December 19, 2017.

== Coaching career ==
In 2020, Snyder returned to his alma mater Rutgers as a player development assistant, then spent two years at Wake Forest University as an outside linebacker and defensive end graduate assistant. In March 2023, Snyder joined the Georgetown Hoyas as a defensive line assistant coach. In January 2025, Snyder was hired to be the linebacker coach for the Kent State Golden Flashes where he is currently serving.
