= Gabe Wright =

American football player (born 1992)

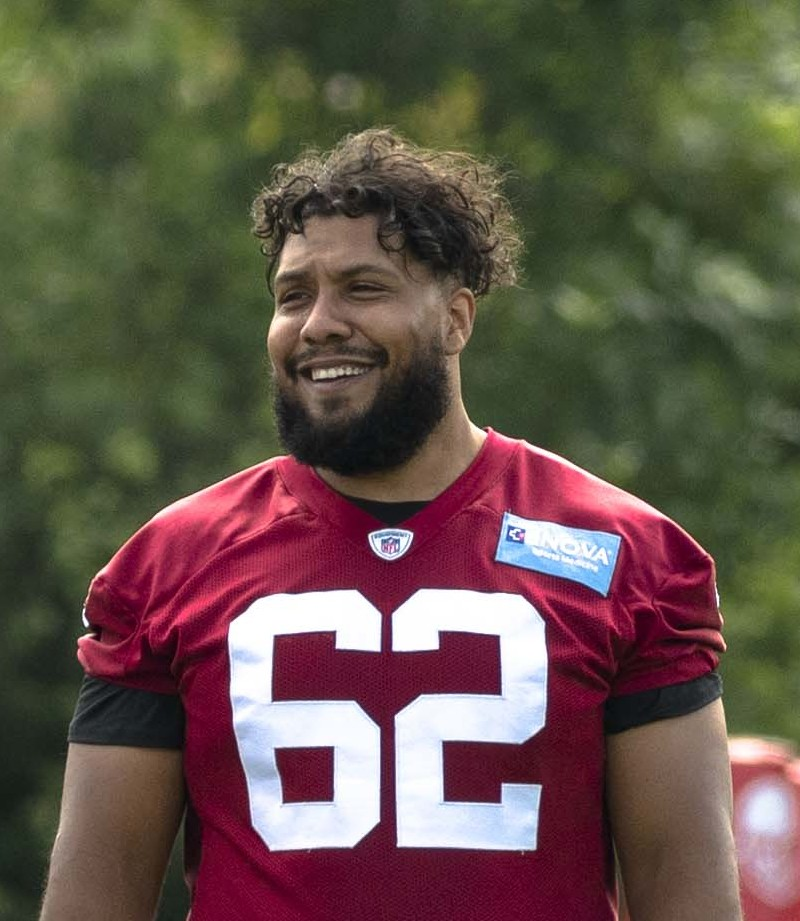
- Wright with the Washington Football Team in 2021

No. 90, 97, 98, 57
- Position: Defensive tackle

Personal information
- Born: April 3, 1992 (age 34); Columbus, Georgia, U.S.
- Listed height: 6 ft 3 in (1.91 m)
- Listed weight: 305 lb (138 kg)

Career information
- High school: Carver (Columbus)
- College: Auburn
- NFL draft: 2015: 4th round, 113th overall pick

Career history
- Detroit Lions (2015); Cleveland Browns (2016); Philadelphia Eagles (2017)*; Miami Dolphins (2017); Oakland Raiders (2018); Houston Roughnecks (2020); Jacksonville Jaguars (2020–2021)*; Washington Football Team (2021)*; DC Defenders (2023)
- * Offseason or practice squad member only

Career NFL statistics
- Total tackles: 12
- Stats at Pro Football Reference

Gabriel Alexander Wright (born April 3, 1992) is an American former professional football player who was a defensive tackle in the National Football League (NFL). He played college football for the Auburn Tigers and was selected by the Detroit Lions in the fourth round of the 2015 NFL draft.

== Professional career ==
Pre-draft measurables
Height	Weight	Arm length	Hand span	40-yard dash	10-yard split	20-yard split	20-yard shuttle	Three-cone drill	Vertical jump	Broad jump	Bench press
6 ft 2 3/4 in (1.90 m)	300 lb (136 kg)	32 5/8 in (0.83 m)	10 3/4 in (0.27 m)	5.07 s	1.78 s	2.96 s	4.56 s	7.73 s	26.5 in (0.67 m)	8 ft 4 in (2.54 m)	34 reps
All values from NFL Combine

=== Detroit Lions ===
Wright was drafted by the Detroit Lions in the fourth round (113th overall) of the 2015 NFL draft after playing college football for the Auburn Tigers. The Lions traded up for the pick, giving away their 2016 third-round pick to the Philadelphia Eagles. On September 3, 2016, he was waived by the Lions.

=== Cleveland Browns ===
On September 5, 2016, Wright was signed to the practice squad of the Cleveland Browns. On September 13, he was promoted to the Browns' active roster. Wright was released by Cleveland on October 4 and was re-signed to the practice squad the following day. He was elevated back to the active roster on October 11. Wright was released again on October 21 and re-signed back to the practice squad a few days later. Wright was re-signed back to the active roster again on December 13.

On May 19, 2017, Wright was waived by the Browns.

=== Philadelphia Eagles ===
On June 5, 2017, Wright was signed by the Philadelphia Eagles. He was waived by the team on September 1.

=== Miami Dolphins ===
On September 4, 2017, Wright was signed to the Miami Dolphins' practice squad. He was promoted to the active roster on December 28.

On August 14, 2018, Wright was released by the Dolphins.

=== Oakland Raiders ===
On August 15, 2018, Wright was claimed off waivers by the Oakland Raiders. He was waived by Oakland on September 1, and was re–signed to the practice squad the next day. Wright was released again on September 14, but was re-signed five days later. He was promoted to the active roster on December 18.

Wright was waived by Oakland as a part of final roster cuts on August 30, 2019.

=== Houston Roughnecks ===
On November 22, 2019, Wright was drafted by the Houston Roughnecks in the 2020 XFL Supplemental Draft. In 5 games for the undefeated Roughnecks, Wright produced 10 tackles and 1.5 sacks. He had his contract terminated when the league suspended operations on April 10, 2020.

=== Jacksonville Jaguars ===
On December 7, 2020, Wright signed with the practice squad of the Jacksonville Jaguars. He signed a reserve/future contract with the Jaguars on January 4, 2021. Wright was waived by Jacksonville on March 17.

=== Washington Football Team ===
Wright signed with the Washington Football Team on June 7, 2021. He was released by the Football Team on August 31, and was re-signed to the practice squad the following day. Wright was released by Washington on September 28. He was again re–signed to the team's practice squad on November 16.

=== DC Defenders ===
Wright was placed on the reserve list by the DC Defenders of the XFL on March 7, 2023. He was activated a week later. He was not part of the roster after the 2024 UFL dispersal draft on January 15, 2024.
