= Joe Lombardi =

American football player and coach (born 1971)

Baltimore Ravens
- Title: Senior offensive assistant

Personal information
- Born: June 6, 1971 (age 55); Seattle, Washington, U.S.

Career information
- Position: Tight end
- High school: Seattle (WA) Seattle Preparatory
- College: Air Force Academy

Career history
- Dayton (1996–1998) Defensive line coach; VMI (1999) Tight ends coach & offensive tackles coach; Bucknell (2000) Defensive line coach & strength and conditioning coach; New York/New Jersey Hitmen (2001) Tight ends coach & running backs coach; Mercyhurst (2002–2005) Offensive coordinator & quarterbacks coach; Atlanta Falcons (2006) Defensive assistant; New Orleans Saints (2007–2008) Offensive assistant; New Orleans Saints (2009–2013) Quarterbacks coach; Detroit Lions (2014–2015) Offensive coordinator; New Orleans Saints (2016–2020) Quarterbacks coach; Los Angeles Chargers (2021–2022) Offensive coordinator; Denver Broncos (2023–2025) Offensive coordinator; Baltimore Ravens (2026–present) Senior offensive assistant

Awards and highlights
- Super Bowl champion (XLIV)
- Coaching profile at Pro Football Reference

Joseph Philip Lombardi (born June 6, 1971) is an American professional football coach and former player who currently serves as a senior offensive assistant for the Baltimore Ravens of the National Football League (NFL). He previously served as the offensive coordinator of the Denver Broncos, Detroit Lions, and Los Angeles Chargers. Lombardi also previously served as an assistant coach for the Atlanta Falcons. He is the grandson of Pro Football Hall of Fame Coach Vince Lombardi.

== Early life ==
A 1994 graduate of the United States Air Force Academy, Lombardi played tight end for the Falcons under head coach Fisher DeBerry. He lettered three seasons and started as a senior; he also lettered a season in lacrosse. He served his four years on active duty in the Air Force, where he was a program manager on the F-22 program at Wright-Patterson Air Force Base in Dayton, Ohio. In the last two years of his military time, he juggled his football and Air Force schedules as he was a volunteer coach at Dayton.

== Coaching career ==
=== Early career ===
Prior to coaching in the NFL, Lombardi coached at the college level at Mercyhurst University (Formerly Mercyhurst College), Bucknell University, the Virginia Military Institute, and the University of Dayton. He coached for the New York/New Jersey Hitmen during the one year of the XFL.

=== Atlanta Falcons ===
In 2006, Lombardi was hired by the Atlanta Falcons as a defensive assistant under head coach Jim Mora.

=== New Orleans Saints ===
In 2007, Lombardi was hired by the New Orleans Saints as an offensive assistant and was promoted to quarterbacks coach in 2009 and the Saints would go on to win the Super Bowl that season. During his time in New Orleans, starting quarterback Drew Brees set numerous passing records, including passing for more than 5,000 yards five times (four times with Lombardi as quarterbacks coach), and setting the record (now surpassed) for the most passing yards in a single season (5,476 in 2011).

=== Detroit Lions ===
In 2014, Lombardi was hired by the Detroit Lions as their offensive coordinator under head coach Jim Caldwell. On October 26, 2015, he was fired by the Lions, along with several other members of the coaching staff, after a 1–6 start to the season.

=== New Orleans Saints (second stint) ===
In 2016, Lombardi was re-hired by the New Orleans Saints as their quarterbacks coach.

=== Los Angeles Chargers ===
On January 25, 2021, Lombardi was hired by the Los Angeles Chargers as their offensive coordinator under head coach Brandon Staley. He was fired on January 17, 2023, following an NFL Wild Card loss to the Jacksonville Jaguars where the Chargers lost despite a 27-point lead at one point during the 2nd quarter. He was strongly criticized during the season as causing a talented offense to regress and limiting the performance of quarterback Justin Herbert.

=== Denver Broncos ===
On February 25, 2023, the Denver Broncos announced the hiring of Lombardi as their offensive coordinator, reuniting him with the Broncos' new head coach Sean Payton. While Payton was the play caller, Lombardi served as his consultant from the coaches' booth during games.

Lombardi was fired on January 27, 2026, days after the Broncos lost in the AFC Championship Game.

=== Baltimore Ravens ===
Shortly after his firing by the Broncos, Lombardi was hired by the Baltimore Ravens on February 3, 2026, as a senior offensive assistant.

== Personal life ==
Lombardi is the grandson of Hall of Fame coach Vince Lombardi, who died the year before he was born, and son of Vince Lombardi Jr. The youngest of four siblings, Lombardi also lived in Washington, New York, and Michigan. Lombardi played high school football at Seattle Prep, and graduated in 1990.

Lombardi and his wife Molly have four sons and three daughters.
