= Jim Washburn =

American football coach (born 1949)

Personal information
- Born: December 2, 1949 (age 76); Shelby, North Carolina, U.S.

Career information
- College: Gardner–Webb

Career history
- SMU (1976) Graduate assistant; Lees–McRae (1977–1978) Defensive coordinator; Livingstone (1979) Defensive coordinator; New Mexico (1980–1982) Defensive line coach; South Carolina (1983–1988) Defensive line coach; Charlotte Barons (1990) Head coach; London Monarchs (1991) Defensive line coach; London Monarchs (1992) Defensive coordinator; Charlotte Rage (1993) Assistant coach; Arkansas (1994–1997) Defensive line coach; Houston (1998) Defensive line coach; Tennessee Titans (1999–2010) Defensive line coach; Philadelphia Eagles (2011–2012) Defensive line coach; Detroit Lions (2013–2015) Assistant defensive line coach; Miami Dolphins (2016–2017) Senior defensive assistant; Cleveland Browns (2023) Defensive consultant

Jim Washburn (born December 2, 1949) is an American football coach. He was the assistant defensive line coach for the Detroit Lions from 2013 to 2015, defensive line coach for the Philadelphia Eagles of the National Football League and the Tennessee Titans' defensive line coach from 1999 to 2010.

== Coaching career ==
Washburn was hired by the Tennessee Titans as their defensive line coach in 1999. During his 12-year tenure with the Titans, the team ranked seventh in sacks with 474 and fifth in run defense thanks to Washburn's defensive line.

Washburn agreed to a three-year contract as the Philadelphia Eagles' defensive line coach on January 19, 2011. Washburn was fired by the Eagles on December 3, 2012, following a Sunday night loss to the Dallas Cowboys that extended the team's 2012 losing streak to eight games.

On January 22, 2013, Washburn was hired by the Detroit Lions as a defensive assistant. His son, Jeremiah, was the offensive line coach for the Lions until 2015.

== Steroid scandal ==
While coaching at the University of South Carolina, Washburn was embroiled in a steroid scandal that resulted in his (and three other assistant coaches) indictment. Washburn pled guilty, and was sentenced to three months in a halfway house and given a three-year probationary term.
