= Michael Burton (American football) =

American football player (born 1992)

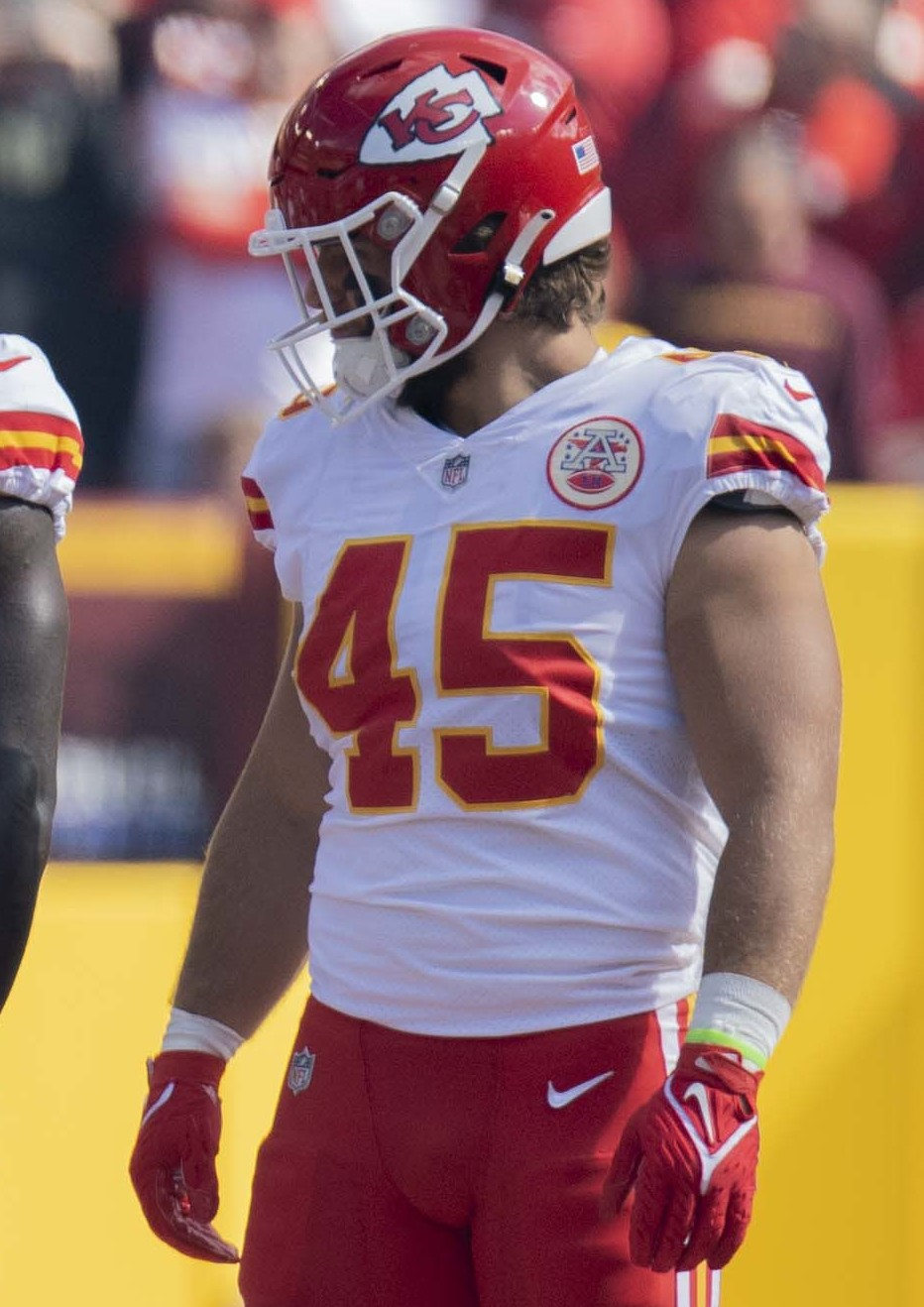
- Burton with the Kansas City Chiefs in 2021

No. 34 – Cleveland Browns
- Position: Fullback
- Roster status: Injured reserve

Personal information
- Born: February 1, 1992 (age 34); Long Valley, New Jersey, U.S.
- Listed height: 6 ft 0 in (1.83 m)
- Listed weight: 247 lb (112 kg)

Career information
- High school: West Morris Central (Washington Township, New Jersey)
- College: Rutgers (2011–2014)
- NFL draft: 2015: 5th round, 168th overall pick

Career history
- Detroit Lions (2015–2016); Chicago Bears (2017–2018); New Orleans Saints (2019)*; Washington Redskins (2019); New Orleans Saints (2020); Kansas City Chiefs (2021–2022); Denver Broncos (2023–2025); Cleveland Browns (2026–present)
- * Offseason or practice squad member only

Awards and highlights
- Super Bowl champion (LVII)

Career NFL statistics as of Week 10, 2026
- Rushing yards: 81
- Rushing average: 1.9
- Rushing touchdowns: 2
- Receptions: 31
- Receiving yards: 196
- Receiving touchdowns: 2
- Stats at Pro Football Reference

Michael Burton (born February 1, 1992) is an American professional football fullback for the Cleveland Browns of the National Football League (NFL). He played college football for the Rutgers Scarlet Knights, and was selected by the Detroit Lions in the fifth round of the 2015 NFL draft. He has also played for the Chicago Bears, New Orleans Saints, Washington Redskins, Kansas City Chiefs, and Denver Broncos.

Burton has mainly played fullback throughout his career, although he has also played running back, particularly as a pass protector and short yardage back.

== Early life ==
Burton attended and played high school football at West Morris Central High School in Washington Township , New Jersey.

== College career ==
Burton played college football at Rutgers from 2011 to 2014. In the 2011 season, he had 10 carries for 44 rushing yards to go along with 10 receptions for 68 receiving yards and a receiving touchdown. In the 2012 season, he had three receptions for 34 receiving yards in four games. In the 2013 season, he had 19 receptions for 149 receiving yards and two receiving touchdowns. In his final collegiate season in 2014, he had 15 receptions for 150 receiving yards.

== Professional career ==
Pre-draft measurables
Height	Weight	Arm length	Hand span	Wingspan	40-yard dash	10-yard split	20-yard split	20-yard shuttle	Three-cone drill	Vertical jump	Broad jump	Bench press
5 ft 11 1/4 in (1.81 m)	242 lb (110 kg)	29 1/4 in (0.74 m)	9 1/2 in (0.24 m)	5 ft 11 3/4 in (1.82 m)	4.74 s	1.65 s	2.75 s	4.28 s	7.08 s	33.0 in (0.84 m)	9 ft 8 in (2.95 m)	30 reps
All values from NFL Combine/Pro Day

=== Detroit Lions ===
Burton was selected by the Detroit Lions in the fifth round (168th overall) of the 2015 NFL draft. On May 12, 2015, the Lions signed Burton to a four-year, $2.46 million contract with a signing bonus of $184,356.

He entered training camp competing with Emil Igwenagu to be the Detroit Lions' starting fullback. He won the job and was named their starting fullback to begin the regular season. He made his professional regular season debut and first career start in the Lions' season-opener against the San Diego Chargers. The next game, Burton had his first career carry for a two-yard gain in a 16–26 loss to the Minnesota Vikings. On October 5, 2015, he made his first career catch on a three-yard pass from Matt Stafford and finished the 10–13 loss to the Seattle Seahawks with one carry for no yards and one catch for three yards. On December 21, 2015, Burton caught his first career touchdown on a four-yard pass from Stafford and finished the 35–27 win over the New Orleans Saints with two receptions for ten yards and one touchdown.

He finished his rookie season with four carries for two rushing yards and six receptions for 39 receiving yards and a touchdown, while starting seven games and appearing in all 16.

In the 2016 season Burton played in 15 games for the Lions. He recorded one tackle on special teams and did not record any statistics on offense.

On May 30, 2017, Burton was waived by the Lions.

=== Chicago Bears ===
Burton with the Chicago Bears in 2018

Burton was claimed off waivers by the Chicago Bears on May 31, 2017.

On September 10, 2017, in his Bears debut, Burton had one rush for seven yards in the 23–17 home loss to the Atlanta Falcons at Soldier Field. On the 2017 season, he appeared in 16 games and started three.

In the 2018 season, Burton played in eight games with one start, mostly working as a blocking back.

=== New Orleans Saints (first stint) ===
On May 13, 2019, Burton signed with the New Orleans Saints. He was released on August 31, 2019.

=== Washington Redskins ===
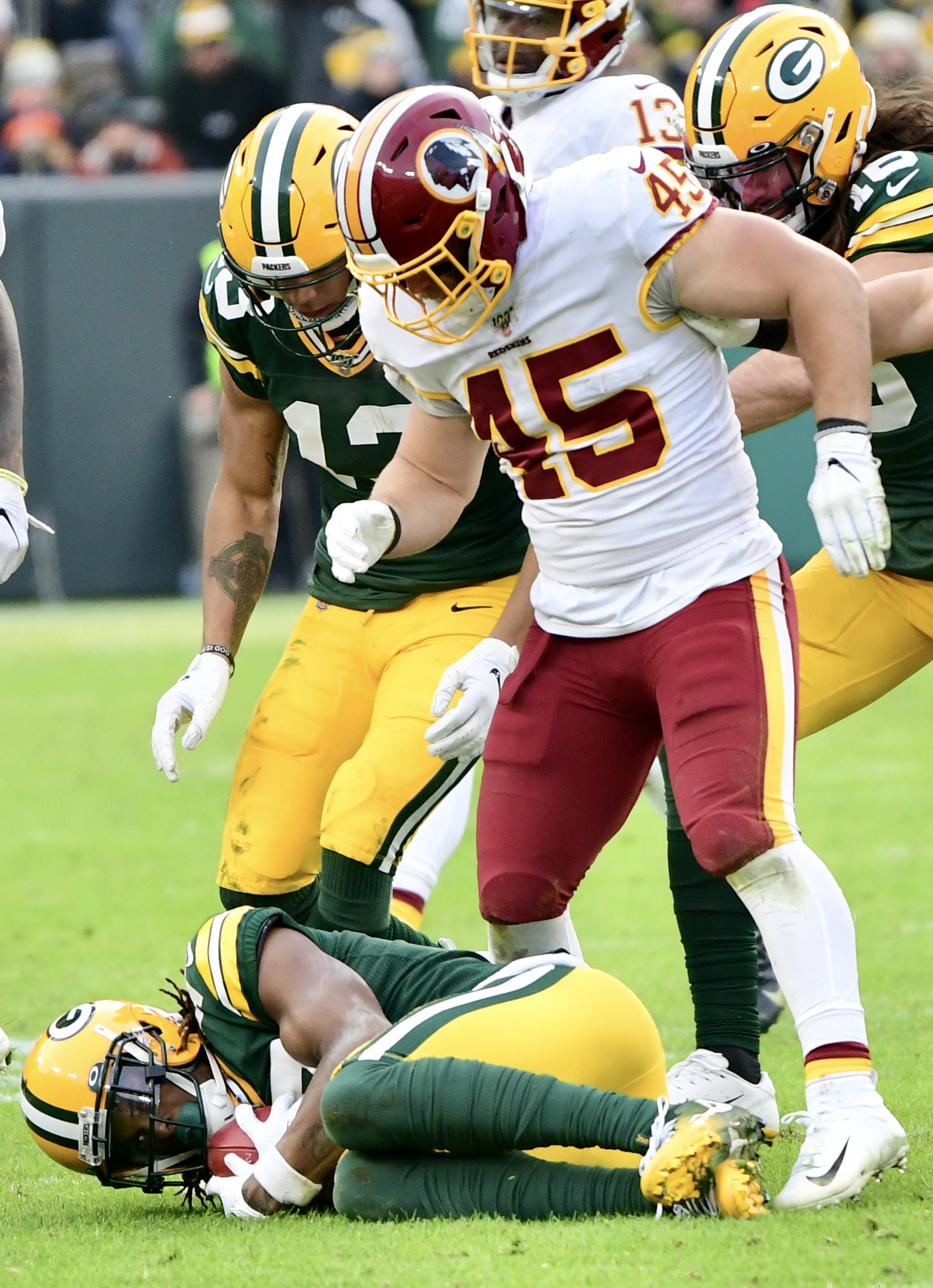
Burton (#45) playing for the Washington Redskins in 2019

Burton signed with the Washington Redskins on October 15, 2019. In the 2019 season, he appeared in ten games and started two.

=== New Orleans Saints (second stint) ===
On March 23, 2020, Burton signed a one-year contract with the Saints. He was placed on the reserve/COVID-19 list by the team on January 2, 2021, and activated on January 6. In the 2020 season, he appeared in 15 games and started four.

=== Kansas City Chiefs ===
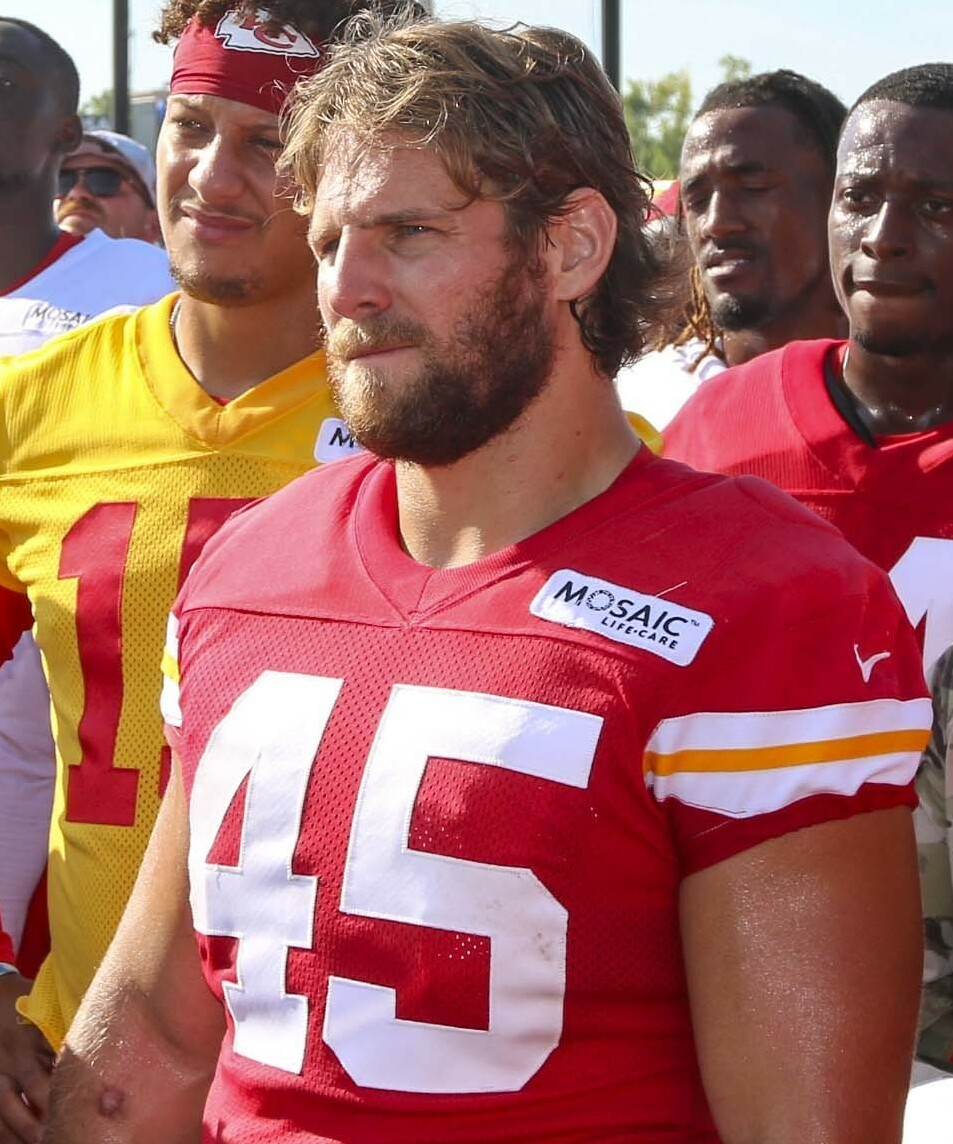
Burton in 2022

Burton signed with the Kansas City Chiefs on April 5, 2021. In the Chiefs week 15 game against the Chargers, he scored his first career rushing touchdown on a seven-yard run. In the 2021 season, he appeared in 16 regular season games and three postseason games for the Chiefs.

On March 21, 2022, Burton re-signed with the Chiefs on a one-year deal for an undisclosed amount. In the 2022 season, Burton appeared in all 17 regular season games and the three postseason games for the Chiefs. Burton won Super Bowl LVII when the Chiefs defeated the Philadelphia Eagles 38–35.

=== Denver Broncos ===
On March 17, 2023, the Denver Broncos signed Burton to a one-year contract. Burton appeared in all 17 games as a fullback and special teamer.

On March 13, 2024, Burton signed a one-year contract extension with the Broncos. On August 27, the Broncos released Burton. The next day, he was re-signed to the practice squad. He was promoted to the active roster on September 11. Burton finished the 2024 season with 7 rushing attempts for 8 yards and a touchdown and 10 receptions for 65 yards and a touchdown and 6 tackles on special teams.

On March 26, 2025, Burton and the Broncos agreed to another one-year extension. On August 26, Burton was placed on season-ending injured reserve after suffering a hamstring injury prior to the preseason.

=== Cleveland Browns ===
On April 27, 2026, Burton signed a one-year contract with the Cleveland Browns.

== Personal life ==
Burton is a Christian. He is married to his high school sweetheart Kirsten Burton. They have two daughters and a son.
