= Martin Mayhew =

American football player and executive (born 1965)

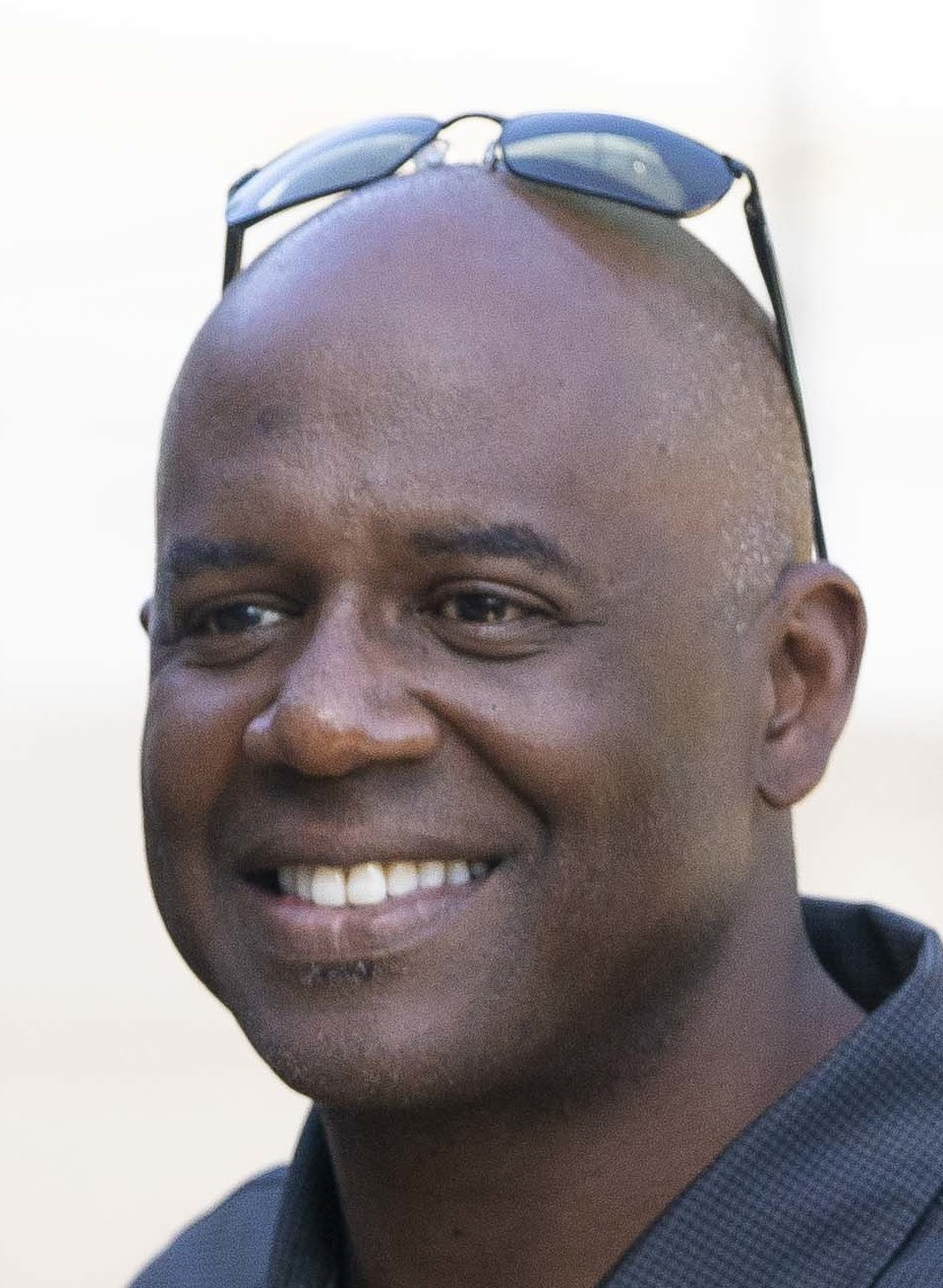
- Mayhew in 2021

No. 35
- Position: Cornerback

Personal information
- Born: October 8, 1965 (age 61); Daytona Beach, Florida, U.S.
- Listed height: 5 ft 8 in (1.73 m)
- Listed weight: 172 lb (78 kg)

Career information
- High school: Florida (Tallahassee, Florida)
- College: Florida State (1983–1987)
- NFL draft: 1988: 10th round, 262nd overall pick

Career history

Playing
- Buffalo Bills (1988); Washington Redskins (1989–1992); Tampa Bay Buccaneers (1993–1996)

Operations
- Washington Redskins (1999) Personnel intern; NFL (2000) Labor operations and legal intern; XFL (2000–2001) Director of football administration; Detroit Lions (2001–2003) Senior director of football administration; Detroit Lions (2004–2008) Senior vice president and assistant general manager; Detroit Lions (2008–2015) General manager; New York Giants (2016) Director of football operations; San Francisco 49ers (2017–2018) Senior personnel executive; San Francisco 49ers (2019–2020) Vice president of player personnel; Washington Football Team / Commanders (2021–2023) General manager; Washington Commanders (2024) Senior personnel executive/advisor to the GM

Awards and highlights
- Super Bowl champion (XXVI); Second-team All-South Independent (1985)

Career NFL statistics
- Games played: 118
- Tackles: 618
- Interceptions: 21
- Forced fumbles: 5
- Touchdowns: 2
- Stats at Pro Football Reference
- Executive profile at Pro Football Reference

Martin R. Mayhew (born October 8, 1965) is an American former professional football executive and cornerback of the National Football League (NFL). He played college football for the Florida State Seminoles prior to being selected by the Buffalo Bills in the 10th round of the 1988 NFL draft. Mayhew sat out his rookie season due to a wrist injury and joined the Washington Redskins a year later, with whom he won Super Bowl XXVI with, and later played for the Tampa Bay Buccaneers before retiring following the 1996 season.

Following his playing career, Mayhew graduated with a Juris Doctor degree from the Georgetown University Law Center in 2000. He worked as an administrator for the XFL the same year before joining the Detroit Lions in 2001, where he worked as an assistant executive prior to being promoted to general manager (GM) in 2008. He remained in that role until 2015, later serving senior executive roles with the New York Giants, San Francisco 49ers, and Washington Commanders before retiring in 2025.

== Early life and college ==
Mayhew was born on October 8, 1965, in Daytona Beach, Florida. He attended Florida High School prior to enrolling a year early at Florida State University in 1983, where he played 33 career games at cornerback for the Florida State Seminoles football team opposite future Pro Football Hall of Famer Deion Sanders. He was also a member of their track and field team. He was named an Academic All-America in 1985 and was also included on the All-South Independent second-team. He graduated with a Bachelor of Science degree in business management in 1987.

== Professional career ==
=== Player ===
Pre-draft measurables
Height	Weight	Hand span	40-yard dash	10-yard split	20-yard split	20-yard shuttle	Vertical jump	Broad jump	Bench press
5 ft 8 1/2 in (1.74 m)	172 lb (78 kg)	8 1/2 in (0.22 m)	4.47 s	1.60 s	2.63 s	4.42 s	34 in (0.86 m)	9 ft 3 in (2.82 m)	7 reps
All values from the 1988 NFL Combine

Mayhew was drafted by the Buffalo Bills in the tenth round (262nd overall) of the 1988 NFL draft. He suffered a wrist injury during his rookie year and was placed on injured reserve before he could make any game appearances with them. He left in free agency the following year and signed with the Washington Redskins, where he started for them over the next four seasons including in their Super Bowl XXVI win at the end of the 1991 season.

In 1993, he signed a four-year $5.5 million contract with the Tampa Bay Buccaneers. He was offered a new contract by them during the 1997 offseason but declined it and subsequently retired, citing the lack of competitive compensation, the recent birth of his child, and his desire to finish his law degree that he started while living in Washington. He finished his career playing in 118 games with 473 tackles, 21 interceptions, 4 forced fumbles, and a sack.

=== Executive ===
Mayhew interned for nine months within the Redskins' personnel department in 1999, where he assisted in scouting players for the team leading up to the 2000 NFL draft. The following year, he worked as a labor operations and legal intern for the NFL league office, and was also the director of football administration for the XFL until it folded after its lone season in 2001. That same year, Mayhew was hired by the Detroit Lions as their senior director of football administration by Matt Millen before being promoted to assistant general manager in October 2004. He became the team's general manager upon the firing of Millen in September 2008 and retained that role for eight seasons until being fired following a 1–7 start to the 2015 season.

Mayhew spent the 2016 season with the New York Giants as their director of football operations before joining the San Francisco 49ers as a senior personnel executive the following year. He was promoted to their vice president of player personnel in 2019. Mayhew was hired as general manager of the Washington Commanders in January 2021. He served in an advisory role to head coach Ron Rivera, who had final say in football matters. In January 2024, he was replaced at general manager by Adam Peters but remained with the team as a senior personnel executive and advisor. The Commanders announced his retirement as an executive on February 25, 2025.

== Personal life ==
Following his time at Florida State, Mayhew briefly worked at a First Union bank in Charlotte. He attended night classes at Georgetown University Law Center during his time with the Redskins in the early 1990s but had to drop out when he left for the Buccaneers in 1993. He re-enrolled there following his retirement as a player in 1997 and graduated with a Juris Doctor degree in 2000. Mayhew is a member of The Florida Bar and has also served as a board member of the Henry Ford Museum and Detroit Police Athletic League (PAL).
