= Boldewijn =

Boldewijn is a surname. Notable people with the surname include:

- Enzio Boldewijn (born 1992), Dutch footballer
- Geraldo Boldewijn (born 1991), American football player
- Lucien Boldewijn (born 1971), Dutch basketball player

== See also ==
- Boudewijn (given name)
