= 2011 Boise State Broncos football team =

American college football season

2011 Boise State Broncos football

Macco Bowl Las Vegas champion

Maaco Bowl Las Vegas, W 56–24 vs. Arizona State
- Conference: Mountain West Conference

Ranking
- Coaches: No. 6
- AP: No. 8
- Record: 12–1 (6–1 MW)
- Head coach: Chris Petersen (6th season)
- Offensive coordinator: Brent Pease (1st season)
- Offensive scheme: Multiple
- Defensive coordinator: Pete Kwiatkowski (2nd season)
- Base defense: 4–2–5
- Home stadium: Bronco Stadium

2011 Mountain West Conference football standings
	Conf.			Overall
Team	W		L	W		L
No. 14 TCU $	7	–	0	11	–	2
No. 8 Boise State	6	–	1	12	–	1
Wyoming	5	–	2	8	–	5
San Diego State	4	–	3	8	–	5
Air Force	3	–	4	7	–	6
Colorado State	1	–	6	3	–	9
UNLV	1	–	6	2	–	10
New Mexico	1	–	6	1	–	11
$ – Conference champion; Rankings from AP Poll

The 2011 Boise State Broncos football team represented Boise State University in the 2011 NCAA Division I FBS football season. The Broncos were led by head coach Chris Petersen, winner of the 2010 Bobby Dodd Coach of the Year Award, and played their home games at Bronco Stadium. This season was Boise State's first in the Mountain West Conference after spending the previous ten years in the Western Athletic Conference. They finished the season 12–1, 6–1 Mountain West play to finish in second place. They were invited the Maaco Bowl Las Vegas for the second consecutive year where they defeated Arizona State 56–24.

Between 2008 and 2011, the Broncos went 50–3 to become the first team in FBS history to win 50 games in four years. With the 50–3 record, quarterback Kellen Moore set a new record for the most wins by a starting quarterback in FBS history, passing former Texas quarterback Colt McCoy (45 wins).

== Preseason ==
=== Award watch lists ===
Listed in the order that they were released.

Maxwell Award – Sr. QB Kellen Moore, Sr. RB Doug Martin.

Chuck Bednarik Award – Sr. DT Billy Winn.

John Mackey Award – Sr. TE Kyle Efaw.

Fred Biletnikoff Award – Sr. WR Tyler Shoemaker.

Bronko Nagurski Trophy – Sr. DT Billy Winn.

Outland Trophy – Sr. DT Billy Winn, Sr. OT Nate Potter.

Jim Thorpe Award – Sr. S George Iloka

Lombardi Award – Sr. C Thomas Byrd, Sr. DE Shae McClellin, Sr. OT Nate Potter, Sr. DT Billy Winn.

Rimington Trophy – Sr. C Thomas Byrd.

Davey O'Brien Award – Sr. QB Kellen Moore.

Doak Walker Award – Sr. RB Doug Martin.

Walter Camp Award – Sr. QB Kellen Moore.

Ted Hendricks Award – Sr. DE Shea McClellin.

Manning Award – Sr. QB Kellen Moore.

Kellen Moore also won the Anson Mount Scholar/Athlete award on the Playboy Preseason All-America Team. Playboy also ranked Boise State #2 to start the season.

=== Mountain West media days ===
During the Mountain West media days held on July 26–27 at the Red Rock Resort in Las Vegas, Boise State was picked as the overwhelming favorite to win the conference, garnering 28 of 31 first place votes. Sr. QB Kellen Moore was selected as the preseason offensive player of the year and thus was the QB on the preseason All–Conference team. Joining him on the All–Conference team were Sr. RB Doug Martin, Sr. OL Thomas Bryd, Sr. OL Nate Potter, Sr. DL Billy Winn, Sr. DL Shea McClellin, and Sr. S George Iloka.

==== Media poll ====
1. Boise State – 236 (28)
2. TCU – 208 (3)
3. Air Force – 176
4. San Diego State – 160
5. Colorado State – 104
6. Wyoming – 80
7. UNLV – 77
8. New Mexico – 39

==== All-blue uniform ban ====
Boise State was banned by the Mountain West Conference from wearing their traditional all-blue uniforms during conference home games. MW commissioner Craig Thompson's reason for the rule was that coaches had stated that the Broncos received a "competitive advantage" when wearing all blue on the blue turf of Bronco Stadium. Boise State head coach Chris Petersen was quoted that he thought the ban was "ridiculous".

=== Preseason polls ===
On August 3, Boise State was ranked #7 in the preseason USA Today Coaches' Poll, receiving 1,065 points. Their season opening opponent, Georgia, started the year ranked #22 making this the third straight season Boise State opened the year against a ranked team from a BCS conference. Boise State won the previous two (Oregon and Virginia Tech).

On August 20, Boise State was ranked #5 in the preseason AP Poll, receiving 1,200 points including 2 first place votes.

== Schedule ==
Date	Time	Opponent	Rank	Site	TV	Result	Attendance
September 3	6:00 p.m.	vs. No. 19 Georgia*	No. 5	Georgia Dome; Atlanta, GA (Chick-fil-A Kickoff Game)	ESPN	W 35–21	73,614
September 16	6:00 p.m.	at Toledo*	No. 4	Glass Bowl; Toledo, OH	ESPN	W 40–15	28,905
September 24	6:00 p.m.	Tulsa*	No. 4	Bronco Stadium; Boise, ID	CBSSN	W 41–21	34,019
October 1	12:30 p.m.	Nevada*	No. 4	Bronco Stadium; Boise, ID (rivalry)	Versus	W 30–10	34,098
October 7	7:00 p.m.	at Fresno State*	No. 5	Bulldog Stadium; Fresno, CA (Battle for the Milk Can)	ESPN	W 57–7	33,871
October 15	4:00 p.m.	at Colorado State	No. 5	Sonny Lubick Field at Hughes Stadium; Fort Collins, CO	The Mtn.	W 63–13	30,027
October 22	1:30 p.m.	Air Force^{†}	No. 5	Bronco Stadium; Boise, ID	Versus	W 37–26	34,196^{A}
November 5	8:30 p.m.	at UNLV	No. 5	Sam Boyd Stadium; Whitney, NV	CBSSN	W 48–21	26,281
November 12	1:30 p.m.	TCU	No. 5	Bronco Stadium; Boise, ID	Versus	L 35–36	34,146
November 19	6:00 p.m.	at San Diego State	No. 10	Qualcomm Stadium; San Diego, CA	CBSSN	W 52–35	52,256
November 26	12:00 p.m.	Wyoming	No. 7	Bronco Stadium; Boise, ID	The Mtn.	W 36–14	33,773
December 3	4:00 p.m.	New Mexico	No. 9	Bronco Stadium; Boise, ID	The Mtn.	W 45–0	33,878
December 22	6:00 p.m.	vs. Arizona State*	No. 8	Sam Boyd Stadium; Whitney, NV (Maaco Bowl Las Vegas)	ESPN	W 56–24	35,720
*Non-conference game; ^{†}Homecoming; Rankings from AP Poll released prior to the game; All times are in Mountain time

- ^ADenotes the then largest crowd in Bronco Stadium history. Previous high was 34,137 vs Oregon State in 2010. The record was beaten on September 20, 2012 vs BYU with 36,864.

Boise State was set to play Utah in Boise in 2011, with games in 2012 and 2013 also scheduled. However, due to their move to the Pac-12, where they will play nine conference games, and their desire to continue their rivalry with former conference member and newly independent BYU, Utah bought their way out of the series. Boise State replaced Utah with Fresno State and Nevada as both schools were also looking for another game due to having one less conference game due to Boise State's departure from the WAC. Fresno State and Nevada will become conference games again in 2012 as they will join the Mountain West.

Locations for Mountain West Conference games were announced on November 4, 2010.

Boise State was scheduled to open the 2011 season at Mississippi, however, on November 20, 2010 they announced they would open the season against Georgia in the 2011 Chick-fil-A Kickoff Game in Atlanta. Their meeting with Mississippi will be pushed back to 2014 also in the Chick-fil-A Kickoff Game.

On January 25, Boise State's conference game with TCU, which was originally scheduled to be played in Fort Worth, was moved to Boise. The move was due in part to TCU announcing they would be leaving for the Big East Conference in 2012 (they ultimately went to the Big 12 instead). To accommodate the change, the Broncos played San Diego State in San Diego instead of Boise.

The Mountain West released dates for conference games on March 3, 2011.

On March 21, as part of the WAC's TV contract with ESPN, it was announced that the game at Fresno State would be moved to Friday, October 7 to be broadcast on ESPN. This was the 11th straight year the Battle for the Milk Can that was broadcast on the ESPN family of networks.

On April 7, the Mountain West announced times and TV for all conference and home MW games.

For the first time in 40 years, Boise State did not play their in-state rival Idaho and currently have no future matchups scheduled.

== Game summaries ==
=== Vs. Georgia–Chick-fil-A Kickoff Game ===
Team	1	2	3	4	Total
• No. 7 Broncos	7	7	14	7	35
No. 22 Bulldogs	7	0	7	7	21

- Date: September 3
- Location: Georgia Dome, Atlanta, GA

Scoring summary
1	8:39	UGA	Brandon Boykin 80-yard run (Blair Walsh kick)	UGA 7–0
1	3:02	BSU	Matt Miller 17-yard pass from Kellen Moore (Dan Goodale kick)	Tied 7–7
2	0:48	BSU	Kyle Efaw 12-yard pass from Kellen Moore (Dan Goodale kick)	BSU 14–7
3	11:01	BSU	Doug Martin 7-yard run (Dan Goodale kick)	BSU 21–7
3	3:10	BSU	Tyler Shoemaker 3-yard pass from Kellen Moore (Dan Goodale kick)	BSU 28–7
3	1:19	UGA	Orson Charles 36-yard pass from Aaron Murray (Blair Walsh kick)	BSU 28–14
4	11:37	BSU	D.J. Harper 1-yard run (Dan Goodale kick)	BSU 35–14
4	10:15	UGA	Malcolm Mitchell 51-yard pass from Aaron Murray (Blair Walsh kick)	BSU 35–21

Uniform Combination
Helmet	Jersey	Pants

Boise State opened the season with a win against a top 20 (AP poll) team from a BCS conference for the third straight year with their 35–21 win in the fourth annual Chick-fil-A Kickoff Game. Georgia got on the board first with an 80-yard touchdown run by Brandon Boykin, which was his first career offensive play. Boise State tie the game up later in the first quarter when Kellen Moore found freshman wide receiver Matt Miller for a 17-yard touchdown. The TD pass was Moore's 100th career touchdown pass. 48 seconds before halftime, Boise State would take the lead when Moore connected on his second touchdown pass, this time from 12 yards out to tight end Kyle Efaw to give the Broncos a 14–7 halftime lead. Boise State increased their lead in the third quarter with a 7-yard touchdown run by Doug Martin and Moore's third touchdown pass of 3 yards to Tyler Shoemaker for a 28–7 lead. After Boise State was penalized for being offsides on a fourth and seven during a punt, Georgia went for it on fourth and two and scored on a 36-yard touchdown to Orson Charles from Aaron Murray to cut into the lead at the end of the third quarter. The Broncos drove the ball 76 yards on their last scoring drive, capped off by a 1-yard D.J. Harper touchdown run. Another long Georgia touchdown from 51 yards out brought the scoring to an end and the Broncos would leave Atlanta with their first ever win against a team from the SEC (previously 0–4). Kellen Moore is now 5–0 in his career against BCS teams. The Bronco defense finished with six sacks, 2.5 by Shea McClellin, and one interception by Jerrell Gavins.

Passing Leaders	Rushing Leaders	Receiving Leaders	Total Yards
Kellen Moore: 28/34, 261 YDS, 3 TDS, 1 INT	Doug Martin: 24 CAR, 57 YDS, 1 TD, LG of 9	Tyler Shoemaker: 5 REC, 57 YDS, 1 TD, LG of 17	BSU: 390
	D.J. Harper: 8 CAR, 44 YDS, 1 TD, LG of 17	Kyle Efaw: 6 REC, 53 YDS, 1 TD, LG of 18	UGA: 373

On September 5, Kellen Moore was named the Mountain West offensive player of the week, becoming the first Bronco to win the award in their first game as a conference member. This was the second straight year Moore won a player of the week award after the season opening game. The Broncos moved up one spot in the AP poll to #4 with 2 first place votes and moved up 2 spots in the coaches poll to #5. Following their bye week, they moved up to #4 in the coaches.

=== At Toledo ===
	1	2	3	4	Total
No. 4 Broncos	13	7	7	13	40
Rockets	6	3	0	6	15

2nd meeting. 1–0 all time. Last meeting 2010, 57–14 Broncos win in Boise.

Uniform Combination
Helmet	Jersey	Pants

Kellen Moore completed a career-high 32 passes to nine different receivers for 455 yards and five touchdowns as the Broncos rolled to a 40–15 win over preseason MAC favorite Toledo. After forcing the Broncos to punt on their first possession, Toledo took and early lead on a 24-yard touchdown pass to go up 6–0 (pat failed). The Broncos would answer on Moore's first TD pass of the night from 26 yards out to Tyler Shoemaker. His second TD pass of the night came on the Broncos next possession when Doug Martin took a screen pass 71 yards for a 13–6 Bronco lead at the end of the first quarter. After trading punts throughout the second quarter, the Broncos would put together a 7-play, 64-yard drive in only 1:05, capped off with a 1-yard TD pass from Moore to Shoemaker, to score with 17 seconds before halftime. A kickoff out of bounds gave the Rockets great field possession and managed a 35-yard field goal and cut the Bronco lead to 20–9 at the half. In the third quarter, Toledo looked like they were going to keep the game close as they drove to the Bronco's 11-yard line. However, Shae McClellin tipped a Rocket pass that was intercepted by Chase Baker to end the Toledo hopes. The Broncos followed by marching 88 yards, capped off with Moore's fourth TD pass to Kyle Efaw, to take a 27–9 lead. Toledo's last chance to get back into the game came when Moore was intercepted and the Rockets drove to the six-yard line. However, the Broncos forced a fumble that was recovered by J.C. Percy. Moore would add another TD pass to Shoemaker for 17 yards later in the 4th to put the Broncos up 33–9. Toledo would score quick to make it 33–15 but the Broncos would milk the clock with their second string and add a final touchdown by Drew Wright for a final score of 40–15.

Passing Leaders	Rushing Leaders	Receiving Leaders	Total Yards
Kellen Moore: 32/42, 455 YDS, 5 TDS, 1 INT	Doug Martin: 19 CAR, 70 YDS, LG of 12	Tyler Shoemaker: 4 REC, 52 YDS, 3 TDS, LG of 26	BSU: 610
Joe Southwick: 1/1, 10 YDS	Drew Wright: 5 CAR, 29 YDS, 1 TD, LG of 8	Doug Martin: 5 REC, 122 YDS, 1 TD, LG of 71	TOL: 349
		Mitch Burroughs: 6 REC, 76 YDS, LG of 27	

1st Quarter

- 11:35 TOL–Danny Noble 24 Yd Pass From Austin Dantin (Pat Failed) 0–6
- 06:56 BSU–Tyler Shoemaker 26 Yd Pass From Kellen Moore (Dan Goodale Kick) 7–6
- 02:45 BSU–Doug Martin 71 Yd Pass From Kellen Moore (Pat Failed) 13–6

2nd Quarter

- 00:17 BSU–Tyler Shoemaker 1 Yd Pass From Kellen Moore (Michael Frisina Kick) 20–6
- 00:00 TOL–Ryan Casano 35 Yd FG 20–9

3rd Quarter

- 06:30 BSU–Kyle Efaw 12 Yd Pass From Kellen Moore (Michael Frisina Kick) 27–9

4th Quarter

- 05:58 BSU–Tyler Shoemaker 17 Yd Pass From Kellen Moore (Pat Failed) 33–9
- 04:33 TOL–Adonis Thomas 1 Yd Run (Pat Failed) 33–15
- 01:30 BSU–Drew Wright 8 Yd Run (Michael Frisina Kick) 40–15

On September 19, Kellen Moore was named the Mountain West Offensive player of the week for the second time, this week shared with San Diego State running back Ronnie Hillman. Moore was also named the Davey O'Brien Quarterback of the Week. The Broncos remained at #4 in both polls and did retain their two first place votes in the AP poll.

=== Tulsa ===
	1	2	3	4	Total
Golden Hurricane	0	0	7	14	21
No. 4 Broncos	13	14	7	7	41

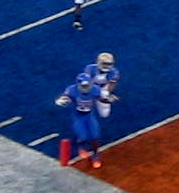
Doug Martin's 2nd-quarter TD.

Uniform Combination
Helmet	Jersey	Pants

Boise State dominated Tulsa en route to their 350th regular season win in school history. After stalling inside the 5-yard line on the first drive of the game, the Broncos would control the rest of the first half with three Kellen Moore touchdown passes, two to Tyler Shoemaker, and a 33-yard Doug Martin touchdown run to give the Broncos a 27–0 lead at halftime. Kellen Moore would only play one series in the second half, but it was long enough to add a fourth touchdown pass, this time to Mitch Burroughs. The Tulsa offense was able to drive the field on the Bronco defense pretty consistently in the second half, scoring three touchdowns. But backup quarterback Joe Southwick was able to keep the Broncos lead out of reach with a touchdown pass to Gabe Linehan, the Broncos fifth touchdown threw the air on the night. The Bronco defense recorded four interceptions of Tulsa quarterback G.J. Kinnie, two by Jerrell Gavins.

Passing Leaders	Rushing Leaders	Receiving Leaders	Total Yards
Kellen Moore: 23/29, 279 YDS, 4 TDS	Doug Martin: 21 CAR, 75 YDS, 1 TD, LG of 33	Tyler Shoemaker: 5 REC, 102 YDS, 2 TDS, LG of 31	BSU: 458
Joe Southwick: 5/7, 47 YDS, 1 TD	D.J. Harper: 15 CAR, 43 YDS, LG of 7	Mitch Burroughs: 5 REC, 63 YDS, 1 TD, LG of 27	TLSA: 291
		Matt Miller: 4 REC, 57 YDS, LG of 38	

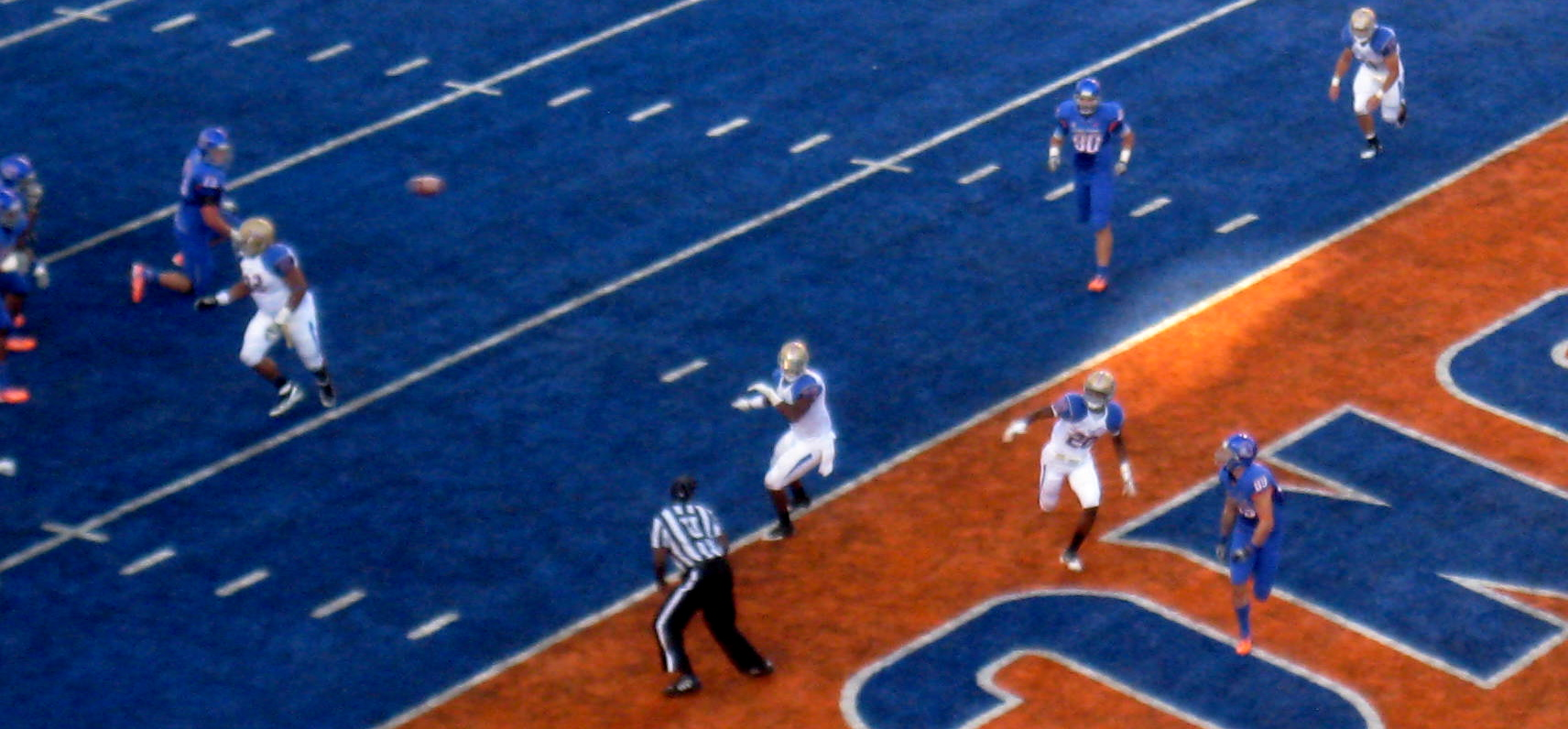
Tyler Shoemaker about to catch his first touchdown.

1st Quarter

- 06:34 BSU–Tyler Shoemaker 26 Yd Pass From Kellen Moore (Pat Blocked) 0–6
- 01:44 BSU–Tyler Shoemaker 6 Yd Pass From Kellen Moore (Dan Goodale Kick) 0–13

2nd Quarter

- 14:25 BSU–Doug Martin 33 Yd Run (Dan Goodale Kick) 0–20
- 02:12 BSU–Kyle Efaw 1 Yd Pass From Kellen Moore (Dan Goodale Kick) 0–27

3rd Quarter

- 09:25 BSU–Mitch Burroughs 10 Yd Pass From Kellen Moore (Dan Goodale Kick) 0–34
- 04:11 TLSA–Trey Watts 3 Yd Run (Kevin Fitzpatrick Kick) 7–34

4th Quarter

- 14:55 TLSA–Willie Carter 8 Yd Pass From G.J. Kinne (Kevin Fitzpatrick Kick) 14–34
- 06:27 BSU–Gabe Linehan 5 Yd Pass From Joe Southwick (Dan Goodale Kick) 14–41
- 03:19 TLSA–Ricky Johnson 13 Yd Pass From Kalen Henderson (Kevin Fitzpatrick Kick) 21–41

Despite winning and #5 Stanford not playing this week, the Broncos would be jumped by the Cardinal and are now ranked #5 in the coaches poll. The Broncos remained at #4 in the AP poll but did lose a first place vote to now only have one.

=== Nevada ===
	1	2	3	4	Total
Wolf Pack	0	0	0	10	10
No. 5 Broncos	7	13	10	0	30

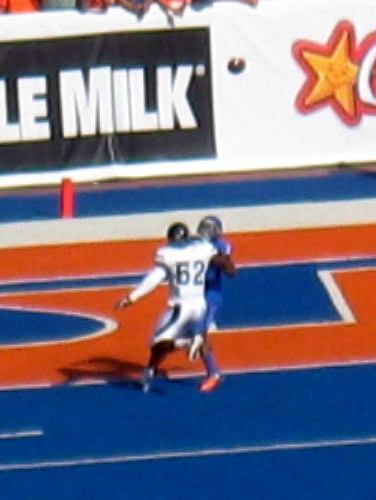
D.J. Harper about to catch a 1st-quarter TD.

Uniform Combination
Helmet	Jersey	Pants

Boise State avenged their only loss from the 2010 season in dominating fashion with a 30–10 win over their rival Nevada. Kellen Moore had one of his worst days of his career statistically with only 142 yards and two interceptions, but he also managed two touchdowns on 19 completions. Doug Martin did the rest of the damage running the ball 21 times for 126 yards and two touchdowns. His second touchdown was a 43 yarder at the beginning of the 3rd quarter to put the Broncos up 27–0. The Bronco defense completely shut down the powerful pistol attack of the Wolf Pack, holding Nevada to only 59 yards rushing. 53 of Nevada's 182 total yards came on a late touchdown with less than one minute to play. Boise State attempted and made their first field goal of the season, a 31 yarder from freshman Dan Goodale.

Passing Leaders	Rushing Leaders	Receiving Leaders	Total Yards
Kellen Moore: 19/33, 142 YDS, 2 TDS, 2 INTS	Doug Martin: 21 CAR, 126 YDS, 2 TDS, LG of 43	Mitch Burroughs: 5 REC, 34 YDS LG of 11	BSU: 329
Joe Southwick: 2/2, 18 YDS	D.J. Harper: 11 CAR, 36 YDS, LG of 16	Tyler Shoemaker: 2 REC, 25 YDS LG of 25	NEV: 182
		Matt Miller: 4 REC, 24 YDS, 1 TD, LG of 8	

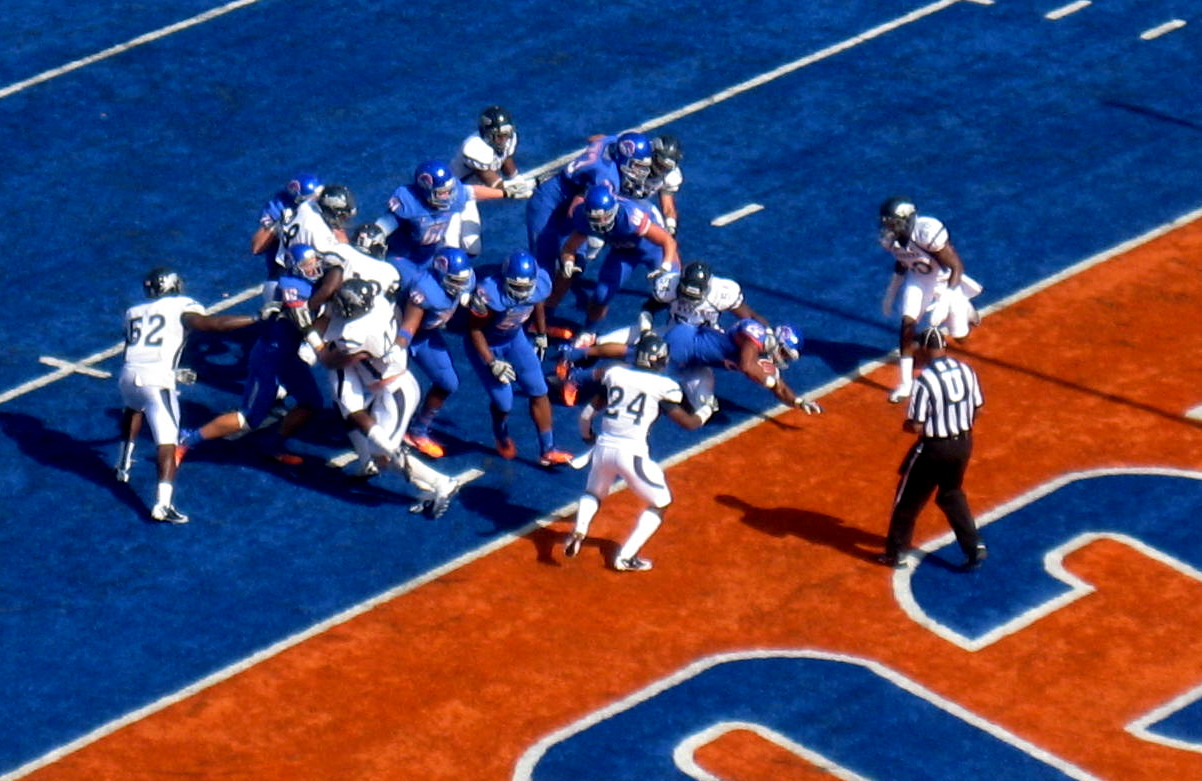
Doug Martin diving for a 5-yard TD in the 2nd quarter.

1st Quarter

- 07:37 BSU–D.J. Harper 21 Yd Pass From Kellen Moore (Dan Goodale Kick) 0–7

2nd Quarter

- 05:51 BSU–Matt Miller 3 Yd Pass From Kellen Moore (Dan Goodale Kick) 0–14
- 01:24 BSU–Doug Martin 5 Yd Run (Two-Point Run Conversion Failed) 0–20

3rd Quarter

- 12:56 BSU–Doug Martin 43 Yd Run (Dan Goodale Kick) 0–27
- 08:23 BSU–Dan Goodale 31 Yd FG 0–30

4th Quarter

- 14:48 NEV–Allen Hardison 21 Yd FG 3–30
- 00:46 NEV–Rishard Matthews 53 Yd Pass From Mason Magleby (Allen Hardison Kick) 10–30

For the second consecutive week, despite winning, the Broncos would fall in the rankings, this time in both polls. They fell one spot in both polls to now be ranked #6 in the coaches poll and #5 in the AP poll. They did still receive one first place vote in the AP poll.

=== At Fresno State–Battle for the Milk Can ===
	1	2	3	4	Total
No. 6 Broncos	16	21	13	7	57
Bulldogs	0	0	0	7	7

Uniform Combination
Helmet	Jersey	Pants

Boise State scored over 50 points against their rivals Fresno State for the fourth straight game en route to retaining the Milk Can for the sixth straight year with a 57–7 win. Kellen Moore threw 3 first half touchdowns, one to Matt Miller and two to Geraldo Boldewijn who was returning from a 4-game suspension for receiving impermissible benefits. Rushing touchdowns by Mitch Burroughs and D.J. Harper and a 32-yard Dan Goodale field goal gave the Broncos a lead of 37–0 at halftime. Boise State added three more rushing touchdowns in the second half by Harper, Doug Martin, and Grant Hedrick (first career TD) and gave up a punt return touchdown for Fresno State's only score. The Bronco defense forced four turnovers, including interceptions by Jamar Taylor and Jonathan Brown. Hunter White also blocked a punt.

Passing Leaders	Rushing Leaders	Receiving Leaders	Total Yards
Kellen Moore: 23/31, 254 YDS, 3 TDS	Doug Martin: 16 CAR, 94 YDS, 1 TD, LG of 55	Matt Miller: 5 REC, 78 YDS, 1 TD, LG of 48	BSU: 464
Joe Southwick: 3/5, 27 YDS	Grant Hedrick: 3 CAR, 38 YDS, 1 TD, LG of 23	Gerraldo Boldewijn: 3 REC, 33 YDS, 2 TD, LG of 18	FRES: 270
	D.J. Harper: 6 CAR, 17 YDS, 2 TDS, LG of 6	Gabe Linehan: 3 REC, 48 YDS, LG of 28	

1st Quarter

- 10:29 BSU–Matt Miller 4 Yd Pass From Kellen Moore (Dan Goodale Kick) 7–0
- 01:59 BSU–Dan Goodale 32 Yd FG 10–0
- 00:54 BSU–Mitch Burroughs 25 Yd Run (Pat Failed) 13–0

2nd Quarter

- 09:52 BSU–Geraldo Boldewijn 18 Yd Pass From Kellen Moore (Dan Goodale Kick) 23–0
- 06:28 BSU–D.J. Harper 6 Yd Run (Dan Goodale Kick) 30–0
- 00:20 BSU–Geraldo Boldewijn 4 Yd Pass From Kellen Moore (Dan Goodale Kick) 37–0

3rd Quarter

- 08:59 BSU–Doug Martin 1 Yd Run (Pat Blocked) 43–0
- 04:06 BSU–D.J. Harper 3 Yd Run (Dan Goodale Kick) 50–0

4th Quarter

- 14:44 FRES–Devon Wylie 79 Yd Punt Return (Kevin Goessling Kick) 50–7
- 00:17 BSU–Grant Hedrick 23 Yd Run (Dan Goodale Kick) 57–7

Boise State remained the same in both the AP and Coaches poll, #5 and #6 respectively, and debuted at #5 in the Harris Interactive poll with one first place vote. On October 10, Kellen Moore was named the Mountain West Offensive Player of the Week for the third time this season.

=== At Colorado State ===
	1	2	3	4	Total
No. 6 Broncos	21	14	28	0	63
Rams	0	13	0	0	13

Uniform Combination
Helmet	Jersey	Pants

In their first conference game as a member of the Mountain West, Boise State took no time announcing their presence by setting a school record for total yards in a blowout win over Colorado State. Doug Martin would start the scoring for the Broncos with rushing touchdowns from 26 and 65 yards. Kellen Moore kept the long touchdowns coming with a 52-yard TD pass to Tyler Shoemaker for a 21–0 lead at the end of the 1st quarter. D.J. Harper scored on a 36-yard run and Kellen Moore found his brother Kirby from 9 yards out to extend the lead to 35–0. Colorado State went to their bag of tricks and scored on two touchdown passes by a wide receiver and a running back to cut into the lead 35–13 at the half. The Rams looked to seize momentum by holding the Broncos to a 3-and-out on their first possession. However, the Broncos would fake the punt with a 37-yard run by Tyler Shoemaker and score on Doug Martin's 3rd TD run from 14 yards just three plays later. Boise State would add three more 3rd-quarter touchdowns with 2 Kellen Moore TD passes, including one to Shoemaker of 62 yards, and a D.J. Harpter TD run. Boise State set a school record with 742 total yards and outgained the Rams by 511 yards. The Bronco defense recorded seven tackles for loss with three sacks, two by Tyrone Crawford who also recovered a fumble. Shae McClellin had an interception.

Passing Leaders	Rushing Leaders	Receiving Leaders	Total Yards
Kellen Moore: 26/30, 338 YDS, 4 TDS	Doug Martin: 20 CAR, 200 YDS, 3 TDS, LG of 65	Tyler Shoemaker: 9 REC, 180 YDS, 2 TDS, LG of 62	BSU: 742
Joe Southwick: 1/1, 11 YDS	D.J. Harper: 8 CAR, 63 YDS, 2 TDS, LG of 36	Mitch Burroughs: 5 REC, 64 YDS, LG of 25	CSU: 231
	Drew Wright: 16 CAR, 79 YDS, LG of 11	Kirby Moore: 2 REC, 20 YDS, 1 TD, LG of 11	

1st Quarter

- 09:23 BSU–Doug Martin 26 Yd Run (Dan Goodale Kick) 7–0
- 07:55 BSU–Doug Martin 65 Yd Run (Dan Goodale Kick) 14–0
- 00:59 BSU–Tyler Shoemaker 52 Yd Pass From Kellen Moore (Dan Goodale Kick) 21–0

2nd Quarter

- 12:46 BSU–D.J. Harper 36 Yd Run (Dan Goodale Kick) 28–0
- 10:01 BSU–Kirby Moore 9 Yd Pass From Kellen Moore (Dan Goodale Kick) 35–0
- 09:17 CSU–Joe Brown 27 Yd Pass From Crockett Gillmore (Pat Blocked) 35–6
- 04:01 CSU–Matt Yemm 20 Yd Pass From Charles Lovett (Ben Deline Kick) 35–13

3rd Quarter

- 11:26 BSU–Doug Martin 14 Yd Run (Dan Goodale Kick) 42–13
- 08:47 BSU–Tyler Shoemaker 62 Yd Pass From Kellen Moore (Dan Goodale Kick) 49–13
- 07:03 BSU–Gabe Linehan 3 Yd Pass From Kellen Moore (Dan Goodale Kick) 56–13
- 04:41 BSU–D.J. Harper 1 Yd Run (Dan Goodale Kick) 63–13

The Broncos remained the same in the AP and Harris polls, including still receiving one first place vote, and despite gaining two total points they would fall to #7 in the Coaches poll. Boise State debuted at #5 in the first BCS standings of the season. Doug Martin and Tyrone Crawford were named the Mountain West offensive and defensive players of the week. Martin's award was shared with San Diego State running back Ronnie Hillman.

=== Air Force ===
	1	2	3	4	Total
Falcons	0	10	3	13	26
No. 7 Broncos	7	13	7	10	37

Uniform Combination
Helmet	Jersey	Pants

Boise State's first ever meeting with a service academy had a record attendance crowd of 34,196 on the edge of their seats as the Broncos were able to hold on to beat the Falcons 37–26 for Boise State's first ever home win in Mountain West play. Boise State got on the board early with a 24-yard touchdown pass from Kellen Moore to Tyler Shoemaker. Air Force's triple option attack answered midway through the second quarter with a 1-yard touchdown run for a 7–7 tie. Three minutes later Kellen Moore found Matt Miller for a 19-yard touchdown and a 13–7 lead. The Broncos next score came on a fake punt attempt by Air Force. The Broncos were able to strip the ball during the fake punt and Hunter White returned the fumble for a 16-yard touchdown and a 20–7 lead. Air Force drove the field quick to add a field goal for a halftime score of 20–10. Air Force opened the second half with another field goal before Doug Martin broke a 15-yard touchdown to put the Broncos up 27–13 at the end of the third quarter. Air Force's next drive would span 80 yards on 18 plays, including a rushing first down on 3rd and 21, culminating in a 3-yard touchdown run and a score of 27–20. The Broncos followed with their own 10 play, 68-yard drive ending with Moore's third touchdown pass, this time a 2 yarder to Doug Martin and a 34–20 Bronco lead. Air Force would not go away and would score in just 5 plays, including a 51-yard pass, for a score of 34–26 after a blocked extra point. Boise State would finally put the game out of reach by eating up most of the clock on their way to a 25-yard Dan Goodale field goal for the 37–26 Bronco win. The Bronco defense gave up 264 yards rushing and linebacker Byron Hout finished with 18 tackles.

Passing Leaders	Rushing Leaders	Receiving Leaders	Total Yards
Kellen Moore: 23/29, 281 YDS, 3 TDS, 1 INT	Doug Martin: 21 CAR, 125 YDS, 1 TD, LG of 15	Tyler Shoemaker: 4 REC, 98 YDS, 1 TD, LG of 32	BSU: 423
	D.J. Harper: 4 CAR, 18 YDS, LG of 7	Matt Miller: 5 REC, 67 YDS, 1 TD, LG of 24	AFA: 408
		Geraldo Boldewijn: 3 REC, 39 YDS, LG of 16	

1st Quarter

- 11:36 BSU–Tyler Shoemaker 24 Yd Pass From Kellen Moore (Dan Goodale Kick) 0–7

2nd Quarter

- 07:17 AFA–Tim Jefferson 1 Yd Run (Parker Herrington Kick) 7–7
- 04:54 BSU–Matt Miller 19 Yd Pass From Kellen Moore (Pat Blocked) 7–13
- 02:44 BSU–Hunter White 16 Yd Fumble Return (Dan Goodale Kick) 7–20
- 00:00 AFA–Parker Herrington 37 Yd FG 10–20

3rd Quarter

- 07:05 AFA–Parker Herrington 39 Yd FG 13–20
- 02:05 BSU–Doug Martin 15 Yd Run (Dan Goodale Kick) 13–27

4th Quarter

- 09:47 AFA–Asher Clark 3 Yd Run (Parker Herrington Kick) 20–27
- 05:07 BSU–Doug Martin 2 Yd Pass From Kellen Moore (Dan Goodale Kick) 20–34
- 03:31 AFA–Tim Jefferson 1 Yd Run (Pat Blocked) 26–34
- 00:42 BSU–Dan Goodale 25 Yd FG 26–37

Boise State would remain the same in the AP and Harris polls but rise to #5 in the coache's and #4 in the BCS polls. With Oklahoma's home loss to Texas Tech, Boise State now holds the nations longest overall home winning streak at 35, but also have a home regular season home winning streak of 65. Kellen Moore and Byron Hout were named the Mountain West offensive and defensive players of the week. The award was the fourth of the season for Moore. Following the bye week, the Broncos would fall to #5 in the BCS poll and are now #5 in all four major polls.

=== At UNLV ===
	1	2	3	4	Total
No. 5 Broncos	7	14	7	20	48
Rebels	7	7	0	7	21

Uniform Combination
Helmet	Jersey	Pants

Boise State shook off a slow first half and pulled away with four second half touchdowns for their 10th straight win with a 48–21 victory over the Rebels of UNLV. Kellen Moore threw three first half touchdowns, two to Matt Miller, but UNLV was able to match the Broncos first two scores for a 21–14 Boise State lead at halftime. Boise State extended the lead with Moore's fourth touchdown pass from 51 yards out to Tyler Shoemaker for a 28–14 lead at the end of the third quarter. The Broncos opened the fourth quarter by finishing off a 14-play, 64-yard drive, which included a fake punt, with Moore's fifth touchdown off a tipped pass to Shoemaker. D.J. Harper, replacing injured starting running back Doug Martin, went 49 yards on two plays and scored on a 15-yard rush to give the Broncos a 41–14 lead. Both teams traded touchdowns by the second teamers for a final of 48–21. This was Kellen Moore's 46th win, setting a new record for most wins by an NCAA quarterback and surpassing the previous mark set by former Texas quarterback Colt McCoy.

Passing Leaders	Rushing Leaders	Receiving Leaders	Total Yards
Kellen Moore: 18/21, 219 YDS, 5 TDS	D.J. Harper: 13 CAR, 109 YDS, 1 TD, LG of 36	Tyler Shoemaker: 5 REC, 102 YDS, 2 TDS, LG of 51	BSU: 416
Joe Southwick: 3/3, 12 YDS	Drew Wright: 8 CAR, 47 YDS, LG of 15	Matt Miller: 6 REC, 58 YDS, 2 TDS, LG of 30	UNLV: 319
		Geraldo Boldewijn: 2 REC, 22 YDS, LG of 11	

1st Quarter

- 09:26 BSU–Gabe Linehan 2 Yd Pass From Kellen Moore (Dan Goodale Kick) 7–0
- 05:43 UNLV–Dionza Bradford 13 Yd Run (Nolan Kohorst Kick) 7–7

2nd Quarter

- 09:37 BSU–Matt Miller 30 Yd Pass From Kellen Moore (Dan Goodale Kick) 14–7
- 04:49 UNLV–Michael Johnson 33 Yd Pass From Caleb Herring (Nolan Kohorst Kick) 14–14
- 00:25 BSU–Matt Miller 5 Yd Pass From Kellen Moore (Dan Goodale Kick) 21–14

3rd Quarter

- 08:37 BSU–Tyler Shoemaker 51 Yd Pass From Kellen Moore (Dan Goodale Kick) 28–14

4th Quarter

- 14:48 BSU–Tyler Shoemaker 5 Yd Pass From Kellen Moore (Pat Failed) 35–14
- 12:04 BSU–D.J. Harper 36 Yd Run (Dan Goodale Kick) 42–14
- 01:46 BSU–Drew Wright 15 Yd Run (Dan Goodale Kick) 48–14
- 00:30 UNLV–Phillip Payne 13 Yd Pass From Sean Reilly (Nolan Kohorst Kick) 48–21

Boise State would remain at #5 in all three major polls.

=== TCU ===
	1	2	3	4	Total
No. 24 Horned Frogs	7	13	8	8	36
No. 5 Broncos	7	7	14	7	35

Uniform Combination
Helmet	Jersey	Pants

For the second year in a row Boise State's BCS fate was decided by a field goal as #24 TCU knocked off the Broncos when Dan Goodale's final second field goal sailed wide right to give the Horned Frogs a 36–35 win. The Broncos came out fast scoring just four minutes into the game when Kellen Moore found Matt Miller for a 22-yard touchdown. TCU would answer by going deep, first with a 74-yard touchdown pass from Casey Pachall to Josh Boyce, then Pachall found Brandon Carter for a 75-yard touchdown. D.J. Harper would tie the game with a 17-yard touchdown run before Pachall went deep again to Boyce, this time from 69 yards out (PAT failed) for a 20–14 TCU lead at the half. It was the first time the Broncos had trailed at halftime since the 2007 Hawaii Bowl. The lead for TCU did not last for long as Bronco defensive end Tyrone Crawford returned a fumble for a touchdown on the Horned Frogs first play of the second half. Seven minutes later D.J. Harper added his second touchdown run, this time from three yards out for a 28–20 Bronco lead. TCU marched 86 yards, capped off with a Josh Boyce 3-yard touchdown reception, and tied the game after a two-point conversion when Pachall dove for the endzone, just barely breaking the plane. On the first play of the fourth quarter, Kellen Moore connected with Dallas Burroughs for a 54-yard touchdown to put the Broncos up 35–28. Both teams traded punts throughout the fourth before the Broncos got the ball back with 5:37 left. The Broncos ran the clock down to 2:26 before backup running back Drew Wright, playing due to injuries to both Doug Martin and D.J. Harper, fumbled giving TCU the ball at the 27-yard line. Casey Pachall methodically marched the Horned Frogs down the field and found Brandon Carter for a 25-yard touchdown. TCU chose to go for two where Pachall found Boyce on a pass toward the sideline. The Bronco defender went for the interception and missed letting Boyce walk in for the 36–35 lead. After a kickoff out of bounds and a TCU holding penalty, the Broncos where on the 50 with 1:05 to play. After 3 straight incompletions, TCU was controversially flagged for pass interference on fourth down. Two Kellen Moore completions moved the Broncos to the 22-yard line with 21 seconds to play and they had a timeout. They chose to move the ball to the middle of the field to set up a 39-yard field goal which Dan Goodale pushed right. The loss ended the Broncos 65 game regular season home winning streak and 47 game conference home winning streak. Both streaks were the longest ever streaks in the FBS era (since 1978). The loss also ended the longest overall home winning streak at 35.

Passing Leaders	Rushing Leaders	Receiving Leaders	Total Yards
Kellen Moore: 28/38, 320 YDS, 2 TDS	D.J. Harper: 24 CAR, 125 YDS, 2 TDS, LG of 32	Matt Miller: 9 REC, 73 YDS, 1 TD, LG of 22	BSU: 446
	Drew Wright: 3 CAR, 20 YDS, LG of 8	Tyler Shoemaker: 5 REC, 69 YDS, LG of 24	TCU: 506
		Dallas Burroughs: 1 REC, 54 YDS, 1 TD, LG of 54	

1st Quarter

- 11:27 BSU–Matt Miller 22 Yd Pass From Kellen Moore (Dan Goodale Kick) 0–7
- 08:34 TCU–Josh Boyce 74 Yd Pass From Casey Pachall (Ross Evans Kick) 7–7

2nd Quarter

- 13:17 TCU–Brandon Carter 75 Yd Pass From Casey Pachall (Ross Evans Kick) 14–7
- 08:13 BSU–D.J. Harper 17 Yd Run (Dan Goodale Kick) 14–14
- 06:34 TCU–Josh Boyce 69 Yd Pass From Casey Pachall (Pat Failed) 20–14

3rd Quarter

- 14:43 BSU–Tyrone Crawford 32 Yd Fumble Return (Dan Goodale Kick) 20–21
- 07:03 BSU–D.J. Harper 3 Yd Run (Dan Goodale Kick) 20–28
- 02:02 TCU–Josh Boyce 2 Yd Pass From Casey Pachall (Casey Pachall Run For Two-Point Conversion) 28–28

4th Quarter

- 14:47 BSU–Dallas Burroughs 54 Yd Pass From Kellen Moore (Dan Goodale Kick) 28–35
- 01:05 TCU–Brandon Carter 25 Yd Pass From Casey Pachall (Casey Pachall Pass To Josh Boyce For Two-Point Conversion) 36–35

Following the loss, the Broncos fell to #10 in the BCS and AP polls and #11 in the Coaches and Harris polls.

=== At San Diego State ===
	1	2	3	4	Total
No. 11 Broncos	21	21	3	7	52
Aztecs	7	7	0	21	35

Uniform Combination
Helmet	Jersey	Pants

Passing Leaders	Rushing Leaders	Receiving Leaders	Total Yards
Kellen Moore: 28/40, 366 YDS, 4 TDS, 1 INT	Doug Martin: 36 CAR, 129 YDS, 2 TDS, LG of 22	Tyler Shoemaker: 10 REC, 73 YDS, 3 TDS, LG of 24	BSU: 497
	Mitch Burroughs: 1 CAR, 11 YDS, LG of 11	Geraldo Boldewijn: 1 REC, 42 YDS, LG of 42	SDSU: 470
		Kyle Efaw: 2 REC, 21 YDS, 1 TD, LG of 12	

1st Quarter

- 11:42 BSU–Tyler Shoemaker 5 Yd Pass From Kellen Moore (Dan Goodale Kick) 7–0
- 05:23 BSU–Mitch Burroughs 11 Yd Run (Dan Goodale Kick) 14–0
- 03:16 BSU–Tyler Shoemaker 14 Yd Pass From Kellen Moore (Dan Goodale Kick) 21–0
- 01:38 SDSU–Adam Muema 81 Yd Run (Abelardo Perez Kick) 21–7

2nd Quarter

- 12:07 BSU–Kyle Efaw 9 Yd Pass From Kellen Moore (Dan Goodale Kick) 28–7
- 11:25 SDSU–Gavin Escobar 30 Yd Pass From Ryan Lindley (Abelardo Perez Kick) 28–14
- 05:49 BSU–Doug Martin 10 Yd Run (Michael Frisina Kick) 35–14
- 00:47 BSU–Tyler Shoemaker 24 Yd Pass From Kellen Moore (Michael Frisina Kick) 42–14

3rd Quarter

- 09:20 BSU–Michael Frisina 30 Yd FG 45–14

4th Quarter

- 10:12 SDSU–Gavin Escobar 30 Yd Pass From Ryan Lindley (Abelardo Perez Kick) 45–21
- 06:25 SDSU–Adam Muema 5 Yd Run (Ryan Lindley Pass To Gavin Escobar For Two-Point Conversion) 45–29
- 04:11 BSU–Doug Martin 22 Yd Run (Michael Frisina Kick) 52–29
- 00:05 SDSU–Adam Muema 1 Yd Pass From Ryan Lindley (Two-Point Conversion Failed) 52–35

=== Wyoming ===
	1	2	3	4	Total
Cowboys	7	0	0	7	14
No. 8 Broncos	0	13	16	7	36

Uniform Combination
Helmet	Jersey	Pants

Passing Leaders	Rushing Leaders	Receiving Leaders	Total Yards
Kellen Moore: 24/36, 279 YDS, 3 TDS, 1 INT	Doug Martin: 26 CAR, 153 YDS, 2 TDS, LG of 26	Matt Miller: 4 REC, 66 YDS, 1 TD, LG of 46	BSU: 497
	D.J. Harper: 9 CAR, 35 YDS, LG of 9	Tyler Shoemaker: 4 REC, 53 YDS, LG of 18	WYO: 191
		Kyle Efaw: 2 REC, 23 YDS, 1 TD, LG of 13	

1st Quarter

- 09:52 WYO–Luke Anderson 29 Yd Interception Return (Daniel Sullivan Kick) 7–0

2nd Quarter

- 01:10 BSU–Doug Martin 2 Yd Run (Michael Frisina Kick) 7–7
- 00:00 BSU–Matt Miller 46 Yd Pass From Kellen Moore (Pat Blocked) 7–13

3rd Quarter

- 12:16 BSU–Michael Frisina 23 Yd FG 7–16
- 06:16 BSU–Kyle Efaw 10 Yd Pass From Kellen Moore (Two-Point Run Conversion Failed) 7–22
- 02:20 BSU–Gabe Linehan 17 Yd Pass From Kellen Moore (Michael Frisina Kick) 7–29

4th Quarter

- 13:13 BSU–Doug Martin 1 Yd Run (Michael Frisina Kick) 7–36
- 05:26 WYO–Josh Doctson 8 Yd Pass From Brett Smith (Daniel Sullivan Kick) 14–36

=== New Mexico ===
	1	2	3	4	Total
Lobos	0	0	0	0	0
No. 8 Broncos	21	10	7	7	45

Uniform Combination
Helmet	Jersey	Pants

Passing Leaders	Rushing Leaders	Receiving Leaders	Total Yards
Kellen Moore: 28/33, 313 YDS, 3 TDS	Doug Martin: 22 CAR, 110 YDS, 2 TDS, LG of 40	Tyler Shoemaker: 7 REC, 106 YDS, 1 TD, LG of 31	BSU: 543
	Drew Wright: 4 CAR, 29 YDS, 1 TD, LG of 30	Matt Miller: 5 REC, 62 YDS, LG of 19	UNM: 197
	D.J. Harper: 9 CAR, 39 YDS, LG of 6	Mitch Burroughs: 6 REC, 59 YDS, LG of 15	

1st Quarter

- 07:57 BSU–Kyle Efaw 2 Yd Pass From Kellen Moore (Michael Frisina Kick) 0–7
- 04:40 BSU–Tyler Shoemaker 16 Yd Pass From Kellen Moore (Michael Frisina Kick) 0–14
- 01:35 BSU–Doug Martin 4 Yd Run (Michael Frisina Kick) 0–21

2nd Quarter

- 07:49 BSU–Gabe Linehan 15 Yd Pass From Kellen Moore (Michael Frisina Kick) 0–28
- 00:00 BSU–Michael Frisina 30 Yd FG 0–31

3rd Quarter

- 07:20 BSU–Doug Martin 40 Yd Run (Dan Goodale Kick) 0–38

4th Quarter

- 05:01 BSU–Drew Wright 30 Yd Run (Dan Goodale Kick) 0–45

=== Arizona State–Maaco Bowl Las Vegas ===
	1	2	3	4	Total
Sun Devils	0	3	7	14	24
#6 Broncos	14	14	7	21	56

2nd meeting. 0–1 all time. Last meeting 1996, 56–7 Sun Devils win in Tempe.

Uniform Combination
Helmet	Jersey	Pants

== Rankings ==
Ranking movements Legend: ██ Increase in ranking ██ Decrease in ranking ( ) = First-place votes
	Week															
Poll	Pre	1	2	3	4	5	6	7	8	9	10	11	12	13	14	Final
AP	5 (2)	4 (2)	4 (2)	4 (2)	4 (1)	5 (1)	5 (1)	5 (1)	5 (1)	5 (1)	5 (1)	10	7	9	8	8
Coaches	7	5	4	4	5	6	6	7	5	5	5	11	8	8	6	6
Harris	Not released						5 (1)	5 (1)	5	5	5	11	8	8	6	Not released
BCS	Not released							5	4	5	5	10	7	7	7	Not released

== Statistics ==
=== Scores by quarter ===
	1	2	3	4	Total
Boise State	154	168	140	113	575
Opponents	41	56	32	114	243

== NFL draft ==
2011 Boise State set a team record for number of players taken in one draft with six. The previous record was held by the 2006 team that had four players taken in the 2007 NFL draft. For the first time in school history, the Broncos had two players selected in the first round of the NFL draft. They had only had two previous players ever selected in the first round (Ryan Clady in 2008 and Kyle Wilson in 2010).

1st Round, 19th Overall Pick by the Chicago Bears—Sr. DL Shea McClellin

1st Round, 31st Overall Pick by the Tampa Bay Buccaneers—Sr. RB Doug Martin

3rd Round, 81st Overall Pick by the Dallas Cowboys—Sr. DL Tyrone Crawford

5th Round, 167th Overall Pick by the Cincinnati Bengals—Sr. S George Iloka

6th Round, 202nd Overall Pick by the Cleveland Browns—Sr. DL Billy Winn

7th Round, 221st Overall Pick by the Arizona Cardinals—Sr. OL Nate Potter

== Roster ==
No.	Name	Pos.	Ht.	Wt.	Cls.	Hometown (H.S./Prev. Exp.)
2	Matt Miller	WR	6–3	215	Fr.	Helena, Montana (Capital HS)
3	Chris Potter	WR	5–9	158	Jr.	Westlake Village, California (Oaks Christian HS)
4	Jerrell Gavin-Paul	CB	5–9	171	Sr.	Miami, Florida (El Camino JC) (South Miami Senior HS)
5	Jamar Taylor	CB	5–11	194	Jr.	San Diego, California (Helix HS)
6	Dextrell Simmons	N	5–10	203	Jr.	Houston, Texas (Blinn JC) (Westfield HS)
7	D.J. Harper	RB	5–9	210	Sr.	Cypress, Texas (Cypress Creek HS)
8	George Iloka	S	6–3	216	Sr.	Houston, Texas (Kempner HS)
9	Grant Hedrick	QB	6–0	191	Fr.	Independence, Oregon (Central HS)
10	Jeremy Ioane	RB	5–10	197	Fr.	Honolulu(Punahou School)
11	Kellen Moore	QB	6–0	191	Sr.	Prosser, Washington (Prosser HS)
13	Blake Renaud	LB	6–2	235	Fr.	Concord, California (De La Salle HS)
14	Trevor Cockman	K/P	6-2	203	So.	Beaverton, Oregon (Southridge HS)
14	Jimmy Laughrea	QB	6–2	197	Fr.	Rocklin, California (Rocklin HS)
15	Tyler Jackson	WR	6–0	193	Jr.	Castle Rock, Colorado (Douglas County HS)
16	Joe Southwick	QB	6–1	197	So.	Danville, California (San Ramon Valley HS)
16	Cedric Febis	DB	6–3	202	Sr.	Amsterdam, Netherlands (Bishop Kelly HS in Boise, Idaho)
17	Geraldo Boldewijn	WR	6–4	200	So.	Amsterdam, Netherlands (Capital HS)
18	Aaron Burks	WR	6–2	191	Sr.	Grand Prairie, Texas (Mansfield Timberview HS)
19	Josh Borgman	CB	5–7	172	Jr.	Boise, Idaho (Centennial HS)
20	Mitch Burroughs	WR	5–9	187	Jr.	Meridian, Idaho (Meridian HS)
20	Mitch Burroughs	WR	5–9	187	Jr.	Meridian, Idaho (Meridian HS)
22	Doug Martin	RB	5–9	215	Jr.	Stockton, California (Saint Mary's HS)
23	Eric Agbaroji	DB	6–11	195	Fr.	Midlothian, Texas (Midlothian HS)
24	Malcolm Johnson	RB	5–11	200	So.	Gresham, Oregon (Barlow HS)
24	Hazen Moss	DB	5–11	197	Jr.	Rifle, Colorado (Rifle HS)
25	Hunter White	N	5–11	206	Sr.	Huntington Beach, California (Edison HS)
26	Quaylon Ewing-Burton	CB	6–0	184	So.	Houston, Texas (Kempner HS)
27	Jay Ajayi	RB	6–0	208	Fr.	Plano, Texas (Frisco Liberty HS)
28	Phillip Hogan	RB	5–6	165	Fr.	Honolulu (Waipahu HS)
28	Dillon Lukehart	LB	6–0	200	Fr.	Eagle, Idaho (Eagle HS)
29	Lee Hightower	DB	6–1	170	Fr.	Inglewood, California (Loyola HS)
30	Travis Stanaway	S	5–11	203	Sr.	Clyde Hill, WA (Bellevue HS)
31	Antwon Murray	CB	5–11	176	Sr.	Lakeland, Florida (Kathleen HS)
32	Jonathan Brown	S	5–10	220	So.	Alameda, California (Encinal HS)
32	Jake Hardee	TE	6–3	236	Fr.	Boise, Idaho (Bishop Kelly HS)
33	Tommy Smith	LB	6–1	227	Jr.	Atlanta, Georgia (North Atlanta HS)
34	Taylor Loffler	S	6–4	200	Fr.	Kelowna, BC, Canada (Kelowna Secondary School)
34	Kirby Moore	WR	6–2	205	So.	Prosser, WA (Prosser HS)
35	Zach Keiser	RB	5–9	185	Fr.	Hayden, Idaho (Coeur d'Alene HS)
35	Darian Thompson	DB	6–1	180	Fr.	Lancaster, California (Paraclete HS)
36	Aaron Tevis	LB	6–3	232	Sr.	Tucson, Arizona (Canyon Del Oro HS)
37	Michael Frisina	K	5–5	153	Jr.	Brea, California (Saddleback JC) (Brea Olinda HS)
37	Ebenezer Makinde	CB	5–11	172	So.	Phoenix, Arizona (Paradise Valley HS)
38	Corey Bell	N	5–11	200	Fr.	Boise, Idaho (Capital HS)
38	Raphiel Lambert	CB	5–11	210	Jr.	Portland, Oregon (Jesuit HS)
39	Drew Wright	FB	5–9	198	Jr.	Nampa, Idaho (Vallivue HS)
40	Tyrone Crawford	DE	6–4	276	Sr.	Windsor, Ontario, Canada (Bakersfield College) (Catholic Central HS)
41	Dan Goodale	K	5–9	183	Fr.	Boise, Idaho (Timberline HS)
41	Kharyee Marshall	DE	6–1	216	So.	Phoenix, Arizona (Washington HS)
42	Jamal Wilson	FB	6–1	230	Fr.	Fontana, California (A.B. Miller HS)
42	Matt Wilson	LB	6–1	228	Sr.	Powell, Wyoming (Powell HS)
43	Ricky Tjong-A-Tjoe	DT	6–3	307	So.	Amsterdam, Netherlands (Boise HS, in Boise, Idaho)
44	Chris Roberson	LS	6–0	232	Jr.	Katy, Texas (Katy HS)
45	Travis Saxton	LB	6–1	214	Fr.	Star, Idaho (Eagle HS)
46	Bryan Douglas	CB	5–9	162	Fr.	Los Angeles, California (Narbonne HS)
47	Dan Paul	FB	6–0	250	Sr.	Boring, Oregon (Sam Barlow HS)
48	J.C. Percy	LB	6–0	222	Jr.	Blackfoot, Idaho (Blackfoot HS)
49	Billy Derome	N	5–11	191	So.	Mountain Home, Idaho (Mountain Home HS)
49	Brad Elkin	P	6-2	201	Sr.	Tacoma, WA (Bellarmine Prep HS)
50	Dakota Shackelton	LS			Fr.	Shingletown, California (Foothill HS)
51	Mitchell McCarthy	LB	6–0	210	Fr.	Danville, California (Monte Vista HS)
53	Martin Beau	DL			So.	Lakewood, Colorado (CSU-Pueblo) (JK Mullen HS)
54	Michael Ames	OL	6–4	291	Jr.	Boise, Idaho (Centennial HS)
55	Chuck Hayes	OL	6–2	291	Sr.	Auroro, Colorado (Eaglecrest HS)
56	Dustin Kamper	LB	6–0	212	Fr.	Meridian, Idaho (Nampa Christian HS)
58	Robert Ash	DL	6–3	262	Fr.	Elk Grove, California (Cosumnes Oaks HS)
61	Joe Kellogg	OL	6–2	299	Jr.	Scottsdale, Arizona (Saguaro HS)
62	Chris Tozer	OL	6–3	305	Jr.	San Jose, California (Foothill CC) (Valley Christian HS)
63	Adam Sheffield	OL	6–4	300	Fr.	San Jose, California (Branham HS)
64	Brenel Myers	OG	6–2	277	Jr.	Houston, Texas (Westfield HS)
65	Matt Paradis	DT	6–1	286	So.	Council, Idaho (Council HS)
66	Thomas Byrd	C	5–11	288	Sr.	San Pablo, California (McClymond HS)
67	Rees Odhiambo	OL	6–4	296	Fr.	Mansfield, Texas (Mansfield Legacy HS)
68	David Cushing	LB	6–0	267	Fr.	Caldwell, Idaho (Vallivue HS)
69	Tyler Horn	DE	6–4	256	Fr.	Meridian, Idaho (Mountain View HS)
71	Greg Dohmen	OL	6–2	270	Fr.	Red Bluff, California (Red Bluff HS)
72	Marcus Henry	OL	6–2	280	Fr.	Bellevue, WA (Bellevue HS)
73	Nate Potter	OL	6–6	300	Sr.	Boise, Idaho (Timberline HS)
74	Cory Yriarte	OL	6–1	282	Sr.	Palmdale, California (Oaks Christian HS)
75	Faraji Wright	OT	6–3	291	Jr.	Vallejo, California (Berkeley HS)
76	Jake Broyles	OL	6–4	278	So.	Henderson, Nevada (Foothill HS)
77	Spencer Gerke	OL	6–3	290	So.	Boise, Idaho (Bishop Kelly HS)
78	Charles Leno Jr.	OT	6–3	278	So.	Oakland, California (San Leandro HS)
79	Bronson Durrant	OL	6–3	260	Jr.	Eugene, Oregon (Marist HS)
80	Kyle Efaw	TE	6–4	242	Sr.	Boise, Idaho (Capital HS)
81	Nick Alexander	DE	6–4	243	So.	Los Angeles (Crenshaw HS)
81	Anthony Clarke	WR	5–8	180	Fr.	Blackfoot, Idaho (Blackfoot HS)
82	Dallas Burroughs	WR	5–9	170	Fr.	Meridian, Idaho (Rocky Mountain HS)
82	Samuel Ukwuachu	DE	6–5	210	Fr.	Pearland, Texas (Pearland HS)
83	Troy Ware	WR	6–1	181	Fr.	Oceanside, California (Vista HS)
84	Cory Brehm	WR	6–0	185	Fr.	Granite Bay, California (Granite Bay HS)
85	Holden Huff	TE	6–5	203	Fr.	Rocklin, California (Rocklin HS)
86	Kyle Sosnowski	TE	6–1	228	Fr.	Boise, Idaho (Capital HS)
87	Gabe Linehan	TE	6–3	232	So.	Banks, Oregon (Banks HS)
88	Chandler Koch	TE	6–2	250	Jr.	Flower Mound, Texas (Flower Mound HS)
89	Tyler Shoemaker	WR	6–1	207	Sr.	Meridian, Idaho (Mountain View HS)
90	Billy Winn	DT	6–4	295	Sr.	Las Vegas, Nevada (Las Vegas HS)
91	Greg Grimes	DT	6–0	288	Jr.	Sacramento, California (Inderkum HS)
92	Shae McClellin	DE	6–3	258	Sr.	Caldwell, Idaho (Marsing HS)
93	Justin Jungblut	DT	6–4	269	So.	Scottsdale, Arizona (Saguaro HS)
94	Byron Hout	LB	6–0	240	Sr.	Coeur d'Alene, Idaho (Lake City HS)
95	Darren Koontz	DE	6–3	281	Jr.	Los Alamitos, California (Los Alamitos HS)
96	Jarrell Root	DE	6–3	268	Sr.	Boise, Idaho (Capital HS)
97	Chase Baker	DT	6–1	296	Sr.	Rocklin, California (Rocklin HS)
98	Jeffrey Worthy	DT	6–4	285	Fr.	La Mirada, California (Whittier Christian HS)
99	Michael Atkinson	DT	6–0	320	Jr.	Windsor, Ontario, Canada (Catholic Central HS)
