= Prosser High School =

School in Prosser, Washington

Coordinates: 46°12′14″N 119°45′58″W

Location
- 1500 Paterson Rd; Prosser, Washington 99350

Information
- Principal: Bryan Bailey
- Teaching staff: 44.25 (FTE)
- Grades: 9 -12
- Enrollment: 860 (2023-2024)
- Student to teacher ratio: 19.44
- Colors: Red and White
- Athletics: WIAA Class 2A
- Mascot: Mustang
- Website: www.prosserschools.org/o/phs/

Prosser High School is a school in Prosser, Washington. It is the main high school in the Prosser School District, though there is also an alternative Prosser Falls Education Center. The school has around 920 students attending in grades 9 through 12. The mascot is the Mustang and the school colors are red and white.

== New campus ==
The school district built a new, larger high school to replace the existing campus, which was built in 1936. The former campus was overcrowded and run-down, with about 900 students attending a facility built for 500 students. District officials held bond elections three times without success, once in 2005 and again in February and April 2011, in an attempt to get voter approval of a new school. In February 2017, another election was held and the bond passed with a 73% vote yes. Construction on the new high school began in May 2019 and was finished in 2021.

== Notable alumni ==
- Salvador Mendoza Jr., American circuit court judge
- Kellen Moore, Head Football Coach New Orleans Saints NFL, former NFL quarterback
- Kirby Moore, American football coach
