= Kellen Moore =

American football coach and player (born 1988)

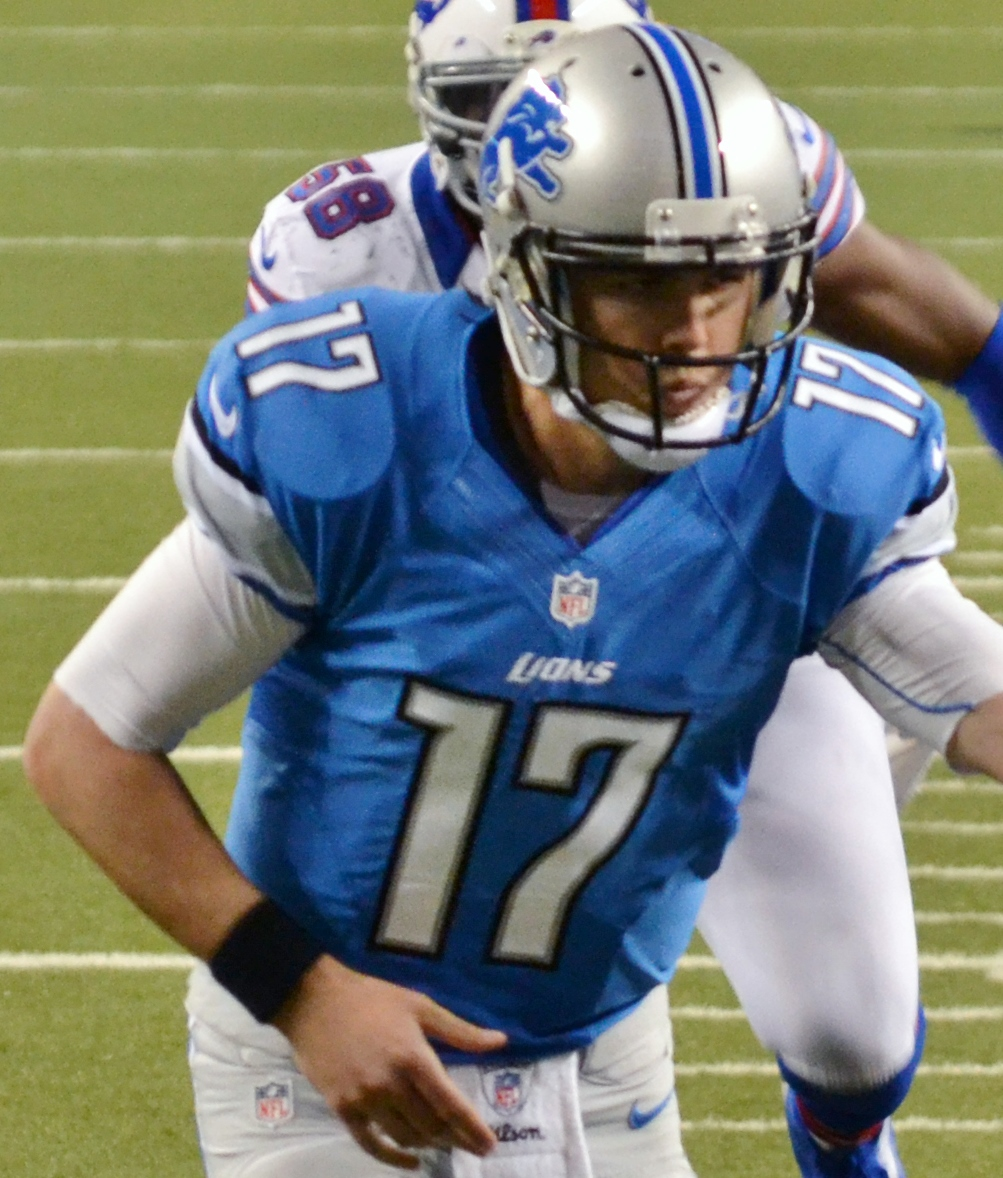
- Moore with the Detroit Lions in 2012

New Orleans Saints
- Title: Head coach

Personal information
- Born: July 5, 1988 (age 38); Prosser, Washington, U.S.
- Listed height: 6 ft 0 in (1.83 m)
- Listed weight: 202 lb (92 kg)

Career information
- Position: Quarterback (No. 17)
- High school: Prosser
- College: Boise State (2007–2011)
- NFL draft: 2012: undrafted

Career history

Playing
- Detroit Lions (2012–2014); Dallas Cowboys (2015–2017)

Coaching
- Dallas Cowboys (2018–2022); Quarterbacks coach (2018); Offensive coordinator (2019–2022); Los Angeles Chargers (2023) Offensive coordinator; Philadelphia Eagles (2024) Offensive coordinator; New Orleans Saints (2025–present) Head coach

Awards and highlights
- Playing: 2× Quarterback of the Year (2010, 2011); 2× First-team All-American (2009, 2010); NCAA passer rating leader (2010); NCAA completion percentage leader (2011); 2× WAC Offensive Player of the Year (2009, 2010); MW Offensive Player of the Year (2011); WAC Freshman of the Year (2008); 2× First-team All-WAC (2009, 2010); First-team All-MW (2011); Second-team All-WAC (2008); Coaching: Super Bowl champion (LIX)

Career NFL statistics
- Passing attempts: 104
- Passing completions: 61
- Completion percentage: 58.7%
- TD–INT: 4–6
- Passing yards: 779
- Passer rating: 71.0
- Stats at Pro Football Reference

Head coaching record
- Regular season: 9–18 (.333)
- Coaching profile at Pro Football Reference

Kellen Christopher Moore (born July 5, 1988) is an American professional football coach and former quarterback who is the head coach for the New Orleans Saints of the National Football League (NFL). He played college football for the Boise State Broncos, receiving Quarterback of the Year twice between 2010 and 2011 and setting the Football Bowl Subdivision (FBS) record for quarterback wins. Moore spent most of his professional career from 2012 to 2017 as a backup, seeing playing time with the Dallas Cowboys in 2015.

After retiring as a player, Moore began a coaching career. He served as the offensive coordinator for the Philadelphia Eagles in 2024, winning Super Bowl LIX. Moore was named the Saints' head coach the following season.

== Early life ==
Kellen Christopher Moore was born on July 5, 1988, in Prosser, Washington. His father, Tom, was the head coach at Prosser High School from 1986 to 2008, winning 21 league titles and four state championships. Every day during football season, he and younger brother Kirby, who also played at Boise State as a wide receiver and is now the head coach at Washington State, went from the elementary school to their father’s football practice. As Kellen’s father remembered in a 2011 interview, "He'd always have a little notepad with him. He was always drawing plays." In his final two years of high school, Moore’s father let him call his own plays.

According to his mother, Moore "grew fast, and then he didn't grow again" – he was 5 ft 11 in (1.80 m) as a high school sophomore, nearly his adult height. His lack of height proved no obstacle to success at Prosser High. Moore was named the Gatorade Player of the Year for the state of Washington. He lettered in football and basketball three times each and was named Velocity/Prep Star All-American and First-team All-state and Division 2A MVP by the Seattle Times. Moore earned league player of the year honors as well as First-team All-league recognition as a sophomore, junior and senior. He was also Third-team All-state selection as a junior.

Moore set Washington state career records for completions (787) and touchdown passes (173). He also set state single-season records for completions (317 as a junior), yards (4,600 as a junior) and touchdown passes (67 as a senior).

Moore finished his career completing 787 of 1,195 passes (.659) for 11,367 yards and 173 touchdowns with 34 interceptions. He led Prosser to a 12–1 record in 2006 as a senior and a spot in the state semifinals, where his team lost to the Centralia Tigers and Moore threw two interceptions. As a junior, he completed 317 of 479 passes (66.2 percent) for 4,600 yards and 66 touchdowns with 15 interceptions. The year before as a sophomore, he completed 179 of 308 passes (58.1 percent) for 2,442 yards and 39 touchdowns with 11 interceptions.

Moore's teammates at Boise State included his younger brother Kirby and childhood friend Cory Yriarte, a center for the Broncos. Kirby currently holds the national high school record for career touchdown receptions, with 95.

== College career ==
=== 2007 ===
During the 2007 season, Moore was redshirted.

=== 2008 ===
As a redshirt freshman in 2008, Moore led the Broncos to an undefeated regular season and the WAC championship while throwing 25 touchdowns and 9 interceptions in 12 games. Moore did not start the regular season finale against Fresno State, as senior backup quarterback Bush Hamdan was given the ceremonial Senior day start and took the opening series; Moore entered the game immediately thereafter, played the majority of the contest, and was later removed during the 61–10 victory. This marked the only game of Moore’s collegiate career in which he did not start. In the final game of 2008, Boise State lost to Texas Christian University (TCU) in the 2008 Poinsettia Bowl, the first of two consecutive bowl meetings for the non-Automatic Qualifying rivals. He was named WAC Freshman of the Year and Second-team All-conference after a spectacular first season, guiding Boise State to 12–1 record and was named Boise State's Most Valuable Offensive Player by vote of teammates. He was named to Phil Steele Publications' Second-team All-WAC and also voted to the Football Writers Association of America's freshman All-America team.

He ranked 12th in nation in passing efficiency and 24th in total offense, averaging 265.85 yards per game and was first in WAC in passing efficiency (157.1) and second in total offense (265.8) and average passing yards per game (268.2). He completed 281 of 405 passes for 3,486 yards with 25 touchdowns and 10 interceptions.

=== 2009 ===
In January 2009, Moore was ranked as the 37th-best returning player in college football by College Football News.

Moore threw for a school record 39 touchdowns with only 3 interceptions to lead the Broncos to a 14–0 record, another WAC title, and an at large bid to the Fiesta Bowl vs. undefeated #4 ranked TCU. The 2009 Fiesta Bowl was highly controversial due to the decision to pit the two non-Automatic Qualifying schools against each other instead of having them face Automatic Qualifying teams. The BCS was criticized for the perception that the risk of both, or either, team defeating a "power conference" team was too great, and that the BCS had TCU and BSU face each other so that the damage of their participation would be minimized. He finished the 2009 regular season with the highest passer efficiency rating in Division I-A with a rating of 167.3. In his first two years as a starting quarterback, Moore did not lose a regular season game.

Moore started against widely favored TCU in the Fiesta Bowl and played the entire game. He had no interceptions, fumbles, or muffed snaps. He led the team on a 4th quarter 78-yard touchdown scoring drive to take the lead for good and win the game 17–10.

He was named First-team All-American by CBSSportsline.com, a subsidiary of CBS Sports. He was named one of ten finalists for the Manning Award. He was also First-team All-WAC and the WAC Offensive Player of the Year in 2009 and finished seventh in Heisman voting for 2009.

=== 2010 ===
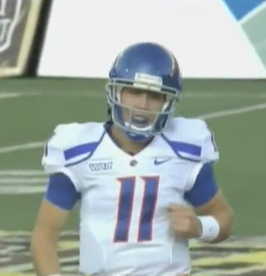
Moore in 2010

Moore led the Broncos to a 33–30 victory over Virginia Tech on September 6, 2010. The game was highly anticipated and received a 6.8 TV rating, nearly twice that of the next most watched game. Moore contributed 3 passing touchdowns in the game with a final game-winning strike to Austin Pettis with 1:14 remaining in the game. As a result of the victory, Boise State received 8 first place votes in the week 2 AP Poll, and it moved up to third in the Coaches' Poll. Moore was also mentioned by major sports media as a top candidate for the 2010 Heisman Trophy. After finishing the season with 3,506 yards, 33 touchdowns, five interceptions, and an NCAA-leading passer rating of 182.6, Moore was named a finalist for the Heisman Trophy and was invited to the ceremony in New York City to become the first ever Boise State player to be a Heisman finalist. Moore finished fourth in Heisman voting. Moore was also a finalist for the Davey O'Brien Award, the Maxwell Award, and the Manning Award (all won by Cam Newton). Moore was named the Touchdown Club of Columbus Quarterback of the Year. Boise State was invited to the 2010 Maaco Bowl Las Vegas, where they defeated Utah 26–3.

=== 2011 ===
On March 28, 2011, the Sporting News named Moore as the #1 player in their annual list of the top 25 players in the nation. He was ranked ahead of Stanford quarterback Andrew Luck and Oregon running back LaMichael James who both finished ahead of Moore in the 2010 Heisman voting. He only needed 8 wins during the 2011 season to pass Colt McCoy for most wins by a quarterback in NCAA history. He threw his 100th touchdown pass against Georgia during week one. Following an opening season win against Georgia in the Chick-fil-A Kickoff Game, Moore was featured on the cover of Sports Illustrated, distributed only in the west.

With the Broncos defeat of Air Force on October 22, he tied former Texas quarterback Colt McCoy for the career wins record with 45 wins. On November 5, the Broncos defeated UNLV and Moore broke the record to become the FBS leader in career wins for a starting quarterback at 46. A perfect season, however, was spoiled again by a 36–35 loss to TCU.

Moore finished eighth in Heisman Trophy voting. He became the 15th player in Heisman Trophy voting history to finish in the top ten three times. He was one of three finalists for the Maxwell Award along with Andrew Luck and Trent Richardson (won by Luck). For the second year in a row, he was named the Touchdown Club of Columbus Quarterback of the Year and it was announced that beginning in 2012 the award will be known as the Kellen Moore Award. He ended 2011 ranked first in the FBS in completion percentage. With the Broncos' 56–24 win over Arizona State in the 2011 Maaco Bowl Las Vegas, Moore became the first quarterback in FBS history to win 46 games in his career finishing with a 49–3 record.

== Professional playing career ==
=== Pre-draft ===
Pre-draft measurables
Height	Weight	Arm length	Hand span	Wingspan	40-yard dash	10-yard split	20-yard split	20-yard shuttle	Three-cone drill	Vertical jump	Broad jump	Wonderlic
6 ft 0 in (1.83 m)	197 lb (89 kg)	30 1/4 in (0.77 m)	9 1/2 in (0.24 m)	6 ft 0 1/8 in (1.83 m)	4.94 s	1.77 s	2.78 s	4.56 s	7.41 s	27.0 in (0.69 m)	8 ft 3 in (2.51 m)	26
All values from NFL Combine

Despite his success in college, many analysts doubted Moore's professional potential, especially his relatively small stature at, according to his Boise State Pro Day, slightly shorter than 6 ft 0 in (1.83 m), as well as doubts about arm strength and mobility. Moore was projected as a late draft pick or priority free agent.

=== Detroit Lions ===
Moore was not selected in the 2012 NFL draft, but was signed immediately post-draft by the Detroit Lions. Upon being signed by Detroit, he stated, "I don't think there will probably be a more motivated quarterback." While some within the media voiced an opinion that Moore should unseat the newly signed Dan Orlovsky as the Lions primary backup during the 2014 season, Lions head coach Jim Caldwell decided Orlovsky would remain the incumbent.

On February 21, 2014, it was announced the Lions would not place a restricted free agent tender offer on Moore, allowing him to explore other NFL options. Despite not tendering an offer, Lions General Manager Martin Mayhew expressed an interest in bringing Moore back for the 2015 season.

On March 6, 2015, the Lions signed Moore to a two-year contract worth $1.825 million. On September 5, following the team's preseason, Moore failed to make the initial 53-player roster and was released during the team's final cuts of training camp.

=== Dallas Cowboys ===
On September 6, 2015, Moore was signed to the Dallas Cowboys' practice squad, reuniting with former Lions offensive coordinator Scott Linehan. After Tony Romo first fractured his left collarbone, he was promoted to the active roster to serve as Brandon Weeden's backup on September 23. Moore was the team's backup for two games, until the Cowboys acquired quarterback Matt Cassel. On November 10, Moore was waived and re-signed two days later to the practice squad.

After Romo suffered a second fracture of the collarbone in a Thanksgiving loss against the Carolina Panthers, Moore was promoted to the active roster on December 2 to serve as Cassel's backup. During Romo's absence, the Cowboys tried relying on backup quarterbacks Weeden (0–3) and Cassel (1–6), but were unsuccessful.

On December 19, Moore played in his first career regular season game against the New York Jets, replacing an ineffective Cassel. Moore's second career NFL pass was intercepted by Marcus Gilchrist. On the next drive, Moore threw his first career touchdown, connecting with Dez Bryant. He was intercepted two more times in the second half, including once in the end zone, when the Cowboys had a chance to go ahead 17–9 in the third quarter.

The loss against the Jets officially eliminated the Cowboys from playoff contention, which led the organization to decide to use the last two regular season games to audition Moore. His first career start came the following week against the Buffalo Bills, completing 13-of-31 passes and throwing a third quarter interception to AJ Tarpley as the Cowboys lost 16–6.

In his first home start, playing against the Washington Redskins, Moore threw for 435 yards, three touchdowns, and two interceptions during the 34–23 loss. He became the fifth quarterback in team history to throw for 400 or more yards in a single game and also passed for the sixth-most yards in team history in a single game.

In 2016, Moore suffered a fractured fibula on his right leg during a training camp practice on August 2 and was placed on injured reserve on August 30.

On March 20, 2017, Moore re-signed with the Cowboys. He was released by the Cowboys on September 2, but was re-signed three days later. He was released on October 26 and re-signed to the practice squad.

=== Retirement ===
In 2018, Moore retired from the NFL. Following his retirement, Moore was the last left-handed quarterback to play in the NFL until Tua Tagovailoa in 2020.

== Coaching career ==
=== Dallas Cowboys ===
In 2018, after retiring from the NFL, Moore became the Cowboys' quarterbacks coach after long-time coach Wade Wilson retired. On January 31, 2019, the Cowboys announced that Moore had been promoted to offensive coordinator. He helped lead the Cowboys' to the top-ranked unit in the NFL by total yardage in the 2019 season. Following Jason Garrett's release as Cowboys' head coach after 10 seasons, FOX NFL insider Jay Glazer reported new coach Mike McCarthy had expressed interest to keep Moore on the coaching staff, which McCarthy did. He led the 2021 Cowboys to the top-ranked offense by total yards and points scored.

On January 29, 2023, after their playoff exit, the Cowboys and Moore mutually agreed to part ways.

=== Los Angeles Chargers ===
On January 30, 2023, Moore was hired by the Los Angeles Chargers as their new offensive coordinator under third-year head coach Brandon Staley. Following a 5–12 season in which Staley was fired, Moore was not retained by incoming Chargers coach Jim Harbaugh.

=== Philadelphia Eagles ===
On February 5, 2024, the Philadelphia Eagles named Moore their new offensive coordinator. In his lone season as coordinator, he helped lead the Eagles to the second-ranked rushing offense in the league while the Eagles won the NFC East. During the NFC Championship Game, they scored 55 points, the most by a team in any NFC championship Game. The Eagles would go on to beat the Kansas City Chiefs in Super Bowl LIX by a score of 40–22.

=== New Orleans Saints ===
On February 11, 2025, Moore was hired as the head coach of the New Orleans Saints. In his first season leading the team, the Saints finished in last place in the NFC South with a 6–11 record.

== Career statistics ==
=== Playing career ===
==== NFL ====
Year	Team	Games			Passing								Rushing			
Year	Team	GP	GS	Record	Cmp	Att	Pct	Yds	Y/A	TD	Int	Rtg	Att	Yds	Avg	TD
2012	DET	0	0	—	DNP											
2013	DET	0	0	—	DNP											
2014	DET	0	0	—	DNP											
2015	DAL	3	2	0–2	61	104	58.7	779	7.5	4	6	71.0	2	−1	−0.5	0
2016	DAL	0	0	—	DNP											
2017	DAL	0	0	—	DNP											
Total		3	2	0–2	61	104	58.7	779	7.5	4	6	71.0	2	−1	−0.5	0

==== College ====
Legend
	FBS record
	Led the NCAA
**Bold**	Career high

Year	Team	Games (Note: On November 28, 2008, against Fresno State, senior backup quarterback Bush Hamdan took the opening snap and series as part of the ceremonial Senior Day start and was credited with the win, as the official starter is awarded the win if the team wins even when removed after the first play.)			Passing								Rushing			
Year	Team	GP	GS	Record	Cmp	Att	Pct	Yds	Y/A	TD	Int	Rtg	Att	Yds	Avg	TD
2007	Boise State	0	0	—	Redshirted (redshirt)											
2008	Boise State	13	12	11–1	281	405	69.4	3,486	8.6	25	**10**	157.1	**38**	−30	−0.8	**1**
2009	Boise State	**14**	**14**	**14–0**	277	431	64.3	3,536	8.2	39	3	161.7	24	**−5**	**−0.2**	**1**
2010	Boise State	13	13	12–1	273	383	71.3	**3,845**	**10.0**	39	6	**182.6**	19	−32	−1.7	**1**
2011	Boise State	13	13	12–1	**326**	**439**	**74.3**	3,800	8.7	**43**	9	175.2	20	−66	−3.3	0
Career		53	52	49–3	1,157	1,658	69.8	14,667	8.8	142	28	169.0	101	-133	-1.3	3

=== Head coaching record ===
Team	Year	Regular season					Postseason			
Team	Year	Won	Lost	Ties	Win %	Finish	Won	Lost	Win %	Result
NO	2025	6	11	0	.353	4th in NFC South	—	—	—	—
NO	2026	3	5	0	.375	TBD	—	—	—	—
Total		9	16	0	.360		0	0	.000	

== Personal life ==
Moore is a member of the Church of Jesus Christ of Latter-day Saints.

== See also ==
- List of NCAA Division I FBS quarterbacks with at least 10,000 career passing yards
- List of NCAA Division I FBS quarterbacks with at least 80 career passing touchdowns
- List of NCAA major college football yearly passing leaders
