= Prosser, Washington =

City in Washington, United States

Prosser
- City
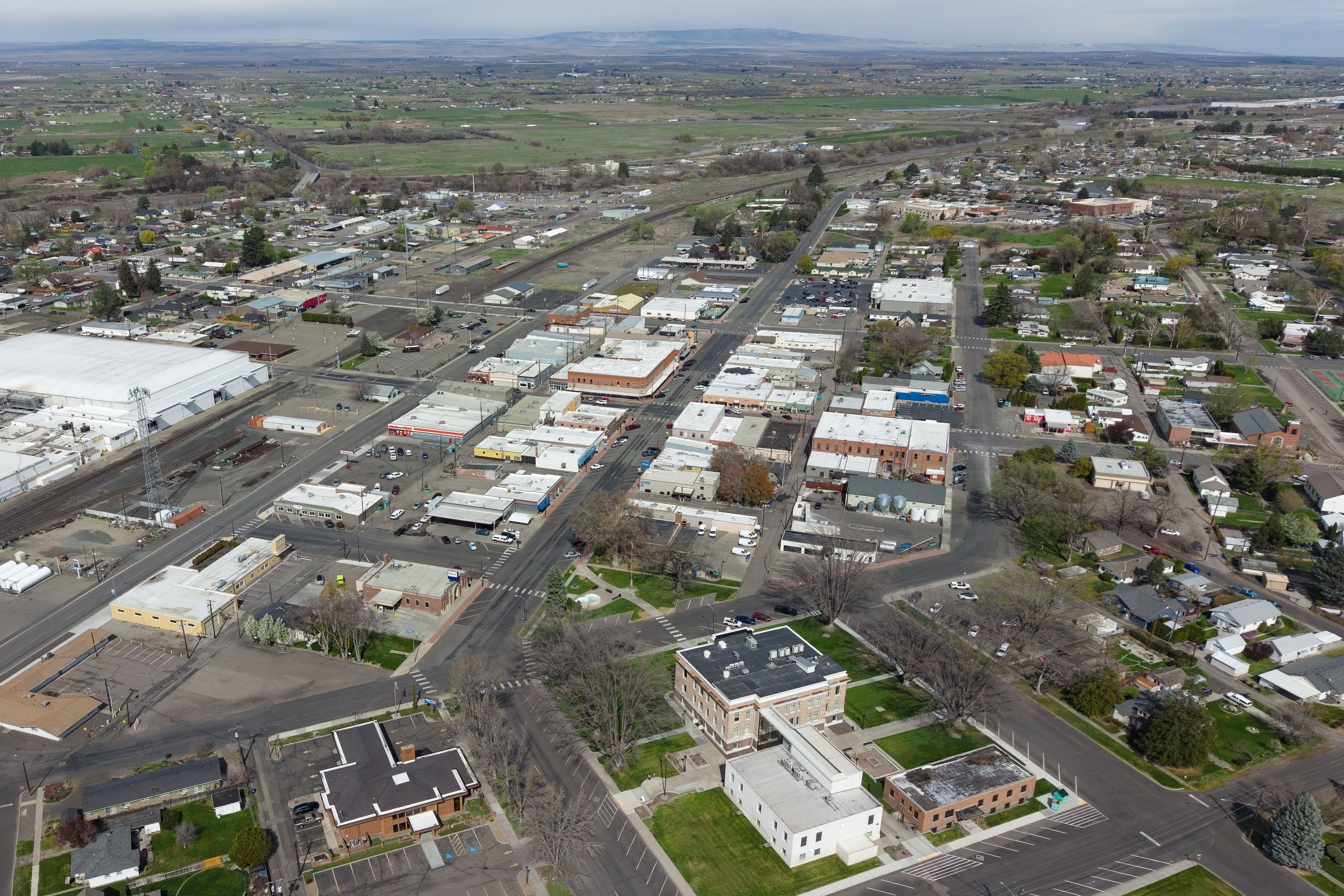
- Downtown (2026)

- Location of Prosser, Washington
- Coordinates: 46°12′42″N 119°45′10″W
- Country: United States
- State: Washington
- County: Benton
- Incorporated: 1899

Government
  - Type: Mayor–council
  - Mayor: Gary Vegar

Area
  - Total: 4.78 sq mi (12.39 km^{2})
  - Land: 4.66 sq mi (12.06 km^{2})
  - Water: 0.13 sq mi (0.33 km^{2})
- Elevation: 663 ft (202 m)

Population (2020)
  - Total: 6,062
  - Estimate (2022): 6,242
  - Density: 1,370.0/sq mi (528.96/km^{2})
- Time zone: UTC-8 (Pacific (PST))
  - Summer (DST): UTC-7 (PDT)
- ZIP code: 99350
- Area code: 509
- FIPS code: 53-56450
- GNIS feature ID: 2411497
- Website: cityofprosser.com

Prosser (/ˈprɑːsər/) is a city in and the county seat of Benton County, Washington, United States. Situated along the Yakima River, it had a population of 6,062 at the 2020 census.

== History ==
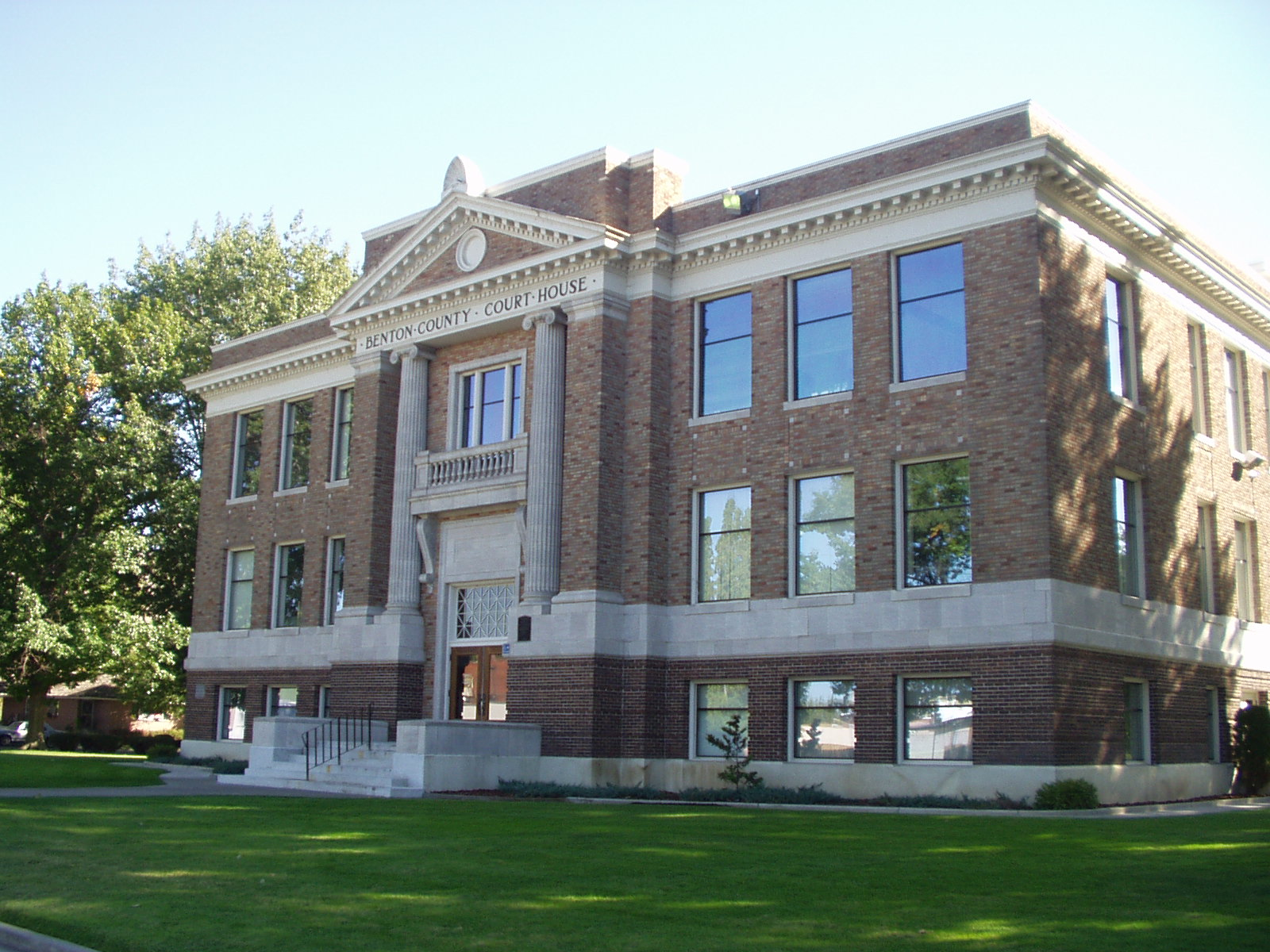
Benton County court house

Prosser was long home to Native Americans who lived and fished along the river. They called the area "Táptat" (alternatively spelled Tap-tat, Top tut, etc.), which translates to "long hair in front, short hair on the sides", referring to a style of headdress.

Colonel William Farrand Prosser first surveyed the area in 1879, then claimed homestead in 1882. The Northern Pacific Railroad laid tracks through the area two years later. A town plat was filed by Colonel Prosser in 1885, and in 1886 he was elected Yakima County Auditor. He moved to North Yakima to attend to these duties, and never returned to the town that he founded.

Lewis Hinzerling built a flour mill at Prosser falls in 1887, encouraging further settlement of the area. The first irrigation canal was completed in 1893 by the Prosser Falls Land and Irrigation Company. Prosser was officially incorporated in 1899 with a population of 229 people.

In 1905, Benton County was carved out of the eastern portions of Yakima and Klickitat Counties. The new town of Prosser was chosen as county seat. In 1907 a power plant was added and began delivering electricity to the town. The following year, a new high school was built, followed a year later by a telephone exchange. In 1910 the city received a grant from Andrew Carnegie for a public library.

Throughout the 1910s and 1920s various companies drilled in this area for oil and natural gas. There were no large findings and the Great Depression put an end to exploration.

On November 5, 1912, Benton County voters held a referendum to move the county seat from Prosser to either Kennewick or Benton City. Intense rivalry and war of words between Benton City, Kennewick, and Prosser preceded the vote. Despite getting a majority of the vote, Kennewick did not receive 60 percent of the vote as required by law. To date, Prosser remains the county seat.

In 1919, Washington State College (later WSU) established the Irrigation Experiment Station at Prosser. The program's mandate is to study the problems faced by farmers, orchardists, and ranchers in the dry central part of the state. The station originally employed scientists from the college in Pullman, who partnered with scientists from the Washington State Department of Agriculture (WSDA) and the United States Department of Agriculture (USDA). The station is still currently in use, and offers a number of agricultural education programs.

Prosser at one point had three newspapers, which were consolidated in the 1920s into the Prosser Record-Bulletin, and a permanent courthouse was built in 1926. The Benton County Historical Museum was dedicated in 1968.

In more recent years, Prosser's location on a major river (the Yakima) and highway access has encouraged a growing wine business and associated tourist industry. Several Prosser wineries are located within the Yakima Valley appellation.

== Geography ==
Prosser is located near the eastern end of the Yakima Valley. It is 665 feet (203 m) above sea level. One river, the Yakima River, runs through it.

According to the United States Census Bureau, the city has a total area of 4.53 square miles (11.73 km^{2}), of which, 4.49 square miles (11.63 km^{2}) is land and 0.04 square miles (0.10 km^{2}) is water. The former community of Kinneyville is now a neighborhood fully contained within Prosser. The city has the ZIP code 99350.

=== Climate ===
Prosser experiences a semi-arid climate (Köppen BSk).

Climate data for Prosser, Washington (1991–2020 normals, extremes 1925–present)
Month	Jan	Feb	Mar	Apr	May	Jun	Jul	Aug	Sep	Oct	Nov	Dec	Year
Record high °F (°C)	69 (21)	69 (21)	81 (27)	91 (33)	100 (38)	114 (46)	111 (44)	106 (41)	101 (38)	90 (32)	76 (24)	70 (21)	114 (46)
Mean daily maximum °F (°C)	40.1 (4.5)	46.7 (8.2)	55.9 (13.3)	64.6 (18.1)	74.1 (23.4)	80.9 (27.2)	90.4 (32.4)	89.2 (31.8)	79.7 (26.5)	64.7 (18.2)	49.3 (9.6)	39.5 (4.2)	64.6 (18.1)
Daily mean °F (°C)	33.5 (0.8)	37.6 (3.1)	45.4 (7.4)	52.2 (11.2)	61.0 (16.1)	67.2 (19.6)	75.0 (23.9)	73.4 (23.0)	64.9 (18.3)	52.8 (11.6)	40.5 (4.7)	32.9 (0.5)	53.0 (11.7)
Mean daily minimum °F (°C)	26.8 (−2.9)	28.6 (−1.9)	34.9 (1.6)	39.9 (4.4)	47.9 (8.8)	53.6 (12.0)	59.5 (15.3)	57.7 (14.3)	50.1 (10.1)	40.8 (4.9)	31.7 (−0.2)	26.3 (−3.2)	41.5 (5.3)
Record low °F (°C)	−20 (−29)	−20 (−29)	6 (−14)	14 (−10)	26 (−3)	30 (−1)	31 (−1)	36 (2)	21 (−6)	11 (−12)	−7 (−22)	−11 (−24)	−20 (−29)
Average precipitation inches (mm)	1.24 (31)	0.90 (23)	0.69 (18)	0.74 (19)	0.88 (22)	0.68 (17)	0.21 (5.3)	0.16 (4.1)	0.27 (6.9)	0.77 (20)	0.86 (22)	1.33 (34)	8.73 (222)
Average precipitation days (≥ 0.01 in)	8.3	5.9	5.9	5.2	5.8	3.7	1.7	1.5	2.7	5.7	7.1	8.3	61.8
Source: NOAA

== Demographics ==
Historical population
Census	Pop.	Note	%±
1900	229		—
1910	1,298		466.8%
1920	1,697		30.7%
1930	1,569		−7.5%
1940	1,719		9.6%
1950	2,636		53.3%
1960	2,763		4.8%
1970	2,954		6.9%
1980	3,896		31.9%
1990	4,476		14.9%
2000	4,838		8.1%
2010	5,714		18.1%
2020	6,062		6.1%
2022 (est.)	6,242		3.0%
U.S. Decennial Census; 2020 Census

=== 2020 census ===
As of the 2020 census, Prosser had a population of 6,062. The median age was 35.2 years, 27.8% of residents were under the age of 18, and 16.7% were 65 years of age or older. For every 100 females there were 92.3 males, and for every 100 females age 18 and over there were 87.7 males age 18 and over.

96.9% of residents lived in urban areas, while 3.1% lived in rural areas.

There were 2,164 households in Prosser, of which 39.0% had children under the age of 18 living in them. Of all households, 46.0% were married-couple households, 15.4% were households with a male householder and no spouse or partner present, and 31.4% were households with a female householder and no spouse or partner present. About 25.6% of all households were made up of individuals and 12.9% had someone living alone who was 65 years of age or older.

There were 2,346 housing units, of which 7.8% were vacant. The homeowner vacancy rate was 1.5% and the rental vacancy rate was 7.1%.

Racial composition as of the 2020 census
Race	Number	Percent
White	3,368	55.6%
Black or African American	36	0.6%
American Indian and Alaska Native	57	0.9%
Asian	140	2.3%
Native Hawaiian and Other Pacific Islander	11	0.2%
Some other race	1,543	25.5%
Two or more races	907	15.0%
Hispanic or Latino (of any race)	2,788	46.0%

=== 2010 census ===
As of the 2010 census, there were 5,714 people, 2,023 households, and 1,396 families residing in the city. The population density was 1,272.6 inhabitants per square mile (491.4/km^{2}). There were 2,129 housing units at an average density of 474.2 per square mile (183.1/km^{2}). The racial makeup of the city was 76.1% White, 0.5% African American, 0.5% Native American, 2.0% Asian, 0.1% Pacific Islander, 17.6% from other races, and 3.2% from two or more races. Hispanic or Latino of any race were 37.2% of the population.

There were 2,023 households, of which 39.8% had children under the age of 18 living with them, 49.3% were married couples living together, 14.2% had a female householder with no husband present, 5.4% had a male householder with no wife present, and 31.0% were non-families. 27.3% of all households were made up of individuals, and 13.8% had someone living alone who was 65 years of age or older. The average household size was 2.80 and the average family size was 3.42.

The median age in the city was 32.8 years. 30.8% of residents were under the age of 18; 8.8% were between the ages of 18 and 24; 25.5% were from 25 to 44; 21.4% were from 45 to 64; and 13.5% were 65 years of age or older. The gender makeup of the city was 47.7% male and 52.3% female.

=== 2000 census ===
As of the 2000 census, there were 4,838 people 1,697 households, and 1,240 families residing in the city. The population density was 1,125.1 people per square mile (434.4/km^{2}). There were 1,800 housing units at an average density of 418.6 per square mile (161.6/km^{2}). The racial makeup of the city was 79.89% White, 0.54% African American, 0.91% Native American, 0.76% Asian, 0.29% Pacific Islander, 15.11% from other races, and 2.50% from two or more races. Hispanic or Latino of any race were 29.37% of the population. Ancestries: German (17.3%), English (10.8%), Irish (9.3%), United States (6.8%), Norwegian (4.3%), French (4.2%), 12.5% Foreign born (99.1% Mexican).

There were 1,697 households, out of which 41.5% had children under the age of 18 living with them, 57.2% were married couples living together, 12.2% had a female householder with no husband present, and 26.9% were non-families. 24.0% of all households were made up of individuals, and 10.9% had someone living alone who was 65 years of age or older. The average household size was 2.83 and the average family size was 3.38.

In the city, the age distribution of the population showed 32.5% under the age of 18, 9.6% from 18 to 24, 26.0% from 25 to 44, 19.5% from 45 to 64, and 12.3% who were 65 years of age or older. The median age was 32 years. For every 100 females, there were 91.4 males. For every 100 females age 18 and over, there were 88.8 males.

The median income for a household in the city was $39,185, and the median income for a family was $45,162. Males had a median income of $36,750 versus $26,146 for females. The per capita income for the city was $16,302. About 11.5% of families and 13.5% of the population were below the poverty line, including 21.1% of those under age 18 and 2.6% of those age 65 or over.

== Economy ==
The economy of Prosser is based on agriculture. In addition to fruit orchards and fruit packing plants, Prosser is part of the Yakima Valley AVA, a major wine-growing region. Prosser now has nearly 30 wineries in the city and surrounding areas.

== Schools ==
Public education is provided by the Prosser School District, also known as Prosser Public Schools, which operates six schools.

Prosser High School	Grades 9–12	868 students
Prosser Opportunity Academy	Grades 9–12	25 students
Housel Middle School	Grades 6–8	571 students
Keene-Riverview Elementary	Grades K-2	394 students
Prosser Heights Elementary	Grades 3–5	359 students
Whitstran Elementary	Grades K-5	226 students
Total six schools	Grades K-12	Total 2,443 Student Enrolled 2022-23 School Year

== Media ==
Prosser was formerly served by four competing newspapers at the turn of the 20th century. The American was established in 1893 and only ran for three years and was bought out by the new Prosser Record. The Prosser Falls Bulletin ceased publication in 1902 and was replaced with the Republican Bulletin in 1907. The Benton Independent was established in 1909 and was consolidated into the Record in 1913, becoming the Independent Record five years later. On July 1, 1920, the Republican Bulletin and Independent Record were merged into the Prosser Record-Bulletin, which continues to serve the Prosser area.

In addition to a newspaper, Prosser has had an FM-radio station since 1963. KZXR-FM (101.7 FM) is a radio station broadcasting a regional Mexican music format. The station is currently owned by Amador and Rosalie Bustos' Bustos Media, through licensee Bustos Media Holdings, LLC.

== Crime ==
Prosser
- Crime rates* (2022)

Violent crimes
- Homicide: 0
- Rape: 0
- Robbery: 1
- Aggravated assault: 6
- Total violent crime: 7

Property crimes
- Burglary: 13
- Larceny-theft: 102
- Motor vehicle theft: 31
- Arson: 1
- Total property crime: 147
- Note: Reported crimes per 100,000 population Source: 2022 FBI UCR Data

== Notable people ==
- Mary L. Boas — Mathematician and physics instructor and author
- George Boomer — Socialist newspaper editor and 1908 gubernatorial candidate
- Walter Clore — Father of Washington wine
- Lorena González, Seattle city councilmember
- Kelly Blair Labounty — 1996 Olympian.
- Harold McCluskey — "The Atomic Man"
- Kellen Moore — Former NFL Quarterback. Current Head Coach of the New Orleans Saints.
- Kirby Moore — Former wide receiver. Current head football coach at Washington State University.
- Brian Norman Prior — IX Bishop of the Episcopal Church in Minnesota
- William Farrand Prosser — city founder, U.S. Army Colonel in the Civil War

== See also ==
- List of Harvest Festivals
