= Kinneyville, Washington =

Unincorporated community in Washington, United States

- neighborhood
- Location within Benton County, Washington
- Coordinates: 46°12′27″N 119°47′32″W
- Country: United States
- State: Washington
- County: Benton
- Elevation: 679 ft (207 m)
- Time zone: UTC-8 (Pacific (PST))
  - Summer (DST): UTC-7 (PDT)
- ZIP code: 99350
- Area code: 509
- GNIS feature ID: 1514763

Kinneyville was an unincorporated community in Benton County, Washington, United States, and is now a part of Prosser.

== History ==
The community was founded by in the early 1880s by James Gordon Kinney, a stage station master. At that time, Prosser was called Prosser Falls. By 1883, Kinneyville had two restaurants, several saloons, a hotel and a single residence. The community was called Kinneyville before merging with Prosser Falls to form Prosser.

== See also ==
- Horse Heaven, Washington
