= Lucien Boldewijn =

Dutch basketball player (born 1971)

Lucien Boldewijn (born November 3, 1971, in Paramaribo, Suriname) is a Dutch basketball player who played for Dutch league eredivisie club Rotterdam Challengers during the 2003–2006 seasons.
