= Kirby Moore =

American football player and coach (born 1990)

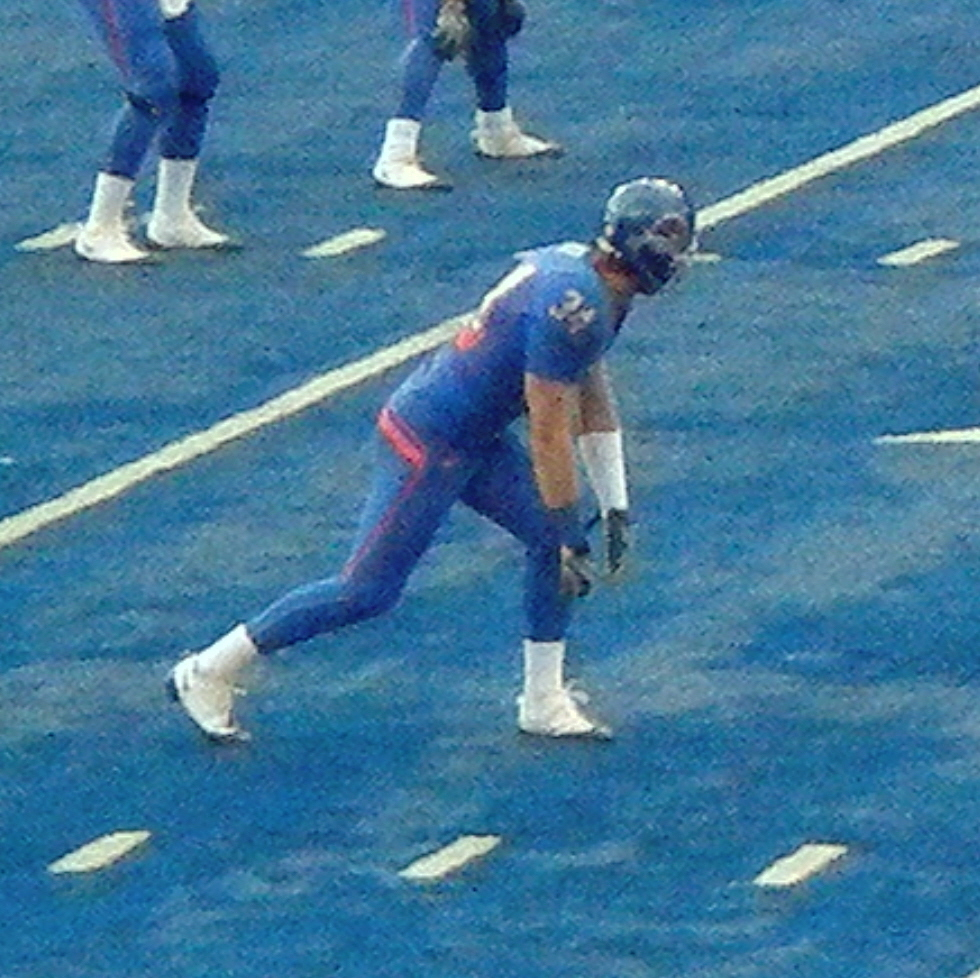
- Moore in 2009

Current position
- Title: Head coach
- Team: Washington State
- Conference: Pac-12
- Record: 2–9

Biographical details
- Born: August 23, 1990 (age 36)

Playing career
- 2009–2013: Boise State
- Position: Wide receiver

Coaching career (HC unless noted)
- 2014: College of Idaho (WR)
- 2015–2016: Washington (GA)
- 2017–2019: Fresno State (WR)
- 2020–2021: Fresno State (PGC/WR)
- 2022: Fresno State (OC/QB)
- 2023–2024: Missouri (OC/QB)
- 2025: Missouri (OC)
- 2026–present: Washington State

Head coaching record
- Overall: 2–9

Kirby Moore (born August 23, 1990) is an American college football coach, currently the head coach at Washington State University. He previously served as the offensive coordinator and quarterbacks coach at the University of Missouri from 2023 to 2025. Moore previously served as an assistant coach at California State University, Fresno (Fresno State), the University of Washington, and College of Idaho. He played college football at Boise State University as a wide receiver from 2009 to 2013.

== Early life and playing career ==
Moore grew up in Prosser, Washington, and attended Prosser High School. He was a four-year starter for the football team, which was coached by his father. Moore was named the Washington 2A Player of the Year as a senior after catching 131 passes for 2,126 yards and 34 touchdowns. He finished his high school career with 304 receptions for 4,909 yards and national high school record 95 touchdowns.

Moore followed his older brother Kellen and played college football at Boise State for five seasons. He caught 21 passes for 242 yards and two touchdowns as a freshman. Moore redshirted his true sophomore season. He had 22 receptions for 247 yards with one touchdown as a redshirt sophomore. Moore was the Broncos' second-leading receiver during his redshirt junior season 36 receptions and 368 receiving yards. He missed half of his redshirt senior season to a foot injury. Moore finished his college playing career with 115 receptions for 1,137 and six touchdowns in 45 games played.

== Coaching career ==
=== Early career ===
Moore began his coaching career as a wide receivers coach at the College of Idaho when the school revived its football program in 2014.

=== Washington ===
In 2015, Moore was hired as an offensive graduate assistant at Washington, reuniting him with former Boise State head coach Chris Petersen.

=== Fresno State ===
Moore was hired as the wide receivers coach at Fresno State in 2017. He remained on staff after head coach Jeff Tedford resigned and was named passing game coordinator in addition to wide receivers coach by new head coach Kalen DeBoer. Moore was promoted offensive coordinator in December 2021 after DeBoer left Fresno State to become the head coach at Washington and Tedford was re-hired.

=== Missouri ===
On January 4, 2023, Moore was hired as offensive coordinator for the University of Missouri, serving under head coach Eliah Drinkwitz. On December 31, 2023, the University of Missouri announced a contract extension for Moore through the 2025 football season which included a pay raise to $1.5 million for the 2024 season.

=== Washington State ===
On December 12, 2025, Moore was named as the 36th head coach at Washington State.

== Head coaching record ==
Year	Team	Overall	Conference	Standing	Bowl/playoffs
Washington State Cougars (Pac-12 Conference) (2026–present)
2026	Washington State	2–9	1–6		
Washington State:		2–9	1–6		
Total:		2–9			

== Personal life ==
Moore is married to his wife, Kayla, and they have three children. Moore's father, Tom, was a high school football coach at Prosser High School in Prosser, Washington. His brother Kellen is the head coach of the New Orleans Saints.
