= Geraldo Boldewijn =

American gridiron football player (born 1991)

No. 18
- Position: Wide receiver

Personal information
- Born: February 14, 1991 (age 35); Amsterdam, Netherlands
- Listed height: 6 ft 4 in (1.93 m)
- Listed weight: 218 lb (99 kg)

Career information
- High school: Boise (ID) Capital
- College: Boise State

Career history
- 2014: Atlanta Falcons*
- 2015–2016: BC Lions
- * Offseason or practice squad member only
- Stats at CFL.ca

Geraldo Boldewijn (born Geraldo Hiwat; February 14, 1991) is a Dutch former gridiron football wide receiver. He played college football at Boise State University. He was a member of the Atlanta Falcons of the National Football League (NFL) and the BC Lions of the Canadian Football League (CFL).

== Early life ==
Boldewijn was born in Amsterdam and later began playing football for the Amsterdam Panthers of the American Football Bond Nederland (AFBN). He started playing flag football in the Netherlands and did not play tackle football until he was fifteen.

He moved to Boise, Idaho to play one year of high school football at Capital High School, earning first-team All-Southern Idaho Conference and second-team all-state honors his senior year as the team finished with an 8–2 record. Boldewijn played in the East-West Shrine Game as well. He recorded 41 receptions for 502 yards and five touchdowns his senior season. He also rushed for 51 yards and one touchdown on three carries, returned eight kickoffs for 303 yards and a touchdown and returned six punts for 107 yards and a touchdown.

== College career ==
Boldewijn played for the Boise State Broncos from 2010 to 2013. He was redshirted in 2009. He played in thirteen games in 2010, catching 11 passes for 160 yards. Boldewijn changed his name from "Geraldo Hiwat" to "Geraldo Boldewijn" after his redshirt freshman year. "Boldewijn" is his mother's last name. He was suspended for the first four games of the 2011 season by the NCAA for receiving improper benefits, which was borrowing a 1990 Toyota Camry with 177,000 miles on it. He played in, and started three, of the team's last nine games of the 2011 season, recording 19 receptions for 266 yards and two touchdowns. The NCAA suspended Boldewijn for the first four games of the 2012 season for receiving extra benefits, which resulted from his high school host family assisting him in booking a flight to the Netherlands to see his family over Christmas. He appeared in, and started four, of the Broncos' last nine games in 2012, catching 18 passes for 197 yards and two touchdowns. He started all thirteen games his redshirt senior season in 2013, catching 39 passes for 528 yards and two touchdowns. Boldewijn majored in business at Boise State.

== Professional career ==
Pre-draft measurables
Height	Weight	40-yard dash	10-yard split	20-yard split	20-yard shuttle	Three-cone drill	Vertical jump	Broad jump	Bench press
6 ft 3 in (1.91 m)	215 lb (98 kg)	4.56 s	1.58 s	2.62 s	4.19 s	6.88 s	34 in (0.86 m)	10 ft 7 in (3.23 m)	18 reps
All values from Boise State Pro Day

Boldewijn had workouts with the New England Patriots and Arizona Cardinals of the NFL in April 2014. He later had a workout with the Miami Dolphins in April 2015.

Boldewijn signed with the NFL's Atlanta Falcons in May 2014 after going undrafted in the 2014 NFL draft. He injured his right hamstring during practice on August 26. On August 30, 2014, he was given an injury settlement and released by the team. Boldewijn's attempt to make the Falcons' final roster was chronicled on Hard Knocks.

On September 22, 2015, he was signed to the practice roster of the BC Lions of the CFL. He made his CFL debut and first start in the team's last game of the regular season, recording three receptions for 64 yards in a 28–7 loss to the Calgary Stampeders. One of Boldewijn's three catches went for fifty yards. He was released by the Lions on November 14, 2015. He signed with the Lions on February 2, 2016.

== Personal life ==
Boldewijn's family's roots are in Suriname.
